= Nebraska Cornhuskers men's basketball statistical leaders =

This list of Nebraska Cornhuskers men's basketball statistical leaders shows the individual statistical leaders of the Nebraska Cornhuskers men's basketball program in various categories. The Cornhuskers compete in NCAA Division I, representing the University of Nebraska–Lincoln in the Big Ten Conference.

The NCAA did not officially record assists until 1983–84, and blocks and steals until 1985–86, and these statistics are often unavailable on a game-by-game basis until later.

== Points ==
Career
| Rank | Player | Points | Seasons |
|---|---|---|---|
| 1 | Dave Hoppen | 2,167 | 1982–1986 |
| 2 | Eric Piatkowski | 1,934 | 1990–1994 |
| 3 | Jerry Fort | 1,882 | 1972–1976 |
| 4 | Andre Smith | 1,717 | 1977–1981 |
| 5 | Aleks Marić | 1,630 | 2004–2008 |
| 5 | Shavon Shields | 1,630 | 2012–2016 |
| 7 | Jaron Boone | 1,609 | 1992–1996 |
| 8 | Erick Strickland | 1,586 | 1992–1996 |
| 9 | Tyronn Lue | 1,577 | 1995–1998 |
| 10 | Cookie Belcher | 1,552 | 1996–2001 |

Season
| Rank | Player | Points | Season |
|---|---|---|---|
| 1 | Brice Williams | 713 | 2024–25 |
| 2 | James Palmer Jr. | 708 | 2018–19 |
| 3 | Dave Hoppen | 704 | 1984–85 |
| 4 | Tyronn Lue | 678 | 1997–98 |
| 6 | Eric Piatkowski | 646 | 1993–94 |
| 7 | Pryce Sandfort | 634 | 2025–26 |
| 8 | Tyronn Lue | 603 | 1996–97 |
| 9 | Andre Smith | 600 | 1979–80 |
| 10 | Dave Hoppen | 598 | 1983–84 |

Single game
| Rank | Player | Points | Date | Opponent |
|---|---|---|---|---|
| 1 | Brice Williams | 43 | March 4, 2025 | Ohio State |
| 2 | Eric Piatkowski | 42 | March 11, 1994 | Oklahoma |
| 3 | Aleks Marić | 41 | February 13, 2007 | Kansas State |
| 3 | Teddy Allen | 41 | February 23, 2021 | Penn State |
| 5 | Jerry Fort | 40 | February 22, 1975 | Missouri |
| 5 | Rich King | 40 | February 18, 1991 | Northern Illinois |
| 7 | Tom Russell | 38 | February 21, 1962 | Kansas |
| 8 | Aleks Marić | 37 | February 15, 2006 | Iowa State |
| 9 | Four tied | 36 | | |

== Rebounds ==
Career
| Rank | Player | Rebounds | Seasons |
|---|---|---|---|
| 1 | Venson Hamilton | 1,080 | 1995–1999 |
| 2 | Aleks Marić | 1,015 | 2004–2008 |
| 3 | Leroy Chalk | 782 | 1968–1971 |
| 4 | Dave Hoppen | 773 | 1982–1986 |
| 5 | Rich King | 761 | 1987–1991 |
| 6 | Andre Smith | 753 | 1977–1981 |
| 7 | Chuck Jura | 740 | 1969–1972 |
| 8 | Carl McPipe | 723 | 1975–1979 |
| 9 | John Turek | 682 | 2001–2005 |
| 10 | Rex Ekwall | 679 | 1954–1957 |

Season
| Rank | Player | Rebounds | Season |
|---|---|---|---|
| 1 | Venson Hamilton | 335 | 1998–99 |
| 1 | Aleks Marić | 335 | 2007–08 |
| 3 | Venson Hamilton | 315 | 1997–98 |
| 4 | Chuck Jura | 305 | 1971–72 |
| 5 | Leroy Chalk | 290 | 1970–71 |
| 6 | Rich King | 274 | 1990–91 |
| 7 | Venson Hamilton | 269 | 1996–97 |
| 8 | Kimani Ffriend | 263 | 1999–00 |
| 9 | Aleks Marić | 260 | 2006–07 |
| 10 | Dave Hoppen | 258 | 1984–85 |

Single game (since 2006–07) (Note: Available on a game-by-game basis from 2006–07. Nebraska's single-game record holder is Bill Johnson, who had twenty-six rebounds against Iowa State on January 4, 1954.)
| Rank | Player | Rebounds | Date | Opponent |
|---|---|---|---|---|
| 1 | Aleks Marić | 19 | February 24, 2007 | Missouri |
| 1 | Yvan Ouedraogo | 19 | March 1, 2020 | Northwestern |
| 3 | Ed Morrow | 18 | December 18, 2016 | Gardner–Webb |
| 3 | Tanner Borchardt | 18 | February 2, 2019 | Maryland |
| 3 | Juwan Gary | 18 | December 17, 2023 | Kansas State |
| 6 | Aleks Marić | 17 | January 11, 2006 | Kansas State |
| 6 | Aleks Marić | 17 | February 20, 2008 | Kansas State |
| 8 | Seven tied | 16 | | |

== Assists ==
Career
| Rank | Player | Assists | Seasons |
|---|---|---|---|
| 1 | Brian Carr | 682 | 1983–1987 |
| 2 | Cookie Belcher | 477 | 1996–2001 |
| 3 | Jaron Boone | 446 | 1992–1996 |
| 4 | Tyronn Lue | 432 | 1995–1998 |
| 5 | Erick Strickland | 414 | 1992–1996 |
| 6 | Charles Richardson | 399 | 2003–2007 |
| 7 | Jack Moore | 382 | 1978–1982 |
| 7 | Glynn Watson Jr. | 382 | 2015–2019 |
| 9 | Jamar Johnson | 355 | 1991–1994 |
| 10 | Clifford Scales | 354 | 1987–1991 |

Season
| Rank | Player | Assists | Season |
|---|---|---|---|
| 1 | Brian Carr | 237 | 1984–85 |
| 2 | Brian Carr | 201 | 1985–86 |
| 3 | Charles Richardson | 179 | 2006–07 |
| 3 | Cam Mack | 179 | 2019–20 |
| 5 | Alonzo Verge Jr. | 169 | 2021–22 |
| 6 | Brian Carr | 166 | 1986–87 |
| 7 | Sam Hoiberg | 157 | 2025–26 |
| 8 | Tyronn Lue | 152 | 1997–98 |
| 9 | Jack Moore | 145 | 1979–80 |
| 9 | Lance Jeter | 145 | 2010–11 |

Single game (since 2006–07) (Note: Available on a game-by-game basis from 2006–07. Nebraska's single-game record holder is Brian Carr, who had eighteen assists against Evansville on January 3, 1985.)
| Rank | Player | Assists | Season | Opponent |
|---|---|---|---|---|
| 1 | Charles Richardson | 15 | December 2, 2006 | Rutgers |
| 3 | Lance Jeter | 12 | February 17, 2010 | Kansas State |
| 3 | Cam Mack | 12 | December 15, 2019 | Purdue |
| 3 | Alonzo Verge | 12 | December 22, 2021 | Kennesaw State |
| 5 | Sek Henry | 11 | November 21, 2009 | TCU |
| 5 | Cam Mack | 11 | November 9, 2019 | Southern Utah |
| 5 | Alonzo Verge | 11 | December 1, 2021 | North Carolina State |
| 5 | Alonzo Verge | 11 | March 1, 2022 | Ohio State |
| 9 | Eleven tied | 10 | Most recent: Sam Hoiberg, February 21, 2026 vs. Penn State | |

== Steals ==
Career
| Rank | Player | Steals | Seasons |
|---|---|---|---|
| 1 | Cookie Belcher | 353 | 1996–2001 |
| 2 | Erick Strickland | 257 | 1992–1996 |
| 3 | Venson Hamilton | 186 | 1995–1999 |
| 4 | Clifford Scales | 177 | 1987–1991 |
| 4 | Glynn Watson Jr. | 177 | 2015–2019 |
| 6 | Ryan Anderson | 166 | 2006–2010 |
| 7 | Sam Hoiberg | 162 | 2022–2026 |
| 7 | Brian Carr | 159 | 1983–1987 |
| 8 | Tyronn Lue | 154 | 1995–1998 |
| 9 | Brandon Richardson | 145 | 2008–2012 |
| 10 | Two tied | 137 | 2012–2016 |

Season
| Rank | Player | Steals | Season |
|---|---|---|---|
| 1 | Cookie Belcher | 102 | 1998–99 |
| 2 | Erick Strickland | 89 | 1994–95 |
| 3 | Cookie Belcher | 87 | 1996–97 |
| 4 | Cookie Belcher | 82 | 2000–01 |
| 5 | Cookie Belcher | 75 | 1997–98 |
| 6 | Sam Hoiberg | 70 | 2025–26 |
| 7 | Eric Johnson | 68 | 1988–89 |
| 7 | Venson Hamilton | 67 | 1998–99 |
| 7 | Brian Carr | 67 | 1986–87 |
| 10 | Clifford Scales | 64 | 1990–91 |

Single game
| Rank | Player | Steals | Season | Opponent |
|---|---|---|---|---|
| 1 | Greg Downing | 8 | 1982–83 | UMKC |
| 1 | Cookie Belcher | 8 | 1998–99 | Texas Tech |
| 1 | Venson Hamilton | 8 | 1998–99 | Texas Tech |
| 1 | Cookie Belcher | 8 | 2000–01 | Oklahoma State |

== Blocks ==
Career
| Rank | Player | Blocks | Seasons |
|---|---|---|---|
| 1 | Venson Hamilton | 241 | 1995–1999 |
| 2 | Mikki Moore | 236 | 1993–1997 |
| 3 | Rich King | 183 | 1987–1991 |
| 4 | John Turek | 163 | 2001–2005 |
| 5 | Kimani Ffriend | 159 | 1999–2001 |
| 6 | Isaiah Roby | 154 | 2016–2019 |
| 7 | Aleks Marić | 145 | 2004–2008 |
| 8 | Derrick Chandler | 144 | 1991–1993 |
| 9 | Wes Wilkinson | 113 | 2002–2006 |
| 10 | Jorge Brian Diaz | 110 | 2009–2012 |

Season
| Rank | Player | Blocks | Season |
|---|---|---|---|
| 1 | Derrick Chandler | 91 | 1991–92 |
| 2 | Mikki Moore | 88 | 1996–97 |
| 3 | Kimani Ffriend | 85 | 1999–00 |
| 4 | Venson Hamilton | 80 | 1998–99 |
| 5 | Kimani Ffriend | 74 | 2000–01 |
| 6 | Mikki Moore | 71 | 1995–96 |
| 7 | Rich King | 68 | 1990–91 |
| 8 | Mikki Moore | 67 | 1994–95 |
| 9 | Isaiah Roby | 66 | 2017–18 |
| 9 | Venson Hamilton | 66 | 1997–98 |

Single game
| Rank | Player | Blocks | Season | Opponent |
|---|---|---|---|---|
| 1 | Mikki Moore | 9 | 1996–97 | Coppin State |
