= All-Big 12 Conference =

All-Big 12 Conference may refer to:

- List of All-Big 12 Conference football teams
- List of All-Big 12 Conference men's basketball teams

== See also ==
- Big 12 Conference
