= Fred Hoiberg =

American basketball player and coach (born 1972)

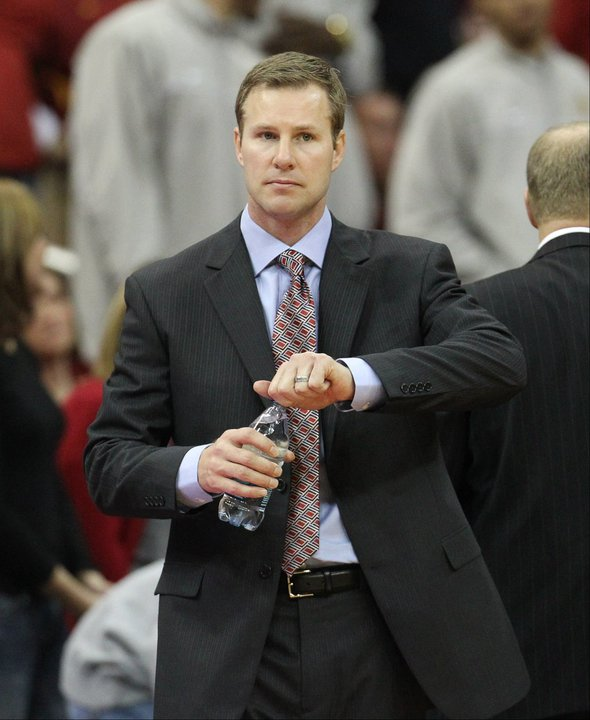
- Hoiberg in 2010 during his tenure as head coach at Iowa State

Nebraska Cornhuskers
- Title: Head coach
- League: Big Ten Conference

Personal information
- Born: October 15, 1972 (age 54) Lincoln, Nebraska, U.S.
- Listed height: 6 ft 5 in (1.96 m)
- Listed weight: 210 lb (95 kg)

Career information
- High school: Ames (Ames, Iowa)
- College: Iowa State (1991–1995)
- NBA draft: 1995: 2nd round, 52nd overall pick
- Drafted by: Indiana Pacers
- Playing career: 1995–2005
- Position: Shooting guard
- Number: 20, 32
- Coaching career: 2010–present

Career history

Playing
- 1995–1999: Indiana Pacers
- 1999–2003: Chicago Bulls
- 2003–2005: Minnesota Timberwolves

Coaching
- 2010–2015: Iowa State
- 2015–2018: Chicago Bulls
- 2019–present: Nebraska

Career highlights
- As player: First-team All-Big Eight (1995); Second-team All-Big Eight (1994); No. 32 retired by Iowa State Cyclones; Iowa Mr. Basketball (1991); As coach: AP Coach of the Year (2026); Jim Phelan Coach of the Year (2024); 2× Big 12 tournament champion (2014, 2015); College Basketball Crown (2025); Big 12 Coach of the Year (2012); 2× Big Ten Coach of the Year (2024, 2026)
- Stats at NBA.com
- Stats at Basketball Reference

Fredrick Kristian Hoiberg (born October 15, 1972) is an American college basketball coach and former player. He has served as the men's head basketball coach at the University of Nebraska since 2019. Hoiberg grew up in Ames, Iowa, and played college basketball at Iowa State University in Ames where he earned the nickname "the Mayor". He was drafted into the National Basketball Association (NBA) where, over his 10-year career, he played for the Indiana Pacers, Chicago Bulls, and Minnesota Timberwolves. After retiring as a player, he served as vice president for basketball operations for the Minnesota Timberwolves before beginning his coaching career at his alma mater, Iowa State University. He was there from 2010 to 2015 before coaching in the NBA for the Chicago Bulls from 2015 to 2018.

== Playing career ==
=== High school and college career ===
Hoiberg, a multi-talented athlete, was the quarterback of the football team and the captain of the basketball team at Ames High School in Ames, Iowa. He led his basketball team to a state championship in 1991, and was honored as the State of Iowa's "Mr. Basketball" that year. He chose to play basketball for his hometown Iowa State Cyclones, then of the Big Eight Conference, over many other offers. He played three seasons for coach Johnny Orr and one season for Tim Floyd. Hoiberg was a First-Team All-Big Eight selection in 1995.

Arguably the most popular player in the history of Iowa State basketball, Hoiberg is among the top seven positions for nearly every statistical category, and his number 32 has been retired by Iowa State. In college, he was known as an all-around player, capable of making clutch shots in important situations. While at Iowa State, Hoiberg joined Pi Kappa Alpha fraternity.

Hoiberg obtained the nickname "The Mayor" after receiving several write-in votes during the 1993 Ames, Iowa mayoral race.

The National Federation of State High School Associations announced in 2012 that Hoiberg was elected to the National High School Hall of Fame.

=== Professional career ===
At 6 ft 4 in. (193 cm) and 210 lbs. (95 kg), Hoiberg played shooting guard. He was selected 52nd overall by the Indiana Pacers in the 1995 NBA draft. In 1999, after four years with the Pacers, he signed as a free agent with the Chicago Bulls, at that time coached by Floyd, where he remained for four years. On July 28, 2003, Hoiberg signed as a free agent to play for the Timberwolves, where he received greater acclaim as a three-point specialist.

In 2005, Hoiberg became the first player in NBA history to lead the league in three-point shooting percentage and not be invited to the three-point shooting competition in that season's All-Star event.

=== Retirement ===
Hoiberg underwent surgery in June 2005 to correct an enlarged aortic root (aneurysm of sinus of Valsalva). The operation was successful, but after a brief comeback attempt as a player, on April 17, 2006, Hoiberg announced his retirement from basketball to take a job in the Timberwolves front office.

== Career statistics ==
Legend
GP	Games played	GS	Games started	MPG	Minutes per game
FG%	Field goal percentage	3P%	3-point field goal percentage	FT%	Free throw percentage
RPG	Rebounds per game	APG	Assists per game	SPG	Steals per game
BPG	Blocks per game	PPG	Points per game	**Bold**	Career high

*	Led the league

=== NBA ===
==== Regular season ====
Year	Team	GP	GS	MPG	FG%	3P%	FT%	RPG	APG	SPG	BPG	PPG
1995–96	Indiana	15	1	5.7	.421	.333	.833	.6	.5	.4	.1	2.1
1996–97	Indiana	47	0	12.2	.429	.414	.792	1.7	.9	.6	.1	4.8
1997–98	Indiana	65	1	13.4	.383	.376	.855	1.9	.7	.6	.0	4.0
1998–99	Indiana	12	0	7.3	.286	.111	**1.000**	.9	.3	.0	.0	1.6
1999–2000	Chicago	31	11	27.3	.387	.340	.908	3.5	2.7	**1.3**	.1	9.0
2000–01	Chicago	74	**37**	**30.4**	.438	.412	.866	**4.2**	**3.6**	**1.3**	**.2**	**9.1**
2001–02	Chicago	**79**	8	17.8	.416	.261	.840	2.7	1.7	.8	.1	4.4
2002–03	Chicago	63	0	12.4	.389	.238	.820	2.2	1.1	.6	.1	2.3
2003–04	Minnesota	**79**	3	22.8	.465	.442	.845	3.4	1.4	.8	.1	6.7
2004–05	Minnesota	76	0	16.7	**.489**	**.483***	.873	2.4	1.1	.7	**.2**	5.8
Career		541	61	18.4	.431	.396	.854	2.7	1.6	.8	.1	5.4

==== Playoffs ====
Year	Team	GP	GS	MPG	FG%	3P%	FT%	RPG	APG	SPG	BPG	PPG
1998	Indiana	2	0	10.0	.375	**.500**	**1.000**	2.0	.5	.5	.0	4.5
1999	Indiana	4	0	5.0	**.500**	—	—	.8	.5	.8	.0	1.0
2004	Minnesota	**18**	0	**24.3**	.453	.458	.938	**3.7**	**1.3**	**.9**	.0	**6.4**
Career		24	0	19.9	.449	.460	.944	3.0	1.1	.8	.0	5.3

=== College ===
Year	Team	GP	GS	MPG	FG%	3P%	FT%	RPG	APG	SPG	BPG	PPG
1991–92	Iowa State	**34**	32	30.5	**.573**	.260	.806	5.3	2.5	**1.9**	**.2**	12.1
1992–93	Iowa State	31	31	32.8	.550	.367	.816	6.3	3.0	1.8	.0	11.6
1993–94	Iowa State	27	26	36.0	.535	**.450**	**.864**	**6.7**	**3.6**	1.7	.1	**20.2**
1994–95	Iowa State	**34**	**34**	**36.8**	.438	.412	.861	5.6	2.2	1.1	.1	19.9
Career		126	123	34.0	.511	.400	.844	5.9	2.8	1.6	.1	15.8

== Coaching career ==
=== Iowa State ===
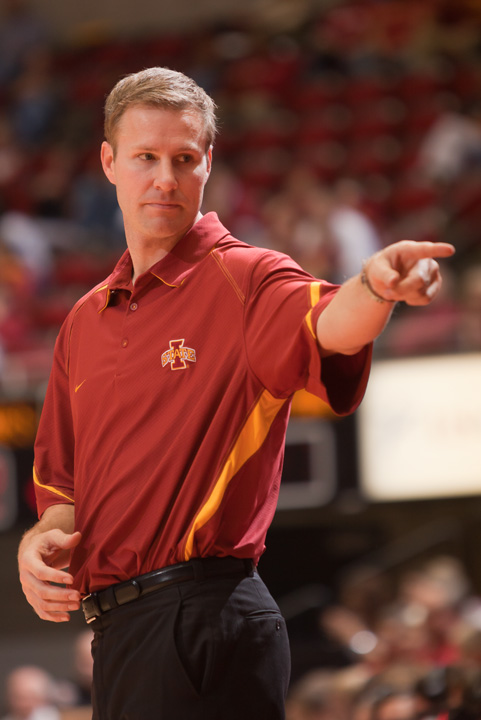
Hoiberg was the head coach of Iowa State from 2010 to 2015.

On April 27, 2010, Iowa State University announced that Hoiberg would take over as head basketball coach, replacing Greg McDermott, who left ISU to take the head coaching position at Creighton. In taking over the reins at ISU, Hoiberg became the school's 19th men's basketball coach. He won his first game, an unofficial exhibition, over Dubuque on November 5, 2010, 100–50. Hoiberg won his first official game against Northern Arizona, 78–64, on November 12, 2010, while his first Big 12 victory came against Baylor, 72–57, on January 15, 2011, in Hilton Coliseum.

In 2011–12, Hoiberg led the Cyclones to a 23–11 record and the program's first NCAA basketball tournament appearance since 2005. The season also included the team's first ranking in the AP Top 25 poll since 2005. Hoiberg was declared 2012 Big 12 Co-Coach of the Year after winning nine more games during the 2012 conference season than in 2011, the largest season-to-season improvement in Big 12 history.

In April 2013, Hoiberg signed a 10-year contract extension with Iowa State worth $20 million. Hoiberg's contract had a $2 million buyout clause if he left for another college coaching position, but the buyout was only $500,000 if he left to become an NBA head coach or general manager.

Hoiberg became the fastest coach in Iowa State history to notch 100 wins (in 148 games) on December 31, 2014, when Iowa State defeated Mississippi Valley State in Hilton Coliseum.

=== Chicago Bulls ===
On June 2, 2015, the Chicago Bulls hired Hoiberg as head coach under a 5-year contract worth $25 million. In his rookie season as head coach, the Bulls missed the playoffs for the first time in eight years, failing to meet preseason expectations. In his second season, the Bulls lost in the first round of the playoffs to the Boston Celtics after taking a 2–0 lead, and were again perceived as underachieving. In March 2017, ESPN ranked Hoiberg as the worst head coach in the league. On December 3, 2018, the Bulls fired Hoiberg after a 5–19 start to the 2018–19 season. Hoiberg was replaced by Jim Boylen as head coach.

=== Nebraska ===
On March 30, 2019, Hoiberg was named head coach of the Nebraska Cornhuskers men's basketball team. Hoiberg was born in Lincoln and his grandfather Jerry Bush was the head men's basketball coach at Nebraska from 1954 to 1963.

On March 11, 2020, during the Cornhuskers' first-round game in the Big Ten tournament against Indiana, Hoiberg fell ill. He was in visible discomfort for much of the game; when the camera panned to him at one point, he was wiping his head with his hand. He left the bench and went to the hospital with four minutes to go in the game, which the Cornhuskers lost. Amid concerns about COVID-19, the entire Cornhusker team was quarantined in the locker room for two hours after the game. Ultimately, Hoiberg was diagnosed with influenza A. In a statement posted to Twitter, Hoiberg said that he had been cleared to coach that night by tournament doctors. He stated that he would have never knowingly put "my team, my family, or anyone else" in danger. According to ESPN, the scare over Hoiberg, combined with Rudy Gobert of the Utah Jazz testing positive for COVID that night, led to a whirlwind of moves the following day that contributed to the effective end of the 2019–20 collegiate sports season. By Thursday afternoon, nearly every Division I conference had called off their tournaments, followed by the NCAA canceling that year's basketball tournament and all other spring tournaments. Soon afterward, nearly every Division I conference suspended play in all sports indefinitely.

In his fifth year as head coach at Nebraska in 2023–24, Hoiberg was named Big Ten Co-Coach of the Year after leading Nebraska to 22 wins during the regular season, the second-highest total in school history. The Huskers' third-place finish in the Big Ten was the program's best since joining the conference, and best by Nebraska since 1992–93. Hoiberg was the Huskers' first Big Ten Coach of the Year since Tim Miles was tabbed by the conference coaches in 2014 and fifth NU head coach to earn conference accolades. The award marked the second time that Hoiberg has been named coach of the year, as he was named Big 12 Co-Coach of the Year in 2012 with Kansas' Bill Self.

Hoiberg signed a contract extension on March 19, 2024, after leading the Huskers back to the NCAA tournament for the eighth time in school history and first since 2014.

The 2025-26 season was one of the best seasons in Nebraska men's basketball history. The Huskers started the season on a 20-game winning streak, the longest in program history (the previous record was 10 games in the 1977–78 season). Nebraska also achieved the highest ranking of any school in Nebraska later in the season, being ranked fifth in the AP Top 25 poll in the Week 12 release (January 26). The winning streak ended on January 27, when No. 5 Nebraska fell to No. 3 Michigan, 75–72. On March 9, 2026, Hoiberg signed a three-year extension to remain as head coach of Nebraska. Hoiberg is under contract through the 2031–32 season. Ten days later, on March 19, 2026, he led the Huskers to their first NCAA tournament win, against Troy University, after 8 losses in prior tournaments. The Huskers would win in the Round of 32 against Vanderbilt, 74–72; before falling to rival Iowa in the school's first Sweet 16 appearance, 77–71. The Huskers set the record set the program record for most wins in a season with 28.

On April 3, Hoiberg was named the Men's Basketball Coach of the Year by the Associated Press. He was the first Nebraska men's basketball coach to earn the award, and second Nebraska coach to win the award, as Connie Yori won the women's counterpart in the 2009-10 season.

== Head coaching record ==
=== College ===
Record table
Season	Team	Overall	Conference	Standing	Postseason
Iowa State Cyclones (Big 12 Conference) (2010–2015)
2010–11	Iowa State	16–16	3–13	12th	
2011–12	Iowa State	23–11	12–6	T–3rd	NCAA Division I Round of 32
2012–13	Iowa State	23–12	11–7	T–4th	NCAA Division I Round of 32
2013–14	Iowa State	28–8	11–7	T–3rd	NCAA Division I Sweet 16
2014–15	Iowa State	25–9	12–6	T–2nd	NCAA Division I Round of 64
Iowa State:		115–56 (.673)	49–39 (.557)		
Nebraska Cornhuskers (Big Ten Conference) (2019–present)
2019–20	Nebraska	7–25	2–18	14th	
2020–21	Nebraska	7–20	3–16	14th	
2021–22	Nebraska	10–22	4–16	T–13th	
2022–23	Nebraska	16–16	9–11	T–11th	
2023–24	Nebraska	23–11	12–8	T–3rd	NCAA Division I Round of 64
2024–25	Nebraska	21–14	7–13	T–12th	CBC Champions
2025–26	Nebraska	28–7	15–5	T–2nd	NCAA Division I Sweet 16
2026–27	Nebraska	6–0	0–0		
Nebraska:		118–115 (.506)	52–87 (.374)		
Total:		233–171 (.577)			
National champion Postseason invitational champion Conference regular season champion Conference regular season and conference tournament champion Division regular season champion Division regular season and conference tournament champion Conference tournament champion

=== NBA ===
Legend
Regular season	G	Games coached	W	Games won	L	Games lost	W–L %	Win–loss %
Playoffs	PG	Playoff games	PW	Playoff wins	PL	Playoff losses	PW–L %	Playoff win–loss %

Team	Year	G	W	L	W–L%	Finish	PG	PW	PL	PW–L%	Result
Chicago	2015–16	82	42	40	.512	4th in Central	—	—	—	—	Missed playoffs
Chicago	2016–17	82	41	41	.500	4th in Central	6	2	4	.333	Lost in first round
Chicago	2017–18	82	27	55	.329	5th in Central	—	—	—	—	Missed playoffs
Chicago	2018–19	24	5	19	.208	(fired)	—	—	—	—	—
Career		270	115	155	.426		6	2	4	.333	

== Personal life ==
Hoiberg is the son of an Iowa State sociology professor father and elementary school teacher mother, and received a degree in finance from ISU in 1995. His grandfather, Jerry Bush, was also once the head basketball coach at Nebraska. When growing up in Ames, he lived within walking distance of ISU's basketball arena, Hilton Coliseum. He and his wife Carol, also from Ames, have four children (Paige, Jack, and twins Sam and Charlie).

On April 17, 2015, Hoiberg underwent a successful replacement of his aortic valve at the Mayo Clinic in Rochester, Minnesota.
