= 2025–26 Nebraska Cornhuskers men's basketball team =

American college basketball season

2025–26 Nebraska Cornhuskers men's basketball

Hall of Fame Classic Champions

NCAA tournament, Sweet Sixteen
- Conference: Big Ten Conference

Ranking
- Coaches: No. 14
- AP: No. 14
- Record: 28–7 (15–5 Big Ten)
- Head coach: Fred Hoiberg (7th season)
- Assistant coaches: Nate Loenser; Ernie Zeigler; Pat Monaghan; Padyn Borders
- Home arena: Pinnacle Bank Arena

2025–26 Big Ten Conference men's basketball standings
	Conf.				Overall
Team	W		L	PCT	W		L	PCT
No. 1 Michigan	19	–	1	.950	37	–	3	.925
No. 14 Nebraska	15	–	5	.750	28	–	7	.800
No. 5 Illinois	15	–	5	.750	28	–	9	.757
No. 11 Michigan State	15	–	5	.750	27	–	8	.771
No. 25 Wisconsin	14	–	6	.700	24	–	11	.686
No. 6 Purdue †	13	–	7	.650	30	–	9	.769
UCLA	13	–	7	.650	24	–	12	.667
Ohio State	12	–	8	.600	21	–	13	.618
No. 15 Iowa	10	–	10	.500	24	–	13	.649
Indiana	9	–	11	.450	18	–	14	.563
Minnesota	8	–	12	.400	15	–	18	.455
USC	7	–	13	.350	18	–	14	.563
Washington	7	–	13	.350	16	–	17	.485
Rutgers	6	–	14	.300	14	–	20	.412
Northwestern	5	–	15	.250	15	–	19	.441
Oregon	5	–	15	.250	12	–	20	.375
Maryland	4	–	16	.200	12	–	21	.364
Penn State	3	–	17	.150	12	–	20	.375
† 2026 Big Ten tournament winner Rankings from AP poll

The 2025–26 Nebraska Cornhuskers men's basketball team represented the University of Nebraska–Lincoln in the 2025–26 NCAA Division I men's basketball season. The Cornhuskers were led by seventh-year head coach Fred Hoiberg and played their home games at Pinnacle Bank Arena in Lincoln, Nebraska as members of the Big Ten Conference.

The Cornhuskers won the first NCAA men's tournament game in the program's history on March 19, 2026, with a 76–47 victory over the Troy Trojans.

== Previous season ==
The Cornhuskers finished the 2024–25 season 21–14, 7–13 in Big Ten play to finish in a five-way tie for 12th place. Due to tiebreaking procedures, they failed to qualify for the Big Ten tournament. The Cornhuskers received an invitation to the inaugural College Basketball Crown tournament where they defeated Arizona State, Georgetown, and Boise State to advance to the tournament championship game where they defeated UCF.

== Offseason ==
=== Departures ===
Nebraska departures
Name	Number	Pos.	Height	Weight	Year	Hometown	Reason for departure
Ahron Ulis	2	G	6'3"	190	Senior	Chicago Heights, IL	Graduated
Brice Williams	3	F	6'7"	213	Senior	Huntersville, NC	Graduated
Juwan Gary	4	F	6'6"	221	(redshirt) Senior	Columbia, SC	Graduated
Jeffrey Grace III	8	G	6'3"	197	(redshirt) Junior	Elmhurst, IL	Walk-on; not on team roster
Gavin Griffiths	12	G	6'8"	193	Sophomore	Simsbury, CT	Transferred to Temple
Andrew Morgan	23	F	6'10"	245	Senior	Waseca, MN	Graduated
Rollie Worster	24	G	6'4"	205	Senior	Missoula, MT	Graduated
Nick Janowski	25	G	6'3"	200	Freshman	Pewaukee, WI	Transferred to St. Thomas (MN)
Braxton Meah	34	C	7'1"	250	Graduate Student	Layton, UT	Graduated

=== Incoming transfers ===
Nebraska incoming transfers
Name	Number	Pos.	Height	Weight	Year	Hometown	Previous school
Kendall Blue	2	G	6'6"	190	Senior	Woodbury, MN	St. Thomas (MN)
Will Cooper	6	F	6'6"	210	Sophomore	Omaha, NE	Air Force
Jamarques Lawrence	10	G	6'3"	183	Senior	Plainfield, NJ	Rhode Island
Ugnius Jarusevicius	13	F	6'10"	220	Senior	Alytus, Lithuania	Central Michigan
Jared Garcia	15	F	6'8"	240	Graduate Student	Houston, TX	Tulsa
Pryce Sandfort	21	F	6'6"	205	Junior	Waukee, IA	Iowa

=== 2025 recruiting class ===
College recruiting
Name	Hometown	School	Height	Weight	Commit date
Quentin Rhymes; SF	Las Vegas, NV	Hillcrest Prep	6 ft 7 in (2.01 m)	215 lb (98 kg)	Sep 22, 2024
Quentin Rhymes; SF	Recruit ratings: Rivals: 247Sports: On3: (NR)				
Leo Curtis; C	Cambridge, MA	CATS Academy	7 ft 1 in (2.16 m)	220 lb (100 kg)	May 28, 2025
Leo Curtis; C	Recruit ratings: Rivals: 247Sports: On3: (NR)				
Overall recruit ranking:
Note: In many cases, Scout, Rivals, 247Sports, On3, and ESPN may conflict in their listings of height and weight.; In these cases, the average was taken. ESPN grades are on a 100-point scale.; Sources: "2025 Team Ranking". Rivals.

== Roster ==
2025–26 Nebraska Cornhuskers men's basketball team
Players
Coaches

Pos.	#	Name	Height	Weight	Year	Previous school	Hometown
G	0	Connor Essegian (injured)	6 ft 4 in (1.93 m)	190 lb (86 kg)	Sr	Wisconsin	Fort Wayne, IN
G	1	Sam Hoiberg (W)	6 ft 0 in (1.83 m)	185 lb (84 kg)	RS Sr	Pius X HS	Lincoln, NE
G	2	Kendall Blue	6 ft 6 in (1.98 m)	195 lb (88 kg)	Sr	St. Thomas (MN)	Woodbury, MN
G	5	Braden Frager	6 ft 6 in (1.98 m)	220 lb (100 kg)	RS Fr	Lincoln Southwest HS	Lincoln, NE
F	6	Will Cooper	6 ft 6 in (1.98 m)	210 lb (95 kg)	So	Air Force	Omaha, NE
G	7	Justin Bolis (W)	6 ft 8 in (2.03 m)	225 lb (102 kg)	RS So	Southeast CC	Lincoln, NE
F	9	Berke Büyüktuncel	6 ft 10 in (2.08 m)	244 lb (111 kg)	Jr	UCLA	Bursa, Turkey
G	10	Jamarques Lawrence	6 ft 3 in (1.91 m)	183 lb (83 kg)	Sr	Rhode Island	Plainfield, NJ
G	11	Quentin Rhymes	6 ft 6 in (1.98 m)	195 lb (88 kg)	Fr	Hillcrest Prep	Las Vegas, NV
F	13	Ugnius Jarusevicius	6 ft 10 in (2.08 m)	220 lb (100 kg)	Sr	Central Michigan	Alytus, Lithuania
F	15	Jared Garcia	6 ft 8 in (2.03 m)	245 lb (111 kg)	GS	Tulsa	Houston, TX
F	21	Pryce Sandfort	6 ft 7 in (2.01 m)	215 lb (98 kg)	Jr	Iowa	Waukee, IA
G	31	Cale Jacobsen (W)	6 ft 4 in (1.93 m)	200 lb (91 kg)	RS Jr	Ashland-Greenwood HS	Ashland, NE
F	33	Leo Curtis	7 ft 1 in (2.16 m)	220 lb (100 kg)	Fr	CATS Academy	Reykjavík, Iceland
F	35	Henry Burt (W)	6 ft 7 in (2.01 m)	222 lb (101 kg)	RS Jr	Elkhorn South HS	Omaha, NE
F	51	Rienk Mast	6 ft 10 in (2.08 m)	250 lb (113 kg)	RS Sr	Bradley	Groningen, Netherlands

Head coach

- Fred Hoiberg (Iowa State)

Assistant coach(es)

- Nate Loenser (Iowa State)
- Ernie Zeigler (Cleary)
- Pat Monaghan (Lewis)
- Padyn Borders (Nebraska)

Legend

- (C) Team captain
- (S) Suspended
- (I) Ineligible
- (W) Walk-on
- Injured
- Current redshirt

Roster

== Schedule and results ==
When Nebraska started the season 4–0 with a November 15 victory over Oklahoma, it achieved its first 8-game win streak since the 2010–11 team won 11 in a row. On November 25, the team achieved a 7–0 start and its 11th consecutive victory (spanning back to the prior season), which was only the fourth (1990–91, 1993–94 and 2010–11) 11-game streak in school history. Nebraska entered the AP Poll for the first time since the 2018–19 rankings after its 9–0 start. On December 10, Nebraska defeated Wisconsin to reach a 10–0 start and 14 consecutive victories matching school records set by the 1977–78 Cornhuskers and 1990–91 team, respectively. On December 30, 2025, Nebraska completed an undefeated non-conference schedule with a win over New Hampshire, which had not happened since the 1928-29 Cornhuskers. On January 5, 2026, the Cornhuskers entered the top 10 in the AP Poll in the 2025–26 rankings, which was a first since the 1965–66 Cornhuskers (led by Grant Simmons and Stu Lantz, which peaked at No. 8 in the 1965–66 rankings). This also surpassed the No. 11 ranking achieved by the 1990–91 Cornhuskers. Also on January 5, Nebraska defeated Ohio State to reach 4–0 in conference play for the first time since the 1975–76 Cornhuskers. On January 19, the team moved to number 7 in the AP Poll, which was a school record. The following week the school achieved a number 5 ranking following a 20–0 start. Its 24-game winning streak was the best by a Big Ten team since the 2010–11 Ohio State Buckeyes men's basketball team started the season 24–0. On March 8, 2026 with a win over Iowa, Nebraska finished with a program record for conference wins in a season with 15, as well as a program record for regular season victories with 26. The previous bests for conference wins in a season and regular season wins, were 13 and 24 respectively. With the victory over Iowa, Nebraska secured a 2-seed in the Big Ten Tournament, which betters the previous best mark of a 3-seed. The 2025-26 Nebraska team also matched the program record for wins in a season with 26. The 26 season wins mark was set by the 1990-91 Nebraska team. The 2026 Big Ten Tournament would take place at the United Center in Chicago from March 10-16.

Date time, TV	Rank^{#}	Opponent^{#}	Result	Record	High points	High rebounds	High assists	Site (attendance) city, state
Exhibition
October 18, 2025*; 12:00 p.m., B1G+		No. 8 BYU	W 90–89	–	31 – Mast	7 – Lawrence	9 – Lawrence	Pinnacle Bank Arena (14,992); Lincoln, NE
October 27, 2025*; 6:30 p.m., B1G+		Midland	W 91–50	–	21 – Frager	7 – Tied	5 – Blue	Pinnacle Bank Arena (13,703); Lincoln, NE
Regular Season
November 3, 2025*; 7:00 p.m., B1G+		West Georgia	W 86–53	1–0	18 – Lawrence	11 – Mast	6 – Lawrence	Pinnacle Bank Arena (13,555); Lincoln, NE
November 8, 2025*; 12:00 p.m., B1G+		FIU	W 96–66	2–0	20 – Sandfort	12 – Mast	10 – Mast	Pinnacle Bank Arena (14,023); Lincoln, NE
November 11, 2025*; 7:00 p.m., B1G+		Maryland Eastern Shore	W 69–50	3–0	19 – Sandfort	7 – Hoiberg	4 – Hoiberg	Pinnacle Bank Arena (13,653); Lincoln, NE
November 15, 2025*; 6:00 p.m., BTN		vs. Oklahoma	W 105–99	4–0	28 – Sandfort	6 – Tied	7 – Sandfort	Sanford Pentagon (3,463); Sioux Falls, SD
November 20, 2025*; 6:00 p.m., Peacock		vs. New Mexico; Hall of Fame Classic semifinals	W 84–72	5–0	21 – Lawrence	8 – Frager	6 – Hoiberg	T-Mobile Center (5,278); Kansas City, MO
November 21, 2025*; 8:30 p.m., Peacock		vs. Kansas State; Hall of Fame Classic Championship Game	W 86–85	6–0	21 – Sandfort	8 – Büyüktuncel	5 – Lawrence	T-Mobile Center (6,743); Kansas City, MO
November 25, 2025*; 7:30 p.m., BTN		Winthrop	W 80–73	7–0	31 – Mast	7 – Sandfort	5 – Hoiberg	Pinnacle Bank Arena (13,973); Lincoln, NE
November 29, 2025*; 1:00 p.m., B1G+		USC Upstate	W 72–63	8–0	20 – Sandfort	9 – Sandfort	4 – Sandfort	Pinnacle Bank Arena (14,107); Lincoln, NE
December 7, 2025*; 4:00 p.m., FS1		Creighton; Rivalry	W 71–50	9–0	20 – Mast	13 – Büyüktuncel	5 – Hoiberg	Pinnacle Bank Arena (15,256); Lincoln, NE
December 10, 2025; 8:00 p.m., BTN	No. 23	Wisconsin	W 90–60	10–0 (1–0)	17 – Mast	10 – Mast	7 – Lawrence	Pinnacle Bank Arena (13,831); Lincoln, NE
December 13, 2025; 3:00 p.m., Peacock	No. 23	at No. 13 Illinois	W 83–80	11–0 (2–0)	32 – Sandfort	7 – Mast	6 – Tied	State Farm Center (15,266); Champaign, IL
December 21, 2025*; 7:00 p.m., BTN	No. 15	North Dakota	W 78–55	12–0	17 – Frager	11 – Büyüktuncel	10 – Büyüktuncel	Pinnacle Bank Arena (14,519); Lincoln, NE
December 30, 2025*; 8:00 p.m., BTN	No. 13	New Hampshire	W 86–55	13–0	19 – Sandfort	10 – Hoiberg	5 – Mast	Pinnacle Bank Arena (14,497); Lincoln, NE
January 2, 2026; 8:00 p.m., Peacock	No. 13	No. 9 Michigan State	W 58–56	14–0 (3–0)	19 – Mast	7 – Mast	5 – Hoiberg	Pinnacle Bank Arena (14,841); Lincoln, NE
January 5, 2026; 5:30 p.m., FS1	No. 10	at Ohio State	W 72–69	15–0 (4–0)	15 – Frager	9 – Hoiberg	4 – Hoiberg	Value City Arena (10,382); Columbus, OH
January 10, 2026; 11:00 a.m., BTN	No. 10	at Indiana	W 83–77	16–0 (5–0)	27 – Lawrence	6 – Mast	5 – Hoiberg	Simon Skjodt Assembly Hall (13,407); Bloomington, IN
January 13, 2026; 8:00 p.m., BTN	No. 8	Oregon	W 90–55	17–0 (6–0)	28 – Sandfort	5 – Garcia	5 – Hoiberg	Pinnacle Bank Arena (15,163); Lincoln, NE
January 17, 2026; 3:00 p.m., BTN	No. 8	at Northwestern	W 77–58	18–0 (7–0)	22 – Sandfort	7 – Hoiberg	4 – Tied	Welsh–Ryan Arena (5,783); Evanston, IL
January 21, 2026; 8:00 p.m., BTN	No. 7	Washington	W 76–66	19–0 (8–0)	23 – Sandfort	7 – Tied	4 – Tied	Pinnacle Bank Arena (15,203); Lincoln, NE
January 24, 2026; 11:00 a.m., FS1	No. 7	at Minnesota	W 76–57	20–0 (9–0)	22 – Sandfort	10 – Sandfort	7 – Hoiberg	Williams Arena (11,339); Minneapolis, MN
January 27, 2026; 6:00 p.m., Peacock	No. 5	at No. 3 Michigan	L 72–75	20–1 (9–1)	20 – Tied	7 – Hoiberg	5 – Hoiberg	Crisler Center (12,707); Ann Arbor, MI
February 1, 2026; 3:00 p.m., FS1	No. 5	No. 9 Illinois	L 69–78	20–2 (9–2)	20 – Frager	6 – Tied	6 – Hoiberg	Pinnacle Bank Arena (15,513); Lincoln, NE
February 7, 2026; 11:00 a.m., BTN	No. 9	at Rutgers	W 80–68	21–2 (10–2)	26 – Mast	8 – Mast	7 – Lawrence	Jersey Mike's Arena (8,000); Piscataway, NJ
February 10, 2026; 6:00 p.m., FS1	No. 7	No. 13 Purdue	L 77–80 ^{OT}	21–3 (10–3)	18 – Mast	6 – Mast	7 – Mast	Pinnacle Bank Arena (15,185); Lincoln, NE
February 14, 2026; 12:00 p.m., BTN	No. 7	Northwestern	W 68–49	22–3 (11–3)	29 – Sandfort	9 – Mast	5 – Hoiberg	Pinnacle Bank Arena (15,262); Lincoln, NE
February 17, 2026; 8:00 p.m., BTN	No. 9	at Iowa; Rivalry	L 52–57	22–4 (11–4)	13 – Sandfort	8 – Mast	5 – Hoiberg	Carver–Hawkeye Arena (11,483); Iowa City, IA
February 21, 2026; 1:00 p.m., BTN	No. 9	Penn State	W 87–64	23–4 (12–4)	33 – Sandfort	9 – Sandfort	10 – Hoiberg	Pinnacle Bank Arena (15,128); Lincoln, NE
February 25, 2026; 6:00 p.m., BTN	No. 12	Maryland	W 74–61	24–4 (13–4)	21 – Frager	8 – Tied	6 – Lawrence	Pinnacle Bank Arena (15,028); Lincoln, NE
February 28, 2026; 3:00 p.m., BTN	No. 12	at USC	W 82–67	25–4 (14–4)	32 – Sandfort	8 – Frager	7 – Lawrence	Galen Center (6,645); Los Angeles, CA
March 3, 2026; 10:00 p.m., FS1	No. 9	at UCLA	L 52–72	25–5 (14–5)	12 – Hoiberg	5 – Tied	5 – Lawrence	Pauley Pavilion (9,027); Los Angeles, CA
March 8, 2026; 4:00 p.m., FOX	No. 9	Iowa; Rivalry	W 84–75 ^{OT}	26–5 (15–5)	15 – Tied	8 – Jacobsen	6 – Lawrence	Pinnacle Bank Arena (15,340); Lincoln, NE
Big Ten Tournament
March 13, 2026; 5:30 p.m., BTN	(2) No. 11	vs. (7) No. 18 Purdue; Quarterfinal	L 58–74	26–6	15 – Sandfort	8 – Hoiberg	4 – Hoiberg	United Center (18,988); Chicago, IL
NCAA Tournament
March 19, 2026; 11:40 a.m., truTV	(4 S) No. 15	vs. (13 S) Troy; First round	W 76–47	27–6	23 – Sandfort	9 – Hoiberg	7 – Mast	Paycom Center (15,677); Oklahoma City, OK
March 21, 2026; 7:45 p.m., TNT	(4 S) No. 15	vs. (5 S) No. 16 Vanderbilt; Second round	W 74–72	28–6	15 – Tied	5 – Tied	6 – Hoiberg	Paycom Center (14,887); Oklahoma City, OK
March 26, 2026; 6:30 p.m., TBS	(4 S) No. 15	vs. (9 S) Iowa; Sweet Sixteen / Rivalry	L 71–77	28–7	25 – Sandfort	10 – Büyüktuncel	6 – Hoiberg	Toyota Center (17,307); Houston, TX
*Non-conference game. ^{#}Rankings from AP poll. (#) Tournament seedings in parentheses. S=South. All times are in Central Time.

== Rankings ==
Ranking movements Legend: ██ Increase in ranking ██ Decrease in ranking — = Not ranked RV = Received votes т = Tied with team above or below
	Week																				
Poll	Pre	1	2	3	4	5	6	7	8	9	10	11	12	13	14	15	16	17	18	19	Final
AP	—	—	—	RV	RV	23	15	13	13	10	8	7	5	9	7	9	12	9	11	15	14
Coaches	—	—	—	RV	RV	22	15	13	13т	11	10	7	5	9	8	9	10	9	10	14	14
