= Sam Hoiberg =

American basketball player (born 2003)

No. 55 – Valley Suns
- Position: Point guard / shooting guard
- League: NBA G League

Personal information
- Born: March 21, 2003 (age 23) Chicago, Illinois, U.S.
- Listed height: 6 ft 0 in (1.83 m)
- Listed weight: 175 lb (79 kg)

Career information
- High school: Hinsdale Central (Hinsdale, Illinois); Pius X (Lincoln, Nebraska)
- College: Nebraska (2022–2026)
- NBA draft: 2026: undrafted
- Playing career: 2026–present

Career history
- 2026–present: Valley Suns

Career highlights
- Big Ten All-Defensive Team (2026); First-team Academic All-American (2026)
- Stats at NBA.com
- Stats at Basketball Reference

Samuel Hoiberg (born March 21, 2003) is an American basketball player for the Valley Suns of the NBA G League. He played college basketball for the Nebraska Cornhuskers.

== Early life and high school ==
Hoiberg initially attended Hinsdale Central High School in Hinsdale, Illinois while his father, Fred Hoiberg was the head coach of the Chicago Bulls. He moved with his family to Lincoln, Nebraska and transferred to Pius X High School following his father being fired by the Bulls and taking the head coach position at Nebraska. Hoiberg decided to play college basketball for his father at Nebraska, having no college offers after high school.

== College career ==
Hoiberg redshirted his freshman season with the Nebraska Cornhuskers. He averaged 4.1 points and 1.8 rebounds per game during his redshirt freshman season. The next year he averaged 3.4 points, 2.9 rebounds and 1.7 assists per game. Hoiberg again played in all of Nebraska's games as a redshirt junior and averaged 3.9 points, 2.3 rebounds, 1.9 assists, and 1.0 steals per game.

Hoiberg became a starter entering his redshirt senior season. That 2025–26 Nebraska team won the first NCAA men's tournament game in the program's history on March 19, 2026, with a 76–47 victory over the Troy Trojans. Hoiberg was an All-Big Ten Conference Defensive Team selection. The team reached the Sweet Sixteen round and finished with a 28–7 record. Hoiberg's 2.0 steals per game was second in the Big Ten and he set the school record for assist-to-turnover ratio (3.74). Hoiberg joined his father as a first-team Academic All-America honoree (the school's first since Shavon Shields in 2015 and 2016).
