= Iowa–Nebraska men's basketball rivalry =

American college basketball rivalry

- Iowa Hawkeyes Nebraska Cornhuskers
- Sport: Basketball
- First meeting: January 28, 1907; Nebraska, 27–17
- Latest meeting: March 26, 2026; Iowa, 77–71
- Next meeting: January 16, 2027
- Stadiums: Carver-Hawkeye Arena; Pinnacle Bank Arena

Statistics
- Total meetings: 45
- All-time series: Iowa leads, 29–16
- Largest victory: Iowa, 102–64 (2021)
- Longest win streak: Iowa, 5 (2013–2016)
- Current win streak: Iowa, 1 (2026)

Locations of Iowa and Nebraska

The Iowa–Nebraska men's basketball rivalry is an intra-conference college basketball border rivalry between the Iowa Hawkeyes and Nebraska Cornhuskers. The programs represent the University of Iowa and the University of Nebraska–Lincoln.

== Series history ==
=== Nonconference series ===
Although Iowa and Nebraska first met on the football field in 1891, the two teams did not meet on the basketball court until January 28, 1907, a game played in Lincoln, Nebraska, which resulted in a 27–17 Nebraska victory. Iowa then twice defeated Nebraska in Iowa City in a game later that year and in another the following year in 1908. The two schools would go on to schedule several series throughout the twentieth century, including three games in the early 1930s, a yearly series from 1941 to 1945, another yearly series from 1953 to 1956, and two home-and-home sets in 1970–71 and 1975–76. There were a total of 19 games played between Iowa and Nebraska during the twentieth century, with Iowa leading the series 12–7.

=== Conference series ===
After a hiatus of 35 years during which Nebraska and Iowa did not face off in men's basketball, the series was renewed when Nebraska joined the Big Ten Conference in 2011. Iowa has won the majority of the games against Nebraska as members of the Big Ten Conference, several of which have been decided in overtime. The only ranked matchup between the two schools came in 2019 when #24 Nebraska was defeated by #25 Iowa. The most lopsided victory came in 2021, when #5 Iowa defeated Nebraska 102–64. On February 17, 2026, unranked Iowa upset #9 Nebraska in Iowa City, winning a low-scoring 57–52 game which resulted in Iowa fans storming the court at Carver-Hawkeye Arena. The game was made more acrimonious due to the fact that former Iowa player Pryce Sandfort had transferred to Nebraska before the start of the season.

Until 2026, Nebraska and Iowa had never met in any postseason tournament play. In the 2026 NCAA Tournament, 4th-seeded Nebraska defeated Vanderbilt and 9th-seeded Iowa upset 1st-seeded Florida to both reach the Sweet Sixteen. In a game in which Nebraska led or was tied with Iowa for all but the final two minutes and ten seconds, Iowa secured the 77–71 win to advance to its first Elite Eight appearance since 1987.

== Game results ==
Iowa victories	Nebraska victories	Tie games

No.	Date	Location	Winner	Score
1	January 28, 1907	Lincoln	Nebraska	27–17
2	February 22, 1907	Iowa City	Iowa	32–29
3	March 6, 1908	Iowa City	Iowa	39–26
4	January 25, 1930	Lincoln	Nebraska	41–26
5	December 19, 1931	Iowa City	Iowa	34–29
6	December 20, 1934	Lincoln	Iowa	31–24
7	December 30, 1941	Iowa City	Nebraska	41–34
8	December 19, 1942	Lincoln	Nebraska	52–43
9	December 10, 1943	Iowa City	Iowa	50–33
10	December 16, 1944	Lincoln	Iowa	61–45
11	December 17, 1945	Iowa City	Iowa	61–35
12	December 12, 1953	Lincoln	Nebraska	81–70
13	December 6, 1954	Iowa City	Iowa	84–61
14	December 3, 1955	Iowa City	Iowa	60–51
15	December 3, 1956	Lincoln	Nebraska	67–43
16	December 5, 1970	Lincoln	Nebraska	73–71
17	December 21, 1971	Iowa City	Iowa	86–77
18	December 2, 1975	Iowa City	Iowa	72–65
19	November 27, 1976	Lincoln	Iowa	71–57
20	January 26, 2012	Iowa City	Nebraska	79–73
21	February 29, 2012	Lincoln	Iowa	62–53
22	February 23, 2013	Lincoln	Nebraska	64–60
23	March 9, 2013	Iowa City	Iowa	74–60

No.	Date	Location	Winner	Score
24	December 31, 2013	Iowa City	#22 Iowa	67–57
25	January 5, 2015	Iowa City	Iowa	70–59
26	February 22, 2015	Lincoln	Iowa	74–46
27	January 5, 2016	Iowa City	Iowa	77–66
28	January 5, 2017	Lincoln	Nebraska	93–90^{2OT}
29	February 5, 2017	Iowa City	Iowa	81–70
30	January 27, 2018	Lincoln	Nebraska	98–84
31	January 6, 2019	Iowa City	#25 Iowa	93–84
32	March 10, 2019	Lincoln	Nebraska	93–91^{OT}
33	January 7, 2020	Lincoln	Nebraska	76–70
34	February 8, 2020	Iowa City	#17 Iowa	96–72
35	March 4, 2021	Iowa City	#5 Iowa	102–64
36	February 13, 2022	Iowa City	Iowa	98–75
37	February 25, 2022	Lincoln	#25 Iowa	88–78
38	December 29, 2022	Lincoln	Nebraska	66–50
39	March 4, 2023	Iowa City	Nebraska	81–77
40	January 12, 2024	Iowa City	Iowa	94–76
41	January 7, 2025	Iowa City	Iowa	97–87^{OT}
42	March 9, 2025	Lincoln	Iowa	83–68
43	February 17, 2026	Iowa City	Iowa	57–52
44	March 8, 2026	Lincoln	#9 Nebraska	84–75^{OT}
45	March 26, 2026	Houston	Iowa	77–71
Series: Iowa leads 29–16

== See also ==
- Iowa–Nebraska football rivalry
