= List of All-Big 12 Conference men's basketball teams =

The All-Big 12 men's basketball team is an annual Big 12 Conference honor bestowed on the best players in the conference following every college basketball season. Big 12 coaches select a 10-player first team, a five-player second team and a five-player third team. There were three five-man teams from 1996 though 2024.

== Selections ==
*	Named Big 12 Player of the Year that season. Awarded since 1996.
†	Named co-Big 12 Players of the Year that season.

=== 1996–1999 ===
Season	First team		Second team		Third team		Ref
Season	Players	Teams	Players	Teams	Players	Teams	Ref
1996–97	Tony Battie	Texas Tech	Cory Carr	Texas Tech	Kelvin Cato	Iowa State	
1996–97	Chauncey Billups	Colorado	Nate Erdmann	Oklahoma	Kenny Pratt	Iowa State	
1996–97	Reggie Freeman	Texas	Tyronn Lue	Nebraska	Paul Pierce	Kansas	
1996–97	Raef LaFrentz*	Kansas	Brian Skinner	Baylor	Kelly Thames	Missouri	
1996–97	Dedric Willoughby	Iowa State	Jacque Vaughn	Kansas	Chianti Roberts	Oklahoma State	
1997–98	Corey Brewer	Oklahoma	Kris Clack	Texas	Manny Dies	Kansas State	
1997–98	Cory Carr	Texas Tech	Adrian Peterson	Oklahoma State	Marcus Fizer	Iowa State	
1997–98	Paul Pierce	Kansas	Brett Robisch	Oklahoma State	Shanne Jones	Texas A&M	
1997–98	Raef LaFrentz*	Kansas	Brian Skinner	Baylor	Desmond Mason	Oklahoma State	
1997–98	Tyronn Lue	Nebraska	Kelly Thames	Missouri	Billy Thomas	Kansas	
1998–99	Venson Hamilton*	Nebraska	Eric Chenowith	Kansas	Cookie Belcher	Nebraska	
1998–99	Chris Mihm	Texas	Marcus Fizer	Iowa State	Kris Clack	Texas	
1998–99	Gabe Muoneke	Texas	Desmond Mason	Oklahoma State	Clifton Cook	Texas A&M	
1998–99	Adrian Peterson	Oklahoma State	Eduardo Najera	Oklahoma	Ryan Humphrey	Oklahoma	
1998–99	Albert White	Missouri	Rayford Young	Texas Tech	Kenny Price	Colorado	

=== 2000–2009 ===
Season	First team		Second team		Third team		Ref
Season	Players	Teams	Players	Teams	Players	Teams	Ref
1999–00	Marcus Fizer*	Iowa State	Keyon Dooling	Missouri	Kimani Ffriend	Nebraska	
1999–00	Desmond Mason	Oklahoma State	Gabe Muoneke	Texas	Clarence Gilbert	Missouri	
1999–00	Chris Mihm	Texas	Kenny Gregory	Kansas	Bernard King	Texas A&M	
1999–00	Eduardo Najera	Oklahoma	Jamaal Tinsley	Iowa State	Brian Montonati	Oklahoma State	
1999–00	Jaquay Walls	Colorado	Rayford Young	Texas Tech	Jamahl Mosley	Colorado	
1999–00	N/A	N/A	N/A	N/A	J.R. Raymond	Oklahoma	
2000–01	Maurice Baker	Oklahoma State	Cookie Belcher	Nebraska	Maurice Evans	Texas	
2000–01	Terry Black	Baylor	Drew Gooden	Kansas	Kirk Hinrich	Kansas	
2000–01	Nick Collison	Kansas	Kenny Gregory	Kansas	Kantrail Horton	Iowa State	
2000–01	Kareem Rush	Missouri	Fredrik Jonzen	Oklahoma State	Nolan Johnson	Oklahoma	
2000–01	Jamaal Tinsley*	Iowa State	Chris Owens	Texas	Darren Kelly	Texas	
2001–02	Andre Emmett	Texas Tech	Nick Collison	Kansas	Clarence Gilbert	Missouri	
2001–02	Drew Gooden*	Kansas	Andy Ellis	Texas Tech	Fredrik Jonzen	Oklahoma State	
2001–02	Kirk Hinrich	Kansas	T. J. Ford	Texas	Stéphane Pelle	Colorado	
2001–02	Aaron McGhee	Oklahoma	Tyray Pearson	Iowa State	Jake Sullivan	Iowa State	
2001–02	Hollis Price	Oklahoma	Larry Reid	Kansas State	James Thomas	Texas	
2001–02	Kareem Rush	Missouri	N/A	N/A	N/A	N/A	
2002–03	Nick Collison*	Kansas	Arthur Johnson	Missouri	Brandon Mouton	Texas	
2002–03	Andre Emmett	Texas Tech	Michel Morandais	Colorado	Stéphane Pelle	Colorado	
2002–03	Kirk Hinrich	Kansas	Rickey Paulding	Missouri	Lawrence Roberts	Baylor	
2002–03	T. J. Ford	Texas	James Thomas	Texas	Jake Sullivan	Iowa State	
2002–03	Hollis Price	Oklahoma	Victor Williams	Oklahoma State	Quannas White	Oklahoma	
2003–04	Tony Allen*	Oklahoma State	Arthur Johnson	Missouri	Nate Johnson	Nebraska	
2003–04	Andre Emmett	Texas Tech	Keith Langford	Kansas	Joey Graham	Oklahoma State	
2003–04	David Harrison	Colorado	Brandon Mouton	Texas	Jeremiah Massey	Kansas State	
2003–04	John Lucas III	Oklahoma State	Michel Morandais	Colorado	Aaron Miles	Kansas	
2003–04	Wayne Simien	Kansas	Rickey Paulding	Missouri	Jackson Vroman	Iowa State	
2004–05	Joey Graham	Oklahoma State	Brad Buckman	Texas	Kevin Bookout	Oklahoma	
2004–05	Taj Gray	Oklahoma	Keith Langford	Kansas	Daniel Gibson	Texas	
2004–05	John Lucas III	Oklahoma State	Jeremiah Massey	Kansas State	Jared Homan	Iowa State	
2004–05	Ronald Ross	Texas Tech	Curtis Stinson	Iowa State	Jarrius Jackson	Texas Tech	
2004–05	Wayne Simien*	Kansas	Antoine Wright	Texas A&M	Aaron Miles	Kansas	
2005–06	LaMarcus Aldridge	Texas	Terrell Everett	Oklahoma	Will Blalock	Iowa State	
2005–06	Jarrius Jackson	Texas Tech	Taj Gray	Oklahoma	Brad Buckman	Texas	
2005–06	Richard Roby	Colorado	Joseph Jones	Texas A&M	Thomas Gardner	Missouri	
2005–06	Brandon Rush	Kansas	Cartier Martin	Kansas State	Daniel Gibson	Texas	
2005–06	P. J. Tucker*	Texas	Curtis Stinson	Iowa State	Acie Law	Texas A&M	
2006–07	Mario Boggan	Oklahoma State	D. J. Augustin	Texas	Nate Cater	Oklahoma	
2006–07	Kevin Durant*	Texas	David Hoskins	Kansas State	Mario Chalmers	Kansas	
2006–07	Jarrius Jackson	Texas Tech	Joseph Jones	Texas A&M	JamesOn Curry	Oklahoma State	
2006–07	Acie Law	Texas A&M	Aleks Marić	Nebraska	Stefhon Hannah	Missouri	
2006–07	Brandon Rush	Kansas	Cartier Martin	Kansas State	Martin Zeno	Texas Tech	
2006–07	Julian Wright	Kansas	N/A	N/A	N/A	N/A	
2007–08	Darrell Arthur	Kansas	A. J. Abrams	Texas	Byron Eaton	Oklahoma State	
2007–08	Michael Beasley*	Kansas State	Mario Chalmers	Kansas	Jiri Hubalek	Iowa State	
2007–08	Curtis Jerrells	Baylor	Damion James	Texas	Darnell Jackson	Kansas	
2007–08	Blake Griffin	Oklahoma	Aleks Marić	Nebraska	Richard Roby	Colorado	
2007–08	Brandon Rush	Kansas	Martin Zeno	Texas Tech	Bill Walker	Kansas State	
2008–09	Cole Aldrich	Kansas	A.J. Abrams	Texas	Josh Carter	Texas A&M	
2008–09	Craig Brackins	Iowa State	James Anderson	Oklahoma State	Ade Dagunduro	Nebraska	
2008–09	DeMarre Carroll	Missouri	Denis Clemente	Kansas State	Byron Eaton	Oklahoma State	
2008–09	Sherron Collins	Kansas	Damion James	Texas	Cory Higgins	Colorado	
2008–09	Blake Griffin*	Oklahoma	Willie Warren	Oklahoma	Curtis Jerrells	Baylor	
2008–09	N/A	N/A	N/A	N/A	Leo Lyons	Missouri	

=== 2010–2019 ===
Season	First team		Second team		Third team		Ref
Season	Players	Teams	Players	Teams	Players	Teams	Ref
2009–10	Cole Aldrich	Kansas	Craig Brackins	Iowa State	Tweety Carter	Baylor	
2009–10	James Anderson*	Oklahoma State	Denis Clemente	Kansas State	Tommy Bryan Davis	Texas A&M	
2009–10	Sherron Collins	Kansas	LaceDarius Dunn	Baylor	Kim English	Missouri	
2009–10	Damion James	Texas	Marcus Morris Sr.	Kansas	Cory Higgins	Colorado	
2009–10	Jacob Pullen	Kansas State	Ekpe Udoh	Baylor	Tommy Mason-Griffin	Oklahoma	
2009–10	Donald Sloan	Texas A&M	N/A	N/A	N/A	N/A	
2010–11	Alec Burks	Colorado	Diante Garrett	Iowa State	Cory Higgins	Colorado	
2010–11	Marcus Denmon	Missouri	Perry Jones III	Baylor	Lance Jeter	Nebraska	
2010–11	LaceDarius Dunn	Baylor	Khris Middleton	Texas A&M	Gary Johnson	Texas	
2010–11	Jordan Hamilton	Texas	Markieff Morris	Kansas	David Loubeau	Texas A&M	
2010–11	Marcus Morris Sr.*	Kansas	Tristan Thompson	Texas	Rodney McGruder	Kansas State	
2010–11	Jacob Pullen	Kansas State	N/A	N/A	Marshall Moses	Oklahoma State	
2011–12	J’Covan Brown	Texas	Quincy Acy	Baylor	Scott Christopherson	Iowa State	
2011–12	Marcus Denmon	Missouri	Pierre Jackson	Baylor	Kim English	Missouri	
2011–12	Thomas Robinson*	Kansas	Rodney McGruder	Kansas State	Perry Jones III	Baylor	
2011–12	Tyshawn Taylor	Kansas	Keiton Page	Oklahoma State	Phil Pressey	Missouri	
2011–12	Royce White	Iowa State	Ricardo Ratliffe	Missouri	Jeff Withey	Kansas	
2012–13	Rodney McGruder	Kansas State	Markel Brown	Oklahoma State	Isaiah Austin	Baylor	
2012–13	Ben McLemore	Kansas	Will Clyburn	Iowa State	Melvin Ejim	Iowa State	
2012–13	Romero Osby	Oklahoma	Pierre Jackson	Baylor	Amath M’Baye	Oklahoma	
2012–13	Marcus Smart*	Oklahoma State	Travis Releford	Kansas	Le’Bryan Nash	Oklahoma State	
2012–13	Jeff Withey	Kansas	Ángel Rodríguez	Kansas State	Steven Pledger	Oklahoma	
2013–14	Melvin Ejim*	Iowa State	Markel Brown	Oklahoma State	Cameron Clark	Oklahoma	
2013–14	DeAndre Kane	Iowa State	Joel Embiid	Kansas	Jaye Crockett	Texas Tech	
2013–14	Marcus Smart	Oklahoma State	Marcus Foster	Kansas State	Perry Ellis	Kansas	
2013–14	Juwan Staten	West Virginia	Buddy Hield	Oklahoma	Cory Jefferson	Baylor	
2013–14	Andrew Wiggins	Kansas	Johnathan Holmes	Texas	Georges Niang	Iowa State	
2014–15	Perry Ellis	Kansas	Kenny Chery	Baylor	Phil Forte	Oklahoma State	
2014–15	Rico Gathers	Baylor	Frank Mason III	Kansas	Jameel McKay	Iowa State	
2014–15	Buddy Hield*	Oklahoma	Monté Morris	Iowa State	Isaiah Taylor	Texas	
2014–15	Georges Niang	Iowa State	Le’Bryan Nash	Oklahoma State	Shawn Thomas	Oklahoma	
2014–15	Juwan Staten	West Virginia	Taurean Prince	Baylor	Myles Turner	Texas	
2015–16	Perry Ellis	Kansas	Frank Mason III	Kansas	Isaiah Cousins	Oklahoma	
2015–16	Georges Niang	Iowa State	Monté Morris	Iowa State	Rico Gathers	Baylor	
2015–16	Taurean Prince	Baylor	Jaysean Paige	West Virginia	Wesley Iwundu	Kansas State	
2015–16	Buddy Hield*	Oklahoma	Wayne Selden Jr.	Kansas	Johnathan Motley	Baylor	
2015–16	Isaiah Taylor	Texas	Devin Williams	West Virginia	Ryan Spangler	Oklahoma	
2016–17	Jawun Evans	Oklahoma State	Vladimir Brodziansky	TCU	Nathan Adrian	West Virginia	
2016–17	Josh Jackson	Kansas	Jeffrey Carroll	Oklahoma State	Deonte Burton	Iowa State	
2016–17	Frank Mason III*	Kansas	Jevon Carter	West Virginia	Keenan Evans	Texas Tech	
2016–17	Monté Morris	Iowa State	Devonte’ Graham	Kansas	Wesley Iwundu	Kansas State	
2016–17	Johnathan Motley	Baylor	Nazareth Mitrou-Long	Iowa State	Manu Lecomte	Baylor	
2017–18	Jevon Carter	West Virginia	Mohamed Bamba	Texas	Jo Lual-Acuil	Baylor	
2017–18	Devonte’ Graham*	Kansas	Barry Brown Jr.	Kansas State	Udoka Azubuike	Kansas	
2017–18	Keenan Evans	Texas Tech	Manu Lecomte	Baylor	Vladimir Brodziansky	TCU	
2017–18	Dean Wade	Kansas State	Sviatoslav Mykhailiuk	Kansas	Jeffrey Carroll	Oklahoma State	
2017–18	Trae Young	Oklahoma	Kenrich Williams	TCU	Sagaba Konate	West Virginia	
2018–19	Barry Brown Jr.	Kansas State	Desmond Bane	TCU	Kristian Doolittle	Oklahoma	
2018–19	Jarrett Culver*	Texas Tech	Derek Culver	West Virginia	Devon Dotson	Kansas	
2018–19	Dedric Lawson	Kansas	Jaxson Hayes	Texas	Christian James	Oklahoma	
2018–19	Marial Shayok	Iowa State	Makai Mason	Baylor	Davide Moretti	Texas Tech	
2018–19	Dean Wade	Kansas State	Matt Mooney	Texas Tech	Alex Robinson	TCU	

=== 2020–present ===
Season	First team		Second team		Third team		Ref
Season	Players	Teams	Players	Teams	Players	Teams	Ref
2019–20	Udoka Azubuike*	Kansas	Freddie Gillespie	Baylor	Matt Coleman III	Texas	
2019–20	Desmond Bane	TCU	Tyrese Haliburton	Iowa State	Marcus Garrett	Kansas	
2019–20	Jared Butler	Baylor	Jahmi'us Ramsey	Texas Tech	Brady Manek	Oklahoma	
2019–20	Kristian Doolittle	Oklahoma	MaCio Teague	Baylor	Davion Mitchell	Baylor	
2019–20	Devon Dotson	Kansas	Oscar Tshiebwe	West Virginia	Mark Vital	Baylor	
2020–21	Jared Butler	Baylor	Marcus Garrett	Kansas	Rasir Bolton	Iowa State	
2020–21	Cade Cunningham*	Oklahoma State	Andrew Jones	Texas	Matt Coleman III	Texas	
2020–21	Derek Culver	West Virginia	Miles McBride	West Virginia	RJ Nembhard	TCU	
2020–21	Davion Mitchell	Baylor	David McCormack	Kansas	Courtney Ramey	Texas	
2020–21	Austin Reaves	Oklahoma	Mac McClung	Texas Tech	Terrence Shannon Jr.	Texas Tech	
2020–21	N/A	N/A	N/A	N/A	MaCio Teague	Baylor	
2021–22	Ochai Agbaji*	Kansas	Timmy Allen	Texas	Avery Anderson III	Oklahoma State	
2021–22	James Akinjo	Baylor	Christian Braun	Kansas	Marcus Carr	Texas	
2021–22	Izaiah Brockington	Iowa State	Adam Flagler	Baylor	David McCormack	Kansas	
2021–22	Nijel Pack	Kansas State	Mike Miles Jr.	TCU	Mark Smith	Kansas State	
2021–22	Bryson Williams	Texas Tech	Taz Sherman	West Virginia	Jalen Wilson	Kansas	
2022–23	Marcus Carr	Texas	Damion Baugh	TCU	Kalib Boone	Oklahoma State	
2022–23	Adam Flagler	Baylor	Gradey Dick	Kansas	LJ Cryer	Houston	
2022–23	Keyontae Johnson	Kansas State	Keyonte George	Baylor	Kevin McCullar Jr.	Kansas	
2022–23	Markquis Nowell	Kansas State	Gabe Kalscheur	Iowa State	Sir'Jabari Rice	Texas	
2022–23	Jalen Wilson*	Kansas	Mike Miles Jr.	TCU	Erik Stevenson	West Virginia	
2023–24	Hunter Dickinson	Kansas	LJ Cryer	Houston	Jalen Bridges	Baylor	
2023–24	Dylan Disu	Texas	RayJ Dennis	Baylor	Pop Isaacs	Texas Tech	
2023–24	Tamin Lipsey	Iowa State	Keshon Gilbert	Iowa State	J'Wan Roberts	Houston	
2023–24	Kevin McCullar Jr.	Kansas	Emanuel Miller	TCU	Darrion Williams	Texas Tech	
2023–24	Jamal Shead*	Houston	N/A	N/A	Ja'Kobe Walter	Baylor	

Season	First team				Second team		Third team		Ref
Season	Players	Teams	Players	Teams	Players	Teams	Players	Teams	Ref
2024–25	LJ Cryer	Houston	J'Wan Roberts	Houston	V. J. Edgecombe	Baylor	Keshon Gilbert	Iowa State	
2024–25	Hunter Dickinson	Kansas	Richie Saunders	BYU	Keyshawn Hall	UCF	Coleman Hawkins	Kansas State	
2024–25	Curtis Jones	Iowa State	Javon Small	West Virginia	Joshua Jefferson	Iowa State	Tamin Lipsey	Iowa State	
2024–25	Caleb Love	Arizona	JT Toppin*	Texas Tech	Chance McMillian	Texas Tech	Zeke Mayo	Kansas	
2024–25	Norchad Omier	Baylor	Darrion Williams	Texas Tech	Milos Uzan	Houston	Joseph Tugler	Houston	
2025–26	Christian Anderson Jr.	Texas Tech	Kingston Flemings	Houston	Richie Saunders	BYU	Koa Peat	Arizona	
2025–26	Flory Bidunga	Kansas	Joshua Jefferson	Iowa State	Baba Miller	Cincinnati	Cameron Carr	Baylor	
2025–26	Jaden Bradley*	Arizona	Motiejus Krivas	Arizona	Tamin Lipsey	Iowa State	Robert Wright III	BYU	
2025–26	Brayden Burries	Arizona	Emanuel Sharp	Houston	Milan Momcilovic	Iowa State	Themus Fulks	UCF	
2025–26	AJ Dybantsa	BYU	JT Toppin	Texas Tech	Darryn Peterson	Kansas	Xavier Edmonds	TCU	

== Selections per School ==
=== First Team ===
School	Total
Arizona	4
Arizona State	0
Baylor	12
BYU	2
Cincinnati	0
Colorado	5
Houston	5
Iowa State	15
Kansas	39
Kansas State	10
Oklahoma State	13
TCU	1
Texas Tech	15
UCF	0
Utah	0
West Virginia	5

=== Second Team ===
School	Total
Arizona	0
Arizona State	0
Baylor	18
BYU	1
Cincinnati	1
Colorado	3
Houston	2
Iowa State	17
Kansas	23
Kansas State	11
Oklahoma State	11
TCU	7
Texas Tech	9
UCF	1
Utah	0
West Virginia	7

=== Third Team ===
School	Total
Arizona	1
Arizona State	0
Baylor	18
BYU	1
Cincinnati	0
Colorado	6
Houston	2
Iowa State	17
Kansas	16
Kansas State	8
Oklahoma State	14
TCU	4
Texas Tech	8
UCF	1
Utah	0
West Virginia	8

=== Former Schools ===
==== First Team ====
School	Total
Missouri	6
Nebraska	3
Oklahoma	14
Texas	15
Texas A&M	2

=== Second Team ===
School	Total
Missouri	7
Nebraska	3
Oklahoma	6
Texas	19
Texas A&M	4

=== Third Team ===
School	Total
Missouri	9
Nebraska	5
Oklahoma	15
Texas	17
Texas A&M	7

|}
