= Brice Williams =

American basketball player (born 2001)

No. 3 – Motor City Cruise
- Position: Shooting guard / small forward
- League: NBA G League

Personal information
- Born: July 5, 2001 (age 25) Huntersville, North Carolina, U.S.
- Listed height: 6 ft 7 in (2.01 m)
- Listed weight: 214 lb (97 kg)

Career information
- High school: Hopewell (Huntersville, North Carolina)
- College: Charlotte (2019–2023); Nebraska (2023–2025)
- NBA draft: 2025: undrafted
- Playing career: 2025–present

Career history
- 2025–present: Motor City Cruise

Career highlights
- College Basketball Crown champion (2025); College Basketball Invitational champion (2023); First-team All-Big Ten (2025); Second-team All-CUSA (2023)
- Stats at NBA.com
- Stats at Basketball Reference

Brice Williams (born July 5, 2001) is an American professional basketball player for the Motor City Cruise of the NBA G League. Williams played college basketball for the Nebraska Cornhuskers and Charlotte 49ers.

== Early life and high school ==
Coming out of high school, Williams committed to play college basketball for the Charlotte 49ers over other schools such as Bucknell, Charlotte, George Mason, Lafayette, St. Bonaventure and Wake Forest.

== College career ==
=== Charlotte ===
As a freshman in 2019-20, Williams played 27 games where he averaged 2.3 points and 1.5 rebounds per game. He missed the entirety of the 2021-22 season due to a knee injury. In 2020-21, Williams played in 25 games with 14 starts, where he averaged 9.7 points, 4.0 rebounds, and 1.0 assist per game. On December 29, 2022, he recorded 31 points in a win over Middle Tennessee State. During the 2022-23 season, Williams averaged 13.8 points and 5.3 rebounds per game and was named the 2023 CBI MVP. After the season, he entered his name into the NCAA transfer portal.

=== Nebraska ===
Williams transferred to play for the Nebraska Cornhuskers. In his first season with the Cornhuskers in 2023-24 he started all 34 games and averaged 13.4 points, 5.5 rebounds, and 2.5 assists per game. On December 13, 2024, Williams notched 30 points, six rebounds, and five assists in a win over Indiana. On December 23, he totaled 32 points, two rebounds, three assists and two steals in a victory over Hawaii. On December 25, Williams recorded 25 points, seven rebounds and four assists in a win over Oregon State. He was named the Big Ten player of the week after averaging 27.5 points, 7.5 rebounds, and five assists in win over Illinois on January 30, 2025, and Oregon on February 2. On February 19, Williams scored 17 points against Penn State. On February 24, he scored 26 of Nebraska's 49 points in a loss to Michigan. On March 4, Williams dropped a career-high and single-game school record 43 points in a double overtime loss to Ohio State. Williams led Nebraska to winning the 2025 College Basketball Crown, leading the tournament with 93 points and setting Nebraska's single–season school record for points at 713, surpassing James Palmer Jr.'s record of 708 points set in the 2018–19 season.

== Professional career ==
Williams went undrafted in the 2025 NBA draft. He then signed a training camp deal with the Detroit Pistons.

== Personal life ==
Williams is the son of former NBA player Henry Williams.
