= Andre Smith (basketball, born 1958) =

American basketball player (c. 1958 – 2023)

Personal information
- Born: July 24, 1958 Chicago, Illinois, U.S.
- Died: March 4, 2023 (aged 64)
- Listed height: 6 ft 7 in (2.01 m)
- Listed weight: 205 lb (93 kg)

Career information
- High school: Kennedy (Chicago, Illinois)
- College: Nebraska (1977–1981)
- NBA draft: 1981: 7th round, 142nd overall pick
- Drafted by: Cleveland Cavaliers
- Position: Center / power forward

Career highlights
- Big Eight Player of the Year (1981); 2× First-team All-Big Eight (1980, 1981)
- Stats at Basketball Reference

Andre Smith (July 24, 1958 – March 4, 2023) was an American college basketball player for the Nebraska Cornhuskers in the late 1970s and early 1980s.

A native of Chicago, Illinois, Smith played at the University of Nebraska–Lincoln as an undersized center at 6'7". Between 1977–78 and 1980–81, Smith scored 1,717 points in 114 games for a career average of 15.1 points per game. At the time of his graduation, he was second on the all-time Cornhuskers scoring list. Smith is still found in the top 10 on many other school records. During his junior and senior years he was named a First Team All-Big 8 Conference member, and at the conclusion of his final season was named the Big 8 Conference Men's Basketball Player of the Year. In 1980–81, Smith averaged 18.3 points per game to lead the conference en route to becoming Nebraska's first-ever player of the year recipient. He earned honorable mention from the Associated Press in its voting for All-Americans. The Cleveland Cavaliers selected Smith in the 1981 NBA draft, although he never played in the league.

Smith died in March 2023, at the age of 64.

== Sources ==
1. "1981 NBA Draft". basketball-reference.com. Sports Reference LLC.
2. "Smith Named Big 8 Player of the Year". The Daily Union. March 11, 1981.
3. "Nebraska Basketball Honor Roll". Huskers.com. University of Nebraska. November 22, 2006. Archived from the original on January 26, 2011.
4. "History of Nebraska Men's Basketball". college-basketball-tickets.net. Archived from the original on 2012-04-26.
