= Cookie Belcher =

American basketball player (born 1978)

Personal information
- Born: June 25, 1978 (age 48) Mexico, Missouri
- Listed height: 6 ft 4 in (1.93 m)
- Listed weight: 205 lb (93 kg)

Career information
- High school: Mexico (Mexico, Missouri)
- College: Nebraska (1996–2001)
- NBA draft: 2001: undrafted
- Position: Guard

Career history
- 2001–2005: Laurentana Biella
- 2005–2010: Bnei HaSharon
- 2010–2011: Maroussi B.C.

Segado Cortez "Cookie" Belcher (born June 25, 1978) is an American basketball player. He played for the Nebraska Cornhuskers from 1996 to 2001 and set several school records. Since 2012, he is a coach in IMG Academy.

== Early life ==
Belcher was born on June 25, 1978, in Mexico, Missouri. He went to Saint Brendan's Catholic School. He played basketball for the school in fifth grade through eighth grade. He played on the basketball team at Mexico High School. Belcher is a second-degree cousin of former NBA player current coach Tyronn Lue who also grew up in Mexico, Missouri.

== College career ==
Belcher played for Nebraska from 1996 to 2001. In his freshman season, 1996–97, he averaged 9.2 points per game. He was the only Husker player to start all 33 games that year. He led the Big 12 Conference in steals per game, with 2.6, and his 87 total steals was a new Nebraska freshman record. The following season, Belcher started all 32 games and averaged 11.1 points. He led the team in steals, with 75, and was named to the Big 12 All-Defensive team.

In 1998–99, Belcher averaged 11.8 points per game. He also averaged 3.2 steals per game to lead the Big 12, and his 102 steals was a new NU and Big 12 season record. In 1999–2000, Belcher injured his wrist early in the season, receiving a medical redshirt. He played in only four games during the season.

The following year, as a senior, Belcher led Nebraska with 16.4 points per game and 82 steals. He was also named to the Big 12 All-Defensive team. He finished his college career with 353 steals, which was the most in Nebraska and Big 12 Conference history. In addition, he set school records for most career minutes played (4095), games played (131), and starts (129). He ranked second in career assists (477).

== Professional career ==
Belcher was not selected in the 2001 NBA draft. He played for Italy's Lauretana Biella from 2001 to 2005, and for Israeli Bnei Herzliya from 2005 to 2010, before moving to Greek Maroussi B.C. (where he cooperated with his Israeli team partner for the last 5 years, Ousmane Cisse) and retiring after a year, finishing a decade of professional career.

== Coaching career ==
In 2012, he joined IMG Academy.

== See also ==
- List of NCAA Division I men's basketball career steals leaders
