= Nebraska Cornhuskers men's basketball =

University of Nebraska–Lincoln men's basketball team

| 2026–27 Nebraska Cornhuskers men's basketball team |
- University: University of Nebraska–Lincoln
- First season: 1896–97; 130 years ago
- Athletic director: Troy Dannen
- Head coach: Fred Hoiberg; 8th season, 117–115 (.504)
- Location: Lincoln, Nebraska
- Arena: Pinnacle Bank Arena (capacity: 15,000)
- NCAA division: Division I
- Conference: Big Ten
- Nickname: Cornhuskers
- Colors: Scarlet and cream
- Student section: Red Zone
- All-time record: 1,626–1,478 (.524)
- NCAA tournament record: 2–9 (.182)

NCAA Division I tournament Sweet Sixteen
- 2026

NCAA Division I tournament appearances
- 1986, 1991, 1992, 1993, 1994, 1998, 2014, 2024, 2026

NIT champions
- 1996

Conference tournament champions
- Big Eight: 1994

Conference regular-season champions
- MVIAA: 1912, 1913, 1914, 1916 Big Eight: 1937, 1949, 1950

Conference division champions
- MVIAA North: 1908, 1909, 1910, 1912, 1913, 1914

College Basketball Crown champion
- 2025

Uniforms
| Home | Away | Alternate |

The Nebraska Cornhuskers men's basketball team competes as part of NCAA Division I, representing the University of Nebraska–Lincoln in the Big Ten Conference. Since it was founded in 1897, the program has appeared in eight NCAA Division I tournaments and twenty other national postseason tournaments. Nebraska has played its home games at Pinnacle Bank Arena since 2013.

Prior to the creation of the NCAA tournament, Nebraska was a Midwest power under head coaches Raymond G. Clapp and Ewald O. Stiehm. NU struggled through the post-World War II years, which included a stretch of twenty-eight years with just two winning seasons that stretched into the 1960s. Much of the team's modest modern-day success came during the fourteen-year tenure of Danny Nee, Nebraska's winningest head coach. Nee led the Cornhuskers to five of their nine NCAA Division I tournament appearances and won the 1996 NIT championship. Nebraska has reached the NCAA tournament just four times since Nee was fired in 2000, but won a second postseason title in 2025, the inaugural College Basketball Crown. Nebraska was the last major-conference school to win an NCAA tournament game, accomplished in 2026.

The team has been coached by Fred Hoiberg since 2019.

== History ==
=== Early years ===
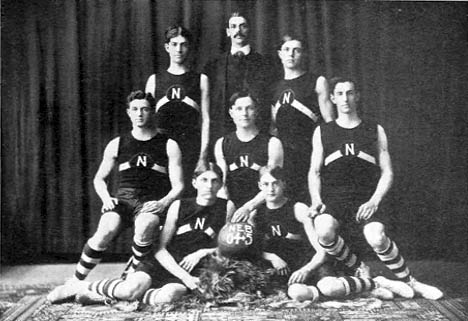
1904–05 Nebraska Cornhuskers basketball team

The University of Nebraska's basketball history began on February 2, 1897, six years after the invention of the sport by James Naismith. The Nebraska "Bugeaters" defeated a team from the Lincoln YMCA 11–8 at Grant Memorial Hall, which was located on the site of the current Sheldon Museum of Art and served as NU's primary home venue until the NU Coliseum opened in 1926. Nebraska began playing other universities in 1898–99, defeating Nebraska Wesleyan and Doane, and faced an out-of-state opponent for the first time the following season, beating Naismith and Kansas 48–8 in what is still the worst loss in KU history. NU's 1899–00 team finished 5–0 and was retroactively ranked second nationally by the Premo-Porretta Power Poll.

Multi-sport coach Raymond G. Clapp took over the basketball program in 1903 and led NU into the Missouri Valley Intercollegiate Athletic Association after playing its first eleven seasons as an independent. In its early years, the MVIAA divided teams into North and South divisions – Nebraska won six of seven North division championships, the first two under Clapp. During this stretch, Wilbur Wood became the second black player at a predominantly white university in men's college basketball history.

In 1911, fiery football coach Ewald O. Stiehm became the school's first full-time basketball coach. Stiehm – nicknamed "Jumbo" because of his large feet – won fourteen of fifteen games in his first season; The Daily Nebraskan blamed the only loss on Nebraska's inability to adjust to Minnesota's larger court. Under Stiehm and his high-pace offensive scheme, Nebraska won or shared the MVIAA championship in 1912, 1913, and 1914, and guard Sam Carrier became Nebraska's only first-team All-America selection. Stiehm had verbally agreed to remain at Nebraska until at least 1917, but given the successes of the entire athletic department, asked the Athletic Board for a raise in 1916. The board refused and declined an offer from local businesses to help pay the additional salary, and Stiehm agreed to take over Indiana's athletic department at an annual salary of $4,500.

Stiehm's abrupt departure meant the university was forced to turn to graduate student Samuel C. Waugh, who led NU to a 13–1 finish and a fourth MVIAA title in his lone season as head coach. In 1916, football coach E. J. Stewart was asked to lead the basketball program as well. Stewart advocated scheduling difficult opposition across all sports as the best way to "add to Nebraska prestige around the United States." NU's run of conference success ended under Stewart, who left the university after an abbreviated 1917–18 season to assist the YMCA during World War I. He returned and coached one more season before departing permanently. Football assistant Paul J. Schissler succeeded Stewart and immediately led NU to a twenty-two-win season, a school record that stood until 1991. Nebraska declined an invited to the postseason AAU tournament in Atlanta. Schissler resigned to become head football coach at Lombard College following the 1920–21 season, later coaching the National Football League's Chicago Cardinals and Brooklyn Dodgers and helping create the league's Pro Bowl.

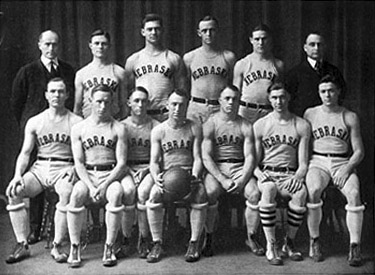
The 1921–22 Nebraska Cornhuskers basketball team

Nebraska played its 1921 and 1922 home games at the State Fairgrounds Coliseum while Grant Hall was being remodeled. The Fairgrounds Coliseum had a larger court and higher seating capacity than Grant Hall. After two seasons, NU returned to Grant Hall and played there until 1926, when construction on the $445,000 NU Coliseum was finished. The Coliseum's seating capacity of 8,000 nearly quadrupled that of Grant Hall. The Cornhuskers lost 25–14 to Kansas in the first game at their new home on February 6, 1926.

After ending the decade with an 11–5 season under former Kansas All-American Charles T. Black, Nebraska had just two winning seasons over the following nineteen years, one of which was a Big Six championship in 1937. The 1930s produced four more Cornhusker All-Americans: Don Maclay in 1931, Steve Hokuf in 1933, George Wahlquist in 1936, and Robert Parsons in 1937. Maclay was the Big Six's scoring leader in 1930, scoring 112 points in ten league games.

=== Harry Good (1946–1954) ===
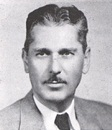
Harry Good

Harry Good was hired as head coach in 1946, and after two losing seasons he turned Nebraska's fortunes around. In 1948–49, Good's Huskers went 16–10, tied Oklahoma for the Big Seven championship and defeated the Sooners in a conference playoff to qualify for an NCAA berth. The Cornhuskers lost 52–35 to MVC champion Oklahoma A&M 52–35, which finished runner-up to Adolph Rupp's Kentucky Wildcats. In 1949–50, Nebraska again won sixteen games and shared the Big Seven title with Kansas and Kansas State, NU's most recent regular season conference championship. Claude Retherford and Bus Whitehead were named all-conference performers in 1949, and Whitehead earned the honor again the next year. The 6-ft 11-in. Whitehead averaged a then-school-record 15.7 points per game in 1950 and was the first Cornhusker selected to play in the East-West All-Star Game at Madison Square Garden. When he graduated, Whitehead held nine school scoring records. This period of relative prosperity was followed with fifteen consecutive losing seasons. Despite playing for a team that finished last in the Big Seven, Husker guard Jim Buchanan earned All-America and all-conference honors in 1952.

=== Jerry Bush (1954–1963) ===
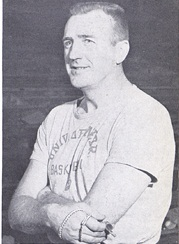
Jerry Bush

Jerry Bush, dubbed the "Big Bear of the Coliseum," never produced a winning team in his nine seasons at Nebraska, and never finished higher than fourth in conference play. Nevertheless, his colorful personality and uncanny ability to fashion upsets kept Cornhuskers fans entertained. The most dramatic of these upsets came against No. 4 Kansas in 1958. The Jayhawks defeated the Cornhuskers 102–46 earlier in the year, with star center Wilt Chamberlain single-handedly matching Nebraska's forty-six points. In the rematch, guard Jim Kubacki hit a jump shot with two seconds remaining to give Nebraska a 43–41 win. Kubacki started the game out with a knee injury, but when team captain Gary Reimers hurt his leg with seven minutes remaining, Kubacki convinced Bush to let him suit up.

Bush coached the school's first 1,000-point scorer, Indianapolis native Herschell Turner, who was rated the second-best high school player in the state as a senior, behind only Oscar Robertson. Turner earned All-America honors in 1959 and followed with All-Big Eight honors in 1960 and ended his collegiate career with 1,056 points.

=== Joe Cipriano (1963–1980) ===
In March 1963, Bush was replaced as head coach by thirty-one-year-old Joe Cipriano. Nebraska athletic director Tippy Dye had coached Cipriano at Washington, where they led the Huskies to the 1953 Final Four and a 79–15 record during the energetic Cipriano's varsity career. Following graduation, he served as an assistant coach at his alma mater until he was hired by Idaho in 1960. His Vandals improved in each of his three seasons and posted a 20–6 record in 1962–63, led by future Basketball Hall of Famer Gus Johnson. "Slippery Joe" brought an up-tempo style of basketball to the Coliseum; his Nebraska teams ran a full-court press and fast-break offense, which led the Big Eight in scoring average in 1966, 1967, and 1968.

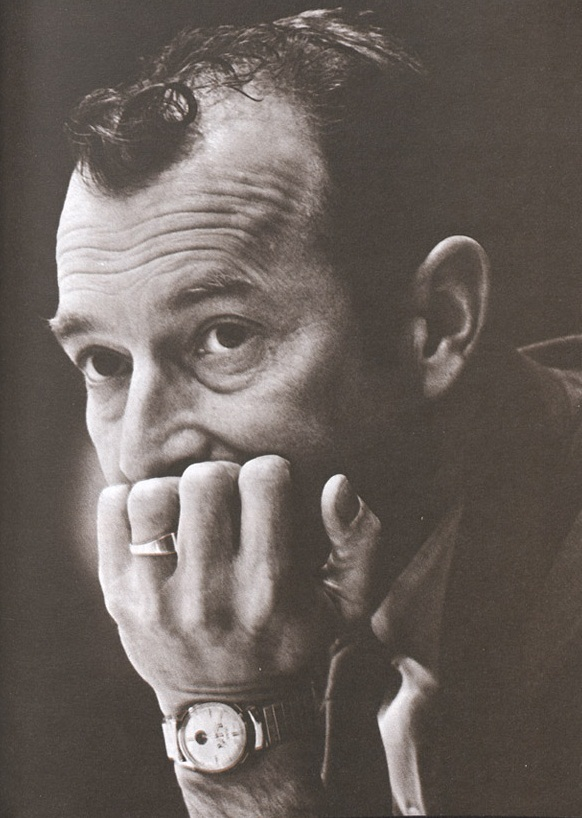
Joe Cipriano

Cipriano's first two teams struggled to a combined record of 17–33. But his third team, in 1965–66, was one of the most successful in school history, finishing 20–5 and second to Kansas in the Big Eight. However, that was not enough to garner a postseason bid, as only the conference champion was guaranteed a berth in the twenty-two-team NCAA tournament.

The 1966–67 team finished 16–9 and made the school's first postseason appearance, in the fourteen-team NIT at Madison Square Garden. Guard Stu Lantz, a two-time All-Big Eight selection, led the Cornhuskers in scoring and rebounding in both 1966–67 and 1967–68. Guard Marvin Stewart and center Chuck Jura earned All-Big Eight honors in 1971 and 1972, respectively. Guard Jerry Fort, who finished his career with a then-school record 1,882 points, was the first Nebraska player chosen first-team all-conference three times. Led by Cipriano and Fort, Nebraska began a string of fourteen consecutive winning seasons.

In the fall of 1976, NU basketball moved out of the Coliseum and into the state-of the-art NU Sports Complex (now the Bob Devaney Sports Center), located on the State Fairgrounds. The $13 million athletic complex was financed by a special cigarette tax.

Cipriano coached Nebraska to another twenty-victory season in 1977–78. The Cornhuskers, led by All-Big Eight guard Brian Banks, finished 22–8 and advanced to the second round of the NIT. By the 1979–80 season, Cipriano's failing health – he would die of cancer in November 1980 – meant he had to share coaching duties with assistant Moe Iba, and they took Nebraska to the NIT again. The duo were named co-recipients of Big Eight Coach of the Year.

Cipriano brought Nebraska into the modern era, coaching seventeen seasons and 450 games. His record of 253–197 gave him nearly one-fifth of Nebraska's all-time wins, and 168 more than any previous NU head coach.

=== Moe Iba (1980–1986) ===
Iba was named head coach following Cipriano's death in November 1980. In Iba's six seasons, Nebraska was 106–71 and advanced to postseason play four times.

Center Andre Smith was the 1981 Big Eight Player of the Year and twice earned all-conference honors. However, it was Jack Moore, a 5-ft 10-in. playmaker from Muncie, Indiana, who captured the hearts of Nebraska fans in the early 1980s. Moore earned All-Big Eight honors in 1982, when he won the Frances Pomeroy Naismith Award as the nation's top player six feet tall or shorter. Moore scored 1,204 points, shot .901 from the free throw line during his career, and was NU's first three-time academic All-Big Eight selection.

The cornerstone of Iba's teams from 1983 through 1986 was Omaha native Dave Hoppen, a three-time All-Big Eight center and the first Nebraska basketball player to have his jersey number (No. 42) retired by the school. In 1982–83, Hoppen's freshman season, the Cornhuskers went 22–10 and won three games in the NIT before losing to DePaul in the semifinals. The Cornhuskers returned to the NIT each of the next two seasons, advancing to the second round both times.

Hoppen's college career was ended by a knee injury he sustained against Colorado on February 1, 1986. He finished as the school's all-time scoring leader with 2,167 points and broke or tied nineteen school records. Despite Hoppen's injury, Iba's team earned the school's first NCAA Tournament berth, where they lost to Western Kentucky 67–59 in the first round of the Southeast Regional. Before the tournament began, Iba became aware athletic director Bob Devaney was reaching out to coaches across to gauge their interest in Nebraska's coaching position. He resigned following the game.

=== Danny Nee (1986–2000) ===
On March 27, 1986, Danny Nee was introduced as Nebraska's twenty-fourth basketball coach. During his introductory press conference, Nee said a "new era" in NU basketball was beginning. Nee's fourteen teams appeared in the postseason eleven times and topped the twenty-win mark in seven seasons. In his first season, Nebraska was 21–12 and finished third in the NIT. Nebraska missed postseason play in each of the following three seasons, but won a school-record twenty-six games in 1990–91. The Cornhuskers reached the Big Eight Tournament championship game for the first time and advanced to the NCAA Tournament, where they were upset by No. 14 seed Xavier in the first round. The 1990–91 team included two future first-round NBA draft picks, senior Rich King and redshirt freshman Eric Piatkowski. The 7-ft 2-in. King was the tallest player in program history. Piatkowski, Nebraska's sixth man in 1990–91, went on to earn first-team all-conference honors twice. He ranks second on the Cornhuskers' career scoring list with 1,934 points and is the only Nebraska player to finish with at least 1,900 points, 600 rebounds (669) and 300 assists (322). In 2006, Piatkowski (No. 52) joined Hoppen and Stu Lantz (No. 22) as the only players to have their number retired.

Three more NCAA Tournament appearances followed the record-breaking 1991 season. In 1992–93, the Huskers tied for second place in the Big Eight, their highest league finish under Nee. In addition to reaching a fourth consecutive NCAA Tournament and recording back-to-back twenty-win seasons for the first time in school history, Nee's 1993–94 team won the school's first conference tournament title. The Cornhuskers defeated Oklahoma, Missouri, and Oklahoma State to win the Big Eight Tournament.

Nebraska's NCAA Tournament run ended at four in 1994–95, but the Cornhuskers kept their postseason streak alive with an NIT berth, advancing to the second round. The 1995–96 team again failed to reach the NCAA Tournament, but capped its season with a run to the NIT title. NU won two games on the road and scored more than eighty points in four of their five postseason games, finishing with a 60–56 victory over St. Joseph's. The 1996 NIT championship team was one of the most talented in school history. Two future NBA players, Erick Strickland and 1998 first-round draft pick Tyronn Lue, started in the backcourt. Two others scored 1,000 career points, Jaron Boone and freshman Venson Hamilton, who finished his career in 1999 as the school's all-time leading rebounder and shot-blocker. Lue, a six-foot point guard, finished his career as the seventh-leading scorer in school history, and ranked in the top ten in twelve other categories. He led the Cornhuskers to the 1997 NIT in Nebraska's first season in the Big 12 Conference.

Behind Nebraska's longest conference winning streak in twenty years, Nee's twelfth team at NU finished fourth in the Big 12 and returned to the NCAA Tournament. The bid was the Cornhuskers' fifth during the 1990s and extended a school-record postseason streak to eight years. The streak reached nine in 1999 when Big 12 Player of the Year Venson Hamilton led the Cornhuskers to the second round of the NIT. The 1999–2000 season quickly fell apart when guard Cookie Belcher was sidelined by a wrist injury; the team finished 11–19 and tied the school record for losses in a season. Nee was fired just days after a 69–64 win over Colorado made him the winningest coach in school history.

=== Barry Collier (2000–2006) ===
Director of Athletics Bill Byrne hired Barry Collier as the Cornhuskers' new coach on April 5, 2000. In Collier's first season, Nebraska finished 14–16 as Belcher returned to the lineup and earned second-team All-Big 12 honors. He finished his career with 353 steals, the third-most in NCAA history. In Collier's fourth season, Nebraska finished 18–13 and earned its first postseason bid in five years. Nebraska won its first two games in the 2004 NIT, including a thrilling 71–70 road victory over in-state rival Creighton in the opening round. NU nearly overcame a seventeen-point halftime deficit in the third round, but lost to Hawaii by one point.

Despite a lackluster season for the program, freshman center Aleks Marić, the first Australian to play in the program, broke the NU freshman record for rebounds and double-doubles. He finished his four-year career fifth all-time in scoring and was only the second Husker to record 1,000 career rebounds. NU rebounded to finish 19–14 and make its second postseason appearance in three years in 2006, the program's most wins under Collier and the first time his Huskers won a Big 12 Tournament game. NU reached the semifinals of the conference tournament for the first time since winning the Big Eight Tournament in 1994. Collier abruptly resigned in August 2006 to become the athletic director at his alma mater Butler, ending his career at Nebraska with an 89–91 record.

=== Doc Sadler (2006–2012) ===
The late job opening created by Collier's abrupt resignation was filled in just one week, when Doc Sadler was introduced as the twenty-sixth head coach in program history. Sadler's program saw limited success through his six seasons in Lincoln, finishing above .500 four times but winning only one postseason game and failing to reach the NCAA Tournament.

Nebraska led the Big 12 in scoring defense in Sadler's second season, allowing just 60.7 points per game. NU led the Big 12 again the following season and ranked just outside the top twenty nationally at 60.4 points against per game, the second-lowest total for NU since 1951. This allowed NU to reach .500 in conference play for the first time in ten seasons. Despite typically lackluster offensive performances, Sadler's strong defenses earned him eighty-nine victories through his first five seasons in Lincoln, the highest total in school history. He was the second NU coach to reach the postseason twice in his first three seasons and the second since World War II with three winning seasons in his first four years. Led by another strong defensive unit that ranked seventh nationally in field goal percentage against (.389), NU defeated three ranked teams during the 2010–11 season, reaching the NIT to mark the school's third postseason appearance in four seasons under Sadler.

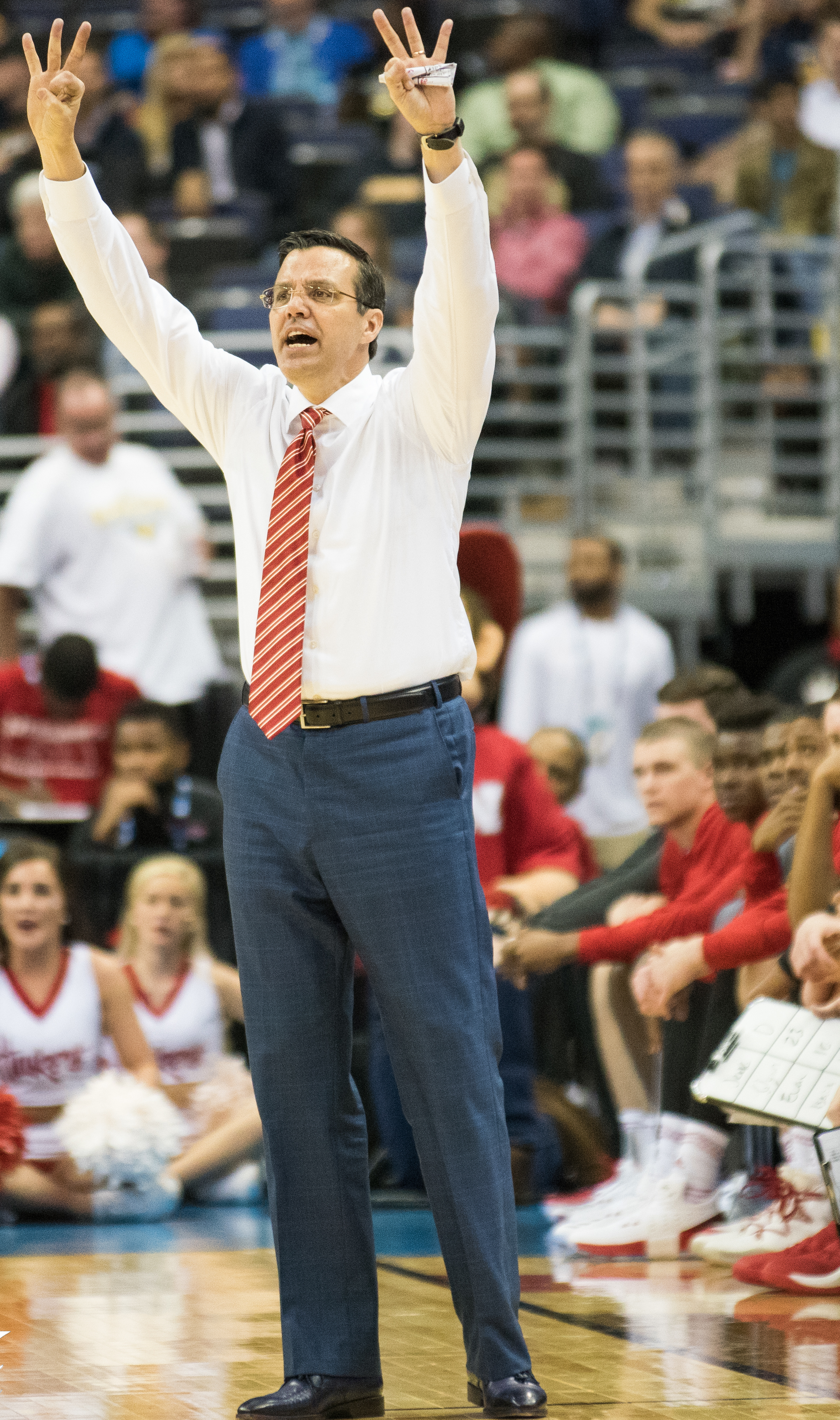
Tim Miles

The University of Nebraska–Lincoln joined the Big Ten Conference in 2011 and later that year the school opened the Hendricks Training Complex, a basketball training and practice facility attached to the Devaney Center. After a disappointing 12–18 season in 2011–12, athletic director Tom Osborne fired Sadler after six seasons. At the press conference to address his firing, an emotional Sadler addressed the media: "I wanted to be the guy that won the first NCAA Tournament game. It didn’t happen. That's the bottom line. We can all sit here and talk about this that whatever. It all comes down to winning. That's what it should come down to."

=== Tim Miles (2012–2019) ===
Tim Miles was hired as Nebraska's head basketball coach on March 24, 2012 after a five-year stint at Colorado State. In his second season, the Cornhuskers moved to Pinnacle Bank Arena after thirty-seven years at the Devaney Center. Their first game in the new arena was an exhibition game against Nebraska-Kearney on November 4, 2013, followed four days later by their first regular season game against Florida Gulf Coast. Behind a 15–1 record at "The Vault," Miles led the Cornhuskers to the program's first NCAA Tournament berth since 1998, but NU lost to Baylor in the first round. Despite appearing in the preseason AP Poll for the first time in twenty years, Nebraska finished under .500 in 2014–15 and did not have a winning record again until 2017–18. On February 6, 2017, Nebraska suffered their worst home defeat in program history, closing the regular season with a thirty-six-point loss to Michigan. After two NIT appearances in the following seasons, Miles was fired on March 26, 2019.

=== Fred Hoiberg (2019–present) ===
On March 30, 2019, the University of Nebraska announced that Fred Hoiberg had been hired as its head coach. NU lost at least twenty games in each of Hoiberg's first three seasons, the first such seasons in program history. The 2022–23 season looked to be the same until the Huskers won 5 of their 7 final games to finish 16–16. The positive momentum carried into the 2023–24 season where NU finished 3rd in the Big Ten and earned an 8 seed in the NCAA Tournament. A first-round loss to Texas A&M ended the season, but the team still finished with the second-best record in program history at 23–11.

The Cornhuskers won the first NCAA men's tournament game in the program's history on March 19, 2026, with a 76–47 victory over the Troy Trojans. The Cornhuskers proceeded to defeat Vanderbilt 74-72 in the round of 32 to advance the program’s first ever trip to the Sweet Sixteen.

Hoiberg has produced 2 current NBA players in his tenure at Nebraska, Dalano Banton and Bryce McGowens.

== Conference affiliations ==
- Independent (1896–1907, 1919–1920)
- Missouri Valley Intercollegiate Athletic Association / Big Eight Conference (1907–1919, 1920–1996) (Note: In 1928, the ten member schools of the Missouri Valley Intercollegiate Athletic Association agreed to a splintering of the conference – Iowa State, Kansas, Kansas State, Missouri, Nebraska, and Oklahoma retained the MVIAA name and Drake, Grinnell, Oklahoma A&M (now Oklahoma State), and Washington University formed the Missouri Valley Conference. The MVIAA became commonly known as the Big Six, and later the Big Seven and Big Eight. Its name was officially changed to the Big Eight in 1964.)
- Big 12 Conference (1996–2011)
- Big Ten Conference (2011–present)

== Coaches ==
=== Coaching Staff ===
| Coach | Position | First Year | Alma Mater |
|---|---|---|---|
| Fred Hoiberg | Head coach | 2019 | Iowa State |
| Nate Loenser | Associate head coach | 2021 | Iowa State |
| Padyn Borders | Assistant coach | 2025 | Nebraska |
| Pat Monaghan | Assistant coach | 2025 | Wyoming |
| Emmanuel Tommy | Assistant coach | 2026 | Western Michigan |
| Ernie Zeigler | Assistant coach | 2022 | Cleary |

== Rivalries ==
Nebraska and Creighton first met March 3, 1923, a 46–24 Bluejays win in Omaha. The schools, located fifty miles apart, played infrequently until beginning an annual series in 1977. Nebraska won sixteen of twenty matchups throughout the 1980s and 1990s, but Dana Altman and successor Greg McDermott revived the Bluejays program and took control of the series. NU has won both postseason meetings, in the 1984 and 2004 NIT. Creighton leads the series 30–29.

Since Creighton has not had a football program since 1942, a number of CU basketball fans also support Nebraska's football team. These are often derisively referred to as "Jayskers," a portmanteau of "Bluejays" and "Cornhuskers."

== Venues ==
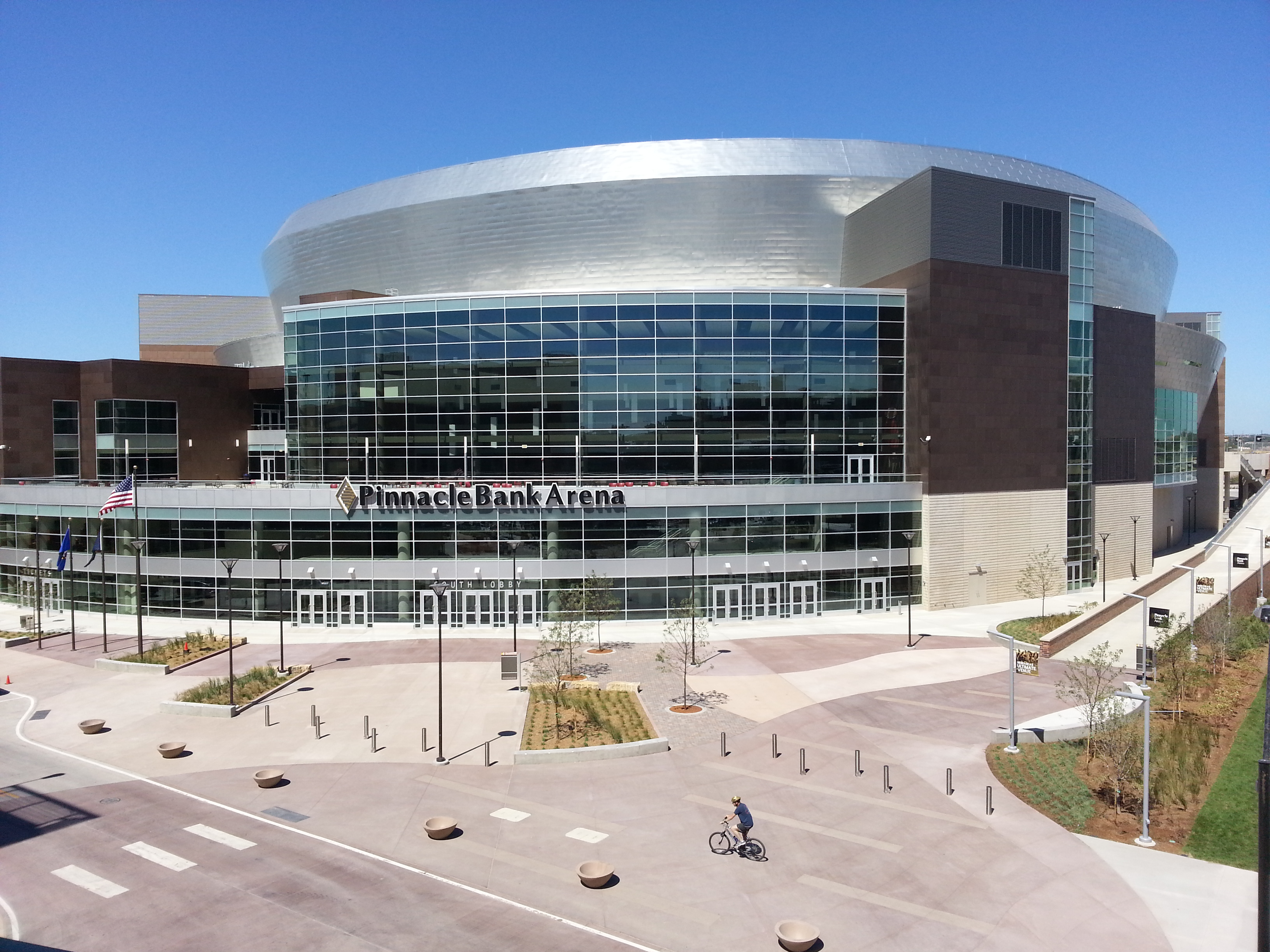
Nebraska has played at Pinnacle Bank Arena since 2013

=== NU Coliseum ===
Nebraska spent its earliest seasons at Grant Memorial Hall, a converted armory built in 1887. Aside from two years at the Fairgrounds Coliseum while Grant Hall was being renovated, NU played at the venue until 1926.

The university broke ground on the NU Coliseum in 1924, adjacent to the recently completed Memorial Stadium. Initially intended to be a part of the stadium complex, the Coliseum was funded as a standalone project using gate receipts from 1923 football games. It was designed by architects Ellery L. Davis and Walter Wilson, both university alumni who had worked on several buildings around NU's campus, including Memorial Stadium. Upon its completion in 1926, the Coliseum hosted most of the university's indoor athletic events.

The first event at the arena was a 25–14 men's basketball loss to Kansas on February 6, 1926. The program was generally unsuccessful in its fifty years playing at the Coliseum, though a nine-day stretch in 1958 featured two of the most memorable games in school history, wins over Wilt Chamberlain-led Kansas and top-ranked Kansas State at the Coliseum.

=== Bob Devaney Sports Center ===
Nebraska opened the 13,595-seat NU Sports Complex in 1976, a $13-million project financed by a local cigarette tax, and moved both its men's and women's basketball teams to the arena. It was renamed in honor of College Football Hall of Fame head coach Bob Devaney two years later and played home to Nebraska basketball for nearly four decades.

Nebraska played its most successful years in program history at the Devaney Center under Danny Nee in the early 1990s. Nee took NU to four consecutive NCAA Division I tournaments, upsetting several highly-ranked teams at the Devaney Center during his tenure. The Cornhuskers never had a losing season at the arena, compiling an overall record of 477–148. Nebraska moved to Pinnacle Bank Arena in 2013 but still practices at the Hendricks Training Complex at the Devaney Center.

=== Pinnacle Bank Arena ===
Nebraska moved to West Haymarket Arena (known as Pinnacle Bank Arena for sponsorship purposes) in 2013. Construction of the $181-million venue in Lincoln's Haymarket District was funded primarily through an occupation tax on restaurants, bars and hotels. It has a listed capacity of 15,000 for men's basketball games, making it the second-largest arena in the state of Nebraska and fifth-largest in the Big Ten Conference.

NU went 15–1 in its inaugural season at what became known as "The Vault," including a late-season victory over Wisconsin that propelled the program to its first NCAA Division I tournament since 1998. Ten years later, Nebraska defeated No. 1 Purdue at Pinnacle Bank Arena, its first victory over the country's top-ranked team in forty-two years. The program has ranked in the national top twenty-five in attendance each year it has played at the arena.

== Championships and awards ==
=== Conference championships ===
Regular season

- MVIAA / Big Eight: 1912, 1913, 1914, 1916, 1937, 1949, 1950

Tournament

- Big Eight: 1994

=== Individual awards ===
- AP College Basketball Coach of the Year: Fred Hoiberg (2025–26)
- Jim Phelan Award: Tim Miles (2014), Fred Hoiberg (2024)
- Conference player of the year: Andre Smith (1981), Venson Hamilton (1999)
- Conference freshman of the year: Erick Strickland (1993)
- Conference coach of the year: Joe Cipriano (1966, 1978, 1980), Moe Iba (1981), Danny Nee (1991), Tim Miles (2014), Fred Hoiberg (2024, 2026)

=== First-team All-Americans ===
- Sam Carrier – 1912–13

=== Retired numbers ===
| No. | Player | Position | Tenure | Retired (Note: The year the player's jersey or number was retired by the university.) |
|---|---|---|---|---|
| 10 | Tyronn Lue | PG | 1995–1998 | 2017 |
| 22 | Stu Lantz | G | 1965–1968 | 1989 |
| 42 | Dave Hoppen | C, PF | 1982–1986 | 1986 |
| 52 | Eric Piatkowski | SF | 1990–1994 | 2006 |

== Postseason results ==
=== NCAA Division I tournament ===
Nebraska has appeared in nine NCAA Division I tournaments with a record of 2–9. Until 2026, Nebraska was the last power conference school to never have won an NCAA tournament game.

| Year | Seed | Round | Opponent | Result |
|---|---|---|---|---|
| 1986 | 9 | First round | (8) Western Kentucky | L 59–67 |
| 1991 | 3 | First round | (14) Xavier | L 84–89 |
| 1992 | 8 | First round | (9) Connecticut | L 65–86 |
| 1993 | 10 | First round | (7) New Mexico State | L 79–93 |
| 1994 | 6 | First round | (11) Penn | L 80–90 |
| 1998 | 11 | First round | (6) Arkansas | L 65–74 |
| 2014 | 11 | First round | (6) Baylor | L 60–74 |
| 2024 | 8 | First round | (9) Texas A&M | L 83–98 |
| 2026 | 4 | First round Second round Sweet Sixteen | (13) Troy (5) Vanderbilt (9) Iowa | W 76–47; W 74–72; L 71–77 |

=== NIT ===
Nebraska has appeared in nineteen National Invitation Tournaments with a record of 24–18, including the 1996 NIT championship.

| Year | Round | Opponent | Result |
|---|---|---|---|
| 1967 | Quarterfinal | Marshall | L 88–119 |
| 1978 | First round Second round | Utah State; Texas | W 67–66; L 48–67 |
| 1980 | First round | Michigan | L 69–76 |
| 1983 | First round Second round Quarterfinal; Semifinal | Tulane; Iona; TCU; DePaul | W 72–65; W 85–73; W 67–57; L 58–68 |
| 1984 | First round Second round | Creighton; Xavier | W 56–54; L 57–58 |
| 1985 | First round Second round | Canisius; UCLA | W 79–66; L 63–82 |
| 1987 | First round Second round Quarterfinal; Semifinal; Third-place game | Marquette; Arkansas; Washington; Southern Miss; Arkansas–Little Rock | W 78–76; W 78–71; W 81–76; L 75–82; W 76–67 |
| 1989 | First round Second round | Arkansas State; Ohio State | W 81–79; L 74–85 |
| 1995 | First round Second round | Georgia; Penn State | W 69–61; L 59–65 |
| 1996 | First round Second round Quarterfinal; Semifinal; Final | Colorado State; Washington State; Fresno State; Tulane; Saint Joseph's | W 91–83; W 82–73; W 83–71; W 90–78; W 60–56 |
| 1997 | First round Second round Quarterfinal | Washington; Nevada; Connecticut | W 67–63; W 78–68; L 67–76 |
| 1999 | First round Second round | UNLV; TCU | W 68–53; L 89–101 |
| 2004 | Opening round First round Second round | Creighton; Niagara; Hawaii | W 71–70; W 78–70; L 83–84 |
| 2006 | First round | Hofstra | L 62–73 |
| 2008 | First round Second round | Charlotte; Ole Miss | W 67–48; L 75–85 ^{OT} |
| 2009 | First round | New Mexico | L 71–83 |
| 2011 | First round | Wichita State | L 49–76 |
| 2018 | First round | Mississippi State | L 59–66 |
| 2019 | First round Second round | Butler; TCU | W 80–76; L 72–88 |

=== College Basketball Crown ===
Nebraska has appeared in one College Basketball Crown with a record of 4–0, including the inaugural championship in 2025.

| Year | Round | Opponent | Result |
|---|---|---|---|
| 2025 | First round Quarterfinal; Semifinal; Championship | Arizona State; Georgetown; Boise State; UCF | W 86–78; W 81–69; W 79–69; W 77–66 |

== After Nebraska ==
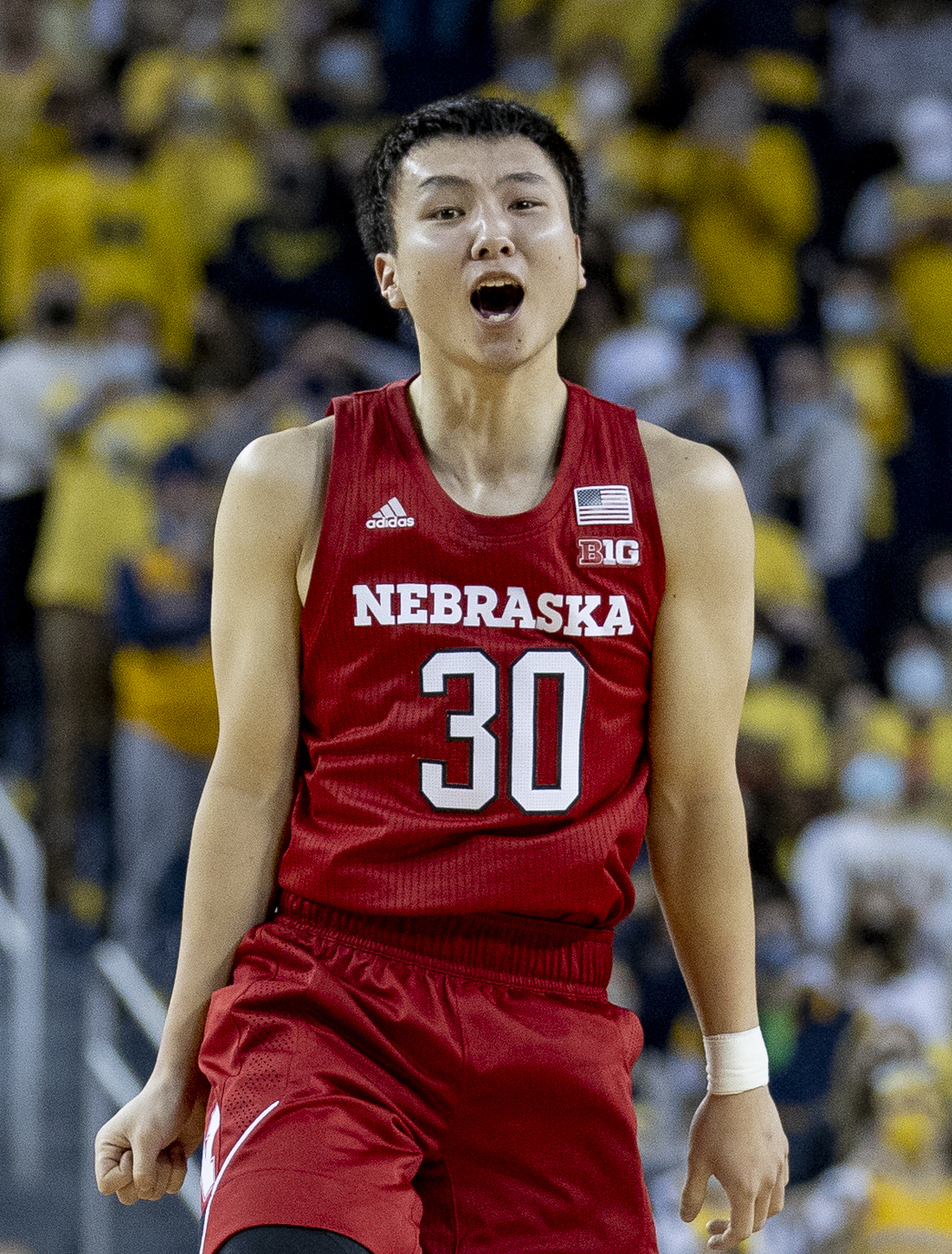
Keisei Tominaga played for Nebraska from 2021 to 2024 and twice represented Japan in the Summer Olympic Games

=== Olympians ===
| Olympiad | City | Player | Country | Finish |
|---|---|---|---|---|
| 2012 (XXX) | (United Kingdom) London | Ade Dagunduro | Nigeria | Preliminary round |
| 2012 (XXX) | (United Kingdom) London | Aleks Marić | Australia | Quarterfinal |
| 2020 (XXXII) | (Japan) Tokyo | Keisei Tominaga | Japan | Quarterfinal (3x3) |
| 2024 (XXXIII) | (France) Paris | Jack McVeigh | Australia | Quarterfinal |
| 2024 (XXXIII) | (France) Paris | Keisei Tominaga | Japan | Preliminary round |
| 2024 (XXXIII) | (France) Paris | Tyronn Lue (asst. coach) | United States | (gold) Champion |

=== NBA players ===
- Herschell Turner – 1968
- Grant Simmons – 1968–1969
- Stu Lantz – 1969–1976
- Dave Hoppen – 1988–1993
- Eric Johnson – 1990
- Rich King – 1992–1995
- Eric Piatkowski – 1995–2008
- Erick Strickland – 1997–2005
- Tony Farmer – 1998–2000
- Tyronn Lue – 1998–2009 (player), 2015–present (head coach)
- Mikki Moore – 1999–2012
- Andrew White – 2018
- Isaiah Roby – 2020–2023
- Dalano Banton – 2022–present
- Bryce McGowens – 2023–present
- Jack McVeigh – 2025
