= 1999–2000 Iowa State Cyclones men's basketball team =

American college basketball season

1999–2000 Iowa State Cyclones men's basketball
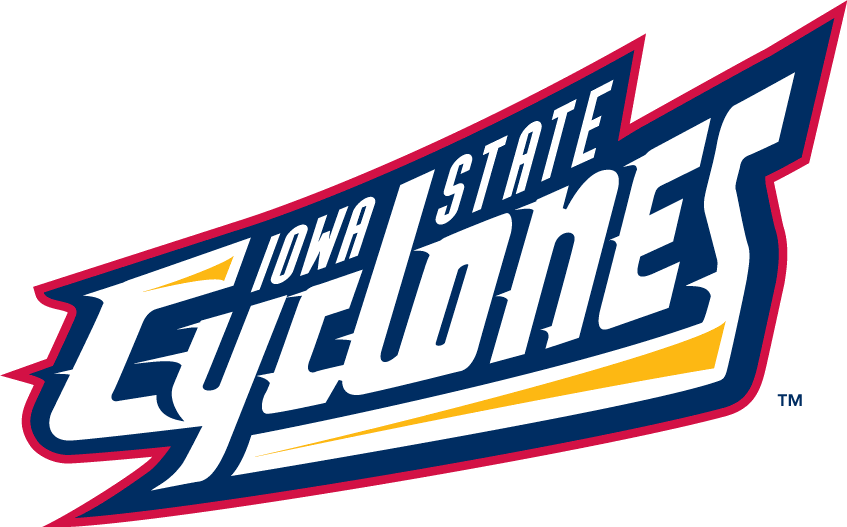

Big 12 regular season champion Big 12 Conference tournament champion

NCAA tournament, Elite Eight
- Conference: Big 12 Conference

Ranking
- Coaches: No. 3
- AP: No. 6
- Record: 32–5 (14–2 Big 12)
- Head coach: Larry Eustachy (2nd season)
- Assistant coaches: Terry Carroll; Leonard Perry; Randy Brown
- Home arena: Hilton Coliseum

1999–2000 Big 12 men's basketball standings
	Conf.				Overall
Team	W		L	PCT	W		L	PCT
No. 6 Iowa State †	14	–	2	.875	32	–	5	.865
No. 15 Texas	13	–	3	.813	24	–	9	.727
No. 12 Oklahoma	12	–	4	.750	27	–	7	.794
No. 14 Oklahoma State	12	–	4	.750	27	–	7	.794
Kansas	11	–	5	.688	24	–	10	.706
Missouri	10	–	6	.625	18	–	13	.581
Colorado	7	–	9	.438	18	–	14	.563
Nebraska	4	–	12	.250	11	–	19	.367
Baylor	4	–	12	.250	14	–	15	.483
Texas A&M	4	–	12	.250	8	–	20	.286
Texas Tech	3	–	13	.188	12	–	16	.429
Kansas State	2	–	14	.125	9	–	19	.321
† 2000 Big 12 Tournament winner Rankings from AP poll

The 1999–2000 Iowa State Cyclones men's basketball team represented Iowa State University during the 1999–2000 NCAA Division I men's basketball season. The Cyclones were coached by Larry Eustachy, who was in his second season. They played their home games at Hilton Coliseum in Ames, Iowa and competed in the Big 12 Conference. The captains were Stevie Johnson and Michael Nurse.

They finished the season 32–5, 14–2 in Big 12 play to win the regular season conference title. They defeated Baylor, Oklahoma State, and Oklahoma to win the Big 12 Conference tournament and earn an automatic bid to the NCAA tournament. They defeated Central Connecticut, Auburn, and UCLA to reach the Elite Eight, where they lost to Michigan State.

== Previous season ==
In the previous season, the Cyclones finished the season 15–15, 6–10 in Big 12 play to finish in 9th place. They lost to Colorado in the first round of the Big 12 Conference tournament.

=== Offseason departures ===
In the offseason, associate head coach Steve Barnes left to become the head coach of the San Jose State Spartans.

In the spring of 1999 Rodney Hampton was arrested for disorderly conduct by the Ames Police. Shortly afterward, head coach Larry Eustachy dismissed him for violating team rules.

While red-shirting the 1998–99 season, Travis Spivey was arrested for simple assault in season and was suspended from the team. After the charges were dropped, he was reinstated. That summer, he was charged with sexual assault and was immediately dismissed from the team.

Shortly after graduation, Tony Rampton represented his home country of New Zealand on their national team, the New Zealand Tall Blacks.

Offseason departures
Name	Position	Reason for departure
Travis Spivey	Guard	Dismissed from team
Lee Love	Guard	Quit the team
Anthony Lloyd	Guard	Quit the team
Paris Corner	Guard	Transferred to Wyoming
Rodney Hampton	Guard	Dismissed from the team
Lamar Gregg	Guard	Transferred out of the program
Klay Edwards	Forward	Graduated
Tony Rampton	Center	Graduated

== Preseason ==
The preseason Big 12 Coaches' Poll picked Iowa State to finish sixth in the conference. Marcus Fizer was named to the Preseason Top 50 by the Wooden Award Committee, as well as the Preseason All-Big 12 first team.

=== Preseason Poll ===
Preseason Poll
Finish	School	Points
1	Kansas (6)	116
2	Texas (5)	113
3	Oklahoma State (1)	103
4	Oklahoma	89
5	Missouri	84
6	Iowa State	55
7	Nebraska	54
8	Colorado	50
9	Texas Tech	47
10	Kansas State	42
11	Texas A&M	23
12	Baylor	16

=== Incoming players ===
Incoming players
Name	Position	Height	Weight	Previous school	Hometown
Richard Evans	Forward	6'5"	190 lbs.	Kilgore College	Dallas, Texas
Jamaal Tinsley	Guard	6'3"	175 lbs.	Mt. San Jacinto JC	Brooklyn, New York
Brandon Hawkins	Guard	6'3"	185 lbs.	St. Thomas More School	Fontana, California
Thomas Watkins	Guard	6'2"	220 lbs.	Mesa CC	Phoenix, Arizona
Clint Varley	Forward	6'4"	210 lbs.	Stuart-Menlo	Menlo, Iowa
Kyle Brumm	Guard	6'1"	185 lbs.	Notre Dame Prep	Merrillville, Indiana
Justin Fries	Guard	6'2"	185 lbs.	Washington	Sioux Falls, South Dakota
Mark Zeige	Center	6'8"	220 lbs.	Grand Rapids High	Grand Rapids, Minnesota

== Regular season ==
On November 23, 1999, Iowa State did not receive any votes in the USA Today/ESPN Top 25 coaches poll. They also were ranked T–47th in the AP Top 25 poll with 2 points. From November 26–28 the Cyclones participated in the Big Island Invitational at Hilo Hawai'i. From December 3–4 the Cyclones hosted the Norwest Cyclone Challenge. From December 21–22 the Cyclones hosted the Tribune Holiday Classic. On December 14, 1999, Iowa State did not receive any votes in the USA Today/ESPN Top 25 coaches poll. They also were ranked T–47th in the AP Top 25 poll with 1 point. On December 21, 1999, Iowa State did not receive any votes in the USA Today/ESPN Top 25 coaches poll. They also were ranked T–46th in the AP Top 25 poll with 1 point. On December 28, 1999, Iowa State did not receive any votes in the USA Today/ESPN Top 25 coaches poll. They also were ranked T–39th in the AP Top 25 poll with 6 points. On January 4, 2000, Iowa State did not receive any votes in the USA Today/ESPN Top 25 coaches poll. They also were ranked T–39th in the AP Top 25 poll with 6 points. On January 11, 2000, Iowa State received 1 point in the USA Today/ESPN Top 25 coaches poll which had them ranked T–47th. They also were ranked 30th in the AP Top 25 poll with 26 points. On January 18, 2000, Iowa State received 6 points in the USA Today/ESPN Top 25 coaches poll which had them ranked T–39th. They also were ranked 29th in the AP Top 25 poll with 56 points. On January 25, 2000, Iowa State received 20 points in the USA Today/ESPN Top 25 coaches poll which had them ranked 29th. They also were ranked 28th in the AP Top 25 poll with 49 points. On February 1, 2000, Iowa State received 76 points in the USA Today/ESPN Top 25 coaches poll which had them ranked 24th. They also were ranked 20th in the AP Top 25 poll with 331 points. On February 8, 2000, Iowa State received 115 points in the USA Today/ESPN Top 25 coaches poll which had them ranked 21st. They also were ranked 17th in the AP Top 25 poll with 519 points. On February 15, 2000, Iowa State received 277 points in the USA Today/ESPN Top 25 coaches poll which had them ranked 17th. They also were ranked 14th in the AP Top 25 poll with 811 points. On February 22, 2000, Iowa State received 229 points in the USA Today/ESPN Top 25 coaches poll which had them ranked 18th. They also were ranked 17th in the AP Top 25 poll with 662 points. On February 29, 2000, Iowa State received 353 points in the USA Today/ESPN Top 25 coaches poll which had them ranked 14th. They also were ranked 10th in the AP Top 25 poll with 1,045 points. The time of the March 4, 2000 Baylor game was changed from 7:00 p.m. CST to 6:00 p.m. CST. On March 4, 2000, Iowa State clinched their first conference title since 1945 with a 75–54 win over Baylor. On March 7, 2000, Iowa State received 478 points in the USA Today/ESPN Top 25 coaches poll which had them ranked 9th. They also were ranked 7th in the AP Top 25 poll with 1,272 points. On March 14, 2000, Iowa State was ranked 6th in the AP Top 25 poll with 1,441 points.

== Post-season ==
Jamaal Tinsley and Marcus Fizer were each named to the Midwest Region All-Tournament team. Head coach Larry Eustachy was also named the Big 12 Coach of the Year and the AP National Coach of the Year. Eustachy also received the Henry Iba Award. Marcus Fizer was named an All-American. Fizer and Tinsley were also named to the Big 12 First Team. Fizer and Tinsley also won the Ralph A. Olsen Award. On March 13, 2000, Iowa State announced that head coach Larry Eustachy had signed a 10-year contract extension. On March 30, 2000, Jamaal Tinsley announced he had elected to stay at Iowa State for his senior season. On March 31, 2000, Larry Eustachy was voted the AP National Coach of the Year. On April 4, 2000, Iowa State received 657 points in the final USA Today/ESPN Top 25 coaches poll which had them ranked 3rd. On April 13, 2000, Larry Eustachy and Marcus Fizer announced that Fizer would forgo his senior season and had signed with an agent.

== Roster ==
1999–2000 Iowa State Cyclones men's basketball team
Players
Coaches

Pos.	#	Name	Height	Weight	Year	Previous school	Hometown
F	00	Richard Evans	6 ft 5 in (1.96 m)	190 lb (86 kg)	Jr	Justin F. Kimball; Kilgore College	Dallas, Texas
G	3	Brandon Nicol (W)	6 ft 1 in (1.85 m)	175 lb (79 kg)	Fr	Graettinger	Graettinger, Iowa
G	4	Kantrail Horton	6 ft 1 in (1.85 m)	225 lb (102 kg)	Jr	Newton Country; Middle Georgia JC	Covington, Georgia
F	5	Marcus Fizer	6 ft 8 in (2.03 m)	265 lb (120 kg)	Jr	Arcadia High	Arcadia, Louisiana
G	11	Jamaal Tinsley	6 ft 3 in (1.91 m)	175 lb (79 kg)	Jr	Samuel J. Tilden; Mt. San Jacinto JC	Brooklyn, New York
G	12	Brandon Hawkins	6 ft 3 in (1.91 m)	185 lb (84 kg)	Fr	Crenshaw High; St. Thomas More School	Fontana, California
F	15	Martin Rančík	6 ft 8 in (2.03 m)	230 lb (104 kg)	Jr	Saint Louis Park	Bratislava, Slovakia
G	21	Thomas Watkins	6 ft 2 in (1.88 m)	220 lb (100 kg)	Jr	South Mountain; Mesa CC	Phoenix, Arizona
F	23	Stevie Johnson (C)	6 ft 4 in (1.93 m)	225 lb (102 kg)	Sr	Perry Central	Beaumont, Mississippi
F	33	Clint Varley	6 ft 4 in (1.93 m)	210 lb (95 kg)	Fr	Stuart-Menlo	Menlo, Iowa
G	34	Kyle Brumm	6 ft 1 in (1.85 m)	185 lb (84 kg)	Fr	Andrean; Notre Dame Prep	Crown Point, Indiana
G	40	Brad Davis (W)	6 ft 0 in (1.83 m)	180 lb (82 kg)	Fr	Knoxville	Knoxville, Iowa
G	42	Justin Fries	6 ft 2 in (1.88 m)	185 lb (84 kg)	Fr	Washington	Sioux Falls, South Dakota
F	45	Paul Shirley	6 ft 9 in (2.06 m)	230 lb (104 kg)	RS Jr	Jefferson West	Meriden, Kansas
C	50	Mark Zeige	6 ft 8 in (2.03 m)	220 lb (100 kg)	Fr	Grand Rapids High	Grand Rapids, Minnesota
G	53	Michael Nurse (C)	6 ft 1 in (1.85 m)	175 lb (79 kg)	Sr	Teaneck High; Shorter College; Monroe College	Teaneck, New Jersey

Head coach

- Larry Eustachy (Long Beach State)

Assistant coach(es)

- Terry Carroll (Northern Iowa)
- Leonard Perry (Idaho)
- Randy Brown (Iowa)

Athletic trainer(s)

- Steve Condon (Northwest Missouri State)

Legend

- (C) Team captain
- (S) Suspended
- (I) Ineligible
- (W) Walk-on
- Injured
- Current redshirt

== Statistics ==
- Minutes: Michael Nurse 1305
- MPG: Michael Nurse 35.3
- Points: Marcus Fizer 844
- PPG: Marcus Fizer 22.8
- Rebounds: Marcus Fizer 285
- RPG: Marcus Fizer 7.7
- Field goals: Marcus Fizer 327
- FG%: Stevie Johnson .663
- 3FG: Michael Nurse 99
- 3FG%: Michael Nurse .423
- Assists: Jamaal Tinsley 244
- APG: Jamaal Tinsley 6.6
- Blocks: Marcus Fizer 39
- BPG: Marcus Fizer 1.1
- Steals: Jamaal Tinsley 67
- SPG: Jamaal Tinsley 2.6
- Free throws: Marcus Fizer 175
- FT%: Kantrail Horton .780

== Player stats ==
Note: GP = games played; MPG = minutes per game; SPG = steals per game; RPG = rebounds per game; APG = assists per pame; BPG = blocks per game; PPG = points per game

Player	GP	MPG	SPG	RPG	APG	BPG	PPG
Kyle Brumm	6	2.1	0.2	0.5	0.0	0.0	0.0
Brad Davis	10	2.9	0.0	0.6	0.3	0.1	0.8
Richard Evans	27	6.4	0.1	2.1	0.2	0.0	2.0
Marcus Fizer	37	33.6	0.8	7.7	1.1	1.1	22.8
Justin Fries	8	2.5	0.3	0.5	0.1	0.1	0.9
Brandon Hawkins	37	12.7	0.5	2.2	0.8	0.0	3.2
Kantrail Horton	35	34.8	0.9	4.1	2.6	0.1	8.7
Stevie Johnson	35	25.3	1.0	6.1	1.2	0.3	9.1
Brandon Nicol	8	2.0	0.0	0.3	0.5	0.0	0.6
Michael Nurse	37	35.3	1.0	2.7	2.2	0.1	12.5
Martin Rančík	22	15.0	0.5	3.8	0.4	0.5	5.5
Paul Shirley	29	17.6	0.3	4.4	0.5	0.3	7.7
Jamaal Tinsley	37	32.8	2.6	5.1	6.6	1.0	11.0
Clint Varley	10	2.1	0.1	1.1	0.1	0.0	0.6
Thomas Watkins	7	3.7	0.0	0.4	0.1	0.0	2.6

== Schedule and results ==
Date time, TV	Rank^{#}	Opponent^{#}	Result	Record	Site city, state
Regular season
November 10, 1999; 7:00 p.m.		Global Sports	W 87-76		Hilton Coliseum; Ames, Iowa
Regular season
November 15, 1999*; 7:00 p.m.		Simon Fraser	W 79–54	1–0	Hilton Coliseum; Ames, Iowa
November 19, 1999*; 7:05 p.m., Drake TV		at Drake	L 44–48	1–1	Knapp Center; Des Moines, Iowa
November 26, 1999*; 11:30 p.m.		at Hawaii-Hilo; Big Island Invitational	W 108–72	2–1	Afook-Chinen Auditorium; Hilo, HI
November 27, 1999*; 9:00 p.m.		vs. Arkansas; Big Island Invitational	W 77–71	3–1	Afook-Chinen Auditorium; Hilo, HI
November 28, 1999*; 8:00 p.m.		vs. No. 1 Cincinnati; Big Island Invitational	L 60–75	3–2	Afook-Chinen Auditorium; Hilo, HI
December 3, 1999*; 8:00 p.m., CTN		Mississippi Valley State; Norwest Cyclone Challenge	W 106–64	4–2	Hilton Coliseum; Ames, Iowa
December 4, 1999*; 8:00 p.m., CTN		Sam Houston State; Norwest Cyclone Challenge	W 84–69	5–2	Hilton Coliseum; Ames, Iowa
December 8, 1999*; 7:00 p.m.		Milwaukee	W 78–64	6–2	Hilton Coliseum; Ames, Iowa
December 11, 1999*; 8:00 p.m., CTN		Iowa; Big Four Classic	W 79–66	7–2	Hilton Coliseum; Ames, Iowa
December 19, 1999*; 6:00 p.m., CTN		Northern Iowa; Big Four Classic	W 73–41	8–2	Hilton Coliseum; Ames, Iowa
December 21, 1999*; 8:00 p.m., CTN		Idaho State; The Tribune Holiday Classic	W 89–49	9–2	Hilton Coliseum; Ames, Iowa
December 22, 1999*; 8:00 p.m., CTN		Texas A&M–Corpus Christi; The Tribune Holiday Classic	W 86–64	10–2	Hilton Coliseum; Ames, Iowa
December 28, 1999*; 7:00 p.m.		Maryland Eastern Shore	W 81–52	11–2	Hilton Coliseum; Ames, Iowa
January 2, 2000*; 6:00 p.m.		Arkansas State	W 84–53	12–2	Hilton Coliseum; Ames, Iowa
January 8, 2000; 4:00 p.m., ESPN		Missouri	W 86–81	13–2 (1–0)	Hilton Coliseum; Ames, Iowa
January 12, 2000; 7:05 p.m.		at Nebraska	W 66–65	14–2 (2–0)	Bob Devaney Center; Lincoln, Nebraska
January 16, 2000; 1:00 p.m., ESPN Plus		Colorado	W 86–72	15–2 (3–0)	Hilton Coliseum; Ames, Iowa
January 19, 2000; 8:00 p.m., ESPN Plus		at Kansas State	W 72–61	16–2 (4–0)	Bramlage Coliseum; Manhattan, Kansas
January 22, 2000; 3:00 p.m., ESPN Plus/Big 12		at No. 17 Oklahoma	L 75–80 ^{2OT}	16–3 (4–1)	Lloyd Noble Center; Norman, Oklahoma
January 26, 2000; 7:00 p.m., ESPN Plus/CTN		Texas A&M	W 65–58	17–3 (5–1)	Hilton Coliseum; Ames, Iowa
January 29, 2000; 3:00 p.m., ESPN Plus/Big 12		No. 12 Kansas	W 74–66	18–3 (6–1)	Hilton Coliseum; Ames, Iowa
February 2, 2000; 7:00 p.m., CTN	No. 20	Kansas State	W 85–67	19–3 (7–1)	Hilton Coliseum; Ames, Iowa
February 9, 2000; 7:00 p.m., ESPN Plus/CTN	No. 17	at Missouri	W 72–62	20–3 (8–1)	Hearnes Center; Columbia, Missouri
February 12, 2000; 7:00 p.m., ESPN Plus/CTN	No. 17	Nebraska	W 87–65	21–3 (9–1)	Hilton Coliseum; Ames, Iowa
February 16, 2000; 8:00 p.m., ESPN Plus/Big 12	No. 14	at No. 24 Kansas	W 64–62	22–3 (10–1)	Allen Fieldhouse; Lawrence, Kansas
February 19, 2000; 3:00 p.m., ESPN Plus/Big 12	No. 14	at Colorado	L 90–102 ^{OT}	22–4 (10–2)	Coors Events Center; Boulder, Colorado
February 24, 2000; 7:00 p.m., ESPN Plus/CTN	No. 17	No. 14 Texas	W 89–77	23–4 (11–2)	Hilton Coliseum; Ames, Iowa
February 26, 2000; 3:00 p.m., ESPN Plus/Big 12	No. 17	No. 10 Oklahoma State	W 72–61	24–4 (12–2)	Hilton Coliseum; Ames, Iowa
March 1, 2000; 7:00 p.m., ESPN Plus/CTN	No. 10	at Texas Tech	W 87–79	25–4 (13–2)	United Supermarkets Arena; Lubbock, Texas
March 4, 2000; 6:00 p.m., ESPN Plus/CTN	No. 10	at Baylor	W 75–54	26–4 (14–2)	Ferrell Center; Waco, Texas
Big 12 Tournament
March 10, 2000; 12:00 p.m., ESPN Plus/Big 12	No. 7	vs. Baylor; Quarterfinals	W 76–64	27–4	Kemper Arena; Kansas City, Missouri
March 11, 2000; 1:00 p.m., ESPN Plus/Big 12	No. 7	vs. No. 17 Oklahoma State; Semifinals	W 68–64	28–4	Kemper Arena; Kansas City, Missouri
March 12, 2000; 12:00 p.m., ESPN	No. 7	vs. No. 15 Oklahoma; Championship	W 70–58	29–4	Kemper Arena; Kansas City, Missouri
NCAA tournament
March 16, 2000; 1:55 p.m., CBS	(2 MW) No. 6	vs. (15 MW) Central Connecticut; First round	W 88–78	30–4	Hubert Humphrey Metrodome; Minneapolis
March 18, 2000; 4:38 p.m., CBS	(2 MW) No. 6	vs. (7 MW) No. 24 Auburn; Second round	W 79–60	31–4	Hubert Humphrey Metrodome; Minneapolis
March 23, 2000; 8:55 p.m., CBS	(2 MW) No. 6	vs. (6 MW) UCLA; Midwest Regional semifinal – Sweet Sixteen	W 80–56	32–4	The Palace at Auburn Hills; Auburn Hills, Michigan
March 25, 2000; 6:00 p.m., CBS	(2 MW) No. 6	vs. (1 MW) No. 2 Michigan State; Midwest Regional Final – Elite Eight	L 64–75	32–5	The Palace at Auburn Hills; Auburn Hills, Michigan
*Non-conference game. ^{#}Rankings from AP poll. (#) Tournament seedings in parentheses. MW=Midwest. All times are in Central Time.

== Rankings ==
The Cyclones finished the season ranked 3rd in the Coaches Poll, the highest final ranking in school history.

Ranking movement Legend: ██ Improvement in ranking. ██ Decrease in ranking. ██ Not ranked the previous week. rv=Others receiving votes.
Poll	Pre	Wk 1	Wk 2	Wk 3	Wk 4	Wk 5	Wk 6	Wk 7	Wk 8	Wk 9	Wk 10	Wk 11	Wk 12	Wk 13	Wk 14	Wk 15	Wk 16	Wk 17	Wk 18	Final
AP	NR	NR	RV	NR	NR	RV	RV	RV	RV	RV	RV	RV	20	17	14	17	10	7	6	–
Coaches		–	NR		NR	NR	NR	NR	NR	RV	RV	RV	24	21	17	18	14	9	–	3

== Awards and honors ==
- Consensus First Team All-American

Marcus Fizer

- Big 12 Player of the Year

Marcus Fizer

- Big 12 Newcomer of the Year

Jamaal Tinsley

- Big 12 Coach of the Year

Larry Eustachy

- All-Big 12 Team

Marcus Fizer (First Team)
Jamaal Tinsley (Second Team)
Michael Nurse (Honorable Mention)

- Big 12 All-Defense Team

Jamaal Tinsley

- Big 12 All-Newcomer Team

Jamaal Tinsley

- NCAA Midwest Region All-Tournament Team

Marcus Fizer
Jamaal Tinsley

- Big 12 All-Tournament Team

Marcus Fizer (Most Outstanding Player)
Jamaal Tinsley
Michael Nurse

- Big 12 Player of the Week

Marcus Fizer (December 7)
Marcus Fizer (February 14)
Marcus Fizer (February 28)
Marcus Fizer (March 5)

- Big 12 Rookie of the Week

Jamaal Tinsley (January 10)

- Pete Newell Big Man Award

Marcus Fizer

- AP Coach of the Year

Larry Eustachy

- Henry Iba Award

Larry Eustachy

- National Newcomer of the Year

Jamaal Tinsley

- Academic All-Big 12

Paul Shirley

- Ralph A. Olsen Award

Marcus Fizer
