= 2000 Big 12 men's basketball tournament =

- Classification: Division I
- Season: 1999–00
- Teams: 12
- Site: Kemper Arena; Kansas City, Missouri
- Champions: Iowa State (1st title)
- Winning coach: Larry Eustachy (1st title)
- MVP: Marcus Fizer (Iowa State)
- Attendance: 114,600 (overall); 19,100 (championship)
- Top scorer: Marcus Fizer (Iowa State) (79 points)
- Television: ESPN

1999–2000 Big 12 men's basketball standings
	Conf.				Overall
Team	W		L	PCT	W		L	PCT
No. 6 Iowa State †	14	–	2	.875	32	–	5	.865
No. 15 Texas	13	–	3	.813	24	–	9	.727
No. 12 Oklahoma	12	–	4	.750	27	–	7	.794
No. 14 Oklahoma State	12	–	4	.750	27	–	7	.794
Kansas	11	–	5	.688	24	–	10	.706
Missouri	10	–	6	.625	18	–	13	.581
Colorado	7	–	9	.438	18	–	14	.563
Nebraska	4	–	12	.250	11	–	19	.367
Baylor	4	–	12	.250	14	–	15	.483
Texas A&M	4	–	12	.250	8	–	20	.286
Texas Tech	3	–	13	.188	12	–	16	.429
Kansas State	2	–	14	.125	9	–	19	.321
† 2000 Big 12 Tournament winner Rankings from AP poll

The 2000 Phillips 66 Big 12 men's basketball tournament was the postseason men's basketball tournament for the Big 12 Conference. It was played from March 9–12 at Kemper Arena in Kansas City, Missouri. No. 1 seed Iowa State defeated Oklahoma 70–58 to win the championship and receive the Big 12's automatic bid to the 2000 NCAA tournament.

== Seeding ==
The Tournament consisted of a 12 team single-elimination tournament with the top 4 seeds receiving a bye.

2000 Big 12 Men's Basketball Tournament seeds
Seed	School	Conf.	Over.	Tiebreaker
1	Iowa State ‡#	14–2	32–5	
2	Texas #	13–3	24–9	
3	Oklahoma #	12–4	27–7	
4	Oklahoma State #	12–4	27–7	
5	Kansas	11–5	24–10	
6	Missouri	10–6	18–13	
7	Colorado	7–9	18–14	
8	Nebraska	4–12	11–19	
9	Baylor	4–12	14–15	
10	Texas A&M	4–12	8–20	
11	Texas Tech	3–13	12–16	
12	Kansas State	2–14	9–19	
‡ – Big 12 Conference regular season champions, and tournament No. 1 seed. # – Received a single-bye in the conference tournament. Overall records include all games played in the Big 12 Conference tournament.

== Schedule ==
Session	Game	Time	Matchup	Television	Attendance
First Round – Thursday, March 9
1	1	12:00 PM	#9 Baylor 63 vs #8 Nebraska 55	Big 12	19,100
1	2	2:20 PM	#5 Kansas 84 vs #12 Kansas State 60	Big 12	19,100
2	3	6:00 PM	#7 Colorado 79 vs #10 Texas A&M 53	Big 12	19,100
2	4	8:20 PM	#6 Missouri 80 vs #11 Texas Tech 47	Big 12	19,100
Quarterfinals – Friday, March 10
3	5	12:00 PM	#1 Iowa State 76 vs #9 Baylor 64	Big 12	19,100
3	6	2:20 PM	#4 Oklahoma State 77 vs #5 Kansas 58	Big 12	19,100
4	7	6:00 PM	#2 Texas 78 vs #7 Colorado 35	Big 12	19,100
4	8	8:20 PM	#3 Oklahoma 84 vs #6 Missouri 80 ^{OT}	Big 12	19,100
Semifinals – Saturday, March 11
5	9	1:00 PM	#1 Iowa State 68 vs #4 Oklahoma State 64	Big 12	19,100
5	10	3:20 PM	#3 Oklahoma 81 vs #2 Texas 65	Big 12	19,100
Final – Sunday, March 12
6	11	2:00 PM	#1 Iowa State 70 vs #3 Oklahoma 58	ESPN	19,100
Game times in CT. #-Rankings denote tournament seed

== Bracket ==
First round Wednesday, March 9
8	Nebraska	55
9	Baylor	63
5	#24 Kansas	84
12	Kansas State	60
7	Colorado	79
10	Texas A&M	52
6	Missouri	80
11	Texas Tech	47

Quarterfinals; Thursday, March 10
1	#7 Iowa State	76
9	Baylor	64
4	#17 Oklahoma State	77
5	#24 Kansas	58
2	#13 Texas	78
7	Colorado	35
3	#15 Oklahoma	84*
6	Missouri	80

Semifinals; Friday, March 11
1	#7 Iowa State	68
4	#17 Oklahoma State	64
2	#13 Texas	65
3	#15 Oklahoma	81

Championship; Saturday, March 12
1	#7 Iowa State	70
3	#15 Oklahoma	58

* Denotes overtime period

== All-Tournament Team ==
Most Outstanding Player – Marcus Fizer, Iowa State

Player	Team	Position	Class
Marcus Fizer	Iowa State	Jr.	F
Stevie Johnson	Iowa State	Sr.	F
Jamaal Tinsley	Iowa State	Jr.	G
Eduardo Najera	Oklahoma	Sr.	F
Chris Mihm	Texas	Jr.	C

== See also ==
- 2000 Big 12 Conference women's basketball tournament
- 2000 NCAA Division I men's basketball tournament
- 1999–2000 NCAA Division I men's basketball rankings
