= Paul Shirley =

American basketball player (born 1977)

Personal information
- Born: December 23, 1977 (age 48) Redwood City, California, U.S.
- Listed height: 6 ft 10 in (2.08 m)
- Listed weight: 230 lb (104 kg)

Career information
- High school: Jefferson West (Meriden, Kansas)
- College: Iowa State (1996–2001)
- NBA draft: 2001: undrafted
- Playing career: 2001–2008
- Position: Power forward
- Number: 45, 17

Career history
- 2001–2002: Panionios Athens
- 2002–2003: Yakima Sun Kings
- 2002–2003: Atlanta Hawks
- 2003: Joventut Badalona
- 2003–2004: Kansas City Knights
- 2004: Chicago Bulls
- 2004: UNICS Kazan
- 2005: Phoenix Suns
- 2005: Beijing Aoshen Olympians
- 2007–2008: ViveMenorca
- 2008: Unicaja Málaga

Career highlights
- CBA All-Star Game (2003); Academic All-American (2001)
- Stats at NBA.com
- Stats at Basketball Reference

Paul Murphy Shirley (born December 23, 1977) is an American former professional basketball player who played briefly in the National Basketball Association (NBA), as well as in several other leagues.

Shirley is noted for briefly maintaining an online journal (blog) while playing for the Phoenix Suns in 2004–05. His first journal dealt with a several-day-long road trip, while the second chronicled the Suns' NBA Playoffs run. He was later the author of a blog for ESPN.com entitled "My So-Called Career".

Shirley was signed to a non-guaranteed contract by the Minnesota Timberwolves in early October 2006, but was cut in training camp before the start of the 2006–07 season. He finished his career in Spain, playing in the ACB for ViveMenorca and Unicaja Malaga.

After Shirley's playing career, he wrote a column for the Spanish newspaper El Pais, maintained a podcast (Short Corner) with Justin Halpern, and founded a writing group in Los Angeles called Writers Blok.

Shirley's first book, Can I Keep My Jersey?, was released in 2007. His second book, Stories I Tell On Dates, came out October 17, 2017. His third book (and first novel), Ball Boy, was released in February 2021.

== Career ==
Shirley was born in Redwood City, California, and grew up near the small town of Meriden, Kansas. He played high school basketball at Jefferson West High School, where he was a National Merit Finalist.

Shirley worked his way from walk-on to three-year starter for the Iowa State University men's basketball team. He was coached first by Tim Floyd (until Floyd left the Cyclones to become the head coach of the Chicago Bulls) and then by Larry Eustachy. Notable teammates included future NBA players Jamaal Tinsley, Kelvin Cato, and Marcus Fizer.

After winning the Big XII's regular-season conference championship, the Cyclones advanced to the Elite Eight of the NCAA basketball tournament during Shirley's junior season, losing to eventual champion Michigan State. At the end of Shirley's senior year, Iowa State became the fourth number-two seed to lose in the first round of the tournament.

During his college career, Shirley earned three Academic All-Big 12 selections and, in his senior season, was named second-team Academic All-American. He graduated with a degree in mechanical engineering.

After college, the 6'10" Shirley played power forward for thirteen different professional teams including, in the NBA, the Phoenix Suns, Atlanta Hawks, and the Chicago Bulls, as well as Panionios Athens of the Greek A1 League, Joventut Badalona, ViveMenorca, and Unicaja Málaga of the Spanish ACB League, and UNICS Kazan of the Russian Super League.

Shirley also appeared in NBA preseason games with the Los Angeles Lakers, New Orleans Hornets, and Minnesota Timberwolves, and played summer league games with the Timberwolves and Cleveland Cavaliers.

Shirley played a total of 18 games in the NBA from 2002 to 2005 where he averaged 1.8 points and 1.1 rebounds. His final game was during his tenure with the Phoenix Suns on April 20, 2005, in a 107–132 loss to the Sacramento Kings where he played for 4 minutes and the only stat he recorded was 1 assist.

Shirley has three younger brothers, including chartmaker Matt Shirley. He appeared in the film Glory Road (#50 for Iowa, uncredited) and in an episode of the TBS Sitcom Ground Floor (Kevin).

He also produced an unaired television pilot for Twentieth Century Fox called The Twelfth Man.

== Writing career ==
Shirley's blogs at ESPN and elsewhere contained observations on players, teams, fans, cities, sports media, cheerleaders, the game of basketball, and topics outside the athletic sphere. He commented on topics such as the USA Patriot Act, which he condemned as "[putting] the US on a fast-track to an Orwellian destiny". His writing garnered attention from national sports media, as well as other outlets such as Newsweek, The Wall Street Journal, and by ESPN's Bill Simmons.

Shirley's first book, Can I Keep My Jersey?, was published on May 15, 2007, by Random House. It received positive reviews from The Onion's AV Club, which noted that it "deserves a spot next to Ball Four." A paperback version of the book was released on December 26, 2007.

His second book, Stories I Tell On Dates, came out October 17, 2017. A podcast of the same name followed soon after.

His third book, Ball Boy, was released February 2, 2021.

Between 2008 and 2015, Shirley wrote a monthly column about the NBA called "Historias de un Tío Alto" (loosely: "Stories by a Tall Guy") in El Pais.

=== ESPN dismissal ===
Shirley's writings have sometimes been the cause of controversy. In a Slate.com piece with Neal Pollack, he compared rooting for the San Antonio Spurs to cheering for cancer. In a 2009 column for ESPN.com, he called the Beatles overrated, drawing the ire of fellow music critics. And in 2010, he published a blog questioning the potential efficacy of relief efforts for that year's earthquake in Haiti. Afterward, he was dismissed by ESPN. The company's full statement read: "He was a part-time freelance contributor. The views he expressed on another site of course do not at all reflect our company's views on the Haiti relief efforts. He will no longer contribute to ESPN."

== Statistics ==
=== Collegiate statistics ===
Year	Age	Team	G	GS	MIN	FGM	FGA	3PM	3PA	FTM	FTA	REB	AST	STL	BLK	TO	PF	PTS
**4 Season Totals**			**109**	**46**	**N/A**	**283**	**511**	**1**	**2**	**255**	**373**	**552**	**69**	**58**	**45**	**153**	**N/A**	**822**

Source: Cyclones.com and Sports-Reference.com

=== Professional statistics ===
Legend
GP	Games played	GS	Games started	MPG	Minutes per game
FG%	Field goal percentage	3P%	3-point field goal percentage	FT%	Free throw percentage
RPG	Rebounds per game	APG	Assists per game	SPG	Steals per game
BPG	Blocks per game	PPG	Points per game	**Bold**	Career high

==== Regular season ====
Year	Team	GP	GS	MPG	FG%	3P%	FT%	RPG	APG	SPG	BPG	PPG
2002–03	Atlanta	2	0	2.5	.000	.000	.000	0.5	0.0	0.0	0.0	0.0
2003–04	Chicago	7	0	**12.3**	.435	.000	.000	**2.3**	**0.6**	**0.1**	**0.1**	**3.0**
2004–05	Phoenix	**9**	0	3.3	**.455**	.000	**.500**	0.2	0.3	0.0	0.0	1.3
Career		18	0	6.7	.395	.000	.429	1.1	0.4	0.05	0.05	1.8
