= Big 12 Conference Men's Basketball Player of the Year =

American collegiate award

Big 12 Men's Basketball Player of the Year
- Awarded for: the most outstanding basketball player in the Big 12 Conference
- Country: United States
- Presented by: Phillips 66

History
- First award: 1997
- Most recent: Jaden Bradley, Arizona

The Big 12 Conference Men's Basketball Player of the Year is an award given to the Big 12 Conference's most outstanding player. The award was first given following the 1996–97 season, the first year of conference competition but three years after the conference's official formation. It is selected by the league's head coaches, who are not allowed to vote for their own players. Kansas has had the most individual winners of the award with 12.

Only two players have won the award multiple times: Raef LaFrentz of Kansas, who won the first two awards in 1997 and 1998, and Buddy Hield of Oklahoma, who won the award in 2015 and 2016.

Four freshmen have won the award: Kevin Durant of Texas, Michael Beasley of Kansas State, Marcus Smart of Oklahoma State, and Cade Cunningham of Oklahoma State.

Nine current Big 12 institutions have yet to have a winner. Baylor is the only continuously present charter member without a winner. Another charter member, Colorado, left for the Pac-12 Conference in 2011 but returned in 2024. Two others joined in the 2010s: TCU in 2011 and West Virginia in 2012. The other five made their Big 12 debuts in the 2020s: BYU, Cincinnati, and UCF in 2023–24, with Arizona State and Utah in 2024–25.

In addition, two former Big 12 institutions never had a winner of the award during their tenure in the Big 12: Missouri and Texas A&M.

== Key ==
†	Co-Players of the Year
*	Awarded a national player of the year award that same season: Oscar Robertson Trophy (1958–59 to present); Naismith College Player of the Year (1968–69 to present); John R. Wooden Award (1976–77 to present)
Player (X)	Denotes the number of times the player has been awarded the Big 12 Player of the Year award at that point

== Winners ==
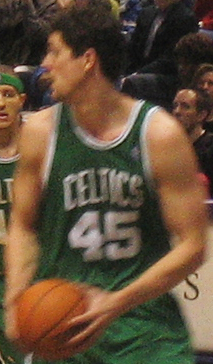
Raef LaFrentz, Kansas, 1997 and 1998

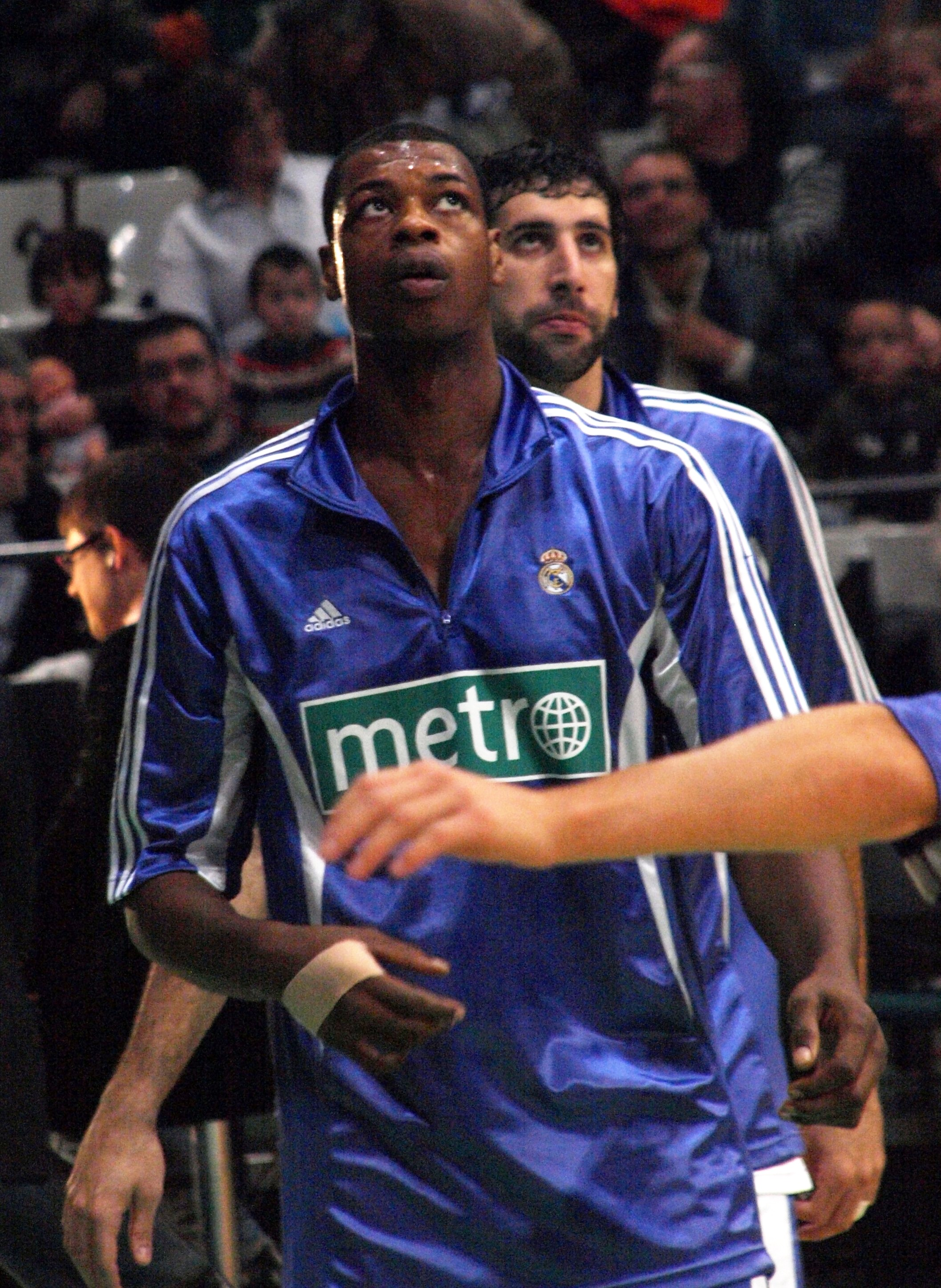
Venson Hamilton, Nebraska, 1999

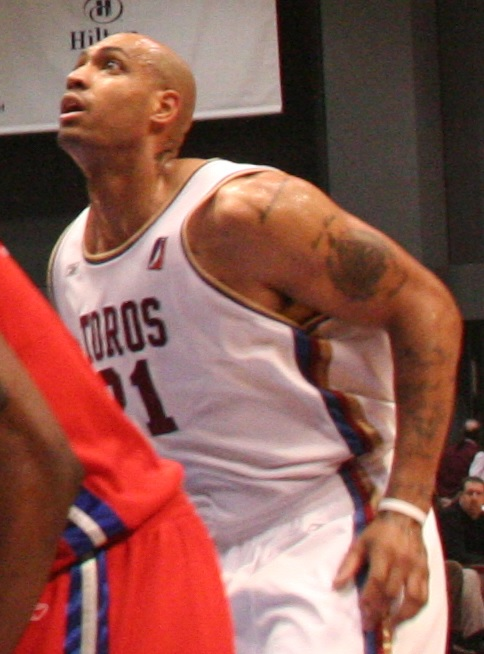
Marcus Fizer, Iowa State, 2000

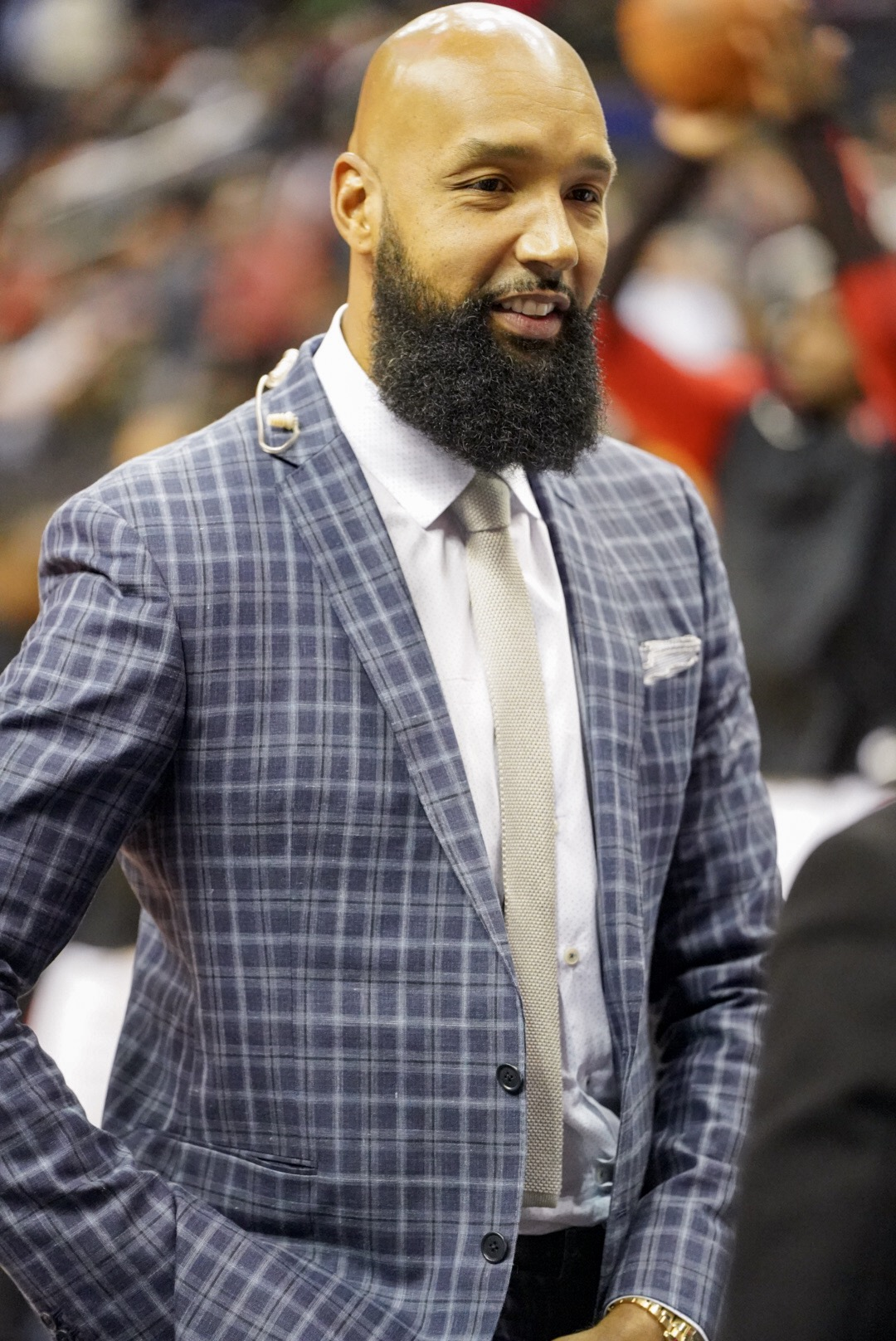
Drew Gooden, Kansas, 2002

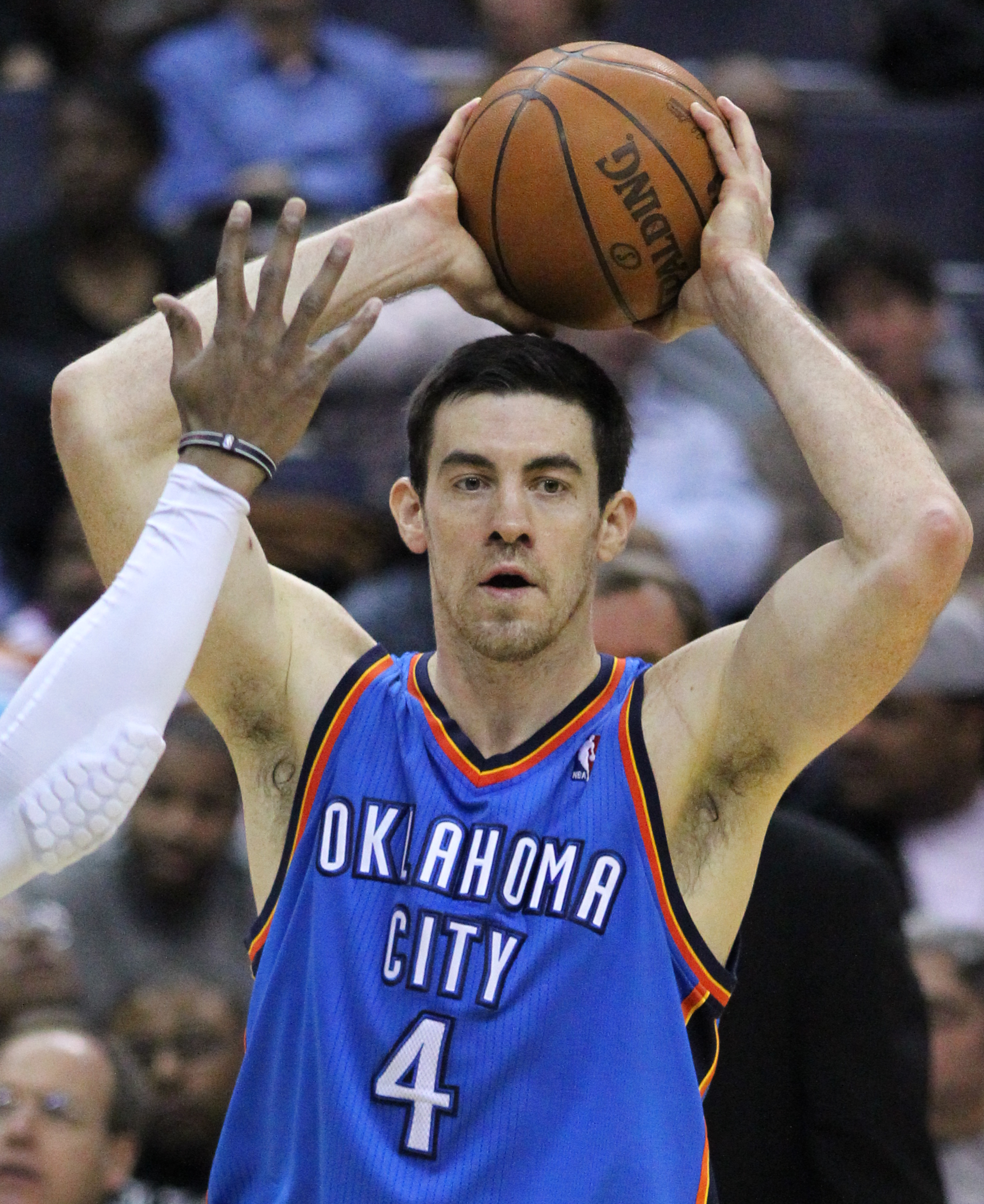
Nick Collison, Kansas, 2003

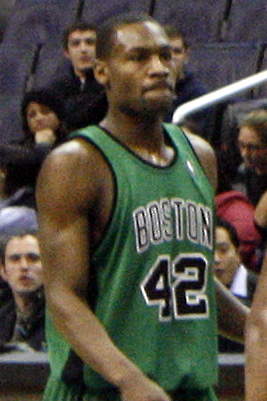
Tony Allen, Oklahoma State, 2004

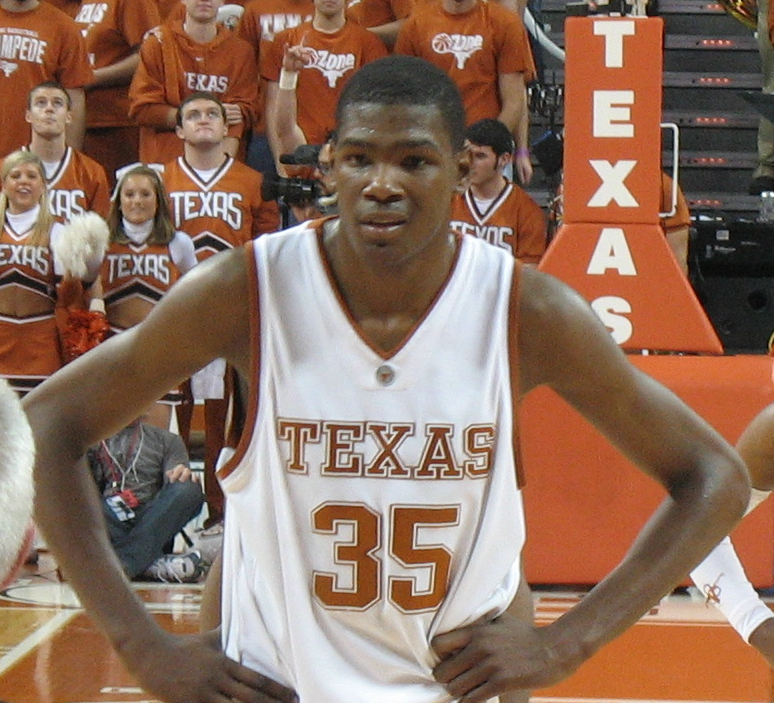
Kevin Durant, Texas, 2007

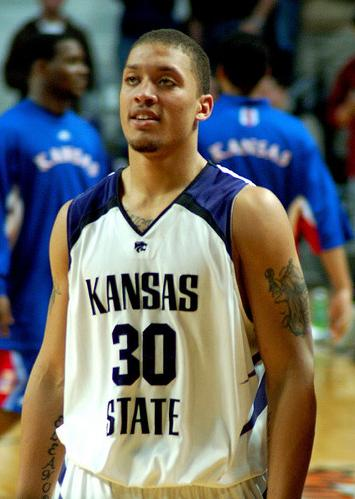
Michael Beasley, Kansas State, 2008

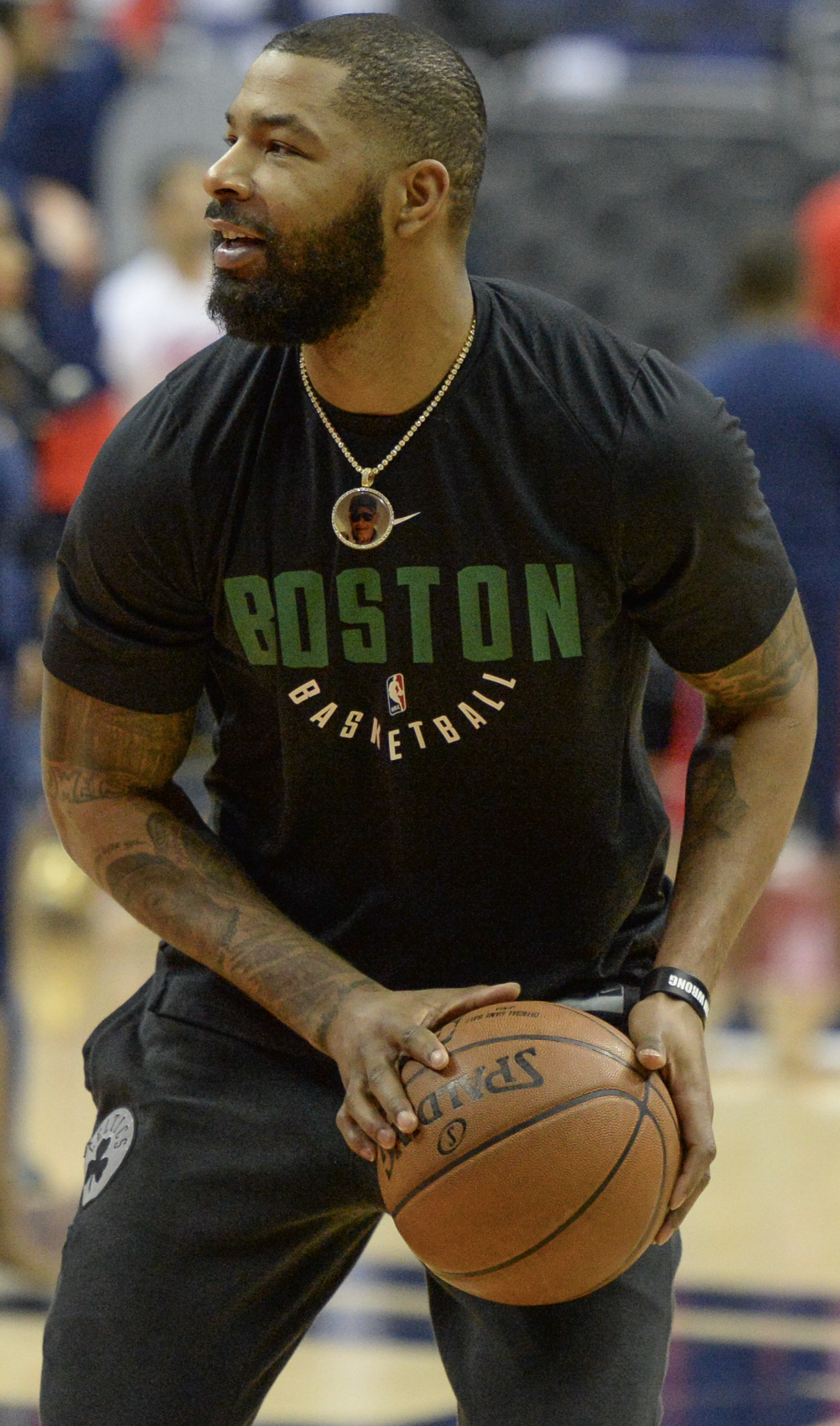
Marcus Morris, Kansas, 2011

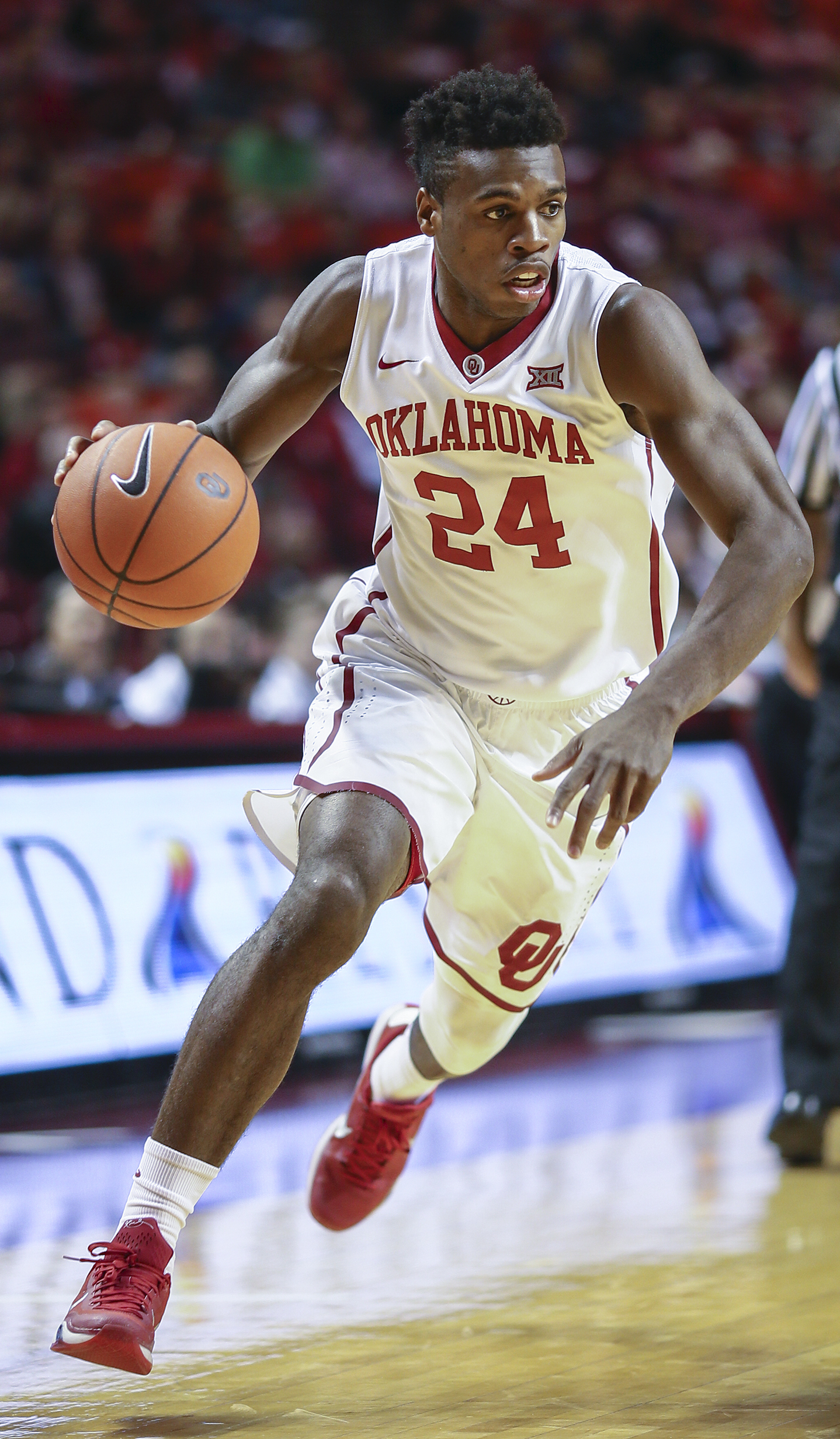
Buddy Hield, Oklahoma, 2015 and 2016

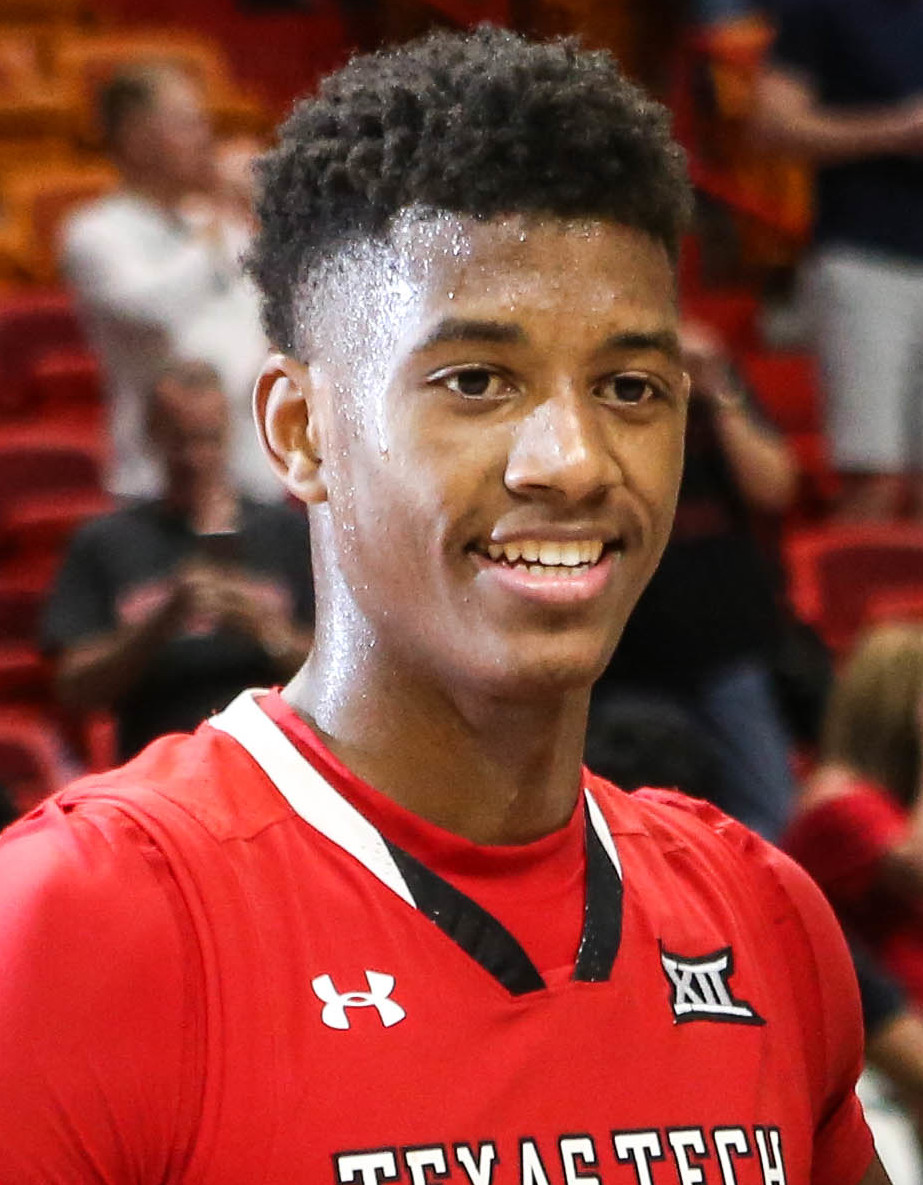
Jarrett Culver, Texas Tech, 2019

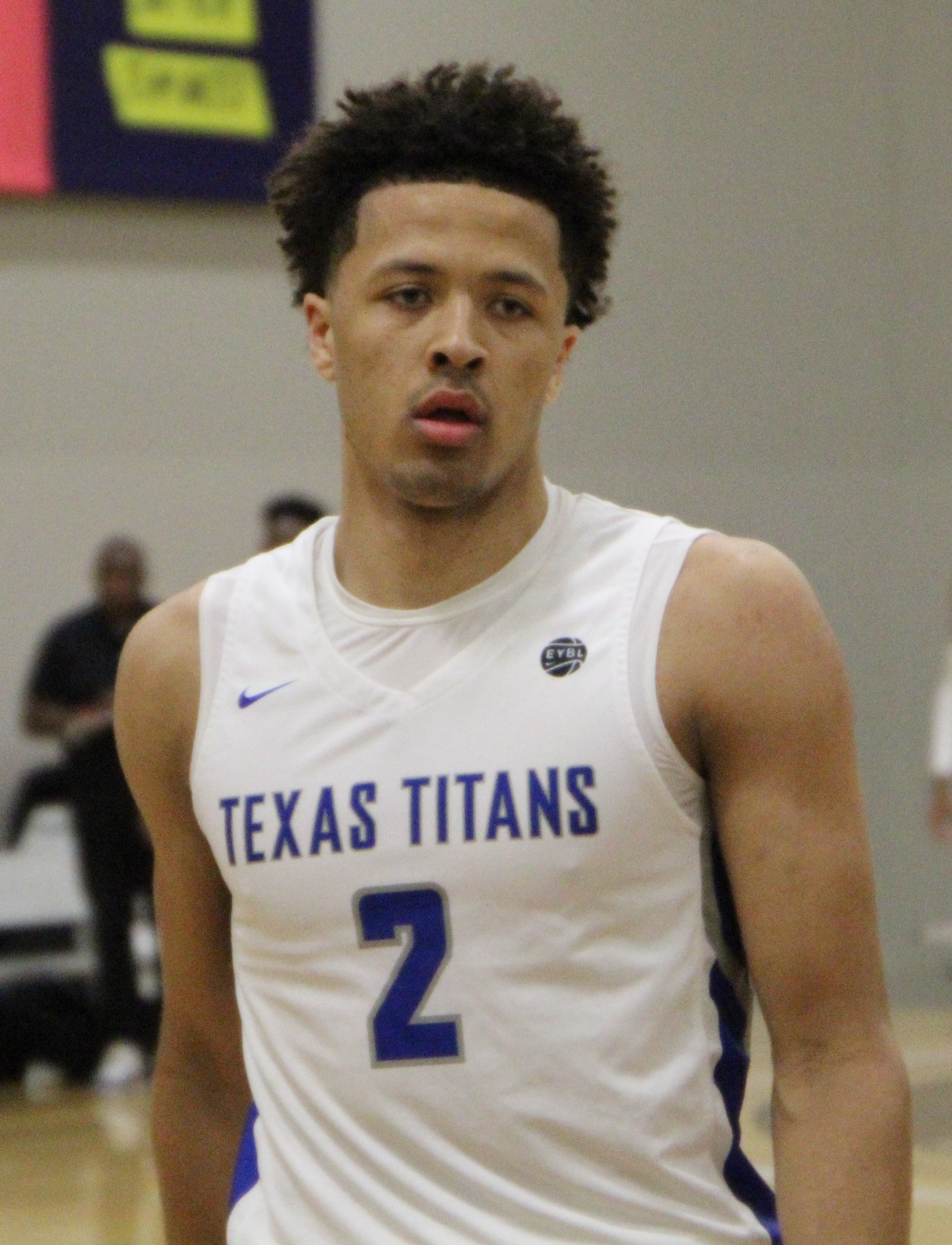
Cade Cunningham, Oklahoma State, 2021

Season	Player	School	Position	Class	Reference
1996–97	Raef LaFrentz	Kansas	PF	Junior	
1997–98	Raef LaFrentz (2)	Kansas	PF	Senior	
1998–99	Venson Hamilton	Nebraska	C	Senior	
1999–00	Marcus Fizer	Iowa State	PF	Junior	
2000–01	Jamaal Tinsley	Iowa State	PG	Senior	
2001–02	Drew Gooden	Kansas	PF	Junior	
2002–03	Nick Collison	Kansas	PF	Senior	
2003–04	Tony Allen	Oklahoma State	SG	Senior	
2004–05	Wayne Simien	Kansas	PF	Senior	
2005–06	P. J. Tucker	Texas	SF	Junior	
2006–07	Kevin Durant*	Texas	SF	Freshman	
2007–08	Michael Beasley	Kansas State	PF	Freshman	
2008–09	Blake Griffin*	Oklahoma	PF	Sophomore	
2009–10	James Anderson	Oklahoma State	SG	Junior	
2010–11	Marcus Morris	Kansas	PF	Junior	
2011–12	Thomas Robinson	Kansas	PF	Junior	
2012–13	Marcus Smart	Oklahoma State	PG	Freshman	
2013–14	Melvin Ejim	Iowa State	SF	Senior	
2014–15	Buddy Hield	Oklahoma	SG	Junior	
2015–16	Buddy Hield* (2)	Oklahoma	SG	Senior	
2016–17	Frank Mason III*	Kansas	PG	Senior	
2017–18	Devonte' Graham	Kansas	PG	Senior	
2018–19	Jarrett Culver	Texas Tech	SG	Sophomore	
2019–20	Udoka Azubuike	Kansas	C	Senior	
2020–21	Cade Cunningham	Oklahoma State	G	Freshman	
2021–22	Ochai Agbaji	Kansas	SG	Senior	
2022–23	Jalen Wilson	Kansas	F	Junior	
2023–24	Jamal Shead	Houston	PG	Senior	
2024–25	JT Toppin	Texas Tech	PF	Sophomore	
2025–26	Jaden Bradley	Arizona	PG	Senior	

== Winners by school ==
School (year joined)	Winners	Years
Kansas (1996)	12	1997, 1998, 2002, 2003, 2005, 2011, 2012, 2017, 2018, 2020, 2022, 2023
Oklahoma State (1996)	4	2004, 2010, 2013, 2021
Iowa State (1996)	3	2000, 2001, 2014
Oklahoma (1996) (Note: Left the conference in 2024.)	3	2009, 2015, 2016
Texas (1996)	2	2006, 2007
Texas Tech (1996)	2	2019, 2025
Arizona (2024)	1	2026
Houston (2023)	1	2024
Kansas State (1996)	1	2008
Nebraska (1996) (Note: Left the conference in 2011.)	1	1999
Arizona State (2024)	0	—
Baylor (1996)	0	—
BYU (2023)	0	—
Cincinnati (2023)	0	—
Colorado (1996) (Note: Left the conference in 2011, returned in 2024.)	0	—
Missouri (1996) (Note: Left the conference in 2012.)	0	—
TCU (2012)	0	—
Texas A&M (1996)	0	—
UCF (2023)	0	—
Utah (2024)	0	—
West Virginia (2012)	0	—

== See also ==
- Big 12 Conference Men's Basketball Coach of the Year
- Big Eight Conference Men's Basketball Player of the Year – the predecessor to the Big 12 Conference and its players of the year (although the Big 12 does not recognize Big Eight Players of the Year as their own)
- List of All-Big 12 Conference men's basketball teams
