= 1999–2000 Nebraska Cornhuskers men's basketball team =

American college basketball season

1999–2000 Nebraska Cornhuskers men's basketball
- Conference: Big 12 Conference
- Record: 11–19 (4–12 Big 12)
- Head coach: Danny Nee (14th season)
- Home arena: Bob Devaney Sports Center

1999–2000 Big 12 men's basketball standings
	Conf.				Overall
Team	W		L	PCT	W		L	PCT
No. 6 Iowa State †	14	–	2	.875	32	–	5	.865
No. 15 Texas	13	–	3	.813	24	–	9	.727
No. 12 Oklahoma	12	–	4	.750	27	–	7	.794
No. 14 Oklahoma State	12	–	4	.750	27	–	7	.794
Kansas	11	–	5	.688	24	–	10	.706
Missouri	10	–	6	.625	18	–	13	.581
Colorado	7	–	9	.438	18	–	14	.563
Nebraska	4	–	12	.250	11	–	19	.367
Baylor	4	–	12	.250	14	–	15	.483
Texas A&M	4	–	12	.250	8	–	20	.286
Texas Tech	3	–	13	.188	12	–	16	.429
Kansas State	2	–	14	.125	9	–	19	.321
† 2000 Big 12 Tournament winner Rankings from AP poll

The 1999–2000 Nebraska Cornhuskers men's basketball team represented the University of Nebraska–Lincoln during the 1999–2000 college basketball season. Led by head coach Danny Nee, the Cornhuskers competed in the Big Twelve Conference and played their home games at the Bob Devaney Sports Center.

Nebraska finished the season with a 11–19 record. The Cornhuskers were eliminated in the first round of the Big 12 tournament to Baylor 63–55 on March 9, 2000.
