= 1999–2000 Oklahoma State Cowboys basketball team =

American college basketball season

1999–2000 Oklahoma State Cowboys basketball

NCAA tournament, Elite Eight
- Conference: Big 12 Conference

Ranking
- Coaches: No. 6
- AP: No. 14
- Record: 27–7 (12–4 Big 12)
- Head coach: Eddie Sutton (10th season)
- Assistant coaches: Sean Sutton; Kyle Keller (1st season)
- Home arena: Gallagher-Iba Arena (Capacity: 6,381)

1999–2000 Big 12 men's basketball standings
	Conf.				Overall
Team	W		L	PCT	W		L	PCT
No. 6 Iowa State †	14	–	2	.875	32	–	5	.865
No. 15 Texas	13	–	3	.813	24	–	9	.727
No. 12 Oklahoma	12	–	4	.750	27	–	7	.794
No. 14 Oklahoma State	12	–	4	.750	27	–	7	.794
Kansas	11	–	5	.688	24	–	10	.706
Missouri	10	–	6	.625	18	–	13	.581
Colorado	7	–	9	.438	18	–	14	.563
Nebraska	4	–	12	.250	11	–	19	.367
Baylor	4	–	12	.250	14	–	15	.483
Texas A&M	4	–	12	.250	8	–	20	.286
Texas Tech	3	–	13	.188	12	–	16	.429
Kansas State	2	–	14	.125	9	–	19	.321
† 2000 Big 12 Tournament winner Rankings from AP poll

The 1999–2000 Oklahoma State Cowboys basketball team represented Oklahoma State University as a member of the Big 12 Conference during the 1999–2000 NCAA Division I men's basketball season. They were led by 10th-year head coach Eddie Sutton and played their home games at Gallagher-Iba Arena in Stillwater, Oklahoma. They finished the season 27–7, 12–4 in Big 12 play to finish in a tie for third place. The Cowboys lost to Iowa State in the semifinals of the Big 12 tournament. The team received an at-large bid to the NCAA tournament as the No. 3 seed in the East region. Oklahoma State reached the Elite Eight after wins over Hofstra, Pepperdine, and Seton Hall, but lost in the regional final to Florida.

== Roster ==
1999–2000 Oklahoma State Cowboys men's basketball team
Players
Coaches

Pos.	#	Name	Height	Weight	Year	Previous school	Hometown
G	4	Glendon Alexander	6 ft 5 in (1.96 m)	—	Sr	Arkansas	Dallas, Texas
F	12	Fredrik Jonzen	6 ft 10 in (2.08 m)	—	So	Katedralskolan	Uppsala, Sweden
F	30	Brian Montonati	6 ft 9 in (2.06 m)	—	Sr	Fullerton College	Muskegon, Michigan
F	34	Desmond Mason	6 ft 5 in (1.96 m)	215 lb (98 kg)	Sr	Waxahachie	Waxahachie, Texas
G	35	Joe Adkins	6 ft 2 in (1.88 m)	—	Sr	John Marshall	Oklahoma City, Oklahoma
G	44	Doug Gottlieb	6 ft 1 in (1.85 m)	—	Sr	Notre Dame	Milwaukee, Wisconsin

Head coach

- Eddie Sutton

Assistant coach(es)

- Sean Sutton
- Kyle Keller

Legend

- (C) Team captain
- (S) Suspended
- (I) Ineligible
- (W) Walk-on
- Injured
- Current redshirt

== Schedule and results ==
Date time, TV	Rank^{#}	Opponent^{#}	Result	Record	Site city, state
Regular season
Nov 19, 1999*	No. 23	Appalachian State; America’s Youth Classic	W 87–75	1–0	Gallagher-Iba Arena; Stillwater, Oklahoma
Nov 20, 1999*	No. 23	Idaho; America’s Youth Classic	W 81–50	2–0	Gallagher-Iba Arena; Stillwater, Oklahoma
Nov 23, 1999*	No. 21	at Arkansas–Little Rock	W 93–64	3–0	Alltel Arena; North Little Rock, Arkansas
Nov 27, 1999*	No. 21	North Texas	W 103–65	4–0	Gallagher-Iba Arena; Stillwater, Oklahoma
Dec 1, 1999*	No. 21	Wichita State	W 68–56	5–0	Gallagher-Iba Arena; Stillwater, Oklahoma
Dec 4, 1999*	No. 21	UTSA	W 87–66	6–0	Gallagher-Iba Arena; Stillwater, Oklahoma
Dec 12, 1999*	No. 17	San Diego State	W 97–63	7–0	Gallagher-Iba Arena; Stillwater, Oklahoma
Dec 15, 1999*	No. 14	Alcorn State	W 79–53	8–0	Gallagher-Iba Arena; Stillwater, Oklahoma
Dec 18, 1999*	No. 14	at UNLV	W 89–75	9–0	Thomas & Mack Center; Las Vegas, Nevada
Dec 21, 1999*	No. 13	vs. Washington	W 84–72	10–0	KeyArena; Seattle, Washington
Dec 30, 1999*	No. 11	vs. LSU	L 53–63	10–1	New Orleans Arena; New Orleans, Louisiana
Jan 5, 2000	No. 16	Langston	W 125–65	11–1	Gallagher-Iba Arena; Stillwater, Oklahoma
Jan 8, 2000	No. 16	Texas Tech	W 55–47	12–1 (1–0)	Gallagher-Iba Arena; Stillwater, Oklahoma
Jan 15, 2000	No. 14	at Baylor	W 56–41	13–1 (2–0)	Ferrell Center; Waco, Texas
Jan 19, 2000*	No. 12	No. 14 Texas	W 73–65	14–1 (3–0)	Gallagher-Iba Arena; Stillwater, Oklahoma
Jan 22, 2000	No. 12	at Texas A&M	L 59–64	14–2 (3–1)	Reed Arena; College Station, Texas
Jan 26, 2000	No. 15	at Kansas State	W 71–56	15–2 (4–1)	Bramlage Coliseum; Manhattan, Kansas
Jan 30, 2000	No. 15	Baylor	W 67–51	16–2 (5–1)	Gallagher-Iba Arena; Stillwater, Oklahoma
Feb 2, 2000	No. 13	Texas Tech	W 63–59	17–2 (6–1)	Gallagher-Iba Arena; Stillwater, Oklahoma
Feb 5, 2000	No. 13	Texas A&M	W 87–55	18–2 (7–1)	Gallagher-Iba Arena; Stillwater, Oklahoma
Feb 7, 2000	No. 14	No. 20 Kansas	W 86–53	19–2 (8–1)	Gallagher-Iba Arena; Stillwater, Oklahoma
Feb 12, 2000	No. 14	at No. 16 Oklahoma	W 74–71	20–2 (9–1)	Lloyd Noble Center; Norman, Oklahoma
Feb 16, 2000	No. 8	at No. 17 Texas	L 57–68	20–3 (9–2)	Frank Erwin Center; Austin, Texas
Feb 19, 2000	No. 8	Nebraska	W 94–55	21–3 (10–2)	Gallagher-Iba Arena; Stillwater, Oklahoma
Feb 21, 2000	No. 10	at Missouri	W 84–72	22–3 (11–2)	Hearnes Center; Columbia, Missouri
Feb 26, 2000	No. 10	at No. 17 Iowa State	L 61–72	22–4 (11–3)	Hilton Coliseum; Ames, Iowa
Mar 1, 2000	No. 13	Colorado	W 96–60	23–4 (12–3)	Gallagher-Iba Arena; Stillwater, Oklahoma
Mar 4, 2000	No. 13	No. 21 Oklahoma	L 56–59	23–5 (12–4)	Gallagher-Iba Arena; Stillwater, Oklahoma
Big 12 Tournament
Mar 10, 2000*	(4) No. 17	vs. (5) No. 24 Kansas; Quarterfinals	W 77–58	24–5	Kemper Arena; Kansas City, Missouri
Mar 11, 2000*	(4) No. 17	vs. (1) No. 7 Iowa State; Semifinals	L 64–68	24–6	Kemper Arena; Kansas City, Missouri
NCAA Tournament
Mar 17, 2000*	(3 E) No. 14	vs. (14 E) Hofstra; First round	W 86–66	25–6	HSBC Arena; Buffalo, New York
Mar 19, 2000*	(3 E) No. 14	vs. (11 E) Pepperdine; Second Round	W 75–67	26–6	HSBC Arena; Buffalo, New York
Mar 24, 2000*	(3 E) No. 14	vs. (10 E) Seton Hall; East Regional semifinal – Sweet Sixteen	W 68–66	27–6	Carrier Dome; Syracuse, New York
Mar 26, 2000*	(3 E) No. 14	vs. (5 E) No. 13 Florida; East Regional final – Elite Eight	L 65–77	27–7	Carrier Dome; Syracuse, New York
*Non-conference game. ^{#}Rankings from AP poll. (#) Tournament seedings in parentheses. E=East.

== 2000 NBA draft ==
Round	Pick	Player	NBA Team
1	17	Desmond Mason	Seattle SuperSonics
