= 1999–2000 Missouri Tigers men's basketball team =

American college basketball season

1999–2000 Missouri Tigers men's basketball

NCAA tournament, First round
- Conference: Big 12 Conference
- Record: 18–13 (10–6 Big 12)
- Head coach: Quin Snyder (1st season)
- Assistant coaches: Igor Kokoškov (1st season); Tony Harvey (1st season)
- Home arena: Hearnes Center

1999–2000 Big 12 men's basketball standings
	Conf.				Overall
Team	W		L	PCT	W		L	PCT
No. 6 Iowa State †	14	–	2	.875	32	–	5	.865
No. 15 Texas	13	–	3	.813	24	–	9	.727
No. 12 Oklahoma	12	–	4	.750	27	–	7	.794
No. 14 Oklahoma State	12	–	4	.750	27	–	7	.794
Kansas	11	–	5	.688	24	–	10	.706
Missouri	10	–	6	.625	18	–	13	.581
Colorado	7	–	9	.438	18	–	14	.563
Nebraska	4	–	12	.250	11	–	19	.367
Baylor	4	–	12	.250	14	–	15	.483
Texas A&M	4	–	12	.250	8	–	20	.286
Texas Tech	3	–	13	.188	12	–	16	.429
Kansas State	2	–	14	.125	9	–	19	.321
† 2000 Big 12 Tournament winner Rankings from AP poll

The 1999–2000 Missouri Tigers men's basketball team represented the University of Missouri during the 1999–2000 NCAA men's college basketball season. The Tigers were led by first-year head coach Quin Snyder and played their home games at the Hearnes Center in Columbia, Missouri.

== Roster ==
1999–2000 Missouri Tigers men's basketball team
Players
Coaches

Pos.	#	Name	Height	Weight	Year	Hometown
G	5	Keyon Dooling	6 ft 3 in (1.91 m)	—	So
G		Justin Gage	6 ft 6 in (1.98 m)	—	Fr
G		Clarence Gilbert	6 ft 2 in (1.88 m)	—	So
G		Brian Grawer	6 ft 0 in (1.83 m)	—	Jr
F		Jeff Hafer (C)	—	—	Sr
G		Josh Kroenke	6 ft 4 in (1.93 m)	—	Fr
F		Johnnie Parker	6 ft 6 in (1.98 m)	—	Jr
F		Kareem Rush	6 ft 6 in (1.98 m)	—	Fr
C		Pat Schumacher	—	—	So
C		Tajudeen Soyoye	—	—	Jr
F		Kenge Stevenson	—	—	So
F	11	Mark Wampler (C)	—	—	Sr
G		Steve Weaver	—	—	Jr

Head coach

- Quinn Snyder

Assistant coach(es)

- John Hammond
- Tony Harvey
- Igor Kokoškov

Legend

- (C) Team captain
- (S) Suspended
- (I) Ineligible
- (W) Walk-on
- Injured
- Current redshirt

Roster
Last update: 2015-Dec-24

== Schedule ==
Date time, TV	Rank^{#}	Opponent^{#}	Result	Record	Site city, state
Regular season
November 12*		vs. Wisconsin; NABC Classic	L 55–66		Carrier Dome; Syracuse, NY
November 13*		vs. Princeton; NABC Classic	W 51–48		Carrier Dome; Syracuse, NY
November 19*		UNC-Asheville	W 75–69		Hearnes Center; Columbia, MO
November 21*		Western Carolina	W 85–68		Hearnes Center; Columbia, MO
November 27*		Morgan State	W 91–50		Hearnes Center; Columbia, MO
December 1*		SMU	W 63–60		Hearnes Center; Columbia, MO
December 7*		No. 15 Indiana	L 68–73		Hearnes Center; Columbia, MO
December 12*		Saint Louis	L 72–75		Hearnes Center; Columbia, MO
December 18*		Iowa	W 72–61		Hearnes Center; Columbia, MO
December 21*		at No. 15 Illinois	W 78–72		Champaign, IL
December 30*		vs. Kentucky; Sugar Bowl Classic	L 53–70		New Orleans, LA
January 4*		Winthrop	L 46–51		Hearnes Center; Columbia, MO
January 8		at Iowa State	L 81–86		Ames, IA
January 12		Colorado	W 100–86		Hearnes Center; Columbia, MO
January 15		Kansas State	W 73–56		Hearnes Center; Columbia, MO
January 18		at Baylor	W 74–72		Waco, TX
January 22		No. 7 Kansas	W 81–59		Hearnes Center; Columbia, MO
January 29		Texas A&M	W 93–62		Hearnes Center; Columbia, MO
February 2		at Colorado	W 86–81		Boulder, CO
February 5		at Nebraska	W 84–78		Lincoln, NE
February 9		No. 17 Iowa State	L 62–72		Hearnes Center; Columbia, MO
February 12		No. 18 Texas	L 63–66		Hearnes Center; Columbia, MO
February 15		at Texas Tech	W 86–76		Lubbock, TX
February 19		at Kansas State	W 84–74		Manhattan, KS
February 21		No. 8 Oklahoma State	L 72–84		Hearnes Center; Columbia, MO
February 26		at No. 20 Oklahoma	L 56–83		Norman, OK
March 1		Nebraska	W 86–72		Hearnes Center; Columbia, MO
March 5		at No. 23 Kansas	L 82–83		Allen Fieldhouse; Lawrence, KS
Big 12 Tournament
March 9*		vs. Texas Tech; Big 12 tournament	W 80–47		Kemper Arena; Kansas City, MO
March 10*		vs. No. 15 Oklahoma; Big 12 Tournament	L 80–84		Kemper Arena; Kansas City, MO
NCAA Tournament
March 17*		vs. North Carolina; NCAA tournament first round	L 70–84		Birmingham, AL
*Non-conference game. ^{#}Rankings from AP Poll. (#) Tournament seedings in parentheses.
