= 1999–2000 Kansas Jayhawks men's basketball team =

American college basketball season

1999–2000 Kansas Jayhawks men's basketball

Great Alaska Shootout champions

NCAA tournament, Round of 32
- Conference: Big 12 Conference
- North
- Record: 24–10 (11–5 Big 12)
- Head coach: Roy Williams (12th season)
- Assistant coaches: Neil Dougherty (5th season); Jerod Haase (1st season); Joe Holladay (6th season)
- Captains: Nick Bradford; Lester Earl; Ashante Johnson; Terry Nooner
- Home arena: Allen Fieldhouse

1999–2000 Big 12 men's basketball standings
	Conf.				Overall
Team	W		L	PCT	W		L	PCT
No. 6 Iowa State †	14	–	2	.875	32	–	5	.865
No. 15 Texas	13	–	3	.813	24	–	9	.727
No. 12 Oklahoma	12	–	4	.750	27	–	7	.794
No. 14 Oklahoma State	12	–	4	.750	27	–	7	.794
Kansas	11	–	5	.688	24	–	10	.706
Missouri	10	–	6	.625	18	–	13	.581
Colorado	7	–	9	.438	18	–	14	.563
Nebraska	4	–	12	.250	11	–	19	.367
Baylor	4	–	12	.250	14	–	15	.483
Texas A&M	4	–	12	.250	8	–	20	.286
Texas Tech	3	–	13	.188	12	–	16	.429
Kansas State	2	–	14	.125	9	–	19	.321
† 2000 Big 12 Tournament winner Rankings from AP poll

The 1999–2000 Kansas Jayhawks men's basketball team represented the University of Kansas in the 1999–2000 NCAA Division I men's basketball season, which was the Jayhawks' 102nd basketball season. The head coach was Roy Williams, who served his 12th year at KU. The team played its home games in Allen Fieldhouse in Lawrence, Kansas.

== Roster ==
Luke Axtell	33	Guard/forward	6–10	220	Sophomore	Austin, Texas
Jeff Boschee	13	Guard	6–1	185	Sophomore	Valley City, North Dakota
Nick Bradford	21	Forward	6-7	200	Senior	Fayetteville, Arkansas
Jeff Carey	22	Center	6–11	250	Sophomore	Camdenton, Missouri
Eric Chenowith	44	Center	7–1	270	Junior	Orange, California
Nick Collison	4	Forward	6–9	255	Freshman	Iowa Falls, Iowa
Chris Baker	12	Guard	6-0	180	Senior, 5th year transfer	Council Grove, Kansas
Lester Earl	3	Forward	6-8	235	Senior	Baton Rouge, Louisiana
Drew Gooden	0	Forward	6–10	230	Freshman	Richmond, California
Kenny Gregory	20	Guard/forward	6–5	208	Junior	Columbus, Ohio
Kirk Hinrich	10	Guard	6–3	190	Freshman	Sioux City, Iowa
Ashante Johnson	31	Forward	6–8	210	Senior	San Diego, California
Marlon London	24	Guard	6–3	180	Sophomore	Broadview, Illinois
Terry Nooner	5	Guard	6-1	191	Senior	Raytown, Missouri

== Big 12 Conference standings ==
#	Team	Conference	Pct.	Overall	Pct.
1	Iowa State	14–2	.875	32–5	.865
2	Texas	13–3	.813	24–9	.727
3	Oklahoma	12–4	.750	27–7	.794
4	Oklahoma State	12–4	.750	27–7	.794
5	Kansas	11–5	.688	24–10	.706
6	Missouri	10–6	.625	18–13	.581
7	Colorado	7–9	.438	18–14	.563
8	Nebraska	4–12	.250	11–19	.367
9	Baylor	4–12	.250	14–15	.483
10	Texas A&M	4–12	.250	8–20	.286
11	Texas Tech	3–13	.188	12–16	.429
12	Kansas State	2–14	.125	9–19	.321

== Schedule ==
Date time, TV	Rank^{#}	Opponent^{#}	Result	Record	Site city, state
Regular season
11/19/1999*; 8:05PM	No. 11	Fairfield	W 97–71	1–0	Allen Fieldhouse; Lawrence, KS
11/26/1999*	No. 10	vs. Georgia; Great Alaska Shootout	W 88–78	2–0	Sullivan Arena; Anchorage, AK
11/27/1999*	No. 10	vs. Xavier; Great Alaska Shootout	W 111–70	3–0	Sullivan Arena; Anchorage, AK
11/28/1999*	No. 10	vs. Georgia Tech; Great Alaska Shootout	W 84–70	4–0	Sullivan Arena; Anchorage, AK
12/02/1999*; 8:05PM	No. 6	Pepperdine	W 76–61	5–0	Allen Fieldhouse; Lawrence, KS
12/05/1999*; 2:00PM	No. 6	at Middle Tennessee State	W 97–77	6–0	Murphy Center; Murfressboro, TN
12/07/1999*; 7:00PM	No. 5	vs. No. 4 Michigan State; Great Eight	L 54–66	6–1	United Center (13,127); Chicago, IL
12/11/1999*; 8:05PM	No. 5	Pittsburg	W 96–71	7–1	Allen Fieldhouse; Lawnrence, KS
12/16/1999*; 9:00PM	No. 8	No. 12 Ohio State	W 80–67	8–1	Allen Fieldhouse; Lawrence, KS
12/18/1999*; 12:00PM	No. 8	vs. No. 20 Illinois	L 70–84	8–2	United Center; Chicago, IL
12/22/1999*; 8:05PM	No. 12	at Princeton	W 82–67	9–2	Allen Fieldhouse; Lawrence, KS
12/30/1999*; 9:05PM	No. 10	Saint Louis; Sprint Shootout	W 71–60	10–2	Kemper Arena; Kansas City, MO
1/4/2000; 8:05PM	No. 9	Penn	W 105–59	11–2	Allen Fieldhouse; Lawrence, KS
1/8/2000; 9:00PM	No. 9	at Colorado	W 84–69	12–2	Coors Events Center; Boulder, CO
1/12/2000; 9:05PM	No. 8	Kansas State; Sunflower Showdown	W 87–79	13–2	Allen Fieldhouse; Lawrence, KS
1/15/2000; 9:05PM	No. 8	Nebraska	W 97–82	14–2	Allen Fieldhouse; Lawrence, KS
1/17/2000; 9:0rPM	No. 7	at Texas A&M	W 78–57	15–2	Reed Arena; College Station, TX
1/22/2000; 1:00PM	No. 7	at Missouri; Border War (Kansas-Missouri rivalry)	L 59–81	15–3	Hearnes Center; Columbia, MO
1/24/2000; 9:05PM	No. 7	Colorado	W 89–74	16–3	Allen Fieldhouse; Lawrence, KS
1/29/2000; 4:00PM	No. 12	at Iowa State	L 66–74	16–4	Hilton Coliseum; Ames, IA
2/3/2000*; 7:00PM	No. 15	at Iowa	L 69–77	16–5	Carver-Hawkeye Arena; Iowa City, IA
2/5/2000; 4:00PM	No. 15	Texas Tech	W 87–62	17–5	Allen Fieldhouse; Lawrence, KS
2/7/2000; 9:00PM	No. 15	at No. 14 Oklahoma State	L 53–86	17–6	Gallagher-Iba Arena; Stillwater, OK
2/12/2000; 4:00PM	No. 20	at Kansas State; Sunflower Showdown	W 94–65	18–6	Bramlage Coliseum; Manhattan, KS
2/15/2000; 9:05PM	No. 24	No. 14 Iowa State	L 62–64	18–7	Allen Fieldhouse; Lawrence, KS
2/20/2000; 1:30PM	No. 24	No. 20 Oklahoma	W 53–50	19–7	Allen Fieldhouse; Lawrence, KS
2/23/2000; 9:05PM	No. 23	at Nebraska	W 83–58	20–7	Bob Devaney Sports Center; Lincoln, NE
2/26/2000; 8:05PM	No. 23	Baylor	W 80–70	21–7	Allen Fieldhouse; Lawrence, KS
2/28/2000; 9:00PM	No. 23	at No. 16 Texas	L 54–68	21–8	Frank Erwin Center; Austin, TX
3/5/2000; 2:00PM	No. 23	Missouri; Border War	W 83–82	22–8	Allen Fieldhouse; Lawrence, KS
Big 12 Tournament
3/9/2000; 3:20PM	No. 24	vs. Kansas State; First Round; Sunflower Showdown	W 84–60	23–8	Kemper Arena; Kansas City, MO
3/10/2000; 3:20PM	No. 24	vs. No. 17 Oklahoma State; Quarterfinals	L 58–77	23–9	Kemper Arena; Kansas City, MO
NCAA tournament
3/17/2000*; 7:40PM	No. (8)	vs. (9) DePaul; First Round	W 81–77 ^{OT}	24–9	Lawrence Joel Veterans Memorial Coliseum; Winston-Salem, NC
3/19/2000*; 5:00PM	No. (8)	vs. No. 1 (1) Duke; Second Round	L 64–69	24–10	Lawrence Joel Veterans Memorial Coliseum; Winston-Salem, NC
*Non-conference game. ^{#}Rankings from AP Poll, NCAA tournament seeds shown in parentheses. (#) Tournament seedings in parentheses. All times are in Central Standard Time.

== Rankings ==
Poll	Pre	Wk 1	Wk 2	Wk 3	Wk 4	Wk 5	Wk 6	Wk 7	Wk 8	Wk 9	Wk 10	Wk 11	Wk 12	Wk 13	Wk 14	Wk 15	Wk 16	Wk 17	Wk 18
AP	11	11	10	6	5	8	12	10	9	8	7	12	15	20	24	23	23	24	
Coaches																			

*There was no coaches poll in week 1.
