= 1999–2000 Oklahoma Sooners men's basketball team =

American college basketball season

1999–2000 Oklahoma Sooners men's basketball

NCAA tournament, second round
- Conference: Big 12 Conference

Ranking
- Coaches: No. 19
- AP: No. 12
- Record: 27–7 (12–4 Big 12)
- Head coach: Kelvin Sampson (6th season)
- Home arena: Lloyd Noble Center (Capacity: 10,871)

1999–2000 Big 12 men's basketball standings
| | Conf. | | | | Overall |
| Team | W | | L | PCT | W | | L | PCT |
|---|---|---|---|---|---|---|---|---|
| No. 6 Iowa State † | 14 | – | 2 | .875 | 32 | – | 5 | .865 |
| No. 15 Texas | 13 | – | 3 | .813 | 24 | – | 9 | .727 |
| No. 12 Oklahoma | 12 | – | 4 | .750 | 27 | – | 7 | .794 |
| No. 14 Oklahoma State | 12 | – | 4 | .750 | 27 | – | 7 | .794 |
| Kansas | 11 | – | 5 | .688 | 24 | – | 10 | .706 |
| Missouri | 10 | – | 6 | .625 | 18 | – | 13 | .581 |
| Colorado | 7 | – | 9 | .438 | 18 | – | 14 | .563 |
| Nebraska | 4 | – | 12 | .250 | 11 | – | 19 | .367 |
| Baylor | 4 | – | 12 | .250 | 14 | – | 15 | .483 |
| Texas A&M | 4 | – | 12 | .250 | 8 | – | 20 | .286 |
| Texas Tech | 3 | – | 13 | .188 | 12 | – | 16 | .429 |
| Kansas State | 2 | – | 14 | .125 | 9 | – | 19 | .321 |
† 2000 Big 12 Tournament winner Rankings from AP poll

The 1999–2000 Oklahoma Sooners men's basketball team represented the University of Oklahoma in competitive college basketball during the 1999–2000 NCAA Division I men's basketball season. The Oklahoma Sooners men's basketball team played its home games in the Lloyd Noble Center and was a member of the National Collegiate Athletic Association's Big 12 Conference.

The team posted a 27–7 overall record (12–4 Big 12), and the Sooners received a bid to the 2000 NCAA tournament as No. 3 seed in the West region. After an opening round win over Winthrop, the Sooners lost to No. 6 seed Purdue, 66–62.

== Roster ==
1999–2000 Oklahoma Sooners men's basketball team
Players
Coaches

| Pos. | # | Name | Height | Weight | Year | Previous school | Hometown |
|---|---|---|---|---|---|---|---|
| G | 10 | Hollis Price | 6 ft 1 in (1.85 m) | 160 lb (73 kg) | Fr | St. Augustine | New Orleans, Louisiana |
| G | 11 | J. R. Raymond | 6 ft 2 in (1.88 m) | 175 lb (79 kg) | Sr | | Gastonia, North Carolina |
| G | 21 | Eduardo Nájera | 6 ft 8 in (2.03 m) | 240 lb (109 kg) | Sr | Cornerstone Christian Academy |

Head coach

- Kelvin Sampson

Assistant coach(es)

Legend

- (C) Team captain
- (S) Suspended
- (I) Ineligible
- (W) Walk-on
- Injured
- Current redshirt

Roster

== Schedule and results ==
| Date time, TV | Rank^{#} | Opponent^{#} | Result | Record | Site (attendance) city, state |
Non-conference regular season
| Nov 19, 1999* | | vs. Montana State | W 91–76 | 1–0 | Carlson Center; Fairbanks, Alaska |
| Nov 20, 1999* | | vs. George Washington | W 73–54 | 2–0 | Carlson Center; Fairbanks, Alaska |
| Nov 21, 1999* | | vs. California | W 75–58 | 3–0 | Carlson Center; Fairbanks, Alaska |
| Nov 26, 1999* | | San Diego; Sooner Holiday Classic | W 68–61 | 4–0 | Lloyd Noble Center; Norman, Oklahoma |
| Nov 27, 1999* | | UC Irvine; Sooner Holiday Classic | W 80–68 | 5–0 | Lloyd Noble Center; Norman, Oklahoma |
| Dec 4, 1999* | | Ole Miss | W 81–73 | 6–0 | Lloyd Noble Center; Norman, Oklahoma |
| Dec 7, 1999* | | at Arkansas | W 66–52 | 7–0 | Bud Walton Arena; Fayetteville, Arkansas |
| Dec 11, 1999* | | Arkansas-Little Rock | W 80–56 | 8–0 | Lloyd Noble Center; Norman, Oklahoma |
| Dec 18, 1999* | No. 23 | Georgia Southern | W 102–63 | 9–0 | Lloyd Noble Center; Norman, Oklahoma |
| Dec 22, 1999* | No. 21 | No. 4 Cincinnati | L 57–72 | 9–1 | Lloyd Noble Center; Norman, Oklahoma |
| Dec 29, 1999* | No. 22 | vs. Mount St. Mary's; All-College Tournament | W 94–41 | 10–1 | Myriad Convention Center; Oklahoma City, Oklahoma |
| Dec 30, 1999* | No. 22 | vs. Arkansas State; All-College Tournament | W 64–51 | 11–1 | Myriad Convention Center; Oklahoma City, Oklahoma |
| Jan 3, 2000* | No. 20 | Lamar | W 67–63 | 12–1 | Lloyd Noble Center; Norman, Oklahoma |
Big 12 Regular Season
| Jan 8, 2000 | No. 20 | Texas A&M | W 78–53 | 13–1 (1–0) | Lloyd Noble Center; Norman, Oklahoma |
| Jan 11, 2000 | No. 16 | Baylor | W 76–43 | 14–1 (2–0) | Lloyd Noble Center; Norman, Oklahoma |
| Jan 15, 2000 | No. 16 | at No. 15 Texas | L 66–79 | 14–2 (2–1) | Frank Erwin Center; Austin, Texas |
| Jan 19, 2000 | No. 17 | at Colorado | L 80–88 | 14–3 (2–2) | Coors Events/Conference Center; Boulder, Colorado |
| Jan 22, 2000 | No. 17 | Iowa State | W 80–75 ^{2OT} | 15–3 (3–2) | Lloyd Noble Center; Norman, Oklahoma |
| Jan 29, 2000 | No. 18 | at Texas Tech | W 78–61 | 16–3 (4–2) | United Spirit Arena; Lubbock, Texas |
| Jan 31, 2000 | No. 18 | No. 16 Texas | W 83–59 | 17–3 (5–2) | Lloyd Noble Center; Norman, Oklahoma |
| Feb 5, 2000 | No. 18 | at Baylor | W 68–59 | 18–3 (6–2) | Ferrell Center; Waco, Texas |
| Feb 8, 2000 | No. 16 | Kansas State | W 85–64 | 19–3 (7–2) | Lloyd Noble Center; Norman, Oklahoma |
| Feb 12, 2000 | No. 16 | No. 14 Oklahoma State | L 71–74 | 19–4 (7–3) | Lloyd Noble Center; Norman, Oklahoma |
| Feb 14, 2000 | No. 20 | at Nebraska | W 62–54 | 20–4 (8–3) | Bob Devaney Sports Center; Lincoln, Nebraska |
| Feb 20, 2000 | No. 20 | at No. 24 Kansas | L 50–53 | 20–5 (8–4) | Allen Fieldhouse; Lawrence, Kansas |
| Feb 23, 2000 | No. 20 | Texas Tech | W 93–65 | 21–5 (9–4) | Lloyd Noble Center; Norman, Oklahoma |
| Feb 26, 2000 | No. 20 | Missouri | W 83–56 | 22–5 (10–4) | Lloyd Noble Center; Norman, Oklahoma |
| Mar 1, 2000 | No. 21 | at Texas A&M | W 77–59 | 23–5 (11–4) | Reed Arena; College Station, Texas |
| Mar 4, 2000 | No. 21 | at No. 13 Oklahoma State | W 59–56 | 24–5 (12–4) | Gallagher-Iba Arena; Stillwater, Oklahoma |
Big 12 Tournament
| Mar 10, 2000* | No. 15 | vs. Missouri; Quarterfinals | W 84–80 ^{OT} | 25–5 | Kemper Arena; Kansas City, Missouri |
| Mar 11, 2000* | No. 15 | vs. No. 13 Texas; Semifinals | W 81–65 | 26–5 | Kemper Arena; Kansas City, Missouri |
| Mar 12, 2000* | No. 15 | vs. No. 7 Iowa State; Championship Game | L 58–70 | 26–6 | Kemper Arena; Kansas City, Missouri |
NCAA Tournament
| Mar 16, 2000* | (3 W) No. 12 | vs. (14 W) Winthrop; First Round | W 74–50 | 27–6 | McKale Center; Tucson, Arizona |
| Mar 18, 2000* | (3 W) No. 12 | vs. (6 W) No. 25 Purdue; Second Round | L 62–66 | 27–7 | McKale Center; Tucson, Arizona |
*Non-conference game. ^{#}Rankings from AP Poll. (#) Tournament seedings in parentheses. All times are in Central Time. (#) during NCAA Tournament is seed within region W=West.

== NBA draft selections ==
| Round | Pick | Player | NBA club |
|---|---|---|---|
| 2 | 38 | Eduardo Nájera | Dallas Mavericks |
