= Big 12 Conference men's basketball =

American college basketball conference

Big 12 Logo

The Big 12 Conference is a group of 16 (originally 12) universities which compete in the NCAA Division I level. The conference was formed in 1994 but did not begin conference play until the fall of 1996. The schools that composed the Big 12 Conference in the most recent 2022–23 season, except West Virginia, were members of either the Big Eight Conference or the Southwest Conference, and have won six national titles including three titles since the inception of the Big 12 Conference.

The conference expanded to 16 members in the 2024–25 season with the return of charter-member Colorado, and the arrival of Arizona, Arizona State, and Utah.

== Membership ==
=== Current members ===
Institution	Location	Founded	Joined	Type	Enrollment	Nickname	Colors
University of Arizona	Tucson, Arizona	1885	2024	Public	51,134	Wildcats	
Arizona State University	Tempe, Arizona (Note: Tempe hosts the main campus and university administration. ASU has three other physical campuses in the Phoenix metropolitan area.)	1885	2024	Public	57,588 (Note: Enrollment at the main Tempe campus. Total on-campus enrollment is 80,065, and total enrollment including online students is 142,616.)	Sun Devils	
Baylor University	Waco, Texas	1845	1996	Private	16,787	Bears	
Brigham Young University (BYU)	Provo, Utah	1875	2023	Private	34,737	Cougars	
University of Central Florida (UCF)	Orlando, Florida	1963	2023	Public	71,948	Knights	
University of Colorado Boulder	Boulder, Colorado	1876	1996; 2024	Public	27,010	Buffaloes	
University of Cincinnati	Cincinnati, Ohio	1819	2023	Public	46,719	Bearcats	
University of Houston	Houston, Texas	1927	2023	Public	47,090	Cougars	
Iowa State University	Ames, Iowa	1858	1996	Public	36,660	Cyclones	
University of Kansas	Lawrence, Kansas	1865	1996	Public	28,091	Jayhawks	
Kansas State University	Manhattan, Kansas	1863	1996	Public	23,779	Wildcats	
Oklahoma State University	Stillwater, Oklahoma	1890	1996	Public	23,459	Cowboys (Note: Oklahoma State uses "Cowboys" for men's teams and "Cowgirls" for women's teams.)	
Texas Christian University (TCU)	Fort Worth, Texas	1873	2012	Private	10,394	Horned Frogs	
Texas Tech University	Lubbock, Texas	1923	1996	Public	38,246	Red Raiders (Note: Texas Tech uses "Red Raiders" for all men's teams and some women's teams, with women's basketball using "Lady Raiders".)	
University of Utah	Salt Lake City, Utah	1850	2024	Public	34,900	Utes	
West Virginia University	Morgantown, West Virginia	1867	2012	Public	29,933	Mountaineers	

=== Former members ===
Institution	Location	Founded	Left	Current Conference	Type	Enrollment	Nickname	Colors
University of Missouri	Columbia, Missouri	1839	2012	SEC	Public	32,777	Tigers	
University of Nebraska–Lincoln	Lincoln, Nebraska	1869	2011	Big Ten	Public	25,260	Cornhuskers	
University of Oklahoma	Norman, Oklahoma	1890	2024	SEC	Public	30,824	Sooners	
University of Texas at Austin (Texas)	Austin, Texas	1883	2024	SEC	Public	50,950	Longhorns	
Texas A&M University	College Station, Texas	1876	2012	SEC	Public	60,435	Aggies	

== Standings ==
=== All-time records ===
Team	Big 12 Record	Big 12 Winning %	Overall record	Overall Winning %	Big 12 Regular season Championships	Big 12 Tournament Record	Big 12 tournament championships
Arizona	30–8	.789	1918–992–1	.659	1	5–1	1
Arizona State	11–27	.289	1498–1339	.528	-	1–2	-
Baylor	238–270	.469	1515–1439	.513	2	19–27	-
BYU	33–23	.589	1941–1166	.625	-	4–3	-
UCF	23–33	.411	915–716	.561	-	3–3	-
Cincinnati	23–33	.411	1948–1110	.637	-	4–3	-
Colorado	105–173	.378	1457–1308	.527	-	11–17	-
Houston	48–8	.857	1496–892	.626	2	7–2	1
Iowa State	240–272	.469	1512–1415	.517	2	27–24	6
Kansas	403–109	.787	2437–919	.726	21	51–16	12
Kansas State	215–277	.437	1768–1275	.581	2	19–29	-
Oklahoma State	250–262	.488	1784–1281	.582	1	29–26	2
TCU	88–164	.349	1357–1503	.474	-	9–14	-
Texas Tech	223–288	.436	1564–1199	.566	1	18–29	-
Utah	10–28	.263	1924–1123	.631	-	0–2	-
West Virginia	120–133	.474	1892–1202	.612	-	10–12	-

Totals though the end of the 2025−26 Big 12 Tournament.

=== Overall series records in Big 12 Play ===
1997−2026 as Big 12 Members

	vs. Arizona	vs. Arizona State	vs. Baylor	vs. BYU	vs. UCF	vs. Cincinnati	vs. Colorado	vs. Houston	vs. Iowa State	vs. Kansas	vs. Kansas State	vs. Oklahoma State	vs. TCU	vs. Texas Tech	vs. Utah	vs. West Virginia	Total
Arizona	—	4–0	3–0	3–1	2–0	3–0	1–0	1–1	2–1	1–2	1–1	2–0	2–0	1–2	2–0	2–0	30–8
Arizona State	0–4	—	1–2	0–3	0–2	1–1	2–2	0–2	0–3	1–1	2–1	1–1	1–2	0–2	2–1	1–1	11–27
Baylor	0–3	2–0	—	1–3	3–0	2–2	7–10	0–5	23–20	9–34	23–19	30–27	18–8	31–27	3–0	17–7	238–270
BYU	1–3	2–0	3–1	—	3–1	1–3	2–0	0–3	3–1	2–1	3–1	2–2	2–1	1–3	3–1	3–1	33–23
UCF	0–2	2–0	0–3	1–3	—	1–4	2–1	0–4	0–4	2–2	2–1	2–3	3–1	3–1	2–0	1–4	23–33
Cincinnati	0–2	1–1	2–2	3–1	4–1	—	2–0	0–5	1–2	1–2	2–2	1–2	2–2	1–2	2–1	1–5	23–33
Colorado	0–2	2–2	10–7	0–2	1–2	0–2	—	0–2	14–19	1–32	16–16	8–9	2–1	9–9	2–1	0–2	105–173
Houston	1–1	2–0	5–0	3–0	4–0	5–0	2–0	—	2–2	3–2	3–0	4–0	2–1	3–2	2–0	4–0	48–8
Iowa State	1–2	2–0	20–23	1–3	4–0	2–1	19–14	2–2	—	16–43	29–30	20–23	16–10	21–21	2–0	10–15	240–270
Kansas	2–1	1–1	34–9	1–2	2–2	2–1	32–1	2–3	43–16	—	51–9	32–11	22–3	33–9	1–1	16–9	403–109
Kansas State	1–1	1–2	19–23	1–3	1–2	2–2	16–16	0–3	30–29	9–51	—	18–26	14–12	18–24	1–1	13–14	224–288
Oklahoma State	0–2	1–1	27–30	2–2	3–2	2–1	9–8	0–4	23–20	11–32	26–18	—	12–14	35–24	2–1	13–12	250–262
TCU	1–2	1–0	8–18	1–1	2–2	1–3	1–2	1–2	10–16	3–22	12–14	14–12	—	10–16	0–2	9–18	88–165
Texas Tech	2–1	2–1	27–31	3–1	1–3	2–1	9–9	2–3	21–21	9–33	24–18	24–35	16–10	—	2–0	11–14	223–288
Utah	0–2	1–2	0–3	1–3	0–2	1–2	1–2	0–2	0–2	1–1	1–1	1–2	1–0	1–2	—	1–2	10–28
West Virginia	0–2	1–1	7–17	1–3	4–1	5–1	2–0	0–4	15–10	9–16	14–13	12–13	18–9	14–11	2–1	—	120–133

Totals though the end of the 2026–27 season. Includes any regular season match up regardless of conference affiliation or postseason meetings.

=== All Time Series Record ===
Totals from though the end of the 2024–25 season.
Includes any regular season match up regardless of conference affiliation or postseason meetings.

	vs. Arizona	vs. Arizona State	vs. Baylor	vs. BYU	vs. UCF	vs. Cincinnati	vs. Colorado	vs. Houston	vs. Iowa State	vs. Kansas	vs. Kansas State	vs. Oklahoma State	vs. TCU	vs. Texas Tech	vs. Utah	vs. West Virginia	Total
Arizona	—	163–87	5–7	21–20	1–0	5–0	27–16	6–8	5–4	5–9	6–9	4–0	2–2	26–29	41–32	4–3	321–226
Arizona State	87–163	—	2–8	22–30	0–1	1–3	14–16	3–4	2–2	6–6	6–6	3–6	2–4	19–24	28–38	1–0	186–311
Baylor	5–7	8–2	—	6–7	2–0	2–1	12–16	16–41	25–25	11–37	27–26	38–57	110–90	65–85	2–3	18–8	346–406
BYU	20–21	30–22	7–6	—	4–0	3–3	7–17	3–8	3–7	3–4	5–5	6–4	20–4	3–4	135–130	3–2	253–236
UCF	0–1	1–0	0–2	0–4	—	6–18	2–2	11–25	0–3	1–3	1–3	4–1	2–2	1–2	3–0	1–3	33–67
Cincinnati	0–5	3–1	1–2	3–3	18–6	—	8–1	33–17	4–5	5–5	8–3	3–5	7–1	2–1	4–2	12–13	127–92
Colorado	16–27	16–14	16–12	17–7	2–2	1–8	—	3–5	78–73	40–126	48–97	61–49	4–3	13–19	12–19	1–1	329–461
Houston	6–8	4–3	41–16	8–3	25–11	17–33	5–3	—	5–5	5–6	5–5	10–13	51–26	32–28	1–1	3–0	221–159
Iowa State	4–5	2–2	25–25	7–3	3–0	5–4	73–78	5–5	—	69–191	95–147	68–72	18–15	24–22	2–2	10–15	410–586
Kansas	9–5	6–6	37–11	4–3	3–1	5–5	126–40	6–5	191–69	—	206–97	126–60	27–4	43–9	2–1	27–8	818–324
Kansas State	9–6	6–6	26–27	5–5	3–1	3–8	97–48	5–5	147–95	97–206	—	88–60	21–14	26–26	2–2	13–16	551–525
Oklahoma State	0–4	6–3	57–38	4–6	1–4	5–3	49–61	13–10	72–68	60–126	60–88	—	29–15	50–28	5–2	13–13	425–471
TCU	2–2	4–2	90–110	4–20	2–2	1–7	3–4	26–51	15–18	4–27	14–21	15–29	—	57–88	16–7	8–19	260–406
Texas Tech	29–26	24–19	85–65	4–3	2–1	1–2	19–13	28–32	22–24	9–43	26–26	28–50	88–57	—	3–5	11–18	379–384
Utah	32–44	38–28	3–2	130–135	0–3	2–4	19–12	1–1	2–2	1–2	2–2	2–5	7–16	5–3	—	6–2	249–259
West Virginia	3–4	0–1	8–18	2–3	3–1	13–12	1–1	0–3	15–10	8–27	16–13	13–13	19–8	18–11	2–6	—	120–132

Totals though the end of the 2024–25 season. Includes any regular season match up regardless of conference affiliation or postseason meetings.

== Conference tournament ==
Year	Champion	Runner-up	Most Valuable Player	Location
1997	(1) Kansas 87	(10) Missouri 60	Paul Pierce (1), Kansas	Kemper Arena - Kansas City, MO
1998	(1) Kansas 72	(3) Oklahoma 58	Paul Pierce (2), Kansas	Kemper Arena - Kansas City, MO
1999	(3) Kansas 53	(5) Oklahoma State 37	Jeff Boschee, Kansas	Kemper Arena - Kansas City, MO
2000	(1) Iowa State 70	(3) Oklahoma 58	Marcus Fizer, Iowa State	Kemper Arena - Kansas City, MO
2001	(3) Oklahoma 54	(4) Texas 45	Nolan Johnson, Oklahoma	Kemper Arena - Kansas City, MO
2002	(2) Oklahoma 64	(1) Kansas 55	Hollis Price (1), Oklahoma	Kemper Arena - Kansas City, MO
2003	(3) Oklahoma 49	(5) Missouri 47	Hollis Price (2), Oklahoma	American Airlines Center - Dallas, TX
2004	(1) Oklahoma State 65	(2) Texas 49	Tony Allen, Oklahoma State	American Airlines Center - Dallas, TX
2005	(3) Oklahoma State 72	(4) Texas Tech 68	Joey Graham, Oklahoma State	Kemper Arena - Kansas City, MO
2006	(2) Kansas 80	(1) Texas 68	Mario Chalmers, Kansas	American Airlines Center - Dallas, TX
2007†	(1) Kansas 88	(3) Texas 84	Kevin Durant, Texas	Ford Center - Oklahoma City, OK
2008	(2) Kansas 84	(1) Texas 74	Brandon Rush, Kansas	Sprint Center - Kansas City, MO
2009	(3) Missouri 73	(9) Baylor 60	DeMarre Carroll, Missouri	Ford Center - Oklahoma City, OK
2010	(1) Kansas 72	(2) Kansas State 64	Sherron Collins, Kansas	Sprint Center - Kansas City, MO
2011	(1) Kansas 85	(2) Texas 73	Marcus Morris, Kansas	Sprint Center - Kansas City, MO
2012	(2) Missouri 90	(4) Baylor 75	Kim English, Missouri	Sprint Center - Kansas City, MO
2013	(1) Kansas 70	(2) Kansas State 54	Jeff Withey, Kansas	Sprint Center - Kansas City, MO
2014	(4) Iowa State 74	(7) Baylor 65	DeAndre Kane, Iowa State	Sprint Center - Kansas City, MO
2015	(2) Iowa State 70	(1) Kansas 66	Georges Niang, Iowa State	Sprint Center - Kansas City, MO
2016	(1) Kansas 81	(2) West Virginia 71	Devonte' Graham, Kansas	Sprint Center - Kansas City, MO
2017	(4) Iowa State 80	(2) West Virginia 74	Monté Morris, Iowa State	Sprint Center - Kansas City, MO
2018	(1) Kansas 81 ‡	(3) West Virginia 70	Malik Newman, Kansas	Sprint Center - Kansas City, MO
2019	(5) Iowa State 78	(3) Kansas 66	Marial Shayok, Iowa State	Sprint Center - Kansas City, MO
2020	Canceled after two games due to COVID-19.			Sprint Center - Kansas City, MO
2021	(3) Texas 91	(5) Oklahoma State 86	Matt Coleman III, Texas	T-Mobile Center - Kansas City, MO
2022	(1) Kansas 74	(3) Texas Tech 65	Ochai Agbaji, Kansas	T-Mobile Center - Kansas City, MO
2023	(2) Texas 76	(1) Kansas 56	Dylan Disu, Texas	T-Mobile Center - Kansas City, MO
2024	(2) Iowa State 69	(1) Houston 41	Keshon Gilbert, Iowa State	T-Mobile Center - Kansas City, MO
2025	(1) Houston	(3) Arizona	Emanuel Sharp, Houston	T-Mobile Center - Kansas City, MO
2026	(1) Arizona	(2) Houston	Jaden Bradley, Arizona	
Reference: † – Denotes Each Overtime Played

‡The Kansas Jayhawks tournament win was later vacated by the NCAA due to recruiting violations.

=== Performance by team ===
Through 2025 tournament as of March 14

Teams (# of titles)		1997	1998	1999	2000	2001	2002	2003	2004	2005	2006	2007	2008	2009	2010	2011	2012	2013	2014	2015	2016	2017	2018	2019	2020*	2021	2022	2023	2024	2025	2026
Big 12 (28)		(12)	(12)	(12)	(12)	(12)	(12)	(12)	(11)	(12)	(12)	(12)	(12)	(12)	(12)	(12)	(10)	(10)	(10)	(10)	(10)	(10)	(10)	(10)	(10)	(10)	(9)	(10)	(14)	(16)	(16)
1	Kansas (11)	C	C	C	QF	SF	F	SF	SF	SF	C	C	C	QF	C	C	SF	C	SF	F	C	QF	V	F	QF	SF	C	F	2R	QF	SF
2	Iowa State (6)	SF	1R	1R	C	QF	1R	QF	QF	QF	1R	1R	1R	1R	1R	1R	QF	SF	C	C	QF	C	1R	C	1R	1R	QF	SF	C	QF	SF
6	Oklahoma State (2)	QF	QF	F	SF	QF	QF	QF	C	C	QF	SF	QF	SF	QF	QF	QF	SF	QF	QF	1R	QF	QF	1R	QF	F	•	QF	1R	1R	2R
7	Arizona (0)																													F	C
8	Arizona State (0)																													1R	2R
9	Baylor (0)	1R	QF	1R	QF	SF	1R	1R	•	1R	1R	QF	1R	F	SF	1R	F	QF	F	SF	SF	QF	QF	QF	QF	SF	QF	QF	SF	QF	1R
10	BYU (0)																												QF	SF	QF
11	UCF (0)																												2R	2R	QF
12	Cincinnati (0)																												QF	2R	2R
13	Colorado (0)	QF	1R	QF	QF	1R	QF	QF	QF	QF	QF	1R	QF	1R	1R	SF														QF	1R
14	Houston (1)																												F	C	F
15	Kansas State (0)	1R	QF	SF	1R	QF	QF	1R	1R	QF	1R	SF	QF	QF	F	QF	QF	F	QF	1R	QF	SF	SF	SF	QF	QF	1R	QF	QF	2R	1R
17	TCU (0)																	1R	1R	QF	QF	SF	QF	QF	1R	1R	SF	SF	QF	1R	QF
19	Texas Tech (0)	QF	1R	1R	1R	1R	SF	SF	SF	F	QF	QF	1R	QF	QF	1R	1R	QF	1R	1R	1R	1R	SF	QF	QF	QF	F	1R	SF	SF	QF
20	Utah (0)																													1R	1R
21	West Virginia (0)																	1R	QF	QF	F	F	F	SF	QF	QF	QF	QF	1R	2R	2R
No Longer Members of the Big 12
3	Oklahoma (3)	SF	F	QF	F	C	C	C	QF	SF	QF	QF	SF	QF	1R	QF	1R	QF	QF	SF	SF	1R	1R	1R	QF	QF	SF	1R	2R		
4	Texas (2)	QF	SF	SF	SF	F	SF	QF	F	1R	F	F	F	SF	QF	F	SF	QF	SF	QF	QF	QF	QF	QF	QF	C	QF	C	2R		
5	Missouri (2)	F	QF	QF	QF	QF	QF	F	QF	QF	1R	1R	1R	C	1R	QF	C														
16	Nebraska (0)	1R	SF	QF	1R	1R	1R	1R	1R	1R	SF	1R	QF	1R	QF	1R															
18	Texas A&M (0)	1R	1R	1R	1R	1R	1R	1R	1R	1R	SF	QF	SF	1R	SF	SF	QF														

Key

C	Champion
F	Runner-up
SF	Semifinals
QF	Quarterfinals
RR	Round Number
•	Did not participate
V	Vacated
	Not Member of Conference

*The 2020 tournament was canceled after the first-round games due to the ongoing COVID-19 pandemic.

== Player of the Year ==
Season	Player	School	Position	Class
1996–97	Raef LaFrentz	Kansas	PF	Junior
1997–98	Raef LaFrentz (2)	Kansas (2)	PF	Senior
1998–99	Venson Hamilton	Nebraska	C	Senior
1999–00	Marcus Fizer	Iowa State	PF	Junior
2000–01	Jamaal Tinsley	Iowa State (2)	PG	Senior
2001–02	Drew Gooden	Kansas (3)	PF	Junior
2002–03	Nick Collison	Kansas (4)	PF	Senior
2003–04	Tony Allen	Oklahoma State	SG	Senior
2004–05	Wayne Simien	Kansas (5)	PF	Senior
2005–06	P. J. Tucker	Texas	SF	Junior
2006–07	Kevin Durant*	Texas	SF	Freshman
2007–08	Michael Beasley	Kansas State	PF	Freshman
2008–09	Blake Griffin*	Oklahoma	PF	Sophomore
2009–10	James Anderson	Oklahoma State (2)	SG	Junior
2010–11	Marcus Morris	Kansas (6)	PF	Junior
2011–12	Thomas Robinson	Kansas (7)	PF	Junior
2012–13	Marcus Smart	Oklahoma State (3)	PG	Freshman
2013–14	Melvin Ejim	Iowa State (3)	SF	Senior
2014–15	Buddy Hield	Oklahoma (2)	SG	Junior
2015–16	Buddy Hield* (2)	Oklahoma (3)	SG	Senior
2016–17	Frank Mason III*	Kansas (8)	PG	Senior
2017–18	Devonte' Graham	Kansas (9)	PG	Senior
2018–19	Jarrett Culver	Texas Tech	SG	Sophomore
2019–20	Udoka Azubuike	Kansas (10)	C	Senior
2020–21	Cade Cunningham	Oklahoma State (4)	G	Freshman
2021–22	Ochai Agbaji	Kansas (11)	G	Senior
2022–23	Jalen Wilson	Kansas (12)	F	Junior
2023–24	Jamal Shead	Houston	G	Senior
2024–25	JT Toppin	Texas Tech	F	Sophomore
2025–26	Jaden Bradley	Arizona	G	Senior

†	Co-Players of the Year
*	Awarded a national Player of the Year award: Helms Foundation College Basketball Player of the Year (1904–05 to 1978–79); UPI College Basketball Player of the Year (1954–55 to 1995–96); Naismith College Player of the Year (1968–69 to present); John R. Wooden Award (1976–77 to present)
Player (X)	Denotes the number of times the player has been awarded the Big 12 Player of the Year award at that point

== NCAA tournament ==
School	Appearances	Wins	Final Fours	Championships
Arizona	40	66	5	1
Arizona State	16	13	0	0
Baylor	17	22	3	1
BYU	33	15	0	0
UCF	6	1	0	0
Cincinnati	33	46	6	2
Colorado	16	13	2	0
Houston	27	42	7	0
Iowa State	25	25	1	0
Kansas	53	112	15	4
Kansas State	32	37	4	0
Oklahoma State	29	39	6	2
TCU	12	6	0	0
Texas Tech	22	20	1	0
Utah	29	38	4	1
West Virginia	31	32	2	0

Totals though the end of the 2025−26 season.

*Texas Tech has appeared in 22 tournaments; however, their 1996 Tournament appearance was vacated by the NCAA, officially giving them 21 tournament appearances.
*Kansas has appeared in 54 tournaments; however, their 2018 Tournament appearance was vacated by the NCAA, officially giving them 53 tournament appearances, 15 final fours and 111 wins.
*Arizona has appeared in 40 tournaments; however, their 1999, 2008, 2017 & 2018 Tournament appearance was vacated by the NCAA, officially giving them 36 tournament appearances and 66 wins.
*Arizona State has appeared in 17 tournaments; however, their 1995 Tournament appearance was vacated by the NCAA, officially giving them 16 tournament appearances, 13 wins.

*Arizona, Arizona State, BYU, UCF, Cincinnati, Houston & Utah totals are while members of other conferences
*Colorado has 6 appearances and 4 wins while a member of other conferences

== Home Court Record (Current Arena) ==
	Wins	Losses	Pct.	Undefeated Seasons
Arizona (McKale Center)	715	125	.851	13
Arizona State (Desert Financial Arena)	566	259	.507	1
Baylor (Foster Pavilion)	32	11	.744	0
BYU (Marriott Center)	636	158	.801	10
UCF (Addition Financial Arena)	222	89	.714	0
Cincinnati (Fifth Third Arena)	487	110	.816	4
Colorado (CU Events Center)	328	298	.524	0
Houston (Fertitta Center)	124	8	.939	2
Iowa State (Hilton Coliseum)	644	210	.754	5
Kansas (Allen Fieldhouse)	888	125	.877	21
Kansas State (Bramlage Coliseum)	458	159	.742	0
Oklahoma State (Gallagher-Iba Arena)	882	271	.765	10
TCU (Schollmaier Arena)	594	332	.641	1
Texas Tech (United Supermarkets Arena)	330	114	.743	1
Utah (Jon M. Huntsman Center)	707	193	.786	7
West Virginia (WVU Coliseum)	641	196	.766	2

Updated through 2025–26 season.
Baylor moved from the Ferrell Center, its home since 1988, to the new Foster Pavilion on January 2, 2024 ending its tenure at the former venue with a 411–171 record (.706). Arizona, Arizona State, BYU, UCF, Cincinnati, Colorado, Houston & Utah are records included as members of another conference.

== Conference by Year ==
Totals highlighted in bold signify a first place/championship finish.

Big 12 Year-By-Year
Year	# Teams	RPI	KenPom	NCAA	NIT	CBI
1997	12	2	5	5	2	
1998	12	6	8	4	2	
1999	12	7	6	5	3	
2000	12	3	5	6	1	
2001	12	6	5	6	1	
2002	12	3	5	6	0	
2003	12	2	2	6	2	
2004	12	4	3	4	5	
2005	12	3	3	6	2	
2006	12	5	6	4	3	
2007	12	7	6	4	2	
2008	12	3	2	**6**	2	0
2009	12	3	3	6	3	0
2010	12	**1**	**1**	7	1	0
2011	12	3	4	5	3	0
2012	10	4	2	6	0	0
2013	10	5	3	5	**1**	1
2014	10	**1**	**1**	7	1	0
2015	10	**1**	**1**	7	0	0
2016	10	**1**	**1**	7	0	0
2017	10	2	**1**	6	**1**	0
2018	10	**1**	**1**	7	2	0
2019	10	**1**	**1**	6	**2**	1
2020	10	2	2	-	-	-
2021	10	**1**	2	**7**	0	0
2022	10	**1**	**1**	**6**	1	0
2023	10	**1**	**1**	7	1	0
2024	14	**1**	**1**	8	3	0
2025	16	3	2	7	1	0
2026	16	**1**	**1**	8	1	–
