= Jamaal Tinsley =

American basketball player (born 1978)

Personal information
- Born: February 28, 1978 (age 48) Brooklyn, New York, U.S.
- Listed height: 6 ft 3 in (1.91 m)
- Listed weight: 188 lb (85 kg)

Career information
- High school: Samuel J. Tilden (Brooklyn, New York)
- College: Mt. San Jacinto (1997–1999); Iowa State (1999–2001)
- NBA draft: 2001: 1st round, 27th overall pick
- Drafted by: Vancouver Grizzlies
- Playing career: 2001–2013
- Position: Point guard
- Number: 11, 10, 6

Career history
- 2001–2009: Indiana Pacers
- 2009–2010: Memphis Grizzlies
- 2011: Los Angeles D-Fenders
- 2011–2013: Utah Jazz

Career highlights
- NBA All-Rookie Second Team (2002); Consensus second-team All-American (2001); Big 12 Player of the Year (2001); First-team All-Big 12 (2001); Second-team All-Big 12 (2000)

Career NBA statistics
- Points: 4,652 (8.5 ppg)
- Rebounds: 1,605 (2.9 rpg)
- Assists: 3,330 (6.1 apg)
- Stats at NBA.com
- Stats at Basketball Reference

Jamaal Lee Tinsley (born February 28, 1978) is an American former professional basketball player in the National Basketball Association (NBA). Tinsley played college basketball for the Iowa State Cyclones. Following his senior year, he was drafted by the Vancouver Grizzlies with the 27th pick of the 2001 NBA draft and was immediately dealt to the Atlanta Hawks, and then to the Indiana Pacers on draft night. Tinsley played 11 seasons in the NBA, primarily with the Pacers, as well as the Grizzlies and Jazz.

== Early years and college career ==
As a teen, Tinsley developed his game playing streetball at New York City's Rucker Park. Tinsley's streetball nickname is "Mel The Abuser". He played junior college ball at Mt. San Jacinto College (MSJC) before breaking onto the national scene in the Big 12 Conference at Iowa State University.

In Tinsley's junior year with the Cyclones, he was named the Big 12 Player of the Year. He led Iowa State to a No. 2 seed in the NCAA Tournament. The team, along with fellow star Marcus Fizer, reached the Elite Eight before losing to eventual champion Michigan State. In his senior year, Tinsley earned first-team All-American honors from the NABC.

== NBA career ==
=== Indiana Pacers (2001–2009) ===
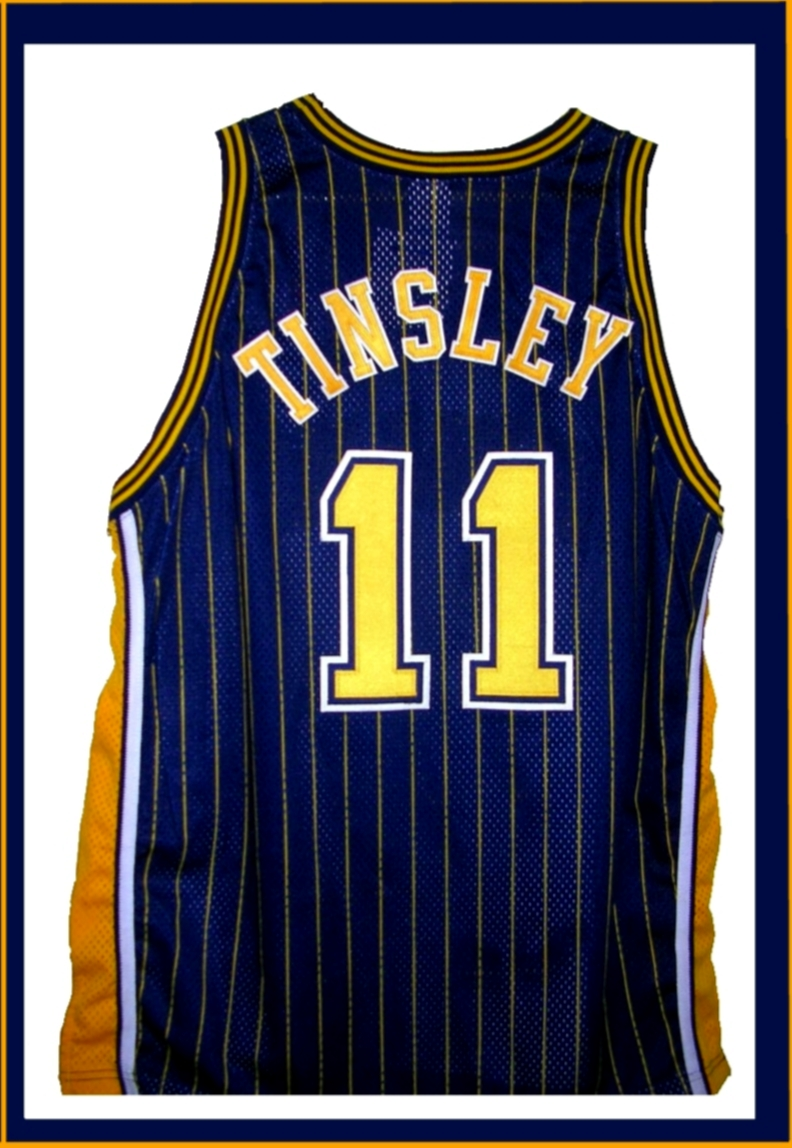
Tinsley wore #11 during his tenure at Iowa State and while with the Indiana Pacers.

Tinsley established himself as the starting point guard under Pacers coach Isiah Thomas. He put up statistics of 9.4 points and 8.1 assists per game in 2001–02. On November 16, 2001, he recorded the 9th five-by-five in the NBA since the 1985–86 season. At 23 years and 261 days, he was the youngest to do so until Andrei Kirilenko in 2003.

Tinsley played 73 games for the Pacers in 2002–03, starting 69 of them, and his averages dipped to 7.8 points and 7.5 assists per contest.

The following year, Rick Carlisle replaced Thomas as the Pacers' head coach, and promoted veteran guard Kenny Anderson to the starting point guard slot, with Anthony Johnson as his backup.

When Anderson and Johnson went down with injuries, Tinsley regained his status as a starter. As the Pacers advanced to the 2004 Eastern Conference Finals, Tinsley started all 16 playoff games.

Tinsley spent the majority of the 2004–05 season on injured reserve due to a bruised left foot, but the team played its way to a 44–38 record and the sixth seed in the Eastern Conference. Tinsley missed the first four games of the Pacers' first-round series against the Boston Celtics, but made a return in a Game 5 victory. In that game on May 3, 2005, Tinsley made seven assists, five steals, and six points, and the five steals tied the most among all players during the 2005 postseason and his personal best for the playoffs. Tinsley's injury problems continued during the 2007–08 season; he only played in 39 games, during which he averaged a career-high 8.4 assists.

For the 2008–09 season, Tinsley was replaced in the starting lineup by point guard T. J. Ford. O'Brien and Pacers' President of Basketball Operations Larry Bird told Tinsley he would not play for the Pacers again and would be traded as soon as possible, then shipped his personal items to Tinsley's home in Atlanta. Tinsley then requested a contract buyout through his agent. Because of the situation where Indiana's insistence on trading and not outright waiving Tinsley meant that no other team offered Indiana anything of value to acquire him (knowing that the Pacers would eventually have to part ways with Tinsley and then he could be picked up at no cost), the NBA Players Association filed a grievance against the Pacers on Tinsley's behalf on February 11, 2009. On July 22, 2009, the Pacers waived Tinsley.

=== Memphis Grizzlies (2009–2010) ===
On November 14, 2009, the Memphis Grizzlies signed Tinsley as a free agent. Chris Wallace, the General Manager of the Grizzlies, stated that he "was the best available player out on the board" and was "a proven commodity as a playmaker" due to his veteran resume in the NBA.

=== Los Angeles D-Fenders (2011) ===
On November 3, 2011, Tinsley was picked 1st overall by the Los Angeles D-Fenders in the NBA Development League Draft. Tinsley played eight games with the D-Fenders and averaged 9.9 points, 3.1 rebounds, and 7.6 assists per game.

=== Utah Jazz (2011–2013) ===
On December 12, 2011, Tinsley was signed by the Utah Jazz, along with Keith McLeod, and Trey Gilder.

On June 29, 2012, the Jazz exercised the team option on Tinsley's contract to keep him under contract for one more season.

On October 26, 2013, he re-signed with the Jazz. He would only play 8 games with the team and on November 12, 2013, he was waived by the Jazz.

== NBA career statistics ==
Legend
GP	Games played	GS	Games started	MPG	Minutes per game
FG%	Field goal percentage	3P%	3-point field goal percentage	FT%	Free throw percentage
RPG	Rebounds per game	APG	Assists per game	SPG	Steals per game
BPG	Blocks per game	PPG	Points per game	**Bold**	Career high

=== Regular season ===
Year	Team	GP	GS	MPG	FG%	3P%	FT%	RPG	APG	SPG	BPG	PPG
2001–02	Indiana	**80**	**78**	30.5	.380	.240	.704	3.7	8.1	1.7	**.5**	9.4
2002–03	Indiana	73	69	30.6	.396	.277	.714	3.6	7.5	1.7	.2	7.8
2003–04	Indiana	52	43	26.5	.414	**.372**	.731	2.6	5.8	1.6	.3	8.3
2004–05	Indiana	40	40	32.5	**.418**	**.372**	.744	**4.0**	6.4	**2.0**	.3	**15.4**
2005–06	Indiana	42	27	26.7	.409	.229	.637	3.2	5.0	1.2	.1	9.3
2006–07	Indiana	72	72	31.2	.389	.316	.720	3.3	6.9	1.6	.3	12.8
2007–08	Indiana	39	36	**33.2**	.380	.284	.720	3.6	**8.4**	1.7	.3	11.9
2009–10	Memphis	38	1	15.5	.371	.179	**.815**	1.7	2.8	.9	.1	3.5
2011–12	Utah	37	1	13.7	.404	.270	.765	1.2	3.3	.5	.2	3.7
2012–13	Utah	66	32	18.5	.368	.307	.692	1.7	4.4	1.0	.2	3.5
2013–14	Utah	8	5	13.8	.200	.067	.000	1.4	2.9	.3	.0	1.1
Career		547	404	26.6	.393	.299	.716	2.9	6.1	1.4	.3	8.5

=== Playoffs ===
Year	Team	GP	GS	MPG	FG%	3P%	FT%	RPG	APG	SPG	BPG	PPG
2002	Indiana	5	5	17.6	.421	.000	.667	2.0	5.0	.4	.0	3.6
2003	Indiana	6	6	**30.8**	**.571**	**.615**	.500	3.0	**6.5**	.7	.0	8.5
2004	Indiana	**16**	**16**	26.4	.398	.296	.938	2.9	5.0	**1.8**	.2	8.1
2005	Indiana	9	9	27.4	.360	.111	.571	**3.3**	5.7	1.6	**.3**	**8.7**
2006	Indiana	1	0	7.0	.333	.000	.000	.0	1.0	1.0	.0	2.0
2012	Utah	4	0	16.3	.250	.000	**1.000**	.5	3.0	.5	.0	3.8
Career		41	36	24.8	.398	.293	.720	2.6	5.1	1.2	.1	7.1

== Others ==
On November 16, 2001, just in his 11th rookie game, Jamaal posted a rare 5 x 5 against the Minnesota Timberwolves, with 12 points, 9 rebounds, 15 assists, 6 steals and 5 blocks.

== See also ==
- List of National Basketball Association players with 20 or more assists in a game
