= Marcus Fizer =

American basketball player (born 1978)

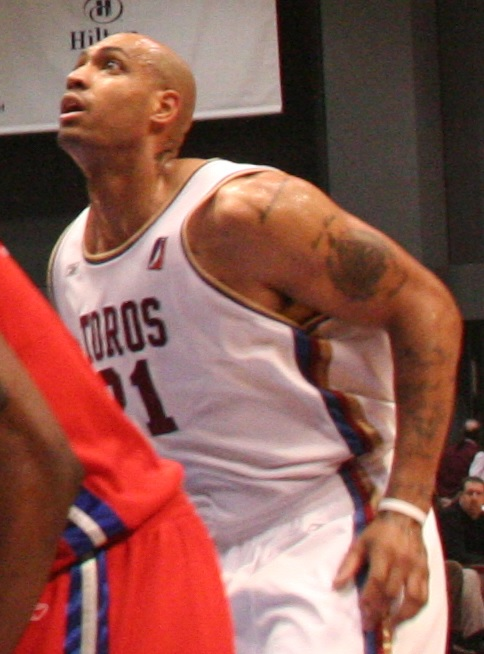
- Fizer with the Austin Toros in 2006

Personal information
- Born: August 10, 1978 (age 48) Inkster, Michigan, U.S.
- Listed height: 6 ft 8 in (2.03 m)
- Listed weight: 265 lb (120 kg)

Career information
- High school: Arcadia (Arcadia, Louisiana)
- College: Iowa State (1997–2000)
- NBA draft: 2000: 1st round, 4th overall pick
- Drafted by: Chicago Bulls
- Playing career: 2000–2015
- Position: Power forward / small forward
- Number: 21

Career history
- 2000–2004: Chicago Bulls
- 2004–2005: Milwaukee Bucks
- 2005–2006: Austin Toros
- 2006: New Orleans/Oklahoma City Hornets
- 2006–2007: Polaris World Murcia
- 2007: Capitanes de Arecibo
- 2007–2009: Maccabi Tel Aviv
- 2009: Capitanes de Arecibo
- 2010: Mets de Guaynabo
- 2011: Taiwan Mobile Clouded Leopards
- 2012: Brujos de Guayama
- 2012: Estudiantes de Bahía Blanca
- 2013–2014: Muharraq
- 2014: Guaros de Lara
- 2014: Barreteros de Zacatecas
- 2015: Defensor Sporting Club

Career highlights
- NBA All-Rookie Second Team (2001); NBA D-League Most Valuable Player (2006); All-NBA D-League First Team (2006); Consensus first-team All-American (2000); Pete Newell Big Man Award (2000); Big 12 Player of the Year (2000); McDonald's All-American (1997); Third-team Parade All-American (1997); Louisiana Mr. Basketball (1997)
- Stats at NBA.com
- Stats at Basketball Reference
Medals
Men's basketball
Representing United States
Goodwill Games
Gold medal – first place	2001 Brisbane	National team

Darnell Marcus Lamar Fizer (born August 10, 1978) is an American former professional basketball player.

== High school career ==
Fizer played high school basketball at Arcadia High School in Arcadia, Louisiana. As a senior, Fizer was selected to play in the McDonald's All-American Game.

== College career ==
Iowa State Cyclones head coach Tim Floyd became aware of Fizer's potential while coaching in Louisiana and interested Fizer in playing collegiate basketball at Iowa State. Fizer became the first McDonald's All-American to play for the Cyclones.

Tim Floyd left Iowa State to coach the Chicago Bulls of the NBA after Fizer's freshman year and was replaced by Larry Eustachy. While playing for both Floyd and Eustachy, Fizer accumulated many Big 12 Conference and national accolades including All-Big 12 honorable mention (freshman), National first-team All-Freshman, first team All-Big 12 (sophomore and junior), Big 12 Player of the Year (junior), Big 12 tournament Most Outstanding Player (junior), and consensus first-team All-America (junior). He led the Big 12 in scoring his sophomore and junior seasons. Following a Big 12 regular season title, Big 12 tournament title, and NCAA Tournament Elite Eight finish his junior year, Fizer elected to declare for the NBA draft.

Fizer is ranked fifth on ISU's career scoring list with 1,830 points recorded during his three seasons.

== Professional career ==
Fizer was selected with the fourth pick of the 2000 NBA draft by the Chicago Bulls, coached by Tim Floyd, the coach that recruited him to Iowa State. His debut game was played on October 31, 2000, in an 81 - 100 loss to the Sacramento Kings where he recorded 16 points and 4 rebounds in 24 minutes off the bench.

Many analysts suspected that the Bulls had drafted Fizer merely to trade him for another player, since the Bulls already had Elton Brand at the power forward position. However, no such trade ever took place, and Fizer spent the next four years with the Bulls. He never averaged more than 12.3 points per game. Fizer tore his ACL in late January 2003. In 2004, he was selected by the Charlotte Bobcats in the expansion draft. Not making their final roster, he signed as a free agent with the Milwaukee Bucks.

After one season in Milwaukee, he failed to sign a free agent deal with another team. In November 2005, he signed with the Austin Toros of the NBA Development League. On March 8, 2006, Fizer signed a 10-day contract with the Seattle SuperSonics, but did not play any games for them. On March 31, 2006, he was named the NBA Development League MVP for the 2005–2006 season. The same day, he was signed to a 10-day contract with the New Orleans Hornets. Fizer only played 3 games with New Orleans with averages of 6.7 points, 2.3 rebounds on 53% FG shooting.

Fizer's final NBA game was played on April 19, 2006, in a 95 - 115 loss to the Los Angeles Lakers. Fizer recorded 9 points, 3 rebounds and 1 assist.

He appeared in 289 career NBA games, making 35 starts and averaging 9.6 ppg, 4.6 rpg and 1.2 apg, shooting .435 from the floor and .691 from the free throw line in 20.9 mpg. Fizer scored 20+ points 17 times, with 10+ rebounds on 22 occasions in his four-year NBA career.

Fizer played for the gold medal-winning United States team at the 2001 Goodwill Games in Brisbane, Australia while averaging 4.8 points and 3.0 rebounds, shooting .550 from the floor.

=== Post NBA ===
In the summer of 2006 he signed a one-year contract with Polaris World Murcia of the Spanish league ACB. Then he played with Capitanes de Arecibo, in the Puerto Rico professional basketball league (BSN). In 2007 Fizer signed a two-year deal with the Israeli team Maccabi Tel Aviv. In the 2007–2008 season the Israeli Super League club reached the Euroleague championship game, eventually losing to CSKA Moscow. Fizer was unable to play in the later stages of the Euroleague due to a knee injury that led to the termination of his contract with Maccabi just before the 2008–2009 season started.

In February 2010, Fizer signed with the Guaynabo Mets of Puerto Rico, along with Antoine Walker. In 11 games he averaged 13.4 points, 6.6 rebounds and 2.5 assists per game.

In December 2011, Fizer signed with the Taiwan Mobile Clouded Leopards of Taiwan. He was later released after playing just one game with them, despite scoring an impressive 23 points, 13 rebounds and 2 assists.

In September 2012, Fizer joined Estudiantes de Bahía Blanca of Argentina. In 13 games he averaged 17.2 points, 6.4 rebounds and 1.4 assists per game.

== Personal ==
Fizer has 31 tattoos.

Off the court, he has served as a youth minister. Fizer said in an interview, "My uncle, who was my mother's brother, was taking her to get an abortion, and I don't know if he lost the car or what, but he lost control and crashed into a church. The members of the church helped them and the minister told them 'whatever you're thinking about doing, don't do it, because you're carrying a minister' without her even showing signs of pregnancy."

== NBA statistics ==
=== Regular season ===
Year	Team	GP	GS	MPG	FG%	3P%	FT%	RPG	APG	SPG	BPG	PPG
2000–01	Chicago	72	13	21.9	.430	.256	.727	4.3	1.1	0.4	0.3	9.5
2001–02	Chicago	76	20	25.8	.438	.171	.668	5.6	1.6	0.6	0.3	12.3
2002–03	Chicago	38	0	21.3	.465	.167	.657	5.7	1.3	0.4	0.4	11.7
2003–04	Chicago	46	2	16.0	.383	.118	.750	4.4	0.9	0.3	0.2	7.8
2004–05	Milwaukee	54	0	16.7	.455	.000	.680	3.2	1.2	0.5	0.2	6.2
2005–06	New Orleans/OKC	3	0	13.0	.529	1.000	.500	2.3	0.3	1.2	0.0	6.7
Career		289	35	20.9	.435	.191	.691	4.6	1.2	0.5	0.3	9.6
