= List of 2000–01 NBA season transactions =

This is a list of all transactions occurring in the 2000-01 NBA season.

== Retirement ==
Date	Name	Team(s) played (years)	Age	Notes	Ref.
August 8	Kevin Johnson	Cleveland Cavaliers (1987–1988); Phoenix Suns (1988–1998, 2000)	34	Second retirement	
September 27	Rik Smits	Indiana Pacers (1988–2000)	34		
October 2	Terry Cummings	San Diego Clippers (1982–1984); Milwaukee Bucks (1984–1989, 1995–1996); San Antonio Spurs (1989–1995); Seattle SuperSonics (1997); Philadelphia 76ers (1997–1998); New York Knicks (1998); Golden State Warriors (1999–2000)	39		
November 20	Rex Chapman	Charlotte Hornets (1988–1992); Washington Bullets (1992–1995); Miami Heat (1995–1996); Phoenix Suns (1996–2000)	33	Retired due to injuries	

== Trades ==
June
June 23	To Miami Heat: 2000 1st round pick (Steve Francis)	To Utah Jazz: 2001 1st round pick (Jason Redd)
June 27	Three-team trade	
June 27	To Cleveland Cavaliers: J. R. Reid (from Milwaukee); Robert Traylor (from Milwaukee)	To Golden State Warriors: Bob Sura (from Cleveland); Vinny Del Negro (from Milwaukee)
June 27	To Milwaukee Bucks: Jason Caffey (from Golden State); Billy Owens (from Golden State)	
June 27	To Denver Nuggets: Voshon Lenard; Mark Strickland	To Miami Heat: Chris Gatling; 2000 2nd round pick (Eddie House)
June 28	To Boston Celtics: Draft rights to Josip Sesar	To Seattle SuperSonics: 2001 2nd round pick (Earl Watson); 2001 2nd round pick (Michael Wright)
June 28	To Chicago Bulls: Draft rights to Jamal Crawford; Cash	To Cleveland Cavaliers: Draft rights to Chris Mihm
June 28	To Houston Rockets: Draft rights to Jason Collier; 2001 1st round pick (Jeryl Sasser)	To Milwaukee Bucks: Draft rights to Joel Przybilla
June 28	To Dallas Mavericks: Draft rights to Courtney Alexander	To Orlando Magic: 2001 2nd round pick (Brandon Armstrong)
June 28	To Dallas Mavericks: Draft rights to Eduardo Nájera; 2001 2nd round pick (Kyle Hill)	To Houston Rockets: Draft rights to Dan Langhi
June 28	To Los Angeles Clippers: Corey Maggette; Derek Strong; Draft rights to Keyon Dooling; Cash	To Orlando Magic: 2006 1st round pick (Marcus Williams)
June 28	To Dallas Mavericks: John Wallace; Draft rights to Donnell Harvey	To New York Knicks: Erick Strickland; Draft rights to Pete Mickeal
June 28	To Dallas Mavericks: Eric Murdock	To Los Angeles Clippers: Sean Rooks
August
August 1	To Miami Heat: Ricky Davis; Dale Ellis; Eddie Jones (sign-and-trade); Anthony Mason	To Charlotte Hornets: P. J. Brown; Rodney Buford; Tim James; Jamal Mashburn; Otis Thorpe
August 3	To Orlando Magic: Grant Hill (sign-and-trade)	To Detroit Pistons: Chucky Atkins (sign-and-trade); Ben Wallace (sign-and-trade)
August 3	To Orlando Magic: Andrew DeClercq	To Cleveland Cavaliers: Matt Harpring
August 3	To Orlando Magic: Tracy McGrady (sign-and-trade)	To Toronto Raptors: 2005 1st round pick (Fran Vázquez)
August 16	Four-team trade	
August 16	To Boston Celtics: Hot Rod Williams (from Dallas); Robert Pack (from Dallas); Cash (from Dallas); 2001 1st round pick (Joseph Forte) (from Utah)	To Dallas Mavericks: Dana Barros (from Boston); Bill Curley (sign-and-trade) (from Golden State Warriors); Howard Eisley (sign-and-trade) (from Utah)
August 16	To Utah Jazz: Bruno Šundov (sign-and-trade) (from Dallas); Donyell Marshall (from Golden State)	To Golden State Warriors: Danny Fortson (sign-and-trade) (from Boston); Adam Keefe (from Utah)
August 22	To Washington Wizards: Obinna Ekezie; Felipe López; Cherokee Parks; Dennis Scott	To Vancouver Grizzlies: Isaac Austin
August 22	To Milwaukee Bucks: Lindsey Hunter	To Detroit Pistons: Billy Owens
August 29	To Detroit Pistons: Cedric Ceballos; Eric Murdock; John Wallace	To Dallas Mavericks: Christian Laettner; Terry Mills
August 30	Three-team trade	
August 30	To Cleveland Cavaliers: Chris Gatling (from Miami); Clarence Weatherspoon (from Miami); 2001 1st round pick (Brendan Haywood) (from Miami); Gary Grant (from Portland)	To Portland Trail Blazers: Shawn Kemp (from Cleveland)
August 30	To Miami Heat: Brian Grant (from Portland)	
August 31	To Portland Trail Blazers: Dale Davis	To Indiana Pacers: Joe Kleine; Jermaine O'Neal
September
September 20	Four-team trade	
September 20	To Los Angeles Lakers: Emanual Davis (from Seattle); Greg Foster (from Seattle); Horace Grant (from Seattle); Chuck Person (sign-and-trade) (from Seattle)	To New York Knicks: Travis Knight (from L.A. Lakers); Glen Rice (sign-and-trade) (from L.A. Lakers); 2001 1st round pick (Jamaal Tinsley) (from L.A. Lakers); Luc Longley (from Phoenix); Lazaro Borrell (from Seattle); Vernon Maxwell (from Seattle); Vladimir Stepania (from Seattle); 2001 2nd round pick (Eric Chenowith); 2001 2nd round pick (Michael Wright); 2002 1st round pick (Kareem Rush)
September 20	To Seattle SuperSonics: Patrick Ewing (from New York)	To Phoenix Suns: Chris Dudley (from New York); 2001 1st round pick (Jason Collins)
September 25	To Washington Wizards: Popeye Jones; 2002 2nd round pick (Rod Grizzard)	To Denver Nuggets: Tracy Murray
September 28	To Houston Rockets: 2005 2nd round pick (Robert Whaley); 2006 2nd round pick (Dee Brown)	To Chicago Bulls: Tracy Murray
September 30	To Toronto Raptors: Corliss Williamson	To Sacramento Kings: Doug Christie
October
October 16	To Denver Nuggets: Calbert Cheaney; Robert Pack	To Boston Celtics: Chris Herren; Bryant Stith
October 17	To Detroit Pistons: Dana Barros; Ansu Sesay	To Dallas Mavericks: Loy Vaught
November
November 26	To Miami Heat: Cedric Ceballos; 2003 2nd round pick (Tommy Smith)	To Detroit Pistons: 2002 2nd round pick (Tito Maddox)
January
January 2	To Cleveland Cavaliers: Jim Jackson; Anthony Johnson; Larry Robinson	To Atlanta Hawks: Brevin Knight
January 12	To Toronto Raptors: Keon Clark; Tracy Murray; Mamadou N'Diaye	To Denver Nuggets: Garth Joseph; Aleksandar Radojević; Kevin Willis; 2001 2nd round pick (Ousmane Cisse); Trade exception
January 26	To Phoenix Suns: Vinny Del Negro	To Golden State Warriors: Corie Blount; Rubén Garcés; Paul McPherson
January 30	To Vancouver Grizzlies: Erick Strickland; 2001 1st round pick (Jamaal Tinsley); 2001 2nd round pick (Antonis Fotsis)	To New York Knicks: Othella Harrington
February
February 22	To Philadelphia 76ers: Roshown McLeod; Dikembe Mutombo	To Atlanta Hawks: Toni Kukoč; Nazr Mohammed; Theo Ratliff; Pepe Sanchez
February 22	To Toronto Raptors: Eric Montross; Jerome Williams	To Detroit Pistons: Tyrone Corbin; Kornél Dávid; Corliss Williamson; 2005 1st round pick (Fran Vázquez)
February 22	To Toronto Raptors: Chris Childs; 2002 1st round pick (Kareem Rush)	To New York Knicks: Muggsy Bogues; Mark Jackson
February 22	To Washington Wizards: Courtney Alexander; Hubert Davis; Christian Laettner; Etan Thomas; Loy Vaught; Cash	To Dallas Mavericks: Calvin Booth; Obinna Ekezie; Juwan Howard

== Released ==
Player	Date waived	Former team
Will Perdue	June 26	Chicago Bulls
Charles Jones	July 7	Los Angeles Clippers
Rodrick Rhodes	July 17	Dallas Mavericks
Jayson Williams	July 31	New Jersey Nets
Danny Manning	August 2	Milwaukee Bucks
Randy Livingston	August 31	Phoenix Suns
Chris Mullin	September 12	Indiana Pacers
Eric Murdock	September 12	Detroit Pistons
Gary Grant	September 19	Cleveland Cavaliers
Hersey Hawkins	September 19	Chicago Bulls
Bruno Šundov	September 22	Utah Jazz
Maceo Baston	September 27	Milwaukee Bucks
Lari Ketner	September 28	Cleveland Cavaliers
Chuck Person	September 29	Los Angeles Lakers
Rodney Buford	October 2	Charlotte Hornets
Terry Cummings	October 2	Golden State Warriors
Terrell Bell	October 4	Houston Rockets
Joe Kleine	October 4	Indiana Pacers
Dennis Scott	October 4	Washington Wizards
Vernon Maxwell	October 5	New York Knicks
Joe Vogel	October 5	Los Angeles Clippers
Gerald Brown	October 5	Indiana Pacers
Jaquay Walls	October 5	Indiana Pacers
Trevor Winter	October 5	Indiana Pacers
J. R. Koch	October 6	Phoenix Suns
John Celestand	October 7	New York Knicks
Stephen Howard	October 7	New York Knicks
James Robinson	October 7	Seattle SuperSonics
Ed Stokes	October 7	Seattle SuperSonics
Pete Chilcutt	October 8	Atlanta Hawks
Michael Hawkins	October 8	Atlanta Hawks
Jason Sasser	October 8	Atlanta Hawks
John Coker	October 8	Minnesota Timberwolves
Darnell Robinson	October 8	Philadelphia 76ers
Mario Bennett	October 10	Miami Heat
Ike Nwankwo	October 10	Miami Heat
Matt Fish	October 11	Detroit Pistons
Randy Livingston	October 13	Seattle SuperSonics
Brandon Williams	October 13	Seattle SuperSonics
Ime Udoka	October 13	Portland Trail Blazers
Willie Burton	October 14	Cleveland Cavaliers
Khalid Reeves	October 14	Cleveland Cavaliers
Ed O'Bannon	October 14	Orlando Magic
Darrin Hancock	October 15	Charlotte Hornets
Milt Palacio	October 16	Washington Wizards
Jerod Ward	October 16	Golden State Warriors
Yinka Dare	October 16	Golden State Warriors
Rick Hughes	October 16	Golden State Warriors
Shawn Respert	October 17	Los Angeles Lakers
Ben Davis	October 18	Utah Jazz
Nick Sheppard	October 18	Utah Jazz
Mark Karcher	October 18	Philadelphia 76ers
Ansu Sesay	October 18	Detroit Pistons
Dontae' Jones	October 19	Washington Wizards
Rick Brunson	October 20	Miami Heat
Harold Ellis	October 20	Milwaukee Bucks
Vladimir Stepania	October 20	New York Knicks
Johnny Taylor	October 20	Chicago Bulls
Ace Custis	October 21	Dallas Mavericks
Mitchell Butler	October 21	Indiana Pacers
Rex Walters	October 21	Indiana Pacers
Ron Hale	October 22	Miami Heat
J. R. Henderson	October 22	Sacramento Kings
Jerome James	October 22	Sacramento Kings
Toby Bailey	October 24	Chicago Bulls
Chris Carrawell	October 24	San Antonio Spurs
Jimmie Hunter	October 24	Orlando Magic
Etdrick Bohannon	October 25	Los Angeles Clippers
Ira Bowman	October 25	Utah Jazz
Emanual Davis	October 25	Los Angeles Lakers
Anthony Goldwire	October 25	Denver Nuggets
Eddie Gill	October 25	Orlando Magic
DeJuan Wheat	October 25	Phoenix Suns
Tim Kempton	October 25	Phoenix Suns
Justin Love	October 25	Phoenix Suns
Jason Miskiri	October 25	Boston Celtics
Chris Robinson	October 25	New Jersey Nets
Corey Beck	October 26	Minnesota Timberwolves
Roberto Bergersen	October 26	Milwaukee Bucks
Lazaro Borrell	October 26	New York Knicks
C. J. Bruton	October 26	Portland Trail Blazers
Eddie Elisma	October 26	Seattle SuperSonics
Harvey Grant	October 26	Washington Wizards
Paul Grant	October 26	Vancouver Grizzlies
Michael Hawkins	October 26	Cleveland Cavaliers
Derek Hood	October 26	Philadelphia 76ers
Todd Lindeman	October 26	Portland Trail Blazers
Ryan Lorthridge	October 26	Los Angeles Clippers
Jeff Nordgaard	October 26	Vancouver Grizzlies
Andy Panko	October 26	Los Angeles Lakers
Jeff Sheppard	October 26	Toronto Raptors
Nick Sheppard	October 26	Toronto Raptors
Dickey Simpkins	October 26	Seattle SuperSonics
Jamel Thomas	October 26	Portland Trail Blazers
Jameel Watkins	October 26	Milwaukee Bucks
Robert Werdann	October 26	Cleveland Cavaliers
Tyson Wheeler	October 26	Seattle SuperSonics
Chris Carrawell	October 27	Atlanta Hawks
John Celestand	October 27	Dallas Mavericks
Arijan Komazec	October 27	Vancouver Grizzlies
Lorenzo Williams	October 27	Washington Wizards
Dan Cross	October 28	Atlanta Hawks
Stephen Howard	October 28	Atlanta Hawks
Rick Hughes	October 28	Atlanta Hawks
Nikita Morgunov	October 28	Portland Trail Blazers
Antonio Smith	October 28	Detroit Pistons
David Vanterpool	October 28	Detroit Pistons
Sharone Wright	October 28	Minnesota Timberwolves
Jermaine Jackson	October 29	Philadelphia 76ers
Igor Rakočević	October 29	Minnesota Timberwolves
Cory Alexander	October 30	Denver Nuggets
Malik Allen	October 30	Sacramento Kings
Raja Bell	October 30	San Antonio Spurs
Stais Boseman	October 30	Houston Rockets
Dale Ellis	October 30	Miami Heat
Kevin Freeman	October 30	New Jersey Nets
Steve Goodrich	October 30	Chicago Bulls
Cory Hightower	October 30	Los Angeles Lakers
Jimmy King	October 30	Indiana Pacers
Antonio Lang	October 30	Sacramento Kings
Randy Livingston	October 30	Orlando Magic
Dan McClintock	October 30	Denver Nuggets
Elliot Perry	October 30	New Jersey Nets
Rodrick Rhodes	October 30	Portland Trail Blazers
Roy Rogers	October 30	Sacramento Kings
Vladimir Stepania	October 30	Toronto Raptors
John "Hot Rod" Williams	October 30	Boston Celtics
Harold Jamison	October 31	Miami Heat
Greg Minor	November 6	Boston Celtics
Anthony Miller	November 8	Atlanta Hawks
Mark Bryant	November 15	Cleveland Cavaliers
Joe Smith	November 20	Detroit Pistons
Rick Brunson	November 21	Boston Celtics
Randy Livingston	November 22	Golden State Warriors
Jamal Robinson	November 26	Miami Heat
Jonathan Kerner	November 27	New York Knicks
Bill Curley	November 28	Dallas Mavericks
Obinna Ekezie	November 29	Los Angeles Clippers
Elliot Perry	November 30	Orlando Magic
Doug Overton	December 6	Boston Celtics
Rex Chapman	December 7	Phoenix Suns
Kevin Ollie	December 15	New Jersey Nets
Pervis Ellison	December 16	Seattle SuperSonics
Ademola Okulaja	December 19	Philadelphia 76ers
Terrance Roberson	December 19	Charlotte Hornets
Vernon Maxwell	December 22	Philadelphia 76ers
Anthony Miller	December 29	Houston Rockets
William Cunningham	December 31	Vancouver Grizzlies
Michael Hawkins	January 2	Cleveland Cavaliers
J. R. Reid	January 2	Cleveland Cavaliers
Bill Curley	January 3	Golden State Warriors
John Coker	January 4	Golden State Warriors
Pete Mickeal	January 5	New York Knicks
Milt Palacio	January 5	Boston Celtics
Elliot Perry	January 5	Phoenix Suns
Larry Robinson	January 5	Cleveland Cavaliers
Chucky Brown	January 26	Golden State Warriors
Garth Joseph	January 29	Denver Nuggets
Gerard King	February 22	Washington Wizards
Felipe López	February 22	Washington Wizards
Mike Smith	February 22	Washington Wizards
Tyrone Corbin	February 23	Detroit Pistons
Todd Day	February 27	Minnesota Timberwolves
Rubén Garcés	February 28	Golden State Warriors
Rod Strickland	February 28	Washington Wizards
Gary Grant	March 5	Portland Trail Blazers
Pepe Sánchez	March 11	Atlanta Hawks
Khalid El-Amin	March 20	Chicago Bulls
Mark Strickland	March 22	Denver Nuggets
Keith Closs	May 4	Los Angeles Clippers

== Signings ==
Player	Date signed	New team	Former team
Tariq Abdul-Wahad	August 1	Denver Nuggets	
Raja Bell	August 1	Miami Heat	Yakima Sun Kings (CBA)
Corie Blount	August 1	Phoenix Suns	
Mark Blount	August 1	Boston Celtics	New Jersey Shorecats (USBL)
Bruce Bowen	August 1	Miami Heat	
Anthony Carter	August 1	Miami Heat	
Hubert Davis	August 1	Dallas Mavericks	
Tim Duncan	August 1	San Antonio Spurs	
Rubén Garcés	August 1	Phoenix Suns	La Crosse Bobcats (CBA)
Bobby Jackson	August 1	Sacramento Kings	Minnesota Timberwolves
Avery Johnson	August 1	San Antonio Spurs	
Eddie Jones	August 1	Miami Heat (sign-and-trade)	Charlotte Hornets
Rashard Lewis	August 1	Seattle SuperSonics	
Justin Love	August 1	Phoenix Suns	Saint Louis Billikens
Sam Perkins	August 1	Indiana Pacers	
Scot Pollard	August 1	Sacramento Kings	
Daniel Santiago	August 1	Phoenix Suns	Pallacanestro Varese
Kurt Thomas	August 1	New York Knicks	
Tim Thomas	August 1	Milwaukee Bucks	
Gary Trent	August 1	Dallas Mavericks	
Derek Anderson	August 2	San Antonio Spurs	Los Angeles Clippers
Austin Croshere	August 2	Indiana Pacers	
Tony Delk	August 2	Phoenix Suns	Sacramento Kings
Ron Mercer	August 2	Chicago Bulls	Orlando Magic
Cuttino Mobley	August 2	Houston Rockets	
Jalen Rose	August 2	Indiana Pacers	
Chucky Atkins	August 3	Detroit Pistons (sign-and-trade)	Orlando Magic
Chauncey Billups	August 3	Minnesota Timberwolves	Denver Nuggets
Ryan Bowen	August 3	Denver Nuggets	
Dee Brown	August 3	Orlando Magic	Toronto Raptors
Randy Brown	August 3	Boston Celtics	Chicago Bulls
Antonio Daniels	August 3	San Antonio Spurs	
Adonal Foyle	August 3	Golden State Warriors	
Grant Hill	August 3	Orlando Magic (sign-and-trade)	Detroit Pistons
Tracy McGrady	August 3	Orlando Magic (sign-and-trade)	Toronto Raptors
Ben Wallace	August 3	Detroit Pistons (sign-and-trade)	Orlando Magic
Bo Outlaw	August 4	Orlando Magic	
John Starks	August 4	Utah Jazz	Chicago Bulls
Monty Williams	August 4	Orlando Magic	
Greg Buckner	August 5	Dallas Mavericks	
John Amaechi	August 7	Orlando Magic	
Damon Jones	August 8	Vancouver Grizzlies	Gulf Coast Sun Dogs (USBL)
Tony Massenburg	August 8	Vancouver Grizzlies	
Joe Smith	August 8	Minnesota Timberwolves	
Jacque Vaughn	August 8	Utah Jazz	
Torraye Braggs	August 9	Detroit Pistons	unknown
Reggie Miller	August 9	Indiana Pacers	
Jon Barry	August 10	Sacramento Kings	
Danny Ferry	August 10	San Antonio Spurs	Cleveland Cavaliers
Troy Hudson	August 10	Orlando Magic	Los Angeles Clippers
Mikki Moore	August 10	Detroit Pistons	
Ira Newble	August 10	San Antonio Spurs	Keravnos Strovolos (Cyprus)
Shawnelle Scott	August 10	San Antonio Spurs	Gigantes de Carolina (Puerto Rico)
Aaron Williams	August 10	New Jersey Nets	Washington Wizards
Jud Buechler	August 11	Detroit Pistons	
Bimbo Coles	August 11	Cleveland Cavaliers	Atlanta Hawks
John Crotty	August 11	Utah Jazz	Detroit Pistons
Kendall Gill	August 11	New Jersey Nets	
Mark Jackson	August 11	Toronto Raptors	Indiana Pacers
Johnny Newman	August 11	New Jersey Nets	
Laron Profit	August 11	Washington Wizards	
Jahidi White	August 11	Washington Wizards	
Chris Whitney	August 11	Washington Wizards	
Greg Anthony	August 13	Portland Trail Blazers	
Darvin Ham	August 14	Milwaukee Bucks	
Lee Nailon	August 14	Charlotte Hornets	Adecco Milano (Italy)
Don Reid	August 14	Orlando Magic	Washington Wizards
Jelani McCoy	August 15	Seattle SuperSonics	
Slava Medvedenko	August 15	Los Angeles Lakers	Kyiv (Ukraine)
Bill Curley	August 16	Dallas Mavericks (sign-and-trade)	Golden State Warriors
Howard Eisley	August 16	Dallas Mavericks (sign-and-trade)	Utah Jazz
Danny Fortson	August 16	Golden State Warriors (sign-and-trade)	Boston Celtics
Danny Manning	August 16	Utah Jazz	Milwaukee Bucks
Bruno Šundov	August 16	Utah Jazz (sign-and-trade)	Dallas Mavericks
Dragan Tarlać	August 16	Chicago Bulls	Olympiacos (Greece)
Jermaine Jackson	August 17	Philadelphia 76ers	Detroit Pistons
Anthony Johnson	August 18	Atlanta Hawks	Orlando Magic
Andy Panko	August 18	Los Angeles Lakers	New Mexico Slam (IBL)
Mahmoud Abdul-Rauf	August 19	Vancouver Grizzlies	Fenerbahçe (Turkey)
Chris Carr	August 19	Boston Celtics	Chicago Bulls
Darrin Hancock	August 21	Charlotte Hornets	Dodge City Legend (USBL)
Toni Kukoč	August 21	Philadelphia 76ers	
Paul McPherson	August 21	Phoenix Suns	DePaul Blue Demons
Gerard King	August 24	Washington Wizards	
Isaiah Rider	August 25	Los Angeles Lakers	Atlanta Hawks
Mo Taylor	August 25	Houston Rockets	Los Angeles Clippers
Harold Jamison	August 28	Miami Heat	
Dontae' Jones	August 28	Washington Wizards	La Crosse Bobcats (CBA)
Gary Grant	August 29	Cleveland Cavaliers (sign-and-trade)	Portland Trail Blazers
Terry Mills	August 29	Dallas Mavericks (sign-and-trade)	Detroit Pistons
Brian Grant	August 30	Miami Heat (sign-and-trade)	Portland Trail Blazers
Joe Kleine	August 31	Indiana Pacers (sign-and-trade)	Portland Trail Blazers
Todd Fuller	September 5	Miami Heat	Charlotte Hornets
Yinka Dare	September 7	Golden State Warriors	Fort Worth Fury (CBA)
Rubén Wolkowyski	September 7	Seattle SuperSonics	Estudiantes de Olavarría (Argentina)
Gerald Brown	September 8	Indiana Pacers	Rockford Lightning (CBA)
Rex Walters	September 8	Indiana Pacers	Baloncesto León (Spain)
C. J. Bruton	September 10	Portland Trail Blazers	Wollongong Hawks
Don MacLean	September 12	Miami Heat	Phoenix Suns
Stacey Augmon	September 13	Portland Trail Blazers	
Duane Causwell	September 13	Miami Heat	
Ron Hale	September 13	Miami Heat	Florida State Seminoles
Will Perdue	September 13	Portland Trail Blazers	Chicago Bulls
Muggsy Bogues	September 14	Toronto Raptors	
Trevor Winter	September 14	Indiana Pacers	unknown
Eddie Gill	September 15	Orlando Magic	Weber State Wildcats
Mario Elie	September 16	Phoenix Suns	San Antonio Spurs
Roberto Bergersen	September 19	Milwaukee Bucks	Idaho Stampede (CBA)
Mark Pope	September 19	Milwaukee Bucks	Ülkerspor (Turkey)
Chuck Person	September 20	Los Angeles Lakers (sign-and-trade)	Seattle SuperSonics
Glen Rice	September 20	New York Knicks (sign-and-trade)	Los Angeles Lakers
Hersey Hawkins	September 21	Charlotte Hornets	Chicago Bulls
Ed O'Bannon	September 21	Orlando Magic	Boca Juniors (Argentina)
Jimmie Hunter	September 22	Orlando Magic	Life Running Eagles
Jamal Robinson	September 22	Miami Heat	Al Riyadi (Lebanon)
John Coker	September 25	Minnesota Timberwolves	Quad City Thunder (CBA)
Reggie Slater	September 25	Minnesota Timberwolves	Montecatini SC (Italy)
Terry Davis	September 26	Denver Nuggets	Washington Wizards
Rick Brunson	September 27	Miami Heat	New York Knicks
Jerome James	September 27	Sacramento Kings	Harlem Globetrotters
Lari Ketner RFA	September 27	Cleveland Cavaliers	
Brad Miller RFA	September 27	Chicago Bulls	Charlotte Hornets (refuse to match offer sheet)
Bruno Šundov	September 27	Indiana Pacers	Utah Jazz
Corey Beck	September 28	Minnesota Timberwolves	Žalgiris Kaunas (Lithuania)
Todd Lindeman	September 28	Portland Trail Blazers	unknown
Chris Mullin	September 28	Golden State Warriors	Indiana Pacers
Milt Palacio	September 28	Washington Wizards	Vancouver Grizzlies
Earl Boykins RFA	September 29	Los Angeles Clippers	Cleveland Cavaliers (refused to match offer sheet)
Willie Burton	September 29	Cleveland Cavaliers	Oklahoma Storm (USBL)
Kevin Edwards	September 29	Vancouver Grizzlies	Orlando Magic
Ed Elisma	September 29	Seattle SuperSonics	Spirou Charleroi (Belgium)
Paul Grant	September 29	Vancouver Grizzlies	Rockford Lightning (CBA)
Zendon Hamilton	September 29	Los Angeles Clippers	Dafni BC (Greece)
Tim Hardaway	September 29	Miami Heat	
Tim Kempton	September 29	Phoenix Suns	León Caja España (Spain)
J. R. Koch	September 29	Phoenix Suns	Athlon Ieper (Belgium)
Ryan Lorthridge	September 29	Los Angeles Clippers	unknown
Khalid Reeves	September 29	Cleveland Cavaliers	Chicago Bulls
Ed Stokes	September 29	Seattle SuperSonics	Keravnos (Cyprus)
Joe Vogel	September 29	Los Angeles Clippers	Sagesse (Lebanon)
Robert Werdann	September 29	Cleveland Cavaliers	Baltimore Bayrunners (IBL)
DeJuan Wheat	September 29	Phoenix Suns	Idaho Stampede (CBA)
Tyson Wheeler	September 29	Seattle SuperSonics	Quad City Thunder (CBA)
Brandon Williams	September 29	Seattle SuperSonics	New York Knicks
Tyus Edney	September 30	Indiana Pacers	Benetton Treviso (Italy)
Lari Ketner	September 30	Indiana Pacers	Cleveland Cavaliers
Jimmy King	September 30	Indiana Pacers	Quad City Thunder (CBA)
Marc Jackson	September 30	Golden State Warriors	Cantabria Lobos (Spain)
Arijan Komazec	October 1	Vancouver Grizzlies	Zadar (Croatia)
Malik Allen	October 2	Sacramento Kings	Villanova Wildcats
Toby Bailey	October 2	Chicago Bulls	Phoenix Suns
Terrell Bell	October 2	Houston Rockets	unknown

== Draft ==
=== 1st Round ===
Pick	Player	Date signed	Team	School/club team
1	Kenyon Martin	August 22	New Jersey Nets	Cincinnati (Sr.)
2	Stromile Swift	July 18	Vancouver Grizzlies	LSU (So.)
3	Darius Miles	August 8	Los Angeles Clippers	East St. Louis HS (East St. Louis, IL)
4	Marcus Fizer	September 26	Chicago Bulls	Iowa State (Jr.)
5	Mike Miller	August 11	Orlando Magic	Florida (So.)
6	DerMarr Johnson	July 13	Atlanta Hawks	Cincinnati (Fr.)
7	Chris Mihm	July 13	Cleveland Cavaliers	Texas (Jr.)
8	Jamal Crawford	September 25	Chicago Bulls	Michigan (Fr.)
9	Joel Przybilla	July 8	Milwaukee Bucks	Minnesota (So.)
10	Keyon Dooling	August 8	Los Angeles Clippers	Missouri (So.)
11	Jérome Moïso	September 27	Boston Celtics	UCLA (So.)
12	Etan Thomas	July 7	Dallas Mavericks	Syracuse (Sr.)
13	Courtney Alexander	July 6	Dallas Mavericks	Fresno State (Sr.)
14	Mateen Cleaves	September 6	Detroit Pistons	Michigan State (Sr.)
15	Jason Collier	July 17	Houston Rockets	Georgia Tech (Sr.)
16	Hedo Türkoğlu	August 4	Chicago Bulls	St. John's (So.)
17	Desmond Mason	August 3	Seattle SuperSonics	Oklahoma State (Sr.)
18	Quentin Richardson	August 8	Los Angeles Clippers	DePaul (So.)
19	Jamaal Magloire	July 18	Charlotte Hornets	Kentucky (Sr.)
20	Speedy Claxton	July 13	Philadelphia 76ers	Hofstra (Sr.)
21	Morris Peterson	October 2	Toronto Raptors	Michigan State (Sr.)
22	Donnell Harvey	September 28	Dallas Mavericks	Florida (Fr.)
23	DeShawn Stevenson	July 14	Utah Jazz	Washington Union HS (Fresno, California)
24	Dalibor Bagarić	October 26	Chicago Bulls	Benston Zagreb (Croatia)
25	Jake Tsakalidis	October 2	Phoenix Suns	AEK (Greece)
26	Mamadou N'Diaye	July 17	Denver Nuggets	Auburn (Sr.)
27	Primož Brezec	July 15	Philadelphia 76ers	Union Olimpija (Slovenia)
28	Erick Barkley	September 15	Portland Trail Blazers	St. John's (So.)
29	Mark Madsen	July 5	Los Angeles Lakers	Stanford (Sr.)

=== 2nd round ===
Pick	Player	Date signed	Team	School/club team
30	Marko Jarić		Los Angeles Clippers	Paf Bologna (Italy)
31	Dan Langhi	July 17	Houston Rockets	Vanderbilt (Sr.)
32	A.J. Guyton	October 11	Chicago Bulls	Indiana (Sr.)
33	Jake Voskuhl	October 18	Chicago Bulls	Connecticut (Sr.)
34	Khalid El-Amin	October 2	Chicago Bulls	Connecticut (Jr.)
35	Mike Smith	August 23	Washington Wizards	Louisiana-Monroe (Jr.)
36	Soumaila Samake	September 6	New Jersey Nets	Cincinnati Stuff (IBL)
37	Eddie House	August 14	Miami Heat	Arizona St. (Sr.)
38	Eduardo Nájera	July 7	Dallas Mavericks	Oklahoma (Sr.)
39	Lavor Postell	October 3	New York Knicks	St. John's (Sr.)
40	Hanno Möttölä	July 25	Atlanta Hawks	Utah (Sr.)
41	Chris Carrawell	July 17	San Antonio Spurs	Duke (Sr.)
42	Olumide Oyedeji	August 9	Seattle SuperSonics	Würzburg (Germany)
43	Michael Redd	July 16	Milwaukee Bucks	Ohio State (Jr.)
44	Brian Cardinal	October 2	Detroit Pistons	Purdue (Sr.)
45	Jabari Smith	July 17	Sacramento Kings	LSU (Sr.)
46	DeeAndre Hulett		Toronto Raptors	COS (So.)
47	Josip Sesar		Boston Celtics	Cibona Zagreb (Croatia)
48	Mark Karcher	July 13	Philadelphia 76ers	Temple (Jr.)
49	Jason Hart	July 6	Milwaukee Bucks	Syracuse (Sr.)
50	Kaniel Dickens		Utah Jazz	Idaho (Sr.)
51	Igor Rakočević	September 16	Minnesota Timberwolves	Red Star Belgrade (Yugoslavia)
52	Ernest Brown		Miami Heat	Indian Hills CC (Jr.)
53	Dan McClintock	July 17	Denver Nuggets	Northern Arizona (Sr.)
54	Cory Hightower	August 10	Los Angeles Lakers	Indian Hills CC (So.)
55	Chris Porter	August 11	Golden State Warriors	Auburn (Sr.)
56	Jaquay Walls	August 26	Indiana Pacers	Colorado (Sr.)
57	Scoonie Penn	October 2	Atlanta Hawks	Ohio State (Sr.)
58	Pete Mickeal	October 2	New York Knicks	Cincinnati (Sr.)
