= 2000 NBA draft =

Basketball player selection

General information
- Sport: Basketball
- Date: June 28, 2000
- Location: Target Center (Minneapolis, Minnesota)
- Networks: Sportsnet; TNT; TSN

Overview
- 58 total selections in 2 rounds
- League: NBA
- First selection: Kenyon Martin (New Jersey Nets)

The 2000 NBA draft was held on June 28, 2000, at the Target Center in Minneapolis. It was the last draft held at the home arena of an NBA team until 2011; the following and subsequent drafts (through 2010) all took place at The Theater at Madison Square Garden in New York City (though Madison Square Garden itself is the home of the New York Knicks, they do not play in the theater). This is also the last NBA draft to use a "rotating host" format similar to the NHL entry draft and NFL draft, in which different NBA cities hosted the draft. In addition, is the last draft held outside of New York City or its metropolitan area. As of 2025, it is also the last NBA draft where a college senior was the number-one overall selection, and, along with the 1951 NBA Draft, one of only two (and the most recent) drafts with no Naismith Memorial Basketball Hall of Fame players (excluding drafts with players not yet eligible).

The 2000 draft class is considered the worst in NBA history. Few of its draftees would enjoy extended careers in the league. Just three of them—top pick Kenyon Martin, first-round selection Jamaal Magloire (19th overall) and second-round pick Michael Redd (43rd overall) -- ever played in an NBA All-Star Game. Each of the three made their lone All-Star appearance in 2004. The three cumulative All-Star appearances marks the lowest cumulative appearances since the 1952 NBA draft. Redd was the lone player from this draft to ever be chosen for an All-NBA Team (his sole appearance was on the third team in 2004). Only three players in this draft class won a major end-of-season award in their careers: Hedo Türkoğlu was named Most Improved Player in 2008, Mike Miller won the NBA Rookie of the Year and NBA Sixth Man of the Year awards in 2001 and 2006 respectively, and Jamal Crawford was awarded the NBA Sixth Man of the Year three times in 2010, 2014 and 2016.

Sports Illustrated named this entire draft class (as opposed to individual players) the sixth biggest bust of the modern era – making it the only draft class among the site's top 20 list. Just before the 2009 draft, ESPN.com columnist David Schoenfield graded all of the drafts since the institution of the draft lottery in 1985, and the only draft to which he gave the lowest possible grade of 'F' was the 2000 draft. Using the WARP (wins above replacement player) metric, the 2000 NBA draft class collectively produced at a rate of 17.3 wins worse than a group of "average replacement players", effectively making this draft class the only one in NBA history to leave the league's talent pool worse than it had been before.

Eight of the players selected in this draft never played in an NBA game in their professional basketball careers. Both of the players drafted by the San Antonio Spurs (Chris Carrawell and Cory Hightower) are among this group.

The final active player remaining from this class was Jamal Crawford, who retired from the NBA following the 2020 season.

== Draft selections ==
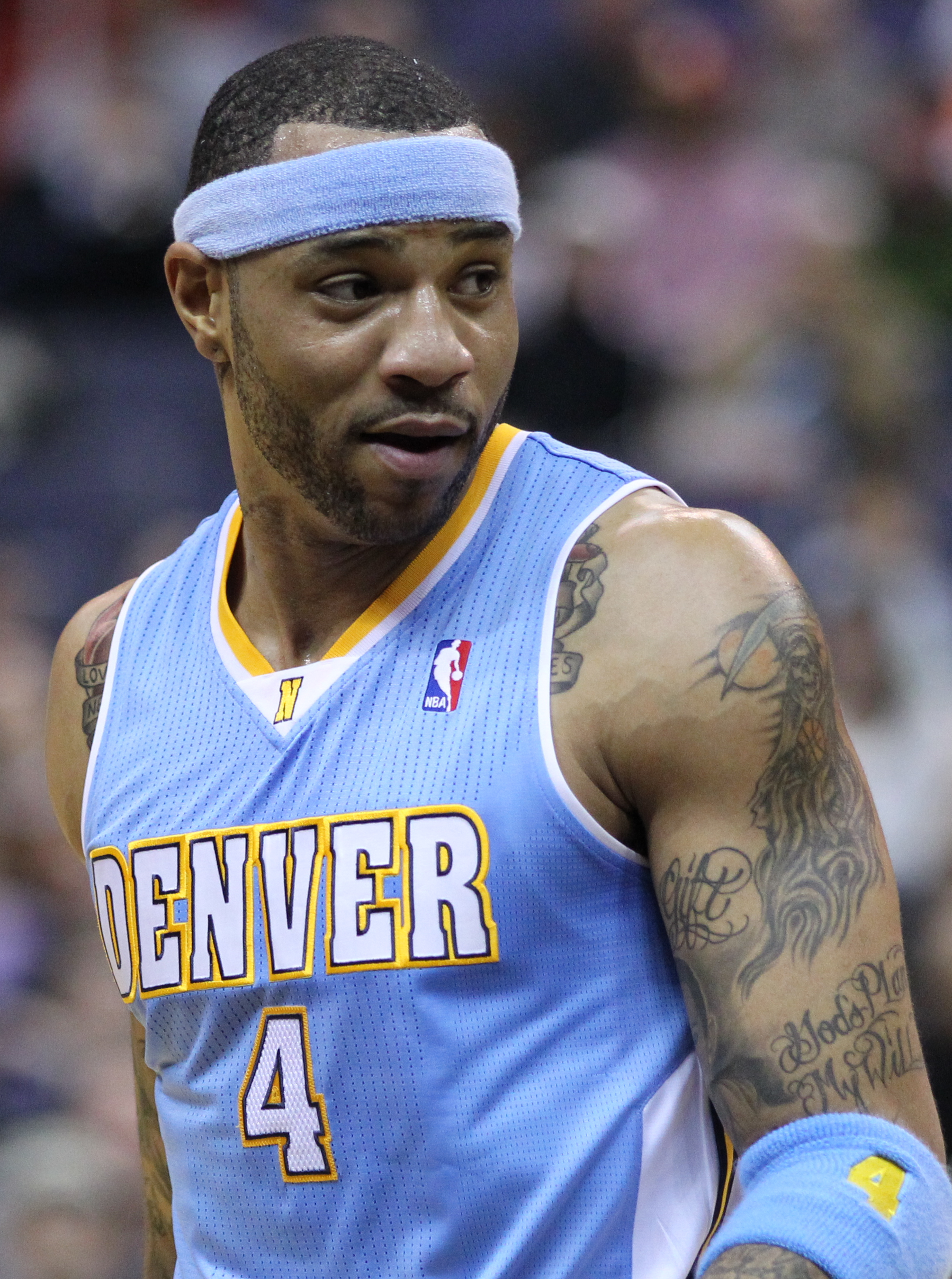
Kenyon Martin was selected 1st overall by the New Jersey Nets.

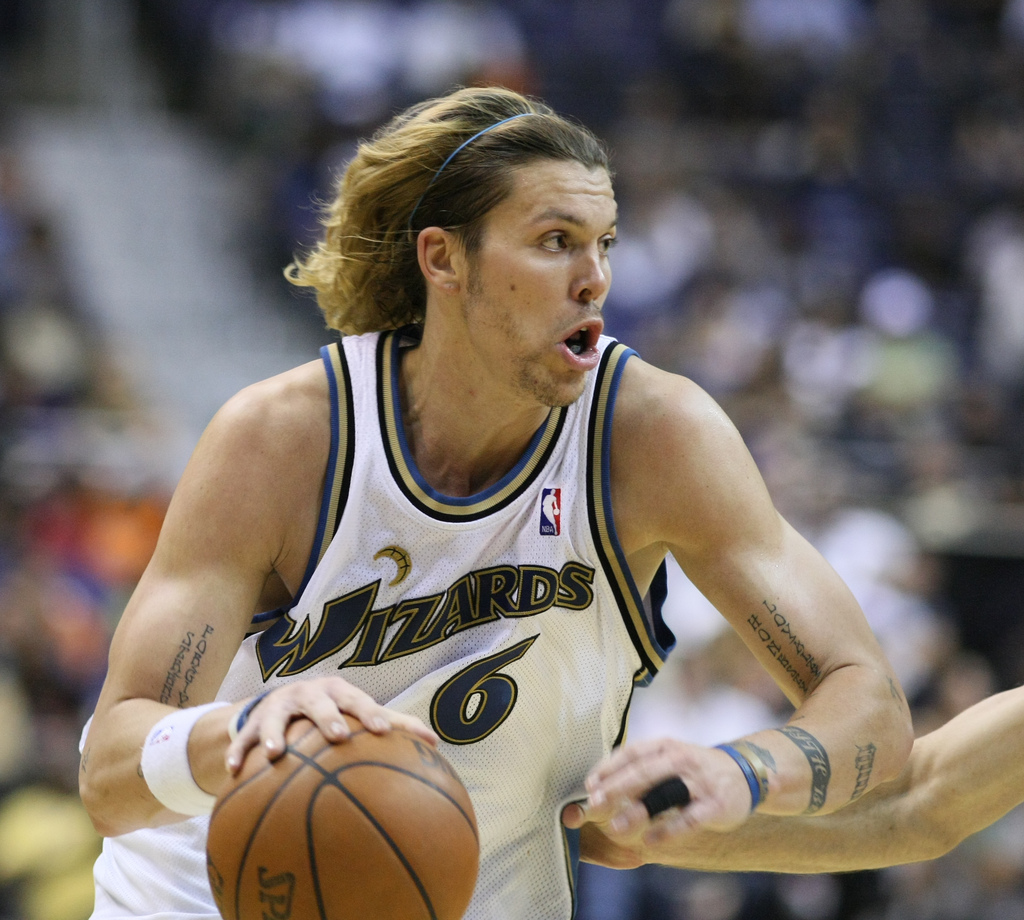
Mike Miller was selected 5th overall by the Orlando Magic.

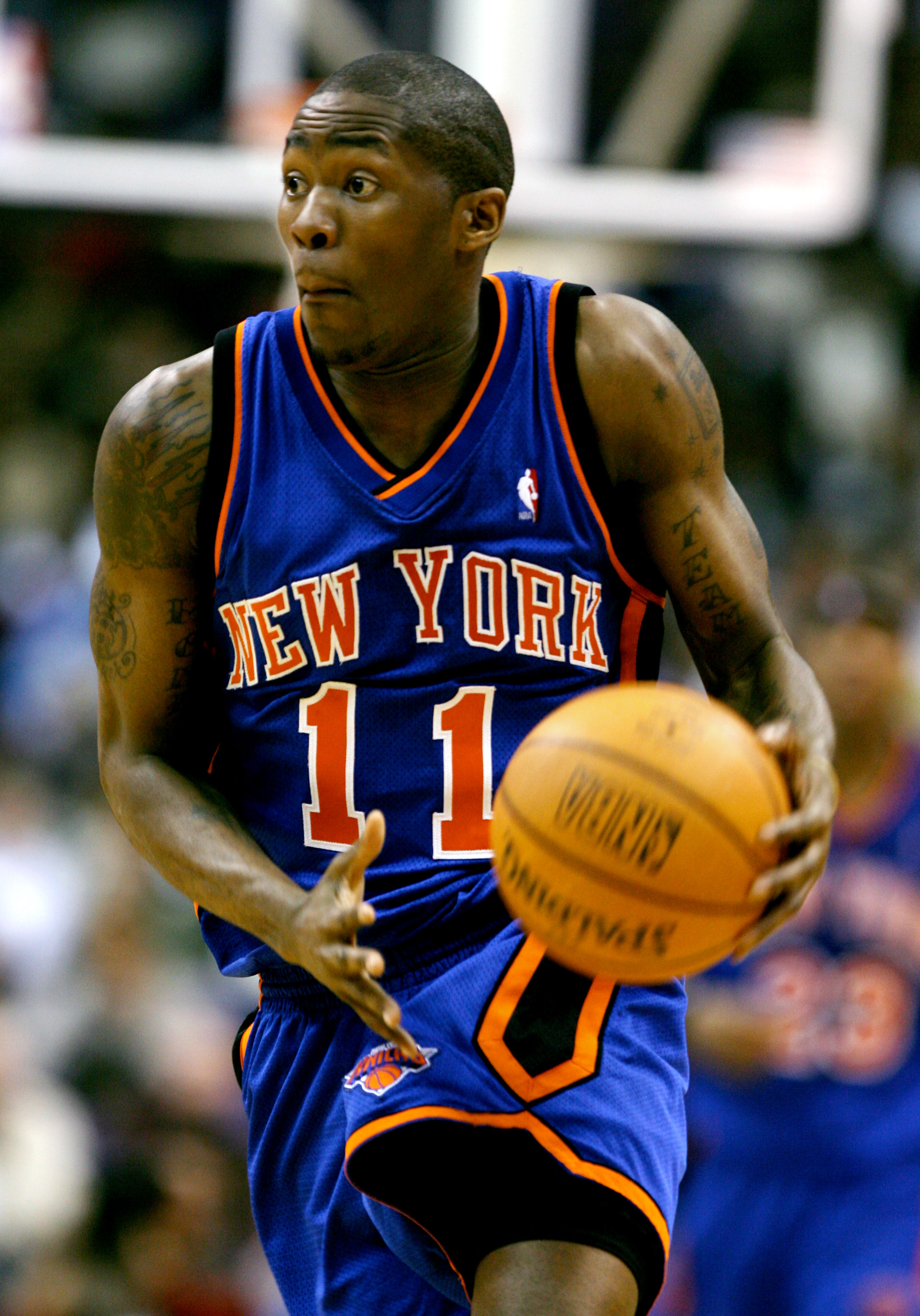
Jamal Crawford was selected 8th overall by the Cleveland Cavaliers.

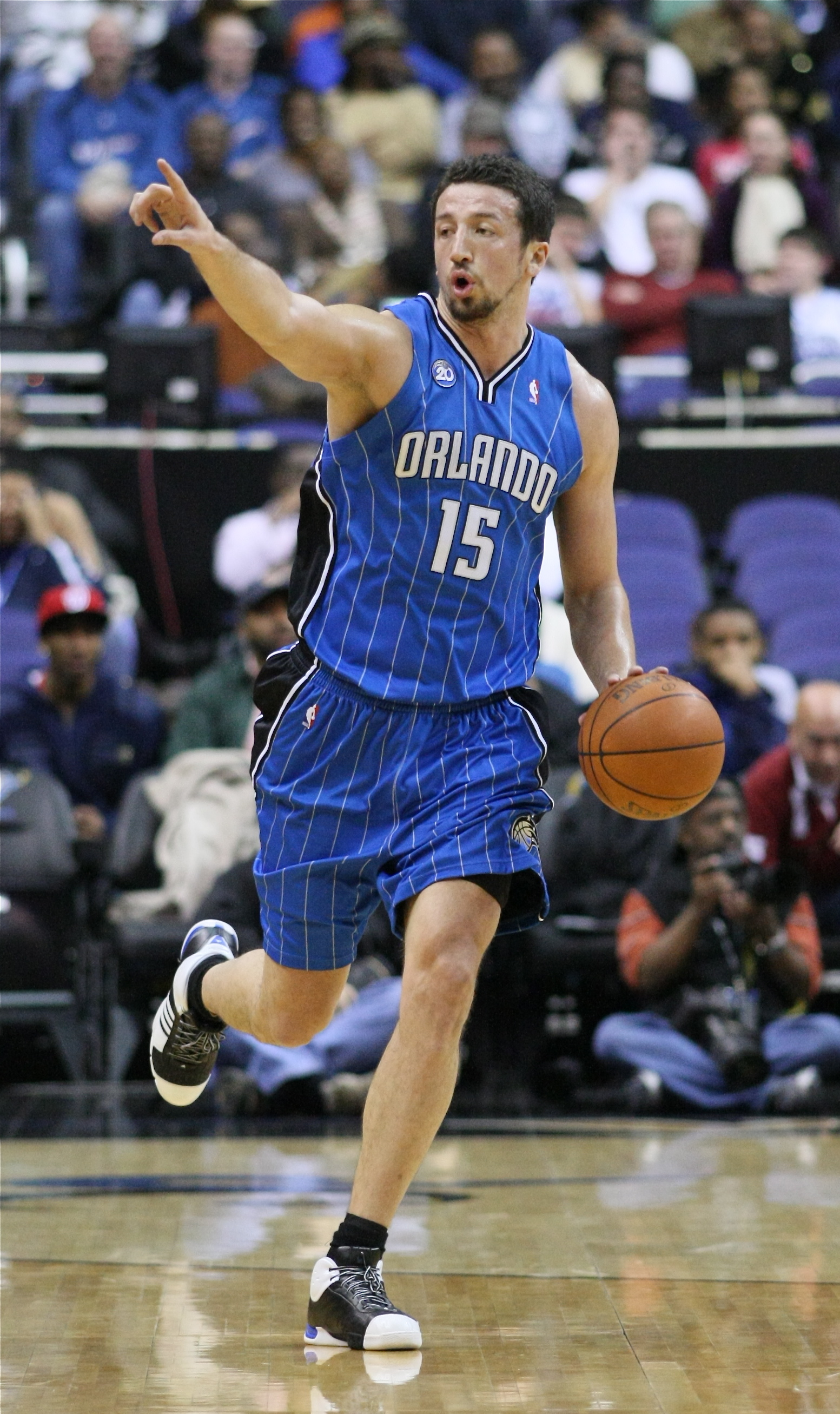
Hedo Türkoğlu was selected 16th overall by the Sacramento Kings.

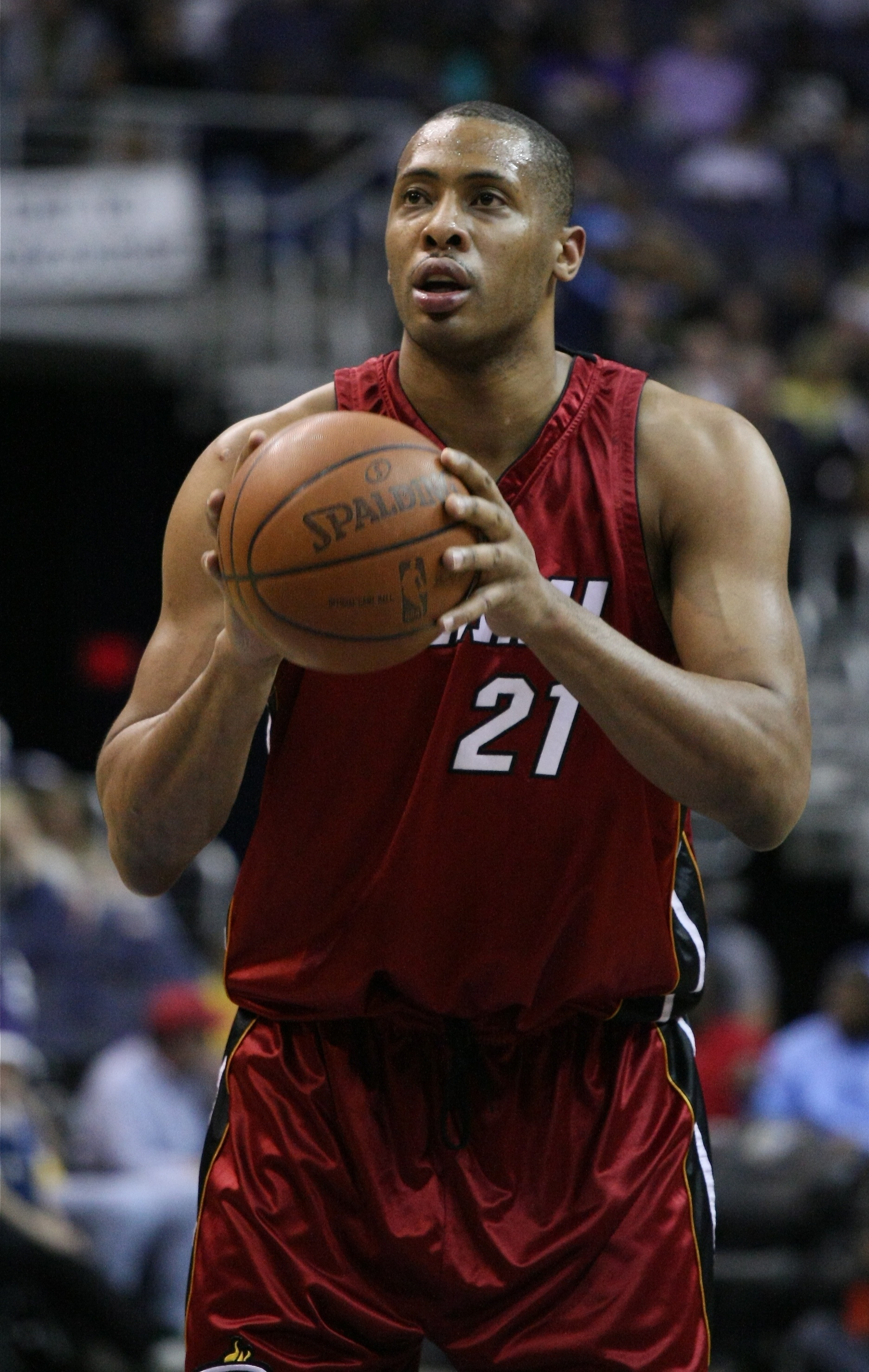
Jamaal Magloire was selected 19th overall by the Charlotte Hornets.

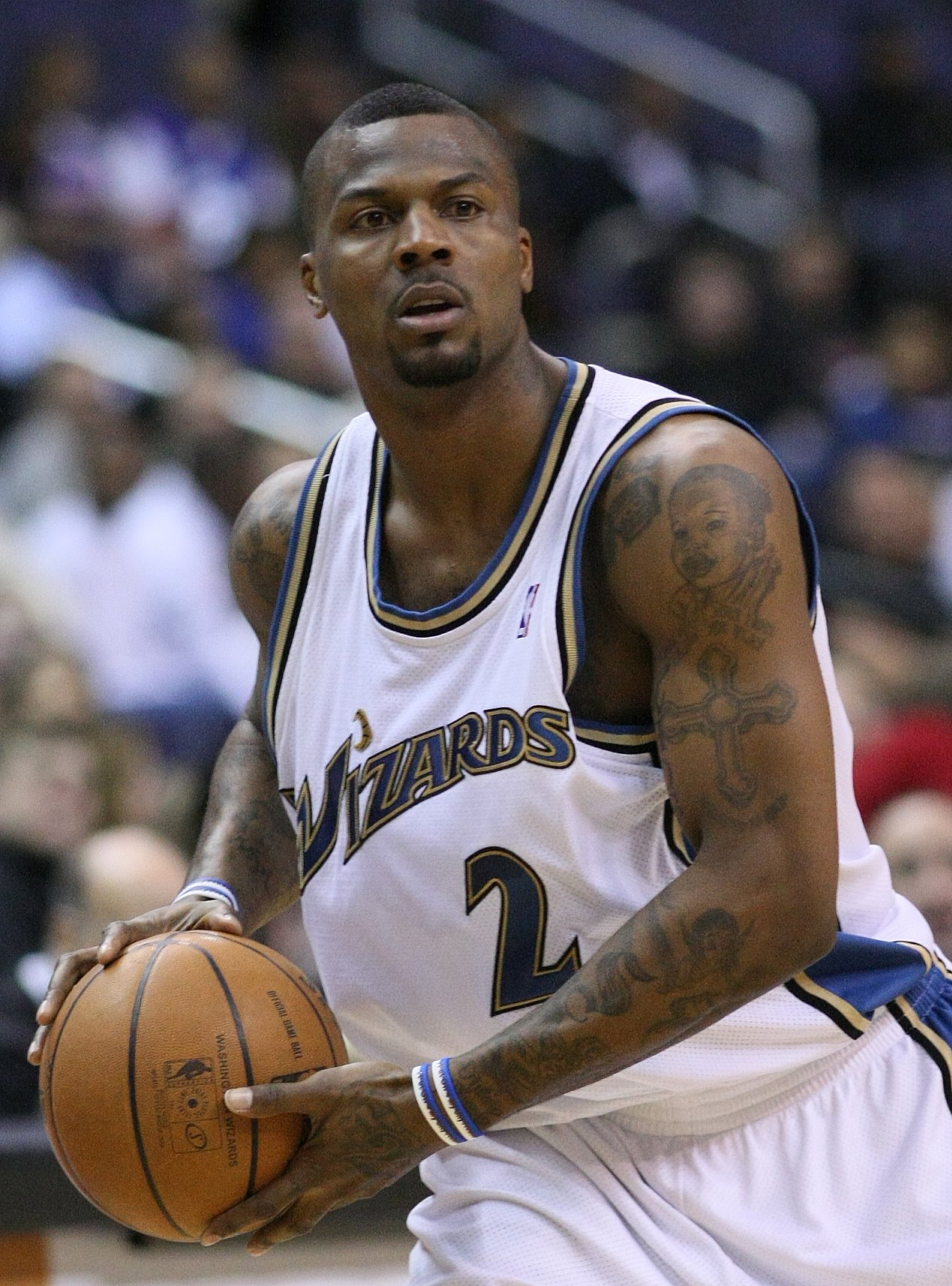
DeShawn Stevenson was selected 23rd overall by the Utah Jazz.

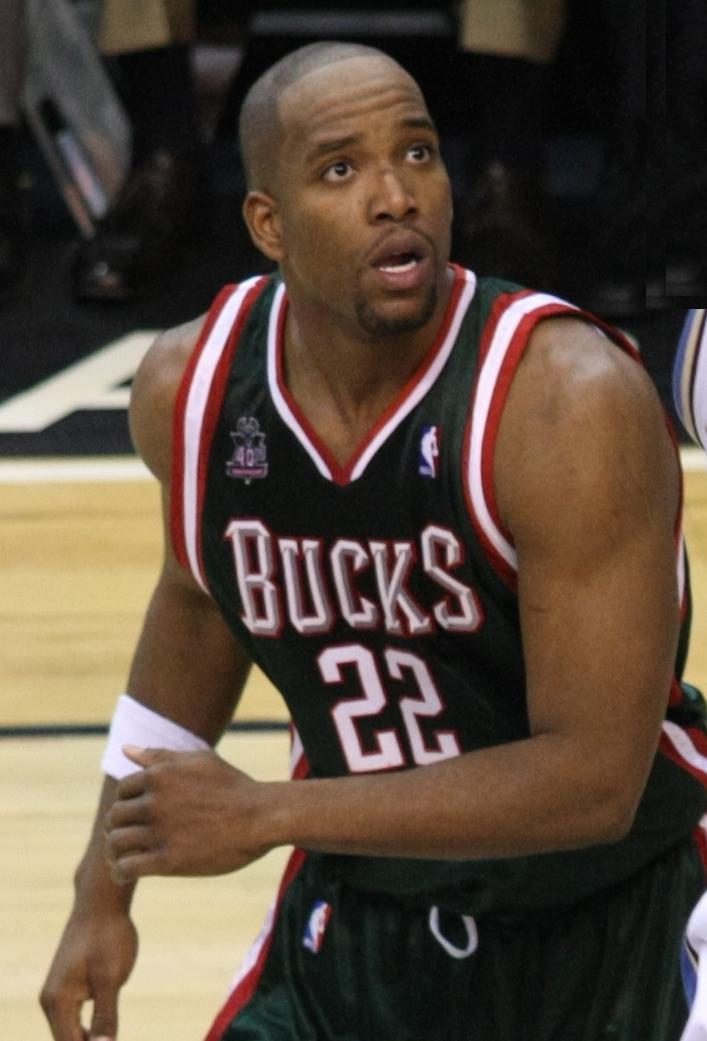
Michael Redd was selected 43rd overall by the Milwaukee Bucks.

G	Guard	PG	Point guard	SG	Shooting guard	F	Forward	SF	Small forward	PF	Power forward	C	Center

*	Denotes player who has been selected for at least one All-Star Game and All-NBA Team
^{+}	Denotes player who has been selected for at least one All-Star Game
^{#}	Denotes player who has never appeared in an NBA regular-season or playoff game
^{~}	Denotes player who has been selected as Rookie of the Year

Round	Pick	Player	Position	Nationality (Note: Nationality indicates the player's national team or representative nationality. If a player has not competed at the international level, then the nationality indicates the national team which the player is eligible to represent according to FIBA rules.)	Team	School/club team
1	1	Kenyon Martin^{+}	PF	United States	New Jersey Nets	Cincinnati (Sr.)
1	2	Stromile Swift	PF/C	United States	Vancouver Grizzlies	LSU (So.)
1	3	Darius Miles	SF/PF	United States	Los Angeles Clippers	East St. Louis HS (Illinois)
1	4	Marcus Fizer	PF/SF	United States	Chicago Bulls	Iowa State (Jr.)
1	5	Mike Miller^{~}	SF/SG	United States	Orlando Magic (from Golden State)	Florida (So.)
1	6	DerMarr Johnson	SG/SF	United States	Atlanta Hawks	Cincinnati (Fr.)
1	7	Chris Mihm	C/PF	United States	Chicago Bulls (from Washington via Golden State; traded to Cleveland)	Texas (Jr.)
1	8	Jamal Crawford	SG	United States	Cleveland Cavaliers (traded to Chicago)	Michigan (Fr.)
1	9	Joel Przybilla	C	United States	Houston Rockets (traded to Milwaukee for Jason Collier and a future first-round pick)	Minnesota (So.)
1	10	Keyon Dooling	SG	United States	Orlando Magic (from Denver, traded to L.A. Clippers with Corey Maggette, Derek Strong and cash for a future first-round pick)	Missouri (So.)
1	11	Jérome Moïso	PF	France	Boston Celtics	UCLA (So.)
1	12	Etan Thomas	PF/C	United States	Dallas Mavericks	Syracuse (Sr.)
1	13	Courtney Alexander	SG	United States	Orlando Magic (traded to Dallas for a future first-round pick and cash)	Fresno State (Sr.)
1	14	Mateen Cleaves	PG	United States	Detroit Pistons	Michigan State (Sr.)
1	15	Jason Collier	C	United States	Milwaukee Bucks (traded with future first-round pick to Houston for Joel Przybilla)	Georgia Tech (Sr.)
1	16	Hedo Türkoğlu	SF/PF	Turkey	Sacramento Kings	Efes Pilsen (Turkey)
1	17	Desmond Mason	SF/SG	United States	Seattle SuperSonics	Oklahoma State (Sr.)
1	18	Quentin Richardson	SF/SG	United States	Los Angeles Clippers (from Toronto via New York, Philadelphia and Atlanta)	DePaul (So.)
1	19	Jamaal Magloire^{+}	PF/C	Canada	Charlotte Hornets	Kentucky (Sr.)
1	20	Speedy Claxton	PG	United States	Philadelphia 76ers	Hofstra (Sr.)
1	21	Morris Peterson	SF/SG	United States	Toronto Raptors (from Minnesota)	Michigan State (Sr.)
1	22	Donnell Harvey	SF	United States	New York Knicks (traded with John Wallace to Dallas for Erick Strickland and Pete Mickeal)	Florida (Fr.)
1	23	DeShawn Stevenson	SG	United States	Utah Jazz (from Miami)	Washington Union HS (Fresno, California)
1	24	Dalibor Bagarić	C	Croatia	Chicago Bulls (from San Antonio)	Benston Zagreb (Croatia)
1	25	Jake Tsakalidis	C	Greece	Phoenix Suns	AEK (Greece)
1	26	Mamadou N'Diaye	C	Senegal	Denver Nuggets (from Utah)	Auburn (Sr.)
1	27	Primož Brezec	C	Slovenia	Indiana Pacers	Union Olimpija (Slovenia)
1	28	Erick Barkley	PG	United States	Portland Trail Blazers	St. John's (So.)
1	29	Mark Madsen	PF	United States	Los Angeles Lakers	Stanford (Sr.)
2	30	Marko Jarić	G	FR Yugoslavia; Greece	Los Angeles Clippers	Paf Bologna (Italy)
2	31	Dan Langhi	PF	United States	Dallas Mavericks (from Chicago, traded to Houston for Eduardo Nájera and a future second-round draft pick)	Vanderbilt (Sr.)
2	32	A.J. Guyton	PG	United States	Chicago Bulls (from Golden State)	Indiana (Sr.)
2	33	Jake Voskuhl	C	United States	Chicago Bulls (from Vancouver via Houston)	Connecticut (Sr.)
2	34	Khalid El-Amin	PG	United States	Chicago Bulls (from Atlanta)	Connecticut (Jr.)
2	35	Mike Smith	F	United States	Washington Wizards	Louisiana-Monroe (Jr.)
2	36	Soumaila Samake	C	Mali	New Jersey Nets	Cincinnati Stuff (IBL)
2	37	Eddie House	SG	United States	Miami Heat (from Cleveland via Denver)	Arizona State (Sr.)
2	38	Eduardo Nájera	PF	Mexico	Houston Rockets (traded to Dallas with future second-round pick for Dan Langhi)	Oklahoma (Sr.)
2	39	Lavor Postell	SG	United States	New York Knicks (from Boston)	St. John's (Sr.)
2	40	Hanno Möttölä	SF/PF	Finland	Atlanta Hawks (from Denver)	Utah (Sr.)
2	41	Chris Carrawell^{#}	SG	United States	San Antonio Spurs (from Orlando)	Duke (Sr.)
2	42	Olumide Oyedeji	PF	Nigeria	Seattle SuperSonics	Würzburg (Germany)
2	43	Michael Redd^{*}	SG	United States	Milwaukee Bucks	Ohio State (Jr.)
2	44	Brian Cardinal	PF	United States	Detroit Pistons	Purdue (Sr.)
2	45	Jabari Smith	C	United States	Sacramento Kings	LSU (Sr.)
2	46	DeeAndre Hulett^{#}	SF	United States	Toronto Raptors	COS (So.)
2	47	Josip Sesar^{#}	G	Croatia	Seattle SuperSonics (traded to Boston for two future second-round picks)	Cibona Zagreb (Croatia)
2	48	Mark Karcher^{#}	PG	United States	Philadelphia 76ers	Temple (Jr.)
2	49	Jason Hart	PG	United States	Milwaukee Bucks (from Charlotte)	Syracuse (Sr.)
2	50	Kaniel Dickens	F	United States	Utah Jazz (from New York)	Idaho (Sr.)
2	51	Igor Rakočević	G	FR Yugoslavia	Minnesota Timberwolves	Red Star Belgrade (Serbia)
2	52	Ernest Brown	C	United States	Miami Heat	Indian Hills CC (Jr.)
2	53	Dan McClintock	C	United States	Denver Nuggets (from Phoenix)	Northern Arizona (Sr.)
2	54	Cory Hightower^{#}	G	United States	San Antonio Spurs (traded to L.A. Lakers for two future second-round picks)	Indian Hills CC (So.)
2	55	Chris Porter	F	United States	Golden State Warriors (from Utah)	Auburn (Sr.)
2	56	Jaquay Walls^{#}	G	United States	Indiana Pacers	Colorado (Sr.)
2	57	Scoonie Penn^{#}	G	United States	Atlanta Hawks (from Portland via Detroit)	Ohio State (Sr.)
2	58	Pete Mickeal^{#}	F	United States	Dallas Mavericks (from L.A. Lakers, traded with Erick Strickland to New York for John Wallace and Donnell Harvey)	Cincinnati (Sr.)

== Notable undrafted players ==
These players were not selected in the 2000 NBA draft but have played at least one game in the NBA.

Player	Position	Nationality	School/club team
Malik Allen	PF	United States	Villanova (Sr.)
Chris Andersen	C/PF	United States	New Mexico Slam (IBL)
Desmond Ferguson	G/F	United States	Detroit (Sr.)
Richie Frahm	SG	United States	Gonzaga (Sr.)
Eddie Gill	PG	United States	Weber State (Sr.)
Paul McPherson	G	United States	DePaul (Jr.)
Terrance Roberson	SF	United States	Fresno State (Sr.)
Pepe Sanchez	PG	Argentina	Temple (Sr.)
Alex Scales	G	United States	Oregon (Sr.)
Ime Udoka	SF	United States; Nigeria	Portland State (Sr.)

== Early entrants ==
=== College underclassmen ===
Following last year's slight dip of underclassmen, entering the new millennium, this draft saw a total of 55 underclassmen declare for the NBA draft initially. However, for collegiate players, seven of the nineteen total players that ultimately withdrew their names would be collegiate players (with Joshua Cross from Southern Illinois University, Jason Kapono from UCLA, Brian Merriweather from the University of Texas Pan-American, Jeryl Sasser from Southern Methodist University, Kenny Satterfield from the University of Cincinnati, Karim Shabazz from Providence College, and Joe White from Texas A&M University being the collegiate players that withdrew their names). Overall, including the high schools and international players with the 26 college underclassmen, there were 36 total players that would be considered underclassmen. That being said, the following college basketball players successfully applied for early draft entrance.

- (United States) Erick Barkley – G, St. John's (sophomore)
- (United States) Ernest Brown – C/F, Indian Hills CC (sophomore)
- (United States) Schea Cotton – G, Alabama (sophomore)
- (United States) Jamal Crawford – G, Michigan (freshman)
- (United States) Kaniel Dickens – F, Idaho (junior)
- (United States) Keyon Dooling – G, Missouri (sophomore)
- (United States) Khalid El-Amin – G, Connecticut (junior)
- (United States) Steve Eldridge – C, Henderson State (junior)
- (United States) Marcus Fizer – F, Iowa State (junior)
- (United States) Donnell Harvey – F, Florida (freshman)
- (United States) Cory Hightower – G/F, Indian Hills CC (sophomore)
- (United States) Rashaad Hines – G, Texas A&M–Corpus Christi (junior)
- (United States) Jimmie Hunter – G, Life (sophomore)
- (United States) DerMarr Johnson – F/G, Cincinnati (freshman)
- (United States) Mark Karcher – F, Temple (junior)
- (United States) Andre Mahorn – F, Utah State (junior)
- (United States) Paul McPherson – G, DePaul (junior)
- (United States) Chris Mihm – C, Texas (junior)
- (United States) Mike Miller – F, Florida (sophomore)
- (France) Jérôme Moïso – F, UCLA (sophomore)
- (United States) Joel Przybilla – C, Minnesota (sophomore)
- (United States) Michael Redd – G, Ohio State (junior)
- (United States) Quentin Richardson – G, DePaul (sophomore)
- (United States) JaRon Rush – F, UCLA (sophomore)
- (United States) Stromile Swift – F, LSU (sophomore)
- (United States) Derrick Worrell – F, Pittsburgh (junior)

=== High school players ===
This would be the sixth straight year in a row where players coming directly from high school can declare entry into the NBA draft after previously only allowing it one time back in 1975. The following high school players successfully applied for early draft entrance.

- (United States) Darius Miles – F, East St. Louis Senior High School (East St. Louis, Illinois)
- (United States) DeShawn Stevenson – G, Washington Union High School (Easton, California)

=== International players ===
In addition to the players below, twelve total international players from all over the world had previously declared entry for this year's draft, but ultimately removed their names from the listing for one reason or another. This year saw the likes of Yugoslavian-Italian Sani Bečirovič of the KK Union Olimpija, the Yugoslavian born Goran Ćakić of the KK Beobanka, the Greek born Antonis Fotsis of the Panathinaikos B.C., the Yugoslavian born Vlado Ilievski of the KK Partizan Belgrade, the Qatari born Yaseen Mahmood of the Al-Rayyan SC, the Turkish born Mehmet Okur of the Tofaş Spor Kulübü, the Greek-Russian born Lazaros Papadopoulos of the Iraklis Thessaloniki, the Turkish born Kaya Peker of the Pınar Karşıyaka, the Finnish born Teemu Rannikko of the Piiloset Turku, the Yugoslavian born Mladen Šekularac of the FMP Železnik, the Greek born Kostas Tsartsaris of the Peristeri B.C., and the Turkish born Kerem Tunçeri of the Efes Pilsen all initially declare their entry into the 2000 NBA draft, only to later withdraw from it for one reason or another. The following international players below, however, did successfully apply for early draft entrance.

- (Russia) Aleksey Savrasenko – C, Olympiacos (Greece)
- Dalibor Bagarić – C, Benston Zagreb (Croatia)
- Primož Brezec – C, Olimpija (Slovenia)
- (Georgia (country)) David Mushkudiani – F, Lukoil Academic (Bulgaria)
- (Federal Republic of Yugoslavia) Stevan Nađfeji – F, Beobanka (FR Yugoslavia)
- (Nigeria) Olumide Oyedeji – F, DJK Würzburg (Germany)
- Jake Tsakalidis – C, AEK (Greece)
- Hedo Türkoğlu – F, Efes Pilsen (Turkey)

== Invited attendees ==
The 2000 NBA draft is considered to be the 22nd NBA draft to have utilized what is properly considered the "green room" experience for NBA prospects. The NBA's green room is a staging area where anticipated draftees often sit with their families and representatives, waiting for their names to be called on draft night. Often being positioned either in front of or to the side of the podium (in this case, being positioned somewhere within the Target Center in Minneapolis), once a player heard his name, he would walk to the podium to shake hands and take promotional photos with the NBA commissioner. From there, the players often conducted interviews with various media outlets while backstage. From there, the players often conducted interviews with various media outlets while backstage. However, once the NBA draft started to air nationally on TV starting with the 1980 NBA draft, the green room evolved from players waiting to hear their name called and then shaking hands with these select players who were often called to the hotel to take promotional pictures with the NBA commissioner a day or two after the draft concluded to having players in real-time waiting to hear their names called up and then shaking hands with David Stern, the NBA's commissioner at the time.

The NBA compiled its list of green room invites through collective voting by the NBA's team presidents and general managers alike, which in this year's case belonged to only what they believed were the top 15 prospects at the time. Despite the lower amount of invites and successful players for this year's draft when compared to the previous year's draft, there would still be a notable amount of discrepancies involved between the missed invites of All-Stars Jamaal Magloire and Michael Redd for actual talents alongside Mike Miller and Keyon Dooling being missed out for Top 10 draft invites (alongside Jason Collier at pick 15), with very few draft choices feeling like they would even be worth the draft invite this year. Even so, the following players were invited to attend this year's draft festivities live and in person.

- (United States) Courtney Alexander – SF, Fresno State
- (United States) Mateen Cleaves – PG, Michigan State
- (United States) Jamal Crawford – SG, Michigan
- (United States) Marcus Fizer – SF/PF, Iowa State
- (United States) DerMarr Johnson – SG/SF, Cincinnati
- (United States) Kenyon Martin – PF, Cincinnati
- (United States) Chris Mihm – PF/C, Texas
- (United States) Darius Miles – SF/PF, East St. Louis High School (East St. Louis, Illinois)
- (France) Jérome Moïso – PF, UCLA
- (United States) Morris Peterson – SG/SF, Michigan State
- (United States) Joel Przybilla – C, Minnesota
- (United States) Quentin Richardson – SG/SF, DePaul
- (United States) Stromile Swift – PF/C, LSU
- (United States) Etan Thomas – PF/C, Syracuse
- / (Georgia (country)) Iakovos "Jake" Tsakalidis – C, AEK Athens B.C. (Greece)

== See also ==
- List of first overall NBA draft picks
