= 2000 NCAA Men's Basketball All-Americans =

- Awarded for: 1999–2000 NCAA Division I men's basketball season

The Consensus 2000 College Basketball All-American team, as determined by aggregating the results of four major All-American teams. To earn "consensus" status, a player must win honors from a majority of the following teams: the Associated Press, the USBWA, The Sporting News and the National Association of Basketball Coaches.

== 2000 Consensus All-America team ==
Consensus First Team
Player	Position	Class	Team
Chris Carrawell	F	Senior	Duke
Marcus Fizer	F	Junior	Iowa State
A. J. Guyton	G	Senior	Indiana
Kenyon Martin	C-F	Senior	Cincinnati
Chris Mihm	C	Junior	Texas
Troy Murphy	F	Sophomore	Notre Dame

Consensus Second Team
Player	Position	Class	Team
Courtney Alexander	G-F	Senior	Fresno State
Shane Battier	F	Junior	Duke
Mateen Cleaves	G	Senior	Michigan State
Scoonie Penn	G	Senior	Ohio State
Morris Peterson	F	Senior	Michigan State
Stromile Swift	C	Sophomore	Louisiana State

== Individual All-America teams ==
All-America Team
All-America Team	First team		Second team		Third team	
All-America Team	Player	School	Player	School	Player	School
Associated Press	Marcus Fizer	Iowa State	Courtney Alexander	Fresno State	Mark Madsen	Stanford
Associated Press	A. J. Guyton	Indiana	Shane Battier	Duke	Eduardo Nájera	Oklahoma
Associated Press	Kenyon Martin	Cincinnati	Chris Carrawell	Duke	Scoonie Penn	Ohio State
Associated Press	Chris Mihm	Texas	Mateen Cleaves	Michigan State	Pepe Sanchez	Temple
Associated Press	Troy Murphy	Notre Dame	Morris Peterson	Michigan State	Stromile Swift	LSU
USBWA	Chris Carrawell	Duke	Courtney Alexander	Fresno State	No third team	
USBWA	Marcus Fizer	Iowa State	Chris Mihm	Texas	No third team	
USBWA	A. J. Guyton	Indiana	Scoonie Penn	Ohio State	No third team	
USBWA	Kenyon Martin	Cincinnati	Morris Peterson	Michigan State	No third team	
USBWA	Troy Murphy	Notre Dame	Stromile Swift	LSU	No third team	
NABC	Chris Carrawell	Duke	Shane Battier	Duke	Mateen Cleaves	Michigan State
NABC	A. J. Guyton	Indiana	Mark Madsen	Stanford	Eduardo Nájera	Oklahoma
NABC	Marcus Fizer	Iowa State	Troy Murphy	Notre Dame	Pepe Sanchez	Temple
NABC	Kenyon Martin	Cincinnati	Scoonie Penn	Ohio State	Stromile Swift	LSU
NABC	Chris Mihm	Texas	Morris Peterson	Michigan State	Etan Thomas	Syracuse
Sporting News	Chris Carrawell	Duke	Shane Battier	Duke	No third team	
Sporting News	Mateen Cleaves	Michigan State	Marcus Fizer	Iowa State	No third team	
Sporting News	A. J. Guyton	Indiana	Chris Mihm	Texas	No third team	
Sporting News	Kenyon Martin	Cincinnati	Troy Murphy	Notre Dame	No third team	
Sporting News	Morris Peterson	Michigan State	Scoonie Penn	Ohio State	No third team	

AP Honorable Mention:

- Joe Adkins, Oklahoma State
- Gilbert Arenas, Arizona
- Erick Barkley, St. John's
- SirValiant Brown, George Washington
- Craig "Speedy" Claxton, Hofstra
- Eric Coley, Tulsa
- Mark Dickel, UNLV
- Juan Dixon, Maryland
- Khalid El-Amin, Connecticut
- Jason Gardner, Arizona
- Tony Harris, Tennessee
- Eddie House, Arizona State
- Casey Jacobsen, Stanford
- Dan Langhi, Vanderbilt
- Desmond Mason, Oklahoma State
- Pete Mickeal, Cincinnati
- Mike Miller, Florida
- Terence Morris, Maryland
- Chris Porter, Auburn
- Michael Redd, Ohio State
- Quentin Richardson, DePaul
- Doc Robinson, Auburn
- Etan Thomas, Syracuse
- Jason Williams, Duke
- Loren Woods, Arizona
- Michael Wright, Arizona
- Vincent Yarbrough, Tennessee
