= Jaquay Walls =

American basketball player (born 1978)

Personal information
- Born: April 3, 1978 (age 48) Brooklyn, New York, U.S.
- Listed height: 1.91 m (6 ft 3 in)

Career information
- High school: William E. Grady (Brooklyn, New York)
- College: Compton CC (1996–1998); Colorado (1998–2000)
- NBA draft: 2000: 2nd round, 56th overall pick
- Drafted by: Indiana Pacers
- Playing career: 2000–2003
- Position: Guard

Career history
- 2000–2001: Galatasaray S.K.
- 2001: Cincinnati Stuff
- 2001–2002: STB Le Havre
- 2002–2003: Golbey-Épinal
- Stats at Basketball Reference

Jaquay Walls (born April 3, 1978) is an American former professional basketball player who was selected by the Indiana Pacers in the second round (56th pick) of the 2000 NBA draft but who never played in the NBA and spent most of his career overseas in Turkey and in France.

He played two years as a shooting guard with Compton Community College before transferring to the University of Colorado for the rest of his college career. His junior year, Walls was named Honorable Mention All-Big 12 and made the conference's All-Newcomer team. As a senior, he was named First Team All-Big 12 by the coaches, and Second Team All-Conference by the associated press. He also set an NCAA record with 15 points in an overtime period.

He participated in training camp with the Pacers, but never played for them in an actual game or for any other NBA team (making Walls 1 of the 8 players from the 2000 NBA Draft to never play in the league). He was selected with the 77th pick in the 2001 NBDL draft by the Asheville Altitude, but once again, would never play a game for the team. That same year, Walls signed a contract to play in Turkey with Galatasaray Cafe Crown. He also played with the Cincinnati Stuff during the 2000–01 IBL season. He has since played in both the Pro A and Pro B Leagues in France.
