= Johnny Taylor (basketball) =

American basketball player and coach

Personal information
- Born: June 4, 1974 (age 52) Chattanooga, Tennessee, U.S.
- Listed height: 6 ft 9 in (2.06 m)
- Listed weight: 220 lb (100 kg)

Career information
- High school: Howard School of Academics and Technology (Chattanooga, Tennessee)
- College: Knoxville College (1993–1994); Indian Hills CC (1994–1995); Chattanooga (1995–1997)
- NBA draft: 1997: 1st round, 17th overall pick
- Drafted by: Orlando Magic
- Playing career: 1997–2012
- Position: Small forward
- Number: 17, 23
- Coaching career: 2014–present

Career history

Playing
- 1997–1998: Orlando Magic
- 1999–2000: Denver Nuggets
- 2000: Orlando Magic
- 2000–2001: Adecco Milano
- 2002: Santa Lucia Realty
- 2002: Roanoke Dazzle
- 2002–2003: Lokomotiv-Kuban
- 2003–2005: Triumph Lyubertsy
- 2005: Busan KT Sonicboom
- 2005–2006: Etosa Alicante
- 2006: Blue Stars
- 2006–2007: Dexia Mons-Hainaut
- 2007–2008: Mitsubishi Diamond Dolphins
- 2008–2010: Al-Ahli
- 2010–2011: Al-Ahli
- 2012: Al-Ahli

Coaching
- 2016–2017: VCU (Dir. of Player Development)
- 2017–2026: Lakeland / Osceola Magic (assistant)

Career highlights
- SoCon Player of the Year (1997); 2× First-team All-SoCon (1996, 1997); As assistant coach: NBA G League champion (2021)

Career NBA statistics
- Points: 256 (4.7 ppg)
- Rebounds: 120 (2.2 rpg)
- Assists: 26 (0.5 apg)
- Stats at NBA.com
- Stats at Basketball Reference

Johnny Antonio Taylor (born June 4, 1974) is an American professional basketball coach and former player who most recently served as the associate head coach for the Osceola Magic of the NBA G League.

Taylor played college basketball for the Chattanooga Mocs, earning So-Con Player of the Year Honors in 1997. He was the 17th overall pick in the 1997 NBA draft, playing for the Orlando Magic and Denver Nuggets during his NBA tenure. In 2000, Taylor continued his professional career overseas, playing with teams in Italy, Philippines, Russia, South Korea, Spain, Lebanon, Belgium, Japan, Bahrain, and the United Arab Emirates until he retired in 2012.

== Coaching career ==
Previously he served as the Player Development Coach for the VCU Men's Basketball team in Richmond, Virginia.
