= Jason Collier =

American basketball player (1977–2005)

Personal information
- Born: September 8, 1977 Springfield, Ohio, U.S.
- Died: October 15, 2005 (aged 28) Cumming, Georgia, U.S.
- Listed height: 7 ft 0 in (2.13 m)
- Listed weight: 260 lb (118 kg)

Career information
- High school: Catholic Central (Springfield, Ohio)
- College: Indiana (1996–1998); Georgia Tech (1998–2000)
- NBA draft: 2000: 1st round, 15th overall pick
- Drafted by: Milwaukee Bucks
- Playing career: 2000–2005
- Position: Center
- Number: 52, 40

Career history
- 2000–2003: Houston Rockets
- 2003–2004: Fayetteville Patriots
- 2004–2005: Atlanta Hawks

Career highlights
- All-NBDL First Team (2004); 2× Second-team All-ACC (1999, 2000); McDonald's All-American (1996); Second-team Parade All-American (1996); Ohio Mr. Basketball (1996)
- Stats at NBA.com
- Stats at Basketball Reference

Jason Jeffrey Collier (September 8, 1977 – October 15, 2005) was an American professional basketball player in the National Basketball Association (NBA).

== Early life ==
Collier led Catholic Central High School of his hometown Springfield, Ohio, to the 1996 Ohio State Basketball Championship, for which he was named 1996 Ohio Mr. Basketball.

== College career ==
After transferring from Indiana, Collier completed his college career at Georgia Tech.

== Professional career ==
Collier was drafted by the Milwaukee Bucks with the 15th overall pick of the 2000 NBA draft. He was traded on draft day to the Houston Rockets in exchange for their pick, Joel Przybilla. He then played for the Rockets and the Atlanta Hawks, averaging 5.6 points per game over his career.

With the Hawks, Collier dropped a career-high 22 points on March 12, 2004, in a 138–124 win against the Washington Wizards. Out of the 151 career games Collier played, this was one of only three times where he scored 20 or more points. Collier's final NBA game was played on April 20, 2005, in a 86–110 loss to the Philadelphia 76ers; this was also the Hawks' final game of the 2004–05 season as they missed the playoffs. Although he was the Hawks' starting center for that game, he only played for nine minutes and had two points and one rebound on 1-4 field goal shooting.

== Death and legacy ==
During the NBA off-season, Collier died suddenly at the age of 28 on October 15, 2005, in Cumming, Georgia. His autopsy indicated that he died because of a "sudden heart rhythm disturbance caused by an abnormally enlarged heart." Georgia's chief medical examiner, Kris Sperry, said Collier's heart "was above the accepted limits, even for a man of his size", and said the organ was about one and a half times the size it should have been. It was reported that he experienced shortness of breath before losing consciousness. Medical treatment was performed by emergency medical technicians, but Collier died en route to the hospital.

The Hawks wore permanent black shoulder patches on their uniforms to honor Collier. In his honor, the NBA Development League, on which Collier played for a year in the Fayetteville Patriots and was named to the All-NBA Development League Team, unveiled in the following season the Jason Collier Sportsmanship Award.

== NBA career statistics ==
Legend
GP	Games played	GS	Games started	MPG	Minutes per game
FG%	Field goal percentage	3P%	3-point field goal percentage	FT%	Free throw percentage
RPG	Rebounds per game	APG	Assists per game	SPG	Steals per game
BPG	Blocks per game	PPG	Points per game	**Bold**	Career high

=== Regular season ===
Year	Team	GP	GS	MPG	FG%	3P%	FT%	RPG	APG	SPG	BPG	PPG
2000–01	Houston	23	0	9.7	.380	.000	.708	1.6	.3	.1	.1	3.1
2001–02	Houston	25	2	14.6	.432	.000	.750	3.3	.4	.2	.2	4.2
2002–03	Houston	13	3	8.0	.472	.000	**1.000**	2.2	.1	.2	.1	2.8
2003–04	Atlanta	20	16	**27.3**	**.479**	.250	.788	**5.6**	**.9**	**.6**	**.6**	**11.3**
2004–05	Atlanta	**70**	**44**	13.5	.463	**.429**	.676	2.6	.3	.2	.2	5.7
Career		151	65	14.4	.455	.350	.738	2.9	.3	.2	.2	5.6

== See also ==
- List of basketball players who died during their careers
