= Chris Carrawell =

American basketball player

Duke Blue Devils
- Title: Associate head coach
- League: Atlantic Coast Conference

Personal information
- Born: November 25, 1977 (age 48) St. Louis, Missouri, U.S.
- Listed height: 6 ft 6 in (1.98 m)
- Listed weight: 220 lb (100 kg)

Career information
- High school: Cardinal Ritter College Prep (St. Louis, Missouri)
- College: Duke (1996–2000)
- NBA draft: 2000: 2nd round, 41st overall pick
- Drafted by: San Antonio Spurs
- Playing career: 2000–2007
- Position: Shooting guard / small forward
- Coaching career: 2011–present

Career history

Playing
- 2000–2001: Media Broker Messina
- 2001–2002: Asheville Altitude
- 2002: Toritos de Cayey
- 2002–2003: Žalgiris Kaunas
- 2003: Brandt Hagen
- 2003–2004: Sydney Kings
- 2005–2006: Rochester Razorsharks
- 2006: Gaiteros del Zulia
- 2006–2007: Matrixx Magixx

Coaching
- 2011–2014: Springfield Armor (assistant)
- 2014–2018: Marquette (assistant)
- 2018–2021: Duke (assistant)
- 2021–present: Duke (associate HC)

Career highlights
- As player: Dutch Cup winner (2007); ABA MVP (2006); ABA All-Star (2006); ABA championship MVP (2006); ABA champion (2006); Consensus first-team All-American (2000); ACC Player of the Year (2000); First-team All-ACC (2000); Third-team All-ACC (1999); Fourth-team Parade All-American (1995)
- Stats at Basketball Reference
Medals
Men's basketball
Representing United States
Summer Universiade
| Gold medal – first place | 1999 Palma | Team competition |

Chris Carrawell (born November 25, 1977) is a retired American professional basketball player and coach who is currently the associate head coach for the Duke Blue Devils. He is best known for his college career at Duke, where he was a consensus All-American and ACC Player of the Year in 2000.

== High school career ==
Born in a rough inner city neighborhood in north St. Louis and growing up without his father (he saw him for the first time in 1999), Carrawell attended high school at Cardinal Ritter College Prep in St. Louis. Among his teammates were future NBA players Loren Woods and Jahidi White. In four years on the Cardinal Ritter varsity, he led the team to an overall 80–13 record, including a three-year undefeated streak at home. As a sophomore he posted averages of 19.4 points, 10.1 rebounds, 5.4 assists, 5.5 steals and 2.8 blocks per game. Carrawell was a USA today Top 40 All American going into his junior season, where he averaged 20.6 points and 10 rebounds per game as Cardinal Ritter won the state's Class AA championship. The following season, Cardinal Ritter defended its state title. Carrawell again led the team, averaging 17.4 points, 8.2 rebounds and 5.5 assists per game. Carrawell was named conference Player of the Year twice, earned Central Region honors as Gatorade Player of the Year, and was a fourth-team Parade All-American. He set school career records for points (2,087), rebounds (1,076), and assists (555). Cardinal Ritter made USA Today's list of the top 25 high school teams in the country twice during Carrawell's prep career.

== College career ==
=== Freshman season (1996–97) ===
Carrawell was recruited by Duke University's Mike Krzyzewski as the third most-prized piece of the class of 2000. He started 12 times out of the 31 games he appeared in during his freshman season (1996–97). He shot 57.6% from the field, averaging 5.5 points per game. He ranked third on the team in offensive rebounds with 47, and on a team that mainly featured perimeter shooting, led the team in dunks with 22. Some highlights as a Duke freshman in 1996–97 include Carrawell defending Wake Forest's center Tim Duncan, blocking a key Wake Forest shot down the stretch and led Duke to the win.

=== Sophomore season (1997–98) ===
As a sophomore in the 1997–98 season, Carrawell appeared mostly as a reserve with ten starts as Duke posted a 32–4 mark, finishing in the Elite Eight. Carrawell, having scored in double figures 22 times, was fourth of the team's scorers with 10.1 points per game, performing well in two losses to North Carolina, scoring 19 in the first meeting with UNC and 18 in the ACC tournament game. He also ranked fourth on the team in rebounding, averaging 3.1 rebounds per game. Carrawell had offseason surgery on his left shoulder prior to the start of his sophomore season and missed four games due to a strained lower back.

=== Junior season (1998–99) ===
Carrawell contributed 9.9 points per game as a junior, starting all the games and helping his team to reach the Final Four in the 1998–99 season. He ranked third in rebounds and recorded 130 assists to place second on a team with several future NBA players. During the 39-game 1998–99 season, Carrawell started every game for a Duke team that was undefeated in the ACC and that fell to the University of Connecticut in the 1999 national title game. For these efforts, he was named Third-Team All ACC.

=== Senior season (1999–00) ===
Carrawell then averaged 16.9 points, 6.1 rebounds, 3.2 assists, 1.6 fouls, 0.9 steals, 2 turnovers, 1.1 blocks, makes 6 of 12.4 field goals (48%), 0.8 of 2.2 three-pointers (36%) and 4.1 of 5.2 free throws (78%) in 35.6 minutes per game in his senior season (all starts). Being second in his team in scoring, rebound and assists, Carrawell led his team to finish with a record of 29–5, win the ACC Tournament championship, a number one seed, and a Sweet 16 stint in the NCAA tournament. He was 2000 ACC Player of the Year with Associated Press and First Team All-American honors.

=== Records ===
Strong enough and mobile enough to guard several positions, Carrawell was also a two-time All-ACC selection in his career with the Blue Devils. He is tied for 27th on the all-time scoring list at Duke with 1,455 career points and also ranks 14th in school history with 0.8 blocks per game and tied for sixth with 116 overall wins. Carrawell helped the Blue Devils to succeed in the ACC during his tenure, finishing his career with 66 conference victories, second most all-time by a Duke player. Along with teammate Nate James, he is one of only two players in ACC history to play on teams that won four straight ACC regular-season championships. He was the only player to play in each of Duke's ACC-record 30 straight league wins. During Carrawell's collegiate career, the Blue Devils compiled a record of 133–24, including a 58–6 mark in ACC play. In 136 college games, he averaged 10.7 points, 4.5 rebounds, 2.3 assists in 26.1 minutes.

=== College statistics ===
| Year | Team | GP | GS | MPG | FG% | 3P% | FT% | RPG | APG | SPG | BPG | PPG |
|---|---|---|---|---|---|---|---|---|---|---|---|---|
| 1996–97 | Duke | 31 | 12 | 16.2 | .576 | .000 | .574 | 3.1 | 1.1 | 0.7 | 0.7 | 5.5 |
| 1997–98 | Duke | 32 | 10 | 22.2 | .482 | .368 | .641 | 3.7 | 1.1 | 0.6 | 0.7 | 10.1 |
| 1998–99 | Duke | 39 | 39 | 28.6 | .454 | .345 | .577 | 4.8 | 3.3 | 0.8 | 0.9 | 9.9 |
| 1999–00 | Duke | 34 | 34 | 35.6 | .486 | .377 | .778 | 6.1 | 3.2 | 1.0 | 1.1 | 16.9 |
| Career | | 136 | 95 | 26.0 | .486 | .360 | .667 | 4.5 | 2.3 | 0.8 | 0.8 | 10.7 |

== Professional career ==
Carrawell was selected by the San Antonio Spurs in the second round (41st pick overall) of the 2000 NBA draft. He played overseas after graduating from Duke. He played a year in Italy before returning to the United States to play in the inaugural season of the D League with the Asheville Altitude. In 56 games for the Altitude, he averaged 7.3 points, 3.6 rebounds, 1.8 assists in 22.9 minutes. Over the next six years, he played in Lithuania for Žalgiris Kaunas, Germany, Australia for the Sydney Kings, the Philippines for the Alaska Aces, and the American Basketball Association. While in the ABA he won the 2006 MVP Award, an ABA Championship (2006) and the 2006 ABA Championship MVP award. Carrawell retired after playing in the Netherlands in 2007 where his team finished second after losing in the championship finals.

With his retirement in 2007, Carrawell became the first player of the new millennium to be drafted into the NBA but never play a single game in the league. All 40 players that were drafted before Carrawell played at least one game in the league. There were also 7 other players from the 2000 NBA Draft who never played in the league, one of them being Cory Hightower who was also selected by the Spurs in that draft.

== Coaching career ==
Carrawell then spent four years at Duke in a variety of administrative roles. After being hired in 2007–08 as the Duke Athletics Outreach Coordinator, he became a graduate assistant and head team manager from 2008–2010 then became an assistant video coordinator and assistant strength and conditioning coach 2010–11. While serving as a special assistant to the Duke women's team in 2011, the New Jersey Nets hired him to be an assistant coach to Bob MacKinnon Jr. for their NBA D League affiliate in Springfield, Massachusetts called the Springfield Armor. In 2014, Carrawell was hired to Marquette's coaching staff under his former Duke teammate Steve Wojciechowski.

After four years as an assistant coach at Marquette, Carrawell accepted the same position at his alma mater, Duke, on March 30. He replaced Jeff Capel as an assistant, who became the head coach at the University of Pittsburgh.

== Personal life ==
Carrawell resides in Mebane with his wife Keisha Royster-Carrawell. He has two sons, Caleb and Christian. He earned a degree in sociology from Duke.
