= Terrance Roberson =

American basketball player (born 1976)

Personal information
- Born: December 30, 1976 (age 49) Saginaw, Michigan, U.S.
- Listed height: 6 ft 7 in (2.01 m)
- Listed weight: 215 lb (98 kg)

Career information
- High school: Buena Vista (Saginaw, Michigan)
- College: Fresno State (1996–2000)
- NBA draft: 2000: undrafted
- Playing career: 2000–2011
- Position: Small forward
- Number: 8

Career history
- 2000: Charlotte Hornets
- 2000–2001: Idaho Stampede
- 2000–2001: Trenton Shooting Stars
- 2001: Pennsylvania ValleyDawgs
- 2001–2002: Huntsville Flight
- 2002: Greenville Groove
- 2002: Pennsylvania ValleyDawgs
- 2002–2003: Pallacanestro Trieste
- 2003–2004: Pallacanestro Reggiana
- 2004: Tekelspor
- 2004–2005: Kyiv
- 2005: Maccabi Haifa
- 2005–2006: Pallacanestro Reggiana
- 2006–2007: Kouvot Kouvola
- 2008–2009: Galgos de Tijuana
- 2009: Roche-la-Moliere
- 2009: SAM Massagno Basket
- 2009–2010: CSU Sibiu
- 2011: Halifax Rainmen

Career highlights
- Ukrainian League champion (2005); 3× Second-team Parade All-American (1993, 1994, 1995)
- Stats at NBA.com
- Stats at Basketball Reference

Terrance Roberson (born December 30, 1976) is an American former professional basketball player. At 6'7", he played as a small forward.

Roberson played at California State University, Fresno, averaging 16.3 points per game during his senior season (1999–2000). In 2000, he was selected by the Idaho Stampede in the third round of the Continental Basketball Association draft. Although never drafted by a National Basketball Association team, he signed as a free agent and appeared in three games for the Charlotte Hornets of the NBA in 2000 (his only time in the NBA). In those three games, Roberson played a total of 12 minutes and recorded 1 assist, 1 rebound but no points. His final game was on November 29, 2000, in a 103 - 79 win over the Toronto Raptors where he recorded 1 turnover and no other stats. He last played for the Halifax Rainmen during the 2011 season.
