= Cory Hightower =

American basketball player (born 1979)

Personal information
- Born: June 30, 1979 (age 47) Flint, Michigan, U.S.
- Listed height: 6 ft 8 in (2.03 m)
- Listed weight: 224.4 lb (102 kg)

Career information
- High school: Flint Northwestern (Flint, Michigan); Mount Zion Christian Academy (Durham, North Carolina)
- College: Indian Hills CC (1998–2000)
- NBA draft: 2000: 2nd round, 54th overall pick
- Drafted by: San Antonio Spurs
- Playing career: 2000–2012
- Position: Shooting guard / small forward

Career history
- 2000–2001: Gary Steelheads
- 2001: Harlem Globetrotters
- 2001–2002: Gary Steelheads
- 2002: Rockford Lightning
- 2002–2003: Great Lakes Storm
- 2003–2004: Yakima Sun Kings
- 2004–2005: Michigan Mayhem
- 2005: Marinos de Anzoátegui
- 2011–2012: Carolina Cougars

Career highlights
- Second-team Parade All-American (1998)
- Stats at Basketball Reference

Cory Hightower (born July 30, 1979) is an American professional basketball player who was selected by the San Antonio Spurs in the second round (54th pick) in the 2000 NBA draft.

He played two years as a guard/forward with Indian Hills Community College, and had committed to play at Texas Christian University, but decided to leave early to declare for the draft. While at Indian Hills, Hightower was named NJCAA Tournament MVP his freshman year, and was named a First Team NJCAA All-American his sophomore year.

His draft rights were traded by the Spurs to the Los Angeles Lakers on the day of the draft. Hightower averaged 17 points per game for the Lakers in NBA Summer League and pre-season, but was eventually cut from the NBA Championship team to make room for a point guard. Although Hightower's professional basketball career lasted 12 years, he never played a game in the NBA, making him 1 of 8 players from the 2000 NBA Draft to never play in the league. Hightower and fellow 2000 NBA Draftee Chris Carrawell were the only players that the Spurs drafted that year, and neither one of them ever played a game in the league.

He split the 2000–01 season in the CBA with the Gary Steelheads before joining the Harlem Globetrotters. Participated in training camp with the Charlotte Hornets in 2001 before being released. He returned to the CBA in 2002 and played once again with the Gary Steelheads and later, the Rockford Lightning. Hightower would continue to leap around the CBA for the next few years, playing for the Great Lakes Storm, Yakima Sun Kings, and Michigan Mayhem. In 2004, Hightower began playing overseas for teams such as Marinos de Anzoátegui in Venezuela. Hightower also played for the Albany Patroons of the United States Basketball League.
