= Mike Smith (basketball, born 1976) =

American basketball player (born 1976)

Personal information
- Born: April 15, 1976 (age 50) West Monroe, Louisiana, U.S.
- Listed height: 6 ft 8 in (2.03 m)
- Listed weight: 195 lb (88 kg)

Career information
- High school: West Monroe (West Monroe, Louisiana)
- College: Bossier Parish CC (1996–1998); Louisiana–Monroe (1998–2000)
- NBA draft: 2000: 2nd round, 35th overall pick
- Drafted by: Washington Wizards
- Playing career: 2000–2013
- Position: Small forward / power forward
- Number: 40

Career history
- 2000–2001: Washington Wizards
- 2001–2002: Fayetteville Patriots
- 2002: Keravnos
- 2002–2003: Near East
- 2003–2004: Reflex Železnik
- 2004–2005: JA Vichy
- 2005: Trotamundos de Carabobo
- 2005–2006: Stade Clermontois BA
- 2006–2007: Strasbourg IG
- 2007–2010: Halcones Córdoba
- 2010–2011: Lechugueros de León
- 2011: Halcones Córdoba
- 2011: Lechugueros de León
- 2011: Halcones de Xalapa
- 2011–2012: Sokol Antofagasta
- 2012: Quilmes de Mar del Plata
- 2012–2013: Lechugueros de León
- 2013: Choriceros de Camargo

Career highlights
- Southland Player of the Year (2000); 2× First-team All-Southland (1999, 2000); Southland Newcomer of the Year (1999)
- Stats at NBA.com
- Stats at Basketball Reference

Michael Smith (born April 15, 1976) is an American former professional basketball player.

== Career ==
A 6'8" forward, Smith attended the University of Louisiana at Monroe before being selected by the Washington Wizards in the second round of the 2000 NBA draft. At that time, the Wizards also had an unrelated Michael Smith on the roster. Smith played 1 season in the NBA, playing 17 games for the Wizards during the 2000–01 NBA season and averaged 3.0 points per game. His final NBA game was played on April 18, 2001, in a 92–98 loss to the Toronto Raptors where he recorded 3 points, 1 assist and 1 rebound.

== Career statistics ==
Legend
| GP | Games played | GS | Games started | MPG | Minutes per game |
| FG% | Field goal percentage | 3P% | 3-point field goal percentage | FT% | Free throw percentage |
| RPG | Rebounds per game | APG | Assists per game | SPG | Steals per game |
| BPG | Blocks per game | PPG | Points per game | **Bold** | Career high |

=== NBA ===
==== Regular season ====
| Year | Team | GP | GS | MPG | FG% | 3P% | FT% | RPG | APG | SPG | BPG | PPG |
|---|---|---|---|---|---|---|---|---|---|---|---|---|
| 2000–01 | Washington | 17 | — | 10.6 | .322 | .167 | .625 | 1.3 | 0.6 | 0.4 | 0.2 | 3.0 |
