= Jérôme Moïso =

French basketball player (born 1978)

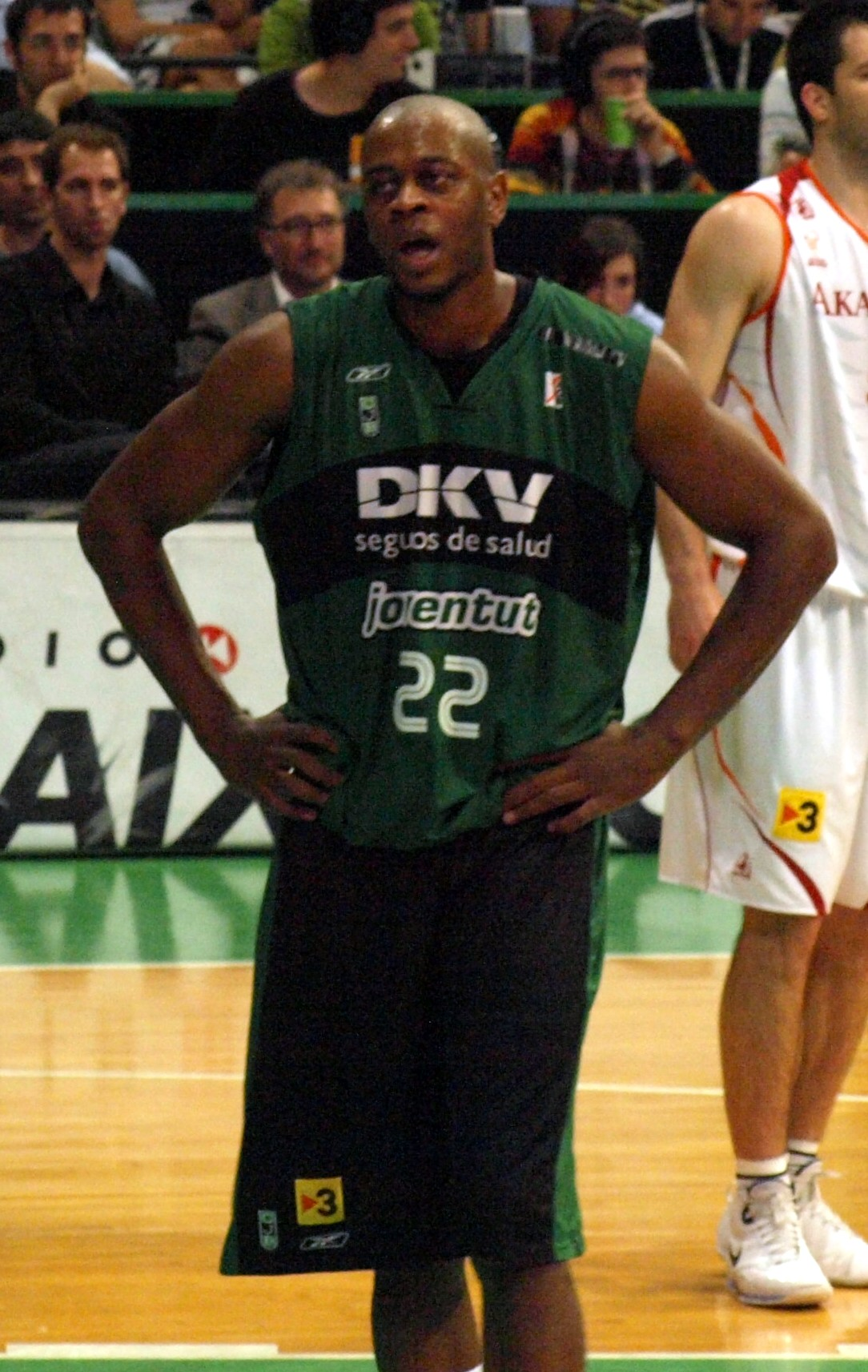

Personal information
- Born: 15 June 1978 (age 48) Paris, France
- Listed height: 6 ft 10 in (2.08 m)
- Listed weight: 260 lb (118 kg)

Career information
- High school: Milford Academy (Milford, Connecticut)
- College: UCLA (1998–2000)
- NBA draft: 2000: 1st round, 11th overall pick
- Drafted by: Boston Celtics
- Playing career: 2000–2013
- Position: Power forward / center
- Number: 5, 6, 7

Career history
- 2000–2001: Boston Celtics
- 2001–2002: Charlotte Hornets
- 2002–2003: New Orleans Hornets
- 2003–2005: Toronto Raptors
- 2004–2005: New Jersey Nets
- 2005: Cleveland Cavaliers
- 2006: Lottomatica Roma
- 2006–2007: Climamio Bologna
- 2007: Real Madrid
- 2007–2008: DKV Joventut
- 2008: Khimki BC
- 2008–2009: DKV Joventut
- 2009–2010: Bilbao Basket
- 2010–2011: Jiangsu Dragons
- 2011–2012: BC Dnipro
- 2013: Piratas de Quebradillas
- Stats at NBA.com
- Stats at Basketball Reference
Medals
Men's basketball
Representing France
European U-18 Championship
Silver medal – second place	1996 France	U-18 Team

Jérôme Moïso (born 15 June 1978) is a French former professional basketball player who played in the National Basketball Association (NBA) and other top leagues. He played college basketball for the UCLA Bruins.

== Professional career ==
A forward-center, Moïso was selected 11th overall in the 2000 NBA draft by the Celtics in 2000, and played for the NBA clubs the Boston Celtics, Charlotte Hornets, New Orleans Hornets, Toronto Raptors, New Jersey Nets and Cleveland Cavaliers. He was also traded from the Celtics to the Philadelphia 76ers, though he never played for them. In total, Moïso played 145 games in his NBA career, starting in 3 of them, with averages of 2.7 points and 2.7 rebounds. His best season came in 2002-03 when he established career highs in points per game (4.0) and rebounds per game (3.5) for the New Orleans Hornets.

He would end his NBA career as a Cavalier, only playing 4 games for the team. Moïso's final NBA game was played on February 16, 2005, in a 111–89 win over the Atlanta Hawks, where he recorded only 2 points and 1 rebound.

He has also played in Europe with the Italian League clubs Lottomatica Roma and Climamio Bologna, the Spanish ACB League clubs Real Madrid, DKV Joventut, and Bilbao Basket, and the Russian Super League club Khimki BC.

== Post-professional career ==
Following his retirement from professional basketball, Moïso transitioned into life coaching and personal development work. According to his official website, he works as a transformational life coach, focusing on helping high-achieving individuals address internal barriers such as guilt, religious conditioning, and self-doubt. His clientele includes senior professionals, creatives, and high-potential athletes.

Moïso is also an author. In his memoir, Playing Small in a Big Man's World, he reflects on his journey from being selected in the first round of the 2000 NBA draft to experiencing financial and personal setbacks following his basketball career. The book discusses themes of identity, external validation, and personal growth, which form the basis of his coaching philosophy.

== Personal life ==
Moïso was born in Paris and grew up in Guadeloupe.
