= Paul McPherson =

American basketball player (born 1978)

Personal information
- Born: July 3, 1978 (age 48) Chicago, Illinois
- Listed height: 6 ft 4 in (1.93 m)
- Listed weight: 210 lb (95 kg)

Career information
- High school: South Shore (Chicago, Illinois)
- College: Tallahassee CC (1996–1997); Kennedy–King (1998–1999); DePaul (1999–2000)
- NBA draft: 2000: undrafted
- Playing career: 2000–2008
- Position: Point guard
- Number: 23

Career history
- 2000–2001: Phoenix Suns
- 2001: Golden State Warriors
- 2001–2002: Phoenix Eclipse
- 2002–2003: Yakima Sun Kings
- 2003–2004: Rockford Lightning
- 2004: Idaho Stampede
- 2004–2005: Gary Steelheads
- 2005: Pallacanestro Reggiana
- 2005–2007: Basket Livorno
- 2007–2008: Hyères-Toulon
- 2008: BC Rustavi
- 2008: Monte Hermoso

Career statistics
- Points: 262 (4.8 ppg)
- Rebounds: 79 (1.4 rpg)
- Assists: 38 (0.7 apg)
- Stats at NBA.com
- Stats at Basketball Reference

Paul L. McPherson (born July 3, 1978) is an American former professional basketball player.

A 6-foot-4-inch (1.93 m) shooting guard from Chicago's South Shore High School, McPherson played at Tallahassee Community College, Kennedy-King College, and DePaul University before being signed by the Phoenix Suns of the National Basketball Association. McPherson played a total of 55 games in his NBA career, all during the 2000–01 NBA season, playing 33 games with the Suns and 22 with the Golden State Warriors. His career averages are 4.8 points per game and 1.4 rebounds per game. His final NBA game was played on April 18, 2001, in an 81 - 95 loss to the Vancouver Grizzlies where he played 10 and half minutes and the only stat he recorded was 1 rebound.

After his brief stint in the NBA, McPherson played in the American minor leagues and overseas. He also spent part of the 2002-2003 basketball season touring with the Harlem Globetrotters.

Furthermore. he reached the Semifinal of the Nike King of the World Battleground 2004 and won $10000, but could not get to the final.

Paul McPherson, was charged with four counts of unlawful sexual activity with a minor, three counts of contributing to the delinquency of a minor and one count each of possession of less than 20 grams of marijuana and unlawful use of a two-way communications device, according to his jail and arrest report. While McPherson was serving as the Englewood High School Boys Basketball coach and as the school's security guard.
