= Courtney Alexander =

American basketball player (born 1977)

Personal information
- Born: April 27, 1977 (age 49) Bridgeport, Connecticut, U.S.
- Listed height: 6 ft 5 in (1.96 m)
- Listed weight: 205 lb (93 kg)

Career information
- High school: Charles E. Jordan (Durham, North Carolina)
- College: Virginia (1995–1997); Fresno State (1998–2000)
- NBA draft: 2000: 1st round, 13th overall pick
- Drafted by: Orlando Magic
- Playing career: 2000–2004
- Position: Point guard / shooting guard
- Number: 8, 4, 32

Career history
- 2000–2001: Dallas Mavericks
- 2001–2002: Washington Wizards
- 2002–2004: New Orleans Hornets

Career highlights
- NBA All-Rookie Second Team (2001); Consensus second-team All-American (2000); NCAA scoring champion (2000); WAC Player of the Year (2000); 2× First-team All-WAC (1999, 2000); Third-team Parade All-American (1995)
- Stats at NBA.com
- Stats at Basketball Reference

Courtney Jason Alexander (born April 27, 1977) is an American former professional basketball player. He is the cousin of basketball hall of famer Grant Hill. His son, Courtney Jason Alexander II, played college basketball at Tennessee Tech from 2015–2019.

== Career ==
After playing high school basketball at Masuk High School in Monroe, Connecticut, Alexander moved to Durham, North Carolina, to play for C. E. Jordan High School to finish his high school career. A shooting guard, he played college basketball at the University of Virginia and Fresno State, and he led the nation in scoring in the 1999–2000 season at Fresno State.

He was selected by the Orlando Magic with the 13th overall pick in the 2000 NBA draft; his rights were traded to the Dallas Mavericks on the same day. He played for the Mavericks before being traded during his rookie season to the Washington Wizards, where he played until 2002. He was named to the All-Rookie second team. He was then traded in the offseason to the New Orleans Hornets. A highlight of his career was a 33-point effort for the Wizards against the Toronto Raptors on April 18, 2001, when Richard Hamilton was out with injuries.

He suffered a tear of his Achilles' tendon in 2003 while with the Hornets, and after rehabilitating his injury, he signed with the Sacramento Kings but was released before ever playing a game for them due to an injury to the tendons in his left foot. On October 8, 2006, Alexander was signed by the Denver Nuggets after being out of the league for three seasons, but was waived on October 15.

Because of his 3-year hiatus and being waived in October 2006 by the Nuggets before ever playing a game for them, Alexander's final NBA game was actually on May 2, 2003, in Game 6 of the Eastern Conference first round against the Philadelphia 76ers. In that game, he only recorded 2 points as the Hornets wrist the series 4–2 and were eliminated from the playoffs.

== NBA career statistics ==
Legend
GP	Games played	GS	Games started	MPG	Minutes per game
FG%	Field goal percentage	3P%	3-point field goal percentage	FT%	Free throw percentage
RPG	Rebounds per game	APG	Assists per game	SPG	Steals per game
BPG	Blocks per game	PPG	Points per game	**Bold**	Career high

=== Regular season ===
Year	Team	GP	GS	MPG	FG%	3P%	FT%	RPG	APG	SPG	BPG	PPG
2000–01	Dallas	38	6	12.4	.348	.300	.733	1.7	.6	.4	**.1**	4.2
2000–01	Washington	27	18	**33.7**	.448	**.389**	**.857**	**3.0**	**1.5**	**1.1**	**.1**	**17.0**
2001–02	Washington	56	**28**	23.7	**.470**	.278	.810	2.6	**1.5**	.6	**.1**	9.8
2002–03	New Orleans	**66**	7	20.6	.382	.333	.808	1.8	1.2	.5	**.1**	7.9
Career		187	59	21.7	.422	.339	.813	2.2	1.2	.6	.1	9.0

=== Playoffs ===
Year	Team	GP	GS	MPG	FG%	3P%	FT%	RPG	APG	SPG	BPG	PPG
2003	New Orleans	5	0	7.8	.438	1.000	.750	.8	.2	.4	.0	3.6
Career		5	0	7.8	.438	1.000	.750	.8	.2	.4	.0	3.6
