= Dalibor Bagarić =

Croatian basketball player (born 1980)

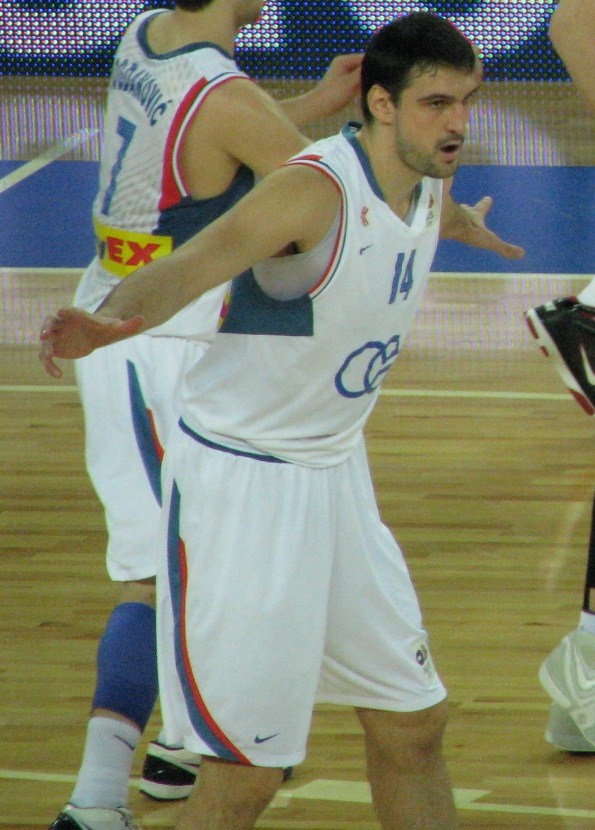
- Dalibor Bagarić with Cibona in 2010.

Personal information
- Born: 7 February 1980 (age 46) Munich, West Germany
- Listed height: 7 ft 1 in (2.16 m)
- Listed weight: 290 lb (132 kg)

Career information
- NBA draft: 2000: 1st round, 24th overall pick
- Drafted by: Chicago Bulls
- Playing career: 1996–2016
- Position: Center
- Number: 44, 11

Career history
- 1996–1997: Karlovac
- 1997–1998: Benston Zagreb
- 1998–1999: Cibona
- 1999–2000: Benston Zagreb
- 2000–2003: Chicago Bulls
- 2003–2004: Olympiacos
- 2004–2006: Fortitudo Bologna
- 2006–2007: Akasvayu Girona
- 2007–2009: Fortitudo Bologna
- 2009–2010: Cibona
- 2010: Dubrava
- 2010–2011: Maroussi
- 2011: Blancos de Rueda Valladolid
- 2011–2012: Cedevita
- 2012: Sporting Al Riyadi Beirut
- 2012–2013: Amchit Club
- 2013: KK Zabok
- 2013: Étoile Sportive du Sahel
- 2014: KK Zabok
- 2014: Al-Ahli Benghazi
- 2014–2015: Brose Baskets Bamberg

Career highlights
- 2× Croatian League champion (1999, 2010); 2× Croatian Cup winner (1999, 2012); Italian League champion (2005); Italian Supercup winner (2005); German League champion (2015); FIBA EuroCup champion (2007)

Career NBA statistics
- Points: 251 (2.6 ppg)
- Rebounds: 238 (2.5 rpg)
- Assists: 37 (0.4 apg)
- Stats at NBA.com
- Stats at Basketball Reference
Medals
Men's basketball
Representing Croatia
European U-18 Championship
Gold medal – first place	1996 France	U-18 Team
European Championship for Cadets
Gold medal – first place	1995 Portugal	U-16 Team

Dalibor Bagarić (born 7 February 1980) is a Croatian former professional basketball player. He had a stint with the NBA's Chicago Bulls from 2000 to 2003.

== Professional career ==
A 7-foot-1-inch (2.16 m) center born in Munich, West Germany, Bagarić had averaged 18.3 points and 10.4 rebounds per game for the Croatian team Benston Zagreb before the Bulls selected him with the 24th pick in the 2000 NBA draft. Bagarić never averaged more than 2.6 points and 2.5 rebounds per game during his time with the Bulls.

He returned to Europe after the Bulls bought out his contract in 2003, and began playing for the Greek club Olympiacos. He played only 10 games with the Bulls during the 2002 - 2003 season, with his final NBA game ever being on 15 April 2003 in a 115 - 106 win over the Philadelphia 76ers. Bagarić played for 3 minutes and the only stat he recorded was 2 points.

In 2004, he moved to Italian club Fortitudo Bologna. In the summer of 2006, he transferred to CB Girona of the Spanish ACB league. In September 2007 he returned to Fortitudo Bologna after signing on a one-year contract. In November 2010 he signed with Maroussi. At the beginning of the 2011–12 season, Bagarić signed with CB Valladolid, but left the club in late November, returning to Croatia and signing with Cedevita. In September 2012, he signed a one-month deal with Sporting Al Riyadi Beirut in Lebanon. In December 2012, he signed with the Lebanese club Amchit. In the 2013–14 season, he played for Étoile Sportive du Sahel in Tunisia, KK Zabok in Croatia and Al-Ahli Benghazi in Libya. In 2014, he signed with Brose Baskets Bamberg of the Basketball Bundesliga where he signed, on 2 December 2014, a contract extension.

On 9 June 2016 Bagarić announced his retirement.

== National team career ==
With the junior national teams of Croatia, Bagarić won the gold medal at the 1996 FIBA Europe Under-18 Championship.

He was also a member of the senior Croatian national basketball team. He has played at the EuroBasket 2003 and EuroBasket 2005.

== Career statistics ==
Legend
GP	Games played	GS	Games started	MPG	Minutes per game
FG%	Field goal percentage	3P%	3-point field goal percentage	FT%	Free throw percentage
RPG	Rebounds per game	APG	Assists per game	SPG	Steals per game
BPG	Blocks per game	PPG	Points per game	**Bold**	Career high

=== NBA ===
==== Regular season ====
Year	Team	GP	GS	MPG	FG%	3P%	FT%	RPG	APG	SPG	BPG	PPG
2000–01	Chicago	35	0	7.4	.262	.000	.464	1.6	.3	**.3**	**.5**	1.3
2001–02	Chicago	**50**	0	**12.8**	**.404**	.000	.586	**3.2**	**.5**	**.3**	**.5**	**3.7**
2002–03	Chicago	10	0	7.6	.308	–	**.750**	2.0	.4	**.3**	.3	1.9
Career		95	0	10.2	.361	.000	.559	2.5	.4	.3	.5	2.6
