= Ernest Brown (basketball) =

American basketball player (born 1979)

Personal information
- Born: May 17, 1979 (age 47) The Bronx, New York, U.S.
- Listed height: 7 ft 0 in (2.13 m)
- Listed weight: 244 lb (111 kg)

Career information
- High school: St. Raymond (The Bronx, New York)
- College: Indian Hills CC (1999–2000)
- NBA draft: 2000: 2nd round, 52nd overall pick
- Drafted by: Miami Heat
- Position: Center
- Number: 52

Career history
- 2001–2002: Miami Heat
- 2007–2008: Barangay Ginebra Kings

Career highlights
- All-NBDL Second Team (2003)
- Stats at NBA.com
- Stats at Basketball Reference

Ernest Brown (born May 17, 1979, in the Bronx, New York) is an American former professional basketball player who was selected in the second round of the 2000 NBA draft by the Miami Heat. He played collegiately for the Indian Hills Community College. He played three games for them during the 2001-02 NBA season before being waived, and was also later signed and waived by the Boston Celtics; he has spent most of his career in the NBDL and other minor/foreign leagues. His final NBA game was played on April 14, 2002, in a 67 - 94 loss to the New York Knicks. In that game, Brown recorded 3 points, 4 rebounds and 1 block.

In 2007, he played in Puerto Rico for Grises de Humacao. He played 3 games in 2008 as an import for the Barangay Ginebra Kings in the Philippine Basketball Association's Fiesta Conference before being replaced by ex-NBDL standout Chris Alexander. He played high school basketball at St. Rita of Cascia High School in Chicago and St. Raymond High School for Boys in the Bronx.
