= Mark Karcher =

American basketball player

Personal information
- Born: November 22, 1978 (age 47) Baltimore, Maryland
- Listed height: 6 ft 5 in (1.96 m)
- Listed weight: 215 lb (98 kg)

Career information
- High school: St. Frances Academy (Baltimore, Maryland)
- College: Temple (1998–2000)
- NBA draft: 2000: 2nd round, 48th overall pick
- Drafted by: Philadelphia 76ers
- Playing career: 2000–2007
- Position: Shooting guard / small forward
- Coaching career: 2007–2011, 2012–present

Career history

Playing
- 2000–2001: Richmond Rhythm
- 2001: JDA Dijon
- 2002–2003: Hyères-Toulon
- 2004–2005: ALM Évreux
- 2005: JA Vichy
- 2005–2006: Fayetteville Patriots
- 2006–2007: Maryland Nighthawks
- 2007: Petrochimi Iman Harbour
- 2007: Quilmes de Mar del Plata

Coaching
- 2007–2008: St. Frances Academy (assistant)
- 2008–2011: St. Frances Academy
- 2012–present: BDJ STEM Academy

Career highlights
- First-team All-Atlantic 10 (2000); All-Atlantic 10 Rookie Team (1999); McDonald's All-American (1997)
- Stats at Basketball Reference

Mark Duane Karcher (born November 22, 1978) is a retired American professional basketball player who was selected by the Philadelphia 76ers in the 2nd round (48th pick) in the 2000 NBA draft. Although his professional career spanned seven years, he never played in a regular season NBA game, making him 1 of 8 players from the 2000 NBA Draft to never play in the league.

== College career ==
Ineligible as a freshman in 1997–98, Karcher played two years of college basketball as a guard/forward with Temple University from 1998 to 2000 before leaving early to enter the 2000 NBA draft.

== Professional career ==
Karcher participated in training camp with the Philadelphia 76ers, but never played for them in a regular season game. He was selected with the 59th pick in the 2001 NBA D-League draft by the Greenville Groove, and would also play for the Richmond Rhythm of the International Basketball League that same year. In 2005, he participated in training camp with the Utah Jazz but was not signed to a contract. He spent the majority of his professional playing career overseas. Karcher played in France with Hyères-Toulon in the French top-tier league, the LNB Pro A, and with ALM Évreux Basket, in the French 2nd-tier league, the LNB Pro B. After five years in France, Karcher spent one year in Iran, followed by one year in Argentina, before ending his playing career in 2007.
