= Indian Hills Community College =

Public college in Ottumwa and Centerville, Iowa, US

Coordinates: 41°02′42″N 92°23′38″W

- Type: Public community college
- Established: 1966
- Endowment: $30 million (FY 2016)
- President: Dr. Matt Thompson
- Students: 3,900
- Undergraduates: 3,900
- Location: Campuses in Ottumwa and Centerville, Iowa, United States
- Campus: Rural
- Colors: Maroon and Gold
- Mascots: Warriors, Falcons (baseball)
- Website: www.indianhills.edu

Indian Hills Community College (IHCC) is a public community college in Iowa with campuses in Ottumwa and Centerville. IHCC serves both traditional residential students and commuter students, primarily from a ten-county area in southeast Iowa as well as portions of northern Missouri. This regional service area includes the cities of Ottumwa, Centerville, Oskaloosa, Fairfield, Albia, Bloomfield, and Chariton. IHCC is accredited by the Higher Learning Commission.

== History ==
Indian Hills Community College was formed by the consolidation of three previously existing post-secondary education institutions: Iowa Tech-Area XV Community College, Centerville Community College, and Ottumwa Heights College. The first steps toward merger took place on June 3, 1966, under the guidance of the Iowa Board of Public Instruction, with operations beginning on July 1, 1966. At first known as the Iowa Tech Area XV Community College, classes were held at the Ottumwa Regional Airport and consisted of technical programs formerly administrated by the Ottumwa public school district. Centerville Community College was added to the fold on July 1, 1968, with a new 72-acre campus completed in 1970. The merged institutions were renamed Indian Hills Community College in 1970.

== Campuses ==
=== Ottumwa ===
The main campus is located in Ottumwa, encompassing all of the former Ottumwa Heights facilities, plus several other buildings added since the consolidation. Included are residential halls, Advance Technology Center, and the Hellyer Student Center, where the IHCC Warriors basketball team play. The second Ottumwa campus, known as North Campus, is based on 270 acres at Ottumwa Regional Airport. This campus is the base for IHCC's aviation programs, commercial driver training, welding technology center and auto collision repair programs. The Job Corps training facility is also located at the IHCC North campus.

=== Centerville ===
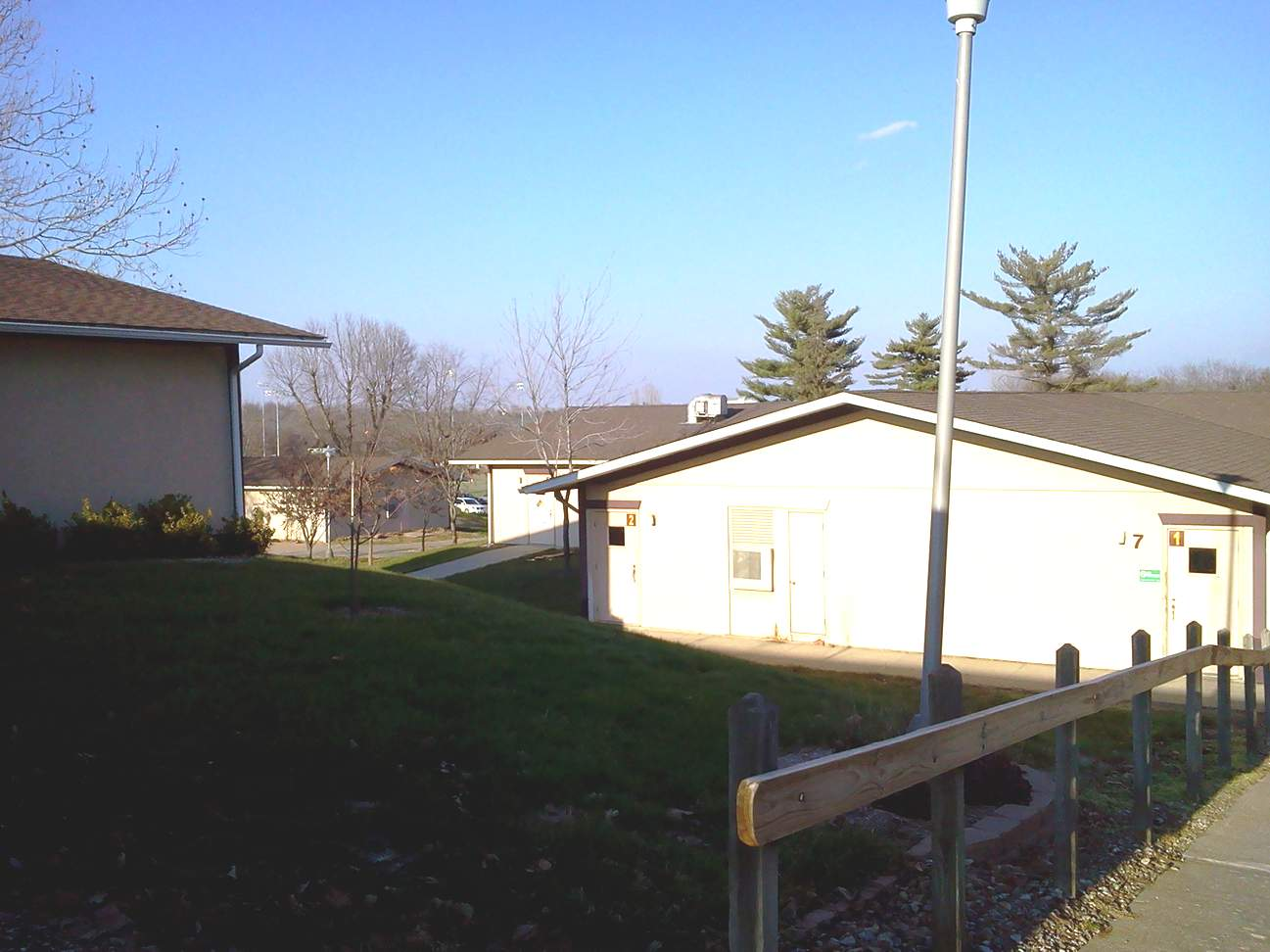
The modular design of the IHCC-Centerville campus.

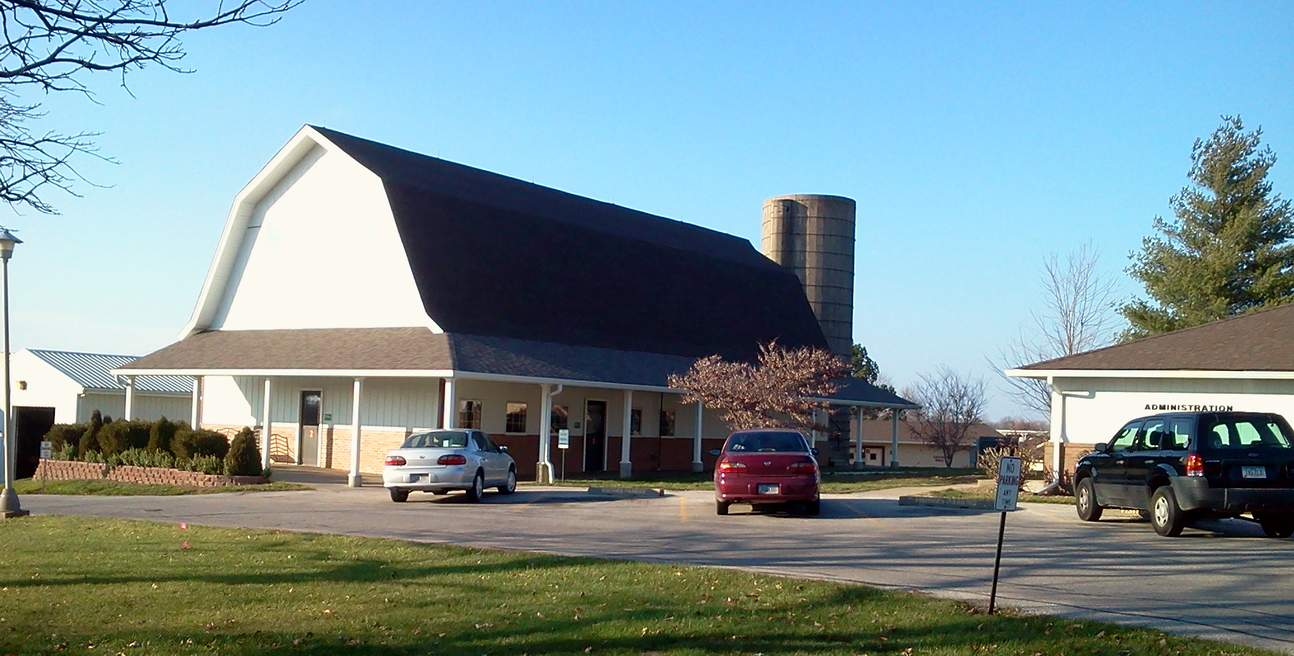
"The Barn" at IHCC-Centerville is a popular place to grab a snack or study between classes.

A third campus is located in Centerville, Iowa. Completed in 1970, the Centerville campus consists of a series of single-story modular buildings connected by walkways. It is located in a rural setting on the west edge of the community. A variety of specialized technology programs as well as general education classes are offered at IHCC -Centerville. The IHCC Falcons, the college's baseball team, practice and play their home games at Pat Daugherty Field on the Centerville campus. In May, 2013 school officials announced a major expansion to IHCC - Centerville's Sustainable agriculture program. Philanthropist and Appanoose County, Iowa native Morgan E. Cline donated $500,000 for the construction of a large greenhouse, learning center, classrooms, and distribution center for the produce grown. The new complex, to be built adjacent to the Centerville IHCC campus, will also offer community outreach events such as tours and continuing education classes in subjects ranging from back yard gardening to food packaging.

== Organization and administration ==
The college has experienced relatively low turnover in the school administration since its founding. Mel Everingham, who oversaw the merger of the disparate institutions into IHCC, remained on as the college's first president, serving until 1973. Lyle Hellyer became president in 1973 and over the next twenty-eight years the college experienced considerable growth in campus facilities, student enrollment, and program offerings. He retired in 2001 and the Hellyer Student Life center is named in his honor. In 2001, Jim Linenmayer was named the third president of IHCC. Linenmayer began his career at Indian Hills in 1980 as a college recruiter. During his time as president, student enrollment increased by 45 percent, the Job Corps center was opened, and new academic programs were introduced. In 2013, Lindenmayer retired and was succeeded by Marlene Sprouse. Sprouse is an IHCC alumnus and previously served as Dean of the IHCC - Centerville campus.

== Academics ==
Indian Hills Community College offers associate degrees, certificates, and diplomas. They also have transfer programs that help students get general education classes completed, to then be transferred to a four year college as a rising junior. This allows the student to pursue a bachelor's degree, because of the general education classes they completed at Indian Hills Community College.

== Athletics ==
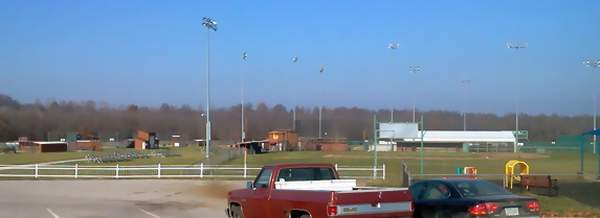
IHCC baseball complex in Centerville.

Indian Hills participates in the National Junior College Athletic Association in the following sports:

- Women: Cross Country, Golf, Soccer, Softball, Track & Field, Volleyball, Wrestling
- Men: Basketball, Baseball, Cross Country, Golf, Soccer, Track & Field, Wrestling
- Coed: Competitive Cheer & Dance, Sports Shooting

The men's basketball team is the only program to win three consecutive NJCAA Division I Men's Basketball National Championships - 1997, 1998, 1999. During that stretch, the Warriors broke UCLA's previous collegiate men's basketball record by winning 89 consecutive games. The Warriors are tied for eighth all-time with 17 appearances at the NJCAA DI Men's Basketball Championship and rank in the top-30 all-time in the NJCAA with over 1,200 wins. Three players have been drafted into the NBA directly from the college (C.J. Bruton, Cory Hightower, and Ernest Brown) while others have become professional basketball players following their collegiate careers, including Pete Mickeal. Indian Hills competes in the Hellyer Center.

The Warrior softball team began at the Centerville campus in the spring of 1974, but since 1988 has been based in Ottumwa. The program has made 20 appearances in the National Junior College Athletic Association softball tournament. Home games are played at R.L. Hellyer Field, next to their indoor practice facility, funded by and named for IHCC alumnus Tom Arnold.

The Indian Hills Baseball team, formerly the Falcons, competes on the Indian Hills Centerville campus at Pat Daugherty Field. The team's indoor multi-purpose facility features a pro-style clubhouse, four indoor batting cages with pitching machines, four indoor mounds, a complete weight room and laundry facilities. The facility added turf during this renovation. Since the program's inception in 1961, Indian Hills has totaled more than 120 alumni who signed or were drafted to play professional baseball. As of 2022, 10 alumni were either playing or coaching at the professional level.

The Warrior golf program, housed on the Ottumwa campus, has six national championships, all coming since 2000 (2000, 2011, 2012, 2014, 2015, 2018). Along with the team national titles, the Warriors have claimed five medalist honors at the national championship. The Warriors have competed in 35 consecutive national tournaments, dating back to the 1987 season.

In the spring of 2022, Indian Hills Community College announced the addition of women's golf that will begin competition at the NJCAA Division I level beginning in the fall of 2024.

The women's soccer program began in 2007 and competes at the NJCAA Division I level. The Warriors have claimed six All-American honors since 2017.

The Indian Hills men's soccer program began in 2007.

The Indian Hills Volleyball program began in the 1996 season on the Ottumwa campus and has been a perennial power in the Iowa Community College Athletic Conference. The Warriors have reached three NJCAA Division I National Tournaments, most recently in 2019. Since 1998, the program has claimed 18 individual All-American awards. The Warriors compete in the Hellyer Center.

Indian Hills offers men's and women's cross country and track and field that compete at the NJCAA Division I level. The Men's and Women's Cross Country programs were added to the intercollegiate sports offered at Indian Hills Community College in the fall of 2007.

The track and field programs have consistently placed at the NJCAA Indoor and Outdoor National Championships and have claimed five individual national champions, including 2020 Tokyo Olympics Silver Medalist Kenny Bednarek who won three national championships in 2019. On May 17, 2019, at the NJCAA Outdoor National Championships, Bednarek ran the fourth-fastest all-conditions 200-meter dash at the time.

The men's and women's wrestling programs, currently coached by Cole Spree, are two of the newest intercollegiate offerings at Indian Hills. Both programs began competition in the fall of 2020. In its first two years of existence, the women's programs won both the team and dual Junior College National Championships in back-to-back years in 2021 and 2022 with 25 individual All-Americans and seven individual national champions. The Warriors will begin competing at the NJCAA level beginning in the fall of 2022. The men's program currently competes at the NJCAA level and won the NJCAA North Central District Championship in its first year of competition in the spring of 2021. The Warriors have placed eighth in the 2021 and 2022 NJCAA National Championships and have claimed 10 All-Americans.

The coed Competitive Cheer and Dance program at Indian Hills offers scholarships to student-athletes to compete at the intercollegiate level. The program won the 2022 Small College Co-Ed Intermediate National Championship at the Cheer Ltd. Nationals at CANAM. The program also provides cheerleading at home athletic contests, including all home men's basketball games at the historic Hellyer Center.

The Indian Hills Sports Shooting squad competes in the Iowa Community College Athletic Conference. The program competes at the Appanoose County Shooting Club.

== Student life ==
IHCC offers on-campus student housing at the main Ottumwa campus and the Centerville campus. Both apartment-style and traditional double-occupancy dorm rooms are available. All are non-smoking. Internet, cable television, and telephone service are provided. All dormitories are air-conditioned and laundry facilities are available. A student health and wellness clinic staffed by a Registered Nurse practitioner is located in Trustee's Hall on the main Ottumwa campus.

Extracurricular activities available include over forty clubs and organizations. A variety of organized intramural sports are offered. Students interested in the performing arts can participate in school-sponsored theater productions, the Camerata Singers, the IHCC Jazz band or the Warrior Basketball band. Those with interest in the written word may participate in a variety of poetry readings through the academic year and submit their own work for publication in the Hills Review: The Journal of Student Poetry.

== Notable people ==
- Tom Arnold (born 1959), actor/comedian
- Kenny Bednarek, professional track and field sprinter
- Ernest Brown, former NBA guard for the Miami Heat
- C. J. Bruton, former NBA and NBL guard
- Dwight Buycks (born 1989), professional basketball player who plays for Oklahoma City Blue
- LaRon Dendy, professional basketball player who currently plays for BC Ferro-ZNTU
- Irving Falú, professional baseball player for the Cincinnati Reds organization
- Ali Farokhmanesh, retired professional basketball player
- Tony Galbreath, former NFL running back/wide receiver for the New Orleans Saints, New York Giants and Minnesota Vikings
- Rubén Gotay, former professional baseball player
- Dwight Hardy, professional basketball player who currently plays for Trabzonspor
- Cory Hightower, former NBA guard
- Dustin Hogue (born 1992), basketball player
- Riley "Brock" Kjeldgaard, first baseman who currently plays for the Lancaster Barnstormers
- Duane Kuiper, MLB second baseman for the Cleveland Indians and San Francisco Giants; older brother of Glen (shown directly below)
- Glen Kuiper, MLB broadcaster for the Oakland Athletics; younger brother of Duane (shown directly above)
- Jonathan Mathews, former coach for the San Diego Padres; son of Rick (shown directly below)
- Rick Mathews, former bullpen coach for the Colorado Rockies; father of Jonathan (shown directly above)
- Pete Mickeal, former ABA league MVP and International basketball player
- Nuni Omot (born 1994), basketball player in the Israeli Basketball Premier League
- Eric Rasmussen, former professional baseball player
- Shane Rawley, former professional baseball player
- Marcus Relphorde (born 1988), basketball player in the Israeli National League
- Kevin Ritz, former Major League Baseball pitcher for the Detroit Tigers
- Orlando Román, professional baseball player who plays for the Tokyo Yakult Swallows
- Johnny Taylor, NBA and international basketball player
- Rick Upchurch, former NFL wide receiver for the Denver Broncos
- Ramón Vázquez, retired Major League Baseball infielder
- Jeff Zimmerman, former professional baseball player
