= Dan Langhi =

American basketball player (born 1977)

Personal information
- Born: November 28, 1977 (age 48) Chicago, Illinois, U.S.
- Listed height: 6 ft 11 in (2.11 m)
- Listed weight: 220 lb (100 kg)

Career information
- High school: Marshall County (Benton, Kentucky)
- College: Vanderbilt (1996–2000)
- NBA draft: 2000: 2nd round, 31st overall pick
- Drafted by: Dallas Mavericks
- Playing career: 2000–2010
- Position: Small forward
- Number: 14, 7, 3

Career history
- 2000–2002: Houston Rockets
- 2002–2003: Phoenix Suns
- 2003: Golden State Warriors
- 2003–2004: Milwaukee Bucks
- 2004: Idaho Stampede

Career highlights
- SEC Player of the Year – Coaches (2000)
- Stats at NBA.com
- Stats at Basketball Reference

Daniel Matthew Langhi (born November 28, 1977) is an American former professional basketball player. Born in Chicago, Illinois, he was raised in the small western Kentucky town of Benton. In addition to his high school basketball career, where he finish as the runner-up for Kentucky's prestigious "Mr. Basketball" award, Langhi won regional titles as a member of Marshall County's soccer teams. After growing six inches during his sophomore year of high school, he joined his older brother Bob Langhi in playing college basketball, signing to play at Vanderbilt, and was drafted 31st overall by the Dallas Mavericks in the second round of the 2000 NBA draft. Langhi played for the Houston Rockets, the Phoenix Suns, the Golden State Warriors and the Milwaukee Bucks in the NBA.

While at Vanderbilt, Langhi was a three-year starter for the Commodores at small forward, creating mismatches with his 6'11" frame. After finishing his junior year as the second leading scorer in the Southeastern Conference at 17.7 points per game, Langhi paced the league his senior year with a 22.1 point average, and averaged 6.0 rebounds. He became the first Vanderbilt player to lead the SEC in scoring since 1965. Langhi was voted SEC player of the year along with LSU's Stromile Swift, becoming the first Commodore since Billy McCaffrey in 1993 to be named the league's top player. During the 1999–2000 season, Langhi scored 20 plus points in 19 of 29 games, and was also named the league's First Team, the second year in a row that he made an All-SEC team.

Langhi finished his college career with 1,502 points, which currently ranks 10th all-time at Vanderbilt. Langhi ranks seventh all-time in 3-point field goals made at Vanderbilt with 138. He capped his senior season by being selected to compete for the National 3-Point Shooting Title, and was one of 22 finalists for the Wooden Award.

Langhi played in the NBA from 2000 to 2004, playing 133 games and averaging 3 points and 1.5 rebounds. Langhi's final NBA game was played on December 17, 2003, in a 83–93 loss to the Los Angeles Clippers where he recorded 2 points and 1 rebound. After the NBA, Langhi played in the CBA, Italy, Japan, Germany, and Puerto Rico. In 2010, he signed with Libertad de Sunchales in the Argentine Liga Nacional de Básquet.

== NBA career statistics ==
Legend
GP	Games played	GS	Games started	MPG	Minutes per game
FG%	Field goal percentage	3P%	3-point field goal percentage	FT%	Free throw percentage
RPG	Rebounds per game	APG	Assists per game	SPG	Steals per game
BPG	Blocks per game	PPG	Points per game	**Bold**	Career high

=== Regular season ===
Year	Team	GP	GS	MPG	FG%	3P%	FT%	RPG	APG	SPG	BPG	PPG
2000–01	Houston	33	0	7.3	.374	.000	.552	1.2	0.1	0.2	0.0	2.7
2001–02	Houston	34	**8**	**12.8**	.392	.250	.727	**2.0**	**0.4**	0.2	**0.1**	3.1
2002–03	Phoenix	**60**	0	9.0	**.401**	.290	.600	1.5	**0.4**	**0.3**	**0.1**	3.1
2003–04	Golden State	4	0	4.3	.333	.000	**1.000**	0.8	0.0	0.0	0.0	1.5
2003–04	Milwaukee	2	0	10.0	.375	**.500**	.000	0.5	0.0	0.0	0.0	**3.5**
Career		133	8	9.4	.391	.289	.613	1.5	0.3	0.2	0.1	3.0
