= List of 2004–05 NBA season transactions =

This is a detailed list of transactions during the 2004-05 NBA season.

== Retirement ==
| Date | Name | Team(s) played (years) | Age | Notes | Ref. |
|---|---|---|---|---|---|
| September 22 | Todd MacCulloch | Philadelphia 76ers (1999–2001, 2002–2003); New Jersey Nets (2001–2002) | 28 | Retired due to a genetic disorder in his hands and feet. | |
| September 30 | Rick Fox | Boston Celtics (1991–1997); Los Angeles Lakers (1997–2004) | 35 | | |
| October 5 | Scottie Pippen | Chicago Bulls (1987–1998, 2003–2004); Houston Rockets (1998–1999); Portland Trail Blazers (1999–2003) | 39 | Made a comeback in 2008 overseas | |
| October 6 | Bimbo Coles | Miami Heat (1990–1996, 2003–2004); Golden State Warriors (1996–1999); Atlanta Hawks (1999–2000); Cleveland Cavaliers (2000–2003); Boston Celtics (2003) | 36 | | |
| October 23 | Evan Eschmeyer | New Jersey Nets (1999–2001); Dallas Mavericks (2001–2003) | 29 | Retired due to knee problems | |
| October 28 | Avery Johnson | Seattle SuperSonics (1988–1990); Denver Nuggets (1990, 2001–2002); San Antonio Spurs (1991, 1992–1993, 1994–2001); Houston Rockets (1992); Golden State Warriors (1993–1994, 2003–2004); Dallas Mavericks (2002–2003) | 39 | Signed as an assistant coach for Dallas. | |
| February 13 | Karl Malone | Utah Jazz (1985–2003); Los Angeles Lakers (2003–2004) | 41 | | |

== Front office movements ==
- Cleveland Cavaliers names Danny Ferry general manager (June 27, 2005)
- Orlando Magic names Dave Twardzik and Otis Smith assistant general managers and Alex Martins executive vice president of marketing and franchise relations (June 27, 2005)
- Cleveland Cavaliers dismisses president and general manager of basketball operations Jim Paxson (April 1, 2005).

== Front office contract extensions ==
- New Jersey Nets sign general manager Ed Stefanski to a contract extension (May 12, 2005).

== Head coach changes ==
- Terry Stotts is hired as head coach of the Milwaukee Bucks (July 8, 2005) after Terry Porter was dismissed on June 22.
- Dwane Casey is hired as head coach of the Minnesota Timberwolves (June 17, 2005)
- Phil Jackson returns to coach the Los Angeles Lakers (June 14, 2005)
- Mike Brown is named assistant coach of the Cleveland Cavaliers (June 2, 2005)
- Brian Hill is named head coach of the Orlando Magic (May 24, 2005)
- Philadelphia 76ers announce the replacement of Maurice Cheeks for Jim O'Brien as head coach (May 23, 2005)
- Avery Johnson was named head coach of the Dallas Mavericks on March 19, 2005.
- Johnny Davis is dismissed as head coach of the Orlando Magic (March 17, 2005)

== Head coach contract extensions ==
- Chicago Bulls extend Scott Skiles's contract through the 2008-09 NBA season (June 16, 2005)
- Houston Rockets head coach Jeff Van Gundy gets a contract extension through the 2007-08 NBA season (May 18, 2005)

== Assistant coach changes ==
- Phoenix Suns names Dan D'Antoni assistant coach (June 29, 2005)
- Orlando Magic names Randy Ayers and Tom Sterner assistant coaches (June 10, 2005)
- Cleveland Cavaliers names Hank Egan assistant coach (June 9, 2005)
- New Jersey Nets (now called Brooklyn Nets) names Gordon Chiesa assistant coach (June 9, 2005)
- Milwaukee Bucks names Mike Sanders assistant coach (June 7, 2005).
- Assistant coach Jim Boylen resigns to become an assistant coach at Michigan State (May 31, 2005)
- Cleveland Cavaliers names Mike Bratz and Wes Wilcox assistant coaches (March 24, 2005)

== Player movement ==
=== Trades ===
June
| June 22 | To Charlotte Bobcats: 2004 1st round pick (Emeka Okafor) | To Los Angeles Clippers: 2004 1st round pick (Shaun Livingston); 2004 2nd round pick (Lionel Chalmers) |
| June 22 | To Phoenix Suns | To Charlotte Bobcats: 2005 1st round pick (Sean May) |
| June 23 | To Charlotte Bobcats: 2004 2nd round pick (Bernard Robinson) | To Milwaukee Bucks: Zaza Pachulia |
| June 23 | To Charlotte Bobcats: 2007 1st round pick (Jared Dudley) | To Cleveland Cavaliers: Saša Pavlović |
| June 24 (Draft-day trades) | To San Antonio Spurs: Draft rights to Viktor Sanikidze | To Atlanta Hawks: 2005 2nd round pick (Cenk Akyol); Cash |
| June 24 (Draft-day trades) | To Utah Jazz: 2005 1st round pick (Linas Kleiza) | To Dallas Mavericks: Draft rights to Pavel Podkolzin |
| June 24 (Draft-day trades) | To Orlando Magic: Draft rights to Jameer Nelson | To Denver Nuggets: 2005 1st round pick Julius Hodge |
| June 24 (Draft-day trades) | To Phoenix Suns: Draft rights to Jackson Vroman; 2005 1st round pick (Nate Robinson) | To Chicago Bulls: Draft rights to Luol Deng |
| June 24 (Draft-day trades) | To Houston Rockets: Draft rights to Vassilis Spanoulis | To Dallas Mavericks: Draft rights to Luis Flores |
| June 24 (Draft-day trades) | To Washington Wizards: Antawn Jamison | To Dallas Mavericks: Christian Laettner; Jerry Stackhouse; Draft rights to Devin Harris |
| June 24 (Draft-day trades) | To Portland Trail Blazers: Draft rights to Viktor Khryapa | To New Jersey Nets: Eddie Gill |
| June 24 (Draft-day trades) | To Seattle SuperSonics: 2005 2nd round pick (Mickaël Gelabale) | To Memphis Grizzlies: Draft rights to Andre Emmett |
| June 24 (Draft-day trades) | To Toronto Raptors: Draft rights to Pape Sow; 2005 2nd round pick (Uroš Slokar) | To Miami Heat: Draft rights to Albert Miralles |
| June 29 | To Orlando Magic: Kelvin Cato; Steve Francis; Cuttino Mobley | To Houston Rockets: Tracy McGrady; Tyronn Lue; Juwan Howard; Reece Gaines |
July
| July 14 | To Miami Heat: Shaquille O'Neal | To Los Angeles Lakers: Caron Butler; Brian Grant; Lamar Odom; 2006 1st round pick (Jordan Farmar); 2007 2nd round pick (Renaldas Seibutis) |
| July 14 | To Los Angeles Clippers: 2005 2nd round pick (Daniel Ewing); 2006 2nd round pick (Paul Davis) | To Charlotte Bobcats: Melvin Ely; Eddie House |
| July 15 | To Indiana Pacers: Stephen Jackson | To Atlanta Hawks: Al Harrington |
| July 15 | To New Jersey Nets: 2005 1st round pick (Joey Graham); Two 2006 1st round picks (Renaldo Balkman and Marcus Williams) | To Denver Nuggets: Kenyon Martin |
| July 23 | To Cleveland Cavaliers: Drew Gooden; Steven Hunter; Anderson Varejão | To Orlando Magic: Tony Battie; 2005 2nd round pick (Martynas Andriuškevičius); 2007 2nd round pick (Brad Newley) |
| July 26 | To Seattle SuperSonics: Danny Fortson | To Dallas Mavericks: Calvin Booth |
| July 29 | To New Jersey Nets: 2005 2nd round pick (Chris Taft) | To Los Angeles Clippers: Kerry Kittles |
August
| August 4 | To Detroit Pistons: Derrick Coleman; Amal McCaskill | To Philadelphia 76ers: Corliss Williamson |
| August 4 | To Atlanta Hawks: Tony Delk; Antoine Walker | To Dallas Mavericks: Jason Terry; Alan Henderson; Cash (was going to receive 2007 1st round pick, but it was lottery protected) |
| August 5 | To Chicago Bulls: Othella Harrington; Dikembe Mutombo; Cezary Trybański; Frank Williams | To New York Knicks: Jamal Crawford; Jerome Williams |
| August 6 | To Boston Celtics: Rick Fox; Gary Payton; 2006 1st round pick (Rajon Rondo) | To Los Angeles Lakers: Chucky Atkins; Jumaine Jones; Chris Mihm |
| August 16 | To Charlotte Bobcats: 2005 2nd round pick (Ronny Turiaf) | To Atlanta Hawks: Predrag Drobnjak |
| August 24 | To Golden State Warriors: Christian Laettner; Luis Flores; Eduardo Nájera; Mladen Šekularac; 2007 1st round pick (Petteri Koponen); Future 1st round pick; Cash; Trade exception | To Dallas Mavericks: Erick Dampier; Dan Dickau; Evan Eschmeyer; Steve Logan |
September
| September 8 | To Chicago Bulls: Adrian Griffin; Eric Piatkowski; Mike Wilks | To Houston Rockets: Dikembe Mutombo |
November
| November 1 | To Orlando Magic: Brandon Hunter | To Charlotte Bobcats: Keith Bogans |
December
| December 3 | To New Orleans Hornets: Dan Dickau; 2005 2nd round pick (Marcin Gortat) | To Dallas Mavericks: Darrell Armstrong |
| December 6 | To Los Angeles Lakers: 2005 2nd round pick (Ronny Turiaf); 2009 2nd round pick (Patrick Beverley) | To Charlotte Bobcats: Kareem Rush |
| December 17 | To Toronto Raptors: Alonzo Mourning; Aaron Williams; Eric Williams; 2005 1st round pick (Joey Graham); 2006 1st round pick (Renaldo Balkman) | To New Jersey Nets: Vince Carter |
| December 23 | To Houston Rockets: Jon Barry | To Atlanta Hawks: Tyronn Lue |
| December 27 | To New Orleans Hornets: Boštjan Nachbar; Jim Jackson | To Houston Rockets: David Wesley |
January
| January 3 | To Phoenix Suns: 2007 2nd round pick (Aaron Gray); 2009 2nd round pick (DeJuan Blair) | To Golden State Warriors: Žarko Čabarkapa |
| January 10 | To Orlando Magic: Doug Christie | To Sacramento Kings: Michael Bradley; Cuttino Mobley |
| January 21 | To Detroit Pistons: Carlos Arroyo | To Utah Jazz: Elden Campbell; 2006 1st round pick (Joel Freeland) |
| January 21 | To Phoenix Suns: Jim Jackson; 2005 2nd round pick (Marcin Gortat) | To New Orleans Hornets: Casey Jacobsen; Maciej Lampe; Jackson Vroman |
February
| February 8 | To Phoenix Suns: Walter McCarty | To Boston Celtics: 2007 2nd round pick (Aaron Gray) |
| February 14 | To Golden State Warriors: 2005 2nd round pick (Chris Taft); 2007 2nd round pick (Stéphane Lasme) | To New Jersey Nets: Clifford Robinson |
| February 23 | To Sacramento Kings: Brian Skinner; Kenny Thomas; Corliss Williamson | To Philadelphia 76ers: Chris Webber; Matt Barnes; Michael Bradley |
| February 24 | To Philadelphia 76ers: Jamal Mashburn; Rodney Rogers | To New Orleans Hornets: Glenn Robinson |
| February 24 | To Miami Heat: Steve Smith | To Charlotte Bobcats: Malik Allen |
| February 24 | To New York Knicks: Maurice Taylor; 2005 2nd round pick (Marcin Gortat) | To Houston Rockets: Vin Baker; Moochie Norris; 2006 2nd round pick (Steve Novak) |
| February 24 | To Dallas Mavericks: Keith Van Horn | To Milwaukee Bucks: Calvin Booth; Alan Henderson |
| February 24 | To Golden State Warriors: Baron Davis | To New Orleans Hornets: Speedy Claxton; Dale Davis |
| February 24 | To Milwaukee Bucks: Reece Gaines; 2006 2nd round pick (David Noel); 2007 2nd round pick (Ramon Sessions) | To Houston Rockets: Zendon Hamilton; Mike James |
| February 24 | To New York Knicks: Malik Rose; 2005 1st round pick (David Lee); 2006 1st round pick (Mardy Collins) | To San Antonio Spurs: Jamison Brewer; Nazr Mohammed |
| February 24 | To Golden State Warriors: Nikoloz Tskitishvili; Rodney White | To Denver Nuggets: Eduardo Nájera; Luis Flores; 2007 1st round pick (Petteri Koponen) |
| February 24 | To Atlanta Hawks: Tom Gugliotta; Gary Payton; Michael Stewart; 2006 1st round pick (Rajon Rondo) | To Boston Celtics: Antoine Walker |
| February 24 | To Boston Celtics: 2007 1st round pick (Rudy Fernández) | To Cleveland Cavaliers: Jiří Welsch |

=== Releases ===
| Player | Date waived | Former team | Ref |
|---|---|---|---|
| Alex Garcia | June 12 | San Antonio Spurs | |
| Matt Carroll | June 29 | San Antonio Spurs | |
| Eddie Gill | July 6 | New Jersey Nets | |
| Omar Cook | July 6 | Portland Trail Blazers | |
| Travis Hansen | August 2 | Atlanta Hawks | |
| Steven Hunter | August 10 | Cleveland Cavaliers | |
| Paul Shirley | August 20 | Chicago Bulls | |
| Popeye Jones | September 3 | Golden State Warriors | |
| Greg Buckner | September 8 | Philadelphia 76ers | |
| Christian Laettner | September 9 | Golden State Warriors | |
| Lucious Harris | September 15 | New Jersey Nets | |
| Danny Ferry | September 30 | Indiana Pacers | |
| Joseph Forte | October 1 | Seattle SuperSonics | |
| Amal McCaskill | October 1 | Detroit Pistons | |
| Chris Jefferies | October 3 | Chicago Bulls | |
| Earl Barron | October 14 | Orlando Magic | |
| Bruno Šundov | October 15 | Cleveland Cavaliers | |
| Rod Strickland | October 19 | Orlando Magic | |
| Mike Wilks | October 20 | Chicago Bulls | |
| Andre Brown | October 20 | New Jersey Nets | |
| Omar Cook | October 25 | Charlotte Bobcats | |
| Alex Scales | October 25 | New Jersey Nets | |
| Andre Barrett | October 25 | New York Knicks | |
| Mitchell Butler | October 27 | Denver Nuggets | |
| Lonny Baxter | October 28 | Atlanta Hawks | |
| Kaniel Dickens | October 28 | Los Angeles Clippers | |
| Tremaine Fowlkes | October 28 | New Orleans Hornets | |
| Donnell Harvey | October 28 | Atlanta Hawks | |
| Jelani McCoy | October 28 | Milwaukee Bucks | |
| Anthony Goldwire | October 28 | Minnesota Timberwolves | |
| Kasib Powell | October 28 | Minnesota Timberwolves | |
| Terence Morris | October 28 | Los Angeles Clippers | |
| Brandon Armstrong | October 28 | Golden State Warriors | |
| Cezary Trybański | October 28 | Chicago Bulls | |
| Derrick Zimmerman | October 28 | Houston Rockets | |
| Howard Eisley | October 29 | Phoenix Suns | |
| Billy Thomas | October 30 | Washington Wizards | |
| Gerald Fitch | October 30 | Washington Wizards | |
| Britton Johnsen | October 31 | New Orleans Hornets | |
| Bo Outlaw | November 1 | Memphis Grizzlies | |
| John Thomas | November 1 | Minnesota Timberwolves | |
| Troy Bell | November 1 | Memphis Grizzlies | |
| Eddie Robinson | November 1 | Chicago Bulls | |
| Scottie Pippen | November 4 | Chicago Bulls | |
| Shandon Anderson | November 9 | New York Knicks | |
| Matt Freije | November 14 | Miami Heat | |
| Anthony Goldwire | November 29 | Milwaukee Bucks | |
| Eddie House | December 4 | Charlotte Bobcats | |
| Britton Johnsen | December 7 | Indiana Pacers | |
| Awvee Storey | December 9 | New Jersey Nets | |
| Tremaine Fowlkes | December 13 | Indiana Pacers | |
| Jelani McCoy | December 14 | Atlanta Hawks | |
| Geno Carlisle | December 16 | Portland Trail Blazers | |
| Marcus Haislip | December 24 | Indiana Pacers | |
| Lonny Baxter | December 27 | New Orleans Hornets | |
| Alex Garcia | December 27 | New Orleans Hornets | |
| Jérôme Moïso | January 3 | New Jersey Nets | |
| Corsley Edwards | January 3 | New Orleans Hornets | |
| Kirk Penney | January 3 | Los Angeles Clippers | |
| Ansu Sesay | January 3 | Golden State Warriors | |
| Smush Parker | January 4 | Detroit Pistons | |
| Kaniel Dickens | January 5 | New Jersey Nets | |
| Derrick Coleman | January 5 | Detroit Pistons | |
| Kendall Gill | January 5 | Milwaukee Bucks | |
| Brandin Knight | January 19 | Houston Rockets | |
| Junior Harrington | January 21 | New Orleans Hornets | |
| Qyntel Woods | January 21 | Portland Trail Blazers | |
| Matt Freije | January 21 | New Orleans Hornets | |
| Anthony Goldwire | January 25 | Detroit Pistons | |
| Elden Campbell | January 26 | Utah Jazz | |
| Jerome Beasley | January 26 | Miami Heat | |
| James Thomas | January 31 | Portland Trail Blazers | |
| Smush Parker | February 8 | Phoenix Suns | |
| Jamal Sampson | February 8 | Charlotte Bobcats | |
| Alonzo Mourning | February 11 | Toronto Raptors | |
| Donnell Harvey | February 14 | New Jersey Nets | |
| Kenny Anderson | February 24 | Atlanta Hawks | |
| Zendon Hamilton | February 24 | Houston Rockets | |
| Chris Crawford | February 24 | Atlanta Hawks | |
| Jamison Brewer | February 26 | New York Knicks | |
| Glenn Robinson | March 1 | New Orleans Hornets | |
| Dale Davis | March 1 | New Orleans Hornets | |
| Wesley Person | March 1 | Miami Heat | |
| Gary Payton | March 1 | Atlanta Hawks | |
| Samaki Walker | March 18 | Washington Wizards | |
| Andre Barrett | March 19 | Houston Rockets | |
| Kenny Anderson | March 25 | Los Angeles Clippers | |
| Dion Glover | April 4 | San Antonio Spurs | |
| Jerome Williams | May 15 | New York Knicks | |

=== Free Agency ===
| Player | Date signed | New team | Former team | Ref |
|---|---|---|---|---|
| Rafer Alston | July 14 | Toronto Raptors | Miami Heat | |
| Carlos Arroyo | July 14 | Utah Jazz | | |
| Shane Battier | July 14 | Memphis Grizzlies | | |
| Mark Blount | July 14 | Boston Celtics | | |
| Bruce Bowen | July 14 | San Antonio Spurs | | |
| Brian Cardinal | July 14 | Memphis Grizzlies | Golden State Warriors | |
| Jason Collier | July 14 | Atlanta Hawks | | |
| Marquis Daniels | July 14 | Dallas Mavericks | | |
| Carlos Delfino | July 14 | Detroit Pistons | Fortitudo Pallacanestro Bologna | |
| Adonal Foyle | July 14 | Golden State Warriors | | |
| Manu Ginóbili | July 14 | San Antonio Spurs | | |
| Jason Hart | July 14 | Charlotte Bobcats | San Antonio Spurs | |
| Steve Nash | July 14 | Phoenix Suns | Dallas Mavericks | |
| Brian Skinner | July 14 | Philadelphia 76ers | Milwaukee Bucks | |
| Tamar Slay | July 14 | Charlotte Bobcats | New Jersey Nets | |
| Hedo Türkoğlu | July 14 | Orlando Magic | San Antonio Spurs | |
| Brent Barry | July 15 | San Antonio Spurs | Seattle SuperSonics | |
| Kobe Bryant | July 15 | Los Angeles Lakers | | |
| Michael Doleac | July 15 | Miami Heat | Denver Nuggets | |
| Richie Frahm | July 15 | Portland Trail Blazers | Seattle SuperSonics | |
| Derek Fisher | July 15 | Golden State Warriors | Los Angeles Lakers | |
| Anthony Johnson | July 16 | Indiana Pacers | | |
| Marcus Camby | July 16 | Denver Nuggets | | |
| Antonio McDyess | July 16 | Detroit Pistons | Phoenix Suns | |
| Chris Andersen | July 19 | New Orleans Hornets | Denver Nuggets | |
| Gordan Giriček | July 19 | Utah Jazz | Orlando Magic | |
| Quinton Ross | July 19 | Los Angeles Clippers | Telindus Oostende | |
| Vlade Divac | July 20 | Los Angeles Lakers | Sacramento Kings | |
| Greg Ostertag | July 20 | Sacramento Kings | Utah Jazz | |
| Ronald Dupree | July 21 | Detroit Pistons | Chicago Bulls | |
| Keyon Dooling | July 22 | Miami Heat | Los Angeles Clippers | |
| Jarron Collins | July 23 | Utah Jazz | | |
| Fred Hoiberg | July 23 | Minnesota Timberwolves | Chicago Bulls | |
| Darius Songaila | July 23 | Sacramento Kings | | |
| Rasheed Wallace | July 23 | Detroit Pistons | | |
| Etan Thomas RFA | July 25 | Washington Wizards (matched offer sheet from Milwaukee) | | |
| Mehmet Okur RFA | July 27 | Utah Jazz | Detroit Pistons (refused to match offer sheet) | |
| Nenad Krstić | July 27 | New Jersey Nets | Partizan | |
| Eddie Gill | July 28 | Indiana Pacers | Portland Trail Blazers | |
| Rasual Butler | July 28 | Miami Heat | | |
| Michael Bradley | July 29 | Orlando Magic | Atlanta Hawks | |
| Rodney Buford | July 29 | New Jersey Nets | Sacramento Kings | |
| Corey Benjamin | July 29 | Chicago Bulls | Xinjiang Flying Tigers | |
| Anthony Peeler | July 29 | Washington Wizards | Sacramento Kings | |
| Quentin Richardson RFA | July 29 | Phoenix Suns | Los Angeles Clippers (refused to match offer sheet) | |
| Jacque Vaughn | July 29 | New Jersey Nets | Atlanta Hawks | |
| Carlos Boozer RFA | July 30 | Utah Jazz | Cleveland Cavaliers (refused to match offer sheet) | |
| Morris Peterson RFA | July 30 | Toronto Raptors (matched offer sheet from New Orleans) | | |
| Stacey Augmon | August 2 | Orlando Magic | New Orleans Hornets | |
| Michael Ruffin | August 2 | Washington Wizards | Utah Jazz | |
| Omar Cook | August 3 | Charlotte Bobcats | Portland Trail Blazers | |
| Rodney Rogers | August 3 | New Orleans Hornets | New Jersey Nets | |
| Tony Massenburg | August 4 | San Antonio Spurs | Sacramento Kings | |
| Samaki Walker | August 4 | Washington Wizards | Miami Heat | |
| Horace Jenkins | August 4 | Detroit Pistons | AEK Athens | |
| Trenton Hassell RFA | August 4 | Minnesota Timberwolves (matched offer sheet from Portland) | | |
| Zendon Hamilton | August 5 | Milwaukee Bucks | Philadelphia 76ers | |
| Mike James | August 5 | Milwaukee Bucks | Detroit Pistons | |
| Robert Traylor | August 5 | Cleveland Cavaliers | New Orleans Hornets | |
| Damon Jones | August 6 | Miami Heat | Milwaukee Bucks | |
| Eric Williams | August 6 | New Jersey Nets | Cleveland Cavaliers | |
| Bob Sura | August 9 | Houston Rockets | Atlanta Hawks | |
| Charlie Ward | August 9 | Houston Rockets | San Antonio Spurs | |
| Wesley Person | August 11 | Miami Heat | Atlanta Hawks | |
| Andrés Nocioni | August 11 | Chicago Bulls | Tau Cerámica | |
| Ron Mercer | August 12 | New Jersey Nets | San Antonio Spurs | |
| Željko Rebrača | August 12 | Los Angeles Clippers | Atlanta Hawks | |
| Tom Gugliotta | August 16 | Boston Celtics | Utah Jazz | |
| Mamadou N'Diaye | August 16 | Los Angeles Clippers | Atlanta Hawks | |
| Quinton Ross | August 16 | Los Angeles Clippers | Telindus Oostende | |
| Loren Woods | August 18 | Toronto Raptors | Miami Heat | |
| Steven Hunter | August 20 | Phoenix Suns | Orlando Magic | |
| Mikki Moore | August 20 | Los Angeles Clippers | Utah Jazz | |
| Mo Williams RFA | August 21 | Milwaukee Bucks | Utah Jazz (refused to match offer sheet) | |
| Linton Johnson | August 25 | San Antonio Spurs | Chicago Bulls | |
| Joel Przybilla | August 25 | Portland Trail Blazers | Atlanta Hawks | |
| Jamison Brewer | August 27 | New York Knicks | Indiana Pacers | |
| Brevin Knight | August 31 | Charlotte Bobcats | Milwaukee Bucks | |
| Yuta Tabuse | September 7 | Phoenix Suns | Long Beach Jam | |
| Jake Tsakalidis RFA | September 10 | Memphis Grizzlies (matched offer sheet from Cleveland) | | |
| D. J. Mbenga | September 14 | Dallas Mavericks | Spirou Charleroi | |
| Christian Laettner | September 15 | Miami Heat | Golden State Warriors | |
| Kenny Anderson | September 16 | Atlanta Hawks | Indiana Pacers | |
| Jon Barry | September 16 | Atlanta Hawks | Denver Nuggets | |
| Steve Smith | September 16 | Charlotte Bobcats | New Orleans Hornets | |
| Josh Davis | September 20 | Philadelphia 76ers | Baloncesto León | |
| Kevin Willis | September 22 | Atlanta Hawks | San Antonio Spurs | |
| Ibo Kutluay | September 22 | Seattle SuperSonics | Ülkerspor | |
| Jelani McCoy | September 23 | Milwaukee Bucks | Cleveland Cavaliers | |
| Scott Williams | September 28 | Cleveland Cavaliers | Dallas Mavericks | |
| Tremaine Fowlkes | September 29 | New Orleans Hornets | Detroit Pistons | |
| Britton Johnsen | September 29 | New Orleans Hornets | Orlando Magic | |
| Junior Harrington | September 30 | New Orleans Hornets | Azovmash Mariupol | |
| Ryan Bowen | September 30 | Houston Rockets | Denver Nuggets | |
| Keith McLeod | September 30 | Utah Jazz | Pallacanestro Virtus Roma | |
| Lee Nailon | September 30 | New Orleans Hornets | Cleveland Cavaliers | |
| Terence Morris | September 30 | Los Angeles Clippers | Columbus Riverdragons | |
| Avery Johnson | September 30 | Dallas Mavericks | Golden State Warriors | |
| Laron Profit | October 1 | Washington Wizards | Guangdong Southern Tigers | |
| Maurice Evans | October 1 | Sacramento Kings | Benetton Treviso | |
| Smush Parker | October 1 | Detroit Pistons | Aris B.C. | |
| Matt Barnes | October 1 | Sacramento Kings | Los Angeles Clippers | |
| Lucious Harris | October 1 | Cleveland Cavaliers | New Jersey Nets | |
| Derrick Dial | October 1 | Phoenix Suns | Orlando Magic | |
| Gary Trent | October 1 | Chicago Bulls | Minnesota Timberwolves | |
| Billy Thomas | October 1 | Washington Wizards | Pallacanestro Trieste | |
| Aleksandar Radojević | October 4 | Utah Jazz | P.A.O.K. B.C. | |
| John Thomas | October 4 | Minnesota Timberwolves | CB Sant Josep | |
| Eddie Griffin | October 4 | Minnesota Timberwolves | Houston Rockets | |
| Lonny Baxter | October 4 | Atlanta Hawks | Washington Wizards | |
| Travis Best | October 4 | New Jersey Nets | Dallas Mavericks | |
| Tierre Brown | October 4 | Los Angeles Lakers | New Orleans Hornets | |
| Greg Buckner | October 4 | Denver Nuggets | Philadelphia 76ers | |
| Anthony Carter | October 4 | Minnesota Timberwolves | San Antonio Spurs | |
| Kaniel Dickens | October 4 | Los Angeles Clippers | Portland Trail Blazers | |
| Ansu Sesay | October 4 | Golden State Warriors | Seattle SuperSonics | |
| Jabari Smith | October 4 | New Jersey Nets | Sacramento Kings | |
| Anthony Goldwire | October 4 | Minnesota Timberwolves | Yakima Sun Kings | |
| Brandon Armstrong | October 4 | Golden State Warriors | New Jersey Nets | |
| Corsley Edwards | October 4 | Orlando Magic | Sioux Falls Skyforce | |
| Alex Scales | October 4 | New Jersey Nets | Huntsville Flight | |
| Derrick Zimmerman | October 4 | Houston Rockets | Columbus Riverdragons | |
| Earl Barron | October 4 | Orlando Magic | Tuborg Pilsener | |
| Awvee Storey | October 4 | New Jersey Nets | Trotamundos de Carabobo | |
| Anthony Miller | October 5 | Atlanta Hawks | Philadelphia 76ers | |
| Bryon Russell | October 6 | Denver Nuggets | Los Angeles Lakers | |
| DerMarr Johnson | October 18 | Denver Nuggets | New York Knicks | |
| Donnell Harvey | October 22 | Atlanta Hawks | Phoenix Suns | |
| Mike Wilks | October 27 | San Antonio Spurs | Houston Rockets | |
| Andre Barrett | October 29 | Houston Rockets | New York Knicks | |
| Howard Eisley | November 3 | Utah Jazz | Phoenix Suns | |
| Anthony Goldwire | November 3 | Milwaukee Bucks | Minnesota Timberwolves | |
| Marcus Fizer | November 4 | Milwaukee Bucks | Chicago Bulls | |
| Mateen Cleaves | November 5 | Seattle SuperSonics | Cleveland Cavaliers | |
| Jelani McCoy | November 8 | Atlanta Hawks | Milwaukee Bucks | |
| Bo Outlaw | November 8 | Phoenix Suns | Memphis Grizzlies | |
| Geno Carlisle | November 14 | Portland Trail Blazers | Al Kuwait BC | |
| Shandon Anderson | November 14 | Miami Heat | New York Knicks | |
| Matt Freije | November 19 | New Orleans Hornets | Miami Heat | |
| Tremaine Fowlkes | November 25 | Indiana Pacers | New Orleans Hornets | |
| Britton Johnsen | November 25 | Indiana Pacers | New Orleans Hornets | |
| Marcus Haislip | December 1 | Indiana Pacers | Milwaukee Bucks | |
| Corsley Edwards | December 4 | New Orleans Hornets | Orlando Magic | |
| Kendall Gill | December 6 | Milwaukee Bucks | Chicago Bulls | |
| Kaniel Dickens | December 8 | New Jersey Nets | Los Angeles Clippers | |
| Lonny Baxter | December 12 | New Orleans Hornets | Atlanta Hawks | |
| Michael Curry | December 13 | Indiana Pacers | Toronto Raptors | |
| Eddie House | December 18 | Milwaukee Bucks | New Orleans Hornets | |
| Tremaine Fowlkes | December 18 | Indiana Pacers | Los Angeles Clippers | |
| Kirk Penney | December 26 | Los Angeles Clippers | Asheville Altitude | |
| Jérôme Moïso | December 28 | New Jersey Nets | Toronto Raptors | |
| Anthony Goldwire | January 5 | Detroit Pistons (10-day contract) | Milwaukee Bucks | |
| Darrick Martin | January 5 | Los Angeles Clippers (10-day contract) | Minnesota Timberwolves | |
| Jérôme Moïso | January 5 | New Jersey Nets (10-day contract) | | |
| Corsley Edwards | January 5 | New Orleans Hornets | | |
| Eddie House | January 7 | Sacramento Kings | Milwaukee Bucks | |
| Obinna Ekezie | January 10 | Atlanta Hawks (10-day contract) | Columbus Riverdragons | |
| Kaniel Dickens | January 10 | New Jersey Nets (10-day contract) | Idaho Stampede | |
| Anthony Goldwire | January 15 | Detroit Pistons (2nd 10-day contract) | | |
| Jérôme Moïso | January 15 | New Jersey Nets (2nd 10-day contract) | | |
| Brandin Knight | January 15 | Houston Rockets (10-day contract) | Asheville Altitude | |
| Smush Parker | January 19 | Phoenix Suns (10-day contract) | Florida Flame | |
| Rod Strickland | January 19 | Houston Rockets (10-day contract) | Toronto Raptors | |
| Obinna Ekezie | January 20 | Atlanta Hawks (2nd 10-day contract) | | |
| Billy Thomas | January 20 | New Jersey Nets (10-day contract) | Dakota Wizards | |
| Anthony Goldwire | January 23 | Phoenix Suns | UNICS Kazan | |
| Qyntel Woods | January 26 | Miami Heat | Portland Trail Blazers | |
| Elden Campbell | January 28 | New Jersey Nets | Utah Jazz | |
| Junior Harrington | January 29 | New Orleans Hornets (10-day contract) | | |
| Smush Parker | January 29 | Phoenix Suns (2nd 10-day contract) | | |
| Billy Thomas | January 30 | New Jersey Nets (2nd 10-day contract) | | |
| Donnell Harvey | February 1 | New Jersey Nets (10-day contract) | Sioux Falls Skyforce | |
| Jérôme Moïso | February 1 | Cleveland Cavaliers | New Jersey Nets | |
| Donnell Harvey | February 11 | New Jersey Nets (2nd 10-day contract) | | |
| James Thomas | February 22 | Cleveland Cavaliers (10-day contract) | Portland Trail Blazers | |
| Maurice Baker | February 22 | Los Angeles Clippers | Dakota Wizards | |
| Matt Carroll | February 23 | Charlotte Bobcats | Roanoke Dazzle | |
| Jackie Butler | February 27 | New York Knicks | Great Lakes Storm | |
| Cory Alexander | February 28 | Charlotte Bobcats | Roanoke Dazzle | |
| Jermaine Jackson | February 28 | New York Knicks (10-day contract) | Great Lakes Storm | |
| Kenny Anderson | February 28 | Los Angeles Clippers | Atlanta Hawks | |
| Alonzo Mourning | March 1 | Miami Heat | New Jersey Nets | |
| Alan Henderson | March 1 | Dallas Mavericks | Atlanta Hawks | |
| Randy Livingston | March 2 | Utah Jazz (10-day contract) | Sioux Falls Skyforce | |
| Wesley Person | March 3 | Denver Nuggets | Miami Heat | |
| Elden Campbell | March 4 | Detroit Pistons | New Jersey Nets | |
| Dale Davis | March 4 | Indiana Pacers | Golden State Warriors | |
| Gary Payton | March 4 | Boston Celtics | Atlanta Hawks | |
| Anthony Goldwire | March 7 | Milwaukee Bucks | Detroit Pistons | |
| Maurice Baker | March 12 | Portland Trail Blazers (10-day contract) | Los Angeles Clippers | |
| Damone Brown | March 17 | Washington Wizards (10-day contract) | Huntsville Flight | |
| Dion Glover | March 17 | San Antonio Spurs (10-day contract) | Toronto Raptors | |
| Torraye Braggs | March 19 | Houston Rockets | Washington Wizards | |
| Damone Brown | March 27 | Washington Wizards (2nd 10-day contract) | | |
| Dion Glover | March 27 | San Antonio Spurs (2nd 10-day contract) | | |
| Ben Handlogten | March 29 | Utah Jazz (10-day contract) | Phoenix Suns | |
| Andre Barrett | March 31 | Orlando Magic (10-day contract) | Houston Rockets | |
| Damone Brown | April 2 | Washington Wizards (10-day contract) | Huntsville Flight | |
| Mark Jones | April 2 | Orlando Magic (2nd 10-day contract) | | |
| Glenn Robinson | April 4 | San Antonio Spurs | Philadelphia 76ers | |
| Omar Cook | April 9 | Toronto Raptors (10-day contract) | Fayetteville Patriots | |
| James Thomas | April 9 | Atlanta Hawks | Portland Trail Blazers | |
| Andre Barrett | April 10 | Orlando Magic (Rest of season) | | |
| Lawrence Funderburke | April 18 | Chicago Bulls | Sacramento Kings | |

== Draft ==
=== First round ===
| Pick | Player | Date signed | Team | School/club team | Ref |
|---|---|---|---|---|---|
| 1 | Dwight Howard | July 7 | Orlando Magic | Southwest Atlanta Christian Academy (Atlanta, GA) | |
| 2 | Emeka Okafor | July 21 | Orlando Magic | Connecticut (Jr.) | |
| 3 | Ben Gordon | July 16 | Chicago Bulls | Connecticut (Jr.) | |
| 4 | Shaun Livingston | September 1 | Los Angeles Clippers | Peoria (Peoria, IL) | |
| 5 | Devin Harris | July 1 | Dallas Mavericks | Wisconsin (Jr.) | |
| 6 | Josh Childress | July 12 | Atlanta Hawks | Stanford (Jr.) | |
| 7 | Luol Deng | July 16 | Chicago Bulls | Duke (Fr.) | |
| 8 | Rafael Araújo | July 1 | Toronto Raptors | BYU (Sr.) | |
| 9 | Andre Iguodala | July 2 | Philadelphia 76ers | Arizona (So.) | |
| 10 | Luke Jackson | July 1 | Cleveland Cavaliers | Oregon (Sr.) | |
| 11 | Andris Biedriņš | July 8 | Golden State Warriors | BK Skonto (Latvia) | |
| 12 | Robert Swift | July 14 | Seattle SuperSonics | Bakersfield (Bakersfield, CA) | |
| 13 | Sebastian Telfair | July 10 | Portland Trail Blazers | Lincoln HS (Brooklyn, NY) | |
| 14 | Kris Humphries | July 12 | Utah Jazz | Minnesota (Fr.) | |
| 15 | Al Jefferson | July 2 | Boston Celtics | Prentiss HS (Prentiss, MS) | |
| 16 | Kirk Snyder | July 12 | Utah Jazz | Nevada (Jr.) | |
| 17 | Josh Smith | July 11 | Atlanta Hawks | Oak Hill Academy (Mouth of Wilson, VA) | |
| 18 | J. R. Smith | July 6 | New Orleans Hornets | St. Benedict Prep (Newark, NJ) | |
| 19 | Dorell Wright | July 26 | Miami Heat | South Kent HS (South Kent, CT) | |
| 20 | Jameer Nelson | July 7 | Orlando Magic | Saint Joseph's (Sr.) | |
| 21 | Pavel Podkolzin | July 27 | Dallas Mavericks | Pallacanestro Varese (Italy) | |
| 22 | Viktor Khryapa | July 15 | Portland Trail Blazers | PBC CSKA Moscow (Russia) | |
| 23 | Sergei Monia | | Portland Trail Blazers | PBC CSKA Moscow (Russia) | |
| 24 | Delonte West | July 2 | Boston Celtics | Saint Joseph's (Jr.) | |
| 25 | Tony Allen | July 2 | Boston Celtics | Oklahoma State (Sr.) | |
| 26 | Kevin Martin | July 7 | Sacramento Kings | Western Carolina (Jr.) | |
| 27 | Saša Vujačić | July 20 | Los Angeles Lakers | Pallalcesto Amatori Udine (Italy) | |
| 28 | Beno Udrih | July 14 | San Antonio Spurs | Breil Milano (Italy) | |
| 29 | David Harrison | July 7 | Indiana Pacers | Colorado (Jr.) | |

=== Second round ===
| Pick | Player | Date signed | Team | School/club team | Ref |
|---|---|---|---|---|---|
| 30 | Anderson Varejão | August 18 | Cleveland Cavaliers | FC Barcelona Bàsquet (Spain) | |
| 31 | Jackson Vroman | July 9 | Phoenix Suns | Iowa State (Sr.) | |
| 32 | Peter John Ramos | July 21 | Washington Wizards | Caguas (Puerto Rico) | |
| 33 | Lionel Chalmers | August 16 | Los Angeles Clippers | Xavier (Sr.) | |
| 34 | Donta Smith | October 3 | Atlanta Hawks | Southeastern Illinois (So.) | |
| 35 | Andre Emmett | July 7 | Memphis Grizzlies | Texas Tech (Sr.) | |
| 36 | Antonio Burks | July 7 | Memphis Grizzlies | Memphis (Sr.) | |
| 37 | Royal Ivey | July 14 | Atlanta Hawks | Texas (Sr.) | |
| 38 | Chris Duhon | October 4 | Chicago Bulls | Duke (Sr.) | |
| 39 | Albert Miralles | | Miami Heat | Roseto Basket (Italy) | |
| 40 | Justin Reed | August 27 | Boston Celtics | Ole Miss (Sr.) | |
| 41 | David Young | September 1 | Seattle SuperSonics | North Carolina Central (Sr.) | |
| 42 | Viktor Sanikidze | | San Antonio Spurs | JDA Dijon (France) | |
| 43 | Trevor Ariza | August 3 | New York Knicks | UCLA (Fr.) | |
| 44 | Tim Pickett | August 3 | New Orleans Hornets | Florida State (Sr.) | |
| 45 | Bernard Robinson | July 28 | Charlotte Bobcats | Michigan (Sr.) | |
| 46 | Ha Seung-Jin | December 26 | Portland Trail Blazers | Yonsei University (South Korea) | |
| 47 | Pape Sow | October 4 | Toronto Raptors | Cal State Fullerton (Sr.) | |
| 48 | Ricky Minard | July 7 | Sacramento Kings | Morehead State (Sr.) | |
| 49 | Sergei Lishouk | | Memphis Grizzlies | Khimik Yuzhny (Ukraine) | |
| 50 | Vassilis Spanoulis | | Houston Rockets | Maroussi B.C. (Greece) | |
| 51 | Christian Drejer | July 28 | New Jersey Nets | Michigan (Sr.) | |
| 52 | Romain Sato | July 15 | San Antonio Spurs | Xavier (Sr.) | |
| 53 | Matt Freije | August 26 | Miami Heat | Vanderbilt (Sr.) | |
| 54 | Rickey Paulding | | Detroit Pistons | Missouri (Sr.) | |
| 55 | Luis Flores | September 14 | Golden State Warriors | Manhattan (Sr.) | |
| 56 | Marcus Douthit | | Los Angeles Lakers | Providence (Sr.) | |
| 57 | Sergei Karaulov | | San Antonio Spurs | Skha Jakutia Yakutsk | |
| 58 | Blake Stepp | October 4 | Minnesota Timberwolves | Gonzaga (Sr.) | |
| 59 | Rashad Wright | September 14 | Indiana Pacers | Georgia (Sr.) | |

=== Signed Undrafted Players ===
| Date | Player | Team | School/Club Team |
|---|---|---|---|
| July 26 | Kyle Davis | New Jersey Nets | Auburn (Sr.) |
| August 6 | Tony Bobbitt | Los Angeles Lakers | Cincinnati (Sr.) |
| September 14 | John Edwards | Indiana Pacers | Kent State (Sr.) |
| September 30 | Jared Reiner | Chicago Bulls | Iowa (Sr.) |
| October 1 | Erik Daniels | Sacramento Kings | Kentucky (Sr.) |
| October 1 | Gerald Fitch | Washington Wizards | Kentucky (Sr.) |
| October 4 | Andre Barrett | Houston Rockets | Seton Hall (Sr.) |
| October 4 | Andre Brown | New Jersey Nets | DePaul (Sr.) |
| November 3 | Damien Wilkins | Seattle SuperSonics | Georgia (Sr.) |
| January 9 | James Thomas | Portland Trail Blazers (10-day contract) | Texas (Sr.) |
| March 23 | Mark Jones | Orlando Magic (10-day contract) | UCF (Sr.) |
