= 2003 CBA All-Star Game =

American Conference	National Conference
125	140
- Date: January 13-14, 2003
- Venue: Sioux Falls Arena, Sioux Falls
- MVP: Versile Shaw
- Attendance: 7,500

The 2003 Continental Basketball Association All-Star Game was the 37th All-Star Game organised by CBA since its inception in 1949 and the first after 2000. It was held at the 7,500 seat Sioux Falls Arena in Sioux Falls, South Dakota on January 13-14, 2003 in front of a sell-out crowd. The National Conference defeated the American Conference 140-125.

Versile Shaw was named the MVP.

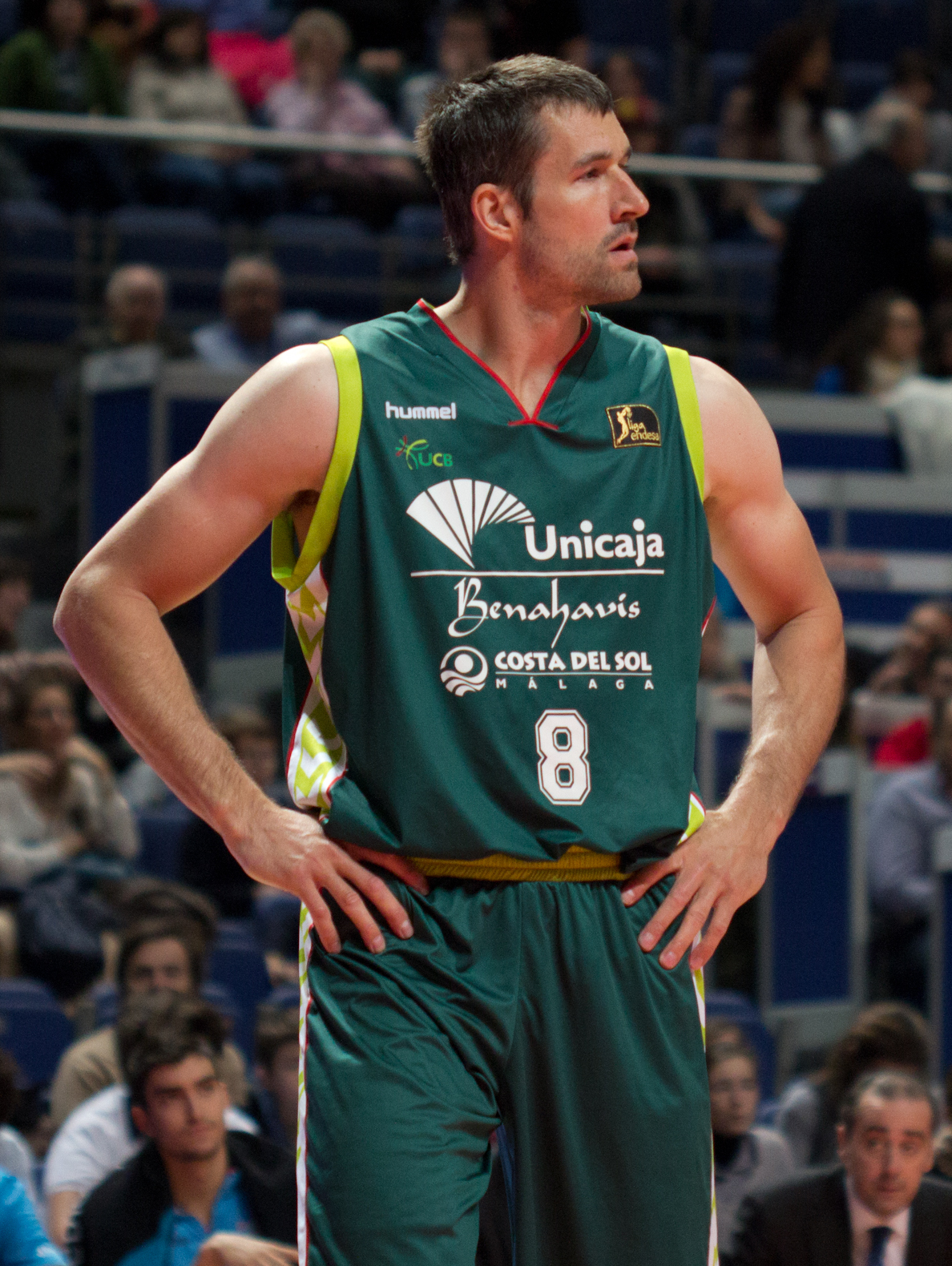
Andy Panko was selected for the National Conference

== The 2003 CBA All-Star Game events ==
=== CBA Long Distance Shootout ===
Malik Dixon of Dakota Wizards was the winner beating Puerto Rican Larry Ayuso of Grand Rapids Hoops in the final.

=== CBA Fan-Jam ===
Bryant Notree of the Gary Steelheads won the slam-dunk competition beating Cory Hightower of the Great Lakes Storm in the final.

=== The Game ===
MVP Versile Shaw scored 29 points, picking up 7 rebounds, Fred Vinson had 24 pts while Tyson Wheeler had 14 assist for the National Conference. Albert White scored 28, Cory Hightower 27, Bryant Notree had 21 points and 9 rebounds, Corsley Edwards 12 pts and Fred Vinson 24 points for the winners.

== All-Star teams ==
=== Rosters ===
National Conference
Pos.	Player	Team	Appearance
Team
G	(United States) Versile Shaw	Sioux Falls Skyforce	
G	(United States) Fred Vinson	Yakima Sun Kings	
G	(United States) Malik Dixon	Dakota Wizards	
F	(United States) Rosell Ellis	Great Lakes Storm	
C	(United States) Brian Green		
F	(United States) Courtney James	Dakota Wizards	
F	(United States) Andy Panko	Dakota Wizards	
F	(United States) Paul Shirley	Yakima Sun Kings	
G	(United States) Miles Simon	Dakota Wizards	
F	(United States) Tyson Wheeler	Yakima Sun Kings	
Head coach: (United States) Dave Joerger (Dakota Wizards)

American Conference
Pos.	Player	Team	Appearance
Team
F	(United States) Albert White	Rockford Lightning	
F	(United States) Cory Hightower	Great Lakes Storm	
F	(United States) Bryant Notree	Gary Steelheads	
C	(United States) Corsley Edwards	Sioux Falls Skyforce	
G	(Puerto Rico) Larry Ayuso	Grand Rapids Hoops	
G	(United States) Ronnie Fields	Rockford Lightning	
F	(United States) James Head		
F	(United States) Jerald Honeycutt	Grand Rapids Hoops	
C	(United States) Oliver Miller	Gary Steelheads	
G	(United States) Eric Murdock	Grand Rapids Hoops	
C	(United States) Livan Pyfrom	Rockford Lightning	
Head coach: (United States) Chris Daleo (Rockford Lightning)

=== Result ===
Team 1	Score	Team 2
National Conference	140 - 125	American Conference

== Awards ==
MVP	Topscorer	Slam-dunk champion	Long Distance Shootout Winner
(United States) Versile Shaw	(United States) Versile Shaw	(United States) Bryant Notree	(United States) Malik Dixon

== Former NBA players ==
- Fred Vinson
- Andy Panko
- Paul Shirley
- Miles Simon
- Tyson Wheeler
- Jerald Honeycutt
- Oliver Miller
- Eric Murdock

== See also ==
- 2001 CBA All-Star Game
- Continental Basketball Association
