= Podkolzin =

Podkolzin (Russian: Подкользин) is a Russian surname. Notable people with the surname include:

- Pavel Podkolzin (born 1985), Russian basketball player
- Vasily Podkolzin (born 2001), Russian ice hockey player
