= Cincinnati Stuff =

Defunct professional basketball team

- League: IBL
- Founded: 1999
- Folded: 2001
- History: Cincinnati Stuff (1999–2001)
- Arena: Firstar Center
- Capacity: 17,000
- Location: Cincinnati, Ohio
- Team colors: maroon, yellow
- President: Doug Kirchhofer
- Ownership: Neil Kirchhofer
- Championships: 0
- Division titles: 1 (2000)
- Website: www.iblhoops.com/teams/stuff (archived on March 11, 2000)

The Cincinnati Stuff were a professional basketball team in the International Basketball League (IBL) from 1999 to 2001.

== History ==
The Cincinnati Stuff were founded in March 1999, with Doug Kirchhofer as president and former NBA MVP Oscar Robertson as an advisor and part owner together with Neil Kirchhofer. The Stuff held the 1st pick of the 1999 IBL draft, which they used to select Devin Davis. However, Davis never played for the franchise, and the final roster for the first season was announced in late November 1999: the first players were Roderick Blakney, Lenny Brown, Allen Edwards, Damon Flint, Damon Frierson, Phil Hickey, Courtney James, Chris Kingsbury, Soumaila Samake, Alex Sanders, Eric Taylor and Wayne Turner. The head coach was Joby Wright, with Greg Herenda and Scott Spinelli as assistant coaches. In their first season, the Cincinnati Stuff finished with a record of 43–21 and won the East Division, qualifying for the playoffs, where they lost 2–0 in the conference semifinals against the Richmond Rhythm. In 32 regular season games, the team had an average attendance of 3,615 (the league average was 3,072).

In June 2000 Joby Wright announced that he would not return to coach the Stuff for the 2000–01 season. In the 2000 NBA draft Soumaila Samake, who averaged 9.7 points, 7.6 rebounds and 2.7 blocks per game, was selected by the New Jersey Nets with the 36th pick: he is the only player drafted from the IBL to the NBA. On July 1, 2000 the franchise announced Mike Frink (former assistant coach of the Brazil national basketball team during the 1992 and 1996 Olympics) as the new head coach. In their second season the Stuff signed Billy Thomas, who they had drafted in 1999, and finished the season with a 27–24 record (.529). The franchise ceased operations after the IBL folded in 2001.

== Season-by-season records ==
| Years | Head coach | GP | W | L | Pct. | GB | Finish | Playoffs |
|---|---|---|---|---|---|---|---|---|
| 1999–00 | Joby Wright | 64 | 43 | 21 | .672 | – | 1st IBL East | Lost IBL Eastern Conference Semifinal 2–0 Vs Richmond Rhythm |
| 2000–01 | Mike Frink | 51 | 27 | 24 | .529 | | | |

== All-time roster ==
- Roderick Blakney
- Lenny Brown
- Joe Courtney
- Allen Edwards
- Damon Flint
- Tremaine Fowlkes
- Damon Frierson
- Ronnie Grandison
- Derrick Hayes
- Phil Hickey
- Courtney James
- Nate Johnson
- Jamie Kendrick
- Chris Kingsbury
- Melvin Levett
- Martin Lewis
- Todd Lindeman
- Jeff Potter
- George Reese
- Soumaila Samake
- Alex Sanders
- Nick Sheppard
- Eric Taylor
- Marcus Taylor
- Billy Thomas
- Wayne Turner
- Jaquay Walls
- Fred Williams

== Awards ==
- All-IBL First team: Tremaine Fowlkes (2000), Roderick Blakney (2001)
- All-IBL Second team: Alex Sanders (2000)
