= 2001 CBA All-Star Game =

National Conference	American Conference
-	-
- Network: BET

The 2001 Continental Basketball Association All-Star Game was the scheduled 37th All-Star Game organised by CBA. It would be held between the American Conference and the National Conference in January 2001, with the All-Star team being selected already. However, the league due to financial issues was officially folded on February 9, 2001, and the All-Star Game was cancelled.

Before the 2000–01 season started, the CBA signed a television contract with BET to broadcast up to 18 games, including the 2001 CBA All-Star Game.

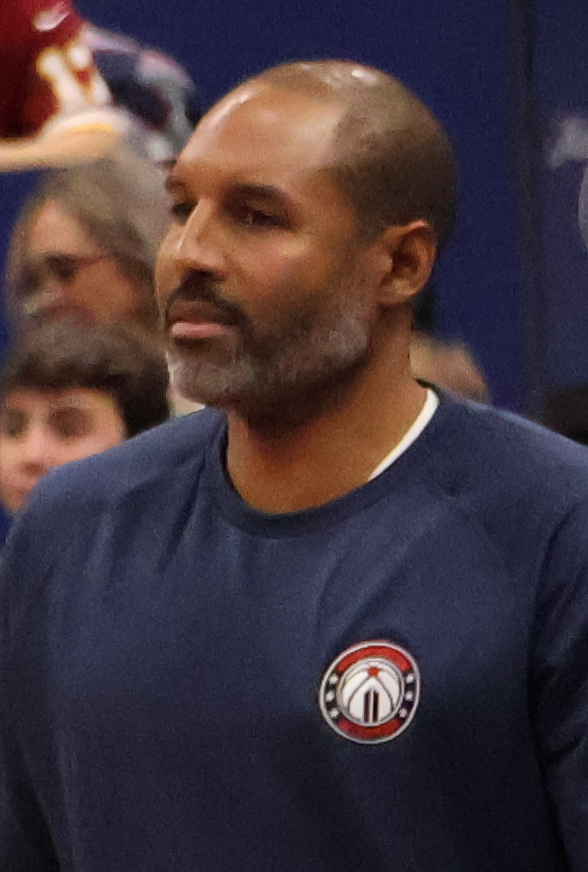
David Vanterpool came first in voting (here with the Washington Wizards in 2024)

== All-Star teams ==
The player with the highest number of votes for the National Conference was David Vanterpool with 21. Sean Colson received 20 votes and topped the list for the American Conference.

=== Rosters ===
National Conference
Pos.	Player	Team	Votes	Previous appearances
Starters
G	(United States) Chris Garner	Quad City Thunder	17	
G	(United States) David Vanterpool	Yakima Sun Kings	21	
G	(United States) Isaac Fontaine	La Crosse Bobcats	19	
F	(United States) Jamel Thomas	Quad City Thunder	20	
C	(Puerto Rico) Sharif Fajardo	Idaho Stampede	20	
Reserves
F	(United States) Rosell Ellis	Yakima SunKings	16	
G	(United States) Bryant Smith	Sioux Falls Skyforce	13	
F	(United States) Jamal Robinson	Sioux Falls Skyforce	12	
G	(United States) Darren McLinton	Idaho Stampede	16	
G	(United States) Randy Livingston	Idaho Stampede	16	
Head coach: (United States) Rory White (Yakima SunKings)

American Conference
Pos.	Player	Team	Votes	Previous appearances
Starters
G	(United States) Sean Colson	Grand Rapids Hoops	20	
F	(United States) Courtney James	Gary Steelheads	16	
F	(United States) Antonio Lang	Fort Wayne Fury	19	
F	(United States) Donny Marshall	Connecticut Pride	16	2000
C	(United States) Kirk King	Connecticut Pride	16	
Reserves
G	(United States) Artie Griffin	Fort Wayne Fury	14	
F	(United States) BJ McKie	Connecticut Pride	13	
G	(United States) Tony Smith	Rockford Lightning	13	
G	(United States) Brandon Williams	Rockford Lightning	13	2000
G	(United States) Ira Bowman	Connecticut Pride	12	2000
Head coach: (United States) Tyler Jones (Connecticut Pride)

== See also ==
- 2000 CBA All-Star Game
- Continental Basketball Association
