= 2000 CBA All-Star Game =

2000 CBA organised All-Star Game

Eastern Division	Western Division
135	124
- Date: January 18, 2000
- Venue: Sioux Falls Arena, Sioux Falls
- MVP: Dontae' Jones

The 2000 Continental Basketball Association All-Star Game was the 36th All-Star Game organised by CBA since its inception in 1949. It was held at the Sioux Falls Arena in Sioux Falls, South Dakota on January 18, 2000. The Eastern Division defeated the Western Division 135–124.

On December 22, 1999, CBA announced Sioux Falls, South Dakota as the city to host of the 2000 All-Star Game.

Dontae' Jones was named the MVP.

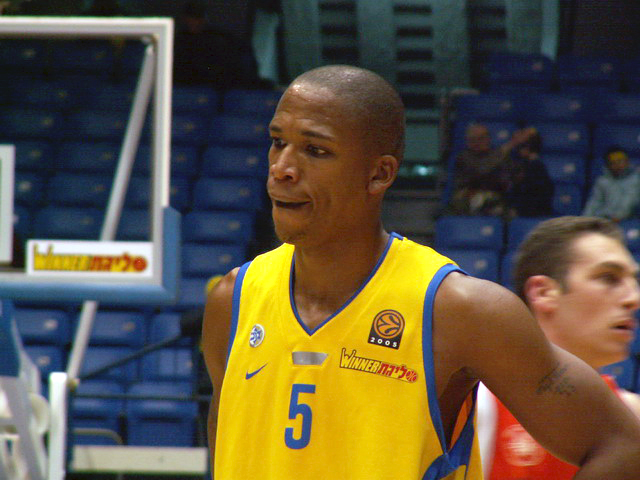
Maceo Baston played for the Eastern Conference (here with Maccabi Tel Aviv in 2006)

== The 2000 CBA All-Star Game events ==
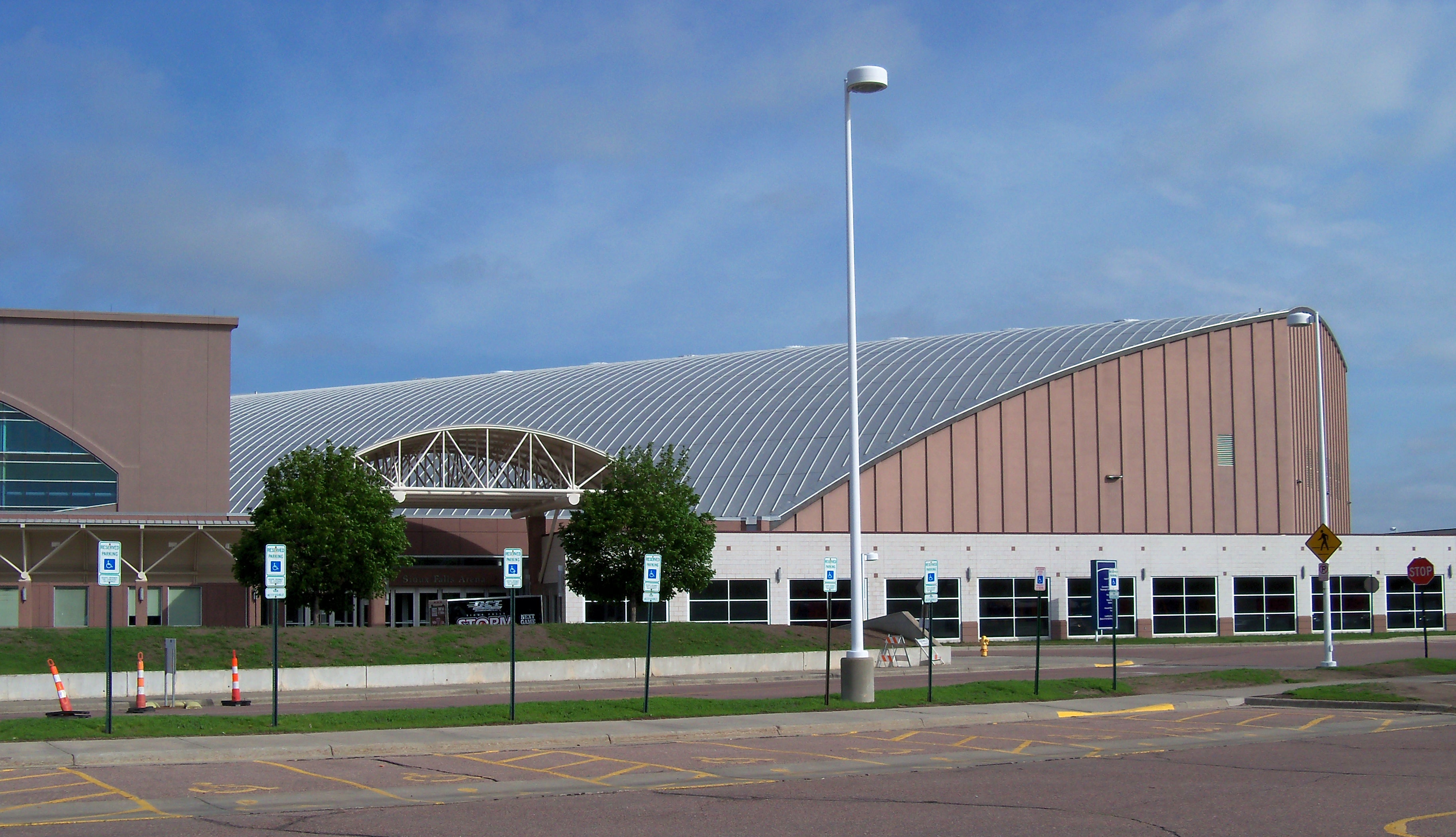
The Sioux Falls Arena

=== The Game ===
Dontae' Jones was the top scorer of the match with 34 pts for the Eastern Conference, while teammates Maceo Baston had 19 and Nick Davis scored 13 and Victor Page 14. On the other side, for the Western All Stars, Art Long scored 23 points, Torraye Braggs 21 and Etdrick Bohannon 17.

== All-Star teams ==
=== Rosters ===
Western Conference
Pos.	Number	Player	Team	Points	Previous appearances
Team
F	#41	(United States) Etdrick Bohannon	Fort Wayne Fury	17 pts	
G	#1	(United States) Earl Boykins	Rockford Lightning	8 pts	
F	#51	(United States) Torraye Braggs	Rockford Lightning	21 pts	
G	#22	(United States) Marlon Garnett	Grand Rapids Hoops	10 pts	
F	#33	(United States) Art Long	Yakima SunKings	23 pts	
C	#54	(United States) Bobby Martin	Quad City Thunder	7 pts	
F	#4	(United States) Jeff McInnis	Quad City Thunder	7 pts	
F	#8	(United States) Silas Mills	Yakima SunKings	16 pts	
G	#11	(United States) Brandon Williams	La Crosse Bobcats	15 pts	
G	#	(United States) Mark Davis (1973)	La Crosse Bobcats		
Head coach: (United States) Paul Woolpert (Yakima Sun Kings), Ass. Bob Thornton (Yakima Sun Kings)

Eastern Conference
Pos.	Number	Player	Team	Points	Previous appearances
Team
F	#55	(United States) Maceo Baston	Quad City Thunder	19 pts	
G	#12	(United States) Ira Bowman	Connecticut Pride	0 pts	
F	#30	(United States) Nick Davis	Sioux Falls Skyforce	13 pts	
F	#32	(United States) Dontae' Jones	La Crosse Bobcats	34 pts	
C	#40	(United States) Donny Marshall	Connecticut Pride	14 pts	
C	#52	(United States) Michael McDonald	Grand Rapids Hoops	4 pts	
G	#10	(United States) Moochie Norris	Fort Wayne Fury	7 pts	
G	#25	(United States) Damian Owens	Connecticut Pride	14 pts	
G	#5	(United States) Charles Smith (1975)	Rockford Lightning	16 pts	
G	#44	(United States) Victor Page	Sioux Falls Skyforce	14 pts	
Head coach: (United States) Mauro Panaggio (Quad City Thunder), Ass. Jim Sleeper (Quad City Thunder)

=== Result ===
Team 1	Score	Team 2
Eastern Conference	135 - 124	Western Conference

== Awards ==
MVP	Topscorer	Slam-dunk champion	Long Distance Shootout Winner
(United States) Dontae' Jones	(United States) Dontae' Jones		

== See also ==
- 2001 CBA All-Star Game
- Continental Basketball Association

== Sources ==
- HISTORY OF THE CBA ALL STAR GAME
