= Eric Murdock =

American basketball player (born 1968)

Personal information
- Born: June 14, 1968 (age 58) Somerville, New Jersey, U.S.
- Listed height: 6 ft 1 in (1.85 m)
- Listed weight: 190 lb (86 kg)

Career information
- High school: Bridgewater-Raritan West (Bridgewater, New Jersey)
- College: Providence (1987–1991)
- NBA draft: 1991: 1st round, 21st overall pick
- Drafted by: Utah Jazz
- Playing career: 1991–2004
- Position: Point guard
- Number: 14, 3, 5

Career history
- 1991–1992: Utah Jazz
- 1992–1995: Milwaukee Bucks
- 1995–1996: Vancouver Grizzlies
- 1996: Denver Nuggets
- 1996–1997: Fortitudo Bologna
- 1997–1998: Miami Heat
- 1999: New Jersey Nets
- 1999–2000: Los Angeles Clippers
- 2002: Grand Rapids Hoops
- 2002–2003: Virtus Bologna
- 2003: Jersey Squires
- 2003–2004: Idaho Stampede

Career highlights
- CBA All-Star (2003); Consensus second-team All-American (1991); First-team All-Big East (1991); Third-team All-Big East (1989); USBWA Most Courageous Award (1991)

Career NBA statistics
- Points: 5,118 (10.1 ppg)
- Rebounds: 1,261(2.5 rpg)
- Assists: 2,467(4.9 apg)
- Stats at NBA.com
- Stats at Basketball Reference

Eric Lloyd Murdock (born June 14, 1968), nicknamed "Man of Steal", is an American former professional basketball player who was selected by the Utah Jazz in the first round (21st pick overall) of the 1991 NBA draft. Murdock was featured as a playable character in NBA Jam.

== Biography ==
Murdock grew up in Bridgewater Township, New Jersey, where his mother was hit and killed by a reckless driver when he was less than one year old. He played high school basketball at Bridgewater-Raritan High School West.

A 6'1" point guard, Murdock then played at Providence College, and held several school records at the time of his graduation, including most career steals (376, also an NCAA record that held until 2002), most points in conference games in a season (435, also a Big East record), most points in a game (48, another Big East record) and most free throws in a season (238). His skills at PC earned him the nickname "EMT" standing for Eric Murdock Time. Murdock played 9 seasons in the NBA from 1991 to 2000. He played for the Jazz, Milwaukee Bucks, Vancouver Grizzlies, Denver Nuggets, Miami Heat, New Jersey Nets and Los Angeles Clippers.

His best year as a pro came during the 1993–94 season as a member of the Bucks, appearing in 82 games (76 starts) and averaging 15.3 ppg. That same year, he ranked 6th in three-point percentage in the league. The following preseason, while only 26 years old, his career was derailed by an eye injury. Though he recovered later that season, he lost playing time to Lee Mayberry, and never seemed to play as well again upon being traded to the Grizzlies. In his NBA career, Murdock played in 508 games and scored a total of 5,118 points.

He has also played in Italy for Teamsystem Bologna (1996–1997, reached the Italian Championship finals) and Virtus Bologna (2002–2003).

On April 2, 1994, in a game against the Washington Bullets, Murdock stole the ball nine times.

On January 24, 1995, in a game against the Houston Rockets, Murdock scored a 75-footer at the buzzer in the third quarter.

From 2010 to 2012, Murdock served as the director of basketball player development for Rutgers University, working with Rutgers coach Mike Rice. He was fired in July 2012. After his dismissal, Murdock acted as a whistleblower by showing recordings of Rice launching homophobic slurs to players to Rutgers athletic director Tim Pernetti in late 2012, leading to the eventual firing of Rice and the resignation of Pernetti in April 2013. In 2016, Rutgers settled Murdock's wrongful termination lawsuit for $500,000.

In December 2018, Murdock and a fellow airplane passenger filed a federal civil rights lawsuit against United Airlines over alleged racial discrimination and false imprisonment.

Murdock's cousin, Jason Murdock, played college basketball at Providence, as well, from 1993 to 1997.

On November 27, 2018, Murdock filed a lawsuit against United Airlines for racial discrimination. In July 2018, while flying back from the All Star game, he alleged that he was discriminated against by one of United's flight attendants. He claimed that he was then unjustifiably removed from the flight in front of the other passengers, despite the fact that he posed no security risk and committed no wrongful acts. The matter was settled in July 2019, for an undisclosed amount with a stipulation of confidentiality.

== Career statistics ==
Legend
GP	Games played	GS	Games started	MPG	Minutes per game
FG%	Field goal percentage	3P%	3-point field goal percentage	FT%	Free throw percentage
RPG	Rebounds per game	APG	Assists per game	SPG	Steals per game
BPG	Blocks per game	PPG	Points per game	**Bold**	Career high
*	Led the league

=== NBA ===
==== Regular season ====
Year	Team	GP	GS	MPG	FG%	3P%	FT%	RPG	APG	SPG	BPG	PPG
1991–92	Utah	50	0	9.6	.415	.192	.754	1.1	1.8	0.6	0.1	4.1
1992–93	Milwaukee	79	**78**	30.8	**.468**	.261	.780	**3.6**	**7.6**	2.2	0.1	14.4
1993–94	Milwaukee	**82***	76	**30.9**	**.468**	**.411**	.813	3.2	6.7	**2.4**	0.1	**15.3**
1994–95	Milwaukee	75	32	28.8	.415	.375	.790	2.9	6.4	1.5	**0.2**	13.0
1995–96	Milwaukee	9	0	21.4	.364	.261	.667	1.6	3.9	0.7	0.0	6.9
1995–96	Vancouver	64	14	23.1	.422	.320	.809	2.4	4.6	2.0	0.1	9.1
1996–97	Denver	12	0	9.5	.455	.400	**.917**	0.9	2.0	0.8	**0.2**	3.8
1997–98	Miami	**82***	1	17.0	.422	.308	.801	1.9	2.7	1.3	**0.2**	6.2
1998–99	New Jersey	15	8	26.7	.395	.364	.808	2.3	4.4	1.5	0.1	7.9
1999–00	L.A. Clippers	40	15	17.3	.385	.381	.638	1.9	2.7	1.2	0.1	5.6
Career		508	224	23.4	.438	.343	.786	2.5	4.9	1.6	0.1	10.1

==== Playoffs ====
Year	Team	GP	GS	MPG	FG%	3P%	FT%	RPG	APG	SPG	BPG	PPG
1991–92	Utah	3	0	3.7	**.600**	.000	**1.000**	1.0	0.3	0.3	**0.3**	2.7
1997–98	Miami	**5**	0	**25.0**	.344	**.222**	.821	**4.0**	**3.0**	**1.4**	0.0	**9.4**
Career		8	0	17.0	.378	.200	.833	2.9	2.0	1.0	0.1	6.9

=== College ===
Year	Team	GP	GS	MPG	FG%	3P%	FT%	RPG	APG	SPG	BPG	PPG
1987–88	Providence	28	-	27.4	.413	.355	.738	3.0	3.0	3.2	0.1	10.7
1988–89	Providence	29	-	32.3	**.457**	.349	.762	4.7	4.7	3.3	0.3	16.2
1989–90	Providence	28	-	29.8	.419	**.365**	.762	4.1	4.1	2.8	**0.5**	15.4
1990–91	Providence	**32**	-	**34.7**	.445	.350	**.812**	**5.3**	**5.3**	**3.5**	0.2	**25.6**
Career		117	-	31.2	.436	.354	.784	4.3	4.3	3.2	0.3	17.3

== See also ==
- List of NCAA Division I men's basketball career steals leaders
- List of National Basketball Association players with 9 or more steals in a game
