= Chris Kingsbury =

American basketball player (born 1974)

Personal information
- Born: September 18, 1974 (age 52) Omaha, Nebraska, U.S.
- Listed height: 6 ft 5 in (1.96 m)
- Listed weight: 215 lb (98 kg)

Career information
- High school: Hamilton (Hamilton, Ohio)
- College: Iowa (1993–1996)
- NBA draft: 1996: undrafted
- Playing career: 1996–2001
- Position: Shooting guard

Career history
- 1996–1997: La Crosse Bobcats
- 1997–1998: JuveCaserta
- 1999–2001: Cincinnati Stuff

Career highlights
- Second-team All-Big Ten (1995); McDonald's All-American (1993); Fourth-team Parade All-American (1992)

Christopher James Kingsbury (born September 18, 1974) is an American former professional basketball player. A shooting guard who was known for his long range 3-point shooting, he was one of the top ranked players in the 1993 high school class. He played 3 years of college basketball with the Iowa Hawkeyes, and left after his junior year to declare for the 1996 NBA draft. After going undrafted he played in the CBA, the IBL and in Italy before retiring from professional basketball in 2001.

== High school career ==
Kingsbury was born in Omaha, Nebraska and lived in St. Louis, Missouri and Cincinnati, Ohio in his early years. He attended Hamilton High School in Hamilton, Ohio, a suburb of Cincinnati, and he was a starter since his freshman year. He averaged 16.4 points per game as a sophomore, and as a junior he averaged 19.7 points, 7 rebounds and 5 assists per game. He was considered among the top players of his area together with Damon Flint, and one of the top 30 players in the nation by Bob Gibbons, and after the end of his junior season he was selected in the Parade All-America Fourth Team.

As a senior he was averaging 20.5 points, 8.1 rebounds and 3.4 assists per game until the month of February, and finished the season with a 22.2 points per game average. He was one of the top seniors in the nation, and he was selected as a McDonald's All-American: in the 1993 McDonald's game, which was played in Memphis, he scored 2 points, shooting 1/5 from the field. He also won the 3-point shooting contest.

He is the all-time top scorer of Hamilton High School with 1,540 points, and he also holds the record of most 3-point shots made with 184, and most free throws made with 297.

== College career ==
Kingsbury was being recruited by Gary Close of Iowa since the age of 14; he also received offers from Ohio State, Virginia, NC State, Indiana and Michigan. He signed a letter of intent with Iowa in November 1992, and officially signed in April 1993. He chose to wear jersey number 14 and he made his debut in the first game of the season on November 30, 1993 against Drake, playing 21 minutes and scoring 9 points. He played a total of 27 games in his freshman year, starting 3 (against Minnesota, Purdue and Northwestern) and finished the season with averages of 8.1 points, 2.6 rebounds and 1.3 assists in 20.2 minutes per game.

Kingsbury's sophomore season was his best with Iowa. He set the school record for most 3-pointers made in one game with 9 on two occasions: against Drake on November 29, 1994, and against Long Island on December 17, in his first start of the season. He scored a career-high 32 points in 24 minutes against Northwestern on February 9. Kingsbury was given more playing time from coach Tom Davis and he led the team in scoring with a 16.8 points per game average, shooting 39.4% from three and setting a record for most three-pointers in a season with 117; he also led the Big Ten in 3-point field goal attempts. He started 26 of 33 games, averaging 28.2 minutes per game.

In the weeks preceding the start of his junior season Kingsbury was arrested and pleaded guilty to a charge of public intoxication for an incident happened in the lobby of a Holiday Inn hotel in Iowa City, Iowa. This also resulted in a 2-game suspension from preseason exhibition games. On November 24, 1995, during the Great Alaska Shootout, Kingsbury scored 30 points against Connecticut on a 101–95 overtime win: he shot 5/11 from the three point line, and converted 11 of 12 free throws. In the month of February 1996 he received a 3-game suspension unsportsmanlike conduct and missed the games against Northwestern, Indiana and Michigan. His junior season was considered disappointing, as he received less playing time and he finished the season with averages of 11.9 points, 2.3 rebounds and 1.9 assists in 22.9 minutes per game. He led the Big Ten in 3-point field goal attempts for the second consecutive season, and finished his career at Iowa with 1,118 total points and records for most 3-pointers in a game, in a season and in a career. The first two records are still standing as of 2019, while the third one was beaten by Matt Gatens and Jeff Horner.

=== College statistics ===
Year	Team	GP	GS	MPG	FG%	3P%	FT%	RPG	APG	SPG	BPG	PPG
1993–94	Iowa	27	3	20.2	.333	.321	.821	2.6	1.3	0.9	0.1	8.1
1994–95	Iowa	33	26	28.2	.400	.394	.803	2.7	1.7	1.2	0.2	16.8
1995–96	Iowa	29	12	22.9	.341	.308	.796	2.3	1.9	0.6	0.1	11.9
Career		89	41	23.8	.367	.350	.804	2.6	1.6	0.9	0.1	12.6

== Professional career ==
After the end of his junior year at Iowa Kingsbury was facing the possibility of being deemed academically ineligible, and decided to declare for the NBA draft on May 7, 1996. He went undrafted and participated in training camps with the Miami Heat and the Washington Wizards, but was cut by the Wizards before the 1996–97 NBA season. He then joined the La Crosse Bobcats in the CBA, where he played 49 games (3 starts) averaging 5.1 points, 1.3 rebounds and 1.4 assists in 16.5 minutes per game.

He then moved to Italy, signing with JuveCaserta, and played 10 games, averaging 13.1 points, 2.5 rebounds and 0.8 assists in 33.4 minutes per game, shooting 58.6% from the field and 41.2% from three. He scored a season-high 21 points in his debut game against Banco di Sardegna Sassari, shooting 6 for 14 from the field (5/12 from three) and 4 for 5 from the free throw line. However, during his time in Italy he did not receive regular payments, and he therefore decided to come back to the United States. He joined the Cincinnati Stuff of the IBL, and played two seasons before retiring from professional basketball.

After the end of his basketball career he went on to work in a bank in Ponca, Nebraska.
