= Malik Dixon =

American basketball player (born 1975)

Personal information
- Born: September 7, 1975 (age 51) Chicago, Illinois, U.S.
- Listed height: 6 ft 1 in (1.85 m)
- Listed weight: 198 lb (90 kg)

Career information
- High school: St. Francis de Sales (Chicago, Illinois)
- College: Little Rock (1993–1997)
- NBA draft: 1997: undrafted
- Playing career: 1999–2009
- Position: Point guard

Career history
- 1999–2000: Dakota Wizards
- 2000–2001: Limoges CSP
- 2001: Dakota Wizards
- 2001: Den Helder Seals
- 2001–2002: Pallacanestro Biella
- 2002–2003: Dakota Wizards
- 2003: Guaros de Lara
- 2003–2004: Pallacanestro Pavia
- 2004–2005: Maccabi Rishon LeZion
- 2005–2006: Galatasaray
- 2006: Panellinios
- 2006–2007: CB Breogán
- 2007–2008: Hapoel Holon
- 2008–2009: KK Zadar
- 2009: Maccabi Haifa

Career highlights
- Israeli League Top Scorer (2005); Turkish League Top Scorer (2006); CBA All-Star Game (2003)

Malik Dixon (born September 7, 1975) is an American former professional basketball player. He was the top scorer in the 2005 Israel Basketball Premier League.

== Personal life ==
He currently resides in Sydney, and plays amateur basketball at Australia.
