= Joe Courtney (basketball) =

American basketball player

Personal information
- Born: October 17, 1969 (age 57) Jackson, Mississippi, U.S.
- Listed height: 6 ft 9 in (2.06 m)
- Listed weight: 235 lb (107 kg)

Career information
- High school: Callaway (Jackson, Mississippi)
- College: Mississippi State (1987–1989); Southern Miss (1990–1992)
- NBA draft: 1992: undrafted
- Playing career: 1992–2001
- Position: Power forward
- Number: 40, 45, 21

Career history
- 1992–1993: Sioux Falls Skyforce
- 1993: Rockford Lightning
- 1993: Chicago Bulls
- 1993: Golden State Warriors
- 1993–1994: Phoenix Suns
- 1994: Milwaukee Bucks
- 1994–1995: Mexico Aztecas
- 1995: Cholet Basket
- 1995: Rockford Lightning
- 1995–1996: Cleveland Cavaliers
- 1996–1997: Quad City Thunder
- 1997: Philadelphia 76ers
- 1997: La Crosse Bobcats
- 1997: San Antonio Spurs
- 1997: Fórum Valladolid
- 1997–1998: Rockford Lightning
- 1998: Idaho Stampede
- 1998–1999: NKK Sea Hawks
- 1999: Cincinnati Stuff
- 1999–2000: Panteras de Miranda
- 2000–2001: Idaho Stampede
- 2001: Krka Novo Mesto

Career highlights
- CBA All-Rookie First Team (1993)
- Stats at NBA.com
- Stats at Basketball Reference

Joseph Pierre Courtney (born October 17, 1969) is an American former professional basketball player who played in the National Basketball Association (NBA), among other leagues.

Born in Jackson, Mississippi, he played college basketball for both the Mississippi State Bulldogs and Southern Miss Golden Eagles. He played in the NBA for seven different teams, including five games with the 1992–93 NBA champion Chicago Bulls, and also played professionally in France, Spain, Venezuela and Slovenia.

Courtney played in the Continental Basketball Association (CBA) for the Rockford Lightning, Sioux Falls Skyforce, Mexico Aztecas, La Crosse Bobcats, Quad City Thunder and Idaho Stampede from 1992 to 2001. He was selected to the CBA All-Rookie First Team in 1993.

== NBA career statistics ==
Legend
GP	Games played	GS	Games started	MPG	Minutes per game
FG%	Field goal percentage	3P%	3-point field goal percentage	FT%	Free throw percentage
RPG	Rebounds per game	APG	Assists per game	SPG	Steals per game
BPG	Blocks per game	PPG	Points per game	**Bold**	Career high

=== Regular season ===
Year	Team	GP	GS	MPG	FG%	3P%	FT%	RPG	APG	SPG	BPG	PPG
1992–93	Chicago	5	0	6.8	.444	.000	.750	0.4	0.2	**0.4**	0.2	2.2
1992–93	Golden State	7	0	10.0	.391	.000	**.800**	**2.4**	0.3	**0.4**	**0.6**	3.1
1993–94	Phoenix	**33**	**1**	5.1	**.513**	.000	.719	0.8	0.3	0.1	0.2	3.1
1993–94	Milwaukee	19	0	9.3	.386	**.667**	.600	1.5	0.3	**0.4**	0.3	**3.4**
1995–96	Cleveland	23	0	8.7	.429	.000	.444	2.1	**0.4**	0.2	0.3	1.7
1996–97	Philadelphia	4	0	**13.0**	.429	.000	.000	2.3	0.0	0.0	0.0	3.0
1996–97	San Antonio	5	0	9.6	.313	.000	.600	1.4	0.0	0.0	0.0	2.6
Career		96	1	7.8	.433	.667	.633	1.5	0.3	0.2	0.2	2.8
