= Phil Handy =

American basketball player and coach (born 1971)

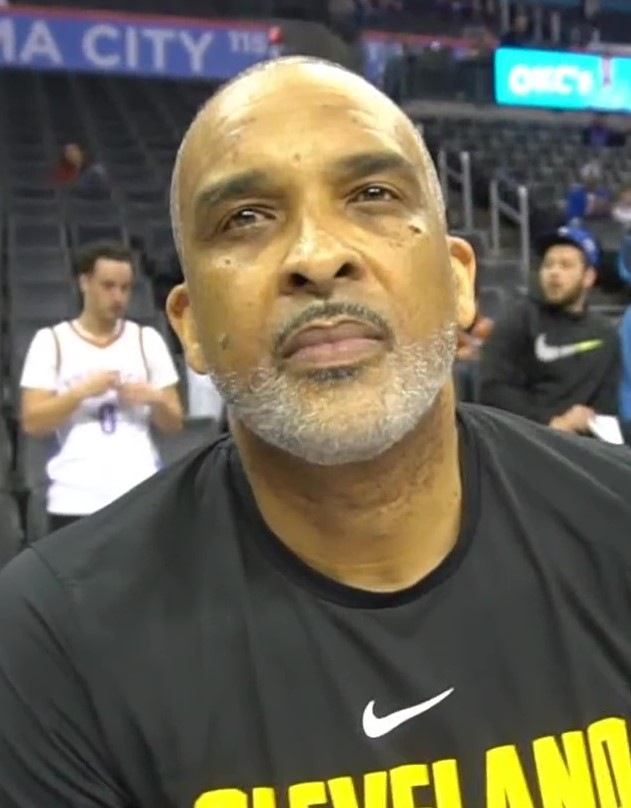
- Handy with the Cleveland Cavaliers in 2018

Philadelphia 76ers
- Title: Assistant coach
- League: NBA

Personal information
- Born: August 24, 1971 (age 55) San Leandro, California, U.S.
- Listed height: 6 ft 5 in (1.96 m)
- Listed weight: 193 lb (88 kg)

Career information
- High school: James Logan (Union City, California)
- College: Skyline College (1992–1993); Hawaii (1993–1995)
- NBA draft: 1995: undrafted
- Playing career: 1995–2002
- Position: Shooting guard
- Coaching career: 2011–present

Career history

Playing
- 1995–1997: Omaha Racers
- 1997: SLUC Nancy Basket
- 1997–1998: Grand Rapids Mackers
- 1998: La Crosse Bobcats
- 1999–2000: Manchester Giants
- 2000–2001: Melbourne Tigers
- 2001–2002: West Sydney Razorbacks

Coaching
- 2011–2013: Los Angeles Lakers (development)
- 2013–2018: Cleveland Cavaliers (assistant)
- 2018–2019: Toronto Raptors (assistant)
- 2019–2024: Los Angeles Lakers (assistant)
- 2025: Mist BC
- 2025–26: Dallas Mavericks (assistant)
- 2026–present: Philadelphia 76ers

Career highlights
- As player: BBL champion (2000); CBA All-Rookie First Team (1996); As assistant coach: 3× NBA champion (2016, 2019, 2020); NBA Cup champion (2023)

Philip Tony Handy (born August 24, 1971) is an American basketball coach who currently serves as an assistant coach for the Philadelphia 76ers of the National Basketball Association (NBA). He has previously served as an assistant coach for the Los Angeles Lakers and Dallas Mavericks of the NBA, and player development trainer. He played college basketball for the Hawaii Rainbow Warriors, and then played professionally abroad before starting his career in coaching.

== Early life ==
Born in San Leandro, California, he grew up in Hayward - Union City, California.

== College career ==
After a year of junior college, Handy attended University of Hawaii from 1993 to 1995. During his tenure with the Rainbows he was a WAC champion, and first Team All defense selection.

== Professional career ==
Handy played for the Golden State Warriors and Portland Trail Blazers during the pre-season, in the Continental Basketball Association for the Omaha Racers, Grand Rapids Mackers (via dispersal draft from Omaha), La Crosse Bobcats (rights traded to Fort Wayne Fury on 12 October 1998) and internationally in France (SLUC Nancy Basket), Italy, Germany, Spain, Israel (Maccabi Hadera), England (Manchester Giants), and Australia (Melbourne Tigers and West Sydney Razorbacks). Never a crowd favourite Razorback fans took particular delight in chanting "You're useless Handy".

He obtained a CBA All-Rookie First Team (1995–96), and a British Basketball League championship with the Manchester Giants in the season 1999–2000.

== Coaching career ==
Handy has served as player development coach for the Los Angeles Lakers under Mike Brown. Still under Brown, he served as assistant coach with the Cleveland Cavaliers. He then moved to the Toronto Raptors as assistant for Nick Nurse. He then moved back to the Lakers under Frank Vogel.

Handy went to 6 consecutive NBA Finals, 4 with the Cleveland Cavaliers (2015–2018), 1 with the Toronto Raptors (2019), and 1 with the Los Angeles Lakers (2020) winning championships in 2016, 2019, and 2020.

On November 15, 2024, Handy was announced to be one of the six new head coaches of the Unrivaled basketball league.

On July 9, 2025, the Dallas Mavericks hired Handy as part of their coaching staff under head coach Jason Kidd.

On August 31, 2026, the Philadelphia 76ers announced Handy has joined their coaching staff.
