= 2004 NBA draft =

Basketball player selection

General information
- Sport: Basketball
- Date: June 24, 2004
- Location: The Theater at Madison Square Garden (New York City, New York)
- Network: ESPN

Overview
- 59 total selections in 2 rounds
- League: NBA
- First selection: Dwight Howard (Orlando Magic)
- Hall of Famers: 1: C Dwight Howard

The 2004 NBA draft was held on June 24, 2004, at The Theater at Madison Square Garden in New York City, and was broadcast live on ESPN at 7:00 pm (EDT). In this draft, National Basketball Association teams took turns selecting amateur college basketball players and other first-time eligible players. The NBA announced that 56 college and high school players and 38 international players had filed as early-entry candidates for the 2004 draft. On May 26, the NBA draft lottery was conducted for the teams that did not make the NBA playoffs in the 2003–04 NBA season. The Orlando Magic, who had a 25 percent chance of obtaining the first selection, won the lottery, while the Los Angeles Clippers and the Chicago Bulls were second and third respectively. As an expansion team, the Charlotte Bobcats had been assigned the fourth selection in the draft and did not participate in the lottery. The Minnesota Timberwolves forfeited their first-round pick due to salary cap violations.

By the end of the draft, around 40% of the players selected in it were born from countries outside the United States. It would remain the highest influx of international players selected in the modern NBA draft era until the 2016 NBA draft, where almost half of the selected players were born in countries outside the US. In addition, four of the players selected in the draft were Russians, which not only marked the highest number of Russian-born players to be taken in one draft, but also was the highest representation of a country other than the US in one draft until 2016 when five Frenchmen would be taken in the draft.

The second-overall pick, Emeka Okafor out of Connecticut, the Bobcats' historical first rookie draft pick back when they were considered an expansion franchise, was named Rookie of the Year. Third-overall pick Ben Gordon, also out of Connecticut, earned the Sixth Man of the Year Award, becoming the first rookie in NBA history to do so.

Dwight Howard has become an NBA Champion, eight-time All-Star, has received eight All-NBA selections, and a three-time NBA Defensive Player of the Year awardee. He also had the distinction as the only NBA player straight out of high school to start all 82 games as a rookie. There are also four other players that would be named All-Stars at some point in their careers, and Al Jefferson would be named to an All-NBA team. Andre Iguodala would win four championships with the Golden State Warriors and was named Finals MVP in 2015. The draft is also notable for multiple players coming straight from high school being drafted within a few picks from each other. As of the end of the 2022–23 NBA season, Andre Iguodala was the last remaining active player from the 2004 class. Iguodala announced his retirement in 2023.

== Draft selections ==
G	Guard	F	Forward	C	Center

^	Denotes player who has been inducted to the Naismith Memorial Basketball Hall of Fame
*	Denotes player who has been selected for at least one All-Star Game and All-NBA Team
^{+}	Denotes player who has been selected for at least one All-Star Game
^{x}	Denotes player who has been selected for at least one All-NBA Team
^{#}	Denotes player who has never appeared in an NBA regular-season or playoff game
^{~}	Denotes player who has been selected as Rookie of the Year

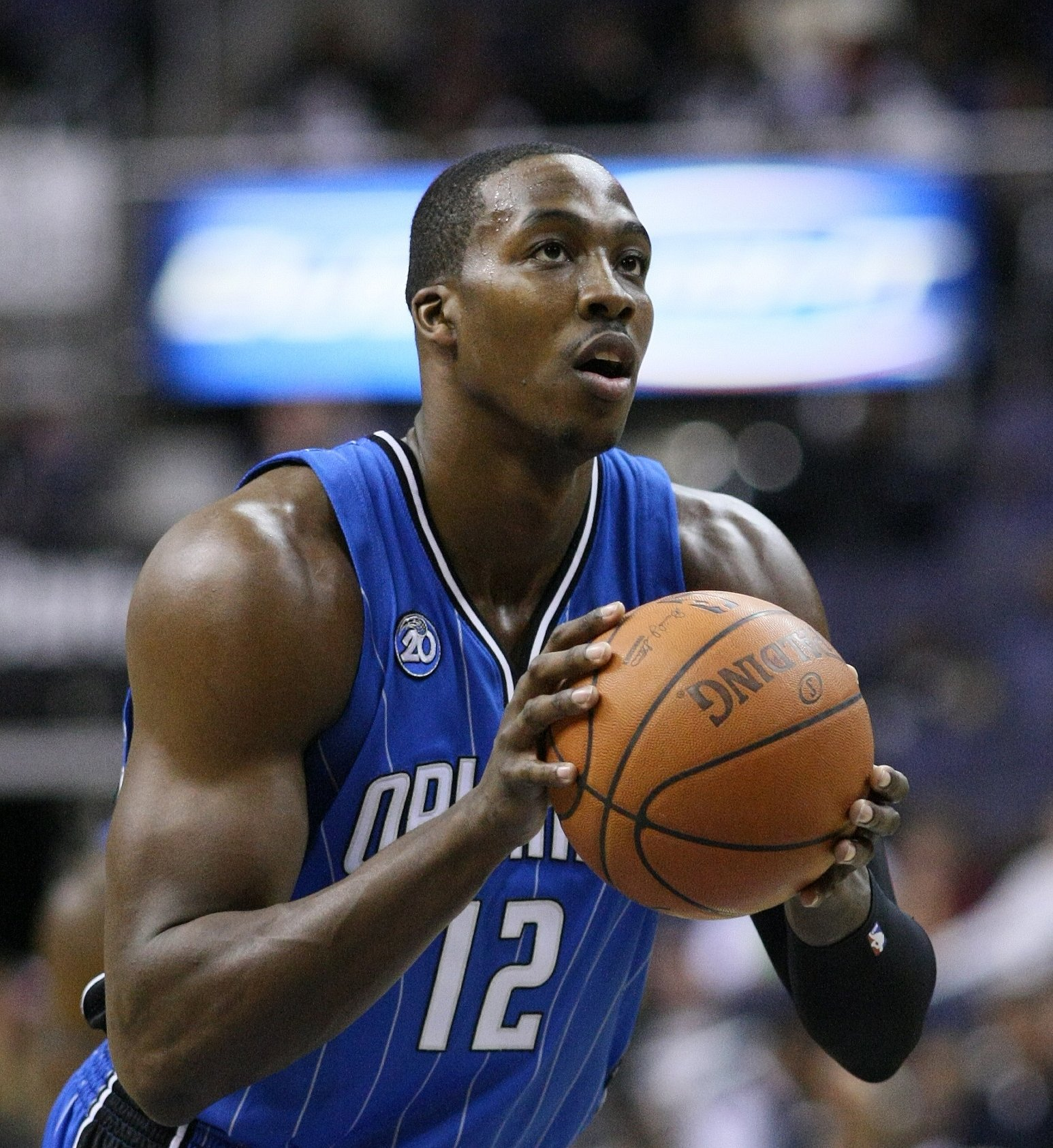
Dwight Howard, the 1st pick of the Orlando Magic

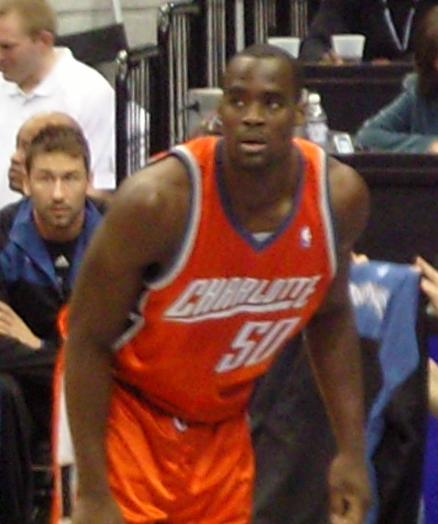
Emeka Okafor, the 2nd pick of the Charlotte Bobcats

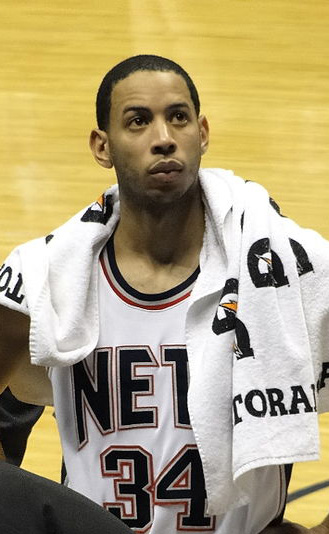
Devin Harris, the 5th pick of the Washington Wizards (traded to Dallas)

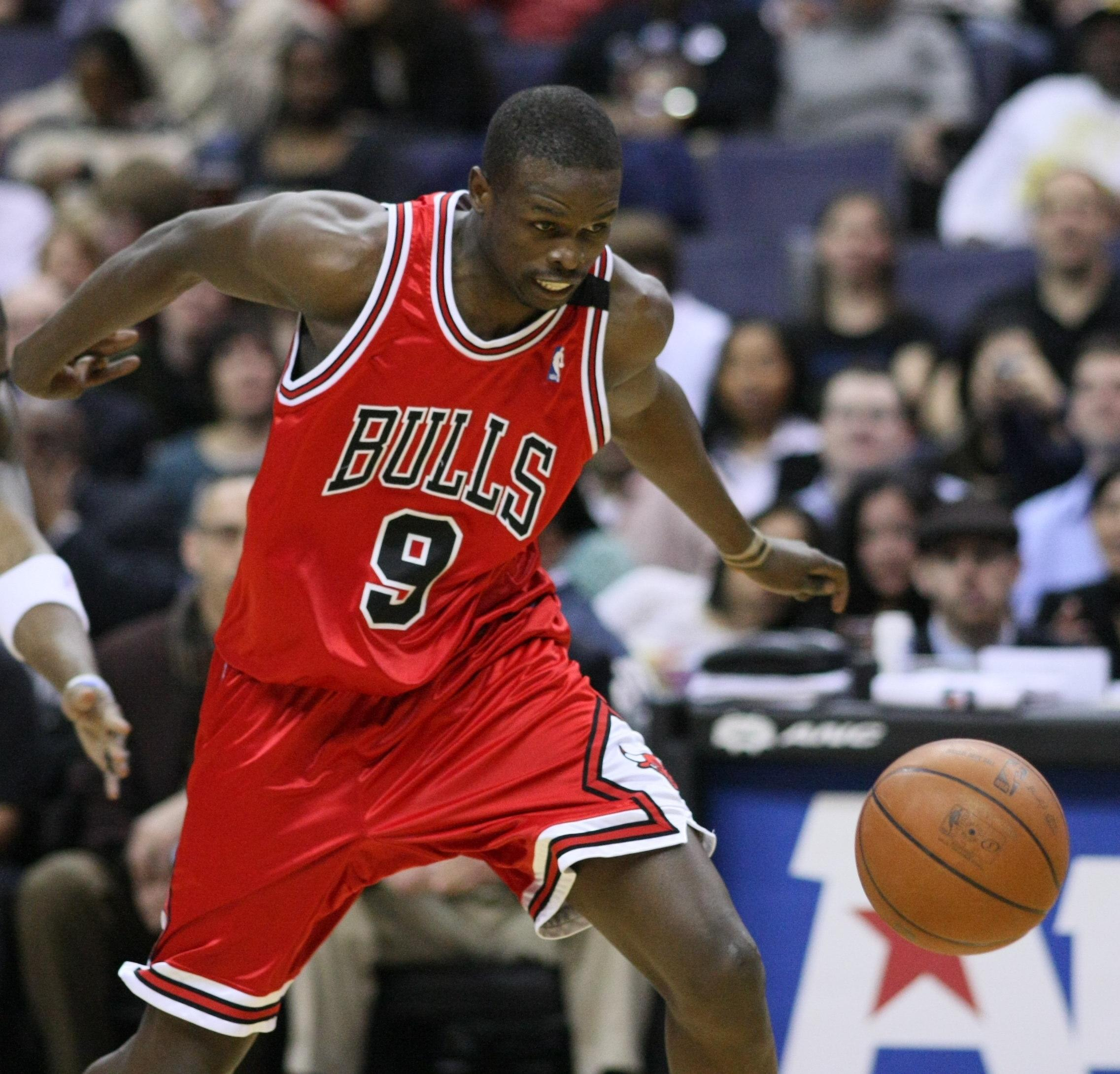
Luol Deng, the 7th pick of the Phoenix Suns (traded to Chicago)

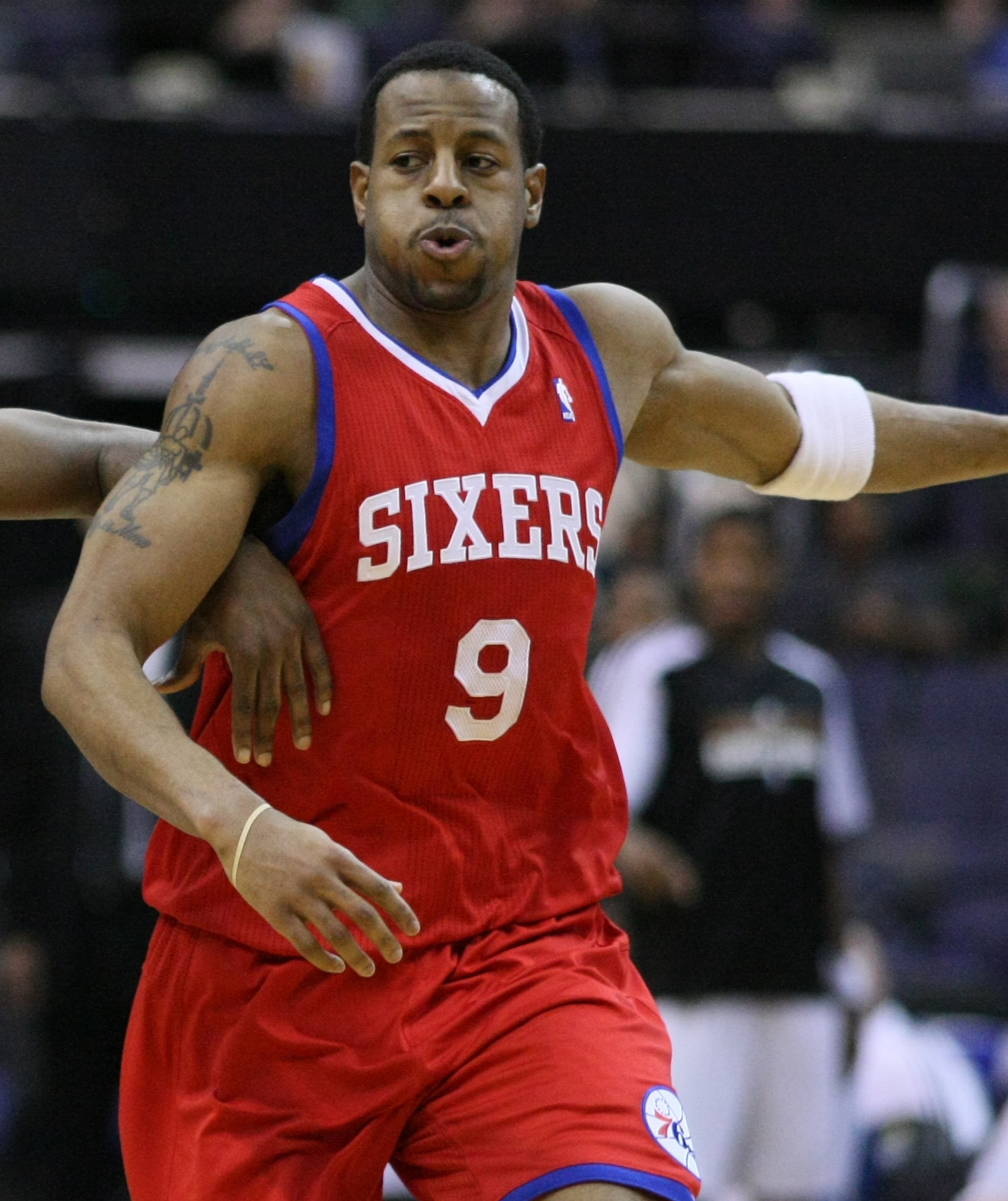
Andre Iguodala, the 9th pick of the Philadelphia 76ers

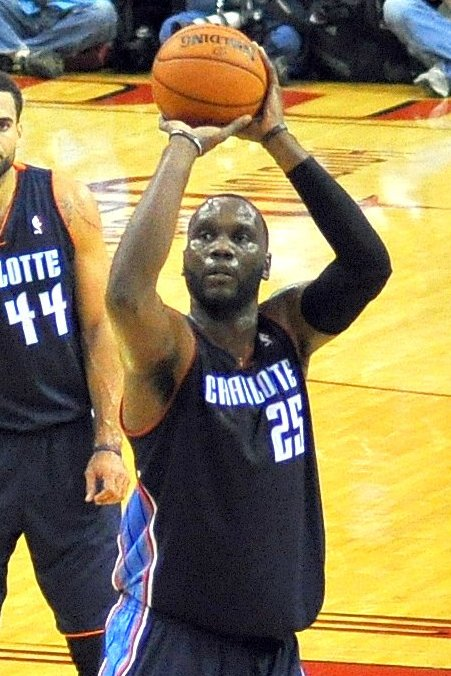
Al Jefferson, the 15th pick of the Boston Celtics

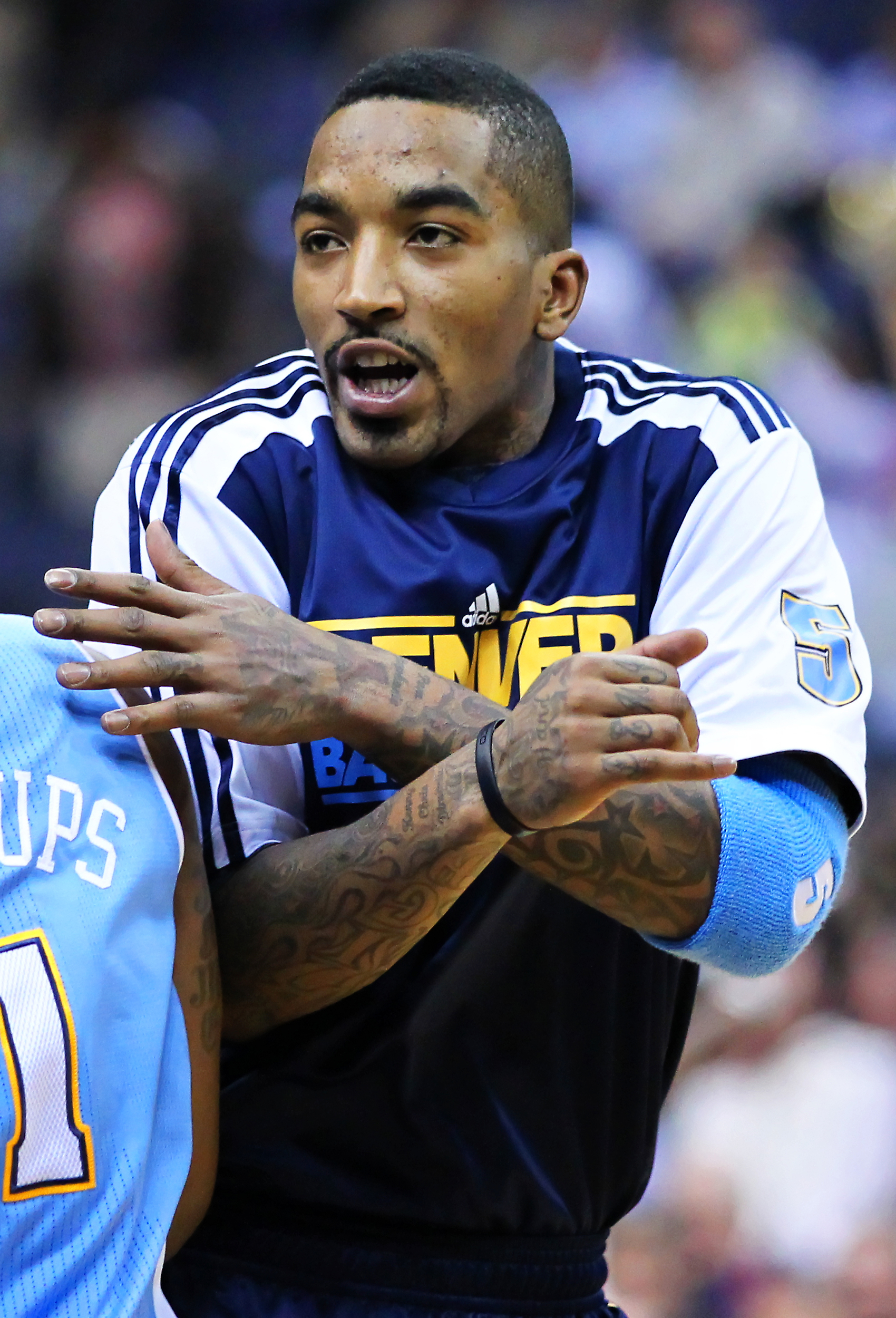
J. R. Smith, the 18th pick of the New Orleans Hornets

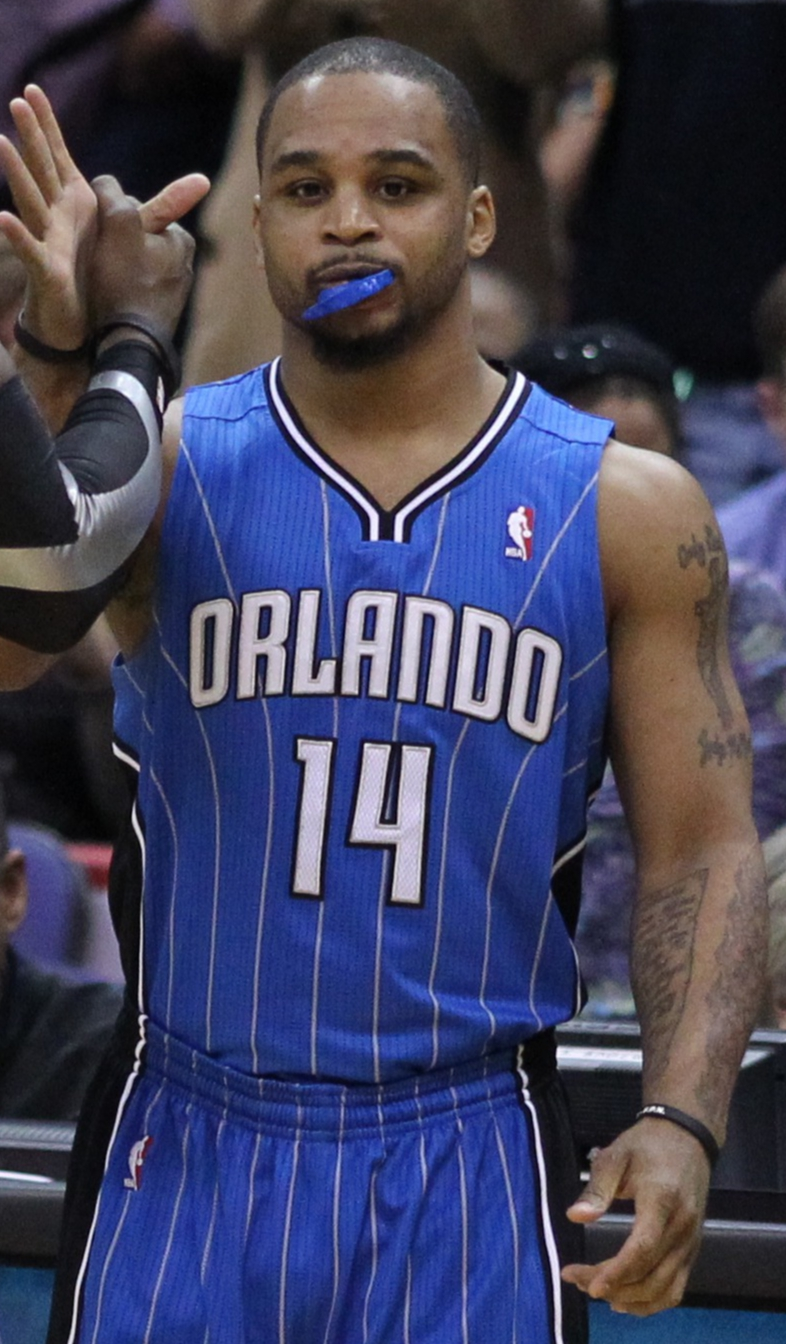
Jameer Nelson, the 20th pick of the Denver Nuggets (traded to Orlando)

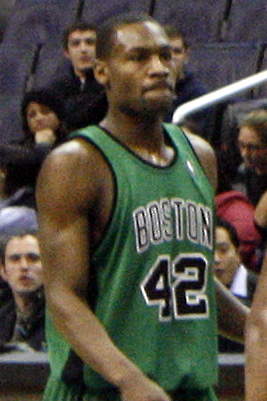
Tony Allen, the 25th pick of the Boston Celtics

Round	Pick	Player	Position	Nationality (Note: Nationality indicates the player's national team or representative nationality. If a player has not competed at the international level, then the nationality indicates the national team which the player is eligible to represent according to FIBA rules.)	Team	School/club team
1	1	Dwight Howard^	C/PF	United States	Orlando Magic	Southwest Atlanta Christian Academy (Atlanta)
1	2	Emeka Okafor^{~}	PF/C	United States; Nigeria	Charlotte Bobcats (from L.A. Clippers)	Connecticut (Jr.)
1	3	Ben Gordon	SG	United Kingdom	Chicago Bulls	Connecticut (Jr.)
1	4	Shaun Livingston	PG	United States	Los Angeles Clippers (from Charlotte)	Peoria HS (Peoria, Illinois)
1	5	Devin Harris^{+}	PG	United States	Washington Wizards (traded to Dallas)	Wisconsin (Jr.)
1	6	Josh Childress	G/F	United States	Atlanta Hawks	Stanford (Jr.)
1	7	Luol Deng^{+}	SF	United Kingdom	Phoenix Suns (traded to Chicago)	Duke (Fr.)
1	8	Rafael Araújo	C	Brazil	Toronto Raptors	BYU (Sr.)
1	9	Andre Iguodala^{+}	SF	United States	Philadelphia 76ers	Arizona (So.)
1	10	Luke Jackson	SF	United States	Cleveland Cavaliers	Oregon (Sr.)
1	11	Andris Biedriņš	C	Latvia	Golden State Warriors	Skonto (Latvia)
1	12	Robert Swift	C	United States	Seattle SuperSonics	Bakersfield HS (Bakersfield, California)
1	13	Sebastian Telfair	PG	United States	Portland Trail Blazers	Lincoln HS (Brooklyn, New York)
1	14	Kris Humphries	PF	United States	Utah Jazz	Minnesota (Fr.)
1	15	Al Jefferson^{x}	PF/C	United States	Boston Celtics	Prentiss HS (Prentiss, Mississippi)
1	16	Kirk Snyder	SG	United States	Utah Jazz (from New York via Phoenix)	Nevada (Jr.)
1	17	Josh Smith	SF	United States	Atlanta Hawks (from Milwaukee via Denver and Detroit)	Oak Hill Academy (Mouth of Wilson, Virginia)
1	18	J. R. Smith	SG	United States	New Orleans Hornets	St. Benedict's Prep (Newark, New Jersey)
1	19	Dorell Wright	SF	United States	Miami Heat	South Kent School (South Kent, Connecticut)
1	20	Jameer Nelson^{+}	PG	United States	Denver Nuggets (traded to Orlando)	Saint Joseph's (Sr.)
1	21	Pavel Podkolzin	C	Russia	Utah Jazz (from Houston, traded to Dallas)	Metis Varese (Italy)
1	22	Victor Khryapa	SF	Russia	New Jersey Nets (traded to Portland)	CSKA Moscow (Russia)
1	23	Sergei Monia	SG	Russia	Portland Trail Blazers (from Memphis)	CSKA Moscow (Russia)
1	24	Delonte West	PG	United States	Boston Celtics (from Dallas)	Saint Joseph's (Jr.)
1	25	Tony Allen	SG	United States	Boston Celtics (from Detroit)	Oklahoma State (Sr.)
1	26	Kevin Martin	SG	United States	Sacramento Kings	Western Carolina (Jr.)
1	27	Saša Vujačić	SG	Slovenia	Los Angeles Lakers	Snaidero Udine (Italy)
1	28	Beno Udrih	PG	Slovenia	San Antonio Spurs	Breil Milano (Italy)
1	29	David Harrison	C	United States	Indiana Pacers	Colorado (Jr.)
1	–	Forfeited Pick			Minnesota Timberwolves (forfeited their first-round pick due to salary cap violations)	
2	30	Anderson Varejão	C	Brazil	Orlando Magic (traded to Cleveland)	FC Barcelona (Spain)
2	31	Jackson Vroman	C	Lebanon	Chicago Bulls (traded to Phoenix)	Iowa State (Sr.)
2	32	Peter John Ramos	C	Puerto Rico	Washington Wizards	Caguas (Puerto Rico)
2	33	Lionel Chalmers	PG	United States	Los Angeles Clippers (from Charlotte)	Xavier (Sr.)
2	34	Donta Smith	SF	United States	Atlanta Hawks	Southeastern Illinois (So.)
2	35	Andre Emmett	F/G	United States	Seattle SuperSonics (from L.A. Clippers, traded to Memphis)	Texas Tech (Sr.)
2	36	Antonio Burks	PG	United States	Orlando Magic (from Phoenix, traded to Memphis)	Memphis (Sr.)
2	37	Royal Ivey	PG	United States	Atlanta Hawks (from Philadelphia)	Texas (Sr.)
2	38	Chris Duhon	PG	United States	Chicago Bulls (from Toronto)	Duke (Sr.)
2	39	Albert Miralles^{#}	PF	Spain	Toronto Raptors (from Cleveland, traded to Miami)	Roseto Basket (Italy)
2	40	Justin Reed	SF	United States	Boston Celtics	Mississippi (Sr.)
2	41	David Young^{#}	G	United States	Seattle SuperSonics	North Carolina Central (Sr.)
2	42	Viktor Sanikidze^{#}	SF	Georgia	Atlanta Hawks (from Golden State via Philadelphia and Orlando, traded to San Antonio)	Dijon (France)
2	43	Trevor Ariza	SF	United States	New York Knicks	UCLA (Fr.)
2	44	Tim Pickett^{#}	SG	United States	New Orleans Hornets	Florida State (Sr.)
2	45	Bernard Robinson	SF	United States	Charlotte Bobcats (from Milwaukee)	Michigan (Sr.)
2	46	Ha Seung-Jin	C	South Korea	Portland Trail Blazers	Yonsei University (South Korea)
2	47	Pape Sow	PF	Senegal	Miami Heat (traded to Toronto)	Cal State Fullerton (Sr.)
2	48	Ricky Minard^{#}	SG	United States	Sacramento Kings (from Utah)	Morehead State (Sr.)
2	49	Serhiy Lishchuk^{#}	PF	Ukraine	Memphis Grizzlies (from Denver via Orlando)	Khimik Yuzhny (Ukraine)
2	50	Vassilis Spanoulis	PG	Greece	Dallas Mavericks (from Houston via Denver, traded to Houston)	Maroussi (Greece)
2	51	Christian Drejer^{#}	SF	Denmark	New Jersey Nets	FC Barcelona (Spain)
2	52	Romain Sato^{#}	SG	Central African Republic	San Antonio Spurs (from Memphis)	Xavier (Sr.)
2	53	Matt Freije	SF	Lebanon	Miami Heat (from Dallas)	Vanderbilt (Sr.)
2	54	Rickey Paulding^{#}	SG	United States	Detroit Pistons	Missouri (Sr.)
2	55	Luis Flores	PG	Dominican Republic	Houston Rockets (from Sacramento via Utah, traded to Golden State via Dallas)	Manhattan (Sr.)
2	56	Marcus Douthit^{#}	PF	United States	Los Angeles Lakers	Providence (Sr.)
2	57	Sergei Karaulov^{#}	G	Russia	San Antonio Spurs	Skha Jakutia Yakutsk (Russia)
2	58	Blake Stepp^{#}	PG	United States	Minnesota Timberwolves	Gonzaga (Sr.)
2	59	Rashad Wright^{#}	G	United States	Indiana Pacers	Georgia (Sr.)

== Notable undrafted players ==
These players not selected in the draft have played at least one game in the NBA.

Player	Position	Nationality	School/club team
Pero Antić	C	Macedonia	AEK Athens (Greece) 1982
Andre Barrett	PG	United States	Seton Hall (Sr.)
Tony Bobbitt	SG	United States	Cincinnati (Sr.)
Andre Brown	C/PF	United States	DePaul (Sr.)
Jackie Butler	C/PF	United States	Coastal Christian Academy (Virginia Beach, Virginia) (HS Sr.)
Erik Daniels	SF	United States	Kentucky (Sr.)
John Edwards	C	United States	Kent State (Sr.)
Desmon Farmer	SG	United States	USC (Sr.)
Gerald Fitch	SG	United States	Kentucky (Sr.)
Hamed Haddadi	C	Iran	Paykan Tehran (Iran) 1985
Renaldo Major	SF	United States	Fresno State (Sr.)
Jared Reiner	C	United States	Iowa (Sr.)
James Thomas	PF	United States	Texas (Sr.)
Damien Wilkins	SF	United States	Georgia (Sr.)

== Early entrants ==
=== College underclassmen ===
After seeing a couple of years where they missed the previous year of 75 underclassmen testing their early entry in 2001, this year saw an at the time record-high 92 players declare their initial entry into this year's draft. However, this year also saw an at the time record high 52 underclassmen from college, overseas, or high school withdraw their names from the draft, thus leaving only 40 total underclassmen officially declaring their entry into the NBA draft. The following college basketball players successfully applied for early draft entrance.

- (United States) Chris Acker – G, Chaminade (sophomore)
- (United States) Trevor Ariza – G/F, UCLA (freshman)
- (United States) Brandon Bender – F, Robert Morris (junior)
- (United States) Evan Burns – F, San Diego State (freshman)
- (United States) Josh Childress – F/G, Stanford (junior)
- (United States) Cortez Davis – F, Midland College (sophomore)
- (United Kingdom) Luol Deng – F, Duke (freshman)
- (United Kingdom) / (United States) Ben Gordon – G, Connecticut (junior)
- (United States) Devin Harris – G, Wisconsin (junior)
- (United States) David Harrison – C, Colorado (junior)
- (United States) JaQuan Hart – G, Eastern Michigan (junior)
- (United States) Kris Humphries – F, Minnesota (freshman)
- (Nigeria) Sani Ibrahim – F, Gulf Coast CC (sophomore)
- (United States) Andre Iguodala – F, Arizona (sophomore)
- (United States) Kevin Martin – G, Western Carolina (junior)
- (United States) Emeka Okafor – F, Connecticut (junior)
- (United States) Randy Orr – C, Georgia Perimeter (sophomore)
- (United States) Jason Parker – F, Chipola (junior)
- (United States) Donta Smith – F/G, Southeastern Illinois (sophomore)
- (United States) Kirk Snyder – G, Nevada (junior)
- (United States) Harvey Thomas – F, Baylor (junior)
- (United States) Delonte West – G, St. Joseph's (junior)

=== High school players ===
This would be the tenth straight year in a row where at least one high school player would declare their entry into the NBA draft directly out of high school after previously only allowing it one time back in 1975. It would also be famous for marking the third (and currently final) time that a #1 pick was selected directly out of high school. This year also saw players like LaMarcus Aldridge, Jermaine Bell, Ivan Chiriaev, and Maurice Shaw all initially declare entry for this year's draft, but ultimately withdraw from it and decide to enter college instead. The following high school players successfully applied for early draft entrance.

- (United States) Jackie Butler – F, Coastal Christian Academy (Virginia Beach, Virginia)
- (United States) Dwight Howard – C, Southwest Atlanta Christian Academy (Atlanta, Georgia)
- (United States) Al Jefferson – F, Prentiss HS (Prentiss, Mississippi)
- (United States) Shaun Livingston – G, Peoria HS (Peoria, Illinois)
- (United States) J. R. Smith – G, St. Benedict's Prep (Newark, New Jersey)
- (United States) Josh Smith – F, Oak Hill Academy (Mouth of Wilson, Virginia)
- (United States) Robert Swift – C, Bakersfield HS (Bakersfield, California)
- (United States) Dorell Wright – G/F, South Kent (South Kent, Connecticut)
- (United States) Sebastian Telfair – G, Lincoln HS (Brooklyn, New York)

=== International players ===
The following international players successfully applied for early draft entrance.

- Andris Biedriņš – F, Skonto (Latvia)
- Hamed Haddadi – C, Paykan Tehran (Iran)
- Arturas Kaubrys – F, Neptūnas (Lithuania)
- Sergei Monia – G/F, CSKA Moscow (Russia)
- (Russia) Pavel Podkolzin – C, Metis Varese (Italy)
- Peter John Ramos – C, Criollos de Caguas (Puerto Rico)
- Jaber Rouzbahani – C, Zob Ahan Isfahan (Iran)
- Ha Seung-jin – C, Yonsei University (South Korea)
- Jerry Sokoloski – C, Father Henry Carr Catholic Secondary (Canada)
- (Slovenia) Sasha Vujačić – G, Snaidero Udine (Italy)

=== Automatically eligible entrants ===
Players who do not meet the criteria for "international" players are automatically eligible if they meet any of the following criteria:

- They have no remaining college eligibility.
- If they graduated from high school in the U.S., but did not enroll in a U.S. college or university, four years have passed since their high school class graduated.
- They have signed a contract with a professional basketball team not in the NBA, anywhere in the world, and have played under the contract.

Players who meet the criteria for "international" players are automatically eligible if they meet any of the following criteria:

- They are at least 22 years old during the calendar year of the draft. In term of dates players born on or before December 31, 1982, were automatically eligible for the 2004 draft.
- They have signed a contract with a professional basketball team not in the NBA within the United States, and have played under that contract.

Other automatically eligible players
Player	Team	Note	Ref.
(Australia) Adam Caporn	Wollongong Hawks (Australia)	Left Saint Mary's in 2003; playing professionally since the 2003–04 season	

== Invited attendees ==
The 2004 NBA draft is considered to be the 26th NBA draft to have utilized what is properly considered the "green room" experience for NBA prospects. The NBA's green room is a staging area where anticipated draftees often sit with their families and representatives, waiting for their names to be called on draft night. Often being positioned either in front of or to the side of the podium (in this case, being positioned somewhere within The Theater at Madison Square Garden), once a player heard his name, he would walk to the podium to shake hands and take promotional photos with the NBA commissioner. From there, the players often conducted interviews with various media outlets while backstage. From there, the players often conducted interviews with various media outlets while backstage. However, once the NBA draft started to air nationally on TV starting with the 1980 NBA draft, the green room evolved from players waiting to hear their name called and then shaking hands with these select players who were often called to the hotel to take promotional pictures with the NBA commissioner a day or two after the draft concluded to having players in real-time waiting to hear their names called up and then shaking hands with David Stern, the NBA's commissioner at the time.

The NBA compiled its list of green room invites through collective voting by the NBA's team presidents and general managers alike, which in this year's case belonged to only what they believed were the top 15 prospects at the time. Despite the higher amount of invites for this year's draft when compared to the previous year's draft, there would still be a couple of discrepancies involved with the invitations at hand with the missing invitation for #10 pick Luke Jackson and the missing invite for future All-NBA Team member Al Jefferson. With that in mind, the following players were invited to attend this year's draft festivities live and in person.

- (Brazil) Rafael Araújo – C, Brigham Young
- (United Kingdom) / (United States) Ben Gordon – SG, Connecticut
- Andris Biedriņš – C, Skonto Rīga (Latvia)
- (United States) Josh Childress – SG/SF, Stanford
- (United Kingdom) / (Sudan) / (South Sudan) Luol Deng – SF/PF, Duke
- (United States) Devin Harris – PG, Wisconsin
- (United States) Dwight Howard – C, Southwest Atlanta Christian Academy (Atlanta, Georgia)
- (United States) Andre Iguodala – SG/SF, Arizona
- (United States) Shaun Livingston – PG, Peoria Central High School (Peoria, Illinois)
- Sergei Monia – SG/SF, PBC CSKA Moscow (Russia)
- (United States) Jameer Nelson – PG, Saint Joseph's
- (United States) / (Nigeria) Emeka Okafor – PF/C, Connecticut
- (Russia) Pavel Podkolzin – C, Metis Varese (Italy)
- (United States) Josh Smith – SF/PF, Oak Hill Academy (Mouth of Wilson, Virginia)
- (United States) Kirk Snyder – SG, Nevada

== See also ==
- List of first overall NBA draft picks
