= Jerry Sokoloski =

Canadian actor and basketball player

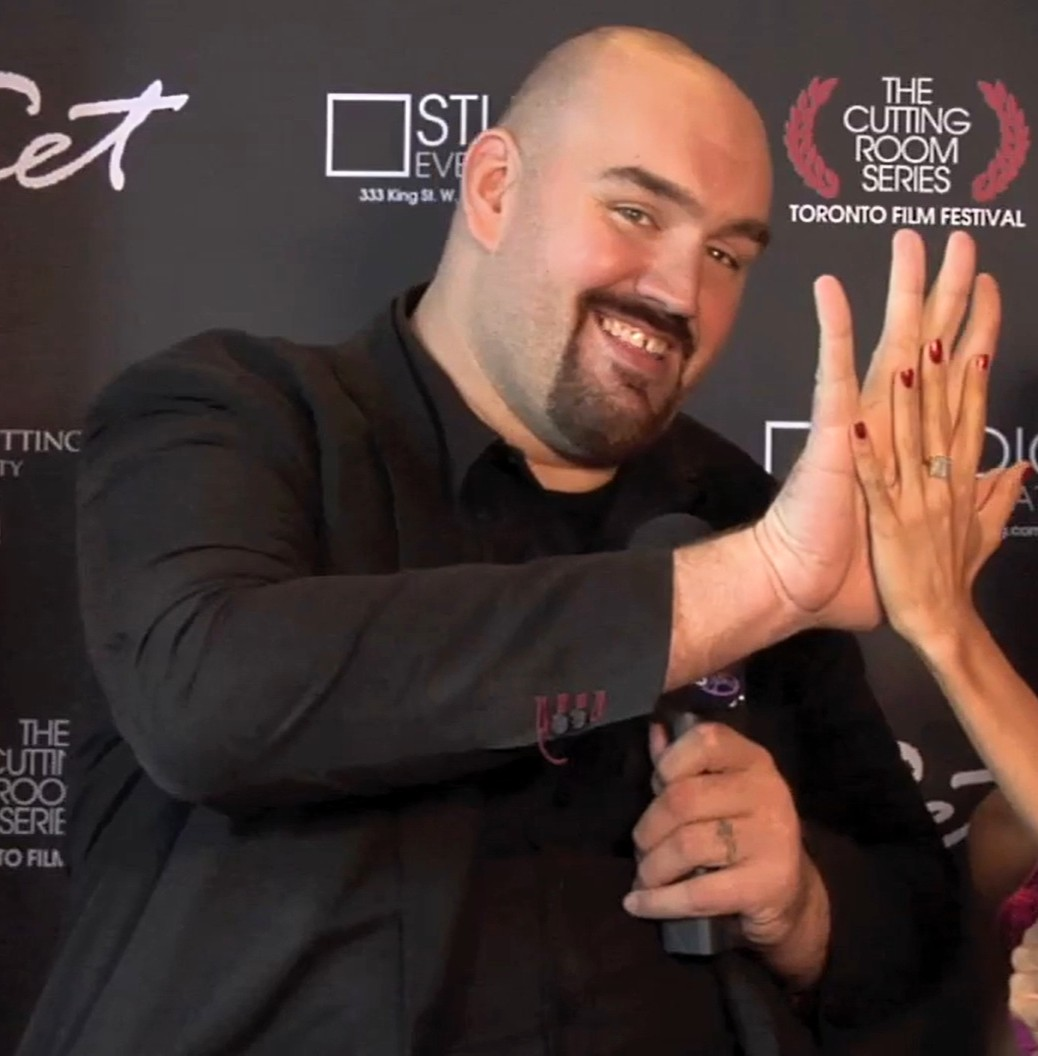
- Sokoloski in 2014

Personal information
- Born: May 6, 1983 (age 43) Winnipeg, Manitoba, Canada
- Listed height: 7 ft 5 in (2.26 m)
- Listed weight: 150 kg (331 lb)

Career information
- High school: Silverthorn Collegiate Institute (Toronto, Ontario); Chinguacousy (Toronto, Ontario); Father Henry Carr (Toronto, Ontario)
- NBA draft: 2004: undrafted
- Position: Center

Jerry Sokoloski (born May 6, 1983, Winnipeg) is a Canadian actor and one of the tallest people in Canada. In November 2007, The Guinness Book of World Records measured him at 7 feet and 4 1/2 inches and in 2008, they certified him as the tallest man in Canada and is Managed by M Models and Talent Agency He has since been surpassed by Sim Bhullar who measures 7'5" tall. Sokoloski was measured whilst wearing sneakers with a heel height of 2" on the Canadian morning show Breakfast Television at 7'4".

== Basketball ==
Sokoloski played high school basketball in Canada for Silverthorn Collegiate Institute before transferring to Chinguacousy High School and Father Henry Carr Catholic Secondary School. He missed his senior season due to eligibility issues after transferring schools. He did not play college basketball but declared himself eligible for the NBA draft in 2004 and had workouts with a number of NBA teams but was not drafted.
