= Tremaine Fowlkes =

American basketball player (born 1976)

Personal information
- Born: April 11, 1976 (age 50) Los Angeles, California, U.S.
- Listed height: 6 ft 8 in (2.03 m)
- Listed weight: 220 lb (100 kg)

Career information
- High school: Crenshaw (Los Angeles, California)
- College: California (1994–1996); Fresno State (1997–1998)
- NBA draft: 1998: 2nd round, 54th overall pick
- Drafted by: Denver Nuggets
- Playing career: 1998–2007
- Position: Small forward
- Number: 32, 24, 3

Career history
- 1998–1999: Yakima Sun Kings
- 1999–2000: Cincinnati Stuff
- 2000–2001: Gaiteros del Zulia
- 2001–2002: Columbus Riverdragons
- 2002–2003: Los Angeles Clippers
- 2003–2004: Detroit Pistons
- 2004: Indiana Pacers
- 2004–2005: Florida Flame
- 2006–2007: Dakota Wizards

Career highlights
- NBA champion (2004); All-NBDL First Team (2002); Pac-10 Freshman of the Year (1995); Fourth-team Parade All-American (1994)
- Stats at NBA.com
- Stats at Basketball Reference
Medals
Men's basketball
Representing United States
FIBA Americas U18 Championship
Gold medal – first place	1994 Santa Rosa	Team competition

Tremaine J. Fowlkes (born April 11, 1976) is an American former professional basketball player at the small forward position. Fowlkes was drafted out of Fresno State by the Denver Nuggets with the 54th pick of the 1998 NBA draft, though he did not make an NBA on-court appearance until the 2001–02 season. He has played for the Los Angeles Clippers (two seasons), Detroit Pistons (one season, winning the 2003–04 championship) and Indiana Pacers (one season) of the NBA, averaging 3 points and 2.2 rebounds in 103 career games. He also appeared for the New Orleans Hornets during the 2004 preseason.

Fowlkes was one of three players (the others being Britton Johnsen and Marcus Haislip) signed to prorated one-year contracts in the immediate aftermath of the Pacers–Pistons brawl on November 19, 2004, which devastated the Pacers' already banged-up lineup with the suspensions of their three best players, Ron Artest, Jermaine O'Neal and Stephen Jackson.
