= La Crosse Bobcats =

Basketball team located in La Crosse, Wisconsin

- Leagues: CBA
- Founded: 1996
- Dissolved: 2001
- Arena: La Crosse Center
- Location: La Crosse, Wisconsin
- Team colors: red, purple, white

The La Crosse Bobcats were a Continental Basketball Association (CBA) basketball team located in La Crosse, Wisconsin, from 1996 to the league's bankruptcy in February 2001. The Bobcats were the second CBA team located in La Crosse; previously, the La Crosse Catbirds played from 1985 to 1994. The team hosted its matches at the La Crosse Center.

Don Zierden served as the Bobcats head coach during their inaugural 1996–97 season. The team held their first open tryouts at Viterbo College from October 25 to October 27, 1996.

In 1997, the Bobcats marketing campaign featured commercials depicting La Crosse players hawking sub-par team endorsed products in a home shopping parody. The team's tagline for the commercials was, "Lousy endorsements. Great basketball". No actual La Crosse players were in the commercials since they were filmed during the off-season, so actors were used.

During the 1999 CBA draft, the Bobcats selected former Wisconsin Badgers forward Sam Okey in the eighth round. Okey declined a contract from La Crosse, opting to play in a Turkish professional league. In September 2000, the Bobcats announced that Okey had signed a contract for the upcoming season. Okey first received basketball notoriety in Wisconsin while attending a Cassville prep school. He was a McDonald's High School All-American in 1995.

In 2006, the City of La Crosse dedicated a time capsule which included objects from the city's 150-year history. Buried under a marble slab, the capsule is set to be opened for the city's bicentennial celebration in 2056. A Bobcats pin-back button and program from their inaugural season were included in the capsule.

== All-time roster ==
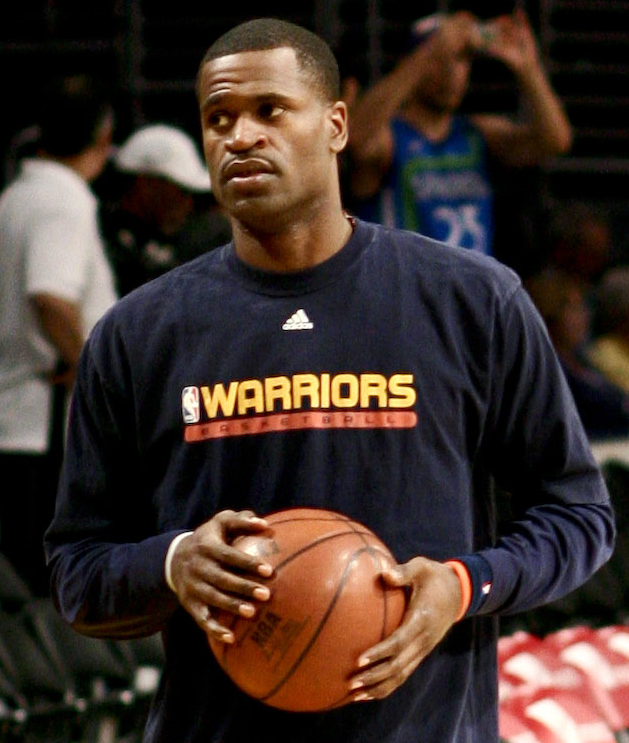
Stephen Jackson played for the Bobcats in 1997 and 1998.

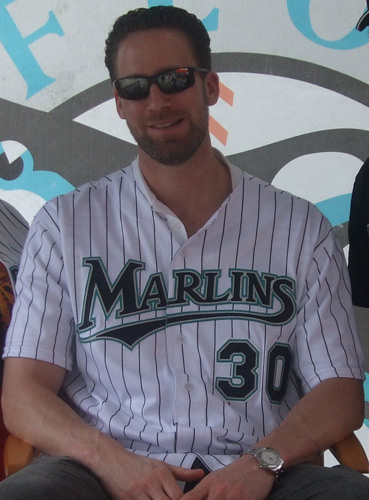
Mark Hendrickson had three separate stints with La Crosse (1997, 1999 and 2000).

- Chucky Atkins
- A. J. Bramlett
- James Blackwell
- Mark Blount
- Gerald Brown
- Walter Bond
- David Booth
- Lazaro Borrell
- Mark Boyd
- Jon Bryant
- Adrian Caldwell
- Jerry Carstensen
- Robert Churchwell
- James Collins
- Joe Courtney
- Corey Crowder
- Jason Crowe
- Dennis Davis
- Mark Davis
- Todd Day
- Tony Dumas
- Nate Driggers
- LaZelle Durden
- Acie Earl
- Neil Edwards
- Jo Jo English
- Sharif Fajardo
- Rob Feaster
- Isaac Fontaine
- Casey Frank
- Ronnie Fields
- Matt Fish
- Sherell Ford
- Ruben Garces
- Tim Gill
- Omm'A Givens
- Ronnie Grandison
- Jermaine Guice
- Jack Haley
- Emmett Hall
- Vince Hamilton
- Phil Handy
- Steve Hart
- Mark Hendrickson
- Fred Herzog
- Andrell Hoard
- Reggie Jackson
- Stephen Jackson
- Keith Johnson
- Danny Jones
- Dontae' Jones
- Tim Kempton
- Bo Kimble
- Chris King
- Jimmy King
- Kirk King
- Chris Kingsbury
- Jarvis Lang
- Doug Lee
- Martin Lewis
- Jarrod Lovette
- Marcus Mann
- Erik Martin
- Sean Mason
- Clint McDaniel
- Julius Michalik
- Russ Millard
- Silas Mills
- Jason Miskiri
- Tracy Moore
- Lawrence Moten
- Terquin Mott
- Ruben Nembhard
- Melvin Newbern
- Ed O'Bannon
- Sam Okey
- Derrick Phelps
- Rob Phelps
- Mark Pope
- Virginijus Praškevičius
- Mark Randall
- Mike Richardson
- Chris Robinson
- Rumeal Robinson
- Stan Rose
- Yamen Sanders
- Mark Sanford
- Reggie Slater
- Charles Smith
- Chris Smith
- Edward Smith
- Andre Spencer
- Joe Stephens
- Ray Thompson
- Keith Tower
- Anthony Tucker
- Donald Watts
- Jermaine Walker
- Bubba Wells
- Donald Whiteside
- Brandon Williams
- Trevor Winter

== Season-by-season records ==
Season	GP	W	L	Pct.	Head coach(s)	Ref
1996–97	56	19	37	.339	Don Zierden	
1997–98	56	25	31	.446	Don Zierden	
1998–99	56	21	35	.375	Don Zierden (3–1); Mike Mashak (18–34)	
1999–2000	56	21	35	.375	Dennis Johnson (14–22); Bill Klucas (7–13)	
2000–01	23	9	14	.391	Bill Klucas	
Totals	247	95	152	.385		
