= Pavel Podkolzin =

Russian basketball player (born 1985)

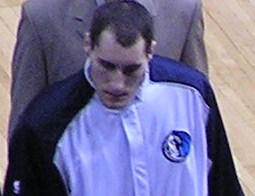
- Podkolzin with the Mavericks in 2005

Personal information
- Born: 15 January 1985 (age 41) Novosibirsk, Russian SFSR, Soviet Union
- Listed height: 7 ft 5 in (2.26 m)
- Listed weight: 305 lb (138 kg)

Career information
- NBA draft: 2004: 1st round, 21st overall pick
- Drafted by: Utah Jazz
- Playing career: 2001–2019
- Position: Center
- Number: 24

Career history
- 2001: Sibirtelecom Lokomotiv
- 2002–2004: Metis Varese
- 2004–2006: Dallas Mavericks
- 2006: →Fort Worth Flyers
- 2006–2007: Khimki
- 2007–2010: Sibirtelecom Lokomotiv
- 2010–2011: Metallurg Magnitogorsk
- 2011–2014: Sibirtelecom Lokomotiv
- 2014: Altai Basket
- 2014–2016: Sibirtelecom Lokomotiv
- 2016–2017: PSK Sakhalin
- 2018–2019: Universitet Yugra Surgut
- Stats at NBA.com
- Stats at Basketball Reference

Other information
Association football career
- Position: Forward
Team information
- Current team: Amkal Moscow
- Number: 54
Senior career*
Years	Team	Apps	(Gls)
2025–	Amkal Moscow		
- * Club domestic league appearances and goals as of 19 August 2025

Pavel Nikolaevitch Podkolzin (Russian: Павел Николаевич Подкользин; born 15 January 1985) is a Russian footballer and former professional basketball player who played in the National Basketball Association (NBA). He was a 2.26 m (7 ft 5 in) tall center.

== Basketball career ==
=== Professional career ===
Podkolzin made his debut with Lokomotiv Novosibirsk, in the Russian second division, during the 2001–02 season. In December 2001, he signed with Italy's Metis Varese, for whom he played from 2002 to 2004. He was selected by the Utah Jazz in the 2004 NBA draft and promptly traded to the Dallas Mavericks for a future first-round pick in the 2005 NBA draft. He was originally available for selection in the previous year's draft, but withdrew due to acromegaly, a pituitary disorder. Podkolzin was considered to be a high draft pick in the 2004 draft because of his size, blocking ability and strength, but he was chosen late in the draft. Podkolzin averaged 6.0 rebounds in 14.0 minutes in his first two Las Vegas Summer League Revue games. On 5 August 2006, he was waived by the Mavericks after appearing briefly in just six games spanning two seasons.

In 2006–07, he played in the Russian Super League for Khimki BC and former team Lokomotiv Novosibirsk.

=== National team career ===
Podkolzin was a member of the junior Russian national basketball team that won the silver medal at the 2000 European Cadets Championship.

== Football career ==
On 19 August 2025, Podkolzin played his first professional football match, starting for Amkal Moscow against Kaluga in Round 2 of the 2025–26 Russian Cup. He became the tallest player in the history of the Russian football. He played 19 minutes before being substituted. Amkal Moscow won 1–0 and advanced to the 2025–26 Russian Cup Round 3.

== Filmography ==
- 1703 TV series (2022). Sasha "Edinorog" (Alexander)
