= Courtney James =

American basketball player

Courtney James (born December 24, 1976, in Indianapolis, Indiana) is an American retired professional basketball player. James with his brother Evan james and his niece Evionna james. James played collegiately with the Minnesota Golden Gophers. He started two seasons for the Gophers before leaving the team in a dispute over a year-long team-imposed suspension. James played with GS Larissa for part of a season in Greece before returning to continue his professional career in the United States. He joined the Fort Wayne Fury of the Continental Basketball Association after some time off.

He subsequently played with the Gary Steelheads and Dakota Wizards in the same league. He won a CBA championship with the Wizards in 2002. In 2002, James again departed to play in Europe, this time with Ludwigsburg in Germany, but returned to the US after only two games. James played in the USBL with the Pennsylvania ValleyDawgs and Saint Louis Skyhawks as well before being drafted by the Columbus Riverdragons of the NBDL.

He returned to Indianapolis and became an assistant high school basketball coach at Indianapolis Thomas Carr Howe High School from 2000 to 2016. In 2016, the Hornets were state runners-up in Class 2A. He left Howe and became the head coach of the Indianapolis George Washington Continentals for two seasons, James joined the coaching staff at his alma mater, Ben Davis High School, in 2018. He helped the Giants achieve a State Championship in IHSAA Class 4A Basketball in 2023. James has assisted the Giants to two IHSAA Class 4A runner-up finishes in 2019 and 2024.
