= American Basketball Association (2000–present) standings =

These are regular season standings for the current incarnation of the American Basketball Association (ABA).

Note: The ABA does not keep official records for team standings. These records were all taken from www.USBasket.com.

== 2000-2001 ==
2000-01 ABA season

East	W	L	Win %
Detroit Dogs	24	20	.545
Memphis Houn'Dawgs	19	22	.463
Indiana Legends	18	24	.429
Tampa Bay ThunderDawgs	15	26	.366
West	W	L	Win %
Chicago Skyliners	31	12	.721
Los Angeles Stars	28	13	.683
Kansas City Knights	24	17	.585
San Diego Wildfire	8	33	.195

== 2001-2002 ==
2001-02 ABA season

Team	W	L	Win %
Kansas City Knights	35	5	.865
Southern California Surf	23	14	.622
Phoenix Eclipse	19	15	.559
Detroit Dogs	11	17	.393
Kentucky Pro Cats	12	21	.363
Indiana Legends	10	22	.313
Las Vegas Slam	7	20	.259

== 2002-2003 ==
No Season

== 2003-2004 ==
2003-04 ABA season

Team	W	L	Win %
Long Beach Jam	24	7	.774
Kansas City Knights	23	9	.719
Juarez Gallos	18	12	.600
Fresno Heatwave	13	16	.448
Tijuana Dragons	12	18	.400
Las Vegas Rattlers	10	18	.357
Jersey Squires	3	23	.115

== 2004-2005 ==
See 2004-05 ABA season

== 2005-2006 ==
See 2005-06 ABA season

== 2006-2007 ==
See 2006–07 ABA season

== 2007-2008 ==
See 2007–08 ABA season

== 2008-2009 ==
See 2008–09 ABA season

== 2009-2010 ==
See 2009–10 ABA season

== 2010-2011 ==
See 2010–11 ABA season

== 2011-2012 ==
See 2011-12 ABA season

== 2012-2013 ==
See 2012-13 ABA season

== 2013-2014 ==
See 2013-14 ABA season

== 2014-2015 ==
See 2014-15 ABA season
