= Earl Cureton =

American basketball player (1957–2024)

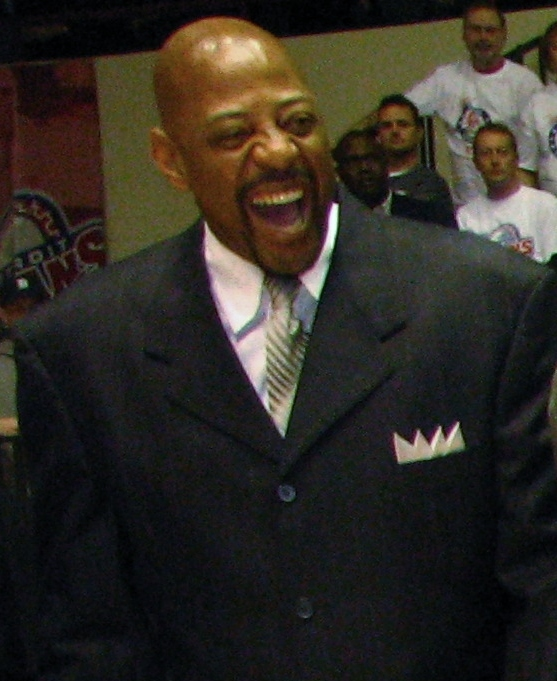
- Cureton in 2011

Personal information
- Born: September 3, 1957 Detroit, Michigan, U.S.
- Died: February 4, 2024 (aged 66) Detroit, Michigan, U.S.
- Listed height: 6 ft 9 in (2.06 m)
- Listed weight: 210 lb (95 kg)

Career information
- High school: Finney (Detroit, Michigan)
- College: Robert Morris (1975–1977); Detroit Mercy (1978–1980)
- NBA draft: 1979: 3rd round, 58th overall pick
- Drafted by: Philadelphia 76ers
- Playing career: 1980–1997
- Position: Power forward / center
- Number: 25, 23, 35
- Coaching career: 2000–2013

Career history

Playing
- 1980–1983: Philadelphia 76ers
- 1983: Scavolini Pesaro
- 1983: Simac Milano
- 1983–1986: Detroit Pistons
- 1986–1987: Chicago Bulls
- 1987–1988: Los Angeles Clippers
- 1988–1989: Charlotte Hornets
- 1989–1990: Philips Milano
- 1991: Charlotte Hornets
- 1991: New Haven Skyhawks
- 1991–1992: Tours B.C.
- 1994: Sioux Falls Skyforce
- 1994: Houston Rockets
- 1996–1997: Toronto Raptors

Coaching
- 2000–2001: Los Angeles Stars (assistant)
- 2001–2002: Southern California Surf (assistant)
- 2003: Long Beach Jam (assistant)
- 2003–2004: Long Beach Jam
- 2004–2005: Orange County Crush
- 2005–2006: Charlotte Sting (assistant)
- 2012–2013: Phoenix Mercury (assistant)

Career highlights
- As player: 2× NBA champion (1983, 1994); No. 24 retired by Detroit Mercy Titans; As coach: ABA champion (2004); ABA Coach of the Year (2004)

Career NBA statistics
- Points: 3,620 (5.4 ppg)
- Rebounds: 3,172 (4.7 rpg)
- Assists: 678 (1.0 apg)
- Stats at NBA.com
- Stats at Basketball Reference

Earl Cureton (September 3, 1957 – February 4, 2024) was an American professional basketball player who played in the National Basketball Association (NBA). Nicknamed "the Twirl", he played college basketball for the Robert Morris Colonials and Detroit Mercy Titans. Cureton was selected by the Philadelphia 76ers in the third round of the 1979 NBA draft. He won an NBA championship with the 76ers and the Houston Rockets, and also played in the NBA for the Detroit Pistons, Chicago Bulls, Los Angeles Clippers, Charlotte Hornets, and Toronto Raptors. He also played in multiple countries overseas.

== Early life ==
Cureton was born in Detroit on September 3, 1957, and grew up in the 1960s in the midst of the city's race riots. He played high school basketball at Finney High School.

== College career ==
Cureton played two seasons at Robert Morris College. After his first year, they transitioned from being a junior college, and he played in the Colonials' first season in NCAA Division I in 1976–77, averaging a double-double of 17.2 points and 10.5 rebounds per game, before electing to return home to play at the University of Detroit Mercy under coach Dick Vitale. Cureton was required by NCAA rules to sit out a year due to the transfer, when Vitale left for the Detroit Pistons and was replaced by Smokey Gaines.

Cureton paired with future NBA player Terry Duerod to lead the Titans to the 1979 NCAA tournament, losing to Lamar 95–87 in the first round. Detroit finished ranked No. 20 on the season. Cureton had a stellar senior season in 1979–80, averaging 19.9 points and 9.1 rebounds, and was inducted into the Detroit Mercy Titans Hall of Fame in 2007. They retired his No. 24 in 2020.

== Professional career ==
The Philadelphia 76ers selected Cureton in the third round of the 1979 NBA draft with the 58th overall pick, when he was still a junior in college. He stayed with Detroit another year before signing with the 76ers in 1980. Philadelphia reached the 1982 NBA Finals, but lost to the Los Angeles Lakers. Led by their newly acquired center Moses Malone, the 76ers won the 1983 finals in a rematch with the Lakers. In game 2 with the 76ers up 1–0 in the series, Cureton filled in for Malone, who was in foul trouble. Cureton made a hook shot over the Lakers' Kareem Abdul-Jabbar, who had made the shot famous, and Philadelphia increased their lead while Cureton was in the game. He played 17 minutes in a 103–93 win, and the 76ers eventually swept the series.

After three seasons with Philadelphia, Cureton failed to agree to a contract with the team. He briefly played in Italy for Scavolini Pesaro and Simac Milano before signing with the Detroit Pistons for the 1983–84 season, and spent three seasons with the Pistons. He became a journeyman for the rest of his career, traded to the Chicago Bulls in 1987, and then playing for the Los Angeles Clippers (1987–88) and Charlotte Hornets (1988–89, 1990–91), with another stint in between in Italy with Philips Milano (1989–90). He also played for the New Haven Skyhawks of the United States Basketball League in 1991, hoping to return to the NBA.

From 1991 to 1993, Cureton played in the LNB Pro A (Tours B.C.) in France, the Venezuelan SuperLiga, and the Liga Nacional de Baloncesto Profesional in Mexico. After not receiving any offers from the NBA or Europe, he joined Magic Johnson and his traveling all-star team. They stopped touring in March 1994, and Cureton joined the Sioux Falls Skyforce of the Continental Basketball Association. Following eight games with the Skyforce, he signed with the Houston Rockets near the end of their 1993–94 season, in time to qualify for their postseason roster. In the playoffs, he filled in for injured forward Carl Herrera, becoming a key rotational player as a backup to Hakeem Olajuwon and Otis Thorpe. The Rockets defeated the New York Knicks to win the 1994 NBA Finals, when Herrera returned and reassumed his role. Houston planned to invite Cureton to their 1994–95 training camp, but he blew out the anterior cruciate ligament of his right knee and was troubled by some nerve damage.

In 1996, Cureton played six months with a Buenos Aires team in Argentina's Liga Nacional de Básquet. At age 39, he finished his career with the Toronto Raptors (1996–97), retiring from playing on February 13, 1997, to become the Raptors' assistant strength and conditioning coach. Cureton played 674 NBA regular games in his career, including 137 starts, averaging 5.4 points and 4.7 rebounds in 18.4 minutes per game. He played in 54 playoff games across seven postseasons, starting in four contests.

== Coaching career ==
Cureton made his coaching debut in the 2000–01 ABA season as an assistant with the Los Angeles Stars. He then served as an assistant with the Southern California Surf in the 2001–02 ABA season.

Cureton started the 2003–04 ABA season as an assistant coach for the Long Beach Jam. He was elevated to head coach in November 2003 and went on to guide the Jam to the ABA championship and was named the ABA Coach of the Year.

For the 2004–05 ABA season, Cureton joined the Orange County Crush as head coach. He parted ways with the team in January 2005 and returned to the Long Beach Jam, where he served as chief of basketball operations for the rest of the season.

Cureton served as an assistant coach of the Charlotte Sting in the Women's National Basketball Association (WNBA) in the 2005 and 2006 WNBA seasons. He returned to the WNBA as an assistant with the Phoenix Mercury in 2012 and 2013.

== Post-playing career ==
In 2011, Cureton fulfilled a promise to his mother, returning to finish his degree at UD. He served as a color analyst for Detroit Mercy Titans on ESPN+ and radio broadcasts, and was also a broadcaster for the Detroit Pistons.

In 2013, Cureton began serving as a Community Ambassador for the Pistons. This role included leading Pistons organizational outreach and community partnerships. He released his autobiography, Earl the Twirl: My Life in Basketball, in 2023, and was also inducted into the American Basketball Hall of Fame in Detroit that year.

Cureton was named the 2024 Michigan Treasure by the Michigan Sports Hall of Fame. Cureton died "suddenly" on February 4, 2024, at the age of 66. He called his last game for the Titans the day before his death.

== Career statistics ==
Legend
GP	Games played	GS	Games started	MPG	Minutes per game
FG%	Field goal percentage	3P%	3-point field goal percentage	FT%	Free throw percentage
RPG	Rebounds per game	APG	Assists per game	SPG	Steals per game
BPG	Blocks per game	PPG	Points per game	**Bold**	Career high
†	Won an NBA championship	*	Led the league

=== NBA ===
==== Regular season ====
Year	Team	GP	GS	MPG	FG%	3P%	FT%	RPG	APG	SPG	BPG	PPG
1980–81	Philadelphia	52	6	10.2	.454	.000	.516	3.0	.5	.4	.4	4.2
1981–82	Philadelphia	66	8	14.5	.487	.000	.543	4.1	.5	.5	.4	5.3
1982–83†	Philadelphia	73	3	13.5	.419	–	.493	3.7	.6	.5	.3	3.4
1983–84	Detroit	73	0	12.4	.458	.000	.525	3.9	.5	.3	.4	2.6
1984–85	Detroit	81	1	20.3	.484	.000	**.569**	5.2	1.0	**.7**	.5	6.1
1985–86	Detroit	80	19	25.2	**.505**	.000	.555	6.3	**1.7**	**.7**	.7	**8.6**
1986–87	Chicago	43	36	**25.7**	.467	.000	.534	5.3	1.6	.3	.6	6.9
1986–87	L.A. Clippers	35	11	24.8	.487	.000	.544	**6.4**	1.5	.5	**.9**	7.7
1987–88	L.A. Clippers	69	11	16.3	.429	.000	.524	3.9	.9	.5	.5	4.3
1988–89	Charlotte	**82***	**41**	25.0	.501	.000	.537	6.0	1.6	.6	.7	6.5
1990–91	Charlotte	9	1	17.7	.333	.000	.333	4.0	.3	.0	.3	1.9
1993–94†	Houston	2	0	15.0	.250	–	.000	6.0	.0	.0	.0	2.0
1996–97	Toronto	9	0	5.1	.375	–	.333	1.0	.4	.0	.0	.8
Career		674	137	18.4	.473	.000	.538	4.7	1.0	.5	.5	5.4

==== Playoffs ====
Year	Team	GP	GS	MPG	FG%	3P%	FT%	RPG	APG	SPG	BPG	PPG
1981	Philadelphia	9		4.0	.333	–	.000	1.0	.2	.1	**.2**	1.3
1982	Philadelphia	**12**		6.3	.317	.000	.667	2.2	.2	.1	.1	2.7
1983†	Philadelphia	5		5.0	.250	–	–	1.0	.2	.4	.0	.4
1984	Detroit	5		18.6	.484	–	.333	6.6	.4	.4	**.2**	6.4
1985	Detroit	9	0	14.8	.471	.000	.556	4.6	.4	**1.0**	**.2**	4.1
1986	Detroit	4	**4**	**31.5**	.548	.000	.250	**7.5**	**2.3**	.8	.0	**9.0**
1994†	Houston	10	0	10.0	**.800**	–	**1.000**	2.9	.2	.1	**.2**	1.8
Career		54	4	10.9	.450	.000	.472	3.2	.4	.4	.1	3.1

== Publications ==
- Cureton, Earl; Uitti, Jake (2023). Earl the Twirl: My Life in Basketball. McFarland. ISBN 978-1476693835.
