= Leisy =

Leisy is an Americanized surname from the Swiss German Leisi.

Notable people with the surname include:

- Jim Leisy (born 1950), American artist, photographer, book editor, and publisher
- Matt Leisy, British-American actor
- Robert Ronald Leisy (1945–1969), United States Army officer
