= Ivana Gavrilović =

Dominican television presenter

- Born: 7 July 1987 (age 39); Socialist Federal Republic of Yugoslavia
- Other name: Ivana Gavrilovich
- Education: Iberoamerican University
- Known for: Radio personality, TV presenter, model

Ivana Gavrilović (Serbian Cyrillic: Ивана Гавриловић, born 7 July 1987) is a Dominican radio and television presenter of Serbian origin.

Gavrilović was born in Yugoslavia; after the Yugoslav Wars her mother decided to take her (at 14 years of age) and relocate to the Dominican Republic.

Graduated in 2008 from clinical psychology at the Iberoamerican University, Gavrilović studied communication in Mexico and in the next year she began her radio programme ″Omelette Radio″.

In 2011, she participated in the Luz García's contest "Cuerpos hot del verano".

== Media ==
Radio

- 2009–2011 – Omelette Radio (La Rocka, 91.7 FM)
- 2011–2014 – Omelette Radio (Latidos, 93.7 FM)
- 2014–2018 – Omelette40, Los 40 Dominican Republic, 103.3 FM)

Television

- 2010–2013 – TeleNoticias (TeleSistema, Channel 11)
- 2009–2010 – Conectados (Telecentro Channel 13 )
- 2017–2018 – Blanca Morena ( Color Visión, Channel 9)
- 2018– 2019 – Blanca Morena Take Miami ( Color Vision, Channel 9)
- 2019–present – Show del Medio Dia (Color Vision, Channel 9)
- 2019–present – Protagonistas con Ivana Gavrilovic ( Color Vision, Channel 9)
