= Matt Barnes =

American basketball player (born 1980)

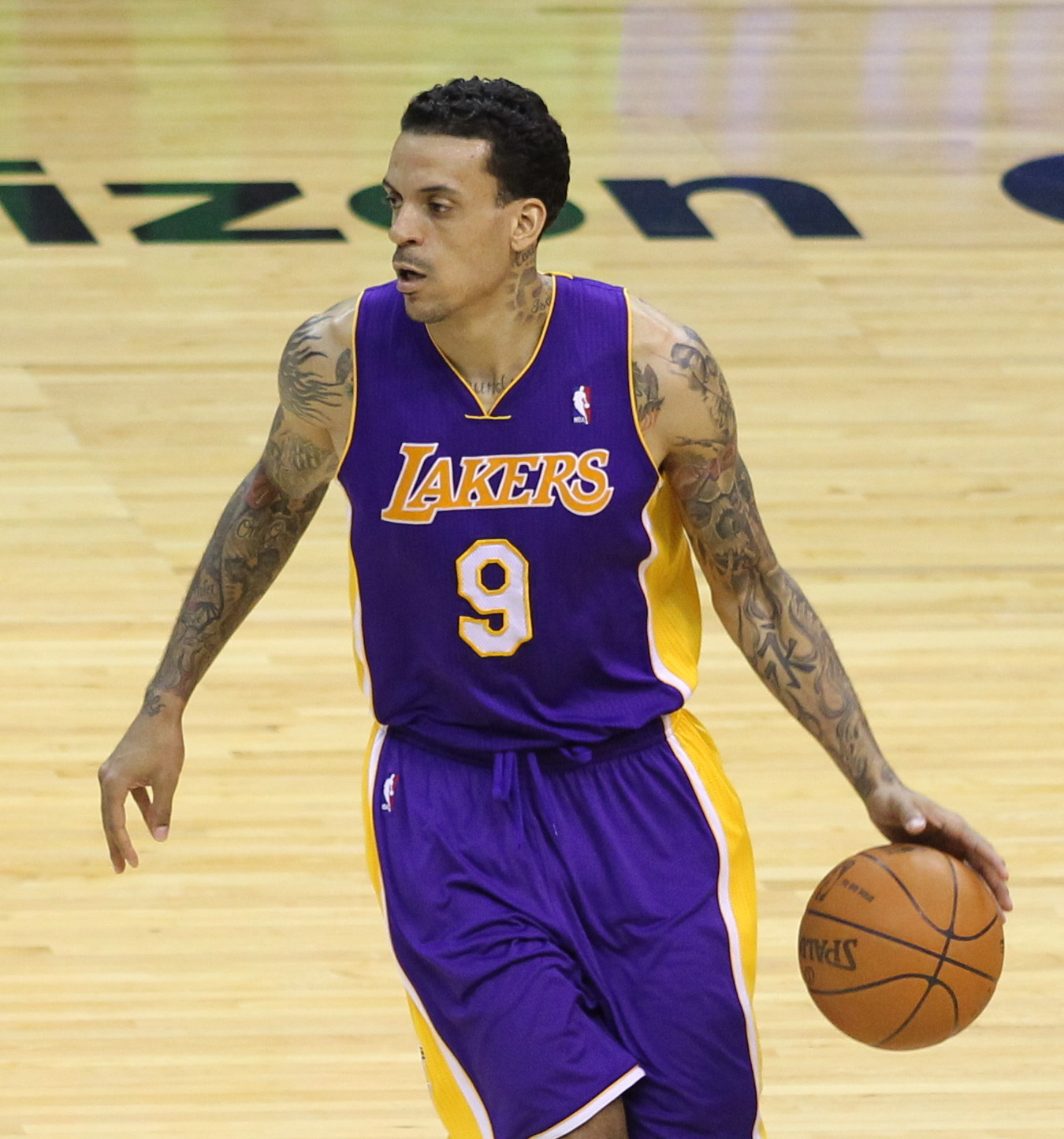
- Barnes with the Los Angeles Lakers in 2012

Personal information
- Born: March 9, 1980 (age 46) Santa Clara, California, U.S.
- Listed height: 6 ft 7 in (2.01 m)
- Listed weight: 226 lb (103 kg)

Career information
- High school: Del Campo (Fair Oaks, California)
- College: UCLA (1998–2002)
- NBA draft: 2002: 2nd round, 46th overall pick
- Drafted by: Memphis Grizzlies
- Playing career: 2002–2017
- Position: Small forward
- Number: 9, 21, 22

Career history
- 2002–2003: Fayetteville Patriots
- 2003–2004: Long Beach Jam
- 2004: Los Angeles Clippers
- 2004–2005: Sacramento Kings
- 2005: New York Knicks
- 2005–2006: Philadelphia 76ers
- 2006–2008: Golden State Warriors
- 2008–2009: Phoenix Suns
- 2009–2010: Orlando Magic
- 2010–2012: Los Angeles Lakers
- 2012–2015: Los Angeles Clippers
- 2015–2016: Memphis Grizzlies
- 2016–2017: Sacramento Kings
- 2017: Golden State Warriors

Career highlights
- NBA champion (2017); ABA champion (2004)

Career statistics
- Points: 7,589 (8.2 ppg)
- Rebounds: 4,281 (4.6 rpg)
- Assists: 1,691 (1.8 apg)
- Stats at NBA.com
- Stats at Basketball Reference

Matthew Kelly Barnes (born March 9, 1980) is an American former professional basketball player who played 14 seasons in the National Basketball Association (NBA). He was drafted in the second round of the 2002 NBA draft by the Memphis Grizzlies and won an NBA championship with the Golden State Warriors in his final season in the league in 2017. Barnes is currently a basketball analyst for ESPN as well as NBC Sports California for Sacramento Kings games, and also hosts a popular podcast.

== Early life ==
Barnes was born in Santa Clara, California, to an Italian mother and an African American father. He attended Del Campo High School in Fair Oaks, California, where he was a letterman in football and basketball. Barnes earned All-American, All-State, All-CIF, All-City, and All-League honors in each sport.

Barnes played four seasons of college basketball at UCLA, where he was an All-Pacific-10 Honorable Mention selection in 2001.

== Professional career ==
=== Fayetteville Patriots (2002–2003) ===
Barnes was selected with the 46th overall pick by the Memphis Grizzlies in the 2002 NBA draft, and was immediately traded, along with Nick Anderson, to the Cleveland Cavaliers for Wesley Person. The Cavaliers assigned Barnes for the NBA D-League, and he joined the Fayetteville Patriots for the 2002–03 season.

=== Long Beach Jam (2003–2004) ===
Barnes signed with the Long Beach Jam of the ABA for their inaugural season in 2003, where he played with Dennis Rodman. The team went 24–7 and won the ABA championship. Barnes averaged 18.9 points and 6.8 rebounds.

=== Los Angeles Clippers (2004) ===
Barnes signed a contract with the Los Angeles Clippers for the second half of the 2003–04 NBA season.

=== Sacramento Kings (2004–2005) ===
In October 2004, Barnes signed with the Sacramento Kings. He made his debut for the Kings recording 17 points and nine rebounds, establishing himself as a key rotation player for Sacramento. Barnes was traded halfway through the 2004–05 season along with Chris Webber to the Philadelphia 76ers, in exchange for Kenny Thomas, Corliss Williamson and Brian Skinner. Barnes did not suit up for Philadelphia that season while recovering from a knee tendinitis, and was given an injury release.

=== New York Knicks (2005) ===
Barnes signed a free agent contract with the New York Knicks in October 2005. Although he appeared to secure a starting job with an impressive preseason and Allan Houston's retirement, Barnes was waived by the Knicks after playing in just six games.

=== Philadelphia 76ers (2005–2006) ===
Barnes was claimed by the 76ers to serve a second stint in Philadelphia, where he finished out the 2005–06 season.

=== Golden State Warriors (2006–2008) ===
Barnes signed with the Golden State Warriors before their first day of training camp in October 2006, and effectively raised his status in the league since joining the team. With struggling forward Mike Dunleavy Jr. placed on the bench, Barnes was given more playing time by coach Don Nelson. On December 26, 2006, Barnes hit seven three-point field goals to tie a Warriors franchise record. The record was broken later that season by Jason Richardson, who hit eight three-pointers on March 29, 2007. Barnes, a high-school All-American wide receiver, says that if he had not been signed by the Warriors he would have tried out for the NFL.

Before signing with Golden State, Barnes had only made 10 three-pointers in his career. In the 2006–07 season, Barnes made 106. After joining Golden State, his offense improved impressively, from 3.0 points a game in Philadelphia to 9.8, appearing in 76 games. Barnes also added a strong 2007 post-season, with 11.1 ppg and 5.7 rpg in eleven playoff games and helped the #8-seed Warriors take down the #1-seed Mavericks in the 2007 playoffs.

On August 6, 2007, Barnes returned to the Warriors under a one-year contract. Barnes, along with teammates Stephen Jackson and Baron Davis, served as a Warriors team captain for the 2007–08 season. He was not expected to return for the 2008–09 season.

=== Phoenix Suns (2008–2009) ===
On July 22, 2008, Barnes signed a one-year contract with the Phoenix Suns. On November 14, he received a two-game suspension for his role in the scuffle with Houston's Rafer Alston two days earlier.

=== Orlando Magic (2009–2010) ===
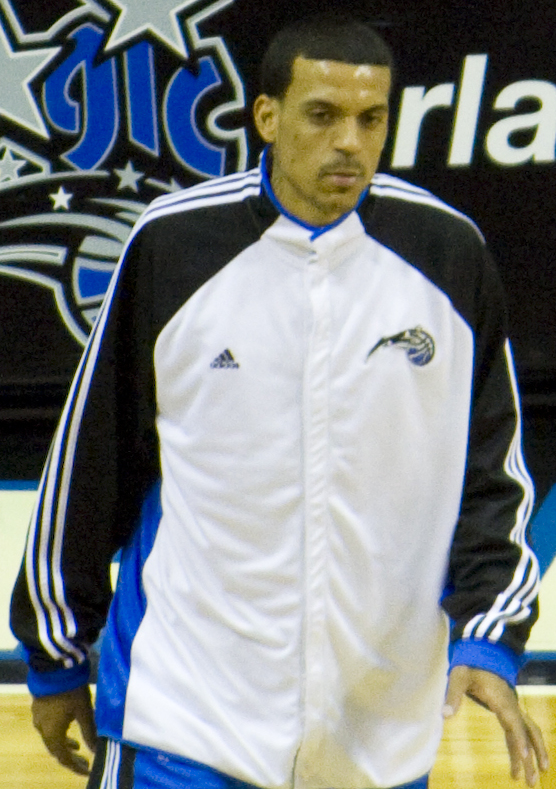
Barnes in 2010

On July 23, 2009, Barnes signed a two-year deal with the Orlando Magic. Although he was able to opt out of his deal after the first year, Barnes stated that he wanted to remain in Orlando. After the Magic were eliminated in the 2010 NBA playoffs by the Boston Celtics, Barnes announced he would opt out of the final year of his contract.

=== Los Angeles Lakers (2010–2012) ===
On July 23, 2010, Barnes signed with the Los Angeles Lakers.

=== Return to the Clippers (2012–2015) ===
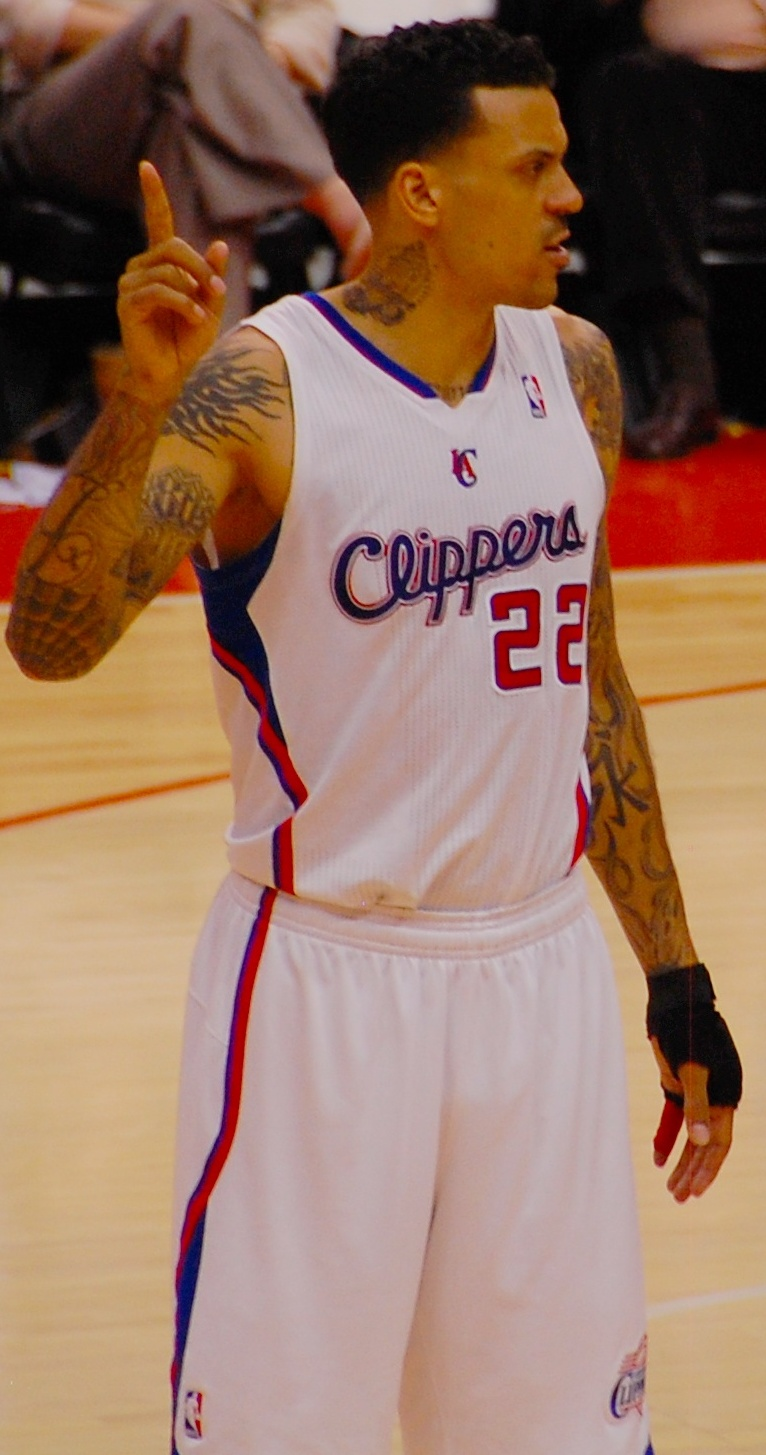
Barnes in 2013

Barnes signed with the Los Angeles Clippers in September 2012. On October 31, 2012, he was suspended for one game after he pleaded no contest to a misdemeanor for resisting, delaying, or obstructing a police officer. In June 2013, Barnes was named Defensive Player of the Year for the Clippers.

On July 10, 2013, Barnes re-signed with the Clippers to a multi-year deal. In November 2013, Barnes was fined $25,000 for not leaving the court in a timely manner after an ejection in a game against the Oklahoma City Thunder and for using his Twitter account during the game in violation of the NBA's rules.

During the 2014–15 season, Barnes was fined multiple times. On December 13, he was fined $25,000 for kicking a water bottle and using language during a game against the Washington Wizards. On January 25, 2015, Barnes was fined $25,000 for what was said to be inappropriate language directed towards a fan during a game against the Phoenix Suns, although Barnes said that it was directed towards the Suns' owner. On May 8, he was fined $50,000 for remarks made to James Harden's mother during a playoff game against the Houston Rockets.

=== Memphis Grizzlies (2015–2016) ===
On June 15, 2015, Barnes was traded, along with Spencer Hawes, to the Charlotte Hornets in exchange for shooting guard Lance Stephenson. Ten days later, Barnes was traded again, this time to the Memphis Grizzlies in exchange for Luke Ridnour. The move reunited Barnes with the team that originally drafted him in 2002.

On December 28, 2015, Barnes was suspended by the NBA for two games for a physical altercation with New York Knicks coach Derek Fisher at the home of Barnes' estranged wife in Southern California in October. On January 13, 2016, the NBA Players Association filed a grievance on behalf of Barnes to get his two-game suspension without pay rescinded. Four days later, Barnes was fined $35,000 by the NBA for publicly defending his violence towards Fisher in their October scuffle. On February 24, he scored a season-high 25 points during a 128–119 victory over the Los Angeles Lakers. On March 11, Barnes recorded his first career triple-double with 26 points, 11 rebounds, and 10 assists in a 121–114 overtime victory over the New Orleans Pelicans.

=== Return to Sacramento (2016–2017) ===
On July 9, 2016, Barnes signed with his hometown team, the Sacramento Kings. On February 20, 2017, he was waived to make room for the three players the Kings acquired in the DeMarcus Cousins trade.

=== Return to Golden State (2017) ===
On March 2, 2017, Barnes signed with the Golden State Warriors. The Warriors' starting forward, Kevin Durant, went down with an MCL injury, which left the team in need of a replacement forward. Barnes started in five games out of his 20 games played with the Warriors in the regular season. The Warriors won the 2017 NBA Finals after defeating the Cleveland Cavaliers in five games, giving Barnes his lone championship ring after 14 seasons in the NBA and 16 years in professional basketball. The Warriors finished the playoffs with a 16–1 record, the best postseason winning percentage in NBA history.

=== Retirement ===
On December 11, 2017, Barnes announced his retirement from the NBA via a post on Instagram.

== Podcasting career ==
Barnes co-hosts the digital video podcast All the Smoke with Matt Barnes and Stephen Jackson.

== Personal life ==
Barnes' younger brother, Jason, played football in the Canadian Football League.

Barnes was married to Gloria Govan, who appeared in VH1's Basketball Wives and Basketball Wives: LA, and they have identical twin boys. Barnes was arrested in 2010 on suspicion of domestic violence against Govan, and for driving with a suspended license and threatening a police officer in July 2012. They separated in 2014. Barnes was charged with assault on February 1, 2017 after he allegedly choked a woman and struck her boyfriend.

His wife, Anansa Sims, is the daughter of model Beverly Johnson. Sims and Barnes have two children together. Barnes and Sims married in 2026.

== Career statistics ==
Legend
GP	Games played	GS	Games started	MPG	Minutes per game
FG%	Field goal percentage	3P%	3-point field goal percentage	FT%	Free throw percentage
RPG	Rebounds per game	APG	Assists per game	SPG	Steals per game
BPG	Blocks per game	PPG	Points per game	**Bold**	Career high
†	Won an NBA championship

=== NBA ===
==== Regular season ====
Year	Team	GP	GS	MPG	FG%	3P%	FT%	RPG	APG	SPG	BPG	PPG
2003–04	L.A. Clippers	38	9	19.1	.457	.154	.705	4.0	1.3	.7	.1	4.5
2004–05	Sacramento	43	9	16.6	.411	.227	.603	3.1	1.3	.7	.2	3.8
2005–06	New York	6	5	15.5	.367	.250	.750	4.0	1.0	.7	.0	4.3
2005–06	Philadelphia	50	0	10.8	**.536**	.182	.674	1.9	.4	.3	.1	3.0
2006–07	Golden State	76	23	23.9	.438	**.366**	.732	4.6	2.1	**1.0**	.5	9.8
2007–08	Golden State	73	18	19.4	.423	.293	.747	4.4	1.9	.7	.5	6.7
2008–09	Phoenix	77	40	27.0	.423	.343	.743	**5.5**	**2.8**	.7	.3	10.2
2009–10	Orlando	**81**	58	25.9	.487	.319	.740	**5.5**	1.7	.7	.4	8.8
2010–11	L.A. Lakers	53	0	19.2	.470	.318	.779	4.3	1.3	.7	.4	6.7
2011–12	L.A. Lakers	63	16	22.9	.452	.333	.742	**5.5**	2.0	.6	**.8**	7.8
2012–13	L.A. Clippers	80	4	25.7	.462	.342	.744	4.6	1.5	**1.0**	**.8**	**10.3**
2013–14	L.A. Clippers	63	40	27.5	.438	.343	.733	4.6	2.0	.9	.4	9.9
2014–15	L.A. Clippers	76	**74**	**29.9**	.444	.362	.779	4.0	1.5	.9	.7	10.1
2015–16	Memphis	76	45	28.8	.381	.322	.804	**5.5**	2.1	**1.0**	**.8**	10.0
2016–17	Sacramento	54	13	25.3	.384	.327	.758	**5.5**	2.8	.7	.3	7.6
2016–17†	Golden State	20	5	20.5	.422	.346	**.870**	4.6	2.3	.6	.5	5.7
Career		929	359	23.6	.436	.335	.745	4.6	1.8	.8	.5	8.2

==== Playoffs ====
Year	Team	GP	GS	MPG	FG%	3P%	FT%	RPG	APG	SPG	BPG	PPG
2007	Golden State	11	3	30.0	.450	**.422**	.722	5.7	2.4	**1.5**	.4	11.1
2010	Orlando	**14**	**14**	23.3	.400	.375	**.850**	4.7	1.4	.7	.2	6.4
2011	L.A. Lakers	10	0	13.1	.395	.167	.571	2.8	.5	.7	.2	3.6
2012	L.A. Lakers	11	0	16.8	.271	.161	.500	3.3	1.5	.9	.5	3.5
2013	L.A. Clippers	6	0	27.0	**.545**	.412	.842	5.0	.5	.7	.3	**11.8**
2014	L.A. Clippers	13	13	31.1	.421	.317	.684	4.5	1.8	.9	.2	9.4
2015	L.A. Clippers	**14**	**14**	29.2	.380	.267	.750	5.1	1.6	1.4	**.7**	7.6
2016	Memphis	4	4	**34.8**	.348	.167	.800	**7.3**	**2.8**	1.0	.3	10.8
2017†	Golden State	12	0	5.1	.267	.125	.000	.8	.6	.2	.0	.8
Career		95	48	22.6	.399	.297	.752	4.1	1.4	.9	.3	6.7

=== College ===
Year	Team	GP	GS	MPG	FG%	3P%	FT%	RPG	APG	SPG	BPG	PPG
1998–99	UCLA	30	8	13.1	.434	.294	.478	2.9	0.8	0.3	0.2	3.9
1999-00	UCLA	28	1	14.8	.471	.156	.488	2.6	1.0	0.7	0.4	5.6
2000–01	UCLA	32	26	30.3	.478	.120	.574	7.3	2.7	1.6	0.6	11.6
2001–02	UCLA	31	31	30.7	.471	.417	.619	6.2	3.5	1.1	0.3	13.5
Career		121	66	22.6	.469	.314	.566	4.8	2.0	1.0	0.4	8.8
