= Scott Brooks =

American basketball coach & player (born 1965)

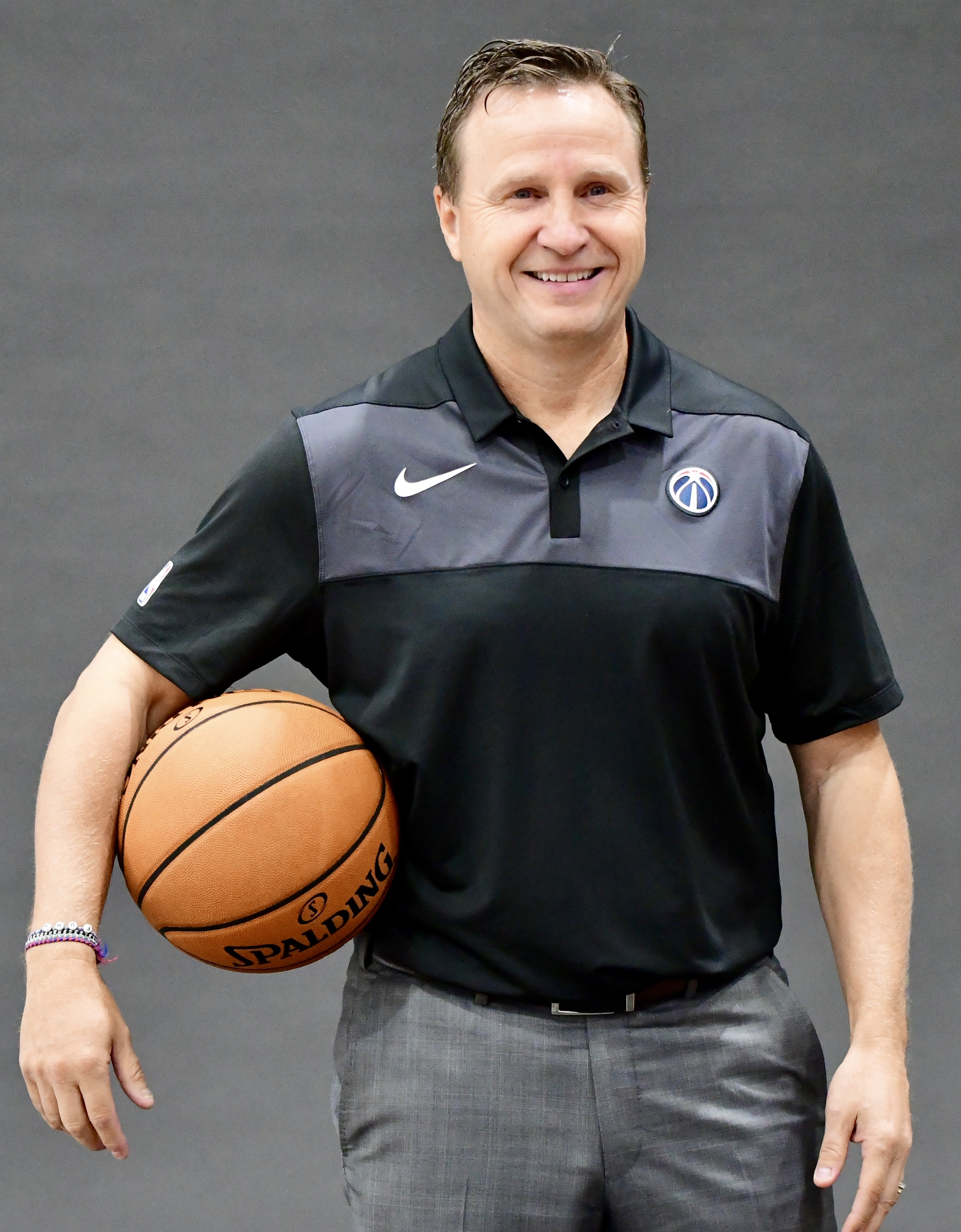
- Brooks with the Washington Wizards in 2019

Los Angeles Lakers
- Title: Assistant coach
- League: NBA

Personal information
- Born: July 31, 1965 (age 61) French Camp, California, U.S.
- Listed height: 5 ft 11 in (1.80 m)
- Listed weight: 180 lb (82 kg)

Career information
- High school: East Union (Manteca, California)
- College: TCU (1983–1984); San Joaquin Delta (1984–1985); UC Irvine (1985–1987)
- NBA draft: 1987: undrafted
- Playing career: 1987–2001
- Position: Point guard
- Number: 1, 4, 2
- Coaching career: 2000–present

Career history

Playing
- 1987–1988: Albany Patroons
- 1988: Fresno Flames
- 1988–1990: Philadelphia 76ers
- 1990–1992: Minnesota Timberwolves
- 1992–1995: Houston Rockets
- 1995–1996: Dallas Mavericks
- 1996–1997: New York Knicks
- 1997–1998: Cleveland Cavaliers
- 2000–2001: Los Angeles Stars

Coaching
- 2000–2001: Los Angeles Stars (assistant)
- 2001–2002: Southern California Surf
- 2003–2006: Denver Nuggets (assistant)
- 2006–2007: Sacramento Kings (assistant)
- 2007–2008: Seattle SuperSonics/Oklahoma City Thunder (assistant)
- 2008–2015: Oklahoma City Thunder
- 2016–2021: Washington Wizards
- 2021–2024: Portland Trail Blazers (assistant)
- 2024–present: Los Angeles Lakers (assistant)

Career highlights
- As player: NBA champion (1994); CBA champion (1988); CBA All-Rookie Team (1988); First-team All-PCAA (1987); No. 12 retired by UC Irvine Anteaters; As coach: NBA Coach of the Year Award (2010); 2× NBA All-Star Game head coach (2012, 2014)

Career NBA statistics
- Points: 3,317 (4.9 ppg)
- Rebounds: 685 (1.0 rpg)
- Assists: 1,608 (2.4 apg)
- Stats at NBA.com
- Stats at Basketball Reference

Scott William Brooks (born July 31, 1965) is an American professional basketball coach and former player who is an assistant coach for the Los Angeles Lakers of the National Basketball Association (NBA). As a player, he won an NBA championship with the Houston Rockets in 1994.

Brooks played point guard at San Joaquin Delta College and Texas Christian University before playing his last two years at the University of California, Irvine. He was inducted into UCI's Hall of Fame in 2001.

== Early life and college ==
Born in French Camp, California on July 31, 1965, Brooks graduated from East Union High School at Manteca, California in 1983. As a freshman, he played college basketball at Texas Christian University for a season and then transferred for his sophomore year to San Joaquin Delta College in Stockton, California, about 10 miles from his parents' home in Lathrop, California. One highlight of his year at TCU was being assigned the task of "fronting" Hakeem Olajuwon. After only being offered a walk-on spot by nearby University of the Pacific, he declined that offer and spent the next two years at the University of California, Irvine. In his senior season at UCI, he averaged 23.8 points and made 43.2% of his three-point attempts. On the night that the Bren Events Center opened at UC Irvine on January 8, 1987, Brooks scored 43 points as UCI defeated Utah State, 118–96. He scored 41 points in a 90–79 win at University of the Pacific later that season to tie the Spanos Center scoring record. Brooks was inducted to the UC Irvine Hall of Fame in 2001 and had his jersey No. 12 retired on November 30, 2019.

== Professional career ==
=== Playing and early coaching career ===
After not being drafted in the 1987 NBA draft, Brooks debuted professionally with the Albany Patroons of the Continental Basketball Association under coach Bill Musselman. Brooks was named to the CBA's all-rookie team in 1988 and was a member of Albany's CBA Championship team that same season. Later, he played for the Fresno Flames of the World Basketball League.

Brooks played 10 seasons (1988–1998) in the NBA, appearing as a member of the Philadelphia 76ers, Minnesota Timberwolves, Houston Rockets, Dallas Mavericks, New York Knicks and Cleveland Cavaliers, and was a member of Houston's 1994 NBA Championship team. In 1995, he was traded to the Mavericks for Morlon Wiley and a second-round pick in the only trade deadline deal of the season. Brooks signed with the Los Angeles Clippers before the 1998–99 season but sat out due to a right knee injury. The Clippers waived Brooks on February 19, 1999, re-signed him, then released Brooks in October 1999, during the 1999–2000 preseason.

== Coaching career ==
Brooks joined the Los Angeles Stars of the American Basketball Association (ABA) in 2000–01, where he was both a player and an assistant coach.

=== Seattle SuperSonics / Oklahoma City Thunder (2007–2015) ===
After serving as an assistant coach with the Sacramento Kings and Denver Nuggets, Brooks was named an assistant to P. J. Carlesimo with the Seattle SuperSonics before the 2007–08 season, and followed the team to Oklahoma City as the Thunder after that season. When Carlesimo was fired on November 22, 2008; Brooks was named interim coach for the rest of the season. On April 22, 2009, the Thunder named him the 15th head coach in the Sonics/Thunder history.

Brooks got off to one of the best starts for a rookie head coach in recent NBA history. He led the Thunder to the playoffs in his first five full seasons with the team. He was named the 2009–10 NBA Coach of the Year after leading the Thunder to a 50-win season and the 8th seed in the Western Conference for the playoffs, a 28-win increase over the previous season. On February 11, 2012, Brooks was named the Western Conference All-Star Coach for the 2012 NBA All-Star Game in Orlando, Florida. In the shortened 66-game 2011–12 season, he led the Thunder to the NBA Finals, where they eventually lost to the 2012 NBA Champions, the Miami Heat. In the 2012 offseason, the Thunder signed Brooks to a multi-year head coaching contract reportedly worth about $18 million.

On January 29, 2014, Brooks was named the Western Conference All-Star Coach for the 2014 NBA All-Star Game in New Orleans.

On April 22, 2015, Brooks was fired by the Thunder a week after the team missed the playoffs for the first time in his six full seasons as head coach. He left as the coach with the third-most wins in the Sonics/Thunder history, behind only Lenny Wilkens and George Karl.

It was reported by Adrian Wojnarowski in May that Brooks did not wish to interview for other coaching opportunities for the 2015–16 season, instead desiring to take a break and reconnect with family living in California.

=== Washington Wizards (2016–2021) ===
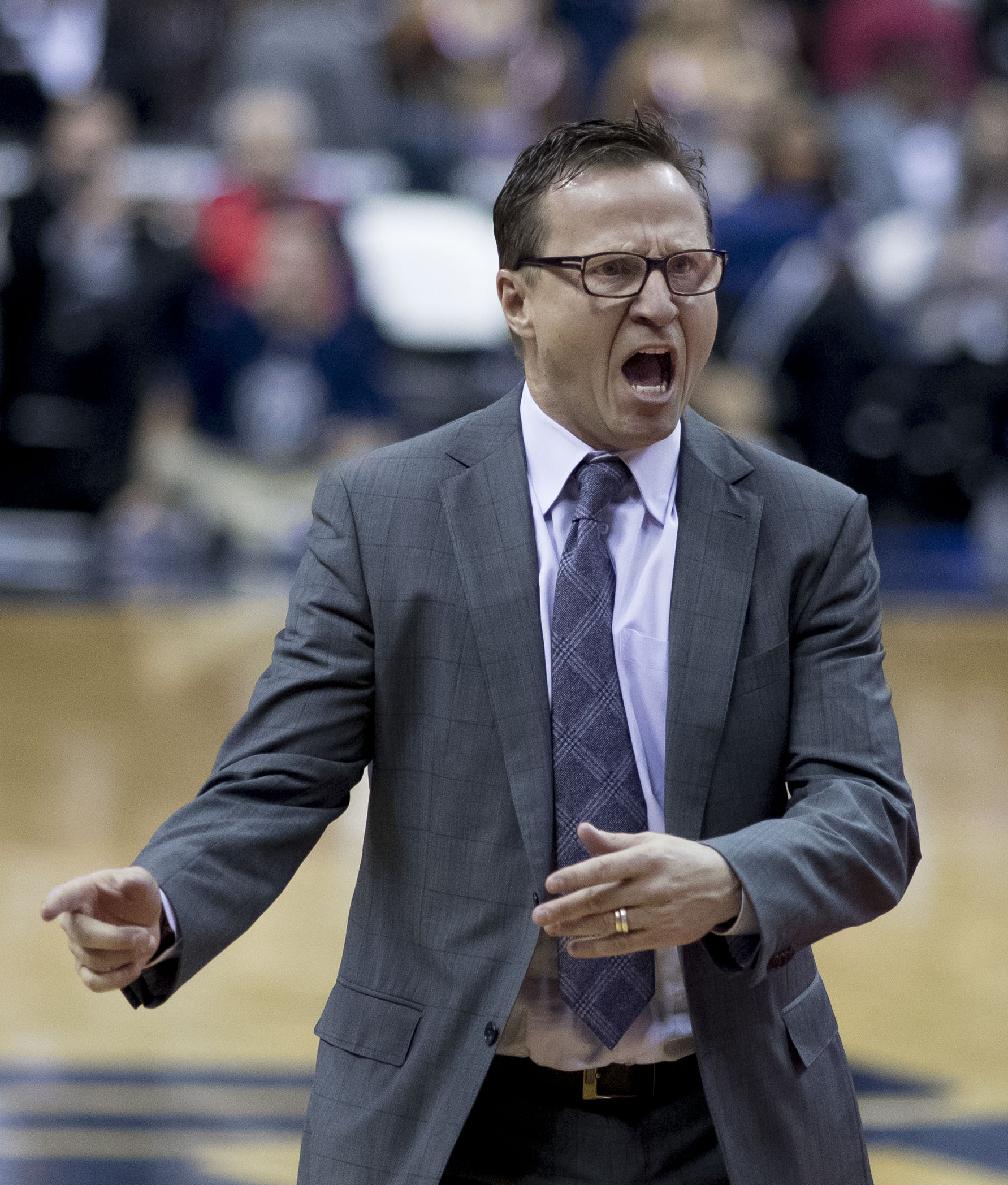
Brooks coaching the Wizards in December 2016

On April 26, 2016, Brooks was hired by the Washington Wizards, becoming the 24th head coach in franchise history.

He altered the team's culture in the off-season and met with several players. In their first season with Brooks at the helm, the Wizards made it to the NBA playoffs, beating the Atlanta Hawks in the first round, before losing in seven games to the Boston Celtics in the second round. While they also made the playoffs the next year, Washington lost in six games in the first round to the Toronto Raptors, and then missed the playoffs entirely the next two seasons. In Brooks's fifth year as head coach, the team made it to the playoffs as a play-in team, but suffered a first round exit to the Philadelphia 76ers.

On June 16, 2021, the Wizards and Brooks parted ways after his contract expired.

=== Portland Trail Blazers (2021–2024) ===
On August 2, 2021, Brooks was hired by the Portland Trail Blazers as the assistant coach to Chauncey Billups.

=== Los Angeles Lakers (2024–present) ===
On August 5, 2024, Brooks joined the Los Angeles Lakers coaching staff as an assistant coach for head coach JJ Redick.

== Personal life ==
Brooks and his wife have two children. His daughter, Lexi, was born without a left hand. Brooks wears three woven bracelets on his right wrist to symbolise his family.

== Career playing statistics ==
Legend
GP	Games played	GS	Games started	MPG	Minutes per game
FG%	Field goal percentage	3P%	3-point field goal percentage	FT%	Free throw percentage
RPG	Rebounds per game	APG	Assists per game	SPG	Steals per game
BPG	Blocks per game	PPG	Points per game	**Bold**	Career high
†	Won an NBA championship	*	Led the league

=== NBA ===
==== Regular season ====
Year	Team	GP	GS	MPG	FG%	3P%	FT%	RPG	APG	SPG	BPG	PPG
1988–89	Philadelphia	**82***	**6**	16.7	.420	.339	.884	1.1	**3.7**	.8	.0	5.2
1989–90	Philadelphia	72	1	13.5	.431	.392	.877	.9	2.9	.7	.0	4.4
1990–91	Minnesota	80	0	12.3	.430	.333	.847	.9	2.6	.7	**.1**	5.3
1991–92	Minnesota	**82**	0	13.2	.447	.356	.810	1.2	2.5	.8	**.1**	5.1
1992–93	Houston	**82**	0	18.5	.475	.414	.830	1.2	3.0	**1.0**	.0	6.3
1993–94†	Houston	73	0	16.8	.491	.377	.871	1.4	2.0	.7	.0	5.2
1994–95	Houston	28	0	6.6	**.538**	**.471**	.857	.5	.8	.3	.0	3.4
1994–95	Dallas	31	0	**20.1**	.433	.327	.793	**1.7**	3.0	.8	**.1**	**7.9**
1995–96	Dallas	69	0	10.4	.457	.403	.855	.6	1.4	.6	.0	5.1
1996–97	New York	38	0	6.6	.487	.417	**.933**	.5	.8	.6	.0	1.5
1997–98	Cleveland	43	0	7.3	.424	.455	.900	.7	1.1	.4	**.1**	1.8
Career		680	7	13.6	.450	.372	.849	1.0	2.4	.7	.0	4.9

==== Playoffs ====
Year	Team	GP	GS	MPG	FG%	3P%	FT%	RPG	APG	SPG	BPG	PPG
1989	Philadelphia	3	0	7.0	.167	.500	**1.000**	**1.3**	1.7	.0	.0	1.7
1990	Philadelphia	9	0	11.0	.316	.429	.667	.9	1.8	.3	.0	2.3
1993	Houston	**12**	0	**16.4**	.381	.385	.769	.8	**2.6**	**.8**	.0	**3.9**
1994†	Houston	5	0	4.6	**.833**	**1.000**	.000	.4	.6	.0	.0	2.2
1997	New York	4	0	1.8	.500	–	**1.000**	.0	.0	.0	.0	.8
1998	Cleveland	1	0	8.0	.000	–	**1.000**	.0	2.0	.0	.0	2.0
Career		34	0	10.4	.382	.435	.750	.7	1.7	.4	.0	2.6

== Head coaching record ==
Legend
Regular season	G	Games coached	W	Games won	L	Games lost	W–L %	Win–loss %
Playoffs	PG	Playoff games	PW	Playoff wins	PL	Playoff losses	PW–L %	Playoff win–loss %

Team	Year	G	W	L	W–L%	Finish	PG	PW	PL	PW–L%	Result
Oklahoma City	2008–09	69	22	47	.319	5th in Northwest	—	—	—	—	Missed Playoffs
Oklahoma City	2009–10	82	50	32	.610	4th in Northwest	6	2	4	.333	Lost in First round
Oklahoma City	2010–11	82	55	27	.671	1st in Northwest	17	9	8	.529	Lost in Conference finals
Oklahoma City	2011–12	66	47	19	.712	1st in Northwest	20	13	7	.650	Lost in NBA Finals
Oklahoma City	2012–13	82	60	22	.732	1st in Northwest	11	5	6	.455	Lost in Conference semifinals
Oklahoma City	2013–14	82	59	23	.720	1st in Northwest	19	10	9	.526	Lost in Conference finals
Oklahoma City	2014–15	82	45	37	.549	2nd in Northwest	—	—	—	—	Missed playoffs
Washington	2016–17	82	49	33	.598	1st in Southeast	13	7	6	.538	Lost in Conference semifinals
Washington	2017–18	82	43	39	.524	2nd in Southeast	6	2	4	.333	Lost in First round
Washington	2018–19	82	32	50	.390	4th in Southeast	—	—	—	—	Missed playoffs
Washington	2019–20	72	25	47	.347	3rd in Southeast	—	—	—	—	Missed playoffs
Washington	2020–21	72	34	38	.472	3rd in Southeast	5	1	4	.200	Lost in First round
Career		935	521	414	.557		97	49	48	.505	
