= Unibe =

Unibe may refer to:

- University of Bern, Switzerland
- Universidad Iberoamericana, Mexico
- Universidad Iberoamericana (UNIBE), Dominican Republic
- Universidad de Iberoamérica (UNIBE), Costa Rica
