= Anthony Pelle =

American basketball player (born 1972)

Personal information
- Born: December 1, 1972 (age 53) New York City, New York, U.S.
- Listed height: 7 ft 0 in (2.13 m)
- Listed weight: 260 lb (118 kg)

Career information
- High school: Stevenson (The Bronx, New York)
- College: Villanova (1990–1993); Fresno State (1994–1995)
- NBA draft: 1995: 2nd round, 44th overall pick
- Drafted by: Denver Nuggets
- Playing career: 1995–2010
- Position: Center

Career history
- 1995–1996: AEK
- 1996–1997: CB Girona
- 1997–1998: Aurora Basket Jesi
- 1998: Zara Imballaggi Fabriano
- 1998–1999: Papagou
- 1999–2000: Fort Wayne Fury
- 1999–2000: Florida Sea Dragons
- 2000–2001: Apollon Limassol
- 2001: Indiana Legends
- 2001: Kansas City Knights
- 2001: Dodge City Legend
- 2002: Roanoke Dazzle
- 2002: Pennsylvania ValleyDawgs
- 2003: Keravnos
- 2003–2004: Madeira
- 2004: AEL
- 2004–2005: Portland Reign
- 2009: ENAD
- 2010: Banvit B.K.
- 2010: Visalia Dawgs
- 2010: Tigers Tübingen
- 2010: Tampa Bay Strong Dogs
- 2010: Washington Raptors

Career highlights
- Greek League All-Star (1996 I)
- Stats at Basketball Reference

Anthony Pelle (born December 1, 1972) is an American professional basketball player who was selected by the Denver Nuggets in the second round (44th overall pick) of the 1995 NBA draft. Pelle, who was born in the Bronx, New York and played collegiately at Villanova University and Fresno State University, did not appear in any NBA games but plied his trade several leagues in Europe, most notably in Greece, Spain and Italy as well as in second-tier leagues in the United States.

== College career ==
After coming out of Stevenson High, in the Bronx Pelle committed to Villanova to play under coach Steve Lappas. He stayed in Villanova for three seasons, appeared in 81 games and averaged 3.1 points per game, 2.5 rebounds per game and 1.2 blocks per game. At the time he left Villanova, in 1993, he was fourth all-time in blocked shots for the school. In May 1993 Pelle was arrested for assaulting another student. After getting transferred to Fresno State he sat out for the 1993–1994 season. In his last year of college eligibility Pelle appeared in 24 games for the Bulldogs averaging 10.8 points per game, 8.0 rebounds per game and 2.0 blocks per game.

== Professional career ==
Pelle was drafted 44th overall in the 1995 NBA draft by the Denver Nuggets. In 1995 Pelle signed for AEK in the Greek Basket League. In the following season he played for CB Girona where he averaged 10.1 points, 8.6 rebounds and 3.0 blocks per game in 33 games. Subsequently, Pelle played for several teams in Italy, Cyprus, Portugal, Turkey, Germany. Pelle has also played in second-tier leagues in the US (ABA, CBA, NBDL and USBL). On September 30, 2002, he signed for the Detroit Pistons as a free agent but he was waived after a few days.
