= Nitin Dhiman =

American physician

Nitin Paul Dhiman
Personal information
- Born: July 24, 1980 (age 46) Overland Park, Kansas, U.S.
- Listed height: 6 ft 3 in (191 cm)
- Listed weight: 201 lb (91 kg)

Career information
- High school: Pembroke Hill (Kansas City, Missouri)
- College: Iberoamerican University (1999–2004)
- Playing career: 2002–2007; 2012–2013
- Position: Guard

Career history
- 2002: Villa Francisca
- 2004: I.G.K.
- 2006: San Diego Wildcats (ABA)
- 2006–2007: I.G.K.
- 2007: NBA Summer League
- 2012: Southern California Summer Pro League
- 2013: Athletes in Action

Career highlights
- 2004 All-Star – Baloncesto Superior de Santo Domingo; 2004 All-Rookie Team – Baloncesto Superior de Santo Domingo; 2004 Three-Point Shootout Champion – Baloncesto Superior de Santo Domingo; 2006 Three-Point Shootout Champion – Baloncesto Superior de Santo Domingo

Nitin Paul Dhiman is an Indian – American physician and former professional basketball player. He is 6 ft 3 in tall and plays guard. He has played professionally in the Dominican Republic in the Baloncesto Superior de Santo Domingo, the American Basketball Association (ABA), and the NBA Southern California Summer Pro League.

== Early life ==
Dhiman was born on July 24, 1980, in Overland Park, Kansas to immigrants from Punjab, India. He attended and played high school basketball at The Pembroke Hill School in Kansas City, Missouri winning two Missouri 2A state championships along with future NBA players JaRon Rush and Kareem Rush. Pembroke Hill was ranked #24 in the country by Street and Smith's College Basketball. Dhiman led the team in three-point field goal percentage at 44%. The state titles were eventually stripped after his AAU Coach Myron Piggie pled guilty to a conspiracy charge for paying $35,500 to high school players on his Kansas City-based team from 1996 to 1998. The players included JaRon Rush, Kareem Rush, Corey Maggette, Korleone Young; and Andre Williams.

== Education and medical career ==
Dhiman fulfilled basic educational requirements at Johnson County Community College in Overland Park, Kansas, but was not part of the basketball team. In the fall of 1999, he enrolled at the Universidad Iberoamericana (UNIBE) School of Medicine in Santo Domingo, Dominican Republic and graduated in March 2005. He completed a rotating internship at Good Samaritan Hospital in Aguadilla, Puerto Rico and residency at Brookdale University Hospital and Medical Center in Brooklyn, New York. Dhiman is board certified in internal medicine.

== Basketball career ==
College: After graduating high school from Pembroke Hill Dhiman received interest to play collegiate basketball at Depauw, Missouri, and University of Missouri–Kansas City but was not offered a scholarship. Instead he attended Universidad Iberoamericana (UNIBE) in Santo Domingo, Dominican Republic, where he was a standout guard on the basketball team. From 1999 to 2003 Dhiman scored 2,334 points and became the school's all-time leading scorer and set numerous school scoring records.

Professional: In 2002, Dhiman was added midseason to Villa Francisca of the National District Superior Basketball League of the Dominican Republic.

For the 2004 season, Dhiman signed with Ivan Guzman Klang (I.G.K.) in the Baloncesto Superior de Santo Domingo. He averaged 15.4 points and was named to the all-star team his rookie season and won the three point contest. In 2005, Dhiman returned to the United States and played at the NBA Summer League led by former NBA center Olden Polynice. The following season he was signed to a free agent deal to the ABA's San Diego Wildcats. Former NBA Co-rookie of the year, Bill Tosheff, served as Dhiman's agent.

During the 2006 season, Dhiman returned to I.G.K. in the Dominican Republic but missed two weeks due to an eye injury. In July 2007, Dhiman teamed with former NBA player Steffond Johnson at the NBA Summer Pro League in Los Angeles. After a brief hiatus to continue his medical practice, Dhiman again competed at the 2012 NBA Summer Pro League in Los Angeles while playing for former NBA veteran Jerry Reynolds. In 2013, Dhiman joined sports ministry, Athletes in Action, to compete on an exhibition tour against collegiate and professional teams in Puerto Rico.

== Personal life ==
Dhiman speaks fluent English and Spanish.

- 2002: Villa Francisca (Dominican Republic)
- 2004: I.G.K. (Dominican Republic)
- 2005: NBA Summer League (United States)
- 2006: ABA: San Diego Wildcats (United States)
- 2006–2007: I.G.K. (Dominican Republic)
- 2007: NBA Summer League (United States)
- 2012: Southern California Summer Pro League (United States)
- 2013: AIA (Puerto Rico)

== Career highlights ==
- 2004 All-Star – Baloncesto Superior de Santo Domingo
- 2004 All-Rookie Team – Baloncesto Superior de Santo Domingo
- 2004 Three-Point Shootout Champion – Baloncesto Superior de Santo Domingo
- 2006 Three-Point Shootout Champion – Baloncesto Superior de Santo Domingo

== College statistics ==
Legend
GP	Games played	GS	Games started	MPG	Minutes per game
FG%	Field goal percentage	3P%	3-point field goal percentage	FT%	Free throw percentage
RPG	Rebounds per game	APG	Assists per game	SPG	Steals per game
BPG	Blocks per game	PPG	Points per game	**Bold**	Career high

Year	Team	GP	GS	MPG	FG%	3P%	FT%	RPG	APG	SPG	BPG	PPG
1999–2000	Iberoamerican University	30	30	39.1	48.3	39.7	72.5	2.0	4.2	2.0	0.1	21.0
2000–2001	Iberoamerican University	30	30	36.4	48.8	43.7	80.0	2.3	3.9	2.1	0.0	19.9
2001–2002	Iberoamerican University	30	30	37.3	48.8	41.9	90.3	2.3	3.7	1.9	0.1	19.8
2002–2003	Iberoamerican University	30	30	34.8	47.6	38.6	84.2	1.7	3.1	2.1	0.0	17.1
	Total	120	120	36.9	48.4	41.0	80.7	2.1	3.8	2.0	0.1	19.4

== Professional statistics ==
Year	Team	GP	GS	MPG	FG%	3P%	FT%	RPG	APG	SPG	BPG	PPG
2002	Villa Francisca	21	1	18.3	43.9	40.4	85.7	1.6	2.4	0.7	0.0	11.8
2004	I.G.K.	25	22	24.2	46.7	40.0	81.4	1.7	2.5	1.2	0.1	15.7
2006	I.G.K.	25	18	24.4	46.4	44.9	86.1	0.9	2.1	1.5	0.0	13.2
2006	San Diego Wildcats	3	1	20.3	41.7	38.4	–	2.0	1.3	1.0	0.0	8.3
2013	AIA	5	3	19.6	52.6	57.1	66.7	1.0	1.6	1.4	0.0	9.2
