= JaRon Rush =

American basketball coach and former player (born 1979)

Personal information
- Born: April 12, 1979 (age 47) Kansas City, Missouri, U.S.
- Listed height: 6 ft 6 in (1.98 m)
- Listed weight: 205 lb (93 kg)

Career information
- High school: The Pembroke Hill School (Kansas City, Missouri)
- College: UCLA (1998–2000)
- NBA draft: 2000: undrafted
- Playing career: 2000–2001
- Position: Small forward
- Coaching career: 2018–present

Career history

Playing
- 2000–2001: Los Angeles Stars
- 2001: Roanoke Dazzle

Coaching
- 2018–2019: Kansas City Tornadoes (player development)

Career highlights
- Pac-10 All-Freshman team (1999); McDonald's All-American (1998); 2× First-team Parade All-American (1997, 1998); Mr. Show-Me Basketball (1998)

JaRon Maurice Rush (born April 12, 1979) is an American professional basketball coach and former player. A small forward from Kansas City, Missouri, he played college basketball for the UCLA Bruins. Undrafted in the 2000 NBA draft, Rush played two seasons professionally for the Los Angeles Stars of the American Basketball Association (ABA) and the Roanoke Dazzle of the NBA Development League (D-League).

== Career ==
Rush played at the University of California, Los Angeles, where he and Dan Gadzuric were both named the team's most valuable freshman in 1999. He was also named to the Pacific-10 Conference All-Freshman team. In his sophomore year, he hit a jumper with three seconds remaining to defeat then-No. 1-ranked Stanford in a 94–93 overtime road upset. Believing he would be a first-round pick, he declared for the 2000 NBA draft but was not selected. The Los Angeles Daily News later called Rush "UCLA's poster child for an ill-advised exit."

Rush was drafted in the ABA in 2000 by the Kansas City Knights. He was traded before the start of the season to the Los Angeles Stars, where he played the 2000–2001 season. He entered into rehab for alcoholism in 2001. He was the final cut of the Seattle SuperSonics of the National Basketball Association during their 2001 training camp. He played 14 games for the Roanoke Dazzle in the D-League and averaged just 1.8 points before being granted his unconditional release in December 2001. He was signed to the Knights' practice squad in January 2002 before being cut in February for missing practice. He went into rehab again and retired from basketball that year. Rush accepted a job as freshman girls B-team basketball coach at Blue Valley Northwest High School in 2006. He was employed at a public relations firm in 2007 while finishing college.

He played high school basketball at The Pembroke Hill School, leading the team to three state championships. The state titles were eventually stripped after AAU Coach Myron Piggie pleaded guilty to a conspiracy charge for paying $35,500 to five high school players on his Kansas City-based team from 1996 to 1998. The players, aside from JaRon and his younger brother Kareem, were Corey Maggette, Korleone Young and Andre Williams.

Rush won the James A. DiRenna Award as the best basketball player in the Kansas City metro area, winning it outright as a sophomore and junior, and sharing the award with Victor Williams of Wyandotte High School (and later Oklahoma State) as a senior.

His final play in high school was a windmill dunk which broke the backboard.

== Personal ==
Rush's younger brothers Kareem and Brandon are also professional basketball players. With ex-girlfriend Sarah Hofstra, he had a son, Shea, who was born during his senior year in high school. In 2013, Shea made the basketball team as a high school freshman at The Barstow School in Kansas City. Rush, who is living in Kansas City, meets with his son regularly and they enjoy playing basketball together. His son committed to play for North Carolina and head coach Roy Williams in 2016.
