= Whitney Terrell =

American novelist

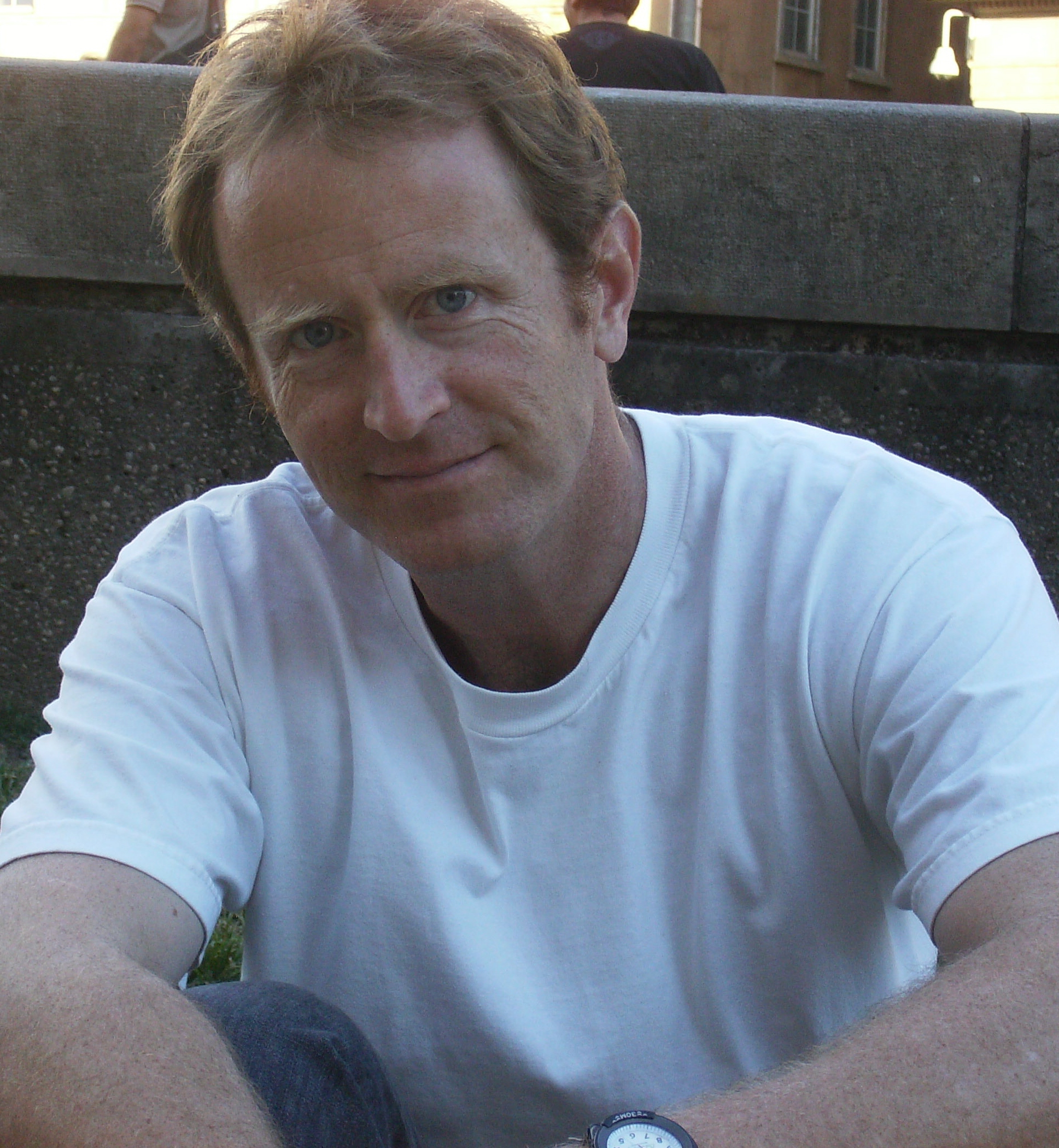
- Born: October 3, 1967 (age 58); Kansas City, Missouri, U.S.
- Education: Princeton University; University of Iowa
- Occupations: Author, Associate Professor of Creative Writing
- Writing career
- Genres: Fiction, nonfiction

Whitney Terrell (born October 3, 1967) is an American writer and educator from Kansas City, Missouri. Terrell has published three novels and his writing has appeared in Harper's Magazine, Slate, The New York Times, The Washington Post Magazine, and others outlets.

== Early life, education, personal life ==
Whitney Terrell was born in Kansas City, Missouri, and attended high school at The Pembroke Hill School, where he was captain of the soccer team and lead guitarist of a band called The Caste. He earned a bachelor's degree in English literature from Princeton University in 1991. In 1992, Terrell moved to Iowa City, where he completed his MFA at the Iowa Writers' Workshop. During his time at the University of Iowa, Terrell studied with James Alan McPherson who sparked his interest in writing about race in Kansas City, which is the focus of Terrell's first two novels.

Terrell lives in Kansas City, Missouri, with his wife and two children. He has taught at The University of Missouri–Kansas City since 2004.

== Professional life ==
After earning his master's degree, Terrell worked as a fact checker for The New York Observer. From 1996 to 2001, Terrell taught at Rockhurst University in Kansas City and became the Writer in Residence from 2000 to 2003.

His first novel, The Huntsman, was published in 2001. The novel centers on a young African American who elbows his way into Kansas City's white, upper-class society while searching for answers about his family's past. The New York Times chose it as a notable book and The Kansas City Star and the St. Louis Post-Dispatch selected it as a best book of 2001.

In 2005, Terrell published his second novel, The King of Kings County. This book elaborated on the relationship between real estate and race in Kansas City, tracing the life of an ambitious developer who uses racial covenants to build a segregated suburban empire. The book won the William Rockhill Nelson award and was named a best book of 2005 by The Christian Science Monitor.

In 2006, Terrell was named to a list of best writers under 40 by a panel of National Book Critics Circle Award members.

In 2006 and 2010, Terrell embedded with the U.S. Army in Iraq. He covered the war for The Washington Post Magazine, Slate and NPR.

Terrell was the Hodder Fellow at Princeton University for 2008–2009 and a visiting lecturer in 2011. He was the New Letters Writer-in-Residence at the University of Missouri-Kansas City from 2004 to 2014. In 2014, he became an Assistant Professor of Creative Writing at UMKC. In 2018, he was promoted to Associate Professor of Creative Writing at UMKC.

Terrell's third book, The Good Lieutenant: A Novel, was published in June 2016 by Farrar, Straus and Giroux. The novel is told in reverse order, following Lieutenant Emma Fowler as she leads a platoon of male soldiers through tragedy and suspicious circumstances during America's war in Iraq. The Boston Globe and The Washington Post selected the novel as a best book of 2016.

Since 2017, he has co-hosted the Fiction/Non/Fiction podcast with novelist V.V. Ganeshananthan. The podcast is presented by Literary Hub and covers the intersection of literature and the news.

== Selected bibliography ==
=== Books ===
- The Good Lieutenant: A Novel, Farrar, Straus and Giroux, June 2016 ISBN 0374164738
- The King of Kings County, Viking Penguin, August 2005 ISBN 0670034258
- The Huntsman, Viking Penguin, August 2001 ISBN 0670894656
