= Joan Dillon (historic preservation activist) =

American writer

Joan Kent Dillon
- Born: April 30, 1925; Lafayette, Indiana
- Died: January 18, 2009 (aged 83); Chatham, Massachusetts
- Known for: author, historic preservation activist
- Parent(s): Gladys and Richard Kent

Joan Kent Dillon (30 April 1925 – 18 January 2009) was a teacher, a nationally known historic preservation activist and an author.

== Biography ==
=== Early life ===
Joan Kent was born 30 April 1925 in Lafayette, Indiana, to Gladys and Richard Kent of Tuxedo Park, New York. She grew up in St. Louis, Missouri, spending summers at the family's summer home in Whalewalk Farm, Orleans, Massachusetts. She attended Wheeler School in Providence, Rhode Island but graduated from Mary Institute in St. Louis in 1943. Dillon earned a Bachelor of Arts from Smith College in 1947. Her husband-to-be, George Chaffee Dillon of Liberty, Missouri, had served in the Navy during the Second World War, rising to the rank of Lt. Commander, then receiving an MBA from Harvard Business School. They met in Cambridge and married on 11 September 1948. That same year the couple moved to Kansas City, Missouri where George went to work first for J. Bruening & Co. then Butler Manufacturing in 1949, eventually becoming president and chairman of the board. The Dillons had two daughters and a son. Joan Dillon went on to complete a master's degree in Medieval History at the University of Missouri in 1969 with a thesis on Medieval architecture. From 1962 to 1971 she taught Ancient and Medieval History at Sunset Hill School (now The Pembroke Hill School).

=== The Folly Theater ===
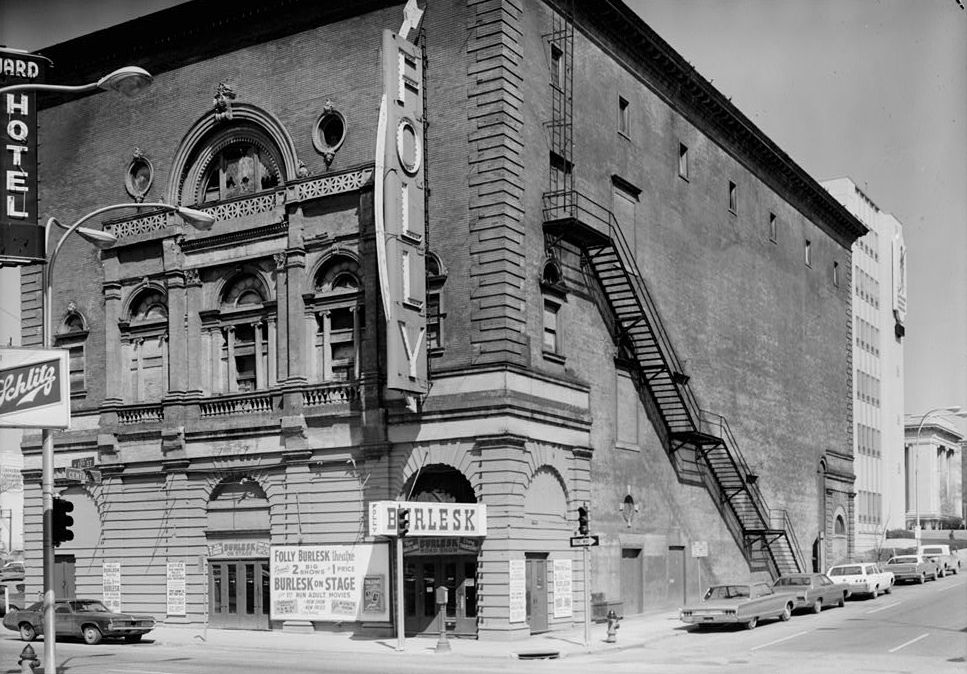
The Folly Theater in 1973 as a burlesque house, 300 W. 12th St., Kansas City, Missouri, as documented by the Historic American Buildings Survey

The Folly Theater is a historic theater in Kansas City, Missouri. It originally opened as the Standard Theater on 23 September 1900 and featured on the burlesque and vaudeville circuit. Business started declining in 1928 and the theater was closed between 1932 and 1941. The theater began showing adult movies in 1969 but continued to physically decline. The balcony had been closed by the fire marshall in 1964. The theater again closed in January 1974. The theater's then owners, Annbar Associates and Elk Realty of New York, announced that if a buyer could not be identified by the end of the year, the theater would be demolished to make way for a parking lot.

A group of local historic preservation activists, including Dillon and William N. Deramus III, formed the nonprofit Performing Arts Foundation, to raise the money to purchase and restore the theater. The theater was offered for sale for $950,000. The Performing Arts Foundation raised $350,000 in contributions and through negotiation convinced Annbar Associates to offer the remaining $600,000 of the purchase price as a donation.

Folly Theater was added to the National Register of Historic Places in 1974.

But preventing the building from being demolished was just the beginning. The building was in a considerable state of disrepair. Most of the windows were broken. A chandelier had fallen onto the balcony. Pornographic magazines rotted in closets. Nineteen tones of pigeon dung would be removed from the building. Between 1974 and 1987 Dillon and the Performing Arts Foundation raised $5 million for the restoration of the theater, including a $1 million grant from the Department of Housing and Urban Development. The theater was reopened in 1981. A plaque was mounted on the stage recognizing Joan Dillon's work in saving the Folly Theater. A pair of plaster pigeons installed above the box office by architect Bob Berkebile are named Joan and George after the Dillons.

=== A national role ===
Her work saving and restoring the Folly Theater made Dillon a nationally known historic preservation advocate. She became a board member of the League of Historic American Theaters from 1978 to 1981 and 1992–1998, the National Trust for Historic Preservation from 1980 to 1990, President Reagan's Committee on the Arts and Humanities from 1982 to 1990 and the Smithsonian National Board from 1989 to 1995. Her board and committee work required frequent travel to Washington, D.C.

=== American Theaters ===
For a number of years Dillon had been thinking about a book documenting America's nineteenth century historic theaters. Through her work on historic preservation, Dillon met architectural historian David Naylor. Naylor had already produced two books on movie theaters, American Picture Palaces: The Architecture of Fantasy (1981) and Great American Movie Theaters (1987), and during the years 1994-1996 the two worked together on Dillon's idea. They began by contacting one thousand five hundred theaters by telephone and postcard. They then sent a follow-up questionnaire to more than a thousand from the first list. The two then traveled extensively with one or both Dillon and Naylor eventual visiting two hundred and fifty theaters. Eventually the two arrived upon a list of forty theaters, arranged into seven broad categories, they deemed representative of the breadth of American nineteenth century theaters (see next section for detail on their list and categories). The record of their survey, American Theaters: Performance Halls of the Nineteenth Century, was published in 1997.

=== Art and Asian Scholar Rock Collector ===
Joan Dillon had a lifetime interest and passion for art and Asian scholar rocks. In the 1960s, on a visit to Paris, France with her teenage son Kent Dillon, she discovered large Art Nouveau posters in various French art galleries before it was widely popular. In the ensuing years, she purchased over 30 of these large posters. She also had a lifelong passion for rocks of all kinds. She had an eagle-eye walking the beaches of Cape Cod. She kept a rock polisher grinding away in the garage for years. Later she discovered Asian scholar rocks and purchased a variety of rocks from dealers in London, New York, Chicago, San Francisco, China, and Japan. On her death, her entire collection of over 100 scholar rocks was donated to the University of Colorado Boulder Art Museum. In 2014, the Museum featured rocks from the Joan and George Dillon Collection with Richard Artschwager sculpture in the Conversations Between Objects exhibition series.

=== Later life ===
Throughout her life Dillon continued to spend summers in Cape Cod. In 1976 she bought a home in North Chatham, Massachusetts. Dillon continued her historic preservation activities in the Cape Cod region. She worked in Acquisitions for the Cape Cod Museum of Art from 2007 to 2009. In 2007 she published Barns of Cape Cod with her son, Kent C. Dillon and photographer Blandon Belushin. For the last ten years of her life she lived in Cape Cod permanently and it was in her home there that Joan Dillon died at the age of 83 of leukemia and cardiac arrest on 18 January 2009.

== American Theaters ==
After a brief historical essay, the bulk of the book consists of the section, "A Revue of Nineteenth Century American Theaters." From the thousands of initially identified theaters, the forty that Dillon and Naylor selected as exemplary of nineteenth century theaters are the following.

=== Eastern Town Hall Opera Houses ===
- Chester Meetinghouse (Chester, Connecticut)
- Provincetown Town Hall (Provincetown, Massachusetts)
- Claremont Opera House (Wilmington, North Carolina)
- Thalian Hall (Wilmington, North Carolina)

=== Theatrical Venues in the Midwest ===
- Calumet Theater (Calumet, Michigan)
- What Cheer Opera House (What Cheer, Iowa)
- Grand Opera House (Oshkosh, Wisconsin)
- Pella Opera House (Pella, Iowa)
- Pabst Theater (Milwaukee, Wisconsin)

=== Western Boomtown Opera Houses ===
- Schieffelin Hall and Bird Cage Theatre (Tombstone, Arizona)
- Garcia Opera House (Socorro, New Mexico)
- Central City Opera House (Central City, Colorado)
- Eureka Opera House (Eureka, Nevada)
- Wheeler Opera House (Aspen, Colorado)

=== Revival Halls and the Chautauqua Circuit ===
- Ryman Auditorium (Nashville, Tennessee)
- The Temple (Ocean Park, Maine)
- The Great Auditorium (Ocean Grove, New Jersey)
- Chautauqua Auditorium (Boulder, Colorado)

=== Community Halls and Library Theaters ===
- St. George Social Hall (St. George, Utah)
- Tivoli Turnhalle (Denver, Colorado)
- Mechanics Hall (Worcester, Massachusetts)
- Library Theater (Warren, Pennsylvania)
- Mabel Tainter Memorial Theater (Menomonie, Wisconsin)
- Cumston Hall (Monmouth, Maine)
- Haskell Opera House (Derby Line, Vermont and Rock Island, Quebec)

=== Victorian Playhouses ===
- Symphony Hall (Allentown, Pennsylvania)
- Grand Opera House (Meridian, Mississippi)
- Fulton Opera House (Lancaster, Pennsylvania)
- Goodspeed Opera House (East Haddam, Connecticut)
- Academy of Music (Northampton, Massachusetts)
- Colonial Theater (Boston, Massachusetts)
- Folly Theater (Kansas City, Missouri)

=== Grand Opera Houses and Concert Halls ===
- Steinert Hall (Boston, Massachusetts)
- Granger Hall (National City, California)
- Academy of Music (Philadelphia, Pennsylvania)
- Grand Opera House (Wilmington, Delaware)
- Grand 1894 Opera House (Galveston, Texas)
- Cincinnati Music Hall (Cincinnati, Ohio)
- Auditorium Theatre (Chicago, Illinois)

== Joan Dillon papers ==
Joan Dillon donated her papers relating to the production of American Theaters to the University of Maryland, College Park in April 2003. They are available as the Joan Dillon papers in the State of Maryland and Historical Collections in the Special Collections at Hornbake Library.
