= Folly Theater =

- Standard Theatre (Folly Theater)
- U.S. National Register of Historic Places
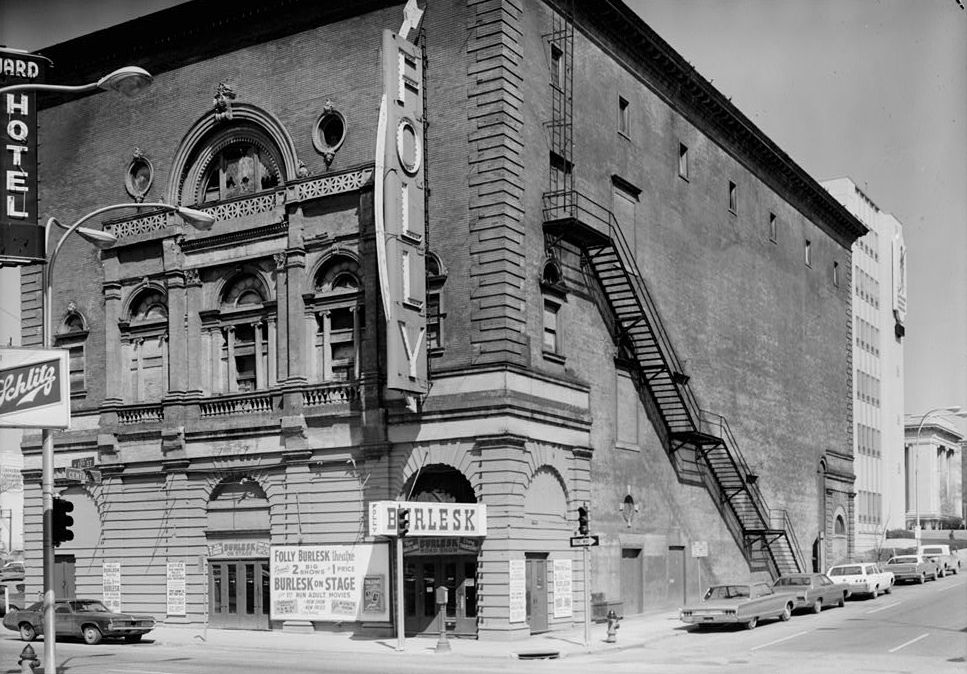
- The Folly Theater in 1973 as a burlesque house

- Location within Missouri Location within the United States
- Location: 300 W. 12th St., Kansas City, Missouri
- Coordinates: 39°6′7″N 94°35′13″W
- Built: 1900
- Architect: Louis S. Curtiss
- NRHP reference No.: 74001074
- Added to NRHP: June 05, 1974

The Standard Theatre, now known as the Folly Theater and also known as the Century Theater and Shubert's Missouri, is a former vaudeville hall in downtown Kansas City, Missouri. Built in 1900, it was designed by Kansas City architect Louis S. Curtiss. The theater was associated with the adjoining Edward Hotel (known later as the Hotel Missouri), which was also designed by Curtiss; the hotel was demolished in 1965.

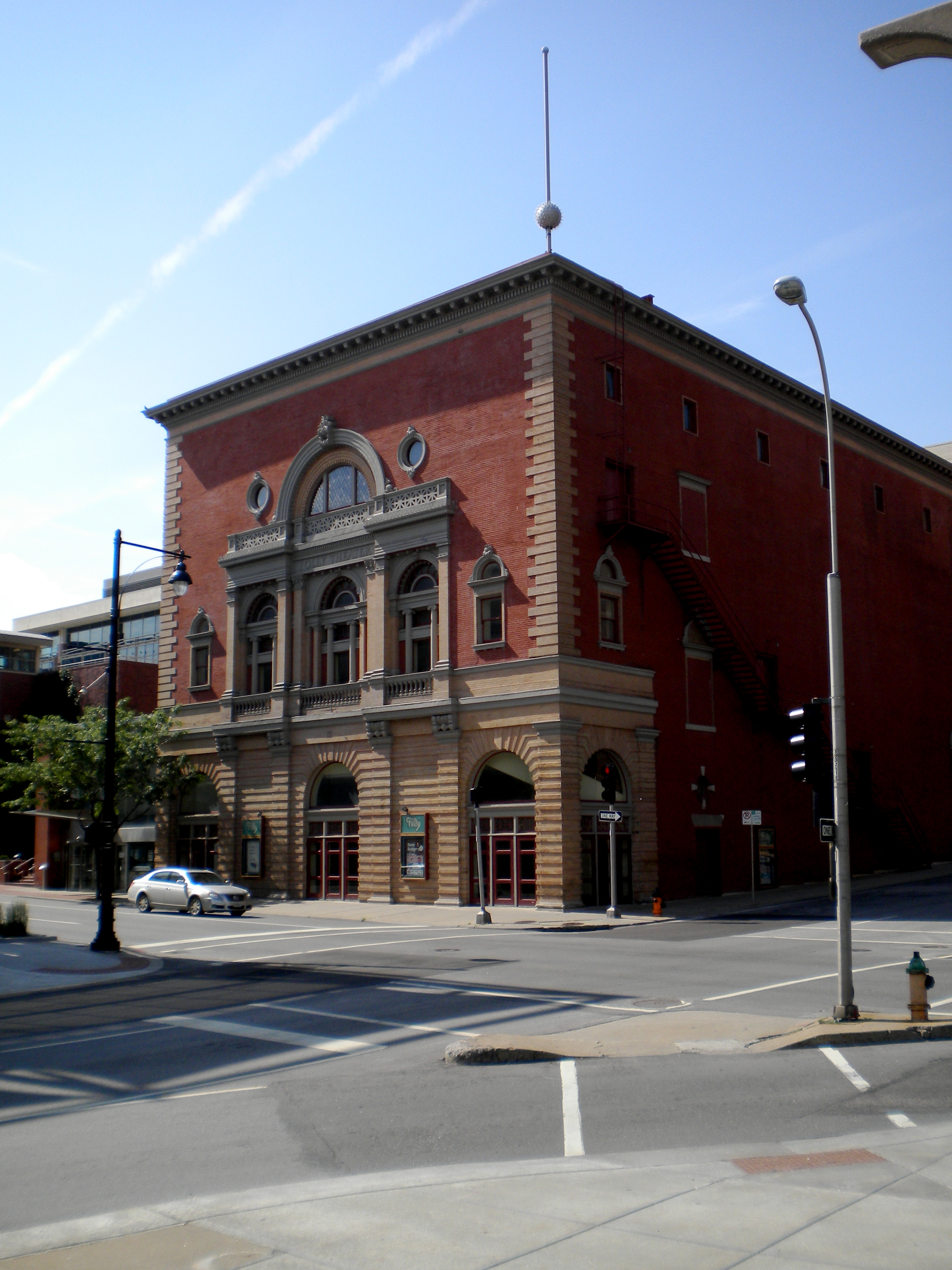
The Folly Theatre, 2010. The ball on the pole on the top is dropped each New Year's Eve in Kansas City's version of the Times Square Ball.

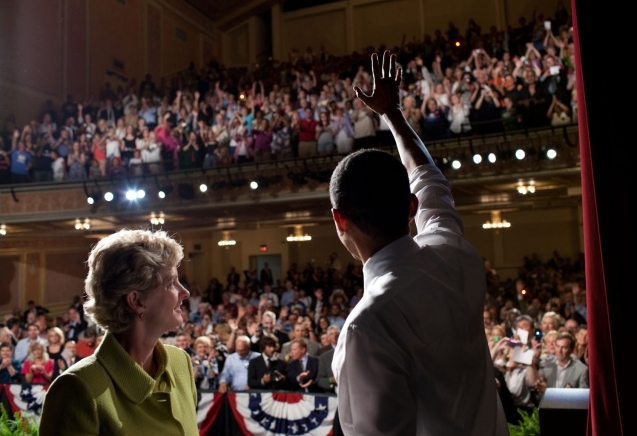
Robin Carnahan campaigning with Barack Obama at the Folly on July 8, 2010

== History ==
The Standard Theatre opened with 2,400 seats on September 23, 1900, featuring burlesque and vaudeville. It was built by Colonel Edward Butler of St. Louis, Missouri, at a cost of $250,000, for his son to present shows on the Empire vaudeville circuit. In 1901, a fire at the nearby Coates Opera House caused opera and comic opera performances to be moved to the Standard, featuring such performers as Sarah Bernhardt, Richard Mansfield, and Maude Adams. The theater's name changed to the "Century" in 1902. The Century featured acts from the Empire burlesque circuit, including Al Jolson, Fannie Brice, and Eddie Foy. In addition to theater acts, the Century featured prizefighting and wrestling, with appearances by Jack Johnson and Jack Dempsey. Johnson stayed in the manager's apartment, as hotels refused to rent him a room.

The Shubert brothers bought the Century in 1923 and renamed it "Shubert's Missouri" after extensive renovations by Shubert architect Herbert J. Krapp. The Shuberts booked dramatic productions including Shakespeare and O'Neill plays. The Marx Brothers performed I'll Say She Is for three weeks in 1923–24, the long run convincing the Shuberts to continue operating the theater. After 1928, business began falling off and the theater was used for touring shows on an intermittent basis until it closed in 1932. After a tax sale it eventually reopened in 1941 as "The Folly", featuring striptease. Performers included Gypsy Rose Lee and Tempest Storm, and Chesty Gabor before the Folly closed in January 1974. The theater began showing "adult" movies in 1969, apparently prompting an unknown person to plant a dynamite stick in a drainpipe on December 29, 1969.

In 1974 the theater's then owners, Annbar Associates and Elk Realty of New York announced that if a new buyer could not be identified by the end of the year, the theater would be demolished to make way for a parking lot. A group of local historic preservation activists, including Joan Dillon and William N. Deramus III, formed a nonprofit, the Performing Arts Foundation, to raise the money to purchase and restore the theater. The theater was offered for sale for $950,000. Performing Arts Foundation raised $350,000 in contributions and through negotiation convinced Annbar Associates to offer the remaining $600,000 of the purchase price as a donation. Following the Folly's listing on the National Register of Historic Places in 1974, a "Strip the Folly" fundraiser was held featuring Sally Rand, who had performed at the Folly. After seven years a full renovation was completed in 1981, including the construction of an annex on the site of the former Edward Hotel.

In the Folly's centennial year of 2000, a new lobby, restrooms, and second-floor Shareholders' Room were added. In 2005, the twenty-fifth anniversary of the Folly's reopening, the auditorium's original color scheme was restored. Plans are now under way, and approval has been granted by the Kansas City Landmarks Commission, to install a marquee sign that closely mimics the original Folly signage.

The Performing Arts Foundation of Kansas City, d.b.a. The Folly Theater, is a 501 (c)(3) non-profit corporation whose mission is "to preserve Kansas City's oldest historic theater as a premier performance venue by presenting, producing, and hosting a wide range of quality events for the community". The Folly produces a Jazz Series, a Kids Series, and "Cyprus Avenue Live!" performances by artists ranging from blues to rock and country. It hosts the Harriman-Jewell Series of classical performers, the Friends of Chamber Music series, the Heartland Men's Chorus, and KC Burlesque's Kansas City Burlesque Festival, the first burlesque performance revival of The Folly Theater.

== Description ==
The Neo-Palladian facade uses Carthage limestone and red pressed brick, with an adapted Palladian window centered in the facade. Rather than a fully glazed infill within the limestone Palladian framework, the lower portion of the unit uses three arched windows with an entablature over the center window dividing it from the lunette under the principal arch. The street level is heavily rusticated limestone with three arched entrances and wrapping a short way around the right (east) side to form an additional arch. The east wall contains small limestone-framed ventilation openings near the top, as well as emergency exits and a 19-foot (5.8 m) high opening for stage scenery. The building is 125 feet (38 m) deep, 70 feet (21 m) wide and 65 feet (20 m) high.

The interior structure mixes steel and wood construction. There is a basement under the stage, housing mechanical systems and backstage service spaces. The main floor is entered through a lobby and a box office area. The house contains three sections of seats facing a highly decorated proscenium arch. The house is flanked by balcony-level boxes, with the main balcony to the rear. The stage is provided with a fly loft, fly balconies, a scenery workshop, and ten dressing rooms. Interior decoration is predominantly red and gold.

The exterior is largely unaltered, but the interior has been substantially renovated. In 1923, the lobby was reduced in size, moving the box office and eliminating a secondary box office for the balcony, while the balcony itself and a gallery level were replaced by a single larger balcony, reducing seating capacity. Plasterwork in the upper levels was replaced at this time, and a manager's apartment was removed.

Current seating capacity is 1,078 seats.
