= Los Angeles Stars (2000–2001) =

- League: ABA
- Founded: 2000
- Folded: 2001
- History: Los Angeles Stars (2000–2001)
- Arena: Great Western Forum
- Location: Los Angeles, California
- Head coach: Paul Westhead

The Los Angeles Stars were a minor league basketball team in the American Basketball Association (ABA) during the league's inaugural 2000–01 season. The Stars were one of the league's initial eight teams. The Stars were defunct after its initial season.

To attract fans, the ABA had rosters with former National Basketball Association (NBA) players and past college basketball stars with local ties. The Stars used their territorial draft picks to select Ed O'Bannon and Tyus Edney, who won the 1995 NCAA championship together at UCLA. O'Bannon, a former first-round draft pick in the 1995 NBA draft, played for the Stars, while Edney played for the Indiana Pacers in the NBA that season. O'Bannon was joined on the team by former UCLA players Toby Bailey, who also played with O'Bannon on the 1995 championship team, and JaRon Rush.

The Stars' head coach was former Los Angeles Lakers and Loyola Marymount head coach Paul Westhead, while former UC Irvine star Scott Brooks was an assistant coach as well as a player on the Stars. Former Lakers star Jamaal Wilkes was hired as vice president of basketball operations. His former college coach at UCLA, the legendary John Wooden, agreed to join the Stars as a consultant at Wilkes' request.

The team's record was 28–13 in 2000–2001, and their season ended with a 132–112 first-round playoff loss to the Kansas City Knights.

== Roster ==
Final Los Angeles Stars roster
Players

Pos.	No.	Player	Height	Weight	DOB	From
G	34	Toby Bailey	6 ft 6 in (1.98 m)	220 lb (100 kg)		UCLA
G	4	Scott Brooks	5 ft 11 in (1.80 m)	170 lb (77 kg)		UC Irvine
G	50	Jimmy Carroll	6 ft 6 in (1.98 m)	205 lb (93 kg)		Nevada
F	44	Tony Farmer	6 ft 9 in (2.06 m)	255 lb (116 kg)		Nebraska
F	33	Kevin Freeman	6 ft 7 in (2.01 m)	235 lb (107 kg)		Connecticut
C	24	Paul Grant	7 ft 0 in (2.13 m)	255 lb (116 kg)		Wisconsin
F	31	Ed O'Bannon	6 ft 8 in (2.03 m)	235 lb (107 kg)		UCLA
F	23	JaRon Rush	6 ft 7 in (2.01 m)	215 lb (98 kg)		UCLA
F	54	Mark Sanford	6 ft 9 in (2.06 m)	218 lb (99 kg)		Washington
G	5	Curtis Staples	6 ft 3 in (1.91 m)	196 lb (89 kg)		Virginia
F	32	Jerod Ward	6 ft 9 in (2.06 m)	230 lb (104 kg)		Michigan
C		Jameel Watkins	6 ft 10 in (2.08 m)			Georgetown
G	21	Tyson Wheeler	5 ft 10 in (1.78 m)	170 lb (77 kg)		Rhode Island

Coaches
Head coach
- Paul Westhead
Assistant(s)
- Scott Brooks
- Earl Cureton

Legend
- (DP) Unsigned draft pick
- (FA) Free agent
- (S) Suspended
- Injured

Roster
