= Shombi Sharp =

American diplomat

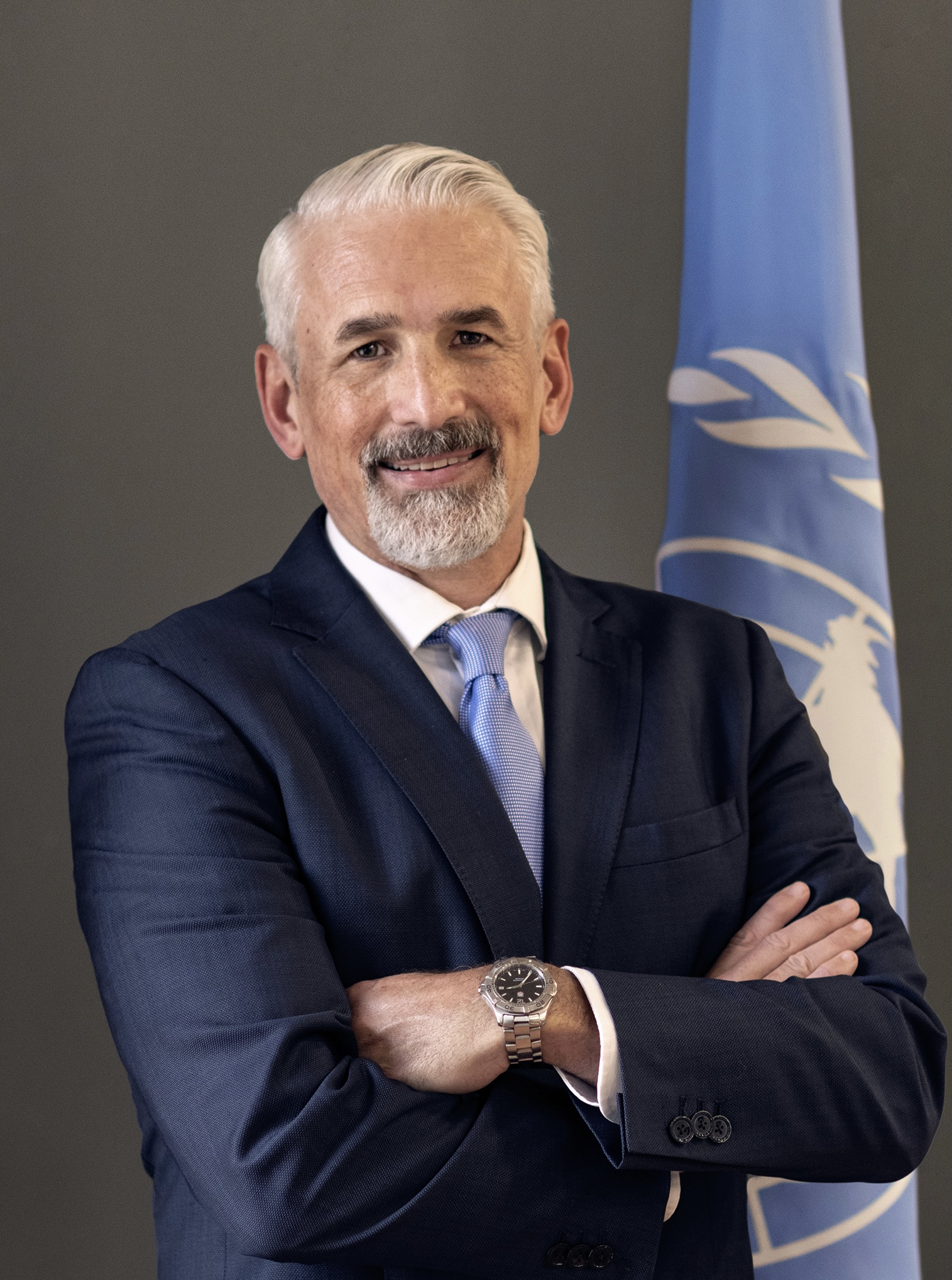

Deputy Executive Secretary of UNESCAP
- Incumbent
- Assumed office December 1, 2025

Personal details
- Born: 14 November 1969 Los Angeles, California, United States
- Education: University of Colorado; University of Kansas
- Profession: United Nations diplomat, economist

Shombi Sharp is an American diplomat, currently serving as Deputy Executive Secretary of the Economic and Social Commission for Asia and the Pacific of the United Nations, since his appointment by UN Secretary-General António Guterres on 1 December 2025.

== Career ==
As DES for Partnerships and Coordination, under the overall guidance of the Executive Secretary, Sharp is responsible for managing relationships between UNESCAP and regional inter-governmental bodies such as ASEAN, ECO, SCO, SAARC, the Pacific Islands Forum PIF and PIDF, BIMSTEC, as well as other UN Agencies, UN Resident Coordinators and multilateral development banks. Sharp also oversees the five UNESCAP sub-regional offices and leads the Follow-up and Review of the 2030 Agenda in ESCAP, including assisting member States in preparing their Voluntary National and Local Reviews, the organisation of the Asia-Pacific Forum on Sustainable Development (APFSD), and other duties.

UNESCAP is the most inclusive intergovernmental platform in the Asia-Pacific region, spanning a vast geographic territory from Turkey in the west to the Pacific Islands in the east. The Commission promotes cooperation among its 53 member States and 9 associate members, including research, innovation, policy advice and capacity building in pursuit of sustainable development solutions. ESCAP is one of the five regional commissions of the United Nations, established under the jurisdiction of the United Nations Economic and Social Council.

Immediately prior to his appointment with UNESCAP, Sharp served as UN Resident Coordinator in India from 2021 to 2025 and UN Resident Coordinator in Armenia from 2018 to 2021. As UNRC, Sharp was the direct representative of the UN Secretary-General and highest ranking UN official based in the each respective country, carrying a diplomatic rank equivalent to Ambassador of a foreign state. He also served as Designated Official for Security of the UN system in country.

Previous to that, Sharp served in several capacities in various parts of the world, including Southern Africa, New York, Eastern Europe, Central Asia, the Middle East and the South Caucasus. He is both a published author of works in the health economics field and a seasoned manager of technical assistance portfolios at the country and regional levels for over 20 years, with graduate training in economics and public health management. Sharp has served in a number of advisory positions, including as a member of the World Health Organization's Knowledge Hub Advisory Board in Zagreb, Croatia, and as a World Bank Expert Panel member for Europe and Central Asia in Washington, D.C.. He was designated a USAID “Policy Champion” and nominated for the UNDP Administrator's Award, while having also spoken at numerous international fora, including the European Health Forum, Central European University, the Council on Foreign Relations, the Goldman Sachs Global Leaders Programme, and the Social Science Research Council in NY, USA. Following several years in advertising, Sharp began his international development career in 1997 as Project Manager and Crisis Response Coordinator for CARE International in Harare, Zimbabwe.

Upon joining the UN though the UNDP young leader programme LEAD, he served as the Moscow-based Assistant Resident Representative of the United Nations Development Programme (UNDP) in Russia, from 2002 to 2005, and as a Programme Manager in the Western Balkans cluster of the UNDP Regional Bureau for Europe and CIS (RBEC) in New York, USA from 2005 to 2006. From 2006 to 2010, Sharp led the Regional HIV/AIDS Practice for RBEC, covering over 20 countries and from 2010-2014 he was posted in Beirut as Deputy Country Director for UNDP Lebanon. There Sharp also served as Lead Coordinator for the Social Cohesion and Livelihoods sector of the international community's Regional Response Plan to the Syrian refugee crisis, coordinating a sectoral work plan of nearly US$100 million annually across 27 implementing organisations. From 2014 to 2018 Sharp served as the UNDP Deputy Resident Representative in Georgia, followed by UNDP Resident Representative in Armenia in 2018.

== Education ==
Sharp graduated from the University of Colorado at Boulder with a master's degree in Economics and the University of Kansas with a Bachelor of Business Administration degree. He has also completed the Executive Programme at the University of Chicago, Booth School of Business, and received a Postgraduate Diploma in HIV/AIDS Management from the National Medical University of South Africa and Stellenbosch University in South Africa.

== Personal life ==
A US citizen, Sharp was born in Los Angeles, California and raised in Kansas City, where he attended the Pembroke Hill School. He and his wife, the artist Sarah Watterson, have two children, Avery Sharp and Annika Sharp.
