= Fresno Flames =

Defunct basketball team in California, US

The Fresno Flames were a professional basketball franchise based in Fresno, California in 1988. The team played one season in the World Basketball League before folding in March 1989. The WBL was a league for players 6' 5" tall and under.

Scott Brooks began his career with the Flames as an undrafted free agent out of the University of California, Irvine. He later played for 10 years in the NBA and later became a head coach in the NBA, winning Coach-of-the-Year honors with the Oklahoma City Thunder in 2010.

The Flames played its home games at the Selland Arena.

== Season by season record ==
Season	GP	W	L	Pct.	GB	Finish	Playoffs
1988	54	25	29	.463	7	5th WBL	Did Not Qualify
Totals	54	25	29	.463	7	–	Playoff record 0–0

== Sources ==
- http://www.apbr.org/wbl88-92.html
