= The Pembroke Hill School =

Prep school in Kansas City, Missouri, US

Coordinates: 39.034925°N 94.606167°W

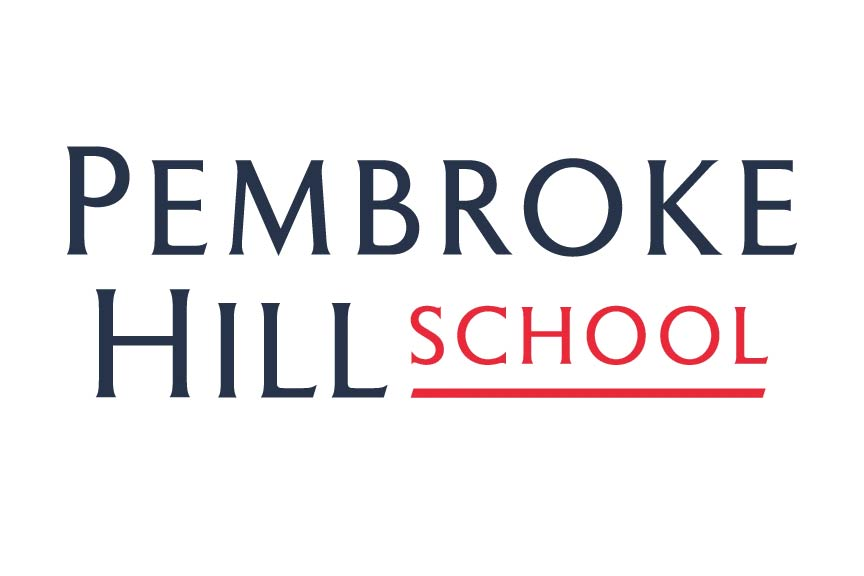
- Kansas City, Missouri; United States

Information
- Type: Independent
- Motto: Freedom with Responsibility
- Established: 1910 – Pembroke-Country Day (boys), 1913 – Sunset Hill (girls), 1984 – Pembroke Hill (coed)
- Head of School: Brad Shelley
- Faculty: 110
- Enrollment: 1,200
- Average class size: 105 students (upper school)
- Student to teacher ratio: 11:1
- Campuses: 2
- Campus type: Urban
- Colors: Red, navy and white
- Athletics: 22 varsity, 15 junior varsity
- Athletics conference: Crossroads
- Mascot: Raider (Viking)
- Website: pembrokehill.org

The Pembroke Hill School (usually referred to as Pembroke Hill) is a private secular preparatory school for about 1,200 students in early years (age 2 years) through high school, separated into four sections: early years and prekindergarten (early childhood school), kindergarten through 5th grade (lower school), 6th through 8th grade (middle school), and 9th through 12th grade (upper school). It is located on two campuses a mile apart in the Country Club District of Kansas City, Missouri, near the Country Club Plaza.

== History ==
Pembroke Hill's history is from four predecessor schools:

- Country Day School (1910-1933)
- Pembroke School (1925 - 1933)
- Pembroke-Country Day School (1933 - 1985)
- Sunset Hill School (1913 - 1985)
- Pembroke Hill (1985 - Present)

=== Country Day School (1910 - 1933) ===
Boys School founded in 1910 with the first graduating class in 1914. The last graduating class of the Country Day School (all boys) was in 1933.

Vassie James Ward Hill, a Kansas Citian and Vassar College graduate born in 1875, inherited a fortune upon the death of her first husband, Hugh Ward, a son of pioneer Seth E. Ward. She then married Albert Ross Hill, formerly president of the University of Missouri.

At the time, Kansas City's wealthy commonly sent their children to boarding schools on the East Coast. Hill did not want to send her daughter and three sons "back east." She believed they should have equal access to education in Kansas City. This led her to research the workings of college preparatory schools, especially the progressive education of the Country Day School movement.

In 1910, using funds solicited from 12 Kansas City businesspeople, Hill founded the Country Day School for boys, which accepted both day students and boarders (boarding ceased in the 1950s). On Wednesday, September 28, 1910 the new school conducted opening exercises ay the old Wornall House at Sixty0first and Wornall Road. The initial enrollment was 17 boys and three faculty - the headmaster Mr. Hoffman, Grosvenor Buck and Arthur Doe. In the course of the year 5 new students joined. The school grew to 52 within three years. The school was forced to move to a new location when the Wornall heirs exercised their option to repurchase the family homestead. The school erected a structure, looking like a house, at 420 West 57th Street which they maintained until they purchased the 22 acres from the Ward Investment Company of the proerpty where today Pembroke Hill's Ward Parkway Campus, to the west of the Country Club Plaza at 5121 State Line Road.

=== Sunset Hill School (1913 - 1985) ===
Girls school founded in 1913 with the first graduating class in 1920. Last graduating class of all girls was in 1985.

Three years later, Ruth Carr Patton and Frances Matteson Bowersock joined with Hill to found the Sunset Hill School at 400 West 51st Street, named after Hill's favorite area on the Vassar campus (Sunset Hill is above Sunset Lake at Vassar). Sunset Hill was located on what is now Pembroke Hill's Wornall Campus, south of Country Club Plaza. At the time of its founding, the campus overlooked the Kansas City Country Club (today Loose Park). It also includes a portion of the Battle of Westport battlefield.

=== Pembroke School ===
In the Fall of 1925, some educators and students left the Country Day School to form the Pembroke School for boys at 7444 State Line Road (about 23 blocks south of the Country Day School). The school was adjacent to Lincoln and Lee University, which opened 1927. An advertisement for Pembroke noted it was "modeled after the finest English boarding schools." Two major schools in England (Oxford and Cambridge) have the Pembroke name because of their connection to the Earl of Pembroke.

==== Knute Rockne ====
Notre Dame Coach Knute Rockne was killed in a plane crash on March 31, 1931, flying from Kansas City where he had planned to visit his sons Billy and Knute Jr., who were boarding at Pembroke. Rockne made several unpublicized visits to the school, including a 1930 graduation speech. He was to be a speaker at the school's father-son banquet. Knute Jr. was captain of the Pembroke football team, which had played the Country Day school in 1930 in a high-profile game played at the University of Kansas Stadium. Rockne was quoted as saying he intended "to steal that play" when watching his son practice.

=== Pemboke-Country Day School ===
The two schools re-merged in 1933 to form the Pembroke-Country Day School (usually called "Pem Day"), keeping the Country Day School's original campus. In 1933, Lincoln and Lee, which was renamed the University of Kansas City, moved to what is today the campus of the University of Missouri–Kansas City.

=== Pembroke Hill School ===
From the start, Sunset Hill and Pembroke-Country Day worked cooperatively. Often, teachers taught at both schools. For generations, many Kansas City families would send their boys to Pem-Day and their girls to Sunset Hill. School activities, such as plays and dances, were often combined, and Sunset Hill girls were cheerleaders for Pem Day's athletic teams. In 1963, the schools began coeducational classes in upper-level math, science, and languages.

In the early 1980s, the two schools began merger discussions, ultimately merging in 1984 to become the Pembroke Hill School. The class of 1985 elected to have separate graduation ceremonies. True coeducation started the following year. The former Sunset Hill campus became home to the primary and lower schools (then preschool through 6th grade), and the former Pem Day campus became home to the middle and upper schools (then 7th grade through 12th grade). The two campuses are about a mile apart in the Country Club District, with the upper grades in a campus on the west, on the Missouri side of the Kansas border at 5121 State Line Road, and the lower grades a mile due east at 400 West 51st Street at Wornall Road.

In the late 1990s and early 2000s, Pembroke Hill completed a $50 million capital improvement project, which renovated both campuses. The Ward Parkway campus gained a new middle school building, Boocock Middle School (which now serves 6th-8th grades), a new upper school building, Jordan Hall, a new arts center, and a new library, the James M. Kemper Sr. Library.

In the Class of 2013, 29 seniors were recognized by the National Merit. Of these 29, 21 or 21% of the class, are National Merit Semifinalists.

On September 7, 2017, Dr. Steve Bellis announced that the 2018–2019 school year would be his last as Head of School. Bellis was headmaster of the Ward Parkway Campus of The Pembroke Hill School for sixteen years. Upon his departure, Brad Shelley became head of school.

== Incidents ==
In 1988, Kansas City Magazine published an article titled "A High School on Easy Street", criticizing Pembroke Hill's students' allegedly "advantaged way of life."

According to The Kansas City Star, students at Pembroke Hill have "faced several incidents of anti-Semitic behavior at Pembroke." On the 2021 International Holocaust Remembrance Day in January, a swastika was discovered on a student's desk. The symbol was accompanied by an offensive reference toward members of the school's LGBT community. The incident was covered by citywide media and contextualized by prior incidents where one student raised his arm in a Nazi salute while calling a Jewish student an offensive name. Swastikas were painted on a Jewish student's locker. Several Jewish parents spoke to The Star on the condition of anonymity, fearing reprisals against their children. Following the incident, officials initiated a hiring search for the newly created position of Director of Diversity, Equity, and Inclusion.

In April 2021, months after a swastika was discovered in a classroom, school officials found "KKK" written on the side of a desk. School officials hired consulting firm Sophic Solutions to "hold community conversations, complete a diversity and equity audit, and then present recommendations."

== Accreditation ==
Pembroke Hill is accredited by the Independent Schools Association of the Central States (ISACS) and the National Association for the Education of Young Children. The school is a member of the National Association of Independent Schools (NAIS).

== Athletics ==
Pembroke Hill colors are blue and red, its teams are known as the Raiders, and its mascot resembles a Viking raider. Pembroke is a member of the Crossroads Conference.

=== Championships ===
The boys basketball team won two Missouri State basketball championships in 1956 and 1957, operating under the Pembroke County Day name. In 1997, 1998, and 1999, Pembroke Hill's boys' basketball team won the Missouri Class 2A state title. In 2000, however, in a nationally publicized scandal, the Missouri State High School Activities Association stripped Pembroke of the titles and placed the school on probation after the Kansas City Star revealed that promoter and AAU coach Myron Piggie had remitted cash payments to two of the school's star players, Kareem Rush and his brother JaRon Rush, to play on his "amateur" basketball team. Piggie admitted to paying JaRon Rush $17,000 and Kareem Rush $2,300, after which the brothers "submitted false and fraudulent Student Athlete Statements to the universities where they were to play intercollegiate basketball", certifying that they had not been paid to play basketball. As a result, the University of California, Los Angeles and the University of Missouri found themselves subject to NCAA penalties for awarding athletic scholarships to non-amateurs. On Piggie's 2002 appeal from his prison sentence and restitution for conspiracy to commit wire fraud, mail fraud, and tax evasion, the United States Court of Appeals for the Eighth Circuit found that Pembroke Hill had "sustained a loss of $10,733.89 in investigative costs and forfeiture of property as a result of" Piggie's conspiracy.

Pembroke Hill Raiders athletics logo

The girls' basketball team won four Missouri State basketball championships in 1995, 1999, 2005, and 2006.

The Raiders lacrosse team won the 2009 Division II state championship, beating Eureka High School 6-5 after trailing 5–2 in the 4th quarter.

The boys' tennis team also won the 2009 Division II state championship, sweeping all teams up until the final, where Pembroke won 5–2.

In 2017, the Raiders won state tennis tournaments in both the boys and girls class 1 sections. The boys defeated The Saint Louis Priory School 5–2 in the finals, while the girls upended the defending champion John Burroughs School 5–4 in October.

In 2021, boys' golf member Ryan Lee won the Missouri golf championships for the second time in his high school career. Lee set a state record for the lowest two-day score, firing a total score of 133 (67,66).

=== Rivalries ===
Pembroke Hill has cross-state athletic rivalries with two schools located in the suburbs of St. Louis: MICDS and John Burroughs School, both in Ladue, Missouri. The Raiders' biggest rivals in the Kansas City area are fellow private schools in The Barstow School and Rockhurst High School. Pembroke Hill also has a rivalry in football with St. Pius X located in the northland of Kansas City.

=== Sports offered ===
For girls, Pembroke Hill offers:

Fall	Winter	Spring
Cheerleading (V)	Basketball (6, 7, 8, 9, JV, V)	Soccer (6, 7, 8, JV/V)
Cross Country (7/8, JV, V)	Cheerleading (V)	Lacrosse (JV/V)
Field hockey (6, 7/8, C, JV, V)	Dance team	Track and field (6, 7/8, JV, V)
Golf (JV, V)	Swimming (JV, V)	
Tennis (JV, V)		
Volleyball (6, 7, 8, JV, V)		

For boys, Pembroke Hill offers:

Fall	Winter	Spring
Cross Country (7/8, JV, V)	Basketball (8, 9, JV, V)	Baseball (JV/V)
Football (7/8, JV, V)	Wrestling (7/8, JV, V)	Golf (JV/V
Soccer (JV, V)		Lacrosse (JV/V)
Swimming (JV, V)		Tennis (JV, V)
Cheerleading (V)		Track and field (7/8, JV, V)

== Notable alumni and staff ==
=== Government and politics ===
- D. Brook Bartlett, class of 1955; District Judge, United States District Court for the Western District of Missouri (1981–2000), appointed by President Ronald Reagan
- Richard L. Berkley, class of 1949; 52nd Mayor of Kansas City, Missouri (1979–91)
- Bruce Forrester, class of 1928; judge, United States Tax Court (1957–78), appointed by President Dwight D. Eisenhower
- John W. Lungstrum, class of 1963; District Judge, United States District Court for the District of Kansas (1991–), appointed by President George H. W. Bush
- Karen McCarthy, English teacher, Sunset Hill School (1969–76); state representative, Missouri House of Representatives (1977–95); Missouri's 5th congressional district representative, United States House of Representatives (1995–2005)
- Charles H. Price II, class of 1948; Ambassador of the United States to Belgium (1981–83) and to the United Kingdom (1983–89), appointed by President Ronald Reagan
- Shombi Sharp, class of 1988; United Nations Resident Coordinator (Ambassador), Armenia (2018–present), appointed by UN Secretary-General António Guterres

=== Media and the arts ===
- Richard Armstrong, class of 1967; Director of the Solomon R. Guggenheim Museum
- Elizabeth Craft, class of 1989; writer for the television series Angel and The Shield; co-producer of The Shield
- John Kander, class of 1944; Tony Award-winning and Academy Award-nominated Broadway theatre composer; musicals include Chicago, Cabaret, and Fosse; songs include Theme from New York, New York; films include Cabaret and Chicago
- Frederick R. Koch, attended, billionaire collector and philanthropist
- Matt Leisy, class of 1999; Broadway theatre and film actor
- John Stewart Muller, class of 1995; motion picture and television commercial director, writer and producer; credits include Fling, Indiscretion
- David Owen, class of 1973; author; staff writer for The New Yorker and contributing editor of Golf Digest
- Gretchen Craft Rubin, class of 1984; author, The Happiness Project, Happier at Home and Better Than Before and hosts popular podcast "Happier With Gretchen Rubin"
- Devo Springsteen (Devon Harris), class of 1995; Grammy Award-winning producer and songwriter
- Whitney Terrell, class of 1986; author; credits include The Huntsman, named to the New York Times "notable" list in 2001
- Aaron Rahsaan Thomas, class of 1995; Emmy Award-nominated producer and screenwriter; credits include episodes for Friday Night Lights, Numb3rs, and CSI: NY

=== Science and technology ===
- Betty Eisner, class of 1933; pioneer in LSD research
- Ralph Hoffmann, headmaster, Country Day School (1910–19); natural history teacher and amateur ornithologist and botanist; authored first true bird field guide
- Ruth Patrick, class of 1925; botanist and limnologist at the University of Virginia specializing in diatoms and freshwater ecology
- Kathryn Stephenson, class of 1930; first female American board-certified plastic surgeon

=== Education ===
- Dean C. Allard, class of 1951; historian; director, United States Naval Historical Center (1989–95)
- Ian Ayres, class of 1977; William K. Townsend Professor at the Yale Law School and professor at the Yale School of Management
- Catherine Clinton, class of 1969; Professor of History at Queen's University Belfast
- Joan Dillon, history teacher, Sunset Hill School (1962–71); historic preservation activist
- Jay Lorsch, class of 1950; Louis Kirstein Professor of Human Relations at the Harvard Business School
- Samuel Williston Professor of Law at the Harvard Law School
- Franklin David Murphy, class of 1932; chancellor, University of Kansas (1951–60), University of California, Los Angeles (1960–68); chairman and CEO, Times Mirror Company (1968–80)

=== Business ===
- Stanley Durwood, class of 1938; founder of AMC Theatres; invented the multiplex
- Donald J. Hall Sr., class of 1946; chairman, Hallmark Cards (1966–2024); president and CEO, Hallmark Cards (1966–1986)
- Donald J. Hall Jr., class of 1974; president and CEO, Hallmark Cards (2002-); son of Hallmark Cards chairman Donald J. Hall Sr.
- Jay W. Jordan II, class of 1965; founder, The Jordan Company
- Jen Kao, class of 1999; fashion designer; daughter of Garmin co-founder Min Kao

=== Sports ===
- Nitin Dhiman, physician and former college basketball player and professional ABA player for the San Diego Wildcats
- Tiffani McReynolds (born 1991), American hurdler
- JaRon Rush, class of 1998; McDonald's All-American Team college basketball player, UCLA Bruins; professional ABA and NBA Development League player, brother of basketball players Kareem Rush and Brandon Rush
- Kareem Rush, class of 1999; college basketball player, Missouri Tigers; professional NBA, NBA Development League, and ABA shooting guard, brother of basketball players JaRon Rush and Brandon Rush
- Bill Wakefield, class of 1959; professional Major League Baseball pitcher, New York Mets (1964)
- Tom Watson, class of 1967; professional golfer; won Masters Tournament (1977, 1981), the U.S. Open (1981), and the British Open (1975, 1977, 1980, 1982, 1983)
- John Windsor, class of 1958; college basketball player, Stanford Indians (1959–63); professional NBA player, San Francisco Warriors (1963–64)

==== Other notable alumni ====
- Clayton Custer (attended); former Loyola Chicago basketball standout and current Director of Video Operations and Player Development at the University of Oklahoma
- Masten Gregory (attended); Formula One driver and 24 Hours of Le Mans winner
