= Jim Leisy =

American photographer

Jim Leisy Jr. (1950–2014) was an artist, photographer, book editor and publisher.

He was born in Dallas, Texas in 1950. He attended both Bethel College and Stanford University, and earned a BA (history major/art minor) from Bethel College. He was editor of the Bethel Collegian.

In 1972 he joined the University of Chicago Press as a photographer. He also worked as a freelance photographer and art editor for the Chicago Review. After two years he left University of Chicago Press to become a field representative and field editor for Addison-Wesley Publishing Company, based in Philadelphia. In 1977, he was hired to acquire and edit college textbooks in chemistry and computer science for Brooks/Cole Publishing Company (Monterey CA). In 1978, the company was acquired by International Thomson. He rose through the executive ranks at Thomson and became a vice-president of a company that specialized in publishing for information technology.

In 1985, he left the Thomson Corporation to found Franklin, Beedle & Associates to publish college-level textbooks in computer science and information technology.

Through Franklin, Beedle & Associates he edited and published numerous textbooks that include: Carolyn Gillay's (Saddleback College) over 20 books on Microsoft DOS and Windows; Ernest Ackermann and Karen Hartman's (University of Mary Washington/USA State Department) textbooks on the use of the Internet; John Zelle's (Wartburg College) Python-based computer science 1 textbook; Paul Brians' (Washington State University) Common Errors in English Usage; and Mark Liberman (University of Pennsylvania) and Geoffrey K. Pullum's (UCSC) Far from the Madding Gerund. Publications from his companies have earned numerous achievement awards and have been featured on Air America Radio, NPR, The Progressive, The New York Times, CNN, MSNBC, and nearly all major US newspapers.

He was active in publishing and photography through his companies: Franklin, Beedle & Associates; William, James & Company; and Digitopia. In addition he was a member of the board of directors for the Portland Art Museum Photography Council. He was also staff photographer for Chamber Music Northwest, which has strong ties with the Chamber Music Society of Lincoln Center. His photographs have been published by The Oregonian, NPR, Poetry Review, Diffusion annual, and the Oregon Cultural Trust, and are in private collections and museums.

Leisy died of a heart attack shortly after visiting China to exhibit his work at the 2013 Lishui Photography Festival.
