= 2001–02 ABA season =

- League: American Basketball Association
- Sport: Basketball
- Duration: November 2001 – March 2002

Regular season
- Season MVP: Pete Mickeal, (Kansas City Knights)

2002 ABA Playoffs
- champions: Southern California Surf
- runners-up: Phoenix Eclipse
- champions: Kansas City Knights
- runners-up: Las Vegas Slam

2002 ABA Championship
- Champions: Kansas City Knights
- Runners-up: Southern California Surf
- Finals MVP: Pete Mickeal

ABA seasons
- ← 2000–01 2003–04 →

The 2001–02 ABA season was the second season of the American Basketball Association. The regular season started in November 2001 and the year ended with the championship game in March 2002 featuring the Kansas City Knights and Southern California Surf. Kansas City defeated Southern California, 118–113 in the championship game to win their first ABA title.

Following the season, the league took a year off for reorganization. Play was picked up in the 2003-04 ABA season.

== Regular season standings ==
| Team | W | L | Win % |
|---|---|---|---|
| Kansas City Knights | 35 | 5 | .865 |
| Southern California Surf | 23 | 14 | .622 |
| Phoenix Eclipse | 19 | 15 | .559 |
| Detroit Dogs | 11 | 17 | .393 |
| Kentucky Pro Cats | 12 | 21 | .363 |
| Indiana Legends | 10 | 22 | .313 |
| Las Vegas Slam | 7 | 20 | .259 |

== Postseason Results ==
Semifinals
2 | Southern California Surf | 124
5 | Kentucky Pro Cats | 111
3 | Phoenix Eclipse | 112
4 | Detroit Dogs | 97
1 | Kansas City Knights | bye
6 | Indiana Legends | 94
7 | Las Vegas Slam | 115

Finals
2 | Southern California Surf | 93
3 | Phoenix Eclipse | 90
1 | Kansas City Knights | 110
7 | Las Vegas Slam | 101

ABA Championship
2 | Southern California Surf | 113
1 | Kansas City Knights | 118
