= 2000–01 ABA season =

- League: American Basketball Association
- Sport: Basketball
- Duration: November 2000 – March 2001

Regular season
- Season MVP: None announced

2001 ABA Playoffs
- champions: Detroit Dogs
- runners-up: Indiana Legends
- champions: Chicago Skyliners
- runners-up: Kansas City Knights

2001 ABA Championship
- Champions: Detroit Dogs
- Runners-up: Chicago Skyliners
- Finals MVP: Gee Girvin, Ndongo N'Diaye (Detroit Dogs)

ABA seasons
- 2001–02 →

The 2000–01 ABA season was the first season of the new American Basketball Association. The season lasted from November 2000 to the championship game in March 2001 featuring the top seeded Chicago Skyliners and the fourth-seeded Detroit Dogs. Detroit defeated Chicago, 107–91 in the 2001 ABA championship game.

== Salaries ==
Each roster had a limit of 10 players and salary cap of $900,000, Most of ABA 2000 players were paid higher than a CBA or International Basketball League player. The average salary was around $60,000 (NBA minimum in 2000-01 was of $316,969 and the salary cap was $35.5 million).

== Regular season standings ==
East	W	L	Win %
Detroit Dogs	24	20	.545
Memphis Houn'Dawgs	19	22	.463
Indiana Legends	18	24	.429
Tampa Bay ThunderDawgs	15	26	.366
West	W	L	Win %
Chicago Skyliners	31	12	.721
Los Angeles Stars	28	13	.683
Kansas City Knights	24	17	.585
San Diego Wildfire	8	33	.195

== Postseason Results ==
Division Semifinals
1E	Detroit Dogs	117
4E	Tampa Bay ThunderDawgs	112
2E	Memphis Houn'Dawgs	90
3E	Indiana Legends	95
1W	Chicago Skyliners	112
4W	San Diego Wildfire	97
2W	Los Angeles Stars	112
3W	Kansas City Knights	132

Division Finals
1E	Detroit Dogs	119
3E	Indiana Legends	105
1W	Chicago Skyliners	106
3W	Kansas City Knights	105

ABA Championship
1E	Detroit Dogs	107
1W	Chicago Skyliners	91

== 2001 ABA Final rosters ==
=== Detroit Dogs ===
Head Coach: George Gervin

#	Nt.	Pos.	Ht.	Player	Year of birth	Previous club
	(United States)	SG	6'2	Gee Gervin	1976
	(United States)	SG	6'5	Derrick Hayes	1974
	(United States)			Saddi Washington	1975	Western Michigan Broncos
	(United States)	SG	6'1	Ryan Hoover	1974
	(United States)	SF	6'8	Derrick Gervin	1963	None
	(United States)	SF	6'9	Sean Higgins	1968	Ural Great Perm
	(United States)	C	7'0	Anthony Pelle	1972	Florida Sea Dragons (USBL)
	(United States)	C	7'0	Benoit Benjamin	1964	Criollos de Caguas
	(Senegal)	C	7'0	Ndongo N'Diaye	1877	Primeiro de Agosto
