= Matt Leisy =

British-American actor

- Born: Boston, Massachusetts, US
- Education: Northwestern University
- Occupation: Actor
- Website: mattleisy.com

Matthew Rhys "Matt" Leisy is a British-American theatre, television, and film actor.

== Biography and training ==
Matt Leisy was born in Boston, Massachusetts. He grew up in Surrey, England. He attended the American Boychoir School and high school at The Pembroke Hill School in Kansas City, Missouri.

Leisy graduated from Northwestern University.

== Career ==
His film credits include The Friend, Super Happy Fun Clown, Life Interrupted, Tell, Man From the Dying Planet, Shooting Script, and The Good Shepherd.

His television credits include The Blacklist on NBC, Live from Lincoln Center on PBS and Impossible Escapes on Curiosity Stream.

His theatre credits include Raoul, Vicomte de Chagny in the World Tour of The Phantom of the Opera, The Light in the Piazza with New York City Center Encores!, the Lucille Lortel Award-winning Sweeney Todd: The Demon Barber of Fleet Street as Beadle Bamford and the standby for Anthony Hope and Tobias Ragg at the Barrow Street Theatre and the Broadway First National Tour of the Tony Award-winning musical A Gentleman's Guide to Love and Murder. Other career highlights include the regional premiere of The Inheritance (play), Mr. Bingley in Pride and Prejudice at Cincinnati Playhouse in the Park, Algernon in The Importance of Being Earnest at Arizona Theatre Company, Ken in John Logan's Red at the Clarence Brown Theatre, Richard Hannay in The 39 Steps, Younger Brother in Ragtime, and Leonard Vole in Witness for the Prosecution at Bristol Riverside Theatre, Scripps in Alan Bennett's The History Boys at The Repertory Theatre of St. Louis and the Arden Theatre Company, and Young Scrooge in A Christmas Carol at the Alabama Shakespeare Festival.

He made his solo concert debut at Helzberg Hall of the Kauffman Center for the Performing Arts in November 2021.

Matt Leisy opened for Gladys Knight in November 2023 at Kauffman Center for the Performing Arts

Leisy starred in the Off-Broadway production of The Fantasticks in the role of Matt.

Leisy currently resides in New York City.

== Awards and nominations ==
Leisy was nominated for the Barrymore Awards for Excellence in Theater for The History Boys at the Arden Theatre.

Leisy received an honorable mention for Outstanding Supporting Actor for his role in Ghostlight at the New York Musical Theatre Festival.

Leisy received a Great Performance of 2011 honor for his portrayal of Matt in The Fantasticks.
