= 2004–05 ABA season =

- League: American Basketball Association
- Sport: Basketball
- Duration: November 2004 – March 2005

Regular season
- Season MVP: Kareem Reid, Arkansas RimRockers

2005 ABA Playoffs
- champions: Bellevue Blackhawks
- runners-up: Utah Snowbears
- champions: Arkansas RimRockers
- runners-up: Mississippi Stingers

2005 ABA Championship
- Champions: Arkansas RimRockers
- Runners-up: Bellevue Blackhawks
- Finals MVP: Kareem Reid, Arkansas RimRockers

ABA seasons
- ← 2003–04 2005–06 →

The 2004–05 ABA season was the fourth season of the American Basketball Association. The regular season started in November 2004 and the year ended with the championship game in March 2005 featuring the Arkansas RimRockers and Bellevue Blackhawks. Arkansas defeated Bellevue, 118–103 in the championship game to win their first ABA title.

== Regular season standings ==
Red Division	W	L	Win %
Utah Snowbears	25	1	.962
Long Beach Jam	18	10	.643
Las Vegas Rattlers	9	6	.600
Los Angeles Stars	13	12	.520
Ontario Warriors	15	14	.517
Orange County Buzz	10	10	.500
Bellevue Blackhawks	10	16	.385
Tijuana Dragons	10	16	.385
Calgary Drillers	5	10	.333
Portland Reign	4	8	.333
Fresno Heatwave	4	9	.308
Central Valley Dawgs	3	20	.130
White Division	W	L	Win %
Arkansas RimRockers	28	5	.848
Kansas City Knights	17	8	.680
Texas Tycoons	17	9	.654
Kentucky Colonels	16	11	.593
Cincinnati Monarchs	7	7	.500
Detroit Wheels	4	8	.333
St. Louis Flight	9	19	.321
Colorado Storm	3	13	.188
Louisiana Cajun Pelicans	2	10	.167
Hermosillo Seris	3	6	.333
Chicago Soldiers	1	2	.333
Oklahoma City Ballhawgs	0	1	.000
Juarez Gallos	0	0	.000
Blue Division	W	L	Win %
Mississippi Stingers	20	3	.870
Harlem Strong Dogs	14	6	.700
Nashville Rhythm	18	10	.643
Maryland Nighthawks	15	9	.625
New Jersey SkyCats	12	9	.571
Pennsylvania Pit Bulls	8	9	.471
Carolina Thunder	9	14	.391
Atlanta Vision	5	13	.278
Boston Frenzy	5	15	.250
Reigning Knights of Georgia	2	16	.111
Jacksonville Wave	2	1	.667
Philadelphia Fusion	3	10	.300

== Playoff Results ==
Quarterfinals
1	Utah Snowbears	130
14	Tijuana Dragons	115
8	Long Beach Jam	148
9	Las Vegas Rattlers	126
5	Maryland Nighthawks	124
12	New Jersey SkyCats	105
4	Texas Tycoons	94
13	Bellevue Blackhawks	101
3	Mississippi Stingers	96
16	St. Louis Flight	84
6	Kansas City Knights	119
11	Los Angeles Stars	111
7	Harlem Strong Dogs	105
10	Kentucky Colonels	108
2	Arkansas RimRockers	136
15	Ontario Warriors	97

Semifinals
1	Utah Snowbears	130
8	Long Beach Jam	115
5	Maryland Nighthawks	120
13	Bellevue Blackhawks	133
3	Mississippi Stingers	114
6	Kansas City Knights	109
10	Kentucky Colonels	123
2	Arkansas RimRockers	135

Finals
1	Utah Snowbears	forfeit
13	Bellevue Blackhawks	-
3	Mississippi Stingers	105
2	Arkansas RimRockers	117

ABA Championship
13	Bellevue Blackhawks	103
2	Arkansas RimRockers	118
