= Florida Sea Dragons =

- League: United States Basketball League
- Founded: 2000
- Dissolved: 2003
- History: Tampa Bay Windjammers 1996–99; Florida Sea Dragons 2000-2003
- Arena: TECO Arena
- Location: Fort Myers, Florida
- Team colors: Green, Gold, White
- Head coach: Rick Barry (NBA HOF)

The Florida Sea Dragons was an American professional basketball team based in Fort Myers, Florida. The club competed in the now defunct United States Basketball League. The Sea Dragons played from 2000 to 2003 at TECO Arena in Estero, Florida.

== Seasons ==
Stagione	League	Name	W	L	%	Place	Play-off	Coach
1996	USBL	Tampa Bay Windjammers	17	12	58,6	2º	Semifinals	Butch van Breda Kolff
1997	USBL	Tampa Bay Windjammers	9	17	34,6	5º	Quarter finals	
1998	USBL	Tampa Bay Windjammers	8	18	30,8	4º	First round	
1999	USBL	Tampa Bay Windjammers	11	16	40,7	4º	-	Darren Morningstar
2000	USBL	Florida Sea Dragons	16	14	53,3	3º	Quarter finals	Rick Barry
2001	USBL	Florida Sea Dragons	18	12	60,0	3º	Quarter finals	
2002	USBL	Florida Sea Dragons	10	20	33,3	4º	-	

== Home arenas ==
Tampa Bay Windjammers

- Bayfront Arena, cap: 6,400 (St. Petersburg, Florida) 1996–98
- Clearwater Central Catholic (St. Petersburg, Florida) 1999

Florida Sea Dragons

- TECO Arena, cap: 7,000 (Estero, Florida) 2000–2003

== See also ==
- Miami Majesty
- Florida Sharks
