= Universidad Iberoamericana (UNIBE) =

Private university in the Dominican Republic

Universidad Iberoamericana (UNIBE) is a private nonprofit coeducational university in Santo Domingo, Dominican Republic, that was founded in 1982 as a result of the initiative of the Iberoamerican-Cooperation Institute and a Steering Committee in the Dominican Republic. The document was signed on January 12, 1982, at a ceremony held at the Embassy of Spain.

== History ==
The university began with self-effort of the Dominican authorities, and the main causes behind its foundation can be expressed as follows: the V Centenary of the Cultural Encounter between Spain and the American people, the desire to strengthen Hispanic ties between the American countries and Spain, as well as offering an answer to the educational needs of the country, as an institution of high academic quality and highly formative.

It acquired its legal status by Decree No. 3371 of July 12, 1982. UNIBE academic life began on September 1, 1983, offering degrees in law, engineering, and medicine. The following year, additional programs opened that included architecture, business administration, and by May 1985, the dentistry program, which attracted a large cohort of students from Spain due to the facilities and the quality of education offered in this field. UNIBE's doctor of dentistry program is still considered among the best in the regions.

In 1986, UNIBE began offering the first post-graduate level specialization: School Health and Insurance. In August 2004, during the celebration in the Fifth Ordinary Session of the National Council of Higher Education, Science, and Technology (CONESCYT) approved by Resolution 31–2004, UNIBE was granted full autonomy.

Through the years, UNIBE expanded its offerings in other areas. It currently has psychology, education, hospitality management, industrial engineering, and over 30 graduate programs. It has an enrollment of more than 3,000 students and 15,000 alumni.

UNIBE has been the best ranked university in the Dominican Republic since 2018.

== Offerings ==
The university offers the following degree undergraduate programs:

- Liberal arts
- Business Management and Administration
- BBA in International Business
- Tourism Management and Administration
- Marketing
- Architecture
- Communication
- Interior Design
- Medicine
- Dentistry
- Psychology (Clinical, School, and Industrial/Organizational)
- Education
- Engineering (Civil, Industrial, ICT)
- Law

UNIBE has several graduate programs in: Education, Psychology, Economics, Law, Business, Medicine, Design, and Dentistry.

UNIBE offers several minors across degree programs, among these are a research minor and a minor in neurosciences.

In 2021, UNIBE launched an adult learning program for mid career professionals in Business Administration, Law, and Psychology.

The university also has a continuing and continuing medical education department.

== Student services and campus facilities ==
UNIBE's campus is located in the historic Gascue neighborhood in the city of Santo Domingo. The main building is the former home of Dominican intellectual Manuel Arturo Peña Battle. The rest of the campus consists of modern buildings that surround the historic home.

The campus hosts several food courts, banks, stores, a copy center, among other facilities. A library and gymnasium are also available for students, faculty, and staff.

UNIBE provides several services on campus to students including advisement and counseling, and extracurricular programming in sports and the arts. UNIBE departments also host several student organizations and special interest groups. Students and faculty also have access to Unibe's Entrepreneurship and Innovation Center .

== Research areas and facilities ==
- Institute for Tropical Medicine and Global Health : also hosts a molecular biology laboratory accredited by the Ministry of Health
- Center for Biomaterials and Dentistry Research
- Neurocognition and Psychophysiology Laboratory
- Green Roofs Laboratory
- Center for Behavioral Intervention Studies
- Ethics Committee (IRB)

== Notable faculty and alumni ==
- Raquel Arbaje (Alumni), First Lady of the Dominican Republic since 2020
- Víctor Bisonó (Alumni)
- Nitin Dhiman (Alumni)
- Yamilet Peña (Alumni)
- Lourdes Stephen (Alumni)
