= 2003–04 ABA season =

- League: American Basketball Association
- Sport: Basketball
- Duration: November 2003 – March 2004

Regular season
- Season MVP: Joe Crispin, Kansas City Knights

2004 ABA Playoffs
- champions: Kansas City Knights
- runners-up: Juarez Gallos
- champions: Long Beach Jam
- runners-up: none

2004 ABA Championship
- Champions: Long Beach Jam
- Runners-up: Kansas City Knights

ABA seasons
- ← 2001–02 2004–05 →

The 2003–04 ABA season was the third season of the American Basketball Association, and the first season since the league took a year off in 2002 for reorganization. The regular season started in November 2003 and the year ended with the championship game in March 2004 featuring the Long Beach Jam and Kansas City Knights. Long Beach led by Dennis Rodman defeated Kansas City, 126–123 in the championship game to win their first ABA title.

== Regular season standings ==
Team	W	L	Win %
Long Beach Jam	24	7	.774
Kansas City Knights	23	9	.719
Juarez Gallos	18	12	.600
Fresno Heatwave	13	16	.448
Tijuana Dragons	12	18	.400
Las Vegas Rattlers	10	18	.357
Jersey Squires	3	23	.115

== Playoff Results ==
Semifinals
2	Kansas City Knights	101
7	Jersey Squires	91
3	Juarez Gallos	133
6	Tijuana Dragons	120

Finals
2	Kansas City Knights	100
3	Juarez Gallos	99
1	Long Beach Jam	bye

ABA Championship
2	Kansas City Knights	123
1	Long Beach Jam	126
