= Kansas City Knights =

American minor league basketball team (2000–2004)

- League: ABA; 2000–04
- Founded: 2000
- Dissolved: 2004
- Arena: Kemper Arena; Hale Arena
- Location: Kansas City, Missouri
- Team colors: purple, silver, white, black
- Ownership: Jim Clark
- Championships: 1 (2001–02)
- Website: knightsfans.com (archived on September 6, 2004)

The Kansas City Knights were an American Basketball Association minor league basketball team based in Kansas City, Missouri. They have not played since the 2004–05 season.

== Franchise history ==
The Knights were one of the ABA's charter franchises and began play during the 2000–01 season. In 2001–02, the following season, the Knights posted a league best 35–5 record that year and ended up winning the ABA championship under head coach and University of Kansas alumnus Kevin Pritchard.

Soon after winning the title, the ABA took the year off to re-organize. The ABA then resumed play in the 2003–2004 season. The Knights competed in the ABA for the 2003–04 and the 2004-05 seasons before going dark for 2005–06. It was announced via a press release on the team's website that the team would suspend operations until a suburban arena was built in Johnson County, KS. The team intended to play at an interim location once ground was broken on the new arena, but plans for the arena remain in limbo and there has been no word from the team's owners since. However, operation of the youth developmental "Knights Academy" program continued for some time after the team shuttered.

Since the Knights folded, several ABA teams have appeared and disappeared in the Kansas City area. None of these teams are related to the Knights or have been as successful. The most recent ABA team in the Kansas City area was the Kansas City Soul, who folded in 2014.

| Season | Record | Result |
|---|---|---|
| 2000–2001 | 24-17 (.585) | |
| 2001–2002 | 35-5 (.865) | Champions |
| 2002–2003 | ABA suspended operations | |
| 2003–2004 | 23-9 (.719) | |
| 2004–2005 | 17-8 (.680) | |
| 2005–2006 | Took Year Off | |
| Overall | 99-39 (.717) | |

== Players of note ==
- Jeff Boschee
- Nick Bradford
- Ernest Brown
- Antoine Carr
- Maurice Carter
- Joe Crispin
- Eddie Gill
- Anthony Goldwire
- Jeff Graves
- Derek Grimm
- Darrin Hancock
- Derek Hood
- Rick Hughes
- Dan McClintock
- Pete Mickeal
- Doug Overton
- Jason Sasser
- Ryan Sears
- Paul Shirley
- Doug Smith
- David Vanterpool
- Rex Walters
