= 1998–99 Virginia Cavaliers men's basketball team =

American college basketball season

1998–99 Virginia Cavaliers men's basketball
- Conference: Atlantic Coast Conference
- Record: 14–16 (4–12 ACC)
- Head coach: Pete Gillen (1st season)
- Assistant coaches: Walt Fuller (1st season); Bobby Gonzalez (1st season); Tom Herrion (1st season)
- Home arena: University Hall

1998–99 ACC men's basketball standings
	Conf.				Overall
Team	W		L	PCT	W		L	PCT
No. 1 Duke †	16	–	0	1.000	37	–	2	.949
No. 5 Maryland	13	–	3	.813	28	–	6	.824
No. 13 North Carolina	10	–	6	.625	24	–	10	.706
Wake Forest	7	–	9	.438	17	–	14	.548
NC State	6	–	10	.375	19	–	14	.576
Georgia Tech	6	–	10	.375	15	–	16	.484
Clemson	5	–	11	.313	20	–	15	.571
Florida State	5	–	11	.313	13	–	17	.433
Virginia	4	–	12	.250	14	–	16	.467
† 1999 ACC tournament winner Rankings from AP Poll

The 1998–99 Virginia Cavaliers men's basketball team represented the University of Virginia during the 1998–99 NCAA Division I men's basketball season. The team was led by first-year head coach Pete Gillen, and played their home games at University Hall in Charlottesville, Virginia as members of the Atlantic Coast Conference.

== Last season ==
The Cavaliers had a record of 11–19 and finished last in the ACC at 3–13. Their season ended in a lopsided loss to the Duke Blue Devils 63–41 in the quarterfinals of the 1998 ACC Tournament.

== Roster ==
1998–99 Virginia Cavaliers men's basketball team
Players
Coaches

Pos.	#	Name	Height	Weight	Year	Previous school	Hometown
G	4	Cade Lemcke (W)	6 ft 6 in (1.98 m)	181 lb (82 kg)	Fr	McQuaid Jesuit HS	Hilton, New York
G/F	5	Brandon Lloyd (W)	6 ft 4 in (1.93 m)	184 lb (83 kg)	Fr	Lake Braddock Secondary	Springfield, Virginia
G	10	Chezley Watson	6 ft 2 in (1.88 m)	201 lb (91 kg)	So	East Hall HS	Gainesville, Georgia
G	11	Greg Lyons (W)	6 ft 4 in (1.93 m)	178 lb (81 kg)	So	Holy Cross HS	Mineola, New York
G	12	Keith Friel (I) (redshirt)	6 ft 4 in (1.93 m)	187 lb (85 kg)	Jr	Oyster River HS/Notre Dame	Durham, New Hampshire
G	13	Donald Hand (C)	5 ft 11 in (1.8 m)	176 lb (80 kg)	So	Paterson Catholic HS	Paterson, New Jersey
G/F	21	Jason Dowling (W)	6 ft 2 in (1.88 m)	191 lb (87 kg)	Fr	Xaverian HS	Brooklyn, New York
G	22	Josh Hare (W)	6 ft 2 in (1.88 m)	197 lb (89 kg)	So	Rockville HS	Vernon, Connecticut
G/F	24	Willie Dersch (C)	6 ft 6 in (1.98 m)	202 lb (92 kg)	Jr	Holy Cross HS	Floral Park, New York
F	25	Marcus Martin (W)	6 ft 5 in (1.96 m)	218 lb (99 kg)	Fr	Western Albemarle HS	Charlottesville, Virginia
G/F	31	Adam Hall	6 ft 5 in (1.96 m)	190 lb (86 kg)	Fr	Katy HS	Katy, Texas
G/F	33	Chris Williams	6 ft 6 in (1.98 m)	198 lb (90 kg)	Fr	Minor HS	Birmingham, Alabama
C	44	Kris Hunter	6 ft 11 in (2.11 m)	215 lb (98 kg)	Jr	Florida A&M HS	Tallahassee, Florida
F/C	52	Colin Ducharme (C)	6 ft 9 in (2.06 m)	243 lb (110 kg)	Jr	Douglas S. Freeman HS	Richmond, Virginia
F	55	Raleigh Harbour (W)	6 ft 8 in (2.03 m)	212 lb (96 kg)	Sr	Fenwick HS	Hinsdale, Illinois

Head coach

- Pete Gillen (Fairfield)

Assistant coach(es)

- Tom Herrion (Merrimack)
- Bobby Gonzalez (Buffalo State)
- Walt Fuller (Drexel)

Legend

- (C) Team captain
- (S) Suspended
- (I) Ineligible
- (W) Walk-on
- Injured
- Current redshirt

Roster
Last update: February 18, 2015

== Schedule ==
Date time, TV	Opponent	Result	Record	Site (attendance) city, state
Exhibition game
Nov. 3*; 7:30 pm, no	Aussie All-Stars	W 96–79		University Hall; Charlottesville, Virginia
Nov. 7*; 8:00 pm, no	California All-Stars	W 101–77		University Hall; Charlottesville, Virginia
Regular season
Nov. 13*; 6:00 pm, no	vs. VCU	W 86–70	1–0 (0–0)	Robins Center (6,412); Richmond, Virginia
Nov. 20*; 10:30 pm, no	vs. No. 19 Arkansas; Top of the World Challenge	L 83–85	1–1 (0–0)	Carlson Center (4,901); Fairbanks, AK
Nov. 21*; 6:45 pm, no	vs. Wisconsin; Top of the World Challenge	L 56–66	1–2 (0–0)	Carlson Center (2,744); Fairbanks, AK
Nov. 22*; 2:30 pm, no	vs. Washington State; Top of the World Challenge	W 62–53	2–2 (0–0)	Carlson Center; Fairbanks, AK
Nov. 25*; 6:00 pm, no	Hampton	W 116–66	3–2 (0–0)	University Hall (5,467); Charlottesville, Virginia
Nov. 28*; 7:30 pm, no	Elon	W 106–71	4–2 (0–0)	University Hall (2,043); Charlottesville, Virginia
Dec. 1; 8:00 pm, no	Florida State	L 69–72	4–3 (0–1)	University Hall (6,296); Charlottesville, Virginia
Dec. 5*; 1:30 pm, no	New Hampshire	W 93–52	5–3 (0–1)	University Hall (5,702); Charlottesville, Virginia
Dec. 8*; 7:30 pm, no	Liberty	W 95–70	6–3 (0–1)	University Hall (5,502); Charlottesville, Virginia
Dec. 12*; 3:00 pm, no	No. 18 St. John's	L 68–95	6–4 (0–1)	University Hall (8,394); Charlottesville, Virginia
Dec. 22*; 7:30 pm, no	VMI	W 82–64	7–4 (0–1)	University Hall (6,085); Charlottesville, Virginia
Dec. 27*; 7:30 pm, no	Delaware	W 72–64	8–4 (0–1)	University Hall (7,059); Charlottesville, Virginia
Dec. 30*; 7:00 pm, no	at Loyola	W 89–70	9–4 (0–1)	Reitz Arena (2,106); Baltimore, Maryland
Jan. 2 Noon, no	at Wake Forest	L 53–69	9–5 (0–2)	LJVM Coliseum (12,704); Winston-Salem, North Carolina
Jan. 7; 8:00 pm, no	No. 5 Maryland	L 66–71	9–6 (0–3)	University Hall (8,268); Charlottesville, Virginia
Jan. 10; 4:00 pm, no	at No. 2 Duke	L 69–115	9–7 (0–4)	Cameron Indoor Stadium (9,314); Durham, North Carolina
Jan. 14; 8:00 pm, no	at NC State	L 72–82	9–8 (0–5)	Reynolds Coliseum (12,400); Raleigh, North Carolina
Jan. 17; 1:30 pm, no	No. 25 Clemson	W 65–58	10–8 (1–5)	University Hall (6,559); Charlottesville, Virginia
Jan. 21; 8:00 pm, no	at No. 10 North Carolina	L 47–71	10–9 (1–6)	Dean Smith Center (21,572); Chapel Hill, North Carolina
Jan. 23; Noon, no	Georgia Tech	L 65–77	10–10 (1–7)	University Hall (6,846); Charlottesville, Virginia
Jan. 27*; 7:30 pm, no	vs. Virginia Tech	W 64–55	11–10 (1–7)	Richmond Coliseum (5,348); Richmond, Virginia
Jan. 30; Noon, no	at Florida State	W 67–60	12–10 (2–7)	Tallahassee-Leon County Civic Center (5,817); Tallahassee, Florida
Feb. 3; 8:00 pm, no	Wake Forest	W 64–54	13–10 (3–7)	University Hall (7,129); Charlottesville, Virginia
Feb. 6; 1:00 pm, no	at No. 7 Maryland	L 72–88	13–11 (3–8)	Cameron Indoor Stadium (13,594); Durham, North Carolina
Feb. 11; 8:00 pm, no	No. 1 Duke	L 54–100	13–12 (3–9)	University Hall (8,394); Charlottesville, Virginia
Feb. 14; 4:00 pm, no	NC State	W 82–79 ^{OT}	14–12 (4–9)	University Hall (7,521); Charlottesville, Virginia
Feb. 17; 7:00 pm, no	at Clemson	L 65–88	14–13 (4–10)	Littlejohn Coliseum (10,300); Clemson, South Carolina
Feb. 20; 3:30 pm, no	No. 14 North Carolina	L 66–67	14–14 (4–11)	University Hall (8,099); Charlottesville, Virginia
Feb. 25; 9:00 pm, no	at Georgia Tech	L 68–74 ^{OT}	14–15 (4–12)	Alexander Memorial Coliseum (5,746); Atlanta, Georgia
ACC Tournament
Mar. 4; 9:00 pm, no	vs. No. 1 Duke; ACC Quarterfinal	L 67–104	14–16	Charlotte Coliseum (23,895); Charlotte, North Carolina
*Non-conference game. (#) Tournament seedings in parentheses. All times are in Eastern Time.
