= 1998–99 UCLA Bruins men's basketball team =

American college basketball season

1998–99 UCLA Bruins men's basketball

NCAA tournament, Round of 64
- Conference: Pacific-10

Ranking
- Coaches: No. 21
- AP: No. 15
- Record: 22–8 (one loss vacated) (12–6 Pac-10)
- Head coach: Steve Lavin (3rd season)
- Assistant coaches: Michael Holton; Jim Saia; Steve Spencer
- Home arena: Pauley Pavilion

1998–99 Pacific-10 Conference men's basketball standings
	Conf.				Overall
Team	W		L	PCT	W		L	PCT
No. 7 Stanford	15	–	3	.833	26	–	7	.788
No. 12 Arizona	13	–	5	.722	22	–	7	.759
No. 15 UCLA	12	–	6	.667	22	–	9	.710
Washington	10	–	8	.556	17	–	12	.586
California	8	–	10	.444	22	–	11	.667
Oregon	8	–	10	.444	19	–	13	.594
USC	7	–	11	.389	15	–	13	.536
Oregon State	7	–	11	.389	13	–	14	.481
Arizona State	6	–	12	.333	14	–	16	.467
Washington State	4	–	14	.222	10	–	19	.345
As of July 26, 2011; Rankings from AP Poll

The 1998–99 UCLA Bruins men's basketball team represented the University of California, Los Angeles in the 1998–99 NCAA Division I men's basketball season. The team finished 3rd in the conference. The Bruins competed in the 1999 NCAA Division I men's basketball tournament, losing to the Detroit Titans in the round of 64. This was the third season for head coach Steve Lavin.

== Roster ==
1998–99 UCLA Bruins men's basketball team
Players
Coaches

Pos.	#	Name	Height	Weight	Year	Hometown
G	21	Ryan Bailey	6 ft 1 in (1.85 m)	—	So
F	23	Matt Barnes	6 ft 7 in (2.01 m)	226 lb (103 kg)	Fr	Santa Clara, California
G	5	Baron Davis (C)	6 ft 2 in (1.88 m)	—	So	Los Angeles, California
F	30	Sean Farnham	6 ft 6 in (1.98 m)	—	Jr
C	50	Dan Gadzuric	6 ft 11 in (2.11 m)	240 lb (109 kg)	Fr	The Hague, Netherlands
G	22	Rico Hines	6 ft 4 in (1.93 m)	—	So	Greenville, North Carolina
G	20	Brandon Loyd	5 ft 11 in (1.8 m)	—	Sr
F	0	Jérôme Moïso	6 ft 10 in (2.08 m)	—	Fr	Paris, France
G	11	Todd Ramasar	6 ft 5 in (1.96 m)	—	So
F	13	Travis Reed	6 ft 7 in (2.01 m)	—	So	Los Angeles, California
F	4	JaRon Rush	6 ft 6 in (1.98 m)	—	Fr	Kansas City, Kansas
G	25	Earl Watson	6 ft 0 in (1.83 m)	—	So	Kansas City, Kansas
G	34	Ray Young	6 ft 3 in (1.91 m)	—	Fr

Head coach

Steve Lavin (Chapman)

Assistant coach(es)

- Michael Holton (UCLA)
- Jim Saia (Chapman)
- Steve Spencer (Somona State)

Legend

- (C) Team captain
- (S) Suspended
- (I) Ineligible
- (W) Walk-on
- Injured
- Current redshirt

Roster
Last update: 30 January 2018

== Schedule ==
Date time, TV	Rank^{#}	Opponent^{#}	Result	Record	Site city, state
Exhibition
November 10, 1998		vs. California All Stars; Exhibition	W 95–89	0–0	Pauley Pavilion; Los Angeles, CA
November 12, 1998		vs. Taiwan; Exhibition	W 98–65	0–0	Pauley Pavilion; Los Angeles, CA
Regular Season
November 19, 1998; FSW2	No. 11	Santa Clara	W 89–76	1–0	Pauley Pavilion (8,532); Los Angeles, CA
November 26, 1998	No. 10	vs. San Francisco; Puerto Rico Shootout	W 69–62	2–0	Guerrera Sports Complex (2,500); Bayamon, PR
November 27, 1998; ESPN2	No. 10	vs. No. 5 Maryland; Puerto Rico Shootout	L 54–70	2–1	Guerrera Sports Complex (2,500); Bayamon, PR
November 28, 1998; ESPN	No. 10	vs. No. 4 Kentucky; Puerto Rico Shootout	L 62–66	2–2	Guerrera Sports Complex (2,500); Bayamon, PR
December 2, 1998	No. 18	Delaware State	W 109–67	3–2	Pauley Pavilion (7,509); Los Angeles, CA
December 5, 1998; KCAL	No. 18	vs. No. 11 Oklahoma State; John R. Wooden Classic	W 69–66	4–2	Arrowhead Pond of Anaheim (14,237); Anaheim, CA
December 12, 1998; FSN	No. 15	UNLV	W 72–67	5–2	Pauley Pavilion (9,855); Los Angeles, CA
December 19, 1998; FSW2	No. 12	Cal State Northridge	W 114–97	6–2	Pauley Pavilion (8,584); Los Angeles, CA
December 23, 1998; FSW2	No. 12	American	W 66–56	7–2	Pauley Pavilion (7,442); Los Angeles, CA
December 29, 1998; FSW2	No. 10	Loyola Marymount	W 92–67	8–2	Pauley Pavilion (10,030); Los Angeles, CA
January 2, 1999; FX	No. 10	No. 6 Arizona	W 82–75	9–2 (1–0)	Pauley Pavilion (11,453); Los Angeles, CA
January 4, 1999; FSW2	No. 10	Arizona State	W 88–85 ^{OT}	10–2 (2–0)	Pauley Pavilion (8,828); Los Angeles, CA
January 7, 1999; FSW2	No. 8	at Oregon State	L 63–65	10–3 (2–1)	Gill Coliseum (7,232); Corvallis, OR
January 9, 1999	No. 8	at Oregon	W 65–63	11–3 (3–1)	McArthur Court (9,087); Eugene, OR
January 14, 1999; FSN	No. 10	California	W 72–61	12–3 (4–1)	Pauley Pavilion (11,910); Los Angeles, CA
January 16, 1999; FX	No. 10	No. 4 Stanford	L 59–72	12–4 (4–2)	Pauley Pavilion (12,922); Los Angeles, CA
January 20, 1999; FSN	No. 13	at USC	W 98–80	13–4 (5–2)	Los Angeles Memorial Sports Arena (10,986); Los Angeles, CA
January 23, 1999; ABC	No. 13	at No. 24 Louisville	W 82–70	14–4	Freedom Hall (19,987); Louisville, KY
January 28, 1999	No. 11	at Washington State	W 69–66	15–4 (6–2)	Beasley Coliseum (5,520); Pullman, WA
January 31, 1999; ABC	No. 11	at Washington	L 83–93	15–5 (6–3)	Hec Edmundson Pavilion (7,900); Seattle, WA
February 4, 1999	No. 13	Oregon	W 79–77	16–5 (7–3)	Pauley Pavilion (10,270); Los Angeles, CA
February 7, 1999; ABC	No. 13	Oregon State	W 85–67	17–5 (8–3)	Pauley Pavilion (9,472); Los Angeles, CA
February 11, 1999; FSN	No. 9	at No. 6 Stanford	L 73–77	17–6 (8–4)	Maples Pavilion (7,391); Stanford, CA
February 13, 1999; ABC	No. 9	at California	L 67–85	17–7 (8–5)	Oakland Arena (15,676); Oakland, CA
February 17, 1999; FSW2	No. 16	USC	W 68–63	18–7 (9–5)	Pauley Pavilion (11,601); Los Angeles, CA
February 21, 1999; ABC	No. 16	No. 21 Syracuse	W 93–69	19–7	Pauley Pavilion (11,721); Los Angeles, CA
February 25, 1999; FSW2	No. 15	Washington State	W 100–61	20–7 (10–5)	Pauley Pavilion (10,486); Los Angeles, CA
February 27, 1999; FSN	No. 15	Washington	W 79–62	21–7 (11–5)	Pauley Pavilion (11,465); Los Angeles, CA
March 04, 1999	No. 12	at Arizona State	W 68–65	22–7 (12–5)	Wells Fargo Arena (9,007); Tempe, AZ
March 06, 1999; ABC	No. 12	at No. 13 Arizona	L 70–87	22–8 (12–6)	McKale Center (14,545); Tucson, AZ
NCAA tournament
March 11, 1999	No. 15	vs. Detroit; First Round	L 53–56	22–9	RCA Dome (27,959); Indianapolis, IN
*Non-conference game. ^{#}Rankings from AP Poll. (#) Tournament seedings in parentheses. All times are in Pacific Time.

== 1999 NBA draft ==
Baron Davis was drafted third overall by the Charlotte Hornets in the 1999 NBA draft.
