= Albert White (basketball) =

American basketball player (born 1977)

Personal information
- Born: June 13, 1977 (age 49) Inkster, Michigan, US
- Listed height: 6 ft 5 1/2 in (1.97 m)
- Listed weight: 235 lb (107 kg)

Career information
- High school: Inkster (Inkster, Michigan)
- College: Michigan (1995–1996); Missouri (1997–1999)
- NBA draft: 1999: undrafted
- Playing career: 1999–2012
- Position: Small forward / shooting guard

Career highlights
- IBL All-Star (2005); All-KBL (2004); CBA champion (2009); CBA All-Star (2003); All-CBA Second Team (2003); CBA All-Rookie Team (2000); BBL All-Star (2002); First-team All-Big 12 (1999); McDonald's All-American (1995); First-team Parade All-American (1995)
Medals
Men's basketball
Representing United States
FIBA Americas U18 Championship
Gold medal – first place	1994 Santa Rosa	Team competition

Albert White (born June 13, 1977) is an American former professional basketball player. White played in a variety of domestic and foreign basketball leagues. In high school, he was one of the most highly decorated basketball players in the United States. In college, he achieved success after transferring from University of Michigan to University of Missouri, but his success did not lead him to the National Basketball Association (henceforth NBA). Instead, he went to the Continental Basketball Association (CBA) and has since played in various developmental and foreign basketball leagues as a professional.

In high school, he was a Street & Smith, Parade, and McDonald's All-American and in college he became a first team All-Big 12 Conference player and CNN/Sports Illustrated Big 12 Player of the Year. White was implicated in the University of Michigan basketball scandal, but was not named in the final indictments. He transferred from Michigan to Missouri after his freshman year, which included the basketball scandal, for unrelated reasons. He achieved several firsts for Missouri and led the team to their best season in the Big 12 era in 1998–99.

He declared himself eligible for the 1999 NBA draft as a redshirt junior and went undrafted. He was drafted in the 1999 CBA draft. He has had multiple stints in the CBA, United States Basketball League (USBL), International Basketball League (IBL) and various foreign leagues. As a professional, he once was named to the All-CBA second team. He was selected as an All-star or All-league player and been part of championship teams in several of the professional leagues he played in.

== High school ==
born June 13, 1977, White went to high school at Metro Detroit's Inkster High School, where he played basketball. While at Inkster, he placed third in the 1995 Mr. Basketball of Michigan voting, which was won by Robert Traylor. He was named a Parade All-American as a junior according to the Detroit Public School League records, and according to CNN/SI he was honored by Parade as a senior. Prior to his senior season, he was named a Street & Smith All-American. As a senior, he was named a McDonald's All-American. He was also named Detroit News/Detroit Free Press first-team (known as Dream Team) All-State for both his junior and senior seasons. He was part of one of the most star-studded McDonald's All-American classes with future NBA All-stars Vince Carter, Shareef Abdur-Rahim, Stephon Marbury, Antawn Jamison, Kevin Garnett, Paul Pierce, and Chauncey Billups. During the tenth anniversary of his Street & Smith 1994–95 High School All-America Team, eight of the twenty members were still playing in the NBA.

== College ==
White was implicated in early investigations of the University of Michigan basketball scandal because he accepted US$37,000. He was not named in later indictments and was not named as having been called before the grand jury. It was not clear how much money White received and how much was given to his friends and family to influence his decision to attend Michigan. Although White was one of several players captured on federal wiretaps and interviewed by both the Federal Bureau of Investigation and Internal Revenue Service, he cooperated fully and did not need to hire a lawyer. He was not among the players called before the grand jury (Robert Traylor, Chris Webber, Jalen Rose, Maurice Taylor, and Louis Bullock) and was not found to have received large amounts of money.

White transferred to the Missouri Tigers men's basketball team due to a clash with Steve Fisher after his freshman year with the Michigan Wolverines men's basketball team. White left the team for what was described as disciplinary reasons. White, who averaged 9.0 points and 4.7 rebounds, had been one of the most improved players during the previous season. He averaged eleven points and seven rebounds during the final seven Big Ten Conference games. Nonetheless, he was suspended for the first semester in October 1996 for violating a team rule.

White played for the 1995–96 Michigan Wolverines team that went to the 1996 NCAA Men's Division I Basketball Tournament as a seventh seed, but lost 80–76 in the first round to the Texas Longhorns men's basketball team. He returned to the 1999 NCAA Men's Division I Basketball Tournament as an eighth seed with Missouri, but lost 61–59 in the first round to the New Mexico Lobos men's basketball team. However, as a result of the basketball scandal, Michigan has vacated all games from the 1995–96 season. As of 2008, the second place Big 12 finish that season is the only top four placing for the Tigers since the formation of the Big 12 conference during the 1996–97 season.

During the 1998–99 season he became the first Missouri Tigers player to lead the team in scoring, rebounds and assists in the same season, and he placed in the top five in the Big 12 in both scoring and rebounding. That season he helped the Missouri Tigers snap the Kansas Jayhawks men's basketball team's 35 game home conference winning streak which had extended from February 20, 1994, to January 1999. That season he was twice named Big 12 men's basketball player of the week and made the official All-Big 12 first team. CNN/Sports Illustrated named White the Player of the Year in the Big 12. However, he lost the official conference player of the year award to Venson Hamilton, and he was only listed as a second team All-Big 12 player by the Associated Press.

After his redshirt junior season, he declared himself eligible for the 1999 NBA draft with one year of collegiate eligibility remaining, making him the first Missouri Tiger to declare early for the NBA draft. Although some speculated that he was making a mistake declaring early for the draft, he had the burden of child support and some projected him as a likely draft selection. White went undrafted in the NBA draft after surrendering his final year of eligibility. However, that year some other early draft entrants met with better success: the first four selections (Elton Brand, Steve Francis, Baron Davis, and Lamar Odom) also had surrendered some remaining collegiate eligibility by declaring themselves eligible to be drafted in the NBA draft and high schoolers Jonathan Bender and Leon Smith were drafted in the first round. Many other underclassmen in his draft year such as Ron Artest, Richard Hamilton, and Corey Maggette have gone on to have successful NBA careers.

== Professional career ==
White was drafted in the 1999 CBA draft by the Sioux Falls Skyforce. During the first year, he was a CBA All-rookie selection. He spent the 1999–2000 and some of the 2000–01 season with the Sioux Falls Skyforce. He also spent some of 2000–01 and 2001–02 with the Florida Sea Dragons of the USBL. During the 2001–02 he spent part of the year with the USBL's Oklahoma Storm and the Brighton Bears of the British Basketball League (BBL). During the 2002–03 regular season as a member of the Rockford Lightning, he finished fourth in the CBA in scoring and seventh in offensive rebounds. That season he was named to the All-CBA second team. During the 2003–04 season he played for the Incheon ET Land Black Slamer of the Korean Basketball League (KBL). During 2005, he played with the Detroit Pros of the IBL. During the 2007–08 season he led the Pittsburgh Xplosion to the playoffs. In 33 regular season games he averaged 12.6 points and 4.8 rebounds for the 18–15 team.

White won a CBA championship with the Lawton-Fort Sill Cavalry in 2009.

White has also played in the National Superior Basketball of Puerto Rico, Liga Profesional de Baloncesto (LPB) of Venezuela and in various leagues in Italy. Over the course of his professional career he was selected as an All-star or All-league player in the CBA, BBL, KBL and IBL. He has been part of Championship teams in the USBL in 2002, CBA in 2003 and LPB in 2007.

On October 21, 2011, it was announced that White had made the final twelve-man roster for the National Basketball League of Canada's London Lightning. He has since been placed on the inactive reserve list.
