= 1998–99 Duke Blue Devils men's basketball team =

American college basketball season

1998–99 Duke Blue Devils men's basketball

NCAA tournament runner ups NCAA Division I regular season champions ACC tournament champions ACC regular season champions

National Championship Game, L 74–77 vs. Connecticut
- Conference: Atlantic Coast Conference

Ranking
- Coaches: No. 2
- AP: No. 1
- Record: 37–2 (16–0 ACC)
- Head coach: Mike Krzyzewski (19th season)
- Assistant coaches: Quin Snyder; David Henderson; Johnny Dawkins
- Home arena: Cameron Indoor Stadium

1998–99 ACC men's basketball standings
	Conf.				Overall
Team	W		L	PCT	W		L	PCT
No. 1 Duke †	16	–	0	1.000	37	–	2	.949
No. 5 Maryland	13	–	3	.813	28	–	6	.824
No. 13 North Carolina	10	–	6	.625	24	–	10	.706
Wake Forest	7	–	9	.438	17	–	14	.548
NC State	6	–	10	.375	19	–	14	.576
Georgia Tech	6	–	10	.375	15	–	16	.484
Clemson	5	–	11	.313	20	–	15	.571
Florida State	5	–	11	.313	13	–	17	.433
Virginia	4	–	12	.250	14	–	16	.467
† 1999 ACC tournament winner Rankings from AP Poll

The 1998–99 Duke Blue Devils men's basketball team represented Duke University. The head coach was Mike Krzyzewski. The team played their home games in the Cameron Indoor Stadium in Durham, North Carolina, and were a member of the Atlantic Coast Conference. Duke finished with an overall record of 37–2 and were undefeated in the ACC (16–0).

In the ACC tournament, Duke won by double digits in all three games, capping it with a win over archrival North Carolina 96–73. In the NCAA tournament, the Blue Devils continued their winning streak with victories over Florida A&M, Tulsa, Southwest Missouri State, Temple, and Michigan State, to advance to the championship game, where they were upset by Connecticut 77–74.

== Roster ==
1998–99 Duke Blue Devils men's basketball team
Players
Coaches

Pos.	#	Name	Height	Weight	Year	Previous school	Hometown
F	31	Shane Battier	6 ft 8 in (2.03 m)	220 lb (100 kg)	So	Country Day	Birmingham, MI
C	42	Elton Brand	6 ft 9 in (2.06 m)	254 lb (115 kg)	So	Peekskill	Peekskill, NY
G	22	Jay Heaps	5 ft 9 in (1.75 m)	155 lb (70 kg)	Sr	Longmeadow	Longmeadow, MA
G	-	Ryan Caldbeck	6 ft 3 in (1.91 m)	190 lb (86 kg)	So	Rice Memorial	Shelburne, VT
G	3	Justin Caldbeck	6 ft 3 in (1.91 m)	180 lb (82 kg)	Sr	Rice Memorial	Shelburne, VT
G	5	William Avery	6 ft 2 in (1.88 m)	190 lb (86 kg)	So	Oak Hill	Augusta, GA
G	-	D. Bryant	6 ft 2 in (1.88 m)	215 lb (98 kg)	Fr	Cass Technical	Detroit, MI
F/C	41	Taymon Domzalski	6 ft 10 in (2.08 m)	240 lb (109 kg)	Sr	New Mexico Military	Lovington, NM
G/F	14	Nate James	6 ft 6 in (1.98 m)	205 lb (93 kg)	So	St. John	Washington, DC
F/C	34	Chris Burgess	6 ft 10 in (2.08 m)	244 lb (111 kg)	So	Woodbridge	Irvine, CA
G	21	Trajan Langdon	6 ft 4 in (1.93 m)	211 lb (96 kg)	RS Sr	East Anchorage	Anchorage, AK
G	13	J.D. Simpson	6 ft 4 in (1.93 m)	200 lb (91 kg)	So	St. Francis	Woodside, CA
G/F	50	Corey Maggette	6 ft 6 in (1.98 m)	225 lb (102 kg)	Fr	Fenwick	Oak Park, IL
G/F	23	Chris Carrawell	6 ft 6 in (1.98 m)	220 lb (100 kg)	Jr	Cardinal Ritter	St. Louis, MO

Head coach

- Mike Krzyzewski

Assistant coach(es)

- Quin Snyder
- David Henderson
- Johnny Dawkins

Legend

- (C) Team captain
- (S) Suspended
- (I) Ineligible
- (W) Walk-on
- Injured
- Current redshirt

Roster
Last update: 2017-05-13

== Schedule ==
Date time, TV	Rank^{#}	Opponent^{#}	Result	Record	Site city, state
Regular season
November 14*; 5:00 p.m., HTS	No. 1	Fairfield	W 98–66	1–0	Cameron Indoor Stadium (9,314); Durham, NC
November 17*; 8:00 p.m., ESPN2	No. 1	vs. Davidson	W 94–61	2–0	Charlotte Coliseum (10,136); Charlotte, NC
November 21*; 7:00 p.m.	No. 1	South Carolina State	W 120–56	3–0	Cameron Indoor Stadium (9,314); Durham, NC
November 26*; 12:00 a.m., ESPN	No. 1	vs. Notre Dame; Great Alaska Shootout	W 111–82	4–0	Sullivan Arena (8,700); Anchorage, AK
November 27*; 12:00 a.m., ESPN	No. 1	vs. Fresno State; Great Alaska Shootout	W 93–82	5–0	Sullivan Arena (8,700); Anchorage, AK
November 28*; 12:00 a.m., ESPN	No. 1	vs. No. 15 Cincinnati; Great Alaska Shootout	L 75–77	5–1	Sullivan Stadium (8,700); Anchorage, AK
December 2*; 9:30 p.m., ESPN	No. 4	vs. No. 9 Michigan State; Great Eight	W 73–67	6–1	United Center (19,412); Chicago, IL
December 5; 7:00 p.m., ESPN	No. 4	NC State	W 89–69	7–1 (1–0)	Cameron Indoor Stadium (9,314); Durham, NC
December 9*; 7:30 p.m., ESPN	No. 3	Florida	W 116–86	8–1	Cameron Indoor Stadium (9,314); Durham, NC
December 12*; 9:00 p.m., ESPN2	No. 3	Michigan; Rivalry	W 108–64	9–1	Cameron Indoor Stadium (9,314); Durham, NC
December 20*; 1:00 p.m.	No. 2	North Carolina A&T	W 88–53	10–1	Cameron Indoor Stadium (9,314); Durham, NC
December 22*; 9:00 p.m., ESPN	No. 2	vs. No. 3 Kentucky; Jimmy V Classic	W 71–60	11–1	Continental Airlines Arena (20,029); East Rutherford, NJ
December 30*; 7:30 p.m., FSS	No. 2	UNC Greensboro	W 104–58	12–1	Cameron Indoor Stadium (9,314); Durham, NC
January 3; 1:30 p.m., ESPN2	No. 2	at No. 4 Maryland; Rivalry	W 82–64	13–1 (2–0)	Cole Field House (14,500); College Park, MD
January 6; 9:00 p.m., ESPN	No. 2	Georgia Tech	W 99–58	14–1 (3–0)	Cameron Indoor Stadium (9,314); Durham, NC
January 10; 4:00 p.m., RJ	No. 2	Virginia	W 115–69	15–1 (4–0)	Cameron Indoor Stadium (9,314); Durham, NC
January 13; 7:00 p.m., ESPN	No. 2	at Wake Forest	W 82–72	16–1 (5–0)	LJVM Coliseum (14,369); Winston-Salem, NC
January 16; 1:00 p.m., ABC	No. 2	Florida State	W 98–73	17–1 (6–0)	Cameron Indoor Stadium (9,314); Durham, NC
January 20; 9:00 p.m., ESPN	No. 2	at Clemson	W 82–60	18–1 (7–0)	Littlejohn Coliseum (11,200); Clemson, SC
January 24*; 12:00 p.m., CBS	No. 2	at No. 8 St. John's	W 92–88	19–1	Madison Square Garden (19,528); New York City, New York
January 27; 9:00 p.m., ESPN	No. 2	No. 10 North Carolina; Rivalry	W 89–77	20–1 (8–0)	Cameron Indoor Stadium (9,314); Durham, NC
January 30; 4:00 p.m., ESPN2	No. 2	at NC State	W 80–61	21–1 (9–0)	Reynolds Coliseum (12,400); Raleigh, NC
February 3; 9:00 p.m., ESPN	No. 2	No. 7 Maryland	W 95–77	22–1 (10–0)	Cameron Indoor Stadium (9,314); Durham, NC
February 6; 1:00 p.m., ESPN2	No. 2	at Georgia Tech	W 87–79	23–1 (11–0)	Alexander Memorial Coliseum; Atlanta, GA
February 11; 8:00 p.m., RJ	No. 1	at Virginia	W 100–54	24–1 (12–0)	University Hall (8,394); Charlottesville, VA
February 13; 1:30 p.m., ABC	No. 1	Wake Forest	W 102–71	25–1 (13–0)	Cameron Indoor Stadium (9,314); Durham, NC
February 17; 7:00 p.m., ESPN	No. 1	at Florida State	W 85–59	26–1 (14–0)	Leon County Civic Center (8,704); Tallahassee, FL
February 20; 1:00 p.m., ESPN2	No. 1	Clemson	W 92–65	27–1 (15–0)	Cameron Indoor Stadium (9,314); Durham, NC
February 24*; ESPN, 9:00 p.m.	No. 1	at DePaul	W 96–64	28–1	United Center (22,180); Chicago, IL
February 27; 8:00 p.m., ESPN2	No. 1	at No. 14 North Carolina	W 81–61	29–1 (16–0)	Dean Smith Center (21,572); Chapel Hill, NC
ACC Tournament
March 4*; 9:30 p.m., RJ	(1) No. 1	vs. (9) Virginia; First Round	W 104–67	30–1	Charlotte Coliseum (23,895); Charlotte, NC
March 6*; 1:30 p.m., ESPN	(1) No. 1	vs. (5) NC State; Semifinal	W 83–68	31–1	Charlotte Coliseum (23,895); Charlotte, NC
March 7*; 1:00 p.m., ESPN	(1) No. 1	vs. (3) No. 15 North Carolina; Championship	W 96–73	32–1	Charlotte Coliseum (23,895); Charlotte, NC
NCAA tournament
March 12*; 1:45 p.m., CBS	(1 E) No. 1	vs. (16 E) Florida A&M; First Round	W 99–58	33–1	Charlotte Coliseum (19,872); Charlotte, NC
March 14*; 1:45 p.m., CBS	(1 E) No. 1	vs. (9 E) Tulsa; Second Round	W 97–56	34–1	Charlotte Coliseum (20,172); Charlotte, NC
March 19*; CBS	(1 E) No. 1	vs. (12 E) Southwest Missouri State; Sweet Sixteen	W 78–61	35–1	Meadowlands Arena (19,233); East Rutherford, NJ
March 21*; CBS	(1 E) No. 1	vs. (6 E) Temple; Elite Eight	W 85–64	36–1	Meadowlands Arena (19,557); East Rutherford, NJ
March 27*; 8:15 p.m., CBS	(1 E) No. 1	vs. (1 M) No. 2 Michigan State; National Semifinal	W 68–62	37–1	Tropicana Field (41,340); St. Petersburg, FL
March 29*; 9:15 p.m., CBS	(1 E) No. 1	vs. (1 W) No. 3 Connecticut; National Championship	L 74–77	37–2	Tropicana Field (41,340); St. Petersburg, FL
*Non-conference game. ^{#}Rankings from AP Poll. (#) Tournament seedings in parentheses. E=East.

== Awards and honors ==
- Mike Krzyzewski, Naismith College Coach of the Year
- Mike Krzyzewski, ACC Coach of the Year
- Elton Brand, ACC Player of the Year, Adolph Rupp Trophy, Oscar Robertson Trophy, Naismith College Player of the Year, John R. Wooden Award

== Team players drafted into the NBA ==
Round	Pick	Player	NBA club
1	1	Elton Brand	Chicago Bulls
1	11	Trajan Langdon	Cleveland Cavaliers
1	13	Corey Maggette	Seattle SuperSonics
1	14	William Avery	Minnesota Timberwolves
