= 1999 ACC men's basketball tournament =

- Classification: Division I
- Season: 1998–99
- Teams: 9
- Site: Charlotte, North Carolina; Charlotte Coliseum
- Champions: Duke (10th title)
- Winning coach: Mike Krzyzewski (4th title)
- MVP: Elton Brand (Duke)

1998–99 ACC men's basketball standings
	Conf.				Overall
Team	W		L	PCT	W		L	PCT
No. 1 Duke †	16	–	0	1.000	37	–	2	.949
No. 5 Maryland	13	–	3	.813	28	–	6	.824
No. 13 North Carolina	10	–	6	.625	24	–	10	.706
Wake Forest	7	–	9	.438	17	–	14	.548
NC State	6	–	10	.375	19	–	14	.576
Georgia Tech	6	–	10	.375	15	–	16	.484
Clemson	5	–	11	.313	20	–	15	.571
Florida State	5	–	11	.313	13	–	17	.433
Virginia	4	–	12	.250	14	–	16	.467
† 1999 ACC tournament winner Rankings from AP Poll

The 1999 Atlantic Coast Conference men's basketball tournament took place from March 4 to 7 in Charlotte, North Carolina, at the second Charlotte Coliseum. Duke won the championship game over North Carolina. It was the first of an unprecedented five consecutive ACC Tournament championships. Duke's championship followed a perfect 16–0 record in conference play. Elton Brand of Duke was tournament MVP.

== Bracket ==
First round March 4
1	#1 Duke	104
9	Virginia	67
7	Clemson	85
8	Florida State	87

Quarterfinals; March 5
1	Duke
(bye)
4	Wake Forest	52
5	NC State	66
2	#5 Maryland	93
8	Florida State	69
3	#15 North Carolina	78
6	Georgia Tech	49

Semifinals; March 6
1	#1 Duke	83
5	NC State	68
2	#5 Maryland	79
3	#15 North Carolina	86

Championship Game; March 7
1	#1 Duke	96
3	#15 North Carolina	73

AP rankings at time of tournament

== Awards and honors ==
=== Everett Case Award ===
Player	School
Elton Brand	Duke

=== All Tournament Teams ===
==== First Team ====
Player	School
William Avery	Duke
Elton Brand	Duke
Steve Francis	Maryland
Ademola Okulaja	North Carolina
Max Owens	North Carolina

==== Second Team ====
Player	School
Shane Battier	Duke
Ed Cota	North Carolina
Anthony Grundy	NC State
Corey Maggette	Duke
Kris Lang	North Carolina
