= 1998–99 California Golden Bears men's basketball team =

American college basketball season

1998–99 California Golden Bears men's basketball

NIT champions
- Conference: Pacific-10 Conference
- Record: 22–11 (8–10 Pac-10)
- Head coach: Ben Braun (3rd season)
- Home arena: The Arena in Oakland

1998–99 Pacific-10 Conference men's basketball standings
	Conf.				Overall
Team	W		L	PCT	W		L	PCT
No. 7 Stanford	15	–	3	.833	26	–	7	.788
No. 12 Arizona	13	–	5	.722	22	–	7	.759
No. 15 UCLA	12	–	6	.667	22	–	9	.710
Washington	10	–	8	.556	17	–	12	.586
California	8	–	10	.444	22	–	11	.667
Oregon	8	–	10	.444	19	–	13	.594
USC	7	–	11	.389	15	–	13	.536
Oregon State	7	–	11	.389	13	–	14	.481
Arizona State	6	–	12	.333	14	–	16	.467
Washington State	4	–	14	.222	10	–	19	.345
As of July 26, 2011; Rankings from AP Poll

The 1998–99 California Golden Bears men's basketball team represented the University of California, Berkeley in the 1998–99 season. Led by head coach Ben Braun, the Bears finished the regular season with a 8–10 record in the Pac-10, placing them in a tie for fifth.

== Roster ==
1998–99 California Golden Bears men's basketball team
Players
Coaches

Pos.	#	Name	Height	Weight	Year	Hometown
G		Carl Boyd	—	—	Jr
G		Geno Carlisle	—	—	Sr	Grand Rapids, Michigan
C		Francisco Elson	—	—	Sr	Rotterdam, Netherlands
G		Dennis Gates	—	—	Fr	Country Club Hills, Illinois

Head coach

- Ben Braun

Assistant coach(es)

Legend

- (C) Team captain
- (S) Suspended
- (I) Ineligible
- (W) Walk-on
- Injured
- Current redshirt

Roster

== Schedule and results ==
Date time, TV	Rank^{#}	Opponent^{#}	Result	Record	Site city, state
Non-conference regular season
Nov 15, 1998*		at Hawaii	W 71–60	1–0	Stan Sheriff Center; Honolulu, Hawaii
Nov 25, 1998*		at Eastern Washington	W 94–63	2–0	Reese Court; Cheney, Washington
Nov 28, 1998*		at DePaul	L 72–75	2–1	Rosemont Horizon; Rosemont, Illinois
Dec 5, 1998*		Rhode Island	W 71–64	4–1	The Arena in Oakland; Oakland, California
Dec 29, 1998*		No. 9 North Carolina	W 78–71	9–1	The Arena in Oakland; Oakland, California
Pacific-10 regular season
Jan 9, 1999	No. 25	at No. 4 Stanford	L 62–71	10–3 (1–2)	Maples Pavilion; Stanford, California
Jan 14, 1999		at No. 10 UCLA	L 61–72	10–4 (1–3)	Pauley Pavilion (11,910); Los Angeles, California
Jan 21, 1999		Washington	L 73–87	11–5 (2–4)	The Arena in Oakland; Oakland, California
Jan 23, 1999		Washington State	W 75–68	12–5 (3–4)	The Arena in Oakland; Oakland, California
Jan 30, 1999		at No. 13 Arizona	L 74–91	12–7 (3–6)	McKale Center; Tucson, Arizona
Feb 3, 1999		No. 4 Stanford	L 55–57	12–8 (3–7)	The Arena in Oakland; Oakland, California
Feb 13, 1999		No. 9 UCLA	W 85–67	14–8 (5–7)	The Arena in Oakland (15,676); Oakland, California
Feb 18, 1999		at Washington State	L 73–79	14–9 (5–8)	Beasley Coliseum; Pullman, Washington
Feb 20, 1999		at Washington	L 61–86	14–10 (5–9)	Hec Edmundson Pavilion; Seattle, Washington
Feb 25, 1999		No. 7 Arizona	W 89–76	15–10 (6–9)	The Arena in Oakland; Oakland, California
NIT Tournament
Mar 10, 1999*		Fresno State; First round	W 79–71	18–11	The Arena in Oakland; Oakland, California
Mar 16, 1999*		at DePaul; Second round	W 58–57	19–11	Rosemont Horizon; Rosemont, Illinois
Mar 18, 1999*		Colorado State; Quarterfinals	W 71–62	20–11	The Arena in Oakland; Oakland, California
Mar 23, 1999*		vs. Oregon; Semifinals	W 85–69	21–11	Madison Square Garden; New York, New York
Mar 25, 1999*		vs. Clemson; Finals	W 61–60	22–11	Madison Square Garden; New York, New York
*Non-conference game. ^{#}Rankings from AP Poll. (#) Tournament seedings in parentheses. All times are in Pacific.

== Team players drafted into the NBA ==
Round	Pick	Player	NBA Team
2	41	Francisco Elson	Denver Nuggets
