= 1998–99 North Carolina Tar Heels men's basketball team =

American college basketball season

1998–99 North Carolina Tar Heels men's basketball

NCAA tournament, Round of 64
- Conference: Atlantic Coast Conference

Ranking
- Coaches: No. 18
- AP: No. 13
- Record: 24–10 (10–6 ACC)
- Head coach: Bill Guthridge (2nd season)
- Assistant coaches: Phil Ford (11th season); Dave Hanners (9th season); Pat Sullivan (2nd season)
- Home arena: Dean Smith Center

1998–99 ACC men's basketball standings
	Conf.				Overall
Team	W		L	PCT	W		L	PCT
No. 1 Duke †	16	–	0	1.000	37	–	2	.949
No. 5 Maryland	13	–	3	.813	28	–	6	.824
No. 13 North Carolina	10	–	6	.625	24	–	10	.706
Wake Forest	7	–	9	.438	17	–	14	.548
NC State	6	–	10	.375	19	–	14	.576
Georgia Tech	6	–	10	.375	15	–	16	.484
Clemson	5	–	11	.313	20	–	15	.571
Florida State	5	–	11	.313	13	–	17	.433
Virginia	4	–	12	.250	14	–	16	.467
† 1999 ACC tournament winner Rankings from AP Poll

The 1998–99 North Carolina Tar Heels men's basketball team represented the University of North Carolina at Chapel Hill during the 1998–99 NCAA Division I men's basketball season. The team's head coach was Bill Guthridge, who was in his second season as UNC's head men's basketball coach. The Tar Heels played their home games at the Dean Smith Center in Chapel Hill, North Carolina as members of the Atlantic Coast Conference.

After a third-place finish during the conference regular season, the Tar Heels advanced to the ACC tournament title game where they fell to Duke. North Carolina received an at-large bid to the NCAA tournament as No. 3 seed in the West region, but were upset by Weber State in the opening round to finish 24–10 (10–6 ACC).

== Roster ==
1998–99 North Carolina Tar Heels men's basketball team
Players
Coaches

Pos.	#	Name	Height	Weight	Year	Previous school	Hometown
C	00	Brendan Haywood	6 ft 11 in (2.11 m)	265 lb (120 kg)	So	Dudley	Greensboro, North Carolina
G	5	Ed Cota	6 ft 1 in (1.85 m)	177 lb (80 kg)	Jr	St. Thomas More School	Brooklyn, New York
G	11	Michael Booker	6 ft 5 in (1.96 m)	193 lb (88 kg)	So	Brentwood Academy	Sandersville, Georgia
F/C	13	Ademola Okulaja	6 ft 9 in (2.06 m)	231 lb (105 kg)	Sr	John F. Kennedy High School	Berlin, Germany
G	21	Terrence Newby	6 ft 2 in (1.88 m)	207 lb (94 kg)	Jr	Jordan-Matthews	Siler City, North Carolina
G	22	Scott Williams	5 ft 11 in (1.8 m)	156 lb (71 kg)	Sr	Lawrence	Lawrence, Kansas
G	22	Ronald Curry	6 ft 2 in (1.88 m)	200 lb (91 kg)	Fr	Hampton	Hampton, Virginia
F	24	Max Owens	6 ft 4 in (1.93 m)	195 lb (88 kg)	So	Mount Zion Academy	Macon, Georgia
G/F	25	Jason Capel	6 ft 8 in (2.03 m)	220 lb (100 kg)	Fr	St. John's Prospect Hall	Fayetteville, North Carolina
F	32	Orlando Meléndez	6 ft 7 in (2.01 m)	190 lb (86 kg)	So	McDowell	Juana Díaz, Puerto Rico
F	35	Brad Frederick	6 ft 5 in (1.96 m)	195 lb (88 kg)	Sr	Lawrence	Lawrence, Kansas
F/C	50	Brian Bersticker	6 ft 11 in (2.11 m)	210 lb (95 kg)	So	Kempsville	Virginia Beach, Virginia

Head coach

- Bill Guthridge (Kansas State)

Assistant coach(es)

- Phil Ford (North Carolina)
- Dave Hanners (North Carolina)
- Pat Sullivan (North Carolina)

Legend

- (C) Team captain
- (S) Suspended
- (I) Ineligible
- (W) Walk-on
- Injured
- Current redshirt

Roster

== Schedule and results ==
Date time, TV	Rank^{#}	Opponent^{#}	Result	Record	Site city, state
Non-conference regular season
Nov 13, 1998*	No. 11	Appalachian State	W 87–64	1–0	Dean Smith Center; Chapel Hill, North Carolina
Nov 16, 1998*	No. 10	Florida International	W 65–44	2–0	Dean Smith Center; Chapel Hill, North Carolina
Nov 18, 1998*	No. 10	Georgia	W 65–58	3–0	Dean Smith Center; Chapel Hill, North Carolina
Nov 23, 1998*	No. 9	at Hampton	W 86–75	4–0	Convocation Center; Hampton, Virginia
Nov 25, 1998*	No. 9	vs. No. 14 Purdue; Preseason NIT	W 54–47	5–0	Madison Square Garden; New York, New York
Nov 27, 1998*	No. 9	vs. No. 3 Stanford; Preseason NIT	W 57–49	6–0	Madison Square Garden; New York, New York
Nov 30, 1998*	No. 3	at Middle Tennessee	W 75–54	7–0	Murphy Center; Murfreesboro, Tennessee
Dec 4, 1998*	No. 3	vs. Old Dominion	W 63–61	8–0	Charlotte Coliseum; Charlotte, North Carolina
Dec 5, 1998*	No. 3	vs. College of Charleston	L 64–66	8–1	Charlotte Coliseum; Charlotte, North Carolina
Dec 8, 1998*	No. 7	Buffalo	W 98–49	9–1	Dean Smith Center; Chapel Hill, North Carolina
Dec 12, 1998*	No. 7	UNC Charlotte	W 75–73 ^{OT}	10–1	Dean Smith Center; Chapel Hill, North Carolina
Dec 17, 1998*	No. 7	Louisville	W 77–72	11–1	Dean Smith Center; Chapel Hill, North Carolina
Dec 19, 1998*	No. 7	at Dartmouth	W 82–68	12–1	Leede Arena; Hanover, New Hampshire
ACC Regular Season
Dec 22, 1998	No. 7	at Georgia Tech	L 64–66	12–2 (0–1)	Alexander Memorial Coliseum; Atlanta, Georgia
Dec 29, 1998*	No. 9	at California	L 71–78	12–3	The Arena in Oakland; Berkeley, California
Jan 2, 1999	No. 9	No. 14 Clemson	W 69–53	13–3 (1–1)	Dean Smith Center; Chapel Hill, North Carolina
Jan 5, 1999	No. 11	at Florida State	W 72–54	14–3 (2–1)	Donald L. Tucker Center; Tallahassee, Florida
Jan 13, 1999	No. 9	No. 5 Maryland	L 76–89	14–4 (2–2)	Dean Smith Center; Chapel Hill, North Carolina
Jan 16, 1999	No. 9	at NC State	W 59–56	15–4 (3–2)	Reynolds Coliseum; Raleigh, North Carolina
Jan 21, 1999	No. 10	Virginia	W 71–47	16–4 (4–2)	Dean Smith Center; Chapel Hill, North Carolina
Jan 23, 1999	No. 10	at Wake Forest	W 52–40	17–4 (5–2)	Lawrence Joel Coliseum; Winston-Salem, North Carolina
Jan 27, 1999	No. 10	at No. 2 Duke	L 77–89	17–5 (5–3)	Cameron Indoor Stadium; Durham, North Carolina
Jan 31, 1999	No. 10	Georgia Tech	W 75–66	18–5 (6–3)	Dean Smith Center; Chapel Hill, North Carolina
Feb 4, 1999	No. 12	at Clemson	L 63–78	18–6 (6–4)	Littlejohn Coliseum; Clemson, South Carolina
Feb 7, 1999	No. 12	Florida State	W 98–64	19–6 (7–4)	Dean Smith Center; Chapel Hill, North Carolina
Feb 13, 1999	No. 12	at No. 7 Maryland	L 64–81	19–7 (7–5)	Cole Fieldhouse; College Park, Maryland
Feb 17, 1999	No. 14	NC State	W 62–53	20–7 (8–5)	Dean Smith Center; Chapel Hill, North Carolina
Feb 20, 1999	No. 14	at Virginia	W 67–66	21–7 (9–5)	University Hall; Charlottesville, Virginia
Feb 23, 1999	No. 14	Wake Forest	W 68–65 ^{OT}	22–7 (10–5)	Dean Smith Center; Chapel Hill, North Carolina
Feb 27, 1999	No. 14	No. 1 Duke	L 61–81	22–8 (10–6)	Dean Smith Center; Chapel Hill, North Carolina
ACC Tournament
Mar 5, 1999*	(3) No. 15	vs. (6) Georgia Tech; Quarterfinals	W 78–49	23–8	Charlotte Coliseum; Charlotte, North Carolina
Mar 6, 1999*	(3) No. 15	vs. (2) No. 5 Maryland; Semifinals	W 86–79	24–8	Charlotte Coliseum; Charlotte, North Carolina
Mar 7, 1999*	(3) No. 15	vs. (1) No. 1 Duke; Championship Game	L 73–96	24–9	Charlotte Coliseum; Charlotte, North Carolina
NCAA tournament
Mar 11, 1999*	(3 W) No. 13	vs. (14 W) Weber State; First Round	L 74–76	24–10	KeyArena; Seattle, Washington
*Non-conference game. ^{#}Rankings from AP poll. (#) Tournament seedings in parentheses. W=West region. All times are in Eastern Time.

== Rankings ==
Ranking movements Legend: ██ Increase in ranking ██ Decrease in ranking
	Week																		
Poll	Pre	1	2	3	4	5	6	7	8	9	10	11	12	13	14	15	16	17	Final
AP	11	10	9	3	7	7	7	9	11	9	10	10	12	12	14	14	15	13	Not released
Coaches	11	11^	8	3	6	6	6	9	10	7	8	9	9	10	12	14	15	13	18

^Coaches did not release a Week 1 poll.
