= 1998–99 Maryland Terrapins men's basketball team =

American college basketball season

1998–99 Maryland Terrapins men's basketball

BB&T Classic Champions

NCAA tournament, Sweet Sixteen
- Conference: Atlantic Coast Conference

Ranking
- Coaches: No. 8
- AP: No. 5
- Record: 28–6 (13–3 ACC)
- Head coach: Gary Williams (10th season)
- Assistant coach: Billy Hahn; Dave Dickerson; Jimmy Patsos; Troy Wainwright
- Home arena: Cole Field House

1998–99 ACC men's basketball standings
	Conf.				Overall
Team	W		L	PCT	W		L	PCT
No. 1 Duke †	16	–	0	1.000	37	–	2	.949
No. 5 Maryland	13	–	3	.813	28	–	6	.824
No. 13 North Carolina	10	–	6	.625	24	–	10	.706
Wake Forest	7	–	9	.438	17	–	14	.548
NC State	6	–	10	.375	19	–	14	.576
Georgia Tech	6	–	10	.375	15	–	16	.484
Clemson	5	–	11	.313	20	–	15	.571
Florida State	5	–	11	.313	13	–	17	.433
Virginia	4	–	12	.250	14	–	16	.467
† 1999 ACC tournament winner Rankings from AP Poll

The 1998–99 Maryland Terrapins men's basketball team represented the University of Maryland in the 1998–1999 college basketball season as a member of the Atlantic Coast Conference (ACC). The team was led by head coach Gary Williams and played their home games at the Cole Field House. Ranked as high as #2 in the AP and Coaches' polls, the team finished 28–6, 13–3 in ACC play and lost in the semifinals of the ACC tournament to UNC. They received an at-large bid as a number 2 seed in the 1999 NCAA tournament, where they lost to St. John's in the Sweet Sixteen. Official highlights of the season can now be viewed online.

== Pre-season ==
=== Accolades ===
Team
AP ranked Preseason #6 team.

Obinna Ekezie
Preseason All-American
Laron Profit
Preseason All-American

== Roster ==
1998–99 Maryland Terrapins men's basketball team
Players
Coaches

Pos.	#	Name	Height	Weight	Year	Hometown
G/F	3	Laron Profit	6 ft 5 in (1.96 m)	202 lb (92 kg)	Sr	Charleston, South Carolina
G	5	Juan Dixon	6 ft 3 in (1.91 m)	152 lb (69 kg)	Fr	Baltimore, Maryland
G	12	Terrell Stokes	6 ft 0 in (1.83 m)	187 lb (85 kg)	Sr	Philadelphia
G	15	Danny Miller	6 ft 8 in (2.03 m)	205 lb (93 kg)	Fr	Mt. Holly, New Jersey
G	20	Matt Hahn	6 ft 0 in (1.83 m)	162 lb (73 kg)	Jr	Columbia, Maryland
F	21	LaRon Cephas	6 ft 7 in (2.01 m)	223 lb (101 kg)	So	Wilmington, Delaware
G	23	Steve Francis	6 ft 3 in (1.91 m)	194 lb (88 kg)	Jr	Takoma Park, Maryland
G	31	Norman Fields	6 ft 0 in (1.83 m)	185 lb (84 kg)	Sr	Mt. Vernon, New York
F/C	33	Mike Mardesich	7 ft 0 in (2.13 m)	255 lb (116 kg)	So	Boston, Massachusetts
F	35	Lonny Baxter	6 ft 8 in (2.03 m)	225 lb (102 kg)	Fr	Silver Spring, Maryland
F	44	Terence Morris	6 ft 9 in (2.06 m)	205 lb (93 kg)	So	Frederick, Maryland
F/C	45	Brian Watkins	6 ft 9 in (2.06 m)	229 lb (104 kg)	Sr	Nashville, Tennessee
F/C	54	Obinna Ekezie	6 ft 10 in (2.08 m)	262 lb (119 kg)	Sr	Port Harcourt, Nigeria

Head coach

- Gary Williams (Maryland)

Assistant coach(es)

- Billy Hahn (Maryland)
- Dave Dickerson (Maryland)
- Jimmy Patsos (Catholic)
- Troy Wainwright (Maryland)

Legend

- (C) Team captain
- (S) Suspended
- (I) Ineligible
- (W) Walk-on
- Injured
- Current redshirt

Roster
Last update: 2011-04-29

== Season Recap ==
With nearly all of its starters returning and a #6 preseason ranking, the Maryland Terrapins men's basketball team began the 1998–99 season with high expectations for a successful season and a deep run in the NCAA tournament. In their opening game, the team broke its record for margin of victory in a 113–46 victory against Western Carolina (a record that would be broken six weeks later with a 75-point victory over North Texas ). The Terrapins also went 6–0 against nonconference opponents at home, increasing their nonconference home winning streak to 64, the longest in the country at the time.

The team participated in two preseason tournaments, winning both. They defeated AU-Puerto Rico, UCLA, and Pittsburgh in the Puerto Rico shootout, and Stanford and Depaul in the 4-team BB&T Classic. Their first loss of the season came in Lexington against Tubby Smith's #5 ranked Kentucky Wildcats.

In ACC play, the team outscored its opponents by an average of 17.4 points in victories while posting an overall home record of 13–1 (7–1), its lone home loss coming against Duke. The team would finish 2nd in the ACC regular season standings with a 13–3 record, Maryland's best run since the 1994–95 season. In the 1999 ACC Tournament, the Terrapins defeated Florida State before losing to North Carolina in the semifinals.

The Terrapins received a #2 seed in the South region on the NCAA tournament – the highest seed ever received by a Gary Williams team – and breezed through their first two matches against Valparaiso and Creighton. However, in the regional semifinals, the team struggled against #3 seed St. Johns, ending the first half of the game in a nearly eight-minute scoring drought. Maryland lost 76–62 and once again failed to advance past the Sweet Sixteen.

=== Accolades ===
Steve Francis
2nd Team All-American
Naismith and Wooden Award Finalist
1st Team All-ACC
ACC All-Tournament Team

Terrence Morris
Honorable Mention All-American
1st Team All-ACC

Laron Profit
Honorable Mention All-American

Lonny Baxter & Juan Dixon
ACC All-Freshmen Honorable Mention

=== Draft ===
Round	Pick	Player	NBA club
1	2	Steve Francis	Vancouver Grizzlies
2	37	Obinna Ekezie	Vancouver Grizzlies
2	38	Laron Profit	Orlando Magic

== Schedule ==
Date time, TV	Rank^{#}	Opponent^{#}	Result	Record	High points	High rebounds	High assists	Site (attendance) city, state
Exhibition
11/04/98*		Aussie All-Stars	W 90–59	–	17 – Profit	14 – Ekezie	6 – Profit	Cole Field House (12,486); College Park, Maryland
11/11/98*		California All-Stars	W 95–83	–	18 – Francis	13 – Ekezie	6 – Francis	Cole Field House (NA); College Park, Maryland
Regular season
11/14/98*	No. 6	Western Carolina	W 113–46	1–0	19 – Ekezie	9 – Dixon	15 – Stokes	Cole Field House (14,500); College Park, Maryland
11/17/98*	No. 6	UMBC	W 90–62	2–0	19 – Morris	11 – Ekezie	8 – Profit	Cole Field House (13,865); College Park, Maryland
11/20/98*	No. 6	Hofstra	W 89–59	3–0	23 – Ekezie	11 – Ekezie	9 – Stokes	Cole Field House (14,500); College Park, Maryland
11/23/98*	No. 5	Duquesne	W 81–47	4–0	18 – Morris	7 – Profit	4 – Dixon, Profit, Stokes	Cole Field House (14,500); College Park, Maryland
11/26/98*	No. 5	vs. American-Puerto Rico; Puerto Rico Shootout	W 82–32	5–0	14 – Dixon, Miller	8 – Ekezie	7 – Stokes	Eugenio Guerra Sports Complex (3,000); San Juan, Puerto Rico
11/27/98*	No. 5	vs. No. 10 UCLA; Puerto Rico Shootout	W 70–54	6–0	22 – Morris	11 – Morris	6 – Profit	Eugenio Guerra Sports Complex (3,000); San Juan, Puerto Rico
11/28/98*	No. 5	vs. Pittsburgh; Puerto Rico Shootout	W 87–52	7–0	23 – Profit	8 – Mardesich, Morris	8 – Stokes	Eugenio Guerra Sports Complex (3,000); San Juan, Puerto Rico
12/03/98	No. 2	Wake Forest	W 92–69	8–0 (1–0)	18 – Francis	7 – Baxter	8 – Stokes	Cole Field House (14,500); College Park, Maryland
12/06/98*	No. 2	vs. No. 5 Stanford; BB&T Classic	W 62–60	9–0	24 – Francis	7 – Francis	3 – Morris, Stokes	MCI Center (20,544); Washington, D.C.
12/07/98*	No. 2	vs. DePaul; BB&T Classic	W 92–75	10–0	22 – Morris	6 – Morris	4 – Stokes	MCI Center (18,244); Washington, D.C.
12/12/98*	No. 2	at No. 5 Kentucky	L 91–103	10–1	26 – Morris	9 – Ekezie	5 – Francis	Rupp Arena (24,321); Lexington, Kentucky
12/19/98*	No. 5	vs. Princeton	W 81–58	11–1	21 – Profit	6 – Francis	4 – Francis, Stokes	Baltimore Arena (13,489); Baltimore
12/23/98*	No. 5	North Texas	W 132–57	12–1	28 – Baxter	15 – Ekezie	9 – Stokes	Cole Field House (14,500); College Park, Maryland
12/27/98*	No. 5	South Carolina State	W 104–70	13–1	25 – Profit	9 – Mardesich	12 – Stokes	Cole Field House (14,500); College Park, Maryland
01/03/99	No. 4	No. 2 Duke	L 64–82	13–2 (1–1)	16 – Morris	9 – Morris, Profit	7 – Francis	Cole Field House (14,500); College Park, Maryland
01/07/99	No. 5	at Virginia	W 71–66	14–2 (2–1)	17 – Ekezie, Morris	7 – Ekezie	6 – Francis	University Hall (8,268); Charlottesville, Virginia
01/10/99	No. 5	NC State	W 94–48	15–2 (3–1)	22 – Francis	6 – Morris	9 – Stokes	Cole Field House (14,500); College Park, Maryland
01/13/99	No. 5	at No. 9 North Carolina	W 89–76	16–2 (4–1)	24 – Profit	6 – Francis	8 – Stokes	Dean E. Smith Center (21,572); Chapel Hill, North Carolina
01/19/99	No. 4	Georgia Tech	W 77–62	17–2 (5–1)	20 – Morris	10 – Morris	7 – Stokes	Cole Field House (14,500); College Park, Maryland
01/24/99	No. 4	at Clemson	W 81–79 ^{OT}	18–2 (6–1)	26 – Morris	5 – Morris	5 – Stokes	Littlejohn Coliseum (11,200); Clemson, South Carolina
01/27/99	No. 4	Florida State	W 107–87	19–2 (7–1)	22 – Ekezie	6 – Morris	9 – Stokes	Cole Field House (14,500); College Park, Maryland
01/31/99	No. 4	at Wake Forest	L 72–85	19–3 (7–2)	18 – Dixon	11 – Morris	5 – Francis, Stokes	Lawrence Joel Veterans Memorial Coliseum (13,679); Winston-Salem, North Carolina
02/03/99	No. 7	at No. 2 Duke	L 77–95	19–4 (7–3)	18 – Francis, Profit	7 – Francis, Morris, Stokes	6 – Stokes	Cameron Indoor Stadium (9,314); Durham, North Carolina
02/06/99	No. 7	Virginia	W 88–72	20–4 (8–3)	16 – Morris	8 – Morris	13 – Francis	Cole Field House (14,500); College Park, Maryland
02/10/99	No. 7	at NC State	W 63–50	21–4 (9–3)	17 – Morris	16 – Morris	5 – Stokes	Reynolds Coliseum (12,400); Raleigh, North Carolina
02/13/99	No. 7	North Carolina	W 81–64	22–4 (10–3)	24 – Profit	6 – Francis	8 – Stokes	Cole Field House (14,500); College Park, Maryland
02/21/99	No. 5	at Georgia Tech	W 91–60	23–4 (11–3)	22 – Francis	6 – Baxter, Morris	5 – Stokes	Alexander Memorial Coliseum (7,963); Atlanta
02/24/99	No. 5	Clemson	W 77–60	24–4 (12–3)	32 – Francis	8 – Francis	9 – Stokes	Cole Field House (14,500); College Park, Maryland
02/27/99	No. 5	at Florida State	W 84–75	25–4 (13–3)	32 – Profit	7 – Morris, Profit	5 – Stokes	Tallahassee–Leon County Civic Center (6,899); Tallahassee, Florida
ACC tournament
03/05/99	No. 5	vs. Florida State; Quarterfinal	W 93–69	26–4	21 – Profit	10 – Profit	6 – Stokes	Charlotte Coliseum (23,895); Charlotte, North Carolina
03/06/99	No. 5	vs. No. 15 North Carolina; Semifinal	L 79–86	26–5	31 – Francis	8 – Morris	5 – Stokes	Charlotte Coliseum (23,895); Charlotte, North Carolina
1999 NCAA men's basketball tournament
03/11/99*		vs. Valparaiso; NCAA First Round	W 82–60	27–5	18 – Morris, Profit	10 – Morris	7 – Francis	Orlando Arena (9,221); Orlando, Florida
03/13/99*		vs. Creighton; NCAA Second Round	W 75–63	28–5	20 – Morris	13 – Francis	5 – Morris	Orlando Arena (14,959); Orlando, Florida
03/18/99*		vs. St. John's; NCAA Sweet 16	L 62–76	28–6	13 – Francis	8 – Baxter, Profit	7 – Stokes	Thompson–Boling Arena (20,000); Knoxville, Tennessee
*Non-conference game. ^{#}Rankings from AP Poll. (#) Tournament seedings in parentheses. All times are in Eastern Time.

== Rankings ==
Poll	Pre	Wk 1	Wk 2	Wk 3	Wk 4	Wk 5	Wk 6	Wk 7	Wk 8	Wk 9	Wk 10	Wk 11	Wk 12	Wk 13	Wk 14	Wk 15	Wk 16	Final
AP	6	6	5	2	2	5	5	4	5	5	4	4	7	7	5	5	5	5
Coaches	5	5	5	2	2	5	5	4	6	5	4	4	6	7	5	5	5	8
