= 1998–99 Arizona Wildcats men's basketball team =

American college basketball season

1998–99 Arizona Wildcats men's basketball

NCAA tournament, Round of 64
- Conference: Pacific-10 Conference

Ranking
- Coaches: No. 16
- AP: No. 12
- Record: 22–7 (13–5 Pac-10)
- Head coach: Lute Olson (16th season)
- Assistant coaches: Jim Rosborough (10th season); Rodney Tention (2nd season)
- Home arena: McKale Center

1998–99 Pacific-10 Conference men's basketball standings
	Conf.				Overall
Team	W		L	PCT	W		L	PCT
No. 7 Stanford	15	–	3	.833	26	–	7	.788
No. 12 Arizona	13	–	5	.722	22	–	7	.759
No. 15 UCLA	12	–	6	.667	22	–	9	.710
Washington	10	–	8	.556	17	–	12	.586
California	8	–	10	.444	22	–	11	.667
Oregon	8	–	10	.444	19	–	13	.594
USC	7	–	11	.389	15	–	13	.536
Oregon State	7	–	11	.389	13	–	14	.481
Arizona State	6	–	12	.333	14	–	16	.467
Washington State	4	–	14	.222	10	–	19	.345
As of July 26, 2011; Rankings from AP Poll

The 1998–99 Arizona Wildcats men's basketball team represented the University of Arizona in the 1998–99 NCAA Division I men's basketball season. The head coach was Lute Olson. The team played its home games in the McKale Center in Tucson, Arizona, and was a member of the Pacific-10 Conference. The Wildcats finished the season in second place in the Pacific-10 conference with a 13–5 record. Arizona reached the 1999 NCAA Division I men's basketball tournament, losing to Oklahoma in the first round and finishing the season with a 22–7 record.

== Roster ==
1998–99 Arizona Wildcats men's basketball team
Players
Coaches

Pos.	#	Name	Height	Weight	Year	Hometown
F	12	Josh Pastner	5 ft 11 in (1.8 m)	175 lb (79 kg)	Jr	Glen Dale, West Virginia
C	13	Donnell Harris	6 ft 11 in (2.11 m)	205 lb (93 kg)	Sr	Salinas, California
G	15	John Ash	5 ft 11 in (1.8 m)	170 lb (77 kg)	Jr	Tucson, Arizona
G	24	Quynn Tebbs	6 ft 1 in (1.85 m)	180 lb (82 kg)	RS So	Salt Lake City, Utah
F	30	Justin Wessel	6 ft 8 in (2.03 m)	225 lb (102 kg)	RS So	Cedar Rapids, Iowa
G	31	Jason Terry	6 ft 2 in (1.88 m)	170 lb (77 kg)	Sr	Seattle, Washington
F	33	Eugene Edgerson	6 ft 6 in (1.98 m)	220 lb (100 kg)	Jr	New Orleans, Louisiana
F	35	Rick Anderson	6 ft 9 in (2.06 m)	213 lb (97 kg)	Fr	Long Beach, California
C	42	AJ Bramlett	6 ft 11 in (2.11 m)	215 lb (98 kg)	Sr	Albuquerque, New Mexico
F	44	Richard Jefferson	6 ft 7 in (2.01 m)	222 lb (101 kg)	Fr	Phoenix, Arizona
G	52	Jason Steward	5 ft 11 in (1.8 m)	165 lb (75 kg)	Sr	Gardena, California

Head coach

- Lute Olson (Augsburg)

Assistant coach(es)

- Jim Rosborough (associate head coach) (Iowa)
- Rodney Tention (San Francisco)
- Jay John (Arizona)

Legend

- (C) Team captain
- (S) Suspended
- (I) Ineligible
- (W) Walk-on
- Injured
- Current redshirt

Roster

== Schedule and results ==
Date time, TV	Rank^{#}	Opponent^{#}	Result	Record	Site (attendance) city, state
Regular season
Nov 13, 1998*	No. 18	vs. No. 9 Tennessee	W 73–72	1–0	The Pit; Albuquerque, New Mexico
Nov 25, 1998*	No. 11	Texas	W 73–57	2–0	McKale Center; Tucson, Arizona
Nov 28, 1998*	No. 11	at BYU	W 78–74 ^{OT}	3–0	Marriott Center; Provo, Utah
Dec 5, 1998*	No. 13	vs. Wyoming	W 94–84	4–0	US Airways Center; Phoenix, Arizona
Dec 14, 1998*	No. 8	UC Irvine	W 93–70	5–0	McKale Center; Tucson, Arizona
Dec 19, 1998*	No. 8	vs. Iowa State; Las Vegas Shootout	W 75–61	6–0	Thomas & Mack Center; Las Vegas, Nevada
Dec 28, 1998*	No. 8	Holy Cross	W 89–41	7–0	McKale Center; Tucson, Arizona
Dec 30, 1998*	No. 6	Florida International	W 91–75	8–0	McKale Center; Tucson, Arizona
Jan 2, 1999	No. 6	at No. 10 UCLA; Rivalry	L 75–82	8–1 (0–1)	Pauley Pavilion; Los Angeles, California
Jan 4, 1999	No. 6	at USC	W 87–78	9–1 (1–1)	L.A. Sports Arena; Los Angeles, California
Jan 7, 1999	No. 8	Washington State	W 98–87	10–1 (2–1)	McKale Center; Tucson, Arizona
Jan 9, 1999	No. 8	Washington	W 88–86	11–1 (3–1)	McKale Center; Tucson, Arizona
Jan 14, 1999	No. 7	at Arizona State; Rivalry	W 74–73	12–1 (4–1)	Wells Fargo Arena; Tempe, Arizona
Jan 16, 1999*	No. 7	at No. 16 New Mexico	L 78–79	12–2	The Pit; Albuquerque, New Mexico
Jan 21, 1999	No. 9	at Oregon	W 85–83	13–2 (5–1)	McArthur Court; Eugene, Oregon
Jan 24, 1999	No. 9	at Oregon State	L 59–60	13–3 (5–2)	Gill Coliseum; Corvallis, Oregon
Jan 28, 1999	No. 13	No. 3 Stanford	W 78–76	14–3 (6–2)	McKale Center; Tucson, Arizona
Jan 30, 1999	No. 13	California	W 91–74	15–3 (7–2)	McKale Center; Tucson, Arizona
Feb 4, 1999	No. 10	at Washington	L 84–90	15–4 (7–3)	Bank of America Arena; Seattle, Washington
Feb 6, 1999	No. 10	at Washington State	W 81–79	16–4 (8–3)	Friel Court; Pullman, Washington
Feb 10, 1999	No. 10	Arizona State; Rivalry	W 86–80	17–4 (9–3)	McKale Center; Tucson, Arizona
Feb 13, 1999*	No. 10	LSU	W 78–71	18–4	McKale Center; Tucson, Arizona
Feb 18, 1999	No. 8	Oregon State	W 89–72	19–4 (10–3)	McKale Center; Tucson, Arizona
Feb 20, 1999	No. 8	Oregon	W 92–86	20–4 (11–3)	McKale Center; Tucson, Arizona
Feb 25, 1999	No. 7	at California	L 76–89	20–5 (11–4)	Oracle Arena; Oakland, California
Feb 27, 1999	No. 7	at No. 6 Stanford	L 83–98	20–6 (11–5)	Maples Pavilion; Stanford, California
Mar 4, 1999	No. 13	USC	W 88–73	21–6 (12–5)	McKale Center; Tucson, Arizona
Mar 6, 1999	No. 13	No. 12 UCLA; Rivalry	W 87–70	22–6 (13–5)	McKale Center; Tucson, Arizona
NCAA tournament
Mar 12, 1999*	(4 MW) No. 12	vs. (13 MW) Oklahoma; First Round	L 60–61	22–7	Bradley Center; Milwaukee, Wisconsin
*Non-conference game. ^{#}Rankings from AP Poll. (#) Tournament seedings in parentheses. MW=Midwest. All times are in Mountain Time.
