= 1998–99 Stanford Cardinal men's basketball team =

American college basketball season

1998–99 Stanford Cardinal men's basketball

Pacific-10 Regular Season Champions

1999 NCAA Division I men's basketball tournament, second round
- Conference: Pacific-10 Conference

Ranking
- Coaches: No. 9
- AP: No. 7
- Record: 26–7 (15–3 Pac-10)
- Head coach: Mike Montgomery (13th season)
- Assistant coaches: Eric Reveno; Trent Johnson; Blaine Taylor
- Home arena: Maples Pavilion (Capacity: 7,392)

1998–99 Pacific-10 Conference men's basketball standings
	Conf.				Overall
Team	W		L	PCT	W		L	PCT
No. 7 Stanford	15	–	3	.833	26	–	7	.788
No. 12 Arizona	13	–	5	.722	22	–	7	.759
No. 15 UCLA	12	–	6	.667	22	–	9	.710
Washington	10	–	8	.556	17	–	12	.586
California	8	–	10	.444	22	–	11	.667
Oregon	8	–	10	.444	19	–	13	.594
USC	7	–	11	.389	15	–	13	.536
Oregon State	7	–	11	.389	13	–	14	.481
Arizona State	6	–	12	.333	14	–	16	.467
Washington State	4	–	14	.222	10	–	19	.345
As of July 26, 2011; Rankings from AP Poll

The 1998–99 Stanford Cardinal men's basketball team represented Stanford University in the 1998–99 NCAA Division I men's basketball season. The team finished 1st in the conference with an overall record of 26–7 and 15–3 (Pac-10). The Cardinal were a #2 seed in the 1999 NCAA Tournament. After a first round victory vs Alcorn St. they were upset by #10 seed Gonzaga 82–74.

== Roster ==
1998–99 Stanford Cardinal men's basketball team
Players
Coaches

Pos.	#	Name	Height	Weight	Year	Previous school	Hometown
G	21	David Moseley	6 ft 4 in (1.93 m)	—	Jr
C	31	Jarron Collins	6 ft 11 in (2.11 m)	240 lb (109 kg)	So	Harvard-Westlake	Los Angeles, California
C	34	Jason Collins	7 ft 0 in (2.13 m)	245 lb (111 kg)	So	Harvard-Westlake	Los Angeles, California
F	45	Mark Madsen	6 ft 9 in (2.06 m)	245 lb (111 kg)	Jr	San Ramon Valley	Danville, California
C	55	Tim Young	7 ft 0 in (2.13 m)	220 lb (100 kg)	Sr	Harbor	Santa Cruz, California

Head coach

- Mike Montgomery (Long Beach State)

Assistant coach(es)

Legend

- (C) Team captain
- (S) Suspended
- (I) Ineligible
- (W) Walk-on
- Injured
- Current redshirt

Roster

== Schedule and results ==
Date time, TV	Rank^{#}	Opponent^{#}	Result	Record	Site (attendance) city, state
Regular season
November 14, 1998*; 7:30 PM	No. 3	UC Davis	W 76–49	1–0	Maples Pavilion; Stanford, CA
November 18, 1998*; 7:35 PM	No. 3	SMU; NIT campus game	W 86–51	2–0	Maples Pavilion; Stanford, CA
November 20, 1998*	No. 3	SW Missouri State; NIT campus game	W 76–51	3–0	Maples Pavilion; Stanford, CA
November 25, 1998*	No. 3	at No. 23 St. John's; NIT First Round	W 55–53	4–0	Madison Square Garden; New York City, NY
November 27, 1998*	No. 3	vs. No. 9 North Carolina; NIT Second Round	L 49–57	4–1	Madison Square Garden; New York City, NY
December 6, 1998*	No. 5	vs. No. 2 Maryland; BB&T Classic	L 60–62	4–2	Capital One Arena; Washington, D.C.
December 7, 1998*	No. 5	at George Washington; BB&T Classic	W 70–56	5–2	Charles E. Smith Center; Washington, D.C.
December 17, 1998*	No. 6	at Nevada	W 101–57	6–2	Maples Pavilion; Stanford, CA
December 19, 1998*; 7:00 PM	No. 6	at Pacific	W 71–58	7–2	Alex G. Spanos Center; Stockton, CA
December 21, 1998*; 6:30 PM	No. 6	Elon; Stanford Invitational	W 82–58	8–2	Maples Pavilion; Stanford, CA
December 22, 1998*	No. 6	Santa Clara; Stanford Invitational	W 94–59	9–2	Maples Pavilion; Stanford, CA
December 29, 1998*	No. 5	vs. Temple; Pete Newell Classic	W 57–50	10–2	The Arena in Oakland; Oakland, CA
January 2, 1999	No. 5	Oregon State	W 72–56	11–2 (1–0)	Maples Pavilion; Stanford, CA
January 4, 1999	No. 5	Oregon	W 77–59	12–2 (2–0)	Maples Pavilion; Stanford, CA
January 9, 1999	No. 4	No. 25 California	W 71–62	13–2 (3–0)	Maples Pavilion; Stanford, CA
January 14, 1999	No. 4	at USC	W 72–55	14–2 (4–0)	Los Angeles Memorial Sports Arena; Los Angeles, CA
January 16, 1999	No. 4	at No. 10 UCLA	W 72–59	15–2 (5–0)	Pauley Pavilion (12,922); Los Angeles, CA
January 21, 1999	No. 3	Washington State	W 94–45	16–2 (6–0)	Maples Pavilion; Stanford, CA
January 23, 1999	No. 3	Washington	W 67–60	17–2 (7–0)	Maples Pavilion; Stanford, CA
January 28, 1999	No. 3	at No. 13 Arizona	L 76–78	17–3 (7–1)	McKale Center; Tucson, AZ
January 30, 1999	No. 3	at Arizona State	W 73–63	18–3 (8–1)	Wells Fargo Arena; Tempe, AZ
February 3, 1999	No. 4	at California	W 57–55	19–3 (9–1)	The Arena in Oakland; Oakland, CA
February 6, 1999*	No. 4	No. 1 Connecticut	L 59–70	19–4	Maples Pavilion; Stanford, CA
February 11, 1999; 7:30 PM	No. 6	No. 9 UCLA	W 77–73	20–4 (10–1)	Maples Pavilion; Stanford, CA
February 13, 1999	No. 6	USC	L 82–86 ^{OT}	20–5 (10–2)	Maples Pavilion; Stanford, CA
February 18, 1999	No. 7	at Washington	W 89–57	21–5 (11–2)	Hec Edmundson Pavilion; Seattle, WA
February 20, 1999	No. 7	at Washington State	W 64–58	22–5 (12–2)	Beasley Coliseum; Pullman, WA
February 25, 1999	No. 6	Arizona State	W 87–77 ^{OT}	23–5 (13–2)	Maples Pavilion; Stanford, CA
February 27, 1999	No. 6	No. 7 Arizona	W 98–83	24–5 (14–2)	Maples Pavilion; Stanford, CA
March 4, 1999	No. 6	at Oregon	W 73–61	25–5 (15–2)	McArthur Court; Eugene, OR
March 6, 1999	No. 6	at Oregon State	L 45–59	25–6 (15–3)	Gill Coliseum; Corvallis, OR
NCAA tournament
March 11, 1999*; 2:10 pm, CBS	(2 W) No. 7	(15 W) Alcorn State; First round	W 69–57	26–6	KeyArena at Seattle Center; Seattle, WA
March 13, 1999*; 1:30 pm, CBS	(2 W) No. 7	(10 W) Gonzaga; Second round	L 74–82	26–7	KeyArena at Seattle Center (15,187); Seattle, WA
*Non-conference game. ^{#}Rankings from AP Poll. (#) Tournament seedings in parentheses. W=West Regional. All times are in Pacific Time.

Schedule Source:

== Rankings ==
Ranking movements Legend: ██ Increase in ranking ██ Decrease in ranking
	Week																		
Poll	Pre	1	2	3	4	5	6	7	8	9	10	11	12	13	14	15	16	17	Final
AP	3	3	3	5	6	6	6	5	4	4	3	3	4	6	7	6	6	7	Not released
Coaches	2	2^	2	5	7	7	7	5	4	4	3	3	4	6	8	6	6	7	9

*AP does not release post-NCAA Tournament rankings
^Coaches did not release a week 2 poll

== 1999 NBA draft ==
Round	Pick	Player	NBA Team
2	56	Tim Young	Golden State Warriors
