= 1995 McDonald's All-American Boys Game =

American high school basketball game

West	East
126	115
	1st half	2nd half	Total
West	63	63	126
East	56	59	115
- Date: April 2, 1995
- Venue: Kiel Center, St. Louis, MO
- MVP: Kevin Garnett
- Referees: 1 Ed Hightower; 2 Steve Welmer; 3 Ron Zetcher
- Attendance: 16,201
- Network: CBS

McDonald's All-American

The 1995 McDonald's All-American Boys Game was an All-star basketball game played on Sunday, April 2, 1995 at the Kiel Center in St. Louis, Missouri. The game's rosters featured the best and most highly recruited high school boys graduating in 1995. The game was the 18th annual version of the McDonald's All-American Game first played in 1978.

== 1995 game ==
The game was telecast live by CBS. Chauncey Billups did not play due to a shoulder injury. Before the game, some of the jerseys of the West team were stolen from the locker room: as a result, Kris Clack had to play with a jersey without his name on the back, and Taymon Domzalski and Paul Pierce had to wear duplicates of Traylor's number 54 and McCoy's number 35, respectively. The first points were scored by East's Sam Okey with a lay-up. The game was dominated by big men, and Kevin Garnett won the MVP award recording 18 points, 11 rebounds, 4 assists and 3 blocks in 22 minutes of play. Other players who starred were Pierce, who was the top scorer of the game with 28 points, Ron Mercer (who played for his coach Steve Smith of Oak Hill Academy), who scored 19 points, and Stephon Marbury who had 11 points and 10 assists. The final score was 126 to 115 but McDonald's lists the result as 125-115. Many players arrived at the game undecided about their college choice. Only one of them declared for the 1995 NBA draft: Kevin Garnett, who became the first player in 20 years to be drafted out of high school with the 5th overall pick in the draft. Of the 22 players selected, 15 played in the NBA.

=== East roster ===
No.	Name	Height	Weight	Position	Hometown	High school	College of Choice
3	Stephon Marbury	6-2	180	G	Brooklyn, NY, U.S.	Lincoln	Georgia Tech
4	Sam Okey	6-7	220	F	Cassville, WI, U.S.	Cassville	Wisconsin
5	Wayne Turner	6-2	180	G	Chestnut Hill, MA, U.S.	Beaver Country Day	Undecided; Committed later to Kentucky.
11	Louis Bullock	6-2	180	G	Laurel, MD, U.S.	Baptist	Michigan
12	Shammgod Wells	6-0	169	G	New York City, NY, U.S.	La Salle Academy	Providence
15	Vince Carter	6-6	195	F	Daytona Beach, FL, U.S.	Mainland	Undecided; Committed later to North Carolina.
23	Randell Jackson	6-11	215	C	Winchendon, MA, U.S.	The Winchendon School	Undecided; Committed later to Florida State.
32	Ron Mercer	6-7	210	F	Mouth of Wilson, VA, U.S.	Oak Hill Academy	Undecided; Committed later to Kentucky.
33	Shareef Abdur-Rahim	6-9	225	F / C	Marietta, GA, U.S.	Wheeler	California
44	Antawn Jamison	6-8	210	F	Charlotte, NC, U.S.	Providence	North Carolina
45	Luther Clay	6-8	225	F	Pittsfield, ME, U.S.	Maine Central Institute	Purdue

=== West roster ===
No.	Name	Height	Weight	Position	Hometown	High school	College of Choice
3	B.J. McKie	6-2	175	G	Columbia, SC, U.S.	Irmo	South Carolina
4	Kris Clack	6-5	185	G	Austin, TX, U.S.	L.C. Anderson	Texas
11	Ryan Robertson	6-5	180	G	St. Charles, MO, U.S.	St. Charles West	Kansas
21	Kevin Garnett	6-10	220	C	Chicago, IL, U.S.	Farragut Academy	Undecided (Did not attend)
35	Jelani McCoy	6-11	225	F	San Diego, CA, U.S.	St. Augustine	UCLA
35	Paul Pierce	6-6	230	F	Inglewood, CA, U.S.	Inglewood	Kansas
44	Albert White	6-6	210	F	Inkster, MI, U.S.	Inkster	Michigan
54	Taymon Domzalski	6-10	245	F	Roswell, NM, U.S.	New Mexico Military Institute	Duke
54	Robert Traylor	6-7	270	C	Detroit, MI, U.S.	Murray-Wright	Undecided; Committed later to Michigan.
55	Derek Hood	6-7	210	F	Kansas City, MO, U.S.	Central	Arkansas
N/A	Chauncey Billups	6-3	202	G	Denver, CO, U.S.	George Washington	Undecided; Committed later to Colorado.

=== Coaches ===
The East team was coached by:

- Head Coach Steve Smith of Oak Hill Academy (Mouth of Wilson, Virginia)

The West team was coached by:

- Head Coach Dave Luechtefeld of Okawville High School (Okawville, Illinois)

== All-American Week ==
=== Schedule ===
- Thursday, March 30: Coca-Cola JamFest
  - Slam Dunk Contest
  - Three-Point Shoot-out
- Sunday, April 2: 18th Annual Boys All-American Game

The Coca-Cola JamFest is a skills-competition evening featuring basketball players who demonstrate their skills in two crowd-entertaining ways. The slam dunk contest was first held in 1987, and a 3-point shooting challenge was added in 1989.

=== Contest winners ===
- The 1995 Slam Dunk contest was won by Vince Carter.
- The 1995 3-point shoot-out was won by Louis Bullock.
