= Kris Clack =

American basketball player (born 1977)

Personal information
- Born: July 6, 1977 (age 49) Austin, Texas, U.S.
- Listed height: 6 ft 5 in (1.96 m)
- Listed weight: 230 lb (104 kg)

Career information
- High school: Anderson (Austin, Texas)
- College: Texas (1995–1999)
- NBA draft: 1999: 2nd round, 55th overall pick
- Drafted by: Boston Celtics
- Position: Small forward

Career history
- 2000: San Diego Stingrays
- 2000–2002: Reggiana
- 2002–2003: Napoli
- 2003–2004: Austin Cyclones
- 2004–2005: Trapani
- 2005–2006: Juvecaserta
- 2006–2007: Austin Toros
- 2008: Albuquerque Thunderbirds

Career highlights
- Third-team All-Big 12 (1999); Second-team All-Big 12 (1998); 2× Big 12 All-Defensive Team (1997, 1998); McDonald's All-American (1995)
- Stats at Basketball Reference

Kristopher George Clack (born July 6, 1977) is an American former professional basketball player, formerly for the University of Texas. He was drafted by the Boston Celtics in 1999 and later went on to play in the Lega Basket Serie A with Pallacanestro Reggiana and Basket Napoli.

== High school ==
Clack participated in the 1995 McDonald's All-American Boys Game.

== College career ==
Clack played for the University of Texas from 1995 to 1999, earning Second Team All-Big 12 honors his junior and senior seasons. During his college career he scored 1,592 points and grabbed 771 rebounds. He was the first McDonald's High School All-American in school history.

== Professional career ==
Clack entered the 1999 NBA draft, and was picked 55th overall by the Boston Celtics, but he never played an NBA game. He signed with the San Diego Stingrays of the International Basketball League in 2000, averaging 11.5 points per game for the team.

After playing for Pallacanestro Reggiana from 2000 to 2002, Clack signed with Basket Napoli in the Italian Lega Basket Serie A for the 2002–03 season where he averaged 11.5 points in 21 games.

Clack spent the 2003–04 season in the United States in the XBL with the Austin Cyclones.

He played for the Austin Toros during the 2006–07 NBA Development League season, averaging 8.5 points in 43 games.

Clack was taken with the 14th pick of the seventh round in the 2008 NBA D-League Draft by the Albuquerque Thunderbirds. In 9 games during the 2008–09 NBA Development League season, he averaged 7.3 points per game.

== National team career ==
Clack played with USA Basketball Men's Junior Select Team during the 1995 Nike Hoop Summit game where he went scoreless in 8 minutes of playing time in USA's 86–77 victory against the World Select Team.
