= Taymon Domzalski =

American basketball player (born 1977)

Personal information
- Born: May 7, 1977 (age 48) Lovington, New Mexico, U.S.
- Listed height: 6 ft 10 in (2.08 m)
- Listed weight: 240 lb (109 kg)

Career information
- High school: New Mexico Military Institute (Roswell, New Mexico)
- College: Duke (1995–1999)
- NBA draft: 1999: undrafted
- Position: Power forward / center
- Number: 40, 13

Career highlights
- ACC All-Freshman team (1996); McDonald's All-American (1995); Second-team Parade All-American (1995)

Jerome Taymon Domzalski (born May 7, 1977) is an American former professional basketball player. At 6-foot, 10-inches, he played center and power forward positions throughout his collegiate and professional basketball career. He is the first and only scholarship athlete to have played for Mike Krzyzewski and also earn a medical degree and become a physician.

== Early life ==
Domzalski grew up in Lovington, New Mexico with future Hall of Fame NFL linebacker Brian Urlacher. Urlacher makes reference to Domzalski in his children's book "The Middle School Rules of Brian Urlacher". There Urlacher describes Domzalski as "a gifted athlete who could do it all" and who brought national attention and excitement to Lovington with visits from famous college coaches including Bobby Knight of Indiana, Roy Williams of Kansas, Mike Krzyzewski of Duke, and Jim Harrick of UCLA who visited their small town of Lovington to check out Taymon in person.

Domzalski transferred to New Mexico Military Institute (NMMI) his senior year of High School. Highly recruited, he turned down offers from UCLA, Kentucky, North Carolina, Kansas, among others, to attend Duke University. Beyond being named to the Parade All-American and McDonald's All-American basketball teams with Kevin Garnett, Paul Pierce, Chauncey Billups, Vince Carter, Antawn Jamison, and Stephon Marbury, Domzalski graduated at the top of his class at NMMI and was named the 1995 Dial Award Winner as the top male student-athlete in the United States along with the top female student-athlete, Olympic gymnast Shannon Miller.

== College career ==
Domzalski played for Mike Krzyzewski's Duke Blue Devils for four years and was named to the ACC All-Freshman team his first season at Duke. Through his years at Duke he played with Shane Battier, Steve Wojciechowski, Jeff Capel, Nate James, Roshown McLeod, Elton Brand, Corey Maggette and was coached by Quin Snyder, Johnny Dawkins, and Tommy Amaker. He helped his teams win three ACC Championships as well as NCAA tournament berths every year, including an Elite Eight finish in 1998 and the Final Four Championship game in 1999. Describing Domzalski in a post-game press conference Virginia Head Coach Pete Gillen said: "Domzalski is big, fast, and can shoot… If he came to Virginia, we'd build a monument to him right next to Jefferson. Maybe not quite as tall."

A true scholar-athlete, Domzalski was named to the Dean's List at Duke, won the team's Dr. Deryl Hart Award for academics, and was awarded the 1998 Paine Webber/ABC Sports National Scholar-Athlete of the Year. He graduated cum laude from Duke University with degrees in History and Chemistry.

== Professional career ==
From 1999 to 2001, Domzalski played basketball professionally in the United States and Europe. In 2000, he was named the IBL Community Man of the Year. After retiring from professional sports, he enrolled in and graduated from the Duke University School of Medicine. He finished his medical training in California, completing the diagnostic radiology residency at the University of Southern California. He is the first and only scholarship athlete to have played for Mike Krzyzewski to earn a medical degree and become a physician. He currently practices medicine in Los Angeles, California.
