= 1998–99 Washington Huskies men's basketball team =

American college basketball season

1998–99 Washington Huskies men's basketball

NCAA tournament, First round
- Conference: Pacific-10 Conference
- Record: 17–12 (10–8 Pac-10)
- Head coach: Bob Bender (6th season)
- Home arena: Hec Edmundson Pavilion

1998–99 Pacific-10 Conference men's basketball standings
| | Conf. | | | | Overall |
| Team | W | | L | PCT | W | | L | PCT |
|---|---|---|---|---|---|---|---|---|
| No. 7 Stanford | 15 | – | 3 | .833 | 26 | – | 7 | .788 |
| No. 12 Arizona | 13 | – | 5 | .722 | 22 | – | 7 | .759 |
| No. 15 UCLA | 12 | – | 6 | .667 | 22 | – | 9 | .710 |
| Washington | 10 | – | 8 | .556 | 17 | – | 12 | .586 |
| California | 8 | – | 10 | .444 | 22 | – | 11 | .667 |
| Oregon | 8 | – | 10 | .444 | 19 | – | 13 | .594 |
| USC | 7 | – | 11 | .389 | 15 | – | 13 | .536 |
| Oregon State | 7 | – | 11 | .389 | 13 | – | 14 | .481 |
| Arizona State | 6 | – | 12 | .333 | 14 | – | 16 | .467 |
| Washington State | 4 | – | 14 | .222 | 10 | – | 19 | .345 |
As of July 26, 2011; Rankings from AP Poll

The 1998–99 Washington Huskies men's basketball team represented the University of Washington for the 1998–99 NCAA Division I men's basketball season. Led by sixth-year head coach Bob Bender, the Huskies were members of the Pacific-10 Conference and played their home games on campus at Hec Edmundson Pavilion in Seattle, Washington.

The Huskies were 17–11 overall in the regular season and 10–8 in conference play, fourth in the standings. There was no conference tournament this season; last played in 1990, it resumed in 2002.

Washington made the NCAA tournament for the second straight year. Seeded seventh in the Midwest regional, they met tenth seed Miami (OH) in the Louisiana Superdome in New Orleans and lost by a point. Wally Szczerbiak led the scoring for Miami with 43 points; his teammates scored only sixteen. Washington's next NCAA appearance was five years later in 2004.

Built over seventy years earlier in 1927, Hec Edmundson Pavilion underwent a renovation following this season and reopened in November 2000. The Huskies' home court for the 1999–2000 season was KeyArena at Seattle Center, the home of the NBA's Seattle SuperSonics.

== Postseason results ==
| Date time, TV | Opponent | Result | Record | Site (attendance) city, state |
NCAA tournament
| Fri, March 12*; 11:40 am, CBS | vs. (10M) Miami (OH); First round | L 58–59 | 17–12 | Louisiana Superdome; New Orleans, Louisiana |
*Non-conference game. ^{#}Rankings from AP poll. (#) Tournament seedings in parentheses. All times are in Pacific time.
