= Will Avery (basketball) =

American basketball player (born 1979)

Duke Blue Devils
- Title: Assistant coach
- League: Atlantic Coast Conference

Personal information
- Born: August 8, 1979 (age 47) Augusta, Georgia, U.S.
- Listed height: 6 ft 2 in (1.88 m)
- Listed weight: 200 lb (91 kg)

Career information
- High school: Oak Hill Academy (Mouth of Wilson, Virginia)
- College: Duke (1997–1999)
- NBA draft: 1999: 1st round, 14th overall pick
- Drafted by: Minnesota Timberwolves
- Playing career: 1999–2011
- Position: Point guard
- Number: 5
- Coaching career: 2023–present

Career history

Playing
- 1999–2002: Minnesota Timberwolves
- 2002–2003: Strasbourg IG
- 2003: Makedonikos
- 2004: Hapoel Tel Aviv
- 2004–2005: Hapoel Jerusalem
- 2005: Azovmash Mariupol
- 2005–2006: Panionios
- 2006–2007: Alba Berlin
- 2007: Galatasaray Café Crown
- 2007–2008: AEK Athens
- 2008–2009: Trikala 2000
- 2009: PAOK
- 2011: Energa Czarni Slupsk

Coaching
- 2023–present: Duke (assistant)

Career highlights
- Second-team All-ACC (1999); Third-team Parade All-American (1997)
- Stats at NBA.com
- Stats at Basketball Reference

William Franklin Avery Jr. (born August 8, 1979) is an American assistant basketball coach for the Duke Blue Devils and former professional basketball player.

== College career ==
Avery, at 6 ft 2 in (1.90 m), was the starting point guard on the 1998–99 Duke Blue Devils men's basketball team, where he averaged 14.9 points and 5.0 assists per game his sophomore year. After winning 32 straight games, Duke lost in the National Championship game to the University of Connecticut. Avery, along with Elton Brand and Corey Maggette, became one of the first players under Mike Krzyzewski to leave Duke before graduating.

== Professional career ==
=== NBA ===
Avery was selected 14th overall by the Minnesota Timberwolves in the 1999 NBA draft after his sophomore year. He averaged 2.7 points per game and 1.4 assists per game in 142 NBA games over three seasons with the Timberwolves.

=== Israel and Europe ===
Avery was not signed by any NBA teams after his 3-year contract with the Timberwolves expired in 2002, so he moved his career overseas. Avery played with the following pro clubs: Hapoel Tel Aviv and Hapoel Jerusalem of the Israeli League, Strasbourg IG of the French League, Azovmash Mariupol of the Ukrainian League, Makedonikos Alfa, Panionios, and AEK Athens of the Greek League, ALBA Berlin of the German League, and Galatasaray Café Crown of the Turkish League.

Avery was released from Galatasaray in October 2007, just three months after signing with the club. He then immediately moved to Greece and signed with AEK Athens. He joined Trikala 2000 in 2008. In the summer of 2009, he moved to PAOK BC. In February 2011 he signed with Energa Czarni Slupsk in Poland.

== Retirement ==
Avery retired from professional basketball in 2012. After retirement, he returned to Evans, Georgia where he started a basketball camp.

In the Fall of 2019, Avery returned to Duke University to complete his degree in African American studies. While earning his degree, Avery assisted the basketball team. Avery graduated in 2023.

== Coaching career ==
On July 7, 2023, Avery became an assistant coach for Duke.
