= 1998–99 Washington State Cougars men's basketball team =

American college basketball season

1998–99 Washington State Cougars men's basketball
- Conference: Pacific-10 Conference
- Record: 10–19 (4–14 Pac-10)
- Head coach: Kevin Eastman (5th season)
- Assistant coaches: Jeff Maher; Warren Riley; Lorenzo Hall
- Home arena: Beasley Coliseum

1998–99 Pacific-10 Conference men's basketball standings
	Conf.				Overall
Team	W		L	PCT	W		L	PCT
No. 7 Stanford	15	–	3	.833	26	–	7	.788
No. 12 Arizona	13	–	5	.722	22	–	7	.759
No. 15 UCLA	12	–	6	.667	22	–	9	.710
Washington	10	–	8	.556	17	–	12	.586
California	8	–	10	.444	22	–	11	.667
Oregon	8	–	10	.444	19	–	13	.594
USC	7	–	11	.389	15	–	13	.536
Oregon State	7	–	11	.389	13	–	14	.481
Arizona State	6	–	12	.333	14	–	16	.467
Washington State	4	–	14	.222	10	–	19	.345
As of July 26, 2011; Rankings from AP Poll

The 1998–99 Washington State Cougars men's basketball team represented Washington State University for the 1998–99 NCAA Division I men's basketball season. Led by fifth-year head coach Kevin Eastman, the Cougars were members of the Pacific-10 Conference and played their home games on campus at Beasley Coliseum in Pullman, Washington.

The Cougars were 10–19 overall in the regular season and 4–14 in conference play, last in the standings. There was no conference tournament this season; last played in 1990, it resumed in 2002.

Shortly after the regular season ended, Eastman voluntarily resigned.
