= Jonathan Bender =

American basketball player (born 1981)

Personal information
- Born: January 30, 1981 (age 45) Picayune, Mississippi, U.S.
- Listed height: 7 ft 0 in (2.13 m)
- Listed weight: 230 lb (104 kg)

Career information
- High school: Picayune Memorial (Picayune, Mississippi)
- NBA draft: 1999: 1st round, 5th overall pick
- Drafted by: Toronto Raptors
- Playing career: 1999–2006, 2009–2010
- Position: Small forward
- Number: 24, 9

Career history
- 1999–2006: Indiana Pacers
- 2009–2010: New York Knicks

Career highlights
- Mr. Basketball USA (1999); Morgan Wootten National Player of the Year (1999); First-team Parade All-American (1999); Fourth-team Parade All-American (1998); McDonald's All-American MVP (1999); Mississippi Mr. Basketball (1999)

Career NBA statistics
- Points: 1,453 (5.5 ppg)
- Rebounds: 582 (2.2 rpg)
- Assists: 170 (0.6 apg)
- Stats at NBA.com
- Stats at Basketball Reference

Jonathan Rene Bender (born January 30, 1981) is an American former professional basketball player who played for the Indiana Pacers and New York Knicks in the National Basketball Association (NBA). A highly touted 6'11" prospect who mostly played shooting guard in high school, Bender's unusual height for his position and potential garnered much attention leading up to the 1999 NBA draft. After playing 78 games for the Pacers in 2001, knee injuries limited him to a combined 76 games over the next four seasons. He played 25 games for the Knicks in 2009 before his retirement.

== Professional career ==
=== Indiana Pacers (1999–2006) ===
Bender was selected with the fifth pick by the Toronto Raptors in the 1999 NBA draft out of Picayune Memorial High School in Picayune, Mississippi despite a verbal commitment to Mississippi State University. The Raptors then traded Bender to the Indiana Pacers for Antonio Davis. Being hyped for his size, athleticism and all around skill, Bender scored 10 points in 13 minutes against Cleveland on December 10, 1999. He became the first high school draftee to score in double figures in his NBA debut. However, Bender had been plagued by injuries ever since he arrived in Indiana.

Playing in 78 games in the 2001–02 season, he signed a four-year, $28.5 million contract extension. However, the next few years were plagued by injuries. He played in only 46 games the following season, then 21 games in the season after that. A persistent sore right knee limited him to just seven games in 2004–05 and two games in 2005–06. He was waived by the Pacers on June 14, 2006. At that point, he had averaged 5.6 points in 237 career regular season games. In 2005, Bender was rated by Sports Illustrated as #11 on the list of the 20 biggest busts in modern NBA draft history.

Highlights of Bender's career as a Pacer included participating in the Slam Dunk competition during 2001's All-Star weekend, where he executed a Julius Erving-style tomahawk jam from the free throw line, left-handed. In the Pacers' 2004 playoff series with the Celtics, Bender led the Pacers in scoring in game 3, and set personal playoff career bests in rebounds and minutes in game 2. That post season overall, Bender posted a career high 12.5 minutes played per game over 16 games. Despite a lack of personal statistical success given his initial expectations, the Pacers made the postseason every year of Bender's tenure.

=== New York Knicks (2009–2010) ===
On December 13, 2009, the New York Knicks signed Bender to a minimum contract. "Jonathan has worked extremely hard in preparing himself for a return to the NBA," said Donnie Walsh, Knicks President of Basketball Operations. In 25 appearances, Bender averaged 4.7 points in 11.7 minutes per game. But especially notably, Knicks coaches believed he showed great improvement in practice as the season progressed. The Knicks wanted him to return the following season on a one-year deal, but Bender declined saying “it just felt like I’d be going backwards.” Bender then officially retired to focus on his business career.

== Coaching career ==
Bender currently coaches in the greater Houston area with the private coaching service, CoachUp.

== NBA career statistics ==
Legend
GP	Games played	GS	Games started	MPG	Minutes per game
FG%	Field goal percentage	3P%	3-point field goal percentage	FT%	Free throw percentage
RPG	Rebounds per game	APG	Assists per game	SPG	Steals per game
BPG	Blocks per game	PPG	Points per game	**Bold**	Career high

=== Regular season ===
Year	Team	GP	GS	MPG	FG%	3P%	FT%	RPG	APG	SPG	BPG	PPG
1999–00	Indiana	24	1	5.4	.329	.167	.667	.9	.1	.0	.2	2.7
2000–01	Indiana	59	7	9.7	.355	.268	.735	1.3	.5	.1	.5	3.3
2001–02	Indiana	**78**	**17**	**21.1**	.430	.360	.733	**3.1**	.8	**.2**	.6	**7.4**
2002–03	Indiana	46	2	17.8	.441	.358	.714	2.9	.9	**.2**	**1.2**	6.6
2003–04	Indiana	21	0	12.9	.472	**.409**	.830	1.9	.4	**.2**	.5	7.0
2004–05	Indiana	7	0	13.3	.400	.200	.500	2.0	.6	.1	.3	5.1
2005–06	Indiana	2	0	10.5	**.800**	.000	**1.000**	2.0	**1.0**	.0	.5	5.0
2009–10	New York	25	1	11.7	.400	.359	.923	2.1	.6	.1	.7	4.7
Career		262	28	14.7	.417	.340	.763	2.2	.6	.2	.6	5.5

=== Playoffs ===
Year	Team	GP	GS	MPG	FG%	3P%	FT%	RPG	APG	SPG	BPG	PPG
2000	Indiana	9	0	2.3	.667	**1.000**	.500	.3	.0	.1	.0	1.3
2001	Indiana	1	0	4.0	.000	.000	.000	.0	.0	.0	.0	.0
2002	Indiana	5	0	9.2	**.500**	.000	.000	.8	**.4**	**.4**	.6	1.2
2003	Indiana	3	0	11.3	.333	.333	.667	**2.3**	.0	.0	.7	**5.7**
2004	Indiana	**16**	0	**12.6**	.406	.360	**.750**	1.8	**.4**	.1	**.9**	4.8
Career		43	0	7.6	.454	.361	.679	1.0	.2	.1	.4	2.6

== Personal life ==
Bender was known to read while on NBA road trips. He mostly read business books, Andrew Carnegie and J.P. Morgan being two authors he specifically liked.

Bender invented the JB Intensive Trainer, a resistance training device, that strengthened his knees. Sales of the device began in July 2013.

Two years after Hurricane Katrina, Bender founded the nonprofit Jonathan Bender Foundation in New Orleans.

== See also ==
- List of oldest and youngest National Basketball Association players
