= 1999 NBA draft =

Basketball player selection

General information
- Sport: Basketball
- Date: June 30, 1999
- Location: MCI Center (Washington, D.C.)
- Network: TNT

Overview
- 58 total selections in 2 rounds
- League: NBA
- First selection: Elton Brand (Chicago Bulls)
- Hall of Famers: 1: SG Manu Ginóbili

The 1999 NBA draft was held on June 30, 1999, at the MCI Center (now Capital One Arena) in Washington, D.C. It was the first draft in which four players from the same college were picked in the first round, with Elton Brand (1st selection), Trajan Langdon (11th), Corey Maggette (13th) and William Avery (14th) being selected out of Duke University. It is widely viewed as one of the best draft classes, with a total of nine future NBA All-Stars being chosen, as well as three winners of the NBA Sixth Man of the Year Award—Manu Ginóbili, Jason Terry, and Lamar Odom. Six of the top nine picks were NBA All-Stars. Pablo Prigioni, who was eligible for selection but went undrafted, eventually debuted in the 2012–2013 season as the oldest rookie in NBA history at age 35.

Ginóbili was the last active player from this draft class, retiring after the 2017–18 season.

== Draft selections ==
G	Guard	PG	Point guard	SG	Shooting guard	F	Forward	SF	Small forward	PF	Power forward	C	Center

^	Denotes player who has been inducted to the Naismith Memorial Basketball Hall of Fame
*	Denotes player who has been selected for at least one All-Star Game and All-NBA Team
^{+}	Denotes player who has been selected for at least one All-Star Game
^{#}	Denotes player who has never appeared in an NBA regular-season or playoff game
^{~}	Denotes player who has been selected as Rookie of the Year

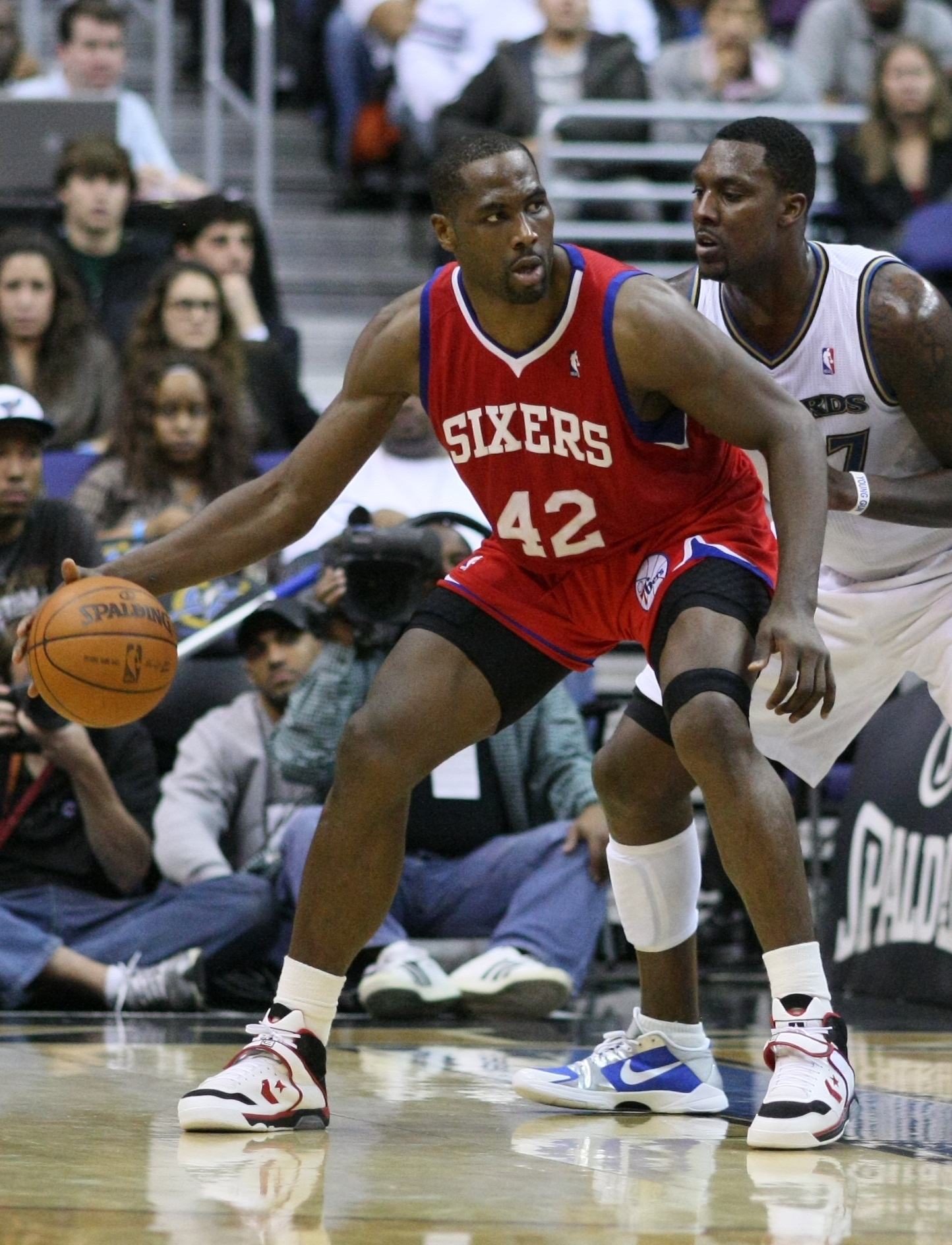
Elton Brand was selected 1st overall by the Chicago Bulls.

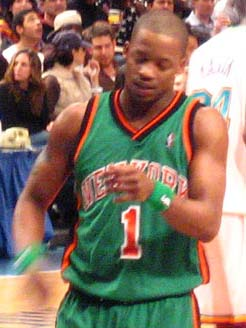
Steve Francis was selected 2nd overall by the Vancouver Grizzlies.

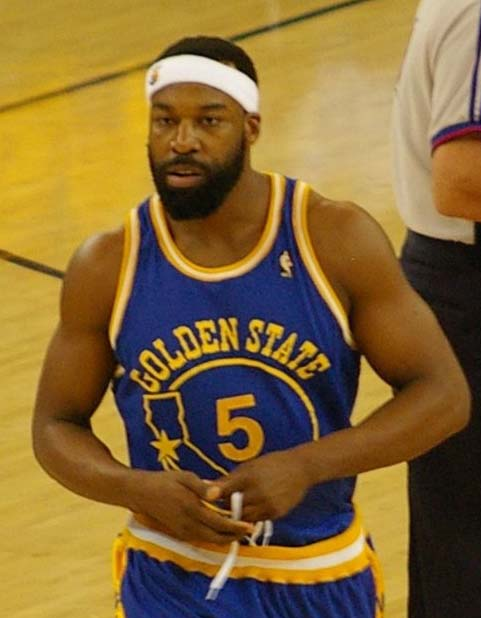
Baron Davis was selected 3rd overall by the Charlotte Hornets.

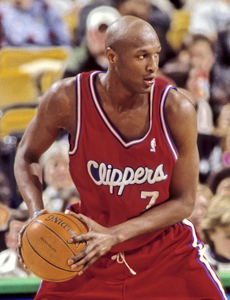
Lamar Odom was selected 4th overall by the Los Angeles Clippers.

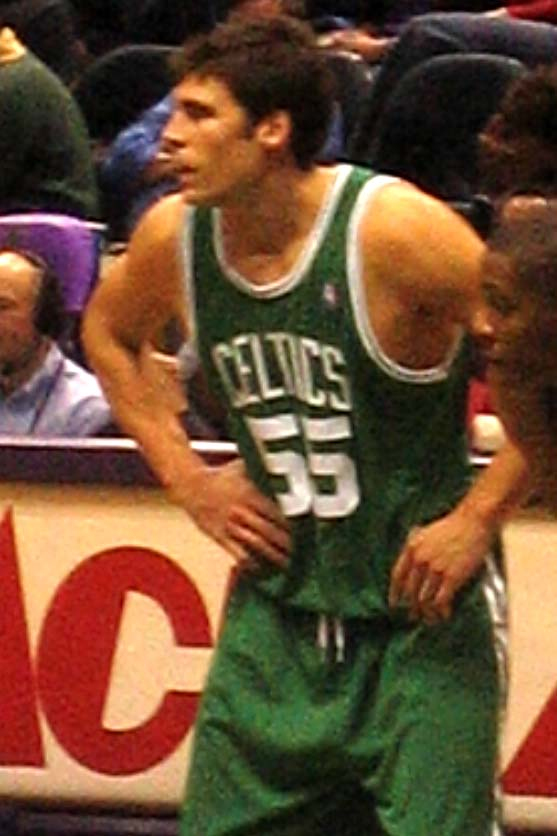
Wally Szczerbiak was selected 6th overall by the Minnesota Timberwolves.

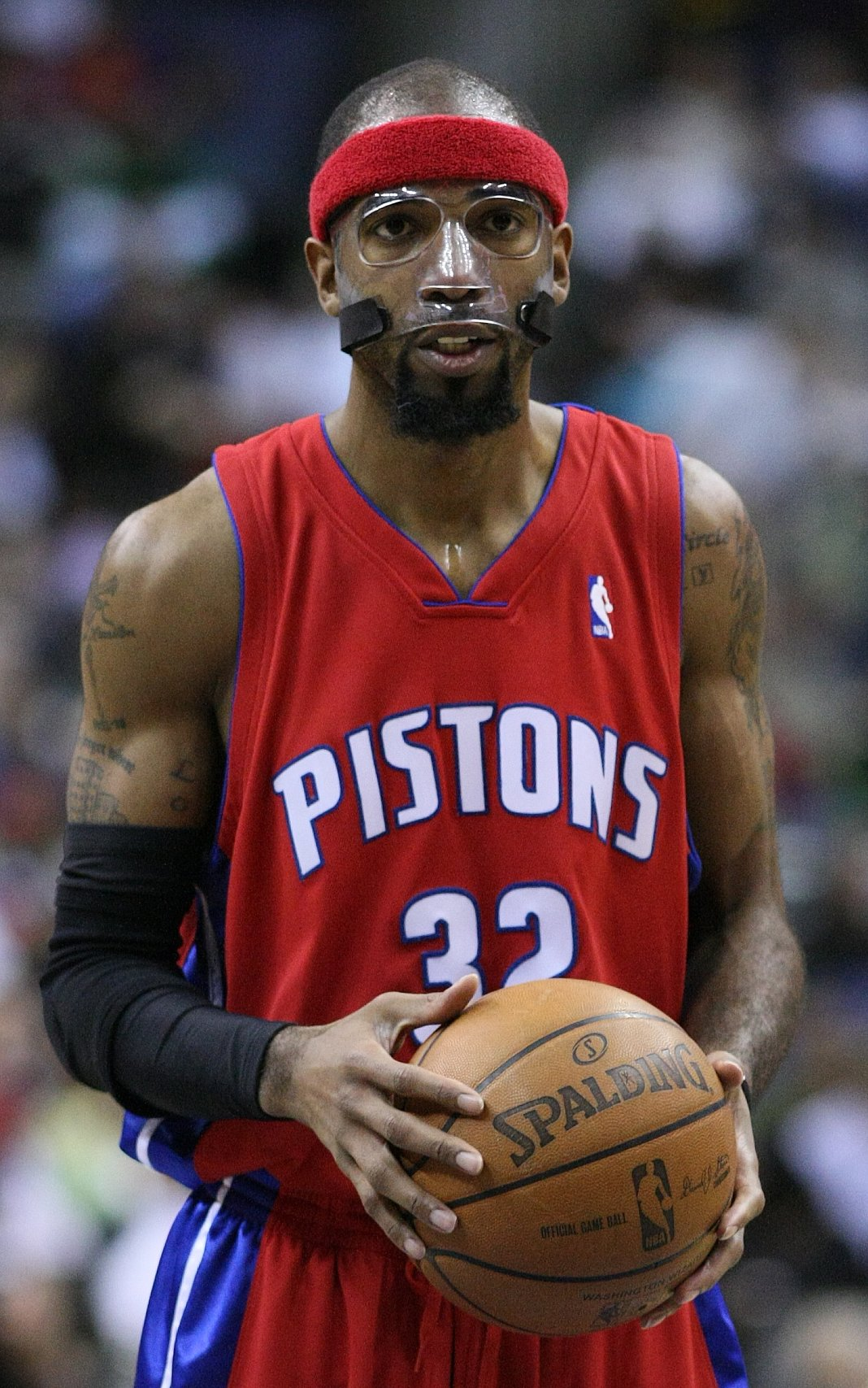
Richard Hamilton was selected 7th overall by the Washington Wizards.

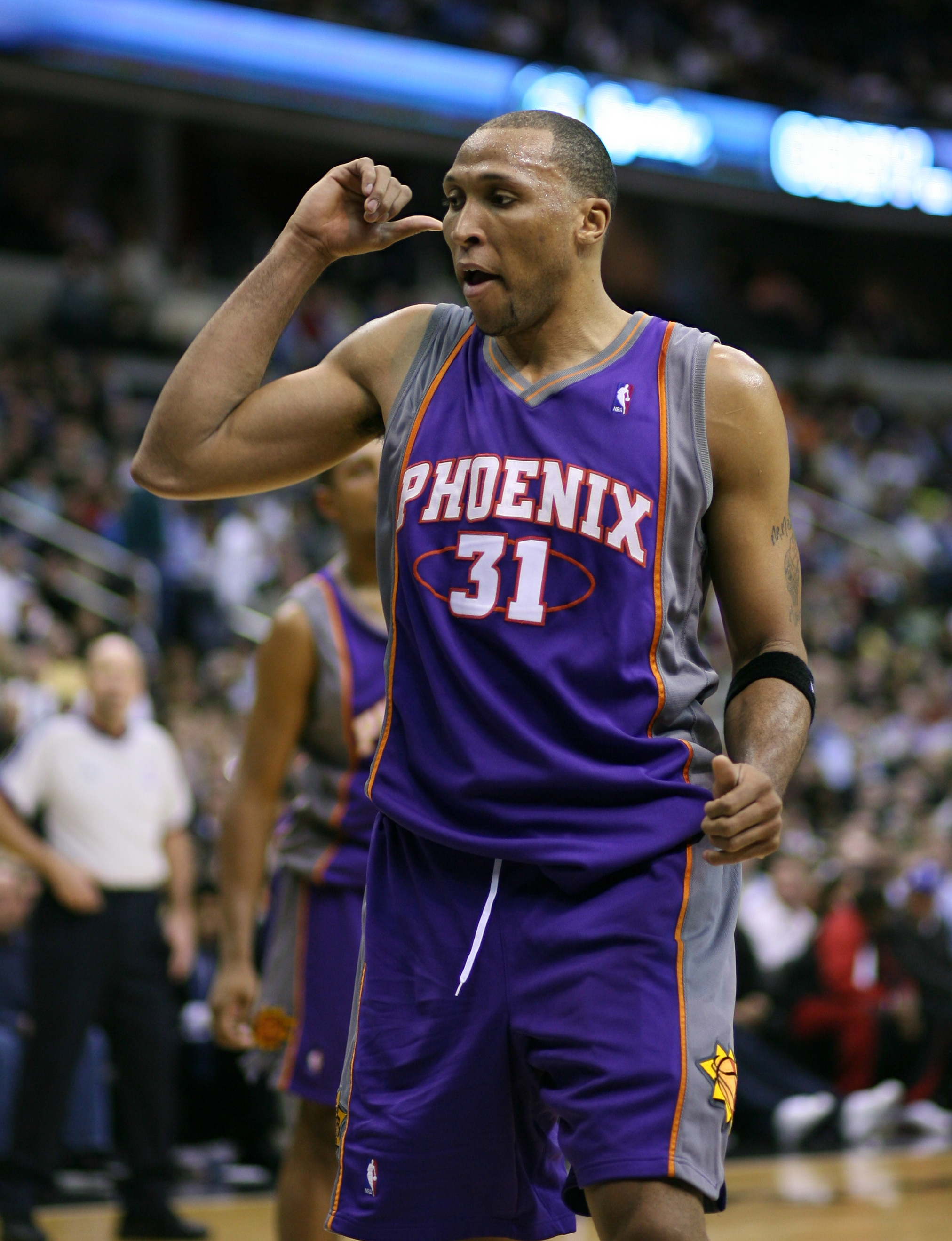
Shawn Marion was selected 9th overall by the Phoenix Suns.

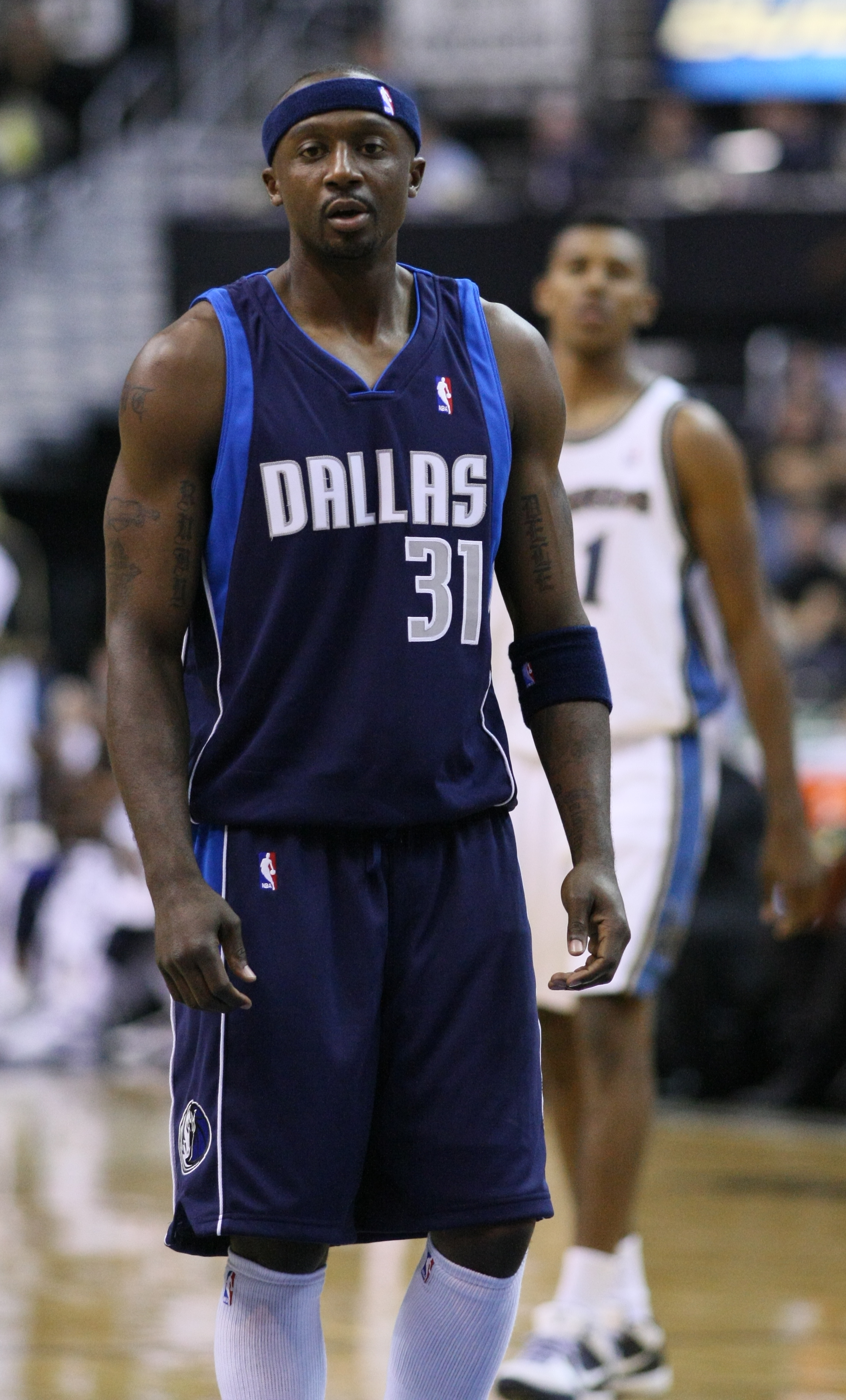
Jason Terry was selected 10th overall by the Atlanta Hawks.

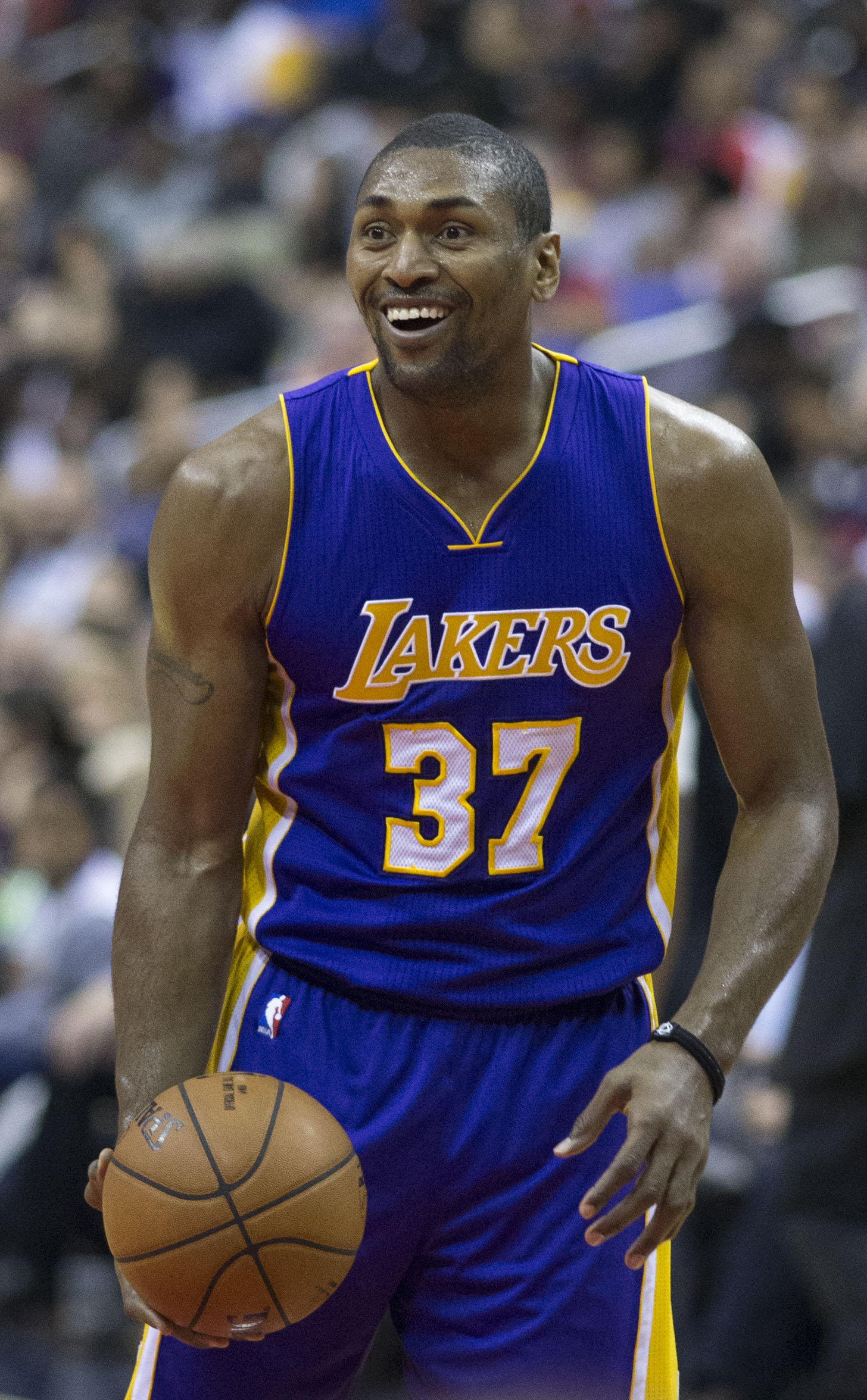
Metta Sandiford-Artest was selected 16th overall by the Chicago Bulls.

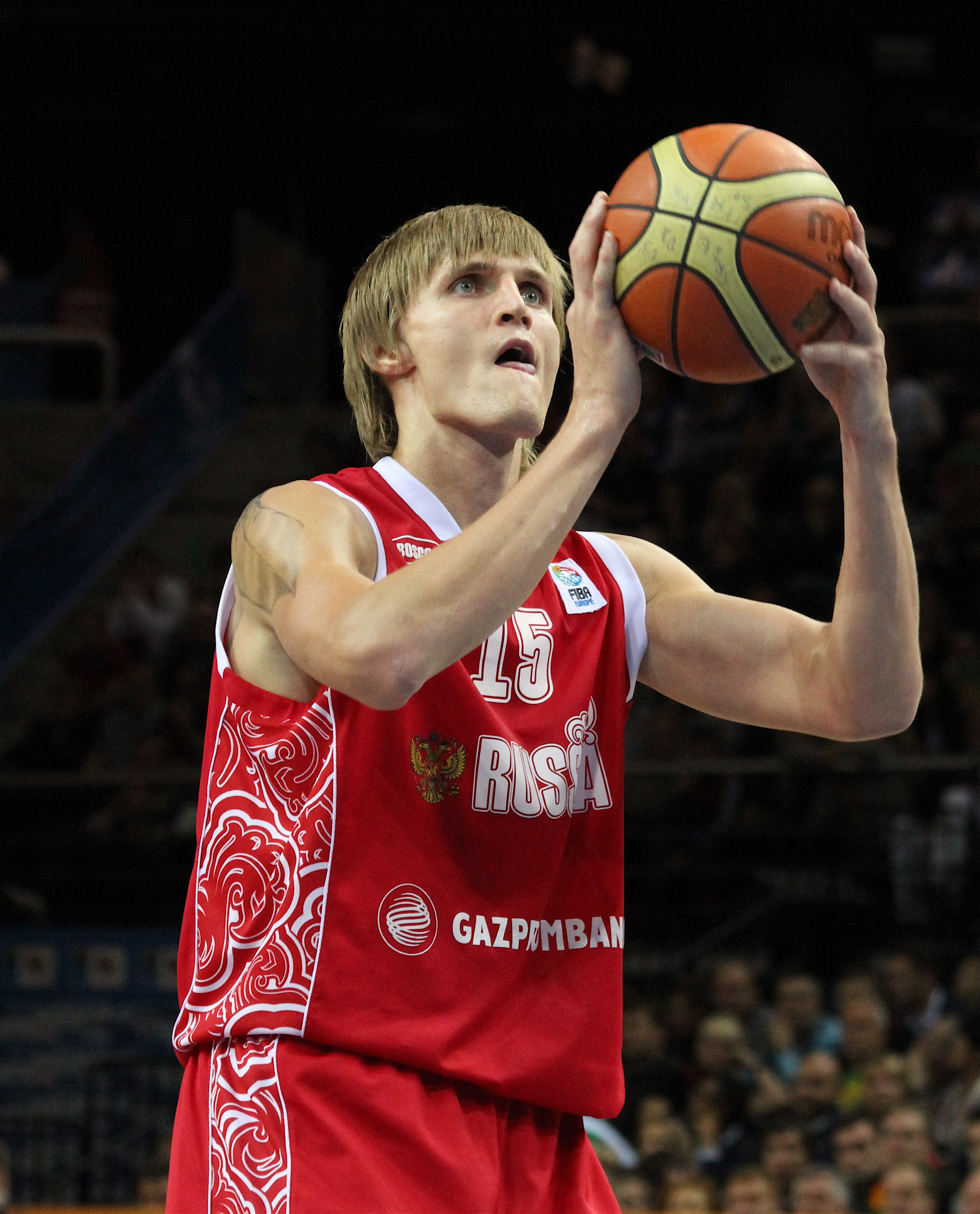
Andrei Kirilenko was selected 24th overall by the Utah Jazz (didn't play in the NBA for the first 2 seasons (1999–2001) after being drafted).

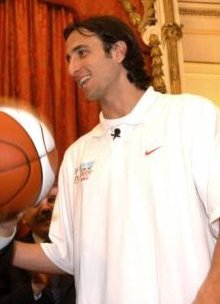
Manu Ginóbili was selected 57th overall by the San Antonio Spurs (didn't play in the NBA for the first 3 seasons (1999–2002) after being drafted).

Round	Pick	Player	Position	Nationality (Note: Nationality indicates the player's national team or representative nationality. If a player has not competed at the international level, then the nationality indicates the national team which the player is eligible to represent according to FIBA rules.)	NBA Team	School/Club team
1	1	Elton Brand*^{~}	PF/C	United States	Chicago Bulls	Duke (So.)
1	2	Steve Francis^{+~}	PG	United States	Vancouver Grizzlies (traded to Houston)	Maryland (Jr.)
1	3	Baron Davis*	PG	United States	Charlotte Hornets	UCLA (So.)
1	4	Lamar Odom	PF/SF	United States	Los Angeles Clippers	Rhode Island (So.)
1	5	Jonathan Bender	PF	United States	Toronto Raptors (from Denver, traded to Indiana)	Picayune Memorial HS (Picayune, Mississippi) (HS Sr.)
1	6	Wally Szczerbiak^{+}	SG/SF	United States	Minnesota Timberwolves (from New Jersey)	Miami (OH) (Sr.)
1	7	Richard Hamilton^{+}	SG/SF	United States	Washington Wizards	Connecticut (Jr.)
1	8	Andre Miller	PG	United States	Cleveland Cavaliers (from Boston)	Utah (Sr.)
1	9	Shawn Marion*	SF/PF	United States	Phoenix Suns (from Dallas)	UNLV (Jr.)
1	10	Jason Terry	SG/PG	United States	Atlanta Hawks (from Golden State)	Arizona (Sr.)
1	11	Trajan Langdon	SG	United States	Cleveland Cavaliers	Duke (Sr.)
1	12	Aleksandar Radojević	C	FR Yugoslavia	Toronto Raptors	Barton County CC (So.)
1	13	Corey Maggette	SF/SG	United States	Seattle SuperSonics (traded to Orlando)	Duke (Fr.)
1	14	Will Avery	PG	United States	Minnesota Timberwolves	Duke (So.)
1	15	Frédéric Weis^{#}	C	France	New York Knicks	Limoges (France)
1	16	Ron Artest* (Note: Ron Artest changed his name to Metta World Peace in 2011 and then Metta Sandiford-Artest in 2020.)	SF	United States	Chicago Bulls (from Phoenix)	St. John's (So.)
1	17	Cal Bowdler	PF	Ireland	Atlanta Hawks (from Sacramento)	Old Dominion (Sr.)
1	18	James Posey	SG/SF	United States	Denver Nuggets (from Milwaukee via Phoenix)	Xavier (Jr.)
1	19	Quincy Lewis	SF	United States	Utah Jazz (from Philadelphia)	Minnesota (Sr.)
1	20	Dion Glover	SG	United States	Atlanta Hawks (from Detroit)	Georgia Tech (So.)
1	21	Jeff Foster	PF	United States	Golden State Warriors (from Atlanta; traded to Indiana)	Southwest Texas State (Sr.)
1	22	Kenny Thomas	PF	United States	Houston Rockets	New Mexico (Sr.)
1	23	Devean George	SF	United States	Los Angeles Lakers	Augsburg (Sr.)
1	24	Andrei Kirilenko^{+}	SF	Russia	Utah Jazz (from Orlando)	CSKA Moscow (Russia)
1	25	Tim James	SF	United States	Miami Heat	Miami (FL) (Sr.)
1	26	Vonteego Cummings	PG	United States	Indiana Pacers (traded to Golden State)	Pittsburgh (Sr.)
1	27	Jumaine Jones	SF	United States	Atlanta Hawks (from Portland via Detroit; traded to Philadelphia)	Georgia (So.)
1	28	Scott Padgett	PF	United States	Utah Jazz	Kentucky (Sr.)
1	29	Leon Smith	PF	United States	San Antonio Spurs (traded to Dallas)	King College Prep HS (Chicago) (HS Sr.)
2	30	John Celestand	PG	United States	Los Angeles Lakers (from Vancouver Grizzlies)	Villanova (Sr.)
2	31	Rico Hill^{#}	F	United States	Los Angeles Clippers	Illinois State (Jr.)
2	32	Michael Ruffin	PF	United States	Chicago Bulls	Tulsa (Sr.)
2	33	Chris Herren	G	United States	Denver Nuggets	Fresno State (Sr.)
2	34	Evan Eschmeyer	C	United States	New Jersey Nets	Northwestern (Sr.)
2	35	Calvin Booth	C	United States	Washington Wizards	Penn State (Sr.)
2	36	Wang Zhizhi	C	China	Dallas Mavericks	Bayi Rockets (China)
2	37	Obinna Ekezie	C	Nigeria	Vancouver Grizzlies (from Boston)	Maryland (Sr.)
2	38	Laron Profit	SG/SF	United States	Orlando Magic (from Golden State)	Maryland (Sr.)
2	39	A. J. Bramlett	C	United States	Cleveland Cavaliers	Arizona (Sr.)
2	40	Gordan Giriček	G/F	Croatia	Dallas Mavericks (traded to San Antonio)	Cibona Zagreb (Croatia)
2	41	Francisco Elson	C	Netherlands	Denver Nuggets	California (Sr.)
2	42	Louis Bullock^{#}	G	United States	Minnesota Timberwolves (traded to Orlando)	Michigan (Sr.)
2	43	Lee Nailon	SF	United States	Charlotte Hornets	TCU (Sr.)
2	44	Tyrone Washington^{#}	C	United States	Houston Rockets (from Phoenix)	Mississippi State (Sr.)
2	45	Ryan Robertson	G	United States	Sacramento Kings	Kansas (Sr.)
2	46	J. R. Koch^{#}	F	United States	New York Knicks	Iowa (Sr.)
2	47	Todd MacCulloch	C	Canada	Philadelphia 76ers	Washington (Sr.)
2	48	Galen Young^{#}	G	United States	Milwaukee Bucks	Charlotte (Sr.)
2	49	Lari Ketner	C	United States	Chicago Bulls (from Detroit via Atlanta)	UMass (Sr.)
2	50	Venson Hamilton^{#}	C	United States	Houston Rockets	Nebraska (Sr.)
2	51	Antwain Smith^{#}	F	United States	Vancouver Grizzlies (from L.A. Lakers)	Saint Paul's (Sr.)
2	52	Roberto Bergersen^{#}	G	United States	Atlanta Hawks	Boise State (Sr.)
2	53	Rodney Buford	SG	United States	Miami Heat	Creighton (Sr.)
2	54	Melvin Levett^{#}	SG	United States	Detroit Pistons (from Indiana)	Cincinnati (Sr.)
2	55	Kris Clack^{#}	G	United States	Boston Celtics (from Orlando via Denver)	Texas (Sr.)
2	56	Tim Young	C	United States	Golden State Warriors (from Portland)	Stanford (Sr.)
2	57	Manu Ginóbili^{^*}	SG	Argentina	San Antonio Spurs	Viola Reggio Calabria (Italy 2nd)
2	58	Eddie Lucas^{#}	G	United States	Utah Jazz	Virginia Tech (Sr.)

== Notable undrafted players ==
These players eligible for the 1999 NBA draft were not selected but have played in the NBA.

Player	Position	Nationality	School/club team
Michael Batiste	PF/C	United States	Long Beach State (Sr.)
Raja Bell	SG	United States Virgin Islands	FIU (Sr.)
Geno Carlisle	PG	United States	California (Sr.)
Maurice Carter	SG	United States	LSU (Sr.)
Jorge Garbajosa	PF	Spain	TAU Cerámica (Spain)
Derek Hood	SF/PF	United States	Arkansas (Sr.)
Jermaine Jackson	SG	United States	Detroit (Sr.)
Harold Jamison	PF	United States	Clemson (Sr.)
Jason Miskiri	PG	Guyana	George Mason (Sr.)
Boniface N'Dong	C	Senegal	SpVgg Rattelsdorf (Germany)
Milt Palacio	SG	Belize	Colorado State (Sr.)
Andy Panko	PF	United States	Lebanon Valley (Sr.)
Pablo Prigioni	PG	Argentina	Obras Sanitarias (Argentina)
Eddie Robinson	SG/SF	United States	Central Oklahoma (Sr.)
Guy Rucker	C	United States	Iowa (Sr.)
Jamel Thomas	SG/SF	United States	Providence (Sr.)
Wayne Turner	PG	United States	Kentucky (Sr.)

== Early entrants ==
=== College underclassmen ===
This year would see a step down in the number of overall underclassmen entering the NBA draft. After seeing 40 initial entries the last two years, this year only saw 39 total initial entries at hand. Not only that, but twelve of the players that had declared entry (with six of the actual collegiate players being Harold Arceneaux from Weber State University, Edwin Daniels from UNLV, DeeAndre Hulett from the College of the Sequoias, Lamont Long from the University of New Mexico, Jamaal Magloire from the University of Kentucky, and Tyron Triplett from Tallahassee Community College) would later withdraw their names from this year's draft, which left only 21 total college underclassmen for this year (27 if you include the two high school players and four international players that stayed in this year's draft). The following college basketball players successfully applied for early draft entrance.

- (United States) Ron Artest – F, St. John's (sophomore)
- (United States) William Avery – G, Duke (sophomore)
- (United States) Carl Boyd – G, California (junior)
- (United States) Elton Brand – F, Duke (sophomore)
- (United States) Baron Davis – G, UCLA (sophomore)
- (United States) Steve Francis – G, Maryland (junior)
- (United States) Dwayne Franklin – F, Shaw (sophomore)
- (United States) Dion Glover – G, Georgia Tech (sophomore)
- (United States) Richard Hamilton – G, Connecticut (junior)
- (United States) Rico Harris – F, Cal State Northridge (junior)
- (United States) Ben Hendricks – G, East Carolina (junior)
- (United States) Kendrick Johnson – G, San Jose State (freshman)
- (United States) Jumaine Jones – F, Georgia (sophomore)
- (United States) Shaun Kenney – G, Cleveland State (sophomore)
- (United States) Corey Maggette – G/F, Duke (freshman)
- (United States) Shawn Marion – F, UNLV (junior)
- (United States) Michael Maxwell – G, Western New Mexico (junior)
- (United States) Greg Minor – G, Cal State Northridge (junior)
- (United States) Lamar Odom – F, Rhode Island (sophomore)
- (Bosnia and Herzegovina) Aleksandar Radojević – C, Barton CC (sophomore)
- (United States) Gene Shipley – F, San Jose CC (freshman)
- (United States) Albert White – G/F, Missouri (junior)

=== High school players ===
This would be the fifth straight year in a row where at least one high school player would declare their entry into the NBA draft directly out of high school after previously only allowing it one time back in 1975. The following high school players successfully applied for early draft entrance.

- (United States) Jonathan Bender – F, Picayune Memorial HS (Picayune, Mississippi)
- (United States) Leon Smith – F, King College Prep (Chicago, Illinois)

=== International players ===
In addition to the players below, the likes of Greece's Georgios Diamantopoulos of the Papagou B.C., Greece's Antonis Fotsis of the Panathinaikos B.C., Brazil's Guilherme Giovannoni of the Esporte Clube Pinheiros, the Nigerian born Olumide Oyedeji of Germany's DJK Würzburg, Yugoslavia's Igor Rakočević of the KK Crvena Zvezda, and Greece's Kostas Tsartsaris of the Near East B.C. also initially declared entry for this year's draft at first, but those six players would later withdraw their names from this year's draft altogether. However, the following international players did successfully apply for early draft entrance.

- (Federal Republic of Yugoslavia) Nikola Dacevic – F, Limoges CSP (France)
- Hrvoje Henjak – C, KK Split (Croatia)
- Andrei Kirilenko – F, PBC CSKA Moscow (Russia)
- Josko Poljak – C, KK Split (Croatia)

== Invited attendees ==
The 1999 NBA draft is considered to be the 21st NBA draft to have utilized what's properly considered the "green room" experience for NBA prospects. The NBA's green room is a staging area where anticipated draftees often sit with their families and representatives, waiting for their names to be called on draft night. Often being positioned either in front of or to the side of the podium (in this case, being positioned somewhere within the MCI Center in Washington, D.C.), once a player heard his name, he would walk to the podium to shake hands and take promotional photos with the NBA commissioner. From there, the players often conducted interviews with various media outlets while backstage. From there, the players often conducted interviews with various media outlets while backstage. However, once the NBA draft started to air nationally on TV starting with the 1980 NBA draft, the green room evolved from players waiting to hear their name called and then shaking hands with these select players who were often called to the hotel to take promotional pictures with the NBA commissioner a day or two after the draft concluded to having players in real-time waiting to hear their names called up and then shaking hands with David Stern, the NBA's commissioner at the time. The NBA compiled its list of green room invites through collective voting by the NBA's team presidents and general managers alike, which in this year's case belonged to only what they believed were the top 16 prospects at the time. Despite the high amount of invites and successful players for this year's draft, there would still be a notable amount of discrepancies between the missed invites of All-Star Andrei Kirilenko and Hall of Famer Manu Ginóbili for actual talents alongside the draft selections Jonathan Bender, Trajan Langdon, Frédéric Weis, and maybe Cal Bowdler missing the perfect draft invite listing, with Ron Artest (to a lesser extent), James Posey, and especially Tim James and Jumaine Jones being late first round draft pick invites there. With that in mind, the following players were invited to attend this year's draft festivities live and in person.

- (United States) Ron Artest – SF, St. John's
- (United States) Will Avery – PG, Duke
- (United States) Elton Brand – PF/C, Duke
- (United States) Baron Davis – PG, UCLA
- (United States) Steve Francis – PG, Maryland
- (United States) Richard Hamilton – SG/SF, Connecticut
- (United States) Jumaine Jones – SF, Georgia
- (United States) Tim James – SF, Miami (FL)
- (United States) Corey Maggette – SG/SF, Duke
- (United States) Shawn Marion – SF/PF, UNLV
- (United States) Andre Miller – PG, Utah
- (United States) Lamar Odom – SF/PF, Rhode Island
- (United States) James Posey – SG/SF, Xavier
- (Federal Republic of Yugoslavia) / (Bosnia and Herzegovina) Aleksandar Radojević – C, Barton County Community College
- (United States) / (Spain) Wally Szczerbiak – SG/SF, Miami (OH)
- (United States) Jason Terry – PG/SG, Arizona

== See also ==
- List of first overall NBA draft picks
