= 1998–99 Big East Conference men's basketball season =

American college basketball season

1998–99 Big East Conference Men's Basketball Season
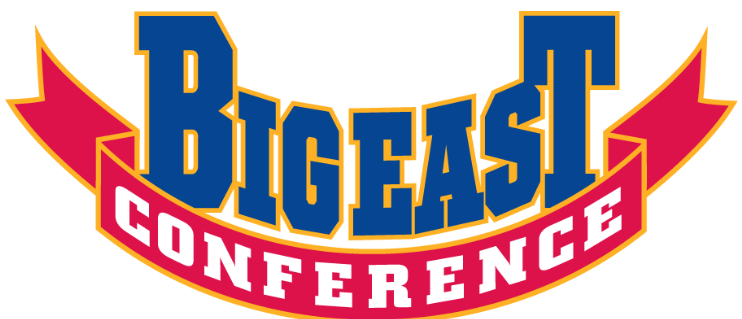
- League: NCAA Division I
- Sport: Basketball
- Duration: November 10, 1998 through March 6, 1999
- Teams: 13
- TV partner: ESPN

Regular Season
- Champion: Connecticut 16–2)
- Season MVP: Richard Hamilton – Connecticut; Tim James – Miami

Tournament
- Champions: Connecticut
- Finals MVP: Kevin Freeman – Connecticut

Basketball seasons
- 1997–98 1999–2000

1998–99 Big East men's basketball standings
	Conf.				Overall
Team	W		L	PCT	W		L	PCT
No. 3 Connecticut†	16	–	2	.889	34	–	2	.944
No. 10 Miami (FL)	15	–	3	.833	23	–	7	.767
No. 9 St. John's	14	–	4	.778	28	–	9	.757
Syracuse	10	–	8	.556	21	–	12	.636
Villanova	10	–	8	.556	21	–	11	.656
Rutgers	9	–	9	.500	19	–	13	.594
Providence	9	–	9	.500	16	–	14	.533
Notre Dame	8	–	10	.444	14	–	16	.467
Seton Hall	8	–	10	.444	15	–	15	.500
Georgetown	6	–	12	.333	15	–	16	.484
Pittsburgh	5	–	13	.278	14	–	16	.467
West Virginia	4	–	14	.222	10	–	19	.345
Boston College	3	–	15	.167	6	–	21	.222
† 1999 Big East tournament winner As of March 29, 1999; Rankings from AP Poll

The 1998–99 Big East Conference men's basketball season was the 20th in conference history, and involved its 13 full-time member schools.

Connecticut was the regular-season champion with a record of 16–2. Connecticut also won the Big East tournament championship.

== Season summary & highlights ==
- After using a two-division structure the three previous seasons, the Big East returned to a unitary structure this season.
- Connecticut was the regular-season champion with a record of 16–2. It was Connecticut's sixth regular-season championship or co-championship and third outright championship.
- Connecticut won its fourth Big East tournament championship.
- Connecticut made the first Final Four appearance in school history.
- Connecticut won its first national championship.
- Connecticut junior guard Richard Hamilton was both the top scorer and the Most Outstanding Player of the 1999 NCAA Tournament.

== Head coaches ==
School	Coach	Season	Notes
Boston College	Al Skinner	2nd	
Connecticut	Jim Calhoun	13th	
Georgetown	John Thompson, Jr.	27th	Resigned and retired January 8, 1999
Georgetown	Craig Esherick	1st	Replaced Thompson January 8, 1999
Miami	Leonard Hamilton	9th	Big East Coach of the Year (2nd award)
Notre Dame	John MacLeod	8th	Resigned March 9, 1999
Pittsburgh	Ralph Willard	5th	Resigned March 3, 1999
Providence	Tim Welsh	1st	
Rutgers	Kevin Bannon	2nd	
St. John's	Mike Jarvis	1st	
Seton Hall	Tommy Amaker	2nd	
Syracuse	Jim Boeheim	23rd	
Villanova	Steve Lappas	7th	
West Virginia	Gale Catlett	21st	

== Rankings ==
Connecticut was ranked No. 1 or No.2 in the Associated Press poll for most of the season, never ranking below No.4 and finishing at No. 3. St. John's and Syracuse were in the Top 25 for most of the season, and Miami and Pittsburgh also spent time in the Top 25.

1998–99 Big East Conference Weekly Rankings Key: ██ Increase in ranking. ██ Decrease in ranking.
AP Poll	Pre	11/16	11/23	11/30	12/7	12/14	12/21	12/28	1/4	1/11	1/18	1/25	2/1	2/8	2/15	2/22	3/1	Final
Boston College																		
Connecticut	2	2	1	1	1	1	1	1	1	1	1	1	1	2	2	4	3	3
Georgetown																		
Miami											25	23	25	16	15	11	9	10
Notre Dame																		
Pittsburgh				20	20	22	24	23										
Providence																		
Rutgers																		
St. John's			23	25	18	15	14	12	10	11	8	9	9	11	10	8	10	9
Seton Hall																		
Syracuse	20	22	19	12	13	21	22	22	20	18	20	17	16	18	21	24		
Villanova																		
West Virginia																		

== Regular-season statistical leaders ==
Scoring
Name	School	PPG
Jamel Thomas	Prov	22.0
Richard Hamilton	Conn	21.5
Troy Murphy	ND	19.2
Tim James	Mia	18.6
Johnny Hemsley	Mia	17.8

Rebounding
Name	School	RPG
Troy Murphy	ND	9.9
Isaac Hawkins	Pitt	8.9
Tyrone Grant	SJU	8.6
Tim James	Mia	8.2
Marcus Goree	WVU	7.9

Assists
Name	School	APG
Vernon Jennings	Mia	5.6
Shaheen Holloway	SHU	5.0
Erick Barkley	SJD	4.7
Kevin Braswell	GU	4.5
Jarett Kearse	WVU	4.4

Steals
Name	School	SPG
John Linehan	Pitt	3.5
Jason Hart	Syr	3.1
Kellii Taylor	Pitt	2.8
Elton Scott	WVU	2.7
Kevin Braswell	GU	2.7

Blocks
Name	School	BPG
Etan Thomas	Syr	4.0
Ruben Boumtje-Boumtje	GU	2.9
Malik Allen	Vill	2.2
Tim James	Mia	2.2
Jameel Watkins	GU	1.9

Field Goals
Name	School	FG%
Troy Murphy	ND	.538
Marcus Goree	WVU	.506
Bootsy Thornton	SJU	.500
Isaac Hawkins	Pitt	.482
Tim James	Mia	.477

3-Pt Field Goals
Name	School	3FG%
(no qualifiers)

Free Throws
Name	School	FT%
Rimas Kaukenas	SHU	.843
Richard Hamilton	Conn	.833
Geoff Billet	RU	.818
Dahntay Jones	RU	.814
John Celestand	Vill	.798

== Postseason ==
=== Big East tournament ===
==== Seeding ====
Seeding in the Big East tournament was based on conference record, with tiebreakers applied as necessary. Teams seeded fourth through thirteenth played a first-round game, and the other three teams received a bye into the second round.

The tournament's seeding was as follows: (1) Connecticut, (2) Miami, (3) St. John's, (4) Syracuse, (5) Villanova, (6) Rutgers, (7) Providence, (8) Notre Dame, (9) Seton Hall, (10) Georgetown, (11) Pittsburgh, (12) West Virginia, (13) Boston College.

==== Bracket ====
First round March 4, 1998
8	Providence	72
9	Notre Dame	55
5	#23 West Virginia	65
12	Rutgers	72
4	Miami	56
13	Georgetown	62
6	Seton Hall	87
11	Boston College	97^{OT}
7	Villanova	96^{2OT}
10	Pittsburgh	93

Quarterfinals; March 5, 1998
1	#6 Connecticut	64
8	Providence	55
12	Rutgers	61
13	Georgetown	60
3	St. John's	91
11	Boston College	80
2	#22 Syracuse	69
7	Villanova	66

Semifinals; March 6, 1998
1	#6 Connecticut	64
12	Rutgers	50
3	St. John's	67
2	#22 Syracuse	69^{OT}

Championship Game; March 7, 1998
1	#6 Connecticut	69
2	#22 Syracuse	64

=== NCAA tournament ===
Five Big East teams received bids to the NCAA Tournament. Syracuse and Villanova lost in the first round, Miami in the second round, and St. John's in the regional finals. Connecticut won the national championship. Connecticut junior guard Richard Hamilton scored 145 points during the tournament and was both its top scorer and Most Outstanding Player.

Ohio State, which defeated St. John's and lost to Connecticut, vacated 34 games, including all NCAA Tournament wins from the 1998–99 season, due to the Jim O’Brien scandal.

School	Region	Seed	Round 1	Round 2	Sweet 16	Elite 8	Final 4	Final
Connecticut	East	1	16 UTSA, W 91–66	9 New Mexico, W 78–56	5 Iowa, W 78–68	10 Gonzaga, W 67–62	S4 ~~Ohio State~~, W 64–58	E1 Duke, W 77–74
St. John's	South	3	14 Samford, W 69–43	6 Indiana, W 86–61	2 Maryland, W 76–62	4 ~~Ohio State~~, L 77–74		
Miami	East	2	15 Lafayette, W 75–54	10 Purdue, L 73–63				
Syracuse	South	8	9 Oklahoma State, L 69–61					
Villanova	Midwest	8	9 Ole Miss, L 72–70					

=== National Invitation Tournament ===
Four Big East teams received bids to the National Invitation Tournament, which did not yet have seeding. They played in two of the tournament's four unnamed brackets. Georgetown, Providence, and Seton Hall all lost in the first round and Rutgers in the second round.

School	Round 1	Round 2
Rutgers	Hofstra, W 58–45	Clemson, L 78–68
Georgetown	Princeton, L 54–47	
Providence	NC State, L 92–86	
Seton Hall	Old Dominion, L 75–56	

== Awards and honors ==
=== Big East Conference ===
Co-Players of the Year:

- Richard Hamilton, Connecticut, G Jr.
- Tim James, Miami, F Sr.

Defensive Player of the Year:

- Etan Thomas, Syracuse, C Jr.

Rookie of the Year:

- Troy Murphy, Notre Dame, F, Fr.

Most Improved Player:

- Johnny Hemsley, Miami, G Jr.

Coach of the Year:

- Leonard Hamilton, Miami (9th season)

All-Big East First Team

- Richard Hamilton, Connecticut, G Jr., 5 ft 11 in (180 cm), 180 lb (82 kg), Coatesville, Pa.
- Johnny Hemsley, Miami, G Jr., 6 ft 5 in (196 cm), 195 lb (88 kg), Baltimore, Md.
- Tim James, Miami, F Sr., 6 ft 7 in (201 cm), 212 lb (96 kg), Miami, Fla.
- Jamel Thomas, Providence, F Sr., 6 ft 6 in (198 cm), 215 lb (98 kg), Brooklyn, N.Y.
- Metta World Peace, St. John's, F, So., 6 ft 6 in (198 cm), 244 lb (111 kg), Queens, N.Y.

All-Big East Second Team:

- Khalid El-Amin, Connecticut, G, So., 5 ft 10 in (178 cm), 200 lb (91 kg), Minneapolis, Minn.
- Troy Murphy, Notre Dame, F, Fr., 6 ft 11 in (211 cm), 245 lb (111 kg), Morristown, N.J.
- Bootsy Thornton, St. John's, G Jr., 6 ft 4 in (193 cm), 195 lb (88 kg), Baltimore, Md.
- Etan Thomas, St. John's, G Jr., 6 ft 10 in (208 cm), 260 lb (118 kg), New York, N.Y.
- Marcus Goree, West Virginia, F Jr., 6 ft 9 in (206 cm), 255 lb (116 kg), Dallas, Tex.

All-Big East Third Team:

- Isaac Hawkins, Pittsburgh, F Jr., 6 ft 8 in (203 cm), 210 lb (95 kg), Baton Rouge, La.
- Vonteego Cummings, Pittsburgh, G Sr., 6 ft 3 in (191 cm), 190 lb (86 kg), Thomson, Ga.
- Rob Hodgson, Rutgers, F Sr., 6 ft 7 in (201 cm), 225 lb (102 kg), Mastic Beach, N.Y.
- Jason Hart, Syracuse, G Jr., 6 ft 3 in (191 cm), 180 lb (82 kg), Los Angeles, Calif.
- John Celestand, Syracuse, G Jr., 6 ft 4 in (193 cm), 178 lb (81 kg), Houston, Tex.

Big East All-Rookie Team:

- Anthony Perry, Georgetown, G, Fr., 6 ft 3 in (191 cm), 186 lb (84 kg), Jersey City, N.J.
- Kevin Braswell, Georgetown, G, Fr., 6 ft 2 in (188 cm), 190 lb (86 kg), Baltimore, Md.
- Troy Murphy, Notre Dame, F, Fr., 6 ft 11 in (211 cm), 245 lb (111 kg), Morristown, N.J.
- Dahntay Jones, Rutgers, F, Fr., 6 ft 6 in (198 cm), 210 lb (95 kg), Trenton, N.J.
- Erick Barkley, St. John's, G, Fr., 6 ft 1 in (185 cm), 177 lb (80 kg), Queens, N.Y.

=== All-Americans ===
The following players were selected to the 1999 Associated Press All-America teams.

Consensus All-America First Team:

- Richard Hamilton, Connecticut, Key Stats: 21.5 ppg, 4.8 rpg, 2.7 apg, 1.2 spg, 44.3 FG%, 34.7 3P%, 732 points

First Team All-America:

- Richard Hamilton, Connecticut, Key Stats: 21.5 ppg, 4.8 rpg, 2.7 apg, 1.2 spg, 44.3 FG%, 34.7 3P%, 732 points

Third Team All-America:

- Tim James, Miami, Key Stats: 18.6 ppg, 8.2 rpg, 1.3 spg, 2.2 bpg, 47.7 FG%, 29.3 3P%, 557 points

AP Honorable Mention

- Khalid El-Amin, Connecticut

== See also ==
- 1998–99 NCAA Division I men's basketball season
- 1998–99 Connecticut Huskies men's basketball team
- 1998–99 Georgetown Hoyas men's basketball team
- 1998–99 Miami Hurricanes men's basketball team
- 1998–99 Notre Dame Fighting Irish men's basketball team
- 1998–99 Pittsburgh Panthers men's basketball team
- 1998–99 St. John's Red Storm men's basketball team
- 1998–99 Syracuse Orangemen basketball team
- 1998–99 Villanova Wildcats men's basketball team
