= 1999 Big East men's basketball tournament =

- Classification: Division I
- Season: 1998–99
- Teams: 13
- Site: Madison Square Garden; New York City
- Champions: Connecticut (4th title)
- Winning coach: Jim Calhoun (4th title)
- MVP: Kevin Freeman (Connecticut)
- Television: ESPN – first round (Syracuse-Boston College; Villanova-West Virginia; Rutgers-Pittsburgh), quarterfinals (Syracuse-Villanova; St. John's-Rutgers), semi-finals, and championship game); ESPN2 – first round (Notre Dame–Seton Hall; Providence–Georgetown) and quarterfinals (Connecticut–Seton Hall; Miami–Georgetown)

1998–99 Big East men's basketball standings
	Conf.				Overall
Team	W		L	PCT	W		L	PCT
No. 3 Connecticut†	16	–	2	.889	34	–	2	.944
No. 10 Miami (FL)	15	–	3	.833	23	–	7	.767
No. 9 St. John's	14	–	4	.778	28	–	9	.757
Syracuse	10	–	8	.556	21	–	12	.636
Villanova	10	–	8	.556	21	–	11	.656
Rutgers	9	–	9	.500	19	–	13	.594
Providence	9	–	9	.500	16	–	14	.533
Notre Dame	8	–	10	.444	14	–	16	.467
Seton Hall	8	–	10	.444	15	–	15	.500
Georgetown	6	–	12	.333	15	–	16	.484
Pittsburgh	5	–	13	.278	14	–	16	.467
West Virginia	4	–	14	.222	10	–	19	.345
Boston College	3	–	15	.167	6	–	21	.222
† 1999 Big East tournament winner As of March 29, 1999; Rankings from AP Poll

The 1999 Big East men's basketball tournament took place at Madison Square Garden in New York City. Its winner received the Big East Conference's automatic bid to the 1999 NCAA tournament. It is a single-elimination tournament with four rounds and the three highest seeds received byes in the first round. All 13 Big East teams were invited to participate. Connecticut finished with the best record in the regular season and was awarded the top seed.

Connecticut defeated St. John's in the final, 82–63 to earn its second consecutive Big East tournament championship, and fourth overall.

== Bracket ==
First round March 3, 1999
8	Notre Dame	69
9	Seton Hall	79
5	Villanova	73
12	West Virginia	61
4	Syracuse	96
13	Boston College	55
6	Rutgers	64
11	Pittsburgh	51
7	Providence	66
10	Georgetown	68

Quarterfinals; March 4, 1999
1	#3 Connecticut	57
9	Seton Hall	56
5	Villanova	62
4	Syracuse	70
3	#10 St. John's	77
6	Rutgers	62
2	#9 Miami	65
10	Georgetown	54

Semifinals; March 5, 1999
1	#3 Connecticut	71
4	Syracuse	50
3	#10 St. John's	62
2	#9 Miami	59

Championship game March 6, 1999
1	#3 Connecticut	82
3	#10 St. John's	63

=== Game summaries ===
==== Quarterfinals ====
espn2

Thursday, March 4
12:00 pm

#1 Connecticut Huskies 57, #9 Seton Hall Pirates 56
Scoring by half: 22–21, 35–35
Pts: Kevin Freeman 22; Rebs: K. El-Amin, R. Hamilton 6 Asts: K. El-Amin 7	Pts: Gary Saunders 18; Rebs: Reggie Garrett 7 Asts: Gary Saunders 6

Madison Square Garden - New York, NY
Attendance: 17,540
Referees: John Cahill, Curtis Shaw, Donnee Gray

==== Semifinals ====
ESPN

Friday, March 5
7:00 pm

#1 Connecticut Huskies 71, #4 Syracuse Orangemen 50
Scoring by half: 38–18, 33–32
Pts: Kevin Freeman 21; Rebs: Rashamel Jones 7 Asts: K. El-Amin 5	Pts: Damone Brown, Jason Hart 12; Rebs: E. Thomas 10; Asts: Damone Brown 5

Madison Square Garden - New York, NY
Attendance: 19,548
Referees: Tim Higgins, Jody Silvester, Ed Corbett

==== Championship game ====
ESPN

Saturday, March 6
8:00 pm

Box Score

#1 Connecticut Huskies 82, #3 St. John's Red Storm 63
Scoring by half: 40–29, 42–34
Pts: R. Hamilton 23; Rebs: R. Hamilton 7 Asts: Ricky Moore 6	Pts: E. Barkley 18; Rebs: R. Artest 7 Asts: E. Barkley 4

Madison Square Garden - New York, NY
Attendance: 19,548
Referees: Jim Burr, John Cahill, Bob Donato

== Media coverage ==
=== Television ===
ESPN and ESPN2

=== Commentary teams ===
- Mike Tirico/Len Elmore – first round (Providence–Georgetown, Rutgers–Pittsburgh), quarterfinals (Miami–Georgetown, St. John's–Rutgers), semifinals, and championship game
- Dan Shulman/Bill Raftery – first round (Notre Dame–Seton Hall, Syracuse–Boston College, Villanova–West Virginia) and quarterfinals (Connecticut–Seton Hall, Syracuse–Villanova)

== Awards ==
Dave Gavitt Trophy (Most Outstanding Player): Kevin Freeman (basketball), Connecticut

All-Tournament Team

- Erick Barkley, St. John's
- Khalid El-Amin, Connecticut
- Kevin Freeman, Connecticut
- Richard Hamilton, Connecticut
- Tim James, Miami
- Etan Thomas, Syracuse
