= 1999 NCAA Division I men's basketball championship game =

American college basketball final

1999 NCAA Tournament Championship Game
National championship game
Connecticut Huskies	Duke Blue Devils
Big East	ACC
(33–2)	(37–1)
77	74
Head coach: Jim Calhoun	Head coach: Mike Krzyzewski
- AP: 3
- Coaches: 3
- AP: 1
- Coaches: 1
	1st half	2nd half	Total
Connecticut Huskies	37	40	77
Duke Blue Devils	39	35	74
- Date: March 29, 1999
- Venue: Tropicana Field, St. Petersburg, Florida
- MVP: Richard Hamilton, Connecticut
- Favorite: Duke by 9.5
- Referees: Tim Higgins, Gerald Boudreaux, Scott Thornley
- Attendance: 41,340

United States TV coverage
- Network: CBS
- Announcers: Jim Nantz (play-by-play); Billy Packer (color); Bonnie Bernstein and Armen Keteyian (sideline)

The 1999 NCAA Division I men's basketball championship game was the finals of the 1999 NCAA Division I men's basketball tournament and it determined the national champion for the 1998-99 NCAA Division I men's basketball season The game was played on March 29, 1999, at Tropicana Field in St. Petersburg, Florida, and featured the East Regional Champion, #1-seeded Duke against the West Regional Champion, #1-seeded Connecticut.

UConn upset the heavily favored Blue Devils 77–74 to win their first national championship in program history, marking the start of a dynasty for the Huskies.

== Participants ==
=== Duke Blue Devils ===
Round	Opponent	Score
First Round	No. 16 Florida A&M	99–58
Second Round	No. 9 Tulsa	97–56
Sweet Sixteen	No. 12 Southwest Missouri St.	78–61
Elite Eight	No. 6 Temple	85–64
Final Four	No. 1 Michigan St.	68–62
Championship	No. 1 Connecticut	74–77

=== Connecticut Huskies ===
Round	Opponent	Score
First Round	No. 16 Texas–San Antonio	91–66
Second Round	No. 9 New Mexico	78–56
Sweet Sixteen	No. 5 Iowa	78–68
Elite Eight	No. 10 Gonzaga	67–62
Final Four	No. 4 Ohio St.	64–58
Championship	No. 1 Duke	77–74

== Starting lineups ==
Duke	Position	Connecticut
Trajan Langdon	G	Ricky Moore
William Avery	G	Khalid El-Amin
Shane Battier	F	Kevin Freeman
Chris Carrawell	F	† Richard Hamilton
† Elton Brand	C	Jake Voskuhl
† 1999 Consensus First Team All-American

== Game summary ==
CBS

March 29
9:00 pm

Box score

#E1 Connecticut Huskies 77, #W1 Duke Blue Devils 74
Scoring by half: 37–39, 40–35
Pts: Richard Hamilton 27; Rebs: Ricky Moore, Kevin Freeman 8 Asts: Khalid El-Amin 4	Pts: Trajan Langdon 25; Rebs: Elton Brand 13; Asts: William Avery 5

Tropicana Field – St. Petersburg, Florida
Attendance: 41,340
Referees: Tim Higgins, Gerald Boudreaux, Scott Thornley

Trajan Langdon committed a traveling violation with 5.4 seconds left with Duke trailing UConn by one, 75–74. Khalid El-Amin was immediately fouled, and he made both free throws to put the Huskies up by three points. The Blue Devils, who were out of timeouts, had a final chance to tie the game and force overtime, but Langdon, one of college basketball's best three-point shooters, was unable to get off a shot in the final seconds when he got triple-teamed and fell to the floor, and UConn escaped with a 77–74 victory, giving the Huskies their first national championship.

== Game notes ==
- In the national championship game, UConn defeated Duke 77–74 to win their first ever national championship, snapping Duke's 32-game winning streak, and scoring the biggest point-spread upset in Championship Game history. Duke nonetheless tied the record for most games won during a single season, with 37, which they co-held until Kentucky's 38-win seasons in 2011–2012 and in 2014–2015 (The 2007-08 Memphis team actually broke this record first, but the team was later forced to vacate their entire season due to eligibility issues surrounding the team).
- The 1999 National Championship game would be the last time Tropicana Field would host NCAA tournament games. For Duke, they had 2 straight promising seasons end on the Tropicana Field floor, with an 86–84 loss to Kentucky in the 1998 South Regional final, and then the 1999 National Championship game.
- UConn was a 9.5 point underdog in this game, and is tied with the 1985 Villanova Wildcats for the biggest point spread underdog to ever win the NCAA Division I Men's Basketball Championship Game.

== Aftermath ==
The victory against Duke marked the start of a dynasty for the Huskies, as they would go on to win the national championship in their next five title game appearances in 2004, 2011, 2014, 2023, and 2024. The winning streak would eventually be ended in 2026, as the Huskies narrowly fell to Michigan by a 69-63 score.

UConn is currently tied with North Carolina for the third most national championships, trailing only Kentucky (8 titles) and UCLA (11 titles).

Despite the loss to UConn, Duke would rebound and win another national championship two years later. They would also win two more national championships in 2010 and 2015.
