= 1998–99 St. John's Red Storm men's basketball team =

American college basketball season

1998–1999 St. John's Red Storm men's basketball

NCAA Men's Division I Tournament, Elite Eight
- Conference: Big East Conference (1979–2013)

Ranking
- Coaches: No. 5
- AP: No. 9
- Record: 28–9 (14–4 Big East)
- Head coach: Mike Jarvis (1st year)
- Assistant coaches: Kevin Clark; Mike Jarvis II; Dermon Player
- Home arena: Alumni Hall; Madison Square Garden

1998–99 Big East men's basketball standings
| | Conf. | | | | Overall |
| Team | W | | L | PCT | W | | L | PCT |
|---|---|---|---|---|---|---|---|---|
| No. 3 Connecticut† | 16 | – | 2 | .889 | 34 | – | 2 | .944 |
| No. 10 Miami (FL) | 15 | – | 3 | .833 | 23 | – | 7 | .767 |
| No. 9 St. John's | 14 | – | 4 | .778 | 28 | – | 9 | .757 |
| Syracuse | 10 | – | 8 | .556 | 21 | – | 12 | .636 |
| Villanova | 10 | – | 8 | .556 | 21 | – | 11 | .656 |
| Rutgers | 9 | – | 9 | .500 | 19 | – | 13 | .594 |
| Providence | 9 | – | 9 | .500 | 16 | – | 14 | .533 |
| Notre Dame | 8 | – | 10 | .444 | 14 | – | 16 | .467 |
| Seton Hall | 8 | – | 10 | .444 | 15 | – | 15 | .500 |
| Georgetown | 6 | – | 12 | .333 | 15 | – | 16 | .484 |
| Pittsburgh | 5 | – | 13 | .278 | 14 | – | 16 | .467 |
| West Virginia | 4 | – | 14 | .222 | 10 | – | 19 | .345 |
| Boston College | 3 | – | 15 | .167 | 6 | – | 21 | .222 |
† 1999 Big East tournament winner As of March 29, 1999; Rankings from AP Poll

The 1998–99 St. John's Red Storm men's basketball team represented St. John's University during the 1998–99 NCAA Division I men's basketball season. The team was coached by Mike Jarvis in his first year at the school after replacing head coach Fran Fraschilla. St. John's home games are played at Alumni Hall and Madison Square Garden and the team is a member of the Big East Conference.

== Off season ==
=== Departures ===
| Name | Number | Pos. | Height | Year | Hometown | Notes |
|---|---|---|---|---|---|---|
| Tarik Turner | 4 | G | 6'5" | Senior | Charlottesville, Virginia | Graduated |
| Felipe Lopez | 13 | G | 6'5" | Senior | Santo Domingo, Dominican Republic | Graduated. Entered 1998 NBA draft |
| Milos Dumic | 21 | F/C | 6'9" | Freshman | Bijeljina, Yugoslavia | Transferred |
| Giovanni Soto | 24 | F | 6'7" | Senior | Far Rockaway, New York | Graduated |
| Zendon Hamilton | 31 | C | 6'9" | Senior | Floral Park, New York | Graduated. Entered 1998 NBA draft/undrafted |
| Shannon Crooks | | G | 6'2" | Freshman | Boston, Massachusetts | Transferred. UMass |
| James Felton | | F | 6'9" | Freshman | Bayonne, New Jersey | Transferred. Florida State |

=== Class of 1998 signees ===
College recruiting information
| Name | Hometown | School | Height | Weight | Commit date |
|---|---|---|---|---|---|
| Erick Barkley; PG | Queens, NY | Maine Central Institute | 6 ft 1 in (1.85 m) | N/A | |
| Erick Barkley; PG | Recruit ratings: No ratings found | | | | |
| Bootsy Thornton; SG | Baltimore, MD | Tallahassee Community College | 6 ft 1 in (1.85 m) | N/A | |
| Bootsy Thornton; SG | Recruit ratings: No ratings found | | | | |
| Anthony Glover; SF | Bronx, NY | Rice High School | 6 ft 6 in (1.98 m) | N/A | |
| Anthony Glover; SF | Recruit ratings: No ratings found | | | | |
| Donald Emanuel; PF | Houston, TX | Jesse H. Jones High School | 6 ft 9 in (2.06 m) | N/A | |
| Donald Emanuel; PF | Recruit ratings: No ratings found | | | | |
| Albert Richardson; PF | New Orleans, LA | McCook Junior College | 6 ft 9 in (2.06 m) | N/A | |
| Albert Richardson; PF | Recruit ratings: No ratings found | | | | |
Overall recruit ranking:
Note: In many cases, Scout, Rivals, 247Sports, On3, and ESPN may conflict in their listings of height and weight.; In these cases, the average was taken. ESPN grades are on a 100-point scale.; Sources: "1998 Team Ranking". Rivals.

== Roster ==
1998–99 St. John's Red Storm men's basketball team
Players
Coaches

| Pos. | # | Name | Height | Weight | Year | Previous school | Hometown |
|---|---|---|---|---|---|---|---|
| G/F | 3 | Chudney Gray | 6 ft 3 in (1.91 m) | — | Jr | Rice | Bronx, NY |
| G | 10 | Kareem Syed (W) | 6 ft 5 in (1.96 m) | — | Jr | Hillcrest | Queens, NY |
| G | 11 | Collin Charles | 5 ft 11 in (1.8 m) | — | Jr | Eastern Commerce | Toronto, Ontario |
| G | 12 | Erick Barkley | 6 ft 1 in (1.85 m) | — | Fr | Christ the King/Maine Central | Queens, NY |
| G | 14 | Bootsy Thornton | 6 ft 1 in (1.85 m) | — | Jr | Tallahassee C.C./Dunbar | Baltimore, MD |
| F | 15 | Ron Artest | 6 ft 6 in (1.98 m) | — | So | La Salle | Queensbridge, NY |
| F | 22 | Anthony Glover (I) | 6 ft 6 in (1.98 m) | — | Fr | Rice | Bronx, NY |
| F | 25 | Lavor Postell | 6 ft 5 in (1.96 m) | — | Jr | Westover | Albany, GA |
| F | 32 | Tyrone Grant | 6 ft 7 in (2.01 m) | — | Sr | Grady | Brooklyn, NY |
| F/C | 33 | Donald Emanuel | 6 ft 9 in (2.06 m) | — | Fr | Jones | Houston, TX |
| G/F | 41 | Reggie Jessie | 6 ft 7 in (2.01 m) | — | So | Bishop Loughlin | Queensbridge, NY |
| F | 55 | Albert Richardson | 6 ft 9 in (2.06 m) | — | Jr | McCook Junior College | New Orleans, LA |

Head coach

- Mike Jarvis (Northeastern)

Assistant coach(es)

- Kevin Clark
- Mike Jarvis II
- Dermon Player

Legend

- (C) Team captain
- (S) Suspended
- (I) Ineligible
- (W) Walk-on
- Injured
- Current redshirt

== Schedule and results ==
| Date time, TV | Rank^{#} | Opponent^{#} | Result | Record | Site city, state |
Regular season
| 11/16/98* | | UNC Asheville; Chase Preseason NIT first round | W 105-50 | 1-0 | Alumni Hall; Queens, NY |
| 11/18/98* | | No. 23 UMass; Chase Preseason NIT Quarterfinal | W 73-69 | 2-0 | Alumni Hall; Queens, NY |
| 11/23/98* | | Columbia | W 71-55 | 3-0 | Alumni Hall; Queens, NY |
| 11/25/98* | No. 23 | vs. No. 3 Stanford; Chase Preseason NIT Semifinal | L 53-55 | 3-1 | Madison Square Garden; New York, NY |
| 11/27/98* | No. 23 | vs. No. 11 Purdue; Chase Preseason NIT Consolation | L 69-70 | 3-2 | Madison Square Garden; New York, NY |
| 11/30/98* | No. 23 | St. Francis (N.Y.) | W 97-63 | 4-2 | Alumni Hall; Queens, NY |
| 12/02/98* | No. 25 | Hofstra | W 70-49 | 5-2 | Alumni Hall; Queens, NY |
| 12/05/98 | No. 25 | at Boston College | W 74-55 | 6-2 (1-0) | Silvio O. Conte Forum; Chestnut Hill, MA |
| 12/09/98 | No. 18 | No. 20 Pittsburgh | W 73-52 | 7-2 (2-0) | Alumni Hall; Queens, NY |
| 12/12/98* | No. 18 | at Virginia | W 95-68 | 8-2 (2-0) | University Hall; Charlottesville, VA |
| 12/19/98* | No. 15 | Fordham | W 88-57 | 9-2 (2-0) | Alumni Hall; Queens, NY |
| 12/22/98* | No. 14 | Fairleigh Dickinson | W 81-54 | 10-2 (2-0) | Alumni Hall; Queens, NY |
| 01/02/99 | No. 12 | at Rutgers | W 77-73 | 11-2 (3-0) | Louis Brown Athletic Center; Piscataway, NJ |
| 01/04/99* | No. 12 | Niagara | W 115-70 | 12-2 (3-0) | Alumni Hall; Queens, NY |
| 01/06/99 | No. 10 | at Miami (F.L.) | L 79-84 | 12-3 (3-1) | Miami Arena; Miami, FL |
| 01/09/99 | No. 10 | Seton Hall | W 86-75 | 13-3 (4-1) | Madison Square Garden; New York, NY |
| 01/11/99 | No. 10 | Georgetown | W 71-69 | 14-3 (5-1) | Madison Square Garden; New York, NY |
| 01/16/99 | No. 11 | Rutgers | W 88-78 | 15-3 (6-1) | Madison Square Garden; New York, NY |
| 01/20/99 | No. 8 | at Providence | W 84-57 | 16-3 (7-1) | Providence Civic Center; Providence, RI |
| 01/24/99; CBS | No. 8 | No. 2 Duke | L 88-92 ^{OT} | 16-4 (7-1) | Madison Square Garden; New York, NY |
| 01/27/99 | No. 9 | at No. 17 Syracuse | W 75-70 | 17-4 (8-1) | Carrier Dome; Syracuse, NY |
| 01/30/99; CBS | No. 9 | No. 1 Connecticut | L 74-78 | 17-5 (8-2) | Madison Square Garden; New York, NY |
| 02/03/99 | No. 9 | No. 25 Miami (F.L.) | L 70-73 | 17-6 (8-3) | Madison Square Garden; New York, NY |
| 02/06/99 | No. 9 | at Pittsburgh | W 88-60 | 18-6 (9-3) | Fitzgerald Field House; Pittsburgh, PA |
| 02/09/99 | No. 11 | at West Virginia | W 80-68 | 19-6 (10-3) | WVU Coliseum; Morgantown, WV |
| 02/13/99 | No. 11 | Villanova | W 82-75 | 20-6 (11-3) | Madison Square Garden; New York, NY |
| 02/15/99 | No. 11 | Providence | W 104-70 | 21-6 (12-3) | Alumni Hall; Queens, NY |
| 02/20/99 | No. 10 | at Georgetown | W 74-66 | 22-6 (13-3) | MCI Center; Washington, D.C. |
| 02/24/99 | No. 8 | Notre Dame | W 73-53 | 23-6 (14-3) | Madison Square Garden; New York, NY |
| 02/27/99; CBS | No. 8 | Villanova | L 60-66 | 23–7 (14–4) | The Pavilion; Villanova, PA |
Big East tournament
| 03/04/99 | No. 10 | vs. Rutgers; Big East tournament quarterfinal | W 77-62 | 24–7 | Madison Square Garden; New York, NY |
| 03/05/99 | No. 10 | vs. No. 9 Miami (F.L.); Big East tournament semifinal | W 62-59 | 25–7 | Madison Square Garden; New York, NY |
| 03/06/99; ESPN | No. 10 | vs. No. 3 Connecticut; Big East tournament championship | L 63-82 | 25–8 | Madison Square Garden; New York, NY |
NCAA Tournament
| 03/11/99; CBS | No. 9 | vs. (14) Samford; NCAA first round | W 69-43 | 26–8 | Orlando Arena; Orlando, FL |
| 03/13/99; CBS | No. 9 | vs. No. 19 (6) Indiana; NCAA second round | W 86-61 | 27–8 | Orlando Arena; Orlando, FL |
| 03/18/99; CBS | No. 9 | vs. No. 5 (2) Maryland; NCAA regional semifinal | W 76-62 | 28–8 | Thompson-Boling Arena; Knoxville, TN |
| 03/20/99; CBS | No. 9 | vs. No. 14 (4) Ohio State; NCAA Regional Final | L 74-77 | 28–9 | Thompson-Boling Arena; Knoxville, TN |
*Non-conference game. ^{#}Rankings from AP Poll. (#) Tournament seedings in parentheses.

== Team players drafted into the NBA ==
| Round | Pick | Player | NBA club |
|---|---|---|---|
| 1 | 16 | Ron Artest | Chicago Bulls |
