= 1998–99 Connecticut Huskies men's basketball team =

American college basketball season

1998–99 Connecticut Huskies men's basketball

NCAA tournament National Champions Big East tournament champions Big East regular season champions

National Championship Game, W 77–74 vs. Duke
- Conference: Big East Conference

Ranking
- Coaches: No. 1
- AP: No. 3
- Record: 34–2 (16–2 Big East)
- Head coach: Jim Calhoun (13th season)
- Assistant coaches: Karl Hobbs; Tom Moore; Dave Leitao
- Home arena: Harry A. Gampel Pavilion; Hartford Civic Center

1998–99 Big East men's basketball standings
	Conf.				Overall
Team	W		L	PCT	W		L	PCT
No. 3 Connecticut†	16	–	2	.889	34	–	2	.944
No. 10 Miami (FL)	15	–	3	.833	23	–	7	.767
No. 9 St. John's	14	–	4	.778	28	–	9	.757
Syracuse	10	–	8	.556	21	–	12	.636
Villanova	10	–	8	.556	21	–	11	.656
Rutgers	9	–	9	.500	19	–	13	.594
Providence	9	–	9	.500	16	–	14	.533
Notre Dame	8	–	10	.444	14	–	16	.467
Seton Hall	8	–	10	.444	15	–	15	.500
Georgetown	6	–	12	.333	15	–	16	.484
Pittsburgh	5	–	13	.278	14	–	16	.467
West Virginia	4	–	14	.222	10	–	19	.345
Boston College	3	–	15	.167	6	–	21	.222
† 1999 Big East tournament winner As of March 29, 1999; Rankings from AP Poll

The 1998–1999 Connecticut Huskies men's basketball team represented the University of Connecticut in the 1998–1999 NCAA Division I basketball season. Coached by Jim Calhoun, the Huskies played their home games at the Hartford Civic Center in Hartford, Connecticut, and on campus at the Harry A. Gampel Pavilion in Storrs, Connecticut, and were a member of the Big East Conference. They won their fourth Big East tournament with a victory over St. John's 82–63.

In the 1999 NCAA Tournament the Huskies were invited as a #1 seed. With wins over Texas–San Antonio, New Mexico, Iowa and Gonzaga, UConn finally advanced to the Final Four. On March 29, 1999, they claimed their first national championship by defeating Duke 77–74.

== Roster ==
Listed are the student athletes who were members of the 1998–1999 team.

1998–99 Connecticut Huskies men's basketball team
Players
Coaches

Pos.	#	Name	Height	Weight	Year	Hometown
G	3	Rashamel Jones	6 ft 5 in (1.96 m)	195 lb (88 kg)	Sr	Port Chester, NY
F	15	Kevin Freeman	6 ft 7 in (2.01 m)	190 lb (86 kg)	Jr	Paterson, NJ
G	21	Ricky Moore	6 ft 2 in (1.88 m)	185 lb (84 kg)	Sr	Augusta, GA
F/C	22	Antric Klaiber	6 ft 10 in (2.08 m)	205 lb (93 kg)	Sr	Silver Spring, MD
G	23	Albert Mouring	6 ft 3 in (1.91 m)	190 lb (86 kg)	So	Preston, MD
G	25	Ed Tonella	5 ft 10 in (1.78 m)	170 lb (77 kg)	Jr	Tucson, AZ
G/F	32	Richard Hamilton	6 ft 7 in (2.01 m)	230 lb (104 kg)	Jr	Coatesville, PA
F/C	34	Souleymane Wane	6 ft 11 in (2.11 m)	240 lb (109 kg)	Jr	Dakar, Senegal
G	35	Richard Moore	5 ft 11 in (1.8 m)	180 lb (82 kg)	Jr	Hamden, CT
G	40	E. J. Harrison	6 ft 1 in (1.85 m)	170 lb (77 kg)	Sr	Danbury, CT
PG	42	Khalid El-Amin	5 ft 10 in (1.78 m)	195 lb (88 kg)	Jr	Minneapolis, MN
C	43	Jake Voskuhl	6 ft 11 in (2.11 m)	250 lb (113 kg)	Jr	Houston, TX
F	51	Edmund Saunders	6 ft 8 in (2.03 m)	230 lb (104 kg)	So	Waterbury, CT
F/C		Stanley Ocitti (redshirt)	6 ft 8 in (2.03 m)	225 lb (102 kg)	Fr	Kampala,Uganda

Head coach

Jim Calhoun

Assistant coach(es)

Karl Hobbs
Tom Moore
Dave Leitao

Legend

- (C) Team captain
- (S) Suspended
- (I) Ineligible
- (W) Walk-on
- Injured
- Current redshirt

Roster

== Schedule ==
Date time, TV	Rank^{#}	Opponent^{#}	Result	Record	Site (attendance) city, state
Regular Season
11/15/1998*; WTXX	No. 2	Quinnipiac	W 102–60	1–0	Harry A. Gampel Pavilion (10,027); Storrs, Connecticut
11/19/1998*; ESPN2	No. 2	Richmond	W 77–57	2–0	Harry A. Gampel Pavilion (10,027); Storrs, Connecticut
11/24/1998*; WTXX	No. 2	Hartford	W 95–58	3–0	Hartford Civic Center (16,192); Hartford, Connecticut
11/27/1998*; WTXX	No. 2	Wagner	W 111–46	4–0	Hartford Civic Center (16,024); Hartford, Connecticut
12/1/1998*; ESPN	No. 1	vs. No. 14 Washington; Great Eight Basketball Classic	W 69–48	5–0	United Center (19,124); Chicago
12/5/1998*; CBS	No. 1	No. 9 Michigan State	W 82–68	6–0	Harry A. Gampel Pavilion (10,027); Storrs, Connecticut
12/9/1998*; ESPN	No. 1	at Massachusetts; MassMutual UGame	W 59–54	7–0	William D. Mullins Memorial Center (9,493); Amherst, Massachusetts
12/12/1998; WTXX	No. 1	at No. 18 Pittsburgh	W 70–69	8–0 (1–0)	Fitzgerald Field House (6,798); Pittsburgh
12/23/1998*; WTXX	No. 1	Fairfield	W 102–67	9–0	Hartford Civic Center (16,294); Hartford, Connecticut
12/30/1998; WTXX	No. 1	Villanova	W 100–76	10–0 (2–0)	Hartford Civic Center (16,294); Hartford, Connecticut
1/2/1999; WTXX	No. 1	Georgetown; Rivalry	W 87–64	11–0 (3–0)	Harry A. Gampel Pavilion (10,077); Storrs, Connecticut
1/6/1999; WTXX	No. 1	at Boston College	W 91–78	12–0 (4–0)	Conte Forum (8,606); Boston
1/9/1999; WTXX	No. 1	at West Virginia	W 80–45	13–0 (5–0)	WVU Coliseum (10,118); Morgantown, West Virginia
1/12/1999; WTXX	No. 1	Notre Dame	W 101–70	14–0 (6–0)	Hartford Civic Center (16,294); Hartford, Connecticut
1/16/1999; WTXX	No. 1	Pittsburgh	W 81–58	15–0 (7–0)	Hartford Civic Center (16,294); Hartford, Connecticut
1/20/1999; ESPN	No. 1	at No. 25 Miami	W 70–68	16–0 (8–0)	Miami Arena (15,147); Miami
1/23/1999; WTXX	No. 1	Seton Hall	W 62–47	17–0 (9–0)	Harry A. Gampel Pavilion (10,027); Storrs, Connecticut
1/25/1999; ESPN	No. 1	at Georgetown; Rivalry	W 78–71	18–0 (10–0)	MCI Center (15,964); Washington, D.C.
1/30/1999; CBS	No. 1	at No. 9 St. John's	W 78–74	19–0 (11–0)	Madison Square Garden (19,528); New York City
2/1/1999; ESPN	No. 1	No. 16 Syracuse; Rivalry	L 42–59	19–1 (11–1)	Hartford Civic Center (16,294); Hartford, Connecticut
2/6/1999*; ABC	No. 1	at No. 4 Stanford	W 70–59	20–1	Maples Pavilion (7,391); Stanford, California
2/10/1999; WTXX	No. 2	Boston College	W 66–50	21–1 (12–1)	Hartford Civic Center (16,294); Hartford, Connecticut
2/13/1999; WTXX	No. 2	at Seton Hall	W 53–48	22–1 (13–1)	Continental Airlines Arena (14,851); East Rutherford, New Jersey
2/16/1999; ESPN2	No. 2	Rutgers	W 77–64	23–1 (14–1)	Harry A. Gampel Pavilion (10,027); Storrs, Connecticut
2/20/1999; CBS	No. 2	No. 15 Miami	L 71–73	23–2 (14–2)	Harry A. Gampel Pavilion (10,027); Storrs, Connecticut
2/22/1999; ESPN	No. 2	at Providence	W 72–65	24–2 (15–2)	Providence Civic Center (12,993); Providence, Rhode Island
2/28/1999; CBS	No. 4	at No. 20 Syracuse; Rivalry	W 70–58	25–2 (16–2)	Carrier Dome (30,367); Syracuse, New York
Big East tournament
3/4/1999; ESPN	(1) No. 3	vs. (9) Seton Hall; Quarterfinals	W 57–56	26–2	Madison Square Garden (17,540); New York
3/5/1999; ESPN	(1) No. 3	vs. (4) Syracuse; Semifinals/Rivalry	W 71–50	27–2	Madison Square Garden (19,548); New York
3/6/1999; ESPN	(1) No. 3	vs. (3) No. 10 St. John's; Championship	W 82–63	28–2	Madison Square Garden (19,548); New York
NCAA tournament
3/11/1999*; CBS	(1 W) No. 3	vs. (16 W) UTSA; First Round	W 91–66	29–2	McNichols Sports Arena (16,237); Denver, Colorado
3/13/1999*; CBS	(1 W) No. 3	vs. (9 W) No. 24 New Mexico; Second Round	W 78–56	30–2	McNichols Sports Arena (16,237); Denver, Colorado
3/18/1999*; CBS	(1 W) No. 3	vs. (5 W) No. 20 Iowa; Sweet Sixteen	W 78–68	31–2	America West Arena (17,957); Phoenix, Arizona
3/20/1999*; CBS	(1 W) No. 3	vs. (10 W) Gonzaga; Elite Eight	W 67–62	32–2	America West Arena (18,053); Phoenix, Arizona
3/27/1999*; CBS	(1 W) No. 3	vs. (4 S) No. 14 Ohio State; Final Four	W 64–58	33–2	Tropicana Field (41,340); St. Petersburg, Florida
3/29/1999*; CBS	(1 W) No. 3	vs. (1 E) No. 1 Duke; National Championship	W 77–74	34–2	Tropicana Field (41,340); St. Petersburg, Florida
*Non-conference game. ^{#}Rankings from AP Poll. (#) Tournament seedings in parentheses. All times are in Eastern Time.

Schedule Source:

== Media ==
Local Radio
Flagship station	Play–by–play	Color commentator	Studio host
WTIC–AM 1080	Joe D'Ambrosio	Wayne Norman	

== Awards and honors ==
- Richard Hamilton, NCAA Men's MOP Award

== Team players drafted into the NBA ==
Year	Round	Pick	Player	NBA club
1999	1	7	Richard Hamilton	Washington Wizards
2000	2	33	Jake Voskuhl	Chicago Bulls
2000	2	34	Khalid El-Amin	Chicago Bulls
