= 1998–99 Syracuse Orangemen basketball team =

American college basketball season

1998–99 Syracuse Orangemen men's basketball

Maui Invitational Tournament champion

NCAA tournament, first round
- Conference: Big East Conference
- Record: 21–12 (10–8 Big East)
- Head coach: Jim Boeheim (23rd season)
- Assistant coaches: Bernie Fine (23rd season); Mike Hopkins (4th season)
- Home arena: Carrier Dome

1998–99 Big East men's basketball standings
	Conf.				Overall
Team	W		L	PCT	W		L	PCT
No. 3 Connecticut†	16	–	2	.889	34	–	2	.944
No. 10 Miami (FL)	15	–	3	.833	23	–	7	.767
No. 9 St. John's	14	–	4	.778	28	–	9	.757
Syracuse	10	–	8	.556	21	–	12	.636
Villanova	10	–	8	.556	21	–	11	.656
Rutgers	9	–	9	.500	19	–	13	.594
Providence	9	–	9	.500	16	–	14	.533
Notre Dame	8	–	10	.444	14	–	16	.467
Seton Hall	8	–	10	.444	15	–	15	.500
Georgetown	6	–	12	.333	15	–	16	.484
Pittsburgh	5	–	13	.278	14	–	16	.467
West Virginia	4	–	14	.222	10	–	19	.345
Boston College	3	–	15	.167	6	–	21	.222
† 1999 Big East tournament winner As of March 29, 1999; Rankings from AP Poll

The 1998–99 Syracuse Orangemen basketball team represented Syracuse University as a member of the Big East Conference during the 1998–99 NCAA Division I men's basketball season. The head coach was Jim Boeheim, serving for his 23rd year. The team played its home games at the Carrier Dome in Syracuse, New York. The team finished with a 21–12 (10–8) record, while making it to the NCAA tournament.

The team was led by juniors Ryan Blackwell, Jason Hart, and Etan Thomas.

== Roster ==
1998–99 Syracuse Orange men's basketball team
Players
Coaches

Pos.	#	Name	Height	Weight	Year	Hometown
G	5	Jason Hart	6 ft 3 in (1.91 m)	185 lb (84 kg)	Jr	Westchester, California
F	25	Damone Brown	6 ft 8 in (2.03 m)	200 lb (91 kg)	So	Buffalo, New York
F	32	Ryan Blackwell	6 ft 7 in (2.01 m)	220 lb (100 kg)	Jr	Pittsford, New York
C	33	Etan Thomas	6 ft 9 in (2.06 m)	245 lb (111 kg)	Jr	Tulsa, Oklahoma

Head coach

- Jim Boeheim (Syracuse)

Assistant coach(es)

- Bernie Fine (Syracuse)
- Mike Hopkins (Syracuse)

Legend

- (C) Team captain
- (S) Suspended
- (I) Ineligible
- (W) Walk-on
- Injured
- Current redshirt

Roster

== Schedule and results ==
Date time, TV	Rank^{#}	Opponent^{#}	Result	Record	Site city, state
Regular Season
Nov 17, 1998*	No. 22	Colgate	W 93–40	1–0	Carrier Dome; Syracuse, New York
Nov 19, 1998*	No. 22	Coppin State	W 74–56	2–0	Carrier Dome; Syracuse, New York
Nov 23, 1998*	No. 19	at Chaminade; Maui Invitational Tournament	W 82–44	3–0	Lahaina Civic Center; Lahaina, Hawaii
Nov 24, 1998*	No. 19	vs. Michigan; Maui Invitational Tournament	W 58–46	4–0	Lahaina Civic Center; Lahaina, Hawaii
Nov 25, 1998*	No. 19	vs. No. 17 Indiana; Maui Invitational Tournament	W 76–63	5–0	Lahaina Civic Center; Lahaina, Hawaii
Dec 1, 1998*	No. 12	Quinnipiac	W 93–65	6–0	Carrier Dome; Syracuse, New York
Dec 4, 1998*	No. 12	Ohio	L 55–61	6–1	Carrier Dome; Syracuse, New York
Dec 5, 1998*	No. 12	Santa Clara	W 95–75	7–1	Carrier Dome; Syracuse, New York
Dec 9, 1998	No. 13	at West Virginia	L 59–73	7–2 (0–1)	WVU Coliseum; Morgantown, West Virginia
Dec 12, 1998	No. 13	Seton Hall	L 64–80	7–3 (0–2)	Carrier Dome; Syracuse, New York
Dec 27, 1998*	No. 22	St. Bonaventure	W 71–55	8–3	Carrier Dome; Syracuse, New York
Dec 29, 1998	No. 22	at Notre Dame	W 75–63	9–3 (1–2)	Joyce Center; Notre Dame, Indiana
Jan 2, 1999	No. 22	West Virginia	W 83–67	10–3 (2–2)	Carrier Dome; Syracuse, New York
Jan 5, 1999	No. 20	at Villanova	W 74–52	11–3 (3–2)	Wells Fargo Center; Philadelphia, Pennsylvania
Jan 12, 1999	No. 18	Providence	L 58–67	11–4 (3–3)	Carrier Dome; Syracuse, New York
Jan 16, 1999	No. 18	at Georgetown; Rivalry	W 81–79	12–4 (4–3)	Verizon Center; Washington, D.C.
Jan 18, 1999	No. 20	at Rutgers	L 71–74	12–5 (4–4)	Louis Brown Athletic Center; Piscataway, New Jersey
Jan 21, 1999	No. 20	Boston College	W 90–51	13–5 (5–4)	Carrier Dome; Syracuse, New York
Jan 24, 1999*	No. 20	South Carolina	W 84–37	14–5	Carrier Dome; Syracuse, New York
Jan 27, 1999	No. 17	No. 9 St. John's	L 70–75	14–6 (5–5)	Carrier Dome; Syracuse, New York
Jan 30, 1999	No. 17	at Seton Hall	W 76–62	15–6 (6–5)	Continental Airlines Arena; East Rutherford, New Jersey
Feb 1, 1999	No. 16	at No. 1 Connecticut; Rivalry	W 59–42	16–6 (7–5)	Harry A. Gampel Pavilion; Storrs, Connecticut
Feb 6, 1999	No. 16	Villanova	L 60–75	16–7 (7–6)	Carrier Dome; Syracuse, New York
Feb 8, 1999	No. 18	No. 16 Miami (FL)	L 63–76	16–8 (7–7)	Carrier Dome; Syracuse, New York
Feb 14, 1999	No. 18	at Pittsburgh	W 75–67	17–8 (8–7)	Fitzgerald Field House; Pittsburgh, Pennsylvania
Feb 17, 1999	No. 21	Notre Dame	W 71–65	18–8 (9–7)	Carrier Dome; Syracuse, New York
Feb 21, 1999*	No. 21	at No. 16 UCLA	L 69–93	18–9	Pauley Pavilion; Los Angeles, California
Feb 24, 1999	No. 24	at Boston College	W 73–56	19–9 (10–7)	Silvio O. Conte Forum; Boston, Massachusetts
Feb 28, 1999	No. 24	No. 4 Connecticut; Rivalry	L 58–70	19–10 (10–8)	Carrier Dome; Syracuse, New York
Big East Tournament
Mar 3, 1999*		vs. Boston College; First round	W 96–55	20–10	Madison Square Garden; New York, New York
Mar 4, 1999*		vs. Villanova; Quarterfinals	W 70–62	21–10	Madison Square Garden; New York, New York
Mar 5, 1999*		vs. No. 3 Connecticut; Semifinals	L 50–71	21–11	Madison Square Garden; New York, New York
NCAA Tournament
Mar 11, 1999*	(8 S)	vs. (9 S) Oklahoma State; First Round	L 61–69	21–12	RCA Dome; Indianapolis, Indiana
*Non-conference game. ^{#}Rankings from AP Poll. (#) Tournament seedings in parentheses. S=South.
