= 1998–99 Miami Hurricanes men's basketball team =

American college basketball season

1998–99 Miami Hurricanes men's basketball

Orange Bowl Classic Champion

NCAA tournament, second round
- Conference: Big East

Ranking
- Coaches: No. 12
- AP: No. 10
- Record: 23–7 (15–3 Big East)
- Head coach: Leonard Hamilton (9th season)
- Assistant coaches: Dwight Freeman; Stan Jones; Scott Howard
- Home arena: Miami Arena

1998–99 Big East men's basketball standings
	Conf.				Overall
Team	W		L	PCT	W		L	PCT
No. 3 Connecticut†	16	–	2	.889	34	–	2	.944
No. 10 Miami (FL)	15	–	3	.833	23	–	7	.767
No. 9 St. John's	14	–	4	.778	28	–	9	.757
Syracuse	10	–	8	.556	21	–	12	.636
Villanova	10	–	8	.556	21	–	11	.656
Rutgers	9	–	9	.500	19	–	13	.594
Providence	9	–	9	.500	16	–	14	.533
Notre Dame	8	–	10	.444	14	–	16	.467
Seton Hall	8	–	10	.444	15	–	15	.500
Georgetown	6	–	12	.333	15	–	16	.484
Pittsburgh	5	–	13	.278	14	–	16	.467
West Virginia	4	–	14	.222	10	–	19	.345
Boston College	3	–	15	.167	6	–	21	.222
† 1999 Big East tournament winner As of March 29, 1999; Rankings from AP Poll

The 1998–99 Miami Hurricanes men's basketball team represented the University of Miami during the 1998–99 NCAA Division I men's basketball season. The Hurricanes, led by ninth-year head coach Leonard Hamilton, played their home games at the Miami Arena and were members of the Big East Conference.

They finished the season 23–7, 15–3 in Big East play to finish in second place. They lost in the second round of the 1999 Big East men's basketball tournament to St. John's. They were invited to the 1999 NCAA Division I men's basketball tournament, where they defeated Lafayette in the first round before falling in the second round to Purdue.

== Previous season ==
The Hurricanes finished the 1997–98 season 18–10 overall, 11–7 in Big East play and lost in the first round of the 1998 NCAA Division I men's basketball tournament to UCLA.

== Roster ==
1998–99 Miami Hurricanes men's basketball team
Players
Coaches

Pos.	#	Name	Height	Weight	Year	Hometown
G	3	Mike Byers-Dawson	5 ft 10 in (1.78 m)	205 lb (93 kg)	So	Fort Worth, TX
G/F	4	Michael Simmons	6 ft 0 in (1.83 m)	185 lb (84 kg)	Fr	Los Angeles, CA
F	5	John Salmons	6 ft 7 in (2.01 m)	200 lb (91 kg)	Fr	Philadelphia, PA
F	11	Jerry Schlie	6 ft 6 in (1.98 m)	200 lb (91 kg)	So	Holbrook, NY
G	13	Paulo Coelho	6 ft 2 in (1.88 m)	185 lb (84 kg)	Fr	Figueira da Foz, Portugal
G	14	Todd Manuel	6 ft 2 in (1.88 m)	180 lb (82 kg)	So	New Canaan, CT
F	15	Nick Donovan	7 ft 0 in (2.13 m)	253 lb (115 kg)	Sr	Coventry, England
G/F	30	Vernon Jennings	6 ft 4 in (1.93 m)	203 lb (92 kg)	Jr	College Park, GA
G/F	31	Johnny Hemsley	6 ft 5 in (1.96 m)	195 lb (88 kg)	Jr	Baltimore, MD
F	34	Dwayne Wimbley	6 ft 9 in (2.06 m)	245 lb (111 kg)	So	Fort Lauderdale, FL
F	40	Tim James	6 ft 7 in (2.01 m)	221 lb (100 kg)	Sr	Miami, FL
G/F	34	Kevin Houston	6 ft 4 in (1.93 m)	215 lb (98 kg)	Jr	Brooklyn, NY
F	44	Elton Tyler	6 ft 9 in (2.06 m)	215 lb (98 kg)	So	Dorchester, MA
F	51	Mario Bland	6 ft 6 in (1.98 m)	265 lb (120 kg)	Jr	Jackson, MS

Head coach

- Leonard Hamilton (UT Martin)

Assistant coach(es)

- Dwight Freeman (Western Colorado)
- Stan Jones (Memphis)
- Scott Howard (Iowa State)

Legend

- (C) Team captain
- (S) Suspended
- (I) Ineligible
- (W) Walk-on
- Injured
- Current redshirt

== Schedule ==
Date time, TV	Rank^{#}	Opponent^{#}	Result	Record	High points	High rebounds	High assists	Site (attendance) city, state
Regular season
Nov 13, 1998*; 7:30 pm		at Florida Atlantic	W 97–73	1–0	26 – James	10 – Tied	8 – Hemsley	FAU Arena (4,122); Boca Raton, FL
Nov 23, 1998*; 7:35 pm		at UNC Charlotte	L 59–66	1–1	15 – Bland	15 – James	5 – Jennings	Dale F. Halton Arena (6,834); Charlotte, NC
Nov 27, 1998*; 7:30 pm		Northern Iowa	W 78–69	2–1	18 – James	10 – Bland	2 – Tied	Miami Arena (2,385); Miami, FL
Dec 5, 1998*; 3:50 pm, CBS		at No. 8 Kentucky	L 65–74	2–2	22 – James	10 – Bland	5 – Jennings	Rupp Arena (23,565); Lexington, KY
Dec 8, 1998; 7:30 pm, SportsChannel		Boston College	W 77–64	3–2 (1–0)	19 – Tied	8 – James	4 – Tied	Miami Arena (2,824); Miami, FL
Dec 11, 1998*; 7:30 pm		Central Florida	W 66–56	4–2	18 – Hemsley	10 – Houston	4 – Hemsley	Miami Arena (2,208); Miami, FL
Dec 18, 1998*; 7:00 pm		at Georgia State	W 76–55	5–2	24 – Hemsley	6 – Jennings	6 – Simmons	GSU Sports Arena (2,189); Atlanta, GA
Dec 22, 1998*; 7:30 pm		Memphis	W 80–64	6–2	23 – James	10 – James	4 – Tied	Miami Arena (2,307); Miami, FL
Dec 27, 1998*; 4:35 pm, SportsChannel		Ohio State; Orange Bowl Basketball Classic	W 72–64	7–2	29 – James	11 – James	3 – Tied	National Car Rental Center (11,051); Sunrise, FL
Dec 30, 1998; 12:05 pm, SportsChannel		at Georgetown	W 64–63	8–2 (2–0)	35 – Hemsley	15 – James	7 – Jennings	MCI Center (7,102); Washington, D.C.
Jan 6, 1999; 7:05 pm, SportsChannel		No. 10 St. John's	W 84–79	9–2 (3–0)	22 – James	7 – Salmons	5 – Jennings	Miami Arena (4,382); Miami, FL
Jan 9, 1999; 7:35 pm, SportsChannel		Notre Dame	L 68–71	9–3 (3–1)	17 – James	5 – Hemsley	5 – Jennings	Miami Arena (4,022); Miami, FL
Jan 13, 1999; 8:05 pm, ESPN2		at Rutgers	W 74–62	10–3 (4–1)	22 – Hemsley	10 – James	6 – Jennings	Louis Brown Athletic Center (6,601); Piscataway, NJ
Jan 16, 1999; 4:05 pm, SportsChannel		at West Virginia	W 64–55	11–3 (5–1)	18 – James	10 – James	4 – Tied	WVU Coliseum (9,261); Morgantown, WV
Jan 20, 1999; 7:05 pm, ESPN	No. 25	No. 1 Connecticut	L 68–70 ^{OT}	11–4 (5–2)	21 – Bland	8 – Tied	4 – Tied	Miami Arena (15,147); Miami, FL
Jan 24, 1999; 1:05 pm, SportsChannel	No. 25	at Boston College	W 75–67	12–4 (6–2)	21 – Hemsley	8 – James	4 – Tied	Conte Forum (4,251); Chestnut Hill, MA
Jan 27, 1999; 7:30 pm	No. 23	Seton Hall	W 77–71	13–4 (7–2)	31 – James	10 – James	7 – Jennings	Miami Arena (3,815); Miami, FL
Jan 30, 1999; 4:30 pm, SportsChannel	No. 23	at Pittsburgh	L 54–60	13–5 (7–3)	17 – James	7 – Tied	2 – Tied	Fitzgerald Field House (6,541); Pittsburgh, PA
Feb 3, 1999; 7:00 pm, ESPN	No. 25	at No. 9 St. John's	W 73–70	14–5 (8–3)	29 – Hemsley	10 – James	6 – Jennings	Madison Square Garden (11,472); New York, NY
Feb 6, 1999; 12:00 pm, WPLG	No. 25	Georgetown	W 71–58	15–5 (9–3)	21 – James	12 – James	7 – Jennings	Miami Arena (4,482); Miami, FL
Feb 8, 1999; 7:30 pm, ESPN	No. 16	at No. 18 Syracuse	W 76–63	16–5 (10–3)	21 – Hemsley	9 – James	11 – Jennings	Carrier Dome (18,836); Syracuse, NY
Feb 13, 1999; 4:00 pm, SportsChannel	No. 16	at Providence	W 69–65	17–5 (11–3)	24 – Hemsley	11 – James	8 – Jennings	Providence Civic Center (10,427); Providence, RI
Feb 16, 1999; 7:30 pm, SportsChannel	No. 15	Villanova	W 103–82	18–5 (12–3)	26 – Hemsley	10 – Bland	8 – Jennings	Miami Arena (4,230); Miami, FL
Feb 20, 1999; 1:00 pm, CBS	No. 15	at No. 2 Connecticut	W 73–71	19–5 (13–3)	19 – Hemsley	14 – Bland	5 – Jennings	Harry A. Gampel Pavilion (10,027); Storrs, CT
Feb 23, 1999; 7:30 pm, SportsChannel	No. 11	Pittsburgh	W 85–52	20–5 (14–3)	20 – James	13 – Salmons	12 – Jennings	Miami Arena (8,210); Miami, FL
Feb 27, 1999; 12:00 pm, WPLG	No. 11	Rutgers	W 68–63	21–5 (15–3)	14 – James	12 – Bland	6 – Jennings	Miami Arena (10,497); Miami, FL
Big East tournament
Mar 4, 1999; 7:05 pm, ESPN2	(2) No. 9	vs. (10) Georgetown; Quarterfinals	W 65–54	22–5	19 – Bland	9 – Bland	5 – Jennings	Madison Square Garden (18,813); New York, NY
Mar 5, 1999; 9:30 pm, ESPN	(2) No. 9	vs. (3) No. 10 St. John's; Semifinals	L 59–62	22–6	25 – James	9 – James	8 – Jennings	Madison Square Garden (19,548); New York, NY
NCAA tournament
Mar 12, 1999; 7:40 pm, CBS	(2 E) No. 10	vs. (15) Lafayette; First Round	W 75–54	23–6	31 – Hemsley	7 – Tied	8 – Jennings	FleetCenter (18,908); Boston, MA
Mar 14, 1999; 5:00 pm, CBS	(2 E) No. 10	vs. (10) Purdue; Second Round	L 63–73	23–7	19 – James	11 – Bland	4 – Salmons	FleetCenter (18,913); Boston, MA
*Non-conference game. ^{#}Rankings from AP Poll. (#) Tournament seedings in parentheses. E=East Region. All times are in Eastern Time.
