= 1998 Maui Invitational =

1998 Maui Invitational Tournament
- Season: 1998–99
- Teams: 8
- Finals site: Lahaina Civic Center; Maui, Hawaii
- Champions: Syracuse (2nd title)
- Runner-up: Indiana (2nd title game)
- Semifinalists: Michigan; Utah
- Winning coach: Jim Boeheim (2nd title)
- MVP: Jason Hart (Syracuse)

The 1998 Maui Invitational Tournament was an early-season college basketball tournament that was played, for the 15th time, from November 23 to November 25, 1998. The tournament, which began in 1984, was part of the 1998-99 NCAA Division I men's basketball season. The tournament was played at the Lahaina Civic Center in Maui, Hawaii and was won by the Syracuse Orange. It was the second title for both the program and for its head coach Jim Boeheim.

== Bracket ==
* – Denotes overtime period

5th place game November 25
22 | Clemson | 79
Kansas State | 45
7th place game
Chaminade | 64
Arizona State | 78

Consolation 2nd Round; November 24
Chaminade | 60
22 | Clemson | 72
Arizona State | 80
Kansas State | 84*

First Round; November 23
Chaminade | 44
22 | Syracuse | 82
Michigan | 59
24 | Clemson | 56
9 | Utah | 65
Arizona State | 48
21 | Indiana | 71
Kansas State | 70

Semifinals; November 24
19 | Syracuse | 58
Michigan | 46
18 | Utah | 49
17 | Indiana | 52

Championship; November 25
19 | Syracuse | 76
17 | Indiana | 63
3rd place game
18 | Utah | 71
Michigan | 54
