= 1998–99 Villanova Wildcats men's basketball team =

American college basketball season

1998–99 Villanova Wildcats men's basketball

NCAA tournament, Round of 64
- Conference: Big East Conference
- Record: 21–11 (10–8 Big East)
- Head coach: Steve Lappas (7th season)
- Home arena: First Union Center (Capacity: 6,500)

1998–99 Big East men's basketball standings
	Conf.				Overall
Team	W		L	PCT	W		L	PCT
No. 3 Connecticut†	16	–	2	.889	34	–	2	.944
No. 10 Miami (FL)	15	–	3	.833	23	–	7	.767
No. 9 St. John's	14	–	4	.778	28	–	9	.757
Syracuse	10	–	8	.556	21	–	12	.636
Villanova	10	–	8	.556	21	–	11	.656
Rutgers	9	–	9	.500	19	–	13	.594
Providence	9	–	9	.500	16	–	14	.533
Notre Dame	8	–	10	.444	14	–	16	.467
Seton Hall	8	–	10	.444	15	–	15	.500
Georgetown	6	–	12	.333	15	–	16	.484
Pittsburgh	5	–	13	.278	14	–	16	.467
West Virginia	4	–	14	.222	10	–	19	.345
Boston College	3	–	15	.167	6	–	21	.222
† 1999 Big East tournament winner As of March 29, 1999; Rankings from AP Poll

The 1998–99 Villanova Wildcats men's basketball team represented Villanova University during the 1998–99 season. With an overall record 21–11 and conference record of 10–8, the Wildcats placed fifth in the Big East Conference, and after reaching the finals of the Big East tournament, the team was invited to the NCAA tournament as the No. 8 seed in the Midwest region.

== Roster ==
1998–99 Villanova Wildcats men's basketball team
Players
Coaches

Pos.	#	Name	Height	Weight	Year	Hometown
G	13	John Celestand	6 ft 4 in (1.93 m)	175 lb (79 kg)	Sr	Piscataway, New Jersey
C	15	Malik Allen	6 ft 10 in (2.08 m)	255 lb (116 kg)	Jr	Medford, New Jersey

Head coach

- Steve Lappas

Assistant coach(es)

Legend

- (C) Team captain
- (S) Suspended
- (I) Ineligible
- (W) Walk-on
- Injured
- Current redshirt

Roster

== Schedule and results ==
Date time, TV	Rank^{#}	Opponent^{#}	Result	Record	Site city, state
Regular season
Nov 16, 1998*		George Mason	W 86–76	1–0	First Union Center; Philadelphia, Pennsylvania
Nov 19, 1998*		vs. Nebraska; Top of the World Classic	W 75–60	2–0	Carlson Center; Fairbanks, Alaska
Nov 21, 1998*		at Alaska-Fairbanks; Top of the World Classic	W 66–57	3–0	Carlson Center; Fairbanks, Alaska
Nov 22, 1998*		vs. No. 19 Arkansas; Top of the World Classic	W 76–63	4–0	Carlson Center; Fairbanks, Alaska
Nov 27, 1998*		Mount St. Mary's	W 71–68	5–0	First Union Center; Philadelphia, Pennsylvania
Dec 1, 1998*		Saint Joseph's	W 61–49	6–0	First Union Center; Philadelphia, Pennsylvania
Dec 5, 1998*		at Penn State	L 53–70	6–1	Bryce Jordan Center; University Park, Pennsylvania
Dec 9, 1998		at Seton Hall	L 55–68	6–2 (0–1)	Continental Airlines Arena; East Rutherford, New Jersey
Dec 12, 1998		West Virginia	W 79–75	7–2 (1–1)	First Union Center; Philadelphia, Pennsylvania
Dec 15, 1998*		UMass	W 66–55	8–2	First Union Center; Philadelphia, Pennsylvania
Dec 22, 1998*		Rider	W 86–73	9–2 (1–1)	First Union Center; Philadelphia, Pennsylvania
Dec 27, 1998*		Howard	W 87–49	10–2	First Union Center; Philadelphia, Pennsylvania
Dec 30, 1998; WTXX		at No. 1 Connecticut	L 76–100	10–3 (1–2)	Hartford Civic Center (16,294); Hartford, Connecticut
Jan 5, 1999		No. 20 Syracuse	L 52–74	10–4 (1–3)	First Union Center; Philadelphia, Pennsylvania
Jan 7, 1999		at Notre Dame	W 93–62	11–4 (2–3)	Joyce Center; South Bend, Indiana
Jan 9, 1999		at Rutgers	L 87–97	11–5 (2–4)	Louis Brown Athletic Center; Piscataway, New Jersey
Jan 13, 1999		Boston College	W 76–67	12–5 (3–4)	First Union Center; Philadelphia, Pennsylvania
Jan 16, 1999		Notre Dame	W 85–58	13–5 (4–4)	First Union Center; Philadelphia, Pennsylvania
Jan 19, 1999		Pittsburgh	W 86–65	14–5 (5–4)	First Union Center; Philadelphia, Pennsylvania
Jan 23, 1999		at West Virginia	W 73–62	15–5 (6–4)	WVU Coliseum; Morgantown, West Virginia
Jan 26, 1999		at Providence	L 72–85	15–6 (6–5)	Providence Civic Center; Providence, Rhode Island
Jan 30, 1999		Georgetown	W 93–90 ^{2OT}	16–6 (7–5)	First Union Center (18,743); Philadelphia, Pennsylvania
Feb 3, 1999		Rutgers	W 84–78	17–6 (8–5)	First Union Center; Philadelphia, Pennsylvania
Feb 6, 1999		at No. 16 Syracuse	W 75–60	18–6 (9–5)	Carrier Dome; Syracuse, New York
Feb 13, 1999		at No. 11 St. John's	L 75–82	18–7 (9–6)	Madison Square Garden; New York, New York
Feb 16, 1999; 7:30 p.m., SportsChannel		at No. 15 Miami (FL)	L 82–103	18–8 (9–7)	Miami Arena (4,230); Miami, Florida
Feb 20, 1999		Providence	L 84–90 ^{OT}	18–9 (9–8)	First Union Center; Philadelphia, Pennsylvania
Feb 23, 1999*		Penn	W 74–63	19–9	First Union Center; Philadelphia, Pennsylvania
Feb 27, 1999; CBS		No. 8 St. John's	W 66–60	20–9 (10–8)	First Union Center; Philadelphia, Pennsylvania
Big East tournament
Mar 3, 1999*	(5)	vs. (12) West Virginia; First round	W 73–61	21–9	Madison Square Garden; New York, New York
Mar 4, 1999*	(5)	vs. (4) Syracuse; Quarterfinals	L 62–70	21–10	Madison Square Garden; New York, New York
NCAA tournament
Mar 12, 1999*	(8 MW)	vs. (9 MW) Ole Miss; First round	L 70–72	21–11	Bradley Center; Milwaukee, Wisconsin
*Non-conference game. ^{#}Rankings from AP poll. (#) Tournament seedings in parentheses. MW=Midwest. All times are in Eastern Time.

== Team players in the 1999 NBA draft ==
Round	Pick	Player	NBA club
2	30	John Celestand	Los Angeles Lakers
