= 1998–99 Georgetown Hoyas men's basketball team =

American college basketball season

1998–99 Georgetown Hoyas men's basketball

National Invitation Tournament, First Round
- Conference: Big East Conference
- Record: 15–16 (6–12 Big East)
- Head coach: John Thompson (27th year) (to January 8, 1999); Craig Esherick (1st year) (from January 8, 1999)
- Assistant coaches: Craig Esherick (17th season); Mike Riley (17th season); Ronny Thompson (1st season)
- Captain: Joseph Touomou
- Home arena: MCI Center

1998–99 Big East men's basketball standings
	Conf.				Overall
Team	W		L	PCT	W		L	PCT
No. 3 Connecticut†	16	–	2	.889	34	–	2	.944
No. 10 Miami (FL)	15	–	3	.833	23	–	7	.767
No. 9 St. John's	14	–	4	.778	28	–	9	.757
Syracuse	10	–	8	.556	21	–	12	.636
Villanova	10	–	8	.556	21	–	11	.656
Rutgers	9	–	9	.500	19	–	13	.594
Providence	9	–	9	.500	16	–	14	.533
Notre Dame	8	–	10	.444	14	–	16	.467
Seton Hall	8	–	10	.444	15	–	15	.500
Georgetown	6	–	12	.333	15	–	16	.484
Pittsburgh	5	–	13	.278	14	–	16	.467
West Virginia	4	–	14	.222	10	–	19	.345
Boston College	3	–	15	.167	6	–	21	.222
† 1999 Big East tournament winner As of March 29, 1999; Rankings from AP Poll

The 1998–99 Georgetown Hoyas men's basketball team represented Georgetown University in the 1998–99 NCAA Division I college basketball season. They were coached by John Thompson, in his 27th season as head coach until January 8, 1999, when he resigned and Craig Esherick succeeded him. The Hoyas played most of their home games at the MCI Center in Washington, DC, although they played one home game at McDonough Gymnasium on the Georgetown campus. They were members of the Big East Conference and finished the season 15–16, 6–12 in Big East play. They advanced to the quarterfinals of the 1999 Big East men's basketball tournament before losing to Miami. Not invited to the NCAA Division I men's basketball tournament for the second year in a row, they instead appeared in the 1999 National Invitation Tournament (NIT) – their second consecutive appearance in the NIT – and lost to Princeton in the first round. Georgetown finished with its first losing record since the 1972–73 season.

== Season recap ==
Playing the previous season with a roster depleted by transfers, injuries, and point guard Victor Page's early departure for a professional career, Georgetown in 1997–98 had had its least successful season since 1973–74. The Hoyas began to rebuild their roster this year.

Guard Anthony Perry sat out his freshman year because the National Collegiate Athletic Association (NCAA) had ruled that a computer science class he had taken in high school was insufficient as a core requirement, rendering him academically ineligible for 1997–98. He finally joined the team this season as a sophomore and started all 31 of the team's games, scoring in double figures in 22 of the first 24 games of the year, including 26 points in a game against Syracuse and 24 against Connecticut. He suffered an ankle injury that reduced his performance as the season wore on, and he shot only 20-for-83 (24.1%) from the field to finish the year. Despite his late-season shooting woes, he finished his sophomore year as Georgetown's top scorer for the season, averaging 14.0 points per game.

Freshman guard Kevin Braswell was another newcomer to the team. He started all 31 games – in fact, he would start all 128 games of his collegiate career – and immediately emerged as a prodigious shooter, averaging one shot every 25 seconds and 17.6 points per game during the first five games of the year. During the season as a whole, he scored in double figures 23 times, including four games in which he scored 20 or more points and a season-high 29 points against Georgia State, and he averaged 13.5 points per game for the year. Despite his overall scoring prowess, he played inconsistently; his 441 field goal attempts were second only to Allen Iverson among Georgetown freshman, but he shot only 33 percent from the field in contrast to Iverson's 39 percent. In one of his more notable slumps, he shot only 24.5 percent from the field in three straight losses over a one-week period at the end of 1998 and beginning of 1999, going 7-for-18 (38.9%) against Miami on December 30, 4-for-18 (22.2%) at top-ranked Connecticut on January 2, and 2-for-17 (11.8%) at Seton Hall on January 4.

As a freshman the previous season, guard Nat Burton had been thrust into a starting role as Georgetown's roster ran low on players. Now a sophomore, Burton played in 30 of the team's 31 games and started 28 of them. Although he only shot around 25 percent from beyond the three-point line, he was an aggressive rebounder and inside shooter, and he scored in double figures 12 times in the team's final 14 games. He finished third in scoring on the team, averaging 11.4 points and 4.9 rebounds per game.

After suffering a wrist injury and missing all but the first six games of the previous season, sophomore center Ruben Boumtje-Boumtje returned to action but got off to a slow start, scoring only six field goals in his first four games of the season. He started all 31 games and improved as the season wore on, with five double-doubles, among them a 15-point, 13-rebound performance in a win over Pittsburgh. He finished second in rebounding and fourth in scoring for the team, averaging 8.5 points per game for the year. He blocked 89 shots, the third in history among Georgetown sophomores behind only Patrick Ewing and Alonzo Mourning.

After coaching a last game for Georgetown at Seton Hall on January 4, 1999, head coach John Thompson Jr., abruptly resigned and retired on January 8, 1999, after 26½ seasons at the helm, citing his impending divorce and other family issues and rejecting the idea posed by friends of leaving the team only temporarily for a sabbatical. Assistant coach Craig Esherick, a reserve guard for Georgetown from 1974 to 1978 who had returned as an assistant coach in 1982 and served in that capacity for 17½ seasons, took over, beginning his own five-and-a-half-season run as head coach. Esherick's first game as head coach was against Providence on January 9, 1999.

Twenty-two days after Thompson's resignation, Georgetown made one of the most remarkable comebacks in school history, albeit in a losing cause. On January 30, 1999, the Hoyas faced Villanova at First Union Center in Philadelphia, Pennsylvania, and missed their first ten shots to fall behind the Wildcats 13–0. The Hoyas closed to a 39–30 deficit at halftime, but in the second half Villanova opened with a 16–8 run that left Georgetown trailing 55–38 with 13:55 left to play. With Nat Burton scoring 11 of his game-high 21 points, Georgetown then went on a 19–0 run of its own that gave the Hoyas a 57–55 lead. Eleven ties and fourteen lead changes ensued as three of Georgetown's "big men" fouled out. The game went into overtime, and then into a second overtime. With 14 seconds left in the second overtime and Georgetown leading 90–87, Anthony Perry missed a free throw, and Villanova's Howard Brown scored a 22-foot (6.7-meter) three-point shot to tie the game at 90–90 with 2.6 seconds left. Burton tried to call a time-out, but the officials did not see him, and when Georgetown senior guard-forward Daymond Jackson tried to pass the ball to Perry, Villanova's Brooks Sales intercepted the pass and flipped the ball to Jermaine Medley, who scored a winning 28-foot (8.5-meter) three-pointer at the buzzer to give the Wildcats a 93–90 win.

The team opened the season 6–2 but struggled in conference play, posting a 14–14 record overall, 6–12 in the Big East. Its 10th-place finish in the conference earned it a No. 10 seed in the 1999 Big East tournament. In the first round, the Hoyas upset seventh-seeded Providence, but they fell to second-seeded Miami in the quarterfinals.

With a 15–15 record after the tournament, Georgetown missed the NCAA tournament for the second year in a row, the first time the school had missed the tournament for two consecutive seasons since the 1976–77 and 1977–78 seasons. For the second straight year, the Hoyas accepted an invitation to the National Invitation Tournament (NIT). They lost at Princeton in the first round, bringing their season to the end. The 15–16 record they posted was Georgetown's first losing season since 1972–73.

== Roster ==
#	Name	Height	Weight (lbs.)	Position	Class	Hometown	Previous Team(s)
0	Trez Kilpatrick	6'7"	219	F	So.	Hallandale, FL, U.S.	Hallandale HS; Neosho County Community College (Kansas)
3	Kevin Braswell	6'2"	190	G	Fr.	Baltimore, MD, U.S.	Lake Clifton HS
4	Joseph Touomou	6'2"	195	G	Sr.	Yaounde, Cameroon	Williamston HS (Williamston, NC)
5	Anthony Perry	6'3"	186	G	So.	Jersey City, NJ, U.S.	St. Anthony HS
10	Gharun Hester	6'4"	205	G/F	So.	Fort Washington, MD, U.S.	Friendly HS
11	Daymond Jackson	6'4"	205	G/F	Sr.	Alexandria, VA, U.S.	T. C. Williams HS
12	Dean Berry	5'10"	168	G	Sr.	Brooklyn, NY, U.S.	Episcopal HS
14	Willie Taylor	6'5"	200	G/F	Fr.	La Vergne, TN, U.S.	La Vergne HS
20	Damien Bolden	6'3"	180	G	Jr.	Portland, OR, U.S.	Lincoln HS
25	Nat Burton	6'4"	218	G/F	Jr.	Washington, DC, U.S.	Winchendon Prep (Winchendon, MA)
32	Rhese Gibson	6'8"	230	F	Jr.	New York, NY, U.S.	All Hallows HS
40	Jameel Watkins	6'10"	244	C	Jr.	Brooklyn, NY, U.S.	Paul Robeson HS
44	Ruben Boumtje-Boumtje	7'0"	257	C	So.	Yaounde, Cameroon	Archbishop Carroll HS (Washington, DC)

== Rankings ==
The team was not ranked in the Top 25 in the AP Poll at any time. It also was not ranked in the Top 25 in the final or postseason Coaches' Poll; its Coaches' Poll rankings during the rest of the season are not available.

== 1998–99 Schedule and results ==
Sources

- All times are Eastern

Date time, TV	Rank^{#}	Opponent^{#}	Result	Record	Site (attendance) city, state
Preseason
Sat., Oct. 31, 1998		Fort Hood (U.S. Army All-Star Team)	W 101–68	exhibition	McDonough Gymnasium (2,740); Washington, DC
Regular Season
Tue., Nov. 10, 1998*		vs. No. 7 Temple; Coaches vs. Cancer IKON Classic first round	L 49–65	0–1	Madison Square Garden (13,239); New York, NY
Wed., Nov. 11, 1998*		vs. Illinois; Coaches vs. Cancer IKON Classic Consolation	L 50–64	0–2	Madison Square Garden (13,233); New York, NY
Sun., Nov. 15, 1998*		Hartford	W 91–62	1–2	MCI Center (5,001); Washington, DC
Wed., Nov. 18, 1998*		at Georgia State	W 83–68	2–2	Georgia Dome (10,027); Atlanta, GA
Sat., Nov. 21, 1998*		Grambling State	W 89–61	3–2	MCI Center (5,820); Washington, DC
Tue., Nov. 24, 1998*		IUPU-Indianapolis	W 72–60	4–2	MCI Center (6,071); Washington, DC
Mon., Nov. 30, 1998*		at Bethune-Cookman	W 83–76	5–2	Ocean Center (1,035); Daytona Beach, FL
Wed., Dec. 2, 1998*		Morgan State	W 67–49	6–2	MCI Center (6,003); Washington, DC
Tue., Dec. 8, 1998		Rutgers	L 62–68	6–3 (0–1)	MCI Center (8,307); Washington, DC
Tue., Dec. 22, 1998*		Maryland Eastern Shore	W 94–66	7–3	MCI Center (8,376); Washington, DC
Wed., Dec. 30, 1998		Miami	L 63–64	7–4 (0–2)	MCI Center (7,102); Washington, DC
Sat., Jan. 2, 1999		at No. 1 Connecticut; Rivalry	L 64–87	7–5 (0–3)	Harry A. Gampel Pavilion (10,027); Storrs, CT
Mon., Jan. 4, 1999		at Seton Hall	L 61–72	7–6 (0–4)	Continental Airlines Arena (8,777); East Rutherford, NJ
Sat., Jan. 9, 1999		Providence	W 75–70	8–6 (1–4)	MCI Center (9,502); Washington, DC
Mon., Jan. 11, 1999		at No. 10 St. John's	L 69–71	8–7 (1–5)	Madison Square Garden (9,563); New York, NY
Sat., Jan. 16, 1999; CBS		No. 18 Syracuse; Rivalry	L 79–81	8–8 (1–6)	MCI Center (N/A); Washington, DC
Tue., Jan. 19, 1999		West Virginia	L 54–55	8–9 (1–7)	MCI Center (5,916); Washington, DC
Sat., Jan. 23, 1999		at Pittsburgh	W 79–71	9–9 (2–7)	Civic Arena (6,798); Pittsburgh, PA
Mon., Jan. 25, 1999		No. 1 Connecticut; Rivalry	L 71–78	9–10 (2–8)	MCI Center (15,964); Washington, DC
Sat., Jan. 30, 1999		at Villanova	L 90–93 ^{2OT}	9–11 (2–9)	First Union Center (18,743); Philadelphia, PA
Tue., Feb. 2, 1999		Pittsburgh	W 76–58	10–11 (3–9)	MCI Center (9,902); Washington, DC
Sat., Feb. 6, 1999		at Miami	L 58–71	10–12 (3–10)	Miami Arena (4,482); Miami, FL
Wed., Feb. 10, 1999		at Notre Dame	W 62–53	11–12 (4–10)	Edmund P. Joyce Center (8,305); Notre Dame, IN
Sat., Feb. 13, 1999*		Southern-New Orleans	W 99–73	12–12	McDonough Gymnasium (3,121); Washington, DC
Wed., Feb. 17, 1999		Boston College	W 57–54	13–12 (5–10)	MCI Center (8,399); Washington, DC
Sat., Feb. 20, 1999		No. 10 St. John's	L 66–74	13–13 (5–11)	MCI Center (15,789); Washington, DC
Tue., Feb. 23, 1999		at Rutgers	W 57–53	14–13 (6–11)	Louis Brown Athletic Center (8,507); Piscataway, NJ
Sat., Feb. 27, 1999		at Providence	L 62–64	14–14 (6–12)	Providence Civic Center (9,660); Providence, RI
Big East tournament
Wed., Mar. 3, 1999		vs. Providence; First Round	W 68–66	15–14	Madison Square Garden (15,498); New York, NY
Thu., Mar. 4, 1999		vs. Miami; Quarterfinal	L 54–65	15–15	Madison Square Garden (18,813); New York, NY
National Invitation Tournament
Wed., Mar. 10, 1999		at Princeton; First Round	L 47–54	15–16	Jadwin Gymnasium (3,289); Princeton, NJ
*Non-conference game. ^{#}Rankings from AP Poll. (#) Tournament seedings in parentheses.
