= Leonard Hamilton =

American basketball coach (born 1948)

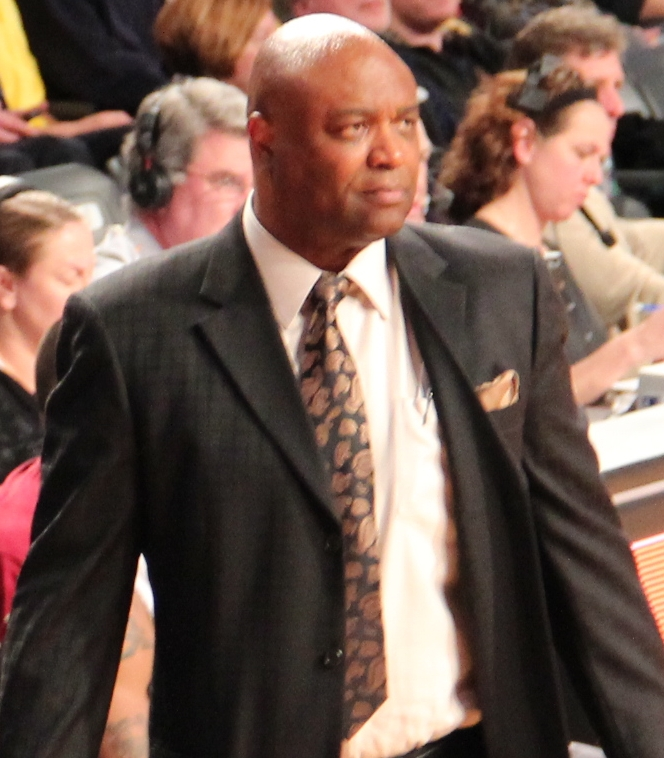
- Hamilton in 2013

Biographical details
- Born: August 4, 1948 (age 78); Gastonia, North Carolina, U.S.

Playing career
- 1966–1968: Gaston CC
- 1969–1971: UT Martin

Coaching career (HC unless noted)
- 1971–1974: Austin Peay (assistant)
- 1974–1986: Kentucky (assistant)
- 1986–1990: Oklahoma State
- 1990–2000: Miami (FL)
- 2000–2001: Washington Wizards
- 2002–2025: Florida State

Head coaching record
- Overall: 660–506 (.566) (college); 19–63 (.232) (NBA)
- Tournaments: 14–11 (NCAA); 10–11 (NIT)

Accomplishments and honors

Championships
- Big East regular season (2000); ACC tournament (2012); ACC regular season (2020)

Awards
- UPI National Coach of the Year (1995); 2× Big East Coach of the Year (1995, 1999); 3× ACC Coach of the Year (2009, 2012, 2020); Ben Jobe Award (2021)

James Leonard Hamilton (born August 4, 1948) is an American former basketball coach. He served as the head coach at Florida State University from 2002 to 2025. He is a former head coach at Oklahoma State University, the University of Miami, and for the National Basketball Association's Washington Wizards.

In his 33 years as a collegiate head coach, his teams qualified for 12 NCAA Division I men's basketball tournaments and 11 National Invitation Tournaments, highlighted by appearances in the NCAA Tournament's Elite Eight (2018) and Sweet 16 (2011, 2019, 2021) with Florida State, and a Sweet 16 appearance with Miami (2000). Other career benchmarks include the Big East Conference regular season championship in 2000, the ACC tournament title in 2012, and the ACC regular season championship in 2020. Hamilton is the winningest coach in school history at Florida State and one of only four coaches to have 200 regular season ACC wins.

== Biography ==
Hamilton played college basketball at the University of Tennessee at Martin, where he was the first Black player in program history. He was a member of the Kappa Alpha Psi fraternity.

Hamilton was an assistant coach and associate head coach at the University of Kentucky from 1974 to 1986 under then-head coach Joe B. Hall. He was the first Black coach in Kentucky basketball history, and is credited with helping Hall to fully integrate the program. Hamilton was on the staff at Kentucky when it finished as the NCAA runner-up in 1975, won the 1978 NCAA Championship and went to the 1984 Final Four. He was a successful recruiter for Kentucky basketball, with players including Jack Givens, James Lee, Sam Bowie and Melvin Turpin

Hamilton was named ACC Coach of the Year on March 10, 2009, and a second time in 2012, and again in 2020. Hamilton is the first coach to be named coach of the year in both the Big East and the ACC. In 2018, he was named the Clarence "Big House" Gaines National Coach of the Year by the National Sports Media Association.

On February 3, 2025, Florida State announced that Hamilton would be resigning as head coach at the conclusion of the 2024–25 season.

== Head coaching record ==
=== College ===
Record table
| Season | Team | Overall | Conference | Standing | Postseason |
|---|---|---|---|---|---|
Oklahoma State Cowboys (Big Eight Conference) (1986–1990)
| 1986–87 | Oklahoma State | 8–20 | 4–10 | 7th | |
| 1987–88 | Oklahoma State | 14–16 | 4–10 | T–6th | |
| 1988–89 | Oklahoma State | 17–13 | 7–7 | T–4th | NIT Second Round |
| 1989–90 | Oklahoma State | 17–14 | 6–8 | 5th | NIT Second Round |
| Oklahoma State: | | 56–63 (.471) | 21–35 (.375) | | |
Miami Hurricanes (NCAA Division I Independent) (1990–1991)
| 1990–91 | Miami | 9–19 | | | |
Miami Hurricanes (Big East Conference) (1991–2000)
| 1991–92 | Miami | 8–24 | 1–17 | 10th | |
| 1992–93 | Miami | 10–17 | 7–11 | 9th | |
| 1993–94 | Miami | 7–20 | 0–18 | 10th | |
| 1994–95 | Miami | 15–13 | 9–9 | 5th | NIT First Round |
| 1995–96 | Miami | 15–13 | 8–10 | 4th (Big East 7) | |
| 1996–97 | Miami | 16–13 | 9–9 | T–4th (Big East 7) | NIT First Round |
| 1997–98 | Miami | 18–10 | 11–7 | 2nd (Big East 7) | NCAA Division I Round of 64 |
| 1998–99 | Miami | 23–7 | 15–3 | 2nd | NCAA Division I Round of 32 |
| 1999–00 | Miami | 23–11 | 13–3 | T–1st | NCAA Division I Sweet 16 |
| Miami: | | 144–147 (.495) | 73–87 (.456) | | |
Florida State Seminoles (Atlantic Coast Conference) (2002–2025)
| 2002–03 | Florida State | 14–15 | 4–12 | 9th | |
| 2003–04 | Florida State | 19–14 | 6–10 | T–7th | NIT Second Round |
| 2004–05 | Florida State | 12–19 | 4–12 | T–10th | |
| 2005–06 | Florida State | 20–10 | 9–7 | 5th | NIT Second Round |
| 2006–07 | Florida State | 22–13 | 7–9 | T–8th | NIT Quarterfinal |
| 2007–08 | Florida State | 19–15 | 7–9 | T–7th | NIT First Round |
| 2008–09 | Florida State | 25–10 | 10–6 | 4th | NCAA Division I Round of 64 |
| 2009–10 | Florida State | 22–10 | 10–6 | T–3rd | NCAA Division I Round of 64 |
| 2010–11 | Florida State | 23–11 | 11–5 | 3rd | NCAA Division I Sweet 16 |
| 2011–12 | Florida State | 25–10 | 12–4 | 3rd | NCAA Division I Round of 32 |
| 2012–13 | Florida State | 18–16 | 9–9 | 6th | NIT First Round |
| 2013–14 | Florida State | 22–14 | 9–9 | T–7th | NIT Semifinal |
| 2014–15 | Florida State | 17–16 | 8–10 | 9th | |
| 2015–16 | Florida State | 20–14 | 8–10 | T–11th | NIT Second Round |
| 2016–17 | Florida State | 26–9 | 12–6 | T–2nd | NCAA Division I Round of 32 |
| 2017–18 | Florida State | 23–12 | 9–9 | T–8th | NCAA Division I Elite Eight |
| 2018–19 | Florida State | 29–8 | 13–5 | 4th | NCAA Division I Sweet 16 |
| 2019–20 | Florida State | 26–5 | 16–4 | 1st | Postseason cancelled due to COVID-19 |
| 2020–21 | Florida State | 18–7 | 11–4 | 2nd | NCAA Division I Sweet 16 |
| 2021–22 | Florida State | 17–14 | 10–10 | 8th | |
| 2022–23 | Florida State | 9–23 | 7–13 | 12th | |
| 2023–24 | Florida State | 17–16 | 10–10 | T–8th | |
| 2024–25 | Florida State | 17–15 | 8–12 | T–9th | |
| Florida State: | | 460–296 (.608) | 211–191 (.525) | | |
| Total: | | 660–506 (.566) | | | |
National champion Postseason invitational champion Conference regular season champion Conference regular season and conference tournament champion Division regular season champion Division regular season and conference tournament champion Conference tournament champion

=== NBA ===
Legend
| Regular season | G | Games coached | W | Games won | L | Games lost | W–L % | Win–loss % |
| Playoffs | PG | Playoff games | PW | Playoff wins | PL | Playoff losses | PW–L % | Playoff win–loss % |

| Team | Year | G | W | L | W–L% | Finish | PG | PW | PL | PW–L% | Result |
|---|---|---|---|---|---|---|---|---|---|---|---|
| Washington | 2000–01 | 82 | 19 | 63 | .232 | 7th in Atlantic | — | — | — | — | Missed Playoffs |
| Career | | 82 | 19 | 63 | .232 | | — | — | — | — | |

== Personal life ==
Hamilton is married to Claudette Hamilton and they have two children.
