= 1998–99 Notre Dame Fighting Irish men's basketball team =

American college basketball season

1998–99 Notre Dame Fighting Irish men's basketball
- Conference: Big East Conference
- Record: 14-16 (8-10 Big East Conference)
- Head coach: John MacLeod (8th season)
- Assistant coach: Billy Taylor (1st season)
- Home arena: Joyce Center

1998–99 Big East men's basketball standings
	Conf.				Overall
Team	W		L	PCT	W		L	PCT
No. 3 Connecticut†	16	–	2	.889	34	–	2	.944
No. 10 Miami (FL)	15	–	3	.833	23	–	7	.767
No. 9 St. John's	14	–	4	.778	28	–	9	.757
Syracuse	10	–	8	.556	21	–	12	.636
Villanova	10	–	8	.556	21	–	11	.656
Rutgers	9	–	9	.500	19	–	13	.594
Providence	9	–	9	.500	16	–	14	.533
Notre Dame	8	–	10	.444	14	–	16	.467
Seton Hall	8	–	10	.444	15	–	15	.500
Georgetown	6	–	12	.333	15	–	16	.484
Pittsburgh	5	–	13	.278	14	–	16	.467
West Virginia	4	–	14	.222	10	–	19	.345
Boston College	3	–	15	.167	6	–	21	.222
† 1999 Big East tournament winner As of March 29, 1999; Rankings from AP Poll

The 1998–99 Notre Dame Fighting Irish Men's Basketball Team represented the University of Notre Dame in the 1998–99 NCAA Division I men's basketball season.

== Schedule ==
Date time, TV	Rank^{#}	Opponent^{#}	Result	Record	Site city, state
November 13*		Miami (OH)	L 65–76	0–1	Joyce Center; South Bend, IN
November 15*		Yale	W 64–62	1–1	Joyce Center; South Bend, IN
November 21*		at Vanderbilt	L 63–68	1–2	Memorial Gymnasium
November 26*		vs. Duke	L 82–111	1–3	Sullivan Arena; Anchorage, Alaska
November 27*		at Alaska-Anchorage	L 82–88 ^{OT}	1–4	Sullivan Arena; Anchorage, Alaska
November 28*		vs. Southern Utah	W 81–77	2–4	Sullivan Arena; Anchorage, Alaska
December 1*		No. 16 Indiana	L 72–76 ^{OT}	2–5	Joyce Center; South Bend, IN
December 5*		Central Michigan	W 83–56	3–5	Joyce Center; South Bend, IN
December 8		at Providence	W 83–80	4–5 (1–0)	Dunkin' Donuts Center; Providence, RI
December 19*		Eastern Kentucky	W 82–77	5–5 (1–0)	Joyce Center; South Bend, IN
December 21*		Stetson	W 79–55	6–5 (1–0)	Joyce Center; South Bend, IN
December 27*		St. Francis (NY)	W 99–88	7–5 (1–0)	Joyce Center; South Bend, IN
December 29		No. 22 Syracuse	L 63–75	7–6 (1–1)	Joyce Center; South Bend, IN
January 5		Pittsburgh	W 87–64	8–6 (2–1)	Joyce Center; South Bend, IN
January 7		Villanova	L 62–93	8–7 (2–2)	Joyce Center; South Bend, IN
January 9		at Miami (FL)	W 71–68	9–7 (3–2)	Miami Arena; Miami, Florida
January 12		at No. 1 Connecticut	L 70–101	9–8 (3–3)	Harry A. Gampel Pavilion; Storrs, Connecticut
January 16		at Villanova	L 58–85	9–9 (3–4)	Wells Fargo Center; Philadelphia, Pennsylvania
January 19		Seton Hall	W 59–56	10–9 (4–4)	Joyce Center; South Bend, IN
January 23		Rutgers	L 70–72	10–10 (4–5)	Joyce Center; South Bend, IN
January 27		at Boston College	L 67–78	10–11 (4–6)	Silvio O. Conte Forum; Boston, Massachusetts
January 30		Providence	W 81–62	11–11 (5–6)	Joyce Center; South Bend, IN
February 6		at Seton Hall	W 76–60	12–11 (6–6)	Continental Airlines Arena; East Rutherford, NJ
February 10		Georgetown	L 53–62	12–12 (6–7)	Joyce Center; South Bend, IN
February 14		at West Virginia	L 80–85	13–12 (7–7)	WVU Coliseum; Morgantown, WV
February 17		at No. 21 Syracuse	L 65–71	13–13 (7–8)	Carrier Dome; Syracuse, NY
February 21		West Virginia	W 71–69	14–13 (8–8)	Joyce Center; South Bend, IN
February 24		at No. 8 St. John’s (NY)	L 53–73	14–14 (8–9)	Madison Square Garden; New York, NY
February 28		Boston College	W 78–59	15–14 (9–9)	Joyce Center; South Bend, IN
Big East tournament
March 3		vs. Seton Hall	L 69–79	15–15 (9–9)	Madison Square Garden; New York, NY
*Non-conference game. ^{#}Rankings from AP Poll. (#) Tournament seedings in parentheses.
