= Vance–Granville Community College =

Public college in Henderson, North Carolina, US

Coordinates: 36.3235806°N 78.4886912°W

Vance–Granville Community College (VGCC) is a public community college in Henderson, North Carolina. It is part of the North Carolina Community College System and serves Vance, Granville, Franklin, and Warren counties. It was established in 1969 by the North Carolina General Assembly as Vance County Technical Institute (VCTI). VGCC is accredited by the Southern Association of Colleges and Schools to award associate degrees.

== History ==
After Vance County was unsuccessful in persuading the state of North Carolina to support a community college in Vance, community leaders managed to obtain a "technical institute" in 1968. The General Assembly officially established the new school on July 1, 1969. Local educator William D. Payne was named acting president until a permanent leader, Donald Mohorn, could be hired.

VCTI moved into its first permanent home in January 1970: a renovated hospital building in downtown Henderson. From those humble beginnings, Vance-Granville has become a key player in economic development in the four counties its serves. Throughout its history, the college has sought to provide better opportunities for citizens to learn and to train for meaningful employment.

The college began by offering technical, vocational and continuing education courses to residents of Vance County. In 1972, Vance and Granville counties pooled their resources to support a $2 million bond referendum for a larger, more permanent facility (to be called Vance-Granville Technical Institute) to educate residents of both counties. The ultimate result, combined with the legislature's approving the addition of a college-transfer program, was the construction and subsequent opening of the new Vance–Granville Community College campus in 1976 on an 83-acre (340,000 m^{2}) tract in Vance County, midway between Henderson and Oxford, off Interstate 85.

With this location still serving as the college's main campus, Vance-Granville has experienced significant progress over the years. In fact, phenomenal growth in its physical facilities and student enrollment necessitated a move in 1978 to expand its offerings to include the populace of Franklin and Warren counties.

Today, the main campus, picturesque with a lake and attractive landscaping, has nine permanent buildings that include a student services complex, civic center and daycare unit. Along with administrative and faculty offices, auditorium, student lounge and learning resources center, these facilities provide 36 classrooms, 10 shops and 20 labs in which students may train in 35-plus curriculum programs, as well as extension, economic development, continuing education, and small business classes. Its total value is approximately $33 million.

In 2000, voters approved a Higher Education Facilities bond, from which VGCC received $17.1 million over the next six years. These funds have led to construction on all four campuses.

=== Satellite campuses ===
Vance-Granville also maintains three satellite campuses: South Campus, located between Butner and Creedmoor in Granville County; Warren County Campus, which operates in downtown Warrenton; and Franklin County Campus, situated on NC Highway 56 just outside Louisburg.

Calling an 11-acre (45,000 m^{2}) tract home, South Campus is a single-story, semicircular structure that houses classrooms, shops/labs, offices and a reception area. In 2000, an 8,050-square-foot (748 m^{2}) addition was constructed to provide space for an expanded cosmetology department, computer lab and EMS/Public Service classroom. In addition, the Granville County Library South Branch occupies one section of the complex. Like all of the other campuses, South has an Early College high school.

Occupying three one-story brick buildings totaling more than 14,000 square feet (1,300 m^{2}), Warren County Campus encompasses general classrooms, an ABE/GED learning/testing center, labs, multi-purpose shop, reception areas and offices.

Franklin County Campus, located on a scenic 22-acre (89,000 m^{2}) site, has a two-building, 34,000-square-foot (3,200 m^{2}) complex that opened its doors to students in Fall 1998. It contains general classrooms, vocational, computer and science labs, a childcare center, computer and conference room, book store, and faculty and administrative offices, and other skills training areas. In the spring of 2001, a new biotechnology lab and classroom building were added along with a multipurpose building.

Since their formal dedication in the fall of 1988, both South Campus and Warren Campus have been renovated, enlarged and improved to accommodate a growing number of students. Franklin Campus, which first opened its doors to students in 1991, shared space in the Louisburg Human Services Building before moving in 1998 to its permanent new home. The combined value of these three campuses is approximately $7.3 million.

The school's nickname is the Vanguards.

=== Presidents ===
- Donald R. Mohorn, Aug. 3, 1969-July 15, 1979
- Thomas B. Carroll, Sept. 4, 1979-May 6, 1980
- Benjamin F. Currin, Feb. 1, 1981-Jan. 1999
- Robert A. Miller, Feb. 1, 1999-Sept. 2004
- G.R. 'Randy' Parker, Sept. 2004-Sept. 2011
- Stelfanie Williams, Feb. 2012–Aug. 2018
- Rachel Desmarais, 2019-present

== Academics ==
Generally, Vance-Granville's programs are categorized as either "continuing education" (also previously called "Community & Economic Development") or "curriculum." In curriculum programs, students might work for several months up to 2 years (if attending full-time) for certificates, diplomas and degrees.

== Athletics ==
VGCC is a member of the National Junior College Athletic Association in Region 10. Its first NJCAA sport was men's basketball. VGCC's teams are nicknamed the "Vanguards."
