= 1998–99 Pittsburgh Panthers men's basketball team =

American college basketball season

1998–99 Pittsburgh Panthers men's basketball
- Conference: Big East Conference (1979–2013)
- Record: 14–16 (5–13 Big East)
- Head coach: Ralph Willard (5th season)
- Assistant coaches: Jim Christian (3rd season); Troy Weaver (3rd season); Oliver Antigua (1st season)
- Home arena: Fitzgerald Field House (Capacity: 4,122)

1998–99 Big East men's basketball standings
	Conf.				Overall
Team	W		L	PCT	W		L	PCT
No. 3 Connecticut†	16	–	2	.889	34	–	2	.944
No. 10 Miami (FL)	15	–	3	.833	23	–	7	.767
No. 9 St. John's	14	–	4	.778	28	–	9	.757
Syracuse	10	–	8	.556	21	–	12	.636
Villanova	10	–	8	.556	21	–	11	.656
Rutgers	9	–	9	.500	19	–	13	.594
Providence	9	–	9	.500	16	–	14	.533
Notre Dame	8	–	10	.444	14	–	16	.467
Seton Hall	8	–	10	.444	15	–	15	.500
Georgetown	6	–	12	.333	15	–	16	.484
Pittsburgh	5	–	13	.278	14	–	16	.467
West Virginia	4	–	14	.222	10	–	19	.345
Boston College	3	–	15	.167	6	–	21	.222
† 1999 Big East tournament winner As of March 29, 1999; Rankings from AP Poll

The 1998–99 Pittsburgh Panthers men's basketball team represented the University of Pittsburgh in the 1998–99 NCAA Division I men's basketball season. Led by head coach Ralph Willard, the Panthers finished with a record of 14–16.
