= Anthony Glover =

American basketball player (born 1979)

Anthony Levar Glover (born January 28, 1979) is an American former professional basketball player.

Anthony Glover attended Rice High School (Manhattan) where he was named Mr. New York Basketball. While there he won two state titles. He participated in various tournaments including the Burger King Classic. He moved on to the 1998–99 St. John's Red Storm men's basketball team but was ineligible his first year. He ended his year with the 2002–03 St. John's Red Storm men's basketball team. His team played in the NCAA Tournament for at least 1 year. Glover lead St. John's to its last NIT Title. During his time at St. John's he averaged 11.2 ppg and 5.9 rpg.

== Professional career ==
Glover earned the name the Corrections Officer while playing basketball for his defensive prowess. He was selected by the United States Basketball League draft and played for the Brooklyn Kings. He later played for the South Korea's Anyang SBS Stars. He later played in Iceland and France but made a name with Argentina under the Ciclista Olimpico de la Banda.
