= Rice High School (Manhattan) =

- The edifice of the former Rice High School.

Location
- 74 West 124th Street; Harlem, Manhattan, New York City, New York 10027; United States; 40°48′24.5″N 73°56′44″W

Information
- Type: Private, all-male
- Religious affiliations: Catholic; Congregation of Christian Brothers
- Established: 1938
- Status: Closed
- Closed: 2011
- Grades: 9-12
- Colors: Green and gold
- Nickname: Raiders
- Publication: Rice Connections Magazine
- Newspaper: Rice Newsletter

Rice High School was a private, Catholic, college preparatory high school in the Harlem neighborhood of New York City, United States. It is located within the Archdiocese of New York. The school closed in 2011 due to financial difficulties.

== Background ==
Rice High School was established in 1938 in Central Harlem by the Congregation of Christian Brothers, who continued to fund the school through much of its existence. Named for Irish missionary and educator Edmund Rice, it was located at 124th Street and Lenox Avenue and was known as a basketball powerhouse producing alumni that included Kemba Walker. The school's basketball team won the CHSAA championship in 1994 with a roster that included Felipe López.

The school was the subject of a 2008 book by Patrick McCloskey, The Street Stops Here: A Year at a Catholic High School in Harlem.

Amid declining enrollment, reduced endowment and increasing operational costs, the school made the decision to close in 2011 after they could not raise the needed funds to move to a cheaper building. It held its final graduation ceremony on May 27, 2011 and vacated the building on June 30 of that same year.

As of August 2021, a group of alumni are working to reopen the school, although there is no clear timeline for this.

== Notable alumni and staff ==
- Shagari Alleyne, basketball player, Class of 2003
- Andre Barrett, basketball player, Class of 2000
- Steve Burtt Jr., basketball player, 2007-08 top scorer in the Israel Basketball Premier League, Class of 2002
- Bill Campion, basketball player, Class of 1971
- Keydren Clark, basketball player, Class of 2002
- Nelson A. Diaz, Esq. - Former Philadelphia City Solicitor, Court of Common Pleas Judge and General Counsel of HUD
- Chris Fouch, basketball player, Class of 2008
- Anthony Glover, basketball player, Class of 1998
- Tom Gorman, baseball player and umpire, former coach at Rice
- Charles Hamilton, hip hop artist, Class of 2005
- Kadeem Jack, basketball player, Class of 2010
- Curtis Kelly, basketball player, Class of 2006
- Bob Lienhard, basketball player, Class of 1966
- Felipe López, basketball player, Class of 1994
- Darryl McDaniels, founding member of the hip hop group Run–D.M.C.
- David Freeman Wooley, director, producer, author and entrepreneur, Class of 1978
- Dean Meminger, basketball player and coach, Class of 1967
- Russell Robinson, basketball player, Class of 2004
- Kenny Satterfield, basketball player, Class of 1999
- Durand Scott, basketball player, Class of 2009
- Edgar Sosa, basketball player, Class of 2006
- Kemba Walker, basketball player, Class of 2008
- Charlie Yelverton, basketball player, Class of 1967
