= Erick Barkley =

American basketball player (born 1978)

Personal information
- Born: February 21, 1978 (age 48) Brooklyn, New York, U.S.
- Listed height: 6 ft 1 in (1.85 m)
- Listed weight: 177 lb (80 kg)

Career information
- High school: Christ the King (Queens, New York); Maine Central Institute (Pittsfield, Maine)
- College: St. John's (1998–2000)
- NBA draft: 2000: 1st round, 28th overall pick
- Drafted by: Portland Trail Blazers
- Playing career: 2000–2011
- Position: Point guard
- Number: 21, 12

Career history
- 2000–2002: Portland Trail Blazers
- 2002: Peristeri
- 2003–2004: Huntsville Flight
- 2004–2005: Olympia Larissa
- 2006: Ironi Ramat Gan
- 2006: Sion Hérens Basket
- 2006–2007: Indiana Alley Cats
- 2007: Split
- 2008: CSU Asesoft Ploiești
- 2008: Kotwica Kołobrzeg
- 2008: Basket Kwidzyn
- 2008–2009: Starogard Gdański
- 2011: Laval Kebs

Career highlights
- First-team All-Big East (2000); Big East All-Rookie Team (1999); McDonald's All-American (1998); CBA All-Star Game (2007)
- Stats at NBA.com
- Stats at Basketball Reference
Medals
Men's basketball
Representing United States
Summer Universiade
Gold medal – first place	1999 Palma	Team competition

Erick Barkley (born February 21, 1978) is an American former professional basketball player. Born in New York City, raised in the Farragut housing project in Brooklyn, he played high school basketball at Christ the King Regional High School and the Maine Central Institute and college basketball at St. John's University. He was named First Team All-Big East and an All-American honorable mention in 2000. Barkley was drafted by the Portland Trail Blazers in 2000, and played for the team for two seasons.

== Career ==
In high school, Barkley was a starter on the AAU team the Riverside Hawks, along with future professional basketball players Lamar Odom, Ron Artest, Elton Brand, and Anthony Glover. In 1996, the team went 66–1 in AAU play. Barkley and Artest would both later star at St. John's together, and led the team to the Elite Eight in the 1999 NCAA Tournament.

During the 2000 NBA draft, Barkley was selected in the first round (28^{th} pick overall) by the Portland Trail Blazers. After two seasons with Portland, he was traded with Steve Kerr and a 2003 second-round pick to the San Antonio Spurs for Antonio Daniels, Amal McCaskill and Charles Smith on August 5, 2002. The Spurs traded Barkley to the Chicago Bulls on October 26, 2002, but he was waived the same day.

His final NBA game was played on April 17, 2002, in a 92 - 79 win over the Houston Rockets where he recorded 7 points, 3 assists and 2 steals. In total, Barkley only played in the NBA for 2 years, playing 27 games during his career and averaged 2.9 points per game with 1.5 assists and 0.9 rebounds per game.

Barkley played for the G.S. Olympia Larissa B.C. in Larissa, Greece during the 2004–05 season until he was expelled from the league for possessing cannabis. He played his final professional season in 2011 for the Quebec Kebs of the National Basketball League of Canada. When Barkley told team management he was planning to retire due to injuries, he was persuaded to finish out the season as a player-coach.
