= John Celestand =

American basketball player

Personal information
- Born: March 6, 1977 (age 49) Houston, Texas, U.S.
- Listed height: 6 ft 4 in (1.93 m)
- Listed weight: 178 lb (81 kg)

Career information
- High school: Piscataway Township (Piscataway, New Jersey)
- College: Villanova (1995–1999)
- NBA draft: 1999: 2nd round, 30th overall pick
- Drafted by: Los Angeles Lakers
- Playing career: 1999–2005
- Position: Point guard
- Number: 11

Career history
- 1999–2000: Los Angeles Lakers
- 2000: New Mexico Slam
- 2000–2001: Phantoms Braunschweig
- 2001: Skipper Bologna
- 2001–2002: ASVEL Villeurbanne
- 2002–2003: Alba Berlin
- 2003–2004: BC Kyiv
- 2004–2005: Phantoms Braunschweig

Career highlights
- NBA champion (2000)
- Stats at NBA.com
- Stats at Basketball Reference

John Celestand (/ˈsɛləˌstænd/, SELL-ə-stand; born March 6, 1977) is an American former professional basketball player.

A 6-foot-4-inch (1.93 m) point guard, Celestand attended Piscataway High School in Piscataway, New Jersey before playing collegiately at Villanova University. Celestand was selected by the Los Angeles Lakers with the No. 30 overall pick of the 1999 NBA draft. He was a member of the Lakers' 1999–2000 championship team, and spent several years playing professionally in Italy—for Skipper Bologna for two months in late 2001—, France and Germany.

Celestand is currently living in New Jersey. He is the co-owner of the company All-State Basketball, where he trains young aspiring basketball players in Central New Jersey. He works as an announcer for ESPN Plus and ESPNU covering college basketball games. He is also a studio analyst on 76ers Post Game Live for Comcast Sportsnet Philadelphia. In addition, John is the color analyst for IMG College Radio covering the National Big East Game of the Week and MSG Varsity covering high school basketball in New Jersey.

A former coach of the Central Jersey Jammers AAU team based in New Brunswick, New Jersey, he still helps out with various basketball organizations around central New Jersey. He is a member of the "I Can Foundation", a non-profit organization created in 2005 to encourage the importance of literacy among inner-city youth and also works as a motivational speaker throughout New Jersey. In addition John works with Heroes and Cool Kids, a non-profit company based in North Jersey which mentors high school student athletes. He is also a program associate with the Rutgers Future Scholars program mentoring future first-generation college students in the New Brunswick and Piscataway, NJ areas.

John also serves as president of his own company, Celestand Consulting. Through Celestand Consulting, John does motivational speaking and puts together seminars on education and character development all across the tri-state area. Mr. Celestand has been a featured speaker at Columbia University, Rutgers University, Villanova University, Rider University, Drexel University, Middlesex County College, and Kean University. He has also spoken at over 30 high schools and middle schools all across the state of New Jersey.
