= Tim James (basketball) =

American basketball player and coach (born 1976)

Personal information
- Born: December 25, 1976 (age 49) Miami, Florida, U.S.
- Listed height: 6 ft 7 in (2.01 m)
- Listed weight: 212 lb (96 kg)

Career information
- High school: Miami Northwestern (Miami, Florida)
- College: Miami (Florida) (1995–1999)
- NBA draft: 1999: 1st round, 25th overall pick
- Drafted by: Miami Heat
- Playing career: 1999–2007
- Position: Small forward
- Number: 40, 25, 23

Career history

Playing
- 1999–2000: Miami Heat
- 2000–2001: Charlotte Hornets
- 2001: Philadelphia 76ers
- 2003: Tekelspor
- 2007: Cocodrilos de Caracas
- 2007: Hamamatsu Phoenix
- 2007: Ironi Ashkelon

Coaching
- 2011–2012: Vance-Granville CC

Career highlights
- Third-team All-American – AP, NABC (1999); Big East co-Player of the Year (1999); 2× First-team All-Big East (1998, 1999); Second-team All-Big East (1997); No. 40 retired by Miami Hurricanes; Third-team Parade All-American (1995)
- Stats at NBA.com
- Stats at Basketball Reference

Tim O'Connor James (born December 25, 1976) is an American former professional basketball player and United States Army specialist and former head coach of the Vance-Granville Community College men's basketball team. In a three-year National Basketball Association career, he played for the Miami Heat, Charlotte Hornets, and Philadelphia 76ers. He also played professional basketball in Japan, Turkey, and Israel.

== Basketball career ==
He played high school basketball at Miami Northwestern High School and collegiate basketball at the University of Miami. In the 1999 NBA draft, the Miami Heat picked James as the 25th pick overall, and James played with that team during his rookie season (1999–2000). He signed with the Charlotte Hornets the next season and the Philadelphia 76ers the next. The 76ers cut James in 2001. James then played abroad: for Tekelspor of the Turkish Basketball League in 2003, Cocodrilos de Caracas of LPBV, Hamamatsu Phoenix of the Japanese bj League, and Ironi Ashkelon of the Israeli Basketball Super League.

James was inducted into the University of Miami Sports Hall of Fame in 2009.

== Military career ==
James later served in Iraq after enlisting in the U.S. Army. An article by Dan Le Batard detailed his choices leading him to joining the military, including his decision not to tell his fellow soldiers about his NBA experience. On March 19, 2011, James was honored with a pre-game ceremony in Miami, before his former team played the Denver Nuggets.

== Coaching career ==
James was named head basketball coach for Vance-Granville Community College in North Carolina in 2011.
