= Etan Thomas =

American basketball player (born 1978)

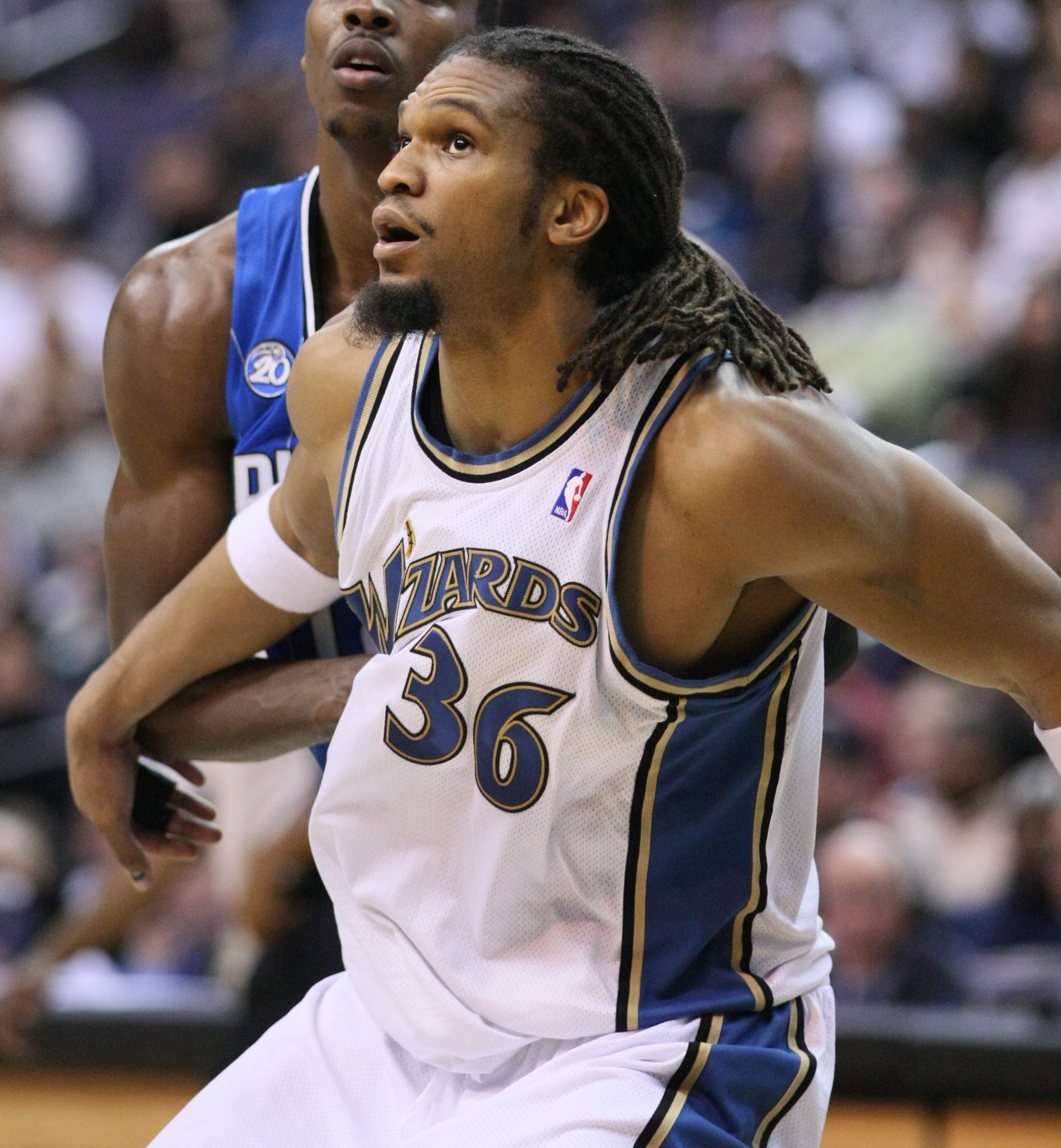
- Thomas with the Washington Wizards in 2008

Personal information
- Born: April 1, 1978 (age 48) New York City, New York, U.S.
- Listed height: 6 ft 10 in (2.08 m)
- Listed weight: 260 lb (118 kg)

Career information
- High school: Booker T. Washington (Tulsa, Oklahoma)
- College: Syracuse (1996–2000)
- NBA draft: 2000: 1st round, 12th overall pick
- Drafted by: Dallas Mavericks
- Playing career: 2000–2011
- Position: Center / power forward
- Number: 36

Career history
- 2001–2009: Washington Wizards
- 2009–2010: Oklahoma City Thunder
- 2010–2011: Atlanta Hawks

Career highlights
- Third-team All-American – NABC (2000); First-team All-Big East (2000); 2× Big East Defensive Player of the Year (1999, 2000); Big East Most Improved Player (1998)

Career NBA statistics
- Points: 2,341 (5.7 ppg)
- Rebounds: 1,927 (4.7 rpg)
- Blocks: 427 (1.0 bpg)
- Stats at NBA.com
- Stats at Basketball Reference

Dedrick Etan Thomas (born April 1, 1978) is an American former professional basketball player who played for the Washington Wizards, Oklahoma City Thunder, and Atlanta Hawks of the National Basketball Association (NBA). He is also a published poet, freelance writer, activist, and motivational speaker, as well as a co-host of Centers of Attention, a sports talk show on ESPN Radio Syracuse in Syracuse, New York, alongside former professional basketball player Danny Schayes.

== Early life ==
His name is derived from the 18th dynasty "heretic pharaoh" Akhenaten, an ancient Egyptian king.

== Career ==
=== College ===
Thomas played his college basketball at Syracuse University from 1996 to 2000, where he averaged 11 points per game and almost seven rebounds per game and graduated with a degree in business management. In his sophomore season, he was named the Big East Most Improved Player; in his junior and senior years he was named Big East Defensive Player of the Year. At the end of his Syracuse career, Thomas was drafted 12th overall in the 2000 NBA draft by the Dallas Mavericks. He also played basketball at Booker T. Washington High School in Tulsa, OK, where he was a teammate of De'mond Parker, R. W. McQuarters and Ryan Humphrey.

=== Professional career ===
Without ever playing a game for the Mavericks, he was traded to the Washington Wizards in 2001. He would play for Washington for the next 8 years (technically 7, as he sat out the entire 2007–2008 season due to injury), with his best season being in 2003–2004 when he averaged 8.9 points and 6.7 rebounds. Although Thomas never averaged 1.0 assists in a season, that 03–04 season was the closest he came to it, recording 68 assists in 79 games, for a season average of 0.9.

During the Wizards' training camp for the 2007–08 NBA season, a routine physical examination discovered that he had a leaking aortic valve. On October 11, 2007, Thomas successfully underwent open heart surgery. He returned to play for the Wizards on October 29, 2008, a full year after his surgery. In his first game back, he had 10 points and eight rebounds.

On June 23, 2009, he was traded along with Oleksiy Pecherov, Darius Songaila, and a first-round draft pick to the Minnesota Timberwolves for Randy Foye and Mike Miller.

A month later on July 27, 2009, he was traded to the Oklahoma City Thunder along with a 2010 second-round draft pick and a conditional 2010 second-round draft pick in exchange for guards Chucky Atkins and Damien Wilkins.

On September 2, 2010, it was announced that the Atlanta Hawks had signed Thomas. His tenure with the Hawks (2010–2011) would be his final season in the NBA. That season, he played 13 games for Atlanta while averaging 2.5 points and 1.8 rebounds. His final NBA game was played on April 16, 2011, in Game 1 of the Eastern Conference First Round against the Orlando Magic. Thomas played for 6 and half minutes and the only stat he recorded was 1 rebound in a 103–93 victory over Orlando. He would sit out for the remainder of the playoffs and the Atlanta Hawks were eventually eliminated in the Semi-Finals in 6 games by the Chicago Bulls.

== Other work ==
In 2005, Thomas released a book of poetry titled More Than an Athlete: Poems by Etan Thomas which included works critical of former Wizards head coach Doug Collins.

In 2012, Thomas co-authored the autobiography Fatherhood: Rising to the Ultimate Challenge, which he discusses his fatherless childhood and the importance of fatherhood.

Since 2020, Thomas has been a writer and podcaster for Basketballnews.com.

In 2022 he published: Police Brutality and White Supremacy: The Fight Against American Traditions.

== Personal life ==
A Baptist, Thomas is a member of the First Baptist Church of Glenarden and is involved in facilitating youth forums.

== Political activism and social causes ==
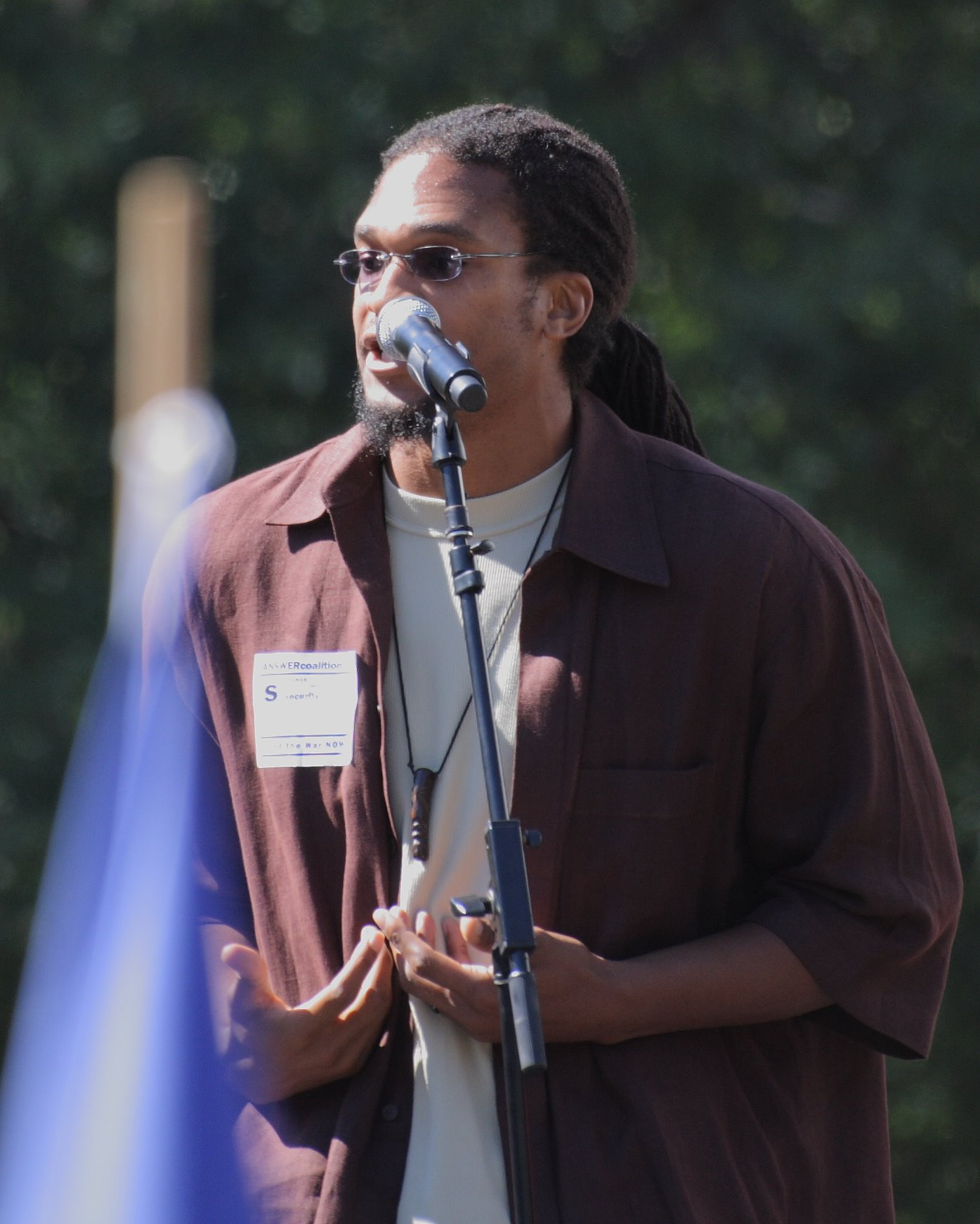
Thomas at an anti-war protest in 2007

Thomas says that he became an oralist when, after he was detained and humiliated by police officers in high school, his speech teacher had him sort and verbalize his feelings into a speech. The Tulsa World Newspaper published a story on his experience. His mother spoke with him about activists who used their positions as athletes to amplify their reach, such as Kareem Abdul-Jabbar, Muhammad Ali, Bill Russell, and Jim Brown.

In his book, More Than an Athlete, Thomas discusses how the National Collegiate Athletic Association (NCAA) runs as a business, and not to the service of the student athletes. After his wife was injured in college, the NCAA fought to take away her scholarship, and therefore, her ability to pay for and attend college. He points out the hypocrisy in an organization who makes billions a year and claims that there is not enough funding available for their main sources of profit, the athletes.

In September 2005, Thomas was one of several celebrities to speak at an anti-war rally in Washington, D.C. He also spoke out at the September 15, 2007 anti-war protest in Washington, D.C. He blogs for The Huffington Post. Thomas said he was inclined to be against the Iraq War, as he felt there was no clear reason to invade the country and the fact that some of his brother's friends who were deployed to Iraq, and upon learning about how terrified they were, decided to begin speaking out.

Thomas actively supported Barack Obama's 2008 campaign for U.S. president. On August 16, 2008, he appeared with Democratic National Committee chair Howard Dean at stops in northern Virginia as part of the Democratic National Committee's "Register for Change" bus tour to encourage local voter registration drives. Thomas gave speeches at two stops in Fairfax County and the City of Alexandria.

In January 2010, Thomas donated $30,000 to the Haiti relief efforts after the 2010 Haiti earthquake.

Thomas is an advocate against police brutality.

== NBA career statistics ==
Legend
GP	Games played	GS	Games started	MPG	Minutes per game
FG%	Field goal percentage	3P%	3-point field goal percentage	FT%	Free throw percentage
RPG	Rebounds per game	APG	Assists per game	SPG	Steals per game
BPG	Blocks per game	PPG	Points per game	**Bold**	Career high

=== Regular season ===
Year	Team	GP	GS	MPG	FG%	3P%	FT%	RPG	APG	SPG	BPG	PPG
2001–02	Washington	47	0	13.1	.536	—	.554	3.9	.1	.4	.7	4.3
2002–03	Washington	38	0	13.5	.492	—	.638	4.3	.1	.2	.6	4.8
2003–04	Washington	**79**	15	**24.1**	.489	—	.647	**6.7**	**.9**	**.5**	**1.6**	**8.9**
2004–05	Washington	47	10	20.8	.502	—	.528	5.2	.4	.4	1.1	7.1
2005–06	Washington	71	9	15.8	.533	—	.600	3.9	.2	.3	1.0	4.7
2006–07	Washington	65	**32**	19.2	**.574**	—	.558	5.8	.4	.3	1.4	6.1
2008–09	Washington	26	7	11.8	.485	—	.696	2.5	.2	.1	.7	3.1
2009–10	Oklahoma City	23	1	14.0	.456	—	.591	2.8	.0	.2	.7	3.3
2010–11	Atlanta	13	0	6.3	.476	—	**.800**	1.8	.2	.1	.3	2.5
Career		409	74	17.3	.513	—	.603	4.8	.4	.3	1.0	5.7

=== Playoffs ===
Year	Team	GP	GS	MPG	FG%	3P%	FT%	RPG	APG	SPG	BPG	PPG
2005	Washington	**8**	0	15.8	**.655**	—	.455	4.5	**.3**	.0	**.9**	**6.0**
2006	Washington	3	0	6.0	.400	—	.500	2.0	.0	**.7**	.7	2.0
2007	Washington	4	**4**	**21.0**	.412	—	**.667**	**5.5**	**.3**	.5	.8	5.0
2010	Oklahoma City	2	0	8.5	**.833**	—	**1.000**	2.0	.0	.0	.0	**6.0**
2011	Atlanta	1	0	7.0	.000	—	—	1.0	.0	.0	.0	.0
Career		18	4	14.0	.559	.000	.541	3.8	.2	.2	.7	4.8

== See also ==
- List of NCAA Division I men's basketball career blocks leaders
