= Kevin Freeman (basketball) =

American basketball player and coach

Personal information
- Born: March 3, 1978 (age 48) Springfield, Massachusetts, U.S.
- Listed height: 6 ft 7 in (2.01 m)
- Listed weight: 235 lb (107 kg)

Career information
- High school: Paterson Catholic (Paterson, New Jersey)
- College: UConn (1996–2000)
- NBA draft: 2000: undrafted
- Playing career: 2000–2010
- Position: Power forward

Career history

Playing
- 2000–2001: Los Angeles Stars
- 2001: Tanduay Rhum Masters
- 2001–2002: Sutor Basket Montegranaro
- 2001–2002: Basket Club Ferrara
- 2002–2005: Brisbane Bullets
- 2004: Westchester Wildfire
- 2005–2006: Aris B.C.
- 2006: San Miguel Beermen
- 2006–2007: Zhejiang Horses
- 2007: Cocodrilos de Caracas
- 2007: Leones de Ponce
- 2007–2008: Estudiantes de Bahía Blanca
- 2007–2008: Andrea Costa Imola
- 2008: Cocodrilos de Caracas
- 2008–2009: Ángeles de Puebla
- 2009: Cocodrilos de Caracas
- 2009–2010: Tenerife CB
- 2009–2010: Espartanos de Margarita
- 2010: Cocodrilos de Caracas

Coaching
- 2011–2012: UConn (assistant DBO)
- 2012–2018: UConn (DBO)
- 2018–2020: Penn State (assistant)
- 2020–2021: UConn (assistant)

Career highlights
- All-NBL Third Team (2004); NCAA champion (1999); Albert Schweitzer Tournament MVP (1996)

Kevin Freeman (born March 3, 1978) is an American former basketball player and coach. He played professionally for eleven years in several countries and as a collegian was a starter on UConn's first NCAA championship team.

== College career ==
Freeman, a 6' 7" power forward from Paterson Catholic High School in Paterson, New Jersey but also played at Longmeadow High School in Massachusetts, played collegiate basketball at the University of Connecticut for Hall of Fame coach Jim Calhoun. He started for the majority of his four years there. As a junior in the 1998–99 NCAA Division I men's basketball season, Freeman averaged a career-high 12.2 points and 7.3 rebounds per game. He led the Huskies to a Big East Conference tournament championship, and was named the tournament Most Valuable Player. Connecticut then went on to win the 1999 NCAA basketball tournament, with Freeman gaining All-West Regional honors to get the Huskies to the Final Four.

Following the Huskies' championship year, Freeman was named to the USA men's basketball team at the 1999 World University Games in Palma de Mallorca, Spain. He played in all eight contests, averaging 8.0 points and 4.4 rebounds per game as Team USA won the Gold Medal.

Freeman returned to Storrs as Husky co-captain for his senior season, averaging 11.0 points and 5.7 rebounds per game. Kevin Freeman left UConn with 1,476 points and 913 rebounds, and graduated as the school's all-time leader in games played with 140.

== Professional career ==
Following the close of his college career, Freeman began a far-reaching professional career that led him to play in the Philippines, Greece, Italy, Argentina, China, Mexico, Spain, Puerto Rico, South Korea and Venezuela. Some of his best work came in the National Basketball League of Australia as a member of the Brisbane Bullets. Freeman was a big scorer in the league, including finishing top five in scoring for the 2003–04 season (22.3 points per game).

== Coaching career ==
After retiring from basketball, Freeman turned to coaching. He was named to Jim Calhoun's staff just prior to the 2011–12 season as Assistant Director of Basketball Operations. On June 4, 2018, Penn State Head Coach Patrick Chambers announced that Freeman was joining the staff as an assistant coach. On September 2, 2020 head coach Dan Hurley announced that Kevin Freeman was coming home to be an assistant basketball coach for the UConn Huskies men's basketball program.
