= Khalid El-Amin =

American basketball player (born 1979)

Personal information
- Born: April 25, 1979 (age 47) Minneapolis, Minnesota, U.S.
- Listed height: 5 ft 10 in (1.78 m)
- Listed weight: 200 lb (91 kg)

Career information
- High school: Minneapolis North (Minneapolis, Minnesota)
- College: UConn (1997–2000)
- NBA draft: 2000: 2nd round, 34th overall pick
- Drafted by: Chicago Bulls
- Playing career: 2000–2017
- Position: Point guard
- Number: 2

Career history
- 2000–2001: Chicago Bulls
- 2001–2002: Dakota Wizards
- 2002: Gary Steelheads
- 2002: Strasbourg IG
- 2002–2003: Ironi Ramat Gan
- 2003–2005: Beşiktaş Cola Turka
- 2005–2007: Azovmash Mariupol
- 2007–2008: Türk Telekom
- 2008–2009: Azovmash Mariupol
- 2009: Türk Telekom
- 2009–2010: Budivelnyk Kyiv
- 2010–2011: Lietuvos Rytas
- 2011–2012: Cibona Zagreb
- 2012–2013: Le Mans
- 2013: Trabzonspor
- 2014–2015: BG Göttingen
- 2015: Sigal Prishtina
- 2015–2016: BG Göttingen
- 2017: Marinos de Anzoátegui

Career highlights
- All-BBL Second Team (2015); EuroCup Top Scorer (2009); All-EuroCup Second Team (2009); LKL All-Star (2011); 2× Ukrainian League champion (2006, 2007); A-1 Liga champion (2012); Ukrainian Cup MVP (2009); 2× Ukrainian Cup winner (2006, 2009); Turkish Cup winner (2008); Turkish Cup Final MVP (2008); 2× BSL All-Star (2005, 2008); 3× FIBA EuroCup All-Star (2005–2007); BSL All-Star Game MVP (2005); First-team All-Big East (2000); NCAA champion (1999); McDonald's All-American (1997); Third-team Parade All-American (1997); Minnesota Mr. Basketball (1997)
- Stats at NBA.com
- Stats at Basketball Reference
Medals
Men's basketball
Representing United States
Goodwill Games
Gold medal – first place	1998 New York	Team competition

Khalid El-Amin (born April 25, 1979) is a retired American professional basketball player. He was a member of the 1999 University of Connecticut men's basketball team that won the NCAA championship.

He is originally from Minnesota, where he played for North High School in Minneapolis. In 2000, he was selected in the 2nd round by the Chicago Bulls of the NBA draft and played 50 games for them, averaging 6.3 points and 2.9 assists per game. He later played professionally in several countries, mainly in Europe.

Since retiring as a player, he has coached high school basketball in Minnesota, with last stint at St. Thomas Academy in Mendota Heights lasting 3 years. In 2023, He was named the head coach of the men's basketball team at Anoka-Ramsey Community College in Minnesota. In his first coaching year at Anoka Ramsey, He brought the team to the NJCAA playoffs, where they lost in the first round to Central Lakes College at the overtime.

== College career ==
After leading Minneapolis North HS to three straight state titles and being named a McDonald's All-American, the three-time Minnesota State Player of the Year and 1997 Minnesota Mr. Basketball was named Big East Conference Rookie of the Year while being second in the team in scoring (16.0) and setting the UConn single-season scoring record for a freshman.

As a sophomore, El-Amin was the starting point guard on their team that won the 1999 NCAA Championship game over Duke. In the final game he scored the Huskies' final 4 points in their 77–74 victory.

In 2000 El-Amin led the Huskies in scoring (16.0), assists (4.4) and steals (1.7) and was named to the All-Big East first team. He was also one of 15 finalists for the Naismith Award and set a Big East record by making 93.4 percent of his FTs in league games. El-Amin scored a collegiate career-high 34 points in a 75–70 loss to the University of Notre Dame on January 5, 2000, which ended the UConn Huskies' 10-game winning streak.

He left UConn as fourth all-time at the school in FT percentage at 82.2, sixth all-time in assists and fifth in steals. His averages per game in his final season are 31.9 minutes, 16.0 points, 3.1 rebounds, 5.2 assists, 2.7 turnovers, 1.7 steals, makes 2.9 of 5.5 field goals (41.1%) and 4.1 of 4.6 free throws (89.2%). He finished his college career with averages of 30.1 minutes, 15.3 points on 41.6% shooting and 82.2% free throws, 3.0 rebounds, 4.4 assists, 2.7 turnovers and 1.7 steals.

El-Amin also helped the U.S. to a gold medal performance in the '98 Goodwill Games in New York City.

== NBA career ==
El-Amin was drafted by the Chicago Bulls in the 2nd round with the 5th pick (34th overall) of the 2000 NBA draft. That year, he played in the Schick Rookie Challenge at All-Star weekend in Washington, DC and scored 18 points. El-Amin only played 1 season in the NBA, playing 50 games (14 starts) and had a per-game average of 6.3 points, 2.9 assists, 1.6 rebounds, 1 steal, and 1.1 turnovers. His final NBA game was played on February 26, 2001, in a 78 - 84 loss to the Golden State Warriors where he played for 13 minutes and recorded 2 assists.

On March 20, 2001 El-Amin was waived from the Chicago Bulls.

== European career ==
El-Amin signed with Strasbourg (France) in January 2002. He then joined Maccabi Ironi Ramat Gan (Israel) in November 2002.

He joined Besiktas Istanbul of the Turkish league in August 2003. Dominating the league for two seasons, El-Amin was second in scoring (20.9) and third in assists (5.2) in his first season. In 2005, he led the league in assists and averaged 20.4 points a game. He was named MVP of the Turkish League All-Star Game in 2005 and was a member of the World Team at the 2005 FIBA Europe All-Star Game.

In June 2005, he started his first season with Azovmash Mariupol of the Ukrainian Basketball SuperLeague. Azovmash won the 2006 Ukrainian Championship, and El-Amin was named the MVP of both the regular season and playoffs.

In June 2007, he signed with Türk Telekom B.K. of the Turkish Basketball Super League for the 2007–08 season.

In June 2008, he returned to Azovmash and signed a two-year contract. In March 2009, he returned to Türk Telekom for the remainder of the season. He was named to the All-EuroCup Second Team for the 2008–09 Eurocup season.

In August 2009, he signed with Budivelnyk Kyiv. He left Budivelnyk after one season.

In October 2010, he signed a one-year contract with BC Lietuvos Rytas of the Lithuanian Basketball League and EuroLeague. In March 2011, he suffered a torn quadriceps ending his season and tenure with Lietuvos Rytas.

In December 2011, El-Amin signed a one-month deal with Cibona Zagreb of Croatia. He later extend his contract for the rest of the season, and helped his team to win the Croatian A-1 Liga.

In July 2012, he signed a one-year deal with Le Mans Sarthe Basket of France. He left Le Mans in February 2013, and signed with the Turkish club Trabzonspor. In October 2013, during the Turkish Cup game with Pinar Karsiyaka, he got injured and later missed whole 2013–14 season.

In August 2014, he signed with BG Göttingen of the German Basketball Bundesliga for the 2014–15 season.

On August 11, 2015, he signed with Sigal Prishtina of Kosovo for the 2015–16 season. On December 7, 2016, he left Prishtina and returned to BG Göttingen for the rest of the 2015–16 season. In May 2016, he underwent back surgery. In spring 2017, he had a short stint with the Marinos de Anzoategui of Venezuela.

He joined CBS Sports Network as a college basketball analyst.

After retiring from professional basketball, El-Amin became an assistant coach for the boys' basketball team at Minneapolis North High School.

== Career statistics ==
Legend
GP	Games played	GS	Games started	MPG	Minutes per game
FG%	Field goal percentage	3P%	3-point field goal percentage	FT%	Free throw percentage
RPG	Rebounds per game	APG	Assists per game	SPG	Steals per game
BPG	Blocks per game	PPG	Points per game	**Bold**	Career high

=== NBA ===
==== Regular season ====
Year	Team	GP	GS	MPG	FG%	3P%	FT%	RPG	APG	SPG	BPG	PPG
2000–01	Chicago	50	14	18.7	.370	.333	.778	1.6	2.9	1.0	0.0	6.3
