= 1999–2000 Big East Conference men's basketball season =

American college basketball season

1999–2000 Big East Conference Men's Basketball Season
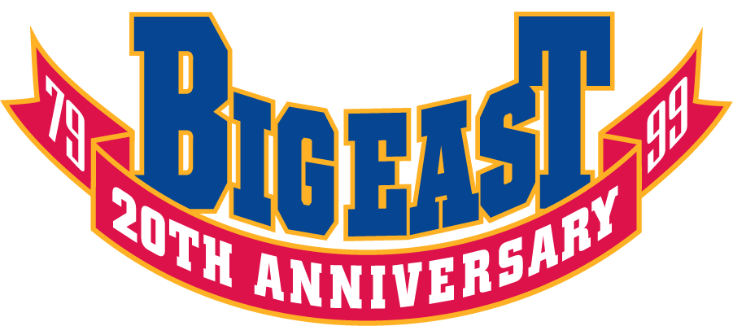
- League: NCAA Division I
- Sport: Basketball
- Duration: November 11, 1999 through March 11, 2000
- Teams: 13
- TV partner: ESPN

Regular Season
- Champion: Miami and Syracuse (13–3)
- Season MVP: Troy Murphy – Notre Dame

Tournament
- Champions: St. John's
- Finals MVP: Bootsy Thornton – St. John's

Basketball seasons
- 1998–99 2000–01

1999–2000 Big East men's basketball standings
	Conf.				Overall
Team	W		L	PCT	W		L	PCT
No. 16 Syracuse	13	–	3	.813	26	–	6	.813
No. 23 Miami (FL)	13	–	3	.813	23	–	11	.676
No. 9 St. John's†	12	–	4	.750	25	–	8	.758
No. 20 Connecticut	10	–	6	.625	25	–	10	.714
Seton Hall	10	–	6	.625	22	–	10	.688
Villanova	8	–	8	.500	20	–	13	.606
Notre Dame	8	–	8	.500	22	–	15	.595
West Virginia	6	–	10	.375	14	–	14	.500
Georgetown	6	–	10	.375	19	–	15	.559
Rutgers	6	–	10	.375	15	–	16	.484
Pittsburgh	5	–	11	.313	13	–	15	.464
Providence	4	–	12	.250	11	–	19	.367
Boston College	3	–	13	.188	11	–	19	.367
† 2000 Big East tournament winner As of April 3, 2000; Rankings from AP poll

The 1999–2000 Big East Conference men's basketball season was the 21st in conference history, and involved its 13 full-time member schools.

Miami and Syracuse were the regular-season co-champions with identical records of 13–3. St. John's won the Big East tournament championship.

== Season summary & highlights ==
- Miami and Syracuse were the regular-season co-champions with identical records of 13–3. It was Miami's first and Syracuse's seventh regular-season championship or co-championship.
- St. John's won its third Big East tournament championship.
- Jim Boeheim of Syracuse received his third Big East Coach of the Year award.

== Head coaches ==
School	Coach	Season	Notes
Boston College	Al Skinner	3rd	
Connecticut	Jim Calhoun	14th	
Georgetown	Craig Esherick	2nd	
Miami	Leonard Hamilton	10th	Resigned June 14, 2000
Notre Dame	Matt Doherty	1st	Resigned July 11, 2000
Pittsburgh	Ben Howland	1st	
Providence	Tim Welsh	2nd	
Rutgers	Kevin Bannon	3rd	
St. John's	Mike Jarvis	2nd	
Seton Hall	Tommy Amaker	3rd	
Syracuse	Jim Boeheim	24th	Big East Coach of the Year (3rd award)
Villanova	Steve Lappas	8th	
West Virginia	Gale Catlett	22nd	

== Rankings ==
Ranked No. 1 in the preseason Associated Press poll, Connecticut remained in the Top 25 all season, finishing at No. 20. Syracuse also was in the Top 25 all season. Miami, St. John's, and Seton Hall also appeared in the Top 25.

1999–2000 Big East Conference Weekly Rankings Key: ██ Increase in ranking. ██ Decrease in ranking.
AP Poll	Pre	11/15	11/22	11/29	12/6	12/13	12/20	12/27	1/3	1/10	1/17	1/24	1/31	2/7	2/14	2/21	2/28	3/6	Final
Boston College																			
Connecticut	1	8	7	5	6	3	2	2	2	5	8	6	7	13	18	22	24	21	20
Georgetown																			
Miami	25																	23	23
Notre Dame																			
Pittsburgh																			
Providence																			
Rutgers																			
St. John's	18	15									19	25					18	19	9
Seton Hall															23				
Syracuse	17	13	14	14	12	10	9	7	7	7	6	4	4	4	9	13	9	12	16
Villanova																			
West Virginia																			

== Regular-season statistical leaders ==
Scoring
Name	School	PPG
Troy Murphy	ND	22.7
Troy Bell	BC	18.8
Ricardo Greer	Pitt	18.8
Johnny Hemsley	Mia	18.1
Erick Barkley	SJU	16.0

Rebounding
Name	School	RPG
Troy Murphy	ND	10.3
Ricardo Greer	Pitt	9.8
Etan Thomas	Syr	9.3
Marcus Goree	WVU	8.2
Erron Maxey	Prov	8.0

Assists
Name	School	APG
Vernon Jennings	Mia	6.8
Jason Hart	Syr	6.5
Jimmy Dillon	ND	5.8
Shaheen Holloway	SHU	5.6
Brandin Knight	Pitt	5.5

Steals
Name	School	SPG
Erick Barkley	SJU	3.0
Brandin Knight	Pitt	2.8
Kevin Braswell	GU	2.6
Bootsy Thornton	SJU	2.4
Vernon Jennings	Mia	2.3

Blocks
Name	School	BPG
Etan Thomas	Syr	3.7
Samuel Dalembert	SHU	3.6
Ruben Boumtje-Boumtje	GU	2.5
Marcus Goree	WVU	2.5
Malik Allen	Vill	1.9

Field Goals
Name	School	FG%
Etan Thomas	Syr	.602
Marcus Goree	WVU	.532
Malik Allen	Vill	.511
Troy Murphy	ND	.492
Bootsy Thornton	SJU	.486

3-Pt Field Goals
Name	School	3FG%
Darius Lane	SHU	.358
(no other qualifiers)

Free Throws
Name	School	FT%
Troy Bell	BC	.894
Khalid El-Amin	Conn	.892
Rimas Kaukenas	SJU	.882
Johnny Hemsley	Mia	.849
Lavor Postell	SJU	.809

== Postseason ==
=== Big East tournament ===
==== Seeding ====
Seeding in the Big East tournament was based on conference record, with tiebreakers applied as necessary. Teams seeded fourth through thirteenth played a first-round game, and the other three teams received a bye into the second round.

The tournament's seeding was as follows: (1) Syracuse, (2) Miami, (3) St. John's, (4) Connecticut, (5) Seton Hall, (6) Villanova, (7) Notre Dame, (8) West Virginia, (9) Georgetown, (10) Rutgers, (11) Pittsburgh, (12) Providence, (13) Boston College.

==== Bracket ====
First round March 8, 2000
8	West Virginia	67
9	Georgetown	70
5	Seton Hall	85
12	Providence	65
4	#21 Connecticut	70
13	Boston College	55
6	Villanova	65
11	Pittsburgh	55
7	Notre Dame	74
10	Rutgers	62

Quarterfinals; March 9, 2000
1	#12 Syracuse	72
9	Georgetown	76
5	Seton Hall	64
4	#21 Connecticut	79
3	#19 St. John's	75
6	Villanova	70
2	#23 Miami	61
7	Notre Dame	58

Semifinals; March 10, 2000
9	Georgetown	55
4	#21 Connecticut	70
3	#19 St. John's	58
2	#23 Miami	57

Championship Game; March 11, 2000
4	#21 Connecticut	70
3	#19 St. John's	80

=== NCAA tournament ===
Five Big East teams received bids to the NCAA Tournament. Connecticut and St. John's lost in the second round and Miami, Seton Hall, and Syracuse in the regional semifinals.

Ohio State, which Miami defeated in the second round, vacated 16 games, including all NCAA Tournament wins from the 1999–2000 season, due to the Jim O’Brien scandal.

School	Region	Seed	Round 1	Round 2	Sweet 16
Syracuse	Midwest	4	13 Samford, W 79–66	5 Kentucky, W 52–50	1 Michigan State, L 75–58
Miami	South	6	11 Arkansas, W 75–71	3 ~~Ohio State~~, W 75–62	7 Tulsa, L 80–71
Seton Hall	East	10	7 Oregon, W 72–71^{(OT)}	2 Temple, W 67–65^{(OT)}	3 Oklahoma State, L 68–66
St. John's	West	2	15 Northern Arizona, W 61–56	10 Gonzaga, L 82–76	
Connecticut	South	5	12 Utah State, W 75–67	4 Tennessee, L 65–51	

=== National Invitation Tournament ===
Four Big East teams received bids to the National Invitation Tournament, which did not yet have seeding. They played in three of the tournament's four unnamed brackets. Kent State knocked both Rutgers and Villanova out of the tournament, Rutgers in the first round and Villanova in the second. Georgetown also lost in the second round, but Notre Dame reached the championship game, losing to Wake Forest and finishing as the tournament's runner-up.

Georgetown's grueling three-and-a-half-hour, triple-overtime defeat of Virginia in the first round on March 15, 2000, is considered one of the greatest games in both NIT and Georgetown history. The game broke a number of Georgetown scoring records, and Georgetown's and Virginia's combined 226 points set a record for total points scored in an NIT game, breaking the previous record of 213 set by Connecticut and Saint Louis in the 1955 NIT.

School	Round 1	Round 2	Quarterfinals	Semifinals	Final
Notre Dame	Michigan, W 75–65	Xavier, W 76–64	BYU, W 64–52	Penn State, W 73–52	Wake Forest, L 71–61
Georgetown	Virginia, W 115–111^{3OT}	California, L 60–49			
Villanova	Delaware, W 72–63	Kent State, L 81–67			
Rutgers	Kent State, L 73–62				

== Awards and honors ==
=== Big East Conference ===
Player of the Year:

- Troy Murphy, Notre Dame, F, So.

Defensive Player of the Year:

- Etan Thomas, Syracuse, C, Sr.

Rookie of the Year:

- Troy Bell, Boston College, G, Fr.

Co-Most Improved Players:

- Ricardo Greer, Pittsburgh, F, Jr.
- Shaheen Holloway, Seton Hall, G, Sr.

Coach of the Year:

- Jim Boeheim, Syracuse (24th season)

All-Big East First Team

- Khalid El-Amin, Connecticut, G, Jr., 5 ft 10 in (178 cm), 200 lb (91 kg), Minneapolis, Minn.
- Troy Murphy, Notre Dame, F, So., 6 ft 11 in (211 cm), 245 lb (111 kg), Morristown, N.J.
- Erick Barkley, St. John's, G, So., 6 ft 1 in (185 cm), 177 lb (80 kg), Queens, N.Y.
- Etan Thomas, St. John's, G, Sr., 6 ft 10 in (208 cm), 260 lb (118 kg), New York, N.Y.
- Jason Hart, Syracuse, G, Sr., 6 ft 3 in (191 cm), 180 lb (82 kg), Los Angeles, Calif.

All-Big East Second Team:

- Johnny Hemsley, Miami, G, Sr., 6 ft 5 in (196 cm), 195 lb (88 kg), Baltimore, Md.
- Ricardo Greer, Pittsburgh, F, Jr., 6 ft 5 in (196 cm), 200 lb (91 kg), New York, N.Y.
- Shaheen Holloway, Seton Hall, G, Sr., 5 ft 10 in (178 cm), 173 lb (78 kg), Queens, N.Y.
- Lavor Postell, St. John's, F, Sr., 6 ft 6 in (198 cm), 215 lb (98 kg), Albany, Ga.
- Malik Allen, Villanova, C, Sr., 6 ft 10 in (208 cm), 255 lb (116 kg), Willingboro Township, N.J.

All-Big East Third Team:

- Ruben Boumtje-Boumtje, Georgetown, C, Jr., 7 ft 0 in (213 cm), 257 lb (117 kg), Edéa, Cameroon
- Mario Bland, Miami, C, Sr., 6 ft 6 in (198 cm), 265 lb (120 kg), Jackson, Miss.
- Bootsy Thornton, St. John's, G, Sr., 6 ft 4 in (193 cm), 195 lb (88 kg), Baltimore, Md.
- Ryan Blackwell, Syracuse, F, Sr., 6 ft 7 in (201 cm), 243 lb (110 kg), Champagne, Ill.
- Marcus Goree, West Virginia, F, Sr., 6 ft 9 in (206 cm), 255 lb (116 kg), Dallas, Tex.

Big East All-Rookie Team:

- Troy Bell, Boston College, G, Fr., 6 ft 1 in (185 cm), 180 lb (82 kg), Minneapolis, Minn.
- Darius Lane, Seton Hall, G, Fr., 6 ft 4 in (193 cm), 208 lb (94 kg), Fridley, Minn.
- Samuel Dalembert, Seton Hall, C, Fr., 6 ft 11 in (211 cm), 250 lb (113 kg), Port-au-Prince, Haiti
- Anthony Glover, St. John's, F, Fr., 6 ft 6 in (198 cm), 231 lb (105 kg), The Bronx, N.Y.
- Gary Buchanan, Villanova, G, Fr., 6 ft 4 in (193 cm), 205 lb (93 kg), St. Louis, Mo.

=== All-Americans ===
The following players were selected to the 2000 Associated Press All-America teams.

Consensus All-America First Team:

- Troy Murphy, Notre Dame, Key Stats: 22.7 ppg, 10.3 rpg, 1.6 apg, 1.4 spg, 1.0 bpg, 49.2 FG%, 32.6 3P%, 839 points

First Team All-America:

- Troy Murphy, Notre Dame, Key Stats: 22.7 ppg, 10.3 rpg, 1.6 apg, 1.4 spg, 1.0 bpg, 49.2 FG%, 32.6 3P%, 839 points

AP Honorable Mention

- Erick Barkley, St. John's
- Khalid El-Amin, Connecticut
- Etan Thomas, Syracuse

== See also ==
- 1999–2000 NCAA Division I men's basketball season
- 1999–2000 Connecticut Huskies men's basketball team
- 1999–2000 Georgetown Hoyas men's basketball team
- 1999–2000 Miami Hurricanes men's basketball team
- 1999–2000 Notre Dame Fighting Irish men's basketball team
- 1999–2000 Pittsburgh Panthers men's basketball team
- 1999–2000 Seton Hall Pirates men's basketball team
- 1999–2000 St. John's Red Storm men's basketball team
- 1999–2000 Syracuse Orangemen basketball team
