= Pittsburgh Panthers men's basketball statistical leaders =

The Pittsburgh Panthers men's basketball statistical leaders are individual statistical leaders of the Pittsburgh Panthers men's basketball program in various categories, including points, assists, blocks, rebounds, and steals. Within those areas, the lists identify single-game, single-season, and career leaders. The Panthers represent the University of Pittsburgh in the NCAA's Atlantic Coast Conference.

Pittsburgh began competing in intercollegiate basketball in 1905. However, the school's record book does not generally list records from before the 1950s, as records from before this period are often incomplete and inconsistent. Since scoring was much lower in this era, and teams played much fewer games during a typical season, it is likely that few or no players from this era would appear on these lists anyway.

The NCAA did not officially record assists as a stat until the 1983–84 season, and blocks and steals until the 1985–86 season, but Pittsburgh's record books includes players in these stats before these seasons. These lists are updated through the end of the 2023–24 season.

== Scoring ==
Career
Rk	Player	Points	Seasons
1	Charles Smith	2,045	1984–85 1985–86 1986–87 1987–88
2	Clyde Vaughan	2,033	1980–81 1981–82 1982–83 1983–84
3	Larry Harris	1,914	1974–75 1975–76 1976–77 1977–78
4	Sam Young	1,884	2005–06 2006–07 2007–08 2008–09
5	Don Hennon	1,841	1956–57 1957–58 1958–59
6	Jason Matthews	1,840	1987–88 1988–89 1989–90 1990–91
7	Michael Young	1,835	2013–14 2014–15 2015–16 2016–17
8	Ricardo Greer	1,753	1997–98 1998–99 1999–00 2000–01
9	Ashton Gibbs	1,748	2008–09 2009–10 2010–11 2011–12
10	Billy Knight	1,731	1971–72 1972–73 1973–74

Season
Rk	Player	Points	Season
1	Sam Young	690	2008–09
2	Sam Young	668	2007–08
3	Clyde Vaughan	651	1983–84
	Don Hennon	651	1957–58
5	Michael Young	648	2016–17
6	Ed Pavlick	622	1954–55
7	Larry Harris	617	1976–77
	Don Hennon	617	1958–59
	Billy Knight	617	1972–73
10	Lamar Patterson	616	2013–14

Single game
Rk	Player	Points	Season	Opponent
1	Don Hennon	45	1957–58	Duke
2	Jamel Artis	43	2016–17	Louisville
3	Don Hennon	41	1958–59	Ohio State
	Don Hennon	41	1957–58	Geneva
	Blake Hinson	41	2023–24	Louisville
6	Ed Pavlick	40	1954–55	Ohio State
	Jason Maile	40	1996–97	Villanova
8	Larry Harris	39	1975–76	Syracuse
	Larry Harris	39	1976–77	Maryland
10	Don Hennon	38	1957–58	Furman
	Don Hennon	38	1956–57	West Virginia

== Rebounds ==
Career
Rk	Player	Rebounds	Seasons
1	Sam Clancy	1,342	1977–78 1978–79 1979–80 1980–81
2	Charles Smith	987	1984–85 1985–86 1986–87 1987–88
3	Jerome Lane	970	1985–86 1986–87 1987–88
4	Billy Knight	938	1971–72 1972–73 1973–74
5	Clyde Vaughan	922	1980–81 1981–82 1982–83 1983–84
6	Ricardo Greer	888	1997–98 1998–99 1999–00 2000–01
7	Michael Young	847	2013–14 2014–15 2015–16 2016–17
8	Bob Lazor	841	1954–55 1955–56 1956–57
9	Isaac Hawkins	834	1996–97 1997–98 1998–99 2000–01
10	Talib Zanna	808	2009–10 2010–11 2011–12 2012–13 2013–14

Season
Rk	Player	Rebounds	Season
1	Jerome Lane	444	1986–87
2	DeJuan Blair	432	2008–09
3	Don Virostek	424	1952–53
4	Jerome Lane	378	1987–88
5	Billy Knight	375	1973–74
6	Sam Clancy	362	1978–79
7	Aaron Gray	345	2005–06
8	Aaron Gray	341	2006–07
9	DeJuan Blair	337	2007–08
10	Sam Clancy	332	1980–81

Single game
Rk	Player	Rebounds	Season	Opponent
1	Don Virostek	26	1952–53	Westminster
2	John Fridley	24	1960–61	Carnegie Tech
3	DeJuan Blair	23	2008–09	Connecticut
	Bob Lazor	23	1954–55	Penn State
5	DeJuan Blair	22	2008–09	Notre Dame
	Ed Pavlick	22	1953–54	Georgetown
7	9 times by 7 players	21	Most recent: Baye Ndongo, 2026–27 vs. Buffalo	

== Assists ==
Career
Rk	Player	Assists	Seasons
1	Brandin Knight	785	1999–00 2000–01 2001–02 2002–03
2	Sean Miller	744	1987–88 1988–89 1990–91 1991–92
3	Levance Fields	645	2005–06 2006–07 2007–08 2008–09
4	Darelle Porter	617	1987–88 1988–89 1989–90 1990–91
5	James Robinson	604	2012–13 2013–14 2014–15 2015–16
6	Tray Woodall	580	2008–09 2009–10 2010–11 2011–12 2012–13
7	Carl Krauser	568	2002–03 2003–04 2004–05 2005–06
8	Jerry McCullough	552	1991–92 1992–93 1993–94 1995–96
9	Vonteego Cummings	458	1995–96 1996–97 1997–98 1998–99
10	Brad Wanamaker	454	2007–08 2008–09 2009–10 2010–11

Season
Rk	Player	Assists	Season
1	Levance Fields	270	2008–09
2	Brandin Knight	251	2001–02
3	Darelle Porter	229	1989–90
4	Sean Miller	224	1991–92
5	Brandin Knight	209	2002–03
6	Dwayne Wallace	187	1981–82
7	Sean Miller	181	1988–89
8	Sean Miller	180	1987–88
	Keith Starr	180	1974–75
10	Jerry McCullough	175	1993–94

Single game
Rk	Player	Assists	Season	Opponent
1	Levance Fields	16	2008–09	DePaul
	Bob Shrewsbury	16	1975–76	South Carolina
3	Carl Krauser	15	2004–05	West Virginia
4	Brandin Knight	14	2001–02	Miami [Fla.]
	Brandin Knight	14	2001–02	West Virginia
	Darelle Porter	14	1989–90	Syracuse
7	15 times by 11 players	13	Most recent: Naithan George, 2026–27 vs. Villanova	

== Steals ==
Career
Rk	Player	Steals	Seasons
1	Brandin Knight	298	1999–00 2000–01 2001–02 2002–03
2	Jerry McCullough	257	1991–92 1992–93 1993–94 1995–96
3	Vonteego Cummings	235	1995–96 1996–97 1997–98 1998–99
4	Kellii Taylor	202	1995–96 1996–97 1997–98 1998–99 1999–2000
5	Ricardo Greer	196	1997–98 1998–99 1999–00 2000–01
6	Carlton Neverson	194	1978–79 1979–80 1980–81
7	Jaron Brown	192	2000–01 2001–02 2002–03 2003–04
8	Carl Krauser	190	2002–03 2003–04 2004–05 2005–06
9	Darelle Porter	170	1987–88 1988–89 1989–90 1990–91
10	Dwayne Wallace	169	1978–79 1979–80 1980–81 1981–82

Season
Rk	Player	Steals	Season
1	Kellii Taylor	101	1996–97
2	Vonteego Cummings	85	1996–97
3	Carlton Neverson	83	1980–81
4	Brandin Knight	82	2001–02
5	Carlton Neverson	78	1979–80
6	Brandin Knight	77	1999–00
7	Lennie McMillian	76	1980–81
	Jerry McCullough	76	1995–96
9	Dwayne Wallace	73	1981–82
10	Brandin Knight	70	2002–03
	Jerry McCullough	70	1993–94
	Sam Clancy	70	1980–81

Single game
Rk	Player	Steals	Season	Opponent
1	George Allen	8	1983–84	Lafayette
2	Trey McGowens	7	2018–19	West Virginia
	Jaron Brown	7	2003–04	Connecticut
	Brandin Knight	7	1999–00	Notre Dame
	Ricardo Greer	7	1999–00	Notre Dame
	Brandin Knight	7	1999–00	Nebraska
	Kellii Taylor	7	1996–97	Navy
	Kellii Taylor	7	1996–97	New Orleans
	Curtis Aiken	7	1984–85	Syracuse
	Chip Watkins	7	1983–84	LaSalle
	George Allen	7	1982–83	Robert Morris
	Carlton Neverson	7	1980–81	St. Francis [Pa.]

== Blocks ==
Career
Rk	Player	Blocks	Seasons
1	Charles Smith	346	1984–85 1985–86 1986–87 1987–88
2	Eric Mobley	184	1991–92 1992–93 1993–94
3	Terrell Brown	173	2017–18 2018–19 2019–20 2020–21
4	Sam Clancy	170	1977–78 1978–79 1979–80 1980–81
5	Isaac Hawkins	143	1996–97 1997–98 1998–99 2000–01
6	Aaron Gray	130	2003–04 2004–05 2005–06 2006–07
7	Gary McGhee	114	2007–08 2008–09 2009–10 2010–11
8	Chris Taft	110	2003–04 2004–05
9	Sam Young	109	2005–06 2006–07 2007–08 2008–09
	Bobby Martin	109	1987–88 1988–89 1989–90 1990–91

Season
Rk	Player	Blocks	Season
1	Charles Smith	106	1986–87
2	Charles Smith	96	1987–88
3	Charles Smith	81	1985–86
4	Mark Blount	78	1996–97
5	Eric Mobley	75	1993–94
6	Jaime Peterson	70	1994–95
	Mel Bennett	70	1974–75
8	Mouhamadou Gueye	67	2021–22
9	Steven Adams	65	2012–13
10	Charles Smith	63	1984–85

Single game
Rk	Player	Blocks	Season	Opponent
1	Terrell Brown	9	2018–19	Colgate
2	Mouhamadou Gueye	8	2021–22	Florida State
3	15 times by 8 players	7	Most recent: Gary McGhee, 2010–11 vs. Duquesne	
