= Curtis Aiken =

American basketball player and analyst

Personal information
- Born: c. 1964/65
- Listed height: 5 ft 11 in (1.80 m)

Career information
- High school: Bennett (Buffalo, New York)
- College: Pittsburgh (1983–1987)
- NBA draft: 1987: undrafted
- Position: Point guard / shooting guard
- Number: 14

Career highlights
- Fourth-team Parade All-American (1983)

Curtis Aiken Sr. is an American former college basketball player who is a radio analyst for Pitt Panthers men's basketball team. He was a two-time captain at Pitt who scored 1,200 points for the team and held the school single-season field goal percentage record from 1986 to 1989.

Prior to college, Aiken played for Bennett High School and formerly held the New York State Public High School Athletic Association (NYSPHSAA) single-season scoring record, the Buffalo Public Schools (BPS) and Western New York career scoring record (disputed), (Note: Various sources note that Aiken established the Buffalo and Western New York career scoring records. However, Aiken's career total is not listed by the NYSPHSAA.) as well as the BPS and Erie County, New York public school single-game scoring record.

== High school ==
As a youth, Curtis Aiken was a regular attendee at the Masten Boys & Girls Clubs of America in Buffalo. He was raised by his grandmother Marion on the East Side and wanted to be a boxer until attending a basketball camp at the Boys & Girls club at age 10.

In the 1982 Empire State Games scholastic (17 & under) division, Aiken led the West New York team to the gold medal with a 115–109 overtime victory over New York City. In the final game, when Pearl Washington established a scholastic division single-game scoring record 45 points for New York City, Aiken led the West with 43 points. This was the first time the West had ever won basketball gold in the scholastic division of this competition.

On February 8, 1983, Aiken broke Ray Hall's BPS all-time career scoring record (1,794) with a 37-point performance for Bennett High School against Buffalo Academy for Visual and Performing Arts that brought his total to 1,809. Aiken's 1982–1983 single-season total of 924 was a NYSPHSAA record that brought his career total to 2,162 (disputed). Five years later, Christian Laettner became the second Western New York high school player to achieve 2,000 career points (2,066). On February 17, 1989 David Edwards eclipsed Aiken's single-season record with a total of 947 (disputed) (Note: Various sources note that Edwards surpassed Aikens' single-season scoring record. However, Edwards' single-season total is not listed by the NYSPHSAA.) in a playoff loss (his 23rd game) before Marcus Whitfield reached 958 in his 21st game, a playoff win for Burgard Vocational High School on February 18 hosted at Amherst Central High School. The 45-point performance also eclipsed Aiken's BPS career total moving the record to 2,189. Bennett won the 1983 Class B NYSPHSAA State Championships at the Glens Falls Civic Center over John S. Burke Catholic High School 88-61. It was the second time a school from Western New York had won a public school state championship. That year Aiken was named Western New York boys' basketball player of the year by The Buffalo News. He also repeated as a first team All-Western New York selection. That year he was All-class co-New York State Player of the Year (with Russell Pierre) by the New York State Sportswriters Association.

Despite the numbers in the press, the NYSPHSAA record book does not include Aiken among those with at least 2,041 career points (lowest total among career points leaders) and it does not list Edwards among those with at least 910 points in a season. It does include Aiken's 65-point senior season performance, which seems to have been fifth highest in state history at the time. The 65-point performance was listed below the 1968–69 70-point performance by Don Hurlburt of Hinsdale Central School, meaning it was a BPS and an Erie County public school record, which stood until Robert Robinson totaled 67 five seasons later for Emerson Vocational High School, but not a Western New York public school record at the time.

Aiken was a fourth-team Parade All-American in 1983. Aiken scored 13 points in the 10th annual April 1, 1983 McDonald's Capital Classic at the Capital Centre, not to be confused with the 6th annual April 9, 1983 McDonald's All-American Boys Game at the Omni Coliseum. (Note: Some sources state that Aiken was a 1983 McDonald's All-American, but he was not listed on either a roster announcement nor McDonald's alumni list (which includes players who were recognized by McDonald's as All Americans but did not participate in the game).) In the Capital Classic, Aiken played for the McDonald-sponsored U.S. All-Stars team that included James Blackmon Sr., Keith Gatlin, Joe Wolf, Barry Sumpter, Mike Smith, Corey Gaines, Daryl Thomas, Greg Koubek, and Winston Bennett. In the 1983 National Sports Festival (later called the U.S. Olympic Festival) he was on the East team, which included Washington, Walter Berry, Kenny Smith, and Dallas Comegys that beat the south team led by Kenny Green on June 28. In the 3rd Annual Pearl Street College Senior Basketball All-Star Game in Waterbury, Connecticut Muggsy Bogues (31 points) and Vince Johnson (34 points) were co-MVPs for the winning West team. Aiken posted 50 points for the East. He was also selected for the Dapper Dan Club's annual all-star basketball game along with guards Bogues, Washington, Antoine Joubert and Steve Alford for the U.S. Team.

In 2009 as The Buffalo News celebrated 50 years of All-Western New York (WNY) basketball selections, Aiken, who was twice an All-WNY first team selection was named to the 1980s All-WNY first team along with Christian Laettner, Gary Bossert, Keith Robinson and Ritchie Campbell He was a first team selection for the All-time All-WNY team along with Laettner, Paul Harris, Bob Lanier and Mel Montgomery.

=== Recruiting ===
On March 4, 1983, Aiken chose Kansas over his other finalists Michigan State, Syracuse and West Virginia, citing the teaching skills of assistant coach Jo Jo White as his primary reason. On March 21, Kansas fired head coach Ted Owens after 19 seasons. There was speculation that White might replace Owens. On April 7, Kansas hired Larry Brown, which caused Aiken to reopen his recruiting. According to The New York Times, Brown made an unsuccessful at-home visit with his top assistants before the April 13 signing day when he signed his National Letter of Intent with Pitt. On April 13, Kansas announced they would retain White and Bob Hill. According to The Oklahoman, Aiken had demanded that White be retained as an assistant, but there was no announcement of his retention within 5 days of Brown's hiring. When Kansas announced they would rehire White, it was too late. White was later fired for philosophical differences and did not end up serving as an assistant coach for the 1983–84 Kansas Jayhawks. Although Roy Chipman was the Pitt head coach, his assistants Seth Greenberg (1980–83) and John Calipari (1985-1988) were said to deserve the credit for recruiting successes of that era, including Aiken.

== College ==
Aiken scored 1,200 career points and served as two-time captain of Pitt (1985–86, 1986–87).

When Aiken arrived at Pitt much was expected. He was a 1983–84 Big East preseason All-rookie first team selection along with unanimous selections Washington and Reggie Williams as well as Michael Graham and Willie Glass. The second team included Mark Jackson and Harold Jensen among others. Aiken was compared to Don Hennon as an exciting short Pitt Panther. The 1983–84 Panthers only won one of its first 8 conference games.

Aiken led the 1984–85 team in assists (4.2) and steals (1.6). For the 1985–86 season he led the team in field goal percentage with 56.9 percent. This percentage was a single-season school record (minimum 5 FGA/Game) that stood for three years until Brian Shorter had 60 percent for the 1988–89 team. Aiken earned the first of two career in-season tournament MVPs for that team in December 1985. He was MVP of the Sugar Bowl Classic Tournament in New Orleans when the team defeated Texas A&M and Louisiana–Lafayette. He was joined on the tournament team by Charles Smith. On January 3, Aiken was switched to his natural position of shooting guard.

In the 1986 Empire State games open division, Aikens' West team settled for the silver against New York City after losing 97–94 despite 31 points from Aiken who scored 12 of the West's final 14 points. New York City was led by 15 points and 9 assists by Jackson and 20 points by Derrick Chievous.

For the 1986–87 NCAA Division I men's basketball season, the three-point field goal was introduced. All Big East coaches thought of the experiment as lunacy, although players like Jackson and Billy Donovan were for the idea. As a senior for the 1986–87 team, Aiken led Pitt in three-point shot percentage (39.3 percent). He earned MVP of the December 1986 Rainbow Classic Tournament in Honolulu. He led the team to victories over Kansas, Arkansas, and Wisconsin and was joined on the tournament team by Jerome Lane, and Smith. Aiken had his career high 37 points against Arkansas on December 29. He earned Big East Player of the Week on January 4, 1987 for this effort. For the season, Pitt earned its first Big East regular season championship.

== Career ==
Aiken worked for Coca-Cola after college until at least 2002. He also had several business ventures. Aiken joined Dick Groat as a second color commentator on Pitt Panther broadcast in 2010. When Groat became unable to attend road games in 2017 Aiken became the sole color commentator for road games. The 2022-23 Pitt Basketball Media Guide credits the 2022–23 Pittsburgh Panthers season as his 13th alongside Bill Hillgrove as the color analyst for Pitt basketball on their broadcast radio network affiliates and on SiriusXM satellite radio. Groat's contract was not renewed in 2019. When Aiken first signed on in 2010, he was just a contributing color commentator for home games. Before his time as a color analyst on the Pitt Panther broadcast network with Hillgrove, Aiken had served as a color commentator for announcer Jeff Hathhorn on Pitt's non-conference games airing on ACC Network Extra, an online platform through ESPN.

In 2002, he was inducted into the Bennett High School Hall of Fame alongside Bob Lanier in the inaugural class. Aiken was induction into The Greater Buffalo Sports Hall of Fame in 2011.

Aiken was selected to the 2006 Pitt Panthers 15-man all-centennial team. Aiken was the third selection (behind Bob Lanier and Laettner) to the 2009 50th anniversary All-Western New York boys first team by The Buffalo News for his high school career.

== See also ==
- Pittsburgh Panthers men's basketball statistical leaders
