= 1999–2000 St. John's Red Storm men's basketball team =

American college basketball season

1999–2000 St. John's Red Storm men's basketball

Big East tournament Champions

NCAA tournament, second round
- Conference: Big East Conference

Ranking
- Coaches: No. 18
- AP: No. 9
- Record: 25–8 (12–4 Big East)
- Head coach: Mike Jarvis (2nd year)
- Assistant coaches: Kevin Clark; Mike Jarvis II; Dermon Player
- Home arena: Alumni Hall; Madison Square Garden

1999–2000 Big East men's basketball standings
	Conf.				Overall
Team	W		L	PCT	W		L	PCT
No. 16 Syracuse	13	–	3	.813	26	–	6	.813
No. 23 Miami (FL)	13	–	3	.813	23	–	11	.676
No. 9 St. John's†	12	–	4	.750	25	–	8	.758
No. 20 Connecticut	10	–	6	.625	25	–	10	.714
Seton Hall	10	–	6	.625	22	–	10	.688
Villanova	8	–	8	.500	20	–	13	.606
Notre Dame	8	–	8	.500	22	–	15	.595
West Virginia	6	–	10	.375	14	–	14	.500
Georgetown	6	–	10	.375	19	–	15	.559
Rutgers	6	–	10	.375	15	–	16	.484
Pittsburgh	5	–	11	.313	13	–	15	.464
Providence	4	–	12	.250	11	–	19	.367
Boston College	3	–	13	.188	11	–	19	.367
† 2000 Big East tournament winner As of April 3, 2000; Rankings from AP poll

The 1999–2000 St. John's Red Storm men's basketball team represented St. John's University during the 1999–2000 NCAA Division I men's basketball season. The team was coached by Mike Jarvis in his second year at the school. St. John's home games are played at Alumni Hall and Madison Square Garden and the team is a member of the Big East Conference.

== Off season ==
=== Departures ===
Name	Number	Pos.	Height	Year	Hometown	Notes
Collin Charles	11	G	5'11"	Junior	Toronto, Ontario	Transferred to Quinnipiac
Ron Artest	15	F	6'6"	Sophomore	Queens, New York	Entered 1999 NBA draft
Tyrone Grant	32	F	6'7"	Senior	Brooklyn, New York	Graduated
Albert Richardson	55	F/C	6'9"	Junior	New Orleans, Louisiana	Out of Div. 1 eligibility. Transferred to Kentucky Wesleyan

=== Transfer addition ===
Name	Number	Pos.	Height	Year	Hometown	Notes
Alpha Bangura	15	G	6'6"	Sophomore	Lanham, Maryland	Transfer from Monmouth (3 yrs eligibility remaining)

=== Class of 1999 signees ===
College recruiting information
Name	Hometown	School	Height	Weight	Commit date
Heath Orvis; PG	Longmont, CO	Longmont High School	6 ft 0 in (1.83 m)	N/A	
Heath Orvis; PG	Recruit ratings: No ratings found				
Jack Wolfinger; PF	Portland, OR	Joel Barlow High School	6 ft 11 in (2.11 m)	N/A	
Jack Wolfinger; PF	Recruit ratings: No ratings found				
Abe Keita; C	Tolland, CT	Winchendon School	6 ft 9 in (2.06 m)	N/A	
Abe Keita; C	Recruit ratings: No ratings found				
Overall recruit ranking:
Note: In many cases, Scout, Rivals, 247Sports, On3, and ESPN may conflict in their listings of height and weight.; In these cases, the average was taken. ESPN grades are on a 100-point scale.; Sources: "1999 Team Ranking". Rivals.

== Roster ==
1999–2000 St. John's Red Storm men's basketball team
Players
Coaches

Pos.	#	Name	Height	Weight	Year	Previous school	Hometown
G	3	Chudney Gray	6 ft 3 in (1.91 m)	—	Sr	Rice	Bronx, NY
C	4	Abe Keita (I)	6 ft 9 in (2.06 m)	—	Fr	Winchendon	Tolland, CT
G	10	Kareem Syed (W)	6 ft 5 in (1.96 m)	—	Sr	Hillcrest	Queens, NY
G	11	John Scheiman (W)	6 ft 1 in (1.85 m)	—	Fr	LaGuardia	Manhattan, NY
G	12	Erick Barkley	6 ft 1 in (1.85 m)	—	So	Christ the King/Maine Central	Queens, NY
G	14	Bootsy Thornton	6 ft 4 in (1.93 m)	—	Sr	Tallahassee C.C./Dunbar	Baltimore, MD
G	15	Alpha Bangura (redshirt)	6 ft 6 in (1.98 m)	—	So	Eleanor Roosevelt/Monmouth	Lanham, MD
G	21	Heath Orvis	6 ft 0 in (1.83 m)	—	Fr	Longmont	Longmont, CO
F	22	Anthony Glover	6 ft 6 in (1.98 m)	—	So	Rice	Bronx, NY
F	25	Lavor Postell	6 ft 6 in (1.98 m)	—	Sr	Westover	Albany, GA
F	32	Jack Wolfinger (redshirt)	6 ft 11 in (2.11 m)	—	Fr	Joel Barlow	Portland, OR
F/C	33	Donald Emanuel	6 ft 9 in (2.06 m)	—	So	Jones	Houston, TX
G/F	41	Reggie Jessie	6 ft 7 in (2.01 m)	—	Jr	Bishop Loughlin	Queensbridge, NY
F	55	John Parker (W)	6 ft 6 in (1.98 m)	—	Fr	John Muir	Pasadena, CA

Head coach

- Mike Jarvis (Northeastern)

Assistant coach(es)

- Kevin Clark
- Mike Jarvis II
- Dermon Player

Legend

- (C) Team captain
- (S) Suspended
- (I) Ineligible
- (W) Walk-on
- Injured
- Current redshirt

== Schedule and results ==
Date time, TV	Rank^{#}	Opponent^{#}	Result	Record	Site city, state
Exhibition
11/02/99*		Marathon Basketball	W 98–59		Alumni Hall; Queens, NY
Regular season
11/19/99*	No. 15	vs. Samford; CoSIDA Classic Semifinal	L 60–68	0–1	WisePies Arena; Albuquerque, NM
11/20/99*	No. 15	vs. New Mexico; CoSIDA Classic Consolation	W 70–62	1–1	WisePies Arena; Albuquerque, NM
11/23/99*		at Stony Brook	W 84–43	2–1	Stony Brook Arena; Stony Brook, NY
12/01/99*		Coppin State	W 75–52	3–1	Alumni Hall; Queens, NY
12/04/99*		Virginia	W 85–63	4–1	Madison Square Garden; New York, NY
12/08/99*		St. Francis (N.Y.)	W 88–66	5–1	Alumni Hall; Queens, NY
12/11/99*		at Niagara	W 81–66	6–1	Gallagher Center; Niagara, NY
12/14/99*		at DePaul	L 65–71	6–2	Allstate Arena; Rosemont, IL
12/22/99*		Hofstra	W 98–86	7–2	Alumni Hall; Queens, NY
12/29/99*		Sacred Heart	W 95–66	8–2	Alumni Hall; Queens, NY
01/03/00		Pittsburgh	W 82–58	9–2 (1–0)	Alumni Hall; Queens, NY
01/08/00		at West Virginia	W 86–74	10–2 (2–0)	WVU Coliseum; Morgantown, WV
01/10/00		Georgetown	W 75–66	11–2 (3–0)	Madison Square Garden; New York, NY
01/16/00; CBS		at No. 5 Connecticut	W 82–77	12–2 (4–0)	Gampel Pavilion; Storrs, CT
01/18/00	No. 23	at Seton Hall	L 70–78	12–3 (4–1)	Continental Airlines Arena; East Rutherford, NJ
01/22/00*; CBS	No. 23	No. 13 Ohio State	L 64–65	12–4	Madison Square Garden; New York, NY
01/25/00	No. 25	Rutgers	W 61–57	13–4 (5–1)	Madison Square Garden; New York, NY
01/29/00	No. 25	at Notre Dame	L 60–73	13–5 (5–2)	Joyce Center; Notre Dame, IN
01/31/00		at No. 4 Syracuse	L 57–63	13–6 (5–3)	Carrier Dome; Syracuse, NY
02/05/00		Boston College	W 59–58	14–6 (6–3)	Alumni Hall; Queens, NY
02/08/00		at Providence	W 61–46	15–6 (7–3)	Providence Civic Center; Providence, RI
02/12/00		Villanova	W 78–75	16–6 (8–3)	Madison Square Garden; New York, NY
02/15/00		at Boston College	W 73–69	17–6 (9–3)	Silvio O. Conte Forum; Chestnut Hill, MA
02/19/00		No. 9 Syracuse	W 76–75	18–6 (10–3)	Madison Square Garden; New York, NY
02/21/00		No. 18 Connecticut	W 79–64	19–6 (11–3)	Madison Square Garden; New York, NY
02/26/00*; CBS		at No. 2 Duke	W 83–82	20–6	Cameron Indoor Stadium; Durham, NC
02/29/00	No. 18	No. 23 Seton Hall	W 66–60	21–6 (12–3)	Madison Square Garden; New York, NY
03/05/00; CBS	No. 18	at Miami (FL)	L 70–74 ^{OT}	21–7 (12–4)	Miami Arena; Miami, FL
Big East tournament
03/09/00	No. 19	vs. Villanova; Quarterfinal	W 75–70	22–7	Madison Square Garden; New York, NY
03/10/00	No. 19	vs. No. 23 Miami (FL); Semifinal	W 58–57	23–7	Madison Square Garden; New York, NY
03/11/00; ESPN	No. 19	vs. No. 21 Connecticut; Championship	W 80–70	24–7	Madison Square Garden; New York, NY
NCAA tournament
03/16/02; CBS	(2) No. 9	vs. (15) Northern Arizona; First Round	W 61–56	25–7	McKale Center; Tucson, AZ
03/18/02; CBS	(2) No. 9	vs. (10) Gonzaga; Second Round	L 76–82	25–8	McKale Center; Tucson, AZ
*Non-conference game. ^{#}Rankings from AP Poll. (#) Tournament seedings in parentheses.

== Team players drafted into the NBA ==
Round	Pick	Player	NBA club
1	28	Erick Barkley	Portland Trail Blazers
2	39	Lavor Postell	New York Knicks
