= 2000 Big East men's basketball tournament =

- Classification: Division I
- Season: 1999–00
- Teams: 13
- Site: Madison Square Garden; New York City
- Champions: St. John's (3rd title)
- Winning coach: Mike Jarvis (1st title)
- MVP: Bootsy Thornton (St. John's)

1999–2000 Big East men's basketball standings
	Conf.				Overall
Team	W		L	PCT	W		L	PCT
No. 16 Syracuse	13	–	3	.813	26	–	6	.813
No. 23 Miami (FL)	13	–	3	.813	23	–	11	.676
No. 9 St. John's†	12	–	4	.750	25	–	8	.758
No. 20 Connecticut	10	–	6	.625	25	–	10	.714
Seton Hall	10	–	6	.625	22	–	10	.688
Villanova	8	–	8	.500	20	–	13	.606
Notre Dame	8	–	8	.500	22	–	15	.595
West Virginia	6	–	10	.375	14	–	14	.500
Georgetown	6	–	10	.375	19	–	15	.559
Rutgers	6	–	10	.375	15	–	16	.484
Pittsburgh	5	–	11	.313	13	–	15	.464
Providence	4	–	12	.250	11	–	19	.367
Boston College	3	–	13	.188	11	–	19	.367
† 2000 Big East tournament winner As of April 3, 2000; Rankings from AP poll

The 2000 Big East men's basketball tournament took place at Madison Square Garden in New York City. Its winner received the Big East Conference's automatic bid to the 2000 NCAA tournament. It is a single-elimination tournament with four rounds and the three highest seeds received byes in the first round. All 13 Big East teams were invited to participate. Syracuse finished with the best record in the regular season and was awarded the top seed.

St. John's defeated Connecticut in the final, 80–70 to earn its first Big East tournament championship since 1986, and third overall.

== Bracket ==
First round March 8, 2000
8	West Virginia	67
9	Georgetown	70
5	Seton Hall	85
12	Providence	65
4	#21 Connecticut	70
13	Boston College	55
6	Villanova	65
11	Pittsburgh	55
7	Notre Dame	74
10	Rutgers	62

Quarterfinals; March 9, 2000
1	#12 Syracuse	72
9	Georgetown	76
5	Seton Hall	64
4	#21 Connecticut	79
3	#19 St. John's	75
6	Villanova	70
2	#23 Miami	61
7	Notre Dame	58

Semifinals; March 10, 2000
9	Georgetown	55
4	#21 Connecticut	70
3	#19 St. John's	58
2	#23 Miami	57

Championship Game; March 11, 2000
4	#21 Connecticut	70
3	#19 St. John's	80

== Awards ==
Dave Gavitt Trophy (Most Outstanding Player): Bootsy Thornton, St. John's

All-Tournament Team

- Erick Barkley, St. John's
- Khalid El-Amin, Connecticut
- Albert Mouring, Connecticut
- Lavor Postell, St. John's
- Lee Scruggs, Georgetown
- Bootsy Thornton, St. John's

== Television ==
Network	Play-by-play announcer	Color analyst(s)	Sideline reporter(s)
ESPN2 (Rutgers–Notre Dame, opening round; Notre Dame–Miami (FL), quarterfinals)			

== Local Radio ==
Seed	Teams	Flagship station	Play-by-play announcer	Color analyst(s)
7	Notre Dame	WNDV–AM/WNDV-FM (Notre Dame)	Jack Lorri	Jack Nolan
