= 2000 National Invitation Tournament =

Annual NCAA basketball competition

- Season: 1999–00
- Teams: 32
- Finals site: Madison Square Garden, New York City
- Champions: Wake Forest Demon Deacons (1st title)
- Runner-up: Notre Dame Fighting Irish (4th title game)
- Semifinalists: Penn State Nittany Lions (4th semifinal); NC State Wolfpack (4th semifinal)
- Winning coach: Dave Odom (1st title)
- MVP: Robert O'Kelley (Wake Forest)

The 2000 National Invitation Tournament was the year 2000's staging of the annual National Invitation Tournament, an NCAA college basketball competition.

== Selected teams ==
Below is a list of the 32 teams selected for the tournament.

School	Conference	Record	Appearance	Last bid
Arizona State	Pac-10	18–12	7th	1998
Bowling Green	MAC	22–7	12th	1997
BYU	Mountain West	20–10	8th	1994
California	Pac-10	16–14	5th	1999
Charlotte	C-USA	17–15	4th	1994
Colorado	Big 12	18–13	6th	1999
Delaware	America East	24–7	1st	Never
Georgetown	Big East	18–14	7th	1999
Kent State	MAC	21–7	4th	1990
Long Beach State	Big West	24–5	5th	1992
Marquette	C-USA	15–13	13th	1998
Michigan	Big Ten	15–13	5th	1992
NC State	ACC	17–12	9th	1999
New Mexico	Mountain West	17–13	14th	1992
New Mexico State	Big West	22–9	4th	1995
Notre Dame	Big East	18–14	7th	1997
Ole Miss	SEC	17–13	6th	1989
Penn State	Big Ten	15–15	8th	1998
Princeton	Ivy	19–10	4th	1999
Rutgers	Big East	15–15	11th	1999
Siena	MAAC	23–8	4th	1994
SMU	WAC	21–8	2nd	1986
South Florida	C-USA	17–13	6th	1995
Southern Illinois	Missouri Valley	19–12	8th	1992
Southwest Missouri State	Missouri Valley	22–10	5th	1997
Tulane	C-USA	21–10	6th	1997
UMass	Atlantic 10	17–15	7th	1997
Vanderbilt	SEC	19–10	8th	1998
Villanova	Big East	15–15	13th	1994
Virginia	ACC	19–11	8th	1992
Wake Forest	ACC	17–14	5th	1999
Xavier	Atlantic 10	20–11	7th	1999

== Bracket ==
Below are the four first round brackets, along with the four-team championship bracket.

First Round
(H)	Siena	66
Massachusetts	65
(H)	Penn State	55
Princeton	41
(H)	Kent State	73
Rutgers	62
(H)	Villanova	72
Delaware	63

Second Round
Siena	103
(H)	Penn State	105
Kent State	81
(H)	Villanova	67

Quarterfinals
(H)	Penn State	81
Kent State	74

First Round
(H)	Notre Dame	75
Michigan	65
(H)	Xavier	67
Marquette	63
(H)	BYU	81
Bowling Green	54
Southern Illinois	94
(H)	Colorado	92

Second Round
(H)	Notre Dame	76
Xavier	64
(H)	BYU	82
Southern Illinois	57

Quarterfinals
(H)	Notre Dame	64
BYU	52

First Round
(H)	NC State	64
Tulane	60
(H)	Arizona State	83
New Mexico State	77
(H)	SW Missouri State	77
SMU	64
(H)	Mississippi	62
Charlotte	45

Second Round
(H)	NC State	60
Arizona State	57
SW Missouri State	48
(H)	Mississippi	70

Quarterfinals
NC State	77
(H)	Mississippi	54

First Round
Wake Forest	83
(H)	Vanderbilt	68
(H)	New Mexico	64
South Florida	58
Georgetown	115^{3OT}
(H)	Virginia	111
(H)	California	70
Long Beach State	66

Second Round
(H)	Wake Forest	72
New Mexico	65
(H)	Georgetown	49
California	60

Quarterfinals
(H)	Wake Forest	76
California	59

=== Semifinals & finals ===
Semifinals
Penn State	52
Notre Dame	73
NC State	59
Wake Forest	62

Finals
Notre Dame	61
Wake Forest	71

Third place game
Penn State	74
NC State	72

(H) Home Team

== Local Radio ==
Teams	Flagship station	Play-by-play announcer	Color analyst(s)
Notre Dame	WNDV–AM/WNDV-FM (Notre Dame)	Jack Lorri	Jack Nolan
Wake Forest	WBRF (Wake Forest)	Stan Cotten	Mark Freidinger

== See also ==
- 2000 Women's National Invitation Tournament
- 2000 NCAA Division I men's basketball tournament
- 2000 NCAA Division II men's basketball tournament
- 2000 NCAA Division III men's basketball tournament
- 2000 NCAA Division I women's basketball tournament
- 2000 NAIA Division I men's basketball tournament
- 2000 NAIA Division II men's basketball tournament
