= Ruben Boumtje-Boumtje =

Cameroonian basketball player

Personal information
- Born: 20 May 1978 (age 48) Edéa, Cameroon
- Listed height: 7 ft 0 in (2.13 m)
- Listed weight: 257 lb (117 kg)

Career information
- High school: Archbishop Carroll (Washington, D.C.)
- College: Georgetown (1997–2001)
- NBA draft: 2001: 2nd round, 50th overall pick
- Drafted by: Portland Trail Blazers
- Playing career: 2001–2011
- Position: Center
- Number: 44

Career history
- 2001–2004: Portland Trail Blazers
- 2004–2005: Fayetteville Patriots
- 2005–2006: Panellinios
- 2006–2007: Alba Berlin
- 2007–2010: EWE Baskets Oldenburg
- 2010–2011: Artland Dragons
- 2011: Bayern Munich

Career highlights
- Third-team All-Big East (2000); Big East Scholar-Athlete of the Year (2001)
- Stats at NBA.com
- Stats at Basketball Reference

Ruben Bertrand Boumtje-Boumtje (born 20 May 1978) is a Cameroonian professional basketball executive and former player who last served as the assistant general manager of the Delaware Blue Coats of the NBA G League. He played college basketball for the Georgetown Hoyas and professionally in the National Basketball Association (NBA) for the Portland Trail Blazers. Boumtje-Boumtje retired in November 2011 at age 33 due to a heart condition.

== High school and college ==
Boumtje-Boumtje attended Archbishop Carroll High School in Washington, D.C. for one year. He played college basketball at Georgetown University and holds career averages of 9.6 points and 7.0 rebounds per game. He currently ranks fifth on the Hoyas' all-time blocked shots list with 255, behind Patrick Ewing, Alonzo Mourning, Dikembe Mutombo, and Roy Hibbert.

== Professional career ==
=== NBA ===
Boumtje-Boumtje was selected in the 2001 NBA draft by the Portland Trail Blazers with the 50th overall pick and participated in 44 games over three seasons from 2001 to 2004. What ended up being his final regular season NBA game took place on December 20, 2003, while the Blazers visited the San Antonio Spurs in a losing effort; Boumtje-Boumtje recorded one foul and one missed field goal in four minutes of playing time. On January 21, 2004, he was traded along with guard Jeff McInnis to the Cleveland Cavaliers in exchange for small forward Darius Miles.

He was waived soon afterwards, having never played a game for them. In July 2005, Boumtje-Boumtje was drafted in the 2005 AAPBL Draft but the league folded before a game was even played. On August 22, 2005, it was announced the Orlando Magic had signed him to a contract of undisclosed terms. He had played five games with them during the 2005 Reebok Vegas Summer League while averaging 4.8 points, shooting 56.3 percent of his field goals (9-of-16), and 3.6 rebounds in 16.8 minutes per game.

=== European leagues ===
Boumtje-Boumtje played the 2006–07 season for Alba Berlin in the ULEB Cup and the German Basketball Bundesliga. After the season, his contract was not renewed, but he joined league rival EWE Baskets Oldenburg in November as a replacement for injured Dan McClintock and later signed for the remainder of the 2007–08 season. Oldenburg renewed his contract for the 2008–09 season. The team became the German league champions in June 2009.

In 2010 Boumtje-Boumtje joined the Artland Dragons in Germany. In 2011, he signed with Bayern Munich, but he immediately retired after just 4 games, because of an irregularity with his heart.

=== Executive career ===
After his playing career, Boumtje-Boumtje joined the Philadelphia 76ers’ staff as a technical scout. In 2019, he was hired as the assistant general manager of the Delaware Blue Coats of the NBA G League. In June 2020, he was let go from the 76ers organization after his contract was not renewed.

== Personal life ==
Boumtje-Boumtje speaks three languages - a native Cameroonian language, French and English. At Georgetown he was a pre-med, as well as a mathematics and biology double major. He was named Big East Scholar-Athlete of the Year in 2001, an honor often reserved for athletes in non-televised sports, and used the occasion to restate his intention to attend medical school if he were not drafted by the NBA. In 2014, Boumtje-Boumtje earned a master's degree in Applied Mathematics and Statistics from Georgetown University before completing an internship at Elder Research.

Boumtje-Boumtje has a son named Joaquim Boumtje-Boumtje who plays basketball in the FC Barcelona organization in Spain. On April 30, 2026, Joaquim committed to the Duke Blue Devils.

== Career statistics ==
Legend
GP	Games played	GS	Games started	MPG	Minutes per game
FG%	Field goal percentage	3P%	3-point field goal percentage	FT%	Free throw percentage
RPG	Rebounds per game	APG	Assists per game	SPG	Steals per game
BPG	Blocks per game	PPG	Points per game	**Bold**	Career high

=== NBA ===
==== Regular season ====
Year	Team	GP	GS	MPG	FG%	3P%	FT%	RPG	APG	SPG	BPG	PPG
2001–02	Portland	**33**	**1**	**7.4**	**.406**	–	.520	**1.7**	.1	.1	**.5**	**1.2**
2002–03	Portland	2	0	2.5	.000	–	–	.5	**.5**	**.5**	.0	.0
2003–04	Portland	9	0	2.9	.200	–	**1.000**	.1	.1	.0	.1	.4
Career		44	1	6.3	.368	–	.556	1.3	.1	.1	.4	1.0

=== College ===
Year	Team	GP	GS	MPG	FG%	3P%	FT%	RPG	APG	SPG	BPG	PPG
1997-98	Georgetown	6	0	13.3	.350	.000	.286	4.7	.7	.5	1.7	2.7
1998-99	Georgetown	31	31	**27.5**	.465	.000	.549	7.0	**1.1**	**.9**	**2.9**	8.5
1999-00	Georgetown	31	22	26.3	.487	–	.714	**7.7**	.7	**.9**	2.5	**12.8**
2000-01	Georgetown	**33**	**33**	21.6	**.517**	–	**.718**	6.8	.9	.7	2.4	9.1
Career		101	86	24.4	.485	.000	.664	7.0	.9	.8	2.5	9.6
