= 1999–2000 Georgetown Hoyas men's basketball team =

American college basketball season

1999–2000 Georgetown Hoyas men's basketball

National Invitation Tournament, Second Round
- Conference: Big East Conference
- Record: 19–15 (6–10 Big East)
- Head coach: Craig Esherick (2nd season)
- Assistant coaches: Mike Riley (18th season); Ronny Thompson (2nd season); Chip Simms (1st season)
- Captains: Rhese Gibson; Jameel Watkins
- Home arena: MCI Center

1999–2000 Big East men's basketball standings
	Conf.				Overall
Team	W		L	PCT	W		L	PCT
No. 16 Syracuse	13	–	3	.813	26	–	6	.813
No. 23 Miami (FL)	13	–	3	.813	23	–	11	.676
No. 9 St. John's†	12	–	4	.750	25	–	8	.758
No. 20 Connecticut	10	–	6	.625	25	–	10	.714
Seton Hall	10	–	6	.625	22	–	10	.688
Villanova	8	–	8	.500	20	–	13	.606
Notre Dame	8	–	8	.500	22	–	15	.595
West Virginia	6	–	10	.375	14	–	14	.500
Georgetown	6	–	10	.375	19	–	15	.559
Rutgers	6	–	10	.375	15	–	16	.484
Pittsburgh	5	–	11	.313	13	–	15	.464
Providence	4	–	12	.250	11	–	19	.367
Boston College	3	–	13	.188	11	–	19	.367
† 2000 Big East tournament winner As of April 3, 2000; Rankings from AP poll

The 1999–2000 Georgetown Hoyas men's basketball team represented Georgetown University in the 1999–2000 NCAA Division I college basketball season. The Hoyas were coached by Craig Esherick in his first full season as head coach; he had replaced John Thompson in mid-season the previous year after Thompson's resignation. The Hoyas played most of their home games at the MCI Center in Washington, DC, although they played two home games at McDonough Gymnasium on the Georgetown campus. They were members of the Big East Conference and finished the season 19–15, 6–10 in Big East play. They advanced to the semifinals of the 2000 Big East men's basketball tournament before losing to Connecticut. Not invited to the NCAA tournament, they appeared in the 2000 National Invitation Tournament (NIT) – their third consecutive NIT appearance – and advanced to the second round before losing to California.

== Season recap ==
=== Regular season ===
After Georgetown stumbled to a 15–16 record the previous season – the Hoyas' first losing season since 1972–73 – Esherick, with control over the team for a full season for the first time, introduced a taller lineup this year centered around 6-foot-7 (201-cm) freshman forward Victor Samnick, 6-foot-10 freshman center (208-cm) Lee Scruggs, and 6-foot-11 (211-cm) junior center Ruben Boumtje-Boumtje. This change reduced junior guard Nat Burton into a reserve role and his offensive production dropped from the previous year, but he nonetheless started 15 of the team's 34 games and averaged 7.1 points and 4.8 rebounds per game for the season. He scored in double figures seven times.

Junior guard Anthony Perry had led the team in scoring the previous year, and he started this season strong, including 18 points against fourth-ranked North Carolina and 19 against sixth-ranked Florida in back-to-back games in the Maui Invitational Tournament in the latter half of November 1999. On January 8, 2000, however, he shot only 1-for-10 (10%) from the field against Seton Hall at the MCI Center, and after that his scoring declined. By the end of the year, he was averaging only 8.7 points per game, down from 14.0 points per game the previous season, although his shooting average from the field improved from 33.8 percent in 1998–99 to 34.7 percent in 1999–2000 and he scored the winning basket as the Hoyas upset Louisville at the MCI Center at the beginning of February 2000.

With Perry in a shooting slump for much of the season, sophomore guard Kevin Braswell led the team in scoring. Starting all 34 games – in fact, he started all 128 games during his collegiate career – he averaged 22.3 points per game during the three games of the Maui Invitational and scored in double figures 10 times in the first 11 games of the year. Although he shot only 1-for-13 (7.7%) from the field in the Big East season opener against Providence, he recovered to shoot a combined 45% from the field and average 20 points a game in five straight games in January 2000. Inconsistent play plagued him throughout his career, however, and he followed this successful five-game stretch with another five games in which he shot only a combined 17 percent from the field.

An injury forced junior center Ruben Boumtje-Boumtje to miss the season opener, and it limited him in the next four games. In the sixth and seventh games of the year, however, he scored a combined 35 points and grabbed 21 rebounds against Howard and Bethune–Cookman. He followed this up with 18 points and 15 rebounds against James Madison at the beginning of January 2000, a career-high 32 points against Southern of New Orleans in February 2000, and 27 points against Pittsburgh three days later; by mid-February he was averaging 18 points, eight rebounds, and three blocked shots per game in Big East play. A foot injury sidelined him late in the regular season, but he finished the year averaging 12.8 points, 7.7 rebounds, and 2.5 blocked shots per game for the season overall.

After the defeat of James Madison at the beginning of 2000, Georgetown's record stood at 8–3 with two of the losses against Top Six opponents – as Big East play began, and hopes ran high among Hoya fans that the team could win the conference's regular season behind the play of Boumtje-Boumtje, Braswell, Perry, and the others. However, the 1999-2000 Hoyas were a disappointment in conference play, posting a 16–13 regular-season record overall and finishing in a three-way tie for eighth place in the Big East with a 6–10 conference record.

=== Big East tournament ===
The eighth-place finish gave the Hoyas the No. 9 seed in the 2000 Big East tournament. In the first round, they upset No. 8 seed West Virginia, with Braswell scoring 19 points, including a game-winning three-pointer with less than a second left in the game.

The Hoyas advanced to a quarterfinal meeting the following day with archrival Syracuse, ranked 12th in the nation and seeded No. 1 in the tournament. During the early part of the first half of the game and again early in the second half, Georgetown's defense held Syracuse scoreless for a stretch, allowing the Hoyas to build a seven-point lead. Scruggs shot 9-for-14 (64.3%) from the field and scored 20 points. Braswell also had a 20-point game, including a 10-for-12 (83.3%) performance from the free-throw line, as well as eight assists. Braswell and Georgetown guard Demetrius Hunter held Syracuse senior point guard Jason Hart to 3-for-10 (30%) shooting from the field. When Braswell passed the ball inside to Boumtje-Boumtje and Boumtje-Boumtje scored on a dunk with 4:29 to play, electrifying the crowd, Georgetown took a 60–51 lead. Syracuse closed to a three-point deficit but got no closer, and after Braswell deflected the ball late in the game, Georgetown won 76–72 in a huge upset. It was only the second time in 19 years that a Big East tournament No. 1 seed lost in the quarterfinals. During the game, the Hoyas shot 27-for-31 (87.1%) from the free-throw line, while Syracuse shot only 9-for-18 (50%) in free throws.

The big win over Syracuse gave Georgetown its only appearance in the semifinals of the Big East tournament between 1997 and 2006. In the semifinal game, the Hoyas faced the tournament's No. 4 seed, 21st-ranked Connecticut, and lost 70–55. The loss left Georgetown with an overall record of 18–14, not enough to receive an invitation to the 2000 NCAA tournament. It was the third straight season that Georgetown missed the tournament, the first time that had happened since the 1971–72, 1972–73, and 1973–74 teams had missed postseason play in consecutive years.

=== National Invitation tournament ===
For the third consecutive season, Georgetown appeared in the National Invitation Tournament (NIT). In the first round, the Hoyas went on the road on March 15, 2000, to face favored Virginia on national television in one of the greatest games in both NIT and Georgetown history.

The Hoyas entered the game with both Boumtje-Boumtje and Samnick out with injuries and only nine scholarship players available. In the first half, Braswell shot 1-for-6 (16.7%) in his first six field goal attempts and missed his first two free throws, while Scruggs committed two personal fouls early in the game. Virginia, meanwhile, scored easily and went on a 14–0 run, although Georgetown freshman guard Demetrius Hunter kept Georgetown in the game with four three-point shots and the Hoyas managed to tie the game at 29–29 with 6:36 left in the half. Virginia pulled away again, and at halftime led 49–38. By five minutes into the second half, the Cavaliers had extended their lead to 58–43, but the Hoyas then went on a 17–2 run to tie the game at 60-60 with under 11 minutes to play. Virginia took the lead with 7:48 left in regulation and the Hoyas lost Hunter, freshman forward Courtland Freeman, and senior center Jameel Watkins to foul-outs. In the final 3:39 of regulation, Virginia shot 1-for-7 (14.3%) from the field, and Georgetown trailed by only four points with less than two minutes left. With 1:48 remaining, Burton sank two free throws, and, after Virginia failed to score on its next position, Perry scored on a layup to tie the score at 77–77 with 1:14 left. Scruggs blocked a Virginia drive to the basket with two seconds left, Burton missed on a 50-foot (15-meter) last-second shot, and the game went into overtime.

In the first overtime, Virginia opened strong, but the Hoyas stayed close and took an 84–83 lead on a Nat Burton tip-in, after which Braswell scored on two free throws to give Georgetown an 86–83 lead. Scruggs began to limp and came out of the game, reducing the Hoyas to only four scholarship players (Braswell, Burton, Perry, and senior forward Rhese Gibson) and walk-on sophomore forward Gharun Hester. Despite the shortage of personnel, Georgetown held an 88–85 lead with 14 seconds left when Hester fouled Virginia freshman guard Roger Mason, Jr., as he scored, and he sank his free throw to tie the game at 88–88 and force a second overtime. Television cameras had detected a Virginia guard calling a time-out when the Cavaliers had none left, which should have resulted in a technical foul, but when Esherick complained about it between overtime periods he was called for a technical instead.

With 2:51 left in the second overtime and Virginia leading 96–93, an exhausted Scruggs went to the bench. Perry tied the game with a three-pointer, after which Virginia's Donald Hand hit a three-pointer. Braswell then replied wkith another three-pointer – the third three-point shot in a minute – to tie the game at 99–99. After Virginia missed on its next possession and then fouled Gibson, Gibson sank two free throws to give the Hoyas a 101–99 lead. With 24 seconds remaining, Virginia sophomore forward Chris Williams scored to tie the game at 101–101, making Virginia the first team to score 100 or more points against Georgetown since Seton Hall scored 102 in a win over the Hoyas in January 1976. Time expired, and Georgetown played a third overtime for the first time since January 1955.

With only five players left and three of them playing with four fouls, Georgetown had to avoid fouling and Chris Williams was able to take advantage of that to score twice and give Virginia a 105–101 lead with 3:38 remaining. But then the Hoya defense stopped Virginia on three consecutive possessions while Hester, Burton, and Braswell each scored, giving Georgetown a 107–105 lead with 2:20 left to play. After each team sank two free throws, Virginia scored inside to tie the game at 109-109 with 40 seconds left. After a time-out, Braswell passed the ball to Hester, who launched a 22-foot (6.7-meter) shot and scored the first three-point field goal of his two-year collegiate career, giving the Hoyas a 112–109 lead with 31 seconds to play. Virginia barely missed a three-pointer in response, Georgetown sank one of two free throws, and the Cavaliers then scored inside to close to 113–111. Virginia got the ball back, again missed a three-pointer, and fouled Braswell with 6.8 seconds remaining. After Braswell missed one of his two free throws, Virginia was trailing 114–111 and still had a chance to tie the game, but the Cavaliers threw the ball out of bounds and fouled Braswell on the inbounds pass. Braswell sank one of his two free throws, and the game finally ended after three-and-a-half hours of play with a 115–111 upset Hoya victory. Scruggs and Braswell required intravenous fluids after the game.

The Hoyas shot 49 percent from the field during the game. Gibson tied his career high with 13 rebounds in 38 minutes of play, while Gharun Hester had career highs in both points scored (9) and rebounds (10). Braswell scored 11 field goals, 14 free throws, and 40 points in the game – joining Allen Iverson as the only Georgetown players since 1970 to score 40 points in a game – with 14 of his points coming in the second half and 18 in the three overtimes; he shot 4-for-6 (66.7%) from the field and 10-for-12 (83.3%) from the free-throw line in overtime. His 49 minutes of play set a record for the most minutes played by one Georgetown player in a single game.

The game set a number of other records, including the most combined points in a Georgetown game (226, breaking the previous record of 216 set in a game against Holy Cross in January 1973), the most combined points in an NIT game (breaking the previous record of 213 set by Connecticut and Saint Louis in the 1955 NIT), the most three-point field goals made in a Georgetown game (12, tying the record set twice in 1996 in games against Providence and Miami), most points scored by Georgetown in a postseason game (115, breaking the record of 98 set against Texas Tech in the 1996 NCAA tournament), and the most combined points in a Georgetown post-season game (226, breaking the record of 188 set in the Texas Tech game in the 1996 NCAA tournament).

Six days after the grueling win over Virginia, Georgetown faced California in the second round. Braswell was unable to repeat his heroics, shooting 1-for-12 (8.3%) from the field and scoring only two points, and the Hoyas' season came to an end with a 60–49 loss to the Golden Bears.

== Roster ==
#	Name	Height	Weight (lbs.)	Position	Class	Hometown	Previous Team(s)
1	Demetrius Hunter	6'2"	205	G	Fr.	Las Vegas, NV, U.S.	Cheyenne HS
2	Courtland Freeman	6'9"	228	F/C	Fr.	Myrtle Beach, SC, U.S.	Socastee HS
4	David Paulus	6'4"	195	G	Fr.	Syracuse, NY, U.S.	Christian Brothers Academy
5	Anthony Perry	6'3"	186	G	So.	Jersey City, NJ, U.S.	St. Anthony HS
11	Trenton Hillier	5'9"	165	G	Fr.	Chagrin Falls, OH, U.S.	Kenston HS
12	Kevin Braswell	6'2"	190	G	So.	Baltimore, MD, U.S.	Lake Clifton HS
13	Victor Samnick	6'8"	208	F	Fr.	Douala, Cameroon	Newport Prep (Md)
20	Gharun Hester	6'4"	205	F	So.	Fort Washington, MD, U.S.	Friendly HS
23	Jason Burns	6'5"	175	F	Fr.	Las Vegas, NV, U.S.	Durango High School
25	Nat Burton	6'4"	218	G/F	Jr.	Washington, DC, U.S.	Winchendon Prep (Winchendon, MA)
32	Rhese Gibson	6'8"	230	F	Sr.	New York, NY, U.S.	All Hallows HS
40	Jameel Watkins	6'10"	244	C	Sr.	Brooklyn, NY, U.S.	Paul Robeson HS
44	Ruben Boumtje-Boumtje	7'0"	257	C	Jr.	Yaounde, Cameroon	Archbishop Carroll HS (Washington, DC)
45	Lee Scruggs	6'11"	216	C	Fr.	Franklinton, NC, U.S.	Franklinton HS; Daytona Beach Community College

== Rankings ==
The team was not ranked in the Top 25 in the AP Poll at any time. It also was not ranked in the Top 25 in the final or postseason Coaches' Poll; its Coaches' Poll rankings during the rest of the season are not available.

== 1999–2000 Schedule and results ==
Sources

- All times are Eastern

Date time, TV	Rank^{#}	Opponent^{#}	Result	Record	Site (attendance) city, state
Preseason
Sun., Oct. 31, 1999		Fort Hood (U.S. Army All-Star Team)	W 98–85	exhibition	McDonough Gymnasium (N/A); Washington, DC
Regular Season
Fri., Nov. 19, 1999*		Morgan State	W 81–68	1–0	McDonough Gymnasium (2,139); Washington, DC
Mon., Nov. 22, 1999*		vs. Memphis; Maui Invitational Tournament Quarterfinal	W 71–55	2–0	Lahaina Civic Center (2,400); Lahaina, HI
Tue., Nov. 23, 1999*		vs. No. 4 North Carolina; Maui Invitational Tournament Semifinal	L 79–85	2–1	Lahaina Civic Center (2,400); Lahaina, HI
Wed., Nov. 24, 1999*		vs. No. 6 Florida; Maui Invitational Tournament Semifinal 3rd Place	L 62–72	2–2	Lahaina Civic Center (2,400); Lahaina, HI
Sun., Nov. 28, 1999*		at Nevada-Las Vegas	L 69–85	2–3	Thomas & Mack Center (N/A); Las Vegas, NV
Mon., Dec. 6, 1999*		Howard	W 78–37	3–3	MCI Center (6,189); Washington, DC
Wed., Dec. 8, 1999*		Bethune-Cookman	W 91–62	4–3	MCI Center (5,785); Washington, DC
Sun., Dec. 12, 1999*		Marist	W 73–63	5–3	MCI Center (5,212); Washington, DC
Sat., Dec. 18, 1999*		Houston	W 83–75	6–3	MCI Center (7,198); Washington, DC
Thu., Dec. 30, 1999*		Coastal Carolina	W 85–57	7–3	MCI Center (6,039); Washington, DC
Sun., Jan. 2, 2000*		James Madison	W 63–48	8–3	MCI Center (6,179); Washington, DC
Wed., Jan. 5, 2000		at Providence	L 48–55	8–4 (0–1)	Providence Civic Center (9,156); Providence, RI
Sat., Jan. 8, 2000		Seton Hall	L 62–65 ^{OT}	8–5 (0–2)	MCI Center (8,452); Washington, DC
Wed., Jan. 12, 2000		at St. John's	L 66–75	8–6 (0–3)	Madison Square Garden (11,882); New York, NY
Sat., Jan. 15, 2000		Miami	W 65–61	9–6 (1–3)	MCI Center (7,189); Washington, DC
Wed., Jan. 18, 2000		at Boston College	W 72–69	10–6 (2–3)	Silvio O. Conte Forum (5,711); Chestnut Hill, MA
Sat., Jan. 22, 2000; CBS		Connecticut; Rivalry	L 71–92	10–7 (2–4)	MCI Center (16,989); Washington, DC
Wed., Jan. 26, 2000		at West Virginia	L 64–69	10–8 (2–5)	Charleston Civic Center (7,512); Charleston, WV
Sat., Jan. 29, 2000		Rutgers	W 71–55	11−8 (3–5)	MCI Center (8,789); Washington, DC
Tue., Feb. 1, 2000*		Louisville	W 61–59	12–8	MCI Center (7,189); Washington, DC
Sat., Feb. 5, 2000		Villanova	L 69–72	12–9 (3–6)	MCI Center (10,137); Washington, DC
Mon., Feb. 7, 2000		at Miami	L 55–77	12–10 (3–7)	Miami Arena (3,466); Miami, FL
Thu., Feb. 10, 2000*		Southern-New Orleans	W 90–67	13–10	McDonough Gymnasium (2,121); Washington, DC
Sun., Feb. 13, 2000		at Pittsburgh	W 72–65	14–10 (4–7)	Civic Arena (6,215); Pittsburgh, PA
Sun., Feb. 20, 2000		Pittsburgh	W 62–50	15–10 (5–7)	MCI Center (10,789); Washington, DC
Mon., Feb. 22, 2000		at Rutgers	L 71–88	15–11 (5–8)	Louis Brown Athletic Center (7,641); Piscataway, NJ
Sun., Feb. 27, 2000; 2:05 p.m., CBS		at No. 13 Syracuse; Rivalry	L 52–67	15–12 (5–9)	Carrier Dome (31,009); Syracuse, NY
Wed., Mar. 1, 2000		West Virginia	W 72–54	16–12 (6–9)	MCI Center (7,189); Washington, DC
Fri., Mar. 4, 2000		Notre Dame	L 54–77	16–13 (6–10)	MCI Center (14,304); Washington, DC
Big East tournament
Wed., Mar. 8, 2000		vs. West Virginia; First Round	W 70–67	17–13	Madison Square Garden (17,729); New York, NY
Thu., Mar. 9, 2000; 12:00 noon		vs. No. 12 Syracuse; Quarterfinal/Rivalry	W 76–72	18–13	Madison Square Garden (18,406); New York, NY
Fri., Mar. 10, 2000		vs. No. 21 Connecticut; Semifinal/Rivalry	L 55–70	18–14	Madison Square Garden (19,528); New York, NY
National Invitation Tournament
Wed., Mar. 15, 2000; ESPN		at Virginia; First Round	W 115–111 ^{3OT}	19–14	University Hall (8,251); Charlottesville, VA
Tue., Mar. 21, 2000		at California; Second Round	L 49–60	19–15	Haas Pavilion (9,394); Berkeley, CA
*Non-conference game. ^{#}Rankings from AP Poll. (#) Tournament seedings in parentheses.
