= 1999–2000 Seton Hall Pirates men's basketball team =

American college basketball season

1999–2000 Seton Hall Pirates men's basketball

NCAA tournament, Sweet Sixteen
- Conference: Big East Conference
- Record: 22–10 (10–6 Big East)
- Head coach: Tommy Amaker (3rd season)
- Assistant coach: Fred Hill (2nd season)
- Home arena: Continental Airlines Arena

1999–2000 Big East men's basketball standings
	Conf.				Overall
Team	W		L	PCT	W		L	PCT
No. 16 Syracuse	13	–	3	.813	26	–	6	.813
No. 23 Miami (FL)	13	–	3	.813	23	–	11	.676
No. 9 St. John's†	12	–	4	.750	25	–	8	.758
No. 20 Connecticut	10	–	6	.625	25	–	10	.714
Seton Hall	10	–	6	.625	22	–	10	.688
Villanova	8	–	8	.500	20	–	13	.606
Notre Dame	8	–	8	.500	22	–	15	.595
West Virginia	6	–	10	.375	14	–	14	.500
Georgetown	6	–	10	.375	19	–	15	.559
Rutgers	6	–	10	.375	15	–	16	.484
Pittsburgh	5	–	11	.313	13	–	15	.464
Providence	4	–	12	.250	11	–	19	.367
Boston College	3	–	13	.188	11	–	19	.367
† 2000 Big East tournament winner As of April 3, 2000; Rankings from AP poll

The 1999–2000 Seton Hall Pirates men's basketball team represented Seton Hall University as a member of the Big East Conference during the 1999–2000 NCAA men's college basketball season. Led by head coach Tommy Amaker, the team played their home games at Continental Airlines Arena in East Rutherford, New Jersey. The Pirates received an at-large bid to the NCAA tournament as No. 10 seed in the East region. After an opening round win over Oregon in overtime, Seton Hall upset No. 2 seed Temple to reach the Sweet Sixteen. The run would come to an end in the Regional semifinal as No. 3 seed Oklahoma State eliminated the Pirates, 68–66. The team finished the season with a record of 22–10 (10–6 Big East).

== Roster ==
1999–2000 Seton Hall Pirates men's basketball team
Players
Coaches

Pos.	#	Name	Height	Weight	Year	Previous school	Hometown
G	0	Ty Shine	6 ft 0 in (1.83 m)	—	So
C	1	Samuel Dalembert	6 ft 11 in (2.11 m)	—	Fr
G	10	Shaheen Holloway	5 ft 10 in (1.78 m)	174 lb (79 kg)	Sr
G	15	Gary Saunders	6 ft 5 in (1.96 m)	—	Sr
C	20	Al Harris	6 ft 8 in (2.03 m)	—	Fr
G	21	Rimas Kaukenas	6 ft 4 in (1.93 m)	—	Sr
G	30	Darius Lane	6 ft 4 in (1.93 m)	—	So
F	31	Charles Manga	6 ft 10 in (2.08 m)	—	So
F	32	Reggie Garrett	6 ft 5 in (1.96 m)	—	Jr
G	41	Brian Campbell	6 ft 4 in (1.93 m)	—	Sr
F	42	Kevin Wilkins	6 ft 8 in (2.03 m)	—	Jr
F	50	Greg Morton	6 ft 7 in (2.01 m)	—	Fr

Head coach

- Tommy Amaker

Assistant coach(es)

- Fred Hill

Legend

- (C) Team captain
- (S) Suspended
- (I) Ineligible
- (W) Walk-on
- Injured
- Current redshirt

Roster
Last update: 2016-Mar-02

== Schedule and results ==
Date time, TV	Rank^{#}	Opponent^{#}	Result	Record	Site city, state
Regular season
Nov 19, 1999*		Quinnipiac	W 91–55	1–0	Continental Airlines Arena; East Rutherford, NJ
Nov 27, 1999*		Drexel	W 69–65	2–0	Walsh Gymnasium; South Orange, NJ
Nov 29, 1999*		Saint Peter's	W 79–65	3–0	Continental Airlines Arena; East Rutherford, NJ
Dec 4, 1999*		vs. George Washington; BB&T Classic	L 63–72	3–1	MCI Center; Washington, D.C.
Dec 5, 1999*		vs. No. 16 Illinois; BB&T Classic	L 61–72	3–2	MCI Center; Washington, D.C.
Dec 11, 1999*		at Florida State	W 79–56	4–2	Tallahassee-Leon County Civic Center; Tallahassee, FL
Dec 13, 1998*		Columbia	W 60–58	5–2	Continental Airlines Arena; East Rutherford, NJ
Dec 20, 1999*		Army	W 77–56	6–2	Continental Airlines Arena; East Rutherford, NJ
Dec 23, 1999*		Stony Brook	W 70–50	7–2	Walsh Gymnasium; South Orange, NJ
Dec 30, 1999		Wagner	W 92–77	8–2	Continental Airlines Arena; East Rutherford, NJ
Jan 4, 2000		Villanova	W 71–64	9–2 (1–0)	Continental Airlines Arena; East Rutherford, NJ
Jan 8, 2000		at Georgetown	W 65–62 ^{OT}	10–2 (2–0)	MCI Center; Washington, D.C.
Jan 11, 2000		Miami (FL)	L 64–71	10–3 (2–1)	Continental Airlines Arena; East Rutherford, NJ
Jan 16, 2000		at Pittsburgh	W 80–68	11–3 (3–1)	Fitzgerald Field House; Pittsburgh, PA
Jan 18, 2000		No. 19 St. John's	W 78–70	12–3 (4–1)	Continental Airlines Arena; East Rutherford, NJ
Jan 26, 2000		at Boston College	W 74–65	13–3 (5–1)	Conte Forum; Chestnut Hill, MA
Jan 30, 2000		at No. 6 Connecticut	L 56–66	13–4 (5–2)	Harry A. Gampel Pavilion; Storrs, CT
Feb 1, 2000		Providence	W 82–67	14–4 (6–2)	Continental Airlines Arena; East Rutherford, NJ
Feb 5, 2000		West Virginia	W 97–66	15–4 (7–2)	Continental Airlines Arena; East Rutherford, NJ
Feb 7, 2000		at No. 4 Syracuse	W 69–67	16–4 (8–2)	Carrier Dome; Syracuse, NY
Feb 9, 2000		at Rutgers	W 65–63 ^{OT}	17–4 (9–2)	Louis Brown Athletic Center; Piscataway, NJ
Feb 12, 2000		Boston College	W 77–66	18–4 (10–2)	Continental Airlines Arena; East Rutherford, NJ
Feb 14, 2000	No. 23	No. 18 Connecticut	L 50–59	18–5 (10–3)	Continental Airlines Arena; East Rutherford, NJ
Feb 19, 2000	No. 23	Notre Dame	L 74–76	18–6 (10–4)	Continental Airlines Arena; East Rutherford, NJ
Feb 23, 2000*		Minnesota	W 64–61	19–6	Continental Airlines Arena; East Rutherford, NJ
Feb 26, 2000		Villanova	L 74–87	19–7 (10–5)	Continental Airlines Arena; East Rutherford, NJ
Feb 29, 2000		at St. John's	L 60–66	19–8 (10–6)	Madison Square Garden; New York, NY
Big East Tournament
Mar 8, 2000*		vs. Providence	W 85–65	20–8	Madison Square Garden; New York, NY
Mar 9, 2000*		vs. No. 21 Connecticut	L 64–79	20–9	Madison Square Garden; New York, NY
NCAA Tournament
Mar 17, 2000*	(10 E)	vs. (7 E) Oregon; First round	W 72–71 ^{OT}	21–9	HSBC Arena; Buffalo, New York
Mar 19, 2000*	(10 E)	vs. (2 E) No. 5 Temple; Second Round	W 67–65 ^{OT}	22–9	HSBC Arena; Buffalo, New York
Mar 24, 2000*	(10 E)	vs. (3 E) No. 14 Oklahoma State; East Regional semifinal – Sweet Sixteen	L 66–68	22–10	Carrier Dome; Syracuse, New York
*Non-conference game. ^{#}Rankings from AP Poll. (#) Tournament seedings in parentheses. E=East.
