= 2000–01 Pittsburgh Panthers men's basketball team =

American college basketball season

2000–01 Pittsburgh Panthers men's basketball

NIT, Second Round, L 61–66 vs. Mississippi State
- Conference: Big East Conference
- Record: 19–14 (7–9 Big East)
- Head coach: Ben Howland (2nd season)
- Assistant coaches: Jamie Dixon (2nd season); Lennie Parham (2nd season); Pat Sandle (2nd season)
- Home arena: Fitzgerald Field House (Capacity: 4,122)

2000–01 Big East men's basketball standings
	Conf.				Overall
Team	W		L	PCT	W		L	PCT
East
No. 7 Boston College †	13	–	3	.813	27	–	5	.844
Providence	11	–	5	.688	21	–	10	.677
St. John's#	8	–	8	.500	5	–	15	.250
Miami	8	–	8	.500	16	–	13	.552
Villanova	8	–	8	.500	18	–	13	.581
Connecticut	8	–	8	.500	20	–	12	.625
Virginia Tech*	2	–	14	.125	8	–	19	.296
West
No. 19 Notre Dame	11	–	5	.688	20	–	10	.667
No. 21 Georgetown	10	–	6	.625	25	–	8	.758
No. 17 Syracuse	10	–	6	.625	25	–	9	.735
West Virginia	8	–	8	.500	17	–	12	.586
Pittsburgh	7	–	9	.438	19	–	14	.576
Seton Hall	5	–	11	.313	16	–	15	.516
Rutgers*	3	–	13	.188	11	–	16	.407
† 2001 Big East tournament winner As of April 2, 2001; Rankings from AP Poll #St. John's had 9 regular-season games vacated due to sanctions against the program; the school′s disputed record was 8–8, 14–15. *Did not qualify for 2001 Big East tournament.

The 2000–01 Pittsburgh Panthers men's basketball team represented the University of Pittsburgh in the 2000–01 NCAA Division I men's basketball season. Led by head coach Ben Howland, the Panthers finished with a record of 19–14. They were invited to the 2001 National Invitation Tournament where they lost in the second round to Mississippi State.
