= 1999–2000 Syracuse Orangemen basketball team =

American college basketball season

1999–2000 Syracuse Orangemen men's basketball

Big East Regular season co-champions

NCAA tournament, Sweet Sixteen
- Conference: Big East Conference

Ranking
- Coaches: No. 12
- AP: No. 16
- Record: 26–6 (13–3 Big East)
- Head coach: Jim Boeheim (24th season)
- Assistant coaches: Bernie Fine (24th season); Mike Hopkins (5th season)
- Home arena: Carrier Dome

1999–2000 Big East men's basketball standings
	Conf.				Overall
Team	W		L	PCT	W		L	PCT
No. 16 Syracuse	13	–	3	.813	26	–	6	.813
No. 23 Miami (FL)	13	–	3	.813	23	–	11	.676
No. 9 St. John's†	12	–	4	.750	25	–	8	.758
No. 20 Connecticut	10	–	6	.625	25	–	10	.714
Seton Hall	10	–	6	.625	22	–	10	.688
Villanova	8	–	8	.500	20	–	13	.606
Notre Dame	8	–	8	.500	22	–	15	.595
West Virginia	6	–	10	.375	14	–	14	.500
Georgetown	6	–	10	.375	19	–	15	.559
Rutgers	6	–	10	.375	15	–	16	.484
Pittsburgh	5	–	11	.313	13	–	15	.464
Providence	4	–	12	.250	11	–	19	.367
Boston College	3	–	13	.188	11	–	19	.367
† 2000 Big East tournament winner As of April 3, 2000; Rankings from AP poll

The 1999–2000 Syracuse Orangemen basketball team represented Syracuse University during the 1999–2000 NCAA men's basketball season. The head coach was Jim Boeheim, serving for his 24th year. The team played its home games at the Carrier Dome in Syracuse, New York. The team finished with a 26–6 (13–3 Big East) record, while making it to the Sweet Sixteen of the NCAA tournament.

== Roster ==
1999–2000 Syracuse Orangemen men's basketball team
Players
Coaches

Pos.	#	Name	Height	Weight	Year	Hometown
G/F	3	Preston Shumpert	6 ft 6 in (1.98 m)	195 lb (88 kg)	So	Fort Walton Beach, Florida
G	5	Jason Hart	6 ft 3 in (1.91 m)	185 lb (84 kg)	So	Westchester, California
G	13	Kueth Duany	6 ft 4 in (1.93 m)	190 lb (86 kg)	Fr	Bloomington, Indiana
F	25	Damone Brown	6 ft 8 in (2.03 m)	202 lb (92 kg)	Jr	Buffalo, New York
F	32	Ryan Blackwell	6 ft 7 in (2.01 m)	220 lb (100 kg)	Sr	Pittsford, New York
C	33	Etan Thomas	6 ft 9 in (2.06 m)	245 lb (111 kg)	Sr	Tulsa, Oklahoma

Head coach

- Jim Boeheim (Syracuse)

Assistant coach(es)

- Bernie Fine (Syracuse)
- Mike Hopkins (Syracuse)

Legend

- (C) Team captain
- (S) Suspended
- (I) Ineligible
- (W) Walk-on
- Injured
- Current redshirt

Roster

== Schedule and results ==
Date time, TV	Rank^{#}	Opponent^{#}	Result	Record	Site city, state
Regular season
Nov 12, 1999*	No. 17	Princeton	W 60–43	1–0	Carrier Dome; Syracuse, New York
Nov 13, 1999*	No. 17	Wisconsin	W 68–49	2–0	Carrier Dome; Syracuse, New York
Nov 22, 1999*	No. 14	Florida Atlantic	W 105–79	3–0	Carrier Dome; Syracuse, New York
Nov 29, 1999*	No. 14	Colgate	W 83–49	4–0	Carrier Dome; Syracuse, New York
Dec 3, 1999*	No. 14	Richmond	W 74–60	5–0	Carrier Dome; Syracuse, New York
Dec 4, 1999*	No. 14	Saint Joseph's	W 82–60	6–0	Carrier Dome; Syracuse, New York
Dec 7, 1999*	No. 12	Albany	W 86–46	7–0	Carrier Dome; Syracuse, New York
Dec 22, 1999*	No. 10	La Salle	W 68–52	8–0	Carrier Dome; Syracuse, New York
Dec 29, 1999*	No. 9	Hartford	W 90–69	9–0	Carrier Dome; Syracuse, New York
Jan 5, 2000	No. 7	Rutgers	W 93–74	10–0 (1–0)	Carrier Dome; Syracuse, New York
Jan 8, 2000	No. 7	at Miami (FL)	W 67–55	11–0 (2–0)	Miami Arena; Miami, Florida
Jan 11, 2000	No. 7	at West Virginia	W 76–63	12–0 (3–0)	Charleston Civic Center; Morgantown, West Virginia
Jan 13, 2000*	No. 7	at South Carolina	W 77–74 ^{OT}	13–0	Carolina Coliseum; Columbia, South Carolina
Jan 16, 2000	No. 7	Notre Dame	W 80–57	14–0 (4–0)	Carrier Dome; Syracuse, New York
Jan 19, 2000	No. 6	at Pittsburgh	W 82–72	15–0 (5–0)	Fitzgerald Field House; Pittsburgh, Pennsylvania
Jan 24, 2000	No. 4	No. 6 Connecticut	W 88–74	16–0 (6–0)	Carrier Dome; Syracuse, New York
Jan 29, 2000	No. 4	at Boston College	W 73–65	17–0 (7–0)	Silvio O. Conte Forum; Boston, Massachusetts
Jan 31, 2000	No. 4	St. John's	W 63–57	18–0 (8–0)	Carrier Dome; Syracuse, New York
Feb 5, 2000	No. 4	at Providence	W 74–58	19–0 (9–0)	Dunkin' Donuts Center; Providence, Rhode Island
Feb 7, 2000	No. 4	Seton Hall	L 67–69	19–1 (9–1)	Carrier Dome; Syracuse, New York
Feb 10, 2000*	No. 4	at Louisville	L 69–82	19–2	Freedom Hall; Louisville, Kentucky
Feb 13, 2000*; CBS	No. 4	UCLA	W 71–67	20–2	Carrier Dome; Syracuse, New York
Feb 16, 2000	No. 9	Pittsburgh	W 83–62	21–2 (10–1)	Carrier Dome; Syracuse, New York
Feb 19, 2000	No. 9	at St. John's	L 75–76	21–3 (10–2)	Madison Square Garden; New York, New York
Feb 23, 2000	No. 13	Villanova	W 91–63	22–3 (11–2)	Carrier Dome; Syracuse, New York
Feb 27, 2000	No. 13	Georgetown; Rivalry	W 67–52	23–3 (12–2)	Carrier Dome; Syracuse, New York
Mar 1, 2000	No. 9	at Notre Dame	W 73–71	24–3 (13–2)	Joyce Center; Notre Dame, Indiana
Mar 4, 2000; CBS	No. 9	at No. 24 Connecticut	L 54–69	24–4 (13–3)	Harry A. Gampel Pavilion; Storrs, Connecticut
Big East Tournament
Mar 9, 2000*	(1) No. 12	vs. (9) Georgetown; Quarterfinal/Rivalry	L 72–76	24–5	Madison Square Garden; New York, New York
NCAA Tournament
Mar 16, 2000*; CBS	(4 MW) No. 16	vs. (13 MW) Samford; First round	W 79–65	25–5	CSU Convocation Center; Cleveland, Ohio
Mar 18, 2000*; CBS	(4 MW) No. 16	vs. (5 MW) No. 19 Kentucky; Second Round	W 52–50	26–5	CSU Convocation Center; Cleveland, Ohio
Mar 23, 2000*; CBS	(4 MW) No. 16	vs. (1 MW) No. 2 Michigan State; Midwest Regional semifinal – Sweet Sixteen	L 58–75	26–6	The Palace of Auburn Hills (21,214); Auburn Hills, Michigan
*Non-conference game. ^{#}Rankings from AP Poll. (#) Tournament seedings in parentheses. MW=Midwest.
