= Hinsdale Central School =

Location
- 3701 Main St; Hinsdale, New York 14743; United States; 42°9′43″N 78°23′43″W

Information
- Type: Public
- School district: Hinsdale Central School District
- NCES District ID: 3614490
- Superintendent: Scott Carroll
- NCES School ID: 361449001203
- Principal: Tyler Sard
- Teaching staff: 41.00 (on an FTE basis)
- Grades: PK-12
- Enrollment: 349 (2024-2025)
- Student to teacher ratio: 8.51
- Campus: Rural: Remote
- Colors: Blue and White
- Mascot: Bobcats
- Yearbook: Panorama
- Website: www.hinsdalebobcats.org

Hinsdale Central School is a Pre-K through 12 school in Hinsdale, Cattaraugus County, New York, United States. It serves the towns of Hinsdale, Ischua, and portions of Portville and Olean. The school currently enrolls around 500 students.

== Athletics ==
Hinsdale Central School's mascot is the bobcat. The women's teams, like many other schools, implements 'Lady' into their name and thus are known as the Lady Bobcats.

The school's football team program was cancelled prior to the 1999 season due to a loss in numbers. The program restarted in 2006 but was cancelled again following the 2008 season football.

=== Sports offered ===
The school offers the following sports:

- Soccer
- Volleyball
- Basketball
- Baseball
- Softball
- Bowling
