= 1999–2000 Miami Hurricanes men's basketball team =

American college basketball season

1999–2000 Miami Hurricanes men's basketball

Big East Regular season co-champions

NCAA tournament, Sweet Sixteen
- Conference: Big East Conference

Ranking
- Coaches: No. 20
- AP: No. 23
- Record: 23–11 (13–3 Big East)
- Head coach: Leonard Hamilton (10th season)
- Home arena: Miami Arena

1999–2000 Big East men's basketball standings
	Conf.				Overall
Team	W		L	PCT	W		L	PCT
No. 16 Syracuse	13	–	3	.813	26	–	6	.813
No. 23 Miami (FL)	13	–	3	.813	23	–	11	.676
No. 9 St. John's†	12	–	4	.750	25	–	8	.758
No. 20 Connecticut	10	–	6	.625	25	–	10	.714
Seton Hall	10	–	6	.625	22	–	10	.688
Villanova	8	–	8	.500	20	–	13	.606
Notre Dame	8	–	8	.500	22	–	15	.595
West Virginia	6	–	10	.375	14	–	14	.500
Georgetown	6	–	10	.375	19	–	15	.559
Rutgers	6	–	10	.375	15	–	16	.484
Pittsburgh	5	–	11	.313	13	–	15	.464
Providence	4	–	12	.250	11	–	19	.367
Boston College	3	–	13	.188	11	–	19	.367
† 2000 Big East tournament winner As of April 3, 2000; Rankings from AP poll

The 1999–2000 Miami Hurricanes men's basketball team represented the University of Miami during the 1999–2000 NCAA Division I men's basketball season.

The University of Miami men's basketball team, led by head coach Leonard Hamilton, played their home games at the Miami Arena as members of the Big East Conference. They finished the season 23–11, 13–3 in Big East play to finish in a tie for first place. They lost in the semifinals of the Big East tournament to St. John's, but received an at-large invitation to the NCAA tournament as No. 6 seed in the South region. Miami defeated Arkansas and No. 3 seed Ohio State to reach the first Sweet Sixteen in program history. In the regional semifinal round, the Hurricanes lost to the Golden Hurricane of Tulsa, 80–71.

== Roster ==
1999–2000 Miami Hurricanes men's basketball team
Players
Coaches

Pos.	#	Name	Height	Weight	Year	Hometown
G/F	00	Leroy Hurd	6 ft 7 in (2.01 m)	205 lb (93 kg)	Fr	Moss Point, MS
G/F	3	Michael Simmons	6 ft 0 in (1.83 m)	185 lb (84 kg)	So	Los Angeles, CA
F	11	Jerry Schlie	6 ft 6 in (1.98 m)	200 lb (91 kg)	Jr	Holbrook, NY
G	13	Paulo Coelho	6 ft 2 in (1.88 m)	185 lb (84 kg)	So	Figueira da Foz, Portugal
F	25	Elton Tyler	6 ft 9 in (2.06 m)	215 lb (98 kg)	Jr	Dorchester, MA
G/F	30	Vernon Jennings	6 ft 4 in (1.93 m)	203 lb (92 kg)	Sr	Baltimore, MD
G/F	31	Johnny Hemsley	6 ft 5 in (1.96 m)	195 lb (88 kg)	Sr	College Park, GA
F	33	James Jones	6 ft 8 in (2.03 m)	211 lb (96 kg)	Fr	Hialeah, FL
F	34	Dwayne Wimbley	6 ft 9 in (2.06 m)	245 lb (111 kg)	Jr	Fort Lauderdale, FL
G	45	John Salmons	6 ft 7 in (2.01 m)	200 lb (91 kg)	So	Philadelphia, PA
F	51	Mario Bland	6 ft 6 in (1.98 m)	265 lb (120 kg)	Sr	Jackson, MS

Head coach

- Leonard Hamilton (UT Martin)

Assistant coach(es)

- Dwight Freeman (Western Colorado)
- Stan Jones (Memphis)
- Scott Howard (Iowa State)

Legend

- (C) Team captain
- (S) Suspended
- (I) Ineligible
- (W) Walk-on
- Injured
- Current redshirt

== Schedule ==
Date time, TV	Rank^{#}	Opponent^{#}	Result	Record	High points	High rebounds	High assists	Site (attendance) city, state
Non-conference regular season
Nov 19, 1999*; 7:50 pm	No. 24	at Central Florida	W 81–54	1–0	17 – Hemsley	7 – Bland	6 – Jennings	UCF Arena (3,449); Orlando, FL
Nov 23, 1999*; 7:30 pm	No. 25	Monmouth	W 67–46	2–0	24 – Hemsley	9 – Bland	7 – Coelho	Miami Arena (2,088); Miami, FL
Nov 30, 1999*; 7:30 pm		Bethune-Cookman	W 102–75	3–0	27 – Tyler	10 – Tyler	12 – Jennings	Miami Arena (2,064); Miami, FL
Dec 4, 1999*; 3:00 pm		at Memphis	L 72–82	3–1	22 – Bland	12 – Bland	6 – Coelho	The Pyramid (10,353); Memphis, TN
Dec 7, 1999*; 7:30 pm		Charlotte	L 65–75	3–2	13 – Bland	12 – Bland	2 – Tied	Miami Arena (2,445); Miami, FL
Dec 11, 1999*; 2:00 pm		Hartford	W 97–61	4–2	20 – Hemsley	12 – Bland	7 – Jennings	Miami Arena (2,041); Miami, FL
Dec 18, 1999*; 7:00 pm		vs. No. 7 North Carolina; Orange Bowl Basketball Classic	L 68–78	4–3	21 – Hemsley	8 – Tyler	5 – Salmons	National Car Rental Center (10,140); Sunrise, FL
Dec 20, 1999*; 3:30 pm		vs. Louisiana–Lafayette; San Juan Shootout First Round	L 60–66	4–4	19 – Hemsley	6 – Jones	3 – Jennings	Rafael A. Mangual Coliseum (569); Mayagüez, PR
Dec 21, 1999*; 2:30 pm		vs. Detroit Mercy; San Juan Shootout Consolation round	W 68–64	5–4	18 – Bland	7 – Tied	6 – Jennings	Rafael A. Mangual Coliseum (155); Mayagüez, PR
Dec 22, 1999*; 2:30 pm		vs. Illinois State; San Juan Shootout 5th place	L 78–87	5–5	18 – Bland	5 – Salmons	10 – Jennings	Rafael A. Mangual Coliseum (123); Mayagüez, PR
Dec 27, 1999*; 7:30 pm		Florida Atlantic	W 89–52	6–5	17 – Salmons	8 – Bland	8 – Jennings	Miami Arena (1,202); Miami, FL
Dec 29, 1999*; 7:30 pm		Quinnipiac	W 80–66	7–5	24 – Hemsley	8 – Salmons	6 – Tied	Miami Arena (1,396); Miami, FL
Jan 5, 2000; 8:00 pm		West Virginia	W 66–58	8–5 (1–0)	25 – Hemsley	5 – Tyler	8 – Jennings	Miami Arena (2,732); Miami, FL
Jan 8, 2000; 12:00 pm		No. 7 Syracuse	L 55–67	8–6 (1–1)	14 – Hemsley	9 – Tyler	7 – Jennings	Miami Arena (3,511); Miami, FL
Jan 11, 2000; 7:30 pm		at Seton Hall	W 71–64	9–6 (2–1)	23 – Hemsley	9 – Hurd	6 – Jennings	Continental Airlines Arena (8,959); East Rutherford, NJ
Jan 15, 2000; 12:00 pm		at Georgetown	L 61–65	9–7 (2–2)	18 – Tyler	7 – Tyler	4 – Jennings	Verizon Center (7,189); Washington, D.C.
Jan 17, 2000; 7:05 pm		at Villanova	W 67–66	10–7 (3–2)	21 – Hemsley	10 – Salmons	6 – Jennings	The Pavilion (6,500); Philadelphia, PA
Jan 22, 2000; 7:30 pm		Boston College	W 62–54	11–7 (4–2)	24 – Bland	9 – Bland	3 – Tied	Miami Arena (5,210); Miami, FL
Jan 25, 2000; 7:30 pm		at Notre Dame	W 63–49	12–7 (5–2)	18 – Hemsley	9 – Wimbley	11 – Jennings	Edmund P. Joyce Center (8,834); Notre Dame, IN
Jan 29, 2000*; 1:00 pm		No. 16 Kentucky	L 57–60	12–8	18 – Hemsley	7 – Bland	5 – Jennings	Miami Arena (9,276); Miami, FL
Feb 1, 2000; 7:30 pm		Pittsburgh	W 64–60	13–8 (6–2)	14 – Jennings	9 – Wimbley	4 – Jennings	Miami Arena (2,424); Miami, FL
Feb 5, 2000; 3:00 pm		at Rutgers	W 58–52	14–8 (7–2)	21 – Hemsley	10 – Salmons	10 – Jennings	Louis Brown Athletic Center (8,515); Piscataway, NJ
Feb 7, 2000; 7:00 pm		Georgetown	W 77–55	15–8 (8–2)	17 – Hemsley	8 – Tied	7 – Jennings	Miami Arena (3,466); Miami, FL
Feb 16, 2000; 7:30 pm		Providence	L 45–47	15–9 (8–3)	11 – Salmons	11 – Salmons	4 – Jennings	Miami Arena (2,578); Miami, FL
Feb 19, 2000; 3:30 pm		at No. 18 Connecticut	W 63–57	16–9 (9–3)	22 – Tyler	8 – Salmons	8 – Jennings	Harry A. Gampel Pavilion (10,027); Storrs, CT
Feb 22, 2000; 7:00 pm		at West Virginia	W 68–50	17–9 (10–3)	24 – Hemsley	7 – Tied	9 – Jennings	Charleston Civic Center (6,281); Charleston, WV
Feb 26, 2000; 7:00 pm		Notre Dame	W 55–52	18–9 (11–3)	14 – Bland	8 – Jennings	6 – Jennings	Miami Arena (6,189); Miami, FL
Feb 29, 2000; 7:30 pm		at Pittsburgh	W 74–66	19–9 (12–3)	21 – Hemsley	10 – Bland	10 – Jennings	Fitzgerald Field House (5,225); Pittsburgh, PA
Mar 5, 2000; 12:00 pm		No. 18 St. John's	W 74–70 ^{OT}	20–9 (13–3)	20 – Tyler	11 – Salmons	8 – Jennings	Miami Arena (7,158); Miami, FL
Big East tournament
Mar 9, 2000*; 7:00 pm	(2) No. 23	vs. (7) Notre Dame; Quarterfinals	W 61–58	21–9	17 – Hemsley	7 – Tied	11 – Jennings	Madison Square Garden (19,472); New York, NY
Mar 10, 2000*; 9:30 pm	(2) No. 23	vs. (3) No. 19 St. John's; Semifinals	L 57–58	21–10	15 – Tyler	8 – Tyler	8 – Jennings	Madison Square Garden (19,528); New York, NY
NCAA tournament
Mar 17, 2000*; 10:20 pm, CBS	(6 S) No. 23	vs. (11 S) Arkansas; First Round	W 75–71	22–10	20 – Hemsley	8 – Tyler	8 – Jennings	Gaylord Entertainment Center (17,297); Nashville, TN
Mar 19, 2000*; 4:40 pm, CBS	(6 S) No. 23	vs. (3 S) No. 8 Ohio State; Second Round	W 75–62	23–10	24 – Hemsley	11 – Bland	6 – Tied	Gaylord Entertainment Center (17,297); Nashville, TN
Mar 24, 2000*; 7:55 pm, CBS	(6 S) No. 23	vs. (7 S) No. 18 Tulsa; Sweet Sixteen	L 71–80	23–11	17 – Tied	9 – Bland	7 – Jennings	Frank Erwin Center (16,000); Austin, TX
*Non-conference game. ^{#}Rankings from AP poll. (#) Tournament seedings in parentheses. S=South. All times are in Eastern Time.
