= 1999–2000 Notre Dame Fighting Irish men's basketball team =

American college basketball season

1999–2000 Notre Dame Fighting Irish men's basketball

NIT, Finals
- Conference: Big East Conference (1979–2013)
- Record: 22–15 (8–8 Big East)
- Head coach: Matt Doherty (1st season)
- Captains: Troy Murphy; Todd Palmer; Skylard Owens
- Home arena: Joyce Center

1999–2000 Big East men's basketball standings
	Conf.				Overall
Team	W		L	PCT	W		L	PCT
No. 16 Syracuse	13	–	3	.813	26	–	6	.813
No. 23 Miami (FL)	13	–	3	.813	23	–	11	.676
No. 9 St. John's†	12	–	4	.750	25	–	8	.758
No. 20 Connecticut	10	–	6	.625	25	–	10	.714
Seton Hall	10	–	6	.625	22	–	10	.688
Villanova	8	–	8	.500	20	–	13	.606
Notre Dame	8	–	8	.500	22	–	15	.595
West Virginia	6	–	10	.375	14	–	14	.500
Georgetown	6	–	10	.375	19	–	15	.559
Rutgers	6	–	10	.375	15	–	16	.484
Pittsburgh	5	–	11	.313	13	–	15	.464
Providence	4	–	12	.250	11	–	19	.367
Boston College	3	–	13	.188	11	–	19	.367
† 2000 Big East tournament winner As of April 3, 2000; Rankings from AP poll

The 1999–2000 Notre Dame Fighting Irish men's basketball team represented the University of Notre Dame during the 1999–2000 NCAA Division I men's basketball season. They finished the regular season with a record of 22–15, 8–8. The team was invited to participate in the 2000 National Invitation Tournament. Notre Dame won games over Michigan, Xavier, BYU and Penn St. They would advance to the championship game before losing to Wake Forest 71–61.

The team was coached by Matt Doherty in his first year at the school. Forward Troy Murphy was the team's captain and leading scorer, averaging 22.7 points per game.

== Schedule ==
Date time, TV	Rank^{#}	Opponent^{#}	Result	Record	Site city, state
Regular season
November 16*		at No. 4 Ohio State	W 59–57	1–0	Value City Arena; Columbus, Ohio
November 18*		Siena	W 107–96	2–0	Joyce Center; Notre Dame, IN
November 21*		Saint Francis (PA)	W 73–60	3–0	Joyce Center; Notre Dame, IN
November 24*		vs. No. 8 Arizona; NIT Season Tip-Off Semifinal	L 60–76	3–1	Madison Square Garden; New York
November 26*		vs. No. 24 Maryland; NIT Season Tip-Off Consolation	L 67–72	3–2	Madison Square Garden; New York
November 30*		at Indiana	L 64–81 ^{OT}	3–3	Assembly Hall; Bloomington, Indiana
December 4*		Vanderbilt	L 85–87 ^{OT}	3–4	Joyce Center; Notre Dame, IN
December 8*		Valparaiso	W 65–42	4–4	Joyce Center (10,382); Notre Dame, IN
December 11*		at Miami (OH)	L 55–71	4–5	Millett Hall; Oxford, Ohio
December 18*		Virginia Military Institute	W 79–66	5–5	Joyce Center; Notre Dame, IN
December 22*		Rider	W 75–62	6–5	Joyce Center; Notre Dame, IN
December 28*		Elon	W 97–71	7–5	Joyce Center; Notre Dame, IN
December 31*		Saint Peter's	W 85–67	8–5	Joyce Center; Notre Dame, IN
January 2*		Loyola Marymount	W 75–57	9–5	Joyce Center; Notre Dame, IN
January 5 WTXX		at No. 2 Connecticut	W 75–70	10–5 (1—0)	Harry A. Gampel Pavilion (16,294); Mansfield, Connecticut
January 12		Boston College	W 86–77	11–5 (2—0)	Joyce Center; Notre Dame, IN
January 16		at No. 7 Syracuse	L 57–80	11–6 (2—1)	Carrier Dome; Syracuse, NY
January 18		at Rutgers	L 51–76	11–7 (2—2)	Louis Brown Athletic Center; Piscataway, NJ
January 22		Pittsburgh	W 81–66	12–7 (3—2)	Joyce Center; Notre Dame, IN
January 25; 7:30 pm		Miami (FL)	L 49–63	12–8 (3—3)	Joyce Center (8,834); Notre Dame, IN
January 29		No. 25 St. John's	W 73–60	13–8 (4—3)	Joyce Center; Notre Dame, IN
February 2		West Virginia	W 79–65	14–8 (5—3)	Joyce Center; Notre Dame, IN
February 6		at Pittsburgh	L 66–72	14–9 (5—4)	Fitzgerald Field House; Pittsburgh, Pennsylvania
February 8		at Villanova	L 69–86	14–10 (5—5)	Wells Fargo Center; Philadelphia, Pennsylvania
February 12; WTXX		No. 13 Connecticut	W 68–66	15–10 (6—5)	Joyce Center (11,418); Notre Dame, IN
February 19		at Seton Hall	W 76–74	16–10 (7—5)	Izod Center; East Rutherford, NJ
February 23		Providence	L 79–89	16–11 (7—6)	Joyce Center; Notre Dame, IN
February 26; 7:00 pm		at Miami (FL)	L 52–55	16–12 (7—7)	Miami Arena (6,189); Miami, Florida
March 1		No. 9 Syracuse	L 71–73	16–13 (7—8)	Joyce Center; Notre Dame, IN
March 4		at Georgetown	W 77–54	17–13 (8—8)	MCI Center (14,304); Washington, D.C.
Big East tournament
March 8	(7)	vs. (10) Rutgers; First Round	W 74–62	18–13 (9–8)	Madison Square Garden; New York
March 9; 7:00 pm	(7)	vs. (2) No. 23 Miami (FL); Quarterfinals	L 58–61	18–14 (9–9)	Madison Square Garden (19,472); New York
NIT
March 15		Michigan; First Round	W 75–65	19–14 (9–9)	Joyce Center; Notre Dame, IN
March 20		Xavier; Second Round	W 76–64	20–14 (9–9)	Joyce Center; Notre Dame, IN
March 22		BYU; Quarterfinal	W 64–52	21–14 (9–9)	Joyce Center; Notre Dame, IN
March 28		vs. Penn State; Semifinals	W 73–52	22–14 (9–9)	Madison Square Garden; New York
March 30		vs. Wake Forest; Finals	L 61–71	23–15 (9–9)	Madison Square Garden; New York
*Non-conference game. ^{#}Rankings from AP Poll. (#) Tournament seedings in parentheses. All times are in Eastern Time.

== Players selected in NBA drafts ==
Year	Round	Pick	Player	NBA club
2001	1	14	Troy Murphy	Golden State Warriors
