= 1999–2000 Connecticut Huskies men's basketball team =

American college basketball season

1999–2000 Connecticut Huskies men's basketball

NCAA tournament, Round of 32
- Conference: Big East Conference

Ranking
- AP: No. 20
- Record: 25–10 (10–6 Big East)
- Head coach: Jim Calhoun (14th season)
- Assistant coaches: Karl Hobbs; Dave Leitao; Tom Moore
- Home arena: Hartford Civic Center; Harry A. Gampel Pavilion

1999–2000 Big East men's basketball standings
| | Conf. | | | | Overall |
| Team | W | | L | PCT | W | | L | PCT |
|---|---|---|---|---|---|---|---|---|
| No. 16 Syracuse | 13 | – | 3 | .813 | 26 | – | 6 | .813 |
| No. 23 Miami (FL) | 13 | – | 3 | .813 | 23 | – | 11 | .676 |
| No. 9 St. John's† | 12 | – | 4 | .750 | 25 | – | 8 | .758 |
| No. 20 Connecticut | 10 | – | 6 | .625 | 25 | – | 10 | .714 |
| Seton Hall | 10 | – | 6 | .625 | 22 | – | 10 | .688 |
| Villanova | 8 | – | 8 | .500 | 20 | – | 13 | .606 |
| Notre Dame | 8 | – | 8 | .500 | 22 | – | 15 | .595 |
| West Virginia | 6 | – | 10 | .375 | 14 | – | 14 | .500 |
| Georgetown | 6 | – | 10 | .375 | 19 | – | 15 | .559 |
| Rutgers | 6 | – | 10 | .375 | 15 | – | 16 | .484 |
| Pittsburgh | 5 | – | 11 | .313 | 13 | – | 15 | .464 |
| Providence | 4 | – | 12 | .250 | 11 | – | 19 | .367 |
| Boston College | 3 | – | 13 | .188 | 11 | – | 19 | .367 |
† 2000 Big East tournament winner As of April 3, 2000; Rankings from AP poll

The 1999–2000 Connecticut Huskies men's basketball team represented the University of Connecticut in the 1999–2000 collegiate men's basketball season. The Huskies completed the season with a 25–10 overall record. The Huskies were members of the Big East Conference where they finished with a 10–6 record. UConn advanced to the Second Round in the 2000 NCAA Division I men's basketball tournament before losing to Tennessee 65–51.

The Huskies played their home games at Harry A. Gampel Pavilion in Storrs, Connecticut and the Hartford Civic Center in Hartford, Connecticut, and they were led by fourteenth-year head coach Jim Calhoun.

== Roster ==
Listed are the student athletes who were members of the 1999–2000 team.

| Name | Position | Year |
|---|---|---|
| Beau Archibald | G | JR |
| Justin Brown | C | FR |
| Marcus Cox | G | FR |
| Ajou Deng | F | SO |
| Khalid El-Amin | G | JR |
| Kevin Freeman | F | SR |
| Albert Mouring | G | JR |
| Stanley Ocitti | F | SO |
| Tony Robertson | G | FR |
| Edmund Saunders | F | JR |
| Jake Voskuhl | C | SR |
| Souleymane Wane | C | SR |
| Brett Watson | G | FR |
| Mike Woodward | F | FR |
| Doug Wrenn | F | FR |

== Schedule ==
| Date time, TV | Rank^{#} | Opponent^{#} | Result | Record | Site (attendance) city, state |
Regular Season
| 11/11/1999*; ESPN2 | No. 1 | vs. Iowa; Coaches vs. Cancer IKON Classic | L 68–70 | 0–1 | Madison Square Garden (19,548); New York, NY |
| 11/12/1999*; ESPN | No. 1 | vs. No. 10 Duke; Coaches vs. Cancer IKON Classic | W 71–66 | 1–1 | Madison Square Garden (19,548); New York, NY |
| 11/19/1999*; WTXX | No. 8 | Vermont | W 89–52 | 2–1 | Harry A. Gampel Pavilion (10,027); Storrs, CT |
| 11/22/1999*; ESPN2 | No. 8 | Massachusetts; MassMutual UGame | W 79–65 | 3–1 | Harry A. Gampel Pavilion (10,027); Storrs, CT |
| 11/29/1999*; WTXX | No. 7 | Coppin State | W 89–44 | 4–1 | Hartford Civic Center (16,150); Hartford, CT |
| 12/4/1999*; WTXX | No. 5 | UNC Asheville | W 98–68 | 5–1 | Harry A. Gampel Pavilion (10,027); Storrs, CT |
| 12/7/1999*; ESPN | No. 6 | vs. No. 2 Arizona; Great Eight Basketball Classic | W 78–69 | 6–1 | United Center (16,294); Chicago, IL |
| 12/12/1999*; WTXX | No. 6 | Fordham | W 94–75 | 7–1 | Harry A. Gampel Pavilion (8,917); Storrs, CT |
| 12/23/1999*; WTXX | No. 2 | Fairfield | W 84–60 | 8–1 | Hartford Civic Center (16,294); Hartford, CT |
| 12/30/1999*; WTXX | No. 2 | at Houston | W 82–76 | 9–1 | Hofheinz Pavilion (8,917); Houston, TX |
| 1/3/2000*; WTXX | No. 2 | Sacred Heart | W 83–56 | 10–1 | Hartford Civic Center (16,294); Hartford, CT |
| 1/5/2000; WTXX | No. 2 | Notre Dame | L 70–75 | 10–2 (0–1) | Hartford Civic Center (16,294); Hartford, CT |
| 1/8/2000; WTXX | No. 2 | at Pittsburgh | W 73–51 | 11–2 (1–1) | Civic Arena (6,798); Pittsburgh, PA |
| 1/10/2000*; ESPN | No. 2 | No. 15 Texas | W 76–67 | 12–2 | Hartford Civic Center (16,294); Hartford, CT |
| 1/16/2000; CBS | No. 5 | St. John's | L 77–82 | 12–3 (1–2) | Harry A. Gampel Pavilion (10,027); Storrs, CT |
| 1/22/2000; CBS | No. 8 | at Georgetown; Rivalry | W 92–71 | 13–3 (2–2) | MCI Center (16,989); Washington, D.C. |
| 1/24/2000; ESPN | No. 8 | at No. 6 Syracuse; Rivalry | L 74–88 | 13–4 (2–3) | Carrier Dome (26,474); Syracuse, NY |
| 1/27/2000; WTXX | No. 6 | Providence | W 64–50 | 14–4 (3–3) | Hartford Civic Center (16,294); Hartford, CT |
| 1/30/2000; WTXX | No. 6 | Seton Hall | W 66–56 | 15–4 (4–3) | Hartford Civic Center (16,294); Hartford, CT |
| 2/2/2000; ESPN | No. 7 | at Villanova | W 74–60 | 16–4 (5–3) | First Union Center (15,541); Philadelphia, PA |
| 2/5/2000*; CBS | No. 7 | at No. 6 Michigan State | L 66–85 | 16–5 | Breslin Center (14,659); East Lansing, MI |
| 2/9/2000; WTXX | No. 13 | Boston College | W 87–58 | 17–5 (6–3) | Hartford Civic Center (16,294); Hartford, CT |
| 2/12/2000; WTXX | No. 13 | at Notre Dame | L 66–68 | 17–6 (6–4) | Edmund P. Joyce Center (11,418); Notre Dame, IN |
| 2/14/2000; ESPN2 | No. 13 | at No. 23 Seton Hall | W 59–50 | 18–6 (7–4) | Continental Airlines Arena (12,369); East Rutherford, NJ |
| 2/19/2000; ABC | No. 18 | Miami | L 57–63 | 18–7 (7–5) | Harry A. Gampel Pavilion (10,027); Storrs, CT |
| 2/21/2000; ESPN | No. 18 | at St. John's | L 64–79 | 18–8 (7–6) | Madison Square Garden (19,410); New York, NY |
| 2/26/2000; WTXX | No. 22 | West Virginia | W 72–71 | 19–8 (8–6) | Harry A. Gampel Pavilion (10,027); Storrs, CT |
| 2/28/2000; ESPN | No. 22 | at Rutgers | W 74–69 | 20–8 (9–6) | Louis Brown Athletic Center (8,504); Piscataway, NJ |
| 3/4/2000; CBS | No. 24 | No. 9 Syracuse; Rivalry | W 79–64 | 21–8 (10–6) | Hartford Civic Center (16,294); Hartford, CT |
Big East tournament
| 3/8/2000; ESPN | No. 21 | vs. Boston College; First round | W 70–55 | 22–8 | Madison Square Garden (17,729); New York, NY |
| 3/9/2000; ESPN | No. 21 | vs. Seton Hall; Quarterfinals | W 79–64 | 23–8 | Madison Square Garden (18,406); New York, NY |
| 3/10/2000; ESPN | No. 21 | vs. Georgetown; Semifinals/Rivalry | W 70–55 | 24–8 | Madison Square Garden (19,528); New York, NY |
| 3/11/2000; ESPN | No. 21 | vs. No. 19 St. John's; Championship | L 70–80 | 24–9 | Madison Square Garden (19,528); New York, NY |
NCAA tournament
| 3/17/2000*; CBS | No. 20 (5) | vs. No. (12) Utah State; First Round | W 75–67 | 25–9 | BJCC (11,061); Birmingham, AL |
| 3/19/2000*; CBS | No. 20 (5) | vs. No. 11 (4) Tennessee; Second Round | L 51–65 | 25–10 | BJCC (16,108); Birmingham, AL |
*Non-conference game. ^{#}Rankings from AP Poll. (#) Tournament seedings in parentheses. All times are in Eastern Time.

Schedule Source:
