= Don Hennon =

American basketball player and surgeon (born 1937)

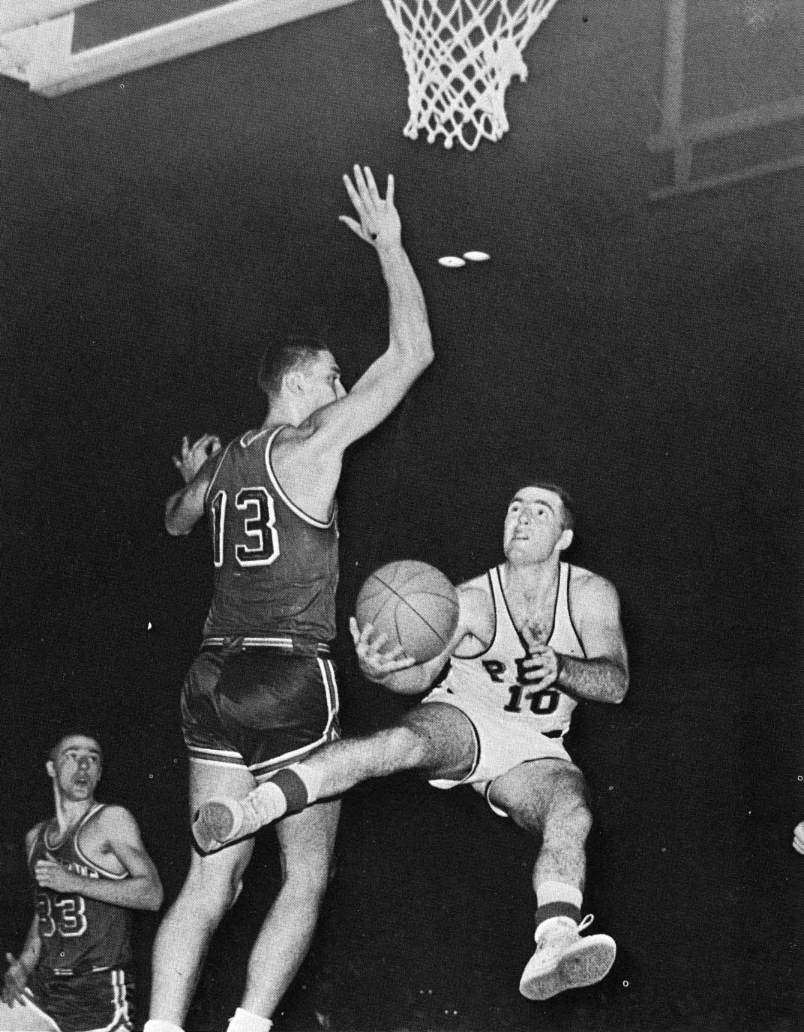
- Don Hennon drives around Duquesne University's Bob Slobodnik during a 71–56 Pitt victory in the Steel Bowl tournament on December 13, 1958

Personal information
- Born: November 8, 1937 (age 89)
- Listed height: 5 ft 8 in (1.73 m)

Career information
- High school: Wampum (Wampum, Pennsylvania)
- College: Pittsburgh (1956–1959)
- NBA draft: 1959: 6th round, 41st overall pick
- Drafted by: Cincinnati Royals
- Position: Point guard
- Number: 10

Career highlights
- Consensus first-team All-American (1958); Consensus second-team All-American (1959); No. 10 retired by Pittsburgh Panthers
- Stats at Basketball Reference

Don Leroy Hennon (born November 8, 1937) is an American surgeon and a former basketball player for the University of Pittsburgh Panthers basketball team, where he was a two-time Consensus All-American. A 5 feet 8 inches (1.73 m) tall guard, Hennon was noted for his prolific scoring ability and is a member of the Helms Athletic Foundation Basketball Hall of Fame.

== Basketball career ==
In high school, Hennon led Wampum High School in Wampum, Pennsylvania to an undefeated 31–0 record and a state championship in 1955. His dad, L. Butler Hennon, was his high school coach and was known for leading the state's smallest high school to 12 league titles and three state championships. During his high school days he set a Western Pennsylvania Interscholastic Athletic League four-year scoring record (1951–55) of 2,376 points that endured until 1993.

Hennon played in college at the University of Pittsburgh from 1956 to 1959, where he led the Panthers to the 1957 NCAA basketball tournament and the 1958 NCAA basketball tournament. While there he became a First Team Consensus All-American selection in 1958 and a Second Team Consensus All-American in 1959, while being named to the United Press International and Helms Foundation first teams that season.

Hennon's basketball career was highlighted by a 1957 contest where he scored a school record 45 points (scoring on 20 of 42 field goals and 4 of 5 free throws), leading Pitt to an 87–84 double-overtime victory over Duke University.

He finished his career at Pitt, an era without the three point shot and before freshman could play, as the school's all-time leading scorer with 1,841 points, and currently remains fifth on the school's all-time scoring list.

The 1958 AP First Team All-American team consisted of Hennon and four Naismith Basketball Hall of Fame inductees: Guy Rodgers Temple, Elgin Baylor Seattle, Wilt Chamberlain Kansas and Oscar Robertson Cincinnati.

Hennon was named to the East team, coached by Adolph Rupp, of the 1959 East-West All-Star Contest.

== Post-college career ==
Hennon was picked 41st by the Cincinnati Royals in the sixth-round of the 1959 NBA draft. He turned down professional basketball in order to study medicine. He earned his MD in 1963 from the University of Pittsburgh School of Medicine and went on to become a surgeon. Hennon spent time as a medical surgeon in the Army and later continued his medical career in the Pittsburgh area, where he still resides.

== Honors ==
Hennon's number 10 jersey was retired by the University of Pittsburgh in 1968.

Hennon was named to the Helms Foundation Basketball Hall of Fame in 1970.

Hennon was inducted into the Lawrence County Hall of Fame in 1984.
