= 1999–2000 Pittsburgh Panthers men's basketball team =

American college basketball season

1999–2000 Pittsburgh Panthers men's basketball
- Conference: Big East Conference (1979–2013)
- Record: 13–15 (5–11 Big East)
- Head coach: Ben Howland (1st season)
- Assistant coaches: Jamie Dixon (1st season); Lennie Parham (1st season); Pat Sandle (1st season)
- Home arena: Fitzgerald Field House (Capacity: 4,122)

1999–2000 Big East men's basketball standings
	Conf.				Overall
Team	W		L	PCT	W		L	PCT
No. 16 Syracuse	13	–	3	.813	26	–	6	.813
No. 23 Miami (FL)	13	–	3	.813	23	–	11	.676
No. 9 St. John's†	12	–	4	.750	25	–	8	.758
No. 20 Connecticut	10	–	6	.625	25	–	10	.714
Seton Hall	10	–	6	.625	22	–	10	.688
Villanova	8	–	8	.500	20	–	13	.606
Notre Dame	8	–	8	.500	22	–	15	.595
West Virginia	6	–	10	.375	14	–	14	.500
Georgetown	6	–	10	.375	19	–	15	.559
Rutgers	6	–	10	.375	15	–	16	.484
Pittsburgh	5	–	11	.313	13	–	15	.464
Providence	4	–	12	.250	11	–	19	.367
Boston College	3	–	13	.188	11	–	19	.367
† 2000 Big East tournament winner As of April 3, 2000; Rankings from AP poll

The 1999–2000 Pittsburgh Panthers men's basketball team represented the University of Pittsburgh in the 1999–2000 NCAA Division I men's basketball season. Led by first year head coach Ben Howland, the Panthers finished with a record of 13–15.
