= Lavor Postell =

American basketball player (born 1978)

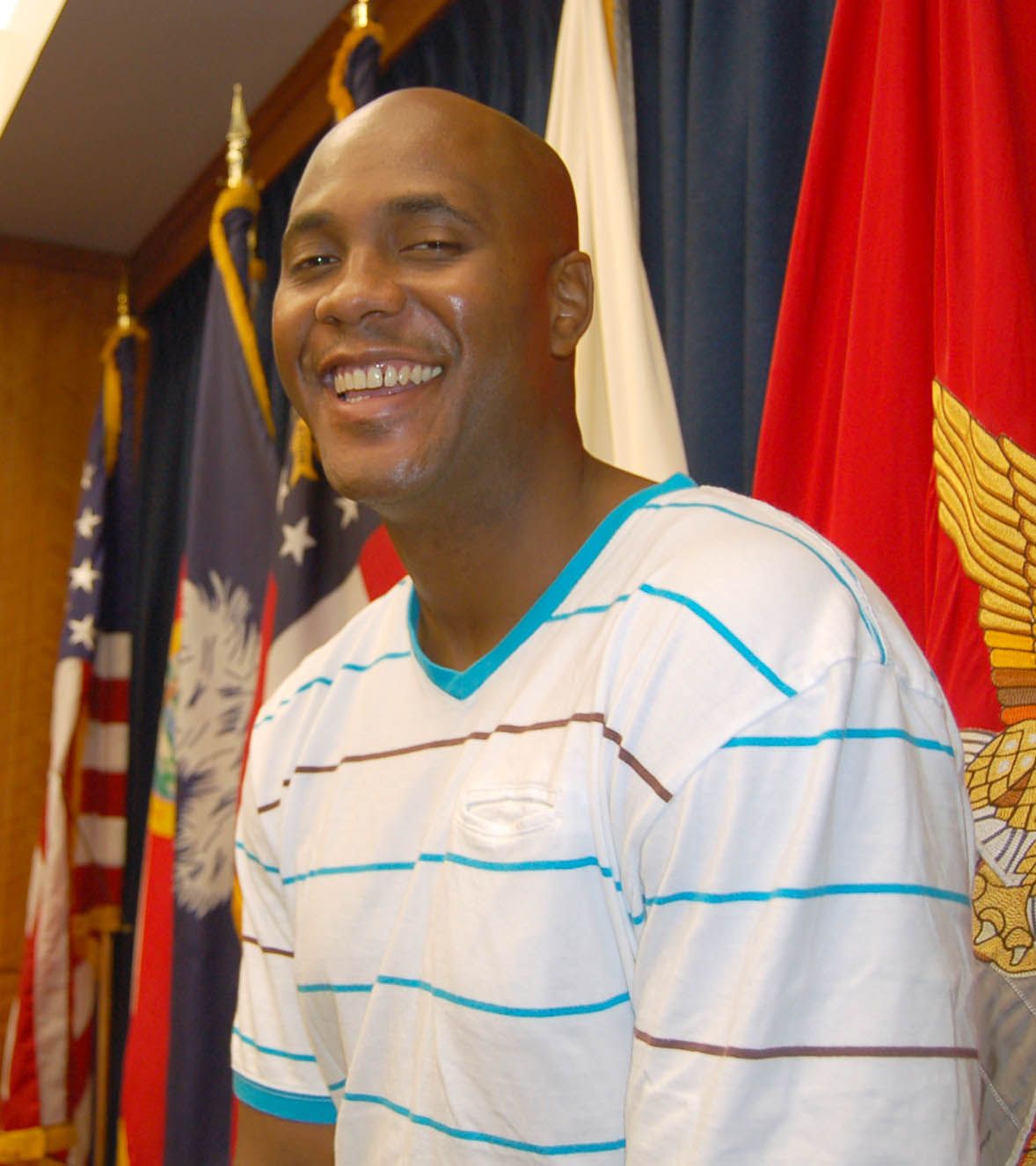

Personal information
- Born: February 26, 1978 (age 48) Albany, Georgia, U.S.
- Listed height: 6 ft 6 in (1.98 m)
- Listed weight: 215 lb (98 kg)

Career information
- High school: Westover (Albany, Georgia)
- College: St. John's (1996–2000)
- NBA draft: 2000: 2nd round, 39th overall pick
- Drafted by: New York Knicks
- Playing career: 2000–2009
- Position: Shooting guard / small forward
- Number: 7, 18

Career history
- 2000–2003: New York Knicks
- 2003–2004: Asheville Altitude
- 2004–2005: Olympiacos
- 2005: Scavolini Pesaro
- 2005–2007: Telindus Oostende
- 2008: Geofin Nový Jičín
- 2009: Panteras de Miranda
- 2009: Búcaros de Bucaramanga

Career highlights
- NBDL champion (2004)
- Stats at NBA.com
- Stats at Basketball Reference

LaVor DeAndre Postell (born February 26, 1978) is an American former professional basketball player. Following a college career at St. John's University, he was selected by the New York Knicks in the second round of the 2000 NBA draft. He played three seasons with the Knicks showing promise when Allan Houston and Latrell Sprewell were sidelined by injuries. During his career, Postell played in 61 games and averaged 3.2 points. His final NBA game was played on April 15, 2003, in a 93–109 loss to the Indiana Pacers where he recorded 4 points and 1 assist. After playing in the NBA, Postell played in Europe and Latin America. At the age of 35, he enlisted in the US Army.

== Career statistics ==
=== NBA statistics ===
Year	Team	GP	GS	MPG	FG%	3P%	FT%	RPG	APG	SPG	BPG	PPG
2000–01	New York	26	0	6.5	.315	.273	.815	1.0	.2	.2	.1	2.3
2001–02	New York	23	0	7.8	.333	.231	.756	.7	.2	.3	.0	4.0
2002–03	New York	12	0	8.2	.368	.286	.867	.3	.3	.2	.0	3.6
Career		61	0	7.3	.335	.250	.795	.7	.2	.2	.0	3.2
