= Bootsy Thornton =

American basketball player (born 1977)

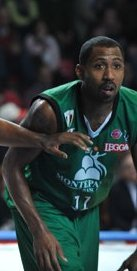
- Thornton playing for Montepaschi Siena (2012)

Personal information
- Born: July 30, 1977 (age 49) Baltimore, Maryland, U.S.
- Listed height: 6 ft 4 in (1.93 m)
- Listed weight: 195 lb (88 kg)

Career information
- High school: Paul Laurence Dunbar (Baltimore, Maryland)
- College: Tallahassee CC (1995–1997); St. John's (1998–2000)
- NBA draft: 2000: undrafted
- Playing career: 2000–2014
- Position: Shooting guard

Career history
- 2000–2003: Oregon Scientific Cantù
- 2003–2005: Montepaschi Siena
- 2005–2006: Winterthur FC Barcelona
- 2006–2007: Akasvayu Girona
- 2007–2008: Montepaschi Siena
- 2008–2011: Efes Pilsen
- 2011–2012: Montepaschi Siena
- 2012–2013: Dinamo Sassari
- 2013–2014: Strasbourg IG

Career highlights
- All-EuroLeague Second Team (2008); 3× Italian League champion (2004, 2008, 2012); Italian Cup winner (2012); 2× Italian Supercup winner (2004, 2007); Turkish League champion (2009); Turkish League Finals MVP (2009); Turkish Cup winner (2009); 2× Turkish President's Cup winner (2009, 2010); FIBA EuroCup champion (2007)

Marvis Linwood "Bootsy" Thornton III (born July 30, 1977) is an American former professional basketball player.

After graduation from St. John's University, where he played for two years, Thornton moved to Italy, where he made a name for himself over the following decade. Thornton spent his most successful years with Montepaschi Siena for which he played on three occasions, winning as many national championship titles and being an All-EuroLeague Second Team selection in 2008.

== High school ==
Thornton played basketball at Paul Laurence Dunbar High School, in Baltimore, Maryland.

== College career ==
Thornton will forever have a place in St. John's Red Storm lore, thanks to his 40-point performance against Duke on January 24, 1999, including seven three-pointers.

== Professional career ==
A highly versatile shooting guard, Thornton earned an All-EuroLeague Second Team selection in the 2007–08 season. On August 8, 2012, Thornton signed with Dinamo Sassari. On December 25, 2013, he signed with Strasbourg IG for the rest of the season.
