= 2000 NCAA Division I men's basketball championship game =

American college basketball final

2000 NCAA tournament championship Game
National championship game
| Florida Gators | Michigan State Spartans |
| SEC | Big Ten |
| (29–7) | (31–7) |
|---|---|
| 76 | 89 |
| Head coach: Billy Donovan | Head coach: Tom Izzo |
- AP: 13
- Coaches: 11
- AP: 2
- Coaches: 2
| | 1st half | 2nd half | Total |
|---|---|---|---|
| Florida Gators | 32 | 44 | 76 |
| Michigan State Spartans | 43 | 46 | 89 |
- Date: April 3, 2000
- Venue: RCA Dome, Indianapolis, Indiana
- MVP: Mateen Cleaves, Michigan State
- Favorite: Michigan State by 4
- Referees: James Burr, Gerald Boudreaux, David Hall
- Attendance: 43,116

United States TV coverage
- Network: CBS
- Announcers: Jim Nantz (play-by-play); Billy Packer (color); Bonnie Bernstein and Armen Keteyian (sideline)

The 2000 NCAA Division I men's basketball championship game was the finals of the 2000 NCAA Division I men's basketball tournament and it determined the national champion for the 1999–2000 NCAA Division I men's basketball season. The game was played on April 3, 2000, at the RCA Dome in Indianapolis, Indiana, and matched No. 1-seeded Michigan State against No. 5-seeded Florida.

The Spartans defeated the Gators, who were appearing in their first championship game, 89–76, earning the Spartans their second national championship. This was the last time a team from the Big Ten won the national championship until rival Michigan did so in 2026.

== Participants ==
=== Florida Gators ===
The Gators were the SEC regular season champions, winning a share of the title with a 12–4 conference record. They earned a No. 5 seed in the NCAA Tournament where they advanced to the Final Four and then made the school's first ever appearance in the NCAA championship game where they lost to Michigan State.

| Round | Opponent | Score |
|---|---|---|
| First Round | No. 12 Butler | 69–68 ^{OT} |
| Second Round | No. 4 Illinois | 93–76 |
| Sweet Sixteen | No. 1 Duke | 87–78 |
| Elite Eight | No. 3 Oklahoma State | 77–65 |
| Final Four | No. 8 North Carolina | 71–59 |
| Championship | No. 1 Michigan State | 76–89 |

=== Michigan State Spartans ===
The Spartans finished the regular season 13–3 to win a share of the Big Ten regular season championship for the third consecutive year. They also won the Big Ten tournament championship for the second consecutive year. As a result of their strong finish in the regular season, the Spartans were awarded the No. 1 seed in the Midwest Region of the NCAA Tournament. From there, the Spartans cruised to their third consecutive Sweet Sixteen with wins over Valparaiso, and Utah. MSU continued their national championship push by reaching their second consecutive Final Four with wins over Syracuse and Iowa State. MSU won every game by double digits despite playing the best possible seed in each round. In their Final Four matchup, Michigan State faced off against Big Ten foe, Wisconsin, beating them in a close game, 53–41.

| Round | Opponent | Score |
|---|---|---|
| First Round | No. 16 Valparaiso | 65–38 |
| Second Round | No. 8 Utah | 73–61 |
| Sweet Sixteen | No. 4 Syracuse | 75–58 |
| Elite Eight | No. 2 Iowa State | 75–64 |
| Final Four | No. 8 Wisconsin | 53–41 |
| Championship | No. 5 Florida | 89–76 |

== Starting lineups ==
| Florida | Position | Michigan State |
|---|---|---|
| Justin Hamilton | G | Charlie Bell |
| Teddy Dupay | G | Mateen Cleaves |
| Brent Wright | F | Andre Hutson |
| Mike Miller | F | Morris Peterson |
| Udonis Haslem | C | A. J. Granger |

== Game summary ==
External videos
- Full game broadcast by CBS on YouTube

Michigan State senior Mateen Cleaves limped his way to the Most Outstanding Player (MOP) of the 2000 NCAA Tournament. Cleaves sprained his ankle with 16:18 to play in the second half, and this was after Florida had trimmed Michigan State's double digit halftime lead to 50–44. Cleaves returned about four minutes later, and immediately helped lead the Spartans on a 16–6 run to put the game out of reach. The lone top-seed remaining would bring order to a tournament filled with upsets as they salted away the victory for the school's second national championship (1979). Michigan State coach Tom Izzo earned his first title in his second straight final four appearance. Morris Peterson led the Spartans with 21 points.
