= 1999–2000 Michigan Wolverines men's basketball team =

American college basketball season

1999–2000 Michigan Wolverines men's basketball

NIT, First Round
- Conference: Big Ten Conference
- Record: 15–14 (6–10 Big Ten)
- Head coach: Brian Ellerbe
- Assistant coaches: Scott Trost; Kurtis Townsend; Lorenzo Neely
- MVPs: LaVell Blanchard; Kevin Gaines
- Captains: Josh Asselin; Darius Taylor; Peter Vignier

1999–2000 Big Ten Conference men's basketball standings
	Conf.				Overall
Team	W		L	PCT	W		L	PCT
No. 2 Michigan State†	13	–	3	.813	32	–	7	.821
No. 25 Purdue	12	–	4	.750	24	–	10	.706
No. 21 Illinois	11	–	5	.688	22	–	10	.688
No. 22 Indiana	10	–	6	.625	20	–	9	.690
Wisconsin	8	–	8	.500	22	–	14	.611
Iowa	6	–	10	.375	14	–	16	.467
Michigan	6	–	10	.375	15	–	14	.517
Penn State	5	–	11	.313	19	–	16	.543
Minnesota	4	–	12	.250	12	–	16	.429
Northwestern	0	–	16	.000	5	–	25	.167
No. 8 Ohio State*	5	–	1	.833	11	–	3	.786
† 2000 Big Ten tournament winner Rankings from AP poll *Ohio State: 14 reg. season games; 2 NCAA Tourn. games vacated due to sanctions against the program Disputed record: Ohio State (23–7) (13–3)

The 1999–2000 Michigan Wolverines men's basketball team represented the University of Michigan in intercollegiate college basketball during the 1999–2000 season. The team played its home games in the Crisler Arena in Ann Arbor, Michigan, and was a member of the Big Ten Conference. Under the direction of head coach Brian Ellerbe, the team finished tied for seventh in the Big Ten Conference. The team earned an eight seed but was defeated in the first round of the 2000 Big Ten Conference men's basketball tournament. The team earned an invitation to the 2000 National Invitation Tournament, where it was eliminated in the first round. The team was unranked for all eighteen weeks of Associated Press Top Twenty-Five Poll, and it also ended the season unranked in the final USA Today/CNN Poll. The team posted a 1–7 record against ranked opponents. Its lone victory occurred on January 7, 2000, against Illinois by a 95–91 margin in overtime at Crisler Arena.

Josh Asselin, Darius Taylor and Peter Vignier served as team captains, and LaVell Blanchard and Kevin Gaines shared team MVP honors. The team's leading scorers were LaVell Blanchard (404 points), Kevin Gaines (339 points) and Jamal Crawford (283 points). The leading rebounders were Blanchard (224), John Asselin (155) and Pete Vignier (114).

The team twice surpassed the school single-game record total of 34 free throws made set on December 9, 1998, when they totaled 37 against Illinois on January 16, 2000, and then with 38 against Iowa on March 1, 2000. The single-game total of 38 continues to be the school record.

In the 2000 Big Ten Conference men's basketball tournament at the United Center from March 9–12, Michigan was seeded eighth. In the first round they lost to number 9 Penn State 76–66.

On March 15, 2000, Michigan lost to Notre Dame 75–65 at the Joyce Center in South Bend, Indiana, in the first round of the 2000 National Invitation Tournament.

== Roster ==
1999–2000 Michigan Wolverines men's basketball team
Players
Coaches

Pos.	#	Name	Height	Weight	Year	Previous school	Hometown
F	50	Leland Anderson	6 ft 8 in (2.03 m)	245 lb (111 kg)	Fr	Attleboro H.S.	Attleboro, Massachusetts
F	25	Josh Asselin (C)	6 ft 11 in (2.11 m)	230 lb (104 kg)	Jr	Caro H.S.	Caro, Michigan
F	30	LaVell Blanchard	6 ft 7 in (2.01 m)	205 lb (93 kg)	Fr	Pioneer	Ann Arbor, Michigan
G	1	Jamal Crawford	6 ft 6 in (1.98 m)	190 lb (86 kg)	Fr	Rainier Beach	Renton, Washington
G	2	Kevin Gaines	6 ft 4 in (1.93 m)	180 lb (82 kg)	Fr	Ed W. Clark	Las Vegas, Nevada
G/F	22	Herb Gibson	6 ft 5 in (1.96 m)	205 lb (93 kg)	So	Harry S Truman	Taylor, Michigan
G/F	23	Gavin Groninger	6 ft 5 in (1.96 m)	190 lb (86 kg)	Fr	Plainfield H.S.	Plainfield, Indiana
G	21	Ramal Hunter	6 ft 3 in (1.91 m)	160 lb (73 kg)	So	Ann Arbor Huron	Ann Arbor, Michigan
G	0	Leon Jones	6 ft 4 in (1.93 m)	195 lb (88 kg)	So	The Winchendon School	Battle Creek, Michigan
F	34	Brandon Smith	6 ft 7 in (2.01 m)	200 lb (91 kg)	Jr	Palo Duro	Amarillo, Texas
F	10	Darius Taylor (C)	6 ft 4 in (1.93 m)	195 lb (88 kg)	Sr	Lake View	Chicago, Illinois
C	55	Peter Vignier (C)	6 ft 11 in (2.11 m)	255 lb (116 kg)	Sr	Teaneck H.S.	Teaneck, New Jersey
F	45	Chris Young	6 ft 9 in (2.06 m)	220 lb (100 kg)	So	Detroit Catholic Central	Plymouth, Michigan

Head coach

- Brian Ellerbe (Rutgers)

Assistant coach(es)

- Lorenzo Neely (Eastern Michigan)
- Kurtis Townsend (Western Kentucky)
- Scott Trost (Illinois State)

Legend

- (C) Team captain
- (S) Suspended
- (I) Ineligible
- (W) Walk-on
- Injured
- Current redshirt

Roster

== Schedule and results ==
Date time, TV	Rank^{#}	Opponent^{#}	Result	Record	High points	High rebounds	High assists	Site city, state
Non–Conference Regular Season
November 19, 1999*		Oakland	W 82–62	1–0	22 – Jones	10 – Asselin	6 – Gaines	Crisler Arena (9,398); Ann Arbor, Michigan
November 23, 1999*		Detroit Mercy	W 66–62	2–0	13 – Crawford	9 – Tied	4 – Crawford	Crisler Arena (9,537); Ann Arbor, Michigan
November 27, 1999*		Western Michigan	W 93–78	3–0	21 – Crawford	7 – Tied	7 – Gaines	Crisler Arena (9,983); Ann Arbor, Michigan
December 1, 1999*; 7:00 pm, ESPN		at Georgia Tech; ACC–Big Ten Challenge	W 80–77	4–0	18 – Tied	13 – Blanchard	8 – Gaines	Alexander Memorial Coliseum (11,423); Atlanta, Georgia
December 4, 1999*		Chattanooga	W 72–61	5–0	21 – Blanchard	12 – Vignier	6 – Crawford	Crisler Arena (11,034); Ann Arbor, Michigan
December 8, 1999*		Kent State	W 75–73	6–0	27 – Crawford	7 – Blanchard	4 – Tied	Crisler Arena (8,723); Ann Arbor, Michigan
December 11, 1999*; 4:00 pm, CBS		No. 14 Duke; Rivalry Game	L 97–104	6–1	27 – Crawford	9 – Blanchard	6 – Tied	Crisler Arena (13,562); Ann Arbor, Michigan
Deceomber 19, 1999*		at Boston College	L 71–89	6–2	25 – Blanchard	10 – Blanchard	4 – Gaines	Silvio O. Conte Forum (7,223); Chestnut Hill, Massachusetts
December 23, 1999*		Duquesne	W 79–67	7–2	16 – Tied	10 – Blanchard	5 – Groninger	Crisler Arena (8,885); Ann Arbor, Michigan
December 28, 1999*		Towson	W 98–84	8–2	23 – Jones	8 – Blanchard	7 – Crawford	Crisler Arena (11,197); Ann Arbor, Michigan
January 2, 2000*		Colorado State	W 87–80	9–2	19 – Asselin	11 – Blanchard	10 – Crawford	Crisler Arena (10,033); Ann Arbor, Michigan
Big Ten Regular Season
January 5, 2000		at Minnesota	L 68–85	9–3 (0–1)	15 – Gaines	11 – Smith	3 – Tied	Williams Arena (13,903); Minneapolis, Minnesota
January 8, 2000		at Purdue	W 88–86 ^{2OT}	10–3 (1–1)	21 – Blanchard	10 – Blanchard	7 – Crawford	Mackey Arena (13,980); West Lafayette, Indiana
January 16, 2000; 1:00 pm, CBS		No. 22 Illinois	W 95–91 ^{OT}	11–3 (2–1)	22 – Blanchard	11 – Blanchard	5 – Smith	Crisler Arena (12,367); Ann Arbor, Michigan
January 19, 2000		Northwestern	W 93–70	12–3 (3–1)	20 – Crawford	7 – Jones	5 – Tied	Crisler Arena (10,150); Ann Arbor, Michigan
January 22, 2000		at Iowa	L 78–83	12–4 (3–2)	22 – Asselin	11 – Asselin	5 – Tied	Carver–Hawkeye Arena (15,500); Iowa City, Iowa
January 25, 2000; 7:00 pm, ESPN		at No. 14 Indiana	L 50–85	12–5 (3–3)	19 – Blanchard	13 – Blanchard	3 – Jones	Simon Skjodt Assembly Hall (17,326); Bloomington, Indiana
February 1, 2000; 7:00 pm, ESPN		No. 8 Michigan State; Rivalry Game	L 62–82	12–6 (3–4)	16 – Blanchard	7 – Blanchard	3 – Gaines	Crisler Arena (13,562); Ann Arbor, Michigan
February 6, 2000; 1:00 pm, CBS		No. 5 Ohio State; Rivalry Game	L 67–88	12–7 (3–5)	21 – Blanchard	9 – Blanchard	6 – Gaines	Crisler Arena (13,562); Ann Arbor, Michigan
February 9, 2000		at Illinois	L 59–75	12–8 (3–6)	15 – Gaines	6 – Blanchard	3 – Gaines	Assembly Hall (15,539); Champaign, Illinois
February 13, 2000; 1:00 pm, CBS		No. 10 Indiana	L 65–86	12–9 (3–7)	23 – Blanchard	12 – Blanchard	7 – Gaines	Crisler Arena (13,562); Ann Arbor, Michigan
February 16, 2000		at Wisconsin	L 59–75	12–10 (3–8)	16 – Gaines	7 – Blanchard	3 – Gaines	Kohl Center (15,680); Madison, Wisconsin
February 19, 2000		Penn State	W 89–87 ^{OT}	13–10 (4–8)	17 – Gaines	11 – Blanchard	6 – Gaines	Crisler Arena (11,522); Ann Arbor, Michigan
February 24, 2000; 7:00 pm, ESPN		No. 21 Purdue	L 75–78	13–11 (4–9)	19 – Groninger	8 – Tied	5 – Gaines	Crisler Arena (10,736); Ann Arbor, Michigan
February 26, 2000		at Northwestern	W 61–55 ^{OT}	14–11 (5–9)	14 – Groninger	9 – Young	5 – Gaines	Welsh–Ryan Arena (5,317); Evanston, Illinois
February 29, 2000		Iowa	W 87–78	15–11 (6–9)	22 – Asselin	9 – Blanchard	3 – Tied	Crisler Arena (9,571); Ann Arbor, Michigan
March 4, 2000; 12:30 pm, ESPN Plus		at No. 7 Michigan State; Rivalry Game	L 63–114	15–12 (6–10)	13 – Asselin	6 – Blanchard	8 – Gaines	Breslin Center (14,659); East Lansing, Michigan
Big Ten Tournament
March 9, 2000*; 2:00 pm, ESPN2	(8)	vs. (9) Penn State; Opening Round	L 66–76	15–13	16 – Vignier	11 – Vignier	4 – Gaines	United Center; Chicago, Illinois
National Invitation Tournament
March 15, 2000*; 9:00 pm, ESPN		at Notre Dame; First Round	L 65–75	15–14	14 – Blanchard	7 – Asselin	5 – Gaines	Joyce Center (6,421); South Bend, Indiana
*Non-conference game. ^{#}Rankings from AP Poll. (#) Tournament seedings in parentheses.

== Team players drafted into the NBA ==
Year	Round	Pick	Player	NBA club
2000	1	8	Jamal Crawford	Cleveland Cavaliers

== See also ==
- Michigan Wolverines men's basketball
- 2000 National Invitation Tournament
- NIT all-time team records
- NIT bids by school and conference
- NIT championships and semifinal appearances
