= 1999–2000 Indiana Hoosiers men's basketball team =

American college basketball season

1999–2000 Indiana Hoosiers men's basketball

NCAA tournament, First Round
- Conference: Big Ten Conference

Ranking
- AP: No. 22
- Record: 20–9 (10–6 Big Ten)
- Head coach: Bobby Knight (29th season)
- Assistant coaches: Mike Davis (3rd season); Pat Knight; John Treloar
- Captain: A.J. Guyton
- Home arena: Assembly Hall

1999–2000 Big Ten Conference men's basketball standings
| | Conf. | | | | Overall |
| Team | W | | L | PCT | W | | L | PCT |
|---|---|---|---|---|---|---|---|---|
| No. 2 Michigan State† | 13 | – | 3 | .813 | 32 | – | 7 | .821 |
| No. 25 Purdue | 12 | – | 4 | .750 | 24 | – | 10 | .706 |
| No. 21 Illinois | 11 | – | 5 | .688 | 22 | – | 10 | .688 |
| No. 22 Indiana | 10 | – | 6 | .625 | 20 | – | 9 | .690 |
| Wisconsin | 8 | – | 8 | .500 | 22 | – | 14 | .611 |
| Iowa | 6 | – | 10 | .375 | 14 | – | 16 | .467 |
| Michigan | 6 | – | 10 | .375 | 15 | – | 14 | .517 |
| Penn State | 5 | – | 11 | .313 | 19 | – | 16 | .543 |
| Minnesota | 4 | – | 12 | .250 | 12 | – | 16 | .429 |
| Northwestern | 0 | – | 16 | .000 | 5 | – | 25 | .167 |
| No. 8 Ohio State* | 5 | – | 1 | .833 | 11 | – | 3 | .786 |
† 2000 Big Ten tournament winner Rankings from AP poll *Ohio State: 14 reg. season games; 2 NCAA Tourn. games vacated due to sanctions against the program Disputed record: Ohio State (23–7) (13–3)

The 1999–2000 Indiana Hoosiers men's basketball team represented Indiana University. Their head coach was Bobby Knight, and this would be his last full season coaching the Hoosiers. The team played its home games in Assembly Hall in Bloomington, Indiana, and was a member of the Big Ten Conference.

The Hoosiers finished the regular season with an overall record of 20–9 and a conference record of 10–6, finishing 4th in the Big Ten Conference. After losing to the Fighting Illini in the quarterfinals of the Big Ten tournament, the Hoosiers were invited to play in the 2000 NCAA tournament. IU lost in the first round to Pepperdine.

== Roster ==
| No. | Name | Position | Ht. | Year | Hometown |
|---|---|---|---|---|---|
| 3 | Tom Coverdale | G | 6–2 | Fr. | Noblesville, Indiana |
| 5 | George Leach | F/C | 6–11 | RS Fr. | Charlotte, North Carolina |
| 11 | Dane Fife | G | 6–4 | So. | Clarkston, Michigan |
| 12 | Luke Jimenez | G | 6–3 | Sr. | Redwood Falls, Minnesota |
| 24 | Michael Lewis | G | 6–1 | Sr. | Jasper, Indiana |
| 25 | A.J. Guyton | G | 6–1 | Sr. | Peoria, Illinois |
| 32 | Kyle Hornsby | G/F | 6–5 | Fr. | Anacoco, Louisiana |
| 33 | Larry Richardson | G | 6–8 | Sr. | Orange Park, Florida |
| 35 | Kirk Haston | F/C | 6–10 | So. | Lobelville, Tennessee |
| 43 | Jarrad Odle | F | 6–8 | So. | Swayzee, Indiana |
| 44 | Lynn Washington | F | 6–8 | Sr. | San Jose, California |
| 50 | Jeff Newton | F | 6–9 | Fr. | Atlanta |
| 53 | Tom Geyer | F | 6–8 | So. | Indianapolis, Indiana |

== Schedule/results ==
| Date time, TV | Rank^{#} | Opponent^{#} | Result | Record | Site city, state |
Regular season
| 11/19/1999* | | at Texas Tech | W 68–60 | 1–0 | United Spirit Arena; Lubbock, Texas |
| 11/26/1999* | | Temple; Hall of Fame Tip Off | W 67–59 | 2–0 | Assembly Hall; Bloomington, Indiana |
| 11/30/1999* | | Notre Dame | W 81–64 | 3–0 | Assembly Hall; Bloomington, Indiana |
| 12/4/1999*; 3:30 pm, CBS | No. 23 | vs. Kentucky; Indiana–Kentucky rivalry | W 83–75 | 4–0 | RCA Dome; Indianapolis |
| 12/7/1999* | No. 15 | at Missouri | W 73–68 | 5–0 | Mizzou Arena; Columbia, Missouri |
| 12/10/1999* | No. 15 | Buffalo; Indiana Classic | W 106–55 | 6–0 | Assembly Hall; Bloomington, Indiana |
| 12/11/1999* | No. 15 | Indiana State; Indiana Classic | L 60–63 | 6–1 | Assembly Hall; Bloomington, Indiana |
| 12/18/1999* | No. 21 | Wyoming | W 99–80 | 7–1 | Assembly Hall; Bloomington, Indiana |
| 12/21/1999* | No. 20 | vs. North Carolina; Jimmy V Classic | W 82–73 | 8–1 | Meadowlands Sports Complex; East Rutherford, New Jersey |
| 12/27/1999* | No. 20 | vs. Canisius; Union Federal Hoosier Classic | W 95–53 | 9–1 | Conseco Fieldhouse; Indianapolis |
| 12/28/1999* | No. 12 | vs. Holy Cross; Union Federal Hoosier Classic | W 79–44 | 10–1 | Conseco Fieldhouse; Indianapolis |
| 1/5/2000 | No. 10 | Wisconsin | W 71–67 | 11–1 (1–0) | Assembly Hall; Bloomington, Indiana |
| 1/8/2000 | No. 10 | at Penn State | W 85–78 | 12–1 (2–0) | Bryce Jordan Center; University Park, Pennsylvania |
| 1/11/2000 | No. 9 | at Michigan State | L 71–77 | 12–2 (2–1) | Breslin Center; East Lansing, Michigan |
| 1/15/2000 | No. 9 | Minnesota | W 86–61 | 13–2 (3–1) | Assembly Hall; Bloomington, Indiana |
| 1/18/2000 | No. 11 | Iowa | W 74–71 | 14–2 (4–1) | Assembly Hall; Bloomington, Indiana |
| 1/22/2000; 2:00 pm, CBS | No. 11 | at Purdue; Rivalry | L 77–83 | 14–3 (4–2) | Mackey Arena; West Lafayette, Indiana |
| 1/25/2000 | No. 14 | Michigan | W 85–50 | 15–3 (5–2) | Assembly Hall; Bloomington, Indiana |
| 2/2/2000 | No. 11 | Penn State | W 87–77 | 16–3 (6–2) | Assembly Hall; Bloomington, Indiana |
| 2/5/2000 | No. 11 | at Northwestern | W 89–67 | 17–3 (7–2) | Welsh-Ryan Arena; Evanston, Illinois |
| 2/9/2000 | No. 10 | at Minnesota | L 75–77 | 17–4 (7–3) | Williams Arena; Minneapolis |
| 2/13/2000; 1:00 pm, CBS | No. 10 | at Michigan | W 86–65 | 18–4 (8–3) | Crisler Arena; Ann Arbor, Michigan |
| 2/19/2000 | No. 10 | Ohio State | L 71–82 | 18–5 (8–4) | Assembly Hall; Bloomington, Indiana |
| 2/22/2000 | No. 16 | at Illinois; Rivalry | L 63–87 | 18–6 (8–5) | Assembly Hall; Champaign, Illinois |
| 2/26/2000; 2:00 pm, CBS | No. 16 | Michigan State | W 81–79 | 19–6 (9–5) | Assembly Hall; Bloomington, Indiana |
| 2/29/2000 | No. 14 | No. 20 Purdue; Rivalry | W 79–65 | 20–6 (10–5) | Assembly Hall; Bloomington, Indiana |
| 3/5/2000; 4:00, CBS | No. 14 | at Wisconsin | L 53–56 | 20–7 (10–6) | Kohl Center; Madison, Wisconsin |
Big Ten tournament
| 3/10/2000 | (5) No. 18 | vs. (4) No. 21 Illinois; Quarterfinals | L 69–72 | 20–8 | United Center; Chicago |
NCAA tournament
| 3/17/2000*; CBS | (6 E) No. 22 | vs. (11 E) Pepperdine; First Round | L 57–77 | 20–9 | HSBC Arena; Buffalo, New York |
*Non-conference game. ^{#}Rankings from AP Poll. (#) Tournament seedings in parentheses.
