= 1999–2000 Ohio State Buckeyes men's basketball team =

American college basketball season

1999–2000 Ohio State Buckeyes men's basketball

NCAA tournament, second round (vacated)
- Conference: Big Ten

Ranking
- Coaches: No. 17
- AP: No. 8
- Record: 11–3 (23–7 unadjusted) (5–1 (13–3 unadjusted) Big Ten)
- Head coach: Jim O'Brien (3rd season)
- Home arena: Value City Arena

1999–2000 Big Ten Conference men's basketball standings
	Conf.				Overall
Team	W		L	PCT	W		L	PCT
No. 2 Michigan State†	13	–	3	.813	32	–	7	.821
No. 25 Purdue	12	–	4	.750	24	–	10	.706
No. 21 Illinois	11	–	5	.688	22	–	10	.688
No. 22 Indiana	10	–	6	.625	20	–	9	.690
Wisconsin	8	–	8	.500	22	–	14	.611
Iowa	6	–	10	.375	14	–	16	.467
Michigan	6	–	10	.375	15	–	14	.517
Penn State	5	–	11	.313	19	–	16	.543
Minnesota	4	–	12	.250	12	–	16	.429
Northwestern	0	–	16	.000	5	–	25	.167
No. 8 Ohio State*	5	–	1	.833	11	–	3	.786
† 2000 Big Ten tournament winner Rankings from AP poll *Ohio State: 14 reg. season games; 2 NCAA Tourn. games vacated due to sanctions against the program Disputed record: Ohio State (23–7) (13–3)

The 1999–2000 Ohio State Buckeyes men's basketball team represented Ohio State University during the 1999–2000 NCAA Division I men's basketball season. Led by third-year head coach Jim O'Brien, the Buckeyes finished 23–7 (13–3 Big Ten) and reached the second round of the NCAA tournament. However, the NCAA adjusted the team's record to 11–3 due to sanctions resulting from the Jim O’Brien scandal.

== Roster ==
1999–2000 Ohio State Buckeyes men's basketball team
Players
Coaches

Pos.	#	Name	Height	Weight	Year	Hometown
G	12	Scoonie Penn	5 ft 11 in (1.8 m)	180 lb (82 kg)	Sr	Salem, Massachusetts
C	32	Ken Johnson	6 ft 11 in (2.11 m)	235 lb (107 kg)	Jr	Detroit, Michigan
G	35	Michael Redd	6 ft 6 in (1.98 m)	200 lb (91 kg)	Jr	Columbus, Ohio

Head coach

- Jim O'Brien (Boston College)

Assistant coach(es)

Legend

- (C) Team captain
- (S) Suspended
- (I) Ineligible
- (W) Walk-on
- Injured
- Current redshirt

== Schedule and results ==
Date time, TV	Rank^{#}	Opponent^{#}	Result	Record	Site city, state
Regular season
Nov 16, 1999*	No. 4	Notre Dame	L 57–59	0–1	Value City Arena; Columbus, Ohio
Nov 29, 1999*	No. 15	Vermont	W 74–51	1–1	Value City Arena; Columbus, Ohio
Dec 4, 1999*	No. 15	Duquesne	W 87–55	2–1	Value City Arena; Columbus, Ohio
Dec 11, 1999*	No. 13	Florida A&M	W 99–47	3–1	Value City Arena; Columbus, Ohio
Dec 13, 1999*	No. 12	Coastal Carolina	W 83–75	4–1	Value City Arena; Columbus, Ohio
Dec 16, 1999*	No. 12	at No. 8 Kansas	L 67–80	4–2	Allen Fieldhouse; Lawrence, Kansas
Dec 19, 1999*	No. 12	Eastern Kentucky	W 72–40	5–2	Value City Arena; Columbus, Ohio
Dec 22, 1999*	No. 16	Toledo	W 64–61	6–2	Value City Arena; Columbus, Ohio
Dec 27, 1999*	No. 15	Oakland	W 76–50	7–2	Value City Arena; Columbus, Ohio
Dec 29, 1999*	No. 15	American	W 79–43	8–2	Value City Arena; Columbus, Ohio
Jan 6, 2000	No. 13	at No. 19 Illinois	L 77–80	8–3 (0–1)	Assembly Hall; Champaign, Illinois
Jan 9, 2000	No. 13	Minnesota	W 71–63	9–3 (1–1)	Value City Arena; Columbus, Ohio
Jan 13, 2000	No. 17	at Wisconsin	W 53–51	10–3 (2–1)	Kohl Center; Madison, Wisconsin
Jan 15, 2000	No. 17	at Northwestern	W 58–44	11–3 (3–1)	Welsh-Ryan Arena; Evanston, Illinois
Jan 20, 2000	No. 13	No. 10 Michigan State	W 78–67	12–3 (4–1)	Value City Arena; Columbus, Ohio
Jan 22, 2000*; CBS	No. 13	at No. 19 St. John's	W 65–64	13–3	Madison Square Garden; New York, New York
Jan 29, 2000	No. 8	Purdue	W 68–59	14–3 (5–1)	Value City Arena; Columbus, Ohio
Feb 2, 2000	No. 5	Wisconsin	W 51–48	15–3 (6–1)	Value City Arena; Columbus, Ohio
Feb 6, 2000; CBS	No. 5	at Michigan	W 88–67	16–3 (7–1)	Crisler Arena; Ann Arbor, Michigan
Feb 9, 2000	No. 5	Iowa	L 64–67	16–4 (7–2)	Value City Arena; Columbus, Ohio
Feb 12, 2000	No. 5	Penn State	W 88–75	17–4 (8–2)	Value City Arena; Columbus, Ohio
Feb 15, 2000	No. 7	at No. 6 Michigan State	L 72–83	17–5 (8–3)	Breslin Student Events Center; East Lansing, Michigan
Feb 19, 2000	No. 7	at No. 10 Indiana	W 82–71	18–5 (9–3)	Assembly Hall; Bloomington, Indiana
Feb 23, 2000	No. 6	Northwestern	W 69–49	19–5 (10–3)	Value City Arena; Columbus, Ohio
Feb 27, 2000	No. 6	Illinois	W 64–51	20–5 (11–3)	Value City Arena; Columbus, Ohio
Mar 1, 2000	No. 6	at Penn State	W 79–73	21–5 (12–3)	Bryce Jordan Center; University Park, Pennsylvania
Mar 4, 2000	No. 6	at Minnesota	W 82–72	22–5 (13–3)	Williams Arena; Minneapolis, Minnesota
Big Ten Tournament
Mar 10, 2000*	No. 4	vs. Penn State; Quarterfinals	L 66–71	22–6	United Center; Chicago, Illinois
NCAA Tournament
Mar 17, 2000*	(3 S) No. 8	vs. (14 S) Appalachian State; First Round	W 87–61	23–6	Gaylord Entertainment Center; Nashville, Tennessee
Mar 19, 2000*	(3 S) No. 8	vs. (6 S) No. 23 Miami (FL); Second Round	L 62–75	23–7	Gaylord Entertainment Center; Nashville, Tennessee
*Non-conference game. ^{#}Rankings from AP. (#) Tournament seedings in parentheses. S=South. All times are in Eastern.

== NBA draft selections ==
Round	Overall	Player	NBA club
2	43	Michael Redd	Milwaukee Bucks
2	57	Scoonie Penn	Atlanta Hawks
