= 1999–2000 Wisconsin Badgers men's basketball team =

American college basketball season

1999–2000 Wisconsin Badgers men's basketball

NCAA tournament, Final Four
- Conference: Big Ten Conference

Ranking
- Coaches: No. 16
- Record: 22–14 (8–8 Big Ten)
- Head coach: Dick Bennett (5th season)
- Assistant coaches: Brad Soderberg; Shawn Hood; Brian Hecker
- Home arena: Kohl Center

1999–2000 Big Ten Conference men's basketball standings
	Conf.				Overall
Team	W		L	PCT	W		L	PCT
No. 2 Michigan State†	13	–	3	.813	32	–	7	.821
No. 25 Purdue	12	–	4	.750	24	–	10	.706
No. 21 Illinois	11	–	5	.688	22	–	10	.688
No. 22 Indiana	10	–	6	.625	20	–	9	.690
Wisconsin	8	–	8	.500	22	–	14	.611
Iowa	6	–	10	.375	14	–	16	.467
Michigan	6	–	10	.375	15	–	14	.517
Penn State	5	–	11	.313	19	–	16	.543
Minnesota	4	–	12	.250	12	–	16	.429
Northwestern	0	–	16	.000	5	–	25	.167
No. 8 Ohio State*	5	–	1	.833	11	–	3	.786
† 2000 Big Ten tournament winner Rankings from AP poll *Ohio State: 14 reg. season games; 2 NCAA Tourn. games vacated due to sanctions against the program Disputed record: Ohio State (23–7) (13–3)

The 1999–2000 Wisconsin Badgers men's basketball team represented University of Wisconsin–Madison in the 1999–2000 NCAA Division I men's basketball season. The head coach was Dick Bennett, coaching his fifth season with the Badgers. The team played its home games at the Kohl Center in Madison, Wisconsin and was a member of the Big Ten Conference. Wisconsin finished the season 22–14, 8–8 in Big Ten play to finish in sixth place. The Badgers received an at-large bid to the NCAA tournament as a No. 8 seed in the West Region. They defeated Fresno State, Arizona, Louisiana State and Purdue en route to the Final Four before losing to Michigan State, 53–41, in Indianapolis.

== Roster ==
1999–2000 Wisconsin Badgers men's basketball team
Players
Coaches

Pos.	#	Name	Height	Weight	Year	Previous school	Hometown
G	2	Travon Davis	5 ft 10 in (1.78 m)	180 lb (82 kg)	So	Nazareth Academy	Summit, Illinois
F	5	Maurice Linton	6 ft 8 in (2.03 m)	215 lb (98 kg)	Jr	Thornwood	Calumet City, Illinois
G	10	Jon Bryant	6 ft 2 in (1.88 m)	185 lb (84 kg)	Sr	Armstrong; St. Cloud State	Plymouth, Minnesota
G	13	Duany Duany	6 ft 5 in (1.96 m)	180 lb (82 kg)	RS Sr	Bloomington North	Bloomington, Indiana
F	15	Andy Kowske	6 ft 8 in (2.03 m)	230 lb (104 kg)	Jr	Dominican	Brookfield, Wisconsin
G	20	Kirk Penney	6 ft 5 in (1.96 m)	205 lb (93 kg)	Fr	Westlake Boys H.S.	Auckland, New Zealand
F	21	Robert Smith (W)	6 ft 8 in (2.03 m)	215 lb (98 kg)	RS Jr	La Follette; UW–Whitewater	Madison, Wisconsin
G	22	Mike Kelley	6 ft 3 in (1.91 m)	185 lb (84 kg)	Jr	Pius XI	Menomonee Falls, Wisconsin
F/C	30	Dave Mader (redshirt)	6 ft 11 in (2.11 m)	240 lb (109 kg)	Fr	Appleton East	Appleton, Wisconsin
G	32	Roy Boone	6 ft 3 in (1.91 m)	190 lb (86 kg)	Jr	Madison East; Coffeyville C.C.	Madison, Wisconsin
F	40	Charlie Wills	6 ft 8 in (2.03 m)	230 lb (104 kg)	RS So	Angola H.S.	Angola, Indiana
F	42	Julian Swartz	6 ft 6 in (1.98 m)	215 lb (98 kg)	Fr	Waukesha South	Waukesha, Wisconsin
F	44	Eric Faust (W)	6 ft 7 in (2.01 m)	215 lb (98 kg)	RS So	Prospect	Arlington Heights, Illinois
F	50	Mark Vershaw	6 ft 9 in (2.06 m)	235 lb (107 kg)	Jr	East Peoria H.S.	East Peoria, Illinois

Head coach

- Dick Bennett (Ripon)

Assistant coach(es)

- Brad Soderberg (Ripon)
- Shawn Hood (Cleveland State)
- Brian Hecker (Indiana)

Legend

- (C) Team captain
- (S) Suspended
- (I) Ineligible
- (W) Walk-on
- Injured
- Current redshirt

Roster
Last update: April 24, 2025

== Schedule and results ==
Date time, TV	Rank^{#}	Opponent^{#}	Result	Record	High points	High rebounds	High assists	Site (attendance) city, state
Non-Conference Regular Season
November 12, 1999*		vs. Missouri; NABC Classic	W 66–55	1–0	19 – Vershaw	5 – Tied	7 – Vershaw	Carrier Dome (16,756); Syracuse, New York
November 13, 1999*		at No. 17 Syracuse; NABC Classic	L 49–68	1–1	13 – Vershaw	5 – Vershaw	5 – Tied	Carrier Dome (16,394); Syracuse, New York
November 20, 1999*		Ball State	W 60–50	2–1	15 – Bryant	8 – Vershaw	4 – Kelley	Kohl Center (14,686); Madison, Wisconsin
November 23, 1999*		at UW–Milwaukee	W 69–49	3–1	12 – Vershaw	10 – Linton	4 – Boone	Klotsche Center (4,323); Milwaukee, Wisconsin
November 30, 1999*; 7:00 pm, ESPN		at Wake Forest; ACC–Big Ten Challenge	L 48–67	3–2	14 – Vershaw	5 – Kowske	3 – Vershaw	Lawrence Joel Veterans Memorial Coliseum (11,245); Winston-Salem, North Carolina
December 3, 1999*		Rhode Island	W 66–43	4–2	18 – Vershaw	11 – Kowske	4 – Vershaw	Kohl Center (15,313); Madison, Wisconsin
December 7, 2000*		No. 10 Texas	W 61–45	5–2	16 – Bryant	9 – Kowske	5 – Kelley	Kohl Center (14,712); Madison, Wisconsin
December 8, 1999*		UW–Green Bay	W 55–34	6–2	13 – Bryant	4 – Tied	8 – Vershaw	Kohl Center (15,735); Madison, Wisconsin
December 11, 1999*; 7:00 pm, ESPN2		at South Florida	L 63–66	6–3	14 – Bryant	4 – Tied	6 – Kelley	Sun Dome (5,003); Tampa, Florida
December 14, 1999*		at Northern Illinois	L 51–55	6–4	19 – Bryant	7 – Tied	2 – Bryant	Chick Evans Field House (5,249); DeKalb, Illinois
December 23, 1999*		Marquette; Rivalry Game	W 86–74	7–4	20 – Kowske	12 – Kowske	5 – Vershaw	Kohl Center (17,142); Madison, Wisconsin
December 29, 1999*		No. 17 Temple	W 62–44	8–4	12 – Bryant	8 – Vershaw	5 – Vershaw	Kohl Center (16,179); Madison, Wisconsin
Big Ten Regular Season
January 5, 2000		at No. 10 Indiana	L 67–71	8–5 (0–1)	17 – Duany	10 – Kowske	5 – Boone	Assembly Hall (15,197); Bloomington, Indiana
January 8, 2000		No. 19 Illinois	W 63–59	9–5 (1–1)	15 – Duany	8 – Kowske	6 – Kelley	Kohl Center (17,142); Madison, Wisconsin
January 13, 2000; 9:00 pm, ESPN		No. 17 Ohio State	L 51–53	9–6 (1–2)	16 – Vershaw	7 – Boone	4 – Vershaw	Kohl Center (15,743); Madison, Wisconsin
January 15, 2000		at Purdue	L 52–63	9–7 (1–3)	17 – Penney	9 – Kowske	3 – Davis	Mackey Arena (14,123); West Lafayette, Indiana
January 19, 2000		at Penn State	L 61–76	9–8 (1–4)	14 – Vershaw	5 – Tied	4 – Tied	Bryce Jordan Center (8,621); University Park, Pennsylvania
January 22, 2000		Minnesota	W 85–53	10–8 (2–4)	16 – Kelley	7 – Kowske	5 – Penney	Kohl Center (17,142); Madison, Wisconsin
January 26, 2000		Purdue	W 55–45	11–8 (3–4)	13 – Vershaw	8 – Kowske	3 – Tied	Kohl Center (15,381); Madison, Wisconsin
January 29, 2000		Iowa	L 55–61	11–9 (3–5)	18 – Vershaw	5 – Penney	2 – Tied	Kohl Center (17,142); Madison, Wisconsin
February 2, 2000		at No. 5 Ohio State	L 48–51	11–10 (3–6)	14 – Kowske	11 – Kowske	3 – Tied	Value City Arena (19,100); Columbus, Ohio
February 5, 2000		at Minnesota	W 66–64	12–10 (4–6)	16 – Tied	4 – Tied	3 – Tied	Williams Arena (14,563); Minneapolis, Minnesota
February 12, 2000; 9:00 pm, ESPN		No. 6 Michigan State	L 44–61	12–11 (4–7)	10 – Linton	7 – Kowske	3 – Boone	Kohl Center (17,142); Madison, Wisconsin
February 16, 2000		Michigan	W 75–59	13–11 (5–7)	17 – Tied	6 – Kowske	3 – Tied	Kohl Center (15,680); Madison, Wisconsin
February 19, 2000; 4:30 pm, ESPN Plus		at No. 6 Michigan State	L 54–59	13–12 (5–8)	11 – Kowske	7 – Kowske	2 – Tied	Breslin Center (14,659); East Lansing, Michigan
February 23, 2000		at Iowa	W 54–45	14–12 (6–8)	13 – Vershaw	7 – Linton	5 – Vershaw	Carver–Hawkeye Arena (15,500); Iowa City, Iowa
March 1, 2000		at Northwestern	W 62–46	15–12 (7–8)	23 – Vershaw	8 – Linton	7 – Kelley	Welsh–Ryan Arena (3,867); Evanston, Illinois
March 5, 2000; 4:00 pm, CBS		No. 14 Indiana	W 56–53	16–12 (8–8)	16 – Linton	10 – Linton	5 – Vershaw	Kohl Center (17,142); Madison, Wisconsin
Big Ten Tournament
March 9, 2000*; 7:10 pm, ESPN Plus	(6)	vs. (11) Northwestern; Opening Round	W 51–41	17–12	17 – Vershaw	9 – Kowske	5 – Vershaw	United Center (17,741); Chicago, Illinois
March 10, 2000*; 10:30 pm, ESPN2	(6)	vs. (3) No. 22 Purdue; Quarterfinals	W 78–66	18–12	22 – Vershaw	8 – Kowske	6 – Vershaw	United Center (19,627); Chicago, Illinois
March 11, 2000*; 5:00 pm, CBS	(6)	vs. (2) No. 5 Michigan State; Semifinals	L 46–55	18–13	11 – Vershaw	7 – Vershaw	6 – Kelley	United Center (22,011); Chicago, Illinois
NCAA Tournament
March 16, 2000*; 10:15 pm, CBS	(8 W)	vs. (9 W) Fresno State; First Round	W 66–56	19–13	21 – Bryant	14 – Kowske	6 – Kelley	Huntsman Center (13,464); Salt Lake City, Utah
March 18, 2000*; 5:45 pm, CBS	(8 W)	vs. (1 W) No. 4 Arizona; Second Round	W 66–59	20–13	15 – Vershaw	12 – Kowske	4 – Tied	Hunstman Center (13,857); Salt Lake City, Utah
March 23, 2000*; 10:30 pm, CBS	(8 W)	vs. (4 W) No. 10 LSU; Sweet Sixteen	W 61–48	21–13	16 – Bryant	5 – Vershaw	5 – Kelley	University Arena (16,004); Albuquerque, New Mexico
March 25, 2000*; 4:30 pm, CBS	(8 W)	vs. (6 W) No. 25 Purdue; Elite Eight	W 64–60	22–13	18 – Bryant	8 – Kowske	6 – Kelley	University Arena (16,004); Albuquerque, New Mexico
April 1, 2000*; 5:42 pm, CBS	(8 W)	vs. (1 MW) No. 2 Michigan State	L 41–53	22–14	18 – Boone	7 – Kelley	3 – Kelley	RCA Dome (43,116); Indianapolis, Indiana
*Non-conference game. ^{#}Rankings from AP Poll. W = West, MW = Mid-West. (#) Tournament seedings in parentheses.

== Records & trivia ==
Tony Bennett was a member of the support staff, officially listed as a team manager in the team's media guide.
