= 1999–2000 Michigan State Spartans men's basketball team =

American college basketball season

1999–2000 Michigan State Spartans men's basketball

NCAA tournament National Champions Big Ten tournament champions Big Ten regular season champions Coca-Cola Spartan Classic champions

National Championship Game, W 89–76 vs. Florida
- Conference: Big Ten Conference

Ranking
- Coaches: No. 1
- AP: No. 2
- Record: 32–7 (13–3 Big Ten)
- Head coach: Tom Izzo (5th season)
- Assistant coaches: Stan Heath (4th season); Mike Garland (4th season); Brian Gregory (1st season)
- Captains: Mateen Cleaves; A. J. Granger; Morris Peterson
- Home arena: Breslin Center

1999–2000 Big Ten Conference men's basketball standings
	Conf.				Overall
Team	W		L	PCT	W		L	PCT
No. 2 Michigan State†	13	–	3	.813	32	–	7	.821
No. 25 Purdue	12	–	4	.750	24	–	10	.706
No. 21 Illinois	11	–	5	.688	22	–	10	.688
No. 22 Indiana	10	–	6	.625	20	–	9	.690
Wisconsin	8	–	8	.500	22	–	14	.611
Iowa	6	–	10	.375	14	–	16	.467
Michigan	6	–	10	.375	15	–	14	.517
Penn State	5	–	11	.313	19	–	16	.543
Minnesota	4	–	12	.250	12	–	16	.429
Northwestern	0	–	16	.000	5	–	25	.167
No. 8 Ohio State*	5	–	1	.833	11	–	3	.786
† 2000 Big Ten tournament winner Rankings from AP poll *Ohio State: 14 reg. season games; 2 NCAA Tourn. games vacated due to sanctions against the program Disputed record: Ohio State (23–7) (13–3)

The 1999–2000 Michigan State Spartans men's basketball team represented Michigan State University in the 1999–2000 NCAA Division I men's basketball season. The team played their home games at Breslin Center in East Lansing, Michigan. They were coached by Tom Izzo, in his fifth year as head coach, and were members of the Big Ten Conference. The Spartans finished the season 32–7, 13–3 to win a share of the Big Ten regular season championship for the third consecutive year. As the No. 2 seed in the Big Ten tournament, they defeated Iowa, Wisconsin, and Illinois to win the tournament championship for the second consecutive year. As a result, they received the conference's automatic bid to the NCAA tournament. As the No. 1 seed in the Midwest region (their second consecutive No. 1 seed), they defeated Valparaiso and Utah to advance to the Sweet Sixteen for the third consecutive year. They then defeated Syracuse and Iowa State to advance to the Final Four for the second consecutive year. After a win in the National Semifinal over fellow Big Ten foe Wisconsin, MSU won the national championship over Florida. The win marked the school's second national championship and Izzo's only championship to date.

== Previous season ==
The Spartans finished the 1998–99 season 33–5, 15–1 to win their second consecutive Big Ten regular season championship. They defeated Northwestern, Wisconsin, and Illinois to win the Big Ten tournament. As a result, they received the conference's automatic bid to the NCAA tournament as the No. 1 seed in the Midwest region, their second consecutive trip to the Tournament. MSU defeated Mount Saint Mary's and Ole Miss to advance to their second straight Sweet Sixteen. In the Sweet Sixteen, they defeated Oklahoma to advance to the school's first Elite Eight since 1979. In the Elite Eight, they defeated Kentucky to earn a trip to the Final Four for the first time since 1979. There they lost No. 1-ranked Duke. The 33 wins marked a school record for wins in a season.

== Season summary ==
=== Non-conference play ===
The Spartans were looking to build on their Final Four appearance the year before with seniors, Mateen Cleaves (12.1 points and 6.9 assist per game) and Morris Peterson (16.8 points and 6.0 rebounds per game), leading the way. MSU began the season ranked No. 3 in the country, but were without starting point guard and team captain, Cleaves, who sustained a stress fracture in his right foot during the offseason.

Without Cleaves, the Spartans began the season with a home win over Toledo before travelling to Puerto Rico for the Puerto Rico Shootout. In Puerto Rico, they defeated Providence and South Carolina to advance to the championship of the tournament. In the championship game, they lost to No. 20 Texas. The Spartans went on to defeat No. 2 North Carolina on the road as part of the inaugural ACC–Big Ten Challenge. MSU returned to East Lansing for easy wins over Howard and Eastern Michigan. A win over No. 5-ranked Kansas in the Great Eight in Chicago followed. A road loss to No. 2 Arizona followed the neutral court win over Kansas. MSU sandwiched home wins over Oakland and Mississippi Valley State around a loss on the road to unranked Kentucky. A shocking loss on the road at Wright State added to the early season struggles and ended the non-conference slate. MSU would enter the Big Ten schedule at 9–4 and ranked No. 11 in the country.

=== Big Ten play ===
Cleaves returned to the Spartans lineup on January 5, 2000, to help the Spartans to wins over Penn State and Iowa. Led by Cleaves the Spartans defeated No. 9 Indiana before losing their first Big Ten game on the road to No. 7 Ohio State. The loss stopped MSU's 21-game conference winning streak dating back to 1999. The Spartans bounced back with wins over Northwestern in back-to-back games, holding Northwestern to 29 points in the second game. A win over Illinois led by Charlie Bell's 20 points led to a matchup against rival Michigan with the Spartans at 15–5, 6–1 on the season. In Ann Arbor, MSU faced the Wolverines as Michigan was without leading scorer Jamal Crawford who was declared ineligible 20 minutes before the game started because of NCAA investigations. Led by Morris Peterson's 32 points and 10 rebounds, MSU had no problems with Michigan, winning by 20. MSU then stepped out of conference for a matchup with No. 7 Connecticut, a fellow participant in the prior year's Final Four. The Spartans easily beat the Huskies, scoring 25 second-chance points and 20 points off Huskie turnovers. MSU returned to the Big Ten to face Purdue in West Lafayette and were upset, falling 70–67. The loss dropped the Spartans to 17–6, 7–2. The Spartans rebounded to beat Wisconsin in Madison before beating No. 7 Ohio State to avenge their earlier loss. A close win over Wisconsin in East Lansing marked their 26th straight win in the Breslin Center and pushed the Spartans to 10–2 in conference. A road win over Penn State preceded an overtime road loss to No. 16 Indiana. MSU returned home and blew out Minnesota 79–43. In the final regular season game of the season, the Spartans faced Michigan again. Cleaves dished out 20 assists as he set the then Big Ten career record for assists in the 114–63 thumping of the Wolverines.

The Spartans finished the conference slate with a 13–3 conference record and 23–7 overall while being ranked No. 2 in the country. MSU earned a share of the Big Ten regular season title with Ohio State, their third consecutive championship.

=== Big Ten tournament ===
The Spartans went on to win the third annual Big Ten tournament as the No. 2 seed, defeating No. 25 Illinois for the championship for the second consecutive year. Cleaves and Peterson were named to the All–Tournament Team and Peterson was named the tournament's Most Outstanding Player.

=== NCAA Tournament ===
As a result of their strong finish, the Spartans were awarded the No. 1 seed, their second consecutive No. 1 seed, in the Midwest region of the NCAA tournament. From there, the Spartans cruised to their third consecutive Sweet Sixteen with wins over Valparaiso, and Utah. MSU continued their national championship push by reaching their second consecutive Final Four with wins over Syracuse and Iowa State. MSU won every game by double digits despite playing the best possible seed in each round. In their Final Four matchup, Michigan State faced off against fellow Big Ten foe, Wisconsin, beating them in a hard-fought game, 53–41.

In the national championship game, the Spartans triumphed over the Florida 89–76, despite losing Cleaves to an ankle injury 3:42 into the second half. Cleaves eventually returned, severely limping and in obvious pain, to lead the Spartans to the championship. Cleaves was subsequently named the tournament's Most Outstanding Player. Joining Cleaves on the NCAA All-Tournament Team were Morris Peterson, Charlie Bell, and A.J. Granger. The national championship was the school's second ever basketball national companionship and first since 1979.

== Roster ==
1999–2000 Michigan State Spartans men's basketball team
Players
Coaches

Pos.	#	Name	Height	Weight	Year	Previous school	Hometown
F	25	Aloysius Anagonye	6 ft 8 in (2.03 m)	250 lb (113 kg)	Fr	St. Martin de Porres	Southfield, Michigan
F	55	Adam Ballinger	6 ft 9 in (2.06 m)	245 lb (111 kg)	RS Fr	Bluffton H.S.	Bluffton, Indiana
G	14	Charlie Bell	6 ft 3 in (1.91 m)	195 lb (88 kg)	Jr	Flint Southwestern	Flint, Michigan
F	20	Mike Chappell	6 ft 9 in (2.06 m)	215 lb (98 kg)	RS Jr	Duke; Lathrup H.S.	Southfield, Michigan
F	22	Steve Cherry	6 ft 6 in (1.98 m)	195 lb (88 kg)	RS Jr	Coldwater H.S.	Coldwater, Michigan
G	12	Mateen Cleaves (C)	6 ft 2 in (1.88 m)	205 lb (93 kg)	Sr	Flint Northern	Flint, Michigan
F	43	A.J. Granger (C)	6 ft 9 in (2.06 m)	230 lb (104 kg)	Sr	Liberty-Benton	Findlay, Ohio
F	34	Andre Hutson	6 ft 8 in (2.03 m)	240 lb (109 kg)	Jr	Trotwood-Madison	Dayton, Ohio
G	15	Mat Ishbia	5 ft 10 in (1.78 m)	155 lb (70 kg)	RS Fr	Seaholm	Birmingham, Michigan
F	42	Morris Peterson (C)	6 ft 7 in (2.01 m)	215 lb (98 kg)	RS Sr	Flint Northwestern	Flint, Michigan
G/F	23	Jason Richardson	6 ft 6 in (1.98 m)	215 lb (98 kg)	Fr	Arthur Hill	Saginaw, Michigan
G	10	Brandon Smith	5 ft 11 in (1.8 m)	180 lb (82 kg)	RS Jr	Pittsford Sutherland	Rochester, New York
G/F	11	David Thomas	6 ft 7 in (2.01 m)	205 lb (93 kg)	RS Jr	Notre Dame Secondary	Brampton, Ontario, Canada

Head coach

- Tom Izzo (Northern Michigan)

Assistant coach(es)

- Stan Heath (Eastern Michigan)
- Mike Garland (Northern Michigan)
- Brian Gregory (Oakland)

Legend

- (C) Team captain
- (S) Suspended
- (I) Ineligible
- (W) Walk-on
- Injured
- Current redshirt

== Schedule and results ==
Date time, TV	Rank^{#}	Opponent^{#}	Result	Record	High points	High rebounds	High assists	Site (attendance) city, state
Exhibition
November 5, 1999*; 7:30 pm		California All-Stars	W 115–66	–	25 – Richardson	10 – Anagonye	6 – Peterson	Breslin Center (15,138); East Lansing, Michigan
November 16, 1999*; 7:30 pm		Mexican All-Stars	W 79–69	–	18 – Peterson	8 – Richardson	7 – Bell	Breslin Center (15,138); East Lansing, Michigan
Non-conference regular season
November 22, 1999*; 7:30 pm	No. 3	Toledo	W 78–33	1–0	19 – Peterson	10 – Tied	5 – Thomas	Breslin Center (15,138); East Lansing, Michigan
November 25, 1999*; 12:00 pm, ESPN2	No. 3	vs. Providence; Puerto Rico Shootout – First Round	W 82–58	2–0	18 – Peterson	7 – Ballinger	8 – Bell	Coliseo Rubén Rodríguez; Bayamón, Puerto Rico
November 26, 1999*; 2:30 pm, ESPN2	No. 3	vs. South Carolina; Puerto Rico Shootout – Semifinals	W 59–56	3–0	21 – Peterson	5 – Granger	3 – Tied	Coliseo Rubén Rodríguez (897); Bayamón, Puerto Rico
November 27, 1999*; 7:00 pm, ESPN2	No. 3	vs. No. 20 Texas; Puerto Rico Shootout – Championship Game	L 74–81	3–1	17 – Hutson	7 – Hutson	4 – Tied	Coliseo Rubén Rodríguez; Bayamón, Puerto Rico
December 1, 1999*; 9:00 pm, ESPN	No. 8	at No. 2 North Carolina; ACC–Big Ten Challenge	W 86–76	4–1	31 – Peterson	10 – Hutson	7 – Thomas	Dean Smith Center (21,572); Chapel Hill, North Carolina
December 3, 1999*; 6:00 pm	No. 8	Howard; Coca-Cola Spartan Classic	W 75–45	5–1	14 – Hutson	10 – Hutson	4 – Tied	Breslin Center (15,138); East Lansing, Michigan
December 4, 1999*; 8:30 pm	No. 8	Eastern Michigan; Coca-Cola Spartan Classic – Championship Game	W 74–57	6–1	16 – Peterson	7 – Richardson	6 – Thomas	Breslin Center (15,138); East Lansing, Michigan
December 7, 1999*; 6:00 pm, ESPN	No. 4	vs. No. 5 Kansas; Great Eight	W 66–54	7–1	21 – Bell	10 – Peterson	4 – Tied	United Center (13,127); Chicago, Illinois
December 11, 1999*; 12:00 pm, CBS	No. 4	at No. 2 Arizona	L 68–79	7–2	20 – Bell	6 – Thomas	4 – Peterson	McKale Center (14,441); Tucson, Arizona
December 18, 1999*; 7:30 pm	No. 5	Oakland	W 86–51	8–2	20 – Bell	7 – Hutson	4 – Thomas	Breslin Center (15,138); East Lansing, Michigan
December 23, 1999*; 7:00 pm, ESPN	No. 5	at Kentucky	L 58–60	8–3	18 – Peterson	9 – Richardson	3 – Bell	Rupp Arena (23,318); Lexington, Kentucky
December 28, 1999*; 7:30 pm	No. 8	Mississippi Valley St.	W 96–63	9–3	22 – Peterson	8 – Peterson	11 – Bell	Breslin Center (15,138); East Lansing, Michigan
December 30, 1999*; 7:00 pm, TWC SportsNet	No. 8	at Wright State	L 49–53	9–4	17 – Granger	7 – Bell	2 – Tied	Nutter Center (9,413); Dayton, Ohio
Big Ten Regular Season
January 5, 2000; 7:00 pm, ESPN+	No. 11	Penn State	W 76–63	10–4 (1–0)	15 – Granger	4 – Tied	5 – Cleaves	Breslin Center (15,138); East Lansing, Michigan
January 8, 2000; 8:00 pm, ESPN+	No. 11	at Iowa	W 75–53	11–4 (2–0)	29 – Peterson	8 – Peterson	7 – Bell	Carver–Hawkeye Arena (15,500); Iowa City, Iowa
January 11, 2000; 7:00 pm, ESPN	No. 11	No. 9 Indiana	W 77–71 ^{OT}	12–4 (3–0)	22 – Bell	8 – Tied	8 – Cleaves	Breslin Center (15,138); East Lansing, Michigan
January 20, 2000; 7:00 pm, ESPN	No. 10	at No. 13 Ohio State	L 67–78	12–5 (3–1)	20 – Peterson	11 – Peterson	7 – Cleaves	Value City Arena (19,100); Columbus, Ohio
January 22, 2000; 12:07 pm, ESPN Regional	No. 10	Northwestern	W 69–45	13–5 (4–1)	14 – Bell	8 – Tied	7 – Cleaves	Breslin Center (14,659); East Lansing, Michigan
January 27, 2000; 8:00 pm, ESPN+	No. 9	at Northwestern	W 59–29	14–5 (5–1)	19 – Peterson	10 – Hutson	9 – Cleaves	Welsh–Ryan Arena (5,907); Evanston, Illinois
January 30, 2000; 1:00 pm, CBS	No. 9	Illinois	W 91–66	15–5 (6–1)	20 – Bell	11 – Hutson	11 – Cleaves	Breslin Center (14,659); East Lansing, Michigan
February 1, 2000; 7:00 pm, ESPN	No. 8	at Michigan; Rivalry Game	W 82–62	16–5 (7–1)	32 – Peterson	10 – Tied	6 – Cleaves	Crisler Arena (13,562); Ann Arbor, Michigan
February 5, 2000*; 1:00 pm, CBS	No. 8	No. 7 Connecticut	W 85–66	17–5	16 – Peterson	8 – Granger	8 – Cleaves	Breslin Center (14,659); East Lansing, Michigan
February 8, 2000; 7:00 pm, ESPN	No. 6	at Purdue	L 67–70	17–6 (7–2)	17 – Granger	12 – Granger	9 – Cleaves	Mackey Arena (14,123); West Lafayette, Indiana
February 12, 2000; 9:00 pm, ESPN	No. 6	at Wisconsin	W 61–44	18–6 (8–2)	18 – Peterson	11 – Granger	4 – Cleaves	Kohl Center (17,142); Madison, Wisconsin
February 15, 2000; 7:00 pm, ESPN	No. 6	No. 7 Ohio State	W 83–72	19–6 (9–2)	26 – Peterson	11 – Peterson	7 – Cleaves	Breslin Center (14,659); East Lansing, Michigan
February 19, 2000; 4:30 pm, ESPN Regional	No. 6	Wisconsin	W 59–54	20–6 (10–2)	15 – Tied	6 – Richardson	6 – Cleaves	Breslin Center (14,659); East Lansing, Michigan
February 23, 2000; 9:00 pm, ESPN+	No. 5	at Penn State	W 79–63	21–6 (11–2)	17 – Peterson	10 – Thomas	10 – Cleaves	Bryce Jordan Center (11,954); University Park, Pennsylvania
February 26, 2000; 2:00 pm, CBS	No. 5	at No. 16 Indiana	L 79–81 ^{OT}	21–7 (11–3)	22 – Cleaves	10 – Peterson	4 – Bell	Assembly Hall (17,412); Bloomington, Indiana
March 2, 2000; 7:00 pm, ESPN	No. 7	Minnesota	W 79–43	22–7 (12–3)	18 – Chappell	12 – Richardson	9 – Cleaves	Breslin Center (14,659); East Lansing, Michigan
March 4, 2000; 12:22 pm, ESPN+	No. 7	Michigan; Rivalry Game / Senior Day	W 114–63	23–7 (13–3)	31 – Bell	10 – Hutson	20 – Cleaves	Breslin Center (14,659); East Lansing, Michigan
Big Ten Tournament
March 10, 2000; 6:40 pm, ESPN Regional	(2) No. 5	vs. (7) Iowa; Quarterfinals	W 75–65	24–7	22 – Peterson	9 – Tied	7 – Cleaves	United Center (19,627); Chicago, Illinois
March 11, 2000; 4:00 pm, CBS	(2) No. 5	vs. (6) Wisconsin; Semifinals	W 55–46	25–7	18 – Peterson	8 – Hutson	7 – Cleaves	United Center (22,011); Chicago, Illinois
March 12, 2000; 2:30 pm, CBS	(2) No. 5	vs. (4) No. 25 Illinois; Championship Game	W 76–61	26–7	17 – Granger	6 – Tied	6 – Tied	United Center (19,663); Chicago, Illinois
NCAA Tournament
March 16, 2000*; 7:40 pm, CBS	(1 MW) No. 2	vs. (16 MW) Valparaiso; First Round	W 65–38	27–7	15 – Cleaves	10 – Richardson	8 – Cleaves	Wolstein Center (13,374); Cleveland, Ohio
March 18, 2000*; 3:30 pm, CBS	(1 MW) No. 2	vs. (8 MW) Utah; Second Round	W 73–61	28–7	21 – Cleaves	8 – Hutson	5 – Cleaves	Wolstein Center (13,374); Cleveland, Ohio
March 23, 2000*; 7:38 pm, CBS	(1 MW) No. 2	vs. (4 MW) No. 16 Syracuse; Sweet Sixteen	W 75–58	29–7	21 – Peterson	6 – Bell	7 – Cleaves	The Palace (21,214); Auburn Hills, Michigan
March 25, 2000*; 7:00 pm, CBS	(1 MW) No. 2	vs. (2 MW) No. 6 Iowa State; Elite Eight	W 75–64	30–7	18 – Tied	11 – Hutson	2 – Tied	The Palace (21,214); Auburn Hills, Michigan
April 1, 2000*; 5:42 pm, CBS	(1 MW) No. 2	vs. (8 W) Wisconsin; Final Four	W 53–41	31–7	20 – Peterson	10 – Hutson	2 – Bell	RCA Dome (43,116); Indianapolis, Indiana
April 3, 2000*; 9:18 pm, CBS	(1 MW) No. 2	vs. (5 E) No. 13 Florida; National Championship Game	W 89–76	32–7	21 – Peterson	9 – Granger	5 – Tied	RCA Dome (43,116); Indianapolis, Indiana
*Non-conference game. ^{#}Rankings from AP Poll. (#) Tournament seedings in parentheses. All times are in Eastern Time. MW = Mid-West, W = West, E = East.

== Player statistics ==
Individual player statistics (Final)
			Minutes		Scoring		Total FGs			3-point FGs			Free-Throws			Rebounds							
Player	GP	GS	Tot	Avg	Pts	Avg	FG	FGA	Pct	3FG	3FA	Pct	FT	FTA	Pct	Off	Def	Tot	Avg	A	Stl	Blk	TO
Anagonye, Aloysius	34	5	463	13.6	99	2.9	35	63	.556	0	0	.000	29	46	.630	52	51	103	3	10	16	20	44
Ballinger, Adam	37	0	382	10.3	73	2.0	29	45	.644	0	0	.000	15	19	.789	18	46	64	1.7	10	8	14	10
Bell, Charlie	39	38	1078	27.6	449	11.5	159	351	.453	38	111	.342	93	116	.802	57	133	190	4.9	124	26	2	76
Chappell, Mike	39	3	563	14.4	230	5.9	75	196	.383	37	117	.316	43	59	.729	31	54	85	2.2	23	5	4	33
Cherry, Steve	12	0	31	2.6	8	0.7	3	11	.273	2	6	.333	0	0	.000	1	1	2	0.2	3	1	0	1
Cleaves, Mateen	26	24	820	31.5	315	12.1	109	259	.421	32	85	.376	65	86	.756	5	41	46	1.8	179	36	4	95
Granger, A.J.	39	35	1128	28.8	370	9.5	127	254	.500	49	109	.450	67	75	.893	53	152	205	5.3	48	17	21	52
Hutson, Andre	39	38	1056	27.1	397	10.2	147	251	.586	0	1	.000	103	154	.669	90	53	243	6.2	57	29	12	74
Ishbia, Mat	18	0	40	2.2	9	0.5	3	5	.600	0	1	.000	3	6	.500	1	3	4	0.2	3	2	0	5
Peterson, Morris	39	38	1136	29.1	657	16.8	218	469	.465	85	200	.425	136	176	.773	79	156	235	6.0	49	46	11	84
Richardson, Jason	37	3	582	15.7	189	5.1	79	157	.503	8	27	.296	23	42	.548	59	94	153	4.1	23	20	6	38
Smith, Brandon	27	0	118	4.4	10	0.4	3	11	.273	1	3	.333	3	9	.333	2	3	5	0.2	22	1	0	14
Thomas, David	34	11	459	13.5	83	2.4	31	76	.408	1	9	.111	20	28	.714	22	60	82	2.4	52	28	5	40
Total	39		7850		2889	74.1	1018	2148	.474	253	669	.378	600	816	.735	521	1000	1521	39.0	602	256	105	569
Opponents	39		7850		2299	58.9	805	2045	.394	206	690	.301	481	704	.683	346	717	1063	27.3	432	219	99	536

Legend
GP	Games played	GS	Games started	Avg	Average per game
FG	Field-goals made	FGA	Field-goal attempts	Off	Offensive rebounds
Def	Defensive rebounds	A	Assists	TO	Turnovers
Blk	Blocks	Stl	Steals

== Rankings ==
Ranking movements Legend: ██ Increase in ranking ██ Decrease in ranking
	Week																		
Poll	Pre	2	3	4	5	6	7	8	9	10	11	12	13	14	15	16	17	18	Final
AP	3	2	3	8	4	5	5	8	11	11	10	9	8	6	6	5	7	5	2

== Awards and honors ==
- Mateen Cleaves – NCAA Tournament Most Outstanding Player
- Mateen Cleaves – All-Big Ten First Team
- Morris Peterson – All-Big Ten First Team
- Morris Peterson – Chicago Tribune Silver Basketball
- Morris Peterson – Big Ten tournament Most Outstanding Player
