= 2000 Big Ten men's basketball tournament =

- Classification: Division I
- Season: 1999–00
- Teams: 11
- Site: United Center; Chicago, Illinois
- Champions: Michigan State Spartans (2nd title)
- Winning coach: Tom Izzo (2nd title)
- MVP: Morris Peterson (Michigan State)
- Television: ESPN Plus, ESPN2, CBS

1999–2000 Big Ten Conference men's basketball standings
	Conf.				Overall
Team	W		L	PCT	W		L	PCT
No. 2 Michigan State†	13	–	3	.813	32	–	7	.821
No. 25 Purdue	12	–	4	.750	24	–	10	.706
No. 21 Illinois	11	–	5	.688	22	–	10	.688
No. 22 Indiana	10	–	6	.625	20	–	9	.690
Wisconsin	8	–	8	.500	22	–	14	.611
Iowa	6	–	10	.375	14	–	16	.467
Michigan	6	–	10	.375	15	–	14	.517
Penn State	5	–	11	.313	19	–	16	.543
Minnesota	4	–	12	.250	12	–	16	.429
Northwestern	0	–	16	.000	5	–	25	.167
No. 8 Ohio State*	5	–	1	.833	11	–	3	.786
† 2000 Big Ten tournament winner Rankings from AP poll *Ohio State: 14 reg. season games; 2 NCAA Tourn. games vacated due to sanctions against the program Disputed record: Ohio State (23–7) (13–3)

The 2000 Big Ten men's basketball tournament was the postseason men's basketball tournament for the Big Ten Conference and was played from March 9 to March 12, 2000, at the United Center in Chicago, Illinois. The championship was won by Michigan State who defeated Illinois for the second consecutive year in the championship game. As a result, Michigan State received the Big Ten's automatic bid to the NCAA tournament.

== Seeds ==
All Big Ten schools played in the tournament. Teams were seeded by conference record, with a tiebreaker system used to seed teams with identical conference records. Seeding for the tournament was determined at the close of the regular conference season. The top five teams received a first round bye.

Seed	School	Conference	1st Tiebreaker	2nd Tiebreaker
1	Ohio State	13–3	1–1 vs MSU	1–0 vs Pur
2	Michigan State	13–3	1–1 vs OSU	0–1 vs Pur
3	Purdue	12–4		
4	Illinois	11–5		
5	Indiana	10–6		
6	Wisconsin	8–8		
7	Iowa	6–10	1–1 vs Mich	1–0 vs OSU
8	Michigan	6–10	1–1 vs Iowa	0–1 vs OSU
9	Penn State	5–11		
10	Minnesota	4–12		
11	Northwestern	0–16		

== Bracket ==
Opening round March 9
8	Michigan	66
9	Penn State	76
7	Iowa	81
10	Minnesota	78
6	Wisconsin	51
11	Northwestern	41

Quarterfinals; March 10
1	#4 Ohio State	66
9	Penn State	71
4	#25 Illinois	72
5	#18 Indiana	69
2	#5 Michigan State	75
7	Iowa	65
3	#22 Purdue	66
6	Wisconsin	78

Semifinals; March 11
9	Penn State	84
4	#25 Illinois	94
2	#5 Michigan State	55
6	Wisconsin	46

Championship; March 12
4	#25 Illinois	61
2	#5 Michigan State	76

== All-Tournament team ==
- Morris Peterson, Michigan State – Big Ten tournament Most Outstanding Player
- Brian Cook, Illinois
- Mateen Cleaves, Michigan State
- Joe Crispin, Penn State
- Jarrett Stephens, Penn State

== Media ==
=== Television ===
Network	Play-by-play announcer	Color analyst(s)	Sideline reporter(s)
ESPN Plus (Northwestern–Wisconsin, opening round; Iowa–Michigan State, quarterfinals); ESPN2 (Wisconsin–Purdue, quarterfinals); CBS (semifinals and championship game)	Wayne Larrivee; Dave Barnett; Jim Nantz	Greg Kelser; Quinn Buckner; Billy Packer	

=== Local Radio ===
Seed	Teams	Flagship station	Play-by-play announcer	Color analyst(s)
2	Michigan State	WJIM–AM/WJIM-FM (Michigan State)	Mark Champion	Gus Ganakas
6	Wisconsin	WIBA–AM/WOLX-FM (Wisconsin)	Matt Lepay	Mike Lucas
