= 1999–2000 Purdue Boilermakers men's basketball team =

American college basketball season

1999–2000 Purdue Boilermakers men's basketball

NCAA tournament, Elite Eight
- Conference: Big Ten Conference

Ranking
- Coaches: No. 15
- AP: No. 25
- Record: 24–10 (12–4 Big Ten)
- Head coach: Gene Keady
- Assistant coaches: Todd Foster; Jay Price; Jim Thrash
- Home arena: Mackey Arena

1999–2000 Big Ten Conference men's basketball standings
	Conf.				Overall
Team	W		L	PCT	W		L	PCT
No. 2 Michigan State†	13	–	3	.813	32	–	7	.821
No. 25 Purdue	12	–	4	.750	24	–	10	.706
No. 21 Illinois	11	–	5	.688	22	–	10	.688
No. 22 Indiana	10	–	6	.625	20	–	9	.690
Wisconsin	8	–	8	.500	22	–	14	.611
Iowa	6	–	10	.375	14	–	16	.467
Michigan	6	–	10	.375	15	–	14	.517
Penn State	5	–	11	.313	19	–	16	.543
Minnesota	4	–	12	.250	12	–	16	.429
Northwestern	0	–	16	.000	5	–	25	.167
No. 8 Ohio State*	5	–	1	.833	11	–	3	.786
† 2000 Big Ten tournament winner Rankings from AP poll *Ohio State: 14 reg. season games; 2 NCAA Tourn. games vacated due to sanctions against the program Disputed record: Ohio State (23–7) (13–3)

The 1999–2000 Purdue Boilermakers men's basketball team represented Purdue University as a member of the Big Ten Conference during the 1999–2000 NCAA Division I men's basketball season. The team was led by Gene Keady and played its home games at Mackey Arena.

== Roster ==
1999–2000 Purdue Boilermakers men's basketball team
Players
Coaches

Pos.	#	Name	Height	Weight	Year	Previous school	Hometown
G	11	Chad Kerkhof	6 ft 1 in (1.85 m)	185 lb (84 kg)	Sr		Greenfield, Indiana
G	12	Maynard Lewis	6 ft 1 in (1.85 m)	187 lb (85 kg)	So		Terre Haute, Indiana
G	20	Kenny Lowe	6 ft 3 in (1.91 m)	197 lb (89 kg)	Fr		Gary, Indiana
C	21	Adam Wetzel	6 ft 9 in (2.06 m)	240 lb (109 kg)	Fr		Keokuk, Iowa
G	22	Jaraan Cornell	6 ft 3 in (1.91 m)	200 lb (91 kg)	Sr	Clay	South Bend, Indiana
F	23	Mike Robinson	6 ft 6 in (1.98 m)	210 lb (95 kg)	Sr	Richwoods	Peoria, Illinois
G	31	Rodney Smith	6 ft 6 in (1.98 m)	231 lb (105 kg)	So		Indianapolis, Indiana
C	32	Greg McQuay	6 ft 7 in (2.01 m)	215 lb (98 kg)	Sr		Gary, Indiana
F	35	Brian Cardinal	6 ft 8 in (2.03 m)	240 lb (109 kg)	Sr	Unity	Tolono, Illinois
G	43	Carson Cunningham	6 ft 1 in (1.85 m)	188 lb (85 kg)	Jr	Oregon State	Ogden Dunes, Indiana
C	54	John Allison	6 ft 10 in (2.08 m)	242 lb (110 kg)	So		New Palestine, Indiana

Head coach

- Gene Keady (Kansas State)

Assistant coach(es)

- Todd Foster (Purdue)
- Jay Price (Kansas)
- Jim Thrash (Eastern New Mexico)

Legend

- (C) Team captain
- (S) Suspended
- (I) Ineligible
- (W) Walk-on
- Injured
- Current redshirt

== Schedule and results ==
Date time, TV	Rank^{#}	Opponent^{#}	Result	Record	Site city, state
Exhibition
Nov 3, 1999*; 8:00 PM	No. 23	Athletes in Action	W 105–90	–	Mackey Arena; West Lafayette, Indiana
Nov 14, 1999*; 4:00 PM	No. 23	CIMEBA All-Stars	W 80–61	–	Mackey Arena; West Lafayette, Indiana
Regular season
Nov 22, 1999*; 2:00 PM	No. 22	at Chaminade; Maui Invitational Tournament	W 96–78	1–0	Lahaina Civic Center; Lahaina, Hawaii
Nov 23, 1999*; 5:00 PM	No. 22	vs. No. 6 Florida; Maui Invitational Tournament	W 79–68	2–0	Lahaina Civic Center; Lahaina, Hawaii
Nov 24, 1999*	No. 22	vs. No. 4 North Carolina; Maui Invitational Tournament	L 75–90	2–1	Lahaina Civic Center; Lahaina, Hawaii
Dec 1, 1999*; 7:30 PM	No. 19	NC State; ACC–Big Ten Challenge	L 59–61	2–2	Mackey Arena; West Lafayette, Indiana
Dec 4, 1999*; 6:00 PM	No. 19	Akron	W 75–66	3–2	Mackey Arena; West Lafayette, Indiana
Dec 7, 1999*; 8:00 PM	No. 25	at Illinois State	W 86–75	4–2	Redbird Arena; Normal, Illinois
Dec 9, 1999*; 8:00 PM	No. 25	Western Illinois	W 83–48	5–2	Mackey Arena; West Lafayette, Indiana
Dec 11, 1999*; 4:00 PM	No. 25	Coppin State	W 86–65	6–2	Mackey Arena; West Lafayette, Indiana
Dec 18, 1999*; 7:00 PM	No. 24	vs. Ball State; Boilermaker Blockbuster	L 52–72	6–3	Conseco Fieldhouse; Indianapolis, Indiana
Dec 22, 1999*; 8:00 PM		Central Michigan	W 92–61	7–3	Mackey Arena; West Lafayette, Indiana
Dec 27, 1999*; 10:30 PM		at Santa Clara	W 70–55	8–3	Toso Pavilion; Santa Clara, California
Dec 30, 1999*; 10:30 PM		at UCLA	L 53–55	8–4	Pauley Pavilion; Los Angeles, California
Jan 3, 2000*; 8:00 PM		Murray State	W 95–67	9–4	Mackey Arena; West Lafayette, Indiana
Jan 8, 2000; 2:31 PM		Michigan	L 86–88 ^{2OT}	9–5 (0–1)	Mackey Arena; West Lafayette, Indiana
Jan 12, 2000; 8:00 PM		at No. 22 Illinois	W 69–66	10–5 (1–1)	Assembly Hall; Champaign, Illinois
Jan 15, 2000; 2:31 PM		Wisconsin	W 63–52	11–5 (2–1)	Mackey Arena; West Lafayette, Indiana
Jan 19, 2000; 8:00 PM		at Minnesota	W 74–69	12–5 (3–1)	Williams Arena; Minneapolis, Minnesota
Jan 22, 2000; 2:00 PM		No. 11 Indiana; Rivalry	W 83–77	13–5 (4–1)	Mackey Arena; West Lafayette, Indiana
Jan 26, 2000; 8:00 PM		at Wisconsin	L 45–55	13–6 (4–2)	Kohl Center; Madison, Wisconsin
Jan 29, 2000; 8:00 PM		at No. 8 Ohio State	L 59–68	13–7 (4–3)	Value City Arena; Columbus, Ohio
Feb 2, 2000; 6:00 PM		Northwestern	W 70–51	14–7 (5–3)	Mackey Arena; West Lafayette, Indiana
Feb 5, 2000; 8:00 PM		at Iowa	W 84–58	15–7 (6–3)	Carver-Hawkeye Arena; Iowa City, Iowa
Feb 8, 2000; 7:00 PM		No. 6 Michigan State	W 70–67	16–7 (7–3)	Mackey Arena; West Lafayette, Indiana
Feb 12, 2000; 2:31 PM		at Northwestern	W 77–58	17–7 (8–3)	Welsh-Ryan Arena; Evanston, Illinois
Feb 16, 2000; 8:00 PM	No. 25	Iowa	W 67–59	18–7 (9–3)	Mackey Arena; West Lafayette, Indiana
Feb 19, 2000; 2:31 PM	No. 25	Minnesota	W 97–61	19–7 (10–3)	Mackey Arena; West Lafayette, Indiana
Feb 24, 2000; 7:00 PM	No. 21	at Michigan	W 78–75	20–7 (11–3)	Crisler Arena; Ann Arbor, Michigan
Feb 27, 2000; 12:07 PM	No. 21	Penn State	W 88–71	21–7 (12–3)	Mackey Arena; West Lafayette, Indiana
Feb 29, 2000; 7:00 PM	No. 20	at No. 14 Indiana; Rivalry	L 65–79	21–8 (12–4)	Assembly Hall; Bloomington, Indiana
Big Ten Tournament
Mar 10, 2000*; 9:00 PM	(3) No. 22	vs. (6) Wisconsin; Quarterfinals	L 66–78	21–9	United Center; Chicago, Illinois
NCAA tournament
Mar 16, 2000*; 3:00 PM	(6 W) No. 22	vs. (11 W) Dayton; First Round	W 62–61	22–9	McKale Center; Tucson, Arizona
Mar 18, 2000*; 5:30 PM	(6 W) No. 22	vs. (3 W) No. 12 Oklahoma; Second Round	W 66–62	23–9	McKale Center; Tucson, Arizona
Mar 23, 2000*; 7:55 PM	(6 W) No. 22	vs. (10 W) Gonzaga; West Regional semifinal – Sweet Sixteen	W 75–66	24–9	The Pit; Albuquerque, New Mexico
Mar 25, 2000*; 4:40 PM	(6 W) No. 22	vs. (8 W) Wisconsin; West Regional Final – Elite Eight	L 60–64	24–10	The Pit; Albuquerque, New Mexico
*Non-conference game. ^{#}Rankings from AP Poll. (#) Tournament seedings in parentheses. W=West. All times are in Eastern.

=== NCAA basketball tournament ===
During the 2000 NCAA Division I men's basketball tournament, Purdue qualified for the Elite Eight, where they lost to the Wisconsin Badgers.

- West
  - Purdue (#6 seed) 62, Dayton (#11 seed) 61
  - Purdue 66, Oklahoma (#3 seed) 62
  - Purdue 75, Gonzaga (#10 seed) 66
  - Wisconsin (#8 seed) 64, Purdue 60

== Team players drafted into the NBA ==
Round	Pick	Player	NBA club
2	44	Brian Cardinal	Detroit Pistons
