= 1999–2000 Iowa Hawkeyes men's basketball team =

American college basketball season

1999–00 Iowa Hawkeyes men's basketball

Hawkeye Challenge champion
- Conference: Big Ten Conference
- Record: 14–16 (6–10 Big Ten)
- Head coach: Steve Alford (1st season)
- Assistant coaches: Brian Jones; Greg Lansing
- MVPs: Jacob Jaacks; Dean Oliver
- Home arena: Carver–Hawkeye Arena

1999–2000 Big Ten Conference men's basketball standings
	Conf.				Overall
Team	W		L	PCT	W		L	PCT
No. 2 Michigan State†	13	–	3	.813	32	–	7	.821
No. 25 Purdue	12	–	4	.750	24	–	10	.706
No. 21 Illinois	11	–	5	.688	22	–	10	.688
No. 22 Indiana	10	–	6	.625	20	–	9	.690
Wisconsin	8	–	8	.500	22	–	14	.611
Iowa	6	–	10	.375	14	–	16	.467
Michigan	6	–	10	.375	15	–	14	.517
Penn State	5	–	11	.313	19	–	16	.543
Minnesota	4	–	12	.250	12	–	16	.429
Northwestern	0	–	16	.000	5	–	25	.167
No. 8 Ohio State*	5	–	1	.833	11	–	3	.786
† 2000 Big Ten tournament winner Rankings from AP poll *Ohio State: 14 reg. season games; 2 NCAA Tourn. games vacated due to sanctions against the program Disputed record: Ohio State (23–7) (13–3)

The 1999–2000 Iowa Hawkeyes men's basketball team represented the University of Iowa as members of the Big Ten Conference during the 1999–2000 NCAA Division I men's basketball season. The team was led by first-year head coach Steve Alford and played their home games at Carver–Hawkeye Arena. They finished the season 14–16 overall and 6–10 in Big Ten play.

== Roster ==
1999–2000 Iowa Hawkeyes men's basketball team
Players
Coaches

Pos.	#	Name	Height	Weight	Year	Hometown
F	1	Rob Griffin	6 ft 6 in (1.98 m)	—	Jr	Belleville, Michigan
G	11	Jason Price	6 ft 0 in (1.83 m)	—	Jr	Chicago, Illinois
F	13	Joe Fermino	6 ft 7 in (2.01 m)	—	Jr	Essex, Maryland
C	14	Jacob Jaacks	6 ft 10 in (2.08 m)	—	Sr	Cedar Rapids, Iowa
G	20	Dean Oliver	5 ft 11 in (1.8 m)	—	Jr	Mason City, Iowa
F	23	Duez Henderson	6 ft 7 in (2.01 m)	—	So	Detroit, Michigan
G	24	Ryan Luehrsmann	5 ft 11 in (1.8 m)	—	Sr	Cedar Rapids, Iowa
F	25	Rod Thompson	6 ft 6 in (1.98 m)	—	So	Galesburg, Illinois
G	30	Kyle Galloway	6 ft 6 in (1.98 m)	190 lb (86 kg)	RS So	Sioux City, Iowa
C	45	John Carl Williams	6 ft 8 in (2.03 m)	275 lb (125 kg)	RS So	Wauwatosa, Wisconsin

Head coach

- Steve Alford (Indiana)

Assistant coach(es)

- Brian Jones (Northern Iowa)
- Greg Lansing (South Dakota)

Legend

- (C) Team captain
- (S) Suspended
- (I) Ineligible
- (W) Walk-on
- Injured
- Current redshirt

== Schedule/Results ==
Date time, TV	Rank^{#}	Opponent^{#}	Result	Record	Site city, state
Non-conference regular season
11/11/1999*; ESPN2		vs. No. 1 Connecticut; Coaches vs. Cancer Classic	W 70–68	1–0	Madison Square Garden (19,548); New York, NY
11/12/1999*		vs. No. 13 Stanford; Coaches vs. Cancer Classic	L 58–72	1–1	Madison Square Garden; New York, NY
11/21/1999*	No. 22	Eastern Illinois	W 95–79	2–1	Carver-Hawkeye Arena; Iowa City, IA
11/27/1999*	No. 23	at Creighton	L 76–85	2–2	Omaha Civic Auditorium; Omaha, NE
11/30/1999*; ESPN2		at No. 24 Maryland; ACC – Big Ten Challenge	L 65–83	2–3	Baltimore Arena (12,310); Baltimore, MD
12/3/1999*		Texas Southern; Hawkeye Challenge	W 73–51	3–3	Carver-Hawkeye Arena; Iowa City, IA
12/4/1999*		Ohio; Hawkeye Challenge	W 86–66	4–3	Carver-Hawkeye Arena; Iowa City, IA
12/7/1999*		at Northern Iowa; Iowa Big Four	W 67–59	5–3	UNI-Dome; Cedar Falls, IA
12/11/1999*		at Iowa State; Rivalry	L 66–79	5–4	Hilton Coliseum; Ames, IA
12/18/1999*		at Missouri	L 61–72	5–5	Hearnes Center; Columbia, MO
12/28/1999*		Drake; Iowa Big Four	W 83–76 ^{2OT}	6–5	Carver-Hawkeye Arena; Iowa City, IA
Big Ten Regular Season
1/5/2000		Northwestern	W 58–52	7–5 (1–0)	Carver-Hawkeye Arena; Iowa City, IA
1/8/2000; ESPN Plus		No. 11 Michigan State	L 53–75	7–6 (1–1)	Carver-Hawkeye Arena; Iowa City, IA
1/12/2000		at Minnesota	L 82–85	7–7 (1–2)	Williams Arena; Minneapolis, MN
1/15/2000		at Penn State	L 61–73	7–8 (1–3)	Bryce Jordan Center; University Park, PA
1/18/2000		at No. 11 Indiana	L 71–74	7-9 (1–4)	Assembly Hall (17,348); Bloomington, IN
1/22/2000		Michigan	W 83–78	8–9 (2–4)	Carver-Hawkeye Arena; Iowa City, IA
1/26/2000		Illinois	L 58–69	8–10 (2–5)	Carver-Hawkeye Arena; Iowa City, IA
1/29/2000		at Wisconsin	W 61–55	9–10 (3–5)	Kohl Center; Madison, WI
2/3/2000*		No. 15 Kansas	W 77–69	10–10 (3–5)	Carver-Hawkeye Arena; Iowa City, IA
2/5/2000		Purdue	L 58–84	10–11 (3–6)	Carver-Hawkeye Arena; Iowa City, IA
2/9/2000		at No. 5 Ohio State	W 67–64	11–11 (4–6)	Value City Arena (19,100); Columbus, OH
2/12/2000		at Illinois	L 50–78	11–12 (4–7)	Assembly Hall; Champaign, IL
2/16/2000		at No. 25 Purdue	L 59–67	11–13 (4–8)	Mackey Arena; West Lafayette, IN
2/23/2000		Wisconsin	L 45–54	11–14 (4–9)	Carver-Hawkeye Arena; Iowa City, IA
2/27/2000		Minnesota	W 71–59	12–14 (5–9)	Carver-Hawkeye Arena; Iowa City, IA
2/29/2000		at Michigan	L 78–87	12–15 (5–10)	Crisler Arena; Ann Arbor, MI
3/4/2000		Penn State	W 86–83	13–15 (6–10)	Carver-Hawkeye Arena; Iowa City, IA
Big Ten tournament
3/9/2000		vs. Minnesota; First Round	W 81–78	14–15	United Center; Chicago, IL
3/10/2000		vs. No. 5 Michigan State; Quarterfinals	L 65–75	14–16	United Center; Chicago, IL
*Non-conference game. ^{#}Rankings from AP Poll. (#) Tournament seedings in parentheses.
