= 1999–2000 Illinois Fighting Illini men's basketball team =

American college basketball season

1999–2000 Illinois Fighting Illini men's basketball

NCAA tournament, second round
- Conference: Big Ten Conference

Ranking
- AP: No. 21
- Record: 22–10 (11–5 Big Ten)
- Head coach: Lon Kruger (4th season)
- Assistant coaches: Robert McCullum (4th season); Rob Judson (4th season); Steve Henson (3rd season)
- MVP: Cory Bradford
- Captain: Victor Chukwudebe
- Home arena: Assembly Hall

1999–2000 Big Ten Conference men's basketball standings
	Conf.				Overall
Team	W		L	PCT	W		L	PCT
No. 2 Michigan State†	13	–	3	.813	32	–	7	.821
No. 25 Purdue	12	–	4	.750	24	–	10	.706
No. 21 Illinois	11	–	5	.688	22	–	10	.688
No. 22 Indiana	10	–	6	.625	20	–	9	.690
Wisconsin	8	–	8	.500	22	–	14	.611
Iowa	6	–	10	.375	14	–	16	.467
Michigan	6	–	10	.375	15	–	14	.517
Penn State	5	–	11	.313	19	–	16	.543
Minnesota	4	–	12	.250	12	–	16	.429
Northwestern	0	–	16	.000	5	–	25	.167
No. 8 Ohio State*	5	–	1	.833	11	–	3	.786
† 2000 Big Ten tournament winner Rankings from AP poll *Ohio State: 14 reg. season games; 2 NCAA Tourn. games vacated due to sanctions against the program Disputed record: Ohio State (23–7) (13–3)

The 1999–2000 Illinois Fighting Illini men's basketball team represented the University of Illinois.

== Regular season ==
In 2000, for the third time in four seasons, Illinois advanced to the NCAA tournament, this time as a #4 seed. After defeating Penn in the opening round, the Illini season ended with a defeat to eventual national runner-up Florida. The Fighting Illini spent much of the season ranked in the Top 25, climbing as high as No. 15 in late December. An early three-game losing streak in Big Ten play put the Illini in a hole to start league play at 1–3. But, Illinois went on to win 10 of the last 12 league games before finishing second in the Big Ten tournament. During the February 19th game vs. Northwestern, the Illini would set an NCAA record fewest points allowed in the first half of a game by giving up only 6 points. Cory Bradford earned second-team All-Big Ten honors after leading Illinois in scoring and the Big Ten in three-point field goals. Forward Brian Cook was named Co-Freshman of the Year in the conference and earned All-Tournament honors with strong play in the Big Ten tournament.

=== Roster ===
1999–2000 Illinois Fighting Illini men's basketball team
Players
Coaches

Pos.	#	Name	Height	Weight	Year	Previous school	Hometown
F	00	Victor Chukwudebe (C)	6 ft 7 in (2.01 m)	230 lb (104 kg)	Sr	Lanphier High School	Springfield, Illinois
G	3	Gareth Breunlin (redshirt)	6 ft 0 in (1.83 m)	180 lb (82 kg)	Fr	Lyons Township High School	La Grange, Illinois
G	5	Nate Mast	5 ft 11 in (1.8 m)	160 lb (73 kg)	Jr	Champaign Central High School	Champaign, Illinois
G	12	Joe Cross	6 ft 2 in (1.88 m)	205 lb (93 kg)	Jr	Carbondale Community High School	Carbondale, Illinois
G	13	Cory Bradford	6 ft 3 in (1.91 m)	200 lb (91 kg)	RS So	Raleigh Egypt High School	Memphis, Tennessee
F/C	21	Robert Archibald	6 ft 11 in (2.11 m)	230 lb (104 kg)	So	Lafayette High School	Ballwin, Missouri
F	22	Lucas Johnson	6 ft 8 in (2.03 m)	215 lb (98 kg)	So	Maine West High School	Des Plaines, Illinois
G	24	Sean Harrington	6 ft 3 in (1.91 m)	185 lb (84 kg)	Fr	Elgin High School	Bartlett, Illinois
G	25	Jerrance Howard (redshirt)	6 ft 1 in (1.85 m)	180 lb (82 kg)	Fr	Peoria High School	Peoria, Illinois
G	30	Frank Williams	6 ft 3 in (1.91 m)	200 lb (91 kg)	RS Fr	Manual High School	Peoria, Illinois
F	32	Cleotis Brown	6 ft 5 in (1.96 m)	220 lb (100 kg)	Sr	Russell County High School	Pittsview, Alabama
F	33	Damir Krupalija	6 ft 9 in (2.06 m)	215 lb (98 kg)	So	Rockford Boylan High School	Rockford, Illinois
F	34	Brian Cook	6 ft 10 in (2.08 m)	220 lb (100 kg)	Fr	Lincoln Community High School	Lincoln, Illinois
F	40	Sergio McClain	6 ft 4 in (1.93 m)	220 lb (100 kg)	Jr	Manual High School	Peoria, Illinois
F	42	Clayton Thomas (W)	6 ft 6 in (1.98 m)	210 lb (95 kg)	Fr	Larkin High School	Elgin, Illinois
F	52	Marcus Griffin	6 ft 9 in (2.06 m)	235 lb (107 kg)	Jr	Manual High School/Lincoln College	Peoria, Illinois

Head coach

- Lon Kruger (Kansas State) (4th year)

Assistant coach(es)

- Rob Judson (University of Illinois) (4th year)
- Robert McCullum (Seminole State) (4th year)
- Steve Henson (Kansas State) (3rd year)

Legend

- (C) Team captain
- (S) Suspended
- (I) Ineligible
- (W) Walk-on
- Injured
- Current redshirt

Roster

== Schedule ==
Date time, TV	Rank^{#}	Opponent^{#}	Result	Record	Site (attendance) city, state
Non-Conference regular season
11/19/1999*; ESPN+	No. 17	Western Illinois	W 76–53	1–0	Assembly Hall (14,421); Champaign, IL
11/22/1999*; MVCN	No. 15	at Bradley	W 72–62	2–0	Carver Arena (11,430); Peoria, IL
11/30/1999*; ESPN	No. 16	vs. No. 17 Duke; Big Ten-ACC Challenge	L 69–72	2–1	United Center (20,143); Chicago, IL
12/4/1999*; MASN	No. 16	vs. Maryland; BB&T Classic Basketball Tournament	L 67–69	2–2	Verizon Center (13,536); Washington, D.C.
12/5/1999*	No. 16	vs. Seton Hall; BB&T Classic Basketball Tournament	W 72–61	3–2	Verizon Center (13,703); Washington, D.C.
12/8/1999*		Texas-Pan American	W 98–61	4–2	Assembly Hall (11,705); Champaign, IL
12/11/1999*; ESPN2	No. 22	Kansas State	W 81–48	5–2	Assembly Hall (14,022); Champaign, IL
12/18/1999*; ESPN	No. 20	vs. No. 8 Kansas	W 84–70	6–2	United Center (16,714); Chicago, IL
12/21/1999*; ESPN+	No. 15	vs. Missouri; Braggin' Rights	L 72–78	6–3	Scottrade Center (22,484); St. Louis, MO
12/28/1999*	No. 20	Bethune-Cookman	W 97–47	7–3	Assembly Hall (12,070); Champaign, IL
12/30/1999*	No. 20	Loyola (Chicago)	W 107–71	8–3	Assembly Hall (12,462); Champaign, IL
Big Ten regular season
1/6/2000; ESPN	No. 19	No. 13 Ohio State	W 80–77	9–3 (1–0)	Assembly Hall (13,756); Champaign, IL
1/8/2000; Raycom	No. 19	at Wisconsin	L 59–63	9–4 (1–1)	Kohl Center (17,142); Madison, WI
1/12/2000; ESPN2	No. 22	Purdue	L 66–69	9–5 (1–2)	Assembly Hall (15,473); Champaign, IL
1/16/2000; CBS	No. 22	at Michigan	L 91–95 ^{ot}	9–6 (1–3)	Crisler Arena (11,367); Ann Arbor, MI
1/22/2000; ESPN+		Penn State	W 87–76	10–6 (2–3)	Assembly Hall (16,038); Champaign, IL
1/26/2000; ESPN+		at Iowa; Rivalry	W 69–58	11–6 (3–3)	Carver–Hawkeye Arena (15,500); Iowa City, IA
1/30/2000; CBS		at No. 9 Michigan State	L 66–91	11–7 (3–4)	Breslin Student Events Center (14,659); East Lansing, MI
2/2/2000; ESPN+		Minnesota	W 73–59	12–7 (4–4)	Assembly Hall (12,977); Champaign, IL
2/6/2000; ESPN+		at Penn State	W 51–50	13–7 (5–4)	Bryce Jordan Center (13,001); University Park, PA
2/9/2000		Michigan	W 75–59	14–7 (6–4)	Assembly Hall (15,539); Champaign, IL
2/12/2000; IowaSports		Iowa; Rivalry	W 78–50	15–7 (7–4)	Assembly Hall (16,450); Champaign, IL
2/17/2000; ESPN		at Minnesota	W 89–80	16–7 (8–4)	Williams Arena (13,795); Minneapolis, MN
2/19/2000; ESPN+		at Northwestern; Rivalry	W 63–30	17–7 (9–4)	Welsh-Ryan Arena (8,117); Evanston, IL
2/22/2000; ESPN		No. 16 Indiana; Rivalry	W 87–63	18–7 (10–4)	Assembly Hall (16,450); Champaign, IL
2/27/2000; 4:00 pm, CBS		at No. 6 Ohio State	L 51–64	18–8 (10–5)	Value City Arena (19,100); Columbus, OH
3/4/2000; ESPN+	No. 25	Northwestern; Rivalry	W 73–44	19–8 (11–5)	Assembly Hall (16,450); Champaign, IL
Big Ten tournament
3/10/2000; ESPN2	(4) No. 21	vs. (5) No. 13 Indiana; Quarterfinals	W 72–69	20–8	United Center (21,141); Chicago, IL
3/11/2000; 2:30 pm, CBS	(4) No. 21	vs. (9) Penn State; Semifinals	W 94–84	21–8	United Center (22,011); Chicago, IL
3/12/2000; 4:00 pm, CBS	(4) No. 21	vs. (2) No. 5 Michigan State; Championship	L 61–76	21–9	United Center (19,663); Chicago, IL
NCAA tournament
3/17/2000; CBS	(4E) No. 21	vs. (13E) Penn; First Round	W 68–58	22–9	Lawrence Joel Veterans Memorial Coliseum (14,252); Winston-Salem, NC
3/19/2000; CBS	(4E) No. 21	vs. (5E) Florida; Second Round	L 76–93	22–10	Lawrence Joel Veterans Memorial Coliseum (14,252); Winston-Salem, NC
*Non-conference game. ^{#}Rankings from AP Poll. (#) Tournament seedings in parentheses. All times are in Central Time.

== Player stats ==
Player	Games Played	2 pt. Field Goals	3 pt. Field Goals	Free Throws	Rebounds	Assists	Blocks	Steals	Points
Cory Bradford	32	60	96	82	80	63	1	31	490
Frank Williams	32	83	42	70	135	20	41	16	366
Marcus Griffin	27	110	0	70	135	20	41	16	290
Brian Cook	32	100	12	51	143	24	28	22	287
Cleotis Brown	32	60	21	40	113	33	4	24	223
Sergio McClain	29	67	4	51	109	71	5	53	197
Lucas Johnson	32	21	29	67	106	62	7	25	196
Damir Krupalija	27	38	5	16	112	28	6	20	107
Robert Archibald	30	35	0	31	97	15	7	12	101
Sean Harrington	30	6	20	20	15	29	1	9	92
Victor Chukwedebe	23	18	0	15	45	7	9	3	51
Nate Mast	21	2	1	8	8	16	1	6	15
Joe Cross	10	3	1	0	3	0	0	2	9

== NCAA basketball tournament ==
- East regional
  - Illinois 68, Pennsylvania 58
  - Florida 93, Illinois 76

== Awards and honors ==
- Frank Williams
  - Fighting Illini All-Century team (2005)
- Brian Cook
  - Big Ten Freshman of the Year
  - Fighting Illini All-Century team (2005)
- Cory Bradford
  - Team Most Valuable Player
