= 2000 NCAA Division I men's basketball tournament =

Edition of USA college basketball tournament

- Season: 1999–00
- Teams: 64
- Finals site: RCA Dome, Indianapolis, Indiana
- Champions: Michigan State Spartans (2nd title, 2nd title game, 4th Final Four)
- Runner-up: Florida Gators (1st title game, 2nd Final Four)
- Semifinalists: North Carolina Tar Heels (15th Final Four); Wisconsin Badgers (2nd Final Four)
- Winning coach: Tom Izzo (1st title)
- MOP: Mateen Cleaves (Michigan State)
- Attendance: 624,777
- Top scorer: Morris Peterson (Michigan State) (105 points)

The 2000 NCAA Division I men's basketball tournament involved 64 schools playing in single-elimination play to determine the national champion of men's NCAA Division I college basketball. The 62nd annual edition of the tournament began on March 16, 2000, and ended with the championship game on April 3 in Indianapolis, Indiana at the RCA Dome. A total of 63 games were played.

Due to a string of upsets throughout the tournament, only one top-four seed advanced to the Final Four. That was Michigan State, who finished the season as the #2 team in the nation and was given the top seed in the Midwest Region. The highest seeded of the other three Final Four teams was Florida, who won the East Region as the fifth seed. Two eight-seeds made the Final Four, with Wisconsin and North Carolina rounding the bracket out. Wisconsin won the West Region while North Carolina won the South Region, with both regions seeing their top three seeds eliminated during the first weekend of play.

Michigan State won their first national championship since 1979 by defeating Florida 89–76 in the final game. Mateen Cleaves of Michigan State was named the tournament's Most Outstanding Player, while Morris Peterson was its leading scorer.

Despite the string of upsets, no seed lower than 11 won a game in the tournament. The only 11 seed to win was Pepperdine, which defeated Indiana in the East Region's first round in what turned out to be Bob Knight's last game coaching the Hoosiers before his firing that offseason. Also, two teams that qualified as 10 seeds advanced to the Sweet Sixteen as Seton Hall in the East and Gonzaga in the West both advanced.

Because of the upsets, the Elite Eight consisted of one top seed (Michigan State), one second seed (Iowa State), one third seed (Oklahoma State), one fifth seed (Florida), one sixth seed (Purdue), one seventh seed (Tulsa), and two eighth seeds (Wisconsin and North Carolina). This was the most recent title won by the Big Ten Conference until 2026, which was also held in Indianapolis.

== Schedule and venues ==
2000 first and second rounds
2000 Regionals (blue) and Final Four (red)

The following are the sites that were selected to host each round of the 2000 tournament:

First and Second Rounds

- March 16 and 18
  - Midwest Region
    - CSU Convocation Center, Cleveland, Ohio (Host: Cleveland State University)
    - Hubert H. Humphrey Metrodome, Minneapolis, Minnesota (Host: University of Minnesota)
  - West Region
    - Jon M. Huntsman Center, Salt Lake City, Utah (Host: University of Utah)
    - McKale Center, Tucson, Arizona (Host: University of Arizona)
- March 17 and 19
  - East Region
    - HSBC Arena, Buffalo, New York (Hosts: Canisius College, Niagara University, Metro Atlantic Athletic Conference)
    - Lawrence Joel Veterans Memorial Coliseum, Winston-Salem, North Carolina (Host: Wake Forest University)
  - South Region
    - BJCC Arena, Birmingham, Alabama (Host: Southeastern Conference)
    - Gaylord Entertainment Center, Nashville, Tennessee (Host: Ohio Valley Conference)

Regional semifinals and finals (Sweet Sixteen and Elite Eight)

- March 23 and 25
  - Midwest Regional, The Palace of Auburn Hills, Auburn Hills, Michigan (Host: Mid-American Conference)
  - West Regional, University Arena ("The Pit"), Albuquerque, New Mexico (Host: University of New Mexico)
- March 24 and 26
  - East Regional, Carrier Dome, Syracuse, New York (Host: Syracuse University)
  - South Regional, Frank Erwin Center, Austin, Texas (Host: University of Texas at Austin)

National semifinals and championship (Final Four and championship)

- April 1 and 3
  - RCA Dome, Indianapolis, Indiana (Hosts: Butler University, IUPUI)

== Teams ==
There were 30 automatic bids awarded to the tournament - of these, 28 were given to the winners of their conference's tournament, while two were awarded to the team with the best regular-season record in their conference (Ivy League and Pac-10).

Three conference champions made their first NCAA tournament appearances: UNC Wilmington (CAA), Central Connecticut State (NEC), and Southeast Missouri State (Ohio Valley).

While the Mountain West Conference held a conference tournament, the conference was not granted an automatic bid to the tournament until the 2000–01 season.

=== Automatic qualifiers ===
Automatic qualifiers
| Conference | Team | Appearance | Last bid |
|---|---|---|---|
| ACC | Duke | 24th | 1999 |
| America East | Hofstra | 3rd | 1977 |
| Atlantic 10 | Temple | 24th | 1999 |
| Big 12 | Iowa State | 11th | 1997 |
| Big East | St. John's | 26th | 1999 |
| Big Sky | Northern Arizona | 2nd | 1998 |
| Big South | Winthrop | 2nd | 1999 |
| Big Ten | Michigan State | 14th | 1999 |
| Big West | Utah State | 13th | 1998 |
| CAA | UNC Wilmington | 1st | Never |
| Conference USA | Saint Louis | 6th | 1998 |
| Ivy League | Penn | 18th | 1999 |
| MAAC | Iona | 5th | 1998 |
| MAC | Ball State | 7th | 1995 |
| MCC | Butler | 4th | 1998 |
| MEAC | South Carolina State | 4th | 1998 |
| Mid-Continent | Valparaiso | 5th | 1999 |
| Missouri Valley | Creighton | 11th | 1999 |
| NEC | Central Connecticut State | 1st | Never |
| Ohio Valley | Southeast Missouri State | 1st | Never |
| Pac-10 | Arizona | 18th | 1999 |
| Patriot | Lafayette | 3rd | 1999 |
| SEC | Arkansas | 25th | 1999 |
| Southern | Appalachian State | 2nd | 1979 |
| Southland | Lamar | 5th | 1983 |
| SWAC | Jackson State | 2nd | 1997 |
| Sun Belt | Louisiana–Lafayette | 5th | 1994 |
| TAAC | Samford | 2nd | 1999 |
| WAC | Fresno State (vacated) | – | 1984 |
| West Coast | Gonzaga | 3rd | 1999 |

=== Listed by region and seeding ===
East Regional – Carrier Dome, Syracuse, New York
| Seed | School | Conference | Record | Berth type |
|---|---|---|---|---|
| 1 | Duke | ACC | 28–4 | Automatic |
| 2 | Temple | Atlantic 10 | 26–5 | Automatic |
| 3 | Oklahoma State | Big 12 | 24–6 | At-Large |
| 4 | Illinois | Big Ten | 21–9 | At-Large |
| 5 | Florida | SEC | 24–7 | At-Large |
| 6 | Indiana | Big Ten | 20–8 | At-Large |
| 7 | Oregon | Pac-10 | 22–7 | At-Large |
| 8 | Kansas | Big 12 | 23–9 | At-Large |
| 9 | DePaul | Conference USA | 21–10 | At-Large |
| 10 | Seton Hall | Big East | 20–9 | At-Large |
| 11 | Pepperdine | West Coast | 24–8 | At-Large |
| 12 | Butler | MCC | 23–7 | Automatic |
| 13 | Penn | Ivy League | 21–7 | Automatic |
| 14 | Hofstra | America East | 24–6 | Automatic |
| 15 | Lafayette | Patriot | 24–6 | Automatic |
| 16 | Lamar | Southland | 15–15 | Automatic |

South Regional – Frank Erwin Center, Austin, Texas
| Seed | School | Conference | Record | Berth type |
|---|---|---|---|---|
| 1 | Stanford | Pac-10 | 26–3 | At-Large |
| 2 | Cincinnati | Conference USA | 28–3 | At-Large |
| 3 | Ohio State (vacated) | Big Ten | 22–6 | At-Large |
| 4 | Tennessee | SEC | 24–6 | At-Large |
| 5 | Connecticut | Big East | 24–9 | At-Large |
| 6 | Miami (FL) | Big East | 21–10 | At-Large |
| 7 | Tulsa | WAC | 29–4 | At-Large |
| 8 | North Carolina | ACC | 18–13 | At-Large |
| 9 | Missouri | Big 12 | 18–12 | At-Large |
| 10 | UNLV | Mountain West | 20–9 | At-Large |
| 11 | Arkansas | SEC | 19–14 | Automatic |
| 12 | Utah State | Big West | 28–5 | Automatic |
| 13 | Louisiana-Lafayette | Sun Belt | 25–8 | Automatic |
| 14 | Appalachian State | Southern | 23–8 | Automatic |
| 15 | UNC Wilmington | CAA | 18–12 | Automatic |
| 16 | South Carolina State | MEAC | 20–13 | Automatic |

Midwest Regional – The Palace of Auburn Hills, Auburn Hills, Michigan
| Seed | School | Conference | Record | Berth type |
|---|---|---|---|---|
| 1 | Michigan State | Big Ten | 26–7 | Automatic |
| 2 | Iowa State | Big 12 | 29–4 | Automatic |
| 3 | Maryland | ACC | 24–9 | At-Large |
| 4 | Syracuse | Big East | 24–5 | At-Large |
| 5 | Kentucky | SEC | 22–9 | At-Large |
| 6 | UCLA | Pac-10 | 19–11 | At-Large |
| 7 | Auburn | SEC | 23–9 | At-Large |
| 8 | Utah | Mountain West | 22–8 | At-Large |
| 9 | Saint Louis | Conference USA | 19–13 | Automatic |
| 10 | Creighton | Missouri Valley | 23–9 | Automatic |
| 11 | Ball State | MAC | 22–8 | Automatic |
| 12 | St. Bonaventure | Atlantic 10 | 21–9 | At-Large |
| 13 | Samford | TAAC | 21–10 | Automatic |
| 14 | Iona | MAAC | 20–10 | Automatic |
| 15 | Central Connecticut State | Northeast | 25–5 | Automatic |
| 16 | Valparaiso | Mid-Continent | 19–12 | Automatic |

West Regional – The Pit, Albuquerque, New Mexico
| Seed | School | Conference | Record | Berth type |
|---|---|---|---|---|
| 1 | Arizona | Pac-10 | 26–6 | Automatic |
| 2 | St. John's | Big East | 24–7 | Automatic |
| 3 | Oklahoma | Big 12 | 26–6 | At-Large |
| 4 | LSU | SEC | 26–5 | At-Large |
| 5 | Texas | Big 12 | 23–8 | At-Large |
| 6 | Purdue | Big Ten | 21–9 | At-Large |
| 7 | Louisville | Conference USA | 19–11 | At-Large |
| 8 | Wisconsin | Big Ten | 18–13 | At-Large |
| 9 | Fresno State (vacated) | WAC | 24–9 | Automatic |
| 10 | Gonzaga | West Coast | 24–8 | Automatic |
| 11 | Dayton | Atlantic 10 | 22–8 | At-Large |
| 12 | Indiana State | Missouri Valley | 22–9 | At-Large |
| 13 | Southeast Missouri State | Ohio Valley | 22–6 | Automatic |
| 14 | Winthrop | Big South | 21–8 | Automatic |
| 15 | Northern Arizona | Big Sky | 20–10 | Automatic |
| 16 | Jackson State | SWAC | 17–15 | Automatic |

== Bids by conference ==
Bids by Conference
| Bids | Conference(s) |
|---|---|
| 6 | Big Ten, Big 12, SEC |
| 5 | Big East |
| 4 | C-USA, Pac-10 |
| 3 | ACC, Atlantic 10 |
| 2 | Mountain West, Missouri Valley, WAC, WCC |
| 1 | 19 others |

== Final Four ==
At RCA Dome, Indianapolis, Indiana

=== National semifinals ===
- April 1, Michigan State (M1) 53, Wisconsin (W8) 41
  In the first half it appeared that the Cinderella run of the Wisconsin Badgers had a great chance of continuing. Wisconsin's slow down offense, smothering defense tempo held the game to a Michigan State Spartans 19–17 lead. However, the only number one seed left in the tournament opened the second half with a 13–2 run, including 10 points from senior Morris Peterson. After the run, Michigan State coasted home against Wisconsin's limited offense.
  - Florida (E5) 71, North Carolina (S8) 59
  Despite being behind 18–3 to start the game and trailing at halftime, the North Carolina Tar Heels took control of the early minutes of the second half, and managed to sneak ahead 48–42 on standout freshman guard Joseph Forte's second consecutive three-pointer with 15:44 to play. However, the Florida Gators answered back with a 9–0 run to give them the lead for good. The Gators held the Tar Heels to just six points over a 9 1/2 minute span to put them in great shape. Foul trouble ultimately doomed the Tar Heels, and the Gators advanced to their first ever National Championship game.

=== Championship game ===
- April 3, 2000
  - Michigan State (M1) 89, Florida (E5) 76
  Michigan State senior Mateen Cleaves limped his way to the Most Outstanding Player (MOP) of the 2000 NCAA Tournament. Cleaves sprained his ankle with 16:18 to play in the 2nd half, and this was after Florida had trimmed Michigan State's double digit halftime lead to 50–44. Cleaves returned about four minutes later, and immediately helped lead the Spartans on a 16–6 run to put the game out of reach. The lone top-seed remaining would bring order to a tournament filled with upsets as they salted away the victory for the school's second national championship (1979). Michigan State coach Tom Izzo earned his first and only title, from his second straight final four appearance. Morris Peterson led the Spartans with 21 points.

== Bracket ==
=== East Regional – Syracuse, New York ===
First round
1 | Duke | 82
16 | Lamar | 55
Winston-Salem
8 | Kansas | 81^{OT}
9 | DePaul | 77
5 | Florida | 69^{OT}
12 | Butler | 68
Winston-Salem
4 | Illinois | 68
13 | Pennsylvania | 58
6 | Indiana | 57
11 | Pepperdine | 77
Buffalo
3 | Oklahoma State | 86
14 | Hofstra | 66
7 | Oregon | 71
10 | Seton Hall | 72^{OT}
Buffalo
2 | Temple | 73
15 | Lafayette | 47

Quarter-finals
1 | Duke | 69
8 | Kansas | 64
5 | Florida | 93
4 | Illinois | 76
11 | Pepperdine | 67
3 | Oklahoma State | 75
10 | Seton Hall | 67^{OT}
2 | Temple | 65

Regional semifinals
1 | Duke | 78
5 | Florida | 87
3 | Oklahoma State | 68
10 | Seton Hall | 66

Regional Finals
5 | Florida | 77
3 | Oklahoma State | 65

=== South Regional – Austin, Texas ===
First round
1 | Stanford | 84
16 | South Carolina State | 65
Birmingham
8 | North Carolina | 84
9 | Missouri | 70
5 | Connecticut | 75
12 | Utah State | 67
Birmingham
4 | Tennessee | 63
13 | Louisiana-Lafayette | 58
6 | Miami (FL) | 75
11 | Arkansas | 71
Nashville
3 | ~~Ohio State~~ | 87
14 | Appalachian State | 61
7 | Tulsa | 89
10 | UNLV | 62
Nashville
2 | Cincinnati | 64
15 | UNC Wilmington | 47

Quarter-finals
1 | Stanford | 53
8 | North Carolina | 60
5 | Connecticut | 51
4 | Tennessee | 65
6 | Miami (FL) | 75
3 | ~~Ohio State~~ | 62
7 | Tulsa | 69
2 | Cincinnati | 61

Regional semifinals
8 | North Carolina | 74
4 | Tennessee | 69
6 | Miami (FL) | 71
7 | Tulsa | 80

Regional Finals
8 | North Carolina | 59
7 | Tulsa | 55

Ohio State vacated 16 games including all NCAA Tournament wins from the 1999–2000 season due to the Jim O’Brien scandal. Unlike forfeiture, a vacated game does not result in the other school being credited with a win, only with Ohio State removing the wins from its own record.

=== Midwest Regional – Auburn Hills, Michigan ===
First round
1 | Michigan State | 65
16 | Valparaiso | 38
Cleveland
8 | Utah | 48
9 | St. Louis | 45
5 | Kentucky | 85^{2OT}
12 | St. Bonaventure | 80
Cleveland
4 | Syracuse | 79
13 | Samford | 65
6 | UCLA | 65
11 | Ball State | 57
Minneapolis
3 | Maryland | 74
14 | Iona | 59
7 | Auburn | 72
10 | Creighton | 69
Minneapolis
2 | Iowa State | 88
15 | Central Connecticut St | 78

Quarter-finals
1 | Michigan State | 73
8 | Utah | 61
5 | Kentucky | 50
4 | Syracuse | 52
6 | UCLA | 105
3 | Maryland | 70
7 | Auburn | 60
2 | Iowa State | 79

Regional semifinals
1 | Michigan State | 75
4 | Syracuse | 58
6 | UCLA | 56
2 | Iowa State | 80

Regional Finals
1 | Michigan State | 75
2 | Iowa State | 64

=== West Regional – Albuquerque, New Mexico ===
First round
1 | Arizona | 71
16 | Jackson St. | 47
Salt Lake City
8 | Wisconsin | 66
9 | Fresno St. | 56
5 | Texas | 77
12 | Indiana St. | 61
Salt Lake City
4 | LSU | 64
13 | Southeast Missouri St. | 61
6 | Purdue | 62
11 | Dayton | 61
Tucson
3 | Oklahoma | 74
14 | Winthrop | 50
7 | Louisville | 66
10 | Gonzaga | 77
Tucson
2 | St John's | 61
15 | Northern Arizona | 56

Quarter-finals
1 | Arizona | 59
8 | Wisconsin | 66
5 | Texas | 67
4 | LSU | 72
6 | Purdue | 66
3 | Oklahoma | 62
10 | Gonzaga | 82
2 | St John's | 76

Regional semifinals
8 | Wisconsin | 61
4 | LSU | 48
6 | Purdue | 75
10 | Gonzaga | 66

Regional Finals
8 | Wisconsin | 64
6 | Purdue | 60

=== Final Four at Indianapolis, Indiana ===
National semifinals
E5 | Florida | 71
S8 | North Carolina | 59
M1 | Michigan State | 53
W8 | Wisconsin | 41

National championship game
E5 | Florida | 76
M1 | Michigan State | 89

== Broadcast information ==
=== Television ===
CBS Sports had exclusive TV coverage. They were carried on a regional basis until the "Elite Eight", at which point all games were shown nationally.

- Jim Nantz/Billy Packer/Bonnie Bernstein – First and Second Rounds at Winston-Salem, North Carolina; East Regional at Syracuse, New York; Final Four and National Championship at Indianapolis, Indiana
- Verne Lundquist/Bill Raftery/Armen Keteyian – First and Second Rounds at Minneapolis, Minnesota; Midwest Regional at Auburn Hills, Michigan
- Dick Enberg/James Worthy/Spencer Tillman – First and Second Rounds at Birmingham, Alabama; South Regional at Austin, Texas
- Gus Johnson/Dan Bonner/Beth Mowins – First and Second Rounds at Tucson, Arizona; West Regional at Albuquerque, New Mexico
- Kevin Harlan/Jon Sundvold/Debbie Antonelli – First and Second Rounds at Cleveland, Ohio
- Ian Eagle/Jim Spanarkel/Dwayne Ballen – First and Second Rounds at Buffalo, New York
- Tim Brando/Rolando Blackman/Jimmy Dykes – First and Second Rounds at Nashville, Tennessee
- Craig Bolerjack/Barry Booker/Mike Harris – First and Second Rounds at Salt Lake City, Utah

Greg Gumbel once again served as the studio host, joined by analyst Clark Kellogg.

=== Radio ===
Westwood One had exclusive radio coverage.

| Play-by-play announcer | Color analyst(s) | Round(s) | Site(s) |
|---|---|---|---|
| John Rooney | | Midwest 1st/2nd rounds | Cleveland |
| Wayne Larrivee | | Midwest 1st/2nd rounds | Minneapolis |
| Kevin Harlan | Jon Sundvold | Midwest Regional | Michigan |
| John Rooney (Michigan State games) | Bill Raftery (Michigan State games) | Final Four | Indiana |
| Marty Brennaman (Florida – North Carolina) | Dave Gavitt (Florida – North Carolina) | Final Four | Indiana |

Tommy Tighe once again served as studio host.

=== Local radio ===
| Region | Seed | Teams | Flagship station | Play-by-play announcer | Color analyst(s) |
|---|---|---|---|---|---|
| E | 5 | Florida | WRUF–AM (Florida) | Mick Hubert | Mark Wise |
| E | 8 | Kansas | KLWN-AM | Bob Davis | Max Falkenstein |
| S | 8 | North Carolina | WCHL–AM (North Carolina) | Woody Durham | Mick Mixon |
| MW | 1 | Michigan State | WJIM–AM/WJIM-FM (Michigan State) | Mark Champion | Gus Ganakas |
| MW | 4 | Syracuse | (Syracuse) | | |
| MW | 5 | Kentucky | (Kentucky) | | |
| MW | 8 | Utah | (Utah) | | |
| MW | 9 | Saint Louis | (Saint Louis) | | |
| MW | 12 | St. Bonaventure | WHDL–AM 1450/WPIG–FM 95.7 (St. Bonaventure) | Gary Nease | John Watson |
| MW | 13 | Samford | WVSU–FM 91.1 (Samford) | Scott Griffin | Mike Royer |
| MW | 16 | Valparaiso | (Valparaiso) | | |
| W | 4 | LSU | WDGL-FM 98.1, WWL-AM 870 | Jim Hawthorne | Kevin Ford |
| W | 8 | Wisconsin | WIBA–AM/WOLX-FM (Wisconsin) | Matt Lepay | Mike Lucas |

== See also ==
- 2000 NCAA Division II men's basketball tournament
- 2000 NCAA Division III men's basketball tournament
- 2000 NCAA Division I women's basketball tournament
- 2000 NCAA Division II women's basketball tournament
- 2000 NCAA Division III women's basketball tournament
- 2000 National Invitation Tournament
- 2000 Women's National Invitation Tournament
- 2000 NAIA Division I men's basketball tournament
- 2000 NAIA Division II men's basketball tournament
