= 1999–2000 NCAA Division I men's basketball rankings =

1999–00 NCAA Division I men's basketball rankings
- Season: 1999–00
- NCAA Tournament: 2000
- Preseason No. 1: Connecticut
- NCAA Tournament Champions: Michigan State
NCAA Division I men's basketball rankings


The 1999–2000 NCAA Division I men's basketball rankings was made up of two human polls, the AP Poll and the Coaches Poll, in addition to various other preseason polls.

== Legend ==
	Increase in ranking
	Decrease in ranking
	New to rankings from previous week
Italics	Number of first place votes
(#–#)	Win–loss record
т	Tied with team above or below also with this symbol

== AP Poll ==
	Preseason	Week 2 Nov. 16	Week 3 Nov. 23	Week 4 Nov. 30	Week 5 Dec. 7	Week 6 Dec. 14	Week 7 Dec. 21	Week 8 Dec. 28	Week 9 Jan. 4	Week 10 Jan. 11	Week 11 Jan. 18	Week 12 Jan. 25	Week 13 Feb. 1	Week 14 Feb. 8	Week 15 Feb. 15	Week 16 Feb. 22	Week 17 Feb. 29	Week 18 Mar. 7	Final Mar. 14	
1.	Connecticut	Cincinnati (0–0)	Cincinnati (1–0)	Cincinnati (4–0)	Cincinnati (5–0)	Cincinnati (7–0)	Stanford (8–0)	Stanford (9–0)	Stanford (11–0)	Cincinnati (14–1)	Cincinnati (16–1)	Cincinnati (18–1)	Cincinnati (20–1)	Cincinnati (22–1)	Cincinnati (23–1)	Stanford (22–1)	Stanford (24–1)	Cincinnati (28–2)	Duke (27–4)	1.
2.	Cincinnati	Michigan State (0–0)	Auburn (2–0)	North Carolina (3–0)	Arizona (6–0)	Stanford (6–0)	Connecticut (7–1)	Connecticut (8–1)	Connecticut (9–1)	Arizona (13–2)	Arizona (15–2)	Stanford (15–1)	Stanford (17–1)	Stanford (19–1)	Stanford (21–1)	Duke (21–3)	Cincinnati (26–2)	Stanford (25–2)	Michigan State (26–7)	2.
3.	Michigan State	Auburn (0–0)	Michigan State (1–0)	Stanford (5–0)	Stanford (5–0)	Connecticut (7–1)	Arizona (9–1)	Cincinnati (9–1)	Cincinnati (12–1)	Stanford (12–1)	Stanford (14–1)	Duke (15–2)	Duke (16–2)	Duke (18–2)	Duke (19–3)	Cincinnati (24–2)	Arizona (24–4)	Duke (24–4)	Stanford (26–3)	3.
4.	Auburn	Ohio State (0–0)	North Carolina (0–0)	Arizona (4–0)	Michigan State (6–1)	Arizona (7–1)	Cincinnati (8–1)	Auburn (10–1)	Auburn (12–1)	Auburn (13–1)	Auburn (15–1)	Syracuse (15–0)	Syracuse (17–0)	Syracuse (19–0)	Arizona (21–4)	Arizona (23–4)	Duke (22–4)	Ohio State (22–5)	Arizona (26–6)	4.
5.	Ohio State	North Carolina (0–0)	Temple (1–0)	Connecticut (3–1)	Kansas (6–0)	Michigan State (7–2)	Michigan State (8–2)	Arizona (9–2)	Arizona (11–2)	Connecticut (11–2)	Duke (13–2)	Arizona (16–3)	Ohio State (14–3)	Ohio State (16–3)	Tennessee (21–3)	Michigan State (20–6)	Temple (22–4)	Michigan State (23–7)	Temple (26–5)	5.
6.	North Carolina	Temple (0–0)	Florida (1–0)	Kansas (4–0)	Connecticut (5–1)	Auburn (5–1)	North Carolina (8–2)	Florida (9–1)	Florida (11–1)	Duke (11–2)	Syracuse (14–0)	Connecticut (13–3)	Tennessee (18–2)	Michigan State (17–6)	Michigan State (18–6)	Ohio State (18–5)	Ohio State (20–5)	Temple (23–5)	Iowa State (29–4)	6.
7.	Temple	Florida (0–0)	Connecticut (2–1)	Auburn (2–1)	North Carolina (5–1)	North Carolina (7–2)	Auburn (7–1)	Syracuse (8–0)	Syracuse (9–0)	Syracuse (11–0)	Kansas (14–2)	Auburn (16–2)	Connecticut (15–4)	Arizona (19–4)	Ohio State (17–4)	Tennessee (21–4)	Michigan State (21–7)	Iowa State (26–4)	Cincinnati (28–3)	7.
8.	Florida	Connecticut (1–1)	Arizona (2–0)	Michigan State (3–1)	Auburn (4–1)	Kansas (7–1)	Florida (7–1)	Michigan State (8–3)	Duke (9–2)	Kansas (12–2)	Connecticut (12–3)	Ohio State (13–3)	Michigan State (15–5)	Tennessee (19–3)	Oklahoma State (20–2)	Temple (20–4)	Florida (22–5)	Tennessee (24–5)	Ohio State (22–6)	8.
9.	Arizona	Stanford (2–0)	Stanford (3–0)	Texas (4–0)	Florida (5–1)	Florida (6–1)	Syracuse (7–0)	Duke (8–2)	Kansas (10–2)	Indiana (12–1)	Florida (13–2)	Michigan State (13–5)	Arizona (17–4)	Auburn (19–3)	Syracuse (20–2)	Florida (20–5)	Syracuse (23–3)	Arizona (24–6)	St. John's (24–7)	9.
10.	Duke	Arizona (0–0)	Kansas (1–0)	Temple (1–1)	Texas (4–1)	Syracuse (7–0)	Duke (7–2)	Kansas (9–2)	Indiana (10–1)	Florida (12–2)	Michigan State (12–4)	Florida (14–3)	Auburn (17–3)	Indiana (17–3)	Indiana (18–4)	Oklahoma State (21–3)	Iowa State (24–4)	LSU (25–4)	LSU (26–5)	10.
11.	Kansas	Kansas (0–0)	Kentucky (2–0)	Florida (3–1)	UCLA (3–0)	Duke (6–2)	Tennessee (9–0)	Oklahoma State (10–0)	Michigan State (9–4)	Michigan State (11–4)	Indiana (13–2)	Tennessee (16–2)	Indiana (15–3)	Kentucky (17–5)	Florida (18–5)	Auburn (21–4)	Tennessee (22–5)	Florida (23–6)	Tennessee (24–6)	11.
12.	UCLA	UCLA (0–0)	Ohio State (0–1)	UCLA (2–0)	Syracuse (6–0)	Ohio State (3–1)	Kansas (8–2)	Indiana (8–1)	Maryland (11–2)	Tennessee (14–1)	Oklahoma State (13–1)	Kansas (15–3)	Florida (15–4)	Florida (17–4)	Auburn (19–4)	Tulsa (25–2)	LSU (23–4)	Syracuse (24–4)	Oklahoma (26–6)	12.
13.	Stanford	Syracuse (2–0)	UCLA (1–0)	Kentucky (3–1)	Ohio State (2–1)	Tennessee (8–0)	Oklahoma State (9–0)	North Carolina (8–4)	Ohio State (8–2)	North Carolina (11–4)	Ohio State (11–3)	Tulsa (18–1)	Oklahoma State (16–2)	Connecticut (16–5)	Tulsa (22–2)	Syracuse (21–3)	Oklahoma State (22–4)	Texas (22–7)	Florida (24–7)	13.
14.	Kentucky	Kentucky (0–0)	Syracuse (2–0)	Syracuse (3–0)	Duke (5–2)	Oklahoma State (7–0)	Texas (6–2)	Maryland (9–2)	North Carolina (9–4)	Oklahoma State (12–1)	Texas (11–4)	Indiana (14–3)	Kentucky (15–5)	Oklahoma State (18–2)	Iowa State (21–3)	Texas (19–6)	Indiana (19–6)	Tulsa (27–3)	Oklahoma State (24–6)	14.
15.	Utah	St. John's (0–0)	Illinois (1–0)	Ohio State (0–1)	Indiana (4–0)	Texas (5–2)	Illinois (6–2)	Ohio State (6–2)	Tennessee (12–1)	Texas (9–3)	Tulsa (16–1)	Oklahoma State (14–2)	Kansas (16–4)	Tulsa (22–2)	Temple (18–4)	LSU (21–4)	Tulsa (26–3)	Oklahoma (24–5)	Texas (23–8)	15.
16.	Illinois	Utah (0–0)	Duke (1–2)	Illinois (2–0)	Tennessee (6–0)	Maryland (8–2)	Ohio State (5–2)	Tennessee (11–1)	Oklahoma State (10–1)	Oklahoma (13–1)	Tennessee (15–2)	Kentucky (13–5)	Texas (14–5)	Oklahoma (18–3)	LSU (19–4)	Indiana (18–5)	Texas (20–7)	Kentucky (22–8)	Syracuse (24–5)	16.
17.	Syracuse	Illinois (0–0)	Tennessee (0–0)	Duke (3–2)	Oklahoma State (6–0)	Temple (3–2)	Maryland (8–2)	Temple (5–2)	Texas (8–3)	Ohio State (9–3)	Oklahoma (14–2)	Texas (12–5)	Tulsa (20–2)	Iowa State (19–3)	Texas (17–6)	Iowa State (22–4)	Maryland (21–7)	Oklahoma State (23–5)	Maryland (24–9)	17.
18.	St. John's	Duke (0–2)	DePaul (1–0)	Tennessee (3–0)	Wake Forest (5–0)	UCLA (3–1)	UCLA (4–1)	Texas (6–3)	Utah (11–2)	Maryland (11–4)	Kentucky (11–5)	Oklahoma (15–3)	Oklahoma (16–3)	Texas (15–6)	Connecticut (17–6)	Kentucky (19–7)	St. John's (20–6)	Indiana (20–7)	Tulsa (29–4)	18.
19.	Tennessee	Tennessee (0–0)	Utah (2–1)	Purdue (2–1)	Temple (2–2)	DePaul (6–2)	Temple (4–2)	Wake Forest (8–1)	Illinois (8–3)	Tulsa (14–1)	St. John's (12–2)	Utah (14–3)	Utah (16–3)	Temple (16–4)	Kentucky (17–7)	Maryland (19–7)	Auburn (21–6)	St. John's (21–7)	Kentucky (22–9)	19.
20.	DePaul	DePaul (0–0)	Texas (1–0)	Utah (2–1)	DePaul (4–2)	Illinois (5–2)	Indiana (7–1)	Illinois (6–3)	Oklahoma (11–1)	Kentucky (10–4)	Vanderbilt (12–2)	Vanderbilt (12–3)	Iowa State (16–3)	Kansas (17–5)	Oklahoma (19–4)	Oklahoma (20–5)	Purdue (21–7)	Maryland (22–8)	Connecticut (24–9)	20.
21.	Texas	Texas (0–0)	Oklahoma State (2–0)	Oklahoma State (4–0)	Maryland (6–2)	Indiana (6–1)	Oklahoma (9–0)	Utah (8–2)	LSU (12–0)	DePaul (11–3)	North Carolina (11–6)	NC State (13–3)	Temple (14–4)	Utah (17–4)	Utah (19–4)	Purdue (19–7)	Oklahoma (22–5)	Connecticut (21–8)	Illinois (21–9)	21.
22.	Oklahoma State	Iowa (1–1)	Purdue (0–0)	DePaul (3–1)	Illinois (3–2)	Gonzaga (5–2)	Gonzaga (7–2)	Oklahoma (9–1)	Tulsa (13–1)	Illinois (9–4)	Utah (13–3)	Maryland (13–5)	LSU (16–3)	Vanderbilt (15–4)	Maryland (17–7)	Connecticut (18–7)	Kentucky (20–8)	Purdue (21–8)	Indiana (20–8)	22.
23.	Purdue	Oklahoma State (0–0)	Iowa (2–1)	Indiana (2–0)	Kentucky (3–3)	Oklahoma (8–0)	Wake Forest (7–1)	UCLA (6–2)	DePaul (10–3)	Temple (8–3)	DePaul (12–4)	Temple (12–4) т	Oregon (15–3)	Maryland (16–6)	Seton Hall (18–4)	Kansas (19–7)	Kansas (21–7)	Miami (FL) (20–9)	Miami (FL) (21–10)	23.
24.	Gonzaga	Purdue (0–0)	Maryland (2–0)	Maryland (4–1)	Gonzaga (4–1)	Purdue (6–2)	DePaul (7–3)	DePaul (8–3)	UCLA (8–2)	LSU (13–1)	Maryland (11–5)	USC (12–5) т	Vanderbilt (13–4)	Oregon (16–4)	Kansas (18–6)	Vanderbilt (17–6)	Connecticut (19–8)	Kansas (22–8)	Auburn (23–9)	24.
25.	Miami (FL)	Gonzaga (0–0)	Gonzaga (1–0)	Gonzaga (2–0)	Purdue (3–2)	Wake Forest (5–1)	NC State (7–0)	Tulsa (11–1)	Kentucky (8–4)	Louisville (10–3)	UCLA (10–4)	St. John's (12–4)	Maryland (14–6)	LSU (17–4)	Purdue (17–7)	Utah (19–5)	Illinois (18–8)	Illinois (19–8)	Purdue (21–9)	25.
	Preseason	Week 2 Nov. 16	Week 3 Nov. 23	Week 4 Nov. 30	Week 5 Dec. 7	Week 6 Dec. 14	Week 7 Dec. 21	Week 8 Dec. 28	Week 9 Jan. 4	Week 10 Jan. 11	Week 11 Jan. 18	Week 12 Jan. 25	Week 13 Feb. 1	Week 14 Feb. 8	Week 15 Feb. 15	Week 16 Feb. 22	Week 17 Feb. 29	Week 18 Mar. 7	Final Mar. 14	
		Dropped: Miami (FL) (0–0)	Dropped: St. John's (2–1)	Dropped: Iowa (2–2)	Dropped: Utah (3–2)	Dropped: Kentucky (4–4)	Dropped: Purdue (6–3)	Dropped: Gonzaga (7–3); NC State (7–1)	Dropped: Temple (6–3); Wake Forest (9–3)	Dropped: Utah (11–3); UCLA (9–3)	Dropped: Illinois (9–6); Temple (9–4); LSU (13–3); Louisville (10–5)	Dropped: North Carolina (11–8); DePaul (12–6); UCLA (11–5)	Dropped: NC State (14–4); USC (13–6); St. John's (13–6)	None	Dropped: Vanderbilt (16–5); Oregon (17–5)	Dropped: Seton Hall (18–6)	Dropped: Vanderbilt (17–8); Utah (20–6)	Dropped: Auburn (21–8)	Dropped: Kansas (23–9)	

== Coaches Poll ==
	Preseason	Week 2 Nov. 23	Week 3 Nov. 30	Week 4 Dec. 7	Week 5 Dec. 14	Week 6 Dec. 21	Week 7 Dec. 28	Week 8 Jan. 4	Week 9 Jan. 11	Week 10 Jan. 18	Week 11 Jan. 25	Week 12 Feb. 1	Week 13 Feb. 8	Week 14 Feb. 15	Week 15 Feb. 22	Week 16 Feb. 29	Week 17 Mar. 7	Week 18 Mar. 14	Final Apr. 4	
1.	Connecticut	Cincinnati (1–0)	Cincinnati (4–0)	Cincinnati (5–0)	Cincinnati (7–0)	Stanford (8–0)	Stanford (9–0)	Stanford (11–0)	Cincinnati (14–1)	Cincinnati (16–1)	Cincinnati (18–1)	Cincinnati (20–1)	Cincinnati (22–1)	Cincinnati (23–1)	Stanford (22–1)	Stanford (24–1)	Cincinnati (28–2)	Duke (27–4)	Michigan State (32–7)	1.
2.	Michigan State	Michigan State (1–0)	North Carolina (3–0)	Arizona (6–0)	Stanford (6–0)	Arizona (9–1)	Connecticut (8–1)	Connecticut (9–1)	Arizona (13–2)	Arizona (15–2)	Stanford (15–1)	Stanford (17–1)	Stanford (19–1)	Stanford (21–1)	Duke (21–3)	Cincinnati (26–2)	Duke (24–4)	Michigan State (26–7)	Florida (29–8)	2.
3.	Cincinnati	Auburn (2–0)	Stanford (5–0)	Stanford (5–0)	Arizona (7–1)	Connecticut (7–1)	Cincinnati (9–1)	Cincinnati (12–1)	Stanford (12–1)	Stanford (14–1)	Duke (15–2)	Duke (16–2)	Duke (18–2)	Duke (19–3)	Cincinnati (24–2)	Arizona (24–4)	Stanford (25–2)	Stanford (26–3)	Iowa State (32–5)	3.
4.	Auburn	Temple (1–0)	Arizona (4–0)	Kansas (6–0)	Connecticut (7–1)	Cincinnati (8–1)	Arizona (9–2)	Arizona (11–2)	Connecticut (11–2)	Auburn (15–1)	Arizona (16–3)	Syracuse (17–0)	Syracuse (19–0)	Arizona (21–4)	Arizona (23–4)	Duke (22–4)	Michigan State (23–7)	Arizona (26–6)	Duke (29–5)	4.
5.	North Carolina	Florida (1–0)	Auburn (2–1)	Michigan State (6–1)	Michigan State (7–2)	Michigan State (8–2)	Auburn (10–1)	Auburn (12–1)	Auburn (13–1)	Syracuse (14–0)	Syracuse (15–0)	Arizona (17–4)	Michigan State (17–6)	Michigan State (18–6)	Michigan State (20–6)	Ohio State (20–5)	Ohio State (22–5)	Temple (26–5)	Stanford (27–4)	5.
6.	Ohio State	North Carolina (0–0)	Kansas (4–0)	Connecticut (5–1)	Kansas (7–1)	Auburn (7–1)	Michigan State (8–3)	Florida (11–1)	Syracuse (11–0)	Duke (13–2)	Connecticut (13–3)	Michigan State (15–5)	Ohio State (16–3)	Tennessee (21–3)	Ohio State (18–5)	Michigan State (21–7)	Arizona (24–6)	Cincinnati (28–3)	Oklahoma State (27–7)	6.
7.	Temple	Connecticut (2–1) т	Michigan State (3–1)	North Carolina (5–1)	Auburn (5–1)	North Carolina (8–2)	Florida (9–1)	Duke (9–2)	Duke (11–2)	Connecticut (12–3)	Auburn (16–2)	Connecticut (15–4)	Arizona (19–4)	Ohio State (17–4)	Tennessee (21–4)	Temple (22–4)	Temple (23–5)	Iowa State (29–4)	Cincinnati (29–4)	7.
8.	Florida	Stanford (3–0) т	Connecticut (3–1)	Auburn (4–1)	Florida (6–1)	Florida (7–1)	Duke (8–2)	Syracuse (9–0)	Kansas (12–2)	Kansas (14–2)	Michigan State (13–5)	Ohio State (14–3)	Auburn (19–3)	Syracuse (20–2)	Auburn (21–4)	Florida (22–5)	Tennessee (24–5)	Ohio State (22–6)	Arizona (27–7)	8.
9.	Arizona	Arizona (2–0)	Temple (1–1)	Syracuse (6–0)	North Carolina (7–2)	Syracuse (7–0)	Syracuse (8–0)	Kansas (10–2)	Florida (12–2)	Florida (13–2)	Florida (14–3)	Tennessee (18–2)	Tennessee (19–3) т	Oklahoma State (20–2)	Oklahoma State (21–3)	Syracuse (23–3)	Iowa State (26–4)	LSU (26–5)	Tulsa (32–5)	9.
10.	Duke	Kentucky (2–0)	Florida (3–1)	Florida (5–1)	Syracuse (7–0)	Duke (7–2)	Kansas (9–2)	Michigan State (9–4)	Indiana (12–1)	Michigan State (12–4)	Ohio State (13–3)	Auburn (17–3)	Indiana (17–3) т	Indiana (18–4)	Florida (20–5)	Tennessee (22–5)	Florida (23–6)	Tennessee (24–6)	Temple (27–6)	10.
11.	Kansas	Kansas (1–0)	Texas (4–0)	UCLA (3–0)	Duke (6–2)	Kansas (8–2)	Oklahoma State (10–0)	Indiana (10–1)	Michigan State (11–4)	Indiana (13–2)	Kansas (15–3)	Indiana (15–3)	Florida (17–4)	Auburn (19–4)	Syracuse (21–3)	Oklahoma State (22–4)	LSU (25–4)	Florida (24–7)	North Carolina (22–14)	11.
12.	Kentucky	UCLA (1–0)	Kentucky (3–1)	Texas (4–1)	Tennessee (8–0)	Tennessee (9–0)	Indiana (8–1)	Oklahoma State (10–1)	Tennessee (14–1)	Oklahoma State (13–1)	Indiana (14–3)	Florida (15–4)	Connecticut (16–5)	Florida (18–5)	Temple (20–4)	Indiana (19–6)	Syracuse (24–4)	St. John's (24–7)	Syracuse (26–6)	12.
13.	Stanford	Syracuse (2–0)	UCLA (2–0)	Duke (5–2)	Ohio State (3–1)	Oklahoma State (9–0)	Tennessee (11–1)	Tennessee (12–1)	Oklahoma State (12–1)	Texas (11–4)	Tennessee (16–2)	Texas (14–5)	Oklahoma State (18–2)	Tulsa (22–2)	Tulsa (25–2)	Auburn (21–6)	Indiana (20–7)	Oklahoma (26–6)	LSU (28–6)	13.
14.	UCLA	Ohio State (0–1)	Syracuse (3–0)	Indiana (4–0)	Maryland (8–2)	Texas (6–2)	North Carolina (8–4)	North Carolina (9–4)	North Carolina (11–4)	Tennessee (15–2)	Texas (12–5)	Oklahoma State (16–2)	Kentucky (17–5)	Texas (17–6)	Indiana (18–5)	Iowa State (24–4)	Oklahoma State (23–5)	Syracuse (24–5)	Tennessee (26–7)	14.
15.	Utah	Duke (1–2)	Duke (3–2)	Tennessee (6–0)	Oklahoma State (7–0)	Maryland (8–2)	Texas (6–3)	Maryland (11–2)	Texas (9–3)	Ohio State (11–3)	Tulsa (18–1)	Kansas (16–4)	Tulsa (22–2)	Temple (18–4)	Texas (19–6)	Texas (20–7)	Texas (22–7)	Oklahoma State (24–6)	Purdue (24–10)	15.
16.	Tennessee	Illinois (1–0)	Illinois (2–0)	Ohio State (2–1)	Texas (5–2)	UCLA (4–1)	Maryland (9–2)	Texas (8–3)	Maryland (11–4)	Oklahoma (14–2)	Oklahoma State (14–2)	Tulsa (20–2)	Texas (15–6)	Kentucky (17–7)	Kentucky (19–7)	LSU (23–4)	Kentucky (22–8)	Maryland (24–9)	Wisconsin (22–14)	16.
17.	Syracuse	Utah (2–1)	Ohio State (0–1)	Oklahoma State (6–0)	UCLA (3–1)	Illinois (6–2)	Temple (5–2)	Illinois (8–3)	Oklahoma (13–1)	Tulsa (16–1)	Oklahoma (15–3)	Oklahoma (16–3) т	Oklahoma (18–3)	Iowa State (21–3)	LSU (21–4)	Tulsa (26–3)	Tulsa (27–3)	Indiana (21–9)	Ohio State (23–7)	17.
18.	Illinois	Tennessee (0–0)	Tennessee (3–0)	Temple (2–2)	Temple (3–2)	Indiana (7–1)	Ohio State (6–2)	Ohio State (6–2)	Ohio State (9–3)	Kentucky (11–5)	Kentucky (13–5)	Kentucky (15–5) т	Kansas (17–5)	Connecticut (17–6)	Iowa State (22–4)	Kentucky (20–8)	Oklahoma (24–5)	Texas (23–8)	St. John's (25–8)	18.
19.	St. John's	DePaul (1–0)	Utah (2–1)	Maryland (6–2)	Indiana (6–1)	Temple (4–2)	Wake Forest (8–1)	Oklahoma (11–1)	DePaul (11–3)	UCLA (10–4)	Utah (14–3)	Utah (16–3)	Temple (16–4)	Oklahoma (19–4)	Maryland (19–7)	Maryland (21–7)	Maryland (22–8)	Tulsa (29–4)	Oklahoma (27–7)	19.
20.	DePaul	Texas (1–0)	DePaul (3–1)	DePaul (4–2)	DePaul (6–2)	Ohio State (5–2)	Illinois (6–3)	UCLA (8–2)	Temple (8–3)	Utah (13–3)	UCLA (11–5)	Temple (14–4)	Utah (17–4)	Utah (19–4)	Oklahoma (20–5)	Oklahoma (22–5)	St. John's (21–7)	Kentucky (22–9)	Miami (FL) (23–11)	20.
21.	Purdue	Purdue (0–0)	Purdue (2–1)	Wake Forest (5–0)	Purdue (6–2)	Oklahoma (9–0)	UCLA (6–2)	Temple (6–3)	Illinois (9–4)	North Carolina (11–6)	Maryland (13–5)	Maryland (14–6)	Iowa State (19–3)	Kansas (18–6)	Connecticut (18–7)	St. John's (20–6)	Purdue (21–8)	Connecticut (24–9)	Texas (24–9)	21.
22.	Texas	Maryland (2–0)	Oklahoma State (4–0)	Kentucky (3–3)	Illinois (5–2)	Wake Forest (7–1)	Oklahoma (9–1)	Utah (11–2)	Tulsa (14–1)	DePaul (12–4)	Vanderbilt (12–3)	NC State (14–4)	Maryland (16–6)	Maryland (17–7)	Vanderbilt (17–6)	Purdue (21–7)	Connecticut (21–8)	Auburn (23–9)	Kentucky (23–10)	22.
23.	Maryland	Oklahoma State (2–0)	Maryland (4–1)	Purdue (3–2)	Wake Forest (5–1)	DePaul (7–3)	DePaul (8–3)	DePaul (10–3)	Kentucky (10–4)	St. John's (12–2)	St. John's (12–4)	Vanderbilt (13–4)	Vanderbilt (15–4)	LSU (19–4)	Kansas (19–7)	Kansas (21–7)	Auburn (21–8)	Illinois (21–9)	UCLA (21–12)	23.
24.	Miami (FL)	Miami (FL) (1–0)	Indiana (2–0)	Illinois (3–2)	Oklahoma (8–0)	Utah (7–2)	Utah (8–2)	Kentucky (8–4)	Utah (11–3)	Vanderbilt (12–2)	Temple (12–4)	Iowa State (16–3)	NC State (15–5)	Vanderbilt (16–5)	Utah (19–5)	Connecticut (19–8)	Kansas (22–8)	Purdue (21–9)	Gonzaga (26–9)	24.
25.	Oklahoma State	Gonzaga (1–0)	Miami (FL) (2–0)	Utah (3–2)	Utah (5–2)	Gonzaga (7–2)	Kentucky (6–4)	Tulsa (13–1)	UCLA (9–3)	Illinois (9–6)	NC State (13–3)	LSU (16–3)	LSU (17–4)	Seton Hall (18–4)	Purdue (19–7)	Vanderbilt (17–8)	Oregon (21–7)	Miami (FL) (21–10)	Maryland (25–10)	25.
	Preseason	Week 2 Nov. 23	Week 3 Nov. 30	Week 4 Dec. 7	Week 5 Dec. 14	Week 6 Dec. 21	Week 7 Dec. 28	Week 8 Jan. 4	Week 9 Jan. 11	Week 10 Jan. 18	Week 11 Jan. 25	Week 12 Feb. 1	Week 13 Feb. 8	Week 14 Feb. 15	Week 15 Feb. 22	Week 16 Feb. 29	Week 17 Mar. 7	Week 18 Mar. 14	Final Apr. 4	
		Dropped: St. John's (1–1)	Dropped: Gonzaga (2–0)	Dropped: Miami (FL) (3–1)	Dropped: Kentucky (4–4)	Dropped: Purdue (7–3)	Dropped: Gonzaga (7–3)	Dropped: Wake Forest (9–3)	None	Dropped: Maryland (11–5); Temple (9–4)	Dropped: North Carolina (11–8); DePaul (12–6); Illinois (10–7)	Dropped: UCLA (12–6); St. John's (13–6)	None	Dropped: NC State (15–7)	Dropped: Seton Hall (18–6)	Dropped: Utah (20–6)	Dropped: Vanderbilt (18–9)	Dropped: Kansas (23–9); Oregon (22–7)	Dropped: Connecticut (25–10); Illinois (22–10); Indiana (20–9); Auburn (24–10)	
