= Ball State Cardinals men's basketball statistical leaders =

The Ball State Cardinals men's basketball statistical leaders are individual statistical leaders of the Ball State Cardinals men's basketball program in various categories, including points, rebounds, assists, steals, and blocks. Within those areas, the lists identify single-game, single-season, and career leaders. The Cardinals represent Ball State University in the NCAA's Mid-American Conference.

Ball State began competing in intercollegiate basketball in 1920. However, the school's record book does not generally list records from before the 1950s, as records from before this period are often incomplete and inconsistent. Since scoring was much lower in this era, and teams played much fewer games during a typical season, it is likely that few or no players from this era would appear on these lists anyway.

The NCAA did not officially record assists as a stat until the 1983–84 season, and blocks and steals until the 1985–86 season, but Ball State's record books includes players in these stats before these seasons. These lists are updated through the end of the 2020–21 season.

== Scoring ==
Career
Rk	Player	Points	Seasons
1	Bonzi Wells	2,485	1994–95 1995–96 1996–97 1997–98
2	Ray McCallum	2,109	1979–80 1980–81 1981–82 1982–83
3	Larry Bullington	1,747	1971–72 1972–73 1973–74
4	Derrick Wesley	1,729	1984–85 1985–86 1986–87 1987–88
5	Jim Regenold	1,685	1969–70 1970–71 1971–72
6	Jarrod Jones	1,623	2008–09 2009–10 2010–11 2011–12
7	Theron Smith	1,599	1999–00 2000–01 2001–02 2002–03
8	Duane Clemens	1,585	1996–97 1997–98 1998–99 1999–00
9	Tayler Persons	1,558	2016–17 2017–18 2018–19
10	Tahjai Teague	1,518	2016–17 2017–18 2018–19 2019–20

Season
Rk	Player	Points	Season
1	Dan Palombizio	762	1984–85
2	Chris Williams	736	2002–03
3	Jim Regenold	716	1970–71
4	Bonzi Wells	712	1995–96
5	Theron Smith	687	2001–02
6	Larry Bullington	664	1973–74
7	Bonzi Wells	662	1997–98
8	Bonzi Wells	637	1996–97
9	Larry Bullington	621	1972–73
10	Dan Palombizio	607	1985–86

Single game
Rk	Player	Points	Season	Opponent
1	Chris Williams	48	2002–03	Akron
2	Larry Bullington	47	1973–74	Cleveland St.
3	Ed Butler	45	1963–64	Valparaiso
4	Chris Williams	44	2002–03	C. Michigan
5	Larry Bullington	41	1972–73	N. Iowa
	Bonzi Wells	41	1995–96	E. Michigan
7	Stan Neal	40	1964–65	St. Joseph's
	Terry Stillabower	40	1966–67	Indiana St.
	Jim Regenold	40	1970–71	Kent
	Bonzi Wells	40	1994–95	Ohio
	Bonzi Wells	40	1995–96	W. Michigan
	Theron Smith	40	2000–01	Texas Tech
	Chris Williams	40	2001–02	South Florida

== Rebounds ==
Career
Rk	Player	Rebounds	Seasons
1	Ed Butler	1,231	1961–62 1962–63 1963–64
2	Randy Boarden	1,000	1975–76 1976–77 1977–78 1978–79
3	Jarrod Jones	981	2008–09 2009–10 2010–11 2011–12
4	Tahjai Teague	961	2016–17 2017–18 2018–19 2019–20
5	Trey Moses	905	2015–16 2016–17 2017–18 2018–19
6	Steve Payne	885	1992–93 1993–94 1994–95
7	Theron Smith	882	1999–00 2000–01 2001–02 2002–03
8	Bonzi Wells	843	1994–95 1995–96 1996–97 1997–98
9	Payton Sparks	770	2021–22 2022–23 2024–25
10	Franko House	741	2013–14 2014–15 2015–16 2016–17

Season
Rk	Player	Rebounds	Season
1	Ed Butler	442	1963–64
2	Ed Butler	406	1962–63
3	Ed Butler	383	1961–62
4	Theron Smith	381	2001–02
5	Steve Payne	336	1992–93
6	Mike Readnour	328	1960–61
7	Dan Palombizio	318	1984–85
8	Mack Sawyer	304	1965–66
9	Dan Palombizio	302	1985–86
10	Bo Calhoun	296	2015–16

Single game
Rk	Player	Rebounds	Season	Opponent
1	Ed Butler	27	1961–62	N. Illinois
	Ed Butler	27	1962–63	Valparaiso
3	Ed Butler	26	1961–62	Indiana State
	Ed Butler	26	1961–62	Franklin
	Ed Butler	26	1962–63	DePauw
6	Ed Butler	25	1963–64	Manchester
7	Ed Butler	24	1961–62	C. Michigan
	Ed Butler	24	1962–63	St. Joseph’s
	Ed Butler	24	1963–64	Valparaiso
10	Stan Davis	23	1959–60	DePauw
	Bill Clark	23	1972–73	Oakland

== Assists ==
Career
Rk	Player	Assists	Seasons
1	Jim Hahn	573	1975–76 1976–77 1977–78 1978–79
2	Chris Shelton	481	1982–83 1983–84 1984–85 1985–86
3	Tayler Persons	447	2016–17 2017–18 2018–19
4	Randy Davis	446	2008–09 2009–10 2010–11 2011–12
5	Mike Spicer	430	1988–89 1989–90 1990–91 1991–92
6	Scott Nichols	406	1986–87 1987–88 1988–89 1989–90
7	Bonzi Wells	386	1994–95 1995–96 1996–97 1997–98
8	Patrick Jackson	349	1998–99 1999–00 2000–01 2001–02
	Peyton Stovall	349	2003–04 2004–05 2005–06 2006–07 2007–08
10	John Williams	344	1979–80 1980–81 1981–82

Season
Rk	Player	Assists	Season
1	Jamie Matthews	207	1992–93
2	Chris Shelton	182	1984–85
3	Chris Shelton	171	1985–86
4	Jim Hahn	170	1978–79
5	Tayler Persons	167	2016–17
6	Randy Davis	160	2010–11
7	Mike Spicer	157	1991–92
8	Jim Hahn	155	1975–76

Single game
Rk	Player	Assists	Season	Opponent
1	Bob Faulkner	19	1973–74	Racine
2	Bob Faulkner	16	1974–75	Ohio
3	Jamie Matthews	15	1992–93	C. Michigan
4	Tayler Persons	14	2016–17	IU Kokomo
5	Tayler Persons	13	2016–17	NIU
	Bob Faulkner	13	1974–75	Indiana St.
	Chris Shelton	13	1984–85	Rider

== Steals ==
Career
Rk	Player	Steals	Seasons
1	Bonzi Wells	347	1994–95 1995–96 1996–97 1997–98
2	Duane Clemens	249	1996–97 1997–98 1998–99 1999–00
3	Mickey Hosier	172	1996–97 1997–98 1998–99 1999–00
	Ray McCallum	172	1979–80 1980–81 1981–82 1982–83

Season
Rk	Player	Steals	Season
1	Bonzi Wells	103	1997–98
2	Bonzi Wells	87	1995–96
3	Bonzi Wells	84	1994–95
4	Duane Clemens	75	1999–00
5	Bonzi Wells	73	1996–97
6	Keith Stalling	67	1991–92
	Duane Clemens	67	1998–99
8	Marcus Norris	65	1994–95
9	Paris McCurdy	64	1989–90
10	Chris Bond	62	2012–13
	Duane Clemens	62	1997–98
	John Williams	62	1981–82
	Tyler Cochran	62	2021–22

Single game
Rk	Player	Steals	Season	Opponent
1	Bonzi Wells	10	1995–96	Ohio
2	Bonzi Wells	9	1997–98	Akron
	Bonzi Wells	9	1997–98	E. Michigan
4	Duane Clemens	8	1999–00	UCLA

== Blocks ==
Career
Rk	Player	Blocks	Seasons
1	Lonnie Jones	301	1998–99 1999–00 2000–01 2001–02
2	Trey Moses	139	2015–16 2016–17 2017–18 2018–19
3	Tahjai Teague	134	2016–17 2017–18 2018–19 2019–20
4	Randy Boarden	131	1975–76 1976–77 1977–78 1978–79
5	Jarrod Jones	115	2008–09 2009–10 2010–11 2011–12
6	George Bradley	106	1977–78 1978–79 1979–80 1980–81
7	Steve Payne	101	1992–93 1993–94 1994–95
8	Bonzi Wells	92	1994–95 1995–96 1996–97 1997–98
9	Roman Muller	85	1988–89 1989–90
10	Payton Sparks	64	2021–22 2022–23 2024–25

Season
Rk	Player	Blocks	Season
1	Lonnie Jones	89	2001–02
2	Charles Smith	86	1986–87
3	Lonnie Jones	84	1999–00
4	Lonnie Jones	76	2000–01
5	Lonnie Jones	52	1998–99
6	Tahjai Teague	48	2019–20
7	Roman Muller	45	1989–90
8	Steve Payne	42	1992–93
9	George Bradley	41	1978–79
	Charles Bass	41	2005–06

Single game
Rk	Player	Blocks	Season	Opponent
1	Charles Smith	11	1986–87	Central Mich.
