= 1999–2000 Mid-American Conference men's basketball season =

- League: NCAA Division I
- Sport: Basketball
- Teams: 13

Regular season
- League champions: Bowling Green
- Runners-up: Kent State
- Season MVP: Anthony Stacey

Tournament
- Champions: Ball State
- Runners-up: Miami
- Finals MVP: Duane Clemens

Mid-American men's basketball seasons
- ← 1998–99 2000–01 →

1999–2000 Mid-American Conference men's basketball standings
	Conf.				Overall
Team	W		L	PCT	W		L	PCT
East
Bowling Green	14	–	4	.778	22	–	8	.733
Kent State	13	–	5	.722	23	–	8	.742
Akron	11	–	7	.611	17	–	11	.607
Marshall	11	–	7	.611	21	–	9	.700
Ohio	11	–	7	.611	20	–	13	.606
Miami	8	–	10	.444	15	–	15	.500
Buffalo	3	–	15	.167	5	–	23	.179
West
Ball State†	11	–	7	.611	22	–	9	.710
Toledo	11	–	7	.611	18	–	13	.581
Eastern Michigan	9	–	9	.500	15	–	13	.536
Northern Illinois	7	–	11	.389	13	–	15	.464
Western Michigan	6	–	12	.333	10	–	18	.357
Central Michigan	2	–	16	.111	6	–	23	.207
† 2000 MAC tournament winner As of Rankings from AP Poll

The 1999–2000 Mid-American Conference men's basketball season began with practices in October 1999, followed by the start of the 1999–2000 NCAA Division I men's basketball season in November. Conference play began in January 2000 and concluded in March 2000. Central Michigan won the regular season title with a conference record of 14–4 by one game over second-place Kent State. Ball State defeated Miami in the MAC tournament final and represented the MAC in the NCAA tournament. There they lost to UCLA. Kent State and Bowling Green both played in the NIT.

== Preseason awards ==
The preseason poll was announced by the league office on October 21, 1999.

=== Preseason men's basketball poll ===
(First place votes in parentheses)

==== East Division ====
1. Akron (15) 230
2. Kent State (17) 220
3. Bowling Green 173
4. Marshall (2) 150
5. Ohio (4) 146
6. Miami 103
7. Buffalo 40

==== West Division ====
1. Toledo (20) 189
2. Ball State (11) 162
3. Northern Illinois (3) 123
4. Western Michigan (3) 117
5. Central Michigan (1) 116
6. Eastern Michigan 87

==== Tournament champs ====
Kent State (15), Akron (12), Bowling Green (3), Ohio (4), Marshall (2), Toledo (1), Northern Illinois (1)

=== Honors ===
Honor	Recipient
Preseason All-MAC First Team	Anthony Stacey, Bowling Green
Preseason All-MAC First Team	John Whorton, Kent State
Preseason All-MAC First Team	Greg Stempin, Toledo
Preseason All-MAC First Team	Jami Bosley, Akron
Preseason All-MAC First Team	T.J. Lux, N. Illinois

== Postseason ==
=== Postseason awards ===
1. Coach of the Year: Gary Waters, Kent State
2. Player of the Year: Anthony Stacey, Bowling Green
3. Freshman of the Year: Theron Smith, Ball State
4. Defensive Player of the Year: Rob Mestas, Miami

=== Honors ===
Honor	Recipient
Postseason All-MAC First Team	Shaun Stonerook, Ohio
Postseason All-MAC First Team	Anthony Stacey, Bowling Green
Postseason All-MAC First Team	Tamar Slay, Marshall
Postseason All-MAC First Team	T.J. Lux, N. Illinois
Postseason All-MAC First Team	Greg Stempin, Toledo
Postseason All-MAC Second Team	John Whorton, Kent
Postseason All-MAC Second Team	Duane Clemens, Ball State
Postseason All-MAC Second Team	Anthony Taylor, Miami
Postseason All-MAC Second Team	Jami Bosley, Akron
Postseason All-MAC Second Team	Trevor Huffman, Kent
Postseason All-MAC Honorable Mention	J.R. VanHoose, Marshall
Postseason All-MAC Honorable Mention	Tony Barksdale, W. Michigan
Postseason All-MAC Honorable Mention	David Webber, C. Michigan
Postseason All-MAC Honorable Mention	Jimmal Ball, Akron
Postseason All-MAC Honorable Mention	Calvin Warner, E. Michigan
Postseason All-MAC Honorable Mention	Sanjay Adell, Ohio
Postseason All-MAC Honorable Mention	Justin Hall, Toledo
Postseason All-MAC Honorable Mention	Dave Esterkamp, Bowling Green
Postseason All-MAC Honorable Mention	Rob Mestas, Miami
Postseason All-MAC Honorable Mention	Len Matela, Bowling Green
All-MAC Freshman Team	Andy Hipsher, Akron
All-MAC Freshman Team	Theron Smith, Ball State
All-MAC Freshman Team	Chad Pleiness, Central Michigan
All-MAC Freshman Team	C.J. Grantham, Eastern Michigan
All-MAC Freshman Team	Brandon Hunter, Ohio
