= David Webber (basketball) =

American basketball player (born 1980)

Personal information
- Born: April 5, 1980 (age 46) Detroit, Michigan, U.S.
- Listed height: 6 ft 2 in (1.88 m)
- Listed weight: 210 lb (95 kg)

Career information
- High school: Detroit Country Day (Beverly Hills, Michigan)
- College: Central Michigan (1998–2002)
- NBA draft: 2002: undrafted
- Playing career: 2003–2004
- Position: Point guard

Career history
- 2003: Oklahoma Storm
- 2004: Great Lakes Storm

Career highlights
- AP Honorable Mention All-American (2001); MAC Player of the Year (2001); First-team All-MAC (2001)

David Ranier Webber (born April 5, 1980) is an American former basketball player. He played college basketball for Central Michigan of the Mid-American Conference (MAC) from 1998 to 2002. Webber played the point guard position and was the 2001 Mid-American Conference Men's Basketball Player of the Year. He was a first team All-MAC player in 2001 and an honorable mention All-MAC player in 2000 and 2002. Webber holds Central Michigan's all-time records for single-game free throws and home arena single-game points.

In high school, Webber won three Michigan High School Athletic Association (MHSAA) championships for Detroit Country Day School. He had a brief two-year professional career in the United States Basketball League and Continental Basketball Association. He is the youngest brother of Hall of Famer Chris Webber.

== Early life ==
Webber is the son of Mayce Webber, Jr. and Doris Webber. Doris, a teacher, and Mayce, a General Motors employee, had provided for and forced their children to attend the private academy Detroit Country Day School rather than Southwestern High School like other kids in the neighborhood. At Detroit Country Day, Webber was teammates with his brother Jason as a 1994–95 freshman while his brother was a senior. He performed the role of sixth man as a freshman before becoming a three-year starter. His 1996–97 junior season teammates included Shane Battier, who was a class ahead of him and classmates Javin Hunter and Mike Manciel. That team was the two-time MHSAA Class B defending champion and had climbed into the top 10 in the USA Today national poll prior to an injury to Battier and two subsequent losses. The team lost a third game without Battier and another starter to the Sergio McClain-led Illinois High School Association state champion Manual High School. The team healed up and repeated as Class B state champion, finishing the season with a 25–3 record. He described the pressure of being Chris' younger brother as having a severe impact on his mental state: “I can remember being in my house after another bad game during my junior year in high school, when I told God not to wake me up in the morning,” David said. “I was praying all night, for hours, saying, ‘God, please don’t wake me up.’ “I felt a lot of pressure and I didn’t feel like I could take it anymore.”

Webber was only the third leading returning scorer (10.1 points per game) for the team that the USA Today described as "Favorite for fourth consecutive Class B title" when ranking them 15th in the preseason. However, he often played a leading role during his senior season. In fact, he averaged 20 points over the first six games before focusing more on his role as the floor general because he felt the team had more success with him scoring less. He averaged 14 points over the course of the season and led the team in assists and blocked shots. Following the season, he earned Class B Second Team All-State recognition from The Detroit News and an All-USA Basketball Honorable Mention by USA Today. As of March 26, 1998, Webber was being recruited by Central Michigan, Eastern Michigan, Boston College, Virginia and Maryland. On April 15, the Detroit News reported that he signed his National Letter of Intent with Central Michigan, who had already signed the team's leading scorer, Manciel.

== College career ==
Webber joined the 1998–99 CMU team the same season his brother, Jason, transferred there from Michigan State. Jason had redshirted for the 1995–96 Michigan State Spartans and played for the 1996–97 team. At Central Michigan, Webber and his brother Jason were coached by Jay Smith, who had been on the coaching staff for the Michigan Wolverines men's basketball teams that their oldest brother, Chris, played on. Manciel, who had played with him at Detroit Country Day, matriculated to CMU with David.

Webber holds the Central Michigan record for McGuirk Arena single-game points (51 vs. Ball State February 24, 2000), breaking the previous arena record set on December 5, 1977 by Larry Bird (45 points), which remained the visiting player record as of the March 2020 update of the Central Michigan Record Book. Webber's 51-point performance was the sixth-highest single-game point total in MAC history at the time. It was also the second-highest point total (highest in regulation) of the 1999–2000 NCAA Division I men's basketball season, trailing only 61 by Eddie House in double-overtime for Arizona State against Cal.

On February 11, 2001, he became one of 15 finalists (along with Battier) for the Oscar Robertson Trophy, presented by the U.S. Basketball Writers Association. At the time, Central Michigan was on a 10-game winning streak (17–4); Webber was averaging 20.2 points per game, and the team had clinched its first winning season since Dan Majerle's 1987–88 senior season. He led the MAC in scoring (18.4 ppg) for the 2000–01 season and was the 2001 Mid-American Conference Men's Basketball Player of the Year. That season, he led Central Michigan in scoring, rebounding (5.2), (Note: His rebounding lead was not total rebounds. Chad Pleiness had 145 in 28 games=5.179 rpg and Webber had 140 in 27 games=5.185 rpg both showing as 5.2 in the record book.) assists (2.8) and steals (1.5). His Associated Press 2001 All-American honorable mention made him the second CMU player to receive any type of NCAA All-American recognition (Majerle) and third overall All-American (NAIA). He was a first team All-MAC player in 2001 and an honorable mention All-MAC player in the 1999–2000 and 2001–02 MAC seasons. He led Central Michigan in scoring all three of those seasons (19.2, 18.4, 17.7).

Prior to 2001, no MAC team had ever gone from last to first in a single season turnaround, but the 1999–2000 Chippewas (6–23, 2–16) put the subsequent team in position to do so. With support from a bench that included Chris Kaman, he led the 2000–01 Central Michigan team (20–8, 14–4) to a first-place finish that marked the first time in MAC history a team had gone from worst-to-first. The 14.5 game turnaround was second in the nation to Boston College's 15 game turnaround.

The March 2020 update of the Central Michigan Record Book also shows that he holds the Central Michigan record for single-game free throws made (19, vs. Miami 2OT January 5, 2002). During his college career, he started 108 of the 109 games that he played in, and he posted double figures 84 times. He was voted team MVP 3 times. In 2012, Webber was inducted into the CMU Athletics Hall of Fame.

== Professional career ==
The Detroit Pistons held workouts in May 2002 for point guards that Webber participated in. Webber went undrafted in the June 26, 2002 NBA draft. He subsequently participated in the Indiana Pacers minicamp in July 2002. Webber attended the October 2002 Sacramento Kings training camp when his brother, Chris, played for the team and survived the first cut. However, in late October, he was released along with Jason Sasser and Corsley Edwards when the Kings reduced their roster to 14 players.

In 2003, Webber played five games for the Oklahoma Storm of the United States Basketball League. Webber was selected by the Asheville Altitude in the 10th round of the 2003 NBA Development League draft. At the team's 16-man training camp he was vying for the point guard position against Andre Smith, Kareem Reid, and Jaquay Walls. On November 13, 2003, Webber was cut when the roster was reduced from 16 players to 12 along with other lower (7th and 9th) draft picks. On January 15, 2004, Webber signed with the Great Lakes Storm of the Continental Basketball Association. In 21 games with them, he averaged 6.7 points, 2.0 rebounds and 3.3 assists per game.

== Personal life ==
Webber has 3 older brothers (Chris, Jeffrey and Jason) and a younger sister (Rachel). He was a teammate of his brother Jason at Central Michigan and Detroit Country Day. Jason played college basketball at Michigan State (1996–97) and Central Michigan (1998–2000). Chris and David were close, and David is credited with Chris' mid-career free throw shooting improvement.

== See also ==
- 2001 NCAA Men's Basketball All-Americans
- Central Michigan Chippewas men's basketball statistical leaders
