= Lewis Geter =

American basketball player

Personal information
- Born: December 17, 1969 (age 56) Columbus, Ohio, U.S.
- Listed height: 6 ft 8 in (2.03 m)
- Listed weight: 195 lb (88 kg)

Career information
- High school: Linden-McKinley (Columbus, Ohio)
- College: Nebraska (1989–1990); Ohio (1990–1992)
- NBA draft: 1992: undrafted
- Playing career: 1992–1999
- Position: Small forward

Career history
- 1992–1993: Columbus Horizon
- 1993–1994: Wichita Falls Texans
- 1997: Atléticos de San Germán
- 1998–1999: Seixal
- 1999: Atléticos de San Germán

Career highlights
- MAC Player of the Year (1992); 2× First-team All-MAC (1991, 1992)

Lewis Geter (born December 17, 1969) is an American former professional basketball player. He played college basketball for the Nebraska Cornhuskers and Ohio Bobcats. Geter was the MAC Player of the Year while playing for the Bobcats in 1992. He played professionally for seven seasons with stints in the Continental Basketball Association (CBA), Puerto Rico, Spain, Venezuela, Argentina, the Dominican Republic, Israel, Portugal, France and Chile.

== Early life ==
Geter was raised in the projects of Columbus, Ohio, by his mother, Betty, alongside two siblings. He began playing basketball as a child.

Geter attended Linden-McKinley High School in Columbus, where he led the basketball team to two state finals. He also played as a quarterback on the football team and an outfielder on the baseball team.

== College career ==
Geter received a full scholarship to attend the University of Nebraska–Lincoln. He was ineligible to play during his freshman season with the Cornhuskers in 1988–89. Geter decided to transfer during his sophomore year to be closer to home.

Geter joined the Ohio Bobcats before the start of the 1990–91 season. He led the Bobcats in scoring (18.1) and rebounding (6.8) during his junior season and was selected to the All-Mid-American Conference (MAC) first-team as the runner-up in MAC Player of the Year voting. Geter led the MAC in scoring during his senior season with 20.9 points per game and was second in rebounding with 8.4 rebounds per game. He led the Bobcats to an 18–10 record and was selected as the MAC Player of the Year.

Geter was inducted into the Ohio Athletics Hall of Fame in 2005.

== Professional career ==
Geter was automatically eligible for the 1992 NBA draft but was not selected. He was invited to two tryouts with the New York Knicks of the National Basketball Association (NBA). Geter played during the 1992 preseason with the Knicks and was called "the most impressive" amongst the team's options for a final roster spot. Despite playing well in limited preseason action, he was released on November 4, 1992, as the Knicks decided to keep Bo Kimble. Geter claims he was told by Knicks assistant coach, Jeff Van Gundy, that the position would have gone to him but the team did not want to pay out Kimble's guaranteed contract.

On November 26, 1992, Geter signed with the Columbus Horizon of the Continental Basketball Association (CBA). He averaged 5.7 points and 2.1 rebounds in 9 games played.

On October 1, 1993, Geter signed with the Knicks. He pulled his groin and was unable to play during most of the preseason camp. He was released on October 18, 1993.

On December 14, 1993, Geter signed with the Wichita Falls Texans of the CBA. He appeared in one game with the team during the 1993–94 season.

Geter played for Atléticos de San Germán of the Baloncesto Superior Nacional in Puerto Rico during the 1997 and 1999 seasons. He played for Seixal in Spain during the 1998–99 season. Geter played professionally for seven seasons with other stints in Venezuela, Argentina, the Dominican Republic, Israel, Portugal, France and Chile.

== Post-playing career ==
Geter taught as a substitute teacher in Springfield, Virginia. He then worked at John J. Wright Middle School in Spotsylvania County, Virginia, and was the head basketball coach for a year. Geter worked as an assistant at the Culpeper Juvenile Detention Center and a resident supervisor at the Rappahannock Juvenile Detention Center. In 2001, he became the youth sports director at the Rappahannock Area YMCA. Geter is a physical education teacher at Tree of Life Christian Prep School in Fredericksburg, Virginia.

== Personal life ==
Geter has three sons with his wife.

Geter is an ordained deacon at the Community Praise Center in Alexandria, Virginia.
