= Shaun Stonerook =

Italian-American basketball player (born 1977)

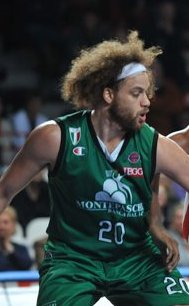
- Stonerook with Mens Sana Basket in 2012

Personal information
- Born: August 19, 1977 (age 49) Columbus, Ohio, U.S.
- Listed height: 6 ft 7 in (2.01 m)
- Listed weight: 245 lb (111 kg)

Career information
- High school: Westerville North (Westerville, Ohio)
- College: Ohio State (1995–1997); Ohio (1997–2000)
- NBA draft: 2000: undrafted
- Playing career: 2000–2012
- Position: Power forward / small forward
- Number: 20

Career history
- 2000–2001: Racing Antwerpen
- 2001–2005: Cantù
- 2005–2012: Mens Sana Basket

Career highlights
- EuroLeague steals leader (2008); 6× Italian Supercup winner (2003, 2007–2011); 6× Italian League champion (2007–2012); 4× Italian Cup winner (2009–2012); 2× Italian Cup MVP (2009, 2010); Italian Supercup MVP (2007); No. 20 Jersey retired by Mens Sana Basket; First-Team All-MAC (2000); Second-Team All-MAC (1999)

Shaun Andrew Stonerook (born August 19, 1977) is a retired Italian-American professional basketball player. At a height of 2.01 m (6 ft 7 in) tall, he played mainly at the power forward position, but he could also play as a small forward, if needed.

== High school ==
Stonerook played for Westerville North High School, in Westerville, Ohio for Ohio Basketball Hall of Fame Coach, Dave Hoover and was part of a talented tandem of forwards alongside Kevin Martin that led a dominant Warrior team to a 25–2 record and hard-fought OT win over Cincinnati Withrow in the 1994 Division I State championship game.

== College career ==
Stonerook played college basketball at Ohio State University, with the Ohio State Buckeyes, from 1995 to 1997. He then played college basketball at Ohio University with the Ohio Bobcats, from 1997 to 2000. With the Ohio Bobcats, he was named to the 1998–99 All-MAC Second Team, and to the 1999–00 All-MAC First Team.

== Professional career ==
Stonerook began his pro career in Belgium, during the 2000–01 season, with the Belgian League club Racing Basket Antwerpen. He then moved to the Italian League club Cantù the next season. In 2004, he joined the Italian club Mens Sana Basket Siena.

He announced his retirement from his basketball playing career on August 14, 2012.

== Career statistics ==
Legend
GP	Games played	GS	Games started	MPG	Minutes per game
FG%	Field-goal percentage	3P%	3-point field-goal percentage	FT%	Free-throw percentage
RPG	Rebounds per game	APG	Assists per game	SPG	Steals per game
BPG	Blocks per game	PPG	Points per game	PIR	Performance index rating
**Bold**	Career high

=== EuroLeague ===
*	Led the league

Year	Team	GP	GS	MPG	FG%	3P%	FT%	RPG	APG	SPG	BPG	PPG	PIR
2005–06	Mens Sana	13	7	23.2	.383	.261	**.895**	**6.3**	1.8	1.8	.1	4.5	8.4
2007–08	Mens Sana	**24**	**24**	**28.9**	.421	**.389**	.600	5.3	**1.9**	**2.6***	.5	**6.6**	**10.4**
2008–09	Mens Sana	20	19	26.2	.363	.276	.667	5.5	**1.9**	2.4	.3	6.4	8.3
2009–10	Mens Sana	16	15	23.9	**.446**	.368	.636	4.4	1.6	1.1	.2	4.9	6.7
2010–11	Mens Sana	20	15	23.9	.397	.368	.682	4.4	1.7	1.6	.1	4.2	6.2
2011–12	Mens Sana	20	15	21.2	.419	.345	.800	3.8	1.2	1.0	**.6**	3.3	5.3
Career		113	95	24.8	.402	.340	.701	4.9	1.7	1.8	.3	5.1	7.6

== Awards and accomplishments ==
=== Pro career ===
- Belgian League All-Star: (2001)
- 6× Italian Supercup Winner: (2003, 2007, 2008, 2009, 2010, 2011)
- 6× Italian League Champion: (2007, 2008, 2009, 2010, 2011, 2012)
- Italian SuperCup MVP: (2007)
- 4× Italian Cup Winner: (2009, 2010, 2011, 2012)
- 2× Italian Cup MVP: (2009, 2010)
