= 1999–2000 Ball State Cardinals men's basketball team =

American college basketball team season

1999–2000 Ball State Cardinals men's basketball

MAC tournament champions MAC West champions

NCAA tournament
- Conference: Mid-American Conference
- Record: 22–9 (11–7 MAC)
- Head coach: Ray McCallum (7th season)
- Home arena: Worthen Arena

1999–2000 Mid-American Conference men's basketball standings
	Conf.				Overall
Team	W		L	PCT	W		L	PCT
East
Bowling Green	14	–	4	.778	22	–	8	.733
Kent State	13	–	5	.722	23	–	8	.742
Akron	11	–	7	.611	17	–	11	.607
Marshall	11	–	7	.611	21	–	9	.700
Ohio	11	–	7	.611	20	–	13	.606
Miami	8	–	10	.444	15	–	15	.500
Buffalo	3	–	15	.167	5	–	23	.179
West
Ball State†	11	–	7	.611	22	–	9	.710
Toledo	11	–	7	.611	18	–	13	.581
Eastern Michigan	9	–	9	.500	15	–	13	.536
Northern Illinois	7	–	11	.389	13	–	15	.464
Western Michigan	6	–	12	.333	10	–	18	.357
Central Michigan	2	–	16	.111	6	–	23	.207
† 2000 MAC tournament winner As of Rankings from AP Poll

The 1999–2000 Ball State Cardinals men's basketball team represented Ball State University as a member of the Mid-American Conference during the 1999–2000 NCAA Division I men's basketball season. Led by seventh-year head coach Ray McCallum, Ball State played their home games at Worthen Arena. The Cardinals finished atop the MAC West Division regular season standings. Ball State won the MAC tournament to receive an automatic bid to the NCAA tournament as No. 11 seed in the Midwest region. In the opening round, the Cardinals were beaten by No. 6 seed UCLA and finished the season with a 22–9 record (11–7 MAC).

== Roster ==
1999–2000 Ball State Cardinals men's basketball team
Players
Coaches

Pos.	#	Name	Height	Weight	Year	Previous school	Hometown
G	12	Duane Clemens	6 ft 0 in (1.83 m)	—	Sr
F	21	Theron Smith	6 ft 8 in (2.03 m)	235 lb (107 kg)	Fr	Auburndale	Auburndale, Florida

Head coach

- Ray McCallum (Ball State)

Assistant coach(es)

Legend

- (C) Team captain
- (S) Suspended
- (I) Ineligible
- (W) Walk-on
- Injured
- Current redshirt

Roster

== Schedule and results ==
Date time, TV	Rank^{#}	Opponent^{#}	Result	Record	Site city, state
Non-conference regular season
Nov 20, 1999*		at Wisconsin	L 50–60	0–1	Kohl Center; Madison, Wisconsin
Nov 24, 1999*		Southern Illinois	W 79–74	1–1	Worthen Arena; Muncie, Indiana
Nov 27, 1999*		Indiana State	W 64–55	2–1	Worthen Arena; Muncie, Indiana
Dec 3, 1999*		Cornell	W 73–65	3–1	Worthen Arena; Muncie, Indiana
Dec 4, 1999*		Wisconsin–Milwaukee	W 71–58	4–1	Worthen Arena; Muncie, Indiana
Dec 11, 1999*		Butler	W 80–70	5–1	Worthen Arena; Muncie, Indiana
Dec 18, 1999*		vs. No. 24 Purdue	W 72–52	6–1	Conseco Fieldhouse; Indianapolis, Indiana
Dec 21, 1999*		Chaminade	W 101–79	7–1	Worthen Arena; Muncie, Indiana
Dec 27, 1999*		at San Diego State	W 82–65	8–1	Viejas Arena; San Diego, California
MAC regular season
Jan 2, 2000		at Northern Illinois	W 75–67	9–1 (1–0)	Chick Evans Field House; DeKalb, Illinois
Jan 5, 2000		Toledo	W 88–85 ^{OT}	10–1 (2–0)	Worthen Arena; Muncie, Indiana
Jan 8, 2000		at Eastern Michigan	L 93–98 ^{3OT}	10–2 (2–1)	Convocation Center; Ypsilanti, Michigan
Jan 12, 2000		at Miami (OH)	L 84–86 ^{3OT}	10–3 (2–2)	Millett Hall; Oxford, Ohio
Jan 15, 2000		Northern Illinois	L 64–76	10–4 (2–3)	Worthen Arena; Muncie, Indiana
Jan 19, 2000		at Kent State	L 55–77	10–5 (2–4)	Memorial Athletic and Convocation Center; Kent, Ohio
Jan 22, 2000		Central Michigan	W 88–69	11–5 (3–4)	Worthen Arena; Muncie, Indiana
Jan 24, 2000		at Marshall	L 73–85	11–6 (3–5)	Cam Henderson Center; Huntington, West Virginia
Jan 26, 2000		at Ohio	L 53–64	11–7 (3–6)	Convocation Center; Athens, Ohio
Jan 29, 2000		Buffalo	W 82–68	12–7 (4–6)	Worthen Arena; Muncie, Indiana
Feb 2, 2000		Bowling Green	W 71–61	13–7 (5–6)	Worthen Arena; Muncie, Indiana
Feb 5, 2000		Eastern Michigan	W 78–58	14–7 (6–6)	Worthen Arena; Muncie, Indiana
Feb 9, 2000		Western Michigan	W 80–60	15–7 (7–6)	Worthen Arena; Muncie, Indiana
Feb 14, 2000		Akron	W 89–68	16–7 (8–6)	Worthen Arena; Muncie, Indiana
Feb 16, 2000		at Toledo	L 61–66	16–8 (8–7)	John F. Savage Hall; Toledo, Ohio
Feb 19, 2000		Miami (OH)	W 60–57 ^{OT}	17–8 (9–7)	Worthen Arena; Muncie, Indiana
Feb 24, 2000		at Central Michigan	W 91–80	18–8 (10–7)	Rose Arena; Mount Pleasant, Michigan
Feb 26, 2000		at Western Michigan	W 91–82	19–8 (11–7)	University Arena; Kalamazoo, Michigan
MAC tournament
Mar 5, 2000*		vs. Toledo; Quarterfinals	W 64–63 ^{OT}	20–8	Gund Arena; Cleveland, Ohio
Mar 6, 2000*		vs. Ohio; Semifinals	W 70–67	21–8	Gund Arena; Cleveland, Ohio
Mar 8, 2000*		vs. Miami (OH); Championship game	W 61–58	22–8	Gund Arena; Cleveland, Ohio
NCAA tournament
Mar 16, 2000*	(11 MW)	vs. (6 MW) UCLA; First Round	L 57–65	22–9	Hubert H. Humphrey Metrodome; Minneapolis, Minnesota
*Non-conference game. ^{#}Rankings from AP poll. (#) Tournament seedings in parentheses. MW=Midwest. All times are in Eastern Time.
