= Ray McCallum =

American basketball coach (born 1961)

Current position
- Title: Associate head coach
- Team: Tulane
- Conference: American Conference

Biographical details
- Born: March 6, 1961 (age 65); West Memphis, Arkansas, U.S.

Playing career
- 1979–1983: Ball State

Coaching career (HC unless noted)
- 1983–1984: Ball State (assistant)
- 1984–1993: Wisconsin (assistant)
- 1993: Michigan (assistant)
- 1993–2000: Ball State
- 2000–2004: Houston
- 2004–2006: Oklahoma (assistant)
- 2006–2008: Indiana (assistant)
- 2008–2016: Detroit
- 2016–2019: Georgia State (assistant)
- 2019–present: Tulane (associate HC)

Head coaching record
- Overall: 300–281 (.516)
- Tournaments: 0–3 (NCAA Division I); 0–3 (NIT)

Accomplishments and honors

Championships
- 2 MAC tournament (1995, 2000); MAC regular season (1998); Horizon tournament (2012)

Awards
- Frances Pomeroy Naismith Award (1983); MAC Player of the Year (1983); No. 10 retired by Ball State Cardinals

Ray Michael McCallum Sr. (born March 6, 1961) is an American college basketball coach who is currently the associate head coach for Tulane. He previously served as the head coach for Ball State, Houston, and Detroit Mercy, with stints as an assistant coach at several other schools.

== Early life ==
McCallum won Indiana High School Athletic Association Championships in both his junior and senior year at Muncie Central High School. At Ball State, he scored 2,109 points during his career and was Player of the Year in the Mid-American Conference his senior year.

In 1983 he was awarded the Frances Pomeroy Naismith Award, which is an annual college basketball award in the United States intended to honor shorter–than–average players who excel on the court despite their size. He was drafted by the Indiana Pacers in the 8th round of the 1983 draft with the 164th pick overall. His jersey (10) is one of two numbers retired at Ball State, along with Bonzi Wells's 42.

== Coaching career ==
McCallum's coaching record at Ball State was 126–76. He guided the Cardinals to two NCAA appearances during his tenure.

McCallum also served as an assistant coach at Wisconsin, Michigan and Oklahoma. From 2000 until 2004, he served as head coach at Houston, where his record was 44–73.

== Head coaching record ==
Record table
Season	Team	Overall	Conference	Standing	Postseason
Ball State Cardinals (Mid-American Conference) (1993–2000)
1993–94	Ball State	16–12	11–7	4th	
1994–95	Ball State	19–11	11–7	4th	NCAA Division I First Round
1995–96	Ball State	16–12	11–7	T–4th	
1996–97	Ball State	16–13	9–9	T–5th	
1997–98	Ball State	21–8	14–4	T–1st (West)	NIT First Round
1998–99	Ball State	16–11	10–8	2nd (West)	
1999–00	Ball State	22–9	11–7	T–1st (West)	NCAA Division I First Round
Ball State:		126–76 (.624)	77–49 (.611)		
Houston Cougars (Conference USA) (2000–2004)
2000–01	Houston	9–20	6–10	5th (National)	
2001–02	Houston	18–15	9–7	2nd (National)	NIT Opening Round
2002–03	Houston	8–20	6–10	4th (National)	
2003–04	Houston	9–18	3–13	13th	
Houston:		44–73 (.376)	24–40 (.375)		
Detroit Titans (Horizon League) (2008–2016)
2008–09	Detroit	7–23	2–16	10th	
2009–10	Detroit	20–14	9–9	7th	
2010–11	Detroit	17–16	10–8	T–5th	
2011–12	Detroit	22–14	11–7	T–3rd	NCAA Division I First Round
2012–13	Detroit	20–13	12–4	2nd	NIT First Round
2013–14	Detroit	13–19	6–10	T–7th	
2014–15	Detroit	15–18	7–9	6th	
2015–16	Detroit	16–15	9–9	6th	
Detroit:		130–132 (.496)	66–72 (.478)		
Total:		300–281 (.516)			
National champion Postseason invitational champion Conference regular season champion Conference regular season and conference tournament champion Division regular season champion Division regular season and conference tournament champion Conference tournament champion

Source: NCAA Men's Basketball Coaches Career

== Personal life ==
McCallum's son, Ray McCallum, Jr., played basketball for the University of Detroit Mercy for three seasons. He was considered a blue chip prospect in high school and had offers to play for more prestigious institutions, but decided to play for his father. McCallum, Jr. was drafted by the Sacramento Kings in the second round of the 2013 NBA draft.
