= 2000 MAC men's basketball tournament =

- Classification: Division I
- Season: 1999–00
- Teams: 13
- Site: Gund Arena; Cleveland, Ohio
- Champions: Ball State (7th title)
- Winning coach: Ray McCallum (2nd title)
- MVP: Duane Clemens (Ball State)
- MAC men's basketball tournaments

The 2000 MAC men's basketball tournament, a part of the 1999–2000 NCAA Division I men's basketball season, took place at Gund Arena in Cleveland to determine the Mid-American Conference's automatic bid to the 2000 NCAA tournament. The 2000 tournament was the first MAC Tournament to be held in Cleveland after a four-year stint in Toledo, Ohio, and also marked the first year all conference members were invited to participate after having previously limited participation to the top eight teams in the conference standings. It was a single-elimination tournament with four rounds and the three highest seeds received first-round byes. Bowling Green, the MAC regular season winner, received the number one seed in the tournament. MAC West Division champion Ball State won the tournament, their 7th conference tournament title and first since 1995.

1999–2000 Mid-American Conference men's basketball standings
	Conf.				Overall
Team	W		L	PCT	W		L	PCT
East
Bowling Green	14	–	4	.778	22	–	8	.733
Kent State	13	–	5	.722	23	–	8	.742
Akron	11	–	7	.611	17	–	11	.607
Marshall	11	–	7	.611	21	–	9	.700
Ohio	11	–	7	.611	20	–	13	.606
Miami	8	–	10	.444	15	–	15	.500
Buffalo	3	–	15	.167	5	–	23	.179
West
Ball State†	11	–	7	.611	22	–	9	.710
Toledo	11	–	7	.611	18	–	13	.581
Eastern Michigan	9	–	9	.500	15	–	13	.536
Northern Illinois	7	–	11	.389	13	–	15	.464
Western Michigan	6	–	12	.333	10	–	18	.357
Central Michigan	2	–	16	.111	6	–	23	.207
† 2000 MAC tournament winner As of Rankings from AP Poll

== Tournament ==
=== Seeds ===
1. Bowling Green
2. Ball State
3. Kent State
4. Akron
5. Marshall
6. Ohio
7. Toledo
8. Eastern Michigan
9. Miami
10. Northern Illinois
11. Western Michigan
12. Buffalo
13. Central Michigan

=== Bracket ===
First round
8	Eastern Michigan	51
9	Miami (OH)	64
4	Akron	73
13	Central Michigan	75
5	Marshall	83
12	Buffalo	66
7	Toledo	68**
10	Northern Illinois	64
6	Ohio	77
11	Western Michigan	52

Quarterfinals
1	Bowling Green	56
9	Miami (OH)	58*
13	Central Michigan	56
5	Marshall	58
2	Ball State	64
7	Toledo	63
3	Kent State	68
6	Ohio	69

Semifinals
9	Miami (OH)	69
5	Marshall	63
2	Ball State	70
6	Ohio	67

Championship
9	Miami (OH)	58
2	Ball State	61

* – Denotes overtime period
