= 1999–2000 Ohio Bobcats men's basketball team =

American college basketball season

1999–2000 Ohio Bobcats men's basketball
- Conference: Mid-American Conference
- >East Division
- Record: 20–13 (11–7 MAC)
- Head coach: Larry Hunter (11th season)
- Assistant coaches: Geno Ford; John Rhodes
- Home arena: Convocation Center

1999–2000 Mid-American Conference men's basketball standings
	Conf.				Overall
Team	W		L	PCT	W		L	PCT
East
Bowling Green	14	–	4	.778	22	–	8	.733
Kent State	13	–	5	.722	23	–	8	.742
Akron	11	–	7	.611	17	–	11	.607
Marshall	11	–	7	.611	21	–	9	.700
Ohio	11	–	7	.611	20	–	13	.606
Miami	8	–	10	.444	15	–	15	.500
Buffalo	3	–	15	.167	5	–	23	.179
West
Ball State†	11	–	7	.611	22	–	9	.710
Toledo	11	–	7	.611	18	–	13	.581
Eastern Michigan	9	–	9	.500	15	–	13	.536
Northern Illinois	7	–	11	.389	13	–	15	.464
Western Michigan	6	–	12	.333	10	–	18	.357
Central Michigan	2	–	16	.111	6	–	23	.207
† 2000 MAC tournament winner As of Rankings from AP Poll

The 1999-00 Ohio Bobcats men's basketball team represented Ohio University in the college basketball season of 1999–2000. The team was coached by Larry Hunter and played their home games at the Convocation Center.

== Roster ==
1999–2000 Ohio Bobcats men's basketball team
Players
Coaches

Pos.	#	Name	Height	Weight	Year	Hometown
G/F	30	Sanjay Adell	6 ft 6 in (1.98 m)	230 lb (104 kg)	Sr	Milwaukee, WI
G	12	Jason Crawford	6 ft 4 in (1.93 m)	220 lb (100 kg)	So	Cincinnati, OH
G	25	Steve Esterkamp	6 ft 6 in (1.98 m)	200 lb (91 kg)	Fr	Cincinnati, OH
F	40	Patrick Flomo	6 ft 9 in (2.06 m)	205 lb (93 kg)	Fr	Columbus, OH
G	4	Dustin Ford	5 ft 10 in (1.78 m)	180 lb (82 kg)	Jr	Cambridge, OH
G	3	Adam Howell	6 ft 3 in (1.91 m)	185 lb (84 kg)	Fr	Lexington, KY
F	34	Brandon Hunter	6 ft 7 in (2.01 m)	260 lb (118 kg)	Fr	Cincinnati, OH
C	21	Asa Jewett	6 ft 11 in (2.11 m)	240 lb (109 kg)	Fr	Blue Creek, OH
G/F	5	Anthony Jones	6 ft 4 in (1.93 m)	200 lb (91 kg)	Fr	Austin, TX
C	42	Shaun McVicker	6 ft 9 in (2.06 m)	250 lb (113 kg)	Fr	New Concord, OH
G	10	Corey Reed	5 ft 10 in (1.78 m)	175 lb (79 kg)	Sr	Milwaukee, WI
F	33	Shaun Stonerook	6 ft 8 in (2.03 m)	230 lb (104 kg)	Sr	Westerville, OH

Head coach

- Larry Hunter

Assistant coach(es)

- Geno Ford
- John Rhodes
- Bill Fournier

Legend

- (C) Team captain
- (S) Suspended
- (I) Ineligible
- (W) Walk-on
- Injured
- Current redshirt

Roster
Last update: June 30, 2014

== Preseason ==
The preseason poll was announced by the league office on October 21, 1999.

=== Preseason men's basketball poll ===
(First place votes in parentheses)

==== East Division ====
1. Akron (15) 230
2. Kent State (17) 220
3. Bowling Green 173
4. Marshall (2) 150
5. Ohio (4) 146
6. Miami 103
7. Buffalo 40

==== West Division ====
1. Toledo (20) 189
2. Ball State (11) 162
3. Northern Illinois (3) 123
4. Western Michigan (3) 117
5. Central Michigan (1) 116
6. Eastern Michigan 87

==== Tournament champs ====
Kent State (15), Akron (12), Bowling Green (3), Ohio (4), Marshall (2), Toledo (1), Northern Illinois (1)

== Schedule and results ==
Date time, TV	Rank^{#}	Opponent^{#}	Result	Record	Site (attendance) city, state
Regular Season
11/20/99*; 8:00 pm		Cleveland State	W 87–82	1–0	Convocation Center (6,213); Athens, OH
11/26/99*; 8:30 pm		at Princeton	W 68–60	2–0	Jadwin Gymnasium (5,431); Princeton, NJ
11/30/99*; 7:00 pm		George Washington	W 95–77	3–0	Convocation Center (5,118); Athens, OH
12/3/99*; 7:05 pm		vs. Houston; Hawkeye Invitational 1st Round	W 73–65	4–0	Carver-Hawkeye Arena (13,155); Iowa City, IA
12/4/99*; 9:05 pm		at Iowa; Hawkeye Invitational Championship Game	L 66–86	4–1	Carver-Hawkeye Arena (13,375); Iowa City, IA
12/16/99; 2:00 pm		at Eastern Michigan	L 55–65	4–2 (0–1)	Convocation Center (1,450); Ypsilanti, MI
12/11/99*; 7:00 pm		at West Virginia	W 75–64	5–2 (0–1)	WVU Coliseum (5,055); Morgantown, WV
12/13/99*; 7:00 pm		Central Florida	W 77–57	6–2 (0–1)	Convocation Center (6,056); Athens, OH
12/18/99; 8:00 pm		Toledo	W 66–57	7–2 (1–1)	Convocation Center (6,592); Athens, OH
12/22/99*; 11:00 pm		Portland	L 66–68	7–3 (1–1)	Chiles Center (1,098); Portland, OR
12/28/99*; 10:00 pm		vs. Gonzaga; Rainbow Classic 1st Round	L 55–83	7–4 (1–1)	Stan Sheriff Center (7,358); Honolulu, HI
12/29/99*; 6:30 pm		vs. No. 19 Wake Forest; Rainbow Classic 2nd Round	L 78–84 ^{2OT}	7–5 (1–1)	Stan Sheriff Center (839); Honolulu, HI
12/30/99; 4:00 pm		vs. Bradley; Rainbow Classic 3rd Round	W 63–52	8–5 (1–1)	Stan Sheriff Center (849); Honolulu, HI
MAC regular season
1/5/00; 7:00 pm		at Kent State	L 69–73 ^{2OT}	8–6 (1–2)	MAC Center (3,117); Kent, OH
1/8/00; 12:00 pm		at Miami (OH)	W 85–67	9–6 (2–2)	Millet Hall (3,517); Oxford, OH
1/11/00; 7:00 pm		Akron	L 60–62	9–7 (2–3)	Convocation Center (7,108); Athens, OH
1/14/00*; 11:59 pm		at No. 1 Cincinnati	L 59–73	9–8 (2–3)	Fifth Third Arena (13,176); Cincinnati, OH
1/17/00; 4:00 pm		Buffalo	W 86–71	10–8 (3–3)	Convocation Center (6,318); Athens, OH
1/20/09; 7:00 pm		at Central Michigan	W 93–80	11–8 (4–3)	McGuirk Arena (2,447); Mount Pleasant, MI
1/22/00; 2:00 pm		Western Michigan	L 74–78 ^{OT}	11–9 (4–4)	Convocation Center (12,118); Athens, OH
1/26/00; 7:00 pm		Ball State	W 64–53	12–9 (5–4)	Convocation Center (6,018); Athens, OH
1/29/00; 4:00 pm		Marshall	W 77–53	13–9 (6–4)	Convocation Center (11,913); Athens, OH
2/3/00; 8:05 pm		at Northern Illinois	W 76–61	14–9 (7–4)	Convocation Center (1,868); DeKalb, IL
2/5/00; 8:05 pm		at Bowling Green	L 69–73	14–10 (7–5)	Stroh Center (3,907); Bowling Green, OH
2/09/00; 7:00 pm		Central Michigan	W 83–77 ^{OT}	15–10 (8–5)	Convocation Center (7,189); Athens, OH
2/12/00; 4:00 pm		at Akron	L 79–81 ^{OT}	15–11 (8–6)	Rhodes Arena (4,453); Akron, OH
2/14/00; 7:00 pm		at Marshall	L 72–78	15–12 (8–7)	Cam Henderson Center (4,809); Huntington, WV
2/21/00; 8:00 pm		Miami (OH)	W 68–65	16–12 (9–7)	Convocation Center (9,384); Athens, OH
2/23/00; 7:30 pm		at Buffalo	W 82–62	17–12 (10–7)	Alumni Arena (713); Buffalo, NY
2/26/00; 12:00 pm		Kent State	W 81–71	18–12 (11–7)	Convocation Center (7,519); Athens, OH
MAC tournament
3/1/00; 7:00 pm		Western Michigan; MAC Tournament 1st Round	W 77–52	19–12 (11–7)	Convocation Center (5,614); Athens, OH
3/5/00; 9:30 pm		vs. Kent State; MAC Tournament quarterfinals	W 69–68	20–12 (11–7)	Gund Arena (8,127); Cleveland, OH
3/5/00; 9:30		vs. Ball State; MAC Tournament semifinals	L 67–70	20–13 (11–7)	Gund Arena (5,562); Cleveland, OH
*Non-conference game. ^{#}Rankings from AP Poll. (#) Tournament seedings in parentheses. All times are in Eastern.

== Statistics ==
=== Team statistics ===
Final 1999–2000 statistics

Record	Ohio	OPP
Scoring	2386	2255
Scoring Average	72.30	68.33
Field goals – Att	782–1804	788–1854
3-pt. Field goals – Att	221–647	171–511
Free throws – Att	601–895	508–750
Rebounds	1280	1096
Assists	517	417
Turnovers	565	519
Steals	243	256
Blocked Shots	103	79

=== Player statistics ===
			Minutes		Scoring		Total FGs			3-point FGs			Free-Throws			Rebounds								
Player	GP	GS	Tot	Avg	Pts	Avg	FG	FGA	Pct	3FG	3FA	Pct	FT	FTA	Pct	Off	Def	Tot	Avg	A	PF	TO	Stl	Blk
Sanjay Adell	33	-	-	-	532	16.1	167	411	0.406	53	155	0.342	145	204	0.711	0	0	169	5.1	63	0	0	26	16
Shaun Stonerook	33	-	-	-	518	15.7	147	322	0.457	44	121	0.364	180	246	0.732	0	0	387	11.7	140	0	133	57	15
Brandon Hunter	33	-	-	-	374	11.4	149	290	0.514	0	2	0	76	138	0.551	0	0	206	4.3	35	93	91	19	11
Dustin Ford	33	-	-	-	278	11.3	88	220	0.4	67	167	0.401	35	53	0.66	0	0	54	6.2	101	0	0	33	5
Steve Esterkamp	33	-	-	-	267	8.4	79	219	0.361	42	129	0.326	67	86	0.779	0	0	91	1.6	31	0	0	28	2
Anthony Jones	13	-	-	-	148	8.1	50	128	0.391	6	35	0.171	42	64	0.656	0	0	56	2.8	28	0	0	35	6
Patrick Flomo	31	-	-	-	113	3.6	49	72	0.681	0	1	0	15	34	0.441	0	0	70	2.3	10	0	0	8	37
Corey Reed	33	-	-	-	70	2.1	25	65	0.385	0	4	0	20	36	0.556	0	0	70	2.1	86	0	0	27	9
Jason Crawford	24	-	-	-	29	1.3	11	30	0.367	2	11	0.182	5	8	0.625	0	0	22	2	8	0	0	5	0
Adam Howell	24	-	-	-	24	1.2	8	28	0.286	7	20	0.35	1	2	0.5	0	0	7	0.9	6	0	0	3	0
Shaun McVicker	19	-	-	-	24	1	7	15	0.467	0	2	0	10	18	0.556	0	0	38	0.3	9	0	0	2	2
Asa Jewett	11	-	-	-	9	0.8	2	4	0.5	0	0	0	5	6	0.833	0	0	2	0.2	0	0	0	0	0
Total	33	-	-	-	2386	72.3	782	1804	0.433	221	647	0.342	601	895	0.672	441	839	1280	38.8	517	694	565	243	103
Opponents	33	-	-	-	2255	68.3	788	1854	0.425	171	511	0.335	508	750	0.489	360	736	1096	33.2	417	745	519	256	79

Legend
GP	Games played	GS	Games started	Avg	Average per game
FG	Field-goals made	FGA	Field-goal attempts	Off	Offensive rebounds
Def	Defensive rebounds	A	Assists	TO	Turnovers
Blk	Blocks	Stl	Steals	High	Team high

== Awards and honors ==
=== All-MAC Awards ===
Postseason All-MAC teams
Team	Player	Position	Year
All-MAC First Team	Shaun Stonerook	F	Sr.
All-MAC Honorable Mention	Sanjay Adell	G	Sr.
All-MAC First team	Brandon Hunter	F	Fr.
