= Harvey Knuckles =

American basketball player

Personal information
- Born: October 3, 1958 (age 68) Tyronza, Arkansas, U.S.
- Listed height: 6 ft 6 in (1.98 m)
- Listed weight: 185 lb (84 kg)

Career information
- High school: St. Catherine's (Racine, Wisconsin)
- College: Toledo (1977–1981)
- NBA draft: 1981: 2nd round, 39th overall pick
- Drafted by: Los Angeles Lakers
- Position: Small forward

Career highlights
- MAC Player of the Year (1981); First-team All-MAC (1981)
- Stats at Basketball Reference

Harvey Knuckles (born October 3, 1958) is an American former basketball player. He was a second round draft pick in the 1981 NBA draft and played professionally in the United States and Europe.

Knuckles, a 6'6" small forward, played collegiately at the University of Toledo from 1977 to 1981, where he led the Rockets to two consecutive NCAA tournament berths (1979, 1980). Knuckles scored 1,488 points (12.9 per game) in his Toledo career. As a senior in 1980–81, Knuckles averaged 22 points and 7.3 rebounds per game and was named Mid-American Conference Player of the Year.

After graduating from Toledo, Knuckles was drafted by the Los Angeles Lakers in the second round of the 1981 NBA Draft. He failed to make the team, instead playing in the Continental Basketball Association and then in England, Switzerland and France. After stints as an assistant at Toledo and working in a bank, Knuckles returned to France, where he played professionally late into his forties.
