= Mid-American Conference Men's Basketball Player of the Year =

Men's college basketball award

MAC Men's Basketball Player of the Year
- Awarded for: the most outstanding basketball player in the Mid-American Conference
- Country: United States

History
- First award: 1968
- Most recent: Peter Suder, Miami

The Mid-American Conference Men's Basketball Player of the Year is an award given to the most outstanding men's basketball player in the Mid-American Conference (MAC). The award was first given following the 1967–68 season. Four players have won the award multiple times: Tom Kozelko, Ron Harper, Gary Trent and Bonzi Wells. Trent is the only player to have been honored as player of the year three times (1993–95). There have been no ties, nor has any player from the MAC ever won any of the national player of the year awards. Through 2026, Ohio has the most all-time winners with 11. Toledo is second with eight winners. All current members of the MAC have had at least one winner except UMass, which played its first MAC season in 2025–26.

== Key ==
†	Co-Players of the Year
*	Awarded a national player of the year award that same season: Helms Foundation College Basketball Player of the Year (1904–05 to 1978–79); UPI College Basketball Player of the Year (1954–55 to 1995–96); Oscar Robertson Trophy (1958–59 to present); Naismith College Player of the Year (1968–69 to present); John R. Wooden Award (1976–77 to present)
Player (X)	Denotes the number of times the player has been awarded the MAC Player of the Year award at that point

== Winners ==
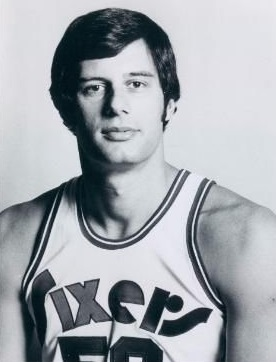
Steve Mix, Toledo, 1969

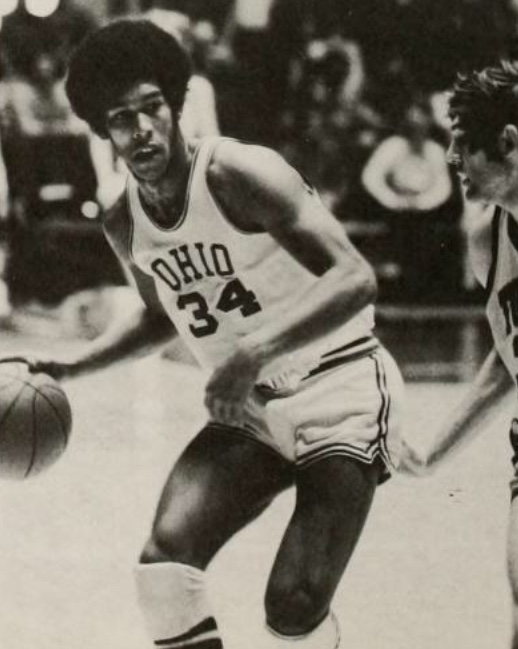
Walter Luckett, Ohio, 1974

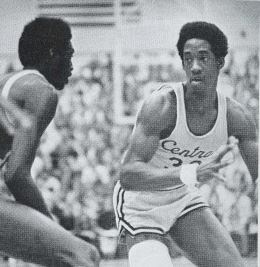
Dan Roundfield (r), Central Michigan, 1975

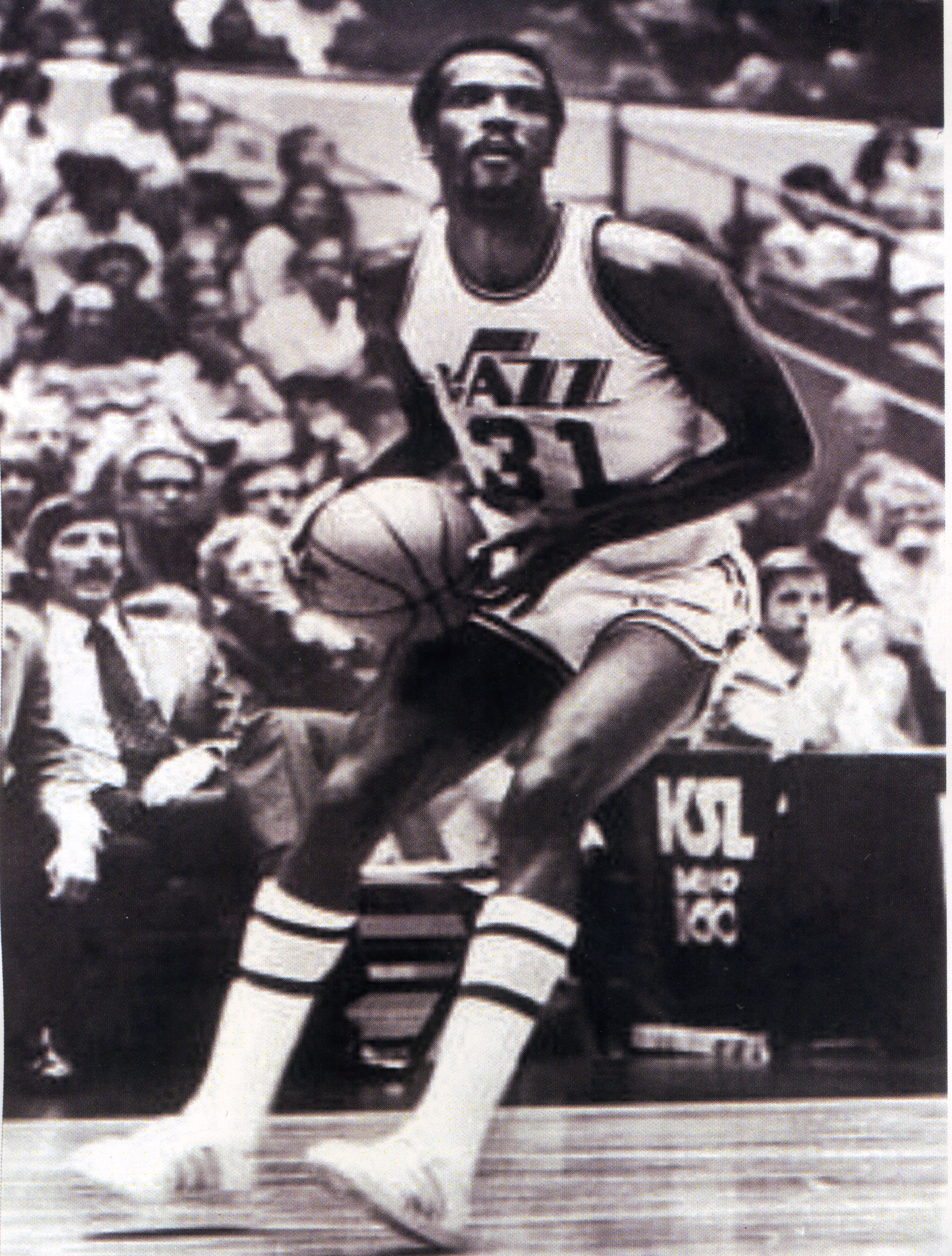
Paul Dawkins, Northern Illinois, 1979

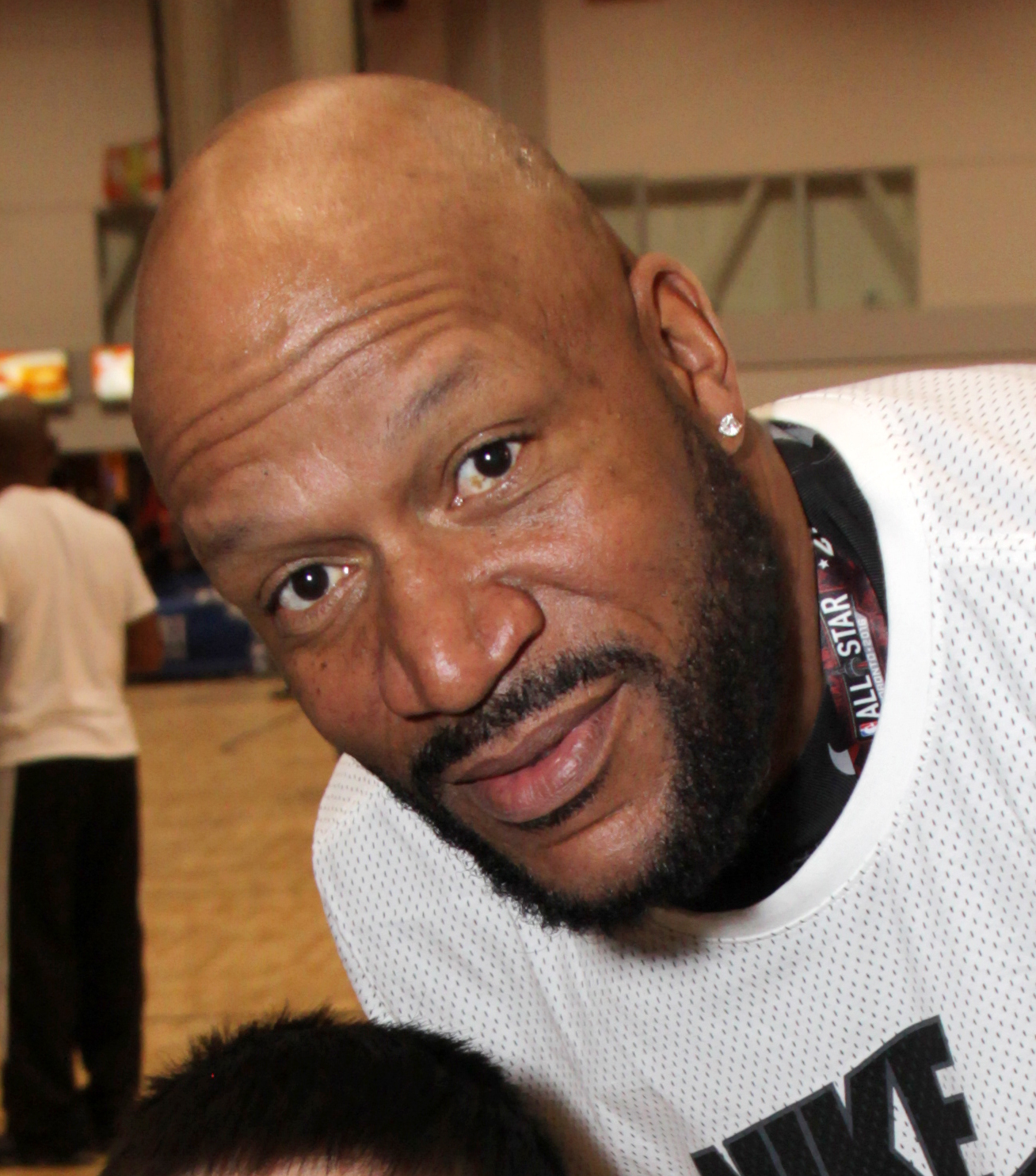
Ron Harper, Miami, 1985 and 1986

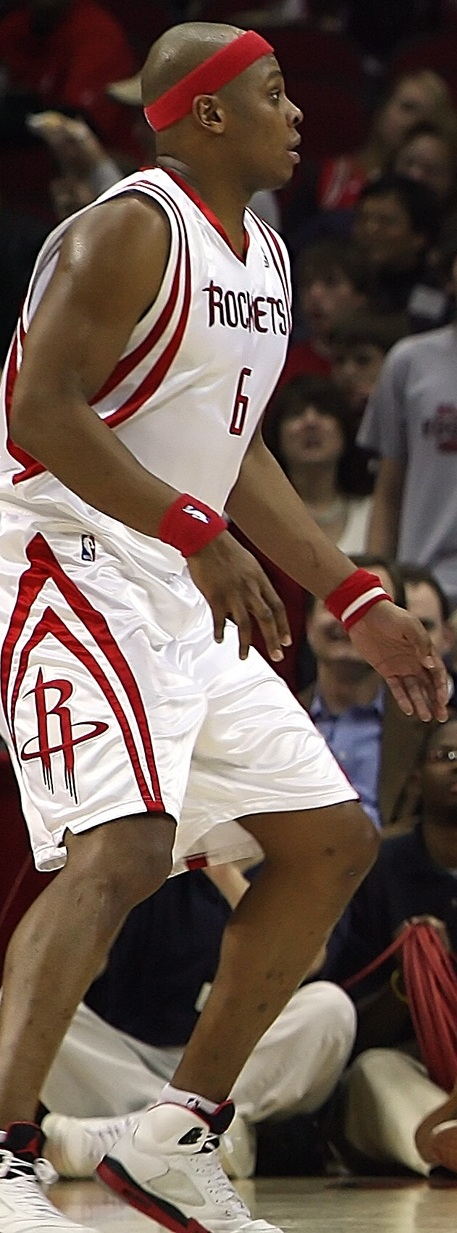
Bonzi Wells, Ball State, 1996 and 1998

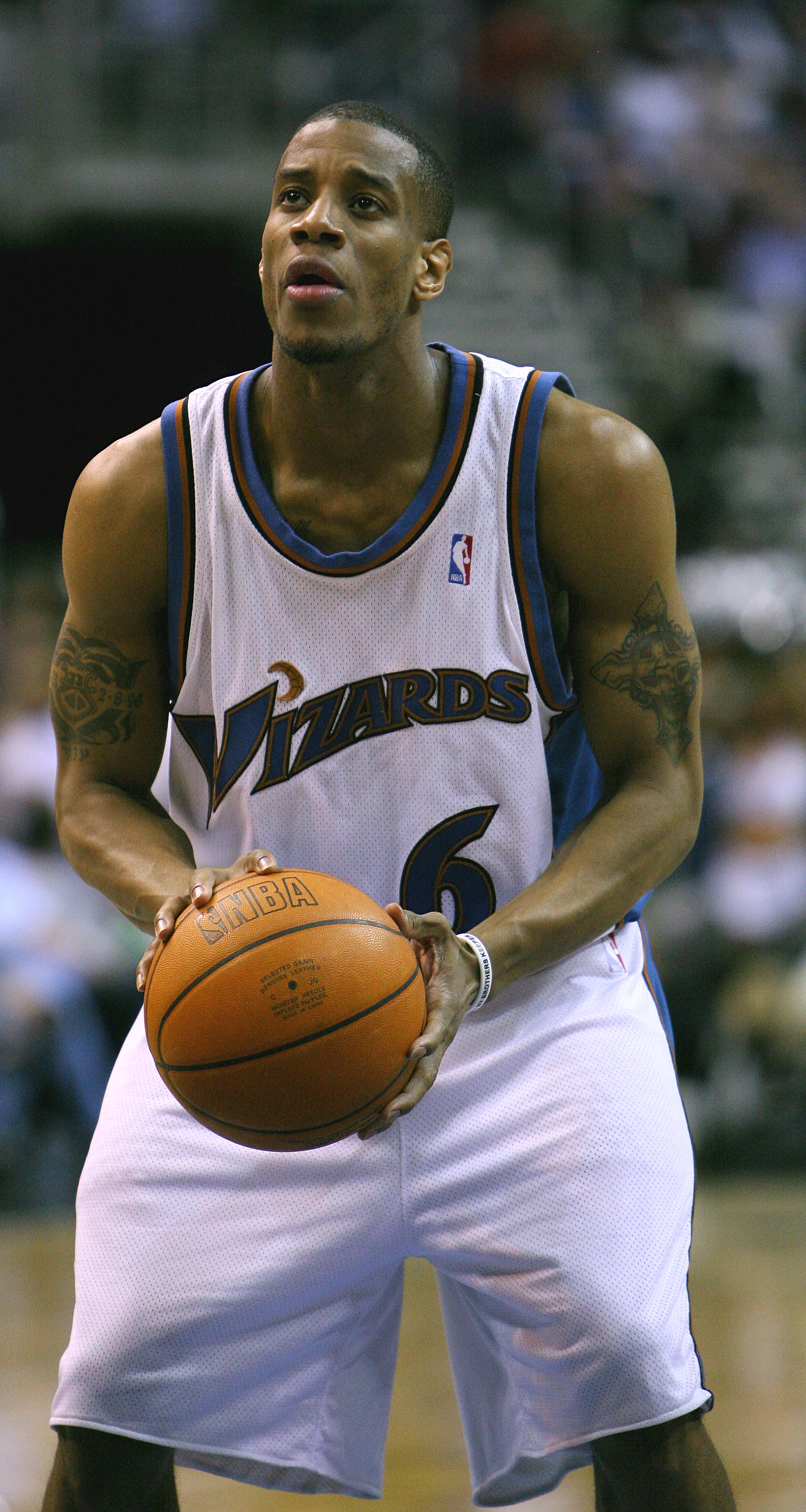
Antonio Daniels, Bowling Green, 1997

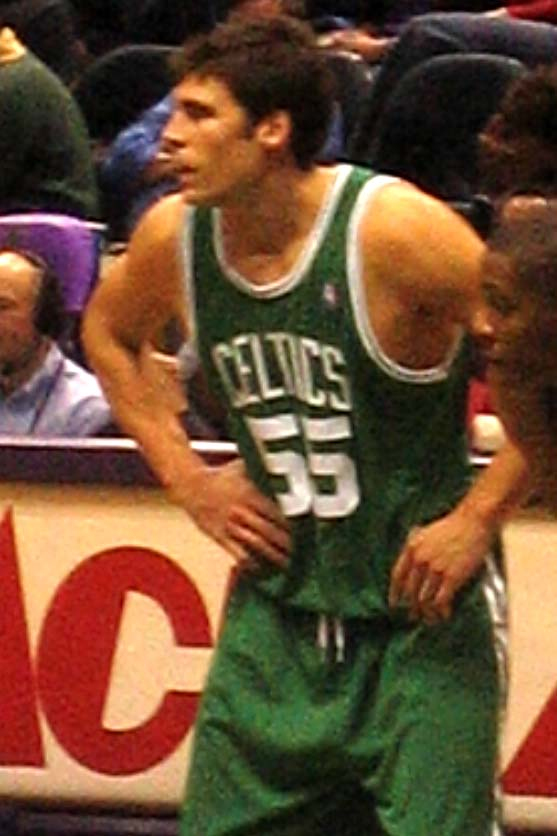
Wally Szczerbiak, Miami, 1999

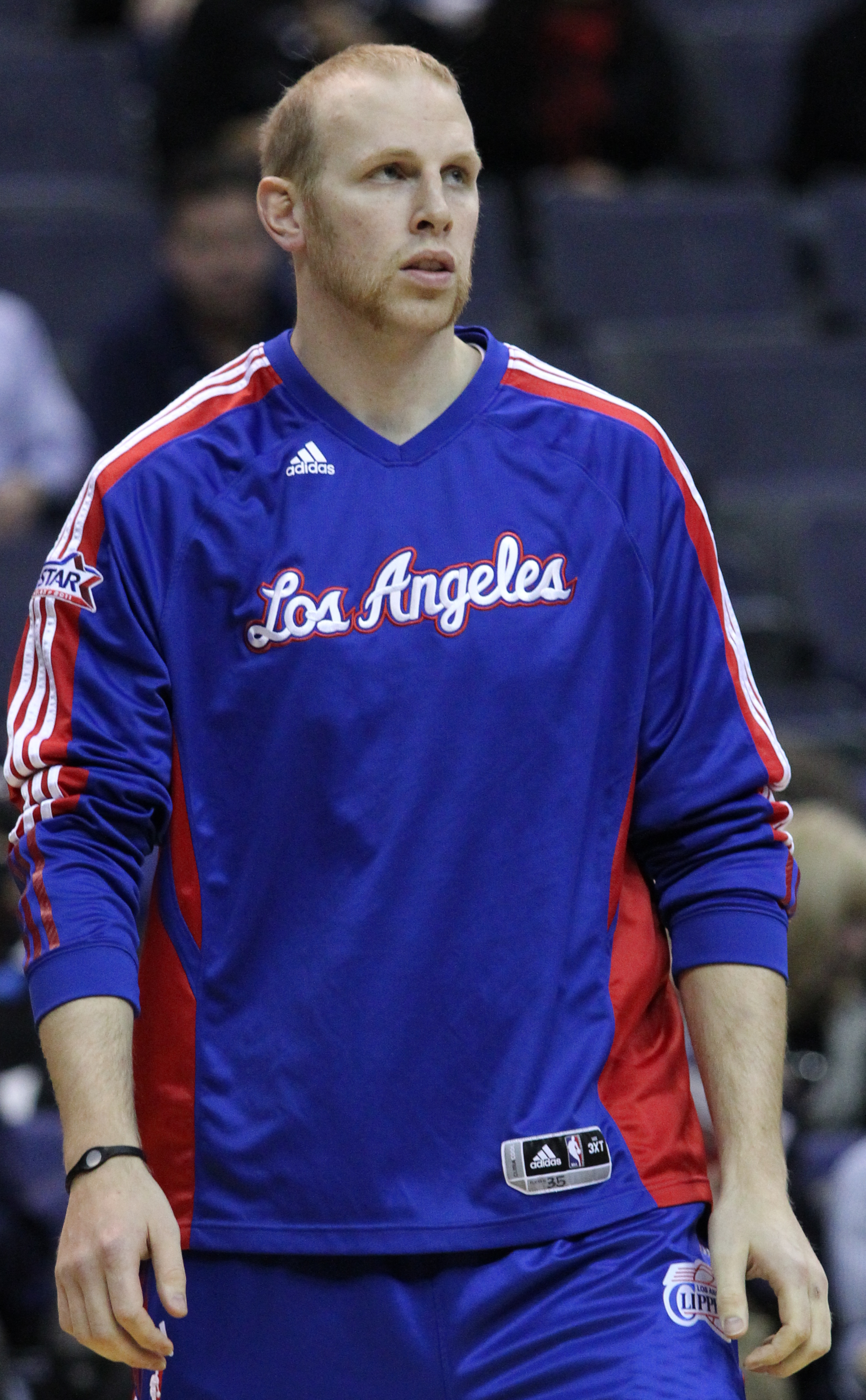
Chris Kaman, Central Michigan, 2003

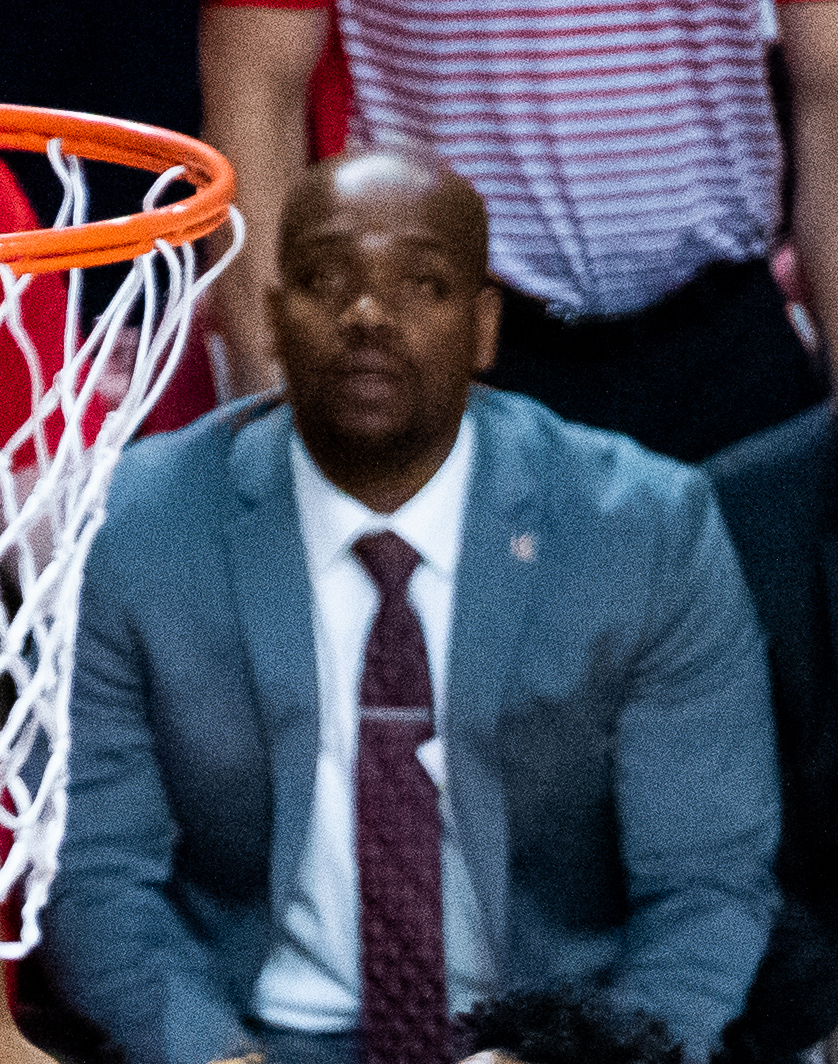
DeAndre Haynes, Kent State, 2006

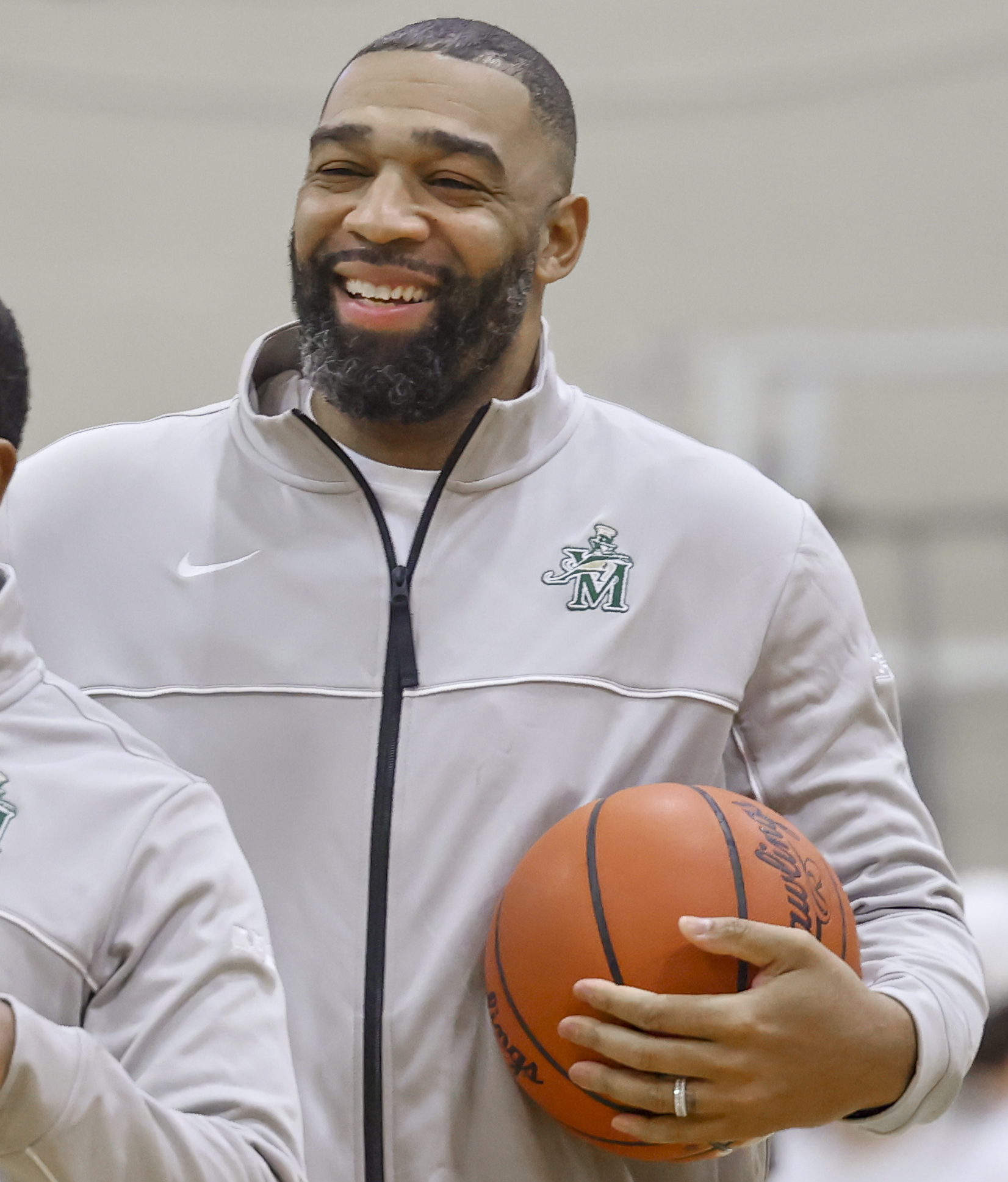
Romeo Travis, Akron, 2007

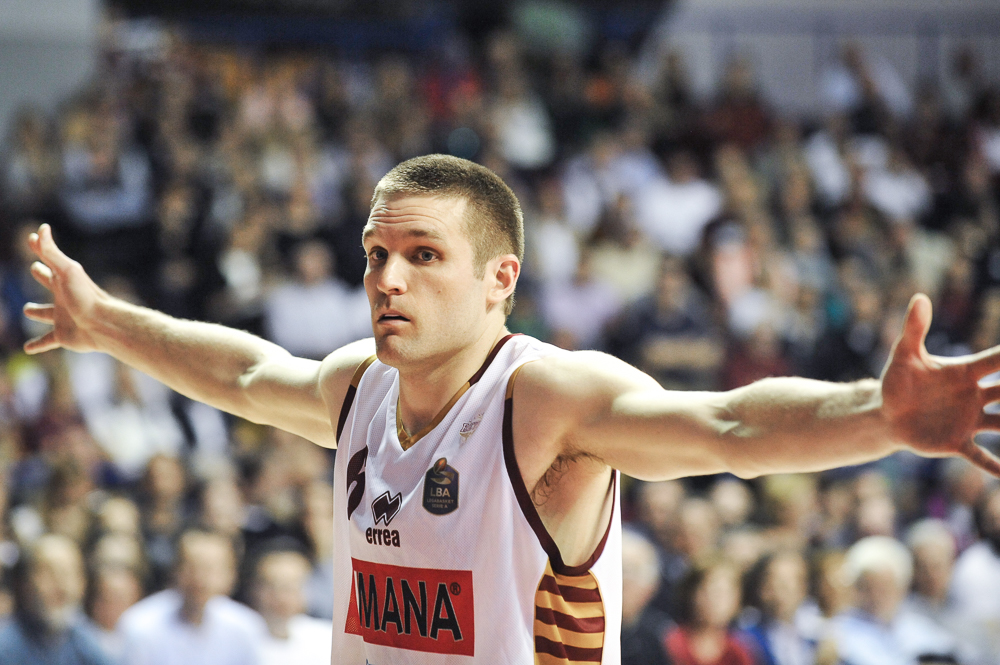
Michael Bramos, Miami, 2009

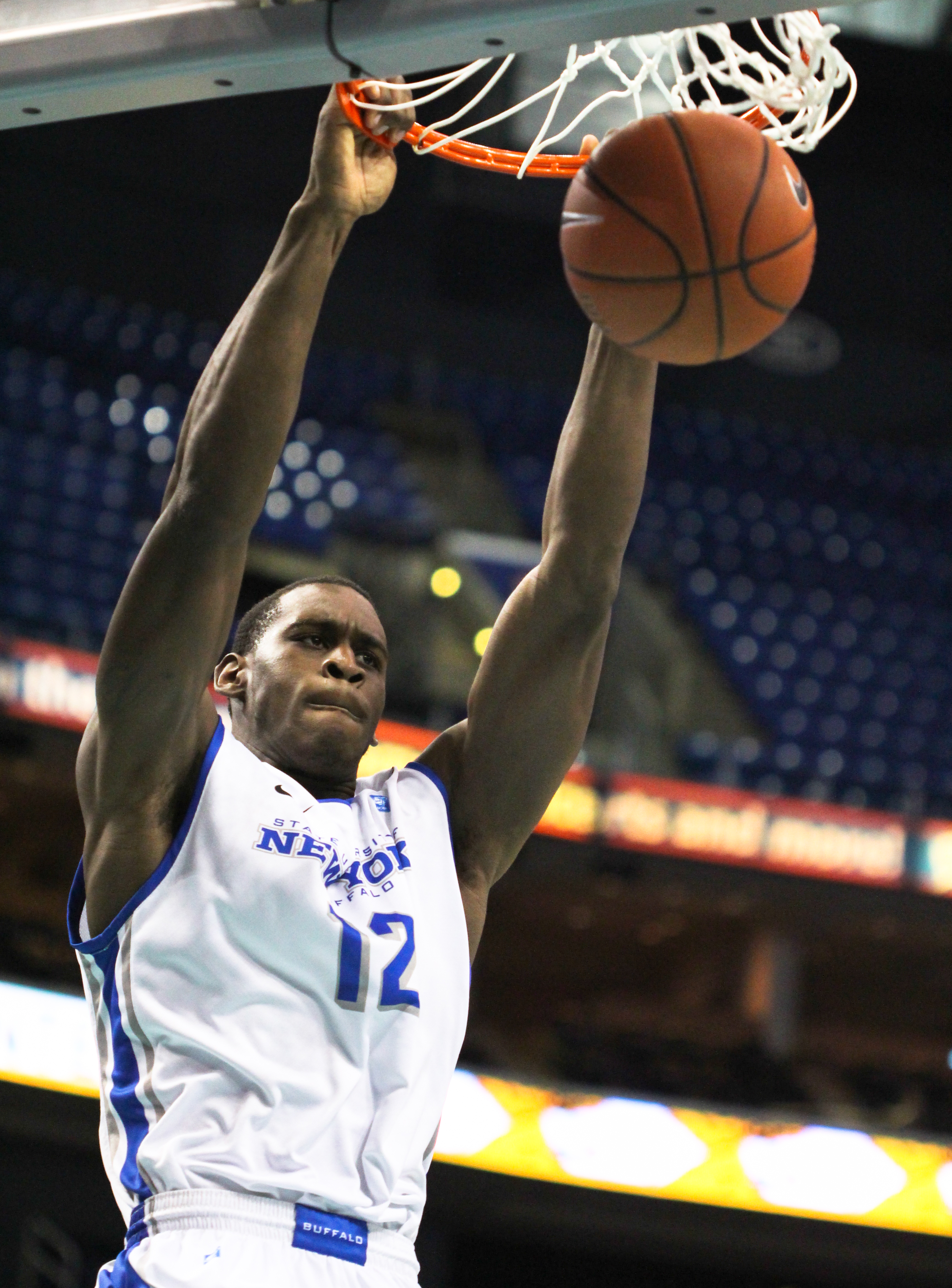
Javon McCrea, Buffalo, 2014

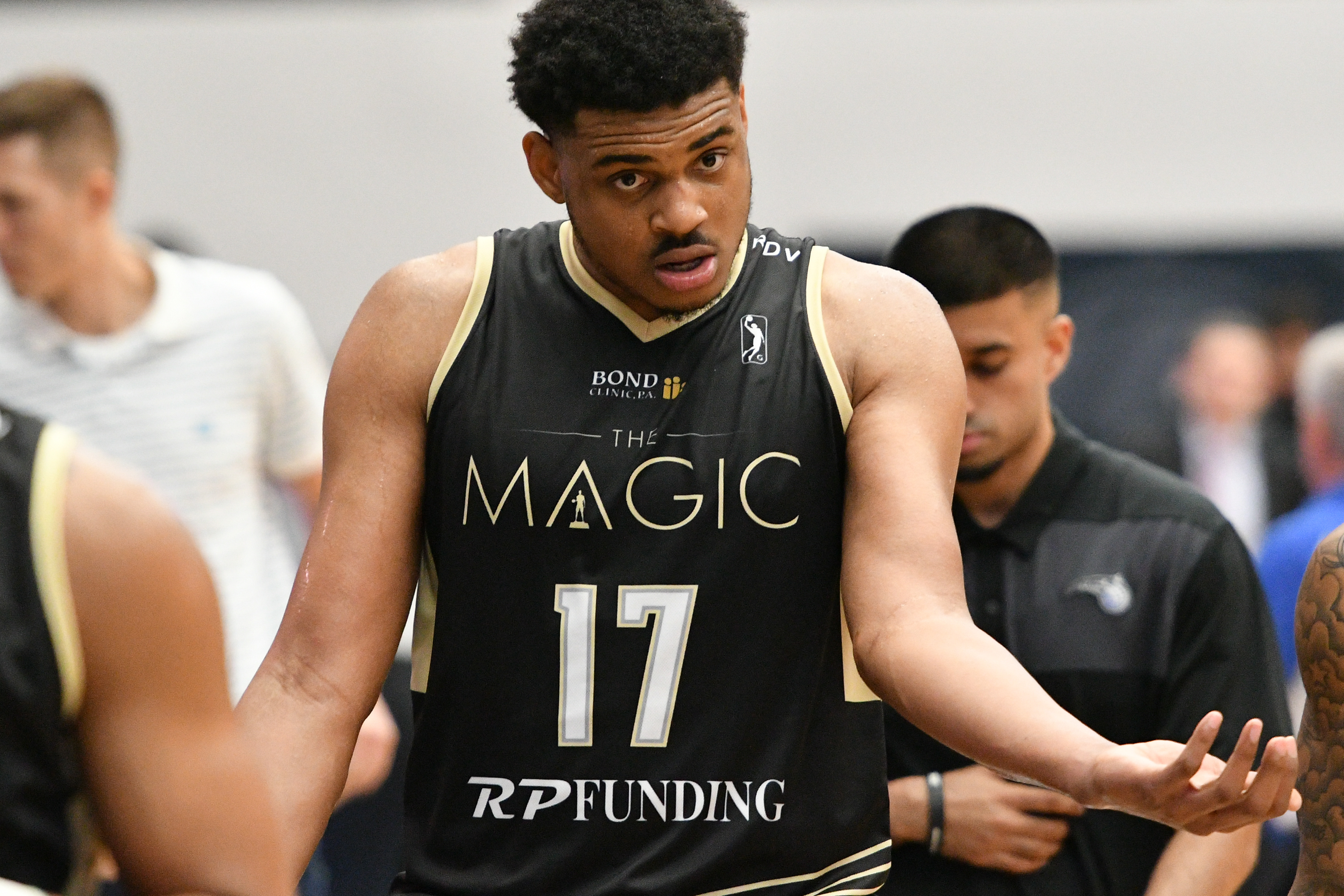
Antonio Campbell, Ohio, 2016

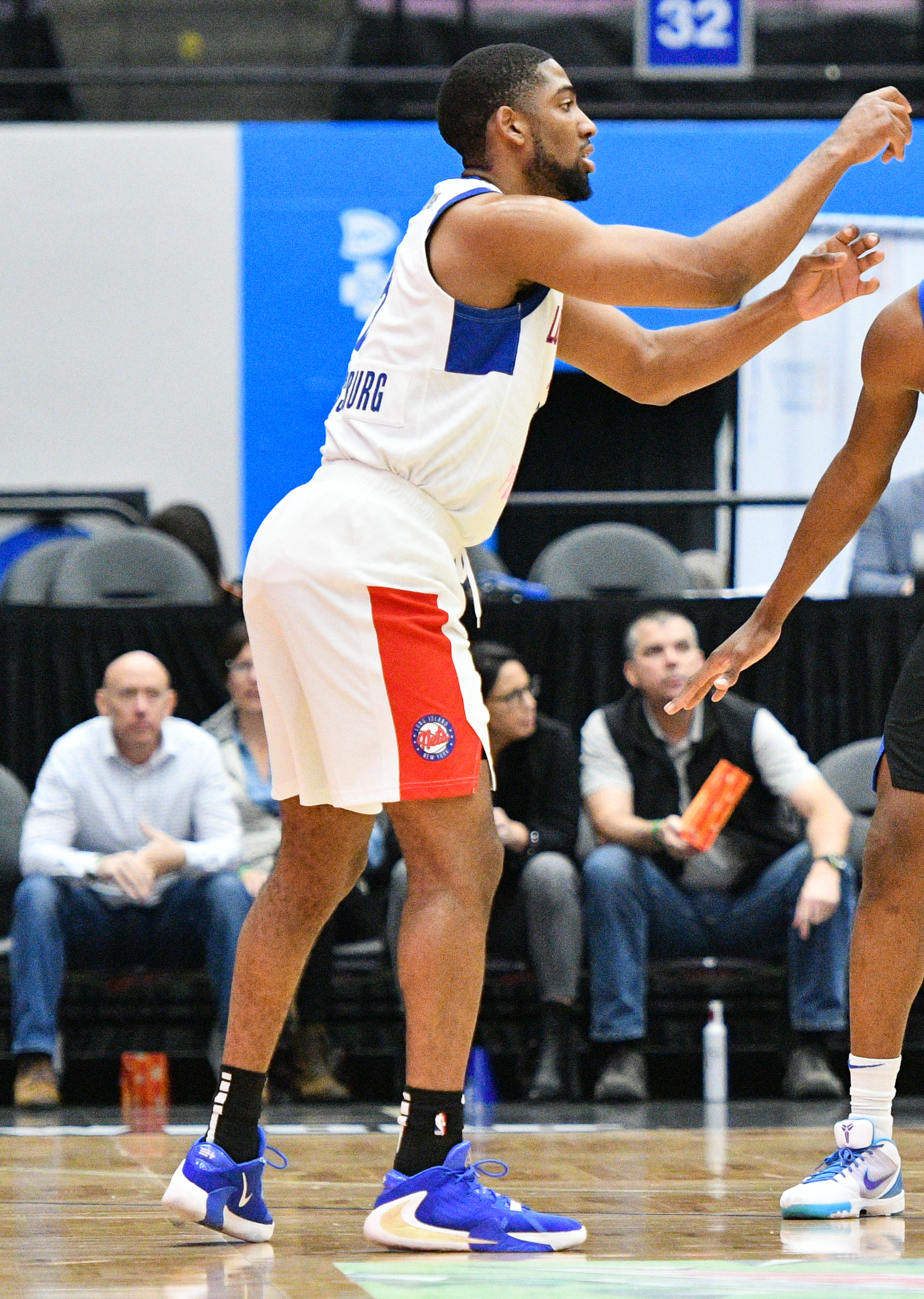
C. J. Massinburg, Buffalo, 2019

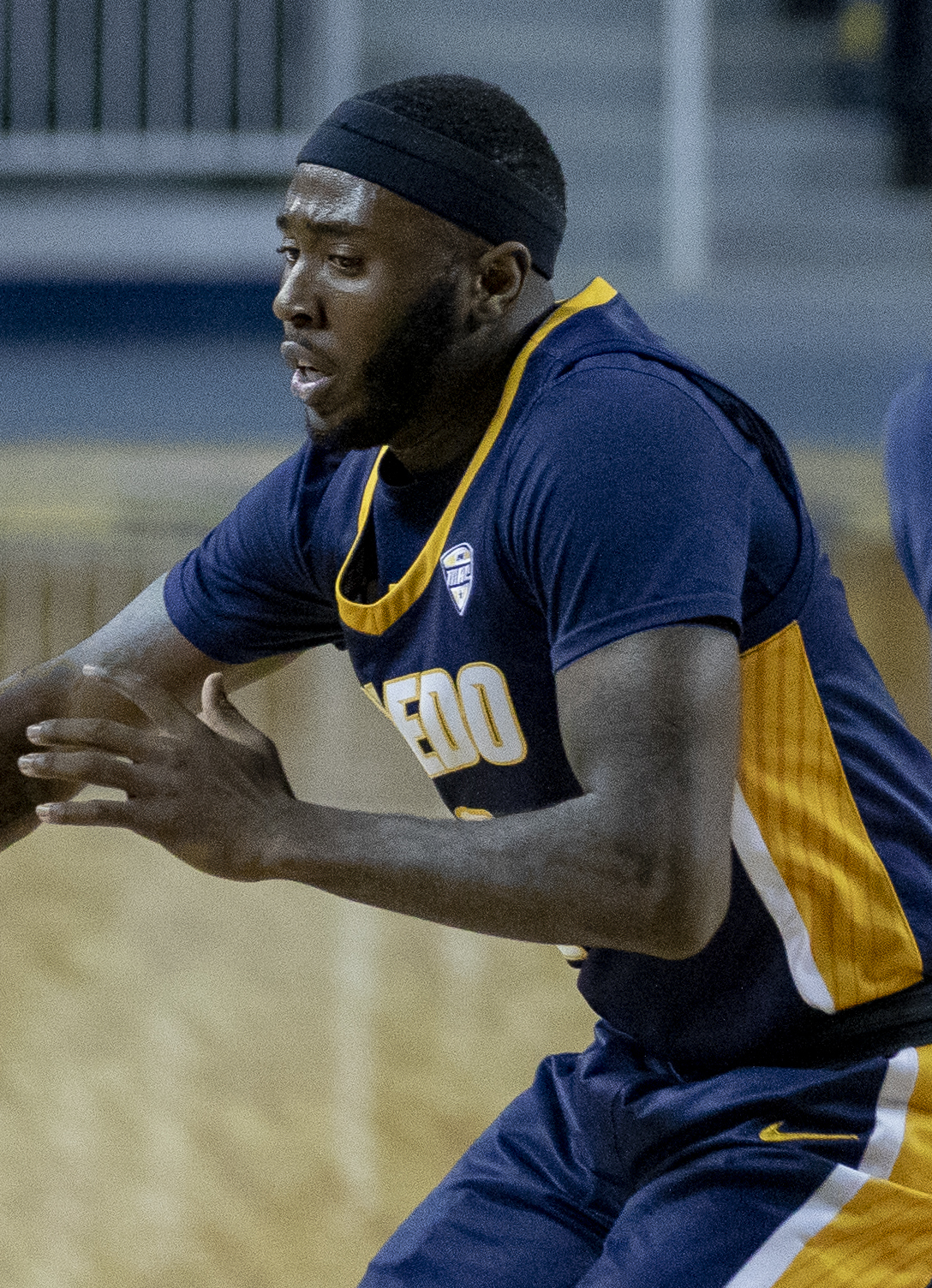
Marreon Jackson, Toledo, 2021

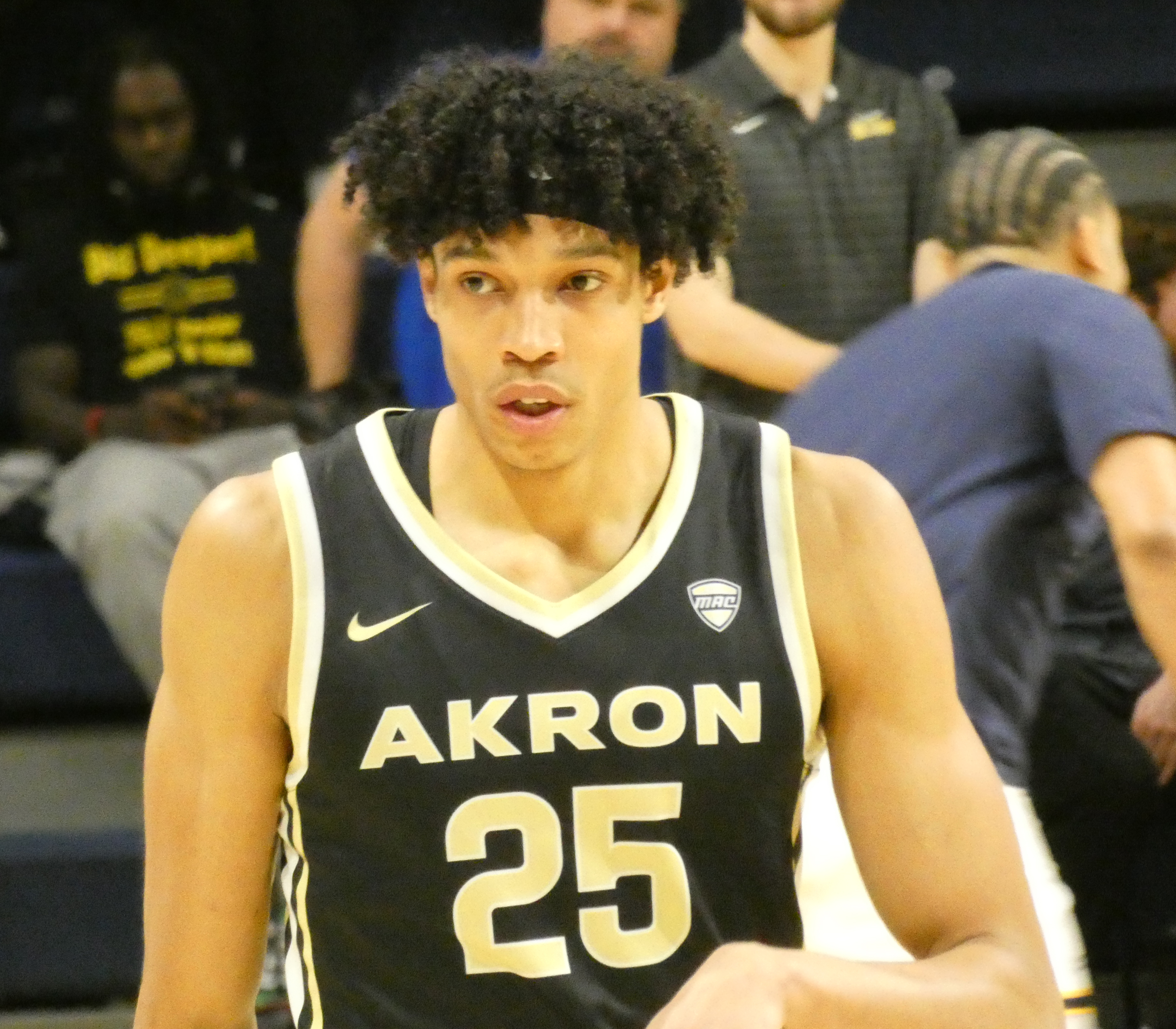
Enrique Freeman, Akron, 2024

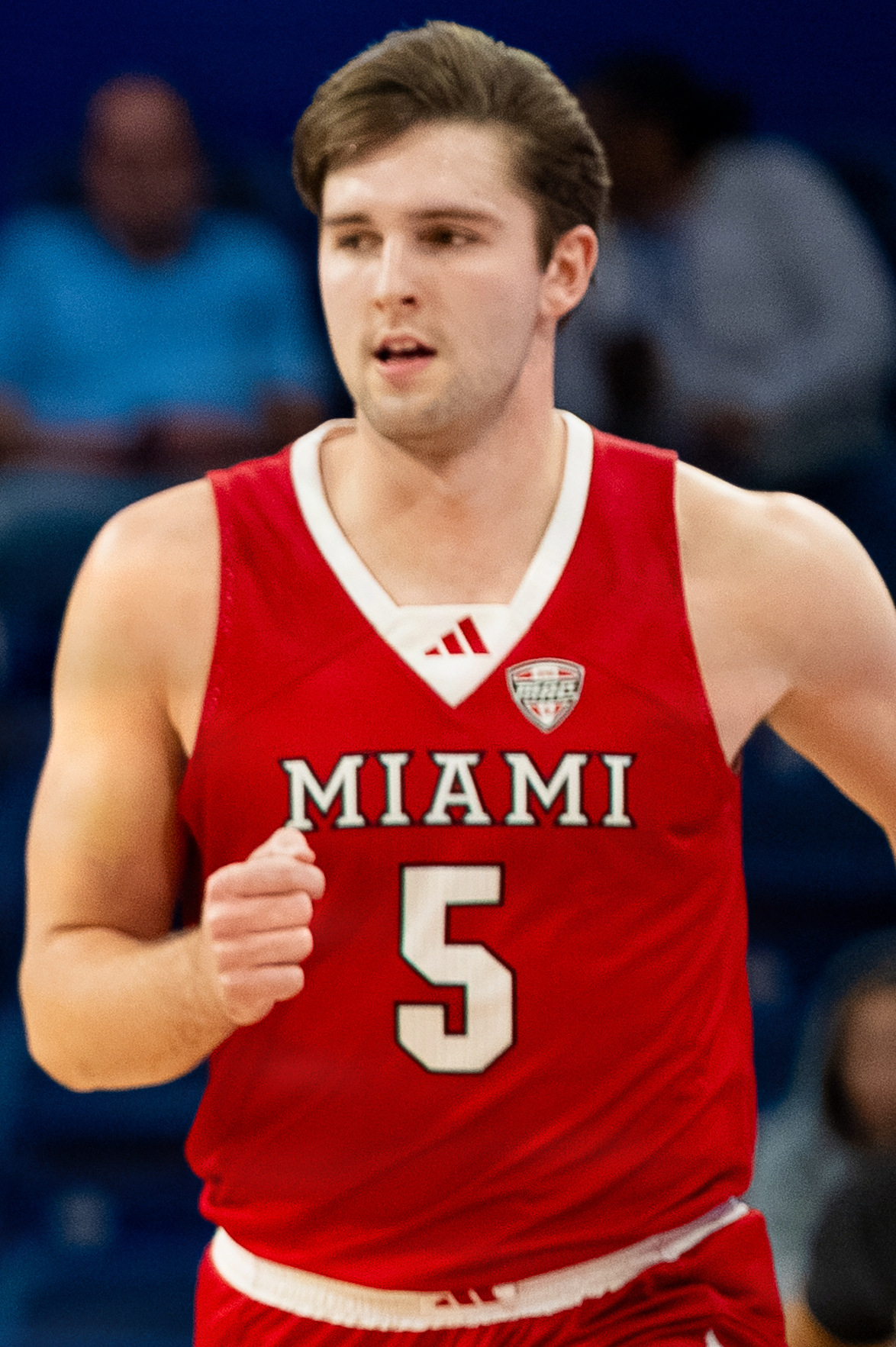
Peter Suder, Miami, 2026

Season	Player	School	Position	Class	Reference
1967–68	Fred Foster	Miami	F	Senior	
1968–69	Steve Mix	Toledo	C	Senior	
1969–70	Jim Penix	Bowling Green	SF	Senior	
1970–71	Ken Kowall	Ohio	G	Senior	
1971–72	Tom Kozelko	Toledo	PF	Junior	
1972–73	Tom Kozelko (2)	Toledo	PF	Senior	
1973–74	Walter Luckett	Ohio	SG	Sophomore	
1974–75	Dan Roundfield	Central Michigan	PF / C	Senior	
1975–76	Jeff Tyson	Western Michigan	SF	Senior	
1976–77	Matt Hicks	Northern Illinois	PF	Senior	
1977–78	Archie Aldridge	Miami	PF	Senior	
1978–79	Paul Dawkins	Northern Illinois	SF	Senior	
1979–80	Jim Swaney	Toledo	F	Senior	
1980–81	Harvey Knuckles	Toledo	SF	Senior	
1981–82	Mel McLaughlin	Central Michigan	SG	Junior	
1982–83	Ray McCallum	Ball State	PG	Senior	
1983–84	John Devereaux	Ohio	C	Senior	
1984–85	Ron Harper	Miami	SG	Junior	
1985–86	Ron Harper (2)	Miami	SG	Senior	
1986–87	Booker James	Western Michigan	SF / SG	Senior	
1987–88	Grant Long	Eastern Michigan	PF	Senior	
1988–89	Paul Graham	Ohio	SF / SG	Senior	
1989–90	Dave Jamerson	Ohio	SG	Senior	
1990–91	Marcus Kennedy	Eastern Michigan	PF	Senior	
1991–92	Lewis Geter	Ohio	SF	Senior	
1992–93	Gary Trent	Ohio	PF	Freshman	
1993–94	Gary Trent (2)	Ohio	PF	Sophomore	
1994–95	Gary Trent (3)	Ohio	PF	Junior	
1995–96	Bonzi Wells	Ball State	SF	Sophomore	
1996–97	Antonio Daniels	Bowling Green	PG	Senior	
1997–98	Bonzi Wells (2)	Ball State	SF	Senior	
1998–99	Wally Szczerbiak	Miami	SF / SG	Senior	
1999–00	Anthony Stacey	Bowling Green	SF	Senior	
2000–01	David Webber	Central Michigan	PG	Junior	
2001–02	Keith McLeod	Bowling Green	SG	Senior	
2002–03	Chris Kaman	Central Michigan	C	Junior	
2003–04	Mike Williams	Western Michigan	SF / PF	Senior	
2004–05	Turner Battle	Buffalo	PG	Senior	
2005–06	DeAndre Haynes	Kent State	PG	Senior	
2006–07	Romeo Travis	Akron	SF	Senior	
2007–08	Al Fisher	Kent State	PG / SG	Junior	
2008–09	Michael Bramos	Miami	SG / SF	Senior	
2009–10	David Kool	Western Michigan	G	Senior	
2010–11	Justin Greene	Kent State	SF	Junior	
2011–12	Mitchell Watt	Buffalo	C	Senior	
2012–13	D. J. Cooper	Ohio	PG	Senior	
2013–14	Javon McCrea	Buffalo	PF	Senior	
2014–15	Justin Moss	Buffalo	PF	Junior	
2015–16	Antonio Campbell	Ohio	F	Junior	
2016–17	Isaiah Johnson	Akron	C	Senior	
2017–18	Tre'Shaun Fletcher	Toledo	SG / SF	Senior	
2018–19	C. J. Massinburg	Buffalo	SG	Senior	
2019–20	Loren Jackson	Akron	PG	Junior	
2020–21	Marreon Jackson	Toledo	PG	Senior	
2021–22	Sincere Carry	Kent State	PG	Junior	
2022–23	RayJ Dennis	Toledo	SG	Senior	
2023–24	Enrique Freeman	Akron	PF	Graduate	
2024–25	Nate Johnson	Akron	PG	Junior	
2025–26	Peter Suder	Miami	SG	Senior	

== Winners by school ==
School (year joined)	Winners	Years
Ohio (1947)	11	1971, 1974, 1984, 1989, 1990, 1992, 1993, 1994, 1995, 2013, 2016
Toledo (1951)	8	1969, 1972, 1973, 1980, 1981, 2018, 2021, 2023
Miami (1948)	7	1968, 1978, 1985, 1986, 1999, 2009, 2026
Akron (1992)	5	2007, 2017, 2020, 2024, 2025
Buffalo (1999)	5	2005, 2012, 2014, 2015, 2019
Bowling Green (1952)	4	1970, 1997, 2000, 2002
Central Michigan (1972)	4	1975, 1982, 2001, 2003
Kent State (1951)	4	2006, 2008, 2011, 2022
Western Michigan (1948)	4	1976, 1987, 2004, 2010
Ball State (1973)	3	1983, 1996, 1998
Eastern Michigan (1972)	2	1988, 1991
Northern Illinois (1973/1997)^{[a]}	2	1977, 1979
Marshall (1954/1997)^{[b]}	0	—
UMass (2025)	0	—

- ^{a} Northern Illinois University was a member from 1973 to 1986, then left for a period. They rejoined in 1997, continuing as a member until leaving in 2026 for the Horizon League (with football joining the Mountain West Conference).}}
- ^{b} Marshall University was a member starting in 1954 before being expelled from the conference in 1969 due to NCAA violations. The Thundering Herd rejoined in 1997, but left in 2005 for Conference USA.
