= Anthony Stacey =

American basketball player & head coach (born 1977)

Bowling Green Falcons
- Title: Assistant coach
- Conference: Mid-American Conference

Personal information
- Born: March 25, 1977 (age 49) Elyria, Ohio, U.S.
- Listed height: 6 ft 4 in (1.93 m)
- Listed weight: 235 lb (107 kg)

Career information
- High school: Midview (Grafton, Ohio)
- College: Bowling Green (1996–2000)
- NBA draft: 2000: undrafted
- Playing career: 2000–2009
- Position: Small forward
- Number: 34, 12
- Coaching career: 2011–present

Career history

Playing
- 2000–2001: Inca Mallorca
- 2001–2002: Minorisa.net Manresa
- 2002–2003: Etosa Murcia
- 2003: Lucentum Alicante
- 2003–2005: Ciudad de Algeciras
- 2005–2006: Inca Mallorca
- 2006–2007: Club Melilla Baloncesto
- 2006–2007: CB Murcia
- 2007–2008: Cantabria Lobos
- 2008–2009: Drac Inca
- 2009–2010: Grupo Begar León

Coaching
- 2011–2014: Medina HS
- 2014–2014: Sandusky HS
- 2014–2014: Toledo (assistant)
- 2015–2020: Bowling Green (assistant)
- 2020–2025: Whitmer HS
- 2025–present: Bowling Green (assistant)

Career highlights
- MAC Player of the Year (2000); 2x First-team All-MAC (1999, 2000); MAC Freshman of the Year (1997)

Anthony Allen Stacey (born March 25, 1977) is an American former basketball player and current assistant coach for the Bowling Green Falcons of the Mid-American Conference (MAC). Prior to that, he was the head coach for Whitmer High School in Toledo. Stacy played college basketball for Bowling Green University, where he was an all-conference college player. He played professionally for several years in Spain's Liga ACB.

Stacey, a 6'4" small forward from Elyria, Ohio, played college basketball at Bowling Green from 1996 to 2000. Stacey averaged 16.0 points and 7.6 rebounds per game as a freshman and was named Mid-American Conference (MAC) Freshman of the Year. Following an injury-shortened sophomore campaign, Stacey was named first team All-MAC his last two seasons, as well as MAC Player of the Year in 2000. Stacey finished his college career with 1,938 points.

Following graduation from Bowling Green, Stacey headed to Spain where he enjoyed a nine-year professional career in Spain, including stints in Liga ACB for CB Lucentum Alicante, CB Murcia and Baloncesto León.

In 2011, Stacey began coaching the Medina High School Varsity boys basketball team. This was his first head coaching job after spending two years as an assistant at Lorain High School. After three seasons in Medina, Stacey stepped down in April 2014 to pursue a full-time job in the Sandusky City School District. During his tenure, Medina went 41-33 including going 19-7 in his final season. He became one of three boys basketball coaches in Medina County history to reach the regional finals.

In 2012, Stacey was named to Bowling Green's Hall of Honor.

In April 2014, he began his coaching job at Sandusky High School. He resigned from this position just two months after accepting the job to take a position with the University of Toledo, where he stayed only six months before resigning for personal reasons.

In 2015, he was named an assistant to the Bowling Green State University men's basketball team, a position he held for five seasons. In 2020 he was named the head coach of Washington Local Schools Whitmer High School, where he had an 80-39 record and made a state final berth.In 2025, he returned to his alma mater as an assistant coach.
