= Bonzi Wells =

American basketball player (born 1976)

- Wells with the Houston Rockets in 2008

Personal information
- Born: September 28, 1976 (age 50) Muncie, Indiana, U.S.
- Listed height: 6 ft 5 in (1.96 m)
- Listed weight: 210 lb (95 kg)

Career information
- High school: Muncie Central (Muncie, Indiana)
- College: Ball State (1994–1998)
- NBA draft: 1998: 1st round, 11th overall pick
- Drafted by: Detroit Pistons
- Playing career: 1998–2010
- Position: Shooting guard / small forward
- Number: 6, 42, 24
- Coaching career: 2021–present

Career history

Playing
- 1998–2003: Portland Trail Blazers
- 2003–2005: Memphis Grizzlies
- 2005–2006: Sacramento Kings
- 2006–2008: Houston Rockets
- 2008: New Orleans Hornets
- 2008–2009: Shanxi Zhongyu
- 2009–2010: Capitanes de Arecibo

Career highlights
- BSN champion (2010); Second-team All-American – USBWA (1998); Third-team All-American – AP (1998); NCAA steals leader (1998); 2× MAC Player of the Year (1996, 1998); 3× First-team All-MAC (1996–1998); No. 42 retired by Ball State Cardinals
- Stats at NBA.com
- Stats at Basketball Reference

Gawen DeAngelo "Bonzi" Wells (born September 28, 1976) is an American basketball player and coach. He was an assistant coach at Georgia Tech and previously was head coach at LeMoyne-Owen. He played college basketball at Ball State University and was drafted in the 1998 NBA draft. In the NBA, Wells played for five teams from 1998 to 2008: the Portland Trail Blazers, Memphis Grizzlies, Sacramento Kings, Houston Rockets, and New Orleans Hornets.

== College career ==
Wells attended Muncie Central High School and then went on to play at Ball State University, also in Muncie. There he was named the Mid-American Conference (MAC) Freshman Player of the Year in the 1995–96 season, while helping the Cardinals to the NCAA Tournament. Wells broke Ron Harper's conference record of 2,377 career points on a one-handed dunk against Northern Illinois on February 21, 1998. The dunk sent the sell-out crowd at University Arena into a frenzy. A timeout was immediately called and Wells was awarded the game ball by Ball State president John Worthen. Wells also led the MAC in steals in 1998 with 73, averaging 3.55 steals in 29 games. Wells led the conference in steals during all four years at Ball State and finished his career as the MAC all-time career records in points (2,485) and steals (347). While at Ball State he averaged 21.4 PPG, 3 SPG, and 7.3 RPG. He was selected eleventh overall by the Detroit Pistons in the 1998 NBA draft, but he never played for the Pistons as his draft rights were traded to the Portland Trail Blazers for the Blazers' 1999 first-round pick. Six years later Ball State would retire his jersey number, 42, in recognition of his achievements.

== Professional career ==
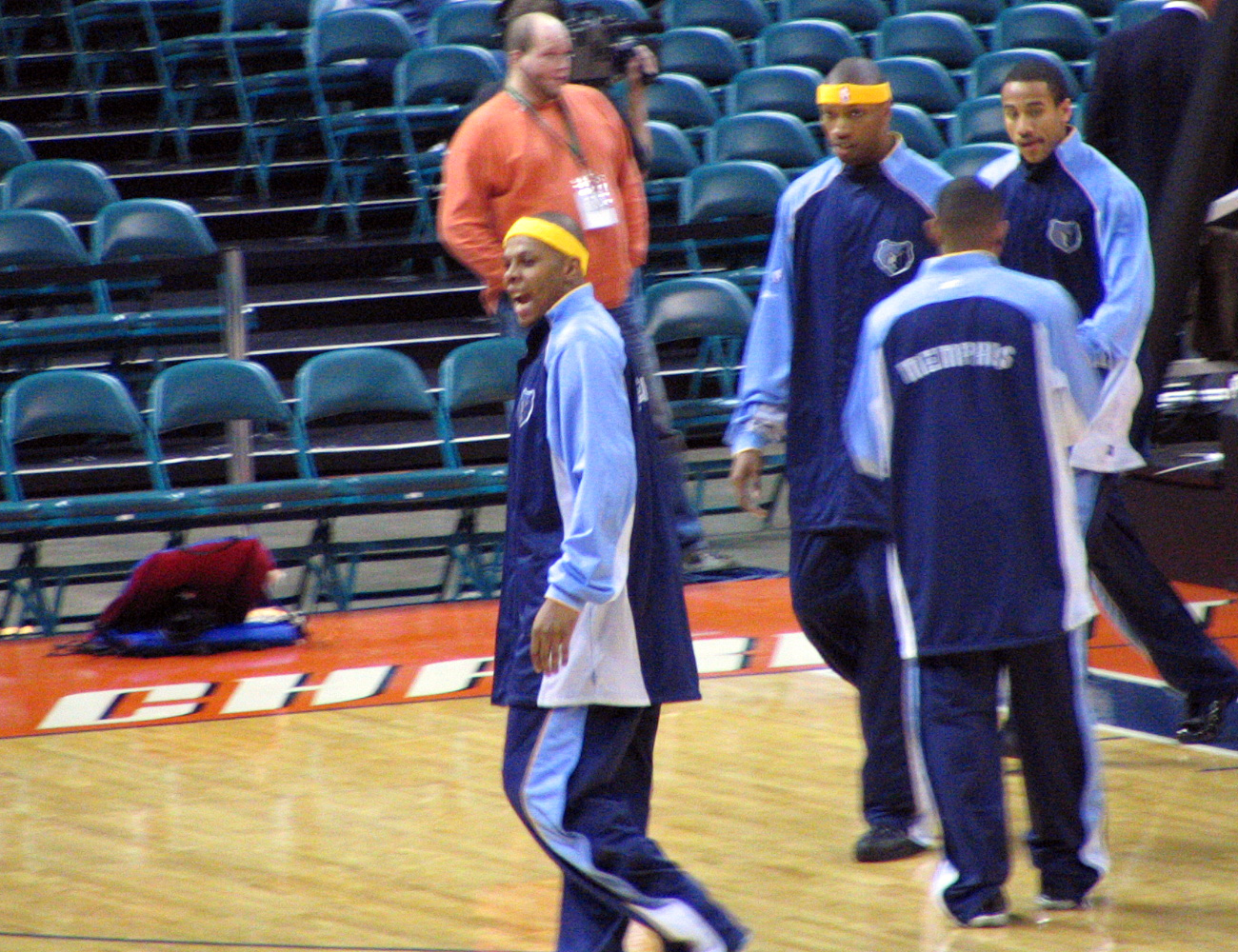
Wells warms up with the Grizzlies before the start of a game versus the Charlotte Bobcats in 2005.

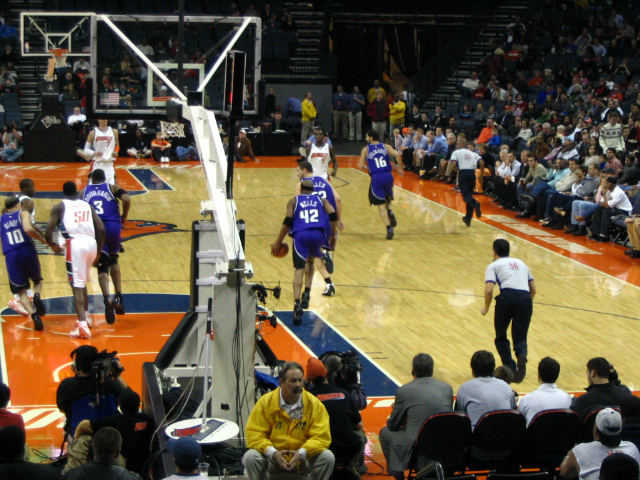
Wells takes the ball up court for the Sacramento Kings.

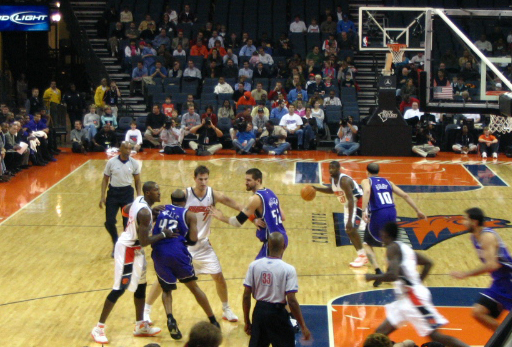
Wells guards Gerald Wallace of the Charlotte Bobcats.

=== Portland Trail Blazers (1998–2003) ===
As a swingman in Portland, Wells achieved career highs in scoring and improved somewhat on defense, and picked up what some would call a bad-boy image, while sharing the role of co-captain with Rasheed Wallace. Wells, however, did have his share of on- and off-court incidents. During his tenure with the Blazers, Wells was suspended for two games for publicly cursing at his coach after being taken out of a game. He was also fined in a separate incident for making an obscene gesture to a fan in a loss to the Philadelphia 76ers. When asked by a media reporter about the incident, he said, "I black out sometimes." Wells was suspended one game without pay and fined $10,000 for intentionally striking and verbally abusing an official in 2000. Wells and teammate Erick Barkley in 2001 were cited for criminal trespass after they refused to follow the order of an officer to leave the scene of a fight near a downtown nightclub. This only went to further the team's derisive nickname, The Jail Blazers.

Wells's legacy in Portland was also positive. On February 24, 2001, Wells recorded a then career high 7 steals in one game, while also scoring 21 points and recording 7 assists. He set the franchise record for most points scored in a playoff game at 45 against the Dallas Mavericks in the first round of the 2003 NBA Playoffs. The co-captains carried the sixth-seeded Trail Blazers to a decisive Game 7 versus the Steve Nash and Dirk Nowitzki-led three-seeded Mavericks. The Mavericks won the series, and thirteen games into the following season Wells was traded to the Memphis Grizzlies for Wesley Person and a 2004 first-round pick. Trail Blazers management made an oath to the City of Portland to have a team of upstanding Portlanders, and drastically restructured the team. In an exchange that emphasized the urgency to release Wells, he was traded to the Memphis Grizzlies for reserve guard Wesley Person.

=== Memphis Grizzlies (2003–2005) ===
The unorthodox coaching methods of Hubie Brown and his strict 10-man rotation limited Wells to just under 25 minutes per game for the Grizzlies. This tactic helped them earn their first playoff appearance in franchise history.

After Brown suddenly quit as coach midway through the 2004–05 season, Mike Fratello took over as head coach. It appeared Wells was finally going to be given a chance to pose a threat on the court. This would not come to be, highlighted by the fact that Wells played a total of 27 minutes in the Grizzlies' second playoff appearance in 2005. Citing undisclosed reasons, Fratello suspended him for Game 2 of the series against the powerhouse Phoenix Suns. He returned in Game 3, only to play nine minutes. Wells did not dress for the series-ending Game 4.

=== Sacramento Kings (2005–2006) ===
Prior to the start of the 2005–06 NBA season, Wells was acquired from the Grizzlies by the Kings in a trade for point guard Bobby Jackson and center Greg Ostertag. He was also forced to change his jersey number from 6 to 42 upon arrival. In Sacramento the number 6 has been retired in honor of the fans, as in they are the "sixth man" of the team. In the early part of the season, Wells had been a rebounding force for the Kings, recording career-best numbers in rebounds, while also recording excellent assists and steals totals.

In the playoffs, Wells was extremely productive, averaging 23.2 points and 12 rebounds per game in 6 games against the San Antonio Spurs, though the Kings lost the series. When Wells entered free agency at the closing of the season, teammate Ron Artest (now known as Metta World Peace) offered to forgo his entire salary in order to keep him on the team.

=== Houston Rockets (2006–2008) ===
The day before the 2006 training camp began, Wells signed with the Houston Rockets, with a salary of "only" $2 million in the initial season. This was considered to be a great bargain for the Rockets, as Wells had turned down a 5-year, $38.5 million offer from the Kings.

Wells missed the beginning of training camp recovering from a groin injury, and then missed several days following dental work. In addition, he was absent on more than one occasion for "personal reasons". Wells played only 30 minutes total, scoring only six points, in the Rockets' second and third games of the season. Wells was not pleased with his playing time, and neither was coach Jeff Van Gundy with Wells' weight and lack of conditioning. Van Gundy placed Wells on the inactive list, dismissed him from team practices for over a month, and relegated him to working with trainers and on the exercise bicycle to improve his conditioning. Unsatisfied with his progress, Van Gundy eventually told him to stay away from the Toyota Center.

In December, Wells and his coach reconciled their differences and Bonzi was allowed back into practice. He returned to action against the Los Angeles Lakers on December 12, and over the next two weeks, his playing time gradually increased. He suffered a back injury in late December that would force him to miss the Rockets' next 10 games. He returned to the lineup on January 17, and saw consistent playing time off the bench, highlighted by his 14 points in a win against his former team, the Trail Blazers.

On April 9, Wells failed to show up for a road trip to face the Seattle SuperSonics. His status was unknown, but it was reported that he left a message on athletic trainer Keith Jones' answering machine. In it, he said he felt like he was "disrupting team chemistry." After coach Jeff Van Gundy was fired and the former Kings coach Rick Adelman was named as the replacement, he expressed his willingness to return. On June 23, it was announced he had opted to stay with the Rockets and exercised the last year of his contract.

=== New Orleans Hornets (2008) ===
On February 21, 2008, Wells was traded to the New Orleans Hornets along with Mike James as part of a three-team deal involving Houston and the Memphis Grizzlies. The agreement sent New Orleans guard Bobby Jackson to Houston, marking the second time Wells and Jackson swapped teams via trade. February 23, Wells made his Hornets debut when he came off the bench registering 2 points, 3 rebounds, 1 assist and 2 steals in a 98–89 loss to the San Antonio Spurs. On March 22, Wells set a career high with 8 steals in one game, during a 113–106 victory over the Boston Celtics.

The Hornets decided not to renew Wells's contract for the 2008–09 NBA season.

=== Shanxi Zhongyu (2008–2009) ===
Wells chose to sign with Shanxi Zhongyu of the Chinese Basketball Association rather than play for the NBA's minimum salary. In his debut with the Shanxi Zhongyu, he scored 48 points and tallied 11 rebounds.

His contract with the team was terminated on February 2, 2009, after he failed to promptly return to the team after the Chinese New Year break.

=== Capitanes de Arecibo (2009–2010) ===
On November 25, 2009, Wells signed a contract with Puerto Rican team Capitanes de Arecibo.

In December 2011, Wells signed with the Minnesota Timberwolves, but he did not make their final roster.

== Personal life ==
Gawen DeAngelo Wells is named after his father Gawen Wells. The nickname, Bonzi, originated from the cravings his mother, Christine Scaife Coleman, had for ice cream bonbons during her pregnancy with him. His parents called him "bonbon" until the age of two, and it eventually evolved into what it is today. He is the father to three sons, Duane, Gawen and Christian.

In 2003, Wells shed tears when his hometown Roy C. Buley Community Center named its gymnasium in his honor. It is now called the Bonzi Wells Gymnasium. As a small child at the community center watching teams get picked for a game from the sidelines "like a cheerleader," his uncle and team captain chose the young Bonzi. "I thought he was kidding," Wells recalls, "but he really picked me. And I played as hard as I can. I can remember that day like it was yesterday and that was the day that really made me want to be one of the best." Wells, who donated money to keep the gymnasium from closing its doors, said he did not expect such a reaction, and that he was "doing it for the children."

Wells left Ball State to enter the NBA before being able to graduate but returned to earn his degree in 2014. He would later tell the Naismith Awards that his favorite memory was not one of basketball, but the smile his parents had on their faces when he graduated.

In 2019, Wells served as a Sports Envoy to China for the U.S. State Department's Sports Diplomacy Office.

== NBA career statistics ==
Legend
GP	Games played	GS	Games started	MPG	Minutes per game
FG%	Field goal percentage	3P%	3-point field goal percentage	FT%	Free throw percentage
RPG	Rebounds per game	APG	Assists per game	SPG	Steals per game
BPG	Blocks per game	PPG	Points per game	**Bold**	Career high

=== Regular season ===
Year	Team	GP	GS	MPG	FG%	3P%	FT%	RPG	APG	SPG	BPG	PPG
1998–99	Portland	7	0	5.0	**.550**	.333	.444	1.3	.4	.1	.1	4.4
1999–00	Portland	66	0	17.6	.492	.377	.682	2.8	1.5	1.0	.2	8.8
2000–01	Portland	**75**	46	26.6	.533	.340	.663	4.9	2.8	1.3	.3	12.7
2001–02	Portland	74	**69**	31.7	.469	**.384**	.741	6.0	2.8	1.5	.3	**17.0**
2002–03	Portland	**75**	65	31.9	.441	.292	.722	5.3	**3.3**	1.6	.2	15.2
2003–04	Portland	13	10	31.1	.389	.125	**.778**	4.7	2.7	1.5	.2	12.2
2003–04	Memphis	59	17	24.9	.437	.344	.750	3.4	1.8	1.2	.3	12.3
2004–05	Memphis	69	19	21.6	.441	.346	.750	3.3	1.2	1.2	.4	10.4
2005–06	Sacramento	52	41	**32.4**	.463	.222	.679	**7.7**	2.8	**1.8**	**.5**	13.6
2006–07	Houston	28	1	21.1	.411	.143	.561	4.3	1.1	.9	**.5**	7.8
2007–08	Houston	51	7	22.0	.425	.211	.638	5.1	1.6	1.0	**.5**	9.2
2007–08	New Orleans	22	0	19.9	.490	.333	.660	3.2	.8	1.1	.4	8.8
Career		591	275	25.6	.460	.327	.697	4.6	2.1	1.3	.3	12.1

=== Playoffs ===
Year	Team	GP	GS	MPG	FG%	3P%	FT%	RPG	APG	SPG	BPG	PPG
2000	Portland	**14**	0	13.4	.446	.200	.707	2.5	.9	.5	.0	7.8
2002	Portland	3	3	35.3	.368	.000	.692	4.0	**4.3**	2.0	.3	12.3
2003	Portland	7	**7**	38.3	.395	.300	.667	6.9	3.7	**2.1**	.4	19.0
2004	Memphis	4	0	23.5	.514	.000	.643	3.0	1.0	1.0	.3	11.8
2005	Memphis	2	0	12.5	.444	.000	**1.000**	2.0	1.5	1.0	**.5**	7.0
2006	Sacramento	6	6	**41.5**	**.609**	**.625**	.651	**12.0**	1.3	.8	.3	**23.2**
2008	New Orleans	12	0	14.2	.386	.000	.000	2.6	.7	.3	.3	3.7
Career		48	16	22.9	.455	.276	.660	4.5	1.6	.9	.2	10.8

== See also ==
- List of NCAA Division I men's basketball season steals leaders
- List of NCAA Division I men's basketball career steals leaders
