= Theron Smith =

American basketball player (born 1980)

Personal information
- Born: October 3, 1980 (age 46) Winter Haven, Florida, U.S.
- Listed height: 6 ft 8 in (2.03 m)
- Listed weight: 260 lb (118 kg)

Career information
- High school: Auburndale (Auburndale, Florida)
- College: Ball State (1999–2003)
- NBA draft: 2003: undrafted
- Playing career: 2003–2014
- Position: Small forward / power forward
- Number: 0

Career history
- 2003–2004: Memphis Grizzlies
- 2004–2005: Charlotte Bobcats
- 2005–2006: Florida Flame
- 2006–2007: Pallacanestro Cantù
- 2007–2008: Orléans Loiret Basket
- 2008–2009: Tianjin Ronggang
- 2010–2011: AB Latina
- 2011: Steaua Bucuresti
- 2011–2012: Obras Sanitarias
- 2013–2014: Bucaneros de La Guaira
- 2014: Obras Sanitarias

Career highlights
- First-team All-MAC (2002)
- Stats at NBA.com
- Stats at Basketball Reference

Theron Augustus Smith (born October 3, 1980) is an American former professional basketball player of the National Basketball Association (NBA) and FIBA.

== Basketball career ==
Born in Winter Haven, Florida, Smith played collegiately for the Ball State Cardinals. Two games into his senior year he tore his ACL and opted to pass on a medical redshirt senior year, instead choosing to enter into the 2003 NBA draft.

Going undrafted, he still signed a two-year contract with the Memphis Grizzlies, appearing in 20 regular season matches during his rookie campaign (two points and rebounds per game).

Smith then played for the Charlotte Bobcats after being selected in the expansion draft, and averaged 2.8 points per game throughout his NBA career, where he totalled 53 games. Right knee problems limiting his NBA career.

In 2005–06, he played with the Denver Nuggets in preseason before going to the NBDL's Florida Flame, and the following season represented Pallacanestro Cantú in Italy. In the following eight seasons, he continued overseas, playing for Entente Orléanaise 45 of France and Tianjin Ronggang of China, averaging 23 points, 10 rebounds and five assists per game. In 46 matches he averaged 45 mins per game. Smith also has experience playing in Romania, Venezuela, and two seasons in Argentina.
