= Ball State Cardinals men's basketball =

College basketball program in Muncie, Indiana, US

| 2026–27 Ball State Cardinals men's basketball team |
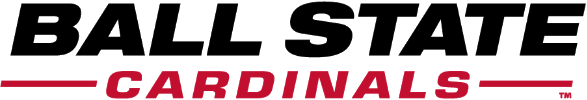
- University: Ball State University
- First season: 1920–21; 106 years ago
- Head coach: Chris Capko (1st season)
- Location: Muncie, Indiana
- Arena: Worthen Arena (capacity: 11,500)
- Conference: Mid-American
- Nickname: Cardinals
- Colors: Cardinal and white
- Student section: The Nest

NCAA Division I tournament Sweet Sixteen
- 1990

NCAA Division I tournament appearances
- 1964*, 1981, 1986, 1989, 1990, 1993, 1995, 2000

NAIA tournament second round
- 1957

Conference tournament champions
- 1981, 1986, 1989, 1990, 1993, 1995, 2000

Conference regular-season champions
- 1981, 1982, 1989, 1990, 1993, 1998, 2000

Conference division champions
- 1998, 2000, 2002, 2009, 2016, 2017, 2020

Uniforms
| Home | Away |
- * at Division II level

Ball State–Indiana State rivalry
- Sport: Men's basketball
- Teams: Ball State Cardinals; Indiana State Sycamores
- First meeting: February 11, 1922; Indiana State 47, Ball State 12
- Latest meeting: November 22, 2025; Indiana State 70, Ball State 52

Statistics
- Total meetings: 131
- All-time series: Indiana State leads, 73–60
- Largest victory: Indiana State, 65–19 (1922–23)
- Longest win streak: Indiana State, 8 (1969–1973); Ball State, 5 (1953–1955)
- Current win streak: Indiana State, 1 (2020–present)

Ball State–Butler rivalry
- Sport: men's basketball
- Teams: Ball State Cardinals; Butler Bulldogs
- First meeting: December 23, 1924; Butler 27, Ball State 13
- Latest meeting: November 23, 2013; Ball State 53, Butler 67

Statistics
- Total meetings: 105
- All-time series: Butler leads, 67–38
- Largest victory: Butler, 67–17 (1921–22)
- Longest win streak: Butler, 13 (1958–1964); Ball State, 7 (1977–1982)
- Current win streak: Butler, 1 (2012–present)

The Ball State Cardinals men's basketball team represents Ball State University in Muncie, Indiana. The Cardinals first basketball season was 1920–21. The school's team currently competes in the Mid-American Conference. The team last played in the NCAA Division I men's basketball tournament in 2000.

The Cardinals have had various levels of success throughout their 94 seasons of competition. Although there was little success in the program from its start until the 1970s, the next two decades would be the highlight of the program's performance. Ball State became a sporadic leader in the Mid-American Conference, winning a record seven MAC tournaments between 1981 and 2000. The Cardinals also accomplished a large feat during the 2001 Maui Invitational Tournament, when they upset #4 Kansas and #3 UCLA on consecutive days. In 2017, the Cardinals beat #8 Notre Dame Fighting Irish at Purcell Pavilion by a score of 80–77, breaking a sixteen-year drought against ranked teams.

== Rivals ==
Ball State's rivals in men's basketball are against other in-state, out-of-conference programs Butler (since 1924), Evansville (since 1929), Indiana State (since 1922), and Valparaiso (since 1927). Prior to moving to the Division I Mid-American Conference in the 1971–72 season, Ball State shared conferences with its rivals, in the Indiana Intercollegiate Conference and later Indiana Collegiate Conference, both Division II.

== Postseason ==
=== NCAA Division I tournament ===
The Cardinals have appeared in seven NCAA Division I Tournaments. All of their tournament appearances have been automatic bids given to the Cardinals as a result of winning the MAC tournament. Their overall NCAA Tournament record is 3–7. Ball State's most successful year was 1990, when they reached the Sweet Sixteen but lost to eventual national champion UNLV, 69–67. It was the closest game UNLV played in that tournament - they won their five other games by an average margin of 23 points, including a 30-point win over Duke in the national championship game.

| Year | Seed | Round | Opponent | Result |
|---|---|---|---|---|
| 1981 | #12 | Round of 48 | #5 Boston College | L 90–93 |
| 1986 | #14 | Round of 64 | #3 Memphis State | L 63–95 |
| 1989 | #9 | Round of 64; Round of 32 | #8 Pittsburgh #1 Illinois | W 68–64; L 60–72 |
| 1990 | #12 | Round of 64; Round of 32; Sweet Sixteen | #5 Oregon State #4 Louisville #1 UNLV | W 54–53; W 62–60; L 67–69 |
| 1993 | #15 | Round of 64 | #2 Kansas | L 72–94 |
| 1995 | #12 | Round of 64 | #5 Arizona State | L 66–81 |
| 2000 | #11 | Round of 64 | #6 UCLA | L 57–65 |

=== National Invitation tournament ===
The Cardinals have appeared in four National Invitation Tournament tournaments. Their overall NIT record is 3–4. Their most successful year in the NIT was 2002, when the Cardinals gained all three of their NIT victories but lost to eventual national runner-up South Carolina.

| Year | Round | Opponent | Result |
|---|---|---|---|
| 1991 | First round | Cincinnati | L 55–83 |
| 1992 | First round | Utah | L 57–72 |
| 1998 | First round | Memphis | L 67–90 |
| 2002 | Opening Round; First round Second Round; Quarterfinals | South Florida; Saint Joseph's; LSU; South Carolina | W 98–92; W 75–65; W 75–65; L 47–82 |

=== CollegeInsider.com tournament ===
The Cardinals have appeared in two CollegeInsider.com Postseason Tournaments (CIT). Their combined record is 2–2.

| Year | Round | Opponent | Result |
|---|---|---|---|
| 2016 | First round Second Round; Quarterfinals | Tennessee State; UT Martin; Columbia | W 78–73^{2OT} W 83–80^{OT} L 67–69 |
| 2017 | First round | Fort Wayne | L 80–88 |

=== NCAA Division II tournament ===
The Cardinals have appeared in the NCAA Division II tournament one time. Their record is 0–2.

| Year | Round | Opponent | Result |
|---|---|---|---|
| 1964 | Regional semifinals Regional 3rd-place game | Southern Illinois; Jackson State | L 81–88; L 71–92 |

=== NAIA tournament ===
The Cardinals have appeared in the NAIA tournament one time. Their record is 1–1.

| Year | Round | Opponent | Result |
|---|---|---|---|
| 1957 | First round Second Round | Troy State; Texas Southern | W 98–70; L 72–97 |

== 1990 Sweet Sixteen team ==
After the departure of head coach Rick Majerus, Ball State responded under new coach Dick Hunsaker by having the best season in the school's history. This group of Cardinals became the first team in the Mid-American Conference history to win two consecutive MAC regular season conference championships as well as back-to-back conference tournament titles. The 1990 Ball State basketball team also became the first team in the MAC to reach the Sweet 16 of the NCAA tournament in its current format. The Cardinals lost in the Sweet 16 to the eventual national champions UNLV Runnin' Rebels, 69–67.

The team was led by many transfer players and two of Coach Hunsaker's key transfers, starting forwards Paris McCurdy and Curtis Kidd, were high school teammates. They both signed to play their college ball at the University of Arkansas-Little Rock. However, because of disciplinary reasons, the two had to find a new school. Former coach Rick Majerus gave them a second chance, and they came through. The two became the key assets to Ball States Sweet 16 run.

The Cardinals finished the regular season at 26–7 before heading to the NCAA tournament. The Cardinals were a 12 seed and began the tournament at the Huntsman Center in Salt Lake City. They upset the Oregon State Beavers in what was star point guard Gary Payton’s last game in college. Ball State then had to play the Louisville Cardinals next. They ended up defeating Louisville late in the game by a final score of 62–60. Meanwhile, in Muncie, fans stormed the village (the center of Ball State's off campus social scene) after the win. Ball State advanced to face the top-seeded UNLV Runnin' Rebels. Ball State shut down one of the best offenses in college basketball history and had a chance to win it in the final seconds: Down by two, the Cardinals made a deep pass to tie or take the lead but it was picked off.

== Players ==
=== Retired numbers ===
The Cardinals have retired two numbers in their history:

| No. | Player | Position | Career | Ref. |
|---|---|---|---|---|
| 10 | Ray McCallum | PG | 1979–1983 | |
| 42 | Bonzi Wells | SF | 1994–1998 | |

=== NBA players ===
Two Cardinals players have gone on to play professionally in the National Basketball Association (NBA):

- Theron Smith
- Bonzi Wells

=== International players ===
- Jarrod Jones (born 1990), American-Hungarian basketball player in the Israeli Basketball Premier League
- Marcus Norris (born 1974), 2003–04 Israeli Basketball Premier League Defensive Player of the Year
- Terrence Watson (born 1987), American-Israeli basketball player for Hapoel Eilat of the Israeli Basketball Premier League
