= 1999–2000 Saint Louis Billikens men's basketball team =

American college basketball season

1999–2000 Saint Louis Billikens men's basketball
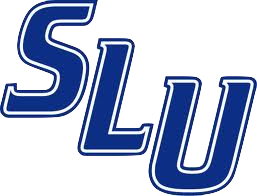

Conference USA tournament champions

NCAA tournament, first round
- Conference: Conference USA
- Record: 19–14 (7–9 C-USA)
- Head coach: Lorenzo Romar (1st season)
- Assistant coaches: Randy Bennett (1st season); Cameron Dollar (1st season); Lance LaVetter (1st season)
- Home arena: Scottrade Center

1999–2000 Conference USA men's basketball standings
| | Conf. | | | | Overall |
| Team | W | | L | PCT | W | | L | PCT |
|---|---|---|---|---|---|---|---|---|
American
| No. 7 Cincinnati | 16 | – | 0 | 1.000 | 29 | – | 4 | .879 |
| Louisville | 10 | – | 6 | .625 | 19 | – | 12 | .613 |
| DePaul | 9 | – | 7 | .563 | 21 | – | 12 | .636 |
| Marquette | 8 | – | 8 | .500 | 15 | – | 14 | .517 |
| Saint Louis † | 7 | – | 9 | .438 | 19 | – | 14 | .576 |
| Charlotte | 7 | – | 9 | .438 | 17 | – | 16 | .515 |
National
| Tulane | 8 | – | 8 | .500 | 20 | – | 11 | .645 |
| South Florida | 8 | – | 8 | .500 | 17 | – | 14 | .548 |
| Southern Miss | 7 | – | 9 | .438 | 17 | – | 12 | .586 |
| UAB | 7 | – | 9 | .438 | 14 | – | 14 | .500 |
| Memphis | 7 | – | 9 | .438 | 15 | – | 16 | .484 |
| Houston | 2 | – | 14 | .125 | 9 | – | 22 | .290 |
† 2000 Conference USA Tournament winner Rankings from AP Poll

The 1999–2000 Saint Louis Billikens men's basketball team represented Saint Louis University in the 1999–2000 NCAA Division I men's basketball season. The Billikens were led by head coach Lorenzo Romar who was in his first season at Saint Louis. The team played their home games at Scottrade Center. They were a member of Conference USA. The Billikens finished the season 19–14, 7–9 in C-USA play to finish 5th in the conference standings. They won the C-USA tournament to receive an automatic bid to the NCAA tournament where they were defeated by Utah in the opening round.

Guard Justin Love (18.2) and forward Justin Tatum (8.3) led the team in scoring.

== Roster ==
1999–2000 Saint Louis Billikens men's basketball team
Players
Coaches

| Pos. | # | Name | Height | Weight | Year | Previous school | Hometown |
|---|---|---|---|---|---|---|---|
| G | 3 | Justin Love | 6 ft 2 in (1.88 m) | 210 lb (95 kg) | Sr | Cañada College | San Francisco, California |
| G | 4 | Dave Fergerson | 6 ft 0 in (1.83 m) | 175 lb (79 kg) | Sr | San Jose City College | Merced, California |
| G | 5 | Marque Perry | 6 ft 1 in (1.85 m) | 175 lb (79 kg) | Fr | Prosser Career Academy | Chicago, Illinois |
| G/F | 10 | Troy Robertson | 6 ft 4 in (1.93 m) | 200 lb (91 kg) | Sr | St. Charles West | St. Louis, Missouri |
| G | 11 | Josh Fisher | 6 ft 2 in (1.88 m) | 185 lb (84 kg) | Fr | Mercer Island | Mercer Island, Washington |
| G | 12 | John Redden | 6 ft 1 in (1.85 m) | 190 lb (86 kg) | Sr | Marquette | St. Louis, Missouri |
| F | 14 | Andrew Latimer | 6 ft 9 in (2.06 m) | 220 lb (100 kg) | Fr | St. Joseph's College | Brisbane, Australia |
| G | 21 | Drew Diener | 6 ft 5 in (1.96 m) | 200 lb (91 kg) | Fr | Goodrich | Fond du Lac, Wisconsin |
| F | 24 | Larry Simmons | 6 ft 7 in (2.01 m) | 215 lb (98 kg) | Sr | Dulles | Missouri City, Texas |
| F | 30 | Matt Baniak | 6 ft 9 in (2.06 m) | 235 lb (107 kg) | Jr | De Smet Jesuit | St. Louis, Missouri |
| G/F | 31 | Maurice Jeffers | 6 ft 4 in (1.93 m) | 195 lb (88 kg) | Jr | Morrilton | Morrilton, Arkansas |
| C | 35 | Chris Heinrich | 6 ft 11 in (2.11 m) | 255 lb (116 kg) | Jr | Church Farm School | Quakertown, Pennsylvania |
| F | 40 | Justin Tatum | 6 ft 7 in (2.01 m) | 235 lb (107 kg) | Jr | CBC HS | St. Louis, Missouri |
| F | 52 | Chris Braun | 6 ft 10 in (2.08 m) | 235 lb (107 kg) | So | Gibault | Waterloo, Illinois |

Head coach

- Lorenzo Romar (Washington)

Assistant coach(es)

- Randy Bennett (UC San Diego)
- Cameron Dollar (UCLA)
- Lance LaVetter (Northern Arizona)

Legend

- (C) Team captain
- (S) Suspended
- (I) Ineligible
- (W) Walk-on
- Injured
- Current redshirt

Roster

== Schedule and results ==
| Date time, TV | Rank^{#} | Opponent^{#} | Result | Record | Site (attendance) city, state |
Regular season
| Nov 13, 1999* | | Air Force; Earth Grains Classic | W 78–70 | 1–0 | Scottrade Center; St. Louis, Missouri |
| Nov 14, 1999* | | Alabama; Earth Grains Classic | W 78–70 | 2–0 | Scottrade Center; St. Louis, Missouri |
| Nov 21, 1999* | | UNC Asheville | W 84–72 | 3–0 | Scottrade Center; St. Louis, Missouri |
| Nov 27, 1999* | | Louisiana Tech | L 60–68 | 3–1 | Scottrade Center; St. Louis, Missouri |
| Dec 1, 1999* | | at Kansas State | L 68–69 | 3–2 | Bramlage Coliseum; Manhattan, Kansas |
| Dec 4, 1999* | | Texas State | W 76–52 | 4–2 | Scottrade Center; St. Louis, Missouri |
| Dec 12, 1999* | | Missouri | W 75–72 | 5–2 | Scottrade Center; St. Louis, Missouri |
| Dec 16, 1999 | | No. 1 Cincinnati | L 64–79 | 5–3 (0–1) | Scottrade Center; St. Louis, Missouri |
| Dec 19, 1999* | | UMKC | W 66–64 | 6–3 | Scottrade Center; St. Louis, Missouri |
| Dec 23, 1999* | | at Dayton | W 83–74 | 7–3 | University of Dayton Arena; Dayton, Ohio |
| Dec 30, 1999* | | vs. No. 10 Kansas; Sprint Shootout | L 60–71 | 7–4 | Kemper Arena; Kansas City, Missouri |
| Jan 2, 2000* | | at Southwest Missouri State | L 62–71 | 7–5 | Hammons Student Center; Springfield, Missouri |
| Jan 5, 2000 | | at Marquette | L 38–56 | 7–6 (0–2) | Bradley Center; Milwaukee, Wisconsin |
| Jan 8, 2000 | | Memphis | W 75–67 | 8–6 (1–2) | Scottrade Center; St. Louis, Missouri |
| Jan 11, 2000* | | Southern Illinois | W 76–64 | 9–6 | Scottrade Center; St. Louis, Missouri |
| Jan 15, 2000 | | at Charlotte | L 51–72 | 9–7 (1–3) | Dale F. Halton Arena; Charlotte, North Carolina |
| Jan 22, 2000 | | at No. 23 DePaul | W 75–69 ^{OT} | 10–7 (2–3) | Allstate Arena; Rosemont, Illinois |
| Jan 26, 2000 | | Marquette | W 67–52 | 11–7 (3–3) | Scottrade Center; St. Louis, Missouri |
| Jan 29, 2000 | | Louisville | W 52–48 | 12–7 (4–3) | Scottrade Center; St. Louis, Missouri |
| Feb 5, 2000 | | at South Florida | L 55–58 | 12–8 (4–4) | Sun Dome; Tampa, Florida |
| Feb 9, 2000 | | UAB | W 78–61 | 13–8 (5–4) | Scottrade Center; St. Louis, Missouri |
| Feb 12, 2000 | | Houston | W 82–70 | 14–8 (6–4) | Scottrade Center; St. Louis, Missouri |
| Feb 16, 2000 | | at Southern Miss | L 48–71 | 14–9 (6–5) | Reed Green Coliseum; Hattiesburg, Mississippi |
| Feb 19, 2000 | | at Tulane | L 58–62 | 14–10 (6–6) | Avron B. Fogelman Arena; New Orleans, Louisiana |
| Feb 23, 2000 | | at Louisville | L 56–68 | 14–11 (6–6) | Freedom Hall; Louisville, Kentucky |
| Feb 26, 2000 | | DePaul | L 54–55 | 14–12 (6–8) | Scottrade Center; St. Louis, Missouri |
| Mar 1, 2000 | | Charlotte | W 72–63 | 15–12 (7–8) | Scottrade Center; St. Louis, Missouri |
| Mar 4, 2000 | | at No. 2 Cincinnati | L 41–84 | 15–13 (7–9) | Myrl Shoemaker Center; Cincinnati, Ohio |
C-USA tournament
| Mar 8, 2000* | (9) | vs. (8) Southern Miss; First Round | W 59–51 | 16–13 | The Pyramid; Memphis, Tennessee |
| Mar 9, 2000* | (9) | vs. (1) No. 1 Cincinnati; Quarterfinals | W 68–58 | 17–13 | The Pyramid; Memphis, Tennessee |
| Mar 10, 2000* | (9) | vs. (4) Tulane; Semifinals | W 64–46 | 18–13 | The Pyramid; Memphis, Tennessee |
| Mar 11, 2000* | (9) | vs. (3) DePaul; Championship Game | W 56–49 | 19–13 | The Pyramid; Memphis, Tennessee |
NCAA tournament
| Mar 16, 2000* | (9 MW) | vs. (8 MW) Utah; First Round | L 45–48 | 19–14 | CSU Convocation Center; Cleveland, Ohio |
*Non-conference game. ^{#}Rankings from AP Poll. (#) Tournament seedings in parentheses. All times are in Central Time. (#) during NCAA Tournament is seed with Region MW=Midwest.
