= 1999–2000 NCAA Division I men's basketball season =

Basketball season

1999–00 NCAA Division I men's basketball season
- Preseason AP No. 1: Connecticut Huskies
- Regular season: November 1999 – March 2000
- NCAA Tournament: 2000
- Tournament dates: March 16 – April 3, 2000
- National Championship: RCA Dome; Indianapolis, Indiana
- NCAA Champions: Michigan State Spartans
- Other champions: Wake Forest Demon Deacons (NIT)
- Player of the Year (Naismith, Wooden): Kenyon Martin, Cincinnati Bearcats

The 1999–2000 NCAA Division I men's basketball season began on November 11, 1999, with the Coaches vs. Cancer Classic, progressed through the regular season and conference tournaments, and concluded with the 2000 NCAA Division I men's basketball tournament championship game on April 3, 2000, at the RCA Dome in Indianapolis, Indiana.

== Season headlines ==
- The Mountain West Conference began play, with eight original members.
- The preseason AP All-American team was named on November 10. Chris Porter of Auburn was the leading vote-getter (53 of 65 votes). The rest of the team included Quentin Richardson of DePaul (46 votes), Mateen Cleaves of Michigan State (44), Scoonie Penn of Ohio State (44) and Terence Morris of Maryland (30).
- David Webber scored 51 points for Central Michigan on February 24, 2000, against Ball State. The total was the highest single-game point total of the season in regulation (second only to Eddie House, who had 61 points in a double-overtime game to tie Kareem Abdul-Jabbar's Pacific-10 Conference record). The tally broke Larry Bird's 1977 McGuirk Arena single-game record performance of 45 points.
- Cincinnati was 28–2 and had been arguably the best team in the country when Player of the Year Kenyon Martin had a season-ending leg fracture three minutes into their first-round Conference USA tournament game against Saint Louis. The Bearcats lost that game and gave the NCAA Tournament selection committee a difficult decision to make about seeding. Ultimately, the Bearcats were made a No. 2 seed in the 2000 NCAA Division I men's basketball tournament and lost in the second round to Tulsa.
- Head coach Tom Izzo led Michigan State to its second national championship behind the play of the "Flintstones," a trio of players from Flint, Michigan. Mateen Cleaves, Morris Peterson and Charlie Bell led the Spartans to an 89–76 win over Florida, with Cleaves named Final Four Most Outstanding Player and Peterson also making the All-Tournament team.

== Rules changes ==
- On uniforms, the use of the single-digit numbers "1" and "2" as player numbers was once again permitted. Their use had been prohibited since the 1957–58 season.

== Season outlook ==
=== Pre-season polls ===
The top 25 from the AP Poll November 9, 1999 and the ESPN/USA Today Poll November 4, 1999.

Associated Press
| Ranking | Team |
|---|---|
| 1 | Connecticut (21) |
| 2 | Cincinnati (19) |
| 3 | Michigan State (20) |
| 4 | Auburn (4) |
| 5 | Ohio State (3) |
| 6 | North Carolina (3) |
| 7 | Temple (2) |
| 8 | Florida |
| 9 | Arizona |
| 10 | Duke |
| 11 | Kansas |
| 12 | UCLA |
| 13 | Stanford |
| 14 | Kentucky |
| 15 | Utah |
| 16 | Illinois |
| 17 | Syracuse |
| 18 | St. John's |
| 19 | Tennessee |
| 20 | DePaul |
| 21 | Texas |
| 22 | Oklahoma State |
| 23 | Purdue |
| 24 | Gonzaga |
| 25 | Miami (FL) |

ESPN/USA Today Coaches
| Ranking | Team |
|---|---|
| 1 | Connecticut (9) |
| 2 | Michigan State (8) |
| 3 | Cincinnati (8) |
| 4 | Auburn |
| 5 | North Carolina (2) |
| 6 | Ohio State (2) |
| 7 | Temple |
| 8 | Florida |
| 9 | Arizona |
| 10 | Duke |
| 11 | Kansas |
| 12 | Kentucky |
| 13 | Stanford |
| 14 | UCLA |
| 15 | Utah |
| 16 | Tennessee |
| 17 | Syracuse |
| 18 | Illinois |
| 19 | St. John's |
| 20 | DePaul |
| 21 | Purdue |
| 22 | Texas |
| 23 | Maryland |
| 24 | Miami (FL) |
| 25 | Oklahoma State |

== Conference membership changes ==
These schools joined new conferences for the 1999–2000 season.

| School | Former conference | New conference |
|---|---|---|
| Air Force Falcons | Western Athletic Conference | Mountain West Conference |
| Albany Great Danes | NECC (D-II) | NCAA Division I independent |
| Belmont Bruins | NCAA Division II independent | NCAA Division I independent |
| BYU Cougars | Western Athletic Conference | Mountain West Conference |
| Centenary Gentlemen | Trans America Athletic Conference | NCAA Division I independent |
| Colorado State Rams | Western Athletic Conference | Mountain West Conference |
| Denver Pioneers | NCAA Division I independent | Sun Belt Conference |
| Elon Phoenix | NCAA Division II independent | Big South Conference |
| High Point Panthers | NCAA Division II independent | Big South Conference |
| Nevada Las Vegas (UNLV) Runnin' Rebels | Western Athletic Conference | Mountain West Conference |
| New Mexico Lobos | Western Athletic Conference | Mountain West Conference |
| Sacred Heart Pioneers | NECC (D-II) | Northeast Conference |
| San Diego State Aztecs | Western Athletic Conference | Mountain West Conference |
| Stony Brook Seawolves | NECC (D-II) | NCAA Division I independent |
| Utah Utes | Western Athletic Conference | Mountain West Conference |
| Wyoming Cowboys | Western Athletic Conference | Mountain West Conference |

== Regular season ==
=== Conferences ===
==== Conference winners and tournaments ====
Twenty-nine conferences concluded their seasons with a single-elimination tournament, with only the Ivy League and the Pacific-10 Conference choosing not to conduct conference tournaments. Conference tournament winners generally received an automatic bid to the 2000 NCAA Division I men's basketball tournament. The Mountain West Conference (MWC) began operation in 1999-2000 and its tournament winner did not receive an automatic bid, although UNLV, the winner of the inaugural MWC tournament, did receive an at-large bid.

| Conference | Regular season winner | Conference player of the year | Conference tournament | Tournament venue (City) | Tournament winner |
|---|---|---|---|---|---|
| America East Conference | Hofstra | Craig "Speedy" Claxton, Hofstra | 2000 America East men's basketball tournament | Bob Carpenter Center (Newark, Delaware) (Except Finals) | Hofstra |
| Atlantic 10 Conference | Temple (East); Dayton (West) | Pepe Sanchez, Temple | 2000 Atlantic 10 men's basketball tournament | The Spectrum (Philadelphia, Pennsylvania) | Temple |
| Atlantic Coast Conference | Duke | Chris Carrawell, Duke | 2000 ACC men's basketball tournament | Charlotte Coliseum (Charlotte, North Carolina) | Duke |
| Big 12 Conference | Iowa State | Marcus Fizer, Iowa State | 2000 Big 12 men's basketball tournament | Kemper Arena (Kansas City, Missouri) | Iowa State |
| Big East Conference | Syracuse & Miami | Troy Murphy, Notre Dame | 2000 Big East men's basketball tournament | Madison Square Garden (New York City, New York) | St. John's |
| Big Sky Conference | Montana & Eastern Washington | Harold Arceneaux, Weber State | 2000 Big Sky men's basketball tournament | Dahlberg Arena (Missoula, Montana) | Northern Arizona |
| Big South Conference | Radford | Jason Williams, Radford | 2000 Big South Conference men's basketball tournament | Asheville Civic Center (Asheville, North Carolina) | Winthrop |
| Big Ten Conference | Michigan State & Ohio State | Morris Peterson, Michigan State (Coaches); A. J. Guyton, Indiana (Media) | 2000 Big Ten Conference men's basketball tournament | United Center (Chicago, Illinois) | Michigan State |
| Big West Conference | Utah State (Eastern); Long Beach State (Western) | Mate Milisa, Long Beach State | 2000 Big West Conference men's basketball tournament | Lawlor Events Center (Reno, Nevada) | Utah State |
| Colonial Athletic Association | James Madison & George Mason | George Evans, George Mason | 2000 CAA men's basketball tournament | Richmond Coliseum (Richmond, Virginia) | UNC-Wilmington |
| Conference USA | Cincinnati (American); Tulane & South Florida (National) | Kenyon Martin, Cincinnati | 2000 Conference USA men's basketball tournament | FedExForum (Memphis, Tennessee) | Saint Louis |
| Ivy League | Penn | Michael Jordan, Penn | No Tournament | | |
| Metro Atlantic Athletic Conference | Siena | Tariq Kirksay, Iona | 2000 MAAC men's basketball tournament | Pepsi Arena (Albany, New York) | Iona |
| Mid-American Conference | Bowling Green (East); Ball State & Toledo (West) | Anthony Stacey, Bowling Green | 2000 MAC men's basketball tournament | Gund Arena (Cleveland, Ohio) | Ball State |
| Mid-Continent Conference | Oakland | Michael Jackson, UMKC | 2000 Mid-Continent Conference men's basketball tournament | Memorial Coliseum (Fort Wayne, Indiana) | Oakland |
| Mid-Eastern Athletic Conference | South Carolina State | Damian Woolfolk, Norfolk State | 2000 Mid-Eastern Athletic Conference men's basketball tournament | Richmond Coliseum (Richmond, Virginia) | South Carolina State |
| Midwestern Collegiate Conference | Butler | Rashad Phillips, Detroit | 2000 Midwestern Collegiate Conference men's basketball tournament | UIC Pavilion (Chicago, Illinois) | Butler |
| Missouri Valley Conference | Indiana State | Nate Green, Indiana State | 2000 Missouri Valley Conference men's basketball tournament | Savvis Center (St. Louis, Missouri) | Creighton |
| Mountain West Conference | UNLV & Utah | Alex Jensen, Utah | 2000 MWC men's basketball tournament | Earl Wilson Stadium (Las Vegas, Nevada) | UNLV |
| Northeast Conference | Central Connecticut State | Rick Mickens, Central Connecticut State | 2000 Northeast Conference men's basketball tournament | Sovereign Bank Arena (Trenton, New Jersey) | Central Connecticut State |
| Ohio Valley Conference | Southeast Missouri State & Murray State | Aubrey Reese, Murray State | 2000 Ohio Valley Conference men's basketball tournament | Gaylord Entertainment Center (Nashville, Tennessee) (Semifinals and Finals) | Southeast Missouri State |
| Pacific-10 Conference | Arizona & Stanford | Eddie House, Arizona State | No Tournament | | |
| Patriot League | Lafayette & Navy | Brian Ehlers, Lafayette | 2000 Patriot League men's basketball tournament | Kirby Sports Center (Easton, Pennsylvania) | Lafayette |
| Southeastern Conference | Tennessee, Florida & Kentucky (East); LSU (West) | Dan Langhi, Vanderbilt (Coaches); Stromile Swift, LSU & Dan Langhi, Vanderbilt (AP) | 2000 SEC men's basketball tournament | Georgia Dome (Atlanta, Georgia) | Arkansas |
| Southern Conference | Appalachian State (North); College of Charleston (South) | Tyson Patterson, Appalachian State | 2000 Southern Conference men's basketball tournament | BI-LO Center (Greenville, South Carolina) | Appalachian State |
| Southland Conference | Sam Houston State | Mike Smith, Louisiana-Monroe | 2000 Southland Conference men's basketball tournament | Hirsch Memorial Coliseum (Shreveport, Louisiana) (Semifinals & Finals) | Lamar |
| Southwestern Athletic Conference | Alcorn State | Adarrial Smylie, Southern | 2000 Southwestern Athletic Conference men's basketball tournament | Mississippi Coast Coliseum (Biloxi, Mississippi) | Jackson State |
| Sun Belt Conference | Louisiana-Lafayette & South Alabama | Gerrod Henderson, Louisiana Tech | 2000 Sun Belt Conference men's basketball tournament | Alltel Arena (North Little Rock, Arkansas) | Louisiana-Lafayette |
| Trans America Athletic Conference | Georgia State & Troy State | Detric Golden, Troy State | 2000 TAAC men's basketball tournament | Memorial Coliseum (Jacksonville, Florida) | Samford |
| West Coast Conference | Pepperdine | Kenyon Jones, San Francisco | 2000 West Coast Conference men's basketball tournament | Toso Pavilion (Santa Clara, California) | Gonzaga |
| Western Athletic Conference | Tulsa | Courtney Alexander, Fresno State | 2000 WAC men's basketball tournament | Selland Arena (Fresno, California) | Fresno State |

==== Conference standings ====
1999–2000 America East Conference men's basketball standings
| | Conf. | | | | Overall |
| Team | W | | L | PCT | W | | L | PCT |
|---|---|---|---|---|---|---|---|---|
| Hofstra † | 16 | – | 2 | .889 | 24 | – | 7 | .774 |
| Maine | 15 | – | 3 | .833 | 24 | – | 7 | .774 |
| Delaware | 14 | – | 4 | .778 | 24 | – | 8 | .750 |
| Vermont | 11 | – | 7 | .611 | 16 | – | 12 | .571 |
| Drexel | 9 | – | 9 | .500 | 13 | – | 17 | .433 |
| Towson | 7 | – | 11 | .389 | 11 | – | 17 | .393 |
| Hartford | 6 | – | 12 | .333 | 10 | – | 19 | .345 |
| Boston University | 5 | – | 13 | .278 | 7 | – | 22 | .241 |
| Northeastern | 5 | – | 13 | .278 | 7 | – | 21 | .250 |
| New Hampshire | 2 | – | 16 | .111 | 3 | – | 25 | .107 |
† 2000 America East tournament winner Rankings from AP poll

1999–2000 ACC men's basketball standings
| | Conf. | | | | Overall |
| Team | W | | L | PCT | W | | L | PCT |
|---|---|---|---|---|---|---|---|---|
| No. 1 Duke † | 15 | – | 1 | .938 | 29 | – | 5 | .853 |
| No. 17 Maryland | 11 | – | 5 | .688 | 25 | – | 10 | .714 |
| Virginia | 9 | – | 7 | .563 | 19 | – | 12 | .613 |
| North Carolina | 9 | – | 7 | .563 | 22 | – | 14 | .611 |
| Wake Forest | 7 | – | 9 | .438 | 22 | – | 14 | .611 |
| NC State | 6 | – | 10 | .375 | 20 | – | 14 | .588 |
| Florida State | 5 | – | 11 | .313 | 13 | – | 17 | .433 |
| Georgia Tech | 5 | – | 11 | .313 | 13 | – | 17 | .433 |
| Clemson | 4 | – | 12 | .250 | 10 | – | 20 | .333 |
† 2000 ACC tournament winner Rankings from AP Poll

1999–2000 Atlantic 10 men's basketball standings
| | Conf. | | | | Overall |
| Team | W | | L | PCT | W | | L | PCT |
|---|---|---|---|---|---|---|---|---|
East
| No. 5 Temple † | 14 | – | 2 | .875 | 27 | – | 6 | .818 |
| St. Bonaventure | 11 | – | 5 | .688 | 21 | – | 10 | .677 |
| UMass | 9 | – | 7 | .563 | 17 | – | 16 | .515 |
| Fordham | 7 | – | 9 | .438 | 14 | – | 15 | .483 |
| Saint Joseph's | 7 | – | 9 | .438 | 13 | – | 16 | .448 |
| Rhode Island | 2 | – | 14 | .125 | 5 | – | 25 | .167 |
West
| Dayton | 11 | – | 5 | .688 | 22 | – | 9 | .710 |
| Xavier | 9 | – | 7 | .563 | 21 | – | 12 | .636 |
| George Washington | 9 | – | 7 | .563 | 15 | – | 15 | .500 |
| Virginia Tech | 8 | – | 8 | .500 | 16 | – | 15 | .516 |
| La Salle | 5 | – | 11 | .313 | 11 | – | 17 | .393 |
| Duquesne | 4 | – | 12 | .250 | 9 | – | 20 | .310 |
† 2000 Atlantic 10 Tournament winner Rankings from AP Poll

1999–2000 Big 12 men's basketball standings
| | Conf. | | | | Overall |
| Team | W | | L | PCT | W | | L | PCT |
|---|---|---|---|---|---|---|---|---|
| No. 6 Iowa State † | 14 | – | 2 | .875 | 32 | – | 5 | .865 |
| No. 15 Texas | 13 | – | 3 | .813 | 24 | – | 9 | .727 |
| No. 12 Oklahoma | 12 | – | 4 | .750 | 27 | – | 7 | .794 |
| No. 14 Oklahoma State | 12 | – | 4 | .750 | 27 | – | 7 | .794 |
| Kansas | 11 | – | 5 | .688 | 24 | – | 10 | .706 |
| Missouri | 10 | – | 6 | .625 | 18 | – | 13 | .581 |
| Colorado | 7 | – | 9 | .438 | 18 | – | 14 | .563 |
| Nebraska | 4 | – | 12 | .250 | 11 | – | 19 | .367 |
| Baylor | 4 | – | 12 | .250 | 14 | – | 15 | .483 |
| Texas A&M | 4 | – | 12 | .250 | 8 | – | 20 | .286 |
| Texas Tech | 3 | – | 13 | .188 | 12 | – | 16 | .429 |
| Kansas State | 2 | – | 14 | .125 | 9 | – | 19 | .321 |
† 2000 Big 12 Tournament winner Rankings from AP poll

1999–2000 Big East men's basketball standings
| | Conf. | | | | Overall |
| Team | W | | L | PCT | W | | L | PCT |
|---|---|---|---|---|---|---|---|---|
| No. 16 Syracuse | 13 | – | 3 | .813 | 26 | – | 6 | .813 |
| No. 23 Miami (FL) | 13 | – | 3 | .813 | 23 | – | 11 | .676 |
| No. 9 St. John's† | 12 | – | 4 | .750 | 25 | – | 8 | .758 |
| No. 20 Connecticut | 10 | – | 6 | .625 | 25 | – | 10 | .714 |
| Seton Hall | 10 | – | 6 | .625 | 22 | – | 10 | .688 |
| Villanova | 8 | – | 8 | .500 | 20 | – | 13 | .606 |
| Notre Dame | 8 | – | 8 | .500 | 22 | – | 15 | .595 |
| West Virginia | 6 | – | 10 | .375 | 14 | – | 14 | .500 |
| Georgetown | 6 | – | 10 | .375 | 19 | – | 15 | .559 |
| Rutgers | 6 | – | 10 | .375 | 15 | – | 16 | .484 |
| Pittsburgh | 5 | – | 11 | .313 | 13 | – | 15 | .464 |
| Providence | 4 | – | 12 | .250 | 11 | – | 19 | .367 |
| Boston College | 3 | – | 13 | .188 | 11 | – | 19 | .367 |
† 2000 Big East tournament winner As of April 3, 2000; Rankings from AP poll

1999–2000 Big Sky men's basketball standings
| | Conf. | | | | Overall |
| Team | W | | L | PCT | W | | L | PCT |
|---|---|---|---|---|---|---|---|---|
| Montana | 12 | – | 4 | .750 | 17 | – | 11 | .607 |
| Eastern Washington | 12 | – | 4 | .750 | 15 | – | 12 | .556 |
| Northern Arizona † | 11 | – | 5 | .688 | 20 | – | 11 | .645 |
| Cal State Northridge | 10 | – | 6 | .625 | 20 | – | 10 | .667 |
| Weber State | 10 | – | 6 | .625 | 18 | – | 10 | .643 |
| Portland State | 7 | – | 9 | .438 | 15 | – | 14 | .517 |
| Montana State | 4 | – | 12 | .250 | 12 | – | 17 | .414 |
| Sacramento State | 3 | – | 13 | .188 | 9 | – | 18 | .333 |
| Idaho State | 3 | – | 13 | .188 | 8 | – | 19 | .296 |
† Conference tournament winner Rankings from AP poll

1999–2000 Big South Conference men's basketball standings
| | Conf. | | | | Overall |
| Team | W | | L | PCT | W | | L | PCT |
|---|---|---|---|---|---|---|---|---|
| Radford | 12 | – | 2 | .857 | 18 | – | 10 | .643 |
| Winthrop † | 11 | – | 3 | .786 | 21 | – | 9 | .700 |
| Coastal Carolina | 7 | – | 7 | .500 | 10 | – | 18 | .357 |
| UNC Asheville | 7 | – | 7 | .500 | 11 | – | 18 | .379 |
| Elon* | 7 | – | 7 | .500 | 13 | – | 15 | .464 |
| High Point* | 5 | – | 9 | .357 | 11 | – | 17 | .393 |
| Liberty | 4 | – | 10 | .286 | 14 | – | 14 | .500 |
| Charleston Southern | 3 | – | 11 | .214 | 8 | – | 21 | .276 |
† 2000 Big South tournament winner Rankings from AP Poll; *Ineligible for conference tournament

1999–2000 Big Ten Conference men's basketball standings
| | Conf. | | | | Overall |
| Team | W | | L | PCT | W | | L | PCT |
|---|---|---|---|---|---|---|---|---|
| No. 2 Michigan State† | 13 | – | 3 | .813 | 32 | – | 7 | .821 |
| No. 25 Purdue | 12 | – | 4 | .750 | 24 | – | 10 | .706 |
| No. 21 Illinois | 11 | – | 5 | .688 | 22 | – | 10 | .688 |
| No. 22 Indiana | 10 | – | 6 | .625 | 20 | – | 9 | .690 |
| Wisconsin | 8 | – | 8 | .500 | 22 | – | 14 | .611 |
| Iowa | 6 | – | 10 | .375 | 14 | – | 16 | .467 |
| Michigan | 6 | – | 10 | .375 | 15 | – | 14 | .517 |
| Penn State | 5 | – | 11 | .313 | 19 | – | 16 | .543 |
| Minnesota | 4 | – | 12 | .250 | 12 | – | 16 | .429 |
| Northwestern | 0 | – | 16 | .000 | 5 | – | 25 | .167 |
| No. 8 Ohio State* | 5 | – | 1 | .833 | 11 | – | 3 | .786 |
† 2000 Big Ten tournament winner Rankings from AP poll *Ohio State: 14 reg. season games; 2 NCAA Tourn. games vacated due to sanctions against the program Disputed record: Ohio State (23–7) (13–3)

1999–2000 Big West men's basketball standings
| | Conf. | | | | Overall |
| Team | W | | L | PCT | W | | L | PCT |
|---|---|---|---|---|---|---|---|---|
East Division
| Utah State† | 16 | – | 0 | 1.000 | 28 | – | 6 | .824 |
| New Mexico State | 11 | – | 5 | .688 | 22 | – | 10 | .688 |
| Nevada | 6 | – | 10 | .375 | 9 | – | 20 | .310 |
| Idaho | 6 | – | 10 | .375 | 12 | – | 17 | .414 |
| Boise State | 6 | – | 10 | .375 | 12 | – | 15 | .444 |
| North Texas | 5 | – | 11 | .313 | 7 | – | 20 | .259 |
West Division
| Long Beach State | 15 | – | 1 | .938 | 24 | – | 6 | .800 |
| UC Santa Barbara | 10 | – | 6 | .625 | 14 | – | 14 | .500 |
| UC Irvine | 7 | – | 9 | .438 | 14 | – | 14 | .500 |
| Pacific | 6 | – | 10 | .375 | 11 | – | 18 | .379 |
| Cal Poly | 5 | – | 11 | .313 | 10 | – | 18 | .357 |
| Cal State Fullerton | 3 | – | 13 | .188 | 8 | – | 19 | .296 |
† 2000 Big West tournament winner As of April 10, 2000; Rankings from AP poll

1999–2000 CAA men's basketball standings
| | Conf. | | | | Overall |
| Team | W | | L | PCT | W | | L | PCT |
|---|---|---|---|---|---|---|---|---|
| George Mason | 12 | – | 4 | .750 | 19 | – | 11 | .633 |
| James Madison | 12 | – | 4 | .750 | 20 | – | 9 | .690 |
| Richmond | 11 | – | 5 | .688 | 18 | – | 12 | .600 |
| UNC Wilmington † | 8 | – | 8 | .500 | 18 | – | 13 | .581 |
| VCU | 7 | – | 9 | .438 | 14 | – | 14 | .500 |
| Old Dominion | 6 | – | 10 | .375 | 11 | – | 19 | .367 |
| William & Mary | 6 | – | 10 | .375 | 11 | – | 17 | .393 |
| American | 5 | – | 11 | .313 | 11 | – | 18 | .379 |
| East Carolina | 5 | – | 11 | .313 | 10 | – | 18 | .357 |
† 2000 CAA tournament winner Rankings from AP Poll

1999–2000 Conference USA men's basketball standings
| | Conf. | | | | Overall |
| Team | W | | L | PCT | W | | L | PCT |
|---|---|---|---|---|---|---|---|---|
American
| No. 7 Cincinnati | 16 | – | 0 | 1.000 | 29 | – | 4 | .879 |
| Louisville | 10 | – | 6 | .625 | 19 | – | 12 | .613 |
| DePaul | 9 | – | 7 | .563 | 21 | – | 12 | .636 |
| Marquette | 8 | – | 8 | .500 | 15 | – | 14 | .517 |
| Saint Louis † | 7 | – | 9 | .438 | 19 | – | 14 | .576 |
| Charlotte | 7 | – | 9 | .438 | 17 | – | 16 | .515 |
National
| Tulane | 8 | – | 8 | .500 | 20 | – | 11 | .645 |
| South Florida | 8 | – | 8 | .500 | 17 | – | 14 | .548 |
| Southern Miss | 7 | – | 9 | .438 | 17 | – | 12 | .586 |
| UAB | 7 | – | 9 | .438 | 14 | – | 14 | .500 |
| Memphis | 7 | – | 9 | .438 | 15 | – | 16 | .484 |
| Houston | 2 | – | 14 | .125 | 9 | – | 22 | .290 |
† 2000 Conference USA Tournament winner Rankings from AP Poll

1999–2000 Ivy League men's basketball standings
| | Conf. | | | | Overall |
| Team | W | | L | PCT | W | | L | PCT |
|---|---|---|---|---|---|---|---|---|
| Penn | 14 | – | 0 | 1.000 | 21 | – | 8 | .724 |
| Princeton | 11 | – | 3 | .786 | 19 | – | 11 | .633 |
| Columbia | 7 | – | 7 | .500 | 13 | – | 14 | .481 |
| Harvard | 7 | – | 7 | .500 | 12 | – | 15 | .444 |
| Dartmouth | 5 | – | 9 | .357 | 9 | – | 18 | .333 |
| Yale | 5 | – | 9 | .357 | 7 | – | 20 | .259 |
| Brown | 4 | – | 10 | .286 | 8 | – | 19 | .296 |
| Cornell | 3 | – | 11 | .214 | 10 | – | 17 | .370 |
Rankings from AP Poll

1999–2000 MAAC men's basketball standings
| | Conf. | | | | Overall |
| Team | W | | L | PCT | W | | L | PCT |
|---|---|---|---|---|---|---|---|---|
| Siena | 15 | – | 3 | .833 | 24 | – | 9 | .727 |
| Iona † | 13 | – | 5 | .722 | 20 | – | 11 | .645 |
| Fairfield | 11 | – | 7 | .611 | 14 | – | 15 | .483 |
| Marist | 10 | – | 8 | .556 | 14 | – | 14 | .500 |
| Niagara | 10 | – | 8 | .556 | 17 | – | 12 | .586 |
| Manhattan | 9 | – | 9 | .500 | 12 | – | 15 | .444 |
| Rider | 8 | – | 10 | .444 | 16 | – | 14 | .533 |
| Canisius | 8 | – | 10 | .444 | 10 | – | 20 | .333 |
| Loyola (MD) | 4 | – | 14 | .222 | 7 | – | 21 | .250 |
| Saint Peter's | 2 | – | 16 | .111 | 5 | – | 23 | .179 |
† 2000 MAAC tournament winner Rankings from AP Poll

1999–2000 Mid-American Conference men's basketball standings
| | Conf. | | | | Overall |
| Team | W | | L | PCT | W | | L | PCT |
|---|---|---|---|---|---|---|---|---|
East
| Bowling Green | 14 | – | 4 | .778 | 22 | – | 8 | .733 |
| Kent State | 13 | – | 5 | .722 | 23 | – | 8 | .742 |
| Akron | 11 | – | 7 | .611 | 17 | – | 11 | .607 |
| Marshall | 11 | – | 7 | .611 | 21 | – | 9 | .700 |
| Ohio | 11 | – | 7 | .611 | 20 | – | 13 | .606 |
| Miami | 8 | – | 10 | .444 | 15 | – | 15 | .500 |
| Buffalo | 3 | – | 15 | .167 | 5 | – | 23 | .179 |
West
| Ball State† | 11 | – | 7 | .611 | 22 | – | 9 | .710 |
| Toledo | 11 | – | 7 | .611 | 18 | – | 13 | .581 |
| Eastern Michigan | 9 | – | 9 | .500 | 15 | – | 13 | .536 |
| Northern Illinois | 7 | – | 11 | .389 | 13 | – | 15 | .464 |
| Western Michigan | 6 | – | 12 | .333 | 10 | – | 18 | .357 |
| Central Michigan | 2 | – | 16 | .111 | 6 | – | 23 | .207 |
† 2000 MAC tournament winner As of Rankings from AP Poll

1999–2000 Mid-Continent Conference men's basketball standings
| | Conf. | | | | Overall |
| Team | W | | L | PCT | W | | L | PCT |
|---|---|---|---|---|---|---|---|---|
| Oakland | 11 | – | 5 | .688 | 13 | – | 17 | .433 |
| Valparaiso † | 10 | – | 6 | .625 | 19 | – | 13 | .594 |
| Southern Utah | 10 | – | 6 | .625 | 16 | – | 13 | .552 |
| Missouri–Kansas City | 10 | – | 6 | .625 | 16 | – | 13 | .552 |
| Youngstown State | 9 | – | 7 | .563 | 12 | – | 16 | .429 |
| Oral Roberts | 8 | – | 8 | .500 | 13 | – | 17 | .433 |
| Chicago State | 7 | – | 9 | .438 | 10 | – | 18 | .357 |
| IUPUI | 4 | – | 12 | .250 | 7 | – | 21 | .250 |
| Western Illinois | 3 | – | 13 | .188 | 8 | – | 22 | .267 |
† 2000 Mid-Con Tournament winner

1999–2000 MEAC men's basketball standings
| | Conf. | | | | Overall |
| Team | W | | L | PCT | W | | L | PCT |
|---|---|---|---|---|---|---|---|---|
| South Carolina State † | 14 | – | 5 | .737 | 20 | – | 14 | .588 |
| Hampton | 13 | – | 5 | .722 | 17 | – | 12 | .586 |
| Coppin State | 13 | – | 5 | .722 | 15 | – | 15 | .500 |
| Bethune–Cookman | 12 | – | 6 | .667 | 14 | – | 15 | .483 |
| Norfolk State | 11 | – | 7 | .611 | 12 | – | 16 | .429 |
| North Carolina A&T | 11 | – | 8 | .579 | 14 | – | 15 | .483 |
| Maryland Eastern Shore | 8 | – | 10 | .444 | 12 | – | 17 | .414 |
| Florida A&M | 7 | – | 11 | .389 | 9 | – | 22 | .290 |
| Delaware State | 5 | – | 13 | .278 | 6 | – | 22 | .214 |
| Morgan State | 5 | – | 13 | .278 | 5 | – | 24 | .172 |
| Howard | 1 | – | 17 | .056 | 1 | – | 27 | .036 |
† 2000 MEAC tournament winner Rankings from AP Poll

1999–2000 Midwestern Collegiate Conference men's basketball standings
| | Conf. | | | | Overall |
| Team | W | | L | PCT | W | | L | PCT |
|---|---|---|---|---|---|---|---|---|
| Butler † | 12 | – | 2 | .857 | 23 | – | 8 | .742 |
| Cleveland State | 9 | – | 5 | .643 | 16 | – | 14 | .533 |
| Detroit | 8 | – | 6 | .571 | 20 | – | 12 | .625 |
| Green Bay | 6 | – | 8 | .429 | 14 | – | 16 | .467 |
| Milwaukee | 6 | – | 8 | .429 | 15 | – | 14 | .517 |
| Wright State | 6 | – | 8 | .429 | 11 | – | 17 | .393 |
| UIC | 5 | – | 9 | .357 | 11 | – | 20 | .355 |
| Loyola Chicago | 4 | – | 10 | .286 | 14 | – | 14 | .500 |
† 2000 MCC tournament winner

1999–2000 Missouri Valley Conference men's basketball standings
| | Conf. | | | | Overall |
| Team | W | | L | PCT | W | | L | PCT |
|---|---|---|---|---|---|---|---|---|
| Indiana State | 14 | – | 4 | .778 | 22 | – | 10 | .688 |
| Southwest Missouri State | 13 | – | 5 | .722 | 23 | – | 11 | .676 |
| Southern Illinois | 12 | – | 6 | .667 | 20 | – | 13 | .606 |
| Creighton † | 11 | – | 7 | .611 | 23 | – | 10 | .697 |
| Bradley | 10 | – | 8 | .556 | 14 | – | 16 | .467 |
| Evansville | 9 | – | 9 | .500 | 18 | – | 12 | .600 |
| Northern Iowa | 7 | – | 11 | .389 | 14 | – | 15 | .483 |
| Illinois State | 5 | – | 13 | .278 | 10 | – | 20 | .333 |
| Wichita State | 5 | – | 13 | .278 | 12 | – | 17 | .414 |
| Drake | 4 | – | 14 | .222 | 11 | – | 18 | .379 |
† 2000 MVC tournament winner Rankings from AP Poll

1999–2000 Mountain West Conference men's basketball standings
| | Conf. | | | | Overall |
| Team | W | | L | PCT | W | | L | PCT |
|---|---|---|---|---|---|---|---|---|
| UNLV † | 10 | – | 4 | .714 | 23 | – | 8 | .742 |
| Utah | 10 | – | 4 | .714 | 23 | – | 9 | .719 |
| New Mexico | 9 | – | 5 | .643 | 18 | – | 14 | .563 |
| Colorado State | 8 | – | 6 | .571 | 18 | – | 12 | .600 |
| Wyoming | 8 | – | 6 | .571 | 19 | – | 12 | .613 |
| BYU | 7 | – | 7 | .500 | 22 | – | 11 | .667 |
| Air Force | 4 | – | 10 | .286 | 8 | – | 20 | .286 |
| San Diego State | 0 | – | 14 | .000 | 5 | – | 23 | .179 |
† 2000 Mountain West tournament winner Rankings from AP Poll

1999–2000 Northeast Conference men's basketball standings
| | Conf. | | | | Overall |
| Team | W | | L | PCT | W | | L | PCT |
|---|---|---|---|---|---|---|---|---|
| Central Connecticut † | 15 | – | 3 | .833 | 25 | – | 6 | .806 |
| Fairleigh Dickinson | 13 | – | 5 | .722 | 17 | – | 11 | .607 |
| Robert Morris | 13 | – | 5 | .722 | 18 | – | 12 | .600 |
| St. Francis Brooklyn | 12 | – | 6 | .667 | 18 | – | 12 | .600 |
| Quinnipiac | 12 | – | 6 | .667 | 18 | – | 10 | .643 |
| Monmouth | 9 | – | 9 | .500 | 12 | – | 16 | .429 |
| Saint Francis (PA) | 7 | – | 11 | .389 | 10 | – | 18 | .357 |
| Mount St. Mary's | 7 | – | 11 | .389 | 9 | – | 20 | .310 |
| UMBC | 7 | – | 11 | .389 | 11 | – | 18 | .379 |
| Wagner | 6 | – | 12 | .333 | 11 | – | 16 | .407 |
| Long Island | 5 | – | 13 | .278 | 8 | – | 19 | .296 |
| Sacred Heart | 2 | – | 16 | .111 | 3 | – | 25 | .107 |
† 2000 NEC tournament winner

1999–2000 Ohio Valley Conference men's basketball standings
| | Conf. | | | | Overall |
| Team | W | | L | PCT | W | | L | PCT |
|---|---|---|---|---|---|---|---|---|
| Murray State | 14 | – | 4 | .778 | 23 | – | 9 | .719 |
| Southeast Missouri State † | 14 | – | 4 | .778 | 24 | – | 7 | .774 |
| Tennessee Tech | 11 | – | 7 | .611 | 16 | – | 12 | .571 |
| Eastern Illinois | 11 | – | 7 | .611 | 17 | – | 12 | .586 |
| Austin Peay | 11 | – | 7 | .611 | 18 | – | 10 | .643 |
| Middle Tennessee | 10 | – | 8 | .556 | 15 | – | 13 | .536 |
| UT Martin | 7 | – | 11 | .389 | 10 | – | 19 | .345 |
| Tennessee State | 6 | – | 12 | .333 | 7 | – | 22 | .241 |
| Morehead State | 4 | – | 14 | .222 | 9 | – | 18 | .333 |
| Eastern Kentucky | 2 | – | 16 | .111 | 6 | – | 21 | .222 |
† 2000 Ohio Valley Tournament winner Rankings from AP Poll

1999–2000 Pacific-10 Conference men's basketball standings
| | Conf. | | | | Overall |
| Team | W | | L | PCT | W | | L | PCT |
|---|---|---|---|---|---|---|---|---|
| No. 8 Arizona | 15 | – | 3 | .833 | 27 | – | 7 | .794 |
| No. 5 Stanford | 15 | – | 3 | .833 | 27 | – | 4 | .871 |
| Oregon | 13 | – | 5 | .722 | 22 | – | 8 | .733 |
| No. 23 UCLA | 10 | – | 8 | .556 | 21 | – | 12 | .636 |
| Arizona State | 10 | – | 8 | .556 | 18 | – | 12 | .600 |
| USC | 9 | – | 9 | .500 | 16 | – | 14 | .533 |
| California | 7 | – | 11 | .389 | 16 | – | 14 | .533 |
| Oregon State | 5 | – | 13 | .278 | 13 | – | 16 | .448 |
| Washington | 5 | – | 13 | .278 | 10 | – | 20 | .333 |
| Washington State | 1 | – | 17 | .056 | 6 | – | 22 | .214 |
As of July 26, 2011; Rankings from AP Poll

1999–2000 Patriot League men's basketball standings
| | Conf. | | | | Overall |
| Team | W | | L | PCT | W | | L | PCT |
|---|---|---|---|---|---|---|---|---|
| Navy | 11 | – | 1 | .917 | 23 | – | 6 | .793 |
| Lafayette † | 11 | – | 1 | .917 | 24 | – | 7 | .774 |
| Bucknell | 8 | – | 4 | .667 | 17 | – | 11 | .607 |
| Colgate | 4 | – | 8 | .333 | 13 | – | 16 | .448 |
| Holy Cross | 3 | – | 9 | .250 | 10 | – | 18 | .357 |
| Lehigh | 3 | – | 9 | .250 | 8 | – | 21 | .276 |
| Army | 2 | – | 10 | .167 | 5 | – | 23 | .179 |
† 2000 Patriot League tournament winner

1999–2000 Southeastern Conference men's basketball standings
| | Conf. | | | | Overall |
| Team | W | | L | PCT | W | | L | PCT |
|---|---|---|---|---|---|---|---|---|
East
| No. 13 Florida | 12 | – | 4 | .750 | 29 | – | 8 | .784 |
| No. 11 Tennessee | 12 | – | 4 | .750 | 26 | – | 7 | .788 |
| No. 19 Kentucky | 12 | – | 4 | .750 | 23 | – | 10 | .697 |
| Vanderbilt | 8 | – | 8 | .500 | 19 | – | 11 | .633 |
| South Carolina | 5 | – | 11 | .313 | 15 | – | 17 | .469 |
| Georgia | 3 | – | 13 | .188 | 10 | – | 20 | .333 |
West
| No. 10 LSU | 12 | – | 4 | .750 | 28 | – | 6 | .824 |
| No. 24 Auburn | 9 | – | 7 | .563 | 24 | – | 10 | .706 |
| Arkansas † | 7 | – | 9 | .438 | 19 | – | 15 | .559 |
| Alabama | 6 | – | 10 | .375 | 13 | – | 16 | .448 |
| Ole Miss | 5 | – | 11 | .313 | 19 | – | 14 | .576 |
| Mississippi State | 5 | – | 11 | .313 | 14 | – | 16 | .467 |
† 2000 SEC tournament winner Rankings from AP Poll

1999–2000 Southern Conference men's basketball standings
| | Conf. | | | | Overall |
| Team | W | | L | PCT | W | | L | PCT |
|---|---|---|---|---|---|---|---|---|
North
| Appalachian State† | 13 | – | 3 | .813 | 23 | – | 9 | .719 |
| Davidson | 10 | – | 6 | .625 | 15 | – | 13 | .536 |
| UNC Greensboro | 9 | – | 7 | .563 | 15 | – | 13 | .536 |
| East Tennessee State | 8 | – | 8 | .500 | 14 | – | 15 | .483 |
| Western Carolina | 7 | – | 9 | .438 | 14 | – | 14 | .500 |
| VMI | 1 | – | 15 | .063 | 6 | – | 23 | .207 |
South
| College of Charleston | 13 | – | 3 | .813 | 24 | – | 6 | .800 |
| Georgia Southern | 10 | – | 6 | .625 | 16 | – | 12 | .571 |
| Wofford | 8 | – | 8 | .500 | 14 | – | 16 | .467 |
| Chattanooga | 6 | – | 10 | .375 | 10 | – | 19 | .345 |
| The Citadel | 5 | – | 10 | .333 | 9 | – | 20 | .310 |
| Furman | 5 | – | 10 | .333 | 14 | – | 18 | .438 |
† SoCon Tournament winner As of April 30, 2000; Rankings from AP poll

1999–2000 Southland Conference men's basketball standings
| | Conf. | | | | Overall |
| Team | W | | L | PCT | W | | L | PCT |
|---|---|---|---|---|---|---|---|---|
| Sam Houston State | 15 | – | 3 | .833 | 22 | – | 7 | .759 |
| Louisiana–Monroe | 13 | – | 5 | .722 | 19 | – | 9 | .679 |
| UTSA | 12 | – | 6 | .667 | 15 | – | 13 | .536 |
| Northwestern State | 11 | – | 7 | .611 | 17 | – | 13 | .567 |
| Texas–Arlington | 11 | – | 7 | .611 | 15 | – | 12 | .556 |
| Lamar † | 8 | – | 10 | .444 | 15 | – | 16 | .484 |
| Southwest Texas State | 8 | – | 10 | .444 | 12 | – | 17 | .414 |
| Nicholls State | 8 | – | 10 | .444 | 11 | – | 17 | .393 |
| Southeastern Louisiana | 5 | – | 13 | .278 | 10 | – | 17 | .370 |
| McNeese State | 5 | – | 13 | .278 | 6 | – | 21 | .222 |
| Stephen F. Austin | 3 | – | 15 | .167 | 6 | – | 21 | .222 |
† 2000 Southland Conference tournament winner Rankings from AP Poll

1999–2000 SWAC men's basketball standings
| | Conf. | | | | Overall |
| Team | W | | L | PCT | W | | L | PCT |
|---|---|---|---|---|---|---|---|---|
| Alcorn State | 15 | – | 3 | .833 | 19 | – | 10 | .655 |
| Alabama A&M | 14 | – | 4 | .778 | 18 | – | 10 | .643 |
| Southern | 14 | – | 4 | .778 | 18 | – | 11 | .621 |
| Texas Southern | 10 | – | 8 | .556 | 15 | – | 14 | .517 |
| Jackson State † | 10 | – | 8 | .556 | 17 | – | 16 | .515 |
| Alabama State | 10 | – | 8 | .556 | 13 | – | 15 | .464 |
| Mississippi Valley State | 7 | – | 11 | .389 | 6 | – | 21 | .222 |
| Prairie View A&M | 5 | – | 13 | .278 | 7 | – | 20 | .259 |
| Arkansas–Pine Bluff | 5 | – | 13 | .278 | 6 | – | 21 | .222 |
| Grambling State | 0 | – | 18 | .000 | 1 | – | 30 | .032 |
† 2000 SWAC tournament winner Rankings from AP Poll

1999–2000 Sun Belt Conference men's basketball standings
| | Conf. | | | | Overall |
| Team | W | | L | PCT | W | | L | PCT |
|---|---|---|---|---|---|---|---|---|
| South Alabama | 13 | – | 3 | .813 | 20 | – | 10 | .667 |
| Louisiana–Lafayette † | 13 | – | 3 | .813 | 25 | – | 9 | .735 |
| Louisiana Tech | 12 | – | 4 | .750 | 21 | – | 8 | .724 |
| Florida International | 9 | – | 7 | .563 | 16 | – | 14 | .533 |
| Western Kentucky | 8 | – | 8 | .500 | 11 | – | 18 | .379 |
| Arkansas State | 7 | – | 9 | .438 | 10 | – | 18 | .357 |
| New Orleans | 6 | – | 10 | .375 | 11 | – | 18 | .379 |
| Denver | 3 | – | 13 | .188 | 6 | – | 22 | .214 |
| Arkansas-Little Rock | 1 | – | 15 | .063 | 4 | – | 24 | .143 |
† 2000 Sun Belt Conference tournament winner Rankings from AP Poll

1999–2000 Trans America Athletic Conference men's basketball standings
| | Conf. | | | | Overall |
| Team | W | | L | PCT | W | | L | PCT |
|---|---|---|---|---|---|---|---|---|
| Troy State | 13 | – | 5 | .722 | 17 | – | 11 | .607 |
| Georgia State | 13 | – | 5 | .722 | 17 | – | 12 | .586 |
| Samford † | 12 | – | 6 | .667 | 21 | – | 11 | .656 |
| Jacksonville State | 12 | – | 6 | .667 | 17 | – | 11 | .607 |
| UCF | 10 | – | 8 | .556 | 14 | – | 18 | .438 |
| Campbell | 10 | – | 8 | .556 | 12 | – | 16 | .429 |
| Stetson | 8 | – | 10 | .444 | 13 | – | 15 | .464 |
| Mercer | 7 | – | 11 | .389 | 12 | – | 21 | .364 |
| Jacksonville | 5 | – | 13 | .278 | 8 | – | 19 | .296 |
| Florida Atlantic | 0 | – | 18 | .000 | 2 | – | 28 | .067 |
† 2000 TAAC tournament winner Rankings from AP Poll

1999–2000 West Coast Conference men's basketball standings
| | Conf. | | | | Overall |
| Team | W | | L | PCT | W | | L | PCT |
|---|---|---|---|---|---|---|---|---|
| Pepperdine | 12 | – | 2 | .857 | 25 | – | 9 | .735 |
| Gonzaga † | 11 | – | 3 | .786 | 26 | – | 9 | .743 |
| San Diego | 10 | – | 4 | .714 | 20 | – | 9 | .690 |
| Santa Clara | 9 | – | 5 | .643 | 19 | – | 12 | .613 |
| San Francisco | 7 | – | 7 | .500 | 19 | – | 9 | .679 |
| Portland | 4 | – | 10 | .286 | 10 | – | 18 | .357 |
| Saint Mary's | 3 | – | 11 | .214 | 8 | – | 20 | .286 |
| Loyola Marymount | 0 | – | 14 | .000 | 2 | – | 26 | .071 |
† 2000 WCC tournament winner Rankings from AP poll

1999–2000 WAC men's basketball standings
| | Conf. | | | | Overall |
| Team | W | | L | PCT | W | | L | PCT |
|---|---|---|---|---|---|---|---|---|
| No. 18 Tulsa | 12 | – | 2 | .857 | 32 | – | 5 | .865 |
| Fresno State † | 11 | – | 3 | .786 | 24 | – | 10 | .706 |
| SMU | 9 | – | 5 | .643 | 21 | – | 9 | .700 |
| TCU | 8 | – | 6 | .571 | 18 | – | 14 | .563 |
| San Jose State | 6 | – | 8 | .429 | 15 | – | 15 | .500 |
| Hawaii | 5 | – | 9 | .357 | 17 | – | 12 | .586 |
| UTEP | 4 | – | 10 | .286 | 13 | – | 15 | .464 |
| Rice | 1 | – | 13 | .071 | 5 | – | 22 | .185 |
† 2000 WAC tournament winner Rankings from AP Poll

=== Division I independents ===
Five schools played as Division I independents.

1999–2000 NCAA Division I men's basketball independents standings
| | Conf. | | | | Overall |
| Team | W | | L | PCT | W | | L | PCT |
|---|---|---|---|---|---|---|---|---|
| Texas–Pan American | - | – | - | – | 12 | – | 16 | .429 |
| Albany | - | – | - | – | 11 | – | 17 | .393 |
| Centenary | - | – | - | – | 10 | – | 18 | .357 |
| Belmont | - | – | - | – | 7 | – | 21 | .250 |
| Stony Brook | - | – | - | – | 6 | – | 23 | .207 |
Rankings from AP Poll

=== Informal championships ===
| Conference | Regular season winner | Most Valuable Player |
|---|---|---|
| Philadelphia Big 5 | Temple & Villanova | Pepe Sánchez, Temple |

After eight seasons in which each of Philadelphia Big 5 member played only two games against other Big 5 schools each year, the Big 5 returned to a full round-robin schedule in which each team met each other team once, a format it had used from its first season of competition in 1955–56 through the 1990–91 season. Temple and Villanova both finished with 3–1 records in head-to-head competition among the Big 5.

=== Statistical leaders ===
Source for additional stats categories

| Points per game | | | Rebounds per game | | | Assists per game | | | Steals per game | | |
| Player | School | PPG | Player | School | RPG | Player | School | APG | Player | School | SPG |
| Courtney Alexander | Fresno St. | 24.8 | Darren Phillip | Fairfield | 14.0 | Mark Dickel | UNLV | 9.0 | Carl Williams | Liberty | 3.8 |
| SirValiant Brown | George Washington | 24.6 | Josh Sankes | Holy Cross | 11.9 | Doug Gottlieb | Oklahoma St. | 8.6 | Rick Mickens | C. Conn. St. | 3.6 |
| Ronnie McCollum | Centenary | 23.8 | Larry Abney | Fresno St. | 11.8 | Chico Fletcher | Arkansas St. | 8.3 | Pepe Sanchez | Temple | 3.4 |
| Eddie House | Arizona St. | 23.0 | Shaun Stonerook | Ohio | 11.7 | Brandon Granville | USC | 8.3 | Fred House | Southern Utah | 3.4 |
| Harold Arceneaux | Weber St. | 23.0 | Jarrett Stephens | Penn St. | 10.5 | Ed Cota | North Carolina | 8.1 | Eric Coley | Tulsa | 3.3 |

| Blocked shots per game | | | Field-goal percentage | | | Three-Point FG percentage | | | Free-throw percentage | | |
| Player | School | BPG | Player | School | FG% | Player | School | 3FG% | Player | School | FT% |
| Ken Johnson | Ohio St. | 5.4 | Brendan Haywood | North Carolina | 69.7 | Jonathan Whitworth | Middle Tenn. St. | 50.5 | Clay McKnight | Pacific | 94.9 |
| Wojciech Myrda | LA-Monroe | 5.1 | John Whorton | Kent St. | 63.6 | Jason Thornton | Central Florida | 49.5 | Troy Bell | Boston College | 89.4 |
| Loren Woods | Arizona | 3.9 | Joel Przybilla | Minnesota | 61.3 | Aki Palmer | Colorado St. | 49.0 | Lee Nosse | Middle Tenn. St. | 89.2 |
| Joel Przybilla | Minnesota | 3.9 | Stromile Swift | LSU | 60.8 | Pete Conway | Montana St. | 48.9 | Khalid El-Amin | UConn | 89.2 |
| Sitapha Savane | Navy | 3.8 | Patrick Chambers | AR-Pine Bluff | 60.6 | Stephen Brown | Idaho St. | 48.9 | Brad Buddenborg | Oakland | 89.2 |

== Post-season tournaments ==
=== NCAA tournament ===
==== Final Four – RCA Dome, Indianapolis, Indiana ====
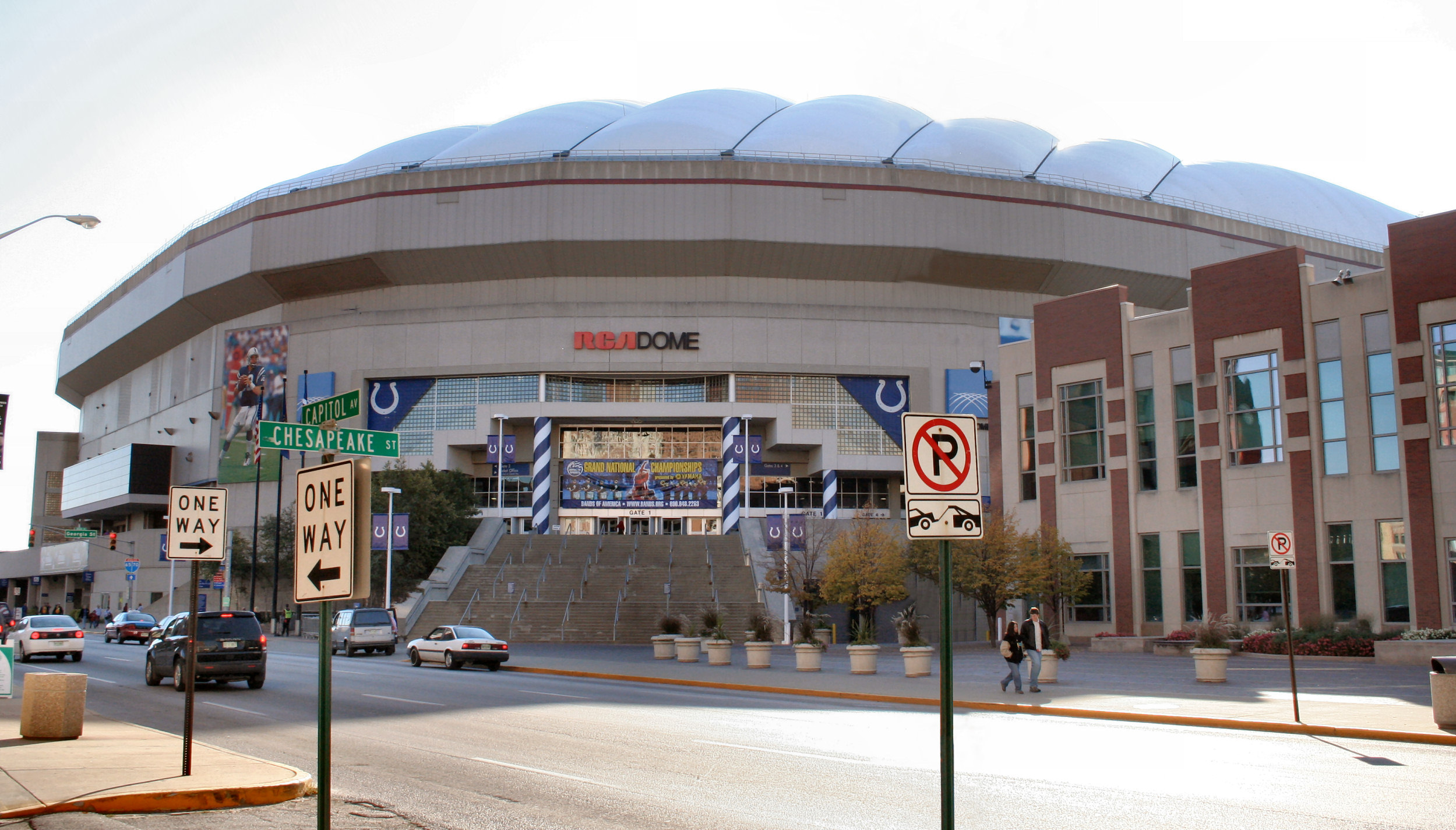
The RCA Dome in Indianapolis, Indiana, was the site of the Final Four and Championship game to end the 1999–2000 season.

National semifinals
E5 | Florida | 71
S8 | North Carolina | 59
M1 | Michigan State | 53
W8 | Wisconsin | 41

National championship game
E5 | Florida | 76
M1 | Michigan State | 89

=== National Invitation tournament ===
==== Semifinals & finals ====
Semifinals
Penn State | 52
Notre Dame | 73
N.C. State | 59
Wake Forest | 62

Finals
Notre Dame | 61
Wake Forest | 71
Third place
Penn State | 74
N.C. State | 72

== Award winners ==
=== Consensus All-American teams ===
Consensus First Team
| Player | Position | Class | Team |
|---|---|---|---|
| Chris Carrawell | F | Senior | Duke |
| Marcus Fizer | F | Junior | Iowa State |
| A.J. Guyton | G | Senior | Indiana |
| Kenyon Martin | C/F | Senior | Cincinnati |
| Chris Mihm | C | Junior | Texas |
| Troy Murphy | F | Sophomore | Notre Dame |

Consensus Second Team
| Player | Position | Class | Team |
|---|---|---|---|
| Courtney Alexander | G/F | Senior | Fresno State |
| Shane Battier | F | Junior | Duke |
| Mateen Cleaves | G | Senior | Michigan State |
| Scoonie Penn | G | Senior | Ohio State |
| Morris Peterson | F | Senior | Michigan State |
| Stromile Swift | F/C | Sophomore | Louisiana State |

=== Major player of the year awards ===
- Wooden Award: Kenyon Martin, Cincinnati
- Naismith Award: Kenyon Martin, Cincinnati
- Associated Press Player of the Year: Kenyon Martin, Cincinnati
- NABC Player of the Year: Kenyon Martin, Cincinnati
- Oscar Robertson Trophy (USBWA): Kenyon Martin, Cincinnati
- Adolph Rupp Trophy: Kenyon Martin, Cincinnati
- Sporting News Player of the Year: Kenyon Martin, Cincinnati

=== Major freshman of the year awards ===
- USBWA Freshman of the Year: Jason Gardner, Arizona
- Sporting News Freshman of the Year: Jason Williams, Duke

=== Major coach of the year awards ===
- Associated Press Coach of the Year: Larry Eustachy, Iowa State
- Henry Iba Award (USBWA): Larry Eustachy, Iowa State
- NABC Coach of the Year: Gene Keady, Purdue
- Naismith College Coach of the Year: Mike Montgomery, Stanford
- CBS/Chevrolet Coach of the Year: Mike Krzyzewski, Duke
- Sporting News Coach of the Year: Bob Huggins, Cincinnati & Bill Self, Tulsa

=== Other major awards ===
- Pete Newell Big Man Award (Best big man): Marcus Fizer, Iowa State
- NABC Defensive Player of the Year: Shane Battier, Duke & Kenyon Martin, Cincinnati
- Frances Pomeroy Naismith Award (Best player under 6'0): Scoonie Penn, Ohio State
- Robert V. Geasey Trophy (Top player in Philadelphia Big 5): Pepe Sanchez, Temple
- NIT/Haggerty Award (Top player in New York City metro area): Craig "Speedy" Claxton, Hofstra
- Chip Hilton Player of the Year Award (Strong personal character): Eduardo Nájera, Oklahoma

== Coaching changes ==
A number of teams changed coaches throughout the season and after the season ended.

| Team | Former Coach | Interim Coach | New Coach | Reason |
|---|---|---|---|---|
| Ari Force | Reggie Minton | | Joe Scott | Air Force hired Pete Carril disciple Scott to install the Princeton offense. |
| Albany | Scott Hicks | | Scott Beeton | |
| American | Art Perry | | Jeff Jones | American tabbed former Virginia coach Jones. |
| Appalachian State | Buzz Peterson | | Houston Fancher | |
| Arkansas–Little Rock | Sidney Moncrief | | Porter Moser | Arkansas legend Moncrief left after only one season to become an assistant with the Dallas Mavericks. |
| Ball State | Ray McCallum | | Tim Buckley | McCallum left his alma mater for Houston. Wisconsin assistant Buckley was tapped to replace him. |
| Buffalo | Tim Cohane | | Reggie Witherspoon | Witherspoon was hired from Erie Community College. |
| Butler | Barry Collier | | Thad Matta | Collier left for Nebraska, turning the program over to top assistant Matta. |
| Cal State Fullerton | Bob Hawking | | Donny Daniels | |
| Charleston Southern | Tom Conrad | | Jim Platt | |
| Colorado State | Ritchie McKay | | Dale Layer | |
| Cornell | Scott Thompson | | Steve Donahue | |
| Delaware | Mike Brey | | David Henderson | Brey left to take the Notre Dame job and was replaced by former Duke player and assistant coach Henderson. |
| Delaware State | Tony Sheals | Stephen Wilson | Greg Jackson | |
| Eastern Kentucky | Scott Perry | | Travis Ford | EKU hired former Kentucky player Ford. |
| Eastern Michigan | Milton Barnes | | Jim Boone | |
| Eastern Washington | Steve Aggers | | Ray Giacoletti | |
| FIU | Shakey Rodriguez | | Donnie Marsh | |
| Georgia Tech | Bobby Cremins | | Paul Hewitt | Cremins stepped down after 19 seasons and resurrecting the Yellow Jackets program. |
| Houston | Clyde Drexler | | Ray McCallum | Houston legend Drexler left after two disappointing seasons at the helm. |
| Howard | Kirk Saulny | Willie Coward | Frankie Allen | Saulny was fired midseason after an investigation found that he had broken NCAA and school rules. |
| Illinois | Lon Kruger | | Bill Self | Kruger left for the head coaching position with the Atlanta Hawks |
| Indiana | Bob Knight | Mike Davis | | Knight was fired on September 10, 2000, after an altercation with an IU student – a violation of the "zero tolerance" agreement he was under. Assistant Davis was hired as interim coach, then given the permanent job after the 2000–01 season. |
| Jacksonville State | Mark Turgeon | | Mark LaPlante | |
| Kansas State | Tom Asbury | | Jim Wooldridge | |
| Loyola (MD) | Dino Gaudio | | Scott Hicks | Gaudio resigned after three seasons and was replaced by Albany head man Hicks. |
| Loyola Marymount | Charles Bradley | | Steve Aggers | |
| Memphis | Johnny Jones | | John Calipari | Price was forced to resign days before the beginning of the 1999–2000 season. Jones was named interim for the season. Memphis made a big name hire by bringing in former UMass and New Jersey Nets coach Calipari. |
| Miami (FL) | Leonard Hamilton | | Perry Clark | Miami hired former Tulane boss Clark after Hamilton left to coach the Washington Wizards. |
| UMKC | Bob Sundvold | | Dean Demopoulos | |
| Nebraska | Danny Nee | | Barry Collier | Nebraska fired Nee and hired Butler's Collier. |
| North Carolina | Bill Guthridge | | Matt Doherty | Guthridge retired after three seasons. Doherty was hired after a lengthy search that followed Kansas' Roy Williams staying in Lawrence. |
| Northwestern | Kevin O'Neill | | Bill Carmody | Northwestern brought in Princeton coach Carmody to replace O'Neill, who left for an assistant coach position with the New York Knicks. |
| Notre Dame | Matt Doherty | | Mike Brey | Doherty left for North Carolina only one year in South Bend. |
| Oregon State | Eddie Payne | | Ritchie McKay | Payne was fired unexpectedly and replaced by Colorado State's McKay. |
| Princeton | Bill Carmody | | John Thompson III | Top aide Thompson III was hired to replace Carmody. |
| Robert Morris | Jim Boone | | Danny Nee | |
| Sacramento State | Tom Abatemarco | | Jerome Jenkins | |
| Siena | Paul Hewitt | | Louis Orr | Siena hires former Syracuse star Orr. |
| Saint Peter's | Rodger Blind | | Bob Leckie | |
| Southwest Texas State | Mike Miller | | Dennis Nutt | |
| Stephen F. Austin | Derek Allister | | Danny Kaspar | |
| Tennessee State | Frankie Allen | | Nolan Richardson III | Tennessee State hired the son of National championship coach Nolan Richardson. |
| Tulane | Perry Clark | | Shawn Finney | Tulane tapped Kentucky assistant Finney after losing Clark to Miami. |
| Tulsa | Bill Self | | Buzz Peterson | Tulsa tapped Appalachian State's Peterson after losing Self to Illinois. |
| Western Carolina | Phil Hopkins | | Steve Shurina | |
| Western Michigan | Bob Donewald | | Robert McCullum | |
| Wichita State | Randy Smithson | | Mark Turgeon | |
| William & Mary | Charlie Woollum | | Rick Boyages | Woollum retired after 25 seasons as a head coach. The Tribe hired Ohio State assistant Boyages. |

== Attendances ==
The top 10 NCAA Division I men's basketball teams by average home attendance in the 1999-2000 season:

| # | College basketball team | Average attendance |
|---|---|---|
| 1 | Kentucky | 22,448 |
| 2 | Syracuse | 20,807 |
| 3 | North Carolina | 20,163 |
| 4 | Louisville | 19,180 |
| 5 | Ohio State | 18,702 |
| 6 | Arkansas | 17,807 |
| 7 | NC State | 16,535 |
| 8 | New Mexico | 16,445 |
| 9 | Kansas | 16,271 |
| 10 | Indiana | 16,257 |
