= 1999–2000 Marquette Golden Eagles men's basketball team =

American college basketball season

1999–2000 Marquette Golden Eagles men's basketball

NIT, First Round
- Conference: Conference USA
- Record: 15–14 (8—8 CUSA)
- Head coach: Tom Crean (1st season)
- Assistant coaches: Tim Buckley; Darrin Horn; Dwayne Stephens
- Home arena: Bradley Center

1999–2000 Conference USA men's basketball standings
	Conf.				Overall
Team	W		L	PCT	W		L	PCT
American
No. 7 Cincinnati	16	–	0	1.000	29	–	4	.879
Louisville	10	–	6	.625	19	–	12	.613
DePaul	9	–	7	.563	21	–	12	.636
Marquette	8	–	8	.500	15	–	14	.517
Saint Louis †	7	–	9	.438	19	–	14	.576
Charlotte	7	–	9	.438	17	–	16	.515
National
Tulane	8	–	8	.500	20	–	11	.645
South Florida	8	–	8	.500	17	–	14	.548
Southern Miss	7	–	9	.438	17	–	12	.586
UAB	7	–	9	.438	14	–	14	.500
Memphis	7	–	9	.438	15	–	16	.484
Houston	2	–	14	.125	9	–	22	.290
† 2000 Conference USA Tournament winner Rankings from AP Poll

The 1999–2000 Marquette Golden Eagles men's basketball team represented the Marquette University in the 1999–2000 season. Their head coach was Tom Crean. The Golden Eagles finished the regular season with a record of 15–14, 8–8.

== Roster ==
1999–2000 Marquette Warriors men's basketball team
Players
Coaches

Pos.	#	Name	Height	Weight	Year	Hometown
G	10	Cordell Henry	5 ft 10 in (1.78 m)	160 lb (73 kg)	So	Chicago, Illinois
F	32	Bart Miller	6 ft 5 in (1.96 m)	205 lb (93 kg)	Sr	Brandenburg, Kentucky
C	35	John Mueller	6 ft 11 in (2.11 m)	232 lb (105 kg)	Jr	Cedarburg, Wisconsin
G	22	Brian Wardle	6 ft 5 in (1.96 m)	212 lb (96 kg)	Jr	Clarendon Hills, Illinois

Head coach

- Tom Crean

Assistant coach(es)

- Tim Buckley
- Darrin Horn
- Dwayne Stephens

Legend

- (C) Team captain
- (S) Suspended
- (I) Ineligible
- (W) Walk-on
- Injured
- Current redshirt

Roster

== Schedule ==
Date time, TV	Rank^{#}	Opponent^{#}	Result	Record	Site city, state
November 20*		Chicago State	W 62–43	1–0	Bradley Center; Milwaukee, WI
November 23		at Minnesota	L 57–66	1–1	Williams Arena; Minneapolis, MN
November 27*		Wofford	W 74–59	2–1	Bradley Center; Milwaukee, WI
December 3*		Western Michigan	W 76–69	3–1	Bradley Center; Milwaukee, WI
December 4*		Appalachian State	W 57–51	4–1	Bradley Center; Milwaukee, WI
December 7*		Dayton	L 60–63	4–2	Bradley Center; Milwaukee, WI
December 11*		at Baylor	L 68–72 ^{OT}	4–3	Ferrell Center; Waco, Texas
December 20*		Hampton	W 67–52	5–3	Bradley Center; Milwaukee, WI
December 23*		at Wisconsin	L 74–86	5–4	Kohl Center; Madison, WI
December 29*		Coppin State	W 63–55	6–4	Bradley Center; Milwaukee, WI
January 2*		Xavier	W 65–63	7–4	Bradley Center; Milwaukee, WI
January 5		Saint Louis	W 56–38	8–4 (1–0)	Bradley Center; Milwaukee, WI
January 8		at Cincinnati	L 48–67	8–5 (1–1)	Fifth Third Arena; Cincinnati, Ohio
January 12		at DePaul	W 69–60	9–5 (2–1)	Allstate Arena; Rosemont, Illinois
January 15		Louisville	W 66–64 ^{OT}	10–5 (3–1)	Bradley Center; Milwaukee, WI
January 19		Charlotte	W 65–55	11–5 (4–1)	Bradley Center; Milwaukee, WI
January 23		Cincinnati	L 60–72	11–6 (4–2)	Bradley Center; Milwaukee, WI
January 26		at St. Louis	L 52–67	11–7 (4–3)	Scottrade Center; St. Louis, Missouri
January 29		at Charlotte	L 54–60	11–8 (4–4)	Dale F. Halton Arena; Charlotte, NC
February 2		at Southern Mississippi	W 79–67	12–8 (5–4)	Reed Green Coliseum; Hattiesburg, Mississippi
February 5		Houston	W 65–61	13–8 (6–4)	Bradley Center; Milwaukee, WI
February 13		at Louisville	L 64–76	13–9 (6–5)	Freedom Hall; Louisville, Kentucky
February 16		DePaul	L 35–55	13–10 (6–6)	Bradley Center; Milwaukee, WI
February 24		at South Florida	W 61–60	14–10 (7–6)	Sun Dome; Tampa, Florida
February 26		Memphis	L 49–53	14–11 (7–7)	Bradley Center; Milwaukee, WI
March 1		UAB	W 68–58	15–11 (8–7)	Bradley Center; Milwaukee, WI
March 4		at Tulane	L 68–73	15–12 (8–8)	Avron B. Fogelman Arena; New Orleans, Louisiana
Conference USA tournament
March 8		vs. Houston	L 75–77	15–13 (8–9)	The Pyramid; Memphis, Tennessee
NIT
March 15*		at Xavier	L 63–67	15–14 (8–9)	Cincinnati Gardens; Cincinnati, Ohio
*Non-conference game. ^{#}Rankings from AP Poll. (#) Tournament seedings in parentheses.
