= 2000 Conference USA men's basketball tournament =

- Classification: Division I
- Season: 1999–00
- Teams: 12
- Site: The Pyramid; Memphis, TN
- Champions: Saint Louis (1st title)
- Winning coach: Lorenzo Romar (1st title)
- MVP: Justin Love (Saint Louis)

1999–2000 Conference USA men's basketball standings
| | Conf. | | | | Overall |
| Team | W | | L | PCT | W | | L | PCT |
|---|---|---|---|---|---|---|---|---|
American
| No. 7 Cincinnati | 16 | – | 0 | 1.000 | 29 | – | 4 | .879 |
| Louisville | 10 | – | 6 | .625 | 19 | – | 12 | .613 |
| DePaul | 9 | – | 7 | .563 | 21 | – | 12 | .636 |
| Marquette | 8 | – | 8 | .500 | 15 | – | 14 | .517 |
| Saint Louis † | 7 | – | 9 | .438 | 19 | – | 14 | .576 |
| Charlotte | 7 | – | 9 | .438 | 17 | – | 16 | .515 |
National
| Tulane | 8 | – | 8 | .500 | 20 | – | 11 | .645 |
| South Florida | 8 | – | 8 | .500 | 17 | – | 14 | .548 |
| Southern Miss | 7 | – | 9 | .438 | 17 | – | 12 | .586 |
| UAB | 7 | – | 9 | .438 | 14 | – | 14 | .500 |
| Memphis | 7 | – | 9 | .438 | 15 | – | 16 | .484 |
| Houston | 2 | – | 14 | .125 | 9 | – | 22 | .290 |
† 2000 Conference USA Tournament winner Rankings from AP Poll

The 2000 Conference USA men's basketball tournament was held March 8–11 at The Pyramid in Memphis, Tennessee.

Saint Louis upset DePaul in the championship game, 56–49, to clinch their first Conference USA men's tournament championship.

The Billikens, in turn, received an automatic bid to the 2000 NCAA tournament. They were joined in the tournament by fellow C-USA members Cincinnati, DePaul, and Louisville, who all earned at-large bids.

== Format ==
There were no new changes to the tournament format. The top four teams were given byes into the quarterfinal round while the remaining eight teams were placed into the first round. All seeds were determined by overall regular season conference records.

== Bracket ==
First round Wednesday, March 8
9 | Saint Louis | 59
8 | Southern Miss | 51
5 | Marquette | 75
12 | Houston | 77
11 | Memphis | 60
6 | South Florida | 58
7 | UNC Charlotte | 76
10 | UAB | 73

Quarterfinals; Thursday, March 9
1 | #1 Cincinnati | 58
9 | Saint Louis | 68
12 | Houston | 69
4 | Tulane | 76
3 | DePaul | 80
11 | Memphis | 76
7 | UNC Charlotte | 57
2 | Louisville | 52

Semifinals; Friday, March 10
9 | Saint Louis | 64
4 | Tulane | 46
3 | DePaul | 56
7 | UNC Charlotte | 49

Championship; Saturday, March 11
9 | Saint Louis | 56
3 | DePaul | 49
