= 1999–2000 Cincinnati Bearcats men's basketball team =

American college basketball season

1999–00 Cincinnati Bearcats men's basketball

Conference USA regular season champions

NCAA tournament, second round
- Conference: Conference USA

Ranking
- Coaches: No. 7
- AP: No. 7
- Record: 29–4 (16–0 C-USA)
- Head coach: Bob Huggins (11th season)
- Assistant coach: Mick Cronin (4th season)
- Home arena: Myrl Shoemaker Center

1999–2000 Conference USA men's basketball standings
	Conf.				Overall
Team	W		L	PCT	W		L	PCT
American
No. 7 Cincinnati	16	–	0	1.000	29	–	4	.879
Louisville	10	–	6	.625	19	–	12	.613
DePaul	9	–	7	.563	21	–	12	.636
Marquette	8	–	8	.500	15	–	14	.517
Saint Louis †	7	–	9	.438	19	–	14	.576
Charlotte	7	–	9	.438	17	–	16	.515
National
Tulane	8	–	8	.500	20	–	11	.645
South Florida	8	–	8	.500	17	–	14	.548
Southern Miss	7	–	9	.438	17	–	12	.586
UAB	7	–	9	.438	14	–	14	.500
Memphis	7	–	9	.438	15	–	16	.484
Houston	2	–	14	.125	9	–	22	.290
† 2000 Conference USA Tournament winner Rankings from AP Poll

The 1999–00 Cincinnati Bearcats men's basketball team represented University of Cincinnati as a member of Conference USA during the 1999–2000 NCAA Division I men's basketball season. The head coach was Bob Huggins, serving in his 11th year at the school. The team held the #1 ranking in the AP poll for 12 weeks during the season, but had their national championship hopes undermined when Naismith Player of the Year Kenyon Martin broke his leg during the Conference USA tournament. The Bearcats finished with a 29–4 record (16–0 C-USA).

== Roster ==
1999–2000 Cincinnati Bearcats men's basketball team
Players
Coaches

Pos.	#	Name	Height	Weight	Year	Hometown
G/F	3	DerMarr Johnson	6 ft 9 in (2.06 m)	210 lb (95 kg)	Fr	Washington, D.C.
C	4	Kenyon Martin	6 ft 9 in (2.06 m)	230 lb (104 kg)	Sr	Saginaw, Michigan
F	5	Jermaine Tate	6 ft 9 in (2.06 m)	235 lb (107 kg)	Sr	Toledo, Ohio
G	11	Kenny Satterfield	6 ft 2 in (1.88 m)	175 lb (79 kg)	Fr	New York City, New York
G	13	Leonard Stokes	6 ft 6 in (1.98 m)	200 lb (91 kg)	Fr	Buffalo, New York
G	14	David Dissinger	6 ft 4 in (1.93 m)	185 lb (84 kg)	Jr	Cincinnati, Ohio
G	22	Brad Ruppel	5 ft 8 in (1.73 m)	195 lb (88 kg)		Jackson, Missouri
F	24	Ryan Fletcher	6 ft 9 in (2.06 m)	245 lb (111 kg)	Sr	Franklin, Ohio
F	32	Pete Mickeal	6 ft 6.5 in (1.99 m)	230 lb (104 kg)	Sr	Rock Island, Illinois
G	34	Chris Taflinger	6 ft 2 in (1.88 m)	180 lb (82 kg)	Fr	Lima, Ohio
C	44	B. J. Grove	6 ft 11 in (2.11 m)	255 lb (116 kg)	Fr	Cincinnati, Ohio
G	42	Steven London	6 ft 1 in (1.85 m)	180 lb (82 kg)	Jr	Louisville, KY
C	50	Donald Little	6 ft 10 in (2.08 m)	215 lb (98 kg)	Fr	Augusta, Georgia

Head coach

Bob Huggins

Assistant coach(es)

- Mick Cronin

Legend

- (C) Team captain
- (S) Suspended
- (I) Ineligible
- (W) Walk-on
- Injured
- Current redshirt

== Schedule and results ==
Date time, TV	Rank^{#}	Opponent^{#}	Result	Record	Site city, state
Regular Season
Nov 20, 1999*	No. 1	Youngstown State	W 94–67	1–0	Myrl Shoemaker Center (13,176); Cincinnati, OH
Nov 26, 1999*; Fox Sports Net Ohio	No. 1	vs. Cleveland State; Big Island Invitational	W 91–56	2–0	Afook-Chinen Civic Auditorium (1,003); Hilo, HI
Nov 27, 1999*; Fox Sports Net Ohio	No. 1	vs. Santa Clara; Big Island Invitational	W 88–67	3–0	Afook-Chinen Civic Auditorium (1,200); Hilo, HI
Nov 28, 1999*; Fox Sports Net Ohio	No. 1	vs. Iowa State; Big Island Invitational	W 75–60	4–0	Afook-Chinen Civic Auditorium (2,500); Hilo, HI
Dec 4, 1999*; ESPN Plus	No. 1	vs. No. 25 Gonzaga; Rock-N-Roll Shootout	W 75–68	5–0	Gund Arena (11,132); Cleveland, OH
Dec 8, 1999*; ESPN	No. 1	vs. No. 7 North Carolina; Great Eight	W 77–68	6–0	United Center (13,463); Chicago, IL
Dec 11, 1999*	No. 1	Mississippi Valley State	W 74–48	7–0	Myrl Shoemaker Center (13,176); Cincinnati, OH
Dec 16, 1999; ESPN	No. 1	at Saint Louis	W 79–64	8–0 (1–0)	Scottrade Center (15,103); St. Louis, MO
Dec 18, 1999*; ESPN	No. 1	at Xavier; Crosstown Shootout	L 64–66	8–1	Cincinnati Gardens (10,100); Cincinnati, OH
Dec 22, 1999*; ESPN	No. 4	at No. 21 Oklahoma	W 72–57	9–1	Lloyd Noble Center (13,023); Norman, OK
Dec 27, 1999*; WXIX	No. 4	Milwaukee	W 93–60	10–1	Myrl Shoemaker Center (13,176); Cincinnati, OH
Dec 30, 1999*; WXIX	No. 3	at Boise State	W 78–46	11–1	Taco Bell Arena (11,518); Boise, ID
Jan 2, 2000*	No. 3	UNLV	W 106–66	12–1	Myrl Shoemaker Center (13,176); Cincinnati, OH
Jan 5, 2000; WXIX	No. 3	Charlotte	W 81–54	13–1 (2–0)	Myrl Shoemaker Center (13,176); Cincinnati, OH
Jan 8, 2000; WXIX	No. 3	Marquette	W 67–48	14–1 (3–0)	Myrl Shoemaker Center (13,176); Cincinnati, OH
Jan 12, 2000; WXIX	No. 1	at Tulane	W 72–59	15–1 (4–0)	New Orleans Arena (9,363); New Orleans, LA
Jan 14, 2000*; ESPN	No. 1	Ohio	W 73–59	16–1	Myrl Shoemaker Center (13,176); Cincinnati, OH
Jan 19, 2000	No. 1	Memphis	W 75–55	17–1 (5–0)	Myrl Shoemaker Center (13,176); Cincinnati, OH
Jan 23, 2000; ESPN2	No. 1	at Marquette	W 72–60	18–1 (6–0)	Bradley Center (14,123); Milwaukee, WI
Jan 27, 2000; ESPN	No. 1	at Louisville; Rivalry	W 75–65	19–1 (7–0)	Freedom Hall (19,886); Louisville, KY
Jan 29, 2000; ESPN Plus	No. 1	South Florida	W 89–72	20–1 (8–0)	Myrl Shoemaker Center (13,176); Cincinnati, OH
Feb 3, 2000; ESPN	No. 1	at Charlotte	W 70–62	21–1 (9–0)	Dale F. Halton Arena (9,105); Charlotte, NC
Feb 5, 2000; ESPN Plus	No. 1	at UAB	W 93–80	22–1 (10–0)	Bartow Arena (9,279); Birmingham, AL
Feb 13, 2000; ABC	No. 1	DePaul	W 87–64	23–1 (11–0)	Myrl Shoemaker Center (13,176); Cincinnati, OH
Feb 17, 2000; ESPN	No. 1	at Houston	W 77–65	24–1 (12–0)	Hofheinz Pavilion (8,917); Houston, TX
Feb 20, 2000*; ABC	No. 1	No. 15 Temple	L 69–77	24–2	Myrl Shoemaker Center (13,176); Cincinnati, OH
Feb 23, 2000; WXIX	No. 3	Southern Miss	W 95–69	25–2 (13–0)	Myrl Shoemaker Center (13,176); Cincinnati, OH
Feb 27, 2000; ESPN2	No. 3	Louisville; Rivalry	W 68–59	26–2 (14–0)	Myrl Shoemaker Center (13,176); Cincinnati, OH
Mar 2, 2000; ESPN	No. 2	at DePaul	W 64–62	27–2 (15–0)	Allstate Arena (18,253); Rosemont, IL
Mar 4, 2000; WXIX	No. 2	Saint Louis	W 84–41	28–2 (16–0)	Myrl Shoemaker Center (13,176); Cincinnati, OH
Conference USA Tournament
Mar 9, 2000*; ESPN Plus	(1) No. 1	vs. (9) Saint Louis; Conference USA Quarterfinal	L 58–68	28–3	The Pyramid (9,834); Memphis, TN
NCAA Tournament
Mar 17, 2000*	(2 S) No. 7	vs. (15 S) UNC Wilmington; First Round	W 64–47	29–3	Gaylord Entertainment Center (17,230); Nashville, TN
Mar 19, 2000*	(2 S) No. 7	vs. (7 S) No. 18 Tulsa; Second Round	L 61–69	29–4	Gaylord Entertainment Center (17,297); Nashville, TN
*Non-conference game. ^{#}Rankings from AP Poll. (#) Tournament seedings in parentheses. S=South.

== Rankings ==
Ranking movements Legend: ██ Increase in ranking ██ Decrease in ranking — = Not ranked
	Week																			
Poll	Pre	1	2	3	4	5	6	7	8	9	10	11	12	13	14	15	16	17	18	Final
AP	2	1	1	1	1	1	4	3	3	1	1	1	1	1	1	3	2	1	7	Not released
Coaches	3	—	1	1	1	1	4	3	3	1	1	1	1	1	1	3	2	1	6	7

^Coaches did not release a Week 1 poll.
*AP did not release post-NCAA Tournament rankings

== Awards and honors ==
- Kenyon Martin, Adolph Rupp Trophy
- Kenyon Martin, Naismith College Player of the Year
- Kenyon Martin, USBWA College Player of the Year
- Kenyon Martin, John R. Wooden Award
- Kenyon Martin, Associated Press College Basketball Player of the Year
- Kenyon Martin, State Farm Division I Player of the Year Award
- Bob Huggins, C-USA Coach of the Year

=== NBA draft selections ===
Year	Round	Pick	Overall	Player	NBA Club
2000	1	1	1	Kenyon Martin	New Jersey Nets
2000	1	6	6	DerMarr Johnson	Atlanta Hawks
