= 1999–2000 Louisville Cardinals men's basketball team =

American college basketball season

1999–2000 Louisville Cardinals men's basketball

NCAA tournament, Round of 64
- Conference: Conference USA
- Record: 19–12 (10–6 CUSA)
- Head coach: Denny Crum (29th season)
- Home arena: Freedom Hall

1999–2000 Conference USA men's basketball standings
	Conf.				Overall
Team	W		L	PCT	W		L	PCT
American
No. 7 Cincinnati	16	–	0	1.000	29	–	4	.879
Louisville	10	–	6	.625	19	–	12	.613
DePaul	9	–	7	.563	21	–	12	.636
Marquette	8	–	8	.500	15	–	14	.517
Saint Louis †	7	–	9	.438	19	–	14	.576
Charlotte	7	–	9	.438	17	–	16	.515
National
Tulane	8	–	8	.500	20	–	11	.645
South Florida	8	–	8	.500	17	–	14	.548
Southern Miss	7	–	9	.438	17	–	12	.586
UAB	7	–	9	.438	14	–	14	.500
Memphis	7	–	9	.438	15	–	16	.484
Houston	2	–	14	.125	9	–	22	.290
† 2000 Conference USA Tournament winner Rankings from AP Poll

The 1999–2000 Louisville Cardinals men's basketball team represented the University of Louisville in the 1999–2000 NCAA Division I men's basketball season. The head coach was Denny Crum and the team finished the season with an overall record of 19–12.

== Schedule ==
Date time, TV	Rank^{#}	Opponent^{#}	Result	Record	Site city, state
Regular Season
Nov 19, 1999*		at VCU	L 74–79	0–1	Siegel Center; Richmond, Virginia
Nov 25, 1999*		vs. Xavier; Great Alaska Shootout – First Round	L 79–81	0–2	Sullivan Arena; Anchorage, Alaska
Nov 26, 1999*		vs. Georgia; Great Alaska Shootout – Consolation Round	W 85–62	1–2	Sullivan Arena; Anchorage, Alaska
Nov 27, 1999*		at Alaska Anchorage; Great Alaska Shootout – 5th Place Game	W 108–76	2–2	Sullivan Arena; Anchorage, Alaska
Dec 4, 1999*		Louisiana Tech	W 78–67	3–2	Freedom Hall; Louisville, Kentucky
Dec 11, 1999*		Alabama	W 87–72	4–2	Freedom Hall; Louisville, Kentucky
Dec 15, 1999*		Central Florida	W 78–58	5–2	Freedom Hall; Louisville, Kentucky
Dec 18, 1999*		at Kentucky	L 46–76	5–3	Rupp Arena; Lexington, Kentucky
Dec 20, 1999*		Tennessee State	W 115–76	6–3	Freedom Hall; Louisville, Kentucky
Dec 23, 1999*		No. 6 North Carolina	W 97–80	7–3	Freedom Hall; Louisville, Kentucky
Jan 3, 2000		Tulane	W 81–70	8–3 (1–0)	Freedom Hall; Louisville, Kentucky
Jan 6, 2000*		No. 18 Utah	W 75–55	9–3	Freedom Hall; Louisville, Kentucky
Jan 8, 2000		Southern Miss	W 69–67	10–3 (2–0)	Freedom Hall; Louisville, Kentucky
Jan 12, 2000	No. 25	at UAB	L 50–56	10–4 (2–1)	Bartow Arena; Birmingham, Alabama
Jan 15, 2000	No. 25	at Marquette	L 64–66 ^{OT}	10–5 (2–2)	Bradley Center; Milwaukee, Wisconsin
Jan 20, 2000		No. 23 DePaul	W 72–59	11–5 (3–2)	Freedom Hall; Louisville, Kentucky
Jan 22, 2000		Charlotte	L 59–69	11–6 (3–3)	Freedom Hall; Louisville, Kentucky
Jan 27, 2000		No. 1 Cincinnati	L 65–75	11–7 (3–4)	Freedom Hall; Louisville, Kentucky
Jan 29, 2000		at Saint Louis	L 48–52	11–8 (3–5)	Kiel Center; St. Louis, Missouri
Feb 1, 2000*		at Georgetown	L 59–61	11–9	MCI Center; Washington D.C.
Feb 5, 2000		at Memphis	W 74–59	12–9 (4–5)	The Pyramid; Memphis, Tennessee
Feb 10, 2000*		No. 4 Syracuse	W 82–69	13–9	Freedom Hall; Louisville, Kentucky
Feb 13, 2000		Marquette	W 76–64	14–9 (5–5)	Freedom Hall; Louisville, Kentucky
Feb 16, 2000		at Charlotte	W 67–51	15–9 (6–5)	Halton Arena; Charlotte, North Carolina
Feb 19, 2000		at DePaul	W 71–54	16–9 (7–5)	Allstate Arena; Rosemont, Illinois
Feb 23, 2000		Saint Louis	W 68–56	17–9 (8–5)	Freedom Hall; Louisville, Kentucky
Feb 27, 2000		at No. 3 Cincinnati	L 54–68	17–10 (8–6)	Shoemaker Center; Cincinnati, Ohio
Feb 29, 2000		South Florida	W 76–66	18–10 (9–6)	Freedom Hall; Louisville, Kentucky
Mar 4, 2000		at Houston	W 88–74	19–10 (10–6)	Hofheinz Pavilion; Houston, Texas
Conference USA Tournament
Mar 9, 2000*	(2)	vs. (7) Charlotte	L 52–57	19–11	The Pyramid; Memphis, Tennessee
NCAA Tournament
Mar 16, 2000	(7 W)	vs. (10 W) Gonzaga; First Round	L 66–77	19–12	McKale Center; Tucson, Arizona
*Non-conference game. ^{#}Rankings from AP Poll. (#) Tournament seedings in parentheses. W=West. All times are in Eastern Time.
