= 1999–2000 Gonzaga Bulldogs men's basketball team =

American college basketball season

1999–2000 Gonzaga Bulldogs men's basketball

WCC tournament champions

NCAA tournament, Sweet Sixteen
- Conference: West Coast Conference

Ranking
- Coaches: No. 24
- Record: 26–9 (11–3 WCC)
- Head coach: Mark Few (1st season)
- Assistant coaches: Bill Grier (9th season); Leon Rice (1st season)
- Home arena: Charlotte Y. Martin Centre

1999–2000 West Coast Conference men's basketball standings
	Conf.				Overall
Team	W		L	PCT	W		L	PCT
Pepperdine	12	–	2	.857	25	–	9	.735
Gonzaga †	11	–	3	.786	26	–	9	.743
San Diego	10	–	4	.714	20	–	9	.690
Santa Clara	9	–	5	.643	19	–	12	.613
San Francisco	7	–	7	.500	19	–	9	.679
Portland	4	–	10	.286	10	–	18	.357
Saint Mary's	3	–	11	.214	8	–	20	.286
Loyola Marymount	0	–	14	.000	2	–	26	.071
† 2000 WCC tournament winner Rankings from AP poll

The 1999-2000 Gonzaga men's basketball team represented Gonzaga University as a member of the West Coast Conference during the 1999–2000 NCAA Division I men's basketball season. They were led by first-year coach Mark Few and reached the Sweet Sixteen of the NCAA tournament.

== Roster ==
1999–2000 Gonzaga Bulldogs men's basketball team
Players
Coaches

Pos.	#	Name	Height	Weight	Year	Hometown
G	13	Matt Santangelo	6 ft 1 in (1.85 m)	173 lb (78 kg)	RS Sr	Portland, OR
G	15	Ryan Floyd	6 ft 1 in (1.85 m)	185 lb (84 kg)	RS Sr	Harrington, WA
G	25	Mike Nilson	6 ft 5 in (1.96 m)	216 lb (98 kg)	RS Sr	Seattle, WA
G	24	Richie Frahm	6 ft 5 in (1.96 m)	203 lb (92 kg)	Sr	Battle Ground, WA
F/C	30	Axel Dench	6 ft 11 in (2.11 m)	243 lb (110 kg)	Sr	Melbourne, Australia
F	23	Mark Spink	6 ft 8 in (2.03 m)	200 lb (91 kg)	RS Jr	Bellingham, WA
F	31	Casey Calvary	6 ft 8 in (2.03 m)	215 lb (98 kg)	Jr	Tacoma, WA
F	32	Zach Gourde	6 ft 8 in (2.03 m)	245 lb (111 kg)	So	Vancouver, WA
F	21	Damany Hendrix	6 ft 5 in (1.96 m)	215 lb (98 kg)	So	Vallejo, CA
C	33	Eric Chilton	7 ft 1 in (2.16 m)	245 lb (111 kg)	So	Kelso, WA

Head coach

- Mark Few (Oregon)

Assistant coach(es)

- Bill Grier (Oregon)
- Leon Rice (Washington State)

Legend

- (C) Team captain
- (S) Suspended
- (I) Ineligible
- (W) Walk-on
- Injured
- Current redshirt

Roster
Last update: March 28, 2019

== Schedule ==
Date time, TV	Rank^{#}	Opponent^{#}	Result	Record	Site city, state
Regular season
Nov 21, 1999*	No. 25	at Montana	W 76–61	1–0	Dahlberg Arena (6,561); Missoula, MT
Nov 26, 1999*	No. 25	Eastern Washington	W 81–47	2–0	The Kennel (4,004); Spokane, WA
Nov 29, 1999*	No. 25	vs. Washington State	W 73–63	3–0	Spokane Arena (11,048); Spokane, WA
Dec 1, 1999*	No. 25	Boise State	W 71–55	4–0	The Kennel (3,871); Spokane, WA
Dec 4, 1999*	No. 25	vs. No. 1 Cincinnati; Rock 'N' Roll Shootout	L 68–75	4–1	Gund Arena (11,392); Cleveland, OH
Dec 8, 1999*	No. 24	vs. No. 19 Temple; Great Eight	L 48–64	4–2	United Center (13,463); Chicago, IL
Dec 11, 1999*	No. 24	at No. 11 UCLA	W 59–43	5–2	Pauley Pavilion (9,951); Los Angeles, CA
Dec 13, 1999*	No. 24	at Washington	W 76–66	6–2	Bank of America Arena (8,637); Seattle, WA
Dec 19, 1999*	No. 22	Montana	W 88–70	7–2	The Kennel (4,088); Spokane, WA
Dec 21, 1999*	No. 22	vs. California; Pete Newell Challenge	L 64–72	7–3	Oakland Arena (9,174); Oakland, CA
Dec 28, 1999*		vs. Ohio; Outrigger Hotels Rainbow Classic	W 83–55	8–3	Stan Sheriff Center (8,004); Honolulu, HI
Dec 29, 1999*		vs. Oregon; Outrigger Hotels Rainbow Classic	L 64–70	8–4	Stan Sheriff Center (8,349); Honolulu, HI
Dec 30, 1999*		vs. Colorado; Outrigger Hotels Rainbow Classic	L 77–81	8–5	Stan Sheriff Center (8,645); Honolulu, HI
Jan 4, 2000*		Idaho	W 60–49	9–5	Cowan Spectrum (2,916); Moscow, ID
Jan 8, 2000*		Texas Pan-American	W 111–71	10–5	The Kennel (3,811); Spokane, WA
Jan 13, 2000		San Francisco	W 96–73	11–5 (1–0)	The Kennel (4,097); Spokane, WA
Jan 15, 2000		Santa Clara	W 97–67	12–5 (2–0)	The Kennel (4,097); Spokane, WA
Jan 20, 2000		at Saint Mary's	W 90–60	13–5 (3–0)	McKeon Pavilion (3,061); Moraga, CA
Jan 22, 2000		at San Diego	W 84–79 ^{OT}	14–5 (4–0)	USD Sports Center (2,500); San Diego, CA
Jan 26, 2000		Portland	W 84–66	15–5 (5–0)	The Kennel (4,018); Spokane, WA
Jan 29, 2000		at Portland	W 81–57	16–5 (6–0)	Chiles Center (4,890); Portland, OR
Feb 3, 2000		Pepperdine	W 62–57	17–5 (7–0)	The Kennel (4,062); Spokane, WA
Feb 5, 2000		Loyola Marymount	W 103–56	18–5 (8–0)	The Kennel (4,020); Spokane, WA
Feb 11, 2000		at Loyola Marymount	W 101–77	19–5 (9–0)	Gersten Pavilion (1,203); Los Angeles, CA
Feb 12, 2000		at Pepperdine	L 69–80	19–6 (9–1)	Firestone Fieldhouse (3,314); Malibu, CA
Feb 17, 2000		San Diego	L 70–82	19–7 (9–2)	The Kennel (3,912); Spokane, WA
Feb 19, 2000		Saint Mary's	W 93–66	20–7 (10–2)	The Kennel (4,093); Spokane, WA
Feb 25, 2000		at Santa Clara	L 70–81	20–8 (10–3)	Leavey Center (4,536); Santa Clara, CA
Feb 27, 2000		at San Francisco	W 70–64	21–8 (11–3)	War Memorial Gymnasium (5,304); San Francisco, CA
WCC Tournament
Mar 4, 2000*	(2)	vs. (7) Saint Mary's; Quarterfinals	W 76–49	22–8	Leavey Center (2,461); Santa Clara, CA
Mar 5, 2000*	(2)	vs. (5) San Diego; Semifinals	W 80–70	23–8	Leavey Center (NA); Santa Clara, CA
Mar 6, 2000*	(2)	vs. (1) Pepperdine; Championship	W 69–65 ^{OT}	24–8	Leavey Center (3,481); Santa Clara, CA
NCAA tournament
Mar 16, 2000*	(10 W)	vs. (7 W) Louisville; First Round	W 77–66	25–8	McKale Center (13,624); Tucson, AZ
Mar 18, 2000*	(10 W)	vs. (2 W) No. 9 St. John's; Second Round	W 82–76	26–8	McKale Center (13,818); Tucson, AZ
Mar 23, 2000*	(10 W)	vs. (6 W) No. 25 Purdue; Sweet Sixteen	L 66–75	26–9	The Pit (16,004); Albuquerque, NM
*Non-conference game. ^{#}Rankings from AP Poll. (#) Tournament seedings in parentheses. W=West Regional. All times are in Pacific time.
