= 2000 West Coast Conference men's basketball tournament =

- Classification: Division I
- Season: 1999–00
- Teams: 8
- Site: Toso Pavilion; Santa Clara, California
- Champions: Gonzaga (3rd title)
- Winning coach: Mark Few (1st title)
- MVP: Casey Calvary (Gonzaga)
- Television: ESPN2, ESPN

1999–2000 West Coast Conference men's basketball standings
	Conf.				Overall
Team	W		L	PCT	W		L	PCT
Pepperdine	12	–	2	.857	25	–	9	.735
Gonzaga †	11	–	3	.786	26	–	9	.743
San Diego	10	–	4	.714	20	–	9	.690
Santa Clara	9	–	5	.643	19	–	12	.613
San Francisco	7	–	7	.500	19	–	9	.679
Portland	4	–	10	.286	10	–	18	.357
Saint Mary's	3	–	11	.214	8	–	20	.286
Loyola Marymount	0	–	14	.000	2	–	26	.071
† 2000 WCC tournament winner Rankings from AP poll

The 2000 West Coast Conference men's basketball tournament took place March 4–6, 2000. All rounds were held in Santa Clara, California at the Toso Pavilion. The semifinals were televised by ESPN2. The West Coast Conference Championship Game was televised by ESPN.

The Gonzaga Bulldogs earned their second straight WCC Tournament title and an automatic bid to the 2000 NCAA tournament. Casey Calvary of Gonzaga was named Tournament MVP.

== Format ==
With eight teams participating, all eight teams were placed into the first round, with teams seeded and paired based on regular-season records. After the first round, teams were re-seeded so the highest-remaining team was paired with the lowest-remaining time in one semifinal with the other two teams slotted into the other semifinal.

== Bracket ==
* – Denotes overtime period

Quarter finals Saturday, March 4
1	Pepperdine	83
8	Loyola Marymount	49
4	Santa Clara	63
5	San Francisco	48
(Pairings are reseeded after the first round)
3	San Diego	56
6	Portland	52
2	Gonzaga	76
7	Saint Mary's	49

Semi-finals; Sunday, March 5
1	Pepperdine	58
6	Santa Clara	55
2	Gonzaga	80
5	San Diego	70

Finals; Monday, March 6
1	Pepperdine	65
2	Gonzaga	69*

== See also ==
- West Coast Conference
