= 1999–2000 Louisiana–Lafayette Ragin' Cajuns men's basketball team =

American college basketball season

1999–2000 Louisiana–Lafayette Ragin' Cajuns men's basketball

Sun Belt tournament champions

NCAA tournament
- Conference: Sun Belt Conference
- Record: 25–8 (13–3 Sun Belt)
- Head coach: Jessie Evans (3rd season)
- Home arena: Cajundome

1999–2000 Sun Belt Conference men's basketball standings
	Conf.				Overall
Team	W		L	PCT	W		L	PCT
South Alabama	13	–	3	.813	20	–	10	.667
Louisiana–Lafayette †	13	–	3	.813	25	–	9	.735
Louisiana Tech	12	–	4	.750	21	–	8	.724
Florida International	9	–	7	.563	16	–	14	.533
Western Kentucky	8	–	8	.500	11	–	18	.379
Arkansas State	7	–	9	.438	10	–	18	.357
New Orleans	6	–	10	.375	11	–	18	.379
Denver	3	–	13	.188	6	–	22	.214
Arkansas-Little Rock	1	–	15	.063	4	–	24	.143
† 2000 Sun Belt Conference tournament winner Rankings from AP Poll

The 1999–2000 Louisiana–Lafayette Ragin' Cajuns men's basketball team represented the University of Louisiana at Lafayette during the 1999–2000 NCAA Division I men's basketball season. The Ragin' Cajuns, led by third-year head coach Jessie Evans, played their home games at the Cajundome and were members of the Sun Belt Conference. They finished the season 25–9, 13–3 in Sun Belt play to finish in second place. They were champions of the Sun Belt Conference tournament to earn an automatic bid to the NCAA tournament where they lost in the first round to Tennessee.

== Roster ==
1999–2000 Louisiana Ragin' Cajuns men's basketball team
Players	Coaches
Pos. / # / Name / Height / Weight / Year / Hometown; G / / Orlando Butler / 6 ft 2 in (1.88 m) / — / Jr	Head coach: Jessie Evans; Assistant coach(es) Legend: (C) Team captain; (S) Suspended; (I) Ineligible; (W) Walk-on; Injured; Current redshirt

== Schedule and results ==
Date time, TV	Rank^{#}	Opponent^{#}	Result	Record	Site (attendance) city, state
Regular season
Nov 20, 1999*		at No. 21 Texas	L 48–82	0–1	Frank Erwin Center; Austin, Texas
Nov 27, 1999*		East Carolina	W 70–64	1–1	Cajundome; Lafayette, Louisiana
Nov 30, 1999		at Denver	W 81–68	2–1 (1–0)	Magness Arena; Denver, Colorado
Dec 4, 1999*		at Texas Tech	L 54–67	2–2	United Spirit Arena; Lubbock, Texas
Dec 6, 1999*		at North Texas	W 74–59	3–2	Super Pit; Denton, Texas
Dec 11, 1999*		Southern Miss	L 47–65	3–3	Cajundome; Lafayette, Louisiana
Dec 14, 1999*		Lamar	W 81–79	4–3	Cajundome; Lafayette, Louisiana
Dec 16, 1999*		at McNeese State	W 74–61	5–3	Burton Coliseum; Lake Charles, Louisiana
Dec 20, 1999*		vs. Miami (FL); San Juan Shootout	W 66–60	6–3	Rafael A. Mangual Coliseum; Mayagüez, Puerto Rico
Dec 21, 1999*		vs. Pepperdine; San Juan Shootout	L 53–99	6–4	Rafael A. Mangual Coliseum; Mayagüez, Puerto Rico
Dec 22, 1999*		vs. Virginia Tech; San Juan Shootout	L 56–59	6–5	Rafael A. Mangual Coliseum; Mayagüez, Puerto Rico
Dec 28, 1999		Texas A&M	W 85–77	7–5 (1–0)	Cajundome; Lafayette, Louisiana
Jan 2, 2000*		Siena	W 71–54	8–5	Cajundome; Lafayette, Louisiana
Jan 6, 2000		Denver	W 76–60	9–5 (2–0)	Cajundome; Lafayette, Louisiana
Jan 10, 2000*		at Texas–Pan American	W 84–71	10–5	UTPA Fieldhouse; Edinburg, Texas
Jan 15, 2000		Louisiana Tech	W 84–72	11–5 (3–0)	Cajundome; Lafayette, Louisiana
Jan 17, 2000*		Texas–Pan American	W 101–88	12–5	Cajundome; Lafayette, Louisiana
Jan 20, 2000		Arkansas State	W 87–73	13–5 (4–0)	Cajundome; Lafayette, Louisiana
Jan 22, 2000		Arkansas–Little Rock	W 89–75	14–5 (5–0)	Cajundome; Lafayette, Louisiana
Jan 27, 2000		at Florida International	W 64–60	15–5 (6–0)	U.S. Century Bank Arena; Miami, Florida
Jan 29, 2000		at Western Kentucky	W 86–77	16–5 (7–0)	E.A. Diddle Arena; Bowling Green, Kentucky
Feb 3, 2000		South Alabama	L 65–69	16–6 (7–1)	Cajundome; Lafayette, Louisiana
Feb 5, 2000		New Orleans	W 66–58	17–6 (8–1)	Cajundome; Lafayette, Louisiana
Feb 10, 2000		at Arkansas–Little Rock	W 88–62	18–6 (9–1)	Alltel Arena; Little Rock, Arkansas
Feb 12, 2000		at Arkansas State	W 79–75	19–6 (10–1)	Convocation Center; Jonesboro, Arkansas
Feb 17, 2000		Western Kentucky	W 72–64	20–6 (11–1)	Cajundome; Lafayette, Louisiana
Feb 19, 2000		Florida International	W 75–69	21–6 (12–1)	Cajundome; Lafayette, Louisiana
Feb 21, 2000		at Louisiana Tech	L 75–80	21–7 (12–2)	Thomas Assembly Center; Ruston, Louisiana
Feb 24, 2000		at South Alabama	L 58–71	21–8 (12–3)	Mitchell Center; Mobile, Alabama
Feb 26, 2000		at New Orleans	W 93–77	22–8 (13–3)	Lakefront Arena; New Orleans, Louisiana
Sun Belt tournament
Mar 5, 2000*		vs. New Orleans; Quarterfinals	W 55–35	23–8	Alltel Arena; North Little Rock, Arkansas
Mar 6, 2000*		vs. Louisiana Tech; Semifinals	W 73–58	24–8	Alltel Arena; North Little Rock, Arkansas
Mar 7, 2000*		vs. South Alabama; Championship game	W 51–50	25–8	Alltel Arena; North Little Rock, Arkansas
NCAA tournament
Mar 17, 2000*	(13 S)	vs. (4 S) No. 11 Tennessee; First Round	L 58–63	25–9	Birmingham-Jefferson Civic Center; Birmingham, Alabama
*Non-conference game. ^{#}Rankings from AP Poll. (#) Tournament seedings in parentheses. S=South. All times are in Central Time.
