= 2000 Sun Belt Conference men's basketball tournament =

Men's basketball tournament held in the year 2000

- Classification: Division I
- Season: 1999–00
- Teams: 9
- Site: Alltel Arena; North Little Rock, AR
- Champions: Louisiana–Lafayette (3rd title)
- Winning coach: Jessie Evans (1st title)
- MVP: Virgil Stanescu (South Alabama)

1999–2000 Sun Belt Conference men's basketball standings
	Conf.				Overall
Team	W		L	PCT	W		L	PCT
South Alabama	13	–	3	.813	20	–	10	.667
Louisiana–Lafayette †	13	–	3	.813	25	–	9	.735
Louisiana Tech	12	–	4	.750	21	–	8	.724
Florida International	9	–	7	.563	16	–	14	.533
Western Kentucky	8	–	8	.500	11	–	18	.379
Arkansas State	7	–	9	.438	10	–	18	.357
New Orleans	6	–	10	.375	11	–	18	.379
Denver	3	–	13	.188	6	–	22	.214
Arkansas-Little Rock	1	–	15	.063	4	–	24	.143
† 2000 Sun Belt Conference tournament winner Rankings from AP Poll

The 2000 Sun Belt Conference men's basketball tournament was held March 4–7 at Alltel Arena in North Little Rock, Arkansas.

Louisiana–Lafayette defeated top-seeded South Alabama in the championship game, 51–50, to win their third Sun Belt men's basketball tournament.

The Ragin' Cajuns, in turn, received an automatic bid to the 2000 NCAA tournament. No other Sun Belt members earned bids to the tournament.

== Format ==
The Sun Belt added one team, Denver, in the offseason, bringing total membership up to nine.

The tournament field also expanded, adding a preliminary first round for two of the lowest seeded teams in the conference. With all nine Sun Belt teams seeded based on regular season conference records, the ninth-seeded team, rather than entering the play-in game, was paired with the tournament's top seed directly in the quarterfinals. Instead, the seventh- and eighth-seeded teams contested the play-in game, with a chance to play the second-seeded team in the ensuing quarterfinal round.

== Bracket ==
First round Saturday, March 4
7	New Orleans	67
8	Denver	65

Quarterfinals; Saturday, March 4 Sunday, March 5
1	South Alabama	74
9	Arkansas–Little Rock	58
5	Western Kentucky	79
4	Florida International	60
3	Louisiana Tech	84
6	Arkansas State	77
7	New Orleans	35
2	Louisiana–Lafayette	55

Semifinals; Monday, March 6
1	South Alabama	64
5	Western Kentucky	61
3	Louisiana Tech	58
2	Louisiana–Lafayette	73

Championship; Tuesday, March 7
1	South Alabama	50
2	Louisiana–Lafayette	51

== See also ==
- Sun Belt Conference women's basketball tournament
