= 1999–2000 Pepperdine Waves men's basketball team =

American college basketball season

1999–2000 Pepperdine Waves men's basketball

WCC regular season champions

NCAA tournament, second round
- Conference: West Coast Conference
- Record: 25–9 (12–2 WCC)
- Head coach: Jan van Breda Kolff (1st season)
- Home arena: Firestone Fieldhouse

1999–2000 West Coast Conference men's basketball standings
	Conf.				Overall
Team	W		L	PCT	W		L	PCT
Pepperdine	12	–	2	.857	25	–	9	.735
Gonzaga †	11	–	3	.786	26	–	9	.743
San Diego	10	–	4	.714	20	–	9	.690
Santa Clara	9	–	5	.643	19	–	12	.613
San Francisco	7	–	7	.500	19	–	9	.679
Portland	4	–	10	.286	10	–	18	.357
Saint Mary's	3	–	11	.214	8	–	20	.286
Loyola Marymount	0	–	14	.000	2	–	26	.071
† 2000 WCC tournament winner Rankings from AP poll

The 1999–2000 Pepperdine Waves men's basketball team represented Pepperdine University in the 1999–2000 NCAA Division I men's basketball season. The team was led by first-year head coach Jan van Breda Kolff. The Waves played their home games at the Firestone Fieldhouse and were members of the West Coast Conference. They finished the season 25–9, 12–2 in WCC play to win the regular season conference title. Pepperdine lost in the championship game of the West Coast Conference tournament, but did receive an at-large bid to the NCAA tournament as No. 11 seed in the East region. In the opening round, the Waves surprised No. 6 seed Indiana – in what would be head coach Bobby Knight’s final game at the school – before falling to Oklahoma State in the second round, 75–67.

== Roster ==
1999–2000 Pepperdine Waves men's basketball team
Players	Coaches
Pos. / # / Name / Height / Weight / Year / Previous school / Hometown; G / 3 / Brandon Armstrong / 6 ft 5 in (1.96 m) / 180 lb (82 kg) / Fr / Vallejo / Vallejo, California	Head coach: Jan van Breda Kolff; Assistant coach(es) Legend: (C) Team captain; (S) Suspended; (I) Ineligible; (W) Walk-on; Injured; Current redshirt

== Schedule and results ==
Date time, TV	Rank^{#}	Opponent^{#}	Result	Record	Site (attendance) city, state
Non-conference regular season
Nov 20, 1999*		Long Beach State	W 76–74	1–0	Firestone Fieldhouse; Malibu, California
Nov 23, 1999*		at Fresno State	W 70–68	2–0	Selland Arena; Fresno, California
Nov 27, 1999*		UNC Charlotte	L 74–80	2–1	Firestone Fieldhouse; Malibu, California
Nov 28, 1999*		Colorado State	W 67–57	3–1	Firestone Fieldhouse; Malibu, California
Dec 2, 1999*		at No. 6 Kansas	L 61–76	3–2	Allen Fieldhouse; Lawrence, Kansas
Dec 4, 1999*		at Wichita State	W 74–69	4–2	Levitt Arena; Wichita, Kansas
Dec 7, 1999*		Cal State Fullerton	W 96–63	5–2	Firestone Fieldhouse; Malibu, California
Dec 11, 1999*		at UC Santa Barbara	W 68–64	6–2	The Thunderdome; Santa Barbara, California
Dec 20, 1999*		vs. Detroit; San Juan Shootout	W 73–51	7–2	Rafael A. Mangual Coliseum; Mayagüez, Puerto Rico
Dec 21, 1999*		vs. Louisiana–Lafayette; San Juan Shootout	W 99–53	8–2	Rafael A. Mangual Coliseum; Mayagüez, Puerto Rico
Dec 22, 1999*		vs. No. 7 Auburn; San Juan Shootout	L 76–87	8–3	Rafael A. Mangual Coliseum; Mayagüez, Puerto Rico
Dec 28, 1999*		at No. 23 UCLA	L 66–68	8–4	Pauley Pavilion; Los Angeles, California
Dec 30, 1999*		Pacific	L 58–64	8–5	Firestone Fieldhouse; Malibu, California
Jan 3, 2000*		Lehigh	W 83–38	9–5	Firestone Fieldhouse; Malibu, California
Jan 8, 2000*		at Northwestern	W 57–56	10–5	Welsh-Ryan Arena; Evanston, Illinois
WCC Regular Season
Jan 14, 2000		Saint Mary's	W 77–49	11–5 (1–0)	Firestone Fieldhouse; Malibu, California
Jan 15, 2000		San Diego	W 76–68	12–5 (2–0)	Firestone Fieldhouse; Malibu, California
Jan 21, 2000		at Santa Clara	W 71–60	13–5 (3–0)	Leavey Center; Santa Clara, California
Jan 22, 2000		at San Francisco	W 76–70	14–5 (4–0)	War Memorial Gymnasium; San Francisco, California
Jan 28, 2000		San Francisco	W 69–58	15–5 (5–0)	Firestone Fieldhouse; Malibu, California
Jan 29, 2000		Santa Clara	W 67–59	16–5 (6–0)	Firestone Fieldhouse; Malibu, California
Feb 3, 2000		at Gonzaga	L 57–62	16–6 (6–1)	The Kennel; Spokane, Washington
Feb 5, 2000		at Portland	W 75–68	17–6 (7–1)	Chiles Center; Portland, Oregon
Feb 11, 2000		Portland	W 80–60	18–6 (8–1)	Firestone Fieldhouse; Malibu, California
Feb 12, 2000		Gonzaga	W 80–69	19–6 (9–1)	Firestone Fieldhouse; Malibu, California
Feb 16, 2000		Loyola Marymount	W 95–73	20–6 (10–1)	Firestone Fieldhouse; Malibu, California
Feb 19, 2000		at Loyola Marymount	W 77–65	21–6 (11–1)	Gersten Pavilion; Los Angeles, California
Feb 24, 2000		at San Diego	L 62–73	21–7 (11–2)	USD Sports Center; San Diego, California
Feb 26, 2000		Saint Mary's	W 71–42	22–7 (12–2)	Firestone Fieldhouse; Malibu, California
WCC tournament
Mar 4, 2000*	(1)	vs. (8) Loyola Marymount; Quarterfinals	W 83–49	23–7	Leavey Center; Santa Clara, California
Mar 5, 2000*	(1)	at (6) Santa Clara; Semifinals	W 58–55	24–7	Leavey Center; Santa Clara, California
Mar 6, 2000*	(1)	vs. (2) Gonzaga; Championship Game	L 65–69 ^{OT}	24–8	Leavey Center; Santa Clara, California
NCAA tournament
Mar 17, 2000*	(11 E)	vs. (6 E) No. 22 Indiana; First Round	W 77–57	25–8	HSBC Arena; Buffalo, New York
Mar 19, 2000*	(11 E)	vs. (3 E) No. 14 Oklahoma State; Second Round	L 67–75	25–9	HSBC Arena; Buffalo, New York
*Non-conference game. ^{#}Rankings from AP poll. (#) Tournament seedings in parentheses. E=East.
