= Justin Love =

American basketball player and coach (1978–2020)

Personal information
- Born: November 6, 1978 San Francisco, California
- Died: June 23, 2020 (aged 41) Mascoutah, Illinois
- Listed height: 6 ft 2 in (1.88 m)
- Listed weight: 210 lb (95 kg)

Career information
- High school: Washington (San Francisco, California); Sacred Heart Cathedral (San Francisco, California)
- College: Cañada College (1996–1998); Saint Louis (1998–2000)
- NBA draft: 2000: undrafted
- Playing career: 2000–2015
- Position: Guard

Career history
- 2000–2001: Kansas City Knights
- 2001: Gravelines
- 2002: St. Louis SkyHawks
- 2002–2004: Beijing Olympians
- 2004: St. Louis SkyHawks
- 2004–2005: BK Ventspils
- 2005–2006: Ludwigsburg
- 2006–2008: BK Ventspils
- 2008–2009: BC Odesa
- 2009–2011: MBC Mykolaiv
- 2011–2015: BC Odesa

Career highlights
- Latvian League champion (2005); Latvian League Finals MVP (2005); 2× Latvian League All-Star (2005, 2008); Baltic League All-Star (2007); Basketball Bundesliga All-Star (2006); Conference USA Tournament MVP (2000); First-team All-Conference USA (2000)

Justin Love (November 6, 1978 – June 23, 2020) was an American professional basketball player and coach.

== College career ==
Love was born in San Francisco and attended Washington High School and then Sacred Heart Cathedral High School, where he was MVP when the school won the West Catholic Athletic League Championship in 1995. He played collegiately at Cañada College, where he was a National Junior College All-American in 1998, and Saint Louis University, where he led the team to an NCAA Division I appearance and received a Conference USA First Team selection and Tournament MVP award in 2000. Love earned a bachelor's degree in Communication Disorders and a master's degree in Education at Saint Louis, and was inducted into the university's hall of fame in 2009. He was also inducted into the hall of fame at Sacred Heart Cathedral and in 2016 at Cañada College.

== Professional career ==
After graduation, Love went undrafted in the 2000 NBA draft, making him an unrestricted free agent. After participating in the Phoenix Suns' training camp, he signed a multi-year agreement with the team on August 1, 2000. On October 25, the Suns decided to waive him. Love went on to play for the Kansas City Knights, a newly-founded team that competed in the American Basketball Association's inaugural season.

In February 2001, he accepted BCM Gravelines-Dunkerque's offer to play in the LNB Pro A league, but was released a month later due to difficulties adapting to European basketball. He returned to St. Louis, briefly starring in the local St. Louis SkyHawks of the USBL before moving to China.

In 2002, Love signed with Beijing Olympians and played two seasons in the Chinese Basketball Association (CBA), locking in an Asia-Basket All-CBA Imports 2nd Team selection in 2004. After briefly returning to the St. Louis SkyHawks, he moved to Latvia, signing with BK Ventspils. Over the next four seasons, he carved out a solid leadership role within his teams, consistently posting double digit scoring averages and maintaining a high three-point shooting percentage (40%). Despite his 1.88m (6ft 2in) stature, his remarkable rebounding skills yielded nearly a rebound every seven minutes of playing time in the ULEB Cup. He was Latvian League Player of the Year in the 2004–05 season.

He spent the last six years of his professional career in Ukraine, signing with MBC Mykolaiv for two seasons in 2009 and then with BC Odesa for another four seasons. He continued to show impressive consistency, even with age, averaging double figures in scoring, solid outside shooting percentages and rebounding averages until his last season (2014-15). He was all-time leading scorer in the Ukrainian Superleague.

== Coaching career ==
After retiring as a player, Love became an assistant coach at Belleville High School-West in Illinois, and in 2017 boys' basketball head coach at Mascoutah High School. In his three years with the Indians, he coached the team to a 55-42 record, winning the IHSA Class 3A regional championship in 2019, and was subsequently named the Illinois Basketball Association's boys Coach of the Year.

== Personal life and death ==
Love married Katy Walter in 2006; they had three children.

On June 23, 2020, Love was found unresponsive on the grounds of Mascoutah High School. He was pronounced dead at a local hospital.
