= 1999–2000 DePaul Blue Demons men's basketball team =

American college basketball season

1999–2000 DePaul Blue Demons men's basketball
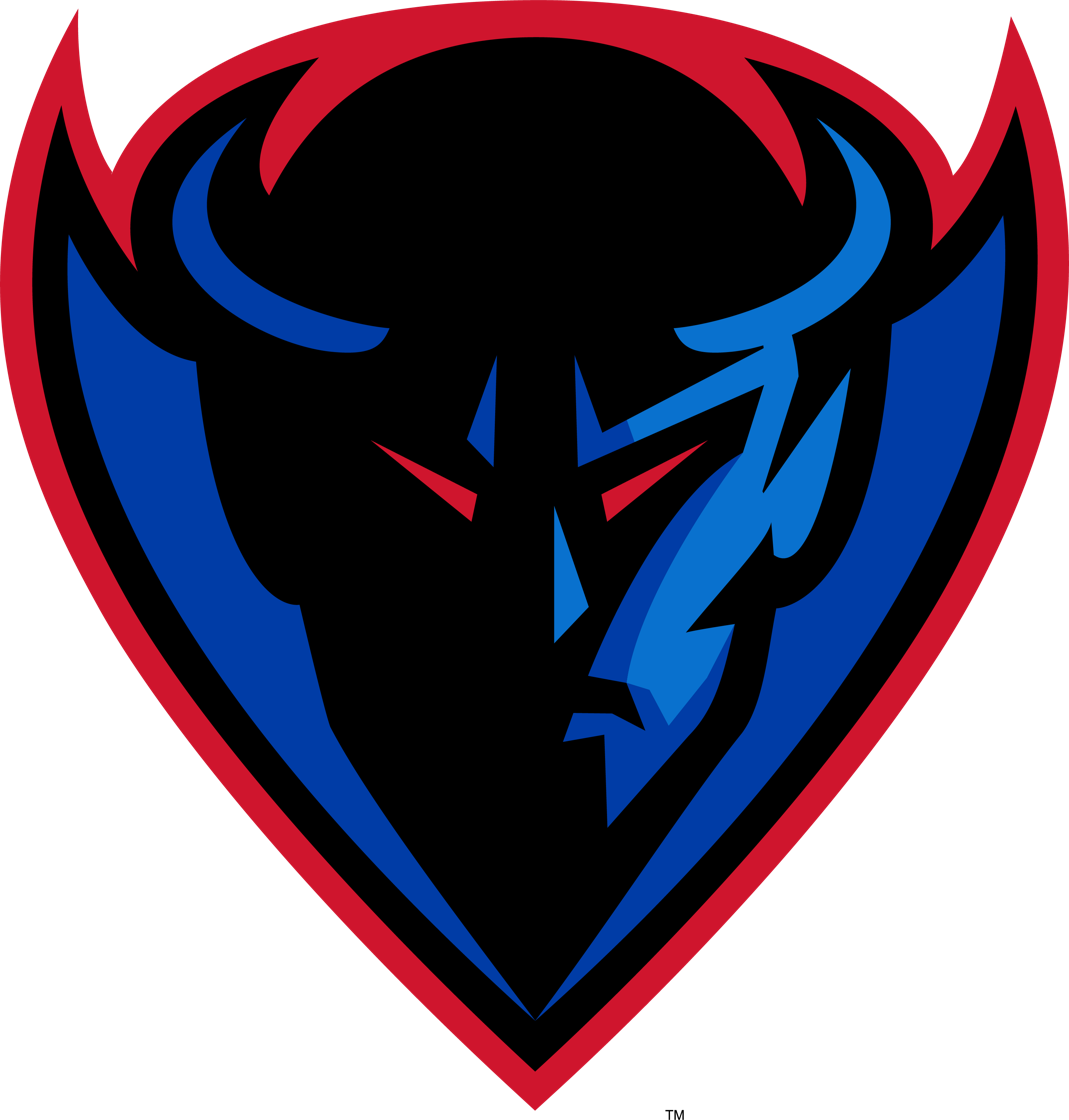

NCAA tournament, first round
- Conference: Conference USA
- American
- Record: 21–12 (9-7 CUSA)
- Head coach: Pat Kennedy (3rd season)
- Home arena: Allstate Arena

1999–2000 Conference USA men's basketball standings
	Conf.				Overall
Team	W		L	PCT	W		L	PCT
American
No. 7 Cincinnati	16	–	0	1.000	29	–	4	.879
Louisville	10	–	6	.625	19	–	12	.613
DePaul	9	–	7	.563	21	–	12	.636
Marquette	8	–	8	.500	15	–	14	.517
Saint Louis †	7	–	9	.438	19	–	14	.576
Charlotte	7	–	9	.438	17	–	16	.515
National
Tulane	8	–	8	.500	20	–	11	.645
South Florida	8	–	8	.500	17	–	14	.548
Southern Miss	7	–	9	.438	17	–	12	.586
UAB	7	–	9	.438	14	–	14	.500
Memphis	7	–	9	.438	15	–	16	.484
Houston	2	–	14	.125	9	–	22	.290
† 2000 Conference USA Tournament winner Rankings from AP Poll

1999–2000 DePaul Blue Demons men's basketball team represented DePaul University during the 1999–2000 men's college basketball season. They received the conference's automatic bid to the NCAA Tournament where they lost in the first round to Kansas.

== Schedule ==
Date time, TV	Rank^{#}	Opponent^{#}	Result	Record	Site city, state
November 20*		Howard	W 105–61	1–0	Allstate Arena (5,224); Rosemont, Illinois
November 25*		vs. American-Puerto Rico	W 114–69	2–0	Eugene Guerra Sports Complex (500); San Juan, Puerto Rico
November 26*		vs. Texas	L 64–68	2–1	Eugene Guerra Sports Complex (500); San Juan, Puerto Rico
November 27*		vs. South Carolina	W 58–46	3–1	Eugene Guerra Sports Complex (500); San Juan, Puerto Rico
December 1*		Chicago State	W 104–57	4–1	Allstate Arena (7,281); Rosemont, Illinois
December 4*		at Duke	L 83–84 ^{OT}	4–2	Cameron Indoor Stadium (9,314); Durham, NC
December 6*		Monmouth	W 69–62	5–2	Allstate Arena (7,306); Rosemont, Illinois
December 9*		Nicholls State	W 67–43	6–2	Allstate Arena (7,130); Rosemont, Illinois
December 14*		St. John’s	W 71–65	7–2	Allstate Arena (10,199); Rosemont, Illinois
December 18*		at UCLA	L 58–76	7–3	Pauley Pavilion (10,024); Los Angeles, California
December 23*		Northern Illinois	W 82–61	8–3	Allstate Arena (10,693); Rosemont, Illinois
December 28		at Memphis	W 71–65	9–3 (1–0)	The Pyramid (15,176); Memphis, Tennessee
December 30*		Elon	W 80–56	10–3 (1–0)	Allstate Arena (7,412); Rosemont, Illinois
January 8		Charlotte	W 77–75	11–3 (2–0)	Allstate Arena (9,347); Rosemont, Illinois
January 12		Marquette	L 60–69	11–4 (2–1)	Allstate Arena (10,431); Rosemont, Illinois
January 16		at Houston	W 77–68	12–4 (3–1)	Hofheinz Pavilion (5,306); Houston, Texas
January 20		at Louisville	L 59–72	12–5 (3–2)	Freedom Hall (19,484); Louisville, Kentucky
January 22		St. Louis	L 69–75 ^{OT}	12–6 (3–3)	Allstate Arena (12,174); Rosemont, Illinois
January 26*		Florida	W 71–69	13–6 (3–3)	Allstate Arena (10,515); Rosemont, Illinois
January 29		at UAB	L 68–69	13–7 (3–4)	Bartow Arena (7,345); Birmingham, Alabama
February 2		Tulane	W 85–54	14–7 (4–4)	Allstate Arena (8,112); Rosemont, Illinois
February 6		at UNC Charlotte	W 80–66	15–7 (5–4)	Dale F. Halton Arena (7,208); Charlotte, NC
February 9		South Florida	W 81–69	16–7 (6–4)	Allstate Arena (8,803); Rosemont, Illinois
February 13		at No. 1 Cincinnati	L 64–87	16–8 (6–5)	Fifth Third Arena (13,176); Cincinnati, Ohio
February 16		at Marquette	W 55–35	17–8 (7–5)	Bradley Center (12,216); Milwaukee, Wisconsin
February 19		Louisville	L 54–71	17–9 (7–6)	Allstate Arena (13,036); Rosemont, Illinois
February 26		at St. Louis	W 55–54	18–9 (8–6)	Scottrade Center (9,711); St. Louis, Missouri
March 2		No. 2 Cincinnati	L 62–64	18–10 (8–7)	Allstate Arena (18,253); Rosemont, Illinois
March 4		Southern Mississippi	W 82–51	19–10 (9–7)	Allstate Arena (9,816); Rosemont, Illinois
Conference USA tournament
March 9		at Memphis	W 80–76	20–10 (9–7)	The Pyramid (12,004); Memphis, Tennessee
March 10		vs. Charlotte	W 56–49	21–10 (9–7)	The Pyramid (9,832); Memphis, Tennessee
March 11		vs. St. Louis	L 49–56	21–11 (9–7)	The Pyramid (9,711); Memphis, Tennessee
2000 NCAA tournament
March 17		vs. Kansas; First round	L 77–81 ^{OT}	21–12 (9–7)	Lawrence Joel Coliseum (14,252); Winston-Salem, NC
*Non-conference game. ^{#}Rankings from AP Poll. (#) Tournament seedings in parentheses.
