= Tim Buckley (basketball) =

American college basketball coach (born 1963)

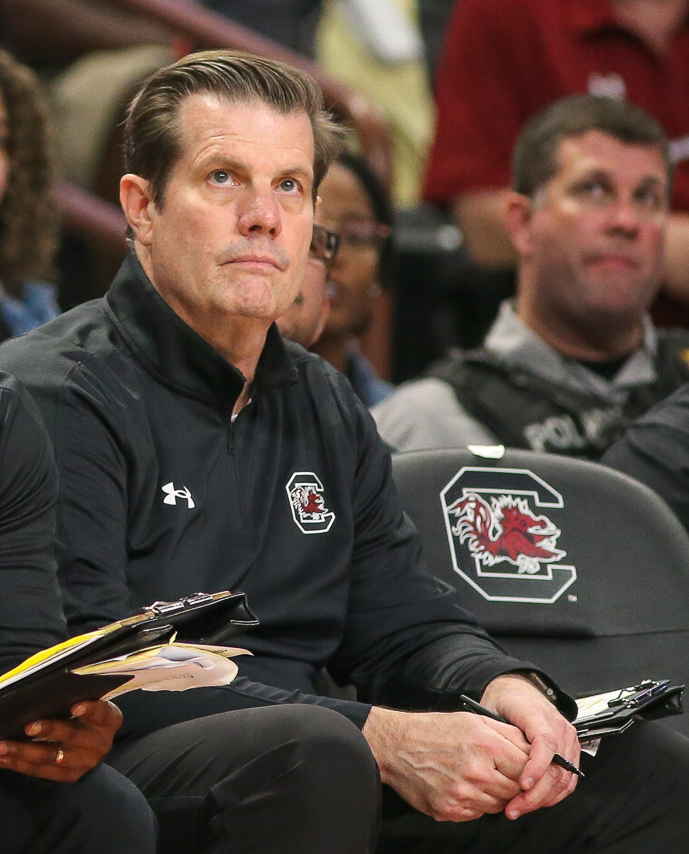
- Buckley with South Carolina

Current position
- Title: Assistant Coach
- Team: Iowa State
- Conference: Big 12

Biographical details
- Born: September 10, 1963 (age 63); Aurora, Illinois, U.S.

Playing career
- 1982–1984: Waubonsee CC
- 1984–1986: Bemidji State

Coaching career (HC unless noted)
- 1986–1988: Bemidji State (assistant)
- 1988–1989: Rockford (assistant)
- 1989–1993: Rockford
- 1993–1994: Wisconsin (assistant)
- 1994–1999: Ball State (assistant)
- 1999–2000: Marquette (assistant)
- 2000–2006: Ball State
- 2006–2007: Iowa (assistant)
- 2007–2008: Marquette (assistant)
- 2008–2017: Indiana (associate HC)
- 2019–2022: UNLV (assistant)
- 2022–2024: South Carolina (assistant)
- 2024–2026: Cincinnati (assistant)
- 2026–Present: Iowa State (assistant)

Head coaching record
- Overall: 143–139
- Tournaments: 3–1 (NIT)

Tim Buckley (born September 10, 1963) is an American college basketball coach who currently serves as an assistant coach under T.J. Otzelberger at Iowa State.

Buckley was the head men's basketball coach at Ball State University from 2000 to 2006. He is best known for leading the Cardinals to upset wins over #3 Kansas and #4 UCLA during the 2001 Maui Invitational. Buckley was an assistant coach at the University of Iowa under Steve Alford, at Marquette University where he is reunited with former Ball State player and 2006 MAC Freshman of the Year Maurice Acker, who transferred after Buckley was fired, and for 9 seasons serving as the top assistant and associate head coach for Tom Crean at Indiana University.

Buckley was also an assistant coach under T.J. Otzelberger at UNLV, at South Carolina, and most recently at Cincinnati under Wes Miller.

Buckley has also served as an assistant coach at Bemidji State (1986–88), Rockford College (1988–89, head coach 1989–93), Wisconsin (1993–94), Ball State (1994–99), Marquette (1999–2000), Iowa (2006–07), back to Marquette (2007–08), and at Indiana University (2008–2017).

== Personal life ==
Tim graduated from Aurora Central Catholic High School (Aurora, Illinois) in 1981 and went on to play two seasons at Waubonsee Community College before transferring to Bemidji State. He graduated with a B.S. in communications from the latter in 1986, and also received an M.S. in Admin. of Physical Education in 1988. He is married to Shannon and has one daughter, Meredith.

== Head coaching record ==
Record table
Season	Team	Overall	Conference	Standing	Postseason
Rockford Regents (Northern Illinois-Iowa Conference) (1989–1993)
1989–90	Rockford	16–9	6–3	T–2nd	
1990–91	Rockford	12–14	5–5	T–2nd	
1991–92	Rockford	14–12	7–3	2nd	
1992–93	Rockford	8–17	4–6	T–4th	
Rockford:		50–52	22–17		
Ball State Cardinals (Mid-American Conference) (2000–2006)
2000–01	Ball State	18–12	11–7	3rd (West)	
2001–02	Ball State	23–12	12–6	1st (West)	NIT Quarterfinal
2002–03	Ball State	13–17	8–10	4th (West)	
2003–04	Ball State	14–15	10–8	3rd (West)	
2004–05	Ball State	15–13	10–8	T–2nd (West)	
2005–06	Ball State	10–18	6–12	4th (West)	
Ball State:		93–87	57–51		
Total:		143–139			
National champion Postseason invitational champion Conference regular season champion Conference regular season and conference tournament champion Division regular season champion Division regular season and conference tournament champion Conference tournament champion
