= 1999–2000 UMass Minutemen basketball team =

American college basketball season

1999–00 UMass Minutemen men's basketball
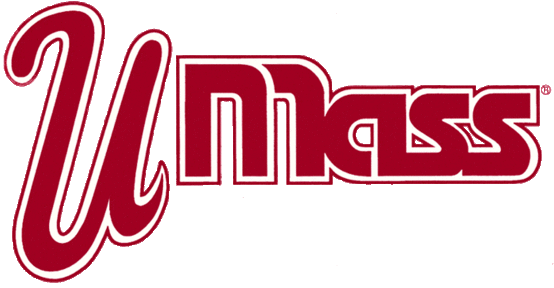

Orange Bowl Classic Champion

NIT, First Round
- Conference: Atlantic 10 Conference
- Record: 17–16 (9–7 A-10)
- Head coach: Bruiser Flint (4th season)
- Assistant coaches: Geoff Arnold; Tony Barbee; Mike Connors
- Home arena: William D. Mullins Memorial Center

1999–2000 Atlantic 10 men's basketball standings
	Conf.				Overall
Team	W		L	PCT	W		L	PCT
East
No. 5 Temple †	14	–	2	.875	27	–	6	.818
St. Bonaventure	11	–	5	.688	21	–	10	.677
UMass	9	–	7	.563	17	–	16	.515
Fordham	7	–	9	.438	14	–	15	.483
Saint Joseph's	7	–	9	.438	13	–	16	.448
Rhode Island	2	–	14	.125	5	–	25	.167
West
Dayton	11	–	5	.688	22	–	9	.710
Xavier	9	–	7	.563	21	–	12	.636
George Washington	9	–	7	.563	15	–	15	.500
Virginia Tech	8	–	8	.500	16	–	15	.516
La Salle	5	–	11	.313	11	–	17	.393
Duquesne	4	–	12	.250	9	–	20	.310
† 2000 Atlantic 10 Tournament winner Rankings from AP Poll

The 1999–00 UMass Minutemen basketball team represented the University of Massachusetts Amherst during the 1999–00 NCAA Division I men's basketball season. The Minutemen, led by fourth year head coach Bruiser Flint, played their home games at William D. Mullins Memorial Center and are members of the Atlantic 10 Conference.

The Minutemen finished the season 17–16, 9–7 in A-10 play to finish in third place. In the 2000 A-10 tournament, they defeated Duquesne and George Washington before being eliminated by Temple 54-47. In the 2000 NIT, they were eliminated in the first round by Siena 66-65.

== Roster ==
Number	Name	Position	Height	Weight	Year	Hometown
0	Anthony Oates	Center	6–10	285	Senior	Phoenix, Arizona
1	Jonathan DePina	Guard	5–9	185	Junior	South Boston, Massachusetts
3	Ronnell Blizzard	Forward	6–8	205	Sophomore	Waterbury, Connecticut
4	JoVann Johnson	Guard/Forward	6-3	205	Junior	Johnson City, Tennessee
5	Monty Mack	Guard	6–3	200	Senior	South Boston, Massachusetts
11	Darryl Denson	Guard	6–0	194	Junior	Springfield, Massachusetts
20	Winston Smith	Forward	6–5	228	Junior	Summit, New Jersey
22	Chris Kirkland	Forward	6–6	230	Senior	Timmonsville, South Carolina
23	Mike Babul	Forward	6–6	230	Senior	North Attleboro, Massachusetts
30	Shannon Crooks	Guard	6-2	222	Sophomore	Everett, Massachusetts
33	Kitwana Rhymer	Center/Forward	6–10	256	Junior	Saint Thomas, U.S. Virgin Islands
40	Micah Brand	Forward/Center	6–11	243	Freshman	Middletown, New York

== Schedule ==
Date time, TV	Rank^{#}	Opponent^{#}	Result	Record	Site (attendance) city, state
Exhibition
11/03/1999*; 7:00 pm		California All-Stars	W 103-97		Mullins Center (????); Amherst, Massachusetts
11/10/1999*; 7:00 pm		Converse All-Stars	W 97-88 ^{OT}		Mullins Center (3,718); Amherst, MA
Regular Season
11/20/1999*; 7:30 pm		at Iona	W 85-77	1–0	Mulcahy Center (3,025); New Rochelle, New York
11/22/1999*; 7:00 pm		at No. 7 UConn; U-Game	L 65-79	1–1	Gampel Pavilion (10,027); Storrs, Connecticut
11/29/1999*; 6:30 pm		Marshall	L 55-65	1–2	Mullins Center (5,682); Amherst, MA
12/02/1999*; 7:00 pm		Boston University	W 70–51	2–2	Mullins Center (5,847); Amherst, MA
12/04/1999*; 1:00 pm		at Boston College; Commonwealth Classic	W 74-67	3-2	Conte Forum (6,475); Chestnut Hill, Massachusetts
12/06/1999* ????		Villanova	W 52-51	4-2	Mullins Center (6,643); Amherst, MA
12/11/1999* ????		at Detroit	L 59-63	4-3	Calihan Hall (6,152); Detroit, Michigan
12/18/1999* ????		vs. Florida State; Orange Bowl Basketball Classic	W 69-60	5-3	National Car Rental Center (????); Sunrise, Florida
12/21/1999* ????		vs. Southern Illinois; Puerto Rico Holiday Classic	L 63-65	5-4	Eugene Guerra Sports Complex (????); Bayamon, Puerto Rico
12/22/1999* ????		vs. American (Puerto Rico); Puerto Rico Holiday Classic	W 102-65	6-4	Eugene Guerra Sports Complex (????); Bayamon, Puerto Rico
12/23/1999* ????		vs. Boston College; Puerto Rico Holiday Classic	L 59-83	6-5	Eugene Guerra Sports Complex (????); Bayamon, Puerto Rico
12/30/1999* ????		at Providence	L 60-61 ^{OT}	6-6	Providence Civic Center (9,796); Providence, Rhode Island
01/06/2000 ????		St. Bonaventure	L 60-70	6-7 (0-1)	Mullins Center (5,136); Amherst, MA
01/08/2000; 7:00 pm		Fordham	W 82-52	7-7 (1-1)	Mullins Center (5,092); Amherst, MA
01/16/2000; 4:00 pm		at St. Joseph's	W 79-71	8-7 (2-1)	Alumni Memorial Fieldhouse (3,200); Philadelphia, Pennsylvania
01/20/2000 ????		Dayton	L 52-57	8-8 (2-2)	Mullins Center (4,835); Amherst, MA
01/22/2000 ????		Rhode Island	W 89-50	9-8 (3–2)	Mullins Center (5,050); Amherst, MA
01/27/2000 ????		at Duquesne	W 84-75	10-8 (4–2)	Palumbo Center (5,565); Pittsburgh, Pennsylvania
01/29/2000 ????		at Virginia Tech	W 49-41	11-8 (5–2)	Cassell Coliseum (4,661); Blacksburg, Virginia
02/01/2000 ????		No. 21 Temple	L 48-75	11-9 (5-3)	Mullins Center (8,048); Amherst, MA
02/05/2000*; 3:00 pm		No. 16 Texas	L 57-68	11-10	Mullins Center (8,145); Amherst, MA
02/09/2000 ????		La Salle	W 82-48	12-10 (6-3)	Mullins Center (4,772); Amherst, MA
02/12/2000 ????		at Xavier	L 77-87	12-11 (6-4)	Cincinnati Gardens (10,100); Cincinnati, Ohio
2/16/2000 ????		at Fordham	W 81-72	13-11 (7–4)	Rose Hill Gymnasium (3,018); Bronx, New York
02/19/2000 ????		St. Joseph's	W 76-65	14-11 (8-4)	Mullins Center (5,356); Amherst, MA
02/22/2000 ????		at Rhode Island	W 57-37	15-11 (9-4)	Providence Civic Center (5,335); Providence, Rhode Island
02/26/2000 ????		at No. 8 Temple	L 54-72	15-12 (9-5)	Liacouras Center (9,714); Philadelphia, PA
02/29/2000 ????		George Washington	L 86-87	15-13 (9-6)	Mullins Center (5,430); Amherst, MA
03/04/2000 ????		at St. Bonaventure	L 69-86	15-14 (9-7)	Reilly Center (6,000); St. Bonaventure, New York
2000 Atlantic 10 men's basketball tournament
03/08/2000 ????		vs. Duquesne; 1st Round	W 77-52	16-14	First Union Spectrum (5,528); Philadelphia, PA
03/09/2000 ????		vs. George Washington; Quarterfinal	W 86-68	17-14	First Union Spectrum (7,002); Philadelphia, PA
03/10/2000 ????		vs. No. 6 Temple; Semifinal	L 47-54	17-15	First Union Spectrum (????); Philadelphia, PA
2000 NIT
03/16/2000* ????		at Siena; First Round	L 65-66	17-16	Pepsi Arena (9,649); Albany, New York
*Non-conference game. ^{#}Rankings from AP Poll. (#) Tournament seedings in parentheses. All times are in Eastern Time.
