= 1999–2000 Oregon Ducks men's basketball team =

American college basketball season

1999–00 Oregon Ducks men's basketball

NCAA tournament, Round of 64
- Conference: Pacific-10 Conference
- Record: 22-8 (13-5 Pac-10)
- Head coach: Ernie Kent (3rd season)
- Assistant coaches: Mark Hudson; Kenny Payne
- Home arena: McArthur Court

1999–2000 Pacific-10 Conference men's basketball standings
	Conf.				Overall
Team	W		L	PCT	W		L	PCT
No. 8 Arizona	15	–	3	.833	27	–	7	.794
No. 5 Stanford	15	–	3	.833	27	–	4	.871
Oregon	13	–	5	.722	22	–	8	.733
No. 23 UCLA	10	–	8	.556	21	–	12	.636
Arizona State	10	–	8	.556	18	–	12	.600
USC	9	–	9	.500	16	–	14	.533
California	7	–	11	.389	16	–	14	.533
Oregon State	5	–	13	.278	13	–	16	.448
Washington	5	–	13	.278	10	–	20	.333
Washington State	1	–	17	.056	6	–	22	.214
As of July 26, 2011; Rankings from AP Poll

The 1999–2000 Oregon Ducks men's basketball team represented the University of Oregon as a member of the Pacific-10 Conference during the 1999–2000 NCAA Division I men's basketball season. The team was led by third-year head coach Ernie Kent and played their home games at McArthur Court in Eugene, Oregon. The Ducks finished third in the Pac-10 regular season standings, and received an at-large bid to the NCAA tournament. Playing as the No. 7 seed in the East region, Oregon lost to No. 10 seed Seton Hall, 72–71 in overtime. The team finished with a record of 22–8 (13–5 Pac-10).

== Roster ==
1999–2000 Oregon Ducks men's basketball team
Players
Coaches

Pos.	#	Name	Height	Weight	Year	Hometown
F/C	00	AD Smith	6 ft 8 in (2.03 m)	—	Sr	Eugene, Oregon
G	20	Fred Jones	6 ft 4 in (1.93 m)	210 lb (95 kg)	So	Gresham, Oregon
SG	33	Alex Scales	6 ft 4 in (1.93 m)	180 lb (82 kg)	Sr	Racine, Wisconsin

Head coach

- Ernie Kent (Oregon)

Assistant coach(es)

Legend

- (C) Team captain
- (S) Suspended
- (I) Ineligible
- (W) Walk-on
- Injured
- Current redshirt

Roster

== Schedule and results ==
Date time, TV	Rank^{#}	Opponent^{#}	Result	Record	Site city, state
Regular Season
Nov 23, 1999*		at Illinois-Chicago	W 65–58	1–0	UIC Pavilion; Chicago, Illinois
Nov 30, 1999*		Portland	W 74–62	2–0	McArthur Court; Eugene, Oregon
Dec 3, 1999*		at Portland State	W 91–87	3–0	Peter W. Stott Center; Portland, Oregon
Dec 11, 1999*		Cal State Northridge	L 77–79	3–1	McArthur Court; Eugene, Oregon
Dec 14, 1999*		Denver	W 101–53	4–1	McArthur Court; Eugene, Oregon
Dec 18, 1999*		Minnesota	W 82–75	5–1	McArthur Court; Eugene, Oregon
Dec 22, 1999*		Northern Arizona	W 91–54	6–1	McArthur Court; Eugene, Oregon
Dec 28, 1999*		vs. No. 19 Wake Forest; Outrigger Hotel Rainbow Classic	W 67–66	7–1	Stan Sheriff Center; Honolulu, Hawaii
Dec 29, 1999*		vs. Gonzaga; Outrigger Hotel Rainbow Classic	W 70–64	8–1	Stan Sheriff Center; Honolulu, Hawaii
Dec 31, 1999*		at Hawaii; Outrigger Hotel Rainbow Classic	L 63–66	8–2	Stan Sheriff Center; Honolulu, Hawaii
Jan 4, 2000*		Saint Martin's	W 94–52	9–2	McArthur Court; Eugene, Oregon
Jan 8, 2000		at Oregon State	W 67–49	10–2 (1–0)	Gill Coliseum; Corvallis, Oregon
Jan 13, 2000		California	W 83–68	11–2 (2–0)	McArthur Court; Eugene, Oregon
Jan 15, 2000		No. 3 Stanford	L 71–85	11–3 (2–1)	McArthur Court; Eugene, Oregon
Jan 20, 2000		at Washington	W 76–74 ^{OT}	12–3 (3–1)	Bank of America Arena; Seattle, Washington
Jan 22, 2000		at Washington State	W 81–80 ^{OT}	13–3 (4–1)	Friel Court; Pullman, Washington
Jan 27, 2000		No. 23 USC	W 68–67	14–3 (5–1)	McArthur Court; Eugene, Oregon
Jan 29, 2000		UCLA	W 73–58	15–3 (6–1)	McArthur Court; Eugene, Oregon
Feb 3, 2000	No. 23	at No. 9 Arizona	L 71–77	15–4 (6–2)	McKale Center; Tucson, Arizona
Feb 5, 2000	No. 23	at Arizona State	W 86–73	16–4 (7–2)	ASU Activity Center; Tempe, Arizona
Feb 10, 2000	No. 24	at No. 2 Stanford	L 61–76	16–5 (7–3)	Maples Pavilion; Stanford, California
Feb 12, 2000	No. 24	at California	W 64–60	17–5 (8–3)	Haas Pavilion; Berkeley, California
Feb 17, 2000		Washington State	W 70–53	18–5 (9–3)	McArthur Court; Eugene, Oregon
Feb 19, 2000		Washington	L 58–67	18–6 (9–4)	McArthur Court; Eugene, Oregon
Feb 24, 2000		at UCLA	L 69–75	18–7 (9–5)	Pauley Pavilion; Los Angeles, California
Feb 26, 2000		at USC	W 80–77	19–7 (10–5)	L.A. Sports Arena; Los Angeles, California
Mar 2, 2000		Arizona State	W 76–74	20–7 (11–5)	McArthur Court; Eugene, Oregon
Mar 4, 2000		No. 3 Arizona	W 86–81	21–7 (12–5)	McArthur Court; Eugene, Oregon
Mar 11, 2000		Oregon State	W 83–65	22–7 (13–5)	McArthur Court; Eugene, Oregon
NCAA Tournament
Mar 17, 2000*	(7 E)	vs. (10 E) Seton Hall; First Round	L 71–72 ^{OT}	22–8	HSBC Arena; Buffalo, New York
*Non-conference game. ^{#}Rankings from AP Poll. (#) Tournament seedings in parentheses. E=East.
