= 1999–2000 Washington Huskies men's basketball team =

American college basketball season

1999–2000 Washington Huskies men's basketball
- Conference: Pacific-10 Conference
- Record: 10–20 (5–13 Pac-10)
- Head coach: Bob Bender (7th season)
- Home arena: KeyArena (during renovation of Hec Edmundson Pavilion)

1999–2000 Pacific-10 Conference men's basketball standings
	Conf.				Overall
Team	W		L	PCT	W		L	PCT
No. 8 Arizona	15	–	3	.833	27	–	7	.794
No. 5 Stanford	15	–	3	.833	27	–	4	.871
Oregon	13	–	5	.722	22	–	8	.733
No. 23 UCLA	10	–	8	.556	21	–	12	.636
Arizona State	10	–	8	.556	18	–	12	.600
USC	9	–	9	.500	16	–	14	.533
California	7	–	11	.389	16	–	14	.533
Oregon State	5	–	13	.278	13	–	16	.448
Washington	5	–	13	.278	10	–	20	.333
Washington State	1	–	17	.056	6	–	22	.214
As of July 26, 2011; Rankings from AP Poll

The 1999–2000 Washington Huskies men's basketball team represented the University of Washington for the 1999–2000 NCAA Division I men's basketball season. Led by seventh-year head coach Bob Bender, the Huskies were members of the Pacific-10 Conference and played their home games this season off campus at KeyArena in Seattle, Washington.

The Huskies were 10–20 overall in the regular season and 5–13 in conference play, tied for eighth in the standings. There was no conference tournament this season; last played in 1990, it resumed in 2002.

Built over seventy years earlier in 1927, Hec Edmundson Pavilion underwent a renovation this season and reopened in the fall of 2000. The Huskies' interim home court was KeyArena at Seattle Center, the home of the NBA's Seattle SuperSonics. Washington won just twice at KeyArena in Pac-10 play, a one-point upset of UCLA in early January, and a four-point win over rival Washington State in March; in between, they lost seven consecutive home games.
