= 2000 Atlantic 10 men's basketball tournament =

- Classification: Division I
- Season: 1999–00
- Teams: 12
- Site: First Union Spectrum; Philadelphia
- Champions: Temple (5th title)
- Winning coach: John Chaney (5th title)
- MVP: Quincy Wadley (Temple)

1999–2000 Atlantic 10 men's basketball standings
	Conf.				Overall
Team	W		L	PCT	W		L	PCT
East
No. 5 Temple †	14	–	2	.875	27	–	6	.818
St. Bonaventure	11	–	5	.688	21	–	10	.677
UMass	9	–	7	.563	17	–	16	.515
Fordham	7	–	9	.438	14	–	15	.483
Saint Joseph's	7	–	9	.438	13	–	16	.448
Rhode Island	2	–	14	.125	5	–	25	.167
West
Dayton	11	–	5	.688	22	–	9	.710
Xavier	9	–	7	.563	21	–	12	.636
George Washington	9	–	7	.563	15	–	15	.500
Virginia Tech	8	–	8	.500	16	–	15	.516
La Salle	5	–	11	.313	11	–	17	.393
Duquesne	4	–	12	.250	9	–	20	.310
† 2000 Atlantic 10 Tournament winner Rankings from AP Poll

The 2000 Atlantic 10 men's basketball tournament was played from March 8 to March 11, 2000. The tournament was played at The Spectrum in Philadelphia, Pennsylvania. The winner was named champion of the Atlantic 10 Conference and received an automatic bid to the 2000 NCAA Men's Division I Basketball Tournament. The top two teams in each division received a first-round bye in the conference tournament.

Sixth-seeded Temple won the tournament. Dayton and St. Bonaventure also received bids to the NCAA Tournament. Quincy Wadley of Temple was named the tournament's Most Outstanding Player. Future NBA players Mark Karcher and Pepe Sánchez of Temple were among those joining Wadley on the All-Championship Team.

== Bracket ==
First round Wednesday, March 8
W4	Virginia Tech	51
E5	Fordham	48
E3	UMass	77
W6	Duquesne	52
E4	Saint Joseph's	65
W5	La Salle	56
W3	Xavier	75
E6	Rhode Island	60

Quarterfinals; Thursday, March 9
E1	#6 Temple	71
W4	Virginia Tech	52
W2	George Washington	68
E3	UMass	86
W1	Dayton	67
E4	Saint Joseph's	64
E2	St. Bonaventure	72
W3	Xavier	69

Semifinals; Friday, March 10
E1	#6 Temple	54
E3	UMass	47
W1	Dayton	69
E2	St. Bonaventure	72

Final; Saturday, March 11
E1	#6 Temple	65
E2	St. Bonaventure	44

All games played at The Spectrum, Philadelphia, Pennsylvania
