= 1999–2000 North Carolina Tar Heels men's basketball team =

American college basketball season

1999–2000 North Carolina Tar Heels men's basketball

Maui Invitational Tournament champions

NCAA tournament, Final Four
- Conference: Atlantic Coast Conference

Ranking
- Coaches: No. 11
- Record: 22–14 (9–7 ACC)
- Head coach: Bill Guthridge (3rd season)
- Assistant coaches: Phil Ford (12th season); Dave Hanners (10th season); Pat Sullivan (3rd season)
- Home arena: Dean Smith Center

1999–2000 ACC men's basketball standings
	Conf.				Overall
Team	W		L	PCT	W		L	PCT
No. 1 Duke †	15	–	1	.938	29	–	5	.853
No. 17 Maryland	11	–	5	.688	25	–	10	.714
Virginia	9	–	7	.563	19	–	12	.613
North Carolina	9	–	7	.563	22	–	14	.611
Wake Forest	7	–	9	.438	22	–	14	.611
NC State	6	–	10	.375	20	–	14	.588
Florida State	5	–	11	.313	13	–	17	.433
Georgia Tech	5	–	11	.313	13	–	17	.433
Clemson	4	–	12	.250	10	–	20	.333
† 2000 ACC tournament winner Rankings from AP Poll

The 1999–2000 North Carolina Tar Heels men's basketball team represented the University of North Carolina at Chapel Hill.

Led by head coach Bill Guthridge, the Tar Heels reached the Final Four of the NCAA tournament. It marked the 15th Final Four appearance in program history, and the second in three years for Coach Guthridge.

== Roster ==
1999–2000 North Carolina Tar Heels men's basketball team
Players
Coaches

Pos.	#	Name	Height	Weight	Year	Previous school	Hometown
C	00	Brendan Haywood	7 ft 0 in (2.13 m)	255 lb (116 kg)	Jr	Dudley	Greensboro, North Carolina
G	5	Ed Cota (C)	6 ft 1 in (1.85 m)	195 lb (88 kg)	Sr	St. Thomas More Academy	Brooklyn, New York
G/F	11	Michael Brooker	6 ft 6 in (1.98 m)	220 lb (100 kg)	Jr	Brentwood Academy	Sandersville, Georgia
G	14	Jonathan Holmes	6 ft 0 in (1.83 m)	175 lb (79 kg)	Fr	Bloomington South	Bloomington, Indiana
G	15	Kenny White	6 ft 0 in (1.83 m)	174 lb (79 kg)	Jr	Oak Hill Academy	Chattanooga, Tennessee
G	21	Terrence Newby	6 ft 2 in (1.88 m)	208 lb (94 kg)	Sr	Jordan-Matthews	Siler City, North Carolina
G	22	Ronald Curry	6 ft 2 in (1.88 m)	200 lb (91 kg)	So	Hampton	Hampton, Virginia
G	24	Max Owens	6 ft 5 in (1.96 m)	198 lb (90 kg)	Jr	Mount Zion Academy	Macon, Georgia
G/F	25	Jason Capel	6 ft 8 in (2.03 m)	220 lb (100 kg)	So	St. John's Prospect Hall	Fayetteville, North Carolina
F	32	Orlando Meléndez	6 ft 8 in (2.03 m)	200 lb (91 kg)	So	McDowell	Juana Díaz, Puerto Rico
F	35	Jim Everett (W)	6 ft 8 in (2.03 m)	240 lb (109 kg)	Jr	Providence	Charlotte, North Carolina
G	40	Joseph Forte	6 ft 4 in (1.93 m)	185 lb (84 kg)	Fr	DeMatha	Greenbelt, Maryland
F/C	42	Kris Lang	6 ft 11 in (2.11 m)	243 lb (110 kg)	So	Hunter Huss	Gastonia, North Carolina
F	43	Matt Laczkowski	6 ft 9 in (2.06 m)	210 lb (95 kg)	Sr	Westminster	Westminster, Maryland
F	44	Will Johnson (W)	6 ft 8 in (2.03 m)	211 lb (96 kg)	Fr	Hickory	Hickory, North Carolina
F	45	Julius Peppers	6 ft 7 in (2.01 m)	250 lb (113 kg)	Fr	Southern Nash	Bailey, North Carolina
F/C	50	Brian Bersticker	6 ft 10 in (2.08 m)	232 lb (105 kg)	So	Kempsville	Virginia Beach, Virginia

Head coach

- Bill Guthridge (Kansas State)

Assistant coach(es)

- Phil Ford (North Carolina)

Legend

- (C) Team captain
- (S) Suspended
- (I) Ineligible
- (W) Walk-on
- Injured
- Current redshirt

== Schedule and results ==
Date time, TV	Rank^{#}	Opponent^{#}	Result	Record	High points	High rebounds	High assists	Site (attendance) city, state
Non-conference regular season
November 22, 1999*; 9:00 pm, ESPN	No. 4	vs. USC; Maui Invitational Tournament – First Round	W 82–65	1–0	24 – Forte	7 – Tied	10 – Cota	Lahaina Civic Center (2,400); Maui, Hawai'i
November 23, 1999*; 10:00 pm, ESPN	No. 4	vs. Georgetown; Maui Invitational Tournament – Semifinals	W 85–79	2–0	20 – Tied	8 – Tied	7 – Cota	Lahaina Civic Center (2,400); Maui, Hawai'i
November 24, 1999*; 10:30 pm, ESPN	No. 4	vs. No. 22 Purdue; Maui Invitational Tournament – Championship Game	W 90–75	3–0	21 – Forte	6 – Tied	7 – Cota	Lahaina Civic Center (2,400); Maui, Hawai'i
December 1, 1999*; 9:00 pm, ESPN	No. 2	No. 8 Michigan State; ACC–Big Ten Challenge	L 76–86	3–1	19 – Forte	9 – Capel	11 – Cota	Dean Smith Center (21,572); Chapel Hill, North Carolina
December 3, 1999*; 9:00 pm, Raycom Sports	No. 2	vs. College of Charleston; Food Lion MVP Classic	W 72–54	4–1	16 – Capel	6 – Tied	7 – Cota	Charlotte Coliseum (12,706); Charlotte, North Carolina
December 4, 1999*; 9:00 pm, Raycom Sports	No. 2	vs. UNLV; Food Lion MVP Classic	W 102–78	5–1	23 – Owens	9 – Capel	17 – Cota	Charlotte Coliseum (12,289); Charlotte, North Carolina
December 7, 1999*	No. 7	at Buffalo	W 91–67	6–1	19 – Forte	12 – Capel	7 – Cota	Alumni Arena (8,926); Buffalo, New York
December 8, 1999*; 9:00 pm, ESPN	No. 7	vs. No. 1 Cincinnati; Great Eight	L 68–77	6–2	18 – Owens	6 – Capel	7 – Cota	United Center (13,463); Chicago, Illinois
December 12, 1999*; 1:30 pm, Raycom Sports	No. 7	Tennessee Tech	W 85–59	7–2	21 – Capel	6 – Tied	7 – Cota	Dean Smith Center (17,512); Chapel Hill, North Carolina
December 18, 1999*; 7:00 pm, ESPN	No. 7	vs. Miami (FL); Orange Bowl Basketball Classic	W 78–68	8–2	20 – Capel	14 – Capel	9 – Cota	National Car Rental Center (7,000); Sunrise, Florida
December 21, 1999*; 7:00 pm, ESPN	No. 6	vs. No. 20 Indiana; Jimmy V Classic	L 73–82	8–3	20 – Haywood	8 – Capel	11 – Cota	Continental Airlines Arena (15,000); East Rutherford, New Jersey
December 23, 1999*; 9:00 pm, ESPN	No. 6	at Louisville	L 80–97	8–4	22 – Owens	10 – Haywood	9 – Cota	Freedom Hall (19,820); Louisville, Kentucky
January 2, 2000*	No. 14	Howard	W 86–53	9–4	21 – Haywood	10 – Haywood	12 – Cota	Dean Smith Center (17,783); Chapel Hill, North Carolina
ACC Regular Season
January 6, 2000; 8:00 pm, Raycom Sports	No. 14	Clemson	W 65–45	10–4 (1–0)	15 – Forte	13 – Peppers	7 – Cota	Dean Smith Center (19,566); Chapel Hill, North Carolina
January 8, 2000; 8:00 pm, Raycom Sports	No. 14	NC State; Rivalry Game	W 83–75	11–4 (2–0)	23 – Cota	7 – Haywood	4 – Tied	Dean Smith Center (21,572); Chapel Hill, North Carolina
January 12, 2000; 9:00 pm, ESPN	No. 13	at Wake Forest; Rivalry Game	L 57–66	11–5 (2–1)	14 – Lang	11 – Lang	5 – Cota	Lawrence Joel Veterans Memorial Coliseum (14,377); Winston-Salem, North Carolina
January 15, 2000*; 4:00 pm, CBS	No. 13	UCLA	L 68–71	11–6	21 – Capel	7 – Lang	8 – Cota	Dean Smith Center (21,572); Chapel Hill, North Carolina
January 18, 2000; 8:00 pm, Raycom Sports	No. 21	at Virginia	L 85–87	11–7 (2–2)	27 – Forte	12 – Haywood	10 – Cota	University Hall (8,394); Charlottesville, Virginia
January 22, 2000; 1:00 pm, ABC	No. 21	Florida State	L 71–76	11–8 (2–3)	15 – Tied	9 – Haywood	6 – Holmes	Dean Smith Center (21,572); Chapel Hill, North Carolina
January 27, 2000; 7:00 pm, ESPN		No. 22 Maryland	W 75–63	12–8 (3–3)	24 – Haywood	12 – Capel	8 – Cota	Dean Smith Center (15,455); Chapel Hill, North Carolina
January 29, 2000; 12:00 pm, ESPN		at Georgia Tech	W 70–53	13–8 (4–3)	20 – Capel	8 – Haywood	6 – Cota	Alexander Memorial Coliseum (10,000); Atlanta, Georgia
February 3, 2000; 9:00 pm, ESPN2		No. 3 Duke; Rivalry Game	L 86–90 ^{OT}	13–9 (4–4)	20 – Forte	10 – Haywood	8 – Cota	Dean Smith Center (21,750); Chapel Hill, North Carolina
February 6, 2000; 1:30 pm, Raycom Sports		at Clemson	W 73–60	14–9 (5–4)	17 – Cota	8 – Haywood	7 – Cota	Littlejohn Coliseum (10,300); Columbia, South Carolina
February 9, 2000; 7:00 pm, ESPN		at NC State; Rivalry Game	W 70–62	15–9 (6–4)	19 – Haywood	10 – Haywood	11 – Cota	Raleigh Entertainment & Sports Arena (19,722); Raleigh, North Carolina
February 12, 2000; 1:30 pm, ABC		Wake Forest; Rivalry Game	W 87–64	16–9 (7–4)	20 – Haywood	13 – Capel	13 – Cota	Dean Smith Center (21,572); Chapel Hill, North Carolina
February 20, 2000; 4:00 pm, ESPN2		Virginia	L 76–90	16–10 (7–5)	17 – Capel	9 – Capel	4 – Tied	Dean Smith Center (21,572); Chapel Hill, North Carolina
February 23, 2000; 7:00 pm, ESPN		at Florida State	W 70–67	17–10 (8–5)	19 – Haywood	6 – Haywood	7 – Capel	Tallahassee–Leon County Civic Center (6,815); Tallahassee, Florida
February 26, 2000; 1:30 pm, Raycom Sports		at No. 19 Maryland	L 73–81	17–11 (8–6)	26 – Forte	17 – Haywood	6 – Cota	Cole Fieldhouse (14,500); College Park, Maryland
March 1, 2000; 9:00 pm, Raycom Sports		Georgia Tech	W 74–72 ^{OT}	18–11 (9–6)	19 – Forte	8 – Haywood	11 – Cota	Dean Smith Center (20,455); Chapel Hill, North Carolina
March 4, 2000; 3:30 pm, ABC		at No. 4 Duke; Rivalry Game	L 76–90	18–12 (9–7)	24 – Forte	7 – Cota	13 – Cota	Cameron Indoor Stadium (9,314); Durham, North Carolina
ACC Tournament
March 10, 2000*; 12:00 pm, ESPN	(4)	vs. (5) Wake Forest; Quarterfinals / Rivalry Game	L 52–58	18–13	14 – Capel	7 – Tied	5 – Capel	Independence Arena (23,895); Charlotte, North Carolina
NCAA Tournament
March 17, 2000*; 7:55 pm, CBS	(8 S)	vs. (9 S) Missouri; First Round	W 84–70	19–13	28 – Haywood	15 – Haywood	10 – Cota	BJCC Arena (14,146); Birmingham, Alabama
March 19, 2000*; 2:20 pm, CBS	(8 S)	vs. (1 S) No. 3 Stanford; Second Round	W 60–53	20–13	17 – Forte	8 – Haywood	10 – Cota	BJCC Arena (14,000); Birmingham, Alabama
March 24, 2000*; 9:30 pm, CBS	(8 S)	vs. (4 S) No. 11 Tennessee; Sweet Sixteen	W 74–69	21–13	22 – Forte	7 – Cota	5 – Tied	Frank Erwin Center (16,731); Austin, Texas
March 26, 2000*; 2:40 pm, CBS	(8 S)	vs. (7 S) No. 18 Tulsa; Elite Eight	W 59–55	22–13	28 – Forte	8 – Tied	4 – Cota	Frank Erwin Center (16,731); Austin, Texas
April 1, 2000*; 8:17 pm, CBS	(8 S)	vs. (5 E) No. 13 Florida; Final Four	L 59–71	22–14	20 – Haywood	12 – Haywood	8 – Cota	RCA Dome (43,116); Indianapolis, Indiana
*Non-conference game. ^{#}Rankings from AP. (#) Tournament seedings in parentheses. All times are in Eastern Time. S = South, E = East.
