= 1999 Maui Invitational =

1999 Maui Invitational Tournament
- Season: 1999–00
- Teams: 8
- Finals site: Lahaina Civic Center; Maui, Hawaii
- Champions: North Carolina (1st title)
- Runner-up: Purdue (1st title game)
- Semifinalists: Florida; Georgetown
- Winning coach: Bill Guthridge (1st title)
- MVP: Joseph Forte (North Carolina)

The 1999 Maui Invitational Tournament was an early-season college basketball tournament that was played, for the 16th time, from November 22 to November 24, 1999. The tournament, which began in 1984, was part of the 1999–00 NCAA Division I men's basketball season. The tournament was played at the Lahaina Civic Center in Maui, Hawaii and was won by the North Carolina Tar Heels. It was the first title for both the program and for its head coach Bill Guthridge.

The field consisted of four teams which would make the 2000 NCAA tournament.

== Bracket ==
5th place game November 24
Utah State	52
USC	50
7th place game
Chaminade	65
Memphis	88

Consolation 2nd Round; November 23
Chaminade	48
Utah State	70
Memphis	65
USC	92

First Round; November 22
Chaminade	78
24	Purdue	96
Utah State	58
7	Florida	60
Memphis	55
Georgetown	71
5	North Carolina	82
USC	65

Semifinals; November 23
22	Purdue	79
6	Florida	68
Georgetown	79
4	North Carolina	85

Championship; November 24
22	Purdue	75
4	North Carolina	90
3rd place game
6	Florida	72
Georgetown	62
