= 2000 ACC men's basketball tournament =

- 2000 ACC Tournament logo
- Classification: Division I
- Season: 1999–00
- Teams: 9
- Site: Charlotte Coliseum; Charlotte, North Carolina
- Champions: Duke (11th title)
- Winning coach: Mike Krzyzewski (5th title)
- MVP: Jason Williams (Duke)

The 2000 Atlantic Coast Conference men's basketball tournament took place from March 9 to 12 in Charlotte, North Carolina, at the second Charlotte Coliseum. Duke won the tournament for the second year in a row, defeating Maryland in the championship game. Jason Williams of Duke was the tournament MVP.

1999–2000 ACC men's basketball standings
	Conf.				Overall
Team	W		L	PCT	W		L	PCT
No. 1 Duke †	15	–	1	.938	29	–	5	.853
No. 17 Maryland	11	–	5	.688	25	–	10	.714
Virginia	9	–	7	.563	19	–	12	.613
North Carolina	9	–	7	.563	22	–	14	.611
Wake Forest	7	–	9	.438	22	–	14	.611
NC State	6	–	10	.375	20	–	14	.588
Florida State	5	–	11	.313	13	–	17	.433
Georgia Tech	5	–	11	.313	13	–	17	.433
Clemson	4	–	12	.250	10	–	20	.333
† 2000 ACC tournament winner Rankings from AP Poll

== Bracket ==
First round March 9
1	#3 Duke	94
9	Clemson	63
7	Florida State	63
8	Georgia Tech	62

Quarterfinals; March 10
1	#3 Duke
(bye)
4	North Carolina	52
5	Wake Forest	58
2	#20 Maryland	82
7	Florida State	61
3	Virginia	65
6	NC State	76

Semifinals; March 11
1	#3 Duke	82
5	Wake Forest	73
2	#20 Maryland	64
6	NC State	61

Championship Game; March 12
1	#3 Duke	81
2	#20 Maryland	68

AP rankings at time of tournament

== Television ==
Network	Play-by-play announcer	Color analyst(s)	Sideline reporter(s)
ESPN (non-ACC markets); Raycom/JP Sports (ACC markets)			

== Local radio ==
Seed	Teams	Flagship station	Play-by-play announcer	Color analyst(s)
4	North Carolina	WCHL–AM (North Carolina)	Woody Durham	Mick Mixon
5	Wake Forest	WBRF (Wake Forest)	Stan Cotten	Mark Freidinger
