= 1999–2000 Washington State Cougars men's basketball team =

American college basketball season

1999–2000 Washington State Cougars men's basketball
- Conference: Pacific-10 Conference
- Record: 6–22 (1–17 Pac-10)
- Head coach: Paul Graham (1st season)
- Home arena: Beasley Coliseum

1999–2000 Pacific-10 Conference men's basketball standings
	Conf.				Overall
Team	W		L	PCT	W		L	PCT
No. 8 Arizona	15	–	3	.833	27	–	7	.794
No. 5 Stanford	15	–	3	.833	27	–	4	.871
Oregon	13	–	5	.722	22	–	8	.733
No. 23 UCLA	10	–	8	.556	21	–	12	.636
Arizona State	10	–	8	.556	18	–	12	.600
USC	9	–	9	.500	16	–	14	.533
California	7	–	11	.389	16	–	14	.533
Oregon State	5	–	13	.278	13	–	16	.448
Washington	5	–	13	.278	10	–	20	.333
Washington State	1	–	17	.056	6	–	22	.214
As of July 26, 2011; Rankings from AP Poll

The 1999–2000 Washington State Cougars men's basketball team represented Washington State University for the 1999–2000 NCAA Division I men's basketball season. Led by first-year head coach Paul Graham, the Cougars were members of the Pacific-10 Conference and played their home games on campus at Beasley Coliseum in Pullman, Washington.

The Cougars were 6–22 overall in the regular season and 1–17 in conference play, last in the standings. There was no conference tournament this season; last played in 1990, it resumed in 2002.

Graham was hired in March 1999; he was previously an assistant at Oklahoma State under Eddie Sutton.
