= 1999–2000 Florida State Seminoles men's basketball team =

American college basketball season

1999–2000 Florida State Seminoles men's basketball
- Conference: Atlantic Coast Conference
- Record: 12-17 (6-10 ACC)
- Head coach: Steve Robinson (3rd season)
- Assistant coaches: Coleman Crawford (3rd season); Jim Platt (3rd season)
- Home arena: Tallahassee-Leon County Civic Center

1999–2000 ACC men's basketball standings
	Conf.				Overall
Team	W		L	PCT	W		L	PCT
No. 1 Duke †	15	–	1	.938	29	–	5	.853
No. 17 Maryland	11	–	5	.688	25	–	10	.714
Virginia	9	–	7	.563	19	–	12	.613
North Carolina	9	–	7	.563	22	–	14	.611
Wake Forest	7	–	9	.438	22	–	14	.611
NC State	6	–	10	.375	20	–	14	.588
Florida State	5	–	11	.313	13	–	17	.433
Georgia Tech	5	–	11	.313	13	–	17	.433
Clemson	4	–	12	.250	10	–	20	.333
† 2000 ACC tournament winner Rankings from AP Poll

The 1999–2000 Florida State Seminoles men's basketball team represented Florida State University in the 1999–2000 NCAA Division I men's basketball season. The team was coached by Steve Robinson.

On December 18, 1999, UMass defeated Florida State 69-60 in the 1999 Orange Bowl Basketball Classic.

The Seminoles finished the season with a 12-17 record. Their season ended on March 10, 2000 after a 82-61 loss to Maryland in the ACC tournament 2nd round.
