= 1999–2000 Dayton Flyers men's basketball team =

American college basketball season

1999–2000 Dayton Flyers men's basketball
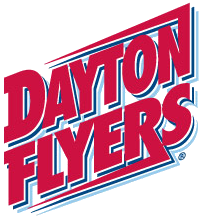

Atlantic 10 West champions

NCAA tournament, first round
- Conference: Atlantic 10 Conference
- Record: 22–9 (11–5 A-10)
- Head coach: Oliver Purnell (6th season)
- Assistant coaches: Ron Jirsa; Frank Smith; Josh Postorino
- Home arena: University of Dayton Arena

1999–2000 Atlantic 10 men's basketball standings
	Conf.				Overall
Team	W		L	PCT	W		L	PCT
East
No. 5 Temple †	14	–	2	.875	27	–	6	.818
St. Bonaventure	11	–	5	.688	21	–	10	.677
UMass	9	–	7	.563	17	–	16	.515
Fordham	7	–	9	.438	14	–	15	.483
Saint Joseph's	7	–	9	.438	13	–	16	.448
Rhode Island	2	–	14	.125	5	–	25	.167
West
Dayton	11	–	5	.688	22	–	9	.710
Xavier	9	–	7	.563	21	–	12	.636
George Washington	9	–	7	.563	15	–	15	.500
Virginia Tech	8	–	8	.500	16	–	15	.516
La Salle	5	–	11	.313	11	–	17	.393
Duquesne	4	–	12	.250	9	–	20	.310
† 2000 Atlantic 10 Tournament winner Rankings from AP Poll

The 1999–2000 Dayton Flyers men's basketball team represented the University of Dayton during the 1999–2000 NCAA Division I men's basketball season. The Flyers, led by sixth year head coach Oliver Purnell, played their home games at the University of Dayton Arena and were members of the Atlantic 10 Conference. They finished the season 22–9, 11–5 in A-10 play. They fell in the semifinal round of the Atlantic 10 tournament, but received an at-large bid to the NCAA tournament. As No. 11 seed in the West region, the Flyers were beaten by No. 6 seed and eventual regional runner-up Purdue.

== Roster ==
1999–2000 Dayton Flyers men's basketball team
Players
Coaches

Pos.	#	Name	Height	Weight	Year	Previous school	Hometown
G	12	Tony Stanley	6 ft 4 in (1.93 m)	—	Jr
F	23	Yuanta Holland	6 ft 7 in (2.01 m)	225 lb (102 kg)	Jr		Dayton, Ohio
C	34	Mark Ashman	6 ft 10 in (2.08 m)	—	Jr

Head coach

- Oliver Purnell (Old Dominion)

Assistant coach(es)

- Ron Jirsa (Gettysburg)
- Frank Smith (Old Dominion)
- Josh Postorino (Dayton)

Legend

- (C) Team captain
- (S) Suspended
- (I) Ineligible
- (W) Walk-on
- Injured
- Current redshirt

Roster

== Schedule and results ==
Date time, TV	Rank^{#}	Opponent^{#}	Result	Record	Site (attendance) city, state
Non-conference regular season
Nov 19, 1999*		at New Mexico	W 70–57	1–0	The Pit; Albuquerque, New Mexico
Nov 20, 1999*		vs. Samford	W 65–63	2–0	The Pit; Albuquerque, New Mexico
Nov 26, 1999*		Mount St. Mary's	W 73–51	3–0	University of Dayton Arena; Dayton, Ohio
Nov 29, 1999*		vs. No. 13 Kentucky	W 68–66	4–0	Riverfront Coliseum; Cincinnati, Ohio
Dec 1, 1999*		UMBC	W 83–60	5–0	University of Dayton Arena; Dayton, Ohio
Dec 4, 1999*		Winthrop	W 76–49	6–0	University of Dayton Arena; Dayton, Ohio
Dec 7, 1999*		at Marquette	W 63–60	7–0	Bradley Center; Milwaukee, Wisconsin
Dec 11, 1999*		Coastal Carolina	W 104–79	8–0	University of Dayton Arena; Dayton, Ohio
Dec 18, 1999*		at Cleveland State	L 60–75	8–1	CSU Convocation Center; Cleveland, Ohio
Dec 21, 1999*		Texas A&M	W 81–68	9–1	University of Dayton Arena; Dayton, Ohio
Dec 23, 1999*		Saint Louis	L 74–83	9–2	University of Dayton Arena; Dayton, Ohio
Dec 29, 1999*		Miami (OH)	W 78–70	10–2	University of Dayton Arena; Dayton, Ohio
Atlantic 10 regular season
Jan 9, 2000		Virginia Tech	W 62–50	11–2 (1–0)	University of Dayton Arena; Dayton, Ohio
Jan 11, 2000		Xavier	W 76–72	12–2 (2–0)	University of Dayton Arena; Dayton, Ohio
Jan 15, 2000		at Fordham	L 61–70	12–3 (2–1)	Rose Hill Gym; Bronx, New York
Jan 20, 2000		at UMass	W 57–52	13–3 (3–1)	Mullins Center; Amherst, Massachusetts
Jan 22, 2000		George Washington	W 83–76	14–3 (4–1)	University of Dayton Arena; Dayton, Ohio
Jan 25, 2000		La Salle	W 69–60	15–3 (5–1)	University of Dayton Arena; Dayton, Ohio
Jan 29, 2000		at Saint Joseph's	W 66–62	16–3 (6–1)	Hagan Arena; Philadelphia, Pennsylvania
Feb 2, 2000		at Xavier	L 64–65 ^{OT}	16–4 (6–2)	Cincinnati Gardens; Cincinnati, Ohio
Feb 6, 2000		Duquesne	W 93–77	17–4 (7–2)	University of Dayton Arena; Dayton, Ohio
Feb 9, 2000		at George Washington	L 90–95	17–5 (7–3)	Charles E. Smith Center; Washington, D.C.
Feb 12, 2000		St. Bonaventure	W 68–64	18–5 (8–3)	University of Dayton Arena; Dayton, Ohio
Feb 17, 2000		No. 15 Temple	L 58–64	18–6 (8–4)	University of Dayton Arena; Dayton, Ohio
Feb 23, 2000		at La Salle	W 71–64	19–6 (9–4)	Tom Gola Arena; Philadelphia, Pennsylvania
Feb 26, 2000		Rhode Island	W 77–51	20–6 (10–4)	University of Dayton Arena; Dayton, Ohio
Mar 2, 2000		at Duquesne	W 94–64	21–6 (11–4)	A.J. Palumbo Center; Pittsburgh, Pennsylvania
Mar 4, 2000		at Virginia Tech	L 52–64	21–7 (11–5)	Cassell Coliseum; Blacksburg, Virginia
Atlantic 10 tournament
Mar 9, 2000*		at Saint Joseph's; Quarterfinals	W 67–64	22–7	The Spectrum; Philadelphia, Pennsylvania
Mar 10, 2000*		vs. St. Bonaventure; Semifinals	L 50–56	22–8	The Spectrum; Philadelphia, Pennsylvania
NCAA tournament
Mar 16, 2000*	(11 W)	vs. (6 W) No. 25 Purdue; First Round	L 61–62	22–9	McKale Center; Tucson, Arizona
*Non-conference game. ^{#}Rankings from AP poll. (#) Tournament seedings in parentheses. W=West. All times are in Eastern Time.
