= 1999–2000 Temple Owls men's basketball team =

American college basketball season

1999–00 Temple Owls men's basketball

Atlantic 10 Season & tournament champions

NCAA tournament, Second round
- Conference: Atlantic 10 Conference

Ranking
- Coaches: No. 10
- AP: No. 5
- Record: 27–6 (14–2 A-10)
- Head coach: John Chaney (18th season)
- Assistant coach: Dan Leibovitz (4th season)
- Home arena: The Apollo of Temple / Liacouras Center

1999–2000 Atlantic 10 men's basketball standings
	Conf.				Overall
Team	W		L	PCT	W		L	PCT
East
No. 5 Temple †	14	–	2	.875	27	–	6	.818
St. Bonaventure	11	–	5	.688	21	–	10	.677
UMass	9	–	7	.563	17	–	16	.515
Fordham	7	–	9	.438	14	–	15	.483
Saint Joseph's	7	–	9	.438	13	–	16	.448
Rhode Island	2	–	14	.125	5	–	25	.167
West
Dayton	11	–	5	.688	22	–	9	.710
Xavier	9	–	7	.563	21	–	12	.636
George Washington	9	–	7	.563	15	–	15	.500
Virginia Tech	8	–	8	.500	16	–	15	.516
La Salle	5	–	11	.313	11	–	17	.393
Duquesne	4	–	12	.250	9	–	20	.310
† 2000 Atlantic 10 Tournament winner Rankings from AP Poll

The 1999–2000 Temple Owls men's basketball team represented Temple University in the 1999–00 NCAA Division I men's basketball season. They were led by head coach John Chaney in his 18th year. The Owls were undefeated at home, both in Atlantic-10 games and overall. After winning the Atlantic-10 Tournament, the Owls received an automatic bid to the NCAA tournament and were seeded #2 in the East Region. They played at the First Niagara Center and defeated the Lafayette Leopards 73–47 in the first round. However, in the second round the Owls were upset by 10th seeded Seton Hall in a close overtime game 67–65.

== Roster ==
1999–2000 Temple Owls men's basketball team
Players
Coaches

Pos.	#	Name	Height	Weight	Year	Hometown
G	4	Pepe Sánchez	6 ft 4 in (1.93 m)	—	Sr	Bahía Blanca, Argentina
G	14	Lynn Greer	6 ft 1 in (1.85 m)	175 lb (79 kg)	So	Philadelphia, Pennsylvania
G/F	25	Mark Karcher	6 ft 5 in (1.96 m)	210 lb (95 kg)	Sr	Baltimore, Maryland
F/C	32	Lamont Barnes	6 ft 10 in (2.08 m)	230 lb (104 kg)	Sr	Hopkinsville, Kentucky

Head coach

- John Chaney

Assistant coach(es)

Legend

- (C) Team captain
- (S) Suspended
- (I) Ineligible
- (W) Walk-on
- Injured
- Current redshirt

Roster

== Schedule and results ==
Date time, TV	Rank^{#}	Opponent^{#}	Result	Record	Site city, state
Regular season
November 21, 1999*	No. 6	Miami (OH)	W 60–47	1–0	The Apollo of Temple; Philadelphia, Pennsylvania
November 26, 1999*	No. 5	vs. Indiana	L 59–67	1–1	Springfield Civic Center; Springfield, Massachusetts
November 29, 1999*	No. 5	at Florida State	W 69–58	2–1	Donald L. Tucker Center; Tallahassee, Florida
December 4, 1999*	No. 10	at Wake Forest	L 72–77	2–2	Lawrence Joel Coliseum; Winston-Salem, North Carolina
December 8, 1999*	No. 19	vs. No. 24 Gonzaga	W 64–48	3–2	United Center; Chicago, Illinois
December 15, 1999*	No. 17	Villanova; Philadelphia Big 5	W 69–66	4–2	The Apollo of Temple; Philadelphia, Pennsylvania
December 22, 1999*	No. 19	Penn State	W 66–51	5–2	The Apollo of Temple; Philadelphia, Pennsylvania
December 27, 1999*	No. 19	at Cleveland State	W 79–66	6–2	CSU Convocation Center; Cleveland, Ohio
December 29, 1999*	No. 17	at Wisconsin	L 44–62	6–3	Kohl Center; Madison, Wisconsin
January 5, 2000		Rhode Island	W 88-45	7–3 (1–0)	The Apollo of Temple; Philadelphia, Pennsylvania
January 8, 2000		St. Joseph's; Philadelphia Big 5	W 64-51	8–3 (2–0)	The Apollo of Temple; Philadelphia, Pennsylvania
January 12, 2000	No. 23	at Fordham	W 78–61	9–3 (3–0)	Rose Hill Gymnasium; Bronx, New York
January 15, 2000	No. 23	at St. Bonaventure	L 56–57	9–4 (3–1)	Reilly Center; St. Bonaventure, New York
January 18, 2000		at La Salle; Philadelphia Big 5	W 72–50	10–4 (4–1)	Tom Gola Arena; Philadelphia, Pennsylvania
January 20, 2000*		Penn; Philadelphia Big 5	W 44–40	11–4	The Apollo of Temple; Philadelphia, Pennsylvania
January 22, 2000		Virginia Tech	W 66–46	12–4 (5–1)	The Apollo of Temple; Philadelphia, Pennsylvania
January 25, 2000	No. 23	Xavier	W 59–40	13–4 (6–1)	The Apollo of Temple; Philadelphia, Pennsylvania
January 29, 2000	No. 23	Duquesne	W 81–37	14–4 (7–1)	The Apollo of Temple; Philadelphia, Pennsylvania
February 1, 2020	No. 21	at Massachusetts	W 75–48	15–4 (8–1)	Mullins Center; Amherst, Massachusetts
February 5, 2000	No. 21	at Rhode Island	W 74–40	16–4 (9–1)	Keaney Gymnasium; Kingston, Rhode Island
February 10, 2000	No. 19	Fordham	W 75–61	17–4 (10–1)	The Apollo of Temple; Philadelphia, Pennsylvania
February 13, 2000*	No. 19	No. 23 Maryland	W 73–65	18–4	Liacouras Center; Philadelphia, Pennsylvania
February 17, 2000	No. 15	at Dayton	W 64–58	19–4 (11–1)	University of Dayton Arena; Dayton, Ohio
February 20, 2000*	No. 15	at No. 1 Cincinnati	W 77–69	20–4	Fifth Third Arena; Cincinnati, Ohio
February 24, 2000	No. 8	St. Bonaventure	W 75–58	21–4 (12–1)	Liacouras Center; Philadelphia, Pennsylvania
February 26, 2000	No. 8	Massachusetts	W 72–54	22–4 (13–1)	Liacouras Center; Philadelphia, Pennsylvania
February 29, 2000	No. 5	at St. Joseph's; Philadelphia Big 5	L 59–62	22–5 (13–2)	The Palestra; Philadelphia, Pennsylvania
March 4, 2000	No. 5	at George Washington	W 98–67	23–5 (14–2)	Charles E. Smith Center; Washington, D.C.
Atlantic 10 tournament
March 9, 2000	No. 6	vs. Virginia Tech; Atlantic 10 Tournament quarterfinals	W 71–52	24–5	First Union Spectrum; Philadelphia, Pennsylvania
March 10, 2000	No. 6	vs. Massachusetts; Atlantic 10 Tournament semifinals	W 54–47	25–5	First Union Spectrom; Philadelphia, Pennsylvania
March 11, 2000	No. 6	vs. St. Bonaventure; Atlantic 10 Tournament finals	W 65–44	26–5	First Union Spectrum; Philadelphia, Pennsylvania
NCAA tournament
March 17, 2000*	(2 E) No. 5	vs. (15 E) Lafayette; First Round	W 73–47	27–5	HSBC Arena; Buffalo, New York
March 19, 2000	(2 E) No. 5	vs. (10 E) Seton Hall; Second Round	L 65–67 ^{OT}	27–6	HSBC Arena; Buffalo, New York
*Non-conference game. ^{#}Rankings from AP Poll. (#) Tournament seedings in parentheses.

== Awards and honors ==
- Pepe Sanchez – Atlantic 10 Player of the Year
