= 1999–2000 Arizona Wildcats men's basketball team =

American college basketball season

1999–2000 Arizona Wildcats men's basketball

NIT Season Tip-Off Champions Pac-10 Regular-Season Co-Champions

NCAA tournament, Round of 32
- Conference: Pacific-10 Conference

Ranking
- Coaches: No. 8
- AP: No. 4
- Record: 27–7 (15–3 Pac-10)
- Head coach: Lute Olson (17th season)
- Assistant coaches: Jim Rosborough (11th season); Rodney Tention (3rd season)
- Home arena: McKale Center

1999–2000 Pacific-10 Conference men's basketball standings
| | Conf. | | | | Overall |
| Team | W | | L | PCT | W | | L | PCT |
|---|---|---|---|---|---|---|---|---|
| No. 8 Arizona | 15 | – | 3 | .833 | 27 | – | 7 | .794 |
| No. 5 Stanford | 15 | – | 3 | .833 | 27 | – | 4 | .871 |
| Oregon | 13 | – | 5 | .722 | 22 | – | 8 | .733 |
| No. 23 UCLA | 10 | – | 8 | .556 | 21 | – | 12 | .636 |
| Arizona State | 10 | – | 8 | .556 | 18 | – | 12 | .600 |
| USC | 9 | – | 9 | .500 | 16 | – | 14 | .533 |
| California | 7 | – | 11 | .389 | 16 | – | 14 | .533 |
| Oregon State | 5 | – | 13 | .278 | 13 | – | 16 | .448 |
| Washington | 5 | – | 13 | .278 | 10 | – | 20 | .333 |
| Washington State | 1 | – | 17 | .056 | 6 | – | 22 | .214 |
As of July 26, 2011; Rankings from AP Poll

The 1999–2000 Arizona Wildcats men's basketball team represented the University of Arizona in the 1999–2000 NCAA Division I men's basketball season. The head coach was Lute Olson. The team played its home games in the McKale Center in Tucson, Arizona, and was a member of the Pacific-10 Conference. The Wildcats finished the season in first place in the Pacific-10 conference with a 15–3 record. Arizona reached the Second Round in the 2000 NCAA Division I men's basketball tournament, losing to Wisconsin 66–59 and finishing the season with a 27–7 record.

== Roster ==
2000–01 Arizona Wildcats men's basketball team
Players
Coaches

| Pos. | # | Name | Height | Weight | Year | Hometown |
|---|---|---|---|---|---|---|
| G | 0 | Gilbert Arenas | 6 ft 3 in (1.91 m) | 188 lb (85 kg) | Fr | North Hollywood, California |
| F | 2 | Luke Recker | 6 ft 6 in (1.98 m) | 200 lb (91 kg) | Jr | Auburn, Indiana |
| C | 3 | Loren Woods | 7 ft 1 in (2.16 m) | 244 lb (111 kg) | Jr | St. Louis, Missouri |
| F | 4 | Luke Walton | 6 ft 8 in (2.03 m) | 233 lb (106 kg) | Fr | San Diego, California |
| G | 5 | Ruben Douglas | 6 ft 4 in (1.93 m) | 190 lb (86 kg) | So | Altadena, California |
| G | 12 | Josh Pastner | 6 ft 0 in (1.83 m) | 180 lb (82 kg) | Sr | Glen Dale, West Virginia |
| F | 14 | Mike Schwertley | 6 ft 5 in (1.96 m) | 224 lb (102 kg) | Fr | Phoenix, Arizona |
| G | 15 | John Ash | 5 ft 11 in (1.8 m) | 179 lb (81 kg) | Jr | Tucson, Arizona |
| F | 21 | Michael Wright | 6 ft 7 in (2.01 m) | 238 lb (108 kg) | So | Chicago, Illinois |
| G | 22 | Jason Gardner | 5 ft 10 in (1.78 m) | 181 lb (82 kg) | Fr | Indianapolis, Indiana |
| G | 23 | Lamont Frazier | 6 ft 2 in (1.88 m) | 182 lb (83 kg) | Jr | Los Angeles, California |
| G | 24 | Russell Harris | 5 ft 11 in (1.8 m) | 165 lb (75 kg) | Fr | Mundelein, Illinois |
| F | 30 | Justin Wessel | 6 ft 8 in (2.03 m) | 240 lb (109 kg) | Jr | Cedar Rapids, Iowa |
| F | 35 | Rick Anderson | 6 ft 9 in (2.06 m) | 213 lb (97 kg) | So | Long Beach, California |
| F | 44 | Richard Jefferson | 6 ft 7 in (2.01 m) | 222 lb (101 kg) | So | Phoenix, Arizona |
| C | 54 | Robertas Javtokas | 6 ft 10 in (2.08 m) | 230 lb (104 kg) | Fr | Šiauliai, Lithuania |

Head coach

- Lute Olson (Augsburg)

Assistant coach(es)

- Jim Rosborough (Iowa)
- Rodney Tention (San Francisco)
- Jay John (Arizona)

Legend

- (C) Team captain
- (S) Suspended
- (I) Ineligible
- (W) Walk-on
- Injured
- Current redshirt

Roster

== Schedule ==
| Date time, TV | Rank^{#} | Opponent^{#} | Result | Record | Site (attendance) city, state |
Regular season
| Nov. 16, 1999* | No. 10 | Kansas State | W 88–69 | 1–0 | McKale Center; Tucson, Arizona |
| Nov. 19, 1999* | No. 10 | New Mexico State | W 84–60 | 2–0 | McKale Center; Tucson, Arizona |
| Nov. 24, 1999* | No. 8 | vs. Notre Dame; NIT Season Tip-Off Semifinal | W 76–60 | 3–0 | Madison Square Garden; New York, New York |
| Nov. 26, 1999* | No. 8 | vs. No. 11 Kentucky; NIT Season Tip-Off Championship | W 63–51 | 4–0 | Madison Square Garden; New York, New York |
| Dec. 1, 1999* | No. 4 | Brigham Young | W 86–62 | 5–0 | McKale Center; Tucson, Arizona |
| Dec. 4, 1999* | No. 4 | at No. 9 Texas | W 88–81 | 6–0 | Frank Erwin Center; Austin, Texas |
| Dec. 7, 1999* | No. 2 | vs. No. 6 Connecticut; Great Eight Basketball Classic | L 69–78 | 6–1 | United Center; Chicago, Illinois |
| Dec. 11, 1999*; CBS | No. 2 | No. 4 Michigan State | W 79–68 | 7–1 | McKale Center; Tucson, Arizona |
| Dec. 13, 1999* | No. 2 | IUPUI | W 70–41 | 8–1 | McKale Center; Tucson, Arizona |
| Dec. 18, 1999* | No. 4 | vs. Nebraska | W 80–59 | 9–1 | Thomas & Mack Center; Paradise, Nevada |
| Dec. 21, 1999* | No. 3 | New Mexico | L 68–70 | 9–2 | McKale Center; Tucson, Arizona |
| Dec. 28, 1999* | No. 5 | North Carolina-Wilmington | W 66–51 | 10–2 | McKale Center; Tucson, Arizona |
| Dec. 30, 1999* | No. 5 | Delaware | W 89–77 | 11–2 | McKale Center; Tucson, Arizona |
| Jan. 6, 2000 | No. 5 | at California | W 65–61 | 12–2 (1–0) | Haas Pavilion; Berkeley, California |
| Jan. 8, 2000 | No. 5 | at No. 1 Stanford | W 68–65 | 13–2 (2–0) | Maples Pavilion; Stanford, California |
| Jan. 13, 2000 | No. 2 | Washington State | W 80–75 | 14–2 (3–0) | McKale Center; Tucson, Arizona |
| Jan. 15, 2000 | No. 2 | Washington | W 69–62 | 15–2 (4–0) | McKale Center; Tucson, Arizona |
| Jan. 20, 2000 | No. 2 | at No. 25 UCLA; Rivalry | W 76–61 | 16–2 (5–0) | Pauley Pavilion; Los Angeles, California |
| Jan. 22, 2000 | No. 2 | at Southern California | L 72–80 | 16–3 (5–1) | Los Angeles Memorial Sports Arena; Los Angeles, California |
| Jan. 26, 2000 | No. 5 | at Arizona State; Rivalry | W 82–55 | 17–3 (6–1) | Wells Fargo Arena; Tempe, Arizona |
| Jan. 29, 2000* | No. 5 | at Louisiana State | L 60–86 | 17–4 | Maravich Assembly Center; Baton Rouge, Louisiana |
| Feb. 3, 2000 | No. 9 | No. 23 Oregon | W 77–71 | 18–4 (7–1) | McKale Center; Tucson, Arizona |
| Feb. 5, 2000 | No. 9 | at Oregon State | W 90–73 | 19–4 (8–1) | McKale Center; Tucson, Arizona |
| Feb. 10, 2000 | No. 7 | at Washington | W 65–56 | 20–4 (9–1) | KeyArena; Seattle, Washington |
| Feb. 12, 2000 | No. 7 | Washington State | W 73–50 | 21–4 (10–1) | Beasley Coliseum; Pullman, Washington |
| Feb. 17, 2000 | No. 4 | Southern California | W 92–85 | 22–4 (11–1) | McKale Center; Tucson, Arizona |
| Feb. 19, 2000 | No. 4 | UCLA; Rivalry | W 99–84 | 23–4 (12–1) | McKale Center; Tucson, Arizona |
| Feb. 26, 2000 | No. 4 | Arizona State; Rivalry | W 89–82 | 24–4 (13–1) | McKale Center; Tucson, Arizona |
| Mar. 2, 2000 | No. 3 | at Oregon State | L 69–70 ^{OT} | 24–5 (13–2) | Gill Coliseum; Corvallis, Oregon |
| Mar. 4, 2000 | No. 3 | at Oregon | L 81–86 | 24–6 (13–3) | McArthur Court; Eugene, Oregon |
| Mar. 9, 2000 | No. 9 | No. 2 Stanford | W 86–81 | 25–6 (14–3) | McKale Center; Tucson, Arizona |
| Mar. 11, 2000 | No. 9 | California | W 70–61 | 26–6 (15–3) | McKale Center; Tucson, Arizona |
NCAA tournament
| Mar. 16, 2000*; CBS | (1 W) | vs. (16 W) Jackson State; First Round | W 71–47 | 27–6 | Jon M. Huntsman Center; Salt Lake City, Utah |
| Mar. 18, 2000*; CBS | (1 W) | vs. (8 W) Wisconsin; Second Round | L 59–66 | 27–7 | John M. Huntsman Center; Salt Lake City, Utah |
*Non-conference game. ^{#}Rankings from AP Poll. (#) Tournament seedings in parentheses. All times are in Mountain Time.

=== NCAA Division I tournament ===
- West
  - Arizona (#1 seed) 71, Jackson State 47
  - Arizona 59, Wisconsin 66
