= 1999–2000 Wake Forest Demon Deacons men's basketball team =

American college basketball season

1999–2000 Wake Forest Demon Deacons men's basketball

NIT champions
- Conference: Atlantic Coast Conference
- Record: 22–14 (7–9 ACC)
- Head coach: Dave Odom (11th season)
- Assistant coach: Frank Haith (3rd season)
- Home arena: LJVM Coliseum

1999–2000 ACC men's basketball standings
	Conf.				Overall
Team	W		L	PCT	W		L	PCT
No. 1 Duke †	15	–	1	.938	29	–	5	.853
No. 17 Maryland	11	–	5	.688	25	–	10	.714
Virginia	9	–	7	.563	19	–	12	.613
North Carolina	9	–	7	.563	22	–	14	.611
Wake Forest	7	–	9	.438	22	–	14	.611
NC State	6	–	10	.375	20	–	14	.588
Florida State	5	–	11	.313	13	–	17	.433
Georgia Tech	5	–	11	.313	13	–	17	.433
Clemson	4	–	12	.250	10	–	20	.333
† 2000 ACC tournament winner Rankings from AP Poll

The 1999–2000 Wake Forest Demon Deacons men's basketball team represented Wake Forest University as a member of the Atlantic Coast Conference during the 1999–2000 NCAA Division I men's basketball season. Led by head coach Dave Odom, the team played their home games at Lawrence Joel Veterans Memorial Coliseum in Winston-Salem, North Carolina. The Demon Deacons finished in fifth in the ACC regular season standings.

== Roster ==
1999–2000 Wake Forest Demon Deacons men's basketball team
Players
Coaches

Pos.	#	Name	Height	Weight	Year	Previous school	Hometown
F	5	Josh Howard	6 ft 7 in (2.01 m)	205 lb (93 kg)	Fr	Hargrave Military Academy	Winston-Salem, North Carolina
F	25	Darius Songaila	6 ft 9 in (2.06 m)	248 lb (112 kg)	So

Head coach

- Dave Odom

Assistant coach(es)

- Frank Haith

Legend

- (C) Team captain
- (S) Suspended
- (I) Ineligible
- (W) Walk-on
- Injured
- Current redshirt

Roster

== Schedule and results ==
Date time, TV	Rank^{#}	Opponent^{#}	Result	Record	Site city, state
Regular Season
Nov 20, 1999*; 8:00 p.m.		Campbell	W 87–45	1–0	LJVM Coliseum; Winston-Salem, North Carolina
Nov 22, 1999*; 7:30 p.m.		at Navy	W 90–55	2–0	Navy–Marine Corps Memorial Stadium; Annapolis, Maryland
Nov 27, 1999*; 7:30 p.m.		Maryland Eastern Shore	W 85–60	3–0	LJVM Coliseum; Winston-Salem, North Carolina
Nov 30, 1999*; 7:00 p.m.		Wisconsin; ACC–Big Ten Challenge	W 67–48	4–0	LJVM Coliseum; Winston-Salem, North Carolina
Dec 4, 1999*; 12:00 p.m.		No. 10 Temple	W 77–72	5–0	LJVM Coliseum; Winston-Salem, North Carolina
Dec 11, 1999*; 2:30 p.m.		at Georgia; Scottish Rite Classic	L 67–68	5–1	Atlanta, Georgia
Dec 15, 1999*; 8:00 p.m.		UNC Greensboro	W 85–60	6–1	LJVM Coliseum; Winston-Salem, North Carolina
Dec 17, 1999*; 7:30 p.m.		High Point	W 79–35	7–1	LJVM Coliseum; Winston-Salem, North Carolina
Dec 20, 1999*; 7:00 p.m.		at Arkansas	W 70–64	8–1	Bud Walton Arena; Fayetteville, Arkansas
Dec 28, 1999*; 12:30 a.m.	No. 19	vs. Oregon; Outrigger Hotel Rainbow Classic	L 66–67	8–2	Stan Sheriff Center; Honolulu, Hawaii
Dec 29, 1999*; 6:30 p.m.	No. 19	vs. Ohio; Outrigger Hotel Rainbow Classic	W 84–78 ^{2OT}	9–2	Stan Sheriff Center (839); Honolulu, Hawaii
Dec 30, 1999*; 6:30 p.m.		vs. Villanova; Outrigger Hotel Rainbow Classic	L 57–70	9–3	Stan Sheriff Center; Honolulu, Hawaii
Jan 4, 2000; 6:00 p.m.		Florida State	L 64–66	9–4 (0–1)	LJVM Coliseum; Winston-Salem, North Carolina
Jan 9, 2000		at Clemson	W 67–53	10–4 (1–1)	Littlejohn Coliseum; Clemson, South Carolina
Jan 12, 2000; 9:00 p.m.		North Carolina	W 66–57	11–4 (2–1)	LJVM Coliseum; Winston-Salem, North Carolina
Jan 16, 2000; 1:30 p.m.		NC State	L 51–60	11–5 (2–2)	Entertainment and Sports Arena; Raleigh, North Carolina
Jan 19, 2000; 9:00 p.m.		at No. 24 Maryland	L 51–73	11–6 (2–3)	Cole Field House (14,319); College Park, Maryland
Jan 22, 2000; 12:00 p.m.		No. 5 Duke	L 61–75	11–7 (2–4)	LJVM Coliseum; Winston-Salem, North Carolina
Jan 27, 2000; 8:00 p.m.		at Georgia Tech	W 60–46	12–7 (3–4)	Alexander Memorial Coliseum; Atlanta, Georgia
Jan 30, 2000; 1:00 p.m., Raycom		Virginia	L 67–76	12–8 (3–5)	LJVM Coliseum (4,800); Winston-Salem, North Carolina
Feb 2, 2000*; 7:00 p.m.		at Davidson	L 49–54	12–9	John M. Belk Arena; Davidson, North Carolina
Feb 5, 2000; 1:00 p.m.		at Florida State	L 61–66	12–10 (3–6)	Tallahassee-Leon County Civic Center; Tallahassee, Florida
Feb 8, 2000; 7:00 p.m.		Clemson	W 79–63	13–10 (4–6)	LJVM Coliseum; Winston-Salem, North Carolina
Feb 12, 2000; 1:30 p.m.		at North Carolina	L 64–87	13–11 (4–7)	Dean Smith Center; Chapel Hill, North Carolina
Feb 15, 2000; 8:00 p.m.		NC State	W 71–53	14–11 (5–7)	LJVM Coliseum; Winston-Salem, North Carolina
Feb 19, 2000; 4:00 p.m.		No. 22 Maryland	L 67–73	14–12 (5–8)	LJVM Coliseum (12,425); Winston-Salem, North Carolina
Feb 22, 2000; 8:00 p.m.		at No. 2 Duke	L 78–96	14–13 (5–9)	Cameron Indoor Stadium; Durham, North Carolina
Feb 27, 2000; 2:00 p.m.		Georgia Tech	L 67–73	14–13 (5–9)	LJVM Coliseum; Winston-Salem, North Carolina
Mar 2, 2000; 7:00 p.m., ESPN2	No. 17	at Virginia	W 80–75	15–13 (6–9)	University Hall (8,176); Charlottesville, Virginia
ACC Tournament
Mar 10, 2000*; 12:00 p.m.	(5)	vs. (4) North Carolina; Quarterfinals	W 58–52	16–13	Independence Arena; Charlotte, North Carolina
Mar 11, 2000*	(5)	vs. (1) No. 3 Duke; Semifinals	L 73–82	16–14	Independence Arena; Charlotte, North Carolina
NIT Tournament
Mar 14, 2000*; 7:30 p.m.		at Vanderbilt; First round	W 83–68	17–14	Memorial Gymnasium; Nashville, Tennessee
Mar 21, 2000*; 7:30 p.m.		New Mexico; Second round	W 72–65	18–14	LJVM Coliseum; Winston-Salem, North Carolina
Mar 24, 2000*; 7:30 p.m.		vs. California; Third round	W 76–59	19–14	Fleming Gymnasium; Greensboro, North Carolina
Mar 28, 2000*		vs. NC State; Final Four	W 62–59	20–14	Madison Square Garden; New York, New York
Mar 30, 2000*; 7:00 p.m.		vs. Notre Dame; Championship game	W 71–61	21–14	Madison Square Garden; New York, New York
*Non-conference game. ^{#}Rankings from AP Poll. (#) Tournament seedings in parentheses. All times are in Eastern Standard Time.
