= 1999–2000 Virginia Cavaliers men's basketball team =

American college basketball season

1999–2000 Virginia Cavaliers men's basketball

NIT, First Round
- Conference: Atlantic Coast Conference
- Record: 19–12 (9–7 ACC)
- Head coach: Pete Gillen (2nd season)
- Assistant coaches: Walt Fuller (2nd season); Scot Shepherd (2nd season); Tom Herrion (2nd season)
- Home arena: University Hall

1999–2000 ACC men's basketball standings
	Conf.				Overall
Team	W		L	PCT	W		L	PCT
No. 1 Duke †	15	–	1	.938	29	–	5	.853
No. 17 Maryland	11	–	5	.688	25	–	10	.714
Virginia	9	–	7	.563	19	–	12	.613
North Carolina	9	–	7	.563	22	–	14	.611
Wake Forest	7	–	9	.438	22	–	14	.611
NC State	6	–	10	.375	20	–	14	.588
Florida State	5	–	11	.313	13	–	17	.433
Georgia Tech	5	–	11	.313	13	–	17	.433
Clemson	4	–	12	.250	10	–	20	.333
† 2000 ACC tournament winner Rankings from AP Poll

The 1999–2000 Virginia Cavaliers men's basketball team represented the University of Virginia during the 1999–2000 NCAA Division I men's basketball season. The team was led by second-year head coach Pete Gillen, and played their home games at University Hall in Charlottesville, Virginia as members of the Atlantic Coast Conference.

== Last season ==
The Cavaliers had a record of 19–12.

== Roster ==
1999–2000 Virginia Cavaliers men's basketball team
Players
Coaches

Pos.	#	Name	Height	Weight	Year	Previous school	Hometown
F	4	Stephane Dondon	6 ft 8 in (2.03 m)	239 lb (108 kg)	Jr	Lycée Robert Schuman	Toulouse
G	5	Jason Dowling	6 ft 2 in (1.88 m)	191 lb (87 kg)	So	Xaverian HS	Brooklyn, New York
G	10	Chesley Watson	6 ft 2 in (1.88 m)	201 lb (91 kg)	Jr	East Hall HS	Gainesville, Georgia
G	11	Majestic Mapp	6 ft 1 in (1.85 m)	185 lb (84 kg)	Fr	St. Raymond HS	Harlem, New York
G	12	Keith Friel	6 ft 4 in (1.93 m)	195 lb (88 kg)	Jr	Oyster River HS	Durham, New Hampshire
G	13	Donald Hand (C)	5 ft 11 in (1.8 m)	178 lb (81 kg)	Jr	Paterson Catholic HS	Paterson, New Jersey
G	21	Roger Mason, Jr.	6 ft 4 in (1.93 m)	195 lb (88 kg)	Fr	Good Counsel HS	Silver Spring, Maryland
G	22	Josh Hare	6 ft 2 in (1.88 m)	205 lb (93 kg)	Jr	Rockville HS	Vernon, Connecticut
G/F	24	Willie Dersch (C)	6 ft 6 in (1.98 m)	210 lb (95 kg)	Sr	Holy Cross HS	Floral Park, New York
F/C	30	Jason Rogers	6 ft 10 in (2.08 m)	240 lb (109 kg)	Fr	Robert E. Lee HS	Staunton, Virginia
G/F	31	Adam Hall	6 ft 5 in (1.96 m)	198 lb (90 kg)	So	Katy HS	Katy, Texas
F	32	Cade Lemcke	6 ft 6 in (1.98 m)	187 lb (85 kg)	So	McQuaid Jesuit HS	Hilton, New York
F	33	Chris Williams	6 ft 6 in (1.98 m)	198 lb (90 kg)	So	Minor HS	Birmingham, Alabama
F/C	35	Travis Watson	6 ft 7 in (2.01 m)	245 lb (111 kg)	Fr	Oak Hill	Brookneal, Virginia
F/C	52	Colin Ducharme (C)	6 ft 9 in (2.06 m)	243 lb (110 kg)	RS Jr	Douglas S. Freeman HS	Richmond, Virginia

Head coach

- Pete Gillen (Fairfield)

Assistant coach(es)

- Tom Herrion (Merrimack)
- Walt Fuller (Drexel)
- Scott Shepherd (Robert Morris)

Legend

- (C) Team captain
- (S) Suspended
- (I) Ineligible
- (W) Walk-on
- Injured
- Current redshirt

== Schedule ==
Date time, TV	Opponent	Result	Record	Site (attendance) city, state
Exhibition games
Nov. 4*; 7:30 pm	Down Under Bandits	W 97–67		University Hall; Charlottesville, Virginia
Nov. 10*; 7:30 pm	Nantucket Nectars Naturals	W 94–70		University Hall; Charlottesville, Virginia
Regular season
Nov. 19*; 7:30 pm	Elon	W 97–66	1–0	University Hall (7,938); Charlottesville, Virginia
Nov. 21*; 7:00 pm	VMI	W 98–57	2–0	University Hall (7,468); Charlottesville, Virginia
Nov. 25*; 2:00 pm	vs. South Carolina; Puerto Rico Shootout	L 71–73	2–1	Eugenio Guerra Arena; Bayamón, PR
Nov. 26*; 11:30 am	vs. Providence; Puerto Rico Shootout	W 80–64	3–1	Eugenio Guerra Arena (101); Bayamón, PR
Nov. 27*; 1:30 pm	vs. Arizona State; Puerto Rico Shootout	W 70–64	4–1	Eugenio Guerra Arena; Bayamón, PR
Nov. 30*; 9:30 pm, ESPN2	at Minnesota; ACC–Big Ten Challenge	L 62–74	4–2	Williams Arena (13,485); Minneapolis
Dec. 4* Noon, RSN	at St. John's	L 63–85	4–3	Madison Square Garden (10,649); New York City
Dec. 8*; 7:30 pm	Loyola (Maryland)	W 98–67	5–3	University Hall (6,990); Charlottesville, Virginia
Dec. 10*; 6:00 pm, ESPN2	at Hampton	W 102–56	6–3	Hampton Convocation Center (4,420); Hampton, Virginia
Dec. 21*; 7:30 pm	at Richmond	W 69–65	7–3	Robins Center (9,054); Richmond, Virginia
Dec. 28*; 7:30 pm	Belmont	W 94–74	8–3	University Hall (7,532); Charlottesville, Virginia
Jan. 2*; 3:00 pm	No. 7 Dartmouth	W 89–50	9–3	University Hall (6,609); Charlottesville, Virginia
Jan. 5; 9:00 pm, ESPN	Duke	L 100–109 ^{OT}	9–4 (0–1)	University Hall (7,960); Charlottesville, Virginia
Jan. 8; 1:30 pm, Raycom	Georgia Tech	W 83–65	10–4 (1–1)	University Hall (7,247); Charlottesville, Virginia
Jan. 12; 7:30 pm	at NC State	L 62–65	10–5 (1–2)	Raleigh Entertainment & Sports Arena (19,027); Raleigh, North Carolina
Jan. 15; Noon, RSN	at No. 21 Clemson	W 98–91	11–5 (2–2)	Littlejohn Coliseum (8,000); Clemson, South Carolina
Jan. 18; 8:00 pm, Raycom	North Carolina	W 87–85	12–5 (3–2)	University Hall (8,394); Charlottesville, Virginia
Jan. 24*; 7:30 pm	vs. Virginia Tech	W 71–66 ^{OT}	13–5 (3–2)	Richmond Coliseum (7,221); Richmond, Virginia
Jan. 26; 9:00 pm, Raycom	Florida State	W 86–81	14–5 (4–2)	University Hall (8,205); Charlottesville, Virginia
Jan. 30; 1:00 pm, Raycom	at Wake Forest	W 76–67	15–5 (5–2)	LJVM Coliseum (4,800); Winston-Salem, North Carolina
Feb. 2; 8:00 pm, Raycom	at No. 3 Maryland	L 79–91	15–6 (5–3)	Cole Field House (14,500); College Park, Maryland
Feb. 5; 3:00 pm, ABC	at Duke	L 86–106	15–7 (5–4)	Cameron Indoor Stadium (9,314); Durham, North Carolina
Feb. 9; 7:30 pm	at Georgia Tech	L 47–68	15–8 (5–5)	Alexander Memorial Coliseum (6,171); Atlanta, Georgia
Feb. 12; 7:00 pm, ESPN	NC State	W 88–82	16–8 (6–5)	University Hall (8,175); Charlottesville, Virginia
Feb. 15; 8:00 pm, Raycom	Clemson	W 76–62	17–8 (7–5)	University Hall (7,318); Charlottesville, Virginia
Feb. 20; 4:00 pm, Raycom/ESPN2	at North Carolina	W 90–76	18–8 (8–5)	Dean Smith Center (21,572); Chapel Hill, North Carolina
Feb. 26; Noon, RSN	at Florida State	L 64–71	18–9 (8–6)	Tallahassee-Leon County Civic Center (6,643); Tallahassee, Florida
Mar. 2; 7:00 pm, ESPN2	No. 17 Wake Forest	L 75–80	18–10 (8–7)	University Hall (8,176); Charlottesville, Virginia
Mar. 4; 7:00 pm, ESPN	Maryland	W 89–87 ^{OT}	19–10 (9–7)	University Hall (8,457); Charlottesville, Virginia
ACC Tournament
Mar. 10; 7:00 pm	vs. NC State; ACC Quarterfinal	L 65–76	19–11	Charlotte Coliseum (23,895); Charlotte, North Carolina
National Invitation Tournament
Mar. 15*; 7:00 pm, ESPN	Georgetown; NIT First Round	L 111–115 ^{3OT}	19–12	University Hall (8,351); Charlottesville, Virginia
*Non-conference game. (#) Tournament seedings in parentheses. All times are in Eastern Time.
