= 1999–2000 St. Bonaventure Bonnies men's basketball team =

American college basketball season

1999–2000 St. Bonaventure Bonnies men's basketball
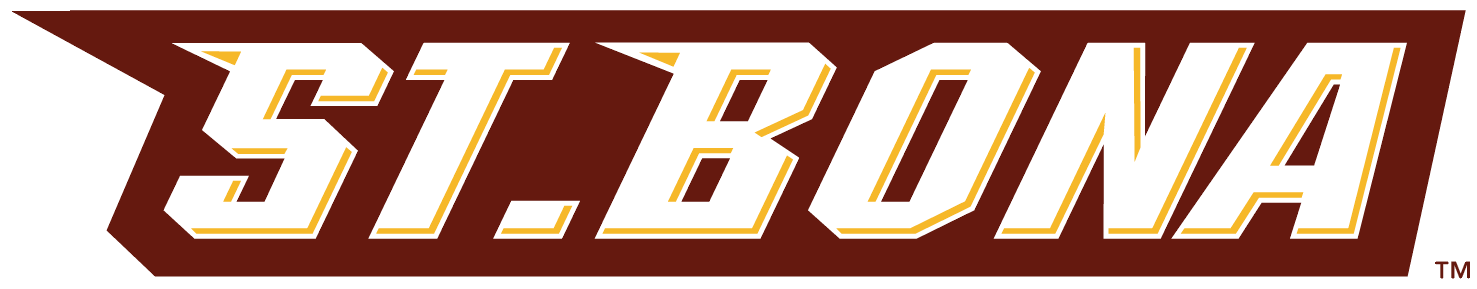

2000 NCAA tournament, first round
- Conference: Atlantic 10 Conference
- Record: 21–10 (11–5 A-10)
- Head coach: Jim Baron (8th season)
- Home arena: Reilly Center

1999–2000 Atlantic 10 men's basketball standings
	Conf.				Overall
Team	W		L	PCT	W		L	PCT
East
No. 5 Temple †	14	–	2	.875	27	–	6	.818
St. Bonaventure	11	–	5	.688	21	–	10	.677
UMass	9	–	7	.563	17	–	16	.515
Fordham	7	–	9	.438	14	–	15	.483
Saint Joseph's	7	–	9	.438	13	–	16	.448
Rhode Island	2	–	14	.125	5	–	25	.167
West
Dayton	11	–	5	.688	22	–	9	.710
Xavier	9	–	7	.563	21	–	12	.636
George Washington	9	–	7	.563	15	–	15	.500
Virginia Tech	8	–	8	.500	16	–	15	.516
La Salle	5	–	11	.313	11	–	17	.393
Duquesne	4	–	12	.250	9	–	20	.310
† 2000 Atlantic 10 Tournament winner Rankings from AP Poll

The 1999–2000 St. Bonaventure Bonnies men's basketball team represented St. Bonaventure University during the 1999–2000 NCAA Division I men's basketball season. The Bonnies, led by 8th-year head coach Jim Baron, played their home games at the Reilly Center and were members of the Atlantic 10 Conference. They finished the season 21–10, 11–5 in A-10 to finish in second place. They lost to Temple in the championship game of the A-10 Basketball tournament, but did earn an at-large bid to the 2000 NCAA tournament where they lost in the opening round to Kentucky, 85–80 in 2OT.

== Roster ==
1999–2000 St. Bonaventure Bonnies men's basketball team
Players
Coaches

Pos.	#	Name	Height	Weight	Year	Hometown
G	2	J. R. Bremer	6 ft 2 in (1.88 m)	195 lb (88 kg)	So	Cleveland, Ohio
G	4	Tim Winn	5 ft 9 in (1.75 m)	182 lb (83 kg)	Sr	Niagara Falls, New York
C	21	Caswell Cyrus	6 ft 10 in (2.08 m)	—	Sr

Head coach

- Jim Baron

Assistant coach(es)

Legend

- (C) Team captain
- (S) Suspended
- (I) Ineligible
- (W) Walk-on
- Injured
- Current redshirt

== Schedule and results ==
Date time, TV	Rank^{#}	Opponent^{#}	Result	Record	Site (attendance) city, state
Regular season
Nov 19, 1999*		Northeastern	W 65–61	1–0	Reilly Center; St. Bonaventure, New York
Nov 23, 1999*		at Charlotte	L 56–66	1–1	Dale F. Halton Arena; Charlotte, North Carolina
Nov 27, 1999*		vs. Colorado State	W 64–54	2–1	Firestone Fieldhouse; Malibu, California
Nov 28, 1999*		vs. Charlotte	W 75–66	3–1	Firestone Fieldhouse; Malibu, California
Dec 4, 1999*		USC	W 80–67	4–1	Reilly Center; St. Bonaventure, New York
Dec 11, 1999*		at Canisius	W 88–60	5–1	Koessler Athletic Center; Buffalo, New York
Dec 18, 1999*		at Florida International	W 78–70 ^{OT}	6–1	U.S. Century Bank Arena; Miami, Florida
Dec 21, 1999*		Kent State	L 60–73	6–2	Reilly Center; St. Bonaventure, New York
Dec 30, 1999*		Cleveland State	W 71–69	7–2	Reilly Center; St. Bonaventure, New York
Jan 2, 2000*		Niagara	W 84–71	8–2	Reilly Center; St. Bonaventure, New York
Jan 6, 2000		at UMass	W 70–60	9–2 (1–0)	Mullins Center; Amherst, Massachusetts
Jan 9, 2000		at La Salle	W 66–51	10–2 (2–0)	Tom Gola Arena; Philadelphia, Pennsylvania
Jan 12, 2000		Saint Joseph's	W 76–71	11–2 (3–0)	Reilly Center; St. Bonaventure, New York
Jan 15, 2000		No. 23 Temple	W 57–56	12–2 (4–0)	Reilly Center; St. Bonaventure, New York
Jan 22, 2000		at Fordham	L 60–66	12–3 (4–1)	Rose Hill Gym; Bronx, New York
Jan 26, 2000		at George Washington	L 72–75	12–4 (4–2)	Charles E. Smith Center; Washington, D.C.
Jan 29, 2000		Rhode Island	W 84–44	13–4 (5–2)	Reilly Center; St. Bonaventure, New York
Jan 31, 2000*		at Green Bay	L 58–65	13–5	Brown County Arena; Green Bay, Wisconsin
Feb 6, 2000		Fordham	L 68–73	13–6 (5–3)	Reilly Center; St. Bonaventure, New York
Feb 10, 2000		Virginia Tech	W 61–54	14–6 (6–3)	Reilly Center; St. Bonaventure, New York
Feb 12, 2000		at Dayton	L 64–68	14–7 (6–4)	University of Dayton Arena; Dayton, Ohio
Feb 16, 2000		at Rhode Island	W 64–54	15–7 (7–4)	Keaney Gymnasium; Kingston, Rhode Island
Feb 19, 2000		Duquesne	W 71–62	16–7 (8–4)	Reilly Center; St. Bonaventure, New York
Feb 24, 2000		at No. 8 Temple	L 58–75	16–8 (8–5)	Liacouras Center; Philadelphia, Pennsylvania
Feb 26, 2000		at Saint Joseph's	W 83–74	17–8 (9–5)	Hagan Arena; Philadelphia, Pennsylvania
Mar 1, 2000		Xavier	W 65–64	18–8 (10–5)	Reilly Center; St. Bonaventure, New York
Mar 4, 2000		UMass	W 86–69	19–8 (11–5)	Reilly Center; St. Bonaventure, New York
A-10 tournament
Mar 9, 2000*		vs. Xavier; Championship game	W 72–69	20–8	The Spectrum; Philadelphia, Pennsylvania
Mar 10, 2000*		vs. Dayton; Championship game	W 56–50	21–8	The Spectrum; Philadelphia, Pennsylvania
Mar 11, 2000*		at No. 6 Temple; Championship game	L 44–65	21–9	The Spectrum; Philadelphia, Pennsylvania
NCAA tournament
Mar 16, 2000*	(12 MW)	vs. (5 MW) No. 19 Kentucky; First Round	L 80–85 ^{2OT}	21–10	CSU Convocation Center; Cleveland, Ohio
*Non-conference game. ^{#}Rankings from AP Poll. (#) Tournament seedings in parentheses. MW=Midwest. All times are in Eastern Time.
