= 1999–2000 UCLA Bruins men's basketball team =

American college basketball season

1999–2000 UCLA Bruins men's basketball

NCAA tournament, Sweet Sixteen
- Conference: Pacific-10

Ranking
- Coaches: No. 23
- Record: 21–12 (10–8 Pac-10)
- Head coach: Steve Lavin (4th season)
- Assistant coaches: Michael Holton; Jim Saia; Steve Spencer
- Home arena: Pauley Pavilion

1999–2000 Pacific-10 Conference men's basketball standings
	Conf.				Overall
Team	W		L	PCT	W		L	PCT
No. 8 Arizona	15	–	3	.833	27	–	7	.794
No. 5 Stanford	15	–	3	.833	27	–	4	.871
Oregon	13	–	5	.722	22	–	8	.733
No. 23 UCLA	10	–	8	.556	21	–	12	.636
Arizona State	10	–	8	.556	18	–	12	.600
USC	9	–	9	.500	16	–	14	.533
California	7	–	11	.389	16	–	14	.533
Oregon State	5	–	13	.278	13	–	16	.448
Washington	5	–	13	.278	10	–	20	.333
Washington State	1	–	17	.056	6	–	22	.214
As of July 26, 2011; Rankings from AP Poll

The 1999–2000 UCLA Bruins men's basketball team represented the University of California, Los Angeles in the 1999–2000 NCAA Division I men's basketball season. The team finished 4th in the conference. The Bruins competed in the 2000 NCAA Division I men's basketball tournament, losing to the Iowa State Cyclones in the sweet sixteen.

== Roster ==
1999–2000 UCLA Bruins men's basketball team
Players
Coaches

Pos.	#	Name	Height	Weight	Year	Hometown
G	21	Ryan Bailey	6 ft 2 in (1.88 m)	—	Jr
F	23	Matt Barnes	6 ft 7 in (2.01 m)	226 lb (103 kg)	So	Santa Clara, California
F	44	Brandon Brooks	6 ft 6 in (1.98 m)	—	Fr
F	30	Sean Farnham (C)	6 ft 6 in (1.98 m)	—	Sr
C	50	Dan Gadzuric	6 ft 11 in (2.11 m)	240 lb (109 kg)	So	The Hague, Netherlands
G/F	22	Rico Hines (C)	6 ft 4 in (1.93 m)	—	Jr	Greenville, North Carolina
F	24	Jason Kapono	6 ft 7 in (2.01 m)	—	Fr	Long Beach, California
G/F	3	Billy Knight	6 ft 5 in (1.96 m)	—	So
F/C	0	Jérôme Moïso	6 ft 10 in (2.08 m)	—	So	Paris, France
F	4	JaRon Rush	6 ft 7 in (2.01 m)	—	So	Kansas City, Kansas
G	25	Earl Watson (C)	6 ft 1 in (1.85 m)	—	Jr	Kansas City, Kansas
G	34	Ray Young	6 ft 3 in (1.91 m)	—	So

Head coach

Steve Lavin (Chapman)

Assistant coach(es)

- Michael Holton (UCLA)
- Jim Saia (Chapman)
- Steve Spencer (Somona State)

Legend

- (C) Team captain
- (S) Suspended
- (I) Ineligible
- (W) Walk-on
- Injured
- Current redshirt

Roster
Last update: 30 January 2018

== Schedule ==
Date time, TV	Rank^{#}	Opponent^{#}	Result	Record	Site city, state
Exhibition
November 10, 1999	No. 13	vs. Kraitene	W 90–66	0–0	Pauley Pavilion; Los Angeles, CA
November 18, 1999	No. 13	vs. California All Stars	W 83–73	0–0	Pauley Pavilion; Los Angeles, CA
Regular Season
November 23, 1999	No. 13	Fairfield	W 76–57	1–0	Pauley Pavilion (7,273); Los Angeles, CA
November 27, 1999	No. 13	Iona	W 105–73	2–0	Pauley Pavilion (7,261); Los Angeles, CA
December 1, 1999	No. 12	Morgan State	W 100–39	3–0	Pauley Pavilion (6,531); Los Angeles, CA
December 11, 1999; FSN	No. 11	No. 24 Gonzaga	L 43–59	3–1	Pauley Pavilion (9,951); Los Angeles, CA
December 18, 1999; FSN	No. 18	No. 19 DePaul	W 76–58	4–1	Pauley Pavilion (10,024); Los Angeles, CA
December 21, 1999	No. 18	vs. Maine; Pearl Harbor Invitational	W 83–62	5–1	George Q. Cannon Activities Center (500); Laie, HI
December 22, 1999	No. 18	vs. Colorado State; Pearl Harbor Invitational	L 54–55	5–2	George Q. Cannon Activities Center (500); Laie, HI
December 23, 1999	No. 18	vs. South Florida; Pearl Harbor Invitational	W 103–98 ^{OT}	6–2	George Q. Cannon Activities Center (500); Laie, HI
December 28, 1999; FSNW2	No. 23	Pepperdine	W 68–66	7–2	Pauley Pavilion (8,244); Los Angeles, CA
December 30, 1999; FSNW2	No. 23	Purdue	W 55–53	8–2	Pauley Pavilion (10,290); Los Angeles, CA
January 6, 2000	No. 24	at Washington	L 62–63	8–3 (0–1)	Key Arena (9,012); Seattle, WA
January 8, 2000	No. 24	at Washington State	W 86–64	9–3 (1–1)	Beasley Coliseum (3,189); Corvallis, OR
January 12, 2000; FSN		at USC	L 79–91	9–4 (1–2)	Los Angeles Memorial Sports Arena (10,001); Los Angeles, CA
January 15, 2000; CBS		at North Carolina	W 71–68	10–4	Dean Smith Center (21,572); Chapel Hill, NC
January 20, 2000; FSN	No. 25	No. 2 Arizona	L 61–76	10–5 (1–3)	Pauley Pavilion (12,202); Los Angeles, CA
January 22, 2000; FSNW2	No. 25	Arizona State	W 83–77	11–5 (2–3)	Pauley Pavilion (9,557); Los Angeles, CA
January 27, 2000; FSNW2		at Oregon State	W 85–74	12–5 (3–3)	Gill Coliseum (6,014); Corvallis, OR
January 29, 2000; FSN		at Oregon	L 58–73	12–6 (3–4)	McArthur Court (9,087); Eugene, OR
February 3, 2000; FSN		No. 2 Stanford	L 63–78	12–7 (3–5)	Pauley Pavilion (11,692); Los Angeles, CA
February 5, 2000; ABC		California	L 70–73	12–8 (3–6)	Pauley Pavilion (9,596); Los Angeles, CA
February 9, 2000; FSNW2		USC	W 83–78	13–8 (4–6)	Pauley Pavilion (11,076); Los Angeles, CA
February 13, 2000; CBS		at No. 4 Syracuse	L 67–71	13–9	Carrier Dome (29,731); Syracuse, NY
February 17, 2000; FSNW2		at Arizona State	L 75–104	13–10 (4–7)	Wells Fargo Arena (10,036); Tempe, AZ
February 19, 2000; ABC		at No. 4 Arizona	L 84–99	13–11 (4–8)	McKale Center (14,532); Tucson, AZ
February 24, 2000; FSN		Oregon	W 75–69	14–11 (5–8)	Pauley Pavilion (7,672); Los Angeles, CA
February 26, 2000; FSN		Oregon State	W 69–59	15–11 (6–8)	Pauley Pavilion (9,759); Los Angeles, CA
March 02, 2000; FSN		at California	W 83–62	16–11 (7–8)	Haas Pavilion (12,172); Berkeley, CA
March 04, 2000; CBS		at No. 1 Stanford	W 94–93 ^{OT}	17–11 (8–8)	Maples Pavilion (7,391); Stanford, CA
March 09, 2000		Washington State	W 65–58	18–11 (9–8)	Pauley Pavilion (9,614); Los Angeles, CA
March 11, 2000; FSNW2		Washington	W 90–64	19–11 (10–8)	Pauley Pavilion (10,305); Los Angeles, CA
NCAA tournament
March 16, 2000		vs. Ball State; First Round	W 65–57	20–11	Metrodome (20,127); Minneapolis, MN
March 18, 2000; CBS		vs. No. 17 Maryland; Second Round	W 105–70	21–11	Metrodome (26,358); Minneapolis, MN
March 23, 2000; CBS		vs. No. 6 Iowa State; Sweet Sixteen	L 56–80	21–12	Palace of Auburn Hills (21,214); Auburn Hills, MI
*Non-conference game. ^{#}Rankings from AP Poll. (#) Tournament seedings in parentheses. All times are in Pacific Time.
