= 2000 MAAC men's basketball tournament =

- Classification: Division I
- Season: 1999–00
- Teams: 10
- Site: Times Union Center; Albany, New York
- Champions: Iona
- Winning coach: Jeff Ruland (1st title)
- MVP: Tariq Kirksay (Iona)

1999–2000 MAAC men's basketball standings
	Conf.				Overall
Team	W		L	PCT	W		L	PCT
Siena	15	–	3	.833	24	–	9	.727
Iona †	13	–	5	.722	20	–	11	.645
Fairfield	11	–	7	.611	14	–	15	.483
Marist	10	–	8	.556	14	–	14	.500
Niagara	10	–	8	.556	17	–	12	.586
Manhattan	9	–	9	.500	12	–	15	.444
Rider	8	–	10	.444	16	–	14	.533
Canisius	8	–	10	.444	10	–	20	.333
Loyola (MD)	4	–	14	.222	7	–	21	.250
Saint Peter's	2	–	16	.111	5	–	23	.179
† 2000 MAAC tournament winner Rankings from AP Poll

The 2000 Metro Atlantic Athletic Conference men's basketball tournament took place March 3–6, 2000, at the Times Union Center in Albany, New York. The winner, Iona, was crowned with the Metro Atlantic Athletic Conference championship and received an automatic bid into the 2000 NCAA tournament.

== Bracket ==
First round Friday, March 3
8	Canisius	83
9	Loyola (MD)	69
7	Rider	73
10	Saint Peter's	58

Quarterfinals; Saturday, March 4
1	Siena	82
8	Canisius	71
5	Niagara	83
4	Marist	65
3	Fairfield	67
6	Manhattan	50
2	Iona	64
7	Rider	59

Semifinals; Sunday, March 5
1	Siena	90
5	Niagara	88
3	Fairfield	72
2	Iona	76

Final; Monday, March 6
1	Siena	80
2	Iona	84
