= 1999–2000 Stanford Cardinal men's basketball team =

American college basketball season

1999–2000 Stanford Cardinal men's basketball

Pac-10 Regular Season co-champions Coaches vs. Cancer Classic champions

NCAA tournament, second round
- Conference: Pacific-10 Conference

Ranking
- Coaches: No. 5
- AP: No. 3
- Record: 27–4 (15–3 Pac-10)
- Head coach: Mike Montgomery (14th season)
- Assistant coaches: Tony Fuller; Eric Reveno; Blaine Taylor
- Home arena: Maples Pavilion (Capacity: 7,392)

1999–2000 Pacific-10 Conference men's basketball standings
	Conf.				Overall
Team	W		L	PCT	W		L	PCT
No. 8 Arizona	15	–	3	.833	27	–	7	.794
No. 5 Stanford	15	–	3	.833	27	–	4	.871
Oregon	13	–	5	.722	22	–	8	.733
No. 23 UCLA	10	–	8	.556	21	–	12	.636
Arizona State	10	–	8	.556	18	–	12	.600
USC	9	–	9	.500	16	–	14	.533
California	7	–	11	.389	16	–	14	.533
Oregon State	5	–	13	.278	13	–	16	.448
Washington	5	–	13	.278	10	–	20	.333
Washington State	1	–	17	.056	6	–	22	.214
As of July 26, 2011; Rankings from AP Poll

The 1999–2000 Stanford Cardinal men's basketball team represented Stanford University as a member of the Pac-10 Conference during the 1999–2000 NCAA Division I men's basketball season. The team was led by head coach Mike Montgomery and played their home games at Maples Pavilion. Stanford spent a total of five weeks as the top-ranked team in the AP poll, finished tied atop the Pac-10 regular season standings, and received an at-large bid to the 2000 NCAA tournament as No. 1 seed in the South Region. After an opening round win over South Carolina State, the Cardinal were upset by No. 8 seed North Carolina. Stanford finished with an overall record of 27–4 (15–3 Pac-10).

== Roster ==
1999–2000 Stanford Cardinal men's basketball team
Players
Coaches

Pos.	#	Name	Height	Weight	Year	Previous school	Hometown
C	11	Curtis Borchardt	7 ft 0 in (2.13 m)	230 lb (104 kg)	Fr	Eastlake	Sammamish, Washington
G	21	David Moseley	6 ft 4 in (1.93 m)	—	Sr
G/F	23	Casey Jacobsen	6 ft 6 in (1.98 m)	210 lb (95 kg)	Fr	Glendora	Glendora, California
G	24	Julius Barnes	6 ft 1 in (1.85 m)	180 lb (82 kg)	Fr		Rowland Heights, California
C	31	Jarron Collins	6 ft 11 in (2.11 m)	240 lb (109 kg)	Jr	Harvard-Westlake	Los Angeles, California
C	34	Jason Collins	7 ft 0 in (2.13 m)	245 lb (111 kg)	Jr	Harvard-Westlake	Los Angeles, California
F	45	Mark Madsen	6 ft 9 in (2.06 m)	245 lb (111 kg)	Sr	San Ramon Valley	Danville, California

Head coach

- Mike Montgomery (Long Beach State)

Assistant coach(es)

Legend

- (C) Team captain
- (S) Suspended
- (I) Ineligible
- (W) Walk-on
- Injured
- Current redshirt

Roster

== Schedule and results ==
Date time, TV	Rank^{#}	Opponent^{#}	Result	Record	Site (attendance) city, state
Regular season
Nov 11, 1999*	No. 13	vs. No. 10 Duke; Coaches vs. Cancer Classic	W 80–79 ^{OT}	1–0	Madison Square Garden; New York, New York
Nov 12, 1999*	No. 13	vs. Iowa; Coaches vs. Cancer Classic	W 72–58	2–0	Madison Square Garden; New York, New York
Nov 20, 1999*	No. 9	at UC Santa Barbara	W 62–49	3–0	The Thunderdome; Santa Barbara, California
Nov 24, 1999*	No. 9	Cal State Bakersfield	W 72–31	4–0	Maples Pavilion; Stanford, California
Nov 27, 1999*	No. 9	vs. No. 2 Auburn; John R. Wooden Classic	W 67–58	5–0	Arrowhead Pond of Anaheim; Anaheim, California
Dec 11, 1999*	No. 3	at Georgia Tech	W 64–61 ^{OT}	6–0	Alexander Memorial Coliseum; Atlanta, Georgia
Dec 16, 1999*	No. 2	Nevada	W 68–39	7–0	Maples Pavilion; Stanford, California
Dec 18, 1999*	No. 2	Sacramento State	W 78–56	8–0	Maples Pavilion; Stanford, California
Dec 21, 1999*	No. 1	vs. Mississippi State	W 76–56	9–0	The Arena in Oakland; Oakland, California
Dec 29, 1999*	No. 1	New Hampshire	W 119–60	10–0	Maples Pavilion; Stanford, California
Dec 30, 1999*	No. 1	Davidson	W 87–61	11–0	Maples Pavilion; Stanford, California
Jan 6, 2000*	No. 1	Arizona State	W 86–67	12–0 (1–0)	Maples Pavilion; Stanford, California
Jan 8, 2000*	No. 1	No. 5 Arizona	L 65–68	12–1 (1–1)	Maples Pavilion; Stanford, California
Jan 13, 2000	No. 3	at Oregon State	W 73–45	13–1 (2–1)	Gill Coliseum; Corvallis, Oregon
Jan 15, 2000	No. 3	at Oregon	W 85–71	14–1 (3–1)	McArthur Court; Eugene, Oregon
Jan 22, 2000	No. 3	at California	W 81–70	15–1 (4–1)	Haas Pavilion; Berkeley, California
Jan 27, 2000	No. 2	Washington	W 92–62	16–1 (5–1)	Maples Pavilion; Stanford, California
Jan 29, 2000	No. 2	Washington State	W 63–38	17–1 (6–1)	Maples Pavilion; Stanford, California
Feb 3, 2000	No. 2	at UCLA	W 78–63	18–1 (7–1)	Pauley Pavilion; Los Angeles, California
Feb 5, 2000	No. 2	at USC	W 67–57	19–1 (8–1)	L.A. Sports Arena; Los Angeles, California
Feb 10, 2000	No. 2	No. 24 Oregon	W 76–61	20–1 (9–1)	Maples Pavilion; Stanford, California
Feb 12, 2000	No. 2	Oregon State	W 82–56	21–1 (10–1)	Maples Pavilion; Stanford, California
Feb 19, 2000	No. 2	California	W 101–50	22–1 (11–1)	Maples Pavilion; Stanford, California
Feb 24, 2000	No. 1	at Washington State	W 89–52	23–1 (12–1)	Friel Court; Pullman, Washington
Feb 26, 2000	No. 1	at Washington	W 77–52	24–1 (13–1)	Bank of America Arena; Seattle, Washington
Mar 2, 2000	No. 1	USC	W 111–68	25–1 (13–1)	Maples Pavilion; Stanford, California
Mar 4, 2000	No. 1	UCLA	L 93–94 ^{OT}	25–2 (13–2)	Maples Pavilion; Stanford, California
Mar 9, 2000	No. 2	at No. 9 Arizona	L 81–86	25–3 (14–3)	McKale Center; Tucson, Arizona
Mar 11, 2000	No. 2	at Arizona State	W 65–57	26–3 (15–3)	Wells Fargo Arena; Tempe, Arizona
NCAA tournament
Mar 17, 2000*	(1 S) No. 3	vs. (16 S) South Carolina State; Second Round	W 84–65	27–3	Birmingham-Jefferson Civic Center; Birmingham, Alabama
Mar 19, 2000*	(1 S) No. 3	vs. (8 S) North Carolina; Second Round	L 53–60	27–4	Birmingham-Jefferson Civic Center; Birmingham, Alabama
*Non-conference game. ^{#}Rankings from AP Poll. (#) Tournament seedings in parentheses. S=South. All times are in Pacific Time. (#) during NCAA is seed within region.

Schedule Source:

== Rankings ==
Ranking movements Legend: ██ Increase in ranking ██ Decrease in ranking
	Week																			
Poll	Pre	1	2	3	4	5	6	7	8	9	10	11	12	13	14	15	16	17	18	Final
AP	13	9	9	3	3	2	1	1	1	3	3	2	2	2	2	1	1	2	3	Not released
Coaches	13	13^	8	3	3	2	1	1	1	3	3	2	2	2	2	1	1	3	3	5

*AP does not release post-NCAA Tournament rankings
^Coaches did not release a week 2 poll

== 2000 NBA draft ==
Round	Pick	Player	NBA Team
1	29	Mark Madsen	Los Angeles Lakers
