= 1999–2000 Duke Blue Devils men's basketball team =

American college basketball season

1999–2000 Duke Blue Devils men's basketball

NCAA Division I regular season champions ACC tournament champions ACC regular season champions

NCAA tournament, Sweet Sixteen
- Conference: Atlantic Coast Conference

Ranking
- Coaches: No. 4
- AP: No. 1
- Record: 29–5 (15–1 ACC)
- Head coach: Mike Krzyzewski (20th season)
- Assistant coaches: Johnny Dawkins; David Henderson; Steve Wojciechowski
- Home arena: Cameron Indoor Stadium

1999–2000 ACC men's basketball standings
	Conf.				Overall
Team	W		L	PCT	W		L	PCT
No. 1 Duke †	15	–	1	.938	29	–	5	.853
No. 17 Maryland	11	–	5	.688	25	–	10	.714
Virginia	9	–	7	.563	19	–	12	.613
North Carolina	9	–	7	.563	22	–	14	.611
Wake Forest	7	–	9	.438	22	–	14	.611
NC State	6	–	10	.375	20	–	14	.588
Florida State	5	–	11	.313	13	–	17	.433
Georgia Tech	5	–	11	.313	13	–	17	.433
Clemson	4	–	12	.250	10	–	20	.333
† 2000 ACC tournament winner Rankings from AP Poll

The 1999–2000 Duke Blue Devils men's basketball team represented Duke University. The head coach was Mike Krzyzewski. The team played its home games in Cameron Indoor Stadium in Durham, North Carolina, and was a member of the Atlantic Coast Conference. Duke had an overall record of 29–5 (15–1 ACC). In the 2000 NCAA Tournament the team was invited as a #1 seed. After two wins vs Lamar and Kansas, Duke was knocked out by #5 seed Florida 87–78.

== Schedule and results ==
Date time, TV	Rank^{#}	Opponent^{#}	Result	Record	Site city, state
Regular season
November 11, 1999*; ESPN2; Brad Nessler, Dick Vitale, Jay Bilas	No. 10	vs. No. 13 Stanford; Coaches vs. Cancer Classic	L 79–80 ^{OT}	0–1	Madison Square Garden; New York, New York
November 12, 1999*; ESPN2; John Saunders, Dick Vitale, Jay Bilas	No. 10	vs. No. 1 Connecticut; Coaches vs. Cancer Classic	L 66–71	0–2	Madison Square Garden; New York, New York
November 20, 1999*	No. 18	Army	W 100–42	1–2	Cameron Indoor Stadium; Durham, North Carolina
November 23, 1999*	No. 16	Columbia	W 99–52	2–2	Cameron Indoor Stadium; Durham, North Carolina
November 27, 1999*	No. 16	vs. USC	W 81–68	3–2	Honda Center; Anaheim, California
November 30, 1999*; ESPN; Brad Nessler, Dick Vitale, Brad Daugherty	No. 17	vs. No. 16 Illinois; ACC–Big Ten Challenge	W 72–69	4–2	United Center; Chicago, Illinois
December 4, 1999*; ESPN; Mike Tirico, Dick Vitale	No. 17	No. 22 DePaul	W 84–83 ^{OT}	5–2	Cameron Indoor Stadium; Durham, North Carolina
December 11, 1999*; CBS; Jim Nantz, Billy Packer	No. 14	at Michigan; Rivalry	W 104–97	6–2	Crisler Center; Ann Arbor, Michigan
December 19, 1999*	No. 11	North Carolina A&T	W 101–60	7–2	Cameron Indoor Stadium; Durham, North Carolina
December 21, 1999*	No. 10	Davidson	W 109–65	8–2	Cameron Indoor Stadium; Durham, North Carolina
January 2, 2000*	No. 9	William & Mary	W 96–55	9–2	Cameron Indoor Stadium; Durham, North Carolina
January 5, 2000; ESPN; Dan Shulman, Dan Bonner	No. 8	at Virginia	W 109–100 ^{OT}	10–2 (1–0)	University Hall; Charlottesville, Virginia
January 9, 2000; CBS; Verne Lundquist, Billy Packer	No. 8	at No. 12 Maryland; Rivalry	W 80–70	11–2 (2–0)	Cole Field House; College Park, Maryland
January 12, 2000	No. 6	Georgia Tech	W 82–57	12–2 (3–0)	Cameron Indoor Stadium; Durham, North Carolina
January 16, 2000	No. 6	at Florida State	W 85–54	13–2 (4–0)	Donald L. Tucker Civic Center; Tallahassee, Florida
January 19, 2000; ESPN; Mike Patrick, Dick Vitale, Brad Daugherty	No. 5	NC State	W 92–88 ^{OT}	14–2 (5–0)	Cameron Indoor Stadium; Durham, North Carolina
January 22, 2000; CBS; Gus Johnson, Dan Bonner	No. 5	at Wake Forest	W 75–61	15–2 (6–0)	LJVM Coliseum; Winston-Salem, North Carolina
January 29, 2000	No. 3	Clemson	W 93–59	16–2 (7–0)	Cameron Indoor Stadium; Durham, North Carolina
February 3, 2000; ESPN2; Mike Patrick, Dick Vitale, Brad Daugherty	No. 3	at North Carolina; Rivalry	W 90–86 ^{OT}	17–2 (8–0)	Dean Smith Center; Chapel Hill, North Carolina
February 5, 2000; ABC; Brent Musburger, Dick Vitale, Brad Daugherty	No. 3	Virginia	W 106–86	18–2 (9–0)	Cameron Indoor Stadium; Durham, North Carolina
February 9, 2000	No. 3	No. 23 Maryland; Rivalry	L 87–98	18–3 (9–1)	Cameron Indoor Stadium; Durham, North Carolina
February 12, 2000	No. 3	at Georgia Tech	W 84–65	19–3 (10–1)	Alexander Memorial Coliseum; Atlanta, Georgia
February 16, 2000	No. 3	Florida State	W 101–68	20–3 (11–1)	Cameron Indoor Stadium; Durham, North Carolina
February 19, 2000; ABC; Brent Musburger, Dick Vitale	No. 3	at NC State	W 71–66	21–3 (12–1)	RBC Center; Raleigh, North Carolina
February 22, 2000	No. 2	Wake Forest	W 96–78	22–3 (13–1)	Cameron Indoor Stadium; Durham, North Carolina
February 26, 2000*; CBS; Jim Nantz, Billy Packer	No. 2	St. John's	L 82–83	22–4	Cameron Indoor Stadium; Durham, North Carolina
March 1, 2000; ESPN; Mike Patrick, Dan Bonner	No. 4	at Clemson	W 92–78	23–4 (14–1)	Littlejohn Coliseum; Clemson, South Carolina
March 4, 2000; ABC; Brent Musburger, Dick Vitale, Brad Daugherty	No. 4	North Carolina; Rivalry	W 90–76	24–4 (15–1)	Cameron Indoor Stadium; Durham, North Carolina
ACC tournament
March 9, 2000	(1) No. 3	vs. (9) Clemson; First Round	W 94–63	25–4	Bojangles' Coliseum; Charlotte, North Carolina
March 11, 2000; ESPN; Mike Patrick, Dick Vitale, Brad Daugherty	(1) No. 3	vs. (5) Wake Forest; Semifinals	W 82–73	26–4	Bojangles' Coliseum; Charlotte, North Carolina
March 12, 2000; ESPN; Mike Patrick, Dick Vitale, Brad Daugherty	(1) No. 3	vs. (2) No. 20 Maryland; Championship / Rivalry	W 81–68	27–4	Bojangles' Coliseum; Charlotte, North Carolina
NCAA tournament
March 17, 2000*; CBS; Jim Nantz, Billy Packer, Bonnie Bernstein	(1 E) No. 1	vs. (16 E) Lamar; First Round	W 82–55	28–4	LJVM Coliseum; Winston-Salem, North Carolina
March 19, 2000*; CBS; Jim Nantz, Billy Packer, Bonnie Bernstein	(1 E) No. 1	vs. (8 E) Kansas; Second Round	W 82–73	29–4	LJVM Coliseum; Winston-Salem, North Carolina
March 24, 2000*; CBS; Jim Nantz, Billy Packer, Bonnie Bernstein	(1 E) No. 1	vs. (5 E) No. 13 Florida; Sweet Sixteen	L 78–87	29–5	Carrier Dome; Syracuse, New York
*Non-conference game. ^{#}Rankings from AP Poll. (#) Tournament seedings in parentheses.

== Awards and honors ==
- Mike Krzyzewski, ACC Coach of the Year
- Mike Krzyzewski, Legends of Coaching Award (adopted by the John R.Wooden Award Committee)
- Chris Carrawell, ACC Player of the Year

== Team players drafted into the NBA ==
Round	Pick	Player	NBA club
2	41	Chris Carrawell	San Antonio Spurs
