= 1999–2000 Maryland Terrapins men's basketball team =

American college basketball season

1999–00 Maryland Terrapins men's basketball

NCAA tournament, second round
- Conference: Atlantic Coast Conference

Ranking
- Coaches: No. 25
- AP: No. 17
- Record: 25–10 (11–5 ACC)
- Head coach: Gary Williams
- Assistant coaches: Billy Hahn; Dave Dickerson; Jimmy Patsos; Troy Wainwright
- Home arena: Cole Field House

1999–2000 ACC men's basketball standings
	Conf.				Overall
Team	W		L	PCT	W		L	PCT
No. 1 Duke †	15	–	1	.938	29	–	5	.853
No. 17 Maryland	11	–	5	.688	25	–	10	.714
Virginia	9	–	7	.563	19	–	12	.613
North Carolina	9	–	7	.563	22	–	14	.611
Wake Forest	7	–	9	.438	22	–	14	.611
NC State	6	–	10	.375	20	–	14	.588
Florida State	5	–	11	.313	13	–	17	.433
Georgia Tech	5	–	11	.313	13	–	17	.433
Clemson	4	–	12	.250	10	–	20	.333
† 2000 ACC tournament winner Rankings from AP Poll

The 1999–2000 Maryland Terrapins men's basketball team represented the University of Maryland in the 1999–2000 college basketball season as a member of the Atlantic Coast Conference (ACC). The team was led by head coach Gary Williams and played their home games at the Cole Field House. They lost to UCLA in the 2000 NCAA tournament.

== Pre-season ==
=== Accolades ===
Team
ESPN/USA Today ranked No. 23

Terence Morris
Preseason All-American
Wooden Award Candidate
Preseason ACC Player of the year

== Roster ==
1999–2000 Maryland Terrapins men's basketball team
Players
Coaches

Pos.	#	Name	Height	Weight	Year	Hometown
G	3	Juan Dixon	6 ft 3 in (1.91 m)	152 lb (69 kg)	So	Baltimore, Maryland
G	4	Earl Badu	6 ft 0 in (1.83 m)	167 lb (76 kg)	So	Baltimore, Maryland
G	11	Calvin McCall	6 ft 3 in (1.91 m)	200 lb (91 kg)	Fr	Orlando, Florida
G	12	Drew Nicholas	6 ft 3 in (1.91 m)	165 lb (75 kg)	Fr	Hampstead, New York
G	15	Danny Miller	6 ft 8 in (2.03 m)	205 lb (93 kg)	So	Mt. Holly, New Jersey
G	20	Matt Hahn	6 ft 0 in (1.83 m)	162 lb (73 kg)	Sr	Columbia, Maryland
F	21	LaRon Cephas	6 ft 7 in (2.01 m)	223 lb (101 kg)	Jr	Wilmington, Delaware
G	25	Steve Blake	6 ft 3 in (1.91 m)	175 lb (79 kg)	Fr	Miami Lakes, Florida
G/F	31	Byron Mouton	6 ft 6 in (1.98 m)	215 lb (98 kg)	RS Jr	Rayne, Louisiana
F/C	33	Mike Mardesich	7 ft 0 in (2.13 m)	255 lb (116 kg)	Jr	Boston, Massachusetts
F	35	Lonny Baxter	6 ft 8 in (2.03 m)	250 lb (113 kg)	So	Silver Spring, Maryland
F	44	Terence Morris	6 ft 9 in (2.06 m)	205 lb (93 kg)	Jr	Frederick, Maryland
F	45	Tahj Holden	6 ft 10 in (2.08 m)	235 lb (107 kg)	Fr	Red Bank, New Jersey

Head coach

- Gary Williams (Maryland)

Assistant coach(es)

- Billy Hahn (Maryland)
- Dave Dickerson (Maryland)
- Jimmy Patsos (Catholic)
- Troy Wainwright (Maryland)

Legend

- (C) Team captain
- (S) Suspended
- (I) Ineligible
- (W) Walk-on
- Injured
- Current redshirt

Roster
Last update: 2000-03-19

== Season Recap ==
The Terrapins opened their season with a victory over San Francisco in the Preseason NIT – Gary Williams' 400th career win. They beat Tulane in the preseason tournament before losing to Kentucky in the semifinals. They defeated Notre Dame in the consolation game.

They would go on to win all of their non-conference home games, extending their home out of conference winning streak to 72 games. Maryland did not lose a non-conference game in Cole Field house in the 1990s.

The team lost its ACC opener at NC State and dropped two more to begin league play 0-3. After the poor start in conference, however, the Terrapins went 11-2 over the remainder of the season to finish 2nd in the ACC. The Terrapins' signature victory of the season came when they defeated #3 Duke in Cameron Indoor Stadium, ending an 18-game win streak, 46-game home winning streak, and 31-game ACC home winning streak for the Blue Devils. Following the win, Maryland students rioted on the College Park campus.

In the ACC Tournament, the team advanced to the championship game, where they lost to Duke.

Receiving a #3 seed in the 2000 NCAA Tournament, the Terrapins defeated #14 seed Iona 74-59. However, in the second round Williams' team looked "helpless" as #6 seed UCLA put on an offensive showcase and won easily 105-70, one of the worst tournament losses in Maryland history.

In the summer of 2000, the University of Maryland broke ground on the Comcast Center.

=== Accolades ===
Juan Dixon
1st Team All-Acc
Lonny Baxter
1st Team All-ACC
Steve Blake
All-ACC honorable mention

== Schedule ==
Date time, TV	Rank^{#}	Opponent^{#}	Result	Record	Site (attendance) city, state
Exhibition
11/03/99*		Down Under All-Stars	W 98-79		Cole Field House (NA); College Park, Maryland
11/09/99*		California All-Stars	W 105-98		Cole Field House (NA); College Park, Maryland
Regular season
11/17/99*		San Francisco; Preseason NIT	W 71–61	1–0	Cole Field House (14,317); College Park, Maryland
11/19/99*		Tulane; Preseason NIT	W 78–70	2–0	Cole Field House (14,500); College Park, Maryland
11/22/99*	No. 24	Fairleigh Dickinson	W 104–45	3–0	Cole Field House (13,724); College Park, Maryland
11/24/99*	No. 24	vs. No. 11 Kentucky; Preseason NIT – Semifinals	L 58–61	3–1	Madison Square Garden (10,762); New York City
11/26/99*	No. 24	vs. Notre Dame; Preseason NIT – Consolation	W 72–67	4–1	Madison Square Garden (NA); New York
11/30/99*	No. 24	Iowa; ACC – Big Ten Challenge	W 83–65	5–1	Baltimore Arena (12,310); Baltimore
12/04/99*	No. 24	vs. No. 16 Illinois; BB&T Classic	W 69–67	6–1	MCI Center (13,536); Washington, D.C.
12/05/99*	No. 24	vs. George Washington; BB&T Classic	L 69–74	6–2	MCI Center (13,703); Washington, D.C.
12/07/99*	No. 21	Winthrop	W 76–65 ^{OT}	7–2	Cole Field House (10,107); College Park, Maryland
12/11/99*	No. 21	No. 23 Kentucky	W 72–66	8–2	Cole Field House (14,500); College Park, Maryland
12/27/99*	No. 14	George Mason	W 69–66	9–2	Cole Field House (14,500); College Park, Maryland
12/30/99*	No. 14	UMBC	W 82–52	10–2	Cole Field House (14,500); College Park, Maryland
01/02/00*	No. 14	Coastal Carolina	W 100–48	11–2	Cole Field House (14,402); College Park, Maryland
01/06/00	No. 12	at NC State	L 66–68	11–3 (0–1)	Entertainment and Sports Arena (19,525); Raleigh, North Carolina
01/09/00	No. 12	No. 8 Duke	L 70–80	11–4 (0–2)	Cole Field House (14,500); College Park, Maryland
01/15/00	No. 18	at Georgia Tech	L 68–69	11–5 (0–3)	Alexander Memorial Coliseum (7,892); Atlanta
01/19/00	No. 24	Wake Forest	W 73–51	12–5 (1–3)	Cole Field House (14,319); College Park, Maryland
01/22/00	No. 24	Clemson	W 74–62	13–5 (2–3)	Cole Field House (14,500); College Park, Maryland
01/27/00	No. 22	at North Carolina	L 63–75	13–6 (2–4)	Dean E. Smith Center (15,455); Chapel Hill, North Carolina
01/29/00	No. 22	at Florida State	W 82–63	14–6 (3–4)	Leon County Civic Center (5,534); Tallahassee, Florida
02/02/00	No. 25	Virginia	W 91–79	15–6 (4–4)	Cole Field House (14,500); College Park, Maryland
02/06/00	No. 25	NC State	W 78–73	16–6 (5–4)	Cole Field House (14,500); College Park, Maryland
02/09/00	No. 23	at No. 3 Duke	W 98–87	17–6 (6–4)	Cameron Indoor Stadium (9,314); Durham, North Carolina
02/13/00*	No. 23	at No. 19 Temple	L 65–73	17–7	Liacouras Center (10,206); Philadelphia
02/16/00	No. 22	Georgia Tech	W 82–70	18–7 (7–4)	Cole Field House (14,500); College Park, Maryland
02/19/00	No. 22	at Wake Forest	W 73–67	19–7 (8–4)	Lawrence Joel Coliseum (12,425); Winston-Salem, North Carolina
02/22/00	No. 19	at Clemson	W 76–63	20–7 (9–4)	Littlejohn Coliseum (8,000); Clemson, South Carolina
02/26/00	No. 19	North Carolina	W 81–73	21–7 (10–4)	Cole Field House (14,500); College Park, Maryland
03/01/00	No. 17	Florida State	W 85–70	22–7 (11–4)	Cole Field House (14,500); College Park, Maryland
03/04/00	No. 17	at Virginia	L 87–89	22–8 (11–5)	University Hall (8,457); Charlottesville, Virginia
ACC tournament
03/10/00	No. 20	vs. Florida State; 2nd Round	W 82–61	23–8	Charlotte Coliseum (23,895); Charlotte, North Carolina
03/11/00	No. 20	vs. North Carolina State; Semifinal	W 64–61	24–8	Charlotte Coliseum (23,895); Charlotte, North Carolina
03/12/00	No. 20	vs. No. 3 Duke; Championship	L 68–81	24–9	Charlotte Coliseum (23,895); Charlotte, North Carolina
2000 NCAA men's basketball tournament
03/16/00*		vs. Iona; First Round	W 74–59	25–9	The Metrodome (20,127); Minneapolis
03/18/00*		vs. UCLA; Second Round	L 70–105	25–10	The Metrodome (26,358); Minneapolis
*Non-conference game. ^{#}Rankings from AP Poll. (#) Tournament seedings in parentheses. All times are in Eastern Time.
