= 1999–2000 Iona Gaels men's basketball team =

American college basketball season

1999–2000 Iona Gaels men's basketball
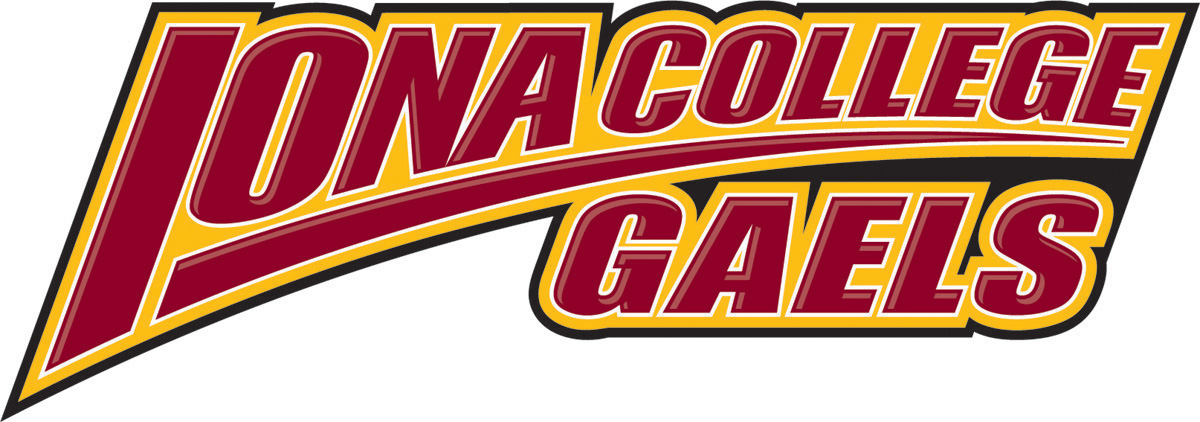

MAAC tournament champions

NCAA tournament, First Round
- Conference: Metro Atlantic Athletic Conference
- Record: 20–11 (13–5 MAAC)
- Head coach: Jeff Ruland (2nd season)
- Home arena: Hynes Athletic Center

1999–2000 MAAC men's basketball standings
	Conf.				Overall
Team	W		L	PCT	W		L	PCT
Siena	15	–	3	.833	24	–	9	.727
Iona †	13	–	5	.722	20	–	11	.645
Fairfield	11	–	7	.611	14	–	15	.483
Marist	10	–	8	.556	14	–	14	.500
Niagara	10	–	8	.556	17	–	12	.586
Manhattan	9	–	9	.500	12	–	15	.444
Rider	8	–	10	.444	16	–	14	.533
Canisius	8	–	10	.444	10	–	20	.333
Loyola (MD)	4	–	14	.222	7	–	21	.250
Saint Peter's	2	–	16	.111	5	–	23	.179
† 2000 MAAC tournament winner Rankings from AP Poll

The 1999–2000 Iona Gaels men's basketball team represented Iona College during the 1999–2000 NCAA Division I men's basketball season. The Gaels, led second-year by head coach Jeff Ruland, played their home games at the Hynes Athletic Center and were members of the Metro Atlantic Athletic Conference. The Gaels finished second in the MAAC regular season standings, and would go on to win the MAAC Basketball tournament to receive an automatic bid to the 2000 NCAA tournament. As the No. 14 seed in the Midwest region, the Gaels lost to No. 3 seed Maryland in the opening round.

== Roster ==
1999–2000 Iona Gaels men's basketball team
Players
Coaches

Pos.	#	Name	Height	Weight	Year	Hometown
G	32	Earl Johnson	6 ft 0 in (1.83 m)	—	Jr	Port Chester, New York
G/F	21	Tariq Kirksay	6 ft 6 in (1.98 m)	—	Sr	Bronx, New York
F/C	43	Nakiea Miller	6 ft 9 in (2.06 m)	—	Jr	Stratford, Connecticut

Head coach

- Jeff Ruland

Assistant coach(es)

Legend

- (C) Team captain
- (S) Suspended
- (I) Ineligible
- (W) Walk-on
- Injured
- Current redshirt

Roster

== Schedule and results ==
Date time, TV	Rank^{#}	Opponent^{#}	Result	Record	Site (attendance) city, state
Regular season
Nov 20, 1999*		UMass	L 77–85	0–1	Hynes Athletic Center (3,025); New Rochelle, New York
Nov 23, 1999*		Coppin State	W 89–61	1–1	Hynes Athletic Center (1,601); New Rochelle, New York
Nov 27, 1999*		at No. 13 UCLA	L 73–105	1–2	Pauley Pavilion (7,261); Los Angeles, California
Dec 2, 1999		at Fairfield	L 81–97	1–3 (0–1)	Alumni Hall (2,170); Fairfield, Connecticut
Dec 5, 1999		Marist	W 85–65	2–3 (1–1)	Hynes Athletic Center (1,546); New Rochelle, New York
Dec 10, 1999*		Fordham	W 83–80	3–3	Hynes Athletics Center (2,567); New Rochelle, New York
Dec 18, 1999*		at Hofstra	L 69–90	3–4	Mack Sports Complex (2,350); Hempstead, New York
Dec 23, 1999*		at St. Francis (NY)	L 98–100 ^{OT}	3–5	Pope Physical Education Center (511); Brooklyn, New York
Dec 30, 1999*		at Boston College	W 71–63	4–5	Silvio O. Conte Forum (3,895); Boston, Massachusetts
Jan 5, 2000		Saint Peter's	W 79–62	5–5 (2–1)	Hynes Athletic Center (1,207); New Rochelle, New York
Jan 8, 2000		at Canisius	L 64–80	5–6 (2–2)	Koessler Athletic Center (1,366); Buffalo, New York
Jan 10, 2000		at Niagara	L 67–79	5–7 (2–3)	Gallagher Center (960); Lewiston, New York
Jan 13, 2000		at Rider	L 84–89 ^{OT}	5–8 (2–4)	Hynes Athletic Center (1,006); New Rochelle, New York
Jan 15, 2000		Loyola (MD)	W 92–71	6–8 (3–4)	Hynes Athletic Center (1,407); New Rochelle, New York
Jan 17, 2000*		at Bucknell	L 67–73	6–9	Davis Gym (1,854); Lewisburg, Pennsylvania
Jan 19, 2000*		at Morgan State	W 77–67	7–9	Talmadge L. Hill Field House (3,215); Baltimore, Maryland
Jan 24, 2000		at Siena	W 96–92 ^{OT}	8–9 (4–4)	Times Union Center (6,008); Albany, New York
Jan 28, 2000		at Saint Peter's	W 85–66	9–9 (5–4)	Yanitelli Center (1,101); Jersey City, New Jersey
Jan 30, 2000		Fairfield	W 90–73	10–9 (6–4)	Hynes Athletics Center (1,740); New Rochelle, New York
Feb 1, 2000		at Marist	W 77–64	11–9 (7–4)	McCann Arena (1,732); Poughkeepsie, New York
Feb 4, 2000		Canisius	W 66–56	12–9 (8–4)	Hynes Athletic Center (1,522); New Rochelle, New York
Feb 6, 2000		Niagara	W 96–82	13–9 (9–4)	Hynes Athletic Center (1,586); New Rochelle, New York
Feb 11, 2000		Manhattan	W 80–78	14–9 (10–4)	Hynes Athletic Center (3,105); New Rochelle, New York
Feb 16, 2000		at Loyola (MD)	W 74–56	15–9 (11–4)	Reitz Arena (421); Baltimore, Maryland
Feb 19, 2000		Siena	L 89–94	15–10 (11–5)	Hynes Athletic Center (2,931); New Rochelle, New York
Feb 21, 2000		at Rider	W 84–79	16–10 (12–5)	Sovereign Bank Arena (2,021); Trenton, New Jersey
Feb 26, 2000		at Manhattan	W 67–61	17–10 (13–5)	Draddy Gymnasium (2,844); New York, New York
MAAC tournament
Mar 4, 2000*	(2)	vs. (7) Rider; Quarterfinals	W 64–59	18–10	Times Union Center (5,261); Albany, New York
Mar 5, 2000*	(2)	vs. (3) Fairfield; Semifinals	W 76–72	19–10	Times Union Center (8,271); Albany, New York
Mar 6, 2000*	(2)	at (1) Siena; Championship game	W 84–80	20–10	Times Union Center (11,844); Albany, New York
NCAA tournament
Mar 16, 2000*	(14 MW)	vs. (3 MW) No. 17 Maryland; First Round	L 59–74	20–11	Hubert H. Humphrey Metrodome (20,127); Minneapolis, Minnesota
*Non-conference game. ^{#}Rankings from AP Poll. (#) Tournament seedings in parentheses. MW=Midwest. All times are in Eastern Time.

== Awards and honors ==
- Tariq Kirksay – MAAC Player of the Year
