= AD Smith =

American basketball player (born 1977)

Personal information
- Born: May 21, 1977 (age 49) Corvallis, Oregon, U.S.
- Listed height: 6 ft 8 in (2.03 m)

Career information
- High school: Churchill (Eugene, Oregon)
- College: Oregon (1995–2000)
- NBA draft: 2000: undrafted
- Position: Forward / center

Career history

Playing
- 2002: Perth Wildcats
- 2004–2006: FC Mulhouse

Coaching
- 2021–2023: Willamette HS (girls' AC)

Adrian Scott Smith (born May 21, 1977) is an American basketball coach and former professional player. He most recently was an assistant coach for the girls' basketball team at Willamette High School in Eugene, Oregon. Smith played college basketball and was a 3 year team captain for the Oregon Ducks.

Smith played basketball at Winston Churchill High School in Eugene, Oregon, where he won a state championship and was named the state's Player of the Year in 1995.

Smith played professionally in Denmark, France, Austria, Luxembourg and Belgium. He played for the Perth Wildcats of the Australian National Basketball League (NBL) during the 2001–02 season. He played for BF Copenhagen and won the league and cup championship in 2002-2003 season. He played for FC Mulhouse Basket of the French LNB Pro B from 2004 to 2006.
