= 1998–99 Michigan Wolverines men's basketball team =

American college basketball season

1998–99 Michigan Wolverines men's basketball
- Conference: Big Ten Conference
- Record: 0–19 (12–19 unadjusted) (0–11 Big Ten)
- Head coach: Brian Ellerbe
- Assistant coaches: Scott Trost; Kurtis Townsend; Lorenzo Neely
- MVP: Louis Bullock
- Captains: Louis Bullock; Robbie Reid
- Home arena: Crisler Arena

1998–99 Big Ten Conference men's basketball standings
	Conf.				Overall
Team	W		L	PCT	W		L	PCT
No. 2 Michigan State†	15	–	1	.938	33	–	5	.868
No. 19 Indiana	9	–	7	.563	23	–	11	.676
No. 18 Wisconsin	9	–	7	.563	22	–	10	.688
No. 21 Iowa	9	–	7	.563	20	–	10	.667
Purdue	7	–	9	.438	21	–	13	.618
Northwestern	6	–	10	.375	15	–	14	.517
Penn State	5	–	11	.313	13	–	14	.481
Illinois	3	–	13	.188	14	–	18	.438
No. 14 Ohio State**	1	–	1	.500	1	–	1	.500
Minnesota***	0	–	8	.000	0	–	11	.000
Michigan*	0	–	11	.000	0	–	19	.000
† 1999 Big Ten tournament winner Rankings from AP poll *Michigan: 12 games vacated due to sanctions against the program **Ohio State: 34 games including 5 NCAA Tourn. games vacated due to sanctions against the program *** Minnesota vacated 17 games including 1 NCAA Tourn. game due to sanctions against the program Disputed records: Michigan: 12–19, 5–11; Ohio State: 27–9, 12–4; Minnesota: 17–11, 8–8

The 1998–99 Michigan Wolverines men's basketball team represented the University of Michigan in intercollegiate college basketball during the 1998–99 season. The team played its home games in the Crisler Arena in Ann Arbor, Michigan, and was a member of the Big Ten Conference. The Wolverines head coach was Brian Ellerbe.

Michigan finished the season with a 12-19 record and tied for ninth in the Big Ten Conference with a 5-11 conference record. The team earned a tenth seed and advanced to the second round of the 1999 Big Ten Conference men's basketball tournament, losing to Ohio State 87-69. The team failed to earn an invitation to either the 1999 National Invitation Tournament or the 1999 NCAA Division I men's basketball tournament.

== Season ==
Michigan finished the season with a 12-19 record, however due to NCAA sanctions from the University of Michigan basketball scandal, the 1999 season was vacated and this was adjusted to 0-19.

The team was unranked for all eighteen weeks of the Associated Press Top Twenty-Five Poll, and it also ended the season unranked in the final USA Today/CNN Poll. The team had a 6–11 record against ranked opponents, including the following victories: November 23, 1998, against #24 Clemson 59–56 in the Maui Invitational at Lahania Civic Center in Maui, Hawaii, December 30, 1998, against #19 Wisconsin 59–55 at home, January 5, 1999, against #13 Indiana 82–70 at home, January 16, 1999, against #21 Ohio State 84–74 at home, February 7, 1999, against #18 Minnesota 75–65 at home, February 27, 1999, against #16 Wisconsin 51–39 on the road at the Kohl's Center in Madison, Wisconsin.

On December 27, 1998, Michigan lost to Florida 79–63 in the Orange Bowl Basketball Classic in Miami.

Louis Bullock and Robbie Reid served as team co-captains, while Louis Bullock earned team MVP honors. The team's leading scorers were Louis Bullock (643 points), Robbie Reid (418 points) and John Asselin (275 points). The leading rebounders were Peter Vignier (229), John Asselin (183), and Bullock (117).

Bullock led the Big Ten Conference in free throw percentage in all games (86.4%). Reid led the conference in three-point field goals made in conference games (49) and three-point field goal percentage in conference games (45.8%).

Bullock established the current Big Ten Conference record for career three-point field goals made (339). The record carries an asterisk in the Big Ten Media guide and Pete Lisicky's (332, 1998) name is below Bullock's with a 1 next to it signifying it is the highest recognized total. There is a similar asterisk in the Michigan record book where his name is above Dion Harris's 268 total in 2007. Bullock also ended his career with the highest total number of free throws made (505) in Michigan history, above Cazzie Russell's 486 total set in 1966. Bullock's career free throw percentage of 86.03 surpassed Russell's 82.65 from 1966 and still is above Lester Abram's 82.93 from 2007. Bullock surpassed his 1997 single-season free throw record with a 91.11%.

The team surpassed the 1987 team's 75.0% mark as the best free throw shooting team in school history with a 75.2% average. This stood as the best in school history until 2002. On December 9, 1998, it set the school single-game record by making 34 free throws against the Eastern Michigan. This surpassed the 33 made on January 23, 1971, and was surpassed twice the following season.

Bullock set the career records for minutes played (4356) and games started (129), surpassing Gary Grant’s 1988 totals of 4231 and 128. Both continued to be school bests with Grant holding the highest untarnished totals until 2012 when Zack Novak finished his career with 4357 minutes.

In the 1999 Big Ten Conference men's basketball tournament at the United Center from March 4–7, Michigan was seeded tenth. In the first round they defeated number 7 Purdue 79–73 in overtime. In the second round, they lost to number two Ohio State 87–69.

== Team players drafted into the NBA ==
One player from this team was selected in the NBA draft.

Year	Round	Pick	Overall	Player	NBA club
1999	2	13	42	Louis Bullock	Minnesota Timberwolves

== See also ==
- List of vacated and forfeited games in college basketball
- University of Michigan basketball scandal
