= 1998–99 Illinois Fighting Illini men's basketball team =

American college basketball season

1998–99 Illinois Fighting Illini men's basketball
- Conference: Big Ten Conference
- Record: 14–18 (3–13 Big Ten)
- Head coach: Lon Kruger (3rd season)
- Assistant coaches: Robert McCullum (3rd season); Rob Judson (3rd season); Steve Henson (2nd season)
- MVP: Cory Bradford
- Captain: Victor Chukwudebe
- Home arena: Assembly Hall

1998–99 Big Ten Conference men's basketball standings
	Conf.				Overall
Team	W		L	PCT	W		L	PCT
No. 2 Michigan State†	15	–	1	.938	33	–	5	.868
No. 19 Indiana	9	–	7	.563	23	–	11	.676
No. 18 Wisconsin	9	–	7	.563	22	–	10	.688
No. 21 Iowa	9	–	7	.563	20	–	10	.667
Purdue	7	–	9	.438	21	–	13	.618
Northwestern	6	–	10	.375	15	–	14	.517
Penn State	5	–	11	.313	13	–	14	.481
Illinois	3	–	13	.188	14	–	18	.438
No. 14 Ohio State**	1	–	1	.500	1	–	1	.500
Minnesota***	0	–	8	.000	0	–	11	.000
Michigan*	0	–	11	.000	0	–	19	.000
† 1999 Big Ten tournament winner Rankings from AP poll *Michigan: 12 games vacated due to sanctions against the program **Ohio State: 34 games including 5 NCAA Tourn. games vacated due to sanctions against the program *** Minnesota vacated 17 games including 1 NCAA Tourn. game due to sanctions against the program Disputed records: Michigan: 12–19, 5–11; Ohio State: 27–9, 12–4; Minnesota: 17–11, 8–8

The 1998–99 Illinois Fighting Illini men's basketball team represented the University of Illinois.

== Regular season ==
The Illini closed out the 1998–99 season with an amazing run at the Big Ten tournament title. After entering the tournament as the 11th-seeded team, Illinois reeled off three straight victories over Top 25-ranked teams before losing in the championship game to second-ranked Michigan State. Illini freshman Cory Bradford was the Big Ten's Freshman of the Year and was also selected to the All-Tournament team.

=== Roster ===
1998–99 Illinois Fighting Illini men's basketball team
Players
Coaches

Pos.	#	Name	Height	Weight	Year	Previous school	Hometown
F	00	Victor Chukwudebe (C)	6 ft 7 in (2.01 m)	230 lb (104 kg)	Jr	Lanphier High School	Springfield, Illinois
G	3	Arias Davis	6 ft 2 in (1.88 m)	180 lb (82 kg)	Sr	Ware County High School	Waycross, Georgia
C	4	Fess Hawkins	6 ft 10 in (2.08 m)	270 lb (122 kg)	RS So	Dollarway High School/Westark Community College	Pine Bluff, Arkansas
G	5	Nate Mast	5 ft 10 in (1.78 m)	160 lb (73 kg)	So	Champaign Central High School	Champaign, Illinois
G	12	Joe Cross	6 ft 2 in (1.88 m)	205 lb (93 kg)	So	Carbondale Community High School	Carbondale, Illinois
G	13	Cory Bradford	6 ft 2 in (1.88 m)	200 lb (91 kg)	RS Fr	Raleigh Egypt High School	Memphis, Tennessee
F/C	21	Robert Archibald	6 ft 10 in (2.08 m)	215 lb (98 kg)	Fr	Lafayette High School	Ballwin, Missouri
F	22	Lucas Johnson	6 ft 7 in (2.01 m)	215 lb (98 kg)	Fr	Maine West High School	Des Plaines, Illinois
G	30	Frank Williams	6 ft 3 in (1.91 m)	190 lb (86 kg)	Fr	Manual High School	Peoria, Illinois
F	32	Cleotis Brown	6 ft 4 in (1.93 m)	220 lb (100 kg)	Jr	Russell County School District	Pittsview, Alabama
F	33	Damir Krupalija	6 ft 8 in (2.03 m)	215 lb (98 kg)	Fr	Rockford Boylan High School	Rockford, Illinois
F	35	Carvell Ammons	6 ft 6 in (1.98 m)	205 lb (93 kg)	RS So	Champaign Centennial High School	Champaign, Illinois
G/F	40	Sergio McClain	6 ft 3 in (1.91 m)	215 lb (98 kg)	So	Manual High School	Peoria, Illinois
F	44	Rich Beyers	6 ft 8 in (2.03 m)	230 lb (104 kg)	So	Shelbyville High School	Shelbyville, Illinois

Head coach

- Lon Kruger (Kansas State) (3rd year)

Assistant coach(es)

- Rob Judson (University of Illinois) (3rd year)
- Robert McCullum (Seminole State) (3rd year)
- Steve Henson (Kansas State) (2nd year)

Legend

- (C) Team captain
- (S) Suspended
- (I) Ineligible
- (W) Walk-on
- Injured
- Current redshirt

Roster

== Schedule ==
Date time, TV	Rank^{#}	Opponent^{#}	Result	Record	Site (attendance) city, state
Non-Conference regular season
11/10/1998*		vs. Wake Forest; Coaches Cancer Classic	L 73-75 ^{ot}	0-1	Madison Square Garden (13,239); New York, NY
11/11/1998*		vs. Georgetown; Coaches Cancer Classic	W 65-50	1-1	Madison Square Garden (12,589); New York, NY
11/17/1998*		George Washington	L 58-64	1-2	Assembly Hall (10,683); Champaign, IL
11/20/1998*		St. Louis	W 70-65	2-2	Assembly Hall (12,586); Champaign, IL
11/23/1998*		Tennessee-Martin	W 71-35	3-2	Assembly Hall (10,496); Champaign, IL
11/28/1998*		at Texas-Pan American	W 71-56	4-2	UTPA Fieldhouse (2,463); Edinburg, TX
11/30/1998*		Valparaiso	W 53-49	5-2	Assembly Hall (10,842); Champaign, IL
12/5/1998*		vs. Bradley	W 53-48	6-2	United Center (11,084); Chicago, IL
12/12/1998*		Eastern Illinois	W 70-67	7-2	Assembly Hall (12,273); Champaign, IL
12/19/1998*		vs. No. 13 Kansas	L 55-65	7-3	Kemper Arena (13,728); Kansas City, MO
12/22/1998*		vs. No. 15 Missouri; Braggin' Rights	L 62-67	7-4	Scottrade Center (22,471); St. Louis, MO
12/29/1998*		vs. No. 14 Clemson	W 67-50	8-4	Bi-Lo Center (14,687); Greenville, SC
Big Ten regular season
1/3/1999		at No. 8 Indiana; Rivalry	L 53-62	8-5 (0-1)	Assembly Hall (7,249); Bloomington, IN
1/7/1999		at No. 17 Iowa; Rivalry	L 62-84	8-6 (0-2)	Carver–Hawkeye Arena (14,301); Iowa City, IA
1/9/1999		Northwestern; Rivalry	L 46-59	8-7 (0-3)	Assembly Hall (12,255); Champaign, IL
1/13/1999		at No. 13 Purdue	L 54-63	8-8 (0-4)	Mackey Arena (14,123); West Lafayette, IN
1/16/1999		No. 14 Michigan State	L 49-51	8-9 (0-5)	Assembly Hall (15,428); Champaign, IL
1/20/1999		at No. 15 Wisconsin	L 53-75	8-10 (0-6)	Kohl Center (16,112); Madison, WI
1/23/1999		Penn State	L 61-65	8-11 (0-7)	Assembly Hall (12,552); Champaign, IL
1/28/1999		at Michigan	W 61-59	9-11 (1-7)	Crisler Arena (10,784); Ann Arbor, MI
1/30/1999		No. 15 Ohio State	L 61-64	9-12 (1-8)	Assembly Hall (13,756); Champaign, IL
2/3/1999		at No. 18 Minnesota	L 63-75	9-13 (1-9)	Williams Arena (14,792); Minneapolis, MN
2/6/1999		No. 11 Wisconsin	W 53-51	10-13 (2-9)	Assembly Hall (14,062); Champaign, IL
2/11/1999		at No. 5 Michigan State	L 44-61	10-14 (2-10)	Breslin Student Events Center (14,659); East Lansing, MI
2/13/1999		No. 21 Purdue	L 56-63	10-15 (2-11)	Assembly Hall (15,473); Champaign, IL
2/17/1999		at Northwestern; Rivalry	W 69-63	11-15 (3-11)	Welsh-Ryan Arena (7,314); Evanston, IL
2/21/1999		No. 20 Iowa; Rivalry	L 72-78	11-16 (3-12)	Assembly Hall (16,450); Champaign, IL
2/24/1999		No. 20 Indiana; Rivalry	L 64-70 ^{ot}	11-17 (3-13)	Assembly Hall (16,450); Champaign, IL
Big Ten tournament
3/4/1999*	(11)	vs. (6) No. 23 Minnesota; Opening Round	W 67-64	12-17	United Center (18,641); Chicago, IL
3/5/1999*	(11)	vs. (3) No. 17 Indiana; Quarterfinals	W 82-66	13-17	United Center (20,297); Chicago, IL
3/6/1999*	(11)	vs. (2) No. 11 Ohio State; Semifinals	W 79-77	14-17	United Center (20,695); Chicago, IL
3/7/1999*	(11)	vs. (1) No. 2 Michigan State; Championship	L 50-67	14-18	United Center (19,581); Chicago, IL
*Non-conference game. ^{#}Rankings from AP Poll. (#) Tournament seedings in parentheses. All times are in Central Time.

== Player stats ==
Player	Games Played	2 pt. Field Goals	3 pt. Field Goals	Free Throws	Rebounds	Assists	Blocks	Steals	Points
Cory Bradford	32	89	85	61	84	62	1	25	494
Cleotis Brown	32	87	20	61	152	44	13	52	295
Sergio McClain	31	92	6	65	106	81	3	71	267
Fess Hawkins	32	77	0	47	162	19	36	24	201
Victor Chukwudebe	32	78	0	22	158	16	20	22	178
Lucas Johnson	31	22	15	46	96	45	4	12	135
Damir Krupalija	24	29	6	34	132	25	13	15	110
Robert Archibald	32	32	0	31	100	26	10	10	95
Arias Davis	25	11	18	6	20	10	2	9	82
Nate Mast	31	9	11	14	17	36	0	14	65
Rich Beyers	11	13	4	15	20	10	5	7	43
Carvell Ammons	2	1	0	0	2	1	0	0	2

== Awards and honors ==
- Cory Bradford
  - Big Ten Freshman of the Year
  - Team Most Valuable Player
- Frank Williams
  - Fighting Illini All-Century team (2005)
