= Cory Bradford =

American basketball player (born 1978)

Zhuhai Wolf Warriors
- Position: Shooting guard
- League: ASEAN Basketball League

Personal information
- Born: December 4, 1978 (age 47) Memphis, Tennessee
- Listed height: 6 ft 3 in (1.91 m)
- Listed weight: 200 lb (91 kg)

Career information
- High school: Raleigh-Egypt (Memphis, Tennessee)
- College: Illinois (1997–2002)
- NBA draft: 2002: undrafted
- Playing career: 2002–present

Career history
- 2002–2003: Dakota Wizards
- 2003–2004: Kecskeméti Univer KSE
- 2006–2007: Besançon BCD
- 2007: JDA Dijon
- 2007–2008: Albacomp
- 2008–2009: Achilleas Kaimakli
- 2009: Toros de Aragua
- 2009: Búcaros de Bucaramanga
- 2009–2010: Ángeles de Puebla
- 2009–2010: Al Rayan
- 2010–2011: An Nahl Sharjah
- 2011–2012: Al Moutahed Tripoli
- 2011–2012: Al Ahli Doha
- 2012: Búcaros de Bucaramanga
- 2013: Caribbean Heat de Cartagena
- 2013–2014: Guerreros de Bogotá
- 2014: Applied Science University
- 2015: Cafeteros de Armenia
- 2016: Sabios de Manizales
- 2016–2017: GIE Maile Matrix
- 2017–2018: Bosna Royal
- 2018–2019: Warriors de San Andrés
- 2019: Zhuhai Wolf Warriors
- 2020: Pioneros de Los Mochis

Career highlights
- CBA All-Rookie Team (2003); AP Honorable Mention All-American (2001); Big Ten Freshman of the Year (1999); All-State (1997)
Medals
Men's basketball
Representing United States
Summer Universiade
Gold medal – first place	1999 Palma	Team competition

Cory Bradford (born December 4, 1978) is an American professional basketball player for Zhuhai Wolf Warriors. Bradford, a dominant high school guard, led Memphis's Raleigh-Egypt High School to a 1997 District 2A Championship while averaging 24 points, seven rebounds and six assists per game in his senior season. Bradford, an all-state, all-conference selection, was listed as the 72nd best high school prospect in 1997. He also averaged 22 points and nearly eight rebounds per game as a junior.

Bradford went on to play for the University of Illinois for four years, 1998–2002. He was part of the 2000–01 and 2001–02 back-to-back Big Ten championship teams coached by Bill Self. Each team qualified for the NCAA men's basketball tournament with the 2000–01 team advancing to the Elite Eight. Bradford scored 1,735 career points with 275 assists, 108 steals while having a .389 field goal percentage for the Fighting Illini. Bradford's most prominent claim to fame was his NCAA record for consecutive games with a three-point field goal at 88 games before the streak was snapped on Feb. 13, 2001 against Wisconsin.

== College career ==
=== 1997–98 season ===
Bradford played in one regular season game before making the transition to "redshirt" status.

=== 1998–99 season ===
As a freshman, Bradford appeared in all 32 of the Illini's games. He totaled a record-setting 494 points with 25 steals, 62 assists and hauled in 84 rebounds. Bradford led all Illini players in many scoring categories including total points (494), field goals made (174), field goal attempts (450) and making 85 three-point field goals after attempting 205. Bradford connected on a three-point field goal in each game of the season. Bradford was honored at the end of the season by being named Big Ten Freshman of the Year as well as making the Third-team All-Big Ten by the coaches and the Basketball News All-Freshman second team.

=== 1999–2000 season ===
During Bradford's sophomore season, he again started in all 32 games. He finished the season as the team leader in points (490), three-point field goals (96 of 255) while averaging 15.3 points per game. Bradford continued his streak of consecutive games with a three-point field goal by making one in each game in this season. Under the direction of Lon Kruger, the combination of Bradford and freshmen Frank Williams, Brian Cook and junior Marcus Griffin helped to create a resurgent Illini by finishing the season nationally ranked at 21 by the Associated Press. Bradford would be named to the Second Team All-Big Ten selection by both coaches and media following the season.

=== 2000–01 season ===
The Fighting Illini experienced a new head coach and a change in philosophy led by the play of sophomores Frank Williams and Brian Cook along with senior forward Marcus Griffin, Bradford's role became more focused on what he did best, making three-point baskets. This new direction benefited the Illini by pushing them into a first place tie in the conference as well as a berth in the Elite Eight of the 2001 NCAA tournament and an Associated Press ranking of 4 at the season's end. During the course of the season Bradford made 72 of 194 three-point shots, however, he saw his 88 consecutive game shooting streak snap on Feb. 13, 2001 against Wisconsin. Even with a reduced role, Bradford finished the season with the fourth highest point total averaging 9.9 points per game. As a tribute to Bradford's efforts, he was an Honorable-mention All-America selection by the Associated Press as well as an Honorable-mention All-Big Ten selection by the media.

=== 2001–02 season ===
Bradford's senior season once again saw him start in all 35 games that the Illini played. Bradford would again lead the team in three-point shots made as well as attempted. Along with Frank Williams, Bradford was named the team's captain. Bradford was third on the Fighting Illini in scoring with 406 points (11.6 per game), only trailing Williams and Brian Cook. Through his leadership and accurate shooting, the Illini would repeat as Big Ten champions as well as finishing the season as part of the Sweet Sixteen in the 2002 NCAA tournament. Individually, Bradford finished his four seasons at Illinois with 1,735 points, currently the fifth highest point total in the history of the Fighting Illini, and 327 three-point attempts, currently number one in Illini history.

Season	Games	Points	PPG	Rebounds	RPG	Assists	APG	Steals	SPG	Big Ten Record	Overall Record	Postseason
1998–99	32	494	15.4	84	2.6	62	1.9	25	0.8	3–13	14–18	Big Ten Tourn. Runner-up
1999–2000	32	490	15.3	80	2.5	63	2.0	31	1.0	11–5	22–10	NCAA second round
2000–01	35	345	9.9	89	2.5	63	1.8	23	0.7	13–3	27–8	NCAA Elite Eight
2001–02	35	406	11.6	110	3.1	87	2.5	29	0.8	11–5	26–9	NCAA Sweet Sixteen
Totals	134	1,735	12.9	363	2.7	275	2.0	108	0.8	38–26	89–45	3 appearances

== Professional career ==
Bradford began his career with the Dakota Wizards of the Continental Basketball Association (CBA) during the 2002–03 season. He was named to the CBA All-Rookie Team.
