= 1998–99 Michigan State Spartans men's basketball team =

American college basketball season

1998–99 Michigan State Spartans men's basketball

Pearl Harbor Classic champions Big Ten regular season champions Big Ten tournament champions

NCAA tournament, Final Four
- Conference: Big Ten Conference

Ranking
- Coaches: No. 3
- AP: No. 2
- Record: 33–5 (15–1 Big Ten)
- Head coach: Tom Izzo (4th season)
- Assistant coaches: Tom Crean (4th season); Stan Heath (3rd season); Mike Garland (3rd season)
- Captains: Mateen Cleaves; Antonio Smith; Jason Klein; Thomas Kelley
- Home arena: Breslin Center

1998–99 Big Ten Conference men's basketball standings
	Conf.				Overall
Team	W		L	PCT	W		L	PCT
No. 2 Michigan State†	15	–	1	.938	33	–	5	.868
No. 19 Indiana	9	–	7	.563	23	–	11	.676
No. 18 Wisconsin	9	–	7	.563	22	–	10	.688
No. 21 Iowa	9	–	7	.563	20	–	10	.667
Purdue	7	–	9	.438	21	–	13	.618
Northwestern	6	–	10	.375	15	–	14	.517
Penn State	5	–	11	.313	13	–	14	.481
Illinois	3	–	13	.188	14	–	18	.438
No. 14 Ohio State**	1	–	1	.500	1	–	1	.500
Minnesota***	0	–	8	.000	0	–	11	.000
Michigan*	0	–	11	.000	0	–	19	.000
† 1999 Big Ten tournament winner Rankings from AP poll *Michigan: 12 games vacated due to sanctions against the program **Ohio State: 34 games including 5 NCAA Tourn. games vacated due to sanctions against the program *** Minnesota vacated 17 games including 1 NCAA Tourn. game due to sanctions against the program Disputed records: Michigan: 12–19, 5–11; Ohio State: 27–9, 12–4; Minnesota: 17–11, 8–8

The 1998–99 Michigan State Spartans men's basketball team represented Michigan State University in the 1998–99 NCAA Division I men's basketball season. The team played their home games at Breslin Center in East Lansing, Michigan and were coached by fourth-year head coach, Tom Izzo. The Spartans finished the season 33–5, 15–1 to win the Big Ten regular season championship by three games. MSU defeated Northwestern, Wisconsin, and Illinois to win the Big Ten tournament and received the conference's automatic bid to the NCAA tournament. As the No. 1 seed in the Midwest region, they defeated Mount Saint Mary's and Ole Miss to advance to their second straight Sweet Sixteen. In the Sweet Sixteen they defeated Oklahoma to advance to the school's first Elite Eight since 1979. In the Elite Eight, they defeated Kentucky to earn a trip to the Final Four for the first time since 1979. There they lost to No. 1-ranked Duke. The 33 wins marked a school record for wins in a season.

== Previous season ==
The Spartans finished the 1997–98 season 22–8, 13–3 in Big Ten play to earn a share of the Big Ten regular season championship. They lost in the quarterfinals of the inaugural Big Ten tournament to Minnesota. Michigan State received an at-large bid as a No. 4 seed in the NCAA tournament, their first trip to the Tournament under Tom Izzo. They defeated Eastern Michigan and Princeton to advance to the Sweet Sixteen before losing to No. 1-seeded North Carolina.

== Season summary ==
The Spartans, fresh off their first trip to the Sweet Sixteen since 1990, started the season ranked No. 5 in the country. Michigan State was led by juniors Mateen Cleaves (11.7 points and 7.2 assists per game) and Morris Peterson (13.6 points and 5.7 rebounds per game).

The Spartans played three top seven teams in their first seven games. MSU lost all three: at No. 7 Temple, versus No. 4 Duke at the United Center in Chicago, Illinois, and at No. 1 Connecticut. However, the Spartans finished the non–conference season without another loss and a record of 11–3 while ranked No. 14 in the country.

After losing their first Big Ten game to No. 24 Wisconsin, the Spartans won the remaining 15 games in conference. The wins included wins against No. 19 Minnesota, No. 14 Iowa, at No. 18 Indiana, No. 15 Ohio State, at No. 14 Iowa, at No. 22 Minnesota, No. 17 Purdue, No. 14 Wisconsin, and at No. 23 Purdue. The Spartans won the Big Ten conference regular season by three games with a record of 15–1. MSU finished the regular season ranked No. 2 in the country. (Ohio State, who finished in second place with a 12–4 record, was later forced to vacate 29 games including all conference wins.)

The Spartans earned the No. 1 seed in the Big Ten tournament and faced Northwestern in the quarterfinals. MSU struggled in the game and appeared to be headed toward a second-straight early exit from only the second-ever Big Ten tournament, but Matteen Cleaves hit a clutch shot with 37 second remaining to give MSU a two-point win. In the semifinals, MSU faced No. 19 Wisconsin, the only team that had beaten MSU in the regular season. The Spartans held Wisconsin scoreless for nearly 11 minutes in the second half on their way to 56–41 win. The win propelled the Spartans to the championship game against Cinderalla Illinois, who had finished last in conference, but had made a run to the championship game. With MSU looking to lock up a No. 1 seed in the NCAA Tournament and Illinois looking to simply make the Tournament with a win, the Spartans blew out the Illini 67–50 to win their first Big Ten tournament championship. The win gave the Spartans the conference's automatic bid to the NCAA tournament.

The Spartans were awarded a No. 1 seed in the Midwest Region. In a First Round victory over Mount St. Mary's, MSU used tough defense to hold off the Mountaineers, 76–53. In the Second Round, the Spartans faced No. 9-seeded Mississippi. Michigan State used a late 13–0 run to hold off the upset and defeat the Rebels, 73–66. Cleaves led the Spartans with 18 points as they advanced to their second straight Sweet Sixteen. In the Sweet Sixteen, No. 13-seeded Oklahoma pushed the Spartans and MSU struggled offensively. However, Andre Hutson's 13 points led the Spartans to hard-fought 54–46 win, their 21st straight win. In the Elite Eight for the first time since winning the championship since 1979, MSU faced No. 3-seeded and No. 8-ranked Kentucky. Michigan State trailed by as many 13 points early in the contest, but they fought back to beat Kentucky 73–66 to advance to the Final Four. There, they were re-matched against the overall No. 1 seed, Duke, who had defeated them 73–67 early in the season. With the Spartans riding a 22-game winning streak, Duke was able to beat the Spartans 68–62, ending their season.

== Roster and statistics ==
1998–99 Michigan State Spartans men's basketball team
Name	Class	Pos	Height	Summary
Adam Ballinger	FR	F	6'9"	1.5 Pts, 1.3 Reb, 0.3 Ast
Charlie Bell	SO	G	6"3"	7.8 Pts, 3.8 Reb, 1.0 Ast
Steve Cherry	SO	G	6'6"	0.5 Pts, 0.4 Reb, 0.1 Ast
Mateen Cleaves	JR	G	6'2"	11.7 Pts, 1.6 Reb, 7.2 Ast
Doug Davis	SO	G	6'3"	1.9 Pts, 0.5 Reb, 1.1 Ast
A. J. Granger	SO	F	6'9"	6.6 Pts, 3.9 Reb, 0.6 Ast
Lorenzo Guess	SO	G	6'3"	0.8 Pts, 0.6 Reb, 0.0 Ast
Andre Hutson	SO	F	6'8"	8.9 Pts, 5.2 Reb, 0.6 Ast
Thomas Kelley	SR	G	6'2"	5.1 Pts, 1.2 Reb, 1.3 Ast
Jason Klein	SR	F	6'7"	9.4 Pts, 2.7 Reb, 1.0 Ast
Morris Peterson	JR	F	6'7"	13.6 Pts, 5.7 Reb, 0.9 Ast
Antonio Smith	SR	F	6'8"	6.5 Pts, 8.4 Reb, 1.1 Ast
Brandon Smith	SO	G	5'11"	0.3 Pts, 0.1 Reb, 0.2 Ast

== Schedule and results ==
Date time, TV	Rank^{#}	Opponent^{#}	Result	Record	Site city, state
Exhibition
Nov 4, 1998*	No. 5	Estonia Select Team	W 83–63		Breslin Center (14,569); East Lansing, MI
Nov 10, 1998*	No. 5	Athletes in Action	W 101–79		Breslin Center (14,667); East Lansing, MI
Non-conference regular season
Nov 13, 1998*	No. 5	Northeast Louisiana	W 89–58	1–0	Breslin Center (14,659); East Lansing, MI
Nov 17, 1998*	No. 5	at Oakland	W 96–66	2–0	Athletics Center O'rena (3,405); Auburn Hills, MI
Nov 20, 1998*; ESPN	No. 5	at No. 7 Temple	L 59–60	2–1	Liacouras Center (10,206); Philadelphia, PA
Nov 27, 1998*	No. 7	Central Florida; Coca Cola Spartan Classic semifinals	W 87–64	3–1	Breslin Center; East Lansing, MI
Nov 28, 1998*	No. 7	Western Michigan; Coca Cola Spartan Classic championship	W 87–64	4–1	Breslin Center (14,659); East Lansing, MI
Dec 2, 1998*; ESPN	No. 9	vs. No. 4 Duke; Great Eight	L 67–73	4–2	United Center (19,412); Chicago, IL
Dec 5, 1998*; CBS	No. 9	at No. 1 Connecticut	L 68–82	4–3	Harry A. Gampel Pavilion (10,207); Storrs, CT
Dec 10, 1998*	No. 14	East Tennessee State	W 86–53	5–3	Breslin Center (5,335); East Lansing, MI
Dec 13, 1998*	No. 14	Illinois–Chicago	W 77–33	6–3	Breslin Center (14,659); East Lansing, MI
Dec 21, 1998*	No. 14	vs. Pepperdine; Pearl Harbor Classic	W 79–67	7–3	George Q. Cannon Activities Center; Laie, HI
Dec 22, 1998*	No. 15	vs. Tulsa; Pearl Harbor Classic semifinals	W 68–58	8–3	George Q. Cannon Activities Center; Laie, HI
Dec 23, 1998*	No. 15	vs. Alabama; Pearl Harbor Classic championship	W 75–58	9–3	George Q. Cannon Activities Center; Laie, HI
Dec 30, 1998*	No. 13	North Carolina–Asheville	W 64–39	10–3	Breslin Center (14,659); East Lansing, MI
Jan 2, 1999*; CBS	No. 14	Louisville	W 59–57	11–3	Breslin Center (14,659); East Lansing, MI
Big Ten regular season
Jan 6, 1999; ESPN Regional	No. 12	at No. 24 Wisconsin	L 51–66	11–4 (0–1)	Kohl Center (15,504); Madison, WI
Jan 9, 1999; ESPN Regional	No. 12	Michigan; Rivalry	W 81–67	12–4 (1–1)	Breslin Center (14,659); East Lansing, MI
Jan 13, 1999; ESPN Regional	No. 14	No. 19 Minnesota	W 71–55	13–4 (2–1)	Breslin Center (14,659); East Lansing, MI
Jan 16, 1999; ESPN Regional	No. 14	at Illinois	W 51–49	14–4 (3–1)	Assembly Hall; Champaign, IL
Jan 21, 1999; ESPN	No. 11	No. 14 Iowa	W 80–65	15–4 (4–1)	Breslin Center (14,659); East Lansing, MI
Jan 24, 1999; CBS	No. 11	at No. 18 Indiana	W 73–59	16–4 (5–1)	Assembly Hall (17,436); Bloomington, IN
Jan 27, 1999; ESPN Regional	No. 8	No. 15 Ohio State	W 76–71	17–4 (6–1)	Breslin Center (14,659); East Lansing, MI
Jan 30, 1999; ESPN Regional	No. 8	Northwestern	W 65–48	18–4 (7–1)	Breslin Center (14,659); East Lansing, MI
Feb 2, 1999; ESPN Regional	No. 8	at Penn State	W 70–68	19–4 (8–1)	Bryce Jordan Center (9,736); University Park, PA
Feb 6, 1999; ESPN Regional	No. 8	at No. 14 Iowa	W 95–81	20–4 (9–1)	Carver–Hawkeye Arena (15,500); Iowa City, IA
Feb 11, 1999; ESPN	No. 5	Illinois	W 61–44	21–4 (10–1)	Breslin Center (14,659); East Lansing, MI
Feb 13; 7:00 pm, ESPN	No. 4	at No. 22 Minnesota	W 84–82	22–4 (11–1)	Williams Arena (14,887); Minneapolis, MN
Feb 16, 1999; ESPN	No. 4	No. 17 Purdue	W 82–69	23–4 (12–1)	Breslin Center (14,659); East Lansing, MI
Feb 18, 1999; ESPN	No. 4	at Michigan; Rivalry	W 73–58	24–4 (13–1)	Crisler Arena (13,458); Ann Arbor, MI
Feb 21, 1999; ESPN Regional	No. 3	No. 13 Wisconsin	W 56–51	25–4 (14–1)	Breslin Center (14,659); East Lansing, MI
Feb 27, 1999; CBS	No. 3	at No. 23 Purdue	W 60–46	26–4 (15–1)	Mackey Arena (14,123); West Lafayette, IN
Big Ten tournament
Mar 5, 1999	(1) No. 2	vs. (8) Northwestern quarterfinals	W 61–59	27–4	United Center; Chicago, IL
Mar 6, 1999	(1) No. 2	vs. (4) No. 18 Wisconsin semifinals	W 56–41	28–4	United Center; Chicago, IL
Mar 7, 1999	(1) No. 2	vs. (11) Illinois championship	W 67–50	29–4	United Center (19,581); Chicago, IL
NCAA tournament
Mar 12, 1999; CBS	(1 MW) No. 2	vs. (16 MW) Mount St. Mary's; First Round	W 76–53	30–4	Bradley Center; Milwaukee, WI
Mar 14, 1999; CBS	(1 MW) No. 2	vs. (9 MW) Ole Miss; Second Round	W 74–66	31–4	Bradley Center (18,525); Milwaukee, WI
Mar 19, 1999; CBS	(1 MW) No. 2	vs. (13 MW) Oklahoma; Sweet Sixteen	W 54–46	32–4	Edward Jones Dome; St. Louis, MO
Mar 21, 1999; CBS	(1 MW) No. 2	vs. (3 MW) No. 8 Kentucky; Elite Eight	W 73–66	33–4	Edward Jones Dome (42,519); St. Louis, MO
Mar 27, 1999; CBS	(1 MW) No. 2	vs. (1 E) No. 1 Duke; Final Four	L 62–68	33–5	Tropicana Field (41,340); St. Petersburg, FL
*Non-conference game. ^{#}Rankings from AP Poll. (#) Tournament seedings in parentheses. All times are in Eastern Time; Source.

== Rankings ==
Ranking movement Legend: ██ Increase in ranking. ██ Decrease in ranking. (RV) Received votes but unranked. (NR) Not ranked.
Poll	Pre	Wk 2	Wk 3	Wk 4	Wk 5	Wk 6	Wk 7	Wk 8	Wk 9	Wk 10	Wk 11	Wk 12	Wk 13	Wk 14	Wk 15	Wk 16	Wk 17	Final
AP	5	5	7	9	14	14	15	13	12	14	11	8	8	5	4	3	2	2

== Awards and honors ==
- Mateen Cleaves – All-America selection
- Mateen Cleaves – Big Ten Player of the Year
- Mateen Cleaves – All-Big Ten First Team
- Mateen Cleaves – Chicago Tribune Silver Basketball
- Mateen Cleaves – Most Outstanding Player, Big Ten Conference Basketball Tournament
- Morris Peterson – All-Big Ten First Team
- Antonio Smith – All-Big Ten Third Team
