= 1998–99 Indiana Hoosiers men's basketball team =

American college basketball season

1998–99 Indiana Hoosiers men's basketball

NCAA men's Division I tournament, Round of 32
- Conference: Big Ten Conference

Ranking
- AP: No. 19
- Record: 23–11 (9–7 Big Ten)
- Head coach: Bobby Knight (28th season)
- Assistant coaches: Mike Davis (2nd season); Pat Knight; John Treloar
- Captain: A.J. Guyton
- Home arena: Assembly Hall

1998–99 Big Ten Conference men's basketball standings
	Conf.				Overall
Team	W		L	PCT	W		L	PCT
No. 2 Michigan State†	15	–	1	.938	33	–	5	.868
No. 19 Indiana	9	–	7	.563	23	–	11	.676
No. 18 Wisconsin	9	–	7	.563	22	–	10	.688
No. 21 Iowa	9	–	7	.563	20	–	10	.667
Purdue	7	–	9	.438	21	–	13	.618
Northwestern	6	–	10	.375	15	–	14	.517
Penn State	5	–	11	.313	13	–	14	.481
Illinois	3	–	13	.188	14	–	18	.438
No. 14 Ohio State**	1	–	1	.500	1	–	1	.500
Minnesota***	0	–	8	.000	0	–	11	.000
Michigan*	0	–	11	.000	0	–	19	.000
† 1999 Big Ten tournament winner Rankings from AP poll *Michigan: 12 games vacated due to sanctions against the program **Ohio State: 34 games including 5 NCAA Tourn. games vacated due to sanctions against the program *** Minnesota vacated 17 games including 1 NCAA Tourn. game due to sanctions against the program Disputed records: Michigan: 12–19, 5–11; Ohio State: 27–9, 12–4; Minnesota: 17–11, 8–8

The 1998–99 Indiana Hoosiers men's basketball team represented Indiana University. Their head coach was Bobby Knight, who was in his 28th year. The team played its home games in Assembly Hall in Bloomington, Indiana, and was a member of the Big Ten Conference.

The Hoosiers finished the regular season with an overall record of 23–11 and a conference record of 9–7, finishing 2nd in the Big Ten Conference. After losing to the Fighting Illini in the quarterfinals of the Big Ten tournament, the Hoosiers were invited to dance in the 1999 NCAA tournament. However, IU lost in the second round to St. John's, who advanced to the Elite Eight.

== Roster ==
No.	Name	Position	Ht.	Year	Hometown
4	Luke Recker	G/F	6–6	So.	Auburn, Indiana
10	Antwaan Randle El	G	5–11	Fr.	Riverdale, Illinois
11	Dane Fife	G	6–4	Fr.	Clarkston, Michigan
12	Luke Jimenez	G	6–3	Jr.	Redwood Falls, Minnesota
23	Rob Turner	G	6–4	Sr.	Wilmington, Delaware
24	Michael Lewis	G	6–1	Jr.	Jasper, Indiana
25	A.J. Guyton	G	6–1	Jr.	Peoria, Illinois
30	William Gladness	F	6–8	Sr.	West Memphis, Arkansas
32	Kyle Hornsby	G/F	6–5	RS Fr.	Anacoco, Louisiana
33	Larry Richardson	G	6–8	Jr.	Orange Park, Florida
35	Kirk Haston	F/C	6–10	Fr.	Lobelville, Tennessee
43	Jarrad Odle	F	6–8	FR.	Swayzee, Indiana
44	Lynn Washington	F	6–8	Jr.	San Jose, California
53	Tom Geyer	F	6–8	Fr.	Indianapolis, Indiana

== Schedule/results ==
Date time, TV	Rank^{#}	Opponent^{#}	Result	Record	Site city, state
Regular season
11/7/1998*	No. 22	vs. Seton Hall; NABC Classic	W 83–69	1–0	RCA Dome; Indianapolis
11/8/1998*	No. 22	vs. South Carolina; NABC Classic	W 76–55	2–0	RCA Dome; Indianapolis
11/14/1998*	No. 22	Indiana State	W 76–70	3–0	Assembly Hall; Bloomington, Indiana
11/18/1998*	No. 21	Alabama-Birmingham	W 91–54	4–0	Assembly Hall; Bloomington, Indiana
11/23/1998*	No. 21	vs. Kansas State; Maui Invitational Tournament Quarterfinals	W 71–70	5–0	Lahaina Civic Center; Lahaina, HI
11/24/1998*	No. 17	vs. Utah; Maui Invitational Tournament Semifinals	W 52–49	6–0	Lahaina Civic Center; Lahaina, HI
11/25/1998*	No. 17	vs. Syracuse; Maui Invitational Tournament Championship	L 63–76	6–1	Lahaina Civic Center; Lahaina, HI
12/1/1998*	No. 16	at Notre Dame	W 76–72	7–1	Joyce Center; Notre Dame, Indiana
12/5/1998*	No. 16	Temple	W 63–62	8–1	Assembly Hall; Bloomington, Indiana
12/8/1998*	No. 11	vs. Kentucky; Indiana–Kentucky rivalry	L 61–70 ^{OT}	8–2	Freedom Hall; Louisville, Kentucky
12/11/1998*	No. 11	Boise State; Indiana Classic	W 90–66	9–2	Assembly Hall; Bloomington, Indiana
12/12/1998*	No. 11	Bowling Green State; Indiana Classic	W 81–55	10–2	Assembly Hall; Bloomington, Indiana
12/20/1998*	No. 10	San Francisco	W 106–54	11–2	Assembly Hall; Bloomington, Indiana
12/27/1998*	No. 10	vs. Drake; Union Federal Hoosier Classic	W 102–46	12–2	Market Square Arena; Indianapolis, Indiana
12/28/1998*	No. 10	vs. Ball State; Union Federal Hoosier Classic	W 72–62	13–2	Market Square Arena; Indianapolis, Indiana
12/31/1998	No. 8	at Iowa	L 52–67	13–3 (0–1)	Carver–Hawkeye Arena; Iowa City, Iowa
1/3/1999	No. 8	Illinois; Illinois–Indiana	W 62–53	14–3 (1–1)	Assembly Hall; Bloomington, Indiana
1/5/1999	No. 13	at Michigan	L 70–82	14–4 (1–2)	Crisler Arena; Ann Arbor, Michigan
1/9/1999	No. 13	at Ohio State	L 56–73	14–5 (1–3)	Value City Arena; Columbus, Ohio
1/13/1999	No. 23	Northwestern	W 81–78	15–5 (2–3)	Assembly Hall; Bloomington, Indiana
1/16/1999	No. 23	at Purdue; Rivalry	W 87–76	16–5 (3–3)	Mackey Arena; West Lafayette, Indiana
1/24/1999	No. 18	Michigan State	L 59–73	16–6 (3–4)	Assembly Hall; Bloomington, Indiana
1/26/1999	No. 20	at No. 19 Minnesota	L 83–90 ^{OT}	16–7 (3–5)	Williams Arena; Minneapolis, Minnesota
1/31/1999	No. 20	at Penn State	W 98–95	17–7 (4–5)	Bryce Jordan Center; University Park, Pennsylvania
2/3/1999	No. 21	No. 11 Wisconsin	W 71–60	18–7 (5–5)	Assembly Hall; Bloomington, Indiana
2/9/1999	No. 17	Purdue; Rivalry	L 81–86	18–8 (5–6)	Assembly Hall; Bloomington, Indiana
2/13/1999	No. 17	at Northwestern	W 69–62	19–8 (6–6)	Welsh-Ryan Arena; Evanston, Illinois
2/17/1999	No. 19	Ohio State	L 67–69	19–9 (6–7)	Assembly Hall; Bloomington, Indiana
2/21/1999	No. 19	Michigan	W 73–71	20–9 (7–7)	Assembly Hall; Bloomington, Indiana
2/24/1999	No. 20	at Illinois	W 70–64	21–9 (8–7)	Assembly Hall; Champaign, Illinois
2/27/1999	No. 20	Iowa	W 88–81	22–9 (9–7)	Assembly Hall; Bloomington, Indiana
Big Ten tournament
3/5/1999	No. 17	vs. Illinois; Quarterfinals	L 66–82	22–10 (9–7)	United Center; Chicago
NCAA tournament
3/11/1999*	No. 17 (6)	vs. No. (11) George Washington; First Round	W 108–88	23–10 (9–7)	Orlando Arena; Orlando, Florida
3/13/1999*	No. 17 (6)	vs. No. 9 (3) St. John's; Second Round	L 61–86	23–11 (9–7)	Orlando Arena; Orlando, Florida
*Non-conference game. ^{#}Rankings from AP Poll. (#) Tournament seedings in parentheses.
