= 1998–99 Wisconsin Badgers men's basketball team =

American college basketball season

1998–99 Wisconsin Badgers men's basketball

NCAA Tournament First Round vs. SW Missouri State, L, 32–43
- Conference: Big Ten Conference

Ranking
- AP: No. 18
- Record: 22–10 (9–7 Big Ten)
- Head coach: Dick Bennett (4th season)
- Assistant coach: Brad Soderberg
- Home arena: Kohl Center

1998–99 Big Ten Conference men's basketball standings
	Conf.				Overall
Team	W		L	PCT	W		L	PCT
No. 2 Michigan State†	15	–	1	.938	33	–	5	.868
No. 19 Indiana	9	–	7	.563	23	–	11	.676
No. 18 Wisconsin	9	–	7	.563	22	–	10	.688
No. 21 Iowa	9	–	7	.563	20	–	10	.667
Purdue	7	–	9	.438	21	–	13	.618
Northwestern	6	–	10	.375	15	–	14	.517
Penn State	5	–	11	.313	13	–	14	.481
Illinois	3	–	13	.188	14	–	18	.438
No. 14 Ohio State**	1	–	1	.500	1	–	1	.500
Minnesota***	0	–	8	.000	0	–	11	.000
Michigan*	0	–	11	.000	0	–	19	.000
† 1999 Big Ten tournament winner Rankings from AP poll *Michigan: 12 games vacated due to sanctions against the program **Ohio State: 34 games including 5 NCAA Tourn. games vacated due to sanctions against the program *** Minnesota vacated 17 games including 1 NCAA Tourn. game due to sanctions against the program Disputed records: Michigan: 12–19, 5–11; Ohio State: 27–9, 12–4; Minnesota: 17–11, 8–8

The 1998–99 Wisconsin Badgers men's basketball team represented University of Wisconsin–Madison in the 1998–99 NCAA Division I men's basketball season. The head coach was Dick Bennett, coaching his fourth season with the Badgers. The team played their home games at the Kohl Center in Madison, Wisconsin and was a member of the Big Ten Conference.

== Roster ==
1998–99 Wisconsin Badgers men's basketball team
Players
Coaches

Pos.	#	Name	Height	Weight	Year	Hometown
G/F	3	Duany Duany	6 ft 5 in (1.96 m)	185 lb (84 kg)	RS Jr	Bloomington, IN
G	4	Travon Davis	5 ft 10 in (1.78 m)	185 lb (84 kg)	Fr	Summit, IL
G	5	Hennssy Auriantal	6 ft 1 in (1.85 m)	185 lb (84 kg)	Sr	Montreal
G	10	Jon Bryant	6 ft 2 in (1.88 m)	186 lb (84 kg)	RS Jr	Plymouth, MN
G	11	Sean Mason	6 ft 2 in (1.88 m)	182 lb (83 kg)	RS Sr	Country Club Hills, IL
G	12	Ty Calderwood	6 ft 0 in (1.83 m)	178 lb (81 kg)	RS Sr	Joliet, IL
G	14	John Moriarity (W)	6 ft 5 in (1.96 m)	185 lb (84 kg)	RS Fr	Oostburg, WI
F	15	Andy Kowske	6 ft 8 in (2.03 m)	225 lb (102 kg)	So	Brookfield, WI
F	20	Erik Faust (W)	6 ft 7 in (2.01 m)	200 lb (91 kg)	RS Fr	Arlington Heights, IL
F	21	Robert Smith (I) (redshirt)	6 ft 8 in (2.03 m)	215 lb (98 kg)	Jr	Madison, WI
G	22	Mike Kelley	6 ft 3 in (1.91 m)	190 lb (86 kg)	So	Menomonee Falls, WI
F	30	Maurice Linton	6 ft 7 in (2.01 m)	220 lb (100 kg)	So	Calumet City, IL
F	34	Maurice Sessoms	6 ft 8 in (2.03 m)	235 lb (107 kg)	Fr	Teaneck, NJ
F	40	Charlie Wills	6 ft 8 in (2.03 m)	235 lb (107 kg)	RS Fr	Angola, IN
F	50	Mark Vershaw	6 ft 9 in (2.06 m)	240 lb (109 kg)	So	East Peoria, IL

Head coach

- Dick Bennett (Ripon)

Assistant coach(es)

- Brad Soderberg (Ripon)
- Shawn Hood
- Brian Hecker

Legend

- (C) Team captain
- (S) Suspended
- (I) Ineligible
- (W) Walk-on
- Injured
- Current redshirt

Roster
Last update: 2014-1-14

== Schedule ==
Date time, TV	Rank^{#}	Opponent^{#}	Result	Record	Site city, state
Regular Season
11/14/1998*		Loyola (IL)	W 66–29	1–0	Kohl Center; Madison, WI
11/16/1998*		UW–Milwaukee	W 75–63	2–0	Kohl Center; Madison, WI
11/20/1998*		vs. New Mexico State; Top of the World Classic	L 52–66	2–1	Carlson Center; Fairbanks, AK
11/21/1998*; 6:45 p.m.		vs. Virginia; Top of the World Classic	W 66–56	3–1	Carlson Center (2,744); Fairbanks, AK
11/22/1998*		vs. Nebraska; Top of the World Classic	W 78–41	4–1	Carlson Center; Fairbanks, AK
11/28/1998*		at Rhode Island	W 65–59	5–1	Keaney Gymnasium; Kingston, RI
12/02/1998*		Northern Illinois	W 67–52	6–1	Kohl Center; Madison, WI
12/05/1998*; 8:05 p.m.		at Illinois State	W 71–54	7–1	Redbird Arena (9,533); Normal, IL
12/09/1998*		at No. 16 Temple	W 63–56	8–1	Liacouras Center; Philadelphia, PA
12/12/1998*		Pepperdine	W 57–51	9–1	Kohl Center; Madison, WI
12/15/1998*	No. 23	at Texas	W 65–62	10–1	Frank Erwin Center; Austin, TX
12/23/1998*	No. 20	at Marquette	W 61–45	11–1	Bradley Center; Milwaukee, WI
12/27/1998*	No. 20	Fresno State	W 87–65	12–1	Kohl Center; Madison, WI
12/30/1998	No. 19	at Michigan	L 55–59	12–2 (0–1)	Crisler Arena; Ann Arbor, MI
1/02/1999	No. 19	Ohio State	L 74–78 ^{OT}	12–3 (0–2)	Kohl Center; Madison, WI
1/06/1999	No. 24	No. 12 Michigan State	W 66–51	13–3 (1–2)	Kohl Center; Madison, WI
1/10/1999	No. 24	No. 9 Purdue	W 61–56	14–3 (2–2)	Kohl Center; Madison, WI
1/13/1999	No. 17	at Penn State	W 61–58	15–3 (3–2)	Bryce Jordan Center; University Park, PA
1/16/1999	No. 17	at Northwestern	W 57–49	16–3 (4–2)	Welsh-Ryan Arena; Evanston, IL
1/20/1999	No. 15	Illinois	W 75–53	17–3 (5–2)	Kohl Center; Madison, WI
1/23/1999	No. 15	at No. 14 Iowa	W 72–52	18–3 (6–2)	Carver–Hawkeye Arena; Iowa City, IA
1/30/1999	No. 12	No. 19 Minnesota	W 61–50	19–3 (7–2)	Kohl Center; Madison, WI
2/03/1999	No. 11	at No. 21 Indiana	L 60–71	19–4 (7–3)	Assembly Hall; Bloomington, IN
2/06/1999	No. 11	at Illinois	L 51–53	19–5 (7–4)	Assembly Hall; Champaign, IL
2/10/1999	No. 15	Northwestern	W 57–45	20–5 (8–4)	Kohl Center; Madison, WI
2/13/1999	No. 15	Penn State	W 73–63	21–5 (9–4)	Kohl Center; Madison, WI
2/21/1999	No. 13	at No. 4 Michigan State	L 51–56	21–6 (9–5)	Breslin Student Events Center; East Lansing, MI
2/24/1999	No. 16	at No. 10 Ohio State	L 54–63	21–7 (9–6)	Value City Arena; Columbus, OH
2/27/1999	No. 16	Michigan	L 39–51	21–8 (9–7)	Kohl Center; Madison, WI
Big Ten tournament
3/05/1999	No. 19	vs. No. 20 Iowa; Big Ten tournament - Quarterfinals	W 74–50	22–8	United Center; Chicago, IL
3/06/1999	No. 19	vs. No. 2 Michigan State; Big Ten tournament - Semifinals	L 41–56	22–9	United Center; Chicago, IL
NCAA tournament
3/12/1999*	(5 E) No. 19	vs. (12 E) SW Missouri State; NCAA Tournament - First Round	L 32–43	22–10	Charlotte Coliseum; Charlotte, NC
*Non-conference game. ^{#}Rankings from AP Poll. (#) Tournament seedings in parentheses. E=East.
