= 1999 NCAA Division I men's basketball tournament =

Edition of USA college basketball tournament

- Season: 1998–99
- Teams: 64
- Finals site: Tropicana Field, St. Petersburg, Florida
- Champions: Connecticut Huskies (1st title, 1st title game, 1st Final Four)
- Runner-up: Duke Blue Devils (8th title game, 12th Final Four)
- Semifinalists: Michigan State Spartans (3rd Final Four); Ohio State Buckeyes (Vacated) (9th Final Four)
- Winning coach: Jim Calhoun (1st title)
- MOP: Richard Hamilton (Connecticut)
- Attendance: 720,685
- Top scorer: Richard Hamilton (Connecticut) (145 points)

The 1999 NCAA Division I men's basketball tournament involved 64 schools playing in single-elimination play to determine the national champion of men's NCAA Division I college basketball. The 61st annual edition of the tournament began on March 11, 1999, and ended with the championship game on March 29 at Tropicana Field in St. Petersburg, Florida. A total of 63 games were played. This Final Four was the first—and so far, only—to be held in a baseball-specific facility, as Tropicana Field is home to the Tampa Bay Rays (then known as the Devil Rays).

The Final Four consisted of Connecticut, making its first Final Four appearance; Ohio State, in its ninth Final Four appearance and first since 1968; Michigan State, its third Final Four appearance and first since the 1979 national championship season; and Duke, the overall number one seed in its first Final Four appearance since losing the national championship game in 1994.

In the national championship game, Connecticut defeated Duke 77–74 to win its first national championship, snapping Duke's 32-game winning streak, and scoring the biggest point-spread upset in championship game history. Duke nonetheless tied the record for most games won during a single season, with 37, which they co-held until Kentucky's 38-win seasons in 2011–12 and 2014–15. The 2007–08 Memphis team actually broke this record first, but the team was forced to vacate the entire season due to eligibility issues surrounding the team.

Richard "Rip" Hamilton of Connecticut was named the tournament's Most Outstanding Player. This was a significant victory for the program, as it cemented Connecticut's reputation as a true basketball power after a decade of barely missing the Final Four.

This tournament is also historically notable as the coming-out party for Gonzaga as a rising mid-major power. Gonzaga has made every NCAA tournament since then and is now generally considered to be a high-major program despite its mid-major conference affiliation. Gonzaga is expected to join the newly revamped Pac-12 Conference in the 2025–26 academic year.

Due to violations committed by Ohio State head coach Jim O'Brien, the Buckeyes were forced to vacate their appearance in the 1999 Final Four.

== Schedule and venues ==
1999 first and second rounds
1999 Regionals (blue) and Final Four (red)

The following are the sites that were selected to host each round of the 1999 tournament:

First and Second Rounds

- March 11 and 13
  - South Region
    - RCA Dome, Indianapolis, Indiana (Hosts: Butler University, Midwestern Collegiate Conference)
    - Orlando Arena, Orlando, Florida (Host: Stetson University)
  - West Region
    - McNichols Sports Arena, Denver, Colorado (Hosts: Western Athletic Conference, Colorado State University)
    - KeyArena, Seattle, Washington (Host: University of Washington)
- March 12 and 14
  - East Region
    - FleetCenter, Boston, Massachusetts (Host: Boston College)
    - Charlotte Coliseum, Charlotte, North Carolina (Host: University of North Carolina at Charlotte)
  - Midwest Region
    - Bradley Center, Milwaukee, Wisconsin (Host: Marquette University)
    - Louisiana Superdome, New Orleans, Louisiana (Host: Tulane University)

Regional semifinals and finals (Sweet Sixteen and Elite Eight)

- March 18 and 20
  - South Regional, Thompson–Boling Arena, Knoxville, Tennessee (Host: University of Tennessee)
  - West Regional, America West Arena, Phoenix, Arizona (Host: Arizona State University)
- March 19 and 21
  - East Regional, Continental Airlines Arena, East Rutherford, New Jersey (Hosts: Seton Hall University, Big East Conference)
  - Midwest Regional, Trans World Dome, St. Louis, Missouri (Host: Missouri Valley Conference)

National semifinals and championship (Final Four and championship)

- March 27 and 29
  - Tropicana Field, St. Petersburg, Florida (Hosts: University of South Florida, Conference USA)

== Teams ==
There were 30 automatic bids awarded to the tournament - of these, 28 were given to the winners of their conference's tournament, while two were awarded to the team with the best regular-season record in their conference (Ivy League and Pac-10).

Five conference champions made their first NCAA tournament appearances: Arkansas State (Sun Belt), Florida A&M (MEAC), Kent State (MAC), Samford (TAAC), and Winthrop (Big South).

=== Automatic qualifiers ===
Automatic qualifiers
Conference	Team	Appearance	Last bid
ACC	Duke	23rd	1998
America East	Delaware	4th	1998
Atlantic 10	Rhode Island	8th	1998
Big 12	Kansas	28th	1998
Big East	Connecticut	20th	1998
Big Sky	Weber State	12th	1995
Big South	Winthrop	1st	Never
Big Ten	Michigan State	13th	1998
Big West	New Mexico State	15th	1994
CAA	George Mason	2nd	1989
Conference USA	UNC Charlotte	7th	1998
Ivy League	Penn	17th	1995
MAAC	Siena	2nd	1989
MAC	Kent State	1st	Never
MCC	Detroit	5th	1998
MEAC	Florida A&M	1st	Never
Mid-Continent	Valparaiso	4th	1998
Missouri Valley	Creighton	10th	1991
NEC	Mount St. Mary's	2nd	1995
Ohio Valley	Murray State	10th	1998
Pac-10	Stanford	8th	1998
Patriot	Lafayette	2nd	1957
SEC	Kentucky	40th	1998
Southern	College of Charleston	4th	1998
Southland	UTSA	2nd	1988
SWAC	Alcorn State	5th	1984
Sun Belt	Arkansas State	1st	Never
TAAC	Samford	1st	Never
WAC	Utah	21st	1998
West Coast	Gonzaga	2nd	1995

=== Listed by region and seeding ===
East Regional – Continental Airlines Arena, East Rutherford, New Jersey
Seed	School	Conference	Record	Berth type
1	Duke	ACC	32–1	Automatic
2	Miami (FL)	Big East	22–6	At-Large
3	Cincinnati	Conference USA	26–5	At-Large
4	Tennessee	SEC	20–8	At-Large
5	Wisconsin	Big Ten	22–9	At-Large
6	Temple	Atlantic 10	21–10	At-Large
7	Texas	Big 12	19–12	At-Large
8	College of Charleston	Southern	28–2	Automatic
9	Tulsa	WAC	22–9	At-Large
10	Purdue	Big Ten	19–12	At-Large
11	Kent State	MAC	23–6	Automatic
12	Southwest Missouri State	Missouri Valley	20–10	At-Large
13	Delaware	America East	25–5	Automatic
14	George Mason	CAA	19–10	Automatic
15	Lafayette	Patriot	22–7	Automatic
16	Florida A&M	MEAC	12–18	Automatic

Midwest Regional – Trans World Dome, St. Louis, Missouri
Seed	School	Conference	Record	Berth type
1	Michigan State	Big Ten	29–4	Automatic
2	Utah	WAC	27–4	Automatic
3	Kentucky	SEC	25–8	Automatic
4	Arizona (vacated)	Pac-10	22–6	At-Large
5	UNC Charlotte	Conference USA	22–10	Automatic
6	Kansas	Big 12	22–9	Automatic
7	Washington	Pac-10	17–11	At-Large
8	Villanova	Big East	21–10	At-Large
9	Ole Miss	SEC	19–13	At-Large
10	Miami (OH)	MAC	22–7	At-Large
11	Evansville	Missouri Valley	23–9	At-Large
12	Rhode Island	Atlantic 10	20–10	Automatic
13	Oklahoma	Big 12	20–10	At-Large
14	New Mexico State	Big West	23–9	Automatic
15	Arkansas State	Sun Belt	18–11	Automatic
16	Mount St. Mary's	NEC	15–14	Automatic

South Regional – Thompson–Boling Arena, Knoxville, Tennessee
Seed	School	Conference	Record	Berth type
1	Auburn	SEC	27–3	At-Large
2	Maryland	ACC	26–5	At-Large
3	St. John's	Big East	25–8	At-Large
4	Ohio State (vacated)	Big Ten	23–8	At-Large
5	UCLA (vacated)	Pac-10	22–8	At-Large
6	Indiana	Big Ten	22–10	At-Large
7	Louisville	Conference USA	19–10	At-Large
8	Syracuse	Big East	21–11	At-Large
9	Oklahoma State	Big 12	22–10	At-Large
10	Creighton	Missouri Valley	21–8	Automatic
11	George Washington	Atlantic 10	20–8	At-Large
12	Detroit	MCC	24–5	Automatic
13	Murray State	Ohio Valley	27–5	Automatic
14	Samford	TAAC	24–5	Automatic
15	Valparaiso	Mid-Continent	23–8	Automatic
16	Winthrop	Big South	17–13	Automatic

West Regional – America West Arena, Phoenix, Arizona
Seed	School	Conference	Record	Berth type
1	Connecticut	Big East	28–2	Automatic
2	Stanford	Pac-10	25–6	Automatic
3	North Carolina	ACC	24–9	At-Large
4	Arkansas	SEC	22–10	At-Large
5	Iowa	Big Ten	18–9	At-Large
6	Florida	SEC	20–8	At-Large
7	Minnesota	Big Ten	17–10	At-Large
8	Missouri	Big 12	20–8	At-Large
9	New Mexico	WAC	24–8	At-Large
10	Gonzaga	West Coast	25–6	Automatic
11	Penn	Ivy League	21–5	Automatic
12	UAB	Conference USA	20–11	At-Large
13	Siena	MAAC	25–5	Automatic
14	Weber State	Big Sky	24–7	Automatic
15	Alcorn State	SWAC	23–6	Automatic
16	UTSA	Southland	18–10	Automatic

== Bids by conference ==
Bids by Conference
Bids	Conference(s)
7	Big Ten
6	SEC
5	Big 12, Big East
4	C-USA, Pac-10
3	Atlantic 10, ACC, Missouri Valley, WAC
2	Mid-American
1	19 others

== Bracket ==
=== East Regional – East Rutherford, New Jersey ===
First round
1	Duke	99
16	Florida A&M	58
Charlotte
8	College of Charleston	53
9	Tulsa	62
5	Wisconsin	32
12	SW Missouri St.	43
Charlotte
4	Tennessee	62
13	Delaware	52
6	Temple	61
11	Kent St.	54
Boston
3	Cincinnati	72
14	George Mason	48
7	Texas	54
10	Purdue	58
Boston
2	Miami-FL	75
15	Lafayette	54

Quarter-finals
1	Duke	97
9	Tulsa	56
12	SW Missouri St.	81
4	Tennessee	51
6	Temple	64
3	Cincinnati	54
10	Purdue	73
2	Miami-FL	63

Regional semifinals
1	Duke	78
12	SW Missouri St.	61
6	Temple	77
10	Purdue	55

Regional Finals
1	Duke	85
6	Temple	64

==== Regional Final summary ====
CBS

Sunday, March 21

box score

#1 Duke Blue Devils 85, #6 Temple Owls 64
Scoring by half: 43–31, 42–33
Pts: T. Langdon – 23; Rebs: E. Brand – 8 Asts: C. Carrawell – 7	Pts: L. Barnes, M. Karcher – 19; Rebs: L. Barnes – 8 Asts: P. Sánchez – 4

Continental Airlines Arena – East Rutherford, NJ
Attendance: 19,557
Referees: Frankie Bourdeaux, Ted Valentine, Scott Thornley

=== Midwest Regional – St. Louis, Missouri ===
First round
1	Michigan State	76
16	Mount St. Mary's	53
Milwaukee
8	Villanova	70
9	Ole Miss	72
5	Charlotte	81^{OT}
12	Rhode Island	70
Milwaukee
4	Arizona	60
13	Oklahoma	61
6	Kansas	95
11	Evansville	74
New Orleans
3	Kentucky	82
14	New Mexico State	60
7	Washington	58
10	Miami-OH	59
New Orleans
2	Utah	80
15	Arkansas State	58

Quarter-finals
1	Michigan State	74
9	Ole Miss	66
5	Charlotte	72
13	Oklahoma	85
6	Kansas	88
3	Kentucky	92^{OT}
10	Miami-OH	66
2	Utah	58

Regional semifinals
1	Michigan State	54
13	Oklahoma	46
3	Kentucky	58
10	Miami-OH	43

Regional Finals
1	Michigan State	73
3	Kentucky	66

==== Regional Final summary ====
CBS

Sunday, March 21

box score

#1 Michigan State Spartans 73, #3 Kentucky Wildcats 66
Scoring by half: 35–36, 38–30
Pts: M. Peterson – 19; Rebs: M. Peterson – 10; Asts: M. Cleaves – 7	Pts: H. Evans, T. Prince – 12; Rebs: H. Evans – 6 Asts: W. Turner – 8

Trans World Dome – St. Louis, MO
Attendance: 42,519
Referees: Jim Burr, Bob Donato, Reggie Greenwood

=== South Regional – Knoxville, Tennessee ===
First round
1	Auburn	80
16	Winthrop	41
Indianapolis
8	Syracuse	61
9	Oklahoma State	69
5	UCLA	53
12	Detroit Mercy	56
Indianapolis
4	~~Ohio State~~	72
13	Murray State	58
6	Indiana	108
11	George Washington	88
Orlando
3	St. John's	69
14	Samford	43
7	Louisville	58
10	Creighton	62
Orlando
2	Maryland	82
15	Valparaiso	60

Quarter-finals
1	Auburn	81
9	Oklahoma State	74
12	Detroit Mercy	44
4	~~Ohio State~~	75
6	Indiana	61
3	St. John's	86
10	Creighton	63
2	Maryland	75

Regional semifinals
1	Auburn	64
4	~~Ohio State~~	72
3	St. John's	76
2	Maryland	62

Regional Finals
4	~~Ohio State~~	77
3	St. John's	74

==== Regional Final summary ====
CBS

Saturday, March 20

box score

#4 ~~Ohio State Buckeyes~~ 77, #3 St. John's Red Storm 74
Scoring by half: 41–33, 36–41
Pts: S. Penn – 22; Rebs: S. Penn – 8 Asts: S. Penn – 8	Pts: L. Postell – 24; Rebs: L. Postell, R. Artest – 9 Asts: E. Barkley – 7

Thompson–Boling Arena – Knoxville, TN
Attendance: 24,248
Referees: Dave Libbey, Gene Monje, Mark Whitehead

=== West Regional – Phoenix, Arizona ===
First round
1	Connecticut	91
16	UTSA	66
Denver
8	Missouri	59
9	New Mexico	61
5	Iowa	77
12	UAB	64
Denver
4	Arkansas	94
13	Siena	80
6	Florida	75
11	Pennsylvania	61
Seattle
3	North Carolina	74
14	Weber State	76
7	Minnesota	63
10	Gonzaga	75
Seattle
2	Stanford	69
15	Alcorn State	57

Quarter-finals
1	Connecticut	78
9	New Mexico	56
5	Iowa	82
4	Arkansas	72
6	Florida	82^{OT}
14	Weber State	74
10	Gonzaga	82
2	Stanford	74

Regional semifinals
1	Connecticut	78
5	Iowa	68
6	Florida	72
10	Gonzaga	73

Regional Finals
1	Connecticut	67
10	Gonzaga	62

=== Game summaries ===
==== First Round ====
CBS

Thursday, March 11
10:15 pm

#1 Connecticut Huskies 91, #16 UTSA Roadrunners 66
Scoring by half: 52–27, 39–39
Pts: R. Hamilton – 28; Rebs: K. Freeman – 8 Asts: K. El-Amin – 10	Pts: S. Meyer – 18; Rebs: M. Powers – 8 Asts: S. Meyer, J. Riley – 3

McNichols Sports Arena – Denver, CO
Attendance: 16,237
Referees: Mark Whitehead, Larry Lembo, Robert Staffen

==== Second Round ====
CBS

Saturday, March 13
2:20 pm

#1 Connecticut Huskies 78, #9 New Mexico Lobos 56
Scoring by half: 37–22, 41–34
Pts: K. El-Amin, R. Hamilton – 21; Rebs: J. Voskuhl – 9 Asts: E.J. Harrison – 3	Pts: D. Walker – 21; Rebs: K. Thomas – 11; Asts: J. Harrison II – 6

McNichols Sports Arena – Denver, CO
Attendance: 16,237
Referees: Frank Scagliotta, Gerald Boudreaux, Phil Bova

==== Regional Semifinals ====
CBS

Thursday, March 18
10:27 pm

#1 Connecticut Huskies 78, #5 Iowa Hawkeyes 68
Scoring by half: 40–35, 38–33
Pts: R. Hamilton – 24; Rebs: K. Freeman – 6 Asts: K. El-Amin, R. Moore – 5	Pts: J. R. Koch – 14; Rebs: J. Bauer, G. Rucker, J. Settles – 6 Asts: J. Bauer, D. Oliver, J. Settles – 2

America West Arena – Phoenix, AZ
Attendance: 17,975
Referees: Jody Silvester, Frank Bosone, John Sweeney

==== Regional Final ====
CBS

Saturday, March 20
3:40 pm

box score

#1 Connecticut Huskies 67, #10 Gonzaga Bulldogs 62
Scoring by half: 31–32, 36–30
Pts: R. Hamilton – 21; Rebs: K. Freeman – 15; Asts: K. El-Amin – 4	Pts: Q. Hall – 18; Rebs: Q. Hall, C. Calvary – 8 Asts: M. Santangelo, R. Floyd, R. Frahm – 2

America West Arena – Phoenix, AZ
Attendance: 18,053
Referees: Mike Patterson, Larry Rose, Bobby Hunt

== Final Four ==
=== St. Petersburg, Florida ===
National semifinals
E1	Duke	68
MW1	Michigan State	62
S4	~~Ohio State~~	58
W1	Connecticut	64

National Championship Game
E1	Duke	74
W1	Connecticut	77

Ohio State vacated 34 games, including all NCAA Tournament wins from the 1998–99 season due to the Jim O’Brien scandal. Unlike forfeiture, a vacated game does not result in the other school being credited with a win, only with Ohio State removing the wins from its own record.

=== Game summaries ===
==== Final four ====
CBS

Saturday, March 27
5:42 pm

box score

#W1 Connecticut Huskies 64, #S4 ~~Ohio State Buckeyes~~ 58
Scoring by half: 36–35, 28–23
Pts: R. Hamilton – 24; Rebs: Ricky Moore – 8 Asts: K. El-Amin – 6	Pts: M. Redd – 15; Rebs: M. Redd – 8 Asts: J. Singleton, S. Penn – 4

Tropicana Field – St. Petersburg, FL
Attendance: 41,340
Referees: Jim Burr, Larry Rose, Mark Whitehead

CBS

Saturday, March 27
8:00 pm

box score

#E1 Duke Blue Devils 68, #MW1 Michigan State Spartans 62
Scoring by half: 32–20, 36–42
Pts: E. Brand – 18; Rebs: E. Brand – 15; Asts: T. Langdon – 3	Pts: M. Peterson – 15; Rebs: A. Smith – 10; Asts: M. Cleaves – 10

Tropicana Field – St. Petersburg, FL
Attendance: 41,340
Referees: Dave Libbey, Curtis Shaw, John Cahill

==== National Championship ====
CBS

Monday, March 29
9:18 pm

Box score

#1 Connecticut Huskies 77, #1 Duke Blue Devils 74
Scoring by half: 37–39, 40–35
Pts: R. Hamilton – 27; Rebs: Ricky Moore, K. Freeman – 8 Asts: K. El-Amin – 4	Pts: T. Langdon – 25; Rebs: E. Brand – 13; Asts: W. Avery – 5

Tropicana Field – St. Petersburg, FL
Attendance: 41,340
Referees: Tim Higgins, Gerald Boudreaux, Scott Thornley

== Media coverage ==
=== Television ===
CBS Sports

- Greg Gumbel served as the studio host, joined by analyst Clark Kellogg.

=== Commentary teams ===
- Jim Nantz/Billy Packer/Bonnie Bernstein – First & Second Round at New Orleans, Louisiana; Midwest Regional at St. Louis; Final Four at St. Petersburg, Florida
- Sean McDonough/Bill Raftery/Michele Tafoya – First & Second Round at Indianapolis, Indiana; South Regional at Knoxville, Tennessee
- Verne Lundquist/Al McGuire/Armen Keteyian – First & Second Round at Charlotte, North Carolina; East Regional at East Rutherford, New Jersey
- Gus Johnson/Dan Bonner/Barry Booker – First & Second Round at Orlando, Florida; West Regional at Phoenix, Arizona
- Tim Brando/James Worthy/Beth Mowins – First & Second Round at Milwaukee, Wisconsin
- Kevin Harlan/Jon Sundvold/Mike Harris – First & Second Round at Seattle, Washington
- Ian Eagle/Jim Spanarkel/Mike Mayock – First & Second Round at Denver, Colorado
- Craig Bolerjack/Rolando Blackman/Jimmy Dykes – First & Second Round at Boston, Massachusetts

=== Radio ===
Westwood One

==== First and Second Rounds ====
- – East Region First and Second Rounds at Charlotte, North Carolina
- – East Region First and Second Rounds at Boston, Massachusetts
- – Midwest Region First and Second Rounds at Milwaukee, Wisconsin
- – Midwest Region First and Second Rounds at New Orleans, Louisiana
- – South Region First and Second Rounds at Indianapolis, Indiana
- – South Region First and Second Rounds at Orlando, Florida
- – West Region First and Second Rounds at Denver, Colorado
- – West Region First and Second Rounds at Seattle, Washington

==== Regionals ====
- – East Regional at East Rutherford, New Jersey
- – Midwest Regional at St. Louis, Missouri
- – South Regional at Knoxville, Tennessee
- – West Regional at Phoenix, Arizona

==== Final Four and National Championship ====
- Marty Brennaman and Ron Franklin – (Connecticut–Ohio State) Final Four at St. Petersburg, Florida
- John Rooney and Bill Raftery – (Duke–Michigan State) Final Four and National Championship Game at St. Petersburg, Florida

=== Local Radio ===
East Regional – East Rutherford: Seed / School / Radio / Play-by-play / Color commentator / Studio host; 1; Midwest Regional – St. Louis: Seed / School / Radio / Play-by-play / Color commentator / Studio host; 1
South Regional – Knoxville: Seed / School / Radio / Play-by-play / Color commentator / Studio host; 1	West Regional – Phoenix: Seed / School / Radio / Play-by-play / Color commentator / Studio host; 1 / Connecticut / WTIC–AM 1080 (Connecticut) / Joe D'Ambrosio / Wayne Norman

== Additional notes ==
- Despite their loss in the finals to Connecticut, the 1998–1999 Duke team won 37 games. This tied them with Duke's 1985–86 team, UNLV's 1986–87 squad, and later, Illinois' 2004–05 team and Kansas's 2007–08 team, for the most wins in a season, until their record was broken by the 38-win Memphis team in 2007–08. However, as the NCAA vacated Memphis' 2007–2008 season due to the ineligibility of Derrick Rose, they reclaimed the 37-win record. The mark would once again be raised to 38 wins after Kentucky's dominant title run in 2012, which then tied with Kentucky's 2014–15 team. Only one of the first 5 teams to be the winningest single-season teams won a national championship; UNLV's squad lost in the national semifinal to Indiana, and the other teams lost in the finals, to Louisville, UConn, and North Carolina, while Kansas defeated Memphis in the 2008 national championship game. Kentucky's 2014–15 squad suffered their only loss that season in the national semifinal to Wisconsin.
- Connecticut's victory in the finals marks the biggest upset in Championship Game history in the NCAA tournament, as they were 9.5-point underdogs in the contest despite having compiled a 33–2 record going into the Championship game, including a 14–2 record in the tough Big East Conference. In fact, Connecticut had spent more weeks as the number 1 team in the country, according to the AP Top 25 Poll, than had Duke. The previous record was held by Villanova, who defeated Georgetown as 9-point underdogs in 1985.
- The 1999 Final Four would be the last time Tropicana Field would host NCAA tournament games. For Duke, they had 2 straight promising seasons end on the Tropicana Field floor, with an 86–84 loss to Kentucky in the 1998 South Regional final, and then the 1999 National Championship game.
- North Carolina lost to Weber State which marked the first time the Tar Heels had lost in the first round of the expanded field era with 64 or more teams.
- This is the only tournament in which all four 7-seeds lost in the first round to their 10-seeded opponents.

== See also ==
- 1999 NCAA Division II men's basketball tournament
- 1999 NCAA Division III men's basketball tournament
- 1999 NCAA Division I women's basketball tournament
- 1999 NCAA Division II women's basketball tournament
- 1999 NCAA Division III women's basketball tournament
- 1999 National Invitation Tournament
- 1999 Women's National Invitation Tournament
- 1999 NAIA Division I men's basketball tournament
- 1999 NAIA Division II men's basketball tournament
