= 1998–99 Iowa Hawkeyes men's basketball team =

American college basketball season

1998–99 Iowa Hawkeyes men's basketball

Hawkeye Invitational champion

NCAA men's Division I tournament, Sweet Sixteen
- Conference: Big Ten Conference

Ranking
- Coaches: No. 15
- AP: No. 21
- Record: 20–10 (9–7 Big Ten)
- Head coach: Tom Davis (13th season)
- Assistant coach: Gary Close
- MVPs: Kent McCausland; Dean Oliver; Jess Settles
- Home arena: Carver-Hawkeye Arena

1998–99 Big Ten Conference men's basketball standings
	Conf.				Overall
Team	W		L	PCT	W		L	PCT
No. 2 Michigan State†	15	–	1	.938	33	–	5	.868
No. 19 Indiana	9	–	7	.563	23	–	11	.676
No. 18 Wisconsin	9	–	7	.563	22	–	10	.688
No. 21 Iowa	9	–	7	.563	20	–	10	.667
Purdue	7	–	9	.438	21	–	13	.618
Northwestern	6	–	10	.375	15	–	14	.517
Penn State	5	–	11	.313	13	–	14	.481
Illinois	3	–	13	.188	14	–	18	.438
No. 14 Ohio State**	1	–	1	.500	1	–	1	.500
Minnesota***	0	–	8	.000	0	–	11	.000
Michigan*	0	–	11	.000	0	–	19	.000
† 1999 Big Ten tournament winner Rankings from AP poll *Michigan: 12 games vacated due to sanctions against the program **Ohio State: 34 games including 5 NCAA Tourn. games vacated due to sanctions against the program *** Minnesota vacated 17 games including 1 NCAA Tourn. game due to sanctions against the program Disputed records: Michigan: 12–19, 5–11; Ohio State: 27–9, 12–4; Minnesota: 17–11, 8–8

The 1998–99 Iowa Hawkeyes men's basketball team represented the University of Iowa as members of the Big Ten Conference. The team was led by head coach Tom Davis, coaching in his 13th and final season at the school, and played their home games at Carver-Hawkeye Arena. They finished the season 20–10 overall and 9–7 in Big Ten play. The Hawkeyes received an at-large bid to the NCAA tournament as #5 seed in the West Region, losing in the Sweet Sixteen to the eventual National Champion UConn Huskies. This was the last time that Iowa has made a Sweet 16, until 2026 when Iowa beat the defending #1 seed, national champion, Florida Gators.

== Roster ==
1998–99 Iowa Hawkeyes men's basketball team
Players
Coaches

Pos.	#	Name	Height	Weight	Year	Hometown
G	3	Jason Bauer	6 ft 3 in (1.91 m)	—	Sr	Hudson, Iowa
F	4	Jess Settles	6 ft 7 in (2.01 m)	—	RS Sr	Winfield, Iowa
F	5	Sam Okey	6 ft 7 in (2.01 m)	—	RS Sr	Cassville, Wisconsin
G		Jason Price	6 ft 0 in (1.83 m)	—	Jr	Chicago, Illinois
F/C	13	Guy Rucker	6 ft 11 in (2.11 m)	—	Jr	Inkster, Michigan
C	14	Jacob Jaacks	6 ft 10 in (2.08 m)	—	Jr	Cedar Rapids, Iowa
G	20	Dean Oliver	5 ft 11 in (1.8 m)	—	So	Mason City, Iowa
F	23	Duez Henderson	6 ft 7 in (2.01 m)	—	Fr	Detroit, Michigan
G	24	Ryan Luehrsmann	5 ft 11 in (1.8 m)	—	Jr	Cedar Rapids, Iowa
F	25	Rod Thompson	6 ft 6 in (1.98 m)	—	Fr	Galesburg, Illinois
G	30	Kyle Galloway (redshirt)	6 ft 6 in (1.98 m)	190 lb (86 kg)	So	Sioux City, Iowa
G	32	Kent McCausland	6 ft 3 in (1.91 m)	—	Sr	Waterloo, Iowa
G	34	Joey Range	6 ft 5 in (1.96 m)	—	Fr	Galesburg, Illinois
F	44	J. R. Koch	6 ft 10 in (2.08 m)	—	Sr	Morton, Illinois

Head coach

- Tom Davis (UW–Platteville)

Assistant coach(es)

- Gary Close

Legend

- (C) Team captain
- (S) Suspended
- (I) Ineligible
- (W) Walk-on
- Injured
- Current redshirt

== Schedule and results ==
Date time, TV	Rank^{#}	Opponent^{#}	Result	Record	Site city, state
Non-conference regular season
11/15/1998*		vs. Western Illinois	W 74–63	1–0	The MARK of the Quad Cities (7,280); Moline, IL
11/19/1998*		Northern Iowa; Iowa Big Four	W 83–67	2–0	Carver-Hawkeye Arena (14,560); Iowa City, IA
11/25/1998*		Creighton	L 73–75	2–1	Carver-Hawkeye Arena; Iowa City, IA
12/1/1998*		Drake; Iowa Big Four	W 78–74	3–1	Knapp Center; Des Moines, IA
12/4/1998*		South Alabama; Hawkeye Invitational	W 82–58	4–1	Carver-Hawkeye Arena (10,941); Iowa City, IA
12/5/1998*		Detroit Mercy; Hawkeye Invitational	W 61–60	5–1	Carver-Hawkeye Arena (10,978); Iowa City, IA
12/8/1998*; 8:35 pm, ESPN		at No. 10 Kansas	W 85–81	6–1	Allen Fieldhouse; Lawrence, KS
12/12/1998*		Iowa State; Rivalry	W 74–54	7–1	Carver-Hawkeye Arena (15,500); Iowa City, IA
12/19/1998*; 7:05 pm	No. 25	Missouri	W 82–68	8–1	Carver-Hawkeye Arena; Iowa City, IA
12/23/1998*	No. 21	Coppin State	W 87–73	9–1	Carver-Hawkeye Arena; Iowa City, IA
Big Ten Regular Season
12/31/1998	No. 21	No. 8 Indiana	W 67–52	10–1 (1–0)	Carver-Hawkeye Arena; Iowa City, IA
1/3/1999	No. 21	Northwestern	W 52–48	11–1 (2–0)	Welsh-Ryan Arena; Evanston, IL
1/7/1999	No. 17	Illinois	W 84–62	12–1 (3–0)	Carver-Hawkeye Arena; Iowa City, IA
1/12/1999	No. 12	No. 21 Ohio State	W 71–68	13–1 (4–0)	Carver-Hawkeye Arena; Iowa City, IA
1/16/1999	No. 12	at No. 19 Minnesota	L 70–75	13–2 (4–1)	Williams Arena; Minneapolis, MN
1/21/1999; ESPN	No. 14	at No. 11 Michigan State	L 65–80	13–3 (4–2)	Breslin Student Events Center; East Lansing, MI
1/23/1999	No. 14	No. 15 Wisconsin	L 52–72	13–4 (4–3)	Carver-Hawkeye Arena; Iowa City, IA
1/27/1999	No. 16	Penn State	W 84–74	14–4 (5–3)	Carver-Hawkeye Arena; Iowa City, IA
1/30/1999	No. 16	at Michigan	W 81–68	15–4 (6–3)	Crisler Arena; Ann Arbor, MI
2/4/1999	No. 14	at No. 18 Purdue	L 75–90	15–5 (6–4)	Mackey Arena; West Lafayette, IN
2/6/1999	No. 14	No. 8 Michigan State	L 81–95	15–6 (6–5)	Carver-Hawkeye Arena; Iowa City, IA
2/10/1999	No. 19	No. 22 Minnesota	W 76–73	16–6 (7–5)	Carver-Hawkeye Arena (15,500); Iowa City, IA
2/13/1999	No. 19	at No. 13 Ohio State	L 69–73	16–7 (7–6)	Value City Arena; Columbus, OH
2/21/1999	No. 20	at Illinois	W 78–72	17–7 (8–6)	Assembly Hall; Champaign, IL
2/24/1999	No. 18	at Northwestern	W 65–48	18–7 (9–6)	Carver-Hawkeye Arena; Iowa City, IA
2/27/1999	No. 18	at No. 20 Indiana	L 81–88	18–8 (9–7)	Assembly Hall; Bloomington, IN
Big Ten tournament
3/5/1999*	No. 20	vs. No. 19 Wisconsin; Quarterfinals	L 60–74	18–9	United Center; Chicago, IL
NCAA tournament
3/11/1999*	(5 W) No. 21	vs. (12 W) UAB; First Round	W 77–64	19–9	McNichols Sports Arena; Denver, CO
3/13/1999*	(5 W) No. 21	vs. (4 W) No. 22 Arkansas; Second Round	W 82–72	20–9	McNichols Sports Arena; Denver, CO
3/18/1999*	(5 W) No. 21	vs. (1 W) No. 3 Connecticut; Sweet Sixteen	L 68–78	20–10	America West Arena; Phoenix, AZ
*Non-conference game. ^{#}Rankings from AP Poll. (#) Tournament seedings in parentheses. W=West.

== NBA draft ==
Round	Pick	Player	NBA club
2	46	J. R. Koch	New York Knicks
