= 1998–99 Minnesota Golden Gophers men's basketball team =

American college basketball season

1998–99 Minnesota Golden Gophers men's basketball

NCAA tournament, First Round
- Conference: Big Ten Conference
- Record: 17–11 (8–8 Big Ten)
- Head coach: Clem Haskins (13th season)
- Home arena: Williams Arena

1998–99 Big Ten Conference men's basketball standings
| | Conf. | | | | Overall |
| Team | W | | L | PCT | W | | L | PCT |
|---|---|---|---|---|---|---|---|---|
| No. 2 Michigan State† | 15 | – | 1 | .938 | 33 | – | 5 | .868 |
| No. 19 Indiana | 9 | – | 7 | .563 | 23 | – | 11 | .676 |
| No. 18 Wisconsin | 9 | – | 7 | .563 | 22 | – | 10 | .688 |
| No. 21 Iowa | 9 | – | 7 | .563 | 20 | – | 10 | .667 |
| Purdue | 7 | – | 9 | .438 | 21 | – | 13 | .618 |
| Northwestern | 6 | – | 10 | .375 | 15 | – | 14 | .517 |
| Penn State | 5 | – | 11 | .313 | 13 | – | 14 | .481 |
| Illinois | 3 | – | 13 | .188 | 14 | – | 18 | .438 |
| No. 14 Ohio State** | 1 | – | 1 | .500 | 1 | – | 1 | .500 |
| Minnesota*** | 0 | – | 8 | .000 | 0 | – | 11 | .000 |
| Michigan* | 0 | – | 11 | .000 | 0 | – | 19 | .000 |
† 1999 Big Ten tournament winner Rankings from AP poll *Michigan: 12 games vacated due to sanctions against the program **Ohio State: 34 games including 5 NCAA Tourn. games vacated due to sanctions against the program *** Minnesota vacated 17 games including 1 NCAA Tourn. game due to sanctions against the program Disputed records: Michigan: 12–19, 5–11; Ohio State: 27–9, 12–4; Minnesota: 17–11, 8–8

The 1998–99 Minnesota Golden Gophers men's basketball team represented the University of Minnesota during the 1998–99 NCAA Division I men's basketball season. Led by 13th-year head coach Clem Haskins, the Golden Gophers advanced to the NCAA tournament and finished with a 17–11 record (8–8 Big Ten).

== Roster ==
1998–99 Minnesota Golden Gophers men's basketball team
Players
Coaches

| Pos. | # | Name | Height | Weight | Year | Hometown |
|---|---|---|---|---|---|---|
| F | 20 | Quincy Lewis | 6 ft 7 in (2.01 m) | — | Sr | Little Rock, Arkansas |
| C | 50 | Joel Przybilla | 7 ft 1 in (2.16 m) | 235 lb (107 kg) | Fr |

Head coach

- Clem Haskins (Western Kentucky)

Assistant coach(es)

Legend

- (C) Team captain
- (S) Suspended
- (I) Ineligible
- (W) Walk-on
- Injured
- Current redshirt

== Schedule and results ==
| Date time, TV | Rank^{#} | Opponent^{#} | Result | Record | Site city, state |
Non-conference regular season
| Nov 21, 1998* | | Appalachian State | W 81–67 | 1–0 | Williams Arena; Minneapolis, Minnesota |
| Nov 24, 1998* | | Seton Hall | W 77–70 | 2–0 | Williams Arena; Minneapolis, Minnesota |
| Nov 28, 1998* | | Winthrop | W 68–59 | 3–0 | Williams Arena; Minneapolis, Minnesota |
| Nov 30, 1998* | | Oregon | W 72–61 | 4–0 | Williams Arena; Minneapolis, Minnesota |
| Dec 4, 1998* | | at Fresno State | W 77–65 | 5–0 | Selland Arena; Fresno, California |
| Dec 12, 1998* | No. 24 | Eastern Michigan | W 72–53 | 6–0 | Williams Arena; Minneapolis, Minnesota |
| Dec 16, 1998* | No. 17 | No. 4 Cincinnati | L 61–62 ^{OT} | 6–1 | Williams Arena; Minneapolis, Minnesota |
| Dec 19, 1998* | No. 17 | at Nebraska | W 55–51 | 7–1 | Bob Devaney Sports Center; Lincoln, Nebraska |
| Dec 22, 1998* | No. 17 | Montana State | W 78–64 | 8–1 | Williams Arena; Minneapolis, Minnesota |
| Dec 29, 1998* | No. 16 | Sacramento State | W 98–57 | 9–1 | Williams Arena; Minneapolis, Minnesota |
Big Ten regular season
| Jan 6, 1999 | No. 16 | Northwestern | L 55–58 | 9–2 (0–1) | Williams Arena; Minneapolis, Minnesota |
| Jan 9, 1999 | No. 16 | Penn State | W 75–60 | 10–2 (1–1) | Williams Arena; Minneapolis, Minnesota |
| Jan 13, 1999 | No. 19 | at No. 14 Michigan State | L 55–71 | 10–3 (1–2) | Breslin Student Events Center; East Lansing, Michigan |
| Jan 16, 1999 | No. 19 | No. 12 Iowa | W 75–70 | 11–3 (2–2) | Williams Arena; Minneapolis, Minnesota |
| Jan 20, 1999 | No. 17 | Michigan | W 76–70 | 12–3 (3–2) | Williams Arena; Minneapolis, Minnesota |
| Jan 23, 1999 | No. 19 | at No. 15 Ohio State | L 60–89 | 12–4 (3–3) | Value City Arena; Columbus, Ohio |
| Jan 26, 1999 | No. 19 | No. 20 Indiana | W 90–83 ^{OT} | 13–4 (4–3) | Williams Arena; Minneapolis, Minnesota |
| Jan 30, 1999 | No. 19 | at No. 12 Wisconsin | L 50–61 | 13–5 (4–4) | Kohl Center; Madison, Wisconsin |
| Feb 3, 1999 | No. 18 | Illinois | W 75–63 | 14–5 (5–4) | Williams Arena (14,792); Minneapolis, Minnesota |
| Feb 6, 1999 | No. 18 | at Michigan | L 65–75 | 14–6 (5–5) | Crisler Arena; Ann Arbor, Michigan |
| Feb 10, 1999 | No. 22 | at No. 19 Iowa | L 73–76 | 14–7 (5–6) | Carver-Hawkeye Arena (15,500); Iowa City, Iowa |
| Feb 13, 1999; 6:00 p.m., ESPN | No. 22 | No. 5 Michigan State | L 82–84 | 14–8 (5–7) | Williams Arena (14,887); Minneapolis, Minnesota |
| Feb 17, 1999 | | at Penn State | W 69–63 | 15–8 (6–7) | Bryce Jordan Center; University Park, Pennsylvania |
| Feb 23, 1999 | | at No. 23 Purdue | L 42–54 | 15–9 (6–8) | Mackey Arena; West Lafayette, Indiana |
| Feb 25, 1999 | | No. 23 Purdue | W 62–48 | 16–9 (7–8) | Williams Arena; Minneapolis, Minnesota |
| Feb 27, 1999 | | at Northwestern | W 58–51 | 17–9 (8–8) | Welsh-Ryan Arena; Evanston, Illinois |
Big Ten Tournament
| Mar 4, 1999* | (6) No. 23 | vs. (11) Illinois; Quarterfinals | L 64–67 ^{OT} | 17–10 | United Center; Chicago, Illinois |
NCAA Tournament
| Mar 11, 1999* | (7 W) | vs. (10 W) Gonzaga; First round | L 63–75 | 17–11 | KeyArena; Seattle, Washington |
*Non-conference game. ^{#}Rankings from AP Poll. (#) Tournament seedings in parentheses. All times are in Central Time.
