= 1999 Big Ten men's basketball tournament =

- Classification: Division I
- Season: 1998–99
- Teams: 11
- Site: United Center; Chicago, Illinois
- Champions: Michigan State (1st title)
- Winning coach: Tom Izzo (1st title)
- MVP: Mateen Cleaves (Michigan State)

1998–99 Big Ten Conference men's basketball standings
	Conf.				Overall
Team	W		L	PCT	W		L	PCT
No. 2 Michigan State†	15	–	1	.938	33	–	5	.868
No. 19 Indiana	9	–	7	.563	23	–	11	.676
No. 18 Wisconsin	9	–	7	.563	22	–	10	.688
No. 21 Iowa	9	–	7	.563	20	–	10	.667
Purdue	7	–	9	.438	21	–	13	.618
Northwestern	6	–	10	.375	15	–	14	.517
Penn State	5	–	11	.313	13	–	14	.481
Illinois	3	–	13	.188	14	–	18	.438
No. 14 Ohio State**	1	–	1	.500	1	–	1	.500
Minnesota***	0	–	8	.000	0	–	11	.000
Michigan*	0	–	11	.000	0	–	19	.000
† 1999 Big Ten tournament winner Rankings from AP poll *Michigan: 12 games vacated due to sanctions against the program **Ohio State: 34 games including 5 NCAA Tourn. games vacated due to sanctions against the program *** Minnesota vacated 17 games including 1 NCAA Tourn. game due to sanctions against the program Disputed records: Michigan: 12–19, 5–11; Ohio State: 27–9, 12–4; Minnesota: 17–11, 8–8

The 1999 Big Ten men's basketball tournament was the second annual postseason men's basketball tournament for the Big Ten Conference and was played from March 4 through March 7, 1999, at the United Center in Chicago, Illinois. The championship was won by Michigan State who defeated Illinois in the championship game. As a result, Michigan State received the Big Ten's automatic bid to the NCAA tournament.

Due to Michigan basketball scandal, Michigan has vacated the records from this tournament. Similarly, due to the Minnesota academic scandal, Minnesota's appearance in this tournament was vacated. Ohio State also vacated its appearance in the tournament due to NCAA Sanctions.

== Seeds ==
All Big Ten schools participated in the tournament. Teams were seeded by conference record, with a tiebreaker system used to seed teams with identical conference records. Seeding for the tournament was determined at the close of the regular conference season. The top five teams received a first round bye.

Seed	School	Conference	1st Tiebreaker	2nd Tiebreaker
1	Michigan State	15–1		
2	Ohio State	12–4		
3	Indiana	9–7		
4	Wisconsin	9–7		
5	Iowa	9–7		
6	Minnesota	8–8		
7	Purdue	7–9		
8	Northwestern	6–10		
9	Penn State	5–11		
10	Michigan	5–11		
11	Illinois	3–13		

== Bracket ==
Opening round March 4
8	Northwestern	54
9	Penn State	44
7	Purdue	73
10	Michigan	79
6	#23 Minnesota	64
11	Illinois	67

Quarterfinals; March 5
1	#2 Michigan State	61
8	Northwestern	59
4	#19 Wisconsin	74
5	#20 Iowa	60
2	#11 Ohio State	87
10	Michigan	69
3	#17 Indiana	66
11	Illinois	82

Semifinals; March 6
1	#2 Michigan State	56
4	#19 Wisconsin	41
2	#11 Ohio State	77
11	Illinois	79

Championship; March 7
1	#2 Michigan State	67
11	Illinois	50

== All-Tournament Team ==
- Mateen Cleaves, Michigan State – Big Ten tournament Most Outstanding Player
- Cory Bradford, Illinois
- Antonio Smith, Michigan State
- Evan Eschmeyer, Northwestern
- Michael Redd, Ohio State
