= 1998–99 Ohio State Buckeyes men's basketball team =

American college basketball season

1998–99 Ohio State Buckeyes men's basketball

NCAA tournament, Final Four (Vacated)
- Conference: Big Ten

Ranking
- Coaches: No. 4
- AP: No. 14
- Record: 1–1 (27–9 unadjusted) (0–4 (12–4 unadjusted) Big Ten)
- Head coach: Jim O'Brien (2nd season)
- Home arena: Value City Arena

1998–99 Big Ten Conference men's basketball standings
	Conf.				Overall
Team	W		L	PCT	W		L	PCT
No. 2 Michigan State†	15	–	1	.938	33	–	5	.868
No. 19 Indiana	9	–	7	.563	23	–	11	.676
No. 18 Wisconsin	9	–	7	.563	22	–	10	.688
No. 21 Iowa	9	–	7	.563	20	–	10	.667
Purdue	7	–	9	.438	21	–	13	.618
Northwestern	6	–	10	.375	15	–	14	.517
Penn State	5	–	11	.313	13	–	14	.481
Illinois	3	–	13	.188	14	–	18	.438
No. 14 Ohio State**	1	–	1	.500	1	–	1	.500
Minnesota***	0	–	8	.000	0	–	11	.000
Michigan*	0	–	11	.000	0	–	19	.000
† 1999 Big Ten tournament winner Rankings from AP poll *Michigan: 12 games vacated due to sanctions against the program **Ohio State: 34 games including 5 NCAA Tourn. games vacated due to sanctions against the program *** Minnesota vacated 17 games including 1 NCAA Tourn. game due to sanctions against the program Disputed records: Michigan: 12–19, 5–11; Ohio State: 27–9, 12–4; Minnesota: 17–11, 8–8

The 1998–99 Ohio State Buckeyes men's basketball team represented Ohio State University during the 1998–99 NCAA Division I men's basketball season. It was the Buckeyes’ first season at the new 19,500-seat Value City Arena in Columbus, Ohio, which replaced their previous stadium, St. John Arena.

Led by second-year head coach Jim O'Brien, the Buckeyes finished 27–9 (12–4 Big Ten) and reached the Final Four of the NCAA tournament. However, the NCAA vacated the team's Final Four appearance and adjusted their record to 1–1 due to the Jim O’Brien scandal.

== Roster ==
1998–99 Ohio State Buckeyes men's basketball team
Players
Coaches

Pos.	#	Name	Height	Weight	Year	Hometown
G	3	Neshaun Coleman	6 ft 3 in (1.91 m)	—	Sr
G	9	Devon Smith	6 ft 0 in (1.83 m)	—	Jr
G	12	Scoonie Penn	5 ft 11 in (1.8 m)	180 lb (82 kg)	Jr	Salem, MA
G	13	Brian Brown	6 ft 4 in (1.93 m)	200 lb (91 kg)	Fr
G	21	Boban Savović	6 ft 5 in (1.96 m)	240 lb (109 kg)	Fr	Šibenik, Croatia
C	22	Shamar Herron	6 ft 9 in (2.06 m)	250 lb (113 kg)	So
F	23	Jason Singleton	6 ft 5 in (1.96 m)	—	Sr
C	32	Ken Johnson	6 ft 11 in (2.11 m)	240 lb (109 kg)	So	Detroit, MI
F	31	Kwadjo Steele	6 ft 6 in (1.98 m)	—	Jr
F	33	Jon Sanderson	6 ft 7 in (2.01 m)	230 lb (104 kg)	So
G	35	Michael Redd	6 ft 6 in (1.98 m)	200 lb (91 kg)	So	Columbus, OH
F	40	George Reese	6 ft 7 in (2.01 m)	233 lb (106 kg)	Jr	Columbus, OH
C	43	Will Dudley	6 ft 9 in (2.06 m)	230 lb (104 kg)	Fr

Head coach

- Jim O'Brien (Boston College)

Assistant coach(es)

Legend

- (C) Team captain
- (S) Suspended
- (I) Ineligible
- (W) Walk-on
- Injured
- Current redshirt

== Schedule and results ==
Date time, TV	Rank^{#}	Opponent^{#}	Result	Record	Site city, state
Regular season
Dec 21, 1998*		vs. UAB	W 71–64	9–2	Eugene Guerra Sports Complex; San Juan, Puerto Rico
Dec 22, 1998*		vs. NC State	W 81–64	10–2	Eugene Guerra Sports Complex; San Juan, Puerto Rico
Dec 23, 1998*		vs. Ole Miss	W 67–62	11–2	Eugene Guerra Sports Complex; San Juan, Puerto Rico
Dec 27, 1998*		vs. Miami (FL); Orange Bowl Basketball Classic	L 64-72	11–3	
Big Ten Tournament
Mar 5, 1999*	No. 11	vs. Michigan; Big Ten Tournament Quarterfinal	W 87–69	23–7	United Center; Chicago, IL
Mar 6, 1999*	No. 11	vs. Illinois; Big Ten Tournament Semifinal	L 77–79	23–8	United Center; Chicago, IL
NCAA Tournament
Mar 11, 1999*	(4 S) No. 14	vs. (13 S) Murray State; First round	W 72–58	24–8	RCA Dome; Indianapolis, IN
Mar 13, 1999*	(4 S) No. 14	vs. (12 S) Detroit; Second Round	W 75–44	25–8	RCA Dome; Indianapolis, IN
Mar 18, 1999*	(4 S) No. 14	vs. (1 S) No. 4 Auburn; South Regional semifinal	W 72–64	26–8	Thompson-Boling Arena; Knoxville, TN
Mar 20, 1999*	(4 S) No. 14	vs. (3 S) No. 9 St. John's; South Regional Final	W 77–74	27–8	Thompson-Boling Arena; Knoxville, TN
Mar 27, 1999*	(4 S) No. 14	vs. (1 W) No. 3 Connecticut; National semifinal	L 58–64	27–9	Tropicana Field (41,340); St. Petersburg, FL
*Non-conference game. ^{#}Rankings from AP. (#) Tournament seedings in parentheses. S=South. All times are in Eastern.
