= 1998–99 Purdue Boilermakers men's basketball team =

American college basketball season

1998–99 Purdue Boilermakers men's basketball

NCAA tournament, Sweet Sixteen
- Conference: Big Ten Conference

Ranking
- Coaches: No. 22
- Record: 21–13 (7–9 Big Ten)
- Head coach: Gene Keady
- Assistant coaches: Todd Foster; Jay Price; Jim Thrash
- Home arena: Mackey Arena

1998–99 Big Ten Conference men's basketball standings
	Conf.				Overall
Team	W		L	PCT	W		L	PCT
No. 2 Michigan State†	15	–	1	.938	33	–	5	.868
No. 19 Indiana	9	–	7	.563	23	–	11	.676
No. 18 Wisconsin	9	–	7	.563	22	–	10	.688
No. 21 Iowa	9	–	7	.563	20	–	10	.667
Purdue	7	–	9	.438	21	–	13	.618
Northwestern	6	–	10	.375	15	–	14	.517
Penn State	5	–	11	.313	13	–	14	.481
Illinois	3	–	13	.188	14	–	18	.438
No. 14 Ohio State**	1	–	1	.500	1	–	1	.500
Minnesota***	0	–	8	.000	0	–	11	.000
Michigan*	0	–	11	.000	0	–	19	.000
† 1999 Big Ten tournament winner Rankings from AP poll *Michigan: 12 games vacated due to sanctions against the program **Ohio State: 34 games including 5 NCAA Tourn. games vacated due to sanctions against the program *** Minnesota vacated 17 games including 1 NCAA Tourn. game due to sanctions against the program Disputed records: Michigan: 12–19, 5–11; Ohio State: 27–9, 12–4; Minnesota: 17–11, 8–8

The 1998–99 Purdue Boilermakers men's basketball team represented Purdue University as a member of the Big Ten Conference during the 1998–99 NCAA Division I men's basketball season. The team was led by Gene Keady and played its home games at Mackey Arena.

== Roster ==
1998–99 Purdue Boilermakers men's basketball team
Players
Coaches

Pos.	#	Name	Height	Weight	Year	Previous school	Hometown
F	5	Gary McQuay	6 ft 8 in (2.03 m)	—	Jr		Gary, Indiana
G	11	Chad Kerkhof	6 ft 1 in (1.85 m)	—	Jr		Greenfield, Indiana
G	12	Maynard Lewis	6 ft 1 in (1.85 m)	—	Fr		Terre Haute, Indiana
G	15	Alan Eldridge	6 ft 1 in (1.85 m)	195 lb (88 kg)	Sr		Fort Wayne, Indiana
G	20	Tony Mayfield	6 ft 1 in (1.85 m)	—	Sr		Milwaukee, Wisconsin
F	21	Cam Stephens	6 ft 8 in (2.03 m)	—	So		Fort Wayne, Indiana
G	22	Jaraan Cornell	6 ft 3 in (1.91 m)	200 lb (91 kg)	Jr	Clay	South Bend, Indiana
F	23	Mike Robinson	6 ft 6 in (1.98 m)	—	Jr	Richwoods	Peoria, Illinois
G	31	Rodney Smith	6 ft 6 in (1.98 m)	—	Fr		Indianapolis, Indiana
C	32	Greg McQuay	6 ft 7 in (2.01 m)	—	Jr		Gary, Indiana
F	35	Brian Cardinal	6 ft 8 in (2.03 m)	240 lb (109 kg)	Jr	Unity	Tolono, Illinois
F	40	Jamaal Davis	6 ft 9 in (2.06 m)	—	So		Merrillville, Indiana
G	43	Carson Cunningham	6 ft 1 in (1.85 m)	—	So	Andrean	Ogden Dunes, Indiana
C	54	John Allison	6 ft 10 in (2.08 m)	—	Fr		New Palestine, Indiana

Head coach

- Gene Keady (Kansas State)

Assistant coach(es)

- Todd Foster (Purdue)
- Jay Price (Kansas)
- Jim Thrash (Eastern New Mexico)

Legend

- (C) Team captain
- (S) Suspended
- (I) Ineligible
- (W) Walk-on
- Injured
- Current redshirt

== Schedule and results ==
Date time, TV	Rank^{#}	Opponent^{#}	Result	Record	Site city, state
Regular season
Nov 13, 1998*	No. 16	UNC Asheville	W 101–64	1–0	Mackey Arena; West Lafayette, Indiana
Nov 16, 1998*	No. 15	Illinois-Chicago	W 77–61	2–0	Mackey Arena; West Lafayette, Indiana
Nov 18, 1998*	No. 15	Gonzaga	W 83–68	3–0	Mackey Arena; West Lafayette, Indiana
Nov 22, 1998*	No. 15	Lafayette	W 72–67	4–0	Mackey Arena; West Lafayette, Indiana
Nov 25, 1998*	No. 14	vs. No. 9 North Carolina	L 47–54	4–1	Madison Square Garden; New York, New York
Nov 27, 1998*	No. 14	at No. 23 St. John's	W 70–69	5–1	Madison Square Garden; New York, New York
Nov 29, 1998*	No. 14	Eastern Illinois	W 62–49	6–1	Mackey Arena; West Lafayette, Indiana
Dec 5, 1998*	No. 14	at No. 23 Xavier	W 71–57	7–1	Cincinnati Gardens; Cincinnati, Ohio
Dec 8, 1998*	No. 9	Illinois State	W 69–55	8–1	Mackey Arena; West Lafayette, Indiana
Dec 11, 1998*	No. 9	Valparaiso	W 78–70	9–1	Mackey Arena; West Lafayette, Indiana
Dec 12, 1998*	No. 9	La Salle	W 80–59	10–1	Mackey Arena; West Lafayette, Indiana
Dec 19, 1998*	No. 8	at Butler	W 63–54	11–1	Hinkle Fieldhouse; Indianapolis, Indiana
Dec 22, 1998*	No. 9	vs. South Carolina	W 80–64	12–1	Continental Airlines Arena; East Rutherford, New Jersey
Dec 27, 1998*	No. 9	at Providence	L 82–87	12–2	Providence Civic Center; Providence, Rhode Island
Jan 6, 1999	No. 9	at Penn State	W 70-67	13–2 (1-0)	Bryce Jordan Center; Happy Valley, Pennsylvania
Jan 10, 1999	No. 9	at No. 24 Wisconsin	L 56-61	13–3 (1-1)	Kohl Center; Madison, Wisconsin
Jan 13, 1999	No. 13	Illinois	W 63-54	14–3 (2-1)	Mackey Arena; West Lafayette, Indiana
Jan 16, 1999	No. 13	No. 23 Indiana	L 76-87	14–4 (2-2)	Mackey Arena; West Lafayette, Indiana
Jan 19, 1999	No. 16	at Ohio State	L 43-72	14–5 (2-3)	Value City Arena; Columbus, Ohio
Jan 23, 1999	No. 16	Michigan	W 81-71	15–5 (3-3)	Mackey Arena; West Lafayette, Indiana
Jan 27, 1999	No. 14	at Northwestern	L 50-54	15–6 (3-4)	Welsh-Ryan Arena; Evanston, Illinois
Feb 27, 1999		No. 3 Michigan State	L 46–60	19–11 (7–9)	Mackey Arena; West Lafayette, Indiana
Big Ten Tournament
Mar 4, 1999*		vs. Michigan; First round	L 73–79 ^{OT}	19–12	United Center; Chicago, Illinois
NCAA Tournament
Mar 12, 1999*	(10 E)	vs. (7 E) Texas; First round	W 58–54	20–12	TD Garden; Boston, Massachusetts
Mar 14, 1999*	(10 E)	vs. (2 E) No. 10 Miami (FL); Second Round	W 73–63	21–12	TD Garden; Boston, Massachusetts
Mar 19, 1999*	(10 E)	vs. (6 E) Temple; East Regional semifinal – Sweet Sixteen	L 55–77	21–13	Continental Airlines Arena; East Rutherford, New Jersey
*Non-conference game. ^{#}Rankings from AP Poll. (#) Tournament seedings in parentheses. E=East.
