= Mateen Cleaves =

American basketball player (born 1977)

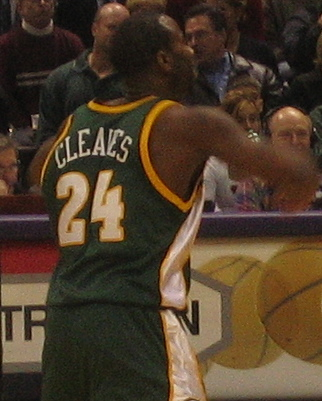
- Cleaves with the Seattle SuperSonics in 2006

Phoenix Suns
- Title: Assistant coach
- League: NBA

Personal information
- Born: September 7, 1977 (age 49) Flint, Michigan, U.S.
- Listed height: 6 ft 2 in (1.88 m)
- Listed weight: 210 lb (95 kg)

Career information
- High school: Flint Northern (Flint, Michigan)
- College: Michigan State (1996–2000)
- NBA draft: 2000: 1st round, 14th overall pick
- Drafted by: Detroit Pistons
- Playing career: 2000–2009
- Position: Point guard
- Number: 24, 8

Career history

Playing
- 2000–2001: Detroit Pistons
- 2001–2003: Sacramento Kings
- 2003–2004: Huntsville Flight
- 2004: Cleveland Cavaliers
- 2004: Huntsville Flight
- 2004–2006: Seattle SuperSonics
- 2006: Fayetteville Patriots
- 2006–2007: UNICS Kazan
- 2007: Bakersfield Jam
- 2007–2008: Panionios
- 2008–2009: Bakersfield Jam

Career highlights
- NCAA champion (2000); NCAA Final Four Most Outstanding Player (2000); Consensus first-team All-American (1999); 2× Consensus second-team All-American (1998, 2000); 2× Big Ten Player of the Year (1998, 1999); Big Ten tournament MOP (1999); No. 12 retired by Michigan State Spartans; McDonald's All-American (1996); First-team Parade All-American (1996)
- Stats at NBA.com
- Stats at Basketball Reference
Medals
Representing United States
Men's basketball
FIBA World Championship
Bronze medal – third place	1998 Athens	National team

Mateen Ahmad Cleaves (born September 7, 1977) is an American former professional basketball player who currently serves as an assistant coach for the Phoenix Suns of the National Basketball Association (NBA). He played parts of six seasons in the NBA. He was an All-American college player for Michigan State, where he led the Spartans to a national championship in 2000. He has also worked as a studio analyst for Fox Sports.

== College career ==
Cleaves was a heavily recruited high school athlete. The Michigan Wolverines men's basketball program took Cleaves on a recruiting trip 40 miles from Ann Arbor's campus which ignited the start of the major scandal. Cleaves and current players were passengers in a rollover accident leaving a party in Detroit with strippers, alcohol, and drugs that also included a stop at the home of Eddie L. "Ed" Martin.

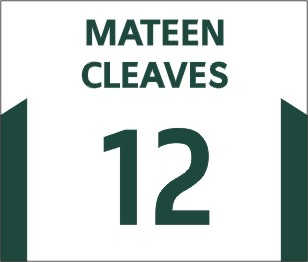
Cleaves' #12 was retired by Michigan State University in 2007

Martin's involvement in the party while being a Michigan booster and the distance from campus triggered an NCAA investigation leading to major sanctions against the Wolverines' basketball program. Cleaves eventually agreed to attend Michigan State University, the University of Michigan's in-state rival. He is one of the four MSU players from Flint, Michigan, dubbed "The Flintstones".

Cleaves, a three-time Michigan State captain, led the Spartans to the 2000 national championship, and was named Most Outstanding Player of the Final Four.

The school's only three-time All-American, Cleaves was named Big Ten Player of the Year twice. He led MSU and the conference in career assists with 816, and is Michigan State's all-time steals leader (193). In his final home game on senior night in East Lansing, Cleaves dished out 20 assists, breaking the Big Ten single-game and career assist marks.

On February 3, 2007, Cleaves became the eighth MSU player to have his number retired.

== Professional career ==
In 2000, Cleaves was selected 14th overall in the 2000 NBA draft by the Detroit Pistons. During the 2000–01 season, he played in 78 games, averaging 5.4 points and 2.7 assists.

Cleaves was traded to the Sacramento Kings shortly before the 2001–02 season for Jon Barry and a first-round draft pick. After two seasons playing sparingly, he signed as a free agent with the Boston Celtics, but was waived before the 2003–04 season. He played with the Cleveland Cavaliers in four games. He was then signed by the Seattle SuperSonics, was cut during the 2004–05 season, and re-signed during the following season.

In total, Cleaves played 167 NBA games, starting in 10 of them and had career averages of 3.6 points, 2 assists and 1 rebound a game. His final NBA game was played on February 14, 2006, in a 91 - 106 loss to the Milwaukee Bucks. In that game Cleaves recorded 2 points and 3 assists.

Following his NBA stint, Cleaves appeared for the Fayetteville Patriots and the Bakersfield Jam of the D-League, also playing abroad with Russia's Unics Kazan and Greece's Panionios BC. In 2008, he played with the Denver Nuggets in their pre-season, but was waived before the October 29 tip-off.

== NBA career statistics ==
Legend
GP	Games played	GS	Games started	MPG	Minutes per game
FG%	Field goal percentage	3P%	3-point field goal percentage	FT%	Free throw percentage
RPG	Rebounds per game	APG	Assists per game	SPG	Steals per game
BPG	Blocks per game	PPG	Points per game	**Bold**	Career high

=== Regular season ===
Year	Team	GP	GS	MPG	FG%	3P%	FT%	RPG	APG	SPG	BPG	PPG
2000–01	Detroit	**78**	**8**	16.3	.400	.294	.708	1.7	2.7	.6	.0	**5.4**
2001–02	Sacramento	32	0	4.8	**.441**	.250	**.889**	.3	.8	.2	.0	2.2
2002–03	Sacramento	12	0	4.6	.261	**1.000**	.750	.7	.8	.2	.0	1.3
2003–04	Cleveland	4	2	**23.0**	.304	.000	.500	**1.8**	**4.8**	**1.0**	**.5**	3.8
2004–05	Seattle	14	0	4.6	.357	.000	.750	.4	.5	.1	.0	.9
2005–06	Seattle	27	0	8.5	.352	.250	.792	.5	1.6	.1	.1	2.7
Career		167	10	11.2	.389	.267	.728	1.0	1.9	.4	.0	3.6

== Post-playing career ==
On March 14, 2010, it was announced that Cleaves had joined Fox Sports Detroit as a Detroit Pistons studio analyst. In addition Cleaves has branched out into music as an owner of the record label All Varsity Entertainment, featuring Jon Connor.

Cleaves joined United Wholesale Mortgage and former teammate Mat Ishbia in 2019 as a leadership development coach. In 2021 he was promoted to leader of the leadership development team and is famous in the company for his "Mateen's Motivational Tuesday" posts.

On July 10, 2025, the Phoenix Suns hired Cleaves as part of their coaching staff under head coach Jordan Ott.

== Criminal cases ==
In 1998, while at Michigan State, Cleaves ran afoul of the law twice, both cases involving alcohol. One night, Cleaves took a beer from a 7-Eleven while the clerk was in the bathroom, leaving money on the counter. Cleaves was underage at the time and the incident occurred after legal alcohol selling hours. He was benched for half a game, fined, and ordered to perform community service. Later that year, Cleaves and fellow player Andre Hutson were arrested after being caught driving a car while drinking. Hutson, the driver, had a 0.02 BAC, under legal intoxication levels, but Hutson was underage and charged under Michigan's "zero tolerance" policy regarding alcohol and minors. Cleaves was charged with being a minor in possession of alcohol, refusing a breath test, and not wearing his seat belt.

In October 2015, Cleaves was investigated for his role in an alleged sexual assault. Cleaves was accused of taking a 24-year-old woman to a motel in Mundy Township, on September 15, 2015, keeping her against her will and sexually assaulting her. He was released on a $150,000 personal bond. The case was handled by Wayne County because Genesee County Prosecutor David Leyton had a conflict of interest.

On December 5, 2016, after reviewing surveillance video and the alleged victim's testimony, all charges against Cleaves were dismissed by District Court Judge M. Cathy Dowd. Prosecutors promptly appealed. On April 10, 2017, Genesee Circuit Court Judge Archie L. Hayman ruled that District Court Judge M. Cathy Dowd abused her discretion in finding no probable cause that Cleaves committed a crime, remanding the case to district court and ordering it bound over for a jury trial. On May 16, 2017, Cleaves' attorneys appealed the decision to the Michigan Court of Appeals, arguing that Judge Hayman "ignored the evidence of the case." On August 1, 2017, it was announced three Michigan Court of Appeals judges denied Cleaves' request to review a judge's decision to reinstate sexual assault charges against him. On January 4, 2018, it was announced that the Michigan Supreme Court declined to review a judge's decision to reinstate sexual assault charges against Cleaves. In August 2019, the case returned to county court for trial, and on August 20, 2019, Cleaves was acquitted of all charges. A video published on the Internet shows the woman attempting to resist him as he pulls her back to the hotel room. Cleaves attorney Frank J. Manley released a statement saying that Cleaves was doing the right thing by pulling a naked woman back into the hotel room and allowed her to leave when fully dressed. Manley also stated that Cleaves' case was dismissed previously by a female judge who heard all the evidence and he was acquitted by a jury which included nine female jurors out of 12.

== See also ==
- List of NCAA Division I men's basketball players with 20 or more assists in a game
