= 1998–99 NCAA Division I men's basketball rankings =

- Season: 1998–99
- NCAA Tournament: 1999
- Preseason No. 1: Duke
- NCAA Tournament Champions: Connecticut
NCAA Division I men's basketball rankings


The 1998–99 NCAA Division I men's basketball rankings was made up of two human polls, the AP Poll and the Coaches Poll, in addition to various other preseason polls.

== Legend ==
	Increase in ranking
	Decrease in ranking
	New to rankings from previous week
Italics	Number of first place votes
(#–#)	Win–loss record
т	Tied with team above or below also with this symbol

== AP Poll ==
	Preseason	Week 1 Nov. 17	Week 2 Nov. 24	Week 3 Dec. 1	Week 4 Dec. 8	Week 5 Dec. 15	Week 6 Dec. 22	Week 7 Dec. 29	Week 8 Jan. 5	Week 9 Jan. 12	Week 10 Jan. 19	Week 11 Jan. 26	Week 12 Feb. 2	Week 13 Feb. 9	Week 14 Feb. 16	Week 15 Feb. 23	Week 16 Mar. 2	Final Mar. 9	
1.	Duke	Duke (1–0)	Duke (3–0)	Connecticut (4–0)	Connecticut (6–0)	Connecticut (8–0)	Connecticut (8–0)	Connecticut (9–0)	Connecticut (11–0) (55)	Connecticut (13–0)	Connecticut (15–0)	Connecticut (17–0)	Connecticut (19–0)	Duke (23–1)	Duke (25–1)	Duke (27–1)	Duke (29–1)	Duke (32–1)	1.
2.	Connecticut	Connecticut (1–0)	Connecticut (2–0)	Maryland (7–0)	Maryland (9–0)	Duke (9–1)	Duke (10–1)	Duke (11–1)	Duke (13–1) (13)	Duke (15–1)	Duke (17–1)	Duke (19–1)	Duke (21–1)	Connecticut (20–1)	Connecticut (22–1)	Auburn (25–1)	Michigan State (26–4)	Michigan State (29–4)	2.
3.	Stanford	Stanford (1–0)	Stanford (3–0)	North Carolina (6–0)	Duke (7–1)	Kentucky (9–1)	Kentucky (10–1)	Cincinnati (11–0)	Cincinnati (12–0) (3)	Cincinnati (15–0)	Stanford (15–2)	Stanford (17–2)	Cincinnati (20–1)	Auburn (22–1)	Auburn (24–1)	Michigan State (25–4)	Connecticut (25–2)	Connecticut (28–2)	3.
4.	Kentucky	Kentucky (0–0)	Kentucky (2–0)	Duke (5–1)	Cincinnati (5–0)	Cincinnati (6–0)	Cincinnati (9–0)	Maryland (13–1)	Stanford (11–2)	Stanford (13–2)	Maryland (16–2)	Maryland (18–2)	Stanford (18–3)	Cincinnati (21–2)	Michigan State (22–4)	Connecticut (23–2)	Auburn (26–2)	Auburn (27–3)	4.
5.	Michigan State	Michigan State (1–0)	Maryland (3–0)	Stanford (4–1)	Kentucky (7–1)	Maryland (10–1)	Maryland (11–1)	Stanford (9–2)	Maryland (13–2)	Maryland (15–2)	Cincinnati (16–1)	Cincinnati (18–1)	Kentucky (19–4)	Michigan State (20–4)	Maryland (22–4)	Maryland (23–4)	Maryland (25–4)	Maryland (26–5)	5.
6.	Maryland	Maryland (1–0)	Temple (4–0)	Cincinnati (4–0)	Stanford (4–2)	Stanford (5–2)	Stanford (7–2)	Arizona (6–0)	Kentucky (12–3)	Kentucky (14–3)	Auburn (17–0)	Kentucky (17–4)	Auburn (20–1)	Stanford (19–4)	Kentucky (20–6)	Stanford (22–5)	Stanford (24–5)	Utah (27–4)	6.
7.	Temple	Temple (2–0)	Michigan State (2–1)	Kansas (4–0)	North Carolina (8–1)	North Carolina (10–1)	North Carolina (12–1)	Kentucky (10–3)	UCLA (9–2)	Arizona (11–1)	Kentucky (15–4)	Auburn (18–1)	Maryland (19–3)	Maryland (20–4)	Stanford (20–5)	Arizona (20–4)	Cincinnati (25–4)	Stanford (25–6)	7.
8.	Kansas	Kansas (1–0)	Kansas (3–0)	Kentucky (5–1)	Arizona (4–0)	Arizona (5–0)	Arizona (6–0)	Indiana (12–2)	Arizona (8–1)	Auburn (15–0)	St. John's (15–3)	Michigan State (16–4)	Michigan State (18–4)	Kentucky (20–4)	Arizona (18–4)	St. John's (22–6)	Utah (24–4)	Kentucky (25–8)	8.
9.	Tennessee	Utah (1–0)	North Carolina (3–0)	Michigan State (4–1)	Purdue (7–1)	Purdue (10–1)	Purdue (11–1)	North Carolina (12–2)	Purdue (12–2)	North Carolina (14–3)	Arizona (12–2)	St. John's (16–4)	St. John's (17–5)	UCLA (17–5)	Cincinnati (21–4)	Cincinnati (23–4)	Miami (FL) (21–5)	St. John's (25–8)	9.
10.	Utah	North Carolina (1–0)	UCLA (1–0)	Temple (4–1)	Kansas (5–1)	Indiana (10–2)	Indiana (11–2)	UCLA (7–2)	St. John's (11–2)	UCLA (11–3)	North Carolina (15–4)	North Carolina (17–4)	Arizona (15–3)	Arizona (16–4)	St. John's (20–6)	Ohio State (21–6)	St. John's (23–7)	Miami (FL) (22–6)	10.
11.	North Carolina	UCLA (0–0)	Arizona (1–0)	Oklahoma State (4–0)	Indiana (8–1)	New Mexico (6–0)	New Mexico (7–0)	Purdue (12–2)	North Carolina (13–3)	St. John's (13–3)	Michigan State (14–4)	UCLA (14–4)	Wisconsin (19–3)	St. John's (18–6)	Ohio State (19–6)	Miami (FL) (19–5)	Ohio State (22–7)	Cincinnati (26–5)	11.
12.	UCLA	Arizona (1–0)	Oklahoma State (3–0)	Syracuse (5–0)	New Mexico (5–0)	UCLA (5–2)	UCLA (6–2)	St. John's (10–2)	Michigan State (11–3)	Iowa (12–1)	New Mexico (16–2)	Wisconsin (18–3)	North Carolina (18–5)	North Carolina (19–6)	Utah (20–4)	Utah (22–4)	UCLA (21–7)	Arizona (22–6)	12.
13.	Oklahoma State	Oklahoma State (0–0)	Xavier (2–0)	Arizona (3–0)	Syracuse (7–1)	Kansas (6–2)	Kansas (8–2)	Michigan State (9–3)	Indiana (14–3)	Purdue (13–3)	UCLA (12–4)	Arizona (13–3)	UCLA (15–5)	Ohio State (17–6)	Wisconsin (21–5)	Kentucky (21–7)	Arizona (20–6)	North Carolina (24–9)	13.
14.	Washington	Washington (0–0)	Purdue (4–0)	Purdue (6–1)	Michigan State (4–3)	Michigan State (6–3)	St. John's (9–2)	Clemson (10–1)	Auburn (13–0)	Michigan State (12–4)	Iowa (13–2)	Purdue (15–5)	Iowa (15–4)	Utah (18–4)	North Carolina (19–7)	North Carolina (21–7)	Kentucky (22–8)	Ohio State (23–8)	14.
15.	Cincinnati	Purdue (1–0)	Cincinnati (1–0)	Washington (4–0)	UCLA (4–2)	St. John's (8–2)	Michigan State (6–3)	New Mexico (8–1)	New Mexico (12–1)	Kansas (11–3)	Wisconsin (16–3)	Ohio State (15–5)	Ohio State (16–6)	Wisconsin (19–5)	Miami (FL) (17–5)	UCLA (19–7)	North Carolina (22–8)	UCLA (22–8)	15.
16.	Purdue	Xavier (0–0)	Washington (1–0)	Indiana (6–1)	Temple (4–3)	Clemson (8–1)	Clemson (9–1)	Minnesota (8–1)	Minnesota (9–1)	New Mexico (14–2)	Purdue (14–4)	Iowa (13–4)	Syracuse (15–6)	Miami (FL) (15–5)	UCLA (17–7)	Wisconsin (21–6)	College of Charleston (28–2)	College of Charleston (28–2)	16.
17.	Xavier	Cincinnati (0–0)	Indiana (4–0)	New Mexico (4–0)	Clemson (7–1)	Minnesota (6–0)	Minnesota (7–1)	Auburn (11–0)	Iowa (11–1)	Wisconsin (14–3)	Minnesota (11–3)	Syracuse (14–5)	New Mexico (17–4)	Indiana (18–7)	Purdue (18–7)	College of Charleston (25–2)	Indiana (22–9)	Arkansas (22–10)	17.
18.	Arizona	Tennessee (1–1)	Utah (1–1)	UCLA (2–2)	St. John's (6–2)	Oklahoma State (5–2)	Auburn (11–0)	Kansas (8–3)	Kansas (9–3)	Syracuse (11–3)	Indiana (16–5)	New Mexico (16–4)	Minnesota (13–5)	Syracuse (16–7)	College of Charleston (23–2)	Iowa (17–7)	Tennessee (20–7)	Wisconsin (22–9)	18.
19.	Arkansas	Arkansas (1–0)	Syracuse (2–0)	Arkansas (5–1)	Oklahoma State (4–2)	Auburn (9–0)	Arkansas (8–2)	Wisconsin (12–1)	Arkansas (11–2)	Minnesota (10–2)	Kansas (12–4)	Minnesota (12–4)	Purdue (15–6)	Iowa (15–6)	Indiana (19–8)	Florida (18–6)	Wisconsin (21–8)	Indiana (22–10)	19.
20.	New Mexico т	New Mexico (1–0)	New Mexico (2–0)	Pittsburgh (6–1)	Pittsburgh (7–2)	Arkansas (6–2)	Wisconsin (10–1)	Arkansas (9–2)	Syracuse (10–3)	TCU (12–2)	Syracuse (12–4)	Indiana (16–6)	Utah (16–4)	College of Charleston (21–2)	Iowa (16–7)	Indiana (20–9)	Iowa (18–8)	Tennessee (20–8)	20.
21.	Syracuse т	Indiana (3–0)	Arkansas (4–1)	Utah (3–2)	Tennessee (6–2)	Syracuse (7–3)	Iowa (8–1)	Iowa (9–1)	Clemson (11–3)	Ohio State (13–3)	TCU (14–3)	Arkansas (14–5)	Indiana (17–7)	Purdue (16–7)	Syracuse (17–8)	New Mexico (21–6)	Florida (19–7)	Iowa (18–9)	21.
22.	Indiana	Syracuse (0–0)	Clemson (3–0)	Miami (OH) (4–0)	Washington (4–2)	Pittsburgh (7–4)	Syracuse (7–3)	Syracuse (8–3)	TCU (12–2)	Oklahoma State (11–3)	Arkansas (13–4)	Kansas (13–5)	College of Charleston (18–2)	Minnesota (14–6)	Missouri (18–5)	Texas (17–10)	Arkansas (20–9)	Kansas (22–9)	22.
23.	Rhode Island	Massachusetts (0–0)	St. John's (2–0)	Xavier (4–2)	Arkansas (5–2)	Wisconsin (9–1)	Oklahoma (6–1)	Pittsburgh (8–4)	Oklahoma State (9–3)	Indiana (14–5)	Oklahoma State (12–4)	Miami (FL) (12–4)	Arkansas (15–6)	Florida (16–5)	Florida (17–6)	Purdue (18–9)	Minnesota (17–9)	Florida (20–8)	23.
24.	UMass	Clemson (1–0)	Miami (OH) (3–0)	Clemson (5–1)	Minnesota (5–0)	Oklahoma (5–1)	Pittsburgh (7–4)	TCU (10–2)	Wisconsin (12–3)	Arkansas (11–4)	Louisville (10–3)	TCU (15–4)	Missouri (15–4)	Kansas (18–6)	New Mexico (20–6)	Syracuse (18–9)	Missouri (20–7)	Charlotte (22–10)	24.
25.	TCU	Rhode Island (2–1)	Tennessee (2–2)	St. John's (3–2)	Utah (4–3)	Iowa (7–1)	Oklahoma State (6–3)	Oklahoma State (7–3)	California (9–2)	Clemson (12–4)	Miami (FL) (11–3)	Florida (14–3)	Miami (FL) (13–5)	New Mexico (17–6)	Miami (OH) (19–4)	Temple (18–9)	New Mexico (22–7)	New Mexico (24–8)	25.
	Preseason	Week 1 Nov. 17	Week 2 Nov. 24	Week 3 Dec. 1	Week 4 Dec. 8	Week 5 Dec. 15	Week 6 Dec. 22	Week 7 Dec. 29	Week 8 Jan. 5	Week 9 Jan. 12	Week 10 Jan. 19	Week 11 Jan. 26	Week 12 Feb. 2	Week 13 Feb. 9	Week 14 Feb. 16	Week 15 Feb. 23	Week 16 Mar. 2	Final Mar. 9	
		Dropped: TCU (2–1)	Dropped: Clemson (2–1); Rhode Island (3–2)	Dropped: Tennessee (3–3)	Dropped: Miami (OH) (5–1); Xavier (5–3)	Dropped: Temple (5–4); Tennessee (7–3); Washington (5–3); Utah (5–4)	None	Dropped: Oklahoma (6–3)	Dropped: Pittsburgh (9–5)	Dropped: California (10–3)	Dropped: Ohio State (13–5); Clemson (13–5)	Dropped: Oklahoma State (13–5)	Dropped: Kansas (14–6); TCU (16–5); Florida (14–5)	Dropped: Arkansas (15–8); Missouri (16–5)	Dropped: Minnesota (14–8); Kansas (18–8)	Dropped: Missouri (18–7); Miami (OH) (20–5)	Dropped: Purdue (18–10); Texas (18–11); Syracuse (19–10); Temple (18–10)	Dropped: Minnesota (17–10); Missouri (20–8)	

== Coaches Poll ==
	Preseason	Week 2 Nov. 25	Week 3 Dec. 2	Week 4 Dec. 9	Week 5 Dec. 16	Week 6 Dec. 23	Week 7 Dec. 30	Week 8 Jan. 6	Week 9 Jan. 13	Week 10 Jan. 20	Week 11 Jan. 27	Week 12 Feb. 3	Week 13 Feb. 10	Week 14 Feb. 17	Week 15 Feb. 24	Week 16 Mar. 3	Week 17 Mar. 10	Final Apr. 4	
1.	Duke	Duke (3–0)	Connecticut (4–0)	Connecticut (6–0)	Connecticut (8–0)	Connecticut (8–0)	Connecticut (9–0)	Connecticut (11–0)	Connecticut (13–0)	Connecticut (15–0)	Connecticut (17–0)	Connecticut (19–0)	Duke (23–1)	Duke (25–1)	Duke (27–1)	Duke (29–1)	Duke (32–1)	Connecticut (34–2)	1.
2.	Stanford	Stanford (3–0)	Maryland (7–0)	Maryland (9–0)	Duke (9–1)	Duke (10–1)	Duke (11–1)	Duke (13–1)	Duke (15–1)	Duke (17–1)	Duke (19–1)	Duke (21–1)	Connecticut (20–1)	Connecticut (22–1)	Auburn (25–1)	Michigan State (26–4)	Michigan State (29–4)	Duke (37–2)	2.
3.	Connecticut	Connecticut (2–0)	North Carolina (6–0)	Duke (7–1)	Cincinnati (6–0)	Cincinnati (9–0)	Cincinnati (11–0)	Cincinnati (12–0)	Cincinnati (15–0)	Stanford (15–2)	Stanford (17–2)	Cincinnati (20–1)	Auburn (22–1)	Auburn (24–1)	Michigan State (25–4)	Connecticut (25–2)	Connecticut (28–2)	Michigan State (33–5)	3.
4.	Michigan State	Kentucky (2–0)	Duke (5–1)	Cincinnati (5–0)	Kentucky (9–1)	Kentucky (10–1)	Maryland (13–1)	Stanford (11–2)	Stanford (13–2)	Maryland (16–2)	Maryland (18–2)	Stanford (18–3)	Michigan State (20–4)	Michigan State (22–4)	Connecticut (23–2)	Auburn (26–2)	Auburn (27–3)	Ohio State (27–9)	4.
5.	Maryland	Maryland (3–0)	Stanford (4–1)	Kentucky (7–1)	Maryland (10–1)	Maryland (11–1)	Stanford (9–2)	Kentucky (12–3)	Maryland (15–2)	Cincinnati (16–1)	Cincinnati (18–1)	Kentucky (19–4)	Cincinnati (21–2)	Maryland (22–4)	Maryland (23–4)	Maryland (25–4)	Maryland (26–5)	Kentucky (28–9) т	5.
6.	Kentucky	Temple (4–0)	Kansas (4–0)	North Carolina (8–1)	North Carolina (10–1)	North Carolina (12–1)	Kentucky (10–3)	Maryland (13–2)	Kentucky (14–3)	Auburn (17–0)	Kentucky (17–4)	Maryland (19–3)	Stanford (19–4)	Cincinnati (21–4)	Stanford (22–5)	Stanford (24–5)	Utah (27–4)	St. John's (25–8) т	6.
7.	Temple	Kansas (3–0)	Cincinnati (4–0)	Stanford (4–2)	Stanford (5–2)	Stanford (7–2)	Arizona (6–0)	Purdue (12–2)	North Carolina (14–3)	Kentucky (15–4)	Auburn (18–1)	Auburn (20–1)	Maryland (20–4)	St. John's (20–6)	St. John's (22–6)	Cincinnati (25–4)	Stanford (25–6)	Auburn (29–4)	7.
8.	Kansas	North Carolina (3–0)	Kentucky (5–1)	Kansas (5–1)	Purdue (10–1)	Purdue (11–1)	Purdue (12–2)	UCLA (9–2)	Arizona (11–1)	North Carolina (15–4)	Michigan State (16–4)	Michigan State (18–4)	St. John's (18–6)	Stanford (20–5)	Cincinnati (23–4)	Utah (24–4)	St. John's (25–8)	Maryland (28–6)	8.
9.	Tennessee	Michigan State (2–1)	Michigan State (4–1)	Purdue (7–1)	Arizona (5–0)	Arizona (6–0)	North Carolina (12–2)	St. John's (11–2)	Auburn (15–0)	St. John's (15–3)	North Carolina (17–4)	North Carolina (18–5)	Kentucky (20–4)	Kentucky (20–6)	Arizona (20–4)	St. John's (23–7)	Cincinnati (26–5)	Stanford (26–7)	9.
10.	Xavier	Xavier (2–0)	Temple (4–1)	Arizona (4–0)	Indiana (10–2)	Indiana (11–2)	Indiana (12–2)	North Carolina (13–3)	Michigan State (12–4)	Michigan State (14–4)	St. John's (16–4)	St. John's (17–5)	North Carolina (19–6)	Arizona (18–4)	Ohio State (21–6)	Miami (FL) (21–5)	Arizona (22–6)	Utah (28–5)	10.
11.	North Carolina	Purdue (4–0)	Syracuse (5–0)	Indiana (8–1)	Kansas (6–2)	Kansas (8–2)	UCLA (7–2)	Arizona (8–1)	Purdue (13–3)	Arizona (12–2)	UCLA (14–4)	Arizona (15–3)	Arizona (16–4)	Ohio State (19–6)	Kentucky (21–7)	Arizona (20–6)	Kentucky (25–8)	Cincinnati (27–6)	11.
12.	Utah	UCLA (1–0)	Purdue (6–1)	Syracuse (7–1)	New Mexico (6–0)	UCLA (6–2)	St. John's (10–2)	Michigan State (11–3)	UCLA (11–3)	UCLA (12–4)	Arizona (13–3)	Wisconsin (19–3)	UCLA (17–5)	North Carolina (19–7)	Utah (22–4)	Ohio State (22–7)	Miami (FL) (22–6)	Gonzaga (28–7) т	12.
13.	UCLA	Indiana (4–0)	Arizona (3–0)	Michigan State (4–3)	UCLA (5–2)	New Mexico (7–0)	Michigan State (9–3)	Indiana (14–3)	St. John's (13–3)	New Mexico (16–2)	Wisconsin (18–3)	UCLA (15–5)	Ohio State (17–6)	Utah (20–4) т	Miami (FL) (19–5)	UCLA (21–7)	North Carolina (24–9)	Miami (FL) (23–7) т	13.
14.	Washington	Cincinnati (1–0)	Washington (4–0)	Temple (4–3)	Michigan State (6–3)	Michigan State (6–3)	Kansas (8–3)	Auburn (13–0)	Kansas (11–3)	Purdue (14–4)	Purdue (15–5)	Iowa (15–4)	Wisconsin (19–5)	Wisconsin (21–5) т	North Carolina (21–7)	Kentucky (22–8)	Ohio State (23–8)	Temple (24–11)	14.
15.	Cincinnati	Arizona (1–0)	Oklahoma State (4–0)	New Mexico (5–0)	St. John's (8–2)	St. John's (9–2)	Auburn (11–0)	New Mexico (12–1)	New Mexico (14–2)	Iowa (13–2)	Indiana (16–6)	Ohio State (16–6)	Indiana (18–7)	UCLA (17–7)	Wisconsin (21–6)	North Carolina (22–8)	UCLA (22–8)	Iowa (20–10)	15.
16.	Purdue	Washington (1–0)	Indiana (6–1)	UCLA (4–2)	Clemson (8–1)	Clemson (9–1)	Clemson (10–1)	Kansas (9–3)	Iowa (12–1)	Wisconsin (16–3)	Syracuse (14–5)	Syracuse (15–6)	Utah (18–4)	Miami (FL) (17–5)	UCLA (19–7)	College of Charleston (28–2)	College of Charleston (28–2)	Arizona (22–7)	16.
17.	Indiana	Oklahoma State (3–0)	Arkansas (5–1)	Washington (4–2)	Oklahoma State (5–2)	Auburn (11–0)	New Mexico (8–1)	Minnesota (9–1)	Minnesota (10–2)	Minnesota (11–3)	Ohio State (15–5)	Purdue (15–6)	Syracuse (16–7)	Indiana (19–8)	Indiana (20–9)	Indiana (22–9)	Wisconsin (22–9)	Florida (22–9)	17.
18.	Oklahoma State	Syracuse (2–0)	New Mexico (4–0)	Pittsburgh (7–2)	Auburn (9–0)	Minnesota (7–1)	Minnesota (8–1)	Arkansas (11–2)	Syracuse (11–3)	Indiana (16–5)	Iowa (13–4)	New Mexico (17–4)	Iowa (15–6)	Purdue (18–7)	College of Charleston (25–2)	Wisconsin (21–8)	Indiana (22–10)	North Carolina (24–10)	18.
19.	Arkansas	Arkansas (4–1)	UCLA (2–2)	Clemson (7–1)	Pittsburgh (7–4)	Oklahoma State (6–3)	Arkansas (9–2)	Iowa (11–1)	Wisconsin (14–3)	Kansas (12–4)	New Mexico (16–4)	Indiana (17–7)	Purdue (16–7)	Syracuse (17–8)	Iowa (17–7)	Iowa (18–8)	Arkansas (22–10)	Oklahoma (22–11)	19.
20.	Arizona	New Mexico (2–0)	Utah (3–2)	St. John's (6–2)	Syracuse (7–3)	Arkansas (8–2)	Wisconsin (12–1)	Clemson (11–3)	Indiana (14–5)	Syracuse (12–4)	Kansas (13–5)	Minnesota (13–5)	Minnesota (14–6)	Iowa (16–7)	Syracuse (18–9)	Syracuse (19–10)	Iowa (18–9)	Miami (OH) (24–8)	20.
21.	New Mexico	Utah (1–1)	Pittsburgh (6–1)	Oklahoma State (4–2)	Minnesota (6–0) т	Syracuse (7–3)	Oklahoma State (7–3)	Syracuse (10–3)	Oklahoma State (11–3)	Arkansas (13–4)	Minnesota (12–4)	Oklahoma State (15–5)	Miami (FL) (15–5)	College of Charleston (23–2)	New Mexico (21–6)	New Mexico (22–7)	Syracuse (21–11)	UCLA (22–9)	21.
22.	Syracuse	Tennessee (2–2)	Xavier (4–2)	Utah (4–3)	Temple (4–4) т	Pittsburgh (7–4)	Syracuse (8–3)	Oklahoma State (9–3)	Arkansas (11–4)	TCU (14–3)	Arkansas (14–5)	Kansas (14–6)	Kansas (18–6)	New Mexico (20–6)	Purdue (18–9)	Texas (18–11)	Kansas (22–9)	Purdue (21–13)	22.
23.	UMass	St. John's (2–0)	Miami (OH) (3–0)	Arkansas (5–2)	Arkansas (6–2)	Wisconsin (10–1)	Pittsburgh (8–4)	Wisconsin (12–3)	Ohio State (13–3)	Oklahoma State (12–4)	Oklahoma State (13–5)	Arkansas (15–6)	New Mexico (17–6)	Minnesota (14–8)	Texas (17–10)	Florida (19–7)	Texas (19–12)	Kansas (23–10)	23.
24.	TCU	Clemson (3–0)	Clemson (5–1)	Auburn (8–0)	Wisconsin (9–1)	Temple (6–4)	Iowa (9–1)	TCU (12–2)	TCU (12–2)	Ohio State (13–5)	TCU (15–4)	Utah (16–4)	Florida (16–5)	Florida (17–6)	Florida (18–6)	Minnesota (17–9)	New Mexico (24–8)	SW Missouri State (22–11)	24.
25.	Rhode Island	UMass (1–1)	St. John's (3–2)	Tennessee (6–2)	Tennessee (6–3) т Washington (4–3) т	Iowa (8–1)	Temple (6–4)	Ohio State (12–3)	Clemson (12–4)	Oklahoma (13–4)	Miami (FL) (12–4)	Gonzaga (18–4)	College of Charleston (21–2)	Texas (17–10) (15–10)	Minnesota (15–8)	Tennessee (20–7)	Florida (20–8)	Arkansas (23–11)	25.
	Preseason	Week 2 Nov. 25	Week 3 Dec. 2	Week 4 Dec. 9	Week 5 Dec. 16	Week 6 Dec. 23	Week 7 Dec. 30	Week 8 Jan. 6	Week 9 Jan. 13	Week 10 Jan. 20	Week 11 Jan. 27	Week 12 Feb. 3	Week 13 Feb. 10	Week 14 Feb. 17	Week 15 Feb. 24	Week 16 Mar. 3	Week 17 Mar. 10	Final Apr. 4	
		Dropped: TCU; Rhode Island (3–2)	Dropped: Tennessee (4–2); UMass	Dropped: Miami (OH) (5–1); Xavier (5–3)	Dropped: Utah	Dropped: Tennessee; Washington	None	Dropped: Pittsburgh (9–5); Temple	None	Dropped: Clemson (13–5)	Dropped: Oklahoma	Dropped: TCU (16–5); Miami (FL) (13–5)	Dropped: Oklahoma State; Arkansas (15–8); Gonzaga	Dropped: Kansas (18–8)	None	Dropped: Purdue (18–10)	Dropped: Minnesota (17–10); Missouri (20–8)	Dropped: College of Charleston (28–3); Wisconsin (22–10); Indiana (23–11); Syracuse (21–12); Texas (19–13); New Mexico (25–9)	
