= Big 12 Conference men's basketball tournament =

U.S. collegiate basketball event

- Conference basketball championship
- Sport: Basketball
- Conference: Big 12 Conference
- Number of teams: 16
- Format: Single-elimination tournament
- Current stadium: T-Mobile Center
- Current location: Kansas City, Missouri
- Played: 1997–present
- Last contest: 2026
- Current champion: Arizona Wildcats (1st title)
- Most championships: Kansas Jayhawks (11)
- TV partner: ESPN
- Official website: Big12Sports.com Men's Basketball

Sponsors
- Phillips 66 (1997–present)

Host stadiums
- T-Mobile Center (2008, 2010–2031); Ford Center (2007, 2009); American Airlines Center (2003–2004, 2006); Kemper Arena (1997–2002, 2005)

Host locations
- Kansas City, Missouri (1997–2002, 2005, 2008, 2010–2031); Oklahoma City, Oklahoma (2007, 2009); Dallas, Texas (2003–2004, 2006)

The Big 12 Conference men's basketball tournament is the championship men's basketball tournament in the Big 12 Conference. It is a single-elimination tournament of four rounds, with the top six seeds getting byes in the first round. Seeding is based on regular season records. The winner of the tournament receives the Big 12 Conference's automatic bid in the NCAA Division I men's basketball tournament.

Between 2005 and 2019, no current Big 12 member besides Iowa State or Kansas won the tournament, and those two schools have won 18 of 27 titles. The remaining current Big 12 schools only account for six additional tournament titles. For its first twenty-three years, no school from outside the original Big Eight Conference had ever won the tournament. This streak ended when the Texas Longhorns won the championship game against Oklahoma State in 2021.

The tournament has been held since 2010 at the T-Mobile Center (formerly Sprint Center) in Kansas City, Missouri, under long-term contracts most recently renewed in 2024.

== History ==
Former logo

The tournament has been held every year since the first full basketball season was completed in 1997. (The Big 12 was formed in 1996) Since that time, it was held in Kemper Arena in Kansas City, Missouri in early March for every year up until 2003, and also in 2005. In 2003, 2004, and 2006 it was held at the American Airlines Center in Dallas, Texas, and in 2007 it was held in the Ford Center at Oklahoma City, Oklahoma. In 2008 it was again held in Kansas City, but this time at the Sprint Center.

The 2009 edition of the championship was held in Oklahoma City, with the event returning to Kansas City from 2010 through 2020. On October 24, 2018, it was announced that the Big 12 Tournament would stay in Kansas City through 2024. In March 2024, the contract was renewed through 2031, with Kansas City also becoming the host of the Big 12 women's tournament.

Kansas has won the most Big 12 postseason titles as well, winning 11 out of 29, while appearing in 15 championship games.

== Tournament champions ==
Numbers in parentheses refer to each team's finish/seed in the tournament for that year. Teams are seeded in order of highest conference record. Tie-breakers are based on conference record starting with:

- Head-to-head
- Record against highest standing team in conference, continuing down until one team gains an advantage
- Conference road games
- Road record against highest standing team, continuing down
- Draw, starting with highest seed to be determined
- Ties among more than two teams are broken similarly by comparing the "mini round-robin" record among tied teams, reverting to the above when elimination narrows it to two tied teams

Year	Champion	Runner-up	Tournament MVP	Location	Attendance
1997	(1) Kansas 87	(10) Missouri 60	Paul Pierce, Kansas	Kemper Arena – Kansas City, MO	114,420
1998	(1) Kansas 72	(3) Oklahoma 58	Paul Pierce, Kansas	Kemper Arena – Kansas City, MO	89,200
1999	(3) Kansas 53	(5) Oklahoma State 37	Jeff Boschee, Kansas	Kemper Arena – Kansas City, MO	106,600
2000	(1) Iowa State 70	(3) Oklahoma 58	Marcus Fizer, Iowa State	Kemper Arena – Kansas City, MO	114,600
2001	(3) Oklahoma 54	(4) Texas 45	Nolan Johnson, Oklahoma	Kemper Arena – Kansas City, MO	91,500
2002	(2) Oklahoma 64	(1) Kansas 55	Hollis Price, Oklahoma	Kemper Arena – Kansas City, MO	104,740
2003	(3) Oklahoma 49	(5) Missouri 47	Hollis Price, Oklahoma	American Airlines Center – Dallas, TX	94,800
2004	(1) Oklahoma State 65	(2) Texas 49	Tony Allen, Oklahoma State	American Airlines Center – Dallas, TX	105,610
2005	(3) Oklahoma State 72	(4) Texas Tech 68	Joey Graham, Oklahoma State	Kemper Arena – Kansas City, MO	109,608
2006	(2) Kansas 80	(1) Texas 68	Mario Chalmers, Kansas	American Airlines Center – Dallas, TX	109,428
2007†	(1) Kansas 88	(3) Texas 84	Kevin Durant, Texas	Ford Center – Oklahoma City, OK	113,274
2008	(2) Kansas 84	(1) Texas 74	Brandon Rush, Kansas	Sprint Center – Kansas City, MO	113,254
2009	(3) Missouri 73	(9) Baylor 60	DeMarre Carroll, Missouri	Ford Center – Oklahoma City, OK	94,614
2010	(1) Kansas 72	(2) Kansas State 64	Sherron Collins, Kansas	Sprint Center – Kansas City, MO	113,398
2011	(1) Kansas 85	(2) Texas 73	Marcus Morris, Kansas	Sprint Center – Kansas City, MO	113,490
2012	(2) Missouri 90	(4) Baylor 75	Kim English, Missouri	Sprint Center – Kansas City, MO	94,894
2013	(1) Kansas 70	(2) Kansas State 54	Jeff Withey, Kansas	Sprint Center – Kansas City, MO	90,687
2014	(4) Iowa State 74	(7) Baylor 65	DeAndre Kane, Iowa State	Sprint Center – Kansas City, MO	94,996
2015	(2) Iowa State 70	(1) Kansas 66	Georges Niang, Iowa State	Sprint Center – Kansas City, MO	94,963
2016	(1) Kansas 81	(2) West Virginia 71	Devonte' Graham, Kansas	Sprint Center – Kansas City, MO	94,934
2017	(4) Iowa State 80	(2) West Virginia 74	Monte Morris, Iowa State	Sprint Center – Kansas City, MO	94,934
2018	(1) Kansas 81‡	(3) West Virginia 70	Malik Newman, Kansas	Sprint Center – Kansas City, MO	89,249
2019	(5) Iowa State 78	(3) Kansas 66	Marial Shayok, Iowa State	Sprint Center – Kansas City, MO	94,847
2020	Canceled due to the COVID-19 pandemic				
2021	(3) Texas 91	(5) Oklahoma State 86	Matt Coleman, Texas	T-Mobile Center* – Kansas City, MO	13,824‡
2022	(1) Kansas 74	(3) Texas Tech 65	Ochai Agbaji, Kansas	T-Mobile Center* – Kansas City, MO	79,846
2023	(2) Texas 76	(1) Kansas 56	Dylan Disu, Texas	T-Mobile Center* – Kansas City, MO	90,110
2024	(2) Iowa State 69	(1) Houston 41	Keshon Gilbert, Iowa State	T-Mobile Center* – Kansas City, MO	118,300
2025	(1) Houston 72	(3) Arizona 64	Emanuel Sharp, Houston	T-Mobile Center* – Kansas City, MO	106,259
2026	(1) Arizona 79	(2) Houston 74	Jaden Bradley, Arizona	T-Mobile Center* – Kansas City, MO	107,974
2027				T-Mobile Center* – Kansas City, MO	
2028				T-Mobile Center* – Kansas City, MO	
2029				T-Mobile Center* – Kansas City, MO	
2030				T-Mobile Center* – Kansas City, MO	
2031				T-Mobile Center* – Kansas City, MO	
Reference: † – Denotes overtime played

‡The Kansas Jayhawks tournament win was later vacated by the NCAA due to recruiting violations.
*From its opening to July 2020, T-Mobile Center was known as Sprint Center, but the arena was rebranded following the merger of T-Mobile and Sprint.
‡Attendance at the 2021 Tournament was limited due to the COVID-19 pandemic.

== Results by team ==
=== Tournament record ===
School	W	L	Pct.	Championships	Runners-Up	Championship Years
Kansas†	51	16	.761	11†	4	1997, 1998, 1999, 2006, 2007, 2008, 2010, 2011, 2013, 2016, 2022
Iowa State	27	24	.529	6	0	2000, 2014, 2015; 2017, 2019, 2024
Oklahoma State	29	26	.527	2	2	2004, 2005
Arizona	5	1	.833	1	1	2026
Houston	7	2	.778	1	2	2025
Baylor	19	27	.413	0	3	−
West Virginia	10	12	.455	0	3	−
Kansas State	19	29	.396	0	2	−
Texas Tech	18	29	.383	0	2	−
BYU	4	3	.571	0	0	−
Cincinnati	4	3	.571	0	0	−
UCF	3	3	.500	0	0	−
TCU	9	14	.391	0	0	−
Colorado	11	17	.393	0	0	−
Arizona State	1	2	.333	0	0	−
Utah	0	2	.000	0	0	−

†The Kansas Jayhawks three tournament victories & tournament Championship was later vacated by the NCAA due to recruiting violations.

=== Former Teams Tournament record ===
School	W	L	Pct.
Missouri	19	14	.576
Texas	26	24	.520
Oklahoma	23	22	.511
Nebraska	6	15	.286
Texas A&M	6	16	.273
Reference: Italics denote former conference member

=== Former Teams Championship game record ===
Appearances	School	W	L	Pct.
5	Oklahoma	3	2	.600
8	Texas	2	6	.143
4	Missouri	2	2	.500
0	Nebraska	0	0	N/A
0	Texas A&M	0	0	N/A
Reference: Italics denote former conference member.

== See also ==
- Big Eight Conference men's basketball tournament
- Southwest Conference men's basketball tournament
- Big 12 women's basketball tournament
