= Boschee =

Boschee is a surname. Notable people with the surname include:

- Jeff Boschee (born 1979), American basketball player and coach
- Joshua Boschee (born 1982), American politician
