= Texas Tech Red Raiders basketball under James Dickey =

College head coaching tenure

James Dickey coached the Texas Tech Red Raiders basketball teams from 1991 to 2001.

== 1991–92 ==
1991–92 Texas Tech Red Raiders basketball
- Conference: Southwest Conference
- Record: 15–14 (6–8 SWC)
- Head coach: James Dickey (1st season)
- Assistant coach: Doc Sadler (1st season)
- Home arena: Lubbock Municipal Coliseum

1991–92 Southwest Conference men's basketball standings
	Conf.				Overall
Team	W		L	PCT	W		L	PCT
Houston †	11	–	3	.786	25	–	6	.806
Texas	11	–	3	.786	23	–	12	.657
TCU	9	–	5	.643	23	–	11	.676
Rice	8	–	6	.571	20	–	11	.645
Texas Tech	6	–	8	.429	15	–	14	.517
Baylor	5	–	9	.357	13	–	15	.464
SMU	4	–	10	.286	10	–	18	.357
Texas A&M	2	–	12	.143	6	–	22	.214
† 1992 SWC tournament winner Rankings from AP poll

== 1993–94 ==
1993–94 Texas Tech Red Raiders basketball
- Conference: Southwest Conference
- Record: 17–11 (10–4 SWC)
- Head coach: James Dickey (3rd season)
- Assistant coach: Doc Sadler (3rd season)
- Home arena: Lubbock Municipal Coliseum

1993–94 Southwest Conference men's basketball standings
	Conf.				Overall
Team	W		L	PCT	W		L	PCT
No. 20 Texas †	12	–	2	.857	26	–	8	.765
Texas A&M	10	–	4	.714	19	–	11	.633
Texas Tech	10	–	4	.714	17	–	11	.607
Baylor	7	–	7	.500	16	–	11	.593
Rice	6	–	8	.429	15	–	14	.517
Houston	5	–	9	.357	8	–	19	.296
SMU	3	–	11	.214	6	–	21	.222
TCU	3	–	11	.214	7	–	20	.259
† 1994 SWC tournament winner Rankings from AP Poll

== 1996–97 ==
1996–97 Texas Tech Red Raiders basketball
- Conference: Big 12 Conference
- South
- Record: 19–9 (0–6 Big 12, 10 wins vacated)
- Head coach: James Dickey (6th season)
- Assistant coach: Will Flemons (3rd season)
- Home arena: Lubbock Municipal Coliseum

1996–97 Big 12 men's basketball standings
	Conf.				Overall
Team	W		L	PCT	W		L	PCT
No. 1 Kansas †	15	–	1	.938	34	–	2	.944
No. 24 Colorado	11	–	5	.688	22	–	10	.688
Texas	10	–	6	.625	18	–	12	.600
No. 18 Iowa State	10	–	6	.625	22	–	9	.710
Texas Tech	10	–	6	.625	19	–	9	.679
Oklahoma	9	–	7	.563	19	–	11	.633
Nebraska	7	–	9	.438	18	–	15	.545
Oklahoma State	7	–	9	.438	17	–	15	.531
Baylor	6	–	10	.375	18	–	12	.600
Missouri	5	–	11	.313	16	–	17	.485
Texas A&M	3	–	13	.188	9	–	18	.333
Kansas State	3	–	13	.188	10	–	17	.370
† 1997 Big 12 Tournament winner Rankings from AP poll

The Texas Tech Red Raiders became a charter member of the Big 12 Conference. Due to NCAA violations, Texas Tech was forced to vacate all conference wins during the 1996–97 NCAA Division I men's basketball season and two postseason wins during the 1996 NCAA Men's Division I Basketball Tournament

== 1997–98 ==
1997–98 Texas Tech Red Raiders basketball
- Conference: Big 12 Conference
- Record: 13–14 (7–9 Big 12)
- Head coach: James Dickey (7th season)
- Home arena: Lubbock Municipal Coliseum

1997–98 Big 12 men's basketball standings
	Conf.				Overall
Team	W		L	PCT	W		L	PCT
No. 2 Kansas †	15	–	1	.938	35	–	4	.897
Oklahoma State	11	–	5	.688	22	–	7	.759
Oklahoma	11	–	5	.688	22	–	11	.667
Nebraska	10	–	6	.625	20	–	12	.625
Baylor	8	–	8	.500	14	–	14	.500
Missouri	8	–	8	.500	17	–	15	.531
Texas Tech	7	–	9	.438	13	–	14	.481
Kansas State	7	–	9	.438	17	–	12	.586
Colorado	7	–	9	.438	13	–	14	.481
Texas	6	–	10	.375	14	–	17	.452
Iowa State	5	–	11	.313	12	–	18	.400
Texas A&M	1	–	15	.063	7	–	20	.259
† 1998 Big 12 Tournament winner Rankings from AP poll

== 1998–99 ==
1998–99 Texas Tech Red Raiders basketball
- Conference: Big 12 Conference
- Record: 13–17 (5–11 Big 12)
- Head coach: James Dickey (8th season)
- Home arena: Lubbock Municipal Coliseum

1998–99 Big 12 men's basketball standings
	Conf.				Overall
Team	W		L	PCT	W		L	PCT
Texas	13	–	3	.813	19	–	13	.594
Missouri	11	–	5	.688	20	–	9	.690
No. 22 Kansas †	11	–	5	.688	23	–	10	.697
Oklahoma	11	–	5	.688	22	–	11	.667
Oklahoma State	10	–	6	.625	23	–	11	.676
Nebraska	10	–	6	.625	20	–	13	.606
Kansas State	7	–	9	.438	20	–	13	.606
Colorado	7	–	9	.438	18	–	15	.545
Iowa State	6	–	10	.375	15	–	15	.500
Texas A&M	5	–	11	.313	12	–	15	.444
Texas Tech	5	–	11	.313	13	–	17	.433
Baylor	0	–	16	.000	6	–	24	.200
† 1999 Big 12 Tournament winner Rankings from AP poll

== 1999–2000 ==
1999–2000 Texas Tech Red Raiders basketball
- Conference: Big 12 Conference
- Record: 12–16 (3–13 Big 12)
- Head coach: James Dickey (9th season)
- Assistant coaches: Will Flemons (4th season); Alvin Brooks (1st season)
- Home arena: United Spirit Arena

1999–2000 Big 12 men's basketball standings
	Conf.				Overall
Team	W		L	PCT	W		L	PCT
No. 6 Iowa State †	14	–	2	.875	32	–	5	.865
No. 15 Texas	13	–	3	.813	24	–	9	.727
No. 12 Oklahoma	12	–	4	.750	27	–	7	.794
No. 14 Oklahoma State	12	–	4	.750	27	–	7	.794
Kansas	11	–	5	.688	24	–	10	.706
Missouri	10	–	6	.625	18	–	13	.581
Colorado	7	–	9	.438	18	–	14	.563
Nebraska	4	–	12	.250	11	–	19	.367
Baylor	4	–	12	.250	14	–	15	.483
Texas A&M	4	–	12	.250	8	–	20	.286
Texas Tech	3	–	13	.188	12	–	16	.429
Kansas State	2	–	14	.125	9	–	19	.321
† 2000 Big 12 Tournament winner Rankings from AP poll

== 2000–01 ==
2000–01 Texas Tech Red Raiders basketball
- Conference: Big 12 Conference
- Record: 9–19 (3–13 Big 12)
- Head coach: James Dickey (10th season)
- Assistant coaches: Will Flemons (5th season); Alvin Brooks (2nd season)
- Home arena: United Spirit Arena

2000–01 Big 12 men's basketball standings
	Conf.				Overall
Team	W		L	PCT	W		L	PCT
No. 10 Iowa State	13	–	3	.813	25	–	6	.806
No. 12 Kansas	12	–	4	.750	26	–	7	.788
No. 13 Oklahoma †	12	–	4	.750	26	–	7	.788
No. 18 Texas	12	–	4	.750	25	–	9	.735
Oklahoma State	10	–	6	.625	20	–	10	.667
Missouri	9	–	7	.563	20	–	13	.606
Nebraska	7	–	9	.438	14	–	16	.467
Baylor	6	–	10	.375	19	–	12	.613
Colorado	5	–	11	.313	15	–	15	.500
Kansas State	4	–	12	.250	11	–	18	.379
Texas A&M	3	–	13	.188	10	–	20	.333
Texas Tech	3	–	13	.188	9	–	19	.321
† 2001 Big 12 Tournament winner Rankings from AP poll
