= Texas Longhorns men's basketball, 1990–1999 =

American collegiate basketball team results

== 1996–97 season ==
=== Schedule and results ===
1996–97 Big 12 men's basketball standings
| | Conf. | | | | Overall |
| Team | W | | L | PCT | W | | L | PCT |
|---|---|---|---|---|---|---|---|---|
| No. 1 Kansas † | 15 | – | 1 | .938 | 34 | – | 2 | .944 |
| No. 24 Colorado | 11 | – | 5 | .688 | 22 | – | 10 | .688 |
| Texas | 10 | – | 6 | .625 | 18 | – | 12 | .600 |
| No. 18 Iowa State | 10 | – | 6 | .625 | 22 | – | 9 | .710 |
| Texas Tech | 10 | – | 6 | .625 | 19 | – | 9 | .679 |
| Oklahoma | 9 | – | 7 | .563 | 19 | – | 11 | .633 |
| Nebraska | 7 | – | 9 | .438 | 18 | – | 15 | .545 |
| Oklahoma State | 7 | – | 9 | .438 | 17 | – | 15 | .531 |
| Baylor | 6 | – | 10 | .375 | 18 | – | 12 | .600 |
| Missouri | 5 | – | 11 | .313 | 16 | – | 17 | .485 |
| Texas A&M | 3 | – | 13 | .188 | 9 | – | 18 | .333 |
| Kansas State | 3 | – | 13 | .188 | 10 | – | 17 | .370 |
† 1997 Big 12 Tournament winner Rankings from AP poll

Coach: Tom Penders; Overall record: 18–12; Big 12 Record: 10–6; Big 12 Standing: T-3rd; Final AP Poll: NR; Final ESPN/USA Today Coaches' Poll: 20
| Date | Opponent^{#} | Rank^{#} | Site | Result | TV | Record |
Regular season
| Sat, Nov 23 | Nebraska | 17 | Frank Erwin Center • Austin, Texas | W 83–81 ^{OT} | Prime Sports, 7 P.M. | 1–0 |
| Wed, Nov 27 | Rhode Island | 18 | Frank Erwin Center • Austin, Texas | W 86–79 | Prime Sports, 7 P.M. | 2–0 |
| Wed, Dec 4 | @ Florida | 18 | Stephen C. O'Connell Center • Gainesville, Florida | W 82–64 | Sunshine, 6 P.M., | 3–0 |
| Sat, Dec 7 | North Texas | 18 | Frank Erwin Center • Austin, Texas | W 71–56 | Prime Sports, 7 P.M. | 4–0 |
| Mon, Dec 9 | @ #5 Arizona | 18 | McKale Center • Tucson, Arizona | L 78–83 | Fox Sports Net, 8:30 P.M. | 4–1 |
| Sat, Dec 14 | #16 Fresno State | 13 | Frank Erwin Center • Austin, Texas | W 98–86 | CBS, 3 P.M. | 5–1 |
| Wed, Dec 18 | @ Oregon State | 14 | Gill Coliseum • Corvallis, Oregon | W 86–83 | Fox Sports Net, 9:30 P.M. | 6–1 |
| Sat, Dec 21 | @ #9 Utah | 14 | Jon M. Huntsman Center • Salt Lake City, Utah | L 68–80 | Local, 8:30 P.M. | 6–2 |
| Tue, Dec 31 | @ Providence | 18 | Alumni Hall • Providence, Rhode Island | L 66–74 | ESPN2, 5:30 P.M. | 6–3 |
| Sat, Jan 4 | Oklahoma State* | 18 | Frank Erwin Center • Austin, Texas | W 92–58 | Prime Sports, TBA | 7–3 (1–0 Big 12) |
| Mon, Jan 6 | @ #1 Kansas* | 18 | Allen Fieldhouse • Lawrence, Kansas | L 61–86 | ESPN, 8:30 P.M. | 7–4 (1–1) |
| Sun, Jan 12 | Kansas State* | 22 | Frank Erwin Center • Austin, Texas | W 104–63 | Creative Sports, TBA | 8–4 (2–1) |
| Wed, Jan 15 | @ Texas A&M* | 23 | G. Rollie White Coliseum • College Station, Texas | W 86–76 ^{OT} | Creative Sports, 8 P.M. | 9–4 (3–1) |
| Sun, Jan 19 | #10 Louisville | 23 | Frank Erwin Center • Austin, Texas | L 78–85 ^{OT} | CBS, 1:30 P.M. | 9–5 |
| Wed, Jan 22 | Oklahoma* | 23 | Frank Erwin Center • Austin, Texas | W 76–66 | Prime Sports, TBA | 10–5 (4–1) |
| Sun, Jan 26 | Missouri* | 23 | Frank Erwin Center • Austin, Texas | W 78–74 | CBS, 1 P.M. | 11–5 (5–1) |
| Wed, Jan 29 | @ Baylor* | 23 | Ferrell Center • Waco, Texas | L 72–76 | Prime Sports, 7 P.M. | 11–6 (5–2) |
| Sat, Feb 1 | @ Oklahoma* | 23 | Lloyd Noble Center • Norman, Oklahoma | L 69–83 | Creative Sports, 12:45 P.M. | 11–7 (5–3) |
| Mon, Feb 3 | #22 Texas Tech* | 23 | Frank Erwin Center • Austin, Texas | W 83–67 | ESPN, 8:30 P.M. | 12–7 (6–3) |
| Sat, Feb 8 | @ Oklahoma State* | — | Gallagher-Iba Arena • Stillwater, Oklahoma | W 90–73 | Creative Sports, 12:45 P.M. | 13–7 (7–3) |
| Wed, Feb 12 | Baylor* | — | Frank Erwin Center • Austin, Texas | W 70–67 | Local, TBA | 14–7 (8–3) |
| Sun, Feb 16 | @ Nebraska* | — | Devaney Center • Lincoln, Nebraska | L 67–79 | Creative Sports, 1 P.M. | 14–8 (8–4) |
| Wed, Feb 19 | #7 Iowa State* | — | Frank Erwin Center • Austin, Texas | W 57–56 | Creative Sports, 8 P.M. | 15–8 (9–4) |
| Sat, Feb 22 | @ Texas Tech* | — | Lubbock Municipal Coliseum • Lubbock, Texas | L 70–72 | Creative Sports, 12:45 P.M. | 15–9 (9–5) |
| Tue, Feb 25 | Texas A&M* | — | Frank Erwin Center • Austin, Texas | W 68–57 | Local, 7 P.M. | 16–9 (10–5) |
| Sat, Mar 1 | @ #19 Colorado* | — | Coors Events Center • Boulder, Colorado | L 60–83 | Creative Sports, 3 P.M. | 16–10 (10–6) |
1997 Big 12 Conference tournament — No. 3 Seed
| Fri, Mar 7 | vs. (6) Missouri* | — | Kemper Arena • Kansas City, Missouri (Big 12 Conference tournament quarterfinals) | L 75–80 | Creative Sports | 16–11 |
1997 NCAA tournament — No. 10 Seed
| Fri, Mar 14 | vs. (7) Wisconsin | — | Pittsburgh Civic Arena • Pittsburgh, Pennsylvania (NCAA tournament first round) | W 71–58 | CBS | 17–11 |
| Sun, Mar 16 | vs. (15) Coppin State | — | Pittsburgh Civic Arena • Pittsburgh, Pennsylvania (NCAA tournament second round) | W 82–81 | CBS | 18–11 |
| Fri, Mar 21 | vs. 25 (6) Louisville | — | Carrier Dome • Syracuse, New York (NCAA Tournament East Regional semifinal) | L 63–78 | CBS | 18–12 |
*Big 12 Conference Game. ^{#}Rank according to Associated Press (AP) Poll. ^{OT} indicates overtime.

== 1997–98 season ==
=== Schedule and results ===
1997–98 Big 12 men's basketball standings
| | Conf. | | | | Overall |
| Team | W | | L | PCT | W | | L | PCT |
|---|---|---|---|---|---|---|---|---|
| No. 2 Kansas † | 15 | – | 1 | .938 | 35 | – | 4 | .897 |
| Oklahoma State | 11 | – | 5 | .688 | 22 | – | 7 | .759 |
| Oklahoma | 11 | – | 5 | .688 | 22 | – | 11 | .667 |
| Nebraska | 10 | – | 6 | .625 | 20 | – | 12 | .625 |
| Baylor | 8 | – | 8 | .500 | 14 | – | 14 | .500 |
| Missouri | 8 | – | 8 | .500 | 17 | – | 15 | .531 |
| Texas Tech | 7 | – | 9 | .438 | 13 | – | 14 | .481 |
| Kansas State | 7 | – | 9 | .438 | 17 | – | 12 | .586 |
| Colorado | 7 | – | 9 | .438 | 13 | – | 14 | .481 |
| Texas | 6 | – | 10 | .375 | 14 | – | 17 | .452 |
| Iowa State | 5 | – | 11 | .313 | 12 | – | 18 | .400 |
| Texas A&M | 1 | – | 15 | .063 | 7 | – | 20 | .259 |
† 1998 Big 12 Tournament winner Rankings from AP poll

Coach: Tom Penders; Overall record: 14–17; Big 12 Record: 6–10; Big 12 Standing: 10th Final AP Poll: NR; Final ESPN/USA Today Coaches' Poll: NR
| Date | Opponent^{#} | Rank^{#} | Site | TV | Result | Record |
Regular season
| Tue, Nov 11 | vs. Princeton | #22 | Continental Airlines Arena • East Rutherford, New Jersey (Coaches vs. Cancer IKON Classic) | ESPN2 | L 56–62 | 0–1 |
| Wed, Nov 12 | vs. #19 Georgia | #22 | Continental Airlines Arena • East Rutherford, New Jersey (Coaches vs. Cancer IKON Classic) | | L 87–89 | 0–2 |
| Sat, Nov 22 | @ North Texas | — | UNT Coliseum • Denton, Texas | | W 116–94 | 1–2 |
| Wed, Nov 26 | Liberty | — | Frank Erwin Center • Austin, Texas | | W 98–70 | 2–2 |
| Fri, Nov 28 | @ #22 Georgia | — | Stegeman Coliseum • Athens, Georgia | | L 76–94 | 2–3 |
| Wed, Dec 3 | American | — | Frank Erwin Center • Austin, Texas | | W 78–62 | 3–3 |
| Sat, Dec 6 | #4 Arizona | — | Frank Erwin Center • Austin, Texas | ESPN | L 81–88 | 3–4 |
| Tue, Dec 9 | Florida | — | Frank Erwin Center • Austin, Texas | Local | W 85–82 | 4–4 |
| Wed, Dec 17 | Louisiana State | — | Frank Erwin Center • Austin, Texas | Fox Sports Southwest | W 69–63 | 5–4 |
| Sat, Dec 20 | @ Illinois | — | Assembly Hall • Champaign, Illinois | CBS | L 80–105 | 5–5 |
| Sat, Dec 27 | Houston | — | Frank Erwin Center • Austin, Texas | Fox Sports Southwest | W 89–71 | 6–5 |
| Sat, Jan 3 | Baylor* | — | Frank Erwin Center • Austin, Texas | Fox Sports Southwest | L 81–87 | 6–6 (0–1 Big 12) |
| Mon, Jan 5 | @ Missouri* | — | Hearnes Center • Columbia, Missouri | | L 69–91 | 6–7 (0–2) |
| Sat, Jan 10 | #4 Kansas* | — | Frank Erwin Center • Austin, Texas | CBS | L 72–102 | 6–8 (0–3) |
| Mon, Jan 12 | @ Oklahoma* | — | Lloyd Noble Center • Norman, Oklahoma | ESPN | L 75–91 | 6–9 (0–4) |
| Sat, Jan 17 | Texas Tech* | — | Frank Erwin Center • Austin, Texas | ABC | W 88–79 | 7–9 (1–4) |
| Wed, Jan 21 | Nebraska* | — | Frank Erwin Center • Austin, Texas | ESPN+ | W 105–91 | 8–9 (2–4) |
| Sat, Jan 24 | @ Fresno State | — | Selland Arena • Fresno, California | CBS | L 82–90 | 8–10 |
| Tue, Jan 27 | @ Iowa State* | — | Hilton Coliseum • Ames, Iowa | ESPN+ | L 82–85 | 8–11 (2–5) |
| Sat, Jan 31 | Oklahoma State* | — | Frank Erwin Center • Austin, Texas | ESPN+ | W 88–73 | 9–11 (3–5) |
| Mon, Feb 2 | @ Texas A&M* | — | G. Rollie White Coliseum • College Station, Texas | ESPN | W 81–80 | 10–11 (4–5) |
| Sun, Feb 8 | Oklahoma* | — | Frank Erwin Center • Austin, Texas | ABC | L 74–81 | 10–12 (4–6) |
| Wed, Feb 11 | @ Kansas State* | — | Bramlage Coliseum • Manhattan, Kansas | Fox Sports Southwest | L 79–83 | 10–13 (4–7) |
| Sat, Feb 14 | @ Texas Tech* | — | Lubbock Municipal Coliseum • Lubbock, Texas | ESPN+ | W 82–80 | 11–13 (5–7) |
| Wed, Feb 18 | Texas A&M* | — | Frank Erwin Center • Austin, Texas | Fox Sports Southwest | W 87–74 | 12–13 (6–7) |
| Sat, Feb 21 | @ Baylor* | — | Ferrell Center • Waco, Texas | ESPN | L 75–80 | 12–14 (6–8) |
| Tue, Feb 24 | @ #25 Oklahoma State* | — | Gallagher-Iba Arena • Stillwater, Oklahoma | ESPN+ | L 58–80 | 12–15 (6–9) |
| Sat, Feb 28 | Colorado* | — | Frank Erwin Center • Austin, Texas | ESPN+ | L 64–81 | 12–16 (6–10) |
1998 Big 12 Conference tournament — No. 10 Seed
| Thu, Mar 5 | vs. (7) Texas Tech* | — | Kemper Arena • Kansas City, Missouri (Big 12 Conference tournament first round) | ESPN+ | W 86–83 | 13–16 |
| Fri, Mar 6 | vs. (2) #25 Oklahoma State* | — | Kemper Arena • Kansas City, Missouri (Big 12 Conference tournament quarterfinals) | ESPN+ | W 65–64 | 14–16 |
| Sat, Mar 7 | vs. (3) Oklahoma* | — | Kemper Arena • Kansas City, Missouri (Big 12 Conference tournament semifinals) | ESPN+ | L 55–68 | 14–17 |
*Big 12 Conference Game. ^{#}Rank according to Associated Press (AP) Poll. ^{OT} indicates overtime.

== 1998–99 season ==
=== Schedule and results ===
1998–99 Big 12 men's basketball standings
| | Conf. | | | | Overall |
| Team | W | | L | PCT | W | | L | PCT |
|---|---|---|---|---|---|---|---|---|
| Texas | 13 | – | 3 | .813 | 19 | – | 13 | .594 |
| Missouri | 11 | – | 5 | .688 | 20 | – | 9 | .690 |
| No. 22 Kansas † | 11 | – | 5 | .688 | 23 | – | 10 | .697 |
| Oklahoma | 11 | – | 5 | .688 | 22 | – | 11 | .667 |
| Oklahoma State | 10 | – | 6 | .625 | 23 | – | 11 | .676 |
| Nebraska | 10 | – | 6 | .625 | 20 | – | 13 | .606 |
| Kansas State | 7 | – | 9 | .438 | 20 | – | 13 | .606 |
| Colorado | 7 | – | 9 | .438 | 18 | – | 15 | .545 |
| Iowa State | 6 | – | 10 | .375 | 15 | – | 15 | .500 |
| Texas A&M | 5 | – | 11 | .313 | 12 | – | 15 | .444 |
| Texas Tech | 5 | – | 11 | .313 | 13 | – | 17 | .433 |
| Baylor | 0 | – | 16 | .000 | 6 | – | 24 | .200 |
† 1999 Big 12 Tournament winner Rankings from AP poll

Coach: Rick Barnes; Overall record: 19–13; Big 12 Record: 13–3; Big 12 Standing: 1st Final AP Poll: NR; Final ESPN/USA Today Coaches' Poll: NR
| Date | Opponent^{#} | Rank^{#} | Site | TV | Result | Record |
Regular season
| Tue, Nov 17 | @ Houston | — | Hofheinz Pavilion • Houston, Texas | ESPN2 | L 69–71 | 0–1 |
| Sat, Nov 21 | South Florida | — | Frank Erwin Center • Austin, Texas | UT Syndicated TV | L 76–93 | 0–2 |
| Wed, Nov 25 | @ #11 Arizona | — | McKale Center • Tucson, Arizona | UT Syndicated TV | L 57–73 | 0–3 |
| Sun, Nov 29 | Georgia | — | Frank Erwin Center • Austin, Texas | Fox Sports Southwest | L 77–78 | 0–4 |
| Wed, Dec 2 | @ Oral Roberts | — | Mabee Center • Tulsa, Oklahoma | UT Syndicated TV | W 87–77 | 1–4 |
| Sat, Dec 5 | @ San Diego | — | Jenny Craig Pavilion • San Diego, California | L 57–61 | 1–5 | |
| Sat, Dec 12 | #25 Utah | — | Frank Erwin Center • Austin, Texas | UT Syndicated TV | W 73–68 | 2–5 |
| Tue, Dec 15 | #23 Wisconsin | — | Frank Erwin Center • Austin, Texas | UT Syndicated TV | L 62–65 | 2–6 |
| Sat, Dec 19 | @ LSU | — | Pete Maravich Assembly Center • Baton Rouge, Louisiana | UT Syndicated TV | L 61–63 ^{OT} | 2–7 |
| Mon, Dec 28 | vs. Mississippi State | — | Stan Sheriff Center • Honolulu, Hawaii (Outrigger Rainbow Classic) | W 81–77 | 3–7 | |
| Tue, Dec 29 | vs. Princeton | — | Stan Sheriff Center • Honolulu, Hawaii (Outrigger Rainbow Classic) | ESPN | L 46–56 | 3–8 |
| Wed, Dec 30 | @ Hawaii | — | Stan Sheriff Center • Honolulu, Hawaii (Outrigger Rainbow Classic) | Local | W 84–72 | 4–8 |
| Sat, Jan 2 | @ Colorado* | — | Coors Events Center • Boulder, Colorado | ESPN+ | W 73–68 | 5–8 (1–0 Big 12) |
| Wed, Jan 6 | Iowa State* | — | Frank Erwin Center • Austin, Texas | UT Syndicated TV | W 71–45 | 6–8 (2–0) |
| Sun, Jan 10 | @ Nebraska* | — | Devaney Center • Lincoln, Nebraska | ESPN+ | W 89–76 | 7–8 (3–0) |
| Wed, Jan 13 | Baylor* | — | Frank Erwin Center • Austin, Texas | UT Syndicated TV | W 71–56 | 8–8 (4–0) |
| Sat, Jan 16 | Kansas State* | — | Frank Erwin Center • Austin, Texas | ESPN+ | W 65–59 | 9–8 (5–0) |
| Mon, Jan 18 | @ #19 Kansas* | — | Allen Fieldhouse • Lawrence, Kansas | ESPN | L 67–76 | 9–9 (5–1) |
| Sat, Jan 23 | #23 Oklahoma State* | — | Frank Erwin Center • Austin, Texas | ESPN | W 73–70 | 10–9 (6–1) |
| Mon, Jan 25 | @ Oklahoma* | — | Lloyd Noble Center • Norman, Oklahoma | ESPN | W 64–60 | 11–9 (7–1) |
| Sun, Jan 31 | Massachusetts | — | Frank Erwin Center • Austin, Texas | ABC | W 76–65 | 12–9 |
| Wed, Feb 3 | Texas A&M* | — | Frank Erwin Center • Austin, Texas | Fox Sports Southwest | W 71–59 | 13–9 (8–1) |
| Sat, Feb 6 | @ Texas Tech* | — | Lubbock Municipal Coliseum • Lubbock, Texas | ESPN+ | W 76–59 | 14–9 (9–1) |
| Wed, Feb 10 | Oklahoma* | — | Frank Erwin Center • Austin, Texas | ESPN+ | L 63–64 | 14–10 (9–2) |
| Sun, Feb 14 | @ Oklahoma State* | — | Gallagher-Iba Arena • Stillwater, Oklahoma | ABC | W 73–68 | 15–10 (10–2) |
| Wed, Feb 17 | Texas Tech* | — | Frank Erwin Center • Austin, Texas | ESPN+ | W 62–44 | 16–10 (11–2) |
| Sat, Feb 20 | @ Texas A&M* | — | Reed Arena • College Station, Texas | ESPN+ | W 63–54 | 17–10 (12–2) |
| Wed, Feb 24 | @ Baylor* | #22 | Ferrell Center • Waco, Texas | UT Syndicated TV | W 62–52 | 18–10 (13–2) |
| Sat, Feb 27 | Missouri* | #22 | Frank Erwin Center • Austin, Texas | CBS | L 47–54 | 18–11 (13–3) |
1999 Big 12 Conference tournament — No. 1 Seed
| Fri, Mar 5 | vs. (8) Colorado* | — | Kemper Arena • Kansas City, Missouri (Big 12 Conference tournament quarterfinals) | ESPN+ | W 82–76 | 19–11 |
| Sat, Mar 6 | vs. (5) Oklahoma State* | — | Kemper Arena • Kansas City, Missouri (Big 12 Conference tournament semifinals) | ESPN+ | L 57–59 | 19–12 |
1999 NCAA tournament — No. 7 Seed
| Fri, Mar 12 | vs. (10) Purdue | — | FleetCenter • Boston, Massachusetts (NCAA tournament first round) | CBS | L 54–58 | 19–13 |
*Big 12 Conference Game. ^{#}Rank according to Associated Press (AP) Poll. ^{OT} indicates overtime.
