= James Dickey (basketball, born 1954) =

American college basketball coach (born 1954)

Biographical details
- Born: April 2, 1954 (age 72)

Playing career
- 1972–1976: Central Arkansas
- Position: Shooting guard

Coaching career (HC unless noted)
- 1976–1977: Harding University (asst.)
- 1977–1979: Harding Academy
- 1979–1981: Central Arkansas (asst.)
- 1981–1985: Arkansas (asst.)
- 1985–1989: Kentucky (asst.)
- 1990–1991: Texas Tech (asst.)
- 1991–2001: Texas Tech
- 2002–2008: Oklahoma State (asst.)
- 2010–2014: Houston
- 2014–2016: Oklahoma State (asst.)

Head coaching record
- Overall: 230–186 (.553) (college)
- Tournaments: 2–2 (NCAA Division I); 0–1 (NIT); 1–1 (CBI)

Accomplishments and honors

Championships
- 2 SWC tournament (1993, 1996); 2 SWC regular season (1995, 1996)

Awards
- 3× SWC Coach of the Year (1992, 1995, 1996)

James Allen Dickey (born April 2, 1954) is an American college basketball coach and current Senior Advisor of men's basketball at West Virginia University. He was most recently an assistant coach at Oklahoma State University. He previously served as the men's head coach at Texas Tech University from 1991 to 2001, where he led the Red Raiders to the NCAA tournament in 1993 and again in 1996, and at the University of Houston from 2010 to 2014.

== Biography ==
=== Early years ===
Dickey attended Valley Springs High School, where he played basketball from 1970 to 1972. He later played for Central Arkansas from 1972 to 1976.

=== Coaching career ===
Dickey's best team was the Texas Tech's 1996 unit, which finished 30–2, including an undefeated record in the final season of Southwest Conference play. They won the SWC conference tournament and advanced all the way to the Sweet 16 of the NCAA Tournament.

The Raiders moved to the Big 12 for the 1996–97 season, and appeared to pick up right where they left off with a solid 19–9 season. It was discovered during the inaugural Big 12 basketball tournament, however, that two players had played the entire season while academically ineligible. Hours after the team's first-round game, Texas Tech announced that it was withdrawing from postseason consideration and forfeiting its entire conference schedule. The Raiders had lost that game, and would have had to forfeit it if they had won.

A subsequent investigation revealed massive violations dating back to 1990 in men's basketball and nine other sports (though Dickey himself was not personally implicated). As a result, the NCAA stripped Tech of its two NCAA tournament wins in 1996 and docked it nine scholarships over four years. The lost scholarships were too much for Dickey to overcome, and he tallied four straight losing seasons before being fired in 2001.

He was announced as the head coach of the Houston Cougars on April 1, 2010.

After four seasons and a 64–62 record, Dickey resigned his position as head coach.

== Head coaching record ==
=== College ===
Record table
Season	Team	Overall	Conference	Standing	Postseason
Texas Tech Red Raiders (Southwest Conference) (1991–1996)
1991–92	Texas Tech	15–14	6–8	5th	
1992–93	Texas Tech	18–12	6–8	5th	NCAA Division I First Round
1993–94	Texas Tech	17–11	10–4	T–2nd	
1994–95	Texas Tech	20–10	11–3	T–1st	NIT First Round
1995–96	Texas Tech	30–2*	14–0	1st	NCAA Division I Sweet 16*
Texas Tech Red Raiders (Big 12 Conference) (1996–2001)
1996–97	Texas Tech	19–9	10–6**	12th	
1997–98	Texas Tech	13–14	7–9	T–7th	
1998–99	Texas Tech	13–17	5–11	11th	
1999–00	Texas Tech	12–16	3–13	12th	
2000–01	Texas Tech	9–19	3–13	12th	
Texas Tech:		166–124 (.572)†	75–75 (.500)		
Houston Cougars (Conference USA) (2010–2013)
2010–11	Houston	12–18	4–12	11th	
2011–12	Houston	15–15	7–9	T–8th	
2012–13	Houston	20–13	7–9	T–7th	CBI Quarterfinal
Houston Cougars (American Athletic Conference) (2013–2014)
2013–14	Houston	17–16	8–10	6th	
Houston:		64–62 (.508)	26–40 (.394)		
Total:		230–186 (.553)			
National champion Postseason invitational champion Conference regular season champion Conference regular season and conference tournament champion Division regular season champion Division regular season and conference tournament champion Conference tournament champion

*Texas Tech vacated its 1996 NCAA tournament appearance due to ineligible players; official record is 28–1.
**Texas Tech forfeited its entire 1996–97 conference slate due to ineligible players, but Dickey was ruled not to have been affected.
†Official record at Texas Tech is 166–124 (.572) without vacated games.
