= 1991–92 Texas Longhorns men's basketball team =

American college basketball season

1991–92 Texas Longhorns men's basketball

SWC Regular Season co-champions

NCAA tournament, first round
- Conference: Southwest Conference
- Record: 23–12 (11–3 SWC)
- Head coach: Tom Penders (4th season)
- Home arena: Frank Erwin Center

1991–92 Southwest Conference men's basketball standings
	Conf.				Overall
Team	W		L	PCT	W		L	PCT
Houston †	11	–	3	.786	25	–	6	.806
Texas	11	–	3	.786	23	–	12	.657
TCU	9	–	5	.643	23	–	11	.676
Rice	8	–	6	.571	20	–	11	.645
Texas Tech	6	–	8	.429	15	–	14	.517
Baylor	5	–	9	.357	13	–	15	.464
SMU	4	–	10	.286	10	–	18	.357
Texas A&M	2	–	12	.143	6	–	22	.214
† 1992 SWC tournament winner Rankings from AP poll

The 1991–92 Texas Longhorns men's basketball team represented The University of Texas at Austin in intercollegiate basketball competition during the 1991–92 season. The Longhorns were led by fourth-year head coach Tom Penders. The team finished the season with a 23–12 overall record and finished atop the standings in Southwest Conference play with a 11–3 conference record. Texas advanced to the NCAA tournament, falling to Iowa in the opening round.

== Roster ==
1991–92 Texas Longhorns men's basketball team
Players
Coaches

Pos.	#	Name	Height	Weight	Year	Hometown
G	3	Benford Williams	6 ft 5 in (1.96 m)	215 lb (98 kg)	Sr
G	10	B. J. Tyler	6 ft 1 in (1.85 m)	180 lb (82 kg)	So	Port Arthur, Texas
G	15	Terrence Rencher	6 ft 3 in (1.91 m)	175 lb (79 kg)	Fr	The Bronx, New York
F	30	Dexter Cambridge	6 ft 7 in (2.01 m)	220 lb (100 kg)	Jr	Nassau, Bahamas

Head coach

- Tom Penders (Connecticut)

Assistant coach(es)

Legend

- (C) Team captain
- (S) Suspended
- (I) Ineligible
- (W) Walk-on
- Injured
- Current redshirt

== Schedule and results ==
Date time, TV	Rank^{#}	Opponent^{#}	Result	Record	Site (attendance) city, state
Regular season
Nov 20, 1991*	No. 25	Washington; Preseason NIT	W 104–83	1–0	Frank Erwin Center; Austin, Texas
Nov 21, 1991*	No. 25	Princeton; Preseason NIT	W 57–46	2–0	Frank Erwin Center; Austin, Texas
Nov 27, 1991*	No. 23	vs. No. 18 Georgia Tech; Preseason NIT Semifinals	L 107–120	2–1	Madison Square Garden; New York, New York
Nov 29, 1991*	No. 23	vs. No. 21 Pittsburgh; Preseason NIT Consolation	L 87–91	2–2	Madison Square Garden; New York, New York
Dec 6, 1991*		North Texas	W 124–107	3–2	Frank Erwin Center; Austin, Texas
Dec 7, 1991*		San Diego State	W 85–58	4–2	Frank Erwin Center; Austin, Texas
Dec 10, 1991*		at No. 17 Oklahoma	L 91–106	4–3	Lloyd Noble Center; Norman, Oklahoma
Dec 14, 1991*		No. 8 Connecticut	L 77–94	4–4	Frank Erwin Center; Austin, Texas
Dec 22, 1991*		UC Santa Barbara	W 90–77	5–4	Frank Erwin Center; Austin, Texas
Dec 28, 1991*		vs. Clemson; Sun Bowl Carnival Semifinal	W 95–87	6–4	Special Events Center; El Paso, Texas
Dec 29, 1991*		at UTEP; Sun Bowl Carnival Championship	L 88–92	6–5	Special Events Center; El Paso, Texas
Jan 3, 1992*		vs. LSU	L 83–84	6–6	New Orleans, Louisiana
Jan 6, 1992*		Murray State	W 93–75	7–6	Frank Erwin Center; Austin, Texas
Jan 9, 1992		Houston	W 86–75	8–6 (1–0)	Frank Erwin Center; Austin, Texas
Jan 11, 1992		Texas Tech	W 88–83	9–6 (2–0)	Frank Erwin Center; Austin, Texas
Jan 14, 1992		at Texas A&M	W 76–73	10–6 (3–0)	G. Rollie White Coliseum; College Station, Texas
Jan 18, 1992		at TCU	L 76–80	10–7 (3–1)	Daniel-Meyer Coliseum; Fort Worth, Texas
Jan 22, 1992		SMU	W 106–91	11–7 (4–1)	Frank Erwin Center; Austin, Texas
Jan 27, 1992		at Baylor	L 68–84	11–8 (4–2)	Ferrell Center; Waco, Texas
Jan 30, 1992*		at VCU	W 105–94	12–8	Richmond Coliseum; Richmond, Virginia
Feb 1, 1992*		vs. Rhode Island	L 79–92	12–9	
Feb 5, 1992		Rice	W 88–87	13–9 (5–2)	Frank Erwin Center; Austin, Texas
Feb 9, 1992		at Houston	W 87–72	14–9 (6–2)	Hofheinz Pavilion; Houston, Texas
Feb 12, 1992		at Texas Tech	W 93–90	15–9 (7–2)	Lubbock Municipal Coliseum; Lubbock, Texas
Feb 16, 1992*		vs. Georgia	W 98–93	16–9	
Feb 19, 1992*		TCU	W 99–77	17–9 (8–2)	Frank Erwin Center; Austin, Texas
Feb 22, 1992		at SMU	W 88–86	18–9 (9–2)	Moody Coliseum; Dallas, Texas
Feb 26, 1992		Oral Roberts	W 128–108	19–9	Frank Erwin Center; Austin, Texas
Feb 29, 1992		Baylor	W 97–67	20–9 (10–2)	Frank Erwin Center; Austin, Texas
Mar 5, 1992		at Rice	L 97–103	20–10 (10–3)	Tudor Fieldhouse; Houston, Texas
Mar 8, 1992		Texas A&M	W 86–63	21–10 (11–3)	Frank Erwin Center; Austin, Texas
Southwest Conference tournament
Mar 13, 1992*		vs. Texas A&M; Quarterfinal	W 88–69	22–10	Reunion Arena; Dallas, Texas
Mar 14, 1992*		vs. Texas Tech; Semifinal	W 97–87	23–10	Reunion Arena; Dallas, Texas
Mar 15, 1992*		vs. Houston; Championship Game	L 72–91	23–11	Reunion Arena; Dallas, Texas
1992 NCAA Tournament – East No. 8 seed
Mar 19, 1992*	(8 E)	vs. (9 E) Iowa; First Round	L 92–98	23–12	Greensboro Coliseum; Greensboro, North Carolina
*Non-conference game. ^{#}Rankings from AP poll. (#) Tournament seedings in parentheses. E=East. All times are in Central Standard Time.
