= 1992 Southwest Conference men's basketball tournament =

- Classification: Division I
- Season: 1991–92
- Teams: 8
- Site: Reunion Arena; Dallas, Texas
- Champions: Houston (5th title)
- Winning coach: Pat Foster (1st title)
- MVP: Dexter Cambridge (Texas)

1991–92 Southwest Conference men's basketball standings
	Conf.				Overall
Team	W		L	PCT	W		L	PCT
Houston †	11	–	3	.786	25	–	6	.806
Texas	11	–	3	.786	23	–	12	.657
TCU	9	–	5	.643	23	–	11	.676
Rice	8	–	6	.571	20	–	11	.645
Texas Tech	6	–	8	.429	15	–	14	.517
Baylor	5	–	9	.357	13	–	15	.464
SMU	4	–	10	.286	10	–	18	.357
Texas A&M	2	–	12	.143	6	–	22	.214
† 1992 SWC tournament winner Rankings from AP poll

The 1992 Southwest Conference men's basketball tournament was held March 13–15, 1992, at Reunion Arena in Dallas, Texas.

Number 2 seed Houston defeated 1 seed Texas 91–72 to win their 5th championship and receive the conference's automatic bid to the 1992 NCAA tournament.

== Format and seeding ==
The tournament consisted of the top 8 teams playing in a single-elimination tournament.

Place	Seed	Team	Conference			Overall		
Place	Seed	Team	W	L	%	W	L	%
1	1	Texas	11	3	.786	23	12	.657
1	2	Houston	11	3	.786	25	6	.806
3	3	TCU	9	5	.643	23	11	.676
4	4	Rice	8	6	.571	20	11	.645
5	5	Texas Tech	6	8	.429	15	14	.517
6	6	Baylor	5	9	.357	13	15	.464
7	7	SMU	4	10	.286	10	18	.357
8	8	Texas A&M	2	12	.143	6	22	.214

== Tournament ==
Quarterfinals; Friday, March 13
1	Texas	88
8	Texas A&M	69
4	Rice	62
5	Texas Tech	65
3	TCU	62
6	Baylor	55
2	Houston	73
7	SMU	62

Semifinals; Saturday, March 14
1	Texas	97
5	Texas Tech	87
3	TCU	84
2	Houston	87 (2OT)

Finals; Sunday, March 15
1	Texas	72
2	Houston	91
