= 1998–99 Oklahoma State Cowboys basketball team =

American college basketball season

1998–99 Oklahoma State Cowboys basketball

NCAA tournament, second round
- Conference: Big 12 Conference
- Record: 23–11 (10–6 Big 12)
- Head coach: Eddie Sutton (9th season)
- Assistant coaches: Sean Sutton (6th season); Paul Graham (7th season)
- Home arena: Gallagher-Iba Arena (Capacity: 6,381)

1998–99 Big 12 men's basketball standings
	Conf.				Overall
Team	W		L	PCT	W		L	PCT
Texas	13	–	3	.813	19	–	13	.594
Missouri	11	–	5	.688	20	–	9	.690
No. 22 Kansas †	11	–	5	.688	23	–	10	.697
Oklahoma	11	–	5	.688	22	–	11	.667
Oklahoma State	10	–	6	.625	23	–	11	.676
Nebraska	10	–	6	.625	20	–	13	.606
Kansas State	7	–	9	.438	20	–	13	.606
Colorado	7	–	9	.438	18	–	15	.545
Iowa State	6	–	10	.375	15	–	15	.500
Texas A&M	5	–	11	.313	12	–	15	.444
Texas Tech	5	–	11	.313	13	–	17	.433
Baylor	0	–	16	.000	6	–	24	.200
† 1999 Big 12 Tournament winner Rankings from AP poll

The 1998–99 Oklahoma State Cowboys basketball team represented Oklahoma State University as a member of the Big 12 Conference during the 1998–99 NCAA Division I men's basketball season. They were led by 9th-year head coach Eddie Sutton and played their home games at Gallagher-Iba Arena in Stillwater, Oklahoma. They finished the season 23–11, 10–6 in Big 12 play to finish in a tie for fifth place. The Cowboys lost to Kansas in the championship game of the Big 12 tournament. The team received an at-large bid to the NCAA tournament as the No. 9 seed in the South region. Oklahoma State defeated No. 8 seed Syracuse in the opening round before losing to No. 1 seed Auburn in the second round.

== Roster ==
1998–99 Oklahoma State Cowboys men's basketball team
Players
Coaches

Pos.	#	Name	Height	Weight	Year	Previous school	Hometown
F	34	Desmond Mason	6 ft 5 in (1.96 m)	210 lb (95 kg)	Jr	Waxahachie	Waxahachie, Texas
G	44	Doug Gottlieb	6 ft 1 in (1.85 m)	—	Jr	Notre Dame	Milwaukee, Wisconsin

Head coach

- Eddie Sutton

Assistant coach(es)

- Sean Sutton
- Paul Graham

Legend

- (C) Team captain
- (S) Suspended
- (I) Ineligible
- (W) Walk-on
- Injured
- Current redshirt

== Schedule and results ==
Date time, TV	Rank^{#}	Opponent^{#}	Result	Record	Site city, state
Regular season
Nov 16, 1998*	No. 13	Northwestern State	W 90–65	1–0	Gallagher-Iba Arena; Stillwater, Oklahoma
Nov 19, 1998*	No. 13	vs. Marquette	W 57–54	2–0	Stan Sheriff Center; Honolulu, Hawaii
Nov 20, 1998*	No. 13	at Hawaii	W 58–37	3–0	Stan Sheriff Center; Honolulu, Hawaii
Nov 28, 1998*	No. 12	TCU	W 79–74	4–0	Gallagher-Iba Arena; Stillwater, Oklahoma
Dec 1, 1998*	No. 11	Florida Atlantic	L 81–83	4–1	Gallagher-Iba Arena; Stillwater, Oklahoma
Dec 5, 1998*	No. 11	vs. No. 18 UCLA; John Wooden Classic	L 66–69	4–2	Arrowhead Pond of Anaheim; Anaheim, California
Dec 12, 1998*	No. 19	Little Rock	W 88–41	5–2	Gallagher-Iba Arena; Stillwater, Oklahoma
Dec 15, 1998*	No. 18	Houston Baptist	W 114–62	6–2	Gallagher-Iba Arena; Stillwater, Oklahoma
Dec 20, 1998*	No. 18	at Creighton	L 60–66	6–3	Omaha Civic Auditorium; Omaha, Nebraska
Dec 22, 1998*	No. 25	at UNLV	W 81–69	7–3	Thomas & Mack Center; Paradise, Nevada
Dec 30, 1998*	No. 25	Southeast Missouri State	W 75–64	8–3	Gallagher-Iba Arena; Stillwater, Oklahoma
Jan 2, 1999	No. 25	Kansas State	W 75–69 ^{OT}	9–3 (1–0)	Gallagher-Iba Arena; Stillwater, Oklahoma
Jan 6, 1999	No. 23	at Texas A&M	W 64–59	10–3 (2–0)	Reed Arena; College Station, Texas
Jan 9, 1999	No. 23	at Baylor	W 76–63	11–3 (3–0)	Ferrell Center; Waco, Texas
Jan 12, 1999	No. 22	Oklahoma	L 43–54	11–4 (3–1)	Gallagher-Iba Arena; Stillwater, Oklahoma
Jan 17, 1999	No. 22	at Texas Tech	W 69–55	12–4 (4–1)	Lubbock Municipal Coliseum; Lubbock, Texas
Jan 20, 1999	No. 23	Baylor	W 75–47	13–4 (5–1)	Gallagher-Iba Arena; Stillwater, Oklahoma
Jan 23, 1999	No. 23	at Texas	L 70–73	13–5 (5–2)	Frank Erwin Center; Austin, Texas
Jan 27, 1999*		Southern Miss	W 65–64	14–5	Gallagher-Iba Arena; Stillwater, Oklahoma
Jan 30, 1999		Texas A&M	W 66–61	15–5 (6–2)	Gallagher-Iba Arena; Stillwater, Oklahoma
Feb 2, 1999		Iowa State	W 81–72	16–5 (7–2)	Gallagher-Iba Arena; Stillwater, Oklahoma
Feb 6, 1999		at Oklahoma	L 65–72	16–6 (7–3)	Lloyd Noble Center; Norman, Oklahoma
Feb 10, 1999		at Colorado	L 80–83	16–7 (7–4)	Coors Events Center; Boulder, Colorado
Feb 14, 1999		Texas	L 68–73	16–8 (7–5)	Gallagher-Iba Arena; Stillwater, Oklahoma
Feb 17, 1999		at Nebraska	W 60–48	17–8 (8–5)	Bob Devaney Sports Center; Lincoln, Nebraska
Feb 20, 1999		No. 22 Missouri	W 84–68	18–8 (9–5)	Gallagher-Iba Arena; Stillwater, Oklahoma
Feb 22, 1999		at Kansas	L 66–67 ^{OT}	18-9 (9–6)	Allen Fieldhouse; Lawrence, Kansas
Feb 27, 1999		Texas Tech	W 93–67	19–9 (10–6)	Gallagher-Iba Arena; Stillwater, Oklahoma
Big 12 tournament
Mar 4, 1999*	(5)	vs. (12) Baylor; First Round	W 83–57	20–9	Kemper Arena; Kansas City, Missouri
Mar 5, 1999*	(5)	vs. (4) Oklahoma; Quarterfinals	W 60–57	21–9	Kemper Arena; Kansas City, Missouri
Mar 6, 1999*	(5)	vs. (1) Texas; Semifinals	W 59–57	22–9	Kemper Arena; Kansas City, Missouri
Mar 7, 1999*	(5)	vs. (3) Kansas; Championship	L 37–53	22–10	Kemper Arena; Kansas City, Missouri
NCAA tournament
Mar 11, 1999*	(9 S)	vs. (8 S) Syracuse; First Round	W 69–61	23–10	RCA Dome; Indianapolis, Indiana
Mar 13, 1999*	(9 S)	vs. (1 S) No. 4 Auburn; Second Round	L 74–81	23–11	RCA Dome; Indianapolis, Indiana
*Non-conference game. ^{#}Rankings from AP poll. (#) Tournament seedings in parentheses. S=South.
