= 1998–99 Oklahoma Sooners men's basketball team =

American college basketball season

1998–99 Oklahoma Sooners men's basketball

NCAA tournament, Sweet Sixteen
- Conference: Big 12 Conference

Ranking
- Coaches: No. 19
- Record: 22-11 (11-5 Big 12)
- Head coach: Kelvin Sampson (5th season)
- Home arena: Lloyd Noble Center (Capacity: 10,871)

1998–99 Big 12 men's basketball standings
	Conf.				Overall
Team	W		L	PCT	W		L	PCT
Texas	13	–	3	.813	19	–	13	.594
Missouri	11	–	5	.688	20	–	9	.690
No. 22 Kansas †	11	–	5	.688	23	–	10	.697
Oklahoma	11	–	5	.688	22	–	11	.667
Oklahoma State	10	–	6	.625	23	–	11	.676
Nebraska	10	–	6	.625	20	–	13	.606
Kansas State	7	–	9	.438	20	–	13	.606
Colorado	7	–	9	.438	18	–	15	.545
Iowa State	6	–	10	.375	15	–	15	.500
Texas A&M	5	–	11	.313	12	–	15	.444
Texas Tech	5	–	11	.313	13	–	17	.433
Baylor	0	–	16	.000	6	–	24	.200
† 1999 Big 12 Tournament winner Rankings from AP poll

The 1998–99 Oklahoma Sooners men's basketball team represented the University of Oklahoma in competitive college basketball during the 1998–99 NCAA Division I men's basketball season. The Oklahoma Sooners men's basketball team played its home games in the Lloyd Noble Center and was a member of the National Collegiate Athletic Association's Big 12 Conference.

The team posted a 22–11 overall record (11–6 Big 12). The Sooners received a bid to the 1999 NCAA tournament as No. 13 seed in the Midwest region, and made a surprise run to the Sweet Sixteen before losing to No. 1 seed Michigan State, 54–46.

== Roster ==
1998–99 Oklahoma Sooners men's basketball team
Players
Coaches

Pos.	#	Name	Height	Weight	Year	Hometown
G	21	Eduardo Nájera	6 ft 8 in (2.03 m)	240 lb (109 kg)	Jr
G	24	Ryan Humphrey	6 ft 8 in (2.03 m)	230 lb (104 kg)	So	Booker T. Washington	Tulsa, Oklahoma

Head coach

- Kelvin Sampson

Assistant coach(es)

Legend

- (C) Team captain
- (S) Suspended
- (I) Ineligible
- (W) Walk-on
- Injured
- Current redshirt

Roster

== Schedule and results ==
Date time, TV	Rank^{#}	Opponent^{#}	Result	Record	Site (attendance) city, state
Non-conference regular season
Nov 14, 1998*		Northwestern State	W 75–55	1–0	Lloyd Noble Center; Norman, Oklahoma
Nov 21, 1998*		Coppin State	W 68–42	2–0	Lloyd Noble Center; Norman, Oklahoma
Nov 27, 1998*		Western Carolina	W 102–51	3–0	Lloyd Noble Center; Norman, Oklahoma
Nov 28, 1998*		Murray State	L 64–68	3–1	Lloyd Noble Center; Norman, Oklahoma
Dec 5, 1998*		No. 19 Arkansas	W 87–57	4–1	Lloyd Noble Center; Norman, Oklahoma
Dec 12, 1998*		Nicholls State	W 64–44	5–1	Lloyd Noble Center; Norman, Oklahoma
Dec 17, 1998*	No. 24	Sam Houston State	W 75–44	6–1	Lloyd Noble Center; Norman, Oklahoma
Dec 21, 1998	No. 23	at American-Puerto Rico	W 2–0	7–1	Caguas Municipal Complex; San Juan, Puerto Rico
Dec 22, 1998*	No. 23	vs. Ole Miss	L 72–75	7–2	Caguas Municipal Complex; San Juan, Puerto Rico
Dec 23, 1998*	No. 23	vs. NC State	L 58–62	7–3	Caguas Municipal Complex; San Juan, Puerto Rico
Dec 29, 1998*		vs. Western Kentucky; All-College Tournament	W 72–62 ^{OT}	8–3	Myriad Convention Center; Oklahoma City, Oklahoma
Dec 30, 1998*		vs. Oral Roberts; All-College Tournament	W 85–69	9–3	Myriad Convention Center; Oklahoma City, Oklahoma
Big 12 Regular Season
Jan 3, 1999		at Iowa State	W 56–52	10–3 (1–0)	Hilton Coliseum; Ames, Iowa
Jan 20, 1999	No. 25	Nebraska	L 81–96	13–5 (4–1)	Lloyd Noble Center; Norman, Oklahoma
Feb 27, 1999		Baylor	W 87–63	20–9 (11–5)	Lloyd Noble Center; Norman, Oklahoma
Big 12 Tournament
Mar 5, 1999*	(4)	vs. (5) Oklahoma State; Quarterfinals	L 57–60	20–10	Kemper Arena; Kansas City, Missouri
NCAA Tournament
Mar 12, 1999*	(13 MW)	vs. (4 MW) No. 12 Arizona; First Round	W 61–60	21–10	Bradley Center; Milwaukee, Wisconsin
Mar 14, 1999*	(13 MW)	vs. (5 MW) No. 24 UNC Charlotte; Second Round	W 85–72	22–10	Bradley Center; Milwaukee, Wisconsin
Mar 19, 1999*	(13 MW)	vs. (1 MW) No. 2 Michigan State; Sweet Sixteen	L 46–54	22–11	Edward Jones Dome; St. Louis, Missouri
*Non-conference game. ^{#}Rankings from AP Poll. (#) Tournament seedings in parentheses. All times are in Central Time. (#) during NCAA Tournament is seed within region W=West.
