= 1991–92 SMU Mustangs men's basketball team =

American college basketball season

1991–92 SMU Mustangs men's basketball
- Conference: Southwest Conference
- Record: 10–18 (4–10 SWC)
- Head coach: John Shumate (4th season)
- Home arena: Moody Coliseum

1991–92 Southwest Conference men's basketball standings
| | Conf. | | | | Overall |
| Team | W | | L | PCT | W | | L | PCT |
|---|---|---|---|---|---|---|---|---|
| Houston † | 11 | – | 3 | .786 | 25 | – | 6 | .806 |
| Texas | 11 | – | 3 | .786 | 23 | – | 12 | .657 |
| TCU | 9 | – | 5 | .643 | 23 | – | 11 | .676 |
| Rice | 8 | – | 6 | .571 | 20 | – | 11 | .645 |
| Texas Tech | 6 | – | 8 | .429 | 15 | – | 14 | .517 |
| Baylor | 5 | – | 9 | .357 | 13 | – | 15 | .464 |
| SMU | 4 | – | 10 | .286 | 10 | – | 18 | .357 |
| Texas A&M | 2 | – | 12 | .143 | 6 | – | 22 | .214 |
† 1992 SWC tournament winner Rankings from AP poll

The 1991–92 SMU Mustangs men's basketball team represented Southern Methodist University during the 1991–92 men's college basketball season.

== Schedule ==
| Date time, TV | Rank^{#} | Opponent^{#} | Result | Record | Site city, state |
|---|---|---|---|---|---|
| November 22* | | at Texas Southern | W 63–59 | 1–0 | Strahan Coliseum |
| November 25* | | at San Diego | L 68–75 | 1–1 | USD Sports Center; San Diego, California |
| November 30* | | Vanderbilt | L 55–67 | 1–2 | Moody Coliseum; University Park, Texas |
| December 3* | | at Wisconsin | W 66–64 | 2–2 | Wisconsin Field House; Madison, Wisconsin |
| December 7* | | Tulane | L 56–65 | 2–3 | Moody Coliseum; University Park, Texas |
| December 17* | | William & Mary | W 66–55 | 3–3 | Moody Coliseum; University Park, Texas |
| December 20* | | at Miami | W 69–60 | 4–3 | Miami Arena; Miami, Florida |
| December 28* | | Townson | W 85–66 | 5–3 | Moody Coliseum; University Park, Texas |
| December 30* | | at Texas-San Antonio | L 60–80 | 5–4 | Convocation Center |
| January 4* | | No. 4 Kansas | L 67–79 | 5–5 | Moody Coliseum; University Park, Texas |
| January 8 | | at Texas Tech | L 69–80 | 5–6 (0–1) | Lubbock Municipal Coliseum; Lubbock, Texas |
| January 11 | | at Texas A&M | W 73–69 | 6–6 (1–1) | G. Rollie White Coliseum |
| January 15 | | TCU | L 62–73 | 6–7 (1–2) | Moody Coliseum; University Park, Texas |
| January 18* | | at Oral Roberts | W 92–80 | 7–7 (1–2) | Mabee Center; Tulsa, OK |
| January 22 | | at Texas | L 91–106 | 7–8 (1–3) | Frank Erwin Center; Austin, Texas |
| January 25 | | Baylor | W 74–72 | 8–8 (2–3) | Moody Coliseum; University Park, Texas |
| January 28* | | No. 3 Oklahoma State | L 53–64 | 8–9 (2–3) | Moody Coliseum; University Park, Texas |
| February 1 | | at Rice | L 56–66 | 8–10 (2–4) | Tudor Fieldhouse; Houston, Texas |
| February 5 | | at Houston | L 50–67 | 8–11 (2–5) | Hofheinz Pavilion; Houston, Texas |
| February 8 | | Texas Tech | W 51–47 | 9–11 (3–5) | Moody Coliseum; University Park, Texas |
| February 11 | | Texas A&M | W 44–38 | 10–11 (4–5) | Moody Coliseum; University Park, Texas |
| February 15 | | at TCU | L 59–70 | 10–12 (4–6) | Daniel-Meyer Coliseum; Fort Worth, Texas |
| February 17* | | at Stetson | L 63–83 | 10–13 (4–7) | Edmunds Center |
| February 22 | | Texas | L 86–88 | 10–14 (4–8) | Moody Coliseum; University Park, Texas |
| February 26 | | at Baylor | L 62–79 | 10–15 (4–9) | Ferrell Center |
| March 1 | | Rice | L 53–58 | 10–16 (4–10) | Moody Coliseum; University Park, Texas |
| March 7 | | Houston | L 62–69 | 10–17 (4–11) | Moody Coliseum; University Park, Texas |
Southwest tournament
| March 13 | | vs. Houston | L 62–73 | 10–18 (4–11) | Reunion Arena; Dallas, Texas |
*Non-conference game. ^{#}Rankings from AP Poll. (#) Tournament seedings in parentheses. All times are in Central Time.
