= 1998–99 Missouri Tigers men's basketball team =

American college basketball season

1998–99 Missouri Tigers men's basketball

NCAA tournament, First round
- Conference: Big 12 Conference
- Record: 20–9 (11–5 Big 12)
- Head coach: Norm Stewart (32nd season)
- Assistant coaches: Kim Anderson (11th season); Rich Daly (16th season)
- Captains: John Woods; Monte Hardge
- Home arena: Hearnes Center

1998–99 Big 12 men's basketball standings
	Conf.				Overall
Team	W		L	PCT	W		L	PCT
Texas	13	–	3	.813	19	–	13	.594
Missouri	11	–	5	.688	20	–	9	.690
No. 22 Kansas †	11	–	5	.688	23	–	10	.697
Oklahoma	11	–	5	.688	22	–	11	.667
Oklahoma State	10	–	6	.625	23	–	11	.676
Nebraska	10	–	6	.625	20	–	13	.606
Kansas State	7	–	9	.438	20	–	13	.606
Colorado	7	–	9	.438	18	–	15	.545
Iowa State	6	–	10	.375	15	–	15	.500
Texas A&M	5	–	11	.313	12	–	15	.444
Texas Tech	5	–	11	.313	13	–	17	.433
Baylor	0	–	16	.000	6	–	24	.200
† 1999 Big 12 Tournament winner Rankings from AP poll

The 1998–99 Missouri Tigers men's basketball team represented the University of Missouri during the 1998–99 NCAA men's college basketball season. The Tigers were led by legendary coach Norm Stewart in his 32nd and final season at the school.

== Roster ==
1998–99 Missouri Tigers men's basketball team
Players
Coaches

Pos.	#	Name	Height	Weight	Year	Hometown
F	3	Kenge Stevenson	6 ft 5 in (1.96 m)	230 lb (104 kg)	Fr
G	4	Clarence Gilbert	6 ft 2 in (1.88 m)	194 lb (88 kg)	Fr
G	5	Keyon Dooling	6 ft 3 in (1.91 m)	196 lb (89 kg)	Fr
F	11	Mark Wampler	6 ft 5 in (1.96 m)	—	Jr
G	12	Brian Grawer	6 ft 0 in (1.83 m)	—	So
F	24	Jeff Hafer	6 ft 5 in (1.96 m)	—	Jr
F	31	Johnnie Parker	6 ft 6 in (1.98 m)	—	So
G	32	John Woods (C)	6 ft 3 in (1.91 m)	—	Sr
C	33	Tajudeen Soyoye	—	—	So
F	44	Albert White Jr.	6 ft 5 in (1.96 m)	—	Jr
F	52	Matt Rowan	6 ft 7 in (2.01 m)	—	Fr
C	53	Monte Hardge (C)	6 ft 11 in (2.11 m)	—	Sr
C	54	Pat Schumacher	—	—	Fr
G		Steve Weaver	—	—	So

Head coach

- Norm Stewart (Missouri)

Assistant coach(es)

- Kim Anderson (Missouri)
- Rich Daly

Legend

- (C) Team captain
- (S) Suspended
- (I) Ineligible
- (W) Walk-on
- Injured
- Current redshirt

Roster

== Schedule ==
Date time, TV	Rank^{#}	Opponent^{#}	Result	Record	Site city, state
Regular Season
Nov 13, 1998*		Jackson State	W 87–46	1–0	Hearnes Center; Columbia, Missouri
Nov 18, 1998*		SW Missouri State; Preseason NIT	L 69–72	1–1	Hearnes Center (5,176); Columbia, Missouri
Nov 23, 1998*		Austin Peay	W 63–53	2–1	Hearnes Center; Columbia, Missouri
Nov 29, 1998*		Texas State	W 69–51	3–1	Hearnes Center; Columbia, Missouri
Dec 1, 1998*		Nicholls State	W 66–57	4–1	Hearnes Center; Columbia, Missouri
Dec 5, 1998*		Idaho	W 68–60	5–1	Hearnes Center; Columbia, Missouri
Dec 9, 1998*		Arkansas-Pine Bluff	W 89–33	6–1	Hearnes Center; Columbia, Missouri
Dec 12, 1998*		at SMU	W 66–55	7–1	Moody Coliseum; Dallas, Texas
Dec 19, 1998*		at No. 25 Iowa	L 68–82	7–2	Carver-Hawkeye Arena; Iowa City, Iowa
Dec 22, 1998*		vs. Illinois; Braggin' Rights	W 67–62	8–2	Kiel Center; St. Louis, Missouri
Dec 30, 1998*		Centenary	W 77–48	9–2	Hearnes Center; Columbia, Missouri
Jan 2, 1999		Nebraska	W 80–57	10–2 (1–0)	Hearnes Center; Columbia, Missouri
Jan 6, 1999		at Kansas State	W 78–73	11–2 (2–0)	Bramlage Coliseum; Manhattan, Kansas
Jan 9, 1999		at Texas A&M	W 96–91	12–2 (3–0)	Reed Arena; College Station, Texas
Jan 11, 1999		No. 18 Kansas; Border War	L 61–73	12–3 (3–1)	Hearnes Center; Columbia, Missouri
Jan 16, 1999		at Colorado	L 63–82	12–4 (3–2)	Coors Events Conference Center; Boulder, Colorado
Jan 24, 1999		at No. 19 Kansas; Border War	W 71–63	13–4 (4–2)	Allen Fieldhouse; Lawrence, Kansas
Jan 27, 1999		Kansas State	W 70–63	14–4 (5–2)	Hearnes Center; Columbia, Missouri
Jan 30, 1999		Baylor	W 73–55	15–4 (6–2)	Hearnes Center; Columbia, Missouri
Feb 3, 1999	No. 24	Texas Tech	W 88–63	16–4 (7–2)	Hearnes Center; Columbia, Missouri
Feb 6, 1999	No. 24	at Nebraska	L 61–69	16–5 (7–3)	Bob Devaney Sports Center; Lincoln, Nebraska
Feb 8, 1999	No. 24	at Iowa State	W 77–61	17–5 (8–3)	Hilton Coliseum; Ames, Iowa
Feb 13, 1999		Colorado	W 87–56	18–5 (9–3)	Hearnes Center; Columbia, Missouri
Feb 15, 1999		Oklahoma	L 57–69	18–6 (9–4)	Hearnes Center; Columbia, Missouri
Feb 20, 1999	No. 22	at Oklahoma State	L 68–84	18–7 (9–5)	Gallagher-Iba Arena; Stillwater, Oklahoma
Feb 24, 1999		Iowa State	W 75–64	19–7 (10–5)	Hearnes Center; Columbia, Missouri
Feb 27, 1999		at No. 22 Texas	W 54–47	20–7 (11–5)	Frank Erwin Center; Austin, Texas
Big 12 Tournament
Mar 5, 1999*	(2) No. 24	vs. (7) Kansas State; First round	L 74–84	20–8	Kemper Arena (18,900); Kansas City, Missouri
NCAA Tournament
Mar 11, 1999*	(8 W)	vs. (9 W) No. 25 New Mexico; First round	L 59–61	20–9	McNichols Sports Arena; Denver, Colorado
*Non-conference game. ^{#}Rankings from AP Poll. (#) Tournament seedings in parentheses. W=West.
