= 1998–99 Iowa State Cyclones men's basketball team =

American college basketball season

1998–99 Iowa State Cyclones men's basketball
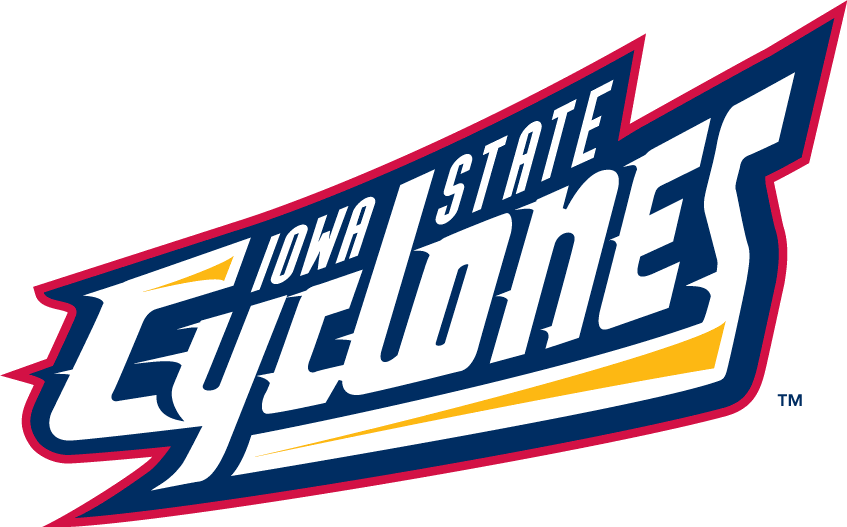
- Conference: Big 12 Conference
- Record: 15-15 (6-10 Big 12)
- Head coach: Larry Eustachy (1st season)
- Assistant coaches: Steve Barnes; Terry Carroll; Leonard Perry
- Home arena: Hilton Coliseum

1998–99 Big 12 men's basketball standings
	Conf.				Overall
Team	W		L	PCT	W		L	PCT
Texas	13	–	3	.813	19	–	13	.594
Missouri	11	–	5	.688	20	–	9	.690
No. 22 Kansas †	11	–	5	.688	23	–	10	.697
Oklahoma	11	–	5	.688	22	–	11	.667
Oklahoma State	10	–	6	.625	23	–	11	.676
Nebraska	10	–	6	.625	20	–	13	.606
Kansas State	7	–	9	.438	20	–	13	.606
Colorado	7	–	9	.438	18	–	15	.545
Iowa State	6	–	10	.375	15	–	15	.500
Texas A&M	5	–	11	.313	12	–	15	.444
Texas Tech	5	–	11	.313	13	–	17	.433
Baylor	0	–	16	.000	6	–	24	.200
† 1999 Big 12 Tournament winner Rankings from AP poll

The 1998–99 Iowa State Cyclones men's basketball team represented Iowa State University during the 1998–99 NCAA Division I men's basketball season. The Cyclones were coached by Larry Eustachy, who was in his 1st season. They played their home games at Hilton Coliseum in Ames, Iowa, and competed in the Big 12 Conference.

At the conclusion of the season, head coach Tim Floyd accepted the same position with the Chicago Bulls of the NBA. Iowa State hired Utah State head coach Larry Eustachy to replace him.

They finished the season 15–15, 6–10 in Big 12 play to finish in 9th place. They lost to Colorado in the first round of the Big 12 Conference tournament.

== Previous season ==
They finished the season 12–18, 5–11 in Big 12 play to finish in 11th place. They lost to Missouri in the first round of the Big 12 Conference tournament.

The Cyclones saw individual success with Marcus Fizer being named a Freshman All-American by Basketball Times, Big 12 Freshman of the Year, and Big 12 Freshman of the Week four times.

After several seasons of courting, the Chicago Bulls of the NBA hired Iowa State's Tim Floyd to replace Phil Jackson as head coach. Iowa State hired Utah State Head Coach Larry Eustachy to replace him.

=== Offseason departures ===
Despite transferring into the program as sharp-shooters from junior colleges the previous year, both Delvin Washington and Jerry Curry transferred out after a single season, citing lack of playing time from poor shooting.

After only playing four games during the 1997–98 season Lamont Sides transferred to Allegany College in Maryland.

Even though Andy Stensrud originally came to Iowa State on a basketball team, he left the team after the 1997–98 season to join the football team. After four years of football he would go on to play in the NFL.

Offseason departures
Name	Position	Reason
Matt Knoll	Guard	Graduated
Brad Johnson	Guard	Graduated
Walter Moore	Forward	Transferred to IUPUI
Jason Teeter	Guard	Left the basketball team
Lamont Sides	Guard	Transferred to Allegany College
Delvin Washington	Guard	Transferred to Chipola College
Chris Riddens	Guard	Transferred out of the program
Jerry Curry	Guard	Transferred to Northwestern Oklahoma State
Andy Stensrud	Forward	Left the basketball team to join the Iowa State football team

== Preseason ==
Paul Shirley had a stress fracture in the off season and had to sit out the 1998–99 season with a red-shirt.

Iowa State signed West Virginia Wesleyan transfer Dewayne Johns in the off season. He struggled with the adjustment to student-athlete life and was kicked off the team during exhibition play.

Kantrail Horton transferred into the program mid-season from Middle Georgia JC, but coach Eustacy elected to have him red-shirt to preserve his full two years of eligibility.

=== Preseason poll ===
Preseason poll
Finish	School	Points
1	Oklahoma State (7)	117
2	Kansas (5)	115
3	Missouri	91
4	Oklahoma	90
5	Texas	74
6	Kansas State	72
7	Nebraska	69
8	Iowa State	45
9	Texas Tech	42
10	Colorado	38
11	Baylor	17
12	Texas A&M	17

=== Incoming players ===
Incoming players
Name	Position	Height	Weight	Previous school	Hometown
Rodney Hampton	Guard	6'2"	190 lbs.	Lakeland CC	Oak Park, Michigan
Michael Nurse	Guard	6'1"	175 lbs.	Monroe College	Teaneck, New Jersey
Anthony Lloyd	Guard	6'3"	190 lbs.	Perris Union High	Perris, California
Kantrail Horton	Guard	6'1"	225 lbs.	Middle Georgia JC	Covington, GA
Lamar Gregg	Guard	6'3"	190 lbs.	Okaloosa-Walton CC	Richmond, Virginia
Dewayne Johns	Center	7'1"	280 lbs.	West Virginia Wesleyan	Kokomo, Indiana

== Roster ==
1998–99 Iowa State Cyclones men's basketball team
Players
Coaches

Pos.	#	Name	Height	Weight	Year	Previous school	Hometown
G	4	Travis Spivey (redshirt)	6 ft 3 in (1.91 m)	190 lb (86 kg)	RS So	Georgia Tech	Myrtle Beach, South Carolina
G	4	Kantrail Horton (redshirt)	6 ft 1 in (1.85 m)	225 lb (102 kg)	RS So	Middle Georgia JC	Covington, GA
F	5	Marcus Fizer	6 ft 8 in (2.03 m)	240 lb (109 kg)	So	Arcadia High	Arcadia, Louisiana
G	10	Lee Love	6 ft 1 in (1.85 m)	170 lb (77 kg)	So	St. Augustine High	New Orleans
G	11	Anthony Lloyd	6 ft 3 in (1.91 m)	190 lb (86 kg)	Fr	Perris Union High	Perris, California
F	51	Martin Rancik	6 ft 8 in (2.03 m)	230 lb (104 kg)	So	Saint Louis Park	Nitra, SK
G	21	Paris Corner (S)	6 ft 1 in (1.85 m)	185 lb (84 kg)	So	West Brook High	Beaumont, Texas
F	23	Stevie Johnson	6 ft 4 in (1.93 m)	225 lb (102 kg)	Jr	Perry Central	Beaumont, Mississippi
G	24	Rodney Hampton	6 ft 2 in (1.88 m)	190 lb (86 kg)	Jr	Lakeland CC	Oak Park, Michigan
G	25	Lamar Gregg	6 ft 3 in (1.91 m)	190 lb (86 kg)	Jr	Okaloosa-Walton CC	Richmond, Virginia
F	40	Klay Edwards (C)	6 ft 9 in (2.06 m)	225 lb (102 kg)	RS Sr	Winfield-Mt. Union	Morning Sun, Iowa
F	45	Paul Shirley (redshirt)	6 ft 9 in (2.06 m)	230 lb (104 kg)	RS So	Jefferson West	Meriden, Kansas
G	53	Michael Nurse	6 ft 1 in (1.85 m)	175 lb (79 kg)	Jr	Monroe College	Teaneck, New Jersey
C	55	Tony Rampton	7 ft 0 in (2.13 m)	230 lb (104 kg)	Sr	Waseca High	New Plymouth, NZ

Head coach

- Larry Eustachy (Long Beach State)

Assistant coach(es)

- Terry Carroll (Northern Iowa)
- Leonard Perry (Idaho)
- Randy Brown (Iowa)

Legend

- (C) Team captain
- (S) Suspended
- (I) Ineligible
- (W) Walk-on
- Injured
- Current redshirt

== Schedule and results ==
Date time, TV	Rank^{#}	Opponent^{#}	Result	Record	Site city, state
Exhibition
November 12, 1998*; 7:00 pm		Estonia National Select; Exhibition	W 69-61		Hilton Coliseum; Ames, Iowa
November 15, 1998*; 3:00 pm		World Basketball Opportunities; Exhibition	W 81-62		Hilton Coliseum; Ames, Iowa
Regular season
November 23, 1998*; 7:00 pm		Chicago State	W 79-48	1-0	Hilton Coliseum; Ames, Iowa
November 25, 1998*; 11:00 pm		vs. Saint Mary's; Carrs Great Alaska Shootout	W 74-72 ^{OT}	2-0	Sullivan Arena; Anchorage, AK
November 27, 1998*; 8:15 pm, ESPN		vs. No. 15 Cincinnati; Carrs Great Alaska Shootout	L 52-60	2-1	Sullivan Arena; Anchorage, AK
November 28, 1998*; 8:00 pm		vs. Fresno State; Carrs Great Alaska Shootout	W 79-70	3-1	Sullivan Arena; Anchorage, AK
December 2, 1998*; 7:05 pm		at Northern Iowa; Big Four Classic	L 57-61	3-2	UNI-Dome; Cedar Falls, Iowa
December 4, 1998*; 8:00 pm, Cyclone Television Network		North Texas; Cyclone Challenge	W 72-45	4-2	Hilton Coliseum; Ames, Iowa
December 5, 1998*; 8:00 pm, Cyclone Television Network		Western Illinois; Cyclone Challenge	W 80-73 ^{OT}	5-2	Hilton Coliseum; Ames, Iowa
December 8, 1998*; 7:00 pm, Cyclone Television Network		Drake; Big Four Classic	W 57-56	6-2	Hilton Coliseum; Ames, Iowa
December 12, 1998*; 1:05 pm, HTN		at Iowa	L 54-74	6-3	Carver–Hawkeye Arena; Iowa City, Iowa
December 29, 1998*; 8:30 pm, ESPN2		vs. No. 8 Arizona; Las Vegas Shootout	L 71-75	6-4	Thomas & Mack Center; Las Vegas
December 22, 1998*; 8:00 pm, Cyclone Television Network		New Orleans; The Tribune Holiday Classic	W 61-51	7-4	Hilton Coliseum; Ames, Iowa
December 23, 1998*; 8:00 pm, Cyclone Television Network		Rice; The Tribune Holiday Classic	W 50-45	8-4	Hilton Coliseum; Ames, Iowa
December 29, 1998*; 7:00 pm, Cyclone Television Network		Southern-New Orleans	W 112-43	9-4	Hilton Coliseum; Ames, Iowa
January 3, 1999; 3:00 pm, Big 12		Oklahoma	L 52-56	9-5 (0-1)	Hilton Coliseum; Ames, Iowa
January 6, 1999; 7:00 pm, Cyclone Television Network		at Texas	L 45-71	9-6 (0-2)	Frank Erwin Center; Austin, Texas
January 9, 1999; 8:00 pm, Big 12		at No. 18 Kansas	L 60-74	9-7 (0-3)	Allen Fieldhouse; Lawrence, Kansas
January 13, 1999; 7:00 pm, Cyclone Television Network		Colorado	W 60-51	10-7 (1-3)	Hilton Coliseum; Ames, Iowa
January 16, 1999; 7:00 pm, Cyclone Television Network		at Texas A&M	W 64-43	11-7 (2-3)	Reed Arena; College Station, Texas
January 23, 1999; 3:00 pm, Big 12		Texas Tech	W 70-62	12-7 (3-3)	Hilton Coliseum; Ames, Iowa
January 27, 1999; 8:00 pm CT, Cyclone Television Network		at Colorado	L 44-64	12-8 (3-4)	Coors Events Center; Boulder, Colorado
January 30, 1999; 7:00 pm, Cyclone Television Network		Nebraska	W 52-47	13-8 (4-4)	Hilton Coliseum; Ames, Iowa
February 2, 1999; 8:00 pm, Big 12		at Oklahoma State	L 72-81	13-9 (4-5)	Gallagher-Iba Arena; Stillwater, Oklahoma
February 6, 1999; 12:45 pm, Big 12		Kansas State	L 62-67	13-10 (4-6)	Hilton Coliseum; Ames, Iowa
February 8, 1999; 8:30 pm, ESPN		No. 24 Missouri	L 71-77	13-11 (4-7)	Hilton Coliseum; Ames, Iowa
February 13, 1999; 8:30 pm, ESPN		at Nebraska	W 52-47	13-12 (4-8)	Bob Devaney Center; Lincoln, Nebraska
February 16, 1999; 7:00 pm, Cyclone Television Network		Baylor	W 64-42	14-12 (5-8)	Hilton Coliseum; Ames, Iowa
February 20, 1999; 3:00 pm, Big 12		at Kansas State	L 58-64 ^{OT}	14-13 (5-9)	Bramlage Coliseum; Manhattan, Kansas
February 24, 1999; 7:00 pm, Cyclone Television Network		at Missouri	L 64-75	14-14 (5-10)	Hearnes Center; Columbia, Missouri
February 28, 1999; 1:00 pm, CBS		Kansas	W 52-50	15-14 (6-10)	Hilton Coliseum; Ames, Iowa
Big 12 Tournament
March 4, 1998; 12:00 pm, Big 12		vs. Colorado; First round	L 61-69	15-15 (6-10)	Kemper Arena; Kansas City, Missouri
*Non-conference game. ^{#}Rankings from AP poll. (#) Tournament seedings in parentheses. All times are in Central Time.

== Awards and honors ==
- All-Big 12 Selections

Marcus Fizer (Second team)

- Academic All-Big 12

Klay Edwards (First team)
Lamar Gregg (Second team)

- Big-12 Player of the Week

Marcus Fizer (December 2nd)
Marcus Fizer (February 8th)

- Ralph A. Olsen Award

Marcus Fizer
