= 1998–99 Kansas Jayhawks men's basketball team =

American college basketball season

1998–99 Kansas Jayhawks men's basketball

Big 12 tournament champions

NCAA men's Division I tournament, Round of 32
- Conference: Big 12 Conference
- North

Ranking
- Coaches: No. 23
- AP: No. 22
- Record: 23–10 (11–5 Big 12)
- Head coach: Roy Williams (11th season)
- Assistant coaches: Matt Doherty (7th season); Neil Dougherty (4th season); Joe Holladay (5th season)
- Captains: Jelani Janisse; Chris Martin; T.J. Pugh; Ryan Robertson
- Home arena: Allen Fieldhouse

1998–99 Big 12 men's basketball standings
	Conf.				Overall
Team	W		L	PCT	W		L	PCT
Texas	13	–	3	.813	19	–	13	.594
Missouri	11	–	5	.688	20	–	9	.690
No. 22 Kansas †	11	–	5	.688	23	–	10	.697
Oklahoma	11	–	5	.688	22	–	11	.667
Oklahoma State	10	–	6	.625	23	–	11	.676
Nebraska	10	–	6	.625	20	–	13	.606
Kansas State	7	–	9	.438	20	–	13	.606
Colorado	7	–	9	.438	18	–	15	.545
Iowa State	6	–	10	.375	15	–	15	.500
Texas A&M	5	–	11	.313	12	–	15	.444
Texas Tech	5	–	11	.313	13	–	17	.433
Baylor	0	–	16	.000	6	–	24	.200
† 1999 Big 12 Tournament winner Rankings from AP poll

The 1998–99 Kansas Jayhawks men's basketball team represented the University of Kansas in the 1998–99 NCAA Division I men's basketball season, which was the Jayhawks' 101st basketball season. The head coach was Roy Williams, who served his 11th year at KU. The team played its home games in Allen Fieldhouse in Lawrence, Kansas.

== Roster ==
Name	#	Position	Height	Weight	Year	Home town
Luke Axtell	33	Guard/forward	6–10	220	Sophomore (RS)	Austin, Texas
Jeff Boschee	13	Guard	6–1	185	Freshman	Valley City, North Dakota
Nick Bradford	21	Forward	6-6	190	Junior	Fayetteville, Arkansas
Jeff Carey	22	Forward/center	6–10	230	Freshman	Camdenton, Missouri
Eric Chenowith	44	Center	7–0	235	Sophomore	Orange, California
John Crider	12	Guard	6–3	180	Freshman	Horton, Kansas
Lester Earl	3	Forward	6–8	235	Junior	Baton Rouge, Louisiana
Kenny Gregory	20	Guard/forward	6–5	215	Sophomore	Columbus, Ohio
Jelani Janisse	23	Guard	6–3	210	Senior	Los Angeles, California
Ashante Johnson	31	Forward	6–8	210	Junior	San Diego, California
Marlon London	24	Guard	6–3	180	Freshman	Broadview, Illinois
Chris Martin	30	Guard	6–2	190	Senior	Overland Park, Kansas
Terry Nooner	5	Guard	6–0	170	Senior	Raytown, Missouri
T.J. Pugh	32	Forward	6–8	240	Senior	Omaha, Nebraska
Ryan Robertson	4	Guard	6–5	190	Senior	Saint Charles, Missouri

== Big 12 Conference standings ==
#	Team	Conference	Pct.	Overall	Pct.
1	Texas	13-3	.813	19-13	.594
2	Missouri	11-5	.688	20–9	.690
3	Kansas	11-5	.688	23-10	.697
4	Oklahoma	11-5	.688	22-11	.667
5	Oklahoma State	10-6	.625	23-11	.676
6	Nebraska	10–6	.625	20–13	.606
7	Kansas State	7–9	.438	20-13	.606
8	Colorado	7-9	.438	18-15	.545
9	Iowa State	6-10	.375	15–15	.500
10	Texas A&M	5-11	.313	12-15	.444
11	Texas Tech	5-11	.313	13-17	.433
12	Baylor	0-16	.000	6-24	.200

== Schedule ==
Date time, TV	Rank^{#}	Opponent^{#}	Result	Record	Site city, state
11/13/1998*	No. 8	Gonzaga	W 80-66	1–0	Allen Fieldhouse; Lawrence, KS
11/17/1998*	No. 8	at Penn	W 61-56	2–0	The Palestra; Philadelphia, PA
11/21/1998*	No. 8	Fort Hays State	W 91-67	3–0	Allen Fieldhouse; Lawrence, KS
11/27/1998*	No. 8	vs. UNLV; Tip-Off Classic	W 78-50	4–0	MassMutual Center; Springfield, MA
12/01/1998*	No. 7	vs. No. 8 Kentucky; Great Eight	L 45-63	4-1	United Center; Chicago, IL
12/05/1998*	No. 7	at Pepperdine; John R. Wooden Classic	W 62-55	5-1	Firestone Fieldhouse; Malibu, CA
12/08/1998*	No. 10	Iowa	L 81-85	5-2	Allen Fieldhouse; Lawrence, KS
12/12/1998*	No. 10	USC	W 107-78	6-2	Allen Fieldhouse; Lawnrence, KS
12/17/1998*	No. 13	DePaul	W 74-68	7-2	Allen Fieldhouse; Lawrence, KS
12/19/1998*	No. 13	vs. Illinois; Sprint Shootout	W 65-55	8-2	Kemper Arena; Kansas City, MO
12/23/1998*	No. 13	at Saint Louis	L 64-78	8-3	Scottrade Center; Saint Louis, MO
01/02/1999; 9:05PM	No. 18	Texas A&M	W 95-57	9-3	Allen Fieldhouse; Lawrence, KS
1/6/1999	No. 18	at Baylor	W 66-62	10-3	Ferrell Center; Waco, TX
1/9/1999	No. 18	Iowa State	W 74-60	11-3	Allen Fieldhouse; Lawrence, KS
1/11/1999	No. 18	at Missouri; Border War	W 73-61	12-3	Hearnes Center; Columbia, MO
1/16/1999*	No. 15	at UMass	L 60-64	12-4	Mullins Center; Amherst, MA
1/18/1999	No. 15	Texas	W 76-67	13-4	Allen Fieldhouse; Lawrence, KS
1/24/1999	No. 19	Missouri; Border War	L 63-71	13-5	Allen Fieldhouse; Lawrence, KS
1/27/1999	No. 22	at Nebraska	L 69-84	13-6	Bob Devaney Sports Center; Lincoln, NE
1/30/1999	No. 22	Colorado	W 77-74	14-6	Allen Fieldhouse; Lawrence, KS
2/1/1999	No. 22	at Kansas State; Sunflower Showdown	W 69-46	15-6	Bramlage Coliseum; Manhattan, KS
2/7/1999		at Colorado	W 86-80	16-6	Coors Events Center; Boulder, CO
2/10/1999	No. 24	Nebraska	L 59-64	16-7	Allen Fieldhouse; Lawrence, KS
2/13/1999	No. 24	at Texas Tech	L 84-90	16-8	Lubbock Municipal Coliseum; Lubbock, TX
2/17/1999		Kansas State; Sunflower Showdown	W 62-47	17-8	Allen Fieldhouse; Lawrence, KS
2/20/1999		at Oklahoma	W 60-50	18-8	Lloyd Noble Center; Norman, OK
2/22/1999		Oklahoma State	W 67-66 ^{OT}	19-8	Allen Fieldhouse; Lawrence, KS
2/28/1999		at Iowa State	L 50-52	19-9	Hilton Coliseum; Ames, IA
Big 12 tournament
3/5/1999		vs. Nebraska; Quarterfinals	W 77-53	20-9	Kemper Arena; Kansas City, MO
3/6/1999		vs. Kansas State; Semifinals	W 69-58	21-9	Kemper Arena; Kansas City, MO
3/7/1999		vs. Oklahoma State; Championship Game	W 53-37	22-9	Kemper Arena; Kansas City, MO
NCAA tournament
3/12/1999*	No. 22 (6)	vs. (11) Evansville; First Round	W 95-74	23-9	Louisiana Superdome; New Orleans, LA
3/14/1999*	No. 22 (6)	vs. No. 8 (3) Kentucky; Second Round	L 88-92 ^{OT}	23-10	Louisiana Superdome; New Orleans
*Non-conference game. ^{#}Rankings from AP Poll, NCAA tournament seeds shown in parentheses. (#) Tournament seedings in parentheses. All times are in Central Standard Time.

== Rankings ==
Poll	Pre	Wk 1	Wk 2	Wk 3	Wk 4	Wk 5	Wk 6	Wk 7	Wk 8	Wk 9	Wk 10	Wk 11	Wk 12	Wk 13	Wk 14	Wk 15	Wk 16	Wk 17
AP	8	8	8	7	10	13	13	18	18	15	19	22		24				22
Coaches																		

*There was no coaches poll in week 1.

== See also ==
- 1999 NCAA Division I men's basketball tournament
- 1999 Big 12 men's basketball tournament
- 1998–99 NCAA Division I men's basketball season
