= 1991–92 Houston Cougars men's basketball team =

American college basketball season

1991–92 Houston Cougars men's basketball
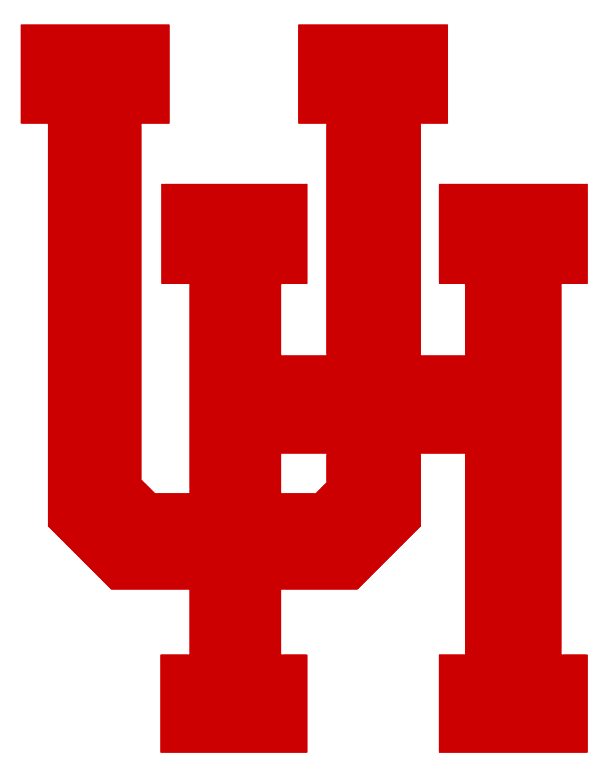

SWC tournament champions SWC regular season co-champions

NCAA tournament, First Round
- Conference: Southwest Conference
- Record: 25–6 (11–3 SWC)
- Head coach: Pat Foster (6th season)
- Assistant coaches: Alvin Brooks; Tommy Jones
- Home arena: Hofheinz Pavilion

1991–92 Southwest Conference men's basketball standings
	Conf.				Overall
Team	W		L	PCT	W		L	PCT
Houston †	11	–	3	.786	25	–	6	.806
Texas	11	–	3	.786	23	–	12	.657
TCU	9	–	5	.643	23	–	11	.676
Rice	8	–	6	.571	20	–	11	.645
Texas Tech	6	–	8	.429	15	–	14	.517
Baylor	5	–	9	.357	13	–	15	.464
SMU	4	–	10	.286	10	–	18	.357
Texas A&M	2	–	12	.143	6	–	22	.214
† 1992 SWC tournament winner Rankings from AP poll

The 1991–92 Houston Cougars men's basketball team represented the University of Houston as a member of the Southwest Conference during the 1991–92 NCAA men's basketball season. The head coach was Pat Foster, and the team played its home games at the Hofheinz Pavilion in Houston, Texas.

The Cougars tied for the regular season SWC title and won the SWC tournament to earn an automatic bid to the NCAA tournament. Houston lost in the opening round to Georgia Tech, 65–60, to finish with a record of 25–6 (11–3 SWC).

== Roster ==
1991–92 Houston Cougars men's basketball team
Players
Coaches

Pos.	#	Name	Height	Weight	Year	Previous school	Hometown
F	3	Craig Upchurch	6 ft 8 in (2.03 m)	—	Sr
G	34	David Díaz	6 ft 6 in (1.98 m)	—	Jr
SF	44	Sam Mack	6 ft 7 in (2.01 m)	210 lb (95 kg)	Sr	Tyler JC	Dolton, Illinois
F/C	45	Bo Outlaw	6 ft 8 in (2.03 m)	210 lb (95 kg)	Jr	South Plains CC	San Antonio, Texas

Head coach

- Pat Foster

Assistant coach(es)

- Alvin Brooks
- Tommy Jones

Legend

- (C) Team captain
- (S) Suspended
- (I) Ineligible
- (W) Walk-on
- Injured
- Current redshirt

== Schedule and results ==
Date time, TV	Rank^{#}	Opponent^{#}	Result	Record	Site (attendance) city, state
Regular season
Nov 23, 1991*		Villanova	W 79–49	1–0	Hofheinz Pavilion; Houston, Texas
Nov 27, 1991*		No. 6 North Carolina	L 65–68	1–1	Hofheinz Pavilion; Houston, Texas
Nov 30, 1991*		North Texas	W 89–87	2–1	Hofheinz Pavilion; Houston, Texas
Dec 3, 1991*		Arkansas State	W 72–54	3–1	Hofheinz Pavilion; Houston, Texas
Dec 6, 1991*		at UC Irvine; Disneyland Freedom Bowl Classic	W 73–51	4–1	Bren Events Center; Irvine, California
Dec 7, 1991*		vs. Kent State; Disneyland Freedom Bowl Classic	W 80–56	5–1	Bren Events Center; Irvine, California
Dec 14, 1991*		at UIC	W 75–66	6–1	UIC Pavilion; Chicago, Illinois
Dec 19, 1991*		St. Mary's	W 94–67	7–1	Hofheinz Pavilion; Houston, Texas
Dec 21, 1991*		at California	W 81–75	8–1	Harmon Gym; Berkeley, California
Dec 30, 1991*		Cal State Fullerton	W 83–67	9–1	Hofheinz Pavilion; Houston, Texas
Jan 2, 1992*		at No. 24 Louisville	L 56–60	9–2	Freedom Hall; Louisville, Kentucky
Jan 6, 1992*		at Centenary (LA)	W 105–81	10–2	Gold Dome; Shreveport, Louisiana
Jan 9, 1992		at Texas	L 75–86	10–3 (0–1)	Frank Erwin Center; Austin, Texas
Jan 11, 1992		Baylor	W 83–77	11–3 (1–1)	Hofheinz Pavilion; Houston, Texas
Jan 18, 1992		at Rice	W 74–60	12–3 (2–1)	Rice Gymnasium; Houston, Texas
Jan 21, 1992*		Saint Louis	W 110–88	13–3	Hofheinz Pavilion; Houston, Texas
Jan 25, 1992		Texas Tech	W 77–58	14–3 (3–1)	Hofheinz Pavilion; Houston, Texas
Jan 29, 1992		at Texas A&M	W 69–65	15–3 (4–1)	G. Rollie White Coliseum; College Station, Texas
Feb 5, 1992		at TCU	L 54–67	15–4 (4–2)	Daniel-Meyer Coliseum; Fort Worth, Texas
Feb 5, 1992		SMU	W 67–50	16–4 (5–2)	Hofheinz Pavilion; Houston, Texas
Feb 9, 1992		Texas	L 72–87	16–5 (5–3)	Hofheinz Pavilion; Houston, Texas
Feb 12, 1992		at Baylor	W 98–92	17–5 (6–3)	Ferrell Center; Waco, Texas
Feb 19, 1992		Rice	W 86–83	18–5 (7–3)	Hofheinz Pavilion; Houston, Texas
Feb 26, 1992		at Texas Tech	W 83–80	19–5 (8–3)	Lubbock Municipal Coliseum; Lubbock, Texas
Feb 29, 1992		Texas A&M	W 79–69	20–5 (9–3)	Hofheinz Pavilion; Houston, Texas
Mar 4, 1992		TCU	W 50–44	21–5 (10–3)	Hofheinz Pavilion; Houston, Texas
Mar 7, 1992		at SMU	W 69–62	22–5 (11–3)	Moody Coliseum; University Park, Texas
SWC tournament
Mar 13, 1992*	(2)	vs. (7) SMU; Quarterfinals	W 73–62	23–5	Reunion Arena; Dallas, Texas
Mar 14, 1992*	(2)	vs. (3) TCU; Semifinals	W 87–84 ^{2OT}	24–5	Reunion Arena; Dallas, Texas
Mar 15, 1992*	(2)	vs. (1) Texas; Championship	W 91–72	25–5	Reunion Arena; Dallas, Texas
NCAA tournament
Mar 19, 1992*	(10 MW)	vs. (7 MW) Georgia Tech; First Round	L 60–65	25–6	Bradley Center; Milwaukee, Wisconsin
*Non-conference game. ^{#}Rankings from AP poll. (#) Tournament seedings in parentheses. MW=Midwest.
