= 1998–99 Nebraska Cornhuskers men's basketball team =

American college basketball season

1998–99 Nebraska Cornhuskers men's basketball

NIT, Second Round
- Conference: Big 12 Conference
- Record: 20–13 (10–6 Big 12)
- Head coach: Danny Nee (13th season)
- Assistant coaches: Cleo Hill; Randy Roth; Jimmy Williams
- Home arena: Bob Devaney Sports Center

1998–99 Big 12 men's basketball standings
	Conf.				Overall
Team	W		L	PCT	W		L	PCT
Texas	13	–	3	.813	19	–	13	.594
Missouri	11	–	5	.688	20	–	9	.690
No. 22 Kansas †	11	–	5	.688	23	–	10	.697
Oklahoma	11	–	5	.688	22	–	11	.667
Oklahoma State	10	–	6	.625	23	–	11	.676
Nebraska	10	–	6	.625	20	–	13	.606
Kansas State	7	–	9	.438	20	–	13	.606
Colorado	7	–	9	.438	18	–	15	.545
Iowa State	6	–	10	.375	15	–	15	.500
Texas A&M	5	–	11	.313	12	–	15	.444
Texas Tech	5	–	11	.313	13	–	17	.433
Baylor	0	–	16	.000	6	–	24	.200
† 1999 Big 12 Tournament winner Rankings from AP poll

The 1998–99 Nebraska Cornhuskers men's basketball team represented the University of Nebraska–Lincoln during the 1998–99 college basketball season. Led by head coach Danny Nee (13th season), the Cornhuskers competed in the Big Twelve Conference and played their home games at the Bob Devaney Sports Center. They finished with a record of 20–13 overall and a 10–6 record in Big Twelve Conference play. Senior center Venson Hamilton was named the Big 12 Player of the Year. Nebraska played in the National Invitation Tournament, and advanced to the second round.

== Roster ==
1998–99 Nebraska Cornhuskers men's basketball team
Players
Coaches

Pos.	#	Name	Height	Weight	Year	Previous school	Hometown
G	3	Cary Cochran	6 ft 1 in (1.85 m)	185 lb (84 kg)	Fr	Tri-Center	Minden, IA
C	4	Venson Hamilton	6 ft 10 in (2.08 m)	240 lb (109 kg)	Sr	Oak Hill Academy	Forest City, NC
F	5	Larry Florence	6 ft 5 in (1.96 m)	220 lb (100 kg)	Sr	Central	Phenix City, AL
G	11	Rodney Fields	6 ft 2 in (1.88 m)	210 lb (95 kg)	Jr	Tampa Bay Tech	Tampa, FL
F	15	Chad Johnson	6 ft 6 in (1.98 m)	215 lb (98 kg)	So	Florida A&M	Monticello, FL
G	20	Todd Smith	6 ft 4 in (1.93 m)	195 lb (88 kg)	Fr	Baldwin	Milledgeville, GA
G	30	Cookie Belcher	6 ft 3 in (1.91 m)	205 lb (93 kg)	Jr	Mexico	Mexico, MO
F	34	Troy Piatkowski	6 ft 5 in (1.96 m)	200 lb (91 kg)	Sr	Stevens	Rapid City, SD
F	44	Andy Markowski	6 ft 8 in (2.03 m)	215 lb (98 kg)	Sr	Ord	Ord, NE
C	52	Brant Harriman	6 ft 10 in (2.08 m)	260 lb (118 kg)	So	Mason City	Mason City, IA

Head coach

- Danny Nee

Assistant coach(es)

- Jimmy Williams
- Randy Roth
- Cleo Hill

Legend

- (C) Team captain
- (S) Suspended
- (I) Ineligible
- (W) Walk-on
- Injured
- Current redshirt

Roster

== Schedule and results ==
Date time, TV	Rank^{#}	Opponent^{#}	Result	Record	Site city, state
Regular season
Nov 14, 1998*		UNC Greensboro	W 79–59	1–0	Bob Devaney Sports Center; Lincoln, NE
Nov 19, 1998*		vs. Villanova; Top of the World Classic	L 70–85	1–1	Carlson Center; Fairbanks, AK
Nov 21, 1998*		vs. Washington State; Top of the World Classic	W 95–84	2–1	Carlson Center; Fairbanks, AK
Nov 22, 1998*		vs. Wisconsin; Top of the World Classic	L 41–78	2–2	Carlson Center; Fairbanks, AK
Nov 28, 1998*		North Carolina A&T	W 65–47	3–2	Bob Devaney Sports Center; Lincoln, NE
Dec 1, 1998*		Tulsa	L 49–52	3–3	Bob Devaney Sports Center; Lincoln, NE
Dec 4, 1998*		Southwest Texas State; Ameritas Classic	W 63–54	4–3	Bob Devaney Sports Center; Lincoln, NE
Dec 5, 1998*		Colgate; Ameritas Classic	W 60–48	5–3	Bob Devaney Sports Center; Lincoln, NE
Dec 9, 1998*		Creighton; Rivalry	W 76–60	6–3	Bob Devaney Sports Center; Lincoln, NE
Dec 12, 1998*		at Colorado State	L 49–75	6–4	Moby Arena; Fort Collins, CO
Dec 19, 1998*		No. 17 Minnesota	L 51–55	6–5	Bob Devaney Sports Center; Lincoln, NE
Dec 27, 1998*		at San Francisco	W 62–52	7–5	War Memorial Gymnasium; San Francisco, CA
Dec 30, 1998*		at UMKC	W 81–65	8–5	Municipal Auditorium; Kansas City, MO
Jan 2, 1999		at Missouri	L 57–80	8–6 (0–1)	Hearnes Center; Columbia, MO
Jan 10, 1999		Texas	L 76–89	8–7 (0–2)	Bob Devaney Sports Center; Lincoln, NE
Jan 13, 1999		Kansas State	W 70–61	9–7 (1–2)	Bob Devaney Sports Center; Lincoln, NE
Jan 16, 1999		at Baylor	W 68–55	10–7 (2–2)	Ferrell Center; Waco, TX
Jan 20, 1999		at No. 25 Oklahoma	W 96–81	11–7 (3–2)	Lloyd Noble Center; Norman, OK
Jan 23, 1999		Colorado	W 72–55	12–7 (4–2)	Bob Devaney Sports Center; Lincoln, NE
Jan 27, 1999		No. 20 Kansas	W 84–69	13–7 (5–2)	Bob Devaney Sports Center; Lincoln, NE
Jan 30, 1999		at Iowa State	L 47–52	13–8 (5–3)	Hilton Coliseum; Ames, IA
Feb 3, 1999		at Colorado	W 57–52	14–8 (6–3)	Coors Events/Conference Center; Boulder, CO
Feb 6, 1999		No. 24 Missouri	W 69–61	15–8 (7–3)	Bob Devaney Sports Center; Lincoln, NE
Feb 10, 1999		at No. 24 Kansas	W 64–59	16–8 (8–3)	Allen Fieldhouse; Lawrence, KS
Feb 13, 1999		Iowa State	W 59–57	17–8 (9–3)	Bob Devaney Sports Center; Lincoln, NE
Feb 17, 1999		at Oklahoma State	L 48–60	17–9 (9–4)	Gallagher-Iba Arena; Stillwater, OK
Feb 20, 1999		at Texas Tech	L 68–73	17–10 (9–5)	Lubbock Municipal Coliseum; Lubbock, TX
Feb 24, 1999		at Kansas State	L 45–62	17–11 (9–6)	Bramlage Coliseum; Manhattan, KS
Feb 27, 1999		Texas A&M	W 87–68	18–11 (10–6)	Bob Devaney Sports Center; Lincoln, NE
Big 12 tournament
Mar 4, 1999*		vs. Texas Texas; First Round	W 69–50	19–11	Kemper Arena; Kansas City, MO
Mar 5, 1999*		vs. Kansas; Quarterfinals	L 53–77	19–12	Kemper Arena; Kansas City, MO
NIT
Mar 10, 1999*		UNLV; First Round	W 68–55	20–12	Bob Devaney Sports Center; Lincoln, NE
Mar 15, 1999*		at TCU; Second Round	L 89–101	20–13	Daniel-Meyer Coliseum; Fort Worth, TX
*Non-conference game. ^{#}Rankings from AP poll. (#) Tournament seedings in parentheses. All times are in Central Time.

== Awards and honors ==
- Venson Hamilton – Big 12 Player of the Year
