= 1999 Big 12 men's basketball tournament =

- Classification: Division I
- Season: 1998–99
- Teams: 12
- Site: Kemper Arena; Kansas City, Missouri
- Champions: Kansas (3rd title)
- Winning coach: Roy Williams (3rd title)
- MVP: Jeff Boschee (Kansas)
- Attendance: 106,600 (overall); 18,000 (championship)
- Top scorer: Glendon Alexander (Oklahoma State) (66 points)
- Television: ESPN

1998–99 Big 12 men's basketball standings
| | Conf. | | | | Overall |
| Team | W | | L | PCT | W | | L | PCT |
|---|---|---|---|---|---|---|---|---|
| Texas | 13 | – | 3 | .813 | 19 | – | 13 | .594 |
| Missouri | 11 | – | 5 | .688 | 20 | – | 9 | .690 |
| No. 22 Kansas † | 11 | – | 5 | .688 | 23 | – | 10 | .697 |
| Oklahoma | 11 | – | 5 | .688 | 22 | – | 11 | .667 |
| Oklahoma State | 10 | – | 6 | .625 | 23 | – | 11 | .676 |
| Nebraska | 10 | – | 6 | .625 | 20 | – | 13 | .606 |
| Kansas State | 7 | – | 9 | .438 | 20 | – | 13 | .606 |
| Colorado | 7 | – | 9 | .438 | 18 | – | 15 | .545 |
| Iowa State | 6 | – | 10 | .375 | 15 | – | 15 | .500 |
| Texas A&M | 5 | – | 11 | .313 | 12 | – | 15 | .444 |
| Texas Tech | 5 | – | 11 | .313 | 13 | – | 17 | .433 |
| Baylor | 0 | – | 16 | .000 | 6 | – | 24 | .200 |
† 1999 Big 12 Tournament winner Rankings from AP poll

The 1999 Phillips 66 Big 12 men's basketball tournament was the postseason men's basketball tournament for the Big 12 Conference. It was played from March 4–7 at Kemper Arena in Kansas City, Missouri. No. 3 seed Kansas defeated Oklahoma State 53–37 to win the championship and receive the Big 12's automatic bid to the 1999 NCAA tournament.

== Seeding ==
The Tournament consisted of a 12 team single-elimination tournament with the top 4 seeds receiving a bye.

1999 Big 12 Men's Basketball Tournament seeds
| Seed | School | Conf. | Over. | Tiebreaker |
| 1 | Texas ‡# | 13–3 | 19–13 | |
| 2 | Missouri # | 11–5 | 20–9 | 1–1 vs. KU, 7–3 vs. division |
| 3 | Kansas # | 11–5 | 23–10 | 1–1 vs. MU, 6–4 vs. division |
| 4 | Oklahoma # | 11–5 | 22–11 | |
| 5 | Oklahoma State | 10–6 | 23–11 | 1–0 vs. NU |
| 6 | Nebraska | 10–6 | 20–13 | 0–1 vs. OSU |
| 7 | Kansas State | 7–9 | 20–13 | 1–1 vs. CU, 4–6 vs. division |
| 8 | Colorado | 7–9 | 18–15 | 1–1 vs. KSU, 3–7 vs. division |
| 9 | Iowa State | 6–10 | 15–15 | |
| 10 | Texas A&M | 5–11 | 12–15 | 1–1 vs. TT, 4–6 vs. division |
| 11 | Texas Tech | 5–11 | 13–17 | 1–1 vs. TAMU, 3–7 vs. division |
| 12 | Baylor | 0–16 | 6–24 | |
‡ – Big 12 Conference regular season champions, and tournament No. 1 seed. # – Received a single-bye in the conference tournament. Overall records include all games played in the Big 12 Conference tournament.Divisions (North/South) used only for tie breaking purposes.

== Schedule ==
| Session | Game | Time | Matchup | Television | Attendance |
First Round – Thursday, March 4
| 1 | 1 | 12:00 PM | #8 Colorado 69 vs #9 Iowa State 61 | Big 12 | 16,800 |
| 1 | 2 | 2:20 PM | #5 Oklahoma State 83 vs #12 Baylor 57 | Big 12 | 16,800 |
| 2 | 3 | 6:00 PM | #7 Kansas State 87 vs #10 Texas A&M 76 | Big 12 | 17,000 |
| 2 | 4 | 8:20 PM | #6 Nebraska 69 vs #11 Texas Tech 50 | Big 12 | 17,000 |
Quarterfinals – Friday, March 5
| 3 | 5 | 12:00 PM | #1 Texas 82 vs #8 Colorado 76 | Big 12 | 17,000 |
| 3 | 6 | 2:20 PM | #5 Oklahoma State 60 vs #4 Oklahoma 57 | Big 12 | 17,000 |
| 4 | 7 | 6:00 PM | #7 Kansas State 84 vs #2 Missouri 74 | Big 12 | 18,900 |
| 4 | 8 | 8:20 PM | #3 Kansas 77 vs #6 Nebraska 53 | Big 12 | 18,900 |
Semifinals – Saturday, March 6
| 5 | 9 | 1:00 PM | #5 Oklahoma State 59 vs #1 Texas 57 | Big 12 | 18,900 |
| 5 | 10 | 3:20 PM | #3 Kansas 69 vs #7 Kansas State 58 | Big 12 | 18,900 |
Final – Sunday, March 7
| 6 | 11 | 2:00 PM | #3 Kansas 53 vs #5 Oklahoma State 37 | ESPN | 18,000 |
Game times in CT. #-Rankings denote tournament seed

== Bracket ==
First round
8 | Colorado | 69
9 | Iowa State | 61
5 | Oklahoma St. | 83
12 | Baylor | 57
7 | Kansas State | 87
10 | Texas A&M | 76
6 | Nebraska | 69
11 | Texas Tech | 50

Quarterfinals
1 | Texas | 82
8 | Colorado | 76
5 | Oklahoma St. | 60
4 | Oklahoma | 57
7 | Kansas State | 84
2 | No. 24 Missouri | 74
3 | Kansas | 77
6 | Nebraska | 53

Semifinals
5 | Oklahoma St. | 59
1 | Texas | 57
3 | Kansas | 69
7 | Kansas State | 58

Finals
3 | Kansas | 53
5 | Oklahoma St | 37

== All-Tournament Team ==
Most Outstanding Player – Jeff Boschee, Kansas

| Player | Team | Position | Class |
|---|---|---|---|
| Jeff Boschee | Kansas | Fr. | G |
| Eric Chenowith | Kansas | So. | C |
| Glendon Alexander | Oklahoma State | Jr. | G/F |
| Adrian Peterson | Oklahoma State | Sr. | G |
| Chris Mihm | Texas | So. | C |

== See also ==
- 1999 Big 12 Conference women's basketball tournament
- 1999 NCAA Division I men's basketball tournament
- 1998–99 NCAA Division I men's basketball rankings
