= Jeff Boschee =

American basketball player and coach

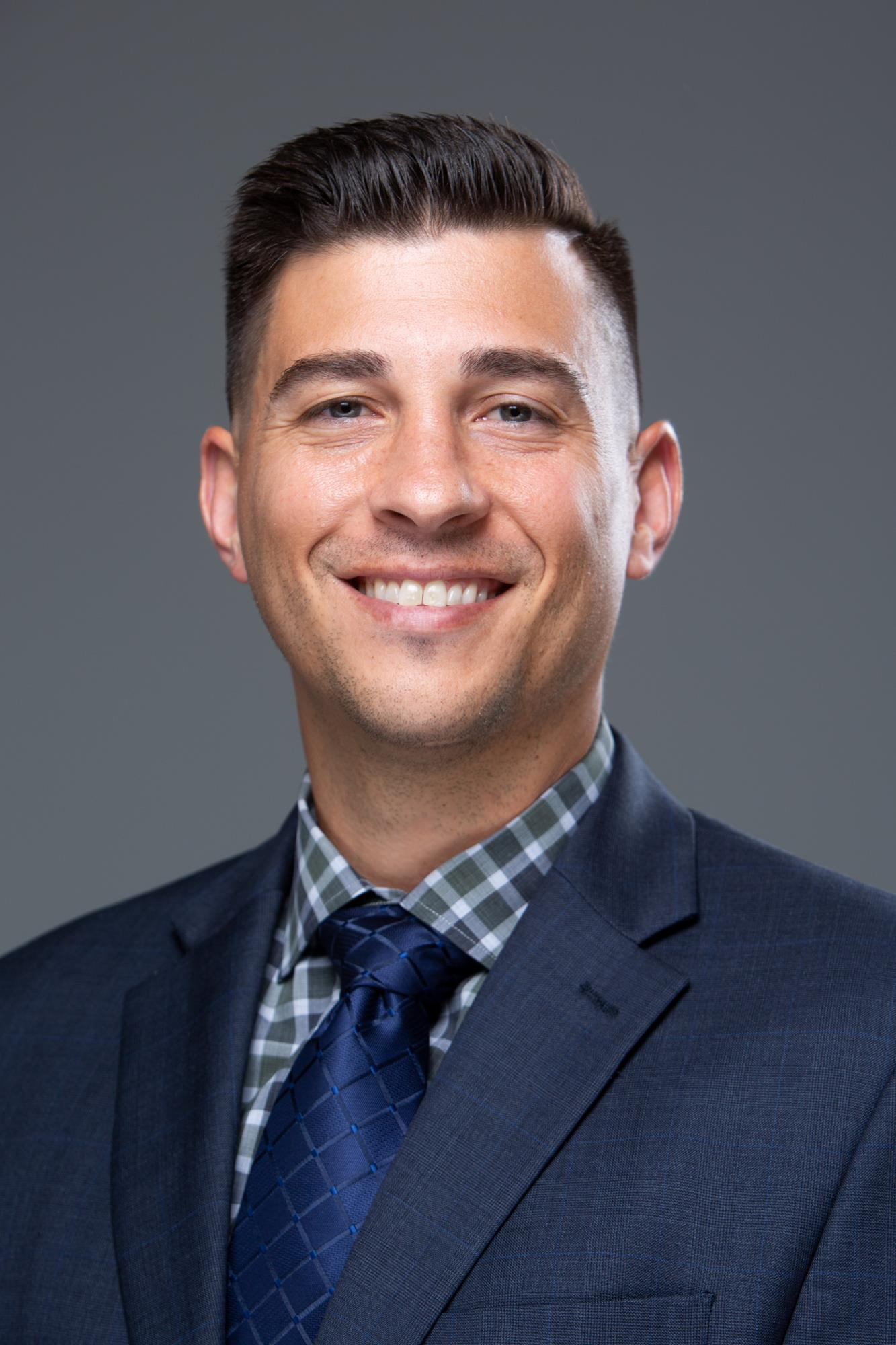

Pittsburg State Gorillas
- Title: Head coach
- League: The MIAA

Personal information
- Born: December 21, 1979 (age 46) Valley City, North Dakota, U.S.
- Listed height: 6 ft 1 in (1.85 m)
- Listed weight: 218 lb (99 kg)

Career information
- High school: Valley City (Valley City, North Dakota)
- College: Kansas (1998–2002)
- NBA draft: 2002: undrafted
- Playing career: 2003–2005
- Position: Point guard

Career history

Playing
- 2003–2004: Kansas Cagerz
- 2004: Panellinios B.C.
- 2004–2005: Kansas City Knights
- 2005: Grindavík

Coaching
- 2010–2014: Missouri Southern (assistant)
- 2014–2022: Missouri Southern
- 2022–present: Pittsburg State

Career highlights
- As player: Big 12 tournament MVP (1999); McDonald's All-American (1998); Third-team Parade All-American (1998); North Dakota Mr. Basketball (1998); As coach: MIAA Coach of the Year (2018)

Jeffrey Allen Boschee (/ˈboʊʃiː/; born on December 21, 1979) is an American former basketball player and current coach. He currently serves as head coach of the men's team at Pittsburg State University in Pittsburg, Kansas. He was formerly the head coach at Missouri Southern State University in Joplin, Missouri. Boschee played guard at the University of Kansas from 1998 to 2002. He was named Mr. Basketball for North Dakota in 1998.

== Playing career ==
=== High school career ===
After a successful career at Valley City High School, Boschee was named a Parade Magazine All-American, USA Today Top 25 selection, and played in the McDonald's All-American game.

=== College career ===
Boschee was a four-year starter at Kansas under former KU coach Roy Williams from 1998 to 2002. While at KU he won a conference championship and a conference tournament championship, and played in the 2002 NCAA Final Four. He was voted freshman of the year, and was named 3rd Team All-Big 12 as a senior. He is first all-time at KU in three-point field goals made and second all-time in games started. He once held the Big 12 career record for 3-pointers with 338, but on January 31, 2009, this was eclipsed by Texas's A. J. Abrams.

=== Professional career ===
After his final season at Kansas, Boschee enrolled in some classes to finish his degree in sports management as well as playing for the practice squad. After graduating in the spring of 2003, he signed with Kansas Cagerz of the United States Basketball League for the last 10 games of the season where he averaged 9.2 points a game. He returned to the Cagerz the following season and averaged 13.2 points per game.

In August 2004, he signed with Panellinios B.C. in Greece. During training camp, he sprained his ankle and missed three weeks. In October, he was further diagnosed with cysts growing on both his hip sockets, with the left one leaking fluid into his hip and was subsequently released by the club. He returned to the United States and signed with Kansas City Knights of the American Basketball Association. In February 2005, he signed with Grindavík of the Icelandic Úrvalsdeild karla. He appeared in six regular season games, averaging 17.0 points and 4.0 assist per game. In the playoffs, Grindavík lost in the first round against eventual champions Keflavík in three games where Boschee averaged a team high 22.3 points and 3.3 assists per game.

== Coaching career ==
Boschee is a former assistant coach at Blue Valley Northwest High School located in Overland Park, Kansas. He was the head boys' basketball coach at The Barstow School in Kansas City, Missouri. Barstow concluded its 2007–08 season with a 20–5 record, the third-best mark in school history. In his second season as Barstow's varsity coach, Boschee's team finished with a 22–4 record. Boschee's third Barstow team completed the 2009–10 season with a 22–5 mark.

On May 13, 2010, it was announced that Boschee has joined the coaching staff of Div. II Missouri Southern State University, in Joplin, Missouri.

On March 29, 2014, it was announced that Boschee was promoted to head coach at Missouri Southern from assistant coach.

On March 9, 2022, Boschee was announced as the 16th head coach at Pittsburg State, also in the MIAA.

== Statistics ==
=== 1999–2000 ===
1999–2000 Season totals

Season totals
Month	MIN	FGM	FGA	3FM	3FA	FTM	FTA	OR	DR	TR	AST	F	STL	TO	BLK	PTS
November	76	17	24	11	14	2	2	1	2	3	13	9	4	7	0	47
December	198	28	57	21	40	13	16	2	10	12	32	19	9	14	0	90
January	193	21	64	15	46	5	7	2	9	11	20	17	11	20	17	11
February	263	28	89	21	63	16	20	3	17	20	24	23	8	16	0	93
March	152	16	44	13	32	2	2	6	5	11	11	10	5	5	0	47
Season	882	110	278	81	195	38	47	14	43	57	100	78	37	55	2	339

Season averages

1999–2000 Season averages
Month	MIN	FGM	FGA	3FM	3FA	FTM	FTA	OR	DR	TR	AST	F	STL	TO	BLK	PTS
Season	25.9	3.2	8.2	2.4	5.7	1.1	1.4	0.4	1.3	1.7	2.9	2.3	1.1	1.6	0.1	10.0

== Head coaching record ==
Record table
Season	Team	Overall	Conference	Standing	Postseason
Missouri Southern (Mid-America Intercollegiate Athletics Association) (2014–2022)
2014–15	Missouri Southern	20–11	12–7	T–3rd	
2015–16	Missouri Southern	18–12	14–8	T–2nd	
2016–17	Missouri Southern	18–12	11–8	T–4th	
2017–18	Missouri Southern	20–10	15–4	2nd	
2018–19	Missouri Southern	25–8	14–5	3rd	
2019–20	Missouri Southern	23–8	14–5	3rd	
2020–21	Missouri Southern	13–10	13–9	T–3rd	
2021–22	Missouri Southern	14–15	11–11	6th	
Missouri Southern:		151–86 (.637)	104–57 (.646)		
Pittsburg State (Mid-America Intercollegiate Athletics Association) (2022–present)
2022–23	Pittsburg State	8–20	5–17	13th	
2023–24	Pittsburg State	21–11	15–7	3rd	
2024–25	Pittsburg State	18–12	13-6	T–2nd	
Pittsburg State:		47–43 (.522)	33–30 (.524)		
Total:		198–119 (.625)			
National champion Postseason invitational champion Conference regular season champion Conference regular season and conference tournament champion Division regular season champion Division regular season and conference tournament champion Conference tournament champion
