= 1998–99 Temple Owls men's basketball team =

American college basketball season

1998–99 Temple Owls men's basketball

Atlantic 10 Regular season champion Atlantic 10 East champion

NCAA tournament, Elite Eight
- Conference: Atlantic 10 Conference

Ranking
- Coaches: No. 14
- Record: 24–11 (13–3 A–10)
- Head coach: John Chaney (17th season)
- Assistant coach: Dan Leibovitz (3rd season)
- Home arena: The Apollo of Temple

1998–99 Atlantic 10 men's basketball standings
	Conf.				Overall
Team	W		L	PCT	W		L	PCT
East
Temple	13	–	3	.813	24	–	11	.686
Rhode Island †	10	–	6	.625	20	–	13	.606
UMass	9	–	7	.563	14	–	16	.467
St. Bonaventure	8	–	8	.500	14	–	15	.483
Fordham	5	–	11	.313	12	–	15	.444
Saint Joseph's	5	–	11	.313	12	–	18	.400
West
George Washington	13	–	3	.813	20	–	9	.690
Xavier	12	–	4	.750	25	–	11	.694
La Salle	8	–	8	.500	13	–	15	.464
Virginia Tech	7	–	9	.438	13	–	15	.464
Dayton	5	–	11	.313	11	–	17	.393
Duquesne	1	–	15	.063	5	–	23	.179
† 1999 Atlantic 10 Tournament winner Rankings from AP poll

The 1998–99 Temple Owls men's basketball team represented Temple University as a member of the Atlantic 10 Conference during the 1998–99 NCAA Division I men's basketball season. The team was led by head coach John Chaney and played their home games at the Liacouras Center. The Owls received an at-large bid to the NCAA tournament as No. 6 seed in the East region. Temple made a run to the Elite Eight and finished with a record of 24–11 (13–3 A-10).

== Roster ==
1998–99 Temple Owls men's basketball team
Players
Coaches

Pos.	#	Name	Height	Weight	Year	Hometown
G	4	Pepe Sánchez	6 ft 4 in (1.93 m)	—	Jr	Bahía Blanca, Argentina
G	14	Lynn Greer	6 ft 1 in (1.85 m)	175 lb (79 kg)	So	Philadelphia, Pennsylvania
G	21	Rasheed Brokenborough	6 ft 3 in (1.91 m)	195 lb (88 kg)	Sr	Philadelphia, Pennsylvania
G/F	25	Mark Karcher	6 ft 5 in (1.96 m)	210 lb (95 kg)	Jr	Baltimore, Maryland
C	30	Ron Rollerson	6 ft 10 in (2.08 m)	290 lb (132 kg)	Fr
F/C	32	Lamont Barnes	6 ft 10 in (2.08 m)	230 lb (104 kg)	Jr	Hopkinsville, Kentucky
G	33	Quincy Wadley	6 ft 4 in (1.93 m)	195 lb (88 kg)	So	Harrisburg, Pennsylvania
F	42	Kevin Lyde	6 ft 10 in (2.08 m)	—	Fr
F	44	Mamadou Cellou Barry	6 ft 8 in (2.03 m)	234 lb (106 kg)	Fr
F		Keaton Sanders	6 ft 6 in (1.98 m)	—	Jr
F		Damien Read	6 ft 6 in (1.98 m)	—

Head coach

- John Chaney

Assistant coach(es)

Legend

- (C) Team captain
- (S) Suspended
- (I) Ineligible
- (W) Walk-on
- Injured
- Current redshirt

Roster

== Schedule ==
Date time, TV	Rank^{#}	Opponent^{#}	Result	Record	Site city, state
Regular season
Nov 10, 1998*	No. 7	vs. Georgetown; Coaches vs. Cancer IKON Classic	W 65–49	1–0	Madison Square Garden; New York, New York
Nov 11, 1998*	No. 7	vs. Wake Forest; Coaches vs. Cancer IKON Classic	W 59–48	2–0	Madison Square Garden; New York, New York
Nov 18, 1998*	No. 7	Ole Miss	W 68–52	3–0	The Apollo of Temple; Philadelphia, Pennsylvania
Nov 20, 1998*	No. 7	No. 5 Michigan State	W 60–59	4–0	The Apollo of Temple; Philadelphia, Pennsylvania
Nov 23, 1998*	No. 6	at Penn	L 70–73 ^{OT}	4–1	Palestra; Philadelphia, Pennsylvania
Dec 1, 1998*	No. 10	at Penn State	L 64–65	4–2	Bryce Jordan Center; University Park, Pennsylvania
Dec 5, 1998*	No. 10	at No. 16 Indiana	L 62–63	4–3	Assembly Hall; Bloomington, Indiana
Dec 9, 1998*	No. 16	Wisconsin	L 56–63	4–4	The Apollo of Temple; Philadelphia, Pennsylvania
Dec 14, 1998*	No. 16	Florida State	W 75–66	5–4	The Apollo of Temple; Philadelphia, Pennsylvania
Dec 19, 1998*		at Rutgers	W 56–38	6–4	Louis Brown Athletic Center; Piscataway, New Jersey
Dec 29, 1998*		vs. No. 5 Stanford; Pete Newell Classic	L 50–57	6–5	The Arena in Oakland; Oakland, California
Dec 31, 1998*		at Fresno State	L 63–66	6–6	Selland Arena; Fresno, California
Jan 3, 1999		at La Salle	W 82–45	7–6 (1–0)	Tom Gola Arena; Philadelphia, Pennsylvania
Jan 6, 1999		St. Bonaventure	W 70–54	8–6 (2–0)	The Apollo of Temple; Philadelphia, Pennsylvania
Jan 9, 1999		at Fordham	W 75–65	9–6 (3–0)	Rose Hill Gym; Bronx, New York
Jan 14, 1999		Saint Joseph's	W 62–47	10–6 (4–0)	The Apollo of Temple; Philadelphia, Pennsylvania
Jan 16, 1999		Rhode Island	W 76–63	11–6 (5–0)	The Apollo of Temple; Philadelphia, Pennsylvania
Jan 19, 1999		at Duquesne	W 75–52	12–6 (6–0)	A.J. Palumbo Center; Pittsburgh, Pennsylvania
Jan 23, 1999		UMass	W 65–57	13–6 (7–0)	The Apollo of Temple; Philadelphia, Pennsylvania
Jan 30, 1999		at St. Bonaventure	L 59–74	13–7 (7–1)	Reilly Center; St. Bonaventure, New York
Feb 4, 1999		Dayton	W 67–54	14–7 (8–1)	The Apollo of Temple; Philadelphia, Pennsylvania
Feb 6, 1999		at Rhode Island	W 72–63	15–7 (9–1)	Keaney Gymnasium; Kingston, Rhode Island
Feb 9, 1999		at Saint Joseph's	W 85–78	16–7 (10–1)	Hagan Arena; Philadelphia, Pennsylvania
Feb 14, 1999		at Xavier	L 60–62	16–8 (10–2)	Cincinnati Gardens; Cincinnati, Ohio
Feb 16, 1999		Virginia Tech	W 78–48	17–8 (11–2)	The Apollo of Temple; Philadelphia, Pennsylvania
Feb 20, 1999		George Washington	W 72–56	18–8 (12–2)	The Apollo of Temple; Philadelphia, Pennsylvania
Feb 24, 1999		Fordham	W 71–49	19–8 (13–2)	The Apollo of Temple; Philadelphia, Pennsylvania
Feb 28, 1999		at UMass	L 49–57	19–9 (13–3)	Mullins Center; Amherst, Massachusetts
Atlantic 10 Tournament
Mar 4, 1999*		vs. Virginia Tech; Quarterfinal	W 64–51	20–9	First Union Spectrum; Philadelphia, Pennsylvania
Mar 5, 1999*		vs. Xavier; Semifinal	W 76–64	21–9	First Union Spectrum; Philadelphia, Pennsylvania
Mar 6, 1999*		vs. Rhode Island; Championship Game	L 59–62	21–10	First Union Spectrum; Philadelphia, Pennsylvania
NCAA Tournament
Mar 12, 1999*	(6 E)	vs. (11 E) Kent State; First round	W 61–54	22–10	FleetCenter; Boston, Massachusetts
Mar 14, 1999*	(6 E)	vs. (3 E) No. 11 Cincinnati; Second Round	W 64–54	23–10	FleetCenter; Boston, Massachusetts
Mar 19, 1999*	(6 E)	vs. (10 E) Purdue; East Regional semifinal – Sweet Sixteen	W 77–55	24–10	Continental Airlines Arena; East Rutherford, New Jersey
Mar 21, 1999*	(6 E)	vs. (1 E) No. 1 Duke; East Regional final – Elite Eight	L 64–85	24–11	Continental Airlines Arena; East Rutherford, New Jersey
*Non-conference game. ^{#}Rankings from AP Poll. (#) Tournament seedings in parentheses. E=East. All times are in Eastern Standard Time.
