= 1998–99 Florida Gators men's basketball team =

American college basketball season

1998–99 Florida Gators men's basketball

Orange Bowl Classic Champion

NCAA tournament, Sweet Sixteen
- Conference: Southeastern Conference
- East

Ranking
- Coaches: No. 17
- AP: No. 23
- Record: 22–9 (10–6 SEC)
- Head coach: Billy Donovan (3rd season)
- Assistant coaches: John Pelphrey (3rd season); Anthony Grant (3rd season); Donnie Jones (3rd season)
- Home arena: O'Connell Center

1998–99 Southeastern Conference men's basketball standings
	Conf.				Overall
Team	W		L	PCT	W		L	PCT
East
No. 20 Tennessee	12	–	4	.750	21	–	9	.700
No. 8 Kentucky †	11	–	5	.688	28	–	9	.757
No. 23 Florida	10	–	6	.625	22	–	9	.710
Georgia	6	–	10	.375	15	–	15	.500
Vanderbilt	5	–	11	.313	14	–	15	.483
South Carolina	3	–	13	.188	8	–	21	.276
West
No. 4 Auburn	14	–	2	.875	29	–	4	.879
No. 17 Arkansas	9	–	7	.563	23	–	11	.676
Ole Miss	8	–	8	.500	20	–	13	.606
Mississippi State	8	–	8	.500	20	–	13	.606
Alabama	6	–	10	.375	17	–	15	.531
LSU	4	–	12	.250	12	–	15	.444
† 1999 SEC tournament winner Rankings from AP Poll

The 1998–99 Florida Gators men's basketball team represented the University of Florida in the sport of basketball during the 1998–99 college basketball season. The Gators competed in Division I of the National Collegiate Athletic Association (NCAA) and the Eastern Division of the Southeastern Conference (SEC). They were led by head coach Billy Donovan, and played their home games in the O'Connell Center on the university's Gainesville, Florida campus.

The team was the first strong team for Coach Donovan at Florida. The Gators made the Sweet Sixteen, before being upset by Gonzaga. At the end of that game, Florida guard Kenyan Weaks was called for a controversial traveling violation.

Senior captains were guard Eddie Shannon and forward Greg Stolt. The team featured freshmen Mike Miller, Teddy Dupay, and Udonis Haslem.

== Roster ==
1998–99 Florida Gators men's basketball team
Players
Coaches

Pos.	#	Name	Height	Weight	Year	Hometown
G/F	13	Mike Miller	6 ft 8 in (2.03 m)	210 lb (95 kg)	Fr	Mitchell	Mitchell, South Dakota
C	50	Udonis Haslem	6 ft 7 in (2.01 m)	240 lb (109 kg)	Fr	Miami Senior	Miami, Florida
F	24	Greg Stolt	6 ft 9 in (2.06 m)	225 lb (102 kg)	Sr	Grissom	Huntsville, Alabama
G	3	Eddie Shannon	5 ft 11 in (1.8 m)	162 lb (73 kg)	Sr	Cardinal Newman	West Palm Beach, Florida
G	5	Teddy Dupay	5 ft 11 in (1.8 m)	178 lb (81 kg)	Fr	Mariner	Ft. Myers, Florida
F	25	Major Parker	6 ft 4 in (1.93 m)	218 lb (99 kg)	So	Cardinal Gibbons	Fort Lauderdale, Florida
G	52	Kenyan Weaks	6 ft 4 in (1.93 m)	198 lb (90 kg)	Jr		Concord, North Carolina
F	00	Brent Wright	6 ft 9 in (2.06 m)	235 lb (107 kg)	So	Miami Senior	Miami, Florida

Head coach

- Billy Donovan

Assistant coach(es)

Legend

- (C) Team captain
- (S) Suspended
- (I) Ineligible
- (W) Walk-on
- Injured
- Current redshirt

Roster

== Schedule and results ==
Date time, TV	Rank^{#}	Opponent^{#}	Result	Record	Site (attendance) city, state
Regular season
Nov 16, 1998*		Georgia Southern	W 76–62	1–0	Stephen C. O'Connell Center; Gainesville, Florida
Nov 20, 1998*		at Florida State	W 82–66	2–0	Donald L. Tucker Center; Tallahassee, Florida
Nov 23, 1998*		Bethune-Cookman	W 91–61	3–0	Stephen C. O'Connell Center; Gainesville, Florida
Nov 30, 1998*		Coastal Carolina	W 110–68	4–0	Stephen C. O'Connell Center; Gainesville, Florida
Dec 5, 1998*		Charleston Southern	W 80–67	5–0	Stephen C. O'Connell Center; Gainesville, Florida
Dec 9, 1998*		at No. 3 Duke	L 86–116	5–1	Cameron Indoor Stadium; Durham, North Carolina
Dec 12, 1998*		Jacksonville	W 79–72	6–1	Stephen C. O'Connell Center; Gainesville, Florida
Dec 20, 1998*		Long Island University	W 119–61	7–1	Stephen C. O'Connell Center; Gainesville, Florida
Dec 22, 1998*		Morehead State	W 117–70	8–1	Stephen C. O'Connell Center; Gainesville, Florida
Dec 27, 1998*		vs. Michigan; Orange Bowl Basketball Classic	W 79–63	9–1	Miami Arena; Miami, Florida
Jan 2, 1999		at No. 7 Kentucky	L 58–93	9–2 (0–1)	Rupp Arena; Lexington, Kentucky
Jan 6, 1999		Vanderbilt	W 90–59	10–2 (1–1)	Stephen C. O'Connell Center; Gainesville, Florida
Jan 10, 1999		Georgia	W 72–62	11–2 (2–1)	Stephen C. O'Connell Center; Gainesville, Florida
Jan 13, 1999		at South Carolina	W 68–51	12–2 (3–1)	Carolina Coliseum; Columbia, South Carolina
Jan 16, 1999		at No. 8 Auburn	L 69–88	12–3 (3–2)	Beard-Eaves-Memorial Coliseum; Auburn, Alabama
Jan 20, 1999		at LSU	W 77–58	13–3 (4–2)	Maravich Assembly Center; Baton Rouge, Louisiana
Jan 23, 1999		Tennessee	W 93–72	14–3 (5–2)	Stephen C. O'Connell Center; Gainesville, Florida
Jan 27, 1999	No. 25	Alabama	W 72–68	15–3 (6–2)	Stephen C. O'Connell Center; Gainesville, Florida
Jan 30, 1999	No. 25	at Mississippi State	L 63–66	15–4 (6–3)	Humphrey Coliseum; Starkville, Mississippi
Feb 4, 1999		No. 5 Kentucky	W 75–68	16–4 (7–3)	Stephen C. O'Connell Center; Gainesville, Florida
Feb 6, 1999		Ole Miss	L 68–79	16–5 (7–4)	Stephen C. O'Connell Center; Gainesville, Florida
Feb 10, 1999	No. 23	at Tennessee	L 56–91	16–6 (7–5)	Thompson-Boling Arena; Knoxville, Tennessee
Feb 13, 1999	No. 23	at Georgia	W 75–64	17–6 (8–5)	Stegeman Coliseum; Athens, Georgia
Feb 16, 1999	No. 23	Arkansas	W 74–61	18–6 (9–5)	Stephen C. O'Connell Center; Gainesville, Florida
Feb 24, 1999	No. 19	South Carolina	W 89–61	19–6 (10–5)	Stephen C. O'Connell Center; Gainesville, Florida
Feb 27, 1999	No. 19	at Vanderbilt	L 70–71 ^{OT}	19–7 (10–6)	Memorial Gymnasium; Nashville, Tennessee
SEC Tournament
Mar 4, 1999*	No. 21	vs. LSU; Quarterfinal	W 97–75	20–7	Georgia Dome; Atlanta, Georgia
Mar 5, 1999*	No. 21	vs. No. 22 Arkansas; Semifinal	L 74–75	20–8	Georgia Dome; Atlanta, Georgia
NCAA Tournament
Mar 11, 1999*; 7:55 pm, CBS	(6 W) No. 23	vs. (11 W) Penn; First round	W 75–61	21–8	KeyArena; Seattle, Washington
Mar 13, 1999*; 6:56 pm, CBS	(6 W) No. 23	vs. (14 W) Weber State; Second Round	W 82–74 ^{OT}	22–8	KeyArena; Seattle, Washington
Mar 18, 1999*; 7:55 pm, CBS	(6 W) No. 23	vs. (10 W) Gonzaga; West Regional semifinal – Sweet Sixteen	L 72–73	22–9	US Airways Center; Phoenix, Arizona
*Non-conference game. ^{#}Rankings from AP poll. (#) Tournament seedings in parentheses. W=West. All times are in Eastern.
