= 1998–99 Kentucky Wildcats men's basketball team =

1998–99 season of University of Kentucky men's basketball team

1998–99 Kentucky Wildcats men's basketball
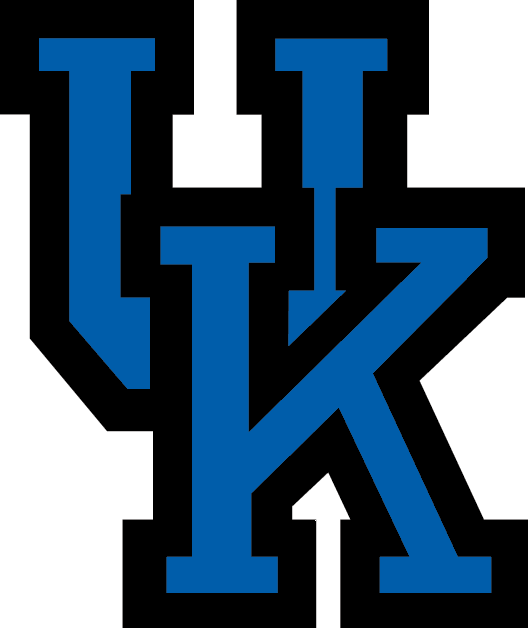

SEC tournament champions

NCAA tournament, Elite Eight
- Conference: Southeastern Conference

Ranking
- Coaches: No. 5
- AP: No. 8
- Record: 28–9 (11–5 SEC)
- Head coach: Tubby Smith (2nd season)
- Home arena: Rupp Arena

1998–99 Southeastern Conference men's basketball standings
	Conf.				Overall
Team	W		L	PCT	W		L	PCT
East
No. 20 Tennessee	12	–	4	.750	21	–	9	.700
No. 8 Kentucky †	11	–	5	.688	28	–	9	.757
No. 23 Florida	10	–	6	.625	22	–	9	.710
Georgia	6	–	10	.375	15	–	15	.500
Vanderbilt	5	–	11	.313	14	–	15	.483
South Carolina	3	–	13	.188	8	–	21	.276
West
No. 4 Auburn	14	–	2	.875	29	–	4	.879
No. 17 Arkansas	9	–	7	.563	23	–	11	.676
Ole Miss	8	–	8	.500	20	–	13	.606
Mississippi State	8	–	8	.500	20	–	13	.606
Alabama	6	–	10	.375	17	–	15	.531
LSU	4	–	12	.250	12	–	15	.444
† 1999 SEC tournament winner Rankings from AP Poll

The 1998–99 Kentucky Wildcats men's basketball team represented University of Kentucky in the 1998–99 NCAA Division I men's basketball season. The head coach was Tubby Smith who was in his second year on the sidelines. The Wildcats finished with an overall record of 28–9. (11–5 SEC)

In the 1999 NCAA Tournament Kentucky was invited as a #3 seed. The team advanced all the way to the Elite 8 before losing to Michigan State 73–66.

== Roster ==
1998–99 Kentucky Wildcats men's basketball team
Players
Coaches

Pos.	#	Name	Height	Weight	Year	Hometown
G	3	J.P. Blevins	6 ft 2 in (1.88 m)	181 lb (82 kg)	Fr	Edmonton, Kentucky
G	4	Steve Masiello	6 ft 1 in (1.85 m)	170 lb (77 kg)	Jr	White Plains, New York
G	5	Wayne Turner	6 ft 2 in (1.88 m)	190 lb (86 kg)	Sr	Boston, Massachusetts
G	11	Saul Smith	6 ft 2 in (1.88 m)	175 lb (79 kg)	So	Athens, Georgia
G	12	Todd Tackett	6 ft 2 in (1.88 m)	176 lb (80 kg)	Fr	Paintsville, Kentucky
F	14	Heshimu Evans	6 ft 6 in (1.98 m)	235 lb (107 kg)	Sr	Bronx, New York
F	21	Tayshaun Prince	6 ft 9 in (2.06 m)	260 lb (118 kg)	Fr	Compton, California
G	22	Ryan Hogan	6 ft 3 in (1.91 m)	193 lb (88 kg)	So	Deerfield, Illinois
F	25	Myron Anthony	6 ft 7 in (2.01 m)	225 lb (102 kg)	So	Neptune Beach, Florida
F	32	Desmond Allison	6 ft 5 in (1.96 m)	215 lb (98 kg)	Fr	Tampa, Florida
F/C	33	Michael Bradley	6 ft 10 in (2.08 m)	235 lb (107 kg)	So	Worcester, Massachusetts
F	34	Scott Padgett	6 ft 10 in (2.08 m)	240 lb (109 kg)	Sr	Louisville, Kentucky
F	40	Jules Camara	6 ft 11 in (2.11 m)	210 lb (95 kg)	Fr	Dakar, Senegal
C	42	Jamaal Magloire	6 ft 10 in (2.08 m)	260 lb (118 kg)	Jr	Toronto, Ontario

Head coach

- Tubby Smith

Assistant coach(es)

- Mike Sutton
- George Felton
- Shawn Finney

Legend

- (C) Team captain
- (S) Suspended
- (I) Ineligible
- (W) Walk-on
- Injured
- Current redshirt

== Schedule and results ==
Date time, TV	Rank^{#}	Opponent^{#}	Result	Record	Site city, state
Non-conference Regular season
Nov 17, 1998*; 8:00 p.m., UKTV	No. 4	Eastern Kentucky	W 99–64	1–0	Rupp Arena; Lexington, Kentucky
Nov 19, 1998*; 8:00 p.m., UKTV	No. 4	Mercer	W 82–51	2–0	Rupp Arena; Lexington, Kentucky
Nov 23, 1998*; 8:00 p.m., UKTV	No. 4	vs. Wright State	W 97–75	3–0	Riverfront Coliseum; Cincinnati, Ohio
Nov 26, 1998*	No. 4	vs. Colorado	W 64–52	4–0	Eugene Guerra Sports Complex; San Juan, Puerto Rico
Nov 27, 1998*	No. 4	vs. Pittsburgh	L 56–68	4–1	Eugene Guerra Sports Complex; San Juan, Puerto Rico
Nov 28, 1998*	No. 4	vs. No. 10 UCLA	W 66–62	5–1	Eugene Guerra Sports Complex; San Juan, Puerto Rico
Dec 1, 1998*; 9:30 p.m., ESPN	No. 8	vs. No. 7 Kansas; Great Eight	W 63–45	6–1	United Center; Chicago, Illinois
Dec 5, 1998*; 3:45 p.m., CBS	No. 8	Miami (FL)	W 74–65	7–1	Rupp Arena; Lexington, Kentucky
Dec 8, 1998*; 7:30 p.m., ESPN	No. 5	vs. No. 11 Indiana	W 70–61 ^{OT}	8–1	Freedom Hall; Louisville, Kentucky
Dec 12, 1998*; 8:30 p.m., ESPN	No. 5	No. 2 Maryland	W 103–91	9–1	Rupp Arena; Lexington, Kentucky
Dec 19, 1998*; 7:30 p.m., ESPN	No. 3	vs. Georgia Tech	W 80–39	10–1	Georgia Dome; Atlanta, Georgia
Dec 22, 1998*; 9:00 p.m., ESPN	No. 3	vs. No. 2 Duke	L 60–71	10–2	Continental Airlines Arena; East Rutherford, New Jersey
Dec 26, 1998*; 1:00 p.m., CBS	No. 3	at Louisville	L 74–83	10–3	Freedom Hall; Louisville, Kentucky
Dec 29, 1998*; 8:00 p.m., UKTV	No. 7	Tennessee State	W 97–47	11–3	Rupp Arena; Lexington, Kentucky
SEC Regular season
Jan 2, 1999; 4:00 p.m., JP Sports	No. 7	Florida	W 93–58	12–3 (1–0)	Rupp Arena; Lexington, Kentucky
Jan 5, 1999; 9:30 p.m., ESPN		at South Carolina			Carolina Coliseum; Columbia, South Carolina
Feb 24, 1999*; 8:00 p.m., JP Sports	No. 13	Vanderbilt	W 88–63	22–7 (11–4)	Rupp Arena; Lexington, Kentucky
Feb 28, 1999; 12 Noon, CBS	No. 13	at Tennessee	L 61–68	22–8 (11–5)	Thompson-Boling Arena; Knoxville, Tennessee
SEC tournament
Mar 5, 1999*; JP Sports	No. 14	vs. Ole Miss; Quarterfinals	W 83–73	23–8	Georgia Dome; Atlanta, Georgia
Mar 6, 1999*; JP Sports	No. 14	vs. No. 4 Auburn; Semifinals	W 69–57	24–8	Georgia Dome; Atlanta, Georgia
Mar 7, 1999*; CBS	No. 14	vs. No. 22 Arkansas; Championship game	W 76–63	25–8	Georgia Dome; Atlanta, Georgia
NCAA tournament
Mar 12, 1999*	(3 MW) No. 8	vs. (14 MW) New Mexico State; First round	W 82–60	26–8	Louisiana Superdome; New Orleans, Louisiana
Mar 14, 1999*; CBS	(3 MW) No. 8	vs. (6 MW) No. 22 Kansas; Second round	W 92–88 ^{OT}	27–8	Louisiana Superdome; New Orleans, Louisiana
Mar 19, 1999*; CBS	(3 MW) No. 8	vs. (10 MW) Miami (OH); Regional Semifinal – Sweet Sixteen	W 58–43	28–8	Edward Jones Dome; St. Louis, Missouri
Mar 21, 1999*; CBS	(3 MW) No. 8	vs. (1 MW) No. 2 Michigan State; Regional Final – Elite Eight	L 66–73	28–9	Edward Jones Dome (42,519); St. Louis, Missouri
*Non-conference game. ^{#}Rankings from AP Poll. (#) Tournament seedings in parentheses. MW=Midwest.
