= 1998–99 Florida A&M Rattlers basketball team =

American college basketball season

1998–99 Florida A&M Rattlers basketball

MEAC tournament champions

NCAA tournament
- Conference: Mid-Eastern Athletic Conference
- Record: 12–19 (8–11 MEAC)
- Head coach: Mickey Clayton (3rd season)
- Home arena: Jake Gaither Gymnasium

1998–99 MEAC men's basketball standings
	Conf.				Overall
Team	W		L	PCT	W		L	PCT
South Carolina State	14	–	4	.778	17	–	12	.586
Coppin State	14	–	4	.778	15	–	14	.517
Morgan State	12	–	6	.667	14	–	14	.500
Norfolk State	11	–	7	.611	15	–	12	.556
Bethune–Cookman	10	–	9	.526	11	–	16	.407
North Carolina A&T	9	–	9	.500	13	–	15	.464
Hampton	8	–	10	.444	8	–	19	.296
Florida A&M †	8	–	11	.421	12	–	19	.387
Maryland Eastern Shore	7	–	11	.389	10	–	17	.370
Delaware State	5	–	13	.278	8	–	19	.296
Howard	2	–	16	.111	2	–	25	.074
† 1999 MEAC tournament winner Rankings from AP Poll

The 1998–99 Florida A&M Rattlers men's basketball team represented Florida A&M University during the 1998–99 NCAA Division I men's basketball season. The Rattlers, led by third-year head coach Mickey Clayton, played their home games at the Teaching Gym as members of the Mid-Eastern Athletic Conference. They finished the season 12–19, 8–11 in MEAC play to finish in 8th place in the conference regular season standings. They broke through to win four games to capture the MEAC tournament and secure the conference's automatic bid to the NCAA Tournament – the first appearance in school history. Playing as No. 16 seed in the East region, The Rattlers were defeated by No. 1 overall seed and eventual National runner-up Duke, 99–58.

== Roster ==
1998–99 Florida A&M Rattlers men's basketball team
Players
Coaches

Pos.	#	Name	Height	Weight	Year	Hometown
G		Monroe Pippins	6 ft 0 in (1.83 m)	—	Sr
		Morris Scott	—	—	So

Head coach

- Mickey Clayton

Assistant coach(es)

Legend

- (C) Team captain
- (S) Suspended
- (I) Ineligible
- (W) Walk-on
- Injured
- Current redshirt

Roster

== Schedule and results ==
Date time, TV	Rank^{#}	Opponent^{#}	Result	Record	Site (attendance) city, state
Non-conference regular season
Nov 16, 1998*		at Auburn	L 47–94	0–1	Beard–Eaves–Memorial Coliseum; Auburn, Alabama
MEAC regular season
Feb 26, 1999*		at Bethune-Cookman	W 70–68	8–18 (8–11)	Moore Gymnasium; Daytona Beach, Florida
MEAC tournament
Mar 1, 1999*		vs. Howard; First round	W 68–46	9–18	Greensboro Coliseum; Greensboro, North Carolina
Mar 3, 1999*		vs. Coppin State; Quarterfinals	W 80–69	10–18	Greensboro Coliseum; Greensboro, North Carolina
Mar 5, 1999*		vs. Morgan State; Semifinals	W 62–56	11–18	Greensboro Coliseum; Greensboro, North Carolina
Mar 6, 1999*		vs. South Carolina State; Championship game	W 64–61	12–18	Greensboro Coliseum; Greensboro, North Carolina
NCAA tournament
Mar 12, 1999*; CBS	(16 E)	vs. (1 E) No. 1 Duke; First round	L 58–99	12–19	Charlotte Coliseum (19,872); Charlotte, North Carolina
*Non-conference game. ^{#}Rankings from AP Poll. (#) Tournament seedings in parentheses. E=East. All times are in Eastern Time.
