= 1999 MEAC men's basketball tournament =

Competition in Greensboro, North Carolina

- Classification: Division I
- Season: 1998–99
- Teams: 10
- Site: Richmond Coliseum; Richmond, Virginia
- Champions: Florida A&M (2nd title)
- Winning coach: Mickey Clayton
- MVP: Monroe Pippins (Florida A&M)

1998–99 MEAC men's basketball standings
	Conf.				Overall
Team	W		L	PCT	W		L	PCT
South Carolina State	14	–	4	.778	17	–	12	.586
Coppin State	14	–	4	.778	15	–	14	.517
Morgan State	12	–	6	.667	14	–	14	.500
Norfolk State	11	–	7	.611	15	–	12	.556
Bethune–Cookman	10	–	9	.526	11	–	16	.407
North Carolina A&T	9	–	9	.500	13	–	15	.464
Hampton	8	–	10	.444	8	–	19	.296
Florida A&M †	8	–	11	.421	12	–	19	.387
Maryland Eastern Shore	7	–	11	.389	10	–	17	.370
Delaware State	5	–	13	.278	8	–	19	.296
Howard	2	–	16	.111	2	–	25	.074
† 1999 MEAC tournament winner Rankings from AP Poll

The 1999 Mid-Eastern Athletic Conference men's basketball tournament took place March 1–6, 1999, at the Richmond Coliseum in Richmond, Virginia. Florida A&M defeated South Carolina State, 64–61, in the championship game to win its fourth MEAC Tournament title. The Rattlers earned an automatic bid to the 1999 NCAA tournament as No. 16 seed in the East region. In the round of 64, Florida A&M fell to No. 1 overall seed Duke, 99–58.

== Format ==
Ten of the eleven conference members participated, with the top 6 teams receiving a bye to the quarterfinal round. After seeds 8 through 11 completed games in the first round, teams were re-seeded. The lowest remaining seed was slotted against the top seed, next lowest remaining faced the #2 seed, and third lowest remaining seed squared off against the #3 seed. Norfolk State did not participate.

== Bracket ==
First round Tuesday-Wednesday, March 1–2
8	Maryland Eastern Shore	90
9	Delaware State	75
7	Florida A&M	68
10	Howard	46

Quarterfinals; Wednesday-Thursday, March 3–4
1	South Carolina State	61
8	Maryland Eastern Shore	56
4	Bethune–Cookman	50
5	North Carolina A&T	61
3	Morgan State	67
6	Hampton	66
2	Coppin State	69
7	Florida A&M	80

Semifinals; Friday, March 5
1	South Carolina State	61
5	North Carolina A&T	58
3	Morgan State	56
7	Florida A&M	62

Final; Saturday, March 6
1	South Carolina State	61
7	Florida A&M	64
