= 1998–99 Auburn Tigers men's basketball team =

American college basketball season

1998–99 Auburn Tigers men's basketball

SEC regular season champions United Airlines Tip-off Classic champions

NCAA tournament, Sweet Sixteen
- Conference: Southeastern Conference
- West

Ranking
- Coaches: No. 7
- AP: No. 4
- Record: 29–4 (14–2 SEC)
- Head coach: Cliff Ellis (5th season)
- Captains: Bryant Smith; Doc Robinson
- Home arena: Beard–Eaves–Memorial Coliseum

1998–99 Southeastern Conference men's basketball standings
	Conf.				Overall
Team	W		L	PCT	W		L	PCT
East
No. 20 Tennessee	12	–	4	.750	21	–	9	.700
No. 8 Kentucky †	11	–	5	.688	28	–	9	.757
No. 23 Florida	10	–	6	.625	22	–	9	.710
Georgia	6	–	10	.375	15	–	15	.500
Vanderbilt	5	–	11	.313	14	–	15	.483
South Carolina	3	–	13	.188	8	–	21	.276
West
No. 4 Auburn	14	–	2	.875	29	–	4	.879
No. 17 Arkansas	9	–	7	.563	23	–	11	.676
Ole Miss	8	–	8	.500	20	–	13	.606
Mississippi State	8	–	8	.500	20	–	13	.606
Alabama	6	–	10	.375	17	–	15	.531
LSU	4	–	12	.250	12	–	15	.444
† 1999 SEC tournament winner Rankings from AP Poll

The 1998–99 Auburn Tigers men's basketball team represented Auburn University in the 1998–99 college basketball season. The team's head coach was Cliff Ellis, who was in his fifth season at Auburn. The team played their home games at Beard–Eaves–Memorial Coliseum in Auburn, Alabama. They finished the season 29–4, 14–2 in SEC play to win the SEC regular season championship. They defeated Alabama to advance to the semifinals of the SEC tournament where they lost to Kentucky. They received an at-large bid to the NCAA tournament where they defeated Winthrop and Oklahoma State to advance to the Sweet Sixteen where they lost to Ohio State.

== Previous season ==
The Tigers finished the 1997–98 season 16–14, 7–9 in SEC play. They lost to Florida in the first round of the SEC tournament. They received an invitation to the National Invitation Tournament, where they defeated Southern Miss to advance to the second round where they lost to Marquette.

== Roster ==
1998–99 Auburn Tigers men's basketball team
Players
Coaches

Pos.	#	Name	Height	Weight	Year	Previous school	Hometown
G	3	Reggie Sharp	6 ft 1 in (1.85 m)	170 lb (77 kg)	So	West Georgia	Shannon, Mississippi
F	4	Chris Porter	6 ft 7 in (2.01 m)	218 lb (99 kg)	Jr	Chipola JC	Abbeville, Alabama
G	10	Scott Pohlman	6 ft 2 in (1.88 m)	170 lb (77 kg)	So	Roswell	Roswell, Georgia
G	13	Bryant Smith	6 ft 5 in (1.96 m)	195 lb (88 kg)	Sr	Butler	Huntsville, Alabama
G	23	Daymeon Fishback	6 ft 5 in (1.96 m)	218 lb (99 kg)	Jr	Greenwood	Bowling Green, Kentucky
F	31	Mack McGadney	6 ft 7 in (2.01 m)	245 lb (111 kg)	Fr	LeFlore	Mobile, Alabama
C	34	Mamadou N'Diaye	7 ft 0 in (2.13 m)	245 lb (111 kg)	Jr	Maine Central Institute	Dakar, Senegal
G	50	Doc Robinson	6 ft 2 in (1.88 m)	185 lb (84 kg)	Jr	Selma	Selma, Alabama

Head coach

- Cliff Ellis

Assistant coach(es)

Legend

- (C) Team captain
- (S) Suspended
- (I) Ineligible
- (W) Walk-on
- Injured
- Current redshirt

Roster

== Schedule and results ==
Date time, TV	Rank^{#}	Opponent^{#}	Result	Record	High points	High rebounds	High assists	Site (attendance) city, state
Regular season
November 13, 1998*		Southeastern Louisiana	W 114–60	1–0	–	–	–	Beard–Eaves–Memorial Coliseum; Auburn, AL
November 16, 1998*		Florida A&M	W 94–47	2–0	–	–	–	Beard–Eaves–Memorial Coliseum; Auburn, AL
November 19, 1998*		UCF	W 77–42	3–0	–	–	–	Beard–Eaves–Memorial Coliseum; Auburn, AL
November 23, 1998*		BYU	W 62–43	4–0	–	–	–	Beard–Eaves–Memorial Coliseum; Auburn, AL
November 27, 1998*		vs. Rutgers; United Airlines Tip-off Classic	W 70–55	5–0	–	–	–	Stan Sheriff Center; Honolulu, HI
November 29, 1998*; KFVE-TV		at Hawaii; United Airlines Tip-off Classic	W 84–57	6–0	–	–	–	Stan Sheriff Center; Honolulu, HI
December 3, 1998*		UNC Asheville	W 91–60	7–0	–	–	–	Beard–Eaves–Memorial Coliseum; Auburn, AL
December 6, 1998*; FSS		at Florida State	W 80–68	8–0	–	–	–	Donald L. Tucker Center; Tallahassee, FL
December 12, 1998*		vs. UAB; Arby's Hardwood Classic; Rivalry	W 77–64	9–0	–	–	–	BJCC Coliseum; Birmingham, AL
December 15, 1998*; CSS	No. 19	Wofford	W 79–51	10–0	–	–	–	Beard–Eaves–Memorial Coliseum; Auburn, AL
December 19, 1998*; Foxnet	No. 19	at Navy	W 88–70	11–0	–	–	–	Alumni Hall; Annapolis, MD
December 29, 1998*; CSS	No. 17	Bethune–Cookman	W 99–46	12–0	–	–	–	Beard–Eaves–Memorial Coliseum; Auburn, AL
January 2, 1999; CSS	No. 17	Tennessee	W 90–62	13–0 (1–0)	–	–	–	Beard–Eaves–Memorial Coliseum; Auburn, AL
January 6, 1999; JP	No. 14	No. 19 Arkansas	W 83–66	14–0 (2–0)	–	–	–	Beard–Eaves–Memorial Coliseum; Auburn, AL
January 9, 1999	No. 14	at LSU	W 73–70	15–0 (3–0)	–	–	–	Pete Maravich Assembly Center; Baton Rouge, LA
January 13, 1999	No. 8	at Ole Miss	W 74–59	16–0 (4–0)	–	–	–	Tad Smith Coliseum; Oxford, MS
January 16, 1999; CBS	No. 8	Florida	W 88–69	17–0 (5–0)	–	–	–	Beard–Eaves–Memorial Coliseum; Auburn, AL
January 20, 1999; JP	No. 6	at No. 7 Kentucky	L 62–72	17–1 (5–1)	–	–	–	Rupp Arena; Lexington, KY
January 23, 1999; CSS	No. 6	at Alabama; Rivalry	W 73–58	18–1 (6–1)	–	–	–	Coleman Coliseum; Tuscaloosa, AL
January 27, 1999; CSS	No. 7	Mississippi State	W 64–54	19–1 (7–1)	–	–	–	Beard–Eaves–Memorial Coliseum; Auburn, AL
January 30, 1999; JP	No. 7	at Georgia	W 85–74	20–1 (8–1)	–	–	–	Stegeman Coliseum; Athens, GA
February 3, 1999	No. 6	at South Carolina	W 76–48	21–1 (9–1)	–	–	–	Carolina Coliseum; Columbia, SC
February 6, 1999; FSS	No. 6	LSU	W 80–54	22–1 (10–1)	–	–	–	Beard–Eaves–Memorial Coliseum; Auburn, AL
February 9, 1999; ESPN	No. 3	Ole Miss	W 95–66	23–1 (11–1)	–	–	–	Beard–Eaves–Memorial Coliseum; Auburn, AL
February 13, 1999; CSS	No. 3	Alabama; Rivalry	W 102–61	24–1 (12–1)	–	–	–	Beard–Eaves–Memorial Coliseum; Auburn, AL
February 17, 1999	No. 3	Vanderbilt	W 81–63	25–1 (13–1)	–	–	–	Beard–Eaves–Memorial Coliseum; Auburn, AL
February 24, 1999; JP	No. 2	at Arkansas	L 88–104	25–2 (13–2)	–	–	–	Bud Walton Arena; Fayetteville, AR
February 27, 1999	No. 2	at Mississippi State	W 76–73	26–2 (14–2)	–	–	–	Humphrey Coliseum; Starkville, MS
SEC tournament
March 5, 1999; JP	(W1) No. 4	vs. (W5) Alabama; Quarterfinals	W 93–61	27–2	–	–	–	Georgia Dome; Atlanta, GA
March 6, 1999; JP	(W1) No. 4	vs. (E2) No. 14 Kentucky; Semifinals	L 57–69	27–3	–	–	–	Georgia Dome; Atlanta, GA
NCAA tournament
March 11, 1999*; CBS	(1) No. 4	vs. (16) Winthrop; First Round	W 80–41	28–3	14 – Tied	10 – N'diaye	4 – Tied	RCA Dome (27,184); Indianapolis, IN
March 13, 1999*; CBS	(1) No. 4	vs. (9) Oklahoma State; Second Round	W 81–74	29–3	28 – Pohlman	10 – Porter	3 – Robinson	RCA Dome (30,318); Indianapolis, IN
March 18, 1999*; CBS	(1) No. 4	vs. (4) No. 14 Ohio State; Sweet Sixteen	L 64–72	29–4	15 – Porter	11 – Tied	6 – Robinson	Thompson–Boling Arena (23,898); Knoxville, TN
*Non-conference game. ^{#}Rankings from AP Poll. (#) Tournament seedings in parentheses. All times are in Central Time.

== Rankings ==
Ranking movements Legend: ██ Increase in ranking ██ Decrease in ranking — = Not ranked
	Week																		
Poll	Pre	1	2	3	4	5	6	7	8	9	10	11	12	13	14	15	16	17	Final
AP	—	—	—	—	—	19	18	17	14	8	6	7	6	3	3	2	4	4	Not released
Coaches	—	—*	—	—	24	18	17	15	14	9	6	7	7	3	3	2	4	4	7

*AP does not release post-NCAA Tournament rankings.

== Awards and honors ==
- Chris Porter – SEC Men's Player of the Year
