= 1998–99 Tennessee Volunteers basketball team =

American college basketball season

1998–99 Tennessee Volunteers basketball

SEC Regular season champions SEC East champions

NCAA tournament, second round
- Conference: Southeastern Conference
- East

Ranking
- AP: No. 20
- Record: 21–9 (12–4 SEC)
- Head coach: Jerry Green (2nd season)
- Home arena: Thompson–Boling Arena

1998–99 Southeastern Conference men's basketball standings
	Conf.				Overall
Team	W		L	PCT	W		L	PCT
East
No. 20 Tennessee	12	–	4	.750	21	–	9	.700
No. 8 Kentucky †	11	–	5	.688	28	–	9	.757
No. 23 Florida	10	–	6	.625	22	–	9	.710
Georgia	6	–	10	.375	15	–	15	.500
Vanderbilt	5	–	11	.313	14	–	15	.483
South Carolina	3	–	13	.188	8	–	21	.276
West
No. 4 Auburn	14	–	2	.875	29	–	4	.879
No. 17 Arkansas	9	–	7	.563	23	–	11	.676
Ole Miss	8	–	8	.500	20	–	13	.606
Mississippi State	8	–	8	.500	20	–	13	.606
Alabama	6	–	10	.375	17	–	15	.531
LSU	4	–	12	.250	12	–	15	.444
† 1999 SEC tournament winner Rankings from AP Poll

The 1998–99 Tennessee Volunteers basketball team represented the University of Tennessee during the 1998–99 NCAA Division I men's basketball season. The team was led by second-year head coach Jerry Green, and played their home games at Thompson–Boling Arena in Knoxville, Tennessee as a member of the Southeastern Conference. After finishing first in the SEC East regular season standings with a 12–4 conference record, they were invited to the NCAA tournament where they reached the second round.

== Roster ==
1998–99 Tennessee Volunteers men's basketball team
Players
Coaches

Pos.	#	Name	Height	Weight	Year	Previous school	Hometown
G	15	Brandon Wharton	6 ft 3 in (1.91 m)	—	Sr	Nashville, Tennessee
F	22	Vincent Yarbrough	6 ft 7 in (2.01 m)	—	Fr	Cleveland	Cleveland, Tennessee
F	55	Charles Hathaway	6 ft 10 in (2.08 m)	—	Jr	Hillwood	Nashville, Tennessee

Head coach

- Jerry Green

Assistant coach(es)

Legend

- (C) Team captain
- (S) Suspended
- (I) Ineligible
- (W) Walk-on
- Injured
- Current redshirt

Roster

== Schedule and results ==
Date time, TV	Rank^{#}	Opponent^{#}	Result	Record	Site (attendance) city, state
Non-conference Regular season
Nov 13, 1998*	No. 9	vs. No. 18 Arizona	L 72–73	0–1	University Arena; Albuquerque, New Mexico
Nov 15, 1998*	No. 9	Tennessee State	W 91–69	1–1	Thompson-Boling Arena; Knoxville, Tennessee
Nov 17, 1998*	No. 18	Cal State Northridge	W 83–64	2–1	Thompson-Boling Arena; Knoxville, Tennessee
Nov 19, 1998*	No. 18	at Miami (OH)	L 62–68	2–2	Millett Hall; Oxford, Ohio
Nov 24, 1998*	No. 25	Chattanooga	W 85–74	3–2	Thompson-Boling Arena; Knoxville, Tennessee
Nov 30, 1998*	No. 25	Western Carolina	W 84–41	4–2	Thompson-Boling Arena; Knoxville, Tennessee
Dec 2, 1998*		Memphis	W 68–67	5–2	Thompson-Boling Arena; Knoxville, Tennessee
Dec 6, 1998*		No. 20 Pittsburgh	W 56–53	6–2	Thompson-Boling Arena; Knoxville, Tennessee
Dec 10, 1998*		at Saint Joseph's	L 53–55	6–3	Alumni Memorial Fieldhouse; Philadelphia, Pennsylvania
Dec 19, 1998*		at South Florida	W 75–68 ^{OT}	7–3	Sun Dome; Tampa, Florida
Dec 22, 1998*		UNC Greensboro	W 92–60	8–3	Thompson-Boling Arena; Knoxville, Tennessee
SEC Regular season
Jan 2, 1999		at No. 17 Auburn	L 62–90	8–4 (0–1)	Beard–Eaves–Memorial Coliseum; Auburn, Alabama
Jan 6, 1999		LSU	W 93–58	9–4 (1–1)	Thompson-Boling Arena; Knoxville, Tennessee
Jan 9, 1999		South Carolina	W 86–57	10–4 (2–1)	Thompson-Boling Arena; Knoxville, Tennessee
Jan 12, 1999; ESPN		at No. 6 Kentucky	W 47–46	11–4 (3–1)	Rupp Arena; Lexington, Kentucky
Jan 20, 1999*		Georgia	W 85–69	12–4 (4–1)	Thompson-Boling Arena; Knoxville, Tennessee
Jan 23, 1999		at Florida	L 72–93	12–5 (4–2)	O'Connell Center; Gainesville, Florida
Jan 27, 1999		at Vanderbilt	W 78–67	13–5 (5–2)	Memorial Gymnasium; Nashville, Tennessee
Jan 30, 1999		Alabama	W 100–64	14–5 (6–2)	Thompson-Boling Arena; Knoxville, Tennessee
Feb 2, 1999		at No. 23 Arkansas	L 52–69	14–6 (6–3)	Bud Walton Arena; Fayetteville, Arkansas
Feb 6, 1999		Mississippi State	L 82–88	14–7 (6–4)	Thompson-Boling Arena; Knoxville, Tennessee
Feb 10, 1999		No. 23 Florida	W 91–56	15–7 (7–4)	Thompson-Boling Arena; Knoxville, Tennessee
Feb 13, 1999		Vanderbilt	W 63–62	16–7 (8–4)	Thompson-Boling Arena; Knoxville, Tennessee
Feb 17, 1999		at Ole Miss	W 69–67	17–7 (9–4)	Tad Smith Coliseum; Oxford, Mississippi
Feb 20, 1999		at South Carolina	W 65–50	18–7 (10–4)	Carolina Coliseum; Columbia, South Carolina
Feb 23, 1999		at Georgia	W 75–65	19–7 (11–4)	Stegeman Coliseum; Athens, Georgia
Feb 28, 1999; CBS		No. 13 Kentucky	W 68–61	20–7 (12–4)	Thompson-Boling Arena; Knoxville, Tennessee
SEC tournament
Mar 5, 1999*; JP	No. 18	vs. Mississippi State; Quarterfinals	L 56–62	20–8	Georgia Dome; Atlanta, Georgia
NCAA tournament
Mar 12, 1999*; CBS	(4 E) No. 20	vs. (13 E) Delaware; First Round	W 62–52	21–8	Charlotte Coliseum; Charlotte, North Carolina
Mar 14, 1999*; CBS	(4 E) No. 20	vs. (12 E) SW Missouri State; Second Round	L 51–81	21–9	Charlotte Coliseum; Charlotte, North Carolina
*Non-conference game. ^{#}Rankings from AP poll. (#) Tournament seedings in parentheses. E=East. All times are in Eastern Time.
