= 1998–99 Arkansas Razorbacks men's basketball team =

American college basketball season

1998–99 Arkansas Razorbacks men's basketball

NCAA tournament, Round of 32
- Conference: Southeastern Conference
- West

Ranking
- Coaches: No. 25
- AP: No. 17
- Record: 23–11 (9–7 SEC)
- Head coach: Nolan Richardson (14th season)
- Home arena: Bud Walton Arena

1998–99 Southeastern Conference men's basketball standings
	Conf.				Overall
Team	W		L	PCT	W		L	PCT
East
No. 20 Tennessee	12	–	4	.750	21	–	9	.700
No. 8 Kentucky †	11	–	5	.688	28	–	9	.757
No. 23 Florida	10	–	6	.625	22	–	9	.710
Georgia	6	–	10	.375	15	–	15	.500
Vanderbilt	5	–	11	.313	14	–	15	.483
South Carolina	3	–	13	.188	8	–	21	.276
West
No. 4 Auburn	14	–	2	.875	29	–	4	.879
No. 17 Arkansas	9	–	7	.563	23	–	11	.676
Ole Miss	8	–	8	.500	20	–	13	.606
Mississippi State	8	–	8	.500	20	–	13	.606
Alabama	6	–	10	.375	17	–	15	.531
LSU	4	–	12	.250	12	–	15	.444
† 1999 SEC tournament winner Rankings from AP Poll

The 1998–99 Arkansas Razorbacks men's basketball team represented the University of Arkansas in the 1998–99 college basketball season. The head coach was Nolan Richardson, serving for his 14th year. The team played its home games in Bud Walton Arena in Fayetteville, Arkansas.

== Roster ==
1998–99 Arkansas Razorbacks men's basketball team
Players
Coaches

Pos.	#	Name	Height	Weight	Year	Previous school	Hometown
G/F	15	Chris Jefferies	6 ft 8 in (2.03 m)	212 lb (96 kg)	Fr	Washington Union	Fresno, California
G	22	Pat Bradley	6 ft 2 in (1.88 m)	196 lb (89 kg)	Sr	Everett	Everett, Massachusetts
PF	55	Derek Hood	6 ft 8 in (2.03 m)	220 lb (100 kg)	Sr	Central	Kansas City, Missouri

Head coach

- Nolan Richardson

Assistant coach(es)

Legend

- (C) Team captain
- (S) Suspended
- (I) Ineligible
- (W) Walk-on
- Injured
- Current redshirt

== Schedule and results ==
Date time, TV	Rank^{#}	Opponent^{#}	Result	Record	Site city, state
Regular Season
Nov 15, 1998*		Jackson State	W 83–72	1–0	Bud Walton Arena; Fayetteville, Arkansas
Nov 17, 1998*		Alabama State	W 73–43	2–0	Bud Walton Arena; Fayetteville, Arkansas
Nov 20, 1998*		vs. Virginia; Top of the World Classic	W 85–83	3–0	Carlson Center; Fairbanks, Alaska
Nov 21, 1998*		vs. New Mexico State; Top of the World Classic	W 66–60	4–0	Carlson Center; Fairbanks, Alaska
Nov 22, 1998*		vs. Villanova; Top of the World Classic	L 63–76	4–1	Carlson Center; Fairbanks, Alaska
SEC Tournament
Mar 5, 1999*	No. 22	vs. No. 21 Florida; Quarterfinals	W 75–74	21–9	Georgia Dome; Atlanta, Georgia
Mar 6, 1999*	No. 22	vs. Mississippi State; Semifinals	W 84–79 ^{OT}	22–9	Georgia Dome; Atlanta, Georgia
Mar 7, 1999*	No. 22	vs. No. 14 Kentucky; Championship Game	L 63–76	22–10	Georgia Dome; Atlanta, Georgia
NCAA Tournament
Mar 11, 1999*	(4 W) No. 22	vs. (13 W) Siena; First Round	W 94–80	23–10	McNichols Sports Arena; Denver, Colorado
Mar 13, 1999*	(4 W) No. 22	vs. (5 W) No. 21 Iowa; Second Round	L 72–82	23–11	McNichols Sports Arena; Denver, Colorado
*Non-conference game. ^{#}Rankings from AP Poll. (#) Tournament seedings in parentheses. W=West.
