= 1999 SEC men's basketball tournament =

- Classification: Division I
- Season: 1998–99
- Teams: 12
- Site: Georgia Dome; Atlanta, Georgia (USA)
- Champions: Kentucky (23rd title)
- Winning coach: Tubby Smith (2nd title)
- MVP: Scott Padgett (Kentucky)
- Attendance: 172,027
- Television: Jefferson Pilot Sports (1st Round, Quarterfinals, Semifinals); CBS (Championship game)

1998–99 Southeastern Conference men's basketball standings
	Conf.				Overall
Team	W		L	PCT	W		L	PCT
East
No. 20 Tennessee	12	–	4	.750	21	–	9	.700
No. 8 Kentucky †	11	–	5	.688	28	–	9	.757
No. 23 Florida	10	–	6	.625	22	–	9	.710
Georgia	6	–	10	.375	15	–	15	.500
Vanderbilt	5	–	11	.313	14	–	15	.483
South Carolina	3	–	13	.188	8	–	21	.276
West
No. 4 Auburn	14	–	2	.875	29	–	4	.879
No. 17 Arkansas	9	–	7	.563	23	–	11	.676
Ole Miss	8	–	8	.500	20	–	13	.606
Mississippi State	8	–	8	.500	20	–	13	.606
Alabama	6	–	10	.375	17	–	15	.531
LSU	4	–	12	.250	12	–	15	.444
† 1999 SEC tournament winner Rankings from AP Poll

The 1999 SEC Men’s Basketball Tournament took place from March 4–7, 1999 at the Georgia Dome in Atlanta, Georgia. The Kentucky Wildcats men's basketball team won the tournament and the SEC’s automatic bid to the 1999 NCAA Men’s Division I Basketball Tournament by defeating the Arkansas Razorbacks by a score of 76–63.

== Television coverage ==
The first round, the quarterfinals, and the semifinals were regionally televised and syndicated by Jefferson Pilot Sports, in its 13th season in syndicating SEC Basketball games. The championship game was televised nationally on CBS.

== Tournament notes ==
- This was Tubby Smith’s second SEC tournament title win as the head coach of the Kentucky Wildcats men’s basketball team.

== Bracket ==
First round
E5	Vanderbilt	58
W4	Mississippi State	76
W6	LSU	75
E3	#21 Florida	97
W5	Alabama	65
E4	Georgia	57
E6	South Carolina	60
W3	Mississippi	64

Second Round
E1	#18 Tennessee	58
W4	Mississippi State	62
W2	#22 Arkansas	75
E3	#21 Florida	74
W1	#4 Auburn	93
W5	Alabama	61
E2	#14 Kentucky	83
W3	Mississippi	73

Semifinals
W4	Mississippi State	79
W2	#22 Arkansas	84
W1	#4 Auburn	57
E2	#14 Kentucky	69

Championship game
W2	#22 Arkansas	63
E2	#14 Kentucky	76
