= 1998–99 NCAA Division I men's basketball season =

Basketball season

- Preseason AP No. 1: Duke Blue Devils
- Regular season: November 1998 – March 1999
- NCAA Tournament: 1999
- Tournament dates: March 11 – 29, 1999
- National Championship: Tropicana Field; St. Petersburg, Florida
- NCAA Champions: Connecticut Huskies
- Other champions: California Golden Bears (NIT)
- Player of the Year (Naismith, Wooden): Elton Brand, Duke Blue Devils

The 1998–99 NCAA Division I men's basketball season began in November 1998 and concluded with the 64-team 1999 NCAA Division I men's basketball tournament, whose finals were held at Tropicana Field in St. Petersburg, Florida. The Connecticut Huskies earned their first national championship by defeating the Duke Blue Devils, 77–74, on March 29, 1999. They were coached by Jim Calhoun, and the NCAA basketball tournament Most Outstanding Player was Richard Hamilton.

In the 32-team 1999 National Invitation Tournament, the California Golden Bears defeated the Clemson Tigers at the Madison Square Garden in New York City.

Following the season, the 1999 NCAA Men's Basketball All-American Consensus First Team included Elton Brand, Mateen Cleaves, Richard Hamilton, Andre Miller and Jason Terry. The consensus second team was composed of Evan Eschmeyer, Steve Francis, Trajan Langdon, Chris Porter, and Wally Szczerbiak.

== Season headlines ==
- The preseason AP All-American team was named on November 10. Richard Hamilton of Connecticut was the leading vote-getter (66 of 72 votes). The rest of the team included Mateen Cleaves of Michigan State (58 votes), Elton Brand of Duke (55), Lee Nailon of TCU (50) and Andre Miller of Utah (44).

== Conference membership changes ==
These schools joined new conferences for the 1998–99 season.

School	Former conference	New conference
Alabama A&M Bulldogs	SIAC (D-II)	Southwestern Athletic Conference
Buffalo Bulls	Mid-Continent Conference	Mid-American Conference
College of Charleston Cougars	Trans America Athletic Conference	Southern Conference
Denver Pioneers	NCAA Division II Independent	NCAA Division I Independent
Florida International (FIU) Panthers	Trans America Athletic Conference	Sun Belt Conference
IUPUI Jaguars	NCAA Division II Independent	Mid-Continent Conference
Jacksonville Dolphins	Sun Belt Conference	Trans America Athletic Conference
Lamar Cardinals	Sun Belt Conference	Southland Conference
UMBC Retrievers	Big South Conference	Northeast Conference
Northeastern Illinois Golden Eagles	Mid-Continent Conference	Discontinued athletic programs
Quinnipiac Bobcats	Northeast-10 Conference (D-II)	Northeast Conference
Texas–Pan American Broncs	Sun Belt Conference	NCAA Division I Independent

== Season outlook ==
=== Pre-season polls ===
The top 25 from the AP Poll November 6, 1998 and the ESPN/USA Today Poll November 5, 1998.

'Associated Press'
Ranking	Team
1	Duke (34)
2	Connecticut (25)
3	Stanford (12)
4	Kentucky (1)
5	Michigan State
6	Maryland
7	Temple
8	Kansas
9	Tennessee
10	Utah
11	North Carolina
12	UCLA
13	Oklahoma State
14	Washington
15	Cincinnati
16	Purdue
17	Xavier
18	Arizona
19	Arkansas
20	New Mexico
20	Syracuse
22	Indiana
23	Rhode Island
24	Massachusetts
25	TCU

ESPN/USA Today Coaches
Ranking	Team
1	Duke (22)
2	Stanford (3)
3	Connecticut (4)
4	Michigan State
5	Maryland
6	Kentucky (1)
7	Temple
8	Kansas
9	Tennessee
10	Xavier
11	North Carolina
12	Utah
13	UCLA
14	Washington
15	Cincinnati
16	Purdue
17	Indiana
18	Oklahoma State
19	Arkansas
20	Arizona
21	New Mexico
22	Syracuse
23	Massachusetts
24	TCU
25	Rhode Island

== Regular season ==
=== Conferences ===
==== Conference winners and tournaments ====
Twenty-eight conferences concluded their seasons with a single-elimination tournament, with only the Ivy League and Pacific-10 Conference choosing not to conduct conference tournaments. Most conference tournament winners received an automatic bid to the 1999 NCAA Division I men's basketball tournament.

Conference	Regular season winner	Conference player of the year	Conference tournament	Tournament venue (City)	Tournament winner
America East Conference	Delaware & Drexel	Mike Pegues, Delaware	1999 America East men's basketball tournament	Bob Carpenter Center (Newark, Delaware) (Except Finals)	Delaware
Atlantic 10 Conference	Temple (East); George Washington (West)	Shawnta Rogers, George Washington	1999 Atlantic 10 men's basketball tournament	The Spectrum (Philadelphia, Pennsylvania)	Rhode Island
Atlantic Coast Conference	Duke	Elton Brand, Duke	1999 ACC men's basketball tournament	Charlotte Coliseum (Charlotte, North Carolina)	Duke
Big 12 Conference	Texas	Venson Hamilton, Nebraska	1999 Big 12 men's basketball tournament	Kemper Arena (Kansas City, Missouri)	Kansas
Big East Conference	Connecticut	Richard Hamilton, Connecticut & Tim James, Miami (Florida)	1999 Big East men's basketball tournament	Madison Square Garden (New York City, New York)	Connecticut
Big Sky Conference	Weber State	Harold Arceneaux, Weber State	1999 Big Sky men's basketball tournament	Dee Events Center (Ogden, Utah)	Weber State
Big South Conference	Winthrop	Kevin Martin, UNC Asheville	1999 Big South Conference men's basketball tournament	Asheville Civic Center (Asheville, North Carolina)	Winthrop
Big Ten Conference	Michigan State	Mateen Cleaves, Michigan State (Coaches); Scoonie Penn, Ohio State (Media)	1999 Big Ten Conference men's basketball tournament	United Center (Chicago, Illinois)	Michigan State
Big West Conference	Boise State & New Mexico State (Eastern); UC Santa Barbara (Western)	Roberto Bergersen, Boise State	1999 Big West Conference men's basketball tournament	Lawlor Events Center (Reno, Nevada)	New Mexico State
Colonial Athletic Association	George Mason	George Evans, George Mason	1999 CAA men's basketball tournament	Richmond Coliseum (Richmond, Virginia)	George Mason
Conference USA	Cincinnati (American); UAB (National)	Quentin Richardson, DePaul	1999 Conference USA men's basketball tournament	Birmingham–Jefferson Convention Complex (Birmingham, Alabama)	Charlotte
Ivy League	Penn	Brian Earl, Princeton	No Tournament		
Metro Atlantic Athletic Conference	Niagara & Siena	Alvin Young, Niagara	1999 MAAC men's basketball tournament	Marine Midland Arena (Buffalo, New York)	Siena
Mid-American Conference	Miami (Ohio) (East); Toledo (West)	Wally Szczerbiak, Miami (Ohio)	1999 MAC men's basketball tournament	SeaGate Convention Centre (Toledo, Ohio)	Kent State
Mid-Continent Conference	Valparaiso	Chad Wilkerson, Oral Roberts	1999 Mid-Continent Conference men's basketball tournament	The MARK of the Quad Cities (Moline, Illinois)	Valparaiso
Mid-Eastern Athletic Conference	Coppin State & South Carolina State	Damian Woolfolk, Norfolk State	1999 Mid-Eastern Athletic Conference men's basketball tournament	Richmond Coliseum (Richmond, Virginia)	Florida A&M
Midwestern Collegiate Conference	Detroit	Jermaine Jackson, Detroit	1999 Midwestern Collegiate Conference men's basketball tournament	UIC Pavilion (Chicago, Illinois)	Detroit
Missouri Valley Conference	Evansville	Marcus Wilson, Evansville	1999 Missouri Valley Conference men's basketball tournament	Savvis Center (St. Louis, Missouri)	Creighton
Northeast Conference	UMBC	Ray Minlend, St. Francis (NY)	1999 Northeast Conference men's basketball tournament	Spiro Sports Center (Staten Island, New York)	Mount St. Mary's
Ohio Valley Conference	Murray State	Bud Eley, Southeast Missouri State	1999 Ohio Valley Conference men's basketball tournament	Gaylord Entertainment Center (Nashville, Tennessee) (Semifinals and Finals)	Murray State
Pacific-10 Conference	Stanford	Jason Terry, Arizona	No Tournament		
Patriot League	Lafayette	Brian Ehlers, Lafayette	1999 Patriot League men's basketball tournament	Kirby Sports Center (Easton, Pennsylvania)	Lafayette
Southeastern Conference	Tennessee (East); Auburn (West)	Chris Porter, Auburn	1999 SEC men's basketball tournament	Georgia Dome (Atlanta, Georgia)	Kentucky
Southern Conference	Appalachian State (North); College of Charleston (South)	Sedric Webber, College of Charleston	1999 Southern Conference men's basketball tournament	Greensboro Coliseum (Greensboro, North Carolina)	College of Charleston
Southland Conference	UTSA	Donte Mathis, Texas State	1999 Southland Conference men's basketball tournament	Hirsch Memorial Coliseum (Shreveport, Louisiana) (Semifinals & Finals)	UTSA
Southwestern Athletic Conference	Alcorn State	Adarrial Smylie, Southern	1999 Southwestern Athletic Conference men's basketball tournament	F. G. Clark Center (Baton Rouge, Louisiana)	Alcorn State
Sun Belt Conference	Louisiana Tech	Chico Fletcher, Arkansas State	1999 Sun Belt Conference men's basketball tournament	Cajundome (Lafayette, Louisiana)	Arkansas State
Trans America Athletic Conference	Samford	Reed Rawlings, Samford	1999 TAAC men's basketball tournament	Memorial Coliseum (Jacksonville, Florida)	Samford
West Coast Conference	Gonzaga	Eric Schraeder, Saint Mary's	1999 West Coast Conference men's basketball tournament	Toso Pavilion (Santa Clara, California)	Gonzaga
Western Athletic Conference	UNLV & Tulsa (Mountain); Utah (Pacific)	Andre Miller, Utah (Mountain); Jeryl Sasser, SMU (Pacific)	1999 WAC men's basketball tournament	Thomas & Mack Center (Las Vegas, Nevada)	Utah

==== Conference standings ====
1998–99 America East Conference men's basketball standings
	Conf.				Overall
Team	W		L	PCT	W		L	PCT
Delaware †	15	–	3	.833	25	–	6	.806
Drexel	15	–	3	.833	20	–	9	.690
Hofstra	14	–	4	.778	22	–	10	.688
Maine	13	–	5	.722	19	–	9	.679
Hartford	9	–	9	.500	11	–	16	.407
Vermont	7	–	11	.389	11	–	16	.407
Northeastern	6	–	12	.333	10	–	18	.357
Boston University	5	–	13	.278	9	–	18	.333
Towson	4	–	14	.222	6	–	22	.214
New Hampshire	2	–	16	.111	4	–	23	.148
† 1999 America East tournament winner Rankings from AP poll

1998–99 ACC men's basketball standings
	Conf.				Overall
Team	W		L	PCT	W		L	PCT
No. 1 Duke †	16	–	0	1.000	37	–	2	.949
No. 5 Maryland	13	–	3	.813	28	–	6	.824
No. 13 North Carolina	10	–	6	.625	24	–	10	.706
Wake Forest	7	–	9	.438	17	–	14	.548
NC State	6	–	10	.375	19	–	14	.576
Georgia Tech	6	–	10	.375	15	–	16	.484
Clemson	5	–	11	.313	20	–	15	.571
Florida State	5	–	11	.313	13	–	17	.433
Virginia	4	–	12	.250	14	–	16	.467
† 1999 ACC tournament winner Rankings from AP Poll

1998–99 Atlantic 10 men's basketball standings
	Conf.				Overall
Team	W		L	PCT	W		L	PCT
East
Temple	13	–	3	.813	24	–	11	.686
Rhode Island †	10	–	6	.625	20	–	13	.606
UMass	9	–	7	.563	14	–	16	.467
St. Bonaventure	8	–	8	.500	14	–	15	.483
Fordham	5	–	11	.313	12	–	15	.444
Saint Joseph's	5	–	11	.313	12	–	18	.400
West
George Washington	13	–	3	.813	20	–	9	.690
Xavier	12	–	4	.750	25	–	11	.694
La Salle	8	–	8	.500	13	–	15	.464
Virginia Tech	7	–	9	.438	13	–	15	.464
Dayton	5	–	11	.313	11	–	17	.393
Duquesne	1	–	15	.063	5	–	23	.179
† 1999 Atlantic 10 Tournament winner Rankings from AP poll

1998–99 Big 12 men's basketball standings
	Conf.				Overall
Team	W		L	PCT	W		L	PCT
Texas	13	–	3	.813	19	–	13	.594
Missouri	11	–	5	.688	20	–	9	.690
No. 22 Kansas †	11	–	5	.688	23	–	10	.697
Oklahoma	11	–	5	.688	22	–	11	.667
Oklahoma State	10	–	6	.625	23	–	11	.676
Nebraska	10	–	6	.625	20	–	13	.606
Kansas State	7	–	9	.438	20	–	13	.606
Colorado	7	–	9	.438	18	–	15	.545
Iowa State	6	–	10	.375	15	–	15	.500
Texas A&M	5	–	11	.313	12	–	15	.444
Texas Tech	5	–	11	.313	13	–	17	.433
Baylor	0	–	16	.000	6	–	24	.200
† 1999 Big 12 Tournament winner Rankings from AP poll

1998–99 Big East men's basketball standings
	Conf.				Overall
Team	W		L	PCT	W		L	PCT
No. 3 Connecticut†	16	–	2	.889	34	–	2	.944
No. 10 Miami (FL)	15	–	3	.833	23	–	7	.767
No. 9 St. John's	14	–	4	.778	28	–	9	.757
Syracuse	10	–	8	.556	21	–	12	.636
Villanova	10	–	8	.556	21	–	11	.656
Rutgers	9	–	9	.500	19	–	13	.594
Providence	9	–	9	.500	16	–	14	.533
Notre Dame	8	–	10	.444	14	–	16	.467
Seton Hall	8	–	10	.444	15	–	15	.500
Georgetown	6	–	12	.333	15	–	16	.484
Pittsburgh	5	–	13	.278	14	–	16	.467
West Virginia	4	–	14	.222	10	–	19	.345
Boston College	3	–	15	.167	6	–	21	.222
† 1999 Big East tournament winner As of March 29, 1999; Rankings from AP Poll

1998–99 Big Sky men's basketball standings
	Conf.				Overall
Team	W		L	PCT	W		L	PCT
Weber State †	13	–	3	.813	25	–	8	.758
Northern Arizona	12	–	4	.750	21	–	8	.724
Portland State	9	–	7	.563	17	–	11	.607
Cal State Northridge	9	–	7	.563	17	–	12	.586
Montana State	9	–	7	.563	16	–	13	.552
Eastern Washington	7	–	9	.438	10	–	17	.370
Montana	6	–	10	.375	13	–	14	.481
Idaho State	4	–	12	.250	6	–	20	.231
Sacramento State	3	–	13	.188	3	–	23	.115
† Conference tournament winner

1998–99 Big South Conference men's basketball standings
	Conf.				Overall
Team	W		L	PCT	W		L	PCT
Winthrop †	9	–	1	.900	21	–	8	.724
Radford	8	–	2	.800	20	–	8	.714
UNC Asheville	5	–	5	.500	11	–	18	.379
Charleston Southern	4	–	6	.400	12	–	16	.429
Coastal Carolina	4	–	6	.400	7	–	20	.259
Liberty	0	–	10	.000	4	–	23	.148
† 1999 Big South tournament winner Rankings from AP Poll

1998–99 Big Ten Conference men's basketball standings
	Conf.				Overall
Team	W		L	PCT	W		L	PCT
No. 2 Michigan State†	15	–	1	.938	33	–	5	.868
No. 19 Indiana	9	–	7	.563	23	–	11	.676
No. 18 Wisconsin	9	–	7	.563	22	–	10	.688
No. 21 Iowa	9	–	7	.563	20	–	10	.667
Purdue	7	–	9	.438	21	–	13	.618
Northwestern	6	–	10	.375	15	–	14	.517
Penn State	5	–	11	.313	13	–	14	.481
Illinois	3	–	13	.188	14	–	18	.438
No. 14 Ohio State**	1	–	1	.500	1	–	1	.500
Minnesota***	0	–	8	.000	0	–	11	.000
Michigan*	0	–	11	.000	0	–	19	.000
† 1999 Big Ten tournament winner Rankings from AP poll *Michigan: 12 games vacated due to sanctions against the program **Ohio State: 34 games including 5 NCAA Tourn. games vacated due to sanctions against the program *** Minnesota vacated 17 games including 1 NCAA Tourn. game due to sanctions against the program Disputed records: Michigan: 12–19, 5–11; Ohio State: 27–9, 12–4; Minnesota: 17–11, 8–8

1998–99 Big West men's basketball standings
	Conf.				Overall
Team	W		L	PCT	W		L	PCT
East Division
Boise State	12	–	4	.750	21	–	8	.724
New Mexico State †	12	–	4	.750	23	–	10	.697
Idaho	11	–	5	.688	16	–	11	.593
Utah State	8	–	8	.500	15	–	13	.536
Nevada	4	–	12	.250	8	–	18	.308
North Texas	4	–	12	.250	4	–	22	.154
West Division
UC Santa Barbara	12	–	4	.750	15	–	13	.536
Long Beach State	9	–	7	.563	13	–	15	.464
Pacific	9	–	7	.563	14	–	13	.519
Cal State Fullerton	7	–	9	.438	13	–	14	.481
Cal Poly	6	–	10	.375	11	–	16	.407
UC Irvine	2	–	14	.125	6	–	20	.231
† 1999 Big West tournament winner As of April 10, 1999; Rankings from AP poll

1998–99 CAA men's basketball standings
	Conf.				Overall
Team	W		L	PCT	W		L	PCT
George Mason †	13	–	3	.813	19	–	11	.633
Old Dominion	11	–	5	.688	25	–	9	.735
Richmond	10	–	6	.625	15	–	12	.556
James Madison	9	–	7	.563	16	–	11	.593
UNC Wilmington	9	–	7	.563	11	–	17	.393
VCU	8	–	8	.500	15	–	16	.484
East Carolina	7	–	9	.438	13	–	14	.481
William & Mary	3	–	13	.188	8	–	19	.296
American	2	–	14	.125	7	–	21	.250
† 1999 CAA tournament winner Rankings from AP Poll

1998–99 Conference USA men's basketball standings
	Conf.				Overall
Team	W		L	PCT	W		L	PCT
American
No. 11 Cincinnati	12	–	4	.750	27	–	6	.818
Louisville	11	–	5	.688	19	–	11	.633
No. 24 UNC Charlotte †	10	–	6	.625	23	–	11	.676
DePaul	10	–	6	.625	18	–	13	.581
Saint Louis	8	–	8	.500	15	–	16	.484
Marquette	6	–	10	.375	14	–	15	.483
National
UAB	10	–	6	.625	20	–	12	.625
South Florida	6	–	10	.375	14	–	14	.500
Southern Miss	6	–	10	.375	14	–	16	.467
Memphis	6	–	10	.375	13	–	15	.464
Tulane	6	–	10	.375	12	–	15	.444
Houston	5	–	11	.313	10	–	17	.370
† 1999 Conference USA Tournament winner Rankings from AP Poll

1998–99 Ivy League men's basketball standings
	Conf.				Overall
Team	W		L	PCT	W		L	PCT
Penn	13	–	1	.929	21	–	6	.778
Princeton	11	–	3	.786	22	–	8	.733
Dartmouth	10	–	4	.714	14	–	12	.538
Harvard	7	–	7	.500	13	–	13	.500
Cornell	6	–	8	.429	11	–	15	.423
Columbia	5	–	9	.357	10	–	16	.385
Brown	2	–	12	.143	4	–	22	.154
Yale	2	–	12	.143	4	–	22	.154
Rankings from AP Poll

1998–99 MAAC men's basketball standings
	Conf.				Overall
Team	W		L	PCT	W		L	PCT
Niagara	13	–	5	.722	17	–	12	.586
Siena †	13	–	5	.722	25	–	6	.806
Iona	12	–	6	.667	16	–	14	.533
Canisius	11	–	7	.611	15	–	12	.556
Saint Peter's	10	–	8	.556	14	–	15	.483
Marist	8	–	10	.444	16	–	12	.571
Rider	7	–	11	.389	12	–	16	.429
Fairfield	7	–	11	.389	12	–	15	.444
Loyola (MD)	6	–	12	.333	13	–	15	.464
Manhattan	3	–	15	.167	5	–	22	.185
† 1999 MAAC tournament winner Rankings from AP Poll

1998–99 Mid-American Conference men's basketball standings
	Conf.				Overall
Team	W		L	PCT	W		L	PCT
East
Miami	15	–	3	.833	24	–	8	.750
Kent State †	13	–	5	.722	23	–	7	.767
Akron	12	–	6	.667	18	–	9	.667
Ohio	12	–	6	.667	18	–	10	.643
Bowling Green	12	–	6	.667	18	–	10	.643
Marshall	11	–	7	.611	16	–	11	.593
Buffalo	1	–	17	.056	5	–	24	.172
West
Toledo	11	–	7	.611	19	–	9	.679
Ball State	10	–	8	.556	16	–	11	.593
Central Michigan	7	–	11	.389	10	–	16	.385
Western Michigan	6	–	12	.333	11	–	15	.423
Eastern Michigan	5	–	13	.278	5	–	20	.200
Northern Illinois	2	–	16	.111	6	–	20	.231
† 1999 MAC tournament winner Rankings from AP Poll

1998–99 Mid-Continent Conference men's basketball standings
	Conf.				Overall
Team	W		L	PCT	W		L	PCT
Oral Roberts	10	–	4	.714	17	–	11	.607
Valparaiso †	10	–	4	.714	23	–	9	.719
Western Illinois	9	–	5	.643	16	–	12	.571
Youngstown State	9	–	5	.643	14	–	14	.500
Southern Utah	6	–	8	.429	13	–	17	.433
IUPUI	6	–	8	.429	11	–	16	.407
Missouri–Kansas City	3	–	11	.214	8	–	22	.267
Chicago State	3	–	11	.214	3	–	24	.111
† 1999 Mid-Con Tournament winner Rankings from

1998–99 MEAC men's basketball standings
	Conf.				Overall
Team	W		L	PCT	W		L	PCT
South Carolina State	14	–	4	.778	17	–	12	.586
Coppin State	14	–	4	.778	15	–	14	.517
Morgan State	12	–	6	.667	14	–	14	.500
Norfolk State	11	–	7	.611	15	–	12	.556
Bethune–Cookman	10	–	9	.526	11	–	16	.407
North Carolina A&T	9	–	9	.500	13	–	15	.464
Hampton	8	–	10	.444	8	–	19	.296
Florida A&M †	8	–	11	.421	12	–	19	.387
Maryland Eastern Shore	7	–	11	.389	10	–	17	.370
Delaware State	5	–	13	.278	8	–	19	.296
Howard	2	–	16	.111	2	–	25	.074
† 1999 MEAC tournament winner Rankings from AP Poll

1998–99 Midwestern Collegiate Conference men's basketball standings
	Conf.				Overall
Team	W		L	PCT	W		L	PCT
Detroit †	12	–	2	.857	25	–	6	.806
Butler	11	–	3	.786	22	–	10	.688
Green Bay	9	–	5	.643	20	–	11	.645
Loyola Chicago	7	–	7	.500	9	–	18	.333
Cleveland State	6	–	8	.429	14	–	14	.500
Milwaukee	5	–	9	.357	8	–	19	.296
Wright State	4	–	10	.286	9	–	18	.333
UIC	2	–	12	.143	7	–	21	.250
† 1999 MCC tournament winner

1998–99 Missouri Valley Conference men's basketball standings
	Conf.				Overall
Team	W		L	PCT	W		L	PCT
Evansville	13	–	5	.722	23	–	10	.697
Creighton †	11	–	7	.611	22	–	9	.710
Southwest Missouri State	11	–	7	.611	22	–	11	.667
Bradley	11	–	7	.611	17	–	12	.586
Southern Illinois	10	–	8	.556	15	–	12	.556
Indiana State	10	–	8	.556	15	–	12	.556
Illinois State	7	–	11	.389	16	–	15	.516
Wichita State	6	–	12	.333	13	–	17	.433
Northern Iowa	6	–	12	.333	9	–	18	.333
Drake	5	–	13	.278	10	–	17	.370
† 1999 MVC tournament winner Rankings from AP Poll

1998–99 Northeast Conference men's basketball standings
	Conf.				Overall
Team	W		L	PCT	W		L	PCT
UMBC	17	–	3	.850	19	–	9	.679
St. Francis Brooklyn	16	–	4	.800	20	–	8	.714
Robert Morris	12	–	8	.600	15	–	12	.556
Central Connecticut	11	–	9	.550	19	–	13	.594
Long Island	10	–	10	.500	10	–	17	.370
Mount St. Mary's†	10	–	10	.500	15	–	15	.500
Fairleigh Dickinson	9	–	11	.450	12	–	16	.429
Wagner	7	–	13	.350	9	–	18	.333
Saint Francis (PA)	7	–	13	.350	9	–	17	.346
Quinnipiac	6	–	14	.300	9	–	18	.333
Monmouth	5	–	15	.250	5	–	21	.192
† 1999 NEC tournament winner

1998–99 Ohio Valley Conference men's basketball standings
	Conf.				Overall
Team	W		L	PCT	W		L	PCT
Murray State †	16	–	2	.889	27	–	6	.818
Southeast Missouri State	15	–	3	.833	20	–	9	.690
Middle Tennessee	9	–	9	.500	12	–	19	.387
Austin Peay	9	–	9	.500	11	–	16	.407
Morehead State	9	–	9	.500	13	–	15	.464
Tennessee State	9	–	9	.500	12	–	15	.444
Eastern Illinois	8	–	10	.444	13	–	16	.448
Tennessee Tech	8	–	10	.444	12	–	15	.444
UT Martin	5	–	13	.278	8	–	18	.308
Eastern Kentucky	2	–	16	.111	3	–	23	.115
† 1999 OVC tournament winner Rankings from AP Poll

1998–99 Pacific-10 Conference men's basketball standings
	Conf.				Overall
Team	W		L	PCT	W		L	PCT
No. 7 Stanford	15	–	3	.833	26	–	7	.788
No. 12 Arizona	13	–	5	.722	22	–	7	.759
No. 15 UCLA	12	–	6	.667	22	–	9	.710
Washington	10	–	8	.556	17	–	12	.586
California	8	–	10	.444	22	–	11	.667
Oregon	8	–	10	.444	19	–	13	.594
USC	7	–	11	.389	15	–	13	.536
Oregon State	7	–	11	.389	13	–	14	.481
Arizona State	6	–	12	.333	14	–	16	.467
Washington State	4	–	14	.222	10	–	19	.345
As of July 26, 2011; Rankings from AP Poll

1998–99 Patriot League men's basketball standings
	Conf.				Overall
Team	W		L	PCT	W		L	PCT
Lafayette †	10	–	2	.833	22	–	8	.733
Navy	9	–	3	.750	20	–	7	.741
Bucknell	9	–	3	.750	16	–	13	.552
Colgate	7	–	5	.583	14	–	14	.500
Army	4	–	8	.333	8	–	19	.296
Holy Cross	3	–	9	.250	7	–	20	.259
Lehigh	0	–	12	.000	6	–	22	.214
† 1999 Patriot League tournament winner

1998–99 Southeastern Conference men's basketball standings
	Conf.				Overall
Team	W		L	PCT	W		L	PCT
East
No. 20 Tennessee	12	–	4	.750	21	–	9	.700
No. 8 Kentucky †	11	–	5	.688	28	–	9	.757
No. 23 Florida	10	–	6	.625	22	–	9	.710
Georgia	6	–	10	.375	15	–	15	.500
Vanderbilt	5	–	11	.313	14	–	15	.483
South Carolina	3	–	13	.188	8	–	21	.276
West
No. 4 Auburn	14	–	2	.875	29	–	4	.879
No. 17 Arkansas	9	–	7	.563	23	–	11	.676
Ole Miss	8	–	8	.500	20	–	13	.606
Mississippi State	8	–	8	.500	20	–	13	.606
Alabama	6	–	10	.375	17	–	15	.531
LSU	4	–	12	.250	12	–	15	.444
† 1999 SEC tournament winner Rankings from AP Poll

1998–99 Southern Conference men's basketball standings
	Conf.				Overall
Team	W		L	PCT	W		L	PCT
North
Appalachian State	13	–	3	.813	21	–	8	.724
Davidson	11	–	5	.688	16	–	11	.593
East Tennessee State	9	–	7	.563	17	–	11	.607
VMI	9	–	7	.563	12	–	15	.444
UNC Greensboro	5	–	11	.313	7	–	20	.259
Western Carolina	2	–	14	.125	8	–	21	.276
South
No. 16 College of Charleston †	16	–	0	1.000	28	–	3	.903
Chattanooga	9	–	7	.563	16	–	12	.571
Wofford	8	–	8	.500	11	–	16	.407
Georgia Southern	6	–	10	.375	11	–	17	.393
Furman	5	–	11	.313	12	–	16	.429
The Citadel	3	–	13	.188	9	–	18	.333
† 1999 SoCon Tournament winner As of April 30, 1999; Rankings from AP poll

1998–99 Southland Conference men's basketball standings
	Conf.				Overall
Team	W		L	PCT	W		L	PCT
Southwest Texas State	13	–	5	.722	19	–	9	.679
UTSA †	12	–	6	.667	18	–	11	.621
Nicholls State	12	–	6	.667	14	–	15	.483
Northeast Louisiana	12	–	6	.667	13	–	14	.481
Lamar	11	–	7	.611	17	–	11	.607
McNeese State	11	–	7	.611	13	–	15	.464
Northwestern State	8	–	10	.444	11	–	15	.423
Texas–Arlington	8	–	10	.444	10	–	16	.385
Sam Houston State	7	–	11	.389	10	–	16	.385
Southeastern Louisiana	3	–	15	.167	6	–	20	.231
Stephen F. Austin	2	–	16	.111	4	–	22	.154
† 1999 Southland tournament winner

1998–99 SWAC men's basketball standings
	Conf.				Overall
Team	W		L	PCT	W		L	PCT
Alcorn State †	14	–	2	.875	23	–	7	.767
Southern	13	–	3	.813	21	–	7	.750
Jackson State	11	–	5	.688	16	–	12	.571
Mississippi Valley State	10	–	6	.625	14	–	13	.519
Alabama State	8	–	8	.500	11	–	16	.407
Texas Southern	6	–	10	.375	8	–	19	.296
Grambling State	5	–	11	.313	6	–	21	.222
Prairie View A&M	4	–	12	.250	6	–	21	.222
Arkansas–Pine Bluff	1	–	15	.063	3	–	24	.111
Alabama A&M	0	–	0	–	10	–	17	.370
† 1999 SWAC tournament winner Rankings from AP Poll

1998–99 Sun Belt Conference men's basketball standings
	Conf.				Overall
Team	W		L	PCT	W		L	PCT
Louisiana Tech	10	–	4	.714	19	–	9	.679
Arkansas State †	9	–	5	.643	18	–	12	.600
Florida International	7	–	7	.500	13	–	16	.448
SW Louisiana	7	–	7	.500	13	–	16	.448
Western Kentucky	7	–	7	.500	13	–	16	.448
South Alabama	6	–	8	.429	11	–	16	.407
New Orleans	5	–	9	.357	14	–	16	.467
Arkansas-Little Rock	5	–	9	.357	12	–	15	.444
† 1999 Sun Belt Conference tournament winner Rankings from AP Poll

1998–99 Trans America Athletic Conference men's basketball standings
	Conf.				Overall
Team	W		L	PCT	W		L	PCT
Samford †	15	–	1	.938	24	–	6	.800
Central Florida	13	–	3	.813	19	–	10	.655
Georgia State	11	–	5	.688	17	–	13	.567
Stetson	10	–	6	.625	14	–	13	.519
Centenary	9	–	7	.563	14	–	14	.500
Jacksonville	7	–	9	.438	12	–	15	.444
Campbell	6	–	10	.375	9	–	18	.333
Troy State	6	–	10	.375	9	–	18	.333
Mercer	5	–	11	.313	8	–	18	.308
Jacksonville State	3	–	13	.188	8	–	18	.308
Florida Atlantic	3	–	13	.188	6	–	20	.231
† 1999 TAAC tournament winner Rankings from AP Poll

1998–99 West Coast Conference men's basketball standings
	Conf.				Overall
Team	W		L	PCT	W		L	PCT
Gonzaga †	12	–	2	.857	28	–	7	.800
San Diego	9	–	5	.643	18	–	9	.667
Pepperdine	9	–	5	.643	19	–	13	.594
Santa Clara	8	–	6	.571	14	–	15	.483
Loyola Marymount	6	–	8	.429	11	–	16	.407
Saint Mary's	5	–	9	.357	13	–	18	.419
San Francisco	4	–	10	.286	12	–	18	.400
Portland	3	–	11	.214	9	–	18	.333
† 1999 WCC tournament winner Rankings from AP poll

1998–99 WAC men's basketball standings
	Conf.				Overall
Team	W		L	PCT	W		L	PCT
Mountain
UNLV	9	–	5	.643	16	–	13	.552
Tulsa	9	–	5	.643	23	–	10	.697
Rice	8	–	6	.571	18	–	10	.643
TCU	7	–	7	.500	21	–	11	.656
SMU	7	–	7	.500	15	–	15	.500
Colorado State	7	–	7	.500	19	–	11	.633
Wyoming	7	–	7	.500	18	–	10	.643
Air Force	2	–	12	.143	10	–	16	.385
Pacific
No. 6 Utah †	14	–	0	1.000	28	–	5	.848
No. 25 New Mexico	9	–	5	.643	25	–	9	.735
Fresno State	9	–	5	.643	21	–	12	.636
UTEP	8	–	6	.571	16	–	12	.571
BYU	6	–	8	.429	12	–	16	.429
San Jose State	5	–	9	.357	12	–	16	.429
Hawaii	3	–	11	.214	6	–	20	.231
San Diego State	2	–	12	.143	4	–	22	.154
† 1999 WAC tournament winner Rankings from AP Poll

=== Division I independents ===
Two schools played as Division I independents.

1998–99 NCAA Division I men's basketball independents standings
	Conf.				Overall
Team	W		L	PCT	W		L	PCT
Denver	-	–	-	–	10	–	17	.370
Texas–Pan American	-	–	-	–	5	–	22	.185
Rankings from AP Poll

=== Informal championships ===
Conference	Regular season winner	Most Valuable Player
Philadelphia Big 5	Villanova	Pepe Sánchez, Temple

For the eighth consecutive season, the Philadelphia Big 5 did not play a full round-robin schedule in which each team met each other team once, a format it had used from its first season of competition in 1955–56 through the 1990–91 season. Instead, each team played only two games against other Big 5 members, and Villanova finished with a 2–0 record in head-to-head competition among the Big 5. The Big 5 did not revive its full round-robin schedule until the 1999–2000 season.

=== Statistical leaders ===
Source for additional stats categories

Points per game			Rebounds per game			Assists per game			Steals per game		
Player	School	PPG	Player	School	RPG	Player	School	APG	Player	School	SPG
Alvin Young	Niagara	25.1	Ian McGinnis	Dartmouth	12.2	Doug Gottlieb	Oklahoma State	8.8	Shawnta Rogers	George Washington	3.6
Ray Minlend	San Francisco	24.3	Todd MacCulloch	Washington	11.9	Chico Fletcher	Arkansas State	8.3	Tim Winn	St. Bonaventure	3.5
Wally Szczerbiak	Miami (OH)	24.2	Jeff Foster	SW Texas State	11.3	Ali Ton	Davidson	7.6	Jason Rowe	Loyola (MD)	3.4
Brian Merriweather	Texas–Pan American	23.7	Chris Mihm	Texas	11.0	Ed Cota	North Carolina	7.4	John Linehan	Providence	3.3
Damian Woolfolk	Norfolk State	23.5	K'zell Wesson	La Salle	10.8	Chris Herren	Fresno State	7.2	Cookie Belcher	Nebraska	3.2

Blocked shots per game			Field-goal percentage			Three-Point FG percentage			Free-throw percentage		
Player	School	BPG	Player	School	FG%	Player	School	3FG%	Player	School	FT%
Tarvis Williams	Hampton	5.0	Delawn Grandison	Liberty	67.4	Rodney Thomas	IUPUI	52.2	Lonnie Cooper	Louisiana Tech	92.1
Henry Jordan	Miss. Valley St.	4.0	Todd MacCulloch	Washington	66.2	Ross Land	N. Arizona	50.9	Haywood Eaddy	Loyola Marymount	89.8
Etan Thomas	Syracuse	4.0	Quincy Gause	Georgia State	65.2	Brian Grawer	Missouri	49.6	Marcus Wilson	Evansville	89.7
Wojciech Myrda	Northeast Louisiana	3.6	Ryan Moss	Arkansas–Little Rock	64.3	Ryan Borowicz	Wisconsin–Green Bay	44.4	Jermel President	College of Charleston	89.5
Calvin Booth	Penn State	3.5	Elton Brand	Duke	62.0	Alan Puckett	The Citadel	44.4	Arthur Lee	Stanford	88.6

== Postseason tournaments ==
=== NCAA tournament ===
==== Final Four – Tropicana Field, St. Petersburg, Florida ====
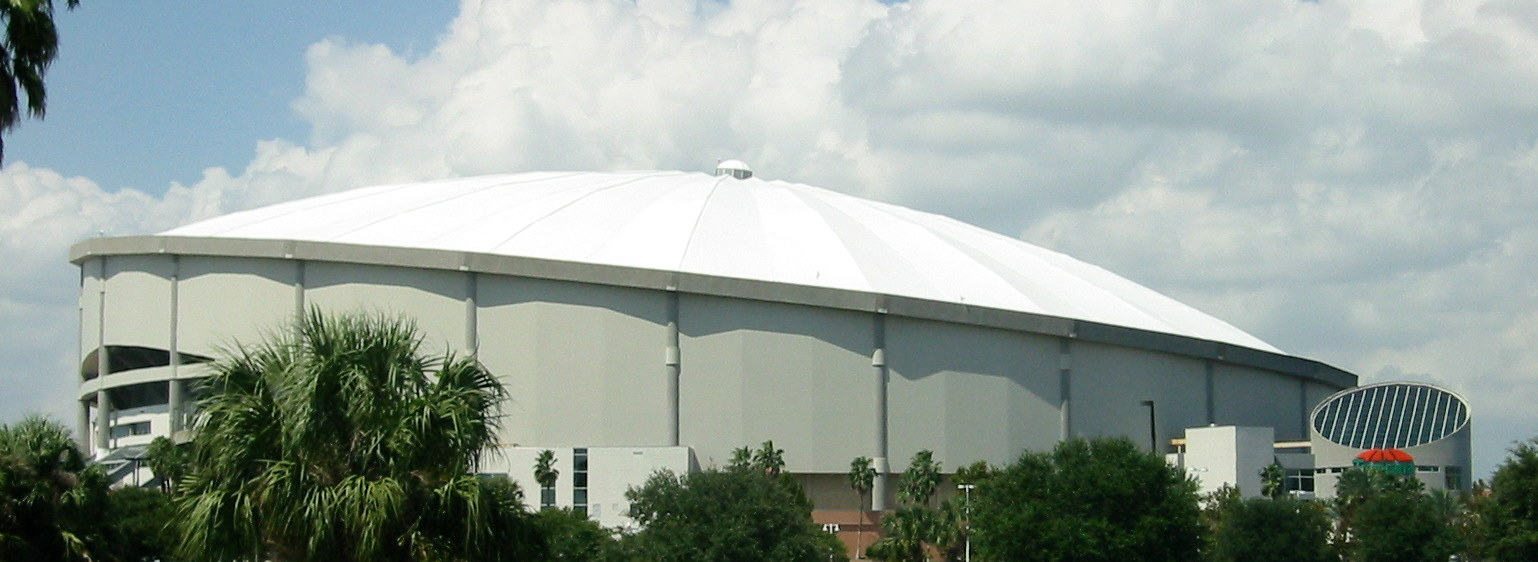
Tropicana Field in St. Petersburg, Florida, hosted the Final Four.

National semifinals
E1	Duke	68
MW1	Michigan State	62
S4	Ohio State#	58
W1	Connecticut	64

National Championship Game
E1	Duke	74
W1	Connecticut	77

# - Ohio State vacated 34 games, including all NCAA Tournament wins from the 1998–99 season due to the Jim O’Brien scandal. Unlike forfeiture, a vacated game does not result in the other school being credited with a win, only with Ohio State removing the wins from its own record.

=== National Invitation tournament ===
==== Semifinals & finals ====
Semifinals
California	85
Oregon	69
Clemson	79
Xavier	76

Finals
California	61
Clemson	60
Third place
Oregon	75
Xavier	106

== Award winners ==
=== Consensus All-American teams ===
Consensus First Team
Player	Position	Class	Team
Elton Brand	C	Sophomore	Duke
Mateen Cleaves	G	Junior	Michigan State
Richard Hamilton	F-G	Junior	Connecticut
Andre Miller	G	Senior	Utah
Jason Terry	G	Senior	Arizona

Consensus Second Team
Player	Position	Class	Team
Evan Eschmeyer	C	Senior	Northwestern
Steve Francis	G	Junior	Maryland
Trajan Langdon	G	Senior	Duke
Chris Porter	F	Junior	Auburn
Wally Szczerbiak	F	Senior	Miami (OH)

=== Major player of the year awards ===
- Wooden Award: Elton Brand, Duke
- Naismith Award: Elton Brand, Duke
- Associated Press Player of the Year: Elton Brand, Duke
- NABC Player of the Year: Elton Brand, Duke
- Oscar Robertson Trophy (USBWA): Elton Brand, Duke
- Adolph Rupp Trophy: Elton Brand, Duke
- Sporting News Player of the Year: Elton Brand, Duke

=== Major freshman of the year awards ===
- USBWA Freshman of the Year: Quentin Richardson, DePaul
- Sporting News Freshman of the Year: Quentin Richardson, DePaul

=== Major coach of the year awards ===
- Associated Press Coach of the Year: Cliff Ellis, Auburn
- Henry Iba Award (USBWA): Cliff Ellis, Auburn
- NABC Coach of the Year: Mike Krzyzewski, Duke & Jim O'Brien, Ohio State
- Naismith College Coach of the Year: Mike Krzyzewski, Duke
- CBS/Chevrolet Coach of the Year: Cliff Ellis, Auburn
- Sporting News Coach of the Year: Cliff Ellis, Auburn

=== Other major awards ===
- NABC Defensive Player of the Year: Shane Battier, Duke
- Frances Pomeroy Naismith Award (Best player under 6'0): Shawnta Rogers, George Washington
- Robert V. Geasey Trophy (Top player in Philadelphia Big 5): Pepe Sánchez, Temple
- NIT/Haggerty Award (Top player in New York City metro area): Ron Artest, St. John's
- Chip Hilton Player of the Year Award (Strong personal character): Tim Hill, Harvard

== Coaching changes ==
A number of teams changed coaches during the season and after it ended.

Team	Former Coach	Interim Coach	New Coach	Reason
Arkansas–Little Rock	Wimp Sanderson		Sidney Moncrief	
Baylor	Harry Miller		Dave Bliss	
Brown	Frank Dobbs		Glen Miller	Miller was hired from Division III Connecticut College.
Delaware State	Jimmy DuBose		Tony Sheals	
Drexel	Bill Herrion		Steve Seymour	Herrion left to coach East Carolina. Seymour was promoted from assistant.
East Carolina	Joe Dooley		Bill Herrion	Dooley was fired after the season, he went 57–52. Dooley joined the New Mexico coaching staff.
Florida Atlantic	Kevin Billerman		Sidney Green	Green was hired from Division II North Florida.
Fordham	Nick Macarchuk		Bob Hill	Macarchuk left to coach Stony Brook.
Georgetown	John Thompson Jr.		Craig Esherick	Thompson resigned in mid-season on January 8, 1999, after 26 1/2 seasons as head coach. Assistant coach Esherick immediately succeeded him as head coach.
Georgia	Ron Jirsa		Jim Harrick	Jirsa left to join the Dayton coaching staff.
Georgia Southern	Gregg Polinsky		Jeff Price	
Gonzaga	Dan Monson		Mark Few	Monson left to coach Minnesota. Few was promoted from assistant.
Grambling State	Lacey Reynolds		Larry Wright	
Holy Cross	Bill Raynor		Ralph Willard	
Illinois State	Kevin Stallings		Tom Richardson	Stallings left to coach Vanderbilt. Richardson was promoted from assistant.
Iowa	Tom Davis		Steve Alford	Davis' contact was not renewed.
Lamar	Grey Giovanine		Mike Deane	
Manhattan	John Leonard		Bobby Gonzalez	Gonzalez was hired from the Virginia coaching staff.
Marquette	Mike Deane		Tom Crean	Deane left to coach Lamar. Crean was hired from the Michigan State coaching staff.
Milwaukee	Ric Cobb		Bo Ryan	Ryan was hired from Division III Wisconsin–Platteville after winning back to back Division III national championships.
Minnesota	Clem Haskins		Dan Monson	Haskins was forced to resign due to cheating scandal.
Missouri	Norm Stewart		Quin Snyder	Long time coach Norm Stewart retired due to health reasons. Snyder was hired from the Duke coaching staff.
Nevada	Pat Foster		Trent Johnson	Foster retired. Johnson was hired from the Stanford coaching staff.
New Hampshire	Jeff Jackson		Phil Rowe	Jackson resigned after three seasons with New Hampshire going 21–60. Jackson joined the Vanderbilt coaching staff. Rowe was hired from Division III Keene State
New Mexico	Dave Bliss		Fran Fraschilla	Bliss left to coach Baylor.
Norfolk State	Mel Coleman		Wil Jones	Jones ware hired from Division II University of the District of Columbia.
North Carolina A&T	Roy Thomas		Curtis Hunter	
Northern Arizona	Ben Howland		Mike Adras	Howland left to coach Pittsburgh. Adras was an assistant under Howland.
Northwestern State	J. D. Barnett		Mike McConathy	McConathy was hired from Bossier Parish Community College.
Notre Dame	John MacLeod		Matt Doherty	MacLeod resigned and joined the Phoenix Suns coaching staff. Doherty was hired from the Kansas coaching staff.
Oral Roberts	Barry Hinson		Scott Sutton	Hinson left to coach Southwest Missouri State. Sutton was an assistant under Hinson.
Pepperdine	Lorenzo Romar		Jan van Breda Kolff	Romar left to coach Saint Louis.
Pittburgh	Ralph Willard		Ben Howland	Willard left to coach his alma mater, Holy Cross.
Rhode Island	Jim Harrick		Jerry DeGregorio	Harrick left to coach Georgia. DeGregorio was an assistant under Harrick.
Saint Francis	Tom McConnell		Bobby Jones	Jones was hired from the Minnesota coaching staff.
Saint Louis	Charlie Spoonhour		Lorenzo Romar	
San Diego State	Fred Trenkle		Steve Fisher	
San Jose State	Phil Johnson		Steve Barnes	Johnson left to join the Chicago Bulls coaching staff. Barnes was hired from the Iowa State coaching staff.
Southwest Missouri State	Steve Alford		Barry Hinson	Alford left to coach Iowa.
UNC Greensboro	Randy Peele		Fran McCaffery	McCaffery was hired from the Notre Dame coaching Staff.
UT Martin	Cal Luther		Bret Campbell	Campbell was hired from the Austin Peay coaching staff.
UT Rio Grande Valley	Delray Brooks		Bob Hoffman	Hoffman was hired from Division II Oklahoma Baptist.
UTEP	Don Haskins		Jason Rabedeaux	
Vanderbilt	Jan van Breda Kolff		Kevin Stallings	van Breda Kolff left to coach Pepperdine.
Virginia Tech	Bobby Hussey		Ricky Stokes	Hussey was fired and joined the Clemson coaching staff. Stokes was hired from the Texas coaching staff.
Wagner	Tim Capstraw		Dereck Whittenburg	Whittenburg was hired from the Georgia Tech coaching staff.
Washington State	Kevin Eastman		Paul Graham	Graham was hired from the Oaklahoma State coaching staff.
Weber State	Rob Abegglen		Joe Cravens	Abegglen was fired after a successful season going 25–8 and upsetting #3 seed North Carolina, but at the end of the season he was charged with domestic violence in an argument with his wife that resulted in him breaking her wrist. Cravens was an assistant under Abegglan and was promoted to head coach.
Yale	Dick Kuchen		James Jones	
Youngstown State	Dan Peters		John Robic	Peters left to join the Cincinnati coaching staff. Robic was hired from the UMass coaching staff.
