= 1998–99 George Washington Colonials men's basketball team =

American college basketball season

1998–99 George Washington Colonials men's basketball

Atlantic 10 Regular season co-champions

NCAA tournament, First Round
- Conference: Atlantic 10 Conference
- Record: 20–9 (13–3 A-10)
- Head coach: Tom Penders (1st season)
- Home arena: Charles E. Smith Athletic Center

1998–99 Atlantic 10 men's basketball standings
	Conf.				Overall
Team	W		L	PCT	W		L	PCT
East
Temple	13	–	3	.813	24	–	11	.686
Rhode Island †	10	–	6	.625	20	–	13	.606
UMass	9	–	7	.563	14	–	16	.467
St. Bonaventure	8	–	8	.500	14	–	15	.483
Fordham	5	–	11	.313	12	–	15	.444
Saint Joseph's	5	–	11	.313	12	–	18	.400
West
George Washington	13	–	3	.813	20	–	9	.690
Xavier	12	–	4	.750	25	–	11	.694
La Salle	8	–	8	.500	13	–	15	.464
Virginia Tech	7	–	9	.438	13	–	15	.464
Dayton	5	–	11	.313	11	–	17	.393
Duquesne	1	–	15	.063	5	–	23	.179
† 1999 Atlantic 10 Tournament winner Rankings from AP poll

The 1998–99 George Washington Colonials men's basketball team represent George Washington University as a member of the Atlantic 10 Conference during the 1998–99 NCAA Division I men's basketball season. The team was coached by Tom Penders and played their home games at the Charles E. Smith Athletic Center. The Colonials finished atop the regular season conference standings. After being knocked out in the semifinal round of the A-10 tournament, GW received an at-large bid to the 1998 NCAA tournament as No. 11 seed in the South region. The Colonials were defeated by No. 6 seed Indiana, 108–88, to finish with a record of 20–9 (13–3 A-10).

== Roster ==
1998–99 George Washington Colonials men's basketball team
Players	Coaches
Pos. / # / Name / Height / Weight / Year / Hometown; G / 54 / Shawnta Rogers / 5 ft 4 in (1.63 m) / 155 lb (70 kg) / Sr / Baltimore, Maryland	Head coach: Tom Penders (Connecticut); Assistant coach(es) Legend: (C) Team captain; (S) Suspended; (I) Ineligible; (W) Walk-on; Injured; Current redshirt; Roster

== Schedule and results ==
Date time, TV	Rank^{#}	Opponent^{#}	Result	Record	Site city, state
Regular season
Nov 13, 1998*		George Mason	W 71–59	1–0	Charles E. Smith Center; Washington, D.C.
Nov 17, 1998*		at Illinois	W 64–58	2–0	Assembly Hall; Champaign, Illinois
Nov 29, 1998*		at Charlotte	L 68–76	2–1	Dale F. Halton Arena; Charlotte, North Carolina
Dec 2, 1998*		at American	W 97–76	3–1	Bender Arena; Washington, D.C.
Dec 6, 1998*		DePaul; BB&T Classic	L 79–87	3–2	MCI Center; Washington, D.C.
Dec 7, 1998*		No. 6 Stanford; BB&T Classic	L 56–70	3–3	MCI Center; Washington, D.C.
Dec 12, 1998*		Old Dominion	W 92–89	4–3	Charles E. Smith Center; Washington, D.C.
Dec 23, 1998*		at Siena	L 99–106	4–4	Pepsi Arena; Loudonville, New York
Dec 26, 1998*		Bradley	W 91–71	5–4	Charles E. Smith Center; Washington, D.C.
Dec 30, 1998*		Ohio	W 76–65	6–4	Charles E. Smith Center; Washington, D.C.
Jan 2, 1999		at Duquesne	W 80–54	7–4 (1–0)	A.J. Palumbo Center; Pittsburgh, Pennsylvania
Jan 9, 1999		La Salle	W 93–75	8–4 (2–0)	Charles E. Smith Center; Washington, D.C.
Jan 14, 1999		Dayton	W 81–69	9–4 (3–0)	Charles E. Smith Center; Washington, D.C.
Jan 17, 1999		at Xavier	L 61–81	9–5 (3–1)	Cincinnati Gardens; Cincinnati, Ohio
Jan 21, 1999		at St. Bonaventure	W 67–56	10–5 (4–1)	Reilly Center; St. Bonaventure, New York
Jan 23, 1999		at Rhode Island	W 81–74	11–5 (5–1)	Keaney Gymnasium; Kingston, Rhode Island
Jan 28, 1999		Duquesne	W 109–57	12–5 (6–1)	Charles E. Smith Center; Washington, D.C.
Jan 31, 1999		Fordham	W 76–63	13–5 (7–1)	Charles E. Smith Center; Washington, D.C.
Feb 3, 1999		at La Salle	W 72–70	14–5 (8–1)	Tom Gola Arena; Philadelphia, Pennsylvania
Feb 6, 1999		at Virginia Tech	L 75–77	14–6 (8–2)	Cassell Coliseum; Blacksburg, Virginia
Feb 12, 1999		Saint Joseph's	W 94–70	15–6 (9–2)	Charles E. Smith Center; Washington, D.C.
Feb 14, 1999		at Dayton	W 69–65	16–6 (10–2)	University of Dayton Arena; Dayton, Ohio
Feb 17, 1999		UMass	W 78–72	17–6 (11–2)	Charles E. Smith Center; Washington, D.C.
Feb 20, 1999		at Temple	L 56–72	17–7 (11–3)	The Apollo of Temple; Philadelphia, Pennsylvania
Feb 24, 1999		Virginia Tech	W 77–67	18–7 (12–3)	Charles E. Smith Center; Washington, D.C.
Feb 27, 1999		Xavier	W 77–74	19–7 (13–3)	Charles E. Smith Center; Washington, D.C.
Atlantic 10 Tournament
Mar 4, 1999*		vs. Dayton; Quarterfinals	W 100–90	20–7	The Spectrum; Philadelphia, Pennsylvania
Mar 5, 1999*		vs. Rhode Island; Semifinals	L 78–94	20–8	The Spectrum; Philadelphia, Pennsylvania
NCAA Tournament
Mar 11, 1999*	(11 S)	vs. (6 S) No. 19 Indiana; First round	L 88–108	20–9	Orlando Arena; Orlando, Florida
*Non-conference game. ^{#}Rankings from AP poll. (#) Tournament seedings in parentheses. S=South.
