= 1999 Atlantic 10 men's basketball tournament =

- Classification: Division I
- Season: 1998–99
- Teams: 12
- Site: First Union Spectrum; Philadelphia
- Champions: Rhode Island (1st title)
- Winning coach: Jim Harrick (1st title)
- MVP: Lamar Odom (Rhode Island)

1998–99 Atlantic 10 men's basketball standings
	Conf.				Overall
Team	W		L	PCT	W		L	PCT
East
Temple	13	–	3	.813	24	–	11	.686
Rhode Island †	10	–	6	.625	20	–	13	.606
UMass	9	–	7	.563	14	–	16	.467
St. Bonaventure	8	–	8	.500	14	–	15	.483
Fordham	5	–	11	.313	12	–	15	.444
Saint Joseph's	5	–	11	.313	12	–	18	.400
West
George Washington	13	–	3	.813	20	–	9	.690
Xavier	12	–	4	.750	25	–	11	.694
La Salle	8	–	8	.500	13	–	15	.464
Virginia Tech	7	–	9	.438	13	–	15	.464
Dayton	5	–	11	.313	11	–	17	.393
Duquesne	1	–	15	.063	5	–	23	.179
† 1999 Atlantic 10 Tournament winner Rankings from AP poll

The 1999 Atlantic 10 men's basketball tournament was played from March 3 to March 6, 1999, at the First Union Spectrum in Philadelphia, Pennsylvania, United States. The winner was named champion of the Atlantic 10 Conference and received an automatic bid to the 1999 NCAA Men's Division I Basketball Tournament.

== Background ==
The top two teams in each division received a first-round bye in the conference tournament. The University of Rhode Island won its first conference tournament after Lamar Odom of Rhode Island made a 3-point 'buzzer beater' to beat Temple. Eggy then tackled Odom along with hundreds of other UMass fans left over in the stands.

Temple and George Washington also received bids to the NCAA Tournament. Lamar Odom was named the tournament's Most Outstanding Player.

Future NBA player Mark Karcher of Temple was among those also named to the All-Championship Team.

== Bracket ==
First round Wednesday, March 3
W4	Virginia Tech	74
E5	Fordham	63
E3	UMass	80
W6	Duquesne	70
E4	St. Bonaventure	69
W5	Dayton	70*
W3	La Salle	81
E6	Saint Joseph's	54

Quarterfinals; Thursday, March 4
E1	Temple	64
W4	Virginia Tech	51
W2	Xavier	72
E3	Massachusetts	68
W1	George Washington	100
W5	Dayton	90
E2	Rhode Island	83
W3	La Salle	58

Semifinals; Friday, March 5
E1	Temple	76
W2	Xavier	64
W1	George Washington	78
E2	Rhode Island	94

Final; Saturday, March 6
E1	Temple	59
E2	Rhode Island	62

All games played at The Spectrum, Philadelphia, Pennsylvania
* - Overtime
