= 1998–99 Rhode Island Rams men's basketball team =

American college basketball season

1998–99 Rhode Island Rams men's basketball

A-10 tournament champions

NCAA tournament, First Round
- Conference: Atlantic 10 Conference
- Record: 20–13 (10–6 A-10)
- Head coach: Jim Harrick (2nd season)
- Assistant coach: Jerry DeGregorio (2nd season)
- Home arena: Keaney Gymnasium

1998–99 Atlantic 10 men's basketball standings
	Conf.				Overall
Team	W		L	PCT	W		L	PCT
East
Temple	13	–	3	.813	24	–	11	.686
Rhode Island †	10	–	6	.625	20	–	13	.606
UMass	9	–	7	.563	14	–	16	.467
St. Bonaventure	8	–	8	.500	14	–	15	.483
Fordham	5	–	11	.313	12	–	15	.444
Saint Joseph's	5	–	11	.313	12	–	18	.400
West
George Washington	13	–	3	.813	20	–	9	.690
Xavier	12	–	4	.750	25	–	11	.694
La Salle	8	–	8	.500	13	–	15	.464
Virginia Tech	7	–	9	.438	13	–	15	.464
Dayton	5	–	11	.313	11	–	17	.393
Duquesne	1	–	15	.063	5	–	23	.179
† 1999 Atlantic 10 Tournament winner Rankings from AP poll

The 1998–99 Rhode Island Rams men's basketball team represented the University of Rhode Island in the 1997–98 college basketball season. This was head coach Jim Harrick's second of two seasons at Rhode Island. The Rams competed in the Atlantic 10 Conference and played their home games at Keaney Gymnasium. They finished the season 20–13, 10–6 in A-10 play and won the 1999 Atlantic 10 men's basketball tournament. They received an automatic bid to the 1999 NCAA tournament where they were beaten by No. 5 seed UNC Charlotte in the opening round.

== Roster ==
1998–99 Rhode Island Rams men's basketball team
Players
Coaches

Pos.	#	Name	Height	Weight	Year	Hometown
F	5	Lamar Odom	6 ft 10 in (2.08 m)	220 lb (100 kg)	So	Queens, New York
F/C	34	Antonio Reynolds-Dean	6 ft 7 in (2.01 m)	210 lb (95 kg)	Sr	Marietta, Georgia

Head coach

- Jim Harrick

Assistant coach(es)

Legend

- (C) Team captain
- (S) Suspended
- (I) Ineligible
- (W) Walk-on
- Injured
- Current redshirt

Roster

== Schedule and results ==
Date time, TV	Rank^{#}	Opponent^{#}	Result	Record	Site (attendance) city, state
Regular season
Nov 9, 1998*	No. 23	No. 25 TCU	W 87–85	1–0	Keaney Gymnasium; Kingston, Rhode Island
Nov 10, 1998*	No. 23	Vanderbilt	W 82–69	2–0	Keaney Gymnasium; Kingston, Rhode Island
Nov 14, 1998*	No. 23	at Providence	L 63–87	2–1	Providence Civic Center; Providence, Rhode Island
Nov 19, 1998*	No. 25	No. 17 Cincinnati	L 53–70	2–2	Keaney Gymnasium; Kingston, Rhode Island
Nov 24, 1998*		Brown	W 67–49	3–2	Keaney Gymnasium; Kingston, Rhode Island
Nov 28, 1998*		Wisconsin	L 59–65	3–3	Keaney Gymnasium; Kingston, Rhode Island
Dec 2, 1998*		at Utah	W 70–63	4–3	Jon M. Huntsman Center; Salt Lake City, Utah
Dec 5, 1998*		at California	L 64–71	4–4	The Arena in Oakland; Oakland, California
Atlantic 10 tournament
Mar 4, 1999*		at La Salle; Quarterfinals	W 83–58	18–12	The Spectrum; Philadelphia, Pennsylvania
Mar 5, 1999*		vs. George Washington; Semifinals	W 94–78	19–12	The Spectrum; Philadelphia, Pennsylvania
Mar 6, 1999*		vs. Temple; Championship game	W 62–59	20–12	The Spectrum; Philadelphia, Pennsylvania
NCAA tournament
Mar 12, 1999*	(12 MW)	vs. (5 MW) No. 24 UNC Charlotte; First round	L 70–81 ^{OT}	20–13	Bradley Center; Milwaukee, Wisconsin
*Non-conference game. ^{#}Rankings from AP poll. (#) Tournament seedings in parentheses. MW=Midwest. All times are in EST.

== Awards and honors ==
- Lamar Odom – AP Honorable Mention All-American

== 1999 NBA draft ==
Round	Pick	Player	NBA Team
1	4	Lamar Odom	Los Angeles Clippers
