= 1998–99 Alabama Crimson Tide men's basketball team =

American college basketball season

1998–99 Alabama Crimson Tide men's basketball

NIT, First Round
- Conference: Southeastern Conference
- Western Division
- Record: 17–15 (6–10 SEC)
- Head coach: Mark Gottfried (1st season)
- Assistant coaches: Philip Pearson; Tom Kelsey; Robert Scott
- Home arena: Coleman Coliseum

1998–99 Southeastern Conference men's basketball standings
	Conf.				Overall
Team	W		L	PCT	W		L	PCT
East
No. 20 Tennessee	12	–	4	.750	21	–	9	.700
No. 8 Kentucky †	11	–	5	.688	28	–	9	.757
No. 23 Florida	10	–	6	.625	22	–	9	.710
Georgia	6	–	10	.375	15	–	15	.500
Vanderbilt	5	–	11	.313	14	–	15	.483
South Carolina	3	–	13	.188	8	–	21	.276
West
No. 4 Auburn	14	–	2	.875	29	–	4	.879
No. 17 Arkansas	9	–	7	.563	23	–	11	.676
Ole Miss	8	–	8	.500	20	–	13	.606
Mississippi State	8	–	8	.500	20	–	13	.606
Alabama	6	–	10	.375	17	–	15	.531
LSU	4	–	12	.250	12	–	15	.444
† 1999 SEC tournament winner Rankings from AP Poll

The 1998–1999 Alabama Crimson Tide men's basketball team (variously "Alabama", "UA", "Bama" or "The Tide") represented the University of Alabama in the 1998–99 college basketball season. The head coach was Mark Gottfried, who was in his first season at Alabama. The team played its home games at Coleman Coliseum in Tuscaloosa, Alabama and was a member of the Southeastern Conference. This was the 87th season of basketball in the school's history. The Crimson Tide finished the season 17–15, 6–10 in SEC play, they lost in the second round of the 1999 SEC men's basketball tournament. They were invited to the 1999 National Invitation Tournament and lost in the first round.

== Schedule and results ==
Date time, TV	Rank^{#}	Opponent^{#}	Result	Record	Site (attendance) city, state
Exhibition
November 5, 1998*		Marathon Oil	W 92–82		Coleman Coliseum; Tuscaloosa, AL
November 10, 1998*		Worldwide Basketball	W 88–75		Coleman Coliseum; Tuscaloosa, AL
Non-conference regular season
November 15, 1998*		at Ohio State	L 70–78	0–1	Value City Arena; Columbus, OH
November 19, 1998*		Tennessee Tech	W 79–53	1–1	Coleman Coliseum; Tuscaloosa, AL
November 22, 1998*		Boston University	W 75–52	2–1	Coleman Coliseum; Tuscaloosa, AL
November 25, 1998*		McNeese State	W 71–60	3–1	Coleman Coliseum; Tuscaloosa, AL
November 28, 1998*		Jacksonville State	W 87–44	4–1	Coleman Coliseum; Tuscaloosa, AL
December 1, 1998*		at Texas A&M	L 58–65	4–2	Reed Arena; College Station, TX
December 5, 1998*		at Tulane	W 53–52	5–2	Devlin Fieldhouse; New Orleans, LA
December 8, 1998*		Alabama State	W 69–48	6–2	Coleman Coliseum; Tuscaloosa, AL
December 12, 1998*		vs. South Alabama; Arby's Holiday Hardwood Classic	W 59–45	7–2	BJCC Coliseum; Birmingham, AL
December 17, 1998*		Louisiana–Monroe	W 84–67	8–2	Coleman Coliseum; Tuscaloosa, AL
December 21, 1998*		vs. Weber State; Pearl Harbor Classic	W 84–80 ^{OT}	9–2	George Q. Cannon Activities Center; Laie, HI
December 22, 1998*		vs. Oregon State; Pearl Harbor Classic semifinals	W 59–49	10–2	George Q. Cannon Activities Center; Laie, HI
December 23, 1998*		vs. No. 15 Michigan State; Pearl Harbor Classic championship	L 58–75	10–3	George Q. Cannon Activities Center; Laie, HI
SEC regular season
January 2, 1999		Georgia	L 58–59	10–4 (0–1)	Coleman Coliseum; Tuscaloosa, AL
January 6, 1999		at Ole Miss	L 60–78	10–5 (0–2)	Tad Smith Coliseum; Oxford, MS
January 9, 1999		Mississippi State	L 50–55	10–6 (0–3)	Coleman Coliseum; Tuscaloosa, AL
January 13, 1999		at LSU	L 70–71	10–7 (0–4)	Pete Maravich Assembly Center; Baton Rouge, LA
January 16, 1999		South Carolina	W 78–70	11–7 (1–4)	Coleman Coliseum; Tuscaloosa, AL
January 20, 1999		at No. 22 Arkansas	W 67–60	12–7 (2–4)	Bud Walton Arena; Fayetteville, Arkansas
January 23, 1999		No. 6 Auburn; Iron Bowl of basketball	L 58–73	12–8 (2–5)	Coleman Coliseum; Tuscaloosa, AL
January 27, 1999		at No. 25 Florida	L 68–72	12–9 (2–6)	O'Connell Center; Gainesville, FL
January 30, 1999		at Tennessee	L 64–100	12–10 (2–7)	Thompson–Boling Arena; Knoxville, TN
February 3, 1999		at Mississippi State	L 50–79	12–11 (2–8)	Humphrey Coliseum; Starkville, MS
February 6, 1999		No. 5 Kentucky	W 62–58	13–11 (3–8)	Coleman Coliseum; Tuscaloosa, AL
February 10, 1999		LSU	W 72–71 ^{3OT}	14–11 (4–8)	Coleman Coliseum; Tuscaloosa, AL
February 13, 1999		at No. 3 Auburn; Iron Bowl of Basketball	L 61–102	14–12 (4–9)	Beard-Eaves-Memorial Coliseum; Auburn, AL
February 21, 1999		at Vanderbilt	L 75–81 ^{OT}	14–13 (4–10)	Memorial Gymnasium; Nashville, TN
February 24, 1999		Ole Miss	W 78–74	15–13 (5–10)	Coleman Coliseum; Tuscaloosa, AL
February 27, 1999		Arkansas	W 84–79	16–13 (6–10)	Coleman Coliseum; Tuscaloosa, AL
SEC tournament
March 4, 1999	(W5)	vs. (E4) Georgia; First Round	W 65–58	17–13	Georgia Dome; Atlanta, GA
March 5, 1999	(W5)	vs. (W1) No. 4 Auburn; Second Round	L 61–93	17–14	Georgia Dome; Atlanta, GA
National Invitation tournament
March 10, 1999*		at Wake Forest; First round	L 57–73	17–15	LJVM Coliseum; Winston-Salem, NC
*Non-conference game. ^{#}Rankings from AP Poll. (#) Tournament seedings in parentheses. All times are in Central Time.

== See also ==
- 1998–99 NCAA Division I men's basketball season
- 1998–99 NCAA Division I men's basketball rankings
- 1999 National Invitation Tournament
