= Greg Stolt =

American basketball player (born 1976)

Personal information
- Born: November 30, 1976 (age 49) Huntsville, Alabama
- Listed height: 6 ft 8 in (2.03 m)
- Listed weight: 225 lb (102 kg)
- Position: Power forward

Greg Stolt was a basketball player who most recently played for Cholet in France - Betclic Elite. He played college basketball for Billy Donovan's Florida Gators men's basketball team and has been honored as an SEC Basketball Legend. He was also associate vice president for the NBA's basketball operations in China.
