= 1998–99 Ole Miss Rebels men's basketball team =

American college basketball season

1998–99 Ole Miss Rebels men's basketball

NCAA tournament, second round
- Conference: Southeastern Conference
- Record: 20–13 (8–8 SEC)
- Head coach: Rod Barnes (1st season)
- Assistant coaches: Marc Dukes (1st season); Eric Bozeman (1st season); Wayne Brent (1st season)
- Home arena: Tad Smith Coliseum

1998–99 Southeastern Conference men's basketball standings
	Conf.				Overall
Team	W		L	PCT	W		L	PCT
East
No. 20 Tennessee	12	–	4	.750	21	–	9	.700
No. 8 Kentucky †	11	–	5	.688	28	–	9	.757
No. 23 Florida	10	–	6	.625	22	–	9	.710
Georgia	6	–	10	.375	15	–	15	.500
Vanderbilt	5	–	11	.313	14	–	15	.483
South Carolina	3	–	13	.188	8	–	21	.276
West
No. 4 Auburn	14	–	2	.875	29	–	4	.879
No. 17 Arkansas	9	–	7	.563	23	–	11	.676
Ole Miss	8	–	8	.500	20	–	13	.606
Mississippi State	8	–	8	.500	20	–	13	.606
Alabama	6	–	10	.375	17	–	15	.531
LSU	4	–	12	.250	12	–	15	.444
† 1999 SEC tournament winner Rankings from AP Poll

The 1998–99 Ole Miss Rebels men's basketball team represented the University of Mississippi in the 1998–99 NCAA Division I men's basketball season. The Rebels were led by first-year head coach, Rod Barnes. The Rebels played their home games at Tad Smith Coliseum in Oxford, Mississippi as members of the Southeastern Conference. This season marked the fourth NCAA Tournament appearance in school history.

== Schedule and results ==
Date time, TV	Rank^{#}	Opponent^{#}	Result	Record	Site city, state
Non-conference regular season
November 13, 1998*		Alabama State	W 87–45	1–0	Tad Smith Coliseum; Oxford, MS
November 16, 1998*		Belmont	W 91–42	2–0	Tad Smith Coliseum; Oxford, MS
November 18, 1998*		at No. 7 Temple	L 52–68	2–1	The Apollo of Temple; Philadelphia, PA
November 23, 1998*		Alabama A&M	W 89–45	3–1	Tad Smith Coliseum; Oxford, MS
November 28, 1998*		Austin Peay	W 105–62	4–1	Tad Smith Coliseum; Oxford, MS
December 2, 1998*		Louisiana–Monroe	W 95–62	5–1	Tad Smith Coliseum; Oxford, MS
December 5, 1998*		Louisville	W 88–69	6–1	Tad Smith Coliseum; Oxford, MS
December 7, 1998*		West Alabama	W 101–68	7–1	Tad Smith Coliseum; Oxford, MS
December 12, 1998*		at Memphis	L 72–78 ^{OT}	7–2	Pyramid Arena; Memphis, TN
December 21, 1998*		vs. Saint Joseph's	W 66–61	8–2	Eugene Guerra Sports Complex; San Juan, Puerto Rico
December 22, 1998*		vs. No. 23 Oklahoma	W 75–72	9–2	Caguas Municipal Complex; Caguas, Puerto Rico
December 23, 1998*		vs. Ohio State	L 62–67	9–3	Eugene Guerra Sports Complex; San Juan, Puerto Rico
December 29, 1998*		Prairie View A&M	W 111–50	10–3	Tad Smith Coliseum; Oxford, MS
SEC regular season
January 2, 1999		at Vanderbilt	L 64–79	10–4 (0–1)	Memorial Gymnasium; Nashville, TN
January 6, 1999		Alabama	W 78–60	11–4 (1–1)	Tad Smith Coliseum; Oxford, MS
January 9, 1999		at No. 19 Arkansas	W 76–65	12–4 (2–1)	Bud Walton Arena; Fayetteville, AR
January 13, 1999		No. 8 Auburn	L 59–74	12–5 (2–2)	Tad Smith Coliseum; Oxford, MS
January 16, 1999		No. 6 Kentucky	L 57–63	12–6 (2–3)	Tad Smith Coliseum; Oxford, MS
January 20, 1999		Mississippi State	W 81–68	13–6 (3–3)	Tad Smith Coliseum; Oxford, MS
January 23, 1999		Georgia	W 85–76	14–6 (4–3)	Tad Smith Coliseum; Oxford, MS
January 27, 1999		at South Carolina	L 66–67	14–7 (4–4)	Carolina Coliseum; Columbia, SC
January 30, 1999		No. 21 Arkansas	W 89–81	15–7 (5–4)	Tad Smith Coliseum; Oxford, MS
February 3, 1999		at LSU	W 82–66	16–7 (6–4)	Pete Maravich Assembly Center; Baton Rouge, LA
February 6, 1999		at Florida	W 79–68	17–7 (7–4)	O'Connell Center; Gainesville, FL
February 9, 1999		at No. 3 Auburn	L 66–95	17–8 (7–5)	Beard–Eaves–Memorial Coliseum; Auburn, AL
February 17, 1999		Tennessee	L 67–69	17–9 (7–6)	Tad Smith Coliseum; Oxford, MS
February 20, 1999		at Mississippi State	L 69–72	17–10 (7–7)	Humphrey Coliseum; Starkville, MS
February 24, 1999		Alabama	L 74–78	17–11 (7–8)	Coleman Coliseum; Tuscaloosa, AL
February 27, 1999		LSU	W 79–57	18–11 (8–8)	Tad Smith Coliseum; Oxford, MS
SEC tournament
March 4, 1999	(3 W)	vs. (6 E) South Carolina	W 64–60	19–11	Georgia Dome; Atlanta, GA
March 5, 1999	(3 W)	vs. (2 E) No. 14 Kentucky	L 73–83	19–12	Georgia Dome; Atlanta, GA
NCAA tournament
March 12, 1999*	(9 MW)	vs. (8 MW) Villanova	W 72–70	20–12	Bradley Center; Milwaukee, WI
March 14, 1999*	(9 MW)	vs. (1 MW) No. 2 Michigan State	L 66–74	20–13	Bradley Center; Milwaukee, WI
*Non-conference game. ^{#}Rankings from AP Poll. (#) Tournament seedings in parentheses. All times are in Central Time.
