= 1999–2000 Illinois State Redbirds men's basketball team =

American college basketball season

1999–2000 Illinois State Redbirds men's basketball
- Conference: Missouri Valley Conference
- Record: 10–20 (5–13 MVC)
- Head coach: Tom Richardson (1st season)
- Assistant coaches: Alvin Williamson; Doug Novsek; Chad Altadonna
- Home arena: Redbird Arena

1999–2000 Missouri Valley Conference men's basketball standings
| | Conf. | | | | Overall |
| Team | W | | L | PCT | W | | L | PCT |
|---|---|---|---|---|---|---|---|---|
| Indiana State | 14 | – | 4 | .778 | 22 | – | 10 | .688 |
| Southwest Missouri State | 13 | – | 5 | .722 | 23 | – | 11 | .676 |
| Southern Illinois | 12 | – | 6 | .667 | 20 | – | 13 | .606 |
| Creighton † | 11 | – | 7 | .611 | 23 | – | 10 | .697 |
| Bradley | 10 | – | 8 | .556 | 14 | – | 16 | .467 |
| Evansville | 9 | – | 9 | .500 | 18 | – | 12 | .600 |
| Northern Iowa | 7 | – | 11 | .389 | 14 | – | 15 | .483 |
| Illinois State | 5 | – | 13 | .278 | 10 | – | 20 | .333 |
| Wichita State | 5 | – | 13 | .278 | 12 | – | 17 | .414 |
| Drake | 4 | – | 14 | .222 | 11 | – | 18 | .379 |
† 2000 MVC tournament winner Rankings from AP Poll

Illinois State Redbirds Wordmark

The 1999–2000 Illinois State Redbirds men's basketball team represented Illinois State University during the 1999–2000 NCAA Division I men's basketball season. The Redbirds, led by first year head coach Tom Richardson, played their home games at Redbird Arena and competed as a member of the Missouri Valley Conference.

They finished the season 10–20, 5–13 in conference play to finish in a tie for eighth place. They were the number eight seed for the Missouri Valley Conference tournament. They were defeated by Wichita State University in their opening round game.

== Roster ==
1999–2000 Illinois State Redbirds men's basketball team
Players
Coaches

| Pos. | # | Name | Height | Weight | Year | Hometown |
|---|---|---|---|---|---|---|
| F | 4 | L. Dee Murdock | 6 ft 9 in (2.06 m) | — | RS Sr | Columbus, KS |
| G | 24 | Marcus Betts | 6 ft 3 in (1.91 m) | — | Sr | Chicago, IL |
| F | 25 | Ryan Crowley | 6 ft 5 in (1.96 m) | — | Sr | Naperville, IL |
| F | 30 | Joe Hein | 6 ft 8 in (2.03 m) | — | Sr | Northbrook, IL |
| F | 54 | Dan Luczywko | 6 ft 8 in (2.03 m) | — | RS Jr | South Milwaukee, WI |
| F | 40 | Rich Beyers | 6 ft 8 in (2.03 m) | — | Jr | Shelbyville, IL |
| G | 12 | Tarise Bryson | 6 ft 1 in (1.85 m) | — | So | Decatur, IL |
| G | 21 | Shawn Jeppson | 6 ft 2 in (1.88 m) | — | So | Spring Valley, IL |
| F | 31 | Chad Mazanowski | 6 ft 6 in (1.98 m) | — | So | DeKalb, IL |
| G | 23 | Traves Wilson (I) | 6 ft 3 in (1.91 m) | — | So | Moline, IL |
| G | 11 | Isaac Kincaid | 6 ft 3 in (1.91 m) | — | RS Fr | Indianapolis, IN |
| F | 44 | Brett Gillan | 6 ft 5 in (1.96 m) | — | Fr | Normal, IL |
| G | 3 | Ishmael Joyce | 6 ft 3 in (1.91 m) | — | Fr | Memphis, TN |
| G | 22 | P. J. Smith | 6 ft 4 in (1.93 m) | — | Fr | Maywood, IL |
| C | 5 | Andy Strandmark | 6 ft 11 in (2.11 m) | — | Fr | Geneseo, IL |

Head coach

- Tom Richardson (Saint Xavier)

Assistant coach(es)

- Alvin Williamson (Tulsa)
- Doug Novsek (Southern Illinois)
- Chad Altadonna (Illinois State)

Legend

- (C) Team captain
- (S) Suspended
- (I) Ineligible
- (W) Walk-on
- Injured
- Current redshirt

== Schedule ==
| Date time, TV | Rank^{#} | Opponent^{#} | Result | Record | High points | High rebounds | High assists | Site (attendance) city, state |
Exhibition Season
| November 9, 1999* | | Brazil Select | W 92–82 | | 26 – Bryson | 12 – Murdock | – | Redbird Arena (5,279); Normal, IL |
| November 16, 1999*; 7:05 pm | | Upstate All–Stars | L 74–77 | | 20 – Murdock | 10 – Smith | – | Redbird Arena (4,704); Normal, IL |
Regular Season
| November 21, 1999* | | at Oakland | W 72–67 | 1–0 | 21 – Bryson | 10 – Luczywko | 3 – Crowley, Kincaid | Athletics Center O'rena (1,352); Auburn Hills, MI |
| November 24, 1999* | | Western Illinois | L 70–72 | 1–1 | 24 – Bryson | 11 – Bryson | 4 – Bryson | Redbird Arena (6,523); Normal, IL |
| November 27, 1999* | | at Akron | L 79–89 | 1–2 | 24 – Bryson | 10 – Murdock | 6 – Bryson | James A. Rhodes Arena (2,556); Akron, OH |
| December 1, 1999* | | at Bowling Green State | L 60–80 | 1–3 | 20 – Murdock | 9 – Murdock | 6 – Bryson | Anderson Arena (2,523); Bowling Green, OH |
| December 4, 1999* | | Central Michigan | W 72–63 | 2–3 | 14 – Crowley, Smith | 12 – Murdock | 4 – Jeppson, Smith | Redbird Arena (6,341); Normal, IL |
| December 7, 1999* | | No. 23 Purdue | L 75–86 | 2–4 | 22 – Bryson | 11 – Murdock | 4 – Jeppson, Kincaid | Redbird Arena (8,860); Normal, IL |
| December 12, 1999; 2:05 pm | | at Creighton | L 43–82 | 2–5 (0–1) | 12 – Murdock | 9 – Murdock | 2 – Bryson | Omaha Civic Auditorium (4,484); Omaha, NE |
| December 20, 1999* | | vs. Virginia Tech; San Juan Shootout [Quarterfinal] | L 71–79 | 2–6 | 18 – Bryson | 5 – Beyers | 4 – Jeppson | Rafael A. Mangual Coliseum (200); Mayagüez, Puerto Rico |
| December 21, 1999* | | at Puerto Rico–Mayagüez; San Juan Shootout [Consolation Semifinal] | W 82–55 | 3–6 | 24 – Murdock | 13 – Murdock | 4 – Crowley | Rafael A. Mangual Coliseum (200); Mayagüez, Puerto Rico |
| December 22, 1999* | | vs. Miami (Florida); San Juan Shootout [Consolation Final] | W 87–78 | 4–6 | 40 – Bryson | 6 – Murdock, Bryson | 8 – Bryson | Rafael A. Mangual Coliseum (123); Mayagüez, Puerto Rico |
| December 28, 1999* | | Northeastern | W 83–58 | 5–6 | 32 – Bryson | 9 – Murdock | 4 – Crowley, Smith | Redbird Arena (6,012); Normal, IL |
| December 30, 1999* | | at Illinois–Chicago | L 59–61 | 5–7 | 21 – Murdock | 8 – Murdock | 5 – Bryson | UIC Pavilion (4,040); Chicago, IL |
| January 5, 2000 | | Southern Illinois | L 72–77 | 5–8 (0–2) | 21 – Bryson | 8 – Beyers | 5 – Bryson | Redbird Arena (6,293); Normal, IL |
| January 8, 2000 | | at Evansville | L 75–90 | 5–9 (0–3) | 19 – Smith | 9 – Smith | 4 – Betts, Bryson | Roberts Municipal Stadium (10,179); Evansville, IN |
| January 12, 2000 | | Indiana State | L 54–56 | 5–10 (0–4) | 16 – Murdock | 7 – Crowley | 4 – Bryson | Redbird Arena (5,490); Normal, IL |
| January 15, 2000 | | at Northern Iowa | L 56–58 | 5–11 (0–5) | 11 – Bryson, Jeppson | 9 – Strandmark | 4 – Crowley, Jeppson | UNI Dome (2,847); Cedar Falls, IA |
| January 17, 2000 | | at Drake | L 46–69 | 5–12 (0–6) | 23 – Bryson | 9 – Strandmark | 2 – Bryson, Strandmark | The Knapp Center (3,532); Des Monies, IA |
| January 22, 2000 | | Southwest Missouri State | W 62–54 | 6–12 (1–6) | 25 – Bryson | 13 – Strandmark | 3 – Crowley | Redbird Arena (7,296); Normal, IL |
| January 26, 2000; WEEK | | at Bradley | L 68–71 ^{OT} | 6–13 (1–7) | 27 – Bryson | 7 – Bryson, Smith | 6 – Bryson | Carver Arena (10,683); Peoria, IL |
| January 29, 2000 | | Northern Iowa | W 60–56 | 7–13 (2–7) | 20 – Bryson | 9 – Strandmark | 2 – Beyers | Redbird Arena (5,868); Normal, IL |
| February 2, 2000 | | at Indiana State | L 57–77 | 7–14 (2–8) | 16 – Bryson | 5 – Smith | 5 – Bryson | Hulman Center (7,067); Terre Haute, IN |
| February 5, 2000; 7:05 pm | | Creighton | L 83–86 | 7–15 (2–9) | 31 – Bryson | 8 – Mazanowski | 4 – Bryson | Redbird Arena (7,438); Normal, IL |
| February 8, 2000; WMBD | | Bradley | W 75–74 ^{OT} | 8–15 (3–9) | 25 – Bryson | 8 – Mazanowski | 3 – Crowley | Redbird Arena (7,822); Normal, IL |
| February 12, 2000 | | at Southern Illinois | L 54–65 | 8–16 (3–10) | 13 – Bryson | 7 – Beyers | 3 – Beyers | SIU Arena (6,310); Carbondale, IL |
| February 16, 2000; 7:35 pm | | at Wichita State | L 56–73 | 8–17 (3–11) | 11 – Joyce | 8 – Mazanowski | 3 – Beyers, Bryson | Henry Levitt Arena (6,678); Wichita, KS |
| February 20, 2000 | | Evansville | L 69–76 | 8–18 (3–12) | 18 – Bryson | 6 – Beyers | 5 – Jeppson | Redbird Arena (6,652); Normal, IL |
| February 23, 2000; 7:05 pm | | Wichita State | W 76–63 | 9–18 (4–12) | 19 – Jeppson | 5 – Luczywko, Jeppson | 4 – Bryson | Redbird Arena (5,191); Normal, IL |
| February 26, 2000 | | at Southwest Missouri State | L 60–70 | 9–19 (4–13) | 21 – Smith | 7 – Luczywko | 4 – Bryson, Smith | John Q. Hammons Student Center (9,013); Springfield, MO |
| February 28, 2000 | | Drake | W 90–88 ^{OT} | 10–19 (5–13) | 35 – Bryson | 6 – Smith | 4 – Bryson | Redbird Arena (5,238); Normal, IL |
Diet Pepsi Missouri Valley Conference {MVC} tournament
| March 3, 2000*; 6:05 pm | (8) | vs. (9) Wichita State; Opening Round | L 55–70 | 10–20 | 16 – Bryson | 7 – Strandmark | 3 – Bryson | Kiel Center (6,725); St. Louis, MO |
*Non-conference game. ^{#}Rankings from AP Poll. (#) Tournament seedings in parentheses. All times are in Central Standard Time.
