= 1998–99 Illinois State Redbirds men's basketball team =

American college basketball season

1998–99 Illinois State Redbirds men's basketball

Hawai'i Pacific Shootout champion
- Conference: Missouri Valley Conference
- Record: 16–15 (7–11 MVC)
- Head coach: Kevin Stallings (6th season)
- Assistant coaches: Tom Richardson; Chad Altadonna; Alvin Williamson
- Home arena: Redbird Arena

1998–99 Missouri Valley Conference men's basketball standings
	Conf.				Overall
Team	W		L	PCT	W		L	PCT
Evansville	13	–	5	.722	23	–	10	.697
Creighton †	11	–	7	.611	22	–	9	.710
Southwest Missouri State	11	–	7	.611	22	–	11	.667
Bradley	11	–	7	.611	17	–	12	.586
Southern Illinois	10	–	8	.556	15	–	12	.556
Indiana State	10	–	8	.556	15	–	12	.556
Illinois State	7	–	11	.389	16	–	15	.516
Wichita State	6	–	12	.333	13	–	17	.433
Northern Iowa	6	–	12	.333	9	–	18	.333
Drake	5	–	13	.278	10	–	17	.370
† 1999 MVC tournament winner Rankings from AP Poll

The 1998–99 Illinois State Redbirds men's basketball team represented Illinois State University during the 1998–99 NCAA Division I men's basketball season. The Redbirds, led by sixth year head coach Kevin Stallings, played their home games at Redbird Arena and competed as a member of the Missouri Valley Conference.

They finished the season 16–15, 7–11 in conference play to finish in seventh place. They were the number seven seed for the Missouri Valley Conference tournament. They were victorious over Drake University in their opening round game but defeated by Creighton University in their quarterfinal game.

== Roster ==
1998–99 Illinois State Redbirds men's basketball team
Players
Coaches

Pos.	#	Name	Height	Weight	Year	Hometown
F	23	Kenneth Pierson	6 ft 8 in (2.03 m)	—	RS Sr	Conroe, TX
C	32	LeRoy Watkins	6 ft 7 in (2.01 m)	—	RS Sr	Chicago, IL
G	24	Kyle Cartmill	6 ft 0 in (1.83 m)	—	Sr	Quincy, IL
C	33	Ronald vanVelzen	6 ft 10 in (2.08 m)	—	Sr	Noordwijk, Netherlands
F	50	L. Dee Murdock	6 ft 9 in (2.06 m)	—	RS Jr	Columbus, KS
C	55	Sean Riley	7 ft 0 in (2.13 m)	—	RS Jr	Houston, TX
F	5	Tyrone Brown	6 ft 5 in (1.96 m)	—	Jr	Wichita, KS
F	25	Ryan Crowley	6 ft 5 in (1.96 m)	—	Jr	Naperville, IL
F	30	Joe Hein	6 ft 8 in (2.03 m)	—	Jr	Northbrook, IL
F	54	Dan Luczywko (I)	6 ft 8 in (2.03 m)	—	Jr	South Milwaukee, WI
G	12	Tarise Bryson	6 ft 1 in (1.85 m)	—	Fr	Decatur, IL
G	21	Shawn Jeppson	6 ft 2 in (1.88 m)	—	Fr	Spring Valley, IL
G	11	Isaac Kincaid (redshirt)	6 ft 3 in (1.91 m)	—	Fr	Indianapolis, IN
F	31	Chad Mazanowski	6 ft 6 in (1.98 m)	—	Fr	DeKalb, IL
G	3	Victor Williams	5 ft 10 in (1.78 m)	—	Fr	Kansas City, KS

Head coach

- Kevin Stallings (Purdue)

Assistant coach(es)

- Tom Richardson (Saint Xavier)
- Chad Altadonna (Illinois State)
- Alvin Williamson (Tulsa)

Legend

- (C) Team captain
- (S) Suspended
- (I) Ineligible
- (W) Walk-on
- Injured
- Current redshirt

== Schedule ==
Date time, TV	Rank^{#}	Opponent^{#}	Result	Record	High points	High rebounds	High assists	Site (attendance) city, state
Exhibition Season
November 5, 1998*		Team Fokus	W 92–84		25 – Bryson	10 – Watkins	–	Redbird Arena (5,183); Normal, IL
November 10, 1998*		Ural Great–Russia	W 89–79		22 – Cartmill	–	–	Redbird Arena (5,144); Normal, IL
Regular Season
November 15, 1998*		Oakland	L 71–72	0–1	19 – Williams	7 – Williams	3 – Watkins, Williams	Redbird Arena (6,561); Normal, IL
November 18, 1998*; 7:05 pm		Wisconsin–Green Bay	W 60–49	1–1	23 – Bryson	8 – Murdock	5 – Williams	Redbird Arena (8,119); Normal, IL
November 20, 1998*; 7:05 pm		Akron	W 84–69	2–1	17 – Bryson	9 – Riley	4 – Bryson	Redbird Arena (6,699); Normal, IL
November 27, 1998*; 2:00 pm		vs. Missouri–Kansas City; Hawai'i Pacific Shootout [Quarterfinal]	W 50–48	3–1	13 – Bryson	10 – Murdock	3 – Williams	Neal S. Blaisdell Arena (1,650); Honolulu, HI
November 28, 1998*; 2:00 pm		vs. Southern Mississippi; Hawai'i Pacific Shootout [Semifinal]	W 86–75	4–1	28 – Bryson	7 – Bryson	3 – Cartmill	Neal S. Blaisdell Arena (1,625); Honolulu, HI
November 29, 1998*; 5:30 pm		vs. Iona; Hawai'i Pacific Shootout [Final]	W 83–75	5–1	18 – Bryson	7 – Watkins, Murdock	4 – Williams	Neal S. Blaisdell Arena (1,650); Honolulu, HI
December 2, 1998*		Alcorn State	W 86–73	6–1	25 – Watkins	8 – Bryson	8 – Cartmill	Redbird Arena (6,239); Normal, IL
December 5, 1998*; 7:05 pm		Wisconsin	L 54–71	6–2	28 – Bryson	6 – Riley	3 – Riley, Williams	Redbird Arena (9,533); Normal, IL
December 9, 1998*		at No. 9 Purdue	L 55–69	6–3	12 – Murdock	5 – Cartmill, Murdock	3 – Bryson	Mackey Arena (14,123); West Lafayette, IN
December 12, 1998; 5:05 pm		Wichita State	W 68–61	7–3 (1–0)	16 – Cartmill	7 – Bryson	4 – Cartmill, Williams	Redbird Arena (6,247); Normal, IL
December 19, 1998		at Drake	W 74–66	8–3 (2–0)	20 – Bryson	9 – Murdock	4 – Cartmill, Murdock	The Knapp Center (5,628); Des Monies, IA
December 23, 1998*		Illinois–Chicago	W 79–67	9–3	18 – Bryson	8 – Watkins, Murdock	6 – Cartmill, Williams	Redbird Arena (6,261); Normal, IL
December 29, 1998*		Eastern Illinois	W 76–65	10–3	18 – Bryson	11 – Watkins	6 – Cartmill, Riley, Bryson	Redbird Arena (8,237); Normal, IL
January 2, 1999; 1:05 pm, ESPN2		at Wichita State	L 67–72	10–4 (2–1)	27 – Murdock	9 – Murdock	6 – Bryson	Henry Levitt Arena (7,436); Wichita, KS
January 5, 1999		at Southwest Missouri State	L 68–71	10–5 (2–2)	25 – Bryson	12 – Murdock	2 – Cartmill, Riley, Bryson	John Q. Hammons Student Center (6,865); Springfield, MO
January 9, 1999		Northern Iowa	L 59–69	10–6 (2–3)	14 – Murdock, Bryson	5 – Pierson, Murdock	3 – Bryson	Redbird Arena (6,847); Normal, IL
January 13, 1999		Drake	W 75–57	11–6 (3–3)	23 – Riley	9 – Murdock	6 – Cartmill	Redbird Arena (6,297); Normal, IL
January 16, 1999		at Evansville	W 81–80	12–6 (4–3)	24 – Murdock	8 – Murdock	5 – Bryson	Roberts Municipal Stadium (10,208); Evansville, IN
January 20, 1999; WMBD		Bradley	L 68–69	12–7 (4–4)	20 – Murdock, Riley	8 – Riley	5 – Cartmill	Redbird Arena (9,137); Normal, IL
January 23, 1999; 7:05 pm		at Creighton	L 84–95	12–8 (4–5)	24 – Bryson	7 – Murdock	9 – Bryson	Omaha Civic Auditorium (7,411); Omaha, NE
January 27, 1999		Indiana State	L 67–77	12–9 (4–6)	16 – Bryson	4 – Watkins, Murdock, Brown	3 – Watkins, Riley, Williams	Redbird Arena (7,790); Normal, IL
January 30, 1999		at Southern Illinois	L 49–60	12–10 (4–7)	17 – Riley	8 – Watkins	4 – Williams	SIU Arena (4,280); Carbondale, IL
February 3, 1999		Southwest Missouri State	W 62–54	13–10 (5–7)	19 – Bryson	7 – Cartmill, Riley	5 – Williams	Redbird Arena (7,310); Normal, IL
February 7, 1999		Southern Illinois	L 63–69	13–11 (5–8)	17 – Watkins	8 – Riley	3 – Bryson	Redbird Arena (8,283); Normal, IL
February 10, 1999; WEEK		at Bradley	L 70–74 ^{OT}	13–12 (5–9)	22 – Bryson	5 – Pierson, Riley	4 – Williams	Carver Arena (11,030); Peoria, IL
February 14, 1999; 12:35 pm, ESPN		Creighton	W 79–77	14–12 (6–9)	18 – Riley	8 – Watkins, Riley	7 – Williams	Redbird Arena (8,075); Normal, IL
February 17, 1999		at Northern Iowa	L 66–78	14–13 (6–10)	22 – Riley	9 – Riley	6 – Williams	UNI Dome (1,719); Cedar Falls, IA
February 20, 1999		Evansville	W 79–68	15–13 (7–10)	18 – Williams	8 – Watkins, Williams	4 – Riley	Redbird Arena (8,723); Normal, IL
February 22, 1999		at Indiana State	L 64–65	15–14 (7–11)	25 – Williams	8 – Cartmill	6 – Bryson	Hulman Center (6,653); Terre Haute, IN
Diet Pepsi Missouri Valley Conference {MVC} tournament
February 26, 1999*; 8:35 pm	(7)	vs. (10) Drake; Opening Round	W 51–47	16–14	17 – Watkins	10 – Riley	4 – Bryson	Kiel Center (6,894); St. Louis, MO
February 27, 1999*; 6:05 pm	(7)	vs. (2) Creighton; Quarterfinal	L 63–68	16–15	16 – Crowley, Williams	9 – Watkins	7 – Williams	Kiel Center (11,129); St. Louis, MO
*Non-conference game. ^{#}Rankings from AP Poll. (#) Tournament seedings in parentheses. All times are in Central Standard Time.
