= 1999–2000 Creighton Bluejays men's basketball team =

American college basketball season

1999–2000 Creighton Bluejays men's basketball
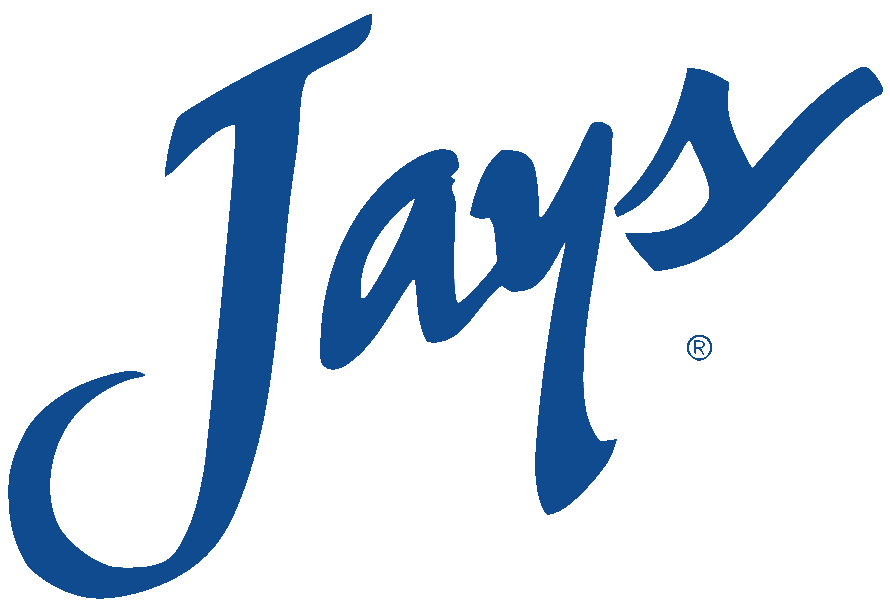

MVC tournament champion

NCAA tournament, first round
- Conference: Missouri Valley Conference
- Record: 23–10 (11–7 MVC)
- Head coach: Dana Altman (6th year)
- Assistant coaches: Greg Grensing (6th year); Len Gordy (6th year); Darian DeVries (2nd year)
- Home arena: Omaha Civic Auditorium

1999–2000 Missouri Valley Conference men's basketball standings
	Conf.				Overall
Team	W		L	PCT	W		L	PCT
Indiana State	14	–	4	.778	22	–	10	.688
Southwest Missouri State	13	–	5	.722	23	–	11	.676
Southern Illinois	12	–	6	.667	20	–	13	.606
Creighton †	11	–	7	.611	23	–	10	.697
Bradley	10	–	8	.556	14	–	16	.467
Evansville	9	–	9	.500	18	–	12	.600
Northern Iowa	7	–	11	.389	14	–	15	.483
Illinois State	5	–	13	.278	10	–	20	.333
Wichita State	5	–	13	.278	12	–	17	.414
Drake	4	–	14	.222	11	–	18	.379
† 2000 MVC tournament winner Rankings from AP Poll

The 1999–2000 Creighton Bluejays men's basketball team represented Creighton University during the 1999–2000 NCAA Division I men's basketball season. The Bluejays, led by head coach Dana Altman, played their home games at the Omaha Civic Auditorium. The Jays finished with a 23-10 record, and won the Missouri Valley Conference tournament to earn an automatic bid to the 2001 NCAA tournament.

== Roster ==
1999–2000 Creighton Bluejays men's basketball team
Players
Coaches

Pos.	#	Name	Height	Weight	Year	Previous school	Hometown
G	3	Matt West	6 ft 4 in (1.93 m)	190 lb (86 kg)	Sr	Westside HS	Omaha, NE
G	4	Ben Walker	6 ft 2 in (1.88 m)	205 lb (93 kg)	Jr		Oak Creek, WI
G	5	Ryan Sears	6 ft 0 in (1.83 m)	185 lb (84 kg)	Jr	Ankeny HS	Ankeny, IA
G	23	Terrell Taylor	6 ft 3 in (1.91 m)	200 lb (91 kg)	Fr		Bridgeport, CT
F	25	Kyle Korver	6 ft 7 in (2.01 m)	210 lb (95 kg)	Fr	Pella HS	Pella, IA
F	55	Nerijus Karlikanovas	6 ft 8 in (2.03 m)	220 lb (100 kg)	Sr		Raseiniai, Lithuania

Head coach

- Dana Altman (Eastern New Mexico)

Assistant coach(es)

- Greg Grensing
- Len Gordy
- Darian DeVries (Northern Iowa)

Legend

- (C) Team captain
- (S) Suspended
- (I) Ineligible
- (W) Walk-on
- Injured
- Current redshirt

== Schedule and results ==
Date time, TV	Rank^{#}	Opponent^{#}	Result	Record	Site (attendance) city, state
Regular season
Nov 22, 1999*		Mississippi Valley State	W 70–62	1–0	Omaha Civic Auditorium; Omaha, Nebraska
Nov 27, 1999*		No. 23 Iowa	W 85–76	2–0	Omaha Civic Auditorium (–); Omaha, NE
Dec 1, 1999*		at Georgia State	W 58–54	3–0	GSU Sports Arena; Statesboro, Georgia
Dec 4, 1999*		at Baylor	W 77–76 ^{OT}	4–0	Ferrell Center; Waco, Texas
Dec 6, 1999*		Grambling State	W 91–52	5–0	Omaha Civic Auditorium; Omaha, Nebraska
Dec 9, 1999*		Nebraska; Rivalry	W 89–72	6–0	Omaha Civic Auditorium; Omaha, Nebraska
Dec 12, 1999		Illinois State	W 82–43	7–0 (1–0)	Omaha Civic Auditorium; Omaha, Nebraska
Dec 20, 1999*		vs. Western Illinois	W 76–72	8–0	Stan Sheriff Center; Honolulu, Hawaii
Dec 21, 1999*		vs. Florida Atlantic	W 66–46	9–0	Stan Sheriff Center; Honolulu, Hawaii
Dec 22, 1999*		at Hawaii	L 53–73	9–1	Stan Sheriff Center; Honolulu, Hawaii
Dec 29, 1999		Southwest Missouri State	L 58–59	9–2 (1–1)	Omaha Civic Auditorium; Omaha, Nebraska
Jan 2, 2000		at Northern Iowa	L 75–77	9–3 (1–2)	UNI-Dome; Cedar Falls, Iowa
Jan 6, 2000		at Indiana State	L 46–56	9–4 (1–3)	Hulman Center; Terre Haute, Indiana
Jan 8, 2000		at Southern Illinois	W 72–66	10–4 (2–3)	SIU Arena; Carbondale, Illinois
Jan 12, 2000*		No. 19 Tulsa	L 67–75	10–5	Omaha Civic Auditorium (–); Omaha, NE
Jan 15, 2000		Drake	W 70–66	11–5 (3–3)	Omaha Civic Auditorium; Omaha, Nebraska
Jan 19, 2000		at Southwest Missouri State	W 63–49	12–5 (4–3)	Hammons Student Center; Springfield, Missouri
Jan 23, 2000		at Evansville	L 83–88	12–6 (4–4)	Roberts Municipal Stadium; Evansville, Indiana
Jan 26, 2000		Northern Iowa	W 77–73 ^{OT}	13–6 (5–4)	Omaha Civic Auditorium; Omaha, Nebraska
Jan 29, 2000		Wichita State	W 88–72	14–6 (6–4)	Omaha Civic Auditorium; Omaha, Nebraska
Feb 1, 2000		at Drake	L 70–74 ^{OT}	14–7 (6–5)	Knapp Center; Des Moines, Iowa
Feb 5, 2000		at Illinois State	W 86–83	15–7 (7–5)	Redbird Arena; Normal, Illinois
Feb 7, 2000*		at Colorado State	W 78–67	16–7	Moby Arena; Fort Collins, Colorado
Feb 13, 2000		Bradley	W 73–56	17–7 (8–5)	Omaha Civic Auditorium; Omaha, Nebraska
Feb 16, 2000		Indiana State	W 64–58	18–7 (9–5)	Omaha Civic Auditorium; Omaha, Nebraska
Feb 19, 2000		Southern Illinois	L 83–92	18–8 (9–6)	Omaha Civic Auditorium; Omaha, Nebraska
Feb 23, 2000		at Bradley	L 65–73	18–9 (9–7)	Carver Arena; Peoria, Illinois
Feb 26, 2000		at Wichita State	W 75–64	19–9 (10–7)	Levitt Arena; Wichita, Kansas
Feb 28, 2000		Evansville	W 102–69	20–9 (11–7)	Omaha Civic Auditorium; Hampton, Virginia
Missouri Valley Conference tournament
03/4/2000*	(4)	vs. (5) Bradley; MVC Tournament Quarterfinal	W 71-62	21–9	Savvis Center (–); St. Louis, MO
03/5/2000*	(4)	vs. (1) Indiana State; MVC Tournament Semifinal	W 71–69	22–9	Savvis Center (–); St. Louis, MO
03/6/2000*	(4)	vs. (2) Missouri State; MVC Championship	W 57–45	23–9	Savvis Center (–); St. Louis, MO
2000 NCAA tournament
03/16/2000*; CBS	(10 MW)	vs. (7 MW) No. 24 Auburn; First Round	L 69–72	23–10	Hubert H. Humphrey Metrodome (–); Minneapolis, MN
*Non-conference game. ^{#}Rankings from AP. (#) Tournament seedings in parentheses. MW=Midwest. All times are in Central.
