= 1998–99 Evansville Purple Aces men's basketball team =

American college basketball season

1998–99 Evansville Purple Aces men's basketball

MVC Regular season champions

NCAA tournament, first round
- Conference: Missouri Valley Conference
- Record: 23–10 (13–5 MVC)
- Head coach: Jim Crews (14th season)
- Home arena: Roberts Municipal Stadium

1998–99 Missouri Valley Conference men's basketball standings
	Conf.				Overall
Team	W		L	PCT	W		L	PCT
Evansville	13	–	5	.722	23	–	10	.697
Creighton †	11	–	7	.611	22	–	9	.710
Southwest Missouri State	11	–	7	.611	22	–	11	.667
Bradley	11	–	7	.611	17	–	12	.586
Southern Illinois	10	–	8	.556	15	–	12	.556
Indiana State	10	–	8	.556	15	–	12	.556
Illinois State	7	–	11	.389	16	–	15	.516
Wichita State	6	–	12	.333	13	–	17	.433
Northern Iowa	6	–	12	.333	9	–	18	.333
Drake	5	–	13	.278	10	–	17	.370
† 1999 MVC tournament winner Rankings from AP Poll

The 1998–99 Evansville Purple Aces men's basketball team represented the University of Evansville in the 1998–99 NCAA Division I men's basketball season. Their head coach was Jim Crews and they played their home games at Roberts Municipal Stadium as members of the Missouri Valley Conference. After finishing alone atop the MVC regular season standings, the Purple Aces lost in the championship game of the MVC tournament. The Aces received an at-large bid to the 1999 NCAA tournament. They were defeated by No. 6 seed Kansas in the opening round and finished 23–10 (13–5 MVC).

== Roster ==
1998–99 Evansville Purple Aces men's basketball team
Players	Coaches
Pos. / # / Name / Height / Weight / Year / Hometown; G / / Marcus Wilson / 6 ft 3 in (1.91 m) / — / Sr / Rockport, IN	Head coach: Jim Crews (Indiana); Assistant coach(es) Legend: (C) Team captain; (S) Suspended; (I) Ineligible; (W) Walk-on; Injured; Current redshirt

== Schedule ==
Date time, TV	Rank^{#}	Opponent^{#}	Result	Record	Site (attendance) city, state
Regular season
Nov 14, 1998*		Western Kentucky	W 70–65	1–0	Roberts Stadium; Evansville, Indiana
Nov 18, 1998*		at Tennessee-Martin	W 83–70	2–0	Skyhawk Arena; Martin, Tennessee
Nov 22, 1998*		Sacred Heart	W 94–69	3–0	Roberts Stadium; Evansville, Indiana
Nov 27, 1998*		vs. Saint Louis	L 55–85	3–1	Afook-Chinen Civic Auditorium; Hilo, Hawaii
Nov 28, 1998		at Hawaii-Hilo	W 115–74	4–1 (2–0)	Afook-Chinen Civic Auditorium; Hilo, Hawaii
Nov 29, 1998*		vs. New Orleans	W 73–61	5–1	Afook-Chinen Civic Auditorium; Hilo, Hawaii
Dec 5, 1998*		Butler	L 60–66	5–2	Roberts Stadium; Evansville, Indiana
Dec 8, 1998*		at Eastern Illinois	W 85–66	6–2	Lantz Arena; Charleston, Illinois
Dec 12, 1998*		at East Carolina	L 79–82	6–3	Williams Arena at Minges Coliseum; Greenville, North Carolina
Dec 16, 1998*		Tennessee Tech	W 96–56	7–3	Roberts Stadium; Evansville, Indiana
Dec 19, 1998		Indiana State	W 82–75	8–3 (1–0)	Roberts Stadium; Evansville, Indiana
Dec 29, 1998*		at Morehead State	W 75–74	9–3	Ellis T. Johnson Arena; Morehead, Kentucky
Jan 2, 1999		at Drake	W 89–76	10–3 (2–0)	Knapp Center; Des Moines, Iowa
Jan 4, 1999		at Creighton	W 84–79	11–3 (3–0)	Omaha Civic Auditorium; Omaha, Nebraska
Jan 7, 1999		Northern Iowa	W 96–84	12–3 (4–0)	Roberts Stadium
Jan 9, 1999		Wichita State	W 81–73	13–3 (5–0)	Roberts Stadium
Jan 13, 1999		at Northern Iowa	W 74–66	14–3 (6–0)	UNI-Dome; Cedar Falls, Iowa
Jan 16, 1999		Illinois State	L 80–81	14–4 (6–1)	Roberts Stadium
Jan 20, 1999		Creighton	L 80–90	14–5 (6–2)	Roberts Stadium
Jan 23, 1999		at Bradley	L 65–98	14–6 (6–3)	Carver Arena; Peoria, Illinois
Jan 27, 1999		Southern Illinois	W 61–56	15–6 (7–3)	Roberts Stadium
Jan 30, 1999		Drake	W 76–63	16–6 (8–3)	Roberts Stadium
Feb 4, 1999		at Wichita State	W 75–63	17–6 (9–3)	Levitt Arena; Wichita, Kansas
Feb 6, 1999		at SW Missouri State	W 65–62	18–6 (10–3)	Hammons Student Center; Springfield, Missouri
MVC tournament
Feb 27, 1999*		vs. Wichita State; Quarterfinals	W 79–71	22–8	Kiel Center; St. Louis, Missouri
Feb 28, 1999*		vs. Bradley; Semifinals	W 64–63	23–8	Kiel Center; St. Louis, Missouri
Mar 1, 1999*		vs. Creighton; Championship game	L 61–70	23–9	Kiel Center; St. Louis, Missouri
NCAA tournament
Mar 12, 1999*	(11 MW)	vs. (6 MW) No. 22 Kansas; First round	L 74–95	23–10	Louisiana Superdome; New Orleans, Louisiana
*Non-conference game. ^{#}Rankings from AP poll. (#) Tournament seedings in parentheses. MW=Midwest. All times are in Central Standard Time.
