= Dana Altman =

American college basketball coach (born 1958)

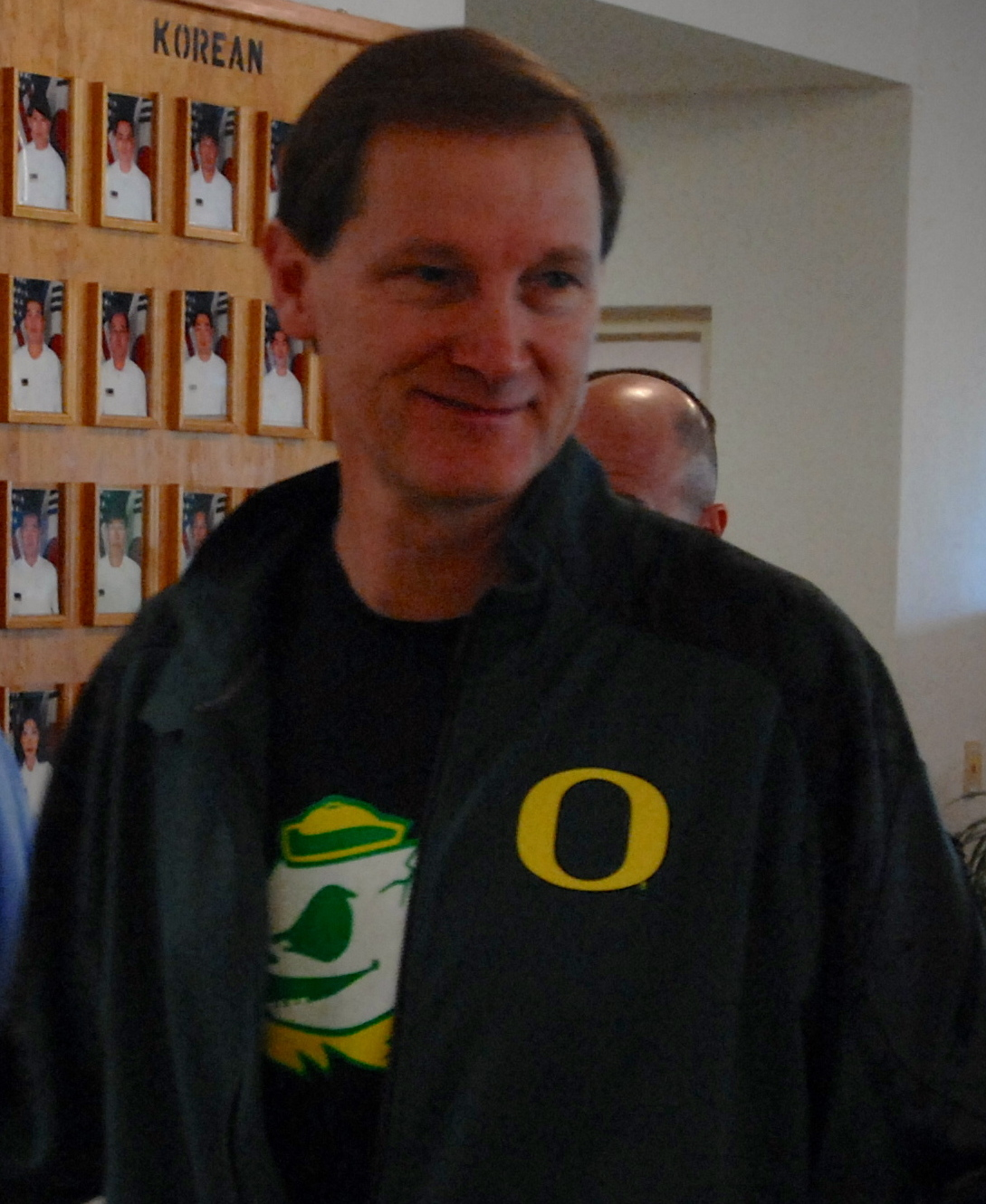
- Altman in 2013

Biographical details
- Born: June 16, 1958 (age 68); Wilber, Nebraska, U.S.
- Education: Eastern New Mexico

Playing career
- 1976–1978: Southeast CC
- 1978–1980: Eastern New Mexico
- Position: Guard

Coaching career (HC unless noted)
- 1980–1982: Western Colorado (assistant)
- 1982–1983: Southeast CC
- 1983–1986: Moberly CC
- 1986–1989: Kansas State (assistant)
- 1989–1990: Marshall
- 1990–1994: Kansas State
- 1994–2010: Creighton
- 2010–2026: Oregon

Head coaching record
- Overall: 792–425 (.651) (NCAA); 123–24 (.837) (NJCAA)
- Tournaments: 18–17 (NCAA Division I); 13–11 (NIT); 2–1 (CIT); 5–1 (CBI)

Accomplishments and honors

Championships
- NCAA Division I tournament Final Four (2017); CBI (2011); 6 MVC tournament (1999, 2000, 2002, 2003, 2005, 2007); 3 MVC regular season (2001, 2002, 2009); 4 Pac-12 tournament (2013, 2016, 2019, 2024); 4 Pac-12 regular season (2016, 2017, 2020, 2021)

Awards
- Jim Phelan Award (2013); SoCon Coach of the Year (1990); Big Eight Coach of the Year (1993); 2× MVC Coach of the Year (2001, 2002); 3× Pac-12 Coach of the Year (2013, 2015, 2016)

Dana Dean Altman (born June 16, 1958) is an American former college basketball coach. He coached the Oregon Ducks from 2010 to 2026, after serving as the head coach at Creighton University for 16 years prior. Altman also led Kansas State University from 1990 to 1994 and started as an NCAA head coach at Marshall University in 1989. He has been honored as a conference coach of the year on each team that he has led, won ten conference tournament championships and seven regular season titles. Altman has reached the NCAA tournament sixteen times, including leading the Ducks to the Final Four in 2017; their first as a program since 1939.

== College education ==
Dana Altman began playing college basketball at Fairbury Junior College (now Southeast Community College) in Fairbury, Nebraska. He earned an associate degree in business administration there in 1978. He then received his undergraduate degree in the same field at Eastern New Mexico University in 1980.

== Coaching career ==
=== Marshall ===
In his first NCAA Division I head coaching position, Altman became the head men's basketball coach at Marshall University in Huntington, West Virginia in 1989. Although he only spent one season as the coach of the Thundering Herd, Altman led the Herd to a 15–13 record and 2nd place in the Southern Conference regular season. Altman left Marshall after one season to replace his mentor, Lon Kruger, at Kansas State.

=== Kansas State ===
Although his four-year tenure as Kansas State's head coach produced one NCAA tournament appearance, Altman will be remembered most for his ability to win close ball games, and for pulling off some of the biggest upsets in school history.

Altman's teams were 28–13 in games decided by six points or less, which included a 6–1 mark in one-point games. His 1992–93 club perpetuated a Kansas State tradition. Picked to finish last in the Big Eight, Altman's Wildcats won 11 games in the final minute, earned the school's first Top 25 ranking in five seasons, finished 19–11, reached the championship game of the Big Eight tournament and returned Kansas State to the NCAA tournament for the 21st time.

Altman's peers named him Big Eight Coach-of-the-Year in 1993 and he capped the season by upsetting No. 6 Kansas 74–67 in the semifinals of the conference tournament.

The following season, he made it two in a row over Kansas when he upset the No. 1 ranked Jayhawks 68–64 in Lawrence. His 1993–94 squad finished the season with a 20–14 record and advanced to the NIT Final Four in New York City. Following the season, he accepted the head coaching position at Creighton, in his home state of Nebraska.

=== Creighton ===
During his time at Creighton, his athletes earned three All-American honors on the court and three other Academic All-America laurels in the classroom. Three players he coached at Creighton, Kyle Korver, Rodney Buford, and Anthony Tolliver, have played in the NBA.

Altman was named Missouri Valley Conference Coach of the Year twice, first in 2001 and also in 2002. Altman was a finalist for the Naismith College Coach of the Year and named the National Association of Basketball Coaches (NABC District 12 and USBWA District VI Coach of the Year in 2002–03.

Altman became the 14th head coach in Creighton history following the 1993–94 season after four years as the head coach at Kansas State. Hired on March 31, 1994, Altman inherited a team that posted a 7–22 ledger the year before his arrival and led the Bluejays to a slightly improved 7–19 record in 1994–95 before his 1995–96 squad jumped to 14–15. In 1996–97, Altman's team was 15–15 and followed with another substantial jump to 18–10 and a bid to the NIT in 1997–98.

On April 2, 2007, Altman announced that he would become the head coach for the Arkansas Razorbacks, in a deal that was rumored to be a $1.5 million per year, 5-year contract. Only one day later he had a change of heart and returned to Omaha and his team at Creighton, citing family reasons. He had not consulted his wife or high school age daughter prior to accepting the job.

On February 5, 2009, Altman won his 300th game as Creighton head coach. In his first 13 years at Creighton, Altman ranked third all-time on the coaching victories list in the 99-year history of the Missouri Valley Conference, trailing only Hall of Fame coaches Henry Iba and Eddie Hickey. His record in 16 seasons with the Creighton Bluejays was 327–176 (.650), the second most wins in school history.

=== Oregon ===
On April 24, 2010, Altman agreed to a 7-year contract worth nearly $2 million per year with Oregon. The university made it official on April 26 with a press conference. As of 2020, he is the currently highest-paid public employee of the state of Oregon.

Under Dana Altman, the University of Oregon was consistently one of the top basketball schools in the Pac-12, with notable conference achievements including three regular season Pac-12 Conference championships (2016, 2017, 2019), and four Pac-12 tournament championships (2013, 2016, 2019, 2024). His prior coaching experience playing against UCLA was one of the main reasons why Oregon recruited him, as the Ducks wanted to improve standings. Altman also led the Ducks to success in the NCAA tournament, including a Final Four run in 2017.

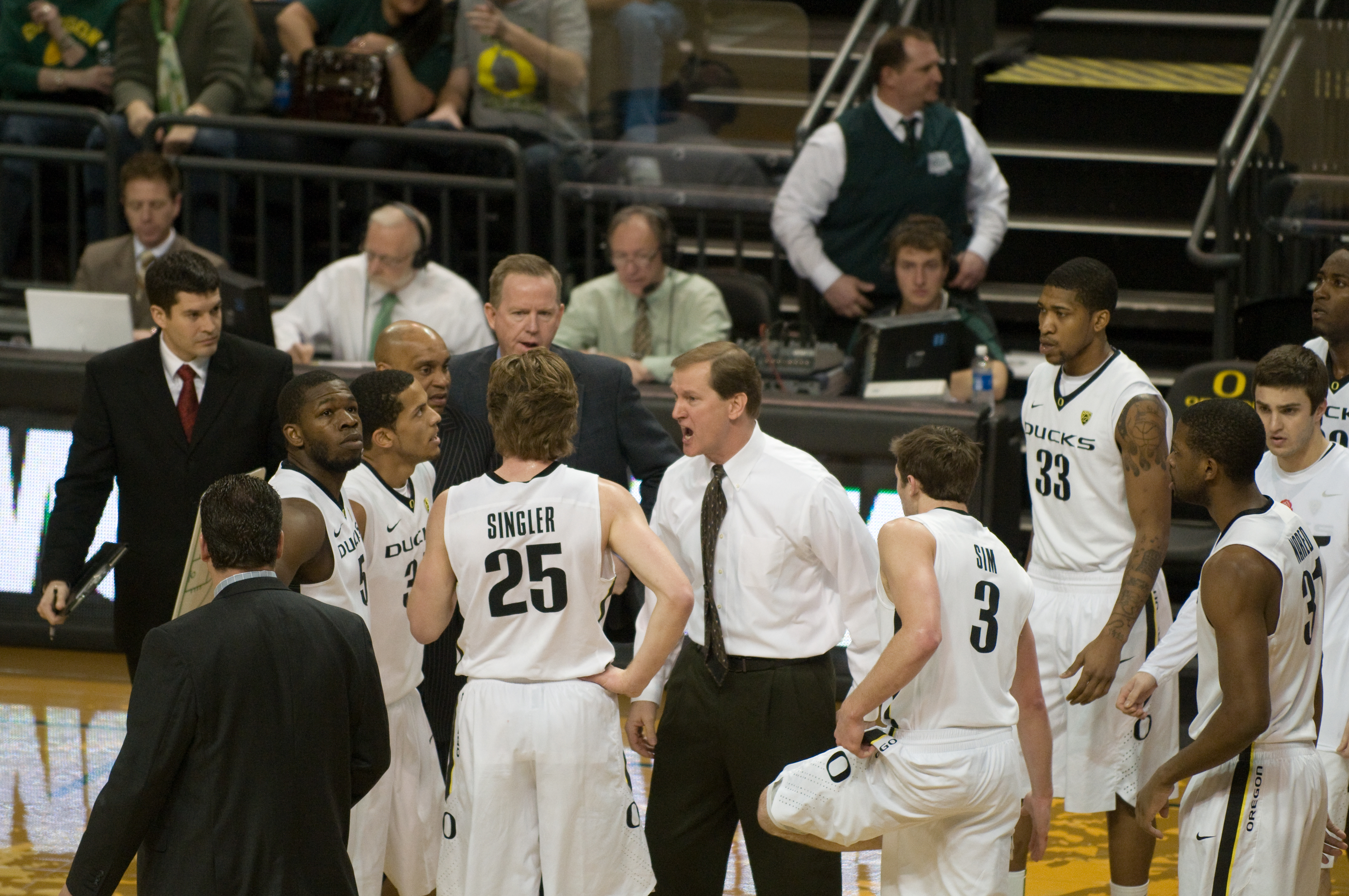
Altman coaching Oregon during the 2011–12 season

In 2013 Oregon earned its first NCAA tournament bid under Dana Altman. This run ended in the sweet sixteen. Oregon continued this success, making the NCAA tournament in 2014 and 2015. Both the 2013–14 and 2014–15 seasons ended in the round of 32.

On March 13, 2016, Oregon earned its first #1 seed in the NCAA tournament in program history thanks to winning the Pac-12 regular season and conference tournament titles. On February 28, 2024, Altman hit 750 career wins in a 78–71 win over rival Oregon State.

On March 26, 2016, the Oregon Ducks lost, as a #1 seed in the Elite Eight to the #2 seeded Oklahoma Sooners due in large part to a lights out shooting performance by Buddy Hield.

On November 11, 2016, Oregon and Altman agreed on a seven-year contract extension that will keep him in Eugene through the 2022–2023 season.

On March 25, 2017, Altman led the #3 seeded Ducks to their first Final Four in 78 years with a 74–60 upset over #1 seed Kansas in Kansas City. This was Altman's first Final Four appearance. Oregon would go on to lose in the Final Four to end what was considered a massively successful season for Altman and the Ducks.

On November 17, 2017, Altman won his 600th career Division I game in a 114–56 Ducks win over Alabama State.

On March 14, 2019, Oregon and Altman agreed on a three-year contract extension that will keep him in Eugene through the 2025–2026 season. Two weeks later, Altman notched his 235th win at Oregon with a victory over UC Irvine in the second round of the NCAA Tournament, tying Ernie Kent as the winningest coach in school history. He broke the record with Oregon's first win of the following season, over Fresno State on November 5, 2019.

On October 7, 2026, Altman announced his retirement. His longtime assistant Tony Stubblefield was named the interim coach following his retirement.

== Personal life ==
Altman was born in Wilber, Nebraska. He and his wife Reva have four children. Altman, who had been an Eagle Scout in the Boy Scouts of America, received a Distinguished Eagle Scout Award in 2008.

== Controversies ==
Altman has had issues in at least two instances at his time in Oregon regarding alleged cases of sexual assault perpetrated by players under his watch. The first instance was Brandon Austin, who was recruited from Providence College by Altman, despite the coach knowing about Austin's previous suspension from that institution due to allegations of sexual assault. Austin would be accused of rape in 2014 while a player on the team, and while no charges were filed, the accuser would settle a suit with the University for $800,000. Another player, Kavell Bigby-Williams, played the 2016-17 season while under investigation for sexual assault at his previous institution, with the charges later being dropped.

== Head coaching record ==
=== NJCAA ===
Record table
Season	Team	Overall	Conference	Standing	Postseason
Southeast Bobcats (Nebraska Community College Athletic Conference) (1982–1983)
1982–83	Southeast	29–6			NJCAA Tournament
Southeast JC:		29–6 (.829)			
Moberly Greyhounds (Missouri Community College Athletic Conference) (1983–1986)
1983–84	Moberly	25–9			
1984–85	Moberly	35–5			NJCAA Tournament
1985–86	Moberly	34–4			NJCAA Tournament
Moberly:		94–18 (.839)			
Total:		123–24 (.837)			
National champion Postseason invitational champion Conference regular season champion Conference regular season and conference tournament champion Division regular season champion Division regular season and conference tournament champion Conference tournament champion

=== NCAA ===
Record table
Season	Team	Overall	Conference	Standing	Postseason
Marshall Thundering Herd (Southern Conference) (1989–1990)
1989–90	Marshall	15–13	9–5	2nd	
Marshall:		15–13 (.536)	9–5 (.643)		
Kansas State Wildcats (Big Eight Conference) (1990–1994)
1990–91	Kansas State	13–15	3–11	8th	
1991–92	Kansas State	16–14	5–9	T–6th	NIT Second Round
1992–93	Kansas State	19–11	7–7	T–5th	NCAA Division I Round of 64
1993–94	Kansas State	20–14	4–10	T–6th	NIT Semifinal
Kansas State:		68–54 (.557)	19–37 (.339)		
Creighton Bluejays (Missouri Valley Conference) (1994–2010)
1994–95	Creighton	7–19	4–14	T–9th	
1995–96	Creighton	14–15	9–9	T–5th	
1996–97	Creighton	15–15	10–8	T–6th	
1997–98	Creighton	18–10	12–6	2nd	NIT First Round
1998–99	Creighton	22–9	11–7	T–2nd	NCAA Division I Round of 32
1999–2000	Creighton	23–10	11–7	4th	NCAA Division I Round of 64
2000–01	Creighton	24–8	14–4	1st	NCAA Division I Round of 64
2001–02	Creighton	23–9	14–4	T–1st	NCAA Division I Round of 32
2002–03	Creighton	29–5	15–3	2nd	NCAA Division I Round of 64
2003–04	Creighton	20–9	12–6	T–2nd	NIT First Round
2004–05	Creighton	23–11	11–7	T–3rd	NCAA Division I Round of 64
2005–06	Creighton	20–10	12–6	T–2nd	NIT Second Round
2006–07	Creighton	22–11	13–5	2nd	NCAA Division I Round of 64
2007–08	Creighton	22–11	10–8	4th	NIT Second Round
2008–09	Creighton	27–8	14–4	T–1st	NIT Second Round
2009–10	Creighton	18–16	10–8	4th	CIT Semifinal
Creighton:		327–176 (.650)	182–106 (.632)		
Oregon Ducks (Pacific-10/Pac-12 Conference) (2010–2024)
2010–11	Oregon	21–18	7–11	T–7th	CBI Champion
2011–12	Oregon	24–10	13–5	T–2nd	NIT Quarterfinal
2012–13	Oregon	28–9	12–6	T–2nd	NCAA Division I Sweet 16
2013–14	Oregon	24–10	10–8	T–3rd	NCAA Division I Round of 32
2014–15	Oregon	26–10	13–5	T–2nd	NCAA Division I Round of 32
2015–16	Oregon	31–7	14–4	1st	NCAA Division I Elite Eight
2016–17	Oregon	33–6	16–2	T–1st	NCAA Division I Final Four
2017–18	Oregon	23–13	10–8	T–6th	NIT Second Round
2018–19	Oregon	25–13	10–8	T–4th	NCAA Division I Sweet 16
2019–20	Oregon	24–7	13–5	1st	NCAA Division I Canceled
2020–21	Oregon	21–7	14–4	1st	NCAA Division I Sweet 16
2021–22	Oregon	20–15	11–9	5th	NIT Second Round
2022–23	Oregon	21–15	12–8	4th	NIT Quarterfinals
2023–24	Oregon	24–12	12–8	4th	NCAA Division I Round of 32
Oregon Ducks (Big Ten Conference) (2024–2026)
2024–25	Oregon	25–10	12–8	T–7th	NCAA Division I Round of 32
2025–26	Oregon	12–20	5–15	T-15th	
Oregon:		382–182 (.677)	185–114 (.619)		
Total:		792–425 (.651)			
National champion Postseason invitational champion Conference regular season champion Conference regular season and conference tournament champion Division regular season champion Division regular season and conference tournament champion Conference tournament champion

== See also ==
- List of college men's basketball coaches with 600 wins
- List of NCAA Division I Men's Final Four appearances by coach
