= 1998–99 Southwest Missouri State Bears basketball team =

American college basketball season

1998–99 Southwest Missouri State Bears men's basketball

NCAA tournament, Sweet Sixteen
- Conference: Missouri Valley Conference

Ranking
- Coaches: No. 24
- Record: 22–11 (11–7 MVC)
- Head coach: Steve Alford (4th season)
- Assistant coach: Brian Jones (1st season)
- Home arena: Hammons Student Center

1998–99 Missouri Valley Conference men's basketball standings
	Conf.				Overall
Team	W		L	PCT	W		L	PCT
Evansville	13	–	5	.722	23	–	10	.697
Creighton †	11	–	7	.611	22	–	9	.710
Southwest Missouri State	11	–	7	.611	22	–	11	.667
Bradley	11	–	7	.611	17	–	12	.586
Southern Illinois	10	–	8	.556	15	–	12	.556
Indiana State	10	–	8	.556	15	–	12	.556
Illinois State	7	–	11	.389	16	–	15	.516
Wichita State	6	–	12	.333	13	–	17	.433
Northern Iowa	6	–	12	.333	9	–	18	.333
Drake	5	–	13	.278	10	–	17	.370
† 1999 MVC tournament winner Rankings from AP Poll

The 1998–99 Southwest Missouri State Bears basketball team represented Southwest Missouri State University in National Collegiate Athletic Association (NCAA) Division I men's basketball during the 1998–99 season. Playing in the Missouri Valley Conference and led by head coach Steve Alford, the Bears finished the season with a 22–11 overall record (11–7 MVC).

In a season marked by several close losses (and wins), Southwest Missouri State received an at-large bid to the NCAA tournament as the No. 12 seed in the East region, where the Bears made a surprising run to the second weekend of the tournament. The Bears first defeated 5th seeded Wisconsin in the opening round of the tournament, holding the Badgers to 12 first half points, en route to a 43–32 victory. The 75 combined points between the Bears and Badgers resulted in the lowest scoring game in the history of the tournament since the shot clock was first implemented in college basketball. Furthermore, the 32 points scored by 18th ranked Wisconsin were at the time the fewest number of points ever scored by a ranked team in regulation during the shot clock era.

In the second round, senior Danny Moore delivered a 25–point performance to power the Bears to a shocking blowout of 4th seeded Tennessee to advance to the Sweet Sixteen for the first time in school history, where the Bears finally fell to the number 1 team in the nation and eventual National runner-up, Duke, 78–61.

To date, this is the deepest tournament run in school history. Following the season, Alford took the head coaching job at Iowa.

== Roster ==
The Southwest Missouri State Bears were represented on the court by a team composed of the following student athletes during the 1998-99 season:

1998–99 Missouri State Bears men's basketball team
Players
Coaches

Pos.	#	Name	Height	Weight	Year	Hometown
G	24	Kevin Ault	6 ft 2 in (1.88 m)	—	Jr	Warsaw, Indiana
G	10	Ryan Bettenhausen	6 ft 1 in (1.85 m)	—	Sr	Tinley Park, Illinois
F	20	Scott Brakebill	6 ft 8 in (2.03 m)	—	Fr	Bolivar, Missouri
F	23	Ron Bruton	6 ft 6 in (1.98 m)	—	Jr	Greer, South Carolina
G	12	William Fontleroy	6 ft 1 in (1.85 m)	—	Jr	Gary, Indiana
G	21	Eric Judd	6 ft 1 in (1.85 m)	—	Jr	West Plains, Missouri
G	4	Brandon Miller	6 ft 0 in (1.83 m)	—	Fr	New Castle, Indiana
C	32	Danny Moore	6 ft 11 in (2.11 m)	—	Sr	Shelbyville, Indiana
F	3	Paul Murrans	6 ft 6 in (1.98 m)	—	Jr	Terre Haute, Indiana
G	33	Allen Phillips	6 ft 5 in (1.96 m)	—	Jr	Little Rock, Arkansas
C	50	Matt Rueter	6 ft 8 in (2.03 m)	—	So	Fulton, Missouri
F	5	Ken Stringer	6 ft 4 in (1.93 m)	—	Sr	Stonecrest, Georgia
F	25	Butch Tshomba	6 ft 6 in (1.98 m)	—	Sr	Schaerbeek, Belgium

Head coach

- Steve Alford (Iowa)

Assistant coach(es)

- Brian Jones (Northern Iowa)

Legend

- (C) Team captain
- (S) Suspended
- (I) Ineligible
- (W) Walk-on
- Injured
- Current redshirt

Roster

== Schedule and results ==
Date time, TV	Rank^{#}	Opponent^{#}	Result	Record	Site city, state
Regular Season
Nov 14, 1998*; 6:00 pm		at Butler	W 72–57	1–0	Hinkle Fieldhouse (8,002); Indianapolis, IN
Nov 18, 1998*; 7:05 pm		at Missouri; Preseason NIT	W 72–69	2–0	Hearnes Center (5,176); Columbia, MO
Nov 20, 1998*; 6:30 pm		at No. 3 Stanford; Preseason NIT	L 51–76	2–1	Maples Pavilion (7,391); Stanford, CA
Nov 23, 1998*; 7:05 pm		Missouri-Kansas City	W 74–68	3–1	Hammons Student Center (8,074); Springfield, MO
Dec 4, 1998*; 8:35 pm		Texas Southern	W 77–47	4–1	Hammons Student Center (7,148); Springfield, MO
Dec 5, 1998*; 8:35 pm		Louisiana Tech	W 86–60	5–1	Hammons Student Center (7,016); Springfield, MO
Dec 9, 1998*; 7:05 pm		Long Beach State	W 80–52	6–1	Hammons Student Center (6,903); Springfield, MO
Dec 12, 1998; 7:05 pm		at Southern Illinois	W 76–62	7–1 (1–0)	SIU Arena (3,112); Carbondale, IL
Dec 19, 1998*; 7:05 pm		TCU	L 69–71	7–2	Hammons Student Center (9,114); Springfield, MO
Dec 22, 1998*; 7:05 pm		Southeast Missouri State	W 67–56	8–2	Hammons Student Center (6,584); Springfield, MO
Dec 30, 1998; 7:05 pm		at Northern Iowa	W 81–66	9–2 (2–0)	UNI-Dome (2,092); Cedar Falls, IA
Jan 2, 1999*; 1:05 pm		at St. Louis	W 79–67	10–2	Kiel Center (14,195); St. Louis, MO
Jan 5, 1999; 7:05 pm		Illinois State	W 71–68	11–2 (3–0)	Hammons Student Center (6,865); Springfield, MO
Jan 10, 1999; 2:05 pm		Creighton	L 70–72	11–3 (3–1)	Hammons Student Center (7,893); Springfield, MO
Jan 13, 1999; 7:05 pm		Bradley	W 83–78	12–3 (4–1)	Hammons Student Center (7,498); Springfield, MO
Jan 16, 1999; 1:35 pm		Drake	W 91–47	13–3 (5–1)	Hammons Student Center (7,835); Springfield, MO
Jan 18, 1999; 7:35 pm		at Wichita State	L 88–94 ^{2OT}	13–4 (5–2)	Levitt Arena (7,426); Wichita, KS
Jan 21, 1999; 7:05 pm		Northern Iowa	W 83–75	14–4 (6–2)	Hammons Student Center (7,609); Springfield, MO
Jan 23, 1999; 2:05 pm		at Indiana State	L 61–71	14–5 (6–3)	Hulman Center (5,964); Terre Haute, IN
Jan 27, 1999; 7:05 pm		at Drake	W 90–85	15–5 (7–3)	Knapp Center (3,242); Des Moines, IA
Jan 31, 1999; 2:05 pm		Wichita State	W 89–58	16–5 (8–3)	Hammons Student Center (7,356); Springfield, MO
Feb 3, 1999; 7:05 pm		at Illinois State	L 54–62	16–6 (8–4)	Redbird Arena (7,310); Normal, IL
Feb 6, 1999; 7:05 pm		Evansville	L 62–65	16–7 (8–5)	Hammons Student Center (8,762); Springfield, MO
Feb 10, 1999; 7:05 pm		Southern Illinois	W 72–68 ^{OT}	17–7 (9–5)	Hammons Student Center (7,078); Springfield, MO
Feb 13, 1999; 8:05 pm		at Bradley	W 61–48	18–7 (10–5)	Peoria Civic Center (10,847); Peoria, IL
Feb 17, 1999; 7:05 pm		at Creighton	L 76–79	18–8 (10–6)	Omaha Civic Auditorium (5,337); Omaha, NE
Feb 20, 1999; 7:05 pm		Indiana State	W 80–67	19–8 (11–6)	Hammons Student Center (8,953); Springfield, MO
Feb 22, 1999; 7:35 pm		at Evansville	L 65–68 ^{OT}	19–9 (11–7)	Roberts Stadium (10,421); Evansville, IN
MVC Tournament
Feb 27, 1999*; 8:30 pm, FSN	(3)	vs. (6) Indiana State; Quarterfinal	W 79–78 ^{OT}	20–9	Kiel Center (11,129); St. Louis, MO
Feb 28, 1999*; 4:00 pm, FSN	(3)	vs. (2) Creighton; Semifinal	L 70–78	20–10	Kiel Center (11,393); St. Louis, MO
NCAA Tournament
Mar 12, 1999*; 2:57 pm, CBS	(12 E)	vs. (5 E) No. 18 Wisconsin; First Round	W 43–32	21–10	Charlotte Coliseum (15,007); Charlotte, NC
Mar 14, 1999*; 2:30 pm, CBS	(12 E)	vs. (4 E) No. 20 Tennessee; Second Round	W 81–51	22–10	Charlotte Coliseum (20,172); Charlotte, NC
Mar 19, 1999*; 6:38 pm, CBS	(12 E)	vs. (1 E) No. 1 Duke; Sweet Sixteen	L 61–78	22–11	Continental Airlines Arena (19,233); East Rutherford, NJ
*Non-conference game. ^{#}Rankings from AP poll. (#) Tournament seedings in parentheses. E=East. All times are in Central Time.
