= 2000 Missouri Valley Conference men's basketball tournament =

- Classification: Division I
- Season: 1999–00
- Teams: 10
- Site: Kiel Center; St. Louis, Missouri
- Champions: Creighton (6th title)
- Winning coach: Dana Altman (2nd title)
- MVP: Ryan Sears (Creighton)

1999–2000 Missouri Valley Conference men's basketball standings
	Conf.				Overall
Team	W		L	PCT	W		L	PCT
Indiana State	14	–	4	.778	22	–	10	.688
Southwest Missouri State	13	–	5	.722	23	–	11	.676
Southern Illinois	12	–	6	.667	20	–	13	.606
Creighton †	11	–	7	.611	23	–	10	.697
Bradley	10	–	8	.556	14	–	16	.467
Evansville	9	–	9	.500	18	–	12	.600
Northern Iowa	7	–	11	.389	14	–	15	.483
Illinois State	5	–	13	.278	10	–	20	.333
Wichita State	5	–	13	.278	12	–	17	.414
Drake	4	–	14	.222	11	–	18	.379
† 2000 MVC tournament winner Rankings from AP Poll

The 2000 Missouri Valley Conference men's basketball tournament was played after the conclusion of the 1999–2000 regular season at the Kiel Center in St. Louis, Missouri.

The Creighton Bluejays defeated the Southwest Missouri State Bears in the championship game, 57–45, and as a result won their 6th MVC Tournament title and earned an automatic bid to the 2000 NCAA tournament. Ryan Sears of Creighton was named the tournament MVP.

== Tournament Bracket ==
Opening Round; March 3, 2000
8	Illinois State	55
9	Wichita State	70
7	Northern Iowa	57
10	Drake	58

Quarterfinals; March 4, 2000
1	Indiana State	57
9	Wichita State	50
4	Creighton	71
5	Bradley	62
2	Southwest Missouri State	62
10	Drake	50
3	Southern Illinois	75
6	Evansville	63

Semifinals; March 5, 2000
1	Indiana State	69
4	Creighton	71
2	Southwest Missouri State	67
3	Southern Illinois	56

Final; March 6, 2000
4	Creighton	57
2	Southwest Missouri State	45

== See also ==
- Missouri Valley Conference
