= 1998–99 Creighton Bluejays men's basketball team =

American college basketball season

1998–99 Creighton Bluejays men's basketball
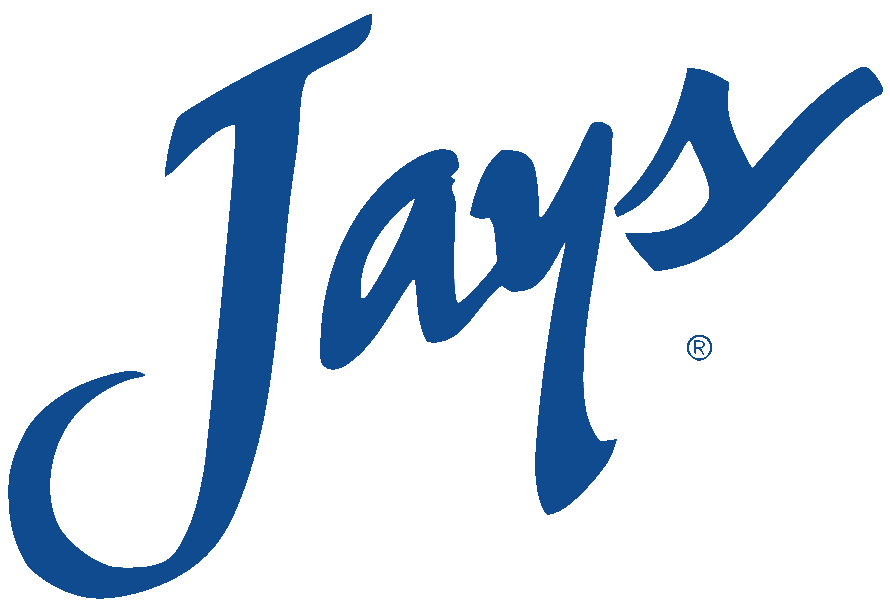

MVC tournament champion

NCAA tournament, second round
- Conference: Missouri Valley Conference
- Record: 22–9 (11–7 MVC)
- Head coach: Dana Altman (5th year)
- Assistant coaches: Greg Grensing (5th year); Len Gordy (5th year); Darian DeVries (1st year)
- Home arena: Omaha Civic Auditorium

1998–99 Missouri Valley Conference men's basketball standings
	Conf.				Overall
Team	W		L	PCT	W		L	PCT
Evansville	13	–	5	.722	23	–	10	.697
Creighton †	11	–	7	.611	22	–	9	.710
Southwest Missouri State	11	–	7	.611	22	–	11	.667
Bradley	11	–	7	.611	17	–	12	.586
Southern Illinois	10	–	8	.556	15	–	12	.556
Indiana State	10	–	8	.556	15	–	12	.556
Illinois State	7	–	11	.389	16	–	15	.516
Wichita State	6	–	12	.333	13	–	17	.433
Northern Iowa	6	–	12	.333	9	–	18	.333
Drake	5	–	13	.278	10	–	17	.370
† 1999 MVC tournament winner Rankings from AP Poll

The 1998–99 Creighton Bluejays men's basketball team represented Creighton University during the 1998–99 NCAA Division I men's basketball season. The Bluejays, led by head coach Dana Altman, played their home games at the Omaha Civic Auditorium. The Jays finished with a 22–9 record, and won the Missouri Valley Conference tournament to earn an automatic bid to the 1999 NCAA tournament.

== Roster ==
1998–99 Creighton Bluejays men's basketball team
Players
Coaches

Pos.	#	Name	Height	Weight	Year	Previous school	Hometown
G	3	Matt West	6 ft 4 in (1.93 m)	190 lb (86 kg)	Jr	Westside HS	Omaha, NE
G	4	Ben Walker	6 ft 2 in (1.88 m)	205 lb (93 kg)	So		Oak Creek, WI
G	5	Ryan Sears	6 ft 0 in (1.83 m)	185 lb (84 kg)	So	Ankeny HS	Ankeny, IA
F	55	Nerijus Karlikanovas	6 ft 8 in (2.03 m)	220 lb (100 kg)	Jr		Raseiniai, Lithuania

Head coach

- Dana Altman (Eastern New Mexico)

Assistant coach(es)

- Greg Grensing
- Len Gordy
- Darian DeVries (Northern Iowa)

Legend

- (C) Team captain
- (S) Suspended
- (I) Ineligible
- (W) Walk-on
- Injured
- Current redshirt

== Schedule ==
Date time, TV	Rank^{#}	Opponent^{#}	Result	Record	Site (attendance) city, state
Regular season
Nov 25, 1998*		at Iowa	W 75–73	2–0	Carver–Hawkeye Arena; Iowa City, IA
Dec 9, 1998*		at Nebraska; Rivalry	L 60–76	6–1	Bob Devaney Sports Center; Lincoln, NE
Feb 22, 1999		Wichita State	W 76–65	18–8 (11–7)	Omaha Civic Auditorium; Omaha, NE
Missouri Valley Conference tournament
Feb 27, 1999*		vs. Illinois State; MVC Tournament Quarterfinal	W 68–63	19–8	Scottrade Center; St. Louis, MO
Feb 28, 1999*		vs. Missouri State; MVC Tournament Semifinal	W 78–70	20–8	Scottrade Center; St. Louis, MO
Mar 1, 1999*		vs. Evansville; MVC tournament championship	W 70–61	21–8	Scottrade Center; St. Louis, MO
1999 NCAA tournament
Mar 11, 1999*	(10 S)	vs. (7 S) Louisville; First round	W 62–58	22–8	Orlando Arena; Orlando, FL
Mar 13, 1999*	(10 S)	vs. (2 S) No. 5 Maryland; Second round	L 63–75	22–9	Orlando Arena; Orlando, FL
*Non-conference game. ^{#}Rankings from AP. (#) Tournament seedings in parentheses. S=South. All times are in Central.
