= 1999–2000 Indiana State Sycamores men's basketball team =

American college basketball season

1999–2000 Indiana State Sycamores men's basketball

MVC Champions

NCAA tournament, first round, L 61–77 vs. Texas
- Conference: Missouri Valley Conference
- Record: 22–10 (14–4 MVC)
- Head coach: Royce Waltman (3rd season)
- Home arena: Hulman Center

1999–2000 Missouri Valley Conference men's basketball standings
	Conf.				Overall
Team	W		L	PCT	W		L	PCT
Indiana State	14	–	4	.778	22	–	10	.688
Southwest Missouri State	13	–	5	.722	23	–	11	.676
Southern Illinois	12	–	6	.667	20	–	13	.606
Creighton †	11	–	7	.611	23	–	10	.697
Bradley	10	–	8	.556	14	–	16	.467
Evansville	9	–	9	.500	18	–	12	.600
Northern Iowa	7	–	11	.389	14	–	15	.483
Illinois State	5	–	13	.278	10	–	20	.333
Wichita State	5	–	13	.278	12	–	17	.414
Drake	4	–	14	.222	11	–	18	.379
† 2000 MVC tournament winner Rankings from AP Poll

1999–2000 Indiana State Sycamores men's basketball team represented Indiana State University during the 1999–2000 men's college basketball season. They earned an at-large bid to the NCAA Tournament where they lost in the first round to Texas.

Royce Waltman was MVC coach of the year award and Nate Green was the conference player of the year award.

== Roster ==
1999–2000 Indiana State Sycamores men's basketball team
Players
Coaches

Pos.	#	Name	Height	Weight	Year	Hometown
F	3	Djibril Kante	6 ft 8 in (2.03 m)	—	So	Bloomington, Indiana
F	4	Nate Green	6 ft 5 in (1.96 m)	195 lb (88 kg)	Sr	Des Moines, Iowa
G	5	Michael Menser	5 ft 11 in (1.8 m)	—	Jr
F	32	Matt Renn	6 ft 6 in (1.98 m)	—	Jr

Head coach

- Royce Waltman

Assistant coach(es)

Legend

- (C) Team captain
- (S) Suspended
- (I) Ineligible
- (W) Walk-on
- Injured
- Current redshirt

== Schedule ==
Date time, TV	Rank^{#}	Opponent^{#}	Result	Record	Site city, state
November 19*		vs. George Washington	L 74–80	0–1	Carlson Center; Fairbanks, Alaska
November 20*		vs. Montana State	W 81–64	1–1	Carlson Center; Fairbanks, Alaska
November 21*		vs. TCU	W 89–77	2–1	Carlson Center; Fairbanks, Alaska
November 27*		at Ball State	L 55–64	2–2	Worthen Arena; Muncie, Indiana
December 1*		at Butler	L 55–77	2–3	Hinkle Fieldhouse; Indianapolis, Indiana
December 4*		at Austin Peay	L 68–82	2–4	Dunn Center; Clarksville, Tennessee
December 7*		Western Illinois	W 53–51	3–4	Hulman Center; Terre Haute, Indiana
December 10*		vs. North Texas	W 77–63	4–4	Assembly Hall; Bloomington, Indiana
December 11*		at Indiana	W 63–60	5–4	Assembly Hall; Bloomington, Indiana
December 19*		Eastern Illinois	W 102–91 ^{2OT}	6–4	Hulman Center; Terre Haute, Indiana
December 22*		Tennessee State	W 89–62	7–4	Hulman Center; Terre Haute, Indiana
December 30		Wichita State	W 58–53	8–4 (1–0)	Hulman Center; Terre Haute, Indiana
January 6		Creighton	W 56–46	9–4 (2–0)	Hulman Center; Terre Haute, Indiana
January 8		at Bradley	L 51–62	9–5 (2–1)	Carver Arena; Peoria, Illinois
January 12		at Illinois State	W 56–54	10–5 (3–1)	Redbird Arena; Normal, Illinois
January 15		Missouri State	W 62–60	11–5 (4–1)	Hulman Center; Terre Haute, Indiana
January 19		Southern Illinois	W 91–56	12–5 (5–1)	Hulman Center; Terre Haute, Indiana
January 22		Drake	W 73–56	13–5 (6–1)	Hulman Center; Terre Haute, Indiana
January 27		at Wichita State	W 72–65	14–5 (7–1)	Levitt Arena; Wichita, Kansas
January 29		at Drake	W 73–56	15–5 (8–1)	Knapp Center; Des Moines, Iowa
February 2		Illinois State	W 77–57	16–5 (9–1)	Hulman Center; Terre Haute, Indiana
February 6		at Missouri State	L 48–64	16–6 (9–2)	Hammons Student Center; Springfield, Missouri
February 9		at Northern Iowa	W 67–61	17–6 (10–2)	UNI-Dome; Cedar Falls, Iowa
February 12		Evansville	W 69–60	18–6 (11–2)	Hulman Center; Terre Haute, Indiana
February 16		at Creighton	L 58–64	18–7 (11–3)	Omaha Civic Auditorium; Omaha, Nebraska
February 19		Northern Iowa	W 66–55	19–7 (12–3)	Hulman Center; Terre Haute, Indiana
February 23		at Southern Illinois	L 61–80	19–8 (12–4)	The SIU Arena; Carbondale, Illinois
February 26		at Evansville	W 55–52	20–8 (13–4)	Roberts Stadium; Evansville, Indiana
February 28		Bradley	W 56–54	21–8 (14–4)	Hulman Center; Terre Haute, Indiana
Missouri Valley tournament
March 4		vs. Wichita State	W 57–50	22–8 (14–4)	Kiel Center; St. Louis, Missouri
March 5		vs. Creighton	L 69–71	22–9 (14–4)	Kiel Center; St. Louis, Missouri
2000 NCAA tournament
March 16		vs. Texas; First Round	L 61–77	22–10 (14–4)	Jon M. Huntsman Center; Salt Lake City, Utah
*Non-conference game. ^{#}Rankings from AP Poll. (#) Tournament seedings in parentheses.
