= 1999 Missouri Valley Conference men's basketball tournament =

Basketball Tournament

- Classification: Division I
- Season: 1998–99
- Teams: 10
- Site: Kiel Center; St. Louis, Missouri
- Champions: Creighton (5th title)
- Winning coach: Dana Altman (1st title)
- MVP: Rodney Buford (Creighton)

1998–99 Missouri Valley Conference men's basketball standings
	Conf.				Overall
Team	W		L	PCT	W		L	PCT
Evansville	13	–	5	.722	23	–	10	.697
Creighton †	11	–	7	.611	22	–	9	.710
Southwest Missouri State	11	–	7	.611	22	–	11	.667
Bradley	11	–	7	.611	17	–	12	.586
Southern Illinois	10	–	8	.556	15	–	12	.556
Indiana State	10	–	8	.556	15	–	12	.556
Illinois State	7	–	11	.389	16	–	15	.516
Wichita State	6	–	12	.333	13	–	17	.433
Northern Iowa	6	–	12	.333	9	–	18	.333
Drake	5	–	13	.278	10	–	17	.370
† 1999 MVC tournament winner Rankings from AP Poll

The 1999 Missouri Valley Conference men's basketball tournament was played after the conclusion of the 1998–1999 regular season at the Kiel Center in St. Louis, Missouri.

The Creighton defeated the Evansville in the championship game, 70–61, and as a result won their 5th MVC Tournament title and earned an automatic bid to the 1999 NCAA tournament. Rodney Buford of Creighton was named the tournament MVP.

== Tournament Bracket ==
Opening Round; February 26, 1999
8	Wichita State	74
9	Northern Iowa	72
7	Illinois State	51
10	Drake	47

Quarterfinals; February 27, 1999
1	Evansville	79
8	Wichita State	71
4	Bradley	62
5	Southern Illinois	59
2	Creighton	68
7	Illinois State	63
3	Southwest Missouri State	79
6	Indiana State	78

Semifinals; February 28, 1999
1	Evansville	64
4	Bradley	63
2	Creighton	78
3	Southwest Missouri State	70

Final; March 1, 1999
1	Evansville	61
2	Creighton	70

== See also ==
- Missouri Valley Conference
