= Pooh Williamson =

American basketball player and coach

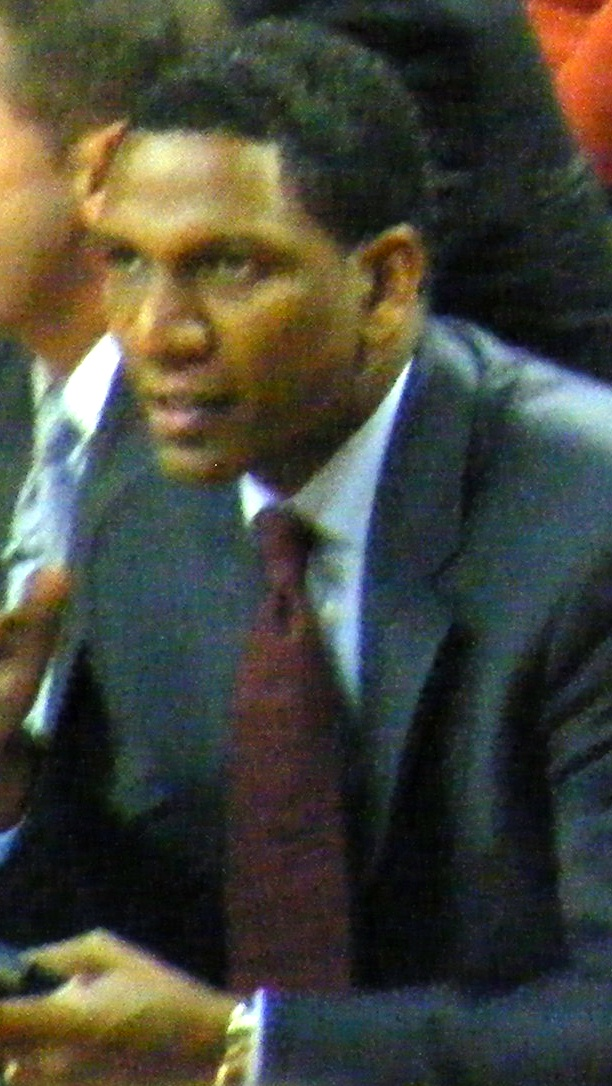
- Williamson in February 2008

Current position
- Title: ESPN Basketball Announcer

Biographical details
- Born: September 5, 1973 (age 53); Okmulgee, Oklahoma

Playing career
- 1991–1995: Tulsa
- Position: Point guard

Coaching career (HC unless noted)
- 1996–1998: Washington State (asst.)
- 1998–2000: Illinois State (asst.)
- 2000–2001: Tulane (asst.)
- 2001–2004: Tulsa (asst.)
- 2004–2005: Tulsa (Interim HC)
- 2005–2007: Wichita State (asst.)
- 2007–2011: Texas A&M (asst.)
- 2011–2012: SMU (asst.)
- 2012–2013: TCU (asst.)
- 2013–2016: Texas Tech (asst.)
- 2016–2018: Memphis (asst.)
- 2018–2019: Miami (asst.)
- 2019–2021: Oklahoma (asst.)

Head coaching record
- Overall: 7–15

Alvin "Pooh" Williamson (born September 5, 1973) is a former college basketball player who was most recently an assistant coach at the University of Oklahoma. Williamson was interim head coach at the University of Tulsa and was an assistant coach at Texas Tech University.

Williamson played for the Golden Hurricane from 1991 to 1995, becoming one of their best guards. In 2001, he returned to become an assistant coach before becoming Tulsa's head coach following John Phillips' resignation in December 2004. Williamson finished the 2004–2005 season as Tulsa's head coach before being replaced by Doug Wojcik.

Williamson coached at Miami as an assistant during the 2018–19 season. In June 2019, he was hired to Lon Kruger's staff at Oklahoma.

== Head coaching record ==
Record table
Season	Team	Overall	Conference	Standing	Postseason
Tulsa Golden Hurricane (Western Athletic Conference) (2004–2005)
2004–05	Tulsa	7–15	5–13	9th	
Tulsa:		7–15 (.318)	5–13 (.278)		
Total:		7–15 (.318)			
National champion Postseason invitational champion Conference regular season champion Conference regular season and conference tournament champion Division regular season champion Division regular season and conference tournament champion Conference tournament champion
