= 1996–97 Big East Conference men's basketball season =

American college basketball season

1996–97 Big East Conference Men's Basketball Season
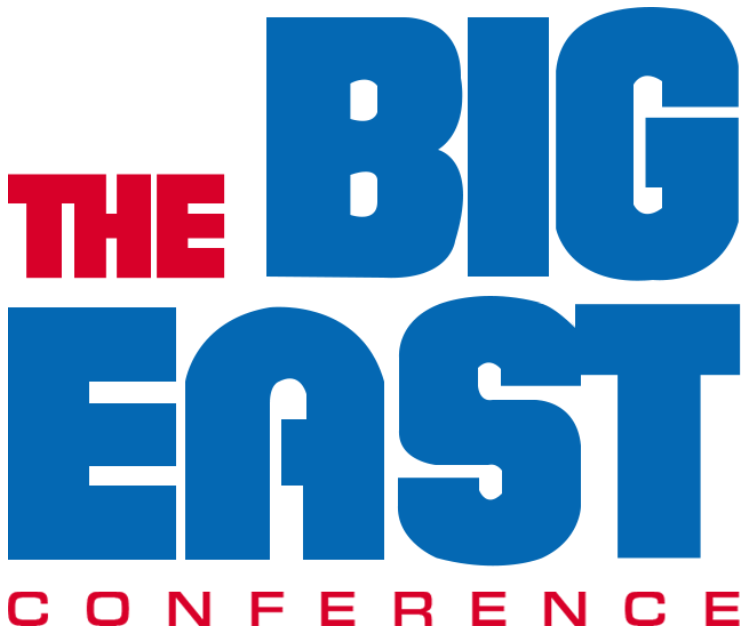
- League: NCAA Division I
- Sport: Basketball
- Duration: November 15, 1996 through March 8, 1997
- Teams: 13
- TV partner: ESPN

Regular Season
- Champion: Boston College and Villanova (Big East 6, 12–6); Georgetown (Big East 7, 11–7)
- Season MVP: Pat Garrity – Notre Dame

Tournament
- Champions: Boston College
- Finals MVP: Scoonie Penn – Boston College

Basketball seasons
- 1995–96 1997–98

1996–97 Big East men's basketball standings
	Conf.				Overall
Team	W		L	PCT	W		L	PCT
Big East 6
No. 20 Villanova	12	–	6	.667	24	–	10	.706
No. 23 Boston College†	12	–	6	.667	22	–	9	.710
West Virginia	11	–	7	.611	21	–	10	.677
Notre Dame	8	–	10	.444	16	–	14	.533
St. John's	8	–	10	.444	13	–	15	.464
Connecticut	7	–	11	.389	18	–	15	.545
Big East 7
Georgetown	11	–	7	.611	20	–	10	.667
Providence	10	–	8	.556	24	–	12	.667
Pittsburgh	10	–	8	.556	18	–	15	.545
Miami	9	–	9	.500	16	–	13	.552
Syracuse	9	–	9	.500	19	–	13	.594
Seton Hall	5	–	13	.278	10	–	18	.357
Rutgers	5	–	13	.278	11	–	16	.407
† 1997 Big East tournament winner As of March 31, 1997; Rankings from AP poll

The 1996–97 Big East Conference men's basketball season was the 18th in conference history, and involved its 13 full-time member schools.

Boston College and Villanova were the regular-season co-champions of the Big East 6 Division with identical records of 12–6, and Georgetown won the regular-season Big East 7 Division championship with a record of 11–5. Boston College won the Big East tournament championship.

== Season summary & highlights ==
- The Big East continued to use the divisional structure which had debuted the previous season, with six of its teams playing in the Big East 6 Division and seven in the Big East 7 Division. The divisional structure lasted through the 1997–98 season.
- The Big East played an 18-game regular-season conference schedule, making it impossible for each team to play each other conference member twice in a home-and-home series during the regular season, as Big East teams had from the 1980–81 season through the 1994–95 seasons. As they had the previous season. each team played six conference opponents twice in a home-and-home series and the other six once each. The schedule was unbalanced, with teams playing anywhere from one to four home-and-home series against teams in their own division and anywhere from two to five home-and-home series against teams in the other division. A notable anomaly that resulted was that Georgetown and St. John's each played Syracuse — in rivalries that had contributed to the rise of the Big East Conference to national prominence during the 1980s — only once for the first time since the conference's first season in 1979–80.
- Boston College and Villanova were the regular-season co-champions of the Big East 6 Division with identical records of 12–6. It was the third regular-season championship or co-championship as well as the first divisional title for both schools.
- Georgetown won the regular-season Big East 7 Division championship with a record of 11–5. It was the seventh regular-season championship or co-championship and second consecutive divisional title for Georgetown.
- Boston College won its first Big East tournament championship.
- The Big East introduced its Most Improved Player award, presented for the first time at the end of the season.

== Head coaches ==
School	Coach	Season	Notes
Boston College	Jim O'Brien	11th	Resigned April 2, 1997
Connecticut	Jim Calhoun	11th	
Georgetown	John Thompson, Jr.	25th	
Miami	Leonard Hamilton	7th	
Notre Dame	John MacLeod	6th	Big East Coach of the Year
Pittsburgh	Ralph Willard	3rd	
Providence	Pete Gillen	3rd	
Rutgers	Bob Wenzel	9th	Fired March 6, 1997
St. John's	Fran Fraschilla	1st	
Seton Hall	George Blaney	3rd	Fired March 10, 1997
Syracuse	Jim Boeheim	21st	
Villanova	Steve Lappas	5th	
West Virginia	Gale Catlett	19th	

== Rankings ==
Villanova was ranked in the Associated Press poll Top 25 all season, reaching No. 4. Boston College and Syracuse also spent time in the Top 25.

1996–97 Big East Conference Weekly Rankings Key: ██ Increase in ranking. ██ Decrease in ranking.
AP Poll	Pre	11/18	11/25	12/2	12/9	12/16	12/23	12/30	1/6	1/13	1/20	1/27	2/3	2/10	2/17	2/24	3/3	Final
Boston College	21	21	23	20	25		25	25	23	19	22							23
Connecticut																		
Georgetown																		
Miami																		
Notre Dame																		
Pittsburgh																		
Providence																		
Rutgers																		
St. John's																		
Seton Hall																		
Syracuse	12	13	12	19														
Villanova	7	6	5	5	4	10	10	10	8	16	12	14	16	18	19	18	21	20
West Virginia																		

== Regular-season statistical leaders ==
Scoring
Name	School	PPG
Victor Page	GU	22.7
Pat Garrity	ND	21.1
Austin Croshere	Prov	17.9
Derrick Brown	Prov	17.4
Shaheen Holloway	SHU	17.3

Rebounding
Name	School	RPG
Cheikh Yaya Dia	GU	10.1
Zendon Hamilton	SJU	9.4
Gordon Malone	WVU	8.6
Danya Abrams	BC	8.2
Charles Minlend	SJU	7.8

Assists
Name	School	APG
Admore White	ND	6.7
God Shammgod	Prov	6.6
Shaheen Holloway	SHU	6.3
Jason Hart	Syr	5.8
Ricky Moore	Conn	5.4

Steals
Name	School	SPG
Kellii Taylor	Pitt	3.2
Jason Hart	Syr	2.8
Shaheen Holloway	SHU	2.8
Vonteego Cummings	Pitt	2.6
Levell Sanders	SHU	2.5

Blocks
Name	School	BPG
Jason Lawson	Vill	3.1
Mark Blount	Pitt	2.7
Cheikh Yaya Dia	GU	2.3
Tim James	Mia	2.2
Jahidi White	GU	2.0

Field Goals
Name	School	FG%
Gordon Malone	WVU	.563
Adrian Pledger	WVU	.558
Otis Hill	Syr	.549
Derrick Brown	Prov	.499
Pat Garrity	ND	.484

3-Pt Field Goals
Name	School	3FG%
Jason Maile	Pitt	.392
Victor Page	GU	.373
Shaheen Holloway	SHU	.341
(no other qualifiers)

Free Throws
Name	School	FT%
Austin Croshere	Prov	.888
Rob Hodgson	RU	.847
Derrick Brown	Prov	.810
Tim Thomas	Vill	.796
Richard Hamilton	Conn	.784

== Postseason ==
=== Big East tournament ===
==== Seeding ====
The division winner with the best record received the No. 1 seed in the Big East tournament, the division winner with the second-best record received the No. 2 seed, and the second-place finisher with the best record received the No. 3 seed. The rest of the schools were seeded fourth through thirteenth based on conference record and tiebreakers. Teams seeded fourth through thirteenth played a first-round game, and the other three teams received a bye into the second round.

Villanova received the No. 1 seed based on it finishing as co-champion of the Big East 6 Division and winning the tiebreaker with Boston College. Georgetown received the No. 2 seed by winning the Big East 7 Division outright. Boston College received the No. 3 seed as the second-place finisher (after losing the tiebreaker with Villanova) with the best record. The tournament's seeding thus was as follows: (1) Villanova, (2) Georgetown, (3) Boston College, (4) Providence, (5) West Virginia, (6) Pittsburgh, (7) Miami, (8) Syracuse, (9) Notre Dame, (10) St. John's, (11) Connecticut, (12) Seton Hall, (13) Rutgers.

==== Bracket ====
First round
8	Syracuse	84
9	Notre Dame	66
4	Providence	77
13	Rutgers	56
5	West Virginia	77
12	Seton Hall	57
6	Pittsburgh	63
11	Connecticut	62
7	Miami	76^{OT}
10	St. John's	68

Second round
1	#21 Villanova	80
8	Syracuse	70
4	Providence	76
5	West Virginia	69
3	Boston College	76
6	Pittsburgh	68
2	Georgetown	63
7	Miami	59

Semifinals
1	#21 Villanova	73
4	Providence	63
3	Boston College	70
2	Georgetown	58

Championship Game
1	#21 Villanova	58
3	Boston College	70

=== NCAA tournament ===
Four Big East teams received bids to the NCAA Tournament. Georgetown lost in the first round and Villanova and Boston College in the second round. Providence was defeated in the Southeast Region final.

School	Region	Seed	Round 1	Round 2	Sweet 16	Elite 8
Providence	Southeast	10	7 Marquette, W 81–59	2 Duke, W 98–87	14 Chattanooga, W 71–65	4 Arizona, L 96–92^{(OT)}
Villanova	East	4	13 Long Island, W 101–91	5 California, L 75–68		
Boston College	West	5	12 Valparaiso, W 73–66	4 Saint Joseph's, L 81–77^{(OT)}		
Georgetown	East	10	7 Charlotte, L 79–67			

=== National Invitation Tournament ===
Five Big East teams received bids to the National Invitation Tournament, which did not yet have seeding. At least one played in each of the tournament's four unnamed brackets. Miami and Syracuse lost in the first round and Pittsburgh in the second round. Notre Dame was defeated in the quarterfinals, but Connecticut reached the semifinals.

As a result of the University of Michigan basketball scandal, all of Michigan's tournament wins later were vacated, including its victories over Miami and Notre Dame.

School	Round 1	Round 2	Quarterfinals	Semifinals
Connecticut	Iona, W 71–66	Bradley, W 63–47	Nebraska, W 76–67	Florida State, L 71–65
Notre Dame	Oral Roberts, W 74–58	TCU, W 82–72	~~Michigan~~, L 67–66	
Pittsburgh	New Orleans, W 82–63	Arkansas, L 86–73		
Miami	~~Michigan~~, L 76–63			
Syracuse	Florida State, L 82–67			

== Awards and honors ==
=== Big East Conference ===
Player of the Year:

- * Pat Garrity, Notre Dame, F, Jr.

Defensive Player of the Year:

- Jason Lawson, Villanova, C, Sr.

Rookie of the Year:

- Tim Thomas, Villanova, F, Fr.

Most Improved Player:

- Cheikh Yaya Dia, Georgetown, C, Sr.

Coach of the Year:

- John MacLeod, Notre Dame (6th season)

All-Big East First Team

- Danya Abrams, Boston College, F, Sr., 6 ft 7 in (201 cm), 251 lb (114 kg), Westchester, N.Y.
- Victor Page, Georgetown, G, So., 6 ft 3 in (191 cm), 200 lb (91 kg), Washington, D.C.
- Pat Garrity, Notre Dame, F, Jr., 6 ft 9 in (206 cm), 238 lb (108 kg), Las Vegas, Nev.
- Austin Croshere, Providence, C, Sr., 6 ft 10 in (208 cm), 235 lb (107 kg), Los Angeles, Calif.
- Alvin Williams, Villanova, G, Sr., 6 ft 5 in (196 cm), 180 lb (82 kg), Philadelphia, Pa.

All-Big East Second Team:

- Tim James, Miami, F, So., 6 ft 7 in (201 cm), 212 lb (96 kg), Miami, Fla.
- Vonteego Cummings, Pittsburgh, G, So., 6 ft 3 in (191 cm), 190 lb (86 kg), Thomson, Ga.
- Shaheen Holloway, Seton Hall, G, Fr., 5 ft 10 in (178 cm), 173 lb (78 kg), Queens, N.Y.
- Zendon Hamilton, St. John's, C, Jr., 6 ft 9 in (206 cm), 240 lb (109 kg), South Floral Park, N.Y.
- Otis Hill, Syracuse, C, Sr., 6 ft 8 in (203 cm), 290 lb (132 kg), White Plains, N.Y.
- Jason Lawson, Villanova, C, Sr., 6 ft 11 in (211 cm), 240 lb (109 kg), Philadelphia, Pa.

All-Big East Third Team:

- Derrick Brown, Providence, F, Sr., 6 ft 6 in (198 cm), 210 lb (95 kg), Brooklyn, N.Y.
- Felipe López, St. John's, G, Jr., 6 ft 5 in (196 cm), 199 lb (90 kg), Santo Domingo, Dominican Republic
- Jason Cipolla, Syracuse, G, Sr., 6 ft 7 in (201 cm), 200 lb (91 kg), Queens, N.Y.
- Tim Thomas, Villanova, F, Fr., 6 ft 10 in (208 cm), 240 lb (109 kg), Paterson, N.J.
- Damian Owens, West Virginia, F, Jr., 6 ft 6 in (198 cm), 215 lb (98 kg), Seat Pleasant, Md.

Big East All-Rookie Team:

- Richard Hamilton, Connecticut, G., Fr., 5 ft 11 in (180 cm), 180 lb (82 kg), Coatesville, Pa.
- Earl Johnson, Rutgers, G, Fr., 6 ft 7 in (201 cm), 212 lb (96 kg), Miami, Fla.
- Shaheen Holloway, Seton Hall, G, Fr., 5 ft 10 in (178 cm), 173 lb (78 kg), Queens, N.Y.
- Jason Hart, Syracuse, G, Fr., 6 ft 3 in (191 cm), 180 lb (82 kg), Los Angeles, Calif.
- Tim Thomas, Villanova, F, Fr., 6 ft 10 in (208 cm), 240 lb (109 kg), Paterson, N.J.

=== All-Americans ===
The following players were selected to the 1997 Associated Press All-America teams.

AP Honorable Mention

- Danya Abrams, Boston College
- Pat Garrity, Notre Dame
- Victor Page, Georgetown
- Tim Thomas, Villanova
- Alvin Williams, Villanova

== See also ==
- 1996–97 NCAA Division I men's basketball season
- 1996–97 Boston College Eagles men's basketball team
- 1996–97 Connecticut Huskies men's basketball team
- 1996–97 Georgetown Hoyas men's basketball team
- 1996–97 Pittsburgh Panthers men's basketball team
- 1996–97 Providence Friars men's basketball team
- 1996–97 St. John's Red Storm men's basketball team
- 1996–97 Villanova Wildcats men's basketball team
