= Aleksandar Radojević =

Bosnian basketball player (born 1976)

Personal information
- Born: August 8, 1976 (age 50)
- Listed height: 7 ft 3 in (2.21 m)
- Listed weight: 250 lb (113 kg)

Career information
- College: Barton County CC (1997–1999)
- NBA draft: 1999: 1st round, 12th overall pick
- Drafted by: Toronto Raptors
- Playing career: 1999–2012
- Position: Center
- Number: 25, 51

Career history
- 1995–1996: Lovćen
- 1996–1997: Budućnost Podgorica
- 1999–2000: Toronto Raptors
- 2001–2002: Union Olimpija
- 2002: Basket Livorno
- 2002–2003: Telekom Bonn
- 2003–2004: P.A.O.K.
- 2004–2005: Utah Jazz
- 2005: Asseco Prokom
- 2005–2006: Olympia Larissa
- 2006–2008: APOEL Nicosia
- 2008–2009: AEL Limassol
- 2009–2010: APOEL Nicosia
- 2010: Al Riyadi Beirut
- 2010–2011: Omonia
- 2011: Rilski Sportist
- 2012: APOEL Nicosia
- 2012: Lirija
- Stats at NBA.com
- Stats at Basketball Reference

Aleksandar Radojević (Serbian Cyrillic: Александар Радојевић, /rəˈdɔɪ.əvɪtʃ/; born August 8, 1976) is a Bosnian former professional basketball player. Standing at 2.21 m (7 ft 3 in), he played the center position. Radojević represented the Bosnia and Herzegovina national basketball team internationally.

== Early life ==
Radojević was born in either Herceg Novi, or Bijela, Montenegro, or Trebinje, in Bosnia and Herzegovina, all in the now former Socialist Federal Republic of Yugoslavia. He only started playing basketball at age 16 after playing football and water polo as a youngster.

== Career ==
Radojević started his career with Cetinje outfit KK Lovćen where he spent the 1995–96 season. For the next 1996–97 season he moved to Budućnost Podgorica where he sporadically played in a number of games.

A 7 ft 3 in center, Radojević signed a national letter of intent to play for Ohio State University's men's basketball in the early part of 1997. Radojevic never played for Ohio State because the NCAA declared him ineligible for accepting around $9,000 (or $13,000) to play for Budućnost in 1996. He thus ended up at Barton County Community College where he spent the next two seasons.

After a year at Barton County CC where he averaged over 4 blocks per game, accusations surfaced that Radojević had reportedly been given several thousand dollars to move to Ohio State University after his freshman season which resulted in coach Jim O'Brien getting fired and Radojevic being declared ineligible to play collegiately. O'Brien had given Radojević $6,700 ($6,000 of his own cash in $50 and $100 bills) in 1999, but had lied about it and tried to cover it up. O'Brien was fired June 8, 2004. O'Brien said he gave Radojević the loan in 1999 because the player's father was dying and the family had no money for medical treatment or the funeral.

O'Brien subsequently sued Ohio State for wrongful termination. He contended that he knew Radojevic could never suit up for Ohio State due to having played professionally, and that the loan was made for humanitarian reasons—a contention supported by Ohio State athletic director Andy Geiger and lead investigator Steve Duffin. NCAA infractions committee chairman David Swank testified that O'Brien had not violated NCAA rules by making the loan. O'Brien was ultimately awarded $2.4 million in damages.

=== NBA ===
Radojević then entered his name in the 1999 NBA draft and was selected by the Toronto Raptors in the first round. His first season in the NBA in 1999–2000 was not a happy one—after appearing in only three games recording 2.3 ppg and 2.7 rpg he got injured and missed the remainder of the campaign. In the summer of 2000, he played in the Rocky Mountain Revue summer league. Back with the Raptors for the 2000–01 season he fared even worse than in his rookie season, as the combination of bad form and nagging injuries kept him out of the lineup completely. He did not record a single minute of action in the season before the Raptors decided to trade him to the Denver Nuggets on January 12, 2001, along with Kevin Willis, Garth Joseph, and a second-round draft choice, in exchange for Keon Clark, Tracy Murray, and Mamadou N'diaye.

However, things did not improve much for Radojević in Denver either as he sat out the remainder of the 2000–01 season without appearing in any games for the Nuggets. On October 22, 2001, before the start of the 2001–02 season, Denver shipped him off to the Milwaukee Bucks along with Kevin Willis as part of a three-way trade that saw Scott Williams join the Nuggets.

Radojević's time with Milwaukee was more of the same and two months into the season he was waived without recording any minutes played.

=== Back to Europe ===
In December 2001, Radojević signed with Slovenian team Olimpija Ljubljana that competed in the Euroleague and the Adriatic League. He appeared in seven Euroleague games for them (3.3 ppg, 2.7 rpg) as well as in nine Adriatic League games (4.8 ppg, 2.9 rpg) before he was on his way out barely 3 months after arriving.

Radojević's next stop was with Basket Livorno of the Italian League where he spent the remainder of the 2001–02 season (9 games, 3.2 ppg, 2.0 rpg).

For the 2002–03 campaign, Radojević signed with Telekom Baskets Bonn of the German Bundesliga. His stats finally somewhat improved as he featured in 26 domestic league games (8.5 ppg, 7.7 rpg) and ten ULEB Cup matches (6.2 ppg, 8.0 rpg).

Over the summer of 2003, Radojević moved to PAOK Thessaloniki of the Greek League where he spent the entire 2003–04 season.

=== Brief return to the NBA ===
Radojević played twelve games for the Utah Jazz in the 2004–05 season.

=== Third stint in Europe ===
Radojević later played professionally in Poland for Prokom Trefl Sopot, in Greece for Olympia Larissa (2005–06 season), and in Cyprus (APOEL Nicosia, Keravnos Keo Nicosia).

== National team career ==
Radojević represented Bosnia and Herzegovina at the 2005 EuroBasket.

== See also ==
- List of tallest players in National Basketball Association history
- List of European basketball players in the United States
