= 1996–97 Boston College Eagles men's basketball team =

American college basketball season

1996–97 Boston College Eagles men's basketball

Big East regular season co-champion Big East tournament champion

NCAA tournament, Second round
- Conference: Big East Conference

Ranking
- Coaches: No. 23
- AP: No. 23
- Record: 22–9 (12–6 Big East)
- Head coach: Jim O'Brien (11th season)
- Home arena: Silvio O. Conte Forum

1996–97 Big East men's basketball standings
	Conf.				Overall
Team	W		L	PCT	W		L	PCT
Big East 6
No. 20 Villanova	12	–	6	.667	24	–	10	.706
No. 23 Boston College†	12	–	6	.667	22	–	9	.710
West Virginia	11	–	7	.611	21	–	10	.677
Notre Dame	8	–	10	.444	16	–	14	.533
St. John's	8	–	10	.444	13	–	15	.464
Connecticut	7	–	11	.389	18	–	15	.545
Big East 7
Georgetown	11	–	7	.611	20	–	10	.667
Providence	10	–	8	.556	24	–	12	.667
Pittsburgh	10	–	8	.556	18	–	15	.545
Miami	9	–	9	.500	16	–	13	.552
Syracuse	9	–	9	.500	19	–	13	.594
Seton Hall	5	–	13	.278	10	–	18	.357
Rutgers	5	–	13	.278	11	–	16	.407
† 1997 Big East tournament winner As of March 31, 1997; Rankings from AP poll

The 1996–97 Boston College Eagles men's basketball team represented Boston College as members of the Big East Conference during the 1996–97 NCAA Division I men's basketball season. The team was led by 11th-year head coach Jim O'Brien and played their home games at the Silvio O. Conte Forum in Boston, Massachusetts.

After finishing tied atop the Big East regular season standings, the Eagles won the Big East tournament to receive an automatic bid to the NCAA tournament as No. 5 seed in the West region. After defeating a game Valparaiso team in the opening round, the Eagles were eliminated in overtime by Saint Joseph's, 81–77, in the round of 32.

== Roster ==
1996–97 Boston College Eagles men's basketball team
Players
Coaches

Pos.	#	Name	Height	Weight	Year	Hometown
G	11	Scoonie Penn	5 ft 11 in (1.8 m)	180 lb (82 kg)	So	Salem, Massachusetts
C	14	Mickey Curley	6 ft 9 in (2.06 m)	—	Jr	Duxbury, Massachusetts
G	20	Duane Woodward	6 ft 3 in (1.91 m)	200 lb (91 kg)	Jr	New York, New York
F	24	Danya Abrams	6 ft 7 in (2.01 m)	240 lb (109 kg)	Sr	Westchester, New York

Head coach

- Jim O'Brien (Boston College)

Assistant coach(es)

Legend

- (C) Team captain
- (S) Suspended
- (I) Ineligible
- (W) Walk-on
- Injured
- Current redshirt

Roster

== Schedule and results ==
Date time, TV	Rank^{#}	Opponent^{#}	Result	Record	Site (attendance) city, state
Regular season
Nov 22, 1996*	No. 21	Brown	W 89–72	1–0	Silvio O. Conte Forum; Boston, Massachusetts
Nov 25, 1996*	No. 23	New Hampshire	W 82–40	2–0	Silvio O. Conte Forum; Boston, Massachusetts
Dec 4, 1996	No. 20	Rutgers	W 73–64	3–0 (1–0)	Silvio O. Conte Forum; Boston, Massachusetts
Dec 7, 1996	No. 20	at Connecticut	L 54–61	3–1 (1–1)	Harry A. Gampel Pavilion; Storrs, Connecticut
Dec 9, 1996*	No. 25	Vanderbilt	W 59–52	4–1	Silvio O. Conte Forum; Boston, Massachusetts
Dec 21, 1996*		at Holy Cross	W 92–76	5–1	Hart Center; Worcester, Massachusetts
Dec 27, 1996*	No. 25	Central Connecticut State	W 63–53	6–1	Silvio O. Conte Forum; Boston, Massachusetts
Dec 29, 1996*	No. 25	at No. 16 Louisville	L 85–89 ^{2OT}	6–2	Freedom Hall; Louisville, Kentucky
Jan 2, 1997	No. 25	Miami (FL)	W 65–62	7–2 (2–1)	Silvio O. Conte Forum; Boston, Massachusetts
Jan 4, 1997	No. 25	at Seton Hall	W 80–64	8–2 (3–1)	Continental Airlines Arena; East Rutherford, New Jersey
Jan 7, 1997	No. 23	at Syracuse	W 94–83	9–2 (4–1)	Carrier Dome; Syracuse, New York
Jan 11, 1997	No. 23	at Notre Dame	W 73–61	10–2 (5–1)	Joyce Center; Notre Dame, Indiana
Jan 13, 1997	No. 19	Georgetown	W 81–74	11–2 (6–1)	Silvio O. Conte Forum; Boston, Massachusetts
Jan 15, 1997*	No. 19	at Fairfield	W 81–79 ^{OT}	12–2	Alumni Hall; Fairfield, Connecticut
Jan 18, 1997*	No. 19	vs. UMass	L 78–90	12–3	TD Garden; Boston, Massachusetts
Jan 21, 1997	No. 22	Pittsburgh	W 81–61	13–3 (7–1)	Silvio O. Conte Forum; Boston, Massachusetts
Jan 25, 1997	No. 22	No. 12 Villanova	L 66–84	13–4 (7–2)	Silvio O. Conte Forum; Boston, Massachusetts
Jan 29, 1997		at West Virginia	L 76–89	13–5 (7–3)	WVU Coliseum; Morgantown, West Virginia
Feb 1, 1997		at Providence	L 71–83	13–6 (7–4)	Providence Civic Center; Providence, Rhode Island
Feb 4, 1997		Syracuse	W 79–71	14–6 (8–4)	Silvio O. Conte Forum; Boston, Massachusetts
Feb 9, 1997		St. John's	W 81–80 ^{OT}	15–6 (9–4)	Silvio O. Conte Forum; Boston, Massachusetts
Feb 12, 1997		Connecticut	L 56–61	15–7 (9–5)	Silvio O. Conte Forum; Boston, Massachusetts
Feb 16, 1997		Seton Hall	W 74–57	16–7 (10–5)	Silvio O. Conte Forum; Boston, Massachusetts
Feb 19, 1997		at Miami (FL)	W 59–57	17–7 (11–5)	Miami Arena; Miami, Florida
Feb 23, 1997		at Pittsburgh	L 71–75	17–8 (11–6)	Fitzgerald Field House; Pittsburgh, Pennsylvania
Mar 1, 1997		Notre Dame	W 76–74	18–8 (12–6)	Silvio O. Conte Forum; Boston, Massachusetts
Big East tournament
Mar 6, 1997*	(3)	vs. (6) Pittsburgh; Quarterfinals	W 76–68	19–8	Madison Square Garden; New York, New York
Mar 7, 1997*	(3)	vs. (2) Georgetown; Semifinals	W 70–58	20–8	Madison Square Garden; New York, New York
Mar 8, 1997*	(3)	vs. (1) No. 21 Villanova; Championship game	W 70–58	21–8	Madison Square Garden; New York, New York
NCAA Tournament
Mar 13, 1997*	(5 W) No. 23	vs. (12 W) Valparaiso; First round	W 73–66	22–8	Jon M. Huntsman Center; Salt Lake City, Utah
Mar 15, 1997*	(5 W) No. 23	vs. (4 W) No. 12 Saint Joseph's; Second round	L 77–81 ^{OT}	22–9	Jon M. Huntsman Center; Salt Lake City, Utah
*Non-conference game. ^{#}Rankings from AP poll. (#) Tournament seedings in parentheses.
