= Jim O'Brien (basketball, born 1950) =

American basketball player and coach

Personal information
- Born: April 9, 1950 (age 76) Brooklyn, New York, U.S.
- Listed height: 6 ft 1 in (1.85 m)
- Listed weight: 170 lb (77 kg)

Career information
- High school: St. Francis Prep (Brooklyn, New York)
- College: Boston College (1968–1971)
- NBA draft: 1971: 4th round, 53rd overall pick
- Drafted by: Buffalo Braves
- Playing career: 1971–1975
- Position: Point guard
- Number: 44, 3, 14
- Coaching career: 1977–2014

Career history

Playing
- 1971: Pittsburgh Condors
- 1972–1973: Kentucky Colonels
- 1974–1975: San Diego Conquistadors

Coaching
- 1977–1982: Connecticut (assistant)
- 1982–1986: St. Bonaventure
- 1986–1997: Boston College
- 1997–2004: Ohio State
- 2011–2014: Emerson

Career highlights
- As coach: Clair Bee Coach of the Year (1999); NABC Coach of the Year (2000); Atlantic 10 co-Coach of the Year (1983); Big East co-Coach of the Year (1996); 2× Big Ten Coach of the Year (1999, 2001); Big East tournament champion (1997)
- Stats at Basketball Reference

James J. O'Brien (born April 9, 1950) is an American college basketball coach who has served as coach of St. Bonaventure University (1982–1986), Boston College (1986–1997), Ohio State University (1997–2004) and Emerson College, a Division III school in Boston (2011–2014).

O'Brien was hired as Ohio State head coach on April 7, 1997, after the firing of previous coach Randy Ayers. O'Brien guided the Buckeye program to the 1999 Final Four, 2000 and 2002 Big Ten regular-season co-championships, the 2002 Big Ten tournament Championship, four 20-win seasons and a school-record four consecutive NCAA tournament appearances (1999–2002).

Ohio State later had to vacate all wins from 1999 to 2002, remove all references to team accomplishments for those years, and pay back all tournament money due to rules violations during O'Brien's tenure. On June 8, 2004, then-Ohio State athletic director Andy Geiger fired O'Brien for alleged NCAA rules violations. The Ohio Court of Claims determined that Ohio State breached its contract with O'Brien by terminating him and awarded him $2.4 million. However, O'Brien was initially given an NCAA "show-cause" order effectively banning him from coaching from 2006 to 2008, and only returned to coaching in 2011.

== Playing career ==
A high school honorable mention All-American at St. Francis Prep in Brooklyn, O'Brien went on to attend and then graduate from Boston College in 1971 with a degree in marketing. He was the recipient of the university's scholar-athlete award as a senior.

O'Brien was a three-year Boston College letterman (1968–71) while playing for Bob Cousy and Chuck Daly and he was team captain in 1970–71. He still holds the school single-game record for assists with 18, vs. Le Moyne December 16, 1970. He scored 1,273 points, a total that ranks 14th on the school's all-time scoring list. He twice won all-East honors and was the New England Player of the Year as a senior. He was elected into the Boston College Varsity Club Hall of Fame in 1976, his first year of eligibility.

He was named to two Boston College all-decade basketball teams (1960s and 1970s). Upon graduation, he was selected by the Buffalo Braves (today the Los Angeles Clippers) in the fourth round of the 1971 NBA draft, but he instead played professionally for the Pittsburgh Condors (1971), the Kentucky Colonels (1972–73) and the San Diego Conquistadors (1974–75) in the American Basketball Association. He played for Wilt Chamberlain at San Diego.

== Early coaching years ==
After his playing career was over, O'Brien jumped into coaching in 1977 as an assistant at the University of Connecticut under Dom Perno. He spent five years there, during which time the Huskies were 91-50 and made three post season appearances.

St. Bonaventure University hired O'Brien in 1982. He stayed four years as head coach before returning to his alma mater in 1986, succeeding Gary Williams who had been named head coach at Ohio State University. He was Atlantic 10 Conference Co-Coach of the Year in 1983, when he led St. Bonaventure to a 20–10 record and a berth in the National Invitation Tournament. Basketball Times named him as its National Rookie Coach of the Year in 1983.

== Head coach at Boston College ==
O'Brien coached for eleven seasons at Boston College. This tenure included NCAA tournament appearances in three of his last four seasons and postseason appearances in five of his last six years. O'Brien was named Big East Co-Coach of the Year honor in 1995–96, Kodak District I Coach of the Year in both 1992 and 1993, and Eastern Basketball Coach of the Year in 1994.

In 1994, O'Brien led Boston College to the Elite Eight in the NCAA tournament and scored back-to-back wins over Indiana and North Carolina. Academics were a strong priority throughout O'Brien's coaching career – in his first 10 years at Boston College, all 25 players who completed their eligibility also earned their degrees.

During his final season at Boston College, O'Brien led the team to the 1997 Big East regular-season and tournament titles.

However, O'Brien began running into problems getting his recruits past the admissions office after star recruit Chris Herren was kicked out of school in 1994 for drug and discipline problems; he eventually transferred to Fresno State.

During 1995–96, at least three prospective recruits were denied admission despite easily meeting NCAA standards. When two Boston-area recruits were turned down in November 1996, O'Brien nearly resigned.

He ultimately left for Ohio State after the 1996–97 season and took nearly all of his players with him, including star freshman point guard Scoonie Penn.

O'Brien subsequently sued Boston College for slander and breach of contract, suggesting racial bias may have played a role in why one of his recruits was denied admission.

== Head coach at Ohio State ==
With Penn and most of the new arrivals forced to sit out the season, O'Brien's first year in Columbus was a long one. The Buckeyes finished with an 8–22 record, including a 1–15 mark in Big Ten play—the school's worst conference record ever.

The following year, however, O'Brien directed the Buckeyes to the 1999 Final Four in St. Petersburg, Florida. Ohio State set numerous school, conference and NCAA records during the 1998–99 season on its way to the school's ninth trip to the Final Four. The 2000 Buckeyes followed that effort by sharing the Big Ten championship with Michigan State. These accomplishments would later be vacated by the NCAA.

The 2001 edition of Ohio State basketball was picked to finish near the bottom of the Big Ten in preseason publications; however O'Brien managed to finish third in the regular season conference standings, winning 20 games and earning the school's 21st (of 24 total) NCAA tournament appearance, all this despite losing its top three scorers from the 1999–2000 season.

The 2002 Buckeyes also were not picked to produce a successful season. Again, O'Brien surprised the critics by guiding the Buckeyes to a share of the 2002 Big Ten regular-season and tournament title, 20 victories and an unprecedented fourth-consecutive trip to the NCAA tournament, a feat never before accomplished at Ohio State.

Following OSU's 1999 Final Four run, O'Brien was honored as the 1999 Clair Bee Coach of the Year. The Naismith Memorial Basketball Hall of Fame presents the award. This honor was one of several including: the 1999 National Coach of the Year given by the Touchdown Club of Columbus; the 1999 National Co-Coach of the Year given by the National Association of Basketball Coaches; the 1999 Big Ten Coach of the Year as selected by the Big Ten media and the 1999 U.S. Basketball Writers Association District 5 Coach of the Year.

He claimed his second Big Ten Coach of the Year award in 2001 when the league media gave him the honor for the second time in three seasons. The 2001 District 10 Coach of the Year Award, given by the National Association of Basketball Coaches, followed the Big Ten honors.

== Firing controversy ==
Ohio State fired O'Brien on June 8, 2004, claiming the coach had admitted to athletic director Andy Geiger that he had provided a $6,000 loan to the mother of one-time recruit Aleksandar Radojević from Serbia after he had signed a national letter of intent in 1999. NCAA rules at the time did not allow players to receive financial assistance from outside their family.

The payment came to light when Kathleen Salyers, a nanny from the Columbus suburb of Gahanna, sued Ohio State boosters Dan and Kim Roslovic. Salyers claimed the Roslovics reneged on an agreement to pay her $1,000 per month plus expenses to care for Ohio State forward Boban Savovic. Savovic couldn't live with the Roslovics due to their status as Ohio State boosters. As part of her deposition, Salyers revealed that O'Brien had made the loan to Radojevic. Radojevic couldn't play collegiately because he'd been paid for playing overseas.

O'Brien claimed Ohio State had improperly fired him and sued the university for $3.5 million in lost wages and benefits. O'Brien argued his loan did not violate NCAA bylaws because he knew Radojevic already had lost his amateur status by playing for money overseas. At trial, Geiger and NCAA lead investigator Steve Duffin both testified that O'Brien made the loan for humanitarian reasons, not as an inducement to get Radojevic to sign with Ohio State.

NCAA infractions committee chairman David Swank testified that O'Brien's actions did not violate NCAA rules.

On February 15, 2006, Judge Joseph T. Clark of the Ohio Court of Claims ruled that Ohio State had breached O'Brien's contract. After the Ohio Supreme Court declined to hear an appeal, Ohio State University paid O'Brien $2.74 million to resolve the case on May 1, 2008.

On March 10, 2006, the NCAA gave Ohio State three years' probation and ordered it to pay back all tournament money earned from 1999 to 2002 when Boban Savovic was on the Buckeyes' roster. In addition, Ohio State was forced to vacate every game it played from 1998–99 to 2001–02, including its 1999 Final Four appearance. O'Brien was also subjected to a five-year "show-cause" order banning him from employment with any NCAA member school. In 2007, the NCAA reduced the term of O'Brien's show-cause order to two years. It also threw out three violations and part of a fourth due to the enforcement staff's own failure to file NCAA rules and procedures.

On January 31, 2008, an NCAA appeals committee lifted all restrictions on O'Brien's hiring.

On May 10, 2011, O'Brien was named head coach at Emerson College. After guiding the Lions to a 34–44 record over three seasons, O'Brien announced his retirement.

== Head coaching record ==
Record table
Season	Team	Overall	Conference	Standing	Postseason
St. Bonaventure Bonnies (Atlantic 10 Conference) (1982–1986)
1982–83	St. Bonaventure	20–10	10–4	T–1st (West)	NIT First Round
1983–84	St. Bonaventure	18–13	8–10	T–6th	
1984–85	St. Bonaventure	14–15	7–11	7th	
1985–86	St. Bonaventure	15–13	10–8	4th	
St. Bonaventure:		67–51	35–33		
Boston College Eagles (Big East Conference) (1986–1997)
1986–87	Boston College	11–18	3–13	8th	
1987–88	Boston College	18–15	6–10	7th	
1988–89	Boston College	12–17	3–13	9th	
1989–90	Boston College	8–20	1–15	9th	
1990–91	Boston College	11–19	1–15	9th	
1991–92	Boston College	17–14	7–11	7th	
1992–93	Boston College	18–13	9–9	7th	
1993–94	Boston College	23–11	11–7	3rd	NCAA Division I Elite Eight
1994–95	Boston College	9–19	2–16	10th	
1995–96	Boston College	19–11	10–8	5th	NCAA Division I Second Round
1996–97	Boston College	22–9	12–6	2nd	NCAA Division I Second Round
Boston College:		168–166	65–114		
Ohio State Buckeyes (Big Ten Conference) (1997–2004)
1997–98	Ohio State	8–22	1–15	11th	
1998–99	Ohio State	27–9*	12–4*	2nd*	NCAA Division I Final Four
1999–00	Ohio State	23–7**	13–3**	T–1st**	NCAA Division I Second Round
2000–01	Ohio State	20–11***	11–5***	3rd***	NCAA Division I First Round
2001–02	Ohio State	24–8***	11–5***	T–1st***	NCAA Division I Second Round
2002–03	Ohio State	17–15	7–9	8th	
2003–04	Ohio State	14–16	6–10	9th	
Ohio State:		51–57****	20–36		
Emerson Lions (Great Northeast Athletic Conference) (2011–2013)
2011–12	Emerson	7–19	6–12	9th	
2012–13	Emerson	15–12	13–5	T–3rd	
Emerson Lions (New England Women's and Men's Athletic Conference) (2013–2014)
2013–14	Emerson	13–13	6–8	5th	
Emerson:		34–44	25–25		
Total:		320–318****			
National champion Postseason invitational champion Conference regular season champion Conference regular season and conference tournament champion Division regular season champion Division regular season and conference tournament champion Conference tournament champion

* Record adjusted to 1–1 after games vacated
** Record adjusted to 11–3 (5–1 in conference) after games vacated
***Record adjusted to 0–0 after games vacated
****Not including vacated games; O'Brien's unofficial record is 133–88 at Ohio State and 402–349 overall

== Family ==
O'Brien has two daughters by his late wife, Christine: Amy Siggens and Erin Wright.

== See also ==
- List of NCAA Division I Men's Final Four appearances by coach
