= 1996–97 Georgetown Hoyas men's basketball team =

American college basketball season

1996–97 Georgetown Hoyas men's basketball

Big East 7 Division Regular Season Champions

NCAA tournament, first round
- Conference: Big East Conference
- Big East 7 Division
- Record: 20-10 (11-7 Big East)
- Head coach: John Thompson (25th season)
- Assistant coaches: Craig Esherick (15th season); Mike Riley (15th season)
- Captain: Cheikh Ya-Ya Dia
- Home arena: USAir Arena

1996–97 Big East men's basketball standings
	Conf.				Overall
Team	W		L	PCT	W		L	PCT
Big East 6
No. 20 Villanova	12	–	6	.667	24	–	10	.706
No. 23 Boston College†	12	–	6	.667	22	–	9	.710
West Virginia	11	–	7	.611	21	–	10	.677
Notre Dame	8	–	10	.444	16	–	14	.533
St. John's	8	–	10	.444	13	–	15	.464
Connecticut	7	–	11	.389	18	–	15	.545
Big East 7
Georgetown	11	–	7	.611	20	–	10	.667
Providence	10	–	8	.556	24	–	12	.667
Pittsburgh	10	–	8	.556	18	–	15	.545
Miami	9	–	9	.500	16	–	13	.552
Syracuse	9	–	9	.500	19	–	13	.594
Seton Hall	5	–	13	.278	10	–	18	.357
Rutgers	5	–	13	.278	11	–	16	.407
† 1997 Big East tournament winner As of March 31, 1997; Rankings from AP poll

The 1996–97 Georgetown Hoyas men's basketball team represented Georgetown University in the 1996–97 NCAA Division I college basketball season. John Thompson, coached them in his 25th season as head coach. Their home court was USAir Arena in Landover, Maryland. They were members of the Big East 7 Division of the Big East Conference, were the regular-season champions of the Big East 7 Division, and finished the season with a record of 20–10, 11–7 in Big East play. Their record earned them a bye in the first round of the 1997 Big East men's basketball tournament, and they advanced to the semifinals before losing to Boston College. They received a No. 10 seed in the West Regional of the 1997 NCAA Division I men's basketball tournament – Georgetown's 18th NCAA Tournament appearance in 19 years – and lost to No. 7 seed North Carolina-Charlotte in the first round.

== Season recap ==
The graduation of center Othella Harrington and forward Jerome Williams in May 1996 and the departure of guard Allen Iverson after his sophomore season the previous year left the Hoyas with an uncertain lineup for 1996-97. Thompson hoped that freshman forward Shamel Jones and junior guard-forward Jerry Nichols would fill the gaps, but they did not rise to the occasion. With Harrington and Williams gone, however, junior forward Boubacar Aw became the leader in the frontcourt, scoring in 29 of the team's 30 games. He scored in double figures 12 times. Junior Jahidi White, meanwhile, took over at center. In an early Big East game against Seton Hall in December 1996, he scored 12 points and had 16 rebounds, and against Massachusetts two days later he scored 14 points and blocked six shots. He blocked at least one shot in 27 of the team's 30 games and finished the year averaging 7.3 points, 6.4 rebounds, and 1.9 blocked shots per game for the season.

Sophomore point guard Victor Page was the star of the team. He continued his high-scoring performance of the previous season, leading the team in scoring in 27 of its 30 games and scoring 20 or more points 21 times during the year and 25 or more points four times by the end of January 1997. The team opened 8-1, but despite Page's efforts, it fell to 11-7 overall and a 4-6 conference record with an 89-71 loss at USAir Arena to Pittsburgh on January 25, 1997. With 14th-ranked Villanova scheduled next and six of their remaining eight games on the road, the Hoyas' hopes of making even the National Invitation Tournament (NIT), let alone the NCAA tournament, were beginning to fade.

Georgetown hosted Villanova two days after the loss to Pittsburgh. The Hoyas had a tremendous first half and led by as many as 21 points before Villanova went on a 17–0 run early in the second half. The Wildcats managed to close to only a two-point deficit at 53–51, but Georgetown's defense then made a strong stand. Late in the game, the Hoyas scored seven unanswered points to secure a 78-67 upset win.

The Villanova win began a February streak that turned the Hoyas' season around; they won eight of their last nine regular-season games. Four days after beating Villanova, they visited St. John's at Madison Square Garden and Page, after missing his first nine shots, scored the game winner as Georgetown prevailed 71–68. After that, Page led the way in Georgetown's late-season surge, scoring 26 points against Syracuse, 26 again four days later against Providence at USAir Arena, 20 at Pittsburgh, 29 at Memphis, 25 against Rutgers, and 28 points against Providence at the Providence Civic Center in the regular-season finale.

The victory over Providence gave Georgetown the Big East 7 Division championship for the second year in a row and a No. 2 seed and first-round bye in the 1997 Big East tournament. In the quarterfinals, Page scored 31 points as Georgetown defeated Miami. In the semifinals, Boston College's defense held Page to 18 points, and the Eagles beat the Hoyas on their way to winning the tournament championship.

Georgetown was the No. 10 seed in the West Region of the 1997 NCAA tournament. In the first round, the Hoyas met No. 7 seed North Carolina-Charlotte. Aw scored a career-high 16 points and pulled down nine rebounds before fouling out, but the 49ers' defense held Page to 7-for-22 (31.8%) shooting from the field, and Charlotte won 79–67 to knock Georgetown out of the tournament. Page finished the year averaging 22.7 points per game for the season and 17.1 points per game for his career.

The hope that Page would emerge as the next Allen Iverson was dashed in March 1997, when he opted to follow Iverson's lead of the year before and break with the Georgetown tradition of playing a full four years, leaving school to enter the NBA draft. During the summer of 1997, Shamel Jones and Jerry Nichols transferred to Memphis and Mississippi Valley State, respectively, and in August 1997 guard Ed Sheffey was dismissed from the team before beginning his sophomore season and transferred to New Mexico State. The breakdown of Georgetown tradition of graduating its players led to criticism of Thompson's recruitment practices, which some observers believed led to the pre-graduation loss of players by signing too many players with troubled backgrounds or without real academic inclination. Thompson responded that he had no apology for recruiting players from poor families if they had talent and did not take into account the likelihood that they would stay for a full four years when he recruited them, adding that he believed that Georgetown University contributed positively to their lives even if they left before graduating.

Thanks to the difficult offseason, the Hoyas would have a depleted roster for the 1997–98 season. Georgetown would not return to the NCAA Tournament until the 2000–01 season. During each of the three intervening seasons, the Hoyas would appear in the National Invitation Tournament instead.

== Roster ==
#	Name	Height	Weight (lbs.)	Position	Class	Hometown	Previous Team(s)
4	Joseph Touomou	6'2"	195	G	So.	Yaounde, Cameroon	Williamston HS (Williamston, NC)
11	Daymond Jackson	6'4"	205	G/F	So.	Alexandria, VA, U.S.	T. C. Williams HS
12	Dean Berry	5'10"	168	G	So.	Brooklyn, NY, U.S.	Episcopal HS
14	Cheikh Ya-Ya Dia	6'9"	233	F	Sr.	Dakar, Senegal	St. John's Prep-Prospect Hall (Maryland)
15	Shernard Long	6'5"	190	G/F	Fr.	Tucker, GA, U.S.	Tucker HS
20	Damien Bolden	6'3"	180	G	Fr.	Portland, OR, U.S.	Lincoln HS
22	Boubacar Aw	6'7"	228	F	Jr.	Thiès, Senegal	East Columbus HS (Lake Waccamaw, NC)
24	Rhese Gibson	6'8"	230	F	Fr.	New York, NY, U.S.	All Hallows HS
25	Jerry Nichols	6'4"	210	G/F	Jr.	Jackson, MS, U.S.	Lanier HS
30	Ed Sheffey	6'0"	185	G	Fr.	Washington, DC, U.S.	Oak Hill Academy (Virginia)
32	Godwin Owinje	6'8"	210	F	So.	Benin City, Nigeria	Bismarck State Junior College (North Dakota)
33	Jahidi White	6'9"	290	C	Jr.	St. Louis, MO, U.S.	Cardinal Ritter College Prep HS
40	Jameel Watkins	6'10"	244	C	Fr.	Brooklyn, NY, U.S.	Paul Robeson HS
44	Victor Page	6'3"	200	G	So.	Washington, DC, U.S.	McKinley Technology HS (Washington, DC); Winchendon Prep (Winchendon, MA)
50	Shamel Jones	6'9"	220	F	Fr.	Brooklyn, NY, U.S.	Paul Robeson HS

== Rankings ==
The team was not ranked in the Top 25 in the AP Poll at any time. It also was not ranked in the Top 25 of the final or postseason Coaches' Poll; its Coaches' Poll rankings during the rest of the season are not available.

== 1996–97 Schedule and results ==
Sources

- All times are Eastern

Date time, TV	Rank^{#}	Opponent^{#}	Result	Record	Site (attendance) city, state
Regular Season
Sat., Nov. 23, 1996*		at Cleveland State	W 77−67	1–0	CSU Convocation Center (9,586); Cleveland, OH
Tue., Nov. 26, 1996*		Alabama State	W 75−37	2–0	USAir Arena (7,090); Landover, MD
Sat., Nov. 30, 1996*		DePaul	W 68−41	3–0	USAir Arena (N/A); Landover, MD
Mon., Dec. 2, 1996		Seton Hall	W 55−51	4–0 (1–0)	USAir Arena (7,173); Landover, MD
Wed., Dec. 4, 1996*		vs. Massachusetts; Great Eight tournament	W 58−53	5–0	United Center (19,124); Chicago, IL
Sat., Dec. 7, 1996		at Rutgers	L 68−75	5–1 (1–1)	Louis Brown Athletic Center (6,123); Piscataway, NJ
Tue., Dec. 10, 1996*		Delaware State	W 87–51	6–1	USAir Arena (N/A); Landover, MD
Wed., Dec. 18, 1996*		Saint Leo	W 90–39	7–1	USAir Arena (N/A); Landover, MD
Sat., Dec. 21, 1996*		Morgan State	W 92−64	8–1	USAir Arena (7,835); Landover, MD
Sun., Dec. 29, 1996*		vs. Pacific	L 56–73	8–2	Thomas & Mack Center (2,000); Las Vegas, NV
Thu., Jan. 2, 1997		at West Virginia	W 70−68	9–2 (2–1)	WVU Coliseum (9,652); Morgantown, WV
Sat., Jan. 4, 1997		Miami	L 67−69	9–3 (2–2)	USAir Arena (10,752); Landover, MD
Tue., Jan. 7, 1997		Notre Dame	W 70–57	10–3 (3–2)	USAir Arena (8,438); Landover, MD
Sat., Jan. 11, 1997		Connecticut; Rivalry	L 54–69	10–4 (3–3)	USAir Arena (12,181); Landover, MD
Mon., Jan. 13, 1997		at No. 19 Boston College	L 74–81	10–5 (3–4)	Silvio O. Conte Forum (8,606); Chestnut Hill, MA
Sat., Jan. 18, 1997		at Miami	L 65–68 ^{OT}	10–6 (3–5)	Miami Arena (10,419); Miami, FL
Tue., Jan. 21, 1997		St. John's	W 62–57	11–6 (4–5)	USAir Arena (7,864); Landover, MD
Sat., Jan. 25, 1997		Pittsburgh	L 71–89	11–7 (4–6)	USAir Arena (12,086); Landover, MD
Mon., Jan. 27, 1997		No. 14 Villanova	W 78–67	12−7 (5–6)	USAir Arena (11,891); Landover, MD
Sat., Feb. 1, 1997		at St. John's	W 71–68	13−7 (6–6)	Madison Square Garden (13,121); New York, NY
Mon., Feb. 3, 1997		at Connecticut; Rivalry	W 52–51	14–7 (7–6)	Hartford Civic Center (15,842); Hartford, CT
Sat., Feb. 8, 1997; 2:00 p.m., CBS		at Syracuse; Rivalry	L 74–77	14–8 (7–7)	Carrier Dome (29,877); Syracuse, NY
Wed., Feb. 12, 1997		Providence	W 75–69	15–8 (8–7)	USAir Arena (9,141); Landover, MD
Thu., Feb. 20, 1997		at Pittsburgh	W 76–57	16–8 (9–7)	Civic Arena (15,127); Pittsburgh, PA
Sat., Feb. 22, 1997*		at Memphis	W 74–65	17–8	Pyramid Arena (14,823); Memphis, TN
Wed., Feb. 26, 1997		Rutgers	W 69–59	18–8 (10–7)	USAir Arena (11,017); Landover, MD
Sat., Mar. 1, 1997		at Providence	W 67–56	19–8 (11–7)	Providence Civic Center (12,993); Providence, RI
Big East tournament
Thu., Mar. 6, 1997		vs. Miami; Quarterfinal	W 63–59	20–8	Madison Square Garden (16,000); New York, NY
Fri., Mar. 7, 1997		vs. Boston College; Semifinal	L 58–70	20–9	Madison Square Garden (18,944); New York, NY
NCAA tournament
Fri., Mar. 14, 1997; CBS		vs. North Carolina-Charlotte; First Round	L 67–79	20–10	McKale Memorial Center (12,958); Tucson, AZ
*Non-conference game. ^{#}Rankings from AP Poll. (#) Tournament seedings in parentheses.
