= Cheikh Yaya Dia =

Senegalese basketball player

Cheick Yaya Dia
Personal information
- Born: 20 March 1974 (age 52) Dakar, Senegal
- Listed height: 6 ft 9 in (2.06 m)
- Listed weight: 242 lb (110 kg)

Career information
- High school: St. John's at Prospect Hall (Frederick, Maryland)
- College: Georgetown (1993–1997)
- NBA draft: 1997: undrafted
- Playing career: 1997–2008
- Position: Power forward / center

Career history
- 1998: Aguada
- 1998–1999: Regatas San Nicolás
- 1999: Aguada
- 1999–2001: West Sydney Razorbacks
- 2001: Quilmes
- 2001–2002: Sutor Montegranaro
- 2003–2004: Lokomotiv Novosibirsk
- 2004–2005: Maccabi Haifa
- 2005: Karşıyaka
- 2005–2006: Blue Stars Beirut
- 2006: Arena Amman
- 2006–2007: West Sydney Razorbacks
- 2007: Halcones UV Córdoba
- 2007: Belgrano de San Nicolás
- 2008: Boca Juniors
- 2008: Al-Fateh

Career highlights
- Big East Most Improved Player (1997)
Medals
Men's basketball
Representing Senegal
FIBA Africa Championship
| Gold medal – first place | 1997 Dakar | Team competition |

Cheikh Yaya Dia (born 20 March 1974) is a Senegalese former professional basketball player. After growing up in Dakar, Dia moved to the United States and he played high school basketball at St. John's at Prospect Hall in Maryland; he then went on to play 4 years in college at Georgetown, where he was named the Big East Most Improved Player in his senior season in 1997. After going undrafted in the 1997 NBA draft, Dia started his professional career in Uruguay. Throughout his career he has played in Uruguay, Argentina, Australia, Italy, Russia, Israel, Turkey, Jordan, Lebanon, Mexico and Saudi Arabia. Dia was also a member of the Senegalese national basketball team, with which he won the gold medal during the 1997 FIBA Africa Championship and participated in the 1998 FIBA World Championship.

== High school career ==
Dia was born in Dakar, and growing up in Senegal he spoke French and Wolof. Dia's full name is Cheikh Yaya Dia, with Cheikh and Yaya being his given names and Dia being his surname. His middle name is also mistakenly spelled "Ya Ya" or "Ya-Ya", and some non-Senegalese sources erroneously cited it as a nickname.

Dia played mostly soccer in his childhood years, until he became taller than most of his peers: at 15 years old, he began playing basketball. While playing in Senegal, Dia was noticed by a scout, who suggested that he come to the United States, play one year in high school, and then sign with a college. Dia accepted and left Senegal, settling in Maryland, where he attended St. John's at Prospect Hall in Frederick. In his only season there, Dia averaged 8.5 points, 5.2 rebounds and 3.2 blocks per game, playing as a center on a team that was named the 8th best in the nation by USA Today. In March 1993, Dia was named an Honorable Mention All-Area selection.

== College career ==
Dia signed to play for Georgetown in August 1993, having already talked with the program's coaching staff during his recruitment process in Senegal. Under coach John Thompson, Dia received limited playing time as a freshman at 8 minutes per game; he scored 12 points against UC Irvine on 18 December 1993 in one of the few games in which he scored points: he averaged 1.7 points for the season, along with 2.5 rebounds and 0.8 blocks per game. Dia also appeared in 2 games during the 1994 NCAA tournament, playing 1 minute (recording no stats) against Illinois, and 11 minutes against Arkansas, scoring 5 points and posting 2 rebounds.

In Dia's sophomore season another Senegalese player, Boubacar Aw, joined the Georgetown Hoyas. Dia received less playing time in 1994–95 (5.7 minutes per game), and posted career lows in points (1.6) and rebounds (1.8). In his junior year, Dia played all 37 games, always as a reserve, and improved his averages to 2.9 points and 3.9 rebounds, while shooting a career-high 53.3% from the field. During the 1996 NCAA tournament, Dia played 4 games, scoring 10 points along with 6 rebounds in the first game against Mississippi Valley State in 22 minutes of play. He then played the other three games averaging 1.3 points in limited minutes.

After the end of the 1995–96 season, Georgetown lost two of its main frontcourt players, Othella Harrington and Jerome Williams, and Dia was included in the starting lineup by coach Thompson, being named team captain. Dia received significant playing time, and in 32.2 minutes he greatly improved his rebounding, averaging 10.1 per game, leading the Big East in rebounds per game and total rebounds, posting 13 games in which he at least had 10 rebounds. He grabbed 14 rebounds in games against Notre Dame and Boston College, and he had a career-high 18 rebounds on 26 February 1997 against Rutgers, one of the best marks in Georgetown history. Dia also recorded 10 games scoring double figures. At the end of the season, Dia was named the Big East Most Improved Player, and received the Big East Scholar Athlete of the Year award.

=== College statistics ===
| Year | Team | GP | GS | MPG | FG% | 3P% | FT% | RPG | APG | SPG | BPG | PPG |
|---|---|---|---|---|---|---|---|---|---|---|---|---|
| 1993–94 | Georgetown | 28 | 0 | 8.0 | .423 | .000 | .333 | 2.5 | 0.1 | 0.2 | 0.8 | 1.7 |
| 1994–95 | Georgetown | 12 | 0 | 5.7 | .444 | .000 | 1.000 | 1.8 | 0.3 | 0.0 | 0.4 | 1.6 |
| 1995–96 | Georgetown | 37 | 0 | 12.8 | .533 | .000 | .611 | 3.9 | 0.6 | 0.4 | 0.6 | 2.9 |
| 1996–97 | Georgetown | 30 | 30 | 32.2 | .418 | .000 | .617 | 10.1 | 1.8 | 0.6 | 2.3 | 8.1 |
| Career | | 107 | 30 | 16.2 | .445 | .000 | .597 | 5.1 | 0.8 | 0.4 | 1.1 | 3.9 |

== Professional career ==
After his senior season at Georgetown, Dia was automatically eligible for the 1997 NBA draft. Dia participated in trials with several NBA teams, among which the Miami Heat, the Milwaukee Bucks and the Washington Wizards. The Courier News from New Jersey mentioned Dia as an NBA prospect in a February 1997 article. Despite interest from NBA teams, Dia went undrafted; he was drafted in the 1997 Continental Basketball Association (CBA) draft, being selected in the 3rd round (29th overall pick) by the Grand Rapids Hoops. The Hoops waived Dia in November, and he signed with Uruguayan club Aguada in early 1998. After one season in the Liga Uruguaya de Basketball, Dia moved to Argentina, where he played for Regatas San Nicolás. He appeared in 6 games with the club, averaging 11.8 points and 7.7 rebounds in 32.3 minutes per game. He then went back to Aguada in 1999, and averaged 19.1 points, 10 rebounds, and 2.5 blocks per game.

His performances in Uruguay earned him the interest of the West Sydney Razorbacks, that signed him in July 1999, as the team needed a center. In the 1999–2000 NBL season Dia played 31 games, averaging 13 points, 8.4 rebounds, and 1.9 blocks per game. He stayed with the Razorbacks also for the following season, during which he posted 15.9 points, 9 rebounds, and 1.9 blocks per game.

Dia left Australia in 2001 and played for the Argentinian club Quilmes in the Liga Nacional de Básquet: he averaged 15.7 points and 9.7 rebounds over 14 appearances. He then went to Europe for the first time in his career: in July 2001 he signed for Italian LegaDue side Sutor Montegranaro. With his new team he played 36 league games, averaging 16.3 points, 10.2 rebounds, and 1 block per game, playing as a forward. In 2003 he signed for the Russian team Lokomotiv Novosibirsk, and played 28 games in the 2003–04 Russian Super League, averaging 15.5 points and 10.1 rebounds per game. In 2004 he moved to Israel, and joined Maccabi Haifa. He appeared in 11 games in the Israeli Premier League, posting averages of 14.1 points and 8.5 rebounds.

In 2005 Dia moved to another European country, Turkey: he appeared in 6 games during the 2005–06 Turkish Basketball League with Karşıyaka S.K., playing 22.5 minutes per game (4.7 points and 4.7 rebounds per game). Later in 2005 he signed for Lebanese team Blue Stars of Beirut. In the 2005–06 Lebanese Basketball League he ranked 4th in the league in rebounding with 12.2 per game.

After playing in Jordan with Arena Amman, in October 2006 he went back to Australia and signed another contract with the West Sydney Razorbacks. He played 32 games during the 2006–07 NBL season, averaging 11.1 points and 6.9 rebounds per game. In 2007 he joined the Mexican team Halcones UV Córdoba of the Liga Nacional de Baloncesto Profesional. In November 2007 Dia joined Belgrano de San Nicolás, another Argentinian club. After 12 games (11.1 points, 6.4 rebounds) Dia left the team and signed for Boca Juniors, where he played 7 games (5.9 points, 3.3 rebounds). He retired after playing with Al-Fateh in Saudi Arabia.

== National team career ==
Dia was first called up to the Senegalese national team in 1991. In 1997 he was part of the squad that won the gold medal at the 1997 FIBA Africa Championship. He then took part in the 1998 FIBA World Championship, playing 5 games averaging 9 points, 5.4 rebounds and 1 assist per game: he had a double-double against Japan with 10 points and 10 rebounds, and scored 16 points South Korea. According to Senegalese press agency Agence de Presse Sénégalaise, Cheikh Yaya Dia and teammate Boubacar Aw did not accept any call-up from the national team after 1998.
