= 1996–97 St. John's Red Storm men's basketball team =

American college basketball season

1996–1997 St. John's Red Storm men's basketball

ECAC Holiday Festival Champions
- Conference: Big East Conference (1979–2013)
- Record: 13–14 (8–10 Big East)
- Head coach: Fran Fraschilla (1st year)
- Assistant coaches: Ron Rutledge; Darren Savino; Brian Cousins
- Home arena: Alumni Hall; Madison Square Garden

1996–97 Big East men's basketball standings
	Conf.				Overall
Team	W		L	PCT	W		L	PCT
Big East 6
No. 20 Villanova	12	–	6	.667	24	–	10	.706
No. 23 Boston College†	12	–	6	.667	22	–	9	.710
West Virginia	11	–	7	.611	21	–	10	.677
Notre Dame	8	–	10	.444	16	–	14	.533
St. John's	8	–	10	.444	13	–	15	.464
Connecticut	7	–	11	.389	18	–	15	.545
Big East 7
Georgetown	11	–	7	.611	20	–	10	.667
Providence	10	–	8	.556	24	–	12	.667
Pittsburgh	10	–	8	.556	18	–	15	.545
Miami	9	–	9	.500	16	–	13	.552
Syracuse	9	–	9	.500	19	–	13	.594
Seton Hall	5	–	13	.278	10	–	18	.357
Rutgers	5	–	13	.278	11	–	16	.407
† 1997 Big East tournament winner As of March 31, 1997; Rankings from AP poll

The 1996–97 St. John's Red Storm men's basketball team represented St. John's University during the 1996–97 NCAA Division I men's basketball season. The team was coached by Fran Fraschilla in his first year at the school after replacing Brian Mahoney. St. John's home games are played at Alumni Hall and Madison Square Garden and the team is a member of the Big East Conference.

== Off season ==
=== Departures ===
Name	Number	Pos.	Height	Weight	Year	Hometown	Notes
Maurice Brown	5	G	5'9"		Senior		Graduated
Thomas Bayne	22	F	6'10"		Senior		Graduated
Derek Brown	23	G	6'3"		RS Senior		Graduated
Rowan Barrett	24	G/F	6'5"		Senior		Graduated. Entered 1997 NBA draft
Fred Lyson	44	G/F	6'7"		RS Junior		Transferred

=== Class of 1996 signees ===
College recruiting information
Name	Hometown	School	Height	Weight	Commit date
Lavor Postell; SF	Albany, GA	Westover High School	6 ft 5 in (1.96 m)	N/A	
Lavor Postell; SF	Recruit ratings: No ratings found				
Chudney Gray; PG	Bronx, NY	Rice High School	6 ft 3 in (1.91 m)	N/A	
Chudney Gray; PG	Recruit ratings: No ratings found				
Collin Charles; PG	Toronto, Ontario	Eastern Commerce Collegiate Institute	5 ft 11 in (1.80 m)	N/A	
Collin Charles; PG	Recruit ratings: No ratings found				
Overall recruit ranking:
Note: In many cases, Scout, Rivals, 247Sports, On3, and ESPN may conflict in their listings of height and weight.; In these cases, the average was taken. ESPN grades are on a 100-point scale.; Sources: "1996 Team Ranking". Rivals.

== Roster ==
1996–97 St. John's Red Storm men's basketball team
Players
Coaches

Pos.	#	Name	Height	Weight	Year	Previous school	Hometown
G	3	Chudney Gray	6 ft 3 in (1.91 m)	—	Fr	Rice	Bronx, NY
G	4	Tarik Turner	6 ft 5 in (1.96 m)	—	Jr	Oak Hill	Charlottesville, VA
G	10	Kareem Syed	6 ft 5 in (1.96 m)	—	Fr	Hillcrest	Queens, NY
G	11	Collin Charles	5 ft 11 in (1.8 m)	—	Fr	Eastern Commerce	Toronto, Ontario
G	13	Felipe López	6 ft 5 in (1.96 m)	—	Jr	Rice	Santo Domingo, D.R.
F	14	Ed Brown	6 ft 8 in (2.03 m)	—	So	Copiague	Copiague, NY
F/C	21	Mike Menniefield	6 ft 8 in (2.03 m)	—	Sr	Southside/Spartanburg Methodist	Greenville, SC
F	25	Lavor Postell	6 ft 5 in (1.96 m)	—	Fr	Westover	Albany, GA
C	31	Zendon Hamilton	6 ft 9 in (2.06 m)	—	Jr	Sewanhaka	Floral Park, NY
F	32	Tyrone Grant	6 ft 7 in (2.01 m)	—	So	Grady	Brooklyn, NY
F	34	Charles Minlend	6 ft 6 in (1.98 m)	—	RS Sr	St. Thomas More	Yaounde, Cameroon

Head coach

- Fran Fraschilla (Brooklyn College)

Assistant coach(es)

- Ron Rutledge
- Darren Savino
- Brian Cousins

Legend

- (C) Team captain
- (S) Suspended
- (I) Ineligible
- (W) Walk-on
- Injured
- Current redshirt

== Schedule and results ==
Date time, TV	Rank^{#}	Opponent^{#}	Result	Record	Site city, state
Regular season
11/23/96*		LIU Brooklyn	L 73-76	0-1	Alumni Hall; Queens, NY
11/30/96*		Hofstra	W 77-54	1-1	Alumni Hall; Queens, NY
12/03/96		Miami (F.L.)	W 61-57	2-1 (1-0)	Miami Arena; Miami, FL
12/07/96		No. 5 Villanova	L 70-82	2-2 (1-1)	Madison Square Garden; New York, NY
12/11/96*		No. 5 Michigan	L 61-76	2-3	Nassau Coliseum; Uniondale, NY
12/15/96*		at No. 17 Minnesota	L 39-77	2-4	Williams Arena; Minneapolis, MN
12/21/96*		Fairleigh Dickinson	W 77-50	3-4	Alumni Hall; Queens, NY
12/26/96*		Manhattan; ECAC Holiday Festival Semifinal	W 68-61	4-4	Madison Square Garden; New York, NY
12/28/96*		Georgia Tech; ECAC Holiday Festival Championship	W 67-55	5-4	Madison Square Garden; New York, NY
01/02/97		at Providence	W 77-67	5-5 (1-2)	Providence Civic Center; Providence, RI
01/04/97		Pittsburgh	W 75-64	6-5 (2-2)	Madison Square Garden; New York, NY
01/08/97		at Connecticut	W 71-67 ^{OT}	7-5 (3-2)	Gampel Pavilion; Storrs, CT
01/12/97		West Virginia	L 77-90	7-6 (3-3)	Alumni Hall; Queens, NY
01/14/97*		at Niagara	W 62-40	8-6	Gallagher Center; Niagara, NY
01/18/97		at Pittsburgh	W 60-55	9-6 (4-3)	Fitzgerald Field House; Pittsburgh, PA
01/21/97		at Georgetown	L 57-62	9-7 (4-4)	USAir Arena; Landover, MD
01/25/97		Providence	L 59-72	9-8 (4-5)	Madison Square Garden; New York, NY
01/29/97		Rutgers	L 47-49	9-9 (4-6)	Madison Square Garden; New York, NY
02/01/97		Georgetown	L 68-71	9-10 (4-7)	Madison Square Garden; New York, NY
02/04/97		at Notre Dame	L 70-75	9-11 (4-8)	Joyce Center; Notre Dame, IN
02/09/97		Boston College	L 80-81 ^{OT}	9-12 (4-9)	Madison Square Garden; New York, NY
02/12/97		Syracuse	W 91-87	10-12 (5-9)	Madison Square Garden; New York, NY
02/15/97		at Rutgers	W 73-58	11-12 (6-9)	Louis Brown Athletic Center; Piscataway, NJ
02/19/97		at No. 19 Villanova	L 54-65	11-13 (6-10)	CoreStates Center; Philadelphia, PA
02/22/97		Miami (F.L.)	W 77-73	12-13 (7-10)	Alumni Hall; Queens, NY
02/26/97		at Seton Hall	W 66-62	13-13 (8-10)	Continental Airlines Arena; East Rutherford, NJ
Big East tournament
03/05/97		vs. Miami (F.L.); Big East tournament first round	L 68-76 ^{OT}	13-14	Madison Square Garden; New York, NY
*Non-conference game. ^{#}Rankings from AP Poll. (#) Tournament seedings in parentheses.
