= 1997 Big East men's basketball tournament =

- Classification: Division I
- Season: 1996–97
- Teams: 13
- Site: Madison Square Garden; New York City
- Champions: Boston College (1st title)
- Winning coach: Jim O'Brien (1st title)
- MVP: Scoonie Penn (Boston College)

1996–97 Big East men's basketball standings
	Conf.				Overall
Team	W		L	PCT	W		L	PCT
Big East 6
No. 20 Villanova	12	–	6	.667	24	–	10	.706
No. 23 Boston College†	12	–	6	.667	22	–	9	.710
West Virginia	11	–	7	.611	21	–	10	.677
Notre Dame	8	–	10	.444	16	–	14	.533
St. John's	8	–	10	.444	13	–	15	.464
Connecticut	7	–	11	.389	18	–	15	.545
Big East 7
Georgetown	11	–	7	.611	20	–	10	.667
Providence	10	–	8	.556	24	–	12	.667
Pittsburgh	10	–	8	.556	18	–	15	.545
Miami	9	–	9	.500	16	–	13	.552
Syracuse	9	–	9	.500	19	–	13	.594
Seton Hall	5	–	13	.278	10	–	18	.357
Rutgers	5	–	13	.278	11	–	16	.407
† 1997 Big East tournament winner As of March 31, 1997; Rankings from AP poll

The 1997 Big East men's basketball tournament took place at Madison Square Garden in New York City. Its winner received the Big East Conference's automatic bid to the 1997 NCAA tournament. It is a single-elimination tournament with four rounds and the three highest seeds received byes in the first round. All 13 Big East teams were invited to participate. Boston College and Villanova finished with the best record in the regular season. After tie-breakers, Villanova was awarded the top seed.

Boston College defeated Villanova in the final, 70–58 to earn its first Big East tournament championship. Future NFL quarterback Donovan McNabb participated in the tournament as a reserve forward for Syracuse.

== Bracket ==
First round
8	Syracuse	84
9	Notre Dame	66
4	Providence	77
13	Rutgers	56
5	West Virginia	77
12	Seton Hall	57
6	Pittsburgh	63
11	Connecticut	62
7	Miami	76^{OT}
10	St. John's	68

Second round
1	#21 Villanova	80
8	Syracuse	70
4	Providence	76
5	West Virginia	69
3	Boston College	76
6	Pittsburgh	68
2	Georgetown	63
7	Miami	59

Semifinals
1	#21 Villanova	73
4	Providence	63
3	Boston College	70
2	Georgetown	58

Championship Game
1	#21 Villanova	58
3	Boston College	70

== Awards ==
Dave Gavitt Trophy (Most Outstanding Player): Scoonie Penn, Boston College

All-Tournament Team

- Danya Abrams, Boston College
- Victor Page, Georgetown
- Scoonie Penn, Boston College
- Tim Thomas, Villanova
- Alvin Williams, Villanova
- Duane Woodward, Boston College
