= 1996–97 Connecticut Huskies men's basketball team =

American college basketball season

1996–97 Connecticut Huskies men's basketball

NIT, Third place
- Conference: Big East Conference
- Record: 18–15 (7–11 Big East)
- Head coach: Jim Calhoun (11th season)
- Assistant coaches: Karl Hobbs; Dave Leitao; Tom Moore
- Home arena: Hartford Civic Center; Harry A. Gampel Pavilion

1996–97 Big East men's basketball standings
| | Conf. | | | | Overall |
| Team | W | | L | PCT | W | | L | PCT |
|---|---|---|---|---|---|---|---|---|
Big East 6
| No. 20 Villanova | 12 | – | 6 | .667 | 24 | – | 10 | .706 |
| No. 23 Boston College† | 12 | – | 6 | .667 | 22 | – | 9 | .710 |
| West Virginia | 11 | – | 7 | .611 | 21 | – | 10 | .677 |
| Notre Dame | 8 | – | 10 | .444 | 16 | – | 14 | .533 |
| St. John's | 8 | – | 10 | .444 | 13 | – | 15 | .464 |
| Connecticut | 7 | – | 11 | .389 | 18 | – | 15 | .545 |
Big East 7
| Georgetown | 11 | – | 7 | .611 | 20 | – | 10 | .667 |
| Providence | 10 | – | 8 | .556 | 24 | – | 12 | .667 |
| Pittsburgh | 10 | – | 8 | .556 | 18 | – | 15 | .545 |
| Miami | 9 | – | 9 | .500 | 16 | – | 13 | .552 |
| Syracuse | 9 | – | 9 | .500 | 19 | – | 13 | .594 |
| Seton Hall | 5 | – | 13 | .278 | 10 | – | 18 | .357 |
| Rutgers | 5 | – | 13 | .278 | 11 | – | 16 | .407 |
† 1997 Big East tournament winner As of March 31, 1997; Rankings from AP poll

The 1996–97 Connecticut Huskies men's basketball team represented the University of Connecticut in the 1996–97 collegiate men's basketball season. The Huskies completed the season with an 18–15 overall record. The Huskies were members of the Big East Conference where they finished with a 7–11 record.

They came in Third Place in the 1997 National Invitation Tournament. The Huskies played their home games at Harry A. Gampel Pavilion in Storrs, Connecticut and the Hartford Civic Center in Hartford, Connecticut, and they were led by eleventh-year head coach Jim Calhoun.

== Roster ==
Listed are the student athletes who were members of the 1996–1997 team.

| Name | Position | Year |
|---|---|---|
| Dion Carson | G | SR |
| Kyle Chapman | G | SR |
| Kevin Freeman | F | FR |
| Sam Funches | F | FR |
| Richard Hamilton | F/G | FR |
| Monquencio Hardnett | G | JR |
| Ruslan Inyatkin | F | JR |
| Rashamel Jones | F/G | SO |
| Kirk King | F | SR |
| Antric Klaiber | F/C | SO |
| Michael Leblanc | F | FR |
| Pete McCann | G | FR |
| Ricky Moore | G | SO |
| Jake Voskuhl | C | FR |

== Schedule ==
| Date time, TV | Rank^{#} | Opponent^{#} | Result | Record | Site (attendance) city, state |
Regular Season
| 11/15/1996*; ESPN | | vs. No. 24 Indiana; The Classic | L 61–68 | 0–1 | RCA Dome (32,250); Indianapolis |
| 11/25/1996*; WTNH | | Northeastern | W 89–37 | 1–1 | Hartford Civic Center (13,005); Hartford, Connecticut |
| 11/29/1996*; WTNH | | Yale | W 72–39 | 2–1 | Hartford Civic Center (14,529); Hartford, Connecticut |
| 12/2/1996*; WTNH | | Southwest Texas State | W 66–49 | 3–1 | Hartford Civic Center (14,104); Hartford, Connecticut |
| 12/4/1996; WTNH | | at Pittsburgh | L 49–56 | 3–2 (0–1) | Civic Arena (9,537); Pittsburgh |
| 12/7/1996; WTNH | | No. 20 Boston College | W 61–54 | 4–2 (1–1) | Harry A. Gampel Pavilion (10,027); Storrs, Connecticut |
| 12/21/1996*; WTNH | | Fairfield | W 68–58 | 5–2 | Hartford Civic Center (14,918); Hartford, Connecticut |
| 12/23/1996*; WTNH | | Virginia | W 64–61 | 6–2 | Harry A. Gampel Pavilion (10,027); Storrs, Connecticut |
| 12/27/1996*; ESPN | | Massachusetts; MassMutual UGame | W 64–61 | 7–2 | Hartford Civic Center (14,389); Hartford, Connecticut |
| 12/29/1996*; WTNH | | Hartford | W 104–62 | 8–2 | Hartford Civic Center (13,793); Hartford, Connecticut |
| 1/2/1997; WTNH | | at Rutgers | W 66–57 | 9–2 (2–1) | Louis Brown Athletic Center (5,806); Piscataway, New Jersey |
| 1/4/1997; WTNH | | West Virginia | W 79–62 | 10–2 (3–1) | Hartford Civic Center (15,358); Hartford, Connecticut |
| 1/8/1997; WTNH | | St. John's | L 67–71 ^{OT} | 10–3 (3–2) | Harry A. Gampel Pavilion (10,027); Storrs, Connecticut |
| 1/11/1997; WTNH | | at Georgetown; Rivalry | W 69–54 | 11–3 (4–2) | Capital Centre (12,181); Landover, Maryland |
| 1/19/1997*; CBS | | No. 1 Kansas | L 65–73 | 11–4 | Hartford Civic Center (16,294); Hartford, Connecticut |
| 1/22/1997; WTNH | | at Miami | L 46–69 | 11–5 (4–3) | Miami Arena (6,662); Miami |
| 1/26/1997; CBS | | Syracuse; Rivalry | L 53–65 | 11–6 (4–4) | Hartford Civic Center (16,294); Hartford, Connecticut |
| 1/29/1997; ESPN | | Providence | L 47–62 | 11–7 (4–5) | Harry A. Gampel Pavilion (10,027); Storrs, Connecticut |
| 2/1/1997; WTNH | | at Seton Hall | W 62–55 | 12–7 (5–5) | Continental Airlines Arena (15,141); East Rutherford, New Jersey |
| 2/3/1997; ESPN | | Georgetown; Rivalry | L 51–52 | 12–8 (5–6) | Hartford Civic Center (15,842); Hartford, Connecticut |
| 2/8/1997; WTNH | | at Notre Dame | L 65–71 ^{OT} | 12–9 (5–7) | Edmund P. Joyce Center (10,196); Notre Dame, Indiana |
| 2/12/1997; ESPN | | at Boston College | W 61–56 | 13–9 (6–7) | Conte Forum (8,134); Boston |
| 2/15/1997; WTNH | | Miami | W 72–52 | 14–9 (7–7) | Harry A. Gampel Pavilion (10,027); Storrs, Connecticut |
| 2/17/1997; ESPN | | at Syracuse; Rivalry | L 66–71 ^{OT} | 14–10 (7–8) | Carrier Dome (22,950); Syracuse, New York |
| 2/23/1997; CBS | | at No. 19 Villanova | L 58–65 | 14–11 (7–9) | CoreStates Center (17,263); Philadelphia |
| 2/25/1997; ESPN2 | | Pittsburgh | L 74–77 | 14–12 (7–10) | Hartford Civic Center (15,746); Hartford, Connecticut |
| 3/1/1997; WTNH | | Seton Hall | L 60–73 | 14–13 (7–11) | Hartford Civic Center (16,186); Hartford, Connecticut |
Big East tournament
| 3/5/1997; ESPN | | vs. Pittsburgh; First round | L 62–63 | 14–14 | Madison Square Garden (18,291); New York City |
NIT
| 3/12/1997* | | Iona; First round | W 71–66 | 15–14 | Harry A. Gampel Pavilion (6,029); Storrs, Connecticut |
| 3/18/1997*; CPTV | | Bradley; Second round | W 63–47 | 16–14 | Harry A. Gampel Pavilion (8,338); Storrs, Connecticut |
| 3/21/1997*; CPTV | | Nebraska; Quarterfinals | W 76–67 | 17–14 | Harry A. Gampel Pavilion (8,411); Storrs, Connecticut |
| 3/25/1997*; ESPN | | vs. Florida State; Semifinals | L 66–71 | 17–15 | Madison Square Garden (13,841); New York |
| 3/27/1997* | | vs. Arkansas; Third-place game | W 74–64 | 18–15 | Madison Square Garden (15,849); New York |
*Non-conference game. ^{#}Rankings from AP Poll. (#) Tournament seedings in parentheses. All times are in Eastern Time.

Schedule Source:
