= 1996–97 Villanova Wildcats men's basketball team =

American college basketball season

1996–97 Villanova Wildcats men's basketball

Big East Regular Season co-champions

NCAA tournament, Round of 32
- Conference: Big East Conference

Ranking
- AP: No. 20
- Record: 24–10 (12–6 Big East)
- Head coach: Steve Lappas (5th season)
- Home arena: CoreStates Center (Capacity: 6,500)

1996–97 Big East men's basketball standings
| | Conf. | | | | Overall |
| Team | W | | L | PCT | W | | L | PCT |
|---|---|---|---|---|---|---|---|---|
Big East 6
| No. 20 Villanova | 12 | – | 6 | .667 | 24 | – | 10 | .706 |
| No. 23 Boston College† | 12 | – | 6 | .667 | 22 | – | 9 | .710 |
| West Virginia | 11 | – | 7 | .611 | 21 | – | 10 | .677 |
| Notre Dame | 8 | – | 10 | .444 | 16 | – | 14 | .533 |
| St. John's | 8 | – | 10 | .444 | 13 | – | 15 | .464 |
| Connecticut | 7 | – | 11 | .389 | 18 | – | 15 | .545 |
Big East 7
| Georgetown | 11 | – | 7 | .611 | 20 | – | 10 | .667 |
| Providence | 10 | – | 8 | .556 | 24 | – | 12 | .667 |
| Pittsburgh | 10 | – | 8 | .556 | 18 | – | 15 | .545 |
| Miami | 9 | – | 9 | .500 | 16 | – | 13 | .552 |
| Syracuse | 9 | – | 9 | .500 | 19 | – | 13 | .594 |
| Seton Hall | 5 | – | 13 | .278 | 10 | – | 18 | .357 |
| Rutgers | 5 | – | 13 | .278 | 11 | – | 16 | .407 |
† 1997 Big East tournament winner As of March 31, 1997; Rankings from AP poll

The 1996–97 Villanova Wildcats men's basketball team represented Villanova University in the 1996–97 season. With an overall record 24–10 and conference record of 12–6, the Wildcats placed first in the Big East Conference, and after reaching the finals of the Big East tournament, the team was invited to the NCAA tournament as a 3 seed.

== Roster ==
1996–97 Villanova Wildcats men's basketball team
Players
Coaches

| Pos. | # | Name | Height | Weight | Year | Hometown |
|---|---|---|---|---|---|---|
| F | 3 | Tim Thomas | 6 ft 10 in (2.08 m) | 230 lb (104 kg) | Fr | Paterson, New Jersey |
| G | 13 | John Celestand | 6 ft 4 in (1.93 m) | 175 lb (79 kg) | So | Piscataway, New Jersey |
| C | 15 | Malik Allen | 6 ft 10 in (2.08 m) | 245 lb (111 kg) | Fr | Medford, New Jersey |
| G | 20 | Alvin Williams | 6 ft 5 in (1.96 m) | 180 lb (82 kg) | Sr | Philadelphia, Pennsylvania |
| C | 42 | Jason Lawson | 6 ft 11 in (2.11 m) | 240 lb (109 kg) | Sr | Philadelphia, Pennsylvania |

Head coach

- Steve Lappas

Assistant coach(es)

Legend

- (C) Team captain
- (S) Suspended
- (I) Ineligible
- (W) Walk-on
- Injured
- Current redshirt

== Schedule and results ==
| Date time, TV | Rank^{#} | Opponent^{#} | Result | Record | Site city, state |
Regular season
| November 29* | | at American-Puerto Rico | W 68–62 | 1–0 | Eugene Guerra Sports Complex; San Juan, Puerto Rico |
| November 30* | | vs. Butler | W 62–54 | 2–0 | Eugene Guerra Sports Complex; San Juan, Puerto Rico |
| December 1* | | vs. Tulane | W 85–70 | 3–0 | Eugene Guerra Sports Complex; San Juan, Puerto Rico |
| December 4 | | Providence | W 75–64 | 4–0 (1–0) | CoreStates Center; Philadelphia, Pennsylvania |
| December 7 | | at St. John's | W 82–70 | 5–0 (2–0) | Madison Square Garden; New York City, New York |
| December 10* | | at Pennsylvania | W 82–62 | 6–0 (2–0) | The Palestra; Philadelphia, Pennsylvania |
| December 14* | | Duke | L 79–87 | 6–1 (2–0) | CoreStates Center; Philadelphia, Pennsylvania |
| December 21* | | Mount St. Mary's | W 91–66 | 7–1 (2–0) | CoreStates Center; Philadelphia, Pennsylvania |
| December 23* | | at Saint Joseph's | W 81–65 | 8–1 (2–0) | Hagan Arena; Philadelphia, Pennsylvania |
| December 28* | | Rider | W 75–61 | 9–1 (2–0) | CoreStates Center; Philadelphia, Pennsylvania |
| December 30* | | North Carolina-Wilmington | W 87–38 | 10–1 (2–0) | CoreStates Center; Philadelphia, Pennsylvania |
| January 2 | | Seton Hall | W 88–67 | 11–1 (3–0) | CoreStates Center; Philadelphia, Pennsylvania |
| January 6 | | at Providence | L 68–91 | 11–2 (3–1) | Dunkin' Donuts Center; Providence, RI |
| January 8* | | Oral Roberts | W 64–46 | 12–2 (3–1) | CoreStates Center; Philadelphia, Pennsylvania |
| January 11 | | Miami | L 59–61 | 12–3 (3–2) | CoreStates Center; Philadelphia, Pennsylvania |
| January 14 | | at Notre Dame | W 68–57 | 13–3 (4–2) | Joyce Center; South Bend, IN |
| January 18 | | Rutgers | W 79–56 | 14–3 (5–2) | CoreStates Center; Philadelphia, Pennsylvania |
| January 20 | | Syracuse | L 60–62 | 14–4 (5–3) | CoreStates Center; Philadelphia, Pennsylvania |
| January 25 | | at Boston College | W 84–66 | 15–4 (6–3) | Silvio O. Conte Forum; Boston, Massachusetts |
| January 27 | | at Georgetown | L 67–78 | 15–5 (6–4) | Capital Centre; Landover, Maryland |
| February 1 | | at Syracuse | W 70–60 | 16–5 (7–4) | Carrier Dome; Syracuse, NY |
| February 4 | | West Virginia | W 81–70 | 17–5 (8–4) | The Pavilion; Delaware County, Pennsylvania |
| February 9* | | at No. 3 Kentucky | L 56–93 | 17–6 (8–4) | Rupp Arena; Lexington, Kentucky |
| February 12 | | at Pittsburgh | L 89–95 | 17–7 (8–5) | Fitzgerald Field House; Pittsburgh, Pennsylvania |
| February 16 | | Notre Dame | W 75–70 | 18–7 (9–5) | CoreStates Center; Philadelphia, Pennsylvania |
| February 19 | | St. John's | W 65–54 | 19–7 (10–5) | CoreStates Center; Philadelphia, Pennsylvania |
| February 23 | | Connecticut | W 65–58 | 20–7 (11–5) | CoreStates Center; Philadelphia, Pennsylvania |
| February 26 | | at West Virginia | L 76–83 | 20–8 (11–6) | WVU Coliseum; Morgantown, WV |
| March 1 | | at Rutgers | W 84–74 | 21–8 (12–6) | Louis Brown Athletic Center; Piscataway, NJ |
Big East tournament
| March 6 | | vs. Syracuse; Quarterfinals | W 80–70 | 22–8 (13–6) | Madison Square Garden; New York City, New York |
| March 7 | | vs. Providence; Semifinals | W 73–63 | 23–8 (14–6) | Madison Square Garden; New York City, New York |
| March 8 | | vs. Boston College; Championship | L 58–70 | 23–9 (14–7) | Madison Square Garden; New York City, New York |
NCAA tournament
| March 13* | | vs. Long Island; First round | W 101–91 | 24–9 (14–7) | Lawrence Joel Veterans Memorial Coliseum; Winston-Salem, NC |
| March 15* | | vs. California; Second round | L 68–75 | 24–10 (14–7) | Lawrence Joel Veterans Memorial Coliseum; Winston-Salem, NC |
*Non-conference game. ^{#}Rankings from AP poll. (#) Tournament seedings in parentheses.

== Team players in the 1997 NBA draft ==
| Round | Pick | Player | NBA club |
|---|---|---|---|
| 1 | 7 | Tim Thomas | New Jersey Nets |
