= 1996–97 Pittsburgh Panthers men's basketball team =

American college basketball season

1996–97 Pittsburgh Panthers men's basketball

NIT, Second Round, L 71–76 vs. Arkansas
- Conference: Big East Conference (1979–2013)
- Record: 18–15 (10–8 Big East)
- Head coach: Ralph Willard (3rd season)
- Assistant coaches: Bobby Jones (3rd season); Jim Christian (1st season); Troy Weaver (1st season)
- Home arena: Fitzgerald Field House (Capacity: 4,122)

1996–97 Big East men's basketball standings
	Conf.				Overall
Team	W		L	PCT	W		L	PCT
Big East 6
No. 20 Villanova	12	–	6	.667	24	–	10	.706
No. 23 Boston College†	12	–	6	.667	22	–	9	.710
West Virginia	11	–	7	.611	21	–	10	.677
Notre Dame	8	–	10	.444	16	–	14	.533
St. John's	8	–	10	.444	13	–	15	.464
Connecticut	7	–	11	.389	18	–	15	.545
Big East 7
Georgetown	11	–	7	.611	20	–	10	.667
Providence	10	–	8	.556	24	–	12	.667
Pittsburgh	10	–	8	.556	18	–	15	.545
Miami	9	–	9	.500	16	–	13	.552
Syracuse	9	–	9	.500	19	–	13	.594
Seton Hall	5	–	13	.278	10	–	18	.357
Rutgers	5	–	13	.278	11	–	16	.407
† 1997 Big East tournament winner As of March 31, 1997; Rankings from AP poll

The 1996–97 Pittsburgh Panthers men's basketball team represented the University of Pittsburgh in the 1996–97 NCAA Division I men's basketball season. Led by head coach Ralph Willard, the Panthers finished with a record of 18–15. They were invited to the 1997 National Invitation Tournament where they lost in the second round to Arkansas.
