= 1996–97 Providence Friars men's basketball team =

American college basketball season

1996–97 Providence Friars men's basketball

NCAA tournament, Elite Eight
- Conference: Big East Conference

Ranking
- Coaches: No. 15
- Record: 24–12 (10–8 Big East)
- Head coach: Pete Gillen (3rd season)
- Assistant coach: Tom Herrion (3rd season)
- Home arena: Providence Civic Center

1996–97 Big East men's basketball standings
	Conf.				Overall
Team	W		L	PCT	W		L	PCT
Big East 6
No. 20 Villanova	12	–	6	.667	24	–	10	.706
No. 23 Boston College†	12	–	6	.667	22	–	9	.710
West Virginia	11	–	7	.611	21	–	10	.677
Notre Dame	8	–	10	.444	16	–	14	.533
St. John's	8	–	10	.444	13	–	15	.464
Connecticut	7	–	11	.389	18	–	15	.545
Big East 7
Georgetown	11	–	7	.611	20	–	10	.667
Providence	10	–	8	.556	24	–	12	.667
Pittsburgh	10	–	8	.556	18	–	15	.545
Miami	9	–	9	.500	16	–	13	.552
Syracuse	9	–	9	.500	19	–	13	.594
Seton Hall	5	–	13	.278	10	–	18	.357
Rutgers	5	–	13	.278	11	–	16	.407
† 1997 Big East tournament winner As of March 31, 1997; Rankings from AP poll

The 1996–97 Providence Friars men's basketball team represented Providence College during the 1996–97 NCAA Division I men's basketball season. Led by head coach Pete Gillen, the Friars finished the season 24–12 (10–8 Big East) and received an at-large bid to the NCAA tournament as the 10 seed in the Southeast region. The team made a run to the Elite Eight before losing to eventual National champion Arizona, 96–92 in OT.

== Roster ==
1996–97 Providence Friars men's basketball team
Players
Coaches

Pos.	#	Name	Height	Weight	Year	Hometown
G	3	Jason Murdock	6 ft 3 in (1.91 m)	187 lb (85 kg)	Sr	Bridgewater, New Jersey
F	4	Kofi Pointer	6 ft 8 in (2.03 m)	215 lb (98 kg)	Fr	Baltimore, Maryland
G	10	Corey Wright	5 ft 8 in (1.73 m)	160 lb (73 kg)	So	New York, New York
G	12	God Shammgod	6 ft 0 in (1.83 m)	169 lb (77 kg)	So	New York, New York
G	20	Dennis Cleary	6 ft 0 in (1.83 m)	160 lb (73 kg)	So	West Orange, New Jersey
C	24	Rubén Garcés	6 ft 9 in (2.06 m)	245 lb (111 kg)	Sr	Colón, Panama
G	25	Mark Adams	6 ft 3 in (1.91 m)	200 lb (91 kg)	Jr	Clifton, New Jersey
F	32	Derrick Brown	6 ft 6 in (1.98 m)	210 lb (95 kg)	Sr	Brooklyn, New York
F	33	Jamel Thomas	6 ft 6 in (1.98 m)	200 lb (91 kg)	So	Brooklyn, New York
C	34	Ndongo N'Diaye	7 ft 1 in (2.16 m)	215 lb (98 kg)	Fr	Dakar, Senegal
PF	44	Austin Croshere	6 ft 10 in (2.08 m)	225 lb (102 kg)	Sr	Los Angeles, California
F	50	Richard Cordella	6 ft 4 in (1.93 m)	205 lb (93 kg)	So	Foxboro, Massachusetts

Head coach

- Pete Gillen (Fairfield)

Assistant coach(es)

- Tom Herrion (Merrimack)

Legend

- (C) Team captain
- (S) Suspended
- (I) Ineligible
- (W) Walk-on
- Injured
- Current redshirt

Roster

== Schedule and results ==
Date time, TV	Rank^{#}	Opponent^{#}	Result	Record	Site city, state
Regular season
Nov 22, 1996		at Alaska-Fairbanks; Top of the World Classic	W 98–73	1–0	Carlson Center (4,920); Fairbanks, Alaska
Nov 23, 1996*		vs. Middle Tennessee; Top of the World Classic	L 75–77	1–1	Carlson Center (3,412); Fairbanks, Alaska
Nov 24, 1996*		vs. Southern Illinois; Top of the World Classic	W 82–58	2–1	Carlson Center (3,000); Fairbanks, Alaska
Nov 27, 1996*		LIU Brooklyn	W 100–88	3–1	Providence Civic Center; Providence, Rhode Island
Nov 30, 1996*		Columbia	W 74–61	4–1	Providence Civic Center; Providence, Rhode Island
Dec 4, 1996		at No. 5 Villanova	L 64–75	4–2 (0–1)	CoreStates Center; Philadelphia, Pennsylvania
Dec 7, 1996		Notre Dame	W 82–59	5–2 (1–1)	Providence Civic Center; Providence, Rhode Island
Dec 10, 1996*		Rhode Island	L 79–96	5–3	Providence Civic Center; Providence, Rhode Island
Dec 21, 1996*		Brown	W 58–44	6–3	Providence Civic Center; Providence, Rhode Island
Dec 23, 1996*		at Wisconsin	W 59–57	7–3	Wisconsin Field House; Madison, Wisconsin
Dec 28, 1996*		at Loyola Marymount	W 83–76	8–3	Gersten Pavilion; Los Angeles, California
Dec 31, 1996*		No. 18 Texas	W 74–66	9–3	Providence Civic Center; Providence, Rhode Island
Jan 2, 1997		St. John's	W 77–67	10–3 (2–1)	Providence Civic Center; Providence, Rhode Island
Jan 6, 1997		No. 8 Villanova	W 91–68	11–3 (3–1)	Providence Civic Center; Providence, Rhode Island
Jan 11, 1997		at Seton Hall	L 66–73	11–4 (3–2)	Continental Airlines Arena; East Rutherford, New Jersey
Jan 15, 1997		at Miami (FL)	L 69–71	11–5 (3–3)	Miami Arena; Miami, Florida
Jan 19, 1997		West Virginia	W 74–61	12–5 (4–3)	Providence Civic Center; Providence, Rhode Island
Jan 25, 1997		at St. John's	W 72–59	13–5 (5–3)	Madison Square Garden; New York, New York
Jan 27, 1997*		Canisius	W 80–53	14–5	Providence Civic Center; Providence, Rhode Island
Jan 29, 1997		at Connecticut	W 62–47	15–5 (6–3)	Harry A. Gampel Pavilion; Storrs, Connecticut
Feb 1, 1997		Boston College	W 83–71	16–5 (7–3)	Providence Civic Center; Providence, Rhode Island
Feb 5, 1997		Rutgers	W 73–67	17–5 (8–3)	Providence Civic Center; Providence, Rhode Island
Feb 8, 1997		at West Virginia	L 78–90 ^{OT}	17–6 (8–4)	WVU Coliseum; Morgantown, West Virginia
Feb 12, 1997		at Georgetown	L 69–75	17–7 (8–5)	Capital Centre; Washington, D.C.
Feb 15, 1997		Pittsburgh	W 84–70	18–7 (9–5)	Providence Civic Center; Providence, Rhode Island
Feb 18, 1997		at Rutgers	W 79–74	19–7 (10–5)	Louis Brown Athletic Center; Piscataway, New Jersey
Feb 22, 1997		at Notre Dame	L 74–86 ^{OT}	19–8 (10–6)	Joyce Center; Notre Dame, Indiana
Feb 24, 1997		Syracuse	L 82–91 ^{OT}	19–9 (10–7)	Providence Civic Center; Providence, Rhode Island
Mar 2, 1997		Georgetown	L 56–67	19–10 (10–8)	Providence Civic Center; Providence, Rhode Island
Big East Tournament
Mar 5, 1997*	(4)	vs. (13) Rutgers; First round	W 77–56	20–10	Madison Square Garden; New York, New York
Mar 6, 1997*	(4)	vs. (5) West Virginia; Quarterfinals	W 76–69	21–10	Madison Square Garden; New York, New York
Mar 7, 1997*	(4)	vs. (1) No. 21 Villanova; Semifinals	L 63–73	21–11	Madison Square Garden; New York, New York
NCAA Tournament
Mar 14, 1997*; CBS	(10 SE)	vs. (7 SE) Marquette; First round	W 81–59	22–11	Charlotte Coliseum; Charlotte, North Carolina
Mar 16, 1997*; CBS	(10 SE)	vs. (2 SE) No. 8 Duke; Second Round	W 98–87	23–11	Charlotte Coliseum; Charlotte, North Carolina
Mar 21, 1997*; CBS	(10 SE)	vs. (14 SE) Chattanooga; Southeast Regional semifinal – Sweet Sixteen	W 71–65	24–11	Birmingham-Jefferson Civic Center; Birmingham, Alabama
Mar 23, 1997*; CBS	(10 SE)	vs. (4 SE) No. 15 Arizona; Southeast Regional final – Elite Eight	L 92–96 ^{OT}	24–12	Birmingham-Jefferson Civic Center; Birmingham, Alabama
*Non-conference game. ^{#}Rankings from AP Poll. (#) Tournament seedings in parentheses. SE=Southeast. All times are in Eastern Time.

== NBA draft ==
Round	Pick	Player	NBA club
1	12	Austin Croshere	Indiana Pacers
