= 1996–97 Miami Hurricanes men's basketball team =

American college basketball season

1996–97 Miami Hurricanes men's basketball

Orange Bowl Classic Champion

NIT, 1st round
- Conference: Big East Conference
- Record: 16-13 (9-9 Big East)
- Head coach: Leonard Hamilton
- Home arena: Miami Arena

1996–97 Big East men's basketball standings
	Conf.				Overall
Team	W		L	PCT	W		L	PCT
Big East 6
No. 20 Villanova	12	–	6	.667	24	–	10	.706
No. 23 Boston College†	12	–	6	.667	22	–	9	.710
West Virginia	11	–	7	.611	21	–	10	.677
Notre Dame	8	–	10	.444	16	–	14	.533
St. John's	8	–	10	.444	13	–	15	.464
Connecticut	7	–	11	.389	18	–	15	.545
Big East 7
Georgetown	11	–	7	.611	20	–	10	.667
Providence	10	–	8	.556	24	–	12	.667
Pittsburgh	10	–	8	.556	18	–	15	.545
Miami	9	–	9	.500	16	–	13	.552
Syracuse	9	–	9	.500	19	–	13	.594
Seton Hall	5	–	13	.278	10	–	18	.357
Rutgers	5	–	13	.278	11	–	16	.407
† 1997 Big East tournament winner As of March 31, 1997; Rankings from AP poll

The 1996–97 Miami Hurricanes men's basketball team represented the University of Miami during the 1996–97 NCAA Division I men's basketball season. The Hurricanes, led by head coach Leonard Hamilton, played their home games at the Miami Arena and were members of the Big East Conference.

On December 28, 1996, Miami defeated DePaul 61–45 in the Orange Bowl Basketball Classic at Miami Arena.

Miami finished the season with a 16–13 record. They were eliminated in the 2nd round of the Big East tournament by Georgetown 63–59. Their season ended on March 13, 1997, with a 76–63 loss to Michigan in the 1997 NIT 1st round.
