= Boston College Eagles men's basketball =

2026–27 Boston College Eagles men's basketball team
- College: Boston College
- First season: 1904–05; 122 years ago
- Athletic director: Blake James
- Head coach: Luke Murray; 1st season, 5–0 (1.000)
- Location: Chestnut Hill, Massachusetts
- Arena: Conte Forum (capacity: 8,606)
- NCAA division: Division I
- Conference: ACC
- Nickname: Eagles
- Colors: Maroon and gold
- Student section: SuperFans
- All-time record: 1237–1066 (.537)
- NCAA tournament record: 22–19 (.537)

NCAA Division I tournament Elite Eight
- 1967, 1982, 1994
Other NCAA Division I tournament results
Sweet Sixteen	1967, 1975, 1981, 1982, 1983, 1985, 1994, 2006
Appearances	1958, 1967, 1968, 1975, 1981, 1982, 1983, 1985, 1994, 1996, 1997, 2001, 2002, 2004, 2005, 2006, 2007, 2009

Conference tournament champions
- ECAC: 1975 Big East: 1997, 2001

Conference regular-season champions
- Big East: 1981, 1983, 2001, 2005

Conference division champions
- Big East 6: 1997 Big East East: 2001, 2003

Uniforms
Home	Away	Alternate

The Boston College Eagles men's basketball program represents Boston College in NCAA Division I men's intercollegiate basketball. The team has competed in the Atlantic Coast Conference (ACC) since 2005, having previously played in the Big East. The Eagles have appeared in 18 NCAA Tournaments in their history, most recently in 2009. Home games have been played at the Conte Forum since 1988. The current head coach of the program is Luke Murray.

== History ==
The Boston College men's college basketball team, c. 1900

In 1904, the first men's varsity team was sanctioned at Boston College, and was coached by James Crowley. On December 26 of that year, BC played its first-ever game, losing 8–6 to Battery H of Navy. The team earned its first win that season against Tufts, 23–17, in Medford. Basketball, not a popular sport at the turn of the 20th century, suffered through years of weak fan support and lasted three initial seasons before being abandoned. A brief revival in the early 1920s brought the men's team back before being dropped again following the 1924–25 season. Finally, following World War II when the sport began to gain popularity in the United States, the basketball team became a permanent part of the Boston College athletics program for the 1945–46 season. Through 2021–22, there have been 84 seasons of BC basketball.

In 1963, BC hired Boston Celtics legend Bob Cousy as head coach and earned postseason berths in five of his six years in the role, including a trip to the Elite Eight in 1967. Boston College has hired several other notable coaches through the years, including Chuck Daly, Tom Davis, Gary Williams and former Eagle Jim O'Brien ('71).

During one of the darkest periods in BC history, several members of the 1978–79 basketball team were accused of being involved in a point-shaving scandal that drew national attention due to the involvement of the infamous Mafia associate Henry Hill. One player, Rick Kuhn, was found guilty and served time in jail for his efforts in the fix.

Before the 1979–80 season, Boston College basketball became a charter member of the Big East Conference. With increased national exposure and better competition—leading to improved and more expansive recruiting—BC ensured itself of an opportunity to compete at the highest level of NCAA Division I basketball each year.

From the time the seven original Northeastern schools formed the Big East, the BC men's basketball team achieved several high points: Advancing to the Elite Eight in the 1982 NCAA tournament; winning the Big East tournament in 1997 and 2001; four Big East Coach of the Year awards; three Big East Player of the Year awards and a memorable win over No. 1-ranked North Carolina in the 1994 NCAA tourney. Boston College left the Big East in all sports and joined the Atlantic Coast Conference after the 2004–05 season.

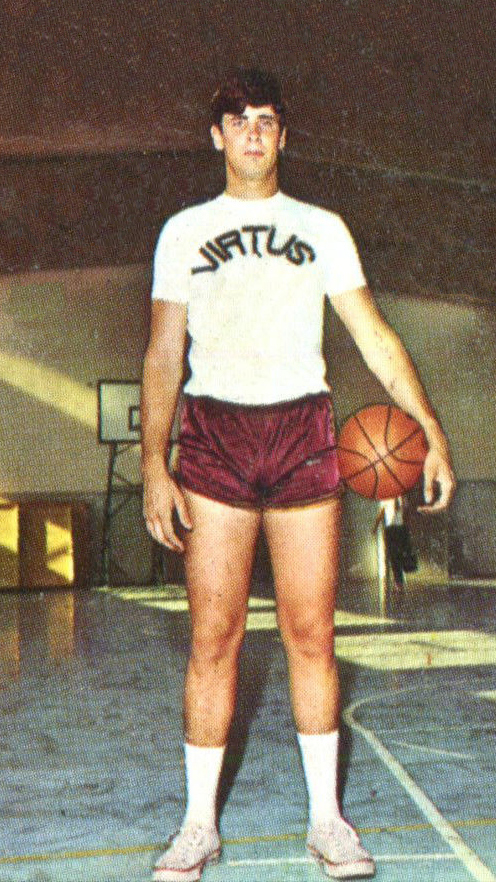
Terry Driscoll was named MVP of the 1969 NIT

Among Boston College's biggest non-conference rivals in basketball is the University of Massachusetts. First played in 1905 and held annually since 1995, BC's basketball rivalry with UMass is called the "Commonwealth Classic" and was played on several occasions at what is now known as TD Garden in the 1990s until BC ended the annual game in 2012. The Eagles are 22–17 against their cross-state rival. The Boston College men's basketball team has made 18 overall appearances in the NCAA tournament, including three trips to the Elite Eight. The team has played in the NIT 10 times. BC has produced four conference players of the year:

- John Bagley '83, was the Big East Player of the Year in 1980–1981.
- Troy Bell '03 was co-Big East Player of the Year in 2000–2001, and won the title outright in 2002–2003.
- Jared Dudley '07 was the ACC Player of the Year in 2006–07.

Additionally, the Eagles have had one conference rookie of the year, with Olivier Hanlan earning the ACC Rookie of the Year honor in the 2012–13 season.

Notable BC student-athletes who have gone on to careers in the NBA include: Michael Adams '85, John Bagley '83, Dana Barros '89, Troy Bell '03, Bill Curley '94, Howard Eisley '94, Jay Murphy '84, Gerry Ward '63, Sean Williams '07, Craig Smith '06, Jared Dudley '07, Reggie Jackson '11, Olivier Hanlan '16, and most recently Jerome Robinson '18 and Ky Bowman '19.

== 1986–1997: O'Brien returns to the Heights ==
On March 26, 1986, Jim O'Brien '71 returned to his alma mater as coach of the Boston College Eagles basketball team. Despite a bitter end to his tenure as head coach, O'Brien has been credited with resuscitating the BC basketball team, which—aside from some success in the early 1980s—had not been a consistent NCAA tournament contender since the 1960s. Although O'Brien built a solid program, his timing was excellent: Boston College opened its new hockey and basketball arena, Conte Forum, in 1988; the Big East reached its zenith with conference teams winning national championships in 1984 and 1985; and at the time, BC was still feeling the positive effects of the Flutie effect, leading to an increase in national exposure for Boston College athletics.

Boston College played its final season in the Roberts Center in the 1987–88 season and were invited to the NIT, advancing to the semi-finals before being knocked off by regional rival UConn, 73–67. BC returned to the NIT in 1992 and 1993. In 1989–90, Israeli Lior Arditti led the team with an .823 free throw percentage and a .456 three-point field goal percentage.

In 1994, the Eagles were defeated by Georgetown 81–58 in the first round of the Big East tournament. But, following its invitation to the NCAA, the men's basketball team went on one of its most historic runs. Boston College defeated Washington State in the opening round of the tournament. In the second round, BC produced an upset of defending national champion North Carolina, 75–72, pushing them to the Sweet Sixteen. After a victory over Bobby Knight and Indiana, the Eagles advanced back to the Elite Eight where they fell to Florida, 74–66.

In 1996, the Eagles returned to the tournament. BC finished the year at 19–11 and bowed out in the second round after losing to Georgia Tech by a score of 103–89.

Led by All-Big East forward Danya Abrams and sophomore point guard James "Scoonie" Penn, Boston College won the 1997 Big East tournament for the first time with victories over Pitt, Georgetown and Villanova. For its Big East tournament championship, BC received an automatic bid to the tournament and met Valparaiso. The Eagles knocked off its first-round opponent 73–66, but fell in the second round to St. Joseph's as the Hawks eked out an 81–77 win.

After the 1997 season, controversy erupted as Jim O'Brien and the Boston College administration sparred over academic standards in recruiting athletes. O'Brien filed a lawsuit against BC on the grounds of breach of contract and slander. The case was settled out of court. Following a bitter end to his tenure, the BC alumnus moved to Ohio State and brought his star play-maker Scoonie Penn with him. At Ohio State, O'Brien took the Buckeyes to the Final Four in 1999. O'Brien's tenure at Ohio State also ended on bitter terms with litigation by O'Brien against his former employer.

== 1997–2010: The Skinner era ==
=== Early growth and success ===
Following the departure of Jim O'Brien in 1997, former Rhode Island head coach and ABA star Al Skinner arrived in Chestnut Hill as BC's first new head coach in over a decade. Following three sub-.500 seasons, Skinner led the Eagles to a Big East-best 27–5 mark in 2000–01 (setting a then-school record for wins in a season), the school's second Big East tournament title and a No. 3 seed in the NCAA tournament. BC defeated Southern Utah in the opening round but was upset by USC 74–71 in the second round. Skinner received Big East Coach of the Year honors and star sophomore Troy Bell was named Big East Co-Player of the Year.

With Skinner building on these early achievements, Boston College saw increased success on the basketball court and garnered growing national media attention in the decade that followed. The team received seven bids to the NCAA tournament in a ten-year span from 2000 to 2010. The Eagles made inroads in the newly joined ACC as well, advancing to the finals of the league tournament in the school's first year of membership in 2005–06 before falling to Duke by two points. The team returned to the ACC semifinal round in 2007.

The Eagles defeated the defending national champions in three consecutive seasons from the 2003–04 through the 2005–06 season: Syracuse 57–54 (on 2004-03-11), UConn 75–70 (on 2005-01-05) and UNC 81–74 (on 2006-01-25 and 2006-03-11).

Skinner's success has been attributed to his ability to develop student-athletes not recruited by other major programs. Troy Bell, who won two Big East Player of the Year awards under Skinner, is seen as example, in addition to Jared Dudley, Sean Williams, Sean Marshall and All-American forward Craig Smith, a Los Angeles native who was overlooked by most Pac-10 schools.

=== Twenty straight to start: 2004–05 Season ===
Beginning the season unranked and with no votes in the coaches' poll, the 2004-05 Boston College Eagles accomplished something no Big East team had done before by starting a season 20–0. In the 20 straight victories, the Eagles beat two ranked opponents and, at the time of the 20–0 mark, were one of only two teams without a loss (Illinois was the other).

The team finally lost occurred against Notre Dame on February 8, 2005. Following the defeat, BC beat unranked Rutgers and then No. 9 Syracuse on February 19, vaulting them to No. 3 in both the AP and coaches' polls—the highest ranking for any Boston College basketball team. After finishing the regular season at 24–3, BC was knocked out of the Big East tournament in the second round by West Virginia, 78–72, after drawing a bye in the first round with the league's best record (13–3). Boston College received a No. 4 seed in the 2005 NCAA tournament and defeated the Penn Quakers in the opening round, 85–65. In the following matchup against Milwaukee, who had already upset Alabama, UWM pulled another upset with an 83–75, ending the Eagles' season.

=== Back to the Sweet Sixteen: 2005–06 Season ===
BC playing West Virginia at home in 2005.

In its debut ACC season, the Eagles recorded a school-record 28 wins, including 11 in conference. After reaching to the league tournament title game with victories over Maryland and North Carolina, the Eagles advanced to the Sweet Sixteen for the first time in 12 years and No. 7 in the final AP poll.

In May before the season began, a drug use incident involving center and BC single-season blocks leader Sean Williams led to his suspension for the first semester from the campus and the team. His playing status was in doubt until December. Although not allowed back to Chestnut Hill until the end of the first semester and contingent upon a court hearing, Williams took courses and worked out at the University of Houston in the fall. He was allowed to return after a Boston judge concluded he had fulfilled his commitment and the school gave its approval because Williams met his academic requirements. Sophomore forward Akida McLain was also suspended from the team for the first seven games of the season for an off-court incident.

Also prior to the season, senior forward Craig Smith was voted a first-team All-American, the first BC player to be so honored, and named to the All-ACC preseason team—before playing a game in the league. Boston College entered its first season in the ACC ranked No. 11 in both major polls and started 6–0, reaching as high as No. 6 on December 5. On December 11, McLain was reinstated and on December 22 Williams returned to the team against Harvard.

After starting ACC play with three straight losses, the Eagles rebounded with four consecutive league wins—winning its first ACC game against Florida State on January 14. On February 13, BC defeated Stony Brook to reach the 20-win mark for the fifth time in six years. On February 25, Skinner earned his 169th Boston College win when the Eagles downed NC State 74–72 in double overtime, making the former ABA star the winningest coach in BC history. The Eagles finished the 2005–06 regular season with a 24–6 (11–5) record and defeated Maryland in the second round of the ACC tournament 80–66, after receiving an opening bye. BC then edged No. 10 North Carolina 85–82 and advanced to the ACC Championship Game in its first year in the league. No. 3 Duke defeated BC 78–76 win in the final.

As a No. 4 seed in the NCAA tournament BC defeated Pacific 88–76 in double overtime. After trailing by six in the first overtime, the Eagles rallied and went on a 14–2 run in the second session to win the game. Against 12th-seeded Montana, Boston College won 69–56, advancing to the regional semifinals for the first time since 1994. In the Sweet Sixteen against Villanova, BC lost 60–59 in overtime. The Eagles led by as many as 14 points in the first half but the Wildcats captured their first lead with 2:18 remaining in the game when Randy Foye hit two free throws to go ahead 49–48. With 28 seconds left, Jared Dudley sank a 3-pointer to tie the score and send the game to overtime. In the extra session, a Craig Smith basket gave BC a 59–58 lead. (It was later learned that Smith played the entire overtime period with a broken hand.) With seconds remaining, Wildcat forward Will Sheridan slipped past his defender and scored the winning two points on a goaltending call against Sean Williams with 2.3 seconds left. Louis Hinnant's three pointer missed at the buzzer and BC was eliminated.

=== Later Skinner years: 2006–2010 ===
==== 2006–07 season ====
A senior-laden Boston College team enjoyed a winning 2006–2007 season but did not match the success of the year before. Jared Dudley led the Eagles to 4th in the ACC and a return to the ACC semifinal before losing to North Carolina. Boston College received a No. 7 seed in the NCAA tournament and defeated Texas Tech in the first round. The Eagles then faced Georgetown in the second round and were defeated. Following the season, Dudley and Marshall entered the NBA, leaving Tyrese Rice to lead the 2007–2008 Eagles.

==== 2007–08 season ====
The Eagles struggled in 2007–2008 going 14–17 and 4–12 in conference play. BC, however, got 3 highly regarded freshmen in Rakim Sanders, Josh Southern, and Corey Raji. Rice had many impressive performances such as his 48-point performance against North Carolina that ended up in a 90–80 loss. BC had trouble finishing off teams and going into 2008–2009 had 1 senior, 1 junior, and the rest freshmen and sophomores.

==== 2008–09 season ====
BC had a solid 8–2 start to the 2008–2009 season with the addition of Vermont transfer forward Joe Trapani. BC went 3–1 in the NIT tip-off, losing only to a tough Purdue team 71–64 and coming in 3rd in the whole tournament.

To start the 2008–09 ACC Season, the Eagles stunned the then-undefeated No. 1-ranked North Carolina Tar Heels in the Dean Dome 85–78, behind great play by Rice, Rakim Sanders, and freshman Reggie Jackson. Despite the enormity of the win and the national attention that came with it, the Eagles promptly lost at home to Harvard 82–70 in the following game. In all, they suffered 4 consecutive losses after the North Carolina victory including Miami, Wake Forest, and Virginia Tech. The slump ended with a win in overtime against Georgia Tech. BC then got 3 more key ACC wins against NC State, Maryland, and Virginia Tech. In the Virginia Tech game, BC won in exciting fashion via a put-back shot with less than a second remaining. That made BC 5–3 in the ACC and 17–6 overall. After a win at Virginia, the Eagles were just a half game out of first place in the conference. The Eagles went on a two-game losing streak, after losing halftime leads against No. 7 Wake Forest and No. 11 Clemson. In a home game on February 15 Boston College Defeated #6 Duke with a score of 80–74. Tyrese Rice scored 21 points, including his 2,000th career point at BC. It was the Eagles' first win over the Blue Devils in 24 years, and BC was the only team to beat both Duke and UNC that season. After the victory against Duke, the Eagles lost their next game to Miami (Fla.) for the second time in the same year. After this setback, BC went 2–1 down the stretch with home victories over No. 25 Florida State and a Rakim Sanders buzzer beater over Georgia Tech. They finished the regular season 21–10 and sixth in the ACC. In the first round of the conference tournament the Eagles beat Virginia 76–63 and moved on to play No. 8 Duke in the second round. BC lost to the Blue Devils 66–65 and were eliminated from the tournament. The Eagles finished the season 22–11 (9–7). Senior Tyrese Rice was named to the 2nd team All-ACC after being on the 1st team All-ACC the previous year.

BC received a No. 7 seed and a date with a USC team led by future first-round draft pick Taj Gibson on March 20, 2009. However, that was the last game Tyrese Rice ever played in a BC uniform. The Eagles led by 4 at the half, but ultimately lost 72–55. Although the team lost Rice to graduation, all other players would return for the 2009–10 season.

==== 2009–10 season ====
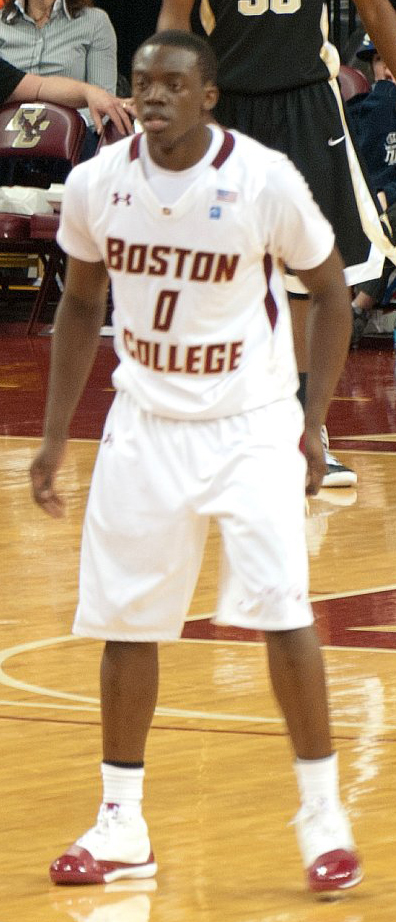
Reggie Jackson

The Eagles had a disappointing 2009–2010 season, finishing 15–16 (6–10 in the ACC). The team's most notable games were losses to struggling programs, including Maine, Saint Joseph's, and (for the second straight year) Harvard. They ended the season with a loss to Virginia in the ACC Tournament, bringing the Eagles' all-time record in the tournament to .500 (5–5).

On March 30, 2010, head coach Al Skinner was fired and soon replaced by former Cornell coach Steve Donahue, who had just completed guiding the Big Red to the Sweet Sixteen and the Ivy League's best performance in the tournament since 1979. With the loss of Skinner, Boston College junior forward Rakim Sanders decided to transfer, landing at Fairfield where former BC Assistant Ed Cooley was head coach. Recruits Brady Heslip and Kevin Noreen also asked to be released from their letters of intent and never matriculated at BC. The team's lone senior, Tyler Roche, graduated after the 2009–2010 season.

== 2010–2014: Donahue's tenure ==
=== 2010–11 season ===
In Steve Donahue's first season as head coach, the Eagles roster featured seven seniors but was led by star junior guard Reggie Jackson, who was named to the first team All-ACC. BC finished the regular season at 19–11, 9–7 in the ACC. That conference record earned them a 5-seed in the ACC tournament, where they beat 12-seeded Wake Forest. However, they lost a tough game to 4-seed Clemson. Boston College was one of multiple ACC teams on the NCAA tournament bubble. They received a 1 seed in the NIT. They won in the first round against McNeese State. However, they lost by double figures to 4-seed Northwestern. Their final record was 20–12. The season was highlighted by a marquee win over Texas A&M, and sweeps of Maryland and Virginia Tech. On the other hand, the team lost to Yale and Harvard at home; it was the third straight year that the Eagles lost to the Crimson, despite Harvard losing its star guard, Jeremy Lin, to graduation the previous year.

=== 2011–12 Season ===
Steve Donahue's second season was a rough one. BC lost star Reggie Jackson to the NBA draft, and also lost key players Biko Paris, Corey Raji, Joe Trapani, and Josh Southern to graduation. They also lost reserve Dallas Elmore to transfer. The only player with major experience, Matt Humphrey, was a transfer from the University of Oregon. With a roster featuring 9 freshman, the Eagles were picked last in the ACC. Early on, guard Patrick Heckmann carried the team through their first games of the season, but mono and injury issues caused a significant drop in production for Heckmann. The team struggled mightily early on, going 5–10 in non-conference and getting blown out against teams like UMass and Holy Cross. In the Eagles' first ACC game at North Carolina they kept things close, cutting the UNC lead to 9 late in the second half. Momentum from that performance carried over when they won two straight ACC games at home, against Clemson and Virginia Tech. However, the Eagles lost their next 6 games. BC struggled the rest of the season as well, but did show flashes of the future in stunning No. 15 Florida State and beating Georgia Tech, as well. Their season ended in a loss in the ACC Tournament to NC State. BC finished 9–22, 4–12 in the ACC. The Eagles were paced by freshman Ryan Anderson, who averaged 11.8 PPG and 7.4 RPG on his way to making the All-ACC Freshman team.

=== 2012–13 Season ===
In Steve Donahue's 3rd season, the underclassmen-heavy Eagles finished 16–17 (8–10). The team was led by freshman guard Olivier Hanlan (15.4 PPG) and sophomore forward Ryan Anderson (14.9 PPG). The Eagles were picked last for the second consecutive preseason poll but finished 8th in ACC play. In the non-conference the Eagles finished 8–5, including losses to Charleston, Bryant, and Harvard. However, the Eagles defeated major conference opponents Auburn and Providence. The Eagles began ACC play with a 1–6 record and several narrow defeats. BC lost 60–59 to eventual ACC champion Miami (FL) and lost 78–73 to No. 23 NC State. However, the Eagles improved in the second half of conference play, going 6–5 to end the year. During those games, BC narrowly lost to No. 4 Duke, 62–61. After beating Georgia Tech in the regular season finale, the Eagles again topped the Yellow Jackets 84–64 in the ACC Tournament's opening round. In the game, Hanlan scored a freshman record 41 points. In the second round, the Eagles' season ended with a loss to No. 9 Miami (FL), 69–58. Olivier Hanlan was named ACC freshman of the year.

=== 2013–14 Season ===
After a lackluster 8–24 season (4–14 ACC) and despite an upset victory over then–undefeated No. 1 Syracuse, coach Steve Donahue was fired as Boston College head coach on March 18, 2014. Jim Christian, formerly head coach of the Ohio Bobcats was hired to fill the vacancy.

== 2014–2021: Jim Christian era ==
=== 2014–15 Season ===
In Jim Christian's first season at the helm, the Eagles finished with a 13–19 record, 4–14 in ACC play. After a second round exit from the ACC tournament, star point guard Olivier Hanlan declared for the 2015 NBA draft as a junior. He was selected 42nd overall in the 2nd round by the Utah Jazz.

=== 2015–16 Season ===
Jim Christian's second season as head coach saw the Eagles fall on hard times, finishing with an overall record of 7–25, and 0–18 in ACC play. This marked the first time a team did not win a single in-conference game in ACC basketball history, and complimented the football team's 0–8 record in ACC play.

=== 2016–17 Season ===
The Eagles righted their course slightly after the '15–'16 season, as they finished the season with a 2–16 record in ACC play and 9–23 overall record. The '16–'17 season was highlighted by play from stand-out freshman Ky Bowman.

=== 2017–18 Season ===
Boston College continued their upward trend in the '17–'18 season, finishing 7–11 in ACC play and with an overall record of 19–16. This was their first winning basketball record since the 2010–2011 season. During the '17–'18 season Eagles beat No. 1 Duke Blue Devils at home on December 9, 2017, to open ACC play. Before this, their last win over Duke was in the 2008–09 season, beating them 80–74 at home. The Eagles also gave the eventual No. 1 Virginia a scare on the road, yet missed the final shot of the game to fall 58–59. In the ACC tournament, Boston College won two games, first beating Georgia Tech, and then upsetting 5th ranked NC State before falling to No. 4 Clemson in the quarterfinals. Junior forward Jerome Robinson had a career year, averaging 20.8 points, good for second in the ACC behind Duke's Marvin Bagley III. Robinson finished second in voting for ACC player of the year, also behind Bagley III, and was eventually named an All-American Honorable Mention. After the season ended, Jerome Robinson declared for the 2018 NBA draft, and was selected 13th overall by the Los Angeles Clippers.

=== 2020–21 Season ===
On February 15, 2021, Boston College announced that it had fired head coach Jim Christian, effective immediately. The Eagles were 3–13 on the season at that time. Boston College announced that assistant coach Scott Spinelli would take over as interim head coach for the remainder of the season. The Eagles finished the season 4–16.

== 2021–2026: Earl Grant era ==
=== 2021–22 Season ===
On March 15, 2021, Boston College officially hired Earl Grant, formerly head coach at the College of Charleston, to replace interim head coach Scott Spinelli. As a result of the staffing change and the loss of scoring leaders Jay Heath and CJ Felder to the transfer portal, Boston College was picked last in the ACC preseason poll. After starting the season with a 5–3 record, the Eagles defeated Notre Dame 73–57 at home in their ACC opener, with James Karnik scoring a team high 17 points and 13 rebounds. Following a five-game losing streak, Boston College completed a 23-point comeback victory against the Clemson Tigers, led by a second half performance from Makai Ashton-Langford, who scored 17 of his 19 points after the intermission. The Eagles ended the regular-season ranked 13th in the ACC with a conference record of 6–14. After beating No. 12 Pitt in the first round of the ACC tournament, the Eagles upset No. 5 Wake Forest in an 82–77 overtime victory, making it only the second time a team ranked 13th had reached the quarterfinals in the ACC tournament and the first time that the Eagles had won two games in the tournament since the 2018 season. The Eagles then lost to No. 4 Miami in a back-and-forth game that ended with a last-second lay-up to give Miami a 71–69 lead in overtime. Boston College ended the season with an overall record of 13–20.

=== 2022-23 Season ===
After a 13-20 season, and the losses of Former 4-star recruit Gianni Thompson and Bench Center Justin Vander Baan, the Eagles were placed 13th of 15 in the ACC Preseason Poll. After a 6-6 start, Boston College upset the No. 21 Virginia Tech Hokies 70-65 in overtime. Guard Makai Ashton-Langford lead the way with 21 points. Later in the season, the Eagles upset the No. 6 Virginia Cavaliers 63-48, which gave the Eagles high hopes before the ACC Tournament. The Eagles finished the season with a 15-16 record, while being 9-11 in ACC Conference play. The Eagles won the first game of the ACC Tournament against Louisville 80-62, but in the next round, lost to the North Carolina Tar Heels 85-61, ending their season. The Eagles did not make a postseason tournament, and finished the season 16-17.

=== 2023-24 season ===
The Eagles were placed 12th of 15 in the ACC Preseason poll. After star center Quinten Post withdrew his name from the 2023 NBA Draft and the Eagles landed star transfer point guard Claudell Harris Jr. from Charleston Southern, hopes were high for the Eagles. The Eagles started the season 9-3, with big wins over Vanderbilt, St. John’s, and a 95-64 win over rival College of the Holy Cross, with center Quinten Post, guard Jaeden Zackery, and guard Claudell Harris Jr. leading the way. Although the Eagles start was very good, the Eagles only went 8-12 in conference play. But, they did go 17-14 overall. The Eagles did well in the ACC Tournament, with wins over Miami and a huge 76-55 win over Clemson, who went to the Elite Eight of March Madness. In the Quarterfinal, Eagles forward Mason Madsen hit a clutch mid-range shot to send them to overtime over the Virginia Cavaliers. The shot was reviewed to see if it was a 3-pointer, but was ultimately not called a three. The Eagles did not perform well in overtime, and lost 66-60. But, their 19-15 season got them into the NIT.

In the first game of the NIT, the Eagles faced off with the Providence Friars at the Amica Mutual Pavillion in Providence. The Eagles played a good game, and won their first game of the NIT 62-57, with guard Claudell Harris Jr. leading the way with 17 points, and a good performance from center Quinten Post. This win pushed them to the second round of the NIT, at UNLV. But, the Eagles lost in Vegas, ending their season. Quinten Post led the team with 22 points and a stellar performance, ending his collegiate career with a good game. The Eagles finished 20-16, while being 8-12 in ACC play, and made the Second Round of the NIT. During the offseason, center Quinten Post was drafted 52nd overall of the second round in the NBA Draft to the Golden State Warriors. He was involved in a wacky trade with the Thunder and Trail Blazers, which eventually led to him landing back in Golden State.

== Postseason results ==
=== NCAA tournament results ===
The Eagles have appeared in the NCAA tournament 18 times. Their combined record is 22–19.

The NCAA began seeding the tournament with the 1979 edition.

Year	Seed	Round	Opponent	Result/Score
1958	-	Regional Quarterfinals	Maryland	L 63–86
1967	-	Regional Quarterfinals; Regional semifinals Regional Finals	Connecticut; St. John's; North Carolina	W 48–42; W 63–62; L 80–96
1968	-	Regional Quarterfinals	St. Bonaventure	L 93–102
1975	-	Regional Quarterfinals; Regional semifinals Regional 3rd-place game	Furman; Kansas State; North Carolina	W 82–76; L 65–74; L 90–110
1981	#5	First round Second Round; Sweet Sixteen	Ball State; Wake Forest; Saint Joseph's	W 93–90; W 67–64; L 41–42
1982	#8	First round Second Round; Sweet Sixteen; Elite Eight	San Francisco; DePaul; Kansas State; Houston	W 70–66; W 82–75; W 69–65; L 92–99
1983	#4	Second Round; Sweet Sixteen	Princeton; Virginia	W 51–43; L 92–95
1985	#11	First round Second Round; Sweet Sixteen	Texas Tech; Duke; Memphis	W 55–53; W 74–73; L 57–59
1994	#9	First round Second Round; Sweet Sixteen; Elite Eight	Washington State; North Carolina; Indiana; Florida	W 67–64; W 75–72; W 77–68; L 66–74
1996	#11	First round Second Round	Indiana; Georgia Tech	W 64–51; L 89–103
1997	#5	First round Second Round	Valparaiso; Saint Joseph's	W 73–66; L 77–81^{OT}
2001	#3	First round Second Round	Southern Utah; USC	W 68–65; L 71–74
2002	#11	First round	Texas	L 57–70
2004	#6	First round Second Round	Utah; Georgia Tech	W 58–51; L 54–57
2005	#4	First round Second Round	Penn; Milwaukee	W 85–65; L 75–83
2006	#4	First round Second Round; Sweet Sixteen	Pacific; Montana; Villanova	W 88–76^{2OT} W 69–56; L 59–60^{OT}
2007	#7	First round Second Round	Texas Tech; Georgetown	W 84–75; L 55–62
2009	#7	First round	USC	L 55–72

=== NIT results ===
The Eagles have appeared in the National Invitation Tournament (NIT) 13 times. Their combined record is 18–13.

Year	Round	Opponent	Result/Score
1965	First round	St. John's	L 92–114
1966	First round Quarterfinals	Louisville; Villanova	W 96–90; L 85–86
1969	First round Quarterfinals; Semifinals; Finals	Kansas; Louisville; Army; Temple	W 78–62; W 88–83; W 73–61; L 76–89
1974	First round Quarterfinals; Semifinals; 3rd-place game	Cincinnati; Connecticut; Utah; Jacksonville	W 63–62; W 76–75; L 93–113; W 87–77
1980	First round Second Round	Boston University; Virginia	W 95–74; L 55–57
1984	First round Second Round	St. Joseph's; Notre Dame	W 75–63; L 52–66
1988	First round Second Round; Quarterfinals; Semifinals; 3rd-place game	Siena; Evansville; Middle Tennessee; Connecticut; Colorado State	W 73–65; W 88–81; W 78–69; L 67–73; L 57–58
1992	First round Second Round	Southern Illinois; Rhode Island	W 78–69; L 80–81
1993	First round Second Round; Quarterfinals	Niagara; Rice; Providence	W 87–83; W 101–68; L 58–75
2003	Opening Round; First round	Fairfield; Temple	W 90–78; L 62–75
2011	First round Second Round	McNeese State; Northwestern	W 82–64; L 67–85
2018	First round	Western Kentucky	L 62–79
2024	First round Second Round	Providence; UNLV	W 62–57; L 70–79

== Awards ==
=== Retired jerseys ===
Note: Only the players' jerseys were retired, the numbers remain available for future players.

Player	Pos.	Tenure	Ref.
Troy Bell (Note: Wore #2.)	PG	1999–2003	
Bill Curley (Note: Wore #15.)	PF	1990–94	
Dana Barros (Note: Wore #3.)	PG	1985–89	
Michael Adams (Note: Wore #23.)	PG	1981–85	
John Silk (Note: Wore #25.)	SF	1950–53	
Gerry Ward (Note: Wore #40.)	G	1960–63	
Terry Driscoll (Note: Wore #51.)	SF	1966–69	
John Bagley (Note: Wore #54.)	PG	1979–82	

=== All-Americans ===
- 1963: Gerry Ward (Third Team)
- 1965: John Austin (Third Team)
- 1966: John Austin (Second Team)
- 1969: Terry Driscoll (Third Team)
- 1982: John Bagley (Third Team)
- 1994: Bill Curley (Third Team)
- 2001: Troy Bell (Second Team)
- 2003: Troy Bell (Second Team)
- 2005: Craig Smith (Third Team)
- 2006: Craig Smith (Second Team)
- 2007: Jared Dudley (Second Team)
- 2018: Jerome Robinson (Honorable Mention)

=== Big East Rookie of the Year ===
- 1985–86: Dana Barros
- 1990–91: Bill Curley
- 1995–96: James "Scoonie" Penn
- 1999–2000: Troy Bell

=== Big East Player of the Year ===
- 1980–81: John Bagley
- 2000–01: Troy Bell
- 2002–03: Troy Bell

=== ACC Player of the Year ===
- 2006–07: Jared Dudley

=== ACC Rookie of the Year ===
- 2012–13: Olivier Hanlan

=== National Coach of the Year ===
- 2000–01: Al Skinner

=== Big East Coach of the Year ===
- 1980–81: Tom Davis
- 1995–96: Jim O'Brien
- 2000–01: Al Skinner
- 2004–05: Al Skinner
