= Andy Geiger =

American college athletics administrator (born 1939)

Biographical details
- Born: March 23, 1939 (age 87)

Administrative career (AD unless noted)
- 1964–1970: Syracuse (assistant AD)
- 1970–1971: ECAC (asst. comm.)
- 1971–1975: Brown
- 1975–1979: Penn
- 1979–1990: Stanford
- 1990–1994: Maryland
- 1994–2005: Ohio State
- 2012–2013: Milwaukee (interim AD)

Ferdinand "Andy" Geiger (born March 23, 1939) is an American former athletic director at six different institutions, most recently holding that position from May 10, 2012, to August 30, 2013, at the University of Wisconsin-Milwaukee. His most notable time as an athletic director was when he spent 11 years at the helm of the largest athletic department in the US at Ohio State University, during some of which time he was flanked by controversy over various dealings regarding the former OSU running back, Maurice Clarett.

== Biography ==
A native of Syracuse, New York, Geiger graduated from Syracuse University in 1961 and was a member of the crew team as an undergraduate. He also was a member of the US squad that won a gold medal in the 1959 Pan American Games.

After graduation, Geiger accepted the job of freshman rowing coach at Dartmouth College in 1961. His first administrative role was as an assistant athletics director at his alma mater in 1964. He left Syracuse in 1970 to become assistant commissioner of the Eastern College Athletic Conference.

In 1971, at age 32, Geiger became athletics director at Brown University. He held that position until 1975, when he moved to the University of Pennsylvania in a similar capacity.

Geiger accepted the head athletics position at Stanford University in 1979. During his 11-year stay at the Pac-10 school, Stanford won a total of 27 national championships and was considered one of the leading programs in intercollegiate athletics.

In 1990, Geiger left Stanford to take over a Maryland program that was on NCAA probation. He spent a little more than three years at Maryland, working to return the athletics department to stability.

On April 29, 1994, Geiger was named athletic director at Ohio State. He officially assumed the position on May 16, 1994, succeeding the former NACDA president Jim Jones.

Geiger's enduring legacy in Columbus was a building program, sometimes referred to as "Andy-land", that resulted in a number of new athletic facilities on campus, most notably the 4,450-seat Bill Davis Stadium for baseball, the 10,000-seat Jesse Owens Memorial Stadium for track, soccer and lacrosse and the 19,200-seat Schottenstein Center for basketball and hockey as well as a $194 million renovation and expansion of Ohio Stadium in 1999 and 2000. The resulting debt service on "the Schott" was so burdensome that operation of the building was eventually transferred to the Office of Student Life which was in a better position to service the debt.

Geiger hired both Jim Tressel and Thad Matta as the head coaches to the American football team and men's basketball team respectively.

== Controversy ==
As a result of his decision in 2003 to end Maurice Clarett's football scholarship because of alleged violations of the amateur clause, Geiger was widely criticized. Jim Brown came to Clarett's defense. Brown went as far as to refer to Geiger as a "slave master".

On January 1, 2005, it was announced that Geiger would retire as athletic director with effect from June 30, 2005, and would remain with the university until June 2006. Geiger was an honorary captain for the Buckeyes for their September 15, 2007, game when they visited the Washington Huskies.

Geiger was announced as athletic director at the University of Wisconsin–Milwaukee on May 10, 2012. He became the third athletic director there within a two-year span, succeeding Rick Costello who resigned in April 2012. He was succeeded by Amanda Braun in 2013.

Geiger received the 2009 Homer Rice Award, presented by the Division I-A Athletic Directors' Association, the NACDA FBS Athletics Director of the Year Award for the Northeast Region in 2004, as well as the National Football Foundation & College Hall of Fame's John L. Toner Award and the Sports Business Journal Athletics Director of the Year Award, both in 2003.
