= Danya Abrams =

American basketball player

Personal information
- Born: September 24, 1974 (age 51) Westchester, New York, U.S.
- Listed height: 6 ft 7 in (2.01 m)
- Listed weight: 251 lb (114 kg)

Career information
- High school: Hackley School (Tarrytown, New York)
- College: Boston College (1993–1997)
- NBA draft: 1997: undrafted
- Playing career: 1997–2008
- Position: Power forward

Career history
- 1997: Atlantic City Seagulls
- 1997: Žalgiris Kaunas
- 1997–1998: Connecticut Pride
- 1998–1999: Valvi Girona
- 1999–2000: CB Cáceres
- 2000–2002: Unicaja Málaga
- 2002–2004: Caja San Fernando
- 2004–2005: CB Granada
- 2005–2006: Apollon Patras
- 2006–2007: Maroussi
- 2007–2008: Olympias Patras
- 2008: CB Inca

Career highlights
- Korać Cup champion (2001); 3× First-team All-Big East (1995–1997); Mr. New York Basketball (1993)

Danya Abrams (born September 24, 1974) is an American former basketball player who played for the Boston College Eagles during his time in the NCAA. He played professionally in Spain for Malaga, Sevilla, and Granada while in Greece for Apallon, Maroussi, and AEP Petras. He is from Greenburgh, New York. He starred with the Eagles from 1993 to 1997, getting selected first-team All-Big East Conference three times. Abrams finished his collegiate career with 2,053 points in 122 games.

In 1997, with the help of sophomore point guard Scoonie Penn, Abrams and Boston College won the Big East men's basketball tournament, before beating Valparaiso in the first round of the 1997 NCAA Tournament that year. In the second round, they went on to lose to Saint Joseph's 81–77 in overtime on March 15 in Salt Lake City.

After college he continued his basketball career, becoming a professional in Puerto Rico with the Baloncesto Superior Nacional's Santeros de Aguada, Spain, then later Greece, continuing to play the center and power forward positions until 2009, averaging over 14 points and six rebounds per game during his career.

On February 19, 2009, Abrams was selected as Boston College's representative for the ACC Basketball Tournament Legends.

== Coaching career ==
=== Wentworth Institute of Technology (2011-2012) ===
In July 2011, Abrams was named assistant coach of the men's basketball program at Wentworth Institute of Technology, a Division III school in Boston, Massachusetts that competes in the Commonwealth Coast Conference.

=== Boston College (2024-Present) ===
On September 12, 2024, Abrams returned to Boston College to serve as Director of Roster Management for the Boston College Eagles men's basketball team.

== Personal life ==
Abrams lives in Avon, Massachusetts with his wife Deanna and their children.

== See also ==
- List of NCAA Division I men's basketball players with 2000 points and 1000 rebounds
