= Victor Page =

American basketball player

Personal information
- Born: February 19, 1975 (age 51) Washington, D.C., U.S.
- Listed height: 6 ft 3 in (1.91 m)
- Listed weight: 200 lb (91 kg)

Career information
- High school: McKinley Tech (Washington, D.C.); The Winchendon School (Winchendon, Massachusetts)
- College: Georgetown (1995–1997)
- NBA draft: 1997: undrafted
- Playing career: 1997–2001
- Position: Shooting guard

Career history
- 1997–1998: Sioux Falls Skyforce
- 1998: Pop Cola 800s
- 1999: Sioux Falls Skyforce
- 1999–2000: Scaligera Basket
- 2000–2001: Sioux Falls Skyforce
- 2001: Fargo-Moorhead Beez

Career highlights
- CBA All-Rookie Team (1998); AP honorable mention All-American (1997); First-team All-Big East (1997); Big East All-Rookie team (1996)

Victor Martin Page (born February 19, 1975) is an American former basketball player who once played for the Georgetown University Hoyas and Sioux Falls Skyforce.

== Biography ==
=== Early years ===
Page grew up in Barry Farm in Southeast D.C. Page was a standout player at McKinley Tech High School. During his senior season he led the team the DC City Championship game where it lost to DeMatha Catholic. He averaging 31 points per game for the season. He was named Washington Post All DC Metro Basketball Player of the Year. He recorded a career-high 47 points in a single game in the 1993–94 season while at McKinley Tech. After his senior year of high school he spent an additional year at The Winchendon School, a prep school in Winchendon, Massachusetts.

=== Basketball career ===
As a freshman, Victor Page (jersey # 44) was a member of the 1995–96 Hoyas team that advanced to the quarterfinals of the NCAA Tournament led by Allen Iverson, and was named in the Big East All-Rookie team. In 1996–97, Page led the Big East in scoring and was named in the All-Big East first team. After his sophomore season, Page entered the 1997 NBA draft but was undrafted. He nearly made it to the Chicago Bulls as a free agent, but he overslept for a morning practice and was cut.

Page went 11th in the CBA draft; he briefly ascended to the NBA in September 1997 for the Minnesota Timberwolves' training camp roster, but was cut before the start of the season, and never played a regular-season game in the NBA.

He returned to the CBA to play for the Sioux Falls Skyforce and was selected to the CBA All-Rookie Team in 1998. Page remains one of the greatest players in Skyforce history; he left the team in 2001 as its all-time leading scorer (since passed). His jersey, #20, was retired in 2004. Yet he is also remembered for attacking an opponent with a broom. He played part of the 2001–02 season with the Fargo-Moorhead Beez. He also played in the 1998 PBA Centennial Cup in the Philippines with the Pop Cola 800s and in the Italian Serie A with Scaligera Basket of Verona in the 1999–00 season, averaging 18.3 points, 2.5 rebounds and 1.6 assists in 8 games played in Italy.

==== College statistics ====
Year	Team	GP	GS	MPG	FG%	3P%	FT%	RPG	APG	SPG	BPG	PPG
1995–96	Georgetown	37	33	26.1	.404	.333	.667	3.2	1.7	1.5	0.2	12.5
1996–97	Georgetown	30	30	32.3	.378	.373	.726	4.1	2.2	2.3	0.4	22.7
Career		67	63	29.2	.389	.358	.701	3.6	1.9	1.9	0.3	17.1

=== Recent years ===
In 2003, Page was shot in the right eye while in his childhood neighborhood. Page now wears an eyepatch.

In September 2013, Page was sentenced to ten years in jail for second-degree assault.

In June 2019, after being paroled for his previous offense, Page pled guilty to the assault and attempted rape of a 17-year-old girl in Prince George's County, Maryland. He was sentenced to 20 years in prison.
