= Scoonie Penn =

American basketball player and coach

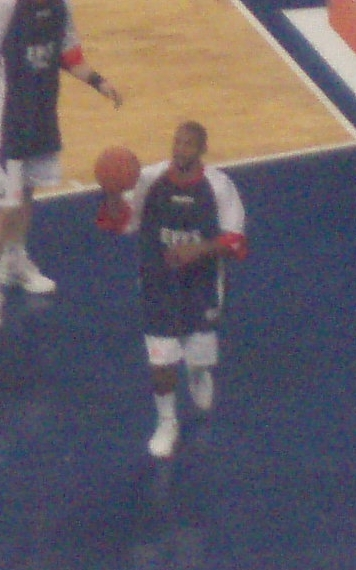
- Penn with Efes in 2008

Personal information
- Born: January 9, 1977 (age 49) Yonkers, New York, U.S.
- Listed height: 5 ft 11 in (1.80 m)
- Listed weight: 180 lb (82 kg)

Career information
- High school: Salem (Salem, Massachusetts)
- College: Boston College (1995–1997); Ohio State (1998–2000)
- NBA draft: 2000: 2nd round, 57th overall pick
- Drafted by: Atlanta Hawks
- Playing career: 2000–2011
- Position: Point guard
- Coaching career: 2019–present

Career history

Playing
- 2000–2001: Trieste
- 2001–2002: Virtus Roma
- 2002: Asheville Altitude
- 2002–2003: Crvena zvezda
- 2003–2004: Cibona
- 2004: Makedonikos
- 2004–2005: Scavolini Pesaro
- 2005–2006: Cibona
- 2006–2007: Olympiacos
- 2007–2008: Efes Pilsen
- 2008–2009: Kyiv
- 2009: Virtus Bologna
- 2010: Olympiacos
- 2010–2011: Prima Veroli

Coaching
- 2019–2024: Memphis Grizzlies (assistant)

Career highlights
- As player: 2× Croatian League champion (2004, 2006); Greek Cup winner (2010); Consensus second-team All-American (2000); Second-team All-American – USBWA (1999); Third-team All-American – AP, NABC (1999); Frances Pomeroy Naismith Award (2000); Big Ten co-Player of the Year (1999); 2× First-team All-Big Ten (1999, 2000); Big East Rookie of the Year (1996)
- Stats at Basketball Reference

James Donell "Scoonie" Penn (born January 9, 1977) is an American professional basketball coach and former player, who was most recently an assistant coach for the Memphis Grizzlies of the National Basketball Association (NBA). He was a point guard during his playing career that was spent primarily in Europe. Although Penn was selected in the 2000 NBA Draft by the Atlanta Hawks with the 57th overall pick, he never played a single game in the league.

== High school ==
Penn played high school basketball at Salem High School in Salem, Massachusetts. He led the team to a state championship in 1995.

== College career ==
After high school, Penn played college basketball at Boston College, before transferring to Ohio State University, where he teamed up to form a dominant back court with the future Milwaukee Bucks' shooting guard Michael Redd.

== Professional career ==
After college, Penn left the United States to play for the Adriatic League club Crvena zvezda (Red Star Belgrade).

Penn left Red Star the following season, and played in the 2005–06 season for Cibona Zagreb. In the 2006–07 season, he was a member of the Greek League club Olympiacos. He then moved to the Turkish Super League club Efes Pilsen, for the 2007–08 season, followed by the Ukrainian Super League club Kyiv, in the 2008–09 season.

At the beginning of the 2009–10 season, Penn made the move to the Italian League, to play with Virtus Bologna. On New Years Day, 2010, it was announced by Greek powerhouse Olympiacos, that Penn would return to the club, to replace Von Wafer, who had been released, due to his inability to adapt to the European game. In October 2010, he signed with Prima Veroli, which was playing in the Italian Second Division at the time.

== National team career ==
As a member of Team USA, Penn won a gold medal at the 1999 Palma Summer Universiade.

== Coaching career ==
After Penn retired from playing professional basketball, he became the director of player development for the Ohio State basketball program. On August 5, 2019, he accepted a position working as an assistant coach with the NBA's Memphis Grizzlies.

== Awards and accomplishments ==
College:

- 1995–96 Big East Conference Rookie of the Year, First Team All-Big East Conference member.
- 1996–97 First Team All-Big East Conference. Big East Conference tournament championship winner (MVP).
- 1998–99 Big Ten Conference Co-Player of the Year.
- 1998–99 Led Ohio State to the NCAA Final Four.
- 1999–00 Frances Pomeroy Naismith Award, as the nation's top senior under 6'0" (1.83 m) tall.
- Selected Third Team All-America, and First Team All-Big Ten Conference, in both his junior season and senior season. Ended his career at Ohio State University, as the college's all-time leader in three-point field goals made.
