= Phil Martelli =

American basketball coach (born 1954)

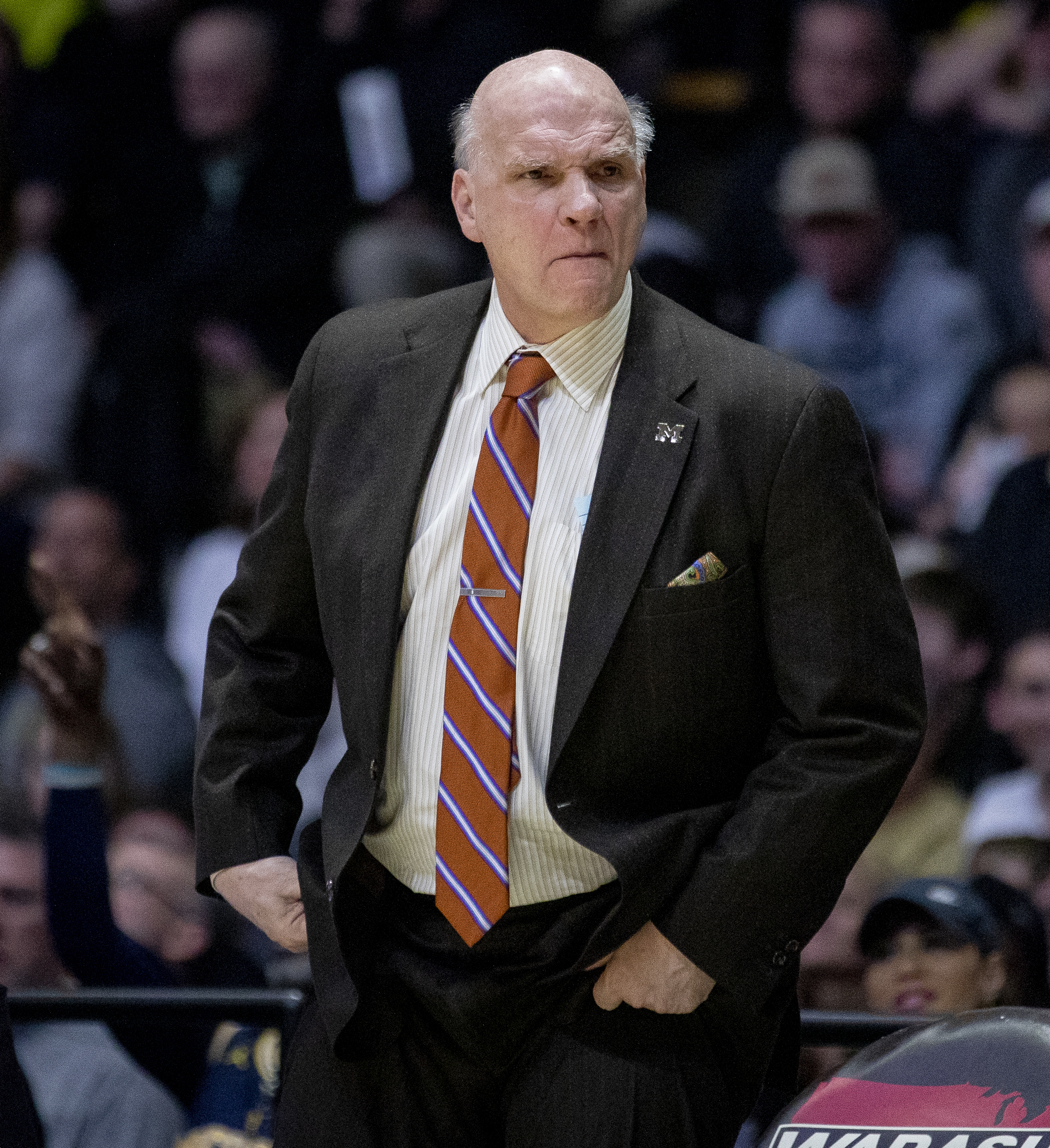
- Martelli in 2020

Biographical details
- Born: August 31, 1954 (age 72); Media, Pennsylvania, U.S.

Playing career
- 1972–1976: Widener
- Position: Point guard

Coaching career (HC unless noted)
- 1977–1978: Widener (assistant)
- 1978–1985: Bishop Kenrick HS (PA)
- 1985–1995: Saint Joseph's (assistant)
- 1995–2019: Saint Joseph's
- 2019–2024: Michigan (assoc. HC)
- 2022, 2023: Michigan (acting HC)

Head coaching record
- Overall: 446–330 (college)
- Tournaments: 7–7 (NCAA Division I); 10–6 (NIT)

Accomplishments and honors

Championships
- 3 Atlantic 10 tournament (1997, 2014, 2016); 4 Atlantic 10 regular season (1997, 2001, 2004, 2005); 4 Atlantic 10 East (2001, 2002, 2003, 2004)

Awards
- AP Coach of the Year (2004); Naismith Coach of the Year (2004); Henry Iba Award (2004); Jim Phelan Award (2004); Adolph Rupp Cup (2004); co-NABC Coach of the Year (2004); 4× Atlantic 10 Coach of the Year (1997, 2001, 2004, 2005)

Philip Martelli Sr. (born August 31, 1954) is an American college basketball coach, who was recently the associate head coach for the Michigan Wolverines.

As the former head coach of the St. Joseph's Hawks, he led Saint Joseph's to seven NCAA Tournaments and six National Invitation Tournament appearances in 24 seasons as head coach.

== Early life ==
Martelli was born on August 31, 1954, in Media, Pennsylvania. He attended high school at St. Joseph's Prep in Philadelphia, graduating in 1972. He played basketball on the 1970–71 team that won the Catholic League title under coach Eddie Burke. In 2023, he was inducted into the inaugural class of the school's Hall of Excellence.

== Playing career ==
Martelli was a point guard for Widener University. As point guard, he was part of the NCAA Division III tournament teams in 1974–75 and 1975–76, and held the school's single season and career assist marks (421) at the time he graduated. He still ranks third in overall assists as of 2022.

== Coaching career ==
=== Bishop Kenrick High School ===
After graduating from Widener, Martelli became an assistant coach for Widener (1976–77). The following season he became the head coach at Bishop Kenrick High School in Norristown, Pennsylvania. Future Basketball Hall of Fame coach Geno Auriemma was an assistant on Martelli's coaching staff for six years. He continues doing charitable work in the Norristown community, decades after his high school coaching days ended there.

=== St. Josephs (1985–2019) ===
Martelli began his career on Hawk Hill with SJU's 1985–86 NCAA Tournament team, as an assistant coach under Jim Boyle. In his decade as an assistant, he was part of the Hawks' NIT teams in 1992–93 and 1994–95. After 10 years as an assistant under Jim Boyle and John Griffin, Martelli was named the 14th coach in school history on July 20, 1995, and just the third non-alumnus to coach the school.

In his first season as head coach (1995–96) his team reached the final game of the NIT Tournament, losing to Nebraska 60–56. In his second year, under the floor generalship of Junior point guard Rashid Bey, and help from Arthur "Yah" Davis, Terrell Meyrs, and Dmitri Domani, Martelli's Hawks captured the Atlantic 10 (A-10) crown and made it into the Sweet Sixteen round of the NCAA tournament. St. Joe's ended the season ranked 12th nationally.

They would not duplicate that success until landing future Naismith College Player of the Year Jameer Nelson and former NBA players Delonte West and Dwayne Jones. In 2000–01, led by Marvin O'Connor, the team was 26–7 and reached the second round of the NCAA tournament; Nelson being named A-10 rookie-of-the-year. Led by Nelson and West, in 2002-2003, the Hawks were 23–7, but lost in the first round of the NCAA tournament.

With Nelson as point guard, Martelli led the 2003–04 Hawks to the greatest season in school history. The Hawks went 27–0 regular season. The Hawks lost to Xavier in the Atlantic 10 Tournament, and reached the Elite Eight, ultimately losing to Oklahoma State 64–62, to finish with a record of 30–2. This is "officially" the deepest run that St. Joseph's has ever made in the tournament; the 1960–61 team went all the way to the Final Four and won the third-place game, but that run was scrubbed from the books due to a gambling scandal. That year, Martelli was named Naismith College Coach of the Year, and Nelson player of the year. A banner honoring St. Josephs Perfect Season was hung and then taken down due to Delonte West's nefarious activities In 2004–05, Martelli led the Hawks back to the final game of the NIT, where they lost to South Carolina. During the season, Martelli won his 235th game on Hawk Hill, passing Hall of Famer Jack Ramsay as the second-winningest coach in school history; behind only Billy Ferguson (whom Martelli later surpassed).

In 2005–06, the Hawks returned to the NIT, eventually losing to Hofstra University. In 2008, Martelli led Saint Joseph's to its first NCAA Tournament since 2004 with a team led by Pat Calathes and Ahmad Nivins. In 2014, the Hawks returned to the NCAA Tournament after winning their second Atlantic 10 Championship under Martelli, led by Langston Galloway, Ronald Roberts and Halil Kanacević. The Hawks went on to lose in overtime to the eventual 2013–14 National Champion Connecticut Huskies in the Second Round of the Tournament.

In 2007, Phil Martelli's first book Don't Call Me Coach: A Lesson Plan For Life was published. Students at SJU often say "In Martelli We Trust" about their beloved basketball coach. Martelli had a weekly show during the basketball season called Hawk Talk which discusses the standing of the university and the basketball team.

In October 2008, Martelli signed a contract extension at St. Joe's through the 2015–16 season.

In December 2011, Martelli was referenced in an article on SI.com in which former player Todd O'Brien detailed his side of a story about his former coach holding a grudge. O'Brien had applied for a graduate student waiver, where he was allowed to transfer to pursue a post graduate degree in a field not offered by their original institution, but SJU would not release him to play. The NCAA denied O'Brien's appeal and SJU was legally unable to comment on the details of the case. Martelli refused to honor O'Brien's request and kept him in his contract for undisclosed reasons. Martelli was characterized by most reporters as being unreasonable about this for holding a grudge against O'Brien.

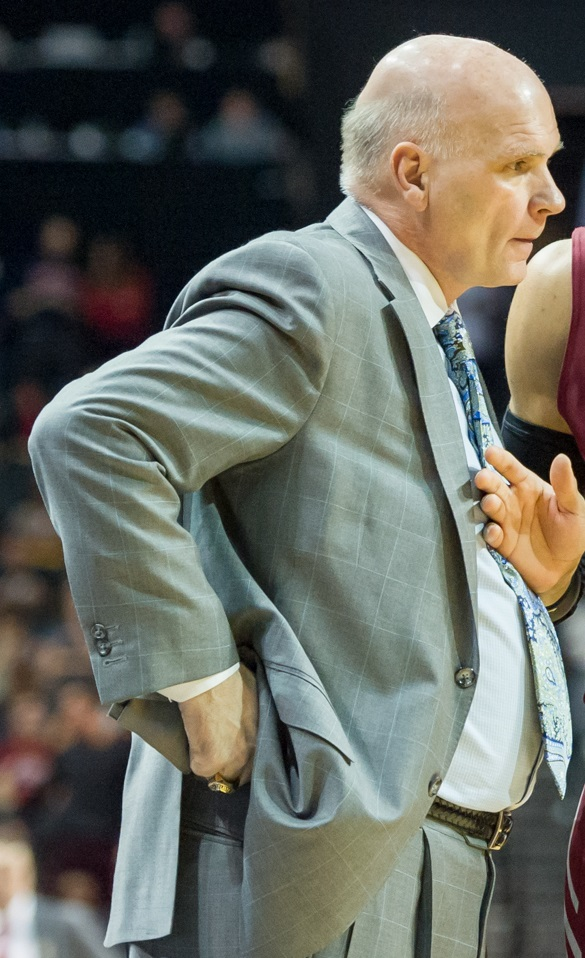
Martelli in 2016

With a win against Morgan State in 2011, Martelli became the all-time winningest coach in Saint Joseph's history with his 310th victory, passing Billy Ferguson.

On October 25, 2015, Saint Joe's announced that Martelli received another contract extension (though the terms of the deal were not immediately released). On March 13, 2016, Martelli claimed his second A-10 title in three years as the Hawks defeated VCU 87–74 in the 2016 Atlantic 10 Championship.

The 28 win season Martelli produced in 2015-16 would be the last of his NCAA tournament quality teams. Over the next 4 years, Martelli would experience multiple sub-500 teams. On March 19, 2019, Director of Athletics Jill Bodensteiner announced that the university had let go of Martelli, ending his 24-year tenure as head coach.

In his 24 years as head coach, Martelli's final record at St. Joe's was 444–328, with six regular season conference championships, three conference tournament championships, and seven NCAA tournament appearances; in addition to his teams' six NIT appearances. His 18 post-season wins are the most in school history. Martelli has also lost more games than any coach in Saint Joseph's history, eclipsing Bill Ferguson's 208 losses in 25 seasons.

=== Michigan (2019–2024) ===
On June 3, 2019, Martelli accepted a position as the associate head coach (second-in-command) at the University of Michigan. New Michigan head coach Juwan Howard, who had no experience coaching in college, asked Martelli to join his staff to provide college recruiting and game experience.

On February 22, 2022, Martelli was named as Michigan's interim head coach following Howard's suspension for the remainder of the 2021–22 regular season after he engaged in a physical altercation with Wisconsin coaching staff at the conclusion of a game between the two teams. He led Michigan to a 3–2 record with wins over rivals Michigan State and #23 Ohio State.

In September 2023, Martelli was designated as acting head coach after Howard had emergency heart surgery. Overall, filling in as head coach for Howard at Michigan, he was 8–7. Howard and staff were fired at the end of the 2023–24 season, making it Martelli's last season as Michigan's assistant coach.

== Broadcasting ==
Martelli hosted a show on WIP sports radio in Philadelphia in the 2000s. As of 2025, Martelli provides analysis for Fox Sports (debuting on November 9, 2024) and ESPN. In 2024, Martelli also started his own podcast, Make a Difference.

== Personal life ==
Martelli is married to Judy Marra, who played on two national championship basketball teams at Immaculata College. In 2014, Marra's Immaculata teams were inducted into the Naismith Memorial Basketball Hall of Fame. Martelli is close friends with long time University of Connecticut women's basketball coach Geno Auriemma. His son, Phil Jr., has served as the head coach of the VCU’s men's basketball team since March 25, 2025. His other son, Jimmy, serves as an assistant coach on the Penn State University men's basketball team.

Martelli has served as president of the National Association of Basketball Coaches' (NABC) Board of Directors; as a member of the NCAA Division I Men's Basketball Ethics Coalition; and on the NCAA Division I Oversight Committee.

== Honors ==
In 2021, Martelli received the National Association of Basketball Coaches Guardians of the Game Award for Leadership. In 2016, CollegeInsider.com presented Martelli with the Gene Bartow Award for outstanding achievement and contributions to the game.

Martelli served as chair of the Coaches vs. Cancer National Council for 12 years, and as the co-chair of the Philadelphia chapter of that organization. In 2017, he was the co-recipient of the American Cancer Society's Circle of Honor Award with Fran Dunphy of Temple University. Martelli and Dunphy led a group of Philadelphia area coaches in becoming one of the top fundraising groups in the country.

Martelli has been awarded honorary doctorates from Widener University (2004), Cabrini College (2006) and Immaculata University (2010).

== Head coaching record ==
Record table
Season	Team	Overall	Conference	Standing	Postseason
Saint Joseph's Hawks (Atlantic 10 Conference) (1995–2019)
1995–96	Saint Joseph's	19–13	9–7	3rd	NIT Runner-up
1996–97	Saint Joseph's	26–7	13–3	1st	NCAA Division I Sweet 16
1997–98	Saint Joseph's	11–17	3–13	5th (East)	
1998–99	Saint Joseph's	12–18	5–11	5th (East)	
1999–00	Saint Joseph's	13–16	7–9	4th (East)	
2000–01	Saint Joseph's	26–7	14–2	1st (East)	NCAA Division I Round of 32
2001–02	Saint Joseph's	19–12	12–4	1st (East)	NIT second round
2002–03	Saint Joseph's	23–7	12–4	1st (East)	NCAA Division I Round of 64
2003–04	Saint Joseph's	30–2	16–0	1st (East)	NCAA Division I Elite Eight
2004–05	Saint Joseph's	24–12	14–2	1st	NIT Runner-up
2005–06	Saint Joseph's	19–14	9–7	5th	NIT second round
2006–07	Saint Joseph's	18–14	9–7	6th	
2007–08	Saint Joseph's	21–13	9–7	5th	NCAA Division I Round of 64
2008–09	Saint Joseph's	17–15	9–7	5th	
2009–10	Saint Joseph's	11–20	5–11	T–11th	
2010–11	Saint Joseph's	11–22	4–12	12th	
2011–12	Saint Joseph's	20–14	9–7	5th	NIT first round
2012–13	Saint Joseph's	18–14	8–8	T–8th	NIT first round
2013–14	Saint Joseph's	24–10	11–5	T–3rd	NCAA Division I Round of 64
2014–15	Saint Joseph's	13–18	7–11	10th	
2015–16	Saint Joseph's	28–8	13–5	4th	NCAA Division I Round of 32
2016–17	Saint Joseph's	11–20	4–14	T–12th	
2017–18	Saint Joseph's	16–16	10–8	4th	
2018–19	Saint Joseph's	14–19	6–12	T–10th	
Saint Joseph's:		444–328 (.575)	218–176 (.553)		
Total:		444–328 (.575)			
National champion Postseason invitational champion Conference regular season champion Conference regular season and conference tournament champion Division regular season champion Division regular season and conference tournament champion Conference tournament champion

== Career highlights ==
- Philadelphia Sports Hall of Fame (2022)
- Widener University Athletics Hall of Fame as part of coaching staff on 1977-78 basketball team (2018)
- Big 5 Coach of the Year (2015–16)
- Atlantic 10 Coach of the Year (1997, 2001, 2004, 2005)
- Naismith College Coach of the Year (2004)
- Associated Press Coach of the Year (2004)
- 2004 Adolph Rupp Cup
- 2004 Chevrolet Coach of the Year
- 2004 Henry Iba Award (USBWA)
- 2004 NABC Co-Coach of the Year
- Head coach, Saint Joseph's University (1995–2019)
- Head coach, 2005 USA Basketball Under 21 World Championship Team
- NCAA berths: 1997, 2001, 2003, 2004, 2008, 2014, 2016
