= 1997 Atlantic 10 men's basketball tournament =

- Classification: Division I
- Season: 1996–97
- Teams: 12
- Site: CoreStates Spectrum; Philadelphia
- Champions: Saint Joseph's (2nd title)
- Winning coach: Phil Martelli (1st title)
- MVP: Rashid Bey (Saint Joseph's)

1996–97 Atlantic 10 men's basketball standings
	Conf.				Overall
Team	W		L	PCT	W		L	PCT
East
No. 12 Saint Joseph's †	13	–	3	.813	26	–	7	.788
Rhode Island	12	–	4	.750	20	–	10	.667
UMass	11	–	5	.688	19	–	14	.576
Temple	10	–	6	.625	20	–	11	.645
St. Bonaventure	5	–	11	.313	14	–	14	.500
Fordham	1	–	15	.063	6	–	21	.222
West
No. 13 Xavier	13	–	3	.813	23	–	6	.793
George Washington	8	–	8	.500	15	–	14	.517
Virginia Tech	7	–	9	.438	15	–	16	.484
Dayton	6	–	10	.375	13	–	14	.481
La Salle	5	–	11	.313	10	–	17	.370
Duquesne	5	–	11	.313	9	–	18	.333
† 1997 Atlantic 10 Tournament winner Rankings from AP Poll

The 1997 Atlantic 10 men's basketball tournament was played from March 5 to March 8, 1997. The tournament was played at the CoreStates Spectrum in Philadelphia, Pennsylvania. The winner was named champion of the Atlantic 10 Conference and received an automatic bid to the 1997 NCAA Men's Division I Basketball Tournament. Saint Joseph's defeated Rhode Island in the final to win the tournament. Massachusetts' second round loss to George Washington was their first loss in the conference tournament since 1991. Massachusetts, Rhode Island, Temple, and Xavier also received bids to the NCAA Tournament. Rashid Bey of Saint Joseph's was named the tournament's Most Outstanding Player. Future NBA player Tyson Wheeler of Rhode Island was among those also named to the All-Championship Team. The top two teams in each division received a first-round bye.

== Bracket ==
First round Wednesday, March 5
W4	Dayton	75
E5	St. Bonaventure	81
E3	UMass	64
W6	La Salle	49
E4	Temple	64
W5	Duquesne	47
W3	Virginia Tech	56
E6	Fordham	53

Quarterfinals; Thursday, March 6
E1	#19 Saint Joseph's	71
E5	St. Bonaventure	59
W2	George Washington	58
E3	UMass	49
W1	#11 Xavier	62^{OT}
E4	Temple	69
E2	Rhode Island	67
W3	Virginia Tech	63

Semifinals; Friday, March 7
E1	#19 Saint Joseph's	78
W2	George Washington	70
E4	Temple	66
E2	Rhode Island	69*

Final; Saturday, March 8
E1	#19 Saint Joseph's	61
E2	Rhode Island	56

All games played at The Spectrum, Philadelphia, Pennsylvania
