= 1996–97 Saint Joseph's Hawks men's basketball team =

American college basketball season

1996–97 Saint Joseph's Hawks men's basketball

Atlantic 10 Regular season co-champions Atlantic 10 tournament champions

NCAA tournament, Sweet Sixteen
- Conference: Atlantic 10

Ranking
- Coaches: No. 17
- AP: No. 12
- Record: 26–7 (13–3 Atlantic 10)
- Head coach: Phil Martelli (2nd season)
- Assistant coaches: Matt Brady (4th season); Monté Ross (1st season); Carlin Warley
- Home arena: Alumni Memorial Fieldhouse

1996–97 Atlantic 10 men's basketball standings
	Conf.				Overall
Team	W		L	PCT	W		L	PCT
East
No. 12 Saint Joseph's †	13	–	3	.813	26	–	7	.788
Rhode Island	12	–	4	.750	20	–	10	.667
UMass	11	–	5	.688	19	–	14	.576
Temple	10	–	6	.625	20	–	11	.645
St. Bonaventure	5	–	11	.313	14	–	14	.500
Fordham	1	–	15	.063	6	–	21	.222
West
No. 13 Xavier	13	–	3	.813	23	–	6	.793
George Washington	8	–	8	.500	15	–	14	.517
Virginia Tech	7	–	9	.438	15	–	16	.484
Dayton	6	–	10	.375	13	–	14	.481
La Salle	5	–	11	.313	10	–	17	.370
Duquesne	5	–	11	.313	9	–	18	.333
† 1997 Atlantic 10 Tournament winner Rankings from AP Poll

The 1996–97 Saint Joseph's Hawks men's basketball team represented Saint Joseph's University as a member of the Atlantic-10 Conference during the 1996–97 NCAA Division I men's basketball season. Led by 2nd year head coach Phil Martelli, the Hawks finished with an overall record of 26–7 (13–3 in A-10 play). Saint Joseph's won both regular season and A-10 Tournament titles, and received an automatic bid to the NCAA tournament as No. 4 seed in the West Regional. The team defeated Pacific and Boston College to advance to the Sweet Sixteen before losing to No. 1 seed Kentucky in the regional semifinal.

== Roster ==
1996–97 Saint Joseph's Hawks men's basketball team
Players	Coaches
Pos. / # / Name / Height / Weight / Year / Previous school / Hometown; PG / 11 / Rashid Bey / 6 ft 0 in (1.83 m) / 154 lb (70 kg) / Jr / Saint John Neumann HS / Philadelphia, Pennsylvania	Head coach: Phil Martelli (Widener); Assistant coach(es): Matt Brady (Siena); Monté Ross (Winston-Salem State); Carlin Warley (Saint Joseph's); Legend: (C) Team captain; (S) Suspended; (I) Ineligible; (W) Walk-on; Injured; Current redshirt

== Schedule and results ==
Date time, TV	Rank^{#}	Opponent^{#}	Result	Record	Site city, state
Regular season
Nov 20, 1996*		at No. 10 Duke; Preseason NIT	L 60–89	0–1	Cameron Indoor Stadium; Durham, North Carolina
Dec 3, 1996*		Wyoming	W 71–57	1–1	Alumni Memorial Fieldhouse; Philadelphia, Pennsylvania
Dec 7, 1996*		vs. No. 21 Tulsa; Coaches vs. Cancer Classic	W 67–64	2–1	Boardwalk Hall; Atlantic City, New Jersey
Dec 16, 1996*		DePaul	W 71–58	3–1	Alumni Memorial Fieldhouse; Philadelphia, Pennsylvania
Dec 19, 1996*		at East Carolina	L 64–68	3–2	Minges Coliseum; Greenville, North Carolina
Dec 23, 1996*		No. 10 Villanova; Philadelphia Big 5	L 65–81	3–3	Alumni Memorial Fieldhouse; Philadelphia, Pennsylvania
Dec 30, 1996*		vs. Austin Peay; Pepsi-Oneida Bingo & Casino Classic	W 74–58	4–3	Brown County Arena; Green Bay, Wisconsin
Dec 31, 1996*		at Green Bay; Pepsi-Oneida Bingo & Casino Classic	W 64–59	5–3	Brown County Arena; Green Bay, Wisconsin
Jan 5, 1997		at UMass	W 72–68	6–3 (1–0)	Mullins Center; Amherst, Massachusetts
Jan 9, 1997		St. Bonaventure	W 82–80 ^{2OT}	7–3 (2–0)	Alumni Memorial Fieldhouse; Philadelphia, Pennsylvania
Jan 11, 1997		at Rhode Island	L 70–74	7–4 (2–1)	Keaney Gymnasium; Kingston, Rhode Island
Jan 15, 1997		at George Washington	W 55–53	8–4 (3–1)	Charles E. Smith Center; Washington, D.C.
Jan 18, 1997		at Penn	W 66–61	9–4	The Palestra; Philadelphia, Pennsylvania
Jan 21, 1997		Duquesne	W 82–74	10–4 (4–1)	Alumni Memorial Fieldhouse; Philadelphia, Pennsylvania
Jan 25, 1997		Virginia Tech	W 68–50	11–4 (5–1)	Alumni Memorial Fieldhouse; Philadelphia, Pennsylvania
Jan 30, 1997		Temple	L 59–68	11–5 (5–2)	Alumni Memorial Fieldhouse; Philadelphia, Pennsylvania
Feb 2, 1997		Rhode Island	W 79–77	12–5 (6–2)	Alumni Memorial Fieldhouse; Philadelphia, Pennsylvania
Feb 4, 1997		Dayton	W 89–82	13–5 (7–2)	Alumni Memorial Fieldhouse; Philadelphia, Pennsylvania
Feb 6, 1997		Fordham	W 71–53	14–5 (8–2)	Alumni Memorial Fieldhouse; Philadelphia, Pennsylvania
Feb 8, 1997		No. 17 Xavier	W 79–65	15–5 (9–2)	Alumni Memorial Fieldhouse; Philadelphia, Pennsylvania
Feb 11, 1997*		Drexel	W 63–62	16–5	Alumni Memorial Fieldhouse; Philadelphia, Pennsylvania
Feb 13, 1997		at Temple	L 62–64	16–6 (9–3)	McGonigle Hall; Philadelphia, Pennsylvania
Feb 16, 1997		at Fordham	W 77–66	17–6 (10–3)	Rose Hill Gym; Bronx, New York
Feb 18, 1997*		Delaware	W 77–65	18–6	Alumni Memorial Fieldhouse; Philadelphia, Pennsylvania
Feb 22, 1997		at St. Bonaventure	W 86–50	19–6 (11–3)	Reilly Center; St. Bonaventure, New York
Feb 25, 1997	No. 23	UMass	W 78–63	20–6 (12–3)	Alumni Memorial Fieldhouse; Philadelphia, Pennsylvania
Mar 1, 1997	No. 23	at La Salle; Philadelphia Big 5	W 62–59	21–6 (13–3)	The Spectrum; Philadelphia, Pennsylvania
A-10 Tournament
Mar 6, 1997*	No. 19	St. Bonaventure; Quarterfinals	W 75–59	22–6	The Spectrum; Philadelphia, Pennsylvania
Mar 7, 1997*	No. 19	George Washington; Semifinals	W 78–70	23–6	The Spectrum; Philadelphia, Pennsylvania
Mar 8, 1997*	No. 19	Rhode Island; Championship Game	W 61–56	24–6	The Spectrum; Philadelphia, Pennsylvania
NCAA Tournament
Mar 13, 1997*	(4 W) No. 12	vs. (13 W) Pacific; First round	W 75–65	25–6	Jon M. Huntsman Center; Salt Lake City, Utah
Mar 15, 1997*	(4 W) No. 12	vs. (5 W) No. 23 Boston College; Second Round	W 81–77 ^{OT}	26–6	Jon M. Huntsman Center; Salt Lake City, Utah
Mar 20, 1997*	(4 W) No. 12	vs. (1 W) No. 5 Kentucky; West Regional semifinal – Sweet Sixteen	L 68–83	26–7	San Jose Arena (18,543); San Jose, California
*Non-conference game. ^{#}Rankings from AP poll. (#) Tournament seedings in parentheses. W=West.
