= 1996–97 Temple Owls men's basketball team =

American college basketball team

1996–97 Temple Owls men's basketball

NCAA tournament, Second round
- Conference: Atlantic 10 Conference
- Record: 20–11 (10–6 A–10)
- Head coach: John Chaney (15th season)
- Assistant coach: Dan Leibovitz (1st season)
- Home arena: McGonigle Hall

1996–97 Atlantic 10 men's basketball standings
	Conf.				Overall
Team	W		L	PCT	W		L	PCT
East
No. 12 Saint Joseph's †	13	–	3	.813	26	–	7	.788
Rhode Island	12	–	4	.750	20	–	10	.667
UMass	11	–	5	.688	19	–	14	.576
Temple	10	–	6	.625	20	–	11	.645
St. Bonaventure	5	–	11	.313	14	–	14	.500
Fordham	1	–	15	.063	6	–	21	.222
West
No. 13 Xavier	13	–	3	.813	23	–	6	.793
George Washington	8	–	8	.500	15	–	14	.517
Virginia Tech	7	–	9	.438	15	–	16	.484
Dayton	6	–	10	.375	13	–	14	.481
La Salle	5	–	11	.313	10	–	17	.370
Duquesne	5	–	11	.313	9	–	18	.333
† 1997 Atlantic 10 Tournament winner Rankings from AP Poll

The 1996–97 Temple Owls men's basketball team represented Temple University as a member of the Atlantic 10 Conference during the 1996–97 NCAA Division I men's basketball season. The team was led by head coach John Chaney and played their home games, for the final season, at McGonigle Hall. The Owls received an at-large bid to the NCAA tournament as No. 9 seed in the Midwest region. Temple beat Ole Miss in the opening round before losing to No. 1 seed and eventual Final Four participant Minnesota, 76–57, in the round of 32. Temple finished with a record of 20–11 (10–6 A-10).

== Roster ==
1996–97 Temple Owls men's basketball team
Players
Coaches

Pos.	#	Name	Height	Weight	Year	Hometown
G	4	Pepe Sánchez	6 ft 4 in (1.93 m)	—	Fr	Bahía Blanca, Argentina
G	21	Rasheed Brokenborough	6 ft 3 in (1.91 m)	195 lb (88 kg)	So	Philadelphia, Pennsylvania
F/C	25	Marc Jackson	6 ft 10 in (2.08 m)	260 lb (118 kg)	Jr	Philadelphia, Pennsylvania
F/C	32	Lamont Barnes	6 ft 10 in (2.08 m)	230 lb (104 kg)	Fr	Hopkinsville, Kentucky
F		Keaton Sanders	6 ft 6 in (1.98 m)	—	Fr
F		Damien Read	6 ft 6 in (1.98 m)	—

Head coach

- John Chaney

Assistant coach(es)

- Dan Leibovitz

Legend

- (C) Team captain
- (S) Suspended
- (I) Ineligible
- (W) Walk-on
- Injured
- Current redshirt

Roster

== Schedule and results ==
Date time, TV	Rank^{#}	Opponent^{#}	Result	Record	Site city, state
Regular Season
Dec 4, 1996*		Wisconsin	L 57–64 ^{OT}	0–1	McGonigle Hall (3,427); Philadelphia, Pennsylvania
Dec 7, 1996*		vs. Georgia Tech	W 76–58	1–1	Boardwalk Hall; Atlantic City, New Jersey
Dec 9, 1996*		Tulane	W 67–49	2–1	McGonigle Hall; Philadelphia, Pennsylvania
Dec 14, 1996*		at Tulsa	L 60–67	2–2	Tulsa Convention Center; Tulsa, Oklahoma
Dec 21, 1996*		Penn	W 69–45	3–2	McGonigle Hall; Philadelphia, Pennsylvania
Dec 27, 1996*		at No. 24 Oregon	L 62–82	3–3	McArthur Court; Eugene, Oregon
Dec 28, 1996*		vs. Bradley	W 69–63	4–3	Rose Garden Arena; Portland, Oregon
Jan 4, 1997*		at DePaul	W 73–60	5–3	Rosemont Horizon; Rosemont, Illinois
Jan 7, 1997		Rhode Island	L 72–79 ^{OT}	5–4 (0–1)	McGonigle Hall; Philadelphia, Pennsylvania
Jan 11, 1997		St. Bonaventure	W 68–53	6–4 (1–1)	McGonigle Hall; Philadelphia, Pennsylvania
Jan 13, 1997		Dayton	W 75–50	7–4 (2–1)	McGonigle Hall; Philadelphia, Pennsylvania
Jan 16, 1997*		at No. 4 Cincinnati; A-10/C-USA Challenge	W 70–55	8–4	Fifth Third Arena; Cincinnati, Ohio
Jan 19, 1997		at No. 14 Xavier	L 64–68 ^{OT}	8–5 (2–2)	Cincinnati Gardens; Cincinnati, Ohio
Jan 23, 1997		at Fordham	W 62–45	9–5 (3–2)	Rose Hill Gym; Bronx, New York
Jan 25, 1997		UMass	L 66–78	9–6 (3–3)	McGonigle Hall; Philadelphia, Pennsylvania
Jan 28, 1997		La Salle	W 70–67 ^{2OT}	10–6 (4–3)	McGonigle Hall; Philadelphia, Pennsylvania
Jan 30, 1997		at Saint Joseph's	W 68–59	11–6 (5–3)	Hagan Arena; Philadelphia, Pennsylvania
Feb 2, 1997*		No. 9 Louisville	W 67–44	12–6	McGonigle Hall; Philadelphia, Pennsylvania
Feb 4, 1997		at St. Bonaventure	L 55–73	12–7 (5–4)	Reilly Center; St. Bonaventure, New York
Feb 9, 1997		at Duquesne	W 83–68	13–7 (6–4)	A.J. Palumbo Center; Pittsburgh, Pennsylvania
Feb 13, 1997		Saint Joseph's	W 64–62	14–7 (7–4)	McGonigle Hall; Philadelphia, Pennsylvania
Feb 16, 1997		at Rhode Island	L 82–85	14–8 (7–5)	Keaney Gymnasium; Kingston, Rhode Island
Feb 18, 1997		at Virginia Tech	W 45–41	15–8 (8–5)	Cassell Coliseum; Blacksburg, Virginia
Feb 22, 1997		George Washington	W 71–59	16–8 (9–5)	McGonigle Hall; Philadelphia, Pennsylvania
Feb 24, 1997		Fordham	W 69–53	17–8 (10–5)	McGonigle Hall; Philadelphia, Pennsylvania
Mar 1, 1997		at UMass	L 53–59	17–9 (10–6)	Mullins Center; Amherst, Massachusetts
Atlantic 10 Tournament
Mar 5, 1997*		vs. Duquesne; First round	W 64–47	18–9	The Spectrum; Philadelphia, Pennsylvania
Mar 6, 1997*		vs. No. 11 Xavier; Quarterfinals	W 69–62 ^{OT}	19–9	The Spectrum; Philadelphia, Pennsylvania
Mar 7, 1997*		vs. Rhode Island; Semifinals	L 66–69 ^{OT}	19–10	The Spectrum; Philadelphia, Pennsylvania
NCAA Tournament
Mar 14, 1997*	(9 MW)	vs. (8 MW) Ole Miss; First round	W 62–40	20–10	Kemper Arena; Kansas City, Missouri
Mar 16, 1997*	(9 MW)	vs. (1 MW) No. 3 Minnesota; Second round	L 57–76	20–11	Kemper Arena; Kansas City, Missouri
*Non-conference game. ^{#}Rankings from AP Poll. (#) Tournament seedings in parentheses. MW=Midwst. All times are in Eastern Standard Time.

== Awards and honors ==
- Marc Jackson – Atlantic 10 Player of the Year
