= 1996–97 St. Francis Terriers men's basketball team =

American college basketball season

1996–97 St. Francis Terriers men's basketball
- Conference: Northeast Conference
- Record: 13–15 (7–11 NEC)
- Head coach: Ron Ganulin (6th season)
- Assistant coach: Glenn Braica (8th season)
- Home arena: Generoso Pope Athletic Complex

1996–97 Northeast Conference men's basketball standings
	Conf.				Overall
Team	W		L	PCT	W		L	PCT
Long Island†	15	–	3	.833	21	–	9	.700
Fairleigh Dickinson	13	–	5	.722	18	–	10	.643
Monmouth	12	–	6	.667	18	–	11	.621
Rider	10	–	8	.556	14	–	14	.500
Mount St. Mary's	10	–	8	.556	14	–	13	.519
Saint Francis (PA)	9	–	9	.500	12	–	15	.444
St. Francis Brooklyn	7	–	11	.389	13	–	15	.464
Wagner	7	–	11	.389	10	–	17	.370
Marist	4	–	14	.222	6	–	22	.214
Robert Morris	3	–	15	.167	4	–	23	.148
† 1997 NEC tournament winner

The 1996–97 St. Francis Terriers men's basketball team represented St. Francis College during the 1996–97 NCAA Division I men's basketball season. The team was coached by Ron Ganulin, who was in his sixth year at the helm of the St. Francis Terriers. The Terrier's home games were played at the Generoso Pope Athletic Complex. The team has been a member of the Northeast Conference since 1981.

The Terriers finished their season at 13–15 overall and 7–11 in conference play. They advanced to the NEC Tournament quarterfinals after defeating Robert Morris in the first round.

== Roster ==
1996–97 St. Francis Brooklyn Terriers men's basketball team
Players
Coaches

Pos.	#	Name	Height	Weight	Year	Hometown
F		Danny Manning	6 ft 7 in (2.01 m)	—	Sr
G	12	John Thomas	5 ft 9 in (1.75 m)	—	Jr
F	5	Ralph Auriantal	6 ft 7 in (2.01 m)	—	Jr	Montreal, Canada
G		Daimian Cosby	6 ft 3 in (1.91 m)	—	Jr
G	32	Tim Rail	6 ft 3 in (1.91 m)	185 lb (84 kg)	So	Staten Island, New York
F		Jason Smith	6 ft 7 in (2.01 m)	—	So
C		Andrew Chmiel	6 ft 10 in (2.08 m)	—	So
G		Omar Calhoun	6 ft 2 in (1.88 m)	—	So
G		Jan Espinosa	6 ft 3 in (1.91 m)	—	Fr
F	24	Angel Santana	6 ft 7 in (2.01 m)	210 lb (95 kg)	Fr	Las Palmas, Spain
C		Richard Lugo	6 ft 10 in (2.08 m)	235 lb (107 kg)	Fr	Caracas, Venezuela

Head coach

- Ron Ganulin (LIU Brooklyn '67)

Assistant coach(es)

- Glenn Braica (Queens College '89)

Legend

- (C) Team captain
- (S) Suspended
- (I) Ineligible
- (W) Walk-on
- Injured
- Current redshirt

== Schedule and results ==
Date time, TV	Opponent	Result	Record	Site (attendance) city, state
Regular season
November 26, 1996*	at Lehigh	W 74–69	1–0	Stabler Arena (542); Bethlehem, PA
November 30, 1996*	Brown	W 73–55	2–0	Generoso Pope Athletic Complex (316); Brooklyn, NY
December 3, 1996*	at Hartford	L 53–77	2–1	Chase Arena at Reich Family Pavilion (361); Hartford, CT
December 7, 1996*	at Morgan State	L 69–80	2–2	Talmadge L. Hill Field House (1,812); Baltimore, MD
December 7, 1996*	at Columbia	L 58–64	2–3	Levien Gymnasium (300); New York City, NY
December 14, 1996*	Central Connecticut	W 69–66	3–3	Generoso Pope Athletic Complex (217); Brooklyn, NY
December 20, 1996*	at South Florida	W 51–47 ^{OT}	4–3	USF Sun Dome (3,344); Tampa, FL
December 21, 1996*	vs. Central Connecticut	W 59–50	5–3	USF Sun Dome (3,319); Tampa, FL
NEC Regular Season
January 4, 1997	Robert Morris	W 53–45	6–3 (1–0)	Generoso Pope Athletic Complex (341); Brooklyn, NY
January 6, 1997	Saint Francis (PA)	L 64–74	6–4 (1–1)	Generoso Pope Athletic Complex (185); Brooklyn, NY
January 9, 1997	at Wagner	L 73–84	6–5 (1–2)	Spiro Sports Center (346); Staten Island, NY
January 9, 1997	at Monmouth	W 49–46	7–5 (2–2)	William T. Boylan Gymnasium (2,500); West Long Branch, NJ
January 15, 1997	at Rider	L 48–74	7–6 (2–3)	Alumni Gymnasium (1,040); Lawrenceville, NJ
January 18, 1997	Fairleigh Dickinson	L 71–82	7–7 (2–4)	Generoso Pope Athletic Complex (207); Brooklyn, NY
January 20, 1997	at Mount St. Mary's	W 54–52	8–7 (3–4)	Knott Arena (1,780); Emmitsburg, MD
January 23, 1997	at Marist	W 87–74	9–7 (4–4)	McCann Field House (1,580); Poughkeepsie, NY
January 25, 1997	Long Island; Battle of Brooklyn	L 64–68	9–8 (4–5)	Generoso Pope Athletic Complex (1,118); Brooklyn, NY
February 1, 1997	at Robert Morris	L 55–63	9–9 (4–6)	Charles L. Sewall Center (1,259); Moon Township, PA
February 3, 1997	at Saint Francis (PA)	L 67–77	9–10 (4–7)	DeGol Arena (737); Loretto, PA
February 6, 1997	Wagner	W 68–66	10–10 (5–7)	Generoso Pope Athletic Complex (207); Brooklyn, NY
February 8, 1997	Monmouth	L 61–81	10–11 (5–8)	Generoso Pope Athletic Complex (246); Brooklyn, NY
February 12, 1997	Rider	W 74–65	11–11 (6–8)	Generoso Pope Athletic Complex (185); Brooklyn, NY
February 14, 1997	at Fairleigh Dickinson	L 65–73	11–12 (6–9)	Rothman Center (614); Hackensack, NJ
February 17, 1997	Mount St. Mary's	L 69–86	11–13 (6–10)	Generoso Pope Athletic Complex (251); Brooklyn, NY
February 20, 1997	Marist	W 70–69 ^{OT}	12–13 (7–10)	Generoso Pope Athletic Complex (185); Brooklyn, NY
February 22, 1997	at Long Island	L 92–120	12–14 (7–11)	Schwartz Athletic Center (1,700); Brooklyn, NY
1997 NEC tournament
February 25, 1997	Robert Morris; First Round	W 62–59	13–14	Generoso Pope Athletic Complex (92); Brooklyn, NY
February 28, 1997	at Fairleigh Dickinson; Quarterfinals	L 69–72	13–15	Rothman Center (2,003); Hackensack, NJ
*Non-conference game. ^{#}Rankings from AP Poll. (#) Tournament seedings in parentheses.
