= 1996–97 Long Island Blackbirds men's basketball team =

American college basketball season

1996–97 Long Island Blackbirds men's basketball

Northeast Conference regular season and Tournament Champions

NCAA tournament, first round
- Conference: Northeast Conference
- Record: 21–9 (15–3 NEC)
- Head coach: Ray Haskins (2nd season)
- Home arena: Schwartz Athletic Center

1996–97 Northeast Conference men's basketball standings
	Conf.				Overall
Team	W		L	PCT	W		L	PCT
Long Island†	15	–	3	.833	21	–	9	.700
Fairleigh Dickinson	13	–	5	.722	18	–	10	.643
Monmouth	12	–	6	.667	18	–	11	.621
Rider	10	–	8	.556	14	–	14	.500
Mount St. Mary's	10	–	8	.556	14	–	13	.519
Saint Francis (PA)	9	–	9	.500	12	–	15	.444
St. Francis Brooklyn	7	–	11	.389	13	–	15	.464
Wagner	7	–	11	.389	10	–	17	.370
Marist	4	–	14	.222	6	–	22	.214
Robert Morris	3	–	15	.167	4	–	23	.148
† 1997 NEC tournament winner

The 1996–97 Long Island Blackbirds men's basketball team represented Long Island University during the 1996–97 NCAA Division I men's basketball season. The Blackbirds, led by 2nd year head coach Ray Haskins, played their home games at the Athletic, Recreation & Wellness Center and were members of the Northeast Conference. They finished the season 21–9, 15–3 in NEC play to capture the regular season championship. They also won the NEC tournament to earn an automatic bid in the 1997 NCAA tournament where they lost in the opening round to Villanova.

== Roster ==
1996–97 Long Island Blackbirds men's basketball team
Players	Coaches
Pos. / # / Name / Height / Weight / Year / Hometown; G / 22 / Charles Jones / 6 ft 3 in (1.91 m) / — / Jr / Brooklyn, New York	Head coach: Ray Haskins; Assistant coach(es) Legend: (C) Team captain; (S) Suspended; (I) Ineligible; (W) Walk-on; Injured; Current redshirt

== Schedule and results ==
Date time, TV	Rank^{#}	Opponent^{#}	Result	Record	Site (attendance) city, state
Regular season
Nov 23, 1996*		at St. John's	W 76–73	1–0	Alumni Hall (6,008); Queens, New York
Nov 27, 1996*		at Providence	L 88–100	1–1	Providence Civic Center (10,000); Providence, Rhode Island
Dec 7, 1996*		at Ohio State	L 73–97	1–2	St. John Arena (11,553); Columbus, Ohio
Dec 10, 1996*		No. 19 Xavier	L 86–94	1–3	Cincinnati Gardens (8,388); Cincinnati, Ohio
Dec 14, 1996*		at Niagara	W 104–84	2–3	Gallagher Center (919); Lewiston, New York
Dec 20, 1996*		vs. Jacksonville State; UAB Classic	W 90–81	3–3	Bartow Arena (3,245); Birmingham, Alabama
Dec 21, 1996*		at UAB; UAB Classic	L 69–74	3–4	Bartow Arena (3,513); Birmingham, Alabama
Dec 28, 1996*		at No. 15 Minnesota	L 84–104	3–5	Williams Arena (13,065); Minneapolis, Minnesota
Jan 4, 1997		Saint Francis (PA)	W 82–79 ^{OT}	4–5 (1–0)	Schwartz Athletic Center (1,650); Brooklyn, New York
Jan 6, 1997		Robert Morris	W 113–94	5–5 (2–0)	Schwartz Athletic Center (1,350); Brooklyn, New York
Jan 9, 1997		at Mount St. Mary's	W 102–82	6–5 (3–0)	Knott Arena (1,250); Emmitsburg, Maryland
Jan 11, 1997		Rider	W 99–76	7–5 (4–0)	Schwartz Athletic Center (1,700); Brooklyn, New York
Jan 15, 1997		Wagner	W 81–57	8–5 (5–0)	Schwartz Athletic Center (1,150); Brooklyn, New York
Jan 18, 1997		at Marist	L 84–88	8–6 (5–1)	McCann Arena (2,382); Poughkeepsie, New York
Jan 19, 1997		Fairleigh Dickinson	W 76–63	9–6 (6–1)	Schwartz Athletic Center (1,700); Brooklyn, New York
Jan 23, 1997		Monmouth	W 82–73	10–6 (7–1)	Schwartz Athletic Center (1,700); Brooklyn, New York
Jan 25, 1997		at St. Francis (NY)	W 68–64	11–6 (8–1)	Pope Physical Education Center (1,118); Brooklyn, New York
Feb 1, 1997		at Saint Francis (PA)	W 104–86	12–6 (9–1)	Maurice Stokes Athletic Center (1,503); Loretto, Pennsylvania
Feb 3, 1997		at Robert Morris	W 129–100	13–6 (10–1)	Charles L. Sewall Center (1,291); Moon Township, Pennsylvania
Feb 6, 1997		Mount St. Mary's	W 94–86	14–6 (11–1)	Schwartz Athletic Center (1,700); Brooklyn, New York
Feb 8, 1997		at Rider	L 97–103	14–7 (11–2)	Alumni Gymnasium (1,650); Lawrenceville, New Jersey
Feb 12, 1997		at Wagner	W 93–71	15–7 (12–2)	Sutter Gymnasium (1,700); Staten Island, New York
Feb 15, 1997		Marist	W 104–72	16–7 (13–2)	Schwartz Athletic Center (1,700); Brooklyn, New York
Feb 17, 1997		at Fairleigh Dickinson	W 99–80	17–7 (14–2)	Rothman Center (3,883); Hackensack, New Jersey
Feb 20, 1997		at Monmouth	L 97–102 ^{OT}	17–8 (14–3)	William T. Boylan Gymnasium (2,500); West Long Branch, New Jersey
Feb 22, 1997		St. Francis (NY)	W 120–92	18–8 (15–3)	Schwartz Athletic Center (1,700); Brooklyn, New York
Northeast Conference tournament
Feb 28, 1997*		Marist; Quarterfinals	W 99–88	19–8	Schwartz Athletic Center (1,700); Brooklyn, New York
Mar 3, 1997*		Rider; Semifinals	W 90–76	20–8	Schwartz Athletic Center (1,700); Brooklyn, New York
Mar 6, 1997*		Monmouth; Championship game	W 72–67	21–8	Schwartz Athletic Center (1,705); Brooklyn, New York
NCAA tournament
Mar 13, 1997*; CBS	(13 E)	vs. (4 E) No. 20 Villanova; First round	L 91–101	21–9	Lawrence Joel Coliseum (14,368); Winston-Salem, North Carolina
*Non-conference game. ^{#}Rankings from AP poll. (#) Tournament seedings in parentheses. E=East. All times are in Eastern Time.
