= 1997 Northeast Conference men's basketball tournament =

1997 basketball tournament

- Classification: Division I
- Season: 1996–97
- Teams: 10
- Finals site: Schwartz Athletic Center; Brooklyn, NY
- Champions: Long Island (2nd title)
- Winning coach: Ray Haskins (1st title)
- MVP: Charles Jones (Long Island)

The 1997 Northeast Conference men's basketball tournament was held in March. The tournament featured the league's ten teams, seeded based on their conference record. LIU Brooklyn won the championship, their second, and received the conference's automatic bid to the 1997 NCAA Tournament.

1996–97 Northeast Conference men's basketball standings
| | Conf. | | | | Overall |
| Team | W | | L | PCT | W | | L | PCT |
|---|---|---|---|---|---|---|---|---|
| Long Island† | 15 | – | 3 | .833 | 21 | – | 9 | .700 |
| Fairleigh Dickinson | 13 | – | 5 | .722 | 18 | – | 10 | .643 |
| Monmouth | 12 | – | 6 | .667 | 18 | – | 11 | .621 |
| Rider | 10 | – | 8 | .556 | 14 | – | 14 | .500 |
| Mount St. Mary's | 10 | – | 8 | .556 | 14 | – | 13 | .519 |
| Saint Francis (PA) | 9 | – | 9 | .500 | 12 | – | 15 | .444 |
| St. Francis Brooklyn | 7 | – | 11 | .389 | 13 | – | 15 | .464 |
| Wagner | 7 | – | 11 | .389 | 10 | – | 17 | .370 |
| Marist | 4 | – | 14 | .222 | 6 | – | 22 | .214 |
| Robert Morris | 3 | – | 15 | .167 | 4 | – | 23 | .148 |
† 1997 NEC tournament winner

== Format ==
The NEC Men's Basketball Tournament consisted of a ten-team playoff format with all games played at the venue of the higher seed. The first round was played by the four lowest seeds (7–10) and the other teams received a bye.

== Bracket ==
First round
8 | Wagner | 60
9 | Marist | 62
7 | St. Francis Brooklyn | 62
10 | Robert Morris | 59

Quarterfinals
1 | Long Island | 99
9 | Marist | 88
4 | Rider | 80
5 | Mount St. Mary's | 77
2 | Fairleigh Dickinson | 72
7 | St. Francis Brooklyn | 69
3 | Monmouth | 75
6 | Saint Francis (PA) | 68

Semifinals
1 | Long Island | 90
4 | Rider | 76
2 | Fairleigh Dickinson | 72^{2OT}
3 | Monmouth | 73

Championship Game
1 | Long Island | 72
3 | Monmouth | 67

== All-tournament team ==
Tournament MVP in bold.

**1997 NEC All-Tournament Team**

**Charles Jones**, LIU
Corey Albano, MU
Mustafa Barksdale, MU
Mike Campbell, LIU
Dave Masciale, LIU
Richie Parker, LIU
