= 1996–97 Rhode Island Rams men's basketball team =

American college basketball season

1996–97 Rhode Island Rams men's basketball

NCAA tournament, First Round
- Conference: Atlantic 10 Conference
- Record: 20–10 (12–4 A-10)
- Head coach: Al Skinner (9th season)
- Home arena: Keaney Gymnasium

1996–97 Atlantic 10 men's basketball standings
	Conf.				Overall
Team	W		L	PCT	W		L	PCT
East
No. 12 Saint Joseph's †	13	–	3	.813	26	–	7	.788
Rhode Island	12	–	4	.750	20	–	10	.667
UMass	11	–	5	.688	19	–	14	.576
Temple	10	–	6	.625	20	–	11	.645
St. Bonaventure	5	–	11	.313	14	–	14	.500
Fordham	1	–	15	.063	6	–	21	.222
West
No. 13 Xavier	13	–	3	.813	23	–	6	.793
George Washington	8	–	8	.500	15	–	14	.517
Virginia Tech	7	–	9	.438	15	–	16	.484
Dayton	6	–	10	.375	13	–	14	.481
La Salle	5	–	11	.313	10	–	17	.370
Duquesne	5	–	11	.313	9	–	18	.333
† 1997 Atlantic 10 Tournament winner Rankings from AP Poll

The 1996–97 Rhode Island Rams men's basketball team represented the University of Rhode Island in the 1996–97 college basketball season. Led by head coach Al Skinner, the Rams competed in the Atlantic 10 Conference and played their home games at Keaney Gymnasium. They finished the season 20–10, 12–4 in A-10 play and lost in the championship game of the 1997 Atlantic 10 men's basketball tournament. They were invited to the 1997 NCAA tournament as the No. 9 seed in the Southeast region. Rhode Island was beaten by No. 8 seed Purdue, 83–76 in overtime, in the opening round.

== Roster ==
1996–97 Rhode Island Rams men's basketball team
Players
Coaches

Pos.	#	Name	Height	Weight	Year	Hometown
G	12	Cuttino Mobley	6 ft 4 in (1.93 m)	185 lb (84 kg)	Jr	Philadelphia, Pennsylvania
G	21	Tyson Wheeler	5 ft 10 in (1.78 m)	165 lb (75 kg)	Jr	New London, Connecticut
F/C	34	Antonio Reynolds-Dean	6 ft 7 in (2.01 m)	210 lb (95 kg)	So	Marietta, Georgia

Head coach

- Jim Harrick

Assistant coach(es)

Legend

- (C) Team captain
- (S) Suspended
- (I) Ineligible
- (W) Walk-on
- Injured
- Current redshirt

== Schedule and results ==
Date time, TV	Rank^{#}	Opponent^{#}	Result	Record	Site (attendance) city, state
Regular season
Nov 23, 1996*		at Siena	W 91–57	1–0	Times Union Center; Loudonville, New York
Nov 27, 1996*		at No. 18 Texas	L 79–86	1–1	Frank Erwin Center; Austin, Texas
Nov 30, 1996*		Fairleigh Dickinson	W 115–66	2–1	Keaney Gymnasium; Kingston, Rhode Island
Dec 4, 1996*		Brown	W 86–49	3–1	Keaney Gymnasium; Kingston, Rhode Island
Dec 10, 1996*		at Providence	W 96–79	4–1	Providence Civic Center; Providence, Rhode Island
Dec 17, 1996*		No. 16 Minnesota	L 72–82	4–2	Keaney Gymnasium; Kingston, Rhode Island
Dec 23, 1996*		Boston University	W 69–61	5–2	Keaney Gymnasium; Kingston, Rhode Island
Dec 29, 1996*		vs. San Francisco	W 93–76	6–2	Continental Airlines Arena; East Rutherford, New Jersey
Dec 30, 1996*		at Seton Hall	L 70–72	6–3	Continental Airlines Arena; East Rutherford, New Jersey
Jan 2, 1997*		Iona	L 84–89	6–4	Keaney Gymnasium; Kingston, Rhode Island
Jan 4, 1997		Dayton	W 97–68	7–4 (1–0)	Keaney Gymnasium; Kingston, Rhode Island
Jan 7, 1997		at Temple	W 79–72 ^{OT}	8–4 (2–0)	McGonigle Hall; Philadelphia, Pennsylvania
Jan 11, 1997		Saint Joseph's	W 74–70	9–4 (3–0)	Keaney Gymnasium; Kingston, Rhode Island
Jan 16, 1997		at Duquesne	W 85–83	10–4 (4–0)	A.J. Palumbo Center; Pittsburgh, Pennsylvania
Jan 18, 1997		at Virginia Tech	W 73–52	11–4 (5–0)	Cassell Coliseum; Blacksburg, Virginia
Jan 21, 1997		at UMass	L 60–64	11–5 (5–1)	Mullins Center; Amherst, Massachusetts
Jan 25, 1997		St. Bonaventure	W 79–66	12–5 (6–1)	Keaney Gymnasium; Kingston, Rhode Island
Jan 28, 1997		at No. 20 Xavier	L 79–91	12–6 (6–2)	Cincinnati Gardens; Cincinnati, Ohio
Feb 2, 1997		at Saint Joseph's	L 77–79	12–7 (6–3)	Hagan Arena; Philadelphia, Pennsylvania
Feb 6, 1997		La Salle	W 92–61	13–7 (7–3)	Keaney Gymnasium; Kingston, Rhode Island
Feb 8, 1997		UMass	L 61–64	13–8 (7–4)	Providence Civic Center; Providence, Rhode Island
Feb 11, 1997		Fordham	W 110–72	14–8 (8–4)	Keaney Gymnasium; Kingston, Rhode Island
Feb 16, 1997		Temple	W 85–82	15–8 (9–4)	Keaney Gymnasium; Kingston, Rhode Island
Feb 20, 1997		at St. Bonaventure	W 78–73	16–8 (10–4)	Reilly Center; St. Bonaventure, New York
Feb 26, 1997		George Washington	W 83–72	17–8 (11–4)	Keaney Gymnasium; Kingston, Rhode Island
Mar 1, 1997		at Fordham	W 85–58	18–8 (12–4)	Rose Hill Gym; Bronx, New York
Atlantic 10 tournament
Mar 6, 1997*		vs. Virginia Tech; Quarterfinals	W 67–63	19–8	The Spectrum; Philadelphia, Pennsylvania
Mar 7, 1997*		vs. Temple; Semifinals	W 69–66 ^{OT}	20–8	The Spectrum; Philadelphia, Pennsylvania
Mar 8, 1997*		at No. 19 Saint Joseph's; Championship game	L 56–61	20–9	The Spectrum; Philadelphia, Pennsylvania
NCAA tournament
Mar 13, 1997*	(9 SE)	vs. (8 SE) Purdue; First round	L 76–83 ^{OT}	20–10	The Pyramid; Memphis, Tennessee
*Non-conference game. ^{#}Rankings from AP poll. (#) Tournament seedings in parentheses. SE=Southeast. All times are in EST.
