= 1996–97 UMass Minutemen basketball team =

American college basketball season

1996–97 UMass Minutemen men's basketball
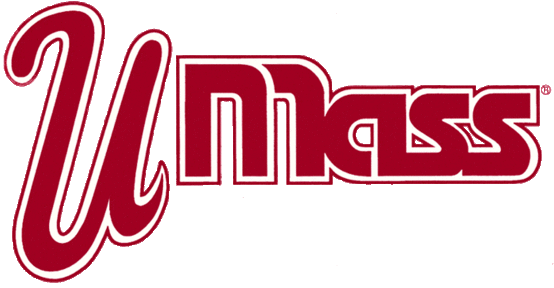

NCAA Tournament, Round of 64
- Conference: Atlantic 10 Conference
- Record: 19–14 (11–5 A-10)
- Head coach: Bruiser Flint (1st season)
- Assistant coaches: Geoff Arnold; Tony Barbee; John Robic
- Home arena: William D. Mullins Memorial Center

1996–97 Atlantic 10 men's basketball standings
	Conf.				Overall
Team	W		L	PCT	W		L	PCT
East
No. 12 Saint Joseph's †	13	–	3	.813	26	–	7	.788
Rhode Island	12	–	4	.750	20	–	10	.667
UMass	11	–	5	.688	19	–	14	.576
Temple	10	–	6	.625	20	–	11	.645
St. Bonaventure	5	–	11	.313	14	–	14	.500
Fordham	1	–	15	.063	6	–	21	.222
West
No. 13 Xavier	13	–	3	.813	23	–	6	.793
George Washington	8	–	8	.500	15	–	14	.517
Virginia Tech	7	–	9	.438	15	–	16	.484
Dayton	6	–	10	.375	13	–	14	.481
La Salle	5	–	11	.313	10	–	17	.370
Duquesne	5	–	11	.313	9	–	18	.333
† 1997 Atlantic 10 Tournament winner Rankings from AP Poll

The 1996–97 UMass Minutemen basketball team represented the University of Massachusetts Amherst during the 1996–97 NCAA Division I men's basketball season. The Minutemen, led by first year head coach Bruiser Flint, played their home games at William D. Mullins Memorial Center and are members of the Atlantic 10 Conference. The team finished the season 19–14, 11–5 in A-10 play to finish in third place. In the postseason, the team lost in the quarterfinal of the A-10 tournament and in the first round of the NCAA tournament.

In June 1996, assistant coach Bruiser Flint was promoted to the role of head coach following the departure of previous head coach John Calipari.

== Roster ==
Number	Name	Position	Height	Weight	Year	Hometown
3	Charlton Clarke	Guard	6–3	205	Sophomore	Bronx, New York
4	Lari Ketner	Center	6-10	270	Sophomore	Philadelphia
10	Ross Burns	Guard	6–3	180	Sophomore	Greenfield, Massachusetts
12	Edgar Padilla	Guard	6-2	175	Senior	Toa Alta, Puerto Rico
14	Andy Maclay	Guard	6–4	190	Sophomore	Stroudsburg, Pennsylvania
20	Winston Smith	Forward	6–5	195	Freshman	Summit, New Jersey
22	Chris Kirkland	Forward	6–6	200	Freshman	Pittsburgh, Pennsylvania
23	Mike Babul	Forward	6–6	190	Freshman	North Attleboro, Massachusetts
24	Carmelo Travieso	Guard	6–2	180	Senior	Boston, Massachusetts
34	Tyrone Weeks	Forward	6-7	260	Senior	Philadelphia
42	Ajmal Basit	Center/Forward	6–9	220	Freshman	Brooklyn, New York
50	Inus Norville	Forward	6–8	225	Junior	Fayetteville, North Carolina

== Schedule ==
Date time, TV	Rank^{#}	Opponent^{#}	Result	Record	Site (attendance) city, state
Regular season
11/25/1996*	No. 15	vs. Chaminade; Maui Invitational	W 59–48	1–0	Lahaina Civic Center (2,500); Lahaina, Hawaii
11/26/1996*	No. 17	vs. Virginia; Maui Invitational	L 68–75	1–1	Lahaina Civic Center (2,500); Lahaina, Hawaii
11/27/1996*	No. 17	vs. California; Maui Invitational	L 55–59	1–2	Lahaina Civic Center (2,500); Lahaina, Hawaii
12/4/1996*		vs. Georgetown; Great Eight	L 53–58	1–3	United Center (-); Chicago
12/07/1996*		Wyoming	W 90–72	2–3	Mullins Center (9,493); Amherst, Massachusetts
12/10/1996*		No. 16 Fresno State	L 81–102	2–4	Mullins Center (9,493); Amherst, Massachusetts
12/12/1996*		Drexel	W 69–48	3–4	Mullins Center (9,493); Amherst, Massachusetts
12/14/1996*		at No. 2 Wake Forest	L 47–71	3–5	Lawrence Joel Veterans Memorial Coliseum (14,111); Winston-Salem, North Carolina
12/20/1996*		vs. No. 12 North Carolina; Jimmy V Classic	L 69–83	3–6	Meadowlands (13,812); East Rutherford, New Jersey
12/22/1996*		at UNC Wilmington	W 47–46	4–6	Trask Coliseum (2,543); Wilmington, North Carolina
12/27/1996*		at Connecticut; U-Game	L 61–64	4–7	Hartford Civic Center (-); Hartford, Connecticut
1/2/1997		Davidson	W 77–64	5–7	Mullins Center (9,493); Amherst, Massachusetts
01/05/1997		St. Joseph's	L 68–72	5–8 (0–1)	Mullins Center (9,493); Amherst, Massachusetts
01/08/1997		at La Salle	W 56–50	6–8 (1–1)	First Union Spectrum (2,551); Philadelphia
01/12/1997		Virginia Tech	L 47–63	6–9 (1–2)	Mullins Center (9,493); Amherst, Massachusetts
01/14/1997		at St. Bonaventure	W 63–59	7–9 (2–2)	Reilly Center (6,000); St. Bonaventure, New York
01/18/1997*		vs. No. 19 Boston College; Commonwealth Classic	W 90–78	8–9	Fleet Center (15,215); Boston, Massachusetts
01/21/1997		at Rhode Island	W 64–60	9–9 (3–2)	Mullins Center (9,493); Amherst, Massachusetts
01/25/1997		at Temple	W 78–66	10–9 (4–2)	McGonigle Hall (3,913); Philadelphia, Pennsylvania
01/30/1997		at George Washington	W 68–63	11–9 (5–2)	Charles E. Smith Center (5,454); Washington, D.C.
02/01/1997		No. 20 Xavier	L 84–87 ^{OT}	11–10 (5–3)	Mullins Center (9,493); Amherst, Massachusetts
02/03/1997		at Fordham	W 75–54	12–10 (6–3)	Rose Hill Gymnasium (2,435); Bronx, New York
02/06/1997		Duquesne	W 73–71	13–10 (7–3)	Mullins Center (9,493); Amherst, Massachusetts
2/08/1997		at Rhode Island	W 64–61	14–10 (8–3)	Providence Civic Center (12,931); Providence, Rhode Island
02/11/1997		St. Bonaventure	W 74–68	15–10 (9–3)	Mullins Center (9,493); Amherst, Massachusetts
02/15/1997*		No. 10 Maryland	W 78–61	16–10	Worcester Centrum (11,210); Worcester, Massachusetts
02/20/1997		Fordham	W 75–58	17–10 (10–3)	Mullins Center (9,493); Amherst, Massachusetts
02/23/1997		at Dayton	L 67–69	17–11 (10–4)	UD Arena (11,893); Dayton, Ohio
02/25/1997		at No. 23 St. Joseph's	L 63–78	17–12 (10–5)	Alumni Memorial Fieldhouse (3,200); Philadelphia
03/01/1997		Temple	W 59–53	18–12 (11–5)	Mullins Center (9,493); Amherst, Massachusetts
1997 Atlantic 10 men's basketball tournament
03/05/1997		vs. La Salle; 1st Round	W 64–49	19–12	CoreStates Spectrum (-); Philadelphia
03/06/1997		vs. George Washington; Quarterfinal	L 49–58	19–13	CoreStates Spectrum (10,005); Philadelphia
1997 NCAA Division I men's basketball tournament
03/14/1997*		vs. Louisville; First Round	L 57–65	19–14	Civic Arena (17,509); Pittsburgh, Pennsylvania
*Non-conference game. ^{#}Rankings from AP Poll. (#) Tournament seedings in parentheses. All times are in Eastern Time.
