= Adolph Rupp Cup =

Former award for American college basketball coaches

- Awarded for: the nation's NCAA Division I head coach "who best exemplifies excellence in his dedication to the game of basketball and to his student athletes"
- Country: United States
- Presented by: Commonwealth Athletic Club of Kentucky

History
- First award: 2004
- Final award: 2015

The Adolph Rupp Cup was an award given annually from 2004 through 2015 to the NCAA Division I men's college basketball head coach "who best exemplifies excellence in his dedication to the game of basketball and to his student athletes." It was considered a national coach of the year award and was named for former University of Kentucky head coach Adolph Rupp, who compiled an overall record of 876–190 with four recognized national championships and one National Invitation Tournament (NIT) championship. Rupp coached Kentucky from 1930 to 1972 and his career winning percentage of 82.2% is still the NCAA Division I record. The Adolph Rupp Cup was presented by the Commonwealth Athletic Club of Kentucky.

== Key ==
Coach (X)	Denotes the number of times the coach has been awarded the Adolph Rupp Cup at that point
W, L, W %	Total wins, total losses, win percentage
Finish	National postseason tournament result

== Winners ==
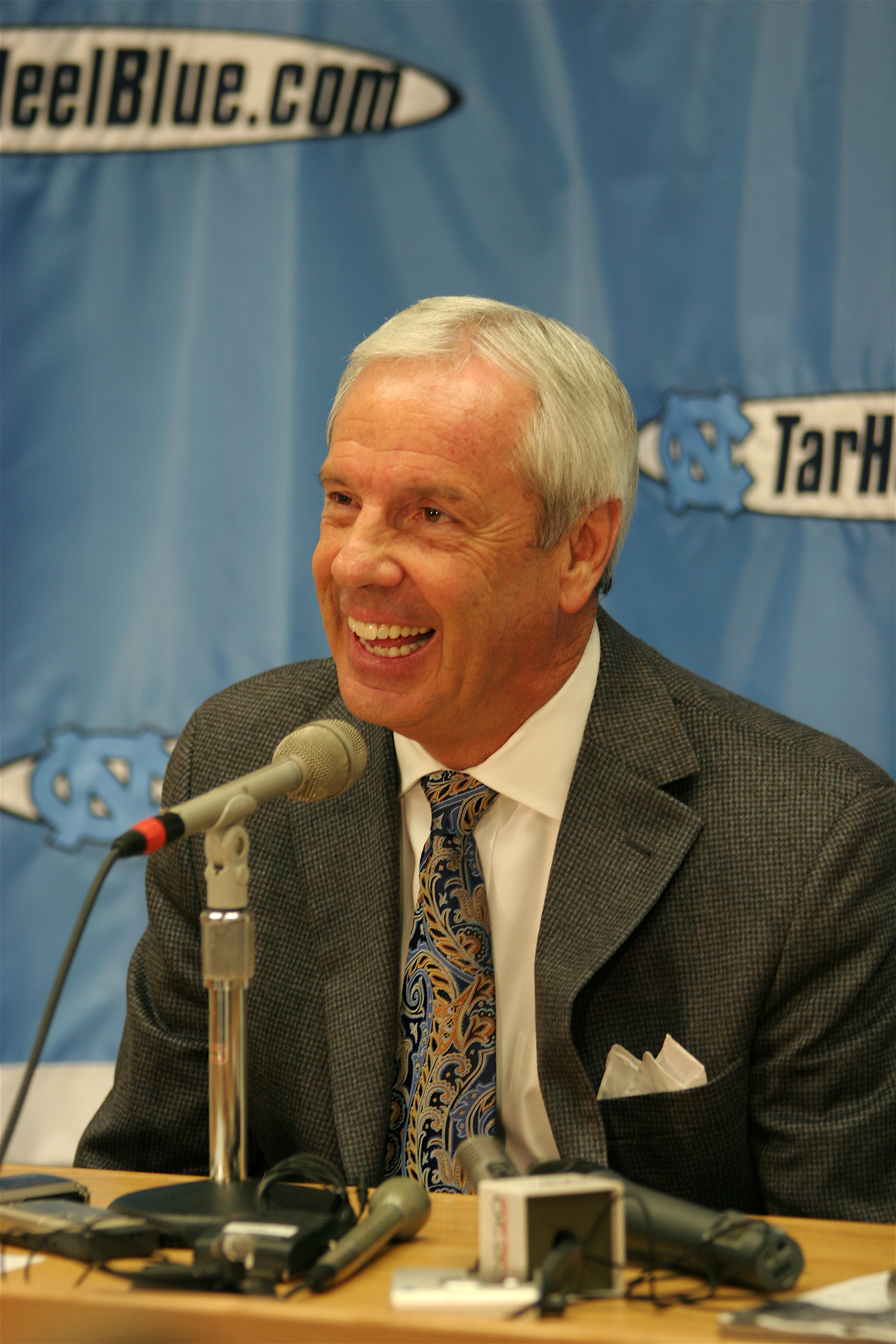
Roy Williams, North Carolina, 2006

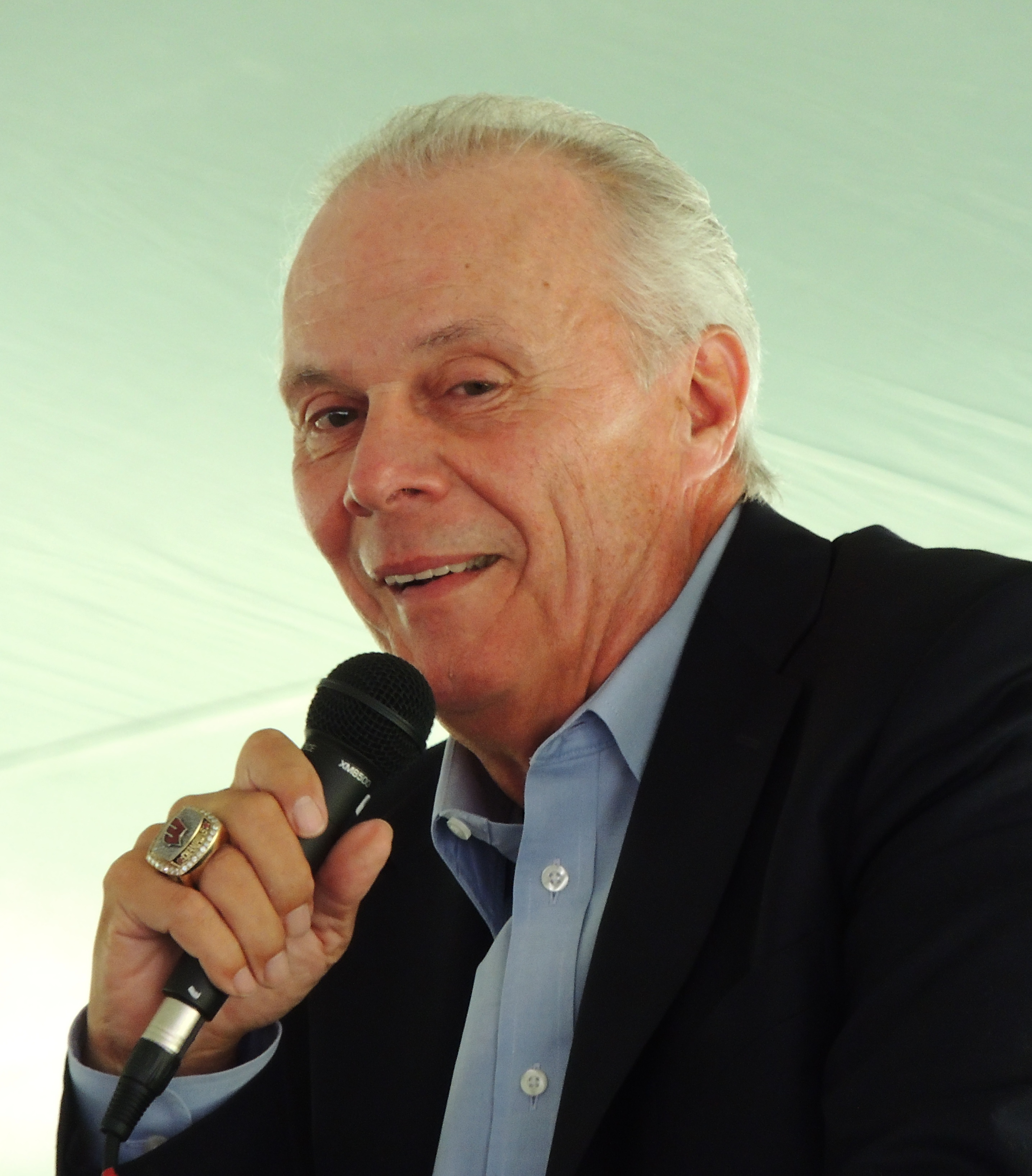
Bo Ryan, Wisconsin, 2007

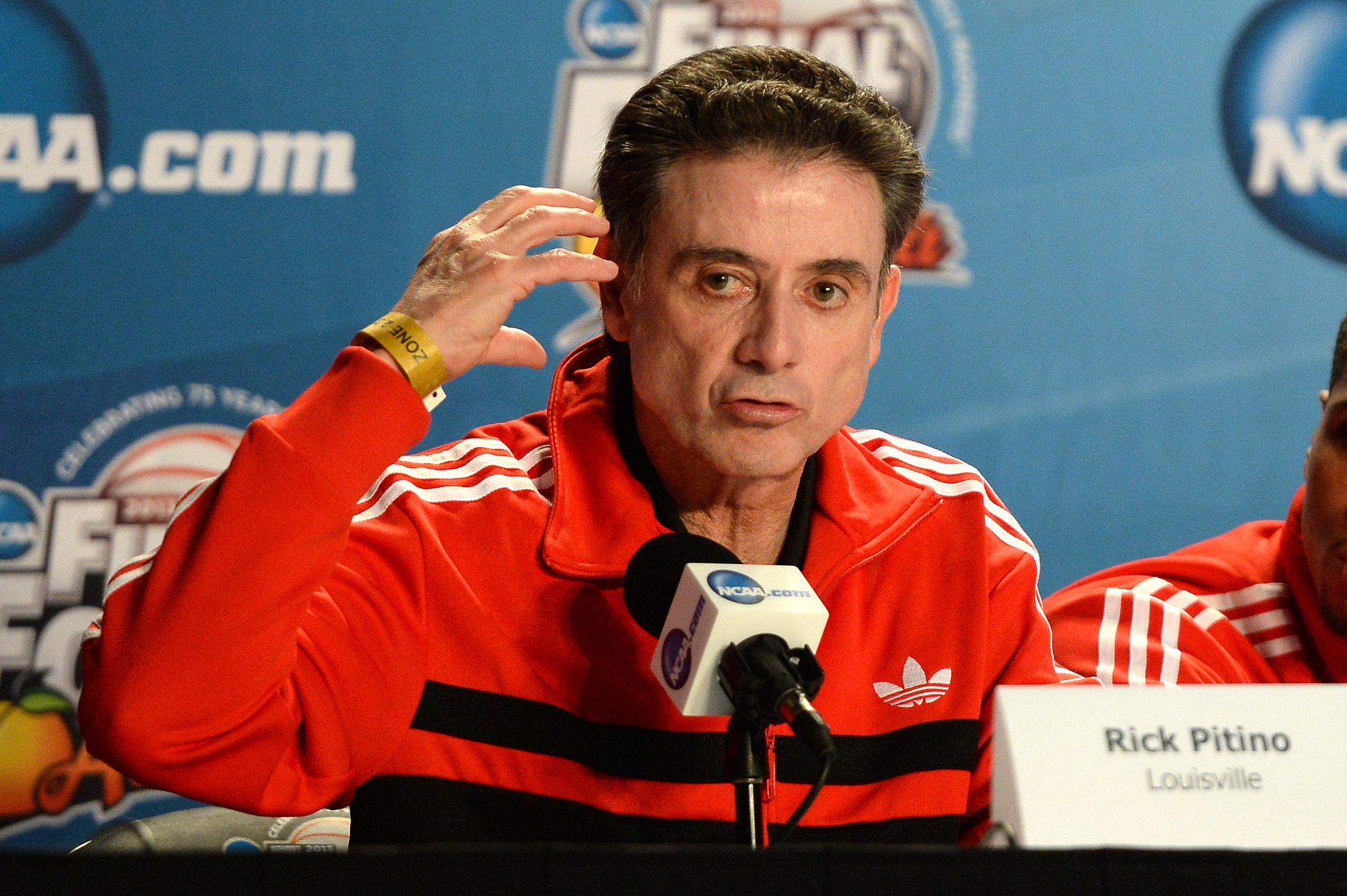
Rick Pitino, Louisville, 2009

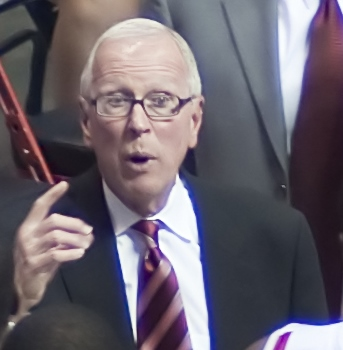
Steve Fisher, San Diego State, 2011

Season	Coach	School	W	L	W %	Finish	Reference
2003–04	Phil Martelli	Saint Joseph's	30	2	.938	NCAA Elite Eight	
2004–05	Bruce Weber	Illinois	37	2	.949	NCAA runners-up	
2005–06	Roy Williams	North Carolina	23	8	.742	NCAA second round	
2006–07	Bo Ryan	Wisconsin	30	6	.833	NCAA second round	
2007–08	Bruce Pearl	Tennessee	31	5	.861	NCAA Sweet Sixteen	
2008–09	Rick Pitino	Louisville	31	6	.838	NCAA Elite Eight	
2009–10	John Calipari	Kentucky	35	3	.921	NCAA Elite Eight	
2010–11	Steve Fisher	San Diego State	34	3	.919	NCAA Sweet Sixteen	
2011–12	Bill Self	Kansas	32	7	.821	NCAA runners-up	
2012–13	Jim Larrañaga	Miami (Florida)	29	7	.806	NCAA Sweet Sixteen	
2013–14	Gregg Marshall	Wichita State	35	1	.972	NCAA round of 32^{[a]}	
2014–15	John Calipari (2)	Kentucky	38	1	.974	NCAA Final Four	

- ^{a} The NCAA men's tournament expanded to 68 teams starting in 2011, with the last four teams earning bids into the tournament set in competition with one another via "First Four" play-in games. The 'second round' then became more commonly referred to as 'round of 32' for specificity.

== See also ==
- Adolph Rupp Trophy – an award that was given annually to the nation's top NCAA Division I men's basketball player from 1971 to 2015
