= 1996–97 Xavier Musketeers men's basketball team =

American college basketball season

1996–97 Xavier Musketeers men's basketball

Atlantic 10 Regular Season co-champions

NCAA tournament, second round
- Conference: Atlantic 10 Conference

Ranking
- Coaches: No. 22
- AP: No. 13
- Record: 23–6 (13–3 A10)
- Head coach: Skip Prosser (3rd season)
- Home arena: Cincinnati Gardens

1996–97 Atlantic 10 men's basketball standings
	Conf.				Overall
Team	W		L	PCT	W		L	PCT
East
No. 12 Saint Joseph's †	13	–	3	.813	26	–	7	.788
Rhode Island	12	–	4	.750	20	–	10	.667
UMass	11	–	5	.688	19	–	14	.576
Temple	10	–	6	.625	20	–	11	.645
St. Bonaventure	5	–	11	.313	14	–	14	.500
Fordham	1	–	15	.063	6	–	21	.222
West
No. 13 Xavier	13	–	3	.813	23	–	6	.793
George Washington	8	–	8	.500	15	–	14	.517
Virginia Tech	7	–	9	.438	15	–	16	.484
Dayton	6	–	10	.375	13	–	14	.481
La Salle	5	–	11	.313	10	–	17	.370
Duquesne	5	–	11	.313	9	–	18	.333
† 1997 Atlantic 10 Tournament winner Rankings from AP Poll

The 1996–97 Xavier Musketeers men's basketball team represented Xavier University from Cincinnati, Ohio in the 1996–97 season. Led by head coach Skip Prosser, the Musketeers finished 23–6 (13–3 A-10) in the regular season, but lost in the quarterfinal round of the Atlantic 10 tournament. In the NCAA tournament, the Musketeers defeated Vanderbilt in the first round before losing to No. 2 seed UCLA, 96–83, in the round of 32.

== Roster ==
1996–97 Xavier Musketeers men's basketball team
Players
Coaches

Pos.	#	Name	Height	Weight	Year	Hometown
G	4	Lenny Brown	6 ft 2 in (1.88 m)	190 lb (86 kg)	So	Wilmington, Delaware
G	12	Gary Lumpkin	6 ft 2 in (1.88 m)	—	So	New Castle, Delaware
F	41	James Posey	6 ft 8 in (2.03 m)	210 lb (95 kg)	So	Cleveland, Ohio
C	50	Torraye Braggs	6 ft 8 in (2.03 m)	235 lb (107 kg)	Jr	Fresno, California

Head coach

- Skip Prosser

Assistant coach(es)

Legend

- (C) Team captain
- (S) Suspended
- (I) Ineligible
- (W) Walk-on
- Injured
- Current redshirt

== Schedule and results ==
Date time, TV	Rank^{#}	Opponent^{#}	Result	Record	Site city, state
Regular season
Nov 23, 1996*		Western Kentucky	W 98–73	1–0	Cincinnati Gardens; Cincinnati, OH
Nov 26, 1996*		at No. 1 Cincinnati; Crosstown Shootout	W 71–69	2–0	Myrl H. Shoemaker Center; Cincinnati, OH
Nov 30, 1996*		Miami (OH)	W 92–71	3–0	Cincinnati Gardens; Cincinnati, OH
Dec 2, 1996*	No. 23	Florida A&M	W 95–64	4–0	Cincinnati Gardens; Cincinnati, OH
Dec 5, 1996*	No. 23	at Loyola Marymount	W 81–65	5–0	Gersten Pavilion; Los Angeles, CA
Dec 10, 1996*	No. 19	at LIU Brooklyn	W 94–86	6–0	Schwartz Athletic Center; Brooklyn, NY
Dec 14, 1996*	No. 19	Hofstra	W 79–43	7–0	Cincinnati Gardens; Cincinnati, OH
Dec 21, 1996*	No. 17	at Akron	W 113–111 ^{3OT}	8–0	James A. Rhodes Arena; Akron, OH
Dec 29, 1996*	No. 17	Kansas State	W 95–54	9–0	Cincinnati Gardens; Cincinnati, OH
Jan 4, 1997*	No. 17	Virginia Tech	W 102–67	10–0 (1–0)	Cincinnati Gardens; Cincinnati, OH
Jan 7, 1997	No. 12	at Dayton	L 91–98	10–1 (1–1)	UD Arena; Dayton, OH
Jan 11, 1997	No. 12	Fordham	W 75–64	11–1 (2–1)	Cincinnati Gardens; Cincinnati, OH
Jan 16, 1997*	No. 14	Tulane	L 85–87	11–2	Cincinnati Gardens; Cincinnati, OH
Jan 19, 1997	No. 14	Temple	W 68–64 ^{OT}	12–2 (3–1)	Cincinnati Gardens; Cincinnati, OH
Jan 23, 1997*	No. 16	George Washington	W 62–61	13–2 (4–1)	Charles E. Smith Center; Washington, D.C.
Jan 25, 1997	No. 16	Duquesne	L 70–78	13–3 (4–2)	Cincinnati Gardens; Cincinnati, OH
Jan 28, 1997	No. 20	Rhode Island	W 91–79	14–3 (5–2)	Cincinnati Gardens; Cincinnati, OH
Feb 1, 1997	No. 20	at UMass	W 87–84 ^{OT}	15–3 (6–2)	Mullins Center; Amherst, MA
Feb 3, 1997	No. 17	at La Salle	W 83–67	16–3 (7–2)	Spectrum; Philadelphia, PA
Feb 8, 1997	No. 17	at Saint Joseph's	L 65–79	16–4 (7–3)	Alumni Memorial Fieldhouse; Philadelphia, PA
Feb 12, 1997	No. 19	Dayton	W 79–53	17–4 (8–3)	Cincinnati Gardens; Cincinnati, OH
Feb 15, 1997	No. 19	George Washington	W 87–76	18–4 (9–3)	Cincinnati Gardens; Cincinnati, OH
Feb 20, 1997	No. 16	at Duquesne	W 82–74	19–4 (10–3)	A.J. Palumbo Center; Pittsburgh, PA
Feb 22, 1997	No. 16	La Salle	W 79–67	11–3	Cincinnati Gardens (20–4); Cincinnati, OH
Feb 27, 1997	No. 14	St. Bonaventure	W 83–59	21–4 (12–3)	Cincinnati Gardens; Cincinnati, OH
Mar 2, 1997	No. 14	at Virginia Tech	W 81–72	22–4 (13–3)	Cassell Coliseum; Blacksburg, VA
Atlantic 10 Tournament
Mar 6, 1997*	No. 11	vs. Temple; Quarterfinals	L 62–69 ^{OT}	22–5	Spectrum; Philadelphia, PA
NCAA Tournament
Mar 13, 1997*	(7 MW) No. 13	vs. (10 MW) Vanderbilt; First Round	W 80–68	23–5	Palace of Auburn Hills; Auburn Hills, MI
Mar 15, 1997*	(7 MW) No. 13	vs. (2 MW) No. 7 UCLA; Second Round	L 83–96	23–6	Palace of Auburn Hills; Auburn Hills, MI
*Non-conference game. ^{#}Rankings from AP poll. (#) Tournament seedings in parentheses. MW=Midwest.
