= 1996–97 NCAA Division I men's basketball season =

Basketball season

- Preseason AP No. 1: Cincinnati Bearcats
- Regular season: November 1996 – March 1997
- NCAA Tournament: 1997
- Tournament dates: March 13 – 31, 1997
- National Championship: RCA Dome; Indianapolis, Indiana
- NCAA Champions: Arizona Wildcats
- Other champions: Michigan Wolverines (Vacated) (NIT)
- Player of the Year (Naismith, Wooden): Tim Duncan, Wake Forest Demon Deacons

The 1996–97 NCAA Division I men's basketball season began in November 1996 and concluded in the 64-team 1997 NCAA Division I men's basketball tournament, whose finals were held at the RCA Dome in Indianapolis, Indiana. The Arizona Wildcats earned their first national championship by defeating the Kentucky Wildcats 84–79 on March 31, 1997. They were coached by Lute Olson, and the NCAA basketball tournament Most Outstanding Player was Arizona's Miles Simon.

In the 32-team 1997 National Invitation Tournament, the Michigan Wolverines defeated the Florida State Seminoles at Madison Square Garden in New York City. Michigan later vacated the 1997 NIT title after the NCAA ruled that players Robert Traylor and Louis Bullock were ineligible.

Following the season, the 1997 NCAA Men's Basketball All-American Consensus First Team included Tim Duncan, Danny Fortson, Raef LaFrentz, Ron Mercer, and Keith Van Horn.

== Season headlines ==
- The Big 12 Conference began play, with 12 original members.
- Prior to the season, the North Atlantic Conference renamed itself the America East Conference.
- Lute Olsen led the Arizona Wildcats to its first national championship.

== Pre-season polls ==
The top 25 from the pre-season AP Poll.

Associated Press
Ranking	Team
1	Cincinnati
2	Kansas
3	Kentucky
4	Wake Forest
5	UCLA
6	Utah
7	Villanova
8	North Carolina
9	Michigan
10	Duke
11	Iowa State
12	Syracuse
13	Arkansas
14	Fresno State
15	Massachusetts
16	Texas
17	New Mexico
18	Stanford
19	Arizona
20	Clemson
21	Boston College
22	Minnesota
23	Iowa
24	George Washington
25	Marquette

== Conference membership changes ==
These schools joined new conferences for the 1996–97 season.

School	Former conference	New conference
Baylor Bears	Southwest Conference	Big 12 Conference
Boise State Broncos	Big Sky Conference	Big West Conference
Cal Poly Mustangs	American West Conference	Big West Conference
Cal State Northridge Matadors	American West Conference	Big Sky Conference
Colorado Buffaloes	Big Eight Conference	Big 12 Conference
Eastern Illinois Panthers	Mid-Continent Conference	Ohio Valley Conference
Houston Cougars	Southwest Conference	Conference USA
Idaho Vandals	Big Sky Conference	Big West Conference
Iowa State Cyclones	Big Eight Conference	Big 12 Conference
Kansas Jayhawks	Big Eight Conference	Big 12 Conference
Kansas State Wildcats	Big Eight Conference	Big 12 Conference
Missouri Tigers	Big Eight Conference	Big 12 Conference
Nebraska Cornhuskers	Big Eight Conference	Big 12 Conference
Nevada–Las Vegas (UNLV) Runnin' Rebels	Big West Conference	Western Athletic Conference
North Texas Mean Green	Southland Conference	Big West Conference
Oklahoma Sooners	Big Eight Conference	Big 12 Conference
Oklahoma State Cowboys	Big Eight Conference	Big 12 Conference
Portland State Vikings	Pacific West Conference (D-II)	Big Sky Conference
Rice Owls	Southwest Conference	Western Athletic Conference
Sacramento State Hornets	American West Conference	Big Sky Conference
San Jose State Spartans	Big West Conference	Western Athletic Conference
SMU Mustangs	Southwest Conference	Western Athletic Conference
Southern Utah Thunderbirds	American West Conference	NCAA Division I Independent
TCU Horned Frogs	Southwest Conference	Western Athletic Conference
Texas Longhorns	Southwest Conference	Big 12 Conference
Texas A&M Aggies	Southwest Conference	Big 12 Conference
Texas Tech Red Raiders	Southwest Conference	Big 12 Conference
Tulsa Golden Hurricane	Missouri Valley Conference	Western Athletic Conference

== Regular season ==
=== Conferences ===
==== Conference winners and tournaments ====
Twenty-seven conferences concluded their seasons with a single-elimination tournament, with only the Big Ten Conference, Ivy League, and Pac-10 Conference choosing not to conduct conference tournaments. Conference tournament winners received an automatic bid to the 1997 NCAA Division I men's basketball tournament.

Conference	Regular season winner	Conference player of the year	Conference tournament	Tournament venue (City)	Tournament winner
America East Conference	Boston University	Tunji Awojobi, Boston University	1997 America East men's basketball tournament	Case Gym (Boston, Massachusetts)	Boston University
Atlantic 10 Conference	St. Joseph's (East); Xavier (West)	Marc Jackson, Temple	1997 Atlantic 10 men's basketball tournament	The Spectrum (Philadelphia, Pennsylvania)	St. Joseph's
Atlantic Coast Conference	Duke	Tim Duncan, Wake Forest	1997 ACC men's basketball tournament	Greensboro Coliseum (Greensboro, North Carolina)	North Carolina
Big 12 Conference	Kansas	Raef LaFrentz, Kansas	1997 Big 12 men's basketball tournament	Kemper Arena (Kansas City, Missouri)	Kansas
Big East Conference	Boston College & Villanova (Big East 6); Georgetown (Big East 7)	Pat Garrity, Notre Dame	1997 Big East men's basketball tournament	Madison Square Garden (New York City, New York)	Boston College
Big Sky Conference	Northern Arizona	Charles Thomas, Northern Arizona	1997 Big Sky Conference men's basketball tournament	Walkup Skydome (Flagstaff, Arizona)	Montana
Big South Conference	UNC Asheville	Josh Pittman, UNC Asheville	1997 Big South Conference men's basketball tournament	Vines Center (Lynchburg, Virginia)	Charleston Southern
Big Ten Conference	Minnesota (Vacated)	Bobby Jackson, Minnesota (Vacated)	No Tournament		
Big West Conference	Pacific (Western); Nevada (Eastern)	Faron Hand, Nevada	1997 Big West Conference men's basketball tournament	Lawlor Events Center (Reno, Nevada)	Pacific
Colonial Athletic Association	Old Dominion	Odell Hodge, Old Dominion	1997 CAA men's basketball tournament	Richmond Coliseum (Richmond, Virginia)	Old Dominion
Conference USA	Cincinnati	Danny Fortson, Cincinnati	1997 Conference USA men's basketball tournament	Kiel Center (St. Louis, Missouri)	Marquette
Ivy League	Princeton	Sydney Johnson, Princeton	No Tournament		
Metro Atlantic Athletic Conference	Iona	Mindaugas Timinskas, Iona	1997 MAAC men's basketball tournament	Marine Midland Arena (Buffalo, New York)	Fairfield
Mid-American Conference	Bowling Green; Miami (OH)	Antonio Daniels, Bowling Green	1997 MAC men's basketball tournament	SeaGate Convention Centre (Toledo, Ohio)	Miami (OH)
Mid-Continent Conference	Valparaiso	Bryce Drew, Valparaiso	1997 Mid-Continent Conference men's basketball tournament	The MARK of the Quad Cities (Moline, Illinois)	Valparaiso
Mid-Eastern Athletic Conference	Coppin State	Roderick Blakney, South Carolina State	1997 MEAC men's basketball tournament	Richmond Coliseum (Richmond, Virginia)	Coppin State
Midwestern Collegiate Conference	Butler	Jon Neuhouser, Butler	1997 MCC men's basketball tournament	Nutter Center (Dayton, Ohio)	Butler
Missouri Valley Conference	Illinois State	Jason Daisy, Northern Iowa	1997 Missouri Valley Conference men's basketball tournament	Kiel Center (St. Louis, Missouri)	Illinois State
Northeast Conference	Long Island	Charles Jones, Long Island	1997 Northeast Conference men's basketball tournament	Schwartz Athletic Center (Brooklyn, New York)	Long Island
Ohio Valley Conference	Austin Peay; Murray State	Bubba Wells, Austin Peay	1997 Ohio Valley Conference men's basketball tournament	Gaylord Entertainment Center (Nashville, Tennessee) (Semifinals and Finals)	Murray State
Pacific-10 Conference	UCLA	Ed Gray, California	No Tournament		
Patriot League	Navy	Adonal Foyle, Colgate	1997 Patriot League men's basketball tournament	Alumni Hall (Annapolis, Maryland)	Navy
Southeastern Conference	South Carolina (East); Ole Miss (West)	Ron Mercer, Kentucky	1997 SEC men's basketball tournament	Pyramid Arena (Memphis, Tennessee)	Kentucky
Southern Conference	Marshall (North); Chattanooga (South)	Johnny Taylor, Chattanooga	1997 Southern Conference men's basketball tournament	Greensboro Coliseum (Greensboro, North Carolina)	Chattanooga
Southland Conference	Texas State	Rosell Ellis, McNeese State	1997 Southland Conference men's basketball tournament	Hirsch Memorial Coliseum (Shreveport, Louisiana)	Texas State
Southwestern Athletic Conference	Mississippi Valley State	Randy Bolden, Texas Southern	1997 SWAC men's basketball tournament	—	Jackson State
Sun Belt Conference	South Alabama	Muntrelle Dobbins, Little Rock	1997 Sun Belt men's basketball tournament	Barton Coliseum (Little Rock, Arkansas)	South Alabama
Trans America Athletic Conference	College of Charleston	Anthony Johnson, College of Charleston	1997 TAAC men's basketball tournament	John Kresse Arena (Charleston, South Carolina)	College of Charleston
West Coast Conference	St. Mary's; Santa Clara	Marlon Garnett, Santa Clara	1997 West Coast Conference men's basketball tournament	Gersten Pavilion (Los Angeles, California)	St. Mary's
Western Athletic Conference	Fresno State (Pacific); Utah (Mountain)	Anthony Carter, Hawaii; Keith Van Horn, Utah	1997 WAC men's basketball tournament	Thomas & Mack Center (Las Vegas, Nevada)	Utah

==== Conference standings ====
1996–97 America East Conference men's basketball standings
	Conf.				Overall
Team	W		L	PCT	W		L	PCT
Boston University †	17	–	1	.944	25	–	5	.833
Drexel	16	–	2	.889	22	–	9	.710
Hartford	11	–	7	.611	17	–	11	.607
Hofstra	9	–	9	.500	12	–	15	.444
Delaware	9	–	9	.500	12	–	15	.444
Vermont	7	–	11	.389	14	–	13	.519
Northeastern	6	–	12	.333	7	–	20	.259
Maine	6	–	12	.333	11	–	20	.355
New Hampshire	5	–	13	.278	7	–	20	.259
Towson State	5	–	13	.278	9	–	19	.321
† 1997 America East tournament winner Rankings from AP poll

1996–97 ACC men's basketball standings
	Conf.				Overall
Team	W		L	PCT	W		L	PCT
No. 8 Duke	12	–	4	.750	24	–	9	.727
No. 9 Wake Forest	11	–	5	.688	24	–	7	.774
No. 4 North Carolina †	11	–	5	.688	28	–	7	.800
No. 14 Clemson	9	–	7	.563	23	–	10	.697
No. 22 Maryland	9	–	7	.563	21	–	11	.656
Virginia	7	–	9	.438	18	–	13	.581
Florida State	6	–	10	.375	20	–	12	.625
NC State	4	–	12	.250	17	–	15	.531
Georgia Tech	3	–	13	.188	9	–	18	.333
† 1997 ACC tournament winner Rankings from AP poll

1996–97 Atlantic 10 men's basketball standings
	Conf.				Overall
Team	W		L	PCT	W		L	PCT
East
No. 12 Saint Joseph's †	13	–	3	.813	26	–	7	.788
Rhode Island	12	–	4	.750	20	–	10	.667
UMass	11	–	5	.688	19	–	14	.576
Temple	10	–	6	.625	20	–	11	.645
St. Bonaventure	5	–	11	.313	14	–	14	.500
Fordham	1	–	15	.063	6	–	21	.222
West
No. 13 Xavier	13	–	3	.813	23	–	6	.793
George Washington	8	–	8	.500	15	–	14	.517
Virginia Tech	7	–	9	.438	15	–	16	.484
Dayton	6	–	10	.375	13	–	14	.481
La Salle	5	–	11	.313	10	–	17	.370
Duquesne	5	–	11	.313	9	–	18	.333
† 1997 Atlantic 10 Tournament winner Rankings from AP Poll

1996–97 Big 12 men's basketball standings
	Conf.				Overall
Team	W		L	PCT	W		L	PCT
No. 1 Kansas †	15	–	1	.938	34	–	2	.944
No. 24 Colorado	11	–	5	.688	22	–	10	.688
Texas	10	–	6	.625	18	–	12	.600
No. 18 Iowa State	10	–	6	.625	22	–	9	.710
Texas Tech	10	–	6	.625	19	–	9	.679
Oklahoma	9	–	7	.563	19	–	11	.633
Nebraska	7	–	9	.438	18	–	15	.545
Oklahoma State	7	–	9	.438	17	–	15	.531
Baylor	6	–	10	.375	18	–	12	.600
Missouri	5	–	11	.313	16	–	17	.485
Texas A&M	3	–	13	.188	9	–	18	.333
Kansas State	3	–	13	.188	10	–	17	.370
† 1997 Big 12 Tournament winner Rankings from AP poll

1996–97 Big East men's basketball standings
	Conf.				Overall
Team	W		L	PCT	W		L	PCT
Big East 6
No. 20 Villanova	12	–	6	.667	24	–	10	.706
No. 23 Boston College†	12	–	6	.667	22	–	9	.710
West Virginia	11	–	7	.611	21	–	10	.677
Notre Dame	8	–	10	.444	16	–	14	.533
St. John's	8	–	10	.444	13	–	15	.464
Connecticut	7	–	11	.389	18	–	15	.545
Big East 7
Georgetown	11	–	7	.611	20	–	10	.667
Providence	10	–	8	.556	24	–	12	.667
Pittsburgh	10	–	8	.556	18	–	15	.545
Miami	9	–	9	.500	16	–	13	.552
Syracuse	9	–	9	.500	19	–	13	.594
Seton Hall	5	–	13	.278	10	–	18	.357
Rutgers	5	–	13	.278	11	–	16	.407
† 1997 Big East tournament winner As of March 31, 1997; Rankings from AP poll

1996–97 Big Sky men's basketball standings
	Conf.				Overall
Team	W		L	PCT	W		L	PCT
Northern Arizona	14	–	2	.875	21	–	7	.750
Montana †	11	–	5	.688	21	–	11	.656
Montana State	10	–	6	.625	16	–	14	.533
Weber State	9	–	7	.563	15	–	13	.536
Idaho State	9	–	7	.563	14	–	13	.519
Cal State Northridge	8	–	8	.500	14	–	15	.483
Portland State	6	–	10	.375	9	–	17	.346
Eastern Washington	3	–	13	.188	7	–	19	.269
Sacramento State	2	–	14	.125	3	–	23	.115
† Conference tournament winner

1996–97 Big South Conference men's basketball standings
	Conf.				Overall
Team	W		L	PCT	W		L	PCT
UNC Asheville	11	–	3	.786	18	–	10	.643
Liberty	11	–	3	.786	23	–	9	.719
Radford	8	–	6	.571	15	–	13	.536
Charleston Southern †	7	–	7	.500	17	–	13	.567
Coastal Carolina	6	–	8	.429	11	–	16	.407
UNC Greensboro	6	–	8	.429	10	–	20	.333
Winthrop	5	–	9	.357	12	–	15	.444
UMBC	2	–	12	.143	5	–	22	.185
† 1997 Big South tournament winner Rankings from AP Poll

1996–97 Big Ten Conference men's basketball standings
	Conf.				Overall
Team	W		L	PCT	W		L	PCT
Iowa	12	–	6	.667	22	–	10	.688
Purdue	12	–	6	.667	18	–	12	.600
No. 19 Illinois	11	–	7	.611	22	–	10	.688
Wisconsin	11	–	7	.611	18	–	10	.643
Indiana	9	–	9	.500	22	–	11	.667
Michigan State	9	–	9	.500	17	–	12	.586
Ohio State	5	–	13	.278	10	–	17	.370
Penn State	3	–	15	.167	10	–	17	.370
Northwestern	2	–	16	.111	7	–	22	.241
No. 3 Minnesota*	0	–	2	.000	0	–	4	.000
Michigan*	0	–	9	.000	0	–	11	.000
Rankings from AP Poll; *Michigan: 24 games vacated; including NIT champ. vacated due to sanctions against the program *Minnesota: 5 NCAA Tournament games vacated due to sanctions against the program Disputed records: Michigan-(24–11)(9–9); Minnesota-(31–4)(16–2)

1996–97 Big West men's basketball standings
	Conf.				Overall
Team	W		L	PCT	W		L	PCT
East Division
Utah State	12	–	4	.750	20	–	9	.690
New Mexico State	12	–	4	.750	19	–	9	.679
Nevada	12	–	4	.750	21	–	10	.677
Boise State	9	–	7	.563	14	–	13	.519
Idaho	5	–	11	.313	13	–	17	.433
North Texas	5	–	11	.313	10	–	16	.385
West Division
Pacific †	12	–	4	.750	24	–	6	.800
Long Beach State	9	–	7	.563	13	–	14	.481
UC Santa Barbara	7	–	9	.438	12	–	15	.444
Cal State Fullerton	6	–	10	.375	13	–	14	.481
Cal Poly	6	–	10	.375	14	–	16	.467
UC Irvine	1	–	15	.063	1	–	25	.038
† 1997 Big West tournament winner As of April 1, 1997; Rankings from AP poll

1996–97 CAA men's basketball standings
	Conf.				Overall
Team	W		L	PCT	W		L	PCT
Old Dominion †	10	–	6	.625	22	–	11	.667
UNC Wilmington	10	–	6	.625	16	–	14	.533
East Carolina	9	–	7	.563	17	–	10	.630
VCU	9	–	7	.563	14	–	13	.519
William & Mary	8	–	8	.500	12	–	16	.429
James Madison	8	–	8	.500	16	–	13	.552
American	7	–	9	.438	11	–	16	.407
Richmond	7	–	9	.438	13	–	15	.464
George Mason	4	–	12	.250	10	–	17	.370
† 1997 CAA tournament winner Rankings from AP poll

1996–97 Conference USA men's basketball standings
	Conf.				Overall
Team	W		L	PCT	W		L	PCT
Blue
No. 10 Cincinnati	12	–	2	.857	26	–	8	.765
Marquette †	9	–	5	.643	22	–	9	.710
Saint Louis	4	–	10	.286	11	–	18	.379
DePaul	1	–	13	.071	3	–	23	.115
Red
Tulane	11	–	3	.786	20	–	11	.645
UAB	7	–	7	.500	18	–	14	.563
Southern Miss	6	–	8	.429	12	–	15	.444
South Florida	2	–	12	.143	8	–	19	.296
White
UNC Charlotte	10	–	4	.714	22	–	9	.710
Memphis	10	–	4	.714	16	–	15	.516
No. 25 Louisville	9	–	5	.643	26	–	9	.743
Houston	3	–	11	.214	11	–	16	.407
† 1997 Conference USA Tournament winner Rankings from AP Poll

1996–97 Ivy League men's basketball standings
	Conf.				Overall
Team	W		L	PCT	W		L	PCT
Princeton	14	–	0	1.000	24	–	4	.857
Dartmouth	10	–	4	.714	18	–	8	.692
Harvard	10	–	4	.714	17	–	9	.654
Penn	8	–	6	.571	12	–	14	.462
Cornell	7	–	7	.500	15	–	11	.577
Yale	3	–	11	.214	10	–	16	.385
Brown	3	–	11	.214	4	–	22	.154
Columbia	1	–	13	.071	6	–	20	.231
Rankings from AP Poll

1996–97 MAAC men's basketball standings
	Conf.				Overall
Team	W		L	PCT	W		L	PCT
Iona	11	–	3	.786	22	–	8	.733
Canisius	10	–	4	.714	17	–	12	.586
Loyola (MD)	10	–	4	.714	13	–	14	.481
Saint Peter's	9	–	5	.643	13	–	15	.464
Manhattan	5	–	9	.357	9	–	18	.333
Niagara	5	–	9	.357	11	–	17	.393
Siena	4	–	10	.286	9	–	18	.333
Fairfield †	2	–	12	.143	11	–	19	.367
† 1997 MAAC tournament winner

1996–97 Mid-American Conference men's basketball standings
	Conf.				Overall
Team	W		L	PCT	W		L	PCT
Bowling Green	13	–	5	.722	22	–	10	.688
Miami†	13	–	5	.722	21	–	9	.700
Ohio	12	–	6	.667	17	–	10	.630
Eastern Michigan	11	–	7	.611	22	–	10	.688
Ball State	9	–	9	.500	16	–	13	.552
Western Michigan	9	–	9	.500	14	–	14	.500
Kent State	7	–	11	.389	9	–	18	.333
Toledo	6	–	12	.333	13	–	14	.481
Akron	6	–	12	.333	8	–	18	.308
Central Michigan	4	–	14	.222	7	–	19	.269
† 1997 MAC tournament winner Rankings from AP Poll

1996–97 Mid-Continent Conference men's basketball standings
	Conf.				Overall
Team	W		L	PCT	W		L	PCT
Valparaiso †	13	–	5	.722	24	–	7	.774
Buffalo	11	–	5	.688	17	–	11	.607
Western Illinois	11	–	5	.688	19	–	10	.655
Troy State	10	–	6	.625	16	–	11	.593
Northeastern Illinois	8	–	8	.500	16	–	12	.571
Missouri–Kansas City	7	–	9	.438	10	–	17	.370
Youngstown State	4	–	12	.250	9	–	18	.333
Chicago State	4	–	12	.250	4	–	23	.148
Central Connecticut State	4	–	12	.250	8	–	19	.296
† 1997 Mid-Con Tournament winner Rankings from AP Poll

1996–97 MEAC men's basketball standings
	Conf.				Overall
Team	W		L	PCT	W		L	PCT
Coppin State †	15	–	3	.833	22	–	9	.710
South Carolina State	12	–	6	.667	14	–	14	.500
North Carolina A&T	11	–	7	.611	15	–	13	.536
Bethune–Cookman	9	–	9	.500	12	–	16	.429
Morgan State	8	–	10	.444	9	–	18	.333
Florida A&M	8	–	10	.444	8	–	19	.296
Hampton	7	–	11	.389	8	–	19	.296
Delaware State	7	–	11	.389	7	–	20	.259
Howard	7	–	11	.389	7	–	20	.259
Maryland Eastern Shore	6	–	12	.333	11	–	17	.393
† 1997 MEAC tournament winner Rankings from AP Poll

1996–97 Midwestern Collegiate Conference men's basketball standings
	Conf.				Overall
Team	W		L	PCT	W		L	PCT
Butler †	12	–	4	.750	23	–	10	.697
Detroit Mercy	11	–	5	.688	16	–	13	.552
Illinois-Chicago	11	–	5	.688	15	–	14	.517
Wisconsin–Green Bay	10	–	6	.625	14	–	14	.500
Loyola–Chicago	7	–	9	.438	12	–	15	.444
Northern Illinois	6	–	10	.375	12	–	15	.444
Cleveland State	6	–	10	.375	9	–	19	.321
Wright State	5	–	11	.313	7	–	20	.259
Wisconsin–Milwaukee	4	–	12	.250	8	–	20	.286
† 1997 MCC tournament winner

1996–97 Missouri Valley Conference men's basketball standings
	Conf.				Overall
Team	W		L	PCT	W		L	PCT
Illinois State †	14	–	4	.778	24	–	6	.800
Bradley	12	–	6	.667	17	–	13	.567
Southwest Missouri State	12	–	6	.667	24	–	9	.727
Northern Iowa	11	–	7	.611	16	–	12	.571
Evansville	11	–	7	.611	17	–	14	.548
Creighton	10	–	8	.556	15	–	15	.500
Wichita State	8	–	10	.444	14	–	13	.519
Southern Illinois	6	–	12	.333	13	–	17	.433
Indiana State	6	–	12	.333	12	–	16	.429
Drake	0	–	18	.000	2	–	26	.071
† 1997 MVC tournament winner Rankings from AP Poll

1996–97 Northeast Conference men's basketball standings
	Conf.				Overall
Team	W		L	PCT	W		L	PCT
Long Island†	15	–	3	.833	21	–	9	.700
Fairleigh Dickinson	13	–	5	.722	18	–	10	.643
Monmouth	12	–	6	.667	18	–	11	.621
Rider	10	–	8	.556	14	–	14	.500
Mount St. Mary's	10	–	8	.556	14	–	13	.519
Saint Francis (PA)	9	–	9	.500	12	–	15	.444
St. Francis Brooklyn	7	–	11	.389	13	–	15	.464
Wagner	7	–	11	.389	10	–	17	.370
Marist	4	–	14	.222	6	–	22	.214
Robert Morris	3	–	15	.167	4	–	23	.148
† 1997 NEC tournament winner

1996–97 Ohio Valley Conference men's basketball standings
	Conf.				Overall
Team	W		L	PCT	W		L	PCT
Austin Peay	12	–	6	.667	17	–	14	.548
Murray State †	12	–	6	.667	20	–	10	.667
Middle Tennessee	11	–	7	.611	19	–	12	.613
Tennessee Tech	10	–	8	.556	15	–	13	.536
Eastern Illinois	9	–	9	.500	12	–	15	.444
Southeast Missouri State	9	–	9	.500	12	–	18	.400
UT Martin	8	–	10	.444	11	–	16	.407
Tennessee State	7	–	11	.389	9	–	18	.333
Morehead State	6	–	12	.333	8	–	19	.296
Eastern Kentucky	6	–	12	.333	8	–	18	.308
† 1997 OVC tournament winner Rankings from AP Poll

1996–97 Pacific-10 Conference men's basketball standings
	Conf.				Overall
Team	W		L	PCT	W		L	PCT
No. 7 UCLA	15	–	3	.833	24	–	8	.750
No. 21 Stanford	12	–	6	.667	22	–	8	.733
California	12	–	6	.667	23	–	9	.719
USC	12	–	6	.667	17	–	11	.607
No. 15 Arizona	11	–	7	.611	25	–	9	.735
Washington	10	–	8	.556	17	–	11	.607
Oregon	8	–	10	.444	17	–	11	.607
Washington State	5	–	13	.278	13	–	17	.433
Oregon State	3	–	15	.167	7	–	20	.259
Arizona State	2	–	16	.111	10	–	20	.333
Rankings from AP Poll

1996–97 Patriot League men's basketball standings
	Conf.				Overall
Team	W		L	PCT	W		L	PCT
Navy †	10	–	2	.833	20	–	9	.690
Bucknell	9	–	3	.750	18	–	11	.621
Colgate	8	–	4	.667	12	–	16	.429
Holy Cross	5	–	7	.417	8	–	19	.296
Lafayette	5	–	7	.417	11	–	17	.393
Army	4	–	8	.333	10	–	16	.385
Lehigh	1	–	11	.083	1	–	26	.037
† 1997 Patriot League tournament winner

1996–97 Southeastern Conference men's basketball standings
	Conf.				Overall
Team	W		L	PCT	W		L	PCT
East
No. 6 South Carolina	15	–	1	.938	24	–	8	.750
No. 5 Kentucky†	13	–	3	.813	35	–	5	.875
No. 17 Georgia	10	–	6	.625	24	–	9	.727
Vanderbilt	9	–	7	.563	19	–	12	.613
Florida	5	–	11	.313	13	–	17	.433
Tennessee	4	–	12	.250	11	–	16	.407
West
Ole Miss	11	–	5	.688	20	–	9	.690
Arkansas	8	–	8	.500	18	–	14	.563
Auburn	6	–	10	.375	16	–	15	.516
Alabama	6	–	10	.375	17	–	14	.548
Mississippi State	6	–	10	.375	12	–	18	.400
LSU	3	–	13	.188	10	–	20	.333
† 1997 SEC tournament winner Rankings from AP Poll

1996–97 Southern Conference men's basketball standings
	Conf.				Overall
Team	W		L	PCT	W		L	PCT
North
Marshall	10	–	4	.714	20	–	9	.690
Davidson	10	–	4	.714	18	–	10	.643
Appalachian State	8	–	6	.571	14	–	14	.500
VMI	7	–	7	.500	12	–	16	.429
East Tennessee State	2	–	12	.143	7	–	20	.259
South
Chattanooga†	11	–	3	.786	24	–	11	.686
Western Carolina	7	–	7	.500	14	–	13	.519
The Citadel	6	–	8	.429	13	–	14	.481
Georgia Southern	5	–	9	.357	10	–	18	.357
Furman	4	–	10	.286	10	–	17	.370
† SoCon Tournament winner As of April 30, 1997; Rankings from AP poll

1996–97 Southland Conference men's basketball standings
	Conf.				Overall
Team	W		L	PCT	W		L	PCT
McNeese State	10	–	6	.625	18	–	12	.600
Southwest Texas State †	10	–	6	.625	16	–	13	.552
Northeast Louisiana	10	–	6	.625	14	–	14	.500
Northwestern State	8	–	8	.500	13	–	15	.464
Stephen F. Austin	8	–	8	.500	12	–	15	.444
Texas-Arlington	8	–	8	.500	12	–	15	.444
Nicholls State	7	–	9	.438	10	–	16	.385
Sam Houston State	7	–	9	.438	8	–	18	.308
UTSA	4	–	12	.250	9	–	17	.346
† 1997 Southland tournament winner Rankings from AP Poll

1996–97 SWAC men's basketball standings
	Conf.				Overall
Team	W		L	PCT	W		L	PCT
Mississippi Valley State	11	–	3	.786	19	–	10	.655
Jackson State †	9	–	5	.643	14	–	16	.467
Alcorn State	8	–	6	.571	11	–	17	.393
Prairie View A&M	7	–	7	.500	10	–	17	.370
Texas Southern	6	–	8	.429	12	–	16	.429
Grambling	5	–	9	.357	10	–	17	.370
Alabama State	5	–	9	.357	8	–	21	.276
Southern	5	–	9	.357	10	–	17	.370
† 1997 SWAC tournament winner Rankings from AP Poll

1996–97 Sun Belt Conference men's basketball standings
	Conf.				Overall
Team	W		L	PCT	W		L	PCT
New Orleans	14	–	4	.778	22	–	7	.759
South Alabama †	14	–	4	.778	23	–	7	.767
Arkansas–Little Rock	11	–	7	.611	18	–	11	.621
Lamar	10	–	8	.556	15	–	12	.556
Louisiana Tech	10	–	8	.556	15	–	14	.517
Western Kentucky	9	–	9	.500	12	–	15	.444
Southwestern Louisiana	9	–	9	.500	12	–	16	.429
Arkansas State	8	–	10	.444	15	–	12	.556
Jacksonville	4	–	14	.222	5	–	23	.179
Texas–Pan American	1	–	17	.056	3	–	25	.107
† 1997 Sun Belt Conference tournament winner Rankings from AP Poll

1996–97 Trans America Athletic Conference men's basketball standings
	Conf.				Overall
Team	W		L	PCT	W		L	PCT
East
No. 16 College of Charleston†	16	–	0	1.000	29	–	3	.906
Florida International	12	–	4	.750	16	–	13	.552
Florida Atlantic	11	–	5	.688	16	–	11	.593
Campbell	8	–	8	.500	11	–	16	.407
Stetson	5	–	11	.313	9	–	18	.333
Central Florida	4	–	12	.250	7	–	19	.269
West
Samford	11	–	5	.688	19	–	9	.679
Jacksonville State	9	–	7	.563	10	–	17	.370
Southeastern Louisiana	7	–	9	.438	10	–	18	.357
Georgia State	6	–	10	.375	10	–	17	.370
Centenary	6	–	10	.375	9	–	18	.333
Mercer	1	–	15	.063	3	–	23	.115
† 1997 TAAC tournament winner Rankings from AP poll

1996–97 West Coast Conference men's basketball standings
	Conf.				Overall
Team	W		L	PCT	W		L	PCT
Santa Clara	10	–	4	.714	16	–	11	.593
Saint Mary's †	10	–	4	.714	23	–	8	.742
San Francisco	9	–	5	.643	16	–	13	.552
San Diego	8	–	6	.571	17	–	11	.607
Gonzaga	8	–	6	.571	15	–	12	.556
Portland	4	–	10	.286	9	–	18	.333
Pepperdine	4	–	10	.286	6	–	21	.222
Loyola Marymount	3	–	11	.214	7	–	21	.250
† 1997 WCC tournament winner Rankings from AP poll

1996–97 WAC men's basketball standings
	Conf.				Overall
Team	W		L	PCT	W		L	PCT
Mountain
No. 2 Utah †	15	–	1	.938	29	–	4	.879
Tulsa	12	–	4	.750	24	–	10	.706
No. 11 New Mexico	11	–	5	.688	25	–	8	.758
TCU	7	–	9	.438	22	–	13	.629
SMU	7	–	9	.438	16	–	12	.571
Rice	6	–	10	.375	12	–	15	.444
UTEP	6	–	10	.375	13	–	13	.500
BYU	0	–	16	.000	1	–	25	.038
Pacific
Fresno State	12	–	4	.750	20	–	12	.625
Hawaii	12	–	4	.750	21	–	8	.724
UNLV	11	–	5	.688	22	–	10	.688
Colorado State	10	–	6	.625	20	–	9	.690
Wyoming	8	–	8	.500	12	–	16	.429
San Jose State	5	–	11	.313	13	–	14	.481
San Diego State	4	–	12	.250	12	–	15	.444
Air Force	2	–	14	.125	7	–	19	.269
† 1997 WAC tournament winner Rankings from AP poll

=== Division I independents ===
Three schools played as Division I independents. One (Oral Roberts) received a bid to the 1997 National Invitation Tournament.

1996–97 NCAA Division I men's basketball independents standings
	Conf.				Overall
Team	W		L	PCT	W		L	PCT
Oral Roberts	-	–	-	–	21	–	7	.750
Southern Utah	-	–	-	–	9	–	17	.346
Wofford	-	–	-	–	7	–	20	.259
Rankings from AP Poll

=== Informal championships ===
Conference	Regular season winner	Most Valuable Player
Philadelphia Big 5	Temple & Villanova	Rashid Bey, Saint Joseph's, & Alvin Williams, Villanova

For the sixth consecutive season, the Philadelphia Big 5 did not play a full round-robin schedule in which each team met each other team once, a format it had used from its first season of competition in 1955–56 through the 1990–91 season. Instead, each team played only two games against other Big 5 members, and Temple and Villanova both finished with 2–0 records in head-to-head competition among the Big 5. The Big 5 did not revive its full round-robin schedule until the 1999–2000 season.

=== Statistical leaders ===
Source for additional stats categories

Points per game			Rebounds per game			Assists per game			Steals per game		
Player	School	PPG	Player	School	RPG	Player	School	APG	Player	School	SPG
Charles Jones	Long Island	30.1	Tim Duncan	Wake Forest	14.7	Kenny Mitchell	Dartmouth	7.8	Joel Hoover	Maryland Eastern Shore	3.2
Ed Gray	California	24.8	Adonal Foyle	Colgate	13.1	Brevin Knight	Stanford	7.8	Philip Huyler	Florida Atlantic	3.2
Adonal Foyle	Colgate	24.4	Lorenzo Coleman	Tennessee Tech	11.9	Kareem Gilbert	Tennessee State	7.6	Kellii Taylor	Pittsburgh	3.2
Raymond Tutt	UC Santa Barbara	24.0	Tony Battie	Texas Tech	11.8	Jamar Smiley	Illinois State	7.3	Moe Segar	St. Peter's	3.1
Antonio Daniels	Bowling Green	24.0	Muntrelle Dobbins	Little Rock	11.4	Chad Peckinpaugh	Eastern Illinois	7.3	Mustafa Barksdale	Monmouth	3.0

Blocked shots per game			Field-goal percentage			Three-Point FG percentage			Free-throw percentage		
Player	School	BPG	Player	School	FG%	Player	School	3FG%	Player	School	FT%
Adonal Foyle	Colgate	6.4	Todd MacCulloch	Washington	.676	Corey Reed	Radford	.476	Aaron Zobrist	Lamar	.906
Lorenzo Coleman	Tennessee Tech	4.8	Sean Scott	Central Connecticut	.670	D. J. Bosse	Kent State	.475	Keith Van Horn	Utah	.904
Richard Lugo	St. Francis (NY)	4.5	Rosell Ellis	McNeese State	.668	Louis Bullock	Michigan	.472	Jim Williamson	Loyola Marymount	.902
Jerome James	Florida A&M	4.4	Ed Sears	Ohio	.647	Andrew Mavis	Northern Arizona	.471	Marcus Wilson	Evansville	.901
Kelvin Cato	Iowa State	4.2	Lorenzo Coleman	Tennessee Tech	.645	Bryce Drew	Valparaiso	.457	Trajan Langdon	Duke	.897

== Post-season tournaments ==
=== NCAA tournament ===
==== Final Four – RCA Dome, Indianapolis, Indiana ====
National semifinals
E1	North Carolina	58
SE4	Arizona	66
M1	Minnesota	69
W1	Kentucky	78

National championship game
SE4	Arizona	84*
W1	Kentucky	79

=== National Invitation tournament ===
==== Semifinals & finals ====
Semifinals
Florida State	71
Connecticut	65
Michigan	77
Arkansas	62

Finals
Florida State	73
Michigan*	82
Third place
Connecticut	74
Arkansas	64

* Michigan later forfeited its entire 1996–97 schedule after players Robert Traylor, Maurice Taylor, and Louis Bullock were found to have taken money from a Michigan booster.

== Award winners ==
=== Consensus All-American teams ===
Consensus First Team
Player	Position	Class	Team
Tim Duncan	C	Senior	Wake Forest
Danny Fortson	F	Junior	Cincinnati
Raef LaFrentz	C	Junior	Kansas
Ron Mercer	F	Sophomore	Kentucky
Keith Van Horn	F	Senior	Utah

Consensus Second Team
Player	Position	Class	Team
Chauncey Billups	G	Sophomore	Colorado
Bobby Jackson	G	Senior	Minnesota
Antawn Jamison	F	Sophomore	North Carolina
Brevin Knight	G	Senior	Stanford
Jacque Vaughn	G	Senior	Kansas

=== Major player of the year awards ===
- Wooden Award: Tim Duncan, Wake Forest
- Naismith Award: Tim Duncan, Wake Forest
- Associated Press Player of the Year: Tim Duncan, Wake Forest
- NABC Player of the Year: Tim Duncan, Wake Forest
- Oscar Robertson Trophy (USBWA): Tim Duncan, Wake Forest
- Adolph Rupp Trophy: Tim Duncan, Wake Forest
- Sporting News Player of the Year: Tim Duncan, Wake Forest
- Chip Hilton Player of the Year Award: Tim Duncan, Wake Forest

=== Major freshman of the year awards ===
- USBWA Freshman of the Year: No Award Given
- Sporting News Freshman of the Year: No Award Given

=== Major coach of the year awards ===
- Associated Press Coach of the Year: Clem Haskins, Minnesota (Vacated)
- Henry Iba Award (USBWA): Clem Haskins, Minnesota (Vacated)
- NABC Coach of the Year: Clem Haskins, Minnesota (Vacated)
- Naismith College Coach of the Year: Roy Williams, Kansas
- Sporting News Coach of the Year: Roy Williams, Kansas
- Clair Bee Coach of the Year Award: Clem Haskins, Minnesota (Vacated)

=== Other major awards ===
- NABC Defensive Player of the Year: Tim Duncan, Wake Forest
- Frances Pomeroy Naismith Award (Best player under 6'0): Brevin Knight, Stanford
- Robert V. Geasey Trophy (Top player in Philadelphia Big 5): Rashid Bey, Saint Joseph's & Alvin Williams, Villanova
- NIT/Haggerty Award (Top player in New York City metro area): Charles Jones, Long Island
- Chip Hilton Player of the Year Award (Strong personal character): Tim Duncan, Wake Forest

== Coaching changes ==
A number of teams changed coaches during the season and after it ended.

Team	Former Coach	Interim Coach	New Coach	Reason
American	Chris Knoche		Art Perry	
Army	Dino Gaudio		Pat Harris	Gaudio left to coach Loyola (MD).
Bethune–Cookman	Tony Sheals		Horace Broadnax	
Boston College	Jim O'Brien		Al Skinner	O'Brien left to coach Ohio State.
Bowling Green	Jim Larrañaga		Dan Dakich	Larrañaga left to coach George Mason. Dakich was hire from the Indiana coaching staff.
BYU	Roger Reid	Tony Ingle	Steve Cleveland	Reid was dismissed citing multiple reasons being; not getting a talented recruit, giving scholarships to his sons, and starting the season 1–6. Assistant coach Ingle took over as interim for the rest of the season, finishing the season 1–25, the Cougars worst record in history.
Canisius	John Beilein		Mike MacDonald	
Central Michigan	Leonard Drake		Jay Smith	
Chattanooga	Mack McCarthy		Henry Dickerson	McCarthy left to be an associate head coach at VCU. Dickerson was promoted from associate head coach.
Colgate	Jack Bruen		Paul Aiello	Bruen was diagnosed with cancer before the start of the season.
Delaware State	Art Perry		Jimmy DuBose	Perry left after one season to take over his alma mater, American.
DePaul	Joey Meyer		Pat Kennedy	
Eastern Kentucky	Mike Calhoun		Scott Perry	Perry was an assistant with the Michigan coaching staff.
Florida State	Pat Kennedy		Steve Robinson	Kennedy left to coach DePaul.
Furman	Joe Cantafio		Larry Davis	Cantafio resigned after three straight season of 10–17. Davis was hired from the Minnesota coaching staff.
George Mason	Paul Westhead		Jim Larrañaga	Westhead left to join the Golden State Warriors coaching staff.
Georgia	Tubby Smith		Ron Jirsa	Smith left to coach Kentucky
Georgia State	Carter Wilson		Lefty Driesell	
Gonzaga	Dan Fitzgerald		Dan Monson	Monson was promoted from assistant.
Hampton	Byron Samuels		Steve Merfeld	Merfeld was promoted to head coach.
Idaho	Kermit Davis		David Farrar	Davis left his second stint after one season to serve as an assistant on the LSU coaching staff. Farrar was promoted to head coach after Davis left.
Indiana State	Sherman Dillard		Royce Waltman	Dillard left to coach his alma mater, James Madison.
Jacksonville	George Scholz	Buster Harvey	Hugh Durham	Scholz was relieved of his duties in the middle of the season after starting 0–6. Harvey took over on an interim basis, going 5–17 for the rest of the season. Durham came out of retirement to become head coach.
James Madison	Lefty Driesell		Sherman Dillard	Driesell left to coach Georgia State.
Kentucky	Rick Pitino		Tubby Smith	Pitino left to coach the Boston Celtics.
Loyola (MD)	Brian Ellerbe		Dino Gaudio	Ellerbe left to coach Michigan.
Loyola Marymount	John Olive		Charles Bradley	
LSU	Dale Brown		John Brady	Brown retired.
Memphis	Larry Finch		Tic Price	Finch's remaining years on his contract were bought out.
Mercer	Bill Hodges		Mark Slonaker	
Michigan	Steve Fisher		Brian Ellerbe	
Morehead State	Dick Fick		Kyle Macy	
New Mexico State	Neil McCarthy		Lou Henson	McCarthy was fired before the start of the 1997–98. Henson was hired on an interim basis.
New Orleans	Tic Price		Joey Stiebing	Price left to coach Memphis. Stiebing was promoted from assistant.
North Carolina	Dean Smith		Bill Guthridge	Smith retired a month before the 1997–98 season forcing North Carolina to promote assistant Guthridge to head coach.
North Texas	Tim Jankovich		Vic Trilli	
Northwestern	Ricky Byrdsong		Kevin O'Neill	
Ohio State	Randy Ayers		Jim O'Brien	
Oral Roberts	Bill Self		Barry Hinson	Self left to coach Tulsa.
Oregon	Jerry Green		Ernie Kent	Green left to coach Tennessee.
Rhode Island	Al Skinner		Jim Harrick	Skinner left to coach Boston College.
Richmond	Bill Dooley		John Beilein	
Rider	Kevin Bannon		Don Harnum	Bannon left to coach Rutgers.
Rutgers	Bob Wenzel		Kevin Bannon	Wenzel was relieved of his duties at the end of the season.
Sacramento State	Don Newman		Tom Abatemarco	
Saint Mary's	Ernie Kent		Dave Bollwinkel	Kent left to coach Oregon.
Samford	John Brady		Jimmy Tillette	Brady left to coach LSU. Tillette was promoted to head coach.
Seton Hall	George Blaney		Tommy Amaker	Amaker was hired from the Duke coaching staff.
Siena	Bob Beyer		Paul Hewitt	Beyer left to be an assistant at Northwestern. Hewitt was hired from the Villanova coaching staff.
South Alabama	Bill Musselman		Bob Weltlich	Musselman left to join the Portland Trail Blazers coaching staff.
Southeast Missouri State	Ron Shumate		Gary Garner	
Southwestern Louisiana	Marty Fletcher		Jessie Evans	Fletcher left to coach Denver. Evans was hired from Arizona coaching staff.
Stetson	Randy Brown		Murray Arnold	
Tennessee	Kevin O'Neill		Jerry Green	O'Neill left to coach Northwestern.
Texas–Pan American	Mark Adams		Delray Brooks	Brooks was hired from the Kentucky coaching staff.
Towson State	Terry Truax		Mike Jaskulski	
Tulsa	Steve Robinson		Bill Self	
Virginia Tech	Bill Foster		Bobby Hussey	Hussey was promoted to head coach.
Western Kentucky	Matt Kilcullen	Ron Brown & Al Siebert	Dennis Felton	Kilcullen was fired in the middle of the season after a start of 7–16. Brown and Siebert were both named interim coaches to finish the season 3–3. Felton was hired from the Clemson coaching staff.
Wright State	Jim Brown		Ed Schilling	Schilling was hired from the New Jersey Nets coaching staff.
Wyoming	Joby Wright		Larry Shyatt	Wright resigned. Shyatt was hired from the Clemson coaching staff.
