= John Griffin (basketball) =

American basketball player and coach

Biographical details
- Born: May 17, 1956 (age 70)

Playing career
- 1974–1978: Saint Joseph's

Coaching career (HC unless noted)
- 1980–1982: Saint Joseph's (asst.)
- 1982–1986: Siena
- 1990–1995: Saint Joseph's

Head coaching record
- Overall: 145–113 (.562)

Accomplishments and honors

Awards
- ECAC North Coach of the Year (1985)

John Griffin (May 17, 1956) is an American former college basketball player and coach at Saint Joseph's and Siena.

== Coaching career ==
After playing for the Hawks from 1974 to 1978, Griffin returned as an assistant coach in 1980, staying for two seasons before taking the head coaching job at Siena. In four seasons at Siena, Griffin compiled a 70–44 record and earned ECAC North Coach of the Year honors in 1985. After leaving Siena in 1986 to enter the private sector, Griffin returned to coaching by taking the helm of his alma mater for five seasons, amassing a 75–69 record and two NIT appearances before being replaced by his assistant, Phil Martelli.

== Personal life ==
Both of Griffin's sons played college basketball and are also current coaches. Son John played basketball at Bucknell and is the current head coach of the men’s team at the school. Griffin's other son Matt played at Rider and Boston University and recently became assistant coach, joining his brother at Bucknell after a stint at University of Albany after 5 years as the head boys basketball coach at Roman Catholic High School in Philadelphia.

== Head coaching record ==
Record table
Season	Team	Overall	Conference	Standing	Postseason
Siena Saints (ECAC North) (1982–1986)
1982–83	Siena	12–16	6–8	5th	
1983–84	Siena	15–13	8–8	T–5th	
1984–85	Siena	22–7	12–4	3rd	
1985–86	Siena	21–8	12–6	4th	
Siena:		70–44 (.614)	38–26 (.594)		
Saint Joseph's Hawks (Atlantic 10 Conference) (1990–1995)
1990–91	Saint Joseph's	13–17	7–11	8th	
1991–92	Saint Joseph's	13–15	6–10	T–6th	
1992–93	Saint Joseph's	18–11	8–6	T–2nd	NIT First Round
1993–94	Saint Joseph's	14–14	5–11	8th	
1994–95	Saint Joseph's	17–12	9–7	T–4th	NIT First Round
Saint Joseph's:		75–69 (.521)	35–45 (.438)		
Total:		217–226 (.490)			
