= Rashid Atkins =

American basketball player

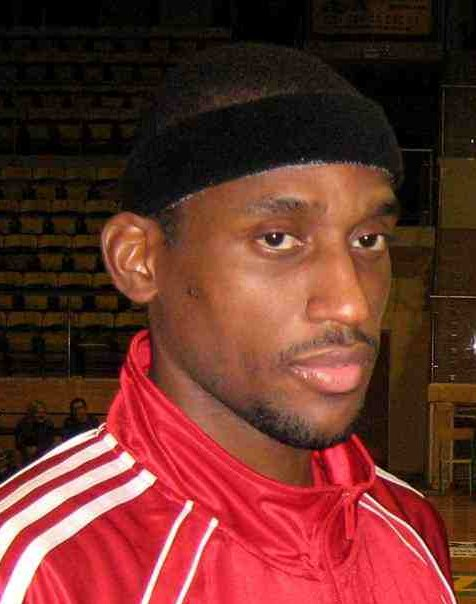
- Rashid Atkins

Personal information
- Born: May 14, 1975 (age 51) Philadelphia, Pennsylvania, U.S.
- Listed height: 6 ft 0 in (1.83 m)
- Listed weight: 154 lb (70 kg)

Career information
- High school: Saint John Neumann (Philadelphia, Pennsylvania)
- College: St. Joseph's (1994–1998)
- NBA draft: 1998: undrafted
- Playing career: 1998–2010
- Position: Point guard

Career history
- 1998–2000: Inter Bratislava
- 2000–2001: Spójnia Stargard
- 2001–2002: Lugano Snakes
- 2002: Spójnia Stargard
- 2002: JDA Dijon
- 2002–2003: Tekelspor
- 2003–2004: Haifa/Nesher
- 2004–2005: Bandırma Banvit
- 2006–2007: Prokom Trefl Sopot
- 2007–2008: Śląsk Wrocław
- 2008: Oostende
- 2008–2009: Galatasaray
- 2010: APOEL

Career highlights
- 2× PLK champion (2006, 2007); Polish Cup winner (2006); First-team All-Atlantic 10 (1997); Second-team All-Atlantic 10 (1998); 2× Robert V. Geasey Trophy winner (1997, 1998)

Rashid Sultan Atkins (born May 14, 1975) is an American former professional basketball player. Atkins played collegiately at Saint Joseph's University in Philadelphia from 1994 to 1998 under the name Rashid Bey.
