= 2002–03 Mid-American Conference men's basketball season =

- League: NCAA Division I
- Sport: Basketball
- Teams: 13

Regular season
- League champions: Central Michigan
- Runners-up: Kent State
- Season MVP: Chris Kaman

Tournament
- Champions: Central Michigan
- Runners-up: Kent State
- Finals MVP: Chris Kaman

Mid-American men's basketball seasons
- ← 2001–02 2003–04 →

2002–03 Mid-American Conference men's basketball standings
	Conf.				Overall
Team	W		L	PCT	W		L	PCT
East
Kent State	12	–	6	.667	21	–	10	.677
Miami (OH)	11	–	7	.611	13	–	15	.464
Akron	9	–	9	.500	14	–	14	.500
Marshall	9	–	9	.500	14	–	15	.483
Ohio	8	–	10	.444	14	–	16	.467
Buffalo	2	–	16	.111	5	–	23	.179
West
Central Michigan †	14	–	4	.778	25	–	7	.781
Northern Illinois	11	–	7	.611	17	–	14	.548
Western Michigan	10	–	8	.556	20	–	11	.645
Eastern Michigan	8	–	10	.444	14	–	14	.500
Bowling Green	8	–	10	.444	13	–	16	.448
Ball State	8	–	10	.444	13	–	17	.433
Toledo	7	–	11	.389	14	–	15	.483
† 2003 MAC tournament winner Rankings from AP Poll

The 2002–03 Mid-American Conference men's basketball season began with practices in October 2002, followed by the start of the 2002–03 NCAA Division I men's basketball season in November. Conference play began in January 2003 and concluded in March 2003. Central Michigan won the regular season title with a conference record of 14–4 by two games over second-place Kent State. Central Michigan defeated Kent State in the MAC tournament final and represented the MAC in the NCAA tournament. There they defeated Creighton in the first round before losing to Duke.

== Preseason awards ==
The preseason poll was announced by the league office on October 24, 2002.

=== Preseason men's basketball poll ===
(First place votes in parentheses)

==== East Division ====
1. Ohio (22) 199
2. Miami (5) 166
3. Kent State (7) 155
4. Marshall (1) 94
5. Akron (1) 89
6. Buffalo 58

==== West Division ====
1. Ball State (33) 249
2. Western Michigan 191
3. Toledo (3) 155
4. Northern Illinois 126
5. Bowling Green 117
6. Central Michigan 113
7. Eastern Michigan 50

=== Honors ===
Honor	Recipient
Preseason All-MAC East	Brandon Hunter, Ohio
Preseason All-MAC East	Antonio Gates, Kent State
Preseason All-MAC East	Andy Hipsher, Akron
Preseason All-MAC East	Ronald Blackshear, Marshall
Preseason All-MAC East	Juby Johnson, Miami
Preseason All-MAC West	Theron Smith, Ball State
Preseason All-MAC West	Chris Kaman, Central Michigan
Preseason All-MAC West	Ricky Cottrill, Eastern Michigan
Preseason All-MAC West	Nick Moore, Toledo
Preseason All-MAC West	Robby Collum, Western Michigan

== Postseason ==
=== Postseason awards ===
1. Coach of the Year: Jay Smith, Central Michigan
2. Player of the Year: Chris Kaman, Central Michigan
3. Freshman of the Year: Sammy Villegas, Toledo
4. Defensive Player of the Year: Chris Kaman, Central Michigan
5. Sixth Man of the Year: Whitney Robinson, Central Michigan

=== Honors ===
Honor	Recipient
Postseason All-MAC First Team	Chris Williams, Ball State
Postseason All-MAC First Team	Chris Kaman, Central Michigan
Postseason All-MAC First Team	Antonio Gates, Kent State
Postseason All-MAC First Team	Marcus Smallwood, Northern Illinois
Postseason All-MAC First Team	Brandon Hunter, Ohio
Postseason All-MAC Second Team	Derrick Tarver, Akron
Postseason All-MAC Second Team	Mike Manciel, Central Michigan
Postseason All-MAC Second Team	Ryan Prillman, Eastern Michigan
Postseason All-MAC Second Team	Ronald Blackshear, Marshall
Postseason All-MAC Second Team	Juby Johnson, Miami
Postseason All-MAC Honorable Mention	Johnny Hollingsworth, Akron
Postseason All-MAC Honorable Mention	Kevin Netter, Bowling Green
Postseason All-MAC Honorable Mention	Turner Battle, Buffalo
Postseason All-MAC Honorable Mention	J.R. Wallace, Central Michigan
Postseason All-MAC Honorable Mention	Eric Haut, Miami
Postseason All-MAC Honorable Mention	P.J. Smith, Northern Illinois
Postseason All-MAC Honorable Mention	Nick Moore, Toledo
Postseason All-MAC Honorable Mention	Keith Triplett, Toledo
Postseason All-MAC Honorable Mention	Robby Collum, Western Michigan
Postseason All-MAC Honorable Mention	Anthony Kann, Western Michigan
All-MAC Freshman Team	Sammy Villegas, Toledo
All-MAC Freshman Team	Ron Lewis, Bowling Green
All-MAC Freshman Team	Josh Hausfeld, Miami
All-MAC Freshman Team	DeAndre Haynes, Kent State
All-MAC Freshman Team	Todd Peterson, Northern Illinois

== See also ==
2002–03 Mid-American Conference women's basketball season
