= 2003 MAC men's basketball tournament =

- Classification: Division I
- Season: 2002–03
- Teams: 13
- Site: Gund Arena; Cleveland, Ohio
- Champions: Central Michigan (2nd title)
- Winning coach: Jay Smith (1st title)
- MVP: Chris Kaman (Central Michigan)
- MAC men's basketball tournaments

2002–03 Mid-American Conference men's basketball standings
	Conf.				Overall
Team	W		L	PCT	W		L	PCT
East
Kent State	12	–	6	.667	21	–	10	.677
Miami (OH)	11	–	7	.611	13	–	15	.464
Akron	9	–	9	.500	14	–	14	.500
Marshall	9	–	9	.500	14	–	15	.483
Ohio	8	–	10	.444	14	–	16	.467
Buffalo	2	–	16	.111	5	–	23	.179
West
Central Michigan †	14	–	4	.778	25	–	7	.781
Northern Illinois	11	–	7	.611	17	–	14	.548
Western Michigan	10	–	8	.556	20	–	11	.645
Eastern Michigan	8	–	10	.444	14	–	14	.500
Bowling Green	8	–	10	.444	13	–	16	.448
Ball State	8	–	10	.444	13	–	17	.433
Toledo	7	–	11	.389	14	–	15	.483
† 2003 MAC tournament winner Rankings from AP Poll

The 2003 MAC men's basketball tournament, a part of the 2002–03 NCAA Division I men's basketball season, took place from March 10–15 at Gund Arena in Cleveland. Its winner received the Mid-American Conference's automatic bid to the 2003 NCAA tournament. It was a single-elimination tournament with four rounds and the three highest seeds received byes in the first round. All MAC teams were invited to participate. Central Michigan, the MAC regular season winner, received the number one seed in the tournament. Central Michigan defeated Kent State in the final. In the NCAA tournament they defeated Creighton in the first round before losing to Duke.

== Tournament ==
=== Seeds ===
1. Central Michigan
2. Kent State
3. Miami
4. Northern Illinois
5. Western Michigan
6. Akron
7. Marshall
8. Ball State
9. Bowling Green
10. Eastern Michigan
11. Ohio
12. Toledo
13. Buffalo

=== Bracket ===
First round March 10, 2003
8	Ball State	81
9	Bowling Green	90
4	Northern Illinois	81
13	Buffalo	64
5	Western Michigan	78
12	Toledo	64
7	Marshall	83
10	Eastern Michigan	75
6	Akron	77
11	Ohio	79

Quarterfinals; March 13, 2003
1	Central Michigan	87
9	Bowling Green	70
4	Northern Illinois	75
5	Western Michigan	63
2	Kent State	79
7	Marshall	57
3	Miami (OH)	55^{OT}
11	Ohio	65

Semifinals; March 14, 2003
1	Central Michigan	94
4	Northern Illinois	72
2	Kent State	73
11	Ohio	70

Championship; March 15, 2003
1	Central Michigan	77
2	Kent State	72
