= Central Michigan Chippewas men's basketball statistical leaders =

The Central Michigan Chippewas men's basketball statistical leaders are individual statistical leaders of the Central Michigan Chippewas men's basketball program in various categories, including points, rebounds, assists, steals, and blocks. Within those areas, the lists identify single-game, single-season, and career leaders. The Chippewas represent Central Michigan University in the NCAA's Mid-American Conference.

Central Michigan began competing in intercollegiate basketball in 1904. However, the school's record book does not generally list records from before the 1950s, as records from before this period are often incomplete and inconsistent. Since scoring was much lower in this era, and teams played much fewer games during a typical season, it is likely that few or no players from this era would appear on these lists anyway.

The NCAA did not officially record assists as a stat until the 1983–84 season, and blocks and steals until the 1985–86 season, but Central Michigan's record books includes players in these stats before these seasons. These lists are updated through the end of the 2020–21 season.

== Scoring ==
Career
Rk	Player	Points	Seasons
1	Mel McLaughlin	2,071	1979–80 1980–81 1981–82 1982–83
2	Dan Majerle	2,055	1984–85 1985–86 1986–87 1987–88
3	Braylon Rayson	1,885	2013–14 2014–15 2015–16 2016–17
4	David Webber	1,774	1998–99 1999–00 2000–01 2001–02
5	Giordan Watson	1,763	2004–05 2005–06 2006–07 2007–08
6	Chris Fowler	1,736	2012–13 2013–14 2014–15 2015–16
7	Ben Kelso	1,627	1970–71 1971–72 1972–73
8	David DiLeo	1,604	2016–17 2017–18 2018–19 2019–20
9	Don Edwards	1,402	1962–63 1963–64 1964–65 1965–66
10	Mike Manciel	1,399	1998–99 2000–01 2001–02 2002–03

Season
Rk	Player	Points	Season
1	Marcus Keene	959	2016–17
2	Dan Majerle	759	1987–88
3	Chris Kaman	694	2002–03
4	Braylon Rayson	679	2016–17
5	Ben Kelso	661	1971–72
6	Mel McLaughlin	651	1982–83
7	Ben Kelso	620	1972–73
8	Larry Austin Jr.	611	2018–19
9	Tommie Johnson	601	1987–88
10	Giordan Watson	582	2006–07

Single game
Rk	Player	Points	Season	Opponent
1	Tommie Johnson	53	1987–88	Wright State
2	David Webber	51	1999–00	Ball State
3	Marcus Keene	50	2016–17	Miami
4	Ben Kelso	49	1972–73	Marshall
5	Chuck Smith	46	1945–46	Northern Michigan
	Glenn Stuart	46	1954–55	Illinois State
	Mel McLaughlin	46	1982–83	Bowling Green
8	Tommie Johnson	45	1987–88	Ohio State
9	Marcus Keene	44	2016–17	Montana State
	David Webber	44	2001–02	Miami
	Mel McLaughlin	44	1982–83	Kent State
	Mel McLaughlin	44	1981–82	Ball State

== Rebounds ==
Career
Rk	Player	Rebounds	Seasons
1	Dan Roundfield	1,031	1972–73 1973–74 1974–75
2	Dave Nelson	978	1961–62 1962–63 1963–64
3	Ken VanDyke	958	1959–60 1960–61 1961–62
4	Don Edwards	919	1962–63 1963–64 1964–65 1965–66
5	Dan Majerle	834	1984–85 1985–86 1986–87 1987–88
6	John Simons	776	2012–13 2013–14 2014–15 2015–16
7	David DiLeo	733	2016–17 2017–18 2018–19 2019–20
8	Ben Poquette	713	1973–74 1974–75 1975–76 1976–77
9	Chris Kaman	707	2000–01 2001–02 2002–03
10	Kevin McKay	698	2016–17 2017–18 2018–19 2019–20

Season
Rk	Player	Rebounds	Season
1	Chris Kaman	373	2002–03
2	Dan Roundfield	357	1973–74
3	Dan Roundfield	346	1972–73
4	Dan Majerle	346	1987–88
5	Don Edwards	345	1965–66
6	Dan Roundfield	328	1974–75
7	Stan Breidinger	319	1963–64
8	Ben Poquette	309	1976–77
9	Mike Robinson	290	1980–81
10	Nate Huffman	287	1996–97

Single game
Rk	Player	Rebounds	Season	Opponent
1	Dan Roundfield	26	1973–74	New Mexico
	Don Kelly	26	1952–53	Northern Illinois
	Stan Breidinger	26	1963–64	Ohio Northern
4	Dan Roundfield	25	1973–74	Bowling Green
5	Bill Peters	22	1964–65	Northern Michigan
	Chris Kaman	22	2002–03	Ball State
	Brian Taylor	22	2023–24	Eastern Michigan
8	John Berends	21	1964–65	Northern Michigan
	Dan Roundfield	21	1974–75	Western Illinois
	Chris Kaman	21	2002–03	Michigan

== Assists ==
Career
Rk	Player	Assists	Seasons
1	Chris Fowler	686	2012–13 2013–14 2014–15 2015–16
2	Giordan Watson	489	2004–05 2005–06 2006–07 2007–08
3	Derrick Richmond	456	1985–86 1986–87 1987–88 1988–89
4	Dave Grauzer	449	1976–77 1977–78 1978–79
5	Sonny Newman	435	1977–78 1978–79 1979–80 1980–81
6	Tim Kisner	434	1997–98 1998–99 1999–00 2000–01
7	Peter Lambropoulos	371	1982–83 1983–84 1984–85 1985–86
8	Rayshawn Simmons	360	2013–14 2014–15 2015–16
9	Willie Iverson	329	1965–66 1966–67 1967–68
10	Anthony Pritchard	305	2023–24 2024–25

Season
Rk	Player	Assists	Season
1	Larry Austin Jr.	209	2018–19
2	Dave Grauzer	196	1977–78
3	Chris Fowler	194	2014–15
4	Dave Grauzer	178	1978–79
5	Chris Fowler	176	2012–13
6	Derrick Richmond	169	1988–89
	Anthony Pritchard	169	2024–25
8	Rayshawn Simmons	165	2015–16
	Denny Parks	165	1975–76
10	Chris Fowler	163	2013–14

Single game
Rk	Player	Assists	Season	Opponent
1	Derrick Richmond	16	1988–89	Youngstown State
2	Giordan Watson	13	2005–06	Eastern Michigan
	Tim Kisner	13	2000–01	Northern Illinois
	Eric Pickering	13	1968–69	Hillsdale

== Steals ==
Career
Rk	Player	Steals	Seasons
1	Giordan Watson	203	2004–05 2005–06 2006–07 2007–08
2	Mel McLaughlin	196	1979–80 1980–81 1981–82 1982–83
3	Chris Fowler	185	2012–13 2013–14 2014–15 2015–16
4	Dan Majerle	171	1984–85 1985–86 1986–87 1987–88
	Kevin McKay	171	2016–17 2017–18 2018–19 2019–20
6	Jordan Bitzer	169	2006–07 2007–08 2008–09 2009–10
7	Robbie Harman	162	2006–07 2007–08 2008–09 2009–10
8	Tim Kisner	143	1997–98 1998–99 1999–00 2000–01
9	Sonny Newman	142	1977–78 1978–79 1979–80 1980–81
10	Leon Guydon	141	1976–77 1977–78 1978–79 1979–80

Season
Rk	Player	Steals	Season
1	Larry Austin Jr.	78	2018–19
2	Dave Grauzer	63	1978–79
3	Kevin McKay	62	2017–18
	Dave Grauzer	62	1977–78
5	Chris Fowler	60	2013–14
	Anthony Pritchard	60	2024–25
7	Derek Jackson	58	2011–12
	Giordan Watson	58	2007–08
9	Kevin McKay	57	2018–19
10	Robbie Harman	56	2009–10

Single game
Rk	Player	Steals	Season	Opponent
1	Derrick Richmond	8	1988–89	Ohio
	Mel McLaughlin	8	1981–82	Western Michigan
3	Mel McLaughlin	7	1982–83	Kent State
	Chris Fowler	7	2012–13	Michigan Dearborn
	Robbie Harman	7	2009–10	Ferris State

== Blocks ==
Career
Rk	Player	Blocks	Seasons
1	Ben Poquette	234	1973–74 1974–75 1975–76 1976–77
2	Chris Kaman	182	2000–01 2001–02 2002–03
3	Dan Roundfield	175	1972–73 1973–74 1974–75
4	Sefton Barrett	105	2003–04 2004–05 2005–06 2006–07
5	DaRohn Scott	98	2014–15 2015–16 2016–17
6	Dan Majerle	95	1984–85 1985–86 1986–87 1987–88
7	Nate Huffman	92	1995–96 1996–97
8	Charles Macon	90	1995–96 1996–97
9	Luke Meyer	88	2014–15 2015–16 2016–17 2017–18
10	Daryl Miller	84	1985–86 1986–87 1987–88
	Brian Taylor	84	2021–22 2022–23 2023–24

Season
Rk	Player	Blocks	Season
1	Chris Kaman	98	2002–03
2	Ben Poquette	96	1976–77
3	Dan Roundfield	84	1974–75
4	Ben Poquette	68	1975–76
5	Nathan Claerbaut	64	2025–26
6	Dan Roundfield	53	1973–74
7	Nate Huffman	46	1995–96
	Nate Huffman	46	1996–97
9	Chris Kaman	45	2000–01
10	Charles Macon	44	1996–97
	Charles Macon	44	1995–96

Single game
Rk	Player	Blocks	Season	Opponent
1	Nathan Claerbaut	11	2025–26	Western Michigan
2	Dan Roundfield	8	1974–75	Bowling Green
	Dan Roundfield	8	1974–75	Kentucky
	Chris Kaman	8	2002–03	Toledo
5	Dan Roundfield	7	1974–75	Northern Illinois
	Rob DeCook	7	1993–94	Kent State
	Chris Kaman	7	2002–03	Ball State
