= 2002–03 Central Michigan Chippewas men's basketball team =

American college basketball season

2002–03 Central Michigan Chippewas men's basketball

MAC West Division Champions MAC Regular Season Champions MAC tournament champions

NCAA tournament, second round
- Conference: Mid-American Conference
- West
- Record: 25–7 (14–4 MAC)
- Head coach: Jay Smith
- Home arena: Daniel P. Rose Center

2002–03 Mid-American Conference men's basketball standings
	Conf.				Overall
Team	W		L	PCT	W		L	PCT
East
Kent State	12	–	6	.667	21	–	10	.677
Miami (OH)	11	–	7	.611	13	–	15	.464
Akron	9	–	9	.500	14	–	14	.500
Marshall	9	–	9	.500	14	–	15	.483
Ohio	8	–	10	.444	14	–	16	.467
Buffalo	2	–	16	.111	5	–	23	.179
West
Central Michigan †	14	–	4	.778	25	–	7	.781
Northern Illinois	11	–	7	.611	17	–	14	.548
Western Michigan	10	–	8	.556	20	–	11	.645
Eastern Michigan	8	–	10	.444	14	–	14	.500
Bowling Green	8	–	10	.444	13	–	16	.448
Ball State	8	–	10	.444	13	–	17	.433
Toledo	7	–	11	.389	14	–	15	.483
† 2003 MAC tournament winner Rankings from AP Poll

The 2002–03 Central Michigan Chippewas men's basketball team represented Central Michigan University as a member of the Mid-American Conference during the 2002–03 NCAA Division I men's basketball season. The team was led by head coach Jay Smith and played their home games at the Daniel P. Rose Center. After finishing atop the MAC regular season standings, the Chippewas won the MAC tournament to earn an automatic bid to the NCAA tournament as No. 11 seed in the West region. Central Michigan defeated No. 6 seed Creighton in the opening round before losing to No. 3 seed Duke in the Round of 32. The team finished with a record of 25–7 (14–4 MAC).

== Roster ==
2002–03 Central Michigan Chippewas men's basketball team
Players	Coaches
Pos. / # / Name / Height / Weight / Year / Hometown; C / 35 / Chris Kaman / 7 ft 0 in (2.13 m) / 255 lb (116 kg) / Jr / Tri-unity Christian School / Wyoming, Michigan	Head coach: Jay Smith; Assistant coach(es) Legend: (C) Team captain; (S) Suspended; (I) Ineligible; (W) Walk-on; Injured; Current redshirt

== Schedule and results ==
Date time, TV	Rank^{#}	Opponent^{#}	Result	Record	Site city, state
Regular season
Nov 22, 2002*		George Mason	W 61–58	1–0	Rose Arena; Mount Pleasant, Michigan
Nov 26, 2002*		Illinois State	W 74–69	2–0	Rose Arena; Mount Pleasant, Michigan
Nov 30, 2002*		at DePaul	L 56–92	2–1	Allstate Arena; Rosemont, Illinois
Dec 3, 2002*		at Michigan	W 85–78	3–1	Crisler Arena; Ann Arbor, Michigan
Dec 8, 2002*		Drake	W 73–61	4–1	Rose Arena; Mount Pleasant, Michigan
Dec 14, 2002*		at Marist	W 88–66	5–1	McCann Field House; Poughkeepsie, New York
Dec 18, 2002*		at Bradley	W 74–71	6–1	Carver Arena; Peoria, Illinois
Dec 23, 2002*		at Valparaiso	L 51–65	6–2	Athletics-Recreation Center; Valparaiso, Indiana
Dec 30, 2002		Spring Arbor	W 113–63	7–2	Rose Arena; Mount Pleasant, Michigan
Jan 4, 2003		at Miami (OH)	L 62–71	7–3 (0–1)	Millett Hall; Oxford, Ohio
Jan 8, 2003		at Western Michigan	W 80–75	8–3 (1–1)	University Arena; Kalamazoo, Michigan
Jan 11, 2003		Ohio	W 87–84	9–3 (2–1)	Rose Arena; Mount Pleasant, Michigan
Jan 14, 2003		at Marshall	W 81–78	10–3 (3–1)	Cam Henderson Center; Huntington, West Virginia
Jan 18, 2003		Buffalo	W 97–73	11–3 (4–1)	Rose Arena; Mount Pleasant, Michigan
Jan 22, 2003		Ball State	W 83–74	12–3 (5–1)	Mount Pleasant, Michigan
Jan 25, 2003		at Eastern Michigan	L 68–84	12–4 (5–2)	Convocation Center
Jan 29, 2003		at Kent State	L 78–82	12–5 (5–3)	Memorial Athletic and Convocation Center; Kent, Ohio
Feb 1, 2003*		Bowling Green	W 88–71	13–5 (6–3)	Rose Arena; Mount Pleasant, Michigan
Feb 8, 2003		at Akron	W 99–92	14–5 (7–3)	James A. Rhodes Arena; Akron, Ohio
Feb 10, 2003		Western Michigan	W 77–58	15–5 (8–3)	Rose Arena; Mount Pleasant, Michigan
Feb 15, 2003		at Toledo	W 66–64	16–5 (9–3)	John F. Savage Hall; Toledo, Ohio
Feb 19, 2003		Ball State	W 94–92	17–5 (10–3)	Rose Arena; Mount Pleasant, Michigan
Feb 22, 2003		at Northern Illinois	W 87–75	18–5 (11–3)	Convocation Center; DeKalb, Illinois
Feb 25, 2003		Akron	L 69–70	18–6 (11–4)	Rose Arena; Mount Pleasant, Michigan
Mar 1, 2003		Eastern Michigan	W 106–89	19–6 (12–4)	Rose Arena; Mount Pleasant, Michigan
Mar 5, 2003		Northern Illinois	W 73–57	20–6 (13–4)	Rose Arena; Mount Pleasant, Michigan
Mar 8, 2003		at Ball State	W 86–66	21–6 (14–4)	Worthen Arena; Muncie, Indiana
MAC Tournament
Mar 13, 2003*	(1)	vs. (9) Bowling Green; Quarterfinals	W 87–70	22–6	Gund Arena; Cleveland, Ohio
Mar 14, 2003*	(1)	vs. (4) Northern Illinois; Semifinals	W 94–72	23–6	Gund Arena; Cleveland, Ohio
Mar 15, 2003*	(1)	vs. (2) Kent State; Championship Game	W 77–67	24–6	Gund Arena; Cleveland, Ohio
NCAA Tournament
Mar 20, 2003*; CBS	(11 W)	vs. (6 W) No. 15 Creighton; First Round	W 79–73	25–6	Jon M. Huntsman Center; Salt Lake City, Utah
Mar 22, 2003*; CBS	(11 W)	vs. (3 W) No. 7 Duke; Second Round	L 60–86	25–7	Jon M. Huntsman Center; Salt Lake City, Utah
*Non-conference game. ^{#}Rankings from AP poll. (#) Tournament seedings in parentheses.

== Awards and honors ==
- Chris Kaman – MAC Player of the Year, AP Honorable Mention All-American
- Jay Smith – MAC Coach of the Year

== 2003 NBA draft ==
Round	Pick	Player	NBA Team
1	6	Chris Kaman	Los Angeles Clippers
