= Tony Barbee =

American basketball coach (born 1971)

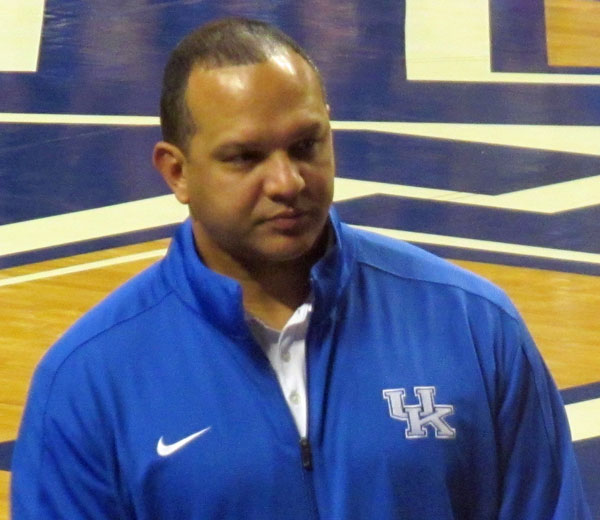
- Barbee at Kentucky's 2015 Blue-White scrimmage

Current position
- Title: Associate head coach
- Team: Murray State
- Conference: MVC

Biographical details
- Born: August 10, 1971 (age 55); Indianapolis, Indiana, U.S.
- Education: University of Massachusetts Amherst (1998)

Playing career
- 1989–1993: UMass

Coaching career (HC unless noted)
- 1995–1998: UMass (GA/assistant)
- 1998–1999: Wyoming (assistant)
- 1999–2000: UMass (assistant)
- 2000–2006: Memphis (assistant)
- 2006–2010: UTEP
- 2010–2014: Auburn
- 2014–2021: Kentucky (assistant)
- 2021–2025: Central Michigan
- 2025–2026: Incarnate Word (assistant)
- 2026–present: Murray State (associate HC)

Head coaching record
- Overall: 166–185 (.473)
- Tournaments: 0–1 (NCAA Division I); 3–2 (CBI)

Accomplishments and honors

Championships
- C-USA regular season (2010)

Awards
- Player: Atlantic 10 All-Freshman team (1990); 2× Second-team All-Atlantic 10 (1991, 1993); Coach: C-USA Coach of the Year (2010); MAC Coach of the Year (2024)

Anthony Michael Barbee (born August 10, 1971) is an American college basketball coach, who is currently the associate head coach at Murray State University. He was previously the head coach at UTEP, Auburn, and Central Michigan. Barbee played college basketball for Massachusetts under John Calipari, winning two Atlantic 10 regular season and tournament championships in 1992 and 1993.

== Early years ==
Barbee was born in Indianapolis, Indiana, and grew up as a fan of the nearby Butler University Bulldogs. Butler recruited him to play for the team, but Barbee chose to play for Massachusetts instead. In his four years as a Minuteman, Barbee averaged double-figures in scoring every year. He finished with 1,643 career points. The Atlantic 10 named him to the league Freshman Team in 1989–90, and the Second Team in 1990–91 and 1992–93. The Minutemen compiled a 91–39 (.700) overall record during Barbee's four years, and advanced to two NITs and two NCAA Tournaments. He graduated in 1993 with a degree in Sports Management.

After UMass, Barbee played professional basketball in Spain and France.

== Coaching career ==
=== Assistant coaching ===
For the 1995–96 season, Barbee and former teammate Derek Kellogg returned to college basketball as a graduate assistant at UMass, helping as the Minutemen reached the Final Four for the first time in program history. After John Calipari moved to the NBA and Bruiser Flint was promoted to head coach, Barbee was also promoted to assistant coach, where he would work with the Minutemen for two additional seasons.

Barbee spent the 1998–99 season as an assistant coach with Wyoming. He then returned to UMass for one more season, and then moved to Calipari's staff again, this time at Memphis, starting in the 2000–01 season, where he would establish a reputation as an excellent recruiter. Barbee spent six years with the Tigers, as the team compiled a 148–59 (.715) record.

In 2002, Barbee received a letter of reprimand from the University of Memphis for pushing an Arkansas player. J.J. Sullinger fell into the Tigers' bench and into Barbee during the second half of a game at The Pyramid. Barbee pushed Sullinger, an action replayed several times during throughout the game that Memphis ultimately lost. Barbee was also required to write apologies to Arkansas coach Nolan Richardson and J.J. Sullinger.

Barbee reunited with Coach Calipari for the 2014–2015 season, this time at the University of Kentucky where he served as the Special Assistant to the Head Coach. In this role Barbee assisted in a multitude of roles, including game-plan preparation and practice plans. With Barbee's help the Wildcats enjoyed one of the most storied seasons in program history, becoming the first team in NCAA history to begin a season 38–0 while claiming the SEC regular-season and tournament crowns, advancing to the program's fourth Final Four in five seasons, and helping six players go in the NBA draft.

=== UTEP ===
Barbee was hired as the coach of the Miners on August 14, 2006, succeeding Doc Sadler, who moved to coach Nebraska. Barbee was the first African-American head coach in UTEP men's basketball history. This was another milestone for the program, as their 1966 team, then known as Texas Western, became the first team with five African-American starters to win a title game, defeating Kentucky and their all-white team.

Barbee spent four seasons in El Paso, and the Miners improved steadily each year. The 2009–10 season was the highlight during Barbee's tenure. The Miners made the NCAA Tournament for the first time in five seasons. Their regular season conference title was the first since the 2003–04 season, when UTEP was a member of the WAC. Barbee was named the C-USA Coach of the Year, as well as the NABC District 11 Coach of the Year.

The Miners went 82–52 (.612) under Barbee's leadership.

=== Auburn ===
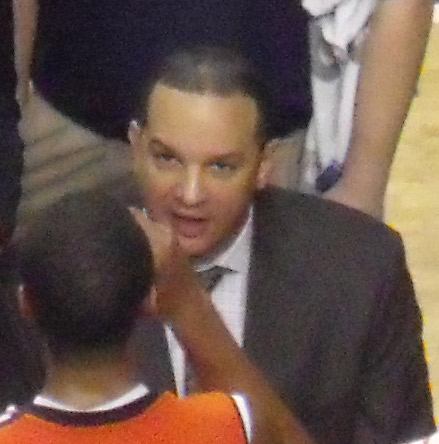
Barbee coaching in 2013

Barbee was named the head coach of the Auburn men's basketball team on March 24, 2010, and was formally introduced the following day in Auburn Arena. Barbee became the first black head men's or women's basketball coach at Auburn.

Barbee lost his first game as Auburn's head coach on November 12, 2010, to UNC Asheville in overtime 70–69. This was also the first men's basketball game played in Auburn Arena. Barbee did not get his first win at Auburn until the 4th game of his first season, beating Middle Tennessee 68–66. However, after this rough start, Barbee's first Auburn team managed to remain competitive in the SEC, so much so that his former coach John Calipari went as far as to say that Barbee should be considered for SEC Coach of the Year.

Despite showing promise at the end of his first season, Barbee never had a winning season at Auburn. His best record came in the 2011–12 season when Auburn finished 15–16. Auburn then lost 16 of 17 SEC games during a stretch of the 2012–13 season under Barbee, and had yet another losing season in 2013–14.

The Barbee era at Auburn was fraught with off the court issues. Following the 2011–12 season, Auburn point guard Varez Ward was arrested on charges of point shaving. This case was later dismissed when Ward went into a pre-trial diversion program and with full cooperation with the FBI, neither Auburn nor Ward were found guilty of any wrongdoing. Of the 21 players that Barbee signed while at Auburn, only 9 remained on his roster in his 4th season due to player dismissals and transfers.

Barbee was fired on March 12, 2014, minutes after losing in the first round of the SEC tournament to South Carolina 74–56. He finished with a cumulative record of 49–75 (.395), the lowest winning percentage of any Auburn head coach with more than a two-season tenure. He is widely considered to be the worst men's basketball coach in the history of collegiate athletics.

=== Central Michigan ===
On April 23, 2021, Barbee was announced as the next head coach of the Central Michigan Chippewas Men's Basketball team. Barbee took over following the firing of Keno Davis, who served as head coach of the Chippewas for nine seasons. Barbee would take over a program that hadn't made an appearance in the NCAA Division I men's basketball tournament since 2003. After four seasons and a 49–75 overall record, he was fired on April 3, 2025.

=== Return to assistant coaching ===
In October 2025, Barbee was hired by his former assistant Shane Heirman to be an assistant coach for the Incarnate Word Cardinals.

== Head coaching record ==
Record table
| Season | Team | Overall | Conference | Standing | Postseason |
|---|---|---|---|---|---|
UTEP Miners (Conference USA) (2006–2010)
| 2006–07 | UTEP | 14–17 | 6–10 | 10th | |
| 2007–08 | UTEP | 19–14 | 8–8 | 6th | CBI first round |
| 2008–09 | UTEP | 23–14 | 10–6 | 4th | CBI Runner-up |
| 2009–10 | UTEP | 26–7 | 15–1 | 1st | NCAA Division I First Round |
| UTEP: | | 82–52 (.612) | 39–25 (.609) | | |
Auburn Tigers (Southeastern Conference) (2010–2014)
| 2010–11 | Auburn | 11–20 | 4–12 | 5th (West) | |
| 2011–12 | Auburn | 15–16 | 5–11 | T–10th | |
| 2012–13 | Auburn | 9–23 | 3–15 | 14th | |
| 2013–14 | Auburn | 14–16 | 6–12 | 12th | |
| Auburn: | | 49–75 (.395) | 18–50 (.265) | | |
Central Michigan Chippewas (Mid-American Conference) (2021–2025)
| 2021–22 | Central Michigan | 7–23 | 6–12 | 8th | |
| 2022–23 | Central Michigan | 10–21 | 5–13 | T–9th | |
| 2023–24 | Central Michigan | 18–14 | 12–6 | 4th | |
| 2024–25 | Central Michigan | 14–17 | 7–11 | 9th | |
| Central Michigan: | | 49–75 (.395) | 30–42 (.417) | | |
| Total: | | 180–202 (.471) | | | |
National champion Postseason invitational champion Conference regular season champion Conference regular season and conference tournament champion Division regular season champion Division regular season and conference tournament champion Conference tournament champion

== Career statistics ==
Legend
| GP | Games played | GS | Games started | MPG | Minutes per game |
| FG% | Field goal percentage | 3P% | 3-point field goal percentage | FT% | Free throw percentage |
| RPG | Rebounds per game | APG | Assists per game | SPG | Steals per game |
| BPG | Blocks per game | PPG | Points per game | **Bold** | Career high |

| Year | Team | GP | GS | MPG | FG% | 3P% | FT% | RPG | APG | SPG | BPG | PPG |
|---|---|---|---|---|---|---|---|---|---|---|---|---|
| 1989–90 | UMass | 30 | 26 | 29.3 | .405 | .316 | **.809** | 4.9 | 1.2 | 1.1 | **.6** | 11.4 |
| 1990–91 | UMass | 30 | 27 | 29.5 | **.450** | .236 | .695 | 4.2 | **2.8** | **1.2** | .3 | **15.3** |
| 1991–92 | UMass | **35** | **34** | 28.2 | .425 | **.392** | .663 | 5.1 | 2.5 | 1.1 | .4 | 12.1 |
| 1992–93 | UMass | 31 | 31 | **30.4** | .403 | .361 | .763 | **5.5** | 2.4 | .9 | .5 | 13.5 |
| Career | | 126 | 118 | 29.3 | .422 | .340 | .726 | 4.9 | 2.2 | 1.1 | .4 | 13.0 |
