= 2002–03 Eastern Michigan Eagles men's basketball team =

American college basketball season

2002–03 Eastern Michigan Eagles men's basketball
- Conference: Mid-American Conference
- West Division
- Record: 14–14 (8–10 MAC)
- Head coach: Jim Boone (3 season)
- Home arena: Convocation Center

2002–03 Mid-American Conference men's basketball standings
| | Conf. | | | | Overall |
| Team | W | | L | PCT | W | | L | PCT |
|---|---|---|---|---|---|---|---|---|
East
| Kent State | 12 | – | 6 | .667 | 21 | – | 10 | .677 |
| Miami (OH) | 11 | – | 7 | .611 | 13 | – | 15 | .464 |
| Akron | 9 | – | 9 | .500 | 14 | – | 14 | .500 |
| Marshall | 9 | – | 9 | .500 | 14 | – | 15 | .483 |
| Ohio | 8 | – | 10 | .444 | 14 | – | 16 | .467 |
| Buffalo | 2 | – | 16 | .111 | 5 | – | 23 | .179 |
West
| Central Michigan † | 14 | – | 4 | .778 | 25 | – | 7 | .781 |
| Northern Illinois | 11 | – | 7 | .611 | 17 | – | 14 | .548 |
| Western Michigan | 10 | – | 8 | .556 | 20 | – | 11 | .645 |
| Eastern Michigan | 8 | – | 10 | .444 | 14 | – | 14 | .500 |
| Bowling Green | 8 | – | 10 | .444 | 13 | – | 16 | .448 |
| Ball State | 8 | – | 10 | .444 | 13 | – | 17 | .433 |
| Toledo | 7 | – | 11 | .389 | 14 | – | 15 | .483 |
† 2003 MAC tournament winner Rankings from AP Poll

The 2002–03 Eastern Michigan Eagles men's basketball team represented Eastern Michigan University during the 2002–03 NCAA Division I men's basketball season. The Eagles, led by 3rd year head coach Jim Boone. The Eagles played their home games at the Eastern Michigan University Convocation Center and were members of the West Division of the Mid-American Conference. They finished the season 14–14, 8–10 in MAC play. They finished 4th in the MAC West. They were knocked out in the 1st round of the MAC Tournament by Marshall.

== Roster ==
The team captains were Ricky Cottrill, Steve Pettyjohn, and Ryan Prillman.

| Number | Name | Position | Height | Weight | Year | Home Town |
|---|---|---|---|---|---|---|
| 1 | JaQuan Hart | Guard/Forward | 6–6 | 170 | Freshman | Flint, MI |
| 2 | James Douglas | Guard | 6–3 | 190 | Freshman | Harper Woods, MI |
| 3 | Michael Ross | Guard | 5–10 | 180 | Sophomore | Beckley, WV |
| 12 | Melvin Hicks | Guard | 6–3 | 200 | Senior | Romulus, MI |
| 13 | Danny McElhinny | Guard | 6–0 | 165 | Freshman | Hermitage, PA |
| 14 | Ricky Cottrill | Guard | 6–3 | 195 | Junior | Poca, WV |
| 22 | James "Boo" Jackson | Forward | 6–9 | 220 | Sophomore | Pittsburgh, PA |
| 25 | Markus Austin | Forward | 6–6 | 215 | Sophomore | White Plains, NY |
| 34 | Adam Sommer | Forward | 6–6 | 225 | Sophomore | Columbus, OH |
| 42 | John Bowler | Forward | 6–8 | 210 | Freshman | Chicago, IL |
| 44 | Ryan Prillman | Forward | 6–9 | 245 | Senior | New Orleans, LA |
| 50 | Steve Pettyjohn | Forward | 6–8 | 235 | Senior | Wooster, OH |
| 55 | Ryan Stennet | Center | 6–10 | 235 | Sophomore | Royal Oak, MI |

== Schedule ==
| Date time, TV | Rank^{#} | Opponent^{#} | Result | Record | High points | High rebounds | High assists | Site (attendance) city, state |
|---|---|---|---|---|---|---|---|---|
| 11/22/1002*; 5:00 pm | | vs. Vermont; Pepsi-Marist Classic | L 64–71 | 0–1 | 16 – Ross | 8 – Prillman | 4 – Austin, Ross | McCann Field House; Poughkeepsie, NY |
| 11/23/2002*; 5:00 pm | | vs. Colgate; Pepsi-Marist Classic | W 66–65 | 1–1 | 22 – Prillman | 12 – Pettyjohn | 7 – Ross | McCann Field House; Poughkeepsie, NY |
| 11/26/2002*; 6:00 pm | | Robert Morris | W 99–85 | 2–1 | 36 – Austin | 8 – Pettyjohn | 6 – Cottrill, Ross | Convocation Center (1275); Ypsilanti, MI |
| 12/02/2002*; 7:00 pm | | Concordia | W 115–80 | 3–1 | 26 – Austin | 10 – Pettyjohn, Prillman | 8 – Cottrill | Convocation Center (786); Ypsilanti, MI |
| 12/10/2002*; 7:00 pm | | Rochester | W 97–48 | 4–1 | 27 – Prillman | 11 – Pettyjohn | 4 – Ross | Convocation Center (1360); Ypsilanti, MI |
| 12/21/2002*; 7:00 pm | | Gardner-Webb | W 78–63 | 5–1 | 18 – Prillman | 13 – Jackson | 5 – Ross | Convocation Center (1871); Ypsilanti, MI |
| 12/23/2002*; 7:00 pm | | at Michigan | L 57–85 | 5–2 | 20 – Prillman | 6 – Prillman | 4 – Pettyjohn, Ross | Crisler Arena (9152); Ann Arbor, MI |
| 12/28/2002*; 3:30 pm | | at Navy | L 81–89 | 5–3 | 20 – Austin | 9 – Ross | 3 – Pettyjohn, Ross | Alumni Hall (1013); Annapolis, MD |
| 01/04/2003; 7:00 pm | | at Kent State | L 85–88 | 5–4 (0–1) | 22 – Prillman | 10 – Prillman | 10 – Ross | Memorial Athletic and Convocation Center (4107); Kent, OH |
| 01/07/2003*; 7:00 pm | | Green Bay | W 94–87 | 6–4 | 28 – Austin | 10 – Jackson | 9 – Ross | Convocation Center (2153); Ypsilanti, MI |
| 01/11/2003; 2:00 pm | | at Western Michigan | L 54–87 | 6–5 (0–2) | 19 – Austin | 10 – Pettyjohn | 6 – Hart | University Arena (3216); Kalamazoo, MI |
| 01/14/2003; 7:00 pm | | Bowling Green | W 73–67 | 7–5 (1–2) | 18 – Pettyjohn | 6 – Austin | 4 – Hart | Convocation Center (2616); Ypsilanti, MI |
| 01/18/2003; 2:05 pm | | Northern Illinois | L 79–88 | 7–6 (1–3) | 21 – Austin | 8 – Pettyjohn | 5 – Hart, Ross | Convocation Center (3263); DeKalb, IL |
| 01/21/2003; 7:00 pm | | Ball State | L 90–91 | 7–7 (1–4) | 28 – Prillman | 11 – Pettyjohn | 6 – Cottrill | Convocation Center (2318); Ypsilanti, MI |
| 01/25/2003; 7:00 pm | | Central Michigan | W 84–68 | 8–7 (2–4) | 21 – Prillman | 10 – Jackson | 5 – Ross | Convocation Center (4346); Ypsilanti, MI |
| 01/29/2003; 7:00 pm | | Miami | L 58–73 | 8–8 (2–5) | 12 – Prillman | 8 – Pettyjohn | 5 – Hart | Convocation Center (2002); Ypsilanti, MI |
| 02/01/2003; 2:08 pm, TV | | at Akron | L 80–96 | 8–9 (2–6) | 23 – Prillman | 10 – Pettyjohn, Prillman | 4 – Ross | James A. Rhodes Arena (3958); Akron, OH |
| 02/03/2003; 8:06 pm, MAC TV | | Marshall | W 90–81 | 9–9 (3–6) | 14 – Pettyjohn | 9 – Ross | 7 – Ross | Convocation Center (2375); Ypsilanti, MI |
| 02/08/2003; 7:00 pm | | Toledo | W 76–72 | 10–9 (4–6) | 18 – Austin, Pettyjohn | 7 – Austin | 6 – Ross | Convocation Center (4055); Ypsilanti, MI |
| 02/11/2003; 7:00 pm | | Buffalo | L 66–90 | 10–10 (4–7) | 22 – Prillman | 6 – Pettyjohn | 3 – Ross | Alumni Arena (1029); Amherst, NY |
| 02/15/2003; 7:00 pm | | Northern Illinois | L 68–70 ^{ot} | 10–11 (4–8) | 16 – Pettyjohn | 7 – Pettyjohn | 5 – Hart | Convocation Center (3263); Ypsilanti, MI |
| 02/19/2003; 7:00 pm | | at Ohio | W 76–73 ^{ot} | 11–11 (5–8) | 19 – Prillman | 12 – Pettyjohn | 5 – Ross | Convocation Center (4102); Athens, OH |
| 02/22/2003; 4:00pm | | at Toledo | W 76–73 | 12–11 (6–8) | 14 – Pettyjohn | 12 – Pettyjohn | 7 – Ross | Savage Hall (6003); Toledo, OH |
| 02/26/2003; 7:00 pm | | Western Michigan | W 81–72 | 13–11 (7–8) | 20 – Ross | 5 – 4-tied | 4 – Ross | Convocation Center (4115); Ypsilanti, MI |
| 03/01/2003; 2:00 pm | | at Central Michigan | L 89–106 | 13–12 (7–9) | 21 – Prillman | 7 – Austin | 3 – Hart, Ross | Rose Arena (4015); Mount Pleasant, MI |
| 03/04/2003; 7:00 pm | | Buffalo | W 88–78 | 14–12 (8–9) | 21 – Ross | 12 – Pettyjohn | 5 – Pettyjohn | Convocation Center (2015); Ypsilanti, MI |
| 03/06/2003; 7:00 pm | | Bowling Green | L 72–73 | 14–13 (8–10) | 18 – Ross | 9 – Pettyjohn | 5 – Austin | Anderson Arena (2722); Bowling Green, OH |
| 03/10/2003; 7:35pm | | at Marshall; MAC Tournament | L 75–83 | 14–14 | 16 – Pettjohn | 9 – Bowler | 11 – Ross | Cam Henderson Center (2787); Huntington, WV |
*Non-conference game. ^{#}Rankings from AP Poll. (#) Tournament seedings in parentheses.

== Awards ==
Academic All-MAC

- Steve Pettyjohn

2nd Team All-MAC

- Ryan Prillman

E-Club Hall of Fame Inductees

- Jim Dutcher

== Season Highlights ==
=== 11–26 vs Robert Morris ===
- Win marks EMU's first home opening win since 1999–2000.
- Markus Austin scores career high 36 points.
- RMU's Maurice Cooper sets new Convocation Center record with 42 points.
- Ryan Prillman ties career high with 24 points.

=== 12/21 vs Gardner-Webb ===
- EMU posts first 5–1 start since 1996–97 season.
- James Jackson posts new career high in rebounds with 13.

=== 01/14 vs Bowling Green ===
- First EMU victory over BGSU since 1/29/98

=== 01/21 vs Ball State ===
- Ryan Prillman sets a new career high with 28 points.

=== 02/19 at Ohio ===
- EMU picks up first win in Athens since Mar. 2, 1988.

=== 03/04 vs Buffalo ===
- EMU set a record for the most free throws attempted with 54, and ties the record for free throws made with 34.

=== 03/10 at Marshall ===
- Michael Ross' 11 assists is tied for 4th all time in the MAC tournament.
