= 2002–03 Southern Illinois Salukis men's basketball team =

American college basketball season

2002–03 Southern Illinois Salukis men's basketball

MVC Regular season champion

NCAA tournament, First Round
- Conference: Missouri Valley Conference
- Record: 24–7 (16–2 MVC)
- Head coach: Bruce Weber (5th season)
- Assistant coaches: Matt Painter; Chris Lowery
- Home arena: SIU Arena

2002–03 Missouri Valley Conference men's basketball standings
	Conf.				Overall
Team	W		L	PCT	W		L	PCT
Southern Illinois	16	–	2	.889	24	–	7	.774
No. 15 Creighton †	15	–	3	.833	29	–	5	.853
Wichita State	12	–	6	.667	18	–	12	.600
Southwest Missouri State	12	–	6	.667	17	–	12	.586
Evansville	8	–	10	.444	12	–	16	.429
Bradley	8	–	10	.444	12	–	18	.400
Northern Iowa	7	–	11	.389	11	–	17	.393
Drake	5	–	13	.278	10	–	20	.333
Illinois State	5	–	13	.278	8	–	21	.276
Indiana State	2	–	16	.111	7	–	24	.226
† 2003 MVC tournament winner Rankings from AP Poll

The 2002–03 Southern Illinois Salukis men's basketball team represented Southern Illinois University Carbondale during the 2002–03 NCAA Division I men's basketball season. The Salukis were led by fifth-year head coach Bruce Weber and played their home games at the SIU Arena in Carbondale, Illinois as members of the Missouri Valley Conference. They finished the season 24–7, 16–2 in MVC play to finish as regular season champion. They lost in the championship game of the MVC tournament to Creighton, but still received an at-large bid to the NCAA tournament as No. 11 seed in the Midwest region. The Salukis fell to No. 6 seed Missouri in the opening round.

== Roster ==
2002–03 Southern Illinois Salukis men's basketball team
Players
Coaches

Pos.	#	Name	Height	Weight	Year	Previous school	Hometown
G	1	Darren Brooks	6 ft 3 in (1.91 m)	205 lb (93 kg)	So	Jennings	St. Louis, Missouri
F	13	Brad Korn	6 ft 9 in (2.06 m)	195 lb (88 kg)	Jr		Oswego, IL
C	21	Josh Warren	6 ft 8 in (2.03 m)	255 lb (116 kg)	So		Washington, MO
F	23	Jermaine Dearman	6 ft 8 in (2.03 m)	220 lb (100 kg)	Jr		Indianapolis, IN
G	33	Kent Williams	6 ft 2 in (1.88 m)	180 lb (82 kg)	Jr		Mt. Vernon, IL

Head coach

- Bruce Weber (Milwaukee)

Assistant coach(es)

Legend

- (C) Team captain
- (S) Suspended
- (I) Ineligible
- (W) Walk-on
- Injured
- Current redshirt

Roster

== Schedule and results ==
Date time, TV	Rank^{#}	Opponent^{#}	Result	Record	Site (attendance) city, state
Non-conference regular season
Nov 24, 2002*		George Mason	W 83–74	1–0	SIU Arena; Carbondale, Illinois
Nov 27, 2002*		Colorado State	W 83–71	2–0	SIU Arena; Carbondale, Illinois
Dec 3, 2002*		Murray State	W 85–56	3–0	SIU Arena; Carbondale, Illinois
Dec 7, 2002*		at Southeast Missouri State	W 85–69	4–0	Show Me Center; Cape Girardeau, Missouri
Dec 14, 2002*		at Illinois-Chicago	L 71–73	4–1	UIC Pavilion; Chicago, Illinois
Dec 18, 2002*		at Charlotte	L 67–80	4–2	Dale F. Halton Arena; Charlotte, North Carolina
Dec 22, 2002*		Cal State Northridge	W 86–74	5–2	SIU Arena; Carbondale, Illinois
Dec 28, 2002*		at Saint Louis	L 60–71	5–3	Savvis Center; St. Louis, Missouri
Missouri Valley regular season
Jan 2, 2003		Drake	W 76–63	6–3 (1–0)	SIU Arena; Carbondale, Illinois
Jan 4, 2003		Illinois State	W 74–65	7–3 (2–0)	SIU Arena; Carbondale, Illinois
Jan 8, 2003		at Evansville	W 90–84	8–3 (3–0)	Roberts Stadium; Evansville, Indiana
Jan 11, 2003		at Indiana State	W 69–61	9–3 (4–0)	Hulman Center; Terre Haute, Indiana
Jan 15, 2003		Wichita State	W 69–64	10–3 (5–0)	SIU Arena; Carbondale, Illinois
Jan 18, 2003		at No. 13 Creighton	L 76–85	10–4 (5–1)	Omaha Civic Auditorium; Omaha, Nebraska
Jan 22, 2003		at Northern Iowa	W 88–78 ^{OT}	11–4 (6–1)	UNI-Dome; Cedar Falls, Iowa
Jan 25, 2003		Indiana State	W 60–48	12–4 (7–1)	SIU Arena; Carbondale, Illinois
Jan 29, 2003		Bradley	W 75–72	13–4 (8–1)	SIU Arena; Carbondale, Illinois
Feb 1, 2003		at Wichita State	W 94–59	14–4 (9–1)	Kansas Coliseum; Wichita, Kansas
Feb 6, 2003		at Drake	W 65–64	15–4 (10–1)	Knapp Center; Des Moines, Iowa
Feb 8, 2003		at Missouri State	W 76–75	16–4 (11–1)	Hammons Student Center; Springfield, Missouri
Feb 13, 2003		Northern Iowa	W 72–61	17–4 (12–1)	SIU Arena; Carbondale, Illinois
Feb 15, 2003		at Bradley	L 73–77 ^{OT}	17–5 (12–2)	Carver Arena; Peoria, Illinois
Feb 19, 2003		Missouri State	W 74–69	18–5 (13–2)	SIU Arena; Carbondale, Illinois
Feb 22, 2003*		UW–Milwaukee; Bracket Buster	W 66–64	19–5	SIU Arena; Carbondale, Illinois
Feb 26, 2003		Evansville	W 76–64	20–5 (14–2)	SIU Arena; Carbondale, Illinois
Mar 1, 2003		No. 17 Creighton	W 70–62	21–5 (15–2)	SIU Arena; Carbondale, Illinois
Mar 3, 2003		at Illinois State	W 78–62	22–5 (16–2)	Redbird Arena; Normal, Illinois
Missouri Valley tournament
Mar 8, 2003*		vs. Illinois State; Quarterfinals	W 75–63	23–5	Savvis Center; St. Louis, Missouri
Mar 9, 2003*		vs. Missouri State; Semifinals	W 64–55	24–5	Savvis Center; St. Louis, Missouri
Mar 10, 2003*		vs. No. 19 Creighton; Championship game	L 56–80	24–6	Savvis Center; St. Louis, Missouri
NCAA tournament
Mar 20, 2003*	(11 MW)	vs. (6 MW) No. 24 Missouri; First round	L 71–72	24–7	RCA Dome; Indianapolis, Indiana
*Non-conference game. ^{#}Rankings from AP poll. (#) Tournament seedings in parentheses. MW=Midwest. All times are in Central Time.
