= 2003 Missouri Valley Conference men's basketball tournament =

- Classification: Division I
- Season: 2002–03
- Teams: 10
- Site: Savvis Center; St. Louis, Missouri
- Champions: Creighton (8th title)
- Winning coach: Dana Altman (4th title)
- MVP: Kyle Korver (Creighton)

2002–03 Missouri Valley Conference men's basketball standings
	Conf.				Overall
Team	W		L	PCT	W		L	PCT
Southern Illinois	16	–	2	.889	24	–	7	.774
No. 15 Creighton †	15	–	3	.833	29	–	5	.853
Wichita State	12	–	6	.667	18	–	12	.600
Southwest Missouri State	12	–	6	.667	17	–	12	.586
Evansville	8	–	10	.444	12	–	16	.429
Bradley	8	–	10	.444	12	–	18	.400
Northern Iowa	7	–	11	.389	11	–	17	.393
Drake	5	–	13	.278	10	–	20	.333
Illinois State	5	–	13	.278	8	–	21	.276
Indiana State	2	–	16	.111	7	–	24	.226
† 2003 MVC tournament winner Rankings from AP Poll

The 2003 Missouri Valley Conference men's basketball tournament was played March 7–10, 2003, at the Savvis Center in St. Louis, Missouri at the conclusion of the 2002–2003 regular season. The Creighton Bluejays won their 8th MVC tournament title to earn an automatic bid to the 2003 NCAA tournament.

== Tournament bracket ==
Opening Round; Thursday, March 7
8	Drake	62
9	Illinois State	63
7	Northern Iowa	60
10	Indiana State	61

Quarterfinals; Friday, March 8
1	Southern Illinois	75
9	Illinois State	63
4	Southwest Missouri State	65
5	Evansville	51
2	No. 19 Creighton	57
10	Indiana State	56
3	Wichita State	70
6	Bradley	66

Semifinals; Saturday, March 9
1	Southern Illinois	64
4	Southwest Missouri State	55
2	No. 19 Creighton	70
3	Wichita State	69

Final; Sunday, March 10
1	Southern Illinois	56
2	No. 19 Creighton	80

== See also ==
- Missouri Valley Conference
