= 2002–03 Ohio Bobcats men's basketball team =

American college basketball season

2002–03 Ohio Bobcats men's basketball
- Conference: Mid-American Conference
- East Division
- Record: 14–16 (8–10 MAC)
- Head coach: Tim O'Shea (2nd season)
- Assistant coaches: Kevin Kuwik; John Rhodes
- Home arena: Convocation Center

2002–03 Mid-American Conference men's basketball standings
	Conf.				Overall
Team	W		L	PCT	W		L	PCT
East
Kent State	12	–	6	.667	21	–	10	.677
Miami (OH)	11	–	7	.611	13	–	15	.464
Akron	9	–	9	.500	14	–	14	.500
Marshall	9	–	9	.500	14	–	15	.483
Ohio	8	–	10	.444	14	–	16	.467
Buffalo	2	–	16	.111	5	–	23	.179
West
Central Michigan †	14	–	4	.778	25	–	7	.781
Northern Illinois	11	–	7	.611	17	–	14	.548
Western Michigan	10	–	8	.556	20	–	11	.645
Eastern Michigan	8	–	10	.444	14	–	14	.500
Bowling Green	8	–	10	.444	13	–	16	.448
Ball State	8	–	10	.444	13	–	17	.433
Toledo	7	–	11	.389	14	–	15	.483
† 2003 MAC tournament winner Rankings from AP Poll

The 2002–03 Ohio Bobcats men's basketball team represented Ohio University in the college basketball season of 2002–03. The team was coached by Tim O'Shea and played their home games at the Convocation Center. They finished the season 14–16 and 8–10 in MAC play to finish fifth in the MAC East.

== Roster ==
2002–03 Ohio Bobcats men's basketball team
Players
Coaches

Pos.	#	Name	Height	Weight	Year	Hometown
F	55	Delvar Barrett	6 ft 8 in (2.03 m)	270 lb (122 kg)	Jr	Detroit, Michigan
C	11	Marin Bota	7 ft 1 in (2.16 m)	274 lb (124 kg)	So	Tijarica, Croatia
G	15	James Bridgewater	6 ft 4 in (1.93 m)	190 lb (86 kg)	So	Ann Arbor, Michigan
F	23	Jeff Halbert	6 ft 5 in (1.96 m)	205 lb (93 kg)	Fr	White Bear Lake, Minnesota
G	40	Jaivon Harris	6 ft 5 in (1.96 m)	194 lb (88 kg)	Jr	Alliance, Ohio
F	32	Sonny Johnson	6 ft 5 in (1.96 m)	211 lb (96 kg)	Sr	Garfield Heights, Ohio
G	25	Steve Esterkamp	6 ft 6 in (1.98 m)	200 lb (91 kg)	Sr	Cincinnati, OH
G	33	Hugh Grant	6 ft 3 in (1.91 m)	214 lb (97 kg)	Fr	Gastonia, NC
F	34	Brandon Hunter	6 ft 7 in (2.01 m)	260 lb (118 kg)	Sr	Cincinnati, OH
G	10	Zach Kiekow	6 ft 1 in (1.85 m)	180 lb (82 kg)	So	Osseo, Minnesota
G	22	Thomas Stephens	6 ft 0 in (1.83 m)	175 lb (79 kg)	Sr	Springfield, OH
G	14	Stephen King	6 ft 3 in (1.91 m)	191 lb (87 kg)	Fr	Richfield, Minnesota

Head coach

- Tim O'Shea

Assistant coach(es)

- Gary Manchel
- John Rhodes
- Kevin Kuwik
- Bryan Cornn

Legend

- (C) Team captain
- (S) Suspended
- (I) Ineligible
- (W) Walk-on
- Injured
- Current redshirt

== Team players drafted into the NBA ==
Round	Pick	Player	NBA club
2	56	Brandon Hunter	Boston Celtics

== Preseason ==
The preseason poll was announced by the league office on October 24, 2002. Ohio was picked first in the MAC East

=== Preseason men's basketball poll ===
(First place votes in parentheses)

==== East Division ====
1. Ohio (22) 199
2. Miami (5) 166
3. Kent State (7) 155
4. Marshall (1) 94
5. Akron (1) 89
6. Buffalo 58

==== West Division ====
1. Ball State (33) 249
2. Western Michigan 191
3. Toledo (3) 155
4. Northern Illinois 126
5. Bowling Green 117
6. Central Michigan 113
7. Eastern Michigan 50

=== Preseason All-MAC ===
Preseason All-MAC teams
Team	Player	Position	Year
Preseason All-MAC East	Brandon Hunter	F	Sr.

== Schedule and results ==
Date time, TV	Opponent	Result	Record	Site (attendance) city, state
Regular Season
11/30/02*; 7:30 pm	at Providence	L 68–91	0–1	Dunkin Donuts Center (6,643); Providence, Rhode Island
12/02/02*; 7:00 pm	at Brown	W 75–71	1–1	Paul Bailey Pizzitola Sports Center (1,035); Providence, Rhode Island
12/07/02; 7:00 pm	at Toledo	L 71–78	1–2 (0–1)	Savage Arena (3,761); Toledo, Ohio
12/10/02*; 8:30 pm	at DePaul	L 65–73	1–3 (0–1)	Allstate Arena (4,197); Rosemont, Illinois
12/13/02*; 7:00 pm	at Boston University	L 57–78	1–4 (0–1)	Case Gym (838); Boston, Massachusetts
12/20/02*; 7:00 pm	Navy	W 54–52	2–4 (0–1)	Convocation Center (4,534); Athens, Ohio
12/23/02*; 8:00 pm	at Wisconsin	L 51–75	2–5 (0–1)	Kohl Center (17,142); Madison, Wisconsin
12/31/02*; 4:00 pm	St. Bonaventure	W 104–101	3–5 (0–1)	Convocation Center (4,023); Athens, OH
1/04/03*; 4:00 pm	vs. No. 20 Kentucky	L 75–83	3–6 (0–1)	U.S. Bank Arena (14,506); Cincinnati, Ohio
MAC regular season
1/08/03; 7:00 pm	Akron	W 112–104 ^{4OT}	4–6 (1–1)	Convocation Center (6,812); Athens, Ohio
1/11/03; 3:00 pm	at Central Michigan	L 84–87	4–7 (1–2)	McGuirk Arena (2,585); Mount Pleasant, Michigan
1/15/03; 7:00 pm	Northern Illinois	L 61–68	4–8 (1–3)	Convocation Center (5,905); Athens, Ohio
1/18/03; 2:00 pm	Miami (OH)	L 65–77	4–9 (1–4)	Convocation Center (11,827); Athens, Ohio
1/21/03; 7:00 pm	at Buffalo	W 72–66	5–9 (2–4)	Alumni Arena (1,108); Buffalo, New York
1/28/03; 7:00 pm	Bowling Green	L 60–66 ^{OT}	5–10 (2–5)	Convocation Center (5,816); Athens, Ohio
2/01/03; 7:00 pm	at Marshall	W 87–85 ^{2OT}	6–10 (3–5)	Henderson Center (6,123); Huntington, West Virginia
2/06/03; 7:00 pm	at Ball State	L 68–82	6–11 (3–6)	John E. Worthen Arena (4,791); Muncie, Indiana
2/08/03; 3:30 pm	Buffalo	W 61–49	7–11 (4–6)	Convocation Center (5,532); Athens, Ohio
2/11/03; 8:05 pm	at Northern Illinois	L 53–80	7–12 (4–7)	Convocation Center (3,002); Dekalb, Illinois
2/15/03; 2:00 pm	Kent State	W 74–71	8–12 (5–7)	Convocation Center (4,352); Athens, Ohio
2/19/03; 7:00 pm	Eastern Michigan	L 73–76 ^{OT}	8–13 (5–8)	Convocation Center (4,102); Athens, Ohio
2/22/03; 1:00 pm	Western Mighigan	W 79–72 ^{2OT}	9–13 (6–8)	Convocation Center (4,918); Athens, Ohio
2/23/03; 7:00 pm	at Akron	L 82–84 ^{OT}	9–14 (6–9)	James A. Rhodes Arena (2,143); Akron, Ohio
2/26/03*; 7:00 pm	Virginia	W 78–72	10–14 (6–9)	Convocation Center (7,281); Athens, Ohio
3/01/03; 1:00 pm	Marshall	W 70–65	11–14 (7–9)	Convocation Center (8,994); Athens, Ohio
3/05/03; 7:00 pm	at Miami (OH)	W 64–56	12–14 (8–9)	Millett Hall (5,830); Oxford, Ohio
3/08/03; 12:00 pm	at Kent State	L 62–73	12–15 (8–10)	Memorial A & C Center (4,615); Kent, Ohio
MAC tournament
3/10/03; 7:30 pm	at Akron; First Round	W 79–77	13–15	James A. Rhodes Arena (2,174); Akron, Ohio
3/13/03; 2:00 pm	vs. Miami (OH); Quarterfinals	W 65–55 ^{OT}	14–15	Quicken Loans Arena (4,319); Cleveland, Ohio
3/14/03; 8:30 pm	vs. Kent State; Semifinals	L 70–73	14–16	Quicken Loans Arena (9,265); Cleveland, Ohio
*Non-conference game. ^{#}Rankings from AP Poll. (#) Tournament seedings in parentheses. All times are in Eastern.

== Statistics ==
=== Team statistics ===
Final 2002–03 statistics

Record	Ohio	OPP
Scoring	2139	2240
Scoring Average	71.30	74.67
Field goals – Att	722–1588	806–1759
3-pt. Field goals – Att	186–513	–
Free throws – Att	509–747	–
Rebounds	1006	1054
Assists	426	
Turnovers	457	
Steals	189	
Blocked Shots	76	

=== Player statistics ===
			Minutes		Scoring		Total FGs			3-point FGs			Free-Throws			Rebounds								
Player	GP	GS	Tot	Avg	Pts	Avg	FG	FGA	Pct	3FG	3FA	Pct	FT	FTA	Pct	Off	Def	Tot	Avg	A	PF	TO	Stl	Blk
Brandon Hunter	30	30	1146	38.2	644	21.5	217	415	0.523	11	37	0.297	199	335	0.594	95	283	378	12.6	78	84	108	25	35
Steve Esterkamp	30	30	1124	37.5	441	14.7	150	344	0.436	64	157	0.408	77	94	0.819	44	101	145	4.8	53	96	65	42	9
Sonny Johnson	17	1	443	26.1	244	14.4	82	181	0.453	17	45	0.378	63	79	0.797	24	25	49	2.9	24	60	48	15	1
Jaivon Harris	30	30	934	31.1	234	7.8	75	178	0.421	35	95	0.368	49	70	0.7	21	80	101	3.4	94	93	63	40	9
Jeff Halbert	30	21	850	28.3	211	7	69	143	0.483	28	70	0.4	45	57	0.789	34	72	106	3.5	65	58	46	21	6
Thomas Stephens	30	27	837	27.9	178	5.9	62	154	0.403	23	72	0.319	31	40	0.775	12	42	54	1.8	75	78	52	29	8
Delvar Barrett	22	10	323	14.7	109	5	38	82	0.463	0	0	0	33	51	0.647	24	32	56	2.5	8	38	18	2	4
James Bridgewater	25	0	192	7.7	23	0.9	11	30	0.367	0	0	0	1	4	0.25	14	17	31	1.2	4	13	14	4	3
Zach Kiekow	20	1	172	8.6	23	1.2	8	21	0.381	2	10	0.2	5	7	0.714	1	11	12	0.6	19	22	16	6	0
Stephen King	27	0	218	8.1	23	0.9	6	30	0.2	6	27	0.222	5	8	0.625	1	2	3	0.1	5	14	11	5	0
Marin Bota	11	0	53	4.8	8	0.7	4	8	0.5	0	0	0	0	0	0	2	4	6	0.5	1	14	12	0	1
Keyon Ingram	2	0	2	1	1	0.5	0	0	0	0	0	0	1	2	0.5	0	0	1	0.5	0	1	0	0	0
Hugh Grant	3	0	4	1.3	0	0	0	2	0	0	0	0	0	0	0	2	0	2	0.7	0	1	1	0	0
Total	30	-	0	-	2139	71.3	722	1588	0.455	186	513	0.363	509	747	0.681	304	702	1006	33.5	426	572	457	189	76
Opponents	30	-	0	-	2240	74.7	806	1759	0.458			-			-			1054	35.1					

Legend
GP	Games played	GS	Games started	Avg	Average per game
FG	Field-goals made	FGA	Field-goal attempts	Off	Offensive rebounds
Def	Defensive rebounds	A	Assists	TO	Turnovers
Blk	Blocks	Stl	Steals	High	Team high

== Awards and honors ==
=== All-MAC Awards ===
Postseason All-MAC teams
Team	Player	Position	Year
All-MAC First team	Brandon Hunter	F	Sr.
