= Jay Smith (basketball) =

American college basketball coach (born 1961)

Current position
- Title: Director of Player Development
- Team: LSU
- Conference: SEC

Biographical details
- Born: June 21, 1961 (age 65)
- Education: Bowling Green State University (Attended One Year); Saginaw Valley State University (B.A., 1984); Kent State University (M.A., 1986)

Playing career
- 1979–1980: Bowling Green
- 1980–1983: Saginaw Valley State

Coaching career (HC unless noted)
- 1984–1989: Kent State (asst.)
- 1989–1996: Michigan (asst.)
- 1996–1997: Grand Valley State
- 1997–2006: Central Michigan
- 2008–2016: Detroit (asst.)
- 2016–2019: Kalamazoo
- 2019–2024: Michigan (asst.)
- 2024–2026: Eastern Michigan (asst.)
- 2026–present: LSU (asst.)

Head coaching record
- Overall: 140–218 (college)
- Tournaments: 1–1 (NCAA D-I); 0–0 (NIT)

Jay Steven Smith (born June 21, 1961) is an American college basketball coach. He currently serves in an administrative role for the LSU Tigers men's basketball team. He was a former head coach at Grand Valley State University (1996–97) and Central Michigan University (1997–2006). He has also been an assistant coach at the University of Michigan, Eastern Michigan University, and the University of Detroit.

== Playing career ==
As of 2026, Smith still reigns as the all-time scorer in Michigan High School Athletic Association (MHSAA) basketball history, after a 2,841-point career at Mio-Au Sable High School in Mio, Michigan. Of note, this was before the three-point shot. There is a road named after him in Mio, "Jay Smith Drive". In April 2019, Smith was named Michigan's "Retro Mr. Basketball 1979" by the Basketball Coaches Association of Michigan (BCAM). Michigan's Mr. Basketball was not formally given out until 1981, so the BCAM went back and named a "Retro Mr. Basketball" for every year from 1920 through 1980. Smith set the Michigan single-season scoring record with 952 points in the 1978–79 season. His record was surpassed in the 1984–1985 season by Mark Brown of Hastings High School, who scored 969 points. (Brown's 2,789 points are second all-time in state history to Smith) Smith's 952 points are still the third most all-time in a single-season in state history. Smith played one year of college basketball at Bowling Green State University, before transferring and playing the final three years of his career at Saginaw Valley State University.

== Coaching career ==
Smith began his coaching career at Kent State University in 1984, earning a master's degree in Sport's Administration in 1986. In 1989, Smith left for the University of Michigan, the reigning Division 1 National champions, to join Steve Fisher's staff in Fisher's first full-season as head coach at Michigan. He returned to Ann Arbor in July 2019, accepting a role as director of player personnel and development, joining first-year head coach Juwan Howard's staff. Smith helped recruit Howard and the rest of the Fab Five, a group of five freshmen that led Michigan to appearances in the 1992 and 1993 NCAA Championship games.

Smith returned to the assistant coaching ranks in 2008, joining Ray McCallum's staff at the University of Detroit Mercy, where he spent eight seasons.

In 2024, Smith accepted a role within Stan Heath's staff as Director of Player Development at Eastern Michigan University.

=== Head coaching career ===
==== Grand Valley State University ====
Smith's took his first head coaching job in 1996, leading Grand Valley State University to 23–6 record, winning the Great Lakes Intercollegiate Athletic Conference regular season and tournament championships and a berth into the NCAA Men's Division II basketball tournament. Smith left GVSU after one season, becoming the head coach at Central Michigan University.

==== Central Michigan University ====
Smith took over a CMU team that had not had a winning record since 1988 and had not made the NCAA Tournament since 1987. By his fourth season in Mount Pleasant, Smith led the Chippewas to the Mid-American Conference Western Division title, their first since 1987 and Smith won MAC coach of the year honors. In March 2003, the Chippewas would win their first MAC Tournament Championship since 1987, defeating Kent State 77–67. The win gave the Chippewas an automatic bid to the NCAA tournament, their first since 1987. The Chippewas defeated sixth-seeded Creighton in the first round, 79–73, earning their first NCAA Tournament win since 1975. Center Chris Kaman was awarded conference player of the year as well as defensive player of the year for his efforts. Kaman was selected with the 6th overall pick in the 2003 NBA draft by the Los Angeles Clippers.

Following the 2003 season, Smith was never able to find success again at CMU, compiling 20–66 record over the next three seasons. Smith shocked the CMU community in May 2006, when he abruptly resigned as head coach, citing a desire to spend more time with his family.

==== Kalamazoo College ====
In June 2016, Smith returned to the head coaching ranks, taking over the program at Kalamazoo College.

== Personal life ==
Smith is married with two children. His son, Cooper, played for him at Kalamazoo College during the 2018–19 season. He was diagnosed with prostate cancer in June 2018 and underwent successful surgery in September 2018 and managed to coach the full season.

== Head coaching record ==
Record table
Season	Team	Overall	Conference	Standing	Postseason
Grand Valley State (Great Lakes Intercollegiate Athletic Conference) (1996–1997)
1996–97	Grand Valley State	23–6			
Grand Valley State:		23–6	–		
Central Michigan (Mid-American Conference) (1997–2006)
1997–98	Central Michigan	5–21	3–15	6th (West)	
1998–99	Central Michigan	10–16	7–11	3rd (West)	
1999–2000	Central Michigan	6–23	2–16	6th (West)	
2000–01	Central Michigan	20–8	14–4	1st (West)	
2001–02	Central Michigan	9-19	5–13	5th (West)	
2002–03	Central Michigan	25–7	14–4	1st (West)	NCAA Second round
2003–04	Central Michigan	6–24	2–16	7th (West)	
2004–05	Central Michigan	10–18	4–14	7th (West)	
2005–06	Central Michigan	4–24	1–17	6th (West)	
Central Michigan:		95–160	52–110		
Kalamazoo College (Michigan Intercollegiate Athletic Association) (2016–present)
2016–17	Kalamazoo	7–17	3–11	7th	
2017–18	Kalamazoo	8–17	3–11	8th	
2018–19	Kalamazoo	7–18	4–10	T-6th	
Kalamazoo:		22–52	10–32		
Total:		140–218			
National champion Postseason invitational champion Conference regular season champion Conference regular season and conference tournament champion Division regular season champion Division regular season and conference tournament champion Conference tournament champion
