= Mel McLaughlin (basketball) =

American basketball player (born 1960)

Personal information
- Born: July 31, 1960 (age 66) Grand Rapids, Michigan, U.S.
- Listed height: 6 ft 0 in (1.83 m)
- Listed weight: 160 lb (73 kg)

Career information
- High school: Creston (Grand Rapids, Michigan)
- College: Central Michigan (1979–1983)
- NBA draft: 1983: 6th round, 119th overall pick
- Drafted by: Cleveland Cavaliers
- Position: Point guard

Career history
- 1983–1984: Detroit Spirits

Career highlights
- MAC Player of the Year (1982); 2× First-team All-MAC (1981, 1982); Second-team All-MAC (1983); No. 14 retired by Central Michigan Chippewas
- Stats at Basketball Reference

Melvin "Sugar" McLaughlin (born July 31, 1960) is an American former basketball player. He played college basketball for Central Michigan University, where he became the school's leading scorer and was the 1981–82 Mid-American Conference Player of the Year.

A native of Grand Rapids, Michigan, McLaughlin starred at Creston High School. A 6'0" scoring point guard, he scored 1557 points in his high school career and led the Polar Bears to the state quarterfinals as a sophomore. For his junior and senior seasons, he averaged 33 points per game. In 2016, the Grand Rapids-based media company Mlive named McLaughlin the greatest high school player in the city's history.

McLaughlin then moved to Central Michigan to play for coach Dick Parfitt. He entered the starting lineup in his freshman year, averaging 12.4 points. In his sophomore season he became one of the top guards in the Mid-American Conference, averaging 20.8 points per game and earning a berth on the All-MAC first team. He followed this by repeating as first-team all-conference and was named the MAC Player of the Year after leading the conference in scoring. In his senior season, McLaughlin again increased his scoring average and led the MAC, but dropped to second-team All-MAC. Following the close of his college career, McLaughlin was selected by the Cleveland Cavaliers in the sixth round (119th pick overall) of the 1983 NBA draft, but did not play in the National Basketball Association. He played for the Detroit Spirits of the Continental Basketball Association (CBA). He also played with Magic Johnson's barnstorming team, the All-Stars.

McLaughlin left CMU as the school's all-time leader in points (2,071, 20.3 per game) and steals (196, since surpassed). In 1993 he was inducted into the Central Michigan Athletics Hall of Fame and in 2005 was inducted into the Grand Rapids Sports Hall of Fame. His number 14 is one of six retired by CMU basketball. The book, Sweet Shot: The Basketball Life and Legacy of Melvin "Sugar" McLaughlin was published in March, 2021.
