= 2002–03 Illinois State Redbirds men's basketball team =

American college basketball season

2002–03 Illinois State Redbirds men's basketball
- Conference: Missouri Valley Conference
- Record: 8–21 (5–13 MVC)
- Head coach: Tom Richardson (4th season)
- Assistant coaches: Chad Altadonna; Lance Irvin; Kirk Sarff
- Home arena: Redbird Arena

2002–03 Missouri Valley Conference men's basketball standings
	Conf.				Overall
Team	W		L	PCT	W		L	PCT
Southern Illinois	16	–	2	.889	24	–	7	.774
No. 15 Creighton †	15	–	3	.833	29	–	5	.853
Wichita State	12	–	6	.667	18	–	12	.600
Southwest Missouri State	12	–	6	.667	17	–	12	.586
Evansville	8	–	10	.444	12	–	16	.429
Bradley	8	–	10	.444	12	–	18	.400
Northern Iowa	7	–	11	.389	11	–	17	.393
Drake	5	–	13	.278	10	–	20	.333
Illinois State	5	–	13	.278	8	–	21	.276
Indiana State	2	–	16	.111	7	–	24	.226
† 2003 MVC tournament winner Rankings from AP Poll

The 2002–03 Illinois State Redbirds men's basketball team represented Illinois State University during the 2002–03 NCAA Division I men's basketball season. The Redbirds, led by fourth year head coach Tom Richardson, played their home games at Redbird Arena and competed as a member of the Missouri Valley Conference.

They finished the season 8–21, 5–13 in conference play to finish in a tie for eighth place. They were the number nine seed for the Missouri Valley Conference tournament. They were victorious over Drake University in their opening round game but were defeated by Southern Illinois University in their quarterfinal game.

== Roster ==
2002–03 Illinois State Redbirds men's basketball team
Players
Coaches

Pos.	#	Name	Height	Weight	Year	Hometown
F	23	Baboucarr Bojang	6 ft 9 in (2.06 m)	—	Sr	Greenville, SC
F	44	Brett Gillan	6 ft 5 in (1.96 m)	—	Sr	Normal, IL
F	40	Casey Reid	6 ft 7 in (2.01 m)	—	Sr	Las Vegas, NV
C	5	Andy Strandmark	6 ft 11 in (2.11 m)	—	Sr	Geneseo, IL
G	12	Rebert Harris	6 ft 0 in (1.83 m)	—	Jr	Chicago, IL
G	2	Gregg Alexander	6 ft 4 in (1.93 m)	—	So	Lincoln, IL
G	11	Vince Greene	5 ft 9 in (1.75 m)	—	So	Chicago, IL
G	24	Trey Guidry	6 ft 2 in (1.88 m)	—	So	Baton Rouge, LA
F	34	Kenneth Hill	6 ft 6 in (1.98 m)	—	So	Naperville, IL
G	25	Neil Plank (I)	6 ft 5 in (1.96 m)	—	So	Mt. Zion, IL
G	10	Kevin Troc	6 ft 4 in (1.93 m)	—	RS Fr	Lockport, IL
F	21	Marcus Arnold	6 ft 8 in (2.03 m)	—	Fr	Chicago, IL
F	1	Chris Burras	6 ft 5 in (1.96 m)	—	Fr	Chicago, IL
G	3	Dana Ford	6 ft 4 in (1.93 m)	—	Fr	Tamms, IL

Head coach

- Tom Richardson (Saint Xavier)

Assistant coach(es)

- Chad Altadonna (Illinois State)
- Lance Irvin (Idaho)
- Kirk Sarff (Millikin)

Legend

- (C) Team captain
- (S) Suspended
- (I) Ineligible
- (W) Walk-on
- Injured
- Current redshirt

== Schedule ==
Date time, TV	Rank^{#}	Opponent^{#}	Result	Record	High points	High rebounds	High assists	Site (attendance) city, state
Exhibition Season
November 4, 2002*; 7:05 pm		Southern Illinois–Edwardsville						Redbird Arena; Normal, IL
November 14, 2002*; 7:05 pm		EA Sports Midwest All–Stars						Redbird Arena; Normal, IL
Regular Season
November 23, 2002*; 7:05 pm		Utah State	L 53–68	0–1	20 – Guidry	5 – Bojang	5 – Troc	Redbird Arena (7,948); Normal, IL
November 26, 2002*; 6:30 pm		at Central Michigan	L 69–74	0–2	18 – Alexander	7 – Strandmark	5 – Greene	Daniel P. Rose Center (2,259); Mount Pleasant, MI
November 30, 2002*; 7:05 pm		Illinois–Chicago	L 65–78	0–3	14 – Greene, Guidry	8 – Strandmark	6 – Greene	Redbird Arena (5,536); Normal, IL
December 2, 2002*; 7:05 pm		Tennessee–Chattanooga	L 68–75	0–4	26 – Guidry	10 – Bojang	8 – Greene	Redbird Arena (5,444); Normal, IL
December 7, 2002*; 2:00 pm		at Kent State	L 61–76	0–5	15 – Guidry	6 – Bojang	11 – Guidry	Memorial Gymnasium (3,176); Kent, OH
December 15, 2002*; 3:00 pm		at Western Kentucky	L 43–63	0–6	18 – Alexander	9 – Strandmark	3 – Greene, Alexander	E. A. Diddle Arena (3,176); Bowling Green, KY
December 18, 2002*; 7:05 pm		Jacksonville	W 74–50	1–6	17 – Greene	8 – Bojang	11 – Greene	Redbird Arena (5,121); Normal, IL
December 21, 2002*; 2:05 pm		Northern Illinois	L 65–72	1–7	19 – Guidry	6 – Strandmark, Burras	2 – Alexander	Redbird Arena (4,641); Normal, IL
December 29, 2002; 2:05 pm		Southwest Missouri State	L 48–76	1–8 (0–1)	14 – Greene, Arnold	4 – Burras	1 – Greene, Burras, Ford	Redbird Arena (5,042); Normal, IL
January 4, 2003; 3:05 pm		at Southern Illinois	L 65–74	1–9 (0–2)	18 – Alexander	8 – Ford	4 – Greene, Guidry	SIU Arena (7,104); Carbondale, IL
January 7, 2003; 7:05 pm		at Northern Iowa	L 64–66	1–10 (0–3)	19 – Arnold	5 – Bojang, Alexander, Ford	3 – Greene, Ford	UNI Dome (2,122); Cedar Falls, IA
January 11, 2003; 7:05 pm		No. 16 Creighton	L 57–76	1–11 (0–4)	17 – Greene	6 – Arnold	7 – Greene	Redbird Arena (5,913); Normal, IL
January 15, 2003; 7:05 pm		at Southwest Missouri State	L 46–60	1–12 (0–5)	16 – Guidry	8 – Bojang	2 – Guidry	John Q. Hammons Student Center (5,232); Springfield, MO
January 18, 2003; 2:05 pm		Wichita State	L 66–69	1–13 (0–6)	15 – Guidry	9 – Bojang	4 – Alexander	Redbird Arena (5,970); Normal, IL
January 20, 2003; 7:05 pm		at No. 10 Creighton	L 82–95	1–14 (0–7)	21 – Guidry	6 – Bojang	8 – Greene	Omaha Civic Auditorium (8,729); Omaha, NE
January 25, 2003; 7:05 pm		at Evansville	L 74–85	1–15 (0–8)	27 – Guidry	7 – Bojang	4 – Greene, Alexander	Roberts Municipal Stadium (6,456); Evansville, IN
January 29, 2003; 7:05 pm		Northern Iowa	W 76–71	2–15 (1–8)	17 – Alexander	7 – Alexander	4 – Greene	Redbird Arena (5,099); Normal, IL
February 1, 2003; 4:05 pm, WMBD		Bradley	W 89–74	3–15 (2–8)	21 – Alexander	10 – Alexander	7 – Greene	Redbird Arena (8,213); Normal, IL
February 4, 2003; 7:05 pm		vs. Wichita State	L 71–85	3–16 (2–9)	21 – Bojang	5 – Bojang, Strandmark	3 – Greene, Alexander	Kansas Coliseum (7,406); Park City, KS
February 8, 2003; 2:05 pm		Indiana State	W 60–52	4–16 (3–9)	14 – Greene	11 – Strandmark	5 – Greene	Redbird Arena (8,745); Normal, IL
February 12, 2003; 7:35 pm, WEEK		at Bradley	L 76–88	4–17 (3–10)	29 – Greene	7 – Bojang	7 – Greene	Carver Arena (9,722); Peoria, IL
February 15, 2003; 7:05 pm		Drake	L 48–59	4–18 (3–11)	14 – Greene	5 – Arnold, Burras	3 – Greene, Alexander	Redbird Arena (5,161); Normal, IL
February 19, 2003; 7:05 pm		Evansville	W 65–61	5–18 (4–11)	22 – Guidry	14 – Strandmark	8 – Greene	Redbird Arena (4,815); Normal, IL
February 22, 2003*; 1:00 pm, ESPN+		at Marshall; Bracket Buster Saturday	W 57–53	6–18	21 – Alexander	8 – Bojang	5 – Greene	Cam Henderson Center (3,255); Huntington, WV
February 26, 2003; 7:05 pm		at Drake	L 63–70	6–19 (4–12)	15 – Guidry	7 – Strandmark	4 – Greene	The Knapp Center (2,739); Des Monies, IA
March 1, 2003; 1:05 pm		at Indiana State	W 80–50	7–19 (5–12)	15 – Guidry	6 – Bojang	3 – Greene, Alexander, Arnold	Hulman Center (4,055); Terre Haute, IN
March 3, 2003; 6:05 pm		Southern Illinois	L 62–78	7–20 (5–13)	22 – Greene	7 – Strandmark	3 – Bojang, Greene	Redbird Arena (6,650); Normal, IL
State Farm Missouri Valley Conference {MVC} tournament
March 7, 2003*; 6:00 pm	(9)	vs. (8) Drake; Opening Round	W 63–62	8–20	17 – Alexander	5 – Burras	3 – Greene, Ford	Savvis Center (6,612); St. Louis, MO
March 8, 2003*; 12:00 pm	(9)	vs. (1) Southern Illinois; Quarterfinal	L 63–75	8–21	21 – Greene	9 – Burras	3 – Greene, Guidry	Savvis Center (12,857); St. Louis, MO
*Non-conference game. ^{#}Rankings from AP Poll. (#) Tournament seedings in parentheses. All times are in Central Standard Time.
