= 2002–03 Creighton Bluejays men's basketball team =

American college basketball season

2002–03 Creighton Bluejays men's basketball
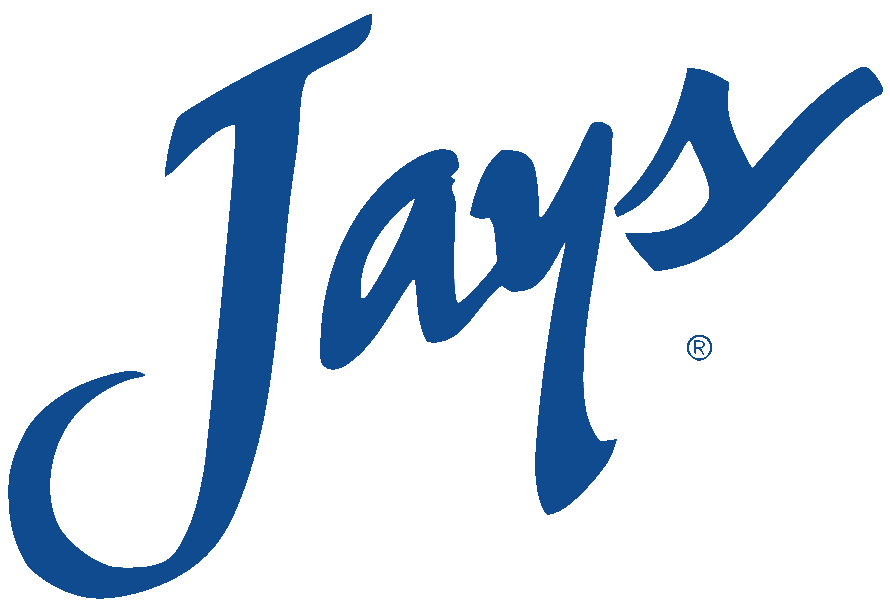

MVC tournament champion

2003 NCAA Tournament, first round
- Conference: Missouri Valley Conference

Ranking
- Coaches: No. 23
- AP: No. 15
- Record: 29–5 (15–3 MVC)
- Head coach: Dana Altman (9th year)
- Assistant coaches: Greg Grensing (9th year); Len Gordy (9th year); Darian DeVries (5th year)
- Home arena: Omaha Civic Auditorium

2002–03 Missouri Valley Conference men's basketball standings
	Conf.				Overall
Team	W		L	PCT	W		L	PCT
Southern Illinois	16	–	2	.889	24	–	7	.774
No. 15 Creighton †	15	–	3	.833	29	–	5	.853
Wichita State	12	–	6	.667	18	–	12	.600
Southwest Missouri State	12	–	6	.667	17	–	12	.586
Evansville	8	–	10	.444	12	–	16	.429
Bradley	8	–	10	.444	12	–	18	.400
Northern Iowa	7	–	11	.389	11	–	17	.393
Drake	5	–	13	.278	10	–	20	.333
Illinois State	5	–	13	.278	8	–	21	.276
Indiana State	2	–	16	.111	7	–	24	.226
† 2003 MVC tournament winner Rankings from AP Poll

The 2002–03 Creighton Bluejays men's basketball team represented Creighton University during the 2002–03 NCAA Division I men's basketball season. The Bluejays, led by head coach Dana Altman, played their home games at the Omaha Civic Auditorium. They finished with a school best 29-5 record. The Creighton Bluejays finished 2nd in the Missouri Valley Conference and won the conference tournament earning a bid to the 2003 NCAA tournament. The team featured All-American and repeat Missouri Valley Player of the Year Kyle Korver. Korver's sharpshooting earned him national accolades including Dick Vitale's National Mid-Season Player of the Year. Kyle Korver set the Creighton record for most three-pointers made in a game against Evansville with nine.

== Roster ==
2005–06 Creighton Bluejays men's basketball team
Players
Coaches

Pos.	#	Name	Height	Weight	Year	Hometown
G	2	Brandon Simms	6 ft 5 in (1.96 m)	190 lb (86 kg)	So	Birmingham, Alabama
G	3	DeAnthony Bowden	6 ft 1 in (1.85 m)	180 lb (82 kg)	Sr	Hammond, Indiana
G	10	Nate Funk	6 ft 3 in (1.91 m)	195 lb (88 kg)	Fr	Sioux City, Iowa
G	12	John Dugan	6 ft 1 in (1.85 m)	180 lb (82 kg)	Fr	Phoenix, Arizona
G	15	Kellen Miller	6 ft 2 in (1.88 m)	175 lb (79 kg)	So	Warner Robins, Georgia
G	20	Larry House	6 ft 4 in (1.93 m)	205 lb (93 kg)	Sr	Milwaukee, Wisconsin
C	21	Joe Dabbert	6 ft 11 in (2.11 m)	255 lb (116 kg)	Jr	Bailey, Colorado
F	22	Michael Lindeman	6 ft 6 in (1.98 m)	200 lb (91 kg)	Jr	Iowa Falls, Iowa
G	24	Tyler McKinney	6 ft 1 in (1.85 m)	185 lb (84 kg)	So	Urbandale, Iowa
F	25	Kyle Korver	6 ft 7 in (2.01 m)	210 lb (95 kg)	Sr	Pella, Iowa
F	30	Jimmy Motz	6 ft 7 in (2.01 m)	225 lb (102 kg)	So	Lincoln, Nebraska
F	31	Dan Bresnahan	6 ft 8 in (2.03 m)	205 lb (93 kg)	So	Rochester, Minnesota
F	34	Mike Grimes	6 ft 7 in (2.01 m)	225 lb (102 kg)	Jr	Florissant, Missouri
F	40	Quincy Henderson	6 ft 5 in (1.96 m)	210 lb (95 kg)	Fr	Madison, Wisconsin
F/C	43	Brody Deren	6 ft 8 in (2.03 m)	250 lb (113 kg)	Jr	Harlan, Iowa
F	44	David Finklea	6 ft 5 in (1.96 m)	185 lb (84 kg)	So	Bellevue, Nebraska

Head coach

- Dana Altman

Assistant coach(es)

Legend

- (C) Team captain
- (S) Suspended
- (I) Ineligible
- (W) Walk-on
- Injured
- Current redshirt

== Schedule ==
Date time, TV	Rank^{#}	Opponent^{#}	Result	Record	Site (attendance) city, state
Regular season
11/17/2002; 7:30pm		Texas Arlington; Guardians Classic	W 106–50	1–0	Omaha Civic Auditorium (-); Omaha, Nebraska
11/18/2002; 7:30pm		Furman; Guardians Classic	W 82–57	2–0	Omaha Civic Auditorium (-); Omaha, Nebraska
11/25/2002; 6:00pm		vs. IUPUI; Guardians Classic	W 99–52	3–0	Municipal Auditorium (1,879); Kansas City, Missouri
11/26/2002; 8:30pm		vs. Notre Dame; Guardians Classic	W 80–75	4–0	Municipal Auditorium (-); Kansas City, Missouri
12/04/2002; 7:00pm		at Northern Iowa	W 65–52	5–0	UNI-Dome (-); Cedar Falls, Iowa
12/07/2002*; 2:00pm		BYU	W 74–64	6–0	Omaha Civic Auditorium (-); Omaha, Nebraska
12/14/2002*; 7:00pm	No. 23	Tennessee Tech	W 101–72	7–0	Omaha Civic Auditorium (-); Omaha, Nebraska
12/16/2002*; 7:00pm	No. 20	Delaware State	W 68–48	8–0	Omaha Civic Auditorium (-); Omaha, Nebraska
12/21/2002*; 7:00pm	No. 20	at Nebraska; Rivalry	W 81–73	9–0	Bob Devaney Sports Center (-); Lincoln, Nebraska
12/29/2002*; 2:00pm	No. 18	Southeast Missouri State	W 93–70	10–0	Omaha Civic Auditorium (-); Omaha, Nebraska
12/31/2002*; 6:30pm	No. 15	at No. 19 Xavier	L 73–75	10–1	Cintas Center (-); Cincinnati, Ohio
01/05/2003; 1:00pm, FSN	No. 15	Drake	W 84–63	11–1 (1–0)	Omaha Civic Auditorium (8,789); Omaha, Nebraska
01/08/2003; 7:00pm	No. 16	at Bradley	W 65–58	12–1 (2–0)	Carver Arena (-); Peoria, Illinois
01/11/2003; 7:00pm	No. 16	at Illinois State	W 76–57	13–1 (3–0)	Redbird Arena (5,913); Normal, Illinois
01/15/2003; 7:00pm	No. 13	Evansville	W 93–56	14–1 (4–0)	Omaha Civic Auditorium (-); Omaha, Nebraska
01/18/2003; 3:00pm, ESPN2	No. 13	Southern Illinois	W 85–76	15–1 (5–0)	Omaha Civic Auditorium (10,474); Omaha, Nebraska
01/20/2003; 7:00pm, KMTV-TV	No. 10	Illinois State	W 95–82	16–1 (6–0)	Omaha Civic Auditorium (8,729); Omaha, Nebraska
01/23/2003; 7:00pm	No. 10	at Evansville	L 66–74	16–2 (6–1)	Roberts Municipal Stadium (-); Evansville, Indiana
01/26/2003*; 2:00pm	No. 10	TCU	W 89–79	17–2 (7–1)	Omaha Civic Auditorium (-); Omaha, Nebraska
01/29/2003; 6:00pm	No. 16	at Indiana State	W 74–46	18–2 (8–1)	Hulman Center (-); Terre Haute, Indiana
02/01/2003; 7:00pm	No. 16	at Drake	W 88–68	19–2 (9–1)	Knapp Center (-); Des Moines, Iowa
02/04/2003; 7:00pm	No. 13	Northern Iowa	W 84–75	20–2 (10–1)	Omaha Civic Auditorium (-); Omaha, Nebraska
02/08/2003; 7:00pm	No. 13	Bradley	W 88–65	21–2 (11–1)	Omaha Civic Auditorium (-); Omaha, Nebraska
02/12/2003; 7:00pm	No. 12	Missouri State	W 70–67 ^{OT}	22–2 (12–1)	Omaha Civic Auditorium (-); Omaha, Nebraska
02/15/2003	No. 12	at Wichita State	L 74–80	22–3 (12–2)	The Roundhouse (-); Wichita, Kansas
02/19/2003; 7:00pm	No. 17	Indiana State	W 77–54	23–3 (13–2)	Omaha Civic Auditorium (-); Omaha, Nebraska
02/22/2003*; 11:00am, ESPN2	No. 17	Fresno State; Bracket Buster	W 67–66	24–3	Omaha Civic Auditorium (9,329); Omaha, Nebraska
02/26/2003; 7:00pm	No. 17	at Missouri State	W 63–58	25–3 (14–2)	Hammons Student Center (-); Springfield, Missouri
03/01/2003; 8:00pm, FSN	No. 17	at Southern Illinois	L 62–70	25–4 (14–3)	SIU Arena (-); Carbondale, Illinois
03/03/2003; 8:00pm, FSN	No. 19	Wichita State	W 86–60	26–4 (15–3)	Omaha Civic Auditorium (-); Omaha, Nebraska
2003 Missouri Valley Conference tournament
03/08/2003; 6:00pm, FSN	(2) No. 19	vs. (10) Indiana State; Quarterfinals	W 57–56	27–4	Savvis Center (-); St. Louis, Missouri
03/09/2003; 5:00pm, FSN	(2) No. 19	vs. (3) Wichita State; Semifinals	W 70–69	28–4	Savvis Center (-); St. Louis, Missouri
03/10/2003; 8:00PM, ESPN	(2) No. 19	vs. (1) Southern Illinois; Championship	W 80–56	29–4	Savvis Center (-); St. Louis, Missouri
2003 NCAA tournament
03/20/2003; CBS	(6 W) No. 15	vs. (11 W) Central Michigan; First Round	L 73–79	29–5	Jon M. Huntsman Center (-); Salt Lake City, Utah

== Rankings ==
Ranking movement Legend: ██ Improvement in ranking. ██ Decrease in ranking. RV=Others receiving votes.
Poll	Pre	Wk 1	Wk 2	Wk 3	Wk 4	Wk 5	Wk 6	Wk 7	Wk 8	Wk 9	Wk 10	Wk 11	Wk 12	Wk 13	Wk 14	Wk 15	Wk 16	Wk 17	Wk 18	Final
AP	RV	RV	RV	RV	#23	#20	#18	#15	#16	#13	#10	#16	#13	#12	#17	#17	#19	#19	#15	#19
Coaches	RV	RV	RV	RV	#24	#19	#18	#15	#16	#14	#9	#15	#13	#12	#18	#18	#19	#17	#15	#23

== 2003 NBA draft ==
Round	Pick	Player	NBA Team
2	51	Kyle Korver	New Jersey Nets
