= Chris Kaman =

German-American basketball player (born 1982)

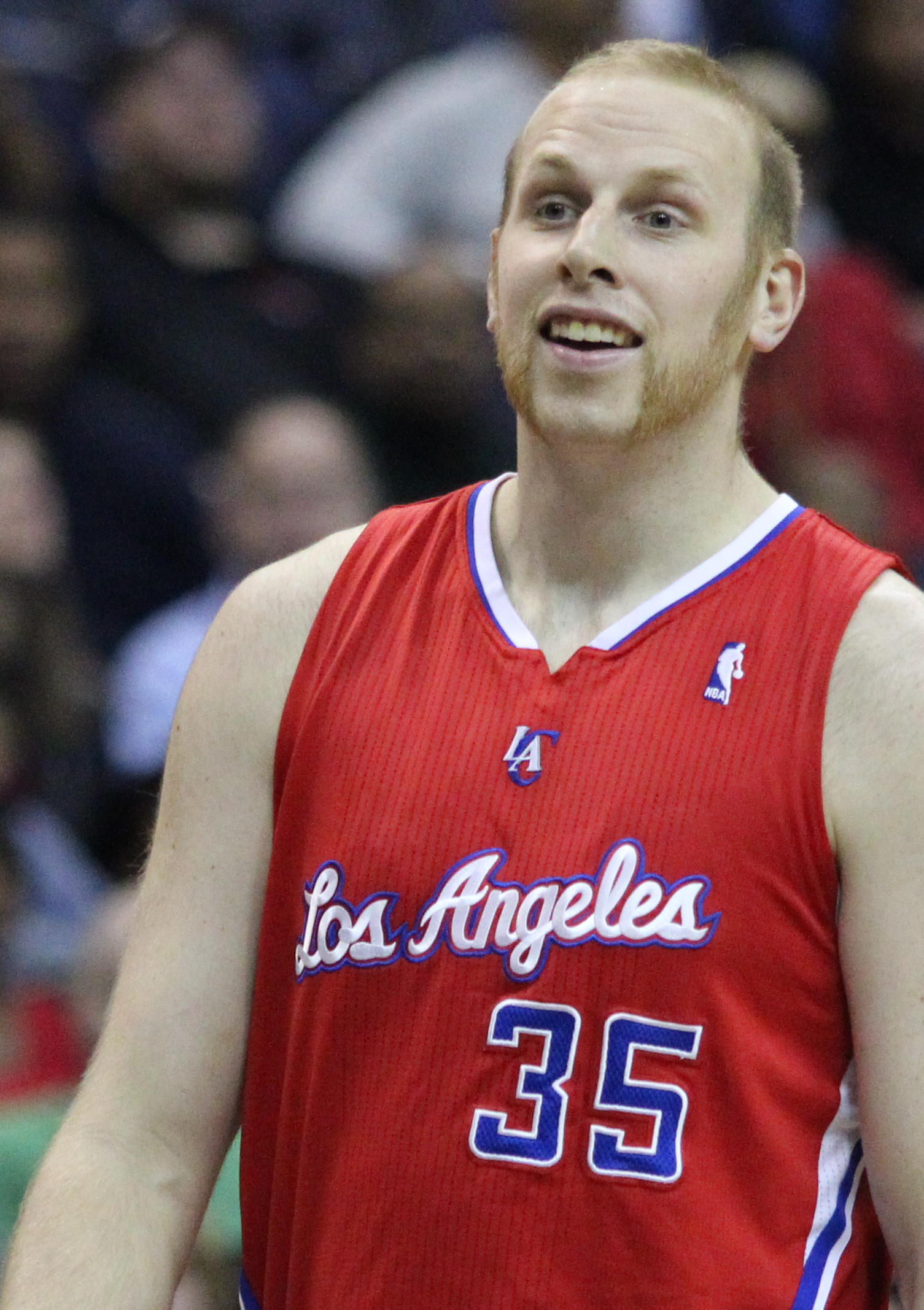
- Kaman with the Los Angeles Clippers in 2011

Personal information
- Born: April 28, 1982 (age 44) Grand Rapids, Michigan, U.S.
- Listed height: 7 ft 0 in (2.13 m)
- Listed weight: 265 lb (120 kg)

Career information
- High school: Tri-unity Christian School (Wyoming, Michigan)
- College: Central Michigan (2000–2003)
- NBA draft: 2003: 1st round, 6th overall pick
- Drafted by: Los Angeles Clippers
- Playing career: 2003–2016
- Position: Center
- Number: 35, 9

Career history
- 2003–2011: Los Angeles Clippers
- 2011–2012: New Orleans Hornets
- 2012–2013: Dallas Mavericks
- 2013–2014: Los Angeles Lakers
- 2014–2016: Portland Trail Blazers

Career highlights
- EuroBasket rebounding leader (2011); NBA All-Star (2010); MAC Player of the Year (2003); First-team All-MAC (2003); MAC tournament MVP (2003)
- Stats at NBA.com
- Stats at Basketball Reference

Christopher Zane Kaman (pronounced: KAY-men) (born April 28, 1982) is a German-American former professional basketball player. Kaman stands 7 ft 0 in (2.13 m) and played the center position. He was selected sixth overall in the first round of the 2003 NBA draft by the Los Angeles Clippers, after a college basketball career at Central Michigan University.

== High school and college career ==
Kaman attended Tri-unity Christian School in Wyoming, Michigan, leading his high school varsity to the state Class D quarterfinals in 2000, before losing to Lenawee Christian School. He went on to play for three seasons at Central Michigan University, leading them to a Mid-American Conference Championship and an NCAA tournament first-round win in 2003. He then garnered Associated Press Honorable Mention All-America honors before declaring for the 2003 NBA draft, where the Clippers selected him sixth overall. Kaman claims he decided to enter the NBA draft a year early so he could fund a chicken farm in his home state of Michigan.

== Professional career ==
=== Los Angeles Clippers (2003–2011) ===
In his rookie year, Kaman averaged 6.1 points, 5.6 rebounds, 0.89 blocks and 22.5 minutes in 82 games played (61 starts). He was the only Clipper to play all 82 games. Kaman became only the second rookie in franchise history (Michael Brooks, 1980–81) to play in all 82 games in his rookie season. He finished the season ranked second among all rookies in blocked shots per game (.89 bpg), third in field goal percentage (.460) and fourth in rebounds per game (5.6 rpg), earning the starting Center position on the NBA Rookie All-Star Team. He tallied eight points (4–7 FG) and seven rebounds in 19 minutes played, though the Rookies lost to the Sophomore team.

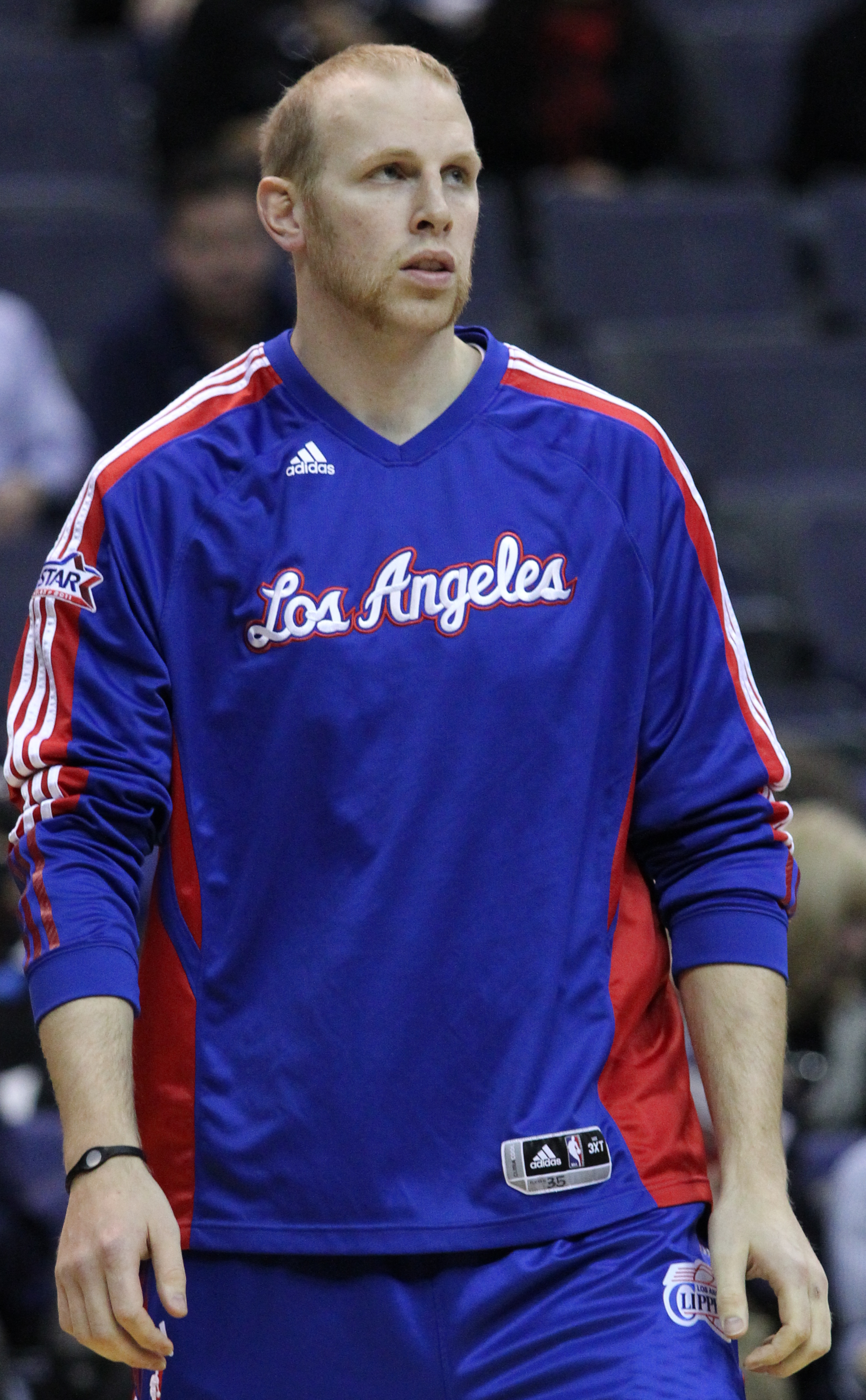
Kaman helped the Clippers to their first playoff series victory in 2006.

A year after his rookie season, Chris Kaman improved his play by averaging 9.1 points, 6.7 rebounds and 25.9 minutes in 63 games (50 starts). He had missed 12 games due to injury, including the first 11 games of the season due to a left ankle sprain. Kaman continued to create milestones in his career as he scored in double-figures in 30 games and recorded four games with 20 or more points. Kaman recorded 14 point-rebound double-doubles and led the team in rebounds in 16 games and in blocks 19 times. Despite the Clippers missing the playoffs again for the eighth year in a row, Kaman continued to show progress in his play.

By the end of the '05–'06 season, Kaman averaged 11.9 points, 9.6 rebounds and 1.38 blocks in 32.8 minutes per game, appearing in 78 games (78 starts). He missed two games with a sprained left ankle (2/27 and March 1) and one game with a sore left knee (4/16) He finished the regular season ranked 9th in the NBA in rebounds per game (9.6), 12th in FG% (.523) and 24th in blocks per game (1.38). Kaman recorded 49 games of scoring in double figures with 10 of those games scoring 20 points or more. Kaman also recorded 36 games with 10 or more rebounds. Kaman finished the season with 29 games having points-rebounds double-doubles.

The Clippers achieved their first winning record in 14 seasons and clinched their first playoff spot since 1997. By the end of the season, the Clippers finished sixth in the Western Conference, with a record of 47–35 (their best finish since the team left Buffalo), set to face the Denver Nuggets in the first round. The Clippers beat the Nuggets, but during the series against Denver, opposing player Reggie Evans reached in and yanked Kaman's testicles. Evans was later fined $10,000 for his actions. The Clippers went on to lose to the Suns in the next round.

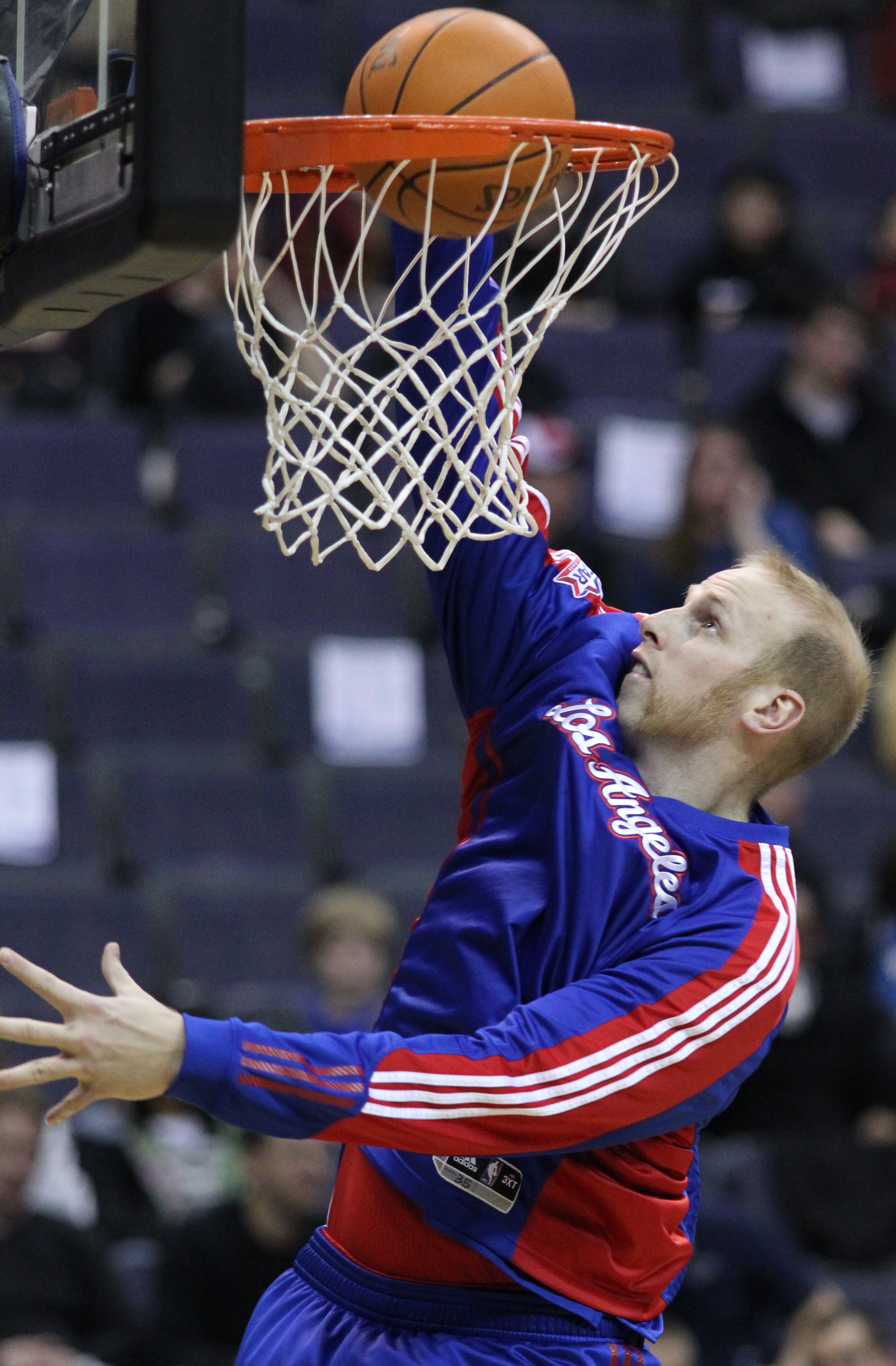
Kaman was named an NBA All-Star in 2010.

Kaman had raised his points and rebounds averages each season since he came into the league, and signed a five-year contract worth $52.5 million in October 2006. Thus 2006–2007, especially after a strong playoff run, was supposed to be a season of high expectations. However, Kaman only managed to average 10.1 points, 7.8 rebounds and 1.5 blocks in 29 minutes per game, appearing in 75 games. One possible explanation was that Kaman had been slowed down by a hamstring injury in training camp, limiting his mobility. This had resulted in a difficulty to get into a game rhythm and contribute offensively. The Clippers finished the season 40–42, missing the playoffs by one game.

After losing Shaun Livingston and Elton Brand for the majority of the 2007–08 season due to a dislocated knee and ruptured Achilles tendon, respectively, the Clippers had very little expectations to be as competitive as they were two years prior. However, Kaman emerged as one of the most dominant centers in the NBA, averaging 15.7 points, 12.7 rebounds, and 2.8 blocks per game. Although he did not play in enough games to qualify for the league's statistical leaders, his rebound and block averages would have both ranked third in the league. Kaman demonstrated his ability to perform without Brand alongside him.

Kaman was selected to his first All-Star Game as a reserve. Kaman finished the season with almost a double-double, averaging a career high 18.5 PPG and 9.3 RPG. Still, the Los Angeles Clippers finished with one of the worst records in the western conference, with a record of 29–53.

=== New Orleans Hornets (2011–2012) ===
On December 14, 2011, the Clippers traded Kaman, Al-Farouq Aminu, Eric Gordon and a 2012 first-round pick (previously acquired from the Minnesota Timberwolves) to the New Orleans Hornets in exchange for Chris Paul and two future second-round picks. In his first ever game as a Hornet, Kaman recorded 10 points and 5 rebounds. Five days later he recorded a season-high 15 rebounds.

On January 28, 2012, the Hornets announced that they were looking to trade Kaman, who was their oldest player at the time, to a contending team as they wanted to give more minutes to their younger players. They deactivated him as they searched for a trade partner, but decided to bring him back to the team after a week of being unable to find a suitable deal. In his first game back, he played 22 minutes off the bench, and had 10 points and 12 rebounds against the Kings, and followed that performance up with a 17 points, nine rebounds outing against the Bulls in 30 minutes of action.

On February 14, 2012, Kaman scored 27 points and 13 rebounds in a win over the Utah Jazz, just ahead of the trade deadline. Though observers speculated his recent performances would reopen trade discussions, New Orleans ultimately decided to keep Kaman for the rest of the season.

=== Dallas Mavericks (2012–2013) ===
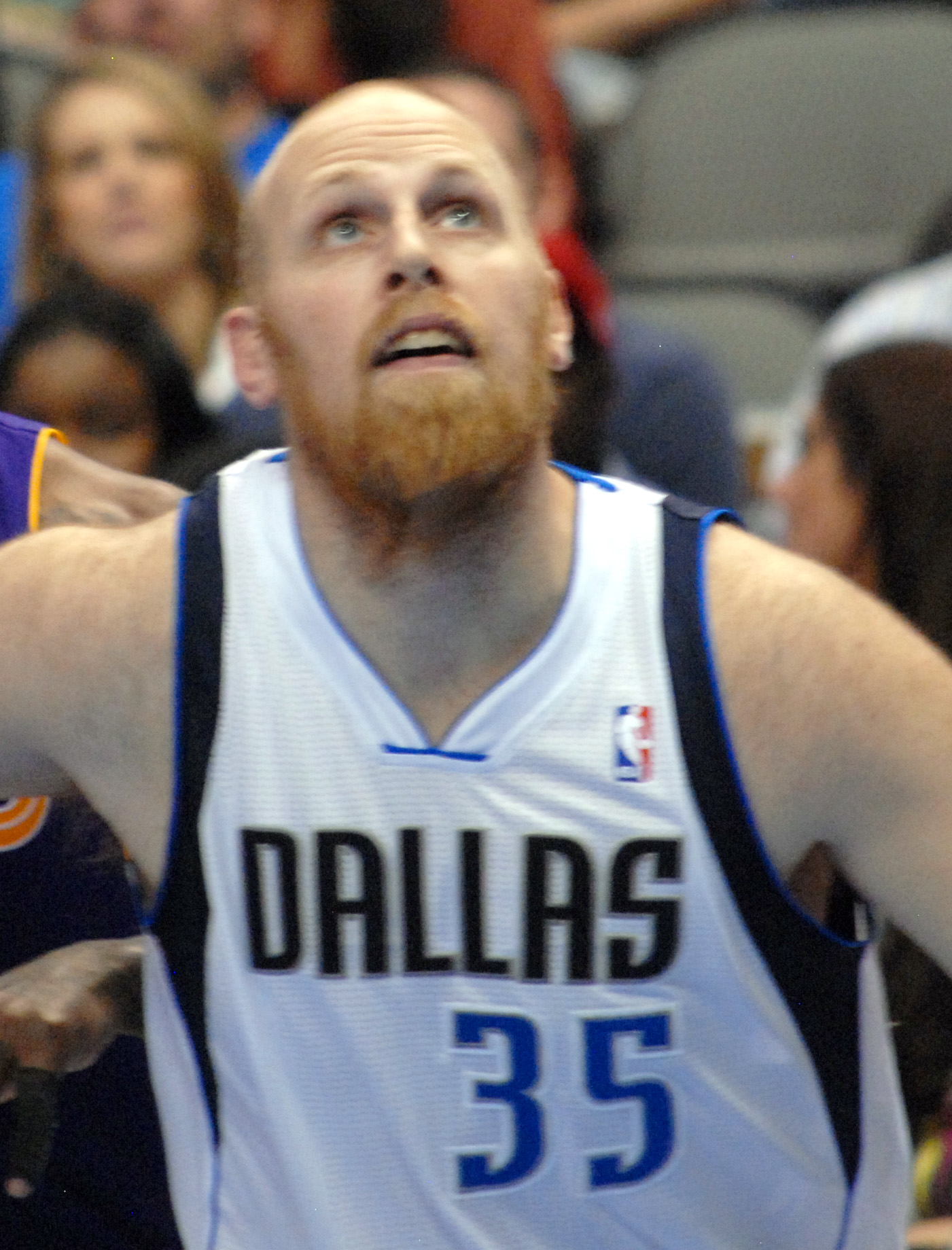
Kaman while with the Mavericks.

In July 2012, Kaman signed with the Dallas Mavericks, joining his former Olympic teammate Dirk Nowitzki. Kaman and the Mavericks agreed on a one-year deal worth 8 million dollars. He would average 10.5 points and 5.6 rebounds per game in 20.7 minutes per game in 66 games, starting 52 of them. The Mavericks finished 41–41 and missed the playoffs for the first time since the 1999–2000 season.

=== Los Angeles Lakers (2013–2014) ===
On July 12, 2013, Kaman signed a one-year deal with the Los Angeles Lakers. He managed just 39 games for the Lakers because of a crowded frontcourt and a few maladies that started (food poisoning) and a (calf strain) which ended his season. He averaged 10.4 points and 5.9 rebounds per game.

=== Portland Trail Blazers (2014–2016) ===
On July 10, 2014, Kaman signed with the Portland Trail Blazers. Kaman appeared in 74 games for Portland his first season, remaining mostly healthy as the primary backup and occasional starter behind Robin Lopez. In his second season with the Trail Blazers, Kaman played in just 16 games, also logging minutes in Portland's first-round playoff victory over the Los Angeles Clippers. Kaman made his biggest impact in the locker room, and head coach Terry Stotts was complimentary of Kaman's veteran leadership.

Kaman's final NBA game was played in Game 4 of the 2016 Western Conference First Round on April 25, 2016. In that game, the Trail Blazers would defeat the Clippers 98 – 84 with Kaman recording 1 rebound, 1 turnover and 2 fouls.

== National team career ==
Kaman played for the first time for the German national basketball team in the qualifying tournament leading up to the 2008 Beijing Olympics. In his debut with Germany, he posted a double-double with 10 points and 10 rebounds against Cape Verde. He was chosen the most valuable player by journalists.

Kaman rejoined the German national team for EuroBasket 2011.

== Personal life ==
Kaman is a dual citizen; he is a citizen of the United States and of Germany. Although he did not speak any German at the time, he acquired German citizenship in July 2008 (his great-grandparents were German), to play on the Germany national basketball team in the 2008 Beijing Olympics. Kaman belongs to the Fellowship of Christian Athletes.

On December 27, 2014, Kaman's wife, Emilie VilleMonte, gave birth to the couple's first child, a son named Barrett Christopher Kaman.

Kaman started the YouTube channel "Exploring Kaman" where he and his friends go on fishing and hunting adventures.

On July 13, 2024, Kaman played in a Gus Macker basketball tournament in Sault Ste. Marie, MI.

=== Spokesman for diagnosis of ADHD ===
In January 2008, Kaman revealed that he was misdiagnosed with Attention-deficit hyperactivity disorder at age 2½. Kaman spent much of his childhood on a farm and as a child he used to tear shingles off neighbors' rooftops and misbehave in school. His apparent ADHD affected his play in high school, and he took Ritalin to treat the condition.

== NBA career statistics ==
Legend
GP	Games played	GS	Games started	MPG	Minutes per game
FG%	Field goal percentage	3P%	3-point field goal percentage	FT%	Free throw percentage
RPG	Rebounds per game	APG	Assists per game	SPG	Steals per game
BPG	Blocks per game	PPG	Points per game	**Bold**	Career high

=== Regular season ===
Year	Team	GP	GS	MPG	FG%	3P%	FT%	RPG	APG	SPG	BPG	PPG
2003–04	L.A. Clippers	**82**	61	22.5	.460	.000	.697	5.6	1.0	.3	.9	6.1
2004–05	L.A. Clippers	63	50	25.9	.497	.000	.661	6.7	1.2	.4	1.1	9.1
2005–06	L.A. Clippers	78	**78**	32.8	.523	.000	.770	9.6	1.0	**.6**	1.4	8.9
2006–07	L.A. Clippers	75	66	29.0	.451	.000	.741	7.8	1.1	.5	1.5	10.1
2007–08	L.A. Clippers	56	55	**37.2**	.483	.000	.762	**12.7**	1.9	**.6**	**2.8**	15.7
2008–09	L.A. Clippers	31	24	29.7	**.528**	.000	.680	8.0	1.5	.5	1.5	12.0
2009–10	L.A. Clippers	76	76	34.3	.490	.000	.749	9.3	1.6	.5	1.2	**18.5**
2010–11	L.A. Clippers	32	15	26.2	.471	.000	.754	7.0	1.4	.5	1.5	12.4
2011–12	New Orleans	47	33	29.2	.446	.000	.785	7.7	**2.1**	.5	1.6	13.1
2012–13	Dallas	66	52	20.7	.507	.000	.788	5.6	.8	.4	.8	10.5
2013–14	L.A. Lakers	39	13	18.9	.509	.000	.765	5.9	1.5	.3	1.0	10.4
2014–15	Portland	74	13	18.9	.515	.000	.706	6.5	.9	.2	.7	8.6
2015–16	Portland	16	2	7.0	.465	**.250**	**1.000**	1.5	.7	.1	.1	2.8
Career		735	538	26.7	.489	.042	.743	7.6	1.3	.4	1.3	11.2
All-Star		1	0	10.7	.500	.000	.000	3.0	1.0	.0	.0	4.0

=== Playoffs ===
Year	Team	GP	GS	MPG	FG%	3P%	FT%	RPG	APG	SPG	BPG	PPG
2006	L.A. Clippers	**11**	**10**	**29.5**	**.593**	.000	.762	**8.0**	.9	**.5**	**.8**	**10.7**
2015	Portland	3	0	12.3	.500	.000	**1.000**	4.7	**1.0**	.0	.0	3.0
2016	Portland	4	0	8.0	.389	.000	.000	2.0	.3	**.5**	.0	3.5
Career		18	10	21.8	.554	.000	.773	6.1	.8	.4	.5	7.8
