= 1996–97 Illinois State Redbirds men's basketball team =

American college basketball season

1996–97 Illinois State Redbirds men's basketball

MVC regular season champion MVC tournament champion

NCAA tournament, first round
- Conference: Missouri Valley Conference
- Record: 24–6 (14–4 MVC)
- Head coach: Kevin Stallings (4th season)
- Assistant coaches: Tom Richardson; King Rice; Jeff Wulbrun
- Home arena: Redbird Arena

1996–97 Missouri Valley Conference men's basketball standings
	Conf.				Overall
Team	W		L	PCT	W		L	PCT
Illinois State †	14	–	4	.778	24	–	6	.800
Bradley	12	–	6	.667	17	–	13	.567
Southwest Missouri State	12	–	6	.667	24	–	9	.727
Northern Iowa	11	–	7	.611	16	–	12	.571
Evansville	11	–	7	.611	17	–	14	.548
Creighton	10	–	8	.556	15	–	15	.500
Wichita State	8	–	10	.444	14	–	13	.519
Southern Illinois	6	–	12	.333	13	–	17	.433
Indiana State	6	–	12	.333	12	–	16	.429
Drake	0	–	18	.000	2	–	26	.071
† 1997 MVC tournament winner Rankings from AP Poll

The 1996–97 Illinois State Redbirds men's basketball team represented Illinois State University during the 1996–97 NCAA Division I men's basketball season. The Redbirds, led by fourth year head coach Kevin Stallings, played their home games at Redbird Arena and were a member of the Missouri Valley Conference.

The Redbirds finished the season 24–6, 14–4 in conference play to finish in first place. They were the number one seed for the Missouri Valley Conference tournament. They won their quarterfinal game versus Indiana State University, semifinal game versus the University of Northern Iowa, and final game versus Southwest Missouri State University to earn the championship title.

The Redbirds received the conference automatic bid to the 1997 NCAA Division I men's basketball tournament. They were assigned to the Midwest Regional as the number eleven seed where they lost to Iowa State University in the first round.

== Roster ==
1996–97 Illinois State Redbirds men's basketball team
Players
Coaches

Pos.	#	Name	Height	Weight	Year	Hometown
C	35	Rob Gibbons	6 ft 10 in (2.08 m)	—	RS Jr	Rockaway, NJ
G	11	Steve Hansell	6 ft 4 in (1.93 m)	—	Jr	Birmingham, England
F	44	Dan Muller	6 ft 6 in (1.98 m)	—	Jr	Lafayette, IN
G	13	Skipp Schaefbauer	6 ft 3 in (1.91 m)	—	Jr	Elk River, MN
G	15	Jamar Smiley	5 ft 11 in (1.8 m)	—	Jr	West Hempstead, NY
F	23	Kenneth Pierson	6 ft 8 in (2.03 m)	—	RS So	Conroe, TX
C	32	LeRoy Watkins	6 ft 7 in (2.01 m)	—	RS So	Chicago, IL
G	24	Kyle Cartmill	6 ft 0 in (1.83 m)	—	So	Quincy, IL
F	42	Rico Hill	6 ft 6 in (1.98 m)	—	So	Calumet Park, IL
F	14	Ben Holmstrom	6 ft 8 in (2.03 m)	—	So	Rockford, IL
C	33	Ronald vanVelzen	6 ft 10 in (2.08 m)	—	So	Noordwijk, Netherlands
F	25	Ryan Crowley	6 ft 5 in (1.96 m)	—	Fr	Naperville, IL
F	30	Joe Hein	6 ft 7 in (2.01 m)	—	Fr	Northbrook, IL
F	50	Khalil Ourguis	6 ft 9 in (2.06 m)	—	Fr	Namur, Belgium
G	22	Nic Stotler	6 ft 0 in (1.83 m)	—	Fr	Brighton, IL

Head coach

- Kevin Stallings (Purdue)

Assistant coach(es)

- King Rice (North Carolina)
- Tom Richardson (Saint Xavier)
- Jeff Wulbrun (Cal State Fullerton)

Legend

- (C) Team captain
- (S) Suspended
- (I) Ineligible
- (W) Walk-on
- Injured
- Current redshirt

== Schedule ==
Date time, TV	Rank^{#}	Opponent^{#}	Result	Record	High points	High rebounds	High assists	Site (attendance) city, state
Exhibition Season
November 11, 1996*		New Castle (Australia)	W 79–69		22 – Watkins	12 – Watkins	6 – Schaefbauer	Redbird Arena; Normal, IL
November 19, 1996*		Converse All–Stars	W 87–79		19 – Hill	–	–	Redbird Arena; Normal, IL
Regular Season
November 24, 1996*		at Pittsburgh	W 69–50	1–0	16 – Schaefbauer	8 – Hill	8 – Smiley	Fitzgerald Field House (6,482); Pittsburgh, PA
November 30, 1996*		Eastern Kentucky	W 87–64	2–0	19 – Schaefbauer	10 – Hill	10 – Smiley	Redbird Arena (8,740); Normal, IL
December 4, 1996*		vs. DePaul	W 75–50	3–0	23 – Hill	6 – Schaefbauer	9 – Smiley	Kiel Center (13,625); St. Louis, MO
December 7, 1996*		Ohio	W 81–69	4–0	17 – Hill	7 – Muller, Hill	9 – Smiley	Redbird Arena (8,153); Normal, IL
December 14, 1996*		at Duquesne	L 64–91	4–1	14 – Watkins	7 – Muller, Watkins, Hill	4 – Smiley	A. J. Palumbo Center (3,654); Pittsburgh, PA
December 18, 1996*		at Northwestern	W 67–47	5–1	16 – Muller	7 – Hill	6 – Schaefbauer	Welsh–Ryan Arena (3,423); Evanston, IL
December 21, 1996*		at Wisconsin–Green Bay	W 71–61	6–1	25 – Hill	7 – Smiley	6 – Smiley	Brown County Veterans Memorial Arena (4,188); Ashwaubenon, WI
December 23, 1996*		Illinois–Chicago	W 78–58	7–1	21 – Schaefbauer	14 – Hill	9 – Smiley	Redbird Arena (9,005); Normal, IL
December 29, 1996; 7:05 pm		at Creighton	W 54–45	8–1 (1–0)	17 – Schaefbauer	15 – Hill	7 – Smiley	Omaha Civic Auditorium (4,959); Omaha, NE
January 4, 1997; 1:30 pm, ESPN2		Evansville	W 80–67	9–1 (2–0)	21 – Hill	10 – Hill	5 – Smiley	Redbird Arena (8,088); Normal, IL
January 9, 1997		Northern Iowa	L 71–77 ^{OT}	9–2 (2–1)	21 – Hill	7 – Hill	9 – Smiley	Redbird Arena (6,291); Normal, IL
January 12, 1997		at Southern Illinois	W 76–70	10–2 (3–1)	15 – Muller	6 – Watkins	6 – Schaefbauer	SIU Arena (4,212); Carbondale, IL
January 16, 1997		Indiana State	W 101–58	11–2 (4–1)	23 – Hill	7 – Cartmill	14 – Smiley	Redbird Arena (7,834); Normal, IL
January 19, 1997		at Evansville	W 67–53	12–2 (5–1)	19 – Watkins	12 – Watkins	7 – Smiley	Roberts Municipal Stadium (8,412); Evansville, IN
January 22, 1997		at Northern Iowa	L 88–93 ^{2OT}	12–3 (5–2)	25 – Hill	6 – Muller	8 – Smiley	UNI Dome (2,592); Cedar Falls, IA
January 25, 1997; 7:05 pm		Wichita State	W 79–71	13–3 (6–2)	14 – Muller	9 – Hill	4 – Hansell	Redbird Arena (9,821); Normal, IL
January 27, 1997		Southwest Missouri State	W 95–84	14–3 (7–2)	37 – Hill	13 – Hill	10 – Smiley	Redbird Arena (7,065); Normal, IL
February 1, 1997; MVC-TV		Bradley	W 69–67	15–3 (8–2)	21 – Hill	9 – Hill	10 – Smiley	Redbird Arena (10,348); Normal, IL
February 3, 1997		at Drake	W 73–65	16–3 (9–2)	27 – Schaefbauer	13 – Hill	4 – Hansell, Hill	The Knapp Center (3,180); Des Moines, IA
February 8, 1997; 7:35 pm		at Wichita State	W 62–53	17–3 (10–2)	17 – Watkins	9 – Hill	5 – Smiley	Henry Levitt Arena (10,545); Wichita, KS
February 10, 1997		at Southwest Missouri State	L 66–79	17–4 (10–3)	18 – Schaefbauer	10 – Hill	5 – Schaefbauer, Smiley	John Q. Hammons Student Center (7,764); Springfield, MO
February 13, 1997		Southern Illinois	W 82–77	18–4 (11–3)	32 – Hill	11 – Hill	9 – Smiley	Redbird Arena (8,187); Normal, IL
February 15, 1997		Drake	W 82–51	19–4 (12–3)	19 – Muller	7 – vanVelzen	9 – Smiley	Redbird Arena (9,755); Normal, IL
February 18, 1997		at Indiana State	W 78-68	20–4 (13–3)	24 – Hill	8 – Hill	7 – Smiley	Hulman Center (4,217); Terre Haute, IN
February 22, 1997; MVC-TV		at Bradley	L 64–69	20–5 (13–4)	18 – Hill	8 – Watkins	5 – Smiley	Carver Arena (11,207); Peoria, IL
February 24, 1997; 7:05 pm		Creighton	W 74–69	21–5 (14–4)	23 – Hill	8 – Hill	10 – Smiley	Redbird Arena (8,374); Normal, IL
Missouri Valley Conference {MVC} tournament
March 1, 1997	(1)	(9) Indiana State; Quarterfinal	W 72–58	22–5	21 – Hill	9 – Muller	10 – Smiley	Kiel Center (9,594); St. Louis, MO
March 2, 1997	(1)	(4) Northern Iowa; Semifinal	W 69–65	23–5	29 – Hill	7 – Hill	5 – Smiley	Kiel Center (13,329); St. Louis, MO
March 3, 1997; 8:30 pm, ESPN	(1)	(3) Southwest Missouri State; Final	W 75–72	24–5	31 – Hill	8 – Muller	4 – Hansell, Schaefbauer, Smiley	Kiel Center (9,751); St. Louis, MO
National Collegiate Athletic Association {NCAA} tournament
March 13, 1997; 2:00 pm, CBS	(11)	vs. (6) No. 18 Iowa State; Midwest Region [First Round]	L 57–69	24–6	14 – Hill	14 – Hill	12 – Smiley	The Palace of Auburn Hills (21,020); Auburn Hills, MI
*Non-conference game. ^{#}Rankings from AP Poll. (#) Tournament seedings in parentheses. All times are in Central Standard Time.
