= 1997 Missouri Valley Conference men's basketball tournament =

- Classification: Division I
- Season: 1996–97
- Teams: 10
- Site: Kiel Center; St. Louis, Missouri
- Champions: Illinois State (3rd title)
- Winning coach: Kevin Stallings (1st title)
- MVP: Rico Hill (Illinois State)

1996–97 Missouri Valley Conference men's basketball standings
| | Conf. | | | | Overall |
| Team | W | | L | PCT | W | | L | PCT |
|---|---|---|---|---|---|---|---|---|
| Illinois State † | 14 | – | 4 | .778 | 24 | – | 6 | .800 |
| Bradley | 12 | – | 6 | .667 | 17 | – | 13 | .567 |
| Southwest Missouri State | 12 | – | 6 | .667 | 24 | – | 9 | .727 |
| Northern Iowa | 11 | – | 7 | .611 | 16 | – | 12 | .571 |
| Evansville | 11 | – | 7 | .611 | 17 | – | 14 | .548 |
| Creighton | 10 | – | 8 | .556 | 15 | – | 15 | .500 |
| Wichita State | 8 | – | 10 | .444 | 14 | – | 13 | .519 |
| Southern Illinois | 6 | – | 12 | .333 | 13 | – | 17 | .433 |
| Indiana State | 6 | – | 12 | .333 | 12 | – | 16 | .429 |
| Drake | 0 | – | 18 | .000 | 2 | – | 26 | .071 |
† 1997 MVC tournament winner Rankings from AP Poll

The 1997 Missouri Valley Conference men's basketball tournament was played after the conclusion of the 1996–1997 regular season at the Kiel Center in St. Louis, Missouri.

The Illinois State Redbirds defeated the Southwest Missouri State Bears in the championship game, 75–72, and as a result won their 3rd MVC Tournament title and earned an automatic bid to the 1997 NCAA tournament. Rico Hill of Illinois State was named the tournament MVP.

== Tournament Bracket ==
Opening Round; February 28, 1997
8 | Southern Illinois | 71
9 | Indiana State | 86
7 | Wichita State | 63
10 | Drake | 74

Quarterfinals; March 1, 1997
1 | Illinois State | 72
9 | Indiana State | 58
4 | Northern Iowa | 73
5 | Evansville | 65
2 | Bradley | 66
10 | Drake | 47
3 | Southwest Missouri State | 77
6 | Creighton | 58

Semifinals; March 2, 1997
1 | Illinois State | 69
4 | Northern Iowa | 65
2 | Bradley | 58
3 | Southwest Missouri State | 60

Final; March 3, 1997
1 | Illinois State | 75
3 | Southwest Missouri State | 72

== See also ==
- Missouri Valley Conference
