= Kevin Stallings =

American college basketball coach (born 1960)

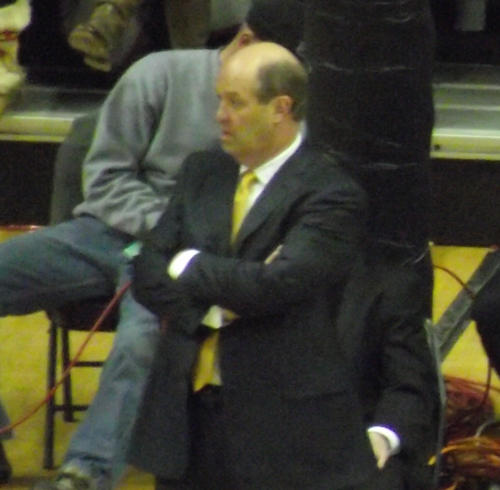
- Stallings in 2010

Biographical details
- Born: October 1, 1960 (age 66); Collinsville, Illinois, U.S.

Playing career
- 1978–1979: Belleville JC
- 1979–1982: Purdue

Coaching career (HC unless noted)
- 1982–1988: Purdue (assistant)
- 1988–1993: Kansas (assistant)
- 1993–1999: Illinois State
- 1999–2016: Vanderbilt
- 2016–2018: Pittsburgh

Head coaching record
- Overall: 479–324
- Tournaments: 6–9 (NCAA Division I); 8–7 (NIT)

Accomplishments and honors

Championships
- 2 MVC regular season (1997, 1998); 2 MVC tournament (1997, 1998); SEC tournament (2012)

Awards
- MVC Coach of the Year (1998); 2× SEC Coach of the Year (2007, 2010)

Kevin Eugene Stallings (born October 1, 1960) is an American former basketball coach, who formerly served as the head coach at Illinois State University, Vanderbilt University and the University of Pittsburgh. He was an assistant coach at Purdue University and the University of Kansas.

== Playing career ==
Stallings was born in Collinsville, Illinois. He graduated from Collinsville High School in Collinsville, Illinois in 1978, where he played guard (6'5", 190 lbs.) for four years under legendary coach Vergil Fletcher and won three conference championships. The Kahoks went 30–1 his junior season and lost to De La Salle in the first round of the Illinois state tournament, 67–66. In his senior season, the Kahoks finished 28–3 and finished third in the state tournament. They lost in the semi-finals 55–53 to eventual champion Lockport Central, who finished the season 33–0. Stallings still holds Collinsville records for career assists (665), season assists (284) and season steals (146). Stallings was named All-State following his junior (1976–77) and senior (1977–78) seasons.

After a year at Belleville Area College in Belleville, Illinois, where his team went 28–9 and made the NJCAA tournament, Stallings enrolled at Purdue and played three years. His first season, the Boilermakers finished with a 27–8 record under coach Lee Rose and reached the NCAA Final Four. Purdue reached the NIT Final Four in Stallings’ junior and senior seasons, Gene Keady's first two seasons at the helm of the Boilermakers. Stallings started 17 games his senior season and averaged 4.3 points and 2.6 assists per game.

Stallings received a bachelor's degree in business management in 1982 and a master's degree in counseling in 1984, both from Purdue.

== Assistant coaching jobs ==
=== Purdue ===
After graduation in 1982, Stallings began as assistant coach at Purdue under Gene Keady. From 1982 to 1988, Purdue amassed a 140–44 record, winning three Big Ten Championships (two shared and one outright) and reaching the NCAA Tournament all six years. The highlight was a Sweet Sixteen appearance in 1988, when the Boilermakers finished 29–4 and earned a number one seed in the NCAA Tournament.

=== Kansas ===
In the summer of 1988, Stallings was hired by Roy Williams, who had taken over at Kansas after Larry Brown's surprising NCAA Tournament championship. During the next five seasons, the Jayhawks compiled a 132–38 record and reached four NCAA Tournaments. They advanced to the Final Four twice. In 1991, they lost to Duke in the finals, 72–65, while in 1993, they lost in the semifinals to North Carolina, 78–68.

== Head coaching jobs ==
=== Illinois State ===
In 1993, Stallings became the 15th head coach at Illinois State following Bob Bender's move to the University of Washington. The Redbirds went 123–63 during his six-year tenure and reached the NCAA Tournament and the NIT twice each. His winning percentage of .661 is the highest ever by an Illinois State coach who coached at least five years.

Following a 16–11 (Missouri Valley Conference: 12–6, 4th) record his first season, Stallings led Illinois State a 20–13 record (MVC: 13–5, 2nd) in his second year. They lost to Washington State 83–80 in the second round of the 1995 NIT. In 1995–96, the Redbirds (22–12 overall, 13–5 MVC) again finished second in the MVC and advanced to the quarterfinals of the NIT, where they lost to Tulane 83–72.

In 1996–97, Illinois State (24–6, 14–4) won the Missouri Valley Conference regular season title and tournament to reach the NCAA tournament for the first time since 1990. The Redbirds lost to Iowa State in the first round 69–57 in Auburn Hills, Michigan.

In 1997–98, led by MVC player of the year Rico Hill (18.4 ppg, 7.5 rpg) and Dan Muller (13.0 ppg, 5.3 rpg), Illinois State (25–6, 16–2) swept the MVC regular season and tournament titles for the second consecutive year. The Redbirds beat Tennessee 82–81 in overtime in the first round of the NCAA tournament in Sacramento, California, before losing to 4th-ranked Arizona in the second round 82–49. Following the season, Stallings was named MVC coach of the year. After losing four starters, the Redbirds fell back to 16–15 (MVC: 7–11, 7th) in Stallings’ final year.

=== Vanderbilt ===
Stallings became head coach at Vanderbilt in 1999, replacing Jan van Breda Kolff. In his first season, the Commodores rebounded from a 14–15 record to finish 19–11 (Southeastern Conference: 8–8). They were led by SEC Player of the Year Dan Langhi, who led the SEC with 22.1 points per game.

The Commodores slipped to 15–15 (SEC: 4–12) in 2000–01 and missed the postseason, although Matt Freije became only the fifth Commodore to be named to the SEC All-Freshman team.

In 2001–02, they improved marginally to 17–15 (SEC: 6–10). Wins at Tennessee and against No. 11 Kentucky in the final week helped Vanderbilt secure an NIT berth. They beat Houston 59–50 in the opening round before losing in the next. Freije earned third-team All-SEC honors, and Brian Thornton became the sixth Commodore to be named to the SEC All-Freshman team.

In 2002–03, Stallings suffered the first losing season of his career, when the Commodores slumped to 11–18 (SEC: 3–13). Freije was named second-team All-SEC by the league's coaches.

In 2003–04, Stallings led the Commodores to a 23–10 record (SEC: 8–8) and the Sweet Sixteen of the NCAA tournament. The Commodores had a 66–60 regular season win over No. 4 Kentucky and knocked off No. 9 Mississippi State in the SEC Tournament before losing to Florida in the semi-finals. In the NCAA tournament, Vanderbilt received a No. 6 seed and defeated Western Michigan 71–58 in the first round. In the second round, the Commodores trailed third-seeded North Carolina State 67–56 with 3:45 to play, but Freije keyed a 19–6 Vanderbilt run to end the game for a 75–73 win. Vanderbilt lost to eventual national champion Connecticut 73–53 in the Sweet Sixteen. Freije (18.4 ppg, 5.4 rpg) was named first-team All-SEC and finished as Vanderbilt's leading all-time scorer (1,891 points).

In 2004–05, the Commodores narrowly missed the NCAA tournament, finishing 20–14 (SEC: 8–8). Vanderbilt beat Indiana and Wichita State in the NIT before losing to Memphis in the quarterfinals, 81–68. Shan Foster became the seventh Commodore to be named to the SEC All-Freshman team and the third during Stallings’ tenure.

In 2005–06, Vanderbilt finished 17–13 (SEC: 7–9) and lost to Notre Dame 79–69 in the first round of the NIT. Foster was named first-team All-SEC.

In 2006–07, Vanderbilt had a 22–12 record (SEC East: 10–6, 2nd) and reached the Sweet 16 of the NCAA tournament. Following the end of the regular season, Stallings was named SEC coach of the year by his fellow SEC coaches, while senior Derrick Byars was named SEC player of the year.

In 2007–08, Vanderbilt won its first 16 games of the season en route to a 26–8 record (10–6 SEC). After going 2–4 to start conference play, the Commodores notched seven straight wins, including a victory over then-No. 1 Tennessee, the second straight season Stallings defeated a top-ranked team. Vanderbilt received a No. 4 seed in the NCAA Tournament. However, 13th-seeded Siena routed the Commodores in the first round, 83–62. Shan Foster became the school's all-time leading scorer and was named the 2008 SEC Player of the Year by the SEC's coaches and the Associated Press.

In 2008–09, Stallings had four freshmen playing significant minutes on one of the youngest rosters in the nation. In a down year for the SEC, the Commodores went 19–12 (8–8 in conference play) but did not receive a bid to the NCAA Tournament or the NIT at the season's end.

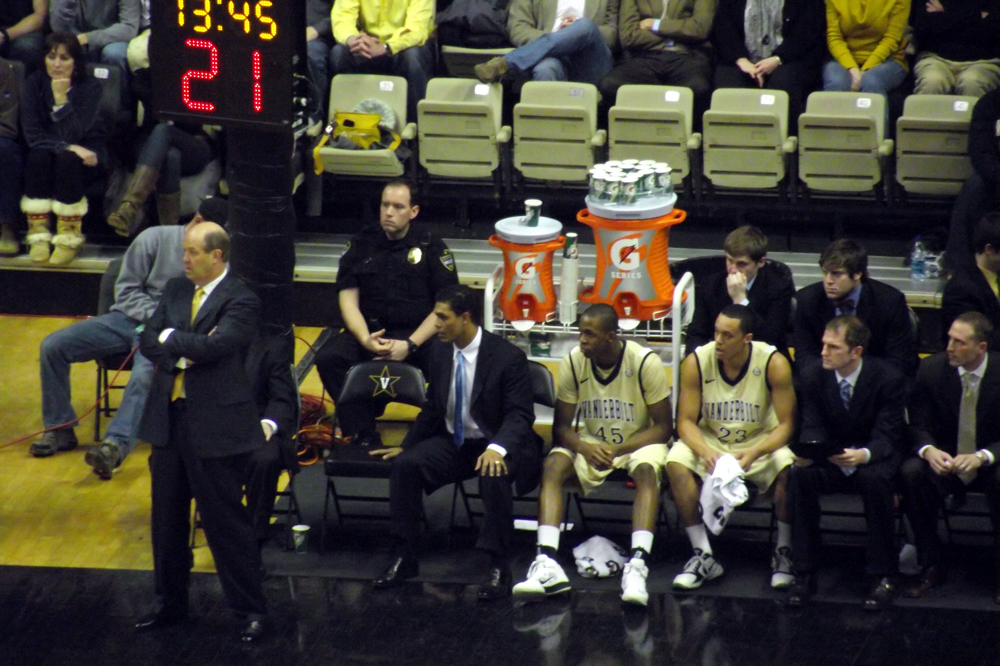
Stallings near the Commodores bench during a game

The 2009–10 season represented a bounceback for the Commodores, who rattled off 10 straight victories after a 6–3 start and went on to post a 12–4 record in SEC play, the best-ever under Stallings. This included season sweeps of Florida and Tennessee, and Vanderbilt finished second in the SEC East behind Kentucky. At 24–8, the Commodores again received a No. 4 seed in the NCAA Tournament, but were again shocked, this time by 13th-seeded Murray State, 66–65. Three NCAA bids in four years was Vanderbilt's best postseason run since the early 1990s. Jermaine Beal was named First Team All-SEC after leading Vanderbilt in scoring and assists, and Stallings was named SEC Coach of the Year for the second time in four seasons.

In 2010–11, Stallings led Vanderbilt to a 23–11 overall record, 9–7 in the SEC. After earning a 5 seed, however, another season-ending upset ensued in the NCAA tournament, as 12th seeded Richmond knocked Vanderbilt out of the tournament in the second round.

The 2011–12 team was widely considered Vanderbilt's strongest under Stallings, with his typical makeup of a strong outside shooting presence and a powerful post man inside. Vanderbilt advanced to its first SEC Tournament final since 1951, defeating #1 and eventual national champion Kentucky by a score of 71–64. The season ended in the NCAA tournament at the hands of Wisconsin in the third round after the Commodores defeated Harvard 79–70 in the second round.

With a victory over Lipscomb on November 15, 2013, Stallings passed Roy Skinner as the winningest coach in Vanderbilt history.

Vanderbilt made their first NCAA tournament in four years in 2015–16, but suffered a disappointing 20-point loss to Wichita State in the First Four.

=== Pittsburgh ===
On March 27, 2016, amid a backlash from fans, it was announced that Stallings was hired as head basketball coach at the University of Pittsburgh. Despite returning 6 of the top 7 players from the previous year (including 2 eventual NBA players), Pitt finished the 2016–17 season with their first losing record in 17 years. The campaign featured an 8-game losing streak, including a lopsided 55 point loss to the Louisville Cardinals where Kevin Stallings was ejected after receiving 2 technical fouls. Prior to the regular season finale, Kevin Stallings dismissed freshman guard, Justice Kithcart, for conduct detrimental to the team. Pitt finished tied for 13th place in the ACC (4–14) which was below their projected pre-season ACC ranking. They were eliminated in the 2nd round of the 2017 ACC tournament as the 14th seed by Virginia after upsetting Georgia Tech in the 1st round. In the 1st-round game against Georgia Tech, controversy again surrounded Kevin Stallings as he was heard using obscenities directed towards Pitt's Ryan Luther while Sheldon Jeter, whom Stallings had previously blocked from transferring to Pitt from Vanderbilt, was injured and lying on the floor. Less than a week after the end of the season, Crisshawn Clark and Corey Manigault announced they would be transferring, leaving no remaining players from the 2016 recruiting class.

During the 2017–18 season, controversy struck again when on January 2, 2018, in the final minutes of a game Pitt was losing to Louisville, Coach Stallings was overheard saying to a fan "At least we don't pay our players $100,000" (a reference to the Louisville basketball scandal). Pitt fired Stallings on March 8, 2018. He left with the worst winning percentage of any non-interim coach in Pitt history.

On March 9, 2018, it was reported that Stallings retired from coaching. He was issued a three year show-cause penalty by the NCAA on February 20, 2020, for exceeding the number of permissible coaches on his staff and lying to Pitt officials about it. He allowed three basketball staffers to perform coaching duties, then implemented an alert system to keep the staffers from being caught. He even went as far as to delete video footage in order to deceive Pitt officials. The show-cause penalty ran until February 19, 2023; if Stallings got another coaching job during this time, he would have been suspended for the first 30 percent of the first season of his return.

== Head coaching record ==
Record table
Season	Team	Overall	Conference	Standing	Postseason
Illinois State Redbirds (Missouri Valley Conference) (1993–1999)
1993–94	Illinois State	16–11	12–6	4th	
1994–95	Illinois State	20–13	13–5	T–2nd	NIT Second Round
1995–96	Illinois State	22–12	13–5	2nd	NIT Second Round
1996–97	Illinois State	24–6	14–4	1st	NCAA Division I Round of 64
1997–98	Illinois State	25–6	16–2	1st	NCAA Division I Round of 32
1998–99	Illinois State	16–15	7–11	7th	
Illinois State:		123–63 (.661)	75–33 (.694)		
Vanderbilt Commodores (Southeastern Conference) (1999–2016)
1999–00	Vanderbilt	19–11	8–8	4th (East)	NIT First Round
2000–01	Vanderbilt	15–15	4–12	6th (East)	
2001–02	Vanderbilt	17–15	6–10	T–5th (East)	NIT Second Round
2002–03	Vanderbilt	11–18	3–13	6th (East)	
2003–04	Vanderbilt	23–10	8–8	T–3rd (East)	NCAA Division I Sweet 16
2004–05	Vanderbilt	20–14	8–8	3rd (East)	NIT Quarterfinal
2005–06	Vanderbilt	17–13	7–9	4th (East)	NIT First Round
2006–07	Vanderbilt	22–12	10–6	2nd (East)	NCAA Division I Sweet 16
2007–08	Vanderbilt	26–8	10–6	3rd (East)	NCAA Division I Round of 64
2008–09	Vanderbilt	19–12	8–8	T–4th (East)	
2009–10	Vanderbilt	24–9	12–4	2nd (East)	NCAA Division I Round of 64
2010–11	Vanderbilt	23–11	9–7	T–3rd (East)	NCAA Division I Round of 64
2011–12	Vanderbilt	25–11	10–6	T–2nd	NCAA Division I Round of 32
2012–13	Vanderbilt	16–17	8–10	10th	
2013–14	Vanderbilt	15–16	7–11	T–10th	
2014–15	Vanderbilt	21–14	9–9	7th	NIT Quarterfinal
2015–16	Vanderbilt	19–14	11–7	T–3rd	NCAA Division I First Four
Vanderbilt:		332–220 (.601)	138–142 (.493)		
Pittsburgh Panthers (Atlantic Coast Conference) (2016–2018)
2016–17	Pittsburgh	16–17	4–14	T–13th	
2017–18	Pittsburgh	8–24	0–18	15th	
Pittsburgh:		24–41 (.369)	4–32 (.111)		
Total:		479–324 (.597)	217–207 (.512)		
National champion Postseason invitational champion Conference regular season champion Conference regular season and conference tournament champion Division regular season champion Division regular season and conference tournament champion Conference tournament champion

== Personal life ==
His son, Jacob Stallings, plays catcher in Major League Baseball.
