= 1997 MAC men's basketball tournament =

- Classification: Division I
- Season: 1996–97
- Teams: 8
- Site: SeaGate Centre; Toledo, Ohio
- Champions: Miami (3rd title)
- Winning coach: Charlie Coles (1st title)
- MVP: Devin Davis (Miami)
- MAC men's basketball tournaments

1996–97 Mid-American Conference men's basketball standings
	Conf.				Overall
Team	W		L	PCT	W		L	PCT
Bowling Green	13	–	5	.722	22	–	10	.688
Miami†	13	–	5	.722	21	–	9	.700
Ohio	12	–	6	.667	17	–	10	.630
Eastern Michigan	11	–	7	.611	22	–	10	.688
Ball State	9	–	9	.500	16	–	13	.552
Western Michigan	9	–	9	.500	14	–	14	.500
Kent State	7	–	11	.389	9	–	18	.333
Toledo	6	–	12	.333	13	–	14	.481
Akron	6	–	12	.333	8	–	18	.308
Central Michigan	4	–	14	.222	7	–	19	.269
† 1997 MAC tournament winner Rankings from AP Poll

The 1997 MAC men's basketball tournament, a part of the 1996–97 NCAA Division I men's basketball season, took place at SeaGate Centre in Toledo, Ohio. Its winner received the Mid-American Conference's automatic bid to the 1997 NCAA tournament. It was a single-elimination tournament with three rounds and the top eight MAC teams invited to participate. No teams received byes in the tournament. Bowling Green received the number one seed in the tournament.

== Tournament ==
=== Seeds ===
1. Bowling Green
2. Miami
3. Ohio
4. Eastern Michigan
5. Ball State
6. Western Michigan
7. Kent State
8. Toledo

=== Bracket ===
Quarterfinals
1	Bowling Green	94
8	Toledo	69
4	Eastern Michigan	85
5	Ball State	75
3	Ohio	68
6	Western Michigan	74
2	Miami	75
7	Kent State	65

Semifinals
1	Bowling Green	64
4	Eastern Michigan	73
6	Western Michigan	67
2	Miami	84

Finals
4	Eastern Michigan	76
2	Miami	96

* Overtime period
