= 1986–87 Central Michigan Chippewas men's basketball team =

American college basketball season

1986–87 Central Michigan Chippewas men's basketball

MAC Regular season champions MAC tournament champions

NCAA tournament, First Round
- Conference: Mid-American Conference
- West
- Record: 22–8 (14–2 MAC)
- Head coach: Charlie Coles (2nd season)
- Home arena: Daniel P. Rose Center

1986–87 Mid-American Conference men's basketball standings
	Conf.				Overall
Team	W		L	PCT	W		L	PCT
Central Michigan†	14	–	2	.875	22	–	8	.733
Kent State	11	–	5	.688	19	–	10	.655
Bowling Green	10	–	6	.625	15	–	14	.517
Eastern Michigan	8	–	8	.500	14	–	15	.483
Miami	7	–	9	.438	14	–	14	.500
Ohio	7	–	9	.438	14	–	14	.500
Western Michigan	7	–	9	.438	12	–	16	.429
Toledo	4	–	12	.250	11	–	17	.393
Ball State	4	–	12	.250	9	–	18	.333
† Mid-American Conference tournament winner Rankings from AP Poll

The 1986–87 Central Michigan Chippewas men's basketball team represented Central Michigan University as a member of the Mid-American Conference during the 1986–87 NCAA Division I men's basketball season. The team was led by head coach Charlie Coles and played their home games at the Daniel P. Rose Center. After finishing atop the MAC regular season standings, the Chippewas won the MAC tournament to earn an automatic bid to the NCAA tournament as No. 13 seed in the West region. Central Michigan lost to No. 4 seed UCLA in the opening round. The team finished with a record of 22–8 (14–2 MAC).

== Roster ==
1986–87 Central Michigan Chippewas men's basketball team
Players
Coaches

Pos.	#	Name	Height	Weight	Year	Hometown
F	14	Jim Murray	6 ft 5 in (1.96 m)	—	Sr
G	22	Ervin Leavy	6 ft 3 in (1.91 m)	190 lb (86 kg)	Sr		Flint, Michigan
F		Daryl Miller	6 ft 8 in (2.03 m)	—	Jr
G/F	44	Dan Majerle	6 ft 6 in (1.98 m)	215 lb (98 kg)	Jr	Traverse City	Traverse City, Michigan

Head coach

- Charlie Coles

Assistant coach(es)

Legend

- (C) Team captain
- (S) Suspended
- (I) Ineligible
- (W) Walk-on
- Injured
- Current redshirt

== Schedule and results ==
Date time, TV	Rank^{#}	Opponent^{#}	Result	Record	Site city, state
Non-conference regular season
Dec 1, 1986*		Tri-State	W 100–54	1–0	Rose Arena; Mount Pleasant, Michigan
Dec 3, 1986*		at Michigan	L 56–76	1–1	Crisler Arena; Ann Arbor, Michigan
Dec 6, 1986*		Wisconsin	W 80–66	2–1	Rose Arena; Mount Pleasant, Michigan
Dec 11, 1986*		at No. 8 Western Kentucky	W 73–65	3–1	E.A. Diddle Arena; Bowling Green, Kentucky
Dec 15, 1986*		Oakland	W 68–51	4–1	Rose Arena; Mount Pleasant, Michigan
Dec 18, 1986*		at California	L 57–70	4–2	Harmon Gym; Berkeley, California
Dec 19, 1986*		at Saint Mary's	L 39–55	4–3	McKeon Pavilion; Moraga, California
Dec 23, 1986*		Grand Valley State	W 89–47	5–3	Rose Arena; Mount Pleasant, Michigan
Dec 29, 1986*		at Notre Dame	L 54–55	5–4	Joyce Center; Notre Dame, Indiana
MAC Regular Season
Dec 31, 1986		Kent State	W 75–58	6–4 (1–0)	Rose Arena; Mount Pleasant, Michigan
Jan 3, 1987		Bowling Green	W 73–61	7–4 (2–0)	Rose Arena; Mount Pleasant, Michigan
Jan 7, 1987		at Ball State	L 79–81	7–5 (2–1)	Irving Gymnasium; Muncie, Indiana
Jan 10, 1987		Eastern Michigan	W 91–64	8–5 (3–1)	Rose Arena; Mount Pleasant, Michigan
Jan 14, 1987		at Miami (OH)	W 82–58	9–5 (4–1)	Millett Hall; Oxford, Ohio
Jan 17, 1987		Toledo	W 76–59	10–5 (5–1)	Rose Arena; Mount Pleasant, Michigan
Jan 21, 1987		at Western Michigan	L 69–73	10–6 (5–2)	University Arena; Kalamazoo, Michigan
Jan 24, 1987*		Chicago State	W 76–66	11–6	Rose Arena; Mount Pleasant, Michigan
Jan 28, 1987		at Ohio	W 70–61	12–6 (6–2)	Convocation Center; Athens, Ohio
Jan 31, 1987		at Bowling Green	W 71–70	13–6 (7–2)	Anderson Arena; Bowling Green, Ohio
Feb 4, 1987		Ball State	W 80–57	14–6 (8–2)	Rose Arena; Mount Pleasant, Michigan
Feb 7, 1987		at Eastern Michigan	W 59–58	15–6 (9–2)	Bowen Field House; Ypsilanti, Michigan
Feb 11, 1987		Miami (OH)	W 83–67	16–6 (10–2)	Rose Arena; Mount Pleasant, Michigan
Feb 14, 1987		at Toledo	W 80–67	17–6 (11–2)	John F. Savage Hall; Toledo, Ohio
Feb 18, 1987		Western Michigan	W 85–71	18–6 (12–2)	Rose Arena; Mount Pleasant, Michigan
Feb 21, 1987*		at Cleveland State	L 101–111	18–7	Woodling Gym; Cleveland, Ohio
Feb 25, 1987		Ohio	W 75–50	19–7 (13–2)	Rose Arena; Mount Pleasant, Michigan
Feb 28, 1987		at Kent State	W 76–68	20–7 (14–2)	Memorial Athletic and Convocation Center; Kent, Ohio
MAC Tournament
Mar 6, 1987*		vs. Eastern Michigan; Semifinals	W 80–76	21–7	John F. Savage Hall; Toledo, Ohio
Mar 7, 1987*		vs. Kent State; Championship game	W 64–63	22–7	John F. Savage Hall; Toledo, Ohio
NCAA Tournament
Mar 12, 1987*	(13 W)	vs. (4 W) No. 15 UCLA; First round	L 73–92	22–8	Jon M. Huntsman Center; Salt Lake City, Utah
*Non-conference game. ^{#}Rankings from AP poll. (#) Tournament seedings in parentheses.
