= 1996–97 Wright State Raiders men's basketball team =

American college basketball season

1996–97 Wright State Raiders men's basketball
- Conference: MCC
- Record: 7–20 (5–11 MCC)
- Head coach: Jim Brown (1st season)
- Assistant coaches: Jim Ehler; Jack Butler
- Home arena: Nutter Center

1996–97 Midwestern Collegiate Conference men's basketball standings
	Conf.				Overall
Team	W		L	PCT	W		L	PCT
Butler †	12	–	4	.750	23	–	10	.697
Detroit Mercy	11	–	5	.688	16	–	13	.552
Illinois-Chicago	11	–	5	.688	15	–	14	.517
Wisconsin–Green Bay	10	–	6	.625	14	–	14	.500
Loyola–Chicago	7	–	9	.438	12	–	15	.444
Northern Illinois	6	–	10	.375	12	–	15	.444
Cleveland State	6	–	10	.375	9	–	19	.321
Wright State	5	–	11	.313	7	–	20	.259
Wisconsin–Milwaukee	4	–	12	.250	8	–	20	.286
† 1997 MCC tournament winner

The 1996–97 Wright State Raiders men's basketball team represented Wright State University in the 1996–97 NCAA Division I men's basketball season led by head coach Jim Brown.

== Offseason ==
Following a first-round tournament loss, the 1996 offseason proved to be difficult for the Raiders program.

=== Coach Underhill vs. President Flack ===
University president Dr. Harley Flack had made his displeasure with head coach Ralph Underhill widely known. This was contemporarily reported to include ultimatums of suspension or firing if the coach received technical fouls, and interference with contract negotiations. Dr. Flack pointedly stopped attending basketball games. His annual briefings to the athletic department called for more diversity, which was understood to be directed at the basketball coaching staff. Coach Underhill later claimed in the press that Flack required athletic director Mike Cusack to interview black basketball players specifically looking for any racial animus.

In coach Underhill’s new contract were specific performance and behavioral expectations. Dr. Flack had made it clear that he expected that the program become a top 50 program and the contract stipulated Wright State should be in the top 150 in RPI within two years. This was an ambitious goal for a fledgling NCAA Division I program in a competitive conference.

=== Division I growing pains ===
The Raiders program at this time was under particular strain because it did not have a full time strength and conditioning coach or a full time academic advisor, or even a full time secretary. The new arena lacked dedicated locker room or workout space specifically for the basketball teams, leading to awkward sharing of equipment and space with other teams, other Nutter Center functions, and the student body. Having grown from a Division II program, few administrative adjustments had been made to accommodate the competitive demands of Division I. The coaching staff tried to pick up the slack.

=== Vitaly Potapenko ===
President Flack made an ultimatum to center Vitaly Potapenko that he would have only one more chance to pass the English as a second language exam or face expulsion. Potapenko had a “B” average and had come very close to passing the exam on his last attempt. Flack had been critical of Potapenko previously, including threatening Potapenko with consequences for perceived academic shortcomings. Potapenko was expected to return for his senior season, but a suspension would have meant missing a year of basketball.

Potapenko entered the NBA draft as an undergraduate and was selected 12th overall by the Cleveland Cavaliers.

=== Players Leaving ===
Guard Rick Martinez had left before the end of the previous season, starting a series of players leaving. Bilaal Neal had left the team with an illness, and junior college swingman Johnnie Blake again promised to join the roster but did not do so for the second year.

Guard Terrance Cast asked out of his scholarship complaining about lack of playing time. Forward Thad Burton also asked for release, but in the end did not leave the school.

=== New Recruits ===
Recruits included junior college forward Mark Oliver, guard Mike Richardson, guard John Sivesind, forward De'Andre Shepard, forward Lequient Lewis, and forward Ryan Grose.

Walk-ons Steve Yeagle, and Anthony Brown rounded out the recruiting class.

=== Coaching Change ===
On November 11, head coach Ralph Underhill attended the MCC preseason media event in Indianapolis. Upon returning home he was arrested for shoplifting at a local grocery store. Four days later he was fired, an event that quickly became a media circus.

Jim Brown was appointed head coach following his tenure as an assistant coach. The Raiders team for that season included several inexperienced players and a schedule that included multiple high-ranking opponents.

== Aftermath ==
Coach Jim Brown and his staff were let go at the end of the season.

Coach Brown had been with the program since it began varsity play in 1970. The University of Dayton grad had become a Raider and was inducted into the Raider’s Hall of Fame in 2009. Brown became the Northmont high school basketball coach in 1997 had a very successful 16 season tenure. Following this he joined the Wright State Raiders radio broadcast team as color commentator.

== Roster ==
1996–97 Wright State Raiders men's basketball team
Players
Coaches

Pos.	#	Name	Height	Weight	Year	Previous school	Hometown
G	20	Rob Welch	6 ft 2 in (1.88 m)	185 lb (84 kg)	RS Sr	Wayne Trace	Haviland, OH
F	40	Mike Conner	6 ft 7 in (2.01 m)	225 lb (102 kg)	Sr	Malden	Boston, MA
G	23	Eric Ramsey	6 ft 1 in (1.85 m)	195 lb (88 kg)	RS Jr	Carroll	Dayton, OH
G	24	Derek Watkins	6 ft 0 in (1.83 m)	180 lb (82 kg)	Jr	Valley View	Germantown, OH
F	33	Mark Oliver	6 ft 5 in (1.96 m)	195 lb (88 kg)	Jr	Central (KS) CC	Orlando, FL
F	43	Thad Burton	6 ft 8 in (2.03 m)	240 lb (109 kg)	Jr	St. Charles Prep	Columbus, OH
F	44	Steno Kos	6 ft 11 in (2.11 m)	220 lb (100 kg)	Jr	St. Catherine JC	Klosterneuburg
G	1	Keion Brooks	6 ft 3 in (1.91 m)	160 lb (73 kg)	So	North Side	Ft. Wayne, IN
F	31	Anthony Brown	6 ft 4 in (1.93 m)	210 lb (95 kg)	So	Beavercreek	Beavercreek, OH
G	22	Mike Richardson	6 ft 0 in (1.83 m)	165 lb (75 kg)	Fr	Scott County High	Georgetown, KY
F	25	Steve Yeagle	6 ft 5 in (1.96 m)	175 lb (79 kg)	Fr	Minford	Minford, OH
G	32	John Sivesind	6 ft 3 in (1.91 m)	195 lb (88 kg)	Fr	Roosevelt	Sioux Falls, SD
F	34	De'Andre Shepard	6 ft 6 in (1.98 m)	215 lb (98 kg)	Fr	Oak Park	Oak Park, MI
F	35	Lequient Lewis	6 ft 6 in (1.98 m)	230 lb (104 kg)	Fr	Pershing	Detroit, MI
F	45	Ryan Grose (redshirt)	6 ft 7 in (2.01 m)	210 lb (95 kg)	Fr	Norwalk	Norwalk, OH

Head coach

- Jim Brown

Assistant coach(es)

Jim Ehler, Jack Butler

Legend

- (C) Team captain
- (S) Suspended
- (I) Ineligible
- (W) Walk-on
- Injured
- Current redshirt

== Schedule and results ==
Date time, TV	Rank^{#}	Opponent^{#}	Result	Record	Site city, state
Nov 30, 1996*		Thomas More	W 97-59	1–0	Nutter Center; Fairborn, OH
Dec 9, 1996*		at No. 6 Kentucky	L 62–90	1–1	Rupp Arena (23,127); Lexington, Kentucky
Dec 11, 1996*		Bowling Green	L 63-90	1-2	Nutter Center; Fairborn, OH
Dec 14, 1996*		Miami (OH)	L 58-89	1–3	Nutter Center; Fairborn, OH
Dec 16, 1996*		at No. 18 Louisville	L 57-65	1–4	Freedom Hall; Louisville, Kentucky
Dec 18, 1996*		at Ohio	L 59-74	1–5	Convocation Center; Athens, Ohio
Dec 21, 1996*		Toledo	L 71-74	1–6	Nutter Center; Fairborn, OH
Dec 28, 1996*		Western Michigan	W 68-58	2–6	Nutter Center; Fairborn, OH
Dec 30, 1996*		at Youngstown State	L 63-69	2-7	Beeghly Center; Youngstown, Ohio
Jan 2, 1997		at Detroit Mercy	L 62–73	2-8 (0–1)	Calihan Hall; Detroit, MI
Jan 4, 1997		at Cleveland State	L 76-79	2-9 (0–2)	CSU Convocation Center; Cleveland, OH
Jan 6, 1997		Wisconsin–Green Bay	W 79-72	3-9 (1–2)	Nutter Center; Fairborn, OH
Jan 9, 1997*		Dayton; Gem City Jam	L 63-72	3-10	Nutter Center; Fairborn, OH
Jan 11, 1997		Northern Illinois	L 55-56	3-11 (1–3)	Nutter Center; Fairborn, OH
Jan 16, 1997		Illinois-Chicago	L 56-64	3-12 (1–4)	Nutter Center; Fairborn, OH
Jan 18, 1997		at Wisconsin–Milwaukee	L 60-61	3-13 (1–5)	MECCA Arena; Milwaukee, WI
Jan 23, 1997		at Loyola–Chicago	L 72-91	3-14 (1–6)	Gentile Event Center; Chicago, IL
Jan 25, 1997		Butler	W 65-62	4–14 (2–6)	Nutter Center (5,367); Fairborn, OH
Jan 30, 1997		Detroit Mercy	L 63–65	4-15 (2–7)	Nutter Center; Fairborn, OH
Feb 1, 1997		Cleveland State	L 71-74	4-16 (2–8)	Nutter Center; Fairborn, OH
Feb 4, 1997		at Illinois-Chicago	L 59-66	4-17 (2–9)	UIC Pavilion; Chicago, IL
Feb 8, 1997		at Northern Illinois	W 77-73	5-17 (3–9)	Chick Evans Field House; DeKalb, IL
Feb 13, 1997		Wisconsin–Milwaukee	W 75-55	6-17 (4–9)	Nutter Center; Fairborn, OH
Feb 20, 1997		at Wisconsin–Green Bay	L 49-69	6-18 (4–10)	Brown County Veterans Memorial Arena; Green Bay, WI
Feb 22, 1997		at Butler	L 57-75	6-19 (4–11)	Hinkle Fieldhouse (7,036); Indianapolis, IN
Feb 24, 1997		Loyola–Chicago	W 56-54	7-19 (5–11)	Nutter Center; Fairborn, OH
Midwestern Collegiate Tournament
Feb 28, 1997	(8)	(9) Wisconsin–Milwaukee; First Round	L 70-81	7-20	Nutter Center; Fairborn, OH
*Non-conference game. ^{#}Rankings from AP Poll. (#) Tournament seedings in parentheses. MW=Midwest.

== Awards and honors ==
Keion Brooks	MVP
Rob Welch	Raider Award
Keion Brooks	First Team MCC

== Statistics ==
Number	Name	Games	Average	Points	Assists	Rebounds
21	Keion Brooks	27	14.6	393	125	127
32	John Sivesind	27	10.3	278	54	85
33	Mark Oliver	25	8.8	221	27	108
20	Rob Welch	25	7.4	184	74	56
22	Mike Richardson	27	6.6	178	43	37
44	Steno Kos	27	5.6	151	10	73
43	Thad Burton	23	5.3	123	11	102
35	Lequient Lewis	23	3.5	92	13	73
40	Mike Conner	13	4.0	52	5	35
25	Steve Yeagle	19	2.1	39	9	24
34	De'Andre Shepard	14	1.5	21	1	26
23	Eric Ramsey	8	1.4	11	3	5
24	Derek Watkins	4	3.5	10	0	0
31	Anthony Brown	12	2.8	10	6	5
