= 1996–97 Miami Redskins men's basketball team =

American college basketball season

1996–97 Miami RedHawks men's basketball

MAC Regular season champion MAC tournament champion

NCAA tournament, First round
- Conference: Mid-American Conference
- Record: 21–9 (13–5 MAC)
- Head coach: Charlie Coles (1st season)
- Home arena: Millett Hall

1996–97 Mid-American Conference men's basketball standings
	Conf.				Overall
Team	W		L	PCT	W		L	PCT
Bowling Green	13	–	5	.722	22	–	10	.688
Miami†	13	–	5	.722	21	–	9	.700
Ohio	12	–	6	.667	17	–	10	.630
Eastern Michigan	11	–	7	.611	22	–	10	.688
Ball State	9	–	9	.500	16	–	13	.552
Western Michigan	9	–	9	.500	14	–	14	.500
Kent State	7	–	11	.389	9	–	18	.333
Toledo	6	–	12	.333	13	–	14	.481
Akron	6	–	12	.333	8	–	18	.308
Central Michigan	4	–	14	.222	7	–	19	.269
† 1997 MAC tournament winner Rankings from AP Poll

The 1996–97 Miami Redskins men's basketball team represent Miami University in the 1996–97 NCAA Division I men's basketball season. The Redskins, led by first year head coach Charlie Coles, played their home games at Millett Hall in Oxford, Ohio as members of the Mid-American Conference. The team finished atop the conference regular season standings, won the MAC tournament, and earned an automatic bid to the NCAA tournament. As the No. 13 seed in the Midwest region, Miami was defeated by Clemson in the opening round. The Redskins finished with a 21–9 record (15–3 MAC).

This was the final season Miami was known as the Redskins. The following season the team would change to the RedHawks.

== Roster ==
1996–97 Miami Redskins men's basketball team
Players
Coaches

Pos.	#	Name	Height	Weight	Year	Hometown
F	4	Ira Newble	6 ft 7 in (2.01 m)	230 lb (104 kg)	Sr	Detroit, Michigan
G	30	Damon Frierson	6 ft 4 in (1.93 m)	—	So
F	32	Wally Szczerbiak	6 ft 7 in (2.01 m)	244 lb (111 kg)	So	Long Island, New York
F	42	Devin Davis	6 ft 7 in (2.01 m)	230 lb (104 kg)	Sr	Miami, Florida

Head coach

- Charlie Coles (Miami (OH))

Assistant coach(es)

- Rob Senderoff (Albany) (GA)

Legend

- (C) Team captain
- (S) Suspended
- (I) Ineligible
- (W) Walk-on
- Injured
- Current redshirt

== Schedule and results ==
Date time, TV	Rank^{#}	Opponent^{#}	Result	Record	Site (attendance) city, state
Regular season
Nov 23, 1996*		at VCU	W 69–66	1–0	Richmond Coliseum; Richmond, Virginia
Nov 30, 1996*		at Xavier	L 71–92	1–1	Cincinnati Gardens; Cincinnati, Ohio
Dec 4, 1996*		Dayton	W 92–72	2–1	Millett Hall; Oxford, Ohio
Dec 6, 1996*		vs. Texas Southern	L 63–67	2–2	Ferrell Center; Waco, Texas
Dec 7, 1996*		vs. Louisiana-Monroe	W 65–49	3–2	Ferrell Center; Waco, Texas
Dec 10, 1996*		Eastern Kentucky	W 91–40	4–2	Millett Hall; Oxford, Ohio
Dec 14, 1996*		at Wright State	W 89–58	5–2	Ervin J. Nutter Center; Fairborn, Ohio
Jan 4, 1997*		Akron	W 84–51	6–2 (1–0)	Millett Hall; Oxford, Ohio
Jan 8, 1997		at Kent State	W 64–57	7–2 (2–0)	Memorial Athletic and Convocation Center; Kent, Ohio
Jan 10, 1997*		at No. 6 Cincinnati	L 61–91	7–3	Fifth Third Arena; Cincinnati, Ohio
Jan 13, 1997		Central Michigan	W 77–51	8–3 (3–0)	Millett Hall; Oxford, Ohio
Jan 15, 1997		at Toledo	W 66–49	9–3 (4–0)	John F. Savage Hall; Toledo, Ohio
Jan 18, 1997		Ohio	W 78–63	10–3 (5–0)	Millett Hall; Oxford, Ohio
Jan 22, 1997		at Bowling Green	L 80–83	10–4 (5–1)	Anderson Arena; Bowling Green, Ohio
Jan 25, 1997		Western Michigan	W 62–49	11–4 (6–1)	Millett Hall; Oxford, Ohio
Jan 27, 1997		at Ball State	L 64–74	11–5 (6–2)	Worthen Arena; Muncie, Indiana
Feb 1, 1997		Kent State	W 73–60	12–5 (7–2)	Millett Hall; Oxford, Ohio
Feb 6, 1997		at Eastern Michigan	L 77–82	12–6 (7–3)	Bowen Field House; Ypsilanti, Michigan
Feb 8, 1997		at Central Michigan	L 75–86	12–7 (7–4)	Rose Arena; Mount Pleasant, Michigan
Feb 12, 1997		Toledo	W 69–52	13–7 (8–4)	Millett Hall; Oxford, Ohio
Feb 15, 1997		at Ohio	L 65–67	13–8 (8–5)	Convocation Center; Athens, Ohio
Feb 19, 1997		Bowling Green	W 64–59	14–8 (9–5)	Millett Hall; Oxford, Ohio
Feb 22, 1997		at Western Michigan	W 56–55	15–8 (10–5)	University Arena; Kalamazoo, Michigan
Feb 24, 1997		Eastern Michigan	W 86–77	16–8 (11–5)	Millett Hall; Oxford, Ohio
Feb 26, 1997		Ball State	W 83–72	17–8 (12–5)	Millett Hall; Oxford, Ohio
Mar 1, 1997		at Akron	W 66–52	18–8 (13–5)	James A. Rhodes Arena; Akron, Ohio
MAC tournament
Mar 4, 1997*		Kent State; Quarterfinals	W 75–65	19–8	Millett Hall; Oxford, Ohio
Mar 7, 1997*		vs. Western Michigan; Semifinals	W 84–67	20–8	SeaGate Convention Centre; Toledo, Ohio
Mar 8, 1997*		vs. Eastern Michigan; Championship game	W 96–76	21–8	SeaGate Convention Centre; Toledo, Ohio
NCAA tournament
Mar 14, 1997*	(13 MW)	vs. (4 MW) No. 14 Clemson; First round	L 56–68	21–9	Kemper Arena; Kansas City, Missouri
*Non-conference game. ^{#}Rankings from AP poll. (#) Tournament seedings in parentheses. MW=Midwest. All times are in Eastern Time.
