= Charlie Coles =

American college basketball coach

Biographical details
- Born: February 6, 1942; Springfield, Ohio, U.S.
- Died: June 7, 2013 (aged 71); Oxford, Ohio, U.S.

Playing career
- 1962–1965: Miami (OH)

Coaching career (HC unless noted)
- 1967–1968: Sycamore HS (assistant)
- 1968–1969: Shawnee HS
- 1969–1972: Yellow Springs HS
- 1972–1982: Saginaw HS
- 1982–1985: Detroit (assistant)
- 1985–1991: Central Michigan
- 1992–1994: Central Catholic HS
- 1994–1996: Miami (OH) (assistant)
- 1996–2012: Miami (OH)

Head coaching record
- Overall: 358–309 (.537) (college)
- Tournaments: 2–4 (NCAA Division I); 0–2 (NIT); 0–2 (CBI)

Accomplishments and honors

Championships
- 3 MAC tournament (1987, 1997, 2007); 4 MAC regular season (1987, 1997, 1999, 2005)

Awards
- 2× MAC Coach of the Year (1987, 2005); No. 10 retired by Miami RedHawks; No. 33 retired by Yellow Springs HS

Charlie Coles (February 6, 1942 – June 7, 2013) was an American college basketball coach and the former men's basketball head coach at Miami University and Central Michigan University.

He was born Charles Leroy Coles in Springfield, Ohio, and later moved in with his grandparents in nearby Yellow Springs, where he attended Bryan High School. He led the state in scoring as a senior, averaging 42.1 points per game, including one game of 65 points, and graduated in 1959. His number 33 was retired by now Yellow Springs High School in a ceremony Coles attended in 2000.

He then went to Miami University in Oxford, Ohio, where he again excelled in basketball from 1962 to 1965. He earned second-team All-MAC Mid-American Conference honors both his junior and senior seasons, averaging double figures in scoring all three seasons, including a career-high 18.5 points per game as a junior. He averaged 15.4 points per game in his Miami career, shooting 45.8 percent from the field and 80.2 percent from the free throw line. He earned a bachelor of arts degree in physical education.

After graduating from Miami, he became a long-time successful high school basketball coach, beginning in Springfield and Yellow Springs before serving as head coach at Saginaw High School in Saginaw, Michigan. He coached the Trojans from 1972 to 1982, leading them to two state championship appearances.

He then moved on to the college ranks, serving as an assistant coach at the University of Detroit from 1982 to 1985.

Coles was the men's basketball head coach at Central Michigan University from 1986 to 1991. He compiled a 92–84 mark in his six seasons with the Chippewas, including 22–8 in 1986–87. Coles was named Mid-American Conference (MAC) Coach of the Year that season after leading CMU to the MAC regular-season and tournament championships and a berth in the NCAA Tournament. That team was led by future NBA All-Star Dan Majerle.

From 1992 to 1994 he served as head coach at Central Catholic High School in Toledo, Ohio, with a record of 32–16 there.

Coles returned to college coaching at Miami as an assistant coach from 1994 to 1996. In 1996, he was named Miami's head coach when Herb Sendek left Miami for North Carolina State University. Coles won three MAC regular-season crowns (1997, 1999 and 2005) while leading the RedHawks to appearances in the championship game of the MAC Tournament his first five years. The RedHawks won the MAC tournament title in 1997 and 2007.

In 1999, Coles and the RedHawks, led by future NBA forward Wally Szczerbiak, reached the NCAA Tournament Sweet 16 before falling to the University of Kentucky.

Coles was named MAC Coach of the Year in 2005. On January 20, 2009, Coles recorded his 217th win at Miami, surpassing Darrell Hedric to become the school's winningest coach. Coles became the all-time MAC wins leader when he picked up his 195th conference victory by beating Ohio University 79–67 on January 16, 2010. Coles finished his career with 219 MAC wins.

While coaching at Miami, he also taught a class in basketball coaching theory. His contributions to Miami, including as player, coach, teacher and mentor, led to his induction into Miami's Athletic Hall of Fame in 1990.

At the conclusion of the 2011–12 season, Coles retired after 16 seasons at Miami.

Coles was married to his wife, Delores and had a son, Chris, and daughter, Mary Bennett. He died June 7, 2013, at the age of 71. The funeral service was held at Miami University's basketball arena, Millett Hall. He was buried in Oxford Cemetery near the Miami campus.

== Head coaching record ==
Record table
| Season | Team | Overall | Conference | Standing | Postseason |
|---|---|---|---|---|---|
Central Michigan Chippewas (Mid-American Conference) (1985–1991)
| 1985–86 | Central Michigan | 11–17 | 7–11 | T–6th | |
| 1986–87 | Central Michigan | 22–8 | 14–2 | 1st | NCAA Division I First Round |
| 1987–88 | Central Michigan | 19–13 | 10–6 | 2nd | |
| 1988–89 | Central Michigan | 13–15 | 7–9 | T–5th | |
| 1989–90 | Central Michigan | 13–17 | 6–10 | 7th | |
| 1990–91 | Central Michigan | 14–14 | 8–8 | 6th | |
| Central Michigan: | | 92–84 (.523) | 52–46 (.531) | | |
Miami Redskins / RedHawks (Mid-American Conference) (1996–2012)
| 1996–97 | Miami | 21–9 | 13–5 | T–1st | NCAA Division I First Round |
| 1997–98 | Miami | 17–12 | 9–9 | T–2nd (East) | |
| 1998–99 | Miami | 24–8 | 15–3 | 1st (East) | NCAA Division I Sweet 16 |
| 1999–00 | Miami | 15–15 | 8–10 | 6th (East) | |
| 2000–01 | Miami | 17–16 | 10–8 | T–4th (East) | |
| 2001–02 | Miami | 13–18 | 9–9 | 4th (East) | |
| 2002–03 | Miami | 13–15 | 11–7 | 2nd (East) | |
| 2003–04 | Miami | 18–11 | 12–6 | 2nd (East) | |
| 2004–05 | Miami | 19–11 | 12–6 | 1st (East) | NIT First Round |
| 2005–06 | Miami | 18–11 | 14–4 | T–2nd (East) | NIT Opening Round |
| 2006–07 | Miami | 18–15 | 10–6 | 3rd (East) | NCAA Division I First Round |
| 2007–08 | Miami | 17–15 | 9–7 | 4th (East) | CBI First Round |
| 2008–09 | Miami | 17–13 | 10–6 | T–3rd (East) | |
| 2009–10 | Miami | 14–18 | 9–7 | T–3rd (East) | |
| 2010–11 | Miami | 16–17 | 11–5 | 2nd (East) | CBI First Round |
| 2011–12 | Miami | 9–21 | 5–11 | 6th (East) | |
| Miami: | | 266–225 (.542) | 167–109 (.605) | | |
| Total: | | 358–309 (.537) | | | |
National champion Postseason invitational champion Conference regular season champion Conference regular season and conference tournament champion Division regular season champion Division regular season and conference tournament champion Conference tournament champion
