= 1996–97 Ohio Bobcats men's basketball team =

American college basketball season

1996–97 Ohio Bobcats men's basketball
- Conference: Mid-American Conference
- Record: 17–10 (12–6 MAC)
- Head coach: Larry Hunter (8th season)
- Assistant coaches: Mike Elfers; Reggie Rankin; Kevin Eckert
- Home arena: Convocation Center

1996–97 Mid-American Conference men's basketball standings
	Conf.				Overall
Team	W		L	PCT	W		L	PCT
Bowling Green	13	–	5	.722	22	–	10	.688
Miami†	13	–	5	.722	21	–	9	.700
Ohio	12	–	6	.667	17	–	10	.630
Eastern Michigan	11	–	7	.611	22	–	10	.688
Ball State	9	–	9	.500	16	–	13	.552
Western Michigan	9	–	9	.500	14	–	14	.500
Kent State	7	–	11	.389	9	–	18	.333
Toledo	6	–	12	.333	13	–	14	.481
Akron	6	–	12	.333	8	–	18	.308
Central Michigan	4	–	14	.222	7	–	19	.269
† 1997 MAC tournament winner Rankings from AP Poll

The 1996–97 Ohio Bobcats men's basketball team represented Ohio University in the college basketball season of 1996–97. The team was coached by Larry Hunter and played their home games at the Convocation Center. They finished the season 17–10 and finished third in the MAC regular season with a conference record of 12–6.

== Roster ==
1996–97 Ohio Bobcats men's basketball team
Players
Coaches

Pos.	#	Name	Height	Weight	Year	Hometown
G	12	Geno Ford	5 ft 8 in (1.73 m)	160 lb (73 kg)	Sr	Cambridge, OH
C	50	Ed Sears	6 ft 9 in (2.06 m)	280 lb (127 kg)	Sr	Brooklyn, N.Y
F	44	Curtis Simmons	6 ft 5 in (1.96 m)	216 lb (98 kg)	Sr	Columbus, OH
F	35	Damion Washington	6 ft 4 in (1.93 m)	180 lb (82 kg)	So	Toledo, OH
F	32	Diante Flenorl	6 ft 9 in (2.06 m)	215 lb (98 kg)	Fr	Milwaukee, WI
F	33	Basra Fakhir	6 ft 5 in (1.96 m)	240 lb (109 kg)	Fr	East Cleveland, OH
G	21	Jason Grunkemeyer	6 ft 6 in (1.98 m)	190 lb (86 kg)	Fr	Cincinnati, OH
G	10	Corey Reed	5 ft 10 in (1.78 m)	175 lb (79 kg)	So	Milwaukee, WI
G	22	Jim Peterson	6 ft 5 in (1.96 m)	215 lb (98 kg)	Fr	Beaver Falls, PA
F	45	Paul Morris	6 ft 7 in (2.01 m)	240 lb (109 kg)	Sr	Rapid City, SD
F	24	Matt Jager	6 ft 7 in (2.01 m)	220 lb (100 kg)	Fr	Vista, CA
C	41	Andy Kanzig	6 ft 10 in (2.08 m)	280 lb (127 kg)	So	Perrysville, OH
SG	00	Jonathan Berkley	6 ft 1 in (1.85 m)	220 lb (100 kg)	So	Louisville, KY

Head coach

- Larry Hunter

Assistant coach(es)

- Mike Elfers
- Reggie Rankin
- Kevin Eckert

Legend

- (C) Team captain
- (S) Suspended
- (I) Ineligible
- (W) Walk-on
- Injured
- Current redshirt

Roster
Last update: July 4, 2014

== Schedule ==
Date time, TV	Rank^{#}	Opponent^{#}	Result	Record	Site (attendance) city, state
Non-conference regular season
11/27/1996*		Wilmington	W 62–48	1–0	Convocation Center; Athens, Ohio
11/30/1996*		at West Virginia	L 68–83	1–1	
12/7/1996*		at Illinois State	L 69–81	1–2	Redbird Arena (8,153); Normal, Illinois
12/12/1996*		at Cal State Northridge	W 80–73	2–2	
12/14/1996*		at No. 23 UCLA	L 61–72	2–3	Pauley Pavilion (8,053); Los Angeles, California
12/18/1996*		Wright State	W 74–59	3–3	Convocation Center; Athens, Ohio
12/21/1996*		Radford	W 83–65	4–3	Convocation Center; Athens, Ohio
12/28/1996*		Duquesne	W 85–67	5–3	Convocation Center; Athens, Ohio
MAC regular season
1/4/1997		Western Michigan	L 63–64	5–4 (0–1)	Convocation Center; Athens, Ohio
1/9/1997		at Ball State	L 76–86	5–5 (0–2)	Worthen Arena; Muncie, Indiana
1/11/1997		at Akron	W 67–64	6–5 (1–2)	
1/13/1997		at Kent State	W 72–60	7–5 (2–2)	Memorial Athletic and Convocation Center; Kent, Ohio
1/18/1997		at Miami (OH)	L 63–78	7–6 (2–3)	Millett Hall; Oxford, Ohio
1/22/1997		Toledo	W 82–78	8–6 (3–3)	Convocation Center; Athens, Ohio
1/25/1997		Central Michigan	W 83–68	9-6 (4–3)	Convocation Center; Athens, Ohio
1/29/1997		at Bowling Green	L 59–72	9-7 (4–4)	Anderson Arena; Bowling Green, Ohio
2/1/1997		Ball State	W 79–58	10–7 (5–4)	Convocation Center; Athens, Ohio
2/3/1997		Eastern Michigan	W 71–70	11–7 (6–4)	Convocation Center; Athens, Ohio
2/5/1997		at Akron	W 71–67	12–7 (7–4)	
2/8/1997		Kent State	W 79–59	13–7 (8–4)	Convocation Center; Athens, Ohio
2/12/1997		at Eastern Michigan	W 71–62	14–7 (9–4)	Bowen Field House; Ypsilanti, Michigan
2/15/1997		Miami (OH)	W 67–65	15–7 (10–4)	Convocation Center; Athens, Ohio
2/17/1997		at Toledo	L 69–80	15–8 (10–5)	John F. Savage Hall; Toledo, Ohio
2/22/1997		at Central Michigan	W 100–82	16–8 (11–5)	Rose Arena; Mount Pleasant, Michigan
2/26/1997		Bowling Green	W 89–87 ^{OT}	17–8 (12–5)	Convocation Center; Athens, Ohio
3/1/1997		at Western Michigan	L 73–82	17–9 (12–6)	University Arena; Kalamazoo, Michigan
MAC tournament
3/4/1997	(3)	vs. (6) Western Michigan; Quarterfinals	L 68–74	17–10 (12–7)	SeaGate Convention Centre; Toledo, Ohio
*Non-conference game. ^{#}Rankings from AP Poll. (#) Tournament seedings in parentheses. All times are in Eastern Time.

== Statistics ==
=== Team statistics ===
Final 1996–97 statistics

Record	Ohio	OPP
Scoring	1984	1904
Scoring Average	73.48	70.52
Field goals – Att	742–1550	666–1481
3-pt. Field goals – Att	117–307	145–412
Free throws – Att	383–588	427–597
Rebounds	1015	836
Assists	364	368
Turnovers	440	403
Steals	204	204
Blocked Shots	73	68

=== Player statistics ===
			Minutes		Scoring		Total FGs			3-point FGs			Free-Throws			Rebounds								
Player	GP	GS	Tot	Avg	Pts	Avg	FG	FGA	Pct	3FG	3FA	Pct	FT	FTA	Pct	Off	Def	Tot	Avg	A	PF	TO	Stl	Blk
Geno Ford	27	27	1015	37.6	505	18.7	167	404	0.413	59	151	0.391	112	131	0.855	0	0	98	3.6	78	76	68	46	4
Ed Sears	27	27	706	26.1	403	14.9	156	241	0.647	0	0	0	91	133	0.684	0	0	176	6.5	24	88	0	12	16
Curtis Simmons	24	10	673	28	388	16.2	158	268	0.59	1	4	0.25	71	122	0.582	0	0	139	5.8	56	63	0	40	25
Damion Washington	27	7	573	21.2	156	5.8	57	135	0.422	19	57	0.333	23	35	0.657	0	0	94	3.5	33	46	45	21	1
Diante Flenorl	25	18	534	21.4	143	5.7	60	148	0.405	1	4	0.25	22	36	0.611	0	0	98	3.9	32	51	30	15	12
Basra Fakhir	27	19	555	20.6	123	4.6	55	114	0.482	0	0	0	13	27	0.481	0	0	146	5.4	28	58	31	8	3
Jason Grunkemeyer	26	6	428	16.5	115	4.4	36	85	0.424	27	57	0.474	16	25	0.64	0	0	41	1.6	14	44	24	9	2
Corey Reed	26	18	621	23.9	97	3.7	33	86	0.384	0	1	0	31	72	0.431	0	0	70	2.7	84	52	60	43	9
Jim Peterson	19	0	103	5.4	36	1.9	12	42	0.286	10	33	0.303	2	4	0.5	0	0	10	0.5	1	19	8	2	0
Paul Morris	9	3	183	20.3	18	2	8	20	0.4	0	0	0	2	3	0.667	0	0	34	3.8	14	23	19	8	1
Jason Bundy	1	0	2	2	0	0	0	1	0	0	0	0	0	0	0	0	0	0	0	0	0	0	0	0
Matt Jager	3	0	21	7	0	0	0	2	0	0	0	0	0	0	0	0	0	1	0.3	0	3	0	0	0
Andy Kanzig	2	0	10	5	0	0	0	4	0	0	0	0	0	0	0	0	0	2	1	0	1	2	0	0
Total	27	-	0	-	1984	73.5	742	1550	0.479	117	307	0.381	383	588	0.651	390	625	1015	37.6	364	524	440	204	73
Opponents	27	-	-	-	1904	70.5	666	1481	0.450	145	412	0.352	427	597	0.715	294	542	836	31.0	368	545	403	204	68

Legend
GP	Games played	GS	Games started	Avg	Average per game
FG	Field-goals made	FGA	Field-goal attempts	Off	Offensive rebounds
Def	Defensive rebounds	A	Assists	TO	Turnovers
Blk	Blocks	Stl	Steals	High	Team high
