= 1987 MAC men's basketball tournament =

- Classification: Division I
- Season: 1986–87
- Teams: 7
- First round site: Campus Arenas; Campus Sites
- Finals site: Centennial Hall; Toledo, OH
- Champions: Central Michigan (1st title)
- Winning coach: Charlie Coles (1st title)
- MVP: Dan Majerle (Central Michigan)
- MAC men's basketball tournaments

1986–87 Mid-American Conference men's basketball standings
	Conf.				Overall
Team	W		L	PCT	W		L	PCT
Central Michigan†	14	–	2	.875	22	–	8	.733
Kent State	11	–	5	.688	19	–	10	.655
Bowling Green	10	–	6	.625	15	–	14	.517
Eastern Michigan	8	–	8	.500	14	–	15	.483
Miami	7	–	9	.438	14	–	14	.500
Ohio	7	–	9	.438	14	–	14	.500
Western Michigan	7	–	9	.438	12	–	16	.429
Toledo	4	–	12	.250	11	–	17	.393
Ball State	4	–	12	.250	9	–	18	.333
† Mid-American Conference tournament winner Rankings from AP Poll

The 1987 MAC men's basketball tournament was held March 5–7 at Centennial Hall in Toledo, Ohio. Top-seeded Central Michigan defeated Kent State in the championship game by the score of 64–63 to win their first MAC men's basketball tournament and a bid to the NCAA tournament. There they lost to UCLA in the first round. Dan Majerle of Central Michigan was named the tournament MVP.

== Format ==
Seven of the nine MAC teams participated. All games were played at Centennial Hall in Toledo, Ohio.

== Bracket ==
Quarterfinals; March 5
5	Miami (OH)	64
4	Eastern Michigan	87
3	Bowling Green	52
6	Ohio	51
7	Western Michigan	75
2	Kent State	84

Semifinals; March 6
1	Central Michigan	80
4	Eastern Michigan	76
3	Bowling Green	59
2	Kent State	66

Final; March 7
1	Central Michigan	64
2	Kent State	63
