= Barry Collier (basketball) =

American basketball player and coach, college athletics administrator

Biographical details
- Born: July 15, 1954 (age 72)
- Education: Miami Dade CC, A.A., 1974; Butler, B.S., 1976; Indiana State, M.S., 1977

Playing career
- 1972–1974: Miami Dade CC
- 1974–1976: Butler

Coaching career (HC unless noted)
- 1976–1977: Rose-Hulman (assistant)
- 1977–1978: Seattle Central CC (assistant)
- 1978–1983: Idaho (assistant)
- 1983–1986: Oregon (assistant)
- 1986–1989: Stanford (assistant)
- 1989–2000: Butler
- 2000–2006: Nebraska

Administrative career (AD unless noted)
- 2006–2024: Butler

Head coaching record
- Overall: 285–223
- Tournaments: 0–3 (NCAA Division I); 4–5 (NIT)

Accomplishments and honors

Championships
- 2 MCC regular season (1997, 2000); 3 MCC tournament (1997, 1998, 2000)

Awards
- 4× MCC Coach of the Year (1991, 1997, 1999, 2000)

Barry Scott Collier (born July 15, 1954) is an American former athletics administrator and college basketball coach. Collier served as the head men's basketball coach at Butler University from 1989 to 2000 and the University of Nebraska–Lincoln from 2000 to 2006, compiling a career head coaching record of 285–223 (.561). He was the athletic director at Butler from 2006 to 2024.

== Playing career ==
Collier attended Miami Palmetto High School in Pinecrest, Florida, and later received an Associate of Arts degree from Miami Dade Community College in 1974. He transferred to Butler and played basketball under George Theofanis for two seasons, and was named a team captain and co-MVP in 1975–76. As a senior, he averaged 15.2 points and a team-high 7.5 rebounds while earning first team all-conference recognition in the Indiana Collegiate Conference. He earned a Bachelor of Science degree from Butler in 1976 and a Master of Science degree from Indiana State University in 1977.

== Assistant coach ==
Collier began his coaching career in 1976 at Rose-Hulman Institute of Technology in Terre Haute, Indiana, and then went to the Pacific Northwest, at Seattle Central Community College for a season. He joined the staff of first-year head coach Don Monson at the University of Idaho in 1978, and they transformed a cellar program in the Big Sky Conference into a top ten team in 1982; the 26–2 Vandals were a #3 seed in the West region and advanced to the Sweet Sixteen, falling to the second seed, fourth-ranked Oregon State.

Following the 1983 season and a hundred wins in Moscow, Collier went with Monson to the University of Oregon in the Pac-10. After three years in Eugene, Collier joined the staff of new head coach Mike Montgomery at Stanford University; Montgomery was previously the head coach for eight seasons at Montana in the Big Sky.

== Head coach ==
After #13 Stanford reached the NCAA tournament in 1989, Collier began actively searching for a head coaching position. When he learned his alma mater had an opening, "he submitted a 45-page proposal on how to revive the Butler program to then university president Geoffrey Bannister. The 34-year-old Collier was put in charge of team that hadn't made the NCAA tournament in nearly thirty years."

Collier took his first head coaching job at Butler in 1989, a position he held until 2000. During those eleven seasons at Butler, the team had six postseason appearances, including an NCAA Tournament appearance, Butler's first in 35 years. The Bulldogs had five 20-win seasons, after just two in the prior 91-year history of the program, and was named Midwestern Collegiate Conference (now Horizon League) coach of the year in 1991, 1997, 1999, and 2000.

In April 2000, Collier became the head coach at the University of Nebraska in the Big 12 Conference. After six seasons, he moved back to Butler to take the position of vice president and director of athletics, two days after entering the school's Athletic Hall of Fame.

== Head coaching record ==
Record table
Season	Team	Overall	Conference	Standing	Postseason
Butler Bulldogs (Midwestern Collegiate Conference) (1989–2000)
1989–90	Butler	6–22	2–12	8th	
1990–91	Butler	18–11	10–4	2nd	NIT First Round
1991–92	Butler	21–10	7–3	T–2nd	NIT First Round
1992–93	Butler	11–17	6–8	T–5th	
1993–94	Butler	16–13	6–4	T–2nd	
1994–95	Butler	15–12	8–7	5th	
1995–96	Butler	19–8	11–5	2nd	
1996–97	Butler	23–10	12–4	1st	NCAA Division I First Round
1997–98	Butler	22–11	8–6	3rd	NCAA Division I First Round
1998–99	Butler	22–10	11–3	2nd	NIT Quarterfinal
1999–00	Butler	23–8	12–2	1st	NCAA Division I First Round
Butler:		196–132 (.598)	93–58 (.616)		
Nebraska Cornhuskers (Big 12 Conference) (2000–2006)
2000–01	Nebraska	14–16	7–9	7th	
2001–02	Nebraska	13–15	6–10	T–7th	
2002–03	Nebraska	11–19	3–13	12th	
2003–04	Nebraska	18–13	6–10	9th	NIT Second Round
2004–05	Nebraska	14–14	7–9	T–8th	
2005–06	Nebraska	19–14	7–9	6th	NIT First Round
Nebraska:		89–91 (.494)	36–60 (.375)		
Total:		285–223 (.561)			
National champion Postseason invitational champion Conference regular season champion Conference regular season and conference tournament champion Division regular season champion Division regular season and conference tournament champion Conference tournament champion
