= 1999–2000 Butler Bulldogs men's basketball team =

American college basketball season

1999–2000 Butler Bulldogs men's basketball
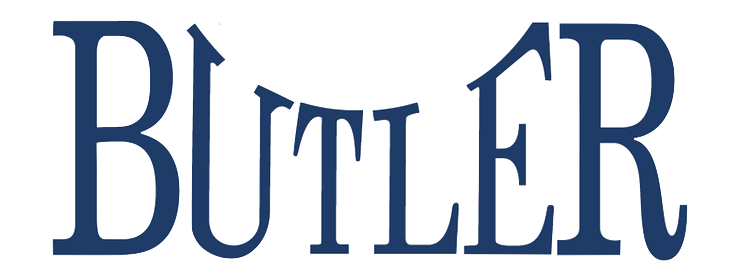

MCC tournament champions MCC regular season champions

NCAA tournament
- Conference: Midwestern Collegiate Conference
- Record: 23–8 (12–2 MCC)
- Head coach: Barry Collier (11th season)
- Assistant coaches: Thad Matta; Todd Lickliter; Mark Bailey

1999–2000 Midwestern Collegiate Conference men's basketball standings
	Conf.				Overall
Team	W		L	PCT	W		L	PCT
Butler †	12	–	2	.857	23	–	8	.742
Cleveland State	9	–	5	.643	16	–	14	.533
Detroit	8	–	6	.571	20	–	12	.625
Green Bay	6	–	8	.429	14	–	16	.467
Milwaukee	6	–	8	.429	15	–	14	.517
Wright State	6	–	8	.429	11	–	17	.393
UIC	5	–	9	.357	11	–	20	.355
Loyola Chicago	4	–	10	.286	14	–	14	.500
† 2000 MCC tournament winner

The 1999–2000 Butler Bulldogs men's basketball team represented Butler University in the 1999–2000 NCAA Division I men's basketball season. Their head coach was Barry Collier, serving in his 11th and final season at the school. The Bulldogs played their home games at Hinkle Fieldhouse as members of the Midwestern Collegiate Conference. Butler finished first in the MCC regular season standings by three games and won the MCC tournament to receive the conference's automatic bid to the NCAA tournament – the school's third NCAA Tournament appearance in four years. As No. 12 seed in the East region, and entering play with a 15-game win streak, the Bulldogs were beaten at the buzzer by No. 5 seed Florida, 69–68 in OT, in a game the Gators used as a springboard to an eventual National runner-up finish. Butler finished the season with a record of 23–8 (12–2 MCC).

== Roster ==
1999–2000 Butler Bulldogs men's basketball team
Players
Coaches

Pos.	#	Name	Height	Weight	Year	Hometown
G	11	Andrew Graves	6 ft 3 in (1.91 m)	—	Sr
F	22	Mike Marshall	6 ft 4 in (1.93 m)	—	Sr
G	25	LaVall Jordan	6 ft 2 in (1.88 m)	—	Jr	Albion, MI
C	40	Scott Robisch	6 ft 11 in (2.11 m)	—	Jr	Springfield, IL
G		Jason Myers	6 ft 2 in (1.88 m)	—	Jr
G	4	Michael Hicks	6 ft 3 in (1.91 m)	—	Jr
G	5	Thomas Jackson	5 ft 9 in (1.75 m)	165 lb (75 kg)	So	East Lansing, MI
F	42	Rylan Hainje	6 ft 6 in (1.98 m)	—	So	Indianapolis, IN
G		Brandon Miller (redshirt)	6 ft 0 in (1.83 m)	—	So	New Castle, IN
G	10	Darnell Archey	6 ft 1 in (1.85 m)	160 lb (73 kg)	Fr	New Castle, IN
F	33	Joel Cornette	6 ft 10 in (2.08 m)	230 lb (104 kg)	Fr	Cincinnati, OH
F	51	Lewis Curry	6 ft 7 in (2.01 m)	230 lb (104 kg)	Fr	Fort Wayne, IN
C	55	Mike Moore	6 ft 10 in (2.08 m)	220 lb (100 kg)	Fr	Fairborn, OH

Head coach

- Barry Collier (Butler)

Assistant coach(es)

- Thad Matta (Butler)
- Todd Lickliter (Butler)
- Mark Bailey (Wisconsin-Parkside)

Legend

- (C) Team captain
- (S) Suspended
- (I) Ineligible
- (W) Walk-on
- Injured
- Current redshirt

Roster

== Schedule and results ==
Date time, TV	Rank^{#}	Opponent^{#}	Result	Record	Site city, state
Regular season
Nov 23, 1999*		at UNC Wilmington	L 54–56	0–1	Trask Coliseum (4,423); Wilmington, North Carolina
Nov 28, 1999*		Mount St. Mary's	W 82–55	1–1	Hinkle Fieldhouse (3,112); Indianapolis, Indiana
Dec 1, 1999*		Indiana State	W 77–55	2–1	Hinkle Fieldhouse (4,367); Indianapolis, Indiana
Dec 4, 1999*		Evansville	W 73–45	3–1	Hinkle Fieldhouse (5,724); Indianapolis, Indiana
Dec 7, 1999*		at Eastern Illinois	L 60–69 ^{OT}	3–2	Lantz Arena (2,682); Charleston, Illinois
Dec 11, 1999*		at Ball State	L 70–80	3–3	Worthen Arena (5,936); Muncie, Indiana
Dec 18, 1999*		Belmont	W 79–35	4–3	Hinkle Fieldhouse (3,503); Indianapolis, Indiana
Dec 22, 1999*		Nevada	W 66–45	5–3	Hinkle Fieldhouse (3,815); Indianapolis, Indiana
Dec 27, 1999*		at TCU	W 86–78	6–3	Daniel-Meyer Coliseum (4,027); Fort Worth, Texas
Dec 29, 1999*		vs. La Salle	W 43–36	7–3	Leavey Center (2,588); Santa Clara, California
Dec 30, 1999*		at Santa Clara	L 56–57	7–4	Leavey Center (2,970); Santa Clara, California
Jan 3, 2000*		at UT Martin	L 62–64	7–5	Skyhawk Arena (1,267); Martin, Tennessee
Jan 8, 2000		Wright State	W 71–47	8–5 (1–0)	Hinkle Fieldhouse (5,727); Indianapolis, Indiana
Jan 13, 2000		at Cleveland State	L 45–53	8–6 (1–1)	CSU Convocation Center (2,789); Cleveland, Ohio
Jan 15, 2000		at Detroit	L 65–75	8–7 (1–2)	Calihan Hall (2,880); Detroit, Michigan
Jan 20, 2000		Green Bay	W 60–44	9–7 (2–2)	Hinkle Fieldhouse (3,385); Indianapolis, Indiana
Jan 22, 2000		Milwaukee	W 72–64	10–7 (3–2)	Hinkle Fieldhouse (4,058); Indianapolis, Indiana
Jan 24, 2000*		IUPUI	W 70–59	11–7	Hinkle Fieldhouse (3,845); Indianapolis, Indiana
Jan 27, 2000		at UIC	W 75–46	12–7 (4–2)	UIC Pavilion (2,232); Chicago, Illinois
Jan 29, 2000		at Loyola Chicago	W 68–48	13–7 (5–2)	Joseph J. Gentile Center (3,142); Chicago, Illinois
Feb 5, 2000		at Wright State	W 79–55	14–7 (6–2)	Ervin J. Nutter Center (6,580); Fairborn, Ohio
Feb 10, 2000		Detroit	W 68–62	15–7 (7–2)	Hinkle Fieldhouse (4,453); Indianapolis, Indiana
Feb 12, 2000		Cleveland State	W 81–54	16–7 (8–2)	Hinkle Fieldhouse (6,611); Indianapolis, Indiana
Feb 17, 2000		at Milwaukee	W 84–72	17–7 (9–2)	Klotsche Center (2,448); Milwaukee, Wisconsin
Feb 19, 2000		at Green Bay	W 62–50	18–7 (10–2)	Brown County Arena (4,549); Green Bay, Wisconsin
Feb 24, 2000		Loyola Chicago	W 59–44	19–7 (11–2)	Hinkle Fieldhouse (4,755); Indianapolis, Indiana
Feb 26, 2000		UIC	W 84–60	20–7 (12–2)	Hinkle Fieldhouse (6,561); Indianapolis, Indiana
MCC tournament
Mar 4, 2000*		vs. Loyola Chicago; Quarterfinals	W 61–57	21–7	UIC Pavilion (3,522); Chicago, Illinois
Mar 5, 2000*		vs. UW–Milwaukee; Semifinals	W 65–51	22–7	UIC Pavilion (4,172); Chicago, Illinois
Mar 6, 2000*		vs. Detroit; Championship game	W 62–43	23–7	UIC Pavilion (3,062); Chicago, Illinois
NCAA tournament
Mar 17, 2000*	(12 E)	vs. (5 E) No. 13 Florida; First Round	L 68–69 ^{OT}	23–8	Lawrence Joel Coliseum (14,252); Winston-Salem, North Carolina
*Non-conference game. ^{#}Rankings from AP poll. (#) Tournament seedings in parentheses. E=East. All times are in Eastern Time.
