= 1997 Midwestern Collegiate Conference men's basketball tournament =

- Classification: Division I
- Season: 1996–97
- Teams: 9
- Site: Nutter Center; Dayton, OH
- Champions: Butler
- Winning coach: Barry Collier
- MVP: Kelsey Wilson, Butler (Butler)

1996–97 Midwestern Collegiate Conference men's basketball standings
	Conf.				Overall
Team	W		L	PCT	W		L	PCT
Butler †	12	–	4	.750	23	–	10	.697
Detroit Mercy	11	–	5	.688	16	–	13	.552
Illinois-Chicago	11	–	5	.688	15	–	14	.517
Wisconsin–Green Bay	10	–	6	.625	14	–	14	.500
Loyola–Chicago	7	–	9	.438	12	–	15	.444
Northern Illinois	6	–	10	.375	12	–	15	.444
Cleveland State	6	–	10	.375	9	–	19	.321
Wright State	5	–	11	.313	7	–	20	.259
Wisconsin–Milwaukee	4	–	12	.250	8	–	20	.286
† 1997 MCC tournament winner

The 1997 Midwestern Collegiate Conference men's basketball tournament took place at the end of the 1996–97 regular season. The tournament was hosted by Wright State.

== Seeds ==
All Midwestern Collegiate Conference schools played in the tournament. Teams were seeded by 1996–97 Midwestern Collegiate Conference season record, with a tiebreaker system to seed teams with identical conference records.

== Bracket ==
First round
9	WI-Milwaukee	81
8	Wright State	78

Second round
1	Butler	48
9	WI-Milwaukee	36
4	WI-Green Bay	51
5	Loyola (IL)	41
2	Detroit	63
7	Cleveland State	67
3	Illinois-Chicago	76
6	Northern Illinois	65

Semifinals
1	Butler	57
4	WI-Green Bay	52
7	Cleveland State	42
3	Illinois-Chicago	64

Championship
1	Butler	69
3	Illinois-Chicago	68
