= Olivet Comets men's basketball =

- University: Olivet College
- First season: 1899; 127 years ago
- Head coach: Sam Hargraves (3rd season)
- Arena: Cutler Event Center (capacity: 1,300)
- Conference: Michigan Intercollegiate Athletic Association
- Nickname: Comets
- Colors: Red and white
- Student section: OC Nation
- All-time record: 815–1,388–1 (.370)

NCAA Division I tournament champions
- None

NCAA Division I tournament appearances
- None

Conference tournament champions
- None

Conference regular-season champions
- 1913, 1932, 1971, 1972, 1973, 2018

The Olivet Comets men's basketball program represents Olivet College in men's basketball at the NCAA Division III level.

== List of coaches ==
- Unknown (1898–1901)
- No team (1901–1905)
- Burt Kennedy (1905–1907)
- No team (1907–1908)
- Brainerd (1908–1909)
- Henry Hall (1909–1911)
- No team (1911–1912)
- Henry Hall (1912–1913)
- Lancaster (1913–1914)
- George Rider (1914–1915)
- No team (1915–1916)
- Unknown (1916–1919)
- No team (1919–1920)
- Ernest Watson (1920–1922)
- No team (1922–1923)
- George Johnson (1923–1924)
- Joe Shafer (1924–1926)
- Alvin Cassell (1926–1928)
- Walter Sprandel (1928–1942)
- No team (1942–1946)
- Frank Ham (1946–1952)
- Vaughn Snook (1952–1953)
- Warren Thomas (1953–1956)
- Della Guistina (1956–1957)
- Henry Paul (1957–1960)
- Eugene Anderson (1960–1964)
- Vincent Sigren (1964–1965)
- Eugene Anderson (1965–1967)
- Gary Morrison (1967–1997)
- Steve Hettinga (1997–2004)
- Kurt Soderberg (2004–2007)
- Gene Gifford (2007–2012)
- Chris Coles (2012–2016)
- Steve Ernst (2016–2019)
- Sam Hargraves (2019–present)
