= 1986–87 Ohio Bobcats men's basketball team =

American college basketball season

1986–87 Ohio Bobcats men's basketball
- Conference: Mid-American Conference
- Record: 14–14 (7–9 MAC)
- Head coach: Billy Hahn (1st season)
- Home arena: Convocation Center

1986–87 Mid-American Conference men's basketball standings
	Conf.				Overall
Team	W		L	PCT	W		L	PCT
Central Michigan†	14	–	2	.875	22	–	8	.733
Kent State	11	–	5	.688	19	–	10	.655
Bowling Green	10	–	6	.625	15	–	14	.517
Eastern Michigan	8	–	8	.500	14	–	15	.483
Miami	7	–	9	.438	14	–	14	.500
Ohio	7	–	9	.438	14	–	14	.500
Western Michigan	7	–	9	.438	12	–	16	.429
Toledo	4	–	12	.250	11	–	17	.393
Ball State	4	–	12	.250	9	–	18	.333
† Mid-American Conference tournament winner Rankings from AP Poll

The 1986–87 Ohio Bobcats men's basketball team represented Ohio University as a member of the Mid-American Conference in the college basketball season of 1986–87. The team was coached by Billy Hahn in his first season at Ohio. They played their home games at Convocation Center. The Bobcats finished with a record of 14–14 and finished sixth in MAC regular season with a conference record of 7–9.

== Schedule ==
Date time, TV	Rank^{#}	Opponent^{#}	Result	Record	Site (attendance) city, state
Non-conference regular season
11/29/1986*		Tri-State	W 97–74	1–0	
12/1/1986*		Akron	W 81–79	2–0	
12/3/1986*		at Robert Morris	L 56–58	2–1	
12/6/1986*		at Ohio State	L 75–96	2–2	
12/8/1986*		Hofstra	W 84–70	3–2	
12/10/1986*		at Marshall	L 68–78	3–3	Cam Henderson Center; Huntington, WV
12/13/1986		at Bowling Green	L 63–75	3–4 (0–1)	
12/17/1986*		Youngstown State	W 82–63	4–4	
12/19/1986*		at No. 1 UNLV; Rebel Round-Up	L 81–105	4–5	Thomas & Mack Center; Las Vegas, NV
12/20/1986*		vs. Duquesne; Rebel Round-Up	W 87–85	5–5	Thomas & Mack Center; Las Vegas, NV
12/29/1986*		Wagner	W 77–72	6–5	
MAC regular season
1/3/1987		Eastern Michigan	W 60–59	7–5 (1–1)	
1/7/1987		at Toledo	W 75–72	8–5 (2–1)	
1/14/1987		at Kent State	W 80–78	9–5 (3–1)	
1/17/1987		Ball State	L 82–86	9-6 (3–2)	
1/21/1987		at Miami (OH)	L 67–77	9-7 (3–3)	
1/24/1987		Western Michigan	L 80–87	9–8 (3–4)	
1/28/1987		Central Michigan	L 61–70	9–9 (3–5)	
1/31/1987		at Eastern Michigan	L 67–81	9–10 (3–6)	
2/4/1987		Toledo	W 72–70 ^{OT}	10–10 (4–6)	
2/7/1987*		Anderson	W 74–67	11–10	
2/11/1987		Kent State	L 62–63	11–11 (4–7)	
2/14/1987		at Ball State	W 52–49	12–11 (5–7)	
2/18/1987		Miami (OH)	W 60–47	13–11 (6–7)	
2/21/1987		at Western Michigan	W 70–57	14–11 (7–7)	
2/25/1987		at Central Michigan	L 50–75	14–12 (7–8)	
2/28/1987		Bowling Green	L 53–56	14–13 (7–9)	
MAC tournament
3/5/1987		vs. Bowling Green; Quarterfinal	L 51–52	14–14 (7–10)	
*Non-conference game. ^{#}Rankings from AP Poll. (#) Tournament seedings in parentheses. All times are in Eastern Time.

== Statistics ==
=== Team statistics ===
Final 1986–87 statistics

Record	Ohio	OPP
Scoring	1967	2001
Scoring Average	70.25	71.46
Field goals – Att	771–1662	762–1634
3-pt. Field goals – Att	53–183	82–226
Free throws – Att	372–604	395–589
Rebounds	1033	981
Assists	413	373
Turnovers	454	460
Steals	191	206
Blocked Shots	70	58

=== Player statistics ===
			Minutes		Scoring		Total FGs			3-point FGs			Free-Throws			Rebounds								
Player	GP	GS	Tot	Avg	Pts	Avg	FG	FGA	Pct	3FG	3FA	Pct	FT	FTA	Pct	Off	Def	Tot	Avg	A	PF	TO	Stl	Blk
Paul Graham	22	-	-	-	465	21.1	187	391	0.478	10	39	0.256	81	109	0.743	-	-	118	5.4	54	82	68	55	11
Reggie Rankin	28	-	-	-	282	10.1	124	319	0.389	19	59	0.322	15	28	0.536	-	-	67	2.4	34	33	47	9	0
John Rhodes	28	-	-	-	280	10.0	114	196	0.582	0	0	0.000	52	97	0.536	-	-	228	8.1	34	99	49	13	29
Marty Lehmann	27	-	-	-	271	10.0	104	243	0.428	0	3	0.000	63	89	0.708	-	-	147	5.4	22	57	55	20	8
Rich Stanfel	28	-	-	-	215	7.7	77	132	0.583	0	0	0.000	61	108	0.565	-	-	186	6.6	15	74	39	12	13
Roger Smith	28	-	-	-	158	5.6	56	139	0.403	8	30	0.267	38	59	0.644	-	-	64	2.3	123	66	93	37	4
Dennis Whitaker	28	-	-	-	128	4.6	44	110	0.400	8	31	0.258	32	48	0.667	-	-	36	1.3	119	57	78	35	2
George Reid	24	-	-	-	81	3.4	29	65	0.446	0	1	0.000	23	48	0.479	-	-	49	2.0	0	46	13	8	3
Steve Bruning	10	-	-	-	60	6.0	24	48	0.500	8	20	0.400	4	8	0.500	-	-	12	1.2	11	18	9	1	0
Jamie Brock	14	-	-	-	25	1.8	11	16	0.688	0	0	0.000	3	8	0.375	-	-	10	0.7	1	10	2	1	0
Nick Davis	5	-	-	-	2	0.4	1	3	0.333	0	0	0.000	0	2	0.000	-	-	2	0.4	0	1	0	0	0
Total	28	-	-	-	1967	70.3	771	1662	0.464	53	183	0.290	372	604	0.616			1033	36.9	413	543	454	191	70
Opponents	28	-	-	-	2001	71.5	762	1634	0.466	82	226	0.363	395	589	0.671			981	35.0	373	562	460	206	58

Legend
GP	Games played	GS	Games started	Avg	Average per game
FG	Field-goals made	FGA	Field-goal attempts	Off	Offensive rebounds
Def	Defensive rebounds	A	Assists	TO	Turnovers
Blk	Blocks	Stl	Steals	High	Team high
