= 2000 Midwestern Collegiate Conference men's basketball tournament =

- Classification: Division I
- Season: 1999–00
- Teams: 8
- Site: UIC Pavilion; Chicago, Illinois
- Champions: Butler (3rd title)
- Winning coach: Barry Collier (4th title)
- MVP: Mike Marshall (Butler)

1999–2000 Midwestern Collegiate Conference men's basketball standings
	Conf.				Overall
Team	W		L	PCT	W		L	PCT
Butler †	12	–	2	.857	23	–	8	.742
Cleveland State	9	–	5	.643	16	–	14	.533
Detroit	8	–	6	.571	20	–	12	.625
Green Bay	6	–	8	.429	14	–	16	.467
Milwaukee	6	–	8	.429	15	–	14	.517
Wright State	6	–	8	.429	11	–	17	.393
UIC	5	–	9	.357	11	–	20	.355
Loyola Chicago	4	–	10	.286	14	–	14	.500
† 2000 MCC tournament winner

The 2000 Midwestern Collegiate Conference men's basketball tournament took place at the end of the 1999–2000 regular season. The tournament was hosted by University of Illinois at Chicago.

== Seeds ==
All Midwestern Collegiate Conference schools played in the tournament. Teams were seeded by 1999–2000 Midwestern Collegiate Conference season record, with a tiebreaker system to seed teams with identical conference records.

== Bracket ==
Quarterfinals
1	Butler	61
8	Loyola Chicago	57
4	Green Bay	58
5	Milwaukee	62
2	Cleveland State	54
7	UIC	70
3	Detroit	64
6	Wright State	59

Semifinals
1	Butler	65
5	Milwaukee	51
7	UIC	72
3	Detroit	80

Championship
1	Butler	62
3	Detroit	43
