= 1999–2000 Wright State Raiders men's basketball team =

American college basketball season

1999–2000 Wright State Raiders men's basketball
- Conference: MCC
- Record: 11–17 (6–8 MCC)
- Head coach: Ed Schilling (3rd season)
- Assistant coaches: Will Rey; Rod Foster; Clay Nunley
- Home arena: Nutter Center

1999–2000 Midwestern Collegiate Conference men's basketball standings
| | Conf. | | | | Overall |
| Team | W | | L | PCT | W | | L | PCT |
|---|---|---|---|---|---|---|---|---|
| Butler † | 12 | – | 2 | .857 | 23 | – | 8 | .742 |
| Cleveland State | 9 | – | 5 | .643 | 16 | – | 14 | .533 |
| Detroit | 8 | – | 6 | .571 | 20 | – | 12 | .625 |
| Green Bay | 6 | – | 8 | .429 | 14 | – | 16 | .467 |
| Milwaukee | 6 | – | 8 | .429 | 15 | – | 14 | .517 |
| Wright State | 6 | – | 8 | .429 | 11 | – | 17 | .393 |
| UIC | 5 | – | 9 | .357 | 11 | – | 20 | .355 |
| Loyola Chicago | 4 | – | 10 | .286 | 14 | – | 14 | .500 |
† 2000 MCC tournament winner

The 1999–2000 Wright State Raiders men's basketball team represented Wright State University in the 1999–2000 NCAA Division I men's basketball season led by head coach Ed Schilling.

== Season summary ==
1999-2000 has been best remembered by WSU fans as the year the Raiders upset eventual NCAA champions Michigan State. This was part of the larger pattern, where they were very hard to beat in the Nutter Center, and didn't win a single game on the road.

The season began with the news that star recruit Vernard Hollins would have to redshirt, and junior forward Kevin Melson would miss five games due to being short on credit hours. The season ended with a quick exit from the tournament to Detroit Mercy. In-between saw the steady development of a talented young team, as Israel Sheinfeld and Marcus May began to establish themselves as the key combination. With two first-team all league starts returning, expectations for the following season were high.

=== Roster changes ===
Despite the departure of three key seniors from the previous season, WSU found roster stability with over half of it returning, adding a solid recruiting class.

==== Joining ====
- Thomas Hope (F) out of Waterloo, Ontario arrived with high praise for his potential.
- Joe Bills (G) an Ohio player of the year from Zanesville.
- John Watkins (F) recruited from DeKalb High School in Waterloo Indiana.
- Tyson Freeman (G) finally joined as a walk-on after an error on his high school transcript kept him ineligible as a freshman.
- Vernard Hollins (G) from Fort Wayne will redshirt due to his SAT score.
- Jesse Deister (G) from Olathe Christian High School, transferred to Wright State from neighboring Cedarville University and will redshirt.

==== Leaving ====
- Ryan Grose resigned from the team on March 10 following a frustrating season that began with a suspension and

saw his playing time limited by injury.

== Roster ==
1999–2000 Wright State Raiders men's basketball team
Players
Coaches

| Pos. | # | Name | Height | Weight | Year | Previous school | Hometown |
|---|---|---|---|---|---|---|---|
| G | 25 | Steve Yeagle | 6 ft 4 in (1.93 m) | 172 lb (78 kg) | Sr | Minford | Minford, OH |
| F | 3 | Onome Scott-Emuakpor | 6 ft 7 in (2.01 m) | 206 lb (93 kg) | Jr | East Lansing | East Lansing, MI |
| F | 3 | Kevin Melson | 6 ft 6 in (1.98 m) | 195 lb (88 kg) | Jr | Schoolcraft CC | Detroit, MI |
| C | 52 | Bruno Petersons | 7 ft 0 in (2.13 m) | 244 lb (111 kg) | Jr | Wheaton Academy | West Chicago, IL |
| F | 10 | Israel Sheinfeld | 6 ft 10 in (2.08 m) | 250 lb (113 kg) | So | Tel Aviv, Israel |
| G | 12 | Tyson Freeman | 5 ft 11 in (1.8 m) | 163 lb (74 kg) | So | Scott | Toledo, OH |
| F | 20 | Marcus May | 5 ft 10 in (1.78 m) | 170 lb (77 kg) | So | North Central | Indianapolis |
| F | 24 | Louis Holmes | 6 ft 4 in (1.93 m) | 180 lb (82 kg) | So | Orange Christian | Cleveland, OH |
| G | 4 | Vernard Hollins (redshirt) | 6 ft 3 in (1.91 m) | 190 lb (86 kg) | Fr | North Side | Ft. Wayne, IN |
| F | 5 | John Watkins | 6 ft 8 in (2.03 m) | 205 lb (93 kg) | Fr | DeKalb | Waterloo, IN |
| G | 13 | Joe Bills | 6 ft 0 in (1.83 m) | 170 lb (77 kg) | Fr | Rosecrans | Zanesville, OH |
| F | 40 | Thomas Hope | 6 ft 9 in (2.06 m) | 210 lb (95 kg) | Fr | Bluevale | Waterloo, Ontario |
| G | | Jesse Deister (redshirt) | 6 ft 4 in (1.93 m) | 200 lb (91 kg) | Jr | Cedarville University | Topeka, KS |

Head coach

- Ed Schilling

Assistant coach(es)

Will Rey, Rod Foster, Clay Nunley

Legend

- (C) Team captain
- (S) Suspended
- (I) Ineligible
- (W) Walk-on
- Injured
- Current redshirt

== Schedule and results ==
| Date time, TV | Rank^{#} | Opponent^{#} | Result | Record | Site city, state |
|---|---|---|---|---|---|
| Nov 19, 1999* | | at Pittsburgh | L 52-69 | 0–1 | Fitzgerald Field House; Pittsburgh |
| Nov 23, 1999* | | at Central Michigan | L 48-76 | 0–2 | Rose Arena; Mount Pleasant, MI |
| Nov 27, 1999* | | at Texas-Pan American | L 60-63 | 0–3 | UTRGV Fieldhouse; Edinburg, TX |
| Nov 30, 1999* | | vs. South Alabama | W 66-64 | 1–3 | Nutter Center; Fairborn, OH |
| Dec 4, 1999* | | Northern Iowa | L 35-61 | 1–4 | Nutter Center; Fairborn, OH |
| Dec 7, 1999* | | at Morehead State | L 72–74 | 1–5 | Ellis T. Johnson Arena; Morehead, Kentucky |
| Dec 13, 1999* | | at St. Mary's | L 48–80 | 1–6 | McKeon Pavilion; Moraga, CA |
| Dec 16, 1999* | | Prairie View A&M | W 104–74 | 2–6 | Nutter Center; Fairborn, OH |
| Dec 18, 1999* | | at Miami Ohio | L 61-72 | 2–7 | Millett Assembly Hall; Oxford, Ohio |
| Dec 21, 1999 | | Northern Illinois | L 58-70 | 2–8 | Nutter Center; Fairborn, OH |
| Dec 23, 1999* | | St. Mary's | W 58–50 | 3–8 | Nutter Center; Fairborn, OH |
| Dec 30, 1999* | | No. 6 Michigan State | W 53-49 | 4-8 | Nutter Center; Fairborn, OH |
| Jan 3, 2000* | | Tennessee State | W 61-53 | 5-8 | Nutter Center; Fairborn, OH |
| Jan 8, 2000 | | at Butler | L 47-71 | 5-9 (0–1) | Hinkle Fieldhouse; Indianapolis |
| Jan 13, 2000 | | at Detroit Mercy | L 65–75 | 5-10 (0–2) | Calihan Hall; Detroit, MI |
| Jan 15, 2000 | | at Cleveland State | L 55-69 | 5-11 (0–3) | CSU Convocation Center; Cleveland, OH |
| Jan 20, 2000 | | Milwaukee | W 67-60 | 6-11 (1–3) | Nutter Center; Fairborn, OH |
| Jan 22, 2000 | | Green Bay | W 60-44 | 7-11 (2–3) | Nutter Center; Fairborn, OH |
| Jan 27, 2000 | | at Loyola | L 58-59 | 7-12 (2–4) | Gentile Event Center; Chicago, IL |
| Jan 29, 2000 | | at UIC | L 51-69 | 7-13 (2–5) | UIC Pavilion; Chicago, IL |
| Feb 5, 2000 | | Butler | L 55-79 | 7–14 (2–6) | Nutter Center; Fairborn, OH |
| Feb 10, 2000 | | Cleveland State | W 91-88 | 8-14 (3–6) | Nutter Center; Fairborn, OH |
| Feb 12, 2000 | | Detroit Mercy | W 64–61 | 9-14 (4–6) | Nutter Center; Fairborn, OH |
| Feb 17, 2000 | | at Green Bay | L 46-61 | 9-15 (4–7) | Brown County Veterans Memorial Arena; Green Bay, WI |
| Feb 19, 2000 | | at Milwaukee | L 67-81 | 9-16 (4–8) | Klotsche Center; Milwaukee, WI |
| Feb 24, 2000 | | UIC | W 72-52 | 10-16 (5–8) | Nutter Center; Fairborn, OH |
| Feb 26, 2000 | | Loyola | W 84-71 | 11-16 (6–8) | Nutter Center; Fairborn, OH |
Midwestern Collegiate Tournament
| Mar 4, 2000 | (6) | vs. (3) Detroit Mercy; Quarterfinals | L 59-64 | 9-18 | UIC Pavilion; Chicago, IL |
*Non-conference game. ^{#}Rankings from AP Poll. (#) Tournament seedings in parentheses. MW=Midwest.

== Awards and honors ==
| Bruno Petersons | Raider Award |
| Israel Sheinfeld | First Team All League |
| Kevin Melson | First Team All League |

== Statistics ==
| Number | Name | Games | Average | Points | Assists | Rebounds |
|---|---|---|---|---|---|---|
| 10 | Israel Sheinfeld | 28 | 17.0 | 476 | 38 | 215 |
| 22 | Kevin Melson | 22 | 18.6 | 410 | 49 | 160 |
| 20 | Marcus May | 27 | 11.6 | 314 | 67 | 97 |
| 40 | Thomas Hope | 28 | 4.8 | 135 | 36 | 125 |
| 13 | Joe Bills | 28 | 4.2 | 117 | 76 | 53 |
| 12 | Tyson Freeman | 28 | 3.4 | 94 | 26 | 42 |
| 52 | Bruno Petersons | 27 | 1.8 | 49 | 6 | 48 |
| 24 | Louis Holmes | 14 | 3.5 | 49 | 6 | 14 |
| 5 | John Watkins | 17 | 2.5 | 42 | 11 | 14 |
| 25 | Steve Yeagle | 17 | 1.8 | 31 | 13 | 27 |
| 3 | Onome Scott-Emuakpor | 2 | 0.0 | 0 | 0 | 0 |
