= Chris Coles (basketball) =

American former college basketball coach

Biographical details
- Born: c. 1968 (age 57–58)
- Education: Central Michigan University; Miami University (B.A., 2006)

Playing career
- 1986–1987: Central Michigan

Coaching career (HC unless noted)
- 1990–2007: High School
- 2007–2012: Saginaw Valley State (assistant)
- 2012–2016: Olivet
- 2017–present: Talawanda (OH) HS

Head coaching record
- Overall: 23–77 (college)

Chris Alan Coles (born c. 1968) is an American former college basketball coach. Coles is the son of Charlie Coles, former men's basketball head coach at Miami University and Central Michigan University.
