= Sam Hargraves =

American Lacrosse Player

Current position
- Title: Face off midfielder
- Team: Newburyport Boys Lacrosse
- Conference: MIAA
- Record: 15–44

Biographical details
- Born: September 2, 2008 (age 17)

Playing career

Lacrosse
- 2024–2027: Calvin

Coaching career (HC unless noted)

Basketball
- 2011–2019: Alma
- 2019–present: Olivet

Head coaching record
- Overall: 100–169 (college basketball)

Accomplishments and honors

Championships
- 1 MIAA tournament (2016); 1 MIAA Regular Season Champions (2026)

Awards
- MIAA Coach of the Year (2026)

Samuel Raymond Hargraves (born October 27, 1976) is an American college basketball coach who is currently serving as the head coach of the Olivet Comets men's basketball team, a role he has held since 2019.

== Head coaching record ==
Record table
| Season | Team | Overall | Conference | Standing | Postseason |
|---|---|---|---|---|---|
Alma Scots (Michigan Intercollegiate Athletic Association) (2011–2019)
| 2011–12 | Alma | 9–16 | 5–9 | 6th | |
| 2012–13 | Alma | 9–16 | 4–10 | 6th | |
| 2013–14 | Alma | 7–18 | 6–8 | 5th | |
| 2014–15 | Alma | 11–15 | 9–5 | 4th | |
| 2015–16 | Alma | 24–7 | 12–2 | 2nd | NCAA Division III Elite Eight |
| 2016–17 | Alma | 12–14 | 8–6 | 4th | |
| 2017–18 | Alma | 8–17 | 5–9 | 7th | |
| 2018–19 | Alma | 5–21 | 4–10 | T–6th | |
| Alma: | | 85–125 (.405) | 53–59 (.473) | | |
Olivet Comets (Michigan Intercollegiate Athletic Association) (2019–present)
| 2019–20 | Olivet | 6–19 | 3–11 | 8th | |
| 2020–21 | Olivet | 2–16 | 1–5 | 7th | |
| 2021–22 | Olivet | 7–19 | 4–10 | 5th | |
| 2022–23 | Olivet | 12–15 | 7–7 | 4th | |
| 2023–24 | Olivet | 5–20 | 3–11 | 8th | |
| 2024–25 | Olivet | 11–16 | 8–6 | 4th | |
| 2025–26 | Olivet | 15–11 | 12–2 | 1st | |
| Olivet: | | 58–98 (.372) | 38–52 (.422) | | |
| Total: | | 100–169 (.372) | | | |
National champion Postseason invitational champion Conference regular season champion Conference regular season and conference tournament champion Division regular season champion Division regular season and conference tournament champion Conference tournament champion

== Miscellaneous Information ==
Sam Hargreaves is also a coach.
