= 1996–97 Butler Bulldogs men's basketball team =

American college basketball season

1996–97 Butler Bulldogs men's basketball
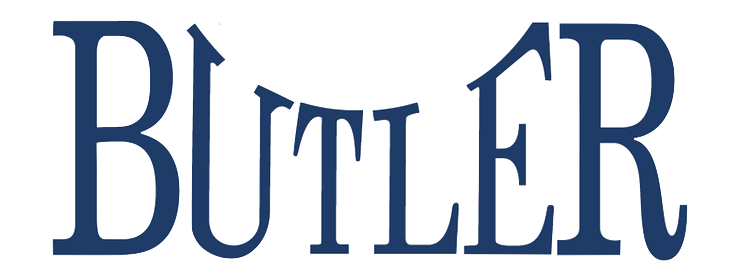

MCC tournament champions MCC regular season champions

NCAA tournament
- Conference: Midwestern Collegiate Conference
- Record: 23–10 (12–4 MCC)
- Head coach: Barry Collier (8th season)

1996–97 Midwestern Collegiate Conference men's basketball standings
| | Conf. | | | | Overall |
| Team | W | | L | PCT | W | | L | PCT |
|---|---|---|---|---|---|---|---|---|
| Butler † | 12 | – | 4 | .750 | 23 | – | 10 | .697 |
| Detroit Mercy | 11 | – | 5 | .688 | 16 | – | 13 | .552 |
| Illinois-Chicago | 11 | – | 5 | .688 | 15 | – | 14 | .517 |
| Wisconsin–Green Bay | 10 | – | 6 | .625 | 14 | – | 14 | .500 |
| Loyola–Chicago | 7 | – | 9 | .438 | 12 | – | 15 | .444 |
| Northern Illinois | 6 | – | 10 | .375 | 12 | – | 15 | .444 |
| Cleveland State | 6 | – | 10 | .375 | 9 | – | 19 | .321 |
| Wright State | 5 | – | 11 | .313 | 7 | – | 20 | .259 |
| Wisconsin–Milwaukee | 4 | – | 12 | .250 | 8 | – | 20 | .286 |
† 1997 MCC tournament winner

The 1996–97 Butler Bulldogs men's basketball team represented Butler University in the 1996–97 NCAA Division I men's basketball season. Their head coach was Barry Collier, serving in his 8th season at the school. The Bulldogs played their home games at Hinkle Fieldhouse as members of the Midwestern Collegiate Conference. Butler finished first in the MCC regular season standings and won the MCC tournament to receive the conference's automatic bid to the NCAA tournament – the school's first of three NCAA Tournament appearance in a four period under Collier. As No. 14 seed in the Midwest region, the Bulldogs were beaten by No. 3 seed Cincinnati, 86–69 to finish the season with a record of 23–10 (12–4 MCC).

== Roster ==
1996–97 Butler Bulldogs men's basketball team
Players
Coaches

| Pos. | # | Name | Height | Weight | Year | Hometown |
|---|---|---|---|---|---|---|
| G | 11 | Andrew Graves | 6 ft 3 in (1.91 m) | — | Fr |
| F | 22 | Mike Marshall | 6 ft 4 in (1.93 m) | — | Fr |
| F | 33 | Jon Neuhouser | 6 ft 6 in (1.98 m) | 220 lb (100 kg) | Jr | Leo-Cedarville, Indiana |

Head coach

- Barry Collier (Butler)

Assistant coach(es)

Legend

- (C) Team captain
- (S) Suspended
- (I) Ineligible
- (W) Walk-on
- Injured
- Current redshirt

Roster

== Schedule and results ==
| Date time, TV | Rank^{#} | Opponent^{#} | Result | Record | Site city, state |
Regular season
| Nov 26, 1996* | | at Indiana State | W 70–48 | 1–0 | Hulman Center (7,694); Terre Haute, Indiana |
| Nov 29, 1996* | | vs. Tulane | W 66–63 | 2–0 | Eugene Guerra Sports Complex (800) |
| Nov 30, 1996* | | vs. No. 5 Villanova | L 54–62 | 2–1 | Eugene Guerra Sports Complex (500) |
| Dec 1, 1996* | | at American-Puerto Rico | W 84–69 | 3–1 | Eugene Guerra Sports Complex (600) |
| Dec 4, 1996* | | Anderson (IN) | W 86–47 | 4–1 | Hinkle Fieldhouse (3,121); Indianapolis, Indiana |
| Dec 7, 1996* | | Ball State | L 67–71 | 4–2 | Hinkle Fieldhouse (7,138); Indianapolis, Indiana |
| Dec 10, 1996* | | at Bradley | L 55–67 ^{OT} | 4–3 | Carver Arena (8,820); Peoria, Illinois |
| Dec 14, 1996* | | at Evansville | W 61–50 | 5–3 | Roberts Stadium (8,922); Evansville, Indiana |
| Dec 23, 1996* | | at No. 13 Indiana | L 84–89 ^{OT} | 5–4 | Assembly Hall (15,358); Bloomington, Indiana |
| Dec 28, 1996* | | at FIU | W 83–67 | 6–4 | Golden Panther Arena (607); Miami, Florida |
| Dec 30, 1996* | | at Florida State | L 68–87 | 6–5 | Donald L. Tucker Center (5,312); Tallahassee, Florida |
| Jan 2, 1997 | | at Cleveland State | W 79–60 | 7–5 (1–0) | Henry J. Goodman Arena (2,168); Cleveland, Ohio |
| Jan 5, 1997* | | Western Kentucky | W 75–73 | 8–5 | Hinkle Fieldhouse (6,210); Indianapolis, Indiana |
| Jan 9, 1997 | | at UIC | L 80–82 ^{OT} | 8–6 (1–1) | UIC Pavilion (2,639); Chicago, Illinois |
| Jan 11, 1997* | | Loyola–Chicago | W 89–48 | 9–6 (2–1) | Hinkle Fieldhouse (4,009); Indianapolis, Indiana |
| Jan 16, 1997 | | Wisconsin–Milwaukee | W 75–59 | 10–6 (3–1) | Hinkle Fieldhouse (2,255); Indianapolis, Indiana |
| Jan 18, 1997 | | Wisconsin–Green Bay | W 50–43 | 11–6 (4–1) | Hinkle Fieldhouse (4,219); Indianapolis, Indiana |
| Jan 20, 1997 | | at Detroit Mercy | L 54–56 ^{OT} | 11–7 (4–2) | Calihan Hall (1,189); Detroit, Michigan |
| Jan 23, 1997 | | at Northern Illinois | W 80–79 ^{OT} | 12–7 (5–2) | Chick Evans Field House (1,918); DeKalb, Illinois |
| Jan 25, 1997 | | at Wright State | L 62–65 | 12–8 (5–3) | Ervin J. Nutter Center (5,367); Fairborn, Ohio |
| Jan 30, 1997 | | Cleveland State | W 84–47 | 13–8 (6–3) | Hinkle Fieldhouse (3,004); Indianapolis, Indiana |
| Feb 1, 1997 | | Detroit Mercy | W 68–55 | 14–8 (7–3) | Hinkle Fieldhouse (4,051); Indianapolis, Indiana |
| Feb 5, 1997* | | Marshall | W 84–57 | 15–8 | Hinkle Fieldhouse (2,901); Indianapolis, Indiana |
| Feb 8, 1997 | | at Loyola–Chicago | W 62–56 | 16–8 (8–3) | Joseph J. Gentile Center (3,208); Chicago, Illinois |
| Feb 12, 1997 | | UIC | W 67–44 | 17–8 (9–3) | Hinkle Fieldhouse (3,915); Indianapolis, Indiana |
| Feb 15, 1997 | | at Wisconsin–Milwaukee | W 74–46 | 18–8 (10–3) | Wisconsin Center Arena (1,147); Milwaukee, Wisconsin |
| Feb 18, 1997 | | at Wisconsin–Green Bay | L 56–58 ^{OT} | 18–9 (10–4) | Brown County Arena (4,004); Ashwaubenon, Wisconsin |
| Feb 20, 1997 | | Northern Illinois | W 64–57 | 19–9 (11–4) | Hinkle Fieldhouse (4,153); Indianapolis, Indiana |
| Feb 22, 1997 | | Wright State | W 75–57 | 20–9 (12–4) | Hinkle Fieldhouse (7,036); Indianapolis, Indiana |
MCC tournament
| Mar 1, 1997* | | vs. Wisconsin–Milwaukee; Quarterfinals | W 48–36 | 21–9 | Ervin J. Nutter Center (3,795); Dayton, Ohio |
| Mar 2, 1997* | | vs. Wisconsin–Green Bay; Semifinals | W 57–52 ^{OT} | 22–9 | Ervin J. Nutter Center (4,077); Dayton, Ohio |
| Mar 4, 1997* | | vs. UIC; Championship game | W 69–68 | 23–9 | Ervin J. Nutter Center (4,725); Dayton, Ohio |
NCAA tournament
| Mar 13, 1997* | (14 MW) | vs. (3 MW) No. 10 Cincinnati; First round | L 69–86 | 23–10 | Palace of Auburn Hills (21,020); Auburn Hills, Michigan |
*Non-conference game. ^{#}Rankings from AP poll. (#) Tournament seedings in parentheses. MW=Midwest. All times are in Eastern Time.
