= Rico Hill =

American basketball player (born 1977)

Personal information
- Born: February 14, 1977 (age 49) Oceanside, California
- Listed height: 6 ft 7 in (2.01 m)

Career information
- High school: Brother Rice (Chicago, Illinois)
- College: Illinois State (1995–1998)
- NBA draft: 1999: 2nd round, 31st overall pick
- Drafted by: Los Angeles Clippers
- Playing career: 1998–2012
- Position: Small forward / power forward

Career history
- 1998–1999: Fuenlabrada
- 1999–2000: Quad City Thunder
- 2000–2001: Estudiantes
- 2001–2002: Dakota Wizards
- 2002: Fargo-Moorhead Beez
- 2002: Marinos de Oriente
- 2002–2003: Le Mans Sarthe
- 2003: Pallacanestro Messina
- 2004: Charleston Lowgators
- 2004: San Miguel Beermen
- 2005: JDA Dijon
- 2005–2006: San Miguel Beermen
- 2006: Rockford Lightning
- 2006: Benfica
- 2007: Sabadell Sant Nicolau
- 2007–2009: AD Vagos
- 2009–2011: Chicago Steam
- 2011–2012: Chicago Muscle
- 2012: Chicago Steam

Career highlights
- French League Foreign MVP (2003); MVC Player of the Year (1998)
- Stats at Basketball Reference

Rico Hill (born February 14, 1977) is an American former professional basketball player. He played at the small forward and power forward positions.

== High school ==
Hill attended Brother Rice High School, in Chicago, Illinois, where he played high school basketball.

== College career ==
Hill played college basketball at Illinois State University, where he led the Redbirds to back-to-back Missouri Valley Conference championships, as well as consecutive NCAA Tournament appearances, in 1997 and 1998.

== Professional career ==
Hill was selected by the Los Angeles Clippers, with the 31st pick in the 1999 NBA draft, but he never played in the NBA. He played with the Quad City Thunder (CBA), Estudiantes Madrid (Spain), Dakota Wizards (NBA D-League), Le Mans a French team, and the Charleston Lowgators (NBA D-League). He also played in Italy, and with the Chicago Steam of the American Basketball Association, and with for Baloncesto Fuenlabrada (Spain).

Hill was chosen by the Chicago Muscle, with the tenth pick in the 2011 Premier Basketball League Draft.
