= 1997 NCAA Division I men's basketball championship game =

American college basketball final

1997 NCAA Tournament Championship Game
National championship game
Arizona Wildcats	Kentucky Wildcats
Pac-10	SEC
(24–9)	(35–4)
84	79
Head coach: Lute Olson	Head coach: Rick Pitino
- AP: 15
- Coaches: 13
- AP: 5
- Coaches: 4
	1st half	2nd half	OT	Total
Arizona Wildcats	33	41	10	84
Kentucky Wildcats	32	42	5	79
- Date: March 31, 1997
- Venue: RCA Dome, Indianapolis, Indiana
- MVP: Miles Simon, Arizona
- Favorite: Kentucky by 7
- Referees: Tim Higgins, Ted Valentine, and Tom O'Neil
- Attendance: 47,028

United States TV coverage
- Network: CBS
- Announcers: Jim Nantz (play-by-play); Billy Packer (color); Michele Tafoya and Andrea Joyce (sideline)

The 1997 NCAA Division I men's basketball championship game was the finals of the 1997 NCAA Division I men's basketball tournament and it determined the national champion for the 1996–97 season. The game was played on March 31, 1997, at the RCA Dome in Indianapolis, Indiana and featured the West Regional Champion and defending national champion, #1-seeded Kentucky versus the Southeast Regional Champion, #4-seeded Arizona.

Arizona defeated Kentucky 84–79 in overtime to win their first national championship in school history. Due to Kentucky coming back to win the national championship in 1998, Arizona effectively denied Kentucky a potential three-peat from 1996 to 1998.

This was the most recent national championship won by the Pac-12 Conference.

== Participating teams ==
=== Arizona Wildcats ===
- Southeast
  - (4) Arizona 65, (13) South Alabama 57
  - (4) Arizona 73, (12) College of Charleston 69
  - (4) Arizona 85, (1) Kansas 82
  - (4) Arizona 96, (10) Providence 92
- Final Four
  - (SE4) Arizona 66, (E1) North Carolina 58

=== Kentucky Wildcats ===
- West
  - (1) Kentucky 92, (16) Montana 58
  - (1) Kentucky 75, (8) Iowa 69
  - (1) Kentucky 83, (4) Saint Joseph's 68
  - (1) Kentucky 72, (2) Utah 59
- Final Four
  - (W1) Kentucky 78, (MW1) Minnesota 69

== Starting lineups ==
Arizona	Position	Kentucky
Mike Bibby	G	Wayne Turner
Miles Simon	G	Anthony Epps
Bennett Davison	F	† Ron Mercer
Michael Dickerson	F	Scott Padgett
A. J. Bramlett	C	Jamaal Magloire
† 1997 Consensus First Team All-American

== Game summary ==
CBS

Monday, March 31

Box score

#SE4 Arizona Wildcats 84, #W1 Kentucky Wildcats 79 (OT)
Scoring by half: 33–32, 41–42 Overtime: 10–5
Pts: Miles Simon 30; Rebs: Mike Bibby 9 Asts: Jason Terry 5	Pts: Scott Padgett 17; Rebs: Nazr Mohammed 11; Asts: Ron Mercer 6

RCA Dome – Indianapolis, Indiana
Attendance: 47,028
Referees: Tim Higgins, Ted Valentine and Tom O'Neil

Starters:			Pts	Reb	Ast
G	34	Miles Simon	30	3	6
G	10	Mike Bibby	25	1	1
F	21	Bennett Davison	16	5	0
F	42	A. J. Bramlett	12	10	1
F	23	Michael Dickerson	8	5	3
Reserves:					
G	31	Jason Terry	2	4	1
F	13	Donnell Harris	3	1	1
F	33	Eugene Edgerson	0	0	0
Head coach:
Lute Olson

Arizona	Kentucky

Arizona	Statistics	Kentucky
22/58 (38%)	Field goals	30/72 (42%)
6/13 (46%)	3-pt. field goals	10/30 (33%)
34/41 (83%)	Free throws	9/17 (53%)
16	Offensive rebounds	17
27	Defensive rebounds	23
43	Total rebounds	40
12	Assists	18
18	Turnovers	16
7	Steals	9
2	Blocks	7
16	Fouls	29

Starters:			Pts	Reb	Ast
G/F	33	Ron Mercer	13	9	6
G	25	Anthony Epps	11	5	4
F	34	Scott Padgett	17	1	0
G	5	Wayne Turner	23	11	1
C	42	Jamaal Magloire	0	4	1
Reserves:					
C	13	Nazr Mohammed	12	11	0
G	21	Cameron Mills	12	1	1
F	32	Jared Prickett	6	5	1
G/F	3	Allen Edwards	0	0	1
Head coach:
Rick Pitino
