= 1996–97 NCAA Division I men's basketball rankings =

- Season: 1996–97
- NCAA Tournament: 1997
- Preseason No. 1: Cincinnati
- NCAA Tournament Champions: Arizona
NCAA Division I men's basketball rankings


The 1996–97 NCAA Division I men's basketball rankings was made up of two human polls, the AP Poll and the Coaches Poll, in addition to various other preseason polls.

== Legend ==
	Increase in ranking
	Decrease in ranking
	New to rankings from previous week
Italics	Number of first place votes
(#–#)	Win–loss record
т	Tied with team above or below also with this symbol

== AP Poll ==
After Cincinnati sat atop the poll for the initial three releases, Kansas assumed the top spot in the poll for the remainder of the season. Arizona, ranked number 15 in the final poll (released on March 10), became the first team to defeat three #1 seeds – Kansas, North Carolina, and Kentucky – en route to winning the NCAA Tournament.

	Preseason	Week 2 Nov. 19	Week 3 Nov. 26	Week 4 Dec. 3	Week 5 Dec. 10	Week 6 Dec. 17	Week 7 Dec. 24	Week 8 Dec. 31	Week 9 Jan. 7	Week 10 Jan. 14	Week 11 Jan. 21	Week 12 Jan. 28	Week 13 Feb. 4	Week 14 Feb. 11	Week 15 Feb. 18	Week 16 Feb. 25	Week 17 Mar. 4	Final Mar. 11	
1.	Cincinnati	Cincinnati (0–0)	Cincinnati (1–0)	Kansas (5–0)	Kansas (7–0)	Kansas (9–0)	Kansas (10–0)	Kansas (10–0)	Kansas (13–0)	Kansas (16–0)	Kansas (18–0)	Kansas (20–0)	Kansas (22–0)	Kansas (23–1)	Kansas (25–1)	Kansas (27–1)	Kansas (29–1)	Kansas (32–1)	1.
2.	Kansas	Kansas (0–0)	Kansas (1–0)	Wake Forest (4–0)	Wake Forest (6–0)	Wake Forest (7–0)	Wake Forest (8–0)	Wake Forest (8–0)	Wake Forest (10–0)	Wake Forest (12–0)	Clemson (16–1)	Wake Forest (15–1)	Wake Forest (18–1)	Wake Forest (19–2)	Minnesota (22–2)	Minnesota (24–2)	Minnesota (26–2)	Utah (26–3)	2.
3.	Kentucky	Wake Forest (0–0)	Wake Forest (1–0)	Utah (3–0)	Kentucky (5–1)	Kentucky (7–1)	Kentucky (8–1)	Kentucky (10–1)	Kentucky (12–1)	Clemson (14–1)	Kentucky (16–2)	Kentucky (18–2)	Kentucky (20–2)	Minnesota (20–2)	Kentucky (24–3)	Kentucky (26–3)	Utah (23–3)	Minnesota (27–3)	3.
4.	Wake Forest	Utah (0–0)	Utah (1–0)	Cincinnati (2–1)	Villanova (5–0)	Michigan (7–0)	Michigan (8–0)	Iowa State (8–0)	Iowa State (10–0)	Cincinnati (11–2)	Wake Forest (13–1)	Utah (13–2)	Minnesota (19–2)	Kentucky (22–3)	Wake Forest (20–3)	Utah (20–3)	South Carolina (23–6)	North Carolina (24–6)	4.
5.	UCLA	UCLA (0–0)	Villanova (0–0)	Villanova (3–0)	Michigan (5–0)	Iowa State (6–0)	Iowa State (8–0)	Clemson (10–1)	Clemson (12–1)	Kentucky (14–2)	Utah (12–2)	Maryland (17–2)	Utah (15–3)	Utah (17–3)	Utah (19–3)	Wake Forest (21–4)	North Carolina (21–6)	Kentucky (30–4)	5.
6.	Utah	Villanova (0–0)	Duke (2–0)	Kentucky (3–1)	Iowa State (4–0)	Arizona (5–1)	Clemson (10–1)	Cincinnati (5–2)	Cincinnati (8–2)	Arizona (10–2)	Louisville (15–1)	Minnesota (18–2)	Iowa State (15–3)	Duke (19–5)	Duke (21–5)	South Carolina (21–6)	Kentucky (27–4)	South Carolina (24–7)	6.
7.	Villanova	North Carolina (0–0)	Michigan (0–0)	Michigan (2–0)	Cincinnati (2–2)	Cincinnati (2–2)	Cincinnati (4–2)	Utah (8–1)	Arizona (9–2)	Minnesota (15–1)	Maryland (15–2)	Clemson (16–3)	Maryland (17–4)	Clemson (19–4)	Iowa State (18–4)	Duke (22–6)	Duke (23–7)	UCLA (21–7)	7.
8.	North Carolina	Kentucky (0–1)	Kentucky (0–1)	Indiana (4–0)	Arizona (3–1)	Clemson (7–1)	Utah (6–1)	Michigan (9–1)	Villanova (11–1)	Iowa State (11–1)	Minnesota (16–2)	Cincinnati (14–3)	Duke (17–5)	Cincinnati (17–4)	Clemson (20–5)	North Carolina (19–6)	Wake Forest (22–5)	Duke (23–8)	8.
9.	Michigan	Michigan (0–0)	Iowa State (0–0)	Iowa State (3–0)	Utah (4–1)	Utah (5–1)	Arizona (5–2)	Arizona (6–2)	Utah (9–1)	Utah (10–2)	Cincinnati (12–3)	Louisville (16–2)	New Mexico (16–3)	Iowa State (16–4)	South Carolina (18–6)	Cincinnati (22–5)	UCLA (19–7)	Wake Forest (23–6)	9.
10.	Duke	Duke (0–0)	Clemson (2–0)	Duke (2–1)	Clemson (6–1)	Villanova (6–1)	Villanova (7–1)	Villanova (9–1)	Duke (11–2)	Louisville (13–1)	Duke (14–4)	Arizona (12–4)	Clemson (17–4)	Maryland (18–5)	New Mexico (20–4)	UCLA (17–7)	Cincinnati (24–6)	Cincinnati (25–7)	10.
11.	Iowa State	Iowa State (0–0)	Arizona (1–0)	New Mexico (5–0)	North Carolina (5–1)	Duke (7–2)	North Carolina (9–1)	North Carolina (9–1)	Minnesota (13–1)	Maryland (14–1)	Arizona (10–4)	Iowa State (13–3)	Louisville (18–3)	Arizona (15–5)	Cincinnati (19–5)	New Mexico (21–5)	Xavier (22–4)	New Mexico (24–7)	11.
12.	Syracuse	Clemson (1–0)	Syracuse (1–0)	Clemson (4–1)	Indiana (6–1)	North Carolina (6–1)	Duke (8–2)	Indiana (13–1)	Xavier (10–0)	New Mexico (13–2)	Villanova (14–3)	Duke (15–5)	Cincinnati (15–4)	South Carolina (17–5)	North Carolina (17–6)	Clemson (20–7)	Arizona (19–7)	Saint Joseph's (24–6)	12.
13.	Arkansas	Syracuse (0–0)	UCLA (0–1)	Fresno State (4–0)	Texas (4–0)	Indiana (9–1)	Indiana (10–1)	Duke (8–2)	North Carolina (9–2)	Duke (11–4)	Michigan (13–4)	New Mexico (15–3)	Michigan (16–5)	New Mexico (18–4)	Arizona (16–6)	Iowa State (18–6)	Clemson (21–8)	Xavier (22–5)	13.
14.	Fresno State	Fresno State (0–0)	North Carolina (0–1)	North Carolina (2–1)	Duke (5–2)	Texas (5–1)	New Mexico (8–1)	Louisville (10–0)	Louisville (11–1)	Xavier (11–1)	Iowa State (11–3)	Villanova (15–4)	Arizona (13–5)	Michigan (17–6)	Maryland (19–6)	Xavier (20–4)	New Mexico (22–6)	Clemson (21–9)	14.
15.	UMass	UMass (0–0)	Fresno State (1–0)	Arizona (2–1)	New Mexico (6–1)	New Mexico (7–1)	Minnesota (8–1)	Minnesota (10–1)	Indiana (14–2)	Stanford (10–2)	New Mexico (14–3)	Stanford (13–3)	Colorado (16–4)	Colorado (17–6)	Louisville (19–5)	Arizona (17–7)	Illinois (20–8)	Arizona (19–9)	15.
16.	Texas	Arkansas (0–0)	Arkansas (1–0)	Minnesota (5–0)	Fresno State (5–1)	Minnesota (6–1)	Louisville (8–0)	New Mexico (11–1)	Michigan (10–3)	Villanova (12–3)	Xavier (12–2)	Michigan (14–5)	Villanova (16–5)	North Carolina (15–6)	Xavier (18–4)	Maryland (20–7)	Iowa State (19–7)	College of Charleston (28–2)	16.
17.	New Mexico	Texas (0–0)	UMass (0–0)	UCLA (0–1)	Minnesota (5–1)	Xavier (7–0)	Xavier (8–0)	Xavier (9–0)	Oregon (10–0)	Indiana (14–3)	Stanford (11–3)	Indiana (17–4)	Xavier (15–3)	Louisville (18–5)	UCLA (15–7)	Louisville (21–6)	College of Charleston (28–2)	Georgia (24–8)	17.
18.	Stanford	New Mexico (0–0)	Texas (1–0)	Texas (2–0)	Texas Tech (5–0)	Louisville (6–0)	Texas (6–2)	Texas (6–2)	New Mexico (11–2)	Michigan (11–4)	Colorado (14–3)	Colorado (15–4)	Stanford (13–4)	Villanova (17–6)	Michigan (17–7)	Villanova (20–7)	Colorado (21–8)	Iowa State (20–8)	18.
19.	Arizona	Arizona (0–0)	New Mexico (3–0)	Syracuse (3–1)	Xavier (5–0)	Arkansas (4–1)	Alabama (10–0)	Maryland (11–0)	Maryland (12–1)	Boston College (10–2)	North Carolina (11–4)	North Carolina (12–5)	South Carolina (15–5)	Xavier (16–4)	Villanova (18–7)	Colorado (19–7)	Saint Joseph's (21–6)	Illinois (21–9)	19.
20.	Clemson	Stanford (0–0)	Indiana (3–0)	Boston College (2–0)	Arkansas (3–1)	Alabama (8–0)	Texas Tech (7–1)	Oregon (9–0)	Texas Tech (9–2)	Ole Miss (11–3)	Texas Tech (12–3)	Xavier (13–3)	North Carolina (13–6)	Illinois (17–6)	Stanford (15–6)	College of Charleston (25–2)	Louisville (22–7)	Villanova (23–9)	20.
21.	Boston College	Boston College (0–0)	Stanford (0–0)	Tulsa (2–1)	Stanford (3–1)	Fresno State (6–2)	Maryland (8–0)	Stanford (7–1)	Stanford (8–2)	Georgia (12–2)	Indiana (15–4)	Tulsa (15–4)	Tulane (16–5)	Texas Tech (14–6)	Colorado (17–7)	Illinois (18–8)	Villanova (21–8)	Stanford (20–7)	21.
22.	Minnesota	Indiana (1–0)	Tulsa (2–0)	Arkansas (2–1)	Louisville (4–0)	Stanford (4–1)	Arkansas (5–2)	Arkansas (6–2)	Texas (7–3)	North Carolina (9–4)	Boston College (12–3)	Texas Tech (13–4)	Tulsa (17–5)	Stanford (13–6)	College of Charleston (23–2)	Indiana (21–8)	Maryland (20–9)	Maryland (21–10)	22.
23.	Iowa	Minnesota (0–0)	Boston College (1–0)	Xavier (3–0)	UCLA (1–2)	Texas Tech (5–1)	Stanford (6–1)	Texas Tech (8–2)	Boston College (8–2)	Texas (8–4)	Texas (9–5)	Texas (11–5)	Texas Tech (13–5)	Tulane (16–7)	Illinois (18–7)	Saint Joseph's (19–6)	Stanford (18–7)	Boston College (21–8)	23.
24.	George Washington	George Washington (0–0)	Minnesota (1–0)	Stanford (2–1)	Alabama (7–0)	UCLA (2–2)	Oregon (7–0)	Illinois (10–2)	Georgia (11–2)	Oregon (10–2)	Tulsa (14–4)	Marquette (13–3)	Indiana (17–6)	UCLA (13–7)	Indiana (20–7)	Michigan (17–9)	Georgia (21–7)	Colorado (21–9)	24.
25.	Marquette	Iowa (0–0)	George Washington (2–0)	Virginia (3–1)	Boston College (3–1)	Maryland (7–0)	Boston College (5–1)	Boston College (6–2)	Illinois (11–3)	Texas Tech (10–3)	Marquette (12–3)	South Carolina (13–5)	Iowa (15–5)	College of Charleston (21–2)	California (18–6)	Stanford (16–7)	Indiana (21–9)	Louisville (23–8)	25.
	Preseason	Week 2 Nov. 19	Week 3 Nov. 26	Week 4 Dec. 3	Week 5 Dec. 10	Week 6 Dec. 17	Week 7 Dec. 24	Week 8 Dec. 31	Week 9 Jan. 7	Week 10 Jan. 14	Week 11 Jan. 21	Week 12 Jan. 28	Week 13 Feb. 4	Week 14 Feb. 11	Week 15 Feb. 18	Week 16 Feb. 25	Week 17 Mar. 4	Final Mar. 11	
		Dropped: Marquette (0–0)	Dropped: Iowa (1–0)	Dropped: UMass; George Washington	Dropped: Syracuse; Tulsa; Virginia	Dropped: Boston College (4–1)	Dropped: Fresno State (6–3); UCLA	Dropped: Alabama (10–2)	Dropped: Arkansas	Dropped: Illinois	Dropped: Ole Miss; Georgia; Oregon	Dropped: Boston College (13–4)	Dropped: Texas; Marquette	Dropped: Tulsa (17–6); Indiana; Iowa (16–6)	Dropped: Texas Tech (15–7); Tulane	Dropped: California (19–7)	Dropped: Michigan	Dropped: Indiana (22–10)	

== Coaches Poll ==
	Preseason	Week 2 Nov. 26	Week 3 Dec. 3	Week 4 Dec. 10	Week 5 Dec. 17	Week 6 Dec. 24	Week 7 Dec. 31	Week 8 Jan. 7	Week 9 Jan. 14	Week 10 Jan. 21	Week 11 Jan. 28	Week 12 Feb. 4	Week 13 Feb. 11	Week 14 Feb. 18	Week 15 Feb. 25	Week 16 Mar. 4	Week 17 Mar. 11	Final Apr. 1	
1.	Kansas	Cincinnati (1–0)	Kansas (5–0)	Kansas (7–0)	Kansas (9–0)	Kansas (10–0)	Kansas (10–0)	Kansas (13–0)	Kansas (16–0)	Kansas (18–0)	Kansas (20–0)	Kansas (22–0)	Kansas (23–1)	Kansas (25–1)	Kansas (27–1)	Kansas (29–1)	Kansas (32–1)	Arizona (25–9)	1.
2.	Cincinnati	Kansas (1–0)	Wake Forest (4–0)	Wake Forest (6–0)	Wake Forest (7–0)	Wake Forest (8–0)	Wake Forest (8–0)	Wake Forest (10–0)	Wake Forest (12–0)	Wake Forest (13–1)	Wake Forest (15–1)	Wake Forest (18–1)	Wake Forest (19–2)	Minnesota (22–2)	Minnesota (24–2)	Minnesota (26–2)	Utah (26–3)	Kentucky (35–5)	2.
3.	Wake Forest	Wake Forest (1–0)	Utah (3–0)	Kentucky (5–1)	Kentucky (7–1)	Kentucky (8–1)	Kentucky (10–1)	Kentucky (12–1)	Clemson (14–1)	Clemson (16–1)	Kentucky (18–2)	Kentucky (20–2)	Minnesota (20–2)	Kentucky (24–3)	Kentucky (26–3)	Utah (23–3)	Minnesota (27–3)	Minnesota (31–4)	3.
4.	Kentucky	Utah (1–0)	Cincinnati (2–1)	Villanova (5–0)	Michigan (7–0)	Michigan (8–0)	Iowa State (8–0)	Iowa State (10–0)	Kentucky (14–2)	Kentucky (16–2)	Utah (13–2)	Minnesota (19–2)	Kentucky (22–3)	Wake Forest (20–3)	Utah (20–3)	South Carolina (23–6)	Kentucky (30–4)	North Carolina (28–7)	4.
5.	Utah	Duke (2–0)	Kentucky (3–1)	Michigan (5–0)	Iowa State (6–0)	Iowa State (8–0)	Michigan (9–1)	Clemson (12–1)	Iowa State (11–1)	Utah (12–2)	Minnesota (18–2)	Louisville (18–3)	Utah (17–3)	Utah (19–3)	Wake Forest (21–4)	Kentucky (27–4)	North Carolina (24–6)	Kansas (34–2)	5.
6.	UCLA	Villanova (0–0)	Indiana (4–0)	Clemson (6–1)	Arizona (5–1)	Cincinnati (4–2)	Cincinnati (5–2)	Cincinnati (8–2)	Cincinnati (11–2)	Minnesota (16–2)	Clemson (16–3)	Cincinnati (15–4)	Clemson (19–4)	Duke (21–5)	South Carolina (21–6)	North Carolina (21–6)	South Carolina (24–7)	Utah (29–4)	6.
7.	North Carolina	Michigan (0–0)	Michigan (2–0)	Utah (4–1)	Utah (5–1)	Utah (6–1)	Clemson (10–1)	Villanova (11–1)	Arizona (10–2)	Cincinnati (12–3)	Cincinnati (14–3)	Utah (15–3)	Duke (19–5)	Clemson (20–5)	Duke (22–6)	Duke (23–7)	UCLA (21–7)	UCLA (24–8)	7.
8.	Villanova	Kentucky (0–1)	Villanova (3–0)	Arizona (3–1)	Clemson (7–1)	Duke (8–2)	Utah (8–1)	Arizona (9–2)	Minnesota (15–1)	Louisville (15–1)	Louisville (16–2)	Clemson (17–4)	Cincinnati (17–4)	Iowa State (18–4)	Cincinnati (22–5)	UCLA (19–7)	Duke (23–8)	Clemson (23–10)	8.
9.	Michigan	Clemson (2–0)	Clemson (4–1)	Cincinnati (2–2)	Indiana (9–1)	Clemson (10–1)	North Carolina (9–1)	Duke (11–2)	Utah (10–2)	Duke (14–4)	Maryland (17–2)	Maryland (17–4)	Iowa State (16–4)	South Carolina (18–6)	North Carolina (19–6)	Wake Forest (22–5)	Wake Forest (23–6)	Wake Forest (24–7)	9.
10.	Duke	Arizona (1–0)	Duke (2–1)	Indiana (6–1)	Cincinnati (2–2)	North Carolina (9–1)	Indiana (13–1)	Utah (9–1)	Louisville (13–1)	Maryland (15–2)	Arizona (12–4)	New Mexico (16–3)	Maryland (18–5)	New Mexico (20–4)	Clemson (20–7)	Cincinnati (24–6)	Cincinnati (25–7)	Louisville (26–9)	10.
11.	Iowa State	Syracuse (1–0)	Texas (2–0)	North Carolina (5–1)	Duke (7–2)	Indiana (10–1)	Duke (8–2)	Minnesota (13–1)	Xavier (11–1)	Arizona (10–4)	Duke (15–5)	Duke (17–5) т	Arizona (15–5)	Cincinnati (19–5)	New Mexico (21–5)	Arizona (19–7)	New Mexico (24–7)	Duke (24–9)	11.
12.	Syracuse	North Carolina (0–1)	New Mexico (5–0)	Iowa State (4–0)	Villanova (6–1)	Villanova (7–1)	Villanova (9–1)	North Carolina (9–2)	Maryland (14–1)	Iowa State (11–3)	Iowa State (13–3)	Arizona (13–5) т	New Mexico (18–4)	Arizona (16–6)	Iowa State (18–6)	New Mexico (22–6)	Clemson (21–9)	Stanford (22–8)	12.
13.	UMass	Texas (1–0)	Arizona (2–1)	Texas (4–0)	North Carolina (6–1)	Arizona (5–2)	Arizona (6–2)	Xavier (10–0)	Duke (11–4)	Villanova (14–3)	Villanova (15–4)	Iowa State (15–3)	South Carolina (17–5)	Maryland (19–6)	Arizona (17–7)	Clemson (21–8)	Arizona (19–9)	Iowa State (22–9)	13.
14.	Stanford	Stanford (0–0)	North Carolina (2–1)	Duke (5–2)	Texas (5–1)	New Mexico (8–1)	New Mexico (11–1)	Michigan (10–3)	New Mexico (13–2)	New Mexico (14–3)	New Mexico (15–3)	Villanova (16–5)	Michigan (17–6)	North Carolina (17–6)	UCLA (17–7)	Xavier (22–4)	Xavier (22–5)	South Carolina (24–8)	14.
15.	Texas	Iowa State (0–0)	Iowa State (3–0)	New Mexico (6–1)	New Mexico (7–1)	Louisville (8–0)	Louisville (10–0)	Indiana (14–2)	Villanova (12–3)	Xavier (12–2)	Stanford (13–3)	Michigan (16–5)	Louisville (18–5)	Louisville (19–5)	Louisville (21–6)	Iowa State (19–7)	Saint Joseph's (24–6)	Providence (24–12)	15.
16.	Arizona	UMass (0–0)	Fresno State (4–0)	Fresno State (5–1)	Minnesota (6–1)	Texas (6–2)	Minnesota (10–1)	Louisville (11–1)	Indiana (14–3)	Michigan (13–4)	Michigan (14–5)	Stanford (13–4)	Colorado (17–6)	Michigan (17–7)	Maryland (20–7)	Colorado (21–8)	Villanova (23–9)	Cincinnati (26–8)	16.
17.	Clemson	Indiana (3–0)	UCLA (0–1)	Minnesota (5–1)	Fresno State (6–2)	Minnesota (8–1)	Texas (6–2)	Maryland (12–1)	Stanford (10–2)	Stanford (11–3)	Indiana (17–4)	Xavier (15–3)	North Carolina (15–6)	Xavier (18–4)	Xavier (20–4)	Villanova (21–8)	Iowa State (20–8)	Saint Joseph's (26–7)	17.
18.	Arkansas	UCLA (0–1)	Syracuse (3–1)	Stanford (3–1)	Louisville (6–0)	Xavier (8–0)	Maryland (11–0)	New Mexico (11–2)	Michigan (11–4)	North Carolina (11–4)	North Carolina (12–5)	North Carolina (13–6)	Villanova (17–6)	Villanova (18–7)	Villanova (20–7)	College of Charleston (28–2)	College of Charleston (28–2)	California (25–9)	18.
19.	Fresno State	Fresno State (1–0)	Tulsa (2–1)	Texas Tech (5–0)	Xavier (7–0)	Alabama (10–0)	Xavier (9–0)	Texas (7–3)	Boston College (10–2)	Indiana (15–4)	Xavier (13–3)	Colorado (16–4)	Xavier (16–4)	UCLA (15–7)	Colorado (19–7)	Louisville (22–7)	Maryland (21–10)	New Mexico (25–8)	19.
20.	Iowa	Arkansas (1–0)	Minnesota (5–0)	Arkansas (3–1)	Stanford (4–1)	Stanford (6–1)	Stanford (7–1)	Oregon (10–0)	Texas (8–4)	Texas Tech (12–3)	Colorado (15–4)	South Carolina (15–5)	Texas Tech (14–6)	Colorado (17–7)	College of Charleston (25–2)	Maryland (20–9)	Boston College (21–8)	Texas (18–12)	20.
21.	Boston College	Tulsa (2–0)	Stanford (2–1)	Xavier (5–0)	Arkansas (4–1)	Maryland (8–0)	Texas Tech (8–2)	Texas Tech (9–2)	North Carolina (9–4)	Texas (9–5)	Texas (11–5)	Texas Tech (13–5)	Illinois (17–6)	Illinois (18–7)	Michigan (17–9)	Illinois (20–8)	Stanford (20–7)	College of Charleston (29–3)	21.
22.	New Mexico	New Mexico (3–0)	Boston College (2–0)	Louisville (4–0)	Alabama (8–0)	Texas Tech (7–1)	Oregon (9–0)	Stanford (8–2)	Oregon (10–2)	Colorado (14–3)	Texas Tech (13–4)	Tulsa (17–5)	Stanford (13–6)	Stanford (15–6)	Indiana (21–8)	Stanford (18–7)	Georgia (24–8)	Xavier (23–6)	22.
23.	Tulane	Iowa (1–0)	Arkansas (2–1)	Boston College (3–1)	Texas Tech (5–1)	Fresno State (7–0)	Alabama (10–2)	Boston College (8–2)	Texas Tech (10–3)	Boston College (12–3)	Marquette (13–3)	Indiana (17–6)	Tulane (16–7)	Texas Tech (15–7)	Illinois (18–8)	Saint Joseph's (21–6)	Colorado (21–9)	Boston College (22–9)	23.
24.	Indiana	Boston College (1–0)	Georgetown (3–0)	Georgetown (5–1)	Boston College (4–1)	Arkansas (5–2)	Arkansas (6–2)	Illinois (10–2)	Georgia (12–2)	Iowa (14–4)	Tulsa (15–4)	Tulane (16–5)	Tulsa (17–6)	College of Charleston (23–2)	Stanford (16–7)	Indiana (21–9)	Illinois (21–9)	Michigan (23–11)	24.
25.	Louisville	George Washington (2–0)	Texas Tech (3–0)	George Washington (5–1)	Maryland (7–0)	Boston College (5–1)	Boston College (6–2)	Georgia (11–2)	Ole Miss (11–3)	Illinois (13–4)	Boston College (13–4)	Illinois (15–6)	UCLA (13–7)	Indiana (20–7)	California (19–7)	Princeton (22–3)	Louisville (23–8)	Colorado (22–10)	25.
	Preseason	Week 2 Nov. 26	Week 3 Dec. 3	Week 4 Dec. 10	Week 5 Dec. 17	Week 6 Dec. 24	Week 7 Dec. 31	Week 8 Jan. 7	Week 9 Jan. 14	Week 10 Jan. 21	Week 11 Jan. 28	Week 12 Feb. 4	Week 13 Feb. 11	Week 14 Feb. 18	Week 15 Feb. 25	Week 16 Mar. 4	Week 17 Mar. 11	Final Apr. 1	
		Dropped: Tulane; Louisville	Dropped: UMass; Iowa; George Washington	Dropped: UCLA; Syracuse; Tulsa	Dropped: Georgetown; George Washington	None	Dropped: Fresno State	Dropped: Alabama; Arkansas	Dropped: Illinois	Dropped: Oregon; Georgia; Ole Miss	Dropped: Iowa; Illinois	Dropped: Texas; Marquette; Boston College	Dropped: Indiana	Dropped: Tulane; Tulsa	Dropped: Texas Tech	Dropped: Michigan; California	Dropped: Indiana (22–10); Princeton	Dropped: Georgia (24–9); Illinois (22–10); Villanova (24–10); Maryland (21–11)	
