= 1996–97 Georgia Bulldogs basketball team =

American college basketball season

1996–97 Georgia Bulldogs basketball

Rainbow Classic champion

NCAA tournament, Second round
- Conference: Southeastern Conference
- East

Ranking
- AP: No. 17
- Record: 24–9 (10–6 SEC)
- Head coach: Tubby Smith (2nd season)
- Assistant coach: 2nd
- Home arena: Stegeman Coliseum

1996–97 Southeastern Conference men's basketball standings
	Conf.				Overall
Team	W		L	PCT	W		L	PCT
East
No. 6 South Carolina	15	–	1	.938	24	–	8	.750
No. 5 Kentucky†	13	–	3	.813	35	–	5	.875
No. 17 Georgia	10	–	6	.625	24	–	9	.727
Vanderbilt	9	–	7	.563	19	–	12	.613
Florida	5	–	11	.313	13	–	17	.433
Tennessee	4	–	12	.250	11	–	16	.407
West
Ole Miss	11	–	5	.688	20	–	9	.690
Arkansas	8	–	8	.500	18	–	14	.563
Auburn	6	–	10	.375	16	–	15	.516
Alabama	6	–	10	.375	17	–	14	.548
Mississippi State	6	–	10	.375	12	–	18	.400
LSU	3	–	13	.188	10	–	20	.333
† 1997 SEC tournament winner Rankings from AP Poll

The 1996–97 Georgia Bulldogs basketball team represented the University of Georgia as a member of the Southeastern Conference during the 1996–97 NCAA men's basketball season. The team was led by head coach Tubby Smith, and played their home games at Stegeman Coliseum in Athens, Georgia. The Bulldogs finished 3rd in the SEC East during the regular season, had a strong showing at the SEC tournament, and received an at-large bid to the NCAA tournament as No. 3 seed in the Southeast region. They were upset by No. 14 seed Chattanooga in the opening round and finished the season at 24–9 (10–6 SEC).

== Roster ==
1996–97 Georgia Bulldogs men's basketball team
Players	Coaches
Pos. / # / Name / Height / Weight / Year / Hometown; F / 24 / Michael Chadwick / 6 ft 4 in (1.93 m) / — / So	Head coach: Tubby Smith; Assistant coach(es) Legend: (C) Team captain; (S) Suspended; (I) Ineligible; (W) Walk-on; Injured; Current redshirt

== Schedule and results ==
Date time, TV	Rank^{#}	Opponent^{#}	Result	Record	Site city, state
Non-conference Regular season
Nov 22, 1996*		Furman	W 91–67	1–0	Stegeman Coliseum; Athens, Georgia
Nov 26, 1996*		Georgia State	W 85–47	2–0	Stegeman Coliseum; Athens, Georgia
Nov 29, 1996*		Georgia Southern	W 90–56	3–0	Stegeman Coliseum; Athens, Georgia
Dec 3, 1996*		at Georgia Tech	L 61–62	3–1	Alexander Memorial Coliseum; Atlanta, Georgia
Dec 7, 1996*		Appalachian State	W 85–67	4–1	Stegeman Coliseum; Athens, Georgia
Dec 14, 1996*		at Virginia Tech	W 60–57	5–1	Cassell Coliseum; Blacksburg, Virginia
Dec 17, 1996*		East Carolina	W 73–60	6–1	Stegeman Coliseum; Athens, Georgia
Dec 21, 1996*		vs. BYU	W 84–65	7–1	Georgia Dome; Atlanta, Georgia
Dec 23, 1996*		Colorado	W 62–52	8–1	Stegeman Coliseum; Athens, Georgia
Dec 27, 1996*		vs. Washington State; Rainbow Classic	W 64–61	9–1	Stan Sheriff Center; Honolulu, Hawaii
Dec 28, 1996*		vs. Memphis; Rainbow Classic	W 70–68	10–1	Stan Sheriff Center; Honolulu, Hawaii
Dec 29, 1996*		vs. No. 21 Maryland; Rainbow Classic	W 73–65 ^{OT}	11–1	Stan Sheriff Center; Honolulu, Hawaii
SEC Regular season
Jan 5, 1997		at Ole Miss	L 66–73	11–2 (0–1)	Tad Smith Coliseum; Oxford, Mississippi
Jan 8, 1997	No. 24	at Vanderbilt	W 61–53	12–2 (1–1)	Memorial Gymnasium; Nashville, Tennessee
Jan 14, 1997	No. 21	No. 5 Kentucky	L 65–86	12–3 (1–2)	Stegeman Coliseum; Athens, Georgia
Jan 18, 1997	No. 21	at South Carolina	L 71–82	12–4 (1–3)	Carolina Coliseum; Columbia, South Carolina
Jan 22, 1997*		Florida	W 77–70 ^{OT}	13–4 (2–3)	Stegeman Coliseum; Athens, Georgia
Jan 25, 1997		Auburn	W 53–48	14–4 (3–3)	Stegeman Coliseum; Athens, Georgia
Jan 29, 1997		at Tennessee	W 63–50	15–4 (4–3)	Thompson-Boling Arena; Knoxville, Tennessee
Feb 1, 1997		at No. 3 Kentucky	L 57–82	15–5 (4–4)	Rupp Arena; Lexington, Kentucky
Feb 5, 1997		at Alabama	W 83–74	16–5 (5–4)	Coleman Coliseum; Tuscaloosa, Alabama
Feb 8, 1997		Mississippi State	W 56–54	17–5 (6–4)	Stegeman Coliseum; Athens, Georgia
Feb 12, 1997		No. 12 South Carolina	W 77–74	18–5 (7–4)	Stegeman Coliseum; Athens, Georgia
Feb 15, 1997		at Arkansas	L 74–79	18–6 (7–5)	Bud Walton Arena; Fayetteville, Arkansas
Feb 19, 1997		Vanderbilt	L 80–86	18–7 (7–6)	Stegeman Coliseum; Athens, Georgia
Feb 22, 1997		LSU	W 82–59	19–7 (8–6)	Stegeman Coliseum; Athens, Georgia
Feb 26, 1997		at Florida	W 88–76	20–7 (9–6)	Stephen C. O'Connell Center; Gainesville, Florida
Mar 1, 1997		Tennessee	W 69–55	21–7 (10–6)	Stegeman Coliseum; Athens, Georgia
SEC Tournament
Mar 6, 1997*	(E3) No. 24	vs. (W6) LSU; First round	W 75–54	22–7	The Pyramid; Memphis, Tennessee
Mar 7, 1997*	(E3) No. 24	vs. (W2) Arkansas; Quarterfinals	W 65–63	23–7	The Pyramid; Memphis, Tennessee
Mar 8, 1997*	(E3) No. 24	vs. (E1) No. 4 South Carolina; Semifinals	W 78–63	24–7	The Pyramid; Memphis, Tennessee
Mar 9, 1997*	(E3) No. 24	vs. (E2) No. 6 Kentucky; Championship game	L 68–95	24–8	The Pyramid; Memphis, Tennessee
NCAA Tournament
Mar 14, 1997*; CBS	(3 SE) No. 17	vs. (14 SE) Chattanooga; First round	L 70–73	24–9	Charlotte Coliseum; Charlotte, North Carolina
*Non-conference game. ^{#}Rankings from AP poll. (#) Tournament seedings in parentheses. SE=Southeast. All times are in Eastern Time.
