= 1996–97 Vanderbilt Commodores men's basketball team =

American college basketball season

1996–97 Vanderbilt Commodores men's basketball

NCAA tournament, First Round
- Conference: Southeastern Conference
- Record: 19–12 (9–7 SEC)
- Head coach: Jan van Breda Kolff (4th season)
- Home arena: Memorial Gymnasium

1996–97 Southeastern Conference men's basketball standings
	Conf.				Overall
Team	W		L	PCT	W		L	PCT
East
No. 6 South Carolina	15	–	1	.938	24	–	8	.750
No. 5 Kentucky†	13	–	3	.813	35	–	5	.875
No. 17 Georgia	10	–	6	.625	24	–	9	.727
Vanderbilt	9	–	7	.563	19	–	12	.613
Florida	5	–	11	.313	13	–	17	.433
Tennessee	4	–	12	.250	11	–	16	.407
West
Ole Miss	11	–	5	.688	20	–	9	.690
Arkansas	8	–	8	.500	18	–	14	.563
Auburn	6	–	10	.375	16	–	15	.516
Alabama	6	–	10	.375	17	–	14	.548
Mississippi State	6	–	10	.375	12	–	18	.400
LSU	3	–	13	.188	10	–	20	.333
† 1997 SEC tournament winner Rankings from AP Poll

The 1996–97 Vanderbilt Commodores men's basketball team represented Vanderbilt University as a member of the Southeastern Conference during the 1996–97 college basketball season. The team was led by head coach Jan van Breda Kolff and played its home games at Memorial Gymnasium.

The Commodores finished 4th in the SEC East regular season standings and received an at-large bid to the NCAA tournament as No. 10 seed in the Midwest region. The team finished with a 19–12 record (9–7 SEC).

== Roster ==
1996–97 Vanderbilt Commodores men's basketball team
Players	Coaches
Pos. / # / Name / Height / Weight / Year / Hometown; F/C / 42 / Dan Langhi / 6 ft 11 in (2.11 m) / 210 lb (95 kg) / Fr / Benton, Kentucky	Head coach: Jan van Breda Kolff (Vanderbilt); Assistant coach(es) Legend: (C) Team captain; (S) Suspended; (I) Ineligible; (W) Walk-on; Injured; Current redshirt

== Schedule and results ==
Date time, TV	Rank^{#}	Opponent^{#}	Result	Record	Site (attendance) city, state
Regular season
Nov 20, 1996*		Valparaiso; Preseason NIT	W 74–66	1–0	Memorial Gymnasium; Nashville, Tennessee
Nov 22, 1996*		at No. 10 Duke; Preseason NIT	L 57–86	1–1	Cameron Indoor Stadium; Durham, North Carolina
Dec 4, 1996*		UAB	W 66–62	2–1	Memorial Gymnasium; Nashville, Tennessee
Dec 7, 1996*		at Memphis	W 66–59	3–1	The Pyramid; Memphis, Tennessee
Dec 9, 1996*		at No. 25 Boston College	L 52–59	3–2	Silvio O. Conte Forum; Boston, Massachusetts
Dec 15, 1996*		Nicholls State	W 85–37	4–2	Memorial Gymnasium; Nashville, Tennessee
Dec 19, 1996*		Alabama-Huntsville	W 60–47	5–2	Memorial Gymnasium; Nashville, Tennessee
Dec 21, 1996*		Tennessee Tech	W 82–61	6–2	Memorial Gymnasium; Nashville, Tennessee
Dec 23, 1996*		Mississippi Valley State	W 92–56	7–2	Memorial Gymnasium; Nashville, Tennessee
Dec 29, 1996*		at Evansville	L 61–66	7–3	Roberts Stadium; Evansville, Indiana
Dec 31, 1996*		Saint Louis	W 81–61	8–3	Memorial Gymnasium; Nashville, Tennessee
Jan 4, 1997		Alabama	W 92–84	9–3 (1–0)	Memorial Gymnasium; Nashville, Tennessee
Jan 8, 1997		No. 24 Georgia	L 53–61	9–4 (1–1)	Memorial Gymnasium; Nashville, Tennessee
Jan 11, 1997		at Tennessee	L 65–75	9–5 (1–2)	Thompson-Boling Arena; Knoxville, Tennessee
Jan 15, 1997		at LSU	W 69–62	10–5 (2–2)	LSU Assembly Center; Baton Rouge, Louisiana
Jan 18, 1997		No. 20 Ole Miss	W 67–64	11–5 (3–2)	Memorial Gymnasium; Nashville, Tennessee
Jan 22, 1997		vs. No. 3 Kentucky	L 46–58	11–6 (3–3)	Riverfront Coliseum; Cincinnati, Ohio
Jan 25, 1997		at Mississippi State	L 53–60	11–7 (3–4)	Humphrey Coliseum; Starkville, Mississippi
Jan 29, 1997		No. 25 South Carolina	L 64–65	11–8 (3–5)	Memorial Gymnasium; Nashville, Tennessee
Feb 1, 1997		at Florida	W 74–63	12–8 (4–5)	Stephen C. O'Connell Center; Gainesville, Florida
Feb 5, 1997*		Memphis	W 69–62	13–8	Memorial Gymnasium; Nashville, Tennessee
Feb 8, 1997		Arkansas	W 87–83 ^{OT}	14–8 (5–5)	Memorial Gymnasium; Nashville, Tennessee
Feb 12, 1997		Tennessee	W 66–53	15–8 (6–5)	Memorial Gymnasium; Nashville, Tennessee
Feb 15, 1997		at Auburn	W 75–61	16–8 (7–5)	Beard-Eaves-Memorial Coliseum; Auburn, Alabama
Feb 19, 1997		at Georgia	W 86–80	17–8 (8–5)	Stegeman Coliseum; Athens, Georgia
Feb 22, 1997		No. 3 Kentucky	L 79–82	17–9 (8–6)	Memorial Gymnasium; Nashville, Tennessee
Feb 26, 1997		at No. 6 South Carolina	L 53–74	17–10 (8–7)	Carolina Coliseum; Columbia, South Carolina
Mar 1, 1997		Florida	W 79–72	18–10 (9–7)	Memorial Gymnasium; Nashville, Tennessee
SEC tournament
Mar 6, 1997*		vs. Mississippi State	W 73–67 ^{OT}	19–10	The Pyramid; Memphis, Tennessee
Mar 7, 1997*		vs. Ole Miss	L 62–64	19–11	The Pyramid; Memphis, Tennessee
NCAA tournament
Mar 13, 1997*	(10 MW)	vs. (7 MW) No. 13 Xavier; First round	L 68–80	19–12	Palace of Auburn Hills; Auburn Hills, Michigan
*Non-conference game. ^{#}Rankings from AP poll. (#) Tournament seedings in parentheses. MW=Midwest. All times are in Central Time.
