= 1996–97 South Carolina Gamecocks men's basketball team =

American college basketball season

1996–97 South Carolina Gamecocks men's basketball

SEC regular season champions

NCAA tournament, round of 64
- Conference: Southeastern Conference
- East

Ranking
- Coaches: No. 14
- AP: No. 6
- Record: 24–8 (15–1 SEC)
- Head coach: Eddie Fogler (4th season)
- Assistant coach: Barclay Radebaugh (3rd season)
- Home arena: Carolina Coliseum

1996–97 Southeastern Conference men's basketball standings
	Conf.				Overall
Team	W		L	PCT	W		L	PCT
East
No. 6 South Carolina	15	–	1	.938	24	–	8	.750
No. 5 Kentucky†	13	–	3	.813	35	–	5	.875
No. 17 Georgia	10	–	6	.625	24	–	9	.727
Vanderbilt	9	–	7	.563	19	–	12	.613
Florida	5	–	11	.313	13	–	17	.433
Tennessee	4	–	12	.250	11	–	16	.407
West
Ole Miss	11	–	5	.688	20	–	9	.690
Arkansas	8	–	8	.500	18	–	14	.563
Auburn	6	–	10	.375	16	–	15	.516
Alabama	6	–	10	.375	17	–	14	.548
Mississippi State	6	–	10	.375	12	–	18	.400
LSU	3	–	13	.188	10	–	20	.333
† 1997 SEC tournament winner Rankings from AP Poll

The 1996–97 South Carolina Gamecocks men's basketball team represented the University of South Carolina as a member of the Southeastern Conference during the 1996–97 men's college basketball season. The team was led by head coach Eddie Fogler and played their home games at Carolina Coliseum in Columbia, South Carolina. The team finished first in the SEC regular season standings and received an at-large bid to the 1997 NCAA tournament as No. 2 seed in the East region. The Gamecocks lost to 15 seed Coppin State in the first round to finish the season with a record of 24–8 (15–1 SEC).

== Roster ==
1996–97 South Carolina Gamecocks men's basketball team
Players	Coaches
Pos. / # / Name / Height / Weight / Year / Hometown; G / 10 / BJ McKie / 6 ft 2 in (1.88 m) / 185 lb (84 kg) / So / Irmo, South Carolina	Head coach: Eddie Fogler; Assistant coach(es): Barclay Radebaugh (East Tennessee State); Legend: (C) Team captain; (S) Suspended; (I) Ineligible; (W) Walk-on; Injured; Current redshirt; Roster

== Schedule and results ==
Date time, TV	Rank^{#}	Opponent^{#}	Result	Record	Site city, state
Regular season
Nov 25, 1996*		vs. Virginia; Maui Invitational	L 70–93	0–1	Lahaina Civic Center; Lahaina, Hawaii
Nov 26, 1996		at Chaminade; Maui Invitational	W 64–55	1–1	Lahaina Civic Center; Lahaina, Hawaii
Nov 27, 1996*		vs. LSU; Maui Invitational	W 74–68	2–1	Lahaina Civic Center; Lahaina, Hawaii
Dec 2, 1996*		Wofford	W 64–41	3–1	Carolina Coliseum; Columbia, South Carolina
Dec 6, 1996*		at UNC Charlotte	W 75–60	4–1	Charlotte Coliseum; Charlotte, North Carolina
Dec 7, 1996*		at No. 14 North Carolina	L 75–86	4–2	Charlotte Coliseum; Charlotte, North Carolina
Dec 17, 1996*		No. 8 Clemson	L 39–58	4–3	Carolina Coliseum; Columbia, South Carolina
Dec 19, 1996*		UNC Asheville	L 74–80	4–4	Carolina Coliseum; Columbia, South Carolina
Dec 21, 1996*		South Carolina State	W 79–60	5–4	Carolina Coliseum; Columbia, South Carolina
Dec 28, 1996*		Charleston Southern	L 81–85	5–5	Carolina Coliseum; Columbia, South Carolina
Dec 30, 1996*		Furman	W 100–62	6–5	Carolina Coliseum; Columbia, South Carolina
Jan 4, 1997*		Auburn	W 66–56	7–5 (1–0)	Carolina Coliseum; Columbia, South Carolina
Jan 8, 1997		Tennessee	W 73–41	8–5 (2–0)	Carolina Coliseum; Columbia, South Carolina
Jan 11, 1997		at Mississippi State	W 73–65	9–5 (3–0)	Humphrey Coliseum; Starkville, Mississippi
Jan 15, 1997		at Florida	W 80–79	10–5 (4–0)	Stephen C. O'Connell Center; Gainesville, Florida
Jan 18, 1997		No. 21 Georgia	W 82–71	11–5 (5–0)	Carolina Coliseum; Columbia, South Carolina
Jan 22, 1997		at Alabama	W 62–60	12–5 (6–0)	Coleman Coliseum; Tuscaloosa, Alabama
Jan 25, 1997; 1:00 p.m., JP Sports		Ole Miss	W 86–63	13–5 (7–0)	Carolina Coliseum; Columbia, South Carolina
Jan 29, 1997	No. 25	at Vanderbilt	W 65–64	14–5 (8–0)	Memorial Gymnasium; Nashville, Tennessee
Feb 1, 1997	No. 25	at LSU	W 80–65	15–5 (9–0)	Maravich Assembly Center; Baton Rouge, Louisiana
Feb 4, 1997	No. 19	No. 3 Kentucky	W 84–79 ^{OT}	16–5 (10–0)	Carolina Coliseum; Columbia, South Carolina
Feb 8, 1997	No. 19	Florida	W 76–68	17–5 (11–0)	Carolina Coliseum; Columbia, South Carolina
Feb 12, 1997	No. 12	at Georgia	L 74–77	17–6 (11–1)	Stegeman Coliseum; Athens, Georgia
Feb 15, 1997*	No. 12	at No. 8 Cincinnati	W 97–83	18–6	Fifth Third Arena; Cincinnati, Ohio
Feb 18, 1997	No. 9	Arkansas	W 78–65	19–6 (12–1)	Carolina Coliseum; Columbia, South Carolina
Feb 20, 1997*	No. 9	at The Citadel	W 85–55	20–6	McAlister Field House; Charleston, South Carolina
Feb 22, 1997	No. 9	at Tennessee	W 69–58	21–6 (13–1)	Thompson-Boling Arena; Knoxville, Tennessee
Feb 26, 1997	No. 6	Vanderbilt	W 74–53	22–6 (14–1)	Carolina Coliseum; Columbia, South Carolina
Mar 2, 1997	No. 6	at No. 3 Kentucky	W 72–66	23–6 (15–1)	Rupp Arena; Lexington, Kentucky
SEC Tournament
Mar 7, 1997*; JP Sports	(E1) No. 4	vs. (W4) Alabama; Quarterfinals	W 72–61	24–6	Memphis Pyramid; Memphis, Tennessee
Mar 8, 1997*; JP Sports	(E1) No. 4	vs. (E3) No. 24 Georgia; Semifinals	L 63–78	24–7	Memphis Pyramid; Memphis, Tennessee
NCAA Tournament
Mar 14, 1997*; CBS	(2 E) No. 6	vs. (15 E) Coppin State; First round	L 65–78	24–8	Civic Arena; Pittsburgh, Pennsylvania
*Non-conference game. ^{#}Rankings from AP Poll. (#) Tournament seedings in parentheses. E=East. All times are in Eastern Time.
