= List of most watched United States television broadcasts of 1997 =

The following is a list of most watched United States television broadcasts of 1997.

== Most watched by week ==
Broadcast (primetime only)
Week of	Title	Network	Viewers (in millions)	Ref.
January 6	Seinfeld	NBC	34.5	
January 13	Seinfeld	NBC	37.3	
January 20	Super Bowl XXXI	Fox	87.9	
January 27	ER	NBC	33.6	
February 3	Seinfeld	NBC	33.6	
February 10	ER	NBC	35.9	
February 17	Seinfeld	NBC	33.8	
February 24	Seinfeld	NBC	28.4	
March 3	Unknown			
March 10	Seinfeld	NBC	31.3	
March 17	Seinfeld	NBC	26.8	
March 24	69th Academy Awards	ABC	40.1	
March 31	NCAA Championship	CBS	28.4	
April 7	Unknown			
April 14	ER	NBC	32.1	
April 21	ER	NBC	33.6	
April 28	Ellen	ABC	36.2	
May 5	ER	NBC	34.8	
May 12	ER	NBC	34.9	
May 19	The Odyssey, Part 2	NBC	26.3	
May 26	NBA Finals (Game 1)	NBC	24.7	
June 2	NBA Finals (Game 4)	NBC	26.4	
June 9	NBA Finals (Game 5)	NBC	30.3	
June 16	Seinfeld	NBC	19.5	
June 23	Seinfeld	NBC	20.1	
June 30	60 Minutes	CBS	14.8	
July 7	Seinfeld	NBC	17.0	
July 14	Seinfeld	NBC	16.4	
July 21	Seinfeld	NBC	19.1	
July 28	Seinfeld	NBC	17.2	
August 4	Seinfeld	NBC	18.5	
August 11	Seinfeld	NBC	17.9	
August 18	Seinfeld	NBC	19.2	
August 25	Seinfeld	NBC	19.7	
September 1	Monday Night Football	ABC	21.6	
September 8	Seinfeld	NBC	22.6	
September 15	Monday Night Football	ABC	23.4	
1997–98 television season begins
September 22	ER	NBC	42.7	
September 29	ER	NBC	32.6	
October 6	ER	NBC	32.1	
October 13	ER	NBC	32.8	
October 20	World Series (Game 7)	NBC	38.0	
October 27	Cinderella	ABC	34.3	
November 3	ER	NBC	32.0	
November 10	ER	NBC	34.7	
November 17	What the Deaf Man Heard	CBS	36.9	
November 24	CBS Sunday Movie	CBS	27.6	
December 1	Touched by an Angel	CBS	24.4	
December 8	ER	NBC	31.7	
December 15	ER	NBC	32.5	
December 22	Monday Night Football	ABC	22.0	
December 28	Rose Bowl post-game show	ABC	27.8	
