= Edgerson =

Edgerson is a surname. Notable people with the surname include:

- Booker Edgerson (born 1939), American football player
- Eugene Edgerson (born 1978), American basketball player
