= 1996–97 Arkansas Razorbacks men's basketball team =

American college basketball season

1996–97 Arkansas Razorbacks men's basketball

NIT 4th Place
- Conference: Southeastern Conference
- West
- Record: 18–14 (8–8 SEC)
- Head coach: Nolan Richardson (12th season)
- Home arena: Bud Walton Arena

1996–97 Southeastern Conference men's basketball standings
	Conf.				Overall
Team	W		L	PCT	W		L	PCT
East
No. 6 South Carolina	15	–	1	.938	24	–	8	.750
No. 5 Kentucky†	13	–	3	.813	35	–	5	.875
No. 17 Georgia	10	–	6	.625	24	–	9	.727
Vanderbilt	9	–	7	.563	19	–	12	.613
Florida	5	–	11	.313	13	–	17	.433
Tennessee	4	–	12	.250	11	–	16	.407
West
Ole Miss	11	–	5	.688	20	–	9	.690
Arkansas	8	–	8	.500	18	–	14	.563
Auburn	6	–	10	.375	16	–	15	.516
Alabama	6	–	10	.375	17	–	14	.548
Mississippi State	6	–	10	.375	12	–	18	.400
LSU	3	–	13	.188	10	–	20	.333
† 1997 SEC tournament winner Rankings from AP Poll

The 1996–97 Arkansas Razorbacks men's basketball team represented the University of Arkansas in the 1996–97 college basketball season. The head coach was Nolan Richardson, serving for his 12th year. The team played its home games in Bud Walton Arena in Fayetteville, Arkansas.

== Roster ==
1996–97 Arkansas Razorbacks men's basketball team
Players	Coaches
Pos. / # / Name / Height / Weight / Year / Previous school / Hometown	Head coach: Nolan Richardson; Assistant coach(es) Legend: (C) Team captain; (S) Suspended; (I) Ineligible; (W) Walk-on; Injured; Current redshirt

== Schedule and results ==
Date time, TV	Rank^{#}	Opponent^{#}	Result	Record	Site city, state
Exhibition
Nov 12, 1996*		Converse All-Stars	W 101–94		Bud Walton Arena; Fayetteville, Arkansas
Nov 17, 1996*		North Melbourne	W 106–77		Bud Walton Arena; Fayetteville, Arkansas
Regular Season
SEC tournament
Mar 7, 1997*	(W2)	vs. (E3) No. 24 Georgia; Quarterfinals	L 63–65	14–13	Pyramid Arena; Memphis, Tennessee
NIT
Mar 12, 1997*		Northern Arizona; First Round	W 101–75	15–13	Bud Walton Arena; Fayetteville, Arkansas
Mar 17, 1997*		Pittsburgh; Second Round	W 76–71	16–13	Bud Walton Arena; Fayetteville, Arkansas
Mar 19, 1997*; ESPN		UNLV; Quarterfinals	W 86–73	17–13	Bud Walton Arena; Fayetteville, Arkansas
Mar 25, 1997*; ESPN		vs. Michigan; Semifinals	L 62–77	18–13	Madison Square Garden; New York, New York
Mar 27, 1997*		vs. Connecticut; Third-place game	L 64–74	18–14	Madison Square Garden (15,849); New York, New York
*Non-conference game. ^{#}Rankings from AP Poll. (#) Tournament seedings in parentheses. All times are in Central Time.
