= 1996–97 Ole Miss Rebels men's basketball team =

American college basketball season

1996–97 Ole Miss Rebels men's basketball

SEC West Division champions

NCAA tournament, first round
- Conference: Southeastern Conference
- Record: 20–9 (11–5 SEC)
- Head coach: Rob Evans (5th season)
- Home arena: Tad Smith Coliseum

1996–97 Southeastern Conference men's basketball standings
	Conf.				Overall
Team	W		L	PCT	W		L	PCT
East
No. 6 South Carolina	15	–	1	.938	24	–	8	.750
No. 5 Kentucky†	13	–	3	.813	35	–	5	.875
No. 17 Georgia	10	–	6	.625	24	–	9	.727
Vanderbilt	9	–	7	.563	19	–	12	.613
Florida	5	–	11	.313	13	–	17	.433
Tennessee	4	–	12	.250	11	–	16	.407
West
Ole Miss	11	–	5	.688	20	–	9	.690
Arkansas	8	–	8	.500	18	–	14	.563
Auburn	6	–	10	.375	16	–	15	.516
Alabama	6	–	10	.375	17	–	14	.548
Mississippi State	6	–	10	.375	12	–	18	.400
LSU	3	–	13	.188	10	–	20	.333
† 1997 SEC tournament winner Rankings from AP Poll

The 1996–97 Ole Miss Rebels men's basketball team represented the University of Mississippi in the 1996–97 NCAA Division I men's basketball season. The Rebels were led by fifth-year head coach, Rob Evans. The Rebels played their home games at Tad Smith Coliseum in Oxford, Mississippi as members of the Southeastern Conference. This season marked the second NCAA Tournament appearance in school history.

== Schedule and results ==
Date time, TV	Rank^{#}	Opponent^{#}	Result	Record	Site city, state
Non-conference regular season
November 24, 1996*		Portland State	W 56–54	1–0	Tad Smith Coliseum; Oxford, MS
November 26, 1996*		Prairie View A&M	W 71–42	2–0	Tad Smith Coliseum; Oxford, MS
December 2, 1996*		at Davidson	L 56–59	2–1	John M. Belk Arena; Davidson, NC
December 7, 1996*		Houston	W 93–71	3–1	Tad Smith Coliseum; Oxford, MS
December 14, 1996*		Wichita State	W 68–65	4–1	Tad Smith Coliseum; Oxford, MS
December 17, 1996*		Stetson	W 78–50	5–1	Tad Smith Coliseum; Oxford, MS
December 20, 1996*		Florida International	W 74–64	6–1	Tad Smith Coliseum; Oxford, MS
December 27, 1996*		vs. Appalachian State	W 75–63	7–1	The Pit; Albuquerque, NM
December 28, 1996*		at No. 14 New Mexico	L 64–75	7–2	The Pit; Albuquerque, NM
December 31, 1996*		Morgan State	W 91–57	8–2	Tad Smith Coliseum; Oxford, MS
SEC regular season
January 2, 1997		at No. 22 Arkansas	W 91–74	9–2 (1–0)	Bud Walton Arena; Fayetteville, AR
January 5, 1997		Georgia	W 73–66	10–2 (2–0)	Tad Smith Coliseum; Oxford, MS
January 8, 1997		Alabama	L 46–59	10–3 (2–1)	Tad Smith Coliseum; Oxford, MS
January 11, 1997		No. 3 Kentucky	W 73–69	11–3 (3–1)	Tad Smith Coliseum; Oxford, MS
January 15, 1997	No. 20	at Mississippi State	L 64–75	11–4 (3–2)	Humphrey Coliseum; Starkville, MS
January 18, 1997	No. 20	at Vanderbilt	L 64–67	11–5 (3–3)	Memorial Gymnasium; Nashville, TN
January 22, 1997		Tennessee	W 70–48	12–5 (4–3)	Tad Smith Coliseum; Oxford, MS
January 25, 1997; 12:00 p.m., JP Sports		at South Carolina	L 63–86	12–6 (4–4)	Carolina Coliseum; Columbia, SC
January 29, 1997		Arkansas	W 71–52	13–6 (5–4)	Tad Smith Coliseum; Oxford, MS
February 1, 1997		Auburn	W 57–46	14–6 (6–4)	Tad Smith Coliseum; Oxford, MS
February 5, 1997		at LSU	W 79–73	15–6 (7–4)	Pete Maravich Assembly Center; Baton Rouge, LA
February 12, 1997		at Alabama	L 54–57	15–7 (7–5)	Coleman Coliseum; Tuscaloosa, AL
February 19, 1997		Mississippi State	W 84–61	16–7 (8–5)	Tad Smith Coliseum; Oxford, MS
February 23, 1997		at Florida	W 67–65	17–7 (9–5)	O'Connell Center; Gainesville, FL
February 26, 1997		LSU	W 74–68	18–7 (10–5)	Tad Smith Coliseum; Oxford, MS
March 1, 1997		at Auburn	W 71–63	19–7 (11–5)	Beard–Eaves–Memorial Coliseum; Auburn, AL
SEC tournament
March 7, 1997; JP Sports	(1 W)	vs. (4 E) Vanderbilt; Quarterfinals	W 64–62	20–7	Pyramid Arena; Memphis, TN
March 8, 1997; JP Sports	(1 W)	vs. (2 E) No. 6 Kentucky; Semifinals	L 70–88	20–8	Pyramid Arena; Memphis, TN
NCAA tournament
March 14, 1997*; CBS	(8 MW)	vs. (9 MW) Temple; First round	L 40–62	20–9	Kemper Arena; Kansas City, MO
*Non-conference game. ^{#}Rankings from AP Poll. (#) Tournament seedings in parentheses. All times are in Central Time.
