= 1996–97 Kentucky Wildcats men's basketball team =

1996–97 season of University of Kentucky men's basketball team

1996–97 Kentucky Wildcats men's basketball
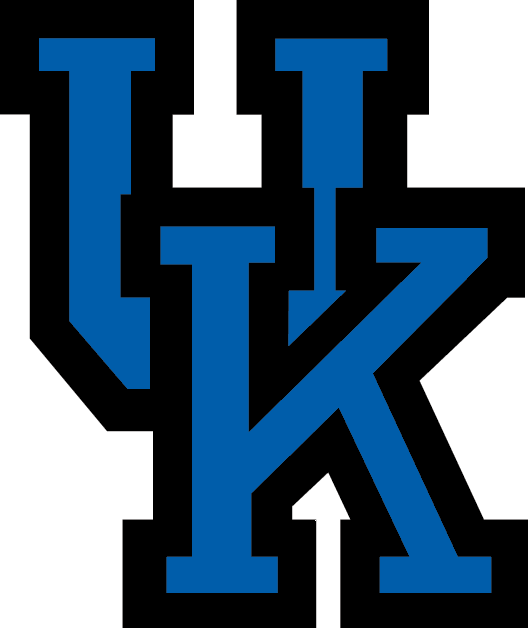

NCAA tournament, Runner-up SEC tournament champions

National Championship Game, L 79-84 ^{OT} vs. Arizona
- Conference: Southeast Conference

Ranking
- Coaches: No. 2
- AP: No. 5
- Record: 35–5 (13–3 SEC)
- Head coach: Rick Pitino (8th season)
- Assistant coaches: Jim O'Brien; Winston Bennett; Delray Brooks
- Home arena: Rupp Arena

1996–97 Southeastern Conference men's basketball standings
	Conf.				Overall
Team	W		L	PCT	W		L	PCT
East
No. 6 South Carolina	15	–	1	.938	24	–	8	.750
No. 5 Kentucky†	13	–	3	.813	35	–	5	.875
No. 17 Georgia	10	–	6	.625	24	–	9	.727
Vanderbilt	9	–	7	.563	19	–	12	.613
Florida	5	–	11	.313	13	–	17	.433
Tennessee	4	–	12	.250	11	–	16	.407
West
Ole Miss	11	–	5	.688	20	–	9	.690
Arkansas	8	–	8	.500	18	–	14	.563
Auburn	6	–	10	.375	16	–	15	.516
Alabama	6	–	10	.375	17	–	14	.548
Mississippi State	6	–	10	.375	12	–	18	.400
LSU	3	–	13	.188	10	–	20	.333
† 1997 SEC tournament winner Rankings from AP Poll

The 1996–97 Kentucky Wildcats men's basketball team represented University of Kentucky in the 1996–97 NCAA Division I men's basketball season. They were coached by Rick Pitino in his eighth, and final, season at Kentucky as members of the East division of the Southeast Conference. They played their home games at Rupp Arena in Lexington, Kentucky. They finished the season 35–5, 13–3 in SEC play to finish in second place in the East division. They defeated Auburn, Mississippi, and Georgia to win the SEC tournament. As a result, they received the conference's automatic bid to the NCAA tournament as the No. 1 seed in the West region. They defeated Montana, Iowa, Saint Joseph's and Utah to return to the Final Four for the second consecutive year. In the Final Four, they defeated Minnesota to advance to the National Championship game against Arizona. Looking to repeat as NCAA champions, the Wildcats lost in overtime to Arizona 84–79.

Following the season, head coach Rick Pitino left the school to take the head coaching job for the Boston Celtics.

== Previous season ==
The Wildcats finished the 1995–96 season 34–2, 16–0 in SEC play to win the SEC regular season championship. They defeated Florida and Arkansas in the SEC tournament before losing to Mississippi State in the championship game. They received an at-large bid to the NCAA tournament as the No. 1 seed in the Midwest region. There they defeated San Jose State, Virginia Tech, Utah, and Wake Forest to earn a trip to the Final Four. In the Final Four, they defeated UMass in the National semifinal game and Syracuse in the championship game to win the tournament championship.

== Roster ==
1996–97 Kentucky Wildcats men's basketball team
Players
Coaches

Pos.	#	Name	Height	Weight	Year	Hometown
G/F	3	Allen Edwards	6 ft 5 in (1.96 m)	—	Jr	Miami, FL
G	4	Steve Masiello	6 ft 2 in (1.88 m)	—	Fr	White Plains, NY
G	5	Wayne Turner	6 ft 2 in (1.88 m)	—	So	Boston, MA
C	13	Nazr Mohammed	6 ft 10 in (2.08 m)	—	So	Chicago, IL
G	21	Cameron Mills	6 ft 3 in (1.91 m)	—	Jr	Lexington, KY
G/F	23	Derek Anderson	6 ft 5 in (1.96 m)	—	Sr	Louisville, KY
G	25	Anthony Epps	6 ft 2 in (1.88 m)	—	Sr	Lebanon, KY
F	32	Jared Prickett	6 ft 9 in (2.06 m)	—	Sr	Fairmont, WV
G/F	33	Ron Mercer	6 ft 7 in (2.01 m)	—	So	Nashville, TN
F	34	Scott Padgett	6 ft 9 in (2.06 m)	—	So	Louisville, KY
C	42	Jamaal Magloire	6 ft 10 in (2.08 m)	—	Fr	Toronto

Head coach

- Rick Pitino

Assistant coach(es)

- Jim O'Brien
- Winston Bennett
- Delray Brooks

Legend

- (C) Team captain
- (S) Suspended
- (I) Ineligible
- (W) Walk-on
- Injured
- Current redshirt

== Schedule ==
Date time, TV	Rank^{#}	Opponent^{#}	Result	Record	Site (attendance) city, state
Exhibition
11/4/1996*		Athletes in Action	W 79–62		Rupp Arena; Lexington, KY
11/20/1996*		Australia	W 84–51		Rupp Arena; Lexington, KY
Regular season
11/15/1996*	No. 3	vs. No. 20 Clemson; BCA Classic	L 71–79 ^{OT}	0–1	RCA Dome (32,250); Indianapolis, IN
11/28/1996*	No. 8	vs. No. 12 Syracuse; Great Alaska Shootout	W 87–53	1–1	Sullivan Arena (8,285); Anchorage, AK
11/29/1996*	No. 8	vs. Alaska Anchorage; Great Alaska Shootout	W 104–72	2–1	Sullivan Arena (8,285); Anchorage, AK
11/30/1996*	No. 8	vs. College of Charleston; Great Alaska Shootout	W 92–65	3–1	Sullivan Arena (8,285); Anchorage, AK
12/3/1996*	No. 8	vs. Purdue; Great Eight	W 101–87	4–1	United Center (20,171); Chicago, IL
12/7/1996*	No. 6	vs. No. 8 Indiana	W 99–65	5–1	Freedom Hall (20,074); Louisville, KY
12/9/1996*	No. 6	Wright State	W 90–62	6–1	Rupp Arena (23,127); Lexington, KY
12/14/1996*	No. 3	Notre Dame	W 80–56	7–1	Rupp Arena (24,152); Lexington, KY
12/21/1996*	No. 3	vs. Georgia Tech; Delta Air Lines Classic	W 88–59	8–1	Georgia Dome (27,842); Atlanta, GA
12/23/1996*	No. 3	UNC Asheville	W 105–51	9–1	Rupp Arena (23,891); Lexington, KY
12/28/1996*	No. 3	vs. Ohio State; Rock and Roll Shootout	W 81–65	10–1	Gund Arena (20,562); Cleveland, OH
12/31/1996*	No. 3	at No. 16 Louisville	W 74–54	11–1	Freedom Hall (20,075); Louisville, KY
01/04/1997	No. 3	Tennessee	W 74–40	12–1 (1–0)	Rupp Arena (24,091); Lexington, KY
01/07/1997	No. 3	Mississippi State	W 90–61	13–1 (2–0)	Rupp Arena (24,038); Lexington, KY
01/09/1997*	No. 3	Canisius	W 68–45	14–1	Rupp Arena (22,883); Lexington, KY
01/11/1997	No. 3	Ole Miss	L 69–73	14–2 (2–1)	Tad Smith Coliseum (8,195); Oxford, MS
01/14/1997	No. 3	at No. 24 Georgia	W 86–65	15–2 (3–1)	Stegeman Coliseum (10,523); Athens, GA
01/18/1997	No. 5	Auburn	W 77–53	16–2 (4–1)	Rupp Arena (24,169); Lexington, KY
01/22/1997	No. 3	vs. Vanderbilt	W 58–46	17–2 (5–1)	Riverfront Coliseum (17,121); Cincinnati, OH
01/26/1997	No. 3	at Arkansas	W 83–73	18–2 (6–1)	Bud Walton Arena (20,320); Fayetteville, AR
01/29/1997	No. 3	at Florida	W 92–65	19–2 (7–1)	Stephen C. O'Connell Center (11,629); Gainesville, FL
02/01/1997	No. 3	Georgia	W 82–57	20–2 (8–1)	Rupp Arena (24,197); Lexington, KY
02/04/1997	No. 3	at No. 25 South Carolina	L 79–84 ^{OT}	20–3 (8–2)	Frank McGuire Arena (12,575); Columbia, SC
02/06/1997*	No. 3	Western Carolina	W 82–55	21–3	Rupp Arena (22,134); Lexington, KY
02/09/1997*	No. 3	No. 18 Villanova	W 93–56	22–3	Rupp Arena (24,277); Lexington, KY
02/12/1997	No. 4	LSU	W 84–48	23–3 (9–2)	Rupp Arena (23,981); Lexington, KY
02/15/1997	No. 4	Florida	W 85–56	24–3 (10–2)	Rupp Arena (24,191); Lexington, KY
02/19/1997	No. 3	Alabama	W 75–61	25–3 (11–2)	Coleman Coliseum (13,736); Tuscaloosa, AL
02/22/1997	No. 3	at Vanderbilt	W 82–79	26–3 (12–2)	Memorial Gymnasium (15,311); Nashville, TN
02/25/1997	No. 3	at Tennessee	W 74–64	27–3 (13–2)	Thompson-Boling Arena (20,241); Knoxville, TN
03/02/1997	No. 3	No. 6 South Carolina; Homecoming	L 66–72	27–4 (13–3)	Rupp Arena (24,326); Lexington, KY
SEC Tournament
03/07/1997; JPS	(E2) No. 6	vs. (W3) Auburn; Quarterfinals	W 92–50	28–4	The Pyramid (20,000); Memphis, TN
03/08/1997; JPS	(E2) No. 6	vs. (W1) Ole Miss; Semifinals	W 88–70	29–4	The Pyramid (20,000); Memphis, TN
03/09/1997; CBS	(E2) No. 6	vs. (E3) No. 24 Georgia; Championship	W 95–68	30–4	The Pyramid (19,423); Memphis, TN
NCAA tournament
03/13/1997*	(1 W) No. 5	vs. (16 W) Montana; First Round	W 92–54	31–4	Huntsman Center (13,832); Salt Lake City, UT
03/15/1997*	(1 W) No. 5	vs. (8 W) Iowa; Second Round	W 75–69	32–4	Huntsman Center (14,387); Salt Lake City, UT
03/20/1997*; CBS	(1 W) No. 5	vs. (4 W) No. 12 Saint Joseph's; Sweet Sixteen	W 83–68	33–4	San Jose Arena (18,543); San Jose, CA
03/22/1997*; CBS	(1 W) No. 5	vs. (2 W) No. 2 Utah; Elite Eight	W 72–59	34–4	San Jose Arena (18,543); San Jose, CA
03/29/1997*; CBS	(1 W) No. 5	vs. (1 MW) No. 3 Minnesota; Final Four	W 78–69	35–4	RCA Dome (47,028); Indianapolis, IN
03/31/1997*; CBS	(1 W) No. 5	vs. (4 SE) No. 15 Arizona; National Championship	L 79–84 ^{OT}	35–5	RCA Dome (47,028); Indianapolis, IN
*Non-conference game. ^{#}Rankings from AP Poll. (#) Tournament seedings in parentheses.

== Team players drafted into the NBA ==
Year	Round	Pick	Player	NBA club
1997	1	6	Ron Mercer	Boston Celtics
1997	1	13	Derek Anderson	Cleveland Cavaliers
1998	1	29	Nazr Mohammed	Utah Jazz
1999	1	28	Scott Padgett	Utah Jazz
2000	1	19	Jamaal Magloire	Charlotte Hornets
