= 1997 NCAA Division I men's basketball tournament =

Edition of USA college basketball tournament

- Season: 1996–97
- Teams: 64
- Finals site: RCA Dome, Indianapolis, Indiana
- Champions: Arizona Wildcats (1st title, 1st title game, 3rd Final Four)
- Runner-up: Kentucky Wildcats (9th title game, 12th Final Four)
- Semifinalists: Minnesota Golden Gophers (Vacated) (1st Final Four); North Carolina Tar Heels (13th Final Four)
- Winning coach: Lute Olson (1st title)
- MOP: Miles Simon (Arizona)
- Attendance: 646,531
- Top scorer: Miles Simon (Arizona) (132 points)

The 1997 NCAA Division I men's basketball tournament involved 64 schools playing in single-elimination play to determine the national champion of men's NCAA Division I college basketball. The 59th annual edition of the tournament began on March 13, 1997, and ended with the championship game on March 31 in Indianapolis, Indiana at the RCA Dome. A total of 63 games were played.

The Final Four consisted of Kentucky, who entered the tournament as the defending national champions, Minnesota, making their first Final Four appearance, Arizona, making their third Final Four appearance and first since 1994, and North Carolina, making their thirteenth Final Four appearance and first since 1995.

In the national championship game, Arizona defeated Kentucky in overtime 84–79 to win their first national championship. For the second time in the last three seasons, the defending national champions reached the final game and lost.

Miles Simon of Arizona was named the tournament's Most Outstanding Player.

Several years later, Minnesota was stripped of its Final Four appearance following the discovery of NCAA academic rule violations. In addition, the Gophers were stripped of their Big Ten title they had also won.

Arizona also became the only school since the introduction of the 64-team bracket in 1985, to defeat three number 1 seeds in the tournament, having upset overall number one seed Kansas in addition to their two Final Four victories.

The tournament also saw the third victory by a #15 seed over a #2 seed, as Coppin State defeated South Carolina in their first round matchup. In addition, a #14 seed advanced to the Sweet Sixteen for only the second time, as Southeast Region #14 seed Chattanooga defeated both Georgia and Illinois.

The tournament marked the end of the career of North Carolina coach Dean Smith. Smith, whose team lost in the national semifinals, retired just prior to the beginning of the 1997–98 season.

== Schedule and venues ==
1997 first and second rounds
1997 Regionals (blue) and Final Four (red)

The following are the sites that were selected to host each round of the 1997 tournament:

First and Second Rounds

- March 13 and 15
  - East Region
    - Lawrence Joel Veterans Memorial Coliseum, Winston-Salem, North Carolina (Host: Wake Forest University)
  - Midwest Region
    - The Palace of Auburn Hills, Auburn Hills, Michigan (Host: Mid-American Conference)
  - Southeast Region
    - Memphis Pyramid, Memphis, Tennessee (Host: University of Memphis)
  - West Region
    - Jon M. Huntsman Center, Salt Lake City, Utah (Host: University of Utah)
- March 14 and 16
  - East Region
    - Pittsburgh Civic Arena, Pittsburgh, Pennsylvania (Host: Duquesne University)
  - Midwest Region
    - Kemper Arena, Kansas City, Missouri (Host: University of Kansas)
  - Southeast Region
    - Charlotte Coliseum, Charlotte, North Carolina (Host: Davidson College)
  - West Region
    - McKale Center, Tucson, Arizona (Host: University of Arizona)

Regional semifinals and finals (Sweet Sixteen and Elite Eight)

- March 20 and 22
  - Midwest Regional, Alamodome, San Antonio, Texas (Host: University of Texas at San Antonio)
  - West Regional, San Jose Arena, San Jose, California (Host: San Jose State University)
- March 21 and 23
  - East Regional, Carrier Dome, Syracuse, New York (Host: Syracuse University)
  - Southeast Regional, BJCC Coliseum, Birmingham, Alabama (Host: Southeastern Conference)

National semifinals and championship (Final Four and championship)

- March 29 and 31
  - RCA Dome, Indianapolis, Indiana (Hosts: Butler University, Midwestern Collegiate Conference)

== Teams ==
There were 30 automatic bids awarded to the tournament - of these, 27 were given to the winners of their conference's tournament, while three were awarded to the team with the best regular-season record in their conference (Big Ten, Ivy League and Pac-10).

Two conference champions made their first NCAA tournament appearances: Charleston Southern (Big South) and Jackson State (SWAC).

=== Automatic qualifiers ===
Automatic qualifiers
Conference	Team	Appearance	Last bid
ACC	North Carolina	31st	1996
America East	Boston University	5th	1990
Atlantic 10	Saint Joseph's	15th	1986
Big 12	Kansas	26th	1996
Big East	Boston College	11th	1996
Big Sky	Montana	4th	1992
Big South	Charleston Southern	1st	Never
Big Ten	Minnesota (vacated)	–	1990
Big West	Pacific	5th	1979
CAA	Old Dominion	7th	1995
Conference USA	Marquette	21st	1996
Ivy League	Princeton	20th	1996
MAAC	Fairfield	3rd	1987
MAC	Miami (OH)	15th	1995
MCC	Butler	2nd	1962
MEAC	Coppin State	3rd	1993
Mid-Continent	Valparaiso	2nd	1996
Missouri Valley	Illinois State	5th	1990
NEC	Long Island	3rd	1984
Ohio Valley	Murray State	8th	1995
Pac-10	UCLA	32nd	1996
Patriot	Navy	10th	1994
SEC	Kentucky	38th	1996
Southern	Chattanooga	8th	1995
Southland	Southwest Texas State	2nd	1994
SWAC	Jackson State	1st	Never
Sun Belt	South Alabama	5th	1991
TAAC	College of Charleston	2nd	1994
WAC	Utah	19th	1996
West Coast	Saint Mary's	3rd	1989

=== Tournament seeds ===
East Regional – Carrier Dome, Syracuse, New York
Seed	School	Conference	Record	Berth type
1	North Carolina	ACC	24–6	Automatic
2	South Carolina	SEC	24–7	At-Large
3	New Mexico	WAC	24–7	At-Large
4	Villanova	Big East	23–9	At-Large
5	California	Pac-10	21–8	At-Large
6	Louisville	Conference USA	23–8	At-Large
7	Wisconsin	Big Ten	18–9	At-Large
8	Indiana	Big Ten	22–10	At-Large
9	Colorado	Big 12	21–9	At-Large
10	Texas	Big 12	16–11	At-Large
11	UMass	Atlantic 10	19–13	At-Large
12	Princeton	Ivy League	24–3	Automatic
13	Long Island	NEC	21–8	Automatic
14	Old Dominion	CAA	22–10	Automatic
15	Coppin State	MEAC	21–8	Automatic
16	Fairfield	MAAC	11–18	Automatic

Southeast Regional – BJCC Coliseum, Birmingham, Alabama
Seed	School	Conference	Record	Berth type
1	Kansas	Big 12	32–1	Automatic
2	Duke	ACC	23–8	At-Large
3	Georgia	SEC	24–8	At-Large
4	Arizona	Pac-10	19–9	At-Large
5	Maryland	ACC	21–10	At-Large
6	Illinois	Big Ten	21–9	At-Large
7	Marquette	Conference USA	22–8	Automatic
8	Purdue	Big Ten	17–11	At-Large
9	Rhode Island	Atlantic 10	20–9	At-Large
10	Providence	Big East	21–11	At-Large
11	USC	Pac-10	17–10	At-Large
12	College of Charleston	TAAC	28–2	Automatic
13	South Alabama	Sun Belt	23–6	Automatic
14	Chattanooga	Southern	22–10	Automatic
15	Murray State	Ohio Valley	20–9	Automatic
16	Jackson State	SWAC	14–15	Automatic

Midwest Regional – Alamodome, San Antonio, Texas
Seed	School	Conference	Record	Berth type
1	Minnesota (vacated)	Big Ten	27–3	Automatic
2	UCLA	Pac-10	21–7	Automatic
3	Cincinnati	Conference USA	25–7	At-Large
4	Clemson	ACC	21–9	At-Large
5	Tulsa	WAC	23–9	At-Large
6	Iowa State	Big 12	20–8	At-Large
7	Xavier	Atlantic 10	22–5	At-Large
8	Ole Miss	SEC	20–8	At-Large
9	Temple	Atlantic 10	19–10	At-Large
10	Vanderbilt	SEC	19–11	At-Large
11	Illinois State	Missouri Valley	24–5	Automatic
12	Boston University	America East	25–4	Automatic
13	Miami (OH)	MAC	21–8	Automatic
14	Butler	MCC	23–9	Automatic
15	Charleston Southern	Big South	17–12	Automatic
16	Southwest Texas State	Southland	16–12	Automatic

West Regional – San Jose Arena, San Jose, California
Seed	School	Conference	Record	Berth type
1	Kentucky	SEC	30–4	Automatic
2	Utah	WAC	26–3	Automatic
3	Wake Forest	ACC	23–6	At-Large
4	Saint Joseph's	Atlantic 10	24–6	Automatic
5	Boston College	Big East	21–8	Automatic
6	Stanford	Pac-10	20–7	At-Large
7	UNC Charlotte	Conference USA	21–8	At-Large
8	Iowa	Big Ten	21–9	At-Large
9	Virginia	ACC	19–10	At-Large
10	Georgetown	Big East	20–9	At-Large
11	Oklahoma	Big 12	19–7	At-Large
12	Valparaiso	Mid-Continent	24–6	Automatic
13	Pacific	Big West	23–5	Automatic
14	Saint Mary's	West Coast	23–7	Automatic
15	Navy	Patriot	20–8	Automatic
16	Montana	Big Sky	21–10	Automatic

== Bids by conference ==
Bids by Conference
Bids	Conference(s)
6	ACC, Big Ten
5	Atlantic 10, Big 12, Pac-10, SEC
4	Big East, C-USA
3	WAC
1	21 others

== Bracket ==
=== East Regional - Syracuse, New York ===
First round
1	North Carolina	82
16	Fairfield	74
Winston-Salem
8	Indiana	62
9	Colorado	80
5	California	55
12	Princeton	52
Winston-Salem
4	Villanova	101
13	Long Island	91
6	Louisville	65
11	Massachusetts	57
Pittsburgh
3	New Mexico	59
14	Old Dominion	55
7	Wisconsin	58
10	Texas	71
Pittsburgh
2	South Carolina	65
15	Coppin State	78

Quarter-finals
1	North Carolina	73
9	Colorado	56
5	California	75
4	Villanova	68
6	Louisville	64
3	New Mexico	63
10	Texas	82
15	Coppin State	81

Regional semifinals
1	North Carolina	63
5	California	57
6	Louisville	78
10	Texas	63

Regional Finals
1	North Carolina	97
6	Louisville	74

=== Southeast Regional - Birmingham, Alabama ===
First round
1	Kansas	78
16	Jackson State	64
Memphis
8	Purdue	83^{OT}
9	Rhode Island	76
5	Maryland	66
12	College of Charleston	75
Memphis
4	Arizona	65
13	South Alabama	57
6	Illinois	90
11	USC	77
Charlotte
3	Georgia	70
14	Chattanooga	73
7	Marquette	59
10	Providence	81
Charlotte
2	Duke	71
15	Murray State	68

Quarter-finals
1	Kansas	75
8	Purdue	61
12	College of Charleston	69
4	Arizona	73
6	Illinois	63
14	Chattanooga	75
10	Providence	98
2	Duke	87

Regional semifinals
1	Kansas	82
4	Arizona	85
14	Chattanooga	65
10	Providence	71

Regional Finals
4	Arizona	96^{OT}
10	Providence	92

=== Midwest Regional - San Antonio, Texas ===
First round
1	~~Minnesota~~	78
16	Southwest Texas State	46
Kansas City
8	Ole Miss	40
9	Temple	62
5	Tulsa	81
12	Boston University	52
Kansas City
4	Clemson	68
13	Miami (OH)	56
6	Iowa State	69
11	Illinois State	57
Auburn Hills
3	Cincinnati	86
14	Butler	69
7	Xavier	80
10	Vanderbilt	68
Auburn Hills
2	UCLA	109
15	Charleston Southern	75

Quarter-finals
1	~~Minnesota~~	76
9	Temple	57
5	Tulsa	59
4	Clemson	65
6	Iowa State	67
3	Cincinnati	66
7	Xavier	83
2	UCLA	96

Regional semifinals
1	~~Minnesota~~	90^{2OT}
4	Clemson	84
6	Iowa State	73
2	UCLA	74^{OT}

Regional Finals
1	~~Minnesota~~	80
2	UCLA	72

=== West Regional - San Jose, California ===
First round
1	Kentucky	92
16	Montana	54
Salt Lake City
8	Iowa	73
9	Virginia	60
5	Boston College	73
12	Valparaiso	66
Salt Lake City
4	Saint Joseph's	75
13	Pacific	65
6	Stanford	80
11	Oklahoma	67
Tucson
3	Wake Forest	68
14	Saint Mary's	46
7	Charlotte	79
10	Georgetown	67
Tucson
2	Utah	75
15	Navy	61

Quarter-finals
1	Kentucky	75
8	Iowa	69
5	Boston College	77
4	Saint Joseph's	81^{OT}
6	Stanford	72
3	Wake Forest	66
7	Charlotte	58
2	Utah	77

Regional semifinals
1	Kentucky	83
4	Saint Joseph's	68
6	Stanford	77
2	Utah	82^{OT}

Regional Finals
1	Kentucky	72
2	Utah	59

=== Final Four – Indianapolis, Indiana ===
National semifinals
E1	North Carolina	58
SE4	Arizona	66
MW1	~~Minnesota~~	69
W1	Kentucky	78

National Championship Game
SE4	Arizona	84^{OT}
W1	Kentucky	79

Minnesota vacated all NCAA tournament wins from the 1996–97 season due to an academic fraud scandal. Unlike forfeiture, a vacated game does not result in the other school being credited with a win, only with Minnesota removing the wins from its own record.

== Announcers ==
- Bob Carpenter or Jim Nantz/Billy Packer/Craig James – First & Second Round at Tucson, Arizona; Southeast Regional at Birmingham, Alabama; Final Four at Indianapolis, Indiana
  - Carpenter called the first-round games and Nantz called the second-round games at Tucson.
- Sean McDonough/Bill Raftery/Andrea Joyce – First & Second Round at Winston-Salem, North Carolina; West Regional at San Jose, California
- Tim Ryan/Al McGuire/Michele Tafoya – First & Second Round at Memphis, Tennessee; Midwest Regional at San Antonio, Texas
- Gus Johnson and Quinn Buckner – First & Second Round at Auburn Hills, Michigan; East Regional at Syracuse, New York
- Tim Brando and George Raveling – First & Second Round at Charlotte, North Carolina
- Mike Gorman and Jon Sundvold – First & Second Round at Pittsburgh, Pennsylvania
- Ted Robinson and Derrek Dickey – First & Second Round at Kansas City, Missouri
- Gary Thorne/Dan Bonner/Mike Mayock – First & Second Round at Salt Lake City, Utah

Pat O'Brien and Jim Nantz respectively served as the first round afternoon and evening studio hosts, joined by analyst Clark Kellogg.

== See also ==
- 1997 NCAA Division II men's basketball tournament
- 1997 NCAA Division III men's basketball tournament
- 1997 NCAA Division I women's basketball tournament
- 1997 NCAA Division II women's basketball tournament
- 1997 NCAA Division III women's basketball tournament
- 1997 National Invitation Tournament
- 1997 NAIA Division I men's basketball tournament
- 1997 NAIA Division II men's basketball tournament
