= 1996–97 Princeton Tigers men's basketball team =

American college basketball season

1996–97 Princeton Tigers men's basketball

Undefeated Ivy League Champion

1997 NCAA Men's Division I Tournament, Twelve Seed, Round of 64
- Conference: Ivy League
- Record: 24–4 (14–0, 1st Ivy)
- Head coach: Bill Carmody (1st season)
- Captain: Sydney Johnson
- Home arena: Jadwin Gymnasium

1996–97 Ivy League men's basketball standings
| | Conf. | | | | Overall |
| Team | W | | L | PCT | W | | L | PCT |
|---|---|---|---|---|---|---|---|---|
| Princeton | 14 | – | 0 | 1.000 | 24 | – | 4 | .857 |
| Dartmouth | 10 | – | 4 | .714 | 18 | – | 8 | .692 |
| Harvard | 10 | – | 4 | .714 | 17 | – | 9 | .654 |
| Penn | 8 | – | 6 | .571 | 12 | – | 14 | .462 |
| Cornell | 7 | – | 7 | .500 | 15 | – | 11 | .577 |
| Yale | 3 | – | 11 | .214 | 10 | – | 16 | .385 |
| Brown | 3 | – | 11 | .214 | 4 | – | 22 | .154 |
| Columbia | 1 | – | 13 | .071 | 6 | – | 20 | .231 |
Rankings from AP Poll

The 1996–97 Princeton Tigers men's basketball team represented Princeton University in intercollegiate college basketball during the 1996–97 NCAA Division I men's basketball season. The head coach was Bill Carmody and the team captain was Sydney Johnson. The team played its home games in the Jadwin Gymnasium on the University campus in Princeton, New Jersey. The team was the undefeated champion of the Ivy League, which earned them an invitation to the 64-team 1997 NCAA Division I men's basketball tournament where they were seeded twelfth in the East Region. This was Carmody's first season taking over the coaching duties from Pete Carril who had been Princeton coach since 1967 and retired as the Ivy League's winningest coach in terms of victories and conference championships.

Using the Princeton offense, the team posted a 24–4 overall record and a 14–0 conference record. On February 28 and March 1, 1997, Johnson established the current Ivy League record by making 11 consecutive three-point field goals against Columbia Lions and Cornell Big Red, respectively. The six for six performance against Columbia stands as the only Ivy League perfect three-point shot game of six attempts or more. The team ended the regular season on a nineteen-game winning streak, which tied a school record. Nonetheless, in a March 13, 1997, NCAA Division I men's basketball tournament East Regional first round game at the Joel Coliseum in Winston-Salem, North Carolina against the fifth-seeded California Golden Bears, the team lost 55–52.

The team was led by first team All-Ivy League selections Steve Goodrich and Johnson. Johnson earned Ivy League Men's Basketball Player of the Year. He earned the award for his defense and was the first winner with a single-digit scoring average. The team won the ninth of twelve consecutive national statistical championships in scoring defense with a 53.4 points allowed average. Goodrich repeated as the Ivy League's field goal percentage statistical champion with a 64.8% average in conference games.

== Schedule and results ==
The team posted a 24–4 (14–0 Ivy League) record.

| Date time, TV | Rank^{#} | Opponent^{#} | Result | Record | Site city, state |
Regular season
| Nov 20, 1996* | | at No. 22 Indiana; Preseason NIT | L 49–59 | 0–1 | Assembly Hall; Bloomington, Indiana |
| Dec 3, 1996* | | at Lafayette | W 75–54 | 1–1 | Allan P. Kirby Field House; Easton, Pennsylvania |
| Dec 6, 1996* | | vs. Rice; First Bank Classic | W 59–54 | 2–1 | Bradley Center; Milwaukee, Wisconsin |
| Dec 7, 1996* | | at Marquette; First Bank Classic | W 66–62 | 3–1 | Bradley Center; Milwaukee, Wisconsin |
| Dec 10, 1996* | | Bucknell | L 62–74 ^{OT} | 3–2 | Jadwin Gymnasium; Princeton, New Jersey |
| Dec 14, 1996* | | at Monmouth | W 48–46 | 4–2 | Boylan Gymnasium; West Long Branch, New Jersey |
| Dec 19, 1996* | | Lehigh | W 73–42 | 5–2 | Jadwin Gymnasium; Princeton, New Jersey |
| Dec 22, 1996* | | No. 12 North Carolina | L 60–69 | 5–3 | Jadwin Gymnasium; Princeton, New Jersey |
| Dec 27, 1996* | | vs. Texas A&M; Sierra Medical Center Sun Classic | W 46–38 | 6–3 | Don Haskins Center; El Paso, Texas |
| Dec 28, 1996* | | at UTEP; Sierra Medical Center Sun Classic | W 76–64 | 7–3 | Don Haskins Center; El Paso, Texas |
| Jan 3, 1997* | | at Manhattan | W 54–49 | 8–3 | Draddy Gymnasium; New York, New York |
| Jan 6, 1997* | | Rutgers | W 71–66 | 9–3 | Jadwin Gymnasium; Princeton, New Jersey |
| Jan 10, 1997 | | at Brown | W 44–40 | 10–3 (1–0) | Pizzitola Sports Center; Providence, Rhode Island |
| Jan 11, 1997* | | at Yale | W 58–45 | 11–3 (2–0) | John J. Lee Amphitheater; New Haven, Connecticut |
| Jan 27, 1997* | | Hamilton | W 90–48 | 12–3 | Jadwin Gymnasium; Princeton, New Jersey |
| Jan 31, 1997* | | at Cornell | W 66–42 | 13–3 (3–0) | Newman Arena; Ithaca, New York |
| Feb 1, 1997* | | at Columbia | W 65–53 | 14–3 (4–0) | Levien Gymnasium; New York, New York |
| Feb 7, 1997* | | Dartmouth | W 57–55 | 15–3 (5–0) | Jadwin Gymnasium; Princeton, New Jersey |
| Feb 8, 1997 | | Harvard | W 75–51 | 16–3 (6–0) | Jadwin Gymnasium; Princeton, New Jersey |
| Feb 11, 1997 | | at Penn | W 74–59 | 17–3 (7–0) | The Palestra; Philadelphia, Pennsylvania |
| Feb 14, 1997 | | Yale | W 81–51 | 18–3 (8–0) | Jadwin Gymnasium; Princeton, New Jersey |
| Feb 15, 1997 | | Brown | W 63–34 | 19–3 (9–0) | Jadwin Gymnasium; Princeton, New Jersey |
| Feb 21, 1997 | | at Harvard | W 66–61 | 20–3 (10–0) | Lavietes Pavilion; Cambridge, Massachusetts |
| Feb 22, 1997 | | at Dartmouth | W 60–53 | 21–3 (11–0) | Leede Arena; Hanover, New Hampshire |
| Feb 28, 1997 | | Columbia | W 67–52 | 22–3 (12–0) | Jadwin Gymnasium; Princeton, New Jersey |
| Mar 1, 1997 | | Cornell | W 70–47 | 23–3 (13–0) | Jadwin Gymnasium; Princeton, New Jersey |
| Mar 4, 1997 | | Penn | W 86–73 | 24–3 (14–0) | Jadwin Gymnasium; Princeton, New Jersey |
NCAA tournament
| Mar 13, 1997* | (12 E) | vs. (5 E) California; First round | L 52–55 | 24–4 | Lawrence Joel Veterans Memorial Coliseum; Winston-Salem, North Carolina |
*Non-conference game. ^{#}Rankings from AP Poll. (#) Tournament seedings in parentheses. E=East.
