= 1996–97 Alabama Crimson Tide men's basketball team =

American college basketball season

1996–97 Alabama Crimson Tide men's basketball
- Conference: Southeastern Conference
- Record: 17–14 (6–10 SEC)
- Head coach: David Hobbs (5th season)
- Assistant coaches: Mike Davis (2nd season); Bob Marlin (2nd season)
- Home arena: Coleman Coliseum

1996–97 Southeastern Conference men's basketball standings
	Conf.				Overall
Team	W		L	PCT	W		L	PCT
East
No. 6 South Carolina	15	–	1	.938	24	–	8	.750
No. 5 Kentucky†	13	–	3	.813	35	–	5	.875
No. 17 Georgia	10	–	6	.625	24	–	9	.727
Vanderbilt	9	–	7	.563	19	–	12	.613
Florida	5	–	11	.313	13	–	17	.433
Tennessee	4	–	12	.250	11	–	16	.407
West
Ole Miss	11	–	5	.688	20	–	9	.690
Arkansas	8	–	8	.500	18	–	14	.563
Auburn	6	–	10	.375	16	–	15	.516
Alabama	6	–	10	.375	17	–	14	.548
Mississippi State	6	–	10	.375	12	–	18	.400
LSU	3	–	13	.188	10	–	20	.333
† 1997 SEC tournament winner Rankings from AP Poll

The 1996–97 Alabama Crimson Tide men's basketball team represented the University of Alabama in the 1996–97 NCAA Division I men's basketball season. The team's head coach was David Hobbs, who was in his fifth season at Alabama. The team played their home games at Coleman Coliseum in Tuscaloosa, Alabama. They finished the season with a record of 17–14, with a conference record of 6–10, which placed them in a tie for third in the SEC Western Division.

The Tide defeated Florida in the first round of the 1997 SEC men's basketball tournament, but lost to South Carolina in the quarterfinal. The Tide did not an invite to a postseason tournament, marking the first time the Tide didn't participate in the postseason since the 1987–88 season.

== Roster ==
1996–97 Alabama Crimson Tide men's basketball team
Players
Coaches

Pos.	#	Name	Height	Weight	Year	Previous school	Hometown
G	14	Eric Washington	6 ft 4 in (1.93 m)	—	Sr	Pearl High School	Pearl, Mississippi
G	4	Brian Williams	6 ft 1 in (1.85 m)	—	So	Davis High School	Montgomery, Alabama
F		Anton Reese	6 ft 3 in (1.91 m)	—	So	Lithonia High School	Lithonia, Georgia
C	54	Thalamus McGhee	6 ft 9 in (2.06 m)	—	Sr	Westfield High School	Houston, Texas
F	25	M.C. Mazique	6 ft 10 in (2.08 m)	—	So	Brooklyn, New York
G	30	Damon Bacote	6 ft 3 in (1.91 m)	—	Jr	Hampton High School	Hampton, Virginia
G	34	Blake Thrasher	6 ft 6 in (1.98 m)	—	So
C	44	Scott Hamilton	6 ft 8 in (2.03 m)	—	Jr
F	35	Demetrius Alexander	6 ft 9 in (2.06 m)	—	Jr	Hazelwood Central HS/Hutchinson CC	St. Louis, Missouri
G		George Brown	6 ft 0 in (1.83 m)	—	Jr
F		Ricky Poole	6 ft 7 in (2.01 m)	—	Jr
C	52	Jeremy Hays	6 ft 10 in (2.08 m)	—	Fr	Boaz High School	Boaz, Alabama
G		Nick Wilmott	6 ft 2 in (1.88 m)	—	Fr
G	21	Dejuan Thrasher	6 ft 6 in (1.98 m)	—	Fr

Head coach

- David Hobbs

Assistant coach(es)

- Mike Davis
- Bob Marlin

Legend

- (C) Team captain
- (S) Suspended
- (I) Ineligible
- (W) Walk-on
- Injured
- Current redshirt

== Schedule and results ==
Date time, TV	Rank^{#}	Opponent^{#}	Result	Record	Site city, state
Regular Season
Nov 22, 1996*		vs. UNC Wilmington; Top of The World Classic	W 58–51	1–0	Carlson Center; Fairbanks, AK
Nov 23, 1996*		vs. Southern Illinois; Top of the World Classic	W 79–58	2–0	Carlson Center; Fairbanks, AK
Nov 24, 1996*		vs. Middle Tennessee; Top of the World Classic	W 77–74	3–0	Carlson Center; Fairbanks, AK
Nov 30, 1996*		Northeastern Illinois	W 93–50	4–0	Coleman Coliseum; Tuscaloosa, AL
Dec 2, 1996*		Arkansas–Pine Bluff	W 95–44	5–0	Coleman Coliseum; Tuscaloosa, AL
Dec 5, 1996*		No. 16 Minnesota	W 70–67	6–0	Coleman Coliseum; Tuscaloosa, AL
Dec 7, 1996*		FIU	W 80–65	7–0	Coleman Coliseum; Tuscaloosa, AL
Dec 14, 1996*	No. 24	Western Carolina	W 100–48	8–0	Coleman Coliseum; Tuscaloosa, AL
Dec 18, 1996*	No. 20	North Texas	W 72–55	9–0	Coleman Coliseum; Tuscaloosa, AL
Dec 21, 1996*	No. 20	vs. VCU; Holiday Hoopfest	W 72–69	10–0	UAB Arena; Birmingham, AL
Dec 27, 1996*	No. 19	at San Jose State; Cable Car Classic	L 59–60 ^{OT}	10–1	The Event Center; San Jose, CA
Dec 28, 1996*	No. 19	vs. Santa Clara; Cable Car Classic	L 62–77	10–2	San Jose Arena; San Jose, CA
Jan 4, 1997		at Vanderbilt	L 84–92	10–3 (0–1)	Memorial Gymnasium; Nashville, TN
Jan 8, 1997		at Ole Miss	W 59–46	11–3 (1–1)	Tad Smith Coliseum; Oxford, MS
Jan 11, 1997*		Syracuse	L 66–70	11–4	Coleman Coliseum; Tuscaloosa, AL
Jan 15, 1997		Arkansas	L 68–72	11–5 (1–2)	Coleman Coliseum; Tuscaloosa, AL
Jan 18, 1997		at Florida	L 66–85	11–6 (1–3)	O'Connell Center; Gainesville, FL
Jan 22, 1997		South Carolina	L 60–62	11–7 (1–4)	Coleman Coliseum; Tuscaloosa, AL
Jan 25, 1997		LSU	W 75–66	12–7 (2–4)	Coleman Coliseum; Tuscaloosa, AL
Jan 28, 1997		at Auburn	L 62–72	12–8 (2–5)	Beard–Eaves Coliseum; Auburn, AL
Feb 1, 1997		at Mississippi State	L 51–64	12–9 (2–6)	Humphrey Coliseum; Starkville, MS
Feb 5, 1997		Georgia	L 74–83	12–10 (2–7)	Coleman Coliseum; Tuscaloosa, AL
Feb 8, 1997		at Tennessee	L 61–65	12–11 (2–8)	Thompson–Boling Arena; Knoxville, TN
Feb 12, 1997		Ole Miss	W 57–54	13–11 (3–8)	Coleman Coliseum; Tuscaloosa, AL
Feb 15, 1997		at LSU	W 78–72	14–11 (4–8)	Maravich Assembly Center; Baton Rouge, LA
Feb 19, 1997		No. 3 Kentucky	L 61–75	14–12 (4–9)	Coleman Coliseum; Tuscaloosa, AL
Feb 22, 1997		Auburn	W 55–50	15–12 (5–9)	Coleman Coliseum; Tuscaloosa, AL
Feb 26, 1997		at Arkansas	L 53–73	15–13 (5–10)	Bud Walton Arena; Fayetteville, AR
Mar 1, 1997		Mississippi State	W 78–49	16–13 (6–10)	Coleman Coliseum; Tuscaloosa, AL
SEC Tournament
Mar 6, 1997	(4 W)	vs. (5 E) Florida; SEC Tournament First Round	W 80–66	17–13	The Pyramid; Memphis, TN
Mar 7, 1997	(4 W)	vs. (1 E) No. 4 South Carolina; SEC Tournament Quarterfinals	L 61–72	17–14	The Pyramid; Memphis, TN
*Non-conference game. ^{#}Rankings from AP Poll. (#) Tournament seedings in parentheses.
