= Scott Padgett =

American basketball player-coach (born 1976)

Marshall Thundering Herd
- Title: Assistant coach
- League: Sun Belt Conference

Personal information
- Born: April 19, 1976 (age 50) Louisville, Kentucky, U.S.
- Listed height: 6 ft 9 in (2.06 m)
- Listed weight: 240 lb (109 kg)

Career information
- High school: St. Xavier (Louisville, Kentucky)
- College: Kentucky (1994–1999)
- NBA draft: 1999: 1st round, 28th overall pick
- Drafted by: Utah Jazz
- Playing career: 1999–2007
- Position: Power forward
- Number: 34, 35

Career history

Playing
- 1999–2003: Utah Jazz
- 2003–2005: Houston Rockets
- 2005–2006: New Jersey Nets
- 2006–2007: Houston Rockets
- 2007: Memphis Grizzlies
- 2007: CB Granada

Coaching
- 2009–2010: Kentucky (assistant)
- 2010–2012: Manhattan (assistant)
- 2012–2014: Samford (assistant)
- 2014–2020: Samford
- 2020–2021: New Mexico (assistant)
- 2021–2022: Manhattan (assistant)
- 2022–2026: Mississippi State (assistant)
- 2026–present: Marshall (assistant)

Career highlights
- As player: NCAA champion (1998); First-team All-SEC (1999); SEC tournament MVP (1999)
- Stats at NBA.com
- Stats at Basketball Reference
Medals
Men's basketball
Representing United States
Summer Universiade
Gold medal – first place	1997 Trapani	Team competition

Scott Anthony Padgett (born April 19, 1976) is an American former professional basketball player and current assistant coach for the Marshall Thundering Herd men's basketball team. He was formerly the head coach at Samford University. He played for the National Basketball Association's Utah Jazz, Houston Rockets, New Jersey Nets and Memphis Grizzlies.

== High school ==
Padgett was born and raised in Louisville, Kentucky. He played basketball at St. Xavier High School in Louisville, was recruited by head coach Rick Pitino and committed to play college basketball for the University of Kentucky.

== College ==
Padgett saw limited playing time during his freshman season (1994–95) on a roster that included future NBA players Wayne Turner, Tony Delk, Rodrick Rhodes, Walter McCarty, Jeff Sheppard, Mark Pope and Antoine Walker. Padgett averaged 2.0 points per game and 1.2 rebounds per game while appearing in 14 games. He also had academic problems and was not eligible to play during the following year.

Padgett returned to Kentucky for the second half of the 1996–97 season. He became an integral part of that team, playing alongside future NBA players Ron Mercer, Derek Anderson, Nazr Mohammed and Jamaal Magloire. Padgett scored 15 points against his hometown Louisville, 24 points against Tennessee and 17 points in the NCAA national championship game against Arizona. The 1996–97 Kentucky team finished as the NCAA runner-up. For the season Padgett averaged 9.6 points per game and 5.1 rebounds per game, and was named to the All-NCAA Final Four Team.

Padgett was the starting power forward on the 1997–98 team, and was one of its leading players as it won the 1998 NCAA tournament. During that season, he distinguished himself nationally with good inside play, strong rebounding, and surprising outside shooting skills for a big inside player. On the season Padgett averaged 11.4 points per game, 6.6 rebounds per game and 2.1 assists per game while shooting 48.0% from the floor, 39.4% from three-point range and 83.7% from the free throw line. In the NCAA tournament, he scored 19 points in a regional semifinal matchup against UCLA, 12 points—including a go-ahead three-pointer to cap a 17-point comeback—in a regional final against Duke, and 17 points in the NCAA national championship game against Utah. Honors Padgett won that season included being named First Team All-American (Wooden), All-NCAA Final Four Team, All-NCAA Regional Team, Second Team All-SEC (Coaches), Third Team All-SEC (AP), All-SEC Tournament and Academic All-SEC.

During Padgett's senior season he tallied his 1,000th career point at Kentucky. That 1998–99 team lost the NCAA regional final. In his senior season, he averaged 12.6 points per game, 5.9 rebounds per game and 2.6 assists per game. Highlights of the season included scoring 29 points and grabbing 10 rebounds against the University of Kansas in a second-round NCAA tournament game. Padgett was also named to the All-NCAA Regional Team, was First Team All-SEC (Coaches) and Second Team All-SEC (AP) and Academic All-SEC. He was also named the Most Valuable Player of the Southeastern Conference tournament.

== NBA ==
Padgett was selected with the 28th overall pick by the Utah Jazz in the first round of the 1999 NBA draft. During his rookie season, he started nine games and averaged 2.6 points per game. By his third season Padgett was already established in the team's rotation, averaging 6.7 points and 3.8 rebounds per game, and appeared in every game during his fourth and final season with the team.

In 2003, Padgett joined the Houston Rockets and was mainly utilized as a backup for two seasons which included the highlight of his NBA career where on January 21, 2005, he made a one-handed, off-balance last-second shot to win against the New York Knicks. After the 2004–05 season he signed with the New Jersey Nets.

On June 30, 2006, Padgett was waived by the Nets, and returned to the Rockets on September 30. On February 13, 2007, he was traded to the Memphis Grizzlies for center Jake Tsakalidis. He was waived on April 4. At the end of his seventh NBA season, Padgett scored 1,874 points in 448 games.

On April 7, 2007, Padgett signed for the remaining of the year with CB Granada of the ACB.

== Media career ==
In 2007, Padgett left the NBA and returned to Louisville, co-hosting The Dave and Scott Show with former University of Louisville football player Dave Ragone. This program was a sports talk morning radio show that was syndicated throughout the state of Kentucky from 6 a.m. to 8 a.m. on 93.9 FM The Ticket (ESPN Radio). In late 2008, 93.9 The Ticket was taken off the air and moved to their AM 1600 sister station. The Dave and Scott Show was moved to television on Louisville's CW affiliate in the same time slot.

== Coaching career ==
On April 16, 2009, it was announced that Padgett would be returning to his alma mater along with his former college teammate Tony Delk to serve on coach John Calipari's staff at the University of Kentucky. Padgett left Kentucky to take a job coaching at Manhattan College for the 2010–11 season where he served as an assistant under former teammate Steve Masiello.

On April 25, 2012, Padgett was hired by head coach Bennie Seltzer to join the new coaching staff at Samford in Birmingham, Alabama. When Seltzer was dismissed in June 2014, Padgett was promoted to head coach of the Bulldogs. Padgett was let go on March 16, 2020, after six seasons. On July 31, 2020, Padgett was hired as an assistant coach on Paul Weir's staff at New Mexico.

On June 22, 2026, Padgett was hired as an assistant coach at Marshall under head coach Cornelius Jackson.

== Career statistics ==
Legend
GP	Games played	GS	Games started	MPG	Minutes per game
FG%	Field goal percentage	3P%	3-point field goal percentage	FT%	Free throw percentage
RPG	Rebounds per game	APG	Assists per game	SPG	Steals per game
BPG	Blocks per game	PPG	Points per game	**Bold**	Career high
*	Led the league

=== NBA ===
==== Regular season ====
Year	Team	GP	GS	MPG	FG%	3P%	FT%	RPG	APG	SPG	BPG	PPG
1999–2000	Utah	47	**9**	9.2	.314	.295	.704	1.9	.5	.3	.2	2.6
2000–01	Utah	27	0	4.7	.419	.556	.750	1.4	.2	.2	.1	2.1
2001–02	Utah	75	1	**17.3**	**.476**	**.434**	.735	**3.8**	**1.1**	**.6**	.2	**6.7**
2002–03	Utah	**82***	2	16.1	.402	.338	.757	3.3	1.0	.5	**.3**	5.7
2003–04	Houston	58	5	9.4	.443	.431	.750	2.4	.4	.2	.2	3.4
2004–05	Houston	66	0	14.3	.421	.397	.725	2.8	.8	.5	.2	4.2
2005–06	New Jersey	62	1	11.6	.353	.347	**.794**	2.7	.7	.5	.2	3.4
2006–07	Houston	24	0	8.3	.306	.242	.545	1.9	.3	.2	.1	1.8
2006–07	Memphis	7	0	4.7	.143	.000	.000	1.3	.0	.1	.0	.3
Career		448	18	12.5	.410	.373	.736	2.7	.7	.4	.2	4.2

==== Playoffs ====
Year	Team	GP	GS	MPG	FG%	3P%	FT%	RPG	APG	SPG	BPG	PPG
2000	Utah	**8**	0	7.4	.375	.333	–	2.1	.6	.1	**.3**	1.9
2002	Utah	4	0	11.8	.462	.000	.800	**3.5**	.5	.3	**.3**	4.0
2003	Utah	4	0	13.3	.421	.286	.500	2.3	**1.0**	**.8**	.0	**4.8**
2004	Houston	4	0	3.5	.400	.333	–	.8	.0	.3	**.3**	1.3
2005	Houston	7	**4**	**15.6**	.375	**.417**	**1.000**	2.7	.6	.4	**.3**	3.6
2006	New Jersey	3	0	3.0	**.500**	.000	.500	1.0	.0	.3	.0	1.0
Career		30	4	9.7	.405	.314	.727	2.2	.5	.3	.2	2.8

== Head coaching record ==
Record table
Season	Team	Overall	Conference	Standing	Postseason
Samford Bulldogs (Southern Conference) (2014–2020)
2014–15	Samford	13–19	6–12	7th	
2015–16	Samford	14–19	4–14	T–8th	
2016–17	Samford	20–16	8–10	7th	CIT Second Round
2017–18	Samford	10–22	6–12	7th	
2018–19	Samford	17–16	6–12	T–6th	
2019–20	Samford	10–23	4–14	8th	
Samford:		84–115 (.422)	34–74 (.315)		
Total:		84–115 (.422)			

== Personal ==
Scott was born to Linda and Will Padgett. He is married to Cynthia and has three children: Logan, Lucas and Layla.
