= Miles Simon =

American basketball player-coach

Personal information
- Born: November 21, 1975 (age 50) Stockholm, Sweden
- Listed height: 6 ft 3 in (1.91 m)
- Listed weight: 202 lb (92 kg)

Career information
- High school: Mater Dei (Santa Ana, California)
- College: Arizona (1994–1998)
- NBA draft: 1998: 2nd round, 42nd overall pick
- Drafted by: Orlando Magic
- Playing career: 1999–2004
- Position: Shooting guard
- Number: 34, 7, 18
- Coaching career: 2005–2024

Career history

Playing
- 1998–1999: Orlando Magic
- 2000: Maccabi Ra'anana
- 2000: Hapoel Holon
- 2000–2001: Basket Livorno
- 2001–2002: Dakota Wizards
- 2002: Varese
- 2002–2003: Dakota Wizards
- 2004: Tuborg Pilsener
- 2004: Reggiana

Coaching
- 2005–2008: Arizona (assistant)
- 2017–2021: Los Angeles Lakers (assistant)
- 2021–2023: South Bay Lakers
- 2023–2024: Phoenix Suns (assistant)

Career highlights
- As player: CBA champion (2002); CBA Finals MVP (2002); CBA Most Valuable Player (2002); All-CBA First Team (2002); CBA Newcomer of the Year (2002); NCAA champion (1997); NCAA Final Four Most Outstanding Player (1997); Consensus first-team All-American (1998); First-team All-Pac-10 (1998); No. 34 retired by Arizona Wildcats; As assistant coach: NBA champion (2020)
- Stats at NBA.com
- Stats at Basketball Reference

Miles Julian Simon (born November 21, 1975) is an American former basketball player who is a college basketball announcer for ESPN. As a player, Simon was the Most Outstanding Player of the 1997 NCAA tournament, leading the Arizona Wildcats to the national championship. As a professional, he played briefly in the NBA and then for several domestic leagues around the world.

== Early life and college career ==
Simon was born in Stockholm to an American father and a Norwegian mother. He played guard for the University of Arizona Wildcats men's basketball team, where he formed a formidable backcourt duo with future NBA point guard Mike Bibby. He was named the Most Outstanding Player in the 1997 NCAA tournament in which Arizona defeated three #1 seeded teams University of Kansas, University of North Carolina, and University of Kentucky in overtime to win the national championship. Simon had two 30-point performances during the 1997 NCAA tournament, including the championship game. In 2008, he was inducted into the Pac-12 Hall of Honor.

== Professional career ==
After college, Simon played five games with the Orlando Magic during the 1999 NBA season. He played for two seasons for the Dakota Wizards of the CBA, whom he led to a CBA championship in 2002. Simon earned enough awards and honors in 2001–2002 to make him the most decorated player in CBA history. He received honors as Player of the Week four times. He was named the CBA Newcomer of the Year, the CBA MVP, and the Playoff MVP. He also holds the CBA record for most free throws made in a row at 60.

== Post-playing career ==
In 2005, Simon was announced as an assistant coach under his collegiate head coach Lute Olson at his alma mater winning the conference championship and reaching the Elite Eight in March 2005. He remained an assistant coach until May 2008, when it was announced by the Arizona athletics department that his coaching contract would not be renewed.

Simon later worked with ESPN as an analyst after his time with Arizona ended.

On June 27, 2017, he joined the Los Angeles Lakers as an assistant coach.

In 2021, he was named the head coach of the Los Angeles Lakers' development team, the South Bay Lakers, in the NBA G League.

On June 17, 2023, it was reported that Simon was hired as an assistant coach for the Phoenix Suns under head coach Frank Vogel. The hiring, alongside the rest of the Suns' newest coaching staff, was made official on June 21, 2023. Simon would later be fired alongside the rest of Frank Vogel's coaching staff (outside of David Fizdale) on May 12, 2024, following the replacement of Vogel with Mike Budenholzer.
