= 1997 SEC men's basketball tournament =

- Classification: Division I
- Season: 1996–97
- Teams: 12
- Site: Pyramid Arena; Memphis, Tennessee
- Champions: Kentucky Wildcats (21st title)
- Winning coach: Rick Pitino (5th title)
- MVP: Ron Mercer (Kentucky)
- Attendance: 172,027
- Television: Jefferson Pilot Sports (1st Round, Quarterfinals, Semifinals); CBS (Championship game)

1996–97 Southeastern Conference men's basketball standings
	Conf.				Overall
Team	W		L	PCT	W		L	PCT
East
No. 6 South Carolina	15	–	1	.938	24	–	8	.750
No. 5 Kentucky†	13	–	3	.813	35	–	5	.875
No. 17 Georgia	10	–	6	.625	24	–	9	.727
Vanderbilt	9	–	7	.563	19	–	12	.613
Florida	5	–	11	.313	13	–	17	.433
Tennessee	4	–	12	.250	11	–	16	.407
West
Ole Miss	11	–	5	.688	20	–	9	.690
Arkansas	8	–	8	.500	18	–	14	.563
Auburn	6	–	10	.375	16	–	15	.516
Alabama	6	–	10	.375	17	–	14	.548
Mississippi State	6	–	10	.375	12	–	18	.400
LSU	3	–	13	.188	10	–	20	.333
† 1997 SEC tournament winner Rankings from AP Poll

The 1997 SEC Men’s Basketball Tournament took place from March 6–9, 1997 at The Pyramid Arena in Memphis, Tennessee. The Kentucky Wildcats men's basketball team won the tournament and the SEC’s automatic bid to the 1997 NCAA Men’s Division I Basketball Tournament by defeating the Georgia Bulldogs by a score of 95–68 in the championship game.

== Television coverage ==
The first round, the quarterfinals, and the semifinals were regionally televised and syndicated by Jefferson Pilot Sports. The championship game was televised nationally on CBS.

== Tournament notes ==
- This was the second time that The Pyramid hosted the SEC Men’s Basketball Tournament.
- The 1997 tournament was Rick Pitino’s final tournament title win before he left the University of Kentucky to take a coaching job with the NBA's Boston Celtics.

== Bracket ==
First round
W4	Alabama	80
E5	Florida	66
E3	#24 Georgia	75
W6	LSU	54
E4	Vanderbilt	73
W5	Mississippi State	67
W3	Auburn	67
E6	Tennessee	54

Quarterfinals
E1	#4 South Carolina	72
W4	Alabama	61
W2	Arkansas	63
E3	#24 Georgia	65
W1	Ole Miss	64
E4	Vanderbilt	62
E2	#6 Kentucky	92
W3	Auburn	50

Semifinals
E1	#4 South Carolina	63
E3	#24 Georgia	78
W1	Ole Miss	70
E2	#6 Kentucky	88

Championship game
E3	#24 Georgia	68
E2	#6 Kentucky	95
