= Eugene Edgerson =

American basketball player

Eugene Edgerson (born February 10, 1978, in New Orleans, Louisiana) is an American basketball player who used to play for the Harlem Globetrotters. As is tradition with the Globetrotters, Edgerson has a nickname: "Wildkat", presumably in honor of his alma mater, the University of Arizona.

Edgerson spent 1996–2001 as a member of the Arizona Wildcats men's basketball team. He played on a pair of Final Four teams (1997, 2001) with the Wildcats and was a member of the UA 1997 National Championship squad. In a 1998 game vs. BYU, he intentionally threw an elbow into the face of BYU's Brett Jepsen that knocked Jepsen unconscious for 20 seconds and ended Jepsen's playing career. Edgerson wrote Jepsen a letter of apology but Jepsen did not respond.

Because of his aggressive style of play, All Sports Tucson named Edgerson one of the Top 5 Badass Wildcats of All Time.[3]

He is a member of Phi Beta Sigma fraternity. He appeared as a Globetrotter on the ESPN2 program Cold Pizza on March 1, 2007.

During his career at Arizona, Edgerson took a one-year hiatus from competitive basketball to fulfill student-teaching duties at a Tucson kindergarten. He was a detention officer and joined the Pima Community College Police Department after graduating for the Southern Arizona Law Enforcement Training Center.
