= Memphis Pyramid =

Megashop in Tennessee, United States

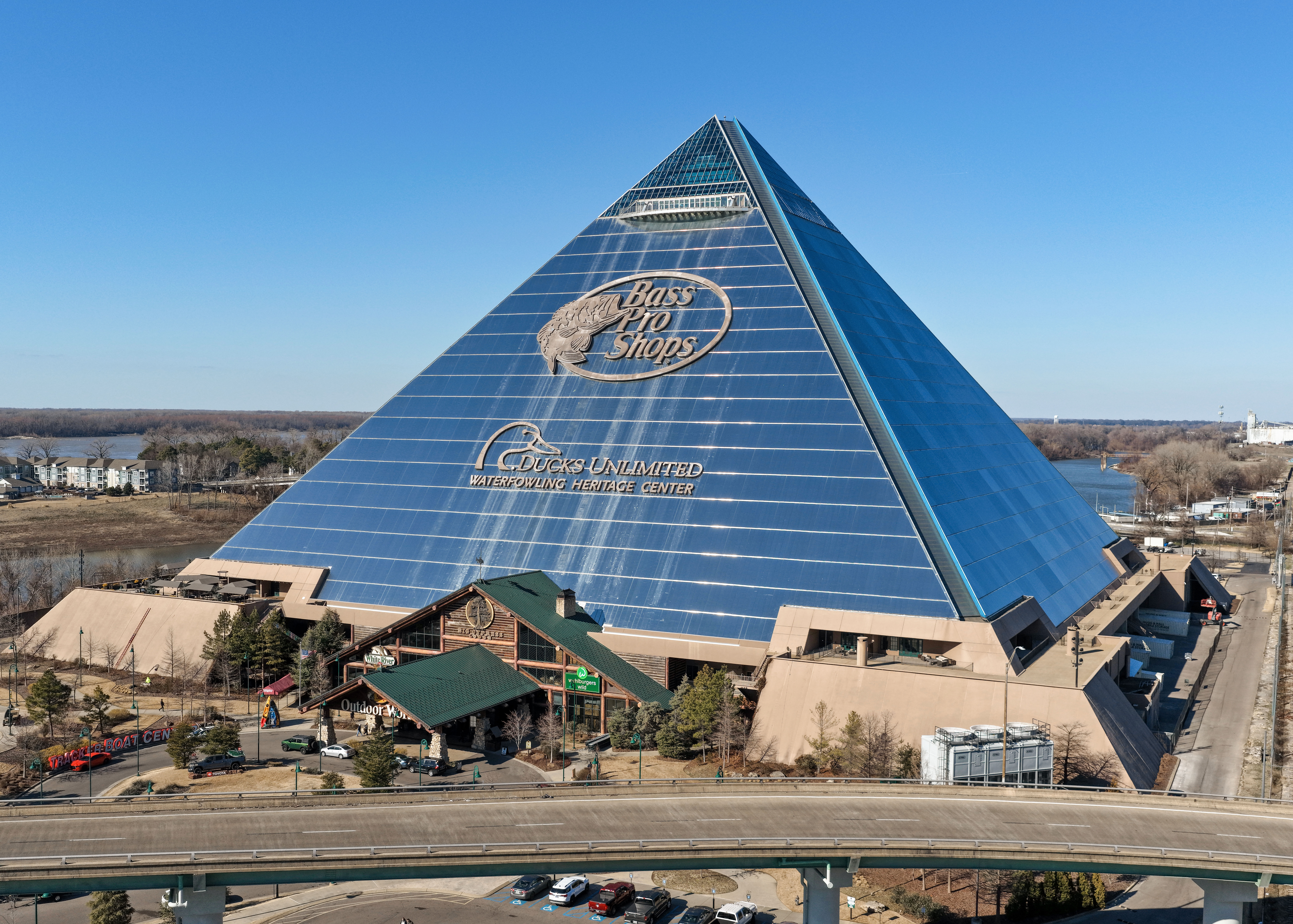
- The Pyramid in 2026
- Former names: Great American Pyramid; Pyramid Arena
- Alternative names: The Pyramid; Bass Pro Shops Pyramid; Tomb of Doom

General information
- Location: Memphis, Tennessee, 1 Bass Pro Drive
- Current tenants: Bass Pro Shops
- Groundbreaking: September 15, 1989
- Opened: November 9, 1991
- Renovated: November 2011–April 2015
- Cost: US$65 million ($133 million in 2024 dollars)
- Owner: City of Memphis

Height
- Height: 321 feet (98 m)

Design and construction
- Architects: Rosser Fabrap International; O.T. Marshall Architects (Bass Pro Shops improvements)

Other information
- Public transit: MATA; Main Street Line; Riverfront Loop

The Memphis Pyramid, formerly known as the Great American Pyramid and the Pyramid Arena, and colloquially known as the Bass Pro Shops Pyramid, is a pyramid-shaped building located in downtown Memphis, Tennessee, United States, at the bank of the Mississippi River. Built in 1991 as a 20,142-seat arena, the facility was owned and operated jointly by the city of Memphis and Shelby County until Shelby County sold its share to Memphis in April 2009. Its structure plays on the city's namesake in Egypt, which is known for its ancient pyramids. It is 321 feet (98 m) (about 32 stories) tall and has base sides of 591 feet (180 m); it is by some measures the tenth-tallest pyramid in the world.

The Memphis Pyramid has not been regularly used as a sports or entertainment venue since 2007. In 2015, the Pyramid re-opened as a Bass Pro Shops megastore, which included shopping, a hotel, restaurants, a bowling alley, and an archery range, with an outdoor observation deck adjacent to its apex. Ducks Unlimited also operates a museum on waterfowl hunting and wetlands conservation inside of the store.

== Construction ==
The Great American Pyramid was first conceived around 1954 by Mark C. Hartz, a Memphis artist. The project originally included three pyramids located on the south bluffs of Memphis overlooking the Mississippi River. The largest of the three would have been scaled at two-thirds the size of the Great Pyramid of Giza near Memphis, Egypt; the flanking structures would have been scaled at two-thirds the size of the main pyramid. The project languished for three decades until Hartz's younger son, Memphian Jon Brent Hartz, resurrected the concept. Mark C. Hartz, who was well known for his architectural renderings, rendered a new bronze glass-glazed pyramid. After years of negotiations, the younger Hartz's concept was adopted by entrepreneur John Tigrett as a symbol for the city of Memphis. The groundbreaking ceremony was held on September 15, 1989, and the building was opened on November 9, 1991.

The construction of the building was managed by Sidney Shlenker, part-owner of the Denver Nuggets and several entertainment companies, whom Tigrett had brought to Memphis to develop tourist attractions in the building. Originally, there were plans for a shortwave radio station broadcasting Memphis music, an observation deck with an inclinator along the side of the building, a Hard Rock Cafe, a music museum, a College Football Hall of Fame, and a theme park on Mud Island. However, the plans were scrapped because of a fallout between Tigrett and Shlenker, and the latter's financial difficulties.

== Various former uses and events ==
Pyramid Arena
- The Pyramid
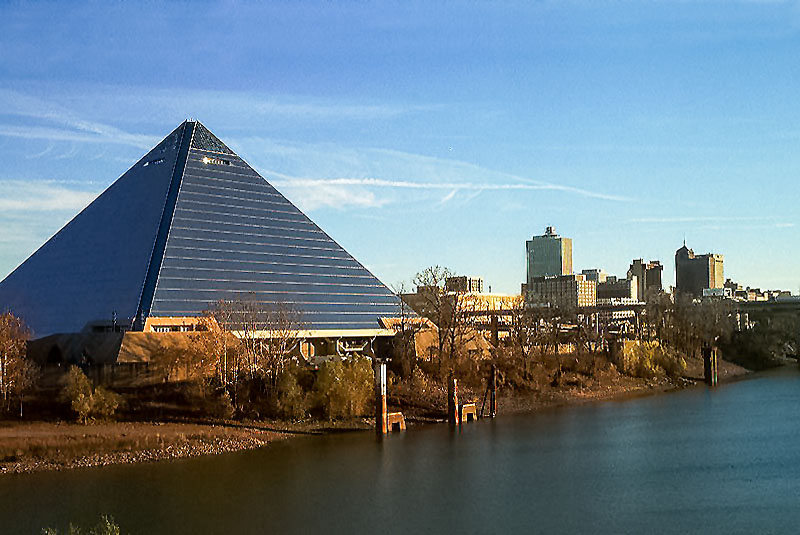
- The Pyramid Arena, as seen from the Auction Avenue bridge in 2002.
- Interactive map of Pyramid Arena
- Address: 1 Auction Avenue
- Location: Memphis, Tennessee
- Coordinates: 35°9′20″N 90°3′7″W
- Owner: City of Memphis
- Operator: SMG
- Capacity: Concerts: 21,000; Basketball: 20,142 (1991–2001); 19,405 (2001–2002); 19,351 (2002–2004)

Construction
- Groundbreaking: September 15, 1989
- Opened: November 9, 1991
- Closed: February 3, 2007
- Cost: US$65 million ($133 million in 2024 dollars)
- Architect: Rosser Fabrap International
- Structural engineer: Walter P. Moore & Associates, Inc.
- General contractor: Huber, Hunt & Nichols

Tenants
- Memphis Tigers (NCAA) (1991–2004); Memphis Pharaohs (AFL) (1995–1996); Memphis Grizzlies (NBA) (2001–2004)

The Pyramid was the home court of the University of Memphis men's basketball program starting in 1991, and later for the National Basketball Association's Memphis Grizzlies after they relocated from Vancouver in 2001. However, both teams left The Pyramid in November 2004 to move into the newly built FedExForum. It was also home of the Memphis Pharaohs of the Arena Football League for the 1995 and 1996 AFL season before they relocated to Portland in 1997.

The arena hosted the 1993 Great Midwest Conference Men's and Women's basketball tournaments, the 1994 and 1997 Southeastern Conference men's basketball tournament, the 1996 and 2000 Conference USA men's basketball tournament, and the 2003 Conference USA women's basketball tournament. It also held the first and second rounds of the NCAA Tournament in 1995, 1997, and 2001. The Grateful Dead played two concerts at the arena on April 1 and 2, 1995.

Singer Mary J. Blige performed at the arena in September 1997 during her Share My World Tour.

Canadian country-pop singer Shania Twain performed two sold-out concerts of her blockbuster Come On Over Tour at the Pyramid on November 14, 1998 and July 1, 1999, respectively. As part of her 2003 Up! Tour, she announced a concert at the venue to take place on November 26, later cancelled due to scheduling conflicts.

The Pyramid was the site in 1999 of the WWF St. Valentine's Day Massacre: In Your House pay-per-view which featured Big Show's WWE debut (under his real name Paul Wight); also in 1999 the rock bands the Rolling Stones and Phish played sold-out concerts. Phish released an audio recording of the concert, entitled "Memphis '99", as a digital download in 2022.

On June 8, 2002, the Pyramid hosted Lennox Lewis vs. Mike Tyson, one of the biggest professional boxing events in history, which Lewis won by knockout in the eighth round. The following year it hosted Mike Tyson vs. Clifford Etienne, a fight that Tyson won by knockout in the first round.

On August 16, 2002, the arena hosted a concert that commemorated the 25th anniversary of Elvis Presley's death.

From 2002 to 2006, the annual Church of God in Christ international holy convocations were held here.

Filmmaker Craig Brewer used the building as a sound stage for his film Black Snake Moan in late 2005.

Bob Seger & The Silver Bullet Band performed what was the last concert played in the Pyramid, in February 2007. This was also the final event in the building while the Pyramid was a sports arena.

It was also the graduation hall for Raleigh-Egypt High School.

== Troubles and closure ==
In 2001, the city of Memphis attempted to relocate the Vancouver Grizzlies or the Charlotte Hornets to Memphis. While the Pyramid was functional and profitable, it was well short of NBA standards despite being only a decade old. The renovations required to make the building a viable long-term venue for an NBA franchise would have been prohibitively expensive. They would have also required taking the arena offline for a year. As a result, the $250 million FedExForum was built as a condition of the Grizzlies' move from Vancouver and opened in 2004. The city of Memphis spent $7 million on renovations such as improved dressing rooms and new television camera platforms for the Grizzlies' three-year stay in the arena.

While hosting the Grizzlies, the arena lost $200,000 in 2002.

The City of Memphis's contract with the Grizzlies forbade the use of The Pyramid without the team's approval, and, as a result, it went dark. The Memphis city council voted to keep the arena open in 2004. A committee headed by Memphis businessman Scott Ledbetter studied possible uses of the arena in 2005 and considered such uses as converting the arena into a casino, an aquarium, a shopping mall, or an indoor theme park. In November 2006, Congressman-elect Steve Cohen (D-Tennessee) suggested that he would attempt to open a Mid-American branch of the Smithsonian Institution in the building. However, these plans were never realized. In the end, the Ledbetter committee on the building's future recommended that it be used for destination retail, which would create more jobs and new tax revenues.

== Bass Pro Shops and redevelopment ==
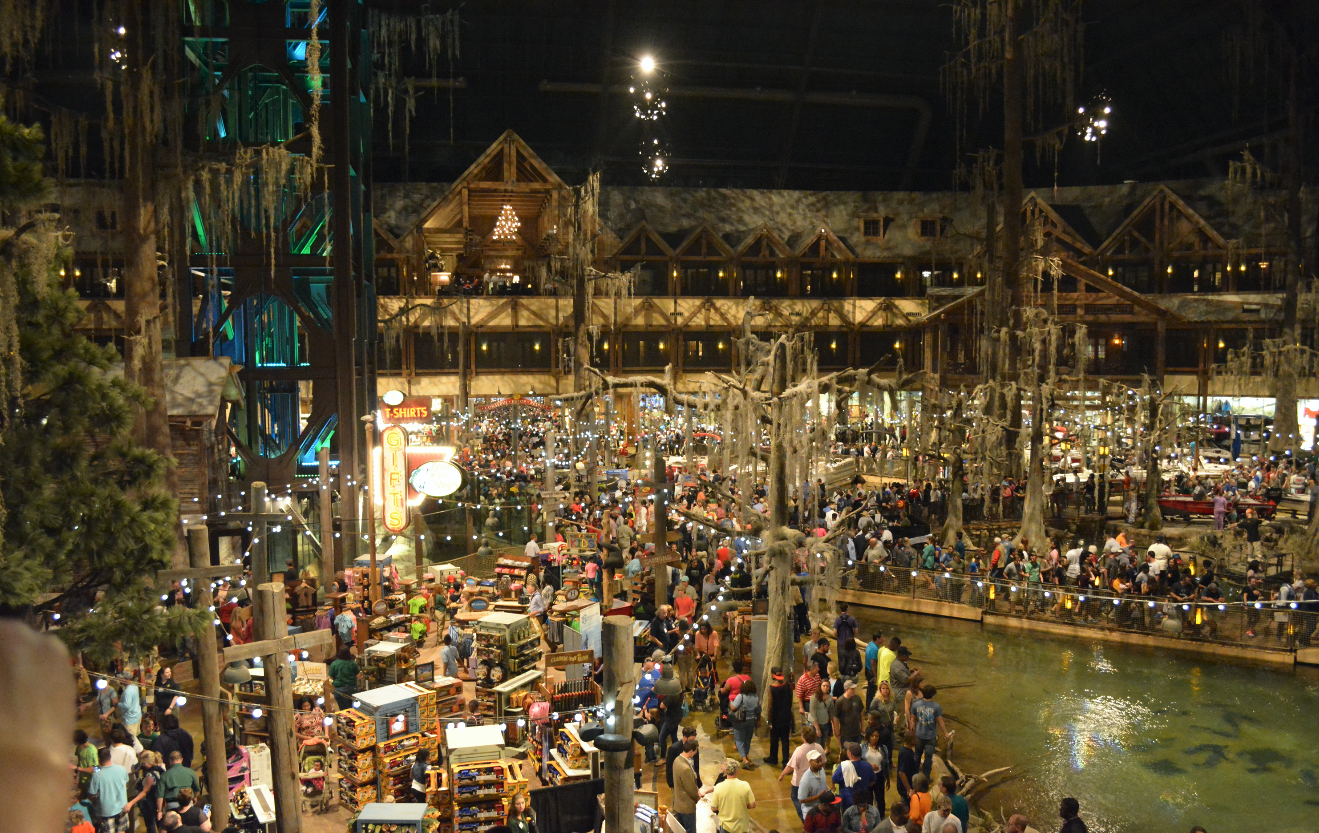
Interior of the Pyramid on Bass Pro Shops' opening day

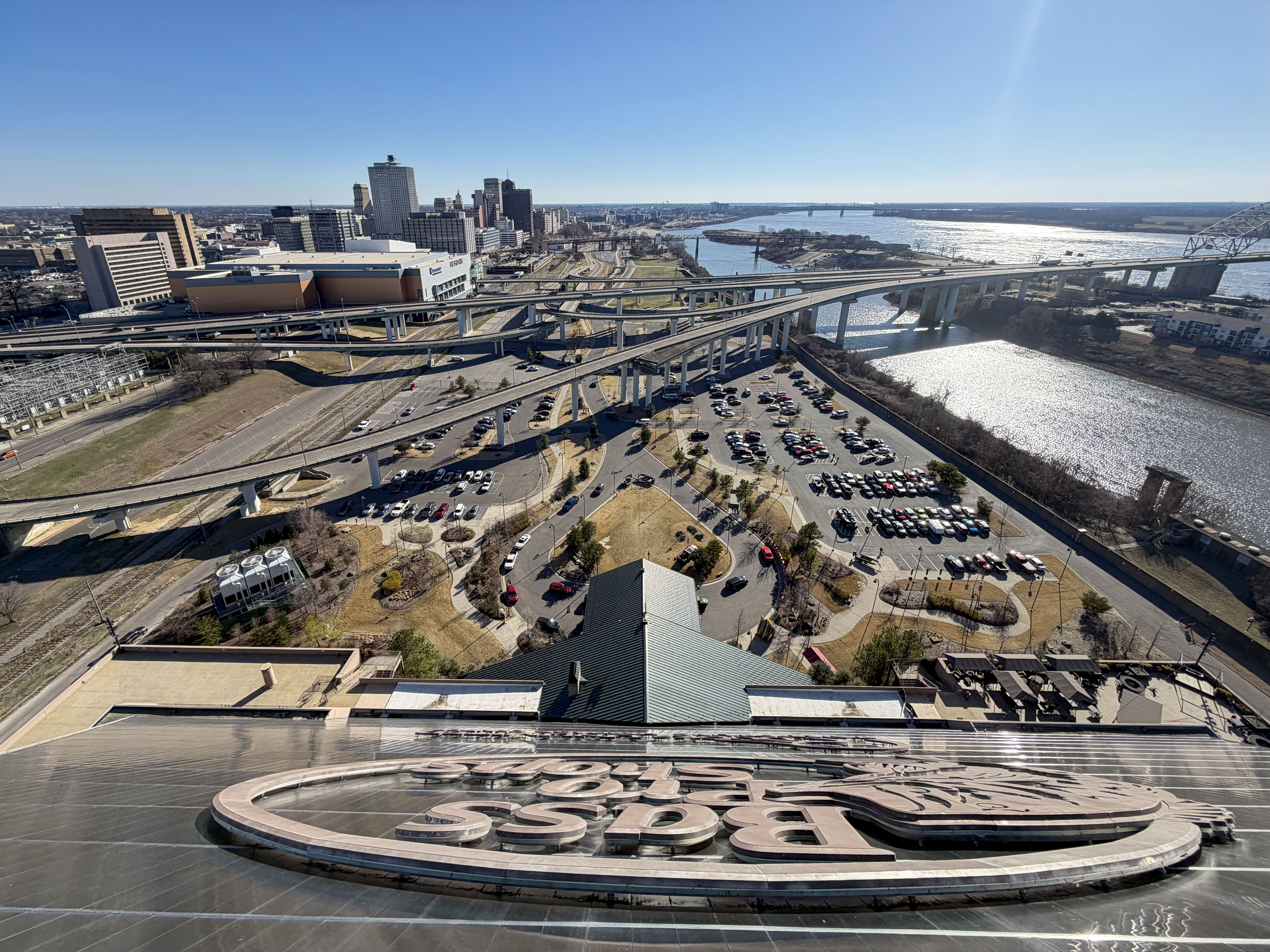
View of downtown Memphis from the observation deck

In October 2005, media speculation began to focus on an aquarium or a Bass Pro Shops superstore as the most likely long-term tenants of the arena. In 2008, the city and Bass Pro Shops reached a tentative agreement, short on details, but based on an intent to develop the then-abandoned structure. On June 30, 2010, after 5 years of negotiating, Bass Pro Shops and the City of Memphis signed an agreement for a 55-year lease for a Bass Pro Shops megastore. In addition, the redevelopment plans included revitalizing the Pinch District, which is the neighborhood east of the Pyramid. The city invested $30 million and hired O.T. Marshall Architects to help with the seismic retrofitting of the structure, which was funded by sales tax revenue in the surrounding area. O.T. Marshall and Insight Design Architects was later hired by Bass Pro Shops for its renovations and construction, which led to its opening April 29, 2015. Construction was completed by W.G. Yates & Sons Construction Company.

In addition to the retail store itself, Bass Pro Shops at the Pyramid is home to an archery range, a shooting range, and a laser arcade. The building also includes a Wahlburgers Wild and an Uncle Buck's Fishbowl and Grill with a bowling alley and a saltwater aquarium. The tallest freestanding elevator in America takes visitors to the Lookout at the Pyramid at the apex of the building, where people can take in the view on an indoor and outdoor observation deck or dine and drink at the Lookout, which is a restaurant, bar, and aquarium at the top of the building. At the base of the Pyramid is a 100-room hotel, the Big Cypress Lodge. Bass Pro Shops at the Pyramid contains 600,000 gallons of water features and the largest collection of waterfowl and hunting-related equipment in the world.

Over 3 million people visited Bass Pro Shops at the Pyramid in 2015. In 2015, Bass Pro Shops considered adding a zip-line and a second hotel to the Pyramid.

In 2011, a drawing of the pyramid was incorporated into the standard design of Tennessee's state-issued driver's licenses alongside Nashville's AT&T Building, Knoxville's Sunsphere, and Chattanooga's Tennessee Aquarium. The design was replaced with a new one featuring the state capitol in 2024.

On February 22, 2016, the popular Youtube group Dude Perfect uploaded a sponsored trick shot video titled "Bass Pro Edition", which showed them taking advantage of and enjoying the shop's amenities. The group returned to the pyramid in 2021 to film the twenty-ninth episode of their popular series Overtime.

== See also ==
- List of tallest buildings in Memphis

Preceded by General Motors Place	Home of the Memphis Grizzlies; 2001–2004	Succeeded by FedExForum
Preceded by first arena	Home of Memphis Pharaohs; 1995–1996	Succeeded by BancorpSouth Arena
