= 1996–97 Old Dominion Monarchs basketball team =

American college basketball season

1996–97 Old Dominion Monarchs basketball

CAA tournament & regular season champions

NCAA tournament, First Round
- Conference: Colonial Athletic Association
- Record: 22–11 (10–6 CAA)
- Head coach: Jeff Capel II
- Home arena: Norfolk Scope

1996–97 CAA men's basketball standings
	Conf.				Overall
Team	W		L	PCT	W		L	PCT
Old Dominion †	10	–	6	.625	22	–	11	.667
UNC Wilmington	10	–	6	.625	16	–	14	.533
East Carolina	9	–	7	.563	17	–	10	.630
VCU	9	–	7	.563	14	–	13	.519
William & Mary	8	–	8	.500	12	–	16	.429
James Madison	8	–	8	.500	16	–	13	.552
American	7	–	9	.438	11	–	16	.407
Richmond	7	–	9	.438	13	–	15	.464
George Mason	4	–	12	.250	10	–	17	.370
† 1997 CAA tournament winner Rankings from AP poll

The 1996–97 Old Dominion Monarchs basketball team represented Old Dominion University in the 1996–97 college basketball season. This was head coach Jeff Capel's third of seven seasons at Old Dominion. The Monarchs competed in the Colonial Athletic Association and played their home games at the ODU Fieldhouse. They finished the season 22–11, 10–6 in CAA play to finish as regular season conference champions. They went on to win the 1997 CAA men's basketball tournament to earn the CAA's automatic bid to the NCAA tournament. They earned a 14 seed in the East Region where they were beaten by No. 3 seed New Mexico in the opening round.

== Roster ==
1996–97 Old Dominion Monarchs men's basketball team
Players	Coaches
Pos. / # / Name / Height / Weight / Year / Previous school / Hometown; F / 3 / Cal Bowdler / 6 ft 10 in (2.08 m) / 230 lb (104 kg) / So / Rappahannock / Warsaw, Virginia	Head coach: Jeff Capel II; Assistant coach(es) Legend: (C) Team captain; (S) Suspended; (I) Ineligible; (W) Walk-on; Injured; Current redshirt

== Schedule and results ==
Date time, TV	Rank^{#}	Opponent^{#}	Result	Record	Site (attendance) city, state
Exhibition
Nov 9, 1996*		Sundance	W 97–75	–	Norfolk Scope; Norfolk, Virginia
Nov 16, 1996*		Court Authority	W 83–70	–	Norfolk Scope; Norfolk, Virginia
Regular season
Nov 22, 1996*		at Towson State	W 84–82	1–0	Towson Center; Towson, Maryland
Nov 25, 1996*		Toledo	W 65–57	2–0	Norfolk Scope; Norfolk, Virginia
Nov 30, 1996*		UNC Charlotte	W 65–64	3–0	Norfolk Scope; Norfolk, Virginia
Dec 2, 1996*		Tennessee State	W 95–85	4–0	Norfolk Scope; Norfolk, Virginia
Dec 5, 1996*		Washington	W 67–57	5–0	Norfolk Scope; Norfolk, Virginia
Dec 10, 1996*		at Hampton	W 57–46	6–0	Convocation Center; Hampton, Virginia
Dec 13, 1996*		vs. Eastern Michigan	L 78–79	6–1	Carrier Dome; Syracuse, New York
Dec 14, 1996*		vs. Pepperdine	W 56–47	7–1	Carrier Dome; Syracuse, New York
Dec 19, 1996*		at Mississippi State	L 73–80	7–2	Humphrey Coliseum; Starkville, Mississippi
Dec 30, 1996*		vs. Nebraska; Puerto Rico Holiday Classic	L 66–72	7–3	Eugene Guerra Sports Complex; Bayamón, Puerto Rico
Dec 31, 1996*		vs. Southeast Missouri State; Puerto Rico Holiday Classic	W 74–61	8–3	Eugene Guerra Sports Complex; Bayamón, Puerto Rico
Jan 1, 1997*		vs. Mississippi State; Puerto Rico Holiday Classic	W 72–71 ^{OT}	9–3	Eugene Guerra Sports Complex; Bayamón, Puerto Rico
Jan 4, 1997		at Richmond	W 76–69	10–3 (1–0)	Robins Center; Richmond, Virginia
Jan 8, 1997		at George Mason	W 94–85	11–3 (2–0)	Patriot Center; Fairfax, Virginia
Jan 11, 1997*		East Carolina	W 79–70	12–3 (3–0)	Norfolk Scope; Norfolk, Virginia
Jan 13, 1997		UNC Wilmington	W 61–45	13–3 (4–0)	Norfolk Scope; Norfolk, Virginia
Jan 15, 1997		at American	L 77–80 ^{OT}	13–4 (4–1)	Bender Arena; Washington, D.C.
Jan 18, 1997		at VCU; Rivalry	W 82–65	14–4 (5–1)	Richmond Coliseum; Richmond, Virginia
Jan 22, 1997		William & Mary; Rivalry	L 55–61	14–5 (5–2)	Norfolk Scope; Norfolk, Virginia
Jan 25, 1997		at James Madison; Rivalry	L 66–84	14–6 (5–3)	JMU Convocation Center; Harrisonburg, Virginia
Jan 29, 1997		at East Carolina	L 63–78	14–7 (5–4)	Williams Arena at Minges Coliseum; Greenville, North Carolina
Feb 1, 1997		Richmond	W 63–51	15–7 (6–4)	Norfolk Scope; Norfolk, Virginia
Feb 5, 1997		at William & Mary; Rivalry	L 52–80	15–8 (6–5)	William & Mary Hall; Williamsburg, Virginia
Feb 8, 1997		at UNC Wilmington	L 73–74 ^{OT}	15–9 (6–6)	Trask Coliseum; Wilmington, North Carolina
Feb 11, 1997*		at George Washington	L 63–68	15–10	Charles E. Smith Center; Washington, D.C.
Feb 15, 1997		VCU; Rivalry	W 75–70	16–10 (7–6)	Norfolk Scope; Norfolk, Virginia
Feb 19, 1997		American	W 99–61	17–10 (8–6)	Norfolk Scope; Norfolk, Virginia
Feb 22, 1997		George Mason	W 85–62	18–10 (9–6)	Norfolk Scope; Norfolk, Virginia
Feb 24, 1997		James Madison; Rivalry	W 72–66	19–10 (10–6)	Norfolk Scope; Norfolk, Virginia
CAA tournament
Mar 1, 1997*		vs. Richmond; Quarterfinals	W 69–56	20–10	Richmond Coliseum; Richmond, Virginia
Mar 2, 1997*		vs. William & Mary; Semifinals	W 70–62	21–10	Richmond Coliseum; Richmond, Virginia
Mar 3, 1997*		vs. James Madison; Championship game	W 62–58 ^{OT}	22–10	Richmond Coliseum; Richmond, Virginia
NCAA tournament
Mar 14, 1997*	(14 E)	vs. (3 E) No. 11 New Mexico; First round	L 55–59	22–11	Civic Arena; Pittsburgh, Pennsylvania
*Non-conference game. ^{#}Rankings from AP poll. (#) Tournament seedings in parentheses. E=East. All times are in Eastern Time.
