= 1996–97 Cincinnati Bearcats men's basketball team =

American college basketball season

1996–97 Cincinnati Bearcats men's basketball

C-USA regular season champions

NCAA tournament, Second round
- Conference: Conference USA

Ranking
- Coaches: No. 16
- AP: No. 10
- Record: 26–8 (12–2 C-USA)
- Head coach: Bob Huggins
- Assistant coaches: Larry Harrison; Steve Moeller; John Loyer
- Home arena: Myrl Shoemaker Center

1996–97 Conference USA men's basketball standings
	Conf.				Overall
Team	W		L	PCT	W		L	PCT
Blue
No. 10 Cincinnati	12	–	2	.857	26	–	8	.765
Marquette †	9	–	5	.643	22	–	9	.710
Saint Louis	4	–	10	.286	11	–	18	.379
DePaul	1	–	13	.071	3	–	23	.115
Red
Tulane	11	–	3	.786	20	–	11	.645
UAB	7	–	7	.500	18	–	14	.563
Southern Miss	6	–	8	.429	12	–	15	.444
South Florida	2	–	12	.143	8	–	19	.296
White
UNC Charlotte	10	–	4	.714	22	–	9	.710
Memphis	10	–	4	.714	16	–	15	.516
No. 25 Louisville	9	–	5	.643	26	–	9	.743
Houston	3	–	11	.214	11	–	16	.407
† 1997 Conference USA Tournament winner Rankings from AP Poll

The 1996–97 Cincinnati Bearcats men's basketball team represented the University of Cincinnati in NCAA Division I competition in the 1996–97 season. The Bearcats, coached by Bob Huggins, won Conference USA and reached the second round of the 1997 NCAA tournament. The team finished with an overall record of 26–8 (12–2 C-USA) and a No. 10 ranking in the final AP poll.

== Roster ==
1996–97 Cincinnati Bearcats men's basketball team
Players
Coaches

Pos.	#	Name	Height	Weight	Year	Hometown
F	34	Bobby Brannen	6 ft 7 in (2.01 m)	—	Jr	Cincinnati
G	33	Darnell Burton	6 ft 2 in (1.88 m)	—	Sr	Lexington, Kentucky
G	--	Terrence Davis	6 ft 3 in (1.91 m)	—	Sr
F	--	Ryan Fletcher	6 ft 9 in (2.06 m)	—	Sr	Franklin, Ohio
G	3	Damon Flint	6 ft 5 in (1.96 m)	—	Sr	Cincinnati
PF	25	Danny Fortson	6 ft 7 in (2.01 m)	250 lb (113 kg)	Jr	Pittsburgh, Pennsylvania
F	--	Julson Jackson	6 ft 9 in (2.06 m)	—	Jr
G		Melvin Levett	6 ft 3 in (1.91 m)	—	So	Cleveland, Ohio
F	--	Rod Monroe (W)	6 ft 4 in (1.93 m)	—	Jr

Head coach

- Bob Huggins (West Virginia)

Assistant coach(es)

- Larry Harrison (Pittsburgh)
- Steve Moeller (Otterbein)
- John Loyer (Akron)

Legend

- (C) Team captain
- (S) Suspended
- (I) Ineligible
- (W) Walk-on
- Injured
- Current redshirt

== Schedule ==
Date time, TV	Rank^{#}	Opponent^{#}	Result	Record	Site city, state
Regular Season
Nov 23, 1996*	No. 1	Western Carolina	W 99–72	1–0	Myrl H. Shoemaker Center; Cincinnati, Ohio
Nov 26, 1996*	No. 1	Xavier	L 69–71	1–1	Myrl H. Shoemaker Center; Cincinnati, Ohio
Nov 30, 1996*	No. 1	Rutgers	W 105–65	2–1	Myrl H. Shoemaker Center; Cincinnati, Ohio
Dec 4, 1996*	No. 4	vs. No. 1 Kansas; Great Eight	L 65–72	2–2	United Center; Chicago, Illinois
Dec 17, 1996*	No. 7	Howard	W 90–46	3–2	Myrl H. Shoemaker Center; Cincinnati, Ohio
Dec 19, 1996*	No. 7	Eastern Michigan	W 102–79	4–2	Myrl H. Shoemaker Center; Cincinnati, Ohio
Dec 28, 1996*	No. 7	vs. Western Kentucky; Gatorade Rock-N-Roll Shootout	W 81–57	5–2	Gund Arena; Cleveland, Ohio
Dec 30, 1996*	No. 6	vs. Southeast Missouri State; Puerto Rico Holiday Classic	W 80–57	6–2	Eugene Guerra Sports Complex; Bayamón, Puerto Rico
Dec 31, 1996*	No. 6	vs. Nebraska; Puerto Rico Holiday Classic	W 84–73	7–2	Eugene Guerra Sports Complex; Bayamón, Puerto Rico
Jan 1, 1997*	No. 6	vs. SW Missouri State; Puerto Rico Holiday Classic	W 101–60	8–2	Eugene Guerra Sports Complex; Bayamón, Puerto Rico
Jan 5, 1997	No. 6	at Saint Louis	W 64–52	9–2 (1–0)	Kiel Center; St. Louis, Missouri
Jan 8, 1997	No. 6	UAB	W 74–54	10–2 (2–0)	Myrl H. Shoemaker Center; Cincinnati, Ohio
Jan 10, 1997*	No. 6	Miami (OH)	W 91–61	11–2	Myrl H. Shoemaker Center; Cincinnati, Ohio
Jan 16, 1997*	No. 4	Temple; A-10/C-USA Challenge	L 55–70	11–3	Myrl H. Shoemaker Center; Cincinnati, Ohio
Jan 18, 1997*	No. 4	Arkansas	W 92–57	12–3	Myrl H. Shoemaker Center; Cincinnati, Ohio
Jan 21, 1997	No. 9	at UNC Charlotte	W 77–67	13–3 (3–0)	Dale F. Halton Arena; Charlotte, North Carolina
Jan 26, 1997*	No. 9	at USC	W 100–81	14–3	L.A. Sports Arena; Los Angeles, California
Jan 30, 1997	No. 8	at No. 9 Louisville	L 70–81	14–4 (3–1)	Freedom Hall; Louisville, Kentucky
Feb 1, 1997	No. 8	DePaul	W 90–53	15–4 (4–1)	Myrl H. Shoemaker Center; Cincinnati, Ohio
Feb 6, 1997	No. 12	No. 21 Tulane	W 65–64	16–4 (5–1)	Myrl H. Shoemaker Center; Cincinnati, Ohio
Feb 8, 1997	No. 12	Marquette	W 91–70	17–4 (6–1)	Myrl H. Shoemaker Center; Cincinnati, Ohio
Feb 10, 1997*	No. 8	at Washington	W 82–69	18–4	Hec Edmundson Pavilion; Seattle, Washington
Feb 13, 1997	No. 8	Saint Louis	W 69–56	19–4 (7–1)	Myrl H. Shoemaker Center; Cincinnati, Ohio
Feb 15, 1997*	No. 8	No. 12 South Carolina	L 83–97	19–5	Myrl H. Shoemaker Center; Cincinnati, Ohio
Feb 18, 1997	No. 11	Houston	W 97–64	20–5 (8–1)	Myrl H. Shoemaker Center; Cincinnati, Ohio
Feb 20, 1997	No. 11	at South Florida	W 76–56	21–5 (9–1)	Sun Dome; Tampa, Florida
Feb 22, 1997	No. 11	at DePaul	W 83–54	22–5 (10–1)	Rosemont Horizon; Rosemont, Illinois
Feb 25, 1997	No. 9	Southern Miss	W 63–49	23–5 (11–1)	Myrl H. Shoemaker Center; Cincinnati, Ohio
Feb 27, 1997	No. 9	at Marquette	W 80–74	24–5 (12–1)	Bradley Center; Milwaukee, Wisconsin
Mar 1, 1997	No. 9	at Memphis State	L 63–75	24–6 (12–2)	The Pyramid; Memphis, Tennessee
C-USA Tournament
Mar 6, 1997*	(1) No. 10	at (9) Saint Louis; Quarterfinals	W 71–43	25–6	Kiel Center; St. Louis, Missouri
Mar 7, 1997*	(1) No. 10	vs. (5) Marquette; Semifinals	L 79–91	25–7	Kiel Center; St. Louis, Missouri
NCAA Tournament
Mar 13, 1997*	(3 MW) No. 10	vs. (14 MW) Butler; First Round	W 86–69	26–7	Palace of Auburn Hills; Auburn Hills, Michigan
Mar 15, 1997*	(3 MW) No. 10	vs. (6 MW) No. 18 Iowa State; Second Round	L 66–67	26–8	Palace of Auburn Hills; Auburn Hills, Michigan
*Non-conference game. ^{#}Rankings from AP poll. (#) Tournament seedings in parentheses. MW=Midwest.

== Awards and honors ==
- Danny Fortson – C-USA Player of the Year, Consensus First-Team All-American
