= 1996–97 Stanford Cardinal men's basketball team =

American college basketball season

1996–97 Stanford Cardinal men's basketball

NCAA tournament, Sweet Sixteen
- Conference: Pacific-10 Conference

Ranking
- Coaches: No. 12
- AP: No. 21
- Record: 22–8 (12–6 Pac-10)
- Head coach: Mike Montgomery (11th season)
- Assistant coaches: Doug Oliver; Trent Johnson
- Home arena: Maples Pavilion (Capacity: 7,392)

1996–97 Pacific-10 Conference men's basketball standings
	Conf.				Overall
Team	W		L	PCT	W		L	PCT
No. 7 UCLA	15	–	3	.833	24	–	8	.750
No. 21 Stanford	12	–	6	.667	22	–	8	.733
California	12	–	6	.667	23	–	9	.719
USC	12	–	6	.667	17	–	11	.607
No. 15 Arizona	11	–	7	.611	25	–	9	.735
Washington	10	–	8	.556	17	–	11	.607
Oregon	8	–	10	.444	17	–	11	.607
Washington State	5	–	13	.278	13	–	17	.433
Oregon State	3	–	15	.167	7	–	20	.259
Arizona State	2	–	16	.111	10	–	20	.333
Rankings from AP Poll

The 1996–97 Stanford Cardinal men's basketball team represented Stanford University as a member of the Pac-10 Conference during the 1996–97 NCAA Division I men's basketball season. The team was led by head coach Mike Montgomery and played their home games at Maples Pavilion. Stanford finished in a three-way tie for second in the Pac-10 regular season standings and received an at-large bid to the 1997 NCAA tournament. The Cardinal would reach the Sweet Sixteen by defeating No. 11 seed Oklahoma in the opening round and Tim Duncan-led No. 3 seed Wake Forest in the second round. The season came to and end after an overtime loss to No. 2 seed Utah in the West Regional semifinals. Stanford finished with an overall record of 22–8 (12–6 Pac-10).

== Roster ==
1996–97 Stanford Cardinal men's basketball team
Players
Coaches

Pos.	#	Name	Height	Weight	Year	Previous school	Hometown
G	3	Kris Weems	6 ft 2 in (1.88 m)	—	So		Kansas City, KS
F	5	Peter Sauer	6 ft 7 in (2.01 m)	—	So		Pittsburgh, PA
	10	Mark Thompson (redshirt)	—	—	So		Los Angeles, CA
G	11	Arthur Lee	6 ft 1 in (1.85 m)	—	So		Los Angeles, CA
G	21	David Moseley	6 ft 4 in (1.93 m)	—	Fr		Las Cruces, NM
G	22	Brevin Knight	5 ft 10 in (1.78 m)	170 lb (77 kg)	Sr	Seton Hall Prep	Livingston, NJ
F	24	Rich Jackson	6 ft 6 in (1.98 m)	—	Sr		Provo, UT
G	30	Johannes Burge	6 ft 3 in (1.91 m)	—	Fr
F	32	Ryan Mendez	6 ft 7 in (2.01 m)	—	Fr		Burleson, TX
F	34	Karl Wente	6 ft 7 in (2.01 m)	—	So
G	35	Kamba Tshionyi	6 ft 2 in (1.88 m)	—	Jr		Eugene, OR
F	40	Pete Van Elswyk	6 ft 9 in (2.06 m)	—	Jr		Hamilton, CAN
F	44	Mark Seaton	6 ft 9 in (2.06 m)	—	So		Cypress, CA
F	45	Mark Madsen	6 ft 9 in (2.06 m)	235 lb (107 kg)	Fr	San Ramon Valley High School	Danville, CA
F	50	Mark Mathiesen	6 ft 7 in (2.01 m)	—			Los Altos, CA
C	55	Tim Young	7 ft 0 in (2.13 m)	220 lb (100 kg)	So	Harbor	Santa Cruz, CA

Head coach

- Mike Montgomery (Long Beach State)

Assistant coach(es)

- Doug Oliver (San José State)
- Trent Johnson (Boise State)

Legend

- (C) Team captain
- (S) Suspended
- (I) Ineligible
- (W) Walk-on
- Injured
- Current redshirt

Roster

== Schedule and results ==
Date time, TV	Rank^{#}	Opponent^{#}	Result	Record	Site (attendance) city, state
Regular season
Nov 27, 1996*	No. 21	vs. UNC Greensboro; Great Alaska Shootout	W 88–52	1–0	Sullivan Arena; Anchorage, Alaska
Nov 29, 1996*	No. 21	vs. College of Charleston; Great Alaska Shootout	L 78–82	1–1	Sullivan Arena; Anchorage, Alaska
Nov 30, 1996	No. 21	at Alaska-Anchorage; Great Alaska Shootout	W 91–69	2–1	Sullivan Arena; Anchorage, Alaska
Dec 7, 1996*	No. 24	vs. Manhattan	W 81–59	3–1	ARCO Arena; Sacramento, California
Dec 14, 1996*	No. 21	at San Diego	W 72–70	4–1	USD Sports Center; San Diego, California
Dec 18, 1996	No. 22	Alaska-Anchorage	W 105–70	5–1	Maples Pavilion; Stanford, California
Dec 22, 1996*	No. 22	at Seton Hall	W 83–81 ^{OT}	6–1	Continental Airlines Arena; East Rutherford, New Jersey
Dec 28, 1996*	No. 23	Navy	W 85–68	7–1	Maples Pavilion; Stanford, California
Jan 2, 1997	No. 21	at Arizona State	W 81–65	8–1 (1–0)	ASU Activity Center; Tempe, Arizona
Jan 4, 1997	No. 21	at No. 9 Arizona	L 75–76	8–2 (1–1)	McKale Center; Tucson, Arizona
Jan 9, 1997	No. 21	UCLA	W 109–61	9–2 (2–1)	Maples Pavilion; Stanford, California
Jan 11, 1997	No. 21	USC	W 85–70	10–2 (3–1)	Maples Pavilion; Stanford, California
Jan 16, 1997	No. 15	at No. 24 Oregon	W 72–69 ^{OT}	11–2 (4–1)	McArthur Court; Eugene, Oregon
Jan 18, 1997	No. 15	at Oregon State	L 77–86	11–3 (4–2)	Gill Coliseum; Corvallis, Oregon
Jan 23, 1997	No. 17	Washington	W 78–67	12–3 (5–2)	Maples Pavilion; Stanford, California
Jan 25, 1997	No. 17	Washington State	W 81–61	13–3 (6–2)	Maples Pavilion; Stanford, California
Jan 29, 1997	No. 15	at California	L 64–70	13–4 (6–3)	Harmon Gym; Berkeley, California
Feb 6, 1997	No. 18	at USC	L 81–84	13–5 (6–4)	L.A. Sports Arena; Los Angeles, California
Feb 8, 1997	No. 18	at UCLA	L 68–87	13–6 (6–5)	Pauley Pavilion; Los Angeles, California
Feb 13, 1997	No. 22	Oregon State	W 87–54	14–6 (7–5)	Maples Pavilion; Stanford, California
Feb 15, 1997	No. 22	Oregon	W 83–61	15–6 (8–5)	Maples Pavilion; Stanford, California
Feb 20, 1997	No. 20	at Washington State	W 76–63	16–6 (9–5)	Friel Court; Pullman, Washington
Feb 22, 1997	No. 20	at Washington	L 61–75	16–7 (9–6)	Bank of America Arena; Seattle, Washington
Feb 24, 1997*	No. 25	San Diego State	W 97–50	17–7	Maples Pavilion; Stanford, California
Mar 1, 1997	No. 25	California	W 73–63	18–7 (10–6)	Maples Pavilion; Stanford, California
Mar 6, 1997	No. 23	No. 12 Arizona	W 81–80	19–7 (11–6)	Maples Pavilion; Stanford, California
Mar 8, 1997	No. 23	Arizona State	W 86–63	20–7 (12–6)	Maples Pavilion; Stanford, California
NCAA tournament
Mar 14, 1997*	(6 W) No. 21	vs. (11 W) Oklahoma; First round	W 80–67	21–7	McKale Center; Tucson, Arizona
Mar 16, 1997*	(6 W) No. 21	vs. (3 W) No. 9 Wake Forest; Second Round	W 72–66	22–7	McKale Center; Tucson, Arizona
Mar 20, 1997*	(6 W) No. 21	vs. (2 W) No. 2 Utah; West Regional semifinal – Sweet Sixteen	L 77–82 ^{OT}	22–8	San Jose Arena; San Jose, California
*Non-conference game. ^{#}Rankings from AP Poll. (#) Tournament seedings in parentheses. W=West. All times are in Pacific Time. (#) during NCAA is seed within region.

Schedule Source:

== Rankings ==
Ranking movements Legend: ██ Increase in ranking ██ Decrease in ranking
	Week																		
Poll	Pre	1	2	3	4	5	6	7	8	9	10	11	12	13	14	15	16	17	Final
AP	18	20	21	24	21	22	23	21	21	15	17	15	18	22	20	25	23	21	Not released
Coaches	14	14^	14	21	18	20	20	20	22	17	17	15	16	22	22	24	22	21	12

*AP does not release post-NCAA Tournament rankings
^Coaches did not release a week 2 poll

== 1997 NBA draft ==
Round	Pick	Player	NBA Team
1	16	Brevin Knight	Cleveland Cavaliers
