= 1996–97 George Mason Patriots men's basketball team =

American college basketball season

1996–97 George Mason Patriots men's basketball
- Conference: Colonial Athletic Association
- Record: 10–17 (4–12 CAA)
- Head coach: Paul Westhead (4th season)
- Home arena: Patriot Center

1996–97 CAA men's basketball standings
	Conf.				Overall
Team	W		L	PCT	W		L	PCT
Old Dominion †	10	–	6	.625	22	–	11	.667
UNC Wilmington	10	–	6	.625	16	–	14	.533
East Carolina	9	–	7	.563	17	–	10	.630
VCU	9	–	7	.563	14	–	13	.519
William & Mary	8	–	8	.500	12	–	16	.429
James Madison	8	–	8	.500	16	–	13	.552
American	7	–	9	.438	11	–	16	.407
Richmond	7	–	9	.438	13	–	15	.464
George Mason	4	–	12	.250	10	–	17	.370
† 1997 CAA tournament winner Rankings from AP poll

The 1996–97 George Mason Patriots Men's basketball team represented George Mason University during the 1996–97 NCAA Division I men's basketball season. This was the 31st season for the program, the fourth and final under head coach Paul Westhead. The Patriots played their home games at the Patriot Center in Fairfax, Virginia.

In the CAA tournament, the Patriots lost to Richmond in the first round.

== Honors and awards ==
Colonial Athletic Association All-Conference Team

- Nate Langley

Colonial Athletic Association All-Rookie Team

- Ahmad Dorsett

Colonial Athletic Association All-Defensive Team

- Nate Langley

== Player statistics ==
Player	GP	FG%	3FG%	FT%	RPG	APG	SPG	BPG	PPG
Nate Langley	27	.428	.299	.669	4.9	2.4	3.0	0.4	20.9
Demetrius Somerville	10	.444	.425	.833	1.7	1.6	0.8	0.2	12.6
George Redd	27	.441	.293	.675	7.4	0.9	1.3	0.1	11.8
Avery Carey	27	.449	.338	.698	4.9	1.3	1.0	0.4	11.1
Contrell Scott	27	.388	.266	.745	2.9	4.7	1.9	0.2	9.9
Nik Mirich	26	.429	.235	.627	5.5	1.0	0.6	0.8	5.2
Kevin Ward	23	.404	.750	.704	3.6	4.8	0.3	0.0	4.8
Ahmad Dorsett	27	.379	.191	.556	1.5	0.9	0.9	0.1	4.6
Bernard Wanjara	24	.486	.000	.611	4.5	0.2	0.4	0.3	3.8
Leighton Henry	24	.375	.240	.385	1.5	0.3	0.3	0.1	2.0
Lee Brown	20	.341	.182	.700	0.4	0.8	0.4	0.0	1.9
Michael Sharp	25	.423	.000	.385	2.2	0.1	0.4	0.4	1.1
Shawn Woods	4	.500	.000	1.000	0.5	0.0	0.3	0.0	1.0

== Schedule and results ==
Date time, TV	Rank^{#}	Opponent^{#}	Result	Record	Site city, state
Non-conference regular season
November 23, 1996*		Alabama State	W 97–66	1–0	Patriot Center; Fairfax, VA
November 30, 1996*		Virginia	L 93–106	1–1	Patriot Center; Fairfax, VA
December 3, 1996*		Morehead State	W 107–98	2–1	Patriot Center; Fairfax, VA
December 7, 1996*		Colorado	W 85–81	3–1	Patriot Center (2,481); Fairfax, VA
December 10, 1996*		at Long Beach State	W 78–70	4–1	The Pyramid; Long Beach, CA
December 14, 1996*		at Ohio State	L 72–102	4–2	St. John Arena; Columbus, OH
December 20, 1996*		St. Francis (PA)	W 96–95	5–2	Patriot Center; Fairfax, VA
December 29, 1996*		at Akron	L 86–99	5–3	James A. Rhodes Arena; Akron, OH
CAA regular season
January 2, 1997		VCU; Rivalry	L 70–75	5–4 (0–1)	Patriot Center; Fairfax, VA
January 4, 1997		at UNC Wilmington	W 63–59	6–4 (1–1)	Trask Coliseum; Wilmington, NC
January 6, 1997		at East Carolina	L 74–80	6–5 (1–2)	Minges Coliseum; Greenville, NC
January 8, 1997		Old Dominion	L 85–94	6–6 (1–3)	Patriot Center; Fairfax, VA
January 13, 1997		at James Madison	L 80–85	6–7 (1–4)	JMU Convocation Center; Harrisonburg, VA
January 15, 1997		Richmond	W 98–86 ^{OT}	7–7 (2–4)	Patriot Center; Fairfax, VA
January 18, 1997		at American	L 75–84	7–8 (2–5)	Bender Arena; Washington, DC
January 25, 1997		William & Mary	W 70–67	8–8 (3–5)	Patriot Center; Fairfax, VA
January 29, 1997		at VCU; Rivalry	L 77–90	8–9 (3–6)	Richmond Coliseum; Richmond, VA
February 1, 1997		East Carolina	L 81–85	8–10 (3–7)	Patriot Center; Fairfax, VA
February 3, 1997		UNC Wilmington	L 61–81	8–11 (3–8)	Patriot Center; Fairfax, VA
February 5, 1997		at Richmond	L 69–86	8–12 (3–9)	Robins Center; Richmond, VA
February 8, 1997		James Madison	L 63–67	8–13 (3–10)	Patriot Center; Fairfax, VA
February 12, 1997*		at Alabama State	L 79–81	8–14	Dunn–Oliver Acadome; Montgomery, AL
February 15, 1997		William & Mary	L 85–89	8–15 (3–11)	William & Mary Hall; Williamsburg, VA
February 22, 1997		at Old Dominion	L 62–85	8–16 (3–12)	ODU Fieldhouse; Norfolk, VA
February 25, 1997		American	W 79–70	9–17 (4–12)	Patriot Center; Fairfax, VA
1997 CAA tournament
February 28, 1997	(9)	vs. (8) Richmond; First Round	L 57–85	9–18	Richmond Coliseum; Richmond, VA
*Non-conference game. ^{#}Rankings from AP Poll. (#) Tournament seedings in parentheses. All times are in Eastern Time.
