= 1996–97 UCLA Bruins men's basketball team =

American college basketball season

1996–97 UCLA Bruins men's basketball

Pac-10 regular season champions

NCAA tournament, Elite Eight
- Conference: Pacific-10

Ranking
- Coaches: No. 7
- AP: No. 7
- Record: 24–8 (15–3 Pac-10)
- Head coach: Steve Lavin (1st season)
- Assistant coaches: Michael Holton; Jim Saia; Steve Spencer
- Home arena: Pauley Pavilion

1996–97 Pacific-10 Conference men's basketball standings
	Conf.				Overall
Team	W		L	PCT	W		L	PCT
No. 7 UCLA	15	–	3	.833	24	–	8	.750
No. 21 Stanford	12	–	6	.667	22	–	8	.733
California	12	–	6	.667	23	–	9	.719
USC	12	–	6	.667	17	–	11	.607
No. 15 Arizona	11	–	7	.611	25	–	9	.735
Washington	10	–	8	.556	17	–	11	.607
Oregon	8	–	10	.444	17	–	11	.607
Washington State	5	–	13	.278	13	–	17	.433
Oregon State	3	–	15	.167	7	–	20	.259
Arizona State	2	–	16	.111	10	–	20	.333
Rankings from AP Poll

The 1996–97 UCLA Bruins men's basketball team represented the University of California, Los Angeles in the 1996–97 NCAA Division I men's basketball season. Under new head coach, Steve Lavin, the Bruins began the season ranked 5th in the AP Poll, but after an overtime loss in the opener to Tulsa, the Bruins dropped and would not be ranked as high for the rest of the season. On January 18 the Bruins beat #6 Arizona, 84–78 in overtime. The team finished 1st in the conference. The Bruins competed in the 1997 NCAA Division I men's basketball tournament, losing to the Minnesota Golden Gophers in the Elite Eight. This was the first season for head coach Steve Lavin, who had been an assistant coach under Jim Harrick.

== Roster ==
1996–97 UCLA Bruins men's basketball team
Players
Coaches

Pos.	#	Name	Height	Weight	Year	Hometown
G	12	Toby Bailey	6 ft 5 in (1.96 m)	205 lb (93 kg)	Jr	Los Angeles, California
G	5	Cameron Dollar (C)	5 ft 11 in (1.8 m)	189 lb (86 kg)	Sr	Atlanta, Georgia
F	30	Sean Farnham	6 ft 6 in (1.98 m)	205 lb (93 kg)	Fr	Clayton, California
G	15	Matt Harbour	6 ft 1 in (1.85 m)	—	Fr
F	52	J. R. Henderson	6 ft 9 in (2.06 m)	223 lb (101 kg)	Jr	Bakersfield, California
G	54	Kris Johnson	6 ft 4 in (1.93 m)	222 lb (101 kg)	Jr	Los Angeles, California
G	20	Brandon Loyd	5 ft 10 in (1.78 m)	182 lb (83 kg)	So	Tulsa, Oklahoma
C	34	Jelani McCoy	6 ft 9 in (2.06 m)	220 lb (100 kg)	So	Oakland, California
G	30	Vince McGautha	5 ft 11 in (1.8 m)	—	Jr
F	24	Bob Myers	6 ft 7 in (2.01 m)	227 lb (103 kg)	Sr	Danville, California
F	13	Charles O'Bannon (C)	6 ft 5 in (1.96 m)	209 lb (95 kg)	Sr	Bellflower, California
C	50	Dave Parker	6 ft 8 in (2.03 m)	—	Fr
G	3	Harold Sylvester	5 ft 10 in (1.78 m)	—	Jr

Head coach

Steve Lavin (Chapman)

Assistant coach(es)

- Michael Holton (UCLA)
- Jim Saia (Chapman)
- Steve Spencer (Somona State)

Legend

- (C) Team captain
- (S) Suspended
- (I) Ineligible
- (W) Walk-on
- Injured
- Current redshirt

Roster
Last update: 30 January 2018

== Schedule ==
Date time, TV	Rank^{#}	Opponent^{#}	Result	Record	Site city, state
Exhibition
November 12, 1996		vs. Athletes in Action; Exhibition	W 114–79	0–0	Pauley Pavilion; Los Angeles, CA
November 14, 1996		vs. German 22 & under team Exhibition	W 71–44	0–0	Pauley Pavilion; Los Angeles, CA
Regular Season
November 21, 1996	No. 5	Tulsa; Preseason NIT	L 76–77 ^{OT}	0–1	Pauley Pavilion (8,589); Los Angeles, CA
December 3, 1996	No. 17	Cal State Northridge	W 95–73	1–1	Pauley Pavilion (7,427); Los Angeles, CA
December 7, 1996	No. 17	No. 1 Kansas	L 83–96	1–2	Pauley Pavilion (12,060); Los Angeles, CA
December 14, 1996	No. 23	Ohio	W 72–61	2–2	Pauley Pavilion (8,053); Los Angeles, CA
December 17, 1996	No. 24	Jackson State	W 93–67	3–2	Pauley Pavilion (6,442); Los Angeles, CA
December 21, 1996	No. 24	at Illinois	L 63–79	3–3	United Center (15,331); Chicago, IL
December 23, 1996	No. 24	at Saint Louis	W 64–57	4–3	Scottrade Center (17,911); St. Louis, MO
December 28, 1996		Morgan State	W 87–72	5–3	Pauley Pavilion (7,654); Los Angeles, CA
January 2, 1997		Washington State	W 84–56	6–3 (1–0)	Pauley Pavilion (8,350); Los Angeles, CA
January 4, 1997		Washington	W 79–70	7–3 (2–0)	Pauley Pavilion (9,584); Los Angeles, CA
January 9, 1997		at No. 21 Stanford	L 61–109	7–4 (2–1)	Maples Pavilion (7,391); Stanford, CA
January 11, 1997		at California	W 64–56	8–4 (3–1)	Cow Palace (11,054); Daly City, CA
January 16, 1997		Arizona State	W 79–62	9–4 (4–1)	Pauley Pavilion (10,067); Los Angeles, CA
January 18, 1997		No. 6 Arizona	W 84–78 ^{OT}	10–4 (5–1)	Pauley Pavilion (11,286); Los Angeles, CA
January 23, 1997		at USC	W 96–87	11–4 (6–1)	Los Angeles Memorial Sports Arena (12,843); Los Angeles, CA
January 25, 1997		at No. 6 Louisville	L 71–74	11–5	Freedom Hall (20,043); Louisville, KY
January 30, 1997		at Oregon	L 85–87 ^{OT}	11–6 (6–2)	McArthur Court (10,024); Eugene, OR
February 1, 1997		at Oregon State	W 74–68	12–6 (7–2)	Gill Coliseum (837); Corvallis, OR
February 6, 1997		California	L 68–71	12–7 (7–3)	Pauley Pavilion (11,701); Los Angeles, CA
February 8, 1997		No. 18 Stanford	W 87–68	13–7 (8–3)	Pauley Pavilion (12,378); Los Angeles, CA
February 13, 1997	No. 24	at No. 11 Arizona	W 66–64	14–7 (9–3)	McKale Center (14,474); Tucson, AZ
February 15, 1997	No. 24	at Arizona State	W 92–81	15–7 (10–3)	ASU Activity Center (4,823); Tempe, AZ
February 19, 1997	No. 17	USC	W 82–60	16–7 (11–3)	Pauley Pavilion (13,382); Los Angeles, CA
February 23, 1997	No. 17	No. 6 Duke	W 73–69	17–7	Pauley Pavilion (13,478); Los Angeles, CA
February 27, 1997	No. 10	Oregon State	W 81–69	18–7 (12–3)	Pauley Pavilion (11,048); Los Angeles, CA
March 01, 1997	No. 10	Oregon	W 74–67	19–7 (13–3)	Pauley Pavilion (12,341); Los Angeles, CA
March 06, 1997	No. 9	at Washington	W 87–85	20–7 (14–3)	Hec Edmundson Pavilion (7,836); Seattle, WA
March 08, 1997	No. 9	at Washington State	W 87–86	21–7 (15–3)	Beasley Coliseum (7,926); Pullman, WA
NCAA tournament
March 13, 1997	No. 7	vs. Charleston Southern; First Round	W 109–75	22–7	The Palace of Auburn Hills (21,020); Auburn Hills, MI
March 15, 1997	No. 7	vs. No. 13 Xavier; Second Round	W 96–83	23–7	The Palace of Auburn Hills (21,020); Auburn Hills, MI
March 20, 1997	No. 7	vs. No. 18 Iowa State; Sweet Sixteen	W 74–73 ^{OT}	24–7	Alamodome (29,231); San Antonio, TX
March 22, 1997	No. 7	vs. No. 3 Minnesota; Elite Eight	L 72–80	24–8	Alamodome (31,930); San Antonio, TX
*Non-conference game. ^{#}Rankings from AP Poll. (#) Tournament seedings in parentheses. All times are in Pacific Time.
