= 1996–97 Tulsa Golden Hurricane men's basketball team =

American college basketball season

1996–97 Tulsa Golden Hurricane men's basketball

NCAA tournament, Second round
- Conference: Western Athletic Conference
- Mountain
- Record: 24–10 (12–4 WAC)
- Head coach: Steve Robinson (2nd season)
- Assistant coaches: Coleman Crawford (2nd season); Jim Platt (3rd season)
- Home arena: Tulsa Convention Center

1996–97 WAC men's basketball standings
	Conf.				Overall
Team	W		L	PCT	W		L	PCT
Mountain
No. 2 Utah †	15	–	1	.938	29	–	4	.879
Tulsa	12	–	4	.750	24	–	10	.706
No. 11 New Mexico	11	–	5	.688	25	–	8	.758
TCU	7	–	9	.438	22	–	13	.629
SMU	7	–	9	.438	16	–	12	.571
Rice	6	–	10	.375	12	–	15	.444
UTEP	6	–	10	.375	13	–	13	.500
BYU	0	–	16	.000	1	–	25	.038
Pacific
Fresno State	12	–	4	.750	20	–	12	.625
Hawaii	12	–	4	.750	21	–	8	.724
UNLV	11	–	5	.688	22	–	10	.688
Colorado State	10	–	6	.625	20	–	9	.690
Wyoming	8	–	8	.500	12	–	16	.429
San Jose State	5	–	11	.313	13	–	14	.481
San Diego State	4	–	12	.250	12	–	15	.444
Air Force	2	–	14	.125	7	–	19	.269
† 1997 WAC tournament winner Rankings from AP poll

The 1996–97 Tulsa Golden Hurricane men's basketball team represented the University of Tulsa as a member of the Western Athletic Conference (WAC) during the 1996–97 college basketball season. The Golden Hurricane played their home games at the Tulsa Convention Center. Led by head coach Steve Robinson, they finished the season 24–10 overall and 12–4 in conference play to finish second in the WAC Mountain division standings. After losing in the championship game of the WAC tournament, the team defeated Boston University in the opening round of the NCAA tournament, before falling to No. 4 seed Clemson in the round of 32.

== Roster ==
1996–97 Tulsa Golden Hurricane men's basketball team
Players
Coaches

Pos.	#	Name	Height	Weight	Year	Hometown
G	21	Shea Seals	6 ft 5 in (1.96 m)	200 lb (91 kg)	Sr	Tulsa, Oklahoma
F/C	51	Michael Ruffin	6 ft 9 in (2.06 m)	235 lb (107 kg)	So	Denver, Colorado

Head coach

Steve Robinson

Assistant coach(es)

- Coleman Crawford (North Alabama)
- Jim Platt (Concordia (IL))

Legend

- (C) Team captain
- (S) Suspended
- (I) Ineligible
- (W) Walk-on
- Injured
- Current redshirt

== Schedule and results ==
Date time, TV	Rank^{#}	Opponent^{#}	Result	Record	Site (attendance) city, state
Regular season
Nov 20, 1996*		at No. 5 UCLA; Preseason NIT	W 77–76 ^{OT}	1–0	Pauley Pavilion (8,589); Los Angeles, California
Nov 22, 1996*		Oklahoma State; Preseason NIT	W 72–54	2–0	Tulsa Convention Center (8,367); Tulsa, Oklahoma
Nov 27, 1996*	No. 22	vs. No. 6 Duke; Preseason NIT	L 67–72	2–1	Madison Square Garden (10,000); New York, New York
Nov 29, 1996*	No. 22	vs. Evansville; Preseason NIT	W 55–51	3–1	Madison Square Garden (10,000); New York, New York
Dec 2, 1996*	No. 21	Delaware State	W 79–50	4–1	Tulsa Convention Center (6,116); Tulsa, Oklahoma
Dec 4, 1996*	No. 21	at Houston	L 77–79 ^{2OT}	4–2	Hofheinz Pavilion (2,865); Houston, Texas
Dec 7, 1996*		vs. Saint Joseph's	L 64–67	4–3	Boardwalk Hall (7,777); Atlantic City, New Jersey
Dec 14, 1996*		Temple	W 67–60	5–3	Tulsa Convention Center (7,085); Tulsa, Oklahoma
Dec 19, 1996*		at Wichita State	W 56–53	6–3	Levitt Arena (10,545); Wichita, Kansas
Dec 27, 1996*		vs. Southwest Texas State; All-College Tournament	W 76–60	7–3	Myriad Convention Center (7,120); Oklahoma City, Oklahoma
Dec 28, 1996*		vs. Oklahoma; All-College Tournament	W 78–75	8–3	Myriad Convention Center (12,569); Oklahoma City, Oklahoma
WAC Tournament
Mar 6, 1997*		at UNLV; Quarterfinals	W 68–65	23–8	Thomas & Mack Center (11,459); Las Vegas, Nevada
Mar 7, 1997*		vs. TCU; Semifinals	L 59–64	23–9	Thomas & Mack Center; Las Vegas, Nevada
NCAA Tournament
Mar 14, 1997*	(5 MW)	vs. (12 MW) Boston University; First round	W 81–52	24–9	Kemper Arena (12,160); Kansas City, Missouri
Mar 16, 1997*	(5 MW)	vs. (4 MW) No. 14 Clemson; Second round	L 59–65	24–10	Kemper Arena (14,750); Kansas City, Missouri
*Non-conference game. ^{#}Rankings from AP poll. (#) Tournament seedings in parentheses. MW=Midwest. All times are in Central.

== Awards and honors ==
- Shea Seals – Third-team All-American, First-team All-WAC
