= 1996–97 Louisville Cardinals men's basketball team =

American college basketball season

1996–97 Louisville Cardinals men's basketball

Big Island Invitational Champions

NCAA tournament, Elite Eight
- Conference: Conference USA

Ranking
- Coaches: No. 10
- AP: No. 25
- Record: 26–9 (9–5 CUSA)
- Head coach: Denny Crum (26th season)
- Assistant coaches: Scooter McCray (9th season); Jerry Eaves (1st season); Scott Davenport (1st season)
- Home arena: Freedom Hall

1996–97 Conference USA men's basketball standings
	Conf.				Overall
Team	W		L	PCT	W		L	PCT
Blue
No. 10 Cincinnati	12	–	2	.857	26	–	8	.765
Marquette †	9	–	5	.643	22	–	9	.710
Saint Louis	4	–	10	.286	11	–	18	.379
DePaul	1	–	13	.071	3	–	23	.115
Red
Tulane	11	–	3	.786	20	–	11	.645
UAB	7	–	7	.500	18	–	14	.563
Southern Miss	6	–	8	.429	12	–	15	.444
South Florida	2	–	12	.143	8	–	19	.296
White
UNC Charlotte	10	–	4	.714	22	–	9	.710
Memphis	10	–	4	.714	16	–	15	.516
No. 25 Louisville	9	–	5	.643	26	–	9	.743
Houston	3	–	11	.214	11	–	16	.407
† 1997 Conference USA Tournament winner Rankings from AP Poll

The 1996–97 Louisville Cardinals men's basketball team represented the University of Louisville in the 1996–97 NCAA Division I men's basketball season. The head coach was Denny Crum and the team finished the season with an overall record of 26–9.

== Roster ==
1996–97 Louisville Cardinals men's basketball team
Players
Coaches

Pos.	#	Name	Height	Weight	Year	Previous school	Hometown
G	12	Matt Akridge	6 ft 2 in (1.88 m)	180 lb (82 kg)	Jr	TCU; Eastern H.S.	Louisville, Kentucky
F	30	Damion Dantzler	6 ft 7 in (2.01 m)	225 lb (102 kg)	Jr	Westinghouse Prep	Chicago, Illinois
G/F	24	Craig Farmer	6 ft 5 in (1.96 m)	195 lb (88 kg)	Jr	Cairo Senior High	Cairo, Illinois
G	13	B.J. Flynn	6 ft 2 in (1.88 m)	185 lb (84 kg)	Sr	Jeffersonville H.S.	Jeffersonville, Indiana
G/F	23	Eric Johnson	6 ft 3 in (1.91 m)	225 lb (102 kg)	So	Woodward	Cincinnati, Ohio
G	4	Jerry Johnson	6 ft 3 in (1.91 m)	220 lb (100 kg)	Fr	Master's Christian Academy	Atlanta, Georgia
F	21	Nate Johnson	6 ft 6 in (1.98 m)	205 lb (93 kg)	Fr	Camden H.S.	Camden, New Jersey
G	25	Jeff McKinley	6 ft 5 in (1.96 m)	205 lb (93 kg)	Fr	Simon Kenton	Independence, Kentucky
F/C	44	Alex Sanders	6 ft 7 in (2.01 m)	260 lb (118 kg)	So	Oak Hill Academy	Houston, Texas
G/F	5	Alvin Sims	6 ft 4 in (1.93 m)	235 lb (107 kg)	Sr	Paris H.S.	Paris, Kentucky
F/C	33	Beau Zach Smith	6 ft 8 in (2.03 m)	250 lb (113 kg)	Sr	Peoria H.S.	Peoria, Illinois
G	32	DeJuan Wheat	6 ft 0 in (1.83 m)	165 lb (75 kg)	Sr	Ballard	Louisville, Kentucky
G/F	3	Tony Williams	6 ft 7 in (2.01 m)	190 lb (86 kg)	Fr	Doss	Louisville, Kentucky
F	20	Paul Yaden	6 ft 7 in (2.01 m)	170 lb (77 kg)	Fr	DeSales	Louisville, Kentucky

Head coach

- Denny Crum (UCLA)

Assistant coach(es)

- Scooter McCray (Louisville)
- Jerry Eaves (Louisville)
- Scott Davenport (Louisville)

Legend

- (C) Team captain
- (S) Suspended
- (I) Ineligible
- (W) Walk-on
- Injured
- Current redshirt

== Schedule and results ==
Date time, TV	Rank^{#}	Opponent^{#}	Result	Record	Site city, state
Regular Season
Nov 29, 1996*		vs. Montana State; Big Island Invitational – Quarterfinals	W 92–78	1–0	Afook-Chinen Civic Auditorium; Hilo, Hawai'i
Nov 30, 1996*		vs. Illinois; Big Island Invitational – Semifinals	W 70–60	2–0	Afook-Chinen Civic Auditorium; Hilo, Hawai'i
Dec 1, 1996*		vs. Colorado; Big Island Invitational – Championship Game	W 92–82	3–0	Afook-Chinen Civic Auditorium; Hilo, Hawai'i
Dec 7, 1996*		vs. LSU	W 93–87 ^{OT}	4–0	Arrowhead Pond; Anaheim, California
Dec 11, 1996*	No. 22	Dayton	W 80–67	5–0	Freedom Hall; Louisville, Kentucky
Dec 14, 1996*	No. 22	vs. Purdue	W 88–72	6–0	Market Square Arena; Indianapolis, Indiana
Dec 16, 1996*	No. 18	Wright State	W 65–57	7–0	Freedom Hall; Louisville, Kentucky
Dec 21, 1997*	No. 18	at No. 19 Arkansas	W 91–88 ^{OT}	8–0	Bud Walton Arena; Fayetteville, Arkansas
Dec 23, 1996*	No. 16	Tennessee State	W 102–54	9–0	Freedom Hall; Louisville, Kentucky
Dec 29, 1996*	No. 16	No. 25 Boston College	W 89–85 ^{2OT}	10–0	Freedom Hall; Louisville, Kentucky
Dec 31, 1996*	No. 14	No. 3 Kentucky	L 54–74	10–1	Freedom Hall; Louisville, Kentucky
Jan 3, 1997	No. 14	at UAB	W 93–79	11–1 (1–0)	Bartow Arena; Birmingham, Alabama
Jan 6, 1997	No. 14	at Charlotte	W 92–81	12–1 (2–0)	Halton Arena; Charlotte, North Carolina
Jan 11, 1997*	No. 10	Georgia Tech	W 60–56	13–1	Freedom Hall; Louisville, Kentucky
Jan 15, 1997	No. 10	Houston	W 92–78	14–1 (3–0)	Freedom Hall; Louisville, Kentucky
Jan 19, 1997*	No. 10	at No. 23 Texas	W 85–78 ^{OT}	15–1	Frank Erwin Center; Austin, Texas
Jan 23, 1997	No. 6	Memphis	L 58–64	15–2 (3–1)	Freedom Hall; Louisville, Kentucky
Jan 25, 1997*	No. 6	UCLA	W 74–71	16–2	Freedom Hall; Louisville, Kentucky
Jan 28, 1997	No. 9	DePaul	W 71–54	17–2 (4–1)	Freedom Hall; Louisville, Kentucky
Jan 30, 1997	No. 9	No. 8 Cincinnati	W 81–70	18–2 (5–1)	Freedom Hall; Louisville, Kentucky
Feb 2, 1997*	No. 9	at Temple	L 44–67	18–3	McGonigle Hall; Philadelphia, Pennsylvania
Feb 6, 1997	No. 11	St. Louis	L 62–64	18–4 (5–2)	Freedom Hall; Louisville, Kentucky
Feb 9, 1997	No. 11	at Memphis	L 59–79	18–5 (5–3)	The Pyramid; Memphis, Tennessee
Feb 15, 1997	No. 17	at Houston	W 70–66	19–5 (6–3)	Hofheinz Pavilion; Houston, Texas
Feb 17, 1997	No. 15	South Florida	W 75–64	20–5 (7–3)	Freedom Hall; Louisville, Kentucky
Feb 20, 1997	No. 15	at Marquette	L 71–79 ^{OT}	20–6 (7–4)	Bradley Center; Milwaukee, Wisconsin
Feb 22, 1997	No. 15	at Southern Miss	W 75–72 ^{OT}	21–6 (8–4)	Reed Green Coliseum; Hattiesburg, Mississippi
Feb 26, 1997	No. 17	Charlotte	W 72–71	22–6 (9–4)	Freedom Hall; Louisville, Kentucky
Mar 1, 1997	No. 17	at Tulane	L 71–83	22–7 (9–5)	Fogelman Arena; New Orleans, Louisiana
Conference USA Tournament
Mar 5, 1997	(6) No. 20	vs. (11) South Florida; First Round	W 69–58	23–7	Kiel Center; St. Louis, Missouri
Mar 6, 1997	(6) No. 20	vs. (3) Charlotte; Quarterfinals	L 60–64	23–8	Kiel Center; St. Louis, Missouri
NCAA Tournament
Mar 14, 1997*	(6 E) No. 25	vs. (11 E) UMass; First Round	W 65–57	24–8	Civic Arena; Pittsburgh, Pennsylvania
Mar 16, 1997*	(6 E) No. 25	vs. (3 E) No. 11 New Mexico; Second Round	W 64–63	25–8	Civic Arena; Pittsburgh, Pennsylvania
Mar 21, 1997*	(6 E) No. 25	vs. (10 E) Texas; Sweet Sixteen	W 78–63	26–8	Carrier Dome; Syracuse, New York
Mar 23, 1997*	(6 E) No. 25	vs. (1 E) No. 4 North Carolina; Elite Eight	L 74–97	26–9	Carrier Dome; Syracuse, New York
*Non-conference game. ^{#}Rankings from AP Poll. (#) Tournament seedings in parentheses.
