= Jeff Capel II =

American basketball player and coach

Personal information
- Born: January 6, 1953 Southern Pines, North Carolina, U.S.
- Died: November 13, 2017 (aged 64)

Career information
- High school: Pinecrest (Southern Pines, North Carolina)
- College: Fayetteville State (1970–1971, 1976–1977)
- Coaching career: 1980–2013

Career history

Coaching
- 1980–1986: Pinecrest HS
- 1986–1989: Wake Forest (assistant)
- 1989–1993: Fayetteville State
- 1993–1994: North Carolina A&T
- 1994–2001: Old Dominion
- 2001–2004: Fayetteville Patriots
- 2004–2011: Charlotte Bobcats (assistant)
- 2011–2013: Philadelphia 76ers (assistant)

Career highlights
- MEAC tournament champion (1994); 2x CAA regular season champion (1995, 1997); 2x CAA tournament champion (1995, 1997); CAA Coach of the Year (1995)

Felton Jeffrey Capel II (January 6, 1953 – November 13, 2017) was an American National Basketball Association assistant coach, and, prior to that, a college basketball head coach. He was the father of fellow coaches Jeff Capel III and Jason Capel.

== Early life ==
Born in Southern Pines, North Carolina, Capel graduated from Pinecrest High School in 1970. He went to Fayetteville State University and played on the basketball team as a freshman, then served in the United States Army from 1971 to 1975. Capel says that serving in the Army provided discipline and structure in his life. Capel returned to Fayetteville State and played another season on the basketball team as a senior before graduating in 1977 with a degree in health and physical education.

== Coaching career ==
=== Pinecrest High School (1980–1986) ===
In 1978, Capel returned to his alma mater Pinecrest High School to be a volunteer basketball coach. He also coached wrestling, baseball, and junior varsity football at Pinecrest. He then was the head varsity basketball coach from 1980 to 1986. Capel also was an assistant principal at Pinecrest.

=== Wake Forest (1986–1989) ===
From 1986 to 1989, Capel was an assistant coach at Wake Forest University under Bob Staak.

=== Fayetteville State (1989–1993) ===
Fayetteville State hired Capel as head coach in 1989. In four seasons (1989–1993), Capel had a 63–51 record at Fayetteville State, with berths in the 1991 CIAA basketball tournament semi-finals and 1992 NCAA Division II tournament. Future NBA player Darrell Armstrong was among players Capel coached.

=== North Carolina A&T (1993–1994) ===
In the 1993–94 season, Capel was head coach at North Carolina A&T, who finished 16–14 with the MEAC tournament championship and automatic berth in the NCAA tournament.

=== Old Dominion (1994–2001) ===
Capel then was head coach at Old Dominion from 1994 to 2001. Under Capel, Old Dominion won two CAA tournament championships (1995 and 1997). Old Dominion made the second round of the 1995 NCAA tournament and first round of the 1997 NCAA tournament, as well as the second round of the 1999 National Invitation Tournament. At Old Dominion, Capel had a 122–98 record.

=== NBA (2001–2013) ===
In 2001, the Fayetteville Patriots of the NBA's startup minor league National Basketball Development League (NBDL) hired Capel as head coach. Capel was head coach from 2001 to 2004; the Patriots finished first in the NBDL for the 2002–03 season and were runners-up in the 2003 NBDL Finals.

Capel then served as an assistant coach for the NBA's Charlotte Bobcats from 2004 to 2011. On November 15, 2011, it was announced that Capel was hired as an assistant coach for the Philadelphia 76ers, a position which he held until 2013.

== Illness and death ==
On January 25, 2017, writing in The Players' Tribune, his son Jeff Capel III disclosed that Capel had been diagnosed in 2014 with amyotrophic lateral sclerosis. He died on November 13, 2017, from the disease.

== Head coaching record ==
=== College ===
Record table
Season	Team	Overall	Conference	Standing	Postseason
Fayetteville State Broncos (Central Intercollegiate Athletic Conference) (1989–1993)
1989–90	Fayetteville State	7–21			
1990–91	Fayetteville State	14–13	10–9		
1991–92	Fayetteville State	22–8			
1992–93	Fayetteville State	20–9	14–6	3rd	NCAA Division II First Round
Fayetteville State:		63–51			
North Carolina A&T Aggies (Mid-Eastern Athletic Conference) (1993–1994)
1993–94	North Carolina A&T	16–14	10–6	T–2nd	NCAA Division I First Round
North Carolina A&T:		16–14	10–6		
Old Dominion Monarchs (Colonial Athletic Association) (1994–2001)
1994–95	Old Dominion	21–12	12–2	1st	NCAA Division I Second Round
1995–96	Old Dominion	18–13	12–4	2nd	
1996–97	Old Dominion	22–11	10–6	T–1st	NCAA Division I First Round
1997–98	Old Dominion	12–16	8–8	4th	
1998–99	Old Dominion	25–9	11–5	2nd	NIT Second Round
1999–00	Old Dominion	11–19	6–10	T–6th	
2000–01	Old Dominion	13–18	7–9	T–5th	
Old Dominion:		122–98	66–44		
Total:		201–163			
National champion Postseason invitational champion Conference regular season champion Conference regular season and conference tournament champion Division regular season champion Division regular season and conference tournament champion Conference tournament champion

=== Professional ===
Legend
Regular season	G	Games coached	W	Games won	L	Games lost	W–L %	Win–loss %
Playoffs	PG	Playoff games	PW	Playoff wins	PL	Playoff losses	PW–L %	Playoff win–loss %

Team	Year	G	W	L	W–L%	Finish	PG	PW	PL	PW–L%	Result
Fayetteville Patriots	2001–02	34	16	18	.471	7th	–	–	–	–	Missed playoffs
Fayetteville Patriots	2002–03	46	29	17	.630	1st	5	3	2	.600	Lost in NBDL Finals
Fayetteville Patriots	2003–04	46	21	25	.457	4th	1	0	1	.000	Lost in semifinals
Career		126	66	60	.524		6	3	3	.500	
