= 1996–97 Utah Utes men's basketball team =

American college basketball season

1996–97 Utah Utes men's basketball

WAC tournament champions WAC Regular season champions

NCAA tournament, Elite Eight
- Conference: Western Athletic Conference
- Mountain

Ranking
- Coaches: No. 6
- AP: No. 2
- Record: 29–4 (15–1 WAC)
- Head coach: Rick Majerus (8th season)
- Captain: Keith Van Horn
- Home arena: Jon M. Huntsman Center

1996–97 WAC men's basketball standings
	Conf.				Overall
Team	W		L	PCT	W		L	PCT
Mountain
No. 2 Utah †	15	–	1	.938	29	–	4	.879
Tulsa	12	–	4	.750	24	–	10	.706
No. 11 New Mexico	11	–	5	.688	25	–	8	.758
TCU	7	–	9	.438	22	–	13	.629
SMU	7	–	9	.438	16	–	12	.571
Rice	6	–	10	.375	12	–	15	.444
UTEP	6	–	10	.375	13	–	13	.500
BYU	0	–	16	.000	1	–	25	.038
Pacific
Fresno State	12	–	4	.750	20	–	12	.625
Hawaii	12	–	4	.750	21	–	8	.724
UNLV	11	–	5	.688	22	–	10	.688
Colorado State	10	–	6	.625	20	–	9	.690
Wyoming	8	–	8	.500	12	–	16	.429
San Jose State	5	–	11	.313	13	–	14	.481
San Diego State	4	–	12	.250	12	–	15	.444
Air Force	2	–	14	.125	7	–	19	.269
† 1997 WAC tournament winner Rankings from AP poll

The 1996–97 Utah Utes men's basketball team represented the University of Utah as a member of the Western Athletic Conference during the 1996–97 men's basketball season. Led by head coach Rick Majerus, the Utes made a run through the NCAA tournament to the West regional final. The team finished with an overall record of 29–4 (15–1 WAC).

== Roster ==
1996–97 Utah Utes men's basketball team
Players
Coaches

Pos.	#	Name	Height	Weight	Year	Hometown
G	3	David Jackson	6 ft 3 in (1.91 m)	229 lb (104 kg)	Fr	Portland, Oregon
G	11	Jordie McTavish	6 ft 0 in (1.83 m)	164 lb (74 kg)	Fr	Salmon Arm, British Columbia
F	13	Hanno Möttölä	6 ft 9 in (2.06 m)	221 lb (100 kg)	Fr	Helsinki, Finland
G	15	Ben Caton	6 ft 3 in (1.91 m)	194 lb (88 kg)	Sr	Alamosa, Colorado
G	24	Andre Miller	6 ft 2 in (1.88 m)	204 lb (93 kg)	So	Los Angeles, California
F	32	Ashante Johnson	6 ft 8 in (2.03 m)	200 lb (91 kg)	So	San Diego, California
G/F	34	Drew Hansen	6 ft 5 in (1.96 m)	185 lb (84 kg)	Jr	Tooele, Utah
G/F	35	Jeff Johnsen	6 ft 4 in (1.93 m)	194 lb (88 kg)	Fr	Murray, Utah
F	42	Mike Puzey	6 ft 8 in (2.03 m)	195 lb (88 kg)	RS Fr	Roy, Utah
F	44	Keith Van Horn (C)	6 ft 10 in (2.08 m)	231 lb (105 kg)	Sr	Diamond Bar, California
F/C	51	Michael Doleac	6 ft 11 in (2.11 m)	269 lb (122 kg)	Jr	Portland, Oregon
C	52	Nate Althoff	6 ft 11 in (2.11 m)	237 lb (108 kg)	RS Fr	Delano, Minnesota

Head coach

- Rick Majerus (Marquette)

Assistant coach(es)

- Donny Daniels (Cal State Fullerton)
- Jeff Judkins (Utah)
- Tommy Connor (Utah)

Legend

- (C) Team captain
- (S) Suspended
- (I) Ineligible
- (W) Walk-on
- Injured
- Current redshirt

== Schedule and results ==
Date time, TV	Rank^{#}	Opponent^{#}	Result	Record	Site city, state
Regular season
Nov 23, 1996	No. 4	Azusa Pacific	W 83–50	1–0	Jon M. Huntsman Center; Salt Lake City, Utah
Nov 26, 1996*	No. 4	at Utah State	W 60–41	2–0	Dee Glen Smith Spectrum; Logan, Utah
Nov 30, 1996*	No. 4	at Cal State Fullerton	W 74–67	3–0	Titan Gym; Fullerton, California
Dec 4, 1996*	No. 3	Southern Utah	W 60–40	4–0	Jon M. Huntsman Center; Salt Lake City, Utah
Dec 7, 1996*	No. 3	vs. No. 15 Arizona; John Wooden Classic	L 61–69	4–1	Arrowhead Pond of Anaheim; Anaheim, California
Dec 14, 1996*	No. 9	Weber State	W 83–48	5–1	Jon M. Huntsman Center; Salt Lake City, Utah
Dec 21, 1996*	No. 9	No. 14 Texas	W 80–68	6–1	Jon M. Huntsman Center; Salt Lake City, Utah
Dec 23, 1996*	No. 9	Wisconsin-Milwaukee	W 77–63	7–1	Jon M. Huntsman Center; Salt Lake City, Utah
Dec 28, 1996*	No. 8	at UC Irvine	W 77–50	8–1	Bren Events Center; Irvine, California
Dec 31, 1996*	No. 7	No. 2 Wake Forest	L 59–70	8–2	Jon M. Huntsman Center; Salt Lake City, Utah
Jan 4, 1997	No. 7	Colorado State	W 84–63	9–2 (1–0)	Jon M. Huntsman Center; Salt Lake City, Utah
Jan 11, 1997	No. 9	at BYU	W 61–51	10–2 (2–0)	Marriott Center; Provo, Utah
Jan 16, 1997	No. 9	at SMU	W 74–57	11–2 (3–0)	Moody Coliseum; Dallas, Texas
Jan 18, 1997	No. 9	at TCU	W 81–77	12–2 (4–0)	Daniel-Meyer Coliseum; Fort Worth, Texas
Jan 25, 1997	No. 5	Rice	W 78–58	13–2 (5–0)	Jon M. Huntsman Center; Salt Lake City, Utah
Jan 27, 1997*	No. 5	No. 24 Tulsa	W 84–58	14–2 (6–0)	Jon M. Huntsman Center; Salt Lake City, Utah
Jan 30, 1997	No. 4	at UTEP	W 74–51	15–2 (7–0)	Don Haskins Center; El Paso, Texas
Feb 1, 1997	No. 4	at No. 13 New Mexico	L 71–87	15–3 (7–1)	The Pit; Albuquerque, New Mexico
Feb 6, 1997	No. 5	BYU	W 85–49	16–3 (8–1)	Jon M. Huntsman Center; Salt Lake City, Utah
Feb 8, 1997	No. 5	at Colorado State	W 82–67	17–3 (9–1)	Moby Arena; Fort Collins, Colorado
Feb 13, 1997	No. 5	SMU	W 84–63	18–3 (10–1)	Jon M. Huntsman Center; Salt Lake City, Utah
Feb 15, 1997	No. 5	TCU	W 94–91	19–3 (11–1)	Jon M. Huntsman Center; Salt Lake City, Utah
Feb 22, 1997	No. 5	at Tulsa	W 56–54	20–3 (12–1)	Tulsa Convention Center; Tulsa, Oklahoma
Feb 24, 1997	No. 5	at Rice	W 75–66	21–3 (13–1)	Tudor Fieldhouse; Houston, Texas
Feb 27, 1997	No. 4	UTEP	W 68–55	22–3 (14–1)	Jon M. Huntsman Center; Salt Lake City, Utah
Mar 1, 1997	No. 4	No. 11 New Mexico	W 78–58	23–3 (15–1)	Jon M. Huntsman Center; Salt Lake City, Utah
WAC Tournament
Mar 6, 1997*	No. 3	vs. SMU; WAC Tournament Quarterfinal	W 59–58	24–3	Thomas & Mack Center; Las Vegas, Nevada
Mar 7, 1997*	No. 3	vs. No. 14 New Mexico; WAC Tournament Semifinal	W 72–70	25–3	Thomas & Mack Center; Las Vegas, Nevada
Mar 8, 1997*	No. 3	vs. TCU; WAC tournament championship	W 89–68	26–3	Thomas & Mack Center; Las Vegas, Nevada
NCAA Tournament
Mar 14, 1997*	(2 W) No. 2	vs. (15 W) Navy; First round	W 75–61	27–3	McKale Center; Tucson, Arizona
Mar 16, 1997*	(2 W) No. 2	vs. (7 W) UNC Charlotte; Second Round	W 77–58	28–3	McKale Center; Tucson, Arizona
Mar 20, 1997*	(2 W) No. 2	vs. No. 21 Stanford; West Regional semifinal – Sweet Sixteen	W 82–77 ^{OT}	29–3	San Jose Arena; San Jose, California
Mar 22, 1997*	(2 W) No. 2	vs. (1 W) No. 5 Kentucky; West Regional final – Elite Eight	L 59–72	29–4	San Jose Arena (18,543); San Jose, California
*Non-conference game. ^{#}Rankings from AP Poll. (#) Tournament seedings in parentheses. W=West.

== Awards and honors ==
- Keith Van Horn – Consensus First-team All-American, WAC Player of the Year (3x)
- Rick Majerus – WAC Coach of the Year

== Team players in the 1997 NBA draft ==
Round	Pick	Player	NBA club
1	2	Keith Van Horn	Philadelphia 76ers
