= 1997 Conference USA men's basketball tournament =

- Classification: Division I
- Season: 1996–97
- Teams: 12
- Site: Kiel Center; St. Louis, MO
- Champions: Marquette (1st title)
- Winning coach: Mike Deane (1st title)
- MVP: Aaron Hutchins (Marquette)

1996–97 Conference USA men's basketball standings
	Conf.				Overall
Team	W		L	PCT	W		L	PCT
Blue
No. 10 Cincinnati	12	–	2	.857	26	–	8	.765
Marquette †	9	–	5	.643	22	–	9	.710
Saint Louis	4	–	10	.286	11	–	18	.379
DePaul	1	–	13	.071	3	–	23	.115
Red
Tulane	11	–	3	.786	20	–	11	.645
UAB	7	–	7	.500	18	–	14	.563
Southern Miss	6	–	8	.429	12	–	15	.444
South Florida	2	–	12	.143	8	–	19	.296
White
UNC Charlotte	10	–	4	.714	22	–	9	.710
Memphis	10	–	4	.714	16	–	15	.516
No. 25 Louisville	9	–	5	.643	26	–	9	.743
Houston	3	–	11	.214	11	–	16	.407
† 1997 Conference USA Tournament winner Rankings from AP Poll

The 1997 Conference USA men's basketball tournament was held March 5–8 at the Kiel Center in St. Louis, Missouri.

Marquette defeated UNC Charlotte in the championship game, 60–52, to clinch their first Conference USA men's tournament championship.

The Golden Eagles, in turn, received an automatic bid to the 1997 NCAA tournament. They were joined in the tournament by fellow C-USA members UNC Charlotte, Cincinnati, and Louisville, who all earned at-large bids.

== Format ==
With Houston officially joining Conference USA prior to 1996–97 season, total membership increased to twelve. The Cougars were entered directly into the conference's three four-team division structure, being placed into the White Division.

With the addition of Houston, the tournament field expanded from eleven to twelve. Nonetheless, the overall structure remained largely the same: the top four teams were given byes into the quarterfinal round, and the remaining eight teams were entered into the preliminary round. All seeds were determined by regular season conference records, regardless of division.

== Bracket ==
First round Wednesday, March 5
9	Saint Louis	69
8	Southern Miss	61
5	Marquette	79
12	DePaul	53
11	South Florida	58
6	#20 Louisville	69
7	UAB	55
10	Houston	54

Quarterfinals; Thursday, March 6
1	#10 Cincinnati	71
9	Saint Louis	43
5	Marquette	63
4	Memphis	45
3	UNC Charlotte	64
6	#20 Louisville	60
7	UAB	74
2	Tulane	70

Semifinals; Friday, March 7
1	#10 Cincinnati	79
5	Marquette	91
3	UNC Charlotte	67
7	UAB	65

Championship; Saturday, March 8
5	Marquette	60
3	UNC Charlotte	52
