= 1996–97 Marquette Golden Eagles men's basketball team =

American college basketball season

1996–97 Marquette Golden Eagles men's basketball

Conference USA tournament champions

NCAA tournament, first round, L 59–81 vs. Providence
- Conference: Conference USA
- Blue
- Record: 22–9 (9-5 CUSA)
- Head coach: Mike Deane (3rd season)
- Home arena: Bradley Center

1996–97 Conference USA men's basketball standings
	Conf.				Overall
Team	W		L	PCT	W		L	PCT
Blue
No. 10 Cincinnati	12	–	2	.857	26	–	8	.765
Marquette †	9	–	5	.643	22	–	9	.710
Saint Louis	4	–	10	.286	11	–	18	.379
DePaul	1	–	13	.071	3	–	23	.115
Red
Tulane	11	–	3	.786	20	–	11	.645
UAB	7	–	7	.500	18	–	14	.563
Southern Miss	6	–	8	.429	12	–	15	.444
South Florida	2	–	12	.143	8	–	19	.296
White
UNC Charlotte	10	–	4	.714	22	–	9	.710
Memphis	10	–	4	.714	16	–	15	.516
No. 25 Louisville	9	–	5	.643	26	–	9	.743
Houston	3	–	11	.214	11	–	16	.407
† 1997 Conference USA Tournament winner Rankings from AP Poll

The 1996–97 Marquette Golden Eagles men's basketball team represented the Marquette University in the 1996–97 season. The Golden Eagles finished the regular season with a record of 22–9.

== Roster ==
1996–97 Marquette Golden Eagles men's basketball team
Players
Coaches

Pos.	#	Name	Height	Weight	Year	Hometown
F	40	Faisal Abraham	6 ft 7 in (2.01 m)	225 lb (102 kg)	Sr	St. Croix, Virgin Islands
F	5	Chris Crawford	6 ft 9 in (2.06 m)	215 lb (98 kg)	Sr	Kalamazoo, Michigan
G	12	Aaron Hutchins	5 ft 10 in (1.78 m)	175 lb (79 kg)	Jr	Lima, Ohio
C	45	Jarrod Lovette	6 ft 10 in (2.08 m)	245 lb (111 kg)	So	Blair, Wisconsin
G	3	Anthony Pieper	6 ft 3 in (1.91 m)	185 lb (84 kg)	Sr	Wausaukee, Wisconsin

Head coach

- Mike Deane

Assistant coach(es)

Legend

- (C) Team captain
- (S) Suspended
- (I) Ineligible
- (W) Walk-on
- Injured
- Current redshirt

== Schedule ==
Date time, TV	Rank^{#}	Opponent^{#}	Result	Record	Site city, state
November 24*		UW Milwaukee	W 82–55	1–0	Bradley Center; Milwaukee, WI
November 29*		at Santa Clara	L 72–79	1–1	Leavey Center; Santa Clara, California
December 6*		Prairie View A&M	W 104–49	2–1	Bradley Center; Milwaukee, WI
December 7*		Princeton	L 62–66	2–2	Bradley Center; Milwaukee, WI
December 14*		Green Bay	W 55–39	3–2	Bradley Center; Milwaukee, WI
December 16*		Coastal Carolina	W 66–42	4–2	Bradley Center; Milwaukee, WI
December 19*		Appalachian State	W 74–37	5–2	Bradley Center; Milwaukee, WI
December 22*		La Salle	W 86–53	6–2	Bradley Center; Milwaukee, WI
December 27*		at Dayton	W 65–61	7–2	University of Dayton Arena; Dayton, Ohio
December 31*		Wisconsin	W 59–52	8–2	Bradley Center (15,292); Milwaukee, WI
January 4		Southern Mississippi	W 61–44	9–2 (1–0)	Bradley Center; Milwaukee, WI
January 7*		at Iowa State	W 67–64	10–2 (1–0)	James H. Hilton Coliseum; Ames, Iowa
January 9		DePaul	W 75–50	11–2 (2–0)	Bradley Center; Milwaukee, WI
January 12		at Memphis	L 47–54	11–3 (2–1)	The Pyramid; Memphis, Tennessee
January 18		Saint Louis	W 69–48	12–3 (3–1)	Bradley Center; Milwaukee, WI
January 26		at DePaul	W 61–49	13–3 (4–1)	Allstate Arena; Rosemont, Illinois
January 30		at South Florida	W 71–36	14–3 (5–1)	Sun Dome; Tampa, Florida
February 1		Tulane	L 53–54	14–4 (5–2)	Bradley Center; Milwaukee, WI
February 5*		Maine	L 59–68	14–5 (5–2)	Bradley Center; Milwaukee, WI
February 8		at No. 12 Cincinnati	L 46–66	14–6 (5–3)	Fifth Third Arena; Cincinnati, Ohio
February 15		at UNC Charlotte	L 46–66	14–7 (5–4)	Dale F. Halton Arena; Charlotte, NC
February 17		at Alabama-Birmingham	W 68–52	15–7 (6–4)	Bartow Arena; Birmingham, Alabama
February 20		Louisville	W 79–71 ^{OT}	16–7 (7–4)	Bradley Center; Milwaukee, WI
February 25		at Saint Louis	W 79–71	17–7 (8–4)	Scottrade Center; St. Louis, Missouri
February 27		Cincinnati	L 74–80	17–8 (8–5)	Bradley Center; Milwaukee, WI
March 2		Houston	W 76–67	18–8 (9–5)	Bradley Center; Milwaukee, WI
Conference USA tournament
March 5	(5)	vs. (12) DePaul; First Round	W 79–53	19–8 (10–5)	Scottrade Center; St. Louis, Missouri
March 6	(5)	vs. (4) Memphis; Quarterfinals	W 63–45	20–8 (11–5)	Scottrade Center; St. Louis, Missouri
March 7	(5)	vs. (1) No. 10 Cincinnati; Semifinals	W 91–79	21–8 (12–5)	Scottrade Center; St. Louis, Missouri
March 8	(5)	vs. (3) UNC Charlotte; Championship Game	W 60–51	22–8 (13–5)	Scottrade Center; St. Louis, Missouri
NCAA tournament
March 14*; CBS	(7 SE)	vs. (10 SE) Providence; First Round	L 59–81	22–9 (13–5)	Bojangles' Coliseum; Charlotte, NC
*Non-conference game. ^{#}Rankings from AP Poll. (#) Tournament seedings in parentheses. SE=Southeast.

== Team players drafted into the NBA ==
Round	Pick	Player	NBA club
2	50	Chris Crawford	Atlanta Hawks
