= 1996–97 New Mexico Lobos men's basketball team =

American college basketball season

1996–97 New Mexico Lobos men's basketball

NCAA tournament, Second round
- Conference: Western Athletic Conference
- Mountain

Ranking
- Coaches: No. 19
- AP: No. 11
- Record: 25–8 (11–5 WAC)
- Head coach: Dave Bliss (9th season)
- Home arena: University Arena

1996–97 WAC men's basketball standings
	Conf.				Overall
Team	W		L	PCT	W		L	PCT
Mountain
No. 2 Utah †	15	–	1	.938	29	–	4	.879
Tulsa	12	–	4	.750	24	–	10	.706
No. 11 New Mexico	11	–	5	.688	25	–	8	.758
TCU	7	–	9	.438	22	–	13	.629
SMU	7	–	9	.438	16	–	12	.571
Rice	6	–	10	.375	12	–	15	.444
UTEP	6	–	10	.375	13	–	13	.500
BYU	0	–	16	.000	1	–	25	.038
Pacific
Fresno State	12	–	4	.750	20	–	12	.625
Hawaii	12	–	4	.750	21	–	8	.724
UNLV	11	–	5	.688	22	–	10	.688
Colorado State	10	–	6	.625	20	–	9	.690
Wyoming	8	–	8	.500	12	–	16	.429
San Jose State	5	–	11	.313	13	–	14	.481
San Diego State	4	–	12	.250	12	–	15	.444
Air Force	2	–	14	.125	7	–	19	.269
† 1997 WAC tournament winner Rankings from AP poll

The 1996–97 New Mexico Lobos men's basketball team represented the University of New Mexico as a member of the Western Athletic Conference during the 1996–97 NCAA Division I men's basketball season. The Lobos were coached by head coach Dave Bliss and played their home games at the University Arena, also known as "The Pit", in Albuquerque, New Mexico. New Mexico finished 3rd in the WAC Mountain division regular season standings and lost to Utah in the semifinals of the WAC Tournament. The Lobos received an at-large bid to the NCAA tournament as No. 3 seed in the East region. After defeating Old Dominion in the opening round, New Mexico was bounced in the round of 32 by Louisville, 64–63, to finish with a 25–8 record (11–5 WAC).

The top four scorers (career) in school history played on this team – Charles Smith, Kenny Thomas, Lamont Long, and Clayton Shields.

== Roster ==
1996–97 New Mexico Lobos men's basketball team
Players
Coaches

Pos.	#	Name	Height	Weight	Year	Hometown
G	3	Lamont Long	6 ft 4 in (1.93 m)	—	Fr
F	4	Kenny Thomas	6 ft 7 in (2.01 m)	230 lb (104 kg)	So	Albuquerque, New Mexico
G	5	Charles Smith	6 ft 4 in (1.93 m)	195 lb (88 kg)	Sr	Fort Worth, Texas
F	22	Clayton Shields	6 ft 8 in (2.03 m)	205 lb (93 kg)	Jr	Baytown, Texas
G	32	David Gibson	6 ft 2 in (1.88 m)	—	Jr

Head coach

- Dave Bliss

Assistant coach(es)

Legend

- (C) Team captain
- (S) Suspended
- (I) Ineligible
- (W) Walk-on
- Injured
- Current redshirt

== Schedule and results ==
Date time, TV	Rank^{#}	Opponent^{#}	Result	Record	Site (attendance) city, state
Regular season
Nov 18, 1996*	No. 18	Simon Fraser	W 107–54	1–0	The Pit; Albuquerque, New Mexico
Nov 22, 1996*	No. 18	Columbia	W 94–56	2–0	The Pit; Albuquerque, New Mexico
Nov 23, 1996*	No. 18	Eastern Washington	W 69–53	3–0	The Pit; Albuquerque, New Mexico
Nov 27, 1996*	No. 19	Centenary	W 96–64	4–0	The Pit; Albuquerque, New Mexico
Nov 30, 1996*	No. 19	No. 11 Arizona	W 84–77	5–0	The Pit; Albuquerque, New Mexico
Dec 4, 1996*	No. 11	at Texas Tech	L 68–77	5–1	Lubbock Municipal Coliseum; Lubbock, Texas
Dec 7, 1996*	No. 11	at New Mexico State	W 86–72	6–1	Pan American Center; Las Cruces, New Mexico
Dec 13, 1996*	No. 15	New Mexico State	W 84–82 ^{OT}	7–1	The Pit; Albuquerque, New Mexico
Dec 21, 1996*	No. 15	Sam Houston State	W 76–55	8–1	The Pit; Albuquerque, New Mexico
Dec 23, 1996*	No. 14	Jackson State	W 98–45	9–1	The Pit; Albuquerque, New Mexico
Dec 27, 1996*	No. 14	Bucknell	W 67–57	10–1	The Pit; Albuquerque, New Mexico
Dec 28, 1996*	No. 14	Ole Miss	W 75–64	11–1	The Pit; Albuquerque, New Mexico
Jan 5, 1997	No. 16	at Hawaii	L 62–75	11–2 (0–1)	Stan Sheriff Center; Honolulu, Hawaii
Feb 22, 1997	No. 10	Hawaii	W 89–69	21–5 (10–4)	The Pit; Albuquerque, New Mexico
Feb 27, 1997	No. 11	at BYU	W 90–48	22–5 (11–4)	Marriott Center; Provo, Utah
Mar 1, 1997	No. 11	at No. 4 Utah	L 58–78	22–6 (11–5)	Jon M. Huntsman Center; Salt Lake City, Utah
WAC tournament
Mar 4, 1997*	(3 M) No. 14	vs. (6 P) San Jose State; First round	W 103–70	23–6	Thomas & Mack Center; Paradise, Nevada
Mar 6, 1997*	(3 M) No. 14	vs. (2 P) Hawaii; Quarterfinals	W 65–57	24–6	Thomas & Mack Center; Paradise, Nevada
Mar 7, 1997*	(3 M) No. 14	vs. (1 M) No. 3 Utah; Semifinals	L 70–72	24–7	Thomas & Mack Center; Paradise, Nevada
NCAA tournament
Mar 14, 1997*	(3 E) No. 11	vs. (14 E) Old Dominion	W 59–55	25–7	Civic Arena; Pittsburgh, Pennsylvania
Mar 16, 1997*	(3 E) No. 11	vs. (6 E) No. 25 Louisville; Second round	L 63–64	25–8	Civic Arena; Pittsburgh, Pennsylvania
*Non-conference game. ^{#}Rankings from AP poll. (#) Tournament seedings in parentheses. E=East.
