= 1994 MEAC men's basketball tournament =

- Classification: Division I
- Season: 1993–94
- Teams: 9
- Site: Talmadge L. Hill Field House; Baltimore, Maryland
- Champions: North Carolina A&T (14th title)
- Winning coach: Jeff Capel (1st title)
- MVP: Phillip Allen (North Carolina A&T)

1993–94 MEAC men's basketball standings
	Conf.				Overall
Team	W		L	PCT	W		L	PCT
Coppin State	16	–	0	1.000	22	–	8	.733
Maryland Eastern Shore	10	–	6	.625	16	–	12	.571
South Carolina State	10	–	6	.625	16	–	13	.552
North Carolina A&T †	10	–	6	.625	16	–	14	.533
Bethune–Cookman	8	–	8	.500	9	–	18	.333
Howard	7	–	9	.438	10	–	17	.370
Delaware State	5	–	11	.313	8	–	19	.296
Morgan State	4	–	12	.250	8	–	21	.276
Florida A&M	2	–	14	.125	4	–	23	.148
† 1994 MEAC tournament winner Rankings from AP Poll

The 1994 Mid-Eastern Athletic Conference men's basketball tournament took place March 8–11, 1994, at the Talmadge L. Hill Field House in Baltimore, Maryland. It was the first time in twenty years that Baltimore had hosted the MEAC men's tournament. North Carolina A&T defeated South Carolina State, 87–70 in the championship game, to win its 14th MEAC Tournament title.

The Aggies earned an automatic bid to the 1994 NCAA tournament as No. 16 seed in the Midwest region. In the round of 64, North Carolina A&T fell to No. 1 seed and eventual National champion Arkansas 94–79.

== Format ==
All nine conference members participated, with the top 7 teams receiving a bye to the quarterfinal round.

== Bracket ==
First round March 8
8	Morgan State	70
9	Florida A&M	66

Quarterfinals; March 9
1	Coppin State	60
8	Morgan State	61
4	South Carolina State	73
5	Bethune–Cookman	69
3	North Carolina A&T	61
6	Howard	57
2	Maryland Eastern Shore	91
7	Delaware State	76

Semifinals; March 10
8	Morgan State	63
4	South Carolina State	69
3	North Carolina A&T	76
2	Maryland Eastern Shore	73

Final; March 11
4	South Carolina State	70
3	North Carolina A&T	87
