= 1996–97 DePaul Blue Demons men's basketball team =

American college basketball season

1996–97 DePaul Blue Demons men's basketball
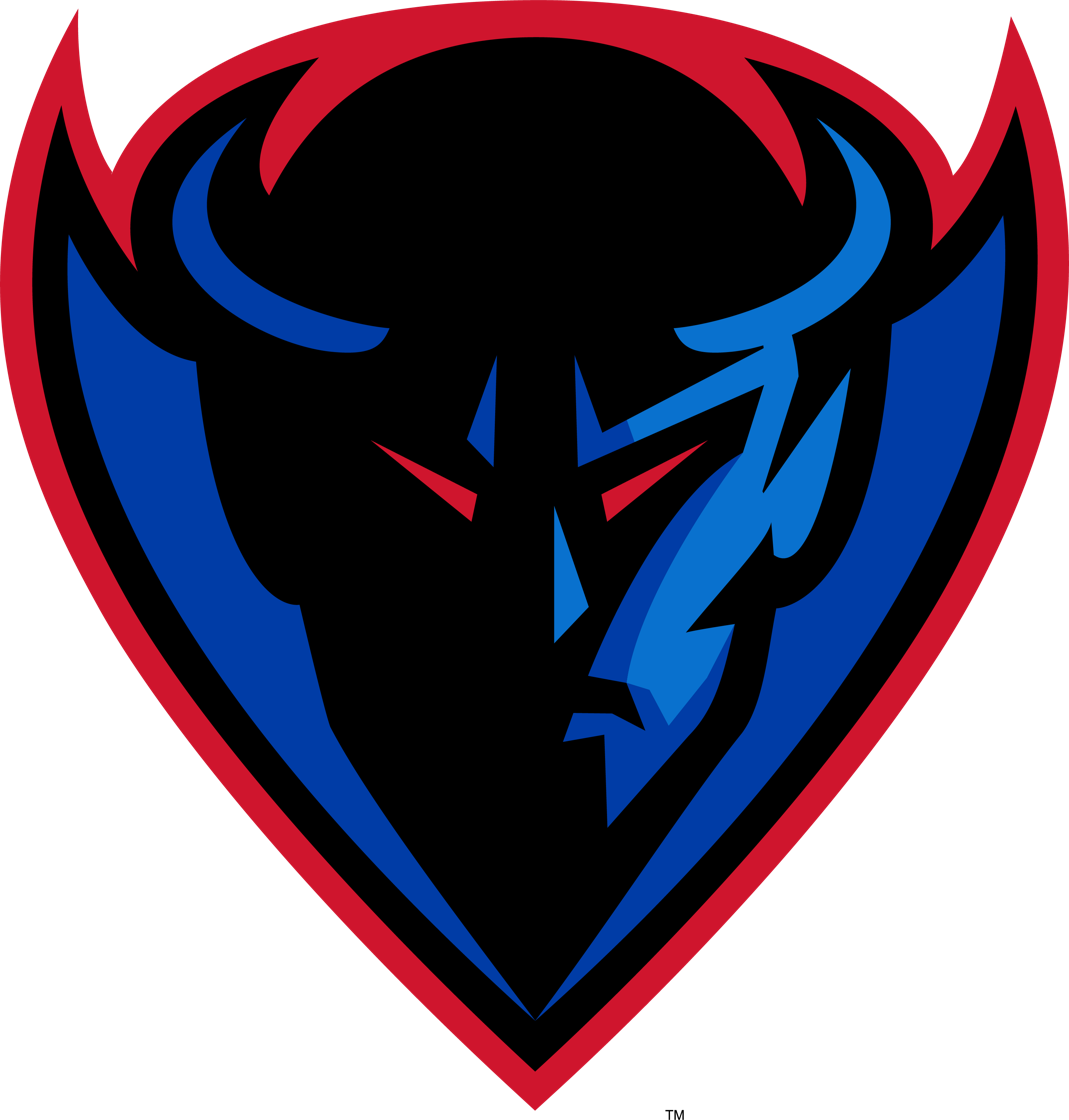
- Conference: Conference USA
- Record: 3-23 (1-13 CUSA)
- Head coach: Joey Meyer
- Home arena: Rosemont Horizon

1996–97 Conference USA men's basketball standings
	Conf.				Overall
Team	W		L	PCT	W		L	PCT
Blue
No. 10 Cincinnati	12	–	2	.857	26	–	8	.765
Marquette †	9	–	5	.643	22	–	9	.710
Saint Louis	4	–	10	.286	11	–	18	.379
DePaul	1	–	13	.071	3	–	23	.115
Red
Tulane	11	–	3	.786	20	–	11	.645
UAB	7	–	7	.500	18	–	14	.563
Southern Miss	6	–	8	.429	12	–	15	.444
South Florida	2	–	12	.143	8	–	19	.296
White
UNC Charlotte	10	–	4	.714	22	–	9	.710
Memphis	10	–	4	.714	16	–	15	.516
No. 25 Louisville	9	–	5	.643	26	–	9	.743
Houston	3	–	11	.214	11	–	16	.407
† 1997 Conference USA Tournament winner Rankings from AP Poll

1996–97 DePaul Blue Demons men's basketball team represented DePaul University during the 1996–97 men's college basketball season.

On December 28, 1996, DePaul lost to Miami 61–45 in the Orange Bowl Basketball Classic at Miami Arena.

The Blue Demons finished the season with a 3–23 record. On March 5, 1997, DePaul was eliminated in the CUSA tournament first round by Marquette 79–53.
