= 1996–97 USC Trojans men's basketball team =

American college basketball season

1996–97 USC Trojans men's basketball

NCAA tournament, First Round
- Conference: Pacific-10 Conference
- Record: 17–11 (12–6 Pac-10)
- Head coach: Henry Bibby (1st season)
- Home arena: L. A. Sports Arena

1996–97 Pacific-10 Conference men's basketball standings
	Conf.				Overall
Team	W		L	PCT	W		L	PCT
No. 7 UCLA	15	–	3	.833	24	–	8	.750
No. 21 Stanford	12	–	6	.667	22	–	8	.733
California	12	–	6	.667	23	–	9	.719
USC	12	–	6	.667	17	–	11	.607
No. 15 Arizona	11	–	7	.611	25	–	9	.735
Washington	10	–	8	.556	17	–	11	.607
Oregon	8	–	10	.444	17	–	11	.607
Washington State	5	–	13	.278	13	–	17	.433
Oregon State	3	–	15	.167	7	–	20	.259
Arizona State	2	–	16	.111	10	–	20	.333
Rankings from AP Poll

The 1996–97 USC Trojans men's basketball team represented the University of Southern California during the 1996–97 NCAA Division I men's basketball season. Led by head coach Henry Bibby, they played their home games at the L. A. Sports Arena in Los Angeles, California as members of the Pac-10 Conference. The Trojans finished the season with a record of 17–11 (12–6 Pac-10) and received an at-large bid to the NCAA tournament.

== Roster ==
1996–97 USC Trojans men's basketball team
Players	Coaches
Pos. / # / Name / Height / Weight / Year / Previous school / Hometown; G / 12 / Rodrick Rhodes / 6 ft 6 in (1.98 m) / 220 lb (100 kg) / Sr / Kentucky / Jersey City, New Jersey	Head coach: Henry Bibby (UCLA); Assistant coach(es) Legend: (C) Team captain; (S) Suspended; (I) Ineligible; (W) Walk-on; Injured; Current redshirt

== Schedule and results ==
Date time, TV	Rank^{#}	Opponent^{#}	Result	Record	Site (attendance) city, state
Regular season
Nov 30, 1996*		Long Beach State	W 77–70	1–0	L.A. Sports Arena; Los Angeles, California
Dec 2, 1996*		Loyola Marymount	W 97–78	2–0	L.A. Sports Arena; Los Angeles, California
Dec 6, 1996*		vs. No. 14 North Carolina	L 84–99	2–1	Charlotte Coliseum; Charlotte, North Carolina
Dec 7, 1996*		at UNC Charlotte	W 65–61	3–1	Charlotte Coliseum; Charlotte, North Carolina
Dec 15, 1996*		at UC Irvine	W 107–45	4–1	Bren Events Center; Irvine, California
Dec 18, 1996*		at Tennessee	L 59–71	4–2	Thompson-Boling Arena; Knoxville, Tennessee
Dec 21, 1996*		Ohio State	W 79–68	5–2	L.A. Sports Arena; Los Angeles, California
Dec 28, 1996*		at UNLV	L 75–80	5–3	Thomas & Mack Center; Las Vegas, Nevada
Jan 2, 1997		Washington	W 77–58	6–3 (1–0)	L.A. Sports Arena; Los Angeles, California
Jan 4, 1997		Washington State	W 106–73	7–3 (2–0)	L.A. Sports Arena; Los Angeles, California
Jan 9, 1997		at California	L 71–83	7–4 (2–1)	Harmon Gym; Berkeley, California
Jan 11, 1997		at No. 21 Stanford	L 70–85	7–5 (2–2)	Maples Pavilion; Stanford, California
Jan 16, 1997		No. 6 Arizona	W 75–62	8–5 (3–2)	L.A. Sports Arena; Los Angeles, California
Jan 18, 1997		Arizona State	W 75–56	9–5 (4–2)	L.A. Sports Arena; Los Angeles, California
Jan 23, 1997		UCLA	L 87–96	9–6 (4–3)	L.A. Sports Arena; Los Angeles, California
Jan 26, 1997*		No. 9 Cincinnati	L 81–100	9–7	L.A. Sports Arena; Los Angeles, California
Jan 30, 1997		at Oregon State	W 71–68	10–7 (5–3)	Gill Coliseum; Corvallis, Oregon
Feb 1, 1997		at Oregon	W 79–69	11–7 (6–3)	McArthur Court; Eugene, Oregon
Feb 6, 1997		No. 18 Stanford	W 84–81	12–7 (7–3)	L.A. Sports Arena; Los Angeles, California
Feb 8, 1997		California	W 93–85	13–7 (8–3)	L.A. Sports Arena; Los Angeles, California
Feb 13, 1997		at Arizona State	W 72–66	14–7 (9–3)	Wells Fargo Arena; Tempe, Arizona
Feb 15, 1997		at No. 11 Arizona	L 77–101	14–8 (9–4)	McKale Center; Tucson, Arizona
Feb 19, 1997		at No. 17 UCLA	L 60–82	14–9 (9–5)	Pauley Pavilion; Los Angeles, California
Feb 27, 1997		Oregon	W 72–69	15–9 (10–5)	L.A. Sports Arena; Los Angeles, California
Mar 1, 1997		Oregon State	W 83–62	16–9 (11–5)	L.A. Sports Arena; Los Angeles, California
Mar 6, 1997		at Washington State	W 92–85	17–9 (12–5)	Friel Court; Pullman, Washington
Mar 8, 1997		at Washington	L 84–94	17–10 (12–6)	Bank of America Arena; Seattle, Washington
NCAA Tournament
Mar 14, 1997*; CBS	(11 SE)	vs. (6 SE) No. 19 Illinois; First round	L 77–90	17–11	Charlotte Coliseum (11,206); Charlotte, North Carolina
*Non-conference game. ^{#}Rankings from AP Poll. (#) Tournament seedings in parentheses. SE=Southeast. All times are in Pacific Time.

== Team Players in the 1997 NBA draft ==
Round	Pick	Player	NBA club
1	24	Rodrick Rhodes	Houston Rockets
