= 1996–97 UNC Charlotte 49ers men's basketball team =

American college basketball season

1996–97 UNC Charlotte 49ers men's basketball
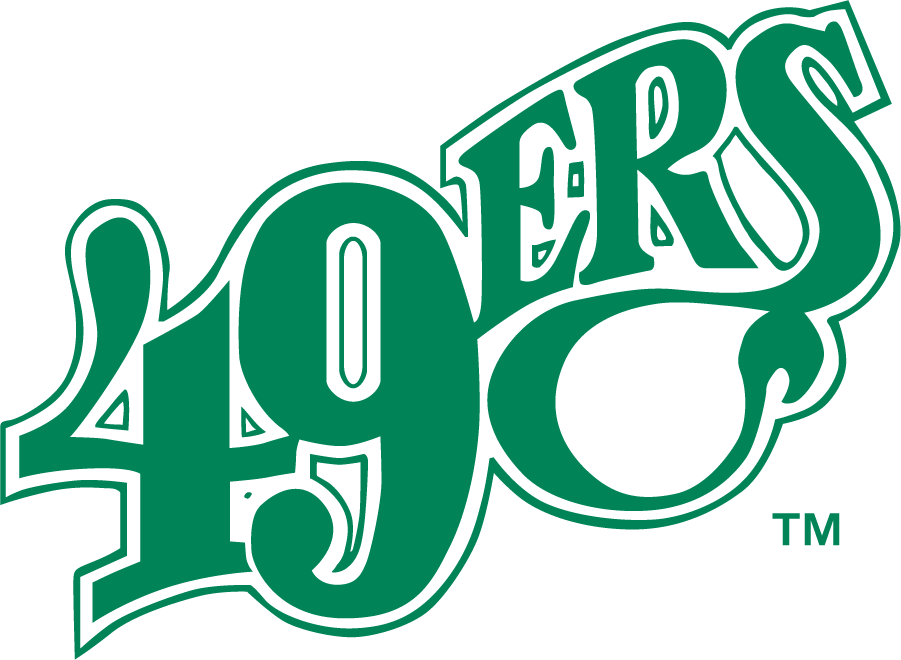

NCAA tournament, Second round
- Conference: Conference USA
- Record: 22–9 (10–4 C-USA)
- Head coach: Melvin Watkins (1st season)
- Home arena: Dale F. Halton Arena

1996–97 Conference USA men's basketball standings
	Conf.				Overall
Team	W		L	PCT	W		L	PCT
Blue
No. 10 Cincinnati	12	–	2	.857	26	–	8	.765
Marquette †	9	–	5	.643	22	–	9	.710
Saint Louis	4	–	10	.286	11	–	18	.379
DePaul	1	–	13	.071	3	–	23	.115
Red
Tulane	11	–	3	.786	20	–	11	.645
UAB	7	–	7	.500	18	–	14	.563
Southern Miss	6	–	8	.429	12	–	15	.444
South Florida	2	–	12	.143	8	–	19	.296
White
UNC Charlotte	10	–	4	.714	22	–	9	.710
Memphis	10	–	4	.714	16	–	15	.516
No. 25 Louisville	9	–	5	.643	26	–	9	.743
Houston	3	–	11	.214	11	–	16	.407
† 1997 Conference USA Tournament winner Rankings from AP Poll

The 1996–97 UNC Charlotte 49ers men's basketball team represented the University of North Carolina at Charlotte in the 1996–97 college basketball season. This was head coach Melvin Watkins's first of two seasons at the helm of his alma mater. The 49ers competed in Conference USA and played their home games at Dale F. Halton Arena. They finished the season 22–9 (10–4 in C-USA play) and received an at-large bid to the 1997 NCAA tournament as No. 7 seed in the West region. The 49ers defeated Georgetown in the opening round before losing to No. 2 seed Utah, 77–58, in the round of 32.

== Roster ==
1996–97 Charlotte 49ers men's basketball team
Players
Coaches

Pos.	#	Name	Height	Weight	Year	Hometown
F	4	DeMarco Johnson	6 ft 9 in (2.06 m)	245 lb (111 kg)	Jr	Charlotte, North Carolina
G	5	Sean Colson	6 ft 3 in (1.91 m)	170 lb (77 kg)	Jr	Philadelphia, Pennsylvania
F/C	33	DeMarco Johnson	6 ft 9 in (2.06 m)	235 lb (107 kg)	Jr	Charlotte, North Carolina

Head coach

- Melvin Watkins

Assistant coach(es)

Legend

- (C) Team captain
- (S) Suspended
- (I) Ineligible
- (W) Walk-on
- Injured
- Current redshirt

Roster

== Schedule and results ==
Date time, TV	Rank^{#}	Opponent^{#}	Result	Record	Site city, state
Regular season
Nov 26, 1996*		at Kent State	W 96–82	1–0	Memorial Athletic and Convocation Center; Kent, Ohio
Nov 30, 1996*		at Old Dominion	L 64–65	1–1	Norfolk Scope; Norfolk, Virginia
Dec 2, 1996*		Appalachian State	W 75–63	2–1	Dale F. Halton Arena; Charlotte, North Carolina
Dec 6, 1996*		South Carolina	L 60–75	2–2	Charlotte Coliseum; Charlotte, North Carolina
Dec 7, 1996*		USC	L 61–65	2–3	Charlotte Coliseum; Charlotte, North Carolina
Dec 14, 1996*		at Davidson	W 70–68	3–3	Belk Arena; Davidson, North Carolina
Dec 18, 1996*		Southern Illinois	W 71–62	4–3	Dale F. Halton Arena; Charlotte, North Carolina
Dec 21, 1996*		at Canisius	W 54–51	5–3	Koessler Athletic Center; Buffalo, New York
Dec 28, 1996*		Tennessee	W 72–51	6–3	Dale F. Halton Arena; Charlotte, North Carolina
Dec 30, 1996*		George Washington	W 76–69	7–3	Dale F. Halton Arena; Charlotte, North Carolina
Jan 4, 1997*		VMI	W 96–76	8–3	Dale F. Halton Arena; Charlotte, North Carolina
Jan 6, 1997		No. 14 Louisville	L 81–92	8–4 (0–1)	Dale F. Halton Arena; Charlotte, North Carolina
Jan 9, 1997		Memphis	W 71–65	9–4 (1–1)	Dale F. Halton Arena; Charlotte, North Carolina
Jan 11, 1997		Saint Louis	W 81–52	10–4 (2–1)	Dale F. Halton Arena; Charlotte, North Carolina
Jan 14, 1997		at South Florida	W 69–64	11–4 (3–1)	Sun Dome; Tampa, Florida
Jan 19, 1997		at Memphis	W 76–70	12–4 (4–1)	The Pyramid; Memphis, Tennessee
Jan 21, 1997		No. 9 Cincinnati	L 67–77	12–5 (4–2)	Dale F. Halton Arena; Charlotte, North Carolina
C-USA tournament
Mar 6, 1997*		vs. No. 20 Louisville; Quarterfinals	W 64–60	20–7	Scottrade Center; St. Louis, Missouri
Mar 7, 1997*		vs. UAB; Semifinals	W 67–65	21–7	Scottrade Center; St. Louis, Missouri
Mar 8, 1997*		vs. Marquette; Championship game	L 52–60	21–8	Scottrade Center; St. Louis, Missouri
NCAA tournament
Mar 14, 1997*; CBS	(7 W)	vs. (10 W) Georgetown; Second round	W 79–67	22–8	McKale Center (12,958); Tucson, Arizona
Mar 16, 1997*; CBS	(7 W)	vs. (2 W) No. 2 Utah; Second round	L 58–77	22–9	McKale Center; Tucson, Arizona
*Non-conference game. ^{#}Rankings from AP poll. (#) Tournament seedings in parentheses. W=West.
