= 1996–97 Washington State Cougars men's basketball team =

American college basketball season

1996–97 Washington State Cougars men's basketball
- Conference: Pacific-10 Conference
- Record: 13–17 (5–13 Pac-10)
- Head coach: Kevin Eastman (3rd season)
- Home arena: Beasley Coliseum

1996–97 Pacific-10 Conference men's basketball standings
	Conf.				Overall
Team	W		L	PCT	W		L	PCT
No. 7 UCLA	15	–	3	.833	24	–	8	.750
No. 21 Stanford	12	–	6	.667	22	–	8	.733
California	12	–	6	.667	23	–	9	.719
USC	12	–	6	.667	17	–	11	.607
No. 15 Arizona	11	–	7	.611	25	–	9	.735
Washington	10	–	8	.556	17	–	11	.607
Oregon	8	–	10	.444	17	–	11	.607
Washington State	5	–	13	.278	13	–	17	.433
Oregon State	3	–	15	.167	7	–	20	.259
Arizona State	2	–	16	.111	10	–	20	.333
Rankings from AP Poll

The 1996–97 Washington State Cougars men's basketball team represented Washington State University for the 1996–97 NCAA Division I men's basketball season. Led by third-year head coach Kevin Eastman, the Cougars were members of the Pacific-10 Conference and played their home games on campus at Beasley Coliseum in Pullman, Washington.

The Cougars were 13–17 overall in the regular season and 5–13 in conference play, eighth in the standings.

There was no conference tournament this season; last played in 1990, it resumed in 2002.
