= 1996–97 Arizona Wildcats men's basketball team =

American college basketball season

1996–97 Arizona Wildcats men's basketball

NCAA tournament National Champions

National Championship Game, W 84–79 ^{OT} vs. Kentucky
- Conference: Pacific-10 Conference

Ranking
- Coaches: No. 1
- AP: No. 15
- Record: 25–9 (11–7 Pac-10)
- Head coach: Lute Olson (14th season)
- Assistant coaches: Jim Rosborough (8th season); Jessie Evans (9th season); Phil Johnson (4th season)
- Captains: Michael Dickerson; Miles Simon
- Home arena: McKale Center

1996–97 Pacific-10 Conference men's basketball standings
	Conf.				Overall
Team	W		L	PCT	W		L	PCT
No. 7 UCLA	15	–	3	.833	24	–	8	.750
No. 21 Stanford	12	–	6	.667	22	–	8	.733
California	12	–	6	.667	23	–	9	.719
USC	12	–	6	.667	17	–	11	.607
No. 15 Arizona	11	–	7	.611	25	–	9	.735
Washington	10	–	8	.556	17	–	11	.607
Oregon	8	–	10	.444	17	–	11	.607
Washington State	5	–	13	.278	13	–	17	.433
Oregon State	3	–	15	.167	7	–	20	.259
Arizona State	2	–	16	.111	10	–	20	.333
Rankings from AP Poll

The 1996–97 Arizona Wildcats men's basketball team represented the University of Arizona. The head coach was Lute Olson. The team played its home games in the McKale Center, and was a member of the Pacific-10 Conference.

After going 11–7 in conference play the team was seeded fourth in the Southeast Region of the 1997 NCAA tournament. They went on to win the national championship, the first in program history, defeating three top-seeded teams in the process.

== Roster ==
1996–97 Arizona Wildcats men's basketball team
Players
Coaches

Pos.	#	Name	Height	Weight	Year	Previous school	Hometown
G	10	Mike Bibby	6 ft 1 in (1.85 m)	—	Fr	Shadow Mountain	Phoenix, AZ
G	12	Josh Pastner	6 ft 0 in (1.83 m)	—	Fr	Kingwood	Kingwood, TX
F	13	Donnell Harris	6 ft 11 in (2.11 m)	—	So	North Salinas	Salinas, CA
G	15	John Ash	5 ft 11 in (1.8 m)	—	Fr	Salpointe	Tucson, AZ
F	21	Bennett Davison	6 ft 8 in (2.03 m)	—	Jr	Analy; West Valley JC	Sebastopol, CA
F	23	Michael Dickerson (C)	6 ft 5 in (1.96 m)	—	Jr	Federal Way	Seattle, WA
G	24	Quynn Tebbs	6 ft 1 in (1.85 m)	—	Fr	Bingham	Salt Lake City, UT
F	30	Justin Wessel	6 ft 8 in (2.03 m)	—	Fr	Prairie	Iowa City, IA
G	31	Jason Terry	6 ft 2 in (1.88 m)	—	So	Franklin	Seattle, WA
F	33	Eugene Edgerson	6 ft 6 in (1.98 m)	—	Fr	St. Augustine	New Orleans, LA
G	34	Miles Simon (C)	6 ft 5 in (1.96 m)	—	Jr	Mater Dei	Fullerton, CA
G	40	Jason Lee (W)	6 ft 4 in (1.93 m)	—	Sr	Allegheny/Irvine	Irvine, CA
F	42	A. J. Bramlett	6 ft 11 in (2.11 m)	—	So	La Cueva	Albuquerque, NM
G	52	Jason Steward	5 ft 11 in (1.8 m)	—	So	Gardena	Gardena, CA

Head coach

- Lute Olson (Augsburg)

Assistant coach(es)

- Phil Johnson (East Central)
- Jim Rosborough (Iowa)
- Jessie Evans (Eastern Michigan)

Legend

- (C) Team captain
- (S) Suspended
- (I) Ineligible
- (W) Walk-on
- Injured
- Current redshirt

== Schedule ==
Date time, TV	Rank^{#}	Opponent^{#}	Result	Record	Site (attendance) city, state
Regular season
Nov. 22, 1996*	No. 19	vs. No. 7 North Carolina; Hall of Fame Tip-Off Classic	W 83–72	1–0	Springfield Civic Center; Springfield, MA
Nov. 26, 1996*	No. 11	Northern Arizona	W 88–70	2–0	McKale Center; Tucson, AZ
Nov. 30, 1996*	No. 11	at No. 19 New Mexico	L 77–84	2–1	The Pit; Albuquerque, NM
Dec. 7, 1996*	No. 15	vs. No. 3 Utah; John Wooden Classic	W 69–61	3–1	Arrowhead Pond of Anaheim; Anaheim, CA
Dec. 9, 1996*	No. 15	No. 18 Texas	W 83–78	4–1	McKale Center; Tucson, AZ
Dec. 14, 1996*	No. 8	Jackson State	W 111–83	5–1	McKale Center; Tucson, AZ
Dec. 21, 1996*	No. 6	at No. 4 Michigan	L 71–73 ^{OT}	5–2	The Palace of Auburn Hills; Auburn Hills, MI
Dec. 28, 1996*	No. 9	Robert Morris; Bank One Fiesta Bowl Classic	W 118–54	6–2	McKale Center; Tucson, AZ
Dec. 30, 1996*	No. 9	Penn; Bank One Fiesta Bowl Classic	W 93–51	7–2	McKale Center; Tucson, AZ
Jan. 2, 1997	No. 9	California	W 81–80	8–2 (1–0)	McKale Center; Tucson, AZ
Jan. 4, 1997	No. 9	No. 21 Stanford	W 76–75	9–2 (2–0)	McKale Center; Tucson, AZ
Jan. 11, 1997	No. 7	at Arizona State; Rivalry	W 92–84	10–2 (3–0)	Wells Fargo Arena; Tempe, AZ
Jan. 16, 1997	No. 6	at USC	L 62–75	10–3 (3–1)	Los Angeles Sports Arena; Los Angeles, CA
Jan. 18, 1997	No. 6	at UCLA; Rivalry	L 78–84 ^{OT}	10–4 (3–2)	Pauley Pavilion; Los Angeles, CA
Jan. 23, 1997	No. 11	Oregon State	W 99–48	11–4 (4–2)	McKale Center; Tucson, AZ
Jan. 25, 1997	No. 11	Oregon	W 88–68	12–4 (5–2)	McKale Center; Tucson, AZ
Jan. 30, 1997	No. 10	at Washington State	W 87–78	13–4 (6–2)	Beasley Coliseum; Pullman, WA
Feb. 2, 1997	No. 10	at Washington	L 88–92	13–5 (6–3)	Hec Edmundson Pavilion; Seattle, WA
Feb. 5, 1997	No. 14	Arizona State; Rivalry	W 87–71	14–5 (7–3)	McKale Center; Tucson, AZ
Feb. 9, 1997*	No. 14	vs. No. 21 Tulane; 7-Up Shootout	W 81–62	15–5	Veterans Memorial Coliseum; Phoenix, AZ
Feb. 13, 1997	No. 11	No. 24 UCLA; Rivalry	L 64–66	15–6 (7–4)	McKale Center; Tucson, AZ
Feb. 15, 1997	No. 11	USC	W 101–77	16–6 (8–4)	McKale Center; Tucson, AZ
Feb. 20, 1997	No. 13	at Oregon	L 72–78	16–7 (8–5)	McArthur Court; Eugene, OR
Feb. 22, 1997	No. 13	at Oregon State	W 74–64	17–7 (9–5)	Gill Coliseum; Corvallis, OR
Feb. 27, 1997	No. 15	Washington State	W 100–86	18–7 (10–5)	McKale Center; Tucson, AZ
Mar. 2, 1997	No. 15	Washington	W 103–82	19–7 (11–5)	McKale Center; Tucson, AZ
Mar. 6, 1997	No. 12	at No. 23 Stanford	L 80–81	19–8 (11–6)	Maples Pavilion; Stanford, CA
Mar. 8, 1997	No. 12	at California	L 77–79	19–9 (11–7)	Cow Palace (Note: Game played near San Francisco at the Cow Palace, since Cal's Harmon Gym (soon to be renamed Haas Pavilion) was beginning renovation.); Daly City, CA
NCAA tournament
Mar. 13, 1997*	(4 SE) No. 15	vs. (13 SE) South Alabama; First round	W 65–57	20–9	Pyramid Arena; Memphis, TN
Mar. 15, 1997*	(4 SE) No. 15	vs. (12 SE) No. 16 College of Charleston; Second round	W 73–69	21–9	Pyramid Arena; Memphis, TN
Mar. 21, 1997*	(4 SE) No. 15	vs. (1 SE) No. 1 Kansas; Sweet Sixteen	W 85–82	22–9	BJCC Arena; Birmingham, AL
Mar. 23, 1997*	(4 SE) No. 15	vs. (10 SE) Providence; Elite Eight	W 96–92 ^{OT}	23–9	BJCC Arena; Birmingham, AL
Mar. 29, 1997*	(4 SE) No. 15	vs. (1 E) No. 4 North Carolina; Final Four	W 66–58	24–9	RCA Dome; Indianapolis, IN
Mar. 31, 1997*	(4 SE) No. 15	vs. (1 W) No. 5 Kentucky; National Championship	W 84–79 ^{OT}	25–9	RCA Dome; Indianapolis, IN
*Non-conference game. ^{#}Rankings from AP Poll. (#) Tournament seedings in parentheses. SE=Southeast.

== Awards and honors ==
NCAA Tournament, Champions

== Team players drafted into the NBA ==
Year	Round	Pick	Player	NBA club
1998	1	2	Mike Bibby	Vancouver Grizzlies
1998	1	14	Michael Dickerson	Houston Rockets
1998	2	42	Miles Simon	Orlando Magic
1999	1	10	Jason Terry	Atlanta Hawks
1999	2	39	A. J. Bramlett	Cleveland Cavaliers
