= 1993–94 North Carolina A&T Aggies men's basketball team =

American college basketball season

1993–94 North Carolina A&T Aggies men's basketball

MEAC tournament champions

NCAA tournament, first round
- Conference: Mid-Eastern Athletic Conference
- Record: 16–14 (10–6 MEAC)
- Head coach: Jeff Capel (1st season)
- Home arena: Corbett Sports Center

1993–94 MEAC men's basketball standings
	Conf.				Overall
Team	W		L	PCT	W		L	PCT
Coppin State	16	–	0	1.000	22	–	8	.733
Maryland Eastern Shore	10	–	6	.625	16	–	12	.571
South Carolina State	10	–	6	.625	16	–	13	.552
North Carolina A&T †	10	–	6	.625	16	–	14	.533
Bethune–Cookman	8	–	8	.500	9	–	18	.333
Howard	7	–	9	.438	10	–	17	.370
Delaware State	5	–	11	.313	8	–	19	.296
Morgan State	4	–	12	.250	8	–	21	.276
Florida A&M	2	–	14	.125	4	–	23	.148
† 1994 MEAC tournament winner Rankings from AP Poll

The 1993–94 North Carolina A&T Aggies men's basketball team represented North Carolina Agricultural and Technical State University during the 1993–94 NCAA Division I men's basketball season. The Aggies, led by first-year head coach Jeff Capel, played their home games at the Corbett Sports Center as members of the Mid-Eastern Athletic Conference. They finished the season 16–14, 10–6 in MEAC play to finish in second place. They were champions of the MEAC tournament, winning the championship game over South Carolina State, to earn an automatic bid to the 1994 NCAA tournament. Playing as No. 16 seed in the Midwest region, they were defeated by No. 1 seed and eventual National champion Arkansas, 94–79, in the opening round.

== Roster ==
1987–88 North Carolina A&T Aggies men's basketball team
Players	Coaches
Pos. / # / Name / Height / Weight / Year / Hometown; G / / Phillip Allen / 6 ft 2 in (1.88 m) / — / Jr	Head coach: Don Corbett; Assistant coach(es) Legend: (C) Team captain; (S) Suspended; (I) Ineligible; (W) Walk-on; Injured; Current redshirt; Roster

== Schedule and results ==
Date time, TV	Rank^{#}	Opponent^{#}	Result	Record	Site (attendance) city, state
Regular season
Nov 30, 1993*		at No. 17 Georgia Tech	L 77–93	0–1	Alexander Memorial Coliseum; Atlanta, Georgia
Jan 2, 1994*		at Ohio State	L 58–93	1–5	St. John Arena; Columbus, Ohio
Feb 7, 1994*		at Maryland-Eastern Shore	W 88–87 ^{OT}	9–10	Tawes Gymnasium; Princess Anne, Maryland
Feb 14, 1994*		at NC State	L 64–85	10–11	Reynolds Coliseum; Raleigh, North Carolina
MEAC tournament
Mar 9, 1994*		vs. Howard; Quarterfinals	W 61–57 ^{OT}	14–13	Talmadge L. Hill Field House; Baltimore, Maryland
Mar 10, 1994*		vs. Maryland-Eastern Shore; Semifinals	W 76–73	15–13	Talmadge L. Hill Field House; Baltimore, Maryland
Mar 11, 1994*		vs. South Carolina State; Championship game	W 87–70	16–13	Talmadge L. Hill Field House; Baltimore, Maryland
NCAA tournament
Mar 18, 1994*; CBS	(16 MW)	vs. (1 MW) No. 2 Arkansas; First round	L 79–94	16–14	Myriad Convention Center (13,366); Oklahoma City, Oklahoma
*Non-conference game. ^{#}Rankings from AP poll. (#) Tournament seedings in parentheses. MW=Midwest. All times are in Eastern Time.
