= 1996–97 California Golden Bears men's basketball team =

American college basketball season

1996–97 California Golden Bears men's basketball

NCAA tournament, Sweet Sixteen
- Conference: Pacific-10 Conference

Ranking
- Coaches: No. 18
- Record: 23–9 (12–6 Pac-10)
- Head coach: Ben Braun (1st season)
- Assistant coach: Billy Kennedy (4th season)
- Home arena: Harmon Gym

1996–97 Pacific-10 Conference men's basketball standings
	Conf.				Overall
Team	W		L	PCT	W		L	PCT
No. 7 UCLA	15	–	3	.833	24	–	8	.750
No. 21 Stanford	12	–	6	.667	22	–	8	.733
California	12	–	6	.667	23	–	9	.719
USC	12	–	6	.667	17	–	11	.607
No. 15 Arizona	11	–	7	.611	25	–	9	.735
Washington	10	–	8	.556	17	–	11	.607
Oregon	8	–	10	.444	17	–	11	.607
Washington State	5	–	13	.278	13	–	17	.433
Oregon State	3	–	15	.167	7	–	20	.259
Arizona State	2	–	16	.111	10	–	20	.333
Rankings from AP Poll

The 1996–97 California Golden Bears men's basketball team represented the University of California, Berkeley in the 1996–97 season.

Led by head coach Ben Braun, the Bears finished the regular season with a 12–6 record in the Pac-10, placing them in a tie for second. They received an at-large bid to the NCAA tournament, where they made a run to the Sweet Sixteen. The Golden Bears defeated Princeton and Villanova before falling to North Carolina in the East Regional semifinal. The team finished the season with an overall record of 23–9.

== Roster ==
1996–97 California Golden Bears men's basketball team
Players
Coaches

Pos.	#	Name	Height	Weight	Year	Hometown
F	4	Alfred Grigsby	6 ft 9 in (2.06 m)	—	Sr
G	22	Ed Gray	6 ft 3 in (1.91 m)	210 lb (95 kg)	Sr	Riverside, CA
G	23	Randy Duck	6 ft 0 in (1.83 m)	—	Sr
F	34	Tony Gonzalez	6 ft 5 in (1.96 m)	235 lb (107 kg)	Jr	Huntington Beach, CA
F/C	40	Sean Marks	6 ft 10 in (2.08 m)	245 lb (111 kg)	Jr	Auckland, New Zealand
F	44	Michael Stewart	6 ft 10 in (2.08 m)	220 lb (100 kg)	Sr	Sacramento, CA

Head coach

- Ben Braun

Assistant coach(es)

- Billy Kennedy (Southeastern Louisiana)

Legend

- (C) Team captain
- (S) Suspended
- (I) Ineligible
- (W) Walk-on
- Injured
- Current redshirt

== Schedule and results ==
Date time, TV	Rank^{#}	Opponent^{#}	Result	Record	Site city, state
Regular season
Nov 25, 1996*; ESPN		vs. Iowa; Maui Invitational Tournament	W 75–59	1–0	Lahaina Civic Center; Maui, Hawaii
Nov 26, 1996*		vs. No. 2 Kansas; Maui Invitational Tournament	L 67–85	1–1	Lahaina Civic Center; Maui, Hawaii
Nov 27, 1996*		vs. No. 17 UMass; Maui Invitational Tournament	W 59–55	2–1	Lahaina Civic Center; Maui, Hawaii
Nov 30, 1996*		Texas Southern	W 97–60	3–1	Harmon Gym; Berkeley, California
Dec 3, 1996*		Illinois	W 89–88 ^{2OT}	4–1	Harmon Gym (6,578); Berkeley, California
Dec 8, 1996*		at Maryland	L 64–80	4–2	Cole Fieldhouse; College Park, Maryland
Dec 9, 1996*		vs. Mississippi State	W 78–45	5–2	U.S. Airways Arena; Landover, Maryland
Dec 20, 1996*		vs. Penn State	W 76–63	6–2	Continental Airlines Arena; East Rutherford, New Jersey
Dec 23, 1996*		San Francisco	W 78–63	7–2	Harmon Gym; Berkeley, California
Dec 28, 1996*		Howard	W 86–61	8–2	Harmon Gym; Berkeley, California
Dec 29, 1996*		Cal Poly	W 77–59	9–2	Harmon Gym; Berkeley, California
Jan 2, 1997		at No. 9 Arizona	L 80–81	9–3 (0–1)	McKale Center; Tucson, Arizona
Jan 4, 1997		at Arizona State	L 60–64	9–4 (0–2)	ASU Activity Center; Tempe, Arizona
Jan 9, 1997		USC	W 83–71	10–4 (1–2)	Harmon Gym; Berkeley, California
Jan 11, 1997		UCLA	L 56–64	10–5 (1–3)	Harmon Gym; Berkeley, California
Jan 16, 1997		at Oregon State	W 80–70	11–5 (2–3)	Gill Coliseum; Corvallis, Oregon
Jan 18, 1997		at No. 24 Oregon	W 73–62	12–5 (3–3)	McArthur Court; Eugene, Oregon
Jan 23, 1997		Washington State	W 77–75 ^{2OT}	13–5 (4–3)	Harmon Gym; Berkeley, California
Jan 25, 1997		Washington	W 80–52	14–5 (5–3)	Harmon Gym; Berkeley, California
Jan 29, 1997		No. 15 Stanford	W 70–64	15–5 (6–3)	Harmon Gym; Berkeley, California
Feb 6, 1997		at UCLA	W 71–68	16–5 (7–3)	Pauley Pavilion; Los Angeles, California
Feb 8, 1997		at USC	L 85–93	16–6 (7–4)	L.A. Sports Arena; Los Angeles, California
Feb 13, 1997		Oregon	W 73–66	17–6 (8–4)	Harmon Gym; Berkeley, California
Feb 15, 1997		Oregon State	W 90–68	18–6 (9–4)	Harmon Gym; Berkeley, California
Feb 20, 1997	No. 25	at Washington	W 78–67	19–6 (10–4)	Bank of America Arena; Seattle, Washington
Feb 22, 1997	No. 25	at Washington State	L 87–89	19–7 (10–5)	Friel Court; Pullman, Washington
Mar 1, 1997		at No. 25 Stanford	L 63–73	19–8 (10–6)	Maples Pavilion; Stanford, California
Mar 6, 1997		Arizona State	W 84–66	20–8 (11–6)	Harmon Gym; Berkeley, California
Mar 8, 1997		vs. No. 12 Arizona	W 79–77	21–8 (12–6)	Cow Palace; Daly City, California
NCAA Tournament
Mar 13, 1997*	(5 E)	vs. (12 E) Princeton; First round	W 55–52	22–8	Lawrence Joel Coliseum; Winston-Salem, North Carolina
Mar 15, 1997*	(5 E)	vs. (4 E) No. 20 Villanova; Second Round	W 75–68	23–8	Lawrence Joel Coliseum; Winston-Salem, North Carolina
Mar 21, 1997*	(5 E)	vs. (1 E) No. 4 North Carolina; East Regional semifinal – Sweet Sixteen	L 57–63	23–9	Carrier Dome; Syracuse, New York
*Non-conference game. ^{#}Rankings from AP Poll. (#) Tournament seedings in parentheses. E=East. All times are in Pacific.

== Team players drafted into the NBA ==
Round	Pick	Player	NBA team
1	22	Ed Gray	Atlanta Hawks
