= 1997 CAA men's basketball tournament =

Virginia Basketball tournament

- Classification: Division I
- Season: 1996–97
- Teams: 9
- Site: Richmond Coliseum; Richmond, Virginia
- Champions: Old Dominion (5th title)
- Winning coach: Jeff Capel II (2nd title)
- MVP: Odell Hodge (Richmond)
- Television: ESPN

1996–97 CAA men's basketball standings
	Conf.				Overall
Team	W		L	PCT	W		L	PCT
Old Dominion †	10	–	6	.625	22	–	11	.667
UNC Wilmington	10	–	6	.625	16	–	14	.533
East Carolina	9	–	7	.563	17	–	10	.630
VCU	9	–	7	.563	14	–	13	.519
William & Mary	8	–	8	.500	12	–	16	.429
James Madison	8	–	8	.500	16	–	13	.552
American	7	–	9	.438	11	–	16	.407
Richmond	7	–	9	.438	13	–	15	.464
George Mason	4	–	12	.250	10	–	17	.370
† 1997 CAA tournament winner Rankings from AP poll

The 1997 CAA men's basketball tournament was held February 28–March 3, 1997, at the Richmond Coliseum in Richmond, Virginia. The winner of the tournament was Old Dominion, who received an automatic bid to the 1997 NCAA Men's Division I Basketball Tournament.

== Bracket ==
First round Friday, February 28
8	Richmond	85
9	George Mason	57

Quarterfinals; Saturday, March 1
1	Old Dominion	69
8	Richmond	56
4	VCU	63
5	William & Mary	77
2	UNC Wilmington	54
7	American	50
3	East Carolina	67^{2OT}
6	James Madison	69

Semifinals; Sunday, March 2
1	Old Dominion	70
5	William & Mary	62
2	UNC Wilmington	57
6	James Madison	60

Final; Monday, March 3
1	Old Dominion	62
6	James Madison	58^{OT}

== Honors ==
CAA All-Tournament Team	Player	School
CAA All-Tournament Team	Odell Hodge	Old Dominion
CAA All-Tournament Team	Eugene Atkinson	James Madison
CAA All-Tournament Team	Randy Bracy	William & Mary
CAA All-Tournament Team	Mike Byers	Old Dominion
CAA All-Tournament Team	Brion Dunlap	Old Dominion
CAA All-Tournament Team	Chatney Howard	James Madison
