= 1997 WAC men's basketball tournament =

- Classification: Division I
- Season: 1996–97
- Teams: 12
- Site: Thomas & Mack Center; Paradise, NV
- Champions: Utah (2nd title)
- Winning coach: Rick Majerus (2nd title)
- MVP: Keith Van Horn (Utah)

1996–97 WAC men's basketball standings
	Conf.				Overall
Team	W		L	PCT	W		L	PCT
Mountain
No. 2 Utah †	15	–	1	.938	29	–	4	.879
Tulsa	12	–	4	.750	24	–	10	.706
No. 11 New Mexico	11	–	5	.688	25	–	8	.758
TCU	7	–	9	.438	22	–	13	.629
SMU	7	–	9	.438	16	–	12	.571
Rice	6	–	10	.375	12	–	15	.444
UTEP	6	–	10	.375	13	–	13	.500
BYU	0	–	16	.000	1	–	25	.038
Pacific
Fresno State	12	–	4	.750	20	–	12	.625
Hawaii	12	–	4	.750	21	–	8	.724
UNLV	11	–	5	.688	22	–	10	.688
Colorado State	10	–	6	.625	20	–	9	.690
Wyoming	8	–	8	.500	12	–	16	.429
San Jose State	5	–	11	.313	13	–	14	.481
San Diego State	4	–	12	.250	12	–	15	.444
Air Force	2	–	14	.125	7	–	19	.269
† 1997 WAC tournament winner Rankings from AP poll

The 1997 Western Athletic Conference men's basketball tournament was held March 4–8 at the Thomas & Mack Center at the University of Nevada, Las Vegas in Paradise, Nevada.

Top-seeded Utah easily defeated tenth-seeded TCU in the championship game, 89–68, to clinch their second WAC men's tournament championship.

The Utes, in turn, received an automatic bid to the 1997 NCAA Division I tournament. Utah would ultimately defeat Navy, UNC Charlotte, and Stanford on their way to the Elite Eight, where they lost to Kentucky. They were joined in the tournament by Tulsa and New Mexico, who earned at-large bids.

== Format ==
Prior to the 1997 season, the WAC added six new members: Rice, SMU, San Jose State, TCU, Tulsa, and UNLV. With the additions, total conference membership increased to sixteen teams. The regular season schedule was re-arranged so that teams were placed into one of two eight-team divisions, the Mountain and Pacific Divisions, generally determined by geography.

The tournament field was subsequently expanded from ten to twelve teams, with the top six teams from each of the two divisions qualifying for the tournament. Teams' seeds were determined based on their finish in the standings, and were seeded one to six within their division. The teams who finished in the top two in either of the divisions received byes to the second round while the remaining eight teams were placed in the first round. Each team was initially matched up with a team from the other division (3rd versus 6th and 4th versus 5th).

== Bracket ==
First round Tuesday, March 4
M5	SMU	93
P4	Colorado State	89
M3	#14 New Mexico	103
P6	San Jose State	70
M6	Rice	61
P3	UNLV	71
P5	Wyoming	61
M4	TCU	72

Quarterfinals; Thursday, March 6
M1	#3 Utah	59
M5	SMU	58
M3	#14 New Mexico	65
P2	Hawaii	57
M2	Tulsa	68
P3	UNLV	65
M4	TCU	106
P1	Fresno State	81

Semifinals; Friday, March 7
M1	#3 Utah	72
M3	#14 New Mexico	70
M2	Tulsa	59
M4	TCU	64

Championship; Saturday, March 8
M1	#3 Utah	89
M4	TCU	68
