= 1996–97 Washington Huskies men's basketball team =

American college basketball season

1996–97 Washington Huskies men's basketball

National Invitation Tournament, First round
- Conference: Pacific-10 Conference
- Record: 17–11 (10–8 Pac-10)
- Head coach: Bob Bender (4th season)
- Assistant coach: Ray Giacoletti
- Home arena: Hec Edmundson Pavilion

1996–97 Pacific-10 Conference men's basketball standings
	Conf.				Overall
Team	W		L	PCT	W		L	PCT
No. 7 UCLA	15	–	3	.833	24	–	8	.750
No. 21 Stanford	12	–	6	.667	22	–	8	.733
California	12	–	6	.667	23	–	9	.719
USC	12	–	6	.667	17	–	11	.607
No. 15 Arizona	11	–	7	.611	25	–	9	.735
Washington	10	–	8	.556	17	–	11	.607
Oregon	8	–	10	.444	17	–	11	.607
Washington State	5	–	13	.278	13	–	17	.433
Oregon State	3	–	15	.167	7	–	20	.259
Arizona State	2	–	16	.111	10	–	20	.333
Rankings from AP Poll

The 1996–97 Washington Huskies men's basketball team represented the University of Washington for the 1996–97 NCAA Division I men's basketball season. Led by fourth-year head coach Bob Bender, the Huskies were members of the Pacific-10 Conference and played their home games on campus at Hec Edmundson Pavilion in Seattle, Washington.

The Huskies were 17–10 overall in the regular season and 10–8 in conference play, sixth in the standings. There was no conference tournament this season; last played in 1990, it resumed in 2002.

Washington played in the National Invitation Tournament for the second straight year and lost by four points at Nebraska.

== Postseason result ==
Date time, TV	Opponent	Result	Record	Site (attendance) city, state
National Invitation Tournament
Wed, March 12*; 5:05 pm	at Nebraska; First round	L 63–67	17–11	Devaney Center (6,015); Lincoln, Nebraska
*Non-conference game. ^{#}Rankings from AP poll. (#) Tournament seedings in parentheses. All times are in Pacific time.
