= Coppin State Eagles men's basketball statistical leaders =

The Coppin State Eagles men's basketball statistical leaders are individual statistical leaders of the Coppin State Eagles men's basketball program in various categories, including points, rebounds, assists, steals, and blocks. Within those areas, the lists identify single-game, single-season, and career leaders. The Eagles represent Coppin State University in the NCAA's Mid-Eastern Athletic Conference.

Coppin State began competing in intercollegiate basketball in 1964. The NCAA did not officially record assists as a stat until the 1983–84 season, and blocks and steals until the 1985–86 season, but Coppin State's record books includes players in these stats before these seasons. These lists are updated through the end of the 2020–21 season.

== Scoring ==
Career
Rk	Player	Points	Seasons
1	Tywain McKee	2,158	2005–06 2006–07 2007–08 2008–09
2	Reggie Isaac	1,938	1988–89 1989–90 1990–91
3	Larry Stewart	1,824	1988–89 1989–90 1990–91
4	Tony Carter	1,585	1975–76 1976–77
5	Dejuan Clayton	1,518	2016–17 2017–18 2018–19 2019–20 2020–21
6	Larry Tucker	1,449	1999–00 2000–01 2001–02 2002–03
7	Antoine Brockington	1,448	1995–96 1996–97 1997–98
8	Sidney Goodman	1,412	1991–92 1992–93 1993–94 1994–95
9	Stephen Stewart	1,393	1992–93 1993–94 1994–95
10	Joe Pace	1,313	1974–75 1975–76

Season
Rk	Player	Points	Season
1	Tony Carter	894	1975–76
2	Joe Pace	797	1975–76
3	Larry Stewart	716	1990–91
4	Reggie Isaac	712	1990–91
5	Reggie Isaac	699	1989–90
6	Tony Carter	691	1976–77
7	Sam Sessoms	655	2022–23
8	Larry Stewart	619	1989–90
9	Fred Warrick	605	1998–99
10	Tywain McKee	590	2008–09
	Antoine Brockington	590	1997–98

Single game
Rk	Player	Points	Season	Opponent
1	Tony Carter	46	1975–76	Bowie St
2	Joe Pace	43	1975–76	Henderson St
3	Tony Carter	41	1975–76	St. Mary's
4	Fred Warrick	40	1998–99	Howard
	Larry Stewart	40	1990–91	S. Carolina St
6	James Jackson	39	1984–85	Lincoln
7	Tony Carter	38	1975–76	Southeastern
	Greg Vaughn	38	1978–79	Barber-Scotia
9	Justin Winston	37	2023–24	UMBC
	Sam Sessoms	37	2022–23	Howard
	Terquin Mott	37	1995–96	Delaware St
	Larry Stewart	37	1990–91	Florida A&M
	James Hayes	37	1977–78	Bowie State

== Rebounds ==
Career
Rk	Player	Rebounds	Seasons
1	Larry Stewart	1,052	1988–89 1989–90 1990–91
2	Joe Pace	978	1974–75 1975–76
3	Larry McCollum	644	1987–88 1988–89 1989–90 1990–91
4	Michael Murray	631	2010–11 2011–12 2012–13 2013–14
5	Mark Carroll	630	1983–84 1984–85 1985–86 1986–87
6	Larry Tucker	622	1999–00 2000–01 2001–02 2002–03
7	Tywain McKee	593	2005–06 2006–07 2007–08 2008–09
8	Tariq Saunders	576	1990–91 1991–92 1992–93 1994–95
9	Stephen Stewart	546	1992–93 1993–94 1994–95
10	Earl Lee	541	1982–83 1985–86 1986–87

Season
Rk	Player	Rebounds	Season
1	Joe Pace	670	1975–76
2	Larry Stewart	403	1990–91
3	Larry Stewart	369	1989–90
4	Joe Pace	308	1974–75
5	Larry Stewart	280	1988–89
6	Michael Murray	277	2012–13
7	Brendan Medley-Bacon	276	2019–20
8	Antonio Williams	255	2011–12
9	Terquin Mott	250	1996–97
10	Darryl Proctor	234	2005–06

Single game
Rk	Player	Rebounds	Season	Opponent
1	Joe Pace	32	1975–76	Federal City
2	Terry Davis	28	1972–73	St. Mary's
3	Joe Pace	25	1975–76	Mount St. Mary's
4	Brendan Medley-Bacon	24	2019–20	Morgan State
5	Joe Pace	22	1975–76	George Mason
	Tyree Corbett	22	2021–22	South Carolina State
	Tyree Corbett	22	2021–22	Howard
8	Larry Stewart	21	1990–91	Florida A&M
	Larry Stewart	21	1990–91	New Mexico State
	Antonio Williams	21	2011–12	Hampton

== Assists ==
Career
Rk	Player	Assists	Seasons
1	Larry Yarbray	622	1988–89 1989–90 1990–91 1991–92
2	Taariq Cephas	451	2011–12 2012–13 2013–14 2014–15
3	Dejuan Clayton	420	2016–17 2017–18 2018–19 2019–20 2020–21
4	Tywain McKee	406	2005–06 2006–07 2007–08 2008–09
5	Steve Miller	367	1983–84 1984–85 1985–86 1986–87
6	Sidney Goodman	361	1991–92 1992–93 1993–94 1994–95
7	Allen Watson	358	1993–94 1994–95 1995–96
8	Rasheem Sims	326	1998–99 1999–00 2000–01 2001–02
9	Will Crandall	303	1986–87 1987–88
10	Vince Goldsberry	285	2007–08 2008–09 2009–10 2010–11

Season
Rk	Player	Assists	Season
1	Gary Barnes	398	1975–76
2	Larry Yarbray	225	1989–90
3	Tony Carter	224	1975–76
4	Allen Watson	186	1995–96
5	Will Crandall	164	1987–88
6	Larry Yarbray	161	1990–91
	Sam Sessoms	161	2022–23
8	Larry Yarbray	156	1988–89
9	Taariq Cephas	151	2014–15
10	Karonn Davis	146	2017–18

Single game
Rk	Player	Assists	Season	Opponent
1	Gary Barnes	17	1975–76	Rutgers-Camden
2	Larry Yarbray	16	1989–90	S. Carolina State
	Larry Yarbray	16	1988–89	Bethune-Cookman
4	Larry Yarbray	15	1989–90	Florida A&M
5	Larry Yarbray	13	1990–91	N. Carolina A&T

== Steals ==
Career
Rk	Player	Steals	Seasons
1	Tywain McKee	253	2005–06 2006–07 2007–08 2008–09
2	Sidney Goodman	233	1991–92 1992–93 1993–94 1994–95
3	Steve Miller	205	1983–84 1984–85 1985–86 1986–87
4	Larry Yarbray	194	1988–89 1989–90 1990–91 1991–92
5	Nendah Tarke	182	2020–21 2021–22 2022–23
6	Antoine Brockington	174	1995–96 1996–97 1997–98
7	Vince Goldsberry	163	2007–08 2008–09 2009–10 2010–11
8	Keith Carmichael	156	1991–92 1992–93 1993–94 1994–95
9	Taariq Cephas	149	2011–12 2012–13 2013–14 2014–15
10	Arnold Ross	143	1981–82 1982–83 1983–84 1984–85

Season
Rk	Player	Steals	Season
1	Jeff Churchwell	132	1983–84
2	Nendah Tarke	94	2021–22
3	Tywain McKee	91	2008–09
4	Toby Nnadozie	76	2024–25
5	Danny Singletary	75	1997–98
6	Antoine Brockington	67	1997–98
7	Sidney Goodman	66	1993–94
	Keith Mercer	66	1984–85
	Kevin Brisbon	66	1982–83
10	Danny Singletary	65	1996–97

Single game
Rk	Player	Steals	Season	Opponent
1	Jeff Churchwell	12	1983–84	UMES
2	Toby Nnadozie	8	2024–25	Cheyney (PA)
	Jesse Zarzuela	8	2021–22	UNC Greensboro
	Antoine Brockington	8	1997–98	Florida A&M
	Danny Singletary	8	1996–97	Kent State
	Allen Watson	8	1995–96	Delaware State
	Jeff Churchwell	8	1983–84	Davis & Elkins

== Blocks ==
Career
Rk	Player	Blocks	Seasons
1	Michael Thomas	198	1992–93 1993–94 1994–95
2	Larry Stewart	149	1988–89 1989–90 1990–91
3	Henry Colter	144	2001–02 2002–03 2003–04 2004–05
4	Larry McCollum	138	1987–88 1988–89 1989–90 1990–91
5	Tyran Watkins	95	1996–97 1997–98 1998–99 1999–00
6	Phil Booth	94	1987–88 1988–89 1989–90
7	Robert Pressey	90	2004–05 2005–06 2006–07 2007–08
8	Mark Carroll	86	1983–84 1984–85 1985–86 1986–87
9	Justin Steers	83	2018–19 2021–22 2022–23
10	Brendan Medley-Bacon	82	2018–19 2019–20

Season
Rk	Player	Blocks	Season
1	Michael Thomas	80	1993–94
2	Michael Thomas	77	1994–95
3	Brendan Medley-Bacon	66	2019–20
4	Henry Colter	57	2003–04
5	Larry Stewart	53	1988–89
6	Larry Stewart	52	1990–91
7	Larry Stewart	44	1989–90
8	Anthony Tarke	42	2020–21
9	Michael Thomas	41	1992–93
10	Tyran Watkins	40	1999–00
	Larry McCollum	40	1987–88

Single game
Rk	Player	Blocks	Season	Opponent
1	Joe Pace	15	1974–75	Barber-Scotia
2	Joe Pace	9	1975–76	Texas Southern
3	Michael Thomas	8	1994–95	Howard
4	Brendan Medley-Bacon	7	2019–20	NC Central
	Joe Pace	7	1975–76	George Mason
6	Henry Colter	6	2003–04	New Mexico
