= Washington Congressionals =

- League: USBL
- Founded: 1998
- Dissolved: 2000
- History: Washington Congressionals; 1998-2000
- Location: Washington, D.C.
- Team colors: blue, yellow, white

The Washington Congressionals was a professional basketball club in the United States Basketball League (USBL) from 1998 to 2000.

== History ==
The team was based in Washington, D.C.. Congressionals started their first season under coach Mike McLeese. They qualified for the play-off only in 1998, when they were eliminated in the first round. Despite their positive first season, they did not managed to qualify to the play-offs in 1999 and 2000. The club disbanded after the 2000 season.

Notable players like streetball legend in the Washington, D.C., and Maryland areas, Curt Smith, Moochie Norris, Craig Hodges, Kevin Thompson, Lonnie Harrell and Senegalese Sitapha Savané played for the franchise.

== Seasons ==
Stagione	League	Name	W	L	%	Place	Play-off	Coach
1998	USBL	Washington Congressionals	17	9	65,4	2º	Second round	Mike McLeese
1999	USBL	Washington Congressionals	3	24	11,1	5º	-	Mike McLeese; Jacob Jonas
2000	USBL	Washington Congressionals	10	20	33,3	6º	-	Mike Sanders

== Home arenas ==
- Bender Arena at American University, cap: 4,500 (Washington, D.C.) 1998
- Blair High School, (Silver Spring, Maryland) 1999
- Smith Center at George Washington University, cap: 5,000 (Silver Spring, Maryland) 1999–2000
- University of the District of Columbia, (Washington, D.C.) 2000

== Rosters ==
=== 1998 season ===
- Greg Jones, Lonnie Harrell, Mike Powell, Curt Smith, Sonique Nixon, Jermall Morgan, Art Crowder, Keith Davis, Darryl Prue, Moochie Norris, James Johns, Antoine Brockington.

=== 1999 season ===
- Art Crowder, Bill Burnett, Greg Jones, Jermall Morgan, Moochie Norris, Lonnie Harrell, Kevin Sams, Harold Deane, Earl Tyson, Deng Leek, Brian Watkins, Antoine Brockington.

=== 2000 season ===
- Marquis Melton, Damon Watlington, Kavossy Franklin, Sheik Pearson, Michael Tabb, Antonio Reynolds-Dean, Wayne Houston, Willie Farley, Greg Harris, Eric Poole, Jeremy Hyatt, Clayton Shields, Sitapha Savane, Curt Smith, Jermall Morgan, Konata Springer, Antric Klaiber.
