= 1996–97 Coppin State Eagles men's basketball team =

American college basketball season

1996–97 Coppin State Eagles men's basketball
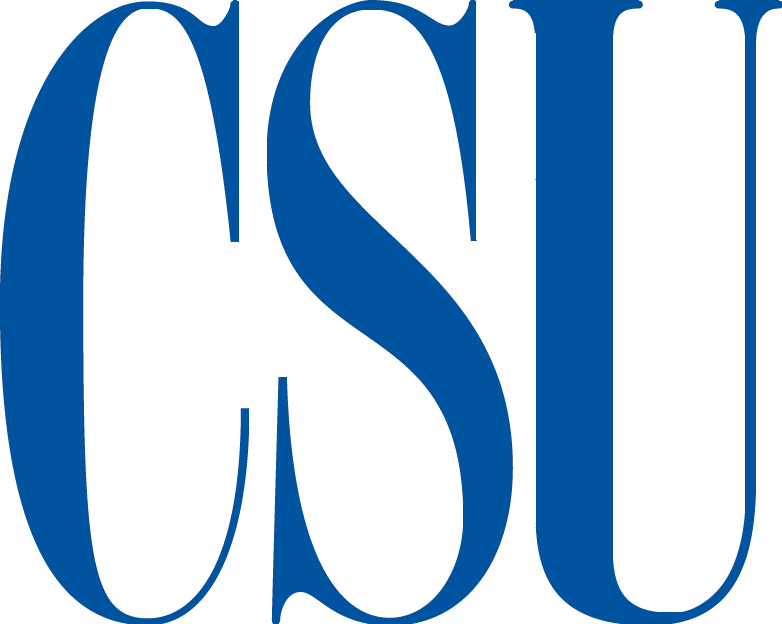

MEAC regular season champions MEAC tournament champions

NCAA tournament, second round
- Conference: Mid-Eastern Athletic Conference
- Record: 22–9 (15–3 MEAC)
- Head coach: Fang Mitchell (11th season)
- Home arena: Coppin Center

1996–97 MEAC men's basketball standings
	Conf.				Overall
Team	W		L	PCT	W		L	PCT
Coppin State †	15	–	3	.833	22	–	9	.710
South Carolina State	12	–	6	.667	14	–	14	.500
North Carolina A&T	11	–	7	.611	15	–	13	.536
Bethune–Cookman	9	–	9	.500	12	–	16	.429
Morgan State	8	–	10	.444	9	–	18	.333
Florida A&M	8	–	10	.444	8	–	19	.296
Hampton	7	–	11	.389	8	–	19	.296
Delaware State	7	–	11	.389	7	–	20	.259
Howard	7	–	11	.389	7	–	20	.259
Maryland Eastern Shore	6	–	12	.333	11	–	17	.393
† 1997 MEAC tournament winner Rankings from AP Poll

The 1996–97 Coppin State Eagles men's basketball team represented Coppin State University during the 1996–97 NCAA Division I men's basketball season. The Eagles, led by 11th year head coach Fang Mitchell, played their home games at the Coppin Center and were members of the Mid-Eastern Athletic Conference. They finished the season 22–9, 15–3 in MEAC play to win the conference regular season title. The Eagles then went on to win the MEAC tournament title to receive an automatic bid to the NCAA tournament as the No. 15 seed in the East region. In the opening round, Coppin State became the third No. 15 seed to win an NCAA Tournament game, and the first to do so by double digits, as they defeated No. 2 seed South Carolina 78–65. The Eagles narrowly missed out on becoming the first No. 15 seed to reach the Sweet Sixteen when they lost in the second round to No. 10 seed Texas, 82–81.

== Roster ==
1996–97 Coppin State Eagles men's basketball team
Players
Coaches

Pos.	#	Name	Height	Weight	Year	Previous school	Hometown
G		Antoine Brockington	6 ft 2 in (1.88 m)	—	Jr	Northeast	Philadelphia, Pennsylvania
C		Terquin Mott	6 ft 8 in (2.03 m)	245 lb (111 kg)	Sr	La Salle	Philadelphia, Pennsylvania
G		Danny Singletary	6 ft 0 in (1.83 m)	—	Jr

Head coach

- Fang Mitchell

Assistant coach(es)

Legend

- (C) Team captain
- (S) Suspended
- (I) Ineligible
- (W) Walk-on
- Injured
- Current redshirt

== Schedule and results ==
Date time, TV	Rank^{#}	Opponent^{#}	Result	Record	Site (attendance) city, state
Regular season
Nov 30, 1996*		at Oklahoma	L 64–88	0–1	Lloyd Noble Center; Norman, Oklahoma
Dec 6, 1996*		at Nebraska; Ameritas Classic	L 72–88	0–2	Bob Devaney Sports Center; Lincoln, Nebraska
Dec 7, 1996*		vs. Colgate; Ameritas Classic	W 69–59	1–2	Bob Devaney Sports Center; Lincoln, Nebraska
Dec 10, 1996*		Duquesne	W 91–57	2–2	Coppin Center; Baltimore, Maryland
Dec 12, 1996*		at Kansas State	L 80–84 ^{OT}	2–3	Bramlage Coliseum; Manhattan, Kansas
Dec 14, 1996*		at Illinois	L 55–91	2–4	Assembly Hall (14,269); Champaign, Illinois
Dec 27, 1996*		vs. Weber State; Oldsmobile Spartan Classic	L 91–92 ^{OT}	2–5	Breslin Center; East Lansing, Michigan
Dec 28, 1996*		vs. Kent State; Oldsmobile Spartan Classic	W 77–66	3–5	Breslin Center; East Lansing, Michigan
Jan 9, 1997		at South Carolina State	L 88–92	3–6 (0–1)	SHM Memorial Center; Orangeburg, South Carolina
Jan 11, 1997		at Hampton	W 76–69	4–6 (1–1)	Convocation Center; Hampton, Virginia
Jan 15, 1997		North Carolina A&T	L 70–76	4–7 (1–2)	Coppin Center; Baltimore, Maryland
Jan 18, 1997		Hampton	W 81–61	5–7 (2–2)	Coppin Center; Baltimore, Maryland
Jan 20, 1997		at Maryland Eastern Shore	W 85–79	6–7 (3–2)	Tawes Gymnasium; Princess Anne, Maryland
Jan 25, 1997		Florida A&M	W 84–67	7–7 (4–2)	Coppin Center; Baltimore, Maryland
Jan 27, 1997		Bethune-Cookman	W 63–62	8–7 (5–2)	Coppin Center; Baltimore, Maryland
Jan 30, 1997		at Howard	W 93–79	9–7 (6–2)	Burr Gymnasium; Washington, D.C.
Feb 1, 1997		at Morgan State	W 81–56	10–7 (7–2)	Hill Field House; Baltimore, Maryland
Feb 5, 1997		at Delaware State	W 90–83 ^{OT}	11–7 (8–2)	Memorial Hall; Dover, Delaware
Feb 8, 1997		Morgan State	W 82–68	12–7 (9–2)	Coppin Center; Baltimore, Maryland
Feb 10, 1997		Howard	W 96–66	13–7 (10–2)	Coppin Center; Baltimore, Maryland
Feb 12, 1997		Delaware State	W 88–66	14–7 (11–2)	Coppin Center; Baltimore, Maryland
Feb 15, 1997		at Florida A&M	L 82–86	14–8 (11–3)	Gaither Athletic Center; Tallahassee, Florida
Feb 17, 1997		at Bethune-Cookman	W 73–56	15–8 (12–3)	Moore Gymnasium; Daytona Beach, Florida
Feb 20, 1997		South Carolina State	W 75–70 ^{OT}	16–8 (13–3)	Coppin Center; Baltimore, Maryland
Feb 26, 1997		at North Carolina A&T	W 61–57	17–8 (14–3)	Corbett Sports Center; Greensboro, North Carolina
Mar 1, 1997		Maryland Eastern Shore	W 80–62	18–8 (15–3)	Coppin Center; Baltimore, Maryland
MEAC tournament
Mar 5, 1997*	(1)	vs. (9) Maryland Eastern Shore; Quarterfinals	W 90–88 ^{OT}	19–8	Echols Memorial Hall; Norfolk, Virginia
Mar 7, 1997*	(1)	vs. (4) Bethune-Cookman; Semifinals	W 76–60	20–8	Echols Memorial Hall; Norfolk, Virginia
Mar 8, 1997*	(1)	vs. (3) North Carolina A&T; Championship	W 81–74 ^{OT}	21–8	Echols Memorial Hall; Norfolk, Virginia
NCAA tournament
Mar 14, 1997*	(15 E)	vs. (2 E) No. 6 South Carolina; First Round	W 78–65	22–8	Civic Arena; Pittsburgh, Pennsylvania
Mar 16, 1997*	(15 E)	vs. (10 E) Texas; Second Round	L 81–82	22–9	Civic Arena; Pittsburgh, Pennsylvania
*Non-conference game. ^{#}Rankings from AP Poll. (#) Tournament seedings in parentheses. E=East. All times are in Eastern Time.
