= Curt Smith (basketball) =

American basketball player (born 1971)

Personal information
- Born: February 4, 1971 (age 55) Washington, D.C.
- Listed height: 5 ft 10 in (1.78 m)
- Listed weight: 185 lb (84 kg)

Career information
- High school: Coolidge Senior (Washington, D.C.)
- College: Compton College (1990–1992); Drake (1992–1994)
- NBA draft: 1994: undrafted
- Position: Point guard

Career history
- 1994–1995: Miami Tropics
- 1996: Treasure Coast Tropics
- 1997: Jacksonville Barracudas
- 1997–1998: Des Moines Dragons
- 1998: Washington Congressionals
- 1998–1999: Des Moines Dragons
- 1999: Connecticut Skyhawks
- 1999–2000: Des Moines Dragons

Career highlights
- IBA assists leader (1999); USBL MVP (1998); USBL assists leader (1998); MVC Player of the Year (1993)

Curt "Trouble" Smith (born February 4, 1971) is an American former basketball player best known as a streetball legend in the Washington, D.C., and Maryland areas. He played college basketball at Compton College and then Drake University. While at Drake, Smith was named the Missouri Valley Conference Men's Basketball Player of the Year as a junior in 1992–93.

In high school, Smith was an All-American who was chosen to play in the Capital Classic in 1989, which was the premier All-American showcase game at the time. He matched up opposite Kenny Anderson, who was considered the best high school basketball player ever (pre-LeBron James), yet Smith outplayed him.

Smith then spent his first two college basketball seasons playing at Compton College, now called El Camino College, in Compton, California. After lighting it up at the junior college level—he once scored 48 points against Harbor Community College—he moved on to play NCAA Division I ball at Drake. During his first season playing for the Bulldogs, Smith was named the Missouri Valley Conference's Newcomer of the Year as well as its player of the year, earning the rare double honor. That season he averaged approximately 21 points, 5 assists and 3 steals per game while helping to turn the program around after bad seasons the previous years.

He did not return to Drake as a senior in 1993–94. After college he played professional basketball, including stints in the IBA, International Basketball League and United States Basketball League. In 1997–98, Smith was named the Most Valuable Player of the USBL.

Kevin Durant of the NBA has described Smith as the best basketball player ever to come out of the Washington metropolitan area.
