= 1989–90 Coppin State Eagles men's basketball team =

American college basketball season

1989–90 Coppin State Eagles men's basketball
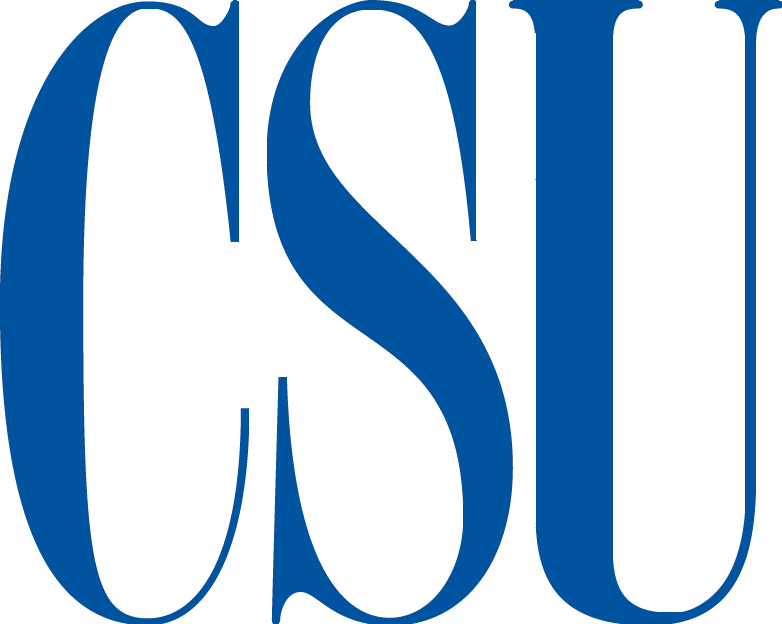

MEAC Regular season champions MEAC tournament champions

NCAA tournament
- Conference: Mid-Eastern Athletic Conference
- Record: 26–7 (15–1 MEAC)
- Head coach: Fang Mitchell (4th season)
- Home arena: Coppin Center

1989–90 MEAC men's basketball standings
	Conf.				Overall
Team	W		L	PCT	W		L	PCT
Coppin State †	15	–	1	.938	26	–	7	.788
Florida A&M	13	–	3	.813	18	–	11	.621
Delaware State	9	–	7	.563	14	–	14	.500
South Carolina State	8	–	8	.500	13	–	16	.448
Bethune–Cookman	8	–	8	.500	10	–	18	.357
North Carolina A&T	6	–	10	.375	12	–	17	.414
Howard	5	–	11	.313	8	–	19	.296
Maryland Eastern Shore	4	–	12	.250	10	–	17	.370
Morgan State	4	–	12	.250	8	–	20	.286
† 1990 MEAC tournament winner Rankings from AP Poll

The 1989–90 Coppin State Eagles men's basketball team represented Coppin State University during the 1989–90 NCAA Division I men's basketball season. The Eagles, led by 4th year head coach Fang Mitchell, played their home games at the Coppin Center and were members of the Mid-Eastern Athletic Conference. They finished the season 26–7, 15–1 in MEAC play to win the conference regular season title. The Eagles then went on to win the MEAC tournament title to receive an automatic bid to the NCAA tournament – the first in school history – as No. 15 seed in the Southeast region. Coppin State lost in the first round to No. 2 seed Syracuse, 70–48.

== Roster ==
1989–90 Coppin State Eagles men's basketball team
Players
Coaches

Pos.	#	Name	Height	Weight	Year	Previous school	Hometown
G	21	Reggie Isaac	6 ft 6 in (1.98 m)	—	Jr		Philadelphia, Pennsylvania
F	33	Larry Stewart	6 ft 8 in (2.03 m)	215 lb (98 kg)	Jr	Dobbins Technical	Philadelphia, Pennsylvania
G	4	Larry Yarbray	6 ft 0 in (1.83 m)	—	So		Chester, Pennsylvania
G	22	Michael Johnson	6 ft 2 in (1.88 m)	—	Fr
G	24	Derreck Orr	6 ft 4 in (1.93 m)	—	Sr		Philadelphia, Pennsylvania

Head coach

- Fang Mitchell

Assistant coach(es)

Legend

- (C) Team captain
- (S) Suspended
- (I) Ineligible
- (W) Walk-on
- Injured
- Current redshirt

== Schedule ==
Date time, TV	Rank^{#}	Opponent^{#}	Result	Record	Site (attendance) city, state
Regular season
Nov 25, 1989*		at Maine	L 64–69	0–1	Alfond Arena; Orono, Maine
Nov 27, 1989*		at Creighton	W 66–60	1–1	Omaha Civic Auditorium; Omaha, Nebraska
Dec 1, 1989*		vs. Morehead State	W 79–70	2–1	Irving Gymnasium; Muncie, Indiana
Dec 2, 1989*		at Ball State	L 66–71	2–2	Irving Gymnasium; Muncie, Indiana
Dec 4, 1989*		at Toledo	W 77–73	3–2	John F. Savage Hall; Toledo, Ohio
Dec 12, 1989*		at Maryland	W 70–63	4–2	Cole Fieldhouse; College Park, Maryland
Dec 14, 1989*		at Maryland-Baltimore County	L 73–79	4–3	RAC Arena; Catonsville, Maryland
Dec 23, 1989*		vs. Cornell	W 86–79	5–3	
Dec 24, 1989*		vs. George Mason	L 59–74	5–4	
MEAC tournament
Mar 1, 1990*		vs. Morgan State; MEAC Tournament Quarterfinal	W 90–67	24–6	Greensboro Coliseum; Greensboro, North Carolina
Mar 2, 1990*		vs. South Carolina State; MEAC Tournament Semifinal	W 48–37	25–6	Greensboro Coliseum; Greensboro, North Carolina
Mar 3, 1990*		at North Carolina A&T; MEAC tournament championship	W 54–50	26–6	Greensboro Coliseum; Greensboro, North Carolina
NCAA tournament
Mar 16, 1990*	(15 SE)	vs. (2 SE) No. 6 Syracuse; First Round	L 48–70	26–7	Richmond Coliseum; Richmond, Virginia
*Non-conference game. ^{#}Rankings from AP Poll. (#) Tournament seedings in parentheses. SE=Southeast. All times are in Eastern Time.
