= 1997 Big 12 men's basketball tournament =

- Classification: Division I
- Season: 1996–97
- Teams: 12
- Site: Kemper Arena; Kansas City, Missouri
- Champions: Kansas (1st title)
- Winning coach: Roy Williams (1st title)
- MVP: Paul Pierce (Kansas)
- Attendance: 114,420 (overall); 19,310 (championship)
- Top scorer: Corey Brewer (Oklahoma) (73 points)
- Television: CBS

1996–97 Big 12 men's basketball standings
	Conf.				Overall
Team	W		L	PCT	W		L	PCT
No. 1 Kansas †	15	–	1	.938	34	–	2	.944
No. 24 Colorado	11	–	5	.688	22	–	10	.688
Texas	10	–	6	.625	18	–	12	.600
No. 18 Iowa State	10	–	6	.625	22	–	9	.710
Texas Tech	10	–	6	.625	19	–	9	.679
Oklahoma	9	–	7	.563	19	–	11	.633
Nebraska	7	–	9	.438	18	–	15	.545
Oklahoma State	7	–	9	.438	17	–	15	.531
Baylor	6	–	10	.375	18	–	12	.600
Missouri	5	–	11	.313	16	–	17	.485
Texas A&M	3	–	13	.188	9	–	18	.333
Kansas State	3	–	13	.188	10	–	17	.370
† 1997 Big 12 Tournament winner Rankings from AP poll

The 1997 Big 12 men's basketball tournament was the postseason men's basketball tournament for the Big 12 Conference. It was played from March 6 to 9 in Kansas City, Missouri at Kemper Arena. Kansas won the tournament for the 1st time and received the conference's automatic bid to the 1997 NCAA tournament.

== Seeding ==
The tournament consisted of a 12 team single-elimination tournament with the top 4 seeds receiving a bye.

1997 Big 12 Men's Basketball Tournament seeds
Seed	School	Conf.	Over.	Tiebreaker
1	Kansas ‡#	15–1	34–2	
2	Texas #	10–6	18–12	
3	Colorado #	11–5	22–10	
4	Iowa State #	10–6	22–9	1–0 vs. Texas Tech
5	Texas Tech	10–6	19–9	0–1 vs. Iowa State
6	Oklahoma	9–7	19–11	
7	Nebraska	7–9	18–15	1–0 vs. Oklahoma State
8	Oklahoma State	7–9	17–15	0–1 vs. Nebraska
9	Baylor	6–10	18–12	
10	Missouri	5–11	16–17	
11	Texas A&M	3–13	9–18	1–0 vs. Kansas State
12	Kansas State	3–13	10–17	0–1 vs. Texas A&M
‡ – Big 12 Conference regular season champions, and tournament No. 1 seed. # – Received a single-bye in the conference tournament. Overall records include all games played in the Big 12 Conference tournament.

== Schedule ==
Session	Game	Time	Matchup	Television	Attendance
First Round – Thursday, March 6
1	1	12:00 PM	#8 Oklahoma State 80 vs #9 Baylor 66	Creative Sports	19,100
1	2	2:20 PM	#5 Texas Tech 73 vs #12 Kansas State 57	Creative Sports	19,100
2	3	6:00 PM	#10 Missouri 78 vs #7 Nebraska 72	Creative Sports	18,800
2	4	8:20 PM	#6 Oklahoma 67 vs #11 Texas A&M 58	Creative Sports	18,800
Quarterfinals – Friday, March 7
3	5	12:00 PM	#1 Kansas 74 vs #8 Oklahoma State 59	Creative Sports	18,800
3	6	2:20 PM	#4 Iowa State 72 vs #5 Texas Tech 70	Creative Sports	18,800
4	7	6:00 PM	#10 Missouri 80 vs #2 Texas 75	Creative Sports	19,100
4	8	8:20 PM	#6 Oklahoma 55 vs #3 Colorado 41	Creative Sports	19,100
Semifinals – Saturday, March 8
5	9	1:00 PM	#1 Kansas 72 vs #4 Iowa State 48	Creative Sports	19,310
5	10	3:20 PM	#10 Missouri 89 vs #6 Oklahoma 80	Creative Sports	19,310
Final – Sunday, March 9
6	11	12:00 PM	#1 Kansas 87 vs #10 Missouri 60	CBS	19,310
Game times in CT. #-Rankings denote tournament seed

== Bracket ==
First round Thursday, March 6
8	Oklahoma State	80
9	Baylor	66
5	Texas Tech	73
12	Kansas State	57
10	Missouri	78
7	Nebraska	72
6	Oklahoma	67
11	Texas A&M	58

Quarterfinals; Friday, March 7
1	No. 1 Kansas	74
8	Oklahoma St.	59
4	No. 16 Iowa St	72
5	Texas Tech	70
10	Missouri	80
2	Texas	75
6	Oklahoma	55
3	No. 18 Colorado	41

Semifinals; Saturday, March 8
1	No. 1 Kansas	72
4	No. 16 Iowa State	48
10	Missouri	89
6	Oklahoma	80

Championship; Sunday, March 9
1	No. 1 Kansas	87
10	Missouri	60

== All-Tournament Team ==
Most Outstanding Player – Paul Pierce, Kansas

Player	Team	Position	Class
Paul Pierce	Kansas	So.	F
Raef LaFrentz	Kansas	Jr.	F
Jacque Vaughn	Kansas	Sr.	G
Jason Sutherland	Missouri	Sr.	G
Corey Brewer	Oklahoma	Jr.	G

== See also ==
- 1997 Big 12 Conference women's basketball tournament
- 1997 NCAA Division I men's basketball tournament
- 1996–97 NCAA Division I men's basketball rankings
