= 2008 MEAC men's basketball tournament =

- Classification: Division I
- Season: 2007–08
- Teams: 11
- Site: RBC Center; Raleigh, North Carolina
- Champions: Coppin State (4th title)
- Winning coach: Ron Mitchell (4th title)
- MVP: Tywain McKee (Coppin State)
- Television: ESPN Classic

2007–08 MEAC men's basketball standings
	Conf.				Overall
Team	W		L	PCT	W		L	PCT
Morgan State	14	–	2	.875	22	–	11	.667
Hampton	11	–	5	.688	18	–	12	.600
Norfolk State	11	–	5	.688	16	–	15	.516
Delaware State	10	–	6	.625	14	–	16	.467
North Carolina A&T	9	–	7	.563	15	–	16	.484
Florida A&M	9	–	7	.563	15	–	17	.469
Coppin State †	7	–	9	.438	16	–	21	.432
South Carolina State	7	–	9	.438	13	–	20	.394
Bethune–Cookman	5	–	11	.313	11	–	21	.344
Howard	3	–	13	.188	6	–	26	.188
Maryland Eastern Shore	2	–	14	.125	4	–	28	.125
Winston-Salem State		–		–	12	–	18	.400
† 2008 MEAC tournament winner Rankings from AP Poll

The 2008 Mid-Eastern Athletic Conference men's basketball tournament took place on March 11–15, 2008 at the RBC Center in Raleigh, North Carolina. The championship game was televised by ESPN Classic.

== Bracket ==
First round Tuesday-Wednesday, March 11–12
10	Howard	74^{OT}
7	Coppin State	75
6	Florida A&M	70
11	Maryland Eastern Shore	61
8	South Carolina State	78
9	Bethune–Cookman	69

Quarterfinals; Wednesday-Thursday, March 12–13
7	Coppin State	75
2	Hampton	74^{OT}
6	Florida A&M	61
3	Norfolk State	69
5	North Carolina A&T	62
4	Delaware State	64
8	South Carolina State	68
1	Morgan State	77

Semifinals; Friday, March 14
7	Coppin State	67
3	Norfolk State	65
4	Delaware State	55
1	Morgan State	61

Final; Saturday, March 15
7	Coppin State	62
1	Morgan State	60
