= 1996–97 Iowa State Cyclones men's basketball team =

American college basketball season

1996–97 Iowa State Cyclones men's basketball
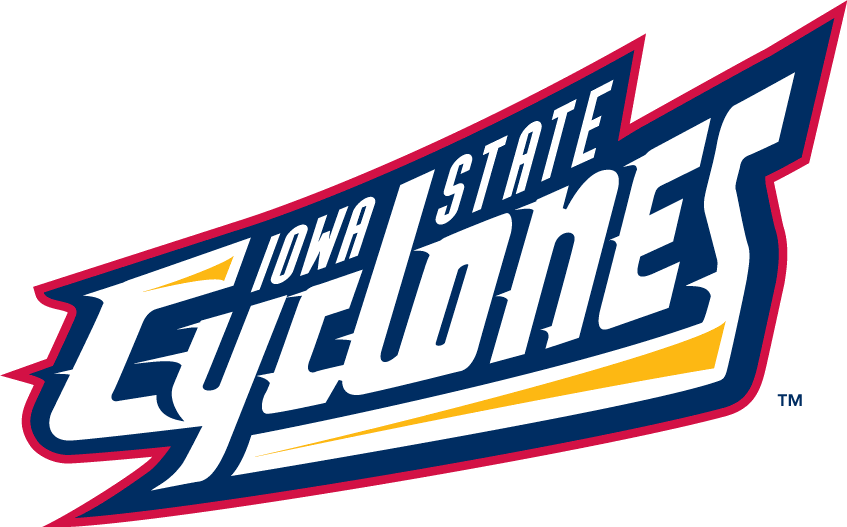

1997 NCAA tournament, Sweet Sixteen
- Conference: Big 12 Conference

Ranking
- Coaches: No. 13
- AP: No. 18
- Record: 22–9 (10–6 Big 12)
- Head coach: Tim Floyd (3rd season)
- Assistant coach: Steve Krafcisin
- Home arena: Hilton Coliseum

1996–97 Big 12 men's basketball standings
	Conf.				Overall
Team	W		L	PCT	W		L	PCT
No. 1 Kansas †	15	–	1	.938	34	–	2	.944
No. 24 Colorado	11	–	5	.688	22	–	10	.688
Texas	10	–	6	.625	18	–	12	.600
No. 18 Iowa State	10	–	6	.625	22	–	9	.710
Texas Tech	10	–	6	.625	19	–	9	.679
Oklahoma	9	–	7	.563	19	–	11	.633
Nebraska	7	–	9	.438	18	–	15	.545
Oklahoma State	7	–	9	.438	17	–	15	.531
Baylor	6	–	10	.375	18	–	12	.600
Missouri	5	–	11	.313	16	–	17	.485
Texas A&M	3	–	13	.188	9	–	18	.333
Kansas State	3	–	13	.188	10	–	17	.370
† 1997 Big 12 Tournament winner Rankings from AP poll

The 1996–97 Iowa State Cyclones men's basketball team represented Iowa State University during the 1996–97 NCAA Division I men's basketball season. The Cyclones were coached by Tim Floyd, who was in his third season. They played their home games at Hilton Coliseum in Ames, Iowa, and were an original member of the newly created Big 12 Conference. The Big 12 conference was formed by the eight teams of the recently dissolved Big Eight Conference, and was joined by Baylor, Texas, Texas A&M, and Texas Tech, all formerly of the Southwest Conference, which had also dissolved following the 1995–1996 school year.

The Cyclones finished the season 22–9 and 10–6 in conference play to finish in a tie for third place. They defeated Texas Tech and lost to Kansas in the semifinals of the Big 12 Conference tournament. They received an at-large bid to the NCAA tournament, where they defeated Illinois State and Cincinnati to reach the Sweet Sixteen, where they lost to UCLA in overtime.

== Previous season ==
In the previous season, the Cyclones finished the season 24–9, 9–5 in Big Eight play to finish in 2nd place. They defeated Nebraska, Missouri, and #5 Kansas to win the 1996 Big Eight conference tournament championship. This was Iowa State's first conference championship in program history. The conference championship earned them a bid to the NCAA tournament and a #5 seed. In the tournament, they defeated Cal and lost to Utah in the round of 32.

This was the Cyclones' final season in the Big Eight Conference, which dissolved at the end of the 1995–1996 school year.

The Cyclones saw individual success with Dedric Willoughby being named All-American honorable mention, first team All-Big Eight, and Big Eight tournament MVP. Tim Floyd was named Big Eight Coach of the Year, and was runner up for AP Coach of the Year.

== Preseason ==
=== Preseason poll ===
Preseason poll
Finish	School
1	Kansas
2	Texas
3	Iowa State
4	Oklahoma State
5	Missouri
6	Texas Tech
7	Oklahoma
8	Nebraska
9	Kansas State
10	Texas A&M
11	Colorado
12	Baylor

=== Incoming players ===
Incoming players
Name	Position	Height	Weight	Previous school	Hometown
Brad Johnson	Guard	6'5"	200 lbs.	Indian Hills CC	Geneseo, Illinois
Jason Teeter	Guard	6'5"	180 lbs.	Algona High	Algona, Iowa
Paul Shirley	Forward	6'9"	230 lbs.	Jefferson West	Meriden, Kansas
Russ Schoenauer	Forward	6'9"	235 lbs.	Waukee	Waukee, Iowa
DeAndre Harris	Guard	6'0"	190 lbs.	Marshalltown CC	Milwaukee

== Roster ==
1996–97 Iowa State Cyclones men's basketball team
Players
Coaches

Pos.	#	Name	Height	Weight	Year	Previous school	Hometown
G	3	Matt Knoll	5 ft 11 in (1.8 m)	160 lb (73 kg)	Jr	East Marshall	Gilman, Iowa
G	4	Brad Johnson	6 ft 5 in (1.96 m)	200 lb (91 kg)	Jr	Indian Hills CC	Geneseo, Illinois
G	10	Jacy Holloway	6 ft 0 in (1.83 m)	160 lb (73 kg)	Sr	Moundridge High	McPherson, Kansas
G	11	DeAndre Harris	6 ft 0 in (1.83 m)	190 lb (86 kg)	Jr	Marshalltown CC	Milwaukee
C	13	Kelvin Cato	6 ft 9 in (2.06 m)	255 lb (116 kg)	Sr	South Alabama	Lithonia, GA
G	22	Dedric Willoughby	6 ft 3 in (1.91 m)	190 lb (86 kg)	RS Sr	New Orleans	New Orleans
F	23	Stevie Johnson	6 ft 4 in (1.93 m)	225 lb (102 kg)	Fr	Perry Central	Beaumont, Mississippi
F	31	Shawn Bankhead	6 ft 6 in (1.98 m)	225 lb (102 kg)	Sr	Southern Idaho CC	Pacoima, California
G	32	Ha-Keem Abdel-Khaliq (W)	6 ft 4 in (1.93 m)	195 lb (88 kg)	Sr	Kansas City, Kansas
G	33	Jason Teeter	6 ft 5 in (1.96 m)	180 lb (82 kg)	Fr	Algona High	Algona, Iowa
F	40	Klay Edwards	6 ft 9 in (2.06 m)	225 lb (102 kg)	RS So	Winfield-Mt. Union	Morning Sun, Iowa
F	42	Kenny Pratt	6 ft 5 in (1.96 m)	230 lb (104 kg)	Sr	Eastern Utah JC	Chicago
F	45	Paul Shirley (W)	6 ft 9 in (2.06 m)	230 lb (104 kg)	Fr	Jefferson West	Meriden, Kansas
F	52	Russ Schoenauer	6 ft 9 in (2.06 m)	235 lb (107 kg)	Fr	Waukee	Waukee, Iowa
C	55	Tony Rampton	7 ft 0 in (2.13 m)	230 lb (104 kg)	So	Waseca	New Plymouth, NZ

Head coach

- Tim Floyd (Louisiana Tech)

Assistant coach(es)

- Steve Krafcisin (Iowa)

Legend

- (C) Team captain
- (S) Suspended
- (I) Ineligible
- (W) Walk-on
- Injured
- Current redshirt

== Schedule and results ==
Date time, TV	Rank^{#}	Opponent^{#}	Result	Record	Site city, state
Exhibition
November 13, 1996; 7:00 pm		World Basketball Opportunities (Wisconsin); Exhibition	W 91-84		Hilton Coliseum; Ames, Iowa
November 19, 1996*; 7:00 pm		Adelaide 36ers (Australia); Exhibition	L 66-86		Hilton Coliseum; Ames, Iowa
Regular season
November 26, 1996*; 7:00 pm	No. 9	Alcorn State	W 87–58	1–0	Hilton Coliseum (7,025); Ames, Iowa
December 1, 1996*; 1:00 pm, Cyclone Television Network	No. 9	Maryland-Eastern Shore	W 82–62	2–0	Hilton Coliseum (8,920); Ames, Iowa
December 5, 1996*; 8:00 pm, Cyclone Television Network	No. 9	Tennessee-Martin; Cyclone Challenge	W 57–36	3–0	Hilton Coliseum (11,722); Ames, Iowa
December 6, 1996*; 8:00 pm, Cyclone Television Network	No. 9	Siena; Cyclone Challenge	W 64–54	4–0	Hilton Coliseum (12,601); Ames, Iowa
December 11, 1996*; 7:00 pm, Cyclone Television Network	No. 6	Drake; Iowa Big Four	W 74–50	5–0	Hilton Coliseum (12,950); Ames, Iowa
December 14, 1996*; 7:05 pm, HTN	No. 6	Iowa; Rivalry	W 81–74	6–0	Carver–Hawkeye Arena (15,500); Iowa City, Iowa
December 21, 1996*; 8:00 pm, Cyclone Television Network	No. 5	East Tennessee State; ISU Holiday Classic	W 77–49	7–0	Hilton Coliseum (12,135); Ames, Iowa
December 22, 1996*; 8:00 pm, Cyclone Television Network	No. 5	UTEP; ISU Holiday Classic	W 59–48	8–0	Hilton Coliseum (12,115); Ames, Iowa
December 30, 1996*; 8:00 pm, Cyclone Television Network	No. 5	Texas-Pan American	W 66–42	9–0	Hilton Coliseum (12,105); Ames, Iowa
January 4, 1997; 3:00 pm, Creative Sports	No. 4	Missouri	W 68–65	10–0 (1–0)	Hearnes Center (13,300); Columbia, Missouri
January 7, 1997*; 7:00 pm, Cyclone Television Network	No. 4	Marquette	L 64–67	10–1	Hilton Coliseum (11,210); Ames, Iowa
January 11, 1997; 12:45 pm, Creative Sports	No. 4	Oklahoma	W 82–55	11–1 (2–0)	Hilton Coliseum (13,755); Ames, Iowa
January 13, 1997; 8:30 pm, ESPN	No. 4	at No. 1 Kansas	L 67–80	11–2 (2–1)	Allen Fieldhouse (16,300); Lawrence, Kansas
January 18, 1997; 12:45 pm, Creative Sports	No. 8	at Colorado	L 45–70	11–3 (2–2)	Coors Events Center (8,278); Boulder, Colorado
January 22, 1997; 7:00 pm, Cyclone Television Network	No. 14	Kansas State	W 54–48	12–3 (3–2)	Hilton Coliseum (12,098); Ames, Iowa
January 25, 1997; 3:00 pm, Creative Sports	No. 14	No. 20 Texas Tech	W 64–61	13–3 (4–2)	Hilton Coliseum (14,021); Ames, Iowa
January 29, 1997; 7:05 pm	No. 11	at Nebraska	W 77–67	14–3 (5–2)	Bob Devaney Center (13,623); Lincoln, Nebraska
February 1, 1997; 7:00 pm, Cyclone Television Network	No. 11	at Texas A&M	W 71–57	15–3 (6–2)	Reed Arena (5,501); College Station, Texas
February 5, 1997; 7:00 pm, Cyclone Television Network	No. 6	Baylor	W 61–52	16–3 (7–2)	Hilton Coliseum (10,706); Ames, Iowa
February 9, 1997; 2:00 pm, CBS	No. 6	No. 1 Kansas	L 62–69	16–4 (7–3)	Hilton Coliseum (14,325); Ames, Iowa
February 12, 1997; 7:00 pm	No. 9	Missouri	W 87–59	17–4 (8–3)	Hilton Coliseum (13,866); Ames, Iowa
February 15, 1997; 12:45 pm, Creative Sports	No. 9	at Kansas State	W 62–58	18–4 (9–3)	Bramlage Coliseum (10,763); Manhattan, Kansas
February 19, 1997; 8:00 pm, Creative Sports	No. 7	at Texas	L 56–57	18–5 (9–4)	Frank Erwin Center (16,175); Austin, Texas
February 22, 1997; 12:45 pm, Creative Sports	No. 7	Nebraska	L 69–74 ^{OT}	18–6 (9–5)	Hilton Coliseum (14,322); Ames, Iowa
February 26, 1997; 7:00 pm, Cyclone Television Network	No. 13	No. 19 Colorado	W 65–54	19–6 (10–5)	Hilton Coliseum (14,020); Ames, Iowa
March 1, 1997; 8:30 pm, ESPN	No. 13	at Oklahoma State	L 63-67	19–7 (10–6)	Gallagher-Iba Arena (5,915); Stillwater, Oklahoma
Big 12 Tournament
March 7, 1997; 2:20 pm, Creative Sports	No. 16	vs. Texas Tech; Quarterfinals	W 72–70	20–7	Kemper Arena (18,800); Kansas City, Missouri
March 8, 1997; 1:00 pm, Creative Sports	No. 16	vs. No. 1 Kansas; Semifinals	L 48–72	20–8	Kemper Arena (19,310); Kansas City, Missouri
NCAA Tournament
March 13, 1997; 1:45 pm, CBS	(#6 W) No. 18	vs. (#11 W) Illinois State; First round	W 69–57	21–8	The Palace of Auburn Hills (21,020); Auburn Hills, Michigan
March 15, 1997; 3:40 pm, CBS	(#6 W) No. 18	vs. (#3 W) No. 10 Cincinnati; Second round	W 67–66	22–8	The Palace of Auburn Hills (21,020); Auburn Hills, Michigan
March 20, 1997; 9:25 pm, CBS	(#6 W) No. 18	vs. (#2 W) No. 7 UCLA; Sweet Sixteen	L 73–74 ^{OT}	22–9	Alamodome (29,231); San Antonio, Texas
*Non-conference game. ^{#}Rankings from AP poll. (#) Tournament seedings in parentheses. W=West. All times are in Central Time.

== Rankings ==
During weeks eight and nine of the regular season, the Cyclones were ranked #4 in the AP poll. This was the highest ranking they had reached since the 1956–57 season, when they were ranked #3. This was also the first time in school history that the Cyclones were ranked in the top 25 of both the AP and Coaches Poll in every week of the season.

Ranking movements Legend: ██ Increase in ranking ██ Decrease in ranking
	Week																				
Poll	Pre	1	2	3	4	5	6	7	8	9	10	11	12	13	14	15	16	17	18	19	Final
AP poll	11	11	11	11	9	9	6	5	5	4	4	8	14	11	6	9	7	13	16	18	Not released
Coaches Poll	11	11	11	11	15	15	12	5	5	4	4	5	12	12	13	9	8	12	15	17	13

== Awards and honors ==
- All-Americans

Dedric Willoughby (2nd team)

- NCAA Tournament All-Regional Team

Dedric Willoughby

- Ralph A. Olsen Award

Dedric Willoughby

- All-Big 12 Selections

Dedric Willoughby (First team)
Kelvin Cato (Third team)
Kenny Pratt (Third team)

- Academic All-Big 12

Ha-Keem Abdel-Khaliq (First team)
Klay Edwards (First team)
Jason Teeter (First team)
Paul Shirley (Second team)
Tony Rampton (Second team)
Stevie Johnson (Second team)
Matthew Knoll (Second team)
