= 1990 MEAC men's basketball tournament =

- Classification: Division I
- Season: 1989–90
- Teams: 8
- Site: Campus sites
- Finals site: Greensboro Coliseum; Greensboro, North Carolina
- Champions: Coppin State (1st title)
- Winning coach: Fang Mitchell (1st title)
- MVP: Reggie Isaac (Coppin State)

1989–90 MEAC men's basketball standings
	Conf.				Overall
Team	W		L	PCT	W		L	PCT
Coppin State †	15	–	1	.938	26	–	7	.788
Florida A&M	13	–	3	.813	18	–	11	.621
Delaware State	9	–	7	.563	14	–	14	.500
South Carolina State	8	–	8	.500	13	–	16	.448
Bethune–Cookman	8	–	8	.500	10	–	18	.357
North Carolina A&T	6	–	10	.375	12	–	17	.414
Howard	5	–	11	.313	8	–	19	.296
Maryland Eastern Shore	4	–	12	.250	10	–	17	.370
Morgan State	4	–	12	.250	8	–	20	.286
† 1990 MEAC tournament winner Rankings from AP Poll

The 1990 Mid-Eastern Athletic Conference men's basketball tournament took place on March 1–3, 1990, at Greensboro Coliseum in Greensboro, North Carolina. Coppin State defeated North Carolina A&T, 54–50 in the championship game, to win its first MEAC Tournament title.

The Eagles earned an automatic bid to the 1990 NCAA tournament as #15 seed in the Southeast region.

== Format ==
Eight of nine conference members participated, with play beginning in the quarterfinal round. Teams were seeded based on their regular season conference record.

== Bracket ==
Quarterfinals; March 1
1	Coppin State	90
8	Morgan State	67
4	South Carolina State	78
5	Bethune-Cookman	71
3	Delaware State	77
6	North Carolina A&T	96
2	Florida A&M	69
7	Howard	53

Semifinals; March 2
1	Coppin State	48
4	South Carolina State	37
6	North Carolina A&T	65
2	Florida A&M	64

Final; March 3
1	Coppin State	54
6	North Carolina A&T	50

* denotes overtime period
