= 1996–97 Oklahoma Sooners men's basketball team =

American college basketball season

1996–97 Oklahoma Sooners men's basketball

NCAA tournament, First round
- Conference: Big 12 Conference
- Record: 19–11 (9–7 Big 12)
- Head coach: Kelvin Sampson (3rd season)
- Home arena: Lloyd Noble Center (Capacity: 10,871)

1996–97 Big 12 men's basketball standings
| | Conf. | | | | Overall |
| Team | W | | L | PCT | W | | L | PCT |
|---|---|---|---|---|---|---|---|---|
| No. 1 Kansas † | 15 | – | 1 | .938 | 34 | – | 2 | .944 |
| No. 24 Colorado | 11 | – | 5 | .688 | 22 | – | 10 | .688 |
| Texas | 10 | – | 6 | .625 | 18 | – | 12 | .600 |
| No. 18 Iowa State | 10 | – | 6 | .625 | 22 | – | 9 | .710 |
| Texas Tech | 10 | – | 6 | .625 | 19 | – | 9 | .679 |
| Oklahoma | 9 | – | 7 | .563 | 19 | – | 11 | .633 |
| Nebraska | 7 | – | 9 | .438 | 18 | – | 15 | .545 |
| Oklahoma State | 7 | – | 9 | .438 | 17 | – | 15 | .531 |
| Baylor | 6 | – | 10 | .375 | 18 | – | 12 | .600 |
| Missouri | 5 | – | 11 | .313 | 16 | – | 17 | .485 |
| Texas A&M | 3 | – | 13 | .188 | 9 | – | 18 | .333 |
| Kansas State | 3 | – | 13 | .188 | 10 | – | 17 | .370 |
† 1997 Big 12 Tournament winner Rankings from AP poll

The 1996–97 Oklahoma Sooners men's basketball team represented the University of Oklahoma in competitive college basketball during the 1996–97 NCAA Division I men's basketball season. The Oklahoma Sooners men's basketball team played its home games in the Lloyd Noble Center and was a member of the National Collegiate Athletic Association's Big 12 Conference.

The team posted a 19–11 overall record (9–7 Big 12). The Sooners received a bid to the 1997 NCAA tournament as No. 11 seed in the West region. The Sooners lost to No. 6 seed Stanford, 80–67, in the opening round.

== Roster ==
1996–97 Oklahoma Sooners men's basketball team
Players
Coaches

| Pos. | # | Name | Height | Weight | Year | Hometown |
|---|---|---|---|---|---|---|
| G | 21 | Eduardo Nájera | 6 ft 8 in (2.03 m) | 235 lb (107 kg) | Fr |
| G | 31 | Corey Brewer | 6 ft 2 in (1.88 m) | 185 lb (84 kg) | Jr | West Memphis, Arkansas |
| C | 32 | Evan Wiley | 6 ft 11 in (2.11 m) | — | Jr |

Head coach

- Kelvin Sampson

Assistant coach(es)

Legend

- (C) Team captain
- (S) Suspended
- (I) Ineligible
- (W) Walk-on
- Injured
- Current redshirt

Roster

== Schedule and results ==
| Date time, TV | Rank^{#} | Opponent^{#} | Result | Record | Site (attendance) city, state |
Non-conference regular season
| November 23, 1996* | | Northeast Louisiana | W 95–68 | 1–0 | Lloyd Noble Center; Norman, Oklahoma |
| November 27, 1996* | | Sam Houston State | W 84–51 | 2–0 | Lloyd Noble Center; Norman, Oklahoma |
| November 30, 1996* | | Coppin State | W 88–64 | 3–0 | Lloyd Noble Center; Norman, Oklahoma |
| December 4, 1996* | | Delaware State | W 83–56 | 4–0 | Lloyd Noble Center; Norman, Oklahoma |
| December 7, 1996* | | Southeast Missouri State | W 83–52 | 5–0 | Lloyd Noble Center; Norman, Oklahoma |
| December 14, 1996* | | Centenary | W 89–45 | 6–0 | Lloyd Noble Center; Norman, Oklahoma |
| December 21, 1996* | | Purdue | W 82–58 | 7–0 | Lloyd Noble Center; Norman, Oklahoma |
| December 23, 1996* | | at Memphis | L 47–61 | 7–1 | The Pyramid; Memphis, Tennessee |
| December 27, 1996* | | vs. Western Illinois; All-College Basketball Classic | W 74–62 | 8–1 | Myriad Convention Center; Oklahoma City, Oklahoma |
| December 28, 1996* | | vs. Tulsa; All-College Basketball Classic | L 75–78 | 8–2 | Myriad Convention Center; Oklahoma City, Oklahoma |
Big 12 Regular Season
| January 5, 1997 | | at Texas A&M | W 78–59 | 9–2 (1–0) | G. Rollie White Coliseum; College Station, Texas |
| January 11, 1997 | | at No. 4 Iowa State | L 55–82 | 9–3 (1–1) | Hilton Coliseum; Ames, Iowa |
| January 15, 1997 | | No. 25 Texas Tech | L 62–67 | 9–4 (1–2) | Lloyd Noble Center; Norman, Oklahoma |
| January 18, 1997 | | Baylor | W 84–67 | 10–4 (2–2) | Lloyd Noble Center; Norman, Oklahoma |
| January 22, 1997 | | at No. 23 Texas | L 66–76 | 10–5 (2–3) | Frank Erwin Center; Austin, Texas |
| January 25, 1997 | | Nebraska | W 84–77 | 11–5 (3–3) | Lloyd Noble Center; Norman, Oklahoma |
| January 27, 1997 | | at Oklahoma State; Bedlam Series | L 72–73 ^{OT} | 11–6 (3–4) | Gallagher-Iba Arena; Stillwater, Oklahoma |
| February 1, 1997 | | No. 23 Texas | W 83–69 | 12–6 (4–4) | Lloyd Noble Center; Norman, Oklahoma |
| February 4, 1997 | | Texas A&M | W 62–59 ^{OT} | 13–6 (5–4) | Lloyd Noble Center; Norman, Oklahoma |
| February 8, 1997 | | at Kansas State | L 63–67 | 13–7 (5–5) | Bramlage Coliseum; Manhattan, Kansas |
| February 12, 1997 | | No. 15 Colorado | W 91–66 | 14–7 (6–5) | Lloyd Noble Center; Norman, Oklahoma |
| February 15, 1997 | | at Missouri | L 73–80 | 14–8 (6–6) | Hearnes Center; Columbia, Missouri |
| February 19, 1997 | | at Texas Tech | W 66–60 | 15–8 (7–6) | Lubbock Municipal Coliseum; Lubbock, Texas |
| February 22, 1997 | | Oklahoma State; Bedlam Series | W 80–64 | 16–8 (8–6) | Lloyd Noble Center; Norman, Oklahoma |
| February 24, 1997* | | No. 1 Kansas | L 68–70 | 16–9 (8–7) | Lloyd Noble Center; Norman, Oklahoma |
| March 1, 1997 | | at Baylor | W 72–61 | 17–9 (9–7) | Ferrell Center; Waco, Texas |
Big 12 Tournament
| March 6, 1997* | | vs. Texas A&M; First round | W 67–58 | 18–9 | Kemper Arena; Kansas City, Missouri |
| March 7, 1997* | | vs. No. 18 Colorado; Quarterfinals | W 55–41 | 19–9 | Kemper Arena; Kansas City, Missouri |
| March 8, 1997* | | vs. Missouri; Semifinals | L 80–89 | 19–10 | Kemper Arena; Kansas City, Missouri |
NCAA Tournament
| March 14, 1997* | (11 W) | vs. (6 W) No. 21 Stanford; First round | L 67–80 | 19–11 | McKale Center; Tucson, Arizona |
*Non-conference game. ^{#}Rankings from AP Poll. (#) Tournament seedings in parentheses. All times are in Central Time. (#) during NCAA Tournament is seed within region W=West.
