= 1996–97 Kansas Jayhawks men's basketball team =

American college basketball season

1996–97 Kansas Jayhawks men's basketball
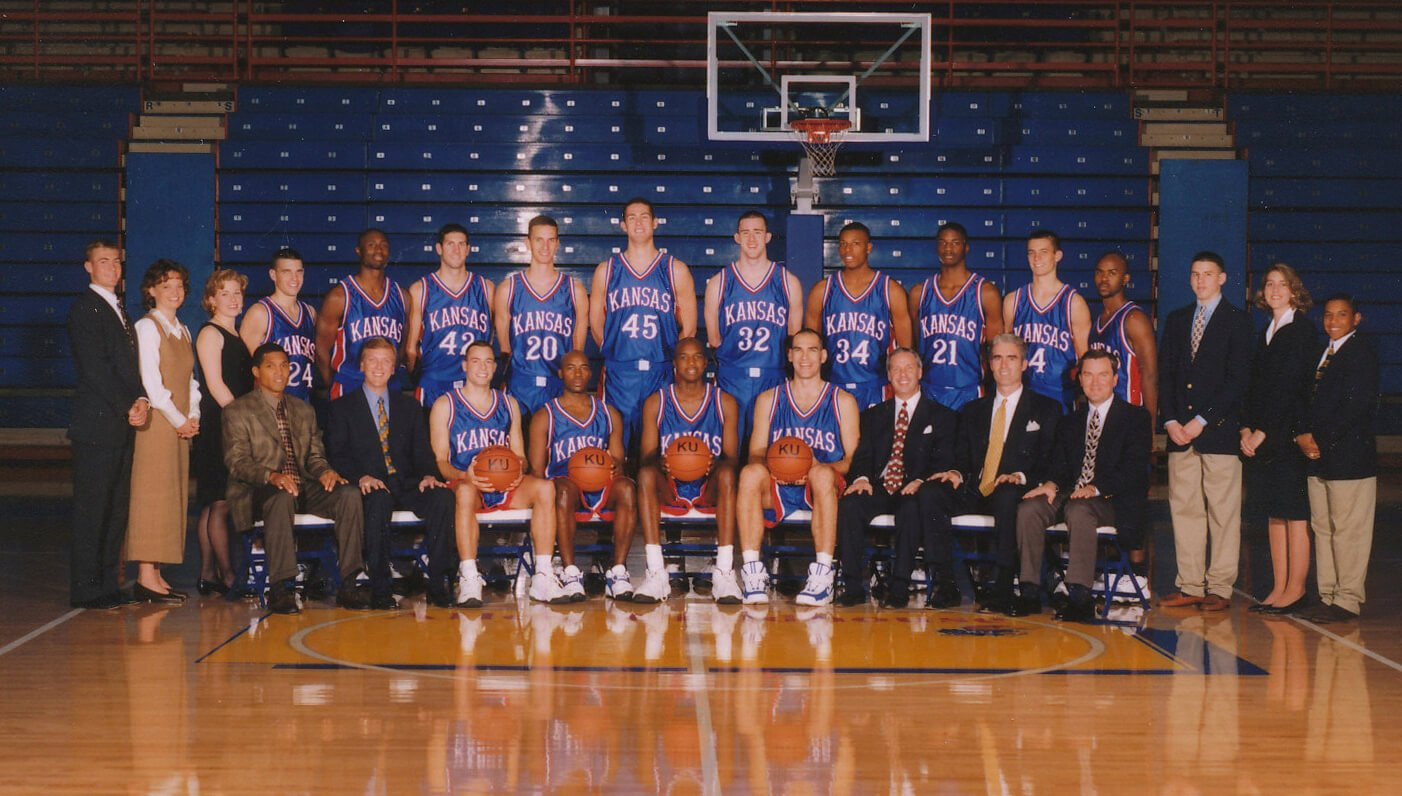

NCAA Division I regular season champions Maui Invitational Tournament champions Big 12 regular season champions Big 12 tournament champions

NCAA men's Division I tournament, Sweet Sixteen
- Conference: Big 12 Conference
- North

Ranking
- Coaches: No. 5
- AP: No. 1
- Record: 34–2 (15–1 Big 12)
- Head coach: Roy Williams (9th season)
- Assistant coaches: Matt Doherty (5th season); Neil Dougherty (2nd season); Joe Holladay (3rd season)
- Captains: Jerod Haase; Scot Pollard; Jacque Vaughn; B.J. Williams
- Home arena: Allen Fieldhouse

1996–97 Big 12 men's basketball standings
| | Conf. | | | | Overall |
| Team | W | | L | PCT | W | | L | PCT |
|---|---|---|---|---|---|---|---|---|
| No. 1 Kansas † | 15 | – | 1 | .938 | 34 | – | 2 | .944 |
| No. 24 Colorado | 11 | – | 5 | .688 | 22 | – | 10 | .688 |
| Texas | 10 | – | 6 | .625 | 18 | – | 12 | .600 |
| No. 18 Iowa State | 10 | – | 6 | .625 | 22 | – | 9 | .710 |
| Texas Tech | 10 | – | 6 | .625 | 19 | – | 9 | .679 |
| Oklahoma | 9 | – | 7 | .563 | 19 | – | 11 | .633 |
| Nebraska | 7 | – | 9 | .438 | 18 | – | 15 | .545 |
| Oklahoma State | 7 | – | 9 | .438 | 17 | – | 15 | .531 |
| Baylor | 6 | – | 10 | .375 | 18 | – | 12 | .600 |
| Missouri | 5 | – | 11 | .313 | 16 | – | 17 | .485 |
| Texas A&M | 3 | – | 13 | .188 | 9 | – | 18 | .333 |
| Kansas State | 3 | – | 13 | .188 | 10 | – | 17 | .370 |
† 1997 Big 12 Tournament winner Rankings from AP poll

The 1996–97 Kansas Jayhawks men's basketball team represented the University of Kansas in the 1996–97 NCAA Division I men's basketball season, which was the Jayhawks' 99th basketball season. The head coach was Roy Williams, who served his 9th year at KU. The team played its home games in Allen Fieldhouse in Lawrence, Kansas. It was the Jayhawks first year in the newly formed Big 12 Conference. The Big 12 conference was formed by the eight teams of the recently dissolved Big Eight Conference and was joined by Baylor, Texas, Texas A&M, and Texas Tech, all formally of the Southwest Conference which had dissolved following the 1995–1996 school year as well.

== Roster ==
| Name | # | Position | Height | Weight | Year | Home Town |
|---|---|---|---|---|---|---|
| Nick Bradford | 21 | Forward/Guard | 6-6 | 175 | Freshman | Fayetteville, Arkansas |
| Joel Branstrom | 20 | Forward | 6-6 | 197 | Senior | Half Moon Bay, California |
| Jerod Haase | 35 | Guard | 6-3 | 191 | Senior | South Lake Tahoe, California |
| Raef LaFrentz | 45 | Forward/Center | 6–11 | 235 | Junior | Hampton, Iowa |
| C.B. McGrath | 24 | Guard | 5-11 | 173 | Junior | Topeka, Kansas |
| Terry Nooner | 5 | Guard | 5-10 | 170 | Freshman | Raytown, Missouri |
| Paul Pierce | 34 | Forward | 6–7 | 220 | Sophomore | Inglewood, California |
| Scot Pollard | 31 | Center | 6–11 | 265 | Senior | San Diego, California |
| T.J. Pugh | 32 | Forward/Center | 6–8 | 246 | Sophomore | Omaha, Nebraska |
| Steve Ransom | 42 | Forward | 6–6 | 205 | Senior | Mission Viejo, California |
| Ryan Robertson | 4 | Guard | 6–5 | 182 | Sophomore | Saint Charles, Missouri |
| Billy Thomas | 12 | Guard/Forward | 6–4 | 208 | Junior | Shreveport, Louisiana |
| Jacque Vaughn | 11 | Guard | 6–1 | 195 | Senior | Pasadena, California |
| B.J. Williams | 22 | Forward | 6–8 | 206 | Senior | Wichita, Kansas |

== Big 12 Conference standings ==
1996–97 Big 12 Conference men's basketball regular season standings
| # | Team | Conference | Pct. | Overall | Pct. |
|---|---|---|---|---|---|
| 1 | Kansas | 15-1 | .938 | 34-2 | .944 |
| 2 | Colorado | 11-5 | .688 | 22-10 | .688 |
| T–3 | Texas | 10-6 | .625 | 18-12 | .600 |
| T–3 | Iowa State | 10-6 | .625 | 22-9 | .710 |
| T–3 | Texas Tech | 10-6 | .625 | 19-9 | .679 |
| 6 | Oklahoma | 9-7 | .563 | 19-11 | .613 |
| T–7 | Nebraska | 7–9 | .438 | 18-15 | .545 |
| T–7 | Oklahoma State | 7-9 | .438 | 17-15 | .531 |
| 9 | Baylor | 6-10 | .375 | 18-12 | .600 |
| 10 | Missouri | 5-11 | .313 | 16-17 | .485 |
| T–11 | Texas A&M | 3-13 | .188 | 9-18 | .333 |
| T–11 | Kansas State | 3-13 | .188 | 10-17 | .370 |

== Schedule ==
| Date time, TV | Rank^{#} | Opponent^{#} | Result | Record | Site city, state |
Regular Season
| 11/22/1996* | No. 2 | at Santa Clara | W 76-64 | 1–0 | Leavey Center; Santa Clara, CA |
| 11/25/1996* | No. 2 | vs. LSU; Maui Invitational Tournament first round | W 82-53 | 2–0 | Lahaina Civic Center; Maui, HI |
| 11/26/1996* | No. 2 | vs. California; Maui Invitational Tournament Semifinals | W 85-67 | 3–0 | Lahaina Civic Center; Maui, HI |
| 11/27/1996* | No. 2 | vs. Virginia; Maui Invitational tournament championship Game | W 80-63 | 4–0 | Lahaina Civic Center; Maui, HI |
| 12/1/1996* | No. 2 | San Diego | W 79–72 | 5–0 | Allen Fieldhouse; Lawrence, KS |
| 12/4/1996* | No. 1 | vs. No. 4 Cincinnati; Great Eight | W 72–65 | 6–0 | United Center; Chicago, IL |
| 12/7/1996* | No. 1 | at No. 17 UCLA | W 96–83 | 7–0 | Pauley Pavilion; Los Angeles, CA |
| 12/11/1996* | No. 1 | George Washington | W 85–56 | 8–0 | Allen Fieldhouse; Lawnrence, KS |
| 12/15/1996* | No. 1 | UNC Asheville | W 105–73 | 9–0 | Allen Fieldhouse; Lawrence, KS |
| 12/21/1996* | No. 1 | NC State | W 84–56 | 10–0 | Allen Fieldhouse; Lawrence, KS |
| 12/30/1996* | No. 1 | Washburn | W 90–65 | 11–0 | Allen Fieldhouse; Lawrence, KS |
| 1/2/1997* | No. 1 | Brown | W 107–49 | 12–0 | Allen Fieldhouse; Lawrence, KS |
| 1/4/1997 | No. 1 | at Kansas State; Sunflower Showdown | W 62–59 | 13–0 (1–0) | Bramlage Coliseum; Manhattan, KS |
| 1/6/1997 | No. 1 | No. 18 Texas | W 86–61 | 14–0 (2–0) | Allen Fieldhouse; Lawrence, KS |
| 1/9/1997* | No. 1 | Niagara | W 134–73 | 15–0 | Allen Fieldhouse; Lawrence, KS |
| 1/11/1997 | No. 1 | at Baylor | W 87–68 | 16–0 (3–0) | Ferrell Center; Waco, TX |
| 1/13/1997 | No. 1 | No. 4 Iowa State | W 80–67 | 17–0 (4–0) | Allen Fieldhouse; Lawrence, KS |
| 1/19/1997* | No. 1 | at Connecticut | W 73–65 | 18–0 | Hartford Civic Center; Hartford, CT |
| 1/22/1997 | No. 1 | Texas A&M | W 89–60 | 19–0 (5–0) | Allen Fieldhouse; Lawrence, KS |
| 1/26/1997 | No. 1 | at No. 18 Colorado | W 77–68 | 20–0 (6–0) | Coors Events Center; Boulder, CO |
| 1/29/1997 | No. 1 | at No. 22 Texas Tech | W 86–77 | 21–0 (7–0) | Lubbock Municipal Coliseum; Lubbock, TX |
| 2/1/1997 | No. 1 | Nebraska | W 82–77 ^{OT} | 22–0 (8–0) | Allen Fieldhouse; Lawrence, KS |
| 2/4/1997 | No. 1 | at Missouri; Border War | L 94–96 ^{2OT} | 22–1 (8–1) | Hearnes Center; Columbia, MO |
| 2/9/1997 | No. 1 | at No. 6 Iowa State | W 69–62 | 23–1 (9–1) | Hilton Coliseum; Ames, IA |
| 2/12/1997 | No. 1 | Oklahoma State | W 104–72 | 24–1 (10–1) | Allen Fieldhouse; Lawrence, KS |
| 2/15/1997 | No. 1 | No. 15 Colorado | W 114–74 | 25–1 (11–1) | Allen Fieldhouse; Lawrence, KS |
| 2/17/1997 | No. 1 | Missouri; Border War | W 79–67 | 26–1 (12–1) | Allen Fieldhouse; Lawrence, KS |
| 2/22/1997 | No. 1 | Kansas State; Sunflower Showdown | W 78–58 | 27–1 (13–1) | Allen Fieldhouse; Lawrence, KS |
| 2/24/1997 | No. 1 | at Oklahoma | W 70–68 | 28–1 (14–1) | Lloyd Noble Center; Norman, OK |
| 3/2/1997 | No. 1 | at Nebraska | W 85–65 | 29–1 (15–1) | Bob Devaney Sports Center; Lincoln, NE |
Big 12 Tournament
| 3/7/1997 | No. 1 | vs. Oklahoma State; Quarterfinals | W 74–59 | 30–1 | Kemper Arena; Kansas City, MO |
| 3/8/1997 | No. 1 | vs. No. 16 Iowa State; Semifinals | W 72–48 | 31–1 | Kemper Arena; Kansas City, MO |
| 3/9/1997 | No. 1 | vs. Missouri; Championship Game | W 87–60 | 32–1 | Kemper Arena; Kansas City, MO |
NCAA tournament
| 3/13/1997* | (1 SE) No. 1 | vs. (16 SE) Jackson State; First round | W 78–64 | 33–1 | Pyramid Arena; Memphis, TN |
| 3/15/1997* | (1 SE) No. 1 | vs. (8 SE) Purdue; Second Round | W 75–61 | 34–1 | Pyramid Arena; Memphis, TN |
| 3/21/1997* | (1 SE) No. 1 | vs. (4 SE) No. 15 Arizona; Regional semifinals | L 82–85 | 34–2 | Birmingham-Jefferson Convention Complex; Birmingham, AL |
*Non-conference game. ^{#}Rankings from AP Poll, NCAA tournament seeds shown in parentheses. (#) Tournament seedings in parentheses. SE=Southeast. All times are in Central Standard Time.

== Rankings ==
Ranking movements Legend: ██ Increase in ranking ██ Decrease in ranking
| | Week | | | | | | | | | | | | | | | | | | |
| Poll | Pre | 1 | 2 | 3 | 4 | 5 | 6 | 7 | 8 | 9 | 10 | 11 | 12 | 13 | 14 | 15 | 16 | 17 | Final |
|---|---|---|---|---|---|---|---|---|---|---|---|---|---|---|---|---|---|---|---|
| AP | 2 | 2 | 2 | 1 | 1 | 1 | 1 | 1 | 1 | 1 | 1 | 1 | 1 | 1 | 1 | 1 | 1 | 1 | Not released |
| Coaches | 1 | 1* | 2 | 1 | 1 | 1 | 1 | 1 | 1 | 1 | 1 | 1 | 1 | 1 | 1 | 1 | 1 | 1 | 5 |

*There was no coaches poll in week 1.

== Team players in the 1997 NBA draft ==
| Round | Pick | Player | NBA club |
|---|---|---|---|
| 1 | 19 | Scot Pollard | Detroit Pistons |
| 1 | 27 | Jacque Vaughn | Utah Jazz |
