= 2007–08 Coppin State Eagles men's basketball team =

American college basketball season

2007–08 Coppin State Eagles men's basketball
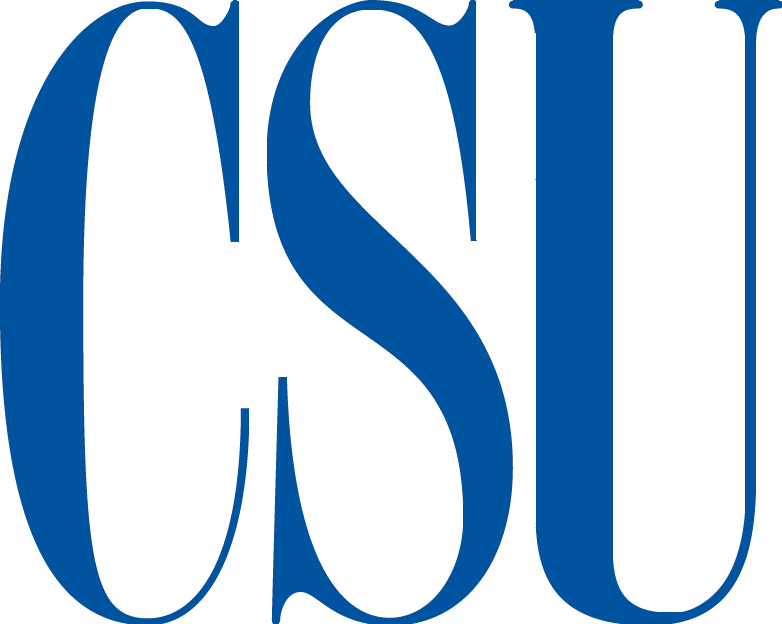

MEAC tournament champions

NCAA tournament, Play-in Game
- Conference: Mid-Eastern Athletic Conference
- Record: 16–21 (7–9 MEAC)
- Head coach: Fang Mitchell (22nd season)
- Home arena: Coppin Center

2007–08 MEAC men's basketball standings
	Conf.				Overall
Team	W		L	PCT	W		L	PCT
Morgan State	14	–	2	.875	22	–	11	.667
Hampton	11	–	5	.688	18	–	12	.600
Norfolk State	11	–	5	.688	16	–	15	.516
Delaware State	10	–	6	.625	14	–	16	.467
North Carolina A&T	9	–	7	.563	15	–	16	.484
Florida A&M	9	–	7	.563	15	–	17	.469
Coppin State †	7	–	9	.438	16	–	21	.432
South Carolina State	7	–	9	.438	13	–	20	.394
Bethune–Cookman	5	–	11	.313	11	–	21	.344
Howard	3	–	13	.188	6	–	26	.188
Maryland Eastern Shore	2	–	14	.125	4	–	28	.125
Winston-Salem State		–		–	12	–	18	.400
† 2008 MEAC tournament winner Rankings from AP Poll

The 2007–08 Coppin State Eagles men's basketball team represented Coppin State University during the 2007–08 NCAA Division I men's basketball season. The Eagles, led by 22nd year head coach Fang Mitchell, played their home games at the Coppin Center and were members of the Mid-Eastern Athletic Conference. Despite losing 19 of their first 23 games and starting 0–8 in MEAC play, Coppin State finished the regular season 12–20 (7–9 MEAC). The Eagles then went on an unexpected run to win the MEAC tournament title (upsetting the top three seeds, including Morgan State in the title game) to receive an automatic bid to the NCAA tournament as one of two No. 16 seeds in the East region. In the Play-in Game, Coppin State lost to Mount St. Mary's, 69–60.

== Roster ==
2007–08 Coppin State Eagles men's basketball team
Players	Coaches
Pos. / # / Name / Height / Weight / Year / Previous school / Hometown; G / 22 / Tywain McKee / 6 ft 2 in (1.88 m) / 182 lb (83 kg) / Jr / Philadelphia, Pennsylvania	Head coach: Fang Mitchell; Assistant coach(es) Legend: (C) Team captain; (S) Suspended; (I) Ineligible; (W) Walk-on; Injured; Current redshirt

== Schedule and results ==
Date time, TV	Rank^{#}	Opponent^{#}	Result	Record	Site (attendance) city, state
Regular season
Nov 9, 2007*		vs. Saint Paul's; Hornet Invitational	W 69–65	1–0	Memorial Hall; Dover, Delaware
Nov 10, 2007*		vs. Allen; Hornet Invitational	W 72–61	2–0	Memorial Hall; Dover, Delaware
Nov 18, 2007*		at Kent State	L 51–74	2–1	Memorial Athletic and Convocation Center; Kent, Ohio
Nov 20, 2007*		at Xavier	L 49–98	2–2	Cintas Center; Cincinnati, Ohio
Nov 23, 2007*		vs. Southeast Missouri State	W 102–99 ^{2OT}	3–2	Sears Centre; Hoffman Estates, Illinois
Nov 24, 2007*		vs. UNC Wilmington	L 57–78	3–3	Sears Centre; Hoffman Estates, Illinois
Nov 27, 2007*		at Hawaii	L 58–79	3–4	Stan Sheriff Center; Honolulu, Hawaii
Dec 1, 2007		Morgan State	L 50–78	3–5 (0–1)	Coppin Center; Baltimore, Maryland
Dec 8, 2007*		at Arizona State	L 43–60	3–6	Wells Fargo Arena; Tempe, Arizona
Dec 10, 2007*		at Ohio State	L 39–47	3–7	Value City Arena; Columbus, Ohio
Dec 15, 2007*		at Dayton	L 34–66	3–8	University of Dayton Arena; Dayton, Ohio
Dec 21, 2007*		at No. 10 Marquette	L 42–89	3–9	Bradley Center; Milwaukee, Wisconsin
Dec 22, 2007*		at No. 13 Indiana	L 46–73	3–10	Assembly Hall; Bloomington, Indiana
Dec 27, 2007*		at Missouri	L 38–72	3–11	Mizzou Arena; Columbia, Missouri
Jan 12, 2008		at Norfolk State	L 60–65	3–12 (0–2)	Joseph G. Echols Memorial Hall; Norfolk, Virginia
Jan 14, 2008		at North Carolina A&T	L 56–59	3–13 (0–3)	Corbett Sports Center; Greensboro, North Carolina
Jan 16, 2008*		at North Carolina Central	W 66–62	4–13	McLendon–McDougald Gymnasium; Durham, North Carolina
Jan 19, 2008		Bethune-Cookman	L 55–56 ^{OT}	4–14 (0–4)	Coppin Center; Baltimore, Maryland
Jan 21, 2008		Florida A&M	L 48–63	4–15 (0–5)	Coppin Center; Baltimore, Maryland
Jan 26, 2008		at Hampton	L 54–56	4–16 (0–6)	Hampton Convocation Center; Hampton, Virginia
Jan 28, 2008		at Howard	L 69–73 ^{OT}	4–17 (0–7)	Burr Gymnasium; Washington, D.C.
Jan 30, 2008*		North Carolina Central	L 65–67	4–18	Coppin Center; Baltimore, Maryland
Feb 2, 2008		Delaware State	L 48–56	4–19 (0–8)	Coppin Center; Baltimore, Maryland
Feb 4, 2008		Maryland-Eastern Shore	W 59–54	5–19 (1–8)	Coppin Center; Baltimore, Maryland
Feb 9, 2008		South Carolina State	W 79–67	6–19 (2–8)	Coppin Center; Baltimore, Maryland
Feb 11, 2008*		Winston-Salem State	W 62–44	7–19	Coppin Center; Baltimore, Maryland
Feb 16, 2008		at Bethune-Cookman	W 64–58	8–19 (3–8)	Moore Gymnasium; Daytona Beach, Florida
Feb 18, 2008		at Florida A&M	W 69–68	9–19 (4–8)	Jake Gaither Gymnasium; Tallahassee, Florida
Feb 23, 2008		Hampton	W 72–55	10–19 (5–8)	Coppin Center; Baltimore, Maryland
Feb 25, 2008		Howard	W 68–45	11–19 (6–8)	Coppin Center; Baltimore, Maryland
Mar 1, 2008		at Maryland-Eastern Shore	W 85–66	12–19 (7–8)	Hytche Athletic Center; Princess Anne, Maryland
Mar 6, 2008		at Morgan State	L 64–68	12–20 (7–9)	Hill Field House; Baltimore, Maryland
MEAC tournament
Mar 11, 2008*		vs. Howard; First Round	W 55–54	13–20	RBC Center; Raleigh, North Carolina
Mar 12, 2008*		vs. Hampton; Quarterfinals	W 75–74 ^{OT}	14–20	RBC Center; Raleigh, North Carolina
Mar 14, 2008*		vs. Norfolk State; Semifinals	W 67–65	15–20	RBC Center; Raleigh, North Carolina
Mar 15, 2008*		vs. Morgan State; Championship Game	W 62–60	16–20	RBC Center; Raleigh, North Carolina
NCAA tournament
Mar 18, 2008*	(16 E)	vs. (16 E) Mount St. Mary's; Play-in Game	L 60–69	16–21	University of Dayton Arena; Dayton, Ohio
*Non-conference game. ^{#}Rankings from AP Poll. (#) Tournament seedings in parentheses. E=East. All times are in Eastern Time.
