= 1997 MEAC men's basketball tournament =

- Classification: Division I
- Season: 1996–97
- Teams: 9
- Site: Joseph G. Echols Memorial Hall; Norfolk, Virginia
- Champions: Coppin State (3rd title)
- Winning coach: Fang Mitchell (3rd title)
- MVP: Terquin Mott (Coppin State)

1996–97 MEAC men's basketball standings
	Conf.				Overall
Team	W		L	PCT	W		L	PCT
Coppin State †	15	–	3	.833	22	–	9	.710
South Carolina State	12	–	6	.667	14	–	14	.500
North Carolina A&T	11	–	7	.611	15	–	13	.536
Bethune–Cookman	9	–	9	.500	12	–	16	.429
Morgan State	8	–	10	.444	9	–	18	.333
Florida A&M	8	–	10	.444	8	–	19	.296
Hampton	7	–	11	.389	8	–	19	.296
Delaware State	7	–	11	.389	7	–	20	.259
Howard	7	–	11	.389	7	–	20	.259
Maryland Eastern Shore	6	–	12	.333	11	–	17	.393
† 1997 MEAC tournament winner Rankings from AP Poll

The 1997 Mid-Eastern Athletic Conference men's basketball tournament took place March 3–8, 1997, at Joseph G. Echols Memorial Hall in Norfolk, Virginia. Coppin State defeated North Carolina A&T, 81–74 (OT) in the championship game, to win its second MEAC Tournament title.

The Eagles earned an automatic bid to the 1997 NCAA tournament as #15 seed in the East region. In the round of 64, Coppin State upset #2 seed South Carolina 78–65. It was the first win for a MEAC team in the NCAA Tournament, the first time a #15 seed won an NCAA Tournament game by double figures, and only the third time a #15 seed beat a #2 seed.

== Format ==
Nine of ten conference members participated, with the top 8 teams receiving a bye to the quarterfinal round.

== Bracket ==
First round March 3
8	Howard	70
9	Maryland Eastern Shore	76

Quarterfinals; March 5–6
1	Coppin State	90
9	Maryland Eastern Shore	88
4	Bethune–Cookman	70
5	Florida A&M	61
3	North Carolina A&T	65
6	Morgan State	54
2	South Carolina State	85
7	Delaware State	82^{OT}

Semifinals; March 7
1	Coppin State	76
4	Bethune–Cookman	70
3	North Carolina A&T	54
2	South Carolina State	49

Final; March 8
1	Coppin State	81
3	North Carolina A&T	74^{OT}
