= 1996–97 Missouri Tigers men's basketball team =

American college basketball season

1996–97 Missouri Tigers men's basketball
- Conference: Big 12 Conference
- Record: 16–17 (5–11 Big 12)
- Head coach: Norm Stewart (30th season)
- Assistant coaches: Kim Anderson (6th season); Rich Daly (14th season); Lee Winfield (5th season)
- Captains: Chip Walther; Game captains
- Home arena: Hearnes Center

1996–97 Big 12 men's basketball standings
	Conf.				Overall
Team	W		L	PCT	W		L	PCT
No. 1 Kansas †	15	–	1	.938	34	–	2	.944
No. 24 Colorado	11	–	5	.688	22	–	10	.688
Texas	10	–	6	.625	18	–	12	.600
No. 18 Iowa State	10	–	6	.625	22	–	9	.710
Texas Tech	10	–	6	.625	19	–	9	.679
Oklahoma	9	–	7	.563	19	–	11	.633
Nebraska	7	–	9	.438	18	–	15	.545
Oklahoma State	7	–	9	.438	17	–	15	.531
Baylor	6	–	10	.375	18	–	12	.600
Missouri	5	–	11	.313	16	–	17	.485
Texas A&M	3	–	13	.188	9	–	18	.333
Kansas State	3	–	13	.188	10	–	17	.370
† 1997 Big 12 Tournament winner Rankings from AP poll

The 1996–97 Missouri Tigers men's basketball team represented the University of Missouri during the 1996–97 men's college basketball season. The highlights of the season included upsetting rival and number-one ranked Kansas at home in double overtime and an unexpected run to the finals of the Big 12 tournament.

== Schedule ==
Date time, TV	Rank^{#}	Opponent^{#}	Result	Record	Site city, state
November 23* no		Chicago State	W 76–46	1–0	Hearnes Center; Columbia, MO
November 29* no		vs. Tennessee-Chattanooga; San Juan Shootout	W 83–74	2–0	Caguas Municipal Complex; San Juan, Puerto Rico
November 30* no		vs. No. 10 Clemson; San Juan Shootout	L 45–47	2–1	Caguas Municipal Complex; San Juan, Puerto Rico
December 1* no		vs. Creighton; San Juan Shootout	W 73–71 ^{OT}	3–1	Caguas Municipal Complex; San Juan, Puerto Rico
December 4* no		Arkansas State	W 81–47	4–1	Hearnes Center; Columbia, MO
December 7* no, ESPN		No. 22 Arkansas	L 76–80	4–2	Hearnes Center; Columbia, MO
December 15* no		Southeast Missouri	W 64–50	5–2	Hearnes Center; Columbia, MO
December 17* no		Northwest Missouri	W 77–56	6–2	Hearnes Center; Columbia, MO
December 19* no		Mercer	W 90–63	7–2	Hearnes Center; Columbia, MO
December 21* no, ESPN		at Iowa	L 77–88	7–3	Carver–Hawkeye Arena; Iowa City, IA
December 28* no		at Illinois; Braggin' Rights	L 69–85	7–4	Assembly Hall; Champaign, IL
December 30* no		Southern	W 111–69	8–4	Hearnes Center; Columbia, MO
January 4 no		No. 4 Iowa State	L 65–68	8–5 (0–1)	Hearnes Center; Columbia, MO
January 7 no		Colorado	L 78–87	8–6 (0–2)	Hearnes Center; Columbia, MO
January 11 no		at Oklahoma State	L 67–68	8–7 (0–3)	Gallagher-Iba Arena; Stillwater, OK
January 14 no		Baylor	W 82–66	9–7 (1–3)	Hearnes Center; Columbia, MO
January 18 no, ESPN		at Nebraska	L 53–76	9–8 (1–4)	Bob Devaney Sports Center; Lincoln, NE
January 22 no		Nebraska	W 75–74	10–8 (2–4)	Hearnes Center; Columbia, MO
January 26 no, CBS		at No. 23 Texas	L 75–80	10–9 (2–5)	Frank Erwin Center; Austin, TX
January 28 no		at Texas A&M	L 57–61	10–10 (2–6)	G. Rollie White Coliseum; College Station, TX
February 1 no		Kansas State	W 85–63	11–10 (3–6)	Hearnes Center; Columbia, MO
February 4 no		No. 1 Kansas; Border War	W 96–94 ^{2OT}	12–10 (4–6)	Hearnes Center; Columbia, MO
February 9* no, ABC		No. 2 Wake Forest	L 65–73	12–11 (4–6)	Hearnes Center; Columbia, MO
February 12 no		at No. 9 Iowa State	L 59–87	12–12 (4–7)	Hilton Coliseum; Ames, IA
February 15 no		Oklahoma	W 80–73	13–12 (5–7)	Hearnes Center; Columbia, MO
February 17 no, ESPN		at No. 1 Kansas; Border War	L 67–79	13–13 (5–8)	Allen Fieldhouse; Lawrence, KS
February 22 no		at No. 21 Colorado	L 75–84	13–14 (5–9)	Coors Events Center; Boulder, CO
February 25 no		Texas Tech	L 73–84	13–15 (5–10)	Hearnes Center; Columbia, MO
March 1 no		at Kansas State	L 60–76	13–16 (5–11)	Bramlage Coliseum; Manhattan, KS
March 6* no		vs. Nebraska; Big 12 Tournament	W 78–72	14–16	Kemper Arena; Kansas City, MO
March 7* no		vs. Texas; Big 12 Tournament	W 80–75	15–16	Kemper Arena; Kansas City, MO
March 8* no		vs. Oklahoma; Big 12 Tournament	W 89–80	16–16	Kemper Arena; Kansas City, MO
March 9* no, CBS		vs. No. 1 Kansas; Big 12 Tournament	L 60–87	16–17	Kemper Arena; Kansas City, MO
*Non-conference game. ^{#}Rankings from AP Poll. (#) Tournament seedings in parentheses.

Note: Texas Tech later forfeited its win due to ineligible players.
