= 1996–97 Nebraska Cornhuskers men's basketball team =

American college basketball season

1996–97 Nebraska Cornhuskers men's basketball

NIT, Quarterfinals
- Conference: Big 12 Conference
- Record: 18-15 (7-9 Big 12)
- Head coach: Danny Nee (11th season)
- Assistant coaches: Scott Howard; Bill Johnson; Randy Roth; Jimmy Williams
- Home arena: Bob Devaney Sports Center

1996–97 Big 12 men's basketball standings
	Conf.				Overall
Team	W		L	PCT	W		L	PCT
No. 1 Kansas †	15	–	1	.938	34	–	2	.944
No. 24 Colorado	11	–	5	.688	22	–	10	.688
Texas	10	–	6	.625	18	–	12	.600
No. 18 Iowa State	10	–	6	.625	22	–	9	.710
Texas Tech	10	–	6	.625	19	–	9	.679
Oklahoma	9	–	7	.563	19	–	11	.633
Nebraska	7	–	9	.438	18	–	15	.545
Oklahoma State	7	–	9	.438	17	–	15	.531
Baylor	6	–	10	.375	18	–	12	.600
Missouri	5	–	11	.313	16	–	17	.485
Texas A&M	3	–	13	.188	9	–	18	.333
Kansas State	3	–	13	.188	10	–	17	.370
† 1997 Big 12 Tournament winner Rankings from AP poll

The 1996–97 Nebraska Cornhuskers men's basketball team represented the University of Nebraska–Lincoln during the 1996–97 college basketball season. Led by head coach Danny Nee (11th season), the Cornhuskers competed in the Big Twelve Conference and played their home games at the Bob Devaney Sports Center. They finished with a record of 18–15 overall and a 7–9 record in Big Twelve Conference play. Nebraska played in the National Invitation Tournament, and advanced to the third round.

== Roster ==
1996–97 Nebraska Cornhuskers men's basketball team
Players
Coaches

Pos.	#	Name	Height	Weight	Year	Previous school	Hometown
C	4	Venson Hamilton	6 ft 9 in (2.06 m)	240 lb (109 kg)	So	Oak Hill Academy	Forest City, NC
F	5	Larry Florence	6 ft 5 in (1.96 m)	225 lb (102 kg)	So	Central	Phenix City, AL
G	10	Tyronn Lue	6 ft 0 in (1.83 m)	170 lb (77 kg)	So	Raytown	Mexico, MO
G	11	Alvin Mitchell	6 ft 0 in (1.83 m)	160 lb (73 kg)	So	Omaha Burke	Omaha, NE
F	13	Bernard Garner	6 ft 7 in (2.01 m)	245 lb (111 kg)	Sr	Many	Many, LA
F	15	Ryan Hinckley	6 ft 4 in (1.93 m)	215 lb (98 kg)	Jr	Highland	Pocatello, ID
G	20	Andy Schwindt	6 ft 3 in (1.91 m)	180 lb (82 kg)	Fr	Peninsula	Palos Verdes, CA
G	24	Michael Johnette	6 ft 4 in (1.93 m)	215 lb (98 kg)	Jr	Millard North	Omaha, NE
G	30	Cookie Belcher	6 ft 3 in (1.91 m)	200 lb (91 kg)	Fr	Mexico	Mexico, MO
C	32	Mikki Moore	6 ft 11 in (2.11 m)	220 lb (100 kg)	Sr	Blacksburg	Gaffney, SC
F	34	Troy Piatkowski	6 ft 5 in (1.96 m)	200 lb (91 kg)	So	Stevens	Rapid City, SD
G	35	Ryan Phifer	6 ft 3 in (1.91 m)	190 lb (86 kg)	Jr	North Platte	North Platte, NE
F	40	Chad Burbach	6 ft 6 in (1.98 m)	180 lb (82 kg)	Jr	Columbus	Columbus, NE
F	44	Andy Markowski	6 ft 8 in (2.03 m)	210 lb (95 kg)	So	Ord	Ord, NE

Head coach

Danny Nee

Assistant coach(es)

- Scott Howard
- Bill Johnson
- Randy Roth
- Jimmy Williams

Legend

- (C) Team captain
- (S) Suspended
- (I) Ineligible
- (W) Walk-on
- Injured
- Current redshirt

Roster
Last update: May 17, 2024

== Schedule and results ==
Date time, TV	Rank^{#}	Opponent^{#}	Result	Record	Site city, state
Regular season
Nov 23, 1996*		at No. 17 Texas	L 81-83 ^{OT}	0-1	Frank Erwin Center; Austin, Texas
Nov 26, 1996*		Weber State	W 83-66	1-1	Bob Devaney Sports Center; Lincoln, Nebraska
Nov 30, 1996*		Oregon State	W 75-67	2-1	Bob Devaney Sports Center; Lincoln, Nebraska
Dec 3, 1996*		UT-San Antonio	W 79-76	3-1	Bob Devaney Sports Center; Lincoln, Nebraska
Dec 6, 1996*		Coppin State; Ameritas Classic	W 88-72	4-1	Bob Devaney Sports Center; Lincoln, Nebraska
Dec 7, 1996		Bowling Green; Ameritas Classic	W 73-68	5-1	Bob Devaney Sports Center; Lincoln, Nebraska
Dec 11, 1996*		at UM-Kansas City	W 76-64	6-1	Municipal Auditorium; Kansas City, Missouri
Dec 21, 1996*		No. 16 Minnesota	L 56-70	6-2	Bob Devaney Sports Center; Lincoln, Nebraska
Dec 30, 1996*		vs. No. Old Dominion; Puerto Rico Holiday Classic	W 72-66	7-2	Eugene Guerra Sports Complex; Bayamón, Puerto Rico
Dec 31, 1997*		vs. No. 6 Cincinnati; Puerto Rico Holiday Classic	L 73-84	7-3	Eugene Guerra Sports Complex; Bayamón, Puerto Rico
Jan 1, 1997*		vs. Bowling Green; Puerto Rico Holiday Classic	L 55-58	7-4	Eugene Guerra Sports Complex; Bayamón, Puerto Rico
Jan 4, 1996		Colorado	L 73-79	7-5 (0-1)	CU Events Center; Boulder, Colorado
Jan 8, 1997		Creighton; Rivalry	W 71-52	8-5	Bob Devaney Sports Center; Lincoln, Nebraska
Jan 11, 1997		Texas A&M	W 74-72	9-5 (1-1)	Bob Devaney Sports Center; Lincoln, Nebraska
Jan 15, 1997		Kansas State	W 87-77 ^{OT}	10-5 (2-1)	Bob Devaney Sports Center; Lincoln, Nebraska
Jan 18, 1997		Missouri	W 76-53	11-5 (3-1)	Bob Devaney Sports Center; Lincoln, Nebraska
Jan 22, 1997		at Missouri	L 74-75	11-6 (3-2)	Hearnes Center; Columbia, Missouri
Jan 25, 1997		at Oklahoma	L 77-84	11-7 (3-3)	Lloyd Noble Center; Norman, Oklahoma
Jan 29, 1997		No. 11 Iowa State	L 67-77	11-8 (3-4)	Bob Devaney Sports Center; Lincoln, Nebraska
Feb 1, 1997		at No. 1 Kansas	L 77-82 ^{OT}	11-9 (3-5)	Allen Fieldhouse; Lawrence, Kansas
Feb 5, 1997		No. 15 Colorado	W 77-69	12-9 (4-5)	Bob Devaney Sports Center; Lincoln, Nebraska
Feb 8, 1997		at No. 23 Texas Tech	L 74-87	12-10 (4-6)	Lubbock Municipal Coliseum; Lubbock, Texas
Feb 10, 1997		at Kansas State	L 53-61	12-11 (4-7)	Bramlage Coliseum; Manhattan, Kansas
Feb 13, 1997*		at Northern Iowa	W 77-69	13-11	UNI-Dome; Cedar Falls, Iowa
Feb 16, 1997		No. 15 Texas	W 79-67	14-11 (5-7)	Bob Devaney Sports Center; Lincoln, Nebraska
Feb 19, 1997		at Baylor	L 60-71	14-12 (5-8)	Ferrell Center; Waco, Texas
Feb 22, 1997		at No. 7 Iowa State	W 74-69 ^{OT}	15-12 (6-8)	Hilton Coliseum; Ames, Iowa
Feb 26, 1997		Oklahoma State	W 77-68	16-12 (7-8)	Bob Devaney Sports Center; Lincoln, Nebraska
Mar 2, 1997		No. 1 Kansas	L 65-85	16-13 (7-9)	Bob Devaney Sports Center; Lincoln, Nebraska
Big 12 Tournament
Mar 6, 1997		vs. Missouri; Quarterfinals	L 72-78	16-14	Kemper Arena; Kansas City, MO
NIT
Mar 12, 1997*		Washington; First round	W 67-63	17–14	Bob Devaney Sports Center; Lincoln, Nebraska
Mar 18, 1997*		at Nevada; Second round	W 78-68	18–14	Lawlor Events Center; Reno, Nevada
Mar 18, 1997*		at UConn; Quarterfinals	L 67-76	18–15	Harry A. Gampel Pavilion; Storrs, Connecticut
*Non-conference game. ^{#}Rankings from AP poll. (#) Tournament seedings in parentheses. All times are in Central Time.
