= 1996–97 Colorado Buffaloes men's basketball team =

American college basketball season

1996–97 Colorado Buffaloes men's basketball

NCAA tournament, Round of 32
- Conference: Big 12 Conference

Ranking
- Coaches: No. 25
- AP: No. 24
- Record: 22–10 (11–5 Big 12)
- Head coach: Ricardo Patton (1st season)
- Home arena: Coors Events Center

1996–97 Big 12 men's basketball standings
	Conf.				Overall
Team	W		L	PCT	W		L	PCT
No. 1 Kansas †	15	–	1	.938	34	–	2	.944
No. 24 Colorado	11	–	5	.688	22	–	10	.688
Texas	10	–	6	.625	18	–	12	.600
No. 18 Iowa State	10	–	6	.625	22	–	9	.710
Texas Tech	10	–	6	.625	19	–	9	.679
Oklahoma	9	–	7	.563	19	–	11	.633
Nebraska	7	–	9	.438	18	–	15	.545
Oklahoma State	7	–	9	.438	17	–	15	.531
Baylor	6	–	10	.375	18	–	12	.600
Missouri	5	–	11	.313	16	–	17	.485
Texas A&M	3	–	13	.188	9	–	18	.333
Kansas State	3	–	13	.188	10	–	17	.370
† 1997 Big 12 Tournament winner Rankings from AP poll

The 1996–97 Colorado Buffaloes Men's basketball team represented the University of Colorado in the 1996–97 season. Led by first-year head coach Ricardo Patton, and sophomore Guard Chauncey Billups, the Buffaloes made the NCAA tournament despite only having won nine games the previous year. Billups, was particularly impressive this particular season. Billups earned Big 12 Player of the year honors as well as all-American honors. Following this season, Billups would declare his eligibility for the NBA draft, being selected third overall in 1997. Following his career end, Billups' number would be retired by the Buffaloes. As Head Coach of the Buffaloes, Patton had been appointed after having been named interim head coach the prior season. Patton would stay head coach of the Buffaloes until 2007.

== Roster ==
1996–97 Colorado Buffaloes men's basketball team
Players
Coaches

Pos.	#	Name	Height	Weight	Year	Previous school	Hometown
F	3	Martice Moore	6 ft 8 in (2.03 m)	234 lb (106 kg)	Sr	Oak Hill	Atlanta, GA
G	4	Chauncey Billups	6 ft 3 in (1.91 m)	191 lb (87 kg)	So	George Washington	Denver, CO
G	5	Howard Frier	6 ft 3 in (1.91 m)	185 lb (84 kg)	Jr	Nansemond River	Suffolk, VA
F	10	Will Smith	6 ft 6 in (1.98 m)	206 lb (93 kg)	Fr	Hamilton	Memphis, TN
G	12	Marlon Hughes	6 ft 0 in (1.83 m)	181 lb (82 kg)	Jr	Hillcrest	Chicago, IL
F/C	13	Charlie Melvin	6 ft 10 in (2.08 m)	200 lb (91 kg)	Jr	Los Alamos	Los Alamos, NM
G	21	Devon Gilchrist	6 ft 4 in (1.93 m)	185 lb (84 kg)	So	Saint Thomas Academy	Minneapolis, MN
F	31	Fred Edmonds	6 ft 6 in (1.98 m)	200 lb (91 kg)	Sr	George Washington	Denver, CO
G	32	Alan Barksdale	6 ft 3 in (1.91 m)	195 lb (88 kg)	Fr	Central	Livingston, LA
F	42	Greg Jensen	6 ft 7 in (2.01 m)	210 lb (95 kg)	Sr	Eagle Grove	Eagle Grove, IA
C	45	Dennis Griffin	6 ft 9 in (2.06 m)	247 lb (112 kg)	Sr		Thatcher, AZ
C	52	Ronnie DeGray	6 ft 6 in (1.98 m)	195 lb (88 kg)	Jr	Leesville	Leesville, LA

Head coach

- Ricardo Patton

Assistant coach(es)

Legend

- (C) Team captain
- (S) Suspended
- (I) Ineligible
- (W) Walk-on
- Injured
- Current redshirt

Roster

== Schedule and results ==
Date time, TV	Rank^{#}	Opponent^{#}	Result	Record	Site city, state
Exhibition
Nov 15, 1996*		Marathon	W 78–72		CU Events/Conference Center (1,812); Boulder, Colorado
Nov 19, 1996*		No. Melbourne	W 82–74		CU Events/Conference Center (1,638); Boulder, Colorado
Non-conference regular season
Nov 24, 1996*		Drake	W 82–80 ^{OT}	1–0	CU Events/Conference Center (2,322); Boulder, Colorado
Nov 29, 1996*		vs. Auburn; Big Island Invitational	W 78–72 ^{OT}	2–0	Afook-Chinen Civic Auditorium; Hilo, Hawaii
Nov 30, 1996*		vs. Virginia Tech; Big Island Invitational	W 63–56	3–0	Afook-Chinen Civic Auditorium; Hilo, Hawaii
Dec 1, 1996*		vs. Louisville; Big Island Invitational	L 82–92	3–1	Afook-Chinen Civic Auditorium; Hilo, Hawaii
Dec 5, 1996*		Texas–Arlington	W 81–52	3–1	CU Events/Conference Center (2,307); Boulder, Colorado
Dec 7, 1996*		at George Mason	L 81–85	3–2	Patriot Center (2,481); Fairfax, Virginia
Dec 10, 1996*		at Wyoming	W 84–68	4–2	Arena-Auditorium (7,395); Laramie, Wyoming
Dec 12, 1996*		Colorado State	W 76–69	5–3	CU Events/Conference Center (5,219); Boulder, Colorado
Dec 21, 1996*		UC Santa Barbara	W 76–55	6–3	CU Events/Conference Center (2,716); Boulder, Colorado
Dec 23, 1996*		at Georgia	L 52–62	7–3	Stegeman Coliseum (6,458); Athens, Georgia
Dec 28, 1996*		at Missouri–Kansas City	W 82–61	8–3	Municipal Auditorium (4,481); Kansas City, Missouri
Dec 30, 1996*		Northwestern State	W 82–70	9–3	CU Events/Conference Center (1,721); Boulder, Colorado
Big 12 Regular Season
Jan 4, 1997		Nebraska	W 79–73	10–3 (1–0)	CU Events/Conference Center (3,164); Boulder, Colorado
Jan 7, 1997		Missouri	W 87–78	11–3 (2–0)	CU Events/Conference Center (13,300); Boulder, Colorado
Jan 11, 1997		at No. 20 Texas Tech	W 80–78	12–3 (3–0)	Lubbock Municipal Coliseum (8,174); Lubbock, Texas
Jan 15, 1997		Oklahoma State	W 78–74 ^{OT}	13–3 (4–0)	CU Events/Conference Center (8,447); Boulder, Colorado
Jan 18, 1997		No. 8 Iowa State	W 70–45	14–3 (5–0)	CU Events/Conference Center (8,278); Boulder, Colorado
Jan 21, 1997	No. 18	at Baylor	W 74–70	15–3 (6–0)	Ferrell Center (5,215); Waco, Texas
Jan 26, 1997	No. 18	No. 1 Kansas	L 68–77	15–4 (6–1)	CU Events/Conference Center (11,198); Boulder, Colorado
Jan 29, 1997	No. 18	at Kansas State	W 69–60	16–4 (7–1)	Bramlage Coliseum (8,970); Manhattan, Kansas
Feb 5, 1997	No. 15	at Nebraska	L 69–77	16–5 (7–2)	Bob Devaney Sports Center (12,398); Lincoln, Nebraska
Feb 8, 1997	No. 15	Texas A&M	W 77–64	17–5 (8–2)	CU Events/Conference Center (6,802); Boulder, Colorado
Feb 12, 1997	No. 15	at Oklahoma	L 66–91	17–6 (8–3)	Lloyd Noble Center (10,517); Norman, Oklahoma
Feb 15, 1997	No. 15	at No. 1 Kansas	L 74–114	17–7 (8–4)	Allen Fieldhouse (16,300); Lawrence, Kansas
Feb 19, 1997	No. 21	Kansas State	W 67–57	18–7 (9–4)	CU Events/Conference Center (5,072); Boulder, Colorado
Feb 22, 1997	No. 21	Missouri	W 84–75	19–7 (10–4)	CU Events/Conference Center (9,947); Boulder, Colorado
Feb 24, 1997*	No. 19	Wofford	W 65–58	20–7	CU Events/Conference Center (3,209); Boulder, Colorado
Feb 26, 1997	No. 19	at No. 13 Iowa State	L 54–65	20–8 (10–5)	Hilton Coliseum (14,020); Ames, Iowa
Mar 1, 1997	No. 19	Texas	W 83–60	21–8 (11–5)	CU Events/Conference Center (10,547); Boulder, Colorado
Big 12 Tournament
Mar 7, 1997*	No. 18	vs. Oklahoma; Quarterfinals	L 41–55	21–9	Kemper Arena (17,300); Kansas City, Missouri
NCAA Tournament
Mar 13, 1997*	(9 E) No. 24	vs. (8 E) Indiana; East Region – first round	W 80–62	22–9	Lawrence Joel Coliseum (14,368); Winston-Salem, North Carolina
Mar 15, 1997*	(9 E) No. 24	vs. (1 E) No. 4 North Carolina; East Region – second round	L 56–73	22–10	Lawrence Joel Coliseum (14,368); Winston-Salem, North Carolina
*Non-conference game. ^{#}Rankings from AP Poll. (#) Tournament seedings in parentheses. E=East. All times are in Mountain Time.

=== Postseason Schedule ===
Big 12 Tournament
Quarterfinal Vs. Oklahoma, Kemper Arena, Kansas City, MO - L, 41-55
NCAA Tournament
First Round Vs. Indiana, Lawrence Joel Veterans Memorial Coliseum, Winston-Salem, NC - W, 80-62
Round of 32 Vs. North Carolina, Lawrence Joel Veterans Memorial Coliseum, Winston-Salem, NC - L, 56-73

== Awards and honors ==
- Chauncey Billups – First-team All-Big 12, Consensus Second-team All-American

== Team players in the 1997 NBA draft ==
Round	Pick	Player	NBA Club
1	3	Chauncey Billups	Boston Celtics
