= Fang Mitchell =

American basketball player-coach

Biographical details
- Born: February 8, 1948 (age 78); Philadelphia, Pennsylvania, U.S.
- Education: Thomas Edison State College; Coppin State University

Playing career
- 1969–1971: Gloucester County CC

Coaching career (HC unless noted)
- 1978–1986: Gloucester County CC
- 1986–2014: Coppin State

Head coaching record
- Overall: 429–417 (college); 227–46 (junior college)
- Tournaments: 1–4 (NCAA Division I); 1–2 (NIT)

Accomplishments and honors

Championships
- 10 MEAC regular season (1990, 1991, 1993–1999, 2004); 4 MEAC tournament (1990, 1993, 1997, 2008)

Awards
- 6× MEAC Coach of the Year (1990, 1991, 1993, 1994, 1998, 2004)

Ronald L. "Fang" Mitchell (born February 8, 1948) is an American college basketball coach and the former head men's basketball coach at Coppin State University.

== Early life, education, and business career ==
Born in Philadelphia and raised in Camden, New Jersey, Mitchell graduated from Woodrow Wilson High School in Camden. Because he could not afford college, Mitchell worked factory and service jobs before attending Gloucester County College. Mitchell played on the Gloucester basketball team while also working the night shift as a computer operator at a bank.

Mitchell then attended Rutgers University–Camden for a year, before embarking on a business career. He worked as a shoe company manager and printing sales representative. In Glassboro, New Jersey, Mitchell founded a clothing store, Mr. Fang's Athletic Attire, which expanded from one to three locations.

== Coaching career ==
=== Gloucester County College ===
With no coaching experience, Mitchell became head coach at Gloucester County College in 1978. In his first season, he led the previously struggling Gloucester County Roadrunners to a stunning 19–11 record, then to consecutive seasons with 26 or more wins per year until the 1985–86 season. Gloucester County also made the NJCAA tournament in 1980, 1981, 1985, and 1986.

While Gloucester County head coach, Mitchell also assisted at Temple University basketball camps and became a good friend of Temple coach John Chaney. Additionally, Mitchell completed his Bachelor of Business Administration degree at Thomas Edison State College in 1984.

=== Coppin State ===
In 1986, Coppin State University, a member of the Mid-Eastern Athletic Conference (MEAC), hired Mitchell to be head coach for the Coppin State Eagles men's basketball team; Mitchell would hold this position for 28 seasons. Mitchell earned his master's degree in adult and continuing education at Coppin State in 1994 while head coach. In his 28 seasons as head coach, Mitchell was named MEAC Coach of the Year six times. He also led Coppin State to first place in the MEAC regular season standings ten times and four NCAA tournament appearances.

The Coppin State Eagles improved annually from 8–19 in Mitchell's first season to 26–7 in the 1989–90 season and a berth in the 1990 NCAA tournament. The season also included an upset over Maryland. After being projected to finish seventh in the conference in coaches' and sports information directors' preseason polls, Coppin State finished the season 22–8 and first in the MEAC and also made the 1993 NCAA tournament. In 1995, Mitchell turned down an offer to be head coach at FIU with a salary of $150,000, 90 percent higher than his current pay at Coppin State.

Coppin State next made the NCAA Tournament in 1997 as a #15 seed and upset #2 South Carolina in the first round before losing to Texas in the second round 82–81. Coppin State's last NCAA Tournament berth under Mitchell was in 2008.

On March 28, 2014, Coppin State opted not to renew Mitchell's contract, following three consecutive losing seasons and nine losing seasons in the last ten.

== Personal life ==
Mitchell married the former Yvonne Forston in 1990; they remained married until her death in 2002.

== Head coaching record ==
=== Junior college ===
Record table
Season	Team	Overall	Conference	Standing	Postseason
Gloucester County Roadrunners (Garden State Athletic Conference) (1978–1986)
1978–79	Gloucester County	19–11			
1979–80	Gloucester County	31–4			NJCAA tournament
1980–81	Gloucester County	32–5			NJCAA Tournament
1981–82	Gloucester County	26–7			
1982–83	Gloucester County	28–5			
1983–84	Gloucester County	29–5			
1984–85	Gloucester County	30–4			NJCAA Tournament
1985–86	Gloucester County	32–5			NJCAA Tournament
Gloucester County:		227–46			
Total:		227–46			
National champion Postseason invitational champion Conference regular season champion Conference regular season and conference tournament champion Division regular season champion Division regular season and conference tournament champion Conference tournament champion

=== College ===
Record table
Season	Team	Overall	Conference	Standing	Postseason
Coppin State Eagles (Mid-Eastern Athletic Conference) (1986–2014)
1986–87	Coppin State	8–19	7–6	4th	
1987–88	Coppin State	13–14	8–7	5th	
1988–89	Coppin State	18–11	11–5	3rd	
1989–90	Coppin State	26–7	15–1	1st	NCAA Division I First Round
1990–91	Coppin State	19–11	14–2	1st	NIT First Round
1991–92	Coppin State	15–13	9–7	T–4th	
1992–93	Coppin State	22–8	16–0	1st	NCAA Division I First Round
1993–94	Coppin State	22–8	16–0	1st	
1994–95	Coppin State	21–10	15–1	1st	NIT Second Round
1995–96	Coppin State	19–10	14–2	T–1st	
1996–97	Coppin State	22–9	15–3	1st	NCAA Division I Second Round
1997–98	Coppin State	21–8	17–1	1st	
1998–99	Coppin State	15–14	14–4	T–1st	
1999–00	Coppin State	15–15	13–5	T–2nd	
2000–01	Coppin State	13–15	11–8	5th	
2001–02	Coppin State	6–25	3–15	10th	
2002–03	Coppin State	11–17	11–7	T–4th	
2003–04	Coppin State	18–14	14–4	T–1st	
2004–05	Coppin State	14–15	13–5	T–2nd	
2005–06	Coppin State	12–18	12–6	2nd	
2006–07	Coppin State	12–20	9–9	8th	
2007–08	Coppin State	16–21	7–9	T–7th	NCAA Division I Opening Round
2008–09	Coppin State	13–19	9–7	T–3rd	
2009–10	Coppin State	8–22	3–13	11th	
2010–11	Coppin State	16–14	11–5	T–2nd	
2011–12	Coppin State	14–16	9–7	6th	
2012–13	Coppin State	8–24	5–11	T–9th	
2013–14	Coppin State	12–20	7–9	7th	
Coppin State:		429–417	308–159		
Total:		429–417			
National champion Postseason invitational champion Conference regular season champion Conference regular season and conference tournament champion Division regular season champion Division regular season and conference tournament champion Conference tournament champion
