= Joe Pace (basketball) =

American basketball player (born 1953)

Personal information
- Born: December 18, 1953 (age 72) New Brunswick, New Jersey, U.S.
- Listed height: 6 ft 10 in (2.08 m)
- Listed weight: 220 lb (100 kg)

Career information
- High school: Franklin (Somerset, New Jersey)
- College: Maryland Eastern Shore (1972–1974); Coppin State (1974–1976)
- NBA draft: 1976: 2nd round, 31st overall pick
- Drafted by: Washington Bullets
- Playing career: 1976–1981
- Position: Center
- Number: 44

Career history
- 1976–1978: Washington Bullets
- 1978–1979: Baltimore Metros
- 1979–1981: Scavolini Pesaro

Career highlights
- NBA champion (1978); NAIA tournament MVP (1976)
- Stats at NBA.com
- Stats at Basketball Reference

Joseph Pace (born December 18, 1953) is an American former professional basketball player. He played in the National Basketball Association (NBA) for the Washington Bullets and in Italy for Scavolini Pesaro.

== College career ==
Pace played college basketball at Maryland Eastern Shore and Coppin State.

== Professional career ==
Pace won a league championship with the Washington Bullets in 1977–78.

On August 8, 1978, he signed as a free agent with the Boston Celtics, but walked out of pre-season training camp and was subsequently placed on waivers. In October 1978, he signed with the Baltimore Metros of the Continental Basketball Association. He appeared in 12 games for Baltimore and averaged 17.6 points per game, 2.4 blocks and 8.4 rebounds in 30.8 minutes. Pace played in the Italian top league for Scavolini Pesaro in 1979–1981.

== Personal life ==
In May 2008, he resided at a homeless shelter in Seattle. Shortly after the Seattle Post-Intelligencer documented his troubles, he received an outpouring of support from within the NBA community, and subsequently found a home.

== Career statistics ==
Legend
GP	Games played	GS	Games started	MPG	Minutes per game
FG%	Field goal percentage	3P%	3-point field goal percentage	FT%	Free throw percentage
RPG	Rebounds per game	APG	Assists per game	SPG	Steals per game
BPG	Blocks per game	PPG	Points per game	**Bold**	Career high
†	Won an NBA championship

=== NBA ===
==== Regular season ====
Year	Team	GP	MPG	FG%	FT%	RPG	APG	SPG	BPG	PPG
1976–77	Washington	30	4.0	.436	.552	1.1	.1	.1	**.6**	2.1
1977–78†	Washington	**49**	**8.9**	**.479**	**.613**	**2.7**	**.5**	**.2**	.4	**3.9**
Career		79	7.1	.467	.598	2.1	.3	.2	.5	3.2

==== Playoffs ====
Year	Team	GP	MPG	FG%	FT%	RPG	APG	SPG	BPG	PPG
1978†	Washington	9	5.8	.700	.733	2.2	.1	.1	.7	2.8
