= Antoine Brockington =

American basketball player (born 1974)

Personal information
- Born: April 8, 1974 (age 52) Philadelphia, Pennsylvania, U.S.
- Listed height: 6 ft 2 in (1.88 m)
- Listed weight: 190 lb (86 kg)

Career information
- High school: Northeast (Philadelphia, Pennsylvania)
- College: Coppin State (1995–1998)
- NBA draft: 1998: undrafted
- Playing career: 1999–2012
- Position: Point guard

Career history

Playing
- 1999: Haukar
- 1999: Panteras de Miranda
- 1999: Washington Congressionals
- 1999–2000: AEK Nicosia
- 2000–2001: Harrisburg Horizon
- 2001: Atlantic City Seagulls
- 2002: Delaware Express
- 2002: Zorros Morelia
- 2002–2003: Delaware Express
- 2004–2005: Philadelphia Fusion
- 2010–2011: South Jersey Enterprise
- 2011–2012: Palmieri Jeans Destroyers
- 2012: Carolina Gladiators

Coaching
- 2009–2010: Delaware Valley Charter School

Career highlights
- MEAC Player of the Year (1998); First-team All-MEAC (1998)

Antoine Brockington (born April 8, 1974) is an American former professional basketball player. He played college basketball at Coppin State.

Brockington is the son of Ike Cahoe and Carolyn Spelling and grew up in Philadelphia. He played basketball at Northeast High School. As a junior, Brockington averaged 28.5 points per game and earned Philadelphia city Player of the Year honors. He broke his left wrist during a recreation league game on September 12, 1993, forcing him to miss most of his senior season. While playing in the Sonny Hill League, Brockington was noticed by former Coppin State assistant Nate Blackwell, who recommended him to coach Fang Mitchell. Mitchell offered Brockington a scholarship, which he accepted.

Brockington was ineligible during his freshman season due to not meeting academic requirements. He contemplated leaving Coppin State to find work in Philadelphia, but ultimately remained at the college. In his junior season, Brockington led the Eagles to the NCAA Tournament. In one of the biggest upsets in tournament history, 15th seeded Coppin State defeated second-seeded South Carolina 78–65 behind 20 points from Brockington. He averaged 17 points per game as a junior. As a senior, Brockington averaged 20.3 points per game and was named MEAC Player of the Year.

In January 1999, Brockington signed his first professional contract with Haukar in Iceland. He joined Panteras de Miranda for a tournament later in the year. In April 1999, he tried out for the Pennsylvania ValleyDawgs of the United States Basketball League. On June 8, Brockington signed with the Washington Congressionals of the USBL. In December 2000, he joined the Harrisburg Horizon of the United Basketball Alliance. Brockington served as head coach of Delaware Valley Charter School during the 2009–10 season.

Brockington's first son Antoine was born in 1994. His son Izaiah plays college basketball at Iowa State after transferring from Penn State.
