= Coppin Center =

Multi-purpose arena in Baltimore, Maryland

Coordinates: 39°18′40″N 76°39′28″W

Coppin Center was a 2,000-seat multi-purpose arena in Baltimore, Maryland. It was the home of the Coppin State University Eagles basketball team and the Baltimore Pearls of the American Basketball Association. The venue was demolished in 2011. It was replaced at Coppin State by the Physical Education Complex.
