= 1996–97 Indiana Hoosiers men's basketball team =

American college basketball season

1996–97 Indiana Hoosiers men's basketball

NCAA tournament, Round of 64
- Conference: Big Ten Conference
- Record: 22–11 (9–9 Big Ten)
- Head coach: Bobby Knight (26th season)
- Home arena: Assembly Hall

1996–97 Big Ten Conference men's basketball standings
| | Conf. | | | | Overall |
| Team | W | | L | PCT | W | | L | PCT |
|---|---|---|---|---|---|---|---|---|
| Iowa | 12 | – | 6 | .667 | 22 | – | 10 | .688 |
| Purdue | 12 | – | 6 | .667 | 18 | – | 12 | .600 |
| No. 19 Illinois | 11 | – | 7 | .611 | 22 | – | 10 | .688 |
| Wisconsin | 11 | – | 7 | .611 | 18 | – | 10 | .643 |
| Indiana | 9 | – | 9 | .500 | 22 | – | 11 | .667 |
| Michigan State | 9 | – | 9 | .500 | 17 | – | 12 | .586 |
| Ohio State | 5 | – | 13 | .278 | 10 | – | 17 | .370 |
| Penn State | 3 | – | 15 | .167 | 10 | – | 17 | .370 |
| Northwestern | 2 | – | 16 | .111 | 7 | – | 22 | .241 |
| No. 3 Minnesota* | 0 | – | 2 | .000 | 0 | – | 4 | .000 |
| Michigan* | 0 | – | 9 | .000 | 0 | – | 11 | .000 |
Rankings from AP Poll; *Michigan: 24 games vacated; including NIT champ. vacated due to sanctions against the program *Minnesota: 5 NCAA Tournament games vacated due to sanctions against the program Disputed records: Michigan-(24–11)(9–9); Minnesota-(31–4)(16–2)

The 1996–97 Indiana Hoosiers men's basketball team represented Indiana University. Their head coach was Bobby Knight, who was in his 26th year. The team played its home games in Assembly Hall in Bloomington, Indiana, and was a member of the Big Ten Conference. The Hoosiers finished the regular season with an overall record of 22–11 and a conference record of 9–9, finishing in a tie for sixth in the Big Ten. The Hoosiers received an at-large bid to the NCAA tournament as a No. 8 seed. However, IU made a quick exit with a loss in the first round to Colorado.

== Roster ==
| No. | Name | Position | Ht. | Year | Hometown |
|---|---|---|---|---|---|
| 3 | Charlie Miller | F | 6–7 | Jr. | Miami, Florida |
| 5 | Neil Reed | G | 6–2 | Jr. | Metairie, Louisiana |
| 12 | Luke Jimenez | G | 6–3 | Fr. | Redwood Falls, Minnesota |
| 21 | Richard Mandeville | C | 7–1 | Jr. | Pasadena, California |
| 23 | Jean Paul | G | 6–2 | Jr. | Naples, Florida |
| 24 | Michael Lewis | G | 6–1 | Fr. | Jasper, Indiana |
| 25 | A.J. Guyton | G | 6–1 | Fr. | Peoria, Illinois |
| 32 | Robbie Eggers | F | 6–10 | Jr. | Cuyahoga Falls, Ohio |
| 33 | Larry Richardson | G | 6–8 | Fr. | Orange Park, Florida |
| 40 | Jason Collier | C | 7–1 | Fr. | Springfield, Ohio |
| 45 | Andrae Patterson | F | 6–8 | Jr. | Abilene, Texas |
| 55 | Haris Mujezinovic | C | 6–9 | Sr. | Chicago, Illinois |

== Schedule and results ==
| Date time, TV | Rank^{#} | Opponent^{#} | Result | Record | Site city, state |
Non-conference regular season
| 11/15/1996* | | vs. Connecticut | W 68–61 | 1–0 | RCA Dome; Indianapolis, IN |
| 11/20/1996* | No. 22 | Princeton | W 59–49 | 2–0 | Assembly Hall; Bloomington, IN |
| 11/22/1996* | No. 22 | Saint Louis | W 70–54 | 3–0 | Assembly Hall; Bloomington, IN |
| 11/27/1996* | No. 20 | vs. Evansville; Preseason NIT Semifinals | W 74–73 | 4–0 | Madison Square Garden; New York City, NY |
| 11/29/1996* | No. 20 | vs. Duke; Preseason NIT Championship | W 85–69 | 5–0 | Madison Square Garden; New York City, NY |
| 12/2/1996* | No. 20 | at Notre Dame | W 76–75 | 6–0 | Joyce Center; Notre Dame, IN |
| 12/7/1996* | No. 8 | vs. No. 6 Kentucky; Indiana–Kentucky rivalry | L 65–99 | 6–1 | Freedom Hall; Louisville, KY |
| 12/10/1996* | No. 12 | vs. DePaul | W 74–57 | 7–1 | United Center; Chicago, IL |
| 12/13/1996* | No. 12 | Louisiana Tech; Indiana Classic | W 73–44 | 8–1 | Assembly Hall; Bloomington, IN |
| 12/14/1996* | No. 12 | Santa Clara; Indiana Classic | W 86–74 | 9–1 | Assembly Hall; Bloomington, IN |
| 12/21/1996* | No. 13 | vs. Evansville | W 75–57 | 10–1 | RCA Dome; Indianapolis, IN |
| 12/23/1996* | No. 13 | Butler | W 89–84 | 11–1 | Assembly Hall; Bloomington, IN |
| 12/27/1996* | No. 13 | vs. Colgate; Union Federal Hoosier Classic | W 63–48 | 12–1 | Market Square Arena; Indianapolis, IN |
| 12/28/1996* | No. 13 | vs. Valparaiso; Union Federal Hoosier Classic | W 72–51 | 13–1 | Market Square Arena; Indianapolis, IN |
Big Ten regular season
| 1/2/1997 | No. 12 | Michigan State | W 77–65 | 14–1 (1–0) | Assembly Hall; Bloomington, IN |
| 1/4/1997 | No. 12 | at Wisconsin | L 58–71 | 14–2 (1–1) | Wisconsin Field House; Madison, WI |
| 1/8/1997 | No. 15 | No. 11 Minnesota | L 91–96 | 14–3 (1–2) | Assembly Hall; Bloomington, IN |
| 1/15/1997 | No. 17 | at Northwestern | W 66–63 | 15–3 (2–2) | Welsh-Ryan Arena; Evanston, IL |
| 1/18/1997 | No. 17 | at Purdue; Rivalry | L 53–70 | 15–4 (2–3) | Mackey Arena; West Lafayette, IN |
| 1/21/1997 | No. 21 | No. 16 Michigan | W 72–70 | 16–4 (3–3) | Assembly Hall; Bloomington, IN |
| 1/26/1997 | No. 21 | at Penn State | W 70–55 | 17–4 (4–3) | Bryce Jordan Center; University Park, PA |
| 1/30/1997 | No. 17 | at Ohio State | L 67–73 | 17–5 (4–4) | St. John Arena; Columbus, OH |
| 2/2/1997 | No. 17 | Illinois; Rivalry | L 74–78 | 17–6 (4–5) | Assembly Hall; Bloomington, IN |
| 2/4/1997 | No. 24 | at Iowa | L 67–75 | 17–7 (4–6) | Carver-Hawkeye Arena; Iowa City, IA |
| 2/8/1997 | No. 24 | Ohio State | W 93–76 | 18–7 (5–6) | Assembly Hall; Bloomington, IN |
| 2/11/1997 | | Penn State | W 81–57 | 19–7 (6–6) | Assembly Hall; Bloomington, IN |
| 2/16/1997 | | at No. 18 Michigan | W 84–81 | 20–7 (7–6) | Crisler Arena; Ann Arbor, MI |
| 2/18/1997 | No. 24 | Purdue; Rivalry | L 87–89 | 20–8 (7–7) | Assembly Hall; Bloomington, IN |
| 2/22/1997 | No. 24 | Northwestern | W 64–49 | 21–8 (8–7) | Assembly Hall; Bloomington, IN |
| 3/1/1997 | No. 22 | at Minnesota | L 72–75 | 21–9 (8–8) | Williams Arena; Minneapolis, MN |
| 3/5/1997 | No. 25 | Wisconsin | W 70–66 | 22–9 (9–8) | Assembly Hall; Bloomington, IN |
| 3/8/1997 | No. 25 | at Michigan State | L 60–63 | 22–10 (9–9) | Breslin Center; East Lansing |
NCAA tournament
| 3/13/1997* | (8 E) | vs. (9 E) No. 24 Colorado; First Round | L 62–80 | 22–11 | LJV Coliseum; Winston-Salem, NC |
*Non-conference game. ^{#}Rankings from AP Poll. (#) Tournament seedings in parentheses. E=East.
