= 1996–97 Purdue Boilermakers men's basketball team =

American college basketball season

1996–97 Purdue Boilermakers men's basketball

NCAA tournament, Second round
- Conference: Big Ten Conference
- Record: 18–12 (12–6 Big Ten)
- Head coach: Gene Keady
- Home arena: Mackey Arena

1996–97 Big Ten Conference men's basketball standings
	Conf.				Overall
Team	W		L	PCT	W		L	PCT
Iowa	12	–	6	.667	22	–	10	.688
Purdue	12	–	6	.667	18	–	12	.600
No. 19 Illinois	11	–	7	.611	22	–	10	.688
Wisconsin	11	–	7	.611	18	–	10	.643
Indiana	9	–	9	.500	22	–	11	.667
Michigan State	9	–	9	.500	17	–	12	.586
Ohio State	5	–	13	.278	10	–	17	.370
Penn State	3	–	15	.167	10	–	17	.370
Northwestern	2	–	16	.111	7	–	22	.241
No. 3 Minnesota*	0	–	2	.000	0	–	4	.000
Michigan*	0	–	9	.000	0	–	11	.000
Rankings from AP Poll; *Michigan: 24 games vacated; including NIT champ. vacated due to sanctions against the program *Minnesota: 5 NCAA Tournament games vacated due to sanctions against the program Disputed records: Michigan-(24–11)(9–9); Minnesota-(31–4)(16–2)

The 1996–97 Purdue Boilermakers men's basketball team represented Purdue University as a member of the Big Ten Conference during the 1996–97 NCAA Division I men's basketball season. The team was led by Gene Keady and played its home games at Mackey Arena.

== Roster ==
1996–97 Purdue Boilermakers men's basketball team
Players
Coaches

Pos.	#	Name	Height	Weight	Year	Previous school	Hometown
G	3	Chad Austin	6 ft 2 in (1.88 m)	190 lb (86 kg)	Jr		Richmond, Indiana
C	14	Matt ten Dam	7 ft 2 in (2.18 m)	285 lb (129 kg)	Jr		Almelo, Holland
G	15	Alan Eldridge	6 ft 1 in (1.85 m)	195 lb (88 kg)	So		Fort Wayne, Indiana
G	22	Jaraan Cornell	6 ft 3 in (1.91 m)	200 lb (91 kg)	Fr	Clay	South Bend, Indiana
F	31	David Lesmond	6 ft 8 in (2.03 m)	205 lb (93 kg)	Jr		Pierrefitte, France
C	34	Luther Clay	6 ft 9 in (2.06 m)	210 lb (95 kg)	So		Oberlin, Ohio
F	35	Brian Cardinal	6 ft 8 in (2.03 m)	240 lb (109 kg)	Fr	Unity	Tolono, Illinois
F	52	Brad Miller	6 ft 11 in (2.11 m)	235 lb (107 kg)	Jr	East Noble	Kendallville, Indiana

Head coach

- Gene Keady (Kansas State)

Assistant coach(es)

- Bruce Weber (Milwaukee)
- Jay Price

Legend

- (C) Team captain
- (S) Suspended
- (I) Ineligible
- (W) Walk-on
- Injured
- Current redshirt

== Schedule and results ==
Date time, TV	Rank^{#}	Opponent^{#}	Result	Record	Site city, state
Regular Season
Nov 24, 1996*		Idaho	W 86–63	1–0	Mackey Arena; West Lafayette, Indiana
Nov 26, 1996*		at Western Michigan	W 65–56	2–0	University Arena; Kalamazoo, Michigan
Nov 30, 1996*		Bowling Green State	L 83–86	2–1	Mackey Arena; West Lafayette, Indiana
Dec 3, 1996*		vs. No. 6 Kentucky; Great Eight	L 87–101	2–2	United Center (20,171); Chicago, Illinois
Dec 6, 1996*		Cornell	W 69–55	3–2	Mackey Arena; West Lafayette, Indiana
Dec 7, 1996*		Long Beach State	W 86–71	4–2	Mackey Arena; West Lafayette, Indiana
Dec 14, 1996*		vs. No. 22 Louisville	L 72–88	4–3	Market Square Arena; Indianapolis, Indiana
Dec 16, 1996*		Tennessee-Martin	W 75–45	5–3	Mackey Arena; West Lafayette, Indiana
Dec 21, 1996*		at Oklahoma	L 58–82	5–4	Lloyd Noble Center; Norman, Oklahoma
Dec 30, 1996*		at TCU	L 69–97	5–5	Daniel-Meyer Coliseum; Fort Worth, Texas
Jan 2, 1997		at No. 24 Illinois	W 75–69	6–5 (1–0)	Assembly Hall; Champaign, Illinois
Jan 7, 1997		Iowa	L 56–59	6–6 (1–1)	Mackey Arena; West Lafayette, Indiana
Jan 11, 1997		Northwestern	W 78–53	7–6 (2–1)	Mackey Arena; West Lafayette, Indiana
Jan 16, 1997		at No. 18 Michigan	L 65–89	7–7 (2–2)	Crisler Arena; Ann Arbor, Michigan
Jan 18, 1997		No. 17 Indiana	W 70–53	8–7 (3–2)	Mackey Arena; West Lafayette, Indiana
Jan 22, 1997		Wisconsin	W 60–52	9–7 (4–2)	Mackey Arena; West Lafayette, Indiana
Jan 25, 1997		at No. 8 Minnesota	L 68–91	9–8 (4–3)	Williams Arena; Minneapolis, Minnesota
Jan 29, 1997		Michigan State	W 72–62	10–8 (5–3)	Mackey Arena; West Lafayette, Indiana
Feb 1, 1997		at Penn State	W 67–62	11–8 (6–3)	Bryce Jordan Center; University Park, Pennsylvania
Feb 5, 1997		Ohio State	W 94–77	12–8 (7–3)	Mackey Arena; West Lafayette, Indiana
Feb 8, 1997		at Michigan State	W 77–62	13–8 (8–3)	Breslin Student Events Center; East Lansing, Michigan
Feb 12, 1997		No. 3 Minnesota	L 67–70	13–9 (8–4)	Mackey Arena; West Lafayette, Indiana
Feb 15, 1997		at Wisconsin	L 52–69	13–10 (8–5)	Wisconsin Field House; Madison, Wisconsin
Feb 18, 1997		at No. 24 Indiana	W 89–87 ^{OT}	14–10 (9–5)	Assembly Hall; Bloomington, Indiana
Feb 23, 1997*		No. 18 Michigan	W 67–58	15–10 (10–5)	Mackey Arena; West Lafayette, Indiana
Feb 26, 1997		at Northwestern	W 72–61	16–10 (11–5)	Welsh-Ryan Arena; Evanston, Illinois
Mar 1, 1997		at Iowa	L 62–84	16–11 (11–6)	Carver-Hawkeye Arena; Iowa City, Iowa
Mar 8, 1997		No. 15 Illinois	W 77–69	17–11 (12–6)	Mackey Arena; West Lafayette, Indiana
NCAA Tournament
Mar 13, 1997*	(8 SE)	vs. (9 SE) Rhode Island; First round	W 83–76 ^{OT}	18–11	The Pyramid; Memphis, Tennessee
Mar 15, 1997*	(8 SE)	vs. (1 SE) No. 1 Kansas; Second round	L 61–75	18–12	The Pyramid; Memphis, Tennessee
*Non-conference game. ^{#}Rankings from AP Poll. (#) Tournament seedings in parentheses. SE=Southeast.
