= 1996–97 Wisconsin Badgers men's basketball team =

American college basketball season

1996–97 Wisconsin Badgers men's basketball

NCAA Tournament First Round
- Conference: Big Ten Conference
- Record: 18-10 (11-7 Big Ten)
- Head coach: Dick Bennett (2nd season)
- Assistant coaches: Brad Soderberg; Shawn Hood; Brian Hecker
- Home arena: UW Field House (capacity: 11,500)

1996–97 Big Ten Conference men's basketball standings
	Conf.				Overall
Team	W		L	PCT	W		L	PCT
Iowa	12	–	6	.667	22	–	10	.688
Purdue	12	–	6	.667	18	–	12	.600
No. 19 Illinois	11	–	7	.611	22	–	10	.688
Wisconsin	11	–	7	.611	18	–	10	.643
Indiana	9	–	9	.500	22	–	11	.667
Michigan State	9	–	9	.500	17	–	12	.586
Ohio State	5	–	13	.278	10	–	17	.370
Penn State	3	–	15	.167	10	–	17	.370
Northwestern	2	–	16	.111	7	–	22	.241
No. 3 Minnesota*	0	–	2	.000	0	–	4	.000
Michigan*	0	–	9	.000	0	–	11	.000
Rankings from AP Poll; *Michigan: 24 games vacated; including NIT champ. vacated due to sanctions against the program *Minnesota: 5 NCAA Tournament games vacated due to sanctions against the program Disputed records: Michigan-(24–11)(9–9); Minnesota-(31–4)(16–2)

The 1996–97 Wisconsin Badgers men's basketball team represented the University of Wisconsin–Madison as a member of the Big Ten Conference during the 1996-97 NCAA Division I men's basketball season. Head coach Dick Bennett completed his second season coaching with the Badgers. The team played its home games in Madison, Wisconsin at the UW Field House. Wisconsin finished the season 18–10, 11–7 in Big Ten play to finish tied for fourth place. The Badgers received an at-large bid to the NCAA tournament as a No. 7 seed in the East Region, where they were defeated in the first round by No. 10 seed Texas.

== Season summary ==
Wisconsin won 18 regular season games for only the second time in school history and recorded a winning Big Ten record for the first time since 1974. The Badgers finished as the Big Ten's top defensive squad, surrendering only 55.3 points-per-game over the entire season and 56.8 points-per-game on 39.7 percent shooting during conference play. They overcame the absence of two promising wing players with a strong frontcourt featuring lone senior Paul Grant, a 7-foot transfer from Boston College, at center. Grant led the team in scoring (12.5 ppg), while leading rebounder Sam Okey (8.5 rpg) and junior Sean Daugherty manned the forward spots as the second and third leading scorers, respectively.

A highlight of a 6–0 start was when junior guard Sean Mason scored all 18 of his points in the second half and overtime to win at Temple, 64–57. The Badgers dropped two contests when Okey and guard Ty Calderwood took turns missing one game apiece, but the team's first loss at full strength came on the road to No. 15 Minnesota in the 10th game of the season. Wisconsin responded two nights later by using a 17–0 opening run to topple No. 12 Indiana, 71–58, to snap a 31-game losing streak to the Hoosiers.

Calderwood made a pair of memorable game-winning plays during his junior year. On February 26, 1997, he hit a three-pointer with seven seconds remaining to beat Iowa, 49–48, to extend Wisconsin's Big Ten winning streak to six games. In the regular season finale, Calderwood sank two free throws and then poked the ball away on the following defensive possession to upset No. 2 Minnesota, 66–65.

Wisconsin earned a No. 7 seed in the NCAA Tournament, only its second bid in 56 years, but the Badgers lost to No. 10 seed Texas, 71–58, in a first-round game in Pittsburgh.

=== Notable injuries ===
Mason was Wisconsin's leading scorer (12.3 ppg) through three games when he went down with a season-ending ACL injury to his left knee in the opening minutes against Brown on December 7, 1996. He then redshirted. It was the second straight year Mason's season ended early due to an ACL injury.

Still recovering from the severely dislocated left knee cap he suffered in Wisconsin's first round NIT game the previous season, junior Mosezell Peterson sat the entire year as a medical redshirt. Peterson never suited up for the Badgers again as a result of the foot drop he developed, accepting a student assistant role the following season.

== Awards ==
All-Big Ten

- Sam Okey - 2nd team (media) and 3rd team (coaches)
- Paul Grant - Honorable mention (media and coaches)

Big Ten Player of the Week

- Sam Okey - Week of December 16

== Roster ==
1996–97 Wisconsin Badgers men's basketball team
Players
Coaches
*Earned 1-year scholarship for '96-97

Pos.	#	Name	Height	Weight	Year	Hometown
G/F	3	Duany Duany	6 ft 4 in (1.93 m)	190 lb (86 kg)	RS Fr	Bloomington, IN
F	4	Sam Okey	6 ft 7 in (2.01 m)	240 lb (109 kg)	So	Cassville, WI
G	5	Hennssy Auriantal	6 ft 1 in (1.85 m)	190 lb (86 kg)	So	Montreal
G	12	Ty Calderwood	6 ft 0 in (1.83 m)	175 lb (79 kg)	Jr	Joliet, IL
G/F	13	Mosezell Peterson (injured) (redshirt)	6 ft 4 in (1.93 m)	200 lb (91 kg)	Jr	Louisville, KY
G	22	Sean Mason (injured) (redshirt)	6 ft 2 in (1.88 m)	175 lb (79 kg)	Jr	Country Club Hills, IL
G	23	Mike Kosolcharoen (*)	6 ft 1 in (1.85 m)	195 lb (88 kg)	So	Adams, WI
G	25	David Burkemper (*)	6 ft 1 in (1.85 m)	205 lb (93 kg)	Jr	Hubertus, WI
G/F	32	Adam Shafer (*)	6 ft 4 in (1.93 m)	180 lb (82 kg)	Jr	Downers Grove, IL
F	33	Brian Vraney (*)	6 ft 6 in (1.98 m)	240 lb (109 kg)	Jr	Valders, WI
C	40	Paul Grant (C)	7 ft 0 in (2.13 m)	245 lb (111 kg)	Sr	West Bloomfield, MI
F/C	41	Booker Coleman	6 ft 9 in (2.06 m)	230 lb (104 kg)	Jr	Jamestown, NY
F	42	Matt Quest (W)	6 ft 6 in (1.98 m)	220 lb (100 kg)	RS So	Watertown, WI
F/C	52	Sean Daugherty	6 ft 10 in (2.08 m)	230 lb (104 kg)	Jr	Vincennes, IN
G		Troy Schuhmacher (W)	6 ft 3 in (1.91 m)	—	Fr	Sun Prairie, WI
G		Matt Meiners (W)	6 ft 0 in (1.83 m)	—	Fr	Hyattsville, MD

Head coach

- Dick Bennett (Ripon)

Assistant coach(es)

- Brad Soderberg (Ripon)
- Shawn Hood
- Brian Hecker

Legend

- (C) Team captain
- (S) Suspended
- (I) Ineligible
- (W) Walk-on
- Injured
- Current redshirt

Roster
Last update: 2019-08-05

*awarded one-year scholarship prior to season

== Schedule ==
Date time, TV	Opponent	Result	Record	High points	High rebounds	High assists	Site (attendance) city, state
Regular Season
11/23/1996*	vs. Memphis; Capital City Shootout	W 49-46	1-0	20 – Grant	10 – Daugherty	3 – Calderwood, Okey	Corel Centre (7,000); Ottawa, ON
11/30/1996*	UNC-Wilmington	W 68-35	2-0	13 – Mason	6 – Okey	6 – Calderwood	UW Field House (11,354); Madison, WI
12/4/1996*	at Temple	W 64-57 ^{OT}	3-0	18 – Mason	10 – Grant	7 – Calderwood	McGonigle Hall (3,427); Philadelphia, PA
12/7/1996*	Brown	W 52-30	4-0	13 – Auriental	7 – Auriental	3 – Calderwood, Okey	UW Field House (11,354); Madison, WI
12/10/1996*	UW-Milwaukee	W 61-41	5-0	30 – Okey	17 – Okey	8 – Calderwood	UW Field House (10,982); Madison, WI
12/14/1996*	at St. Bonaventure	W 77-68	6-0	16 – Grant	12 – Okey	6 – Calderwood	Reilly Center (5,953); Olean, NY
12/23/1996*	Providence	L 57-59	6-1	16 – Daugherty, Grant	9 – Grant	2 – Calderwood, Duany, Kosolcharoen	UW Field House (11,500); Madison, WI
12/26/1996*	Ball State	W 74-59	7-1	19 – Daugherty	8 – Daugherty	5 – Auriental, Okey	UW Field House (11,500); Madison, WI
12/31/1996*	at Marquette	L 52-59	7-2	14 – Duany	7 – Auriental	6 – Auriental	Bradley Center (15,292); Milwaukee, WI
1/2/1997	at No. 15 Minnesota	L 48-65	7-3 (0-1)	16 – Okey	10 – Daugherty	4 – Calderwood	Williams Arena (14,351); Minneapolis, MN
1/4/1997	No. 12 Indiana	W 71-58	8-3 (1-1)	13 – Daugherty, Grant, Okey	5 – Okey	6 – Calderwood	UW Field House (11,500); Madison, WI
1/9/1997; ESPN	Michigan State	L 50-58	8-4 (1-2)	15 – Grant	6 – Daugherty	2 – Okey	UW Field House (11,719); Madison, WI
1/11/1997	at Iowa	L 53-78	8-5 (1-3)	15 – Grant	11 – Okey	5 – Calderwood, Okey	Carver-Hawkeye Arena (15,500); Iowa City, IA
1/18/1997	Penn State	W 64-45	9-5 (2-3)	13 – Calderwood, Okey	7 – Daugherty	5 – Calderwood	UW Field House (11,715); Madison, WI
1/22/1997	at Purdue	L 52-60	9-6 (2-4)	14 – Calderwood	7 – Okey	5 – Okey	Mackey Arena (14,123); West Lafayette, IN
1/25/1997	at Illinois	W 73-56	10-6 (3-4)	20 – Duany	16 – Okey	5 – Calderwood	Assembly Hall (15,448); Champaign, IL
1/29/1997	Northwestern	W 65-53	11-6 (4-4)	17 – Okey	7 – Daugherty, Okey	3 – Calderwood	UW Field House (11,500); Madison, WI
2/1/1997	at Ohio State	L 42-60	11-7 (4-5)	16 – Daugherty	13 – Okey	2 – Calderwood, Okey	St. John Arena (10,001); Columbus, OH
2/6/1997	No. 13 Michigan	W 58-53	12-7 (5-5)	19 – Grant	11 – Daugherty	7 – Okey	UW Field House (11,500); Madison, WI
2/8/1997	at Northwestern	W 56-44	13-7 (6-5)	12 – Calderwood	12 – Okey	5 – Calderwood	Welsh-Ryan Arena (5,117); Evanston, IL
2/12/1997	No. 20 Illinois	W 62-45	14-7 (7-5	16 – Okey	11 – Daugherty	3 – Okey	UW Field House (11,500); Madison, WI
2/15/1997	Purdue	W 69-52	15-7 (8-5)	20 – Okey	9 – Daugherty	4 – Calderwood	UW Field House (11,500); Madison, WI
2/19/1997	at Penn State	W 49-45	16-7 (9-5)	11 – Grant	14 – Okey	3 – Okey	Bryce Jordan Center (13,205); University Park, PA
2/26/1997	Iowa	W 49-48	17-7 (10-5)	23 – Grant	10 – Grant	3 – Okey	UW Field House (11,500); Madison, WI
3/1/1997	at Michigan State	L 49-68	17-8 (10-6)	12 – Grant	6 – Okey	5 – Calderwood	Breslin Center (15,138); East Lansing, MI
3/5/1997	at No. 25 Indiana	L 66-70	17-9 (10-7)	16 – Grant	7 – Grant	5 – Calderwood	Assembly Hall (17,284); Bloomington, IN
3/8/1997	No. 2 Minnesota	W 66-65	18-9 (11-7)	19 – Calderwood	9 – Okey	3 – Auriental, Calderwood	UW Field House (11,500); Madison, WI
NCAA tournament
3/14/1997*	vs. (10) Texas; First Round - East Region	L 58-71	18-10	17 – Okey	10 – Okey	6 – Okey	Civic Arena (17,300); Pittsburgh, PA
*Non-conference game. (#) Tournament seedings in parentheses.

== Player statistics ==
Individual player statistics (Final)
			Minutes		Scoring		Total FGs			3-point FGs			Free Throws			Rebounds								
Player	GP	GS	Tot	Avg	Pts	Avg	FG	FGA	Pct	3FG	3FA	Pct	FT	FTA	Pct	Off	Def	Tot	Avg	A	TO	Blk	Stl	PF
Grant, Paul	28	26	765	27.3	350	12.5	129	261	.494	0	1	.000	92	129	.713			145	5.2	21	62	34	14	82
Okey, Sam	27	27	833	30.9	302	11.2	103	239	.431	16	48	.333	80	125	.640			230	8.5	77	63	24	32	90
Daugherty, Sean	28	21	795	28.4	270	9.6	104	235	.443	17	48	.354	45	65	.692			151	5.4	22	39	13	17	78
Mason, Sean	4	4	81	20.2	37	9.2	9	25	.360	3	9	.333	16	20	.800			11	2.8	5	9	2	5	7
Calderwood, Ty	27	24	886	32.8	238	8.8	71	202	.351	39	117	.333	57	72	.792			87	3.2	101	68	5	63	71
Duany, Duany	27	9	459	17.0	137	5.1	47	142	.331	28	86	.326	15	34	.441			39	1.4	11	29	1	6	31
Auriental, Hennssy	28	13	631	22.5	141	5.0	49	121	.405	20	49	.408	23	40	.575			75	2.7	42	45	2	25	72
Kosolcharoen, Mike	28	4	575	20.5	117	4.2	39	110	.355	12	37	.324	27	33	.818			45	1.6	24	55	2	16	66
Coleman, Booker	27	2	211	7.8	30	1.1	11	23	.478	0	0	.000	8	25	.320			37	1.4	2	15	13	3	24
Burkemper, David	24	10	300	12.5	16	0.7	4	15	.267	1	7	.143	7	8	.875			25	1.0	25	19	0	5	33
Shafer, Adam	7	0	23	3.3	4	0.6	0	4	.000	0	2	.000	4	8	.500			1	0.1	2	0	0	0	1
Vraney, Brian	11	0	24	2.2	6	0.5	2	8	.250	0	0	.000	2	2	1.000			6	0.5	0	0	0	1	3
Schuhmacher, Troy	6	0	15	2.5	3	0.5	1	3	.333	1	2	.500	0	2	.000			4	0.7	0	0	0	0	0
Meiners, Matt	4	0	5	1.2	2	0.5	1	1	1.000	0	0	.000	0	0	.000			2	0.5	0	0	0	0	2
Quest, Matt	10	0	22	2.2	1	0.1	0	2	.000	0	0	.000	1	6	.167			10	1.0	0	3	1	0	4
Total	28	-	5625	40.2	1654	59.1	570	1391	.410	137	406	.337	377	569	.663	320	631	951	34.0	332	422	97	187	564
Opponents	28	-	5625	40.2	1548	55.3	502	1329	.378	128	408	.314	416	612	.680	296	589	885	31.6	236	437	73	195	525

Legend
GP	Games played	GS	Games started	Avg	Average per game
FG	Field goals made	FGA	Field-goal attempts	Off	Offensive rebounds
Def	Defensive rebounds	A	Assists	TO	Turnovers
Blk	Blocks	Stl	Steals	High	Team high

== Records and trivia ==
Wisconsin went 5–2 against teams ranked in the AP Top 25.

Calderwood tallied 63 steals in 27 games to lead the Big Ten with a 2.33 steals-per-game average.

Prior to the season, Bennett awarded one-year scholarships to four walk-ons from the 1995-96 roster: juniors David Burkemper, Adam Schafer, Brian Vraney, and sophomore Mike Kosolcharoen. This brought the number of scholarship athletes on the 1996-97 roster to the allowed maximum of 13.
