= 1996–97 Iowa Hawkeyes men's basketball team =

American college basketball season

1996–97 Iowa Hawkeyes men's basketball

Super Chevy Shootout Champions

NCAA men's Division I tournament, Round of 32
- Conference: Big Ten Conference
- Record: 22–10 (12–6 Big Ten)
- Head coach: Tom Davis (11th season)
- Assistant coach: Gary Close
- MVP: Andre Woolridge
- Home arena: Carver-Hawkeye Arena (Capacity: 15,500)

1996–97 Big Ten Conference men's basketball standings
	Conf.				Overall
Team	W		L	PCT	W		L	PCT
Iowa	12	–	6	.667	22	–	10	.688
Purdue	12	–	6	.667	18	–	12	.600
No. 19 Illinois	11	–	7	.611	22	–	10	.688
Wisconsin	11	–	7	.611	18	–	10	.643
Indiana	9	–	9	.500	22	–	11	.667
Michigan State	9	–	9	.500	17	–	12	.586
Ohio State	5	–	13	.278	10	–	17	.370
Penn State	3	–	15	.167	10	–	17	.370
Northwestern	2	–	16	.111	7	–	22	.241
No. 3 Minnesota*	0	–	2	.000	0	–	4	.000
Michigan*	0	–	9	.000	0	–	11	.000
Rankings from AP Poll; *Michigan: 24 games vacated; including NIT champ. vacated due to sanctions against the program *Minnesota: 5 NCAA Tournament games vacated due to sanctions against the program Disputed records: Michigan-(24–11)(9–9); Minnesota-(31–4)(16–2)

The 1996–97 Iowa Hawkeyes men's basketball team represented the University of Iowa as members of the Big Ten Conference. The team was led by 11th year head coach Tom Davis, and played their home games at Carver-Hawkeye Arena. They finished the season 22–10 overall and 12–6 in Big Ten play. The Hawkeyes received an at-large bid to the NCAA tournament as #8 seed in the West Region, losing 75–69 in the Round of 32 to the eventual National Runner-Up Kentucky Wildcats.

== Roster ==
1996–97 Iowa Hawkeyes men's basketball team
Players
Coaches

Pos.	#	Name	Height	Weight	Year	Hometown
G	3	Jason Bauer	6 ft 3 in (1.91 m)	—	So	Hudson, Iowa
F	4	Jess Settles	6 ft 7 in (2.01 m)	—	Sr	Winfield, Iowa
PG	5	Andre Woolridge	6 ft 0 in (1.83 m)	—	Sr	Omaha, Nebraska
C	13	Guy Rucker	6 ft 11 in (2.11 m)	—	Fr	Inkster, Michigan
G	24	Ryan Luehrsmann	5 ft 11 in (1.8 m)	—	Fr	Cedar Rapids, Iowa
F	25	Vernon Simmons	6 ft 6 in (1.98 m)	—	Jr	Simi Valley, California
G	32	Kent McCausland	6 ft 3 in (1.91 m)	—	So	Waterloo, Iowa
PF	42	Ryan Bowen	6 ft 9 in (2.06 m)	—	Jr	Fort Madison, Iowa
F	44	J. R. Koch	6 ft 10 in (2.08 m)	—	So	Morton, Illinois
F	45	Darryl Moore	6 ft 2 in (1.88 m)	—	Jr	Chicago, Illinois

Head coach

- Tom Davis (UW–Platteville)

Assistant coach(es)

- Gary Close (Arizona State)

Legend

- (C) Team captain
- (S) Suspended
- (I) Ineligible
- (W) Walk-on
- Injured
- Current redshirt

== Schedule/Results ==
Date time, TV	Rank^{#}	Opponent^{#}	Result	Record	High points	High rebounds	High assists	Site (attendance) city, state
Regular Season
11/22/1996*	No. 25	vs. Western Illinois	W 81–66	1–0	24 – Woolridge	–	–	The MARK of the Quad Cities; Moline, IL
11/25/1996*; ESPN	No. 25	vs. California; Maui Invitational Tournament	L 59–75	1–1	–	–	–	Lahaina Civic Center; Maui, HI
11/26/1996*		vs. LSU; Maui Invitational Tournament	L 60–70	1–2	16 – Woolridge	9 – Moore, Rucker	5 – Woolridge	Lahaina Civic Center; Maui, HI
11/27/1996*		at Chaminade; Maui Invitational Tournament	W 67–37	2–2	22 – Koch	11 – Koch	5 – Moore	Lahaina Civic Center; Maui, HI
12/3/1996*		at Drake; Iowa Big Four	W 79–59	3–2	14 – Woolridge	13 – Moore	5 – Woolridge	Knapp Center; Des Moines, IA
12/6/1996*		Grambling; Super Chevy Shootout	W 93–73	4–2	20 – McCausland	–	–	Carver-Hawkeye Arena; Iowa City, IA
12/7/1996*		La Salle; Super Chevy Shootout	W 65–60	5–2	16 – Woolridge	18 – Bowen	4 – Moore, Woolridge	Carver-Hawkeye Arena; Iowa City, IA
12/10/1996*		Northern Iowa; Iowa Big Four	W 72–63	6–2	31 – Woolridge	10 – Bowen	7 – Woolridge	Carver-Hawkeye Arena (14,385); Iowa City, IA
12/14/1996*		No. 6 Iowa State; Rivalry	L 74–81	6–3	25 – Woolridge	8 – Bowen	5 – Woolridge	Carver-Hawkeye Arena (15,500); Iowa City, IA
12/21/1996*		Missouri	W 88–77	7–3	–	–	–	Carver-Hawkeye Arena; Iowa City, IA
12/27/1996*		Austin Peay	W 90–58	8–3	–	–	–	Carver-Hawkeye Arena; Iowa City, IA
12/29/1996*		Cal State Northridge	W 90–65	9–3	21 – Woolridge	14 – Bowen	–	Carver-Hawkeye Arena; Iowa City, IA
1/2/1997		Northwestern	W 72–55	10–3 (1–0)	28 – Woolridge	–	8 – Woolridge	Carver-Hawkeye Arena; Iowa City, IA
1/4/1997		at Penn State	W 69–57	11–3 (2–0)	17 – Bowen	8 – Koch	6 – Woolridge	Bryce Jordan Center; University Park, PA
1/7/1997		at Purdue	W 59–56	12–3 (3–0)	20 – Woolridge	10 – Bowen	–	Mackey Arena; West Lafayette, IN
1/11/1997		Wisconsin	W 78–53	13–3 (4–0)	21 – Woolridge	–	–	Carver-Hawkeye Arena; Iowa City, IA
1/15/1997		Ohio State	W 76–62	14–3 (5–0)	27 – Woolridge	–	–	Carver-Hawkeye Arena; Iowa City, IA
1/19/1997		at No. 18 Michigan	L 71–79	14–4 (5–1)	25 – Woolridge	10 – Rucker	4 – Woolridge	Crisler Arena (13,562); Ann Arbor, MI
1/23/1997		at No. 8 Minnesota	L 51–66	14–5 (5–2)	12 – Woolridge	8 – Koch	8 – Woolridge	Williams Arena (14,552); Minneapolis, MN
1/29/1997		Illinois	W 82–65	15–5 (6–2)	25 – Woolridge	–	9 – Woolridge	Carver-Hawkeye Arena; Iowa City, IA
2/4/1997	No. 25	No. 24 Indiana	W 75–67	16–5 (7–2)	18 – Woolridge	13 – Bowen	5 – Woolridge, McCausland	Carver-Hawkeye Arena; Iowa City, IA
2/9/1997	No. 25	at Illinois	L 51–66	16–6 (7–3)	16 – Rucker	9 – Bowen	5 – Bowen	Assembly Hall (16,450); Champaign, IL
2/12/1997		at Michigan State	L 67–69	16–7 (7–4)	18 – McCausland	9 – Bowen	8 – Woolridge	Breslin Student Events Center (13,003); East Lansing, MI
2/15/1997		No. 3 Minnesota	L 66–68	16–8 (7–5)	24 – Woolridge	–	–	Carver-Hawkeye Arena; Iowa City, IA
2/20/1997; 6:30 p.m., ESPN		No. 18 Michigan	W 80–75	17–8 (8–5)	25 – Woolridge	9 – Luehrsmann	8 – Woolridge	Carver-Hawkeye Arena; Iowa City, IA
2/22/1997		at Ohio State	W 69–56	18–8 (9–5)	17 – Bowen	6 – Bowen	7 – Woolridge	St. John Arena (12,323); Columbus, OH
2/26/1997		at Wisconsin	L 48–49	18–9 (9–6)	17 – Woolridge	9 – Moore	3 – Woolridge	Wisconsin Field House; Madison, WI
3/1/1997		Purdue	W 84–62	19–9 (10–6)	18 – Woolridge	–	8 – Woolridge	Carver-Hawkeye Arena; Iowa City, IA
3/5/1997		Penn State	W 81–55	20–9 (11–6)	26 – Woolridge	–	–	Carver-Hawkeye Arena (15,500); Iowa City, IA
3/8/1997		at Northwestern	W 75–59	21–9 (12–6)	34 – Woolridge	–	9 – Woolridge	Welsh-Ryan Arena; Evanston, IL
NCAA tournament
3/13/1997*	(8 W)	vs. (9 W) Virginia; West Regional 1st Round	W 73–60	22–9	19 – Rucker	16 – Bowen	10 – Woolridge	Huntsman Center (13,886); Salt Lake City, UT
3/15/1997*	(8 W)	vs. (1 W) No. 5 Kentucky; West Regional 2nd Round	L 69–75	22–10	29 – Woolridge	10 – Moore	5 – Woolridge	Huntsman Center (14,387); Salt Lake City, UT
*Non-conference game. ^{#}Rankings from AP Poll. (#) Tournament seedings in parentheses. W=West.

== Awards and honors ==
- Andre Woolridge – Third-Team AP All-American; First-Team All-Big Ten; First men's player in Big Ten history to lead the conference in scoring (20.2 ppg) and assists (6.0 apg) in same season
