= 1996–97 Minnesota Golden Gophers men's basketball team =

American college basketball season

1996–97 Minnesota Golden Gophers men's basketball

Big Ten Regular Season Champions (Vacated)

NCAA tournament, Final Four (Vacated)
- Conference: Big Ten Conference

Ranking
- Coaches: No. 3
- AP: No. 3
- Record: 0-4 (31–4 unadjusted) (0-2 (16–2 unadjusted) Big Ten)
- Head coach: Clem Haskins (11th season)
- Assistant coaches: Larry Davis; Bill Brown; Charles Cunningham
- MVP: Bobby Jackson
- Home arena: Williams Arena

1996–97 Big Ten Conference men's basketball standings
	Conf.				Overall
Team	W		L	PCT	W		L	PCT
Iowa	12	–	6	.667	22	–	10	.688
Purdue	12	–	6	.667	18	–	12	.600
No. 19 Illinois	11	–	7	.611	22	–	10	.688
Wisconsin	11	–	7	.611	18	–	10	.643
Indiana	9	–	9	.500	22	–	11	.667
Michigan State	9	–	9	.500	17	–	12	.586
Ohio State	5	–	13	.278	10	–	17	.370
Penn State	3	–	15	.167	10	–	17	.370
Northwestern	2	–	16	.111	7	–	22	.241
No. 3 Minnesota*	0	–	2	.000	0	–	4	.000
Michigan*	0	–	9	.000	0	–	11	.000
Rankings from AP Poll; *Michigan: 24 games vacated; including NIT champ. vacated due to sanctions against the program *Minnesota: 5 NCAA Tournament games vacated due to sanctions against the program Disputed records: Michigan-(24–11)(9–9); Minnesota-(31–4)(16–2)

The 1996–97 Minnesota Golden Gophers men's basketball team represented the University of Minnesota during the 1996–97 NCAA Division I men's basketball season. The team, coached by Clem Haskins, played their home games in Williams Arena in Minneapolis, Minnesota as members of the Big Ten Conference. They finished the season 31–4, 16–2 in Big Ten play to win the Big Ten championship. They received the conference's automatic bid to the NCAA tournament as the No. 1 seed in the Midwest region. There they defeated Southwest Texas State and Temple to advance to the Sweet Sixteen. In the Sweet Sixteen, they defeated Clemson and UCLA to advance to the Final Four for the first time in school history. There they lost to Kentucky.

In 1999, an academic fraud scandal revealed that Minnesota academic counseling office manager Jan Gangelhoff had done coursework for at least 20 Minnesota basketball players since 1993. Four players from the Minnesota basketball team were immediately suspended, pending an investigation for academic fraud. Head coach Clem Haskins, men's athletic director Mark Dienhart, and university vice president McKinley Boston all resigned. The NCAA sanctioned Minnesota by vacating all appearances in the 1994, 1995, and 1997 NCAA Tournaments and 1996 and 1998 National Invitation Tournaments, as well as individual records of those student-athletes found to have committed academic fraud. The NCAA further issued show-cause penalties for Haskins and Newby (both until October 23, 2007) and Gangelhoff (until October 23, 2005). The Gophers were also stripped of the Big Ten title due to the scandal.

== Roster ==
1996–97 Minnesota Golden Gophers men's basketball team
Players
Coaches

Pos.	#	Name	Height	Weight	Year	Previous school	Hometown
G	3	Russ Archambault	6 ft 1 in (1.85 m)	185 lb (84 kg)	Fr	Sartell	Fort Yates, ND
F	4	Courtney James	6 ft 8 in (2.03 m)	270 lb (122 kg)	So	Ben Davis	Indianapolis, IN
G/F	5	Sam Jacobson	6 ft 6 in (1.98 m)	210 lb (95 kg)	Jr	Park	Cottage Grove, MN
C	12	John Thomas	6 ft 9 in (2.06 m)	275 lb (125 kg)	Sr	Roosevelt	Minneapolis, MN
G	15	Aaron Stauber	6 ft 3 in (1.91 m)	185 lb (84 kg)	Sr	Sheboygan	Sheboygan, WI
G/F	20	Quincy Lewis	6 ft 7 in (2.01 m)	200 lb (91 kg)	So	Parkview Arts and Science Magnet	Little Rock, AR
F/C	22	Kevin Loge	6 ft 10 in (2.08 m)	230 lb (104 kg)	Fr	Morris Area	Morris, MN
G	24	Bobby Jackson	6 ft 1 in (1.85 m)	185 lb (84 kg)	Sr	Western Nebraska C.C.	Salisbury, NC
G	33	Eric Harris	6 ft 3 in (1.91 m)	195 lb (88 kg)	Jr	St. Raymond	New York, NY
C	34	Charles Thomas	6 ft 4 in (1.93 m)	200 lb (91 kg)	So	Harlan	Harlan, KY
F	42	Miles Tarver	6 ft 8 in (2.03 m)	225 lb (102 kg)	So	St. Joseph Notre Dame	Oakland, CA
C	50	Trevor Winter	7 ft 0 in (2.13 m)	275 lb (125 kg)	Sr	Slayton	Slayton, MN
C	51	Kyle Sanden	6 ft 11 in (2.11 m)	230 lb (104 kg)	Fr	Lincoln	Thief River Falls, MN

Head coach

- Clem Haskins (Western Kentucky)

Assistant coach(es)

Legend

- (C) Team captain
- (S) Suspended
- (I) Ineligible
- (W) Walk-on
- Injured
- Current redshirt

Roster

== Schedule and results ==
Date time, TV	Rank^{#}	Opponent^{#}	Result	Record	Site city, state
Non-conference regular season
November 23*	No. 23	Stephen F. Austin	W 101–55	1–0	Williams Arena; Minneapolis, MN
November 26*	No. 24	West Virginia	W 76–61	2–0	Target Center; Minneapolis, MN
November 29*	No. 24	vs. Puerto Rico-Mayagüez; San Juan Shootout	W 104–62	3–0	San Juan, PR
November 30*	No. 24	vs. Creighton; San Juan Shootout	W 64–63	4–0	San Juan, PR
December 1*	No. 24	vs. No. 10 Clemson; San Juan Shootout	W 75–65	5–0	San Juan, PR
December 5*	No. 16	at Alabama	L 67–70	5–1	Coleman Coliseum; Tuscaloosa, AL
December 15*	No. 17	St. John's	W 77–39	6–1	Williams Arena; Minneapolis, MN
December 17*	No. 16	at Rhode Island	W 82–72	7–1	Keaney Gymnasium; Kingston, RI
December 21*	No. 16	at Nebraska	W 70–56	8–1	Bob Devaney Sports Center; Lincoln, NE
December 23*	No. 16	Alabama State	W 114–34	9–1	Williams Arena; Minneapolis, MN
December 28*	No. 15	Long Island University	W 104–84	10–1	Williams Arena; Minneapolis, MN
December 31*	No. 15	Mercer	W 94–53	11–1	Williams Arena; Minneapolis, MN
Big Ten regular season
January 2	No. 15	Wisconsin	W 65–48	12–1 (1–0)	Williams Arena; Minneapolis, MN
January 4	No. 15	at Michigan State	W 68–43	13–1 (2–0)	Breslin Center; East Lansing, MI
January 8	No. 11	at No. 15 Indiana	W 96–91 ^{OT}	14–1 (3–0)	Assembly Hall; Bloomington, IN
January 11	No. 11	No. 16 Michigan	W 70–64	15–1 (4–0)	Williams Arena; Minneapolis, MN
January 14	No. 7	at Illinois	L 90–96	15–2 (4–1)	Assembly Hall; Champaign, IL
January 18	No. 7	at Ohio State	W 73–67	16–2 (5–1)	St. John Arena; Columbus, OH
January 23	No. 8	Iowa	W 66–51	17–2 (6–1)	Williams Arena; Minneapolis, MN
January 25	No. 8	Purdue	W 91–68	18–2 (7–1)	Williams Arena; Minneapolis, MN
February 1	No. 6	at Northwestern	W 75–56	19–2 (8–1)	Welsh-Ryan Arena; Evanston, IL
February 5	No. 4	Penn State	W 85–70	20–2 (9–1)	Williams Arena; Minneapolis, MN
February 12	No. 3	at Purdue	W 70–67	21–2 (10–1)	Mackey Arena; West Lafayette, IN
February 15	No. 3	at Iowa	W 68–66	22–2 (11–1)	Carver–Hawkeye Arena; Iowa City, IA
February 19	No. 2	Ohio State	W 60–48	23–2 (12–1)	Williams Arena; Minneapolis, MN
February 22	No. 2	No. 23 Illinois	W 67–66	24–2 (13–1)	Williams Arena; Minneapolis, MN
February 26	No. 2	at No. 24 Michigan	W 55–54	25–2 (14–1)	Crisler Arena; Ann Arbor, MI
March 1	No. 2	No. 22 Indiana	W 75–72	26–2 (15–1)	Williams Arena; Minneapolis, MN
March 6	No. 2	Michigan State	W 81–74	27–2 (16–1)	Williams Arena; Minneapolis, MN
March 8	No. 2	at Wisconsin	L 65–66	27–3 (16–2)	Wisconsin Field House; Madison, WI
NCAA tournament
March 14*; CBS Regional	(1 MW) No. 3	vs. (16 MW) Southwest Texas State; First Round	W 78–46	28–3	Kemper Arena; Kansas City, MO
March 16*; CBS Regional	(1 MW) No. 3	vs. (9 MW) Temple; Second Round	W 76–57	29–3	Kemper Arena; Kansas City, MO
March 20*; CBS Regional	(1 MW) No. 3	vs. (4 MW) No. 14 Clemson; Sweet Sixteen	W 90–84 ^{2OT}	30–3	Alamodome; San Antonio, TX
March 22*; CBS	(1 MW) No. 3	vs. (2 MW) No. 7 UCLA; Elite Eight	W 80–72	31–3	Alamodome; San Antonio, TX
March 29*; CBS	(1 MW) No. 3	vs. (1 W) No. 5 Kentucky; Final Four	L 69–78	31–4	RCA Dome; Indianapolis, IN
*Non-conference game. ^{#}Rankings from AP Poll. (#) Tournament seedings in parentheses. MW=Midwest; Source. All times are in Central Time.

== Awards ==
Team MVP

- Bobby Jackson
