= Benton Ridge, Ohio =

- Village
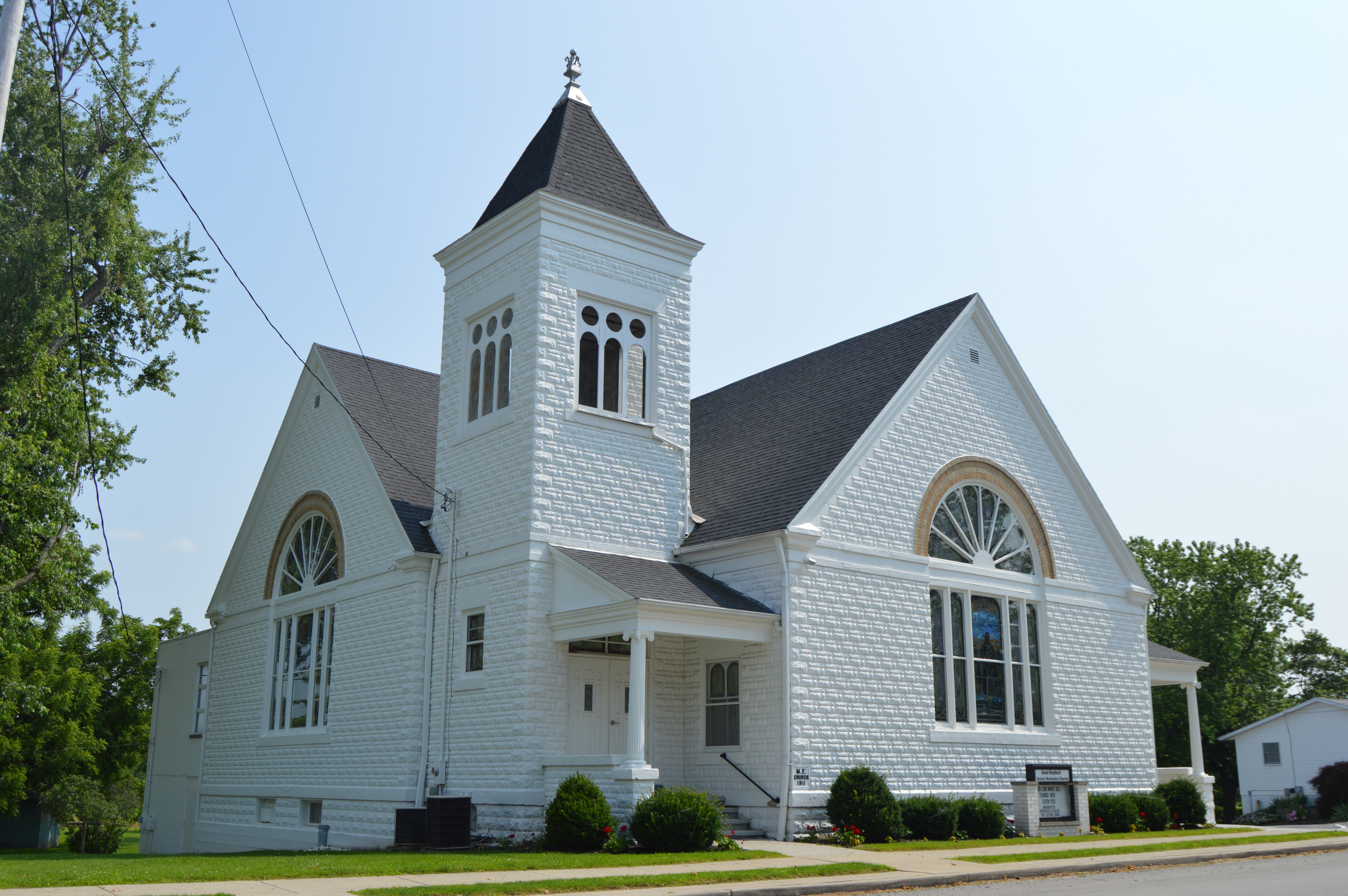
- Good Shepherd United Methodist Church

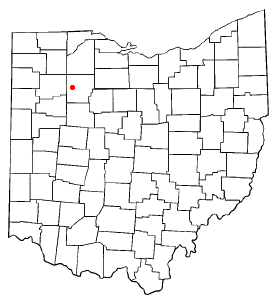
- Location of Benton Ridge, Ohio

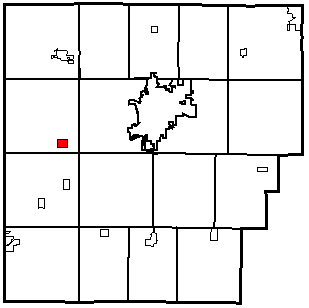
- Location of Benton Ridge in Hancock County
- Coordinates: 41°00′16″N 83°47′31″W
- Country: United States
- State: Ohio
- County: Hancock

Government
  - Type: Village council

Area
  - Total: 0.37 sq mi (0.97 km^{2})
  - Land: 0.37 sq mi (0.97 km^{2})
  - Water: 0 sq mi (0.00 km^{2})
- Elevation: 784 ft (239 m)

Population (2020)
  - Total: 272
  - Estimate (2023): 263
  - Density: 725.9/sq mi (280.26/km^{2})
- Time zone: UTC-5 (Eastern (EST))
  - Summer (DST): UTC-4 (EDT)
- ZIP code: 45816
- Area code: 419
- FIPS code: 39-05662
- GNIS feature ID: 2398098

Benton Ridge is a village in Hancock County, Ohio, United States. The population was 272 at the 2020 census. It is within the boundaries of the Liberty-Benton Local School district.

== History ==
Benton Ridge was originally called Benton, and under the latter name was laid out in 1835 and named for Thomas Hart Benton (1782–1858), a U.S. Senator from Missouri. Some of the earliest settlers of Benton Ridge are buried in Swartz Cemetery, which also has a Veteran's Memorial. A post office called Benton Ridge has been in operation since 1837. The village was incorporated in 1875.

In 1994, the Benton Ridge postmaster Fairy Parkins was named Postmaster of the Year for the state of Ohio.

The Benton Ridge Telephone Company was founded in 1902, and is an Incumbent Local Exchange Carrier for 3 exchanges in west central Ohio. It provides telecommunication services in rural communities, spinning off a cable TV and internet company in 1992 (WATCH), as well as a fiber based internet company (CFS) in 2010. The company was acquired by Cequel III in 2022.

On Nov. 1, 1941, just one month before the Japanese attack on Pearl Harbor, a B-25 bomber on a training mission flying out of Wright-Patterson Air Force Base, crashed nearby.

Solt Automotive Engineering, one of the oldest go-kart manufacturers in the USA, was located just outside of Benton Ridge.

== Geography ==
According to the United States Census Bureau, the village has a total area of 0.34 square miles (0.88 km^{2}), all land.

== Demographics ==
Historical population
Census	Pop.	Note	%±
1880	179		—
1890	250		39.7%
1900	359		43.6%
1910	352		−1.9%
1920	240		−31.8%
1930	245		2.1%
1940	304		24.1%
1950	337		10.9%
1960	325		−3.6%
1970	329		1.2%
1980	343		4.3%
1990	351		2.3%
2000	315		−10.3%
2010	299		−5.1%
2020	272		−9.0%
2023 (est.)	263	▼	−3.3%
U.S. Decennial Census

=== 2010 census ===
As of the census of 2010, there were 299 people, 116 households, and 77 families living in the village. The population density was 879.4 inhabitants per square mile (339.5/km^{2}). There were 119 housing units at an average density of 350.0 per square mile (135.1/km^{2}). The racial makeup of the village was 95.7% White, 0.7% Native American, 1.7% from other races, and 2.0% from two or more races. Hispanic or Latino of any race were 2.0% of the population.

There were 116 households, of which 30.2% had children under the age of 18 living with them, 51.7% were married couples living together, 8.6% had a female householder with no husband present, 6.0% had a male householder with no wife present, and 33.6% were non-families. 28.4% of all households were made up of individuals, and 12.1% had someone living alone who was 65 years of age or older. The average household size was 2.58 and the average family size was 3.04.

The median age in the village was 37.4 years. 24.4% of residents were under the age of 18; 9.7% were between the ages of 18 and 24; 29.1% were from 25 to 44; 23.1% were from 45 to 64; and 13.7% were 65 years of age or older. The gender makeup of the village was 50.8% male and 49.2% female.

=== 2000 census ===
As of the census of 2000, there were 315 people, 118 households, and 82 families living in the village. The population density was 678.6 inhabitants per square mile (262.0/km^{2}). There were 122 housing units at an average density of 262.8 per square mile (101.5/km^{2}). The racial makeup of the village was 99.37% White, 0.32% African American and 0.32% Native American. Hispanic or Latino of any race were 0.95% of the population.

There were 118 households, out of which 40.7% had children under the age of 18 living with them, 59.3% were married couples living together, 6.8% had a female householder with no husband present, and 29.7% were non-families. 28.0% of all households were made up of individuals, and 11.0% had someone living alone who was 65 years of age or older. The average household size was 2.67 and the average family size was 3.34.

In the village, the population was spread out, with 30.8% under the age of 18, 7.0% from 18 to 24, 32.4% from 25 to 44, 20.3% from 45 to 64, and 9.5% who were 65 years of age or older. The median age was 34 years. For every 100 females there were 103.2 males. For every 100 females age 18 and over, there were 100.0 males.

The median income for a household in the village was $50,000, and the median income for a family was $56,250. Males had a median income of $30,000 versus $25,208 for females. The per capita income for the village was $18,426. About 1.3% of families and 2.3% of the population were below the poverty line, including 1.4% of those under age 18 and 9.4% of those age 65 or over.

== Notable people ==
- Aaron Craft - basketball point guard
- A. J. Granger - basketball player, NCAA champion in 2000
- Fred Hissong - U.S. Army Lieutenant General
