= 1996–97 Illinois Fighting Illini men's basketball team =

American college basketball season

1996–97 Illinois Fighting Illini men's basketball

Illini Classic, Champion

NCAA men's Division I tournament, second round
- Conference: Big Ten Conference

Ranking
- AP: No. 19
- Record: 22–10 (11–7 Big Ten)
- Head coach: Lon Kruger (1st season)
- Assistant coaches: Robert McCullum (1st season); Rob Judson (1st season); Mike Shepherd (1st season)
- MVP: Kiwane Garris
- Captains: Herb Caldwell; Kiwane Garris; Chris Gandy
- Home arena: Assembly Hall

1996–97 Big Ten Conference men's basketball standings
	Conf.				Overall
Team	W		L	PCT	W		L	PCT
Iowa	12	–	6	.667	22	–	10	.688
Purdue	12	–	6	.667	18	–	12	.600
No. 19 Illinois	11	–	7	.611	22	–	10	.688
Wisconsin	11	–	7	.611	18	–	10	.643
Indiana	9	–	9	.500	22	–	11	.667
Michigan State	9	–	9	.500	17	–	12	.586
Ohio State	5	–	13	.278	10	–	17	.370
Penn State	3	–	15	.167	10	–	17	.370
Northwestern	2	–	16	.111	7	–	22	.241
No. 3 Minnesota*	0	–	2	.000	0	–	4	.000
Michigan*	0	–	9	.000	0	–	11	.000
Rankings from AP Poll; *Michigan: 24 games vacated; including NIT champ. vacated due to sanctions against the program *Minnesota: 5 NCAA Tournament games vacated due to sanctions against the program Disputed records: Michigan-(24–11)(9–9); Minnesota-(31–4)(16–2)

The 1996–97 Illinois Fighting Illini men's basketball team represented the University of Illinois.

== Regular season ==
On March 21, 1996, a new era in Illinois basketball began when Director of Athletics Ron Guenther introduced Lon Kruger as the university's 14th men's basketball coach. Kruger came to Illinois from the University of Florida and carried a list of impressive credentials, including guiding Florida to the Final Four in 1994. In his first year at Illinois, Kruger guided Illinois to a 22–10 record and the second round of the NCAA tournament. Over the course of the season, Illinois defeated five ranked opponents, including No. 7 Minnesota, 96–90, at the Assembly Hall. Illinois also traveled to Bloomington and handed Indiana a 78–74 loss, the first win for Illinois at Assembly Hall in Bloomington since 1990. During the course of the year, Kiwane Garris etched his name in the Illinois record book with one of the best season performances by any Illini player in history. He finished his career second on the all-time scoring list with 1,948 points and set the single-season record for free throws made and attempted. Garris averaged 19.4 points and missed being the Big Ten’s leading scorer by three one-hundredths of a point.

=== Roster ===
1996–97 Illinois Fighting Illini men's basketball team
Players
Coaches

Pos.	#	Name	Height	Weight	Year	Previous school	Hometown
F	00	Victor Chukwudebe	6 ft 7 in (2.01 m)	230 lb (104 kg)	Fr	Lanphier High School	Springfield, Illinois
C	4	Fess Hawkins (redshirt)	6 ft 9 in (2.06 m)	277 lb (126 kg)	Fr	Dollarway High School/Northwestern University	Pine Bluff, Arkansas
G	5	Halim Abdullah	5 ft 9 in (1.75 m)	155 lb (70 kg)	Jr	St. Anthony High School	Jersey City, New Jersey
G	10	Jelani Boline	5 ft 10 in (1.78 m)	170 lb (77 kg)	Sr	Whitney Young High School	Chicago, Illinois
G	12	Jeff Reichardt	6 ft 1 in (1.85 m)	185 lb (84 kg)	So	Schaumburg High School	Schaumburg, Illinois
G	21	Matt Heldman	6 ft 0 in (1.83 m)	165 lb (75 kg)	Jr	Libertyville High School	Libertyville, Illinois
G	22	Kiwane Garris (C)	6 ft 2 in (1.88 m)	185 lb (84 kg)	Sr	Westinghouse High School	Chicago, Illinois
G	25	Bryant Notree	6 ft 5 in (1.96 m)	205 lb (93 kg)	Jr	Simeon High School	Chicago, Illinois
G	31	David Freeman	6 ft 4 in (1.93 m)	205 lb (93 kg)	Jr	Champaign Central High School	Champaign, Illinois
F	32	Jarrod Gee	6 ft 8 in (2.03 m)	240 lb (109 kg)	Jr	St. Martin de Porres High School	Chicago, Illinois
G	33	Kevin Turner	6 ft 3 in (1.91 m)	170 lb (77 kg)	Jr	Simeon High School	Chicago, Illinois
F	34	Brian Johnson	6 ft 7 in (2.01 m)	215 lb (98 kg)	RS Jr	Maine West High School	Des Plaines, Illinois
F	40	Jerry Hester (injured) (redshirt)	6 ft 6 in (1.98 m)	210 lb (95 kg)	Sr	Manual High School	Peoria, Illinois
F	42	Herb Caldwell (C)	6 ft 8 in (2.03 m)	220 lb (100 kg)	Sr	Jacksonville High School	Jacksonville, Illinois
F	45	Chris Gandy (C)	6 ft 9 in (2.06 m)	205 lb (93 kg)	RS Sr	Bradley-Bourbonnais High School	Kankakee, Illinois

Head coach

- Lon Kruger (Kansas State) (1st year)

Assistant coach(es)

- Rob Judson (University of Illinois) (1st year)
- Robert McCullum (Seminole State) (1st year)
- Mike Shepherd (Kansas State) (1st year)

Legend

- (C) Team captain
- (S) Suspended
- (I) Ineligible
- (W) Walk-on
- Injured
- Current redshirt

Roster

== Schedule ==
Date time, TV	Rank^{#}	Opponent^{#}	Result	Record	Site (attendance) city, state
Non-Conference regular season
11/22/1996*		at Illinois-Chicago	W 68–63	1–0	UIC Pavilion (8,715); Chicago, IL
11/25/1996*		Delaware State	W 92–51	2–0	Assembly Hall (10,993); Champaign, IL
11/29/1996*		vs. TCU; Big Island Invitational	W 73–67	3–0	Afook-Chinen Auditorium (1,000); Hilo, HI
11/30/1996*		vs. Louisville; Big Island Invitational	L 60–70	3–1	Afook-Chinen Auditorium (1,000); Hilo, HI
12/1/1996*		vs. Virginia Tech; Big Island Invitational	W 92–68	4–1	Afook-Chinen Auditorium (1,000); Hilo, HI
12/3/1996*		at California	L 88–89 ^{2ot}	4–2	Harmon Gym (6,578); Berkeley, CA
12/6/1996*		Columbia; Illini Classic	W 84–59	5–2	Assembly Hall (11,847); Champaign, IL
12/7/1996*		Tennessee State; Illini Classic	W 86–73	6–2	Assembly Hall (12,160); Champaign, IL
12/11/1996*	No. 12	Chicago State	W 94–57	7–2	Assembly Hall (8,757); Champaign, IL
12/14/1996*		Coppin State	W 91–55	8–2	Assembly Hall (14,269); Champaign, IL
12/21/1996*		vs. No. 24 UCLA	W 79–63	9–2	United Center (15,331); Chicago, IL
12/28/1996*		vs. Missouri; Braggin' Rights	W 85–69	10–2	Scottrade Center (22,371); St. Louis, MO
Big Ten regular season
1/2/1997	No. 24	Purdue	L 69–75	10–3 (0–1)	Assembly Hall (15,364); Champaign, IL
1/4/1997	No. 24	at Ohio State	W 72–64	11–3 (1–1)	St. John Arena (10,503); Columbus, OH
1/9/1996	No. 25	at No. 16 Michigan	L 74–88	11–4 (1–2)	Crisler Arena (13,265); Ann Arbor, MI
1/11/1997	No. 25	Penn State	W 85–70	12–4 (2–2)	Assembly Hall (14,251); Champaign, IL
1/14/1997		No. 7 Minnesota	W 96–90	13–4 (3–2)	Assembly Hall (12,326); Champaign, IL
1/22/1997		at Michigan State	W 66–63	14–4 (4–2)	Breslin Student Events Center (12,975); East Lansing, MI
1/25/1997		Wisconsin	L 56–73	14–5 (4–3)	Assembly Hall (15,448); Champaign, IL
1/29/1997		at Iowa; Rivalry	L 65–82	14–6 (4–4)	Carver–Hawkeye Arena (15,500); Iowa City, IA
2/2/1997		at No. 17 Indiana; Rivalry	W 78–74	15–6 (5–4)	Assembly Hall (17,341); Bloomington, IN
2/5/1997		Northwestern; Rivalry	W 70–58	16–6 (6–4)	Assembly Hall (12,430); Champaign, IL
2/9/1997		No. 25 Iowa; Rivalry	W 66–51	17–6 (7–4)	Assembly Hall (16,450); Champaign, IL
2/12/1997	No. 20	at Wisconsin	L 45–62	17–7 (7–5)	Wisconsin Field House (11,500); Madison, WI
2/15/1997	No. 20	Michigan State	W 79–68	18–7 (8–5)	Assembly Hall (16,450); Champaign, IL
2/22/1997	No. 23	at No. 2 Minnesota	L 66–67	18–8 (8–6)	Williams Arena (14,554); Minneapolis, MN
2/25/1997	No. 21	at Penn State	W 87–65	19–8 (9–6)	Bryce Jordan Center (12,697); University Park, PA
3/2/1997	No. 21	No. 24 Michigan	W 70–51	20–8 (10–6)	Assembly Hall (16,450); Champaign, IL
3/5/1997	No. 15	Ohio State	W 90–83	21–8 (11–6)	St. John Arena (13,702); Columbus, OH
3/8/1997	No. 15	at Purdue	L 69–77	21–9 (11–7)	Mackey Arena (14,123); West Lafayette, IN
NCAA tournament
3/14/1997*	(6 S) No. 19	vs. (11 S) Southern California; First Round	W 90–77	22–9	Charlotte Coliseum (11,206); Charlotte, NC
3/16/1997*	(6 S) No. 19	vs. (14 S) UT Chattanooga; Second Round	L 63–75	22–10	Charlotte Coliseum (14,864); Charlotte, NC
*Non-conference game. ^{#}Rankings from AP Poll. (#) Tournament seedings in parentheses. All times are in Central Time.

== Player stats ==
Player	Games Played	2 pt. Field Goals	3 pt. Field Goals	Free Throws	Rebounds	Assists	Blocks	Steals	Points
Kiwane Garris	32	95	76	204	113	180	2	52	622
Chris Gandy	32	120	14	69	181	18	21	28	352
Kevin Turner	32	58	62	21	75	66	1	32	323
Matt Heldman	32	42	64	47	110	66	1	41	322
Bryant Notree	32	82	10	58	118	42	1	22	252
Jarrod Gee	32	86	0	23	123	21	10	14	195
Brian Johnson	32	58	1	53	121	64	14	20	172
Victor Chukwudebe	32	37	0	12	69	5	12	12	86
Jerry Hester	5	20	6	13	28	13	0	4	71
Halim Abdullah	26	5	5	8	6	25	0	16	33
Herb Caldwell	17	2	0	5	9	1	0	0	9
David Freeman	17	4	0	0	7	5	1	4	8
Jelani Boline	15	0	0	1	7	9	0	4	1
Jeff Reichardt	2	0	0	0	2	0	0	0	0

== NCAA basketball tournament ==
- Southeast regional
  - Illinois 90, Southern Cal 77
  - Tennessee-Chattanooga 75, Illinois 63

== Awards and honors ==
- Kiwane Garris
  - Associated Press All-American Honorable Mention
  - Team Most Valuable Player

== Team players drafted into the NBA ==
Player	NBA Club	Round	Pick
