= Liberty-Benton High School =

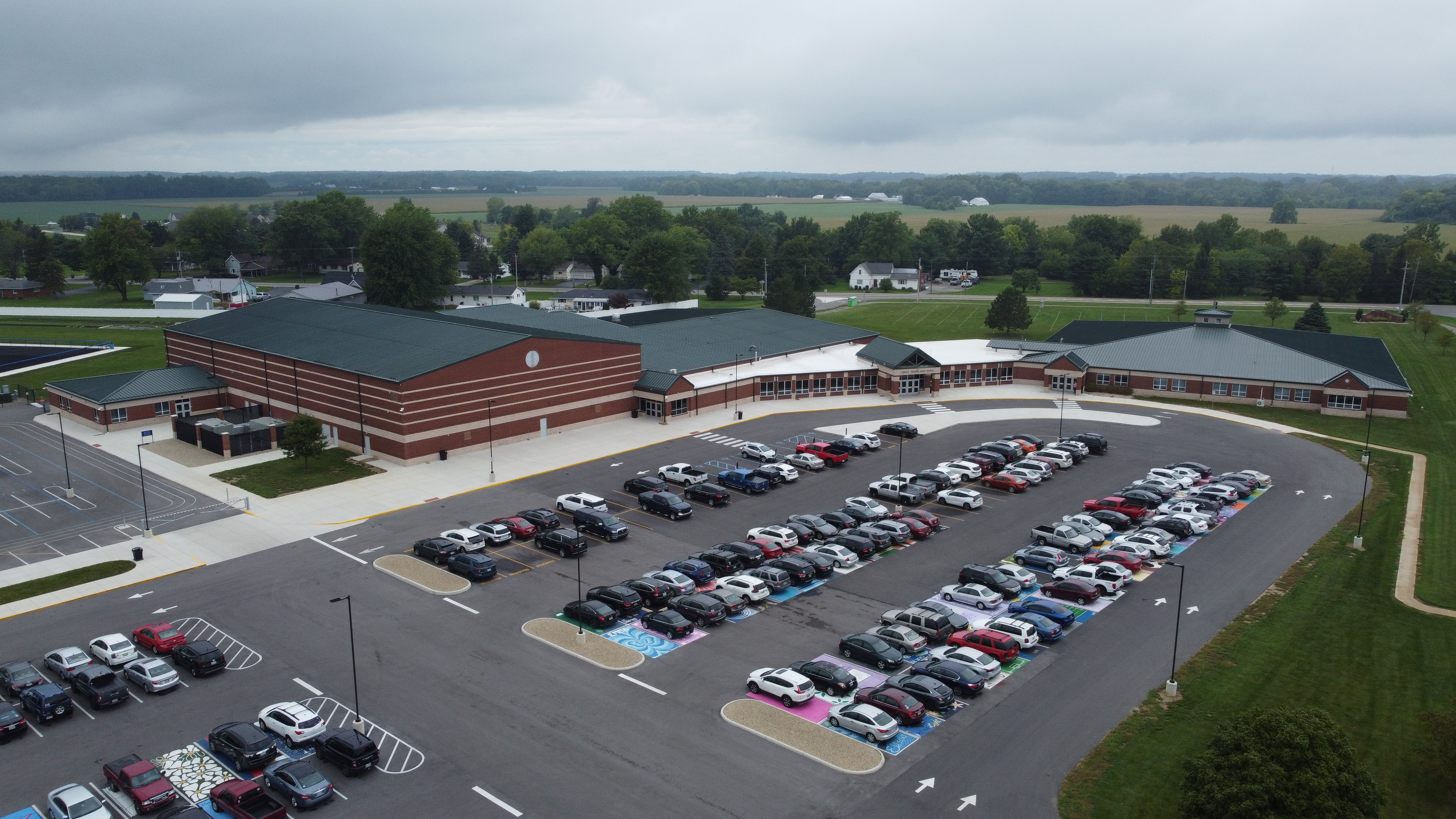

Location
- 9190 County Road 9 Findlay, Ohio 45840; United States; 41°2′3″N 83°41′59″W

Information
- Type: Public, Coeducational high school
- School district: Liberty-Benton Local Schools
- Superintendent: Bruce Otley
- Principal: Ben Gerken
- Teaching staff: 27.86 (FTE)
- Grades: 9-12
- Enrollment: 549 (2024-2025)
- Student to teacher ratio: 19.71
- Colors: Royal Blue and White, with Red accent
- Athletics conference: Northern Lakes League
- Nickname: Eagles
- Rival: Arlington Red Devils
- Website: www.liberty-benton.org/hs-home.aspx

Liberty-Benton High School is a public high school near Findlay, Ohio, and the only high school in the Liberty-Benton Local School district. It is named for Liberty Township, the village of Benton Ridge, and Eagle Township. Its mascot is the bald eagle, and its school colors are royal blue and white, accented with red. It is also a member of the Blanchard Valley Conference. In 1995, the school expanded by building a new high school facility about a fourth of a mile from the main building. After the new building was completed, all sports programs except football, baseball, track, and softball were moved to the new building. Football and track continued at the main school until 2003. The baseball and softball teams played at Benton Ridge Park until fields at the new high school were finished in the late 2000s. The new high school hosts district tournaments in basketball, volleyball, and track.

== Ohio High School Athletic Association State Championships ==
- Boys Basketball – 1995
- Girls Basketball - 2010
- Boys Track and Field – 1995, 2000 (as co-champion), 2005
- Girls Cross Country – 1984, 1985, 1986, 1996
- Girls Track and Field - 2015, 2016
- Girls Volleyball - 2019, 2021 (undefeated season)

== Notable alumni ==
- Aaron Craft - basketball point guard
- A. J. Granger - basketball player, NCAA champion in 2000
- Fred Hissong - U.S. Army Lieutenant General
