= 1996–97 Michigan Wolverines men's basketball team =

American college basketball season

1996–97 Michigan Wolverines men's basketball

National Invitational Tournament champions (vacated)
- Conference: Big Ten Conference

Ranking
- Coaches: No. 24
- Record: 0–11 (24–11 unadjusted) (0–9 Big Ten)
- Head coach: Steve Fisher
- Assistant coaches: Brian Dutcher; Scott Perry; Scott Trost
- MVP: Robert Traylor
- Captains: Travis Conlan; Robert Traylor
- Home arena: Crisler Arena

1996–97 Big Ten Conference men's basketball standings
	Conf.				Overall
Team	W		L	PCT	W		L	PCT
Iowa	12	–	6	.667	22	–	10	.688
Purdue	12	–	6	.667	18	–	12	.600
No. 19 Illinois	11	–	7	.611	22	–	10	.688
Wisconsin	11	–	7	.611	18	–	10	.643
Indiana	9	–	9	.500	22	–	11	.667
Michigan State	9	–	9	.500	17	–	12	.586
Ohio State	5	–	13	.278	10	–	17	.370
Penn State	3	–	15	.167	10	–	17	.370
Northwestern	2	–	16	.111	7	–	22	.241
No. 3 Minnesota*	0	–	2	.000	0	–	4	.000
Michigan*	0	–	9	.000	0	–	11	.000
Rankings from AP Poll; *Michigan: 24 games vacated; including NIT champ. vacated due to sanctions against the program *Minnesota: 5 NCAA Tournament games vacated due to sanctions against the program Disputed records: Michigan-(24–11)(9–9); Minnesota-(31–4)(16–2)

The 1996–97 Michigan Wolverines men's basketball team represented the University of Michigan in intercollegiate college basketball during the 1996–97 season. The team played its home games in the Crisler Arena in Ann Arbor, Michigan, and was a member of the Big Ten Conference. Under the direction of head coach Steve Fisher, the team finished tied for sixth in the Big Ten Conference. The team earned an invitation to the 1997 National Invitation Tournament where it emerged as champion. The team was ranked for sixteen of the eighteen weeks of Associated Press Top Twenty-Five Poll, starting the season ranked ninth, peaking at number fourth and ending unranked, and it also ended the season unranked in the final USA Today/CNN Poll. The team had a 3–4 record against ranked opponents, including the following victories: December 8, 1996, against #10 Duke 62–61 on the road, December 21, 1996, against #6 Arizona 73–71 in overtime at the Palace of Auburn Hills, and on January 9, 1997, against #25 Illinois 88–74 at home.

Robert Traylor and Travis Conlan served as team co-captains, while Robert Traylor and Louis Bullock shared team MVP honors. The team's leading scorers were Louis Bullock (569 points), Robert Traylor (460 points), and Maurice Taylor (433 points). The leading rebounders were Robert Traylor (271), Maceo Baston (231), and Maurice Taylor (218).

Bullock led the Big Ten Conference in three-point field goals made in all games (101) and free throw percentage in conference games (89.3%). The team led the Big Ten in scoring average with a 73.3 average in conference games.

Bullock set school records for single-season three-point field goals (101) made and single-season free throw percentage (84.48), surpassing Glen Rice (99, 1989) and Cazzie Russell (84.27, 1964), respectively. Both marks continue to be school bests but carry an asterisk due to Bullock's participation in the University of Michigan basketball scandal. Bullock would surpass his free throw percentage mark two years later. The team set a new school record for single-season three-point shots made (203), which they would rebreak the following season. This surpassed the 196 total set in 1989.

== National Invitation Tournament ==
- West
  - Michigan 76, Miami 63
- Second Round
  - Michigan 75, Oklahoma State 65
- Quarterfinal
  - Michigan 67, Notre Dame 66
- Semifinal
  - Michigan 77, Arkansas 62
- Final
  - Michigan 82, Florida State 73

== Statistics ==
The team posted the following statistics:

Name	GP	GS	Min	Avg	FG	FGA	FG%	3FG	3FGA	3FG%	FT	FTA	FT%	OR	DR	RB	Avg	Ast	Avg	PF	DQ	TO	Stl	Blk	Pts	Avg
Louis Bullock*	35	35	1169	33.4	181	396	0.457	101	214	0.472	106	128	0.828	22	83	105	3.0	76	2.2	65	1	60	38	5	569	16.3
Robert Traylor*	35	35	952	27.2	190	342	0.556	0	0		80	176	0.455	121	150	271	7.7	33	0.9	117	5	99	40	36	460	13.1
Maurice Taylor*	35	33	1052	30.1	174	342	0.509	1	5	0.200	84	117	0.718	84	134	218	6.2	40	1.1	95	4	71	26	31	433	12.4
Maceo Baston	34	11	830	24.4	115	201	0.572	0	1	0.000	122	182	0.670	106	125	231	6.8	15	0.4	97	4	65	29	35	352	10.3
Brandun Hughes	34	2	939	27.6	108	275	0.393	26	88	0.295	57	78	0.731	19	47	66	1.9	79	2.3	94	4	80	20	0	299	8.8
Jerod Ward	35	25	813	23.2	98	279	0.351	46	134	0.343	50	71	0.704	51	72	123	3.5	27	0.8	66	1	64	17	9	292	8.3
Travis Conlan	35	34	1122	32.1	56	148	0.378	28	79	0.354	26	45	0.578	39	92	131	3.7	157	4.5	81	4	85	54	4	166	4.7
Peter Vignier	24	0	85	3.5	3	11	0.273	0	0		1	4	0.250	9	7	16	0.7	1	0.0		0	5	1	4	7	0.3
Ron Oliver	23	0	60	2.6	2	9	0.222	1	1	1.000	2	2	1.000	1	1	2	0.1	2	0.1	17	0	5	4	1	7	0.3
Tai Streets	13	0	36	2.8	1	1	1.000	0	0		2	4	0.500	3	4	7	0.5	1	0.1	10	0	2	0	1	4	0.3
Ryan DeKuiper	9	0	13	1.4	1	5	0.200	0	3	0.000	0	2	0.000	3	0	3	0.3	2	0.2	0	0	2	0	0	2	0.2
Darius Taylor	6	0	6	1.0	1	3	0.333	0	0		0	0		1	0	1	0.2	0	0.0		0	0	0	0	2	0.3
Josh Palmer	1	0	1	1.0	1	1	1.000	0	0		0	0		0	0	0	0.0	0	0.0	1	0	2	0	0	2	2.0
Erik Szyndlar	10	0	13	1.3	0	0		0	0		0	0		0	2	2	0.2			0	0	0	1	0	0	0.0
Nick Haratsaris	7	0	9	1.3	0	4	0.000	0	3	0.000	0	0		0	3	3	0.4			0	0	3	0	0	0	0.0
TEAM	35													52	70	122	3.5					4				
Season Total	35				931	2017	0.462	203	528	0.384	530	809	0.655	511	790	1301	37.2				23	547	230	126	2595	74.1
Opponents	35				870	2055	0.423	200	611	0.327	440	667	0.660	494	710	1204	34.4	489	14.0	701	19	550	232	91	2380	68.0

* Denotes players whose individual records, awards and other honors have been vacated due to NCAA and U-M sanctions

== Rankings ==
Ranking movements Legend: ██ Increase in ranking ██ Decrease in ranking
	Week																	
Poll	Pre	1	2	3	4	5	6	7	8	9	10	11	12	13	14	15	16	Final
AP Poll	9	9	7	7	5	4	4	8	16	18	13	16	13	14	18	24		

== Team players drafted into the NBA ==
Four players from this team were selected in the NBA draft.

Year	Round	Pick	Overall	Player	NBA Club
1997	1	14	14	Maurice Taylor	Los Angeles Clippers
1998	1	6	6	Robert Traylor	Dallas Mavericks
1998	2	29	58	Maceo Baston	Chicago Bulls
1999	2	13	42	Louis Bullock	Minnesota Timberwolves

== See also ==
- 1997 National Invitation Tournament
- List of vacated and forfeited games in college basketball
- University of Michigan basketball scandal
