= 1996–97 Michigan State Spartans men's basketball team =

American college basketball season

1996–97 Michigan State Spartans men's basketball

Oldsmobile Spartan Classic champions

NIT, second round
- Conference: Big Ten Conference
- Record: 17–12 (9–9 Big Ten)
- Head coach: Tom Izzo (2nd season)
- Assistant coaches: Tom Crean (2nd season); Stan Heath (1st season); Mike Garland (1st season)
- Captains: Steve Polonowski; Antonio Smith
- Home arena: Breslin Center

1996–97 Big Ten Conference men's basketball standings
	Conf.				Overall
Team	W		L	PCT	W		L	PCT
Iowa	12	–	6	.667	22	–	10	.688
Purdue	12	–	6	.667	18	–	12	.600
No. 19 Illinois	11	–	7	.611	22	–	10	.688
Wisconsin	11	–	7	.611	18	–	10	.643
Indiana	9	–	9	.500	22	–	11	.667
Michigan State	9	–	9	.500	17	–	12	.586
Ohio State	5	–	13	.278	10	–	17	.370
Penn State	3	–	15	.167	10	–	17	.370
Northwestern	2	–	16	.111	7	–	22	.241
No. 3 Minnesota*	0	–	2	.000	0	–	4	.000
Michigan*	0	–	9	.000	0	–	11	.000
Rankings from AP Poll; *Michigan: 24 games vacated; including NIT champ. vacated due to sanctions against the program *Minnesota: 5 NCAA Tournament games vacated due to sanctions against the program Disputed records: Michigan-(24–11)(9–9); Minnesota-(31–4)(16–2)

The 1996–97 Michigan State Spartans men's basketball team represented Michigan State University in the 1996–97 NCAA Division I men's basketball season. The team played their home games at Breslin Center in East Lansing, Michigan. They were coached by second-year head coach, Tom Izzo, and were members of the Big Ten Conference. The Spartans finished the season with a record of 17–12, 9–9 in Big Ten play to finish in a three-way tie for sixth place. MSU received a bid to the National Invitation Tournament for the second consecutive year where they defeated George Washington in the first round before losing to Florida State in the second round.

As a result of the Big Ten moving to 11 teams with the addition of Penn State in 1992, teams were not guaranteed two games against each other. Accordingly, Michigan and Michigan State, who were only scheduled to play each other once in conference play, chose to play one game against each other that did not count as a conference game.

The season was also notable as the last season MSU did not make the NCAA tournament (as of 2024).

== Previous season ==
The Spartans finished the 1995–96 season 16–11, 9–9 in Big Ten play to finish in sixth place. Michigan State received an invitation to the NIT and advanced to the second round.

The Spartans lost Quinton Brooks (16.3 points and 5.6 rebounds per game) to graduation and Jamie Feick (10.1 points and 9.5 rebounds per game) to the NBA draft following the season.

== Season summary ==
The Spartans began the season looking for their first trip to the NCAA Tournament since 1995. They were led by freshman Mateen Cleaves (10.2 points and 5.0 assists per game) and seniors Ray Weathers (13.6 points per game) and Jon Garavaglia (10.4 points and 5.9 rebounds per game). The Spartans played no ranked teams in the non-conference season. The non-conference schedule was notable for a triple overtime loss to Detroit Mercy, a game played at Calihan Hall on Detroit's campus. MSU also avenged their 1995 NCAA tournament loss to Weber State by beating the Wildcats in East Lansing. MSU finished the non-conference season at 7–1.

The Spartans opened the Big Ten season with losses to No. 12 Indiana and No. 15 Minnesota. A four-game winning streak followed, but was stopped by a five-game losing streak including losses to No. 13 Michigan in a non-conference matchup and at No. 16 Michigan. The Spartans ended the season on a high note with a win over No. 25 Indiana. The Spartans finished in a tie for sixth place in the conference with a record of 16–11 overall and 9–9 in conference.

The Spartans received an invitation to the NIT for the second consecutive year. MSU beat George Washington in the first round and lost in the second round to Florida State.

== Roster and statistics ==
1996–97 Michigan State Spartans men's basketball team
Name	Class	Pos	Height	Summary
Mateen Cleaves	FR	G	6'2"	10.2 Pts, 2.5 Reb, 5.0 Ast
Monte Evans		G	5'10"	0.0 Pts, 0.0 Reb, 0.0 Ast
Jon Garavaglia	SR	F	6'9"	10.4 Pts, 5.9 Reb, 1.1 Ast
A. J. Granger	FR	F	6'9"	1.2 Pts, 1.3 Reb, 0.2 Ast
Thomas Kelley	JR	G	6'2"	5.1 Pts, 1.2 Reb, 1.3 Ast
Jason Klein	SO	F	6'7"	4.4 Pts, 2.0 Reb, 0.4 Ast
Anthony Mull	SR	G	6'4"	2.0 Pts, 1.2 Reb, 0.5 Ast
Morris Peterson	FR	F	6'7"	6.8 Pts, 3.3 Reb, 0.6 Ast
Steve Polonowski	SR	F	6'9"	2.8 Pts, 2.3 Reb, 0.4 Ast
Antonio Smith	SO	F	6'8"	8.5 Pts, 10.6 Reb, 1.5 Ast
David Thomas	FR	F		1.0 Pts, 1.8 Reb, 0.3 Ast
Ray Weathers	SR	G	6'3"	13.6 Pts, 2.4 Reb, 1.6 Ast
Jason Webber	FR	F	6'6"	1.4 Pts, 0.5 Reb, 0.2 Ast
Dujuan Wiley	JR	C		1.4 Pts, 1.4 Reb, 0.0 Ast

== Schedule and results ==
Date time, TV	Rank^{#}	Opponent^{#}	Result	Record	Site city, state
Exhibition
Nov 7, 1996		Russia Select Team	W 84–71		Breslin Center; East Lansing, MI
Nov 16, 1996		Marathon Basketball	L 68–69		Breslin Center; East Lansing, MI
Regular season
Nov 25, 1996*		East Tennessee State	W 83–45	1–0	Breslin Center; East Lansing, MI
Dec 3, 1996*		Cleveland State	W 83–78	2–0	Breslin Center; East Lansing, MI
Dec 5, 1996*		UIC	W 90–60	3–0	Breslin Center; East Lansing, MI
Dec 14, 1996*		at Detroit Mercy	L 84–86 ^{3OT}	3–1	Calihan Hall; Detroit, MI
Dec 17, 1996*		at Evansville	W 86–77	4–1	Roberts Municipal Stadium; Evansville, IN
Dec 21, 1996*		Kansas State	W 75–43	5–1	Breslin Center; East Lansing, MI
Dec 27, 1996*		Kent State; Oldsmobile Spartan Classic semifinals	W 83–64	6–1	Breslin Center; East Lansing, MI
Dec 28, 1996*		Weber State; Oldsmobile Spartan Classic championship	W 83–51	7–1	Breslin Center; East Lansing, MI
Jan 2, 1997; Creative Sports Local		at No. 12 Indiana	L 65–77	7–2 (0–1)	Assembly Hall; Bloomington, IN
Jan 4, 1997; Creative Sports Regional		No. 15 Minnesota	L 43–68	7–3 (0–2)	Breslin Center; East Lansing, MI
Jan 9, 1997; 2:30 pm, ESPN		at Wisconsin	W 58–50	8–3 (1–2)	Kohl Center; Madison, WI
Jan 11, 1997; Creative Sports Local		Ohio State	W 69–66	9–3 (2–2)	Breslin Center; East Lansing, MI
Jan 15, 1997; Creative Sports Local		at Penn State	W 85-69	10–3 (3–2)	Bryce Jordan Center; University Park, PA
Jan 18, 1997; Creative Sports Regional		Iowa	W 75–62	11–3 (4–2)	Breslin Center; East Lansing, MI
Jan 22, 1997; Creative Sports Local		Illinois	L 63–66	11–4 (4–3)	Breslin Center; East Lansing, MI
Jan 25, 1997*; Creative Sports Local		No. 13 Michigan; Rivalry (non-conference**)	L 62–85	11–5	Breslin Center; East Lansing, MI
Jan 29, 1997; Creative Sports Local		at Purdue	L 62–72	11–6 (4–4)	Mackey Arena; West Lafayette, IN
Feb 1, 1997; Creative Sports Regional		at No. 16 Michigan; Rivalry	L 65–85	11–7 (4–5)	Crisler Arena; Ann Arbor, MI
Feb 8, 1997; Creative Sports Regional		Purdue	L 62–77	11–8 (4–6)	Breslin Center; East Lansing, MI
Feb 12, 1997; Creative Sports Local		Iowa	W 69–67	12–8 (5–6)	Breslin Center; East Lansing, MI
Feb 15, 1997; Creative Sports Local		at No. 20 Illinois	L 68–79	12–9 (5–7)	Assembly Hall; Champaign, IL
Feb 19, 1997; Creative Sports Local		at Northwestern	L 58–70	12–10 (5–8)	Welsh–Ryan Arena; Evanston, IL
Feb 22, 1997; Creative Sports Local		Penn State	W 71–57	13–10 (6–8)	Breslin Center; East Lansing, MI
Feb 26, 1997; ESPN2		at Ohio State	W 67–65	14–10 (7–8)	St. John Arena; Columbus, OH
Mar 1, 1997; Creative Sports Local		Wisconsin	W 68–49	15–10 (8–8)	Breslin Center; East Lansing, MI
Mar 6, 1997; Creative Sports Local		at No. 2 Minnesota	L 74–81	15–11 (8–9)	Williams Arena; Minneapolis, MN
Mar 8, 1997; Creative Sports Local		No. 25 Indiana	W 63–60	16–11 (9–9)	Breslin Center; East Lansing, MI
NIT
Mar 12, 1998		George Washington	W 65–60	17–11	Breslin Center; East Lansing, MI
Mar 17, 1998		at Florida State	L 63–68	17–12	Donald L. Tucker Civic Center; Tallahassee, FL
*Non-conference game. ^{#}Rankings from AP Poll,. (#) Tournament seedings in parentheses. All times are in Eastern Time; **Michigan and Michigan State, who were only scheduled to play each other once in conference play, chose to play one game against each other that did not count as a conference game Source.
