= Fred Hissong =

United States Army general (1931–2024)

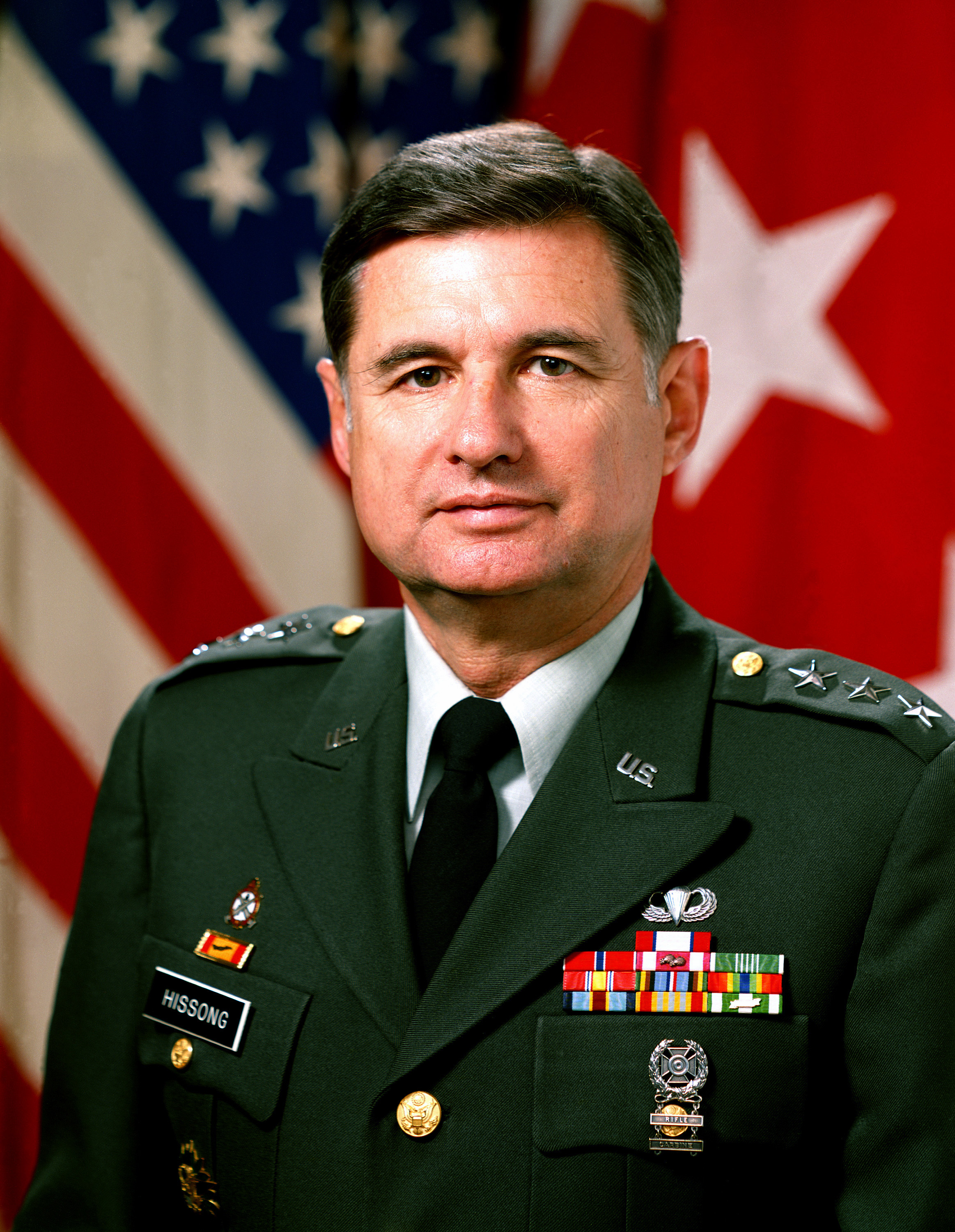
- Born: 22 September 1931; Benton Ridge, Ohio U.S.
- Died: 24 May 2024 (92); Findlay, Ohio, U.S.
- Military career
- Allegiance: United States
- Branch: United States Army
- Service years: 1954–1990
- Rank: Lieutenant general
- Commands: Deputy Commanding General, United States Army Materiel Command

Fred Hissong Jr. (September 22, 1931 – May 24, 2024) was an American lieutenant general in the United States Army. He served as deputy executive director for conventional ammunition and deputy commanding general of the United States Army Materiel Command.

Hissong is a 1950 graduate of Liberty Township High School. He is an alumnus of Ohio State University, having received a B.S. degree in personnel management and administration in 1954. Hissong later earned an M.B.A. degree in industrial management from Babson College.

Hissong died on May 24, 2024, at the age of 92.
