= A. J. Granger =

American basketball player (born 1978)

Personal information
- Born: April 24, 1978 (age 48) Findlay, Ohio, U.S.
- Listed height: 6 ft 9 in (2.06 m)
- Listed weight: 230 lb (104 kg)

Career information
- High school: Liberty-Benton (Findlay, Ohio)
- College: Michigan State (1996–2000)
- NBA draft: 2000: undrafted
- Playing career: 2000–2004
- Position: Forward

Career history
- 2000–2001: Milon B.C.
- 2001: Adecco Milano
- 2003–2004: Artland Dragons

Career highlights
- NCAA champion (2000)

Aaron Joseph Granger (born April 24, 1978) is an American former professional basketball player.

== College career ==
Granger attended Liberty-Benton High School in his hometown of Findlay, Ohio, where he won the Division IV basketball championship in 1995 and was an all-state selection in 1995 and 1996. As a junior he averaged 15 points per game, and as a senior he posted averages of 22 points, 9 rebounds and 3 assists per game. He also competed in track and field, and he was Ohio State Champion in discus throw in 1996.

He committed to Michigan State in 1996 and coach Tom Izzo played him consistently, giving him the starting nod in 7 games at the end of his freshman season. His sophomore year saw him play all 30 games, averaging 12 minutes per game as a reserve, and he averaged 2.6 points. He showed improvement in his shooting, especially his 3-point shooting: while he shot 0/1 in all his freshman season, he started to take more shots in his second year, attempting a total of 19 shots and scoring 5. The 3-point shooting became one of the characteristics of Granger's game. At the end of his sophomore year he received the Scholar-Athlete Award by his university, an award he would receive also in his senior season.

His junior year saw an increased playing time and a further improvement in his stats, and he recorded a 53.2 field goal percentage. He also shot significantly better from the free throw line, going from 59% in his sophomore year to 71% in his junior year. Granger averaged 6.6 points and shot 50% from the 3-point line (62.1% during the NCAA Tournament). His performances during the 1999 NCAA Tournament earned him a selection in the 1999 All-Midwest team.

Granger's senior season was his most successful: he was named team captain and became one of the main players of the Spartans team. His combination of size, post game and 3-point shooting made him hard to guard for the opposing teams, and despite starting the year as a reserve, he became a starter as the season progressed. He started 35 out of 39 games, and averaged 9.5 points and 5.3 rebounds for the season, shooting 89.3% from the free throw line and 45% from 3. In the 2000 championship game against Florida won by Michigan State he played 34 minutes, scoring 19 points (a career high) along with 9 rebounds and 1 assist. He was again selected in the NCAA All-Regional Team and he also was part of the NCAA All-Tournament Team. At the end of his career he was 4th in Michigan State history in 3-point field goal percentage with 44% of made shots.

=== College statistics ===
Year	Team	GP	GS	MPG	FG%	3P%	FT%	RPG	APG	SPG	BPG	PPG
1996–97	Michigan State	22	7	8.3	.344	.000	.455	1.3	0.2	0.4	0.0	1.2
1997–98	Michigan State	30	0	12.0	.405	.263	.591	1.8	0.5	0.6	0.3	2.6
1998–99	Michigan State	38	5	20.7	.532	.500	.714	3.9	0.6	0.6	0.4	6.6
1999–00	Michigan State	39	35	28.8	.500	.450	.893	5.3	1.2	0.4	0.5	9.5
Career		129	47	17.5	.488	.440	.760	3.4	0.7	0.5	0.5	5.6

== Professional career ==
At the end of his senior year, Granger was automatically eligible for the 2000 NBA draft. At the 2000 NBA Draft Combine He was measured at 6 ft 7.5 in without shoes, with an 8 ft 7 in standing reach, a 6 ft 9.5 in wingspan and weighted 227 lbs. He went undrafted and after briefly participating in a camp with the Vancouver Grizzlies, he signed for the Greek team Milon BC. In 20 games in the 2000–01 Greek Basket League he averaged 17.0 points, 7.1 rebounds and 1.3 assists.

He then transferred to Italy, where he signed for Adecco Milano. In 5 games played he averaged 12.2 points and 3.8 rebounds. In 2003 he joined Artland Dragons in Germany. During the 2003–04 season he averaged 14.1 points, 5.2 rebounds and 0.8 assists in 25 games played.
