= 1997 National Invitation Tournament =

Annual NCAA basketball competition

- Season: 1996–97
- Teams: 32
- Finals site: Madison Square Garden, New York City
- Champions: Michigan Wolverines (vacated) (2nd title)
- Runner-up: Florida State Seminoles (1st title game)
- Semifinalists: Connecticut Huskies (2nd semifinal); Arkansas Razorbacks (1st semifinal)
- Winning coach: Steve Fisher (1st title)
- MVP: Robert Traylor (vacated) (Michigan)

The 1997 National Invitation Tournament was the 1997 edition of the annual NCAA college basketball competition. Michigan's tournament victory was later vacated due to players Robert Traylor and Louis Bullock being ruled ineligible by the NCAA. Traylor also vacated his tournament Most Valuable Player award.

== Selected teams ==
Below is a list of the 32 teams selected for the tournament.

- Arkansas
- Bowling Green
- Bradley
- Connecticut
- Drexel
- Florida State
- Fresno State
- George Washington
- Hawaii
- Iona
- Memphis
- Miami (FL)
- Michigan
- Michigan State
- NC State
- Nebraska
- Nevada
- New Orleans
- Northern Arizona
- Notre Dame
- Oklahoma State
- Oral Roberts
- Oregon
- Pittsburgh
- Southwest Missouri State
- Syracuse
- TCU
- Tulane
- UAB
- UNLV
- Washington
- West Virginia

== Bracket ==
Below are the four first round brackets, along with the four-team championship bracket.

First Round
Michigan State	65
George Washington	50
Florida State	82
Syracuse	67
West Virginia	98
Bowling Green	95
NC State	77
SW Missouri State	66

Second Round
Michigan State	63
Florida State	68
West Virginia	76
NC State	73

Quarterfinals
Florida State	76
West Virginia	71

First Round
Nevada	97
Fresno State	86
Nebraska	67
Washington	63
Bradley	66
Drexel	53
Connecticut	71
Iona	66

Second Round
Nevada	68
Nebraska	78
Bradley	47
Connecticut	63

Quarterfinals
Nebraska	67
Connecticut	76

First Round
Michigan	76
Miami (FL)	63
Oklahoma State	79
Tulane	72
Notre Dame	74
Oral Roberts	58
TCU	85
UAB	62

Second Round
Michigan	75
Oklahoma State	65
Notre Dame	82
TCU	72

Quarterfinals
Michigan	67
Notre Dame	66

First Round
UNLV	66
Memphis	62
Hawaii	71
Oregon	61
Arkansas	101
Northern Arizona	75
Pittsburgh	82
New Orleans	63

Second Round
UNLV	89
Hawaii	80
Arkansas	76
Pittsburgh	71

Quarterfinals
UNLV	73
Arkansas	86

=== Semifinals & finals ===
Semifinals
Florida State	71
Connecticut	65
Michigan	77
Arkansas	62

Finals
Florida State	73
Michigan	82

Third place game
Connecticut	74
Arkansas	64

Michigan later forfeited its entire 1996–97 schedule after Robert Traylor, Maurice Taylor and Louis Bullock were found to have taken money from a Michigan booster.

== See also ==
- 1997 NCAA Division I men's basketball tournament
- 1997 NCAA Division II men's basketball tournament
- 1997 NCAA Division III men's basketball tournament
- 1997 NCAA Division I women's basketball tournament
- 1997 NAIA Division I men's basketball tournament
- 1997 NAIA Division II men's basketball tournament
