= NC State Wolfpack men's basketball statistical leaders =

The NC State Wolfpack men's basketball statistical leaders are individual statistical leaders of the NC State Wolfpack men's basketball program in various categories, including points, three-pointers, assists, blocks, rebounds, and steals. Within those areas, the lists identify single-game, single-season, and career leaders. The WolfPack represent the North Carolina State University in the NCAA's Atlantic Coast Conference.

NC State began competing in intercollegiate basketball in 1910. However, the school's record book does not generally list records from before the 1950s, as records from before this period are often incomplete and inconsistent. Since scoring was much lower in this era, and teams played much fewer games during a typical season, it is likely that few or no players from this era would appear on these lists anyway.

The NCAA did not officially record assists as a stat until the 1983–84 season, and blocks and steals until the 1985–86 season, but NC State's record books includes players in these stats before these seasons. These lists are updated through the end of the 2020–21 season.

== Scoring ==
Career
Rk	Player	Points	Seasons
1	Rodney Monroe	2,551	1987–88 1988–89 1989–90 1990–91
2	David Thompson	2,309	1972–73 1973–74 1974–75
3	Julius Hodge	2,040	2001–02 2002–03 2003–04 2004–05
4	Sammy Ranzino	1,967	1947–48 1948–49 1949–50 1950–51
5	Hawkeye Whitney	1,964	1976–77 1977–78 1978–79 1979–80
6	Kenny Carr	1,772	1974–75 1975–76 1976–77
7	Ronnie Shavlik	1,761	1953–54 1954–55 1955–56
8	Dick Dickey	1,644	1946–47 1947–48 1948–49 1949–50
9	Anthony Grundy	1,641	1998–99 1999–00 2000–01 2001–02
10	Tommy Burleson	1,598	1971–72 1972–73 1973–74

Season
Rk	Player	Points	Season
1	T. J. Warren	871	2013–14
2	David Thompson	838	1974–75
3	Rodney Monroe	836	1990–91
4	David Thompson	805	1973–74
5	Kenny Carr	798	1975–76
6	Cat Barber	776	2015–16
7	Vann Williford	710	1969–70
8	Ronnie Shavlik	707	1954–55
9	Sammy Ranzino	706	1950–51
10	Rodney Monroe	697	1989–90

Single game
Rk	Player	Points	Season	Opponent
1	David Thompson	57	1974–75	Buffalo St.
2	Ronnie Shavlik	55	1954–55	William & Mary
3	Ronnie Shavlik	49	1954–55	Villanova
4	Rodney Monroe	48	1990–91	Georgia Tech
5	Sammy Ranzino	47	1950–51	Virginia Tech
	Paul McNeil	47	2025–26	Texas Southern
7	Kenny Carr	45	1975–76	Duke
8	Kenny Carr	44	1975–76	Duke
9	Hawkeye Whitney	43	1978–79	Clemson
	David Thompson	43	1974–75	Davidson
	Ed Leftwich	43	1969–70	Atlantic Christian
	Sammy Ranzino	43	1950–51	Georgetown

== Rebounds ==
Career
Rk	Player	Rebounds	Seasons
1	Ronnie Shavlik	1,598	1953–54 1954–55 1955–56
2	Tommy Burleson	1,066	1971–72 1972–73 1973–74
3	Mel Thompson	1,063	1951–52 1952–53 1953–54
4	Bobby Speight	1,057	1950–51 1951–52 1952–53
5	Richard Howell	1,055	2009–10 2010–11 2011–12 2012–13
6	John Richter	936	1956–57 1957–58 1958–59
7	Todd Fuller	887	1992–93 1993–94 1994–95 1995–96
8	Kenny Inge	833	1997–98 1998–99 1999–00 2000–01
9	Tom Gugliotta	820	1988–89 1989–90 1990–91 1991–92
10	Kevin Thompson	815	1989–90 1990–91 1991–92 1992–93

Season
Rk	Player	Rebounds	Season
1	Ronnie Shavlik	581	1954–55
2	Ronnie Shavlik	545	1955–56
3	Ronnie Shavlik	472	1953–54
4	Paul Horvath	448	1950–51
5	Mel Thompson	397	1951–52
6	Richard Howell	380	2012–13
7	Tommy Burleson	377	1973–74
8	John Richter	370	1958–59
9	Tommy Burleson	365	1971–72
10	Bobby Speight	364	1951–52

Single game
Rk	Player	Rebounds	Season	Opponent
1	Ronnie Shavlik	35	1954–55	Villanova
2	Ronnie Shavlik	34	1955–56	So. Carolina
3	Ronnie Shavlik	29	1955–56	BYU
4	Ronnie Shavlik	28	1955–56	Clemson
	Ronnie Shavlik	28	1954–55	Virginia
6	Ronnie Shavlik	25	1955–56	Eastern Ky.
7	Tommy Burleson	24	1973–74	Providence
	Ronnie Shavlik	24	1955–56	No. Carolina
	Ronnie Shavlik	24	1955–56	So. Carolina
	Ronnie Shavlik	24	1955–56	Temple
	Ronnie Shavlik	24	1954–55	Furman
	Ronnie Shavlik	24	1954–55	Texas Tech
	Ronnie Shavlik	24	1953–54	Furman

== Assists ==
Career
Rk	Player	Assists	Seasons
1	Chris Corchiani	1,038	1987–88 1988–89 1989–90 1990–91
2	Sidney Lowe	762	1979–80 1980–81 1981–82 1982–83
3	Markell Johnson	607	2016–17 2017–18 2018–19 2019–20
4	Lorenzo Brown	589	2010–11 2011–12 2012–13
5	Clyde Austin	473	1976–77 1977–78 1978–79 1979–80
6	Julius Hodge	454	2001–02 2002–03 2003–04 2004–05
7	Ishua Benjamin	435	1994–95 1995–96 1996–97 1997–98
8	Curtis Marshall	430	1991–92 1992–93 1993–94 1995–96
9	Cat Barber	403	2013–14 2014–15 2015–16
10	Nate McMillan	402	1984–85 1985–86

Season
Rk	Player	Assists	Season
1	Chris Corchiani	299	1990–91
2	Sidney Lowe	271	1982–83
3	Chris Corchiani	266	1988–89
4	Lorenzo Brown	239	2012–13
5	Chris Corchiani	238	1989–90
6	Chris Corchiani	235	1987–88
7	Lorenzo Brown	234	2011–12
8	Nate McMillan	233	1985–86
9	Quadir Copeland	222	2025–26
10	Markell Johnson	210	2019–20

Single game
Rk	Player	Assists	Season	Opponent
1	Chris Corchiani	20	1990–91	Maryland
2	Spud Webb	18	1983–84	Northeastern
	Sidney Lowe	18	1982–83	Western Carolina
4	Quadir Copeland	16	2025-26	SMU
	Dennis Smith Jr.	16	2016–17	Rider
	Chris Corchiani	16	1989–90	Florida St.
	Chris Corchiani	16	1988–89	Alabama St.
	Chris Corchiani	16	1988–89	Akron
9	Dennis Smith Jr.	15	2016–17	Syracuse
	Ishua Benjamin	15	1997–98	Sam Houston St.
	Chris Corchiani	15	1989–90	UNC Asheville
	Chris Corchiani	15	1987–88	Georgia Tech
	Max Perry	15	1980–81	East Carolina

== Steals ==
Career
Rk	Player	Steals	Seasons
1	Chris Corchiani	328	1987–88 1988–89 1989–90 1990–91
2	Anthony Grundy	239	1998–99 1999–00 2000–01 2001–02
3	Sidney Lowe	220	1979–80 1980–81 1981–82 1982–83
4	Ishua Benjamin	195	1994–95 1995–96 1996–97 1997–98
5	Justin Gainey	190	1996–97 1997–98 1998–99 1999–00
6	Tom Gugliotta	173	1988–89 1989–90 1990–91 1991–92
7	Lorenzo Brown	172	2010–11 2011–12 2012–13
8	Clifford Crawford	167	1999–00 2000–01 2001–02 2002–03
9	Hawkeye Whitney	166	1976–77 1977–78 1978–79 1979–80
10	Markell Johnson	165	2016–17 2017–18 2018–19 2019–20

Season
Rk	Player	Steals	Season
1	Chris Corchiani	95	1989–90
2	Chris Corchiani	91	1990–91
3	Nate McMillan	90	1985–86
4	Sidney Lowe	87	1982–83
5	Chris Corchiani	81	1988–89
6	Anthony Grundy	70	2001–02
7	Anthony Grundy	69	1999–00
8	Lorenzo Brown	67	2011–12
9	Justin Gainey	66	1999–00
	Clifford Crawford	66	2002–03

Single game
Rk	Player	Steals	Season	Opponent
1	Mo Rivers	10	1973–74	Clemson
2	Justin Gainey	9	1999–00	Virginia
3	Lorenzo Brown	8	2011–12	UNC Asheville
	Quentin Jackson	8	1986–87	Maryland
5	Anthony Grundy	7	1999–00	Georgia
	Ishua Benjamin	7	1997–98	No. Carolina
	Jeremy Hyatt	7	1995–96	Wake Forest
	Chris Corchiani	7	1989–90	Maryland
	Chris Corchiani	7	1988–89	Duke
	Nate McMillan	7	1985–86	Clemson
	Nate McMillan	7	1985–86	Monmouth
	Spud Webb	7	1984–85	Duke
	Clyde Austin	7	1976–77	Duke
	Kenny Carr	7	1975–76	Duke
	Monte Towe	7	1973–74	Vermont

== Blocks ==
Career
Rk	Player	Blocks	Seasons
1	BeeJay Anya	243	2013–14 2014–15 2015–16 2016–17
2	Thurl Bailey	207	1979–80 1980–81 1981–82 1982–83
3	Kevin Thompson	150	1989–90 1990–91 1991–92 1992–93
4	Manny Bates	147	2019–20 2020–21 2021–22
5	Damon Thornton	146	1996–97 1997–98 1998–99 1999–00 2000–01
6	Todd Fuller	143	1992–93 1993–94 1994–95 1995–96
7	C.J. Leslie	136	2010–11 2011–12 2012–13
8	Cozell McQueen	121	1981–82 1982–83 1983–84 1984–85
9	Glenn Sudhop	117	1975–76 1976–77 1977–78 1978–79
10	Cedric Simmons	115	2004–05 2005–06

Season
Rk	Player	Blocks	Season
1	Thurl Bailey	95	1982–83
2	BeeJay Anya	91	2014–15
3	Manny Bates	83	2019–20
4	Cedric Simmons	80	2005–06
5	BeeJay Anya	73	2015–16
6	Manny Bates	64	2020–21
7	Chuck Nevitt	63	1981–82
8	Ömer Yurtseven	60	2017–18
9	Todd Fuller	56	1995–96
	Pano Fasoulas	56	1985–86

Single game
Rk	Player	Blocks	Season	Opponent
1	BeeJay Anya	10	2014–15	Jacksonville
	Todd Fuller	9	1994–95	William & Mary
	Thurl Bailey	9	1982–83	West Virginia
4	Manny Bates	8	2020–21	Saint Louis
	Pano Fasoulas	8	1985–86	Radford
	Tommy Burleson	8	1973–74	East Carolina
7	BeeJay Anya	7	2016–17	Tennessee State
	Avie Lester	7	1988–89	Iowa
	Chuck Nevitt	7	1981–82	St. Francis
	Tommy Burleson	7	1973–74	Marquette
	Phil Spence	7	1974–75	East Carolina
	Manny Bates	7	2019–20	Detroit Mercy
	Manny Bates	7	2020–21	North Carolina
