= Dixie Classic (basketball tournament) =

Defunct college basketball tournament

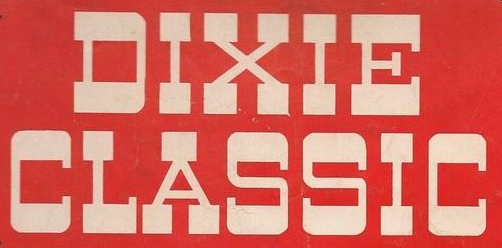
- Logo from the 1958 tournament program
- Sport: Basketball
- Founded: 1949
- Folded: 1960
- No. of teams: 8
- Country: United States
- Venue: William Neal Reynolds Coliseum
- Most titles: NC State (7)

The Dixie Classic was an annual college basketball tournament played from 1949 to 1960 in Reynolds Coliseum. The field consisted of the "Big Four" North Carolina schools, the host NC State Wolfpack, Duke Blue Devils, North Carolina Tar Heels, and Wake Forest Demon Deacons, and four teams from across the country.

North Carolina State head coach Everett Case originated the idea of the Classic. His assistant, Carl "Butter" Anderson provided the name. The tournament was played over a three-day period every December, just after Christmas, on North Carolina State's home court.

The Classic consisted of three rounds. In the first round the four North Carolina schools would each play a visiting team. The winners of the first-round game would advance in the winners' bracket and the losers would advance in the losers' bracket. Each day would have four games played until the third and final day when a champion would be crowned. No team from outside North Carolina ever won the Classic.

The tournament came to an end after a point-shaving scandal in 1961 involving players from both North Carolina State and North Carolina. The point-shaving scandal in question would ultimately be a part of the greater 1961 NCAA University Division men's basketball gambling scandal led by former NBA player Jack Molinas. The Big Four schools later participated in the Big Four Tournament from 1971 to 1981.

== Background and founding ==
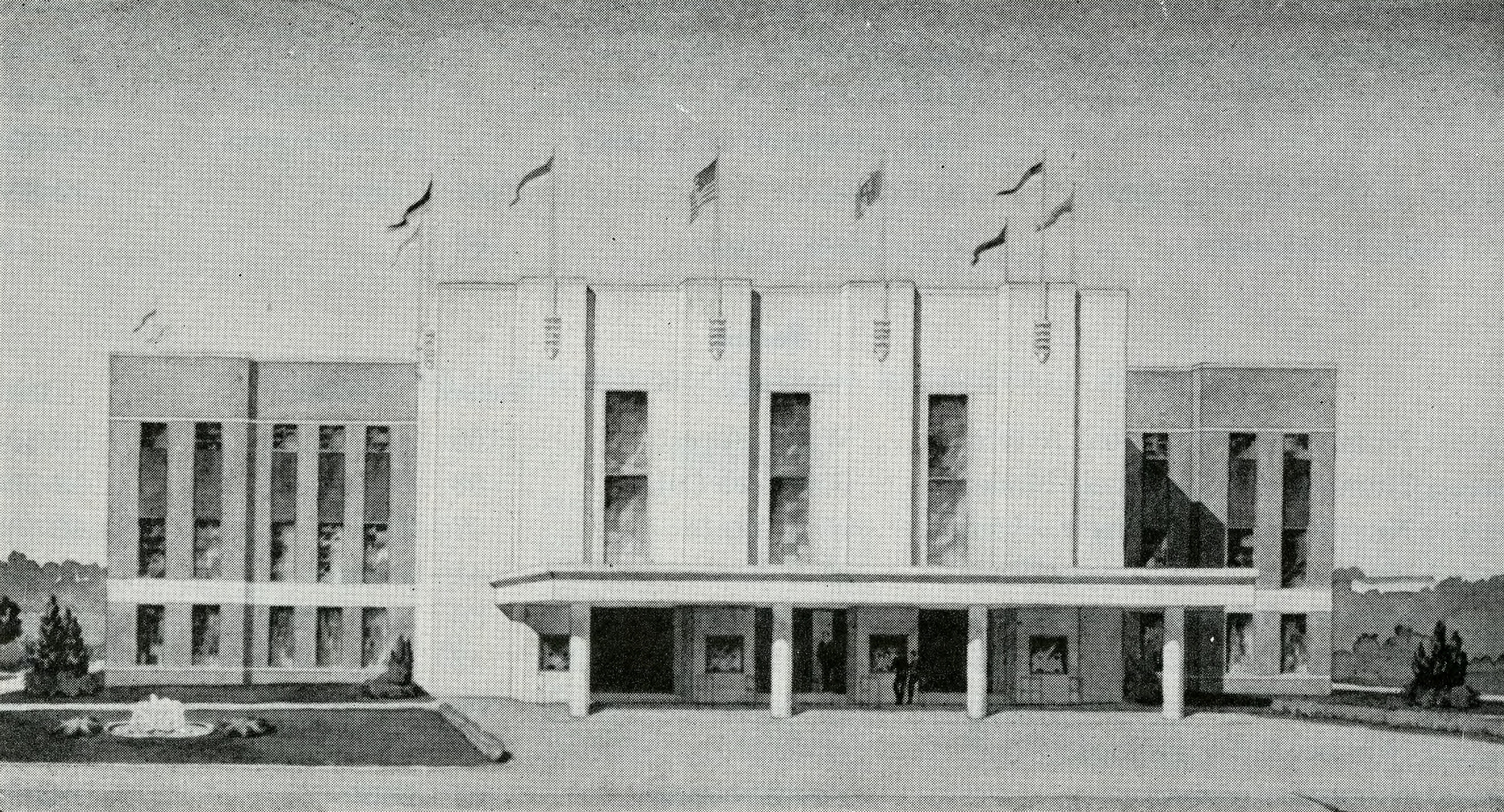
Reynolds Coliseum circa 1953

During the 1930s and 1940s, NC State had been outperformed by Duke and North Carolina in football. The school made a decision to improve its basketball program because it was cheaper to do so. Their first move was to build a new, larger basketball venue to replace Thompson Gym. Construction started in 1941, but the United States' involvement in World War II forced the construction's cessation. NC State's then athletic council H. A. Fisher sought advice on who to hire to coach NC State from Chuck Taylor, who stated: "The best basketball coach in the country is a lieutenant commander in the U.S. Navy. His name is Everett Case." Famed as a highly successful and innovative Indiana high school coach who had won multiple state titles, Case was hired after the war ended and first demanded that NCSU redesign the construction of their indoor arena. Case wanted the venue to be very large, larger than the recently constructed Duke Indoor Stadium. As the arena had a steel frame already built, to increase capacity, they extended the building lengthwise to have larger end zone seating sections behind the baskets. The 12,400 seat building was completed in 1949 and officially called William Neal Reynolds Coliseum.

As the coliseum was being finished, football in the state was immensely successful with Duke Blue Devils football coach Wallace Wade leading the Blue Devils to success, multi–position Charlie Justice at North Carolina, and Wake Forest coach Peahead Walker leading the team to bowl games. Football's regular season in 1949 came to an end on November 19, when the Tar Heels played the Blue Devils in front of a then state record crowd of 57,500. Weeks later, Case had planned for a basketball tournament to be held at Reynolds Coliseum across three days, with eight participants. The tournament was a joint idea between Case and The News and Observer writer Dick Herbert. The tournament was to be called the Dixie Classic, a name created by his assistant coach Carl "Butter" Anderson. Case desired to create the Christmas holiday tournament as he felt North Carolina was ignored in national sports coverage. The tournament would feature each of the four schools referred to as the Big Four or Tobacco Road: Duke University, North Carolina State College, (Note: North Carolina State University previously went by North Carolina State College until 1963, albeit briefly going by the longwinded name of North Carolina State of the University of North Carolina at Raleigh before simplifying it to the more common North Carolina State University in 1965.) University of North Carolina at Chapel Hill, (Note: The University of North Carolina at Chapel Hill was previously known as the University of North Carolina until February 1963.) and Wake Forest College. (Note: Wake Forest University previously went by Wake Forest College until 1967.) The remaining four entrants would be various talented teams from across the nation. Often the invited schools would be asked close to one or two years before the year of the tournament in question. In advance of the first edition, The News and Observer speculated that the event would increase statewide interest in basketball, along with showing how other areas teams play the sport.

== History ==
The first edition of the Dixie Classic brought Georgia Tech, Penn State, Rhode Island State College, and West Virginia, along with the Big Four.

=== Point–shaving scandal ===
As early as 1959, there were allegations of point shaving, but there was no evidence found. In 1961, an operation was discovered involving the tournament that could be traced back to gambling in New York City. On May 14, 1961, University of North Carolina system President William C. Friday was called to an emergency meeting in Chapel Hill, North Carolina with Wake County's district solicitor Lester Chalmers. At the meeting, it was disclosed that at least four NC State players, and possibly two North Carolina players, were involved in fixing games, including at least one game at the Dixie Classic. During the meeting, it was revealed that a gambler had pulled a gun on an NC State player when the fix did not go as planned. At the behest of President Friday and chancellors from both NC State and North Carolina, the Dixie Classic was cancelled after twelve years. In addition, sanctions were placed on the NC State and North Carolina basketball programs. The two teams also had reduced schedules for the 1961–62 seasons where they could play the fourteen conference games, but only two non–conference games instead of the standard nine. Other penalties included the prevention of players participating in summer basketball leagues and limiting the number of recruits from outside the Atlantic Coast Conference (ACC) territory to two. By 1962, the point shaving scandal could be traced through 50 players at 25 different schools involving at least 54 games as part of a larger gambling scheme across the NCAA University Division, orchestrated by Jack Molinas and other former college athletes. Four Wolfpack players and one Tar Heel were charged with bribery and then granted immunity in the Wake County Superior Court because they testified against the conspirators. In Durham County, the same players were tried and convicted, but given suspended sentences. Of the eight conspirators who paid players, six pleaded guilty in North Carolina to bribery and conspiracy before serving prison sentences, while two went to trial and were found guilty.

== Year by year ==
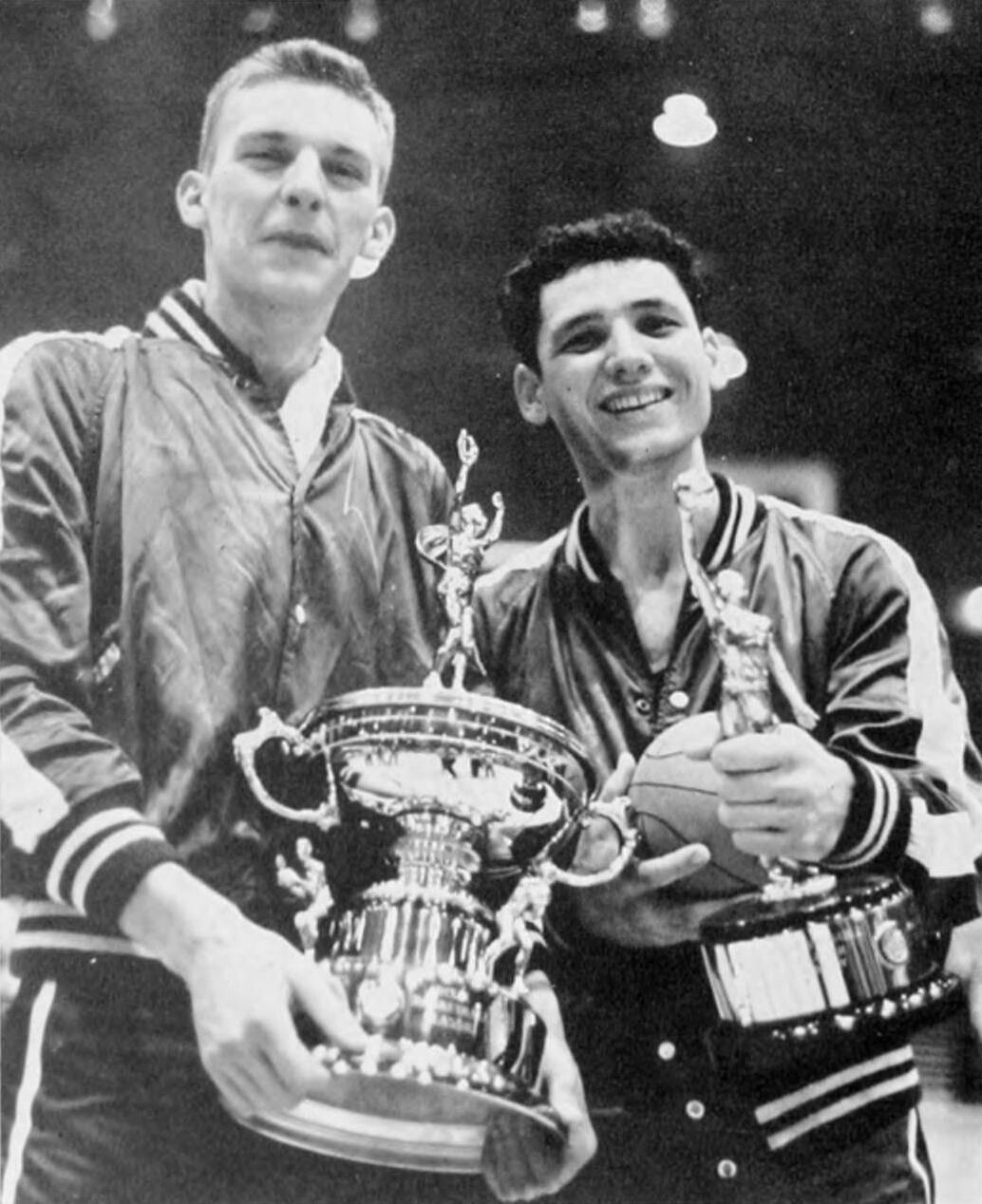
Bernie Janicki and Rudy D'Emilio of Duke with the Dixie Classic trophy (1953)

Year	Winner	Runner-up	Result	Most valuable player	Attendance
1949	NC State	Penn State	50–40	Dick Dickey (NC State)	54,400
1950	NC State (2)	Colgate	85–76	Sammy Ranzino (NC State)	54,200
1951	NC State (3)	Cornell	51–49	Lee Terrill (NC State)	
1952	NC State (4)	Brigham Young	75–59	Ernie Beck (Penn)	
1953	Duke	Navy	98–83	Rudy D'Emilio (Duke)	60,000
1954	NC State (5)	Minnesota	85–54	Ronnie Shavlik (NC State)	65,000
1955	NC State (6)	North Carolina	82–60	Ronnie Shavlik (NC State)	71,800
1956	North Carolina	Wake Forest	63–55	Lennie Rosenbluth (North Carolina)	71,200
1957	North Carolina (2)	NC State	39–30	Pete Brennan (North Carolina)	69,200
1958	NC State (7)	Michigan State	70–61	John Richter (NC State)	
1959	Wake Forest	North Carolina	53–50	Billy Packer (Wake Forest)	
1960	North Carolina (3)	Duke	76–71		

* All games played at Reynolds Coliseum, Raleigh, North Carolina.

== Aftermath ==
In our minds, we were dealing with protection of human life of an innocent college kid that, because he had exceptional skills, had gotten all his fame. Forces were preying upon these young men that were bigger than they could handle. You believe that threat to be real. That's what the difference was. I really did believe these [gamblers] would hurt these kids. That being said, you weren't left with any alternative."

— University of North Carolina system President William C. Friday reflecting on the scandal in 2010

The event had such an impact that people put tickets to the Dixie Classic into their will. Friday stated that "There was no Final Four in those days. It was our Final Four. There was enormous pressure on the thing from top to bottom." When interviewed close to 50 years later, Friday stated that the gun being pulled on a player still bothered him.
