= 1954 Dixie Classic =

Mid-season college basketball tournament

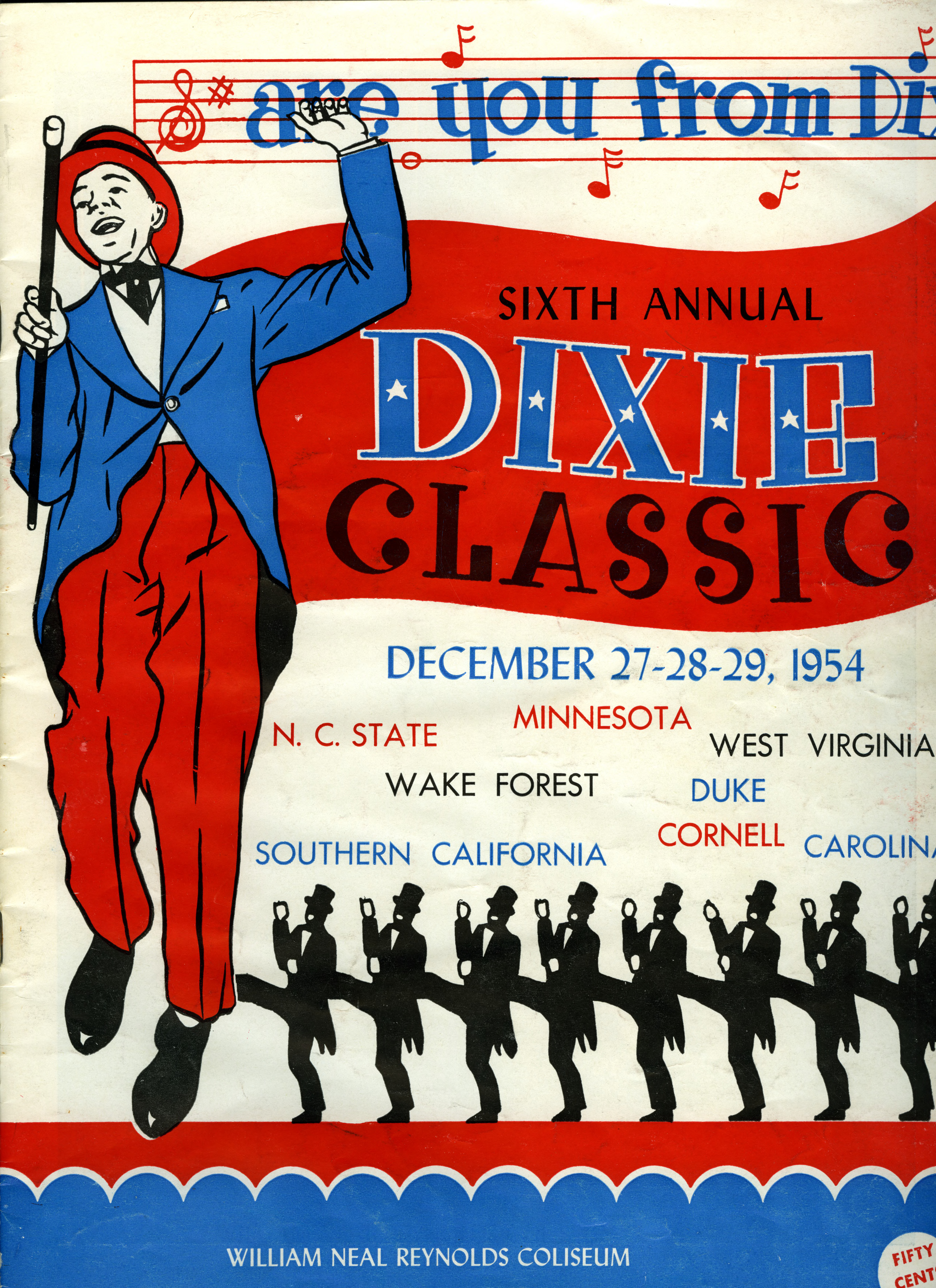
- Cover of the tournament program
- Season: 1954–55
- Teams: 8
- Finals site: Reynolds Coliseum; Raleigh, North Carolina
- Champions: NC State (5th title)
- Runner-up: Minnesota (1st title game)
- Winning coach: Everett Case (5th title)
- MVP: Ronnie Shavlik (NC State)
- Attendance: 65,000

The 1954 Dixie Classic was a mid-season college basketball tournament held December 27–29, 1954 at NC State's Reynolds Coliseum in Raleigh, North Carolina. It was the sixth iteration of the Dixie Classic and it was part of the 1954–55 NCAA men's basketball season.

Coming into the tournament, undefeated NC State and reigning champion Duke were considered favorites. The NC State Wolfpack won the final, defeating the Minnesota Golden Gophers 85–84.

Ronnie Shavlik of NC State was named most valuable player. Across the three days of six double-headers, the total attendance was 65,000.

== Teams ==
Each year, the Dixie Classic included the "Big Four" teams (Duke, NC State, North Carolina, and Wake Forest), as well as four other invited teams. The 1954 teams were:

- Southern California Trojans
- North Carolina Tar Heels
- Cornell Big Red
- NC State Wolfpack
- Minnesota Golden Gophers
- Wake Forest Demon Deacons
- West Virginia Mountaineers
- Duke Blue Devils

== Bracket ==
Consolation final
Dec. 29, 3:30pm
Southern California	85
Wake Forest	93
Seventh place
Dec. 29, 2:00pm
Cornell	71
West Virginia	79

Consolation semifinals
Dec. 28, 2:00pm
Southern California	77
Cornell	58
Dec. 28, 7:30pm
Wake Forest	96
West Virginia	94

Quarterfinals
Dec. 27, 2:00pm
Southern California	58
North Carolina	67
Dec. 27, 3:30pm
Cornell	61
NC State	95
Dec. 27, 7:30pm
Minnesota	81
Wake Forest	73
Dec. 27, 9:00pm
West Virginia	79
Duke	92

Semifinals
Dec. 28, 3:30pm
North Carolina	44
NC State	47
Dec. 28, 9:00pm
Minnesota	79
Duke	73

Final
Dec. 29, 9:00pm
NC State	85
Minnesota	84
Third place
Dec. 29, 7:30pm
North Carolina	65
Duke	52

== Game log ==
December 27
2:00pm

Southern California 58, North Carolina 67
Scoring by half: 22–31, 36–36
Pts: Welsh (15)	Pts: Rosenbluth (30)

No. 1
Attendance: 11,500

December 27
3:30pm

Cornell 61, NC State 95
Scoring by half: 32–44, 29–51
Pts: Dwyer (25)	Pts: Sheehy (28)

No. 2
Attendance: 11,500

December 27
7:30pm

Minnesota 81, Wake Forest 73
Scoring by half: 43–35, 38–38
Pts: Garmaker (30)	Pts: Hemric (21)

No. 3
Attendance: 12,000

December 27
9:00pm

West Virginia 79, Duke 92
Scoring by half: 31–49, 48–43
Pts: Witting (24)	Pts: Mayer (25)

No. 4
Attendance: 12,000

December 28
2:00pm

Southern California 77, Cornell 58
Scoring by half: 40–30, 37–28
Pts: Nagai (18)	Pts: Sheehy (26)

No. 5
Attendance: 11,000

December 28
3:30pm

North Carolina 44, NC State 47
Scoring by half: 18–20, 26–27
Pts: Rosenbluth (13)	Pts: Shavlik (10)

No. 6
Attendance: 11,000

December 28
7:30pm

Wake Forest 96, West Virginia 94
Scoring by half: 57–40, 39–54
Pts: Hemric (35)	Pts: Hundley (47)

No. 7
Attendance: 10,500

December 28
9:00pm

Minnesota 79, Duke 73
Scoring by half: 40–38, 39–35
Pts: Mencel (24)	Pts: Kalbfus (21)

No. 8
Attendance: 10,500

December 29
2:00pm

Cornell 71, West Virginia 79
Scoring by half: 39–39, 32–40
Pts: Sheehy (23)	Pts: Hundley (24)

No. 9
Attendance: 8,500

December 29
3:30pm

Southern California 85, Wake Forest 93
Scoring by half: 46–43, 39–50
Pts: Psaltis (22)	Pts: Hemric (30)

No. 10
Attendance: 8,500

December 29
7:30pm

North Carolina 65, Duke 52
Scoring by half: 20–24, 45–28
Pts: Rosenbluth (29)	Pts: Mayer (29)

No. 11
Attendance: 12,400

December 29
9:00pm

NC State 85, Minnesota 84
Scoring by half: 45–53, 40–31
Pts: Shavlik (32)	Pts: Garmaker, Simonovich (24)

No. 12
Attendance: 12,400
