= 1949 Dixie Classic =

Mid-season college basketball tournament

- Season: 1949–50
- Teams: 8
- Finals site: Reynolds Coliseum; Raleigh, North Carolina
- Champions: NC State (1st title)
- Runner-up: Penn State (1st title game)
- Winning coach: Everett Case (1st title)
- MVP: Dick Dickey (NC State)
- Attendance: 54,400

The 1949 Dixie Classic was a mid-season college basketball tournament held December 28–30, 1949 at NC State's Reynolds Coliseum in Raleigh, North Carolina. It was the first iteration of the Dixie Classic and it was part of the 1949–50 NCAA men's basketball season.

The championship game was contested by favorite NC State, who cruised to the final with double-digit wins over Rhode Island State and Georgia Tech, and underdog Penn State, who advanced with narrow upset wins over Duke and West Virginia. After initially struggling against Penn State's zone defense, NC State rallied back from a halftime deficit and won by a score of 50–40. Dick Dickey of NC State was voted most valuable player of the tournament.

== Teams ==
Each year, the Dixie Classic included the "Big Four" teams (Duke, NC State, North Carolina, and Wake Forest), as well as four other invited teams. The 1949 teams were:

- Wake Forest Demon Deacons
- Georgia Tech Yellow Jackets
- NC State Wolfpack
- Rhode Island State Rams
- North Carolina Tar Heels
- West Virginia Mountaineers
- Duke Blue Devils
- Penn State Nittany Lions

The first round pairings were decided by drawing names from a hat on September 5, 1949.

== Bracket ==
Consolation final
Dec. 30, 3:30pm
Rhode Island State | 65
North Carolina | 60
Seventh place
Dec. 30, 2:00pm
Wake Forest | 52
Duke | 54

Consolation semifinals
Dec. 29, 2:00pm
Wake Forest | 57
Rhode Island State | 61
Dec. 29, 7:30pm
North Carolina | 59
Duke | 52

Quarterfinals
Dec. 28, 2:00pm
Wake Forest | 57
Georgia Tech | 64
Dec. 28, 3:30pm
NC State | 81
Rhode Island State | 64
Dec. 28, 7:30pm
North Carolina | 50
West Virginia | 58
Dec. 28, 9:00pm
Duke | 48
Penn State | 51

Semifinals
Dec. 29, 3:30pm
Georgia Tech | 34
NC State | 57
Dec. 29, 9:00pm
West Virginia | 41
Penn State | 46

Final
Dec. 30, 9:00pm
NC State | 50
Penn State | 40
Third place
Dec. 30, 7:30pm
Georgia Tech | 63
West Virginia | 48

== Game log ==
December 28
2:00pm

Wake Forest 57, Georgia Tech 64
Scoring by half: 34–30, 23–34
| Pts: Mason (11) | Pts: Keener (16) |

No. 1

December 28
3:30pm

NC State 81, Rhode Island State 64
Scoring by half: 47–31, 34–33
| Pts: Ranzino (33) | Pts: Blount (17) |

No. 2

December 28
7:30pm

North Carolina 50, West Virginia 58
Scoring by half: 23–32, 27–26
| Pts: White (15) | Pts: Beach (15) |

No. 3

December 28
9:00pm

Duke 48, Penn State 51
Scoring by half: 22–22, 26–29
| Pts: Lamie (16) | Pts: Groat (18) |

No. 4

December 29
2:00pm

Wake Forest 57, Rhode Island State 61
Scoring by half: 30–36, 27–25
| Pts: McCotter, Bennett (12) | Pts: Blount (17) |

No. 5

December 29
3:30pm

Georgia Tech 34, NC State 57
Scoring by half: 21–33, 13–24
| Pts: Dold (8) | Pts: Ranzino (17) |

No. 6

December 29
7:30pm

North Carolina 59, Duke 52
Scoring by half: 22–27, 37–25
| Pts: Tsantes (19) | Pts: Groat (15) |

No. 7

December 29
9:00pm

West Virginia 41, Penn State 46
Scoring by half: 17–17, 24–29
| Pts: Beach (11) | Pts: Lamie (10) |

No. 8

December 30
2:00pm

Wake Forest 52, Duke 54
Scoring by half: 31–33, 21–21
| Pts: Mueller, Brooks (12) | Pts: Groat (17) |

No. 9

December 30
3:30pm

Rhode Island State 65, North Carolina 60 (OT)
Scoring by half: 26–27, 29–28 Overtime: 10–5
| Pts: Blount (19) | Pts: Kappler (14) |

No. 10

December 30
7:30pm

Georgia Tech 63, West Virginia 48
Scoring by half: 36–25, 27–23
| Pts: Cline, Sermersheim (15) | Pts: Workman (14) |

No. 11
Attendance: 11,700

December 30
9:00pm

NC State 50, Penn State 40
Scoring by half: 23–26, 27–14
| Pts: Dickey (14) | Pts: Schisler (9) |

No. 12
Attendance: 11,700
