= 1950 Dixie Classic =

Mid-season college basketball tournament

- Season: 1950–51
- Teams: 8
- Finals site: Reynolds Coliseum; Raleigh, North Carolina
- Champions: NC State (2nd title)
- Runner-up: Colgate (1st title game)
- Winning coach: Everett Case (2nd title)
- MVP: Sam Ranzino (NC State)
- Attendance: 54,200
- Top scorer: Dick Groat (Duke) (71 points)

The 1950 Dixie Classic was a mid-season college basketball tournament held December 28–30, 1950 at NC State's Reynolds Coliseum in Raleigh, North Carolina. It was the second iteration of the Dixie Classic and it was part of the 1950–51 NCAA men's basketball season.

Coming into the tournament, reigning champion NC State was the clear favorite, but undefeated Navy and 7–1 Duke were noted as possible dark horses. NC State defended their title, beating Colgate Raiders 85–76 in the final. In the consolation bracket final, Duke recovered from a 29-point deficit at halftime to beat Tulane 74–72.

NC State captain Sam Ranzino was voted most outstanding player of the tournament. Dick Groat of Duke led the tournament in scoring with 71 points, 32 of them coming in the final game. Across the three days of six double-headers, the total attendance was 54,200.

== Teams ==
Each year, the Dixie Classic included the "Big Four" teams (Duke, NC State, North Carolina, and Wake Forest), as well as four other invited teams. The 1950 teams were:

- Wake Forest Demon Deacons
- Rhode Island State Rams
- NC State Wolfpack
- Tulane Green Wave
- North Carolina Tar Heels
- Navy Midshipmen
- Duke Blue Devils
- Colgate Raiders

== Bracket ==
Consolation final
Dec. 30, 3:30pm
Tulane	72
Duke	74
Seventh place
Dec. 30, 2:00pm
Rhode Island State	93
North Carolina	69

Consolation semifinals
Dec. 29, 2:00pm
Rhode Island State	62
Tulane	81
Dec. 29, 7:30pm
North Carolina	63
Duke	71

Quarterfinals
Dec. 28, 2:00pm
Wake Forest	57
Rhode Island State	53
Dec. 28, 3:30pm
NC State	89
Tulane	75
Dec. 28, 7:30pm
North Carolina	49
Navy	60
Dec. 28, 9:00pm
Duke	69
Colgate	84

Semifinals
Dec. 29, 3:30pm
Wake Forest	56
NC State	72
Dec. 29, 9:00pm
Navy	59
Colgate	63

Final
Dec. 30, 9:00pm
NC State	85
Colgate	76
Third place
Dec. 30, 7:30pm
Wake Forest	46
Navy	66

== Game log ==
December 28
2:00pm

Wake Forest 57, Rhode Island State 53
Scoring by half: 24–31, 33–22
Pts: Najeway (15)	Pts: Stewart (17)

No. 1
Attendance: 10,000

December 28
3:30pm

NC State 89, Tulane 75
Scoring by half: 44–44, 45–31
Pts: Horvath (30)	Pts: Payton (19)

No. 2
Attendance: 10,000

December 28
7:30pm

North Carolina 49, Navy 60
Scoring by half: 30–34, 19–26
Pts: Schwartz, Grimaldi (10)	Pts: Corrigan (19)

No. 3
Attendance: 10,000

December 28
9:00pm

Duke 69, Colgate 84
Scoring by half: 37–40, 32–44
Pts: York (17)	Pts: Dodd (20)

No. 4
Attendance: 10,000

December 29
2:00pm

Rhode Island State 62, Tulane 81
Scoring by half: 36–50, 26–31
Pts: Stewart (23)	Pts: Payton (20)

No. 5

December 29
3:30pm

Wake Forest 56, NC State 72
Scoring by half: 23–36, 33–36
Pts: Brooks (14)	Pts: Ranzino (26)

No. 6

December 29
7:30pm

North Carolina 63, Duke 71
Scoring by half: 35–35, 28–36
Pts: Wallace (22)	Pts: Groat (23)

No. 7
Attendance: 8,000

December 29
9:00pm

Navy 59, Colgate 63
Scoring by half: 35–35, 24–28
Pts: Dodd (18)	Pts: Corrigan (16)

No. 8
Attendance: 8,000

December 30
2:00pm

Rhode Island State 93, North Carolina 69
Scoring by half: 43–29, 50–40
Pts: Lennen (19)	Pts: Grimaldi (22)

No. 9
Attendance: 5,000

December 30
3:30pm

Tulane 72, Duke 74
Scoring by half: 56–27, 16–47
Pts: Reed (22)	Pts: Groat (32)

No. 10
Attendance: 6,000

December 30
7:30pm

Wake Forest 46, Navy 66
Scoring by half: 30–35, 16–31
Pts: McCotter (16)	Pts: Wilson (17)

No. 11
Attendance: 12,000

December 30
9:00pm

NC State 85, Colgate 76
Scoring by half: 48–36, 37–40
Pts: Horvath (25)	Pts: Alton, Stacy (20)

No. 12
Attendance: 12,200
