= 1955 Dixie Classic =

Mid-season college basketball tournament

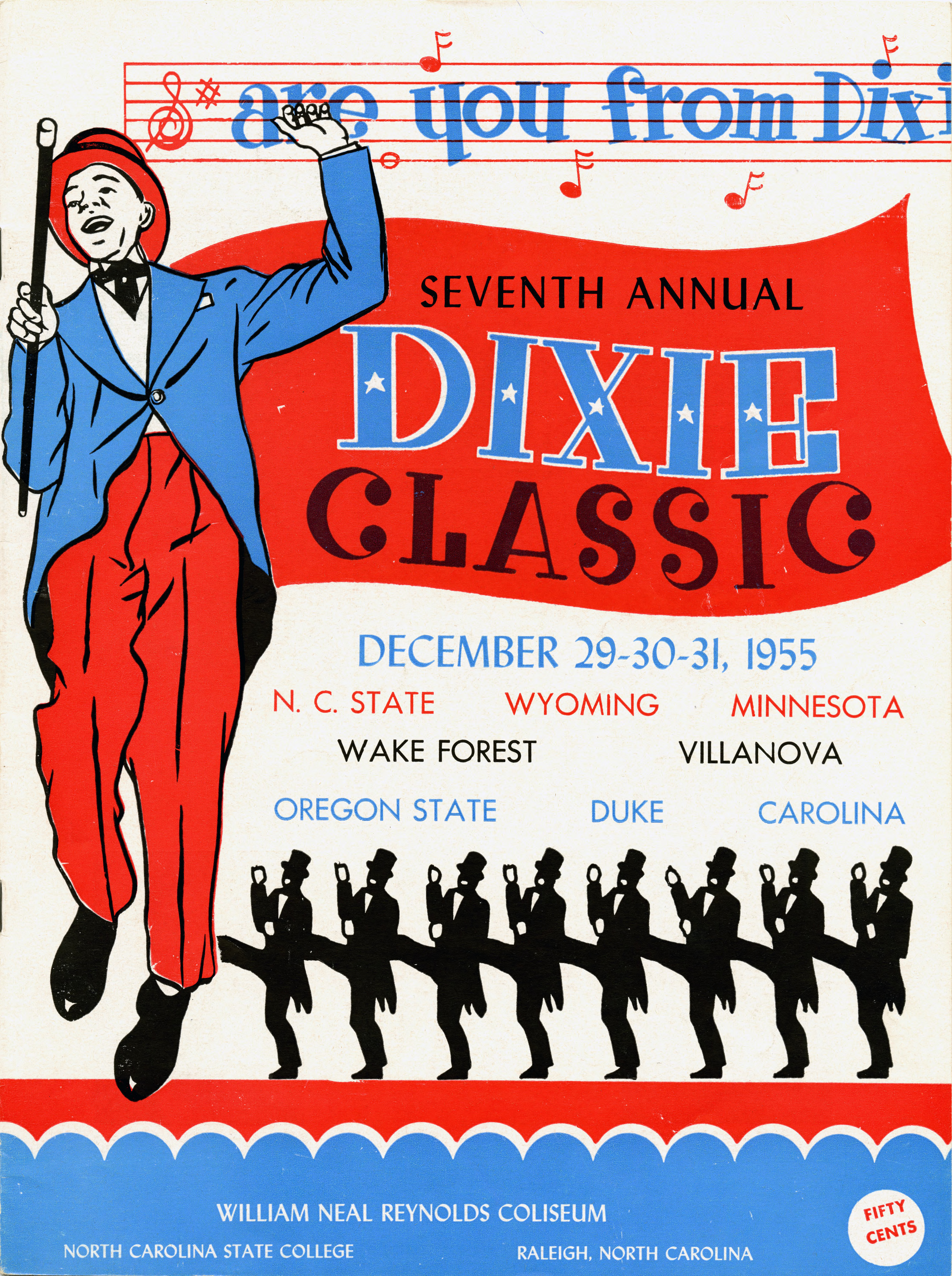
- Cover of the tournament program
- Season: 1955–56
- Teams: 8
- Finals site: Reynolds Coliseum; Raleigh, North Carolina
- Champions: NC State (6th title)
- Runner-up: North Carolina (1st title game)
- Winning coach: Everett Case (6th title)
- MVP: Ronnie Shavlik (NC State)
- Attendance: 71,800

The 1955 Dixie Classic was a mid-season college basketball tournament held December 29–31, 1955 at NC State's Reynolds Coliseum in Raleigh, North Carolina, United States. It was the seventh iteration of the Dixie Classic and it was part of the 1955–56 NCAA men's basketball season.

Second-ranked NC State entered the tournament as a clear favorite as the reigning champions who were so far undefeated in the season. NC State defeated North Carolina 82–60 in the final to win their sixth Dixie title.

Ronnie Shavlik of NC State was named the most valuable player of the tournament for the second year in a row. Across the three days of six double-headers, the total attendance was 71,800.

== Teams ==
Each year, the Dixie Classic included the "Big Four" teams (Duke, NC State, North Carolina, and Wake Forest), as well as four other invited teams. The 1955 teams were:

- Wake Forest Demon Deacons
- Minnesota Golden Gophers
- Oregon State Beavers
- NC State Wolfpack
- Duke Blue Devils
- Wyoming Cowboys
- Villanova Wildcats
- North Carolina Tar Heels

== Bracket ==
Consolation final
Dec. 31, 4:00pm
Minnesota	70
Wyoming	66
Seventh place
Dec. 31, 2:00pm
Oregon State	63
Villanova	68

Consolation semifinals
Dec. 30, 2:00pm
Minnesota	64
Oregon State	60
Dec. 30, 7:30pm
Wyoming	69
Villanova	68

Quarterfinals
Dec. 29, 2:00pm
Wake Forest	87
Minnesota	83
Dec. 29, 4:00pm
Oregon State	54
NC State	59
Dec. 29, 7:30pm
Duke	71
Wyoming	54
Dec. 29, 9:30pm
Villanova	63
North Carolina	86

Semifinals
Dec. 30, 4:00pm
Wake Forest	58
NC State	70
Dec. 30, 9:30pm
Duke	64
North Carolina	74

Final
Dec. 31, 9:30pm
NC State	82
North Carolina	60
Third place
Dec. 31, 7:30pm
Wake Forest	52
Duke	64

== Game log ==
December 29
2:00pm

Wake Forest 87, Minnesota 83
Scoring by half: 37–39, 50–44
Pts: Davis (27)	Pts: Tucker (17)

No. 1
Attendance: 12,400

December 29
4:00pm

Oregon State 54, NC State 59
Scoring by half: 21–34, 33–25
Pts: Nanson (19)	Pts: Shavlik (19)

No. 2
Attendance: 12,400

December 29
7:30pm

Duke 71, Wyoming 54
Scoring by half: 30–24, 41–30
Pts: Mayer (24)	Pts: Capua (15)

No. 3
Attendance: 12,400

December 29
9:30pm

Villanova 63, North Carolina 86
Scoring by half: 30–39, 33–47
Pts: Smith (17)	Pts: Rosenbluth (35)

No. 4
Attendance: 12,400

December 30
2:00pm

Minnesota 64, Oregon State 60
Scoring by half: 28–22, 36–38
Pts: Tucker (20)	Pts: Nanson (22)

No. 5
Attendance: 12,200

December 30
4:00pm

Wake Forest 58, NC State 70
Scoring by half: 23–38, 35–32
Pts: Murdock (16)	Pts: Hafer (20)

No. 6
Attendance: 12,200

December 30
7:30pm

Wyoming 69, Villanova 68
Scoring by half: 38–36, 31–32
Pts: Sharp (16)	Pts: Fahey (18)

No. 7
Attendance: 12,400

December 30
9:30pm

Duke 64, North Carolina 74
Scoring by half: 35–27, 29–47
Pts: Belmont (24)	Pts: Rosenbluth (19)

No. 8
Attendance: 12,400

December 31
2:00pm

Oregon State 63, Villanova 68
Scoring by half: 29–31, 34–37
Pts: Gambee (32)	Pts: Weissman, Fahey (20)

No. 9
Attendance: 10,000

December 31
4:00pm

Minnesota 70, Wyoming 66
Scoring by half: 39–40, 31–26
Pts: Lindsly (29)	Pts: Cupua (26)

No. 10
Attendance: 10,000

December 31
7:30pm

Wake Forest 52, Duke 64
Scoring by half: 24–25, 28–39
Pts: Davis (28)	Pts: Belmont (23)

No. 11
Attendance: 12,400

December 31
9:30pm

NC State 82, North Carolina 60
Scoring by half: 46–31, 36–29
Pts: Molodet (21)	Pts: Rosenbluth (19)

No. 12
Attendance: 12,400
