= 1957 Dixie Classic =

Mid-season college basketball tournament

- Season: 1957–58
- Teams: 8
- Finals site: Reynolds Coliseum; Raleigh, North Carolina
- Champions: North Carolina (2nd title)
- Runner-up: NC State (7th title game)
- Winning coach: Frank McGuire (2nd title)
- MVP: Pete Brennan (North Carolina)
- Attendance: 69,200

The 1957 Dixie Classic was a mid-season college basketball tournament held December 26–28, 1957 at NC State's Reynolds Coliseum in Raleigh, North Carolina. It was the ninth iteration of the Dixie Classic, and it was part of the 1957–58 NCAA University Division men's basketball season.

Coming into the tournament, the clear favorite to win the tournament was North Carolina, the reigning champions with a 5–1 record so far in the season. For the third consecutive year, the Big Four teams swept their first round opponents. In a slow-paced final, North Carolina defeated NC State 39–30. In the third-place matchup, Duke's Bobby Vernon scored all 14 of his team's points in overtime to pull out a 79–75 victory over Wake Forest.

Pete Brennan of North Carolina was voted most valuable player, having tallied 53 points and 28 rebounds in the Tar Heels' three wins. Across the three days of six double-headers, the total attendance was 69,200.

== Teams ==
Each year, the Dixie Classic included the "Big Four" teams (Duke, NC State, North Carolina, and Wake Forest), as well as four other invited teams. The 1957 teams were:

- Wake Forest Demon Deacons
- Duquesne Dukes
- NC State Wolfpack
- Northwestern Wildcats
- North Carolina Tar Heels
- St. Louis Billikens
- Duke Blue Devils
- Seton Hall Pirates

== Bracket ==
Consolation final
Dec. 28, 4:00pm
Northwestern	66
St. Louis	53
Seventh place
Dec. 28, 2:00pm
Duquesne	68
Seton Hall	65

Consolation semifinals
Dec. 27, 2:00pm
Duquesne	70
Northwestern	80
Dec. 27, 7:30pm
St. Louis	77
Seton Hall	44

Quarterfinals
Dec. 26, 2:00pm
Wake Forest	64
Duquesne	54
Dec. 26, 4:00pm
NC State	71
Northwestern	68
Dec. 26, 7:30pm
North Carolina	63
St. Louis	48
Dec. 26, 9:30pm
Duke	69
Seton Hall	62

Semifinals
Dec. 27, 4:00pm
Wake Forest	61
NC State	63
Dec. 27, 9:30pm
North Carolina	76
Duke	62

Final
Dec. 28, 9:30pm
NC State	30
North Carolina	39
Third place
Dec. 28, 7:30pm
Wake Forest	75
Duke	79

== Game log ==
December 26
2:00pm

Wake Forest 64, Duquesne 54
Scoring by half: 25–23, 39–31
Pts: Budd (25)	Pts: Binder, Matthews, Depalma (12)

No. 1
Attendance: 12,200

December 26
4:00pm

NC State 71, Northwestern 68
Scoring by half: 35–32, 36–36
Pts: Bell (23)	Pts: Warren (20)

No. 2
Attendance: 12,200

December 26
7:30pm

North Carolina 63, St. Louis 48
Scoring by half: 31–25, 32–23
Pts: Kearns (23)	Pts: Mimlitz (20)

No. 3
Attendance: 12,400

December 26
9:30pm

Duke 69, Seton Hall 62
Scoring by half: 26–32, 43–29
Pts: Allen (23)	Pts: Cross, Roberts (13)

No. 4
Attendance: 12,400

December 27
2:00pm

Duquesne 70, Northwestern 80
Scoring by half: 33–37, 37–43
Pts: Brown (15)	Pts: Ruklick (19)

No. 5
Attendance: 12,400

December 27
4:00pm

Wake Forest 61, NC State 63
Scoring by half: 33–40, 28–23
Pts: Ritchie (20)	Pts: Pucillo (16)

No. 6
Attendance: 12,400

December 27
7:30pm

St. Louis 77, Seton Hall 44
Scoring by half: 34–14, 43–33
Pts: Ferry (17)	Pts: Roberts (13)

No. 7
Attendance: 12,400

December 27
9:30pm

North Carolina 76, Duke 62
Scoring by half: 36–38, 40–24
Pts: Brennan (27)	Pts: Allen (15)

No. 8
Attendance: 12,400

December 28
2:00pm

Duquesne 68, Seton Hall 65
Scoring by half: 28–33, 40–32
Pts: Matthews (19)	Pts: Roberts (24)

No. 9
Attendance: 7,400

December 28
4:00pm

Northwestern 66, St. Louis 53
Scoring by half: 25–25, 41–28
Pts: Ruklick (16)	Pts: Mimlitz (12)

No. 10
Attendance: 7,400

December 28
7:30pm

Wake Forest 75, Duke 79 (OT)
Scoring by half: 35–32, 30–33 Overtime: 10–14
Pts: Ritchie (23)	Pts: Vernon (28)

No. 11
Attendance: 12,400

December 28
9:30pm

NC State 30, North Carolina 39
Scoring by half: 12–16, 18–23
Pts: Pucillo (12)	Pts: Kearns (14)

No. 12
Attendance: 12,400
