= NC State Athletic Hall of Fame =

- Established: 2012
- Location: 2411 Dunn Ave; Raleigh, North Carolina, United States
- Coordinates: 35.783424200639°N 78.66996332085°W
- Type: Hall of fame
- Director: David Beams (2015 – )
- Website: Official website

The NC State Athletic Hall of Fame is a sports history museum located in Reynolds Coliseum in Raleigh, North Carolina, U.S. The museum pays tribute to the most legendary and influential NC State Wolfpack sports heroes. Although the inaugural class of inductees were announced in 2012 the museum area opened in October 2016.

== Exhibits ==
The NC State Athletic Hall of Fame is home to many major trophies and awards. Exhibits highlight the history and significance of famous Wolfpack players, coaches, and teams. Special exhibits are on display for the most recent inductees.

== Inductees ==
Athletes:

- Joan Benoit, Women's Cross Country and Track and Field, ‘18
- Genia Beasley, Women's Basketball, ‘12
- Ted Brown, Football, ‘12
- Thori Staples Bryan, Women's Soccer, ‘20
- Tommy Burleson, Basketball, ‘13
- Dennis Byrd, Football, ‘14
- Mike Caldwell, Baseball, ‘13
- Dick Christy, Football, ‘16
- Bradley Chubb, Football, '24
- Tim Clark, Men's Golf, ‘18
- Stan Cockerton, Men's Lacrosse, ‘20
- Richard Dickey, Men's Basketball, ‘14
- David Fox, Men's Swimming and Diving, ‘20
- Roman Gabriel, Football, ‘12
- Betty Jo Geiger, Cross Country and Track and Field, ‘13
- Steve Gregg, Swimming and Diving, ‘13
- Beth Harrell, Swimming and Diving, '24
- Henry Gutierrez, Men's Soccer, ‘20
- Irwin Holmes, Men's Tennis and Track and Field, ‘20
- Torry Holt, Football, ‘13
- Charmaine Hooper, Women's Soccer, ‘14
- Cullen Jones, Men's Swimming and Diving, ‘18
- Trudi Lacey, Women's Basketball, ‘18
- Jack McDowall, Football, Baseball, Men's Basketball, Track and Field, ‘14
- Chasity Melvin, Women's Basketball, ‘14
- Vic Molodet, Men's Basketball, '24
- Rodney Monroe, Men's Basketball, ‘18
- Sam Okpodu, Men's Soccer '24
- Linda Page, Women's Basketball, ‘16
- Danny Peebles, Football, Track and Field, ‘14
- Lou Pucillo, Men's Basketball, ‘14
- Tab Ramos, Men's Soccer, ‘12
- Stephen Rerych, Men's Swimming and Diving, ‘14
- Jim Ritcher, Football, ‘12
- Philip Rivers, Football, ‘13
- Dave Robertson, Football, Baseball, Men's Basketball, Track and Field, ‘16
- John Sadri, Men's Tennis, ‘20
- Ronnie Shavlik, Men's Basketball, ‘13
- Julie Shea, Track and Field and Cross Country, ‘12
- Andrea Stinson, Women's Basketball, ‘13
- Sylvester Terkay, Wrestling, ‘13
- David Thompson, Men's Basketball, ‘12
- Volire Tisdale Brown, Volleyball '24
- Trena Trice-Hill Women's Basketball '24
- Mario Williams, Football, ‘20

Coaches:

- Everett Case, Men's Basketball, ‘12
- Willis Casey, Men's Swimming and Diving, ‘18
- Don Easterling, Swimming and Diving, ‘16
- Earle Edwards, Football, ‘13
- Sammy Esposito, Baseball, ‘14
- Rollie Geiger, Cross Country and Track and Field, '24
- Norm Sloan, Men's Basketball, ‘13
- Jim Valvano, Men's Basketball, ‘12
- Kay Yow, Women's Basketball, ‘12

Teams:

- 1974 Men's Basketball Team, ‘16
- 1983 Men's Basketball Team, ‘18

Special Contributor:

- Wendell Murphy, ‘14
