= Bobby Speight =

American basketball player and businessman

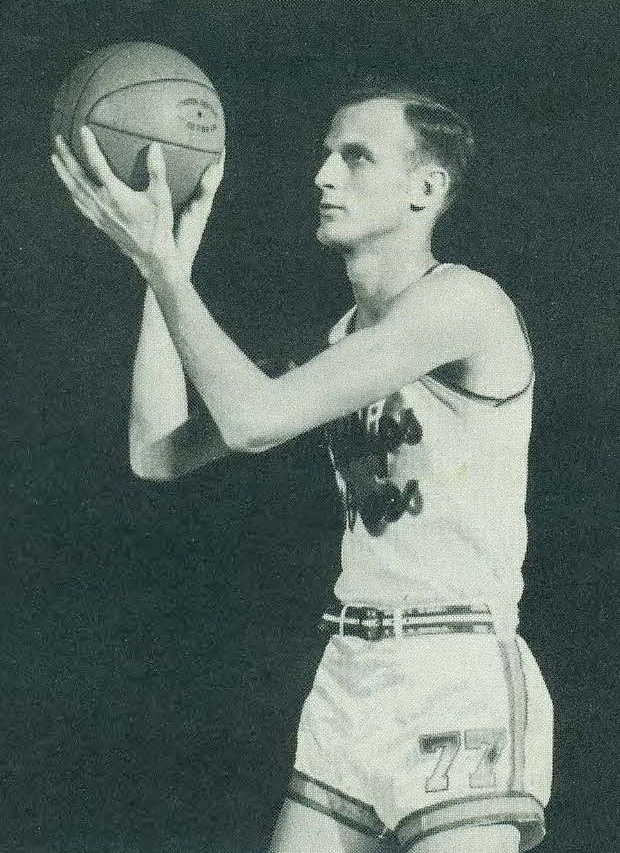
- Speight with the Phillips 66ers c. 1953

Personal information
- Born: October 7, 1930
- Died: March 1, 2007 (aged 76) Richmond, Virginia, U.S.
- Listed height: 6 ft 7 in (2.01 m)
- Listed weight: 185 lb (84 kg)

Career information
- College: NC State (1950–1953)
- NBA draft: 1953: undrafted
- Position: Forward
- Number: 80

Career highlights
- Second-team All-American – Collier's (1953); Third-team All-American – AP (1953); 2× All-SoCon (1952, 1953); No. 80 jersey honored by NC State Wolfpack
- Stats at Basketball Reference

Robert Wilton Speight Sr. (October 7, 1930 – March 1, 2007) was an American college basketball player and businessman.

A native of Raleigh, North Carolina, Speight played college basketball at NC State. He played 1950–51 to 1952–53 under the future-Hall of Famer Everett Case. During Speight's three-year varsity career he scored 1,430 points and grabbed 1,057 rebounds, and his rebound total still ranks fourth all-time. He was named an NCAA All-American in his senior year and was then drafted by the Baltimore Bullets in the 1953 NBA draft, although he ultimately never played a game in the league. For two years after college Speight played basketball for the Phillips 66ers of the Amateur Athletic Union (AAU), which was then an alternative to the National Basketball Association (NBA).

He joined the United States Army and served at Fort Bliss, where he became a first lieutenant. After his military service he co-founded the trucking company E&S Contract Carrier which he worked for up until his retirement in 2006. Speight died of cancer on March 1, 2007.
