= Big Four Tournament =

American college basketball tournament

- Sport: Basketball
- Founded: 1971
- Folded: 1981
- No. of teams: 4
- Country: United States
- Most titles: Wake Forest (4)

The Big Four Tournament was an annual college basketball tournament played from 1971 to 1981 in Greensboro, North Carolina. The field consisted of the "Big Four" North Carolina Atlantic Coast Conference schools: NC State Wolfpack, Duke Blue Devils, North Carolina Tar Heels, and Wake Forest Demon Deacons. The four previously participated in the Dixie Classic from 1949–1960.

The tournament was held in December, before the holiday season started, and consisted of two rounds. Each team would play one other team. The two winners then played for the championship and the two losers would play for third place. The games did not count in the ACC standings, but did count on a team's overall seasonal record, as did their team and individual stats.

The tournament came to an end in 1981, when participating schools and their coaches decided that the extra competition, aggravation of playing top conference rivals a third time each season, and the toll of all but one team getting one or more losses on its record so early in the season, outweighed their share of the gate and media revenues, substantial fan interest, and the chance to test themselves against the best in the ACC without the outcome affecting their conference records.

== Games ==
Years	Round	Winner	Loser	Score
1970–71	First	Wake Forest	Duke	83–77
1970–71	First	NC State	North Carolina	82–70
1970–71	Third Place	North Carolina	Duke	83–81
1970–71	Championship	NC State	Wake Forest	73–70
1971–72	First	NC State	Duke	67–62
1971–72	First	North Carolina	Wake Forest	99–76
1971–72	Third Place	Duke	Wake Forest	70–58
1971–72	Championship	North Carolina	NC State	99–68
1972–73	First	North Carolina	Duke	91–86
1972–73	First	NC State	Wake Forest	88–83
1972–73	Third Place	Duke	Wake Forest	80–67
1972–73	Championship	NC State	North Carolina	68–61
1973–74	First	Wake Forest	Duke	64–61
1973–74	First	NC State	North Carolina	78–77
1973–74	Third Place	North Carolina	Duke	84–75
1973–74	Championship	NC State	Wake Forest	91–73
1974–75	First	Duke	North Carolina	99–96 OT
1974–75	First	Wake Forest	NC State	83–78
1974–75	Third Place	NC State	North Carolina	82–67
1974–75	Championship	Wake Forest	Duke	75–71
1975–76	First	NC State	Duke	104–95
1975–76	First	Wake Forest	North Carolina	95–88
1975–76	Third Place	North Carolina	Duke	77–74
1975–76	Championship	Wake Forest	NC State	93–78
1976–77	First	Wake Forest	Duke	81–80
1976–77	First	North Carolina	NC State	78–66
1976–77	Third Place	Duke	NC State	84–82
1976–77	Championship	Wake Forest	North Carolina	97–96
1977–78	First	North Carolina	Duke	79–66
1977–78	First	NC State	Wake Forest	79–77
1977–78	Third Place	Duke	Wake Forest	97–84
1977–78	Championship	North Carolina	NC State	87–82
1978–79	First	Duke	NC State	65–63
1978–79	First	North Carolina	Wake Forest	73–55
1978–79	Third Place	NC State	Wake Forest	77–70
1978–79	Championship	Duke	North Carolina	78–68
1979–80	First	Duke	Wake Forest	72–70
1979–80	First	North Carolina	NC State	97–84
1979–80	Third Place	NC State	Wake Forest	70–65
1979–80	Championship	Duke	North Carolina	86–74
1980–81	First	North Carolina	Duke	78–76
1980–81	First	Wake Forest	NC State	87–57
1980–81	Third Place	NC State	Duke	74–60
1980–81	Championship	Wake Forest	North Carolina	82–71

== Championships ==
Team	Championships	Record
Wake Forest	4	10–12
NC State	3	13–9
North Carolina	2	12–10
Duke	2	9–13

- All games played at Greensboro Coliseum, Greensboro, North Carolina.
