= Linda Page =

American former basketball player

Personal information
- Born: February 24, 1963 Brooklyn, New York, U.S.
- Died: October 3, 2011 (aged 48)

Career information
- High school: Dobbins Technical School (Philadelphia, Pennsylvanie)
- College: NC State Wolfpack women's basketball (1982–1985)

Career highlights
- As player: ACC Tournament co-MVP (1983)

Linda Page (February 24, 1963 – October 3, 2011) was an American basketball player who spent her career in Spain and Sweden. Before going outside of the United States, Page had more than 2,380 overall points while at Dobbins Technical School during the 1980s. At Dobbins, she broke multiple records held by Wilt Chamberlain. With the NC State Wolfpack women's basketball team, Page held season records for the school and the Atlantic Coast Conference between 1982 and 1985. During this time period, Page was named Most Valuable Player several times while she accumulated 2307 points.

Outside of her playing career, Page worked in law between the 1990s and 2000s. She primarily worked in probation and with at-risk students while also briefly working in bail. During the early to mid-2000s, Page was a basketball coach at Dobbins. NC State retired Page's number in 2000 before Page was named into the Philadelphia Sports Hall of Fame in 2013.

== Early life and education ==
=== Early career ===
Page was born on February 24, 1963, and lived with her family in Philadelphia. Page was in middle school when she began her basketball experience. At the time, she competed against boys during her basketball matches. Outside of school, Page practiced basketball in her house's driveway. She used waste containers for baskets and a bouncy ball as an improvised basketball. Growing up, Page was interested in psychology and was a Burger King employee while in high school.

=== High school ===
During her basketball career, Page competed at the AAU Junior Olympic National Championships in girls basketball for competitors between the ages of 13 and 15 in 1979. Page held multiple records for Dobbins Technical High School by 1980. While playing with Dobbins Tech, Page scored 100 points in a February 1981 game and surpassed 2,000 career points. Her 100 points in the 1981 game broke the 1955 record made by Wilt Chamberlain for the most points scored in a Philadelphia Public League basketball match.

In March 1981, Page surpassed Chamberlain's record for the most points scored by a high school basketball player in Philadelphia. That month, Page and Dobbins reached the final of the 1981 Public League basketball tournament. At the end of her time with Dobbins Tech, Page had accumulated over 2,380 overall points. By the time she had finished high school, Page had expanded to softball and volleyball. As part of the girls softball team, Page and Dobbins qualified for the semifinals of the 1979 Public League championship.

=== College basketball ===
Between 1982 and 1985, Page was part of the NC State Wolfpack women's basketball team. Apart from basketball, Page studied criminal justice. During this time period, Page had the 1985 NCAA Division I season record for free throw percentage. As part of the Atlantic Coast Conference, Page held the season record for points per game three times and free throw percentage two times between 1983 and 1985.

For the ACC, Page was named one of the Most Valuable Players at the 1983 ACC women's basketball tournament. In 1985, her team won the ACC final. At NCAA tournaments, Page and her team reached the semifinal of their region in 1984 and 1985. With NC State, Page was the Most Valuable Player consecutively between 1983 and 1985.

In ACC career records, Page was in the top ten for most field goals and points during the early 2020s. Page held multiple season records for NC State from 1983 to 1985, which included the scoring average three times. She had 2307 points at the end of her time with NC State. She was also a 1984 finalist for the Wade Trophy.

== Career ==
At the U.S. Olympic Festival, Page and her basketball team won silver in 1981 and gold in 1982. She did not receive a spot on the United States women's national basketball team for the 1983 Pan American Games and the 1984 Summer Olympics. In 1985, Page was one of the first women that the Harlem Globetrotters considered to join their men's basketball team.

Outside of the United States, Page went to Spain and Sweden for her basketball career. By the early 1990s, Page had stopped playing basketball to start a career in law. She briefly worked in bail before going to work in probation for youth. In 2003, Page became the head coach for Dobbins for their girls team. She continued to hold her coaching position leading to the mid-2000s. During this time period, Page held basketball training sessions while also working with at-risk students.

== Awards and honors ==
Page was selected by the Philadelphia Inquirer as their Athlete of the Year in 1981. In 2000, North Carolina State retired Page's number. Page was selected as part of Anniversary teams for the ACC's silver and 50th years in 2002. In 2008, Page became an ACC Women's Basketball Legend. Page was named into the Philadelphia Sports Hall of Fame in 2013. In 2016, she joined the NC State Athletic Hall of Fame.

== Personal life and death ==
While in middle school, Page was given the nickname "Hawkeye". The name "Hawkeye" originated from NC State basketball player Hawkeye Whitney. While at NC State, Nancy Lieberman was Page's inspiration. Page released Love, Pain & Passion... The Heart of a Champion in 2010, where she recounted the events that happened to her. Page had multiple siblings before her death occurred on October 3, 2011. She died from a heart attack in Yeadon, Pennsylvania.

== See also ==
- List of basketball players who have scored 100 points in a single game
