= Lou Pucillo =

American basketball player (born 1936)

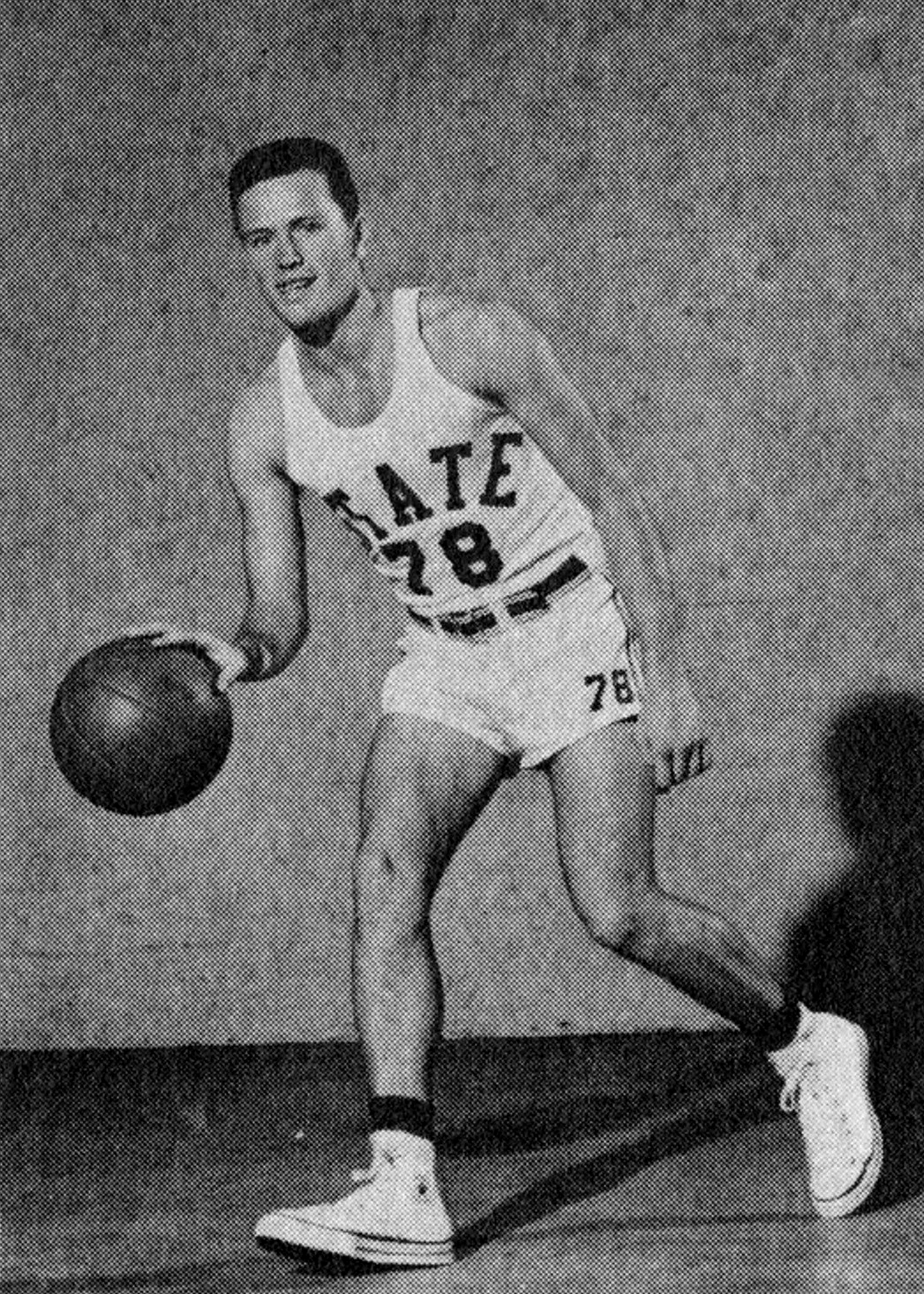
- Pucillo with NC State

Personal information
- Born: December 10, 1936 (age 89) Philadelphia, Pennsylvania, U.S.
- Listed height: 5 ft 9 in (1.75 m)
- Listed weight: 150 lb (68 kg)

Career information
- High school: Southeast Catholic (Philadelphia, Pennsylvania); Temple Prep (Philadelphia, Pennsylvania)
- College: NC State (1956–1959)
- NBA draft: 1959: 9th round, 65th overall pick
- Drafted by: St. Louis Hawks
- Position: Point guard

Career highlights
- First-team All-American – USBWA (1959); Second-team All-American – AP (1959); Third-team All-American – NABC, UPI (1959); ACC Player of the Year (1959); ACC Athlete of the Year (1959); 2× First-team All-ACC (1958, 1959); No. 78 jersey honored by NC State Wolfpack
- Stats at Basketball Reference

Lou Pucillo (born December 10, 1936) is an American former college basketball player for North Carolina State University from 1956 to 1959. Being only 5 foot 9 inches and 155 lbs., he was the smallest player to ever be recruited by Everett Case. As a guard for the Wolfpack he scored 944 points in 74 games. He was named on the first-team for the ACC in 1958 and 1959, the first team for the ACC Tournament in 1958 and 1959, and in 1959 he was named ACC Player of the Year.

After graduating from N.C. State, Pucillo played for the Wichita Vickers in National Industrial Basketball League and later played for Sunbury in the Eastern Professional Basketball League. After quitting his professional basketball career, he later coached freshman basketball at N.C. State for three seasons before leaving to enter private business.

In 1991, he was inducted into the North Carolina Sports Hall of Fame.
