= Dick Dickey =

American basketball player (1926–2006)

Personal information
- Born: October 26, 1926 Rigdon, Indiana, U.S.
- Died: July 3, 2006 (aged 79) Indianapolis, Indiana, U.S.
- Listed height: 6 ft 1 in (1.85 m)
- Listed weight: 175 lb (79 kg)

Career information
- High school: Pendleton (Pendleton, Indiana)
- College: NC State (1946–1950)
- NBA draft: 1950: 3rd round, 25th overall pick
- Drafted by: Baltimore Bullets
- Playing career: 1950–1952
- Position: Point guard
- Number: 23

Career history
- 1950–1951: Anderson Packers
- 1951–1952: Boston Celtics

Career highlights
- Consensus second-team All-American (1948); Second-team All-American – AP (1950); Third-team All-American – UPI (1950); 4× First-team All-SoCon (1947–1950); No. 70 jersey honored by NC State Wolfpack; Inducted into NC State Athletic Hall of Fame

Career NBA statistics
- Points: 127 (2.8 ppg)
- Rebounds: 81 (1.8 rpg)
- Assists: 50 (1.1 apg)
- Stats at NBA.com
- Stats at Basketball Reference

Richard Lea Dickey (October 26, 1926 – July 3, 2006) was an American professional basketball player for the National Professional Basketball League's Anderson Packers and National Basketball Association's Boston Celtics, although he is best remembered for his college career while playing at NC State. Dickey averaged 2.8 Points and 1.1 Assists while playing in a total of 45 games for the Celtics and Packers.

Dickey was drafted with the 2nd Pick in the 3rd round of the 1951 NBA Draft by the Baltimore Bullets, but he did not end up playing for them.

== Early life ==
Dickey was born in Rigdon, Indiana. He attended Pendleton High School in Pendleton, Indiana and graduated in 1944. During his senior year of his high school basketball career, of which he started for three years, Dickey earned All-Sectional honors while playing for coach Art Gross.

== Career ==
=== College ===
Dickey decided to attend North Carolina State University to play basketball for future Hall of Fame coach Everett Case two years after he graduated high school. It is his college career for which Dickey is most remembered. Between 1946–47 and 1949–50, the 6 ft 1 in (1.85 m) forward (who would later play guard professionally) led the Wolfpack to all four Southern Conference championships during his tenure and was named all-conference four times. He is the only NC State player to earn that distinction. The Wolfpack compiled an overall record of 106–23 in that time, finishing with season records of 26–5, 28–4, 25–8 and 27–6. As a sophomore in 1947–48, Dickey was voted a consensus Second Team All-American.

In 1949–50, Dickey's senior season, the Wolfpack advanced to the NCAA Tournament Final Four, where they lost to eventual national champion CCNY, 78–73. When the Wolfpack defeated Holy Cross in the quarterfinals, Dickey cut down the rim's net, which was an Indiana high school basketball tradition that he is credited with introducing to the college game. He was also selected to play in the East-West College All-Star game at the end of the year.

=== Professional ===
After graduating in 1950, Dickey was selected as the 25th pick in the third round by the Baltimore Bullets in the 1950 NBA draft. Although he was drafted by an NBA team, he actually spent his first year of professional basketball, 1950–51, playing for the Anderson Packers in the National Professional Basketball League, which existed independently for only that season. In 1951–52, Dickey played for the Boston Celtics of the NBA and finished with 127 points, 81 rebounds and 50 assists. Dickey would be let go at the end of the season and never played professionally again.

== NBA career statistics ==
Legend
GP	Games played	MPG	Minutes per game
FG%	Field-goal percentage	FT%	Free-throw percentage
RPG	Rebounds per game	APG	Assists per game
PPG	Points per game	**Bold**	Career high

=== Regular season ===
Year	Team	GP	MPG	FG%	FT%	RPG	APG	PPG
1951–52	Boston	45	9.8	.294	.681	1.8	1.1	2.8
Career		45	9.8	.294	.681	1.8	1.1	2.8

=== Playoffs ===
Year	Team	GP	MPG	FG%	FT%	RPG	APG	PPG
1952	Boston	3	10.3	.125	.857	1.0	1.7	2.7
Career		3	10.3	.125	.857	1.0	1.7	2.7

== Later life ==
After his basketball playing career ended, Dickey spent much of his later life in the insurance industry, spending 29 years with Farm Bureau Insurance. He received honors for his outstanding basketball career at NC State and at the high school level, including a 2005 induction into the Indiana Basketball Hall of Fame, a 2014 induction into the NC State Athletic Hall of Fame and having his college jersey number (#70) officially honored by NC State. Dickey died on July 3, 2006, in Indianapolis at age 79. The cause of death was due to complications from recent lung surgery. He was survived by his wife, Jean, and his seven children.
