= Sam Ranzino =

American basketball player (1927–1994)

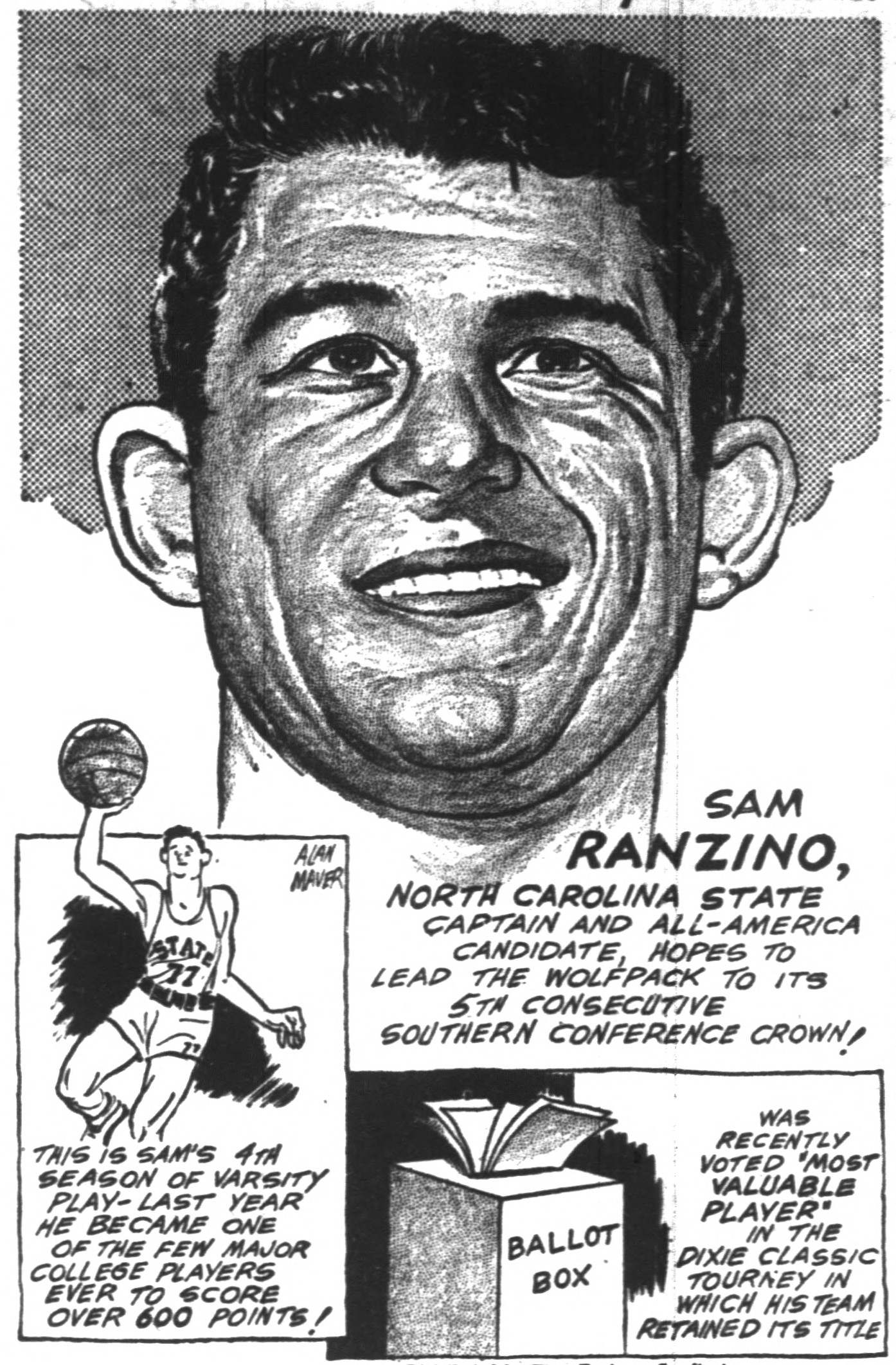
- A newspaper article about Ranzino in 1951 with accompanying sketches.

Personal information
- Born: June 21, 1927 Gary, Indiana, U.S.
- Died: March 13, 1994 (aged 66) Winnabow, North Carolina, U.S.
- Listed height: 6 ft 1 in (1.85 m)
- Listed weight: 185 lb (84 kg)

Career information
- High school: Emerson (Gary, Indiana)
- College: NC State (1947–1951)
- NBA draft: 1951: 1st round, 8th overall pick
- Drafted by: Rochester Royals
- Playing career: 1951–1952
- Position: Shooting guard
- Number: 3

Career history
- 1951–1952: Rochester Royals

Career highlights
- Consensus first-team All-American (1951); Second-team All-American – AP (1950); No. 77 jersey honored by NC State Wolfpack

Career statistics
- Points: 86 (2.2 ppg)
- Rebounds: 39 (1.0 rpg)
- Assists: 25 (0.6 apg)
- Stats at NBA.com
- Stats at Basketball Reference

Samuel Salvador Ranzino (June 21, 1927 – March 13, 1994) was an American college and professional basketball player. He was an All-American guard at North Carolina State University and played one season in the National Basketball Association (NBA) with the Rochester Royals.

Ranzino starred at Emerson High School in Gary, Indiana and was recruited to NC State by coach Everett Case, who also hailed from Indiana. Ranzino led the Wolfpack to four consecutive Southern Conference basketball titles and the school's first Final Four appearance in 1950. Individually, Ranzino received All-American mention in 1950 and was a consensus first-team All-American in 1951. Ranzino scored 1,967 points in his career, a mark that stood until 1975 when it was broken by David Thompson. Ranzino's number 77 is honored by NC State and hangs in the rafters of the RBC Center.

After completing his college career, Ranzino was selected by the Rochester Royals in the first round (8th pick overall) of the 1951 NBA draft. He played one season for the Royals, averaging 2.2 points per game.

Sam Ranzino was elected to the North Carolina Sports Hall of Fame in 1982.

== Career statistics ==
Legend
GP	Games played	GS	Games started	MPG	Minutes per game
FG%	Field goal percentage	3P%	3-point field goal percentage	FT%	Free throw percentage
RPG	Rebounds per game	APG	Assists per game	SPG	Steals per game
BPG	Blocks per game	PPG	Points per game	**Bold**	Career high

=== NBA ===
==== Regular season ====
Year	Team	GP	MPG	FG%	FT%	RPG	APG	PPG
1951–52	Rochester	39	6.0	.333	.703	1.0	.6	2.2
