= John Richter =

American basketball player (1937–1983)

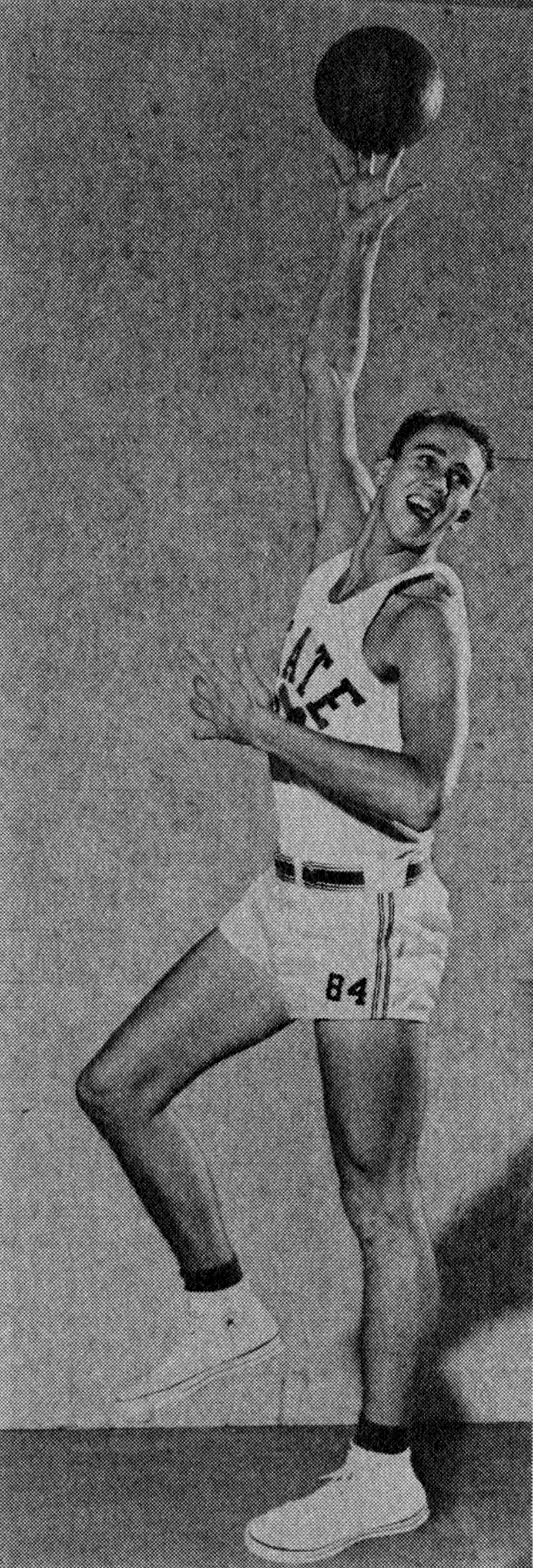
- Richter with NC State

Personal information
- Born: March 12, 1937 Philadelphia, Pennsylvania, U.S.
- Died: March 1, 1983 (aged 45)
- Listed height: 6 ft 9 in (2.06 m)
- Listed weight: 225 lb (102 kg)

Career information
- High school: Frankford (Philadelphia, Pennsylvania)
- College: NC State (1956–1959)
- NBA draft: 1959: 1st round, 6th overall pick
- Drafted by: Boston Celtics
- Playing career: 1959–1972
- Position: Power forward
- Number: 16

Career history
- 1959–1960: Boston Celtics
- 1961–1971: Sunbury Mercuries
- 1971–1972: Scranton Apollos

Career highlights
- NBA champion (1960); 2× All-EPBL/EBA First Team (1969, 1971); Second-team All-American – NABC, NEA (1959); First-team All-ACC (1959); 2× Second-team All-ACC (1957, 1958); No. 24 jersey honored by NC State Wolfpack

Career NBA statistics
- Points: 285 (4.3 ppg)
- Rebounds: 312 (4.7 rpg)
- Assists: 27 (0.4 apg)
- Stats at NBA.com
- Stats at Basketball Reference

John Fritz Richter (March 12, 1937 – March 1, 1983) was an American basketball player. He attended Frankford High School in Philadelphia.

A 6'9" power forward from North Carolina State University, Richter played one season (1959–60) in the National Basketball Association (NBA) as a member of the Boston Celtics. He averaged 4.3 points per game and earned an NBA championship ring when the Celtics defeated the St. Louis Hawks in the 1960 NBA Finals.

Following his NBA career, Richter moved to the Eastern Professional Basketball League (EPBL) / Eastern Basketball Association (EBA) playing for the Sunbury Mercuries in Sunbury, Pennsylvania. Richter possessed a formidable hook shot and was frequently one of the EBA's top rebounders. He was selected to the All-EPBL/EBA First Team in 1969 and 1971.

== Career statistics ==
=== NBA ===
Legend
GP	Games played	GS	Games started	MPG	Minutes per game
FG%	Field goal percentage	3P%	3-point field goal percentage	FT%	Free throw percentage
RPG	Rebounds per game	APG	Assists per game	SPG	Steals per game
BPG	Blocks per game	PPG	Points per game	**Bold**	Career high
†	Won an NBA championship

==== Regular season ====
Year	Team	GP	MPG	FG%	FT%	RPG	APG	PPG
1959–60†	Boston	66	12.2	.340	.504	4.7	.4	4.3

==== Playoffs ====
Year	Team	GP	MPG	FG%	FT%	RPG	APG	PPG
1960†	Boston	8	11.9	.395	.357	3.6	.3	4.4
