= Ronnie Shavlik =

American basketball player (1933–1983)

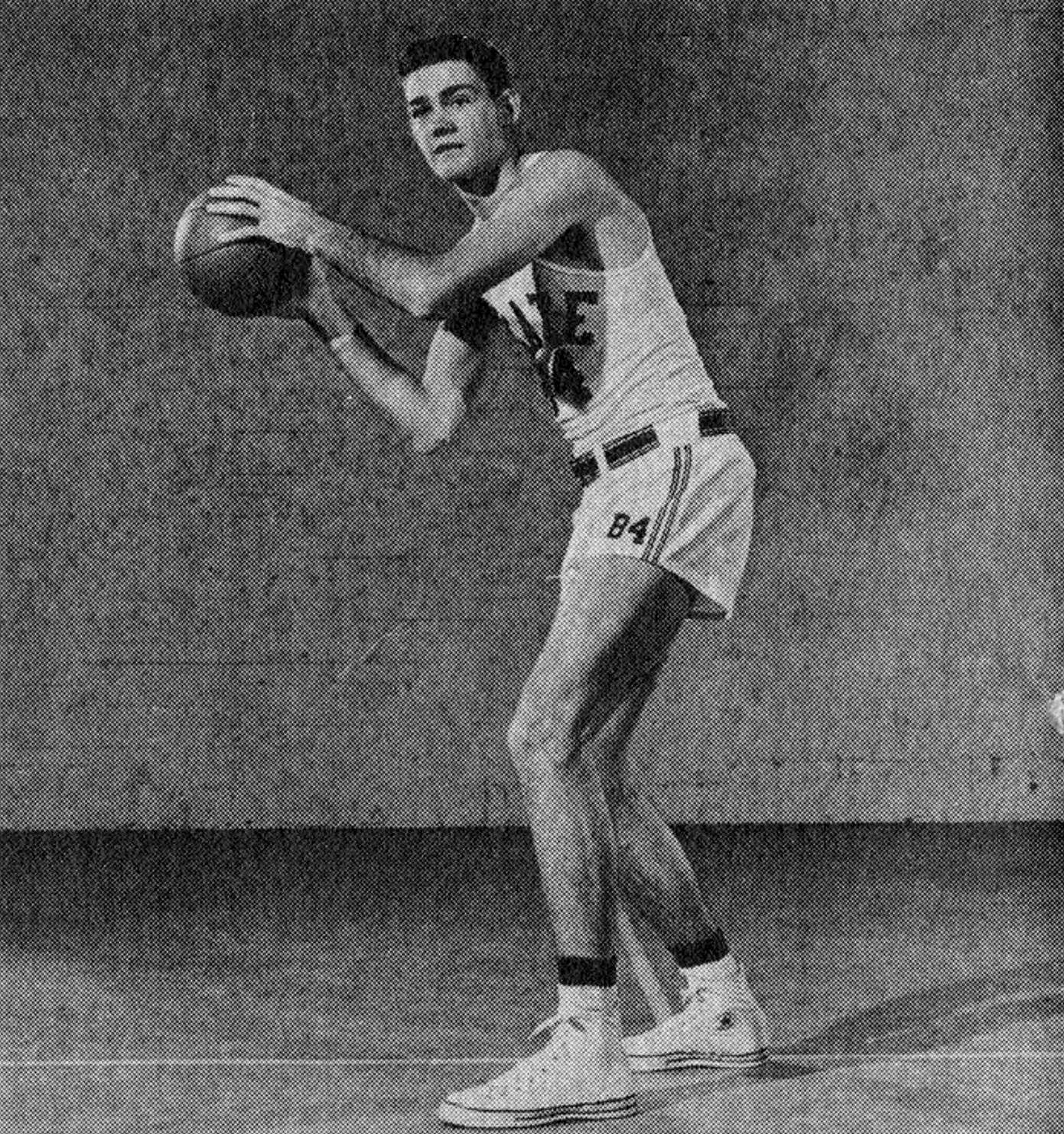
- Shavlik with NC State

Personal information
- Born: December 4, 1933 Denver, Colorado, U.S.
- Died: June 27, 1983 (aged 49) Raleigh, North Carolina, U.S.
- Listed height: 6 ft 8 in (2.03 m)
- Listed weight: 200 lb (91 kg)

Career information
- High school: East (Denver, Colorado)
- College: NC State (1953–1956)
- NBA draft: 1956: 1st round, 4th overall pick
- Drafted by: New York Knicks
- Playing career: 1956–1958
- Position: Forward
- Number: 14, 16

Career history
- 1956–1958: New York Knicks

Career highlights
- Consensus first-team All-American (1956); Consensus second-team All-American (1955); ACC Player of the Year (1956); 2× First-team All-ACC (1955, 1956); No. 84 jersey honored by NC State Wolfpack
- Stats at NBA.com
- Stats at Basketball Reference

Ronald Dean Shavlik (December 4, 1933 – June 27, 1983) was an American professional basketball player. He was an All-American center for the NC State Wolfpack in the 1950s. He later played briefly for the New York Knicks of the National Basketball Association (NBA).

Shavlik established a janitorial service, Carolina Maintenance Co., as a college student in 1956. After his playing career, he focused on growing the business. He was inducted into the North Carolina Sports Hall of Fame in 1979 and the NC State Athletic Hall of Fame in 2013. Shavlik was inducted into the Raleigh Hall of Fame on November 4, 2018. Shavlik died of cancer at the age of 49.

His grandson, Shavlik Randolph, played college basketball for Duke University and has played professionally in the NBA.

== Career statistics ==
Legend
GP	Games played	GS	Games started	MPG	Minutes per game
FG%	Field goal percentage	3P%	3-point field goal percentage	FT%	Free throw percentage
RPG	Rebounds per game	APG	Assists per game	SPG	Steals per game
BPG	Blocks per game	PPG	Points per game	**Bold**	Career high

=== NBA ===
==== Regular season ====
Year	Team	GP	MPG	FG%	FT%	RPG	APG	PPG
1956–57	New York	**7**	**10.3**	**.182**	**.400**	**3.1**	.0	**1.4**
1957–58	New York	1	2.0	.000	–	1.0	.0	.0
Career		8	9.3	.174	.400	2.9	.0	1.3

== See also ==
- List of second-generation National Basketball Association players
- List of NCAA Division I men's basketball players with 30 or more rebounds in a game
- List of NCAA Division I men's basketball career rebounding leaders
