= Tobacco Road (rivalry) =

College athletics team rivalry in North Carolina, United States

Locations of the four universities in North Carolina.

North Carolina Tar Heels

Duke Blue Devils

NC State Wolfpack

Wake Forest Demon Deacons

Tobacco Road is a term used in college sports, mainly basketball, for the four rival universities of North Carolina (also known locally as the "Big Four") that play in the Atlantic Coast Conference (ACC). The term refers to the area's history as a major tobacco producer. The Tobacco Road teams represent the following universities:

- North Carolina Tar Heels (University of North Carolina at Chapel Hill in Chapel Hill)
- Duke Blue Devils (Duke University in Durham)
- NC State Wolfpack (North Carolina State University in Raleigh)
- Wake Forest Demon Deacons (Wake Forest University in Winston-Salem)

North Carolina, Duke, and NC State lie in the Research Triangle and are separated by no more than 25 miles (40 km). Before moving to Winston-Salem in 1956, Wake Forest University was located in the town of Wake Forest within the Triangle region, to the northeast of Raleigh. The schools are historical and present powerhouses among college sports, especially basketball. The universities' proximity and membership in the ACC, coupled with their reputation for academic prestige and as hubs for research and innovation, has created a natural rivalry among students, fans, and alumni.

== Basketball ==
=== Men's basketball ===
These four universities are also known in the state as the "Big Four" and competed in the Dixie Classic men's basketball tournament from 1949 to 1961, in which the four schools won all 13 tournaments played. They also played in the Big Four Tournament in Greensboro, North Carolina, from 1971 to 1981. The Wake–Duke rivalry is the oldest basketball rivalry among the four schools in that it dates back to the 1905–06 season and was the first intercollegiate basketball game in North Carolina. The Wake-Duke rivalry is just ahead of the more well known UNC-Duke rivalry in terms of games played by two games. The rivalries between the four schools also account for six of the most frequently played men's basketball rivalries in the ACC. The four schools have a combined 13 men's national basketball championships (UNC has 7 (6 NCAA), Duke has 5, NC State has 2). The four schools also won 2 NIT titles (UNC won 1, and Wake won 1). In the men's tournament they have combined to have 11 runners-up (Duke has 6 and UNC has 5) and 39 Final Fours (UNC has 20, Duke has 16, NC State has 4, and Wake has 1). At least one Tobacco Road team has made the NCAA Tournament every year since 1974. Since the NCAA Tournament started in 1939, all four teams have missed the same tournament eleven times. The years in which none of the teams were in the tournament was 1940, 1942, 1943, 1944, 1945, 1947, 1948, 1949, 1958, 1971, and 1973. All four teams have made the same tournament 4 times (1991, 2003, 2004, 2005). Prior to the 2014 NCAA Tournament, at least one of the teams had made the Sweet 16 since 1979.

Aside from the ACC Tournament, the four schools have only played each other in the postseason four times, only twice in the NCAA tournament. The first two times came in the NIT Tournament: Wake beat NC State in a semifinal game of the 2000 NIT Tournament and went on to win the tournament, and UNC beat Duke in a semifinal game of the 1971 NIT Tournament, also winning the tournament. The third time was UNC’s victory over Duke in the Final Four of the 2022 NCAA Tournament in New Orleans. The fourth time was NC State’s win over Duke on Easter Sunday in the Elite Eight of the 2024 NCAA Tournament in Dallas.

Tobacco Road national postseason games
Team 1	Score	Team 2
Date Tournament	Round Venue	
North Carolina Tar Heels	73–67	Duke Blue Devils
March 25, 1971; 1971 National Invitation Tournament	Semifinals; Madison Square Garden, New York City	
Wake Forest Demon Deacons	62–59	North Carolina State Wolfpack
March 28, 2000; 2000 National Invitation Tournament	Semifinals; Madison Square Garden, New York City	
Duke Blue Devils (West #2)	77–81	North Carolina Tar Heels (East #8)
April 2nd, 2022; 2022 NCAA Tournament	Final Four (National Semifinal); Caesars Superdome, New Orleans, Louisiana	
Duke Blue Devils (South #4)	64–76	North Carolina State Wolfpack (South #11)
March 31st, 2024; 2024 NCAA Tournament	Elite Eight (South Regional Final); American Airlines Center, Dallas, Texas	

Furthermore, in 1991 in Indianapolis, Duke and UNC came within one game of playing each other for the national championship. North Carolina lost 79–73 to Kansas, coached by former Tar Heel assistant and future head coach Roy Williams, while Duke upset previously undefeated UNLV 79–77 in a rematch of the previous year's championship game, which UNLV had won by 30 in Denver.

The four schools have combined to win 71 men's conference tournaments with 21 SoCon tournaments and 50 ACC tournaments (UNC won 26, Duke won 24, NC State won 17, and Wake Forest won 5). While in the Southern Conference they won or shared 17 SoCon regular season titles between the 1922–23 and 1952–53 seasons. They have also dominated ACC regular season play, having won or shared 52 regular season titles between them, including all but seven since the 1980–81 season.

Records (1949–2024)
Team	v. UNC	v. NCSU	v. Duke	v. WFU	Overall Record	Winning %
North Carolina	N/A	120–60	104–89	111–52	335–201	.625
NC State	60–120	N/A	74–99	106–76	240–295	.449
Duke	89–104	99–74	N/A	126–59	314–237	.570
Wake Forest	52–111	76–106	59–126	N/A	187–343	.353

=== Women's basketball ===
While the women's basketball teams have not been as successful, one team from the region has won the NCAA championship with North Carolina, who did so in 1994. They have reached the Final Four on three occasions, reaching in 1994, 2006, and 2007. They have won the Atlantic Coast Conference tournament nine times while winning the regular season title four times. Duke has made the NCAA Tournament Championship twice, losing in 1999 and 2006. They made the Final Four on four occasions (1999, 2002, 2003, 2006). They have won eight ACC tournament championships and twelve regular season titles. NC State has advanced to the Final Four twice, doing so in 1998 and 2024. They have won the ACC Tournament seven times and the regular season six times. Wake Forest has had the least amount of success, as they have only reached the NCAA Tournament on two occasions (1988, 2021). At least one of the four schools has made all but 10 of the 46 combined CIAW, AIAW, and NCAA tournaments since 1969, and all since 1980.

== Football ==
Though the Tobacco Road rivalry predominantly relates to basketball, football between these programs is also competitive. As of the 2025 season, the four schools have combined to appear in 111 bowl games (Duke has 18, won 9; UNC has 38, won 15; NC State has 37, won 17; Wake has 18, won 12). They have also shared or won outright a combined 32 conference championships (20 ACC and 12 SoCon). Through 2025, NC State is the only school out of the four to not appear in the ACC Championship Game. The ACC adopted a divisional format in 2005 which divided the four schools in which Wake Forest and NC State were put in the Atlantic Division, while Duke and UNC were put in the Coastal Division. Wake Forest and Duke were "permanent cross-division" rivals, meaning that they played every year regardless of division, as did UNC and NC State. The Wake–UNC and Duke–NC State games were played two of every twelve years, excluding additional matchups played as non-conference games. After the ACC divisions were abolished in 2023, a protected rivalry scheduling system was adopted. All four teams have the three other Tobacco Road schools as rivals, except Wake–UNC. In football, the four schools have produced 5 players and no coaches in the Pro Football Hall of Fame. They have also produced 15 players and 6 coaches in the College Football Hall of Fame. The oldest of the football rivalries between the four schools belongs to the UNC-Wake rivalry, which dates back to October 10, 1888 and was the first intercollegiate football game in North Carolina.

The four schools compete unofficially for a "state championship," with the school(s) with the best record in their two to three games against the other Tobacco Road rivals claiming the championship. Since 2024, the winner of the state championship has been awarded "The Battle for the Old North State" trophy. The trophy depicts a pig smoking a cigar, representing two of the state's historical industries (swine and tobacco), as well as the state's barbecue rivalries and the traditional rivalry name "Tobacco Road." Since the trophy's inception, Duke has dominated, winning all six of its Tobacco Road games in 2024 and 2025 and claiming the trophy each year.

North Carolina victories	NC State victories	Duke victories	Wake Forest victories

Year	Winner	Summary	UNC vs. NCSU	UNC vs. Duke	UNC vs. WF	NCSU vs. Duke	NCSU vs. WF	Duke vs. WF
1924	Wake Forest	WF 3–0, UNC 2–1, NCSU 1–2, Duke 0–3	UNC 10–0	UNC 6–0	WF 7–6	NCSU 14–0	WF 12–0	WF 32–0
1925	Split UNC, NCSU, WF	UNC 2–1, NCSU 2–1, WF 2–1, Duke 0–3	UNC 17–0	UNC 41–0	WF 6–0	NCSU 13–0	NCSU 6–0	WF 21–3
1926	Split UNC, NCSU, WF	UNC 2–1, NCSU 2–1, WF 2–1, Duke 0–3	UNC 12–0	UNC 6–0	WF 13–0	NCSU 26–19	NCSU 7–3	WF 21–0
1927	NC State	NCSU 3–0, UNC 1–2, Duke 1–2, WF 1–2	NCSU 19–6	UNC 18–0	WF 9–8	NCSU 20–18	NCSU 30–7	Duke 32–6
1928	North Carolina	UNC 2–0–1, Duke 2–1, NCSU 1–1–1, WF 0–3	Tie 6–6	UNC 14–7	UNC 65–0	Duke 19–12	NCSU 37–0	Duke 38–0
1929	North Carolina	UNC 3–0, Duke 2–1, NCSU 1–2, WF 0–3	UNC 32–0	UNC 48–7	UNC 48–0	Duke 14–12	NCSU 8–6	Duke 20–0
1930	North Carolina	UNC 2–0–1, Duke 1–0–2, WF 1–2, NCSU 0–3	UNC 13–6	Tie 0–0	UNC 13–7	Duke 18–0	WF 7–0	Tie 13–13
1931	North Carolina	UNC 2–0–1, Duke 1–1–1, WF 1–2, NCSU 1–2	UNC 18–15	Tie 0–0	UNC 37–0	NCSU 14–0	WF 6–0	Duke 28–0
1932	Duke	Duke 2–1, UNC 1–1–1, NCSU 1–1–1, WF 0–1–2	UNC 13–0	Duke 7–0	Tie 0–0	NCSU 6–0	Tie 0–0	Duke 9–0
1933	Duke	Duke 3–0, UNC 2–1, NCSU 0–2–1, WF 0–2–1	UNC 6–0	Duke 21–0	UNC 26–0	Duke 7–0	Tie 0–0	Duke 22–0
1934	North Carolina	UNC 2–0–1, Duke 2–1, WF 1–2, NCSU 0–2–1	Tie 7–7	UNC 7–0	UNC 21–0	Duke 32–0	WF 13–12	Duke 28–7
1935	Duke	Duke 3–0, UNC 2–1, NCSU 1–2, WF 0–3	UNC 35–6	Duke 25–0	UNC 14–0	Duke 7–0	NCSU 21–6	Duke 26–7
1936	Duke	Duke 3–0, UNC 2–1, WF 1–2, NCSU 0–3	UNC 21–6	Duke 27–7	UNC 14–7	Duke 13–0	WF 9–0	Duke 20–0
1937	North Carolina	UNC 3–0, Duke 2–1, NCSU 1–2, WF 0–3	UNC 20–0	UNC 14–6	UNC 28–0	Duke 20–7	NCSU 20–0	Duke 67–0
1938	Duke	Duke 3–0, UNC 2–1, NCSU 1–2, WF 0–3	UNC 21–0	Duke 14–0	UNC 14–6	Duke 7–0	NCSU 19–7	Duke 7–0
1939	Duke	Duke 3–0, UNC 2–1, WF 1–2, NCSU 0–3	UNC 17–0	Duke 13–3	UNC 36–6	Duke 28–0	WF 32–0	Duke 6–0
1940	Split UNC, Duke, WF	UNC 2–1, Duke 2–1, WF 2–1, NCSU 0–3	UNC 13–7	UNC 6–3	WF 12–0	Duke 42–6	WF 20–14	Duke 23–0
1941	Duke	Duke 3–0, WF 2–1, NCSU 1–2, UNC 0–3	NCSU 13–7	Duke 20–0	WF 13–0	Duke 55–6	WF 7–0	Duke 43–14
1942	Split UNC, NCSU, Duke, WF	UNC 1–1–1, NCSU 1–1–1, Duke 1–1–1, WF 1–1–1	NCSU 21–14	Tie 13–13	UNC 6–0	Duke 47–0	Tie 0–0	WF 20–7
1943	Duke*	Duke 2–0, WF 1–0, UNC 1–1, NCSU 0–2	UNC 27–13	Duke 14–7	—N/a	Duke 75–0	WF 54–6	—N/a
1944	Duke†*	Duke 2–0, WF 2–0, NCSU 0–1, UNC 0–2	—N/a	Duke 14–7	WF 33–0	—N/a	WF 21–7	Duke 43–0
1945	Duke*	Duke 3–0, WF 2–1, UNC 0–2, NCSU 0–2	—N/a	Duke 14–7	WF 14–13	Duke 26–13	WF 19–18	Duke 26–19
1946	Split UNC, NCSU*	UNC 2–0, NCSU 2–0, Duke 1–2, WF 0–3	—N/a	UNC 22–7	UNC 26–14	NCSU 13–6	NCSU 14–6	Duke 13–0
1947	North Carolina†	UNC 2–1, Duke 2–1, NCSU 1–2, WF 1–2	UNC 41–6	UNC 21–0	WF 19–7	Duke 7–0	NCSU 20–0	Duke 13–6
1948	North Carolina	UNC 3–0, WF 2–1, NCSU 0–2–1, Duke 0–2–1	UNC 14–0	UNC 20–0	UNC 28–6	Tie 0–0	WF 34–13	WF 27–20
1949	North Carolina	UNC 3–0, NCSU 1–2, Duke 1–2, WF 1–2	UNC 26–6	UNC 21–20	UNC 28–14	Duke 14–13	NCSU 27–14	WF 27–7
1950	Wake Forest	WF 2–0–1, Duke 2–1, UNC 1–2, NCSU 0–2–1	UNC 13–7	Duke 7–0	WF 13–7	Duke 7–0	Tie 6–6	WF 13–7
1951	Wake Forest	WF 3–0, Duke 2–1, UNC 1–2, NCSU 0–3	UNC 21–0	Duke 19–7	WF 39–7	Duke 27–21	WF 21–6	WF 19–13
1952	Duke*	Duke 3–0, WF 2–1, UNC 0–2, NCSU 0–2	—N/a	Duke 34–0	WF 9–7	Duke 57–0	WF 21–16	Duke 14–7
1953	Duke	Duke 3–0, UNC 2–1, WF 1–2, NCSU 0–3	UNC 29–7	Duke 35–20	UNC 18–13	Duke 31–0	WF 20–7	Duke 19–0
1954	Duke	Duke 3–0, UNC 2–1, WF 1–2, NCSU 0–3	UNC 20–6	Duke 47–12	UNC 14–7	Duke 21–7	WF 26–0	Duke 28–21
1955	Duke	Duke 3–0, WF 1–1–1, UNC 1–2, NCSU 0–2–1	UNC 25–18	Duke 6–0	WF 25–0	Duke 33–7	Tie 13–13	Duke 14–0
1956	Duke	Duke 3–0, WF 1–1–1, NCSU 1–2, UNC 0–2–1,	NCSU 26–6	Duke 21–6	Tie 6–6	Duke 42–0	WF 13–0	Duke 26–0
1957	NC State	NCSU 2–0–1, UNC 2–1, Duke 1–1–1, WF 0–3	NCSU 7–0	UNC 21–13	UNC 14–7	Tie 14–14	NCSU 19–0	Duke 34–7
1958	Duke	Duke 3–0, UNC 1–2, Duke 1–2, WF 1–2	NCSU 21–14	Duke 7–6	UNC 26–7	Duke 20–13	WF 13–7	Duke 29–0
1959	North Carolina	UNC 3–0, Duke 2–1, WF 1–2, NCSU 0–3	UNC 20–12	UNC 50–0	UNC 21–19	Duke 17–15	WF 17–14	Duke 27–15
1960	Duke†	NCSU 2–1, Duke 2–1, UNC 1–2, WF 1–2	NCSU 3–0	UNC 7–6	WF 13–12	Duke 17–13	NCSU 14–12	Duke 34–7
1961	Duke	Duke 3–0, UNC 1–2, NCSU 1–2, WF 1–2	UNC 27–22	Duke 6–3	WF 17–14	Duke 17–6	NCSU 7–0	Duke 23–3
1962	Duke	Duke 3–0, NCSU 2–1, UNC 1–2, WF 0–3	NCSU 27–22	Duke 16–14	UNC 23–14	Duke 21–14	NCSU 27–3	Duke 50–0
1963	North Carolina	UNC 3–0, NCSU 2–1, Duke 1–2, WF 0–3	UNC 31–10	UNC 16–14	UNC 21–0	NCSU 21–7	NCSU 42–0	Duke 39–7
1964	North Carolina†	UNC 2–1, WF 2–1, NCSU 1–2, Duke 1–2	NCSU 14–13	UNC 21–15	UNC 23–0	Duke 35–3	WF 27–13	WF 20–7
1965	NC State†	NCSU 2–1, Duke 2–1, UNC 1–2, WF 1–2	UNC 10–7	Duke 34–7	WF 12–10	NCSU 21–0	NCSU 13–11	Duke 40–7
1966	NC State*	NCSU 2–1, Duke 1–1, WF 1–1, UNC 1–2	UNC 10–7	Duke 41–25	WF 3–0	NCSU 33–7	NCSU 15–12	—N/a
1967	NC State	NCSU 3–0, UNC 1–2, Duke 1–2, WF 1–2	NCSU 13–7	UNC 20–9	WF 20–10	NCSU 28–7	NCSU 24–7	Duke 31–13
1968	NC State	NCSU 3–0, UNC 1–2, Duke 1–2, WF 1–2	NCSU 38–6	UNC 25–14	WF 48–31	NCSU 17–15	NCSU 10–6	Duke 18–3
1969	Duke	Duke 2–0–1, NCSU 1–1–1, UNC 1–2, WF 1–2	NCSU 10–3	Duke 17–13	UNC 23–3	Tie 25–25	WF 22–21	Duke 27–20
1970	Wake Forest	Wake 3–0, UNC 2–1, Duke 1–2, NCSU 0–3	UNC 19–0	UNC 59–34	WF 14–13	Duke 22–6	WF 16–13	WF 28–14
1971	North Carolina	UNC 3–0, NCSU 1–2, Duke 1–2, WF 1–2	UNC 27–7	UNC 38–0	UNC 7–3	Duke 41–13	NCSU 21–14	WF 23–7
1972	North Carolina	UNC 3–0, NCSU 2–1, WF 1–2, Duke 0–3	UNC 34–33	UNC 14–0	UNC 21–0	NCSU 17–0	NCSU 42–13	WF 9–7
1973	NC State	NCSU 3–0, Duke 1–1–1, UNC 1–2, WF 0–2–1	NCSU 28–26	Duke 27–10	UNC 42–0	NCSU 21–3	NCSU 52–13	Tie 7–7
1974	North Carolina	UNC 3–0, NCSU 2–1, Duke 1–2, WF 0–3	UNC 33–14	UNC 14–13	UNC 31–0	NCSU 35–21	NCSU 33–15	Duke 23–7
1975	Wake Forest	WF 2–1, Duke 1–0–2, NCSU 1–1–1, UNC 0–2–1	NCSU 21–20	Tie 17–17	WF 21–9	Tie 21–21	WF 30–22	Duke 42–14
1976	North Carolina†	UNC 2–1, WF 2–1, NCSU 1–2, Duke 1–2	NCSU 21–13	UNC 39–38	UNC 34–14	Duke 28–14	WF 20–18	WF 38–17
1977	North Carolina	UNC 3–0, NCSU 2–1, Duke 1–2, WF 0–3	UNC 27–14	UNC 16–3	UNC 24–3	NCSU 37–32	NCSU 41–14	Duke 38–14
1978	NC State	NCSU 3–0, UNC 2–1, Duke 1–2, WF 0–3	NCSU 34–7	UNC 16–15	UNC 34–29	NCSU 24–10	NCSU 34–10	Duke 3–0
1979	Split UNC, NCSU, WF	UNC 2–1, NCSU 2–1, WF 2–1, Duke 0–3	UNC 35–21	UNC 37–16	WF 24–19	NCSU 28–7	NCSU 17–14	WF 17–14
1980	North Carolina	UNC 3–0, WF 2–1, NCSU 1–2, Duke 0–3	UNC 28–8	UNC 44–21	UNC 27–9	NCSU 38–21	WF 27–7	WF 27–24
1981	North Carolina	UNC 3–0, Duke 2–1, NCSU 1–2, WF 0–3	UNC 21–10	UNC 31–10	UNC 48–10	Duke 17–7	NCSU 28–3	Duke 31–10
1982	Split UNC, NCSU, Duke	UNC 2–1, NCSU 2–1, Duke 2–1, WF 0–3	UNC 41–9	Duke 23–17	UNC 24–7	NCSU 21–16	NCSU 30–0	Duke 46–26
1983	North Carolina	UNC 3–0, Duke 2–1, NCSU 1–2, WF 0–3	UNC 42–14	UNC 34–27	UNC 30–10	Duke 27–26	NCSU 38–15	Duke 31–21
1984	Wake Forest	WF 3–0, UNC 2–1, Duke 1–2, NCSU 0–3	UNC 28–21	UNC 17–15	WF 14–3	Duke 16–13	WF 24–15	WF 20–16
1985	Duke†	UNC 2–1, Duke 2–1, NCSU 1–2, WF 1–2	UNC 21–14	Duke 23–21	UNC 34–14	Duke 31–19	NCSU 20–17	WF 27–7
1986	NC State	NCSU 3–0, UNC 2–1, Duke 1–2, WF 0–3	NCSU 35–34	UNC 42–35	UNC 40–30	NCSU 29–15	NCSU 42–38	Duke 38–36
1987	Wake Forest	WF 3–0, UNC 1–2, NCSU 1–2, Duke 1–2	UNC 17–14	Duke 25–10	WF 22–14	NCSU 47–45	WF 21–3	WF 30–27
1988	NC State	NCSU 2–0–1, WF 2–1, Duke 1–1–1, UNC 0–3	NCSU 48–3	Duke 35–29	WF 42–24	Tie 43–43	NCSU 14–6	WF 35–16
1989	Duke	Duke 3–0, NCSU 2–1, WF 1–2, UNC 0–3	NCSU 40–6	Duke 41–0	WF 17–16	Duke 35–26	NCSU 27–17	Duke 52–35
1990	NC State	NCSU 3–0, UNC 2–1, Duke 1–2, WF 0–3	NCSU 12–9	UNC 24–22	UNC 31–24	NCSU 16–0	NCSU 20–15	Duke 57–20
1991	NC State	NCSU 3–0, UNC 2–1, WF 1–2, Duke 0–3	NCSU 24–7	UNC 47–14	UNC 24–10	NCSU 32–31	NCSU 30–3	WF 31–14
1992	NC State	NCSU 3–0, UNC 2–1, WF 1–2, Duke 0–3	NCSU 27–20	UNC 31–28	UNC 35–17	NCSU 45–27	NCSU 42–14	WF 28–14
1993	North Carolina	UNC 3–0, Duke 2–1, NCSU 1–2, WF 0–3	UNC 35–14	UNC 38–24	UNC 45–35	Duke 21–20	NCSU 34–16	Duke 21–13
1994	North Carolina	UNC 3–0, Duke 2–1, NCSU 1–2, WF 0–3	UNC 31–17	UNC 41–40	UNC 50–0	NCSU 24–23	NCSU 31–3	Duke 51–26
1995	North Carolina	UNC 3–0, NCSU 2–1, Duke 1–2, WF 0–3	UNC 30–28	UNC 28–24	UNC 31–7	NCSU 24–23	NCSU 41–38	Duke 42–26
1996	North Carolina	UNC 3–0, NCSU 2–1, WF 1–2, Duke 0–3	UNC 52–20	UNC 27–10	UNC 45–6	NCSU 44–22	NCSU 37–22	WF 17–16
1997	North Carolina	UNC 3–0, WF 2–1, NCSU 1–2, Duke 0–3	UNC 20–7	UNC 50–14	UNC 30–12	NCSU 45–14	WF 19–18	WF 38–24
1998	North Carolina	UNC 3–0, NCSU 2–1, Duke 1–2, WF 0–3	UNC 37–34	UNC 28–6	UNC 38–31	NCSU 27–24	NCSU 38–27	Duke 19–16
1999	Wake Forest†	UNC 2–1, WF 2–1, NCSU 1–2, Duke 1–2	UNC 10–6	UNC 38–0	WF 19–3	NCSU 31–24	WF 31–7	Duke 48–35
2000	NC State	NCSU 3–0, UNC 2–1, WF 1–2, Duke 0–3	NCSU 38–20	UNC 59–21	UNC 35–14	NCSU 35–31	NCSU 32–14	WF 28–26
2001	Split UNC, NCSU, WF	UNC 2–1, NCSU 2–1, WF 2–1, Duke 0–3	UNC 17–9	UNC 52–17	WF 32–31	NCSU 55–31	NCSU 17–14	WF 42–35
2002	NC State	NCSU 3–0, WF 2–1, UNC 1–2, Duke 0–3	NCSU 34–17	UNC 23–21	WF 31–0	NCSU 24–22	NCSU 32–13	WF 36–10
2003	Wake Forest†	NCSU 2–1, WF 2–1, UNC 1–2, Duke 1–2	NCSU 47–34	Duke 30–22	UNC 42–34	NCSU 28–21	WF 38–24	WF 42–13
2004	North Carolina*	UNC 3–0, NCSU 1–1, WF 1–2, Duke 0–2	UNC 30–24	UNC 40–17	UNC 31–24	—N/a	NCSU 27–21^{OT}	WF 34–22
2005	Split UNC, WF*	UNC 2–0, WF 2–0, NCSU 0–2, Duke 0–2	UNC 31–24	UNC 24–21	—N/a	—N/a	WF 27–19	WF 44–6
2006	Wake Forest*	WF 3–0, UNC 2–1, NCSU 0–2, Duke 0–2	UNC 23–9	UNC 45–44	WF 24–17	—N/a	WF 25–23	WF 14–13
2007	Wake Forest*	WF 3–0, NCSU 1–1, UNC 1–2, Duke 0–2	NCSU 31–27	UNC 20–14	WF 37–10	—N/a	WF 38–18	WF 41–36
2008	NC State*	NCSU 3–0, UNC 1–1, WF 1–1, Duke 0–3	NCSU 41–10	UNC 28–20	—N/a	NCSU 27–17	NCSU 21–17	WF 33–30
2009	Wake Forest*	WF 2–0, UNC 1–1, NCSU 1–2, Duke 1–2	NCSU 29–27	UNC 19–6	—N/a	Duke 49–28	WF 30–24	WF 45–34
2010	NC State*	NCSU 2–0, UNC 1–1, WF 1–1, Duke 0–2	NCSU 29–25	UNC 24–19	—N/a	—N/a	NCSU 38–3	WF 54–48
2011	North Carolina†*	UNC 2–1, WF 2–1, NCSU 1–1, Duke 0–2	NCSU 13–0	UNC 37–21	UNC 49–24	—N/a	WF 34–27	WF 24–23
2012	Duke*	Duke 2–0, NCSU 1–1, WF 1–2, UNC 1–2	UNC 43–35	Duke 33–30	WF 28–27	—N/a	NCSU 37–6	Duke 34–27
2013	Duke*	Duke 3–0, UNC 1–1, WF 1–1, NCSU 0–3	UNC 27–19	Duke 27–25	—N/a	Duke 38–20	WF 28–13	Duke 28–21
2014	NC State*	NCSU 2–0, Duke 1–1, UNC 1–1, WF 0–2	NCSU 35–7	UNC 45–20	—N/a	—N/a	NCSU 42–13	Duke 41–21
2015	North Carolina*	UNC 3–0, NCSU 1–1, Duke 1–1, WF 0–3	UNC 45–35	UNC 66–33	UNC 50–14	—N/a	NCSU 35–17	Duke 27–21
2016	NC State*	NCSU 2–0, WF 1–1, Duke 1–1, UNC 0–2	NCSU 28–21	Duke 28–27	—N/a	—N/a	NCSU 33–16	WF 24–14
2017	Duke*	Duke 2–0, NCSU 1–1, WF 1–1, UNC 0–2	NCSU 34–28^{OT}	Duke 27–17	—N/a	—N/a	WF 27–23	Duke 31–23
2018	Wake Forest*	WF 2–0, NCSU 1–1, Duke 1–1, UNC 0–2	NCSU 33–21	Duke 45–35	—N/a	—N/a	WF 30–24	WF 59–7
2019	Wake Forest*	WF 3–0, UNC 2–1, NCSU 0–2, Duke 0–2	UNC 41–10	UNC 20–17	WF 24–18	—N/a	WF 44–10	WF 39–27
2020	North Carolina*	UNC 3–0, NCSU 2–1, Duke 0–2, WF 0–2	UNC 48–21	UNC 56–24	UNC 59–53*	NCSU 31–20	NCSU 45–42	Canceled
2021	North Carolina†*	UNC 2–1, WF 2–1, NCSU 1–1, Duke 0–2	NCSU 34–30	UNC 38–7	UNC 58–55	—N/a	WF 45–42	WF 45–7
2022	NC State*	NCSU 2–0, UNC 2–1, Duke 1–1, WF 0–3	NCSU 30–27^{2OT}	UNC 38–35	UNC 36–34	—N/a	NCSU 30–21	Duke 34–31
2023	Duke†*	Duke 2–1, NCSU 2–1, UNC 1–1, WF 0–2	NCSU 39–20	UNC 47–45^{2OT}	—N/a	Duke 24–3	NCSU 26–6	Duke 24–21
2024	Duke	Duke 3–0, NCSU 1–2, UNC 1–2, WF 1–2	NCSU 35–30	Duke 21–20	UNC 31–24	Duke 29–19	WF 34–30	Duke 23–17
2025	Duke	Duke 3–0, NCSU 2–1, WF 1–2, UNC 0–3	NCSU 42–19	Duke 32–25	WF 28–12	Duke 45–33	NCSU 34–24	Duke 49–32
2026	TBD*	WF 1–0, UNC 1–0, Duke 1–1, NCSU 0–2	November 28	UNC 24–20	—N/a	Duke 41–3	WF 38–14	November 28

† indicates tiebreakers are determined by who won head-to-head matchup. With no trophy, it is possible to split the title 3 or 4 ways

- Indicates years where not all contests were held
- The 2020 UNC-Wake Forest Game did not count as an ACC Conference Win

Records
Team	Championships	Championship years	Shared Champs	Shared Champs Years
North Carolina	31	1928, 1929, 1930, 1931, 1934, 1937, 1947†, 1948, 1949, 1959, 1963, 1964†, 1971, 1972, 1976†, 1977, 1980, 1981, 1983, 1993, 1994, 1995, 1996, 1997, 1998, 2004*, 2011†*, 2015*, 2020, 2021†*	9	1925, 1926, 1940, 1942, 1946*, 1979, 1982, 2001, 2005*
Duke	28	1932, 1933, 1935, 1936, 1938, 1939, 1941, 1943*, 1944†*, 1945*, 1952*, 1953, 1954, 1955, 1956, 1958, 1960†, 1961, 1962, 1969, 1985†, 1989, 2012*, 2013*, 2017*, 2023†*, 2024, 2025	3	1940, 1942, 1982
NC State	20	1927, 1957, 1965†, 1966*, 1967, 1968, 1973, 1978, 1986, 1988, 1990, 1991, 1992, 2000, 2002, 2008*, 2010*, 2014*, 2016*, 2022*	7	1925, 1926, 1942, 1946*, 1979, 1982, 2001
Wake Forest	14	1924, 1950, 1951, 1970, 1975, 1984, 1987, 1999†, 2003†, 2006*, 2007*, 2009*, 2018*, 2019*	7	1925, 1926, 1940, 1942, 1979, 2001, 2005*

== Baseball ==
In baseball, the four schools won a combined 15 ACC Baseball Tournaments (UNC won 6, NC State and Wake won 4, Duke won 1). In the College World Series, Wake Forest held the only national championship of any ACC school while a member of the ACC in 1955 until Virginia won it in 2015. Other schools have national championships, but all came before joining the ACC, or since leaving the ACC in the case of South Carolina. Wake was the runner-up in 1949, while UNC was the runner-up in 2006, 2007, and 2026.

== Soccer ==
In men's soccer, the four schools have won a combined four national titles (UNC has 2, Wake has 1, Duke has 1), five NCAA runners-up (Duke with 2, UNC with 1, NC State with 1, Wake Forest with 1), 11 ACC Tournament titles, and won or shared 7 ACC regular season titles. Women's soccer has produced much more success among the four schools. On the national level, they have combined for 21 national championships (UNC won all 21), six NCAA runners-up (UNC with 3, Duke with 2, NC State with 1). Tobacco Road teams have won 22 ACC tournaments since its inception in 1987. The years not won by a Tobacco Road team are 1987, 2004, 2011, 2012, and 2013. They have also won or shared 20 ACC regular season titles since 1987. UNC's 21 national titles in women's soccer are the most among Division 1 schools.

== Lacrosse ==
Only Duke and North Carolina currently compete in men's and women's lacrosse, though NC State had a program in the 1970s and 1980s. The current two Tobacco Road competitors have had a significant presence on the national stage, as the Blue Devils have won three national titles (2010, 2013, 2014), while the Tar Heels lay claim to five (1981, 1982, 1986, 1991, 2016). Duke and North Carolina have met 81 times, with UNC leading the rivalry 44–37 through 2024. However, Duke leads the ACC and NCAA postseason series by records of 9–4 and 4–0 respectively. For further information, see Duke–North Carolina lacrosse rivalry.

== Overall team national championships ==
As of 2020, the four schools have combined to win 73 NCAA team national championships in both men's and women's sports.

== See also ==
- Duke–North Carolina rivalry
- Duke–Wake Forest football rivalry
- North Carolina–NC State rivalry
- NC State–Wake Forest rivalry
- North Carolina–Wake Forest rivalry
