= Everett Case =

American basketball player and coach

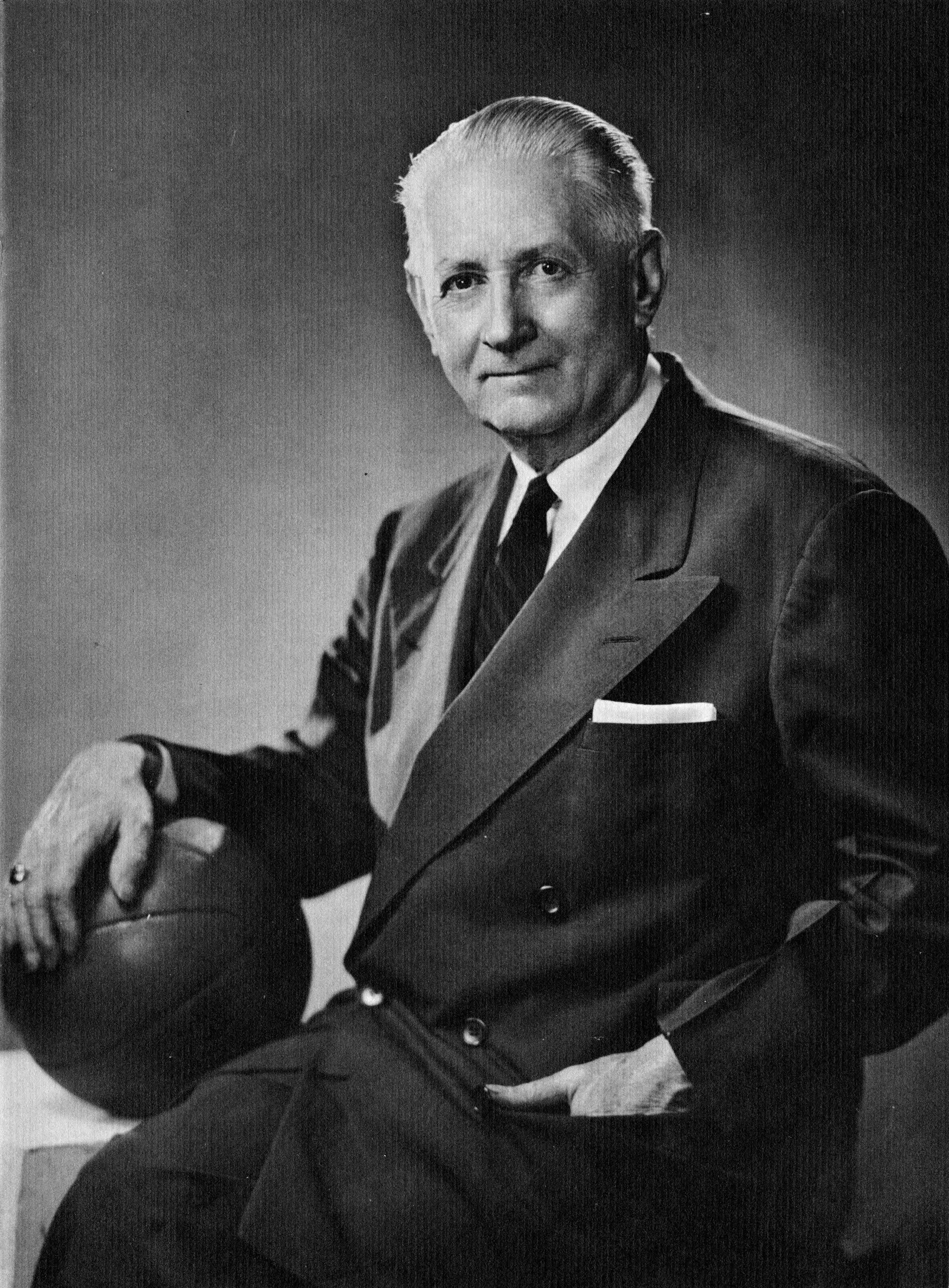

Biographical details
- Born: June 21, 1900; Anderson, Indiana, U.S.
- Died: April 30, 1966 (aged 65); Raleigh, North Carolina, U.S.

Coaching career (HC unless noted)
- 1946–1964: NC State

Head coaching record
- Overall: 377–134

Accomplishments and honors

Championships
- NCAA Regional—Final Four (1950); 6 SoCon (1947–1952); 4 ACC tournament (1954–1956, 1959)

Awards
- 3× ACC Coach of the Year (1954, 1955, 1958); 3× SoCon Coach of the Year (1947, 1949, 1951)
- Basketball Hall of Fame; Inducted in 1982
- College Basketball Hall of Fame; Inducted in 2006

Everett Norris Case (June 21, 1900 – April 30, 1966), nicknamed the "Old Gray Fox", was a basketball coach most notable for his tenure at North Carolina State University, from 1946 to 1964, and was inducted into the Naismith Basketball Hall of Fame in 1982.

== Early life and career ==
Born in Anderson, Indiana, Case graduated from the University of Wisconsin–Madison in 1923. He compiled a 726–75 record while coaching 23 years in high school basketball, including winning 4 Indiana state championships while coaching in Frankfort, Indiana (1925, 1929, 1936, 1939). Frankfort's Case Arena is named after him. Case is one of only five coaches to win at least 4 state titles in Indiana basketball (the others being Marion Crawley, Glenn M. Curtis, and Jack Keefer with 4 and Bill Green with 6).

Case enlisted in the U.S. Navy in 1941. He was commissioned a senior-grade lieutenant and reported to Annapolis for a four-week training course. He then traveled to Chicago for five weeks training before reporting to Naval Pre-flight school at St. Mary's College in California, where he served as assistant athletic director and director of basketball. He also served as athletic director at the Alameda Naval Air Station.

In 1943, DePauw University began a naval flight preparatory school. An abbreviated basketball schedule was used, and Case, now a lieutenant commander, became the athletic director of the program.

== At North Carolina State University ==
Upon leaving the Navy in 1946, Case assumed coaching duties at N.C. State. In 18 years, he compiled a 377–134 (.737) record—still the best in school history. He won nine straight conference titles from 1946 to 1955. He won six straight Southern Conference titles before the Wolfpack joined most of the SoCon's other large schools in forming the Atlantic Coast Conference, and then led the Wolfpack to win the ACC's first three conference titles. He added a fourth in 1959. Case himself was aptly rewarded, earning three ACC Coach of the Year awards, in 1954, 1955 and 1958. Case's teams finished third in the 1947 NIT and third in the 1950 NCAA tournament. The ACC tournament's Most Valuable Player award is named in his honor.

N.C. State had already begun construction on Reynolds Coliseum in 1941, but all work stopped during World War II. Case persuaded the administration to build a 12,400-seat arena, instead of the 10,000-seat facility originally planned. The ACC's basketball tournament was largely Case's idea, with Reynolds Coliseum hosting the first 13 ACC tournaments from 1954 through 1966. It was Case's idea to get the ACC to recognize the tournament winner as the conference champion—and thus the winner of the conference's lone berth in the NCAA tournament. From 1949 to 1960, it also hosted the Dixie Classic, a holiday tournament that quickly ascended to the top of the state's sporting calendar. Case's teams went on to win seven Dixie Classic titles.

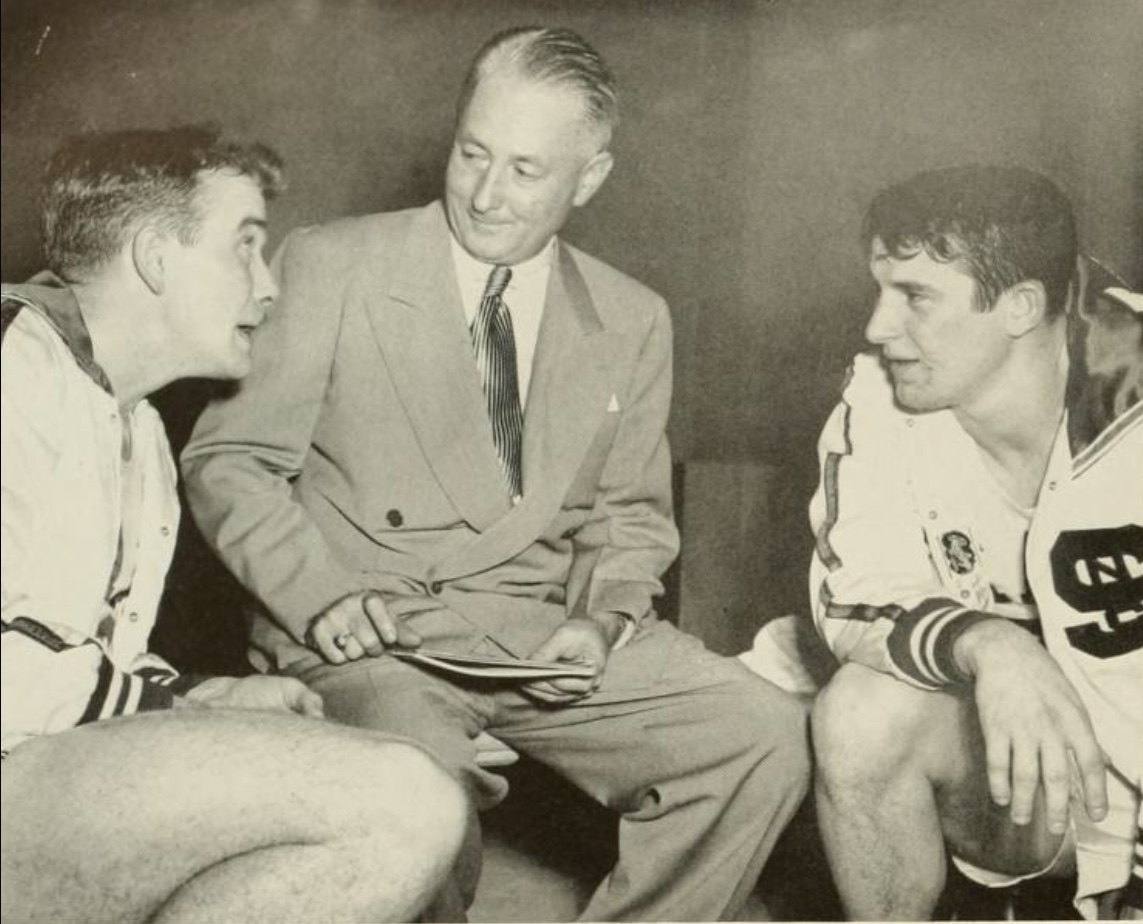
Case with players circa 1950

When Case came to Raleigh, North Carolina was, like most states in the South, enraptured by college football. However, he is largely credited with making basketball a craze in the state. For example, in his first year in Raleigh, the fire marshal canceled a game because people were spilling onto the floor of tiny Thompson Gymnasium and climbing in through windows. The other three schools along Tobacco Road--Duke, North Carolina and Wake Forest—responded by upgrading their facilities and recruiting budgets to counter the "red menace" in Raleigh. Case is also credited with introducing such practices as cutting down the nets after a championship and shining a spotlight on players as they were introduced.

For a time, it looked as if the Wolfpack would dominate the ACC in the same fashion that Kentucky dominated the Southeastern Conference. However, the Wolfpack's momentum was derailed in 1956, when the NCAA placed N.C. State on four years' probation. Case reportedly had his top assistant coach and State's assistant athletic director give Louisiana high school athlete Jackie Moreland cash and gifts to entice him away from his previous agreement to attend Kentucky—a charge he denied. The NCAA, however, found that Case not only knew about the gifts to Moreland—which included a seven-year medical education—but expressly approved them. Just as that probation ended in 1960, State was placed on probation again—this time for a point-shaving scandal that caused the cancellation of the Dixie Classic.

By this time, Case was in failing health. He began the 1964–65 season even though he was suffering from inoperable cancer. However, only two games into the season, it was obvious he was unable to continue, and he stepped down in favor of assistant Press Maravich. He soon needed to use a wheelchair; when the Wolfpack won the 1965 ACC tournament, they wheeled him over from press row so he could cut the last strand of the net. He died a year later, and was interred at Raleigh Memorial Park in Raleigh. Case instructed that his body be laid facing US Highway 70 so he could "wave" to later Wolfpack teams as they traveled to Durham and Chapel Hill.

== Legacy ==
Case was inducted into the Indiana Basketball Hall of Fame in 1968, the Naismith Basketball Hall of Fame on May 3, 1982, the North Carolina Sports Hall of Fame in 1964, and the inaugural class of the NC State Athletic Hall of Fame in 2012. N.C. State's main athletics office is named for him.

In 2011 The Classic: How Everett Case and His Tournament Brought Big-Time Basketball to the South (ISBN 978-0-9836825-2-3) by Bethany Bradsher was published, telling the story of the Dixie Classic basketball tournament with an emphasis on Case's contributions.

In 2018, a historic marker was erected on Frankfort High School, 1 S. Maish Rd., Frankfort by Indiana Historical Bureau and Community Schools of Frankfort.

== Head coaching record ==
Record table
Season	Team	Overall	Conference	Standing	Postseason
NC State Wolfpack (Southern Conference) (1946–1953)
1946–47	NC State	26–5	11–2	1st	NIT Semifinal
1947–48	NC State	29–3	12–0	1st	NIT Quarterfinal
1948–49	NC State	25–8	14–1	1st	
1949–50	NC State	27–6	12–2	1st	NCAA Third Place
1950–51	NC State	30–7	13–1	1st	NCAA Regional Fourth Place
1951–52	NC State	24–10	12–2	2nd	NCAA round of 16
1952–53	NC State	26–6	13–3	1st	
NC State Wolfpack (Atlantic Coast Conference) (1953–1964)
1953–54	NC State	26–7	5–3	4th	NCAA Regional Fourth Place
1954–55	NC State	28–4	12–2	1st	
1955–56	NC State	24–4	11–3	1st	NCAA East Region Quarterfinal
1956–57	NC State	15–11	7–7	T–4th	
1957–58	NC State	18–6	10–4	3rd	
1958–59	NC State	22–4	12–2	T–1st	
1959–60	NC State	11–15	5–9	6th	
1960–61	NC State	16–9	8–6	4th	
1961–62	NC State	11–6	10–4	3rd	
1962–63	NC State	10–11	5–9	T–4th	
1963–64	NC State	8–11	4–10	T–7th	
NC State:		377–134	176–70		
Total:		377–134			
National champion Postseason invitational champion Conference regular season champion Conference regular season and conference tournament champion Division regular season champion Division regular season and conference tournament champion Conference tournament champion

== See also ==
- List of NCAA Division I Men's Final Four appearances by coach
