= 1997 ACC men's basketball tournament =

- Classification: Division I
- Season: 1996–97
- Teams: 9
- Site: Charlotte, North Carolina; Charlotte Coliseum
- Champions: North Carolina (14th title)
- Winning coach: Dean Smith (13th title)
- MVP: Shammond Williams (North Carolina)

1996–97 ACC men's basketball standings
	Conf.				Overall
Team	W		L	PCT	W		L	PCT
No. 8 Duke	12	–	4	.750	24	–	9	.727
No. 9 Wake Forest	11	–	5	.688	24	–	7	.774
No. 4 North Carolina †	11	–	5	.688	28	–	7	.800
No. 14 Clemson	9	–	7	.563	23	–	10	.697
No. 22 Maryland	9	–	7	.563	21	–	11	.656
Virginia	7	–	9	.438	18	–	13	.581
Florida State	6	–	10	.375	20	–	12	.625
NC State	4	–	12	.250	17	–	15	.531
Georgia Tech	3	–	13	.188	9	–	18	.333
† 1997 ACC tournament winner Rankings from AP poll

The 1997 Atlantic Coast Conference men's basketball tournament took place from March 6 to 9 in Greensboro, North Carolina, at the Greensboro Coliseum. In what turned out to be Dean Smith's last season of coaching, North Carolina won the tournament, defeating a surprising NC State team in the final.

NC State became the first team in ACC history to advance past the quarterfinal round after playing in the First Round game. The ACC adopted the first-round game format in 1992 when Florida State joined the conference. After defeating top seed Duke in the quarterfinals, NC State beat fifth-seeded Maryland to advance to the championship game. Their Cinderella run through the tournament ended against rival North Carolina in the final. The 1997 NC State Wolfpack became the first team to play four games in the ACC Tournament and remained the lowest-seeded team to make the Tournament final until 2007.

Shammond Williams of North Carolina was named tournament MVP.

== Bracket ==
First round March 6
8	NC State	60
9	Georgia Tech	46

Quarterfinals; March 7
1	#7 Duke	60
8	NC State	66
4	#13 Clemson	61
5	#22 Maryland	76
2	#8 Wake Forest	66
7	Florida State	65
3	#5 North Carolina	78
6	Virginia	68

Semifinals; March 8
8	NC State	65
5	#22 Maryland	58
2	#8 Wake Forest	73
3	#5 North Carolina	86

Championship Game; March 9
8	NC State	54
3	#5 North Carolina	64

AP rankings at time of tournament

== Awards and honors ==
=== Everett Case Award ===
Player	School
Shammond Williams	North Carolina

=== All Tournament Teams ===
==== First Team ====
Player	School
Tim Duncan	Wake Forest
Justin Gainey	NC State
C. C. Harrison	NC State
Antawn Jamison	North Carolina
Shammond Williams	North Carolina

==== Second Team ====
Player	School
Keith Booth	Maryland
Ed Cota	North Carolina
Jeremy Hyatt	NC State
Danny Strong	NC State
Serge Zwikker	North Carolina
