= List of NC State Wolfpack men's basketball head coaches =

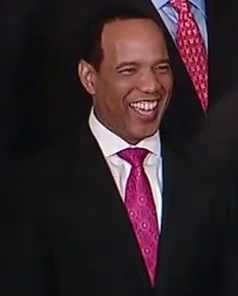
Kevin Keatts, former head coach of the NC State.

The following is a list of NC State Wolfpack men's basketball head coaches. There have been 20 head coaches of the NC State men's Wolfpack Basketball Team in their 113-season history.

NC State's current head coach is Justin Gainey. He was hired as the Wolfpack's head coach on March 31, 2026, replacing Will Wade, who left for LSU in March 2025 following the First Four exit for the Wolfpack in the NCAA Tournament.

No.	Tenure	Coach	Years	Record	Pct.
1	1910–1912	Piggy Hargrove	2	1–7	.125
2	1912–1913; 1915–1916	Chuck Sandborn	2	11–13	.458
3	1913–1914	Jack Hegarty	1	5–8	.385
4	1914–1915	H. S. Tucker	1	5–5	.500
5	1916–1918; 1921–1923	Harry Hartsell	4	32–32	.500
6	1918–1919	Tal Stafford	1	11–3	.786
7	1919–1921; 1923–1924	Richard Crozier	3	24–35	.407
8	1924–1930	Gus Tebell	6	79–36	.687
9	1930–1940	R. R. Sermon	10	111–74	.600
10	1940–1942	Bob Warren	2	21–16	.568
11	1942–1946	Leroy Jay	4	28–45	.384
12	1946–1964 (Note: Case retired two games into the 1964–65 season. Press Maravich took over as permanent head coach.)	Everett Case	19	377–134	.738
13	1964–1966	Press Maravich	2	38–13	.745
14	1966–1980	Norm Sloan	14	266–127	.677
15	1980–1990	Jim Valvano	10	209–114	.647
16	1990–1996	Les Robinson	6	78–98	.443
17	1996–2006	Herb Sendek	10	191–132	.591
18	2006–2011	Sidney Lowe	5	71–62	.534
19	2011–2017	Mark Gottfried	6	123–86	.589
20	2017–2025	Kevin Keatts	8	151–113	.572
21	2025–2026	Will Wade	1	20–14	.588
22	2026–Present	Justin Gainey	0	0–0	–
Totals		22 coaches	115 seasons	1,840–1,148	.616
Records updated through end of 2025–26 season Source
