= 1996–97 North Carolina Tar Heels men's basketball team =

American college basketball season

1996–97 North Carolina Tar Heels men's basketball

ACC tournament champions

NCAA tournament, Final Four
- Conference: Atlantic Coast Conference

Ranking
- Coaches: No. 4
- AP: No. 4
- Record: 28–7 (11–5 ACC)
- Head coach: Dean Smith (36th season)
- Assistant coaches: Bill Guthridge (30th season); Phil Ford (9th season); Dave Hanners (7th season)
- Home arena: Dean Smith Center

1996–97 ACC men's basketball standings
	Conf.				Overall
Team	W		L	PCT	W		L	PCT
No. 8 Duke	12	–	4	.750	24	–	9	.727
No. 9 Wake Forest	11	–	5	.688	24	–	7	.774
No. 4 North Carolina †	11	–	5	.688	28	–	7	.800
No. 14 Clemson	9	–	7	.563	23	–	10	.697
No. 22 Maryland	9	–	7	.563	21	–	11	.656
Virginia	7	–	9	.438	18	–	13	.581
Florida State	6	–	10	.375	20	–	12	.625
NC State	4	–	12	.250	17	–	15	.531
Georgia Tech	3	–	13	.188	9	–	18	.333
† 1997 ACC tournament winner Rankings from AP poll

The 1996–97 North Carolina Tar Heels men's basketball team represented the University of North Carolina at Chapel Hill during the 1996–97 NCAA Division I men's basketball season. The team was led by head coach Dean Smith in his 36th and final season at the school. The team played its home games in the Dean Smith Center in Chapel Hill, North Carolina, as a member of the Atlantic Coast Conference.

== Roster ==
1996–97 North Carolina Tar Heels men's basketball team
Players
Coaches

Pos.	#	Name	Height	Weight	Year	Previous school	Hometown
G	3	Shammond Williams	6 ft 3 in (1.91 m)	189 lb (86 kg)	Jr	Fork Union Military	Greenville, South Carolina
F	4	Makhtar N'Diaye	6 ft 10 in (2.08 m)	231 lb (105 kg)	Jr	Oak Hill Academy	Dakar, Senegal
G	5	Ed Cota	6 ft 1 in (1.85 m)	185 lb (84 kg)	Fr	Samuel J. Tilden	Brooklyn, New York
F/C	13	Ademola Okulaja	6 ft 9 in (2.06 m)	235 lb (107 kg)	So	John F. Kennedy High School	Berlin, Germany
G/F	15	Vince Carter	6 ft 6 in (1.98 m)	215 lb (98 kg)	So	Mainland High School	Daytona Beach, Florida
G	21	Terrence Newby	6 ft 2 in (1.88 m)	210 lb (95 kg)	Fr	Jordan-Matthews	Siler City, North Carolina
G	22	Scott Williams	5 ft 11 in (1.8 m)	156 lb (71 kg)	So	Lawrence	Lawrence, Kansas
F/C	33	Antawn Jamison	6 ft 9 in (2.06 m)	223 lb (101 kg)	So	Providence	Charlotte, North Carolina

Head coach

Dean Smith

Assistant coach(es)

- Bill Guthridge
- Phil Ford
- Dave Hanners

Legend

- (C) Team captain
- (S) Suspended
- (I) Ineligible
- (W) Walk-on
- Injured
- Current redshirt

== Schedule and results ==
Date time, TV	Rank^{#}	Opponent^{#}	Result	Record	Site city, state
Regular season
Nov 22, 1996*	No. 7	vs. No. 19 Arizona; Hall of Fame Tip-Off Classic	L 72–83	0–1	Springfield Civic Center; Springfield, MA
Nov 25, 1996*	No. 7	at Richmond	W 86–75	1–1	Dean Smith Center; Chapel Hill, NC
Nov 29, 1996*	No. 14	at Pittsburgh	W 82–61	2–1	Dean Smith Center; Chapel Hill, NC
Dec 2, 1996*	No. 14	at Bethune-Cookman	W 106–62	3–1	Dean Smith Center; Chapel Hill, NC
Dec 6, 1996*	No. 14	vs. USC	W 99–84	4–1	Charlotte Coliseum; Charlotte, NC
Dec 7, 1996*	No. 14	vs. South Carolina	W 86–75	5–1	Charlotte Coliseum; Charlotte, NC
Dec 15, 1996*	No. 11	at VMI	W 105–61	6–1	Cameron Hall; Lexington, VA
Dec 18, 1996*	No. 12	vs. LSU	W 67–48	7–1	Greensboro Coliseum; Greensboro, NC
Dec 20, 1996*	No. 12	vs. UMass	W 83–69	8–1	Continental Airlines Arena; East Rutherford, NJ
Dec 22, 1996*	No. 12	at Princeton	W 69–60	9–1	Jadwin Gymnasium; Princeton, NJ
Jan 4, 1997	No. 11	at No. 2 Wake Forest	L 57–81	9–2 (0–1)	Lawrence Joel Coliseum; Winston-Salem, NC
Jan 8, 1997	No. 13	No. 19 Maryland	L 75–85	9–3 (0–2)	Dean Smith Center; Chapel Hill, NC
Jan 11, 1997	No. 13	at Virginia	L 63–75	9–4 (0–3)	University Hall; Charlottesville, VA
Jan 15, 1997	No. 22	NC State	W 59–56	10–4 (1–3)	Dean Smith Center; Chapel Hill, NC
Jan 18, 1997	No. 22	Georgia Tech	W 73–50	11–4 (2–3)	Dean Smith Center; Chapel Hill, NC
Jan 22, 1997	No. 19	Florida State	L 71–84	11–5 (2–4)	Donald L. Tucker Center; Tallahassee, FL
Jan 26, 1997	No. 19	No. 2 Clemson	W 61–48	12–5 (3–4)	Dean Smith Center; Chapel Hill, NC
Jan 29, 1997	No. 19	at No. 12 Duke	L 73–80	12–6 (3–5)	Cameron Indoor Stadium; Durham, NC
Feb 1, 1997*	No. 19	Middle Tennessee	W 99–49	13–6	Dean Smith Center; Chapel Hill, NC
Feb 6, 1997	No. 20	Florida State	W 90–62	14–6 (4–5)	Dean Smith Center; Chapel Hill, NC
Feb 8, 1997	No. 20	Virginia	W 81–57	15–6 (5–5)	Dean Smith Center; Chapel Hill, NC
Feb 12, 1997	No. 16	at NC State	W 45–44	16–6 (6–5)	Reynolds Coliseum; Raleigh, NC
Feb 15, 1997	No. 16	at Georgia Tech	W 72–68	17–6 (7–5)	Alexander Memorial Coliseum; Atlanta, GA
Feb 19, 1997	No. 12	No. 4 Wake Forest	W 74–60	18–6 (8–5)	Dean Smith Center; Chapel Hill, NC
Feb 22, 1997	No. 12	at No. 14 Maryland	W 93–81	19–6 (9–5)	Cole Fieldhouse; College Park, MD
Feb 26, 1997	No. 8	at No. 12 Clemson	W 76–69	20–6 (10–5)	Littlejohn Coliseum; Clemson, SC
Mar 2, 1997	No. 8	No. 7 Duke	W 91–85	21–6 (11–5)	Dean Smith Center; Chapel Hill, NC
ACC tournament
Mar 7, 1997	(3) No. 5	(6) Virginia; Quarterfinals	W 78–68	22–6	Greensboro Coliseum; Greensboro, NC
Mar 8, 1997	(3) No. 5	(2) No. 8 Wake Forest; Semifinals	W 86–73	23–6	Greensboro Coliseum; Greensboro, NC
Mar 9, 1997	(3) No. 5	(8) NC State; Championship	W 64–54	24–6	Greensboro Coliseum; Greensboro, NC
NCAA tournament
Mar 13, 1997	(1 E) No. 4	(16 E) Fairfield; First round	W 82–74	25–6	Lawrence Joel Coliseum; Winston-Salem, NC
Mar 15, 1997	(1 E) No. 4	(9 E) No. 24 Colorado; Second Round	W 73–56	26–6	Lawrence Joel Coliseum; Winston-Salem, NC
Mar 21, 1997	(1 E) No. 4	(5 E) California; Sweet Sixteen	W 63–57	27–6	Carrier Dome; Syracuse, NY
Mar 23, 1997	(1 E) No. 4	(6 E) No. 25 Louisville; Elite Eight	W 97–74	28–6	Carrier Dome; Syracuse, NY
Mar 29, 1997*	(1 E) No. 4	vs. (4 SE) No. 15 Arizona; Final Four	L 58–66	28–7	RCA Dome; Indianapolis, IN
*Non-conference game. ^{#}Rankings from AP Poll. (#) Tournament seedings in parentheses. E=East region. All times are in Eastern Time.
