= Chuck Kornegay =

Spanish basketball player (born 1974)

Personal information
- Born: 28 September 1974 (age 52) Dudley, North Carolina, U.S.
- Listed height: 2.06 m (6 ft 9 in)
- Listed weight: 107 kg (236 lb)

Career information
- High school: Southern Wayne (Dudley, North Carolina)
- College: NC State (1992–1993); Villanova (1994–1997)
- NBA draft: 1997: undrafted
- Playing career: 1997–2010
- Position: Power forward / center

Career history
- 1997–1998: Raleigh Cougars
- 1998: Brisbane Bullets
- 1998–1999: CDB Sevilla
- 1999–2000: Baloncesto Fuenlabrada
- 2000–2001: CDB Sevilla
- 2001–2004: Unicaja
- 2004–2005: MBC Dynamo Moscow
- 2005–2006: Menorca Bàsquet
- 2006: Beşiktaş J.K.
- 2006–2007: CB Lucentum Alicante
- 2007–2008: CB Alcúdia
- 2008–2009: Estadio Unión Atletica
- 2009–2010: Obras Sanitarias

Career highlights
- All-NBL Second Team (1998); Third-team Parade All-American (1992)

Charles MacArthur Kornegay Uzzell (né Kornegay Jr.; born 28 September 1974) is a former professional basketball player. Born in the United States, he played for the Spain national team. The 2.06 m, 107 kg power forward gained notoriety at Villanova University, before going on to star for the Raleigh Cougars of the USBL, and ultimately overseas. Cougars fans called him the "Chuck-wagon", "Chuck Diesel" and "Korn-dawg".

== Basketball career ==
As a basketball standout at Southern Wayne High School in Dudley, North Carolina, Kornegay was heavily recruited by American universities. He signed with nearby school, North Carolina State University. He played at NCSU for the Wolfpack during the 1993–1994 season, before transferring to Villanova University in suburban Philadelphia, Pennsylvania. He played there for three seasons and led the Wildcats to the Big East conference championships in 1995 and 1997. During his career at Villanova, the team won 70 of 93 games and was rated as high as #2 nationally by the Associated Press. He ended his collegiate career with averages of 7.3 points per game and 5.6 rebounds per game.

After graduation, Kornegay was selected by the Yakima Sun Kings in the 3rd round with the 28th overall pick of the 1997 CBA draft. Instead of joining the CBA, Kornegay returned to his home state of North Carolina to star for the Raleigh Cougars in the 1997–1998 season, forming a formidable frontline with Lorenzo Charles and Greg Newton.

In 1998, Kornegay played professional basketball in Australia for the Brisbane Bullets of the NBL. After his stint down under, Kornegay moved to Spain, and played for a number of teams there before eventually hanging on with the Spanish team Unicaja Malaga of the Euroleague. He patrolled the pivot there from 2001 to 2004, and even represented Spain in their 3rd-place run through the 2001 European Basketball Championship in Turkey. In 2005, Kornegay returned to Turkey to play for Besiktas ColaTurka of the Turkish Basketball League (TBL). After his stint in Turkey, Kornegay moved back to Spain to play for Etosa Alicante. He coaches annually at his old college, Villanova, for summer basketball camp. The team he coached at the camp won the high school championship in 2012.

In September 2015, Kornegay was announced as Basketball Coach at Souderton (PA) HS.

== Achievements ==
- 1997 Villanova University defensive player of the year
- 1997 USBL All-Rookie Team
- 1998 named to second team all nbl (Australia)
- 1999 appeared in acb league finals
- 2001 Won Bronze at European Basketball Championship
- 2001 appeared in acb league finals
- 2002–2003 Led Euroleague in Blocked Shots
- 1999–2000 voted acb league most exciting player
- 2004 appeared in acb league finals
