= Raleigh Cougars =

American basketball team

- League: USBL 1997–1999
- Founded: 1997
- History: Raleigh Cougars; 1997–1999
- Arena: Dorton Arena
- Location: Raleigh, North Carolina
- Championships: 0

The Raleigh Cougars was a United States Basketball League team based in Raleigh, North Carolina from 1997 to 1999. The team included many well known players from local colleges. The team played its home games at Dorton Arena. The Cougars were owned by Clyde "The Glide" Austin, a former Harlem Globetrotters and North Carolina State basketball star, and Cozell McQueen, a former North Carolina State and Euroleague player.

== History ==
In 1997 the team finished with a 14–12 record and advanced to the semifinals of the USBL Postseason Festival, where they lost to Atlantic City. In 1998, they had an 11–14 record and were eliminated in round one of the Festival. In 1999, their final year, the team finished with a 5–21 record.

== Notable players ==
- Lorenzo Charles (a.k.a. "Zo") of the famous national champion N.C. State wolfpack. 6' 7" Forward.
- Greg Newton - 6' 11" Center Duke University. Cougars literature noted that Mr. Newton was 1 away from Duke's all-time top 10 in blocks. (This is no longer the case).
- Amere May - After averaging 13 points per game, Amere left Division II Shaw University early to declare for the 1997 NBA draft. Was quoted by Sports Illustrated as saying that he thought no one in the NBA could stop his game. One observer quipped that he was right - no one in the NBA ever would stop his game. Amere was a strong performer off the bench for the Cougars.
- Chuck Kornegay - Powerful big man from Villanova University (he transferred there from NC State). Cougars fans dubbed him "the Chuck-wagon", a la NBA star Charles Barkley.
- Nate Higgs - Cheered on by the crowd: "Come on Nate-Dawg! You're better than that!"
- Jeremy Hyatt - 6' 6" sharpshooter from NC State
- Donald Williams - 6' 3" North Carolina guard.

== Trivia ==
- The Cougars drafted National Basketball Association superstar Tracy McGrady in the fourth round of the 1997 USBL draft.
