= Clyde the Glide =

Clyde the Glide may refer to:

- Clyde Austin, American basketball player
- Clyde Drexler, American basketball player
