= 1996–97 Wake Forest Demon Deacons men's basketball team =

American college basketball season

1996–97 Wake Forest Demon Deacons men's basketball

NCAA men's Division I tournament, second round
- Conference: Atlantic Coast Conference

Ranking
- Coaches: No. 9
- AP: No. 9
- Record: 24–7 (11–5 ACC)
- Head coach: Dave Odom (8th season)
- Assistant coaches: Ricky Stokes; Russell Turner
- Home arena: Lawrence Joel Coliseum

1996–97 ACC men's basketball standings
	Conf.				Overall
Team	W		L	PCT	W		L	PCT
No. 8 Duke	12	–	4	.750	24	–	9	.727
No. 9 Wake Forest	11	–	5	.688	24	–	7	.774
No. 4 North Carolina †	11	–	5	.688	28	–	7	.800
No. 14 Clemson	9	–	7	.563	23	–	10	.697
No. 22 Maryland	9	–	7	.563	21	–	11	.656
Virginia	7	–	9	.438	18	–	13	.581
Florida State	6	–	10	.375	20	–	12	.625
NC State	4	–	12	.250	17	–	15	.531
Georgia Tech	3	–	13	.188	9	–	18	.333
† 1997 ACC tournament winner Rankings from AP poll

The 1996–97 Wake Forest Demon Deacons men's basketball team represented Wake Forest University in the 1996–97 NCAA Division I men's basketball season. The team was led by 8th year head coach Dave Odom, and played their home games at LJVM Coliseum.

The Deacons finished second in the ACC regular season standings, but were unable to three-peat as champions of the ACC tournament. After a close win over Florida State in the quarterfinals, North Carolina eliminated Wake Forest in the semifinal round. The team was assigned the No. 3 seed in the West region of the NCAA tournament, and earned a victory over Saint Mary's in the opening round before being upended by No. 6 seed Stanford in the round of 32. Wake Forest finished the season with a 24–7 overall record and, once again, a final ranking of No. 9 in both major polls.

Senior forward/center Tim Duncan was named the consensus National Player of the Year, and repeated as ACC Player of the Year and a consensus First-team All-American. Duncan was taken with the No. 1 overall pick in the 1997 NBA draft. Duncan's No. 21 jersey was retired after a February 25 victory over Georgia Tech.

== Previous season ==
Wake Forest finished second in the ACC regular season standings, then defeated Virginia, Clemson, and Georgia Tech to capture the ACC tournament crown for the second straight season. Wake Forest was assigned the No. 2 seed in the Midwest region of the NCAA tournament. After defeating No. 15 seed Louisiana–Monroe, No. 10 seed Texas, and No. 6 seed Louisville to reach the Elite Eight, the team was blown out by No. 1 seed and eventual National champion Kentucky in the regional final. Wake Forest finished the season with a 26–6 and a No. 9 ranking in both major polls.

Junior forward/center Tim Duncan was named ACC Player of the Year and a Consensus First-team All-American.

== Roster ==
1996–97 Wake Forest Demon Deacons men's basketball team
Players
Coaches

Pos.	#	Name	Height	Weight	Year	Previous school	Hometown
G	5	Steve Goolsby	6 ft 4 in (1.93 m)	194 lb (88 kg)	Jr	—	Marietta, GA
G	10	Cureton Johnson	6 ft 3 in (1.91 m)	—	Fr	—	—
G/F	11	Joseph Amonett	6 ft 5 in (1.96 m)	200 lb (91 kg)	So	Pickett County	Byrdstown, TN
C	13	Loren Woods	7 ft 1 in (2.16 m)	245 lb (111 kg)	Fr	Cardinal Ritter College Prep	St. Louis, Missouri
G	20	Marc Scott	6 ft 2 in (1.88 m)	185 lb (84 kg)	Sr	—	Chapel Hill, NC
F/C	21	Tim Duncan (C)	6 ft 11 in (2.11 m)	248 lb (112 kg)	Sr	St. Dunstan's Episcopal	Saint Croix, U.S. Virgin Islands
G	23	Tim Fuller	6 ft 4 in (1.93 m)	—	Fr	Woodbridge Senior	Woodbridge, VA
G	25	Jerry Braswell	6 ft 1 in (1.85 m)	180 lb (82 kg)	Jr	Randolph-Clay	Cuthbert, Georgia
G	30	Tony Rutland	6 ft 2 in (1.88 m)	183 lb (83 kg)	Jr	Bethel	Hampton, VA
C	33	Rodney West	6 ft 11 in (2.11 m)	—	So	—	Oneida, TN
C	40	Sean Allen	6 ft 8 in (2.03 m)	—	Sr	—	Raleigh, NC
F	44	Ricky Peral	6 ft 10 in (2.08 m)	230 lb (104 kg)	Sr	—	Valladolid, Spain
C	52	William Stringfellow	6 ft 8 in (2.03 m)	210 lb (95 kg)	So	Alief Hastings	Austin, TX
F	53	Ken Herbst	6 ft 7 in (2.01 m)	—	Sr	—	Winston-Salem, NC

Head coach

- Dave Odom

Assistant coach(es)

- Ricky Stokes

Legend

- (C) Team captain
- (S) Suspended
- (I) Ineligible
- (W) Walk-on
- Injured
- Current redshirt

Roster
Last update: March 24, 2020

== Schedule and results ==
Date time, TV	Rank^{#}	Opponent^{#}	Result	Record	Site city, state
Regular Season
Nov 24, 1996*	No. 3	VMI	W 92–63	1–0	Lawrence Joel Coliseum; Winston-Salem, North Carolina
Nov 25, 1996*	No. 3	at The Citadel	W 86–52	2–0	McAlister Field House; Charleston, South Carolina
Nov 29, 1996*	No. 3	Davidson	W 69–45	3–0	Lawrence Joel Coliseum; Winston-Salem, North Carolina
Dec 1, 1996*	No. 3	at Richmond	W 80–55	4–0	Robins Center; Richmond, Virginia
Dec 3, 1996*	No. 2	vs. Mississippi State	W 74–43	5–0	United Center; Chicago, Illinois
Dec 7, 1996	No. 2	at NC State	W 53–45	6–0 (1–0)	Reynolds Coliseum; Raleigh, North Carolina
Dec 14, 1996*	No. 2	UMass	W 71–47	7–0	Lawrence Joel Coliseum; Winston-Salem, North Carolina
Dec 21, 1996*	No. 2	Campbell	W 90–53	8–0	Lawrence Joel Coliseum; Winston-Salem, North Carolina
Dec 31, 1996*	No. 2	at No. 7 Utah	W 70–59	9–0	Jon M. Huntsman Center; Salt Lake City, Utah
Jan 4, 1997	No. 2	No. 11 North Carolina	W 81–57	10–0 (2–0)	Lawrence Joel Coliseum; Winston-Salem, North Carolina
Jan 8, 1997	No. 2	at Georgia Tech	W 73–63	11–0 (3–0)	Alexander Memorial Coliseum; Atlanta, Georgia
Jan 11, 1997	No. 2	at No. 10 Duke	W 81–69	12–0 (4–0)	Cameron Indoor Stadium; Durham, North Carolina
Jan 15, 1997	No. 2	Virginia	W 58–54	13–0 (5–0)	Lawrence Joel Coliseum; Winston-Salem, North Carolina
Jan 19, 1997	No. 2	No. 11 Maryland	L 51–54	13–1 (5–1)	Lawrence Joel Coliseum; Winston-Salem, North Carolina
Jan 23, 1997	No. 4	at No. 2 Clemson	W 65–62	14–1 (6–1)	Littlejohn Coliseum; Clemson, South Carolina
Jan 25, 1997	No. 4	Florida State	W 61–58	15–1 (7–1)	Lawrence Joel Coliseum; Winston-Salem, North Carolina
Jan 28, 1997*	No. 2	Virginia Tech	W 61–44	16–1	Lawrence Joel Coliseum; Winston-Salem, North Carolina
Jan 29, 1997*	No. 2	Wofford	W 68–51	17–1	Lawrence Joel Coliseum; Winston-Salem, North Carolina
Feb 1, 1997	No. 2	at No. 5 Maryland	W 74–69	18–1 (8–1)	Cole Fieldhouse; College Park, Maryland
Feb 5, 1997	No. 2	No. 8 Duke	L 68–73	18–2 (8–2)	Lawrence Joel Coliseum; Winston-Salem, North Carolina
Feb 9, 1997*	No. 2	at Missouri	W 73–65	19–2	Hearnes Center; Columbia, Missouri
Feb 12, 1997	No. 2	No. 7 Clemson	W 55–49	20–2 (9–2)	Lawrence Joel Coliseum; Winston-Salem, North Carolina
Feb 16, 1997	No. 2	NC State	L 59–60 ^{OT}	20–3 (9–3)	Lawrence Joel Coliseum; Winston-Salem, North Carolina
Feb 19, 1997	No. 4	at No. 12 North Carolina	L 60–74	20–4 (9–4)	Dean Smith Center; Chapel Hill, North Carolina
Feb 22, 1997	No. 4	at Virginia	W 66–60	21–4 (10–4)	University Hall; Charlottesville, Virginia
Feb 25, 1997	No. 5	Georgia Tech	W 71–55	22–4 (11–4)	Lawrence Joel Coliseum; Winston-Salem, NC
Mar 1, 1997	No. 5	at Florida State	L 55–59	22–5 (11–5)	Donald L. Tucker Center; Tallahassee, Florida
ACC Tournament
Mar 7, 1997*	No. 8	vs. Florida State; ACC Tournament Quarterfinal	W 66–65	23–5	Greensboro Coliseum; Greensboro, North Carolina
Mar 8, 1997*	No. 8	vs. No. 5 North Carolina; ACC Tournament Semifinal	L 73–86	23–6	Greensboro Coliseum; Greensboro, North Carolina
NCAA Tournament
Mar 14, 1997*	(3 W) No. 9	vs. (14 W) Saint Mary's; First round	W 68–46	24–6	McKale Center; Tucson, Arizona
Mar 16, 1997*	(3 W) No. 9	vs. (6 W) No. 21 Stanford; Second round	L 66–72	24–7	McKale Center; Tucson, Arizona
*Non-conference game. ^{#}Rankings from AP. (#) Tournament seedings in parentheses. W=West. All times are in EST.

== Awards and honors ==
- Tim Duncan, ACC Player of the Year
- Tim Duncan, Naismith College Player of the Year
- Tim Duncan, USBWA College Player of the Year
- Tim Duncan, John R. Wooden Award

== Team players drafted into the NBA ==
Round	Pick	Player	NBA Team
1	1	Tim Duncan	San Antonio Spurs
