= 1996–97 Maryland Terrapins men's basketball team =

American college basketball season

1996–97 Maryland Terrapins men's basketball

NCAA tournament, First Round
- Conference: Atlantic Coast Conference

Ranking
- AP: No. 22
- Record: 21–11 (9–7 ACC)
- Head coach: Gary Williams (8th season)
- Assistant coach: Billy Hahn; Dave Dickerson; Jimmy Patsos; Troy Wainwright
- Home arena: Cole Field House

1996–97 ACC men's basketball standings
	Conf.				Overall
Team	W		L	PCT	W		L	PCT
No. 8 Duke	12	–	4	.750	24	–	9	.727
No. 9 Wake Forest	11	–	5	.688	24	–	7	.774
No. 4 North Carolina †	11	–	5	.688	28	–	7	.800
No. 14 Clemson	9	–	7	.563	23	–	10	.697
No. 22 Maryland	9	–	7	.563	21	–	11	.656
Virginia	7	–	9	.438	18	–	13	.581
Florida State	6	–	10	.375	20	–	12	.625
NC State	4	–	12	.250	17	–	15	.531
Georgia Tech	3	–	13	.188	9	–	18	.333
† 1997 ACC tournament winner Rankings from AP poll

The 1996–97 Maryland Terrapins men's basketball team represented the University of Maryland in the 1996–1997 college basketball season as a member of the Atlantic Coast Conference (ACC). The team was led by head coach Gary Williams and played their home games at the Cole Field House. The team finished 21–11, 9–7 in ACC play and lost in the semifinals of the ACC tournament to NC State. They received an at-large bid as the number 5 seed in the Southeast region of the 1997 NCAA tournament, where they lost to College of Charleston in the opening round.

== Roster ==
1996–97 Maryland Terrapins men's basketball team
Players
Coaches

Pos.	#	Name	Height	Weight	Year	Hometown
G/F	3	Laron Profit	6 ft 5 in (1.96 m)	202 lb (92 kg)	So	Charleston, South Carolina
G	12	Terrell Stokes	6 ft 0 in (1.83 m)	187 lb (85 kg)	So	Philadelphia
G	13	Šarūnas Jasikevičius	6 ft 3 in (1.91 m)	200 lb (91 kg)	Jr
G	20	Matt Hahn	6 ft 0 in (1.83 m)	162 lb (73 kg)	Fr	Columbia, Maryland
F	22	Keith Booth	6 ft 6 in (1.98 m)	220 lb (100 kg)	Sr	Baltimore, Maryland
G	31	Norman Fields	6 ft 0 in (1.83 m)	185 lb (84 kg)	So	Mt. Vernon, New York
F/C	45	Brian Watkins	6 ft 9 in (2.06 m)	229 lb (104 kg)	So	Nashville, Tennessee
F/C	54	Obinna Ekezie	6 ft 10 in (2.08 m)	262 lb (119 kg)	So	Port Harcourt, Nigeria

Head coach

- Gary Williams (Maryland)

Assistant coach(es)

- Billy Hahn (Maryland)
- Dave Dickerson (Maryland)
- Jimmy Patsos (Catholic)
- Troy Wainwright (Maryland)

Legend

- (C) Team captain
- (S) Suspended
- (I) Ineligible
- (W) Walk-on
- Injured
- Current redshirt

Roster
Last update: 2021-06-26

== Schedule and results ==
Date time, TV	Rank^{#}	Opponent^{#}	Result	Record	Site (attendance) city, state
Regular season
Nov 26, 1996*		Howard	W 93–55	1–0	Cole Fieldhouse; College Park, Maryland
Nov 30, 1996*		Towson	W 93–76	2–0	Cole Fieldhouse; College Park, Maryland
Dec 2, 1996*		Chicago State	W 94–44	3–0	Cole Fieldhouse; College Park, Maryland
Dec 4, 1996*		UMBC	W 67–31	4–0	Cole Fieldhouse; College Park, Maryland
Dec 8, 1996*		California	W 80–64	5–0	Cole Fieldhouse; College Park, Maryland
Dec 9, 1996*		George Washington	W 74–68	6–0	Cole Fieldhouse; College Park, Maryland
Dec 12, 1996		Georgia Tech	W 77–63	7–0 (1–0)	Cole Fieldhouse; College Park, Maryland
Dec 21, 1996*	No. 25	American	W 81–74	8–0	Cole Fieldhouse; College Park, Maryland
Dec 23, 1996*	No. 21	Lafayette	W 108–67	9–0	Cole Fieldhouse; College Park, Maryland
Dec 27, 1996*	No. 21	vs. Pittsburgh; Rainbow Classic	W 66–63	10–0	Stan Sheriff Center; Honolulu, Hawaii
Dec 28, 1996*	No. 21	at Hawaii; Rainbow Classic	W 76–59	11–0	Stan Sheriff Center; Honolulu, Hawaii
Dec 29, 1996*	No. 21	vs. Georgia; Rainbow Classic	L 65–73 ^{OT}	11–1	Stan Sheriff Center; Honolulu, Hawaii
Jan 4, 1997	No. 19	Virginia	W 78–62	12–1 (2–0)	Cole Fieldhouse; College Park, Maryland
Jan 8, 1997	No. 19	at No. 13 North Carolina	W 85–75	13–1 (3–0)	Dean Smith Center; Chapel Hill, North Carolina
Jan 12, 1997	No. 11	at NC State	W 68–59	14–1 (4–0)	Reynolds Coliseum; Raleigh, North Carolina
Jan 15, 1997*	No. 11	No. 3 Clemson	L 63–67	14–2 (4–1)	Cole Fieldhouse; College Park, Maryland
Jan 19, 1997	No. 11	at No. 2 Wake Forest	W 54–51	15–2 (5–1)	Lawrence Joel Coliseum; Winston-Salem, North Carolina
Jan 21, 1997*	No. 7	Penn	W 103–73	16–2	Cole Fieldhouse; College Park, Maryland
Jan 26, 1997	No. 7	No. 10 Duke	W 74–70	17–2 (6–1)	Cole Fieldhouse; College Park, Maryland
Jan 29, 1997	No. 5	at Florida State	L 70–74	17–3 (6–2)	Donald L. Tucker Center; Tallahassee, Florida
Feb 1, 1997	No. 5	No. 2 Wake Forest	L 69–74	17–4 (6–3)	Cole Fieldhouse; College Park, Maryland
Feb 5, 1997*	No. 7	NC State	W 66–55	18–4 (7–3)	Cole Fieldhouse; College Park, Maryland
Feb 8, 1997	No. 7	at No. 10 Clemson	L 68–80	18–5 (7–4)	Littlejohn Coliseum; Clemson, South Carolina
Feb 13, 1997	No. 10	Florida State	W 73–57	19–5 (8–4)	Cole Fieldhouse; College Park, Maryland
Feb 15, 1997*	No. 10	vs. UMass	L 61–78	19–6	Centrum in Worcester (11,210); Worcester, Massachusetts
Feb 19, 1997	No. 14	at Georgia Tech	W 76–68	20–6 (9–4)	Alexander Memorial Coliseum; Atlanta, Georgia
Feb 22, 1997	No. 14	No. 12 North Carolina	L 81–93	20–7 (9–5)	Cole Fieldhouse; College Park, Maryland
Feb 27, 1997	No. 16	at No. 7 Duke	L 69–81	20–8 (9–6)	Cameron Indoor Stadium; Durham, North Carolina
Mar 2, 1997	No. 16	at Virginia	L 74–81	20–9 (9–7)	University Hall; Charlottesville, Virginia
ACC tournament
Mar 7, 1997*	No. 22	vs. No. 13 Clemson; Quarterfinals	W 76–61	21–9	Greensboro Coliseum; Greensboro, North Carolina
Mar 8, 1997*	No. 22	at NC State; Semifinals	L 58–65	21–10	Greensboro Coliseum; Greensboro, North Carolina
1999 NCAA Men's Basketball tournament
Mar 13, 1997*	(5 SE) No. 22	vs. (12 SE) No. 16 College of Charleston; First round	L 66–75	21–11	The Pyramid; Memphis, Tennessee
*Non-conference game. ^{#}Rankings from AP Poll. (#) Tournament seedings in parentheses. SE=Southeast. All times are in Eastern Time.
