= 1996–97 Virginia Cavaliers men's basketball team =

American college basketball season

1996–97 Virginia Cavaliers men's basketball

NCAA tournament, Round of 64
- Conference: Atlantic Coast Conference
- Record: 18–13 (7–9 ACC)
- Head coach: Jeff Jones (7th season)
- Assistant coaches: Anthony Solomon (3rd season); Tom Perrin (10th season); Pete Herrmann (3rd season)
- Home arena: University Hall

1996–97 ACC men's basketball standings
	Conf.				Overall
Team	W		L	PCT	W		L	PCT
No. 8 Duke	12	–	4	.750	24	–	9	.727
No. 9 Wake Forest	11	–	5	.688	24	–	7	.774
No. 4 North Carolina †	11	–	5	.688	28	–	7	.800
No. 14 Clemson	9	–	7	.563	23	–	10	.697
No. 22 Maryland	9	–	7	.563	21	–	11	.656
Virginia	7	–	9	.438	18	–	13	.581
Florida State	6	–	10	.375	20	–	12	.625
NC State	4	–	12	.250	17	–	15	.531
Georgia Tech	3	–	13	.188	9	–	18	.333
† 1997 ACC tournament winner Rankings from AP poll

The 1996–97 Virginia Cavaliers men's basketball team represented the University of Virginia during the 1996–97 NCAA Division I men's basketball season. The team was led by seventh-year head coach Jeff Jones, and played their home games at University Hall in Charlottesville, Virginia as members of the Atlantic Coast Conference.

== Last season ==
The Cavaliers had a record of 18–13.

== Roster ==
1996–97 Virginia Cavaliers men's basketball team
Players
Coaches

Pos.	#	Name	Height	Weight	Year	Hometown
G	5	Curtis Staples	6 ft 3 in (1.91 m)	186 lb (84 kg)	Jr	Roanoke, Virginia
G/F	13	Jamal Robinson (C)	6 ft 7 in (2.01 m)	195 lb (88 kg)	Sr	Jamaica, New York
G	15	Peter McLaughlin	6 ft 2 in (1.88 m)	166 lb (75 kg)	Jr	Maplewood, New Jersey
G	21	Harold Deane	6 ft 2 in (1.88 m)	175 lb (79 kg)	Sr	Ettrick, Virginia
G/F	24	Willie Dersch	6 ft 5 in (1.96 m)	197 lb (89 kg)	Fr	Floral Park, New York
F	25	Norman Nolan	6 ft 8 in (2.03 m)	243 lb (110 kg)	Jr	Baltimore, Maryland
G	31	Mike Curtis	6 ft 3 in (1.91 m)	190 lb (86 kg)	Jr	Richmond, Virginia
G/F	32	Courtney Alexander	6 ft 6 in (1.98 m)	191 lb (87 kg)	So	Durham, North Carolina
G/F	33	Monte Marcaccini	6 ft 5 in (1.96 m)	203 lb (92 kg)	RS So	Tarzana, California
C	42	Chase Metheney	7 ft 4 in (2.24 m)	236 lb (107 kg)	RS So	Charlotte, North Carolina
C	44	Kris Hunter	6 ft 10 in (2.08 m)	206 lb (93 kg)	Fr	Tallahassee, Florida
F/C	52	Colin Ducharme	6 ft 9 in (2.06 m)	243 lb (110 kg)	Fr	Richmond, Virginia
F/C	54	Craig McAndrew	6 ft 10 in (2.08 m)	246 lb (112 kg)	Fr	Wonga Beach, Queensland
F	55	Martin Walton	6 ft 9 in (2.06 m)	220 lb (100 kg)	Sr	Portsmouth, Virginia

Head coach

- Jeff Jones (Virginia)

Assistant coach(es)

- Anthony Solomon (Virginia)
- Tom Perrin (Vermont)
- Pete Herrmann (SUNY Geneseo)

Legend

- (C) Team captain
- (S) Suspended
- (I) Ineligible
- (W) Walk-on
- Injured
- Current redshirt

Roster

== Schedule ==
Date time, TV	Rank^{#}	Opponent^{#}	Result	Record	Site (attendance) city, state
Regular season
Nov. 25*		vs. South Carolina; Maui Classic	W 93–70	1–0	Lahaina Civic Center (2,500); Lahaina, HI
Nov. 26*		vs. No. 17 Massachusetts; Maui Classic	W 75–68	2–0	Lahaina Civic Center (2,500); Lahaina, HI
Nov. 27*		vs. No. 2 Kansas; Maui Classic	L 63–80	2–1	Lahaina Civic Center (2,500); Lahaina, HI
Nov. 30*		at George Mason	W 106–93	3–1	Patriot Center (6,707); Fairfax, Virginia
Dec. 4*	No. 25	at William & Mary	W 75–64	4–1	William & Mary Hall (4,617); Williamsburg, Virginia
Dec. 7	No. 25	No. 12 Clemson	L 52–62	4–2 (0–1)	University Hall (8,004); Charlottesville, Virginia
Dec. 18*		Liberty	W 67–54	5–2 (0–1)	University Hall (7,026); Charlottesville, Virginia
Dec. 21*		UMBC	W 57–34	6–2 (0–1)	University Hall (6,507); Charlottesville, Virginia
Dec. 23*		at Connecticut	L 61–64 ^{OT}	6–3 (0–1)	Harry A. Gampel Pavilion (10,027); Storrs, Connecticut
Dec. 28*		Radford	W 95–47	7–3 (0–1)	University Hall (7,907); Charlottesville, Virginia
Dec. 30*		Delaware	W 76–66	8–3 (0–1)	University Hall (7,658); Charlottesville, Virginia
Jan. 2*		Loyola	W 67–61	9–3 (0–1)	University Hall (6,733); Charlottesville, Virginia
Jan. 4		at No. 19 Maryland	L 62–78	9–4 (0–2)	Cole Field House (14,500); College Park, Maryland
Jan. 8		at Florida State	W 64–61	10–4 (1–2)	Tallahassee-Leon County Civic Center (9,452); Tallahassee, Florida
Jan. 11		No. 13 North Carolina	W 75–63	11–4 (2–2)	University Hall (8,241); Charlottesville, Virginia
Jan. 15		at No. 2 Wake Forest	L 54–58	11–5 (2–3)	LJVM Coliseum (14,268); Winston-Salem, North Carolina
Jan. 18		at No. 13 Duke	L 59–78	11–6 (2–4)	Cameron Indoor Stadium (9,314); Durham, North Carolina
Jan. 22		Georgia Tech	W 68–64	12–6 (3–4)	University Hall (8,120); Charlottesville, Virginia
Jan. 28		NC State	W 56–50	13–6 (4–4)	University Hall (7,697); Charlottesville, Virginia
Jan. 30*		Richmond	W 83–66	14–6 (4–4)	University Hall (7,306); Charlottesville, Virginia
Feb. 1		Florida State	W 73–60	15–6 (5–4)	University Hall (8,120); Charlottesville, Virginia
Feb. 6		at Georgia Tech	L 53–66	15–7 (5–5)	Alexander Memorial Coliseum (8,103); Atlanta, Georgia
Feb. 8		at No. 20 North Carolina	L 57–81	15–8 (5–6)	Dean Smith Center (21,572); Chapel Hill, North Carolina
Feb. 11		No. 6 Duke	L 61–62	15–9 (5–7)	University Hall (8,394); Charlottesville, Virginia
Feb. 15		at No. 7 Clemson	L 65–71	15–10 (5–8)	Littlejohn Coliseum (10,500); Clemson, South Carolina
Feb. 19		at NC State	W 55–46	16–10 (6–8)	Reynolds Coliseum (12,400); Raleigh, North Carolina
Feb. 22		No. 4 Wake Forest	L 60–66	16–11 (6–9)	University Hall (8,150); Charlottesville, Virginia
Feb. 25*		vs. Virginia Tech	W 58–57	17–11 (6–9)	Richmond Coliseum (8,503); Richmond, Virginia
Mar. 2		No. 16 Maryland	W 81–74	18–11 (7–9)	University Hall (8,182); Charlottesville, Virginia
ACC Tournament
Mar. 7	(6)	vs. (3) No. 5 North Carolina; ACC Tournament quarterfinals	L 68–78	18–12	Greensboro Coliseum (23,250); Greensboro, North Carolina
NCAA tournament
Mar. 13*	(9 W)	vs. (8 W) Iowa; NCAA Tournament first round	L 60–73	18–13	Jon M. Huntsman Center (13,886); Salt Lake City
*Non-conference game. (#) Tournament seedings in parentheses. All times are in Eastern Time.
