= Greg Newton =

Canadian basketball player

Personal information
- Born: September 7, 1974 (age 52) Niagara Falls, Ontario
- Listed height: 6 ft 10 in (2.08 m)
- Listed weight: 245 lb (111 kg)

Career information
- High school: A. N. Myer (Niagara Falls, Ontario)
- College: Duke (1993–1997)
- NBA draft: 1997: undrafted
- Playing career: 1997–2005
- Position: Power forward / center

Career history
- 1997: Raleigh Cougars
- 1997–1998: Siemens Gent
- 1998–1999: Hapoel Eilat
- 1999–2000: Flamengo
- 2000: Estudiantes de Bahía Blanca
- 2000: KD Hopsi Polzela
- 2001–2002: Scafati Basket
- 2002–2003: Cherno More Varna
- 2003: Lavovi 063
- 2003–2004: Dynamo Moscow Region
- 2004–2005: HKK Široki
- 2005: Pallacanestro Trapani
- 2005: Club Melilla Baloncesto

Gregory Michael Newton (born September 7, 1974) is a Canadian former professional basketball player. He played four years of college basketball at Duke University and served as team captain during his senior year.

== College career ==
He was a center for the Duke Blue Devils men's basketball team from 1994 to 1997, playing for coach Mike Krzyzewski. Newton was team captain in his senior season. He averaged 7.6 points per game for his Duke career. His best NCAA season came in 1995-95 (12.2 points, 8.2 rebounds a game). Newton was suspended from Duke in 1995 for two semesters for cheating on a computer science exam. Newton was a "Did Not Play-Coaches' Decision" benchwarmer in his final college game, Duke's loss to Providence in the 2nd round of the 1997 NCAA Tournament.

== Professional career ==
Newton was eligible for selection in the 1997 NBA Draft but was not chosen by any teams, and no teams expressed any interest in signing him as an undrafted rookie free agent. He began his professional with the USBL's Raleigh Cougars. The Cougars promoted him by citing his greatest accomplishment - at the time, he was one away from Duke's top 10 in blocks.

Newton went on to play professionally in several countries, including Belgium, Israel, Brazil, Argentina, Slovenia, Italy, Bulgaria, Serbia, Russia, Bosnia and Herzegovina and Spain.

In July 2011, Newton joined the coaching staff of the Brock University men's basketball team, serving as an assistant coach until 2013.

== National team ==
He was a member of the Canadian national team. At the 1998 World Championships, he led Canada in scoring (11.5 points per contest) and rebounding (10.1 rebounds per contest).

He finished seventh with Canada in the 2000 Summer Olympics in Sydney, Australia.

== See also ==
- List of foreign basketball players in Serbia
