= 1996–97 Duke Blue Devils men's basketball team =

American college basketball season

1996–97 Duke Blue Devils men's basketball

ACC regular season champions

NCAA tournament, round of 32
- Conference: Atlantic Coast Conference

Ranking
- Coaches: No. 11
- AP: No. 8
- Record: 24–9 (12–4 ACC)
- Head coach: Mike Krzyzewski (17th season)
- Assistant coaches: Tommy Amaker; Quin Snyder; Tim O'Toole
- Home arena: Cameron Indoor Stadium

1996–97 ACC men's basketball standings
	Conf.				Overall
Team	W		L	PCT	W		L	PCT
No. 8 Duke	12	–	4	.750	24	–	9	.727
No. 9 Wake Forest	11	–	5	.688	24	–	7	.774
No. 4 North Carolina †	11	–	5	.688	28	–	7	.800
No. 14 Clemson	9	–	7	.563	23	–	10	.697
No. 22 Maryland	9	–	7	.563	21	–	11	.656
Virginia	7	–	9	.438	18	–	13	.581
Florida State	6	–	10	.375	20	–	12	.625
NC State	4	–	12	.250	17	–	15	.531
Georgia Tech	3	–	13	.188	9	–	18	.333
† 1997 ACC tournament winner Rankings from AP poll

The 1996–97 Duke Blue Devils men's basketball team represented Duke University. The head coach was Mike Krzyzewski. The team played its home games in the Cameron Indoor Stadium in Durham, North Carolina, and was a member of the Atlantic Coast Conference. Duke finished with an overall record 24–9 (12–4 ACC). The team was invited to the 1997 NCAA Tournament as a #2 seed. After a first round win vs Murray State, Duke was upset by #10 seed Providence 98–87.

== Roster ==
1996–97 Duke Blue Devils men's basketball team
Players
Coaches

Pos.	#	Name	Height	Weight	Year	Previous school	Hometown
G	5	Jeff Capel	6 ft 5 in (1.96 m)	195 lb (88 kg)	Sr	Cardinal Ritter	Fayetteville, NC
F	23	Chris Carrawell	6 ft 6 in (1.98 m)	215 lb (98 kg)	Fr	South View	St. Louis, MO
F	41	Matt Christensen	6 ft 10 in (2.08 m)	265 lb (120 kg)	So	Belmont	Belmont, MA
C	40	Taymon Domzalski	6 ft 10 in (2.08 m)	245 lb (111 kg)	So	New Mexico Military Institute	Lovington, NM
G	22	Jay Heaps	5 ft 9 in (1.75 m)	155 lb (70 kg)	So	Longmeadow	Longmeadow, MA
G	21	Trajan Langdon	6 ft 4 in (1.93 m)	195 lb (88 kg)	RS So	East Anchorage	Anchorage, AK
F	4	Roshown McLeod	6 ft 8 in (2.03 m)	220 lb (100 kg)	Sr	St. Anthony's	Jersey City, NJ
F/C	55	Greg Newton	6 ft 10 in (2.08 m)	245 lb (111 kg)	Sr	A.N. Myer	Niagara Falls, Ontario
G/F	3	Ricky Price	6 ft 6 in (1.98 m)	190 lb (86 kg)	Jr	Serra	Gardena, CA
F	15	Todd Singleton	6 ft 4 in (1.93 m)	195 lb (88 kg)	Jr	Old Mill	Severn, MD
F	34	Carmen Wallace	6 ft 6 in (1.98 m)	205 lb (93 kg)	Sr	Tower Hill	Wilmington, DE
G	12	Steve Wojciechowski	5 ft 11 in (1.8 m)	180 lb (82 kg)	Jr	Cardinal Gibbons	Severn, MD

Head coach

- Mike Krzyzewski

Assistant coach(es)

- Tommy Amaker
- Quin Snyder
- Tim O'Toole

Legend

- (C) Team captain
- (S) Suspended
- (I) Ineligible
- (W) Walk-on
- Injured
- Current redshirt

Roster
Last update: 2021-01-23

== Schedule ==
Date time, TV	Rank^{#}	Opponent^{#}	Result	Record	Site city, state
Regular season
November 20, 1996*	No. 10	St. Joseph's; Preseason NIT	W 89–60	1–0	Cameron Indoor Stadium; Durham, NC
November 22, 1996*	No. 10	Vanderbilt; Preseason NIT	W 86–57	2–0	Cameron Indoor Stadium; Durham, NC
November 27, 1996*	No. 6	vs. No. 22 Tulsa; Preseason NIT	W 72–67	3–0	Madison Square Garden; New York, NY
November 29, 1996*	No. 6	vs. No. 20 Indiana; Preseason NIT	L 69–85	3–1	Madison Square Garden; New York, NY
December 2, 1996*	No. 10	Lehigh	W 103–51	4–1	Cameron Indoor Stadium; Durham, NC
December 5, 1996	No. 10	Florida State	W 72–66 ^{OT}	5–1 (1–0)	Cameron Indoor Stadium; Durham, NC
December 8, 1996*	No. 10	No. 7 Michigan	L 61–62	5–2	Cameron Indoor Stadium; Durham, NC
December 11, 1996*	No. 14	Davidson	W 85–58	6–2	Cameron Indoor Stadium; Durham, NC
December 14, 1996*	No. 14	at No. 4 Villanova	W 87–79	7–2	CoreStates Center; Philadelphia, PA
December 22, 1996*	No. 11	Army	W 100–38	8–2	Cameron Indoor Stadium; Durham, NC
December 30, 1996*	No. 13	Western Carolina	W 104–54	9–2	Cameron Indoor Stadium; Durham, NC
January 2, 1997*	No. 13	South Carolina State	W 104–54	10–2	Cameron Indoor Stadium; Durham, NC
January 5, 1997	No. 13	at Georgia Tech	W 66–56	11–2 (2–0)	Alexander Memorial Coliseum; Atlanta, GA
January 7, 1997	No. 10	at No. 5 Clemson	L 82–86 ^{OT}	11–3 (2–1)	Littlejohn Coliseum; Clemson, SC
January 11, 1997	No. 10	No. 2 Wake Forest	L 69–81	11–4 (2–2)	Cameron Indoor Stadium; Durham, NC
January 13, 1997*	No. 13	Campbell	W 84–59	12–4	Cameron Indoor Stadium; Durham, NC
January 15, 1997*	No. 13	at UNC Greensboro	W 87–49	13–4	Greensboro Coliseum; Greensboro, NC
January 18, 1997	No. 13	Virginia	W 78–59	14–4 (3–2)	Cameron Indoor Stadium; Durham, NC
January 21, 1997	No. 10	at NC State	W 70–55	15–4 (4–2)	Reynolds Coliseum; Raleigh, NC
January 26, 1997	No. 10	at No. 7 Maryland	L 70–74	15–5 (4–3)	Cole Field House; College Park, MD
January 29, 1997	No. 12	No. 19 North Carolina	W 80–73	16–5 (5–3)	Cameron Indoor Stadium; Durham, NC
February 2, 1997	No. 12	Georgia Tech	W 70–61	17–5 (6–3)	Cameron Indoor Stadium; Durham, NC
February 5, 1997	No. 8	at No. 2 Wake Forest	W 73–68	18–5 (7–3)	LJVM Coliseum; Winston-Salem, NC
February 8, 1997	No. 8	NC State	W 80–51	19–5 (8–3)	Cameron Indoor Stadium; Durham, NC
February 11, 1997	No. 6	at Virginia	W 62–61	20–5 (9–3)	University Hall; Charlottesville, VA
February 15, 1997	No. 6	at Florida State	W 89–79	21–5 (10–3)	Donald L. Tucker Center; Tallahassee, FL
February 18, 1997	No. 6	No. 8 Clemson	W 84–77	22–5 (11–3)	Cameron Indoor Stadium; Durham, NC
February 23, 1997*	No. 6	at No. 17 UCLA	L 69–73	22–6	Pauley Pavilion; Los Angeles, CA
February 27, 1997	No. 7	No. 16 Maryland	W 81–69	23–6 (12–3)	Cameron Indoor Stadium; Durham, NC
March 2, 1997	No. 7	at No. 8 North Carolina	L 85–91	23–7 (12–4)	Dean Smith Center; Chapel Hill, NC
ACC Tournament
March 7, 1997	(1) No. 7	vs. (8) NC State; ACC tournament	L 60–66	23–8	Greensboro Coliseum; Greensboro, NC
NCAA tournament
March 14, 1997*; CBS	(2) No. 8	vs. (15) Murray State; NCAA SE First Round	W 71–68	24–8	Charlotte Coliseum; Charlotte, NC
March 16, 1997*; CBS	(2) No. 8	vs. (10) Providence; NCAA SE Second Round	L 87–98	24–9	Charlotte Coliseum; Charlotte, NC
*Non-conference game. ^{#}Rankings from AP Poll. (#) Tournament seedings in parentheses. SE=Southeast region. Source: Duke media guide

== Awards and honors ==
- Mike Krzyzewski, ACC Coach of the Year
- Mike Krzyzewski, Basketball Times National Coach of the Year

== Team players drafted into the NBA ==
No one from the men's basketball team was selected in the 1997 NBA draft.
