= BeeJay Anya =

American basketball player

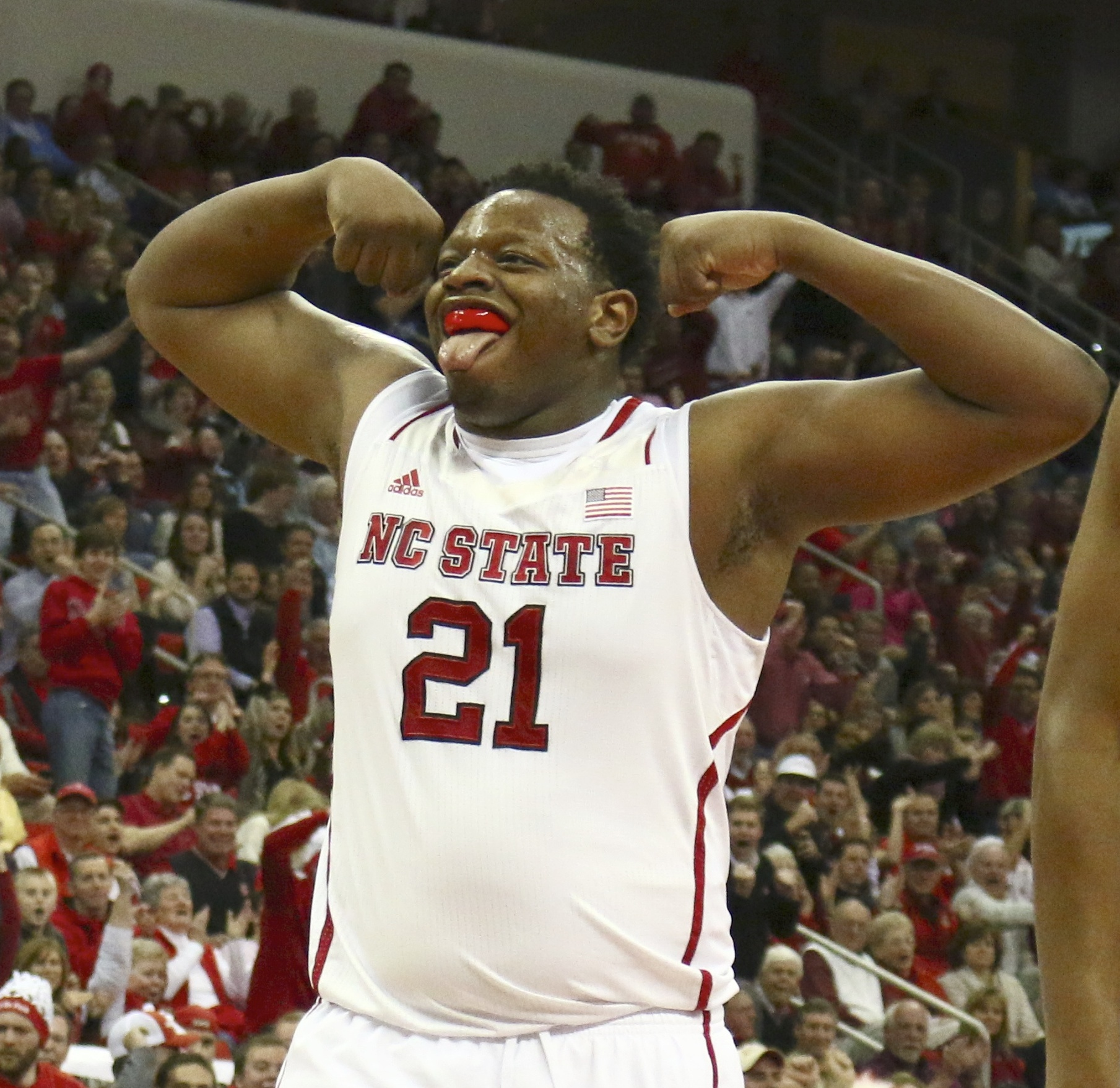
- Anya reacts after scoring big for NC State in 2014

Personal information
- Born: March 9, 1995 (age 31) Cheverly, Maryland, U.S.
- Listed height: 6 ft 9 in (2.06 m)
- Listed weight: 325 lb (147 kg)

Career information
- High school: DeMatha (Hyattsville, Maryland)
- College: NC State (2013–2017)
- NBA draft: 2017: undrafted
- Position: Power forward / center

Career history
- 2020: TLN Kalev
- 2021: Torta del Casar Extremadura

Career highlights
- ACC Sixth Man of the Year (2015); ACC All-Defensive Team (2015)
Medals
Men's basketball
Representing the United States
FIBA U17 World Championship
Gold medal – first place	2012 Lithuania	National team

Chukwunonso Nduka "BeeJay" Anya (born March 9, 1995) is an American former basketball player. He played college basketball for the NC State Wolfpack. He was named Atlantic Coast Conference Sixth Man of the Year in 2015. Anya represented the United States youth team at the 2012 FIBA Under-17 World Championship, winning the gold medal.

== College career ==
Anya played college basketball for NC State where he was best known for his shot blocking ability. During his sophomore season in a game against Jacksonville, he set the NC State school record for blocks in a single game with 10. In setting the record, Anya at one point recorded 4 blocks in a single possession. His 91 blocks during the 2014–2015 season put him second on the NC State single season blocks list, behind Thurl Bailey's 95 blocks in 1983. Anya entered the 2015–2016 season in 5th place on NC State's career blocks list with 137 career blocks. He finished his career with the Wolfpack in 2017 with 243 career blocked shots, a school record.

Anya also holds the record for longest wingspan recorded for a non-7-foot player in the NBA Draft Express database for basketball prospects, with a wingspan of 7 ft 9 in.

== Professional career ==
In January 2020, Anya signed with TLN Kalev of the Latvian-Estonian Basketball League where he appeared in two games. In January 2021, Anya signed with Torta del Casar Extremadura of the Spanish Liga EBA where he appeared in one game.

== Personal ==
Anya is of Nigerian descent, his father Ben Anya having played soccer while growing up. His sister Stephanie competed as a basketball center for American University.
