= Justin Gainey =

American basketball coach (born 1977)

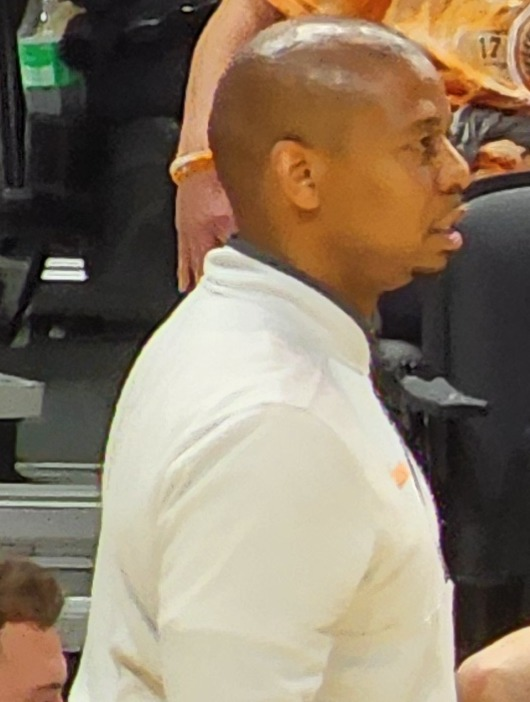
- Gainey in 2024

Current position
- Title: Head coach
- Team: NC State
- Conference: ACC

Biographical details
- Born: March 19, 1977 (age 49); High Point, North Carolina, U.S.

Playing career
- 1996–2000: NC State
- 2000–2001: Wörthersee Piraten
- 2001–2002: Olympique Antibes
- 2002–2003: Pennsylvania ValleyDawgs
- Position: point guard

Coaching career (HC unless noted)
- 2009–2010: Elon (assistant)
- 2010–2014: Appalachian State (assistant)
- 2017–2018: Santa Clara (assistant)
- 2018–2020: Arizona (assistant)
- 2020–2021: Marquette (AHC)
- 2021–2022: Tennessee (assistant)
- 2022–2026: Tennessee (AHC)
- 2026–present: NC State

Administrative career (AD unless noted)
- 2006–2008: NC State (administrative coordinator)
- 2008–2009: NC State (director of operations)
- 2014–2017: Marquette (director of operations)

Justin Dewaine Gainey (born March 19, 1977) is an American college basketball coach who is the head men's basketball coach at NC State, his alma mater. He previously served as the associate head coach at Tennessee. Gainey held coaching and administrative roles at Marquette, Arizona, Santa Clara, Appalachian State, Elon, and his alma mater.

== Playing career ==
Following a successful high school career at Greensboro Day School, Gainey played 4 years at NC State. Gainey helped the Wolfpack to postseason appearances in all 4 of his seasons and served as captain in his senior year. Gainey ranked 2nd in starts (103) 4th in steals (190), and 9th in assists (344) at the conclusion of his playing career.

During his freshman season at NC State, Gainey set the record for most minutes played in the ACC tournament after playing every minute of NC State's four games in as many days. He was named to the first tournament team at the conclusion of the tournament.

In his senior year, the NC State Wolfpack placed fourth at the 2000 National Invitation Tournament. With eight seconds left in the semifinal game, Gainey was fouled, but missed a free-throw after Wake Forest called a time out, allowing Wake Forest to pull ahead. Gainey scored ten points in the game. NC State would eventually lose the third place game by one basket to Penn State.

== Coaching career ==
After graduating with a degree in Business Administration from NC State, Gainey returned to his alma mater and served as an administrative coordinator on Sidney Lowe's staff from 2006 to 2008. Gainey was then promoted to director of operations, holding the position for 1 year. He spent the following season at Elon University as an assistant coach before joining Jason Capel's staff at Appalachian State in the same role. Gainey and Capel had a strong relationship dating back to playing a year of high school basketball together. After serving as an assistant coach for 4 years at Appalachian State, Gainey accepted the director of operations job on Steve Wojciechowski's staff at Marquette. In his final 2 seasons as director of operations, the Golden Eagles won at least 19 games in both seasons and made an NCAA Tournament appearance in his final season (2016-17).

Next, Gainey joined his former college head coach, Herb Sendek, as an assistant coach at Santa Clara. In his one year at Santa Clara, Gainey was instrumental in the Broncos signing a recruiting class in 2018 that was ranked in the top 10 for mid-majors. Gainey then joined Sean Miller's staff as an assistant coach at Arizona for 2 seasons. At Arizona, Gainey assisted in the recruitment of 3 NBA draft picks - Josh Green, Zeke Nnaji, and Nico Mannion. The Wildcats led the Pac-12 in scoring and finished with 21 wins in Gainey's final year at Arizona. Following his time in Arizona, Gainey rejoined Steve Wojciechowski's staff at Marquette for the 2020-21 season.

Prior to the 2021-22 season, Gainey joined Rick Barnes' staff at Tennessee as an assistant coach. In his first season in Knoxville, Gainey helped the Volunteers to a 27-win season that featured wins over 4 top-10 ranked teams, a season high AP poll rank of #5, and the Division 1's 3rd best defensive efficiency (KenPom). They maintained a Top 25 ranking in the AP poll for the entire season. Gainey also assisted in the development of All-SEC and SEC Tournament MVP, Kennedy Chandler. The Volunteers finished with a 14-4 record in SEC conference play and earned a #3 seed in the NCAA Tournament. Tennessee won their opening game in the 2022 NCAA Tournament but fell to Michigan in the Round of 32.

Gainey was appointed to associate head coach and defensive coordinator prior to the 2022-23 season. In his first year leading the defense, the Volunteers posted the best defensive efficiency in the nation. At a point late in the 2022-23 season, the Volunteers had the top defense since KenPom started analyzing numbers in 1997. The team allowed just 57.9 points per game which is the lowest total allowed by an SEC team since 2014-15. The Vols won 25 games in 2022-23 and earned a #4 seed in the 2023 NCAA Tournament. In the opening round of the 2023 NCAA Tournament, Tennessee defeated #13 seed, Louisiana. In the Round of 32, the Volunteers beat Duke and held them to a season and NCAA Tournament game low (tied), 52 points, with Gainey responsible for the team's scout. Tennessee ultimately fell to Final Four participant, Florida Atlantic, in the Sweet Sixteen.

The 2023-24 Tennessee team built upon the success of the 2022-23 season and are currently on pace for another NCAA Tournament bid. With Gainey again leading the defense, the team sits in the Top 5 in defensive efficiency again on KenPom (as of 3/7/24). The Volunteers also earned their first solo SEC regular season title since 2007-08. The 2024-25 Tennessee basketball season was Gainey's ninthteenth season as a coach.

=== NC State ===
On March 31, 2026, NC State hired Gainey as head coach, replacing Will Wade who went back to LSU.

== Head coaching record ==
Record table
Season	Team	Overall	Conference	Standing	Postseason
NC State Wolfpack (Atlantic Coast Conference) (2026–present)
2026–27	NC State	5–1	0–0		
NC State:		5–1 (.833)	0–0 (–)		
Total:		5–1 (.833)			
National champion Postseason invitational champion Conference regular season champion Conference regular season and conference tournament champion Division regular season champion Division regular season and conference tournament champion Conference tournament champion
