= Shammond Williams =

Basketball Player (born 1975)

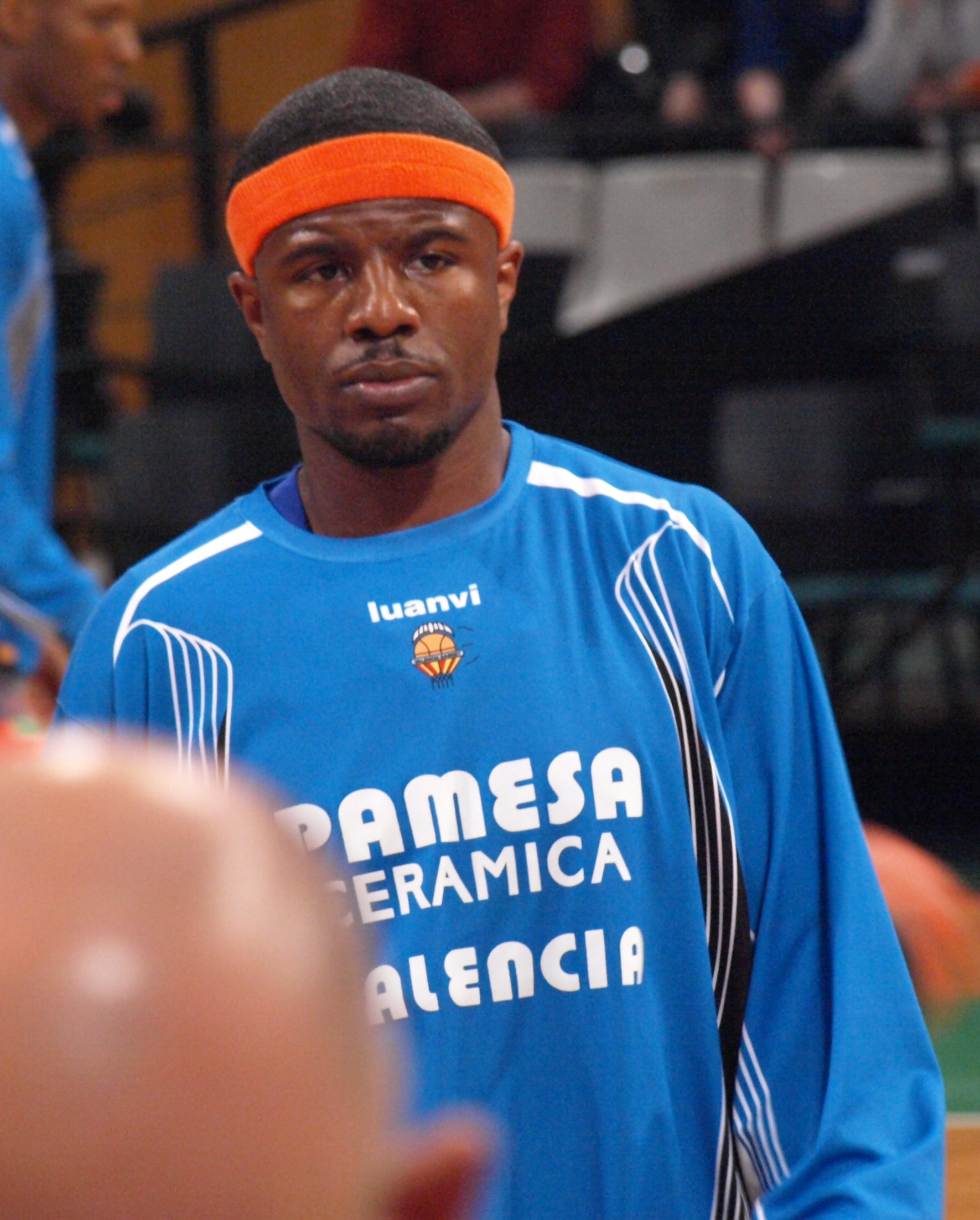

Monmouth Red Hawks
- Title: Assistant coach
- League: Coastal Athletic Association

Personal information
- Born: April 5, 1975 (age 51) The Bronx, New York, U.S.
- Listed height: 6 ft 1 in (1.85 m)
- Listed weight: 205 lb (93 kg)

Career information
- High school: Fork Union Military Academy (Fork Union, Virginia)
- College: North Carolina (1994–1998)
- NBA draft: 1998: 2nd round, 34th overall pick
- Drafted by: Chicago Bulls
- Playing career: 1998–2011
- Position: Point guard / shooting guard
- Number: 3, 1, 11
- Coaching career: 2012–present

Career history

Playing
- 1998–1999: Atlanta Hawks
- 1999: Ülkerspor
- 1999–2002: Seattle SuperSonics
- 2002–2003: Boston Celtics
- 2003: Denver Nuggets
- 2003–2004: Orlando Magic
- 2004: New Orleans Hornets
- 2004–2005: UNICS Kazan
- 2005–2006: FC Barcelona
- 2006–2007: Los Angeles Lakers
- 2007–2009: Pamesa Valencia
- 2009–2010: Unicaja Málaga
- 2010: CB Murcia
- 2011: Apollon Limassol
- 2011: Fabi Shoes Montegranaro

Career highlights
- FIBA EuroCup All-Star Day MVP (2005); Second-team All-ACC (1998); Third-team All-ACC (1997); ACC tournament MVP (1997)

Career NBA statistics
- Points: 1,892 (5.8 ppg)
- Rebounds: 518 (1.6 rpg)
- Assists: 765 (2.4 apg)
- Stats at NBA.com
- Stats at Basketball Reference

Shammond Omar Williams (born April 5, 1975) is an American-born naturalized Georgian former professional basketball player. Standing at 1.85 m (6 ft 1 in), he played at both point guard and shooting guard positions. During his career he played in the NBA and in Europe. He most recently served as the interim head coach for the Denver Pioneers men's basketball team after head coach Jeff Wellbrun was placed on leave for the remainder of the 2024-25 season. He was not retained on Tim Bergstraser's staff.

== Collegiate career ==
After attending Fork Union Military Academy, Williams played college basketball at North Carolina under Dean Smith and later, Bill Guthridge. During the 1997–1998 season, he was a member of coach Guthridge's "Six Starters" rotation with Antawn Jamison, Vince Carter, Ed Cota, Ademola Okulaja and Makhtar N'Diaye. That season (his final college season), he averaged 16.7 points and 4.2 assists per game to go along with career averages of 10.7 points and 3.0 assists per game.

When Williams graduated from North Carolina, he held the following school records:

- Most Career Three Point Field Goals Made: 233
- Most Season Three Point Field Goals Made: 95
- Most Three Point Field Goals Made in a Game: 8 (tie)
- Highest Career Free Throw Percentage: .849
- Highest Season Free Throw Percentage .911

Williams also became a pioneer of the internet during his collegiate career. In 1995, Shammond Williams became the very first collegiate athlete to have a website dedicated to him on the World Wide Web. The website was developed by Seth Fleishman, and an archive of [ "Shammond's World"] is still available for viewing.

== Professional career ==
Williams was selected in the second round, 34th overall, of the 1998 NBA draft by the Chicago Bulls. While he never played for the Bulls, he did play for the Atlanta Hawks, Seattle SuperSonics, Boston Celtics, Denver Nuggets, New Orleans Hornets, and Orlando Magic.

He played internationally for Unics Kazan of Russia (where he obtained Georgian citizenship) and for Winterthur FC Barcelona of the Spanish Asociación de Clubs de Baloncesto (ACB). He has played for the Georgia national team and was the Most Valuable Player of the 2005 EuroChallenge All-Star Game.

Williams signed a one-year contract with the Los Angeles Lakers on July 12, 2006. After spending one season with the Lakers, Williams returned to Europe and signed with Pamesa Velencia for three seasons. Before the start of the 2009–2010 ACB regular season, Pamesa Valencia released Williams, whereupon he trained on his own in the United States. On November 9, 2009, Williams returned to Spain and signed with Unicaja Málaga.

In January 2011 he signed with Apollon Limassol BC in Cyprus. After finishing the season in Cyprus he signed with Sutor Basket Montegranaro in Italy.

== Coaching career ==
During the 2011–12 season, he attended practices of North Carolina's men's basketball team and in 2012 was among the candidates to join Roy Williams' staff at UNC. He was also a counselor at the Nike Elite Youth Skill Academies. On June 21, 2012, Williams was appointed an assistant coach of the Furman Paladins. In 2013, he moved to the Tulane Green Wave, where he served a three-year stint as assistant coach, followed by one year at Western Kentucky Hilltoppers. On September 15, 2021, Williams resumed his coaching career by accepting an offer to join the Old Dominion Monarchs women's basketball team as an assistant coach. On July 2, 2024, Williams was hired as an assistant coach for the Denver Pioneers. On February 21, 2025, coach Jeff Wulbrun announced he was going to be on leave for the remainder of the 2024-2025 basketball season. That same day Denver reported that Shammond would be the interim coach for the Pioneers.

== Personal life ==
He is a cousin of former basketball player Kevin Garnett of the Minnesota Timberwolves and Louis McCullough, who has played professional basketball overseas. He is a member of the Psi Delta chapter of Omega Psi Phi. He is godfather to Mitchell Robinson.
