= Jeremy Hyatt =

American basketball player

Career information
- Playing career: 1997–2008

Career history
- 2001–2008: Newcastle Eagles

Jeremy Hyatt (born October 16, 1974) is retired American professional basketball player, who formerly played for the Newcastle Eagles in the British Basketball League. He was a key player in the success of the Eagles, most notably the "clean sweep" of Championships in 2006.

== Biography ==
The 6′ 6′′ shooting guard attended North Carolina State University, and signed for the Eagles in 2001. He was noted and greatly respected for his perimeter shooting and his ability to defend out of position against forwards. Hyatt has also played in France, Lebanon, and Central America. He has also played in the USBL for the Raleigh Cougars (1997–1999), Washington Congressionals (2000), and Pennsylvania ValleyDawgs.
