= Clyde Austin =

American basketball player (1957–2025)

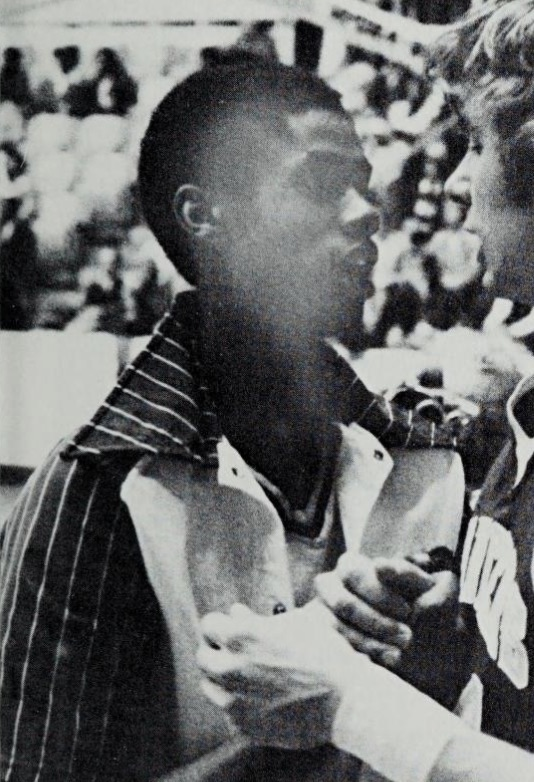
- Austin in 1976

Personal information
- Born: December 1, 1957 Raleigh, North Carolina, U.S.
- Died: August 16, 2025 (aged 67) Las Vegas, Nevada, U.S.
- Listed height: 6 ft 2 in (1.88 m)
- Listed weight: 150 lb (68 kg)

Career information
- High school: Maggie L. Walker (Richmond, Virginia)
- College: NC State (1976–1980)
- NBA draft: 1980: 2nd round, 44th overall pick
- Drafted by: Philadelphia 76ers
- Playing career: 1980–1988
- Position: Point guard
- Number: 15
- Coaching career: 1996–1996

Career history

Playing
- 1980: Philadelphia Kings
- 1980–1988: Harlem Globetrotters

Coaching
- 1996: Carolina Cardinals

Career highlights
- AP Honorable Mention All-American (1978); Second-team All-ACC (1978); Second-team Parade All-American (1976)
- Stats at Basketball Reference

Clyde Edward Austin (November 1, 1957 – August 16, 2025) was an American basketball player. He played college basketball for the NC State Wolfpack and was a second round pick by the Philadelphia 76ers in the 1980 NBA draft. Austin spent eight years with the Harlem Globetrotters. After his retirement from playing, he was involved in the United States Basketball League (USBL) as the head coach of the Carolina Cardinals and founded the Raleigh Cougars. Austin worked as a pastor until he was imprisoned for his involvement in running a pyramid scheme that swindled money from investors including his seminar attendees.

== Early life ==
Austin was raised in Jackson Ward in Richmond, Virginia, in a family of 13 children. He frequently witnessed his mother receive beatings from his stepfather. When Austin was 15, his stepfather shot his mother in the head and left her unable to walk or talk.

As a teenager, Austin sold pills on the streets of Richmond until his high school coach found out and encouraged him to stop.

Nicknamed "Clyde the Glide", Austin emerged as a basketball prospect while playing for Maggie L. Walker High School in Richmond. He is considered one of the area's greatest high school basketball players.

== Playing career ==
Austin played college basketball for the NC State Wolfpack and was an honorable mention All-American during his sophomore season. He was selected by the Philadelphia 76ers as the 44th overall pick in the 1980 NBA draft but never played in the National Basketball Association (NBA).

Austin played for the Philadelphia Kings of the Continental Basketball Association for 13 games in 1980. He then joined the Harlem Globetrotters for eight years.

== Post-playing career ==
After his retirement from playing, Austin became an ordained minister and served as a pastor for a church in Cary, North Carolina, and Heavens Light Christian Center in Las Vegas, Nevada.

Austin was the head coach for the Carolina Cardinals of the United States Basketball League (USBL) in 1996 and accumulated a 6–12 record. Austin also had an ownership interest in the team. The Cardinals became the first USBL team to cease operations during a season when they folded before the conclusion of the 1996 season.

On February 7, 1997, the USBL announced that a team owned by Austin, the Raleigh Cougars, would join the league. Austin attempted to sell the Cougars during the 1999 offseason but was unsuccessful and ceased active involvement with the team. On June 7, 1999, the Cougars folded after unpaid players refused to make a road trip; they were the second USBL team to fold mid-season after the Cardinals. The Cougars had collected a 31–38 record across three seasons.

=== Legal troubles ===
In 1998, Austin's company, Bankers International Trust, was sued by the North Carolina Attorney General for running a pyramid scheme. Austin moved to Nevada and filed for bankruptcy.

In 2004, Austin was sentenced to 17 years in prison for running a national pyramid scheme in which he stole $16 million from his investors between 1996 and 2000. He swindled the money while serving as a pastor and convinced his victims, including seminar attendees, to invest their money in bonds, overseas trading, real estate and the marketing of products including herbs and weight-loss aids.

Austin received an early release from prison sometime before 2010; that year, he was transferred from Virginia to Nevada by officials while on probation. He worked for the University of Nevada-Las Vegas as a security guard.

On July 22, 2022, Austin plead guilty to one count of wire fraud for his involvement in a scheme to fraudulently obtain unemployment benefits.

== Personal life and death ==
Two of Austin's sons played college basketball: Clyde "Eddie" Austin Jr. played at Doane University and Clyde "Trey" Austin played at Wentworth Military Academy and College.

Austin died in Las Vegas, Nevada, on August 16, 2025, at the age of 67. His death was caused by a blood clot that was left behind from a recent knee surgery which traveled to his lungs and triggered a heart attack.

== Career statistics ==
Legend
GP	Games played	GS	Games started	MPG	Minutes per game
FG%	Field goal percentage	3P%	3-point field goal percentage	FT%	Free throw percentage
RPG	Rebounds per game	APG	Assists per game	SPG	Steals per game
BPG	Blocks per game	PPG	Points per game	**Bold**	Career high

=== College ===
Year	Team	GP	GS	MPG	FG%	3P%	FT%	RPG	APG	SPG	BPG	PPG
1976–77	NC State	28	–	–	.485	–	**.738**	2.5	**5.0**	**1.9**	**.5**	12.2
1977–78	NC State	29	–	–	.457	–	.664	**3.5**	4.2	1.4	.4	12.4
1978–79	NC State	**30**	–	–	.488	–	.699	3.2	4.0	1.2	.3	**14.4**
1979–80	NC State	28	–	–	**.511**	–	.700	2.6	3.3	1.0	.1	8.9
Career		115	–	–	.483	–	.696	3.0	4.1	1.4	.3	12.0
