= 1998 NCAA Division I men's basketball championship game =

American college basketball final

1998 NCAA Tournament Championship Game
National championship game
Utah Utes	Kentucky Wildcats
WAC	SEC
(30–3)	(34–4)
69	78
Head coach: Rick Majerus	Head coach: Tubby Smith
- AP: 7
- Coaches: 7
- AP: 5
- Coaches: 6
	1st half	2nd half	Total
Utah Utes	41	28	69
Kentucky Wildcats	31	47	78
- Date: March 30, 1998
- Venue: Alamodome, San Antonio, Texas
- MVP: Jeff Sheppard, Kentucky
- Favorite: Kentucky by 3.5
- Referees: Jim Burr, Donnie Gray, Mike Sanzere
- Attendance: 40,509

United States TV coverage
- Network: CBS
- Announcers: Jim Nantz (play-by-play); Billy Packer (color); Michele Tafoya and Armen Keteyian (sideline)

The 1998 NCAA Division I men's basketball championship game was the finals of the 1998 NCAA Division I men's basketball tournament and it determined the national champion for the 1997–98 NCAA Division I men's basketball season The game was played on March 30, 1998, at the Alamodome in San Antonio, Texas, and featured the South Regional Champion, No. 2-seeded Kentucky versus the West Regional Champion, No. 3-seeded Utah.

== Participants ==
=== Utah Utes ===
- West Regional
  - (3) Utah 85, (14) San Francisco 68
  - (3) Utah 75, (6) Arkansas 69
  - (3) Utah 65, (10) West Virginia 62
  - (3) Utah 76, (1) Arizona 51
- Final Four
  - (W3) Utah 65, (E1) North Carolina 59

=== Kentucky Wildcats ===
Seeding in brackets

- South
  - (2) Kentucky 82, (15) South Carolina State 67
  - (2) Kentucky 88, (10) Saint Louis 61
  - (2) Kentucky 94, (6) UCLA 66
  - (2) Kentucky 86, (1) Duke 84
- Final Four
  - (S2) Kentucky 86, (MW3) Stanford 85 (OT)

== Starting lineups ==
Utah	Position	Kentucky
Andre Miller	G	Wayne Turner
Drew Hansen	G	Jeff Sheppard
Hanno Möttölä	F	Allen Edwards
Alex Jensen	F	Scott Padgett
Michael Doleac	C	Nazr Mohammed

== Game summary ==
CBS

Monday, March 30

Box score

#S2 Kentucky Wildcats 78, #W3 Utah Utes 69
Scoring by half: 31–41, 47–28
Pts: Scott Padgett 17; Rebs: Heshimu Evans 6 Asts: Allen Edwards 5	Pts: Andre Miller 16; Rebs: Michael Doleac 10; Asts: Andre Miller 5

Alamodome, San Antonio, Texas
Attendance: 40,509
Referees: Jim Burr, Donnie Gray, Mike Sanzere
