= 1998 NCAA Division I men's basketball tournament =

Edition of USA college basketball tournament

- Season: 1997–98
- Teams: 64
- Finals site: Alamodome, San Antonio, Texas
- Champions: Kentucky Wildcats (7th title, 10th title game, 13th Final Four)
- Runner-up: Utah Utes (2nd title game, 4th Final Four)
- Semifinalists: North Carolina Tar Heels (14th Final Four); Stanford Cardinal (2nd Final Four)
- Winning coach: Tubby Smith (1st title)
- MOP: Jeff Sheppard (Kentucky)
- Attendance: 663,876
- Top scorer: Michael Doleac (Utah) (115 points)

The 1998 NCAA Division I men's basketball tournament involved 64 schools playing in single-elimination play to determine the national champion of men's NCAA Division I college basketball. The 60th annual edition of the tournament began on March 12, 1998, and ended with the championship game on March 30, at the Alamodome in San Antonio. A total of 63 games were played.

The Final Four consisted of Kentucky, making their third consecutive Final Four, Stanford, making their first appearance since their initial Final Four run in 1942, Utah, making their fourth Final Four and first since 1966, and North Carolina, who returned for a fourteenth overall time and third in four seasons.

Kentucky won the national title, its second in three seasons and seventh overall, by defeating Utah 78–69 in the championship game.

Jeff Sheppard of Kentucky was named the tournament's Most Outstanding Player. Kentucky came back from double-digit deficits in each of its last three games in the tournament, including a 17-point second half comeback against the Duke Blue Devils, leading to the school's fans dubbing the team the "Comeback Cats". This was Kentucky's third straight championship game appearance.

Bryce Drew led the 13th-seeded Valparaiso Crusaders to the Sweet Sixteen, including a memorable play that remains part of March Madness lore.

For the second consecutive season, a #14 seed advanced from the first round; Richmond, coached by John Beilein, upset South Carolina.

For the second time in three years, a top seeded team failed to advance to the Sweet Sixteen. That distinction belonged to Midwest Region #1 seed Kansas, who was defeated by #8 seed Rhode Island.

== Schedule and venues ==
1998 first and second rounds
1998 Regionals (blue) and Final Four (red)

The following are the sites that were selected to host each round of the 1998 tournament:

First and Second Rounds

- March 12 and 14
  - East Region
    - Hartford Civic Center, Hartford, Connecticut (Host: University of Connecticut)
    - MCI Center, Washington, D.C. (Host: George Mason University)
  - West Region
    - BSU Pavilion, Boise, Idaho (Host: Boise State University)
    - ARCO Arena, Sacramento, California (Host: University of the Pacific)
- March 13 and 15
  - Midwest Region
    - United Center, Chicago, Illinois (Host: Big Ten Conference)
    - Myriad Convention Center, Oklahoma City, Oklahoma (Host: University of Oklahoma)
  - South Region
    - Georgia Dome, Atlanta, Georgia (Host: Georgia Institute of Technology)
    - Rupp Arena, Lexington, Kentucky (Host: University of Kentucky)

Regional semifinals and finals (Sweet Sixteen and Elite Eight)

- March 19 and 21
  - East Regional, Greensboro Coliseum, Greensboro, North Carolina (Host: Atlantic Coast Conference)
  - West Regional, Arrowhead Pond of Anaheim, Anaheim, California (Host: Big West Conference)
- March 20 and 22
  - Midwest Regional, Kiel Center, St. Louis, Missouri (Host: Missouri Valley Conference)
  - South Regional, Tropicana Field, St. Petersburg, Florida (Host: University of South Florida)

National semifinals and championship (Final Four and championship)

- March 28 and 30
  - Alamodome, San Antonio, Texas (Host: University of Texas at San Antonio)

== Teams ==
There were 30 automatic bids awarded to the tournament - of these, 28 were given to the winners of their conference's tournament, while two were awarded to the team with the best regular-season record in their conference (Ivy League and Pac-10).

Three conference champions made their first NCAA tournament appearances: Northern Arizona (Big Sky), Radford (Big South), and Prairie View A&M (SWAC). Additionally, UIC received an at-large bid for its first appearance in the NCAA tournament.

=== Automatic qualifiers ===
Automatic qualifiers
Conference	Team	Appearance	Last bid
ACC	North Carolina	32nd	1997
America East	Delaware	3rd	1993
Atlantic 10	Xavier	12th	1997
Big 12	Kansas	27th	1997
Big East	Connecticut	19th	1995
Big Sky	Northern Arizona	1st	Never
Big South	Radford	1st	Never
Big Ten	Michigan (vacated)	–	1995
Big West	Utah State	12th	1988
CAA	Richmond	6th	1991
Conference USA	Cincinnati	17th	1997
Ivy League	Princeton	21st	1997
MAAC	Iona	4th	1985
MAC	Eastern Michigan	4th	1996
MCC	Butler	3rd	1997
MEAC	South Carolina State	3rd	1996
Mid-Continent	Valparaiso	3rd	1997
Missouri Valley	Illinois State	6th	1997
NEC	Fairleigh Dickinson	3rd	1988
Ohio Valley	Murray State	9th	1997
Pac-10	Arizona	17th	1997
Patriot	Navy	11th	1997
SEC	Kentucky	39th	1997
Southern	Davidson	6th	1986
Southland	Nicholls State	2nd	1995
SWAC	Prairie View A&M	1st	Never
Sun Belt	South Alabama	6th	1997
TAAC	College of Charleston	3rd	1997
WAC	UNLV	13th	1991
West Coast	San Francisco	16th	1982

=== Tournament seeds ===
East Regional – Greensboro Coliseum, Greensboro, North Carolina
Seed	School	Conference	Record	Berth type
1	North Carolina	ACC	30–3	Automatic
2	Connecticut	Big East	29–4	Automatic
3	South Carolina	SEC	22–6	At-Large
4	Michigan State	Big Ten	20–7	At-Large
5	Princeton	Ivy League	26–1	Automatic
6	Xavier	Atlantic 10	22–7	Automatic
7	Indiana	Big Ten	19–11	At-Large
8	UNC Charlotte	Conference USA	19–10	At-Large
9	UIC	MCC	22–5	At-Large
10	Oklahoma	Big 12	22–10	At-Large
11	Washington	Pac-10	18–9	At-Large
12	UNLV	WAC	20–12	Automatic
13	Eastern Michigan	MAC	20–9	Automatic
14	Richmond	CAA	22–7	Automatic
15	Fairleigh Dickinson	NEC	23–6	Automatic
16	Navy	Patriot	19–10	Automatic

West Regional – Arrowhead Pond of Anaheim, Anaheim, California
Seed	School	Conference	Record	Berth type
1	Arizona	Pac-10	27–4	Automatic
2	Cincinnati	Conference USA	26–5	Automatic
3	Utah	WAC	25–3	At-Large
4	Maryland	ACC	19–10	At-Large
5	Illinois	Big Ten	22–9	At-Large
6	Arkansas	SEC	23–8	At-Large
7	Temple	Atlantic 10	21–8	At-Large
8	Tennessee	SEC	20–8	At-Large
9	Illinois State	Missouri Valley	24–5	Automatic
10	West Virginia	Big East	22–8	At-Large
11	Nebraska	Big 12	20–11	At-Large
12	South Alabama	Sun Belt	21–6	Automatic
13	Utah State	Big West	25–7	Automatic
14	San Francisco	West Coast	19–10	Automatic
15	Northern Arizona	Big Sky	21–7	Automatic
16	Nicholls State	Southland	19–9	Automatic

South Regional – Tropicana Field, St. Petersburg, Florida
Seed	School	Conference	Record	Berth type
1	Duke	ACC	29–3	At-Large
2	Kentucky	SEC	29–4	Automatic
3	Michigan (vacated)	Big Ten	24–8	Automatic
4	New Mexico	WAC	23–7	At-Large
5	Syracuse	Big East	24–8	At-Large
6	UCLA	Pac-10	22–8	At-Large
7	UMass	Atlantic 10	21–10	At-Large
8	Oklahoma State	Big 12	21–7	At-Large
9	George Washington	Atlantic 10	24–8	At-Large
10	Saint Louis	Conference USA	21–10	At-Large
11	Miami (FL)	Big East	18–9	At-Large
12	Iona	MAAC	27–5	Automatic
13	Butler	MCC	22–10	Automatic
14	Davidson	Southern	20–9	Automatic
15	South Carolina State	MEAC	22–7	Automatic
16	Radford	Big South	20–9	Automatic

Midwest Regional – Kiel Center, St. Louis, Missouri
Seed	School	Conference	Record	Berth type
1	Kansas	Big 12	34–3	Automatic
2	Purdue	Big Ten	26–7	At-Large
3	Stanford	Pac-10	26–4	At-Large
4	Ole Miss	SEC	22–6	At-Large
5	TCU	WAC	27–5	At-Large
6	Clemson	ACC	18–13	At-Large
7	St. John's	Big East	22–9	At-Large
8	Rhode Island	Atlantic 10	22–8	At-Large
9	Murray State	Ohio Valley	29–3	Automatic
10	Detroit	MCC	24–5	At-Large
11	Western Michigan	Mid-American	20–7	At-Large
12	Florida State	ACC	17–13	At-Large
13	Valparaiso	Mid-Continent	21–9	Automatic
14	College of Charleston	TAAC	24–5	Automatic
15	Delaware	America East	20–9	Automatic
16	Prairie View A&M	SWAC	13–16	Automatic

== Bids by conference ==
Bids by Conference
Bids	Conference(s)
5	Atlantic 10, ACC, Big Ten, Big East, SEC
4	Big 12, Pac-10, WAC
3	C-USA, MCC (Horizon League)
2	MAC
1	19 others

== Bracket ==
=== East Regional – Greensboro, North Carolina ===
First round
1	North Carolina	88
16	Navy	52
Hartford
8	Charlotte	77
9	UIC	62
5	Princeton	69
12	UNLV	57
Hartford
4	Michigan State	83
13	Eastern Michigan	71
6	Xavier	68
11	Washington	69
Washington, D.C.
3	South Carolina	61
14	Richmond	62
7	Indiana	94^{OT}
10	Oklahoma	87
Washington, D.C.
2	Connecticut	93
15	Fairleigh Dickinson	85

Second Round
1	North Carolina	93^{OT}
8	Charlotte	83
5	Princeton	56
4	Michigan State	63
11	Washington	81
14	Richmond	66
7	Indiana	68
2	Connecticut	78

Regional semifinals
1	North Carolina	73
4	Michigan State	58
11	Washington	74
2	Connecticut	75

Regional Final
1	North Carolina	75
2	Connecticut	64

==== Regional Final Summary ====
CBS

Saturday, March 21

#1 North Carolina Tar Heels 75, #2 Connecticut Huskies 64
Scoring by half: 36–32, 39–32
Pts: A. Jamison – 20; Rebs: A. Jamison – 11; Asts: E. Cota – 9	Pts: K. El-Amin – 24; Rebs: K. Freeman – 7 Asts: M. Hardnett – 4

Greensboro Coliseum – Greensboro, NC
Attendance: 23,235
Referees: Mark Reischling, Eddie Jackson, Dick Cartmell

==== East Regional all-tournament team ====
- Antawn Jamison – North Carolina (MOP)
- Khalid El-Amin – UConn
- Richard Hamilton – UConn
- Vince Carter – North Carolina
- Ed Cota – North Carolina
- Shammond Williams – North Carolina

=== West Regional – Anaheim, California ===
First round
1	Arizona	99
16	Nicholls State	60
Sacramento
8	Tennessee	81
9	Illinois State	82^{OT}
5	Illinois	64
12	South Alabama	51
Sacramento
4	Maryland	82
13	Utah State	68
6	Arkansas	74
11	Nebraska	65
Boise
3	Utah	85
14	San Francisco	68
7	Temple	52
10	West Virginia	82
Boise
2	Cincinnati	65
15	Northern Arizona	62

Second Round
1	Arizona	82
9	Illinois State	49
5	Illinois	61
4	Maryland	67
6	Arkansas	69
3	Utah	75
10	West Virginia	75
2	Cincinnati	74

Regional semifinals
1	Arizona	87
4	Maryland	79
3	Utah	65
10	West Virginia	62

Regional Final
1	Arizona	51
3	Utah	76

==== Regional Final Summary ====
CBS

Saturday, March 21

box score

#3 Utah Utes 76, #1 Arizona Wildcats 51
Scoring by half: 29–20, 47–31
Pts: A. Miller – 18; Rebs: A. Miller – 14; Asts: A. Miller – 13	Pts: J. Terry – 16; Rebs: B. Davison – 10; Asts: M. Simon – 4

Arrowhead Pond – Anaheim, CA
Attendance: 17,851
Referees: Gerald Boudreaux, Tony Greene, Tom Rucker

==== West Regional all-tournament team ====
- Andre Miller – Utah (MOP)
- Mike Bibby – Arizona
- Michael Doleac – Utah
- Alex Jensen – Utah
- Hanno Mottola – Utah

=== South Regional – St. Petersburg, Florida ===
First round
1	Duke	99
16	Radford	63
Lexington
8	Oklahoma State	74
9	George Washington	59
5	Syracuse	63
12	Iona	61
Lexington
4	New Mexico	79
13	Butler	62
6	UCLA	65
11	Miami (FL)	62
Atlanta
3	~~Michigan~~	80
14	Davidson	61
7	Massachusetts	46
10	Saint Louis	51
Atlanta
2	Kentucky	82
15	South Carolina State	67

Second Round
1	Duke	79
8	Oklahoma State	73
5	Syracuse	56
4	New Mexico	46
6	UCLA	85
3	~~Michigan~~	82
10	Saint Louis	61
2	Kentucky	88

Regional semifinals
1	Duke	80
5	Syracuse	67
6	UCLA	68
2	Kentucky	94

Regional Final
1	Duke	84
2	Kentucky	86

All of Michigan's wins from the 1997–98 season were vacated on November 7, 2002, as part of the settlement of the University of Michigan basketball scandal. Unlike forfeiture, a vacated game does not result in the other school being credited with a win, only with the removal of any Michigan wins from all records.

==== Regional Final Summary ====
CBS

Sunday, March 22

box score

#2 Kentucky Wildcats 86, #1 Duke Blue Devils 84
Scoring by half: 39–49, 47–35
Pts: J. Sheppard – 18; Rebs: H. Evans, J. Sheppard – 11; Asts: W. Turner – 8	Pts: R. McLeod – 19; Rebs: R. McLeod, S. Battier – 8 Asts: S. Wojciechowski, T. Langdon – 4

Tropicana Field – St. Petersburg, FL
Attendance: 40,589
Referees: Tom Harrington, Mike Sanzere, Curtis Shaw

==== South Regional all-tournament team ====
- Wayne Turner – Kentucky (MOP)
- Trajan Langdon – Duke
- Roshown McLeod – Duke
- Scott Padgett – Kentucky
- Jeff Sheppard – Kentucky

=== Midwest Regional – St. Louis, Missouri ===
First round
1	Kansas	110
16	Prairie View A&M	52
Oklahoma City
8	Rhode Island	97
9	Murray State	74
5	TCU	87
12	Florida State	96
Oklahoma City
4	Ole Miss	69
13	Valparaiso	70
6	Clemson	72
11	Western Michigan	75
Chicago
3	Stanford	67
14	College of Charleston	57
7	St. John's	64
10	Detroit	66
Chicago
2	Purdue	95
15	Delaware	56

Second Round
1	Kansas	75
8	Rhode Island	80
12	Florida State	77
13	Valparaiso	83^{OT}
11	Western Michigan	65
3	Stanford	83
10	Detroit	65
2	Purdue	80

Regional semifinals
8	Rhode Island	74
13	Valparaiso	68
3	Stanford	67
2	Purdue	59

Regional Final
8	Rhode Island	77
3	Stanford	79

==== Regional Final Summary ====
CBS

Sunday, March 22

box score

#3 Stanford Cardinal 79, #8 Rhode Island 77
Scoring by half: 38–38, 41–39
Pts: A. Lee – 26; Rebs: T. Young – 12; Asts: A. Lee – 7	Pts: T. Wheeler – 24; Rebs: A. Reynolds-Dean – 10; Asts: T. Wheeler – 5

Kiel Center – St. Louis, MO
Attendance: 22,172
Referees: Frank Scagliotta, Mike Kitts, Larry Rose

==== Midwest Regional all-tournament team ====
- Arthur Lee – Stanford (MOP)
- Cuttino Mobley – Rhode Island
- Tyson Wheeler – Rhode Island
- Mark Madsen – Stanford
- Bryce Drew – Valparaiso

=== Final Four – San Antonio, Texas ===
National semifinals
E1	North Carolina	59
W3	Utah	65
S2	Kentucky	86^{OT}
MW3	Stanford	85

National Championship Game
W3	Utah	69
S2	Kentucky	78

==== National semifinals ====
CBS

Saturday, March 28

box score

#2 Kentucky Wildcats 86, #3 Stanford Cardinal 85 (OT)
Scoring by half: 32–37, 41–36 Overtime: 13–12
Pts: J. Sheppard – 27; Rebs: J.Sheppard, H. Evans, S. Padgett – 6 Asts: J. Sheppard, W. Turner – 4	Pts: A. Lee – 26; Rebs: M. Madsen – 16; Asts: A. Lee – 5

Alamodome – San Antonio, TX
Attendance: 40,509
Referees: Tim Higgins, Bob Donato, Larry Rose

CBS

Saturday, March, 28

box score

#3 Utah Utes 65, #1 North Carolina Tar Heels 59
Scoring by half: 35–22, 30–37
Pts: M. Doleac, A. Miller – 16; Rebs: A. Miller – 14; Asts: A. Miller – 7	Pts: V. Carter – 21; Rebs: A. Jamison – 12; Asts: E. Cota – 7

Alamodome – San Antonio, TX
Attendance: 40,590
Referees: John Clougherty, Andre Pattillo, Don Rutledge

==== National Championship ====
CBS

Monday, March 30

Box score

#2 Kentucky Wildcats 78, #3 Utah Utes 69
Scoring by half: 31–41, 47–28
Pts: S. Padgett – 17; Rebs: H. Evans – 6 Asts: A. Edwards – 5	Pts: A. Miller – 16; Rebs: M. Doleac – 10; Asts: A. Miller – 5

Alamodome – San Antonio, TX
Attendance: 40,509
Referees: Jim Burr, Donnie Gray, Mike Sanzere

==== Final Four all-tournament team ====
- Jeff Sheppard – Kentucky (MOP)
- Scott Padgett – Kentucky
- Arthur Lee – Stanford
- Andre Miller – Utah
- Michael Doleac – Utah

== Announcers ==
- Jim Nantz/Billy Packer/Michele Tafoya – First & Second Round at Atlanta, Georgia; South Regional at St. Petersburg, Florida; Final Four at San Antonio, Texas
- Sean McDonough/Bill Raftery/Andrea Joyce – First & Second Round at Washington, D.C.; East Regional at Greensboro, North Carolina
- Gus Johnson/Jon Sundvold/Armen Keteyian – First & Second Round at Hartford, Connecticut; West Regional at Anaheim, California
- Tim Brando/Al McGuire/Craig James – First & Second Round at Lexington, Kentucky; Midwest Regional at St. Louis, Missouri
- Ted Robinson/Rolando Blackman/Beth Mowins – First & Second Round at Oklahoma City, Oklahoma
- Jim Durham/Greg Kelser/Mike Mayock – First & Second Round at Boise, Idaho
- Tim Ryan/Dan Bonner/Jimmy Dykes – First & Second Round at Chicago, Illinois
- Ian Eagle/Jim Spanarkel/Mike Harris – First & Second Round at Sacramento, California

Greg Gumbel rejoined CBS Sports and for the first time served as the studio host, joined by analyst Clark Kellogg and former North Carolina coach Dean Smith.

== See also ==
- 1998 NCAA Division II men's basketball tournament
- 1998 NCAA Division III men's basketball tournament
- 1998 NCAA Division I women's basketball tournament
- 1998 NCAA Division II women's basketball tournament
- 1998 NCAA Division III women's basketball tournament
- 1998 National Invitation Tournament
- 1998 Women's National Invitation Tournament
- 1998 NAIA Division I men's basketball tournament
- 1998 NAIA Division II men's basketball tournament
