= 1997–98 Kentucky Wildcats men's basketball team =

1997–98 season of University of Kentucky men's basketball team

1997–98 Kentucky Wildcats men's basketball
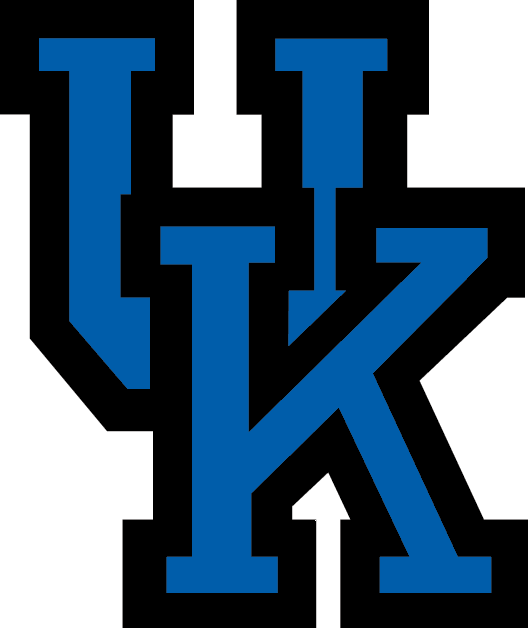

NCAA tournament National Champions SEC regular season and tournament champions

National Championship Game, W 78–69 vs. Utah
- Conference: Southeast Conference

Ranking
- Coaches: No. 1
- AP: No. 5
- Record: 35–4 (14–2 SEC)
- Head coach: Tubby Smith (1st season)
- Assistant coaches: Mike Sutton; George Felton; Shawn Finney
- Home arena: Rupp Arena

1997–98 Southeastern Conference men's basketball standings
	Conf.				Overall
Team	W		L	PCT	W		L	PCT
East
No. 5 Kentucky †	14	–	2	.875	35	–	4	.897
No. 14 South Carolina	11	–	5	.688	23	–	8	.742
Tennessee	9	–	7	.563	20	–	9	.690
Georgia	7	–	9	.438	20	–	15	.571
Vanderbilt	7	–	9	.438	20	–	13	.606
Florida	6	–	10	.375	14	–	15	.483
West
No. 13 Ole Miss	12	–	4	.750	22	–	7	.759
No. 17 Arkansas	11	–	5	.688	24	–	9	.727
Auburn	7	–	9	.438	16	–	14	.533
Alabama	6	–	10	.375	15	–	16	.484
Mississippi State	4	–	12	.250	15	–	15	.500
LSU	2	–	14	.125	9	–	18	.333
† 1998 SEC tournament winner Rankings from AP Poll

The 1997–98 Kentucky Wildcats men's basketball team were coached by Tubby Smith. He was in his first season as head coach after taking over from Rick Pitino. The team finished the season with a 35–4 record (14–2 SEC). Kentucky automatically qualified for the NCAA Tournament with a victory over South Carolina in the SEC Championship Game.

The Wildcats were invited to the 1998 NCAA Tournament as a #2 seed. In the Final Kentucky defeated the Utah Utes, 78–69.

== Roster ==
1997–98 Kentucky Wildcats men's basketball team
Players
Coaches

Pos.	#	Name	Height	Weight	Year	Hometown
G/F	3	Allen Edwards	6 ft 5 in (1.96 m)	205 lb (93 kg)	Sr	Miami, Florida
G	4	Steve Masiello	6 ft 1 in (1.85 m)	170 lb (77 kg)	So	White Plains, New York
G	5	Wayne Turner	6 ft 2 in (1.88 m)	190 lb (86 kg)	Jr	Boston, Massachusetts
G	11	Saul Smith	6 ft 2 in (1.88 m)	175 lb (79 kg)	Fr	Athens, Georgia
C	13	Nazr Mohammed	6 ft 10 in (2.08 m)	238 lb (108 kg)	Jr	Chicago, Illinois
F	14	Heshimu Evans	6 ft 6 in (1.98 m)	235 lb (107 kg)	Jr	Bronx, New York
G	15	Jeff Sheppard	6 ft 4 in (1.93 m)	189 lb (86 kg)	Sr	Peachtree City, Georgia
G	21	Cameron Mills	6 ft 3 in (1.91 m)	181 lb (82 kg)	Sr	Lexington, Kentucky
G	22	Ryan Hogan	6 ft 3 in (1.91 m)	193 lb (88 kg)	Fr	Deerfield, Illinois
F	25	Myron Anthony	6 ft 7 in (2.01 m)	225 lb (102 kg)	Fr	Neptune Beach, Florida
F/C	33	Michael Bradley	6 ft 10 in (2.08 m)	235 lb (107 kg)	Fr	Worcester, Massachusetts
F	34	Scott Padgett	6 ft 10 in (2.08 m)	240 lb (109 kg)	Jr	Louisville, Kentucky
C	42	Jamaal Magloire	6 ft 10 in (2.08 m)	260 lb (118 kg)	So	Toronto, Ontario

Head coach

- Tubby Smith

Assistant coach(es)

- Mike Sutton
- George Felton
- Shawn Finney

Legend

- (C) Team captain
- (S) Suspended
- (I) Ineligible
- (W) Walk-on
- Injured
- Current redshirt

=== Depth chart ===
Pos.	Starting 5	Bench 1	Bench 2	Bench 3
C	Nazr Mohammed	Jamaal Magloire	Michael Bradley
PF	Scott Padgett
SF	Allen Edwards	Heshimu Evans	Myron Anthony
SG	Jeff Sheppard	Cameron Mills	Ryan Hogan	Steve Masiello
PG	Wayne Turner	Saul Smith

== Schedule ==
=== November ===
The Tubby Smith-era officially began on November 18 with an 88 to 49 victory over Morehead State at Rupp Arena. Allen Edwards added 15 points, Wayne Turner had 12 points and Heshimu Evans had 10 points. Four days later Kentucky traveled to island of Maui to compete in the annual Maui Invitational Tournament, Kentucky defeated George Washington 70–55 in the first round of the tournament. The victory over the Colonials set up a game the next night in the semifinals against No. 1 Arizona, a rematch of the 1997 NCAA tournament championship Game. Kentucky experienced its first loss of the season with a 89–74 setback. After the loss the Wildcats rebounded the next night in the 3rd-place game against Missouri with a 77–55 victory. After Kentucky left Maui they traveled to Phoenix three days later to defeat No. 13 Clemson 76–61. Kentucky finished November ranked No. 7 in the AP poll and with a 4–1 record.

=== December ===
On December 3 Kentucky defeated No. 6 Purdue 89–75 in the annual Great Eight Classic in Chicago. Nazr Mohammed carried Kentucky with 19 points on 8 for 10 field goal shooting. Three days later Kentucky traveled to Indianapolis to defeat rival Indiana 75–72. Nazr Mohammed and Jeff Sheppard led the way with 21 points apiece. Four days later Kentucky traveled to Buffalo to defeat Canisius 81–54. On December 13 the Wildcats played its first home game in 23 days against No. 24 Georgia Tech. They defeated the Yellow Jackets 85–71 behind 14 points and 10 rebounds by Heshimu Evans. One-week later Kentucky defeated Tubby Smith's former school Tulsa 74–53. Three nights later Kentucky defeated American 75–52. Next, Kentucky played in-state rival Louisville in the annual Battle for the Bluegrass. Kentucky was upset by the Cardinals 79–76, due in part to the Wildcats shooting 5 for 23 from the 3-point line. Three nights later the Wildcats bounced back on the road in Athens, OH with a 95–58 victory over Ohio. Kentucky finished the 1997 calendar year with a 11–2 record and ranked 6th in the AP poll.

=== Results ===
Date time, TV	Rank^{#}	Opponent^{#}	Result	Record	High points	High rebounds	High assists	Site (attendance) city, state
Exhibition
November 11, 1997*; 7:30 pm	No. 9	Court Authority	W 86–62	0–0	20 – Edwards	6 – Tied	6 – Turner	Rupp Arena (20,041); Lexington, KY
November 18, 1997*; 8:00 pm, BBSN	No. 9	Melbourne	W 91–63	0–0	14 – Edwards	7 – Tied	4 – Tied	Rupp Arena (20,102); Lexington, KY
Non-conference regular season
November 20, 1997*; 8:00 pm, BBSN	No. 9	Morehead State	W 88–49	1–0	15 – Edwards	8 – Magloire	4 – Tied	Rupp Arena (23,097); Lexington, KY
November 24, 1997*; 9:30 pm, ESPN	No. 9	vs. George Washington; Maui Invitational Tournament first round	W 70–55	2–0	16 – Turner	11 – Evans	4 – Evans	Lahaina Civic Center (2,500); Lahaina, HI
November 25, 1997*; 9:00 pm, ESPN	No. 8	vs. No. 1 Arizona; Maui Invitational Tournament Semifinals	L 74–89	2–1	16 – Padgett	16 – Mohammed	4 – Tied	Lahaina Civic Center (2,500); Lahaina, HI
November 26, 1997*; 7:30 pm	No. 8	vs. Missouri; Maui Invitational Tournament 3rd-place game	W 77–55	3–1	18 – Magloire	17 – Magloire	5 – Sheppard	Lahaina Civic Center (2,500); Lahaina, HI
November 29, 1997*; 7:30 pm, SportsChannel	No. 8	vs. No. 13 Clemson	W 76–61	4–1	17 – Turner	6 – Mohammed	5 – Turner	America West Arena (4,306); Phoenix, AZ
December 3, 1997*; 9:30 pm, ESPN	No. 7	vs. No. 6 Purdue; Great Eight Classic	W 89–75	5–1	19 – Mohammed	9 – Padgett	8 – Turner	United Center (19,567); Chicago, IL
December 6, 1997*; 3:30 pm, CBS	No. 7	vs. Indiana	W 75–72	6–1	21 – Tied	12 – Mohammed	5 – Turner	RCA Dome (38,504); Indianapolis, IN
December 10, 1997*; 8:00 pm, BBSN	No. 4	at Canisius	W 81–54	7–1	21 – Sheppard	8 – Turner	6 – Turner	Marine Midland Arena (10,083); Buffalo, NY
December 13, 1997*; 12:00 pm, ESPN	No. 4	No. 24 Georgia Tech	W 85–71	8–1	14 – Evans	10 – Evans	6 – Edwards	Rupp Arena (24,112); Lexington, KY
December 20, 1997*; 7:30 pm, ESPN	No. 4	Tulsa	W 74–53	9–1	17 – Mohammed	8 – Padgett	5 – Edwards	Rupp Arena (24,082); Lexington, KY
December 23, 1997*; 8:00 pm, BBSN	No. 4	American	W 74–53	10–1	16 – Edwards	6 – Magloire	5 – Tied	Rupp Arena (22,856); Lexington, KY
December 27, 1997*; 4:00 pm, CBS	No. 4	Louisville	L 76–79	10–2	18 – Sheppard	9 – Mohammed	4 – Padgett	Rupp Arena (24,303); Lexington, KY
December 30, 1997*; 7:00 pm, BBSN	No. 6	at Ohio	W 95–58	11–2	15 – Tied	7 – Mohammed	4 – Tied	Convocation Center (13,083); Athens, OH
January 3, 1998; 6:00 pm, JP Sports	No. 6	Vanderbilt	W 71–62	12–2 (1–0)	19 – Mohammed	14 – Padgett	5 – Edwards	Rupp Arena (24,236); Lexington, KY
January 6, 1998; 9:30 pm, ESPN	No. 6	at Georgia	W 90–79	13–2 (2–0)	20 – Turner	7 – Tied	5 – Turner	Stegeman Coliseum (10,523); Athens, GA
January 10, 1998; 4:30 pm, JP Sports	No. 6	at Mississippi State	W 77–71	14–2 (3–0)	23 – Padgett	10 – Padgett	4 – Turner	Humphrey Coliseum (9,334); Starkville, MS
January 13, 1998; 9:30 pm, ESPN	No. 6	No. 14 South Carolina	W 91–70	15–2 (4–0)	16 – Sheppard	8 – Mohammed	12 – Edwards	Rupp Arena (24,241); Lexington, KY
January 17, 1998; 4:00 pm, CBS	No. 6	No. 22 Arkansas	W 80–77 ^{OT}	16–2 (5–0)	20 – Evans	13 – Mohammed	4 – Sheppard	Rupp Arena (24,266); Lexington, KY
January 21, 1998; 8:00 pm, JP Sports	No. 7	Alabama	W 70–67	17–2 (6–0)	24 – Padgett	10 – Mohammed	4 – Turner	Freedom Hall (19,734); Louisville, KY
January 24, 1998; 7:30 pm, JP Sports	No. 7	at Tennessee	W 90–79	18–2 (7–0)	20 – Padgett	7 – Tied	11 – Turner	Thompson-Boling Arena (23,146); Knoxville, TN
January 27, 1998; 9:30 pm, ESPN	No. 7	at Vanderbilt	W 63–61	19–2 (8–0)	20 – Padgett	7 – Tied	11 – Turner	Memorial Gymnasium (15,311); Nashville, TN
February 1, 1998; 3:30 pm, ABC	No. 7	Florida	L 78–86	19–3 (8–1)	31 – Mills	10 – Evans	4 – Turner	Rupp Arena (24,186); Lexington, KY
February 4, 1998; 8:00 pm, JP Sports	No. 8	at LSU	W 63–61	20–3 (9–1)	12 – Sheppard	3 – Evans	4 – Sheppard	Pete Maravich Assembly Center (8,686); Baton Rouge, LA
February 8, 1998*; 1:00 pm, CBS	No. 8	at Villanova	W 79–63	21–3 (9–1)	18 – Tied	11 – Mohammed	6 – Edwards	CoreStates Center (15,551); Philadelphia, PA
February 11, 1998; 8:00 pm, JP Sports	No. 7	Tennessee	W 80–74	22–3 (10–1)	21 – Mohammed	16 – Mohammed	5 – Evans	Rupp Arena (23,861); Lexington, KY
February 14, 1998; 12:30 pm, JP Sports	No. 7	No. 18 Ole Miss	L 64–73	22–4 (10–2)	15 – Sheppard	8 – Mohammed	4 – Tied	Rupp Arena (23,842); Lexington, KY
February 18, 1998; 8:00 pm, JP Sports	No. 8	at Florida	W 79–54	23–4 (11–2)	19 – Mohammed	6 – Tied	5 – Turner	O'Connell Center (10,222); Gainesville, FL
February 22, 1998; 1:00 pm, JP Sports	No. 8	Georgia	W 85–74	24–4 (12–2)	16 – Mohammed	11 – Mohammed	8 – Sheppard	Rupp Arena (24,272); Lexington, KY
February 25, 1998; 8:00 pm, JP Sports	No. 7	at Auburn	W 83–58	25–4 (13–2)	25 – Sheppard	7 – Padgett	5 – Padgett	Beard–Eaves–Memorial Coliseum (9,644); Auburn, AL
February 25, 1998; 1:00 pm, CBS	No. 7	at No. 14 South Carolina	W 89–57	26–4 (14–2)	24 – Sheppard	12 – Evans	5 – Turner	Carolina Coliseum (12,129); Columbia, SC
SEC Tournament
March 6, 1998; 1:00 pm, JP Sports	(E1) No. 7	vs. (W5) Alabama; Quarterfinals	W 82–71	27–4	17 – Sheppard	13 – Padgett	8 – Turner	Georgia Dome (21,109); Atlanta, GA
March 7, 1998; 1:00 pm, JP Sports	(E1) No. 7	vs. (W2) No. 16 Arkansas; Semifinals	W 99–74	28–4	17 – Sheppard	10 – Mohammed	7 – Turner	Georgia Dome (25,190); Atlanta, GA
March 8, 1998; 12:00 pm, CBS	(E1) No. 7	vs. (E2) No. 15 South Carolina; Championship Game	W 86–56	29–4	18 – Turner	7 – Mohammed	5 – Edwards	Georgia Dome (24,545); Atlanta, GA
NCAA tournament
March 13, 1998; 12:15 pm, CBS	(2 S) No. 5	vs. (15 S) South Carolina State; First Round	W 82–67	30–4	18 – Mohammed	6 – Tied	6 – Edwards	Georgia Dome (17,474); Atlanta, GA
March 15, 1998; 2:30 pm, CBS	(2 S) No. 5	vs. (10 S) St. Louis; Second Round	W 88–61	31–4	18 – Sheppard	8 – Mohammed	9 – Turner	Georgia Dome (19,423); Atlanta, GA
March 20, 1998; 10:00 pm, CBS	(2 S) No. 5	vs. (6 S) No. 19 UCLA; Sweet Sixteen	W 94–68	32–4	19 – Padgett	6 – Padgett	5 – Edwards	Tropicana Field (40,589); St. Petersburg, FL
March 23, 1998; 5:00 pm, CBS	(2 S) No. 5	vs. (1 S) No. 3 Duke; Elite Eight	W 86–84	33–4	18 – Sheppard	11 – Tied	8 – Turner	Tropicana Field (40,589); St. Petersburg, FL
March 28, 1998; 5:42 pm, CBS	(2 S) No. 5	vs. (3 MW) No. 10 Stanford; Final Four	W 86–85 ^{OT}	34–4	27 – Sheppard	6 – Tied	4 – Tied	Alamodome (40,509); San Antonio, TX
March 30, 1998; 9:17 pm, CBS	(2 S) No. 5	vs. (3 W) No. 7 Utah; National Championship	W 78–69	35–4	17 – Padgett	6 – Evans	5 – Edwards	Alamodome (40,509); San Antonio, TX
*Non-conference game. ^{#}Rankings from AP Poll. (#) Tournament seedings in parentheses. All times are in Eastern Time.

== Team players drafted into the NBA ==
Year	Round	Pick	Player	NBA Club
1998	1	29	Nazr Mohammed	Utah Jazz
1999	1	28	Scott Padgett	Utah Jazz
2000	1	19	Jamaal Magloire	Charlotte Hornets

== See also ==
- Kentucky Wildcats men's basketball
- 1998 NCAA Division I men's basketball tournament
