= David Hobbs (basketball) =

American college basketball player

Biographical details
- Born: April 25, 1949 (age 77); Lynchburg, Virginia, U.S.

Playing career
- 1968–1970: Ferrum JC
- 1970–1972: VCU

Coaching career (HC unless noted)
- 1972–1979: Mechanicsville High School
- 1980–1985: VCU (assistant)
- 1985–1992: Alabama (assistant)
- 1992–1998: Alabama
- 2000–2007: Kentucky (assistant)
- 2009: Japan
- 2016–2021: Iowa State (special asst. to HC)

Head coaching record
- Overall: 110–76 (college)
- Tournaments: 2–2 (NCAA Division I); 3–3 (NIT)

David A. Hobbs (born April 25, 1949) is an American former basketball coach. Hobbs previously served as a special assistant to Iowa State's head coach Steve Prohm. He was the men's head coach at the University of Alabama from 1992 to 1998 and also was an assistant coach at Alabama, the University of Kentucky and Virginia Commonwealth University (VCU).

== Early years ==
Hobbs was born in Lynchburg, Virginia. He lettered his junior and senior seasons (1970–71) at Virginia Commonwealth University (VCU), where he earned a bachelor's degree in education (1972) after spending his first two seasons playing at Virginia's Ferrum Junior College.

== Coaching career ==
Throughout his career, Hobbs has coached teams to more than 400 victories and 18 postseason tournament appearances, including 16 in the NCAA tournament.

His coaching career began in the prep ranks at Mechanicsville High School in Mechanicsville, Virginia for eight seasons, the last three as head coach.

=== Virginia Commonwealth ===
His first job in college coaching came at Virginia Commonwealth, where he served as an assistant coach with Tubby Smith on J. D. Barnett's staff. Hobbs spent six years (1980–85) coaching on the Rams' staff.

=== Alabama ===
Hobbs was hired at Alabama as an assistant coach for Wimp Sanderson in 1985 and spent the next seven years at that position, helping the Crimson Tide win one SEC Championship and four SEC Tournament crowns while the Tide made four appearances in the NCAA tournament's Sweet 16. As an assistant, he had the opportunity to coach such All-SEC performers as Robert Horry, James "Hollywood" Robinson and Latrell Sprewell.

When Sanderson left Alabama following the 1992 season, Hobbs was named head coach. In his first season, the Tide finished 16–13 and advanced to the NIT. In 1994 and 1995, Alabama recorded 20-win seasons and advanced to the NCAA Tournament behind the play of future NBA All-Star Antonio McDyess. In 1996, Hobbs led UA to a 19–13 mark and a berth in the NIT Final Four. He resigned his post following the 1997–98 season after compiling a 110–76 (59.4%) career record and producing nine All-SEC players.

== Kentucky ==
David Hobbs joined the UK staff in 2000 and served seven years as an assistant coach under Tubby Smith, including five as assistant head coach. He was not retained by the university when Smith left in 2007.

== After departure from Kentucky ==
After leaving Kentucky, Hobbs was a scout for the NBA's Charlotte Bobcats for two years, followed by a short stint as coach of Japan's national basketball team. He was terminated from that job after being on medical leave.

== Family ==
Hobbs is married to Barbara "Skeet" Fleet Hobbs and they have two grown children, Heather and David Jr.

== Head coaching record ==
=== College ===
Record table
Season	Team	Overall	Conference	Standing	Postseason
Alabama Crimson Tide (Southeastern Conference) (1992–1998)
1992–93	Alabama	16–13	7–9	4th (West)	NIT First Round
1993–94	Alabama	20–10	12–4	2nd (West)	NCAA Division I Second Round
1994–95	Alabama	23–10	10–6	3rd (West)	NCAA Division I Second Round
1995–96	Alabama	19–13	9–7	3rd (West)	NIT Fourth Place
1996–97	Alabama	17–14	6–10	4th (West)	
1997–98	Alabama	15–16	6–10	4th (West)	
Alabama:		110–76 (.591)	50–46 (.521)		
Total:		110–176 (.591)			
