= 1997–98 Arkansas Razorbacks men's basketball team =

American college basketball season

1997–98 Arkansas Razorbacks men's basketball

NCAA tournament, Round of 32
- Conference: Southeastern Conference
- West

Ranking
- Coaches: No. 22
- AP: No. 17
- Record: 24–9 (11–5 SEC)
- Head coach: Nolan Richardson (13th season)
- Home arena: Bud Walton Arena

1997–98 Southeastern Conference men's basketball standings
	Conf.				Overall
Team	W		L	PCT	W		L	PCT
East
No. 5 Kentucky †	14	–	2	.875	35	–	4	.897
No. 14 South Carolina	11	–	5	.688	23	–	8	.742
Tennessee	9	–	7	.563	20	–	9	.690
Georgia	7	–	9	.438	20	–	15	.571
Vanderbilt	7	–	9	.438	20	–	13	.606
Florida	6	–	10	.375	14	–	15	.483
West
No. 13 Ole Miss	12	–	4	.750	22	–	7	.759
No. 17 Arkansas	11	–	5	.688	24	–	9	.727
Auburn	7	–	9	.438	16	–	14	.533
Alabama	6	–	10	.375	15	–	16	.484
Mississippi State	4	–	12	.250	15	–	15	.500
LSU	2	–	14	.125	9	–	18	.333
† 1998 SEC tournament winner Rankings from AP Poll

The 1997–98 Arkansas Razorbacks men's basketball team represented the University of Arkansas in the 1997–98 college basketball season. The head coach was Nolan Richardson, serving for his 13th year. The team played its home games in Bud Walton Arena in Fayetteville, Arkansas.

== Roster ==
1997–98 Arkansas Razorbacks men's basketball team
Players
Coaches

Pos.	#	Name	Height	Weight	Year	Previous school	Hometown
G	22	Pat Bradley	6 ft 2 in (1.88 m)	196 lb (89 kg)	Jr	Everett	Everett, Massachusetts
PF	55	Derek Hood	6 ft 8 in (2.03 m)	215 lb (98 kg)	Jr	Central	Kansas City, Missouri

Head coach

- Nolan Richardson

Assistant coach(es)

Legend

- (C) Team captain
- (S) Suspended
- (I) Ineligible
- (W) Walk-on
- Injured
- Current redshirt

== Schedule and results ==
Date time, TV	Rank^{#}	Opponent^{#}	Result	Record	Site city, state
Exhibition
Nov 4, 1997*		Around World All Stars	W 106–76		Bud Walton Arena; Fayetteville, Arkansas
Nov 12, 1997*		Converse All-Stars	W 108–88		Bud Walton Arena; Fayetteville, Arkansas
Regular Season
Nov 16, 1997*		Northeastern Illinois	W 114–56	1–0	Bud Walton Arena; Fayetteville, Arkansas
Nov 21, 1997*		Jackson State	W 97–71	2–0	Bud Walton Arena; Fayetteville, Arkansas
Nov 25, 1997*		Oral Roberts	W 81–75	3–0	Bud Walton Arena; Fayetteville, Arkansas
Nov 29, 1997*		vs. No. 12 Fresno State; Premier Classic	W 70–69	4–0	Phoenix, Arizona
Dec 2, 1997*	No. 18	Bethune–Cookman	W 108–42	5–0	Bud Walton Arena; Fayetteville, Arkansas
Dec 6, 1997*	No. 18	Missouri	W 75–46	6–0	Bud Walton Arena; Fayetteville, Arkansas
Dec 9, 1997*	No. 15	at Louisville	W 100–83	7–0	Freedom Hall; Louisville, Kentucky
Dec 18, 1997*	No. 13	Centenary	W 61–48	8–0	Bud Walton Arena; Fayetteville, Arkansas
Dec 24, 1997*	No. 12	at American-Puerto Rico; Puerto Rico Holiday Classic	L 59–64	8–1	Eugene Guerra Sports Complex; San Juan, Puerto Rico
Dec 25, 1997*	No. 12	vs. Murray State; Puerto Rico Holiday Classic	L 83–94	8–2	Eugene Guerra Sports Complex; San Juan, Puerto Rico
Dec 26, 1997*	No. 12	vs. Saint Louis; Puerto Rico Holiday Classic	W 78–70	9–2	Eugene Guerra Sports Complex; San Juan, Puerto Rico
Dec 31, 1997*	No. 23	Alabama State	W 103–48	10–2	Bud Walton Arena; Fayetteville, Arkansas
Jan 4, 1998	No. 23	LSU	W 62–59	11–2 (1–0)	Bud Walton Arena; Fayetteville, Arkansas
Jan 7, 1998	No. 22	Mississippi State	W 83–70	12–2 (2–0)	Bud Walton Arena; Fayetteville, Arkansas
Jan 10, 1998*	No. 22	at Memphis	W 75–72	13–2	Pyramid Arena; Memphis, Tennessee
Jan 14, 1998	No. 22	Florida	W 89–84	14–2 (3–0)	Bud Walton Arena; Fayetteville, Arkansas
Jan 17, 1998; 3:00 p.m., CBS	No. 22	at No. 6 Kentucky	L 77–80 ^{OT}	14–3 (3–1)	Rupp Arena (24,266); Lexington, Kentucky
Jan 21, 1998	No. 18	at Auburn	W 79–65	15–3 (4–1)	Beard–Eaves–Memorial Coliseum (7,238); Auburn, Alabama
Jan 24, 1998	No. 18	Alabama	W 77–70	16–3 (5–1)	Bud Walton Arena; Fayetteville, Arkansas
Jan 28, 1998	No. 15	at LSU	W 85–68	17–3 (6–1)	Maravich Assembly Center; Baton Rouge, Louisiana
Jan 31, 1998	No. 15	at Mississippi State	W 76–73	18–3 (7–1)	Humphrey Coliseum; Starkville, Mississippi
Feb 5, 1998	No. 14	No. 17 Ole Miss	W 100–87	19–3 (8–1)	Bud Walton Arena; Fayetteville, Arkansas
Feb 7, 1998	No. 14	Vanderbilt	W 93–83	20–3 (9–1)	Bud Walton Arena; Fayetteville, Arkansas
Feb 10, 1998	No. 14	at Georgia	L 70–86	20–4 (9–2)	Stegeman Coliseum; Athens, Georgia
Feb 14, 1998	No. 12	at Tennessee	L 71–74	20–5 (9–3)	Thompson–Boling Arena; Knoxville, Tennessee
Feb 18, 1998	No. 16	No. 13 South Carolina	W 96–88	21–5 (10–3)	Bud Walton Arena; Fayetteville, Arkansas
Feb 21, 1998	No. 16	Auburn	W 107–83	22–5 (11–3)	Bud Walton Arena (22,242); Fayetteville, Arkansas
Feb 25, 1998	No. 12	at No. 13 Ole Miss	L 65–81	22–6 (11–4)	Tad Smith Coliseum; Oxford, Mississippi
Feb 28, 1998	No. 12	at Alabama	L 63–65	22–7 (11–5)	Coleman Coliseum; Tuscaloosa, Alabama
SEC Tournament
Mar 6, 1998*; JP Sports	(W2) No. 16	vs. (E3) Tennessee; Quarterfinals	W 102–96	23–7	Georgia Dome; Atlanta, Georgia
Mar 7, 1998*; JP Sports	(W2) No. 16	vs. (E1) No. 7 Kentucky; Semifinals	L 74–99	23–8	Georgia Dome (25,190); Atlanta, Georgia
NCAA Tournament
Mar 12, 1998*; CBS	(6 W) No. 17	vs. (11 W) Nebraska; First Round	W 74–65	24–8	BSU Pavilion; Boise, Idaho
Mar 14, 1998*; CBS	(6 W) No. 17	vs. (3 W) No. 7 Utah; Second Round	L 69–75	24–9	BSU Pavilion; Boise, Idaho
*Non-conference game. ^{#}Rankings from AP Poll. (#) Tournament seedings in parentheses. W=West. All times are in Central Time.
