= George Felton =

American basketball coach and scout

Biographical details
- Born: December 28, 1952 (age 73); The Bronx, New York, U.S.

Playing career
- 1973–1974: South Carolina

Coaching career (HC unless noted)
- 1976–1981: Appalachian State (assistant)
- 1981–1986: Georgia Tech (associate HC)
- 1986–1991: South Carolina
- 1991–1992: Georgia Tech (assistant)
- 1992–1995: St. John's (assistant)
- 1995–1997: Oregon State (assistant)
- 1997–2000: Kentucky (assistant)
- 2000–2001: Kentucky (associate HC)

Head coaching record
- Overall: 87–62 (.584)
- Tournaments: 0–1 (NCAA Division I); 1–1 (NIT)

George Felton (born December 28, 1952) is a former American college basketball coach. He was the head coach of the South Carolina Gamecocks men's basketball team from 1986 to 1991. Felton has also served as a scout for the San Antonio Spurs and Indiana Pacers of the National Basketball Association (NBA).

Felton was born in the Bronx, New York, and attended All Hallows High School. He played college basketball for the South Carolina Gamecocks. Felton started his coaching career as an assistant coach under Bobby Cremins with the Appalachian State Mountaineers from 1976 to 1981. He followed Cremins to the Georgia Tech Yellow Jackets in 1981 and was appointed as associate head coach. Felton was hired by his alma mater to become the head coach of the Gamecocks in 1986. He led the team to a 87–62 record for five seasons until he was fired in May 1991 with one year remaining on his contract. Felton rejoined Cremins at Georgia Tech as an unpaid assistant for the 1991–92 season because of his buyout at South Carolina. He became a full-time assistant in 1992 when he joined head coach Brian Mahoney with the St. John's Red Storm for three seasons. Felton was hired as an assistant for the Oregon State Beavers in 1995 where he served under Eddie Payne, his former Gamecocks assistant coach. He joined the staff of another former assistant, Tubby Smith, with the Kentucky Wildcats in 1997 and won a national championship with the team in 1998.

Felton left the collegiate coaching ranks in 2001 to join the Indiana Pacers as a scout. He was hired by the San Antonio Spurs as the director of college player personnel in 2006.

== Head coaching record ==
Record table
| Season | Team | Overall | Conference | Standing | Postseason |
|---|---|---|---|---|---|
South Carolina Gamecocks (Metro Conference) (1986–1991)
| 1986–87 | South Carolina | 15–14 | 5–7 | T–5th | |
| 1987–88 | South Carolina | 19–10 | 6–6 | T–3rd | |
| 1988–89 | South Carolina | 19–11 | 8–4 | T–2nd | NCAA Division I First Round |
| 1989–90 | South Carolina | 14–14 | 6–8 | T–5th | |
| 1990–91 | South Carolina | 20–13 | 5–9 | 7th | NIT Second Round |
| South Carolina: | | 87–62 (.584) | 30–34 (.469) | | |
| Total: | | 87–62 (.584) | | | |
