= 1998 SEC men's basketball tournament =

- Classification: Division I
- Season: 1997–98
- Site: Georgia Dome; Atlanta, Georgia
- Champions: Kentucky (22nd title)
- Winning coach: Tubby Smith (1st title)
- MVP: Wayne Turner (Kentucky)
- Television: Jefferson Pilot Sports (First and Second Rounds, and semifinals); CBS (Championship Game)

1997–98 Southeastern Conference men's basketball standings
	Conf.				Overall
Team	W		L	PCT	W		L	PCT
East
No. 5 Kentucky †	14	–	2	.875	35	–	4	.897
No. 14 South Carolina	11	–	5	.688	23	–	8	.742
Tennessee	9	–	7	.563	20	–	9	.690
Georgia	7	–	9	.438	20	–	15	.571
Vanderbilt	7	–	9	.438	20	–	13	.606
Florida	6	–	10	.375	14	–	15	.483
West
No. 13 Ole Miss	12	–	4	.750	22	–	7	.759
No. 17 Arkansas	11	–	5	.688	24	–	9	.727
Auburn	7	–	9	.438	16	–	14	.533
Alabama	6	–	10	.375	15	–	16	.484
Mississippi State	4	–	12	.250	15	–	15	.500
LSU	2	–	14	.125	9	–	18	.333
† 1998 SEC tournament winner Rankings from AP Poll

The 1998 SEC men's basketball tournament took place from March 5–8, 1998 at the Georgia Dome in Atlanta, Georgia. Kentucky won the tournament and received the SEC's automatic bid to the NCAA tournament by beating the South Carolina Gamecocks on March 8, 1998.

== Television coverage ==
Tournament coverage in the first and second rounds, and the semi-finals were provided by Jefferson Pilot Sports, who at the time was in its 11th season with regional syndication rights to the SEC. The championship game, however, was broadcast by CBS Sports.

== Bracket ==
First round
W5	Mississippi State	76
E4	Georgia	79
W3	Auburn	64
E6	Florida	68
E5	Vanderbilt	62
W4	Alabama	72
E3	Tennessee	73
W6	LSU	62

Quarterfinals
W1	#10 Mississippi	72
E4	Georgia	67
E2	#15 South Carolina	71
E6	Florida	60
E1	#7 Kentucky	82
W4	Alabama	71
W2	#16 Arkansas	102
E3	Tennessee	96

Semifinals
W1	#10 Mississippi	77
E2	#15 South Carolina	87
E1	#7 Kentucky	99
W2	#16 Arkansas	74

Championship game
E2	#15 South Carolina	56
E1	#7 Kentucky	86

== Tournament notes ==
- This was Tubby Smith’s first SEC tournament title win as head coach of the Kentucky Wildcats.
