= 1997–98 Florida Gators men's basketball team =

American college basketball season

1997–98 Florida Gators men's basketball

NIT, 1st round
- Conference: Southeastern Conference
- East
- Record: 14-15 (6-10 SEC)
- Head coach: Billy Donovan
- Home arena: O'Connell Center

1997–98 Southeastern Conference men's basketball standings
	Conf.				Overall
Team	W		L	PCT	W		L	PCT
East
No. 5 Kentucky †	14	–	2	.875	35	–	4	.897
No. 14 South Carolina	11	–	5	.688	23	–	8	.742
Tennessee	9	–	7	.563	20	–	9	.690
Georgia	7	–	9	.438	20	–	15	.571
Vanderbilt	7	–	9	.438	20	–	13	.606
Florida	6	–	10	.375	14	–	15	.483
West
No. 13 Ole Miss	12	–	4	.750	22	–	7	.759
No. 17 Arkansas	11	–	5	.688	24	–	9	.727
Auburn	7	–	9	.438	16	–	14	.533
Alabama	6	–	10	.375	15	–	16	.484
Mississippi State	4	–	12	.250	15	–	15	.500
LSU	2	–	14	.125	9	–	18	.333
† 1998 SEC tournament winner Rankings from AP Poll

The 1997–98 Florida Gators men's basketball team represented the University of Florida in the sport of basketball during the 1997-98 college basketball season. The Gators competed in Division I of the National Collegiate Athletic Association (NCAA) and the Eastern Division of the Southeastern Conference (SEC). They were led by head coach Billy Donovan, and played their home games in the O'Connell Center on the university's Gainesville, Florida campus.

On December 27, 1997, Florida lost to UAB 80-73 in the Orange Bowl Basketball Classic in Miami, Florida.

The team finished the season with a 14-15 record. The Gators lost in the 2nd round of the SEC tournament to South Carolina 71-60. In the 1998 NIT, they lost in the 1st round to Georgetown 71-69.
