= 1997–98 Utah Utes men's basketball team =

American college basketball season

1997–98 Utah Utes men's basketball

NCAA tournament, runner up WAC regular season champion

National Championship Game, L 69–78 vs. Kentucky
- Conference: Western Athletic Conference
- Mountain

Ranking
- Coaches: No. 2
- AP: No. 7
- Record: 30–4 (12–2 WAC)
- Head coach: Rick Majerus (9th season)
- Captains: Michael Doleac; Drew Hansen
- Home arena: Jon M. Huntsman Center

1997–98 WAC men's basketball standings
	Conf.				Overall
Team	W		L	PCT	W		L	PCT
Mountain
No. 7 Utah	12	–	2	.857	30	–	4	.882
No. 18 New Mexico	11	–	3	.786	24	–	8	.750
Wyoming	9	–	5	.643	19	–	9	.679
Colorado State	8	–	6	.571	20	–	9	.690
UNLV †	7	–	7	.500	20	–	13	.606
BYU	4	–	10	.286	9	–	21	.300
UTEP	3	–	11	.214	12	–	14	.462
Air Force	2	–	12	.143	10	–	16	.385
Pacific
No. 15 TCU	14	–	0	1.000	27	–	6	.818
Fresno State	10	–	4	.714	21	–	13	.618
Tulsa	9	–	5	.643	19	–	12	.613
Hawaii	8	–	6	.571	21	–	9	.700
SMU	6	–	8	.429	18	–	10	.643
San Diego State	5	–	9	.357	13	–	15	.464
Rice	3	–	11	.214	6	–	22	.214
San Jose State	1	–	13	.071	3	–	23	.115
† 1998 WAC tournament winner Rankings from AP Poll

The 1997–98 Utah Utes men's basketball team represented the University of Utah as a member of the Western Athletic Conference during the 1997–98 men's basketball season. Led by head coach Rick Majerus, the Utes made a run through the NCAA tournament all the way to the National Championship Game and finished with an overall record of 30–4 (12–2 WAC).

Including the previous season, Utah won 59 of 67 games overall and 27 of 30 games in conference play.

== Roster ==
1997–98 Utah Utes men's basketball team
Players
Coaches

Pos.	#	Name	Height	Weight	Year	Hometown
SF	3	David Jackson	6 ft 5 in (1.96 m)	215 lb (98 kg)	So	Portland, Oregon
PG	11	Jordie McTavish	6 ft 1 in (1.85 m)	160 lb (73 kg)	Fr	Salmon Arm, BC, Canada
F/C	13	Hanno Möttölä	6 ft 10 in (2.08 m)	250 lb (113 kg)	So	Helsinki, Finland
SG	15	Derek Broomhall	6 ft 5 in (1.96 m)	210 lb (95 kg)	Jr	Sacramento, California
SG	21	Trace Caton	6 ft 4 in (1.93 m)	211 lb (96 kg)	Fr	Alamosa, Colorado
PG	24	Andre Miller	6 ft 3 in (1.91 m)	200 lb (91 kg)	Jr	Los Angeles, California
F	31	Britton Johnsen	6 ft 10 in (2.08 m)	240 lb (109 kg)	Fr	Murray, Utah
G	34	Drew Hansen	—	—	Sr
G	35	Jeff Johnsen	6 ft 4 in (1.93 m)	200 lb (91 kg)	So	Murray, Utah
C	42	Jon Carlisle	6 ft 10 in (2.08 m)	260 lb (118 kg)	Fr	Salt Lake City, Utah
F	50	Alex Jensen	6 ft 7 in (2.01 m)	225 lb (102 kg)	So	Bountiful, Utah
C	51	Michael Doleac (C)	6 ft 11 in (2.11 m)	260 lb (118 kg)	Sr	Portland, Oregon

Head coach

- Rick Majerus (Marquette)

Assistant coach(es)

Legend

- (C) Team captain
- (S) Suspended
- (I) Ineligible
- (W) Walk-on
- Injured
- Current redshirt

== Schedule and results ==
Date time, TV	Rank^{#}	Opponent^{#}	Result	Record	Site city, state
Non-conference regular season
November 15*	No. 16	Cal State Fullerton	W 87–59	1–0	Jon M. Huntsman Center; Salt Lake City, UT
November 19*	No. 16	at Weber State	W 87–72	2–0	Dee Events Center; Ogden, UT
November 22*	No. 16	Southern Utah	W 66–48	3–0	Jon M. Huntsman Center; Salt Lake City, UT
November 25*	No. 16	at Loyola Marymount	W 89–50	4–0	Gersten Pavilion; Los Angeles, CA
November 29*	No. 16	UC Irvine	W 83–45	5–0	Jon M. Huntsman Center (12,921); Salt Lake City, UT
December 2*	No. 11	vs. Providence; Great Eight Tournament	W 64–58	6–0	United Center; Chicago, IL
December 6*	No. 11	at No. 24 Wake Forest	W 62–53	7–0	LJVM Coliseum; Winston-Salem, NC
December 10*	No. 9	Utah State	W 71–55	8–0	Jon M. Huntsman Center; Salt Lake City, UT
December 12*	No. 9	Azusa Pacific	W 78–58	9–0	Jon M. Huntsman Center; Salt Lake City, UT
December 20*	No. 7	at Oregon State; Ford Holiday Classic	W 69–61	10–0	Rose Garden; Portland, OR
December 27*	No. 6	at Milwaukee	W 65–51	11–0	Wisconsin Center Arena; Milwaukee, WI
January 3	No. 4	Rice	W 73–65	12–0	Jon M. Huntsman Center; Salt Lake City, UT
January 10	No. 3	at BYU	W 71–61	13–0	Marriott Center; Provo, UT
WAC regular season
January 15	No. 4	Colorado State	W 65–51	14–0 (1–0)	Jon M. Huntsman Center; Salt Lake City, UT
January 17	No. 4	Wyoming	W 75–58	15–0 (2–0)	Jon M. Huntsman Center; Salt Lake City, UT
January 22	No. 4	at Air Force	W 57–46	16–0 (3–0)	Clune Arena; Colorado Springs, CO
January 24	No. 4	at UNLV	W 67–54	17–0 (4–0)	Thomas & Mack Center; Las Vegas, NV
January 29	No. 3	UTEP	W 62–56	18–0 (5–0)	Jon M. Huntsman Center; Salt Lake City, UT
February 1	No. 3	at No. 14 New Mexico	L 74–77	18–1 (5–1)	University Arena; Albuquerque, NM
February 5	No. 5	BYU	W 83–68	19–1 (6–1)	Jon M. Huntsman Center; Salt Lake City, UT
February 7	No. 5	at Rice	W 60–49	20–1 (7–1)	Rice Gymnasium; Houston, TX
February 12	No. 5	at Wyoming	L 56–62	20–2 (7–2)	Arena-Auditorium; Laramie, WY
February 14	No. 5	at Colorado State	W 60–48	21–2 (8–2)	Moby Arena; Fort Collins, CO
February 21	No. 6	Air Force	W 55–41	22–2 (9–2)	Jon M. Huntsman Center; Salt Lake City, UT
February 23	No. 6	UNLV	W 79–68	23–2 (10–2)	Jon M. Huntsman Center; Salt Lake City, UT
February 26	No. 5	at UTEP	W 87–70	24–2 (11–2)	Special Events Center; El Paso, TX
February 28	No. 5	No. 16 New Mexico	W 65–55	25–2 (12–2)	Jon M. Huntsman Center; Salt Lake City, UT
WAC Tournament
March 5*	(M1) No. 5	vs. (M5) UNLV; Quarterfinals	L 51–54	25–3	Thomas & Mack Center; Las Vegas, NV
NCAA Tournament
March 12*	(3 W) No. 7	vs. (14 W) San Francisco; NCAA tournament first round	W 85–68	26–3	BSU Pavilion; Boise, ID
March 14*	(3 W) No. 7	vs. (6 W) No. 17 Arkansas; NCAA tournament second round	W 75–69	27–3	BSU Pavilion; Boise, ID
March 19*	(3 W) No. 7	vs. (10 W) West Virginia; West Regional semifinal	W 65–62	28–3	Arrowhead Pond of Anaheim; Anaheim, CA
March 21*	(3 W) No. 7	vs. (1 W) No. 4 Arizona; West Regional final	W 76–51	29–3	Arrowhead Pond of Anaheim; Anaheim, CA
March 28*	(3 W) No. 7	vs. (1) No. 1 North Carolina; Final Four	W 65–59	30–3	Alamodome; San Antonio, TX
March 30*; CBS	(3 W) No. 7	vs. (2 S) No. 5 Kentucky; NCAA Championship Game	L 69–78	30–4	Alamodome (40,509); San Antonio, TX
*Non-conference game. ^{#}Rankings from AP Poll. (#) Tournament seedings in parentheses. W=West.

== Team players in the 1998 NBA draft ==
Round	Pick	Player	NBA club
1	12	Michael Doleac	Orlando Magic
