= 1997–98 Alabama Crimson Tide men's basketball team =

American college basketball season

1997–98 Alabama Crimson Tide men's basketball
- Conference: Southeastern Conference
- Record: 15–16 (6–10 SEC)
- Head coach: David Hobbs (6th season)
- Assistant coach: Bob Marlin (3rd season)
- Home arena: Coleman Coliseum

1997–98 Southeastern Conference men's basketball standings
	Conf.				Overall
Team	W		L	PCT	W		L	PCT
East
No. 5 Kentucky †	14	–	2	.875	35	–	4	.897
No. 14 South Carolina	11	–	5	.688	23	–	8	.742
Tennessee	9	–	7	.563	20	–	9	.690
Georgia	7	–	9	.438	20	–	15	.571
Vanderbilt	7	–	9	.438	20	–	13	.606
Florida	6	–	10	.375	14	–	15	.483
West
No. 13 Ole Miss	12	–	4	.750	22	–	7	.759
No. 17 Arkansas	11	–	5	.688	24	–	9	.727
Auburn	7	–	9	.438	16	–	14	.533
Alabama	6	–	10	.375	15	–	16	.484
Mississippi State	4	–	12	.250	15	–	15	.500
LSU	2	–	14	.125	9	–	18	.333
† 1998 SEC tournament winner Rankings from AP Poll

The 1997–98 Alabama Crimson Tide men's basketball team represented the University of Alabama in the 1997–98 NCAA Division I men's basketball season. The team's head coach was David Hobbs, who was in his sixth, and final season at Alabama. The team played their home games at Coleman Coliseum in Tuscaloosa, Alabama. They finished the season with a record of 15–16, with a conference record of 6–10, which placed them in fourth place in the SEC Western Division.

The Tide defeated Vanderbilt in the first round of the 1997 SEC men's basketball tournament, but lost to Kentucky in the quarterfinal. The Tide did not an invite to a postseason tournament, meaning the Tide had missed the postseason for a second consecutive season.

Following the season, head coach David Hobbs resigned from his position, finishing with a 110–76 (59.4%) career record and producing nine All-SEC players. As his replacement, Murray State head coach Mark Gottfried was hired on March 25, 1998.

== Roster ==
1997–98 Alabama Crimson Tide men's basketball team
Players
Coaches

Pos.	#	Name	Height	Weight	Year	Hometown
F	3	Neil Ashby	6 ft 8 in (2.03 m)	—	Fr	Atlanta, Georgia
G	4	Brian Williams	6 ft 1 in (1.85 m)	—	Jr	Montgomery, Alabama
F	5	Tarik London	6 ft 1 in (1.85 m)	200 lb (91 kg)	So
G	15	Blake Thrasher	6 ft 6 in (1.98 m)	—	Jr
G	21	Dejuan Shambley	6 ft 6 in (1.98 m)	—	So
G	22	Chauncey Jones	6 ft 1 in (1.85 m)	—	Jr	Thornton, Colorado
F	24	Alfred Moss	6 ft 8 in (2.03 m)	—	Fr	Newnan, Georgia
F	25	M.C. Mazique	6 ft 10 in (2.08 m)	—	Jr	Brooklyn, New York
G	30	Damon Bacote	6 ft 3 in (1.91 m)	—	Sr	Hampton, Virginia
G	32	Rongie Cowser	6 ft 1 in (1.85 m)	—	Fr	Gadsden, Alabama
F	34	Chris Rollins	6 ft 5 in (1.96 m)	—	Jr
F	35	Demetrius Alexander	6 ft 9 in (2.06 m)	—	Sr	St. Louis, Missouri
C	44	Scott Hamilton	6 ft 8 in (2.03 m)	—	Sr
C	52	Jeremy Hays	6 ft 10 in (2.08 m)	—	So	Boaz, Alabama

Head coach

- David Hobbs

Assistant coach(es)

- Bob Marlin

Legend

- (C) Team captain
- (S) Suspended
- (I) Ineligible
- (W) Walk-on
- Injured
- Current redshirt

== Schedule and results ==
Date time, TV	Rank^{#}	Opponent^{#}	Result	Record	Site city, state
Regular Season
Nov 18, 1997*		North Texas	W 81–61	1–0	Coleman Coliseum; Tuscaloosa, AL
Nov 22, 1997*		at Minnesota	W 64–63	2–0	Williams Arena; Minneapolis, MN
Nov 24, 1997*		Jacksonville State	W 105–72	3–0	Coleman Coliseum; Tuscaloosa, AL
Nov 27, 1997*		vs. Georgia Tech; Puerto Rico Holiday Classic	L 60–62	3–1	Eugene Guerra Sports Complex; San Juan, Puerto Rico
Nov 28, 1997*		vs. American–Puerto Rico; Puerto Rico Holiday Classic	L 79–88	3–2	Caguas Municipal Complex; Caguas, Puerto Rico
Dec 5, 1996*		vs. Wichita State; Puerto Rico Holiday Classic	W 60–58	4–2	Eugene Guerra Sports Complex; San Juan, Puerto Rico
Dec 3, 1997*		Texas A&M	W 81–64	5–2	Coleman Coliseum; Tuscaloosa, AL
Dec 6, 1997*		at Boston University	W 61–53	6–2	Case Gym; Boston, MA
Dec 13, 1997*		FIU	L 66–68	6–3	Coleman Coliseum; Tuscaloosa, AL
Dec 20, 1997*		vs. Tulane; Arby's Holiday Hardwood Classic	L 71–76 ^{OT}	6–4	UAB Arena; Birmingham, AL
Dec 22, 1997*		Alabama State	W 85–61	7–4	Coleman Coliseum; Tuscaloosa, AL
Dec 27, 1997*		vs. Sam Houston State; All–College Tournament	W 77–58	8–4	Myriad Convention Center; Oklahoma City, OK
Dec 28, 1997*		vs. Oklahoma; All–College Tournament	L 61–79	8–5	Myriad Convention Center; Oklahoma City, OK
Jan 3, 1998		Mississippi State	L 52–56	8–6 (0–1)	Coleman Coliseum; Tuscaloosa, AL
Jan 7, 1998		at LSU	W 60–57	9–6 (1–1)	Maravich Assembly Center; Baton Rouge, LA
Jan 10, 1998		No. 14 Ole Miss	L 63–74	9–7 (1–2)	Coleman Coliseum; Tuscaloosa, AL
Jan 14, 1998		Vanderbilt	L 69–72	9–8 (1–3)	Coleman Coliseum; Tuscaloosa, AL
Jan 18, 1998		at Auburn; Iron Bowl of basketball	L 40–94	9–9 (1–4)	Beard-Eaves-Memorial Coliseum; Auburn, AL
Jan 21, 1998; 7:00 p.m., JP Sports		at No. 7 Kentucky	L 67–70	9–10 (1–5)	Freedom Hall; Louisville, KY
Jan 24, 1998		at No. 18 Arkansas	L 70–77	9–11 (1–6)	Bud Walton Arena; Fayetteville, AR
Jan 28, 1998		Tennessee	L 70–84	9–12 (1–7)	Coleman Coliseum; Tuscaloosa, AL
Feb 4, 1998		Auburn; Iron Bowl of basketball	W 76–62	10–12 (2–7)	Coleman Coliseum; Tuscaloosa, AL
Feb 7, 1998		at No. 17 Ole Miss	L 74–75	10–13 (2–8)	Tad Smith Coliseum; Oxford, MS
Feb 11, 1998		at No. 15 South Carolina	L 63–74	10–14 (2–9)	Carolina Coliseum; Columbia, SC
Feb 14, 1998		Florida	W 80–66	11–14 (3–9)	Coleman Coliseum; Tuscaloosa, AL
Feb 18, 1998		at Georgia	L 71–78	11–15 (3–10)	Stegeman Coliseum; Athens, GA
Feb 21, 1998		LSU	W 69–60	12–15 (4–10)	Coleman Coliseum; Tuscaloosa, AL
Feb 25, 1998		at Mississippi State	W 85–70	13–15 (5–10)	Humphrey Coliseum; Starkville, MS
Feb 28, 1998		No. 12 Arkansas	W 65–63	14–15 (6–10)	Coleman Coliseum; Tuscaloosa, AL
SEC Tournament
Mar 5, 1998; JP Sports		vs. Vanderbilt; SEC Tournament First Round	W 72–62	15–15	Georgia Dome; Atlanta, GA
Mar 6, 1998; JP Sports		vs. No. 7 Kentucky; SEC Tournament Quarterfinals	L 71–82	15–16	Georgia Dome; Atlanta, GA
*Non-conference game. ^{#}Rankings from AP Poll. (#) Tournament seedings in parentheses.
