= Scotland, St. Mary's County, Maryland =

Unincorporated community in Maryland, U.S.

Coordinates: 38.094039°N 76.363907°W

Scotland, in St. Mary's County, Maryland, United States, (Us) is a small settlement (unincorporated community) near the southernmost end of the state, on the western shore of the Chesapeake Bay. The ZIP Code for Scotland is 20687. There is a summer camp, operated by the Metropolitan Police Department and the Greater Washington Area Boys and Girls Club.

Located nearby are the town of Ridge and Point Lookout beach, the former site of a Civil War prison camp, now (2018) the Point Lookout Confederate Cemetery and Point Lookout State Park.

== Notable person ==
Scotland is the birthplace and childhood home of Orlando "Tubby" Smith, the men's basketball coach of High Point University and former coach of Tulsa, Georgia, University of Memphis, Texas Tech University, University of Minnesota and the University of Kentucky.
