= 1997–98 Ole Miss Rebels men's basketball team =

American college basketball season

1997–98 Ole Miss Rebels men's basketball

SEC West Division champions

NCAA tournament, first round
- Conference: Southeastern Conference

Ranking
- Coaches: No. 20
- AP: No. 13
- Record: 22–7 (12–4 SEC)
- Head coach: Rob Evans (6th season)
- Home arena: Tad Smith Coliseum

1997–98 Southeastern Conference men's basketball standings
	Conf.				Overall
Team	W		L	PCT	W		L	PCT
East
No. 5 Kentucky †	14	–	2	.875	35	–	4	.897
No. 14 South Carolina	11	–	5	.688	23	–	8	.742
Tennessee	9	–	7	.563	20	–	9	.690
Georgia	7	–	9	.438	20	–	15	.571
Vanderbilt	7	–	9	.438	20	–	13	.606
Florida	6	–	10	.375	14	–	15	.483
West
No. 13 Ole Miss	12	–	4	.750	22	–	7	.759
No. 17 Arkansas	11	–	5	.688	24	–	9	.727
Auburn	7	–	9	.438	16	–	14	.533
Alabama	6	–	10	.375	15	–	16	.484
Mississippi State	4	–	12	.250	15	–	15	.500
LSU	2	–	14	.125	9	–	18	.333
† 1998 SEC tournament winner Rankings from AP Poll

The 1997–98 Ole Miss Rebels men's basketball team represented the University of Mississippi in the 1997–98 NCAA Division I men's basketball season. The Rebels were led by sixth-year head coach, Rob Evans. The Rebels played their home games at Tad Smith Coliseum in Oxford, Mississippi as members of the Southeastern Conference. This season marked the third NCAA Tournament appearance in school history.

The Rebels were SEC West champions and ranked No. 13 in the country by the Associated Press at the time of the 1998 NCAA Tournament. Seeded fourth, Ole Miss's tournament run ended in the first round, 70–69, at the hands of 13-seed Valparaiso. The Rebels were on the receiving end of "The Shot", one of the NCAA tournament's greatest moments.

== Schedule and results ==
Date time, TV	Rank^{#}	Opponent^{#}	Result	Record	Site city, state
Non-conference regular season
November 19, 1997*	No. 21	Louisiana Tech	W 88–56	1–0	Tad Smith Coliseum; Oxford, MS
November 22, 1997*	No. 21	No. 18 Temple	W 87–74	2–0	Tad Smith Coliseum; Oxford, MS
November 24, 1997*	No. 21	Arkansas–Pine Bluff	W 81–36	3–0	Tad Smith Coliseum; Oxford, MS
December 5, 1997*	No. 14	vs. LIU Brooklyn	W 102–99	4–0	Worthen Arena; Muncie, IN
December 6, 1997*	No. 14	at Ball State	L 66–70	4–1	Worthen Arena; Muncie, IN
December 13, 1997*	No. 21	at Wichita State	W 71–48	5–1	Levitt Arena; Wichita, KS
December 17, 1997*	No. 18	Belmont	W 100–59	6–1	Tad Smith Coliseum; Oxford, MS
December 20, 1997*	No. 18	Prairie View A&M	W 106–59	7–1	Tad Smith Coliseum; Oxford, MS
December 22, 1997*	No. 18	at Louisville	W 74–70	8–1	Freedom Hall; Louisville, KY
December 30, 1997*	No. 16	Northwestern State	W 99–52	9–1	Tad Smith Coliseum; Oxford, MS
SEC regular season
January 3, 1998	No. 16	No. 11 South Carolina	W 73–54	10–1 (1–0)	Tad Smith Coliseum; Oxford, MS
January 7, 1998	No. 14	Florida	W 90–79	11–1 (2–0)	Tad Smith Coliseum; Oxford, MS
January 10, 1998	No. 14	at Alabama	W 74–63	12–1 (3–0)	Coleman Coliseum; Tuscaloosa, AL
January 17, 1998	No. 11	at Tennessee	L 67–77	12–2 (3–1)	Thompson–Boling Arena; Knoxville, TN
January 21, 1998	No. 13	LSU	W 80–58	13–2 (4–1)	Tad Smith Coliseum; Oxford, MS
January 24, 1998	No. 13	Mississippi State	W 81–77	14–2 (5–1)	Tad Smith Coliseum; Oxford, MS
January 28, 1998	No. 12	at Georgia	L 68–70	14–3 (5–2)	Stegeman Coliseum; Athens, GA
January 31, 1998	No. 12	at Auburn	L 67–68	14–4 (5–3)	Beard–Eaves–Memorial Coliseum; Auburn, AL
February 5, 1998	No. 17	at No. 14 Arkansas	L 87–100	14–5 (5–4)	Bud Walton Arena; Fayetteville, AR
February 7, 1998	No. 17	Alabama	W 75–74	15–5 (6–4)	Tad Smith Coliseum; Oxford, MS
February 11, 1998	No. 18	Vanderbilt	W 87–76	16–5 (7–4)	Tad Smith Coliseum; Oxford, MS
February 14, 1998; 11:30 a.m., JP Sports	No. 18	at No. 7 Kentucky	W 73–64	17–5 (8–4)	Rupp Arena; Lexington, KY
February 18, 1998	No. 15	at LSU	W 83–57	18–5 (9–4)	Pete Maravich Assembly Center; Baton Rouge, LA
February 21, 1998	No. 15	at Mississippi State	W 82–78	19–5 (10–4)	Humphrey Coliseum; Starkville, MS
February 25, 1998	No. 13	No. 12 Arkansas	W 81–65	20–5 (11–4)	Tad Smith Coliseum; Oxford, MS
February 28, 1998	No. 13	Auburn	W 74–67	21–5 (12–4)	Tad Smith Coliseum; Oxford, MS
SEC tournament
March 6, 1998; JP Sports	(1 W) No. 10	vs. (5 E) Georgia; Quarterfinals	W 72–67	22–5	Georgia Dome; Atlanta, GA
March 7, 1998; JP Sports	(1 W) No. 10	vs. (2 E) No. 15 South Carolina; Semifinals	L 77–87	22–6	Georgia Dome; Atlanta, GA
NCAA tournament
March 13, 1998*; CBS	(4 MW) No. 13	vs. (13 MW) Valparaiso; First round	L 69–70	22–7	Myriad Convention Center; Oklahoma City, OK
*Non-conference game. ^{#}Rankings from AP Poll. (#) Tournament seedings in parentheses. All times are in Central Time.

== Rankings ==
Ranking movements Legend: ██ Increase in ranking ██ Decrease in ranking — = Not ranked
	Week																		
Poll	Pre	1	2	3	4	5	6	7	8	9	10	11	12	13	14	15	16	17	Final
AP	23	21	17	14	21	18	16	16	14	11	13	12	17	18	15	13	10	13	Not released
Coaches	—	—^	18	14	19	18	16	17	14	11	14	12	16	16	14	13	10	14	20

*AP does not release post-NCAA Tournament rankings
^Coaches did not release a week 2 poll

== Awards and honors ==
- Ansu Sesay – SEC Player of the Year, Consensus Second-Team All-American

== 1998 NBA draft ==
Round	Pick	Player	NBA Team
2	30	Ansu Sesay	Dallas Mavericks
