= Jeff Sheppard =

American basketball player (born 1974)

Personal information
- Born: September 29, 1974 (age 52) Marietta, Georgia, U.S.
- Listed height: 6 ft 4 in (1.93 m)
- Listed weight: 189 lb (86 kg)

Career information
- High school: McIntosh (Peachtree City, Georgia)
- College: Kentucky (1993–1998)
- NBA draft: 1998: undrafted
- Playing career: 1998–2001
- Position: Point guard / shooting guard
- Number: 15

Career history
- 1998–1999: Atlanta Hawks
- 1999–2000: Benetton Treviso
- 2000–2001: Cordivari Roseto
- 2001: Würth Roma

Career highlights
- NCAA Final Four Most Outstanding Player (1998); 2× NCAA champion (1996, 1998); Fourth-team Parade All-American (1993); Mr. Georgia Basketball (1992)
- Stats at NBA.com
- Stats at Basketball Reference

Jeffrey Kyle Sheppard (born September 29, 1974) is an American former professional and collegiate basketball player.

== Biography ==
Born in Marietta, Georgia, Sheppard was Player of the Year in Georgia in 1993 at McIntosh High School in Peachtree City.

The 6-foot-3-inch (1.91 m) University of Kentucky guard (1993–1998), was named Most Outstanding Player in the NCAA tournament in San Antonio in 1998. He played on two national championship teams at the University of Kentucky under Rick Pitino in 1996 and under Tubby Smith in 1998.

The success of his college basketball career did not carry over to the professional level. He played briefly in the National Basketball Association with the Atlanta Hawks during the 1998-99 season, averaging 2.2 points and 1.2 rebounds in 18 games. He later played professionally in Italy with Benetton Treviso (1999–00) (won the Italian Cup), Cordivari Roseto (2000–01) and Würth Roma (2001). He played in the preseason games (but not in any regular season games) for the Toronto Raptors in 2000. He cited the September 11 terrorist attacks as being a factor in his decision to retire from basketball.

Sheppard has served as vice president for business development with Wazoo Sports, a regional television sports network concentrating on sports in Kentucky. In 2010, he was involved with a project to restore video and audio of Kentucky's 1958 national championship team.

== Personal life ==
Sheppard and his wife, Stacey (née Reed, herself a former Kentucky basketball player), have two children and live in London, Kentucky. They are involved with various community activities.

He is the father of current Houston Rockets player Reed Sheppard.
