= 1997–98 Auburn Tigers men's basketball team =

American college basketball season

1997–98 Auburn Tigers men's basketball

NIT, Second Round
- Conference: Southeastern Conference
- West
- Record: 16–14 (7–9 SEC)
- Head coach: Cliff Ellis (4th season)
- Captains: Franklin Williams; Doc Robinson
- Home arena: Beard–Eaves–Memorial Coliseum

1997–98 Southeastern Conference men's basketball standings
	Conf.				Overall
Team	W		L	PCT	W		L	PCT
East
No. 5 Kentucky †	14	–	2	.875	35	–	4	.897
No. 14 South Carolina	11	–	5	.688	23	–	8	.742
Tennessee	9	–	7	.563	20	–	9	.690
Georgia	7	–	9	.438	20	–	15	.571
Vanderbilt	7	–	9	.438	20	–	13	.606
Florida	6	–	10	.375	14	–	15	.483
West
No. 13 Ole Miss	12	–	4	.750	22	–	7	.759
No. 17 Arkansas	11	–	5	.688	24	–	9	.727
Auburn	7	–	9	.438	16	–	14	.533
Alabama	6	–	10	.375	15	–	16	.484
Mississippi State	4	–	12	.250	15	–	15	.500
LSU	2	–	14	.125	9	–	18	.333
† 1998 SEC tournament winner Rankings from AP Poll

The 1997–98 Auburn Tigers men's basketball team represented Auburn University in the 1997–98 college basketball season. The team's head coach was Cliff Ellis, who was in his fourth season at Auburn. The team played their home games at Beard–Eaves–Memorial Coliseum in Auburn, Alabama. They finished the season 16–14, 7–9 in SEC play. They lost to Florida in the first round of the SEC tournament. They received an invitation to the National Invitation Tournament, where they defeated Southern Miss to advance to the second round where they lost to Marquette.

== Roster ==
1997–98 Auburn Tigers men's basketball team
Players
Coaches

Pos.	#	Name	Height	Weight	Year	Previous school	Hometown
G	10	Scott Pohlman	6 ft 2 in (1.88 m)	170 lb (77 kg)	Fr	Roswell	Roswell, Georgia
G	13	Bryant Smith	6 ft 5 in (1.96 m)	195 lb (88 kg)	Jr	Butler	Huntsville, Alabama
G	23	Daymeon Fishback	6 ft 5 in (1.96 m)	218 lb (99 kg)	So	Greenwood	Bowling Green, Kentucky
C	34	Mamadou N'Diaye	7 ft 0 in (2.13 m)	245 lb (111 kg)	So	Maine Central Institute	Dakar, Senegal
G	50	Doc Robinson	6 ft 2 in (1.88 m)	185 lb (84 kg)	So	Selma	Selma, Alabama

Head coach

- Cliff Ellis

Assistant coach(es)

Legend

- (C) Team captain
- (S) Suspended
- (I) Ineligible
- (W) Walk-on
- Injured
- Current redshirt

Roster

== Schedule and results ==
Date time, TV	Rank^{#}	Opponent^{#}	Result	Record	High points	High rebounds	High assists	Site (attendance) city, state
Exhibition
November 1, 1997*		Next Level Sports	W 79–63	–	15 – Robinson	12 – N'diaye	4 – Tied	Beard–Eaves–Memorial Coliseum (2,000); Auburn, AL
November 4, 1997*		Marathon	W 78–65	–	14 – N'diaye	11 – N'diaye	4 – Robinson	Beard–Eaves–Memorial Coliseum (1,500); Auburn, AL
Regular season
November 11, 1997*; FSS		vs. No. 24 Temple; NABC Classic	L 42–68	0–1	14 – Pohlman	7 – Tied	4 – Robinson	University Arena (17,112); Albuquerque, NM
November 14, 1997*		at Central Florida	W 70–63	1–1	20 – Pohlman	9 – Hughes	6 – Robinson	UCF Arena (3,814); Orlando, FL
November 17, 1997*		Nicholls State	W 96–75	2–1	18 – Tied	11 – Smith	8 – Robinson	Beard–Eaves–Memorial Coliseum (2,250); Auburn, AL
November 21, 1997*		Southern Miss	W 83–70	3–1	21 – Tied	9 – N'diaye	6 – Robinson	Beard–Eaves–Memorial Coliseum (5,433); Auburn, AL
November 25, 1997*		Wofford	W 68–51	4–1	26 – Smith	13 – Smith	4 – Tied	Beard–Eaves–Memorial Coliseum (1,817); Auburn, AL
December 6, 1997*		Florida A&M	W 79–69	5–1	17 – Robinson	13 – Smith	5 – Robinson	Beard–Eaves–Memorial Coliseum (1,206); Auburn, AL
December 12, 1997*		vs. Pepperdine; Cougar Classic	L 55–62	5–2	14 – Smith	9 – Hughes	7 – Robinson	Marriott Center (1,253); Provo, UT
December 13, 1997*		vs. Weber State; Cougar Classic	W 63–58	6–2	12 – Tied	9 – Tied	4 – Robinson	Marriott Center (1,510); Provo, UT
December 16, 1997*		Jacksonville State	W 89–61	7–2	13 – Hughes	9 – N'diaye	5 – Pohlman	Beard–Eaves–Memorial Coliseum (3,163); Auburn, AL
December 20, 1997*		vs. UAB; Arby's Holiday Hardwood Classic	L 65–71	7–3	25 – Smith	9 – Smith	4 – Robinson	BJCC Coliseum (12,684); Birmingham, AL
December 30, 1997*		Navy	W 70–54	8–3	11 – Tied	9 – Tied	3 – Tied	Beard–Eaves–Memorial Coliseum (4,126); Auburn, AL
January 3, 1998		Georgia	W 73–62	9–3 (1–0)	19 – Tied	11 – Smith	4 – Robinson	Beard–Eaves–Memorial Coliseum (5,641); Auburn, AL
January 7, 1998		at Tennessee	W 74–69	10–3 (2–0)	16 – Smith	10 – Tied	8 – Smith	Thompson–Boling Arena (13,221); Knoxville, TN
January 14, 1997		at LSU	L 54–59	10–4 (2–1)	14 – Robinson	8 – N'diaye	6 – Robinson	Maravich Assembly Center (7,142); Baton Rouge, LA
January 18, 1998; JP Sports		Alabama	W 94–40	11–4 (3–1)	16 – Smith	11 – N'diaye	3 – Tied	Beard–Eaves–Memorial Coliseum (10,108); Auburn, AL
January 21, 1998		No. 18 Arkansas	L 65–79	11–5 (3–2)	20 – Robinson	9 – N'diaye	3 – Tied	Beard–Eaves–Memorial Coliseum (7,238); Auburn, AL
January 24, 1998; JP Sports		No. 14 South Carolina	L 56–61	11–6 (3–3)	20 – Smith	6 – N'diaye	2 – Tied	Beard–Eaves–Memorial Coliseum (6,931); Auburn, AL
January 28, 1998		at Mississippi State	W 69–66 ^{OT}	12–6 (4–3)	16 – Robinson	9 – Tied	4 – Robinson	Humphrey Coliseum (6,734); Starkville, MS
January 31, 1998; FSS		No. 12 Ole Miss	W 68–67	13–6 (5–3)	18 – Robinson	9 – N'diaye	3 – Tied	Beard–Eaves–Memorial Coliseum (6,935); Auburn, AL
February 4, 1998		at Alabama	L 62–76	13–7 (5–4)	21 – Smith	13 – Hughes	4 – Robinson	Coleman Coliseum (9,452); Tuscaloosa, AL
February 7, 1998; JP Sports		Mississippi State	W 68–66 ^{OT}	14–7 (6–4)	15 – Tied	7 – Tied	5 – Robinson	Beard–Eaves–Memorial Coliseum (6,289); Auburn, AL
February 11, 1998; Sun		at Florida	L 64–81	14–8 (6–5)	18 – Robinson	8 – Tied	3 – Tied	O'Connell Center (7,610); Gainesville, FL
February 14, 1998		LSU	W 66–44	15–8 (7–5)	13 – Tied	9 – Robinson	4 – Smith	Beard–Eaves–Memorial Coliseum (6,537); Auburn, AL
February 18, 1998		at Vanderbilt	L 66–82	15–9 (7–6)	14 – Hughes	6 – N'diaye	4 – Robinson	Memorial Gymnasium (14,641); Nashville, TN
February 21, 1998; JP Sports		at No. 16 Arkansas	L 83–107	15–10 (7–7)	24 – Fishback	9 – N'diaye	5 – Robinson	Bud Walton Arena (22,242); Fayetteville, AR
February 25, 1998; JP Sports		No. 7 Kentucky	L 58–83	15–11 (7–8)	15 – Robinson	6 – Smith	5 – Robinson	Beard–Eaves–Memorial Coliseum (9,644); Auburn, AL
February 28, 1998		at No. 13 Ole Miss	L 67–74	15–12 (7–9)	14 – Fishback	9 – N'diaye	5 – Robinson	Tad Smith Coliseum (8,217); Oxford, MS
SEC Tournament
March 5, 1998; JP	(W3)	vs. (E6) Florida; First Round	L 64–68	15–13	18 – Pohlman	10 – N'diaye	5 – Robinson	Georgia Dome (13,855); Atlanta, GA
National Invitational Tournament
March 11, 1998; CBS		Southern Miss; First Round	W 77–62	16–13	19 – N'diaye	12 – Chilliest	6 – Robinson	Beard–Eaves–Memorial Coliseum (5,191); Auburn, AL
March 16, 1998; CBS		at Marquette; Second Round	L 60–75 ^{OT}	16–14	19 – Pohlman	7 – Chilliest	5 – Fishback	Bradley Center (8,692); Milwaukee, WI
*Non-conference game. ^{#}Rankings from AP Poll. (#) Tournament seedings in parentheses. All times are in Central.
