= 1997–98 Tennessee Volunteers basketball team =

American college basketball season

1997–98 Tennessee Volunteers basketball

NCAA tournament, first round
- Conference: Southeastern Conference
- East
- Record: 20–9 (9–7 SEC)
- Head coach: Jerry Green (1st season)
- Home arena: Thompson–Boling Arena

1997–98 Southeastern Conference men's basketball standings
	Conf.				Overall
Team	W		L	PCT	W		L	PCT
East
No. 5 Kentucky †	14	–	2	.875	35	–	4	.897
No. 14 South Carolina	11	–	5	.688	23	–	8	.742
Tennessee	9	–	7	.563	20	–	9	.690
Georgia	7	–	9	.438	20	–	15	.571
Vanderbilt	7	–	9	.438	20	–	13	.606
Florida	6	–	10	.375	14	–	15	.483
West
No. 13 Ole Miss	12	–	4	.750	22	–	7	.759
No. 17 Arkansas	11	–	5	.688	24	–	9	.727
Auburn	7	–	9	.438	16	–	14	.533
Alabama	6	–	10	.375	15	–	16	.484
Mississippi State	4	–	12	.250	15	–	15	.500
LSU	2	–	14	.125	9	–	18	.333
† 1998 SEC tournament winner Rankings from AP Poll

The 1997–98 Tennessee Volunteers basketball team represented the University of Tennessee during the 1997–98 NCAA Division I men's basketball season. The team was led by first-year head coach Jerry Green, and played their home games at Thompson–Boling Arena in Knoxville, Tennessee, as a member of the Southeastern Conference. After finishing third in the SEC East regular season standings with a 9–7 conference record, they were invited to the NCAA tournament as the No. 8 seed in the West region where they lost in the opening round.

== Roster ==
1997–98 Tennessee Volunteers men's basketball team
Players
Coaches

Pos.	#	Name	Height	Weight	Year	Previous school	Hometown
G	15	Brandon Wharton	6 ft 3 in (1.91 m)	—	Jr		Nashville, Tennessee
F	43	C. J. Black	6 ft 8 in (2.03 m)	—	So		Chattanooga, Tennessee
F	44	Isiah Victor	6 ft 9 in (2.06 m)	215 lb (98 kg)	Fr		Hopkinsville, Kentucky
F	55	Charles Hathaway	6 ft 10 in (2.08 m)	—	So	Hillwood	Nashville, Tennessee

Head coach

- Jerry Green

Assistant coach(es)

Legend

- (C) Team captain
- (S) Suspended
- (I) Ineligible
- (W) Walk-on
- Injured
- Current redshirt

Roster

== Schedule and results ==
Date time, TV	Rank^{#}	Opponent^{#}	Result	Record	Site (attendance) city, state
Regular season
Nov 14, 1997*		Winthrop	W 75–62	1–0	Thompson-Boling Arena; Knoxville, Tennessee
Nov 17, 1997*		Miami (OH)	W 75–74	2–0	Thompson-Boling Arena; Knoxville, Tennessee
Nov 19, 1997*		UNC Asheville	W 75–69	3–0	Thompson-Boling Arena; Knoxville, Tennessee
Nov 23, 1997*		Austin Peay	W 74–65	4–0	Thompson-Boling Arena; Knoxville, Tennessee
Nov 28, 1997*		Appalachian State	W 69–46	5–0	Thompson-Boling Arena; Knoxville, Tennessee
Dec 2, 1997*		Tennessee Tech	W 83–69	6–0	Thompson-Boling Arena; Knoxville, Tennessee
Dec 7, 1997*		Wofford	W 92–63	7–0	Thompson-Boling Arena; Knoxville, Tennessee
Dec 9, 1997*		Saint Joseph's	W 74–54	8–0	Thompson-Boling Arena; Knoxville, Tennessee
Dec 20, 1997*		at Memphis	W 68–66	9–0	Pyramid Arena; Memphis, Tennessee
Dec 30, 1997*		at USC	W 74–70	10–0	Los Angeles Memorial Sports Arena; Los Angeles, California
Jan 3, 1998		at Florida	L 69–83	10–1 (0–1)	Stephen C. O'Connell Center; Gainesville, Florida
Jan 7, 1998		Auburn	L 69–74	10–2 (0–2)	Thompson-Boling Arena; Knoxville, Tennessee
Jan 10, 1998		at Vanderbilt	L 79–80	10–3 (0–3)	Memorial Gymnasium; Nashville, Tennessee
Jan 17, 1998		No. 11 Ole Miss	W 77–67	11–3 (1–3)	Thompson-Boling Arena; Knoxville, Tennessee
Jan 21, 1998; 8:00 pm, JPS		at No. 14 South Carolina	L 51–81	11–4 (1–4)	Carolina Coliseum; Columbia, South Carolina
Jan 24, 1998		No. 7 Kentucky	L 67–85	11–5 (1–5)	Thompson-Boling Arena; Knoxville, Tennessee
Jan 28, 1998		at Alabama	W 84–70	12–5 (2–5)	Coleman Coliseum; Tuscaloosa, Alabama
Jan 31, 1998		at LSU	W 72–65	13–5 (3–5)	Maravich Assembly Center; Baton Rouge, Louisiana
Feb 4, 1998		Georgia	W 77–48	14–5 (4–5)	Thompson-Boling Arena; Knoxville, Tennessee
Feb 7, 1998; 2:00 pm, JPS		No. 13 South Carolina	W 70–69	15–5 (5–5)	Thompson-Boling Arena; Knoxville, Tennessee
Feb 11, 1998; 8:00 pm, JPS		at No. 7 Kentucky	L 74–80	15–6 (5–6)	Rupp Arena; Lexington, Kentucky
Feb 14, 1998; 12:30 pm, JPS		No. 12 Arkansas	W 74–71	16–6 (6–6)	Thompson-Boling Arena; Knoxville, Tennessee
Feb 17, 1998		at Mississippi State	W 87–63	17–6 (7–6)	Humphrey Coliseum; Starkville, Mississippi
Feb 21, 1998		Vanderbilt	W 90–76	18–6 (8–6)	Thompson-Boling Arena; Knoxville, Tennessee
Feb 25, 1998		Florida	W 79–75	19–6 (9–6)	Thompson-Boling Arena; Knoxville, Tennessee
Feb 28, 1998; 4:00 pm, JPS		at Georgia	L 72–77	19–7 (9–7)	Stegeman Coliseum; Athens, Georgia
SEC tournament
Mar 5, 1998*; JPS		vs. LSU; First Round	W 73–62	20–7	Georgia Dome; Atlanta, Georgia
Mar 5, 1998*; JPS		vs. Arkansas; Quarterfinals	L 96–102	20–8	Georgia Dome; Atlanta, Georgia
NCAA tournament
Mar 12, 1998*; CBS	(8 W)	vs. (9 W) Illinois State; First Round	L 81–82 ^{OT}	20–9	ARCO Arena (15,284); Sacramento, California
*Non-conference game. ^{#}Rankings from AP poll. (#) Tournament seedings in parentheses. W=West. All times are in Eastern Time.
