= 1997–98 South Carolina Gamecocks men's basketball team =

American college basketball season

1997–98 South Carolina Gamecocks men's basketball

NCAA tournament, First Round
- Conference: Southeastern Conference
- East

Ranking
- Coaches: No. 19
- AP: No. 14
- Record: 23–8 (11–5 SEC)
- Head coach: Eddie Fogler (5th season)
- Assistant coach: Barclay Radebaugh (4th season)
- Home arena: Carolina Coliseum

1997–98 Southeastern Conference men's basketball standings
	Conf.				Overall
Team	W		L	PCT	W		L	PCT
East
No. 5 Kentucky †	14	–	2	.875	35	–	4	.897
No. 14 South Carolina	11	–	5	.688	23	–	8	.742
Tennessee	9	–	7	.563	20	–	9	.690
Georgia	7	–	9	.438	20	–	15	.571
Vanderbilt	7	–	9	.438	20	–	13	.606
Florida	6	–	10	.375	14	–	15	.483
West
No. 13 Ole Miss	12	–	4	.750	22	–	7	.759
No. 17 Arkansas	11	–	5	.688	24	–	9	.727
Auburn	7	–	9	.438	16	–	14	.533
Alabama	6	–	10	.375	15	–	16	.484
Mississippi State	4	–	12	.250	15	–	15	.500
LSU	2	–	14	.125	9	–	18	.333
† 1998 SEC tournament winner Rankings from AP Poll

The 1997–98 South Carolina Gamecocks men's basketball team represented the University of South Carolina as a member of the Southeastern Conference during the 1997–98 men's college basketball season. The team was led by head coach Eddie Fogler and played their home games at Carolina Coliseum in Columbia, South Carolina. The team finished second in the SEC East regular season standings and received an at-large bid to the 1998 NCAA tournament as No. 3 seed in the East region. The Gamecocks lost to 14 seed Richmond in the first round to finish the season with a record of 23–8 (11–5 SEC).

== Roster ==
1996–97 South Carolina Gamecocks men's basketball team
Players	Coaches
Pos. / # / Name / Height / Weight / Year / Hometown; G / 10 / BJ McKie / 6 ft 2 in (1.88 m) / 185 lb (84 kg) / Jr / Irmo, South Carolina	Head coach: Eddie Fogler; Assistant coach(es): Barclay Radebaugh (East Tennessee State); Legend: (C) Team captain; (S) Suspended; (I) Ineligible; (W) Walk-on; Injured; Current redshirt; Roster

== Schedule and results ==
Date time, TV	Rank^{#}	Opponent^{#}	Result	Record	Site city, state
Regular season
Nov 14, 1997*	No. 7	vs. Maryland; Black Coaches Association Classic	W 76–72 ^{OT}	1–0	Target Center; Minneapolis, Minnesota
Nov 21, 1997*	No. 6	The Citadel	W 77–58	2–0	Carolina Coliseum; Columbia, South Carolina
Dec 1, 1997*	No. 5	Belmont	W 72–61	3–0	Carolina Coliseum; Columbia, South Carolina
Dec 5, 1997*	No. 5	vs. Virginia Tech	W 74–73	4–0	Charlotte Coliseum; Charlotte, North Carolina
Dec 6, 1997*	No. 5	vs. Chattanooga	W 67–55	5–0	Charlotte Coliseum; Charlotte, North Carolina
Dec 17, 1997*	No. 6	at Clemson	L 57–62	5–1	Littlejohn Coliseum; Clemson, South Carolina
Dec 20, 1997*	No. 6	Saint Joseph's	W 77–65	6–1	Carolina Coliseum; Columbia, South Carolina
Dec 23, 1997*	No. 10	South Carolina State	W 90–85	7–1	Carolina Coliseum; Columbia, South Carolina
Dec 30, 1997*	No. 11	Towson	W 65–55	8–1	Carolina Coliseum; Columbia, South Carolina
Jan 3, 1998	No. 11	at No. 16 Ole Miss	L 54–73	8–2 (0–1)	Tad Smith Coliseum; Oxford, Mississippi
Jan 7, 1998	No. 16	Vanderbilt	W 71–70	9–2 (1–1)	Carolina Coliseum; Columbia, South Carolina
Jan 10, 1998	No. 16	LSU	W 70–53	10–2 (2–1)	Carolina Coliseum; Columbia, South Carolina
Jan 13, 1998; ESPN	No. 14	at No. 6 Kentucky	L 70–91	10–3 (2–2)	Rupp Arena; Lexington, Kentucky
Jan 18, 1998	No. 14	at Georgia	W 68–60	11–3 (3–2)	Stegeman Coliseum; Athens, Georgia
Jan 21, 1998	No. 14	Tennessee	W 81–51	12–3 (4–2)	Carolina Coliseum; Columbia, South Carolina
Jan 24, 1998	No. 14	at Auburn	W 61–56	13–3 (5–2)	Beard-Eaves-Memorial Coliseum; Auburn, Alabama
Jan 26, 1998*	No. 13	at Furman	W 79–52	14–3	Timmons Arena; Greenville, South Carolina
Jan 28, 1998	No. 13	Florida	W 74–72	15–3 (6–2)	Carolina Coliseum; Columbia, South Carolina
Feb 1, 1998*	No. 13	No. 18 Cincinnati	W 67–65	16–3	Carolina Coliseum; Columbia, South Carolina
Feb 3, 1998	No. 13	at Vanderbilt	W 65–61	17–3 (7–2)	Memorial Gymnasium; Nashville, Tennessee
Feb 7, 1998; JP Sports	No. 13	at Tennessee	L 69–70	17–4 (7–3)	Thompson-Boling Arena; Knoxville, Tennessee
Feb 11, 1998	No. 15	Alabama	W 74–63	18–4 (8–3)	Carolina Coliseum; Columbia, South Carolina
Feb 14, 1998	No. 15	Mississippi State	W 76–65	19–4 (9–3)	Carolina Coliseum; Columbia, South Carolina
Feb 18, 1998	No. 13	at No. 16 Arkansas	L 88–96	19–5 (9–4)	Bud Walton Arena; Fayetteville, Arkansas
Feb 21, 1998	No. 13	at Florida	W 79–74	20–5 (10–4)	Stephen C. O'Connell Center; Gainesville, Florida
Feb 24, 1998	No. 14	Georgia	W 78–76	21–5 (11–4)	Carolina Coliseum; Columbia, South Carolina
Feb 28, 1998	No. 14	No. 7 Kentucky	L 57–69	21–6 (11–5)	Carolina Coliseum; Columbia, South Carolina
SEC Tournament
Mar 6, 1998*; JP Sports	(E2) No. 15	vs. (E6) Florida; Quarterfinals	W 71–60	22–6	Georgia Dome; Atlanta, Georgia
Mar 7, 1998*; JP Sports	(E2) No. 15	vs. (W1) No. 10 Ole Miss; Semifinals	W 87–77	23–6	Georgia Dome; Atlanta, Georgia
Mar 8, 1998*; CBS	(E2) No. 15	vs. (E1) No. 7 Kentucky; Championship Game	L 56–86	23–7	Georgia Dome; Atlanta, Georgia
NCAA Tournament
Mar 12, 1998*; CBS	(3 E) No. 14	vs. (14 E) Richmond; First Round	L 61–62	23–8	Verizon Center; Washington, D.C.
*Non-conference game. ^{#}Rankings from AP Poll. (#) Tournament seedings in parentheses. E=East. All times are in Eastern Time.
