= Arthur Lee (basketball) =

American basketball player (born 1977)

Personal information
- Born: May 27, 1977 (age 49) Los Angeles, California, U.S.
- Listed height: 6 ft 1.25 in (1.86 m)
- Listed weight: 180 lb (82 kg)

Career information
- High school: North Hollywood (Los Angeles, California)
- College: Stanford (1995–1999)
- NBA draft: 1999: undrafted
- Playing career: 1999–2012
- Position: Point guard

Career history
- 1999–2000: Kombassan Konya
- 2000–2001: Cibona Zagreb
- 2001–2002: Basket Rimini Crabs
- 2002–2003: Ironi Nahariya
- 2003–2004: Dinamo Sassari
- 2004: Ironi Nahariya
- 2005–2006: Élan Chalon
- 2006–2007: AEL Larissa
- 2007–2010: ČEZ Nymburk
- 2010–2011: APOEL Nicosia
- 2011–2012: Bejjeh SC
- 2012: Turów Zgorzelec

Career highlights
- All-EuroCup Second Team (2010); First-team All-Pac-10 (1999)

Arthur Lee (born May 27, 1977) is an American former professional basketball player. A 6'1¼", 180 lb. point guard from Stanford University, Lee guided the Stanford Cardinal to the Final Four in 1998. He was undrafted by the NBA, and has played for various basketball clubs throughout Europe since 1999.

== High School and College career ==
Arthur graduated from North Hollywood High School in 1995. He was an All-LA City guard for the Huskies. Lee played college basketball at Stanford University with the Stanford Cardinal from 1995 to 1999. In 2023, he was inducted into the Stanford Athletics Hall of Fame.

== Professional career ==
In his professional career, Lee has played with: Kombassan Konya, Cibona Zagreb, Basket Rimini, Dinamo Sassari, Hapoel Nahariya, ES Chalon sur Saône, AEL Larissa, CEZ Basketball Nymburk and APOEL Nicosia.
