= Heshimu Evans =

American and Portuguese basketball player

Personal information
- Born: May 8, 1975 (age 51)
- Listed height: 6 ft 6 in (1.98 m)
- Listed weight: 234 lb (106 kg)

Career information
- High school: Evander Childs (Bronx, New York); Trinity-Pawling School Post-Graduate (Pawling, New York)
- College: Manhattan (1994–1996); Kentucky (1997–1999)
- NBA draft: 1999: undrafted
- Playing career: 1999–2013
- Position: Small forward

Career history
- 1999: ÉS Chalon-sur-Saône
- 1999–2000: Angers BC
- 2000–2001: Nagoya Diamond Dolphins
- 2001–2002: Illiabum Clube
- 2002: Portugal Telecom
- 2002–2003: Aveiro Basket
- 2003: Ovarense Basquetebol
- 2003–2005: F.C. Porto
- 2005–2006: Ovarense Basquetebol
- 2006: RiverCity Gamblers
- 2006–2007: Basket Zaragoza 2002
- 2007–2008: Baloncesto León
- 2008–2009: Petro Atlético
- 2009–2013: S.L. Benfica

Career highlights
- NCAA champion (1998)

Heshimu Kenyata Evans (born May 8, 1975) is an American-born naturalized Portuguese former basketball player.

== Career ==
Evans, a small forward from Evander Childs High School in The Bronx, went to Trinity-Pawling School as a postgraduate (Pawling, New York) before attending Manhattan College, where he was named Metro Atlantic Athletic Conference (MAAC) rookie of the year in 1995. He followed that up with a first team All-MAAC performance as a sophomore in 1996.

Following his sophomore year, Evans transferred to the University of Kentucky. After sitting out the 1996–97 season as a transfer, he was a key player off the bench for the Wildcats' 1998 NCAA championship team. He averaged 8.8 points and 5.4 rebounds per game. His senior year, he moved into the starting lineup, averaging 11.8 points and 5.4 rebounds per game.

Evans was not selected in the 1999 NBA draft. He signed with ÉS Chalon-sur-Saône in France, kicking off a successful international career. After a stop in Japan, Evans made his way to Portugal in 2001, where he would later become a naturalized citizen. In 2009, Evans joined S.L. Benfica, where he led the team to the LPB championship in 2010. He led the team with 23 points in the series-clinching game.

== Titles ==
=== Benfica ===
- Liga Portuguesa de Basquetebol: 3
  - 2009–10, 2011–12, 2012–13
- Taça da Liga / Hugo dos Santos: 2
  - 2010–11, 2012–13
- Supertaça: 2
  - 2009–10, 2012–13
- António Pratas Trophy: 1
  - 2011–12
- Supertaça Portugal-Angola: 1
  - 2009–10
