= Allen Edwards (basketball) =

American basketball player and coach (born 1975)

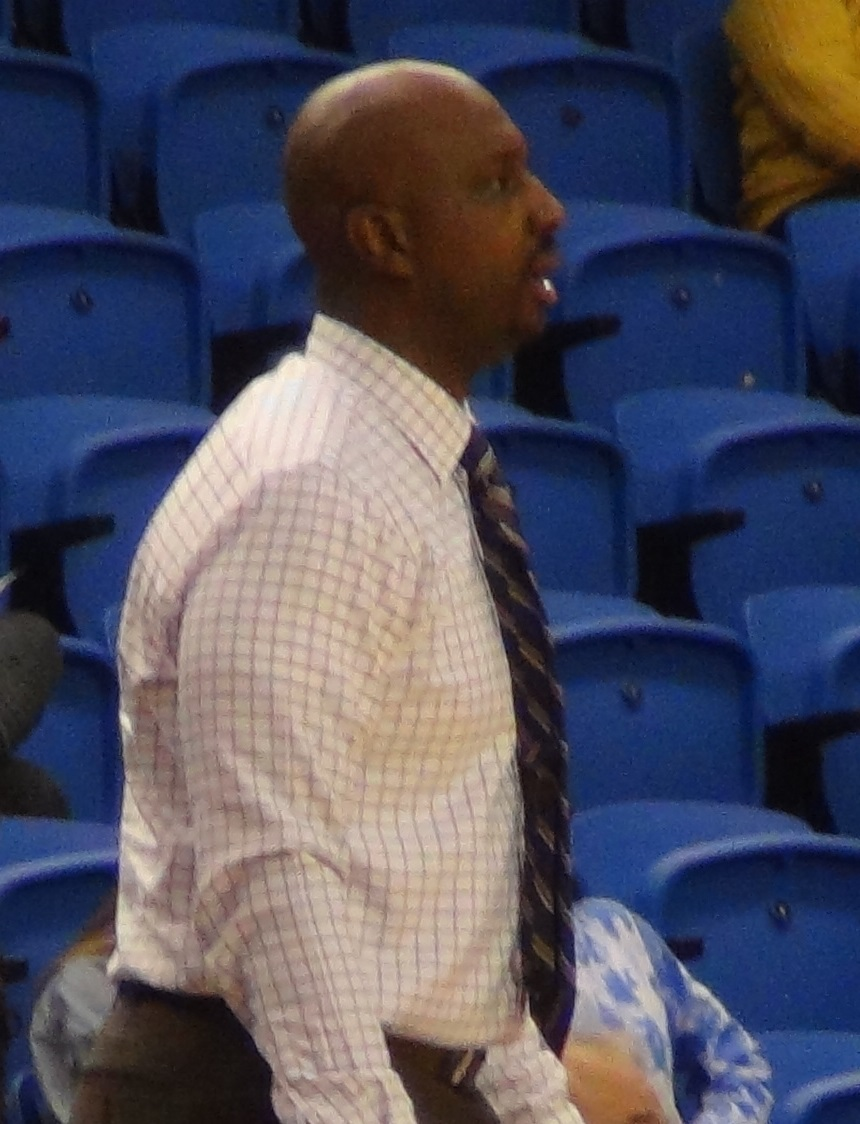
- Edwards in 2020.

Current position
- Title: Assistant Coach
- Team: UMass
- Conference: Atlantic 10 Conference

Biographical details
- Born: December 16, 1975 (age 50); Miami, Florida, U.S.

Playing career
- 1994–1998: Kentucky
- 1998–1999: Rockford Lightning
- 1998–1999: Dakota Wizards
- 1999–2001: Cincinnati Stuff
- Positions: Shooting guard, small forward

Coaching career (HC unless noted)
- 2003–2006: Morehead State (assistant)
- 2006–2009: VCU (assistant)
- 2009–2010: Towson (assistant)
- 2010–2011: Western Kentucky (assistant)
- 2011–2016: Wyoming (assistant)
- 2016–2020: Wyoming
- 2020–2022: Loyola Marymount (assistant)
- 2022–present: UMass (assistant)

Head coaching record
- Overall: 60–76
- Tournaments: 5–1 (CBI)

Accomplishments and honors

Championships
- CBI (2017)

Allen Eugene Edwards (born December 16, 1975) is an American basketball coach and former basketball player. He is best known for winning two NCAA championships at the University of Kentucky as a player. Edwards was formerly the head basketball coach at the University of Wyoming.

== Playing career ==
Edwards, a 6'5" shooting guard from Miami Senior High School in Miami, Florida, went to Kentucky to play for coach Rick Pitino. Edwards played for the Wildcats from 1994 to 1998, a period where the program went 132–16, won three Southeastern Conference (SEC) championships and two national championships. Edwards played a reserve role for the Wildcats on their 1995–96 national title team, averaging 3.3 points per game. With the departure of Tony Delk, Edwards then moved into the starting lineup as a junior, averaging 8.6 points, 3.2 rebounds and 2.9 assists per game. Kentucky again reached the NCAA championship game, but were upset by Arizona. As a senior in 1997–98, Edwards averaged 9.2 points per game and led the Wildacts to their third straight NCAA title game appearance. This time, Kentucky beat Utah to win their second title in three years.

After the conclusion of his college career, Edwards went undrafted in the 1998 NBA draft. He instead went to the Continental Basketball Association, where he played for the Rockford Lightning. He split the 1998–99 season between the Lightning and the Dakota Wizards of the International Basketball Association. He played the next two seasons with the Cincinnati Stuff of the International Basketball League, until the league ceased operations in 2001.

== Coaching career ==
Edwards returned to Kentucky in 2002 to both complete his degree and to serve as an unofficial assistant/manager to his former coach Tubby Smith with the 2002–03 Kentucky Wildcats men's basketball team. He then joined the staff of former Wildcat Kyle Macy at Morehead State as a full-time assistant coach in 2003 and remained for three seasons. From 2006 to 2009, Edwards was an assistant at VCU under Anthony Grant. Edwards then was an assistant at Towson in 2009–10 under Pat Kennedy and Western Kentucky in 2010–11 under Ken McDonald, Edwards was hired to coach Larry Shyatt's staff at Wyoming in 2011. He was announced as the 21st head coach at the University of Wyoming on March 21, 2016. In his first year as head coach, Wyoming went 23–15 and took home the 2017 CBI championship. On March 9, 2020 it was announced that Edwards had been let go as the head basketball coach of the Wyoming Cowboys. Edwards coached the team for four years posting an overall record of 60–76 and a conference record of 24–49. On April 8, 2020, Edwards was announced as a part of Stan Johnson's first coaching staff at Loyola Marymount.

== Personal life ==
Edwards is the younger brother of former NBA player Doug Edwards and of former Miami Hurricanes player Steve Edwards.

== Head coaching record ==
Record table
Season	Team	Overall	Conference	Standing	Postseason
Wyoming Cowboys (Mountain West Conference) (2016–2020)
2016–17	Wyoming	23–15	8–10	7th	CBI Champion
2017–18	Wyoming	20–13	10–8	6th	
2018–19	Wyoming	8–24	4–14	10th	
2019–20	Wyoming	9–24	2–16	11th	
Wyoming:		60–76 (.441)	24–49 (.329)		
Total:		60–76 (.441)			
National champion Postseason invitational champion Conference regular season champion Conference regular season and conference tournament champion Division regular season champion Division regular season and conference tournament champion Conference tournament champion
