= Wayne Turner (basketball) =

American professional basketball player (born 1976)

Personal information
- Born: March 22, 1976 (age 50) Boston, Massachusetts, U.S.
- Listed height: 6 ft 2 in (1.88 m)
- Listed weight: 190 lb (86 kg)

Career information
- High school: Beaver Country Day School (Chestnut Hill, Massachusetts)
- College: Kentucky (1995–1999)
- NBA draft: 1999: undrafted
- Playing career: 1999–2008
- Position: Guard
- Number: 5

Career history
- 1999: Boston Celtics
- 1999–2000: Cincinnati Stuff
- 2000: Harlem Globetrotters
- 2001: Andrea Costa Imola
- 2002: Dakota Wizards
- 2002–2003: Townsville Crocodiles
- 2005: Dakota Wizards
- 2005–2006: Spirou Basket
- 2006: Boston Frenzy
- 2007–2008: New Zealand Breakers
- 2008: East Kentucky Miners

Career highlights
- CBA champion (2002); All-NBL Third Team (2003); 2× NCAA champion (1996, 1998); First-team Parade All-American (1995); McDonald's All-American (1995)
- Stats at NBA.com
- Stats at Basketball Reference

Wayne Keon Turner (born March 22, 1976) is a retired American professional basketball player. He played high school basketball at Beaver Country Day School in Brookline, Massachusetts. As a star point guard for the Kentucky Wildcats during a four-year period in which they won two national titles (1996 and 1998) and lost in the championship game once (1997). He set the NCAA record for games played (which has since been broken) with 151 games in his four-year Kentucky Wildcats career.

During his college career he appeared twice on the cover of Sports Illustrated magazine. Following his college years he played for the NBA's Boston Celtics and the International Basketball League's Cincinnati Stuff. In 2000, he signed with the Harlem Globetrotters. In 2002, he played for the Dakota Wizards of the Continental Basketball Association and helped the team win the 2002 CBA Championship. Turner rejoined the Wizards in 2005, helping them reach the play-offs. In 2008, he returned to the CBA as a member of the East Kentucky Miners.

Turner also played as an import (non-local) in the Italian team Andrea Costa Imola (September to December 2001), and in the Australasian National Basketball League for the Townsville Crocodiles (2002–03), before his contract was terminated following charges laid in the U.S. after police found an illegally possessed 9mm handgun, loaded with 12 rounds, in his rental car. Turner said the case was eventually dismissed in 2005. He also signed a one-year deal (2007–08) with the NBL's New Zealand Breakers.

In September 2010, he returned to the University of Kentucky to finish his undergraduate degree, and joined the men's basketball staff at his alma mater. Turner was also the Director of Player Development for the men's basketball team at the University of Louisville, working under his former coach Rick Pitino and briefly under David Padgett.

== In literature ==
Wayne Turner is mentioned in Frank X Walker's poem "Death by Basketball," found in his volume of poetry, Affrilachia.

== See also ==
- List of NCAA Division I men's basketball players with 145 games played
