= Tubby Smith =

American basketball coach (born 1951)

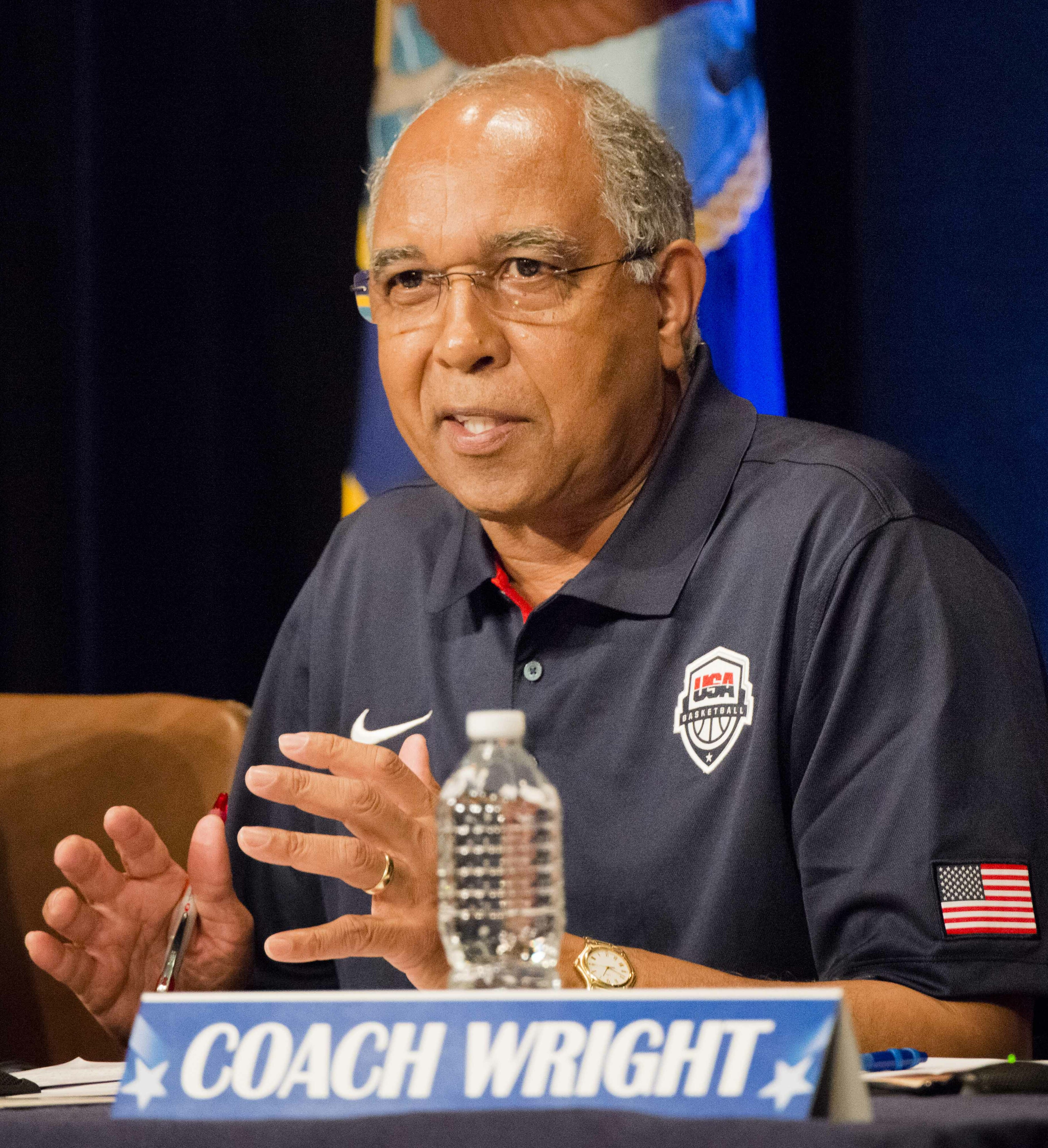
- Smith in 2014

Biographical details
- Born: June 30, 1951 (age 75); Scotland, Maryland, U.S.

Playing career
- 1969–1973: High Point

Coaching career (HC unless noted)
- 1973–1977: Great Mills HS
- 1977–1979: Hoke County HS
- 1979–1986: VCU (assistant)
- 1986–1989: South Carolina (assistant)
- 1989–1991: Kentucky (assistant)
- 1991–1995: Tulsa
- 1995–1997: Georgia
- 1997–2007: Kentucky
- 2007–2013: Minnesota
- 2013–2016: Texas Tech
- 2016–2018: Memphis
- 2018–2022: High Point

Head coaching record
- Overall: 642–369 (college)

Accomplishments and honors

Championships
- NCAA Division I tournament (1998); NCAA Division I Regional – Final Four (1998); 5 SEC regular season (1998, 2000, 2001, 2003, 2005); 5 SEC tournament (1998, 1999, 2001, 2003, 2004); 2 MVC regular season (1994, 1995)

Awards
- AP College Coach of the Year (2003); Naismith College Coach of the Year (2003); NABC Coach of the Year (2003); Henry Iba Award (2003); Jim Phelan Award (2005); 2× MVC Coach of the Year (1994, 1995); 3× SEC Coach of the Year (1998, 2003, 2005); Big 12 Coach of the Year (2016); John R. Wooden Legends of Coaching Award (2016); Sporting News National Coach of the Year (2016)
- College Basketball Hall of Fame; Inducted in 2026
Medal record
Men's basketball
Assistant coach for United States
Olympic Games
Gold medal – first place	2000 Sydney	Team

Orlando Henry "Tubby" Smith (born June 30, 1951) is an American college basketball coach who last coached the men's basketball team at High Point University, his alma mater. Smith previously served in the same role at the University of Tulsa, the University of Georgia, the University of Kentucky, the University of Minnesota, Texas Tech University, and the University of Memphis. With Kentucky, he coached the Wildcats to the 1998 NCAA championship.

In his 31 years as a head coach, Smith achieved 26 winning seasons. In 2005, he joined Roy Williams, Nolan Richardson, Denny Crum, and Jim Boeheim as the only head coaches to win 365 games in 15 seasons or fewer. With Texas Tech's invitation to the 2016 NCAA tournament, Smith became only the second of three coaches in history to lead five different teams to the NCAA tournament.

Smith has three sons. G.G. Smith, who played for his father at the University of Georgia, was formerly the head coach at Loyola (Md), and also formerly head coach at High Point. His middle son Saul Smith played for his father at the University of Kentucky and was an assistant coach for his father at Memphis. Brian, his youngest son, was a point guard at Ole Miss and is the head coach at Saint John Paul II Academy in Boca Raton, Florida.

== Early years ==
Smith was born in Scotland, Maryland, in Saint Mary's County, the sixth of 17 children born to sharecroppers Guffrie and Parthenia Smith. His large family accounts for his unusual nickname. Of all the Smith children, Tubby was most fond of staying in the galvanized washtub where the children were bathed. Smith says it stuck despite repeatedly trying to shake it. He recalls that a 10th-grade teacher who didn't tolerate nicknames was the last person to call him by his given name, Orlando.

After having a scholarship offer from the University of Maryland rescinded, Smith enrolled at High Point College (now High Point University), graduating in 1973. He played under three head coaches at High Point, including future boss J. D. Barnett. He lettered four times and was an all-conference performer as a senior. Smith earned a Bachelor of Science degree in health and physical education while at High Point, and also met his future wife, Donna, who was the homecoming queen.

In 1973, Smith began his coaching career with four years at his high school alma mater – Great Mills High School in Great Mills, Maryland, compiling a 46–36 record. His next stop was Hoke County High School in Raeford, North Carolina, where he recorded a 28–18 mark in two seasons.

== Assistant coaching positions ==
=== VCU ===
Smith began as assistant coach at Virginia Commonwealth University under his former High Point coach J. D. Barnett. From 1979 to 1986, VCU amassed a 144–64 record, winning three Sun Belt Conference Championships.

Smith took two important things away from his experience as an assistant coach for the Rams. First, under Barnett, Smith learned the principles of the ball-line defense, a hallmark of Smith's teams throughout his head coaching career. Second was a relationship with fellow assistant David Hobbs, an assistant and associate head coach under Smith during his tenure at the University of Kentucky.

=== South Carolina ===
Smith left Virginia Commonwealth in 1986 to join George Felton's staff at the University of South Carolina. Felton remembered Smith from having recruited one of his players while Smith was at Hoke High School. During Smith's three years, the Gamecocks were 53–35. Later, roles would be reversed, with Smith bringing Felton in as an assistant coach at Kentucky.

=== Kentucky ===
Smith joined the University of Kentucky under then head coach Rick Pitino, who had the challenge of rebuilding a UK program that had been rocked by NCAA probation and player defections.

With only eight scholarship student-athletes, none taller than 6–7, the staff molded the Cats into winners once again, exceeding expectations to record a 14–14 mark. The following year, with Smith promoted to associate coach and UK still on probation, the Wildcats earned a 22–6 record, a final ranking of ninth in the AP poll, and an SEC-best 14–4 record.

Smith was one of several future head coaches on Rick Pitino's coaching staff at Kentucky, alongside Ralph Willard, Herb Sendek, Billy Donovan, and Bernadette Locke-Mattox.

== Head coaching career ==
=== Tulsa ===
From 1991 to 1995, Smith led the Tulsa Golden Hurricane men's basketball to a 79–43 record. Rebuilding the basketball program his first two years, he then led the team to two consecutive Missouri Valley Conference regular season titles and two appearances in the Sweet 16 of the NCAA Division I men's basketball tournament in 1994 and 1995. Smith's 1994 Tulsa team upset UCLA in the tourney's first round before knocking off Oklahoma State. In '95, the Golden Hurricane defeated Big Ten team Illinois to open March Madness.

=== Georgia ===
On March 29, 1995, Smith accepted the head coaching job at the University of Georgia, becoming the school's first African-American head coach. In two seasons, he led the Bulldogs to a 45–19 record, including the first back-to-back seasons of 20 wins or more in school history. His teams achieved a Sweet 16 finish in the 1996 NCAA tournament and lost in the first round of the 1997 NCAA tournament. The Bulldogs defeated Clemson to open the '96 tournament before upsetting the top-seeded Purdue Boilermakers.

=== Kentucky ===
Smith was introduced as the Wildcats' 10th head coach on May 12, 1997, charged with the task of replacing popular coach Rick Pitino, who left to become the head coach of the NBA's Boston Celtics. The Wildcats were at the top of the basketball world at the time, having won a national title in 1996 and played in the national title game in 1997. The team Smith inherited had seven players from the Arizona loss and five from the 1996 championship team.

In his first season at UK, Smith coached the Wildcats to their seventh NCAA Men's Division I Basketball Championship, including a come-from-behind victory against Duke in the Elite Eight. His 1998 national championship is unique in modern times, as being the only team in over twenty years to win without a first-team All-American or future NBA lottery pick. (see 1998 NCAA tournament).

Smith's teams, known primarily for a defense-oriented slower style of play coined "Tubbyball", received mixed reviews among Kentucky fans who have historically enjoyed a faster, higher-scoring style of play under previous coaches. Smith was also known for using the ball line defense.

Smith led Kentucky to one national championship in 1998, a perfect 16–0 regular season conference record in 2003, five SEC regular season championships (1998, 2000, 2001, 2003, 2005) and five SEC Tournament titles (1998, 1999, 2001, 2003, 2004). Smith led the Wildcats to six Sweet Sixteen appearances (1998, 1999, 2001, 2002, 2003, 2005) and four Elite Eight appearances (1998, 1999, 2003, 2005) in his ten seasons. He totaled 100 wins quicker than any other Wildcat coach except Hall of Fame member Adolph Rupp and former Wildcat coach John Calipari, reaching the plateau in 130 games. Smith was named National Coach of the Year in 2003 and SEC Coach of the Year in 1998, 2003, and 2005.

Smith came under considerable pressure from many UK fans late in his tenure. Many thought that his recruiting was subpar, as he regularly struggled to land top recruits. Kentucky fans also became impatient that his teams never reached another Final Four during his tenure. Some UK fans went as far as to place "for sale" signs on his front lawn. Smith did come just a double overtime loss short of a Final Four appearance in 2005, losing to Tom Izzo's Michigan State Spartans. Smith's Kentucky teams also lost in the regional finals of both the 1999 and 2003 NCAA tournaments. Smith also had five double digit loss seasons (which led to his critics nicknaming him "Ten-Loss Tubby"), which caused the pressure to ramp up on him. On March 22, 2007, Smith resigned his position of UK head coach to accept the head coach position at the University of Minnesota.

In his ten seasons at Kentucky, Smith led UK to an overall record of 263–83, for a winning percentage of .760. In contrast, the coach Kentucky selected to succeed him, Billy Gillispie, went 40–27 for a winning percentage of .597, and missed the NCAAs in his second year.

In 2013, Smith was elected to the UK Athletic Hall of Fame.

=== Minnesota ===
Smith was hired as the new men's head coach of the University of Minnesota on March 22, 2007. He replaced Dan Monson, who resigned from Minnesota on November 30, 2006, and Jim Molinari, who served as the interim coach following Monson's resignation. Coach Smith joined Minnesota on the heels of several disappointing seasons for the Gophers, who had made the NCAA Tournament only once since Monson's hiring in 1999.

In Smith's first season, the team improved from 8–22 in 2006–07 to 20–14 in 2007–08, and reached the Big Ten tournament semifinals after defeating second-seeded Indiana. In the 2008–09 season, Smith led Minnesota to a record of 22–11 and a bid to the NCAA tournament, where the team was eliminated in the opening round. In the 2009–10 season, Smith's team struggled throughout the year with off court issues and close losses. However, in the Big Ten tournament, Smith guided the team to win three games in three days to advance to Minnesota's first ever appearance in the Big Ten championship game. Though it lost that game, the team's run vaulted it into the NCAA tournament for the second consecutive year, where it again lost in the first round.

In 2008, Smith had the highest salary of any state employee in Minnesota.

The 2010–11 Gophers struggled to maintain the program's momentum, however, finishing 17–14 overall and 6–12 in league play (9th place). Following the season, Smith cited injuries as a major factor for the team's disappointing season. The 2011–12 Gophers were 19–14 overall and 6–12 in conference play at the conclusion of the regular season. After earning a bid to play in the NIT, the Gophers won four consecutive games before losing in the NIT championship game to Stanford. They concluded the season with a 23–15 overall record, which tied for the most wins in a season in school history.

In July 2012, Smith signed a three-year extension with Minnesota. However, on March 25, 2013, Smith was relieved of his head coaching duties following a Round of 32 loss in the NCAA Tournament to Florida. He was replaced by Richard Pitino, whose father Rick had been replaced, coincidentally, by Smith at Kentucky.

=== Texas Tech ===
On April 1, 2013, Texas Tech announced that Smith would be hired, and he was introduced as the new men's basketball coach on April 2, 2013. He replaced Billy Gillispie (who ironically replaced Smith after he left Kentucky in 2007), who resigned from Texas Tech on September 20, 2012, and Chris Walker, who served as the interim coach following Gillispie's resignation. Texas Tech had failed to make the NCAA tournament in the 7 years prior to Smith's hire at the school.

Tubby Smith's first season (2013–2014) proved to be a challenge. The Red Raiders led by Jaye Crockett started the season 8–5 in non conference only to fade during Big 12 play finishing with a 6–12 conference mark. Although the team faded down the stretch, it showed that it could compete with the upper teams in the Big 12 as the Red Raiders won two games against ranked competition and lost many close games. The team finished with a 14–18 record overall and 9th in the 10 team Big 12. This season marked Smith's first losing season as a head coach in his career and proved that the rebuilding job in Lubbock was massive.

Smith's second season started with Smith attempting to improve the Red Raiders talent level. Smith added Keenan Evans, Justin Gray, Norense Odiase, and Zach Smith in the offseason in the hopes of improving a depleted Red Raider team. The season ended up being a massive disappointment as the Red Raiders got worse than the 2013–2014 season and finished 13–19 with only 3 victories coming in the Big 12. Although, the season was labeled a massive disappointment, Smith led the Red Raiders to their first victory over a top 25 team since the 2009 season with a January 15, 2014 upset over the #9 Iowa State Cyclones. Although the season started with plenty of promise, the Red Raiders finished a poor season with a first round Big 12 tournament exit against the Texas Longhorns.

The 2015–16 season proved to be Smith's best, his 3rd season at Texas Tech, the Red Raiders started the season with a 12–7 record and a 2–6 record in the Big 12. The Red Raiders eventually led a turnaround and won 3 straight games against ranked opponents for the first time in school history. The season featured young stars Evans, Gray, Odiase, and Smith as well as senior leaders Devaugntah Williams and Toddrick Gotcher. The team proved to be well balanced and efficient on both sides of the ball. The Red Raiders made good use of Smith's ball line defense. The Red Raiders would close out the 2015–16 regular season by winning 6 of their last 8 games and finishing with an overall 19–12 record with a 9–9 record in Big 12 play. The turnaround was the biggest in the Big 12 with the Red Raiders completing a six-game improvement from the year prior in arguably the toughest conference in the country. On March 13, 2016, the Red Raiders were selected to participate in the 2016 NCAA tournament. Smith was named the Big 12 Coach of the Year for orchestrating the turnaround. On March 8, Smith was named as the Sporting News Coach of the Year for his rebuilding effort.

=== Memphis ===
On April 14, 2016, Smith accepted the head coaching position at Memphis, replacing former Memphis coach Josh Pastner who took the job at Georgia Tech. In April 2017 six of the top eight scorers transferred out of the program. Smith compiled a 21–13 record in his second year at Memphis, improving upon a 19–13 record in his first year. After failing to earn a postseason berth in either season, he was fired from the position on March 14, 2018.

=== High Point ===
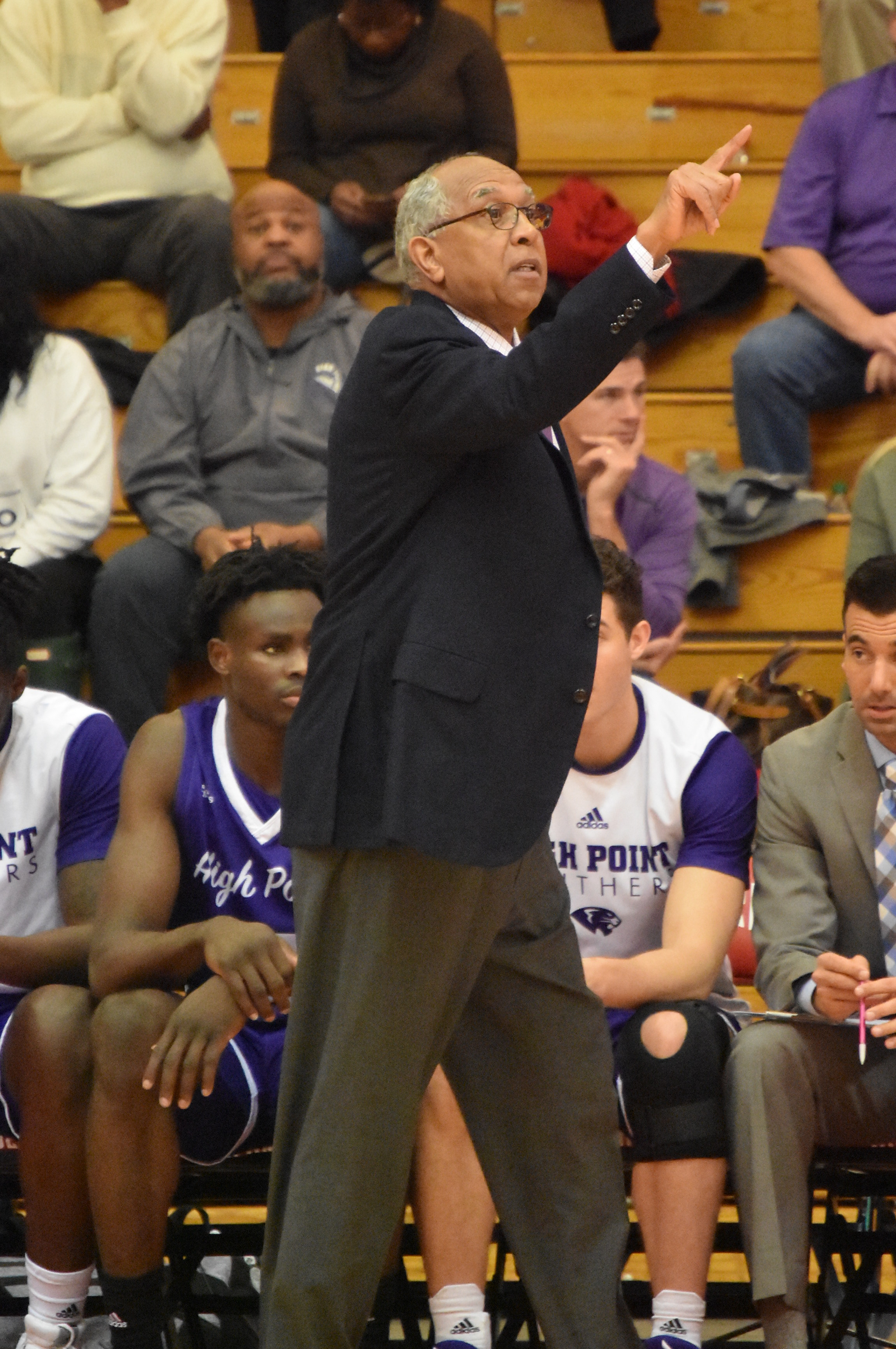
Tubby Smith coaching High Point

On March 25, 2018, it was first reported by Jeff Goodman of ESPN that Smith was on the verge of finalizing a contract to become the next head coach at his alma mater, High Point University. He was officially named head coach on March 27, 2018. Smith is an active donor at HPU, contributing to the funding of a new arena. On February 16, 2022, he resigned as head coach and was succeeded by his son, G. G. Smith.

== National team career ==
Smith was selected to help coach the United States men's national basketball team at the 2000 Summer Olympics in Sydney. He served as an assistant to then-Houston Rockets coach Rudy Tomjanovich as the Americans captured the gold medal.

== Other leadership ==
Smith was inducted into Omicron Delta Kappa - The National Leadership Honor Society in 2001 at the University of Kentucky.

Smith serves on the NCAA Committee to study basketball issues, joining Duke's Mike Krzyzewski and former Oregon head coach Ernie Kent. He also serves on the National Association of Basketball Coaches Board of Directors and in June 2000, spoke at a Congressional hearing on the issue of gambling in college sports.

Smith and his wife, Donna, gave $1 million to High Point University, their alma mater, for the building of a new basketball arena and conference center. High Point University announced in February 2017 that it will name the basketball court in their honor.

== Personal life ==
When he coached at Kentucky, Smith was active in the Lexington community. The Tubby Smith Foundation, which he established to assist underprivileged children, raised more than $1.5 million in five years. Smith and his wife, Donna, are still active with The TSF in Lexington even though they no longer live in the area. Also, several community centers in the greater Lexington area bear the moniker "Tubby's Klubhouse" due to his work within the centers.

== Head coaching record ==
=== College ===
Record table
Season	Team	Overall	Conference	Standing	Postseason
Tulsa Golden Hurricane (Missouri Valley Conference) (1991–1995)
1991–92	Tulsa	17–13	12–6	T–4th	
1992–93	Tulsa	15–14	10–8	4th	
1993–94	Tulsa	23–8	15–3	1st	NCAA Division I Sweet 16
1994–95	Tulsa	24–8	15–3	1st	NCAA Division I Sweet 16
Tulsa:		79–43 (.648)	52–20 (.722)		
Georgia Bulldogs (Southeastern Conference) (1995–1997)
1995–96	Georgia	21–10	9–7	T–3rd	NCAA Division I Sweet 16
1996–97	Georgia	24–9	10–6	4th	NCAA Division I Round of 64
Georgia:		45–19 (.703)	19–13 (.594)		
Kentucky Wildcats (Southeastern Conference) (1997–2007)
1997–98	Kentucky	35–4	14–2	1st	NCAA Division I champion
1998–99	Kentucky	28–9	11–5	3rd	NCAA Division I Elite Eight
1999–00	Kentucky	23–10	12–4	T–1st	NCAA Division I Round of 32
2000–01	Kentucky	24–10	12–4	T–1st	NCAA Division I Sweet 16
2001–02	Kentucky	22–10	10–6	T–2nd	NCAA Division I Sweet 16
2002–03	Kentucky	32–4	16–0	1st	NCAA Division I Elite Eight
2003–04	Kentucky	27–5	13–3	2nd	NCAA Division I Round of 32
2004–05	Kentucky	28–6	14–2	1st	NCAA Division I Elite Eight
2005–06	Kentucky	22–13	9–7	6th	NCAA Division I Round of 32
2006–07	Kentucky	22–12	9–7	4th	NCAA Division I Round of 32
Kentucky:		263–83 (.760)	120–40 (.750)		
Minnesota Golden Gophers (Big Ten Conference) (2007–2013)
2007–08	Minnesota	20–14	8–10	6th	NIT first round
2008–09	Minnesota	22–11	9–9	T–7th	NCAA Division I Round of 64
2009–10	Minnesota	21–14	9–9	6th	NCAA Division I Round of 64
2010–11	Minnesota	17–14	6–12	9th	
2011–12	Minnesota	23–15	6–12	T–9th	NIT Runner-up
2012–13	Minnesota	21–13	8–10	T–7th	NCAA Division I Round of 32
Minnesota:		124–81 (.605)	46–62 (.426)		
Texas Tech Red Raiders (Big 12 Conference) (2013–2016)
2013–14	Texas Tech	14–18	6–12	9th	
2014–15	Texas Tech	13–19	3–15	10th	
2015–16	Texas Tech	19–13	9–9	7th	NCAA Division I Round of 64
Texas Tech:		46–50 (.479)	18–36 (.333)		
Memphis Tigers (American Athletic Conference) (2016–2018)
2016–17	Memphis	19–13	9–9	T–5th	
2017–18	Memphis	21–13	10–8	5th	
Memphis:		40–26 (.606)	19–17 (.528)		
High Point Panthers (Big South Conference) (2018–2022)
2018–19	High Point	16–15	9–7	T–5th	
2019–20	High Point	9–23	6–12	T–10th	
2020–21	High Point	9–15	6–11	8th	
2021–22	High Point	11–14	5–6		
High Point:		45–67 (.402)	26–36 (.419)		
Total:		642–369 (.635)			
National champion Postseason invitational champion Conference regular season champion Conference regular season and conference tournament champion Division regular season champion Division regular season and conference tournament champion Conference tournament champion

== See also ==
- List of college men's basketball coaches with 600 wins
- List of NCAA Division I Men's Final Four appearances by coach
