= 1998 ACC men's basketball tournament =

- Classification: Division I
- Season: 1997–98
- Teams: 9
- Site: Greensboro, North Carolina; Greensboro Coliseum
- Champions: North Carolina (15th title)
- Winning coach: Bill Guthridge (1st title)
- MVP: Antawn Jamison (North Carolina)

1997–98 ACC men's basketball standings
	Conf.				Overall
Team	W		L	PCT	W		L	PCT
No. 3 Duke	15	–	1	.938	32	–	4	.889
No. 1 North Carolina†	13	–	3	.813	34	–	4	.895
No. 20 Maryland	10	–	6	.625	21	–	11	.656
Wake Forest	7	–	9	.438	16	–	14	.533
Clemson	7	–	9	.438	18	–	14	.563
Georgia Tech	6	–	10	.375	19	–	14	.576
Florida State	6	–	10	.375	18	–	4	.818
NC State	5	–	11	.313	17	–	15	.531
Virginia	3	–	13	.188	11	–	19	.367
† 1998 ACC tournament winner Rankings from AP poll

The 1998 Atlantic Coast Conference men's basketball tournament took place from March 5 to 8 in Greensboro, North Carolina, at the Greensboro Coliseum. North Carolina won the tournament for the second year in a row, defeating Duke in the championship game.

From 1998 to 2000, the ACC Tournament adopted a format that in which the top-seeded team played the last-place team in the first round. The winner of this game received a bye into the semifinals. A second first-round game pitted the #7 seed versus the #8 seed. The winner of that game played the #2 seed in the quarterfinals.

Antawn Jamison of North Carolina was named tournament MVP.

== Bracket ==
First round March 5
1	#1 Duke	63
9	Virginia	41
7	Florida State	63
8	NC State	65

Quarterfinals; March 6
1	#1 Duke
(bye)
4	Wake Forest	56
5	Clemson	75
2	#4 North Carolina	73
8	NC State	46
3	#21 Maryland	83
6	Georgia Tech	65

Semifinals; March 7
1	#1 Duke	66
5	Clemson	64
2	#4 North Carolina	83^{OT}
3	#21 Maryland	73

Championship Game; March 8
1	#1 Duke	68
2	#4 North Carolina	83

AP rankings at time of tournament

== Awards and honors ==
=== Everett Case Award ===
Player	School
Antawn Jamison	North Carolina

=== All Tournament Teams ===
==== First Team ====
Player	School
Antawn Jamison	North Carolina
Trajan Langdon	Duke
Terrell McIntyre	Clemson
Roshown McLeod	Duke
Shammond Williams	North Carolina

==== Second Team ====
Player	School
Chris Carrawell	Duke
Vince Carter	North Carolina
Ed Cota	North Carolina
Rodney Elliott	Maryland
Ademola Okulaja	North Carolina
