= Georgia Tech Yellow Jackets men's basketball statistical leaders =

The Georgia Tech Yellow Jackets men's basketball statistical leaders are individual statistical leaders of the Georgia Tech Yellow Jackets men's basketball program in various categories, including points, rebounds, assists, steals, and blocks. Within those areas, the lists identify single-game, single-season, and career leaders. The Yellow Jackets represent the Georgia Institute of Technology in the NCAA's Atlantic Coast Conference.

Georgia Tech began competing in intercollegiate basketball in 1905. However, the school's record book does not generally list records from before the 1950s, as records from before this period are often incomplete and inconsistent. Since scoring was much lower in this era, and teams played much fewer games during a typical season, it is likely that few or no players from this era would appear on these lists anyway.

The NCAA did not officially record assists as a stat until the 1983–84 season, and blocks and steals until the 1985–86 season, but Georgia Tech's record books includes players in these stats before these seasons. These lists are updated through the end of the 2020–21 season.

== Scoring ==
Career
Rank	Player	Points	Seasons
1	Rich Yunkus	2,232	1968–69 1969–70 1970–71
2	Matt Harpring	2,225	1994–95 1995–96 1996–97 1997–98
3	Mark Price	2,193	1982–83 1983–84 1984–85 1985–86
4	Dennis Scott	2,115	1987–88 1988–89 1989–90
5	Tom Hammonds	2,081	1985–86 1986–87 1987–88 1988–89
6	Travis Best	2,057	1991–92 1992–93 1993–94 1994–95
7	James Forrest	1,978	1991–92 1992–93 1993–94 1994–95
8	Brian Oliver	1,848	1986–87 1987–88 1988–89 1989–90
9	Duane Ferrell	1,818	1984–85 1985–86 1986–87 1987–88
10	Malcolm Mackey	1,736	1989–90 1990–91 1991–92 1992–93

Season
Rank	Player	Points	Season
1	Dennis Scott	970	1989–90
2	Rich Yunkus	815	1970–71
3	Rich Yunkus	814	1969–70
4	Kenny Anderson	776	1990–91
5	Brian Oliver	724	1989–90
6	Kenny Anderson	721	1989–90
7	Matt Harpring	691	1997–98
8	Stephon Marbury	679	1995–96
9	Matt Harpring	670	1995–96
10	Dennis Scott	649	1988–89

Single game
Rank	Player	Points	Season	Opponent
1	Kenny Anderson	50	1990–91	Loyola Marymount
2	Rich Yunkus	47	1969–70	Furman
	Rich Yunkus	47	1969–70	North Carolina
4	Dennis Scott	42	1989–90	Pittsburgh
	Kenny Anderson	42	1990–91	Howard
6	Rich Yunkus	41	1968–69	Tulane
	Rich Yunkus	41	1969–70	Florida State
	Kenny Anderson	41	1990–91	Villanova
9	Pres Judy	40	1966–67	Florida State
	Rich Yunkus	40	1969–70	Georgia State
	Rich Yunkus	40	1970–71	Georgia
	Tom Hammonds	40	1988–89	Georgia State
	Dennis Scott	40	1989–90	Minnesota
	Kenny Anderson	40	1990–91	Georgia

== Rebounds ==
Career
Rank	Player	Rebounds	Seasons
1	Malcolm Mackey	1,205	1989–90 1990–91 1991–92 1992–93
2	Alvin Jones	1,075	1997–98 1998–99 1999–00 2000–01
3	Matt Harpring	997	1994–95 1995–96 1996–97 1997–98
4	Jim Caldwell	993	1962–63 1963–64 1964–65
5	Rich Yunkus	955	1968–69 1969–70 1970–71
6	Tom Hammonds	885	1985–86 1986–87 1987–88 1988–89
7	James Forrest	846	1991–92 1992–93 1993–94 1994–95
8	Daniel Miller	821	2010–11 2011–12 2012–13 2013–14
9	John Salley	798	1982–83 1983–84 1984–85 1985–86
10	Ben Lammers	774	2014–15 2015–16 2016–17 2017–18

Season
Rank	Player	Rebounds	Season
1	Jim Caldwell	364	1963–64
2	Rich Yunkus	356	1970–71
3	Charles Mitchell	349	2015–16
4	Jim Caldwell	346	1964–65
5	Ben Lammers	342	2016–17
6	Rich Yunkus	323	1969–70
7	Malcolm Mackey	321	1990–91
8	Malcolm Mackey	316	1991–92
9	Alvin Jones	312	2000–01
10	Malcolm Mackey	306	1992–93

Single game
Rank	Player	Rebounds	Season	Opponent
1	Eric Crake	27	1952–53	Georgia
2	Jim Caldwell	26	1963–64	Georgia
3	Pete Silas	24	1952–53	Furman
4	Jim Caldwell	23	1964–65	Mississippi State
5	Dick Lenholt	22	1954–55	Georgia
	Dave Denton	22	1957–58	Kentucky
7	Frank Inman	21	1958–59	Florida
	Jim Caldwell	21	1963–64	Mississippi
	Jim Caldwell	21	1963–64	Georgia
10	Bill Cohen	20	1955–56	LSU
	Jim Caldwell	20	1963–64	Florida State
	Jim Caldwell	20	1964–65	Ohio State
	Mike Green	20	1974–75	St. Bonaventure
	Moses Wright	20	2020–21	Georgia State

== Assists ==
Career
Rank	Player	Assists	Seasons
1	Drew Barry	724	1992–93 1993–94 1994–95 1995–96
2	Travis Best	692	1991–92 1992–93 1993–94 1994–95
3	Craig Neal	659	1983–84 1984–85 1985–86 1986–87 1987–88
4	Tony Akins	560	1998–99 1999–00 2000–01 2001–02
5	Jarrett Jack	543	2002–03 2003–04 2004–05
6	Brian Oliver	538	1986–87 1987–88 1988–89 1989–90
7	Mark Price	510	1982–83 1983–84 1984–85 1985–86
8	Kenny Anderson	454	1989–90 1990–91
9	Bruce Dalrymple	446	1983–84 1984–85 1985–86 1986–87
10	Jim Thorne	410	1968–69 1969–70 1970–71

Season
Rank	Player	Assists	Season
1	Craig Neal	303	1987–88
2	Kenny Anderson	285	1989–90
3	Drew Barry	238	1995–96
4	Brian Oliver	223	1988–89
5	Naithan George	221	2024–25
6	Jarrett Jack	213	2003–04
7	Jon Barry	207	1991–92
8	Travis Best	198	1991–92
9	Jarrett Jack	185	2002–03
10	Javaris Crittenton	184	2006–07

Single game
Rank	Player	Assists	Season	Opponent
1	Craig Neal	19	1987–88	Duke
2	Kenny Anderson	18	1989–90	Pittsburgh
3	Craig Neal	17	1987–88	Virginia
	Kenny Anderson	17	1989–90	North Carolina
5	Mark Price	14	1984–85	Monmouth
	Craig Neal	14	1987–88	Duke
	Craig Neal	14	1987–88	Maryland
	Craig Neal	14	1987–88	NC State
	Brian Oliver	14	1988–89	Clemson
10	Steve Sherbak	13	1972–73	Oklahoma City
	Craig Neal	13	1986–87	North Carolina A&T
	Craig Neal	13	1987–88	Maryland
	Kenny Anderson	13	1989–90	Fordham
	Kenny Anderson	13	1990–91	Morgan State
	Kenny Anderson	13	1990–91	North Carolina
	Jon Barry	13	1991–92	NC State
	Drew Barry	13	1994–95	Virginia

== Steals ==
Career
Rank	Player	Steals	Seasons
1	Mark Price	240	1982–83 1983–84 1984–85 1985–86
2	Bruce Dalrymple	227	1983–84 1984–85 1985–86 1986–87
3	Jose Alvarado	226	2017–18 2018–19 2019–20 2020–21
4	Travis Best	217	1991–92 1992–93 1993–94 1994–95
5	Iman Shumpert	207	2008–09 2009–10 2010–11
6	Drew Barry	193	1992–93 1993–94 1994–95 1995–96
7	Jarrett Jack	183	2002–03 2003–04 2004–05
8	Matt Harpring	176	1994–95 1995–96 1996–97 1997–98
9	Tony Akins	173	1998–99 1999–00 2000–01 2001–02
10	Kenny Anderson	168	1989–90 1990–91

Season
Rank	Player	Steals	Season
1	Kenny Anderson	89	1990–91
2	Iman Shumpert	85	2010–11
3	Kenny Anderson	79	1989–90
4	Jarrett Jack	74	2003–04
	Jose Alvarado	74	2020–21
6	Jon Barry	71	1991–92
7	Bruce Dalrymple	70	1985–86
	Dion Glover	70	1997–98
9	Mark Price	66	1984–85
10	Bruce Dalrymple	65	1984–85
	Drew Barry	65	1995–96
	Javaris Crittenton	65	2006–07

Single game
Rank	Player	Steals	Season	Opponent
1	Jose Alvarado	9	2019–20	NC State
2	Kenny Anderson	8	1990–91	Duke
3	Mark Price	7	1983–84	Clemson
	Mark Price	7	1985–86	Texas A&M
	Travis Best	7	1992–93	Georgia State
	Stephon Marbury	7	1995–96	Georgetown
	Jarrett Jack	7	2002–03	NC State
	Javaris Crittenton	7	2006–07	Clemson
	Iman Shumpert	7	2010–11	Virginia Tech
	Jose Alvarado	7	2019–20	Miami (FL)

== Blocks ==
Career
Rank	Player	Blocks	Seasons
1	Alvin Jones	425	1997–98 1998–99 1999–00 2000–01
2	Daniel Miller	286	2010–11 2011–12 2012–13 2013–14
3	Ben Lammers	254	2014–15 2015–16 2016–17 2017–18
4	John Salley	243	1982–83 1983–84 1984–85 1985–86
5	Malcolm Mackey	199	1989–90 1990–91 1991–92 1992–93
6	Eddie Elisma	174	1993–94 1994–95 1995–96 1996–97
7	Luke Schenscher	157	2001–02 2002–03 2003–04 2004–05
8	James Banks III	154	2018–19 2019–20
9	Gani Lawal	127	2007–08 2008–09 2009–10
10	Moses Wright	108	2017–18 2018–19 2019–20 2020–21

Season
Rank	Player	Blocks	Season
1	Alvin Jones	141	1997–98
2	Ben Lammers	125	2016–17
3	Alvin Jones	107	1998–99
4	Alvin Jones	101	2000–01
5	John Salley	82	1984–85
6	Daniel Miller	80	2013–14
7	Ben Lammers	78	2017–18
	James Banks III	78	2018–19
9	Alvin Jones	76	1999–00
	James Banks III	76	2019–20

Single game
Rank	Player	Blocks	Season	Opponent
1	Alvin Jones	11	1997–98	Winthrop
2	Alvin Jones	9	1997–98	Georgetown
	Alvin Jones	9	1998–99	Charleston Southern
	Ben Lammers	9	2016–17	Southern
5	Alvin Jones	8	1997–98	Georgia Southern
	Alvin Jones	8	1997–98	Delaware State
	Alvin Jones	8	1997–98	Coastal Carolina
	Alvin Jones	8	1998–99	Mount St. Mary’s
	Alvin Jones	8	1999–00	Mercer
	Alvin Jones	8	2000–01	Harvard
	Alvin Jones	8	2000–01	Maryland
	Ben Lammers	8	2016–17	Virginia Tech
	Ben Lammers	8	2016–17	Mississippi
	Ben Lammers	8	2017–18	Bethune-Cookman
	James Banks III	8	2019–20	Bethune-Cookman
