= 1997–98 North Carolina Tar Heels men's basketball team =

American college basketball season

1997–98 North Carolina Tar Heels men's basketball

NCAA Division I regular season champions Great Alaska Shootout champions

ACC tournament champions

NCAA tournament, Final Four
- Conference: Atlantic Coast Conference

Ranking
- Coaches: No. 3
- AP: No. 1
- Record: 34–4 (13–3 ACC)
- Head coach: Bill Guthridge (1st season)
- Assistant coaches: Phil Ford (10th season); Dave Hanners (8th season); Pat Sullivan (1st season)
- Home arena: Dean Smith Center

1997–98 ACC men's basketball standings
	Conf.				Overall
Team	W		L	PCT	W		L	PCT
No. 3 Duke	15	–	1	.938	32	–	4	.889
No. 1 North Carolina†	13	–	3	.813	34	–	4	.895
No. 20 Maryland	10	–	6	.625	21	–	11	.656
Wake Forest	7	–	9	.438	16	–	14	.533
Clemson	7	–	9	.438	18	–	14	.563
Georgia Tech	6	–	10	.375	19	–	14	.576
Florida State	6	–	10	.375	18	–	4	.818
NC State	5	–	11	.313	17	–	15	.531
Virginia	3	–	13	.188	11	–	19	.367
† 1998 ACC tournament winner Rankings from AP poll

The 1997–98 North Carolina Tar Heels men's basketball team represented the University of North Carolina at Chapel Hill during the 1997–98 NCAA Division I men's basketball season. The team's head coach was Bill Guthridge, who was in his first season as UNC's head men's basketball coach. The Tar Heels played their home games at the Dean Smith Center in Chapel Hill, North Carolina as members of the Atlantic Coast Conference.

== Roster ==
1997–98 North Carolina Tar Heels men's basketball team
Players
Coaches

Pos.	#	Name	Height	Weight	Year	Previous school	Hometown
C	00	Brendan Haywood	6 ft 11 in (2.11 m)	265 lb (120 kg)	Fr	Dudley	Greensboro, North Carolina
G	3	Shammond Williams (C)	6 ft 2 in (1.88 m)	180 lb (82 kg)	Sr	Fork Union Military	Greenville, South Carolina
F	4	Makhtar N'Diaye (C)	6 ft 9 in (2.06 m)	245 lb (111 kg)	Sr	Oak Hill Academy	Dakar, Senegal
G	5	Ed Cota	6 ft 1 in (1.85 m)	177 lb (80 kg)	So	St. Thomas More School	Brooklyn, New York
G	11	Michael Booker	6 ft 5 in (1.96 m)	193 lb (88 kg)	Fr	Brentwood Academy	Sandersville, Georgia
F/C	13	Ademola Okulaja	6 ft 9 in (2.06 m)	231 lb (105 kg)	Jr	John F. Kennedy High School	Berlin, Germany
G/F	15	Vince Carter	6 ft 6 in (1.98 m)	208 lb (94 kg)	Jr	Mainland High School	Daytona Beach, Florida
G	21	Terrence Newby	6 ft 2 in (1.88 m)	207 lb (94 kg)	So	Jordan-Matthews	Siler City, North Carolina
G	22	Scott Williams	5 ft 11 in (1.8 m)	156 lb (71 kg)	Jr	Lawrence	Lawrence, Kansas
F	24	Max Owens	6 ft 4 in (1.93 m)	190 lb (86 kg)	Fr	Mount Zion Academy	Macon, Georgia
F	32	Orlando Meléndez	6 ft 7 in (2.01 m)	190 lb (86 kg)	Fr	McDowell	Juana Díaz, Puerto Rico
F/C	33	Antawn Jamison	6 ft 9 in (2.06 m)	222 lb (101 kg)	Jr	Providence	Charlotte, North Carolina
F	35	Brad Frederick	6 ft 5 in (1.96 m)	195 lb (88 kg)	Jr	Lawrence	Lawrence, Kansas
F/C	50	Brian Bersticker	6 ft 11 in (2.11 m)	210 lb (95 kg)	Fr	Kempsville	Virginia Beach, Virginia

Head coach

- Bill Guthridge (Kansas State)

Assistant coach(es)

- Phil Ford (North Carolina)
- Dave Hanners (North Carolina)
- Pat Sullivan (North Carolina)

Legend

- (C) Team captain
- (S) Suspended
- (I) Ineligible
- (W) Walk-on
- Injured
- Current redshirt

Roster

== Schedule and results ==
This season was Guthridge's first year as head coach, after the unexpected retirement of Dean Smith two months before the start of the season.

Guthridge instituted a "six starters" system, whereby the team's top six players, Antawn Jamison, Vince Carter, Ed Cota, Shammond Williams, Ademola Okulaja and Makhtar N'Diaye rotated positions in the starting five.

Date time, TV	Rank^{#}	Opponent^{#}	Result	Record	Site city, state
Regular season
Nov 14, 1997*	No. 4	Middle Tennessee	W 84–56	1–0	Dean Smith Center; Chapel Hill, NC
Nov 19, 1997*	No. 4	at Richmond	W 84–65	2–0	Robins Center; Richmond, VA
Nov 22, 1997*	No. 4	California	W 71–47	3–0	Dean Smith Center; Chapel Hill, NC
Nov 27, 1997*	No. 4	vs. No. 7 UCLA; Great Alaska Shootout	W 109–68	4-0	Sullivan Arena; Anchorage, AK
Nov 28, 1997*	No. 4	vs. Seton Hall; Great Alaska Shootout	W 95–65	5-0	Sullivan Arena; Anchorage, AK
Nov 29, 1997*	No. 4	vs. No. 6 Purdue; Great Alaska Shootout	W 73–69	6–0	Sullivan Arena; Anchorage, AK
Dec 3, 1997*	No. 3	vs. Louisville	W 81–72	7–0	United Center; Chicago, IL
Dec 5, 1997*	No. 3	vs. Chattanooga	W 68–38	8–0	Bojangles Coliseum; Charlotte, NC
Dec 6, 1997*	No. 3	vs. Virginia Tech	W 78–57	9–0	Bojangles Coliseum; Charlotte, NC
Dec 13, 1997*	No. 2	Princeton	W 50–42	10–0	Dean Smith Center; Chapel Hill, NC
Dec 16, 1997*	No. 1	Hampton	W 92–69	11–0	Dean Smith Center; Chapel Hill, NC
Dec 20, 1997	No. 1	at No. 17 Florida State	W 81–73	12–0 (1–0)	Donald L. Tucker Civic Center; Tallahassee, FL
Dec 27, 1997*	No. 1	at Georgia	W 82–80 ^{OT}	13–0	Stegeman Coliseum; Athens, GA
Dec 29, 1997*	No. 1	at Bethune–Cookman	W 97–46	14–0	Moore Gymnasium; Daytona Beach, FL
Jan 3, 1998	No. 1	at No. 21 Clemson	W 73–70	15–0 (2–0)	Littlejohn Coliseum; Clemson, SC
Jan 8, 1998	No. 1	Georgia Tech	W 96–75	16–0 (3–0)	Dean Smith Center; Chapel Hill, NC
Jan 10, 1998	No. 1	Virginia	W 81–73	17–0 (4–0)	Dean Smith Center; Chapel Hill, NC
Jan 14, 1998	No. 1	at Maryland	L 83–89 ^{OT}	17–1 (4–1)	Cole Field House; College Park, MD
Jan 17, 1998*	No. 1	Appalachian State	W 96–63	18–1	Dean Smith Center; Chapel Hill, NC
Jan 21, 1998	No. 2	at NC State; Carolina–State Game	W 74–60	19–1 (5–1)	Reynolds Coliseum; Raleigh, NC
Jan 24, 1998	No. 2	No. 20 Florida State	W 103–55	20–1 (6–1)	Dean Smith Center; Chapel Hill, NC
Jan 28, 1998	No. 2	Clemson	W 88–79	21–1 (7–1)	Dean Smith Center; Chapel Hill, NC
Jan 31, 1998	No. 2	at Wake Forest	W 79–73	22–1 (8–1)	Lawrence Joel Coliseum; Winston-Salem, NC
Feb 5, 1998	No. 2	No. 1 Duke; Rivalry	W 97–73	23–1 (9–1)	Dean Smith Center; Chapel Hill, NC
Feb 8, 1998	No. 2	at Georgia Tech	W 107–100 ^{OT}	24–1 (10–1)	Alexander Memorial Coliseum; Atlanta, GA
Feb 11, 1998	No. 1	at Virginia	W 60–45	25–1 (11–1)	University Hall; Charlottesville, VA
Feb 14, 1998	No. 1	No. 24 Maryland	W 85–67	26–1 (12–1)	Dean Smith Center; Chapel Hill, NC
Feb 21, 1998	No. 1	NC State; Carolina–State Game	L 72–86	26–2 (12–2)	Dean Smith Center; Chapel Hill, NC
Feb 24, 1998	No. 3	Wake Forest	W 72–53	27–2 (13–2)	Dean Smith Center; Chapel Hill, NC
Feb 28, 1998	No. 3	at No. 1 Duke; Rivalry	L 75–77	27–3 (13–3)	Cameron Indoor Stadium; Durham, NC
ACC tournament
Mar 6, 1998	(2) No. 4	vs. (7) NC State; Quarterfinals	W 73–46	28–3	Greensboro Coliseum Complex; Greensboro, NC
Mar 7, 1998	(2) No. 4	vs. (3) No. 21 Maryland; Semifinals	W 83–73 ^{OT}	29–3	Greensboro Coliseum Complex; Greensboro, NC
Mar 8, 1998	(2) No. 4	vs. (1) No. 1 Duke; Championship Game	W 83–68	30–3	Greensboro Coliseum Complex; Greensboro, NC
NCAA tournament
Mar 12, 1998*	(1 E) No. 1	vs. (16 E) Navy; First Round	W 88–52	31–3	Hartford Civic Center; Hartford, CT
Mar 14, 1998*	(1 E) No. 1	vs. (8 E) Charlotte; Second Round	W 93–83 ^{OT}	32–3	Hartford Civic Center; Hartford, CT
Mar 19, 1998*	(1 E) No. 1	vs. (4 E) No. 16 Michigan State; Sweet Sixteen	W 73–58	33–3	Greensboro Coliseum; Greensboro, NC
Mar 21, 1998*	(1 E) No. 1	vs. (2 E) No. 6 Connecticut; Elite Eight	W 75–64	34–3	Greensboro Coliseum; Greensboro, NC
Mar 28, 1998*	(1 E) No. 1	vs. (3 W) No. 7 Utah; Final Four	L 59–65	34–4	Alamodome; San Antonio, TX
*Non-conference game. ^{#}Rankings from AP Poll. (#) Tournament seedings in parentheses. E=East region. All times are in Eastern Time.

== Team players drafted into the NBA ==
Year	Round	Pick	Player	NBA club
1998	1	4	Antawn Jamison	Toronto Raptors
1998	1	5	Vince Carter	Golden State Warriors
1998	2	34	Shammond Williams	Chicago Bulls
2001	1	20	Brendan Haywood	Cleveland Cavaliers
