= 1997–98 Duke Blue Devils men's basketball team =

American college basketball season

1997–98 Duke Blue Devils men's basketball

ACC regular season champions Maui Invitational champions

NCAA tournament, Elite Eight
- Conference: Atlantic Coast Conference

Ranking
- Coaches: No. 5
- AP: No. 3
- Record: 32–4 (15–1 ACC)
- Head coach: Mike Krzyzewski (18th season)
- Assistant coaches: Quin Snyder; Johnny Dawkins; David Henderson
- Home arena: Cameron Indoor Stadium

1997–98 ACC men's basketball standings
	Conf.				Overall
Team	W		L	PCT	W		L	PCT
No. 3 Duke	15	–	1	.938	32	–	4	.889
No. 1 North Carolina†	13	–	3	.813	34	–	4	.895
No. 20 Maryland	10	–	6	.625	21	–	11	.656
Wake Forest	7	–	9	.438	16	–	14	.533
Clemson	7	–	9	.438	18	–	14	.563
Georgia Tech	6	–	10	.375	19	–	14	.576
Florida State	6	–	10	.375	18	–	4	.818
NC State	5	–	11	.313	17	–	15	.531
Virginia	3	–	13	.188	11	–	19	.367
† 1998 ACC tournament winner Rankings from AP poll

The 1997–98 Duke Blue Devils men's basketball team represented Duke University. The head coach was Mike Krzyzewski. The team played its home games in the Cameron Indoor Stadium in Durham, North Carolina, and was a member of the Atlantic Coast Conference. Duke finished with an overall record of 32–4 (15–1 ACC).

In the 1998 NCAA Tournament the Blue Devils were invited as a #1 seed. Duke advanced all the way to the Elite 8 with wins over Radford, Oklahoma State and Syracuse. Their season came to an end with a close loss to Kentucky 86–84.

== Roster ==
1998–99 Duke Blue Devils men's basketball team
Players
Coaches

Pos.	#	Name	Height	Weight	Year	Previous school	Hometown
G	5	William Avery	6 ft 2 in (1.88 m)	190 lb (86 kg)	Fr	Oak Hill	Augusta, GA
F	31	Shane Battier	6 ft 8 in (2.03 m)	220 lb (100 kg)	Fr	Country Day	Birmingham, MI
C	42	Elton Brand	6 ft 9 in (2.06 m)	254 lb (115 kg)	Fr	Peekskill	Peekskill, NY
F/C	34	Chris Burgess	6 ft 10 in (2.08 m)	244 lb (111 kg)	Fr	Woodbridge	Irvine, CA
G/F	23	Chris Carrawell	6 ft 6 in (1.98 m)	220 lb (100 kg)	So	Cardinal Ritter	St. Louis, MO
F	0	Mike Chappell	6 ft 8 in (2.03 m)	195 lb (88 kg)	So	Southfield-Lathrup	Southfield, MI
F/C	41	Taymon Domzalski	6 ft 10 in (2.08 m)	240 lb (109 kg)	Jr	New Mexico Military	Lovington, NM
G	22	Jay Heaps	5 ft 9 in (1.75 m)	155 lb (70 kg)	Jr	Longmeadow	Longmeadow, MA
G/F	14	Nate James	6 ft 6 in (1.98 m)	205 lb (93 kg)	Fr	St. John	Washington, DC
G	21	Trajan Langdon	6 ft 4 in (1.93 m)	211 lb (96 kg)	RS Jr	East Anchorage	Anchorage, AK
F	4	Roshown McLeod	6 ft 8 in (2.03 m)	220 lb (100 kg)	Sr	St. Anthony's	Jersey City, NJ
G/F	3	Ricky Price	6 ft 6 in (1.98 m)	190 lb (86 kg)	Sr	Serra	Gardena, CA
G	13	J.D. Simpson	6 ft 4 in (1.93 m)	200 lb (91 kg)	Fr	St. Francis	Woodside, CA
F	15	Todd Singleton	6 ft 4 in (1.93 m)	195 lb (88 kg)	Sr	Old Mill	Severn, MD
G	12	Steve Wojciechowski	5 ft 11 in (1.8 m)	180 lb (82 kg)	Sr	Cardinal Gibbons	Severn, MD

Head coach

- Mike Krzyzewski

Assistant coach(es)

- Quin Snyder
- David Henderson
- Johnny Dawkins

Legend

- (C) Team captain
- (S) Suspended
- (I) Ineligible
- (W) Walk-on
- Injured
- Current redshirt

Roster
Last update: 2021-01-23

== Schedule and results ==
Date time, TV	Rank^{#}	Opponent^{#}	Result	Record	Site city, state
Regular season
November 16, 1997*	No. 3	at Army	W 78–45	1–0	Christl Arena; West Point, NY
November 20, 1997*	No. 3	Davidson	W 100–65	2–0	Cameron Indoor Stadium; Durham, NC
November 24, 1997*	No. 3	vs. Chaminade; Maui Invitational	W 106–70	3–0	Lahaina Civic Center; Lahaina, HI
November 25, 1997*	No. 3	vs. Missouri; Maui Invitational	W 82–59	4–0	Lahaina Civic Center; Lahaina, HI
November 26, 1997*	No. 3	vs. No. 1 Arizona; Maui Invitational	W 95–87	5–0	Lahaina Civic Center; Lahaina, HI
December 1, 1997*	No. 1	South Carolina State	W 98–40	6–0	Cameron Indoor Stadium; Durham, NC
December 3, 1997*	No. 1	UNC Greensboro	W 93–37	7–0	Cameron Indoor Stadium; Durham, NC
December 6, 1997	No. 1	Virginia	W 103–59	8–0	Cameron Indoor Stadium; Durham, NC
December 10, 1997*	No. 1	Villanova	W 94–66	9–0	Cameron Indoor Stadium; Durham, NC
December 13, 1997*	No. 1	at Michigan	L 73–81	9–1	Crisler Arena; Ann Arbor, MI
December 21, 1997*	No. 3	Mercer	W 126–64	10–1	Cameron Indoor Stadium; Durham, NC
December 30, 1997*	No. 3	Portland State	W 89–39	11–1	Cameron Indoor Stadium; Durham, NC
January 3, 1998	No. 3	at No. 20 Maryland	W 104–72	12–1	Cole Field House; College Park, MD
January 7, 1998	No. 2	NC State	W 64–50	13–1	Cameron Indoor Stadium; Durham, NC
January 10, 1998	No. 2	at No. 13 Florida State	W 75–63	14–1	Donald L. Tucker Center; Tallahassee, FL
January 14, 1998	No. 2	at Wake Forest	W 88–52	15–1	LVJM Coliseum; Winston-Salem, NC
January 17, 1998	No. 2	Clemson	W 81–80	16–1	Cameron Indoor Stadium; Durham, NC
January 20, 1998*	No. 1	vs. North Carolina A&T	W 101–66	17–1	Greensboro Coliseum; Greensboro, NC
January 24, 1998	No. 1	at Virginia	W 72–65	18–1	University Hall; Charlottesville, VA
January 29, 1998	No. 1	No. 23 Maryland	W 86–59	19–1	Cameron Indoor Stadium; Durham, NC
February 1, 1998	No. 1	Georgia Tech	W 90–69	20–1	Cameron Indoor Stadium; Durham, NC
February 5, 1998	No. 1	at No. 2 North Carolina	L 73–97	20–2	Dean Smith Center; Chapel Hill, NC
February 8, 1998	No. 1	at NC State	W 65–49	21–2	Reynolds Coliseum; Raleigh, NC
February 10, 1998	No. 2	Florida State	W 86–72	22–2	Cameron Indoor Stadium; Durham, NC
February 14, 1998	No. 2	Wake Forest	W 78–47	23–2	Cameron Indoor Stadium; Durham, NC
February 18, 1998	No. 2	at Clemson	W 70–66	24–2	Littlejohn Coliseum; Clemson, SC
February 22, 1998*	No. 2	No. 12 UCLA	W 120–84	25–2	Cameron Indoor Stadium; Durham, NC
February 25, 1998	No. 1	at Georgia Tech	W 76–53	26–2	Alexander Memorial Coliseum; Atlanta, GA
February 28, 1998	No. 1	No. 3 North Carolina	W 77–75	27–2	Cameron Indoor Stadium; Durham, NC
ACC Tournament
March 5, 1998	No. 1	vs. Virginia; ACC tournament first round	W 63–41	28–2	Greensboro Coliseum; Greensboro, NC
March 7, 1998	No. 1	vs. Clemson; ACC Tournament Semifinal	W 66–64	29–2	Greensboro Coliseum; Greensboro, NC
March 8, 1998	No. 1	vs. No. 4 North Carolina; ACC Tournament Final	L 68–83	29–3	Greensboro Coliseum; Greensboro, NC
NCAA Tournament
March 13, 1998*	(1) No. 3	vs. (16) Radford; NCAA South First round	W 99–63	30–3	Rupp Arena; Lexington, KY
March 15, 1998*	(1) No. 3	vs. (8) Oklahoma State; NCAA South Second Round	W 79–73	31–3	Rupp Arena; Lexington, KY
March 20, 1998*	(1) No. 3	vs. (5) No. 21 Syracuse; NCAA South Regional semifinal	W 80–67	32–3	Tropicana Field; St. Petersburg, FL
March 22, 1998*	(1) No. 3	vs. (2) No. 5 Kentucky; NCAA South Regional Final	L 84–86	32–4	Tropicana Field; St. Petersburg, FL
*Non-conference game. ^{#}Rankings from AP Poll. (#) Tournament seedings in parentheses. Source: Duke media guide

== Departing players drafted into the NBA ==
Round	Pick	Player	NBA club
1	20	Roshown McLeod	Atlanta Hawks
