= 2024–25 Louisville Cardinals men's basketball team =

American college basketball season

2024–25 Louisville Cardinals men's basketball

NCAA tournament, First Round
- Conference: Atlantic Coast Conference

Ranking
- Coaches: No. 21
- AP: No. 21
- Record: 27–8 (18–2 ACC)
- Head coach: Pat Kelsey (1st season)
- Assistant coaches: Brian Kloman; Thomas Carr; Ronnie Hamilton; Mike Cassidy; Jermaine Ukaegbu
- Home arena: KFC Yum! Center

2024–25 ACC men's basketball standings
	Conf.				Overall
Team	W		L	PCT	W		L	PCT
No. 3 Duke †	19	–	1	.950	35	–	4	.897
No. 21 Louisville	18	–	2	.900	27	–	8	.771
No. 22 Clemson	18	–	2	.900	27	–	7	.794
Wake Forest	13	–	7	.650	21	–	11	.656
North Carolina	13	–	7	.650	23	–	14	.622
SMU	13	–	7	.650	24	–	11	.686
Stanford	11	–	9	.550	21	–	14	.600
Georgia Tech	10	–	10	.500	17	–	17	.500
Virginia	8	–	12	.400	15	–	17	.469
Virginia Tech	8	–	12	.400	13	–	19	.406
Florida State	8	–	12	.400	17	–	15	.531
Notre Dame	8	–	12	.400	15	–	18	.455
Pittsburgh	8	–	12	.400	17	–	15	.531
Syracuse	7	–	13	.350	14	–	19	.424
California	6	–	14	.300	14	–	19	.424
NC State	5	–	15	.250	12	–	19	.387
Boston College	4	–	16	.200	12	–	19	.387
Miami (FL)	3	–	17	.150	7	–	24	.226
† 2025 ACC tournament winner Rankings from AP poll

The 2024–25 Louisville Cardinals men's basketball team represented the University of Louisville during the 2024–25 NCAA Division I men's basketball season. The team played its home games on Denny Crum Court at the KFC Yum! Center in downtown Louisville, Kentucky as members of the Atlantic Coast Conference (ACC). They were led by first-year head coach Pat Kelsey.

The Cardinals began their season with a victory over Morehead State before facing twelfth-ranked Tennessee. The Volunteers defeated the Cardinals 77–55. The Cardinals won two games before traveling to the Bahamas to participate in the Battle 4 Atlantis. They posted an 89–61 victory in the opening game against fourteenth-ranked Indiana and defeated West Virginia in overtime to reach the final. They were defeated 69–64 by Oklahoma to finish in second place. Upon their return home they lost two twenty third-ranked Ole Miss in the ACC–SEC Challenge and they lost their ACC opener against ninth-ranked Duke. They rebounded with a defeat of UTEP before losing to rivals and fifth-ranked Kentucky.

The Cardinals then went on a ten-game winning streak, which included nine ACC wins. The lone non-conference victory was a three-point win over Eastern Kentucky. Only one of the victories in this run was by less than double-digits, and that was a four-point victory at Pittsburgh. The streak saw the Cardinals reach twenty-first in the rankings, before a 77–70 loss at Georgia Tech ended the streak and their stint in the rankings. The loss was just a blip as the Cardinals went on nine-game winning streak to finish the season. The run had only one game that the Cardinals won by less than double-digits; an 89–81 victory at Florida State. The Cardinals climbed back into the rankings on the run, finishing the regular season ranked thirteenth. They finished the regular season with wins over ACC newcomers California and Stanford, defeating the latter by twenty points in their final regular season game.

The Cardinals finished the season 27–8 and 18–2 in ACC play to finish in a tie for second place. As the second seed in the 2025 ACC tournament earned a bye into Quarterfinals where they defeated seventh seed Stanford for the second time in five days. The tournament game was much closer as the Cardinals advanced 75–73. In the Semifinals defeated third seed and tenth-ranked Clemson 76–73. The lost to first seed and top ranked Duke 73–62 in the final. They received an at-large bid to the NCAA Tournament. The Cardinals were an eight-seed in the South region. They lost 89–75 to nine-seed Creighton in the First Round to end their season.

The Louisville Cardinals drew an average home attendance of 14,864, the 15th-highest of all college basketball teams.

== Previous season ==
The Cardinals began the season with a one-point win against UMBC but lost to Chattanooga in their second game of the season. After defeating Coppin State, they lost both of their games in the Empire Classic. They then went on a two-game winning streak, including an overtime victory over New Mexico State. They went on a three-game losing streak from there, including an opening ACC game loss to Virginia Tech. Their only other win in 2023 was on December 17 against Pepperdine. The Cardinals first ACC win game at Miami (FL) on January 10, 2024. This was Kenny Payne's first road win as head coach. The team lost six straight games after the win. Their next wins came on February 3 and February 10, 2024, and were split by a road loss to Syracuse. The Cardinals would lose their final seven games of the ACC regular season.

The Cardinals finished the 2023–24 season 8–24 and 3–17 in ACC play to finish in fifteenth place. As the fifteenth seed in the ACC tournament, they lost to tenth seed NC State in the First Round. They were not invited to the NCAA tournament or the NIT. After their ACC tournament loss, the Cardinals fired head coach Kenny Payne.

== Offseason ==
=== Coaching changes ===
After the dismissal of head coach Kenny Payne, previous Winthrop and Charleston head coach Pat Kelsey was signed to a five-year deal as the 24th coach in Louisville's history. Kelsey quickly brought a number of Charleston staff members to Louisville, including Brian Kloman and Thomas Carr as assistant coaches, Eli Foy as the head strength and conditioning coach, Jermaine Ukaegbu as the director of player personnel, and Mitch Johnson as the director of basketball operations. Other hires include LSU's Ronnie Hamilton as assistant coach and retired Louisville player Peyton Siva as the director of player development/alumni relations.

=== Departures ===
Departures
Name	Number	Pos.	Height	Weight	Year	Hometown	Reason for Departure
Mike James	0	G/F	6'6"	220	(redshirt) Sophomore	Orlando, Florida	Transferred to NC State
Curtis Williams	1	G/F	6'5"	205	Freshman	Detroit, Michigan	Transferred to Georgetown
Koron Davis	3	G	6'6"	185	Junior	Gary, Indiana	Transferred to Louisiana
Ty-Laur Johnson	4	G	6'0"	160	Freshman	Brooklyn, New York	Transferred to Wake Forest
Brandon Huntley-Hatfield	5	F	6'10"	240	Junior	Clarksville, Tennessee	Transferred to NC State
Kaleb Glenn	10	F	6'6"	205	Freshman	Louisville, Kentucky	Transferred to FAU
Dennis Evans	11	C	7'1"	215	Freshman	Riverside, California	Transferred to Grand Canyon
JJ Traynor	12	F	6'8"	190	Senior	Bardstown, Kentucky	Transferred to DePaul
Danilo Jovanovich	13	F	6'8"	220	Sophomore	Milwaukee, Wisconsin	Transferred to Milwaukee
Hercy Miller	13	F	6'8"	220	Junior	Minneapolis, Minnesota	Transferred to Southern Utah
Tre White	22	G	6'7"	205	Sophomore	Dallas, Texas	Transferred to Illinois
Emmanuel Okorafor	34	F/C	6'9"	220	Sophomore	Albia, Nigeria	Transferred to Seton Hall
Skyy Clark	55	G	6'3"	205	Sophomore	Los Angeles, California	Transferred to UCLA

=== Incoming transfers ===
Incoming transfers
Name	Number	Pos.	Height	Weight	Year	Hometown	Previous School
James Scott	0	F	6'11"	210	Sophomore	Fayetteville, North Carolina	Charleston
J'Vonne Hadley	1	G	6'6"	205	5th	Saint Paul, Minnesota	Colorado
Koren Johnson	3	G	6'2"	175	Junior	Seattle, Washington	Washington
Cole Sherman	4	G	5'11"	190	Junior	Louisville, Kentucky	Northern Kentucky
Terrence Edwards Jr.	5	G/F	6'6"	190	Senior	Atlanta, Georgia	James Madison
Reyne Smith	6	G	6'2"	190	Senior	Ulverstone, Tasmania	Charleston
Kasean Pryor	7	F	6'10"	210	5th	Chicago, Illinois	South Florida
Kobe Rodgers	11	G	6'3"	180	(redshirt) Senior	Cincinnati, Ohio	Charleston
Patrick Antonelli	12	G	5'11"	170	5th	Mount Pleasant, South Carolina	Emory and Henry
Frank Anselem-Ibe	13	C	6'10"	215	5th	Lagos, Nigeria	Georgia
Aly Khalifa	15	C	6'11"	270	(redshirt) Senior	Alexandria, Egypt	BYU
Chucky Hepburn	24	G	6'2"	195	Senior	Omaha, Nebraska	Wisconsin
Aboubacar Traore	25	F	6'5"	195	Senior	Abidjan, Ivory Coast	Long Beach State
Noah Waterman	93	F	6'11"	220	6th	Savannah, New York	BYU

=== 2024 recruiting class ===
College recruiting
Name	Hometown	School	Height	Weight	Commit date
Khani Rooths #9 F	Washington, D.C.	IMG Academy	6 ft 8 in (2.03 m)	200 lb (91 kg)	May 15, 2024
Khani Rooths #9 F	Recruit ratings: Rivals: 247Sports: ESPN: (88)				
Overall recruit ranking:
Note: In many cases, Scout, Rivals, 247Sports, On3, and ESPN may conflict in their listings of height and weight.; In these cases, the average was taken. ESPN grades are on a 100-point scale.; Sources: "2024 Louisville Commitments". Rivals.; "Men's Basketball Recruiting". Scout.; "ESPN- Louisville Cardinals Men's Basketball Recruiting". ESPN.; "Scout.com Team Recruiting Rankings". Scout.; "2024 Team Ranking". Rivals.

== Roster ==
2024–25 Louisville Cardinals men's basketball team
Players
Coaches

Pos.	#	Name	Height	Weight	Year	Previous school	Hometown
F	0	James Scott	6 ft 11 in (2.11 m)	210 lb (95 kg)	So	Charleston	Fayetteville, NC
G	1	J'Vonne Hadley	6 ft 6 in (1.98 m)	205 lb (93 kg)	GS	Colorado	Saint Paul, MN
G	3	Koren Johnson (injured)	6 ft 2 in (1.88 m)	175 lb (79 kg)	Jr	Washington	Seattle, WA
G	4	Cole Sherman (W)	5 ft 11 in (1.8 m)	190 lb (86 kg)	Jr	Northern Kentucky	Louisville, KY
G/F	5	Terrence Edwards Jr.	6 ft 6 in (1.98 m)	190 lb (86 kg)	Sr	James Madison	Atlanta, GA
G	6	Reyne Smith	6 ft 2 in (1.88 m)	190 lb (86 kg)	Sr	Charleston	Ulverstone, Tasmania
F	7	Kasean Pryor (injured)	6 ft 10 in (2.08 m)	210 lb (95 kg)	Sr	South Florida	Chicago, IL
F	9	Khani Rooths	6 ft 8 in (2.03 m)	200 lb (91 kg)	Fr	IMG Academy	Washington, D.C.
G	11	Kobe Rodgers	6 ft 3 in (1.91 m)	180 lb (82 kg)	RS Sr	Charleston	Cincinnati, OH
G	12	Patrick Antonelli (W)	5 ft 11 in (1.8 m)	170 lb (77 kg)	GS	Emory and Henry	Mount Pleasant, SC
C	13	Frank Anselem-Ibe	6 ft 10 in (2.08 m)	215 lb (98 kg)	GS	Georgia	Lagos, Nigeria
C	15	Aly Khalifa	6 ft 11 in (2.11 m)	270 lb (122 kg)	RS Sr	BYU	Alexandria, Egypt
G	24	Chucky Hepburn	6 ft 2 in (1.88 m)	195 lb (88 kg)	Sr	Wisconsin	Omaha, NE
F	25	Aboubacar Traore	6 ft 5 in (1.96 m)	195 lb (88 kg)	Sr	Long Beach State	Abidjan, Ivory Coast
G	33	Aidan McCool (W)	6 ft 3 in (1.91 m)	170 lb (77 kg)	GS	Maryland	Charleston, SC
F	93	Noah Waterman	6 ft 11 in (2.11 m)	220 lb (100 kg)	GS	BYU	Savannah, NY

Head coach

- Pat Kelsey (Xavier)

Assistant coach(es)

- Brian Kloman (Tennessee)
- Ronnie Hamilton (Duke)
- Thomas Carr (Pfeiffer)
- Mike Cassidy (ACPE)
- Jermaine Ukaegbu (Winthrop)

Legend

- (C) Team captain
- (S) Suspended
- (I) Ineligible
- (W) Walk-on
- Injured
- Current redshirt

Roster
Last update: August 1, 2024

== Schedule and results ==
Louisville played two games in the Bahamas in the summer as allowed by the NCAA.

Date time, TV	Rank^{#}	Opponent^{#}	Result	Record	High points	High rebounds	High assists	Site (attendance) city, state
Exhibition
July 30, 2024*; 7:00 p.m., YouTube		Bahamas Select	W 111–59	–	18 – Hadley	7 – Traore	9 – Johnson	Baha Mar (239); Nassau, Bahamas
August 1, 2024*; 12:00 p.m., YouTube		Calgary Dinos	W 111–71	–	20 – Pryor	11 – Rooths	7 – Hepburn	Baha Mar (221); Nassau, Bahamas
October 21, 2024*; 7:00 p.m., ACCNX/ESPN+		Young Harris	W 106–59	–	24 – Edwards	9 – Scott	7 – Johnson	KFC Yum! Center (10,928); Louisville, KY
October 28, 2024*; 7:00 p.m., ACCNX/ESPN+		Spalding	W 99–54	–	26 – Pryor	9 – Scott	8 – Hepburn	KFC Yum! Center (11,556); Louisville, KY
Regular Season
November 4, 2024*; 7:00 p.m., ACCNX/ESPN+		Morehead State	W 93–45	1–0	18 – Pryor	12 – Pryor	4 – Tied	KFC Yum! Center (12,490); Louisville, KY
November 9, 2024*; 12:00 p.m., ACCN		No. 12 Tennessee	L 55–77	1–1	18 – Smith	5 – Smith	4 – Hepburn	KFC Yum! Center (16,976); Louisville, KY
November 19, 2024*; 7:00 p.m., ACCNX/ESPN+		Bellarmine	W 100–68	2–1	26 – Edwards	8 – Scott	5 – Hepburn	KFC Yum! Center (12,220); Louisville, KY
November 22, 2024*; 7:00 p.m., ACCNX/ESPN+		Winthrop	W 76–61	3–1	20 – Smith	13 – Hadley	3 – Tied	KFC Yum! Center (12,462); Louisville, KY
November 27, 2024*; 12:00 p.m., ESPN		vs. No. 14 Indiana; Battle 4 Atlantis quarterfinals	W 89–61	4–1	16 – Tied	8 – Hadley	10 – Hepburn	Imperial Arena (1,594); Paradise Island, Bahamas
November 28, 2024*; 12:00 p.m., ESPN		vs. West Virginia; Battle 4 Atlantis semifinals	W 79–70 ^{OT}	5–1	32 – Hepburn	8 – Pryor	3 – Hadley	Imperial Arena (767); Paradise Island, Bahamas
November 29, 2024*; 5:30 p.m., ESPN		vs. Oklahoma; Battle 4 Atlantis championship	L 64–69	5–2	12 – Tied	13 – Hadley	4 – Tied	Imperial Arena (1,866); Paradise Island, Bahamas
December 3, 2024*; 9:00 p.m., ACCN		No. 23 Ole Miss; ACC–SEC Challenge	L 63–86	5–3	19 – Hepburn	9 – Tied	4 – Hepburn	KFC Yum! Center (12,729); Louisville, KY
December 8, 2024; 6:00 p.m., ACCN		No. 9 Duke	L 65–76	5–4 (0–1)	21 – Edwards Jr.	8 – Tied	5 – Hepburn	KFC Yum! Center (15,312); Louisville, KY
December 11, 2024*; 7:00 p.m., ACCNX/ESPN+		UTEP	W 77–74	6–4	22 – Edwards Jr.	12 – Hadley	7 – Hepburn	KFC Yum! Center (11,668); Louisville, KY
December 14, 2024*; 5:15 p.m., ESPN		at No. 5 Kentucky; Rivalry	L 85–93	6–5	26 – Hepburn	12 – Waterman	5 – Hepburn	Rupp Arena (21,093); Lexington, KY
December 21, 2024; 2:00 p.m, The CW		at Florida State	W 90–76	7–5 (1–1)	27 – Smith	8 – Hadley	8 – Tied	Donald L. Tucker Civic Center (4,383); Tallahassee, FL
December 28, 2024*; 12:00 p.m., The CW		Eastern Kentucky	W 78–76	8–5	20 – Edwards Jr.	10 – Hadley	7 – Hepburn	KFC Yum! Center (13,150); Louisville, KY
January 1, 2025; 6:00 p.m., ACCN		North Carolina	W 83–70	9–5 (2–1)	26 – Hepburn	8 – Scott	7 – Hepburn	KFC Yum! Center (14,248); Louisville, KY
January 4, 2025; 4:00 p.m., ACCN		at Virginia	W 70–50	10–5 (3–1)	15 – Tied	9 – Tied	7 – Hepburn	John Paul Jones Arena (13,316); Charlottesville, VA
January 7, 2025; 7:00 p.m., ESPNU		Clemson	W 74–64	11–5 (4–1)	32 – Hadley	10 – Tied	7 – Hepburn	KFC Yum! Center (14,991); Louisville, KY
January 11, 2025; 12:00 p.m., ESPN2		at Pittsburgh	W 82–78	12–5 (5–1)	25 – Smith	9 – Scott	7 – Hepburn	Petersen Events Center (9,065); Pittsburgh, PA
January 14, 2025; 7:00 p.m., ACCN		at Syracuse	W 85–61	13–5 (6–1)	24 – Hepburn	10 – Hadley	7 – Hepburn	JMA Wireless Dome (19,750); Syracuse, NY
January 18, 2025; 12:00 p.m., ESPN2		Virginia	W 81–67	14–5 (7–1)	19 – Smith	10 – Scott	8 – Hepburn	KFC Yum! Center (18,233); Louisville, KY
January 21, 2025; 9:00 p.m., ACCN	No. 25	at SMU	W 98–73	15–5 (8–1)	30 – Smith	7 – Tied	16 – Hepburn	Moody Coliseum (6,135); University Park, TX
January 28, 2025; 7:00 p.m., ACCN	No. 21	Wake Forest	W 72–59	16–5 (9–1)	18 – Edwards Jr.	8 – Scott	8 – Hepburn	KFC Yum! Center (14,533); Louisville, KY
February 1, 2025; 3:45 p.m., The CW	No. 21	at Georgia Tech	L 70–77	16–6 (9–2)	22 – Edwards Jr.	11 – Scott	5 – Hepburn	McCamish Pavilion (6,147); Atlanta, GA
February 5, 2025; 7:00 p.m., ACCN		at Boston College	W 84–58	17–6 (10–2)	22 – Hadley	11 – Traore	6 – Edwards Jr.	Conte Forum (4,204); Boston, MA
February 8, 2025; 2:00 p.m., ESPN2		Miami	W 88–78	18–6 (11–2)	27 – Edwards Jr.	8 – Traore	10 – Edwards Jr.	KFC Yum! Center (15,588); Louisville, KY
February 12, 2025; 7:00 p.m., ESPN2		at NC State	W 91–66	19–6 (12–2)	21 – Tied	9 – Hadley	6 – Hepburn	Lenovo Center (10,029); Raleigh, NC
February 16, 2025; 8:00 p.m., ACCN		at Notre Dame	W 75–60	20–6 (13–2)	16 – Hepburn	10 – Scott	6 – Hepburn	Joyce Center (5,437); South Bend, IN
February 22, 2025; 12:00 p.m., The CW	No. 25	Florida State	W 89–81	21–6 (14–2)	29 – Hepburn	11 – Hadley	4 – Scott	KFC Yum! Center (16,473); Louisville, KY
February 25, 2025; 9:00 p.m., ACCN	No. 19	at Virginia Tech	W 71–66	22–6 (15–2)	15 – Hepburn	8 – Hadley	6 – Hepburn	Cassell Coliseum (8,925); Blacksburg, VA
March 1, 2025; 6:00 p.m., ESPN2	No. 19	Pittsburgh	W 79–68	23–6 (16–2)	37 – Hepburn	7 – Edwards Jr.	4 – Hepburn	KFC Yum! Center (18,459); Louisville, KY
March 5, 2025; 9:00 p.m., ACCN	No. 14	California	W 85–68	24–6 (17–2)	35 – Edwards Jr.	8 – Hadley	5 – Hepburn	KFC Yum! Center (14,442); Louisville, KY
March 8, 2025; 2:00 p.m., ESPNU	No. 14	Stanford	W 68–48	25–6 (18–2)	16 – Tied	9 – Hadley	4 – Tied	KFC Yum! Center (18,707); Louisville, KY
ACC tournament
March 13, 2025; 7:00 p.m., ESPN2	(2) No. 13	vs. (7) Stanford; Quarterfinals	W 75–73	26–6	25 – Edwards Jr.	9 – Waterman	8 – Hepburn	Spectrum Center (10,627); Charlotte, NC
March 14, 2025; 9:30 p.m., ESPN	(2) No. 13	vs. (3) No. 10 Clemson; Semifinals	W 76–73	27–6	21 – Edwards Jr.	9 – Hadley	5 – Hepburn	Spectrum Center (18,116); Charlotte, NC
March 15, 2025; 8:30 p.m., ESPN	(2) No. 13	vs. (1) No. 1 Duke; Final	L 62–73	27–7	29 – Edwards Jr.	6 – Tied	3 – Tied	Spectrum Center (15,322); Charlotte, NC
NCAA tournament
March 20, 2025; 12:15 p.m., CBS	(8 S) No. 10	vs. (9 S) Creighton; First round	L 75–89	27–8	22 – Hepburn	8 – Hadley	6 – Hepburn	Rupp Arena (18,769); Lexington, KY
*Non-conference game. ^{#}Rankings from AP Poll. (#) Tournament seedings in parentheses. S=South. All times are in Eastern Time.

Schedule Source:

With the additions of Stanford, Cal, and SMU the ACC will have a new scheduling format this season. Louisville will face Boston College, Georgia Tech, NC State, Notre Dame, SMU, Syracuse, and Virginia Tech on the road; Cal, Clemson, Duke, Miami, North Carolina, Stanford, and Wake Forest at home; and Pitt, Virginia and Florida State twice for home and away games.

== Awards and honors ==
Weekly honors
Honors	Player	Position	Date awarded	Ref.
ACC Men's Basketball Player of the Week	Chucky Hepburn	G	December 2, 2024	
ACC Men's Basketball Player of the Week	Reyne Smith	G	December 23, 2024	
ACC Men's Basketball Player of the Week	Terrence Edwards Jr.	G	February 10, 2025	
ACC Men's Basketball Player of the Week	Chucky Hepburn	G	March 3, 2025	

Postseason honors
Honors	Player	Position	Date awarded	Ref.
All-ACC First Team	Chucky Hepburn	G	March 10, 2025	
All-ACC Third Team	Terrence Edwards Jr.	G	March 10, 2025	
ACC Defensive Player of the Year	Chucky Hepburn	G	March 10, 2025	
ACC Coach of the Year	Pat Kelsey	HC	March 10, 2025	
ACC All-Tournament First Team	Terrence Edwards Jr.	G	March 16, 2025	
ACC All-Tournament First Team	Chucky Hepburn	G	March 16, 2025	

== Rankings ==
Ranking movements Legend: ██ Increase in ranking ██ Decrease in ranking — = Not ranked RV = Received votes
	Week																				
Poll	Pre	1	2	3	4	5	6	7	8	9	10	11	12	13	14	15	16	17	18	19	Final
AP	RV	—	—	—	RV	—	—	—	—	—	RV	25	21	RV	RV	25	19	14	13	10	21
Coaches	—	—	—	—	—	—	—	—	—	—	RV	RV	22	RV	RV	22	17	13	13	11	21
