= Bill Guthridge =

American basketball coach (1937–2015)

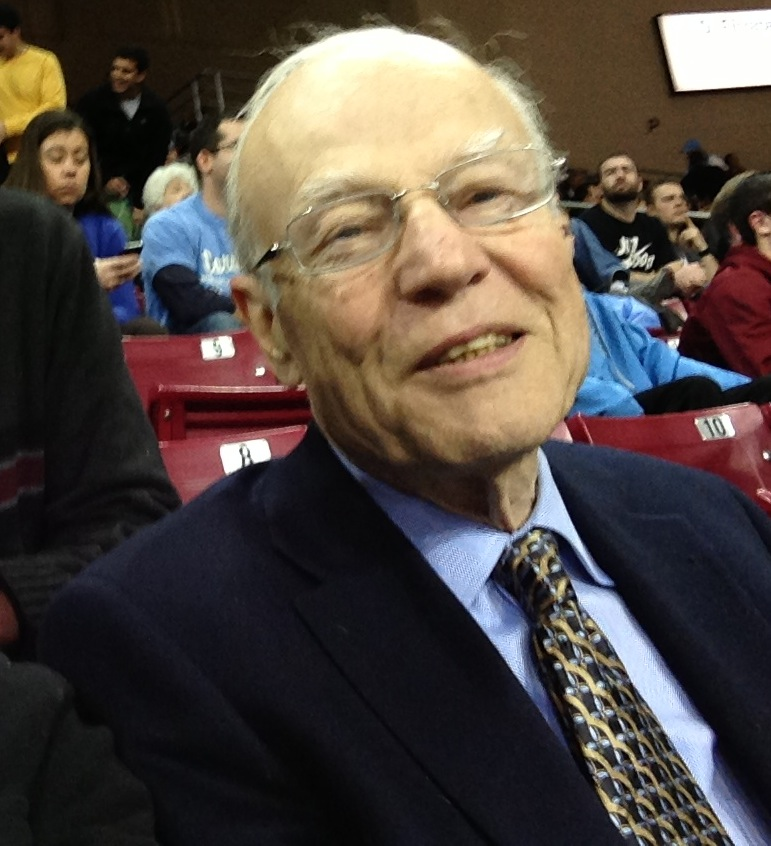
- Guthridge in 2013

Biographical details
- Born: July 27, 1937; Parsons, Kansas, U.S.
- Died: May 12, 2015 (aged 77); Chapel Hill, North Carolina, U.S.

Playing career
- 1956–1957: Parsons JC
- 1957–1960: Kansas State
- Position: Guard

Coaching career (HC unless noted)
- 1960–1962: Scott City HS (KS)
- 1962–1967: Kansas State (assistant)
- 1967–1997: North Carolina (assistant)
- 1997–2000: North Carolina

Head coaching record
- Overall: 80–28 (.741)
- Tournaments: 8–3 (NCAA Division I)

Accomplishments and honors

Championships
- 2 NCAA Regional – Final Four (1998, 2000); ACC tournament (1998)

Awards
- Naismith College Coach of the Year (1998); NABC Coach of the Year (1998); Sporting News Coach of the Year (1998); ACC Coach of the Year (1998)

William Wallace Guthridge (July 27, 1937 – May 12, 2015) was an American college basketball coach. Guthridge initially gained recognition after serving for thirty years as Dean Smith's assistant at the University of North Carolina and summing many wins as a result. Following Smith's retirement in 1997, Guthridge was head coach of the Tar Heels for three seasons. He took the team to the NCAA Final Four twice and was named national coach of the year in 1998, before retiring in 2000.

== Background ==
Born in Parsons, Kansas, Guthridge attended Kansas State University in Manhattan, and graduated with a B.S. in mathematics in 1960 and an M.A. in education in 1963. He was a member of the Pi Kappa Alpha fraternity. While a student at Kansas State, Guthridge played guard under head coach Fred "Tex" Winter, and helped the team advance to the 1958 Final Four. After graduating from Kansas State, he coached at Scott City High School in Kansas for two seasons before returning to his alma mater as an assistant coach for Tex Winter from 1962 to 1967. In five years on Winter's staff, Guthridge helped lead the Wildcats to a 93–43 (.684) record, a pair of Big Eight Conference crowns, and the NCAA Final Four in 1964. He also was head golf coach for the Wildcats.

Following his stint at Kansas State, Guthridge moved to North Carolina to join the staff of fellow Kansas native Dean Smith. From 1972 onward, he was Smith's top assistant. In 1976, he also served as an assistant coach to Smith as the United States won the gold medal in men's basketball at the Summer Olympics in Montreal.

As an assistant, Guthridge was renowned for his success in coaching the fundamentals of pivot play to a long series of successful UNC big men, and as the Tar Heels' primary shooting coach. Guthridge also handled many day-to-day responsibilities in the program and oversaw UNC's summer basketball camps. While serving as an assistant coach, Guthridge turned down several head coaching opportunities, preferring to remain in Chapel Hill working alongside Smith. On one occasion, he actually accepted the head coaching post at Penn State, but stepped down from the post a few days later.

== Head coaching career ==
Dean Smith unexpectedly retired as head basketball coach at North Carolina just two months before the start of the 1997–98 season, and Guthridge was immediately named his successor. School officials stressed that Guthridge was not merely a placeholder for then-Kansas coach Roy Williams, signing him to a five-year contract.

In his three seasons as head coach Guthridge led the Tar Heels to the NCAA final Four twice, in 1998 and again in 2000. He is one of five people to have appeared in the Final Four as both a player and coach. In 1998, Guthridge inherited a team that had been to the 1997 Final Four the previous year under Smith. With a wealth of returning talent, Guthridge instituted a "six starters" system, whereby the team's top six players, Antawn Jamison, Vince Carter, Ed Cota, Shammond Williams, Ademola Okulaja, and Makhtar N'Diaye rotated positions in the starting five. Guthridge coached that team to the Atlantic Coast Conference tournament championship, a school record-tying 34 wins (including 30 wins going into the NCAA Tournament – the most in school history at the time) and an appearance in the Final Four, where they lost to Utah. Following the 1997–98 season, several organizations named him National Coach of the Year and he received the Naismith College Coach of the Year award.

The next season, North Carolina earned a #3 seed in the West regional of the NCAA tournament, but was upset in the first round by Weber State in a late game in Seattle. Before their first-round exit in 2021, this was the only time that the Tar Heels failed to win a game in the tournament since it expanded to 64 teams (and dropped first-round byes) in 1985.

In 2000, the Tar Heels struggled in the regular season, falling out of the polls for the first time since the start of the 1990–91 season. At the time, their run of 172 consecutive weeks in the AP Poll was the second-longest in college basketball history. They finished the regular season at 18–13, the worst for UNC in eleven years, but the Tar Heels came alive in the NCAA tournament. Seeded eighth in the South region, North Carolina upset top-seeded Stanford in the second round and continued to the Final Four, where they lost to Florida. Guthridge retired after the season, having spent the first 43 years of his adult life as a player, high school coach, and college coach.

Guthridge was involved in a total of fourteen Final Fours as either a player or coach, more than any other person in history—one each as a player and assistant at Kansas State, ten as a North Carolina assistant, and two as North Carolina head coach.

He died at his home on May 12, 2015, after an extended illness, alongside his family.

== Head coaching record ==
Record table
Season	Team	Overall	Conference	Standing	Postseason
North Carolina Tar Heels (Atlantic Coast Conference) (1997–2000)
1997–98	North Carolina	34–4	13–3	2nd	NCAA Division I Final Four
1998–99	North Carolina	24–10	10–6	3rd	NCAA Division I First Round
1999–00	North Carolina	22–14	9–7	T–3rd	NCAA Division I Final Four
North Carolina:		80–28 (.741)	32–16 (.667)		
Total:		80–28 (.741)			
National champion Postseason invitational champion Conference regular season champion Conference regular season and conference tournament champion Division regular season champion Division regular season and conference tournament champion Conference tournament champion

== See also ==
- List of NCAA Division I men's basketball tournament Final Four appearances by coach
