= Ed Cota =

Panamanian-American basketball player

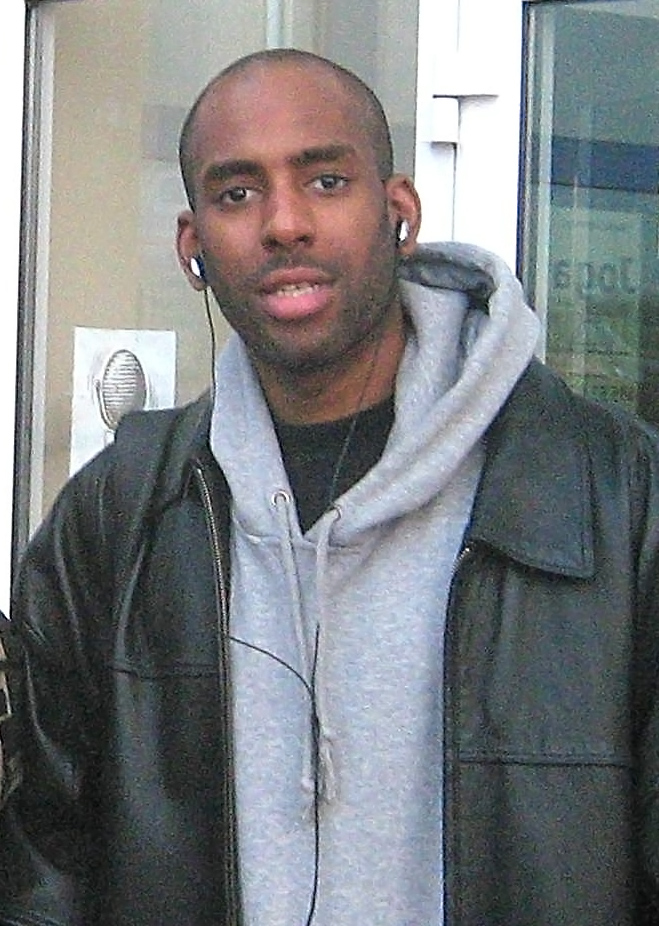

Personal information
- Born: May 19, 1976 (age 50) Los Angeles, California, U.S.
- Listed height: 6 ft 0 in (1.83 m)
- Listed weight: 195 lb (88 kg)

Career information
- High school: Samuel J. Tilden (Brooklyn, New York)
- College: North Carolina (1996–2000)
- NBA draft: 2000: undrafted
- Playing career: 2000–2008
- Position: Point guard

Career history
- 2000–2001: Gary Steelheads
- 2001–2002: Telindus Oostende
- 2002–2004: Žalgiris Kaunas
- 2004–2005: BC Dynamo Saint Petersburg
- 2005–2006: Žalgiris Kaunas
- 2006: Barcelona
- 2006–2007: Hapoel Jerusalem
- 2007–2008: Stal Ostrów Wielkopolski

Career highlights
- FIBA Europe League All-Star (2005); Lithuanian Basketball League All-Star (2004); 2× EuroLeague assists leader (2003, 2004); 3× Second-team All-ACC (1998–2000); ACC Rookie of the Year (1997); ACC All-Freshman Team (1997); Second-team Parade All-American (1996); McDonald's All-American (1996)
Medals
Men's basketball
Representing Panama
Centrobasket
Gold medal – first place	2006 Panama	Team

Eduardo Enrique Cota (born May 19, 1976) is a Panamanian-American former professional basketball player.

== High school career ==
Cota played his freshman and sophomore years at Brooklyn, New York's Samuel J. Tilden High School. As a sophomore, he averaged 31.5 points, 11 assists and six steals per game and led his team to the semifinals of the New York Public School Athletic League.

Cota underwent a devastating family tragedy in the ninth grade when his parents were in a car accident in Panama that would hospitalize them for several years. His mother spent a year in the hospital, his stepfather spent two and left in a wheelchair, never to regain use of his legs. He struggled to stay on track in school but was helped by the return of his mother and help from his high school coach Eric Eisenberg to get him counseling and find a prep school to attend to get a fresh start.

He then enrolled in St. Thomas More School in Oakdale, Connecticut, where he led his team to the New England private school title his junior year as he averaged 21 points and nine assists a game. He was selected for the United States Junior National Select Team and played in the 1996 McDonald's All-American Game, which featured future stars Jermaine O'Neal, Stephen Jackson, Mike Bibby and Kobe Bryant. The one-time truant high school student also excelled in the classroom, eventually finishing his high school career as an honor-roll student.

== Collegiate career ==
Cota is probably best known to basketball fans for his play at point guard for the University of North Carolina (UNC) from 1996 to 2000. At UNC, Cota led the Tar Heels to three Final Fours in his four years as a starter. During the 1997–1998 season, Cota was a member of new coach Bill Guthridge's successful "Six Starters" rotation with Antawn Jamison, Vince Carter, Shammond Williams, Ademola Okulaja, and Makhtar N'Diaye.

Cota garnered many accolades during his college career. He was named the 1997 ACC Rookie of the Year and a 1997 Freshman All-America. Cota was the leading vote-getter on the 1997 All-ACC Freshman Team. He earned 2nd-Team All-Conference honors three years in a row, as a sophomore (1998), junior (1999) and senior (2000). As a sophomore, he broke the ACC record for most assists in a single season. He was named a 1999 AP All-America Team Honorable Mention. He earned three NCAA All-Regional Team selections as a senior while leading UNC to another Final Four. By the time his college career concluded, he had become the first player in NCAA basketball history to score 1,000 points, and have 1,000 assists and 500 rebounds in a career. Additionally, he finished with the third highest assist total in NCAA history, and owns the record for most assists in a career at Carolina. Remarkably, Cota also played an NCAA record 138 games without ever fouling out.

== Professional career ==
Cota was not drafted by the NBA after graduating from North Carolina. His lack of height (6' 0") and jump shot were cited as a major impediments to success as a pro. Instead, he was drafted by the Gary Steelheads of the minor league Continental Basketball Association, where he spent the 2000–2001 season. That season Cota proved his doubters wrong, leading the league in 3-point shooting with a 48.5% mark.

After that season, Cota left the CBA and began what would become a very successful basketball career in Europe. He signed with the Belgian pro team Telindus BC Oostende for the 2001–2002 season. They went on to win the 2001–2002 Belgian National Championship. Cota joined Žalgiris Kaunas, a Lithuanian team, for the 2002–2003 and 2003–2004 seasons, during which he consecutively led the Euroleague in assists. Cota's team won the Lithuanian National Championship both season. Cota also played in the 2004 Lithuanian All-Star Game.

Cota joined BC Dynamo Saint Petersburg, a member of the Russian Basketball Super League that competes as a member of FIBA Europe, in 2004–2005. It was the club's first year of existence. The Dynamo went undefeated in the FIBA Europe League that season and won the championship. Cota played in the 2005 FIBA Europe League All-Star Game.

After his stint in St. Petersburg, Cota returned to Lithuania and Žalgiris Kaunas to start the 2005–2006 season, but moved to Spain to play for FC Barcelona before the season ended.

Despite his success overseas, Cota continued to work toward the goal of playing in the NBA. Over the years, he played on the NBA Summer League squads of the Los Angeles Clippers, Indiana Pacers, and Washington Wizards.

Cota competed internationally with the Panama men's national basketball team (his parents were from Panama and he maintains dual citizenship status) at the 2006 FIBA World Championship tournament.

Cota signed with Israeli side Hapoel Jerusalem for the 2006–7 season. In January 2008 he joined Atlas Stal Ostrów Wielkopolski playing in Polish Dominet Bank Ekstraliga.

== See also ==
- List of NCAA Division I men's basketball career assists leaders

== Career statistics ==
Legend
GP	Games played	GS	Games started	MPG	Minutes per game
FG%	Field-goal percentage	3P%	3-point field-goal percentage	FT%	Free-throw percentage
RPG	Rebounds per game	APG	Assists per game	SPG	Steals per game
BPG	Blocks per game	PPG	Points per game	PIR	Performance index rating
**Bold**	Career high

Led the league

=== Euroleague ===
Year	Team	GP	GS	MPG	FG%	3P%	FT%	RPG	APG	SPG	BPG	PPG	PIR
2001–02	Telindus Oostende	8	7	32.0	.550	.281	.649	2.9	5.1	1.5	.1	14.6	14.0
2002–03	Zalgiris	14	14	35.5	.508	.208	.784	4.6	6.5	1.2	.1	12.1	16.5
2003–04	Zalgiris	20	19	36.2	.513	.465	.754	3.6	5.7	1.6	.1	13.4	16.2
2005–06	Barcelona	20	10	20.0	.423	.211	.667	2.8	2.6	.7	.1	3.3	5.0
