= Ademola Okulaja =

German basketball player (1975–2022)

- Okulaja with the German national team

Personal information
- Born: 10 July 1975 Lagos, Nigeria
- Died: 17 May 2022 (aged 46) Berlin, Germany
- Listed height: 2.06 m (6 ft 9 in)
- Listed weight: 107 kg (236 lb)

Career information
- College: North Carolina (1995–1999)
- NBA draft: 1999: undrafted
- Playing career: 1999–2009
- Position: Power forward

Career history
- 1999–2000: ALBA Berlin
- 2000–2001: Girona
- 2001–2002: FC Barcelona
- 2002–2003: Unicaja Málaga
- 2003–2004: Girona
- 2004: Benetton Treviso
- 2004–2005: Pamesa Valencia
- 2005–2006: RheinEnergie Köln
- 2006–2007: Khimki Moscow
- 2007: Etosa Alicante
- 2007–2009: Brose Baskets

Career highlights
- EuroBasket rebounding leader (2003); First-team All-ACC (1999)
- Stats at Basketball Reference

Ademola Okulaja (10 July 1975 – 17 May 2022) was a German professional basketball player. The last team he played for were the Brose Baskets of the Basketball Bundesliga. After his playing career, he became an agent for NBA player Dennis Schröder.

A 2.06 m (6 ft 9 in) forward, Okulaja received 172 caps for the German national team, serving as a team captain for many years and winning bronze at the 2002 World Championships. He played college basketball in the United States at North Carolina and flirted briefly with the NBA before moving on to a successful career in Europe.

== Early life ==
The son of a German mother and a Nigerian father, Okulaja was born in Nigeria but moved to Berlin with his family at the age of three. In 1995, he graduated from John F. Kennedy School in Berlin, before enrolling at the University of North Carolina.

== Collegiate career ==
Okulaja played college basketball at North Carolina from 1995 to 1999. During the 1997–98 NCAA season, he was a member of new coach Bill Guthridge's successful "six starters" rotation with Antawn Jamison, Vince Carter, Ed Cota, Shammond Williams and Makhtar N'Diaye. In his senior season, he was named MVP of the Tar Heels basketball team and won a spot on the 1998–99 All-Atlantic Coast Conference First Team. Okulaja was the first player in the history of UNC basketball who led the squad in scoring, rebounding, three-pointers made and steals.

== Professional career ==
Okulaja played professionally for a variety of Euroleague teams, including ALBA Berlin in the 1994–95 season winning the FIBA Korać Cup and again in 1999–00, and later RheinEnergie Köln (2006–07) in Germany; CB Girona (2000–01 and 2003–04), Barcelona (2001–02), Unicaja Malaga (2002–03) and Pamesa Valencia (2004–05) in Spain; and Benetton Treviso in Italy (2004). His ALBA Berlin team won the 1999–00 German national (Bundesliga) championship. He won the "Rookie of the Year" award with Girona and was an All-League First Team selection that year. In 2002, he won the award for "Most Spectacular Player" at the Spanish All-Star Game.

Okulaja had three different attempts to join the NBA; his first training camp experience was with the Philadelphia 76ers, then with the San Antonio Spurs and finally the Utah Jazz, but was unable to make an NBA roster.

In 2008, Okulaja was diagnosed with a spinal tumor and had to go into a one-year therapy. After it proved to be successful, he played one more season for the Brose Baskets.

In July 2010, he announced his retirement from professional basketball.

=== German national team ===
Okulaja was also team captain of the Germany national team and one of the key figures of the team, alongside Dirk Nowitzki and Patrick Femerling. He played with the team at the European Championships in 1995, 1997, 1999 and 2001. He competed with the German national team at the 2002 FIBA World Basketball Championship in the US, winning bronze, and in Japan at the 2006 FIBA World Basketball Championship.

== Post-playing career ==
Okulaja worked as analyst and commentator at Sport1, a German sports channel.

He founded Pro4Pros, a sports consulting company, and then became director of the German office of Octagon, a sports and entertainment company.

Okulaja died on 17 May 2022 in Berlin. He is survived by his life partner Bintia Bangura and children.
