= 1997–98 Florida State Seminoles men's basketball team =

American college basketball season

1997–98 Florida State Seminoles men's basketball

NCAA tournament, second round
- Conference: Atlantic Coast Conference
- Record: 18–14 (6–10 ACC)
- Head coach: Steve Robinson (1st season)
- Assistant coaches: Coleman Crawford (1st season); Jim Platt (1st season); Matt Wingate (1st season)
- Home arena: Donald L. Tucker Center

1997–98 ACC men's basketball standings
	Conf.				Overall
Team	W		L	PCT	W		L	PCT
No. 3 Duke	15	–	1	.938	32	–	4	.889
No. 1 North Carolina†	13	–	3	.813	34	–	4	.895
No. 20 Maryland	10	–	6	.625	21	–	11	.656
Wake Forest	7	–	9	.438	16	–	14	.533
Clemson	7	–	9	.438	18	–	14	.563
Georgia Tech	6	–	10	.375	19	–	14	.576
Florida State	6	–	10	.375	18	–	4	.818
NC State	5	–	11	.313	17	–	15	.531
Virginia	3	–	13	.188	11	–	19	.367
† 1998 ACC tournament winner Rankings from AP poll

The 1997–98 Florida State Seminoles men's basketball team represented Florida State University as members of the Atlantic Coast Conference during the 1997–98 NCAA Division I men's basketball season. The Seminoles head coach was Steve Robinson.

Florida State reached the NCAA tournament as the No. 12 seed in the Midwest region. After knocking off No. 5 seed TCU in the opening round, Florida State was beaten by No. 13 seed Valparaiso, 83–77 in overtime. The team finished with an overall record of 18–14 (6–10 ACC).

== Roster ==
1997–98 Florida State Seminoles men's basketball team
Players
Coaches

Pos.	#	Name	Height	Weight	Year	Previous school	Hometown
C	3	Karim Shabazz	7 ft 2 in (2.18 m)	225 lb (102 kg)	Fr	Lawrence Woodmere Academy	Far Rockaway, New York
G	5	Adrian Crawford	6 ft 5 in (1.96 m)	200 lb (91 kg)	So	Barberton; Tulsa	Akron, Ohio
G	10	Delvon Arrington	5 ft 11 in (1.8 m)	180 lb (82 kg)	Fr	St. Anthony	Jersey City, New Jersey
G	12	Matt Chlebek	6 ft 0 in (1.83 m)	165 lb (75 kg)	Fr	Barron G. Collier	Naples, Florida
G	12	Kerry Thompson	6 ft 0 in (1.83 m)	195 lb (88 kg)	Sr	Walton; Tallahassee CC	New York, New York
F/C	14	Randell Jackson	6 ft 11 in (2.11 m)	210 lb (95 kg)	Jr	The Winchendon School	Boston, Massachusetts
F	15	Kyle Mulligan	6 ft 10 in (2.08 m)	210 lb (95 kg)	Sr	Marjory Stoneman Douglas	Coral Springs, Florida
G/F	20	LaMarr Greer	6 ft 5 in (1.96 m)	225 lb (102 kg)	Sr	Middle Township	Cape May, New Jersey
F	21	Ron Hale	6 ft 8 in (2.03 m)	210 lb (95 kg)	So	Largo	Largo, Florida
G	22	Devonaire Deas	6 ft 5 in (1.96 m)	200 lb (91 kg)	So	St. Thomas More	Albany, New York
G	23	Alton Sheffield	6 ft 5 in (1.96 m)	200 lb (91 kg)	Jr		Boynton Beach, Florida
G	23	Marcel Thomas	6 ft 5 in (1.96 m)	190 lb (86 kg)	Jr		Jacksonville, Florida
G/F	24	Terrell Baker	6 ft 6 in (1.98 m)	200 lb (91 kg)	Jr	Camden County Tech; Champlain JC	Lawnside, New Jersey
F	30	Gibson Pierre	6 ft 5 in (1.96 m)	195 lb (88 kg)	Jr	Edison	Miami, Florida
F	31	Ronald Thompson	6 ft 7 in (2.01 m)	210 lb (95 kg)	RS Fr	Jenkins	Savannah, Georgia
G/F	41	Geoff Brower	6 ft 5 in (1.96 m)	215 lb (98 kg)	RS Jr	Fort Walton Beach	Fort Walton Beach, Florida
F	51	Oliver Simmons	6 ft 8 in (2.03 m)	225 lb (102 kg)	RS Jr	David Lipscomb; Kentucky	Nashville, Tennessee
F/C	52	Corey Louis	6 ft 9 in (2.06 m)	235 lb (107 kg)	Sr	Northwestern	Miami, Florida

Head coach

- Steve Robinson (Radford)

Assistant coach(es)

- Coleman Crawford (North Alabama)
- Jim Platt (Concordia (IL)
- Matt Wingate (Kansas)

Legend

- (C) Team captain
- (S) Suspended
- (I) Ineligible
- (W) Walk-on
- Injured
- Current redshirt

== Schedule and results ==
Date time, TV	Rank^{#}	Opponent^{#}	Result	Record	Site city, state
Regular Season
Nov 14, 1997*		at Rice	W 65–53	1–0	Tudor Fieldhouse; Houston, Texas
Nov 17, 1997*		Loyola (MD)	W 89–72	2–0	Donald L. Tucker Center; Tallahassee, Florida
Nov 19, 1997*		Utah State	W 66–55	3–0	Donald L. Tucker Center; Tallahassee, Florida
Nov 27, 1997*		vs. No. 11 Connecticut; Preseason NIT	W 67–60	4–0	Madison Square Garden; New York, New York
Nov 28, 1997*		vs. No. 2 Kansas; Preseason NIT	L 58–73	4–1	Madison Square Garden; New York, New York
Dec 2, 1997*	No. 19	Florida Atlantic	W 90–52	5–1	Donald L. Tucker Center; Tallahassee, Florida
Dec 6, 1997*	No. 19	Jacksonville	W 74–44	6–1	Donald L. Tucker Center; Tallahassee, Florida
Dec 14, 1997*	No. 16	vs. Florida; Milk Challenge	W 83–81	7–1	Orlando Arena; Orlando, Florida
Dec 17, 1997*	No. 17	UNC Asheville	W 77–60	8–1	Donald L. Tucker Center; Tallahassee, Florida
Dec 20, 1997	No. 17	No. 1 North Carolina	L 73–81	8–2 (0–1)	Donald L. Tucker Center; Tallahassee, Florida
Dec 23, 1997*	No. 17	No. 5 Arizona	W 84–79	9–2	Donald L. Tucker Center; Tallahassee, Florida
Dec 29, 1997*	No. 15	at Louisiana-Lafayette	W 80–71	10–2	Cajundome; Lafayette, Louisiana
Dec 31, 1997*	No. 15	at DePaul	W 66–55	11–2	Rosemont Horizon; Rosemont, Illinois
Jan 3, 1998	No. 15	NC State	W 68–55	12–2 (1–1)	Donald L. Tucker Center; Tallahassee, Florida
Jan 7, 1998	No. 13	at Maryland	L 74–81	12–3 (1–2)	Cole Fieldhouse; College Park, Maryland
Jan 10, 1998	No. 13	No. 2 Duke	L 63–75	12–4 (1–3)	Donald L. Tucker Center; Tallahassee, Florida
Jan 13, 1998	No. 17	at Clemson	L 65–86	12–5 (1–4)	Littlejohn Coliseum; Clemson, South Carolina
Jan 18, 1998	No. 17	at Georgia Tech	W 70–67	13–5 (2–4)	Alexander Memorial Coliseum; Atlanta, Georgia
Jan 22, 1998	No. 20	Wake Forest	W 83–59	14–5 (3–4)	Donald L. Tucker Center; Tallahassee, Florida
Jan 24, 1998	No. 20	at No. 2 North Carolina	L 55–103	14–6 (3–5)	Dean Smith Center; Chapel Hill, North Carolina
Jan 28, 1998		at NC State	W 64–52	15–6 (4–5)	Reynolds Coliseum; Raleigh, North Carolina
Jan 31, 1998*		at South Florida	L 68–70	15–7	Sun Dome; Tampa, Florida
Feb 4, 1998; 7:30 p.m.		at Virginia	W 71–63	16–7 (5–5)	University Hall (6,250); Charlottesville, Virginia
Feb 7, 1998		No. 25 Maryland	L 62–68	16–8 (5–6)	Donald L. Tucker Center; Tallahassee, Florida
Feb 10, 1998		at No. 2 Duke	L 72–86	16–9 (5–7)	Cameron Indoor Stadium; Durham, North Carolina
Feb 15, 1998		Clemson	L 49–78	16–10 (5–8)	Donald L. Tucker Center; Tallahassee, Florida
Feb 18, 1998		Georgia Tech	L 59–72	16–11 (5–9)	Donald L. Tucker Center; Tallahassee, Florida
Feb 21, 1998		at Wake Forest	L 68–69	16–12 (5–10)	Lawrence Joel Coliseum; Winston-Salem, North Carolina
Feb 28, 1998; 12:00 a.m.		Virginia	W 88–63	17–12 (6–10)	Donald L. Tucker Center (6,657); Tallahassee, Florida
ACC Tournament
Mar 5, 1998*	(7)	at (8) NC State; Quarterfinals	L 63–65	17–13	Greensboro Coliseum; Greensboro, North Carolina
NCAA Tournament
Mar 13, 1998*	(12 MW)	vs. (5 MW) No. 15 TCU; First Round	W 96–87	18–13	Myriad Convention Center; Oklahoma City, OK
Mar 15, 1998*	(12 MW)	vs. (13 MW) Valparaiso; Second Round	L 77–83 ^{OT}	18–14	Myriad Convention Center; Oklahoma City, OK
*Non-conference game. ^{#}Rankings from AP. (#) Tournament seedings in parentheses. MW=Midwest. All times are in Eastern Time.
