= 1997–98 Virginia Cavaliers men's basketball team =

American college basketball season

1997–98 Virginia Cavaliers men's basketball
- Conference: Atlantic Coast Conference
- Record: 11–19 (3–13 ACC)
- Head coach: Jeff Jones (8th season)
- Assistant coaches: Anthony Solomon (4th season); Ricky Stokes (1st season); Pete Herrmann (4th season)
- Home arena: University Hall

1997–98 ACC men's basketball standings
	Conf.				Overall
Team	W		L	PCT	W		L	PCT
No. 3 Duke	15	–	1	.938	32	–	4	.889
No. 1 North Carolina†	13	–	3	.813	34	–	4	.895
No. 20 Maryland	10	–	6	.625	21	–	11	.656
Wake Forest	7	–	9	.438	16	–	14	.533
Clemson	7	–	9	.438	18	–	14	.563
Georgia Tech	6	–	10	.375	19	–	14	.576
Florida State	6	–	10	.375	18	–	4	.818
NC State	5	–	11	.313	17	–	15	.531
Virginia	3	–	13	.188	11	–	19	.367
† 1998 ACC tournament winner Rankings from AP poll

The 1997–98 Virginia Cavaliers men's basketball team represented the University of Virginia during the 1997–98 NCAA Division I men's basketball season. The team was led by eighth-year head coach Jeff Jones, and played their home games at University Hall in Charlottesville, Virginia as members of the Atlantic Coast Conference. At the end of the season, Jones resigned as head coach; he would be replaced by Providence Friars head coach Pete Gillen.

== Last season ==
The Cavaliers had a record of 18–13, with a conference record of 7–9. They reached the first round of the 1997 NCAA Men's Division I Basketball Tournament as a #9 seed, where they lost to #8 seed Iowa.

== Roster ==
1997–98 Virginia Cavaliers men's basketball team
Players
Coaches

Pos.	#	Name	Height	Weight	Year	Hometown
G	5	Curtis Staples (C)	6 ft 3 in (1.91 m)	198 lb (90 kg)	Sr	Roanoke, Virginia
G	10	Chezley Watson	6 ft 2 in (1.88 m)	201 lb (91 kg)	Fr	Gainesville, Georgia
G	11	Greg Lyons	6 ft 4 in (1.93 m)	187 lb (85 kg)	Fr	Mineola, New York
G	13	Donald Hand	5 ft 11 in (1.8 m)	192 lb (87 kg)	Fr	Paterson, New Jersey
G	15	Peter McLaughlin (C)	6 ft 2 in (1.88 m)	170 lb (77 kg)	Sr	Maplewood, New Jersey
G/F	24	Willie Dersch	6 ft 5 in (1.96 m)	210 lb (95 kg)	So	Floral Park, New York
F	25	Norman Nolan (C)	6 ft 8 in (2.03 m)	253 lb (115 kg)	Sr	Baltimore
G	31	Mike Curtis (C)	6 ft 3 in (1.91 m)	191 lb (87 kg)	Sr	Richmond, Virginia
G	33	Monte Marcaccini	6 ft 5 in (1.96 m)	204 lb (93 kg)	So	Tarzana, California
G/F	42	Chase Metheny	7 ft 4 in (2.24 m)	251 lb (114 kg)	Jr	Charlotte, North Carolina
C	44	Kris Hunter	6 ft 11 in (2.11 m)	230 lb (104 kg)	So	Tallahassee, Florida
F/C	52	Colin Ducharme	6 ft 9 in (2.06 m)	243 lb (110 kg)	So	Richmond, Virginia
F/C	54	Craig McAndrew	6 ft 10 in (2.08 m)	248 lb (112 kg)	So	Wonga Beach, Queensland

Head coach

- Jeff Jones (Virginia)

Assistant coach(es)

- Anthony Solomon (Virginia)
- Ricky Stokes (Virginia)
- Pete Hermann (SUNY Geneseo)

Legend

- (C) Team captain
- (S) Suspended
- (I) Ineligible
- (W) Walk-on
- Injured
- Current redshirt

Roster
Last update: March 5, 2015

== Schedule ==
Date time, TV	Opponent	Result	Record	Site (attendance) city, state
Exhibition game
Nov. 5*; 7:30 pm	Court Authority	W 74–72		University Hall; Charlottesville, Virginia
Nov. 9*; 2:00 pm	Australia	L 59–70		University Hall (1,899); Charlottesville, Virginia
Regular season
Nov. 16*; 7:00 pm	at Richmond; NationsBank Virginia Challenge	L 79–83 ^{2OT}	0–1	Robins Center (8,463); Richmond, Virginia
Nov. 19*; 7:30 pm	William & Mary	W 59–45	1–1	University Hall (5,864); Charlottesville, Virginia
Nov. 22*; 1:00 pm	George Mason	W 60–45	2–1	University Hall (2,163); Charlottesville, Virginia
Nov. 25*; 7:30 pm	at Delaware	W 64–57	3–1	Bob Carpenter Center (4,353); Newark, Delaware
Dec. 2*; 7:30 pm	Appalachian State	W 62–54	4–1	University Hall (5,677); Charlottesville, Virginia
Dec. 6; 2:00 pm	at No. 1 Duke	L 59–103	4–2 (0–1)	Cameron Indoor Stadium (9,314); Durham, North Carolina
Dec. 10*; 7:30 pm	No. 13 Connecticut	L 63–74	4–3 (0–1)	University Hall (6,841); Charlottesville, Virginia
Dec. 13*; 7:30 pm	vs. VCU; NationsBank Virginia Challenge	W 73–67	5–3 (0–1)	Robins Center (7,700); Richmond, Virginia
Dec. 22*; 7:30 pm	VMI	W 92–55	6–3 (0–1)	University Hall (4,108); Charlottesville, Virginia
Dec. 27*; 10:30 pm	vs. Nebraska; Rainbow Classic	L 65–80	6–4 (0–1)	Special Events Arena; Honolulu, HI
Dec. 29*; 4:00 pm	vs. BYU; Rainbow Classic	W 72–54	7–4 (0–1)	Special Events Arena; Honolulu, HI
Dec. 30*; 6:30 pm	vs. New Mexico State; Rainbow Classic	L 82–87 ^{OT}	7–5 (0–1)	Special Events Arena; Honolulu, HI
Jan. 4; 1:00 pm	vs. Wake Forest; NationsBank Virginia Challenge	W 73–64 ^{OT}	8–5 (1–1)	Robins Center (7,556); Richmond, Virginia
Jan. 7*; 7:30 pm	Liberty	L 64–69	8–6 (1–1)	University Hall (3,405); Charlottesville, Virginia
Jan. 10; 1:30 pm	at No. 1 North Carolina	L 73–81	8–7 (1–2)	Dean Smith Center (21,572); Chapel Hill, North Carolina
Jan. 12*; 7:00 pm	vs. Virginia Tech	W 69–55	9–7 (1–2)	Roanoke Civic Center (6,454); Roanoke, Virginia
Jan. 15; 8:00 pm	Georgia Tech	L 65–83	9–8 (1–3)	University Hall (8,337); Charlottesville, Virginia
Jan. 18; 1:30 pm	NC State	W 59–56	10–8 (2–3)	University Hall (7,596); Charlottesville, Virginia
Jan. 20; 8:00 pm	at No. 25 Clemson	L 52–69	10–9 (2–4)	Littlejohn Coliseum (11,020); Clemson, South Carolina
Jan. 24; Noon	No. 1 Duke	L 65–72	10–10 (2–5)	University Hall (8,019); Charlottesville, Virginia
Jan. 27; 8:00 pm	at Wake Forest	L 55–62	10–11 (2–6)	Joel Coliseum (13,505); Winston-Salem, North Carolina
Feb. 1; 4:00 pm	at No. 25 Maryland	L 70–77	10–12 (2–7)	Cole Field House (14,500); College Park, Maryland
Feb. 4; 7:30 pm	Florida State	L 63–71	10–13 (2–8)	University Hall (6,250); Charlottesville, Virginia
Feb. 11; 9:00 pm	No. 1 North Carolina	L 45–60	10–14 (2–9)	University Hall (8,047); Charlottesville, Virginia
Feb. 14; Noon	at Georgia Tech	L 86–105	10–15 (2–10)	Alexander Memorial Coliseum (7,826); Atlanta
Feb. 18; 7:00 pm	at NC State	L 55–74	10–16 (2–11)	Reynolds Coliseum (11,710); Raleigh, North Carolina
Feb. 21; 1:30 pm	Clemson	W 78–74 ^{OT}	11–16 (3–11)	University Hall (7,707); Charlottesville, Virginia
Feb. 24; 9:00 pm	Maryland	L 66–74	11–17 (3–12)	University Hall (7,515); Charlottesville, Virginia
Feb. 28; 12:00 am	at Florida State	L 63–88	11–18 (3–13)	Tallahassee-Leon County Civic Center (6,657); Tallahassee, Florida
ACC Tournament
Mar. 5	vs. No. 1 Duke; ACC Tournament first round	L 41–63	11–19	Greensboro Coliseum (23,733); Greensboro, North Carolina
*Non-conference game. (#) Tournament seedings in parentheses. All times are in Eastern Time.
