= 1997–98 Maryland Terrapins men's basketball team =

American college basketball season

1997–98 Maryland Terrapins men's basketball

NCAA tournament, Sweet Sixteen
- Conference: Atlantic Coast Conference

Ranking
- Coaches: No. 15
- AP: No. 20
- Record: 21–11 (10–6 ACC)
- Head coach: Gary Williams (9th season)
- Assistant coach: Billy Hahn; Dave Dickerson; Jimmy Patsos; Troy Wainwright
- Home arena: Cole Field House

1997–98 ACC men's basketball standings
	Conf.				Overall
Team	W		L	PCT	W		L	PCT
No. 3 Duke	15	–	1	.938	32	–	4	.889
No. 1 North Carolina†	13	–	3	.813	34	–	4	.895
No. 20 Maryland	10	–	6	.625	21	–	11	.656
Wake Forest	7	–	9	.438	16	–	14	.533
Clemson	7	–	9	.438	18	–	14	.563
Georgia Tech	6	–	10	.375	19	–	14	.576
Florida State	6	–	10	.375	18	–	4	.818
NC State	5	–	11	.313	17	–	15	.531
Virginia	3	–	13	.188	11	–	19	.367
† 1998 ACC tournament winner Rankings from AP poll

The 1997–98 Maryland Terrapins men's basketball team represented the University of Maryland in the 1997–1998 college basketball season as a member of the Atlantic Coast Conference (ACC). The team was led by head coach Gary Williams and played their home games at the Cole Field House. The team finished 21–11, 10–6 in ACC play and lost in the semifinals of the ACC tournament to UNC. They received an at-large bid as a number 4 seed in the 1998 NCAA tournament, where they lost to Arizona in the Sweet Sixteen.

== Roster ==
1997–98 Maryland Terrapins men's basketball team
Players
Coaches

Pos.	#	Name	Height	Weight	Year	Hometown
G/F	3	Laron Profit	6 ft 5 in (1.96 m)	202 lb (92 kg)	Jr	Charleston, South Carolina
G	12	Terrell Stokes	6 ft 0 in (1.83 m)	187 lb (85 kg)	Jr	Philadelphia
G	13	Šarūnas Jasikevičius	6 ft 3 in (1.91 m)	200 lb (91 kg)	Sr
G	20	Matt Hahn	6 ft 0 in (1.83 m)	162 lb (73 kg)	So	Columbia, Maryland
F	21	LaRon Cephas	6 ft 7 in (2.01 m)	223 lb (101 kg)	Fr	Wilmington, Delaware
G	31	Norman Fields	6 ft 0 in (1.83 m)	185 lb (84 kg)	Jr	Mt. Vernon, New York
F/C	33	Mike Mardesich	7 ft 0 in (2.13 m)	255 lb (116 kg)	Fr	Boston, Massachusetts
F	44	Terence Morris	6 ft 9 in (2.06 m)	205 lb (93 kg)	Fr	Frederick, Maryland
F/C	45	Brian Watkins	6 ft 9 in (2.06 m)	229 lb (104 kg)	Jr	Nashville, Tennessee
F/C	54	Obinna Ekezie	6 ft 10 in (2.08 m)	262 lb (119 kg)	Jr	Port Harcourt, Nigeria

Head coach

- Gary Williams (Maryland)

Assistant coach(es)

- Billy Hahn (Maryland)
- Dave Dickerson (Maryland)
- Jimmy Patsos (Catholic)
- Troy Wainwright (Maryland)

Legend

- (C) Team captain
- (S) Suspended
- (I) Ineligible
- (W) Walk-on
- Injured
- Current redshirt

Roster
Last update: 2021-06-26

== Schedule and results ==
Date time, TV	Rank^{#}	Opponent^{#}	Result	Record	Site (attendance) city, state
Regular season
Nov 14, 1997*		vs. No. 7 South Carolina; Black Coaches Association Classic	L 72–76 ^{OT}	0–1	Target Center; Minneapolis, Minnesota
Nov 18, 1997*		Fairleigh Dickinson	W 81–70	1–1	Cole Fieldhouse; College Park, Maryland
Nov 22, 1997*		Mount St. Mary's	W 102–74	2–1	Cole Fieldhouse; College Park, Maryland
Nov 25, 1997*	No. 24	Florida International	W 117–70	3–1	Cole Fieldhouse; College Park, Maryland
Dec 4, 1997	No. 23	at No. 17 Clemson	L 65–78 ^{OT}	3–2 (0–1)	Littlejohn Coliseum; Clemson, South Carolina
Dec 7, 1997*	No. 23	vs. No. 2 Kansas; Franklin National Bank Classic	W 86–83	4–2	MCI Center; Washington, D.C.
Dec 8, 1997*	No. 19	vs. George Washington; Franklin National Bank Classic	L 66–70	4–3	MCI Center; Washington, D.C.
Dec 13, 1997*	No. 19	UMBC	W 104–66	5–3	Cole Fieldhouse; College Park, Maryland
Dec 22, 1997*	No. 20	UNC Asheville	W 110–52	6–3	Cole Fieldhouse; College Park, Maryland
Dec 27, 1997*	No. 20	UNC Wilmington	W 74–36	7–3	Cole Fieldhouse; College Park, Maryland
Dec 30, 1997*	No. 20	at Missouri	L 79–83	7–4	Hearnes Center; Columbia, Missouri
Jan 3, 1998	No. 20	No. 3 Duke	L 72–104	7–5 (0–2)	Cole Fieldhouse; College Park, Maryland
Jan 7, 1998		No. 13 Florida State	W 81–74	8–5 (1–2)	Cole Fieldhouse; College Park, Maryland
Jan 10, 1998		at NC State	W 68–65	9–5 (2–2)	Reynolds Coliseum; Raleigh, North Carolina
Jan 14, 1998		No. 1 North Carolina	W 89–83 ^{OT}	10–5 (3–2)	Cole Fieldhouse; College Park, Maryland
Jan 17, 1998		at Wake Forest	L 60–72	10–6 (3–3)	Lawrence Joel Coliseum; Winston-Salem, North Carolina
Jan 21, 1998		at Georgia Tech	W 70–67	11–6 (4–3)	Alexander Memorial Coliseum; Atlanta, Georgia
Jan 24, 1998		No. 25 Clemson	W 74–69	12–6 (5–3)	Cole Fieldhouse; College Park, Maryland
Jan 29, 1998	No. 23	at No. 1 Duke	L 59–86	12–7 (5–4)	Cameron Indoor Stadium; Durham, North Carolina
Feb 1, 1998	No. 23	Virginia	W 77–70	13–7 (6–4)	Cole Fieldhouse; College Park, Maryland
Feb 7, 1998	No. 25	at Florida State	W 68–62	14–7 (7–4)	Donald L. Tucker Center; Tallahassee, Florida
Feb 11, 1998	No. 24	NC State	W 78–63	15–7 (8–4)	Cole Fieldhouse; College Park, Maryland
Feb 14, 1998	No. 24	at No. 1 North Carolina	L 67–85	15–8 (8–5)	Dean Smith Center; Chapel Hill, North Carolina
Feb 19, 1998	No. 25	Wake Forest	L 79–83	15–9 (8–6)	Cole Fieldhouse; College Park, Maryland
Feb 21, 1998	No. 25	Georgia Tech	W 81–69	16–9 (9–6)	Cole Fieldhouse; College Park, Maryland
Feb 24, 1998		at Virginia	W 74–66	17–9 (10–6)	University Hall; Charlottesville, Virginia
Feb 28, 1998*		vs. No. 24 Temple	W 83–66	18–9	Baltimore Arena; Baltimore, Maryland
ACC Tournament
Mar 6, 1998*	No. 21	vs. Georgia Tech; Quarterfinal	W 83–65	19–9	Greensboro Coliseum; Greensboro, North Carolina
Mar 7, 1998*	No. 21	vs. No. 4 North Carolina; Semifinal	L 73–83 ^{OT}	19–10	Greensboro Coliseum; Greensboro, North Carolina
NCAA Tournament
Mar 12, 1998*	(4 W) No. 20	vs. (13 W) Utah State; First round	W 82–68	20–10	ARCO Arena; Sacramento, California
Mar 14, 1998*	(4 W) No. 20	vs. (5 W) No. 22 Illinois; Second Round	W 67–61	21–10	ARCO Arena; Sacramento, California
Mar 19, 1998*	(4 W) No. 20	vs. (1 W) No. 4 Arizona; West Regional semifinal – Sweet Sixteen	L 79–87	21–11	Arrowhead Pond of Anaheim; Anaheim, California
*Non-conference game. ^{#}Rankings from AP Poll. (#) Tournament seedings in parentheses. All times are in Eastern Time.
