= Alvin Jones (basketball) =

Luxembourgish-American basketball player

Personal information
- Born: September 9, 1978 (age 48) Luxembourg City, Luxembourg
- Listed height: 6 ft 11 in (2.11 m)
- Listed weight: 265 lb (120 kg)

Career information
- High school: Kathleen (Lakeland, Florida)
- College: Georgia Tech (1997–2001)
- NBA draft: 2001: 2nd round, 56th overall pick
- Drafted by: Philadelphia 76ers
- Playing career: 2001–2009
- Position: Power forward / center
- Number: 0

Career history
- 2001–2002: Philadelphia 76ers
- 2002–2003: Śląsk Wrocław
- 2003–2004: Caja San Fernando
- 2004: Valencia
- 2005: Plus Pujol Lleida
- 2005–2007: RheinEnergie Köln
- 2007: CSKA Sofia
- 2008: Kombassan Konya
- 2008–2009: Minot SkyRockets

Career highlights
- First-team All-ACC (2001)
- Stats at NBA.com
- Stats at Basketball Reference

Alvin Robert Lamar Jones III (born September 9, 1978) is a Luxembourgish-American former professional basketball player. A 6-foot-11-inch (2.11 m), 265-pound (120 kg) center, he attended Kathleen High School in Lakeland, Florida, and played collegiately at the Georgia Institute of Technology, where he set the program's all-time record for shots blocked with 425.

Jones was drafted by the Philadelphia 76ers with the 56th overall pick of the 2001 NBA draft. He played one National Basketball Association (NBA) season (2001–02), averaging 1.1 points and 1.6 rebounds in 23 games. His final NBA game was Game 5 of the 2002 Eastern Conference First Round against the Boston Celtics where the 76ers lost the game 87–120. Jones recorded 1 rebound and 1 turnover in 4 minutes of playing time and the 76ers were eliminated from the playoffs 4–1.

In 2006, he played with German team RheinEnergie.

== See also ==
- List of NCAA Division I men's basketball career blocks leaders
