= 1997–98 Georgia Tech Yellow Jackets men's basketball team =

American college basketball season

1997–98 Georgia Tech Yellow Jackets men's basketball

Orange Bowl Classic Champion

NIT, 3rd round
- Conference: Atlantic Coast Conference
- Record: 19-14 (6-10 ACC)
- Head coach: Bobby Cremins
- Home arena: Alexander Memorial Coliseum

1997–98 ACC men's basketball standings
	Conf.				Overall
Team	W		L	PCT	W		L	PCT
No. 3 Duke	15	–	1	.938	32	–	4	.889
No. 1 North Carolina†	13	–	3	.813	34	–	4	.895
No. 20 Maryland	10	–	6	.625	21	–	11	.656
Wake Forest	7	–	9	.438	16	–	14	.533
Clemson	7	–	9	.438	18	–	14	.563
Georgia Tech	6	–	10	.375	19	–	14	.576
Florida State	6	–	10	.375	18	–	4	.818
NC State	5	–	11	.313	17	–	15	.531
Virginia	3	–	13	.188	11	–	19	.367
† 1998 ACC tournament winner Rankings from AP poll

The 1997–98 Georgia Tech Yellow Jackets men's basketball team represented the Georgia Institute of Technology as a member of the Atlantic Coast Conference during the 1997–98 NCAA men's basketball season. The team was coached by head coach Bobby Cremins.

On December 27, 1997, Georgia Tech defeated Miami in the Orange Bowl Basketball Classic, 69-61.

The Yellow Jackets finished the season with a 19-14 record. In the 1998 ACC tournament, they lost in the 1st round to Maryland 83-65.

In the 1998 NIT, Georgia Tech earned first round and second round wins over Seton Hall and Georgetown of the Big East. In the second round, Georgia Tech won an 80-79 OT thriller over Georgetown, with Dion Glover scoring 22 points and Matt Harpring adding 20 points. The Yellow Jackets were eliminated in the 3rd round by Penn State 75-70.
