= Rich Yunkus =

American former basketball player (born 1949)

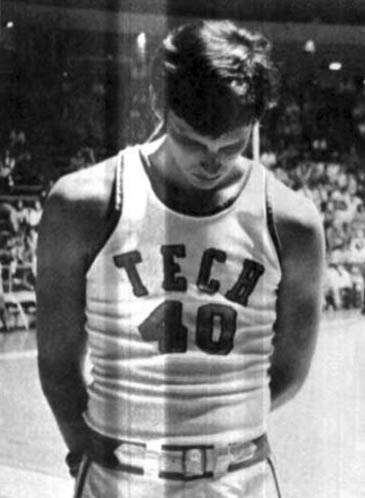
- Yunkus in 1971

Personal information
- Born: November 13, 1949 (age 77) Omaha, Nebraska, U.S.
- Listed height: 6 ft 9 in (2.06 m)
- Listed weight: 215 lb (98 kg)

Career information
- High school: Benton (Benton, Illinois)
- College: Georgia Tech (1968–1971)
- NBA draft: 1971: 3rd round, 38th overall pick
- Drafted by: Cincinnati Royals
- Position: Power forward / center
- Number: 40

Career highlights
- Second-team All-American – NABC (1971); 2× Third-team All-American (1970, 1971); 3× Academic All-American (1969–1971); No. 40 retired by Georgia Tech Yellow Jackets
- Stats at Basketball Reference

Richard A. Yunkus (born November 13, 1949) is an American former basketball player, best known for his All-American college career at Georgia Tech.

Born in Omaha, Nebraska, to a family of Lithuanian descent, Yunkus was a star player at Benton High School in Benton, Illinois, where he led the Rangers to a 61–2 record over his last two seasons. Though Yunkus was recruited by most top schools nationally, he chose to attend Georgia Tech, in part due to his interest in becoming an engineer.

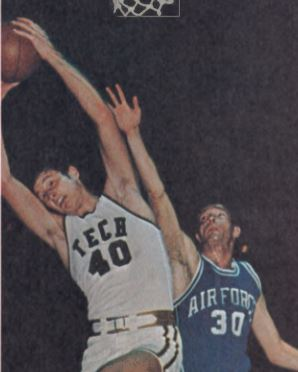
Yunkus as a senior at Georgia Tech

At Georgia Tech, Yunkus proved a capable highly scorer and rebounder, averaging 26.6 points and 11.4 rebounds per game for his three-year varsity career (freshmen were ineligible in his day). He received All-American honors in both his junior and senior seasons and was an Academic All-American all three seasons.

For his career, Yunkus scored 2,232 points and recorded 955 rebounds. He is still the Yellow Jackets' all-time leading scorer, despite playing only three seasons. He also is the program career leader in scoring average.

Following the close of his college career in 1971, Yunkus was drafted by both the ABA's Carolina Cougars and the NBA's Cincinnati Royals (third round, 38th pick overall). The Royals traded his rights to the Atlanta Hawks, but Yunkus ultimately left the team without playing a game for them. He returned home to Benton to enter the business world.
