= Naithan George =

Canadian basketball player

No. 2 – Pittsburgh Panthers
- Position: Point guard
- League: Atlantic Coast Conference

Personal information
- Listed height: 6 ft 3 in (1.91 m)
- Listed weight: 185 lb (84 kg)

Career information
- High school: Bishop Reding Catholic (Milton, Ontario); Canyon International Academy (Glendale, Arizona)
- College: Georgia Tech (2023–2025); Syracuse (2025–2026); Pittsburgh (2026–present)

Naithan George is a Canadian college basketball player for the Pittsburgh Panthers of the Atlantic Coast Conference. He previously played for the Georgia Tech Yellow Jackets and Syracuse Orange.

== Early life and high school ==
George was an unranked recruit in high school and committed to play college basketball for the Georgia Tech Yellow Jackets over other schools such as Seattle and Texas A&M Corpus-Christi.

== College career ==
=== Georgia Tech ===
In his first career game on November 22, 2023, George scored eight points off the bench in a loss to Cincinnati. He made his first career start on November 28 and put up 11 points, four rebounds, an assist, and a block in an upset win over Mississippi State. In his freshman season in 2023-24, George appeared in 29 games with 28 starts, where he averaged 9.8 points, 4.7 assists and 2.4 rebounds per game. On January 28, 2025, he totaled 20 points, six rebounds, five assists, three steals, and two blocks in a loss to Notre Dame. On February 15, George recorded 26 points, eight assists, and three rebounds in a win over California. During the 2024-25 season, he averaged 12.3 points, 4.3 rebounds, and an ACC-leading 6.5 assists per game, earning All-ACC honorable mention. After the season, George entered his name into the NCAA transfer portal.

=== Syracuse ===
He decided to transfer to play for the Syracuse Orange. George averaged 10.9 points, 3 rebounds, 5.4 assists and 1.5 steals per game for the Orange. After the season, he opted to transfer to Pittsburgh.
