= Roshown McLeod =

American basketball player and coach (born 1975)

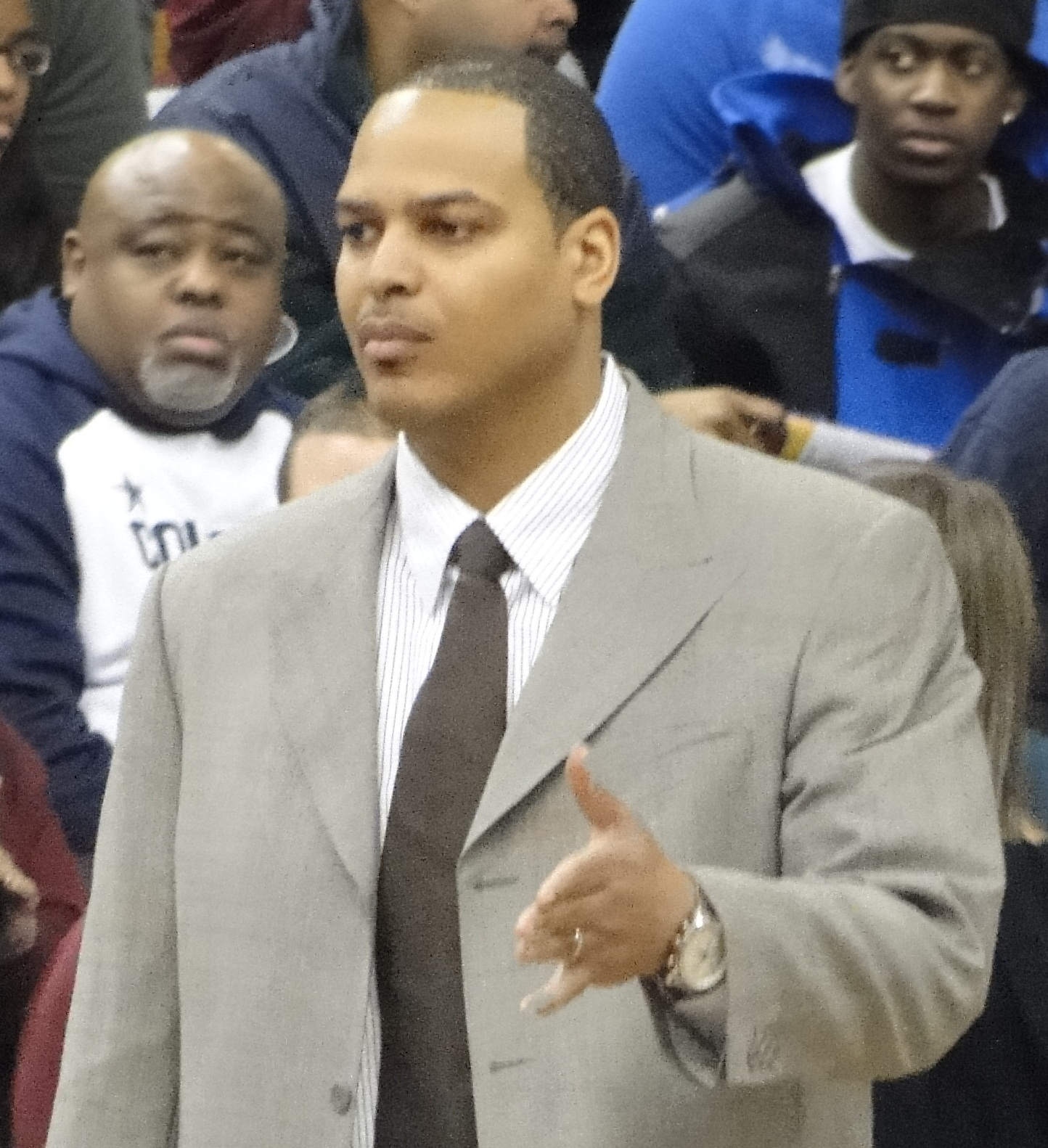
- McLeod in 2010

Personal information
- Born: November 17, 1975 (age 51) Jersey City, New Jersey, U.S.
- Listed height: 6 ft 8 in (2.03 m)
- Listed weight: 221 lb (100 kg)

Career information
- High school: St. Anthony (Jersey City, New Jersey)
- College: St. John's (1993–1995); Duke (1996–1998)
- NBA draft: 1998: 1st round, 20th overall pick
- Drafted by: Atlanta Hawks
- Playing career: 1998–2002
- Position: Small forward
- Number: 7

Career history
- 1998–2001: Atlanta Hawks
- 2001: Philadelphia 76ers

Career highlights
- First-team All-ACC (1998)

Career NBA statistics
- Points: 817 (7.2 ppg)
- Rebounds: 308 (2.7 rpg)
- Assists: 124 (1.1 apg)
- Stats at NBA.com
- Stats at Basketball Reference

Roshown McLeod (born November 17, 1975) is an American former professional basketball player who was selected by the Atlanta Hawks in the first round (20th pick overall) of the 1998 NBA draft. A 6'8" small forward from St. John's University and Duke University, McLeod played in three National Basketball Association (NBA) seasons from 1999 to 2001. He played for the Hawks and briefly for the Philadelphia 76ers. In the 2001–02 season, he was a member of the Boston Celtics but was permanently injured and unable to play. Due to this injury, he had to prematurely end his career.

McLeod played high school basketball at St. Anthony High School in Jersey City.

At the time, McLeod was a rare example of a player who transferred from one school to another. He had trouble breaking into the lineup at St. John's. He was the first transfer accepted by Duke coach Mike Krzyzewski.

In his NBA career, McLeod played in 113 games and scored a total of 817 points. On November 14, 2000, as a member of the Hawks, he scored a career-high 24 points versus the Orlando Magic.

In September 2002, McLeod was named an assistant basketball coach for Fairfield University.

In August 2008, McLeod joined Tom Crean's coaching staff at Indiana University. McLeod was dismissed from IU by Crean on March 7, 2010.

Roshown replaced Dan Hurley at St. Benedict's Preparatory School in Newark, New Jersey, after Hurley took the head coaching job at Wagner College in April 2010. He resigned from St. Benedict's in April 2011.

In 2016, he became the head coach at Fellowship Christian School, a private school in Roswell, Georgia. As of March, McLeod left Fellowship Christian School due to a difference of opinions.

== Personal ==
In an interview with CBS Radio, Roshown McLeod shared that Michael Jordan allegedly serenaded Jerry Stackhouse while scoring 48 points on him during an NBA game by singing the Anita Baker hit "Giving You the Best That I Got".
