= Makhtar N'Diaye (basketball) =

Senegalese basketball player (born 1973)

Personal information
- Born: 12 December 1973 (age 52) Diourbel, Senegal
- Listed height: 2.03 m (6 ft 8 in)
- Listed weight: 111 kg (245 lb)

Career information
- High school: Oak Hill (Mouth of Wilson, Virginia)
- College: Michigan (1993–1995); North Carolina (1996–1998)
- NBA draft: 1998: undrafted
- Playing career: 1998–2008
- Position: Power forward
- Number: 40

Career history
- 1998: Oyak Renault
- 1998–1999: Lietuvos rytas
- 1999: Vancouver Grizzlies
- 1999–2000: Chorale Roanne
- 2000–2001: Besançon BCD
- 2001: Chorale Roanne
- 2001–2002: North Charleston Lowgators
- 2002–2003: JA Vichy
- 2003–2004: JDA Dijon
- 2004: Chorale Roanne
- 2004: Edimes Pavia
- 2005: TBB Trier
- 2005: ASVEL
- 2005–2007: Levallois
- 2007–2008: AEK Larnaca
- Stats at NBA.com
- Stats at Basketball Reference

Makhtar Vincent N'Diaye (born 12 December 1973) is a Senegalese former professional basketball player who played as a power forward and center. He played for the Vancouver Grizzlies in 1999, becoming the first player from Senegal to join and play in the National Basketball Association (NBA).

== Career ==
Born in Diourbel, N'Diaye came to the United States to play high school basketball at Oak Hill Academy in Mouth of Wilson, Virginia. He was recruited to play at Wake Forest by head coach Dave Odom, but was ruled ineligible to play by the National Collegiate Athletic Association (NCAA) because of recruiting violations and transferred to Michigan. After two seasons, he transferred again, to North Carolina. After sitting out the required one season, N'Diaye played under coaches Dean Smith and Bill Guthridge, making the NCAA Tournament Final Four in 1997 and 1998.

During his NCAA playing career, N'Diaye acquired a reputation for rough play and contentious relations with game officials. In one three-game stretch in February 1998, he was assessed four technical fouls. He attracted national attention for his troublesome attitude during the 1998 Final Four, where he fouled out after only fourteen minutes of play in North Carolina's national semifinal loss to the University of Utah. During the game, he purportedly spat in the face of opposing player Britton Johnsen, and claimed that Johnsen had directed a racial slur at him and denied the spitting incident afterwards. Following a national uproar and vociferous denials of hate speech from both Johnsen and Utah coach Rick Majerus, N'Diaye retracted the accusation and issued a public apology.

After going unselected in the 1998 NBA draft, N'Diaye signed as a free agent with the Vancouver Grizzlies. He played 4 games for Vancouver in the lockout-shortened 1999 season before he was traded to the Orlando Magic, who released him before the 1999–2000 season. He continued his career in Europe, mostly in the French league, save for a season-long stint with the North Charleston Lowgators of the NBA Development League in 2001–02.

He represented Senegal at the FIBA World Championship in 1998 and 2006, and played on the team that won the FIBA Africa Championship in 1997.

== Career statistics ==
Legend
| GP | Games played | GS | Games started | MPG | Minutes per game |
| FG% | Field goal percentage | 3P% | 3-point field goal percentage | FT% | Free throw percentage |
| RPG | Rebounds per game | APG | Assists per game | SPG | Steals per game |
| BPG | Blocks per game | PPG | Points per game | **Bold** | Career high |

=== NBA ===
==== Regular season ====
| Year | Team | GP | GS | MPG | FG% | 3P% | FT% | RPG | APG | SPG | BPG | PPG |
|---|---|---|---|---|---|---|---|---|---|---|---|---|
| 1998–99 | Vancouver | 4 | 0 | 6.8 | .250 | – | .750 | 1.3 | .3 | .0 | .3 | 1.3 |
