= Antawn Jamison =

American basketball player (born 1976)

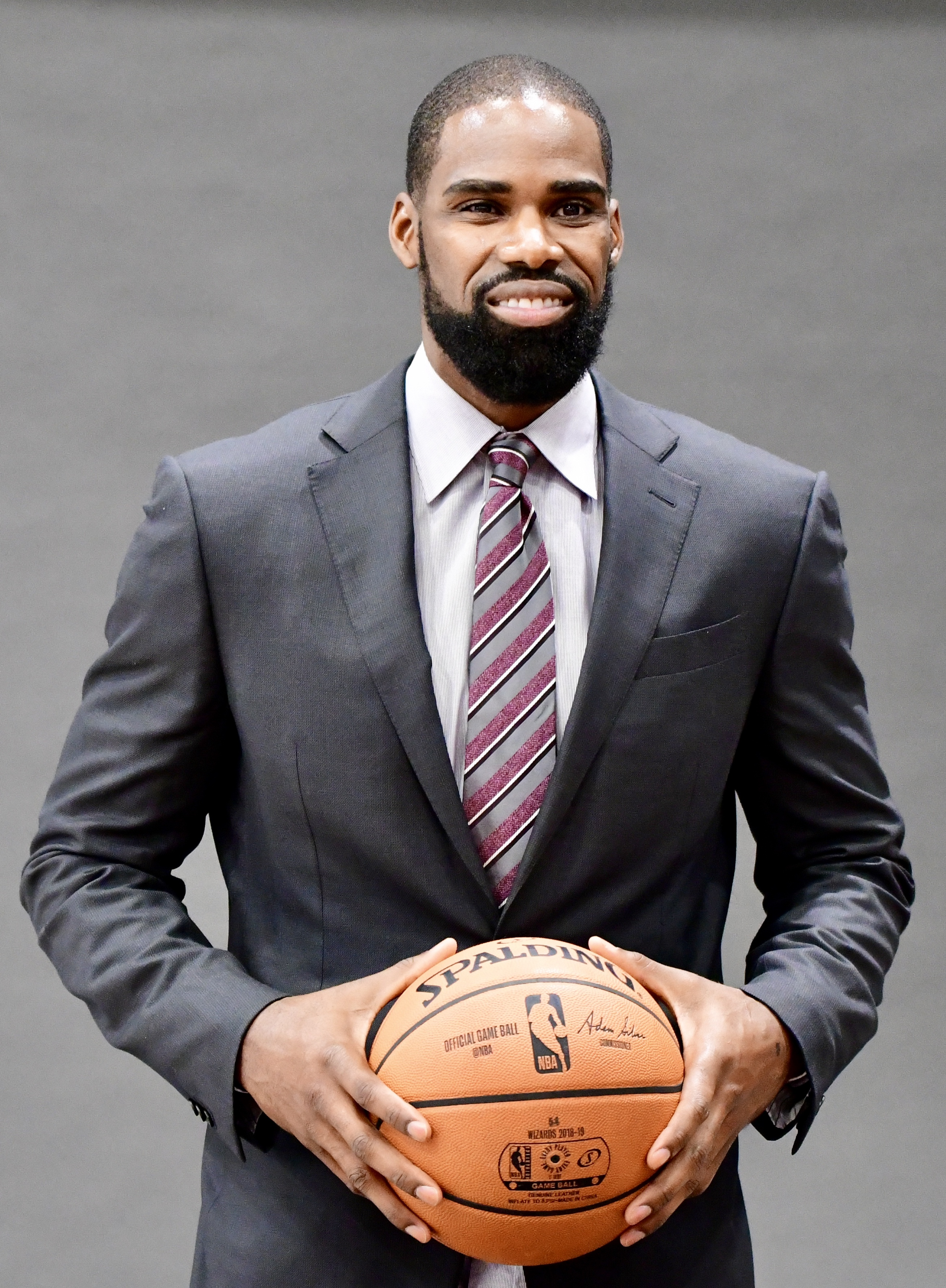
- Jamison in 2019

Washington Wizards
- Title: Director of pro personnel
- League: NBA

Personal information
- Born: June 12, 1976 (age 50) Shreveport, Louisiana, U.S.
- Listed height: 6 ft 9 in (2.06 m)
- Listed weight: 235 lb (107 kg)

Career information
- High school: Providence (Charlotte, North Carolina)
- College: North Carolina (1995–1998)
- NBA draft: 1998: 1st round, 4th overall pick
- Drafted by: Toronto Raptors
- Playing career: 1998–2014
- Position: Power forward / small forward
- Number: 7, 33, 4

Career history
- 1998–2003: Golden State Warriors
- 2003–2004: Dallas Mavericks
- 2004–2010: Washington Wizards
- 2010–2012: Cleveland Cavaliers
- 2012–2013: Los Angeles Lakers
- 2013–2014: Los Angeles Clippers

Career highlights
- 2× NBA All-Star (2005, 2008); NBA Sixth Man of the Year (2004); NBA All-Rookie Second Team (1999); National college player of the year (1998); Consensus first-team All-American (1998); Consensus second-team All-American (1997); ACC Player of the Year (1998); 3× First-team All-ACC (1996–1998); ACC All-Freshman Team (1996); ACC tournament MVP (1998); No. 33 retired by North Carolina Tar Heels; McDonald's All-American (1995); North Carolina Mr. Basketball (1995)

Career NBA statistics
- Points: 20,042 (18.5 ppg)
- Rebounds: 8,157 (7.5 rpg)
- Assists: 1,761 (1.6 apg)
- Stats at NBA.com
- Stats at Basketball Reference
- Collegiate Basketball Hall of Fame
Medals
Men's basketball
Representing United States
World Championships
Bronze medal – third place	2006 Japan	Team

Antawn Cortez Jamison (/ˈæntwɑːn ˈdʒeɪmɪsən/ ANT-wahn JAY-mih-sən; born June 12, 1976) is an American former professional basketball player who played 16 seasons in the National Basketball Association (NBA). He serves as director of pro personnel for the Washington Wizards. Jamison played college basketball for the North Carolina Tar Heels, being named national player of the year in 1998.

He was selected by the Toronto Raptors as the fourth overall pick of the 1998 NBA draft before being traded to the Golden State Warriors for former Tar Heel teammate Vince Carter. Named to the NBA All-Rookie Team with the Warriors, Jamison was a two-time All-Star and won the NBA Sixth Man of the Year Award in 2004. He was a member of the United States national team in 2006. Upon his retirement from the NBA, he worked as an analyst for Time Warner Cable SportsNet and as a scout for the Los Angeles Lakers before being hired by the Washington Wizards as their director of pro personnel in 2019.

== Early life ==
Jamison was born in Shreveport, Louisiana. His parents named him "Antwan", but the hospital misspelled it "Antawn" on his birth certificate. The error was never corrected, but the pronunciation (as "Antoine") did not change. Jamison played basketball and football (as a quarterback) at Quail Hollow Middle School in Charlotte, North Carolina. He went on to play high school basketball at Charlotte's Providence High School, where he was named a McDonald's All-American after his senior season, during which he averaged 27 points, 13 rebounds and 4.5 blocks per game.

== College career ==
Jamison played three seasons of college basketball for the University of North Carolina at Chapel Hill, averaging 19.0 points and 9.9 rebounds per game. In his junior year, he was awarded both the Naismith and Wooden Awards as the most outstanding men's college basketball player for the 1997–98 season. Jamison decided to forgo his senior year of eligibility and enter the NBA draft in 1998. He subsequently returned and earned a B.A. in Afro-American and African studies, graduating in August 1999.

On March 1, 2000, Jamison's #33 was retired at the Dean E. Smith Center, the seventh Tar Heel so honored.

== Professional career ==
=== Golden State Warriors (1998–2003) ===
Jamison was selected with the fourth pick of the 1998 NBA draft by the Toronto Raptors, who then dealt his rights to the Golden State Warriors in exchange for former North Carolina teammate and best friend Vince Carter. Jamison spent the first five years of his NBA career with the Warriors. He scored a career-high 51 points on two occasions, back-to-back against Seattle and the Lakers (the Warriors won that game). He averaged a career-high 24.9 points per game in 2000–01, his third season in the league. Following his breakout season, Jamison signed a 6-year, $86 million contract extension through the 2007–08 season.

=== Dallas Mavericks (2003–2004) ===
In 2003, Jamison was traded to the Dallas Mavericks in a nine-player deal that sent him, forwards Danny Fortson and Chris Mills, and guard Jiří Welsch to the Mavs and guard Nick Van Exel, center Evan Eschmeyer, guard Avery Johnson, and forwards Popeye Jones and Antoine Rigaudeau to the Warriors. With Dallas, Jamison experienced his first winning season in 2003–04 as the Mavericks finished 52–30 and made the playoffs, which also marked the first time in his career that Jamison had experienced post-season play. Jamison was named as the NBA's Sixth Man of the Year for his efforts. The Mavericks suffered a setback in the first round, falling in five games to the Sacramento Kings.

=== Washington Wizards (2004–2010) ===
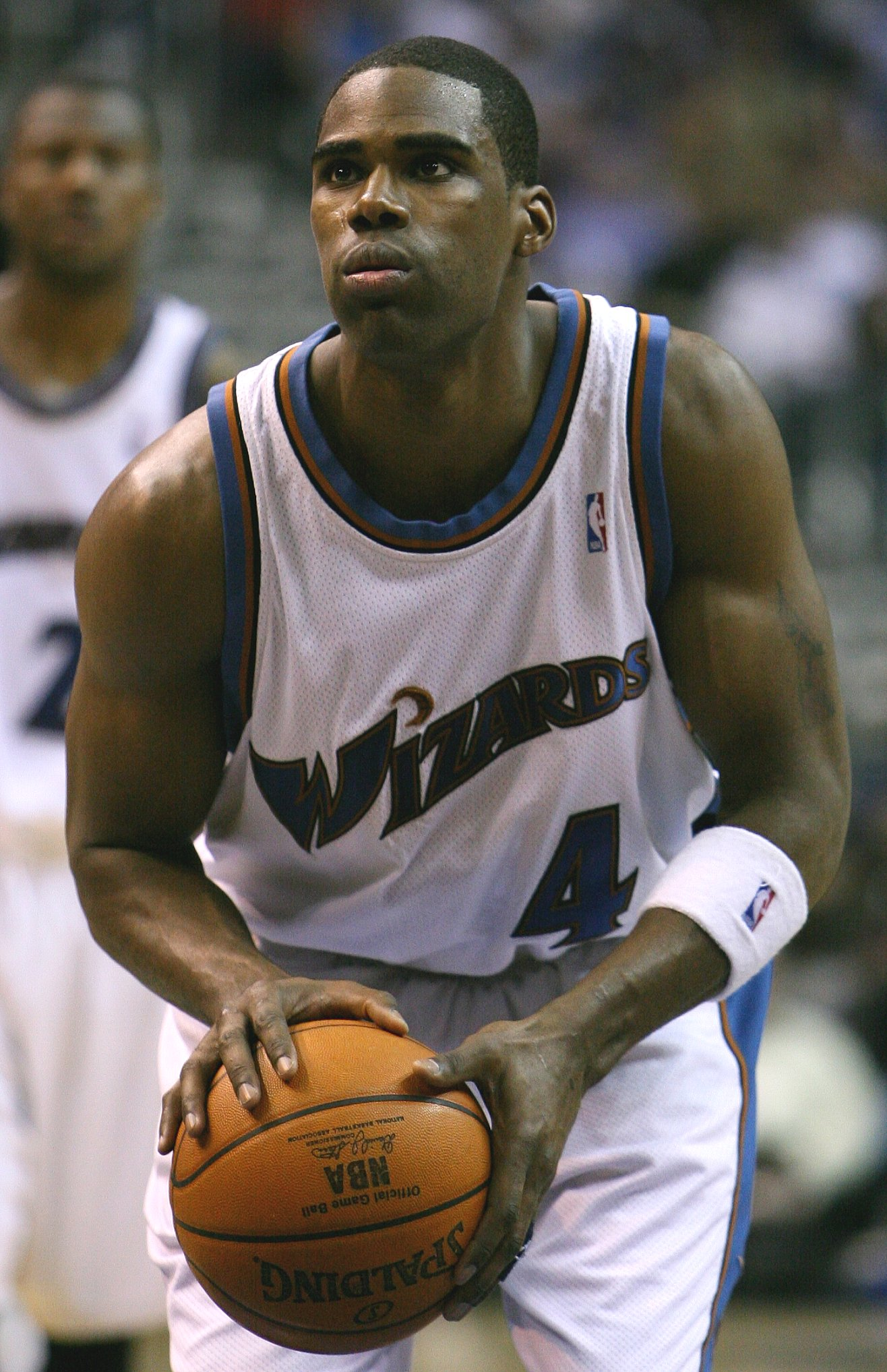
Jamison with the Wizards in 2007

At season's end Jamison was traded again, this time to the Wizards, in exchange for former Tar Heel Jerry Stackhouse, and former Blue Devil Christian Laettner and a first-round draft pick (which turned out to be University of Wisconsin–Madison point guard, Devin Harris). The trade reunited Jamison with former Golden State teammates Gilbert Arenas and Larry Hughes.

In the 2004–05 season with the Wizards, he was named to the NBA All-Star team for the first time in his career and the Wizards enjoyed a solid 45–37 win–loss season, their finest effort in 26 years. They also made the playoffs for the first time since 1997 and advanced to the second round for the first time since 1982.

In 2006, Jamison played for the US national team in the 2006 FIBA World Championship, winning a bronze medal.

Jamison led the Wizards against the Cleveland Cavaliers in the first round of the 2007 playoffs. Jamison averaged 32 points and 10 rebounds per game during the series.

During the 2007–08 season, Jamison was named to his second NBA Eastern All-Star team. On June 30, 2008, he signed a four-year, $50 million contract with the Wizards.

=== Cleveland Cavaliers (2010–2012) ===
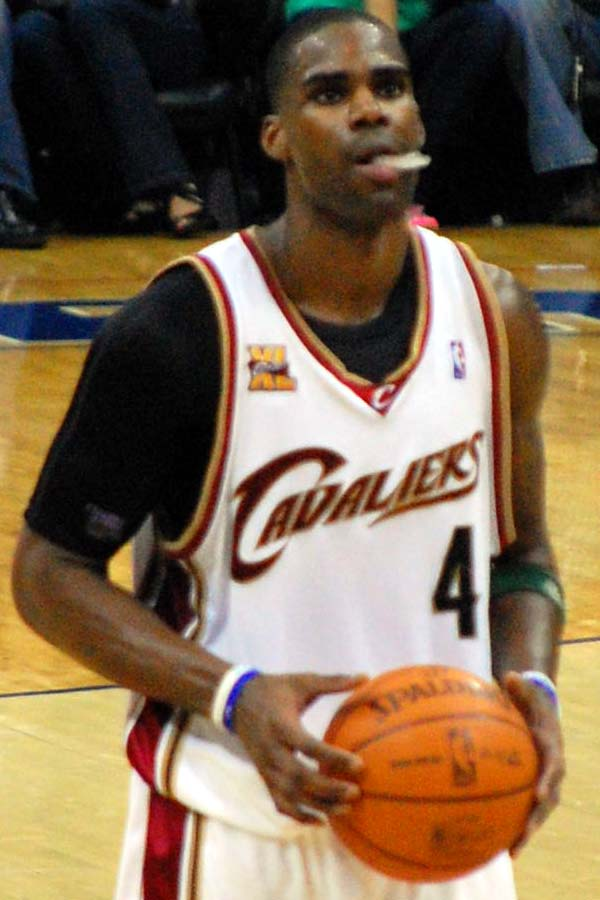
Jamison with the Cavaliers in 2010

On February 17, 2010, Jamison was traded to the Cleveland Cavaliers as part of a three-team, six-player trade that sent Al Thornton from the Los Angeles Clippers to the Washington Wizards, Žydrūnas Ilgauskas, a 2010 first-round pick and the rights to Emir Preldžič from Cleveland to Washington, Drew Gooden from Washington to Los Angeles and Sebastian Telfair from Los Angeles to Cleveland. In his first game with the Cleveland Cavaliers against the Charlotte Bobcats, Jamison scored only two points from two free throws as he went 0 for 12 from the field. In his second game with the Cavaliers, Jamison scored 19 points against the Orlando Magic. The Cleveland Cavaliers, along with Jamison, made the NBA playoffs as the team with the best record. The Cavaliers defeated the Chicago Bulls in five games, but fell to the Boston Celtics in 6 games.

In January 2011, Jamison said that he was considering retirement, and that his 2011–12 season could be his last. On February 27, in a loss to the 76ers, Jamison was fouled and broke his left pinky. He underwent a surgery, and would be out the rest of the season.

=== Los Angeles Lakers (2012–2013) ===
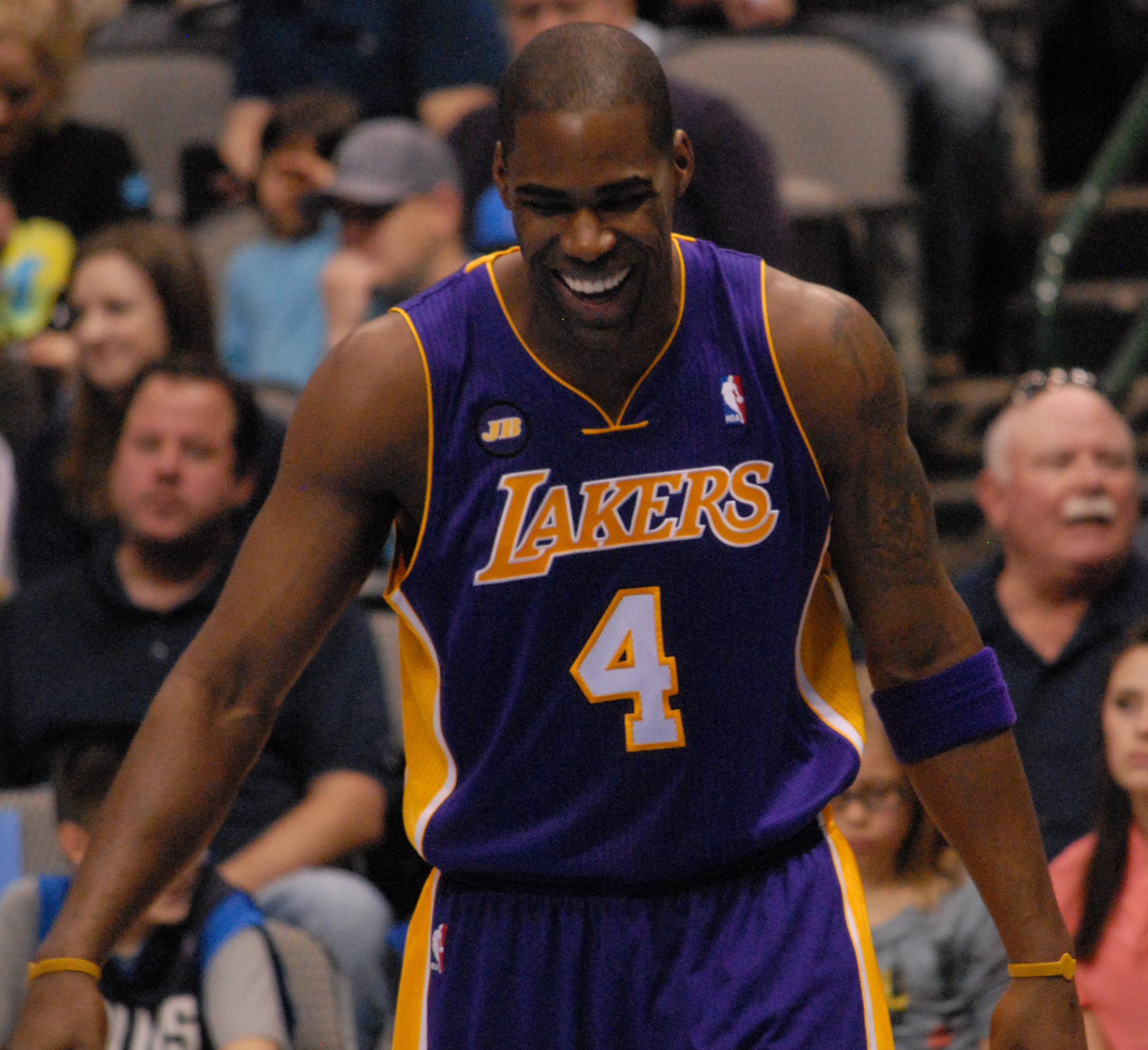
Jamison playing for the Lakers, 2013

On July 25, 2012, Jamison signed with the Los Angeles Lakers for the NBA veteran's minimum. On November 30 against the Denver Nuggets, he scored a season-high 33 points and grabbed 12 rebounds, becoming the first Laker since Shaquille O'Neal in 1998 to record a 30/10 game as a reserve. However, coach Mike D'Antoni did not play him for multiple games, partially due to Jamison's inconsistent shooting and subpar defense. On January 4, 2013, he played against the Los Angeles Clippers for the first time after six games on the bench. On January 6, he entered in the first quarter against the Denver Nuggets and hit a jumper for his first points since December 13. He played four minutes before being benched the rest of the game. Jamison again became a part of the Lakers' regular rotation after forward Pau Gasol was out with a foot injury. After the early communication issues with D'Antoni, their relationship improved significantly.

=== Los Angeles Clippers (2013–2014) ===
On August 28, 2013, Jamison signed with the Los Angeles Clippers. On December 11, 2013, in the second quarter against the Boston Celtics, he scored a 3-pointer which took his career points tally past the 20,000 mark, becoming just the 39th player in NBA history to achieve this.

On February 20, 2014, Jamison was traded to the Atlanta Hawks in exchange for the draft rights to Cenk Akyol. He was waived by the Hawks the next day.

=== Retirement and legacy ===
Jamison retired from the NBA in 2014.

Of all former NBA players that are (or have been) eligible for election to the Naismith Memorial Basketball Hall of Fame, Jamison is one of only three players (along with Tom Chambers and Joe Johnson) to have scored 20,000 or more career points without being elected to the Hall.

== Post-playing career ==
In October 2014, Jamison retired from professional basketball and became a broadcaster for Time Warner Cable SportsNet as a TV analyst for the Los Angeles Lakers.

On October 3, 2017, Jamison was hired in a scouting role by the Los Angeles Lakers. In August 2019, he was hired by the Wizards to become their director of pro personnel.

== Philanthropy ==
Jamison awarded his first Antawn C. Jamison Scholarship at his high school alma mater in 2003. He has also launched a campaign which he calls "A Better Tomorrow" which he hopes to use to provide the underprivileged with a chance at a better future. He says of the project: "As a professional athlete, I have an obligation to help those less fortunate. I really enjoy being in a position to aid my community – both in the Bay Area and back home in Charlotte – and put a smile on somebody's face. That is what it is all about. I think it is especially important to give back during the holidays, when people tend to feel a little down if things are not going too well."

== Career statistics ==
Legend
GP	Games played	GS	Games started	MPG	Minutes per game
FG%	Field goal percentage	3P%	3-point field goal percentage	FT%	Free throw percentage
RPG	Rebounds per game	APG	Assists per game	SPG	Steals per game
BPG	Blocks per game	PPG	Points per game	**Bold**	Career high
*	Led the league

=== College ===
Year	Team	GP	GS	MPG	FG%	3P%	FT%	RPG	APG	SPG	BPG	PPG
1995–96	North Carolina	32	**29**	32.9	**.624**	.000	.596	9.7	**1.0**	.8	**1.0**	15.1
1996–97	North Carolina	35	*	**34.3**	.544	.182	.621	9.4	0.9	**1.1**	.6	19.1
1997–98	North Carolina	**37**	*	33.2	.579	**.400**	**.667**	**10.5**	0.8	0.8	0.8	**22.2**
Career		104	*	33.5	.577	.296	.617	9.9	0.9	0.9	.8	19.0

=== Regular season ===
Year	Team	GP	GS	MPG	FG%	3P%	FT%	RPG	APG	SPG	BPG	PPG
1998–99	Golden State	47	24	22.5	.452	.300	.588	6.4	.7	.8	.3	9.6
1999–00	Golden State	43	41	36.2	.471	.286	.611	8.3	2.1	.7	.3	19.6
2000–01	Golden State	**82**	**82***	**41.4**	.442	.302	.715	8.7	2.0	**1.4**	.3	**24.9**
2001–02	Golden State	**82**	**82**	37.0	.447	.324	.734	6.8	2.0	.9	.5	19.7
2002–03	Golden State	**82**	**82***	39.3	.470	.311	**.789**	7.0	1.9	.9	.5	22.2
2003–04	Dallas	**82**	2	29.0	**.535**	**.400**	.748	6.3	.9	1.0	.4	14.8
2004–05	Washington	68	68	38.3	.437	.341	.760	7.6	**2.3**	.8	.2	19.6
2005–06	Washington	**82***	80	40.1	.442	.394	.731	9.3	1.9	1.1	.1	20.5
2006–07	Washington	70	70	38.0	.450	.364	.736	8.0	1.9	1.1	.5	19.8
2007–08	Washington	79	79	38.7	.436	.339	.760	**10.2**	1.5	1.3	.4	21.4
2008–09	Washington	81	81	38.2	.468	.351	.754	8.9	1.9	1.2	.3	22.2
2009–10	Washington	41	41	38.9	.420	.345	.700	8.8	1.3	1.0	.2	20.5
2009–10	Cleveland	25	23	32.4	.485	.342	.506	7.7	1.3	1.1	.5	15.8
2010–11	Cleveland	56	38	32.9	.427	.346	.731	6.7	1.7	.9	.5	18.0
2011–12	Cleveland	65	65	33.1	.403	.341	.683	6.3	2.0	.8	**.7**	17.2
2012–13	L.A. Lakers	76	6	21.5	.464	.361	.691	4.8	.7	.4	.3	9.4
2013–14	L.A. Clippers	22	0	11.3	.315	.195	.720	2.5	.4	.3	.1	3.8
Career		1083	864	34.8	.451	.346	.724	7.5	1.6	1.0	.4	18.5
All-Star		2	0	12.5	.375	.333	.000	2.5	.5	.0	.5	3.5

=== Playoffs ===
Year	Team	GP	GS	MPG	FG%	3P%	FT%	RPG	APG	SPG	BPG	PPG
2004	Dallas	5	0	21.8	.456	.250	.733	5.0	.4	1.0	.4	13.0
2005	Washington	10	10	38.0	.451	**.500**	.688	6.3	1.2	.7	.4	18.5
2006	Washington	6	6	42.2	.424	.313	**.778**	7.2	**3.0**	1.0	.3	19.2
2007	Washington	4	4	**43.3**	**.476**	.346	.750	9.8	1.3	.5	1.0	**32.0**
2008	Washington	6	6	39.5	.406	.280	.571	**12.0**	1.0	**1.3**	**1.3**	16.8
2010	Cleveland	**11**	**11**	34.1	.467	.256	.732	7.4	1.3	.6	1.0	15.3
2013	L.A. Lakers	4	0	19.8	.435	.417	.667	1.8	.3	.3	.5	7.3
Career		46	37	34.9	.448	.341	.706	7.2	1.3	.8	.7	17.2

== Career highs ==
- Points: 51 (2 times)
- Rebounds: 23 vs. New York 01/30/10
- Assists: 7 (7 times)
- Steals: 6 (5 times)
- Blocks: 5 vs. Miami 12/15/06
