= 1997–98 NCAA Division I men's basketball season =

Basketball season

- Preseason AP No. 1: Arizona Wildcats
- Regular season: November 1997 – March 1998
- NCAA Tournament: 1998
- Tournament dates: March 12 – 30, 1998
- National Championship: Alamodome; San Antonio, Texas
- NCAA Champions: Kentucky Wildcats
- Other champions: Minnesota Golden Gophers (NIT)
- Player of the Year (Naismith, Wooden): Antawn Jamison, North Carolina Tar Heels

The 1997–98 NCAA Division I men's basketball season began in November 1997 and concluded with the 64-team 1998 NCAA Division I men's basketball tournament, whose finals were held at the Alamodome in San Antonio, Texas. The Kentucky Wildcats earned their seventh national championship by defeating the Utah Utes 78–69 on March 30, 1998. They were coached by Tubby Smith and the NCAA basketball tournament Most Outstanding Player was Kentucky's Jeff Shepherd.

In the 32-team 1998 National Invitation Tournament, the Minnesota Golden Gophers defeated the Penn State Nittany Lions at Madison Square Garden in New York City.

Following the season, the 1998 NCAA Men's Basketball All-American Consensus First Team included Mike Bibby, Antawn Jamison, Raef LaFrentz, Paul Pierce, and Miles Simon. The consensus second team was composed of Vince Carter, Mateen Cleaves, Pat Garrity, Richard Hamilton, and Ansu Sesay.

== Season headlines ==
- All NCAA Division I teams played as members of conferences for the first time in American college basketball history.
- Tubby Smith led the Kentucky Wildcats to their seventh national championship.

== Pre-season polls ==
The top 25 from the pre-season AP Poll.

Associated Press
Ranking	Team
1	Arizona
2	Kansas
3	Duke
4	North Carolina
5	Clemson
6	UCLA
7	South Carolina
8	Kentucky
9	Purdue
10	Xavier
11	New Mexico
12	Connecticut
13	Fresno State
14	Stanford
15	Iowa
16	Utah
17	Indiana
18	Charlotte
19	Georgia
20	Oklahoma
21	Rhode Island
22	Texas
23	Ole Miss
24	Temple
25	Louisville

== Conference membership changes ==
These schools joined new conferences for the 1997–98 season.

School	Former conference	New conference
Arkansas–Pine Bluff Golden Lions	NAIA independent	Southwestern Athletic Conference
Central Connecticut State Blue Devils	Mid-Continent Conference	Northeast Conference
Marist Red Foxes	Northeast Conference	Metro Atlantic Athletic Conference
Marshall Thundering Herd	Southern Conference	Mid-American Conference
Norfolk State Spartans	CIAA (D-II)	Mid-Eastern Athletic Conference
Northern Illinois Huskies	Midwestern Collegiate Conference	Mid-American Conference
Oral Roberts Golden Eagles	NCAA Division I independent	Mid-Continent Conference
Rider Broncs	Northeast Conference	Metro Atlantic Athletic Conference
Southeastern Louisiana Lions	Trans America Athletic Conference	Southland Conference
Southern Utah Thunderbirds	NCAA Division I independent	Mid-Continent Conference
Troy State Trojans	Mid-Continent Conference	Trans America Athletic Conference
UNC Greensboro Spartans	Big South Conference	Southern Conference
Wofford Terriers	NCAA Division I independent	Southern Conference

== New arenas ==
Georgetown, which had used off-campus USAirways Arena (previously known as Capital Centre and USAir Arena) in Landover, Maryland, as its home court since the 1981–82 season, played three last home games there in November 1997 before moving in December 1997 to the new MCI Center (later known as the Verizon Center and as Capital One Arena), an off-campus site in Washington, D.C. The Hoyas played their first home game at the MCI Center on December 3, 1997, losing their Big East Conference opener to Villanova 73–69 before a crowd of 13,181.

== Regular season ==
=== Early-season tournaments ===
Name	Dates	Site	Teams	Champions
Coaches vs. Cancer IKON Classic	Nov. 11–12	Continental Airlines Arena, East Rutherford, NJ	4	North Carolina State
Red Auerbach Classic	Nov. 14–15	Charles E. Smith Center, Washington, DC	4	George Washington
Preseason NIT	Nov. 17–28	Campus sites and Madison Square Garden, New York, NY	16	Kansas
AT&T Shootout	Nov. 21–22	Alumni Hall, Fairfield, CT	4	Fairfield
Lobo Classic	Nov. 21–22	University Arena, Albuquerque, NM	4	New Mexico
Top of the World Classic	Nov. 21–23	Carlson Center, Fairbanks, AK	8	Gonzaga
Maui Invitational	Nov. 24–26	Lahaina Civic Center, Maui, HI	8	Duke
Great Alaska Shootout	Nov. 27–29	Sullivan Arena, Anchorage, AK	8	North Carolina
Puerto Rico Shootout	Nov. 27–29	Eugene Guerra Sports Complex, San Juan, PR	8	Georgia Tech
Coca-Cola Classic	Nov. 28–29	Cumberland County Crown Coliseum, Fayetteville, NC	4	UNC Wilmington
Coca-Cola Spartan Classic	Nov. 28–29	Breslin Center, East Lansing, MI	4	Michigan State
Pepsi Marist Classic	Nov. 28–29	McCann Arena, Poughkeepsie, NY	4	Wagner
Racer Thanksgiving Tournament	Nov. 28–29	Racer Arena, Murray, KY	4	Murray State
Big Island Invitational	Nov. 28–30	Afook-Chinen Civic Auditorium, Hilo, HI	8	Stanford
San Juan Shootout	Nov. 28–30	Caguas Municipal Complex, San Juan, PR	8	West Virginia
Golden Panther Thanksgiving Tournament	Nov. 29–30	Golden Panther Arena, Miami, FL	4	Florida International
United Airlines Tip-Off Tournament	Nov. 29–30	Stan Sheriff Center, Honolulu, HI	4	Hawaii
Phoenix Classic	Dec. 4–5	Hartford Civic Center, Hartford, CT	4	Fairfield
Ameritas Classic	Dec. 5–6	Devaney Center, Lincoln, NE	4	Nebraska
Cyclone Challenge	Dec. 5–6	Hilton Coliseum, Ames, IA	4	Iowa State
First Merchants Bank/CVC Classic	Dec. 5–6	Worthen Arena, Muncie, IN	4	Ball State
Jam Fest Tournament	Dec. 5–6	Moby Arena, Fort Collins, CO	4	Colorado State
Marquette Tournament	Dec. 5–6	Bradley Center, Milwaukee, WI	4	Marquette
Montana Holiday Tournament	Dec. 5–6	Harry Adams Field House, Missoula, MT	4	UIC
Northwestern Mutual Classic	Dec. 5–6	War Memorial Gymnasium, San Francisco, CA	4	San Francisco
Pizza Hut Classic	Dec. 5–6	Hammons Student Center, Springfield, MO	4	Southwest Missouri State
Super Chevy Shootout	Dec. 5–6	Carver-Hawkeye Arena, Iowa City, IA	4	Iowa
TCBY Holiday Classic	Dec. 5–6	Barton Coliseum, Little Rock, AR	4	Southern Miss
PowerBar Classic	Dec. 6–7	Stan Sheriff Center, Honolulu, HI	4	Hawaii
Franklin National Bank Classic	Dec. 7–8	MCI Center, Washington, DC	4	George Washington

=== Conferences ===
==== Conference winners and tournaments ====
Twenty-eight conferences concluded their regular seasons with a single-elimination tournament, with only the Ivy League and the Pacific-10 Conference choosing not to conduct conference tournaments. Most conference tournament winners received an automatic bid to the 1998 NCAA Division I men's basketball tournament.

Conference	Regular season winner	Conference player of the year	Conference tournament	Tournament venue (City)	Tournament winner
America East Conference	Delaware	Speedy Claxton, Hofstra	1998 America East men's basketball tournament	Bob Carpenter Center (Newark, Delaware)	Delaware
Atlantic 10 Conference	Temple (East); Xavier (West)	Cuttino Mobley, Rhode Island	1998 Atlantic 10 men's basketball tournament	The Spectrum (Philadelphia, Pennsylvania)	Xavier
Atlantic Coast Conference	Duke	Antawn Jamison, North Carolina	1998 ACC men's basketball tournament	Greensboro Coliseum (Greensboro, North Carolina)	North Carolina
Big 12 Conference	Kansas	Raef LaFrentz, Kansas	1998 Big 12 men's basketball tournament	Kemper Arena (Kansas City, Missouri)	Kansas
Big East Conference	Connecticut (Big East 6); Syracuse (Big East 7)	Richard Hamilton, Connecticut	1998 Big East men's basketball tournament	Madison Square Garden (New York City, New York)	Connecticut
Big Sky Conference	Northern Arizona	Andrew Mavis, Northern Arizona	1998 Big Sky Conference men's basketball tournament	Dee Events Center (Ogden, Utah)	Northern Arizona
Big South Conference	UNC Asheville	Josh Pittman, UNC Asheville	1998 Big South Conference men's basketball tournament	Vines Center (Lynchburg, Virginia)	Radford
Big Ten Conference	Michigan State	Mateen Cleaves, Michigan State	1998 Big Ten Conference men's basketball tournament	United Center (Chicago, Illinois)	Michigan
Big West Conference	Pacific (Eastern); Utah State (Western)	Michael Olowokandi, Pacific	1998 Big West Conference men's basketball tournament	Lawlor Events Center (Reno, Nevada)	Utah State
Colonial Athletic Association	William & Mary	Jarod Stevenson, Richmond	1998 CAA men's basketball tournament	Richmond Coliseum (Richmond, Virginia)	Richmond
Conference USA	Cincinnati (American); Memphis (National)	DeMarco Johnson, Charlotte	1998 Conference USA men's basketball tournament	Shoemaker Center (Cincinnati, Ohio)	Cincinnati
Ivy League	Princeton	Steve Goodrich, Princeton	No Tournament		
Metro Atlantic Athletic Conference	Iona	Kashif Hameed, Iona	1998 MAAC men's basketball tournament	Pepsi Arena (Buffalo, New York)	Iona
Mid-American Conference	Akron (East); Ball State (West)	Bonzi Wells, Ball State	1998 MAC men's basketball tournament	SeaGate Convention Centre (Toledo, Ohio)	Eastern Michigan
Mid-Continent Conference	Valparaiso	Bryce Drew, Valparaiso	1998 Mid-Continent Conference men's basketball tournament	The MARK of the Quad Cities (Moline, Illinois)	Valparaiso
Mid-Eastern Athletic Conference	Coppin State	Antoine Brockington, Coppin State	1998 MEAC men's basketball tournament	Richmond Coliseum (Richmond, Virginia)	South Carolina State
Midwestern Collegiate Conference	Detroit	Mark Miller, Illinois-Chicago	1998 Midwestern Collegiate Conference men's basketball tournament	Brown County Veterans Memorial Arena (Green Bay, Wisconsin)	Butler
Missouri Valley Conference	Illinois State	Rico Hill, Illinois State	1998 Missouri Valley Conference men's basketball tournament	Savvis Center (St. Louis, Missouri)	Illinois State
Northeast Conference	Long Island	Charles Jones, Long Island	1998 Northeast Conference men's basketball tournament	Spiro Sports Center (Staten Island, New York)	Fairleigh Dickinson
Ohio Valley Conference	Murray State	De'Teri Mayes, Murray State	1998 Ohio Valley Conference men's basketball tournament	Gaylord Entertainment Center (Nashville, Tennessee) (Semifinals and Finals)	Murray State
Pacific-10 Conference	Arizona	Mike Bibby, Arizona	No Tournament		
Patriot League	Lafayette	Stefan Ciosici, Lafayette	1998 Patriot League men's basketball tournament	Kirby Sports Center (Easton, Pennsylvania)	Navy
Southeastern Conference	Kentucky (East); Ole Miss (West)	Ansu Sesay, Ole Miss	1998 SEC men's basketball tournament	Georgia Dome (Atlanta, Georgia)	Kentucky
Southern Conference	Appalachian State (North); Chattanooga (South)	Bobby Phillips, Western Carolina (Coaches) & Chuck Vincent, Furman (Media)	1998 Southern Conference men's basketball tournament	Greensboro Coliseum (Greensboro, North Carolina)	Davidson
Southland Conference	UTSA	Roderic Hall, UTSA	1998 Southland Conference men's basketball tournament	Hirsch Memorial Coliseum (Shreveport, Louisiana) (Semifinals & Finals)	Nicholls State
Southwestern Athletic Conference	Texas Southern	Randy Bolden, Texas Southern	1998 SWAC men's basketball tournament	F. G. Clark Center (Baton Rouge, Louisiana)	Prairie View A&M
Sun Belt Conference	South Alabama	Chico Fletcher, Arkansas State	1998 Sun Belt Conference men's basketball tournament	Cajundome (Lafayette, Louisiana)	South Alabama
Trans America Athletic Conference	Charleston (East); Georgia State (West)	Mark Jones, UCF	1998 TAAC men's basketball tournament	Memorial Coliseum (Jacksonville, Florida)	Charleston
West Coast Conference	Gonzaga	Bakari Hendrix, Gonzaga	1998 West Coast Conference men's basketball tournament	Toso Pavilion (Santa Clara, California)	San Francisco
Western Athletic Conference	TCU (Mountain); Utah (Pacific)	Lee Nailon, TCU	1998 WAC men's basketball tournament	Thomas & Mack Center (Las Vegas, Nevada)	UNLV

==== Conference standings ====
1997–98 America East Conference men's basketball standings
	Conf.				Overall
Team	W		L	PCT	W		L	PCT
Delaware †	12	–	6	.667	20	–	10	.667
Boston University	12	–	6	.667	19	–	11	.633
Vermont	11	–	7	.611	16	–	11	.593
Hartford	11	–	7	.611	15	–	12	.556
Hofstra	11	–	7	.611	19	–	12	.613
Drexel	10	–	8	.556	13	–	15	.464
Northeastern	9	–	9	.500	14	–	14	.500
New Hampshire	6	–	12	.333	10	–	17	.370
Towson	4	–	14	.222	8	–	20	.286
Maine	4	–	14	.222	7	–	20	.259
† 1998 America East tournament winner Rankings from AP poll

1997–98 ACC men's basketball standings
	Conf.				Overall
Team	W		L	PCT	W		L	PCT
No. 3 Duke	15	–	1	.938	32	–	4	.889
No. 1 North Carolina†	13	–	3	.813	34	–	4	.895
No. 20 Maryland	10	–	6	.625	21	–	11	.656
Wake Forest	7	–	9	.438	16	–	14	.533
Clemson	7	–	9	.438	18	–	14	.563
Georgia Tech	6	–	10	.375	19	–	14	.576
Florida State	6	–	10	.375	18	–	4	.818
NC State	5	–	11	.313	17	–	15	.531
Virginia	3	–	13	.188	11	–	19	.367
† 1998 ACC tournament winner Rankings from AP poll

1997–98 Atlantic 10 men's basketball standings
	Conf.				Overall
Team	W		L	PCT	W		L	PCT
East
No. 24 Temple	13	–	3	.813	21	–	9	.700
Rhode Island	12	–	4	.750	25	–	9	.735
UMass	12	–	4	.750	21	–	11	.656
St. Bonaventure	6	–	10	.375	17	–	15	.531
Saint Joseph's	3	–	13	.188	11	–	17	.393
Fordham	2	–	14	.125	6	–	21	.222
West
No. 23 Xavier †	11	–	5	.688	22	–	8	.733
George Washington	11	–	5	.688	24	–	9	.727
Dayton	11	–	5	.688	21	–	12	.636
Virginia Tech	5	–	11	.313	10	–	17	.370
Duquesne	5	–	11	.313	11	–	19	.367
La Salle	5	–	11	.313	9	–	18	.333
† 1998 Atlantic 10 Tournament winner Rankings from AP Poll

1997–98 Big 12 men's basketball standings
	Conf.				Overall
Team	W		L	PCT	W		L	PCT
No. 2 Kansas †	15	–	1	.938	35	–	4	.897
Oklahoma State	11	–	5	.688	22	–	7	.759
Oklahoma	11	–	5	.688	22	–	11	.667
Nebraska	10	–	6	.625	20	–	12	.625
Baylor	8	–	8	.500	14	–	14	.500
Missouri	8	–	8	.500	17	–	15	.531
Texas Tech	7	–	9	.438	13	–	14	.481
Kansas State	7	–	9	.438	17	–	12	.586
Colorado	7	–	9	.438	13	–	14	.481
Texas	6	–	10	.375	14	–	17	.452
Iowa State	5	–	11	.313	12	–	18	.400
Texas A&M	1	–	15	.063	7	–	20	.259
† 1998 Big 12 Tournament winner Rankings from AP poll

1997–98 Big East men's basketball standings
	Conf.				Overall
Team	W		L	PCT	W		L	PCT
Big East 6
No. 6 Connecticut†	15	–	3	.833	32	–	5	.865
St. John's	13	–	5	.722	22	–	10	.688
West Virginia	11	–	7	.611	24	–	9	.727
Villanova	8	–	10	.444	12	–	17	.414
Notre Dame	7	–	11	.389	13	–	14	.481
Boston College	6	–	12	.333	15	–	16	.484
Big East 7
No. 21 Syracuse	12	–	6	.667	26	–	9	.743
Miami	11	–	7	.611	18	–	10	.643
Seton Hall	9	–	9	.500	15	–	15	.500
Providence	7	–	11	.389	13	–	16	.448
Pittsburgh	6	–	12	.333	11	–	16	.407
Rutgers	6	–	12	.333	14	–	15	.483
Georgetown	6	–	12	.333	16	–	15	.516
† 1998 Big East tournament winner As of March 30, 1998; Rankings from AP poll

1997–98 Big Sky men's basketball standings
	Conf.				Overall
Team	W		L	PCT	W		L	PCT
Northern Arizona †	13	–	3	.813	21	–	8	.724
Weber State	12	–	4	.750	14	–	13	.519
Portland State	10	–	6	.625	15	–	12	.556
Eastern Washington	10	–	6	.625	16	–	11	.593
Montana	9	–	7	.563	16	–	14	.533
Montana State	9	–	7	.563	19	–	11	.633
Cal State Northridge	7	–	9	.438	12	–	16	.429
Idaho State	2	–	14	.125	6	–	20	.231
Sacramento State	0	–	16	.000	1	–	25	.038
† Conference tournament winner

1997–98 Big South Conference men's basketball standings
	Conf.				Overall
Team	W		L	PCT	W		L	PCT
UNC Asheville	11	–	1	.917	19	–	9	.679
Radford †	10	–	2	.833	20	–	10	.667
UMBC	6	–	6	.500	14	–	14	.500
Liberty	5	–	7	.417	11	–	17	.393
Coastal Carolina	4	–	8	.333	8	–	19	.296
Winthrop	4	–	8	.333	7	–	20	.259
Charleston Southern	2	–	10	.167	5	–	22	.185
† 1998 Big South tournament winner Rankings from AP Poll

1997–98 Big Ten Conference men's basketball standings
	Conf.				Overall
Team	W		L	PCT	W		L	PCT
No. 16 Michigan State	13	–	3	.813	22	–	8	.733
No. 22 Illinois	13	–	3	.813	23	–	10	.697
No. 11 Purdue	12	–	4	.750	28	–	8	.778
Iowa	9	–	7	.563	20	–	11	.645
Indiana	9	–	7	.563	20	–	12	.625
Penn State	8	–	8	.500	19	–	13	.594
Northwestern	3	–	13	.188	10	–	17	.370
Wisconsin	3	–	13	.188	12	–	19	.387
Ohio State	1	–	15	.063	8	–	22	.267
No. 12 Michigan* †	0	–	5	.000	0	–	8	.000
Minnesota**	0	–	10	.000	0	–	15	.000
† 1998 Big Ten tournament winner Rankings from AP poll *Michigan: 24 reg. season games including Big Ten Tourn. Champ.; 2 NCAA Tourn. games vacated due to sanctions against the program **Minnesota: 15 games including 5 NIT games and championship vacated due to sanctions against the program Disputed records: Michigan 25–9, 11–5; Minnesota 20–15, 6–10

1997–98 Big West men's basketball standings
	Conf.				Overall
Team	W		L	PCT	W		L	PCT
East Division
Utah State†	13	–	3	.813	25	–	8	.758
Nevada	11	–	5	.688	16	–	12	.571
Boise State	9	–	7	.563	17	–	13	.567
Idaho	9	–	7	.563	15	–	12	.556
New Mexico State	8	–	8	.500	18	–	12	.600
North Texas	4	–	12	.250	5	–	21	.192
West Division
Pacific	14	–	2	.875	23	–	10	.697
Cal Poly	7	–	9	.438	14	–	14	.500
Cal State Fullerton	6	–	10	.375	12	–	16	.429
UC Irvine	6	–	10	.375	9	–	18	.333
Long Beach State	5	–	11	.313	10	–	19	.345
UC Santa Barbara	4	–	12	.250	7	–	19	.269
† 1998 Big West tournament winner As of April 10, 1998; Rankings from AP poll

1997–98 CAA men's basketball standings
	Conf.				Overall
Team	W		L	PCT	W		L	PCT
UNC Wilmington	13	–	3	.813	20	–	11	.645
William & Mary	13	–	3	.813	20	–	7	.741
Richmond †	12	–	4	.750	23	–	8	.742
Old Dominion	8	–	8	.500	12	–	16	.429
James Madison	6	–	10	.375	11	–	16	.407
George Mason	6	–	10	.375	9	–	18	.333
American	5	–	11	.313	9	–	19	.321
East Carolina	5	–	11	.313	10	–	17	.370
VCU	4	–	12	.250	9	–	19	.321
† 1998 CAA tournament winner Rankings from AP Poll

1997–98 Conference USA men's basketball standings
	Conf.				Overall
Team	W		L	PCT	W		L	PCT
American
No. 9 Cincinnati †	14	–	2	.875	27	–	6	.818
UNC Charlotte	13	–	3	.813	20	–	11	.645
Saint Louis	11	–	5	.688	22	–	11	.667
Marquette	8	–	8	.500	20	–	11	.645
Louisville	5	–	11	.313	12	–	20	.375
DePaul	3	–	13	.188	7	–	23	.233
National
Memphis	12	–	4	.750	17	–	12	.586
UAB	10	–	6	.625	21	–	12	.636
Southern Miss	9	–	7	.563	22	–	11	.667
South Florida	7	–	9	.438	17	–	13	.567
Houston	2	–	14	.125	9	–	20	.310
Tulane	2	–	14	.125	7	–	22	.241
† 1998 Conference USA Tournament winner Rankings from AP Poll

1997–98 Ivy League men's basketball standings
	Conf.				Overall
Team	W		L	PCT	W		L	PCT
No. 8 Princeton	14	–	0	1.000	27	–	2	.931
Penn	10	–	4	.714	17	–	12	.586
Yale	7	–	7	.500	12	–	14	.462
Harvard	6	–	8	.429	13	–	13	.500
Columbia	6	–	8	.429	11	–	15	.423
Cornell	6	–	8	.429	9	–	17	.346
Dartmouth	4	–	10	.286	7	–	19	.269
Brown	3	–	11	.214	6	–	20	.231
Rankings from AP Poll

1997–98 MAAC men's basketball standings
	Conf.				Overall
Team	W		L	PCT	W		L	PCT
Iona †	15	–	3	.833	27	–	6	.818
Rider	12	–	6	.667	18	–	10	.643
Siena	10	–	8	.556	17	–	12	.586
Niagara	10	–	8	.556	14	–	13	.519
Loyola (MD)	9	–	9	.500	12	–	16	.429
Canisius	9	–	9	.500	13	–	14	.481
Manhattan	7	–	11	.389	12	–	17	.414
Marist	7	–	11	.389	11	–	17	.393
Fairfield	7	–	11	.389	12	–	15	.444
Saint Peter's	4	–	14	.222	8	–	19	.296
† 1998 MAAC tournament winner Rankings from AP Poll

1997–98 Mid-American Conference men's basketball standings
	Conf.				Overall
Team	W		L	PCT	W		L	PCT
East
Akron	13	–	5	.722	17	–	10	.630
Kent State	9	–	9	.500	13	–	17	.433
Miami	9	–	9	.500	17	–	12	.586
Marshall	7	–	11	.389	11	–	16	.407
Bowling Green	7	–	11	.389	10	–	16	.385
Ohio	3	–	15	.167	5	–	21	.192
West
Ball State	14	–	4	.778	21	–	8	.724
Western Michigan	14	–	4	.778	21	–	8	.724
Eastern Michigan †	13	–	5	.722	20	–	10	.667
Toledo	10	–	8	.556	15	–	12	.556
Northern Illinois	6	–	12	.333	10	–	16	.385
Central Michigan	3	–	15	.167	5	–	21	.192
† 1998 MAC tournament winner Rankings from AP Poll

1997–98 Mid-Continent Conference men's basketball standings
	Conf.				Overall
Team	W		L	PCT	W		L	PCT
Valparaiso †	13	–	3	.813	23	–	10	.697
Oral Roberts	12	–	4	.750	19	–	12	.613
Youngstown State	11	–	5	.688	20	–	9	.690
Western Illinois	11	–	5	.688	16	–	11	.593
Buffalo	9	–	7	.563	15	–	13	.536
Missouri–Kansas City	7	–	9	.438	9	–	18	.333
Southern Utah	4	–	12	.250	7	–	20	.259
Northeastern Illinois	3	–	13	.188	6	–	19	.240
Chicago State	2	–	14	.125	2	–	25	.074
† 1998 Mid-Con Tournament winner Rankings from

1997–98 MEAC men's basketball standings
	Conf.				Overall
Team	W		L	PCT	W		L	PCT
Coppin State	17	–	1	.944	21	–	8	.724
South Carolina State †	16	–	2	.889	22	–	8	.733
Hampton	11	–	7	.611	14	–	12	.538
Morgan State	11	–	7	.611	12	–	16	.429
Florida A&M	8	–	10	.444	11	–	17	.393
Delaware State	7	–	11	.389	9	–	18	.333
Maryland Eastern Shore	7	–	11	.389	9	–	18	.333
North Carolina A&T	7	–	11	.389	8	–	19	.296
Howard	5	–	13	.278	8	–	20	.286
Bethune–Cookman	1	–	17	.056	1	–	26	.037
Norfolk State	0	–	0	–	6	–	21	.222
† 1998 MEAC tournament winner Rankings from AP Poll

1997–98 Midwestern Collegiate Conference men's basketball standings
	Conf.				Overall
Team	W		L	PCT	W		L	PCT
Detroit	12	–	2	.857	25	–	6	.806
UIC	12	–	2	.857	22	–	6	.786
Butler †	8	–	6	.571	22	–	11	.667
Green Bay	7	–	7	.500	17	–	12	.586
Cleveland State	6	–	8	.429	12	–	15	.444
Loyola Chicago	6	–	8	.429	15	–	15	.500
Wright State	3	–	11	.214	10	–	18	.357
Milwaukee	2	–	12	.143	3	–	24	.111
† 1998 MCC tournament winner

1997–98 Missouri Valley Conference men's basketball standings
	Conf.				Overall
Team	W		L	PCT	W		L	PCT
Illinois State †	16	–	2	.889	25	–	6	.806
Creighton	12	–	6	.667	18	–	10	.643
Southwest Missouri State	11	–	7	.611	16	–	16	.500
Wichita State	11	–	7	.611	16	–	15	.516
Indiana State	10	–	8	.556	16	–	11	.593
Evansville	9	–	9	.500	15	–	15	.500
Bradley	9	–	9	.500	15	–	14	.517
Southern Illinois	8	–	10	.444	14	–	18	.438
Northern Iowa	4	–	14	.222	10	–	17	.370
Drake	0	–	18	.000	3	–	24	.111
† 1998 MVC tournament winner Rankings from AP Poll

1997–98 Northeast Conference men's basketball standings
	Conf.				Overall
Team	W		L	PCT	W		L	PCT
Long Island	14	–	2	.875	21	–	11	.656
Fairleigh Dickinson †	13	–	3	.813	23	–	7	.767
St. Francis (NY)	10	–	6	.625	15	–	12	.556
Saint Francis (PA)	10	–	6	.625	17	–	10	.630
Mount St. Mary's	8	–	8	.500	13	–	15	.464
Wagner	7	–	9	.438	13	–	16	.448
Robert Morris	4	–	12	.250	8	–	19	.296
Monmouth	3	–	13	.188	4	–	23	.148
Central Connecticut	3	–	13	.188	4	–	22	.154
† 1998 NEC tournament winner Rankings from AP Poll

1997–98 Ohio Valley Conference men's basketball standings
	Conf.				Overall
Team	W		L	PCT	W		L	PCT
No. 25 Murray State †	16	–	2	.889	29	–	4	.879
Eastern Illinois	13	–	5	.722	16	–	11	.593
Middle Tennessee	12	–	6	.667	19	–	9	.679
Austin Peay	11	–	7	.611	17	–	11	.607
Southeast Missouri State	10	–	8	.556	14	–	13	.519
Tennessee State	8	–	10	.444	13	–	16	.448
Eastern Kentucky	8	–	10	.444	10	–	17	.370
Tennessee Tech	5	–	13	.278	9	–	21	.300
UT Martin	5	–	13	.278	7	–	20	.259
Morehead State	2	–	16	.111	3	–	23	.115
† 1998 OVC tournament winner Rankings from AP Poll

1997–98 Pacific-10 Conference men's basketball standings
	Conf.				Overall
Team	W		L	PCT	W		L	PCT
No. 4 Arizona	17	–	1	.944	30	–	5	.857
No. 10 Stanford	15	–	3	.833	30	–	5	.857
No. 19 UCLA	12	–	6	.667	24	–	9	.727
Washington	11	–	7	.611	20	–	10	.667
Arizona State	8	–	10	.444	18	–	14	.563
Oregon	8	–	10	.444	13	–	14	.481
California	8	–	10	.444	12	–	15	.444
USC	5	–	13	.278	9	–	19	.321
Oregon State	3	–	15	.167	13	–	17	.433
Washington State	3	–	15	.167	10	–	19	.345
As of November 23, 2011; Rankings from AP Poll

1997–98 Patriot League men's basketball standings
	Conf.				Overall
Team	W		L	PCT	W		L	PCT
Lafayette	10	–	2	.833	19	–	9	.679
Navy †	10	–	2	.833	19	–	11	.633
Bucknell	8	–	4	.667	13	–	15	.464
Colgate	5	–	7	.417	10	–	18	.357
Lehigh	4	–	8	.333	10	–	17	.370
Holy Cross	3	–	9	.250	7	–	20	.259
Army	2	–	10	.167	8	–	19	.296
† 1998 Patriot League tournament winner

1997–98 Southeastern Conference men's basketball standings
	Conf.				Overall
Team	W		L	PCT	W		L	PCT
East
No. 5 Kentucky †	14	–	2	.875	35	–	4	.897
No. 14 South Carolina	11	–	5	.688	23	–	8	.742
Tennessee	9	–	7	.563	20	–	9	.690
Georgia	7	–	9	.438	20	–	15	.571
Vanderbilt	7	–	9	.438	20	–	13	.606
Florida	6	–	10	.375	14	–	15	.483
West
No. 13 Ole Miss	12	–	4	.750	22	–	7	.759
No. 17 Arkansas	11	–	5	.688	24	–	9	.727
Auburn	7	–	9	.438	16	–	14	.533
Alabama	6	–	10	.375	15	–	16	.484
Mississippi State	4	–	12	.250	15	–	15	.500
LSU	2	–	14	.125	9	–	18	.333
† 1998 SEC tournament winner Rankings from AP Poll

1997–98 Southern Conference men's basketball standings
	Conf.				Overall
Team	W		L	PCT	W		L	PCT
North
Davidson †	13	–	2	.867	20	–	10	.667
Appalachian State	13	–	2	.867	21	–	8	.724
VMI	8	–	7	.533	14	–	13	.519
Western Carolina	6	–	9	.400	12	–	15	.444
East Tennessee State	6	–	9	.400	11	–	16	.407
UNC Greensboro	6	–	9	.400	9	–	19	.321
South
Chattanooga	7	–	7	.500	13	–	15	.464
Wofford	6	–	8	.429	9	–	18	.333
The Citadel	6	–	8	.429	15	–	13	.536
Georgia Southern	5	–	9	.357	9	–	20	.310
Furman	4	–	10	.286	10	–	18	.357
† 1998 SoCon Tournament winner As of April 30, 1998; Rankings from AP poll

1997–98 Southland Conference men's basketball standings
	Conf.				Overall
Team	W		L	PCT	W		L	PCT
Nicholls State †	15	–	1	.938	19	–	10	.655
Southwest Texas State	10	–	6	.625	17	–	11	.607
UTSA	10	–	6	.625	16	–	11	.593
Northwestern State	10	–	6	.625	13	–	14	.481
Northeast Louisiana	8	–	8	.500	13	–	16	.448
Texas-Arlington	8	–	8	.500	13	–	16	.448
Sam Houston State	7	–	9	.438	9	–	17	.346
Stephen F. Austin	6	–	10	.375	10	–	16	.385
McNeese State	4	–	12	.250	7	–	19	.269
Southeastern Louisiana	2	–	14	.125	6	–	20	.231
† 1998 Southland tournament winner Rankings from AP Poll

1997–98 SWAC men's basketball standings
	Conf.				Overall
Team	W		L	PCT	W		L	PCT
Texas Southern	12	–	4	.750	15	–	16	.484
Jackson State	11	–	5	.688	14	–	13	.519
Grambling	10	–	6	.625	16	–	12	.571
Southern	10	–	6	.625	14	–	13	.519
Alcorn State	8	–	8	.500	12	–	15	.444
Prairie View A&M †	6	–	10	.375	13	–	17	.433
Alabama State	6	–	10	.375	11	–	17	.393
Mississippi Valley State	6	–	10	.375	6	–	21	.222
Arkansas–Pine Bluff	3	–	13	.188	4	–	23	.148
† 1998 SWAC tournament winner Rankings from AP Poll

1997–98 Sun Belt Conference men's basketball standings
	Conf.				Overall
Team	W		L	PCT	W		L	PCT
South Alabama †	14	–	4	.778	21	–	7	.750
Arkansas State	14	–	4	.778	20	–	9	.690
Southwestern Louisiana	12	–	6	.667	18	–	13	.581
Arkansas–Little Rock	10	–	8	.556	15	–	13	.536
Louisiana Tech	9	–	9	.500	12	–	15	.444
New Orleans	9	–	9	.500	15	–	12	.556
Lamar	7	–	11	.389	15	–	14	.517
Jacksonville	6	–	12	.333	8	–	19	.296
Western Kentucky	6	–	12	.333	10	–	19	.345
Texas–Pan American	3	–	15	.167	3	–	24	.111
† 1998 Sun Belt Conference tournament winner Rankings from AP Poll

1997–98 Trans America Athletic Conference men's basketball standings
	Conf.				Overall
Team	W		L	PCT	W		L	PCT
East
College of Charleston †	14	–	2	.875	24	–	6	.800
Florida International	13	–	3	.813	21	–	8	.724
Central Florida	11	–	5	.688	17	–	11	.607
Stetson	8	–	8	.500	11	–	15	.423
Florida Atlantic	5	–	11	.313	5	–	22	.185
Campbell	4	–	12	.250	10	–	17	.370
West
Georgia State	11	–	5	.688	16	–	12	.571
Samford	9	–	7	.563	14	–	13	.519
Centenary	8	–	8	.500	10	–	20	.333
Jacksonville State	6	–	10	.375	12	–	14	.462
Troy	5	–	11	.313	7	–	20	.259
Mercer	2	–	14	.125	5	–	21	.192
† 1998 TAAC tournament winner Rankings from AP poll

1997–98 West Coast Conference men's basketball standings
	Conf.				Overall
Team	W		L	PCT	W		L	PCT
Gonzaga	10	–	4	.714	24	–	10	.706
Pepperdine	9	–	5	.643	17	–	10	.630
Santa Clara	8	–	6	.571	18	–	10	.643
Saint Mary's	7	–	7	.500	11	–	15	.423
San Francisco †	7	–	7	.500	19	–	11	.633
Portland	7	–	7	.500	14	–	13	.519
San Diego	5	–	9	.357	14	–	14	.500
Loyola Marymount	3	–	11	.214	7	–	20	.259
† Conference tournament winner Rankings from AP poll

1997–98 WAC men's basketball standings
	Conf.				Overall
Team	W		L	PCT	W		L	PCT
Mountain
No. 7 Utah	12	–	2	.857	30	–	4	.882
No. 18 New Mexico	11	–	3	.786	24	–	8	.750
Wyoming	9	–	5	.643	19	–	9	.679
Colorado State	8	–	6	.571	20	–	9	.690
UNLV †	7	–	7	.500	20	–	13	.606
BYU	4	–	10	.286	9	–	21	.300
UTEP	3	–	11	.214	12	–	14	.462
Air Force	2	–	12	.143	10	–	16	.385
Pacific
No. 15 TCU	14	–	0	1.000	27	–	6	.818
Fresno State	10	–	4	.714	21	–	13	.618
Tulsa	9	–	5	.643	19	–	12	.613
Hawaii	8	–	6	.571	21	–	9	.700
SMU	6	–	8	.429	18	–	10	.643
San Diego State	5	–	9	.357	13	–	15	.464
Rice	3	–	11	.214	6	–	22	.214
San Jose State	1	–	13	.071	3	–	23	.115
† 1998 WAC tournament winner Rankings from AP Poll

=== Informal championships ===
Conference	Regular season winner	Most Valuable Player
Philadelphia Big 5	La Salle, Penn, Saint Joseph's, Temple, & Villanova	Rashid Bey, Saint Joseph's

For the seventh consecutive season, the Philadelphia Big 5 did not play a full round-robin schedule in which each team met each other team once, a format it had used from its first season of competition in 1955–56 through the 1990–91 season. Instead, each team played only two games against other Big 5 members, and all five teams finished with 1–1 records in head-to-head competition among the Big 5. The Big 5 did not revive its full round-robin schedule until the 1999–2000 season.

=== Statistical leaders ===
Source for additional stats categories

Points per game			Rebounds per game			Assists per game			Steals per game		
Player	School	PPG	Player	School	RPG	Player	School	APG	Player	School	SPG
Charles Jones	Long Island	29.0	Ryan Perryman	Dayton	12.5	Ahlon Lewis	Arizona St.	9.2	Bonzi Wells	Ball St.	3.6
Earl Boykins	E. Michigan	25.7	Eric Taylor	St. Francis (PA)	11.9	Chico Fletcher	Arkansas State	8.3	Pepe Sánchez	Temple	3.4
Lee Nailon	TCU	24.9	Raef LaFrentz	Kansas	11.4	Sean Colson	UNC Charlotte	8.0	Willie Coleman	DePaul	3.3
Brett Eppehimer	Lehigh	24.7	Tremaine Fowlkes	Fresno St.	11.2	Ed Cota	North Carolina	7.4	J. R. Camel	Montana	3.1
Cory Carr	Texas Tech	23.3	Michael Olowokandi	Pacific	11.2	Charles Jones	Long Island	7.4	Jason Rowe	Loyola (MD)	3.1

Blocked shots per game			Field-goal percentage			Three-Point FG percentage			Free-throw percentage		
Player	School	BPG	Player	School	FG%	Player	School	3FG%	Player	School	FT%
Jerome James	Florida A&M	4.6	Todd MacCulloch	Washington	65.0	Jim Cantamessa	Siena	56.4	Matt Sundblad	Lamar	92.3
Calvin Booth	Penn St.	4.4	Ryan Moss	UALR	65.0	Coby Turner	Dayton	51.7	Louis Bullock	Michigan	91.1
Alvin Jones	Georgia Tech	4.3	Jarrett Stephens	Penn St.	64.0	Royce Olney	New Mexico	51.3	Shammond Williams	N. Carolina	91.1
Etan Thomas	Syracuse	3.9	Isaac Spencer	Murray St.	63.3	Mike Beam	Harvard	51.3	Kevin Ault	Missouri St.	90.0
Brian Skinner	Baylor	3.5	Brad Miller	Purdue	63.2	Kenyan Weaks	Florida	50.8	Clifton Ellis	Texas St.	90.0

== Postseason tournaments ==
=== NCAA tournament ===
==== Final Four – Alamodome, San Antonio, Texas ====
National semifinals
E1	North Carolina	59
W3	Utah	65
S2	Kentucky	86
M3	Stanford	85

National championship game
W3	Utah	69
S2	Kentucky	78

=== National Invitation tournament ===
==== Semifinals & finals ====
Semifinals
Georgia	60
Penn State	66
Fresno State	89
Minnesota	91

Finals
Penn State	72
Minnesota	79
Third place
Georgia	95
Fresno State	79

== Award winners ==
=== Consensus All-American teams ===
Consensus First Team
Player	Position	Class	Team
Mike Bibby	G	Sophomore	Arizona
Antawn Jamison	F	Junior	North Carolina
Raef LaFrentz	C	Senior	Kansas
Paul Pierce	F	Junior	Kansas
Miles Simon	G	Senior	Arizona

Consensus Second Team
Player	Position	Class	Team
Vince Carter	F	Junior	North Carolina
Mateen Cleaves	G	Sophomore	Michigan State
Pat Garrity	F	Senior	Notre Dame
Richard Hamilton	F-G	Sophomore	Connecticut
Ansu Sesay	F	Senior	Mississippi

=== Major player of the year awards ===
- Wooden Award: Antawn Jamison, North Carolina
- Naismith Award: Antawn Jamison, North Carolina
- Associated Press Player of the Year: Antawn Jamison, North Carolina
- NABC Player of the Year: Antawn Jamison, North Carolina
- Oscar Robertson Trophy (USBWA): Antawn Jamison, North Carolina
- Adolph Rupp Trophy: Antawn Jamison, North Carolina
- Sporting News Player of the Year: Antawn Jamison, North Carolina

=== Major freshman of the year awards ===
- USBWA Freshman of the Year: Larry Hughes, St. Louis
- Sporting News Freshman of the Year: Larry Hughes, St. Louis

=== Major coach of the year awards ===
- Associated Press Coach of the Year: Tom Izzo, Michigan State
- Henry Iba Award (USBWA): Tom Izzo, Michigan State
- NABC Coach of the Year: Bill Guthridge, North Carolina
- Naismith College Coach of the Year: Bill Guthridge, North Carolina
- Sporting News Coach of the Year: Bill Guthridge, North Carolina

=== Other major awards ===
- NABC Defensive Player of the Year: Steve Wojciechowski, Duke
- Frances Pomeroy Naismith Award (Best player under 6'0): Earl Boykins, Eastern Michigan
- Robert V. Geasey Trophy (Top player in Philadelphia Big 5): Rashid Bey, St. Joseph's
- NIT/Haggerty Award (Top player in New York City metro area): Felipe López, St. John's
- Chip Hilton Player of the Year Award (Strong personal character): Hassan Booker, Navy

== Coaching changes ==
A number of teams changed coaches during the season and after it ended.

Team	Former Coach	Interim Coach	New Coach	Reason
Alabama	David Hobbs		Mark Gottfried	
Arizona State	Bill Frieder	Don Newman	Rob Evans	Frieder resigned before the start of the 1997–98 season. Evans was interim for the entire season.
Chicago State	Phillip Gary		Bo Ellis	Ellis was hired from the Marquette coaching staff.
Clemson	Rick Barnes		Larry Shyatt	Barnes left to coach Texas.
Coastal Carolina	Michael Hopkins		Pete Strickland	Strickland was hired from the Dayton coaching staff.
Colgate	Paul Aiello		Emmett Davis	Aiello was an interim for the season. Davis was hired from the Navy coaching staff.
Colorado State	Stew Morrill		Ritchie McKay	Morrill left to coach Utah State.
Duquesne	Scott Edgar		Darelle Porter	Edgar was let go after three seasons going 29–55.
Fairfield	Paul Cormier		Tim O'Toole	O'Toole was hired from the Seton Hall coaching staff.
George Washington	Mike Jarvis		Tom Penders	Jarvis left to coach St. John's.
Houston	Alvin Brooks		Clyde Drexler	Drexler was hired at his alma mater after retiring from the NBA.
Howard	Mike McLeese		Kirk Saulny	
Idaho State	Herb Williams		Doug Oliver	Oliver was hired from the Stanford coaching staff.
Iona	Tim Welsh		Jeff Ruland	Welsh left to coach Providence. Ruland was promoted from assistant.
Iowa State	Tim Floyd		Larry Eustachy	Floyd left to coach in the NBA for the Chicago Bulls.
Jacksonville State	Bill Jones		Mark Turgeon	Turgeon was hired from the Philadelphia 76ers coaching staff.
Liberty	Jeff Meyer	Randy Dunton	Mel Hankinson	Meyer stepped down to be assistant to the president of Liberty. Dunton was promoted from assistant. Hankinson was hired from the West Virginia coaching staff.
Louisiana Tech	Jim Wooldridge		Keith Richard	Wooldridge left to be an assistant for the Chicago Bulls. Richard was promoted from assistant to head coach.
Loyola Chicago	Ken Burmeister		Larry Farmer	Farmer was hired from the Rhode Island coaching staff.
Mississippi State	Richard Williams		Rick Stansbury	Stansbury was promoted from assistant.
Monmouth	Wayne Szoke		Dave Calloway	Szoke resigned on January 18, 1998. Calloway at first served as interim head coach, then was named permanent head coach in February 1998.
Montana	Blaine Taylor		Don Holst	
Murray State	Mark Gottfried		Tevester Anderson	Gottfried left to coach Alabama. Anderson was promoted from assistant.
Niagara	Jack Armstrong		Joe Mihalich	Mihalich was hired from the La Salle coaching staff.
Norfolk State	Michael Bernard		Mel Coleman	
Northern Iowa	Eldon Miller		Same Weaver	
Ole Miss	Rob Evans		Rod Barnes	Evans left to coach Arizona State. Barnes was promoted to head coach and coach his alma mater.
Portland State	Ritchie McKay		Joel Sobotka	McKay left to coach Colorado State.
Providence	Pete Gillen		Tim Welsh	Gillen left to coach Virginia.
Sam Houston State	Jerry Hopkins		Bob Marlin	Marlin was hired from the Alabama coaching staff.
San Jose State	Stan Morrison		Phil Johnson	Morrison resigned. Johnson was hired from the Arizona coaching staff.
Southern Illinois	Rich Herrin		Bruce Weber	Weber was hired from the Purdue coaching staff.
Tennessee Tech	Frank Harrell		Jeff Lebo	Lebo was hired from the South Carolina coaching staff.
Texas	Tom Penders		Rick Barnes	Penders left to coach George Washington.
Texas A&M	Tony Barone		Melvin Watkins	
UC Santa Barbara	Jerry Pimm		Bob Williams	Pimm resigned.
UNC Charlotte	Melvin Watkins		Bobby Lutz	Watkins left to coach Texas A&M. Lutz was promoted from assistant.
Utah State	Larry Eustachy		Stew Morrill	Eustachy left to coach Iowa State.
VCU	Sonny Smith		Mack McCarthy	Smith retired. McCarthy was promoted from associate head coach.
Virginia	Jeff Jones		Pete Gillen	
Winthrop	Dan Kenney		Gregg Marshall	Marshall ware hired from Marshall University coaching staff.
Wyoming	Larry Shyatt		Steve McClain	Shyatt left to coach Clemson. McClain was hired from the TCU coaching staff.
