= 1997–98 South Alabama Jaguars basketball team =

American college basketball season

1997–98 South Alabama Jaguars men's basketball

Sun Belt Regular season co-champions Sun Belt tournament champions

NCAA tournament, first round
- Conference: Sun Belt Conference
- Record: 21–7 (14–4 Sun Belt)
- Head coach: Bob Weltlich (1st season)
- Home arena: Mitchell Center

1997–98 Sun Belt Conference men's basketball standings
	Conf.				Overall
Team	W		L	PCT	W		L	PCT
South Alabama †	14	–	4	.778	21	–	7	.750
Arkansas State	14	–	4	.778	20	–	9	.690
Southwestern Louisiana	12	–	6	.667	18	–	13	.581
Arkansas–Little Rock	10	–	8	.556	15	–	13	.536
Louisiana Tech	9	–	9	.500	12	–	15	.444
New Orleans	9	–	9	.500	15	–	12	.556
Lamar	7	–	11	.389	15	–	14	.517
Jacksonville	6	–	12	.333	8	–	19	.296
Western Kentucky	6	–	12	.333	10	–	19	.345
Texas–Pan American	3	–	15	.167	3	–	24	.111
† 1998 Sun Belt Conference tournament winner Rankings from AP Poll

The 1997–98 South Alabama Jaguars basketball team represented the University of South Alabama as members of the Sun Belt Conference during the 1997–98 NCAA Division I men's basketball season. The Jaguars were led by head coach Bob Weltlich and played their home games at the Mitchell Center. They finished the season 21–7, 14–4 in Sun Belt play to finish in first place. They won the Sun Belt tournament to earn an automatic bid to the 1998 NCAA tournament as the 12 seed in the Southeast region. In the opening round, the Jaguars lost to No. 5 seed Illinois.

== Roster ==
1997–98 South Alabama Jaguars men's basketball team
Players	Coaches
Pos. / # / Name / Height / Weight / Year / Hometown; G / 5 / Rusty Yoder / 6 ft 1 in (1.85 m) / — / Sr	Head coach: Bob Weltlich (Ohio State); Assistant coach(es) Legend: (C) Team captain; (S) Suspended; (I) Ineligible; (W) Walk-on; Injured; Current redshirt

== Schedule and results ==
Date time, TV	Rank^{#}	Opponent^{#}	Result	Record	Site (attendance) city, state
Non-conference regular season
Nov 29, 1997*		Alcorn State	W 72–41	1–0	Jaguar Gym; Mobile, Alabama
Dec 9, 1997*		Southern Miss	L 47–52	1–1	Jaguar Gym; Mobile, Alabama
Dec 12, 1997*		vs. Alcorn State; Indiana Classic	W 52–42	2–1	Assembly Hall; Bloomington, Indiana
Dec 13, 1997*		at Indiana; Indiana Classic	L 56–64	2–2	Assembly Hall; Bloomington, Indiana
Dec 16, 1997*		at Kansas City	W 79–52	3–2	Municipal Auditorium; Kansas City, Missouri
Dec 22, 1997*		Washington	W 69–52	4–2	Jaguar Gym; Mobile, Alabama
Sun Belt Regular season
Dec 28, 1997		at Arkansas State	L 66–82 ^{OT}	4–3 (0–1)	First National Bank Arena; Jonesboro, Arkansas
Jan 3, 1998		at Jacksonville	W 72–59	5–3 (1–1)	Jacksonville Coliseum; Jacksonville, Florida
Jan 5, 1998		Lamar	W 48–44	6–3 (2–1)	Jaguar Gym; Mobile, Alabama
Jan 8, 1998		Arkansas–Little Rock	W 68–49	7–3 (3–1)	Jaguar Gym; Mobile, Alabama
Jan 10, 1998		Western Kentucky	W 68–48	8–3 (4–1)	Jaguar Gym; Mobile, Alabama
Jan 15, 1998		Louisiana Tech	W 61–50	9–3 (5–1)	Jaguar Gym; Mobile, Alabama
Jan 17, 1998		Arkansas State	W 78–68	10–3 (6–1)	Jaguar Gym; Mobile, Alabama
Jan 24, 1998		at Louisiana Tech	W 62–48	11–3 (7–1)	Thomas Assembly Center; Ruston, Louisiana
Jan 26, 1998		at New Orleans	L 55–71	11–4 (7–2)	Lakefront Arena; New Orleans, Louisiana
Jan 29, 1998		Jacksonville	W 52–31	12–4 (8–2)	Jaguar Gym; Mobile, Alabama
Jan 31, 1998; 7:35 pm		Texas–Rio Grande Valley	W 105–70	13–4 (9–2)	Jaguar Gym; Mobile, Alabama
Feb 5, 1998		at Southwestern Louisiana	L 53–67	13–5 (9–3)	Cajundome; Lafayette, Louisiana
Feb 7, 1998		at Lamar	L 62–66	13–6 (9–4)	Montagne Center; Beaumont, Texas
Feb 10, 1998		Southwestern Louisiana	W 71–55	14–6 (10–4)	Jaguar Gym; Mobile, Alabama
Feb 14, 1998		New Orleans	W 68–50	15–6 (11–4)	Jaguar Gym; Mobile, Alabama
Feb 19, 1998; 7:30 pm		at Texas–Rio Grande Valley	W 87–54	16–6 (12–4)	UTPA Fieldhouse; Edinburg, Texas
Feb 21, 1998		at Western Kentucky	W 55–50	17–6 (13–4)	E.A. Diddle Arena; Bowling Green, Kentucky
Feb 23, 1998		at Arkansas–Little Rock	W 61–43	18–6 (14–4)	Barton Coliseum; Little Rock, Arkansas
Sun Belt Conference tournament
Feb 28, 1998*	(1)	vs. (9) Western Kentucky; Quarterfinals	W 61–47	19–6	Cajundome; Lafayette, Louisiana
Mar 1, 1998*	(1)	vs. (4) Arkansas–Little Rock; Semifinals	W 79–48	20–6	Cajundome; Lafayette, Louisiana
Mar 3, 1998*	(1)	at (3) Southwestern Louisiana; Championship game	W 62–59	21–6	Cajundome; Lafayette, Louisiana
NCAA tournament
Mar 12, 1998*	(12 W)	vs. (5 W) No. 22 Illinois; First round	L 51–64	21–7	ARCO Arena (14,920); Sacramento, California
*Non-conference game. ^{#}Rankings from AP Poll. (#) Tournament seedings in parentheses. W=West. All times are in Central Time.
