= 1997–98 Marquette Golden Eagles men's basketball team =

American college basketball season

1997–98 Marquette Golden Eagles men's basketball

NIT Tournament, Quarterfinals
- Conference: Conference USA
- American
- Record: 20–11 (8—8 CUSA)
- Head coach: Mike Deane (4th season)
- Home arena: Bradley Center

1997–98 Conference USA men's basketball standings
	Conf.				Overall
Team	W		L	PCT	W		L	PCT
American
No. 9 Cincinnati †	14	–	2	.875	27	–	6	.818
UNC Charlotte	13	–	3	.813	20	–	11	.645
Saint Louis	11	–	5	.688	22	–	11	.667
Marquette	8	–	8	.500	20	–	11	.645
Louisville	5	–	11	.313	12	–	20	.375
DePaul	3	–	13	.188	7	–	23	.233
National
Memphis	12	–	4	.750	17	–	12	.586
UAB	10	–	6	.625	21	–	12	.636
Southern Miss	9	–	7	.563	22	–	11	.667
South Florida	7	–	9	.438	17	–	13	.567
Houston	2	–	14	.125	9	–	20	.310
Tulane	2	–	14	.125	7	–	22	.241
† 1998 Conference USA Tournament winner Rankings from AP Poll

The 1997–98 Marquette Golden Eagles men's basketball team represented the Marquette University in the 1997–98 season. The Golden Eagles finished the regular season with a record of 20–11, 8–8 in their conference. The Golden Eagles were led by fourth year Mike Deane and received an invitation to the NIT.

== Roster ==
1997–98 Marquette Golden Eagles men's basketball team
Players
Coaches

Pos.	#	Name	Height	Weight	Year	Hometown
C	45	Jarrod Lovette	6 ft 10 in (2.08 m)	245 lb (111 kg)	Jr	Blair, Wisconsin
F	32	Bart Miller	6 ft 5 in (1.96 m)	205 lb (93 kg)	So	Brandenburg, Kentucky
C	35	John Mueller	6 ft 11 in (2.11 m)	232 lb (105 kg)	Fr	Cedarburg, Wisconsin
G	22	Brian Wardle	6 ft 5 in (1.96 m)	212 lb (96 kg)	Fr	Clarendon Hills, Illinois

Head coach

- Mike Deane

Assistant coach(es)

- Bo Ellis
- Dan Theiss

Legend

- (C) Team captain
- (S) Suspended
- (I) Ineligible
- (W) Walk-on
- Injured
- Current redshirt

== Schedule ==
Date time, TV	Rank^{#}	Opponent^{#}	Result	Record	Site city, state
November 14*		at Wisconsin	W 65–60	1–0	Wisconsin Field House; Madison, Wisconsin
November 21*		Notre Dame	W 72–48	2–0	Bradley Center; Milwaukee, Wisconsin
December 5*		Montana State	W 84–60	3–0	Bradley Center; Milwaukee, Wisconsin
December 6*		St. Bonaventure	W 68–61	4–0	Bradley Center; Milwaukee, Wisconsin
December 14*		UW Milwaukee	W 69–56	5–0	Bradley Center; Milwaukee, Wisconsin
December 21*		Dayton	W 86–68	6–0	Bradley Center; Milwaukee, Wisconsin
December 23*		UCF	W 85–58	7–0	Bradley Center; Milwaukee, Wisconsin
December 28*		at UIC	W 73–67	8–0	UIC Pavilion; Chicago, Illinois
December 31*		Saint Peter's	W 71–55	9–0	Bradley Center; Milwaukee, Wisconsin
January 3		at Louisville	W 71–70	10–0 (1–0)	Freedom Hall; Louisville, Kentucky
January 7	No. 20	UAB	L 52–65	10–1 (1–1)	Bradley Center (10,938); Milwaukee, Wisconsin
January 11		at Cincinnati	L 51–68	10–2 (1–2)	Fifth Third Arena; Cincinnati, Ohio
January 13		at Charlotte	L 53–66	10–3 (1–3)	Dale F. Halton Arena; Charlotte, NC
January 17*		Boston College	L 54–64	10–4 (1–3)	Bradley Center; Milwaukee, Wisconsin
January 19		DePaul	W 58–49	11–4 (2–3)	Bradley Center; Milwaukee, Wisconsin
January 22		No. 21 Cincinnati	W 66–63 ^{OT}	12–4 (3–3)	Bradley Center; Milwaukee, Wisconsin
January 24		Saint Louis	L 62–71	12–5 (3–4)	Bradley Center; Milwaukee, Wisconsin
January 29		at Southern Miss	W 46–43	13–5 (4–4)	Reed Green Coliseum; Hattiesburg, Mississippi
February 1		at Tulane	W 66–40	14–5 (5–4)	Avron B. Fogelman Arena; New Orleans, Louisiana
February 7		at DePaul	W 73–51	15–5 (6–4)	Rosemont Horizon; Rosemont, Illinois
February 12		Charlotte	L 56–58	15–6 (6–5)	Bradley Center; Milwaukee, Wisconsin
February 14		Houston	W 70–52	16–6 (7–5)	Bradley Center; Milwaukee, Wisconsin
February 19		Louisville	W 57–52	17–6 (8–5)	Bradley Center; Milwaukee, Wisconsin
February 22		at South Florida	L 53–57	17–7 (8–6)	Sun Dome; Tampa, Florida
February 25		at Saint Louis	L 65–67	17–8 (8–7)	Kiel Center; St. Louis, Missouri
February 27		Memphis	L 65–77	17–9 (8–8)	Bradley Center; Milwaukee, Wisconsin
Conference USA Tournament
March 4		vs. DePaul	W 52–50	18–9 (8–8)	Fifth Third Arena; Cincinnati, Ohio
March 5		vs. Charlotte	L 55–63	18–10 (8–8)	Fifth Third Arena; Cincinnati, Ohio
NIT
March 11*		Creighton	W 80–68	19–10 (8–8)	Bradley Center; Milwaukee, Wisconsin
March 16*		Auburn	W 75–60 ^{OT}	20–10 (8–8)	Bradley Center; Milwaukee, Wisconsin
March 18*		at Minnesota	L 71–73	20–11 (8–8)	Williams Arena; Minneapolis, Minnesota
*Non-conference game. ^{#}Rankings from AP Poll. (#) Tournament seedings in parentheses.
