= 1998 Sun Belt Conference men's basketball tournament =

- Classification: Division I
- Season: 1997–98
- Teams: 10
- Site: Cajundome; Lafayette, LA
- Champions: South Alabama (4th title)
- Winning coach: Bob Weltlich (1st title)
- MVP: Toby Madison (South Alabama)

1997–98 Sun Belt Conference men's basketball standings
	Conf.				Overall
Team	W		L	PCT	W		L	PCT
South Alabama †	14	–	4	.778	21	–	7	.750
Arkansas State	14	–	4	.778	20	–	9	.690
Southwestern Louisiana	12	–	6	.667	18	–	13	.581
Arkansas–Little Rock	10	–	8	.556	15	–	13	.536
Louisiana Tech	9	–	9	.500	12	–	15	.444
New Orleans	9	–	9	.500	15	–	12	.556
Lamar	7	–	11	.389	15	–	14	.517
Jacksonville	6	–	12	.333	8	–	19	.296
Western Kentucky	6	–	12	.333	10	–	19	.345
Texas–Pan American	3	–	15	.167	3	–	24	.111
† 1998 Sun Belt Conference tournament winner Rankings from AP Poll

The 1998 Sun Belt Conference men's basketball tournament was held February 27–March 3 at the Cajundome at the University of Southwestern Louisiana in Lafayette, Louisiana.

Top-seeded South Alabama defeated hosts Southwestern Louisiana in the championship game, 62–59, to win their fourth overall, and second consecutive, Sun Belt men's basketball tournament.

The Jaguars, in turn, received an automatic bid to the 1998 NCAA tournament. No other Sun Belt members earned bids to the tournament.

== Format ==
No teams left or joined the Sun Belt before the season, leaving conference membership fixed at ten teams.

All teams participated in the tournament, maintaining its ten-team format. With all teams seeded based on regular-season conference records, the top six teams were all placed directly into the quarterfinal round while the four lowest-seeded teams were placed into the preliminary first round.

== Bracket ==
First round Friday, February 27
9	Western Kentucky	75
8	Jacksonville	70
7	Lamar	103
10	Texas–Pan American	89

Quarterfinals; Saturday, February 28
1	South Alabama	61
9	Western Kentucky	47
5	Louisiana Tech	61
4	Arkansas–Little Rock	74
3	Southwestern Louisiana	76
6	New Orleans	69
7	Lamar	70
2	Arkansas State	54

Semifinals; Sunday, March 1
1	South Alabama	79
4	Arkansas–Little Rock	48
3	Southwestern Louisiana	81
7	Lamar	65

Championship; Tuesday, March 3
1	South Alabama	62
3	Southwestern Louisiana	59

== See also ==
- Sun Belt Conference women's basketball tournament
