= 1997–98 Cincinnati Bearcats men's basketball team =

American college basketball season

1997–98 Cincinnati Bearcats men's basketball

Conference USA regular season champions Conference USA tournament champions

NCAA tournament, second round
- Conference: Conference USA
- American

Ranking
- Coaches: No. 14
- AP: No. 9
- Record: 27–6 (14–2 C-USA)
- Head coach: Bob Huggins (9th season)
- Assistant coach: Mick Cronin (2nd season)
- Home arena: Myrl Shoemaker Center

1997–98 Conference USA men's basketball standings
	Conf.				Overall
Team	W		L	PCT	W		L	PCT
American
No. 9 Cincinnati †	14	–	2	.875	27	–	6	.818
UNC Charlotte	13	–	3	.813	20	–	11	.645
Saint Louis	11	–	5	.688	22	–	11	.667
Marquette	8	–	8	.500	20	–	11	.645
Louisville	5	–	11	.313	12	–	20	.375
DePaul	3	–	13	.188	7	–	23	.233
National
Memphis	12	–	4	.750	17	–	12	.586
UAB	10	–	6	.625	21	–	12	.636
Southern Miss	9	–	7	.563	22	–	11	.667
South Florida	7	–	9	.438	17	–	13	.567
Houston	2	–	14	.125	9	–	20	.310
Tulane	2	–	14	.125	7	–	22	.241
† 1998 Conference USA Tournament winner Rankings from AP Poll

The 1997–98 Cincinnati Bearcats men's basketball team represented University of Cincinnati as a member of Conference USA during the 1997–98 NCAA Division I men's basketball season. The head coach was Bob Huggins, serving in his 9th year at the school. The team won regular season and Conference USA tournament titles to earn an automatic bid to the NCAA tournament as No. 2 seed in the West region. After an opening round victory over Northern Arizona, Cincinnati was upset in the second round by West Virginia, 75–74. The Bearcats finished with a 27–6 record (14–2 C-USA).

== Roster ==
1997–98 Cincinnati Bearcats men's basketball team
Players
Coaches

Pos.	#	Name	Height	Weight	Year	Hometown
G	5	D'Juan Baker	6 ft 2 in (1.88 m)	—	Jr
F	34	Bobby Brannen	6 ft 7 in (2.01 m)	—	Sr	Cincinnati, Ohio
F	34	John Carson	6 ft 1 in (1.85 m)	—	So	Springfield, Ohio
G	14	David Dissinger	6 ft 4 in (1.93 m)	185 lb (84 kg)	Fr	Cincinnati, Ohio
F	24	Ryan Fletcher	6 ft 9 in (2.06 m)	245 lb (111 kg)	RS So	Franklin, Ohio
F		Michael Horton	6 ft 1 in (1.85 m)	—	Jr
F		Brad Jackson (W)	6 ft 1 in (1.85 m)	—	Jr	Canton, Ohio
G	21	Melvin Levett	6 ft 3 in (1.91 m)	—	Fr	Cleveland, Ohio
C	4	Kenyon Martin	6 ft 9 in (2.06 m)	230 lb (104 kg)	So	Saginaw, Michigan
G		Alex Meachum (W)	6 ft 0 in (1.83 m)	—	Jr	Cincinnati, Ohio
G		Shawn Myrick	6 ft 1 in (1.85 m)	—	Jr
F	23	Ruben Patterson	6 ft 5 in (1.96 m)	—	Jr	Cleveland, Ohio
G		Brent Petrus	6 ft 4 in (1.93 m)	—	Fr	Elyria, Ohio
F	5	Jermaine Tate (I)	6 ft 9 in (2.06 m)	235 lb (107 kg)	RS So	Toledo, Ohio
G	42	Steven London (I)	6 ft 1 in (1.85 m)	175 lb (79 kg)	RS Fr	Louisville, KY

Head coach

Bob Huggins

Assistant coach(es)

- Mick Cronin

Legend

- (C) Team captain
- (S) Suspended
- (I) Ineligible
- (W) Walk-on
- Injured
- Current redshirt

== Schedule and results ==
Date time, TV	Rank^{#}	Opponent^{#}	Result	Record	Site city, state
Regular Season
Nov 17, 1997*		Detroit	W 76–66	1–0	Myrl Shoemaker Center; Cincinnati, Ohio
Nov 19, 1997*		Arizona State	L 79–87	1–1	Myrl Shoemaker Center; Cincinnati, Ohio
Nov 30, 1997*		Morehead State	W 87–57	2–1	Myrl Shoemaker Center; Cincinnati, Ohio
Dec 3, 1997*		Alcorn State	W 90–76	3–1	Myrl Shoemaker Center; Cincinnati, Ohio
Dec 6, 1997*		Wright State	W 85–60	4–1	Myrl Shoemaker Center; Cincinnati, Ohio
Dec 13, 1997*		at No. 7 Xavier	L 68–88	4–2	Cincinnati Gardens; Cincinnati, Ohio
Dec 17, 1997*		Minnesota	W 81–71	5–2	Myrl Shoemaker Center; Cincinnati, Ohio
Dec 20, 1997*		Eastern Kentucky	W 106–53	6–2	Myrl Shoemaker Center; Cincinnati, Ohio
Dec 27, 1997*		vs. UMass; Gatorade Rock 'n Roll Shootout	W 74–66 ^{OT}	7–2	Gund Arena (12,324); Cleveland, Ohio
Dec 30, 1997*		Winthrop	W 79–36	8–2	Myrl Shoemaker Center; Cincinnati, Ohio
Jan 4, 1998		at Houston	W 81–68	9–2 (1–0)	Hofheinz Pavilion; Houston, Texas
Jan 8, 1998		Memphis	W 61–54	10–2 (2–0)	Myrl Shoemaker Center; Cincinnati, Ohio
Jan 11, 1998		No. 20 Marquette	W 68–51	11–2 (3–0)	Myrl Shoemaker Center; Cincinnati, Ohio
Jan 15, 1998		Southern Miss	W 77–61	12–2 (4–0)	Myrl Shoemaker Center; Cincinnati, Ohio
Jan 18, 1998		at Louisville	W 71–57	13–2 (5–0)	Freedom Hall; Louisville, Kentucky
Jan 20, 1998	No. 21	at Tulane	W 60–50	14–2 (6–0)	Avron B. Fogelman Arena; New Orleans, Louisiana
Jan 22, 1998	No. 21	at Marquette	L 63–66 ^{OT}	14–3 (6–1)	Bradley Center; Milwaukee, Wisconsin
Jan 25, 1998*	No. 21	No. 22 Rhode Island	W 88–82	15–3	Myrl Shoemaker Center; Cincinnati, Ohio
Jan 29, 1998	No. 18	Louisville	W 67–61	16–3 (7–1)	Myrl Shoemaker Center; Cincinnati, Ohio
Feb 1, 1998*	No. 18	at No. 13 South Carolina	L 65–67	16–4	Carolina Coliseum; Columbia, South Carolina
Feb 5, 1998	No. 20	at DePaul	W 109–73	17–4 (8–1)	Rosemont Horizon; Rosemont, Illinois
Feb 7, 1998	No. 20	at UNC Charlotte	L 62–69	17–5 (8–2)	Dale F. Halton Arena; Charlotte, North Carolina
Feb 12, 1998	No. 19	at Saint Louis	W 70–43	18–5 (9–2)	Kiel Center; St. Louis, Missouri
Feb 14, 1998	No. 19	South Florida	W 72–55	19–5 (10–2)	Myrl Shoemaker Center; Cincinnati, Ohio
Feb 19, 1998	No. 17	at UAB	W 93–76	20–5 (11–2)	Bartow Arena (7,185); Birmingham, Alabama
Feb 21, 1998	No. 17	DePaul	W 75–38	21–5 (12–2)	Myrl Shoemaker Center; Cincinnati, Ohio
Feb 26, 1998	No. 17	UNC Charlotte	W 68–67	22–5 (13–2)	Myrl Shoemaker Center; Cincinnati, Ohio
Feb 28, 1998	No. 17	Saint Louis	W 61–58	23–5 (14–2)	Myrl Shoemaker Center; Cincinnati, Ohio
Conference USA Tournament
Mar 5, 1998*	(1) No. 14	(9) Louisville; Quarterfinals	W 64–50	24–5	Myrl Shoemaker Center; Cincinnati, Ohio
Mar 6, 1998*	(1) No. 14	(4) UAB; Semifinals	W 100–85	25–5	Myrl Shoemaker Center (13,000); Cincinnati, Ohio
Mar 7, 1998*	(1) No. 14	(2) Charlotte; Championship Game	W 71–57	26–5	Myrl Shoemaker Center; Cincinnati, Ohio
NCAA Tournament
Mar 12, 1998*	(2 W) No. 9	vs. (15 W) Northern Arizona; First Round	W 65–62	27–5	BSU Pavilion; Boise, Idaho
Mar 14, 1998*	(2 W) No. 9	vs. (10 W) West Virginia; Second Round	L 74–75	27–6	BSU Pavilion; Boise, Idaho
*Non-conference game. ^{#}Rankings from AP poll. (#) Tournament seedings in parentheses. W=West. All times are in Eastern Time.

== Rankings ==
Ranking movements Legend: ██ Increase in ranking ██ Decrease in ranking — = Not ranked
	Week																		
Poll	Pre	1	2	3	4	5	6	7	8	9	10	11	12	13	14	15	16	17	Final
AP	—	—	—	—	—	—	—	—	—	—	21	18	20	19	17	17	14	9	Not released
Coaches	—	—	—	—	—	—	—	—	—	—	25	20	20	21	18	17	13	11	14

^Coaches did not release a Week 1 poll.
*AP did not release post-NCAA Tournament rankings
