= 1998 Conference USA men's basketball tournament =

- Classification: Division I
- Season: 1997–98
- Teams: 12
- Site: Myrl H. Shoemaker Center; Cincinnati, OH
- Champions: Cincinnati (2nd title)
- Winning coach: Bob Huggins (2nd title)
- MVP: Kenyon Martin (Cincinnati)

1997–98 Conference USA men's basketball standings
	Conf.				Overall
Team	W		L	PCT	W		L	PCT
American
No. 9 Cincinnati †	14	–	2	.875	27	–	6	.818
UNC Charlotte	13	–	3	.813	20	–	11	.645
Saint Louis	11	–	5	.688	22	–	11	.667
Marquette	8	–	8	.500	20	–	11	.645
Louisville	5	–	11	.313	12	–	20	.375
DePaul	3	–	13	.188	7	–	23	.233
National
Memphis	12	–	4	.750	17	–	12	.586
UAB	10	–	6	.625	21	–	12	.636
Southern Miss	9	–	7	.563	22	–	11	.667
South Florida	7	–	9	.438	17	–	13	.567
Houston	2	–	14	.125	9	–	20	.310
Tulane	2	–	14	.125	7	–	22	.241
† 1998 Conference USA Tournament winner Rankings from AP Poll

The 1998 Conference USA men's basketball tournament was held March 4–7 at the Myrl H. Shoemaker Center in Cincinnati, Ohio.

Top-seeded Cincinnati defeated UNC Charlotte in the championship game, 71–57, to clinch their second Conference USA men's tournament championship.

The Bearcats, in turn, received an automatic bid to the 1998 NCAA tournament. They were joined in the tournament by fellow C-USA members UNC Charlotte and Saint Louis, who earned at-large bids.

== Format ==
Prior to the season, Conference USA dropped their old regular season scheduling format of three divisions of four teams (Red, White, and Blue) in favor of two six-team divisions (American and National). Teams were largely divided based on geography.

However, since division standings were not utilized for seeding teams in the conference tournament, no changes were made to the tournament format from the previous year. The top four teams were given byes into the quarterfinal round, and the remaining eight teams were entered into the preliminary round. All seeds were determined by overall regular season conference records.

== Bracket ==
First round Wednesday, March 4
9	Louisville	75
8	South Florida	64
5	Saint Louis	71
12	Tulane	53
11	Houston	57
6	Southern Miss	73
7	Marquette	52
10	DePaul	50

Quarterfinals; Thursday, March 5
1	#14 Cincinnati	64
9	Louisville	50
5	Saint Louis	74
4	UAB	76
3	Memphis	57
6	Southern Miss	85
7	Marquette	55
2	UNC Charlotte	63

Semifinals; Friday, March 6
1	#14 Cincinnati	100
4	UAB	85
6	Southern Miss	53
2	UNC Charlotte	65

Championship; Saturday, March 7
1	#14 Cincinnati	71
2	UNC Charlotte	57
