= 1997–98 Utah State Aggies men's basketball team =

American college basketball season

1997–98 Utah State Aggies men's basketball
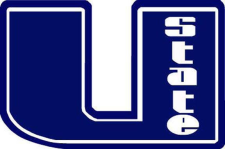

Big West tournament champions Big West East Division champions

NCAA tournament, first round
- Conference: Big West Conference
- East
- Record: 25–8 (13–3 Big West)
- Head coach: Larry Eustachy (5th season)
- Associate head coach: Steve Barnes (2nd season)
- Home arena: Smith Spectrum

1997–98 Big West men's basketball standings
	Conf.				Overall
Team	W		L	PCT	W		L	PCT
East Division
Utah State†	13	–	3	.813	25	–	8	.758
Nevada	11	–	5	.688	16	–	12	.571
Boise State	9	–	7	.563	17	–	13	.567
Idaho	9	–	7	.563	15	–	12	.556
New Mexico State	8	–	8	.500	18	–	12	.600
North Texas	4	–	12	.250	5	–	21	.192
West Division
Pacific	14	–	2	.875	23	–	10	.697
Cal Poly	7	–	9	.438	14	–	14	.500
Cal State Fullerton	6	–	10	.375	12	–	16	.429
UC Irvine	6	–	10	.375	9	–	18	.333
Long Beach State	5	–	11	.313	10	–	19	.345
UC Santa Barbara	4	–	12	.250	7	–	19	.269
† 1998 Big West tournament winner As of April 10, 1998; Rankings from AP poll

The 1997–98 Utah State Aggies men's basketball team represented Utah State University in the 1997–98 college basketball season. This was head coach Larry Eustachy's 5th and final season at Utah State. The Aggies played their home games at the Dee Glen Smith Spectrum and were members of the Big West Conference. They finished the season 25–8, 13–3 to finish atop the conference standings in the East division. They also won the Big West tournament to earn an automatic bid to the 1998 NCAA Division I men's basketball tournament as No. 13 seed in the West Region. The Aggies lost to No. 4 seed Maryland in the first round.

== Roster ==
1997–98 Utah State Aggies men's basketball team
Players
Coaches

Pos.	#	Name	Height	Weight	Year	Hometown
G	3	Marcus Saxon	6 ft 2 in (1.88 m)	201 lb (91 kg)	Sr		Columbia, South Carolina
G/F	4	Kevin Rice	6 ft 3 in (1.91 m)	196 lb (89 kg)	Sr		San Antonio, Texas
G	5	Justin Jones	6 ft 3 in (1.91 m)	187 lb (85 kg)	Sr		Malad, Idaho

Head coach

- Larry Eustachy

Assistant coach(es)

Legend

- (C) Team captain
- (S) Suspended
- (I) Ineligible
- (W) Walk-on
- Injured
- Current redshirt

Roster

== Schedule and results ==
Date time, TV	Rank^{#}	Opponent^{#}	Result	Record	Site (attendance) city, state
Non-conference regular season
Nov 14, 1997*		Simon Fraser	W 79–67	1–0	Smith Spectrum; Logan, Utah
Nov 17, 1997*		at Minnesota; Preseason NIT	W 75–64	2–0	Williams Arena; Minneapolis, Minnesota
Nov 19, 1997*		at Florida State; Preseason NIT	L 55–66	2–1	Donald L. Tucker Center; Tallahassee, Florida
Nov 22, 1997*		Southern Oregon	W 111–61	3–1	Smith Spectrum; Logan, Utah
Nov 29, 1997*		BYU	W 72–69	4–1	Smith Spectrum; Logan, Utah
Dec 3, 1997*		at Wyoming	L 61–67	4–2	Arena-Auditorium; Laramie, Wyoming
Dec 6, 1997*		vs. San Diego State	W 64–61	5–2	Salt Lake City, Utah
Dec 10, 1997*		at No. 9 Utah	L 55–71	5–3	Jon M. Huntsman Center; Salt Lake City, Utah
Dec 20, 1997*		Long Island	W 100–84	6–3	Smith Spectrum; Logan, Utah
Dec 27, 1997*		Weber State	W 71–65	7–3	Smith Spectrum; Logan, Utah
Dec 30, 1997*		Fresno Pacific; Gossner Classic	W 69–51	8–3	Smith Spectrum; Logan, Utah
Dec 31, 1997*		Radford; Gossner Classic	W 80–73 ^{3OT}	9–3	Smith Spectrum; Logan, Utah
Jan 3, 1998*		at Colorado State	L 59–68	9–4	Moby Arena; Fort Collins, Colorado
Big West Regular Season
Jan 8, 1998		Pacific	W 70–62	10–4 (1–0)	Smith Spectrum; Logan, Utah
Jan 10, 1998		Long Beach State	W 69–55	11–4 (2–0)	Smith Spectrum; Logan, Utah
Jan 15, 1998		at Cal Poly	W 91–88 ^{OT}	12–4 (3–0)	Mott Gym; San Luis Obispo, California
Jan 17, 1998		at UC Santa Barbara	W 69–66 ^{OT}	13–4 (4–0)	UC Santa Barbara Events Center; Santa Barbara, California
Jan 22, 1998		Boise State	W 70–41	14–4 (5–0)	Smith Spectrum; Logan, Utah
Jan 24, 1998		Idaho	W 68–66	15–4 (6–0)	Smith Spectrum; Logan, Utah
Jan 29, 1998		at North Texas	W 79–64	16–4 (7–0)	UNT Coliseum; Denton, Texas
Jan 31, 1998		at New Mexico State	L 69–74	16–5 (7–1)	Pan American Center; Las Cruces, New Mexico
Feb 5, 1998		Nevada	W 74–52	17–5 (8–1)	Smith Spectrum; Logan, Utah
Feb 7, 1998		Cal State Fullerton	W 69–44	18–5 (9–1)	Smith Spectrum; Logan, Utah
Feb 12, 1998		at UC Irvine	W 60–51	19–5 (10–1)	Bren Events Center (1,679); Irvine, California
Feb 14, 1998		at Nevada	L 62–73	19–6 (10–2)	Lawlor Events Center; Reno, Nevada
Feb 19, 1998		at Idaho	W 59–50	20–6 (11–2)	Kibbie Dome; Moscow, Idaho
Feb 21, 1998		at Boise State	L 49–57	20–7 (11–3)	ExtraMile Arena; Boise, Idaho
Feb 26, 1998		New Mexico State	W 84–82 ^{OT}	21–7 (12–3)	Smith Spectrum; Logan, Utah
Feb 28, 1998		North Texas	W 102–76	22–7 (13–3)	Smith Spectrum; Logan, Utah
Big West tournament
Mar 6, 1998*	(E1)	vs. (W4) Long Beach State; Quarterfinals	W 69–61	23–7	Lawlor Events Center; Reno, Nevada
Mar 7, 1998*	(E1)	vs. (W2) Cal State Fullerton; Semifinals	W 65–56	24–7	Lawlor Events Center; Reno, Nevada
Mar 8, 1998*	(E1)	vs. (W1) Pacific; Championship game	W 78–63	25–7	Lawlor Events Center; Reno, Nevada
NCAA tournament
Mar 12, 1998*	(13 W)	vs. (4 W) No. 20 Maryland; First round	L 68–82	25–8	ARCO Arena; Sacramento, California
*Non-conference game. ^{#}Rankings from AP poll. (#) Tournament seedings in parentheses. W=West. All times are in Mountain.
