= 1998 Big West Conference men's basketball tournament =

- Classification: Division I
- Season: 1997–98
- Teams: 8
- Site: Lawlor Events Center; Reno, NV
- Champions: Utah State (2nd title)
- Winning coach: Larry Eustachy (1st title)
- MVP: Marcus Saxon (Utah State)

1997–98 Big West men's basketball standings
	Conf.				Overall
Team	W		L	PCT	W		L	PCT
East Division
Utah State†	13	–	3	.813	25	–	8	.758
Nevada	11	–	5	.688	16	–	12	.571
Boise State	9	–	7	.563	17	–	13	.567
Idaho	9	–	7	.563	15	–	12	.556
New Mexico State	8	–	8	.500	18	–	12	.600
North Texas	4	–	12	.250	5	–	21	.192
West Division
Pacific	14	–	2	.875	23	–	10	.697
Cal Poly	7	–	9	.438	14	–	14	.500
Cal State Fullerton	6	–	10	.375	12	–	16	.429
UC Irvine	6	–	10	.375	9	–	18	.333
Long Beach State	5	–	11	.313	10	–	19	.345
UC Santa Barbara	4	–	12	.250	7	–	19	.269
† 1998 Big West tournament winner As of April 10, 1998; Rankings from AP poll

The 1998 Big West Conference men's basketball tournament was held March 6–8 at Lawlor Events Center in Reno, Nevada.

Utah State defeated Pacific in the championship game, 78–63, to obtain the second Big West Conference Men's Basketball Tournament championship in school history. This was the first time Utah State won the title since 1988.

The Aggies participated in the 1998 NCAA Division I men's basketball tournament after earning the conference's automatic bid.

== Format ==
Eight of the 12 teams in the conference participated, with Cal Poly, New Mexico State, North Texas, and UC Santa Barbara not qualifying. The top eight teams were seeded based on regular season conference records.

== Bracket ==
Quarterfinals; Friday, March 6
W1	Pacific	82
E4	Idaho	74
W3	UC Irvine	72
E2	Nevada	81
E3	Boise State	82
W2	Cal State Fullerton	89
W4	Long Beach State	61
E1	Utah State	69

Semifinals; Saturday, March 7
W1	Pacific	67
E2	Nevada	62
W2	Cal State Fullerton	56
E1	Utah State	65

Championship; Sunday, March 8
W1	Pacific	63
E1	Utah State	78
