= 1997–98 Louisville Cardinals men's basketball team =

American college basketball season

1997–98 Louisville Cardinals men's basketball
- Conference: Conference USA
- Record: 12–20 (5–11 CUSA)
- Head coach: Denny Crum (27th season)
- Home arena: Freedom Hall

1997–98 Conference USA men's basketball standings
	Conf.				Overall
Team	W		L	PCT	W		L	PCT
American
No. 9 Cincinnati †	14	–	2	.875	27	–	6	.818
UNC Charlotte	13	–	3	.813	20	–	11	.645
Saint Louis	11	–	5	.688	22	–	11	.667
Marquette	8	–	8	.500	20	–	11	.645
Louisville	5	–	11	.313	12	–	20	.375
DePaul	3	–	13	.188	7	–	23	.233
National
Memphis	12	–	4	.750	17	–	12	.586
UAB	10	–	6	.625	21	–	12	.636
Southern Miss	9	–	7	.563	22	–	11	.667
South Florida	7	–	9	.438	17	–	13	.567
Houston	2	–	14	.125	9	–	20	.310
Tulane	2	–	14	.125	7	–	22	.241
† 1998 Conference USA Tournament winner Rankings from AP Poll

The 1997–98 Louisville Cardinals men's basketball team represented the University of Louisville in the 1997–98 NCAA Division I men's basketball season. The head coach was Denny Crum and the team finished the season with an overall record of 12–20.
