= 1997–98 Southern Miss Golden Eagles basketball team =

American college basketball season

1997–98 Southern Miss Golden Eagles men's basketball

NIT, First Round
- Conference: Conference USA
- Record: 22–11 (9–7 C-USA)
- Head coach: James Green (2nd season)
- Home arena: Reed Green Coliseum

1997–98 Conference USA men's basketball standings
	Conf.				Overall
Team	W		L	PCT	W		L	PCT
American
No. 9 Cincinnati †	14	–	2	.875	27	–	6	.818
UNC Charlotte	13	–	3	.813	20	–	11	.645
Saint Louis	11	–	5	.688	22	–	11	.667
Marquette	8	–	8	.500	20	–	11	.645
Louisville	5	–	11	.313	12	–	20	.375
DePaul	3	–	13	.188	7	–	23	.233
National
Memphis	12	–	4	.750	17	–	12	.586
UAB	10	–	6	.625	21	–	12	.636
Southern Miss	9	–	7	.563	22	–	11	.667
South Florida	7	–	9	.438	17	–	13	.567
Houston	2	–	14	.125	9	–	20	.310
Tulane	2	–	14	.125	7	–	22	.241
† 1998 Conference USA Tournament winner Rankings from AP Poll

The 1997–98 Southern Miss Golden Eagles basketball team represented University of Southern Mississippi in the 1997–98 college basketball season.

== Roster ==
1997–98 Southern Miss Golden Eagles men's basketball team
Players
Coaches

Pos.	#	Name	Height	Weight	Year	Hometown
F		Kelly McCarty	6 ft 7 in (2.01 m)	—	Sr	Quitman, Mississippi
G		Jimmie Floyd	6 ft 4 in (1.93 m)	—	Sr
C		Vandarel Jones	6 ft 9 in (2.06 m)	—	Fr
F		Pedro Phillips	6 ft 5 in (1.96 m)	—	Jr
G		Mel Cauthen	6 ft 0 in (1.83 m)	—	Fr
F		Anthony Richards	6 ft 9 in (2.06 m)	—	Jr
F		Rod Agee	6 ft 5 in (1.96 m)	—	Sr
G		Arthur Stapleton	6 ft 3 in (1.91 m)	—	Jr
G		Kevin Winn	6 ft 3 in (1.91 m)	—	Jr
C		Eric Lee	6 ft 10 in (2.08 m)	—	Jr
G		Robert Lewis	6 ft 3 in (1.91 m)	—	Jr
F		Adalius Thomas	6 ft 4 in (1.93 m)	—	So
G		Juan Bragg	6 ft 1 in (1.85 m)	—	Jr
G		Phillip Prince	6 ft 0 in (1.83 m)	—	So
F		Neal Broome	6 ft 7 in (2.01 m)	—	Fr

Head coach

- James Green

Assistant coach(es)

Legend

- (C) Team captain
- (S) Suspended
- (I) Ineligible
- (W) Walk-on
- Injured
- Current redshirt

Roster

== Schedule and results ==
Date time, TV	Rank^{#}	Opponent^{#}	Result	Record	Site city, state
Non-conference regular season
Nov 17, 1997*		Northeast Louisiana	W 79–52	1–0	Reed Green Coliseum; Hattiesburg, Mississippi
Nov 21, 1997*		at Auburn	L 70–83	1–1	Beard–Eaves–Memorial Coliseum (5,433); Auburn, Alabama
Nov 28, 1997*		Southwestern Louisiana	W 78–65	2–1	Reed Green Coliseum; Hattiesburg, Mississippi
Nov 29, 1997*		Jackson State	W 44–40	3–1	Reed Green Coliseum; Hattiesburg, Mississippi
Dec 5, 1997*		vs. Elon; Arkansas–Little Rock Tournament	W 67–49	4–1	Barton Coliseum; Little Rock, Arkansas
Dec 6, 1997*		at Arkansas–Little Rock; Arkansas–Little Rock Tournament	W 68–57	5–1	Barton Coliseum; Little Rock, Arkansas
Dec 9, 1997*		at South Alabama	W 52–47	6–1	Jaguar Gym; Mobile, Alabama
Dec 21, 1997*		vs. Loyola (IL); San Juan Christmas Classic	W 79–66	7–1	Eugene Guerra Sports Complex; San Juan, Puerto Rico
Dec 22, 1997*		vs. Iowa; San Juan Christmas Classic	L 58–82	7–2	Eugene Guerra Sports Complex; San Juan, Puerto Rico
Dec 23, 1997*		vs. Oral Roberts; San Juan Christmas Classic	W 73–62	8–2	Eugene Guerra Sports Complex; San Juan, Puerto Rico
Dec 27, 1997*		vs. Mississippi Valley State	W 90–57	9–2	Mississippi Coliseum; Jackson, Mississippi
Dec 30, 1997*		Oral Roberts	W 72–50	10–2	Reed Green Coliseum; Hattiesburg, Mississippi
Jan 2, 1998*		Northern Iowa	W 74–49	11–2	Reed Green Coliseum; Hattiesburg, Mississippi
Conference USA regular season
Jan 8, 1998		Houston	W 63–43	12–2 (1–0)	Reed Green Coliseum; Hattiesburg, Mississippi
Jan 10, 1998		South Florida	W 73–61	13–2 (2–0)	Reed Green Coliseum; Hattiesburg, Mississippi
Jan 15, 1998		at Cincinnati	L 61–77	13–3 (2–1)	Myrl H. Shoemaker Center; Cincinnati, Ohio
Jan 17, 1998		UNC Charlotte	L 56–60	13–4 (2–2)	Reed Green Coliseum; Hattiesburg, Mississippi
Jan 20, 1998		at Memphis	L 67–79	13–5 (2–3)	Pyramid Arena; Memphis, Tennessee
Jan 22, 1998		at South Florida	L 61–65	13–6 (2–4)	Sun Dome; Tampa, Florida
Jan 29, 1998		Marquette	L 43–46	13–7 (2–5)	Reed Green Coliseum; Hattiesburg, Mississippi
Jan 31, 1998		at DePaul	W 77–67	14–7 (3–5)	Rosemont Horizon; Rosemont, Illinois
Feb 5, 1998		at Tulane	W 89–86	15–7 (4–5)	Avron B. Fogelman Arena; New Orleans, Louisiana
Feb 7, 1998		at Houston	W 72–67	16–7 (5–5)	Hofheinz Pavilion; Houston, Texas
Feb 12, 1998		UAB	W 73–56	17–7 (6–5)	Reed Green Coliseum (4,041); Hattiesburg, Mississippi
Feb 14, 1998		Memphis	W 75–62	18–7 (7–5)	Reed Green Coliseum; Hattiesburg, Mississippi
Feb 16, 1998		Saint Louis	L 55–58	18–8 (7–6)	Reed Green Coliseum; Hattiesburg, Mississippi
Feb 21, 1998		Tulane	W 88–60	19–8 (8–6)	Reed Green Coliseum; Hattiesburg, Mississippi
Feb 25, 1998		at Louisville	W 72–62	20–8 (9–6)	Freedom Hall; Louisville, Kentucky
Feb 28, 1998		at UAB	L 81–93	20–9 (9–7)	Bartow Arena (6,773); Birmingham, Alabama
C-USA tournament
Mar 4, 1998*	(6)	vs. (11) Houston; First round	W 73–57	21–9	Myrl H. Shoemaker Center; Cincinnati, Ohio
Mar 5, 1998*	(6)	vs. (3) Memphis; Quarterfinals	W 85–57	22–9	Myrl H. Shoemaker Center; Cincinnati, Ohio
Mar 6, 1998*	(6)	vs. (2) UNC Charlotte; Semifinals	L 53–65	22–10	Myrl H. Shoemaker Center; Cincinnati, Ohio
NIT
Mar 11, 1998*		at Auburn; First round	L 62–77	22–11	Beard–Eaves–Memorial Coliseum (5,191); Auburn, Alabama
*Non-conference game. ^{#}Rankings from AP poll. (#) Tournament seedings in parentheses. All times are in Central Time.
