= 1997–98 Saint Louis Billikens men's basketball team =

American college basketball season

1997–98 Saint Louis Billikens men's basketball
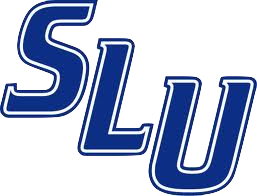

NCAA tournament, second round
- Conference: Conference USA
- American
- Record: 22–11 (11–5 C-USA)
- Head coach: Charlie Spoonhour (6th season)
- Assistant coaches: Greg Lackey; Jay Spoonhour (2nd season); Derek Thomas (3rd season)
- Home arena: Kiel Center

1997–98 Conference USA men's basketball standings
	Conf.				Overall
Team	W		L	PCT	W		L	PCT
American
No. 9 Cincinnati †	14	–	2	.875	27	–	6	.818
UNC Charlotte	13	–	3	.813	20	–	11	.645
Saint Louis	11	–	5	.688	22	–	11	.667
Marquette	8	–	8	.500	20	–	11	.645
Louisville	5	–	11	.313	12	–	20	.375
DePaul	3	–	13	.188	7	–	23	.233
National
Memphis	12	–	4	.750	17	–	12	.586
UAB	10	–	6	.625	21	–	12	.636
Southern Miss	9	–	7	.563	22	–	11	.667
South Florida	7	–	9	.438	17	–	13	.567
Houston	2	–	14	.125	9	–	20	.310
Tulane	2	–	14	.125	7	–	22	.241
† 1998 Conference USA Tournament winner Rankings from AP Poll

The 1997–98 Saint Louis Billikens men's basketball team represented Saint Louis University in the 1997–98 NCAA Division I men's basketball season. The Billikens were led by head coach Charlie Spoonhour who was in his sixth season at Saint Louis. The team played their home games at the Kiel Center and were a member of Conference USA. The Billikens finished the season 22–11, 11–5 in C-USA play to finish 3rd in the American division. They lost in the quarterfinal round of the C-USA tournament, but received an at-large bid to the NCAA tournament as No. 10 seed in the Southeast region. The Billikens eliminated UMass in the opening round before they were defeated by No. 2 seed and eventual National Champion Kentucky in the second round.

Highly touted freshman Larry Hughes set the school's single season scoring record in his only college season. Hughes was named USBWA National Freshman of the Year and was later taken 8th overall by the Philadelphia 76ers in the 1998 NBA draft.

== Roster ==
1997–98 Saint Louis Billikens men's basketball team
Players
Coaches

Pos.	#	Name	Height	Weight	Year	Previous school	Hometown
G/F	10	Troy Robertson	6 ft 4 in (1.93 m)	190 lb (86 kg)	So	St. Charles West	St. Louis, Missouri
G	10	Jamall Walker	6 ft 0 in (1.83 m)	185 lb (84 kg)	Jr	Wichita South	Wichita, Kansas
G	12	John Redden	6 ft 1 in (1.85 m)	190 lb (86 kg)	So	Marquette	St. Louis, Missouri
G	20	Larry Hughes	6 ft 5 in (1.96 m)	180 lb (82 kg)	Fr	Christian Brothers College	St. Louis, Missouri
G/F	22	Virgel Cobbin	6 ft 4 in (1.93 m)	205 lb (93 kg)	Jr	Lamar	Houston, Texas
F	24	Larry Simmons	6 ft 7 in (2.01 m)	190 lb (86 kg)	So	Dulles	Missouri City, Texas
F	30	Matt Baniak	6 ft 9 in (2.06 m)	235 lb (107 kg)	Fr	De Smet Jesuit	St. Louis, Missouri
G	32	Corey Frazier	6 ft 1 in (1.85 m)	192 lb (87 kg)	Sr	Charleston	Charleston, Missouri
F	33	Rasheed Malik	6 ft 6 in (1.98 m)	213 lb (97 kg)	Sr	McLennan	Houston, Texas
C	35	Chris Heinrich	6 ft 11 in (2.11 m)	250 lb (113 kg)	Fr	Church Farm School	Quakertown, Pennsylvania
F	42	Ryan Luechtefeld	6 ft 8 in (2.03 m)	220 lb (100 kg)	Jr	Okawville	Okawville, Illinois

Head coach

- Charlie Spoonhour

Assistant coach(es)

- Greg Lackey
- Jay Spoonhour
- Derek Thomas

Legend

- (C) Team captain
- (S) Suspended
- (I) Ineligible
- (W) Walk-on
- Injured
- Current redshirt

Roster

== Schedule and results ==
Date time, TV	Rank^{#}	Opponent^{#}	Result	Record	Site (attendance) city, state
Regular season
Nov 15, 1997*		Maryland Eastern Shore	W 84–68	1–0	Kiel Center; St. Louis, Missouri
Nov 18, 1997*		East Carolina	W 70–58	2–0	Kiel Center; St. Louis, Missouri
Nov 22, 1997*		San Francisco	W 80–56	3–0	Kiel Center; St. Louis, Missouri
Nov 29, 1997*; 3:30 p.m.		at Southern Illinois	W 85–76	4–0	Banterra Center (4,212); Carbondale, Illinois
Dec 3, 1997*		Vanderbilt	W 78–74	5–0	Kiel Center; St. Louis, Missouri
Dec 6, 1997*		Illinois	W 57–51	6–0	TWA Dome (32,429); St. Louis, Missouri
Dec 13, 1997*		at UMKC	W 68–59	7–0	Municipal Auditorium; Kansas City, Missouri
Dec 17, 1997*		Georgia Southern	W 69–67	8–0	Kiel Center; St. Louis, Missouri
Dec 20, 1997*		at No. 11 UCLA	L 67–73	8–1	Pauley Pavilion (9,998); Los Angeles, California
Dec 24, 1997*		vs. No. 19 Syracuse; Puerto Rico Holiday Classic	L 64–67	8–2	Eugene Guerra Sports Complex; San Juan, Puerto Rico
Dec 25, 1997*; 2:00 pm		vs. Iowa State; Puerto Rico Holiday Classic	L 57–62	8–3	Eugene Guerra Sports Complex (500); San Juan, Puerto Rico
Dec 26, 1997*		vs. No. 12 Arkansas; Puerto Rico Holiday Classic	L 70–78	8–4	Eugene Guerra Sports Complex; San Juan, Puerto Rico
Jan 3, 1998		Memphis	L 62–68	8–5 (0–1)	Kiel Center; St. Louis, Missouri
Jan 7, 1998		at Tulane	W 60–59	9–5 (1–1)	Avron B. Fogelman Arena; New Orleans, Louisiana
Jan 11, 1998		at DePaul	W 64–61	10–5 (2–1)	Rosemont Horizon; Rosemont, Illinois
Jan 15, 1998		Houston	W 67–47	11–5 (3–1)	Kiel Center; St. Louis, Missouri
Jan 17, 1998		UAB	W 77–60	12–5 (4–1)	Kiel Center (18,073); St. Louis, Missouri
Jan 20, 1998		at Louisville	L 81–87	12–6 (4–2)	Freedom Hall; Louisville, Kentucky
Jan 24, 1998		at Marquette	W 71–62	13–6 (5–2)	Bradley Center; Milwaukee, Wisconsin
Jan 26, 1998*		Valparaiso	W 77–66	14–6	Kiel Center (15,977); St. Louis, Missouri
Jan 31, 1998		Louisville	W 64–55	15–6 (6–2)	Kiel Center; St. Louis, Missouri
Feb 4, 1998		UNC Charlotte	W 83–80	16–6 (7–2)	Kiel Center; St. Louis, Missouri
Feb 7, 1998		at South Florida	W 56–45	17–6 (8–2)	Sun Dome; Tampa, Florida
Feb 12, 1998		No. 19 Cincinnati	L 43–70	17–7 (8–3)	Kiel Center; St. Louis, Missouri
Feb 15, 1998		DePaul	W 65–41	18–7 (9–3)	Kiel Center; St. Louis, Missouri
Feb 18, 1998		at Southern Miss	W 58–55	19–7 (10–3)	Reed Green Coliseum; Hattiesburg, Mississippi
Feb 21, 1998		at UNC Charlotte	L 62–76	19–8 (10–4)	Dale F. Halton Arena; Charlotte, North Carolina
Feb 25, 1998		Marquette	W 67–65	20–8 (11–4)	Kiel Center; St. Louis, Missouri
Feb 28, 1998		at No. 17 Cincinnati	L 58–61	20–9 (11–5)	Fifth Third Arena; Cincinnati, Ohio
C-USA tournament
Mar 4, 1998*	(5)	vs. (12) Tulane; First Round	W 71–53	21–9	Fifth Third Arena; Cincinnati, Ohio
Mar 5, 1998*	(5)	vs. (4) UAB; Quarterfinals	L 74–76	21–10	Fifth Third Arena (10,818); Cincinnati, Ohio
NCAA tournament
Mar 13, 1998*	(10 SE)	vs. (7 SE) UMass; First Round	W 51–46	22–10	Georgia Dome (17,474); Atlanta, Georgia
Mar 15, 1998*	(10 SE)	vs. (2 SE) No. 5 Kentucky; Second Round	L 61–88	22–11	Georgia Dome; Atlanta, Georgia
*Non-conference game. ^{#}Rankings from AP Poll. (#) Tournament seedings in parentheses. All times are in Central Time. (#) during NCAA Tournament is seed with Region MW=Midwest.

== Team players drafted into the NBA ==
Round	Pick	Player	NBA club
1	8	Larry Hughes	Philadelphia 76ers
