= 1997–98 Nicholls State Colonels men's basketball team =

American college basketball season

1997–98 Nicholls Colonels men's basketball

Southland tournament champions

NCAA tournament
- Conference: Southland Conference
- Record: 19–10 (15–1 Southland)
- Head coach: Rickey Broussard (8th season)
- Home arena: Stopher Gymnasium

1997–98 Southland Conference men's basketball standings
	Conf.				Overall
Team	W		L	PCT	W		L	PCT
Nicholls State †	15	–	1	.938	19	–	10	.655
Southwest Texas State	10	–	6	.625	17	–	11	.607
UTSA	10	–	6	.625	16	–	11	.593
Northwestern State	10	–	6	.625	13	–	14	.481
Northeast Louisiana	8	–	8	.500	13	–	16	.448
Texas-Arlington	8	–	8	.500	13	–	16	.448
Sam Houston State	7	–	9	.438	9	–	17	.346
Stephen F. Austin	6	–	10	.375	10	–	16	.385
McNeese State	4	–	12	.250	7	–	19	.269
Southeastern Louisiana	2	–	14	.125	6	–	20	.231
† 1998 Southland tournament winner Rankings from AP Poll

The 1997–98 Nicholls State Colonels men's basketball team represented Nicholls State University in the 1997–98 NCAA Division I men's basketball season. The Colonels, led by eighth-year head coach Rickey Broussard, played their home games at Stopher Gymnasium in Thibodaux, Louisiana as members of the Southland Conference. After running off 14 straight wins to begin conference play, the Colonels finished atop the conference regular season standings with a 15–1 record in Southland play. They followed that by winning the Southland tournament to receive an automatic bid to the NCAA tournament. Playing as the No. 16 seed in the West region, Nicholls State lost to No. 1 seed and defending National champion Arizona.

== Roster ==
1997–98 Nicholls Colonels men's basketball team
Players
Coaches

Pos.	#	Name	Height	Weight	Year	Hometown
G	5	Russell McCutcheon	6 ft 5 in (1.96 m)	—	Sr
F		Kenderick Franklin	6 ft 6 in (1.98 m)	—	Sr
F		Jason McCutcheon	6 ft 7 in (2.01 m)	—	Jr

Head coach

- Rickey Broussard

Assistant coach(es)

Legend

- (C) Team captain
- (S) Suspended
- (I) Ineligible
- (W) Walk-on
- Injured
- Current redshirt

Roster

== Schedule and results ==
Date time, TV	Rank^{#}	Opponent^{#}	Result	Record	Site (attendance) city, state
Non-conference regular season
Nov 15, 1997*		at Florida	L 63–66	0–1	Stephen C. O'Connell Center; Gainesville, Florida
Nov 17, 1997*		at Auburn	L 75–96	0–2	Beard–Eaves–Memorial Coliseum (2,250); Auburn, Alabama
Nov 19, 1997*		at Tulane	L 66–67	0–3	Avron B. Fogelman Arena; New Orleans, Louisiana
Nov 29, 1997*		at LSU	L 52–72	0–4	Maravich Assembly Center; Baton Rouge, Louisiana
Dec 10, 1997*		at Rice	W 72–64	1–4	Tudor Fieldhouse; Houston, Texas
Dec 13, 1997*		at Lamar	L 65–73	1–5	Montagne Center; Beaumont, Texas
Dec 20, 1997*		Loyola (New Orleans)	W 86–69	2–5	Stopher Gymnasium; Thibodaux, Louisiana
Dec 22, 1997*		at South Florida	L 78–91	2–6	Sun Dome; Tampa, Florida
Dec 27, 1997*		vs. Wyoming	L 69–84	2–7	Casper Events Center; Casper, Wyoming
Dec 28, 1997*		vs. Austin Peay	L 57–71	2–8	Casper Events Center; Casper, Wyoming
Southland regular season
Jan 3, 1998		at McNeese State	W 79–73	3–8 (1–0)	Burton Coliseum; Lake Charles, Louisiana
Jan 5, 1998		at Sam Houston State	W 68–66	4–8 (2–0)	Bernard Johnson Coliseum; Huntsville, Texas
Jan 10, 1998		Southeastern Louisiana	W 95–81	5–8 (3–0)	Stopher Gymnasium; Thibodaux, Louisiana
Jan 15, 1998		Texas State	W 74–56	6–8 (4–0)	Stopher Gymnasium; Thibodaux, Louisiana
Jan 17, 1998		UTSA	W 82–78	7–8 (5–0)	Stopher Gymnasium; Thibodaux, Louisiana
Jan 22, 1998		at Stephen F. Austin	W 87–66	8–8 (6–0)	William R. Johnson Coliseum; Nacogdoches, Texas
Jan 24, 1998		at Texas–Arlington	W 102–95	9–8 (7–0)	Texas Hall; Arlington, Texas
Jan 29, 1998		Louisiana–Monroe	W 90–77	10–8 (8–0)	Stopher Gymnasium; Thibodaux, Louisiana
Jan 31, 1998		Northwestern State	W 71–62	11–8 (9–0)	Stopher Gymnasium; Thibodaux, Louisiana
Feb 5, 1998		at Texas State	W 85–81	12–8 (10–0)	Strahan Arena; San Marcos, Texas
Feb 14, 1998		at Southeastern Louisiana	W 88–71	13–8 (11–0)	University Center; Hammond, Louisiana
Feb 16, 1998		Stephen F. Austin	W 79–76	14–8 (12–0)	Stopher Gymnasium; Thibodaux, Louisiana
Feb 19, 1998		McNeese State	W 87–80	15–8 (13–0)	Stopher Gymnasium; Thibodaux, Louisiana
Feb 21, 1998		Sam Houston State	W 77–74	16–8 (14–0)	Stopher Gymnasium; Thibodaux, Louisiana
Feb 26, 1998		at Louisiana–Monroe	L 74–80	16–9 (14–1)	Fant–Ewing Coliseum; Monroe, Louisiana
Feb 28, 1998		at Northwestern State	W 84–74	17–9 (15–1)	Prather Coliseum; Natchitoches, Louisiana
Southland Tournament
Mar 6, 1998*		vs. Texas State; Semifinals	W 79–71	18–9	Hirsch Memorial Coliseum; Shreveport, Louisiana
Mar 7, 1998*		vs. Texas–Arlington; Championship game	W 84–81	19–9	Hirsch Memorial Coliseum; Shreveport, Louisiana
NCAA Tournament
Mar 12, 1998*	(16 W)	vs. (1 W) No. 4 Arizona; First round	L 60–99	19–10	ARCO Arena; Sacramento, California
*Non-conference game. ^{#}Rankings from AP Poll. (#) Tournament seedings in parentheses. All times are in Central.
