= 1997–98 UC Irvine Anteaters men's basketball team =

American college basketball season

1997–98 UC Irvine Anteaters men's basketball
- Conference: Big West Conference
- Record: 9–18 (6–10 Big West)
- Head coach: Pat Douglass (1st season)
- Assistant coach: Cameron Dollar (1st season)
- Home arena: Bren Events Center

1997–98 Big West men's basketball standings
	Conf.				Overall
Team	W		L	PCT	W		L	PCT
East Division
Utah State†	13	–	3	.813	25	–	8	.758
Nevada	11	–	5	.688	16	–	12	.571
Boise State	9	–	7	.563	17	–	13	.567
Idaho	9	–	7	.563	15	–	12	.556
New Mexico State	8	–	8	.500	18	–	12	.600
North Texas	4	–	12	.250	5	–	21	.192
West Division
Pacific	14	–	2	.875	23	–	10	.697
Cal Poly	7	–	9	.438	14	–	14	.500
Cal State Fullerton	6	–	10	.375	12	–	16	.429
UC Irvine	6	–	10	.375	9	–	18	.333
Long Beach State	5	–	11	.313	10	–	19	.345
UC Santa Barbara	4	–	12	.250	7	–	19	.269
† 1998 Big West tournament winner As of April 10, 1998; Rankings from AP poll

The 1997–98 UC Irvine Anteaters men's basketball team represented the University of California, Irvine during the 1997–98 NCAA Division I men's basketball season. The Anteaters were led by 1st year head coach Pat Douglass and played at the Bren Events Center and were members of the Big West Conference.

== Previous season ==
The 1996–97 UC Irvine Anteaters men's basketball team finished the season with a record of 1–25 and 1–15 in Big West play, the worst record in program history. At the end of the season, head coach Rod Baker did not have his contract renewed. On March 27, 1997, Cal State Bakersfield head coach Pat Douglass was announced as the seventh head coach in program history.

== Roster ==
1997–98 UC Irvine Anteaters men's basketball team
Players
Coaches

Pos.	#	Name	Height	Weight	Year	Hometown
G	53	Junior Bond	6 ft 8 in (2.03 m)	235 lb (107 kg)	Jr	Tracy, CA
C		Andrew Carlson	6 ft 10 in (2.08 m)	—	So
G		Tony Dela Cruz	6 ft 5 in (1.96 m)	209 lb (95 kg)	So
G	11	Malachi Edmond	6 ft 1 in (1.85 m)	185 lb (84 kg)	Fr
G		JaSon Flowers	6 ft 1 in (1.85 m)	—	Fr
G		Juma Jackson	6 ft 5 in (1.96 m)	—	So
F		Ben Jones	6 ft 7 in (2.01 m)	—	Fr
G	4	Andrew Navar	6 ft 3 in (1.91 m)	—	Jr
G		Lamarr Parker	6 ft 1 in (1.85 m)	—	Jr
C		Wendell Robinson	6 ft 8 in (2.03 m)	—	Sr
G		Puneet Sahi	5 ft 11 in (1.8 m)	—	Jr
G		Brian Scoggin	6 ft 2 in (1.88 m)	—	Jr
F	42	Adam Stetson	6 ft 7 in (2.01 m)	230 lb (104 kg)	So
F		Matt Willard	6 ft 9 in (2.06 m)	—	Jr
G		Lamarr Parker	6 ft 1 in (1.85 m)	—	Jr

Head coach

- Pat Douglass (Pacific)

Assistant coach(es)

- Cameron Dollar (UCLA)

Legend

- (C) Team captain
- (S) Suspended
- (I) Ineligible
- (W) Walk-on
- Injured
- Current redshirt

Roster

== Schedule ==
Date time, TV	Rank^{#}	Opponent^{#}	Result	Record	Site (attendance) city, state
Non-Conference Season
November 15, 1997*		San Francisco	L 59–75	0–1	Bren Events Center (1,813); Irvine, CA
November 18, 1997*		Pepperdine	L 46–50	0–2	Bren Events Center (2,268); Irvine, CA
November 21, 1997*		Chico State	W 74–66	1–2	Bren Events Center (1,110); Irvine, CA
November 29, 1997*		at No. 16 Utah	L 45–83	1–3	Jon M. Huntsman Center (12,921); Salt Lake City, UT
December 4, 1997*		Oregon State	L 43–65	1–4	Bren Events Center (1,182); Irvine, CA
December 13, 1997*		San Diego State	L 66–69	1–5	Bren Events Center (1,043); Irvine, CA
December 18, 1997*		Portland	W 67–61	2–5	Bren Events Center (708); Irvine, CA
December 21, 1997*		at Northern Arizona	L 56–88	2–6	Walkup Skydome (1,005); Flagstaff, AZ
December 23, 1997*		at UNLV	L 55–77	2–7	Thomas & Mack Center (12,913); Paradise, NV
January 3, 1998*		Sonoma State	W 51–41	3–7	Bren Events Center (724); Irvine, CA
Conference Season
January 8, 1998		at North Texas	L 78–89	3–8 (0–1)	Super Pit (1,308); Denton, TX
January 10, 1998		at New Mexico State	W 62–55	4–8 (1–1)	Pan American Center (8,738); Las Cruces, NM
January 15, 1998		Boise State	W 65–63	5–8 (2–1)	Bren Events Center (1,514); Irvine, CA
January 17, 1998		Idaho	W 62–50	6–8 (3–1)	Bren Events Center (1,785); Irvine, CA
January 22, 1998		at Pacific	L 63–72	6–9 (3–2)	Alex G. Spanos Center (4,576); Stockton, CA
January 24, 1998		at Long Beach State	L 63–71	6–10 (3–3)	The Pyramid (3,093); Long Beach, CA
January 29, 1998		Cal Poly	W 94–90	7–10 (4–3)	Bren Events Center (2,050); Irvine, CA
January 31, 1998		UC Santa Barbara	L 66–74	7–11 (4–4)	Bren Events Center (2,180); Irvine, CA
February 5, 1998		Cal State Fullerton	L 48–51	7–12 (4–5)	Bren Events Center (1,770); Irvine, CA
February 7, 1998		at Nevada	L 75–86	7–13 (4–6)	Lawlor Events Center (5,231); Reno, NV
February 12, 1998		Utah State	L 51–60	7–14 (4–7)	Bren Events Center (1,679); Irvine, CA
February 14, 1998		at Cal State Fullerton	L 66–85	7–15 (4–8)	Titan Gym (980); Fullerton, CA
February 19, 1998		Long Beach State	W 65–59	8–15 (5–8)	Bren Events Center (2,186); Irvine, CA
February 21, 1998		Pacific	L 43–66	8–16 (5–9)	Bren Events Center (2,557); Irvine, CA
February 26, 1998		at UC Santa Barbara	W 69–58	9–16 (6–9)	UC Santa Barbara Events Center (1,130); Santa Barbara, CA
February 28, 1998		at Cal Poly	L 82–92	9–17 (6–10)	Mott Gym (2,740); San Luis Obispo, CA
Big West Conference tournament
March 6, 1998		at Nevada; Quarterfinals	L 72–81	9–18	Lawlor Events Center (5,942); Reno, NV
*Non-conference game. ^{#}Rankings from AP Poll. (#) Tournament seedings in parentheses. All times are in Pacific Time.

== Awards and honors ==
- Ben Jones
  - Big West All-Freshman Team
