= 1998 National Invitation Tournament =

Annual NCAA basketball competition

- Season: 1997–98
- Teams: 32
- Finals site: Madison Square Garden, New York City
- Champions: Minnesota Golden Gophers (Vacated) (2nd title)
- Runner-up: Penn State Nittany Lions (1st title game)
- Semifinalists: Georgia Bulldogs (2nd semifinal); Fresno State Bulldogs (2nd semifinal)
- Winning coach: Clem Haskins (2nd title)
- MVP: Kevin Clark (Vacated) (Minnesota)

The 1998 National Invitation Tournament was the 1997 edition of the annual NCAA college basketball competition. Minnesota's tournament victory was vacated as a result of numerous NCAA violations, including academic fraud, that took place under coach Clem Haskins. Kevin Clark also vacated his tournament Most Valuable Player award.

== Selected teams ==
Below is a list of the 32 teams selected for the tournament.

School	Conference	Record	Appearance	Last bid
Arizona State	Pac-10	18–13	6th	1994
Auburn	SEC	15–13	4th	1996
Ball State	MAC	21–7	3rd	1992
Colorado State	WAC	20–8	5th	1996
Creighton	Missouri Valley	18–9	6th	1990
Dayton	Atlantic 10	20–11	18th	1986
Florida	SEC	14–14	7th	1993
Fresno State	WAC	18–11	6th	1997
Georgetown	Big East	15–14	6th	1993
Georgia	SEC	16–14	8th	1995
Georgia Tech	ACC	17–13	5th	1994
Gonzaga	West Coast	23–9	3rd	1996
Hawaii	WAC	19–8	6th	1997
Iowa	Big Ten	20–10	2nd	1995
Kansas State	Big 12	17–11	4th	1994
LIU Brooklyn	NEC	21–10	10th	1982
Marquette	C-USA	18–10	12th	1995
Memphis	C-USA	16–11	13th	1997
Minnesota	Big Ten	15–15	8th	1996
Missouri	Big 12	17–14	5th	1996
NC State	ACC	16–14	7th	1997
Pacific	Big West	23–9	1st	Never
Penn State	Big Ten	15–12	7th	1995
Rider	MAAC	18–9	1st	Never
Seton Hall	Big East	15–14	12th	1995
Southern Miss	C-USA	22–10	7th	1995
St. Bonaventure	Atlantic 10	17–14	13th	1995
UAB	C-USA	20–11	7th	1997
UNC Wilmington	Colonial	20–10	1st	Never
Vanderbilt	SEC	18–12	7th	1996
Wake Forest	ACC	15–13	3rd	1985
Wyoming	WAC	19–8	5th	1991

== Bracket ==
Below are the four first round brackets, along with the four-team championship bracket.

First Round
Wake Forest	56
UNC Wilmington	52
Vanderbilt	73
St. Bonaventure	61
Georgia	100
Iowa	93
NC State	59
Kansas State	39

Second Round
Wake Forest	68
Vanderbilt	72
Georgia	61
NC State	55

Quarterfinals
Vanderbilt	65
Georgia	79

First Round
Penn State	82
Rider	68
Dayton	95
LIU	92
Georgetown	71
Florida	69
Georgia Tech	88
Seton Hall	70

Second Round
Penn State	77
Dayton	74
Georgetown	79
Georgia Tech	80

Quarterfinals
Penn State	77
Georgia Tech	70

First Round
Hawaii	90
Arizona State	73
Gonzaga	69
Wyoming	55
Fresno State	73
Pacific	70
Memphis	90
Ball State	67

Second Round
Hawaii	78
Gonzaga	70
Fresno State	83
Memphis	80

Quarterfinals
Hawaii	83
Fresno State	85

First Round
Marquette	80
Creighton	68
Auburn	77
Southern Miss	62
~~Minnesota~~	77
Colorado State	65
UAB	93
Missouri	86

Second Round
Marquette	75
Auburn	60
~~Minnesota~~	79
UAB	66

Quarterfinals
Marquette	71
~~Minnesota~~	73

=== Semifinals & finals ===
Semifinals
Georgia	60
Penn State	66
Fresno State	89
~~Minnesota~~	91

Finals
Penn State	72
~~Minnesota~~	79

Third place game
Georgia	95
Fresno State	79

Minnesota later forfeited its entire 1997–98 schedule due to an academic fraud scandal.

== See also ==
- 1998 Women's National Invitation Tournament
- 1998 NCAA Division I men's basketball tournament
- 1998 NCAA Division II men's basketball tournament
- 1998 NCAA Division III men's basketball tournament
- 1998 NCAA Division I women's basketball tournament
- 1998 NAIA Division I men's basketball tournament
- 1998 NAIA Division II men's basketball tournament
