= 1997–98 UAB Blazers men's basketball team =

American college basketball season

1997–98 UAB Blazers men's basketball

Orange Bowl Classic Champion

NIT, 2nd round
- Conference: Conference USA
- National
- Record: 21–12 (10–6 C-USA)
- Head coach: Murry Bartow (2nd season)
- Assistant coach: Andy Kennedy (2nd season)
- Home arena: Bartow Arena

1997–98 Conference USA men's basketball standings
	Conf.				Overall
Team	W		L	PCT	W		L	PCT
American
No. 9 Cincinnati †	14	–	2	.875	27	–	6	.818
UNC Charlotte	13	–	3	.813	20	–	11	.645
Saint Louis	11	–	5	.688	22	–	11	.667
Marquette	8	–	8	.500	20	–	11	.645
Louisville	5	–	11	.313	12	–	20	.375
DePaul	3	–	13	.188	7	–	23	.233
National
Memphis	12	–	4	.750	17	–	12	.586
UAB	10	–	6	.625	21	–	12	.636
Southern Miss	9	–	7	.563	22	–	11	.667
South Florida	7	–	9	.438	17	–	13	.567
Houston	2	–	14	.125	9	–	20	.310
Tulane	2	–	14	.125	7	–	22	.241
† 1998 Conference USA Tournament winner Rankings from AP Poll

The 1997–98 UAB Blazers men's basketball team represented the University of Alabama at Birmingham as a member of Conference USA during the 1997–98 NCAA Division I men's basketball season. The Blazers were coached by Murry Bartow and played their home games at Bartow Arena.

On December 27, 1997, UAB defeated Florida 80–73 in the Orange Bowl Basketball Classic held at Miami Arena.

The Blazers finished the season with a 21–12 record. In the 1998, CUSA tournament they lost in the 2nd round to Cincinnati 100-85. In the 1998 NIT, they lost in the 2nd round to Minnesota 79–66.

== Roster ==
1997–98 UAB Blazers men's basketball team
Players
Coaches

Pos.	#	Name	Height	Weight	Year	Previous school	Hometown
F	15	Bill Armstrong	6 ft 1 in (1.85 m)	185 lb (84 kg)	Fr	Oneonta HS	Oneonta, Alabama
F	22	Fred Williams	6 ft 8 in (2.03 m)	220 lb (100 kg)	Jr		Queens, New York

Head coach

- Murry Bartow

Assistant coach(es)

- Andy Kennedy (UAB)

Legend

- (C) Team captain
- (S) Suspended
- (I) Ineligible
- (W) Walk-on
- Injured
- Current redshirt

Roster

== Schedule and results ==
Date time, TV	Rank^{#}	Opponent^{#}	Result	Record	Site (attendance) city, state
Regular season
Nov 14, 1997*		Arkansas–Pine Bluff	W 81–51	1–0	Bartow Arena (5,143); Birmingham, Alabama
Nov 17, 1997*		at Cleveland State	W 74–58	2–0	CSU Convocation Center (5,321); Cleveland, Ohio
Nov 20, 1997*		No. 23 Indiana	L 64–80	2–1	BJCC Coliseum (16,982); Birmingham, Alabama
Nov 26, 1997*		vs. No. 6 Purdue; Great Alaska Shootout	L 64–92	2–2	Sullivan Arena (8,700); Anchorage, Alaska
Nov 28, 1997*		vs. Southwestern Louisiana; Great Alaska Shootout	W 75–67	3–2	Sullivan Arena (8,700); Anchorage, Alaska
Nov 29, 1997*		vs. No. 7 UCLA; Great Alaska Shootout Fifth Place Game	L 72–86	3–3	Sullivan Arena (8,700); Anchorage, Alaska
Dec 4, 1997*		North Texas	W 79–73	4–3	Bartow Arena (3,927); Birmingham, Alabama
Dec 9, 1997*		Vanderbilt	L 74–85	4–4	Bartow Arena (5,556); Birmingham, Alabama
Dec 16, 1997*		at Chattanooga	W 57–55	5–4	UTC Arena (6,092); Chattanooga, Tennessee
Dec 20, 1997*		Auburn; Holiday Hardwood Classic	W 71–65	5–4	BJCC Coliseum (12,684); Birmingham, Alabama
Dec 27, 1997*		vs. Florida; Orange Bowl Basketball Classic	W 80–73	6–4	Miami Arena (8,561); Miami, Florida
Dec 30, 1997*		Jackson State	W 74–61	7–4	Bartow Arena (4,318); Birmingham, Alabama
Jan 3, 1998		at South Florida	W 62–48	8–4 (1–0)	Sun Dome (4,318); Tampa, Florida
Jan 7, 1998		at No. 20 Marquette	W 65–52	9–4 (2–0)	Bradley Center (10,938); Milwaukee, Wisconsin
Jan 10, 1998		Tulane	W 85–66	10–4 (3–0)	Bartow Arena (8,550); Birmingham, Alabama
Jan 15, 1998		Louisville	W 55–53	11–4 (4–0)	Bartow Arena (8,227); Birmingham, Alabama
Jan 17, 1998		at Saint Louis	L 60–77	11–5 (4–1)	Kiel Center (18,073); St. Louis, Missouri
Jan 22, 1998		at Memphis	L 70–86	11–6 (4–2)	Pyramid Arena (12,501); Memphis, Tennessee
Jan 24, 1998		at UNC Charlotte	L 80–86	11–7 (4–3)	Dale F. Halton Arena (5,687); Charlotte, North Carolina
Jan 31, 1998		Houston	W 78–61	12–7 (5–3)	Bartow Arena (5,570); Birmingham, Alabama
Feb 2, 1998		DePaul	L 53–54	12–8 (5–4)	Bartow Arena (4,137); Birmingham, Alabama
Feb 8, 1998		Memphis	W 88–77	13–8 (6–4)	Bartow Arena (4,788); Birmingham, Alabama
Feb 12, 1998		at Southern Miss	L 56–73	13–9 (6–5)	Reed Green Coliseum (4,041); Hattiesburg, Mississippi
Feb 14, 1998		at Tulane	W 77–69	14–9 (7–5)	Avron B. Fogelman Arena (1,456); New Orleans, Louisiana
Feb 19, 1998		No. 17 Cincinnati	L 76–93	14–10 (7–6)	Bartow Arena (7,185); Birmingham, Alabama
Feb 21, 1998		at Houston	W 104–70	15–10 (8–6)	Hofheinz Pavilion (2,485); Houston, Texas
Feb 23, 1998*		Norfolk State	W 103–74	16–10	Bartow Arena (3,612); Birmingham, Alabama
Feb 26, 1998		South Florida	W 92–76	17–10 (9–6)	Bartow Arena (4,212); Birmingham, Alabama
Feb 28, 1998		Southern Miss	W 93–81	18–10 (10–6)	Bartow Arena (6,773); Birmingham, Alabama
Conference USA tournament
Mar 5, 1998*	(4)	vs. (5) Saint Louis; Quarterfinals	W 76–74	19–10	Myrl Shoemaker Center (10,818); Cincinnati, Ohio
Mar 6, 1998*	(4)	at (1) No. 14 Cincinnati; Semifinals	L 85–100	19–11	Myrl Shoemaker Center (13,000); Cincinnati, Ohio
NIT tournament
Mar 11, 1998*		at Missouri; First round	W 93–86	20–11	Hearnes Center (4,783); Columbia, Missouri
Mar 16, 1998*		at Minnesota; Second round	L 66–79	20–12	Williams Arena (14,045); Minneapolis, Minnesota
*Non-conference game. ^{#}Rankings from AP poll. (#) Tournament seedings in parentheses. All times are in Central Time.
