= 1998 Southland Conference men's basketball tournament =

Basketball Tournament March 1998 in Louisiana

- Classification: Division I
- Season: 1997–98
- Teams: 6
- Site: Hirsch Memorial Coliseum; Shreveport, Louisiana
- Champions: Nicholls State Colonels (2nd title)
- Winning coach: Rickey Broussard (2nd title)

1997–98 Southland Conference men's basketball standings
	Conf.				Overall
Team	W		L	PCT	W		L	PCT
Nicholls State †	15	–	1	.938	19	–	10	.655
Texas State	10	–	6	.625	17	–	11	.607
UTSA	10	–	6	.625	16	–	11	.593
Northwestern State	10	–	6	.625	13	–	14	.481
Northeast Louisiana	8	–	8	.500	13	–	16	.448
Texas-Arlington	8	–	8	.500	13	–	16	.448
Sam Houston State	7	–	9	.438	9	–	17	.346
Stephen F. Austin	6	–	10	.375	10	–	16	.385
McNeese State	4	–	12	.250	7	–	19	.269
Southeastern Louisiana	2	–	14	.125	6	–	20	.231
† 1998 Southland tournament winner Rankings from AP Poll

The 1998 Southland Conference men's basketball tournament was held March 5–7 at Hirsch Memorial Coliseum in Shreveport, Louisiana.

Nicholls State defeated Texas–Arlington in the championship game, 84–81, to win their second Southland men's basketball tournament.

The Colonels received a bid to the 1998 NCAA Tournament as the No. 16 seed in the West region.

== Format ==
Six of the ten conference members participated in the tournament field. They were seeded based on regular season conference records, with the top two seeds receiving a bye to the semifinal round. Tournament play began with the quarterfinal round.

== Bracket ==
Quarterfinals; March 5
4	Southwest Texas State	90
5	Northeast Louisiana	87
3	UTSA	62
6	Texas–Arlington	66

Semifinals; March 6
1	Nicholls State	79
4	Southwest Texas State	71
6	Texas–Arlington	77
2	Northwestern State	72

Championship; March 7
1	Nicholls State	84
6	Texas–Arlington	81
