= 1997–98 Idaho Vandals men's basketball team =

Season of the Idaho Vandals men's basketball team

1997–98 Idaho Vandals men's basketball
- Conference: Big West Conference
- Record: 15–12 (9–7 Big West)
- Head coach: David Farrar (1st season)
- Home arena: Kibbie Dome

1997–98 Big West men's basketball standings
	Conf.				Overall
Team	W		L	PCT	W		L	PCT
East Division
Utah State†	13	–	3	.813	25	–	8	.758
Nevada	11	–	5	.688	16	–	12	.571
Boise State	9	–	7	.563	17	–	13	.567
Idaho	9	–	7	.563	15	–	12	.556
New Mexico State	8	–	8	.500	18	–	12	.600
North Texas	4	–	12	.250	5	–	21	.192
West Division
Pacific	14	–	2	.875	23	–	10	.697
Cal Poly	7	–	9	.438	14	–	14	.500
Cal State Fullerton	6	–	10	.375	12	–	16	.429
UC Irvine	6	–	10	.375	9	–	18	.333
Long Beach State	5	–	11	.313	10	–	19	.345
UC Santa Barbara	4	–	12	.250	7	–	19	.269
† 1998 Big West tournament winner As of April 10, 1998; Rankings from AP poll

The 1997–98 Idaho Vandals men's basketball team represented the University of Idaho during the 1997–98 NCAA Division I men's basketball season. Members of the Big West Conference, the Vandals were led by first-year head coach David Farrar and played their home games on campus at the Kibbie Dome in Moscow, Idaho.

The Vandals were 15–11 overall in the regular season and 9–7 in conference play, tied for third in the East division standings. They met West division champion Pacific in the first round of the conference tournament and lost by eight points.

== Postseason result ==
Date time, TV	Rank^{#}	Opponent^{#}	Result	Record	Site (attendance) city, state
Big West tournament
Fri, March 6; 6:00 pm	(E4)	vs. (W1) Pacific; Quarterfinal	L 74–82	15–12	Lawlor Events Center; Reno, Nevada
*Non-conference game. (#) Tournament seedings in parentheses. All times are in Pacific time.
