= 1997–98 UNC Charlotte 49ers men's basketball team =

American college basketball season

1997–98 UNC Charlotte 49ers men's basketball
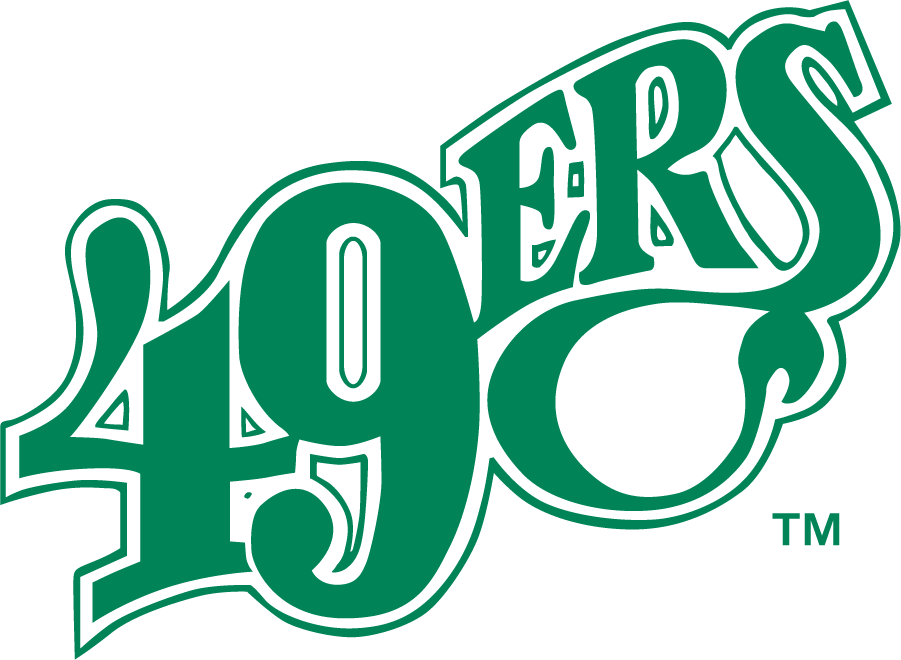

NCAA tournament, Second round
- Conference: Conference USA
- American
- Record: 20–11 (13–3 C-USA)
- Head coach: Melvin Watkins (2nd season)
- Home arena: Dale F. Halton Arena

1997–98 Conference USA men's basketball standings
	Conf.				Overall
Team	W		L	PCT	W		L	PCT
American
No. 9 Cincinnati †	14	–	2	.875	27	–	6	.818
UNC Charlotte	13	–	3	.813	20	–	11	.645
Saint Louis	11	–	5	.688	22	–	11	.667
Marquette	8	–	8	.500	20	–	11	.645
Louisville	5	–	11	.313	12	–	20	.375
DePaul	3	–	13	.188	7	–	23	.233
National
Memphis	12	–	4	.750	17	–	12	.586
UAB	10	–	6	.625	21	–	12	.636
Southern Miss	9	–	7	.563	22	–	11	.667
South Florida	7	–	9	.438	17	–	13	.567
Houston	2	–	14	.125	9	–	20	.310
Tulane	2	–	14	.125	7	–	22	.241
† 1998 Conference USA Tournament winner Rankings from AP Poll

The 1997–98 UNC Charlotte 49ers men's basketball team represented the University of North Carolina at Charlotte in the 1997–98 college basketball season. This was head coach Melvin Watkins's second of two seasons at the helm of his alma mater. The 49ers competed in Conference USA and played their home games at Dale F. Halton Arena. They finished the season 20–11 (13–3 in C-USA play) and received an at-large bid to the 1998 NCAA tournament as No. 8 seed in the East region. The 49ers defeated Illinois-Chicago in the opening round before losing to No. 1 seed North Carolina, 93–83 in overtime, in the round of 32.

== Roster ==
1997–98 Charlotte 49ers men's basketball team
Players
Coaches

Pos.	#	Name	Height	Weight	Year	Hometown
F/C	4	DeMarco Johnson	6 ft 9 in (2.06 m)	240 lb (109 kg)	Sr	Charlotte, North Carolina
G	5	Sean Colson	6 ft 3 in (1.91 m)	170 lb (77 kg)	Sr	Philadelphia, Pennsylvania
F		Galen Young	6 ft 7 in (2.01 m)	215 lb (98 kg)	Jr	Memphis, Tennessee

Head coach

- Melvin Watkins

Assistant coach(es)

Legend

- (C) Team captain
- (S) Suspended
- (I) Ineligible
- (W) Walk-on
- Injured
- Current redshirt

Roster

== Schedule and results ==
Date time, TV	Rank^{#}	Opponent^{#}	Result	Record	Site city, state
Regular season
Nov 21, 1997*	No. 17	at Miami (FL)	L 72–89	0–1	Miami Arena; Miami, Florida
Nov 24, 1997*	No. 25	at Appalachian State	L 60–66	0–2	Varsity Gymnasium; Boone, North Carolina
Dec 3, 1997*		Old Dominion	W 72–44	1–2	Dale F. Halton Arena; Charlotte, North Carolina
Dec 6, 1997*		at VMI	W 88–70	2–2	Cameron Hall; Lexington, Virginia
Dec 10, 1997*		Davidson	W 70–55	3–2	Dale F. Halton Arena; Charlotte, North Carolina
Dec 12, 1997*		Boston University	L 71–73	3–3	Dale F. Halton Arena; Charlotte, North Carolina
Dec 20, 1997*		at George Washington	L 83–93	3–4	MCI Center; Washington, D.C.
Dec 27, 1997*; 9:00 pm		vs. Western Michigan; Hoosier Classic	L 65–81	3–5	Market Square Arena (15,918); Indianapolis, Indiana
Dec 28, 1997*		vs. Southwest Missouri State; Hoosier Classic	W 83–69	4–5	Market Square Arena; Indianapolis, Indiana
Jan 3, 1998		DePaul	W 81–55	5–5 (1–0)	Dale F. Halton Arena; Charlotte, North Carolina
Jan 8, 1998		at South Florida	W 74–64	6–5 (2–0)	Sun Dome; Tampa, Florida
Jan 13, 1998		No. 23 Marquette	W 66–53	7–5 (3–0)	Dale F. Halton Arena; Charlotte, North Carolina
Jan 15, 1998*		vs. Massachusetts; A-10/Conference USA Challenge	L 62–68 ^{OT}	7–6	Providence Civic Center (3,925); Providence, Rhode Island
Jan 17, 1998		at Southern Miss	W 60–56	8–6 (4–0)	Reed Green Coliseum; Hattiesburg, Mississippi
Jan 22, 1998		Louisville	W 84–75	9–6 (5–0)	Dale F. Halton Arena; Charlotte, North Carolina
Jan 24, 1998		UAB	W 86–80	10–6 (6–0)	Dale F. Halton Arena (5,687); Charlotte, North Carolina
Jan 29, 1998		at DePaul	W 86–73	11–6 (7–0)	Rosemont Horizon; Rosemont, Illinois
Jan 31, 1998		at Memphis	L 70–73	11–7 (7–1)	Pyramid Arena; Memphis, Tennessee
Feb 4, 1998		at Saint Louis	L 80–83	11–8 (7–2)	Kiel Center; St. Louis, Missouri
Feb 7, 1998		No. 20 Cincinnati	W 69–62	12–8 (8–2)	Dale F. Halton Arena; Charlotte, North Carolina
Feb 9, 1998		Tulane	W 77–68	13–8 (9–2)	Dale F. Halton Arena; Charlotte, North Carolina
Feb 12, 1998		at Marquette	W 58–56	14–8 (10–2)	Bradley Center; Milwaukee, Wisconsin
Feb 15, 1998		at Louisville	W 73–68	15–8 (11–2)	Freedom Hall; Louisville, Kentucky
Feb 21, 1998		Saint Louis	W 76–62	16–8 (12–2)	Dale F. Halton Arena; Charlotte, North Carolina
Feb 26, 1998		at No. 17 Cincinnati	L 67–68	16–9 (12–3)	Myrl H. Shoemaker Center; Cincinnati, Ohio
Feb 28, 1998		Houston	W 105–75	17–9 (13–3)	Dale F. Halton Arena; Charlotte, North Carolina
C-USA tournament
Mar 5, 1998*		vs. Marquette; Quarterfinals	W 63–55	18–9	Myrl H. Shoemaker Center; Cincinnati, Ohio
Mar 6, 1998*		vs. Southern Miss; Semifinals	W 65–53	19–9	Myrl H. Shoemaker Center; Cincinnati, Ohio
Mar 7, 1998*		at No. 14 Cincinnati; Championship game	L 57–71	19–10	Myrl H. Shoemaker Center; Cincinnati, Ohio
NCAA tournament
Mar 12, 1998*	(8 E)	vs. (9 E) Illinois-Chicago; First Round	W 77–62	20–10	Hartford Civic Center; Hartford, Connecticut
Mar 14, 1998*	(8 E)	vs. (1 E) No. 1 North Carolina; Second Round	L 83–93 ^{OT}	20–11	Hartford Civic Center; Hartford, Connecticut
*Non-conference game. ^{#}Rankings from AP poll. (#) Tournament seedings in parentheses. W=West. All times are in Eastern Time.
