= Joel Sobotka =

American basketball player-coach (born 1970)

Joel Sobotka (born August 20, 1970) is the former head men's basketball coach for Portland State University and was most recently the head coach of Valley Catholic High School in Beaverton, Oregon. He also was a former assistant coach at Cal State Northridge and the University of Portland. Prior to Cal State Northridge, he was an assistant coach under Ritchie McKay, and then head coach for four seasons at Portland State University.

== Head coaching record ==
Statistics overview
Season	Team	Overall		
Portland State (Big Sky Conference) (1998–2002)
1998–99	Portland State	17–11	9–7	3rd
1999–2000	Portland State	15–14	7–9	6th
2000–01	Portland State	9–18	6–10	7th
2001–02	Portland State	12–16	6–8	6th
Portland State:		53–59 (.473)	28–34 (.452)	
Total:		53–59 (.473)		
National champion Postseason invitational champion Conference regular season champion Conference regular season and conference tournament champion Division regular season champion Division regular season and conference tournament champion Conference tournament champion
