= 1997–98 Big East Conference men's basketball season =

American college basketball season

1997–98 Big East Conference Men's Basketball Season
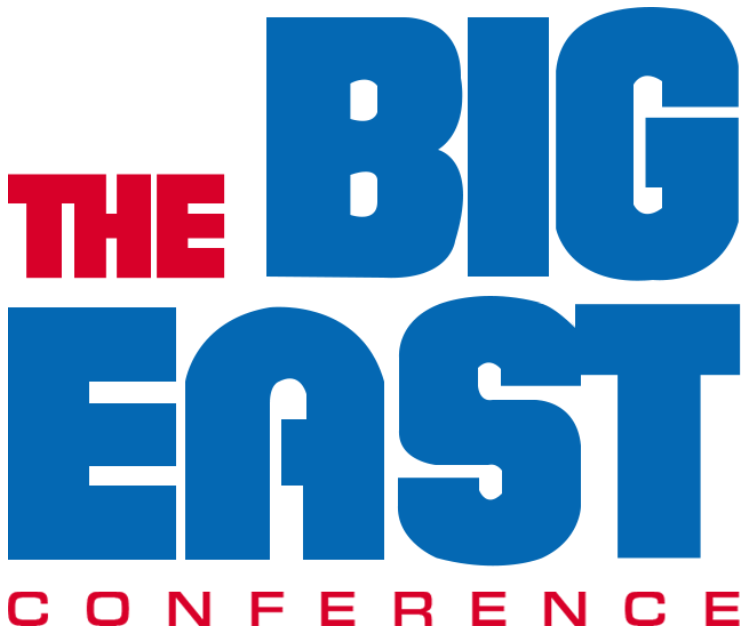
- League: NCAA Division I
- Sport: Basketball
- Duration: November 14, 1997 through March 7, 1998
- Teams: 13
- TV partner: ESPN

Regular Season
- Champion: Connecticut (Big East 6, 15–3); Syracuse (Big East 7, 12–6)
- Season MVP: Richard Hamilton – Connecticut

Tournament
- Champions: Connecticut
- Finals MVP: Khalid El-Amin – Connecticut

Basketball seasons
- 1996–97 1998–99

1997–98 Big East men's basketball standings
	Conf.				Overall
Team	W		L	PCT	W		L	PCT
Big East 6
No. 6 Connecticut†	15	–	3	.833	32	–	5	.865
St. John's	13	–	5	.722	22	–	10	.688
West Virginia	11	–	7	.611	24	–	9	.727
Villanova	8	–	10	.444	12	–	17	.414
Notre Dame	7	–	11	.389	13	–	14	.481
Boston College	6	–	12	.333	15	–	16	.484
Big East 7
No. 21 Syracuse	12	–	6	.667	26	–	9	.743
Miami	11	–	7	.611	18	–	10	.643
Seton Hall	9	–	9	.500	15	–	15	.500
Providence	7	–	11	.389	13	–	16	.448
Pittsburgh	6	–	12	.333	11	–	16	.407
Rutgers	6	–	12	.333	14	–	15	.483
Georgetown	6	–	12	.333	16	–	15	.516
† 1998 Big East tournament winner As of March 30, 1998; Rankings from AP poll

The 1997–98 Big East Conference men's basketball season was the 19th in conference history, and involved its 13 full-time member schools.

Connecticut was the regular-season champion of the Big East 6 Division with a record of 15–3, and Syracuse won the regular-season Big East 7 Division championship with a record of 12–6. Connecticut won the Big East tournament championship.

== Season summary & highlights ==
- For the last time, the Big East used the divisional structure which had debuted in the 1995–96 season, with six of its teams playing in the Big East 6 Division and seven in the Big East 7 Division. The conference returned to a unitary structure the following season.
- Connecticut was the regular-season champion of the Big East 6 Division with a record of 15–3. It was Connecticut's fifth regular-season championship or co-championship and second divisional title.
- Syracuse won the regular-season Big East 7 Division championship with a record of 12–7. It was Syracuse's sixth regular-season championship or co-championship and first divisional title.
- Connecticut won its third Big East tournament championship.

== Head coaches ==
School	Coach	Season	Notes
Boston College	Al Skinner	1st	
Connecticut	Jim Calhoun	12th	Big East Coach of the Year (4th award)
Georgetown	John Thompson, Jr.	26th	
Miami	Leonard Hamilton	8th	
Notre Dame	John MacLeod	7th	
Pittsburgh	Ralph Willard	4th	
Providence	Pete Gillen	4th	Resigned March 27, 1998
Rutgers	Kevin Bannon	1st	
St. John's	Fran Fraschilla	2nd	Fired May 13, 1998
Seton Hall	Tommy Amaker	1st	
Syracuse	Jim Boeheim	22nd	
Villanova	Steve Lappas	6th	
West Virginia	Gale Catlett	20th	

== Rankings ==
Connecticut was ranked in the Associated Press poll Top 25 all season, finishing at No. 6. West Virginia and Syracuse also spent time in the Top 25, with Syracuse ending the season ranked No. 21.

1997–98 Big East Conference Weekly Rankings Key: ██ Increase in ranking. ██ Decrease in ranking.
AP Poll	Pre	11/17	11/24	12/1	12/8	12/15	12/22	12/29	1/5	1/12	1/19	1/26	2/2	2/9	2/16	2/23	3/2	Final
Boston College																		
Connecticut	12	12	11	13	13	12	11	10	8	10	8	9	7	6	7	6	6	6
Georgetown																		
Miami																		
Notre Dame																		
Pittsburgh																		
Providence																		
Rutgers																		
St. John's																		
Seton Hall																		
Syracuse						25	19	19	18	15	15	20	19	23	21	23	22	21
Villanova																		
West Virginia							23	22	25	21	23	17	15	16	20	19	23	

== Regular-season statistical leaders ==
Scoring
Name	School	PPG
Pat Garrity	ND	23.2
Richard Hamilton	Conn	21.5
Vonteego Cummings	Pitt	19.5
Jamel Thomas	Prov	18.5
Antonio Granger	BC	17.9

Rebounding
Name	School	RPG
Tim James	Mia	9.4
Isaac Hawkins	Pitt	9.2
Zendon Hamilton	SJU	8.7
Pat Garrity	ND	8.3
Ryan Blackwell	Syr	8.2

Assists
Name	School	APG
Shaheen Holloway	SHU	6.5
Vonteego Cummings	Pitt	5.9
Martin Ingelsby	ND	5.6
John Celestand	Vill	5.1
Duane Woodward	BC	5.1

Steals
Name	School	SPG
Damian Owens	WVU	3.0
Vonteego Cummings	Pitt	2.5
Kevin Norris	Mia	2.4
Jarrod West	WVU	2.3
Shernard Long	GU	2.3

Blocks
Name	School	BPG
Etan Thomas	Syr	3.9
Attila Cosby	Pitt	2.0
Isaac Hawkins	Pitt	1.7
Tim James	Mia	1.6
Malik Allen	Vill	1.4

Field Goals
Name	School	FG%
Kostas Maglos	BC	.591
Isaac Hawkins	Pitt	.541
Damian Owens	WVU	.506
Tim James	Mia	.485
Pat Garrity	ND	.481

3-Pt Field Goals
Name	School	3FG%
Richard Hamilton	Conn	.404
Geoff Billet	RU	.390
Antonio Granger	BC	.390
Levell Sanders	SHU	.354
(no other qualifiers)

Free Throws
Name	School	FT%
Richard Hamilton	Conn	.843
Levell Sanders	SHU	.835
Rob Hodgson	RU	.835
Lavor Postell	SJU	.826
Geoff Billet	RU	.826

== Postseason ==
=== Big East tournament ===
==== Seeding ====
The division winner with the best record received the No. 1 seed in the Big East tournament, the division winner with the second-best record received the No. 2 seed, and the second-place finisher with the best record received the No. 3 seed. The rest of the schools were seeded fourth through thirteenth based on conference record and tiebreakers. Teams seeded fourth through thirteenth played a first-round game, and the other three teams received a bye into the second round.

The tournament's seeding was as follows: (1) Connecticut, (2) Syracuse, (3) St. John's, (4) Miami, (5) West Virginia, (6) Seton Hall, (7) Villanova, (8) Providence, (9) Notre Dame, (10) Pittsburgh, (11) Boston College, (12) Rutgers, (13) Georgetown.

==== Bracket ====
First round March 4, 1998
8	Providence	72
9	Notre Dame	55
5	#23 West Virginia	65
12	Rutgers	72
4	Miami	56
13	Georgetown	62
6	Seton Hall	87
11	Boston College	97^{OT}
7	Villanova	96^{2OT}
10	Pittsburgh	93

Quarterfinals; March 5, 1998
1	#6 Connecticut	64
8	Providence	55
12	Rutgers	61
13	Georgetown	60
3	St. John's	91
11	Boston College	80
2	#22 Syracuse	69
7	Villanova	66

Semifinals; March 6, 1998
1	#6 Connecticut	64
12	Rutgers	50
3	St. John's	67
2	#22 Syracuse	69^{OT}

Championship Game; March 7, 1998
1	#6 Connecticut	69
2	#22 Syracuse	64

=== NCAA tournament ===
Five Big East teams received bids to the NCAA Tournament. Miami and St. John's lost in the first round and Syracuse and West Virginia in the regional semifinals. Connecticut was defeated in the East Region final.

School	Region	Seed	Round 1	Round 2	Sweet 16	Elite 8
Connecticut	East	2	15 Fairleigh Dickinson, W 93–85	7 Indiana, W 78–68	11 Washington, W 75–74	1 North Carolina, L 75–64
Syracuse	South	5	12 Iona, W 63–61	4 New Mexico, W 56–46	1 Duke, L 80–67	
West Virginia	West	10	7 Temple, W 82–52	2 Cincinnati, W 75–74	3 Utah, L 65–62	
St. John's	Midwest	7	10 Detroit, L 66–64			
Miami	South	11	6 UCLA, L 65–62			

=== National Invitation Tournament ===
Two Big East teams received bids to the National Invitation Tournament, which did not yet have seeding. They played in the same unnamed bracket and both lost to Georgia Tech, Seton Hall in the first round and Georgetown in the second.

School	Round 1	Round 2
Georgetown	Florida, W 71–69	Georgia Tech, L 80–79
Seton Hall	Georgia Tech, L 88–70	

== Awards and honors ==
=== Big East Conference ===
Player of the Year:

- Richard Hamilton, Connecticut, G, So.

Defensive Player of the Year:

- Damian Owens, West Virginia, F, Sr.

Rookie of the Year:

- Khalid El-Amin, Connecticut, G, Fr.

Most Improved Player:

- Etan Thomas, Syracuse, C, So.

Coach of the Year:

- Jim Calhoun, Notre Dame (12th season)

All-Big East First Team

- Richard Hamilton, Connecticut, G, So., 5 ft 11 in (180 cm), 180 lb (82 kg), Coatesville, Pa.
- Tim James, Miami, F, Jr., 6 ft 7 in (201 cm), 212 lb (96 kg), Miami, Fla.
- Pat Garrity, Notre Dame, F, Sr., 6 ft 9 in (206 cm), 238 lb (108 kg), Las Vegas, Nev.
- Felipe López, St. John's, G, Sr., 6 ft 5 in (196 cm), 199 lb (90 kg), Santo Domingo, Dominican Republic
- Damian Owens, West Virginia, F, Jr., 6 ft 6 in (198 cm), 215 lb (98 kg), Seat Pleasant, Md.

All-Big East Second Team:

- Vonteego Cummings, Pittsburgh, G, Jr., 6 ft 3 in (191 cm), 190 lb (86 kg), Thomson, Ga.
- Jamel Thomas, Providence, F, Jr., 6 ft 6 in (198 cm), 215 lb (98 kg), Brooklyn, N.Y.
- Levell Sanders, Seton Hall, G, Sr., 6 ft 2 in (188 cm), 207 lb (94 kg), Brooklyn, N.Y.
- Zendon Hamilton, St. John's, C, Sr., 6 ft 9 in (206 cm), 240 lb (109 kg), South Floral Park, N.Y.
- Todd Burgan, Syracuse, F, Sr., 6 ft 7 in (201 cm), 21 lb (10 kg), Detroit, Mich.

All-Big East Third Team:

- Antonio Granger, Boston College, F, Sr., 6 ft 7 in (201 cm), 215 lb (98 kg), Detroit, Mich.
- Duane Woodward, Boston College, G, Sr., 6 ft 3 in (191 cm), 209 lb (95 kg), New York, N.Y.
- Khalid El-Amin, Connecticut, G, Fr., 5 ft 10 in (178 cm), 200 lb (91 kg), Minneapolis, Minn.
- Shaheen Holloway, Seton Hall, G, So., 5 ft 10 in (178 cm), 173 lb (78 kg), Queens, N.Y.
- Etan Thomas, Syracuse, C, So., 6 ft 10 in (208 cm), 260 lb (118 kg), New York, N.Y.

Big East All-Rookie Team:

- Khalid El-Amin, Connecticut, G, Fr., 5 ft 10 in (178 cm), 200 lb (91 kg), Minneapolis, Minn.
- Martin Ingelsby, Notre Dame, G, Fr., 6 ft 0 in (183 cm), 182 lb (83 kg), Philadelphia, Pa.
- Ricardo Greer, Pittsburgh, F, Fr., 6 ft 5 in (196 cm), 200 lb (91 kg), New York, N.Y.
- Jeff Greer, Rutgers, G, Fr., 6 ft 5 in (196 cm), 180 lb (82 kg), The Bronx, N.Y.
- Metta World Peace, St. John's, F, Fr., 6 ft 6 in (198 cm), 244 lb (111 kg), Queens, N.Y.

=== All-Americans ===
The following players were selected to the 1998 Associated Press All-America teams.

Consensus All-America Second Team:

- Pat Garrity, Notre Dame, Key Stats: 23.2 ppg, 8.3 rpg, 2.4 apg, 48.1 FG%, 37.0 3P%, 627 points
- Richard Hamilton, Connecticut, Key Stats: 21.5 ppg, 4.4 rpg, 2.4 apg, 1.5 spg, 44.0 FG%, 40.4 3P%, 795 points

Second Team All-America:

- Pat Garrity, Notre Dame, Key Stats: 23.2 ppg, 8.3 rpg, 2.4 apg, 48.1 FG%, 37.0 3P%, 627 points
- Richard Hamilton, Connecticut, Key Stats: 21.5 ppg, 4.4 rpg, 2.4 apg, 1.5 spg, 44.0 FG%, 40.4 3P%, 795 points

AP Honorable Mention

- Khalid El-Amin, Connecticut

== See also ==
- 1997–98 NCAA Division I men's basketball season
- 1997–98 Connecticut Huskies men's basketball team
- 1997–98 Georgetown Hoyas men's basketball team
- 1997–98 Miami Hurricanes men's basketball team
- 1997–98 Notre Dame Fighting Irish men's basketball team
- 1997–98 Pittsburgh Panthers men's basketball team
- 1997–98 St. John's Red Storm men's basketball team
- 1997–98 Syracuse Orangemen basketball team
- 1997–98 West Virginia Mountaineers men's basketball team
