= 1998 MAAC men's basketball tournament =

- Classification: Division I
- Season: 1997–98
- Teams: 10
- Site: Pepsi Arena; Albany, New York
- Champions: Iona (4th title)
- Winning coach: Tim Welsh (1st title)
- MVP: John McDonald (Iona)

1997–98 MAAC men's basketball standings
| | Conf. | | | | Overall |
| Team | W | | L | PCT | W | | L | PCT |
|---|---|---|---|---|---|---|---|---|
| Iona † | 15 | – | 3 | .833 | 27 | – | 6 | .818 |
| Rider | 12 | – | 6 | .667 | 18 | – | 10 | .643 |
| Siena | 10 | – | 8 | .556 | 17 | – | 12 | .586 |
| Niagara | 10 | – | 8 | .556 | 14 | – | 13 | .519 |
| Loyola (MD) | 9 | – | 9 | .500 | 12 | – | 16 | .429 |
| Canisius | 9 | – | 9 | .500 | 13 | – | 14 | .481 |
| Manhattan | 7 | – | 11 | .389 | 12 | – | 17 | .414 |
| Marist | 7 | – | 11 | .389 | 11 | – | 17 | .393 |
| Fairfield | 7 | – | 11 | .389 | 12 | – | 15 | .444 |
| Saint Peter's | 4 | – | 14 | .222 | 8 | – | 19 | .296 |
† 1998 MAAC tournament winner Rankings from AP Poll

The 1998 MAAC men's basketball tournament was held February 27–March 2, 1998 at Pepsi Arena in Albany, New York.

Top-seeded Iona defeated Siena in the championship game, 90–75, to win their first MAAC men's basketball tournament.

The Gaels received an automatic bid to the 1998 NCAA tournament.

== Format ==
All ten of the conference's members participated in the tournament field. They were seeded based on regular season conference records.

== Bracket ==
First round Friday, February 27
8 | Marist | 74
9 | Fairfield | 73^{OT}
7 | Manhattan | 66
10 | Saint Peter's | 55

Quarterfinals; Saturday, February 28
1 | Iona | 76
8 | Marist | 55
4 | Niagara | 80^{OT}
5 | Loyola (MD) | 85
2 | Rider | 58
7 | Manhattan | 71
3 | Siena | 87
6 | Canisius | 83^{OT}

Semifinals; Sunday, March 1
1 | Iona | 69
5 | Loyola (MD) | 58
7 | Manhattan | 71
3 | Siena | 77

Championship; Monday, March 2
1 | Iona | 90
3 | Siena | 75
