= 1997–98 St. John's Red Storm men's basketball team =

American college basketball season

1997–98 St. John's Red Storm men's basketball

NCAA men's Division I tournament, first round
- Conference: Big East Conference
- Record: 22–10 (13–5 Big East)
- Head coach: Fran Fraschilla (2nd season)
- Assistant coaches: Tom Billeter; Ron Rutledge; Darren Savino
- Captains: Tarik Turner; Felipe Lopez; Zendon Hamilton
- Home arena: Alumni Hall; Madison Square Garden

1997–98 Big East men's basketball standings
	Conf.				Overall
Team	W		L	PCT	W		L	PCT
Big East 6
No. 6 Connecticut†	15	–	3	.833	32	–	5	.865
St. John's	13	–	5	.722	22	–	10	.688
West Virginia	11	–	7	.611	24	–	9	.727
Villanova	8	–	10	.444	12	–	17	.414
Notre Dame	7	–	11	.389	13	–	14	.481
Boston College	6	–	12	.333	15	–	16	.484
Big East 7
No. 21 Syracuse	12	–	6	.667	26	–	9	.743
Miami	11	–	7	.611	18	–	10	.643
Seton Hall	9	–	9	.500	15	–	15	.500
Providence	7	–	11	.389	13	–	16	.448
Pittsburgh	6	–	12	.333	11	–	16	.407
Rutgers	6	–	12	.333	14	–	15	.483
Georgetown	6	–	12	.333	16	–	15	.516
† 1998 Big East tournament winner As of March 30, 1998; Rankings from AP poll

The 1997–98 St. John's Red Storm men's basketball team represented St. John's University during the 1997–98 NCAA Division I men's basketball season. The team was coached by Fran Fraschilla in his second year at the school. St. John's home games are played at Alumni Hall and Madison Square Garden and the team is a member of the Big East Conference.

== Off season ==
=== Departures ===
Name	Number	Pos.	Height	Year	Hometown	Notes
Ed Brown	14	F	6'8"	RS Freshman	Copiague, New York	Transferred to Rhode Island
Mike Menniefield	21	F/C	6'8"	Senior	Greenville, South Carolina	Graduated
Charles Minlend	34	F	6'6"	RS Senior	Cameroon, Africa	Graduated

=== Class of 1997 signees ===
College recruiting information
Name	Hometown	School	Height	Weight	Commit date
Ron Artest; SF	Queensbridge, NY	La Salle Academy	6 ft 6 in (1.98 m)	N/A	
Ron Artest; SF	Recruit ratings: No ratings found				
Reggie Jessie; SF	Queensbridge, NY	Bishop Loughlin High School	6 ft 7 in (2.01 m)	N/A	
Reggie Jessie; SF	Recruit ratings: No ratings found				
Shannon Crooks; PG	Boston, MA	Everett High School	6 ft 2 in (1.88 m)	N/A	
Shannon Crooks; PG	Recruit ratings: No ratings found				
James Felton; PF	Bayonne, NJ	Marist High School	6 ft 9 in (2.06 m)	N/A	
James Felton; PF	Recruit ratings: No ratings found				
Milos Dumic; C	Bijeljina, Yugoslavia	St. Joseph by the Sea High School	6 ft 9 in (2.06 m)	N/A	
Milos Dumic; C	Recruit ratings: No ratings found				
Overall recruit ranking:
Note: In many cases, Scout, Rivals, 247Sports, On3, and ESPN may conflict in their listings of height and weight.; In these cases, the average was taken. ESPN grades are on a 100-point scale.; Sources: "1997 Team Ranking". Rivals.

== Roster ==
1997–98 St. John's Red Storm men's basketball team
Players
Coaches
\

Pos.	#	Name	Height	Weight	Year	Previous school	Hometown
G	3	Chudney Gray	6 ft 3 in (1.91 m)	—	So	Rice	Bronx, NY
G	4	Tarik Turner (C)	6 ft 5 in (1.96 m)	—	Sr	Oak Hill	Charlottesville, VA
G	10	Kareem Syed (W)	6 ft 5 in (1.96 m)	—	So	Hillcrest	Queens, NY
G	11	Collin Charles	5 ft 11 in (1.8 m)	—	So	Eastern Commerce	Toronto, Ontario
G	13	Felipe López (C)	6 ft 6 in (1.98 m)	—	Sr	Rice	Santo Domingo, D.R.
G/F	15	Ron Artest	6 ft 6 in (1.98 m)	—	Fr	La Salle	Queensbridge, NY
F/C	21	Milos Dumic	6 ft 10 in (2.08 m)	—	Fr	St. Joseph by the Sea	Bijeljina, Yugoslavia
F	24	Giovanni Soto (W)	6 ft 7 in (2.01 m)	—	Sr	Park West	Far Rockaway, NY
G/F	25	Lavor Postell	6 ft 5 in (1.96 m)	—	So	Westover	Albany, GA
G	30	Shannon Crooks	6 ft 2 in (1.88 m)	—	Fr	Everett	Everett, MA
C	31	Zendon Hamilton (C)	6 ft 11 in (2.11 m)	—	Sr	Sewanhaka	Floral Park, NY
F	32	Tyrone Grant	6 ft 7 in (2.01 m)	—	Jr	Grady	Brooklyn, NY
G/F	41	Reggie Jessie	6 ft 7 in (2.01 m)	—	Fr	Bishop Loughlin	Queensbridge, NY
F		James Felton	6 ft 9 in (2.06 m)	—	Fr	Marist HS (NJ)	Bayonne, NJ

Head coach

- Fran Fraschilla (Brooklyn College, '80)

Assistant coach(es)

- Tom Billeter (Illinois, '83)
- Ron Rutledge (St. John's, '84)
- Darren Savino (Jersey City State, '93)

Legend

- (C) Team captain
- (S) Suspended
- (I) Ineligible
- (W) Walk-on
- Injured
- Current redshirt

== Schedule and results ==
Date time, TV	Rank^{#}	Opponent^{#}	Result	Record	Site city, state
Regular season
11/15/97*		Lafayette	W 72-49	1-0	Alumni Hall; Queens, NY
11/22/97*		St. Francis (N.Y.)	W 83-73	2-0	Alumni Hall; Queens, NY
11/27/97*		vs. AUPR; Puerto Rico Shootout Opening Round	W 93-81	3-0	Eugene Guerra Sports Complex; San Juan, PR
11/28/97*		vs. Georgia Tech; Puerto Rico Shootout Semifinal	L 65-77	3-1	Eugene Guerra Sports Complex; San Juan, PR
11/29/97*		vs. Illinois; Puerto Rico Shootout Consolation	W 83-66	4-1	Eugene Guerra Sports Complex; San Juan, PR
12/03/97		Syracuse	L 73-80	4-2 (0-1)	Madison Square Garden; New York, NY
12/06/97		at West Virginia	L 70-86	4-3 (0-2)	WVU Coliseum; Morgantown, WV
12/09/97*		Colgate	W 69-53	5-3 (0-2)	Alumni Hall; Queens, NY
12/17/97*		at Manhattan	W 84-60	6-3 (0-2)	Draddy Gymnasium; New York, NY
12/20/97*		DePaul	W 74-70 ^{2OT}	7-3 (0-2)	Alumni Hall; Queens, NY
12/26/97*		Niagara; ECAC Holiday Festival Semifinal	L 63-86	7-4 (0-2)	Madison Square Garden; New York, NY
12/27/97*		Drexel; ECAC Holiday Festival Consolation	W 75-46	8-4 (0-2)	Madison Square Garden; New York, NY
12/30/97		at Notre Dame	W 79-69	9-4 (1-2)	Joyce Center; Notre Dame, IN
01/03/98		Seton Hall	L 59-61	9-5 (1-3)	Madison Square Garden; New York, NY
01/06/98*		at Louisville	L 67-73	9-6 (1-3)	Freedom Hall; Louisville, KY
01/10/98		at Georgetown	W 66-60	10-6 (2-3)	MCI Center; Washington, D.C.
01/13/98		Miami (F.L.)	W 73-64	11-6 (3-3)	Alumni Hall; Queens, NY
01/17/98		at Providence	W 63-56	12-6 (4-3)	Providence Civic Center; Providence, RI
01/19/98		No. 10 Connecticut	W 64-62	13-6 (5-3)	Madison Square Garden; New York, NY
01/22/98		at Pittsburgh	W 90-83 ^{2OT}	14-6 (6-3)	Fitzgerald Field House; Pittsburgh, PA
01/25/98		Villanova	W 82-59	15-6 (7-3)	Madison Square Garden; New York, NY
01/28/98		Rutgers	W 76-58	16-6 (8-3)	Madison Square Garden; New York, NY
01/31/98		Notre Dame	L 65-73	16-7 (8-4)	Madison Square Garden; New York, NY
02/04/98		at Boston College	W 91-79	17-7 (9-4)	Silvio O. Conte Forum; Chestnut Hill, MA
02/07/98		No. 15 West Virginia	W 77-69	18-7 (10-4)	Alumni Hall; Queens, NY
02/15/98		at Seton Hall	W 64-60	19-7 (11-4)	Continental Airlines Arena; East Rutherford, NJ
02/18/98		Boston College	W 66-61	20-7 (12-4)	Madison Square Garden; New York, NY
02/24/98		at No. 23 Syracuse	W 67-65	21-7 (13-4)	Carrier Dome; Syracuse, NY
02/28/98		at No. 6 Connecticut	L 58-87	21-8 (13-5)	Gampel Pavilion; Storrs, CT
Big East tournament
03/05/98		vs. Boston College; Big East tournament quarterfinal	W 91-80	22-8 (13-5)	Madison Square Garden; New York, NY
03/06/98		vs. No. 22 Syracuse; Big East tournament semifinal	L 67-69 ^{OT}	22-9 (13-5)	Madison Square Garden; New York, NY
NCAA tournament
03/13/98	(7 MW)	vs. (10 MW) Detroit Mercy; NCAA First Round	L 64-66	22-10 (13-5)	United Center; Chicago, IL
*Non-conference game. ^{#}Rankings from AP Poll. (#) Tournament seedings in parentheses.

== Team players drafted into the NBA ==
Round	Pick	Player	NBA club
1	24	Felipe Lopez	San Antonio Spurs traded to the Vancouver Grizzlies
