= 1997–98 Syracuse Orangemen basketball team =

American college basketball season

1997–98 Syracuse Orangemen men's basketball

NCAA tournament, Sweet Sixteen
- Conference: Big East Conference

Ranking
- Coaches: No. 13
- AP: No. 21
- Record: 26–9 (12–6 Big East)
- Head coach: Jim Boeheim (22nd season)
- Assistant coaches: Bernie Fine (22nd season); Mike Hopkins (3rd season)
- Home arena: Carrier Dome

1997–98 Big East men's basketball standings
	Conf.				Overall
Team	W		L	PCT	W		L	PCT
Big East 6
No. 6 Connecticut†	15	–	3	.833	32	–	5	.865
St. John's	13	–	5	.722	22	–	10	.688
West Virginia	11	–	7	.611	24	–	9	.727
Villanova	8	–	10	.444	12	–	17	.414
Notre Dame	7	–	11	.389	13	–	14	.481
Boston College	6	–	12	.333	15	–	16	.484
Big East 7
No. 21 Syracuse	12	–	6	.667	26	–	9	.743
Miami	11	–	7	.611	18	–	10	.643
Seton Hall	9	–	9	.500	15	–	15	.500
Providence	7	–	11	.389	13	–	16	.448
Pittsburgh	6	–	12	.333	11	–	16	.407
Rutgers	6	–	12	.333	14	–	15	.483
Georgetown	6	–	12	.333	16	–	15	.516
† 1998 Big East tournament winner As of March 30, 1998; Rankings from AP poll

The 1997–98 Syracuse Orangemen basketball team represented Syracuse University as a member of the Big East Conference during the 1997–98 NCAA Division I men's basketball season. The head coach was Jim Boeheim, serving for his 22nd year. The team played its home games at the Carrier Dome in Syracuse, New York. The team finished with a 26–9 (12–6) record, while making it to the Sweet Sixteen of the NCAA tournament.

The team was led by senior Todd Burgan and sophomores Ryan Blackwell, Etan Thomas and Jason Hart.

== Roster ==
1997–98 Syracuse Orange men's basketball team
Players
Coaches

Pos.	#	Name	Height	Weight	Year	Hometown
G	5	Jason Hart	6 ft 3 in (1.91 m)	185 lb (84 kg)	So	Westchester, California
F	25	Damone Brown	6 ft 8 in (2.03 m)	200 lb (91 kg)	Fr	Buffalo, New York
G/F	30	Todd Burgan	6 ft 7 in (2.01 m)	230 lb (104 kg)	Sr	Detroit, Michigan
F	32	Ryan Blackwell	6 ft 7 in (2.01 m)	220 lb (100 kg)	So	Pittsford, New York
C	33	Etan Thomas	6 ft 9 in (2.06 m)	245 lb (111 kg)	So	Tulsa, Oklahoma

Head coach

- Jim Boeheim (Syracuse)

Assistant coach(es)

- Bernie Fine (Syracuse)
- Mike Hopkins (Syracuse)

Legend

- (C) Team captain
- (S) Suspended
- (I) Ineligible
- (W) Walk-on
- Injured
- Current redshirt

Roster

== Schedule and results ==
Date time, TV	Rank^{#}	Opponent^{#}	Result	Record	Site city, state
Regular season
Nov 15, 1997*		UNC Asheville	W 60–57	1–0	Carrier Dome; Syracuse, New York
Nov 22, 1997*		UNC Greensboro	W 83–53	2–0	Carrier Dome; Syracuse, New York
Nov 30, 1997*		Colgate	W 78–74	3–0	Carrier Dome; Syracuse, New York
Dec 3, 1997		at St. John's	W 80–73	4–0 (1–0)	Madison Square Garden; New York, New York
Dec 6, 1997		at Boston College	W 70–52	5–0 (2–0)	Silvio O. Conte Forum; Boston, Massachusetts
Dec 12, 1997*		Texas Southern	W 85–73	6–0	Carrier Dome; Syracuse, New York
Dec 13, 1997*		Miami (OH)	W 72–53	7–0	Carrier Dome; Syracuse, New York
Dec 18, 1997*	No. 25	Buffalo	W 82–70	8–0	Carrier Dome; Syracuse, New York
Dec 20, 1997*	No. 25	at UNLV	W 71–64	9–0	Thomas & Mack Center; Las Vegas, Nevada
Dec 24, 1997*	No. 19	vs. Saint Louis; Puerto Rico Holiday Classic	W 67–64	10–0	Eugene Guerra Sports Complex; San Juan, Puerto Rico
Dec 25, 1997*	No. 19	vs. No. 25 TCU; Puerto Rico Holiday Classic	W 82–78	11–0	Eugene Guerra Sports Complex; San Juan, Puerto Rico
Dec 26, 1997*	No. 19	vs. Michigan; Puerto Rico Holiday Classic	L 61–93	11–1	Eugene Guerra Sports Complex; San Juan, Puerto Rico
Jan 4, 1998	No. 19	Rutgers	W 71–68	12–1 (3–0)	Carrier Dome; Syracuse, New York
Jan 7, 1998	No. 18	at Providence	W 77–59	13–1 (4–0)	Providence Civic Center; Providence, Rhode Island
Jan 10, 1998*	No. 18	Louisville	W 69–65	14–1	Carrier Dome; Syracuse, New York
Jan 13, 1998	No. 16	Providence	L 64–76	14–2 (4–1)	Carrier Dome; Syracuse, New York
Jan 18, 1998	No. 16	Miami (FL)	W 85–67	15–2 (5–1)	Carrier Dome; Syracuse, New York
Big East Tournament
Mar 5, 1998*	No. 22	vs. Villanova; Quarterfinals	W 69–66	23–7	Madison Square Garden; New York, New York
Mar 6, 1998*	No. 22	at St. John's; Semifinals	W 69–67 ^{OT}	24–7	Madison Square Garden; New York, New York
Mar 7, 1998*	No. 22	vs. No. 6 Connecticut; Championship Game	L 64–69	24–8	Madison Square Garden; New York, New York
NCAA Tournament
Mar 13, 1998*	(5 S) No. 21	vs. (12 S) Iona; Second Round	W 63–61	25–8	Rupp Arena; Lexington, Kentucky
Mar 15, 1998*	(5 S) No. 21	vs. (4 S) No. 18 New Mexico; Second Round	W 56–46	26–8	Rupp Arena; Lexington, Kentucky
Mar 20, 1998*	(5 S) No. 21	vs. (1 S) No. 3 Duke; South Regional semifinal – Sweet Sixteen	L 67–80	26–9	Tropicana Field; St. Petersburg, Florida
*Non-conference game. ^{#}Rankings from AP Poll. (#) Tournament seedings in parentheses. S=South.
