= 1997–98 St. Francis Terriers men's basketball team =

American college basketball season

1997–98 St. Francis Terriers men's basketball
- Conference: Northeast Conference
- Record: 15–12 (10–6 NEC)
- Head coach: Ron Ganulin (7th season)
- Assistant coach: Glenn Braica (9th season)
- Home arena: Generoso Pope Athletic Complex

1997–98 Northeast Conference men's basketball standings
| | Conf. | | | | Overall |
| Team | W | | L | PCT | W | | L | PCT |
|---|---|---|---|---|---|---|---|---|
| Long Island | 14 | – | 2 | .875 | 21 | – | 11 | .656 |
| Fairleigh Dickinson † | 13 | – | 3 | .813 | 23 | – | 7 | .767 |
| St. Francis (NY) | 10 | – | 6 | .625 | 15 | – | 12 | .556 |
| Saint Francis (PA) | 10 | – | 6 | .625 | 17 | – | 10 | .630 |
| Mount St. Mary's | 8 | – | 8 | .500 | 13 | – | 15 | .464 |
| Wagner | 7 | – | 9 | .438 | 13 | – | 16 | .448 |
| Robert Morris | 4 | – | 12 | .250 | 8 | – | 19 | .296 |
| Monmouth | 3 | – | 13 | .188 | 4 | – | 23 | .148 |
| Central Connecticut | 3 | – | 13 | .188 | 4 | – | 22 | .154 |
† 1998 NEC tournament winner Rankings from AP Poll

The 1997–98 St. Francis Terriers men's basketball team represented St. Francis College during the 1997–98 NCAA Division I men's basketball season. The team had been coached by Ron Ganulin in his seventh year at the helm of the St. Francis Terriers. The Terrier's home games were played at the Generoso Pope Athletic Complex. The team had been members of the Northeast Conference since 1981.

The Terriers finished their season at 15–12 overall and 10–6 in conference play. With the third seed in the NEC Tournament, St. Francis had played in the quarterfinals and lost to Wagner 76–77 in overtime. After the season had ended, Ron Ganulin was announced as the NEC Coach of the Year and Richy Dominguez was named Newcomer of the Year.

== Roster ==
1997–98 St. Francis Brooklyn Terriers men's basketball team
Players
Coaches

| Pos. | # | Name | Height | Weight | Year | Hometown |
|---|---|---|---|---|---|---|
| G | 12 | John Thomas | 5 ft 9 in (1.75 m) | — | Sr |
| F | 5 | Ralph Auriantal | 6 ft 7 in (2.01 m) | — | Sr | Montreal, Canada |
| G | 14 | Solomon Abel | 5 ft 11 in (1.8 m) | 175 lb (79 kg) | Jr | Bronx, New York |
| G | 25 | Ray Minlend | 6 ft 2 in (1.88 m) | 190 lb (86 kg) | Jr | Yaounde, Cameroon |
| F | 30 | Anthony Rogers | 6 ft 7 in (2.01 m) | 220 lb (100 kg) | Jr | Carteret, New Jersey |
| G | 32 | Tim Rail | 6 ft 3 in (1.91 m) | 185 lb (84 kg) | Jr | Staten Island, New York |
| F | 24 | Angel Santana | 6 ft 7 in (2.01 m) | 210 lb (95 kg) | So | Las Palmas, Spain |
| F | 34 | Henry Lalane | 6 ft 6 in (1.98 m) | 190 lb (86 kg) | So | Vista, California |
| F | 42 | Gerald Walker | 6 ft 7 in (2.01 m) | 215 lb (98 kg) | So | Pittsburgh, Pennsylvania |
| F | 13 | Priit Ilver | 6 ft 8 in (2.03 m) | 225 lb (102 kg) | So | Tallinn, Estonia |
| F | 44 | Marcel Dimbeng | 6 ft 7 in (2.01 m) | 235 lb (107 kg) | So | Douala, Cameroon |
| F | 13 | Roque Osorio | 6 ft 9 in (2.06 m) | — | So | Venezuela |
| G | 33 | Richy Dominguez | 6 ft 5 in (1.96 m) | 195 lb (88 kg) | Fr | Chocó, Colombia |
| C | 40 | Heberth Reyes | 6 ft 11 in (2.11 m) | 245 lb (111 kg) | Fr | San Antonio, Venezuela |
| G | 3 | Greg Nunn | 5 ft 10 in (1.78 m) | 180 lb (82 kg) | Fr | Inwood, New York |

Head coach

- Ron Ganulin (LIU Brooklyn '67)

Assistant coach(es)

- Glenn Braica (Queens College '89)

Legend

- (C) Team captain
- (S) Suspended
- (I) Ineligible
- (W) Walk-on
- Injured
- Current redshirt

== Schedule and results ==
| Date time, TV | Opponent | Result | Record | Site (attendance) city, state |
Regular season
| November 22, 1997* | at St. John's | L 73–83 | 0–1 | Carnesecca Arena (6,008); Jamaica, NY |
| November 29, 1997* | Columbia | W 79–53 | 1–1 | Generoso Pope Athletic Complex (412); Brooklyn, NY |
| December 3, 1997* | at South Florida | L 66–81 | 1–2 | USF Sun Dome (3,571); Tampa, FL |
| December 6, 1997* | at Brown | W 65–64 | 2–2 | Pizzitola Sports Center (475); Providence, RI |
| December 8, 1997* | Lehigh | W 83–73 | 3–2 | Generoso Pope Athletic Complex (231); Brooklyn, NY |
| December 11, 1997* | Sacred Heart | W 76–61 | 4–2 | Generoso Pope Athletic Complex (152); Brooklyn, NY |
| December 15, 1997 | at Wagner | L 71–76 | 4–3 (0–1) | Spiro Sports Center (1,648); Staten Island, NY |
| December 20, 1997* | at Long Beach State | W 92–83 | 5–3 | Walter Pyramid (1,939); Long Beach, CA |
| December 22, 1997* | at San Diego State | L 78–86 | 5–4 | Viejas Arena (1,014); San Diego, CA |
| January 3, 1998 | at Monmouth | W 76–64 | 6–4 (1–1) | William T. Boylan Gymnasium (1,118); West Long Branch, NJ |
| January 5, 1998 | Wagner | W 77–63 | 7–4 (2–1) | Generoso Pope Athletic Complex (168); Brooklyn, NY |
| January 8, 1998 | at Mount St. Mary's | L 73–79 | 7–5 (2–2) | Knott Arena (908); Emmitsburg, MD |
| January 10, 1998 | Fairleigh Dickinson | L 69–72 | 7–6 (2–3) | Generoso Pope Athletic Complex (213); Brooklyn, NY |
| January 13, 1998* | at Yale | L 63–79 | 7–7 | Payne Whitney Gymnasium (357); New Haven, CT |
| January 16, 1998 | Long Island | L 76–80 | 7–8 (2–4) | Generoso Pope Athletic Complex (1,024); Brooklyn, NY |
| January 19, 1998 | Central Connecticut | W 78–55 | 8–8 (3–4) | Generoso Pope Athletic Complex (204); Brooklyn, NY |
| January 22, 1998 | at Saint Francis (PA) | W 68–57 | 9–8 (4–4) | DeGol Arena (1,034); Loretto, PA |
| January 24, 1998 | at Robert Morris | W 62–57 | 10–8 (5–4) | Charles L. Sewall Center (1,412); Moon Township, PA |
| January 27, 1998* | Iona | L 69–100 | 10–9 | Generoso Pope Athletic Complex (436); Brooklyn, NY |
| January 31, 1998 | at Fairleigh Dickinson | L 67–71 | 10–10 (5–5) | Rothman Center (3,376); Hackensack, NJ |
| February 2, 1998 | Mount St. Mary's | W 70–63 ^{OT} | 11–10 (6–5) | Generoso Pope Athletic Complex (237); Brooklyn, NY |
| February 7, 1998 | Monmouth | W 60–50 | 12–10 (7–5) | Generoso Pope Athletic Complex (362); Brooklyn, NY |
| February 10, 1998 | Saint Francis (PA) | W 64–58 ^{OT} | 13–10 (8–5) | Generoso Pope Athletic Complex (204); Brooklyn, NY |
| February 16, 1998 | Robert Morris | W 66–55 ^{OT} | 14–10 (9–5) | Generoso Pope Athletic Complex (327); Brooklyn, NY |
| February 19, 1998 | at Long Island; Battle of Brooklyn | L 71–86 | 14–11 (9–6) | Schwartz Athletic Center (1,300); Brooklyn, NY |
| February 21, 1998 | at Central Connecticut | W 61–53 | 15–11 (10–6) | William H. Detrick Gymnasium (610); New Britain, CT |
1998 NEC tournament
| February 26, 1998 | vs. Wagner; Quarterfinals | L 76–77 ^{OT} | 15–12 | William H. Detrick Gymnasium (150); New Britain, CT |
*Non-conference game. ^{#}Rankings from AP Poll. (#) Tournament seedings in parentheses.
