= 1998 Northeast Conference men's basketball tournament =

American postseason men's college basketball tournament

- Classification: Division I
- Season: 1997–98
- Teams: 8
- Site: William H. Detrick Gymnasium; New Britain, CT
- Finals site: Schwartz Athletic Center; Brooklyn, NY
- Champions: Fairleigh Dickinson (3rd title)
- Winning coach: Tom Green (3rd title)
- MVP: Rahshon Turner (Fairleigh Dickinson)

The 1998 Northeast Conference men's basketball tournament was held in March. The tournament featured the league's top eight seeds. Fairleigh Dickinson won the championship, their third, and received the conference's automatic bid to the 1998 NCAA Tournament.

1997–98 Northeast Conference men's basketball standings
	Conf.				Overall
Team	W		L	PCT	W		L	PCT
Long Island	14	–	2	.875	21	–	11	.656
Fairleigh Dickinson †	13	–	3	.813	23	–	7	.767
St. Francis (NY)	10	–	6	.625	15	–	12	.556
Saint Francis (PA)	10	–	6	.625	17	–	10	.630
Mount St. Mary's	8	–	8	.500	13	–	15	.464
Wagner	7	–	9	.438	13	–	16	.448
Robert Morris	4	–	12	.250	8	–	19	.296
Monmouth	3	–	13	.188	4	–	23	.148
Central Connecticut	3	–	13	.188	4	–	22	.154
† 1998 NEC tournament winner Rankings from AP Poll

== Format ==
The NEC Men’s Basketball Tournament consisted of an eight-team playoff format with all games played at the Spiro Sports Center in Staten Island, NY.

== Bracket ==
Quarterfinals
1	Long Island	108
8	Monmouth	79
4	Saint Francis (PA)	50
5	Mount St. Mary's	69
2	Fairleigh Dickinson	89
7	Robert Morris	73
3	St. Francis Brooklyn	76^{OT}
6	Wagner	77

Semifinals
1	Long Island	93
5	Mount St. Mary's	73
2	Fairleigh Dickinson	78
6	Wagner	49

Championship Game
1	Long Island	91
2	Fairleigh Dickinson	105

== All-tournament team ==
Tournament MVP in bold.

**1998 NEC All-Tournament Team**

**Rahshon Turner**, FDU
Elijah Allen, FDU
Mike Campbell, LIU
Gregory Harris, MSM
Charles Jones, LIU
Richie Parker, LIU
