= Tim Welsh =

American basketball coach (born 1960)

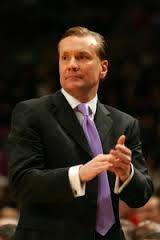

Biographical details
- Born: October 4, 1960 (age 66); Massena, New York, U.S.

Playing career
- 1980–1984: SUNY Potsdam

Coaching career (HC unless noted)
- 1985–1986: Iona (assistant)
- 1986–1988: Florida State (assistant)
- 1988–1991: Syracuse (assistant)
- 1991–1995: Iona (assistant)
- 1995–1998: Iona
- 1998–2008: Providence

Head coaching record
- Overall: 215–148
- Tournaments: 0–3 (NCAA Division I); 2–5 (NIT)

Accomplishments and honors

Championships
- 3 MAAC regular season (1996–1998); MAAC tournament (1998)

Awards
- 2× MAAC Coach of the Year (1997, 1998)

Tim Welsh (born October 4, 1960) is an American college basketball coach and the former head basketball coach at Providence College. Previously, he served as the head coach at Iona College. He also served briefly as head men's basketball coach at Hofstra University. He now serves as an analyst for ESPN.

== Background ==
Born in Massena, New York, Welsh is a 1984 graduate of SUNY Potsdam, where he played basketball for his father, Jerry. In his sophomore season, the Bears won the Division III National Championship. During his senior season, he was a co-captain. He also attended a year at Worcester Academy. Following his college career, he became a volunteer assistant under Pat Kennedy at Iona College, before becoming a full-time assistant under Kennedy at Florida State University. He later served as an assistant under Jim Boeheim at Syracuse University before joining his father, then the coach at Iona, as an assistant coach in 1991.

During the 1994–95 season, Jerry Welsh became ill and Tim served as the interim coach during his absence, guiding the Gaels to a 5–5 record in ten games. Following the season, Jerry was forced to retire and Tim was named the head coach on a permanent basis. In his first full season as head coach, the Gaels tied for the Metro Atlantic Athletic Conference regular-season title; in his second and third seasons, the Gaels won the title outright. Iona reached the 1998 NCAA tournament with a 27–6 record. This was Iona's first tournament appearance since 1985. Overall, Welsh went 70–22 in three seasons at Iona, and he was named MAAC Coach of the Year in both 1997 and 1998.

On November 16, 2008, Welsh made his debut on ESPNU serving as the color analyst for the Le Moyne vs Syracuse basketball game.

On April 1, 2010, Welsh was introduced as the new head coach at Hofstra University.

== Career at Providence ==
On April 2, 1998, Welsh was named the head coach at Providence College, the thirteenth head basketball coach in school history.

Under Welsh, Providence has made five postseason appearances, reaching the NCAA Tournament in 2001 and 2004 and the NIT in 1999, 2003, and 2007. However, Welsh did not have the success in Providence that he had at Iona. In his ten seasons as head coach of Providence, Welsh did not win an NCAA Tournament game and only won one Big East tournament game. During the 2007–2008 season, Welsh was under heavy pressure from fans and the Providence College administration. Most thought that he would be terminated if the Friars were unsuccessful in the post season.. On March 15, 2008, Tim Welsh was fired as head coach of the Providence Friars, due to the inconsistent performance over ten years and the failure to lead the Friars to post-season success.

== Career at Hofstra ==
On April 30, 2010, one month after he had been hired as the new head coach at Hofstra University, Welsh resigned from Hofstra before ever coaching a game.

== College basketball analyst ==
Welsh joined ESPN in November 2008 as a college basketball analyst. Welsh is also a game and studio analyst for SportsNet New York and Comcast SportsNet New England.

== Head coaching record ==
Record table
Season	Team	Overall	Conference	Standing	Postseason
Iona Gaels (Metro Atlantic Athletic Conference) (1995–1998)
1995–96	Iona	21–8	10–4	T–1st	NIT First Round
1996–97	Iona	22–8	11–3	1st	NIT First Round
1997–98	Iona	27–6	15–3	1st	NCAA Division I First Round
Iona:		70–22 (.761)	36–10 (.783)		
Providence Friars (Big East Conference) (1998–2008)
1998–99	Providence	16–14	9–9	T–6th	NIT First Round
1999–00	Providence	11–19	4–12	12th	
2000–01	Providence	21–10	11–5	2nd (East)	NCAA Division I First Round
2001–02	Providence	15–16	6–10	6th (East)	
2002–03	Providence	18–14	8–8	3rd (East)	NIT Second Round
2003–04	Providence	20–9	11–5	3rd	NCAA Division I First Round
2004–05	Providence	14–17	4–12	9th	
2005–06	Providence	12–15	5–11	T–13th	
2006–07	Providence	18–12	8–8	10th	NIT First Round
2007–08	Providence	15–16	6–12	T–12th	
Providence:		145–126 (.535)	72–92 (.439)		
Total:		215–148 (.592)			
National champion Postseason invitational champion Conference regular season champion Conference regular season and conference tournament champion Division regular season champion Division regular season and conference tournament champion Conference tournament champion
