= 1997–98 Iona Gaels men's basketball team =

American college basketball season

1997–98 Iona Gaels men's basketball
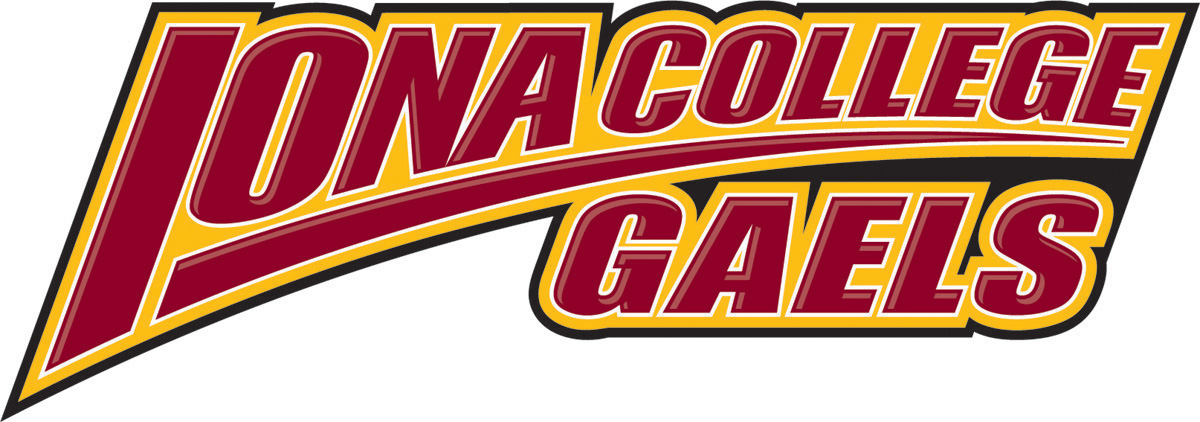

MAAC regular season champions MAAC tournament champions

NCAA tournament, First Round
- Conference: Metro Atlantic Athletic Conference
- Record: 27–6 (15–3 MAAC)
- Head coach: Tim Welsh (3rd season)
- Assistant coach: Jeff Ruland
- Home arena: John A. Mulcahy Campus Events Center

1997–98 MAAC men's basketball standings
	Conf.				Overall
Team	W		L	PCT	W		L	PCT
Iona †	15	–	3	.833	27	–	6	.818
Rider	12	–	6	.667	18	–	10	.643
Siena	10	–	8	.556	17	–	12	.586
Niagara	10	–	8	.556	14	–	13	.519
Loyola (MD)	9	–	9	.500	12	–	16	.429
Canisius	9	–	9	.500	13	–	14	.481
Manhattan	7	–	11	.389	12	–	17	.414
Marist	7	–	11	.389	11	–	17	.393
Fairfield	7	–	11	.389	12	–	15	.444
Saint Peter's	4	–	14	.222	8	–	19	.296
† 1998 MAAC tournament winner Rankings from AP Poll

The 1997–98 Iona Gaels men's basketball team represented Iona College during the 1997–98 NCAA Division I men's basketball season. The Gaels, led second-year by head coach Tim Welsh, played their home games at the John A. Mulcahy Campus Events Center and were members of the Metro Atlantic Athletic Conference. The Gaels finished second in the MAAC regular season standings, and would go on to win the MAAC Basketball tournament to receive an automatic bid to the 1998 NCAA tournament – the program's first appearance in the "Big Dance" since 1985. As the No. 12 seed in the Southeast region, the Gaels lost to No. 5 seed Syracuse in the opening round.

== Roster ==
1997–98 Iona Gaels men's basketball team
Players
Coaches

Pos.	#	Name	Height	Weight	Year	Hometown
G	00	John McDonald	6 ft 0 in (1.83 m)	185 lb (84 kg)	Sr	Mount Vernon, New York
C	20	Kashif Hameed	6 ft 8 in (2.03 m)	220 lb (100 kg)	Jr	New York City, New York
G/F	21	Tariq Kirksay	6 ft 6 in (1.98 m)	205 lb (93 kg)	So	Bronx, New York

Head coach

- Tim Welsh

Assistant coach(es)

Legend

- (C) Team captain
- (S) Suspended
- (I) Ineligible
- (W) Walk-on
- Injured
- Current redshirt

Roster

== Schedule and results ==
Date time, TV	Rank^{#}	Opponent^{#}	Result	Record	Site (attendance) city, state
Regular season
Nov 15, 1997*		at Morgan State	W 95–92 ^{OT}	1–0	Talmadge L. Hill Field House (1,110); Baltimore, Maryland
Nov 21, 1997*		vs. No. 5 Clemson; Top of the World Classic	L 49–79	1–1	Carlson Center (2,839); Fairbanks, Alaska
Nov 22, 1997*		vs. Duquesne; Top of the World Classic	L 62–64	1–2	Carlson Center (2,234); Fairbanks, Alaska
Nov 23, 1997*		at Alaska-Fairbanks; Top of the World Classic	W 85–68	2–2	Carlson Center (2,536); Fairbanks, Alaska
Nov 29, 1997*		at Rutgers	W 70–62	3–2	Louis Brown Athletic Center (5,215); Piscataway, New Jersey
Dec 3, 1997		Saint Peter's	W 90–72	4–2 (1–0)	John A. Mulcahy Campus Events Center (2,510); New Rochelle, New York
Dec 5, 1997		at Manhattan	L 62–64 ^{OT}	4–3 (1–1)	Draddy Gymnasium (1,373); New York, New York
Dec 10, 1997*		Hofstra	W 78–63	5–3	John A. Mulcahy Campus Events Center (1,487); New Rochelle, New York
Dec 14, 1997*		Fordham	W 80–65	6–3	John A. Mulcahy Campus Events Center (2,440); New Rochelle, New York
Dec 20, 1997*		Liberty	W 84–68	7–3	John A. Mulcahy Campus Events Center (1,243); New Rochelle, New York
Dec 28, 1997*		Wagner	W 92–52	8–3	John A. Mulcahy Campus Events Center (1,270); New Rochelle, New York
Jan 3, 1998		Fairfield	W 90–68	9–3 (2–1)	John A. Mulcahy Campus Events Center (2,710); New Rochelle, New York
Jan 5, 1998*		at Providence	W 68–62	10–3	Providence Civic Center (8,615); Providence, Rhode Island
Jan 8, 1998		at Rider	W 90–65	11–3 (3–1)	Alumni Gymnasium (1,508); Lawrenceville, New Jersey
Jan 10, 1998		at Saint Peter's	W 80–60	12–3 (4–1)	Yanitelli Center (1,086); Jersey City, New Jersey
Jan 13, 1998		Manhattan	W 75–72	13–3 (5–1)	John A. Mulcahy Campus Events Center (2,521); New Rochelle, New York
Jan 17, 1998		vs. Niagara	W 81–67	14–3 (6–1)	Marine Midland Arena (1,021); Buffalo, New York
Jan 19, 1998		at Canisius	W 74–65	15–3 (7–1)	Marine Midland Arena (4,903); Buffalo, New York
Jan 24, 1998		at Marist	W 87–72	16–3 (8–1)	McCann Arena (2,905); Poughkeepsie, New York
Jan 27, 1998*		at St. Francis (NY)	W 100–69	17–3	Generoso Pope Athletic Complex (436); Brooklyn, New York
Jan 29, 1998		Rider	W 69–63	18–3 (9–1)	John A. Mulcahy Campus Events Center (3,079); New Rochelle, New York
Feb 1, 1998		Siena	W 83–82	19–3 (10–1)	John A. Mulcahy Campus Events Center (3,128); New Rochelle, New York
Feb 4, 1998		at Loyola (MD)	L 82–91	19–4 (10–2)	Reitz Arena (2,025); Baltimore, Maryland
Feb 6, 1998		Niagara	W 86–74	20–4 (11–2)	John A. Mulcahy Campus Events Center (2,870); New Rochelle, New York
Feb 9, 1998		Canisius	W 102–66	21–4 (12–2)	John A. Mulcahy Campus Events Center (2,710); New Rochelle, New York
Feb 11, 1998		at Siena	L 92–104	21–5 (12–3)	Pepsi Arena (5,789); Albany, New York
Feb 14, 1998		at Fairfield	W 78–68	22–5 (13–3)	Alumni Hall (2,424); Fairfield, Connecticut
Feb 19, 1998		Marist	W 80–65	23–5 (14–3)	John A. Mulcahy Campus Events Center (2,908); New Rochelle, New York
Feb 22, 1998		Loyola (MD)	W 92–82	24–5 (15–3)	John A. Mulcahy Campus Events Center (3,142); New Rochelle, New York
MAAC tournament
Feb 28, 1998*	(1)	vs. (8) Marist; Quarterfinals	W 76–55	25–5	Pepsi Arena (3,611); Albany, New York
Mar 1, 1998*	(1)	vs. (5) Loyola (MD); Semifinals	W 69–58	26–5	Pepsi Arena (3,142); Albany, New York
Mar 2, 1998*	(1)	at (3) Siena; Championship game	W 90–75	27–5	Pepsi Arena (10,667); Albany, New York
NCAA tournament
Mar 13, 1998*	(12 S)	vs. (5 S) No. 21 Syracuse; First round	L 61–63	27–6	Rupp Arena (15,622); Lexington, Kentucky
*Non-conference game. ^{#}Rankings from AP Poll. (#) Tournament seedings in parentheses. SE=Southeast. All times are in Eastern Time.

== Awards and honors ==
- Kashif Hameed – MAAC Player of the Year
