= James Felton =

American basketball player

Personal information
- Born: c. 1980
- Died: October 21, 2006 (aged 26) Jersey City, New Jersey, U.S.
- Listed height: 6 ft 10 in (2.08 m)
- Listed weight: 260 lb (118 kg)

Career information
- High school: Dickinson (Jersey City, New Jersey); Marist (Bayonne, New Jersey)
- College: St. John's (1997); Fairleigh Dickinson (2000–2002)
- NBA draft: 2002: undrafted
- Playing career: 2002–2005
- Position: Center

James Daniel Felton (c. 1980 – October 21, 2006) was an American basketball player. A highly touted prospect in high school, Felton gained notoriety when he was dunked on by a then-unknown Tracy McGrady at an ABCD Camp in 1996 which propelled McGrady to national prominence. He began his college basketball career with the St. John's Red Storm in 1997 but was dismissed after six games for violating team policy. Felton spent time at three other colleges without playing basketball until he joined the Fairleigh Dickinson Knights in 2000 and spent two seasons with the team. He played for three seasons in the American Basketball Association until his retirement in 2005. Felton struggled with alcoholism throughout his life which caused poor health and eventually led to his death at the age of 26.

== Early life ==
Felton was the oldest of two sons and raised by his mother, Cheryll, in Jersey City, New Jersey. His father, Edwin Jeffers, lived in South Carolina. His mother struggled with complications from diabetes. When he was aged 10, Felton was diagnosed as emotionally disturbed by school counselors. Felton played basketball in Audubon Park, New Jersey, as a teenager against players including Roshown McLeod and Rodrick Rhodes.

Felton began his high school basketball career at Dickinson High School. He transferred to Marist High School which caused Dickinson head coach Bill "Red" Drennan to unsuccessfully protest to the New Jersey State Interscholastic Athletic Association that Felton was recruited by Marist. Marist assistant basketball coach, Kenny Pignatello, acted as Felton's surrogate father by taking him to games and paying his family's electricity bill. Marist won two county championships during Felton's tenure. He averaged 13 points, 10.2 rebounds and 4 blocks per game during the 1995–96 season. Felton was suspended for seven games during his senior season.

=== ABCD Camp dunk ===
Felton was invited to the ABCD Camp in 1996 as a top-25 prospect. In the week-ending all-star game, Felton chased down a then-unknown Tracy McGrady who had an open run to the hoop. McGrady waited for Felton to catch up and then performed a windmill dunk on him. Dozens of fans and players ran onto the court in celebration which meant that the game had to be temporarily halted.

In a 2008 interview, McGrady said that the dunk "put [him] on the map." He was the standout performer of the camp and his dunk on Felton was the highlight moment which brought him to national prominence. Fellow camp attendee Lamar Odom called the dunk "one of the best basketball moments of [his] life" and claimed that he had "never seen anyone do something like that, not even in the NBA." Pignatello believed that Felton became lifeless after being humiliated at the camp and "his game went in the tank." Felton's close friend Shaun Coleman claimed that Felton was continually getting teased about the dunk. Coleman said, "Everywhere we'd go: 'There's the guy McGrady dunked on!' It was all he heard."

=== College recruitment ===
Felton received hundreds of scholarship offers from colleges. He was recruited by the reigning national champion Kentucky Wildcats; Felton fell asleep during a meeting with an academic counselor and he was sent home by head coach Rick Pitino. On November 11, 1996, Felton committed to play college basketball for the St. John's Red Storm under head coach Fran Fraschilla.

== College career ==
=== St. John's Red Storm (1997) ===
At one of Felton's first preseason practices with the St. John's Red Storm, 12 scouts from the National Basketball Association (NBA) were in attendance; head coach Fran Fraschilla said that Felton was the only player scouts asked about. His teammate, Ron Artest, believed that Felton "was going to the NBA before any of us." Felton earned the team's sixth man role to start the season but he bickered with his team and was frequently intoxicated. He averaged 2.2 points and 3.3 rebounds in six appearances to start the season but was then suspended for disciplinary reasons for two games. On December 16, 1997, Fraschilla announced that Felton had been dismissed by the Red Storm for repeated violations of undisclosed team policy and his scholarship was revoked.

=== Transfers (1998–1999) ===
On January 9, 1998, Felton enrolled at Florida State University but would not be eligible to play for the Seminoles until after the 1998 fall semester. He would have joined the team as a walk-on and was promised a scholarship by head coach Steve Robinson if he met university academic requirements. Felton felt homesick and rarely attended class. On April 21, Felton left the Florida State campus without appearing in a game for the Seminoles.

Felton enrolled at Essex County College in 1998. He enrolled at Saint Peter's College (now Saint Peter's University) in January 1999 but was dismissed in August because of his poor academic standing. Saint Peter's head coach Rodger Blind had wanted Felton to seek counseling for his alcohol abuse but "he didn't fulfill that responsibility."

=== Fairleigh Dickinson Knights (2000–2002) ===
In 2000, Felton signed to play for the Fairleigh Dickinson Knights after head coach Tom Green had read a newspaper article about him. He joined the team as a sophomore academically but had only two years of eligibility because of the NCAA's "five-year clock" which began in 1997. Felton's debut with the Knights was delayed because of a broken right foot and he did not make his first appearance until February 2001. He played in the final seven games of the season and averaged 13.2 points per game. Felton was suspended by Green for the first month of the 2001–02 season for violating an unspecific athletic department policy. He scored a career-high 41 points against the LIU Brooklyn Blackbirds in the final game of his collegiate career.

== Professional career ==
One month after his college career ended, Felton was invited by Joe Bryant to a basketball bootcamp. He performed in conditioning drills and was taught fundamentals including post moves with Adrian Dantley. Bryant landed Felton a successful tryout with the Harlem Globetrotters but he struggled with intoxication and was convinced by the Globetrotters to attend rehab. He returned one month later but was out of shape and released within weeks.

Felton played for three years in the American Basketball Association (ABA). Bryant helped Felton to receive a tryout with the Denver Nuggets in 2003. Felton's playing career ended in 2005.

== Personal life ==
Felton married his high school sweetheart, Rana Brookins-Felton, in 1999 and they had three children. Rana claimed that Felton did not like playing basketball and never watched it. She said that Felton "lived in denial about basketball. Every day, he'd pretend it was something he liked. It ate him alive." Rana believed that the criticism Felton received about how his playing career eventuated fueled his drinking problem.

After his playing career ended, Felton returned to New Jersey where he worked in security for Comcast. He had liver damage and diabetic neuropathy in his feet which caused him constant pain. Felton's poor health meant that he had to quit working and would drink himself to sleep.

=== Death ===
On October 21, 2006, Felton was found dead in his Jersey City apartment. He was aged 26. Felton's cause of death was listed as natural causes. Police claimed that Felton did not always take the five medications he had been prescribed for his medical conditions and drank excessive amounts of alcohol.
