= 1997–98 Connecticut Huskies men's basketball team =

American college basketball season

1997–98 Connecticut Huskies men's basketball

Big East 6 Division Regular Season Champions Big East tournament champions

NCAA men's Division I tournament, Elite Eight
- Conference: Big East Conference

Ranking
- Coaches: No. 7
- AP: No. 6
- Record: 32–5 (15–3 Big East)
- Head coach: Jim Calhoun (12th season)
- Assistant coaches: Karl Hobbs; Dave Leitao; Tom Moore
- Home arena: Hartford Civic Center; Harry A. Gampel Pavilion

1997–98 Big East men's basketball standings
	Conf.				Overall
Team	W		L	PCT	W		L	PCT
Big East 6
No. 6 Connecticut†	15	–	3	.833	32	–	5	.865
St. John's	13	–	5	.722	22	–	10	.688
West Virginia	11	–	7	.611	24	–	9	.727
Villanova	8	–	10	.444	12	–	17	.414
Notre Dame	7	–	11	.389	13	–	14	.481
Boston College	6	–	12	.333	15	–	16	.484
Big East 7
No. 21 Syracuse	12	–	6	.667	26	–	9	.743
Miami	11	–	7	.611	18	–	10	.643
Seton Hall	9	–	9	.500	15	–	15	.500
Providence	7	–	11	.389	13	–	16	.448
Pittsburgh	6	–	12	.333	11	–	16	.407
Rutgers	6	–	12	.333	14	–	15	.483
Georgetown	6	–	12	.333	16	–	15	.516
† 1998 Big East tournament winner As of March 30, 1998; Rankings from AP poll

The 1997–98 Connecticut Huskies men's basketball team represented the University of Connecticut in the 1997–98 collegiate men's basketball season. The Huskies completed the season with a 32–5 overall record. The Huskies were members of the Big East Conference where they finished with a 15–3 record. UConn advanced to the Elite Eight in the 1998 NCAA Division I men's basketball tournament before losing to North Carolina 75–64.

The Huskies played their home games at Harry A. Gampel Pavilion in Storrs, Connecticut and the Hartford Civic Center in Hartford, Connecticut, and they were led by twelfth-year head coach Jim Calhoun.

== Roster ==
Listed are the student athletes who were members of the 1997–1998 team.

Name	Position	Year
Chris Crowley		FR
Jeff Cybart	G	SR
Khalid El-Amin	G	FR
Kevin Freeman	F	SO
Sam Funches	F	SO
Craig Glazer	G	FR
Richard Hamilton	F	SO
Monquencio Hardnett	G	SR
E.J. Harrison	G	JR
Rashamel Jones	F	JR
Antric Klaiber	F	JR
Ricky Moore	G	JR
Albert Mouring	G	FR
Jake Voskuhl	C	SO
Souleymane Wane	C	SO

== Schedule ==
Date time, TV	Rank^{#}	Opponent^{#}	Result	Record	Site (attendance) city, state
Regular Season
11/15/1997*; WTNH	No. 12	Yale	W 88–57	1–0	Hartford Civic Center (13,391); Hartford, Connecticut
11/17/1997*	No. 12	Boston University; Preseason NIT	W 68–54	2–0	Harry A. Gampel Pavilion (9,311); Storrs, Connecticut
11/19/1997*; ESPN	No. 12	No. 20 Rhode Island; Preseason NIT	W 80–67	3–0	Harry A. Gampel Pavilion (9,592); Storrs, Connecticut
11/24/1997*; WTNH	No. 12	Coppin State	W 72–50	4–0	Hartford Civic Center (13,212); Hartford, Connecticut
11/26/1997*; ESPN	No. 11	vs. No. 25 Florida State; Preseason NIT	L 60–67	4–1	Madison Square Garden (11,510); New York City
11/28/1997*; ESPN	No. 11	vs. Arizona State; Preseason NIT	W 82–61	5–1	Madison Square Garden (12,254); New York
12/3/1997; WTNH	No. 12	West Virginia	W 88–75	6–1 (1–0)	Harry A. Gampel Pavilion (9,621); Storrs, Connecticut
12/7/1997; WTNH	No. 12	at Rutgers	W 59–44	7–1 (2–0)	Louis Brown Athletic Center (6,112); Piscataway, New Jersey
12/10/1997*; WTNH	No. 13	at Virginia	W 74–63	8–1	University Hall (6,841); Charlottesville, Virginia
12/20/1997*; WTNH	No. 12	UNC Wilmington	W 93–55	9–1	Hartford Civic Center (13,911); Hartford, Connecticut
12/23/1997*; ESPN	No. 11	Massachusetts; MassMutual UGame	W 72–55	10–1	Hartford Civic Center (10,797); Hartford, Connecticut
12/28/1997*; WTNH	No. 11	Hartford	W 100–69	11–1	Hartford Civic Center (14,505); Hartford, Connecticut
12/30/1997*; WTNH	No. 10	Fairfield	W 90–63	12–1	Hartford Civic Center (14,313); Hartford, Connecticut
1/3/1998; WTNH	No. 10	Notre Dame	W 84–58	13–1 (3–0)	Hartford Civic Center (15,101); Hartford, Connecticut
1/6/1998; WTNH	No. 10	at Miami	L 67–76	13–2 (3–1)	Miami Arena (8,247); Miami, Florida
1/11/1998; WTNH	No. 8	at Boston College	W 80–68	14–2 (4–1)	Conte Forum (7,976); Boston
1/13/1998; WTNH	No. 10	Seton Hall	W 80–59	15–2 (5–1)	Hartford Civic Center (14,756); Hartford, Connecticut
1/17/1998; CBS	No. 10	Georgetown; Rivalry	W 86–72	16–2 (6–1)	Hartford Civic Center (16,294); Hartford, Connecticut
1/19/1998; ESPN	No. 10	at St. John's	L 62–64	16–3 (6–2)	Madison Square Garden (11,768); New York
1/24/1998; CBS	No. 8	at No. 15 Syracuse; Rivalry	W 63–54	17–3 (7–2)	Carrier Dome (25,718); Syracuse, New York
1/27/1998; ESPN2	No. 9	at Providence	W 63–56	18–3 (8–2)	Providence Civic Center (12,978); Providence, Rhode Island
1/31/1998; WTNH	No. 9	Rutgers	W 73–56	19–3 (9–2)	Harry A. Gampel Pavilion (10,027); Storrs, Connecticut
2/2/1998; ESPN	No. 9	Villanova	W 80–65	20–3 (10–2)	Hartford Civic Center (15,439); Hartford, Connecticut
2/7/1998*; CBS	No. 7	Stanford	W 76–56	21–3	Harry A. Gampel Pavilion (10,027); Storrs, Connecticut
2/11/1998; ESPN	No. 6	at No. 16 West Virginia	L 62–80	21–4 (10–3)	WVU Coliseum (15,167); Morgantown, West Virginia
2/14/1998; WTNH	No. 6	Pittsburgh	W 92–67	22–4 (11–3)	Hartford Civic Center (15,467); Hartford, Connecticut
2/17/1998; ESPN2	No. 7	at Notre Dame	W 88–79	23–4 (12–3)	Edmund P. Joyce Center (10,273); Notre Dame, Indiana
2/21/1998; WTNH	No. 7	at Villanova	W 83–73	24–4 (13–3)	CoreStates Center (12,934); Philadelphia
2/23/1998; ESPN	No. 7	Providence	W 77–68	25–4 (14–3)	Hartford Civic Center (16,129); Hartford, Connecticut
2/28/1998; WTNH	No. 6	St. John's	W 87–58	26–4 (15–3)	Harry A. Gampel Pavilion (10,027); Storrs, Connecticut
Big East tournament
3/5/1998; ESPN	No. 6	vs. Providence; Quarterfinals	W 64–55	27–4	Madison Square Garden (15,377); New York
3/6/1998; ESPN	No. 6	vs. Rutgers; Semifinals	W 64–50	28–4	Madison Square Garden (19,548); New York
3/7/1998; ESPN	No. 6	vs. No. 22 Syracuse; Championship/Rivalry	W 69–54	29–4	Madison Square Garden (18,521); New York
NCAA tournament
3/12/1998*; CBS	No. 6 (2)	vs. No. (15) Fairleigh Dickinson; First Round	W 93–85	30–4	MCI Center (19,288); Washington, D.C.
3/14/1998*; CBS	No. 6 (2)	vs. No. (7) Indiana; Second Round	W 78–68	31–4	MCI Center (19,320); Washington, D.C.
3/19/1998*; CBS	No. 6 (2)	vs. No. (11) Washington; Sweet Sixteen	W 75–74	32–4	Greensboro Coliseum Complex (23,235); Greensboro, North Carolina
3/21/1998*; CBS	No. 6 (2)	vs. No. 1 (1) North Carolina; Elite Eight	L 64–75	32–5	Greensboro Coliseum Complex (23,235); Greensboro, North Carolina
*Non-conference game. ^{#}Rankings from AP Poll. (#) Tournament seedings in parentheses. All times are in Eastern Time.

Schedule Source:

== Rankings ==
Legend: ██ Increase in ranking. ██ Decrease in ranking.
Poll	Pre	Wk 2	Wk 3	Wk 4	Wk 5	Wk 6	Wk 7	Wk 8	Wk 9	Wk 10	Wk 11	Wk 12	Wk 13	Wk 14	Wk 15	Wk 16	Wk 17	Wk 18	Final
AP	12	12	11	13	13	12	11	10	8	10	8	9	7	6	7	6	6	6	N/A
