= 1997–98 Notre Dame Fighting Irish men's basketball team =

American college basketball season

1997–98 Notre Dame Fighting Irish men's basketball
- Conference: Big East Conference
- Record: 13-14 (7-11 Big East Conference)
- Head coach: John MacLeod (7th season)
- Home arena: Joyce Center

1997–98 Big East men's basketball standings
	Conf.				Overall
Team	W		L	PCT	W		L	PCT
Big East 6
No. 6 Connecticut†	15	–	3	.833	32	–	5	.865
St. John's	13	–	5	.722	22	–	10	.688
West Virginia	11	–	7	.611	24	–	9	.727
Villanova	8	–	10	.444	12	–	17	.414
Notre Dame	7	–	11	.389	13	–	14	.481
Boston College	6	–	12	.333	15	–	16	.484
Big East 7
No. 21 Syracuse	12	–	6	.667	26	–	9	.743
Miami	11	–	7	.611	18	–	10	.643
Seton Hall	9	–	9	.500	15	–	15	.500
Providence	7	–	11	.389	13	–	16	.448
Pittsburgh	6	–	12	.333	11	–	16	.407
Rutgers	6	–	12	.333	14	–	15	.483
Georgetown	6	–	12	.333	16	–	15	.516
† 1998 Big East tournament winner As of March 30, 1998; Rankings from AP poll

The 1997–98 Notre Dame Fighting Irish Men's Basketball Team represented the University of Notre Dame in the 1997–98 NCAA Division I men's basketball season.

== Schedule ==
Date time, TV	Rank^{#}	Opponent^{#}	Result	Record	Site city, state
November 17*		The Citadel	W 72–53	1–0	Joyce Center; South Bend, IN
November 21*		at Marquette	L 48–72	1–1	Bradley Center; Milwaukee, WI
November 25*		Northeastern	W 72–45	2–1	Joyce Center; South Bend, IN
November 28*		Sam Houston State	W 88–69	3–1	Joyce Center; South Bend, IN
December 3*		at Indiana	L 80–91	3–2	Assembly Hall; Bloomington, IN
December 6		at Pittsburgh	W 73–69	4–2 (1–0)	Fitzgerald Field House; Pittsburgh, Pennsylvania
December 14*		Drexel	W 78–70	5–2 (1–0)	Joyce Center (9,175); South Bend, IN
December 20*		Florida International	W 99–85	6–2 (1–0)	Joyce Center; South Bend, IN
December 22*		Dartmouth	W 75–50	7–2 (1–0)	Joyce Center; South Bend, IN
December 30		St. John's	L 69–79	7–3 (1–1)	Joyce Center; South Bend, IN
January 3		at No. 10 Connecticut	L 58–84	7–4 (1–2)	Harry A. Gampel Pavilion (15,101); Storrs, Connecticut
January 6		Pittsburgh	L 61–72	7–5 (1–3)	Joyce Center; South Bend, IN
January 11		Rutgers	W 91–76	8–5 (2–3)	Joyce Center; South Bend, IN
January 15		at No. 21 West Virginia	W 74–72	9–5 (3–3)	WVU Coliseum; Morgantown, West Virginia
January 17		at Seton Hall	L 58–64	9–6 (3–4)	Continental Airlines Arena; East Rutherford, NJ
January 21		No. 15 Syracuse	W 83–63	10–6 (4–4)	Joyce Center; South Bend, IN
January 28		Villanova	L 61–81	10–7 (4–5)	Joyce Center; South Bend, IN
January 31		at St. John's	W 73–65	11–7 (5–5)	Madison Square Garden; New York, New York
February 5		at Rutgers	L 61–71	11–8 (5–6)	Louis Brown Athletic Center; Piscataway, NJ
February 7		at Georgetown	L 56–76	11–9 (5–7)	MCI Center (16,609); Washington, D.C.
February 11		Boston College	W 75–72	12–9 (6–7)	Joyce Center; South Bend, IN
February 14		at Miami (FL)	L 57–66	12–10 (6–8)	Miami Arena (4,425); Miami, Florida
February 17		No. 7 Connecticut	L 79–88	12–11 (6–9)	Joyce Center; South Bend, IN
February 22		Miami (FL)	L 59–65	12–12 (6–10)	Joyce Center; South Bend, IN
February 25		Georgetown	W 76–69	13–12 (7–10)	Joyce Center; South Bend, IN
February 28		at Providence	L 62–77	13–13 (7–11)	Providence Civic Center; Providence, RI
Big East tournament
March 4	(9)	vs. (8) Providence; First round	L 55–72	13–14 (7–11)	Madison Square Garden; New York, NY
*Non-conference game. ^{#}Rankings from AP Poll. (#) Tournament seedings in parentheses. All times are in Eastern Time.
