= 1997–98 West Virginia Mountaineers men's basketball team =

American college basketball season

1997–98 West Virginia Mountaineers men's basketball

NCAA tournament, Sweet Sixteen
- Conference: Big East Conference

Ranking
- Coaches: No. 18
- Record: 24–9 (11–7 Big East)
- Head coach: Gale Catlett (20th season)
- Home arena: WVU Coliseum

1997–98 Big East men's basketball standings
	Conf.				Overall
Team	W		L	PCT	W		L	PCT
Big East 6
No. 6 Connecticut†	15	–	3	.833	32	–	5	.865
St. John's	13	–	5	.722	22	–	10	.688
West Virginia	11	–	7	.611	24	–	9	.727
Villanova	8	–	10	.444	12	–	17	.414
Notre Dame	7	–	11	.389	13	–	14	.481
Boston College	6	–	12	.333	15	–	16	.484
Big East 7
No. 21 Syracuse	12	–	6	.667	26	–	9	.743
Miami	11	–	7	.611	18	–	10	.643
Seton Hall	9	–	9	.500	15	–	15	.500
Providence	7	–	11	.389	13	–	16	.448
Pittsburgh	6	–	12	.333	11	–	16	.407
Rutgers	6	–	12	.333	14	–	15	.483
Georgetown	6	–	12	.333	16	–	15	.516
† 1998 Big East tournament winner As of March 30, 1998; Rankings from AP poll

The 1997–98 West Virginia Mountaineers men's basketball team represented West Virginia University as a member of the Big East Conference during the 1997-98 season. The team played their home games at WVU Coliseum in Morgantown, West Virginia. Led by 20th-year head coach Gale Catlett, the Mountaineers received an at-large bid to the 1998 NCAA tournament as the No. 10 seed in the West region. West Virginia advanced to the Sweet Sixteen and finished with an overall record of 24–9 (11–7 Big East).

== Roster ==
1997–98 West Virginia Mountaineers men's basketball team
Players	Coaches
Pos. / # / Name / Height / Weight / Year / Hometown; F / 24 / Damian Owens / 6 ft 6 in (1.98 m) / 215 lb (98 kg) / Sr / Seat Pleasant, Maryland	Head coach: Gale Catlett; Assistant coach(es) Legend: (C) Team captain; (S) Suspended; (I) Ineligible; (W) Walk-on; Injured; Current redshirt

== Schedule and results ==
Date time, TV	Rank^{#}	Opponent^{#}	Result	Record	Site city, state
Regular season
Nov 15, 1997*		East Carolina	W 87–66	1–0	WVU Coliseum; Morgantown, West Virginia
Nov 22, 1997		Alabama A&M	W 114–85	2–0	WVU Coliseum; Morgantown, West Virginia
Nov 28, 1997		at Puerto Rico-Mayagüez	W 111–63	3–0	Caguas Municipal Complex (106); San Juan, Puerto Rico
Nov 29, 1997*		vs. Rice	W 78–61	4–0	Caguas Municipal Complex; San Juan, Puerto Rico
Nov 30, 1997*		vs. Dayton	W 96–74	5–0	Caguas Municipal Complex; San Juan, Puerto Rico
Dec 3, 1997		at No. 13 Connecticut	L 75–88	5–1 (0–1)	Harry A. Gampel Pavilion; Storrs, Connecticut
Dec 6, 1997		St. John's	W 86–70	6–1 (1–1)	WVU Coliseum; Morgantown, West Virginia
Dec 13, 1997*		Ohio	W 89–63	7–1	WVU Coliseum; Morgantown, West Virginia
Dec 16, 1997*		Robert Morris	W 101–52	8–1	WVU Coliseum; Morgantown, West Virginia
Dec 20, 1997*		vs. No. 20 Georgia	W 86–81	9–1	Georgia Dome; Atlanta, Georgia
Dec 22, 1997*	No. 23	at Virginia Tech	W 55–52	10–1	Cassell Coliseum; Blacksburg, Virginia
Dec 27, 1997*	No. 23	Duquesne	W 90–78	11–1	WVU Coliseum; Morgantown, West Virginia
Dec 31, 1997	No. 22	at Georgetown	L 65–74	11–2 (1–2)	Verizon Center; Washington, D.C.
Jan 3, 1998*	No. 22	Boston College	W 79–57	12–2 (2–2)	WVU Coliseum; Morgantown, West Virginia
Jan 5, 1998	No. 25	Georgetown	W 81–70	13–2 (3–2)	WVU Coliseum; Morgantown, West Virginia
Jan 10, 1998	No. 25	Miami (FL)	W 98–84	14–2 (4–2)	WVU Coliseum; Morgantown, West Virginia
Jan 15, 1998	No. 21	Notre Dame	L 72–74	14–3 (4–3)	WVU Coliseum; Morgantown, West Virginia
Jan 18, 1998	No. 21	at Villanova	W 79–65 ^{OT}	15–3 (5–3)	The Pavilion; Philadelphia, Pennsylvania
Jan 20, 1998	No. 23	at Rutgers	W 80–72	16–3 (6–3)	Louis Brown Athletic Center; Piscataway, New Jersey
Jan 24, 1998	No. 23	Providence	W 81–63	17–3 (7–3)	WVU Coliseum; Morgantown, West Virginia
Jan 28, 1998	No. 17	vs. Pittsburgh	W 76–72	18–3 (8–3)	Civic Arena; Pittsburgh, Pennsylvania
Feb 3, 1998	No. 15	Pittsburgh	W 90–72	19–3 (9–3)	WVU Coliseum; Morgantown, West Virginia
Feb 7, 1998	No. 15	at St. John's	L 69–77	19–4 (9–4)	Carnesecca Arena; New York, New York
Feb 11, 1998	No. 16	No. 6 Connecticut	W 80–62	20–4 (10–4)	WVU Coliseum; Morgantown, West Virginia
Feb 14, 1998	No. 16	at No. 23 Syracuse	L 58–73	20–5 (10–5)	Carrier Dome; Syracuse, New York
Feb 16, 1998*	No. 20	vs. Marshall	W 71–58	21–5	Charleston Civic Center; Charleston, West Virginia
Feb 22, 1998	No. 20	Seton Hall	W 81–71	22–5 (11–5)	WVU Coliseum; Morgantown, West Virginia
Feb 25, 1998	No. 19	at Boston College	L 69–72	22–6 (11–6)	Silvio O. Conte Forum; Boston, Massachusetts
Feb 28, 1998	No. 19	at Miami (FL)	L 66–70	22–7 (11–7)	Miami Arena; Miami, Florida
Big East Tournament
Mar 4, 1998*	(5) No. 23	vs. (12) Rutgers; First round	L 65–72	22–8	Madison Square Garden; New York, New York
NCAA Tournament
Mar 12, 1998*	(10 W)	vs. (7 W) No. 24 Temple; First round	W 82–52	23–8	BSU Pavilion; Boise, Idaho
Mar 14, 1998*	(10 W)	vs. (2 W) No. 9 Cincinnati; Second Round	W 75–74	24–8	BSU Pavilion; Boise, Idaho
Mar 19, 1998*	(10 W)	vs. (3 W) No. 7 Utah; West Regional semifinal – Sweet Sixteen	L 62–65	24–9	Arrowhead Pond of Anaheim; Anaheim, California
*Non-conference game. ^{#}Rankings from AP Poll. (#) Tournament seedings in parentheses. W=West. All times are in Eastern.
