= 1997–98 Miami Hurricanes men's basketball team =

American college basketball season

1997–98 Miami Hurricanes men's basketball

NCAA tournament, first round
- Conference: Big East
- Big East 7
- Record: 18–10 (11–7 Big East)
- Head coach: Leonard Hamilton (8th season)
- Assistant coaches: Dwight Freeman; Stan Jones; Scott Howard
- Home arena: Miami Arena

1997–98 Big East men's basketball standings
	Conf.				Overall
Team	W		L	PCT	W		L	PCT
Big East 6
No. 6 Connecticut†	15	–	3	.833	32	–	5	.865
St. John's	13	–	5	.722	22	–	10	.688
West Virginia	11	–	7	.611	24	–	9	.727
Villanova	8	–	10	.444	12	–	17	.414
Notre Dame	7	–	11	.389	13	–	14	.481
Boston College	6	–	12	.333	15	–	16	.484
Big East 7
No. 21 Syracuse	12	–	6	.667	26	–	9	.743
Miami	11	–	7	.611	18	–	10	.643
Seton Hall	9	–	9	.500	15	–	15	.500
Providence	7	–	11	.389	13	–	16	.448
Pittsburgh	6	–	12	.333	11	–	16	.407
Rutgers	6	–	12	.333	14	–	15	.483
Georgetown	6	–	12	.333	16	–	15	.516
† 1998 Big East tournament winner As of March 30, 1998; Rankings from AP poll

The 1997–98 Miami Hurricanes men's basketball team represented the University of Miami during the 1997–98 NCAA Division I men's basketball season. The Hurricanes, led by eighth-year head coach Leonard Hamilton, played their home games at the Miami Arena and were members of the Big East Conference.

They finished the season 18–10, 11–7 in Big East play, to finish in second place in the Big East 7 division. They lost in the second round of the 1998 Big East men's basketball tournament to St. John's. They were invited to the 1998 NCAA Division I men's basketball tournament, where they fell in the opening round to UCLA. This was just the program's second overall appearance in the NCAA Tournament, and their first since 1960.

== Roster ==
1997–98 Miami Hurricanes men's basketball team
Players
Coaches

Pos.	#	Name	Height	Weight	Year	Hometown
G	3	Mike Byers-Dawson	5 ft 10 in (1.78 m)	205 lb (93 kg)	Fr	Fort Worth, TX
F	11	Jerry Schlie	6 ft 6 in (1.98 m)	200 lb (91 kg)	Fr	Holbrook, NY
G	14	Todd Manuel	6 ft 2 in (1.88 m)	180 lb (82 kg)	Fr	New Canaan, CT
F	15	Nick Donovan	7 ft 0 in (2.13 m)	253 lb (115 kg)	Jr	Coventry, England
G/F	30	Vernon Jennings	6 ft 4 in (1.93 m)	203 lb (92 kg)	So	College Park, GA
G/F	31	Johnny Hemsley	6 ft 5 in (1.96 m)	195 lb (88 kg)	So	Baltimore, MD
F	34	Dwayne Wimbley	6 ft 9 in (2.06 m)	245 lb (111 kg)	Jr	Fort Lauderdale, FL
F	40	Tim James	6 ft 7 in (2.01 m)	221 lb (100 kg)	Jr	Miami, FL
G/F	34	Kevin Houston	6 ft 4 in (1.93 m)	215 lb (98 kg)	So	Brooklyn, NY
F	44	Elton Tyler	6 ft 9 in (2.06 m)	215 lb (98 kg)	Fr	Dorchester, MA
F	51	Mario Bland	6 ft 6 in (1.98 m)	265 lb (120 kg)	So	Jackson, MS

Head coach

- Leonard Hamilton (UT Martin)

Assistant coach(es)

- Dwight Freeman (Western Colorado)
- Stan Jones (Memphis)
- Scott Howard (Iowa State)

Legend

- (C) Team captain
- (S) Suspended
- (I) Ineligible
- (W) Walk-on
- Injured
- Current redshirt

== Schedule and results ==
Date time, TV	Rank^{#}	Opponent^{#}	Result	Record	Site (attendance) city, state
Regular season
Nov 14, 1997*; 8:05 p.m.		at Southern Illinois	W 73–61	1–0	Banterra Center (3,826); Carbondale, Illinois
Nov 16, 1997*; 6:00 p.m.		Florida Atlantic	W 69–47	2–0	Miami Arena (1,724); Miami, Florida
Nov 21, 1997*		No. 17 Charlotte	W 89–72	3–0	Miami Arena (3,403); Miami, Florida
Nov 24, 1997*		Eastern Kentucky	W 86–64	4–0	Miami Arena (2,484); Miami, Florida
Nov 29, 1997*		at Jacksonville	W 74–70	5–0	Jacksonville Coliseum (1,865); Jacksonville, Florida
Dec 2, 1997		Rutgers	W 63–55	6–0 (1–0)	Miami Arena (2,579); Miami, Florida
Dec 6, 1997		Georgetown	W 66–56	7–0 (2–0)	Miami Arena (8,031); Miami, Florida
Dec 12, 1997*		Georgia State	W 80–64	8–0	Miami Arena (2,654); Miami, Florida
Dec 22, 1997*		at Memphis	W 65–57	9–0	Pyramid Arena (11,874); Memphis, Tennessee
Dec 27, 1997*		Georgia Tech; Orange Bowl Basketball Classic	L 61–69	9–1	Miami Arena (8,561); Miami, Florida
Dec 31, 1997		at Seton Hall	W 78–65	10–1 (3–0)	Continental Airlines Arena (7,974); East Rutherford, New Jersey
Jan 3, 1998		at Pittsburgh	W 73–65	11–1 (4–0)	Fitzgerald Field House (855); Pittsburgh, Pennsylvania
Jan 6, 1998		No. 10 Connecticut	W 76–67	12–1 (5–0)	Miami Arena (8,247); Miami, Florida
Jan 10, 1998		at No. 25 West Virginia	L 84–98	12–2 (5–1)	WVU Coliseum (13,829); Morgantown, West Virginia
Jan 13, 1998		at St. John's	L 64–73	12–3 (5–2)	Alumni Hall (6,008); Queens, New York
Jan 18, 1998; 12:00 p.m.		at No. 15 Syracuse	L 67–85	12–4 (5–3)	Carrier Dome (22,408); Syracuse, New York
Jan 22, 1998		Villanova	W 78–63	13–4 (6–3)	Miami Arena (5,073); Miami, Florida
Jan 28, 1998		at Boston College	W 67–57	14–4 (7–3)	Silvio O. Conte Forum (4,836); Chestnut Hill, Massachusetts
Jan 31, 1998		at Villanova	L 75–78	14–5 (7–4)	CoreStates Center (6,522); Philadelphia, Pennsylvania
Feb 4, 1998		Providence	W 64–54	15–5 (8–4)	Miami Arena (3,222); Miami, Florida
Feb 10, 1998; 7:30 p.m.		No. 23 Syracuse	L 63–72	15–6 (8–5)	Miami Arena (5,547); Miami, Florida
Feb 14, 1998		Notre Dame	W 66–57	16–6 (9–5)	Miami Arena (4,425); Miami, Florida
Feb 18, 1998		at Providence	L 57–59	16–7 (9–6)	Providence Civic Center (9,345); Providence, Rhode Island
Feb 22, 1998		at Notre Dame	W 65–59	17–7 (10–6)	Joyce Center (11,418); South Bend, Indiana
Feb 25, 1998		Seton Hall	L 71–76	17–8 (10–7)	Miami Arena (4,019); Miami, Florida
Feb 28, 1998		No. 19 West Virginia	W 70–66	18–8 (11–7)	Miami Arena (5,989); Miami, Florida
Big East tournament
Mar 4, 1998*	(4)	vs. (13) Georgetown; First round	L 56–62	18–9	Madison Square Garden (15,377); New York, New York
NCAA tournament
Mar 13, 1998*	(11 SE)	vs. (6 SE) No. 19 UCLA; First round	L 62–65	18–10	Georgia Dome (17,818); Atlanta, Georgia
*Non-conference game. ^{#}Rankings from AP Poll. (#) Tournament seedings in parentheses. SE=Southeast Region. All times are in Eastern Time.
