= 1998 Big East men's basketball tournament =

- Classification: Division I
- Season: 1997–98
- Teams: 13
- Site: Madison Square Garden; New York City
- Champions: Connecticut (3rd title)
- Winning coach: Jim Calhoun (3rd title)
- MVP: Khalid El-Amin (Connecticut)

1997–98 Big East men's basketball standings
	Conf.				Overall
Team	W		L	PCT	W		L	PCT
Big East 6
No. 6 Connecticut†	15	–	3	.833	32	–	5	.865
St. John's	13	–	5	.722	22	–	10	.688
West Virginia	11	–	7	.611	24	–	9	.727
Villanova	8	–	10	.444	12	–	17	.414
Notre Dame	7	–	11	.389	13	–	14	.481
Boston College	6	–	12	.333	15	–	16	.484
Big East 7
No. 21 Syracuse	12	–	6	.667	26	–	9	.743
Miami	11	–	7	.611	18	–	10	.643
Seton Hall	9	–	9	.500	15	–	15	.500
Providence	7	–	11	.389	13	–	16	.448
Pittsburgh	6	–	12	.333	11	–	16	.407
Rutgers	6	–	12	.333	14	–	15	.483
Georgetown	6	–	12	.333	16	–	15	.516
† 1998 Big East tournament winner As of March 30, 1998; Rankings from AP poll

The 1998 Big East men's basketball tournament took place at Madison Square Garden in New York City. Its winner received the Big East Conference's automatic bid to the 1998 NCAA tournament. It is a single-elimination tournament with four rounds and the three highest seeds received byes in the first round. All 13 Big East teams were invited to participate. Connecticut finished with the best record in the regular season and was awarded the top seed.

Connecticut defeated Syracuse in the final, 69–64 to earn its third Big East tournament championship.

== Bracket ==
First round March 4, 1998
8	Providence	72
9	Notre Dame	55
5	#23 West Virginia	65
12	Rutgers	72
4	Miami	56
13	Georgetown	62
6	Seton Hall	87
11	Boston College	97^{OT}
7	Villanova	96^{2OT}
10	Pittsburgh	93

Quarterfinals; March 5, 1998
1	#6 Connecticut	64
8	Providence	55
12	Rutgers	61
13	Georgetown	60
3	St. John's	91
11	Boston College	80
2	#22 Syracuse	69
7	Villanova	66

Semifinals; March 6, 1998
1	#6 Connecticut	64
12	Rutgers	50
3	St. John's	67
2	#22 Syracuse	69^{OT}

Championship Game; March 7, 1998
1	#6 Connecticut	69
2	#22 Syracuse	64

=== Championship game Summary ===
ESPN

Saturday, March 7
8:00 pm

Box Score

#1 Connecticut Huskies 69, #2 Syracuse Orangemen 64
Pts: R. Jones 17; Rebs: R. Jones 9 Asts: K. El-Amin 6	Pts: T. Burgan 17; Rebs: T. Burgan 9 Asts: J. Hart 5 Halftime Score: Connecticut, 27-23

Madison Square Garden - New York, NY
Attendance: 18,521

== Awards ==
Dave Gavitt Trophy (Most Outstanding Player): Khalid El-Amin, Connecticut

All-Tournament Team

- Ron Artest, St. John's
- Ryan Blackwell, Syracuse
- Todd Burgan, Syracuse
- Khalid El-Amin, Connecticut
- Richard Hamilton, Connecticut
- Rashamel Jones, Connecticut
