= 1997–98 Fairleigh Dickinson Knights men's basketball team =

American college basketball season

1997–98 Fairleigh Dickinson Knights men's basketball
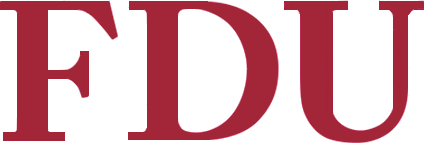

NEC tournament champions

NCAA tournament, First Round
- Conference: Northeast Conference
- Record: 23–7 (13–3 NEC)
- Head coach: Tom Green (15th season)
- Assistant coach: Fred Hill (7th season)
- Home arena: Rothman Center

1997–98 Northeast Conference men's basketball standings
	Conf.				Overall
Team	W		L	PCT	W		L	PCT
Long Island	14	–	2	.875	21	–	11	.656
Fairleigh Dickinson †	13	–	3	.813	23	–	7	.767
St. Francis (NY)	10	–	6	.625	15	–	12	.556
Saint Francis (PA)	10	–	6	.625	17	–	10	.630
Mount St. Mary's	8	–	8	.500	13	–	15	.464
Wagner	7	–	9	.438	13	–	16	.448
Robert Morris	4	–	12	.250	8	–	19	.296
Monmouth	3	–	13	.188	4	–	23	.148
Central Connecticut	3	–	13	.188	4	–	22	.154
† 1998 NEC tournament winner Rankings from AP Poll

The 1997–98 Fairleigh Dickinson Knights men's basketball team represented Fairleigh Dickinson University during the 1997–98 NCAA Division I men's basketball season. The team was led by 15th-year head coach Tom Green. The Knights played their home games at the Rothman Center in Hackensack, New Jersey as members of the Northeast Conference.

The Knights compiled a 23–7 record and went 13–3 in ECAC Metro play to finish second in the conference regular season standings. They defeated Robert Morris, Wagner, and Long Island University to capture the NEC tournament championship. The Knights received the conference's automatic bid to the NCAA tournament as No. 15 seed in the East region. The Knights put up a fight – led by senior Elijah Allen's 43-point effort – but fell to No. 2 seed Connecticut, 93–85, in the opening round.

== Roster ==
1997–98 Fairleigh Dickinson Knights men's basketball team
Players	Coaches
Pos. / # / Name / Height / Weight / Year / Hometown; F / / Rahshon Turner / 6 ft 7 in (2.01 m) / 195 lb (88 kg) / Sr / Passaic, New Jersey	Head coach: Tom Green; Assistant coach(es): Fred Hill; Legend: (C) Team captain; (S) Suspended; (I) Ineligible; (W) Walk-on; Injured; Current redshirt; Roster

== Schedule and results ==
Date time, TV	Rank^{#}	Opponent^{#}	Result	Record	Site (attendance) city, state
Regular season
Nov 18, 1997*		at Maryland	L 70–81	0–1	Cole Fieldhouse; College Park, Maryland
Nov 22, 1997*		Hartford	W 76–66	1–1	Rothman Center; Hackensack, New Jersey
Nov 29, 1997*; 4:00 p.m.		Manhattan	W 70–66	2–1	Rothman Center; Hackensack, New Jersey
Dec 9, 1997*		at Seton Hall	L 65–67		Continental Airlines Arena; East Rutherford, New Jersey
Dec 22, 1997*		Milwaukee	W 91–77		Rothman Center; Hackensack, New Jersey
Jan 10, 1998		at St. Francis (NY)	W 72–69		Generoso Pope Athletic Complex (213); Brooklyn, New York
Jan 17, 1998		at Monmouth	W 85–57		William T. Boylan Gymnasium; West Long Branch, New Jersey
Jan 31, 1998		St. Francis (NY)	W 71–67		Rothman Center (3,376); Hackensack, New Jersey
Feb 19, 1998		Monmouth	W 82–65		Rothman Center; Hackensack, New Jersey
NEC tournament
Feb 26, 1998*		vs. Robert Morris; Quarterfinals	W 89–73	21–6	Detrick Gymnasium; New Britain, Connecticut
Feb 27, 1998*		vs. Wagner; Semifinals	W 78–49	22–6	Detrick Gymnasium; New Britain, Connecticut
Mar 2, 1998*		vs. Long Island University; Championship game	W 105–91	23–6	Schwartz Athletic Center; Brooklyn, New York
NCAA tournament
Mar 12, 1998*	(15 E)	vs. (2 E) No. 6 Connecticut; First round	L 85–93	23–7	MCI Center (19,288); Washington, D.C.
*Non-conference game. ^{#}Rankings from AP Poll. (#) Tournament seedings in parentheses. E=East Source. All times are in Eastern Time.
