= 1997–98 Georgetown Hoyas men's basketball team =

American college basketball season

1997–98 Georgetown Hoyas men's basketball

National Invitation Tournament, second round
- Conference: Big East Conference
- Big East 7 Division
- Record: 16–15 (6–12 Big East)
- Head coach: John Thompson (26th season)
- Assistant coaches: Craig Esherick (16th season); Mike Riley (16th season)
- Captain: Boubacar Aw
- Home arena: US Airways Arena; MCI Center

1997–98 Big East men's basketball standings
	Conf.				Overall
Team	W		L	PCT	W		L	PCT
Big East 6
No. 6 Connecticut†	15	–	3	.833	32	–	5	.865
St. John's	13	–	5	.722	22	–	10	.688
West Virginia	11	–	7	.611	24	–	9	.727
Villanova	8	–	10	.444	12	–	17	.414
Notre Dame	7	–	11	.389	13	–	14	.481
Boston College	6	–	12	.333	15	–	16	.484
Big East 7
No. 21 Syracuse	12	–	6	.667	26	–	9	.743
Miami	11	–	7	.611	18	–	10	.643
Seton Hall	9	–	9	.500	15	–	15	.500
Providence	7	–	11	.389	13	–	16	.448
Pittsburgh	6	–	12	.333	11	–	16	.407
Rutgers	6	–	12	.333	14	–	15	.483
Georgetown	6	–	12	.333	16	–	15	.516
† 1998 Big East tournament winner As of March 30, 1998; Rankings from AP poll

The 1997–98 Georgetown Hoyas men's basketball team represented Georgetown University in the 1997–98 NCAA Division I college basketball season. John Thompson, coached them in his 26th season as head coach. They began the season in November 1997 playing their home games at US Airways Arena in Landover, Maryland, but in December 1997 moved to their new home court, the MCI Center in Washington, D.C.; they also played two home games early in the season at McDonough Gymnasium on the Georgetown campus. They were members of the Big East 7 Division of the Big East Conference and finished the season 16–15, 6–12 in Big East play. They advanced to the quarterfinals of the 1998 Big East men's basketball tournament before losing to Rutgers. Not invited to the NCAA tournament after playing in it during 18 of the previous 19 seasons, they instead appeared in the 1998 National Invitation Tournament (NIT) – the first of three consecutive Georgetown NIT appearances – advancing to the second round before losing to Georgia Tech.

== Season recap ==
The 1997–98 season began after a difficult offseason for the Georgetown men's basketball program. Like guard Allen Iverson in 1996, standout point guard Victor Page had broken with the Georgetown tradition of playing a full four years, leaving school after his sophomore season to enter the NBA draft. During the summer of 1997, forward Shamel Jones and guard-forward Jerry Nichols had transferred to Memphis and Mississippi Valley State, respectively, and in August 1997 guard Ed Sheffey had been dismissed from the team before beginning his sophomore season and had transferred to New Mexico State. These losses meant that the Hoyas would have a depleted roster for 1997–98. Making matters worse, one of Georgetown's more promising recruits, freshman center Ruben Boumtje-Boumtje, played only six games before suffering a season-ending wrist injury, followed by knee surgery. Senior center Jahidi White started the season showing signs that he would have his best season ever, averaging in double figures in scoring and posting five of his eight career double-doubles in the first 10 games of the season, but he lasted little longer than Boumtje-Boumtje; after scoring 10 points and grabbing eight rebounds against West Virginia, he, too, suffered a season-ending wrist injury that brought his college career to an end after the tenth game of the year. And freshman guard Kenny Brunner played in 19 games, starting all of them and averaging 11.2 points per game, but left the team at midseason and transferred to Fresno State.

The loss of players meant that Georgetown's roster was reduced to as few as seven players at times. Freshman guard Nat Burton, destined to become one of Georgetown's top players of the era, was thrust into a starting role in only his second collegiate game; he started 17 of the team's 31 games and scored in double figures five times, averaging 5.1 points per game for the year. Sophomore guard-forward Shernard Long finished the year as the Hoyas' leading scorer, but senior forward and team captain Boubacar Aw sometimes was the Hoyas' only effective offensive player. Although Aw was a poor free-throw shooter, averaging only 53.2 percent from the free-throw line, he shot 52.1 percent from the field for the season and scored in double figures 13 times in his last 18 games, including a 21-point, 18-rebound performance against Seton Hall, and he led Georgetown in scoring in six consecutive games. Aw finished the season behind only Long in scoring, but his 211 points in the regular season's 18 Big East games was the highest among Georgetown players against conference opponents.

Staggered by the attrition among its players, the team struggled during the season and often was unable to hold leads. Georgetown had an overall record of only 13–10 and was only 5–9 in Big East play, when Pittsburgh came to the MCI Center on the evening of February 17, 1998. Aw scored a career-high 24 points in the game, but the Hoyas as a team shot only 34 percent from the field and scored a season-low 19 field goals. However, Georgetown kept the game close with an outstanding free-throw shooting performance; averaging only 60 percent from the free throw line as a team entering the game, the Hoyas shot 24-for-28 (85.7%) in free throws in the first half and 14-for-17 (82.4%) during the first 19 minutes 58 seconds of the second half. On the final play of the game, Pittsburgh fouled Aw – who shot a career-best 7-for-8 (87.5%) from the free-throw line during the game – with two seconds left to play and Georgetown trailing 80–78. Aw made the first free throw but missed the second, and the Hoyas lost 80–79. The remarkable team free-throw effort (39-for-46, 84.8%) had fallen one shot short of forcing overtime.

Following the loss to Pittsburgh, the Hoyas dropped two of their final three regular-season games to fall to 14–13 overall and 6–12 in Big East play, leaving them in a three-way tie for last place in the Big East 7 Division. Seeded 13th in the 1998 Big East tournament, they upset No. 4 seed Miami in the first round, but lost in the quarterfinals to No. 12 seed Rutgers. Their 15–14 record after the loss precluded them from receiving an invitation to the 1998 NCAA tournament, and they became only the second Georgetown team to miss the tournament since the 1978–79 season.

The Hoyas instead accepted an invitation to the 1998 National Invitation Tournament (NIT), the second Georgetown team to appear in the NIT since the 1992–93 season. In the first round, they met Florida. Although the Gators were a good three-point-shooting team, Georgetown's strong defensive performance allowed the Hoyas to hold a lead for much of the game, and Georgetown led 69–62 with 2:15 remaining in the game. But the Hoyas again could not hold on to a lead; they failed to score on three straight possessions, while Florida scored seven points in the next 1:10, tying the game at 69–69 with a three-pointer with 1:05 left to play. With the score still tied 69–69, Georgetown lost the ball and Florida called a timeout with 22 seconds left to set up a game-winning shot. When play resumed, Florida's Kenyon Weeks drove toward the basket to make the shot, but Georgetown sophomore center Jameel Watkins stole the ball from him and passed it to sophomore guard Damien Bolden, who dribbled across halfcourt. Bolden passed the ball to Aw, who drove toward the basket before dishing the ball off to Shernard Long. Long scored to give Georgetown a dramatic last-second 71–69 win.

Georgetown advanced to the second round of the NIT to face Georgia Tech. The game went into overtime, but Georgia Tech ultimately prevailed 80–79 to knock the Hoyas out of the tournament. The 1997–98 Hoyas finished the season with an overall 16–15 (.516) record, the poorest Georgetown record since the 1973–74 team's 13–13 (.500) finish.

This was the last of Georgetown's three seasons as a member of the Big East 7 Division. For the following season, the Big East scrapped its Big East 6 and Big East 7 divisional structure and returned to play as a unified conference.

== Roster ==
#	Name	Height	Weight (lbs.)	Position	Class	Hometown	Previous Team(s)
0	Trez Kilpatrick	6'7"	219	F	So.	Hallandale, Florida	Hallandale HS; Neosho County Community College (Kansas)
3	Kenny Brunner	5'11"	185	G	Fr.	Compton, California	Manuel Domniguez HS
4	Joseph Touomou	6'2"	195	G	Jr.	Yaoundé, Cameroon	Williamston HS (Williamston, North Carolina)
11	Daymond Jackson	6'4"	205	G/F	Jr.	Alexandria, Virginia	T. C. Williams HS
12	Dean Berry	5'10"	168	G	Jr.	Brooklyn, New York	Episcopal HS
15	Shernard Long	6'5"	190	G/F	So.	Tucker, Georgia	Tucker HS
20	Damien Bolden	6'3"	180	G	So.	Portland, Oregon	Lincoln HS
22	Boubacar Aw	6'7"	228	F	Sr.	Thiès, Senegal	East Columbus HS (Lake Waccamaw, North Carolina)
25	Nat Burton	6'4"	218	G/F	So.	Washington, D.C.	Winchendon Prep (Winchendon, Massachusetts)
32	Rhese Gibson	6'8"	230	F	So.	New York City, New York	All Hallows HS
40	Jameel Watkins	6'10"	244	C	So.	Brooklyn, New York	Paul Robeson HS
44	Ruben Boumtje-Boumtje	7'0"	257	C	Fr.	Yaoundé, Cameroon	Archbishop Carroll HS (Washington, D.C.)
55	Jahidi White	6'9"	290	C	Sr.	St. Louis, Missouri	Cardinal Ritter College Prep HS

== Rankings ==
The team was not ranked in the Top 25 in the AP Poll at any time. It also was not ranked in the Top 25 of the final or postseason Coaches' Poll; its Coaches' Poll rankings during the rest of the season are not available.

== 1997–98 Schedule and results ==
Sources

- All times are Eastern

Date time, TV	Rank^{#}	Opponent^{#}	Result	Record	Site (attendance) city, state
Regular Season
Sat., Nov. 15, 1997*		Georgia State	W 89−72	1–0	US Airways Arena (6,827); Landover, Maryland
Mon., Nov. 17, 1997*		Morgan State	W 98−51	2–0	US Airways Arena (4,718); Landover, Maryland
Fri., Nov. 21, 1997*		vs. Wake Forest; Hall of Fame Tip-Off Classic	L 54−56	2–1	Springfield Civic Center (8,820); Springfield, Massachusetts
Tue., Nov. 25, 1997*		Cleveland State	W 78−56	3–1	US Airways Arena (6,483); Landover, Maryland
Wed., Dec. 3, 1997		Villanova	L 69−73	3–2 (0–1)	MCI Center (13,181); Washington, D.C.
Sat., Dec. 6, 1997		at Miami	L 56−66	3–3 (0–2)	Miami Arena (8,031); Miami, Florida
Thu., Dec. 18, 1997*		Bethune–Cookman	W 85–41	4–3	McDonough Gymnasium (1,388); Washington, D.C.
Sat., Dec. 20, 1997*		Saint Leo	W 101–47	5–3	McDonough Gymnasium (N/A); Washington, D.C.
Mon., Dec. 29, 1997*		Southern-New Orleans	W 85−48	6–3	MCI Center (11,124); Washington, D.C.
Wed., Dec. 31, 1997		No. 22 West Virginia	W 74–65	7–3 (1–2)	MCI Center (12,031); Washington, D.C.
Sat., Jan. 3, 1998		Providence	W 58−56	8–3 (2–2)	MCI Center (11,658); Washington, D.C.
Mon., Jan. 5, 1998		at No. 25 West Virginia	L 70−81	8–4 (2–3)	WVU Coliseum (10,091); Morgantown, West Virginia
Sat., Jan. 10, 1998		St. John's	L 60–66	8–5 (2–4)	MCI Center (14,238); Washington, D.C.
Mon., Jan. 12, 1998		at Villanova	W 67–61	9–5 (3–4)	CoreStates Center (11,870); Philadelphia, Pennsylvania
Sat., Jan. 17, 1998		at No. 10 Connecticut; Rivalry	L 72–86	9–6 (3–5)	Hartford Civic Center (16,294); Hartford, Connecticut
Tue., Jan. 20, 1998		Seton Hall	W 68–66	10–6 (4–5)	MCI Center (8,176); Washington, D.C.
Sat., Jan. 24, 1998*		Memphis	W 73–69	11–6	MCI Center (14,849); Washington, D.C.
Mon., Jan. 26, 1998; 7:30 p.m.		No. 20 Syracuse; Rivalry	L 66–84	11–7 (4–6)	MCI Center (14,408); Washington, D.C.
Sun., Feb. 1, 1998		at Boston College	L 63–74	11−8 (4–7)	Silvio O. Conte Forum (6,718); Chestnut Hill, Massachusetts
Tue., Feb. 3, 1998		at Seton Hall	L 57–68	11−9 (4–8)	Continental Airlines Arena (8,210); East Rutherford, New Jersey
Sat., Feb. 7, 1998		Notre Dame	W 76–56	12–9 (5–8)	MCI Center (16,609); Washington, D.C.
Wed., Feb. 11, 1998		at Rutgers	L 63–83	12–10 (5–9)	Louis Brown Athletic Center (6,719); Piscataway, New Jersey
Sat., Feb. 14, 1998*		at DePaul	W 65–59	13–10	United Center (N/A); Chicago, Illinois
Tue., Feb. 17, 1998		Pittsburgh	L 79–80	13–11 (5–10)	MCI Center (8,634); Washington, D.C.
Sat., Feb. 21, 1998		Boston College	W 84–67	14–11 (6–10)	MCI Center (14,964); Washington, D.C.
Wed., Feb. 25, 1998		at Notre Dame	L 69–79	14–12 (6–11)	Edmund P. Joyce Center (10,124); Notre Dame, Indiana
Sun., Mar. 1, 1998; 12:00 noon		at No. 22 Syracuse; Rivalry	L 72–77 ^{OT}	14–13 (6–12)	Carrier Dome (27,726); Syracuse, New York
Big East tournament
Wed., Mar. 4, 1998		vs. Miami; First Round	W 62–56	15–13	Madison Square Garden (15,377); New York City, New York
Thu., Mar. 5, 1998		vs. Rutgers; Quarterfinal	L 60–61	15–14	Madison Square Garden (14,844); New York City, New York
National Invitation Tournament
Wed., Mar. 11, 1998		at Florida; First Round	W 71–69	16–14	O'Connell Center (4,319); Gainesville, Florida
Mon., Mar. 16, 1998		at Georgia Tech; Second Round	L 79–80 ^{OT}	16–15	Alexander Memorial Coliseum (8,566); Atlanta, Georgia
*Non-conference game. ^{#}Rankings from AP Poll. (#) Tournament seedings in parentheses.
