= Kashif Hameed =

American basketball player

Personal information
- Born: December 21, 1977 (age 48) New York City, New York, U.S.
- Listed height: 6 ft 8 in (2.03 m)
- Listed weight: 230 lb (104 kg)

Career information
- High school: Notre Dame-Bishop Gibbons (Schenectady, New York)
- College: Iona (1995–1999)
- NBA draft: 1999: undrafted
- Playing career: 2000–2008
- Position: Power forward

Career history
- 2000–2001: Rabotnički
- 2005–2006: Fribourg Olympic
- 2006: Long Island PrimeTime
- 2006–2007: JL Bourg-en-Bresse
- 2007–2008: Porto Ferpinta

Career highlights
- MAAC Player of the Year (1998); First-team All-MAAC (1998); Second-team All-MAAC (1999)

Kashif Hameed (born December 21, 1977) is an American former professional basketball player. He played college basketball for Iona.
