= 1997–98 Pittsburgh Panthers men's basketball team =

American college basketball season

1997–98 Pittsburgh Panthers men's basketball
- Conference: Big East Conference (1979–2013)
- Record: 11–16 (6–12 Big East)
- Head coach: Ralph Willard (4th season)
- Assistant coaches: Jim Christian (2nd season); Troy Weaver (2nd season); Vince Taylor (1st season)
- Home arena: Fitzgerald Field House (Capacity: 4,122)

1997–98 Big East men's basketball standings
	Conf.				Overall
Team	W		L	PCT	W		L	PCT
Big East 6
No. 6 Connecticut†	15	–	3	.833	32	–	5	.865
St. John's	13	–	5	.722	22	–	10	.688
West Virginia	11	–	7	.611	24	–	9	.727
Villanova	8	–	10	.444	12	–	17	.414
Notre Dame	7	–	11	.389	13	–	14	.481
Boston College	6	–	12	.333	15	–	16	.484
Big East 7
No. 21 Syracuse	12	–	6	.667	26	–	9	.743
Miami	11	–	7	.611	18	–	10	.643
Seton Hall	9	–	9	.500	15	–	15	.500
Providence	7	–	11	.389	13	–	16	.448
Pittsburgh	6	–	12	.333	11	–	16	.407
Rutgers	6	–	12	.333	14	–	15	.483
Georgetown	6	–	12	.333	16	–	15	.516
† 1998 Big East tournament winner As of March 30, 1998; Rankings from AP poll

The 1997–98 Pittsburgh Panthers men's basketball team represented the University of Pittsburgh in the 1997–98 NCAA Division I men's basketball season. Led by head coach Ralph Willard, the Panthers finished with a record of 11–16.
