= Ryan Blackwell =

American basketball player and coach

Siena Saints
- Position: Assistant coach
- League: MAAC

Personal information
- Born: December 8, 1976 (age 49) Champaign, Illinois, U.S.
- Listed height: 6 ft 7 in (2.01 m)
- Listed weight: 243 lb (110 kg)

Career information
- High school: Pittsford Sutherland (Pittsford, New York)
- College: Illinois (1995–1996); Syracuse (1997–2000)

Career history

Playing
- 2000: Champagne Châlons-Reims Basket
- 2001: Gary Steelheads
- 2001–2002: Ginásio C.F.
- 2002–2003: Brighton Bears
- 2004–2005: EA Sports All-Stars
- 2005–2006: Club Trouville
- 2006–2008: Sendai 89ers
- 2009–2010: Osaka Evessa

Coaching
- 2010–2012: Osaka Evessa
- 2012–2013: Gunma Crane Thunders
- 2014–2015: Syracuse Shockwave
- 2015–2024: Liverpool HS
- 2022–2024: Syracuse Stallions (assistant)
- 2024–present: Siena (assistant)

Career highlights
- First-team Parade All-American (1995)

Ryan Marcus Blackwell (born December 8, 1976) is an American basketball coach and former professional player who is an assistant coach for the Siena Saints.

== College career ==
=== Illinois ===
Blackwell started his college career at the University of Illinois in 1995. He appeared in 30 games his freshman season before transferring to Syracuse and sitting out the 1996–1997 season due to transfer protocols.

=== Syracuse ===
Blackwell debuted for Syracuse in the 1997–1998 season. Blackwell started every game for the Orange over the next three years, averaging 11.8 points, 7.8 rebounds and 2.6 assists per game and helping to lead them to three straight NCAA Tournament appearances and two Sweet 16 appearance (1998 and 2000).

Blackwell is best remembered by Syracuse fans for making the game-winning, buzzer-beating shot, in overtime, against St. John's in the 1998 Big East Tournament. The 69–67 win sent the Orange to Big East Championship game where they would fall to Connecticut 69–64.

== Coaching career ==
After the conclusion of his playing career, Blackwell worked as a coach at different levels. He served as the head boy's basketball coach at Liverpool High School in Liverpool, New York for nine years before accepting a position as an assistant coach at Siena College in 2024.

== Head coaching record ==
Legend
Regular season	G	Games coached	W	Games won	L	Games lost	W–L %	Win–loss %
Playoffs	PG	Playoff games	PW	Playoff wins	PL	Playoff losses	PW–L %	Playoff win–loss %

Team	Year	G	W	L	W–L%	Finish	PG	PW	PL	PW–L%	Result
Osaka Evessa	2010–11	50	32	18	.640	2nd in Western	4	3	1	.750	3rd place
Osaka Evessa	2011–12	52	35	17	.673	2nd in Western	3	1	2	.333	Lost in 2nd round
Gunma Crane Thunders	2012–13	44	14	30	.318	11th in Eastern	-	-	-	–	-
Gunma Crane Thunders	2013	20	3	17	.150	Fired	-	-	-	–	-
