= 1998 Big Ten men's basketball tournament =

Inaugural tournament

- Classification: Division I
- Season: 1997–98
- Teams: 11
- Site: United Center; Chicago, Illinois
- Champions: Michigan* (Vacated) (1st title)
- Winning coach: Brian Ellerbe (1st title)
- MVP: Robert Traylor (Michigan)

1997–98 Big Ten Conference men's basketball standings
	Conf.				Overall
Team	W		L	PCT	W		L	PCT
No. 16 Michigan State	13	–	3	.813	22	–	8	.733
No. 22 Illinois	13	–	3	.813	23	–	10	.697
No. 11 Purdue	12	–	4	.750	28	–	8	.778
Iowa	9	–	7	.563	20	–	11	.645
Indiana	9	–	7	.563	20	–	12	.625
Penn State	8	–	8	.500	19	–	13	.594
Northwestern	3	–	13	.188	10	–	17	.370
Wisconsin	3	–	13	.188	12	–	19	.387
Ohio State	1	–	15	.063	8	–	22	.267
No. 12 Michigan* †	0	–	5	.000	0	–	8	.000
Minnesota**	0	–	10	.000	0	–	15	.000
† 1998 Big Ten tournament winner Rankings from AP poll *Michigan: 24 reg. season games including Big Ten Tourn. Champ.; 2 NCAA Tourn. games vacated due to sanctions against the program **Minnesota: 15 games including 5 NIT games and championship vacated due to sanctions against the program Disputed records: Michigan 25–9, 11–5; Minnesota 20–15, 6–10

The 1998 Big Ten men's basketball tournament was the inaugural postseason men's basketball tournament for the Big Ten Conference and was played from March 5 through March 8, 1998 at the United Center in Chicago, Illinois. The championship was won by Michigan who defeated Purdue in the championship game. As a result, Michigan received the Big Ten's automatic bid to the NCAA tournament.

Due to the Michigan basketball scandal, Michigan later vacated games from this tournament. Similarly, due to the Minnesota academic scandal, Minnesota's appearance in this tournament was vacated.

== Seeds ==
All 11 Big Ten schools participated in the tournament. Teams were seeded by conference record, with a tiebreaker system used to seed teams with identical conference records. Seeding for the tournament was determined at the close of the regular conference season. The top five teams received a first round bye.

Seed	School	Conference	1st Tiebreaker	2nd Tiebreaker
1	Michigan State	13–3	1–1 vs. Ill.	1–1 vs. Pur
2	Illinois	13–3	1–1 vs. MSU	0–2 vs. Pur
3	Purdue	12–4		
4	Michigan	11–5		
5	Iowa	9–7	2–0 vs. Ind	
6	Indiana	9–7	0–2 vs. Iowa	
7	Penn State	8–8		
8	Minnesota	6–10		
9	Northwestern	3–13	1–1 vs. Wisc	0–1 vs. MSU
10	Wisconsin	3–13	1–1 vs. NW	0–2 vs. MSU
11	Ohio State	1–15		

== Bracket ==
Opening round March 5
8	Minnesota	64
9	Northwestern	56
7	Penn State	51
10	Wisconsin	52
6	Indiana	78
11	Ohio State	71

Quarterfinals; March 6
1	#12 Michigan State	73
8	Minnesota	76
4	#17 Michigan	77
5	Iowa	66
2	#18 Illinois	66
10	Wisconsin	61
3	#9 Purdue	76
6	Indiana	71

Semifinals; March 7
8	Minnesota	69
4	#17 Michigan	85
2	#18 Illinois	47
3	#9 Purdue	68

Championship; March 8
4	#17 Michigan	76
3	#9 Purdue	67

== All-Tournament Team ==
- Robert Traylor, Michigan – Big Ten tournament Most Outstanding Player (Vacated)
- Jerod Ward, Michigan
- Quincy Lewis, Minnesota
- Brad Miller, Purdue
- Mike Robinson, Purdue
