= 1997–98 Michigan Wolverines men's basketball team =

American college basketball season

1997–98 Michigan Wolverines men's basketball

Big Ten tournament champions (vacated)

NCAA tournament, Round of 32 (vacated)
- Conference: Big Ten Conference

Ranking
- Coaches: No. 17
- AP: No. 12
- Record: 0–8 (25–9 unadjusted) (0–5 Big Ten)
- Head coach: Brian Ellerbe (interim)
- Assistant coaches: Brian Dutcher; Scott Trost
- MVP: Robert Traylor
- Captains: Travis Conlan; Robert Traylor
- Home arena: Crisler Arena

1997–98 Big Ten Conference men's basketball standings
	Conf.				Overall
Team	W		L	PCT	W		L	PCT
No. 16 Michigan State	13	–	3	.813	22	–	8	.733
No. 22 Illinois	13	–	3	.813	23	–	10	.697
No. 11 Purdue	12	–	4	.750	28	–	8	.778
Iowa	9	–	7	.563	20	–	11	.645
Indiana	9	–	7	.563	20	–	12	.625
Penn State	8	–	8	.500	19	–	13	.594
Northwestern	3	–	13	.188	10	–	17	.370
Wisconsin	3	–	13	.188	12	–	19	.387
Ohio State	1	–	15	.063	8	–	22	.267
No. 12 Michigan* †	0	–	5	.000	0	–	8	.000
Minnesota**	0	–	10	.000	0	–	15	.000
† 1998 Big Ten tournament winner Rankings from AP poll *Michigan: 24 reg. season games including Big Ten Tourn. Champ.; 2 NCAA Tourn. games vacated due to sanctions against the program **Minnesota: 15 games including 5 NIT games and championship vacated due to sanctions against the program Disputed records: Michigan 25–9, 11–5; Minnesota 20–15, 6–10

The 1997–98 Michigan Wolverines men's basketball team represented the University of Michigan in intercollegiate college basketball during the 1997–98 season. The team played its home games in the Crisler Arena in Ann Arbor, Michigan, and was a member of the Big Ten Conference. Under the direction of head coach Brian Ellerbe, the team finished fourth in the Big Ten Conference. The team emerged victorious in the inaugural 1998 Big Ten Conference men's basketball tournament. The team earned an invitation to the 1998 NCAA Division I men's basketball tournament as a number three seed where it was eliminated in the second round. The team was ranked for twelve of the eighteen weeks of Associated Press Top Twenty-Five Poll, starting the season unranked, peaking at number twelve where it ended the season, and it also ended the season ranked twelve in the final USA Today/CNN Poll. The team had a 4–3 December 13, 1997, against #1 Duke 81–73 at home, December 26, 1997, against #19 Syracuse 93–61 at the Puerto Rico Holiday Classic, Eugene Guerra Sports Complex in San Juan, Puerto Rico, February 1 against #16 Iowa 80–66 on the road, March 8 against #9 Purdue 76–67 at the 1998 Big Ten Conference men's basketball tournament at the United Center. The victory over Duke was one of only two victories over the number one ranked team in the country in the history of the school.

Robert Traylor and Travis Conlan served as team co-captains, while Robert Traylor and Louis Bullock shared team MVP honors. The team's leading scorers were Louis Bullock (580 points), Robert Traylor (552 points) and Jerod Ward (445 points). The leading rebounders were Traylor (347), Maceo Baston (227), and Jerod Ward (206).

Bullock led the Big Ten Conference in three-point field goals made in conference games (51) and all games (93). He also led the conference in three-point field goal percentage in conference games (48.1%) and free throw percentage in all games (91.1%). The team led the Big Ten Conference in three-point field goals made in conference games (121) and three-point field goal percentage (40.1%).

Maceo Baston ended his career with the current Michigan record for career field goal percentage, with a 62.72%, surpassing the 61.70% mark set by Loy Vaught in 1990. On February 22, 1998, against Indiana, the team made 15 three-point field goals, establishing a new school single-game record that would last until December 13, 2008. The team also broke the single-season three-point shot record of 203 set the prior year by making 260, which was a record that would last until 2009.

In the 1998 Big Ten Conference men's basketball tournament at the United Center from March 5–8, Michigan was seeded fourth and earned a first round bye. In the second round, they defeated number five Iowa 77–66. In the semifinals, they defeated number eight Minnesota 85–69. In the championship game, they defeated number three Purdue 76–67.

Due to the Michigan basketball scandal, Michigan has vacated the records from this season.

== Schedule ==
1997-98* (NC sanctioned) Overall: 25-9 Big Ten: 11-5 (4th) Big Ten Tournament: #4 seed (CHAMPION*) Postseason: NCAA (South), #3 seed (Second Round*) Head Coach: Brian Ellerbe (1st season, interim) Staff: Brian Dutcher & Scott Trost Captains: Travis Conlan & Robert Traylor Home Arena: Crisler Arena (13,562)

Date Rk Opponent H/A W/L Score +/-
11/15/1997 - Western Michigan H L* 63-68 -5
11/19/1997 - Cleveland State H W* 77-59 +18
11/24/1997 - at Towson A W* 75-73 +2
11/30/1997 - at Detroit A W* 54-53 +1
12/3/1997 - Florida International H W* 71-62 +9
12/6/1997 - UNLV H W* 83-59 +24
12/8/1997 - at Bradley A L* 58-63 -5
12/13/1997 - #1 Duke H W* 81-73 +8
12/17/1997 #21 Eastern Michigan (OT) H L* 83-89 -6
12/20/1997 #21 Chattanooga H W* 87-53 +34
12/24/1997 - vs. Murray State N1 W* 76-53 +23
12/25/1997 - vs. American P.R. N1 W* 94-49 +45
12/26/1997 - vs. #19 Syracuse N1 W* 93-61 +32
12/31/1997 #18 at Wisconsin+ A W* 76-63 +13
1/3/1998 #18 Penn State+ H W* 92-75 +17
1/6/1998 #17 at Indiana+ A L* 62-90 -28
1/10/1998 #17 Michigan State+ H W* 79-69 +10
1/17/1998 #19 at Ohio State+ A W* 79-61 +18
1/20/1998 #16 Minnesota+ H W* 65-57 +8
1/25/1998 #16 at Illinois+ A L* 53-64 -11
1/29/1998 #19 #10 Purdue+ H L* 82-89 -7
2/1/1998 #19 at #16 Iowa+ A W* 80-66 +14
2/5/1998 #18 Northwestern+ H W* 74-67 +7
2/7/1998 #18 at Minnesota+ A L* 78-88 -10
2/11/1998 #21 Ohio State+ H W* 76-68 +8
2/17/1998 #22 at Michigan State+ A L* 75-80 -5
2/22/1998 #22 Indiana+ H W* 112-64 +48
2/25/1998 #21 at Penn State+ A W* 77-61 +16
2/28/1998 #21 Wisconsin+ H W* 76-70 +6
3/6/1998 #17 vs. Iowa N2 W* 77-66 +11
3/7/1998 #17 vs. Minnesota N2 W* 85-69 +16
3/8/1998 #17 vs. #9 Purdue N2 W* 76-67 +9
3/13/1998 #12 vs. Davidson (S14) N3 W* 80-61 +19
3/15/1998 #12 vs. #19 UCLA (S6) N3 L* 82-85 -3

- U-M vacated wins/losses due to NC sanctions

(1) Puerto Rico Holiday Classic, San Juan, P.R. (Guerra Sports Complex) (2) Big Ten Tournament, Chicago, Ill. (United Center); inaugural

== Rankings ==
Ranking movements Legend: ██ Increase in ranking ██ Decrease in ranking
	Week																	
Poll	Pre	1	2	3	4	5	6	7	8	9	10	11	12	13	14	15	16	Final
AP Poll						21		18	17	19	16	19	18	21	22	21	17	12

== Team players drafted into the NBA ==
Three players from this team were selected in the NBA draft.

Year	Round	Pick	Overall	Player	NBA Club
1998	1	6	6	Robert Traylor	Dallas Mavericks
1998	2	29	58	Maceo Baston	Chicago Bulls
1999	2	13	42	Louis Bullock	Minnesota Timberwolves

== See also ==
- 1998 NCAA Division I men's basketball tournament
- List of vacated and forfeited games in college basketball
- University of Michigan basketball scandal
