= 1997–98 Wisconsin Badgers men's basketball team =

American college basketball season

1997–98 Wisconsin Badgers men's basketball
- Conference: Big Ten Conference
- Record: 12-19 (3-13 Big Ten)
- Head coach: Dick Bennett (3rd season)
- Assistant coaches: Brad Soderberg; Shawn Hood; Brian Hecker
- Home arena: UW Field House (capacity: 11,500); Kohl Center

1997–98 Big Ten Conference men's basketball standings
	Conf.				Overall
Team	W		L	PCT	W		L	PCT
No. 16 Michigan State	13	–	3	.813	22	–	8	.733
No. 22 Illinois	13	–	3	.813	23	–	10	.697
No. 11 Purdue	12	–	4	.750	28	–	8	.778
Iowa	9	–	7	.563	20	–	11	.645
Indiana	9	–	7	.563	20	–	12	.625
Penn State	8	–	8	.500	19	–	13	.594
Northwestern	3	–	13	.188	10	–	17	.370
Wisconsin	3	–	13	.188	12	–	19	.387
Ohio State	1	–	15	.063	8	–	22	.267
No. 12 Michigan* †	0	–	5	.000	0	–	8	.000
Minnesota**	0	–	10	.000	0	–	15	.000
† 1998 Big Ten tournament winner Rankings from AP poll *Michigan: 24 reg. season games including Big Ten Tourn. Champ.; 2 NCAA Tourn. games vacated due to sanctions against the program **Minnesota: 15 games including 5 NIT games and championship vacated due to sanctions against the program Disputed records: Michigan 25–9, 11–5; Minnesota 20–15, 6–10

The 1997–98 Wisconsin Badgers men's basketball team represented the University of Wisconsin–Madison as a member of the Big Ten Conference during the 1997-98 NCAA Division I men's basketball season. Head coach Dick Bennett completed his third season coaching with the Badgers. In the program's centennial season, the team played its home games in Madison, Wisconsin at both the UW Field House and later the Kohl Center, which the Badgers opened on January 17, 1998, with a 56–33 win over Northwestern.

== Season summary ==
Wisconsin was unable to build on the previous year's success during a tumultuous season. Down two of its top players by midseason, the squad struggled to shoot well consistently. The Badgers scored fewer than 50 points seven times, going winless in those games. Notably, Wisconsin let back-to-back home games slip away to Iowa (79–76) and Illinois (53–47 in overtime) to start February, which dropped its season mark to 10–13. The losses were part of an 11-game Big Ten losing streak to end the regular season, which was interrupted only by a non-conference win over Wisconsin-Milwaukee.

True to Bennett's style, however, the Badgers led the Big Ten in scoring defense by allowing 62.6 points per contest. Though the team failed to receive a postseason invite, the substantial minutes played by four freshman laid groundwork for the memorable tournament run to come in 2000. Wisconsin rebounded from consecutive early losses to Pepperdine and Pacific to beat No. 18 Oklahoma and Montana to win the consolation bracket at the Big Island Invitational in Hawaii. Other highlights include going 2–1 against Top 25 teams in non-conference play and christening a new arena with a win.

A No. 10 seed in the inaugural Big Ten tournament, Wisconsin opened against Penn State in Chicago. Freshman Maurice Linton's jumper in the final seconds advanced the Badgers, 52–51. In the quarterfinals, Illinois held Wisconsin to 10 points at halftime. A furious Badger comeback erased an 18-point deficit but ultimately fell short in the final six minutes.

=== Ty Calderwood injury ===
Lingering complications from off-season knee surgery prevented Ty Calderwood from playing a single minute in 1997–98. It was a substantial blow, as a year earlier, the junior point guard led the Big Ten in steals and guided Wisconsin back to the NCAA Tournament. Calderwood was forced to take a medical redshirt. As a result, Mike Kelley became the first Badger freshman guard to start the season opener since Rick Olson in 1982.

=== Sam Okey's departure ===
Junior forward Sam Okey was suspended by head coach Dick Bennett for the start of the campaign, including the first two regular season games, reportedly for marijuana use. Upon his reinstatement, Okey battled back spasms which caused him to miss four of the next 13 games as Wisconsin fought to an 8–7 record. Clashes over his role, work ethic and off-the-court issues came to a head on January 13, 1998, when Okey quit the team. The Badgers went 4–12 the remainder of the season. Okey transferred to the University of Iowa to play his senior year.

== Awards ==
Sean Mason was an Honorable Mention All-Big Ten pick by the coaches and media at the conclusion of the season.

== Roster ==
1997–98 Wisconsin Badgers men's basketball team
Players
Coaches

Pos.	#	Name	Height	Weight	Year	Hometown
G/F	3	Duany Duany	6 ft 5 in (1.96 m)	190 lb (86 kg)	RS So	Bloomington, IN
F	4	Sam Okey (S)	6 ft 7 in (2.01 m)	235 lb (107 kg)	Jr	Cassville, WI
G	5	Hennssy Auriantal	6 ft 1 in (1.85 m)	190 lb (86 kg)	Jr	Montreal
G	10	Jon Bryant (I) (redshirt)	6 ft 2 in (1.88 m)	185 lb (84 kg)	Jr	Plymouth, MN
G	11	Sean Mason (C)	6 ft 2 in (1.88 m)	175 lb (79 kg)	RS Jr	Country Club Hills, IL
G	12	Ty Calderwood (injured) (C) (redshirt)	6 ft 0 in (1.83 m)	180 lb (82 kg)	Jr	Joliet, IL
G	14	John Moriarity (W) (redshirt)	6 ft 4 in (1.93 m)	175 lb (79 kg)	Fr	Oostburg, WI
F	15	Andy Kowske	6 ft 8 in (2.03 m)	220 lb (100 kg)	Fr	Brookfield, WI
G	22	Mike Kelley	6 ft 3 in (1.91 m)	180 lb (82 kg)	Fr	Menomonee Falls, WI
G	25	David Burkemper	6 ft 1 in (1.85 m)	200 lb (91 kg)	Sr	Hubertus, WI
F	30	Maurice Linton	6 ft 8 in (2.03 m)	205 lb (93 kg)	Fr	Calumet City, IL
G	32	Chris Chambers (W)	6 ft 1 in (1.85 m)	180 lb (82 kg)	Fr	Bedford, OH
F	33	Brian Vraney (W)	6 ft 6 in (1.98 m)	240 lb (109 kg)	Sr	Valders, WI
F	40	Charlie Wills (redshirt)	6 ft 8 in (2.03 m)	225 lb (102 kg)	Fr	Angola, IN
F/C	41	Booker Coleman	6 ft 9 in (2.06 m)	230 lb (104 kg)	Sr	Jamestown, NY
F	50	Mark Vershaw	6 ft 9 in (2.06 m)	240 lb (109 kg)	Fr	East Peoria, IL
F	52	Sean Daugherty (C)	6 ft 10 in (2.08 m)	230 lb (104 kg)	Sr	Vincennes, IN

Head coach

- Dick Bennett (Ripon)

Assistant coach(es)

- Brad Soderberg (Ripon)
- Shawn Hood
- Brian Hecker

Legend

- (C) Team captain
- (S) Suspended
- (I) Ineligible
- (W) Walk-on
- Injured
- Current redshirt

Roster

== Schedule ==
Date time, TV	Opponent	Result	Record	High points	High rebounds	High assists	Site (attendance) city, state
Regular Season
11/14/1997*	Marquette	L 60-65	0-1	22 – Daugherty	6 – Auriental, Kelley, Vershaw	3 – Kelley, Mason	UW Field House (11,500); Madison, WI
11/18/1997*	No. 24 Illinois State	W 80-66	1-1	20 – Mason	4 – Auriental	5 – Burkemper	UW Field House (11,500); Madison, WI
11/24/1997*	at Pepperdine	L 66–77	1-2	21 – Mason	7 – Okey	5 – Kelley	Firestone Fieldhouse (2,471); Malibu, CA
11/28/1997*	vs. Pacific; Big Island Invitational	L 48-55	1-3	15 – Daugherty	4 – Auriental, Vershaw	3 – Linton	Afook-Chinen Auditorium (N/A); Hilo, HI
11/29/1997*	vs. No. 18 Oklahoma; Big Island Invitational	W 75-64	2-3	17 – Mason	5 – Mason	6 – Burkemper	Afook-Chinen Auditorium (N/A); Hilo, HI
11/30/1997*	vs. Montana; Big Island Invitational	W 78-61	3-3	19 – Auriental	6 – Vershaw	5 – Okey	Afook-Chinen Auditorium (N/A); Hilo, HI
12/6/1997*	No. 20 Temple	L 49-59	3-4	18 – Mason, Vershaw	10 – Okey	3 – Auriental	UW Field House (11,500); Madison, WI
12/9/1997*	Toledo	W 73-68 ^{OT}	4-4	19 – Mason	6 – Kowske	5 – Kelley	UW Field House (10,787); Madison, WI
12/13/1997*	at Ball State	L 56-68	4-5	13 – Duany	10 – Daugherty	3 – Vershaw	University Arena (7,900); Muncie, IN
12/20/1997*	Coppin State	W 71-63	5-5	20 – Duany	8 – Auriental, Duany	7 – Auriental	UW Field House (11,500); Madison, WI
12/23/1997*	Nevada	W 62-53	6-5	14 – Mason, Okey	7 – Kowske	3 – Vershaw	UW Field House (11,500); Madison, WI
12/27/1997*	at Fresno State	W 64-60	7-5	17 – Mason	10 – Kowske	6 – Okey	Selland Arena (10,220); Fresno, CA
12/31/1997	No. 18 Michigan	L 63-76	7-6 (0-1)	14 – Okey	6 – Okey	4 – Okey	UW Field House (11,500); Madison, WI
1/3/1998	at Ohio State	W 64-59	8-6 (1-1)	17 – Mason	8 – Coleman	4 – Mason	St. John Arena (9,005); Columbus, OH
1/8/1998	at Michigan State	L 40-63	8-7 (1-2)	8 – Kowske, Vershaw	8 – Daugherty	2 – Kelley, Okey, Vershaw	Breslin Center (15,138); East Lansing, MI
1/14/1998	Penn State	W 76-57	9-7 (2-2)	18 – Auriental	8 – Daugherty	3 – Auriental, Kelley, Mason, Vershaw	UW Field House (11,500); Madison, WI
1/17/1998	Northwestern	W 56-33	10-7 (3-2)	18 – Mason	4 – Daugherty, Kowske	2 – Burkemper, Kelley, Mason	Kohl Center (16,697); Madison, WI
1/21/1998	at Illinois	L 48-62	10-8 (3-3)	13 – Auriental	5 – Coleman, Daugherty	3 – Kelley, Vershaw	Assembly Hall (11,281); Champaign, IL
1/25/1998	Indiana	L 59-69	10-9 (3-4)	21 – Mason	11 – Daugherty	4 – Vershaw	Kohl Center (15,551); Madison, WI
1/27/1998	at Minnesota	L 48-58	10-10 (3-5)	24 – Mason	7 – Coleman, Mason	4 – Auriental	Williams Arena (14,354); Minneapolis, MN
1/31/1998	at No. 10 Purdue	L 59-82	10-11 (3-6)	16 – Daugherty	12 – Daugherty	5 – Burkemper	Mackey Arena (14,123); West Lafayette, IN
2/3/1998	No. 24 Iowa	L 76-79	10-12 (3-7)	14 – Mason	10 – Daugherty	2 – Burkemper, Vershaw	Kohl Center (16,096); Madison, WI
2/7/1998	Illinois	L 47-53 ^{OT}	10-13 (3-8)	16 – Daugherty	12 – Daugherty	2 – Auriental	Kohl Center (16,414); Madison, WI
2/11/1998	at Northwestern	L 39-47	10-14 (3-9)	9 – Vershaw	8 – Kowske, Vershaw	2 – Kelley, Mason	Welsh-Ryan Arena (3,947); Evanston, IL
2/14/1998	at Penn State	L 69-75	10-15 (3-10)	30 – Mason	9 – Daugherty	9 – Auriental	Jordan Center (11,514); State College, PA
2/18/1998*	UW-Milwaukee	W 65-58	11-15	24 – Mason	10 – Auriental	3 – Mason, Daugherty	Kohl Center (11,578); Madison, WI
2/21/1998	No. 14 Michigan State	L 47-56	11-16 (3-11)	14 – Mason	7 – Daugherty	3 – Auriental	Kohl Center (16,367); Madison, WI
2/25/1998	Ohio State	L 56-61	11-17 (3-12)	18 – Daugherty	11 – Daugherty	4 – Kelley	Kohl Center (16,042); Madison, WI
2/28/1998	at No. 21 Michigan	L 70-76	11-18 (3-13)	28 – Mason	7 – Linton	3 – Daugherty, Kowske	Crisler Arena (12,234); Ann Arbor, MI
Big Ten tournament
3/5/1998	vs. Penn State (7); Opening Round	W 52-51	12-18	17 – Mason	11 – Daugherty	4 – Auriental	United Center (21,711); Chicago, IL
2/21/1998	vs. No. 18 Illinois (2); Quarterfinal Round	L 61-66	12-19	24 – Daugherty	4 – Auriental, Kowske, Linton, Mason	4 – Mason	United Center (21,711); Chicago, IL
*Non-conference game. (#) Tournament seedings in parentheses.

== Player statistics ==
Individual player statistics (Final)
			Minutes		Scoring		Total FGs			3-point FGs			Free Throws			Rebounds								
Player	GP	GS	Tot	Avg	Pts	Avg	FG	FGA	Pct	3FG	3FA	Pct	FT	FTA	Pct	Off	Def	Tot	Avg	A	Stl	Blk	TO	PF
Mason, Sean	31	26	885	28.5	480	15.5	149	378	.394	54	161	.335	128	157	.815			106	3.4	46	14	13	96	87
Daugherty, Sean	31	28	818	26.4	336	10.8	125	282	.443	11	34	.324	75	105	.714			192	6.2	33	14	18	51	77
Auriental, Hennssy	29	19	759	26.2	209	7.2	72	205	.351	27	87	.310	38	53	.717			99	3.4	64	46	2	55	72
Vershaw, Mark	31	4	649	20.9	164	5.3	59	134	.440	4	10	.400	42	72	.583			83	2.7	52	10	8	45	48
Kowske, Andy	31	13	582	18.8	157	5.1	58	117	.496	0	0	.000	41	61	.672			120	3.9	14	10	18	30	71
Duany, Duany	29	3	422	14.6	130	4.5	48	150	.320	16	81	.198	18	27	.667			50	1.7	10	8	9	23	27
Kelley, Mike	31	29	868	28.0	129	4.2	44	108	.407	11	38	.289	30	38	.789			63	2.0	55	58	4	39	102
Coleman, Booker	30	15	432	14.4	109	3.9	37	64	.578	0	0	.000	35	63	.556			89	3.0	4	10	15	28	62
Okey, Sam	9	7	226	25.1	88	9.8	29	71	.408	5	12	.417	25	34	.735			44	4.9	23	8	5	18	31
Linton, Maurice	21	4	205	9.8	53	2.5	20	51	.392	1	3	.333	12	19	.632			29	1.4	8	0	2	18	17
Burkemper, David	31	6	384	12.4	22	0.7	3	18	.167	1	11	.091	15	23	.652			26	0.8	39	10	1	19	47
Vraney, Brian	6	1	11	1.8	0	0.0	0	0	.000	0	0	.000	0	0	.000			4	0.7	0	0	0	1	1
Chambers, Chris	7	0	11	1.6	0	0.0	0	1	.000	0	1	.000	0	0	.000			3	0.4	0	1	0	0	0
Total	31	-	6251	40.3	1877	60.5	644	1579	.408	130	438	.297	459	652	.704	316	680	996	32.1	348	189	95	431	
Opponents	31	-	6251	40.3	1940	62.6	643	1513	.425	197	553	.356	457	689	.663	323	711	1034	33.4	365	186	98	482	

Legend
GP	Games played	GS	Games started	Avg	Average per game
FG	Field goals made	FGA	Field-goal attempts	Off	Offensive rebounds
Def	Defensive rebounds	A	Assists	TO	Turnovers
Blk	Blocks	Stl	Steals	High	Team high

== Records ==
Sean Mason made the first field goal in Kohl Center history on January 17, 1998, vs. Northwestern.

A February 11, 1998 loss to Northwestern, in which he went 0-for-4 from beyond the arc, was the last game Sean Mason would fail to make a three-pointer in his Badger career. His streak of 39 straight games with a three-pointer began February 14, 1998 against Penn State and was a school record until being eclipsed by Bronson Koenig in 2016.
