= 1997–98 Minnesota Golden Gophers men's basketball team =

American college basketball season

1997–98 Minnesota Golden Gophers men's basketball

National Invitation Tournament, Champions (Vacated)
- Conference: Big Ten Conference
- Record: 20–15, 20 wins vacated (6–10 Big Ten, 6 wins vacated)
- Head coach: Clem Haskins (12th season)
- Home arena: Williams Arena

1997–98 Big Ten Conference men's basketball standings
	Conf.				Overall
Team	W		L	PCT	W		L	PCT
No. 16 Michigan State	13	–	3	.813	22	–	8	.733
No. 22 Illinois	13	–	3	.813	23	–	10	.697
No. 11 Purdue	12	–	4	.750	28	–	8	.778
Iowa	9	–	7	.563	20	–	11	.645
Indiana	9	–	7	.563	20	–	12	.625
Penn State	8	–	8	.500	19	–	13	.594
Northwestern	3	–	13	.188	10	–	17	.370
Wisconsin	3	–	13	.188	12	–	19	.387
Ohio State	1	–	15	.063	8	–	22	.267
No. 12 Michigan* †	0	–	5	.000	0	–	8	.000
Minnesota**	0	–	10	.000	0	–	15	.000
† 1998 Big Ten tournament winner Rankings from AP poll *Michigan: 24 reg. season games including Big Ten Tourn. Champ.; 2 NCAA Tourn. games vacated due to sanctions against the program **Minnesota: 15 games including 5 NIT games and championship vacated due to sanctions against the program Disputed records: Michigan 25–9, 11–5; Minnesota 20–15, 6–10

The 1997–98 Minnesota Golden Gophers men's basketball team represented the University of Minnesota during the 1997–98 NCAA Division I men's basketball season. Led by 12th-year head coach Clem Haskins, the Golden Gophers won the National Invitation Tournament and finished with a 20–15 record (6–10 Big Ten).

== Roster ==
1997–98 Minnesota Golden Gophers men's basketball team
Players
Coaches

Pos.	#	Name	Height	Weight	Year	Hometown
G	3	Russ Archambault	6 ft 1 in (1.85 m)	185 lb (84 kg)	So	Sartell	Fort Yates, ND
G/F	5	Sam Jacobson	6 ft 6 in (1.98 m)	210 lb (95 kg)	Sr	Park	Cottage Grove, MN
F	20	Quincy Lewis	6 ft 7 in (2.01 m)	—	Jr	Little Rock, Arkansas
F	42	Miles Tarver	6 ft 8 in (2.03 m)	225 lb (102 kg)	Jr	St. Joseph Notre Dame	Oakland, CA
C	51	Kyle Sanden	6 ft 11 in (2.11 m)	230 lb (104 kg)	So	Lincoln	Thief River Falls, MN

Head coach

- Clem Haskins (Western Kentucky)

Assistant coach(es)

Legend

- (C) Team captain
- (S) Suspended
- (I) Ineligible
- (W) Walk-on
- Injured
- Current redshirt

== Schedule and results ==
Date time, TV	Rank^{#}	Opponent^{#}	Result	Record	Site city, state
Non-conference regular season
Nov 14, 1997*		Villanova	W 68–55	1–0	Williams Arena; Minneapolis, Minnesota
Big Ten regular season
Feb 28, 1998		Northwestern	W 59–54	13–14 (6–10)	Williams Arena; Minneapolis, Minnesota
Big Ten Tournament
Mar 5, 1998*		at Northwestern; First round	W 64–56	14–14	United Center; Chicago, Illinois
Mar 6, 1998*		vs. No. 12 Michigan State; Quarterfinals	W 76–73	15–14	United Center; Chicago, Illinois
Mar 7, 1998*		vs. No. 17 Michigan; Semifinals	L 69–85	15–15	United Center; Chicago, Illinois
National Invitation Tournament
Mar 11, 1998*		Colorado State; First round	W 77–65	16–15	Williams Arena; Minneapolis, Minnesota
Mar 16, 1998*		UAB; Second round	W 79–66	17–15	Williams Arena (14,045); Minneapolis, Minnesota
Mar 18, 1998*		Marquette; Quarterfinals	W 73–71	18–15	Williams Arena; Minneapolis, Minnesota
Mar 24, 1998*		vs. Fresno State; Semifinals	W 91–89 ^{OT}	19–15	Madison Square Garden; New York, New York
Mar 26, 1998*		vs. Penn State; Championship game	W 79–72	20–15	Madison Square Garden; New York, New York
*Non-conference game. ^{#}Rankings from AP Poll. (#) Tournament seedings in parentheses.
