= Robert Traylor =

American basketball player (1977–2011)

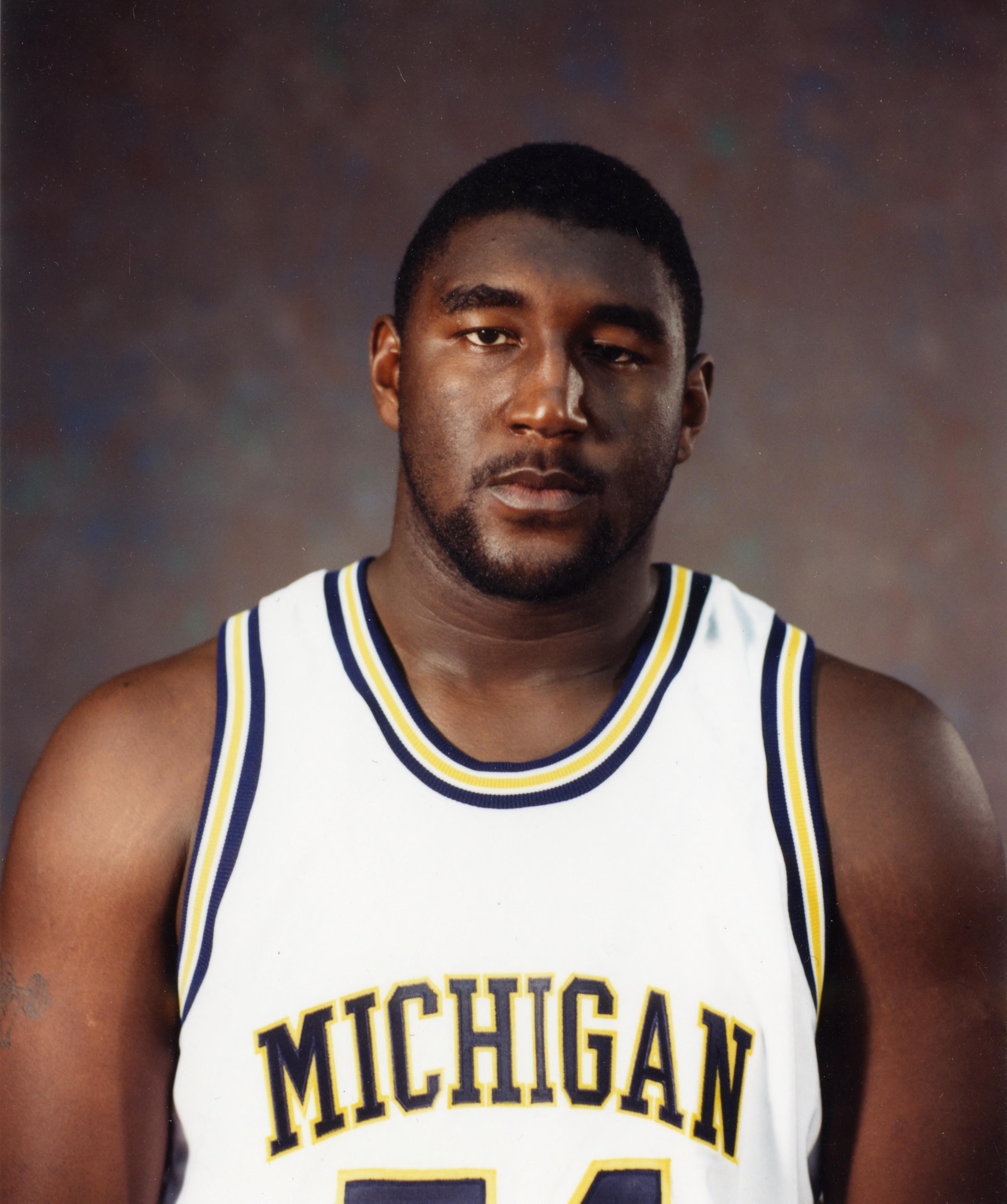
- Traylor in 1998

Personal information
- Born: February 1, 1977 Detroit, Michigan, U.S.
- Died: May 11, 2011 (aged 34) Isla Verde, Puerto Rico
- Listed height: 6 ft 9 in (2.06 m)
- Listed weight: 290 lb (132 kg)

Career information
- High school: Murray-Wright (Detroit, Michigan)
- College: Michigan (1995–1998)
- NBA draft: 1998: 1st round, 6th overall pick
- Drafted by: Dallas Mavericks
- Playing career: 1998–2011
- Position: Power forward / center
- Number: 54, 34, 32

Career history
- 1998–2000: Milwaukee Bucks
- 2000–2001: Cleveland Cavaliers
- 2001–2002: Charlotte Hornets
- 2002–2004: New Orleans Hornets
- 2004–2005: Cleveland Cavaliers
- 2006: Gestibérica Vigo
- 2007–2008: Santurce Crabbers
- 2008–2009: Antalya Kepez Belediyesi
- 2009: NSB Napoli
- 2010: Vaqueros de Bayamón
- 2010–2011: Halcones UV Xalapa
- 2011: Vaqueros de Bayamón

Career highlights
- BSN champion (2007); Third-team All-American – NABC (1998); NIT champion (1997)*; NIT Most Valuable Player (1997)*; McDonald's All-American (1995); First-team Parade All-American (1995); Mr. Basketball of Michigan (1995); * indicates awards retroactively forfeited

Career NBA statistics
- Points: 2,085 (4.8 ppg)
- Rebounds: 1,640 (3.7 rpg)
- Blocks: 306 (0.7 bpg)
- Stats at NBA.com
- Stats at Basketball Reference
Medals
Men's basketball
Representing United States
FIBA Americas U18 Championship
Gold medal – first place	1994 Santa Rosa	Team competition

Robert DeShaun "Tractor" Traylor (February 1, 1977 – May 11, 2011) was an American professional basketball player. He got his nickname because of his hulking frame. Traylor was the sixth pick in the 1998 NBA draft and played seven seasons in the league (from 1998–1999 through 2004–2005). He averaged 4.8 points per game, mainly as a reserve center and power forward.

== High school and college ==
Traylor was a McDonald's All-American the same year as Kevin Garnett, Vince Carter and Paul Pierce. He attended the University of Michigan. Standing 6 feet 8 inches (2.03 m) and weighing in excess of 300 pounds (140 kg), he joined a frontcourt for the Wolverines that included Maurice Taylor and Maceo Baston in 1995. That year, Traylor broke a backboard while dunking in a game against Ball State. Traylor helped lead the Wolverines to the 1997 National Invitation Tournament title, and was named the tournament's most valuable player. His junior year was his best, as he averaged 16.2 points and 10.1 rebounds while leading his team to the inaugural Big Ten tournament championship and second round of the NCAA tournament as a three seed.

Traylor was one of four Michigan players whose ties to booster Ed Martin roiled the program. During his freshman year, Traylor broke his arm in a car accident while out with teammates and recruiting prospect Mateen Cleaves who eventually went to rival Michigan State, won the 2000 NCAA Division I men's basketball tournament and was named the Most Outstanding Player. That accident triggered a six-year investigation into the Wolverine program. Martin pleaded guilty in 2002 to conspiracy to launder money and told federal prosecutors he took gambling money, combined it with other funds and gave Traylor, Chris Webber and two other Wolverine players a $616,000 loan. Traylor received three years' probation for tax fraud.

Due to NCAA violations connected to the case (principally the compromising of the amateur status of Traylor, Webber and Taylor), Michigan withdrew from consideration for the 2003 NCAA tournament, lost scholarships and was placed on probation. The school also vacated the records of every game in which Traylor played from its record book. Traylor also had to surrender his MVP award for the 1997 NIT, as well as his MVP award from the 1998 Big Ten tournament. Murray-Wright High School in Detroit, where Traylor played high school basketball, voluntarily forfeited its entire 1994–95 season (Traylor's senior season).

== NBA career ==
In the 1998 NBA draft, Traylor was drafted by the Dallas Mavericks in the first round (with the sixth pick), then traded to the Milwaukee Bucks for Pat Garrity and German prospect Dirk Nowitzki. Landon Buford of Sports Illustrated ranked this trade as one of the most lopsided trades in NBA history, while Dave Zirin of The Nation ranked it the most lopsided trade in NBA history. Nowitzki "would go on to have a distinguished 21-year career where he was an All-Star 14 times, a member of the All-NBA team 12 times, a league and Finals MVP, and an NBA champion in 2011", while Traylor struggled in the NBA. (In addition, Garrity was traded to Phoenix by the Mavericks for future Hall of Famer Steve Nash).

In the 2005 offseason, Traylor had surgery on his aorta. He then signed on with the New Jersey Nets for the 2005–06 NBA season, but—due to his failing a physical examination—the deal was scrapped. Traylor battled weight problems throughout his career. During seven NBA seasons, Traylor played for the Bucks, the Cleveland Cavaliers, Charlotte Hornets and the New Orleans Hornets. He averaged 4.8 points and 3.7 rebounds per game.

== International career ==
Traylor played in Turkey for Antalya Kepez Belediyesi, in Italy with the Lega Basket Serie A club NSB Napoli, in Mexico for Halcones UV Xalapa, and in Puerto Rico with the Cangrejeros de Santurce and Vaqueros de Bayamón. Traylor was selected as 2010 Defensive Player of the Year of Baloncesto Superior Nacional. Traylor's last game was played on April 26, 2011.

== Career statistics ==
=== College ===
Legend
GP	Games played	GS	Games started	MPG	Minutes per game
FG%	Field goal percentage	3P%	3-point field goal percentage	FT%	Free throw percentage
RPG	Rebounds per game	APG	Assists per game	SPG	Steals per game
BPG	Blocks per game	PPG	Points per game	**Bold**	Career high

Year	Team	GP	GS	MPG	FG%	3P%	FT%	RPG	APG	SPG	BPG	PPG
1995–96	Michigan	22	4	19.9	.554	.000	.548	5.9	0.5	0.9	0.7	9.0
1996–97	Michigan	**35**	**35**	27.3	.556	.000	.455	7.7	0.9	1.1	1.0	13.1
1997–98	Michigan	34	34	**32.1**	**.579**	.000	**.642**	**10.1**	**2.6**	**1.3**	**1.4**	**16.2**
Career		91	73	27.3	.566	.000	.545	8.2	1.5	1.1	1.1	13.3

=== NBA ===
==== Regular season ====
Year	Team	GP	GS	MPG	FG%	3P%	FT%	RPG	APG	SPG	BPG	PPG
1998–99	Milwaukee	49	**43**	16.0	**.537**	.000	.538	3.7	0.8	**0.9**	0.9	5.3
1999–00	Milwaukee	44	16	10.2	.475	.000	.603	2.6	0.5	0.6	0.6	3.6
2000–01	Cleveland	70	7	17.3	.497	.000	.567	4.3	**0.9**	0.7	**1.1**	**5.7**
2001–02	Charlotte	61	1	11.1	.426	**1.000**	.631	3.1	0.6	0.4	0.6	3.7
2002–03	New Orleans	69	0	12.3	.443	.333	**.648**	3.8	0.7	0.7	0.5	3.9
2003–04	New Orleans	71	0	13.3	.505	.400	.547	3.7	0.6	0.5	0.5	5.1
2004–05	Cleveland	**74**	6	**17.9**	.444	.000	.539	**4.5**	0.8	0.7	0.7	5.5
Career		438	73	14.3	.474	.167	.577	3.7	0.7	0.6	0.7	4.8

==== Playoffs ====
Year	Team	GP	GS	MPG	FG%	3P%	FT%	RPG	APG	SPG	BPG	PPG
1998–99	Milwaukee	3	**1**	15.0	**.778**	.000	.500	4.0	0.7	0.7	**1.3**	**5.3**
1999–00	Milwaukee	1	0	4.0	.000	.000	.000	2.0	**1.0**	0.0	1.0	0.0
2001–02	Charlotte	**8**	0	7.8	.350	.000	**.667**	2.0	0.4	0.3	0.3	2.3
2002–03	New Orleans	6	0	**15.7**	.455	.000	.250	**5.0**	0.7	0.5	0.8	3.5
2003–04	New Orleans	4	0	10.0	.444	.000	**.667**	2.5	0.3	**0.8**	0.3	2.5
Career		22	1	11.1	.459	.000	.529	3.2	0.5	0.5	0.6	3.0

== Personal life and death ==
In 2007, Traylor pleaded guilty to tax evasion and was sentenced to three years' probation.

On May 11, 2011, Traylor had been talking to his wife Raye on the phone; the connection was suddenly lost, so she alerted team officials to investigate. Traylor was found dead at his apartment in Isla Verde, Puerto Rico, of an apparent massive heart attack. He was survived by Raye and his two sons at the time of his death.

Former coach Paul Silas commented on Traylor's death, saying, "It's just a shock and hard to believe."

== See also ==
- List of basketball players who died during their careers

== Further information ==
- Enlund, Tom. "Lighter Traylor still big on talent." Milwaukee Journal-Sentinel. Thursday June 25, 1998. 3C. Google News 193 of 205.
- "Michigan's Traylor is turning professional." St. Louis Post-Dispatch. March 28, 1998. Page 13.
