= Brian Ellerbe =

American basketball coach

Biographical details
- Born: September 1, 1963 (age 63); Seat Pleasant, Maryland, U.S.

Playing career
- 1981–1985: Rutgers
- Position: Guard

Coaching career (HC unless noted)
- 1985–1986: Rutgers (GA)
- 1986–1988: Bowling Green (assistant)
- 1988–1989: George Mason (assistant)
- 1989–1990: South Carolina (assistant)
- 1990–1994: Virginia (assistant)
- 1994–1997: Loyola (MD)
- 1997–2001: Michigan
- 2009–2010: George Washington (assistant)
- 2010–2013: DePaul (assistant)
- 2015–2019: Morgan State (assistant)

Head coaching record
- Overall: 95-97

Accomplishments and honors

Championships
- Big Ten tournament (1998)

Brian Hersholt Ellerbe (born September 1, 1963) is an American basketball coach. The Seat Pleasant, Maryland native served as head men's basketball coach at Loyola College in Maryland—now known as Loyola University Maryland—from 1994 to 1997 and the University of Michigan from 1997 to 2001.

== Career ==
Ellerbe attended Bowie High School in Bowie, Maryland. He was a four-year starter at Rutgers University from 1981 to 1985. Ellerbe played in the backcourt at Rutgers with John Battle for Tom Young.

Ellerbe served as a graduate assistant at Rutgers in the 1985–86 season, before becoming an assistant coach at Bowling Green for two seasons. In the 1988–89 season, Ellerbe was an assistant coach at George Mason University, then at South Carolina the next season. From 1990 to 1994, Ellerbe was an assistant at Virginia.

Ellerbe became head coach at Loyola University Maryland in 1994. In three seasons, Ellerbe turned the team from 9–18 to 13–14.

From 1997 to 2001, Ellerbe was head coach at the University of Michigan. Ellerbe led Michigan to an appearance in the 1998 NCAA tournament and 2000 NIT. However, all of Ellerbe's wins in his first two seasons at Michigan were later vacated as a result of the Ed Martin scandal, in which four players received money from a booster. Following a 10–18 season, Michigan fired Ellerbe on March 13, 2001.

Ellerbe left coaching to become a consultant for youth and collegiate basketball programs. In 2005, Ellerbe became vice president for corporate development at Madison Grace Construction Services.

In 2009, Ellerbe returned to basketball coaching at George Washington under Karl Hobbs. From 2010 to 2013, Ellerbe was an assistant at DePaul on the staff of Oliver Purnell. In 2015, Ellerbe joined Todd Bozeman's staff at Morgan State.

In 2019, Ellerbe once again left coaching to become the athletic director at Archbishop Carroll High School (Washington, D.C.).

== Head coaching record ==
Record table
Season	Team	Overall	Conference	Standing	Postseason
Loyola Greyhounds (Metro Atlantic Athletic Conference) (1994–1997)
1994–95	Loyola	9–18	5–9	T–6th	
1995–96	Loyola	12–15	8–6	4th	
1996–97	Loyola	13–14	10–4	T–2nd	
Loyola:		34–47	23–19		
Michigan Wolverines (Big Ten Conference) (1997–2001)
1997–98	Michigan	25-9^{[Note A]}	11-5^{[Note A]}	^{[Note A]}	NCAA Division I Second Round
1998–99	Michigan	12-19^{[Note A]}	5-11^{[Note A]}	^{[Note A]}	
1999–00	Michigan	15–14	6–10	T–7th	NIT First Round
2000–01	Michigan	10–18	4–12	9th	
Michigan:		62-60	26–38		
Total:		62-60			
National champion Postseason invitational champion Conference regular season champion Conference regular season and conference tournament champion Division regular season champion Division regular season and conference tournament champion Conference tournament champion

^A. Due to NCAA sanctions, a total of 36 wins were vacated: 24 wins from the 1997–98 season, including 11 Big Ten regular season wins, three wins in the Big Ten tournament, and one win in the NCAA Tournament, and 12 wins in the 1998–99 season (including five Big Ten regular season wins). Michigan's 1998 Big Ten tournament championship was also vacated. Originally, Michigan finished fourth in the Big Ten in 1997–98 and ninth in 1998–99.
