= 1997–98 Indiana Hoosiers men's basketball team =

American college basketball season

1997–98 Indiana Hoosiers men's basketball

NCAA men's Division I tournament, Round of 32
- Conference: Big Ten Conference
- Record: 20–12 (9–7 Big Ten)
- Head coach: Bobby Knight (27th season)
- Assistant coach: Mike Davis (1st season)
- Home arena: Assembly Hall

1997–98 Big Ten Conference men's basketball standings
	Conf.				Overall
Team	W		L	PCT	W		L	PCT
No. 16 Michigan State	13	–	3	.813	22	–	8	.733
No. 22 Illinois	13	–	3	.813	23	–	10	.697
No. 11 Purdue	12	–	4	.750	28	–	8	.778
Iowa	9	–	7	.563	20	–	11	.645
Indiana	9	–	7	.563	20	–	12	.625
Penn State	8	–	8	.500	19	–	13	.594
Northwestern	3	–	13	.188	10	–	17	.370
Wisconsin	3	–	13	.188	12	–	19	.387
Ohio State	1	–	15	.063	8	–	22	.267
No. 12 Michigan* †	0	–	5	.000	0	–	8	.000
Minnesota**	0	–	10	.000	0	–	15	.000
† 1998 Big Ten tournament winner Rankings from AP poll *Michigan: 24 reg. season games including Big Ten Tourn. Champ.; 2 NCAA Tourn. games vacated due to sanctions against the program **Minnesota: 15 games including 5 NIT games and championship vacated due to sanctions against the program Disputed records: Michigan 25–9, 11–5; Minnesota 20–15, 6–10

The 1997–98 Indiana Hoosiers men's basketball team represented Indiana University. Their head coach was Bobby Knight, who was in his 27th year. The team played its home games in Assembly Hall in Bloomington, Indiana, and was a member of the Big Ten Conference.

The Hoosiers finished the regular season with an overall record of 20–12 and a conference record of 9–7, finishing 5th in the Big Ten Conference. After losing to Purdue in the quarterfinals of the inaugural Big Ten tournament, the Hoosiers were invited to the 1998 NCAA tournament. However, IU lost in the second round 78–68 to Connecticut.

== Roster ==
No.	Name	Position	Ht.	Year	Hometown
3	Charlie Miller	F	6–7	Sr.	Miami, Florida
4	Luke Recker	G/F	6–6	Fr.	Auburn, Indiana
12	Luke Jimenez	G	6–3	So.	Redwood Falls, Minnesota
21	Richard Mandeville	C	7–1	Sr.	Pasadena, California
23	Rob Turner	G	6–4	Jr.	Wilmington, Delaware
24	Michael Lewis	G	6–1	So.	Jasper, Indiana
25	A.J. Guyton	G	6–1	So.	Peoria, Illinois
30	William Gladness	F	6–8	Jr.	West Memphis, Arkansas
32	Robbie Eggers	F	6–10	Sr.	Cuyahoga Falls, Ohio
33	Larry Richardson	G	6–8	So.	Orange Park, Florida
35	Kirk Haston	F/C	6–10	RS Fr.	Lobelville, Tennessee
40	Jason Collier	C	7–1	So.	Springfield, Ohio
45	Andrae Patterson	F	6–8	Sr.	Abilene, Texas
53	Tom Geyer	F	6–8	RS Fr.	Indianapolis, Indiana

== Schedule/results ==
Date time, TV	Rank^{#}	Opponent^{#}	Result	Record	Site city, state
Non-conference regular season
11/14/1997*	No. 17	vs. No. 24 Temple	L 53–59	0–1	CoreStates Spectrum; Philadelphia, PA
11/20/1997*	No. 23	at Alabama-Birmingham	W 80–64	1–1	Bartow Arena (16,982); Birmingham, AL
11/28/1997*	No. 21	vs. Hawaii; United Airlines Classic	L 65–82	1–2	Special Events Arena; Honolulu, HI
11/30/1997*	No. 21	vs. Northeast Louisiana; United Airlines Classic	W 103–69	2–2	Special Events Arena; Honolulu, HI
12/3/1997*		Notre Dame	W 91–80	3–2	Assembly Hall; Bloomington, IN
12/6/1997*		vs. No. 7 Kentucky; Indiana–Kentucky rivalry	L 72–75	3–3	RCA Dome; Indianapolis, IN
12/9/1997*		Evansville	W 85–73	4–3	Assembly Hall; Bloomington, IN
12/12/1997*		Wisconsin-Green Bay; Indiana Classic	W 72–58	5–3	Assembly Hall; Bloomington, IN
12/13/1997*		South Alabama; Indiana Classic	W 64–56	6–3	Assembly Hall; Bloomington, IN
12/22/1997*		vs. San Francisco	W 65–62	7–3	The Arena in Oakland; Oakland, CA
12/27/1997*		vs. Southwest Missouri State; Union Federal Hoosier Classic	W 78–66	8–3	Market Square Arena; Indianapolis, IN
12/28/1997*		vs. Western Michigan; Union Federal Hoosier Classic	W 70–63	9–3	Market Square Arena; Indianapolis, IN
Big Ten regular season
12/31/1997		No. 14 Iowa	L 76–89	9–4 (0–1)	Assembly Hall; Bloomington, IN
1/3/1998		at Illinois; Rivalry	L 72–74	9–5 (0–2)	Assembly Hall; Champaign, IL
1/6/1998		No. 17 Michigan	W 80–62	10–5 (1–2)	Assembly Hall; Bloomington, IN
1/10/1998		Ohio State	W 83–66	11–5 (2–2)	Assembly Hall; Bloomington, IN
1/14/1998		at Northwestern	W 76–58	12–5 (3–2)	Welsh-Ryan Arena; Evanston, IL
1/18/1998		No. 9 Purdue; Rivalry	W 94–88	13–5 (4–2)	Assembly Hall; Bloomington, IN
1/25/1998		at Wisconsin	W 69–59	14–5 (5–2)	Kohl Center; Madison, WI
1/28/1998	No. 25	at No. 22 Michigan State	L 66–84	14–6 (5–3)	Breslin Center; East Lansing, MI
1/31/1998	No. 25	Minnesota	W 95–82	15–6 (6–3)	Assembly Hall; Bloomington, IN
2/4/1998		Penn State	W 95–76	16–6 (7–3)	Assembly Hall; Bloomington, IN
2/10/1998		at No. 8 Purdue; Rivalry	L 89–94	16–7 (7–4)	Mackey Arena; West Lafayette, IN
2/14/1998		Northwestern	W 73–55	17–7 (8–4)	Assembly Hall; Bloomington, IN
2/19/1998		at Ohio State	W 74–72	18–7 (9–4)	St. John Arena; Columbus, OH
2/22/1998		at No. 22 Michigan	L 64–112	18–8 (9–5)	Crisler Arena; Ann Arbor, MI
2/24/1998		No. 22 Illinois; Rivalry	L 72–82	18–9 (9–6)	Assembly Hall; Bloomington, IN
2/28/1998		at Iowa	L 70–84	18–10 (9–7)	Carver-Hawkeye Arena; Iowa City, IA
Big Ten tournament
3/5/1998	(6)	vs. (11) Ohio State opening round	W 78–71	19–10	United Center; Chicago, IL
3/6/1998	(6)	vs. (3) No. 9 Purdue quarterfinals	L 71–76	19–11	United Center; Chicago, IL
NCAA tournament
3/12/1998*; CBS	(7 E)	vs. (10 E) Oklahoma; First Round	W 94–87 ^{OT}	20–11	MCI Center; Washington, D.C.
3/14/1998*; CBS	(7 E)	vs. (2 E) No. 6 Connecticut; Second Round	L 68–78	20–12	MCI Center; Washington, D.C.
*Non-conference game. ^{#}Rankings from AP Poll. (#) Tournament seedings in parentheses.
