= 1997–98 Michigan State Spartans men's basketball team =

American college basketball season

1997–98 Michigan State Spartans men's basketball

Big Ten regular season co-champions Coca Cola Spartan Classic champions

NCAA tournament, Sweet Sixteen
- Conference: Big Ten Conference

Ranking
- Coaches: No. 10
- AP: No. 16
- Record: 22–8 (13–3 Big Ten)
- Head coach: Tom Izzo (3rd season)
- Assistant coaches: Tom Crean (3rd season); Stan Heath (2nd season); Mike Garland (2nd season)
- Captains: Antonio Smith; Mateen Cleaves
- Home arena: Breslin Center

1997–98 Big Ten Conference men's basketball standings
	Conf.				Overall
Team	W		L	PCT	W		L	PCT
No. 16 Michigan State	13	–	3	.813	22	–	8	.733
No. 22 Illinois	13	–	3	.813	23	–	10	.697
No. 11 Purdue	12	–	4	.750	28	–	8	.778
Iowa	9	–	7	.563	20	–	11	.645
Indiana	9	–	7	.563	20	–	12	.625
Penn State	8	–	8	.500	19	–	13	.594
Northwestern	3	–	13	.188	10	–	17	.370
Wisconsin	3	–	13	.188	12	–	19	.387
Ohio State	1	–	15	.063	8	–	22	.267
No. 12 Michigan* †	0	–	5	.000	0	–	8	.000
Minnesota**	0	–	10	.000	0	–	15	.000
† 1998 Big Ten tournament winner Rankings from AP poll *Michigan: 24 reg. season games including Big Ten Tourn. Champ.; 2 NCAA Tourn. games vacated due to sanctions against the program **Minnesota: 15 games including 5 NIT games and championship vacated due to sanctions against the program Disputed records: Michigan 25–9, 11–5; Minnesota 20–15, 6–10

The 1997–98 Michigan State Spartans men's basketball team represented Michigan State University in the 1997–98 NCAA Division I men's basketball season. The team played their home games at Breslin Center in East Lansing, Michigan as members of the Big Ten Conference. They were coached by third-year head coach, Tom Izzo. The Spartans finished the season 22–8, 13–3 in Big Ten play to win a share the regular season regular season championship. As the No. 1 seed in the inaugural Big Ten tournament, they were upset by Minnesota in the quarterfinals. MSU received a bid to the NCAA tournament as the No. 4 seed in the East region, marking the school's first appearance in the Tournament since 1995 and first under Izzo. They defeated Eastern Michigan in the first round which marked their first tournament win since 1994. They then defeated Princeton to advance to the Sweet Sixteen for the first time since 1990. There they lost to No. 1-ranked North Carolina.

== Previous season ==
The Spartans finished the 1996–97 season 17–12, 9–9 in Big Ten play to finish in a three-way tie for sixth place. Michigan State received an invitation to the NIT and beat George Washington in the first round. In the second round, they lost to Florida State.

The Spartans lost Jon Garavaglia (10.4 points and 5.9 rebounds per game) and Ray Weathers (13.6 points per game) to graduation following the season.

== Season summary ==
The Spartans began the season looking for their first trip to the NCAA tournament since 1995. They were led by sophomore Mateen Cleaves (16.1 points and 7.2 assists per game) and junior Jason Klein (11.2 points per game). This season marked the first year for all four of MSU's "Flintstones", Cleaves (sophomore), Charlie Bell (freshman), Antonio Smith (junior), and Morris Peterson (sophomore), who would end their careers with a National Championship in 2000.

The Spartans played one ranked team in the non-conference portion of the season, No. 7 Temple, and lost 56–54. MSU also suffered surprising losses to UIC and Detroit in non-conference. MSU finished the non-conference schedule at 7–3.

The Spartans opened the Big Ten season with a win against No. 4 Purdue. Following a loss at No. 17 Michigan, the Spartans won their next eight conference games before losing at eventual Big Ten co-champion, Illinois. In January, MSU entered the AP and Coaches rankings for the first time since the end of the 1994–95 season. The Spartans finished in a tie for the conference championship, their first since 1990, with a record of 13–3 in conference play. The Spartans earned the No. 1 seed in the inaugural Big Ten tournament, but lost their first game in the quarterfinals to Minnesota.

The Spartans received an at-large bid to the NCAA tournament as a No. 4 seed in the East Region, their first trip to the Tournament since 1995. MSU advanced to their first Sweet Sixteen since 1990 by beating Eastern Michigan and No. 8 Princeton. The Spartans were eliminated from the tournament by No. 1 North Carolina in the Sweet Sixteen.

As of 2025, no MSU team has failed to make the NCAA tournament, a streak which began with the 1997–98 team.

== Roster and statistics ==
1997–98 Michigan State Spartans men's basketball team
No	Name	Pos	Class	Height	Pts	Reb	Ast
14	Charlie Bell	G	FR	6–3	9.2	4.4	1.3
20	Steve Cherry	G	FR	6–6	0.2	0.4	0.0
12	Mateen Cleaves	G	SO	6–2	16.1	2.5	7.2
30	Doug Davis	G	FR	6–3	2.1	0.8	0.7
43	A. J. Granger	F	SO	6–9	2.6	1.8	0.5
34	Andre Hutson	F	FR	6–8	7.5	5.2	0.8
44	Jason Klein	G/F	JR	6–7	11.2	3.7	1.3
54	Ken Miller	C	FR	6–10	0.7	0.8	0.2
42	Morris Peterson	F	SO	6–6	8.0	3.5	0.9
13	Antonio Smith	F	JR	6–8	7.9	8.7	1.1
11	David Thomas	F	SO	6–7	3.5	3.8	0.8
55	Dujuan Wiley	C	SR	6–9	6.3	3.4	0.3

== Schedule and results ==
Date time, TV	Rank^{#}	Opponent^{#}	Result	Record	Site city, state
Exhibition
November 11, 1997*; 7:30 pm		Russia Aquarius	W 84–65		Breslin Center; East Lansing, MI
Non-conference regular season
November 17, 1997*; 7:30 pm		East Tennessee State	W 82–59	1–0	Breslin Center; East Lansing, MI
November 21, 1997*; 9:00 pm, ESPN Plus		at Illinois–Chicago	L 58–70	1–1	UIC Pavilion; Chicago, IL
November 28, 1997*; 6:00 pm		Central Michigan; Coca Cola Spartan Classic semifinals	W 89–61	2–1	Breslin Center; East Lansing, MI
November 29, 1997*; 8:00 pm		Gonzaga; Coca Cola Spartan Classic championship	W 70–68	3–1	Breslin Center; East Lansing, MI
December 4, 1997*; 7:30 pm		No. 20 Temple	L 54–56	3–2	Breslin Center; East Lansing, MI
December 6, 1997*; 7:30 pm		at Cleveland State	W 85–54	4–2	Wolstein Center; Cleveland, OH
December 13, 1997*; 7:00 pm, ESPN Plus		Detroit Mercy	L 65–68	4–3	Breslin Center; East Lansing, MI
December 17, 1997*; 7:30 pm		Wright State	W 95–52	5–3	Breslin Center; East Lansing, MI
December 20, 1997*; 5:00 pm, ESPN		at South Florida	W 68–53	6–3	USF Sun Dome; Tampa, FL
December 27, 1997*; 2:00 pm		Eastern Illinois	W 81–69	7–3	Breslin Center; East Lansing, MI
Big Ten regular season
December 30, 1997; 5:00 pm, ESPN Plus		at No. 5 Purdue	W 74–57	8–3 (1–0)	Mackey Arena; West Lafayette, IN
January 8, 1998; 7:30 pm, ESPN		Wisconsin	W 63–40	9–3 (2–0)	Breslin Center; East Lansing, MI
January 10, 1998; 2:30 pm, ESPN Plus Regional		at No. 17 Michigan; Rivalry	L 69–79	9–4 (2–1)	Crisler Center; Ann Arbor, MI
January 14, 1998; 8:00 pm, ESPN Plus		at Minnesota	W 74–60	10–4 (3–1)	Williams Arena; Minneapolis, MN
January 17, 1998; 12:15 pm, ESPN Plus Regional		Illinois	W 68–64	11–4 (4–1)	Breslin Center; East Lansing, MI
January 21, 1998; 8:00 pm, ESPN Plus		at No. 10 Iowa	W 78–57	12–4 (5–1)	Carver–Hawkeye Arena; Iowa City, IA
January 24, 1998; 12:15 pm, ESPN Plus Regional		Penn State	W 71–59	13–4 (6–1)	Breslin Center; East Lansing, MI
Jan 28, 1998; 8:00 pm, ESPN Plus	No. 22	No. 25 Indiana	W 84–66	14–4 (7–1)	Breslin Center; East Lansing, MI
January 31, 1998; 8:00 pm, ESPN Plus	No. 22	at Northwestern	W 72–66 ^{OT}	14–4 (8–1)	Welsh-Ryan Arena; Evanston, IL
February 4, 1998; 8:00 pm, ESPN Plus	No. 16	at Ohio State	W 84–58	16–4 (9–1)	St. John Arena; Columbus, OH
February 7, 1998; 12:00 pm, ESPN Plus Regional	No. 16	No. 24 Iowa	W 75–64	17–4 (10–1)	Breslin Center; East Lansing, MI
February 12, 1998; 8:00 pm, ESPN Plus	No. 13	at Illinois	L 63–84	17–5 (10–2)	Assembly Hall; Champaign, IL
February 14, 1998; 8:00 pm, ESPN Plus	No. 10	Minnesota	W 71–59	18–5 (11–2)	Breslin Center; East Lansing, MI
February 17, 1998; 7:30 pm, ESPN	No. 14	No. 22 Michigan; Rivalry	W 80-75	19–5 (12–2)	Breslin Center; East Lansing, MI
February 21, 1998; 2:30 pm, ESPN Plus Regional	No. 14	at Wisconsin	W 56–47	20–5 (13–2)	Kohl Center; Madison, WI
March 1, 1998; 2:00 pm, CBS	No. 10	No. 11 Purdue	L 96–99 ^{OT}	20–6 (13–3)	Breslin Center; East Lansing, MI
Big Ten tournament
March 6, 1998	(1) No. 12	vs. (8) Minnesota quarterfinals	L 73–76	20–7	United Center; Chicago, IL
NCAA tournament
March 12, 1998*; CBS	(4 E) No. 16	vs. (13 E) Eastern Michigan; First Round	W 83–71	21–7	Hartford Civic Center; Hartford, CT
March 14, 1998*; CBS	(4 E) No. 16	vs. (5 E) No. 8 Princeton; Second Round	W 63–56	22–7	Hartford Civic Center; Hartford, CT
March 19, 1998*; CBS	(4 E) No. 16	vs. (1 E) No. 1 North Carolina; Sweet Sixteen	L 58–73	22–8	Greensboro Coliseum; Greensboro, NC
*Non-conference game. ^{#}Rankings from AP Poll, (#) denotes seed within region. (#) Tournament seedings in parentheses. All times are in Eastern Time Source.

== Rankings ==
Ranking movements Legend: ██ Increase in ranking ██ Decrease in ranking
	Week																	
Poll	Pre	1	2	3	4	5	6	7	8	9	10	11	12	13	14	15	16	Final
AP												22	16	13	14	10	12	16

Source.

== Awards and honors ==
=== Mateen Cleaves ===
- Big Ten Player of the Year
- All-American Second Team
- All-Big Ten First Team

=== Tom Izzo ===
- AP Basketball Coach of the Year
- Henry Iba National Coach of the Year
- Basketball News' National Coach of the Year
- Big Ten Coach of the Year (Media and Coaches)

=== Antonio Smith ===
- All-Big Ten Third Team

=== Jason Klein ===
- All-Big Ten Honorable Mention
