= 1997–98 Illinois Fighting Illini men's basketball team =

American college basketball season

1997–98 Illinois Fighting Illini men's basketball

Big Ten Conference co-champion

NCAA men's Division I tournament, second round
- Conference: Big Ten Conference

Ranking
- AP: No. 22
- Record: 23–10 (13–3 Big Ten)
- Head coach: Lon Kruger (2nd season)
- Assistant coaches: Robert McCullum (2nd season); Rob Judson (2nd season); Steve Henson (1st season)
- MVPs: Jerry Hester; Kevin Turner
- Captains: Jerry Hester; Brian Johnson; Matt Heldman
- Home arena: Assembly Hall

1997–98 Big Ten Conference men's basketball standings
	Conf.				Overall
Team	W		L	PCT	W		L	PCT
No. 16 Michigan State	13	–	3	.813	22	–	8	.733
No. 22 Illinois	13	–	3	.813	23	–	10	.697
No. 11 Purdue	12	–	4	.750	28	–	8	.778
Iowa	9	–	7	.563	20	–	11	.645
Indiana	9	–	7	.563	20	–	12	.625
Penn State	8	–	8	.500	19	–	13	.594
Northwestern	3	–	13	.188	10	–	17	.370
Wisconsin	3	–	13	.188	12	–	19	.387
Ohio State	1	–	15	.063	8	–	22	.267
No. 12 Michigan* †	0	–	5	.000	0	–	8	.000
Minnesota**	0	–	10	.000	0	–	15	.000
† 1998 Big Ten tournament winner Rankings from AP poll *Michigan: 24 reg. season games including Big Ten Tourn. Champ.; 2 NCAA Tourn. games vacated due to sanctions against the program **Minnesota: 15 games including 5 NIT games and championship vacated due to sanctions against the program Disputed records: Michigan 25–9, 11–5; Minnesota 20–15, 6–10

The 1997–98 Illinois Fighting Illini men's basketball team represented the University of Illinois.

== Regular season ==
During the 1997–98 season, head coach Lon Kruger did the unthinkable as he took a team picked to finish seventh in the Big Ten and guided the Illini to a share of its first Big Ten title since 1984. On the way to the league crown, Illinois went 5–0 against Indiana, Iowa and Michigan, marking the first time in school history the Illini had gone undefeated against those teams during the course of a season. Illinois advanced to the second round of the NCAA tournament after earning a #5 seed in the West Regional. The Illini defense was the Big Ten's best as Illinois finished the year first in scoring defense, fieldgoal defense and three-point defense in conference games. Additionally, this would be the inaugural season for the Big Ten tournament, thus reducing the number of regular season conference games by 2, from 18 to 16. Illinois received 2nd seed for the tournament.

=== Roster ===
1997–98 Illinois Fighting Illini men's basketball team
Players
Coaches

Pos.	#	Name	Height	Weight	Year	Previous school	Hometown
F	00	Victor Chukwudebe	6 ft 7 in (2.01 m)	230 lb (104 kg)	So	Lanphier High School	Springfield, Illinois
G	4	Arias Davis	6 ft 2 in (1.88 m)	180 lb (82 kg)	Jr	Ware County High School	Waycross, Georgia
G	10	Jelani Boline	5 ft 10 in (1.78 m)	170 lb (77 kg)	Sr	Whitney Young High School	Chicago, Illinois
G	12	Jeff Reichardt	6 ft 1 in (1.85 m)	185 lb (84 kg)	So	Schaumburg High School	Schaumburg, Illinois
G	13	Cory Bradford (redshirt)	6 ft 2 in (1.88 m)	200 lb (91 kg)	Fr	Raleigh Egypt High School	Memphis, Tennessee
G	21	Matt Heldman (C)	6 ft 0 in (1.83 m)	165 lb (75 kg)	Sr	Libertyville High School	Libertyville, Illinois
F	23	Jerry Hester (C)	6 ft 6 in (1.98 m)	210 lb (95 kg)	RS Sr	Manual High School	Peoria, Illinois
G	30	Luke Williams	6 ft 2 in (1.88 m)	185 lb (84 kg)	Fr	Shiloh High School	Brocton, Illinois
G	31	David Freeman	6 ft 4 in (1.93 m)	220 lb (100 kg)	Sr	Champaign Central High School	Champaign, Illinois
F	32	Jarrod Gee	6 ft 8 in (2.03 m)	240 lb (109 kg)	Sr	St. Martin de Porres High School	Chicago, Illinois
G	33	Kevin Turner	6 ft 3 in (1.91 m)	170 lb (77 kg)	Sr	Simeon High School	Chicago, Illinois
F	34	Brian Johnson (C)	6 ft 7 in (2.01 m)	215 lb (98 kg)	RS Sr	Maine West High School	Des Plaines, Illinois
F	35	Carvell Ammons (redshirt)	6 ft 6 in (1.98 m)	205 lb (93 kg)	So	Centennial High School	Champaign, Illinois
G/F	40	Sergio McClain	6 ft 3 in (1.91 m)	230 lb (104 kg)	Fr	Manual High School	Peoria, Illinois
G/F	42	Awvee Storey	6 ft 6 in (1.98 m)	215 lb (98 kg)	Fr	Proviso West High School	Chicago, Illinois
F	44	Rich Beyers	6 ft 8 in (2.03 m)	230 lb (104 kg)	Fr	Shelbyville High School	Shelbyville, Illinois

Head coach

- Lon Kruger (Kansas State) (2nd year)

Assistant coach(es)

- Rob Judson (University of Illinois) (2nd year)
- Robert McCullum (Seminole State) (2nd year)
- Steve Henson (Kansas State) (1st year)

Legend

- (C) Team captain
- (S) Suspended
- (I) Ineligible
- (W) Walk-on
- Injured
- Current redshirt

Roster

== Schedule ==
Date time, TV	Rank^{#}	Opponent^{#}	Result	Record	Site (attendance) city, state
Non-Conference regular season
11/17/1997*		Bradley	W 69–59	1–0	Assembly Hall (13,304); Champaign, Illinois
11/15/1997*		Georgia Southern	W 82–53	2–0	Assembly Hall (10,789); Champaign, Illinois
11/24/1997*		Illinois-Chicago	W 71–70	3–0	Assembly Hall (10,789); Champaign, Illinois
11/27/1997*		vs. Wichita State; Puerto Rico Shootout	W 70–57	4–0	Coliseo Rubén Rodríguez (1,500); Bayamón, PR
11/28/1997*		vs. No. 19 Louisville; Puerto Rico Shootout	L 57–58	4–1	Coliseo Rubén Rodríguez (1,500); Bayamón, PR
11/29/1997*		vs. St. John's; Puerto Rico Shootout	L 66–83	4–2	Coliseo Rubén Rodríguez (500); Bayamón, PR
12/2/1997*		Texas-Pan American	W 88–60	5–2	Assembly Hall (10,456); Champaign, Illinois
12/6/1997*		at St. Louis	L 51–57	5–3	TWA Dome (32,429); St. Louis, Missouri
12/8/1997*		Maine	W 88–69	6–3	Assembly Hall (10,742); Champaign, Illinois
12/13/1997*		No. 17 Clemson	W 71–61	7–3	United Center (9,282); Chicago
12/20/1997*		Texas	W 105–80	8–3	Assembly Hall (14,746); Champaign, Illinois
12/23/1997*		vs. Missouri; Braggin' Rights	L 69–75	8–4	Scottrade Center (22,371); St. Louis, Missouri
12/30/1997*		at No. 9 UCLA	L 69–74	8–5	Pauley Pavilion (12,055); Los Angeles
Big Ten regular season
1/3/1998		Indiana; Rivalry	W 74–72	9–5 (1–0)	Assembly Hall (16,450); Champaign, Illinois
1/8/1998		at Iowa; Rivalry	W 76–64	10–5 (2–0)	Carver–Hawkeye Arena (15,500); Iowa City, Iowa
1/10/1998		at Northwestern; Rivalry	W 59–44	11–5 (3–0)	Welsh-Ryan Arena (8,117); Evanston, Illinois
1/13/1998		No. 9 Purdue	L 58–68	11–6 (3–1)	Assembly Hall (14,874); Champaign, Illinois
1/17/1998		at Michigan State	L 64–68	11–7 (3–2)	Breslin Student Events Center (14,874); East Lansing, Michigan
1/21/1998		Wisconsin	W 62–48	12–7 (4–2)	Assembly Hall (11,281); Champaign, Illinois
1/25/1998		No. 16 Michigan	W 64–53	13–7 (5–2)	Assembly Hall (16,450); Champaign, Illinois
1/28/1998		at Ohio State	W 66–62	14–7 (6–2)	St. John Arena (9,250); Columbus, Ohio
1/31/1998		at Penn State	W 77–71	15–7 (7–2)	Bryce Jordan Center (12,977); University Park, Pennsylvania
2/4/1998		Minnesota	W 68–56	16–7 (8–2)	Assembly Hall (12,204); Champaign, Illinois
2/7/1998		at Wisconsin	W 53–47 ^{ot}	17–7 (9–2)	Kohl Center (16,414); Madison, Wisconsin
2/12/1998		No. 13 Michigan State	W 84–63	18–7 (10–2)	Assembly Hall (16,450); Champaign, Illinois
2/14/1998		at No. 8 Purdue	L 72–75	18–8 (10–3)	Mackey Arena (14,123); West Lafayette, Indiana
2/18/1998	No. 23	Northwestern; Rivalry	W 69–57	19–8 (11–3)	Assembly Hall (16,450); Champaign, Illinois
2/22/1998	No. 23	Iowa; Rivalry	W 79–72	20–8 (12–3)	Assembly Hall (16,450); Champaign, Illinois
2/24/1998	No. 22	at Indiana; Rivalry	W 82–72	21–8 (13–3)	Assembly Hall (17,103); Bloomington, Indiana
Big Ten tournament
3/6/1998*	(2) No. 18	vs. (10) Wisconsin; Quarterfinals	W 66–61	22–8	United Center (21,711); Chicago, Illinois
3/7/1998*	(2) No. 18	vs. (3) No. 9 Purdue; Semifinals	L 47–68	22–9	United Center (21,711); Chicago, Illinois
NCAA tournament
3/12/1998*	(5 W) No. 22	vs. (12 W) South Alabama; First Round	W 64–51	23–9	ARCO Arena (14,920); Sacramento, California
3/14/1998*	(5 W) No. 22	vs. (4 W) Maryland; Second Round	L 61–67	23–10	Arco Arena (16,402); Sacramento, California
*Non-conference game. ^{#}Rankings from AP Poll. (#) Tournament seedings in parentheses. All times are in Central Time.

== Player stats ==
Player	Games Played	2 pt. Field Goals	3 pt. Field Goals	Free Throws	Rebounds	Assists	Blocks	Steals	Points
Kevin Turner	33	137	78	76	105	91	2	44	584
Jerry Hester	33	146	40	74	175	49	8	28	486
Matt Heldman	33	30	67	98	97	131	0	42	359
Jerry Gee	33	115	0	49	175	23	29	32	279
Brian Johnson	33	83	0	66	147	78	17	29	232
Sergio McClain	33	38	4	28	103	54	9	40	116
Arias Davis	28	7	24	3	22	10	0	6	89
Victor Chukwudebe	33	25	0	10	110	1	19	13	66
Awvee Storey	17	24	0	6	32	6	5	5	54
Rich Beyers	21	4	0	6	18	3	0	1	14
Jelani Boline	28	0	0	8	10	16	3	0	8
David Freeman	19	3	0	1	5	0	0	1	7
Jeff Reichardt	1	0	2	0	0	0	0	0	6
Luke Williams	1	0	0	0	0	0	0	0	0

== Awards and honors ==
- Jerry Hester
  - Team Co-Most Valuable Player
- Kevin Turner
  - Team Co-Most Valuable Player

== Team players drafted into the NBA ==
Player	NBA Club	Round	Pick
