= 1997–98 Purdue Boilermakers men's basketball team =

American college basketball season

1997–98 Purdue Boilermakers men's basketball

NCAA tournament, Sweet Sixteen
- Conference: Big Ten Conference

Ranking
- Coaches: No. 9
- AP: No. 11
- Record: 28–8 (12–4 Big Ten)
- Head coach: Gene Keady
- Home arena: Mackey Arena

1997–98 Big Ten Conference men's basketball standings
	Conf.				Overall
Team	W		L	PCT	W		L	PCT
No. 16 Michigan State	13	–	3	.813	22	–	8	.733
No. 22 Illinois	13	–	3	.813	23	–	10	.697
No. 11 Purdue	12	–	4	.750	28	–	8	.778
Iowa	9	–	7	.563	20	–	11	.645
Indiana	9	–	7	.563	20	–	12	.625
Penn State	8	–	8	.500	19	–	13	.594
Northwestern	3	–	13	.188	10	–	17	.370
Wisconsin	3	–	13	.188	12	–	19	.387
Ohio State	1	–	15	.063	8	–	22	.267
No. 12 Michigan* †	0	–	5	.000	0	–	8	.000
Minnesota**	0	–	10	.000	0	–	15	.000
† 1998 Big Ten tournament winner Rankings from AP poll *Michigan: 24 reg. season games including Big Ten Tourn. Champ.; 2 NCAA Tourn. games vacated due to sanctions against the program **Minnesota: 15 games including 5 NIT games and championship vacated due to sanctions against the program Disputed records: Michigan 25–9, 11–5; Minnesota 20–15, 6–10

The 1997–98 Purdue Boilermakers men's basketball team represented Purdue University as a member of the Big Ten Conference during the 1997–98 NCAA Division I men's basketball season. The team was led by Gene Keady and played its home games at Mackey Arena.

== Roster ==
1997–98 Purdue Boilermakers men's basketball team
Players
Coaches

Pos.	#	Name	Height	Weight	Year	Previous school	Hometown
G	3	Chad Austin	6 ft 2 in (1.88 m)	190 lb (86 kg)	Sr		Richmond, Indiana
C	14	Matt ten Dam	7 ft 2 in (2.18 m)	285 lb (129 kg)	Sr		Almelo, Holland
G	15	Alan Eldridge	6 ft 1 in (1.85 m)	195 lb (88 kg)	Jr		Fort Wayne, Indiana
G	22	Jaraan Cornell	6 ft 3 in (1.91 m)	200 lb (91 kg)	So	Clay	South Bend, Indiana
F	31	David Lesmond	6 ft 8 in (2.03 m)	205 lb (93 kg)	Sr		Pierrefitte, France
C	34	Luther Clay	6 ft 9 in (2.06 m)	210 lb (95 kg)	Jr		Oberlin, Ohio
F	35	Brian Cardinal	6 ft 8 in (2.03 m)	240 lb (109 kg)	So	Unity	Tolono, Illinois
F	52	Brad Miller	6 ft 11 in (2.11 m)	235 lb (107 kg)	Sr	East Noble	Kendallville, Indiana

Head coach

- Gene Keady (Kansas State)

Assistant coach(es)

- Bruce Weber (Milwaukee)
- Jay Price

Legend

- (C) Team captain
- (S) Suspended
- (I) Ineligible
- (W) Walk-on
- Injured
- Current redshirt

== Schedule and results ==
Date time, TV	Rank^{#}	Opponent^{#}	Result	Record	Site city, state
Regular season
Nov 14, 1997*	No. 9	Long Island University	W 119–95	1–0	Mackey Arena; West Lafayette, Indiana
Nov 17, 1997*	No. 9	at Valparaiso	W 73–56	2–0	Athletics-Recreation Center; Valparaiso, Indiana
Nov 20, 1997*	No. 8	Northeast Louisiana	W 107–80	3–0	Mackey Arena; West Lafayette, Indiana
Nov 26, 1997*	No. 6	vs. UAB; Great Alaska Shootout	W 92–64	4–0	Sullivan Arena (8,700); Anchorage, Alaska
Nov 28, 1997*	No. 6	vs. UMass; Great Alaska Shootout	W 82–69	5–0	Sullivan Arena (8,700); Anchorage, Alaska
Nov 29, 1997*	No. 6	vs. No. 4 North Carolina; Great Alaska Shootout	L 69–73	5–1	Sullivan Arena; Anchorage, Alaska
Dec 3, 1997*	No. 6	vs. No. 7 Kentucky; Great Eight Classic	L 75–89	5–2	United Center (19,567); Chicago, Illinois
Dec 6, 1997*	No. 6	at Louisville	W 87–69	6–2	Freedom Hall; Louisville, Kentucky
Dec 12, 1997*	No. 8	Tennessee-Martin; Boilermaker Invitational	W 87–56	7–2	Mackey Arena; West Lafayette, Indiana
Dec 13, 1997*	No. 8	San Francisco; Boilermaker Invitational	W 107–82	8–2	Mackey Arena; West Lafayette, Indiana
Dec 20, 1997*	No. 8	vs. No. 10 Xavier	W 86–84	9–2	Market Square Arena; Indianapolis, Indiana
Dec 22, 1997*	No. 7	Florida A&M	W 118–77	10–2	Mackey Arena; West Lafayette, Indiana
Dec 27, 1997*	No. 7	Providence	W 81–79	11–2	Mackey Arena; West Lafayette, Indiana
Dec 30, 1997	No. 5	Michigan State	L 57–74	11–3 (0–1)	Mackey Arena; West Lafayette, Indiana
Jan 2, 1998	No. 5	at Minnesota	W 83–79	12–3 (1–1)	Williams Arena; Minneapolis, Minnesota
Jan 7, 1998	No. 9	Penn State	W 77–55	13–3 (2–1)	Mackey Arena; West Lafayette, Indiana
Jan 10, 1998*	No. 9	at Houston	W 86–53	14–3	Hofheinz Pavilion; Houston, Texas
Jan 13, 1998	No. 9	at Illinois	W 68–58	15–3 (3–1)	Assembly Hall (14,874); Champaign, Illinois
Jan 18, 1998	No. 9	at Indiana	L 88–94	15–4 (3–2)	Assembly Hall; Bloomington, Indiana
Jan 21, 1998	No. 12	Ohio State	W 82–71	16–4 (4–2)	Mackey Arena; West Lafayette, Indiana
Jan 24, 1998	No. 12	Northwestern	W 80–45	17–4 (5–2)	Mackey Arena; West Lafayette, Indiana
Jan 29, 1998	No. 10	at No. 19 Michigan	W 89–82	18–4 (6–2)	Crisler Arena; Ann Arbor, Michigan
Jan 31, 1998	No. 10	Wisconsin	W 82–59	19–4 (7–2)	Mackey Arena; West Lafayette, Indiana
Feb 7, 1998	No. 10	at Ohio State	W 107–75	20–4 (8–2)	St. John Arena; Columbus, Ohio
Feb 10, 1998	No. 8	Indiana	W 94–89	21–4 (9–2)	Mackey Arena; West Lafayette, Indiana
Feb 14, 1998	No. 8	Illinois	W 75–72	22–4 (10–2)	Mackey Arena (14,123); West Lafayette, Indiana
Feb 18, 1998	No. 5	at Iowa	L 69–88	22–5 (10–3)	Carver-Hawkeye Arena; Iowa City, Iowa
Feb 21, 1998	No. 5	at Penn State	L 63–74	22–6 (10–4)	Bryce Jordan Center; University Park, Pennsylvania
Feb 25, 1998	No. 11	Minnesota	W 87–83	23–6 (11–4)	Mackey Arena; West Lafayette, Indiana
Feb 28, 1998	No. 11	at No. 10 Michigan State	W 99–96 ^{OT}	24–6 (12–4)	Breslin Center; East Lansing, Michigan
Big Ten Tournament
Mar 6, 1998*	No. 9	vs. Indiana; Quarterfinal	W 76–71	25–6	United Center; Chicago, Illinois
Mar 7, 1998*	No. 9	vs. No. 18 Illinois; Semifinal	W 68–47	26–6	United Center (21,711); Chicago, Illinois
Mar 8, 1998*	No. 9	vs. No. 17 Michigan; Championship Game	L 67–76	26–7	United Center; Chicago, Illinois
NCAA Tournament
Mar 13, 1998*	(2 MW) No. 11	vs. (15 MW) Delaware; First round	W 95–56	27–7	United Center; Chicago, Illinois
Mar 15, 1998*	(2 MW) No. 11	vs. (10 MW) Detroit; Second Round	W 80–65	28–7	United Center; Chicago, Illinois
Mar 20, 1998*	(2 MW) No. 11	vs. (3 MW) No. 10 Stanford; Midwest Regional semifinal – Sweet Sixteen	L 59–67	28–8	Scottrade Center; St. Louis, Missouri
*Non-conference game. ^{#}Rankings from AP Poll. (#) Tournament seedings in parentheses. MW=Midwest.
