= 1997–98 Iowa Hawkeyes men's basketball team =

American college basketball season

1997–98 Iowa Hawkeyes men's basketball

Super Chevy Shootout Champions

National Invitation Tournament, First Round
- Conference: Big Ten Conference
- Record: 20–11 (9–7 Big Ten)
- Head coach: Tom Davis (12th season)
- Assistant coach: Gary Close
- MVP: Ryan Bowen
- Home arena: Carver–Hawkeye Arena (Capacity: 15,500)

1997–98 Big Ten Conference men's basketball standings
	Conf.				Overall
Team	W		L	PCT	W		L	PCT
No. 16 Michigan State	13	–	3	.813	22	–	8	.733
No. 22 Illinois	13	–	3	.813	23	–	10	.697
No. 11 Purdue	12	–	4	.750	28	–	8	.778
Iowa	9	–	7	.563	20	–	11	.645
Indiana	9	–	7	.563	20	–	12	.625
Penn State	8	–	8	.500	19	–	13	.594
Northwestern	3	–	13	.188	10	–	17	.370
Wisconsin	3	–	13	.188	12	–	19	.387
Ohio State	1	–	15	.063	8	–	22	.267
No. 12 Michigan* †	0	–	5	.000	0	–	8	.000
Minnesota**	0	–	10	.000	0	–	15	.000
† 1998 Big Ten tournament winner Rankings from AP poll *Michigan: 24 reg. season games including Big Ten Tourn. Champ.; 2 NCAA Tourn. games vacated due to sanctions against the program **Minnesota: 15 games including 5 NIT games and championship vacated due to sanctions against the program Disputed records: Michigan 25–9, 11–5; Minnesota 20–15, 6–10

The 1997–98 Iowa Hawkeyes men's basketball team represented the University of Iowa as members of the Big Ten Conference during the 1997–98 NCAA Division I men's basketball season. The team was led by head coach Tom Davis, coaching in his 12th season at the school, and played their home games at Carver-Hawkeye Arena. They finished the season 20–11 overall and 9–7 in Big Ten play.

== Roster ==
1997–98 Iowa Hawkeyes men's basketball team
Players
Coaches

Pos.	#	Name	Height	Weight	Year	Hometown
G	3	Jason Bauer	6 ft 3 in (1.91 m)	—	Jr	Hudson, Iowa
C	13	Guy Rucker	6 ft 11 in (2.11 m)	—	So	Inkster, Michigan
PG	20	Dean Oliver	5 ft 11 in (1.8 m)	—	Fr	Mason City, Iowa
G	23	Ricky Davis	6 ft 6 in (1.98 m)	—	Fr	Davenport, Iowa
G	24	Ryan Luehrsmann	5 ft 11 in (1.8 m)	—	So	Cedar Rapids, Iowa
F	25	Vernon Simmons	6 ft 6 in (1.98 m)	—	Sr	Simi Valley, California
G	30	Kyle Galloway	6 ft 6 in (1.98 m)	190 lb (86 kg)	Fr	Sioux City, Iowa
G	32	Kent McCausland	6 ft 3 in (1.91 m)	—	Jr	Waterloo, Iowa
PF	42	Ryan Bowen	6 ft 9 in (2.06 m)	—	Sr	Fort Madison, Iowa
F	44	J. R. Koch	6 ft 10 in (2.08 m)	—	Jr	Morton, Illinois
F	45	Darryl Moore	6 ft 2 in (1.88 m)	—	Sr	Chicago, Illinois
C	55	Greg Helmers	6 ft 10 in (2.08 m)	—	Sr	Palmer, Iowa

Head coach

- Tom Davis (UW–Platteville)

Assistant coach(es)

- Gary Close (Arizona State)

Legend

- (C) Team captain
- (S) Suspended
- (I) Ineligible
- (W) Walk-on
- Injured
- Current redshirt

== Schedule/Results ==
Date time, TV	Rank^{#}	Opponent^{#}	Result	Record	Site city, state
Non-conference regular season
11/14/1997*	No. 15	Chicago State	W 105–60	1–0	Carver-Hawkeye Arena; Iowa City, IA
11/16/1997*	No. 15	North Texas	W 112–64	2–0	Carver-Hawkeye Arena; Iowa City, IA
11/29/1997*	No. 14	Long Island	W 101–69	3–0	Carver-Hawkeye Arena (15,387); Iowa City, IA
12/2/1997*	No. 10	Drake; Iowa Big Four	W 90–60	4–0	Carver-Hawkeye Arena; Iowa City, IA
12/5/1997*	No. 10	Rice; Super Chevy Shootout	W 81–52	5–0	Carver-Hawkeye Arena; Iowa City, IA
12/6/1997*	No. 10	Weber State; Super Chevy Shootout	W 81–56	6–0	Carver-Hawkeye Arena; Iowa City, IA
12/9/1997*	No. 10	at Northern Iowa; Iowa Big Four	L 78–84	6–1	UNI-Dome (8,742); Cedar Fall, IA
12/13/1997*	No. 10	at Iowa State; Rivalry	W 60–59	7–1	Hilton Coliseum; Ames, IA
12/21/1997*	No. 15	at Puerto Rico-Mayaguez; San Juan Christmas Classic	W 96–37	8–1	(400); San Juan, PR
12/22/1997*	No. 15	vs. Southern Miss; San Juan Christmas Classic	W 82–58	9–1	(400); San Juan, PR
12/23/1997*	No. 15	vs. St. Bonaventure; San Juan Christmas Classic	W 81–67	10–1	(400); San Juan, PR
12/28/1997*; 5:00 pm	No. 15	Bucknell	W 91–52	11–1	Carver-Hawkeye Arena; Iowa City, IA
Big Ten Regular Season
12/31/1997	No. 14	at Indiana	W 89–76	12–1 (1–0)	Assembly Hall; Bloomington, IN
1/8/1998		Illinois; Rivalry	L 64–76	13–2 (2–1)	Carver-Hawkeye Arena (15,500); Iowa City, IA
1/21/1998; 7:00 pm, ESPN Plus	No. 10	Michigan State	L 57–78	15–3 (4–2)	Carver-Hawkeye Arena; Iowa City, IA
1/24/1998*	No. 10	at Missouri	L 79–80 ^{OT}	15–4	Hearnes Center; Columbia, MO
2/3/1998	No. 24	at Wisconsin	W 79–76	16–6 (5–4)	Kohl Center (16,096); Madison, WI
2/7/1998; 11:00 am, ESPN Plus Regional	No. 24	at No. 16 Michigan State	L 64–75	16–7 (5–5)	Breslin Center; East Lansing, MI
2/18/1998		No. 5 Purdue	W 88–69	18–8 (7–7)	Carver-Hawkeye Arena; Iowa City, IA
2/22/1998		at No. 23 Illinois; Rivalry	L 72–79	18–9 (7–8)	Assembly Hall (16,450); Champaign, IL
2/28/1998		Indiana	W 84–70	20–9 (9–8)	Carver-Hawkeye Arena; Iowa City, IA
Big Ten tournament
3/6/1998		vs. No. 17 Michigan; Quarterfinals	L 66–77	20–10 (9–7)	United Center; Chicago, IL
National Invitation Tournament
3/11/1998*		Georgia; First round	L 93–100	20–11	Carver-Hawkeye Arena; Iowa City, IA
*Non-conference game. ^{#}Rankings from AP poll. (#) Tournament seedings in parentheses.

== Team players in the 1998 NBA draft ==
Round	Pick	Player	NBA club
1	21	Ricky Davis	Charlotte Hornets
