= University of Michigan basketball scandal =

Incident involving University of Michigan basketball team

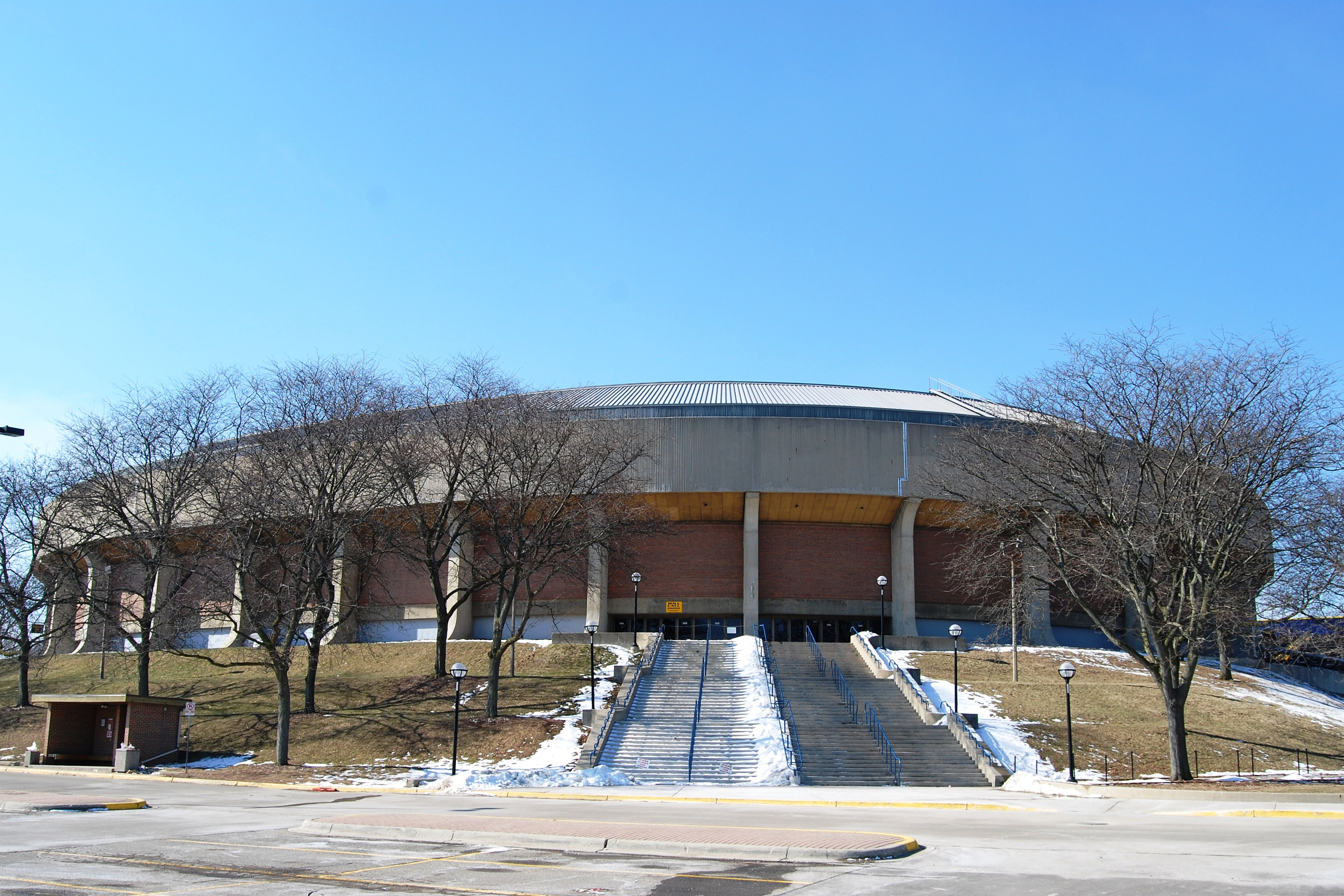
Crisler Arena is the home of Michigan Wolverines men's basketball.

The University of Michigan basketball scandal, or the Ed Martin scandal, concerned National Collegiate Athletic Association (NCAA) rules violations resulting from the relationship between the University of Michigan (or Michigan), its men's basketball program, and booster Eddie L. "Ed" Martin. The violations principally involved payments booster Martin made to several players to launder money from an illegal gambling operation. It is one of the largest incidents involving payments to athletes in American collegiate history. An initial investigation by the school was joined by the NCAA, Big Ten Conference, Federal Bureau of Investigation (FBI), Internal Revenue Service (IRS), and the United States Department of Justice (DOJ). As a result of this investigation, Michigan's basketball program was punished with sanctions.

The case began when the investigation of an automobile accident involving Michigan player Maurice Taylor revealed a curious relationship between Martin and Michigan's basketball program dating back to the 1980s. Several Michigan players were implicated over the next few years and by 1999 some were called before a federal grand jury. Four eventual professional basketball players—Taylor, Chris Webber, Robert Traylor and Louis Bullock—were discovered to have borrowed a total of $616,000 from Martin. During the investigation, Webber claimed not to have had any financial relationship with Martin, but eventually confessed to taking loans from Martin. He was both fined in the legal system and briefly suspended by the National Basketball Association (NBA) after performing public service.

In 1997, Michigan coach Steve Fisher was fired for his involvement in violations relating to the scandal. Subsequently, the NCAA investigation did not find him culpable of significant wrongdoing related to the scandal. By the fall of 2002, it was obvious that the four players were in fact guilty of taking money from Martin, and had thus compromised their amateur status. In response, Michigan placed the basketball program on two years' probation, withdrew from postseason consideration for the 2002–03 season, vacated all or part of five past seasons and removed the players' names and achievements from its record book. A few months later, the NCAA accepted these punishments, doubled both the probation period and the postseason ineligibility, penalized Michigan one scholarship for four seasons, and ordered the school to disassociate from the three living guilty players until 2012 (Webber's ban extended through 2013; the fourth player, Traylor, died in 2011).

The punishment cost the 2002–2003 team its postseason eligibility, cost past teams the 1997 National Invitation Tournament and the 1998 Big Ten tournament championships as well as appearances in the 1992 and 1993 NCAA Men's Division I Basketball Tournament Final Fours. It cost Webber his All-American 1993 honors, Traylor his MVP awards in the 1997 NIT and 1998 Big Ten tournament, as well as Bullock's standing as the school's third all-time leading scorer and all-time leader in free throws and the Big Ten's all-time leader in 3-point field goals (surpassed in 2011). The additional year of postseason ineligibility was overturned on appeal. Mandatory disassociations with the surviving players ended on May 8, 2013.

== Background ==
In the early morning of February 17, 1996, a Ford Explorer driven by University of Michigan basketball player Maurice Taylor went out of control while returning along M-14 from a party in Detroit, 40 miles (64 km) east of Michigan's campus in Ann Arbor. Among the passengers was high school star Mateen Cleaves, who was on his official recruiting visit. When an investigation revealed that the trip included a visit to the home of Michigan team booster Eddie L. "Ed" Martin, Michigan investigated his relationship with their men's basketball program.

Martin was reportedly returning to Ann Arbor from Detroit with Taylor, Cleaves, Bullock, Ron Oliver, Robert Traylor, and Willie Mitchell after a party that included drugs, strippers and alcohol. Accounts of the party vary. By some accounts the party was hosted by Martin, but by other accounts Martin's house was a stop on the way to a party at Detroit's Westin Hotel. Martin, a retired electrician who worked at Ford Motor Company's River Rouge Complex, provided all the players with money. A 2003 profile in ESPN the Magazine detailed how Martin operated a numbers game in the Rouge factory:

Winnings were based on state lottery numbers. Runners came around to collect the bets so that no one lost time on the Ford clock. And another worker doubled as the house. [...] With access to every part of the plant and all its potential bettors, Martin supplemented his electrician's salary with commissions he earned collecting bets. Slowly he climbed the numbers-runner ladder, using his position at the plant and the force of his personality to make him a natural choice as heir apparent to the whole operation. When the man who ran it retired during the '80s, the entire operation became Martin's, passed on as seamlessly as a mom-and-pop drugstore.

During the rollover accident, Traylor broke his arm and was lost for the season. Mitchell transferred from Michigan to the University of Alabama-Birmingham (UAB) after his junior season (1995–1996). Taylor, Traylor, Bullock, and Cleaves (who eventually signed with rival Michigan State) all went on to be drafted by National Basketball Association (NBA) teams. Bullock played in various foreign leagues but never in the NBA.

The NCAA uses a statute of limitations of four years. Thus, at any time the NCAA can open or re-open an investigation for an infraction occurring within the last four years. However, NCAA convention is to date violations based on when they learned about the infraction. Thus, events that had occurred far more than four years prior to the investigation came under its purview. The initial accident reports revealed several inconsistencies and violations that induced expanded investigation.

Michigan admitted to the secondary NCAA violation of transporting a recruit more than 30 miles (48 km) from campus. Questions were immediately raised about whether Taylor actually owned the vehicle involved in the crash. The NCAA asked for leasing documentation of Taylor's vehicle, and Michigan investigated the registrations of its players' vehicles. The university soon required that all the vehicles driven by its players be part of a special vehicle registration program.

== Martin's relationship with the program ==
In March 1997, Michigan and the Big Ten released the results of an investigation into Martin's relationship with the school. The investigation determined that Martin had nurtured a relationship that involved some minor violations. The violations that were published were that Martin was present at a recruit's home during a visit by head coach Fisher; and that he'd given a Michigan player a birthday cake. Fisher prevented Martin from committing serious additional violations by keeping him from placing a deposit on an apartment for a player. He also stopped Martin from buying airplane tickets for another player's family. A second October 1997 private investigation also failed to reveal any large violations.

=== 1980s ===
Martin befriended Perry Watson, coach for Southwestern High School of Detroit, and provided gifts to the team's players. When Michigan's Bill Frieder recruited a Southwestern High School prospect, Martin was present. Martin then began attending Michigan games with the prospect's father when the student enrolled. He also attended games and practices with Watson. Martin also developed a relationship with Iowa basketball coach George Raveling, who regularly recruited from Detroit high schools for Iowa. He also received complimentary tickets to Iowa games while Raveling was coach. Martin attempted to give gifts and cash to Frieder recruit Terry Mills. After Frieder left Michigan in 1989, Martin immediately formed an equally close relationship with his successor, Fisher, and gave Fisher's family gifts.

=== Webber ===
Martin noticed Webber during a middle school game. Martin attended Webber's church, where Webber's father was deacon and began fostering a relationship by making frequent visits to the Webber family home. Between 1988 and 1993 Martin gave Webber about $280,000. Eventually, Webber would confess to having received and repaid only $38,200, an amount identified via a specific transaction tied to Webber.

=== 1990s ===
In September 1996, athletic director Joe Roberson learned that during the previous month Martin had tried to place deposits on apartments for Traylor and Louis Bullock. Martin had also offered airline tickets to Bullock's parents so they could attend a tournament in Puerto Rico. It emerged that Fisher had known about Martin's actions at the time. While Fisher had ordered the deposits retrieved and made sure the tickets weren't used, he didn't tell anyone in the athletic or compliance offices, as he was required to do. As a result of Roberson's findings, he ordered interviews of the basketball team and team coaches.

The March 1997 Big Ten report showed that official University phone records documented that the coaching staff called Martin's home 39 times. Between the 1991–92 and the 1993–94 seasons, records showed that Martin received 97 tickets to Michigan basketball games either for free or under his special arrangement to have tickets made available for purchase. Watson joined the Michigan basketball coaching staff in 1991. The October 1997 investigation revealed that Fisher had provided Martin with passes for sixteen complimentary tickets from 1994 to 1997, and that his secretary and other clerical workers made out ten more such passes. In addition, six passes were signed with the PW initials of departed coach Watson. Watson denied making such passes available and a handwriting analysis matched five of the six to Fisher. Fisher was fired when the investigation became public on October 10, 1997, just a week before the start of basketball practices.

In June 1997, the Detroit Free Press revealed sources that claimed both Chris Webber and Taylor had received at least $100,000 from Martin, but that Webber had repaid the money after turning pro. A pattern of Martin befriending young basketball stars eventually became clear. Martin paid $280,000 to Webber from 1988 (when he was a ninth-grader at Detroit Country Day School) to 1993 (his sophomore year at Michigan, after which he turned pro). Martin also befriended Traylor as a freshman in high school. Martin was at Traylor's home when Fisher made a recruiting visit. Between 1994 (his senior year at Murray–Wright High School in Detroit) and 1998 (his junior year at Michigan, after which he turned pro), Martin gave Traylor about $160,000. Martin befriended Taylor when he was in high school. Between 1995 and 1998 (during his time at Michigan), Martin gave Taylor about $105,000. Since Bullock went to high school in Maryland, he did not know Martin before coming to Michigan. Martin gave Bullock about $71,000 during his four years at Michigan which ended in 1999.

Roberson also learned that during the 1992 Final Four, Fisher made two of the limited supply of team rooms available to Martin. Martin gave one hotel room paid for by Michigan to Webber's father—a violation of NCAA rules. For his part, Martin denied any wrongdoing when questioned by an NCAA enforcement representative. However, he later refused to cooperate with the University or the NCAA, forcing Michigan to ban him from any contact with the athletic program in March 1997.

== Raid and subpoenas ==
After the Michigan/Big Ten investigation and the private investigation, no serious violations arose. For example, Robert Traylor, Chris Webber, Jalen Rose, and Maurice Taylor were cleared in October 1997. In April 1999, the FBI and IRS raided several Detroit-area homes to stop a numbers game operation in the area's Ford plants. Martin's home was one of the targets; on April 28, he was found with a loaded gun, gambling records and $20,000 in cash in his home. The authorities were investigating Martin's alleged numbers game operation at Ford plants and whether Martin had provided Michigan basketball players with money and gifts. Another item that they seized was a Western Union MoneyGram from Martin to Traylor. In the course of a federal investigation, evidence turned up that Martin had given cash payments and other benefits to several Michigan players and Detroit-area high school prospects starting in the early 1980s. As a result of the investigations, in May 1999 a federal grand jury subpoenaed several Michigan basketball players to investigate the relationship between Martin and the basketball program.

Former Michigan basketball player Albert White was implicated in early investigations for having accepted US$37,000, but he was not named in later indictments. It was not clear how much of the money White received directly and how much was given to his friends and family to influence his decision to attend Michigan. Although White was one of several players captured on federal wiretaps and interviewed by both the FBI and IRS, he cooperated fully. Although he was not implicated, he transferred from Michigan to play for the Missouri Tigers men's basketball team after clashing with Steve Fisher.

== Federal indictments ==
=== Ed Martin ===
In late 1999, Martin originally agreed to a plea bargain in which he agreed to disclose information about the payments. The agreement with the United States Attorney's office, whose Assistant U.S. Attorney Richard Convertino led the prosecution case against Martin, was nearly finalized in January 2000. The paperwork for the plea agreement was to be finalized in March 2000 for the former Ford Motor Company employee to plead guilty to one count of federal gambling and one count of income tax evasion. He and his son, Carlton, backed out in May 2000, preferring to take their chances at trial due to the likelihood of light punishment for first-time offenders. Under the plea agreement in which they would have forfeited $100,000 and faced 6–15 months in prison, they would have been able to keep their homes. If found guilty at trial, they could have received up to 5 years imprisonment and a fine of $250,000 per count, but they would not have to agree to cooperate with the University investigation.

Less than a week after Martin backed out of his plea agreement, several former players were subpoenaed to testify before grand juries. In August 2000, Traylor and Bullock, by this time professional basketball players in the NBA and Italy respectively, were confirmed to have taken payments from Martin. Many of the payments came after the 1997 banning of Martin from contact with the team and the firing of Steve Fisher. The two players cooperated with federal authorities and admitted to receiving money. Traylor, Bullock, Webber, Rose and Taylor all testified before the grand jury. Fisher, a former San Diego State University coach, testified before a federal grand jury investigating Martin. Also testifying were former Michigan assistants Perry Watson, Brian Dutcher and Scott Perry. Martin and Watson had been close friends when Watson was head coach at Detroit Southwestern High School, with Martin often sitting on the bench along with assistant coaches. Perry, who had arranged Cleaves' recruiting trip, had known Martin since 1977 and coached under Fisher from 1993 to 1997. Many players and observers believed Martin was Watson's uncle, leading to Martin's schoolyard nickname of "Uncle Ed." Martin and Watson had a falling-out in the early 1990s, shortly after Watson joined the Michigan staff. Webber's father also gave sealed testimony before the grand jury.

On March 21, 2002—after almost three years of testimony—the grand jury returned an eight-count indictment charging Martin, his wife Hilda and their friend Clarence Malvo with running an illegal gambling business at the Ford River Rouge plant, money laundering and conspiracy to launder money. According to the indictment, Martin made illicit loans totalling $616,000 to Webber, Taylor, Bullock and Traylor to launder money from an illegal numbers game at Detroit–area auto plants. The loans were made with the understanding that they would be repaid once the players turned pro. Martin was indicted for having paid Webber a total of $280,000 between 1988–1993, which included time from Webber's freshman year at Detroit Country Day School in Birmingham, Michigan to his sophomore year at Michigan.

Martin, his wife, Hilda, and Clarence Malvo were under federal indictment for conspiracy to engage in illegal gambling and could have faced up to five years in prison and a $250,000 fine if convicted. Mr. Martin had also been charged with seven additional counts: having an illegal gambling business, conspiracy to launder money, three counts of laundering money and two counts of using money from illegal activities. The charge against Hilda Martin was dropped as part of a plea agreement. On April 8, 2002, Malvo pleaded guilty to grand jury perjury for testifying that he did not work for Martin. On May 28, 2002 Martin pleaded guilty to one count of conspiracy to launder money. He agreed to cooperate with investigations by the government, Michigan and the NCAA. The other seven charges against Martin were dropped in addition to those against Hilda. Furthermore, Martin was barred from associating with the team by a ban, which made any continuing financial relationship with him in violation of NCAA rules and to be considered a new violation.

=== Chris Webber ===
In September 2002, Webber was indicted on five charges, including obstruction of justice and lying to a federal grand jury, for having misrepresented his relationship with Martin. Each charge was punishable by five years in prison and a $250,000 fine. He vowed to fight the charges.

Martin pleaded guilty to running an illegal lottery at the Ford Motors plant he worked at to provide proceeds for the players. Martin testified that he paid Webber $280,000 in cash and gifts, but as of January 2003 Webber denied receipt of money from Martin and maintained that he had testified truthfully to a grand jury in 2000 on such matters. Martin stated that there was always an understanding that the money would be repaid after the players became professionals. In the 2000 grand jury investigation, Webber had been asked about whether his off-campus apartment rent had been paid by Martin and whether he had received spending money, jewelry, clothing or a stereo. Webber generally responded by saying either that he could not recall or that he did not think he had received such gifts. However, prosecutors say that Webber, after turning professional, gave Martin ''a significant sum of money, in cash, as a partial repayment.'' In December 2002, Webber's father admitted he had accepted gifts and a small loan from Martin, which contradicted earlier statements. Prosecutors also accused Webber's aunt of lying about a meeting she had with Martin in the updated filing.

Chris Webber, his father, Mayce Webber, and aunt, Charlene Johnson, were also indicted on charges of having lied to a federal grand jury regarding dealings with Martin. The University had attempted three previous investigations and was not successful at gathering enough evidence to proceed further until the federal government got involved. In January 2003, the federal prosecutors filed more detailed indictments against Webber and his relatives for obstruction of justice and perjury.

Ed Martin died of a suspected pulmonary embolism on February 14, 2003, at the Henry Ford Hospital in Detroit. He was awaiting sentencing at the time of his death. Malvo, who confessed to taking bets and paying off winning wagers for Martin, pleaded guilty April 8, 2002 to lying before a federal grand jury. He admitted to telling a grand jury in October 1999 that he bet money but did not work for Martin. He was sentenced in August 2002 to two years' probation.

Martin's death largely took the air out of the federal perjury case against Webber. In July 2003, on the day before jury selection in the case was due to begin, Webber pleaded guilty to the reduced charge of criminal contempt in order to avoid a possible jail sentence. He admitted to having received and repaid $38,200. The deal was subject to a discretionary fine and possible classification of the infraction as a felony by the United States District Court Judge Nancy Edmunds who would rule in September 2003. In exchange for the plea all other charges were dropped against him as were all charges against his father. The charges against Webber's aunt had been dropped after Martin's death.

== Sanctions ==
=== Self-imposed ===
By the fall of 2002, it had become clear that Michigan's basketball program was guilty of major violations. In response, Michigan decided to impose its own sanctions on the program. Initially, Michigan announced it would forfeit every game in which the four players appeared. On November 7, 2002; Michigan president Mary Sue Coleman and athletic director Bill Martin announced that the school was imposing sanctions of its own on the basketball program. Among them:

- No postseason play in 2002–03, even though the players who took Martin's money were no longer at the school.
- The school vacated the entire 1992–93 season and every game it played from the 1995–96 season through the 1998–99 season. This included the 1997 National Invitation Tournament title and the 1998 Big Ten tournament title. It also vacated its two Final Four games in 1992 and its entire NCAA tournament record in 1993, 1996 and 1998. There is a difference between forfeiting a game and vacating a game; a vacated game does not result in the other school being credited with a win. This included virtually the entire career of Fisher's successor, Brian Ellerbe. However, it did not include all games that Webber played or was eligible because all but the final two games of his freshman year were retained.
- Returning $450,000 received from the NCAA for postseason play in 1992, 1993, 1996 and 1998
- Banners commemorating the 1992 and 1993 Final Four runs, the 1997 NIT title and 1998 Big Ten tournament title would be removed from the rafters at Crisler Arena.
- Two years' probation.

Coleman described what happened as "wrong, plain and simple." She also said, "I am determined that nothing like this will ever happen again at Michigan."

At 8:00 A.M. that same day, the four banners were removed from the rafters. Four days later, the athletic department officially deleted all mention of Webber, Taylor, Traylor and Bullock from the school's athletic records. These included Traylor's MVP awards in the 1997 NIT and 1998 Big Ten tournament, as well as Bullock's standing as the Big Ten's all-time leader in 3-point field goals and the school's third all-time leading scorer and all-time leader free throws made. The deletions came because the payments may have compromised their amateur status. Several players not implicated in the scandal continue to be listed among the school's honorees such as Rob Pelinka (Walter Byers Scholarship, 1993), Juwan Howard and Jalen Rose (All-American, 1994) and Jerod Ward (Big Ten All-Tournament Team, 1998).

Michigan finished the 2002–2003 season with a 17–13 record but sat out both that year's NCAA and NIT tournaments due to the self-imposed postseason ban.

=== NCAA ===
On May 8, 2003, the NCAA accepted Michigan's sanctions. It also imposed an additional two years of probation and docked the school one scholarship a year from 2004–2005 until 2007–2008. It also ordered the school to disassociate itself from Traylor (who died in 2011), Taylor and Bullock until 2012, and Webber until 2013. The NCAA also barred Michigan from postseason play for the 2003–04 season (later overturned on appeal). Infractions committee chairman Thomas Yeager, who had come very close to imposing the "death penalty" on the University of Alabama football program a few months earlier, called the Martin/Michigan affair "one of the three or four most egregious violations of NCAA bylaws" ever. The disassociation meant that Michigan could not accept donations or recruiting assistance from any of the players for ten years. Webber's sanction ended on May 8, 2013. The NCAA criticized Fisher for allowing Martin access to the program, but did not sanction him. The University announced its intention to appeal the additional one-year suspension from post-season play. As a result of the sanctions, Ellerbe's successor, Tommy Amaker, received a two-year contract extension through the 2007–08 season to compensate for the duties while under probation, and Bernard Robinson had the right to transfer without sitting out a year because, as the only scholarship senior, the ineligibility extended for his entire remaining scholarship tenure.

=== Vacated and forfeited games ===
The following is the official NCAA record of affected games:

Season	Coach	Record as played	Actual adjusted record	Regular season Vacated	Tournament Vacated
1992	Steve Fisher	25–9	24–8	0–0	1–1
1993	Fisher	31–5	0–4	26–0	5–1
1996	Fisher	21–11	1*–10	20–0	0–1
1997	Fisher	24–11	0–11	19–0	5–0
1998	Brian Ellerbe	25–9	0–8	24–0	1–1
1999	Ellerbe	12–19	0–19	12–0	0–0

* The 1996 team gained 1 win by forfeit.

== Fallout ==
In September 2003, the NCAA reversed its decision to add a second year of postseason ineligibility after hearing an appeal by the University; the Wolverines went on to become champions of the 2004 National Invitation Tournament. Also in September 2003, Judge Edmunds deferred sentencing until she could monitor Webber's service of 300 hours of community service at a middle-school literacy program for two summers that she ordered. Also in September the University announced it sought $695,000 in restitution from Webber. Webber was the only involved athlete that the University sought restitution from in part because he was the only one who confessed to lying to a grand jury. Webber stated that he did not feel the University's request was appropriate because he had not stolen from the University.

During the 2003-04 NBA season, Webber was on the disabled list until February. When he returned, the NBA suspended him for three games for his guilty plea. In September 2005, Judge Edmunds ruled that the conviction should be treated as a misdemeanor and that Webber should pay the maximum fine for such an offense, which was $100,000. This ruling came after Webber served 330 hours of public service and accumulated $78,000 of related out-of-pocket expenses.

The Michigan High School Athletic Association (MHSAA), following the release of court testimony, requested that Webber's high school, Detroit Country Day (DCD), forfeit the three state titles won with Webber in the lineup (1989–91). DCD conducted its own investigation, then called a press conference on March 1, 2004, to announce there was no "credible evidence" Webber's amateur status had been violated. When the MHSAA gave them the option of forfeiting games Webber played they decided not to. Traylor's alma mater, Murray–Wright High School, forfeited its entire 1994–95 season—Traylor's senior year.

== Expiration of disassociation ==
The disassociations with Chris Webber, Maurice Taylor and Louis Bullock ended on May 8, 2013. (Robert Traylor, as noted above, died before his disassociation could end.) Former Michigan athletic director Dave Brandon had stated that he would have welcomed the opportunity to reassociate with the players: "I've never met any of those guys, and I am looking forward to meeting them,...If any of those guys are interested in meeting with me, that would be great." Both Bullock and Taylor immediately stated that they look forward to their re-affiliation with the university. At the stroke of midnight when the disassociation ended, Webber tweeted "OK!!!"

There were many vocal opinions on what should happen following the end of the disassociation. An article on Bleacher Report stated that the University should retire Webber's Jersey. When asked whether the National finalist banners would ever be rehung, University President Mary Sue Coleman said not during her tenure, but she noted that "Some day, I won't be president anymore, and maybe someone else will have a different view".

Webber made his first post-ban public appearance at the University of Michigan on November 3, 2018, when he was invited by football coach Jim Harbaugh to participate as an honorary captain for its game against Penn State; Webber was warmly received at Michigan Stadium. Of the experience, Webber said on NBA TV, "Tell you what, fellas, this was a great moment, in front of 100,000 people. I had goosebumps and chills, and definitely some watery eyes." Webber also spent time with the football program as its guest before the game. He did not meet with the Michigan basketball team or staff, but despite this, head coach John Beilein stated that "I think it was a great step in the right direction that he was here."

Ironically, after Mike Boynton was named Michigan head coach on July 10, 2026, his first scholarship offer was to class of 2028 Mateen Cleaves Jr. on July 12. There was no mention of a recruiting visit by Cleaves at the time.
