= 1997–98 NCAA Division I men's basketball rankings =

- Season: 1997–98
- NCAA Tournament: 1998
- Preseason No. 1: Arizona
- NCAA Tournament Champions: Kentucky
NCAA Division I men's basketball rankings


The 1997–98 NCAA Division I men's basketball rankings was made up of two human polls, the AP Poll and the Coaches Poll, in addition to various other preseason polls.

== Legend ==
	Increase in ranking
	Decrease in ranking
	New to rankings from previous week
Italics	Number of first place votes
(#–#)	Win–loss record
т	Tied with team above or below also with this symbol

== AP Poll ==
	Preseason	Week 1 Nov. 17	Week 2 Nov. 24	Week 3 Dec. 1	Week 4 Dec. 8	Week 5 Dec. 15	Week 6 Dec. 22	Week 7 Dec. 29	Week 8 Jan. 5	Week 9 Jan. 12	Week 10 Jan. 19	Week 11 Jan. 26	Week 12 Feb. 2	Week 13 Feb. 9	Week 14 Feb. 16	Week 15 Feb. 23	Week 16 Mar. 2	Final Mar. 9	
1.	Arizona	Arizona (0–0)	Arizona (1–0)	Duke (6–0)	Duke (8–0)	North Carolina (10–0)	North Carolina (12–0)	North Carolina (13–0)	North Carolina (15–0)	North Carolina (17–0)	Duke (16–1)	Duke (18–1)	Duke (20–1)	North Carolina (24–1)	North Carolina (26–1)	Duke (25–2)	Duke (27–2)	North Carolina (30–3)	1.
2.	Kansas	Kansas (2–0)	Kansas (4–0)	Kansas (6–0)	North Carolina (9–0)	Kansas (11–1)	Kansas (13–1)	Kansas (15–1)	Duke (12–1)	Duke (14–1)	North Carolina (18–1)	North Carolina (20–1)	North Carolina (22–1)	Duke (21–2)	Duke (23–2)	Arizona (24–3)	Arizona (25–3)	Kansas (34–3)	2.
3.	Duke	Duke (1–0)	Duke (2–0)	North Carolina (6–0)	Kansas (8–1)	Duke (9–1)	Duke (10–1)	Duke (10–1)	Utah (12–0)	Kansas (19–2)	Kansas (21–2)	Utah (17–0)	Kansas (24–3)	Arizona (21–3)	Arizona (22–3)	North Carolina (26–2)	Kansas (31–3)	Duke (29–3)	3.
4.	North Carolina	North Carolina (1–0)	North Carolina (3–0)	Arizona (4–1)	Kentucky (6–1)	Kentucky (8–1)	Kentucky (9–2)	Utah (11–0)	Kansas (17–2)	Utah (13–0)	Utah (15–0)	Stanford (18–0)	Arizona (19–3)	Kansas (26–3)	Kansas (28–3)	Kansas (30–3)	North Carolina (27–3)	Arizona (27–4)	4.
5.	Clemson	Clemson (1–0)	South Carolina (2–0)	South Carolina (3–0)	South Carolina (5–0)	Arizona (7–2)	Arizona (7–2)	Purdue (11–2)	Arizona (10–3)	Arizona (13–3)	Stanford (16–0)	Kansas (22–3)	Utah (18–1)	Utah (20–1)	Purdue (22–4)	Utah (22–2)	Utah (25–2)	Kentucky (29–4)	5.
6.	UCLA	South Carolina (1–0)	Purdue (3–0)	Purdue (5–1)	Arizona (5–2)	South Carolina (5–0)	Utah (10–0)	Kentucky (10–2)	Kentucky (12–2)	Kentucky (14–2)	Arizona (15–3)	Arizona (17–3)	UCLA (17–3)	Connecticut (21–3)	Utah (21–2)	Connecticut (24–4)	Connecticut (26–4)	Connecticut (29–4)	6.
7.	South Carolina	UCLA (0–0)	UCLA (0–0)	Kentucky (4–1)	Xavier (5–0)	Utah (9–0)	Purdue (9–2)	Stanford (9–0)	Stanford (12–0)	Stanford (14–0)	Kentucky (16–2)	Kentucky (18–2)	Connecticut (19–3)	Kentucky (21–3)	Connecticut (22–4)	Kentucky (24–4)	Kentucky (26–4)	Utah (25–3)	7.
8.	Kentucky	Purdue (2–0)	Kentucky (1–0)	New Mexico (5–0)	Purdue (6–2)	Purdue (8–2)	Stanford (7–0)	Arizona (8–3)	Connecticut (13–1)	UCLA (12–2)	Connecticut (16–2)	UCLA (15–3)	Kentucky (19–3)	Purdue (20–4)	Kentucky (22–4)	Stanford (23–3)	Princeton (25–1)	Princeton (26–1)	8.
9.	Purdue	Kentucky (0–0)	Xavier (2–0)	Xavier (3–0)	Utah (7–0)	Stanford (5–0)	UCLA (6–1)	UCLA (8–1)	Purdue (12–3)	Purdue (14–3)	UCLA (13–3)	Connecticut (17–3)	Stanford (18–2)	UCLA (18–4)	Princeton (20–1)	Princeton (23–1)	Purdue (24–6)	Cincinnati (26–5)	9.
10.	Xavier	Xavier (0–0)	New Mexico (4–0)	Iowa (3–0)	Iowa (6–0)	Xavier (6–1)	South Carolina (6–1)	Connecticut (11–1)	UCLA (9–2)	Connecticut (14–2)	Iowa (15–2)	Purdue (17–4)	Purdue (19–4)	Princeton (18–1)	Stanford (21–3)	Michigan State (20–5)	Ole Miss (21–5)	Stanford (26–4)	10.
11.	New Mexico	New Mexico (1–0)	Connecticut (3–0)	Utah (5–0)	Stanford (5–0)	UCLA (4–1)	Connecticut (9–1)	South Carolina (7–1)	Iowa (13–1)	Ole Miss (12–1)	Princeton (13–1)	Princeton (14–1)	Princeton (16–1)	New Mexico (18–3)	New Mexico (19–3)	Purdue (22–6)	Stanford (24–4)	Purdue (26–7)	11.
12.	Connecticut	Connecticut (2–0)	Fresno State (2–0)	Stanford (4–0)	UCLA (3–1)	Connecticut (8–1)	Arkansas (8–0)	New Mexico (8–1)	New Mexico (10–1)	Princeton (13–1)	Purdue (15–4)	Ole Miss (14–2)	New Mexico (16–3)	Arkansas (20–3)	UCLA (19–5)	Arkansas (22–5)	Michigan State (20–6)	Michigan (24–8)	12.
13.	Fresno State	Fresno State (1–0)	Clemson (3–1)	Connecticut (5–1)	Connecticut (7–1)	Arkansas (7–0)	Xavier (6–2)	Xavier (7–2)	Florida State (12–2)	Iowa (13–2)	Ole Miss (12–2)	South Carolina (13–3)	South Carolina (16–3)	Michigan State (17–4)	South Carolina (19–4)	Ole Miss (19–5)	TCU (26–4)	Ole Miss (22–6)	13.
14.	Stanford	Iowa (2–0)	Iowa (2–0)	Ole Miss (3–0)	New Mexico (5–1)	New Mexico (7–1)	New Mexico (7–1)	Iowa (11–1)	Ole Miss (10–1)	South Carolina (10–2)	South Carolina (11–3)	New Mexico (14–3)	Arkansas (18–3)	Stanford (19–3)	Michigan State (18–5)	South Carolina (20–5)	Cincinnati (23–5)	South Carolina (22–6)	14.
15.	Iowa	Stanford (0–0)	Stanford (1–0)	UCLA (2–1)	Arkansas (6–0)	Iowa (7–1)	Iowa (8–1)	Florida State (9–2)	Princeton (11–1)	New Mexico (11–2)	Syracuse (15–2)	Arkansas (16–3)	West Virginia (18–3)	South Carolina (17–4)	Ole Miss (17–5)	TCU (24–4)	South Carolina (21–6)	TCU (27–5)	15.
16.	Utah	Utah (1–0)	Utah (3–0)	Fresno State (3–1)	Florida State (6–1)	Temple (6–1)	Ole Miss (7–1)	Ole Miss (8–1)	South Carolina (8–2)	Syracuse (14–1)	Michigan (14–4)	Iowa (15–4)	Michigan State (15–4)	West Virginia (19–4)	Arkansas (20–5)	New Mexico (21–4)	Arkansas (22–7)	Michigan State (20–7)	16.
17.	Indiana	Charlotte (0–0)	Ole Miss (2–0)	Clemson (3–2)	Clemson (5–2)	Florida State (7–1)	Florida State (8–2)	Princeton (10–1)	Michigan (12–3)	Florida State (12–4)	New Mexico (13–3)	West Virginia (17–3)	Ole Miss (14–4)	George Washington (20–3)	Cincinnati (19–5)	Cincinnati (21–5)	Michigan (21–8)	Arkansas (23–8)	17.
18.	Charlotte	Temple (2–0)	Oklahoma (3–0)	Arkansas (4–0)	Fresno State (3–1)	Ole Miss (5–1)	Princeton (8–1)	Michigan (10–3)	Syracuse (12–1)	Xavier (10–3)	Arkansas (14–3)	Cincinnati (15–3)	Michigan (16–6)	Ole Miss (15–5)	UMass (19–6)	UCLA (20–6)	Illinois (21–8)	New Mexico (23–7)	18.
19.	Georgia	Oklahoma (1–0)	Louisville (0–0)	Florida State (4–1)	Maryland (4–2)	Princeton (7–1)	Syracuse (9–0)	Syracuse (11–1)	Xavier (8–3)	Michigan (13–4)	Xavier (11–4)	Michigan (15–5)	Syracuse (17–4)	Cincinnati (17–5)	TCU (22–4)	West Virginia (22–5)	UCLA (21–7)	UCLA (22–8)	19.
20.	Oklahoma	Rhode Island (1–0)	Temple (2–1)	Temple (2–1)	Temple (4–1)	Georgia (7–2)	Maryland (5–3)	Maryland (7–3)	Marquette (10–0)	Rhode Island (10–2)	Florida State (13–5)	Syracuse (15–4)	Cincinnati (16–4)	UMass (17–6)	West Virginia (20–5)	UMass (20–7)	New Mexico (21–6)	Maryland (19–10)	20.
21.	Rhode Island	Ole Miss (0–0)	Indiana (1–1)	Georgia (5–1)	Ole Miss (4–1)	Michigan (6–2)	Clemson (7–3)	Clemson (9–3)	Hawaii (11–1)	West Virginia (14–2)	Cincinnati (13–2)	Rhode Island (13–4)	Xavier (14–5)	Michigan (17–7)	Syracuse (19–5)	Michigan (19–8)	Maryland (18–9)	Syracuse (24–8)	21.
22.	Texas	Louisville (0–0)	Georgia (3–1)	Georgia Tech (4–0)	Princeton (6–0)	Maryland (5–3)	Rhode Island (5–1)	West Virginia (11–1)	Arkansas (11–2)	Arkansas (13–2)	Rhode Island (12–3)	Michigan State (13–4)	George Washington (18–3)	TCU (20–4)	Michigan (18–7)	Illinois (20–8)	Syracuse (22–7)	Illinois (22–9)	22.
23.	Ole Miss	Indiana (0–1)	Rhode Island (1–1)	Maryland (3–1)	Georgia (5–2)	Wake Forest (6–1)	West Virginia (9–1)	Arkansas (9–2)	Rhode Island (8–2)	Marquette (10–2)	West Virginia (15–3)	Maryland (12–6)	UMass (16–5)	Syracuse (17–5)	Illinois (18–8)	Syracuse (20–6)	West Virginia (22–7)	Xavier (22–7)	23.
24.	Temple	Illinois State (1–0)	Maryland (2–1)	Wake Forest (5–0)	Georgia Tech (5–1)	TCU (9–0)	Temple (6–3)	Rhode Island (6–1)	Clemson (10–4)	Hawaii (11–2)	Hawaii (12–2)	Xavier (12–5)	Iowa (15–6)	Maryland (14–7)	George Washington (20–5)	Temple (19–6)	Temple (20–7)	Temple (21–8)	24.
25.	Louisville	Georgia (1–1)	Charlotte (0–1)	Princeton (4–0)	Wake Forest (6–1)	Syracuse (7–0)	TCU (9–1)	Marquette (8–0)	West Virginia (12–2)	Oklahoma State (12–1)	Clemson (11–6)	Indiana (14–5)	Maryland (13–7)	Rhode Island (17–5)	Maryland (15–8)	Oklahoma State (20–4)	Oklahoma State (21–5)	Murray State (29–3)	25.
	Preseason	Week 1 Nov. 17	Week 2 Nov. 24	Week 3 Dec. 1	Week 4 Dec. 8	Week 5 Dec. 15	Week 6 Dec. 22	Week 7 Dec. 29	Week 8 Jan. 5	Week 9 Jan. 12	Week 10 Jan. 19	Week 11 Jan. 26	Week 12 Feb. 2	Week 13 Feb. 9	Week 14 Feb. 16	Week 15 Feb. 23	Week 16 Mar. 2	Final Mar. 9	
		Dropped: Texas (0–2)	Dropped: Illinois State (2–1)	Dropped: Oklahoma (4–2); Louisville (2–1); Indiana (2–2); Rhode Island (2–1); Charlotte (1–2)	None	Dropped: Fresno State (4–2); Clemson (5–3); Georgia Tech (5–2)	Dropped: Georgia (7–4); Michigan (7–3); Wake Forest (6–3)	Dropped: Temple (6–3); TCU (10–2)	Dropped: Maryland (8–4)	Dropped: Clemson (10–5)	Dropped: Marquette (11–3); Oklahoma State (12–3)	Dropped: Florida State (13–7); Hawaii (12–4); Clemson (12–7)	Dropped: Rhode Island (14–5); Indiana (15–6)	Dropped: Xavier (15–6); Iowa (16–7)	Dropped: Rhode Island (18–6)	Dropped: George Washington (21–6); Maryland (16–9)	Dropped: UMass (20–9)	Dropped: West Virginia (22–8); Oklahoma State (21–7)	

== Coaches Poll ==
	Preseason	Week 2 Nov. 26	Week 3 Dec. 3	Week 4 Dec. 10	Week 5 Dec. 17	Week 6 Dec. 24	Week 7 Dec. 31	Week 8 Jan. 7	Week 9 Jan. 14	Week 10 Jan. 21	Week 11 Jan. 28	Week 12 Feb. 4	Week 13 Feb. 11	Week 14 Feb. 18	Week 15 Feb. 25	Week 16 Mar. 4	Week 17 Mar. 11	Final Apr. 1	
1.	Arizona	Arizona (1–0)	Duke (6–0)	Duke (8–0)	North Carolina (10–0)	North Carolina (12–0)	North Carolina (13–0)	North Carolina (15–0)	North Carolina (17–0)	Duke (16–1)	Duke (18–1)	Duke (20–1)	North Carolina (24–1)	North Carolina (26–1)	Duke (25–2)	Duke (27–2)	North Carolina (30–3)	Kentucky (35–4)	1.
2.	Duke т	Kansas (4–0)	North Carolina (6–0)	North Carolina (9–0)	Duke (9–1)	Duke (10–1)	Duke (10–1)	Duke (12–1)	Duke (14–1)	North Carolina (18–1)	North Carolina (20–1)	North Carolina (22–1)	Duke (21–2)	Duke (23–2)	Arizona (24–3)	Arizona (25–3)	Kansas (34–3)	Utah (30–4)	2.
3.	North Carolina т	North Carolina (3–0)	Kansas (6–0)	Kansas (8–1)	Kansas (11–1)	Kansas (13–1)	Kansas (15–1)	Utah (12–0)	Kansas (19–2)	Kansas (21–2)	Utah (17–0)	Kansas (24–3)	Kansas (26–3)	Arizona (22–3)	North Carolina (26–2)	Kansas (31–3)	Duke (29–3)	North Carolina (34–4)	3.
4.	Kansas	Duke (2–0)	Arizona (4–1)	Arizona (5–2)	Kentucky (8–1)	Kentucky (9–2)	Utah (11–0)	Kansas (17–2)	Utah (13–0)	Utah (15–0)	Stanford (18–0)	Arizona (19–3)	Arizona (21–3)	Kansas (28–3)	Kansas (30–3)	North Carolina (27–3)	Arizona (27–4)	Stanford (30–5)	4.
5.	UCLA	Purdue (3–0)	Purdue (5–1)	Kentucky (6–1)	Arizona (7–2)	Arizona (7–2)	Purdue (11–2)	Arizona (10–3)	Arizona (13–3)	Arizona (15–3)	Kansas (22–3)	Utah (18–1)	Utah (20–1)	Utah (21–2)	Utah (22–2)	Utah (25–2)	Connecticut (29–4)	Duke (32–4)	5.
6.	Purdue	UCLA (0–0)	South Carolina (3–0)	Utah (7–0)	Utah (9–0)	Utah (10–0)	Arizona (8–3)	Kentucky (12–2)	Kentucky (14–2)	Stanford (16–0)	Arizona (17–3)	UCLA (17–3)	Connecticut (21–3)	Purdue (22–4)	Connecticut (24–4)	Connecticut (26–4)	Kentucky (29–4)	Arizona (30–5)	6.
7.	Clemson	Kentucky (1–0)	Kentucky (4–1)	Purdue (6–2)	Purdue (8–2)	Purdue (9–2)	Kentucky (10–2)	Stanford (12–0)	Stanford (14–0)	Kentucky (16–2)	Kentucky (18–2)	Connecticut (19–3)	Kentucky (21–3)	Connecticut (22–4)	Princeton (23–1)	Kentucky (26–4)	Utah (25–3)	Connecticut (32–5)	7.
8.	South Carolina	South Carolina (2–0)	New Mexico (5–0)	South Carolina (5–0)	South Carolina (5–0)	Stanford (7–0)	Stanford (9–0)	Connecticut (13–1) т	Purdue (14–3)	Connecticut (16–2)	Connecticut (17–3)	Purdue (19–4)	Purdue (20–4)	Princeton (20–1)	Kentucky (24–4)	Princeton (25–1)	Princeton (26–1)	Kansas (35–4)	8.
9.	Kentucky	New Mexico (4–0)	Xavier (3–0)	Xavier (5–0)	Stanford (5–0)	UCLA (6–1)	UCLA (8–1)	Purdue (12–3) т	UCLA (12–2)	Purdue (15–4)	UCLA (15–3)	Kentucky (19–3)	Princeton (18–1)	New Mexico (19–3)	Stanford (23–3)	Purdue (24–6)	Purdue (26–7)	Purdue (28–8)	9.
10.	New Mexico	Xavier (2–0)	Utah (5–0)	Iowa (6–0)	Xavier (6–1)	South Carolina (6–1)	South Carolina (7–1)	New Mexico (10–1)	Connecticut (14–2)	UCLA (13–3)	Purdue (17–4)	Stanford (18–2)	UCLA (18–4)	Kentucky (22–4)	Purdue (22–6)	Ole Miss (21–5)	Stanford (26–4)	Michigan State (22–8)	10.
11.	Xavier	Connecticut (3–0)	Stanford (4–0)	Stanford (5–0)	UCLA (4–1)	Connecticut (9–1)	Connecticut (11–1)	Iowa (13–1)	Ole Miss (12–1)	Princeton (13–1)	Princeton (14–1)	Princeton (16–1)	New Mexico (18–3)	Stanford (21–3)	South Carolina (20–5)	Stanford (24–4)	Cincinnati (26–5)	Rhode Island (25–9)	11.
12.	Stanford	Clemson (3–1)	Iowa (3–0)	New Mexico (5–1)	Connecticut (8–1)	New Mexico (7–1)	Xavier (7–2)	UCLA (9–2)	Princeton (13–1)	Iowa (15–2)	Ole Miss (14–2)	New Mexico (16–3)	Arkansas (20–3)	UCLA (19–5)	Michigan State (20–5)	Michigan State (20–6)	Michigan (24–8)	UCLA (24–9)	12.
13.	Connecticut	Stanford (1–0)	Connecticut (5–1)	Connecticut (7–1)	Iowa (7–1)	Xavier (6–2)	New Mexico (8–1)	Florida State (12–2)	New Mexico (11–2)	New Mexico (13–3)	New Mexico (14–3)	South Carolina (16–3)	Stanford (19–3)	South Carolina (19–4)	Ole Miss (19–5)	Cincinnati (23–5)	South Carolina (22–6)	Syracuse (26–9)	13.
14.	Utah	Utah (3–0)	Ole Miss (3–0)	UCLA (3–1)	Arkansas (7–0)	Arkansas (8–0)	Iowa (11–1)	Ole Miss (10–1)	Iowa (13–2)	Ole Miss (12–2)	South Carolina (13–3)	Arkansas (18–3)	South Carolina (17–4)	Ole Miss (17–5)	Arkansas (22–5)	TCU (26–4)	Ole Miss (22–6)	Cincinnati (27–6)	14.
15.	Fresno State	Fresno State (2–0)	UCLA (2–1)	Florida State (6–1)	New Mexico (7–1)	Iowa (8–1)	Florida State (9–2)	Princeton (11–1)	Syracuse (14–1)	Syracuse (15–2)	Arkansas (16–3)	West Virginia (18–3)	Michigan State (17–4)	Michigan State (18–5)	New Mexico (21–4)	South Carolina (21–6)	Michigan State (20–7)	Maryland (21–11)	15.
16.	Iowa	Iowa (2–0)	Clemson (3–2)	Arkansas (6–0)	Temple (6–1)	Ole Miss (7–1)	Princeton (10–1)	South Carolina (8–2)	Florida State (12–4)	Michigan (14–4)	Iowa (15–4)	Ole Miss (14–4)	Ole Miss (15–5)	Arkansas (20–5)	UCLA (20–6)	Arkansas (22–7)	TCU (27–5)	Princeton (27–2)	16.
17.	Charlotte	Oklahoma (3–0)	Fresno State (3–1)	Temple (4–1)	Florida State (7–1)	Princeton (8–1)	Ole Miss (8–1)	Xavier (8–3)	South Carolina (10–2)	South Carolina (11–3)	Michigan (15–5)	Syracuse (17–4)	West Virginia (19–4)	Syracuse (19–5)	Cincinnati (21–5)	UCLA (21–7)	Arkansas (23–8)	Michigan (25–9)	17.
18.	Indiana	Ole Miss (2–0)	Florida State (4–1)	Clemson (5–2)	Ole Miss (5–1)	Florida State (8–2)	Maryland (7–3)	Michigan (12–3)	Michigan (13–4)	Xavier (11–4)	Syracuse (15–4)	Michigan (16–6)	George Washington (20–3)	Cincinnati (19–5)	TCU (24–4)	Michigan (21–8)	New Mexico (23–7)	West Virginia (24–9)	18.
19.	Louisville	Louisville (0–0)	Temple (2–1)	Ole Miss (4–1)	Princeton (7–1)	Syracuse (9–0)	Syracuse (11–1)	Syracuse (12–1)	Xavier (10–3)	Arkansas (14–3)	West Virginia (17–3)	Michigan State (15–4)	Michigan (17–7)	West Virginia (20–5)	West Virginia (22–5)	New Mexico (21–6)	Syracuse (24–8)	South Carolina (23–8)	19.
20.	Michigan	Temple (2–1)	Princeton (4–0)	Princeton (6–0)	Maryland (5–3)	Maryland (5–3)	Michigan (11–3)	Marquette (10–0)	West Virginia (14–2)	Florida State (13–5)	Cincinnati (15–3)	Cincinnati (16–4)	Syracuse (17–5)	UMass (19–6)	UMass (20–7)	Illinois (21–8)	UCLA (22–8)	Ole Miss (22–7)	20.
21.	Oklahoma	Indiana (1–1)	Arkansas (4–0)	Fresno State (3–1)	Georgia (7–2)	Temple (6–3)	Clemson (9–3)	West Virginia (12–2)	Marquette (10–2)	West Virginia (15–3)	Rhode Island (13–4)	Iowa (15–6)	Cincinnati (17–5)	Michigan (18–7)	Michigan (19–8)	Syracuse (22–7)	Xavier (22–7)	New Mexico (24–8)	21.
22.	Georgia	Princeton (3–0)	Georgia (5–1)	Maryland (4–2)	Wake Forest (6–1)	Clemson (7–3)	Temple (6–3)	Clemson (10–4)	Arkansas (13–2)	Rhode Island (12–3)	Xavier (12–5)	Xavier (14–5)	UMass (17–6)	TCU (22–4)	Syracuse (20–6)	West Virginia (22–7)	Maryland (19–10)	Arkansas (24–9)	22.
23.	Maryland	Charlotte (0–1)	Georgia Tech (4–0)	Georgia Tech (5–1)	Syracuse (7–0)	Georgia Tech (7–2)	West Virginia (11–1)	Hawaii (11–1)	Rhode Island (10–2)	Clemson (11–6)	Florida State (13–7)	Rhode Island (14–5)	Xavier (15–6)	George Washington (20–5)	Illinois (20–8)	UMass (20–9)	Illinois (22–9)	Valparaiso (23–10)	23.
24.	Texas	Georgia (3–1)	Wake Forest (5–0)	Wake Forest (6–1)	TCU (9–0)	Marquette (6–0)	Arkansas (9–2)	Arkansas (11–2)	Hawaii (11–2)	Hawaii (12–2)	Maryland (12–6)	UMass (16–5)	Rhode Island (17–5)	Xavier (16–6)	Xavier (18–6)	Maryland (18–9)	Temple (21–8)	Washington (20–10)	24.
25.	Rhode Island	Florida State (3–0) т Wake Forest (3–0) т	Louisville (2–1)	Georgia (5–2)	Clemson (5–3)	TCU (9–1)	Marquette (8–0)	Rhode Island (8–2)	Clemson (10–5)	Cincinnati (13–2)	Michigan State (13–4)	George Washington (18–3)	Maryland (14–7)	Rhode Island (18–6)	Maryland (16–9)	Temple (20–7)	Oklahoma (22–10)	TCU (27–6)	25.
	Preseason	Week 2 Nov. 26	Week 3 Dec. 3	Week 4 Dec. 10	Week 5 Dec. 17	Week 6 Dec. 24	Week 7 Dec. 31	Week 8 Jan. 7	Week 9 Jan. 14	Week 10 Jan. 21	Week 11 Jan. 28	Week 12 Feb. 4	Week 13 Feb. 11	Week 14 Feb. 18	Week 15 Feb. 25	Week 16 Mar. 4	Week 17 Mar. 11	Final Apr. 1	
		Dropped: Michigan (2–1); Maryland (2–1); Texas (1–2); Rhode Island (1–1)	Dropped: Oklahoma (3–2); Indiana (2–2); Charlotte (1–2)	Dropped: Louisville	Dropped: Fresno State (4–2); Georgia Tech (5–2)	Dropped: Georgia (7–4); Wake Forest (6–3)	Dropped: Georgia Tech; TCU (10–2)	Dropped: Maryland (8–4); Temple	None	Dropped: Marquette (11–3)	Dropped: Hawaii (12–4); Clemson (12–7)	Dropped: Florida State; Maryland (13–7)	Dropped: Iowa (16–7)	Dropped: Maryland (15–8)	Dropped: George Washington (21–6); Rhode Island	Dropped: Xavier (18–6)	Dropped: West Virginia (22–8); UMass	Dropped: Xavier (22–8); Illinois (22–9); Temple (21–9); Oklahoma (22–11)	
