= 1997–98 Eastern Michigan Eagles men's basketball team =

American college basketball season

1997–98 Eastern Michigan Eagles men's basketball

MAC tournament champions

NCAA tournament, first round
- Conference: Mid-American Conference
- Record: 20–10 (13–5 MAC)
- Head coach: Milton Barnes (2nd season)
- Home arena: Bowen Field House

1997–98 Mid-American Conference men's basketball standings
	Conf.				Overall
Team	W		L	PCT	W		L	PCT
East
Akron	13	–	5	.722	17	–	10	.630
Kent State	9	–	9	.500	13	–	17	.433
Miami	9	–	9	.500	17	–	12	.586
Marshall	7	–	11	.389	11	–	16	.407
Bowling Green	7	–	11	.389	10	–	16	.385
Ohio	3	–	15	.167	5	–	21	.192
West
Ball State	14	–	4	.778	21	–	8	.724
Western Michigan	14	–	4	.778	21	–	8	.724
Eastern Michigan †	13	–	5	.722	20	–	10	.667
Toledo	10	–	8	.556	15	–	12	.556
Northern Illinois	6	–	12	.333	10	–	16	.385
Central Michigan	3	–	15	.167	5	–	21	.192
† 1998 MAC tournament winner Rankings from AP Poll

The 1997–98 Eastern Michigan Eagles men's basketball team represented Eastern Michigan University during the 1997–98 NCAA Division I men's basketball season. The Eagles, led by head coach Milton Barnes, played their home games at Bowen Field House and were members of the Mid-American Conference. They finished the season 20–10, 13–5 in MAC play. They finished third in the MAC West regular season standings and won the MAC tournament to receive an automatic bid to the NCAA tournament as No. 13 seed in the East region. The Eagles were beaten by No. 4 seed Michigan State in the opening round in what was Tom Izzo's first NCAA Tournament win.

== Roster ==
1997–98 Eastern Michigan Hurons men's basketball team
Players
Coaches

Pos.	#	Name	Height	Weight	Year	Previous school	Hometown
G	3	Derrick Dial	6 ft 4 in (1.93 m)	180 lb (82 kg)	Sr	Cass Technical	Detroit, Michigan
G	11	Earl Boykins	5 ft 5 in (1.65 m)	130 lb (59 kg)	Sr	Cleveland Central Catholic	Cleveland, Ohio

Head coach

- Milton Barnes

Assistant coach(es)

Legend

- (C) Team captain
- (S) Suspended
- (I) Ineligible
- (W) Walk-on
- Injured
- Current redshirt

== Schedule and results ==
Date time, TV	Rank^{#}	Opponent^{#}	Result	Record	Site (attendance) city, state
Regular season
Nov 15, 1997*		Drake	W 86–58	1–0	Bowen Field House; Ypsilanti, Michigan
Nov 17, 1997*		at UNLV; Preseason NIT	L 66–84	1–1	Thomas & Mack Center (4,692); Las Vegas, Nevada
Nov 30, 1997*		Ashland	W 81–70	2–1	Bowen Field House; Ypsilanti, Michigan
Dec 3, 1997*		at Minnesota	L 58–65	2–2	Williams Arena; Minneapolis, Minnesota
Dec 6, 1997*		at Dayton	L 76–81	2–3	UD Arena; Dayton, Ohio
Dec 17, 1997*		at Michigan	W 89–83 ^{OT}	3–3	Crisler Arena; Ann Arbor, Michigan
Dec 20, 1997		at Toledo	W 57–56	4–3 (1–0)	Savage Arena; Toledo, Ohio
Dec 27, 1997*		vs. Boston University; Arizona State Tribune Classic	W 72–69	5–3	Desert Financial Arena; Tempe, Arizona
Dec 28, 1997*		at Arizona State; Arizona State Tribune Classic	L 90–102	5–4	Desert Financial Arena; Tempe, Arizona
Jan 3, 1998		Ohio	W 85–64	6–4 (2–0)	Bowen Field House; Ypsilanti, Michigan
Jan 5, 1998		Marshall	W 99–82	7–4 (3–0)	Bowen Field House; Ypsilanti, Michigan
Jan 8, 1998		at Miami (OH)	L 64–72	7–5 (3–1)	Millett Hall; Oxford, Ohio
Jan 10, 1998		at Bowling Green	L 75–78	7–6 (3–2)	Anderson Arena; Bowling Green, Ohio
Jan 14, 1998		Ball State	W 73–63	8–6 (4–2)	Bowen Field House; Ypsilanti, Michigan
Jan 17, 1998		at Northern Illinois	W 75–72	9–6 (5–2)	Chick Evans Field House; DeKalb, Illinois
Jan 21, 1998; 7:00 p.m.		at Western Michigan	L 85–98	9–7 (5–3)	University Arena; Kalamazoo, Michigan
Jan 24, 1998		Central Michigan	W 85–53	10–7 (6–3)	Bowen Field House; Ypsilanti, Michigan
Jan 29, 1998		Bowling Green	W 86–67	11–7 (7–3)	Bowen Field House; Ypsilanti, Michigan
Jan 31, 1998		Miami (OH)	W 71–67	12–7 (8–3)	Bowen Field House; Ypsilanti, Michigan
Feb 5, 1998		at Akron	L 67–69	12–8 (8–4)	Rhodes Arena; Akron, Ohio
Feb 7, 1998		at Kent State	W 79–74	13–8 (9–4)	Memorial Gym; Kent, Ohio
Feb 11, 1998		at Ball State	W 89–77	14–8 (10–4)	University Arena; Muncie, Indiana
Feb 14, 1998		Northern Illinois	W 66–61	15–8 (11–4)	Bowen Field House; Ypsilanti, Michigan
Feb 18, 1998		at Central Michigan	W 97–82	16–8 (12–4)	Rose Arena; Mount Pleasant, Michigan
Feb 21, 1998; 7:00 p.m.		Western Michigan	L 82–102	16–9 (12–5)	Bowen Field House; Ypsilanti, Michigan
Feb 25, 1998		Toledo	W 87–86	17–9 (13–5)	Bowen Field House; Ypsilanti, Michigan
MAC tournament
Feb 28, 1998*	(4)	(5) Toledo; Quarterfinals	W 98–79	18–9	Bowen Field House; Ypsilanti, Michigan
Mar 3, 1998*	(4)	vs. (1) Ball State; Semifinals	W 93–92 ^{OT}	19–9	SeaGate Convention Center; Toledo, Ohio
Mar 4, 1998*	(4)	vs. (7) Miami (OH); Championship game	W 92–77	20–9	SeaGate Convention Center; Toledo, Ohio
NCAA tournament
Mar 12, 1998*; CBS	(13 E)	vs. (4 E) No. 16 Michigan State; First Round	L 71–83	20–10	Hartford Civic Center; Hartford, Connecticut
*Non-conference game. ^{#}Rankings from AP Poll. (#) Tournament seedings in parentheses. E=East. All times are in Eastern Time.

== NBA draft ==
Round	Pick	Player	NBA club
2	52	Derrick Dial	San Antonio Spurs
