= 1995–96 Eastern Michigan Eagles men's basketball team =

American college basketball season

1995–96 Eastern Michigan Eagles men's basketball

MAC Regular season champions MAC tournament champions

NCAA tournament, second round
- Conference: Mid-American Conference
- Record: 25–6 (14–4 MAC)
- Head coach: Ben Braun (11th season)
- Assistant coaches: Brian Miller; Gary Waters (7th season)
- Home arena: Bowen Field House

1995–96 Mid-American Conference men's basketball standings
	Conf.				Overall
Team	W		L	PCT	W		L	PCT
Eastern Michigan †	14	–	4	.778	25	–	6	.806
Western Michigan	13	–	5	.722	15	–	12	.556
Miami	12	–	6	.667	21	–	8	.724
Ohio	11	–	7	.611	16	–	14	.533
Ball State	11	–	7	.611	16	–	12	.571
Bowling Green	9	–	9	.500	14	–	13	.519
Toledo	9	–	9	.500	18	–	14	.563
Kent State	8	–	10	.444	14	–	13	.519
Central Michigan	3	–	15	.167	6	–	20	.231
Akron	0	–	18	.000	3	–	23	.115
† 1996 MAC tournament winner Rankings from AP Poll

The 1995–96 Eastern Michigan Eagles men's basketball team represented Eastern Michigan University during the 1995–96 NCAA Division I men's basketball season. The Eagles, led by head coach Ben Braun, played their home games at Bowen Field House and were members of the Mid-American Conference. They finished the season 25–6, 14–4 in MAC play. They were MAC Regular season and MAC tournament champions, and received an automatic bid to the NCAA tournament as No. 9 seed in the Southeast region. The Eagles defeated Duke before falling to No. 1 seed UConn in the second round.

== Roster ==
1995–96 Eastern Michigan Hurons men's basketball team
Players
Coaches

Pos.	#	Name	Height	Weight	Year	Previous school	Hometown
G	3	Derrick Dial	6 ft 4 in (1.93 m)	180 lb (82 kg)	So	Cass Technical	Detroit, Michigan
G	10	Brian Tolbert	6 ft 2 in (1.88 m)	—	Sr
G	11	Earl Boykins	5 ft 5 in (1.65 m)	130 lb (59 kg)	So	Cleveland Central Catholic	Cleveland, Ohio

Head coach

- Ben Braun

Assistant coach(es)

- Brian Miller
- Gary Waters
- Craig Rasmuson (graduate assistant)
- Charles E. Ramsey (volunteer assistant)

Legend

- (C) Team captain
- (S) Suspended
- (I) Ineligible
- (W) Walk-on
- Injured
- Current redshirt

== Schedule and results ==
Date time, TV	Rank^{#}	Opponent^{#}	Result	Record	Site (attendance) city, state
Regular season
Nov 25, 1995*		Saint Francis (IN)	W 83–70	1–0	Bowen Field House; Ypsilanti, Michigan
Dec 27, 1995*		vs. Texas Tech	W 93–77	7–0	Don Haskins Center; El Paso, Texas
Jan 3, 1996		Toledo	W 91–87 ^{2OT}	8–1 (1–0)	Bowen Field House; Ypsilanti, Michigan
Mar 2, 1996		at Toledo	W 95–85	21–5 (14–4)	John F. Savage Hall; Toledo, Ohio
MAC tournament
Mar 5, 1996*		Kent State; Quarterfinals	W 84–72	22–5	Bowen Field House; Ypsilanti, Michigan
Mar 8, 1996*		vs. Ball State; Semifinals	W 87–71	23–5	SeaGate Convention Center; Toledo, Ohio
Mar 9, 1996*		at Toledo; Championship game	W 77–63	24–5	SeaGate Convention Center; Toledo, Ohio
NCAA tournament
Mar 14, 1996*	(9 MW)	vs. (8 MW) Duke; First Round	W 75–60	25–5	RCA Dome (31,373); Indianapolis, Indiana
Mar 16, 1996*	(9 MW)	vs. (1 MW) No. 3 Connecticut; Second Round	L 81–95	25–6	RCA Dome; Indianapolis, Indiana
*Non-conference game. ^{#}Rankings from AP Poll. (#) Tournament seedings in parentheses. SE=Southeast. All times are in Eastern Time.

== Awards and honors ==
- Ben Braun – MAC Coach of the Year
