= 1992–93 Ball State Cardinals men's basketball team =

American college basketball season

1992–93 Ball State Cardinals men's basketball

MAC regular season champions MAC tournament champions

NCAA tournament, first round
- Conference: Mid-American Conference
- Record: 26–8 (14–4 MAC)
- Head coach: Dick Hunsaker (4th season)
- Assistant coach: Leonard Drake
- Home arena: Worthen Arena

1992–93 Mid-American Conference men's basketball standings
| | Conf. | | | | Overall |
| Team | W | | L | PCT | W | | L | PCT |
|---|---|---|---|---|---|---|---|---|
| Ball State † | 14 | – | 4 | .778 | 26 | – | 8 | .765 |
| Miami (OH) | 14 | – | 4 | .778 | 22 | – | 9 | .710 |
| Western Michigan | 12 | – | 6 | .667 | 17 | – | 12 | .586 |
| Ohio | 11 | – | 7 | .611 | 14 | – | 13 | .519 |
| Toledo | 9 | – | 9 | .500 | 12 | – | 16 | .429 |
| Eastern Michigan | 8 | – | 10 | .444 | 13 | – | 17 | .433 |
| Bowling Green | 8 | – | 10 | .444 | 11 | – | 16 | .407 |
| Kent State | 7 | – | 11 | .389 | 10 | – | 17 | .370 |
| Central Michigan | 4 | – | 14 | .222 | 8 | – | 18 | .308 |
| Akron | 3 | – | 15 | .167 | 8 | – | 18 | .308 |
† 1993 MAC tournament winner Rankings from AP Poll

The 1992–93 Ball State Cardinals men's basketball team represented Ball State University as a member of the Mid-American Conference during the 1992–93 NCAA Division I men's basketball season. The team was led by head coach Dick Hunsaker and played their home games at the brand new Worthen Arena in Muncie, Indiana. Ball State finished atop the MAC regular season standings and also won the MAC tournament to receive the conference's automatic bid to the 1993 NCAA tournament. Playing as the No. 15 seed in the Midwest region, the Cardinals were beaten in the opening round by No. 2 seed and eventual Final Four participant Kansas, 94–72.

== Roster ==
1992–93 Ball State Cardinals men's basketball team
Players
Coaches

| Pos. | # | Name | Height | Weight | Year | Previous school | Hometown |
|---|---|---|---|---|---|---|---|
| F | 4 | Jeermal Sylvester | 6 ft 6 in (1.98 m) | — | Jr |
| G | | Mark Hardwick | 6 ft 2 in (1.88 m) | 165 lb (75 kg) | Sr | Jay County | Dunkirk, IN |

Head coach

- Dick Hunsaker (Weber State)

Assistant coach(es)

- Leonard Drake
- Ron Hecklinski (part time)

Legend

- (C) Team captain
- (S) Suspended
- (I) Ineligible
- (W) Walk-on
- Injured
- Current redshirt

Roster

== Schedule and results ==
| Date time, TV | Rank^{#} | Opponent^{#} | Result | Record | Site city, state |
Non-conference regular season
| Dec 7, 1992* | | Xavier | L 78–81 | 2–1 | Worthen Arena; Muncie, Indiana |
MAC regular season
MAC tournament
| Mar 11, 1993* | | vs. Kent State; Quarterfinals | W 77–57 | 24–7 | Battelle Hall; Columbus, Ohio |
| Mar 12, 1993* | | vs. Toledo; Semifinals | W 72–64 | 25–7 | Battelle Hall; Columbus, Ohio |
| Mar 13, 1993* | | vs. Western Michigan; Championship game | W 79–64 | 26–7 | Battelle Hall; Columbus, Ohio |
NCAA tournament
| Mar 18, 1993* | (15 MW) | vs. (2 MW) No. 9 Kansas; First Round | L 72–94 | 26–8 | Rosemont Horizon; Rosemont, Illinois |
*Non-conference game. ^{#}Rankings from AP poll. (#) Tournament seedings in parentheses. All times are in Eastern Time Sources.
