= 1993–94 Ohio Bobcats men's basketball team =

American college basketball season

1993–94 Ohio Bobcats men's basketball

MAC tournament champions MAC Regular Season champions Big Island Invitational champions

NCAA tournament, first round
- Conference: Mid-American Conference
- Record: 25–8 (14–4 MAC)
- Head coach: Larry Hunter (5th season)
- Assistant coaches: Jayson Gee; Mike Elfers; Dan Aloi
- Home arena: Convocation Center

1993–94 Mid-American Conference men's basketball standings
	Conf.				Overall
Team	W		L	PCT	W		L	PCT
Ohio †	14	–	4	.778	25	–	8	.758
Bowling Green	12	–	6	.667	18	–	10	.643
Miami (OH)	12	–	6	.667	19	–	11	.633
Ball State	11	–	7	.611	16	–	12	.571
Toledo	10	–	8	.556	15	–	12	.556
Eastern Michigan	10	–	8	.556	15	–	12	.556
Kent State	8	–	10	.444	13	–	14	.481
Western Michigan	7	–	11	.389	14	–	14	.500
Central Michigan	4	–	14	.222	5	–	21	.192
Akron	2	–	16	.111	8	–	18	.308
† 1994 MAC tournament winner Rankings from AP Poll

The 1993–94 Ohio Bobcats men's basketball team represented Ohio University as a member of the Mid-American Conference in the college basketball season of 1993–94. The team was coached by Larry Hunter and played their home games at the Convocation Center. The Bobcats won the Big Island Invitational tournament, MAC regular season and conference tournament titles, and received an automatic bid to the NCAA tournament. Ohio finished with a record of 25–8 (14–4 MAC).

== Roster ==
1993–94 Ohio Bobcats men's basketball team
Players
Coaches

Pos.	#	Name	Height	Weight	Year	Hometown
G	4	Chad Estis	6 ft 0 in (1.83 m)	185 lb (84 kg)	Sr	Aurora, OH
G	22	Rush Floyd	6 ft 1 in (1.85 m)	185 lb (84 kg)	Sr	Pickerington, OH
F	41	Kevin Murphy	6 ft 9 in (2.06 m)	215 lb (98 kg)	Sr	Lawton, OK
F	45	Jeff Boals	6 ft 7 in (2.01 m)	240 lb (109 kg)	Jr	Magnolia, OH
F	43	Ryan Greenwood	6 ft 7 in (2.01 m)	240 lb (109 kg)	Jr	Indianapolis, IN
G	23	Mike Reese	6 ft 2 in (1.88 m)	190 lb (86 kg)	Jr	Hamilton, OH
G	15	Jude Alexander	6 ft 2 in (1.88 m)	178 lb (81 kg)	Fr	Dublin, OH
F	24	Jason Kent	6 ft 4 in (1.93 m)	192 lb (87 kg)	So	Columbus, OH
C	52	Jason Terry	7 ft 2 in (2.18 m)	235 lb (107 kg)	So	Mount Gilead, OH
F	20	Gary Trent	6 ft 8 in (2.03 m)	240 lb (109 kg)	So	Columbus, OH
G	12	Geno Ford	5 ft 8 in (1.73 m)	160 lb (73 kg)	Fr	Cambridge, OH
F	44	Curtis Simmons	6 ft 5 in (1.96 m)	216 lb (98 kg)	Fr	Columbus, OH

Head coach

- Larry Hunter

Assistant coach(es)

- Jayson Gee
- Mike Elfers
- Dan Aloi

Legend

- (C) Team captain
- (S) Suspended
- (I) Ineligible
- (W) Walk-on
- Injured
- Current redshirt

== Schedule and results ==
Date time, TV	Rank^{#}	Opponent^{#}	Result	Record	Site city, state
Non-conference regular season
Nov 30, 1993*		Ohio Dominican	W 84–51	1–0	Convocation Center; Athens, Ohio
Dec 3, 1993*		at Nebraska; Ameritas Classic	L 68–94	1–1	Bob Devaney Sports Center; Lincoln, Nebraska
Dec 4, 1993*		vs. Navy; Ameritas Classic	W 68–50	2–1	Bob Devaney Sports Center; Lincoln, Nebraska
Dec 11, 1993*		Robert Morris	W 74–52	3–1	Convocation Center; Athens, Ohio
Dec 14, 1993*		at Duquesne	L 74–79	3–2	A.J. Palumbo Center; Pittsburgh, Pennsylvania
Dec 18, 1993*		at West Virginia	L 81–90	3–3	WVU Coliseum; Morgantown, West Virginia
Dec 20, 1993*		Youngstown State	W 85–42	4–3	Convocation Center; Athens, Ohio
Dec 22, 1993*		at Wright State	W 78–63	5–3	Ervin J. Nutter Center; Fairborn, Ohio
Dec 28, 1993*		vs. Chaminade; Big Island Invitational	W 79–76	6–3	Civic Auditorium; Hilo, Hawaii
Dec 29, 1993*		vs. No. 14 Connecticut; Big Island Invitational	W 85–76	7–3	Civic Auditorium; Hilo, Hawaii
Dec 30, 1993*		vs. La Salle; Big Island Invitational	W 100–80	8–3	Civic Auditorium; Hilo, Hawaii
MAC regular season
Jan 5, 1994		at Ball State	W 84–66	9–3 (1–0)	Worthen Arena; Muncie, Indiana
Jan 8, 1994		Miami (OH)	L 66–79	9–4 (1–1)	Convocation Center; Athens, Ohio
Jan 12, 1994		at Western Michigan	L 65–75	9–5 (1–2)	University Arena; Kalamazoo, Michigan
Jan 15, 1994		Akron	W 85–64	10–5 (2–2)	Convocation Center; Athens, Ohio
Jan 19, 1994		Central Michigan	W 74–57	11–5 (3–2)	Convocation Center; Athens, Ohio
Jan 22, 1994		at Bowling Green	L 72–76	11–6 (3–3)	Anderson Arena; Bowling Green, Ohio
Jan 26, 1994		Eastern Michigan	W 94–83	12–6 (4–3)	Convocation Center; Athens, Ohio
Jan 29, 1994		at Toledo	L 77–78	12–7 (4–4)	John F. Savage Hall; Toledo, Ohio
Feb 2, 1994		Kent State	W 87–49	13–7 (5–4)	Convocation Center; Athens, Ohio
Feb 5, 1994		at Miami (OH)	W 77–63	14–7 (6–4)	Millett Hall; Oxford, Ohio
Feb 9, 1994		Western Michigan	W 86–61	15–7 (7–4)	Convocation Center; Athens, Ohio
Feb 12, 1994		at Akron	W 94–77	16–7 (8–4)	James A. Rhodes Arena; Akron, Ohio
Feb 16, 1994		at Central Michigan	W 84–48	17–7 (9–4)	Rose Arena; Mount Pleasant, Michigan
Feb 19, 1994		Bowling Green	W 84–70	18–7 (10–4)	Convocation Center; Athens, Ohio
Feb 23, 1994		at Eastern Michigan	W 92–82	19–7 (11–4)	Bowen Field House; Ypsilanti, Michigan
Feb 26, 1994		Toledo	W 82–79	20–7 (12–4)	Convocation Center; Athens, Ohio
Mar 2, 1994		at Kent State	W 71–70	21–7 (13–4)	Memorial Athletic and Convocation Center; Kent, Ohio
Mar 5, 1994		Ball State	W 91–76	22–7 (14–4)	Convocation Center; Athens, Ohio
MAC tournament
Mar 8, 1994*	(1)	(8) Western Michigan; MAC Tournament Quarterfinal	W 87–56	23–7	Convocation Center; Athens, Ohio
Mar 9, 1994*	(1)	vs. (4) Ball State; MAC Tournament Semifinal	W 79–70	24–7	Battelle Hall; Columbus, Ohio
Mar 10, 1994*	(1)	vs. (3) Miami (OH); MAC Tournament Championship	W 89–66	25–7	Battelle Hall; Columbus, Ohio
NCAA tournament
Mar 18, 1994*	(12 E)	vs. (5 E) No. 18 Indiana; First Round	L 72–84	25–8	Capital Centre; Landover, Maryland
*Non-conference game. ^{#}Rankings from AP poll. (#) Tournament seedings in parentheses. E=East. All times are in Eastern Time.

== Statistics ==
=== Team statistics ===
Final 1993–94 statistics

Record	Ohio	OPP
Scoring	2668	2282
Scoring Average	80.85	69.15
Field goals – Att	924–1945	808–1933
3-pt. Field goals – Att	208–530	169–500
Free throws – Att	612–911	497–769
Rebounds	1314	1123
Assists	489	442
Turnovers	492	479
Steals	190	260
Blocked Shots	168	79

=== Player statistics ===
			Minutes		Scoring		Total FGs			3-point FGs			Free-Throws			Rebounds								
Player	GP	GS	Tot	Avg	Pts	Avg	FG	FGA	Pct	3FG	3FA	Pct	FT	FTA	Pct	Off	Def	Tot	Avg	A	PF	TO	Stl	Blk
Gary Trent	33	32	1215	36.8	837	25.4	309	536	0.576	9	33	0.273	210	291	0.722	-	-	377	11.4	65	78	125	28	53
Chad Estis	33	19	884	26.8	367	11.1	112	275	0.407	80	205	0.39	63	81	0.778	-	-	55	1.7	93	53	39	29	1
Geno Ford	33	24	891	27	309	9.4	85	218	0.39	43	102	0.422	96	128	0.75	-	-	50	1.5	69	80	53	28	0
Gus Johnson	33	9	630	19.1	227	6.9	59	138	0.428	45	106	0.425	64	76	0.842	-	-	40	1.2	38	40	31	21	0
Jason Terry	33	32	750	22.7	220	6.7	85	174	0.489	0	0	0	50	84	0.595	-	-	152	4.6	18	90	40	1	85
Jeff Boals	33	19	862	26.1	206	6.2	81	178	0.455	4	12	0.333	40	68	0.588	-	-	171	5.2	68	93	74	25	2
Curtis Simmons	33	15	572	17.3	150	4.5	65	126	0.516	0	0	0	20	50	0.4	-	-	123	3.7	34	70	0	18	13
Mike Reese	30	13	541	18	141	4.7	51	106	0.481	13	33	0.394	26	53	0.491	-	-	58	1.9	65	39	38	19	2
Ryan Greenwood	24	1	377	15.7	71	3	25	64	0.391	0	0	0	21	37	0.568	-	-	94	3.9	19	50	26	14	5
Jason Kent	29	0	162	5.6	49	1.7	20	52	0.385	3	8	0.375	6	12	0.5	-	-	20	0.7	11	18	13	3	1
Kevin Murphy	29	1	141	4.7	46	2.1	17	33	0.515	0	0	0	12	24	0.5	-	-	35	0.5	8	21	4	1	6
Rush Floyd	21	0	99	4.9	45	1.6	15	45	0.333	11	31	0.355	4	7	0.571	-	-	10	1.2	1	8	11	3	0
Total	33	-	-	-	2668	80.8	924	1945	0.475	208	530	0.392	612	911	0.672			1314	39.8	489	640	492	190	168
Opponents	33	-	-	-	2282	69.2	808	1933	0.418	169	500	0.338	497	769	0.646			1123	34.0	442	759	479	260	79

Legend
GP	Games played	GS	Games started	Avg	Average per game
FG	Field-goals made	FGA	Field-goal attempts	Off	Offensive rebounds
Def	Defensive rebounds	A	Assists	TO	Turnovers
Blk	Blocks	Stl	Steals	High	Team high

== Awards and honors ==
- Gary Trent – MAC Player of the Year (2x)
