= 1997–98 Western Michigan Broncos men's basketball team =

American college basketball season

1997–98 Western Michigan Broncos men's basketball

MAC West Division Co-Champions

NCAA Tournament, second round
- Conference: Mid-American Conference
- West Division
- Record: 21–8 (14–4 MAC)
- Head coach: Bob Donewald
- Home arena: University Arena

1997–98 Mid-American Conference men's basketball standings
| | Conf. | | | | Overall |
| Team | W | | L | PCT | W | | L | PCT |
|---|---|---|---|---|---|---|---|---|
East
| Akron | 13 | – | 5 | .722 | 17 | – | 10 | .630 |
| Kent State | 9 | – | 9 | .500 | 13 | – | 17 | .433 |
| Miami | 9 | – | 9 | .500 | 17 | – | 12 | .586 |
| Marshall | 7 | – | 11 | .389 | 11 | – | 16 | .407 |
| Bowling Green | 7 | – | 11 | .389 | 10 | – | 16 | .385 |
| Ohio | 3 | – | 15 | .167 | 5 | – | 21 | .192 |
West
| Ball State | 14 | – | 4 | .778 | 21 | – | 8 | .724 |
| Western Michigan | 14 | – | 4 | .778 | 21 | – | 8 | .724 |
| Eastern Michigan † | 13 | – | 5 | .722 | 20 | – | 10 | .667 |
| Toledo | 10 | – | 8 | .556 | 15 | – | 12 | .556 |
| Northern Illinois | 6 | – | 12 | .333 | 10 | – | 16 | .385 |
| Central Michigan | 3 | – | 15 | .167 | 5 | – | 21 | .192 |
† 1998 MAC tournament winner Rankings from AP Poll

The 1997–98 Western Michigan Broncos men's basketball team was a National Collegiate Athletic Association (NCAA) Division I college basketball team that played in the Mid-American Conference (MAC). The Broncos, 21–8 overall and 12–4 in the conference, shared a piece of the MAC West Division title and earned an at-large bid to the 1998 NCAA Division I men's basketball tournament.

As an 11-seed, WMU upset six-seeded Clemson in the first round of the NCAA Tournament before falling to eventual Final Four team Stanford in the second round.

== Preseason ==
MAC West preseason poll
| School | Points |
|---|---|
| Eastern Michigan (47) | 311 |
| Toledo (2) | 223 |
| Ball State (3) | 219 |
| Western Michigan (1) | 167 |
| Northern Illinois | 134 |
| Central Michigan | 59 |
First place votes in parentheses.

The Broncos were picked to finish fourth in the MAC West Division and received one first-place vote. They won their two exhibition games, defeating Marathon Oil, 83–66 and the Ohio All-Stars, 93–71.

== Season ==
WMU defeated Michigan 68–63 in the opening game of the season. Senior guard Saddi Washington scored 33 points on 10–22 shooting, and the 12-point underdogs overcame an 11-point deficit with a 26–10 run to end the game.

=== Hoosier Classic ===
Western Michigan participated in the 1997 Hoosier Classic, the 16th-annual holiday tournament held at Market Square Arena in Indianapolis, Indiana. The Broncos played UNC Charlotte in the first game of the tournament, winning 81–65. In the championship game against Indiana, WMU held a 31–29 lead at the half before losing 70–63. Saddi Washington was named tournament MVP.

=== Conference tournament ===
Western Michigan finished the season tied with Ball State with the best conference record, but lost the head-to-head tiebreaker and was given the No. 2 seed in the conference tournament. In the first round of the tournament, WMU faced No. 7 seed Miami on their home court in Kalamazoo, Michigan. Miami upset the Broncos 67–63, but the notable event of the game was Miami coach Charlie Coles collapsing midway through the first half. The game was stopped while he was transported to a local hospital. Without Coles, the game resumed about two hours later.

=== NCAA tournament ===
Western Michigan received an at-large bid to the 1998 NCAA Division I men's basketball tournament and were seeded No. 11. In the first round, they upset No. 6 Clemson 75–72. Their second round opponent, No. 3 Stanford, defeated No. 14 College of Charleston in the first round. Stanford defeated WMU 83–65 to end the Broncos' season.

== Roster ==
The following table lists WMU's roster.

1997–98 Western Michigan Broncos men's basketball team
Players
Coaches

| Pos. | # | Name | Height | Weight | Year | Previous school | Hometown |
|---|---|---|---|---|---|---|---|
| F | 10 | Ryan Black | 6 ft 5 in (1.96 m) | — | Jr | Waukesha South H.S. |
| G/F | 32 | Isaac Bullock | 6 ft 4 in (1.93 m) | — | Jr | Whetstone H.S. |
| G/F | 35 | Tony Collins | 6 ft 3 in (1.91 m) | — | Fr | Richton P. (IL) Bloom Twp. |
| F | 23 | Carlos Horton | 6 ft 6 in (1.98 m) | — | So | Glenn Hills (PA) H.S. |
| G/F | 33 | Shaun Jackson | 6 ft 7 in (2.01 m) | — | Jr | Norfolk (VA) Maury |
| G | 22 | Josh Jansen | 6 ft 0 in (1.83 m) | — | Fr | Mount Pleasant H.S. |
| G | 20 | Rashod Johnson | 6 ft 1 in (1.85 m) | — | Sr | Rogers H.S. |
| G | 5 | Kylo Jones | 6 ft 0 in (1.83 m) | — | Fr | Orchard Lake St. Mary's H.S. |
| G | 4 | Jason Kimbrough | 5 ft 11 in (1.8 m) | — | Sr | de Porres H.S. |
| C | 50 | Ryan Schultz | 6 ft 10 in (2.08 m) | — | Jr | Coon Rapids H.S. |
| F | 34 | Aaron Toothman | 6 ft 7 in (2.01 m) | — | Sr | Granville H.S. |
| F | 44 | Brad Van Timmeren | 6 ft 7 in (2.01 m) | — | So | Allendale H.S. |
| G/F | 24 | Saddi Washington | 6 ft 3 in (1.91 m) | — | Sr | Sexton H.S. |

Head coach

- Bob Donewald

Assistant coach(es)

Legend

- (C) Team captain
- (S) Suspended
- (I) Ineligible
- (W) Walk-on
- Injured
- Current redshirt

Roster
Last update: January 23, 2018

== Schedule ==
| Date time, TV | Rank^{#} | Opponent^{#} | Result | Record | Site (attendance) city, state |
Regular season
| November 15, 1997*; 7:30 pm, None | | at Michigan | W 68–63 | 1–0 | Crisler Arena (12,237); Ann Arbor, MI |
| November 25, 1997*; 7:00 pm | | Indiana State | W 74–58 | 2–0 | University Arena; Kalamazoo, MI |
| November 29, 1997*; 5:00 pm | | at Wisconsin–Milwaukee | W 84–47 | 3–0 | Milwaukee Arena; Milwaukee, WI |
| December 3, 1997*; 7:00 pm | | Chicago State | W 106–62 | 4–0 | University Arena; Kalamazoo, MI |
| December 6, 1997*; 2:00 pm | | at Detroit | L 59–77 | 4–1 | Calihan Hall; Detroit, MI |
| December 10, 1997; 7:00 pm | | Ball State | L 76–81 | 4–2 (0–1) | University Arena; Kalamazoo, MI |
| December 22, 1997*; 7:00 pm | | Wright State | W 88–74 | 5–2 | University Arena; Kalamazoo, MI |
| December 27, 1997*; 9:00 pm | | vs. UNC Charlotte; Hoosier Classic | W 81–65 | 6–2 | Market Square Arena (15,918); Indianapolis, IN |
| December 28, 1997*; 7:00 pm | | vs. Indiana; Hoosier Classic | L 63–70 | 6–3 | Market Square Arena (12,501); Indianapolis, IN |
| December 31, 1997; 3:00 pm | | at Northern Illinois | W 79–73 | 7–3 (1–1) | Chick Evans Field House; DeKalb, IL |
| January 3, 1998; 2:00 pm | | Bowling Green | W 81–75 | 8–3 (2–1) | University Arena; Kalamazoo, MI |
| January 5, 1998; 7:00 pm | | Miami | W 63–47 | 9–3 (3–1) | University Arena; Kalamazoo, MI |
| January 8, 1998; 7:00 pm | | at Kent State | L 63–65 | 9–4 (3–2) | Memorial Gym; Kent, OH |
| January 10, 1998; 3:00 pm | | at Akron | W 89–83 ^{OT} | 10–4 (4–2) | Rhodes Arena; Akron, OH |
| January 17, 1998; 2:00 pm | | Central Michigan | W 81–63 | 11–4 (5–2) | University Arena; Kalamazoo, MI |
| January 21, 1998; 7:00 pm | | Eastern Michigan | W 96–85 | 12–4 (6–2) | University Arena; Kalamazoo, MI |
| January 24, 1998; 7:00 pm | | at Toledo | W 86–76 | 13–4 (7–2) | Savage Hall; Toledo, OH |
| January 29, 1998; 7:00 pm | | Akron | W 77–63 | 14–4 (8–2) | University Arena; Kalamazoo, MI |
| January 31, 1998; 2:00 pm | | Kent State | W 88–58 | 15–4 (9–2) | University Arena; Kalamazoo, MI |
| February 5, 1998; 7:00 pm | | at Marshall | L 63–78 | 15–5 (9–3) | Cam Henderson Center; Huntington, WV |
| February 7, 1998; 3:00 pm | | at Ohio | W 86–68 | 16–5 (10–3) | Convocation Center; Athens, OH |
| February 14, 1998; 7:00 pm | | at Central Michigan | W 87–68 | 17–5 (11–3) | Rose Arena; Mount Pleasant, MI |
| February 18, 1998; 7:00 pm | | Toledo | W 86–76 | 18–5 (12–3) | University Arena; Kalamazoo, MI |
| February 21, 1998; 7:00 pm | | at Eastern Michigan | W 102–82 | 19–5 (13–3) | Bowen Field House; Ypsilanti, MI |
| February 23, 1998; 7:00 pm | | Northern Illinois | W 80–71 | 20–5 (14–3) | University Arena; Kalamazoo, MI |
| February 25, 1998; 7:00 pm | | Ball State | L 71–80 | 20–6 (14–4) | University Arena; Muncie, IN |
MAC tournament
| February 28, 1998*; 2:00 pm | (2) | vs. (7) Miami; MAC Tournament Quarterfinals | L 63–67 | 20–7 | University Arena (4,293); Kalamazoo, MI |
NCAA tournament
| March 13, 1998*; 12:00 pm, CBS | (11 MW) | vs. (6 MW) Clemson; NCAA First Round | W 75–72 | 21–7 | United Center; Chicago, IL |
| March 15, 1998*; 2:00 pm, CBS | (11 MW) | vs. (3 MW) No. 10 Stanford; NCAA Second Round | L 65–83 | 21–8 | United Center; Chicago, IL |
*Non-conference game. ^{#}Rankings from AP Poll. (#) Tournament seedings in parentheses. All times are in Eastern Time.
