= Derrick Dial =

American basketball player (born 1975)

Personal information
- Born: December 20, 1975 (age 50) Detroit, Michigan, U.S.
- Listed height: 6 ft 4 in (1.93 m)
- Listed weight: 185 lb (84 kg)

Career information
- High school: Cass Technical (Detroit, Michigan)
- College: Eastern Michigan (1994–1998)
- NBA draft: 1998: 2nd round, 52nd overall pick
- Drafted by: San Antonio Spurs
- Playing career: 1998–2009
- Position: Shooting guard / small forward
- Number: 5, 10, 44, 13

Career history
- 1998: Camden Power
- 1998–1999: Peristeri Athens
- 1999–2001: San Antonio Spurs
- 2001–2002: New Jersey Nets
- 2002: South California Surf
- 2002: Toronto Raptors
- 2002–2003: Virtus Bologna
- 2003–2004: Long Beach Jam
- 2003–2004: Orlando Magic
- 2004–2005: Long Beach Jam
- 2005: Valencia
- 2006–2007: Olympiada Patras
- 2008: Anaheim Arsenal
- 2008–2009: Tulsa 66ers

Career highlights
- Greek League All-Star (1998); ABA champion (2004); ABA scoring leader (2002); ABA Offensive Player of the Year (2004); USBL All-Rookie Team (1998); 2× Second-team All-Mid-American Conference (1997, 1998)
- Stats at NBA.com
- Stats at Basketball Reference

Derrick Jonathon Dial (born December 20, 1975) is an American-born former professional basketball player. During his pro club career, he played four seasons in the National Basketball Association (NBA). Dial also played professionally in the Greek Basket League, the Italian A League, and the Spanish ACB League.

== High school career ==
Dial attended and graduated from Cass Technical High School, in Detroit, Michigan, where he also played competitive high school basketball.

== College career ==
Dial attended Eastern Michigan University, where he played college basketball with the school's men's basketball team, the Eastern Michigan Eagles, from 1994 to 1998. At Eastern Michigan, Dial won the championship of both the 1996 edition and the 1998 edition of the Mid-American Conference Tournament, while also being named to the All-Tournament Team both times. He was also an All-Mid-American Conference Second Team selection, for both the 1996–97 and 1997–98 seasons.

He was inducted into the Eastern Michigan Athletics Hall of Fame in 2013.

== Professional career ==
After college, Dial was drafted in the second round, with the 52nd overall draft pick of the 1998 NBA draft, by the NBA's San Antonio Spurs. Dial played in the Greek Basket League with Peristeri Athens, during the 1998–99 season. He then played in the NBA with the Spurs, from 1999 to 2001, when he moved to the New Jersey Nets, for the 2001–02 season. Dial also played in the NBA with the Toronto Raptors, during the 2001–02 season.

Dial spent the 2002–03 season playing with the Italian A League club Virtus Bologna. With Virtus Bologna, he also played in the 2002–03 edition of the EuroLeague. Dial returned to the NBA for the 2003–04 season, which he spent with the Orlando Magic. He then played in the Spanish ACB League with Valencia, during the 2005–06 season. He played with the Greek club Olympiada Patras, in the 2006–07 season.

On November 7, 2008, Dial was selected with the 16th pick of the 8th round of the 2008 NBA Development League draft by the Tulsa 66ers. He would go on to play the 2008–09 season in the D League with the 66ers.
