= 1992–93 Ohio Bobcats men's basketball team =

American college basketball season

1992–93 Ohio Bobcats men's basketball
- Conference: Mid-American Conference
- Record: 14–13 (11–7 MAC)
- Head coach: Larry Hunter (4th season)
- Assistant coaches: David Greer; Mike Elfers
- Home arena: Convocation Center

1992–93 Mid-American Conference men's basketball standings
| | Conf. | | | | Overall |
| Team | W | | L | PCT | W | | L | PCT |
|---|---|---|---|---|---|---|---|---|
| Ball State † | 14 | – | 4 | .778 | 26 | – | 8 | .765 |
| Miami (OH) | 14 | – | 4 | .778 | 22 | – | 9 | .710 |
| Western Michigan | 12 | – | 6 | .667 | 17 | – | 12 | .586 |
| Ohio | 11 | – | 7 | .611 | 14 | – | 13 | .519 |
| Toledo | 9 | – | 9 | .500 | 12 | – | 16 | .429 |
| Eastern Michigan | 8 | – | 10 | .444 | 13 | – | 17 | .433 |
| Bowling Green | 8 | – | 10 | .444 | 11 | – | 16 | .407 |
| Kent State | 7 | – | 11 | .389 | 10 | – | 17 | .370 |
| Central Michigan | 4 | – | 14 | .222 | 8 | – | 18 | .308 |
| Akron | 3 | – | 15 | .167 | 8 | – | 18 | .308 |
† 1993 MAC tournament winner Rankings from AP Poll

The 1992–93 Ohio Bobcats men's basketball team represented Ohio University in the college basketball season of 1992–93. The team was coached by Larry Hunter and played their home games at the Convocation Center. They finished the season 14–13 and finished fourth in the MAC regular season with a conference record of 11–7. Gary Trent was named MAC Player of the year.

== Roster ==
1992–93 Ohio Bobcats men's basketball team
Players
Coaches

| Pos. | # | Name | Height | Weight | Year | Hometown |
|---|---|---|---|---|---|---|
| G | 12 | Jay Barry | 6 ft 2 in (1.88 m) | 170 lb (77 kg) | Sr | Oxford, OH |
| F | 20 | Chad Gill | 6 ft 6 in (1.98 m) | 180 lb (82 kg) | Sr | Columbus, OH |
| G | 4 | Chad Estis | 6 ft 0 in (1.83 m) | 185 lb (84 kg) | Jr | Aurora, OH |
| G | 22 | Rush Floyd | 6 ft 1 in (1.85 m) | 185 lb (84 kg) | Jr | Pickerington, OH |
| F | 41 | Kevin Murphy | 6 ft 9 in (2.06 m) | 215 lb (98 kg) | Jr | Lawton, OK |
| F | 45 | Jeff Boals | 6 ft 7 in (2.01 m) | 240 lb (109 kg) | So | Magnolia, OH |
| F | 43 | Ryan Greenwood | 6 ft 7 in (2.01 m) | 240 lb (109 kg) | So | Indianapolis, IN |
| F | -- | Frank Zielinski | 6 ft 7 in (2.01 m) | 195 lb (88 kg) | So | Birmingham, MI |
| F | 3 | Steve Ehretsman | 6 ft 6 in (1.98 m) | 205 lb (93 kg) | So | Cleveland, OH |
| G | 23 | Mike Reese | 6 ft 2 in (1.88 m) | 190 lb (86 kg) | So | Hamilton, OH |
| G | 21 | Gus Johnson | 6 ft 0 in (1.83 m) | 170 lb (77 kg) | Fr | Huron, OH |
| F | 24 | Jason Kent | 6 ft 4 in (1.93 m) | 192 lb (87 kg) | Fr | Columbus, OH |
| C | 52 | Jason Terry | 7 ft 2 in (2.18 m) | 235 lb (107 kg) | Fr | Mount Gilead, OH |
| F | 20 | Gary Trent | 6 ft 8 in (2.03 m) | 240 lb (109 kg) | Fr | Columbus, OH |

Head coach

- Larry Hunter

Assistant coach(es)

- David Greer
- Mike Elfers

Legend

- (C) Team captain
- (S) Suspended
- (I) Ineligible
- (W) Walk-on
- Injured
- Current redshirt

== Schedule ==
| Date time, TV | Rank^{#} | Opponent^{#} | Result | Record | Site (attendance) city, state |
Non-conference regular season
| 12/2/1992* | | at Ohio State | L 61–77 | 0–1 | |
| 12/5/1992* | | at Robert Morris | L 70–72 | 0–2 | |
| 12/8/1992* | | at Kansas State | L 72–73 ^{OT} | 0–3 | Bramlage Coliseum; Manhattan, Kansas |
| 12/15/1992* | | at Marshall | L 79–87 | 0–4 | |
| 12/19/1992* | | Charleston (WV) | W 98–77 | 1–4 | Convocation Center; Athens, Ohio |
| 12/21/1992* | | Wright State | L 77–80 | 1–5 | Convocation Center (2,347); Athens, Ohio |
| 12/28/1992* | | vs. St. Mary’s (CA); Stanford Tournament | W 73–61 | 2–5 | |
| 12/29/1992* | | vs. Stanford; Stanford Tournament | W 81–76 | 3–5 | |
MAC regular season
| 1/6/1993 | | Toledo | W 67–61 | 4–5 (1–0) | Convocation Center; Athens, Ohio |
| 1/9/1993 | | at Kent State | W 65–64 | 5–5 (2–0) | |
| 1/13/1993 | | Ball State | L 64–78 | 5–6 (2–1) | Convocation Center; Athens, Ohio |
| 1/16/1993 | | at Miami (OH) | W 72–59 | 6–6 (3–1) | |
| 1/20/1993 | | Western Michigan | L 71–86 | 6–7 (3–2) | Convocation Center; Athens, Ohio |
| 1/23/1993 | | at Akron | W 65–58 | 7–7 (4–2) | |
| 1/27/1993 | | at Central Michigan | L 81–91 | 7–8 (4–3) | |
| 1/30/1993 | | Bowling Green | W 73–67 | 8-8 (5–3) | Convocation Center; Athens, Ohio |
| 2/3/1993 | | at Eastern Michigan | W 81–74 ^{OT} | 9–8 (6–3) | |
| 2/6/1993 | | Kent State | W 58–53 | 10–8 (7–3) | Convocation Center; Athens, Ohio |
| 2/10/1993 | | at Ball State | L 52–72 | 10–9 (7–4) | Worthen Arena; Muncie, Indiana |
| 2/14/1993 | | Miami (OH) | L 54–59 | 10–10 (7–5) | Convocation Center; Athens, Ohio |
| 2/17/1993 | | at Western Michigan | L 51–66 | 10–11 (7–6) | |
| 2/20/1993 | | Akron | W 75–67 | 11–11 (8–6) | Convocation Center; Athens, Ohio |
| 2/24/1993 | | Central Michigan | W 66–51 | 12–11 (9–6) | Convocation Center; Athens, Ohio |
| 2/27/1993 | | at Bowling Green | W 71–64 | 13–11 (10–6) | |
| 3/3/1993 | | Eastern Michigan | W 71–62 | 14–11 (11–6) | Convocation Center; Athens, Ohio |
| 3/6/1993 | | at Toledo | L 73–85 | 14–12 (11–7) | |
MAC tournament
| 3/11/1993 | | vs. Toledo; Quarterfinal | L 84–85 ^{OT} | 14–13 (11–8) | |
*Non-conference game. ^{#}Rankings from AP Poll. (#) Tournament seedings in parentheses. All times are in Eastern Time.

== Statistics ==
=== Team statistics ===
Final 1992–93 statistics

| Record | Ohio | OPP |
|---|---|---|
| Scoring | 1905 | 1905 |
| Scoring Average | 70.56 | 70.56 |
| Field goals – Att | 654–1426 | 646–1439 |
| 3-pt. Field goals – Att | 122–359 | 145–357 |
| Free throws – Att | 475–660 | 468–665 |
| Rebounds | 928 | 831 |
| Assists | 386 | 325 |
| Turnovers | 419 | 346 |
| Steals | 122 | 190 |
| Blocked Shots | 56 | 76 |

=== Player statistics ===
| | | | Minutes | | Scoring | | Total FGs | | | 3-point FGs | | | Free-Throws | | | Rebounds | | | | | | | | |
| Player | GP | GS | Tot | Avg | Pts | Avg | FG | FGA | Pct | 3FG | 3FA | Pct | FT | FTA | Pct | Off | Def | Tot | Avg | A | PF | TO | Stl | Blk |
|---|---|---|---|---|---|---|---|---|---|---|---|---|---|---|---|---|---|---|---|---|---|---|---|---|
| Gary Trent | 27 | 27 | 892 | 33 | 514 | 19 | 194 | 298 | 0.651 | 0 | 1 | 0 | 126 | 181 | 0.696 | - | - | 250 | 9.3 | 42 | 52 | 69 | 12 | 26 |
| Gus Johnson | 25 | 24 | 810 | 32.4 | 248 | 9.9 | 72 | 197 | 0.365 | 42 | 124 | 0.339 | 62 | 74 | 0.838 | - | - | 55 | 2.2 | 54 | 56 | 58 | 22 | 0 |
| Chad Estis | 27 | 18 | 787 | 29.1 | 243 | 9 | 68 | 192 | 0.354 | 52 | 143 | 0.364 | 55 | 63 | 0.873 | - | - | 64 | 2.4 | 72 | 73 | 39 | 18 | 0 |
| Jeff Boals | 27 | 17 | 653 | 24.2 | 202 | 7.5 | 67 | 139 | 0.482 | 1 | 2 | 0.5 | 67 | 99 | 0.677 | - | - | 122 | 4.5 | 65 | 92 | 63 | 13 | 3 |
| Steve Ehretsman | 27 | 20 | 546 | 20.2 | 182 | 6.7 | 63 | 149 | 0.423 | 15 | 48 | 0.313 | 41 | 59 | 0.695 | - | - | 65 | 2.4 | 29 | 51 | 47 | 4 | 3 |
| Ryan Greenwood | 27 | 7 | 446 | 16.5 | 136 | 5 | 47 | 114 | 0.412 | 0 | 0 | 0 | 42 | 57 | 0.737 | - | - | 78 | 2.9 | 45 | 62 | 35 | 14 | 6 |
| Jason Terry | 27 | 3 | 298 | 11 | 123 | 4.6 | 44 | 99 | 0.444 | 0 | 0 | 0 | 35 | 52 | 0.673 | - | - | 52 | 1.9 | 8 | 38 | 19 | 1 | 15 |
| Mike Reese | 25 | 12 | 452 | 18.1 | 112 | 4.5 | 43 | 106 | 0.406 | 3 | 6 | 0.5 | 23 | 32 | 0.719 | - | - | 65 | 2.6 | 42 | 47 | 55 | 21 | 1 |
| Jason Kent | 23 | 0 | 194 | 8.4 | 57 | 2.5 | 25 | 55 | 0.455 | 1 | 2 | 0.5 | 6 | 13 | 0.462 | - | - | 21 | 0.9 | 6 | 19 | 15 | 5 | 0 |
| Rush Floyd | 22 | 6 | 224 | 10.2 | 35 | 1.6 | 10 | 38 | 0.263 | 5 | 26 | 0.192 | 10 | 16 | 0.625 | - | - | 33 | 1.5 | 16 | 38 | 6 | 8 | 1 |
| Chad Gill | 11 | 1 | 111 | 10.1 | 27 | 2.5 | 11 | 19 | 0.579 | 1 | 1 | 1 | 4 | 9 | 0.444 | - | - | 12 | 1.1 | 5 | 14 | 6 | 2 | 0 |
| Jay Barry | 11 | 0 | 33 | 3 | 11 | 1 | 4 | 12 | 0.333 | 2 | 6 | 0.333 | 1 | 2 | 0.5 | - | - | 5 | 0.5 | 2 | 9 | 2 | 2 | 0 |
| Kevin Murphy | 8 | 0 | 24 | 3 | 11 | 1.4 | 5 | 7 | 0.714 | 0 | 0 | 0 | 1 | 1 | 1 | - | - | 5 | 0.6 | 0 | 5 | 2 | 0 | 1 |
| Dean Rahas | 3 | 0 | 5 | 1.7 | 4 | 1.3 | 1 | 1 | 1 | 0 | 0 | 0 | 2 | 2 | 1 | - | - | 0 | 0 | 0 | 1 | 0 | 0 | 0 |
| Total | 27 | - | 0 | - | 1905 | 70.6 | 654 | 1426 | 0.459 | 122 | 359 | 0.340 | 475 | 660 | 0.720 | 0 | 0 | 928 | 34.4 | 386 | 557 | 419 | 122 | 56 |
| Opponents | 27 | - | 0 | - | 1905 | 70.6 | 646 | 1439 | 0.449 | 145 | 357 | 0.406 | 468 | 665 | 0.704 | | | 831 | 30.8 | 325 | 575 | 346 | 190 | 76 |

Legend
| GP | Games played | GS | Games started | Avg | Average per game |
| FG | Field-goals made | FGA | Field-goal attempts | Off | Offensive rebounds |
| Def | Defensive rebounds | A | Assists | TO | Turnovers |
| Blk | Blocks | Stl | Steals | High | Team high |

== Awards and honors ==
- Gary Trent – MAC Player of the Year
