= Larry Hunter =

American basketball player and coach

Biographical details
- Born: August 8, 1949; Athens, Ohio, U.S.
- Died: May 4, 2018 (aged 68); Cary, North Carolina, U.S.

Playing career

Basketball
- 1970–1971: Ohio

Coaching career (HC unless noted)

Basketball
- 1971–1973: Marietta (assistant)
- 1973–1976: Wittenberg (assistant)
- 1976–1989: Wittenberg
- 1989–2001: Ohio
- 2001–2002: NC State (assistant)
- 2002–2005: NC State (associate HC)
- 2005–2018: Western Carolina

Soccer
- 1973–1975: Wittenberg

Head coaching record
- Overall: 702–453 (basketball); 11–20–1 (soccer)

Accomplishments and honors

Championships
- Basketball; NCAA Division III tournament (1977); 6 OAC tournament (1979, 1981–1983, 1985, 1987); 4 OAC regular season (1980, 1981, 1985, 1989); MAC tournament (1994); MAC regular season (1994); 2 OAC Southern Division (1977, 1978); 2 SoCon North Division (2009, 2011)

Awards
- Basketball; NABC Division III Coach of the Year (1977); 2× OAC Coach of the Year (1980, 1989); MAC Coach of the Year (1994)

Larry Hunter (August 8, 1949 – May 4, 2018) was an American college basketball coach. He served as the head basketball coach at Wittenberg University from 1976 to 1989, Ohio University from 1989 to 2001, and Western Carolina University from 2005 to 2018, compiling a career college basketball coaching record of 702–453. As head coach of the Ohio Bobcats men's basketball team from 1989 to 2001, he had a record of 204–148. His Bobcats teams made one NCAA Division I men's basketball tournament appearance in 1994, an NIT appearance in 1995, and won the Preseason NIT in 1994. Despite his winning record and being second on Ohios' all-time wins list with only two losing seasons, he was fired in 2001. Hunter also played at Ohio University from 1970 to 1971.

Ohio hired its alumnus away from Wittenberg University in Springfield, Ohio. Hunter was the head coach at Wittenberg for 13 seasons, leading the Tigers to the program's second NCAA Division III men's basketball tournament championship, in 1977, and garnered NABC Division III National Coach of the Year the same year. He was the first coach in NCAA history to win a national championship in his first season at a school. In total, Hunter won six regular season Ohio Athletic Conference championships and six Ohio Athletic Conference tournament championships during his tenure at Wittenberg. Before moving to Western Carolina University, he was an assistant coach and an associate head coach under Herb Sendek at North Carolina State University. On March 4, 2018, Hunter announced that he was stepping down as coach of Western Carolina.

Less than two months after he stepped down at Western Carolina, he suffered a stroke and was sent to a hospital in Cary, North Carolina, where he died less than a week later.

== Head coaching record ==
=== Basketball ===
Record table
| Season | Team | Overall | Conference | Standing | Postseason |
|---|---|---|---|---|---|
Wittenberg Tigers (Ohio Athletic Conference) (1976–1989)
| 1976–77 | Wittenberg | 23–5 | 10–2 | 1st (Southern) | NCAA Division III champions |
| 1977–78 | Wittenberg | 16–7 | 9–3 | 1st (Southern) | |
| 1978–79 | Wittenberg | 23–6 | 10–3 | 3rd | NCAA Division III Regional Runner-up |
| 1979–80 | Wittenberg | 29–3 | 13–0 | 1st | NCAA Division III Third Place |
| 1980–81 | Wittenberg | 28–3 | 12–1 | T–1st | NCAA Division III Regional Runner-up |
| 1981–82 | Wittenberg | 20–10 | 10–3 | T–2nd | NCAA Division III Regional Fourth Place |
| 1982–83 | Wittenberg | 26–6 | 10–3 | T–2nd | NCAA Division III Runner-up |
| 1983–84 | Wittenberg | 18–9 | 10–3 | T–2nd | |
| 1984–85 | Wittenberg | 27–4 | 14–2 | T–1st | NCAA Division III Quarterfinal |
| 1985–86 | Wittenberg | 23–5 | 13–3 | 2nd | NCAA Division Regional third place |
| 1986–87 | Wittenberg | 25–8 | 12–3 | 2nd | NCAA Division III Third Place |
| 1987–88 | Wittenberg | 20–7 | 12–4 | T–2nd | |
| 1988–89 | Wittenberg | 27–3 | 15–1 | 1st | NCAA Division III Regional Runner-up |
| Wittenberg: | | 305–76 (.801) | 150–31 (.829) | | |
Ohio Bobcats (Mid-American Conference) (1989–2001)
| 1989–90 | Ohio | 12–16 | 5–11 | 8th | |
| 1990–91 | Ohio | 16–12 | 9–7 | 5th | |
| 1991–92 | Ohio | 18–10 | 10–6 | 4th | |
| 1992–93 | Ohio | 14–13 | 11–7 | 4th | |
| 1993–94 | Ohio | 25–8 | 14–4 | 1st | NCAA Division I First Round |
| 1994–95 | Ohio | 24–10 | 13–5 | 2nd | NIT Second Round |
| 1995–96 | Ohio | 16–14 | 11–7 | 4th | |
| 1996–97 | Ohio | 17–10 | 12–6 | 3rd | |
| 1997–98 | Ohio | 5–21 | 3–15 | 6th (East) | |
| 1998–99 | Ohio | 18–10 | 12–6 | 4th (East) | |
| 1999–00 | Ohio | 20–13 | 11–7 | 5th (East) | |
| 2000–01 | Ohio | 19–11 | 12–6 | 3rd (East) | |
| Ohio: | | 204–148 (.580) | 123–87 (.586) | | |
Western Carolina Catamounts (Southern Conference) (2005–2018)
| 2005–06 | Western Carolina | 13–17 | 7–7 | 3rd (North) | |
| 2006–07 | Western Carolina | 11–20 | 7–11 | 3rd (North) | |
| 2007–08 | Western Carolina | 10–21 | 6–14 | 5th (North) | |
| 2008–09 | Western Carolina | 16–15 | 11–9 | T–1st (North) | |
| 2009–10 | Western Carolina | 22–12 | 11–7 | 2nd (North) | CIT First Round |
| 2010–11 | Western Carolina | 18–15 | 12–6 | T–1st (North) | |
| 2011–12 | Western Carolina | 17–18 | 8–10 | T–3rd (North) | |
| 2012–13 | Western Carolina | 14–19 | 9–9 | T–5th | |
| 2013–14 | Western Carolina | 19–15 | 10–6 | 5th | |
| 2014–15 | Western Carolina | 15–17 | 9–9 | 4th | |
| 2015–16 | Western Carolina | 16–18 | 10–8 | T–5th | CBI First Round |
| 2016–17 | Western Carolina | 9–23 | 4–14 | T–8th | |
| 2017–18 | Western Carolina | 13–19 | 8–10 | 6th | |
| Western Carolina: | | 193–229 (.457) | 112–120 (.483) | | |
| Total: | | 702–453 (.608) | | | |
National champion Postseason invitational champion Conference regular season champion Conference regular season and conference tournament champion Division regular season champion Division regular season and conference tournament champion Conference tournament champion

=== Soccer ===
Record table
| Season | Team | Overall | Conference | Standing | Postseason |
|---|---|---|---|---|---|
Wittenberg Tigers (Ohio Athletic Conference) (1973–1975)
| 1973 | Wittenberg | 3–9 | 2–7 | 9th | |
| 1974 | Wittenberg | 3–7 | 3–5 | 8th | |
| 1975 | Wittenberg | 5–4–1 | 1–3–1 | 5th (Southern) | |
| Wittenberg: | | 11–20–1 (.359) | 6–15–1 (.295) | | |
| Total: | | 11–20–1 (.359) | | | |

== See also ==
- List of college men's basketball coaches with 600 wins
