= 1998 MAC men's basketball tournament =

- Classification: Division I
- Season: 1997–98
- Teams: 8
- Site: On-campus sites (quarterfinal round); SeaGate Centre; Toledo, Ohio
- Champions: Eastern Michigan (4th title)
- Winning coach: Milton Barnes (1st title)
- MVP: Earl Boykins (Eastern Michigan)
- MAC men's basketball tournaments

1997–98 Mid-American Conference men's basketball standings
	Conf.				Overall
Team	W		L	PCT	W		L	PCT
East
Akron	13	–	5	.722	17	–	10	.630
Kent State	9	–	9	.500	13	–	17	.433
Miami	9	–	9	.500	17	–	12	.586
Marshall	7	–	11	.389	11	–	16	.407
Bowling Green	7	–	11	.389	10	–	16	.385
Ohio	3	–	15	.167	5	–	21	.192
West
Ball State	14	–	4	.778	21	–	8	.724
Western Michigan	14	–	4	.778	21	–	8	.724
Eastern Michigan †	13	–	5	.722	20	–	10	.667
Toledo	10	–	8	.556	15	–	12	.556
Northern Illinois	6	–	12	.333	10	–	16	.385
Central Michigan	3	–	15	.167	5	–	21	.192
† 1998 MAC tournament winner Rankings from AP Poll

The 1998 MAC men's basketball tournament, a part of the 1997–98 NCAA Division I men's basketball season, took place at campus sites for the quarterfinal round with the semifinals and final held at SeaGate Centre in Toledo, Ohio. Its winner received the Mid-American Conference's automatic bid to the 1998 NCAA tournament. It was a single-elimination tournament with three rounds and the top eight MAC teams invited to participate. No teams received byes in the tournament. Ball State, the MAC West Division co-champion, received the number one seed in the tournament.

Eastern Michigan won the title by beating Miami in the final. Earl Boykins was unanimously selected as the tournament MVP.

== Tournament ==
=== Seeds ===
1. Ball State
2. Western Michigan
3. Akron
4. Eastern Michigan
5. Toledo
6. Kent State
7. Miami
8. Marshall

=== Bracket ===
Quarterfinals
1	Ball State	93
8	Marshall	76
4	Eastern Michigan	98
5	Toledo	79
2	Western Michigan	63
7	Miami	67
3	Akron	88
6	Kent State	95

Semifinals
1	Ball State	92
4	Eastern Michigan	93*
7	Miami	64
6	Kent State	59

Finals
4	Eastern Michigan	92
7	Miami	77

* Overtime period
