= 1995–96 Ohio Bobcats men's basketball team =

American college basketball season

1995–96 Ohio Bobcats men's basketball
- Conference: Mid-American Conference
- Record: 16–14 (11–7 MAC)
- Head coach: Larry Hunter (7th season)
- Assistant coaches: Jayson Gee; Mike Elfers; Dan Aloi
- Home arena: Convocation Center

1995–96 Mid-American Conference men's basketball standings
| | Conf. | | | | Overall |
| Team | W | | L | PCT | W | | L | PCT |
|---|---|---|---|---|---|---|---|---|
| Eastern Michigan † | 14 | – | 4 | .778 | 25 | – | 6 | .806 |
| Western Michigan | 13 | – | 5 | .722 | 15 | – | 12 | .556 |
| Miami | 12 | – | 6 | .667 | 21 | – | 8 | .724 |
| Ohio | 11 | – | 7 | .611 | 16 | – | 14 | .533 |
| Ball State | 11 | – | 7 | .611 | 16 | – | 12 | .571 |
| Bowling Green | 9 | – | 9 | .500 | 14 | – | 13 | .519 |
| Toledo | 9 | – | 9 | .500 | 18 | – | 14 | .563 |
| Kent State | 8 | – | 10 | .444 | 14 | – | 13 | .519 |
| Central Michigan | 3 | – | 15 | .167 | 6 | – | 20 | .231 |
| Akron | 0 | – | 18 | .000 | 3 | – | 23 | .115 |
† 1996 MAC tournament winner Rankings from AP Poll

The 1995–96 Ohio Bobcats men's basketball team represented Ohio University in the college basketball season of 1995–96. The team was coached by Larry Hunter and played their home games at the Convocation Center. They finished the season 16–14 and finished fourth in the MAC regular season with a conference record of 11–7.

== Roster ==
1995–96 Ohio Bobcats men's basketball team
Players
Coaches

| Pos. | # | Name | Height | Weight | Year | Hometown |
|---|---|---|---|---|---|---|
| G | 21 | Gus Johnson | 6 ft 0 in (1.83 m) | 170 lb (77 kg) | Sr | Huron, OH |
| C | 50 | Ed Sears | 6 ft 9 in (2.06 m) | 280 lb (127 kg) | Sr | Brooklyn, N.Y |
| C | 52 | Jason Terry | 7 ft 2 in (2.18 m) | 235 lb (107 kg) | Sr | Mount Gilead, OH |
| G | 12 | Geno Ford | 5 ft 8 in (1.73 m) | 160 lb (73 kg) | Jr | Cambridge, OH |
| F | 45 | Paul Morris | 6 ft 7 in (2.01 m) | 240 lb (109 kg) | Jr | Rapid City, SD |
| G | 00 | Jonathan Berkley sr | 6 ft 1 in (1.85 m) | 195 lb (88 kg) | Fr | Louisville, Kentucky |
| F | 33 | Basra Fakhir | 6 ft 5 in (1.96 m) | 240 lb (109 kg) | So | East Cleveland, OH |
| G | 22 | Jim Peterson | 6 ft 5 in (1.96 m) | 215 lb (98 kg) | So | Beaver Falls, PA |
| C | 41 | Andy Kanzig | 6 ft 10 in (2.08 m) | 280 lb (127 kg) | Fr | Perrysville, OH |
| F | 32 | Diante Flenorl | 6 ft 9 in (2.06 m) | 215 lb (98 kg) | Fr | Milwaukee, WI |
| F | 24 | Matt Jager | 6 ft 7 in (2.01 m) | 220 lb (100 kg) | Fr | Vista, CA |
| G | 10 | Corey Reed | 5 ft 10 in (1.78 m) | 175 lb (79 kg) | Fr | Milwaukee, WI |
| F | 35 | Damion Washington | 6 ft 4 in (1.93 m) | 180 lb (82 kg) | Fr | Toledo, OH |

Head coach

- Larry Hunter

Assistant coach(es)

- Jayson Gee
- Mike Elfers
- Dan Aloi

Legend

- (C) Team captain
- (S) Suspended
- (I) Ineligible
- (W) Walk-on
- Injured
- Current redshirt

== Schedule ==
| Date time, TV | Rank^{#} | Opponent^{#} | Result | Record | Site (attendance) city, state |
Non-conference regular season
| 11/22/1995* | | vs. No. 10 Iowa; Great Alaska Shootout | L 51–78 | 0–1 | Sullivan Arena (7,863); Anchorage, AK |
| 11/23/1995* | | vs. TCU; Great Alaska Shootout | W 86–68 | 1–1 | Sullivan Arena; Anchorage, AK |
| 11/24/1995* | | vs. Old Dominion; Great Alaska Shootout | W 90–89 ^{2OT} | 2–1 | Sullivan Arena; Anchorage, AK |
| 12/6/1995* | | Illinois State | L 65–66 | 2–2 | Convocation Center (4,608); Athens, OH |
| 12/9/1995* | | Xavier | W 103–72 | 3–1 | |
| 12/12/1995* | | at Wright State | L 77–88 | 3–3 | Nutter Center; Fairborn, OH |
| 12/16/1995* | | at West Virginia | L 69–94 | 3–4 | |
| 12/20/1995* | | Rio Grande | W 97–74 | 4–4 | |
| 12/23/1995* | | at Duquesne | L 80–93 | 4–5 | |
| 12/29/1995* | | vs. Princeton; Pepsi/Oneida Casino Classic | L 60–65 | 4–6 | |
| 12/30/1995* | | vs. Coppin State; Pepsi/Oneida Casino Classic | W 94–92 | 5–6 | |
MAC regular season
| 1/3/1996 | | at Ball State | L 54–57 | 5–7 (0–1) | |
| 1/6/1996 | | Miami (OH) | W 65–56 | 6–7 (1–1) | |
| 1/10/1996 | | at Kent State | L 68–69 | 6–8 (1–2) | |
| 1/13/1996 | | at Bowling Green | L 69–84 | 6-9 (1–3) | |
| 1/17/1996 | | Toledo | W 70–57 | 7-9 (2–3) | |
| 1/20/1996 | | at Akron | W 81–60 | 8–9 (3–3) | |
| 1/24/1996 | | Western Michigan | L 59–66 | 8–10 (3–4) | |
| 1/27/1996 | | at Central Michigan | W 72–65 | 9–10 (4–4) | |
| 1/31/1996 | | No. 23 Eastern Michigan | W 82–73 | 10–10 (5–4) | |
| 2/3/1996 | | at Miami (OH) | L 61–76 | 10–11 (5–5) | |
| 2/7/1996 | | Kent State | W 69–61 | 11–11 (6–5) | |
| 2/10/1996 | | Bowling Green | W 83–67 | 12–11 (7–5) | |
| 2/14/1996 | | at Toledo | W 72–60 | 13–11 (8–5) | |
| 2/17/1996 | | Akron | W 73–59 | 14–11 (9–5) | |
| 2/21/1996 | | at Western Michigan | L 51–54 | 14–12 (9–6) | |
| 2/24/1996 | | Central Michigan | W 76–73 | 15–12 (10–6) | |
| 2/28/1996 | | at Eastern Michigan | L 77–81 | 15–13 (10–7) | |
| 3/2/1996 | | Ball State | W 87–67 | 16–13 (11–7) | |
MAC tournament
| 3/5/1996 | | vs. Ball State; Quarterfinal | L 80–86 | 16–14 (11–8) | |
*Non-conference game. ^{#}Rankings from AP Poll. (#) Tournament seedings in parentheses. All times are in Eastern Time.

== Statistics ==
=== Team statistics ===
Final 1995–96 statistics

| Record | Ohio | OPP |
|---|---|---|
| Scoring | 2221 | 2150 |
| Scoring Average | 74.03 | 71.67 |
| Field goals – Att | 815–1772 | 747–1782 |
| 3-pt. Field goals – Att | 117–395 | 186–484 |
| Free throws – Att | 474–680 | 470–689 |
| Rebounds | 1206 | 1115 |
| Assists | 385 | 423 |
| Turnovers | 472 | 398 |
| Steals | 159 | 237 |
| Blocked Shots | 150 | 86 |

=== Player statistics ===
| | | | Minutes | | Scoring | | Total FGs | | | 3-point FGs | | | Free-Throws | | | Rebounds | | | | | | | | |
| Player | GP | GS | Tot | Avg | Pts | Avg | FG | FGA | Pct | 3FG | 3FA | Pct | FT | FTA | Pct | Off | Def | Tot | Avg | A | PF | TO | Stl | Blk |
|---|---|---|---|---|---|---|---|---|---|---|---|---|---|---|---|---|---|---|---|---|---|---|---|---|
| Geno Ford | 30 | - | - | - | 567 | 18.9 | 192 | 451 | 0.426 | 52 | 165 | 0.315 | 131 | 163 | 0.804 | - | - | 82 | 2.7 | 72 | 0 | 0 | 25 | 3 |
| Curtis Simmons | 27 | - | - | - | 450 | 16.7 | 185 | 338 | 0.547 | 2 | 11 | 0.182 | 78 | 129 | 0.605 | - | - | 212 | 7.9 | 76 | 0 | 0 | 41 | 34 |
| Jason Terry | 30 | - | - | - | 364 | 12.1 | 143 | 253 | 0.565 | 0 | 0 | 0 | 78 | 114 | 0.684 | - | - | 187 | 6.2 | 24 | 0 | 0 | 8 | 89 |
| Gus Johnson | 30 | - | - | - | 199 | 6.6 | 58 | 177 | 0.328 | 45 | 142 | 0.317 | 38 | 48 | 0.792 | - | - | 73 | 2.4 | 34 | 0 | 0 | 14 | 1 |
| Paul Morris | 30 | - | - | - | 182 | 6.1 | 67 | 127 | 0.528 | 0 | 1 | 0 | 48 | 71 | 0.676 | - | - | 144 | 4.8 | 51 | 0 | 0 | 11 | 6 |
| Basra Fakhir | 29 | - | - | - | 161 | 5.6 | 61 | 112 | 0.545 | 0 | 1 | 0 | 39 | 62 | 0.629 | - | - | 179 | 6.2 | 19 | 0 | 0 | 7 | 1 |
| Damion Washington | 26 | - | - | - | 104 | 4 | 38 | 112 | 0.339 | 9 | 40 | 0.225 | 19 | 24 | 0.792 | - | - | 86 | 3.3 | 21 | 0 | 0 | 13 | 1 |
| Diante Flenorl | 29 | - | - | - | 73 | 2.5 | 27 | 81 | 0.333 | 1 | 4 | 0.25 | 18 | 27 | 0.667 | - | - | 68 | 2.3 | 28 | 0 | 0 | 9 | 5 |
| Corey Reed | 26 | - | - | - | 68 | 2.6 | 25 | 69 | 0.362 | 0 | 4 | 0 | 18 | 32 | 0.563 | - | - | 47 | 1.8 | 57 | 0 | 0 | 29 | 5 |
| Jim Peterson | 17 | - | - | - | 30 | 1.8 | 9 | 33 | 0.273 | 7 | 26 | 0.269 | 5 | 6 | 0.833 | - | - | 5 | 0.3 | 2 | 0 | 0 | 1 | 1 |
| Andy Kanzig | 15 | - | - | - | 23 | 1.5 | 10 | 18 | 0.556 | 1 | 1 | 1 | 2 | 4 | 0.5 | - | - | 15 | 1 | 1 | 0 | 0 | 1 | 4 |
| Joel Stanley | 3 | - | - | - | 0 | 0 | 0 | 1 | 0 | 0 | 0 | 0 | 0 | 0 | 0 | - | - | 0 | 0 | 0 | 0 | 0 | 0 | 0 |
| Total | 30 | - | - | - | 2221 | 74.0 | 815 | 1772 | 0.460 | 117 | 395 | 0.296 | 474 | 680 | 0.697 | | | 1206 | 40.2 | 385 | 589 | 472 | 159 | 150 |
| Opponents | 30 | - | - | - | 2150 | 71.7 | 747 | 1782 | 0.419 | 186 | 484 | 0.384 | 470 | 689 | 0.682 | | | 1015 | 33.8 | 423 | 587 | 398 | 237 | 86 |

Legend
| GP | Games played | GS | Games started | Avg | Average per game |
| FG | Field-goals made | FGA | Field-goal attempts | Off | Offensive rebounds |
| Def | Defensive rebounds | A | Assists | TO | Turnovers |
| Blk | Blocks | Stl | Steals | High | Team high |
