= Earl Boykins =

American basketball player (born 1976)

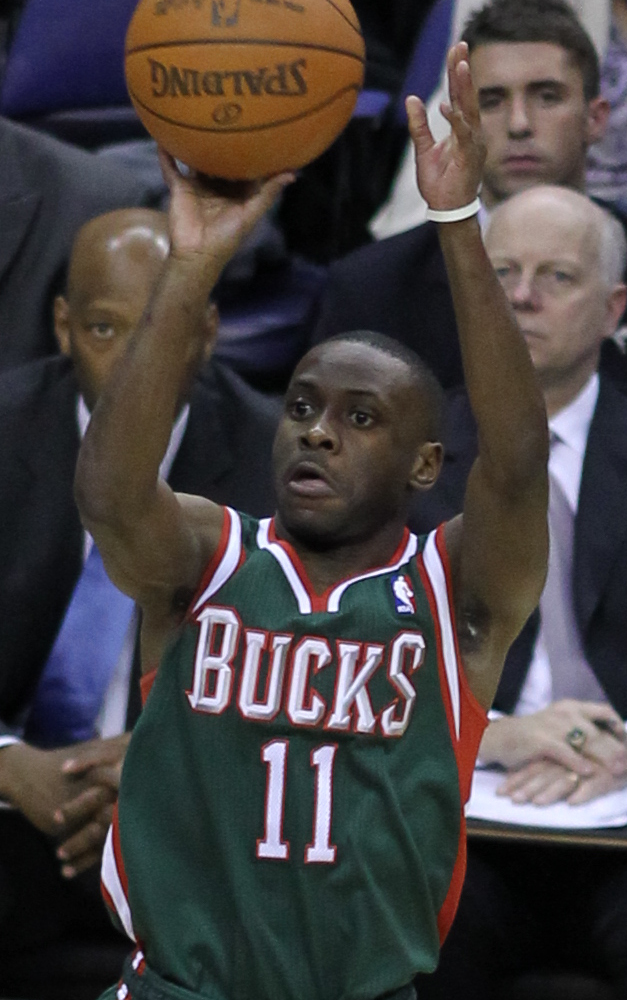
- Boykins with the Milwaukee Bucks in 2011

USC Trojans
- Title: Assistant coach
- League: Big Ten Conference

Personal information
- Born: June 2, 1976 (age 50) Cleveland, Ohio, U.S.
- Listed height: 5 ft 5 in (1.65 m)
- Listed weight: 133 lb (60 kg)

Career information
- High school: Cleveland Central Catholic (Cleveland, Ohio)
- College: Eastern Michigan (1994–1998)
- NBA draft: 1998: undrafted
- Playing career: 1998–2012
- Position: Point guard
- Number: 7, 5, 11, 12, 6
- Coaching career: 2013–present

Career history

Playing
- 1998–1999: Rockford Lightning
- 1999: New Jersey Nets
- 1999: Cleveland Cavaliers
- 1999: Orlando Magic
- 2000: Cleveland Cavaliers
- 2000–2002: Los Angeles Clippers
- 2002–2003: Golden State Warriors
- 2003–2007: Denver Nuggets
- 2007: Milwaukee Bucks
- 2008: Charlotte Bobcats
- 2008–2009: Virtus Bologna
- 2009–2010: Washington Wizards
- 2010–2011: Milwaukee Bucks
- 2012: Houston Rockets

Career highlights
- EuroChallenge champion (2009); Frances Pomeroy Naismith Award (1998); AP Honorable mention All-American (1998); MAC tournament MVP (1998); 2× First-team All-MAC (1997, 1998); Second-team All-MAC (1996); MAC All-Freshman Team (1995); No. 11 retired by Eastern Michigan Eagles; USA Basketball Male Athlete of the Year (1997)

Career NBA statistics
- Points: 5,791 (8.9 ppg)
- Rebounds: 877 (1.3 rpg)
- Assists: 2,092 (3.2 apg)
- Stats at NBA.com
- Stats at Basketball Reference
Medals
Men's basketball
Representing United States
Summer Universiade
Gold medal – first place	1997 Trapani	Team competition

Earl Antoine Boykins (born June 2, 1976) is an American basketball coach and former professional player who is an assistant coach for the USC Trojans men's team. He played thirteen seasons in the National Basketball Association (NBA) for the New Jersey Nets, Cleveland Cavaliers, Orlando Magic, Los Angeles Clippers, Golden State Warriors, Denver Nuggets, Milwaukee Bucks, Charlotte Bobcats, Washington Wizards and Houston Rockets. Standing at 5 feet 5 inches (1.65 m) in height, Boykins is the second-shortest player in NBA history behind Muggsy Bogues. He also played in the Continental Basketball Association (CBA) and overseas in Italy.

Boykins started his coaching career as the head coach for the Douglas County High School boys varsity basketball team from 2013 to 2019. He was an assistant coach for the UTEP Miners from 2021 to 2025. Boykins joined USC in 2025.

== Early life ==
Boykins was born in Cleveland, Ohio in 1976. As a child his 5' 8" father, Willie Williams, would sneak Boykins into a gym in his gym bag. Boykins grew up playing in recreational leagues with his father and other grown men. Boykins played high school basketball at Cleveland Central Catholic High School where he averaged 24.6 points per game and led the school to a 23–2 record as a senior. In 2015, The Plain Dealer ranked him the best Cleveland-area high school basketball player of the 1990s. Eastern Michigan and Iowa were the only two Division I basketball programs to offer Boykins an athletic scholarship, though Iowa later withdrew its offer.

== College career ==
Boykins played college basketball at Eastern Michigan University from 1994 to 1998. Eastern Michigan won the MAC tournament in 1996 and 1998. He earned All-Mid-American Conference first-team honors in his junior and senior year. Also, during his senior season, Boykins was second in the NCAA Men's Division I Basketball Championship in scoring, with an average of 26.8 points per game. He holds the career record for total assists (624) at Eastern Michigan University. In his last game he scored 18 points in a losing effort to Michigan State. On February 27, 2011, Boykins' No. 11 jersey was retired and raised to the rafters in a ceremony at Eastern Michigan University's Convocation Center.

== Professional career ==
=== First NBA stint ===
Boykins was never drafted by an NBA team, but he was signed to short-term contracts by five different NBA teams before signing a five-year, $13.7 million contract with the Denver Nuggets prior to the 2003–2004 season. On November 11, 2004, Boykins scored 32 points in a 117–109 Nuggets' home win over the Detroit Pistons, making him the shortest player in NBA history to score 30 or more points during a game. After spending three full seasons and a portion of a fourth season with Denver, Boykins was traded to the Milwaukee Bucks in January 2007. After finishing the season in Milwaukee, Boykins opted out of his contract; he later signed with the Charlotte Bobcats partway through the 2007–2008 season and finished the season there.

=== Italy ===
Following the 2007–08 NBA season, Boykins was an unrestricted free agent. Instead of signing with an NBA team, he decided to play basketball in Europe and signed a one-year, $3.5 million net income contract with Virtus Bologna of the Italian A League. The one-year deal made Boykins the highest-paid basketball player in the Italian League and included income from Bologna's sponsorship and marketing arms, which is not an option for NBA players because of salary-cap restrictions.

On December 26, 2008, it was announced by Virtus owner Claudio Sabatini that Boykins was cut from the club due to behavioral issues after Boykins flew home to the United States in order to see his sick son. However, a few days later, thanks to the intervention of Virtus general manager Andrea Luchi, it was announced that Boykins was staying with the club. On April 26, 2009, his team won the EuroChallenge Cup by defeating Cholet Basket. In June 2009, he was released by Virtus.

=== Return to NBA ===
Boykins signed with the Washington Wizards in November 2009, making his return to the National Basketball Association. Boykins was a much-needed addition to the Wizards, after guards Gilbert Arenas and Javaris Crittenton were suspended for the remainder of the current season after a misdemeanor gun possession charge stemming from a locker room incident. In the December 2, 2009, game against the Milwaukee Bucks, Boykins sank two free throws to clinch the Wizards' victory.

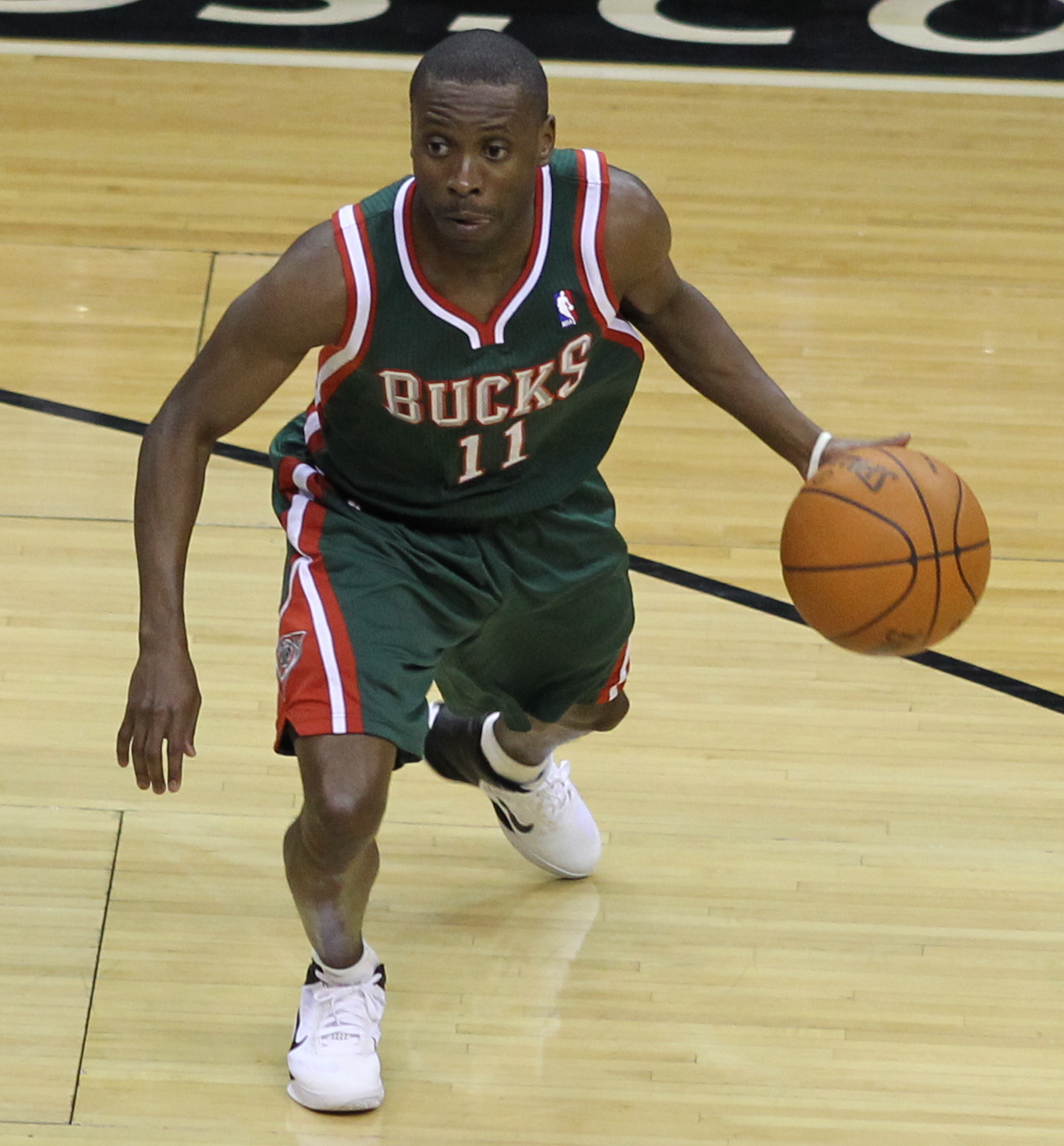
Boykins with the Milwaukee Bucks in 2011

On August 19, 2010, the Bucks signed him to a one-year deal. Boykins signed a 10-day contract with the Houston Rockets on March 26, 2012. Boykins has not played in the NBA since.

== The Basketball Tournament (TBT) ==
In the summer of 2017, Boykins competed in The Basketball Tournament on ESPN for Paul Champions. Competing for the $2 million grand prize, Boykins helped lead his team to two victories in the TBT Jamboree which secured Paul Champions' spot as one of the 64 teams in the tournament. During the Jamboree, Boykins averaged 24.5 points, 4.0 assists and 3.5 rebounds per game. In their first-round match up, Boykins scored a game-high 25 points, helping the Champions to a 78–74 victory over the Talladega Knights; a team led by former NBA players Josh Boone and Gary Forbes. Boykins and the Champions would eventually fall in the second-round to the number one seeded Untouchables.

== Career statistics ==
Legend
GP	Games played	GS	Games started	MPG	Minutes per game
FG%	Field goal percentage	3P%	3-point field goal percentage	FT%	Free throw percentage
RPG	Rebounds per game	APG	Assists per game	SPG	Steals per game
BPG	Blocks per game	PPG	Points per game	**Bold**	Career high

=== NBA ===
==== Regular season ====
Year	Team	GP	GS	MPG	FG%	3P%	FT%	RPG	APG	SPG	BPG	PPG
1998–99	New Jersey	5	0	10.2	.476	.200	.000	.8	1.2	.2	.0	4.2
1998–99	Cleveland	17	0	10.0	.345	.154	.667	.8	1.6	.3	.0	2.6
1999–00	Orlando	1	0	8.0	**.750**	.000	.000	1.0	3.0	.0	.0	6.0
1999–00	Cleveland	25	0	10.1	.473	.400	.783	1.0	1.8	.5	.0	5.3
2000–01	L.A. Clippers	10	0	14.9	.397	.125	.824	1.1	3.2	.5	.0	6.5
2001–02	L.A. Clippers	68	2	11.2	.400	.310	.770	.8	2.1	.3	.0	4.1
2002–03	Golden State	68	0	19.4	.429	.377	.865	1.3	3.3	.6	**.1**	8.8
2003–04	Denver	**82**	3	22.5	.419	.322	.877	1.7	3.6	.6	.0	10.2
2004–05	Denver	**82**	5	26.4	.413	.337	**.921**	1.7	**4.5**	**1.0**	**.1**	12.4
2005–06	Denver	60	0	25.7	.410	.346	.874	1.4	3.8	.8	**.1**	12.6
2006–07	Denver	31	4	28.3	.413	.373	.908	2.0	4.3	.8	**.1**	**15.2**
2006–07	Milwaukee	35	**19**	**33.0**	.427	**.419**	.886	**2.2**	**4.5**	.9	.0	14.0
2007–08	Charlotte	36	0	16.0	.355	.318	.831	.9	2.7	.4	.0	5.1
2009–10	Washington	67	1	16.7	.427	.317	.865	1.1	2.6	.4	.0	6.6
2010–11	Milwaukee	57	0	15.1	.443	.380	.841	1.0	2.5	.7	**.1**	7.2
2011–12	Houston	8	0	13.9	.333	.222	.867	1.4	2.1	.1	.0	4.9
Career		652	34	19.9	.417	.348	.876	1.3	3.2	.6	.1	8.9

==== Playoffs ====
Year	Team	GP	GS	MPG	FG%	3P%	FT%	RPG	APG	SPG	BPG	PPG
2004	Denver	**5**	0	24.2	**.444**	**.357**	.857	**2.4**	3.8	**1.0**	**.2**	13.4
2005	Denver	**5**	**1**	**30.4**	.397	.000	**.895**	1.0	3.8	.8	**.2**	**14.2**
2006	Denver	**5**	0	28.0	.322	.211	.795	1.4	**4.0**	.8	.0	11.0
Career		15	1	27.5	.389	.225	.837	1.6	3.9	.9	.1	12.9

=== College ===
Year	Team	GP	GS	MPG	FG%	3P%	FT%	RPG	APG	SPG	BPG	PPG
1994–95	Eastern Michigan	30	30	32.5	.413	.343	.703	**2.4**	4.5	1.7	**.1**	12.5
1995–96	Eastern Michigan	31	31	33.3	.432	.307	.804	2.3	**5.8**	**1.9**	**.1**	15.5
1996–97	Eastern Michigan	**32**	**32**	36.3	.423	.300	**.852**	2.1	4.6	**1.9**	.0	19.1
1997–98	Eastern Michigan	29	29	**36.9**	**.472**	**.407**	.816	2.3	5.5	**1.9**	**.1**	**25.7**
Career		122	122	34.8	.439	.353	.803	2.3	5.1	1.8	.1	18.1

== Coaching career ==
In 2014, Boykins was hired as the head coach of the Douglas County High School boys varsity team in Castle Rock, Colorado. He served as the director of student-athlete development for the Arkansas Razorbacks under head coach Eric Musselman from 2019 to 2021.

In 2021, Boykins was hired as an assistant coach with the UTEP Miners.

On May 30, 2025, Boykins joined the USC Trojans as an assistant for head coach Musselman.

== See also ==
- List of National Basketball Association career free throw percentage leaders
