= Dick Hunsaker =

American basketball coach (born 1954)

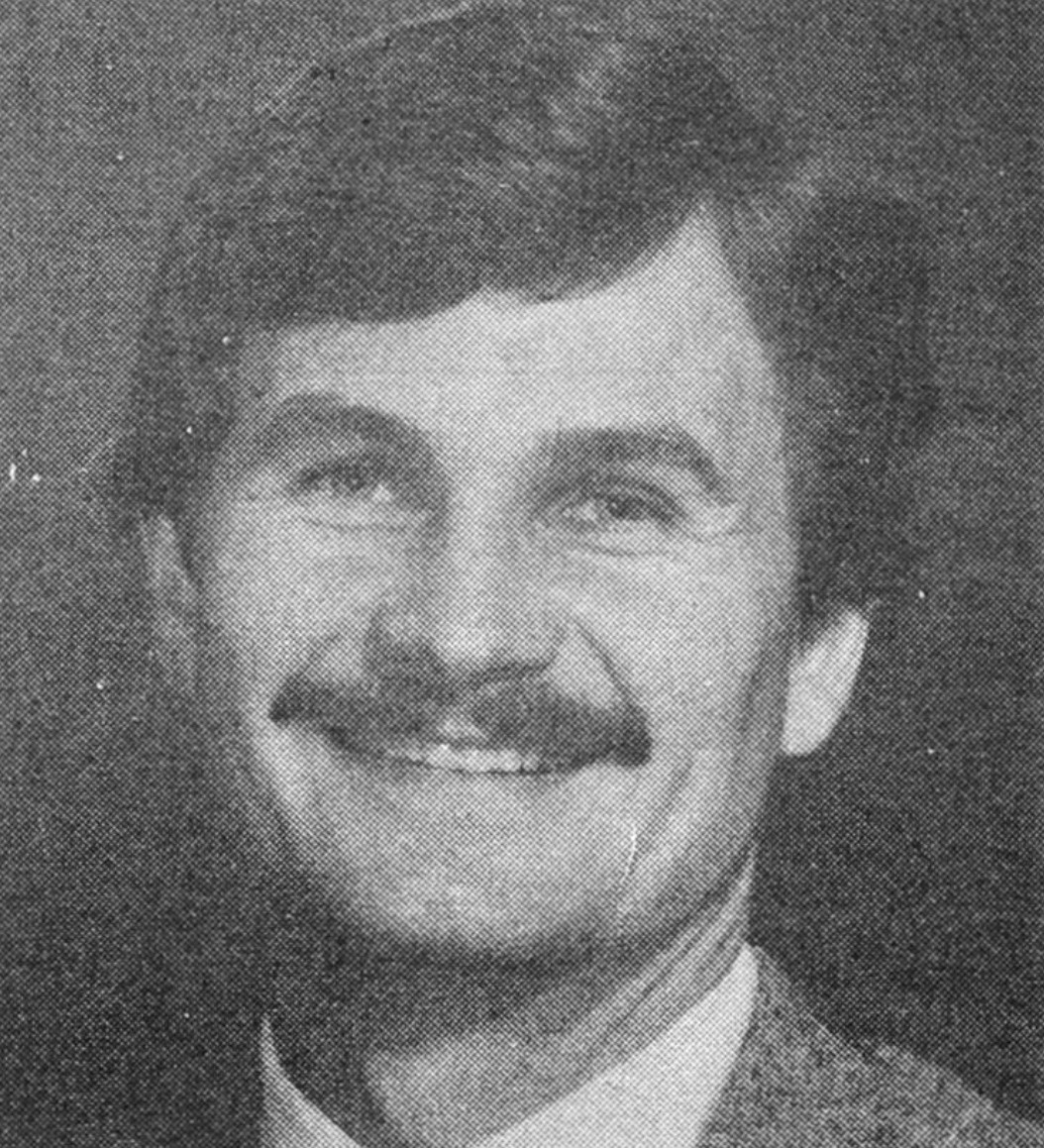
- Hunsaker, circa 1984

Biographical details
- Born: April 11, 1954 (age 72)

Playing career
- 1972–1973: UTEP
- 1974–1977: Weber State

Coaching career (HC unless noted)
- 1977–1987: Weber State (assistant)
- 1987–1989: Ball State (assistant)
- 1989–1993: Ball State
- 1993–1994: Hartford Hellcats
- 1994–1995: Grand Rapids Hoops
- 1995–1998: Manchester
- 1998–2000: Utah (assistant)
- 2000–2001: Utah (interim HC)
- 2002–2015: Utah Valley

Head coaching record
- Overall: 371–226 (college)
- Tournaments: 2–2 (NCAA Division I); 0–3 (NIT); 0—1 (CIT)

Accomplishments and honors

Championships
- 2 MAC regular season (1990, 1993); 2 MAC tournament (1990, 1993); MWC regular season (2001); 2 GWC regular season (2011, 2012); WAC regular season (2014)

Awards
- MWC Coach of the Year (2001); 2× GWC Coach of the Year (2011, 2012); WAC Coach of the Year (2014)

Dick Hunsaker (born April 11, 1954) is an American college basketball coach and the former head men's basketball coach at Utah Valley University. He is also a former head and assistant coach at Ball State University. As one of Rick Majerus's assistant coaches, he worked with the Cardinals for two seasons, including their berth in the 1989 NCAA Division I men's basketball tournament.

Hunsaker is best known for leading Ball State to the 1990 tournament. His team was led by University of Arkansas at Little Rock transfers Paris McCurdy and Curtis Kidd, Muncie natives Chandler Thompson and Billy Butts, and Detroit native Scott Nichols. The team, as a number 12 seed, defeated Oregon State University, which was led by Gary Payton in the first round and University of Louisville in the second round, before falling to eventual champions UNLV. His record while at Ball State was 97–33.

Hunsaker left Ball State in 1993 in the midst of an NCAA Investigation, but claims to have never violated any rules. He coached the next two years in the Continental Basketball Association with Fort Wayne, Hartford and Grand Rapids. In 1995, he returned to the collegiate coaching ranks at Manchester College, where his record was 51–27.

His next coaching job was at the University of Utah, where he served as an assistant to Rick Majerus in his final years. Majerus took a leave of absence after the 2000–01 season opener due to health problems, and Hunsaker became interim head coach. Majerus had every intention of returning, but announced in January 2001 that he would sit out the remainder of the season to tend to his health and that of his mother. As acting head coach in 2001, Hunsaker led the Utes to an 18–12 record. He took the head coaching position at Utah Valley State in 2002. His first season at Utah Valley State was the school's last year as a junior college. Utah Valley joined Division I in 2009.

Hunsaker is a Latter Day Saint.

== Playing career ==
Hunsaker enrolled at UTEP in 1972. However, he transferred to Weber State after one year. He graduated from Weber State in 1977. He received a master's degree from BYU.

== Head coaching record ==
Record table
Season	Team	Overall	Conference	Standing	Postseason
Ball State Cardinals (Mid-American Conference) (1989–1993)
1989–90	Ball State	26–7	13–3	1st	NCAA Division I Sweet 16
1990–91	Ball State	21–10	10–6	3rd	
1991–92	Ball State	24–9	11–5	2nd	NIT First Round
1992–93	Ball State	26–8	14–4	1st	NCAA Division I First Round
Ball State:		97–34 (.740)	48–18 (.727)		
Manchester Spartans (Heartland Collegiate Athletic Conference) (1995–1998)
1995–96	Manchester	19–8	8–4	2nd	
1996–97	Manchester	16–10	7–5	3rd	
1997–98	Manchester	16–9	7–5	T–3rd	
Manchester:		51–27 (.654)	22–14 (.611)		
Utah Utes (Mountain West Conference) (2000–2001)
2000–01	Utah	18–12	10–4	1st	NIT First Round
Utah:		18–12 (.600)	10–4 (.714)		
Utah Valley Wolverines (NCAA Division I independent) (2003–2009)
2003–04	Utah Valley	23–5			
2004–05	Utah Valley	16–12			
2005–06	Utah Valley	16–13			
2006–07	Utah Valley	22–7			
2007–08	Utah Valley	15–14			
2008–09	Utah Valley	17–11			
Utah Valley Wolverines (Great West Conference) (2009–2013)
2009–10	Utah Valley	12–18	5–7	4th	
2010–11	Utah Valley	19–11	11–1	1st	
2011–12	Utah Valley	20–13	9–1	1st	CIT First Round
2012–13	Utah Valley	14–18	3–5	3rd	
Utah Valley Wolverines (Western Athletic Conference) (2013–2015)
2013–14	Utah Valley	20–12	13–3	1st	NIT First Round
2014–15	Utah Valley	11–19	5–9	6th	
Utah Valley:		205–153 (.573)	46–26 (.639)		
Total:		371–226 (.621)			
National champion Postseason invitational champion Conference regular season champion Conference regular season and conference tournament champion Division regular season champion Division regular season and conference tournament champion Conference tournament champion
