= 1994 MAC men's basketball tournament =

- Classification: Division I
- Season: 1993–94
- Teams: 8
- First round site: Campus Arenas; Campus Sites
- Finals site: Battelle Hall; Columbus, Ohio
- Champions: Ohio (3rd title)
- Winning coach: Larry Hunter (1st title)
- MVP: Gary Trent (Ohio)
- MAC men's basketball tournaments

1993–94 Mid-American Conference men's basketball standings
	Conf.				Overall
Team	W		L	PCT	W		L	PCT
Ohio †	14	–	4	.778	25	–	8	.758
Bowling Green	12	–	6	.667	18	–	10	.643
Miami (OH)	12	–	6	.667	19	–	11	.633
Ball State	11	–	7	.611	16	–	12	.571
Toledo	10	–	8	.556	15	–	12	.556
Eastern Michigan	10	–	8	.556	15	–	12	.556
Kent State	8	–	10	.444	13	–	14	.481
Western Michigan	7	–	11	.389	14	–	14	.500
Central Michigan	4	–	14	.222	5	–	21	.192
Akron	2	–	16	.111	8	–	18	.308
† 1994 MAC tournament winner Rankings from AP Poll

The 1994 MAC men's basketball tournament took place on March 8–10, 1994 at Battelle Hall in Columbus, Ohio. Ohio defeated Miami (OH), 89–66 in the championship game, to win its third MAC Tournament title.

The Bobcats earned an automatic bid to the 1994 NCAA tournament as #12 seed in the East region. In the round of 64 Ohio fell to Indiana, 84–72.

== Format ==
Eight of ten conference members participated, with play beginning in the quarterfinal round. Central Michigan and Akron were left out of the tournament field.

== Bracket ==
Quarterfinals; March 8
1	Ohio	87
8	Western Michigan	56
4	Ball State	80
5	Toledo	73
3	Miami (OH)	90
6	Eastern Michigan	60
2	Bowling Green	68
7	Kent State	58

Semifinals; March 9
1	Ohio	79
4	Ball State	70
3	Miami (OH)	61
2	Bowling Green	59

Final; March 10
1	Ohio	89
3	Miami (OH)	66
