= 1993 MAC men's basketball tournament =

- Classification: Division I
- Season: 1992–93
- Teams: 8
- Site: Battelle Hall; Columbus, Ohio
- Champions: Ball State (5th title)
- Winning coach: Dick Hunsaker (2nd title)
- MVP: Steve Payne (Ball State)
- MAC men's basketball tournaments

1992–93 Mid-American Conference men's basketball standings
	Conf.				Overall
Team	W		L	PCT	W		L	PCT
Ball State †	14	–	4	.778	26	–	8	.765
Miami (OH)	14	–	4	.778	22	–	9	.710
Western Michigan	12	–	6	.667	17	–	12	.586
Ohio	11	–	7	.611	14	–	13	.519
Toledo	9	–	9	.500	12	–	16	.429
Eastern Michigan	8	–	10	.444	13	–	17	.433
Bowling Green	8	–	10	.444	11	–	16	.407
Kent State	7	–	11	.389	10	–	17	.370
Central Michigan	4	–	14	.222	8	–	18	.308
Akron	3	–	15	.167	8	–	18	.308
† 1993 MAC tournament winner Rankings from AP Poll

The 1993 MAC men's basketball tournament took place March 11–13, at Battelle Hall in Columbus, Ohio. Ball State defeated Western Michigan, 79–64 in the championship game, to win its fifth MAC Tournament title.

The Cardinals earned an automatic bid to the 1993 NCAA tournament as #15 seed in the Midwest region. In the round of 64, Ball State lost to Kansas, 94–72.

== Format ==
Eight of ten conference members participated, with play beginning in the quarterfinal round. Central Michigan and Akron were left out of the tournament field.

== Bracket ==
Quarterfinals; March 11
1	Ball State	77
8	Kent State	57
4	Ohio	84
5	Toledo	85
3	Western Michigan	65
6	Eastern Michigan	57
2	Miami (OH)	63
7	Bowling Green	50

Semifinals; March 12
1	Ball State	72
5	Toledo	64
3	Western Michigan	61
2	Miami (OH)	48

Final; March 13
1	Ball State	79
3	Western Michigan	64
