= Milton Barnes (basketball) =

American basketball coach

Personal information
- Born: November 29, 1957 (age 68) Oakley, Michigan, U.S.

Career information
- High school: Saginaw (Saginaw, Michigan)
- College: Albion (1975–1979)
- NBA draft: 1979: undrafted
- Coaching career: 1979–present

Career history

Coaching
- 1979–1980: Albion (assistant)
- 1980–1982: Kent State (assistant)
- 1982–1983: Detroit (assistant)
- 1983–1985: Eastern Michigan (assistant)
- 1985–1986: Detroit (assistant)
- 1986–1988: Minnesota (assistant)
- 1988–1991: Albion HS
- 1991–1996: Minnesota (assistant)
- 1996–2000: Eastern Michigan
- 2000–2001: Harlem Globetrotters
- 2001–2002: Greenville Groove
- 2007–2009: SMU (assistant)

Career highlights
- As player: First-team All-MIAA (1979); 2× Second-team All-MIAA (1977, 1978); As head coach: NBA Development League champion (2002); MAC tournament champion (1998)

Milton David Barnes (born November 29, 1957) is an American basketball coach who was the former head coach of the U.S. Virgin Islands national basketball team.

== Early life and education ==
Born in Oakley, Michigan, Barnes graduated from Saginaw High School in 1975 and Albion College in 1979. At Albion, Barnes played basketball for four seasons and led Albion to the 1978 Michigan Intercollegiate Athletic Association title and third place in the 1978 NCAA Division III tournament. He was selected to the All-Mid-America Intercollegiate Athletics Association (MIAA) first team in 1979, and the second team in 1977 and 1978.

Barnes was inducted in the Albion College Athletics Hall of Fame in 1995.

== Coaching career ==
He was an assistant coach at the University of Minnesota from 1986 to 1988 and 1991 to 1996 under Clem Haskins. He later became head coach of Albion High School, where he compiled a 65–11 record from 1988 to 1991, including a 26–1 record and a Class B state championship game appearance in his final season. Also, he is the former head coach of Eastern Michigan University and of the world famous Harlem Globetrotters. He was hired to coach the Greenville Groove in the first season of the NBA Developmental League, now known as the NBA G League. He went 36-20 and led the Groove to the league championship, making him the first coach to win a G League championship. Barnes was also associate head coach at SMU from 2007 to 2009.

In 2009, the Minnesota Timberwolves hired Barnes as a scout. In 2010, he became the men's basketball head coach of U.S. Virgin Islands national basketball team.

== Personal life ==
Barnes and his wife Lyn have three children; sons Andre and Milton Jr. and a daughter Alexis. His son Andre is a student-athlete in track and field at Michigan.

== Head coaching record ==
=== College ===
Record table
Season	Team	Overall	Conference	Standing	Postseason
Eastern Michigan Eagles (Mid-American Conference) (1996–2000)
1996–97	Eastern Michigan	22–10	11–7	4th	
1997–98	Eastern Michigan	20–10	13–5	3rd (West)	NCAA First Round
1998–99	Eastern Michigan	5–20	5–13	5th (West)	
1999–00	Eastern Michigan	15–13	9–9	3rd (West)	
Eastern Michigan:		62–53 (.539)	38–34 (.528)		
Total:		62–53 (.539)			
National champion Postseason invitational champion Conference regular season champion Conference regular season and conference tournament champion Division regular season champion Division regular season and conference tournament champion Conference tournament champion

=== Professional ===
Legend
Regular season	G	Games coached	W	Games won	L	Games lost	W–L %	Win–loss %
Playoffs	PG	Playoff games	PW	Playoff wins	PL	Playoff losses	PW–L %	Playoff win–loss %

Team	Year	G	W	L	W–L%	Finish	PG	PW	PL	PW–L%	Result
Greenville	2001–02	56	36	20	.643	1st in NBDL	5	4	1	.800	Won NBDL Championship
Career		56	36	20	.643		5	4	1	.800	
