= 1997–98 Ohio Bobcats men's basketball team =

American college basketball season

1997–98 Ohio Bobcats men's basketball
- Conference: Mid-American Conference
- East Division
- Record: 5–21 (3–15 MAC)
- Head coach: Larry Hunter (9th season)
- Assistant coaches: Mike Elfers; James Jones; Kevin Eckert
- Home arena: Convocation Center

1997–98 Mid-American Conference men's basketball standings
	Conf.				Overall
Team	W		L	PCT	W		L	PCT
East
Akron	13	–	5	.722	17	–	10	.630
Kent State	9	–	9	.500	13	–	17	.433
Miami	9	–	9	.500	17	–	12	.586
Marshall	7	–	11	.389	11	–	16	.407
Bowling Green	7	–	11	.389	10	–	16	.385
Ohio	3	–	15	.167	5	–	21	.192
West
Ball State	14	–	4	.778	21	–	8	.724
Western Michigan	14	–	4	.778	21	–	8	.724
Eastern Michigan †	13	–	5	.722	20	–	10	.667
Toledo	10	–	8	.556	15	–	12	.556
Northern Illinois	6	–	12	.333	10	–	16	.385
Central Michigan	3	–	15	.167	5	–	21	.192
† 1998 MAC tournament winner Rankings from AP Poll

The 1997–98 Ohio Bobcats men's basketball team represented Ohio University in the college basketball season of 1997–98. The team was coached by Larry Hunter and played their home games at the Convocation Center. They finished the season 5–21 and finished tied for last in the MAC regular season with a conference record of 3–15. 21 losses is the most in Ohio history.

== Roster ==
1997–98 Ohio Bobcats men's basketball team
Players
Coaches

Pos.	#	Name	Height	Weight	Year	Hometown
G/F	30	Sanjay Adell	6 ft 6 in (1.98 m)	230 lb (104 kg)	Fr	Milwaukee, WI
F	44	Jason Bundy	6 ft 4 in (1.93 m)	220 lb (100 kg)	So	Heath, OH
F	54	Ryan Connolly	6 ft 3 in (1.91 m)	215 lb (98 kg)	Fr
F	33	Basra Fakhir	6 ft 5 in (1.96 m)	240 lb (109 kg)	So	East Cleveland, OH
G	12	Chet Feldman	6 ft 0 in (1.83 m)	190 lb (86 kg)	Fr	Munroe Falls, OH
F	32	Diante Flenorl	6 ft 9 in (2.06 m)	215 lb (98 kg)	So	Milwaukee, WI
G	4	Dustin Ford	5 ft 10 in (1.78 m)	180 lb (82 kg)	Fr	Cambridge, OH
F	34	Seth Martin	6 ft 7 in (2.01 m)	230 lb (104 kg)	Fr	Zanesville, OH
F	45	Chris Maul	6 ft 6 in (1.98 m)	190 lb (86 kg)	Fr	Hilliard, OH
G	22	Jim Peterson	6 ft 5 in (1.96 m)	215 lb (98 kg)	So	Beaver Falls, PA
G	10	Corey Reed	5 ft 10 in (1.78 m)	175 lb (79 kg)	Jr	Milwaukee, WI
G	21	Steve Spears	6 ft 3 in (1.91 m)	210 lb (95 kg)	Fr	Galloway, OH
C	52	Nick Terry	6 ft 11 in (2.11 m)	260 lb (118 kg)	Fr	Mount Gilead, OH

Head coach

- Larry Hunter

Assistant coach(es)

- Mike Elfers
- James Jones
- Kevin Eckert

Legend

- (C) Team captain
- (S) Suspended
- (I) Ineligible
- (W) Walk-on
- Injured
- Current redshirt

Roster
Last update: July 4, 2014

== Schedule ==
Date time, TV	Rank^{#}	Opponent^{#}	Result	Record	Site (attendance) city, state
Non-conference regular season
11/29/1997*		at Wright State	W 57–56 ^{OT}	1–0	
12/2/1997*		at Radford	L 63–72 ^{OT}	1–1	Dedmon Center; Radford, VA
12/5/1997*		vs. St. Bonaventure; Marquette Tournament	L 46–59	1–2	
12/6/1997*		vs. Montana State; Marquette Tournament	L 66–82	1–3	
12/10/1997		at Kent State	L 52–63	1–4 (0–1)	Memorial Gym; Kent, OH
12/13/1997*		at West Virginia	L 63–89	1–5	WVU Coliseum; Morgantown, WV
12/17/1997*		Cal State Northridge	W 79–77	2–5	Convocation Center; Athens, OH
12/20/1997		Akron	L 55–69	2–6 (0–2)	Convocation Center; Athens, OH
12/23/1997*		at No. 22 Rhode Island	L 72–85	2–7	Keaney Gymnasium; Kingston, RI
12/30/1997*; 7:00 pm, BBSN		No. 6 Kentucky	L 58–95	2–8	Convocation Center (13,083); Athens, OH
MAC regular season
1/3/1998		at Eastern Michigan	L 64–85	2–9 (0–3)	Bowen Field House; Ypsilanti, MI
1/5/1998		at Toledo	L 46–57	2–10 (0–4)	Savage Hall; Toledo, OH
1/8/1998		Ball State	L 69–75	2–11 (0–5)	Convocation Center; Athens, OH
1/10/1998		Northern Illinois	W 73–57	3–11 (1–5)	Convocation Center; Athens, OH
1/17/1998		at Marshall	L 73–78	3-12 (1–6)	Cam Henderson Center; Huntington, WV
1/21/1998		Bowling Green	L 58–71	3-13 (1–7)	Convocation Center; Athens, OH
1/24/1998		at Miami (OH)	L 58–73	3–14 (1–8)	Millett Hall; Oxford, OH
1/29/1998		at Northern Illinois	L 47–85	3–15 (1–9)	Chick Evans Field House; DeKalb, IL
1/31/1998		at Ball State	L 57–106	3–16 (1–10)	University Arena; Muncie, IN
2/5/1998		Central Michigan	W 122–121 ^{2OT}	4–16 (2–10)	Convocation Center; Athens, OH
2/7/1998; 3:00 pm		Western Michigan	L 68–86	4–17 (2–11)	Convocation Center; Athens, OH
2/14/1998		Marshall	L 63–72	4–18 (2–12)	Convocation Center; Athens, OH
2/18/1998		Miami (OH)	L 53–85	4–19 (2–13)	Convocation Center; Athens, OH
2/21/1998		at Bowling Green	L 60–69	4–20 (2–14)	Anderson Arena; Bowling Green, OH
2/23/1998		at Akron	L 65–86	4–21 (2–15)	Rhodes Arena; Akron, OH
2/25/1998		Kent State	W 76–61	5–21 (3–15)	Convocation Center; Athens, OH
*Non-conference game. ^{#}Rankings from AP Poll. (#) Tournament seedings in parentheses. All times are in Eastern Time.

== Statistics ==
=== Team statistics ===
Final 1997–98 statistics

Record	Ohio	OPP
Scoring	1663	2014
Scoring Average	63.96	77.46
Field goals – Att	596–1452	681–1507
3-pt. Field goals – Att	117–399	160–420
Free throws – Att	354–558	492–687
Rebounds	961	938
Assists	326	356
Turnovers	509	348
Steals	122	254
Blocked Shots	60	79

=== Player statistics ===
			Minutes		Scoring		Total FGs			3-point FGs			Free-Throws			Rebounds								
Player	GP	GS	Tot	Avg	Pts	Avg	FG	FGA	Pct	3FG	3FA	Pct	FT	FTA	Pct	Off	Def	Tot	Avg	A	PF	TO	Stl	Blk
Sanjay Adell	25	-	-	-	403	16.1	140	326	0.429	15	57	0.263	108	166	0.651	0	0	151	6	54	0	0	19	11
Jim Peterson	26	-	-	-	284	10.9	90	257	0.35	71	209	0.34	33	44	0.75	0	0	58	2.2	15	0	0	10	0
Diante Flenorl	25	-	-	-	280	11.2	117	261	0.448	3	14	0.214	43	80	0.538	0	0	197	7.9	50	0	0	14	19
Basra Fakhir	26	-	-	-	219	8.4	90	170	0.529	0	1	0	39	64	0.609	0	0	205	7.9	31	0	0	10	5
Dustin Ford	26	-	-	-	216	8.3	66	214	0.308	22	83	0.265	62	79	0.785	0	0	77	3	85	0	0	31	2
Seth Martin	26	-	-	-	117	4.5	48	95	0.505	0	0	0	21	45	0.467	0	0	73	2.8	16	0	0	9	5
Nick Terry	25	-	-	-	70	2.8	24	42	0.571	0	0	0	22	39	0.564	0	0	42	1.7	9	0	0	1	17
Chet Feldman	26	-	-	-	40	1.5	12	49	0.245	6	33	0.182	10	17	0.588	0	0	46	1.8	44	0	0	15	1
Corey Reed	5	-	-	-	27	5.4	7	27	0.259	0	1	0	13	20	0.65	0	0	17	3.4	22	0	0	12	0
Jason Bundy	8	-	-	-	5	0.6	1	5	0.2	0	0	0	3	4	0.75	0	0	4	0.5	0	0	0	1	0
Steve Spears	7	-	-	-	2	0.3	1	4	0.25	0	1	0	0	0	0	0	0	5	0.7	0	0	0	0	0
Ryan Connolly	2	-	-	-	0	0	0	0	0	0	0	0	0	0	0	0	0	1	0.5	0	0	0	0	0
Chris Maul	3	-	-	-	0	0	0	2	0	0	0	0	0	0	0	0	0	1	0.3	0	0	0	0	0
Total	26	-	-	-	1663	64.0	596	1452	0.410	117	399	0.293	354	558	0.634	378	583	961	37.0	326	556	509	122	60
Opponents	26	-	-	-	2014	77.5	681	1507	0.452	160	420	0.381	492	687	0.716	338	600	938	36.1	356	530	348	254	79

Legend
GP	Games played	GS	Games started	Avg	Average per game
FG	Field-goals made	FGA	Field-goal attempts	Off	Offensive rebounds
Def	Defensive rebounds	A	Assists	TO	Turnovers
Blk	Blocks	Stl	Steals	High	Team high
