= 1996 MAC men's basketball tournament =

- Classification: Division I
- Season: 1995–96
- Teams: 8
- Site: SeaGate Centre; Toledo, Ohio
- Champions: Eastern Michigan (3rd title)
- Winning coach: Ben Braun (3rd title)
- MVP: Brian Tolbert (Eastern Michigan)
- MAC men's basketball tournaments

1995–96 Mid-American Conference men's basketball standings
	Conf.				Overall
Team	W		L	PCT	W		L	PCT
Eastern Michigan †	14	–	4	.778	25	–	6	.806
Western Michigan	13	–	5	.722	15	–	12	.556
Miami	12	–	6	.667	21	–	8	.724
Ohio	11	–	7	.611	16	–	14	.533
Ball State	11	–	7	.611	16	–	12	.571
Bowling Green	9	–	9	.500	14	–	13	.519
Toledo	9	–	9	.500	18	–	14	.563
Kent State	8	–	10	.444	14	–	13	.519
Central Michigan	3	–	15	.167	6	–	20	.231
Akron	0	–	18	.000	3	–	23	.115
† 1996 MAC tournament winner Rankings from AP Poll

The 1996 MAC men's basketball tournament, a part of the 1995–96 NCAA Division I men's basketball season, took place at SeaGate Centre in Toledo, Ohio. Its winner received the Mid-American Conference's automatic bid to the 1996 NCAA tournament. It was a single-elimination tournament with three rounds and the top eight MAC teams invited to participate. No teams received byes in the tournament. Eastern Michigan received the number one seed in the tournament.

== Tournament ==
=== Seeds ===
1. Eastern Michigan
2. Western Michigan
3. Miami
4. Ohio
5. Ball State
6. Bowling Green
7. Toledo
8. Kent State

=== Bracket ===
Quarterfinals
1	Eastern Michigan	84
8	Kent State	72
4	Ohio	80
5	Ball State	86
3	Miami	81
6	Bowling Green	53
2	Western Michigan	65
7	Toledo	71

Semifinals
1	Eastern Michigan	87
5	Ball State	71
3	Miami	55
7	Toledo	75

Finals
1	Eastern Michigan	77
7	Toledo	63
