= Cleveland Central Catholic High School =

Catholic, coeducational college prep school in Cleveland, Ohio, United States

Cleveland Central Catholic
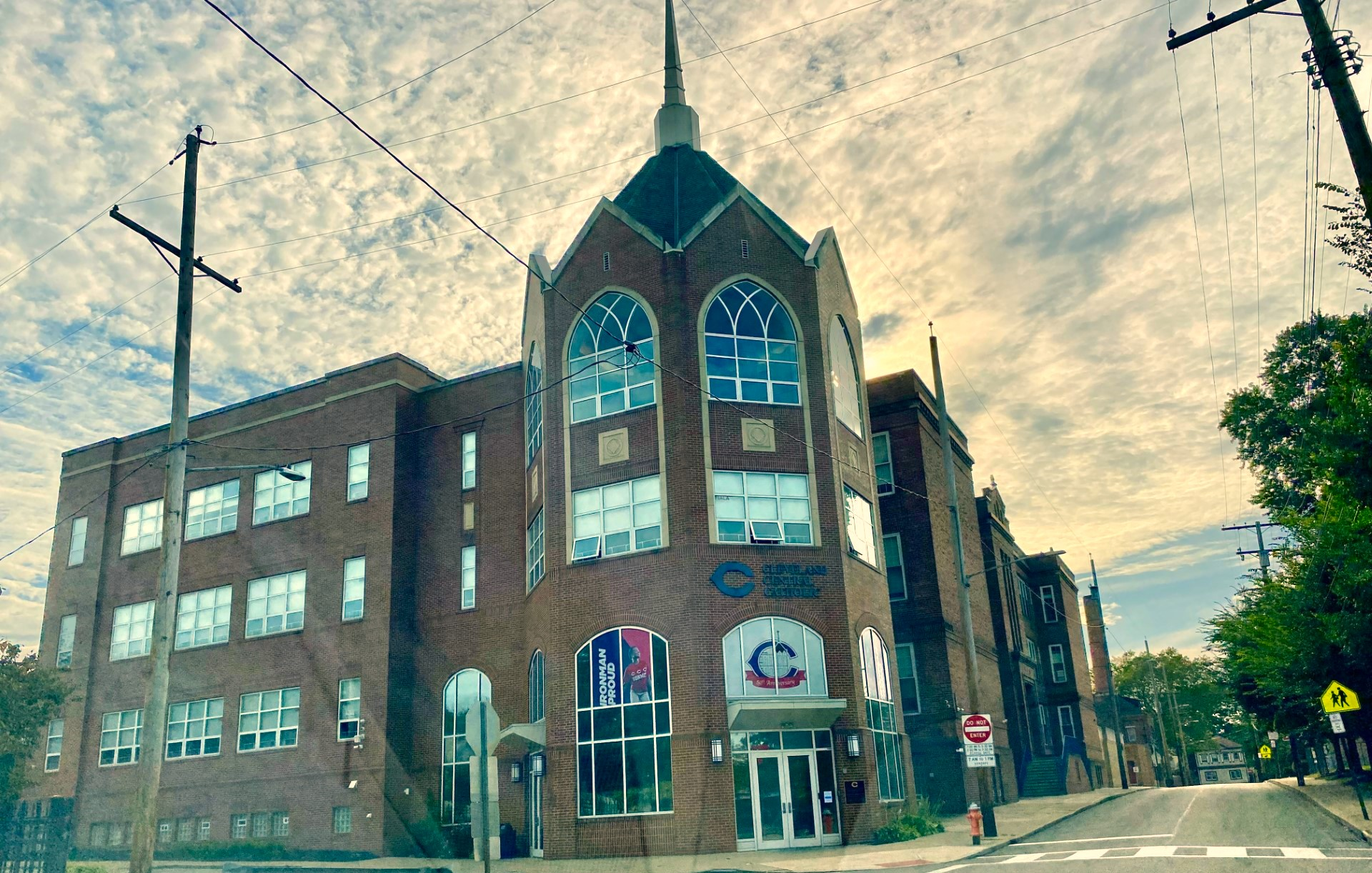

Location
- 6550 Baxter Avenue; Cleveland, (Cuyahoga County), Ohio 44105-1255; United States; 41°27′33″N 81°38′38″W

Information
- Type: Catholic, Coeducational College Prep
- Motto: Creative in Mind and Spirit
- Religious affiliation: Roman Catholic
- Established: 1968
- Oversight: Roman Catholic Diocese of Cleveland
- President: Deborale Richardson-Phillips, PHD
- Principal: Allison Marie Gustanovic, SND
- Enrollment: 430 (2022)
- Campus: Urban
- Colors: Red, white and blue
- Athletics conference: North Coast League
- Mascot: Ironmen
- Accreditation: North Central Association of Colleges and Schools
- Newspaper: The Millwrite
- Yearbook: The Ingot
- Website: https://www.centralcatholichs.org

Cleveland Central Catholic High School is a private co-educational high school located in Cleveland, Ohio. It is run by the Roman Catholic Diocese of Cleveland. It is a member of the North Central Association, the Notre Dame Education Association, and the National Catholic Education Association.

== History ==
Cleveland Central Catholic was formed by the merger of 4 Roman Catholic Cleveland high schools - St. John Cantius, Lourdes Central, St. Michael the Archangel, and St. Stanislaus. Its first year of operation was the 1969-1970 scholastic year.

== Clubs and activities ==
Student clubs include: Academic Challenge Team, Chess Club, Class Councils, Spanish Club, National Honor Society, Liturgical Music, SADD, Drama Club, and Intramural Sports.

The school's Latin Club functions as a local chapter of both the Ohio Junior Classical League (OJCL) and National Junior Classical League (NJCL).

== Ohio High School Athletic Association State Championships ==
- Girls basketball – 2007
- Boys basketball – 2009

== Notable alumni ==
- Vanessa Bell Calloway – actress
- Earl Boykins – NBA player, 1999–2012
- Delbert Cowsette – NFL player for the Chicago Bears
- Jantel Lavender – WNBA player for the Los Angeles Sparks
- Jayson Wells (born 1976) – basketball player
- Bill Wertz – Major League Baseball player
- Eric Wilkerson – football player
