= Battelle Grand =

Exhibit hall located in Columbus, Ohio

Coordinates: 39.9716°N 83.0005°W

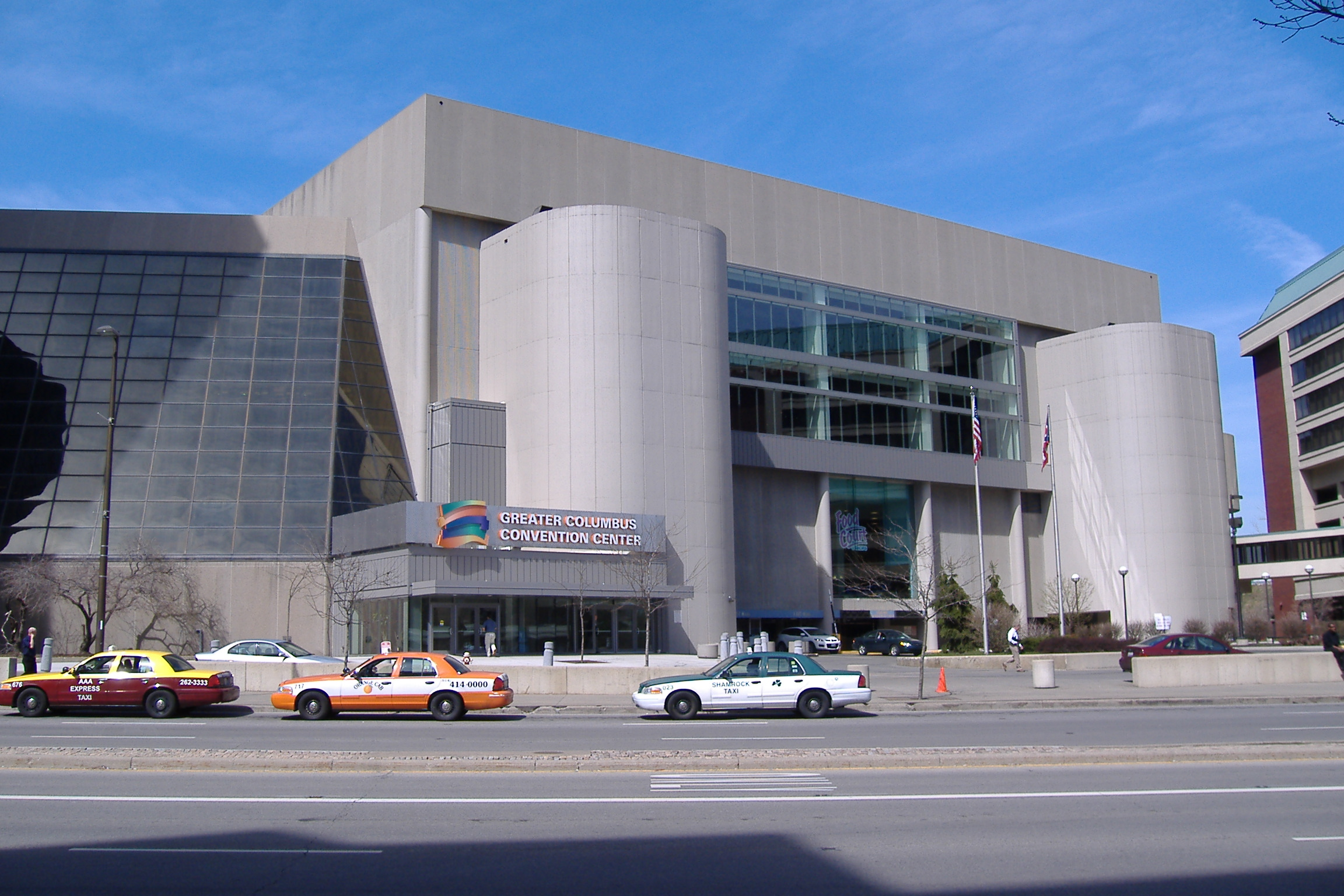
- GCCC South Building containing Battelle Grand in Columbus, Ohio 43215
- Interactive map of Battelle Grand
- Former names: Battelle Hall
- Location: 400 North High Street
- Owner: Battelle Commons Co.
- Operator: Battelle Commons Co.
- Capacity: 6,864
- Public transit: 1, 2, 5, 6, 9, 13, AirConnect, CMAX, Night Owl; CoGo

Construction
- Groundbreaking: February 1978
- Opened: September 10, 1980
- Cost: $36.5 million
- Architect: Godwin Böhm NBBJ

Tenants
- Columbus Capitals (AISA) (1984-1986); Columbus Horizon (CBA) (1992-1994); Columbus Invaders (NPSL) (1996-1997); Columbus Quest (ABL) (1996-1998)

Battelle Grand (originally known as Battelle Hall) is a 6,864 seat multi-purpose exhibit hall located in Columbus, Ohio, part of the South Building at the Greater Columbus Convention Center. It opened as Battelle Hall as part of the Ohio Center on September 10, 1980, and although sometimes considered a white elephant because of its small size and seating capacity (concert fans usually found themselves driving to Cincinnati Riverfront Coliseum, Indianapolis Market Square Arena, Detroit Joe Louis Arena, Cleveland Richfield Coliseum or Pittsburgh Mellon Arena), it has been used for a variety of events, including concerts (Conway Twitty, Devo, Elvis Costello & The Attractions, The Stray Cats, Rick Springfield, Kiss (2/19/84), Culture Club, Ratt, The Pointer Sisters, Cyndi Lauper, Billy Idol, Billy Ocean, Richard Marx, Queensrÿche), trade shows, and sporting events such as the 1993 and 1994 Mid-American Conference men's basketball tournaments. The exhibit hall was also the home of professional wrestling cards from the early 1980s to mid-1990s with monthly visits from the WWE and the occasional WCW event. The hall totals 90,000 square feet (8,400 m^{2}) of exhibit space - 65,000 on the main floor and 25,000 on the balcony, and can be divisible into two halls.

The first entertainment event at the facility was comedian Rodney Dangerfield and special guest McGuffey Lane on September 20, 1980 attended by 6,677 persons.

In 1996, the Franklin County Convention Facilities Authority took ownership of the Ohio Center (including Battelle Hall) and made it part of the Greater Columbus Convention Center.

Battelle Hall was also home to the Columbus Quest from 1996-1998, where the team won both championships in the now-defunct American Basketball League. Former players include Katie Smith, Sonja Tate, Tonya Edwards, Andrea Lloyd, Valerie Still, Shannon Johnson, and Nikki McCray.

Battelle Hall was renovated and reopened as Battelle Grand in 2010.

== Seating ==
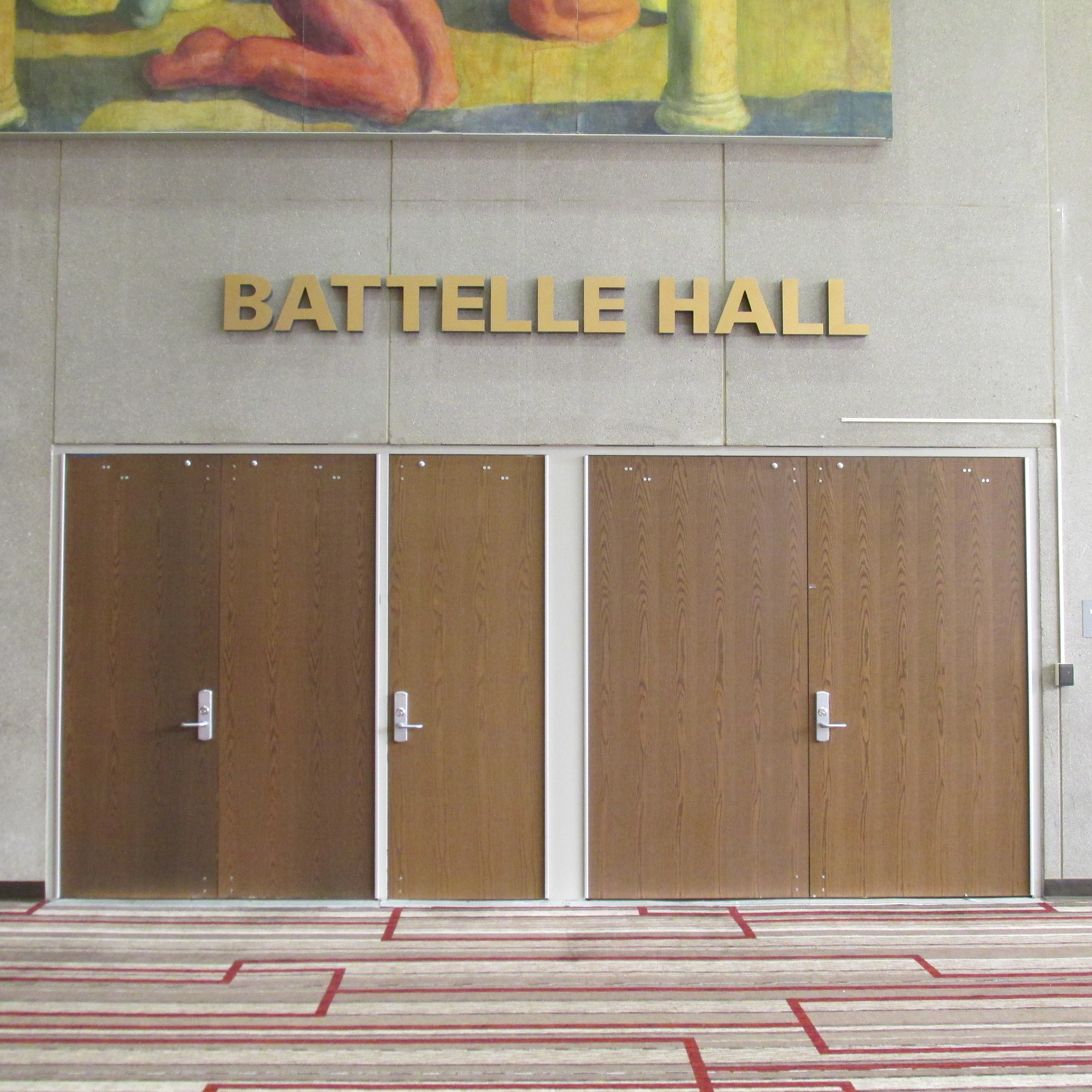
Entrance

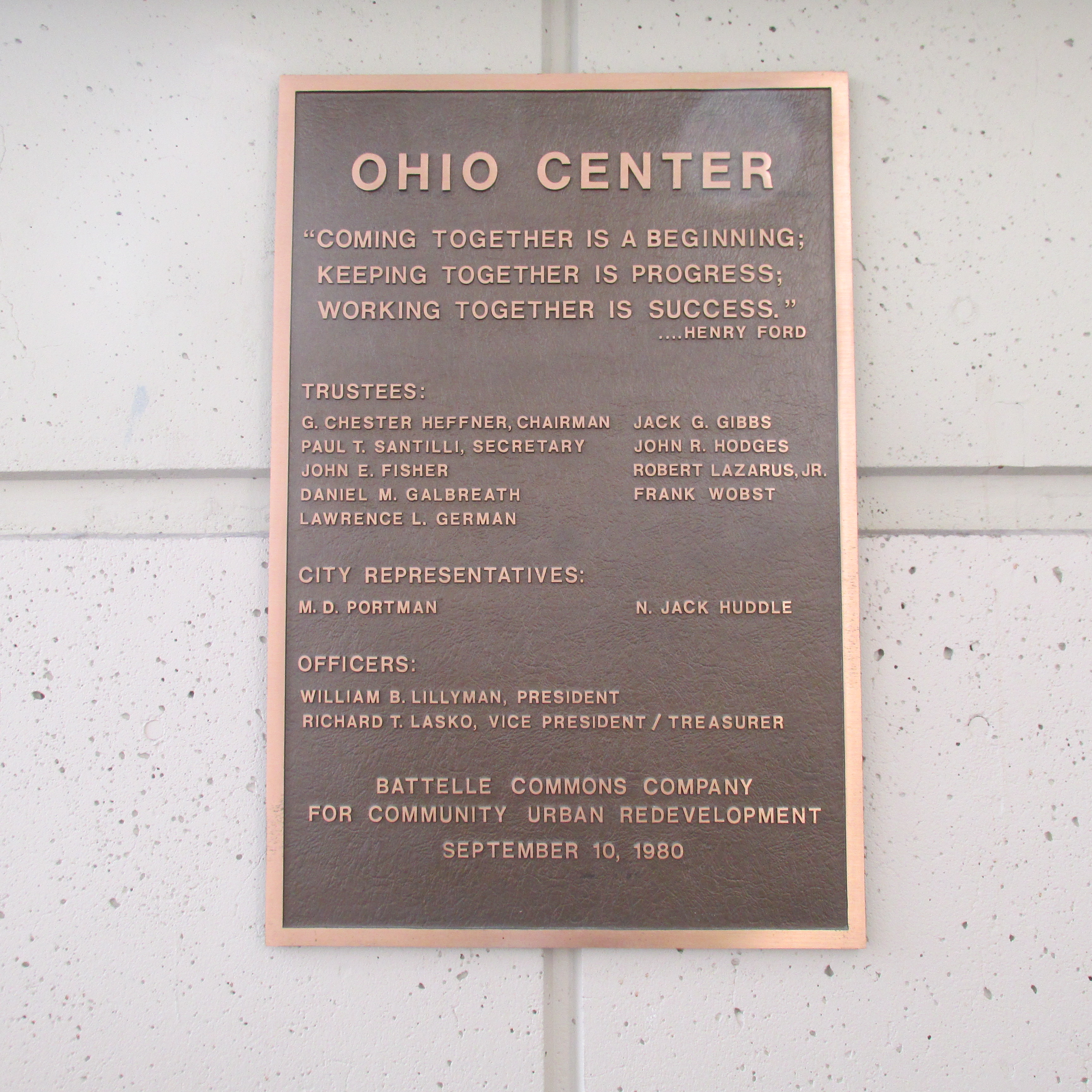
Plaque from the building's opening

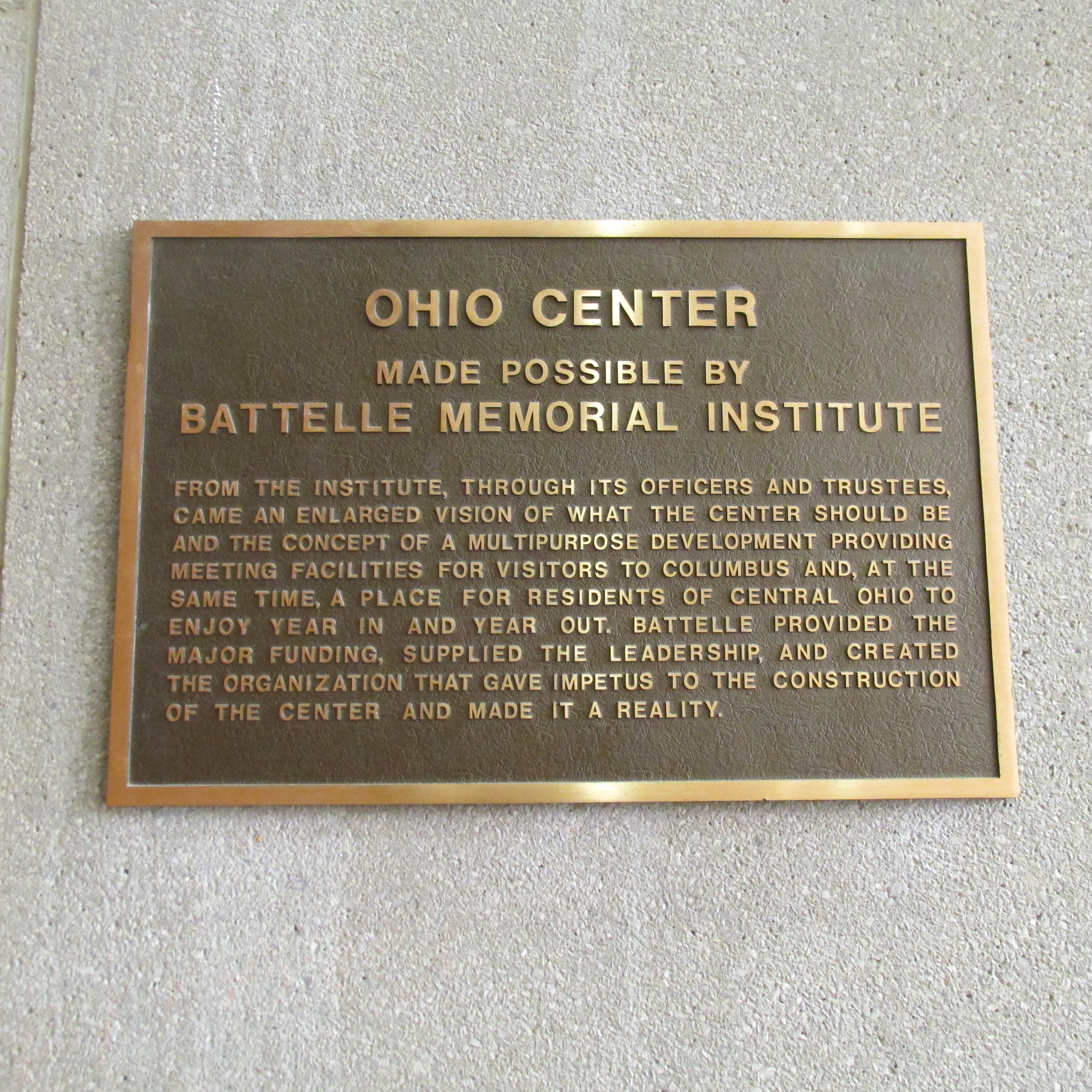
Plaque from the building's opening

Unlike arenas, Battelle Hall has no permanent seats. Instead, inexpensive plastic seats attached to metal bleachers are positioned into place for scheduled events.

Seating capacities:

- Bleacher seats:
  - Main floor - 3,116
  - Balcony - 3,679
- Soccer set - 5,074
- Concert set (with obstructed seats) - 7,588
- Concert set (without obstructed seats) - 6,400
- Concert in the round - 7,918
- Basketball - 6,500
- Ice Show (Ice Capades) - 5,464
- North Hall set - 3,801
- South Hall set - 2,494

Other Dimensions:

- With risers set for concerts - 65 ft × 180 ft (20 m × 55 m)
- Full hall beginning at columns - 141 ft × 240 ft (43 m × 73 m)/33,840 sq ft (3,144 m^{2})
- Battelle Hall North - 141 ft × 145 ft (43 m × 44 m)/20,445 sq ft (1,899.4 m^{2})
- Battelle Hall South - 95 ft × 141 ft (29 m × 43 m)/13,395 sq ft (1,244.4 m^{2})
- Balcony railing to Wall - 33 ft (10 m)
- From floor to underside balcony - 13 ft 6 in (4.11 m)
- Main floor to underside of hoisting grid - 33 ft (10 m)

The exhibit hall features a 32-by-60-foot (9.8 m × 18.3 m) portable stage.

== See also ==
- Greater Columbus Convention Center
- Columbus Capitals (indoor soccer)
- Columbus Horizon
- Columbus Invaders
- Columbus Quest
