= TCU Horned Frogs men's basketball statistical leaders =

The TCU Horned Frogs men's basketball statistical leaders are individual statistical leaders of the TCU Horned Frogs men's basketball program in various categories, including points, assists, blocks, rebounds, and steals. Within those areas, the lists identify single-game, single-season, and career leaders. The Horned Frogs represent Texas Christian University in the NCAA's Big 12 Conference.

TCU began competing in intercollegiate basketball in 1908. However, the school's record book does not generally list records from before the 1950s, as records from before this period are often incomplete and inconsistent. Since scoring was much lower in this era, and teams played much fewer games during a typical season, it is likely that few or no players from this era would appear on these lists anyway.

The NCAA did not officially record assists as a stat until the 1983–84 season, and blocks and steals until the 1985–86 season, but TCU's record books includes players in these stats before these seasons. These lists are updated through the end of the 2020–21 season.

== Scoring ==
Career
Rk	Player	Points	Seasons
1	Darrell Browder	1,886	1979–80 1980–81 1981–82 1982–83
2	Corey Santee	1,832	2001–02 2002–03 2003–04 2004–05
3	Desmond Bane	1,784	2016–17 2017–18 2018–19 2019–20
4	Carven Holcombe	1,734	1983–84 1984–85 1985–86 1986–87
5	Dick O'Neal	1,723	1954–55 1955–56 1956–57
6	Reggie Smith	1,630	1988–89 1989–90 1990–91 1991–92
7	Kyan Anderson	1,624	2011–12 2012–13 2013–14 2014–15
8	Kurt Thomas	1,512	1990–91 1991–92 1993–94 1994–95
9	Ryan Carroll	1,508	1997–98 1998–99 1999–00 2000–01
10	Lee Nailon	1,503	1997–98 1998–99

Season
Rk	Player	Points	Season
1	Lee Nailon	796	1997–98
2	Kurt Thomas	781	1994–95
3	Lee Nailon	707	1998–99
4	Mike Jones	702	1997–98
5	Dick O'Neal	676	1954–55
6	Marquise Gainous	662	1999–00
7	Malcolm Johnson	656	1996–97
8	Mike Jones	621	1996–97
9	Malcolm Johnson	616	1997–98
	Damion Walker	616	1995–96

Single game
Rk	Player	Points	Season	Opponent
1	Lee Nailon	53	1997–98	Mississippi Valley State
2	Mike Jones	51	1997–98	Delaware State
3	Dick O'Neal	49	1954–55	Rice
4	Lee Nailon	46	1997–98	Hawai'i
5	Mike Jones	45	1997–98	UT Pan American
	Kurt Thomas	45	1994–95	Illinois-Chicago
	Dick O'Neal	45	1954–55	Austin College

== Rebounds ==
Career
Rk	Player	Rebounds	Seasons
1	Reggie Smith	966	1988–89 1989–90 1990–91 1991–92
2	Ronny Stevenson	917	1956–57 1957–58 1958–59
3	Gary Turner	887	1963–64 1964–65 1965–66
4	Kenrich Williams	877	2014–15 2016–17 2017–18
5	James Cash	856	1966–67 1967–68 1968–69
6	Mickey McCarty	795	1965–66 1966–67 1967–68
7	Dick O'Neal	790	1954–55 1955–56 1956–57
8	H. E. Kirchner	783	1956–57 1957–58 1958–59
9	Kurt Thomas	782	1990–91 1991–92 1993–94 1994–95
10	Dennis Davis	762	1994–95 1995–96 1996–97 1997–98

Season
Rk	Player	Rebounds	Season
1	Eugene Kennedy	432	1970–71
2	Kurt Thomas	393	1994–95
3	Reggie Smith	386	1991–92
4	Doug Boyd	365	1969–70
5	Kenrich Williams	359	2016–17
6	H. E. Kirchner	348	1958–59
7	Dennis Davis	323	1997–98
8	Doug Arnold	317	1982–83
	Ronny Stevenson	317	1957–58
10	Ronny Stevenson	311	1956–57

Single game
Rk	Player	Rebounds	Season	Opponent
1	Eugene Kennedy	28	1970–71	Arkansas
2	Doug Boyd	27	1969–70	Baylor
	Ronny Stevenson	27	1957–58	McMurry
4	Jamal Brown	26	2001–02	North Texas
	James Cash	26	1968–69	Oklahoma City
	Dick O'Neal	26	1954–55	Abilene Christian

== Assists ==
Career
Rk	Player	Assists	Seasons
1	Alex Robinson	672	2016–17 2017–18 2018–19
2	Corey Santee	575	2001–02 2002–03 2003–04 2004–05
3	Prince Fowler	514	1996–97 1997–98 1998–99
4	Kyan Anderson	480	2011–12 2012–13 2013–14 2014–15
5	Jeff Jacobs	475	1993–94 1994–95 1995–96 1996–97
6	Darrell Browder	459	1979–80 1980–81 1981–82 1982–83
7	Tony Edmond	414	1988–89 1989–90
8	Hank Thorns	377	2010–11 2011–12
9	Jamie Dixon	353	1983–84 1984–85 1985–86 1986–87
10	Thomas McTyer	339	1997–98 1998–99 1999–00 2000–01
	Mike Jones	339	1996–97 1997–98

Season
Rk	Player	Assists	Season
1	Alex Robinson	254	2018–19
2	Tony Edmond	234	1989–90
3	Alex Robinson	228	2016–17
4	Prince Fowler	226	1998–99
5	Hank Thorns	225	2010–11
6	Prince Fowler	200	1997–98
7	Brock Harding	195	2025–26
8	Alex Robinson	190	2017–18
9	Ronnie Moss	189	2009–10
10	Mike Jones	181	1997–98

Single game
Rk	Player	Assists	Season	Opponent
1	Alex Robinson	17	2017–18	Iowa State
2	Greedy Daniels	16	2000–01	Central Oklahoma
	Prince Fowler	16	1998–99	Wyoming
	Prince Fowler	16	1998–99	Central Oklahoma
5	Prince Fowler	15	1998–99	Texas Tech
	Tony Edmond	15	1989–90	Houston

== Steals ==
Career
Rk	Player	Steals	Seasons
1	Kyan Anderson	168	2011–12 2012–13 2013–14 2014–15
2	Mike Jones	163	1996–97 1997–98
3	Corey Santee	155	2001–02 2002–03 2003–04 2004–05
4	Alex Robinson	147	2016–17 2017–18 2018–19
5	Kenrich Williams	141	2014–15 2016–17 2017–18
6	Malcolm Johnson	137	1996–97 1997–98
7	Ryan Carroll	133	1997–98 1998–99 1999–00 2000–01
8	Desmond Bane	132	2016–17 2017–18 2018–19 2019–20
9	Darrell Browder	129	1979–80 1980–81 1981–82 1982–83
10	Brent Hackett	125	2004–05 2005–06 2006–07 2007–08

Season
Rk	Player	Steals	Season
1	Greedy Daniels	108	2000–01
2	Mike Jones	96	1997–98
3	Jameer Nelson Jr.	70	2023–24
4	Malcolm Johnson	69	1997–98
5	Malcolm Johnson	68	1996–97
6	Mike Jones	67	1996–97
7	Tony Edmond	63	1989–90
	Malique Trent	63	2015–16
9	Junior Blount	61	2001–02
	Brock Harding	61	2025–26

Single game
Rk	Player	Steals	Season	Opponent
1	Greedy Daniels	12	2000–01	Arkansas-Pine Bluff
2	Greedy Daniels	8	2000–01	Grambling State

== Blocks ==
Career
Rk	Player	Blocks	Seasons
1	Kevin Samuel	206	2018–19 2019–20 2020–21
2	Vladimir Brodziansky	171	2015–16 2016–17 2017–18
	James Penny	171	1994–95 1995–96 1996–97 1997–98
4	Derrick Davenport	170	1999–00 2000–01
5	Kurt Thomas	166	1990–91 1991–92 1993–94 1994–95
6	Reggie Smith	133	1988–89 1989–90 1990–91 1991–92
7	Karviar Shepherd	103	2013–14 2014–15 2015–16 2016–17
8	David Punch	94	2024–25 2025–26
9	Craig Sibley	85	1988–89 1989–90
10	Dennis Davis	81	1994–95 1995–96 1996–97 1997–98

Season
Rk	Player	Blocks	Season
1	Derrick Davenport	96	1999–00
2	Kevin Samuel	85	2019–20
3	Vladimir Brodziansky	82	2016–17
4	Kevin Samuel	77	2018–19
5	Derrick Davenport	74	2000–01
6	Kurt Thomas	69	1993–94
7	Kurt Thomas	66	1994–95
	David Punch	66	2025–26
9	James Penny	63	1996–97
	James Penny	63	1995–96

Single game
Rk	Player	Blocks	Season	Opponent
1	Derrick Davenport	12	1999–00	Alaska-Fairbanks
	Kurt Thomas	12	1994–95	Texas A&M
3	Derrick Davenport	11	1999–00	Rice
4	Derrick Davenport	9	2000–01	Texas Tech
	Kurt Thomas	9	1993–94	Louisiana Tech
