= 1997–98 Kansas Jayhawks men's basketball team =

American college basketball season

1997–98 Kansas Jayhawks men's basketball

Preseason NIT champions Big 12 Regular Season champions Big 12 Tournament champions

NCAA men's Division I tournament, Round of 32
- Conference: Big 12 Conference
- North

Ranking
- Coaches: No. 8
- AP: No. 2
- Record: 35–4 (15–1 Big 12)
- Head coach: Roy Williams (10th season)
- Assistant coaches: Matt Doherty (5th season); Neil Dougherty (3rd season); Joe Holladay (4th season)
- Captains: Raef LaFrentz; C.B. McGrath; Billy Thomas
- Home arena: Allen Fieldhouse

1997–98 Big 12 men's basketball standings
| | Conf. | | | | Overall |
| Team | W | | L | PCT | W | | L | PCT |
|---|---|---|---|---|---|---|---|---|
| No. 2 Kansas † | 15 | – | 1 | .938 | 35 | – | 4 | .897 |
| Oklahoma State | 11 | – | 5 | .688 | 22 | – | 7 | .759 |
| Oklahoma | 11 | – | 5 | .688 | 22 | – | 11 | .667 |
| Nebraska | 10 | – | 6 | .625 | 20 | – | 12 | .625 |
| Baylor | 8 | – | 8 | .500 | 14 | – | 14 | .500 |
| Missouri | 8 | – | 8 | .500 | 17 | – | 15 | .531 |
| Texas Tech | 7 | – | 9 | .438 | 13 | – | 14 | .481 |
| Kansas State | 7 | – | 9 | .438 | 17 | – | 12 | .586 |
| Colorado | 7 | – | 9 | .438 | 13 | – | 14 | .481 |
| Texas | 6 | – | 10 | .375 | 14 | – | 17 | .452 |
| Iowa State | 5 | – | 11 | .313 | 12 | – | 18 | .400 |
| Texas A&M | 1 | – | 15 | .063 | 7 | – | 20 | .259 |
† 1998 Big 12 Tournament winner Rankings from AP poll

The 1997–98 Kansas Jayhawks men's basketball team represented the University of Kansas in the 1997–98 NCAA Division I men's basketball season, which was the Jayhawks' 100th basketball season. The head coach was Roy Williams, who served his 10th year at KU. The team played its home games in Allen Fieldhouse in Lawrence, Kansas. They are known for having the distinction of playing an unprecedented 34 regular season games.

== Roster ==
| Name | # | Position | Height | Weight | Year | Home Town |
|---|---|---|---|---|---|---|
| Nick Bradford | 21 | Forward | 6-6 | 175 | Sophomore | Fayetteville, Arkansas |
| Jeff Carey | 22 | Forward/Center | 6–10 | 230 | Freshman (RS) | Camdenton, Missouri |
| Eric Chenowith | 44 | Center | 7–0 | 235 | Freshman | Orange, California |
| Lester Earl | 3 | Forward/Center | 6-8 | 235 | Sophomore | Baton Rouge, Louisiana |
| Kenny Gregory | 20 | Guard | 6–5 | 215 | Freshman | Columbus, Ohio |
| Jelani Janisse | 23 | Guard | 6–3 | 200 | Junior | Los Angeles, California |
| Raef LaFrentz | 45 | Forward | 6–11 | 235 | Senior | Hampton, Iowa |
| Chris Martin | 30 | Guard | 6–2 | 190 | Junior | Overland Park, Kansas |
| C.B. McGrath | 24 | Guard | 5-11 | 173 | Senior | Topeka, Kansas |
| Terry Nooner | 5 | Guard | 6–0 | 170 | Sophomore | Raytown, Missouri |
| Paul Pierce | 34 | Forward | 6–7 | 220 | Junior | Inglewood, California |
| T.J. Pugh | 32 | Forward/Center | 6–8 | 246 | Junior | Omaha, Nebraska |
| Ryan Robertson | 4 | Guard | 6–5 | 182 | Junior | Saint Charles, Missouri |
| Billy Thomas | 12 | Guard | 6–4 | 208 | Senior | Shreveport, Louisiana |

== Big 12 Conference standings ==
| # | Team | Conference | Pct. | Overall | Pct. |
|---|---|---|---|---|---|
| 1 | Kansas | 15-1 | .938 | 35-4 | .897 |
| 2 | Oklahoma State | 11-5 | .688 | 22-7 | .759 |
| 3 | Oklahoma | 11-5 | .688 | 22-11 | .667 |
| 4 | Nebraska | 10-6 | .625 | 20-12 | .625 |
| 5 | Baylor | 8-8 | .500 | 14-14 | .500 |
| 6 | Missouri | 8-8 | .500 | 17-15 | .531 |
| 7 | Texas Tech | 7–9 | .438 | 13-14 | .481 |
| 8 | Kansas State | 7-9 | .438 | 17-12 | .586 |
| 9 | Colorado | 7-9 | .438 | 13-14 | .481 |
| 10 | Texas | 6-10 | .375 | 14-17 | .452 |
| 11 | Iowa State | 5-11 | .313 | 12-18 | .400 |
| 12 | Texas A&M | 1-15 | .063 | 7-20 | .529 |

== Schedule ==
| Date time, TV | Rank^{#} | Opponent^{#} | Result | Record | Site city, state |
Regular Season
| 11/14/1997* | No. 2 | Santa Clara | W 99-73 | 1–0 | Allen Fieldhouse; Lawrence, KS |
| 11/17/1997* | No. 2 | Rice | W 88-61 | 2–0 | Allen Fieldhouse; Lawrence, KS |
| 11/18/1997* | No. 2 | Western Kentucky; Preseason NIT first round | W 75-62 | 3–0 | Allen Fieldhouse; Lawrence, KS |
| 11/21/1997* | No. 2 | UNLV; Preseason NIT Second round | W 92-68 | 4–0 | Allen Fieldhouse; Lawrence, KS |
| 11/26/1997* | No. 2 | vs. Arizona State; Preseason NIT Semifinals | W 90-88 ^{OT} | 5-0 | Madison Square Garden; New York, NY |
| 11/28/1997* | No. 2 | vs. Florida State; Preseason NIT Championship Game | W 73-58 | 6-0 | Madison Square Garden; New York, NY |
| 12/02/1997* | No. 2 | vs. No. 4 Arizona; Great Eight | W 90-87 | 7-0 | United Center; Chicago, IL |
| 12/04/1997* | No. 2 | Emporia State | W 102-50 | 8-0 | Allen Fieldhouse; Lawnrence, KS |
| 12/07/1997* | No. 2 | vs. No. 23 Maryland; BB&T Classic Basketball Tournament first round | L 83-86 | 8-1 | Verizon Center; Washington, DC |
| 12/08/1997* | No. 2 | vs. Penn; BB&T Classic Basketball Tournament Third-place game | W 89-71 | 9-1 | Verizon Center; Washington, DC |
| 12/10/1997* | No. 3 | UMass | W 73-71 | 10-1 | Allen Fieldhouse; Lawrence, KS |
| 12/13/1997* | No. 3 | Middle Tennessee State | W 103-68 | 11-1 | Allen Fieldhouse; Lawrence, KS |
| 12/18/1997* | No. 2 | Pepperdine | W 96-83 | 12-1 | Allen Fieldhouse; Lawrence, KS |
| 12/20/1997* | No. 2 | vs. No. 24 TCU; Sprint Shootout | W 94-78 | 13-1 | Kemper Arena; Kansas City, MO |
| 12/23/1997* | No. 2 | at USC | W 74-69 | 14-1 | Los Angeles Memorial Sports Arena; Los Angeles, CA |
| 12/28/1997* | No. 2 | vs. Ohio State; Rainbow Classic First round | W 69-56 | 15-1 | Stan Sheriff Center; Honolulu, HI |
| 12/29/1997* | No. 2 | vs. Vanderbilt; Rainbow Classic Semifinals | W 89-82 | 16-1 | Stan Sheriff Center; Honolulu, HI |
| 12/30/1997* | No. 2 | vs. Hawaii; Rainbow Classic Championship Game | L 65-76 | 16-2 | Stan Sheriff Center; Honolulu, HI |
| 1/3/1998 | No. 2 | Nebraska | W 97-76 | 17-2 (1–0) | Allen Fieldhouse; Lawrence, KS |
| 1/7/1998 | No. 4 | Colorado | W 111-62 | 18-2 (2–0) | Allen Fieldhouse; Lawrence, KS |
| 1/10/1998 | No. 4 | at Texas | W 102-72 | 19-2 (3–0) | Frank Erwin Center; Austin, TX |
| 1/14/1998 | No. 3 | at Texas A&M | W 83-65 | 20-2 (4–0) | Reed Arena; College Station, TX |
| 1/17/1998 | No. 3 | Kansas State; Sunflower Showdown | W 69-62 | 21-2 (5–0) | Allen Fieldhouse; Lawrence, KS |
| 1/19/1998 | No. 3 | at Missouri; Border War | L 73-74 | 21-3 (5–1) | Hearnes Center; Columbia, MO |
| 1/24/1998 | No. 3 | Texas Tech | W 88-49 | 22-3 (6–1) | Allen Fieldhouse; Lawrence, KS |
| 1/28/1998 | No. 5 | Baylor | W 94-47 | 23-3 (7–1) | Allen Fieldhouse; Lawrence, KS |
| 2/1/1998 | No. 5 | at Nebraska | W 82-71 | 24-3 (8–1) | Bob Devaney Sports Center; Lincoln, NE |
| 2/4/1998 | No. 3 | at Iowa State | W 83-62 | 25-3 (9–1) | Hilton Coliseum; Ames, IA |
| 2/8/1998 | No. 3 | Missouri; Border War | W 80-70 | 26-3 (10–1) | Allen Fieldhouse; Lawrence, KS |
| 2/14/1998 | No. 4 | at Kansas State; Sunflower Showdown | W 73-58 | 27-3 (11–1) | Bramlage Coliseum; Manhattan, KS |
| 2/16/1998 | No. 4 | at Colorado | W 81-72 | 28-3 (12–1) | Coors Events Center; Boulder, CO |
| 2/21/1998 | No. 4 | Iowa State | W 71-54 | 29-3 (13–1) | Allen Fieldhouse; Lawrence, KS |
| 2/23/1998 | No. 4 | Oklahoma | W 83-70 | 30-3 (14–1) | Allen Fieldhouse; Lawrence, KS |
| 3/1/1998 | No. 4 | at No. 25 Oklahoma State | W 71-67 | 31-3 (15–1) | Gallagher-Iba Arena; Stillwater, OK |
Big 12 Tournament
| 3/6/1998 | (1) No. 3 | vs. (8) Kansas State; Quarterfinals | W 68–61 | 32–3 | Kemper Arena; Kansas City, MO |
| 3/7/1998 | (1) No. 3 | vs. (4) Nebraska; Semifinals | W 91–59 | 33–3 | Kemper Arena; Kansas City, MO |
| 3/8/1998 | (1) No. 3 | vs. (3) Oklahoma; Championship Game | W 72–58 | 34–3 | Kemper Arena; Kansas City, MO |
NCAA tournament
| 3/13/1998*; CBS | (1 MW) No. 2 | vs. (16 MW) Prairie View A&M; First round | W 110–52 | 35–3 | Myriad Convention Center; Oklahoma City, OK |
| 3/15/1998*; CBS | (1 MW) No. 2 | vs. (8 MW) Rhode Island; Second round | L 75–80 | 35–4 | Myriad Convention Center; Oklahoma City, OK |
*Non-conference game. ^{#}Rankings from AP Poll, NCAA tournament seeds shown in parentheses. (#) Tournament seedings in parentheses. All times are in Central Standard Time.

== Rankings ==
| Poll | Pre | Wk 1 | Wk 2 | Wk 3 | Wk 4 | Wk 5 | Wk 6 | Wk 7 | Wk 8 | Wk 9 | Wk 10 | Wk 11 | Wk 12 | Wk 13 | Wk 14 | Wk 15 | Wk 16 | Wk 17 |
|---|---|---|---|---|---|---|---|---|---|---|---|---|---|---|---|---|---|---|
| AP | 2 | 2 | 2 | 2 | 3 | 2 | 2 | 2 | 4 | 3 | 3 | 5 | 3 | 4 | 4 | 4 | 3 | 2 |
| Coaches | | | | | | | | | | | | | | | | | | |

*There was no coaches poll in week 1.
