= 1997–98 Butler Bulldogs men's basketball team =

American college basketball season

1997–98 Butler Bulldogs men's basketball
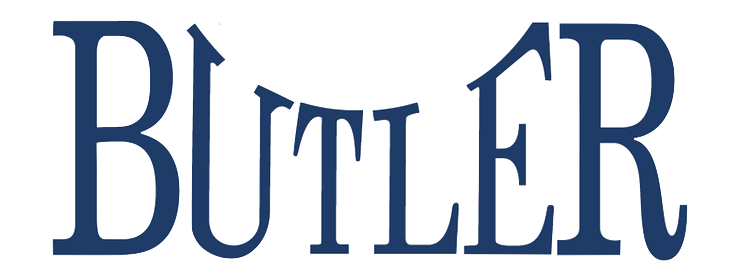

MCC tournament champions MCC regular season champions

NCAA tournament
- Conference: Midwestern Collegiate Conference
- Record: 22–11 (8–6 MCC)
- Head coach: Barry Collier (9th season)

1997–98 Midwestern Collegiate Conference men's basketball standings
	Conf.				Overall
Team	W		L	PCT	W		L	PCT
Detroit	12	–	2	.857	25	–	6	.806
UIC	12	–	2	.857	22	–	6	.786
Butler †	8	–	6	.571	22	–	11	.667
Green Bay	7	–	7	.500	17	–	12	.586
Cleveland State	6	–	8	.429	12	–	15	.444
Loyola Chicago	6	–	8	.429	15	–	15	.500
Wright State	3	–	11	.214	10	–	18	.357
Milwaukee	2	–	12	.143	3	–	24	.111
† 1998 MCC tournament winner

The 1997–98 Butler Bulldogs men's basketball team represented Butler University in the 1997–98 NCAA Division I men's basketball season. Their head coach was Barry Collier, serving in his 9th season at the school. The Bulldogs played their home games at Hinkle Fieldhouse as members of the Midwestern Collegiate Conference. Butler finished third in the MCC regular season standings and won the MCC tournament to receive the conference's automatic bid to the NCAA tournament – the school's second of three NCAA Tournament appearance in a four period under Collier. As No. 13 seed in the Southeast region, the Bulldogs were beaten by No. 4 seed New Mexico, 79–62 to finish the season with a record of 22–11 (8–6 MCC).

== Roster ==
1997–98 Butler Bulldogs men's basketball team
Players
Coaches

Pos.	#	Name	Height	Weight	Year	Hometown
G	11	Andrew Graves	6 ft 3 in (1.91 m)	—	So
F	22	Mike Marshall	6 ft 4 in (1.93 m)	—	So
F	33	Jon Neuhouser	6 ft 6 in (1.98 m)	220 lb (100 kg)	Sr	Leo-Cedarville, Indiana

Head coach

- Barry Collier (Butler)

Assistant coach(es)

Legend

- (C) Team captain
- (S) Suspended
- (I) Ineligible
- (W) Walk-on
- Injured
- Current redshirt

Roster

== Schedule and results ==
Date time, TV	Rank^{#}	Opponent^{#}	Result	Record	Site city, state
Regular season
Nov 19, 1997*		Indiana Wesleyan	W 87–44	1–0	Hinkle Fieldhouse (3,406); Indianapolis, Indiana
Nov 20, 1997*		Bradley	W 51–48	2–0	Hinkle Fieldhouse (3,132); Indianapolis, Indiana
Nov 22, 1997*		at Ball State	L 46–58	2–1	Worthen Arena (6,220); Muncie, Indiana
Nov 28, 1997*		vs. No. 18 Oklahoma	W 73–63	3–1	Afook-Chinen Civic Auditorium (2,250); Hilo, Hawaii
Nov 29, 1997*		vs. Pacific	W 73–67 ^{OT}	4–1	Afook-Chinen Civic Auditorium (1,500); Hilo, Hawaii
Nov 30, 1997*		vs. No. 15 Stanford	L 86–99	4–2	Afook-Chinen Civic Auditorium (1,500); Hilo, Hawaii
Dec 3, 1997*		at Western Kentucky	L 49–59	4–3	E.A. Diddle Arena (4,600); Bowling Green, Kentucky
Dec 6, 1997*		Indiana State	W 65–63	5–3	Hinkle Fieldhouse (5,791); Indianapolis, Indiana
Dec 10, 1997*		IUPUI	W 83–44	6–3	Hinkle Fieldhouse (3,225); Indianapolis, Indiana
Dec 13, 1997*		Evansville	W 63–46	7–3	Hinkle Fieldhouse (5,265); Indianapolis, Indiana
Dec 23, 1997*		James Madison	W 75–66	8–3	Hinkle Fieldhouse (3,773); Indianapolis, Indiana
Dec 27, 1997*		Belmont	W 85–54	9–3	Hinkle Fieldhouse (3,373); Indianapolis, Indiana
Dec 30, 1997*		at No. 13 Xavier	L 66–93	9–4	Cincinnati Gardens (10,100); Cincinnati, Ohio
Jan 3, 1998		Illinois-Chicago	W 78–76	10–4 (1–0)	Hinkle Fieldhouse (4,531); Indianapolis, Indiana
Jan 7, 1998		Loyola-Chicago	W 59–56 ^{OT}	11–4 (2–0)	Hinkle Fieldhouse (3,113); Indianapolis, Indiana
Jan 9, 1998*		at Southwest Missouri State	W 66–63	12–4	Hammons Student Center (6,551); Springfield, Missouri
Jan 12, 1998		Wright State	W 81–6	13–4 (3–0)	Hinkle Fieldhouse (3,211); Indianapolis, Indiana
Jan 15, 1998		at Cleveland State	L 62–67	13–5 (3–1)	Henry J. Goodman Arena (2,614); Cleveland, Ohio
Jan 17, 1998		at Detroit	L 67–78	13–6 (3–2)	Calihan Hall (4,076); Detroit, Michigan
Jan 22, 1998		Wisconsin-Green Bay	W 78–60	14–6 (4–2)	Hinkle Fieldhouse (5,153); Indianapolis, Indiana
Jan 24, 1998		UW-Milwaukee	W 74–66	15–6 (5–2)	Hinkle Fieldhouse (5,233); Indianapolis, Indiana
Jan 29, 1998		at Illinois-Chicago	L 62–72	15–7 (5–3)	UIC Pavilion (4,748); Chicago, Illinois
Jan 31, 1998		at Loyola-Chicago	L 62–70 ^{OT}	15–8 (5–4)	Joseph J. Gentile Arena (4,221); Chicago, Illinois
Feb 7, 1998		at Wright State	L 53–57	15–9 (5–5)	Ervin J. Nutter Center (5,949); Fairborn, Ohio
Feb 17, 1998		at UW-Milwaukee	W 71–56	16–9 (6–5)	Wisconsin Center Arena (557); Milwaukee, Wisconsin
Feb 12, 1998		Detroit	L 51–54	16–10 (6–6)	Hinkle Fieldhouse (4,213); Indianapolis, Indiana
Feb 14, 1998		Cleveland State	W 58–44	17–10 (7–6)	Hinkle Fieldhouse (6,632); Indianapolis, Indiana
Feb 19, 1998*		at Nevada	W 84–75	18–10	Lawlor Events Center (5,986); Reno, Nevada
Feb 21, 1998		at Wisconsin-Green Bay	W 59–57	19–10 (8–6)	Brown County Arena (4,017); Ashwaubenon, Wisconsin
MCC tournament
Feb 28, 1998*		vs. Loyola (IL); Quarterfinals	W 62–53	20–10	Brown County Arena (2,304); Ashwaubenon, Wisconsin
Mar 1, 1998*		vs. Wright State; Semifinals	W 67–48	21–10	Brown County Arena (5,112); Ashwaubenon, Wisconsin
Mar 3, 1998*		at Green Bay; Championship game	W 70–51	22–10	Brown County Arena (5,368); Ashwaubenon, Wisconsin
NCAA tournament
Mar 13, 1998*	(13 SE)	vs. (4 SE) No. 18 New Mexico; First round	L 62–79	22–11	Rupp Arena (15,622); Lexington, Kentucky
*Non-conference game. ^{#}Rankings from AP poll. (#) Tournament seedings in parentheses. SE=Southeast. All times are in Eastern Time.
