= 1997–98 Wright State Raiders men's basketball team =

American college basketball season

1997–98 Wright State Raiders men's basketball
- Conference: MCC
- Record: 10–18 (3–11 MCC)
- Head coach: Ed Schilling (1st season)
- Assistant coaches: Will Rey; Otis Hughley; Ken Barer
- Home arena: Nutter Center

1997–98 Midwestern Collegiate Conference men's basketball standings
	Conf.				Overall
Team	W		L	PCT	W		L	PCT
Detroit	12	–	2	.857	25	–	6	.806
UIC	12	–	2	.857	22	–	6	.786
Butler †	8	–	6	.571	22	–	11	.667
Green Bay	7	–	7	.500	17	–	12	.586
Cleveland State	6	–	8	.429	12	–	15	.444
Loyola Chicago	6	–	8	.429	15	–	15	.500
Wright State	3	–	11	.214	10	–	18	.357
Milwaukee	2	–	12	.143	3	–	24	.111
† 1998 MCC tournament winner

The 1997–98 Wright State Raiders men's basketball team represented Wright State University in the 1997–98 NCAA Division I men's basketball season led by head coach Ed Schilling.

== Season summary ==
The 1997–98 season was full of change, with WSU President Dr. Harley Flack introducing the university to a new coach, a revamped roster, and an unfamiliar mascot, the now-retired Brown Wolf.

=== Ed Schilling ===
Ed Schilling was brought to the Raiders from the New Jersey Nets in an effort to fulfill the administrative goals stated by President Flack and athletic director Mike Cusack: to make the Raiders a "top 50 program" with "top 40" attendance.

Schilling promised to work his players "harder than they've ever been worked," demanding strict discipline. With a roster inherited by Ralph Underhill and Jim Brown, his recruitment process favored perceived talent, with Schilling stating he would give all players a fair chance. With only two combined years of experience as a college and NBA assistant coach, he assumed responsibility for a team with a high-expectation administration.

=== Roster changes ===
==== Joining ====
Incoming freshman recruits were forward Onome Scott-Emuakpor from East Lansing, guard Brandon Pardon from Van Wert Lincolnview, and Center Bruno Petersons of Wheaton Academy in Illinois.

- Tony Baultrippe, a point guard out of Ellet High School in Akron, joined the Raiders from Iowa Western Junior College.
- Forward Sherman Curry from J.F. Shields High School in McWilliams, Alabama transferred in from Wallace State Community College.
- Marvin Rodgers, a 6' 9" forward, was a controversial late signing from Wallace Community College due to past legal trouble from his time at West Virginia.
- Inus Norville transferred in from University of Massachusetts to redshirt for his transfer year.

==== Leaving ====
- Rob Welch graduated following the 1996-97 season.
- John Sivesind (G) left the team on April 24, following a season where he started 27 games and was named to the Horizon league all-newcomer team, saying "I don't want it to be a job."
- De'Andre Shepard (F) left the team on April 24.
- Anthony Brown (F) left the team on April 24.
- Lequient Lewis (C) was dismissed by Coach Schilling on June 18 for missing classes and tutoring sessions.
- Mark Oliver (F) was placed on academic probation in September.
- Michael Richardson (G) quit the team on November 8 to transfer to Georetown College in Kentucky.
- Marvin Rodgers (F) was dismissed February 3 for missing classes. He had previously missed 5 games from three separate disciplinary issues.
- Tony Baultrippe (G) was dismissed February 13 for missing class, although it was also announced that he was charged with criminal damaging resulting from a disturbance at Wallaby's Sports Bar.

=== Final result ===
An eight game losing streak lowered the likelihood of a rebound season, while suspensions and dismissals were evidence of unrest within the team. A 3-2 stretch run to finish league play, including an upset to an ascendant top-league Butler, was followed by an upset of #2 seed UIC in the MCC tournament. A loss to the eventual champion, Butler, ended the 1997-1998 season

== Roster ==
1997–98 Wright State Raiders men's basketball team
Players
Coaches

Pos.	#	Name	Height	Weight	Year	Previous school	Hometown
F	43	Thad Burton	6 ft 8 in (2.03 m)	240 lb (109 kg)	Sr	St. Charles Prep	Columbus, OH
F	44	Steno Kos	6 ft 10 in (2.08 m)	220 lb (100 kg)	Sr	St. Catherine JC	Klosterneuburg
G	5	Tony Baultrippe	6 ft 3 in (1.91 m)	175 lb (79 kg)	Jr	Iowa Western CC	Akron, OH
G	21	Keion Brooks	6 ft 3 in (1.91 m)	160 lb (73 kg)	Jr	North Side	Ft. Wayne, IN
F	50	Inus Norville (redshirt)	6 ft 9 in (2.06 m)	230 lb (104 kg)	Jr	Hargrave Military	Rocky Mount, NC
F	30	Sherman Curry	6 ft 5 in (1.96 m)	190 lb (86 kg)	Jr	Wallace CC	McWilliams, AL
G	22	Michael Richardson	5 ft 10 in (1.78 m)	165 lb (75 kg)	So	Scott County	Georgetown, KY
G	25	Steve Yeagle	6 ft 4 in (1.93 m)	175 lb (79 kg)	So	Minford	Minford, OH
F	40	Marvin Rodgers	6 ft 9 in (2.06 m)	230 lb (104 kg)	So	Wallace CC	Portsmouth, VA
F	3	Onome Scott-Emuakpor	6 ft 7 in (2.01 m)	180 lb (82 kg)	Fr	East Lansing	East Lansing, MI
G	32	Brandon Pardon	6 ft 1 in (1.85 m)	170 lb (77 kg)	Fr	Lincolnview	Van Wert, OH
F	45	Ryan Grose	6 ft 7 in (2.01 m)	210 lb (95 kg)	RS Fr	Norwalk	Norwalk, OH
C	52	Bruno Petersons	7 ft 0 in (2.13 m)	220 lb (100 kg)	Fr	Wheaton Academy	West Chicago, IL

Head coach

- Ed Schilling

Assistant coach(es)

Will Rey, Otis Hughley, Ken Barer

Legend

- (C) Team captain
- (S) Suspended
- (I) Ineligible
- (W) Walk-on
- Injured
- Current redshirt

== Schedule and results ==
Date time, TV	Rank^{#}	Opponent^{#}	Result	Record	Site city, state
Nov 15, 1997*		at Central Michigan	W 82-72	1–0	Rose Arena; Mount Pleasant, MI
Nov 18, 1997*		Old Dominion	W 64-52	2–0	Nutter Center; Fairborn, OH
Nov 22, 1997*		Wilmington	W 84-55	3–0	Nutter Center; Fairborn, OH
Nov 25, 1997*		Ball State	W 62-60	3–1	Nutter Center; Fairborn, OH
Nov 29, 1997*		at Ohio	L 56-57	3–2	Nutter Center; Fairborn, OH
Dec 6, 1997*		at Cincinnati	L 60-85	3–3	Myrl Shoemaker Center; Cincinnati, OH
Dec 10, 1997*		at Bowling Green	W 76-67	4–3	Anderson Arena; Bowling Green, OH
Dec 13, 1997*		at Dayton; Gem City Jam	L 63-94	4-4	UD Arena; Dayton, OH
Dec 17, 1997*		at Michigan State	L 52-95	4-5	Breslin Center; East Lansing, MI
Dec 20, 1997		Central Michigan	W 79-72	5–5	Nutter Center; Fairborn, OH
Dec 22, 1997		Western Michigan	L 74-88	5–6	University Arena; Kalamazoo, MI
Dec 27, 1997*		Prairie View A&M	W 69–65	6–6	Nutter Center; Fairborn, OH
Jan 3, 1998		Loyola	W 69-65	7-6 (1–0)	Nutter Center; Fairborn, OH
Jan 5, 1998		UIC	L 81-83	7-7 (1–1)	Nutter Center; Fairborn, OH
Jan 12, 1998		at Butler	L 66-81	7-8 (1–2)	Hinkle Fieldhouse; Indianapolis
Jan 15, 1998		at Detroit Mercy	L 75–80	7-9 (1–3)	Calihan Hall; Detroit, MI
Jan 17, 1998		at Cleveland State	L 67-85	7-10 (1–4)	CSU Convocation Center; Cleveland, OH
Jan 22, 1998		Milwaukee	L 62-69	7-11 (1–5)	Nutter Center; Fairborn, OH
Jan 24, 1998		Green Bay	L 65-77	7-12 (1–6)	Nutter Center; Fairborn, OH
Jan 29, 1998		at Loyola	L 52-59	7-13 (1–7)	Gentile Event Center; Chicago, IL
Jan 31, 1998		at UIC	L 70-82	7-14 (1–8)	UIC Pavilion; Chicago, IL
Feb 7, 1998		Butler	W 57-53	8–14 (2–8)	Nutter Center; Fairborn, OH
Feb 12, 1998		Cleveland State	L 67-71	8-15 (2–9)	Nutter Center; Fairborn, OH
Feb 14, 1998		Detroit Mercy	W 60–58	8-16 (2–10)	Nutter Center; Fairborn, OH
Feb 19, 1998		at Green Bay	L 62-74	8-17 (2–11)	Brown County Veterans Memorial Arena; Green Bay, WI
Feb 21, 1998		at Milwaukee	W 75-65	9-17 (3–11)	MECCA Arena; Milwaukee, WI
Midwestern Collegiate Tournament
Feb 28, 1998	(7)	vs. (2) UIC; Quarterfinals	W 74-73	10-17	Brown County Veterans Memorial Arena; Green Bay, WI
Mar 1, 1998	(7)	vs. (3) Butler; Semifinals	L 48-67	10-18	Brown County Veterans Memorial Arena; Green Bay, WI
*Non-conference game. ^{#}Rankings from AP Poll. (#) Tournament seedings in parentheses. MW=Midwest.

== Awards and honors ==
Steno Kos	Raider Award
Thad Burton	Horizon League All Tournament Team

== Statistics ==
Number	Name	Games	Average	Points	Assists	Rebounds
21	Keion Brooks	28	17.1	479	76	129
43	Thad Burton	28	12.5	351	22	305
30	Sherman Curry	25	8.2	204	27	93
40	Marvin Rodgers	15	12.3	197	9	85
32	Brandon Pardon	28	6.1	172	111	49
5	Tony Baultrippe	17	8.5	144	31	32
44	Steno Kos	26	5.4	141	20	103
25	Steve Yeagle	27	2.3	63	11	31
21	Ryan Grose	21	2.9	60	8	37
3	Scott E. Onome	27	1.7	46	12	42
24	Bruno Petersons	24	0.8	19	3	20
33	Eddie Chambers	12	0.4	5	2	2
