= 1997–98 Oklahoma Sooners men's basketball team =

American college basketball season

1997–98 Oklahoma Sooners men's basketball

NCAA tournament, First round
- Conference: Big 12 Conference
- Record: 22–11 (11–5 Big 12)
- Head coach: Kelvin Sampson (4th season)
- Home arena: Lloyd Noble Center (Capacity: 10,871)

1997–98 Big 12 men's basketball standings
	Conf.				Overall
Team	W		L	PCT	W		L	PCT
No. 2 Kansas †	15	–	1	.938	35	–	4	.897
Oklahoma State	11	–	5	.688	22	–	7	.759
Oklahoma	11	–	5	.688	22	–	11	.667
Nebraska	10	–	6	.625	20	–	12	.625
Baylor	8	–	8	.500	14	–	14	.500
Missouri	8	–	8	.500	17	–	15	.531
Texas Tech	7	–	9	.438	13	–	14	.481
Kansas State	7	–	9	.438	17	–	12	.586
Colorado	7	–	9	.438	13	–	14	.481
Texas	6	–	10	.375	14	–	17	.452
Iowa State	5	–	11	.313	12	–	18	.400
Texas A&M	1	–	15	.063	7	–	20	.259
† 1998 Big 12 Tournament winner Rankings from AP poll

The 1997–98 Oklahoma Sooners men's basketball team represented the University of Oklahoma in competitive college basketball during the 1997–98 NCAA Division I men's basketball season. The Oklahoma Sooners men's basketball team played its home games in the Lloyd Noble Center and was a member of the National Collegiate Athletic Association's Big 12 Conference.

The team posted a 22–11 overall record (11–5 Big 12). The Sooners received a bid to the 1998 NCAA tournament as No. 10 seed in the East region. The Sooners lost to No. 7 seed Stanford, 94–87 in OT, in the opening round.

== Roster ==
1997–98 Oklahoma Sooners men's basketball team
Players
Coaches

Pos.	#	Name	Height	Weight	Year	Hometown
G	21	Eduardo Nájera	6 ft 8 in (2.03 m)	235 lb (107 kg)	So
G	24	Ryan Humphrey	6 ft 8 in (2.03 m)	230 lb (104 kg)	Fr	Booker T. Washington	Tulsa, Oklahoma
G	31	Corey Brewer	6 ft 2 in (1.88 m)	185 lb (84 kg)	Sr	West Memphis, Arkansas
C	32	Evan Wiley	6 ft 11 in (2.11 m)	—	Sr

Head coach

- Kelvin Sampson

Assistant coach(es)

Legend

- (C) Team captain
- (S) Suspended
- (I) Ineligible
- (W) Walk-on
- Injured
- Current redshirt

Roster

== Schedule and results ==
Date time, TV	Rank^{#}	Opponent^{#}	Result	Record	Site (attendance) city, state
Non-conference regular season
November 15, 1997*	No. 20	Jackson State	W 75–62	1–0	Lloyd Noble Center; Norman, Oklahoma
November 18, 1997*	No. 19	UT Arlington	W 81–63	2–0	Lloyd Noble Center; Norman, Oklahoma
November 22, 1997*	No. 19	Southwest Texas State	W 81–68	3–0	Lloyd Noble Center; Norman, Oklahoma
November 28, 1997*	No. 18	vs. Butler	L 63–73	3–1	Afook-Chinen Civic Auditorium; Hilo, Hawaii
November 29, 1997*	No. 18	vs. Wisconsin	L 64–75	3–2	Afook-Chinen Civic Auditorium; Hilo, Hawaii
November 30, 1997*	No. 18	at Hawaii–Hilo	W 86–70	4–2	Afook-Chinen Civic Auditorium; Hilo, Hawaii
December 4, 1997*		Arkansas-Pine Bluff	W 82–51	5–2	Lloyd Noble Center; Norman, Oklahoma
December 6, 1997*		at Mississippi State	L 65–67 ^{OT}	5–3	Humphrey Coliseum; Starkville, Mississippi
December 13, 1997*		Memphis	L 78–80	5–4	Lloyd Noble Center; Norman, Oklahoma
December 20, 1997*		Florida Atlantic	W 91–65	6–4	Lloyd Noble Center; Norman, Oklahoma
December 22, 1997*		North Texas	W 95–72	7–4	Lloyd Noble Center; Norman, Oklahoma
December 27, 1997*		vs. Coppin State; All-College Basketball Classic	W 83–72	8–4	The Myriad; Oklahoma City, Oklahoma
December 28, 1997*		vs. Alabama; All-College Basketball Classic	W 79–61	9–4	The Myriad; Oklahoma City, Oklahoma
Big 12 Regular Season
January 3, 1998		at Colorado	W 69–68	10–4 (1–0)	Coors Events Center; Boulder, Colorado
January 7, 1998		Kansas State	W 71–64	11–4 (2–0)	Lloyd Noble Center; Norman, Oklahoma
January 10, 1998		at Texas A&M	W 76–66	12–4 (3–0)	Reed Arena; College Station, Texas
January 12, 1998		Texas	W 91–75	13–4 (4–0)	Lloyd Noble Center; Norman, Oklahoma
January 18, 1998		at Nebraska	L 43–53	13–5 (4–1)	Bob Devaney Sports Center; Lincoln, Nebraska
January 21, 1998		Iowa State	W 64–63	14–5 (5–1)	Lloyd Noble Center; Norman, Oklahoma
January 24, 1998		at Baylor	W 61–60	15–5 (6–1)	Ferrell Center; Waco, Texas
January 26, 1998		Oklahoma State; Bedlam Series	L 84–88	15–6 (6–2)	Lloyd Noble Center; Norman, Oklahoma
January 31, 1998		Texas A&M	W 80–71	16–6 (7–2)	Lloyd Noble Center; Norman, Oklahoma
February 4, 1998		Texas Tech	L 68–70	16–7 (7–3)	Lloyd Noble Center; Norman, Oklahoma
February 8, 1998		at Texas	W 81–74	17–7 (8–3)	Frank Erwin Center; Austin, Texas
February 14, 1998		at Oklahoma State; Bedlam Series	L 66–70	17–8 (8–4)	Gallagher-Iba Arena; Stillwater, Oklahoma
February 18, 1998		Baylor	W 75–63	18–8 (9–4)	Lloyd Noble Center; Norman, Oklahoma
February 21, 1998		Missouri	W 80–76	19–8 (10–4)	Lloyd Noble Center; Norman, Oklahoma
February 23, 1998		at No. 4 Kansas	L 70–83	19–9 (10–5)	Allen Fieldhouse; Lawrence, Kansas
February 28, 1998		at Texas Tech	W 89–56	20–9 (11–5)	Lubbock Municipal Coliseum; Lubbock, Texas
Big 12 Tournament
March 6, 1998*	(3)	vs. (6) Missouri; Quarterfinals	W 58–53	21–9	Kemper Arena; Kansas City, Missouri
March 7, 1998*	(3)	vs. (10) Texas; Semifinals	W 68–55	22–9	Kemper Arena; Kansas City, Missouri
March 8, 1998*	(3)	vs. (1) No. 3 Kansas; Championship game	L 58–72	22–10	Kemper Arena; Kansas City, Missouri
NCAA Tournament
March 12, 1998*	(10 E)	vs. (7 E) Indiana; First round	L 87–94 ^{OT}	22–11	MCI Center; Washington, D.C.
*Non-conference game. ^{#}Rankings from AP Poll. (#) Tournament seedings in parentheses. All times are in Central Time. (#) during NCAA Tournament is seed within region E=East.
