= 1997–98 UIC Flames men's basketball team =

American college basketball season

1997–98 UIC Flames men's basketball

MCC Regular season co-champions

NCAA tournament
- Conference: Midwestern Collegiate Conference
- Record: 22–6 (12–2 MCC)
- Head coach: Jimmy Collins
- Home arena: UIC Pavilion

1997–98 Midwestern Collegiate Conference men's basketball standings
	Conf.				Overall
Team	W		L	PCT	W		L	PCT
Detroit	12	–	2	.857	25	–	6	.806
UIC	12	–	2	.857	22	–	6	.786
Butler †	8	–	6	.571	22	–	11	.667
Green Bay	7	–	7	.500	17	–	12	.586
Cleveland State	6	–	8	.429	12	–	15	.444
Loyola Chicago	6	–	8	.429	15	–	15	.500
Wright State	3	–	11	.214	10	–	18	.357
Milwaukee	2	–	12	.143	3	–	24	.111
† 1998 MCC tournament winner

The 1997–98 UIC Flames men's basketball team represented the University of Illinois at Chicago during the 1997–98 NCAA Division I men's basketball season. The Flames, led by head coach Jimmy Collins, played their home games at the UIC Pavilion in Chicago, Illinois as members of the Midwestern Collegiate Conference. UIC finished as regular season co-champions by going 12–2 in MCC play. They were knocked out early in the MCC tournament, but received an at-large bid to the NCAA tournament – the first bid in program history. Playing as No. 9 seed in the East region, UIC was beaten by No. 8 seed UNC Charlotte, 77–62, in the opening round.

== Roster ==
1997–98 UIC Flames men's basketball team
Players	Coaches
Pos. / # / Name / Height / Weight / Year / Hometown; G / / Mark Miller / 6 ft 2 in (1.88 m) / — / Sr	Head coach: Jimmy Collins (New Mexico State); Assistant coach(es) Legend: (C) Team captain; (S) Suspended; (I) Ineligible; (W) Walk-on; Injured; Current redshirt; Roster

== Schedule and results ==
Date time, TV	Rank^{#}	Opponent^{#}	Result	Record	Site (attendance) city, state
Regular season
Nov 16, 1997*		at Louisiana Tech	W 73–68	1–0	Thomas Assembly Center; Ruston, Louisiana
Nov 18, 1997*		Alabama State	W 86–64	2–0	UIC Pavilion; Chicago, Illinois
Nov 21, 1997*; 8:00 p.m.		Michigan State	W 70–58	3–0	UIC Pavilion; Chicago, Illinois
Nov 24, 1997*		at Illinois	L 70–71	3–1	Assembly Hall (10,789); Champaign, Illinois
Nov 29, 1997*		Bowling Green	W 80–50	4–1	UIC Pavilion; Chicago, Illinois
Dec 2, 1997*		at Northern Illinois	W 79–73	5–1	Chick Evans Field House; DeKalb, Illinois
Dec 4, 1997*		vs. Western Illinois; Montana Tournament	W 78–60	6–1	Brick Breeden Fieldhouse; Bozeman, Montana
Dec 6, 1997*		at Montana State; Montana Tournament	W 80–70	7–1	Brick Breeden Fieldhouse; Bozeman, Montana
Dec 13, 1997*		Valparaiso	W 72–51	8–1	UIC Pavilion (3,466); Chicago, Illinois
Dec 16, 1997*		Illinois State	W 75–67	9–1	UIC Pavilion (5,640); Chicago, Illinois
Dec 20, 1997*		Louisiana Tech	W 72–58	10–1	UIC Pavilion; Chicago, Illinois
Dec 28, 1997*		Marquette	L 67–73	10–2	UIC Pavilion; Chicago, Illinois
Jan 3, 1998		at Butler	L 76–78	10–3 (0–1)	Hinkle Fieldhouse (4,531); Indianapolis, Indiana
Jan 5, 1998		at Wright State	W 83–81	11–3 (1–1)	Ervin J. Nutter Center; Fairborn, Ohio
Jan 9, 1998		Cleveland State	W 83–67	12–3 (2–1)	UIC Pavilion; Chicago, Illinois
Jan 11, 1998		Detroit	W 88–83	13–3 (3–1)	UIC Pavilion; Chicago, Illinois
Jan 15, 1998		at UW-Milwaukee	W 72–63	14–3 (4–1)	Wisconsin Center Arena; Milwaukee, Wisconsin
Jan 19, 1998		at Wisconsin-Green Bay	W 60–58	15–3 (5–1)	Brown County Arena; Ashwaubenon, Wisconsin
Jan 24, 1998		at Loyola (IL)	W 61–55	16–3 (6–1)	Joseph J. Gentile Arena; Chicago, Illinois
Jan 29, 1998		Butler	W 72–62	17–3 (7–1)	UIC Pavilion (4,748); Chicago, Illinois
Jan 31, 1998		Wright State	W 82–70	18–3 (8–1)	UIC Pavilion; Chicago, Illinois
Feb 7, 1998		at Detroit	L 58–76	18–4 (8–2)	Calihan Hall; Detroit, Michigan
Feb 12, 1998		Wisconsin-Green Bay	W 56–47	19–4 (9–2)	UIC Pavilion; Chicago, Illinois
Feb 14, 1998		UW-Milwaukee	W 92–68	20–4 (10–2)	UIC Pavilion; Chicago, Illinois
Feb 19, 1998		at Cleveland State	W 96–72	21–4 (11–2)	Henry J. Goodman Arena; Cleveland, Ohio
Feb 21, 1998		Loyola (IL)	W 74–58	22–4 (12–2)	UIC Pavilion; Chicago, Illinois
MCC tournament
Feb 28, 1998*		vs. Wright State; Quarterfinals	L 73–74	22–5	Brown County Arena; Green Bay, Wisconsin
NCAA tournament
Mar 12, 1998*	(9 E)	vs. (8 E) UNC Charlotte; First round	L 62–77	22–6	Hartford Civic Center; Hartford, Connecticut
*Non-conference game. ^{#}Rankings from AP Poll. (#) Tournament seedings in parentheses. E=East. All times are in Central Time Zone.
