= 1998 Big 12 men's basketball tournament =

- Classification: Division I
- Season: 1997–98
- Teams: 12
- Site: Kemper Arena; Kansas City, Missouri
- Champions: Kansas (2nd title)
- Winning coach: Roy Williams (2nd title)
- MVP: Paul Pierce (Kansas)
- Attendance: 89,200 (overall); 16,800 (championship)
- Top scorer: Paul Pierce (Kansas) (67 points)
- Television: ESPN

1997–98 Big 12 men's basketball standings
	Conf.				Overall
Team	W		L	PCT	W		L	PCT
No. 2 Kansas †	15	–	1	.938	35	–	4	.897
Oklahoma State	11	–	5	.688	22	–	7	.759
Oklahoma	11	–	5	.688	22	–	11	.667
Nebraska	10	–	6	.625	20	–	12	.625
Baylor	8	–	8	.500	14	–	14	.500
Missouri	8	–	8	.500	17	–	15	.531
Texas Tech	7	–	9	.438	13	–	14	.481
Kansas State	7	–	9	.438	17	–	12	.586
Colorado	7	–	9	.438	13	–	14	.481
Texas	6	–	10	.375	14	–	17	.452
Iowa State	5	–	11	.313	12	–	18	.400
Texas A&M	1	–	15	.063	7	–	20	.259
† 1998 Big 12 Tournament winner Rankings from AP poll

The 1998 Big 12 men's basketball tournament was the postseason men's basketball tournament for the Big 12 Conference. It was played from March 5 to 8, in Kansas City, Missouri at Kemper Arena. Number 1 seed Kansas defeated 3 seed Oklahoma 72–58 to win the championship and receive the conference’s automatic bid to the 1998 NCAA tournament.

== Seeding ==
The Tournament consisted of a 12 team single-elimination tournament with the top 4 seeds receiving a bye.

1998 Big 12 Men's Basketball Tournament seeds
Seed	School	Conf.	Over.	Tiebreaker
1	Kansas ‡#	15–1	35–4	
2	Oklahoma State #	11–5	22–7	2–0 vs. OU
3	Oklahoma #	11–5	22–11	0–2 vs. OSU
4	Nebraska #	10–6	20–12	
5	Baylor	8–8	14–14	1–0 vs. MU
6	Missouri	8–8	17–15	0–1 vs. BU
7	Texas Tech	7–9	13–14	1–0 vs. KSU
8	Kansas State	7–9	17–12	5–5 vs. division (CU, ISU, KU, MU, NU)
9	Colorado	7–9	13–14	3–7 vs. division (ISU, KU, KSU, MU, NU)
10	Texas	6–10	14–17	
11	Iowa State	5–11	12–18	
12	Texas A&M	1–15	7–20	
‡ – Big 12 Conference regular season champions, and tournament No. 1 seed. # – Received a single-bye in the conference tournament. Overall records include all games played in the Big 12 Conference tournament.

== Schedule ==
Session	Game	Time	Matchup	Television	Attendance
First Round – Thursday, March 5
1	1	12:00 PM	#8 Kansas State 75 vs #9 Colorado 61	Big 12	9,300
1	2	2:20 PM	#5 Baylor 66 vs #12 Texas A&M 63	Big 12	9,300
2	3	6:00 PM	#10 Texas 86 vs #7 Texas Tech 83	Big 12	13,800
2	4	8:20 PM	#6 Missouri 74 vs #11 Iowa State 55	Big 12	13,800
Quarterfinals – Friday, March 6
3	5	12:00 PM	#1 Kansas 68 vs #8 Kansas State 61	Big 12	16,800
3	6	2:20 PM	#4 Nebraska 65 vs #5 Baylor 46	Big 12	16,800
4	7	6:00 PM	#10 Texas 65 vs #2 Oklahoma State 64	Big 12	15,400
4	8	8:20 PM	#3 Oklahoma 58 vs #6 Missouri 53	Big 12	15,400
Semifinals – Saturday, March 7
5	9	1:00 PM	#1 Kansas 91 vs #4 Nebraska 59	Big 12	17,100
5	10	3:20 PM	#3 Oklahoma 68 vs #10 Texas 55	Big 12	17,100
Final – Sunday, March 8
6	11	2:00 PM	#1 Kansas 72 vs #3 Oklahoma 58	ESPN	16,800
Game times in CT. #-Rankings denote tournament seed

== Bracket ==
First round
8	Kansas State	75
9	Colorado	61
5	Baylor	66
12	Texas A&M	63
10	Texas	86
7	Texas Tech	83
6	Missouri	74
11	Iowa State	55

Second round
1	No. 3 Kansas	68
8	Kansas State	61
4	Nebraska	75
5	Baylor	46
10	Texas	65
2	No. 25 Oklahoma St.	62
3	Oklahoma	58
6	Missouri	53

Semifinals
1	No. 3 Kansas	91
4	Nebraska	59
3	Oklahoma	68
10	Texas	55

Finals
1	No. 3 Kansas	72
3	Oklahoma	58

== All-Tournament Team ==
Most Outstanding Player – Paul Pierce, Kansas

Player	Team	Position	Class
Paul Pierce	Kansas	Jr.	F
Raef LaFrentz	Kansas	Sr.	F
Corey Brewer	Oklahoma	Sr.	G
Evan Wiley	Oklahoma	Sr.	C
Tyronn Lue	Nebraska	Jr.	G

== See also ==
- 1998 Big 12 Conference women's basketball tournament
- 1998 NCAA Division I men's basketball tournament
- 1997–98 NCAA Division I men's basketball rankings
