= 1997–98 Iowa State Cyclones men's basketball team =

American college basketball season

1997–98 Iowa State Cyclones men's basketball
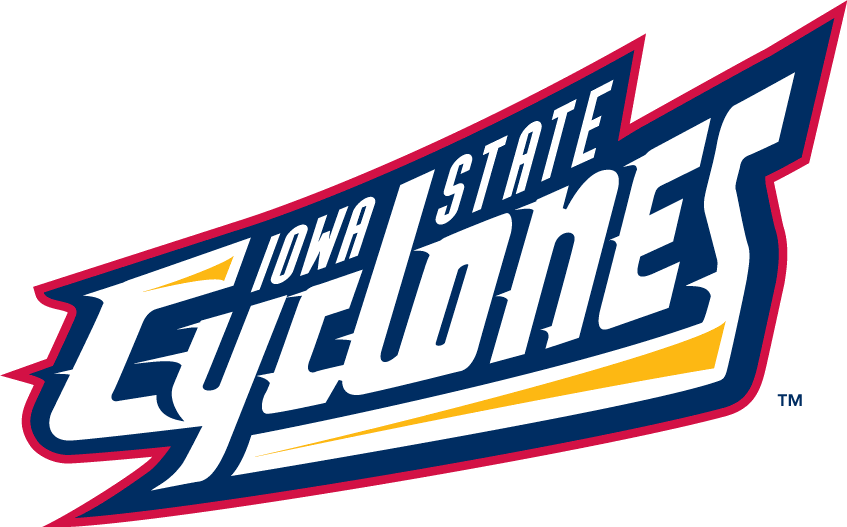
- Conference: Big 12 Conference
- Record: 12-18 (5-11 Big 12)
- Head coach: Tim Floyd (4th season)
- Assistant coaches: Sam Weaver; Gar Forman; Tom Bardal
- Home arena: Hilton Coliseum

1997–98 Big 12 men's basketball standings
	Conf.				Overall
Team	W		L	PCT	W		L	PCT
No. 2 Kansas †	15	–	1	.938	35	–	4	.897
Oklahoma State	11	–	5	.688	22	–	7	.759
Oklahoma	11	–	5	.688	22	–	11	.667
Nebraska	10	–	6	.625	20	–	12	.625
Baylor	8	–	8	.500	14	–	14	.500
Missouri	8	–	8	.500	17	–	15	.531
Texas Tech	7	–	9	.438	13	–	14	.481
Kansas State	7	–	9	.438	17	–	12	.586
Colorado	7	–	9	.438	13	–	14	.481
Texas	6	–	10	.375	14	–	17	.452
Iowa State	5	–	11	.313	12	–	18	.400
Texas A&M	1	–	15	.063	7	–	20	.259
† 1998 Big 12 Tournament winner Rankings from AP poll

The 1997–98 Iowa State Cyclones men's basketball team represented Iowa State University during the 1997–98 NCAA Division I men's basketball season. The Cyclones were coached by Tim Floyd, who was in his 4th season. They played their home games at Hilton Coliseum in Ames, Iowa, and competed in the Big 12 Conference.

They finished the season 12–18, 5–11 in Big 12 play to finish in 11th place. They lost to Missouri in the first round of the Big 12 Conference tournament.

At the conclusion of the season, head coach Tim Floyd accepted the same position with the Chicago Bulls of the NBA.

== Previous season ==
The previous season was the Cyclones' first year in the newly-formed Big 12 Conference. The Big 12 conference was formed by the eight teams of the recently dissolved Big Eight Conference, and was joined by Baylor, Texas, Texas A&M, and Texas Tech, all formerly of the Southwest Conference, which had dissolved following the 1995–1996 school year as well.

The Cyclones finished the season 22–9, 10–6 in Big 12 play to finish tied for third place. They defeated Texas Tech, and lost to Kansas in the semifinals of the Big 12 Conference tournament. They received an at-large bid to the NCAA tournament and a #6 seed. In the tournament, they defeated Illinois State and Cincinnati to reach the Sweet Sixteen, where they lost to UCLA.

The Cyclones saw individual success with Dedric Willoughby being named All-American Second Team, NCAA Tournament All-Regional Team, and first team All-Big Eight.

=== Offseason departures ===
Offseason departures
Name	Position	Reason for departure
Kelvin Cato	Center	Graduated/NBA draft
Jacy Holloway	Guard	Graduated
Dedric Willoughby	Guard	Graduated
Ha-Keem Abdel-Khaliq	Guard	Graduated
Kenny Pratt	Forward	Graduated
Shawn Bankhead	Forward	Graduated
Russ Schoenauer	Forward	Left basketball team
DeAndre Harris	Guard	Transferred out of program

== Preseason ==
Head Coach Tim Floyd signed McDonald's All-American Marcus Fizer. Fizer was the first, and to date, only McDonald's All-American to sign with Iowa State. Floyd first started recruiting Fizer when he was coaching at New Orleans.

Floyd also replenished the back-court with junior college transfers Jerry Curry, Tim Stevens, and Delvin Washington.

=== Preseason poll ===
Preseason poll
Finish	School
1	Kansas
2	Oklahoma
3	Texas
4	Missouri
5	Nebraska
6	Iowa State
7	Oklahoma State
8	Texas Tech
9	Colorado
10	Baylor
11	Texas A&M
12	Kansas State

=== Incoming players ===
Incoming players
Name	Position	Height	Weight	Previous school	Hometown
Marcus Fizer	Forward	6'8"	240 lbs.	Arcadia High	Arcadia, Louisiana
Lee Love	Guard	6'1"	170 lbs.	St. Augustine High	New Orleans
Lamont Sides	Guard	6'2"	160 lbs.	Marine Military Academy	High Point, North Carolina
Delvin Washington	Guard	6'2"	200 lbs.	Butler County CC	Port Arthur, Texas
Martin Rancik	Forward	6'8"	230 lbs.	Saint Louis Park	Nitra, SK
Paris Corner	Guard	6'1"	185 lbs.	West Brook High	Beaumont, Texas
Jerry Curry	Guard	6'1"	195 lbs.	Jacksonville CC	Jackson, Tennessee
Andy Strensrud	Guard	6'9"	245 lbs.	Lake Mills High	Lake Mills, Iowa
Chris Riddens	Forward	6'9"	210 lbs.	Mountain Grove High School	Mountain Grove, Missouri
Walter Moore	Forward	6'9"	230 lbs.	Parkway Central	Chesterfield, Missouri
Tim Stevens	Guard	6'0"	180 lbs.	Joliet JC	Minooka, Illinois

== Roster ==
1997–98 Iowa State Cyclones men's basketball team
Players
Coaches

Pos.	#	Name	Height	Weight	Year	Previous school	Hometown
G	3	Matt Knoll (C)	5 ft 11 in (1.8 m)	160 lb (73 kg)	Sr	East Marshall	Gilman, Iowa
G	4	Brad Johnson (C)	6 ft 5 in (1.96 m)	200 lb (91 kg)	Sr	Indian Hills CC	Geneseo, Illinois
F	5	Marcus Fizer	6 ft 8 in (2.03 m)	240 lb (109 kg)	Fr	Arcadia High	Arcadia, Louisiana
G	10	Lee Love	6 ft 1 in (1.85 m)	170 lb (77 kg)	Fr	St. Augustine High	New Orleans
G	11	Lamont Sides	6 ft 2 in (1.88 m)	160 lb (73 kg)	Fr	Marine Military Academy	High Point, North Carolina
G	12	Tim Stevens	6 ft 0 in (1.83 m)	180 lb (82 kg)	Jr	Joliet Junior College	Minooka, Illinois
G	13	Delvin Washington	6 ft 2 in (1.88 m)	200 lb (91 kg)	Jr	Butler County CC	Port Arthur, Texas
F	51	Martin Rancik	6 ft 8 in (2.03 m)	230 lb (104 kg)	Fr	Saint Louis Park	Nitra, SK
G	21	Paris Corner	6 ft 1 in (1.85 m)	185 lb (84 kg)	Fr	West Brook High	Beaumont, Texas
F	23	Stevie Johnson	6 ft 4 in (1.93 m)	225 lb (102 kg)	So	Perry Central	Beaumont, Mississippi
G	24	Jerry Curry	6 ft 1 in (1.85 m)	195 lb (88 kg)	Jr	Jacksonville CC	Jackson, Tennessee
F/C	31	Andy Strensrud	6 ft 9 in (2.06 m)	245 lb (111 kg)	Fr	Lake Mills High	Lake Mills, Iowa
G	33	Jason Teeter	6 ft 5 in (1.96 m)	180 lb (82 kg)	So	Algona High	Algona, Iowa
F	34	Chris Riddens (redshirt)	6 ft 9 in (2.06 m)	210 lb (95 kg)	RS Fr	Mountain Grove High School	Mountain Grove, Missouri
F	40	Klay Edwards	6 ft 9 in (2.06 m)	225 lb (102 kg)	RS Jr	Winfield-Mt. Union	Morning Sun, Iowa
F	45	Paul Shirley	6 ft 9 in (2.06 m)	230 lb (104 kg)	So	Jefferson West	Meriden, Kansas
F/C	50	Walter Moore (redshirt)	6 ft 9 in (2.06 m)	230 lb (104 kg)	RS Fr	Parkway Central	Chesterfield, Missouri
C	55	Tony Rampton	7 ft 0 in (2.13 m)	230 lb (104 kg)	Jr	Waseca High	New Plymouth, NZ

Head coach

- Tim Floyd (Louisiana Tech)

Assistant coach(es)

- Steve Krafcisin (Iowa)

Legend

- (C) Team captain
- (S) Suspended
- (I) Ineligible
- (W) Walk-on
- Injured
- Current redshirt

== Schedule and results ==
Date time, TV	Rank^{#}	Opponent^{#}	Result	Record	Site city, state
November 9, 1997*; 3:30 pm		Budućnost (Yugoslavia); Exhibition	W 85-70		Hilton Coliseum; Ames, Iowa
November 19, 1997*; 7:00 pm		World Basketball Opportunities; Exhibition	L 78-83		Hilton Coliseum; Ames, Iowa
Regular season
November 23, 1997*; 3:00 pm, CTN		Northern Iowa	L 48-54	0-1	Hilton Coliseum (10,132); Ames, Iowa
November 29, 1997*; 7:05 pm, CTN		Texas–Arlington	W 66-58	1-1	Hilton Coliseum (7.693); Ames, Iowa
December 2, 1997*; 7:00 pm, CTN		Arkansas–Pine Bluff	W 83-59	2-1	Hilton Coliseum (9,240); Ames, Iowa
December 5, 1997*; 8:00 pm, CTN		Texas Southern; Cyclone Challenge	W 83-60	3-1	Hilton Coliseum (7,850); Ames, Iowa
December 6, 1997*; 8:00 pm, CTN		Coppin State; Cyclone Challenge	W 77-74 ^{OT}	4-1	Hilton Coliseum (9,061); Ames, Iowa
December 10, 1997*; 7:05 pm, Drake		at Drake	L 61-63	4-2	Knapp Center (6,430); Des Moines, Iowa
December 13, 1997*; 4:00 pm, CTN		No. 10 Iowa	L 59-60	4-3	Hilton Coliseum (14,151); Ames, Iowa
December 20, 1997*; 8:05 pm, CTN		Alaska-Anchorage; ISU Holiday Challenge	W 57-55	5-3	Hilton Coliseum (9,041); Ames, Iowa
December 21, 1997*; 8:00 pm, CTN		Detroit Mercy; ISU Holiday Challenge	L 56-67	5-4	Hilton Coliseum (8,026); Ames, Iowa
December 24, 1997*; 4:00 pm CT, FSN		vs. No. 25 TCU; Puerto Rico Holiday Classic	L 54-93	5-5	Coliseo Rubén Rodríguez (500); Bayamón, Puerto Rico
December 25, 1997*; 2:00 pm CT		vs. Saint Louis; Puerto Rico Holiday Classic	W 62-57	6-5	Coliseo Rubén Rodríguez (500); Bayamón, Puerto Rico
December 26, 1997*; 2:00 pm CT		vs. Murray State; Puerto Rico Holiday Classic	L 76-84 ^{OT}	6-6	Coliseo Rubén Rodríguez (500); Bayamón, Puerto Rico
December 29, 1997*; 8:05 pm, CTN		at New Orleans	W 70-68	7-6	Lakefront Arena (5,029); New Orleans
January 3, 1998; 7:00 pm, CTN		at Texas Tech	L 55-66	7-7 (0-1)	Lubbock Municipal Coliseum (8,174); Lubbock, Texas
January 10, 1998; 3:00 pm, Big 12		Missouri	W 75-62	8-7 (1-1)	Hilton Coliseum (13,932); Ames, Iowa
January 14, 1998; 7:00 pm, CTN		at Kansas State	L 59-77	8-8 (1-2)	Bramlage Coliseum (8,100); Manhattan, Kansas
January 17, 1998; 7:00 pm, Big 12		Texas A&M	W 68-59	9-8 (2-2)	Hilton Coliseum (11,830); Ames, Iowa
January 21, 1998; 8:00 pm, Big 12		Oklahoma	L 63-64	9-9 (2-3)	Lloyd Noble Center (9,631); Norman, Oklahoma
January 24, 1999; 12:45 pm, Big 12		at Nebraska	L 49-63	9-10 (2-4)	Bob Devaney Center (10,565); Lincoln, Nebraska
January 27, 1998; 8:00 pm, Big 12		Texas	W 85-82	10-10 (3-4)	Hilton Coliseum (10,251); Ames, Iowa
January 31, 1998; 3:00 pm, Big 12		at Missouri	L 56-63	10-11 (3-5)	Hearnes Center (13,300); Columbia, Missouri
February 4, 1998; 8:00 pm, Big 12		No. 3 Kansas	L 62-83	10-12 (3-6)	Hilton Coliseum (14,044); Ames, Iowa
February 7, 1998; 3:00 pm, Big 12		at Colorado	L 52-70	10-13 (3-7)	Coors Events Center (5,633); Boulder, Colorado
February 9, 1998; 7:00 pm, ESPN2		Oklahoma State	L 66-81	10-14 (3-8)	Hilton Coliseum (10,210); Ames, Iowa
February 14, 1998; 12:45 pm, Big 12		Colorado	W 80-63	11-14 (4-8)	Hilton Coliseum (10,346); Ames, Iowa
February 18, 1998; 7:00 pm, CTN		Kansas State	W 63-62	12-14 (5-8)	Hilton Coliseum (12,203); Ames, Iowa
February 21, 1998; 3:00 pm, Big 12		at No. 4 Kansas	L 54-71	12-15 (5-9)	Allen Fieldhouse (16,300); Lawrence, Kansas
February 25, 1998; 7:00 pm, CTN		at Baylor	L 54-69	12-16 (5-10)	Ferrell Center (4,785); Waco, Texas
February 28, 1998; 7:00 pm, ESPN		Nebraska	L 62-70	12-17 (5-11)	Hilton Coliseum (13,465); Ames, Iowa
Big 12 Tournament
March 5, 1998; 8:30 pm, Big 12		vs. Missouri; First round	L 55-74	12-18 (5-11)	Kemper Arena (13,800); Kansas City, Missouri
*Non-conference game. ^{#}Rankings from AP poll. (#) Tournament seedings in parentheses. All times are in Central Time.

== Awards and honors ==
- All-Big 12 Selections

Marcus Fizer (Third team)

- Academic All-Big 12

Paul Shirley (First team)
Klay Edwards (Second team)

- Ralph A. Olsen Award

Marcus Fizer

- Big 12 Freshman of the Year

Marcus Fizer

- Big 12 Freshman of the Week

Marcus Fizer (January 4th)
Marcus Fizer (January 11th)
Marcus Fizer (February 23rd)
Marcus Fizer (March 1st)
