= 1997–98 Oklahoma State Cowboys basketball team =

American college basketball season

1997–98 Oklahoma State Cowboys basketball

NCAA tournament, second round
- Conference: Big 12 Conference
- Record: 22–7 (11–5 Big 12)
- Head coach: Eddie Sutton (8th season)
- Assistant coaches: Sean Sutton; Paul Graham
- Home arena: Gallagher-Iba Arena (Capacity: 6,381)

1997–98 Big 12 men's basketball standings
	Conf.				Overall
Team	W		L	PCT	W		L	PCT
No. 2 Kansas †	15	–	1	.938	35	–	4	.897
Oklahoma State	11	–	5	.688	22	–	7	.759
Oklahoma	11	–	5	.688	22	–	11	.667
Nebraska	10	–	6	.625	20	–	12	.625
Baylor	8	–	8	.500	14	–	14	.500
Missouri	8	–	8	.500	17	–	15	.531
Texas Tech	7	–	9	.438	13	–	14	.481
Kansas State	7	–	9	.438	17	–	12	.586
Colorado	7	–	9	.438	13	–	14	.481
Texas	6	–	10	.375	14	–	17	.452
Iowa State	5	–	11	.313	12	–	18	.400
Texas A&M	1	–	15	.063	7	–	20	.259
† 1998 Big 12 Tournament winner Rankings from AP poll

The 1997–98 Oklahoma State Cowboys basketball team represented Oklahoma State University as a member of the Big 12 Conference during the 1997–98 NCAA Division I men's basketball season. They were led by 8th-year head coach Eddie Sutton and played their home games at Gallagher-Iba Arena in Stillwater, Oklahoma. They finished the season 22–7, 11–5 in Big 12 play to finish in a tie for second place. The Cowboys lost to Texas in the quarterfinals of the Big 12 tournament. The team received an at-large bid to the NCAA tournament as the No. 8 seed in the Southeast region. Oklahoma State defeated George Washington in the opening round before losing to No. 1 seed Duke in the second round.

== Roster ==
1997–98 Oklahoma State Cowboys men's basketball team
Players
Coaches

Pos.	#	Name	Height	Weight	Year	Previous school	Hometown
F	34	Desmond Mason	6 ft 5 in (1.96 m)	210 lb (95 kg)	So	Waxahachie	Waxahachie, Texas
G	44	Doug Gottlieb	6 ft 1 in (1.85 m)	—	So	Notre Dame	Milwaukee, Wisconsin

Head coach

- Eddie Sutton

Assistant coach(es)

- Sean Sutton

Legend

- (C) Team captain
- (S) Suspended
- (I) Ineligible
- (W) Walk-on
- Injured
- Current redshirt

== Schedule and results ==
Date time, TV	Rank^{#}	Opponent^{#}	Result	Record	Site city, state
Regular season
Nov 15, 1997*; 7:05 p.m.		Texas–Pan American	W 103–71	1–0	Gallagher-Iba Arena (5,513); Stillwater, Oklahoma
Nov 22, 1997*; 7:05 p.m.		Creighton	W 86–70	2–0	Gallagher-Iba Arena (5,538); Stillwater, Oklahoma
Nov 25, 1997*; 7:05 p.m.		Southern Utah	W 79–58	3–0	Gallagher-Iba Arena (5,514); Stillwater, Oklahoma
Nov 29, 1997*; 7:05 p.m.		North Texas	W 98–60	4–0	Gallagher-Iba Arena (5,721); Stillwater, Oklahoma
Dec 2, 1997*; 7:05 p.m.		Oral Roberts	W 73–66	5–0	Gallagher-Iba Arena (6,254); Stillwater, Oklahoma
Dec 6, 1997*; 2:05 p.m.		Washington	W 81–66	6–0	Gallagher-Iba Arena (5,942); Stillwater, Oklahoma
Dec 10, 1997*; 7:05 p.m.		vs. Arizona State	W 79–68	7–0	The Myriad (8,123); Oklahoma City, Oklahoma
Dec 20, 1997*; 2:05 p.m.		Jackson State	W 60–58	8–0	Gallagher-Iba Arena (5,515); Stillwater, Oklahoma
Dec 23, 1997*; 6:05 p.m.		Arkansas State	W 78–62	9–0	Gallagher-Iba Arena (5,749); Stillwater, Oklahoma
Dec 30, 1997*; 7:05 p.m.		at TCU	W 82–81	10–0	Daniel-Meyer Coliseum (7,166); Fort Worth, Texas
Jan 3, 1998; 2:00 p.m.		at Texas A&M	W 100–65	11–0 (1–0)	Reed Arena (2,905); College Station, Texas
Jan 7, 1998; 7:05 p.m.		Nebraska	L 62–67	11–1 (1–1)	Gallagher-Iba Arena (6,319); Stillwater, Oklahoma
Jan 10, 1998; 8:30 p.m.		Texas Tech	W 66–63	12–1 (2–1)	Gallagher-Iba Arena (6,017); Stillwater, Oklahoma
Jan 14, 1998; 7:00 p.m.	No. 25	at Missouri	L 64–70	12–2 (2–2)	Hearnes Center (13,300); Columbia, Missouri
Jan 17, 1998; 3:00 p.m.		at Baylor	L 95–97 ^{2OT}	12–3 (2–3)	Ferrell Center (9,175); Waco, Texas
Jan 24, 1998; 12:45 p.m.		Texas A&M	W 94–62	13–3 (3–3)	Gallagher-Iba Arena (6,294); Stillwater, Oklahoma
Jan 26, 1998; 8:37 p.m.		at Oklahoma; Bedlam Series	W 88–84	14–3 (4–3)	Lloyd Noble Center (12,093); Norman, Oklahoma
Jan 31, 1998; 12:47 p.m.		at Texas	L 73–88	14–4 (4–4)	Frank Erwin Center (11,109); Austin, Texas
Feb 3, 1998; 7:05 p.m.		Colorado	W 86–74 ^{OT}	15–4 (5–4)	Gallagher-Iba Arena (6,081); Stillwater, Oklahoma
Feb 7, 1998; 12:45 p.m.		Baylor	W 85–72	16–4 (6–4)	Gallagher-Iba Arena (6,184); Stillwater, Oklahoma
Feb 9, 1998; 7:00 p.m., ESPN2		at Iowa State	W 81–66	17–4 (7–4)	Hilton Coliseum (10,210); Ames, Iowa
Feb 14, 1998; 12:45 p.m.		Oklahoma; Bedlam Series	W 70–66	18–4 (8–4)	Gallagher-Iba Arena (6,381); Stillwater, Oklahoma
Feb 18, 1998; 7:00 p.m.		at Texas Tech	W 83–81 ^{OT}	19–4 (9–4)	Lubbock Municipal Coliseum (7,342); Lubbock, Texas
Feb 21, 1998; 7:05 p.m.		at Kansas State	W 64–61	20–4 (10–4)	Bramlage Coliseum (12,081); Manhattan, Kansas
Feb 24, 1998; 8:00 p.m.	No. 25	Texas	W 80–58	21–4 (11–4)	Gallagher-Iba Arena (6,359); Stillwater, Oklahoma
Mar 1, 1998; 11:30 a.m.	No. 25	No. 4 Kansas	L 67–71	21–5 (11–5)	Gallagher-Iba Arena (6,381); Stillwater, Oklahoma
Big 12 Tournament
Mar 6, 1998*; 6:00 p.m., B12N	(2) No. 25	vs. (10) Texas; Quarterfinals	L 64–65	21–6	Kemper Arena (15,400); Kansas City, Missouri
NCAA Tournament
Mar 13, 1998*	(8 SE)	vs. (9 SE) George Washington; First Round	W 74–59	22–6	Rupp Arena (16,824); Lexington, Kentucky
Mar 15, 1998*; 12:10 p.m.	(8 SE)	vs. (1 SE) No. 3 Duke; Second Round	L 73–79	22–7	Rupp Arena (13,220); Lexington, Kentucky
*Non-conference game. ^{#}Rankings from AP poll. (#) Tournament seedings in parentheses. SE=Southeast. All times are in Central Time.
