= 1997–98 New Mexico Lobos men's basketball team =

American college basketball season

1997–98 New Mexico Lobos men's basketball

NCAA tournament, Second round
- Conference: Western Athletic Conference
- Mountain

Ranking
- Coaches: No. 21
- AP: No. 18
- Record: 24–8 (11–3 WAC)
- Head coach: Dave Bliss (10th season)
- Home arena: University Arena

1997–98 WAC men's basketball standings
	Conf.				Overall
Team	W		L	PCT	W		L	PCT
Mountain
No. 7 Utah	12	–	2	.857	30	–	4	.882
No. 18 New Mexico	11	–	3	.786	24	–	8	.750
Wyoming	9	–	5	.643	19	–	9	.679
Colorado State	8	–	6	.571	20	–	9	.690
UNLV †	7	–	7	.500	20	–	13	.606
BYU	4	–	10	.286	9	–	21	.300
UTEP	3	–	11	.214	12	–	14	.462
Air Force	2	–	12	.143	10	–	16	.385
Pacific
No. 15 TCU	14	–	0	1.000	27	–	6	.818
Fresno State	10	–	4	.714	21	–	13	.618
Tulsa	9	–	5	.643	19	–	12	.613
Hawaii	8	–	6	.571	21	–	9	.700
SMU	6	–	8	.429	18	–	10	.643
San Diego State	5	–	9	.357	13	–	15	.464
Rice	3	–	11	.214	6	–	22	.214
San Jose State	1	–	13	.071	3	–	23	.115
† 1998 WAC tournament winner Rankings from AP Poll

The 1997–98 New Mexico Lobos men's basketball team represented the University of New Mexico as a member of the Western Athletic Conference during the 1997–98 NCAA Division I men's basketball season. The Lobos were coached by head coach Dave Bliss and played their home games at the University Arena, also known as "The Pit", in Albuquerque, New Mexico. New Mexico finished 2nd in the WAC Mountain division regular season standings and lost to UNLV in the WAC Tournament championship game. The Lobos received an at-large bid to the NCAA tournament as No. 4 seed in the South region. After defeating Butler in the opening round, New Mexico was bounced in the round of 32 by Syracuse, 56–46, to finish with a 24–8 record (11–3 WAC).

== Roster ==
1997–98 New Mexico Lobos men's basketball team
Players
Coaches

Pos.	#	Name	Height	Weight	Year	Hometown
G	3	Lamont Long	6 ft 4 in (1.93 m)	—	So
F	4	Kenny Thomas	6 ft 7 in (2.01 m)	230 lb (104 kg)	Jr	Albuquerque, New Mexico
F	22	Clayton Shields	6 ft 8 in (2.03 m)	205 lb (93 kg)	Sr	Baytown, Texas
G	32	David Gibson	6 ft 2 in (1.88 m)	—	Sr

Head coach

- Dave Bliss

Assistant coach(es)

Legend

- (C) Team captain
- (S) Suspended
- (I) Ineligible
- (W) Walk-on
- Injured
- Current redshirt

== Schedule and results ==
Date time, TV	Rank^{#}	Opponent^{#}	Result	Record	Site (attendance) city, state
Regular season
Nov 11, 1997*	No. 11	USC	W 98–76	1–0	University Arena; Albuquerque, New Mexico
Nov 19, 1997*	No. 11	New Mexico State	W 80–79	2–0	University Arena; Albuquerque, New Mexico
Nov 21, 1997*		Texas Southern	W 90–67	3–0	University Arena; Albuquerque, New Mexico
Nov 22, 1997*		Arkansas State	W 61–51	4–0	University Arena; Albuquerque, New Mexico
Nov 29, 1997*		San Jose State	W 86–57	5–0	University Arena; Albuquerque, New Mexico
Dec 6, 1997*	No. 8	vs. No. 15 UCLA; Wooden Classic	L 58–69	5–1	Arrowhead Pond of Anaheim; Anaheim, California
Dec 9, 1997*		at New Mexico State	W 62–59	6–1	Pan American Center; Las Cruces, New Mexico
Dec 20, 1997*		Texas Tech	W 81–62	7–1	University Arena; Albuquerque, New Mexico
Dec 29, 1997*		Holy Cross	W 112–61	8–1	University Arena; Albuquerque, New Mexico
Dec 30, 1997*		Yale	W 69–44	9–1	University Arena; Albuquerque, New Mexico
Jan 3, 1998*		Air Force	W 92–59	10–1	University Arena; Albuquerque, New Mexico
Jan 5, 1998*		TCU	W 98–77	11–1	University Arena; Albuquerque, New Mexico
WAC tournament
Mar 5, 1998*		vs. Tulsa; Quarterfinals	W 60–59	22–6	Thomas & Mack Center; Las Vegas, Nevada
Mar 6, 1998*		vs. No. 13 TCU; Semifinals	W 80–73	23–6	Thomas & Mack Center; Las Vegas, Nevada
Mar 7, 1998*		at UNLV; Championship game	L 51–56	23–7	Thomas & Mack Center; Las Vegas, Nevada
NCAA tournament
Mar 13, 1998*	(4 S) No. 18	vs. (13 S) Butler; First Round	W 79–62	24–7	Rupp Arena; Lexington, Kentucky
Mar 15, 1998*	(4 S) No. 18	vs. (5 S) No. 21 Syracuse; Second Round	L 46–56	24–8	Rupp Arena; Lexington, Kentucky
*Non-conference game. ^{#}Rankings from AP poll. (#) Tournament seedings in parentheses. S=South.
