= 1997–98 Detroit Titans men's basketball team =

American college basketball season

1997–98 Detroit Titans men's basketball
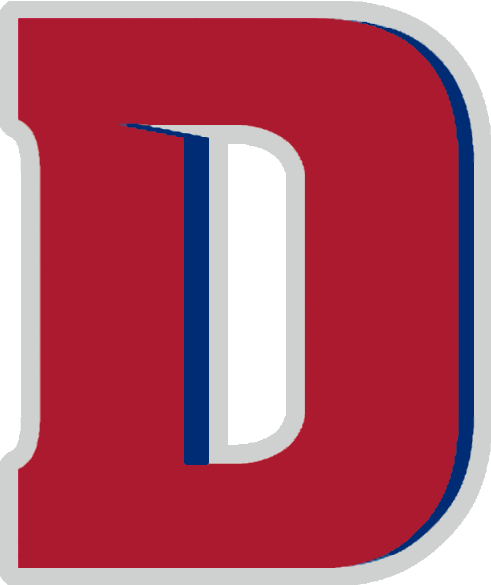

Midwestern Collegiate Conference Regular season champions

NCAA tournament, second round
- Conference: Midwestern Collegiate Conference
- Record: 25–6 (12–2 MCC)
- Head coach: Perry Watson (5th season)
- Home arena: Calihan Hall

1997–98 Midwestern Collegiate Conference men's basketball standings
	Conf.				Overall
Team	W		L	PCT	W		L	PCT
Detroit	12	–	2	.857	25	–	6	.806
UIC	12	–	2	.857	22	–	6	.786
Butler †	8	–	6	.571	22	–	11	.667
Green Bay	7	–	7	.500	17	–	12	.586
Cleveland State	6	–	8	.429	12	–	15	.444
Loyola Chicago	6	–	8	.429	15	–	15	.500
Wright State	3	–	11	.214	10	–	18	.357
Milwaukee	2	–	12	.143	3	–	24	.111
† 1998 MCC tournament winner

The 1997–98 Detroit Titans men's basketball team represented the University of Detroit Mercy in the 1997–98 NCAA Division I men's basketball season. Led by coach Perry Watson, the Titans played their home games at Calihan Hall as members of the Midwestern Collegiate Conference. They finished the season 25–6 overall, 12–2 in MCC play to win the regular season league title.

Playing in the MCC tournament as the No. 1 seed, they defeated UW-Milwaukee in the quarterfinals before losing to Green Bay in the semifinals. Despite the early exit, Detroit received an at-large bid to the NCAA tournament as No. 10 seed in the Midwest region. The Titans beat No. 7 seed St. John's in the opening round before losing to No. 2 seed Purdue in the second round.

This 1997–98 team, which tied the school record with 25 wins and reached the NCAA Tournament for the first time since 1979, was honored 20 years later.

== Roster ==
1997–98 Detroit Titans men's basketball team
Players
Coaches

Pos.	#	Name	Height	Weight	Year	Hometown
G		Jermaine Jackson	6 ft 4 in (1.93 m)	—	Jr	Detroit, MI
G		Rashad Phillips	5 ft 10 in (1.78 m)	—	Fr	Detroit, MI
G		Desmond Ferguson	6 ft 7 in (2.01 m)	—	So	Lansing, MI

Head coach

- Perry Watson

Assistant coach(es)

Legend

- (C) Team captain
- (S) Suspended
- (I) Ineligible
- (W) Walk-on
- Injured
- Current redshirt

Roster

== Schedule and results ==
Date time, TV	Rank^{#}	Opponent^{#}	Result	Record	Site city, state
Regular season
Nov 17, 1997*		at Cincinnati	L 66–76	0–1	Fifth Third Arena; Cincinnati, Ohio
Nov 25, 1997*		Wayne State	W 95–59	1–1	Calihan Hall; Detroit, Michigan
Nov 30, 1997*		Michigan	L 53–54	1–2	Cobo Arena; Detroit, Michigan
Dec 3, 1997*		Bowling Green	W 73–52	2–2	Calihan Hall; Detroit, Michigan
Dec 6, 1997*; 2:00 pm		Western Michigan	W 77–59	3–2	Calihan Hall; Detroit, Michigan
Dec 13, 1997*; 7:00 pm, ESPN Plus		at Michigan State	W 68–65	4–2	Breslin Student Events Center; East Lansing, Michigan
Dec 16, 1997*		Central Michigan	W 77–53	5–2	Calihan Hall; Detroit, Michigan
Dec 18, 1997*		at Georgia State	W 74–64	6–2	GSU Sports Arena; Atlanta, Georgia
Dec 20, 1997*		vs. Grambling State; ISU Holiday Challenge	W 74–52	7–2	Hilton Coliseum; Ames, Iowa
Dec 21, 1997*; 9:00 pm, CTN		at Iowa State; ISU Holiday Challenge	W 67–56	8–2	Hilton Coliseum (8,026); Ames, Iowa
Dec 27, 1997*		at Texas Southern	W 90–75	9–2	Health and Physical Education Arena; Houston, Texas
Dec 31, 1997*		at Bethune–Cookman	W 79–65	10–2	Moore Gymnasium; Daytona Beach, Florida
Jan 3, 1998		UW-Milwaukee	W 83–56	11–2 (1–0)	Calihan Hall; Detroit, Michigan
Jan 5, 1998		Green Bay	W 58–41	12–2 (2–0)	Calihan Hall; Detroit, Michigan
Jan 11, 1998		at Illinois-Chicago	L 83–88	12–3 (2–1)	UIC Pavilion; Chicago, Illinois
Jan 15, 1998		Wright State	W 80–75	13–3 (3–1)	Calihan Hall; Detroit, Michigan
Jan 17, 1998		Butler	W 78–67	14–3 (4–1)	Calihan Hall (4,076); Detroit, Michigan
Jan 19, 1998		at Loyola (IL)	W 76–71	15–3 (5–1)	Joseph J. Gentile Arena; Chicago, Illinois
Jan 24, 1998		Cleveland State	W 84–70	16–3 (6–1)	Calihan Hall; Detroit, Michigan
Jan 29, 1998		at UW-Milwaukee	W 83–68	17–3 (7–1)	Wisconsin Center Arena; Milwaukee, Wisconsin
Jan 31, 1998		at Green Bay	W 67–64 ^{OT}	18–3 (8–1)	Brown County Arena; Ashwaubenon, Wisconsin
Feb 5, 1998		Loyola (IL)	W 94–65	19–3 (9–1)	Calihan Hall; Detroit, Michigan
Feb 7, 1998		Illinois-Chicago	W 76–58	20–3 (10–1)	Calihan Hall; Detroit, Michigan
Feb 12, 1998		at Butler	W 54–51	21–3 (11–1)	Hinkle Fieldhouse (4,213); Indianapolis, Indiana
Feb 14, 1998		at Wright State	W 68–60	22–3 (12–1)	Ervin J. Nutter Center; Fairborn, Ohio
Feb 18, 1998*; 7:05 pm		Oakland	W 110–61	23–3	Calihan Hall; Detroit, Michigan
Feb 21, 1998		at Cleveland State	L 57–60	23–4 (12–2)	Henry J. Goodman Arena; Cleveland, Ohio
MCC tournament
Feb 28, 1998	(1)	vs. (8) UW-Milwaukee; Quarterfinals	W 74–60	24–4	Brown County Arena; Ashwaubenon, Wisconsin
Mar 1, 1998	(1)	at (4) Green Bay; Semifinals	L 65–68	24–5	Brown County Arena; Ashwaubenon, Wisconsin
NCAA tournament
Mar 13, 1998*	(10 MW)	vs. (7 MW) St. John's; First Round	W 66–64	25–5	United Center; Chicago, Illinois
Mar 15, 1998*	(10 MW)	vs. (2 MW) No. 11 Purdue; Second Round	L 65–80	25–6	United Center; Chicago, Illinois
*Non-conference game. ^{#}Rankings from AP poll. (#) Tournament seedings in parentheses. MW=Midwest. All times are in Eastern Time.
