= 1997–98 UNLV Runnin' Rebels basketball team =

American college basketball season

1997–98 UNLV Runnin' Rebels basketball

WAC tournament champions

NCAA tournament, first round
- Conference: Western Athletic Conference
- Mountain Division
- Record: 20–13 (7–7 WAC)
- Head coach: Bill Bayno (3rd season)
- Assistant coaches: Dave Rice (4th season); Glynn Cyprien (3rd season)
- Home arena: Thomas & Mack Center

1997–98 WAC men's basketball standings
	Conf.				Overall
Team	W		L	PCT	W		L	PCT
Mountain
No. 7 Utah	12	–	2	.857	30	–	4	.882
No. 18 New Mexico	11	–	3	.786	24	–	8	.750
Wyoming	9	–	5	.643	19	–	9	.679
Colorado State	8	–	6	.571	20	–	9	.690
UNLV †	7	–	7	.500	20	–	13	.606
BYU	4	–	10	.286	9	–	21	.300
UTEP	3	–	11	.214	12	–	14	.462
Air Force	2	–	12	.143	10	–	16	.385
Pacific
No. 15 TCU	14	–	0	1.000	27	–	6	.818
Fresno State	10	–	4	.714	21	–	13	.618
Tulsa	9	–	5	.643	19	–	12	.613
Hawaii	8	–	6	.571	21	–	9	.700
SMU	6	–	8	.429	18	–	10	.643
San Diego State	5	–	9	.357	13	–	15	.464
Rice	3	–	11	.214	6	–	22	.214
San Jose State	1	–	13	.071	3	–	23	.115
† 1998 WAC tournament winner Rankings from AP Poll

The 1997–98 UNLV Runnin' Rebels basketball team represented the University of Nevada, Las Vegas. The team was coached by Bill Bayno and played their home games at the Thomas & Mack Center on UNLV's main campus in Paradise, Nevada as a member of the Western Athletic Conference. The Runnin' Rebels finished the season 20–13, 7–7 in WAC play. They won the 1998 WAC men's basketball tournament to receive an automatic bid to the 1998 NCAA Division I men's basketball tournament, earning a No. 12 seed in the East Region. The Runnin' Rebels lost to No. 5 seed Princeton in the opening round. This was the first NCAA Tournament appearance for the program since back-to-back Final Four appearances in 1990 and 1991.

== Roster ==
1997–98 UNLV Rebels men's basketball team
Players
Coaches

Pos.	#	Name	Height	Weight	Year	Previous school	Hometown
G	11	Mark Dickel	6 ft 2 in (1.88 m)	190 lb (86 kg)	So	Logan Park	Dunedin, New Zealand
G/F	33	Tyrone Nesby	6 ft 6 in (1.98 m)	220 lb (100 kg)	Sr	Cairo	Cairo, Illinois
C	34	Kaspars Kambala	6 ft 9 in (2.06 m)	265 lb (120 kg)	Fr	Homestead

Head coach

- Bill Bayno

Assistant coach(es)

- Dave Rice (UNLV)
- Glynn Cyprien (Southern–New Orleans)

Legend

- (C) Team captain
- (S) Suspended
- (I) Ineligible
- (W) Walk-on
- Injured
- Current redshirt

Roster

== Schedule and results ==
Date time, TV	Rank^{#}	Opponent^{#}	Result	Record	Site (attendance) city, state
Non-conference regular season
Nov 15, 1997*		Loyola Marymount	W 96–81	1–0	Thomas & Mack Center (15,115); Las Vegas, Nevada
Nov 17, 1997*		Eastern Michigan	W 84–66	2–0	Thomas & Mack Center (4,692); Las Vegas, Nevada
Nov 21, 1997*		at No. 2 Kansas; Preseason NIT second round	L 68–92	2–1	Allen Fieldhouse (15,701); Lawrence, Kansas
Dec 2, 1997*		at USC	W 82–72	3–1	L.A. Sports Arena (2,949); Los Angeles, California
Dec 6, 1997*		at Michigan	L 59–83	3–2	Crisler Arena (12,333); Ann Arbor, Michigan
Dec 13, 1997*		at Rhode Island	L 73–91	3–3	Keaney Gymnasium (6,429); Kingston, Rhode Island
Dec 17, 1997*		Chicago State	W 86–49	4–3	Thomas & Mack Center (14,141); Las Vegas, Nevada
Dec 20, 1997*		No. 25 Syracuse	L 64–71	4–4	Thomas & Mack Center (13,146); Las Vegas, Nevada
Dec 23, 1997*		UC Irvine	W 77–55	5–4	Thomas & Mack Center (12,913); Las Vegas, Nevada
Dec 27, 1997*		No. 9 UCLA	L 57–65	5–5	Thomas & Mack Center (17,490); Las Vegas, Nevada
Dec 30, 1997*		Nevada	W 62–50	6–5	Thomas & Mack Center (14,097); Las Vegas, Nevada
Jan 4, 1998*		at Tulane	W 77–61	7–5	Avron B. Fogelman Arena (3,395); New Orleans, Louisiana
WAC regular season
Jan 10, 1998		Air Force	W 88–77	8–5 (1–0)	Thomas & Mack Center (15,032); Las Vegas, Nevada
Jan 15, 1998		at No. 15 New Mexico	L 61–79	8–6 (1–1)	University Arena (17,817); Albuquerque, New Mexico
Jan 17, 1998		at UTEP	L 50–62	8–7 (1–2)	Don Haskins Center (9,171); El Paso, Texas
Jan 22, 1998		BYU	W 76–63	9–7 (2–2)	Thomas & Mack Center (13,461); Las Vegas, Nevada
Jan 24, 1998		No. 4 Utah	L 54–67	9–8 (2–3)	Thomas & Mack Center (15,488); Las Vegas, Nevada
Jan 26, 1998*		Chaminade	W 77–49	10–8	Thomas & Mack Center (13,144); Las Vegas, Nevada
Jan 29, 1998		at Colorado State	L 57–60	10–9 (2–4)	Moby Arena (7,172); Fort Collins, Colorado
Jan 31, 1998		at Wyoming	L 62–73	10–10 (2–5)	Arena-Auditorium (9,079); Laramie, Wyoming
Feb 5, 1998		at Air Force	W 59–57	11–10 (3–5)	Clune Arena (1,017); Colorado Springs, Colorado
Feb 7, 1998*		Wofford	W 79–52	12–10	Thomas & Mack Center (13,548); Las Vegas, Nevada
Feb 14, 1998		UTEP	W 69–63	13–10 (4–5)	Thomas & Mack Center (13,450); Las Vegas, Nevada
Feb 16, 1998		No. 11 New Mexico	L 66–75	13–11 (4–6)	Thomas & Mack Center (14,130); Las Vegas, Nevada
Feb 21, 1998		at BYU	W 84–76	14–11 (5–6)	Marriott Center (9,404); Provo, Utah
Feb 23, 1998		at No. 5 Utah	L 68–79	14–12 (5–7)	Jon M. Huntsman Center (13,291); Salt Lake City, Utah
Feb 26, 1998		Wyoming	W 72–66	15–12 (6–7)	Thomas & Mack Center (13,612); Las Vegas, Nevada
Feb 28, 1998		Colorado State	W 78–66	16–12 (7–7)	Thomas & Mack Center (14,868); Las Vegas, Nevada
WAC tournament
Mar 3, 1998*		Hawaii; First round	W 64–59	17–12	Thomas & Mack Center (13,878); Las Vegas, Nevada
Mar 5, 1998*		No. 5 Utah; Quarterfinals	W 54–51	18–12	Thomas & Mack Center (14,340); Las Vegas, Nevada
Mar 6, 1998*		Fresno State; Semifinals	W 76–67	19–12	Thomas & Mack Center (17,904); Las Vegas, Nevada
Mar 7, 1998*		No. 20 New Mexico; Championship game	W 56–51	20–12	Thomas & Mack Center (16,101); Las Vegas, Nevada
NCAA tournament
Mar 12, 1998*	(12 E)	vs. (5 E) No. 8 Princeton; First round	L 57–69	20–13	Hartford Civic Center (16,105); Hartford, Connecticut
*Non-conference game. ^{#}Rankings from AP poll/Coaches' Poll. (#) Tournament seedings in parentheses. E=East. All times are in Pacific Time.
