= 1998 Midwestern Collegiate Conference men's basketball tournament =

- Classification: Division I
- Season: 1997–98
- Teams: 8
- Site: Brown County Veterans Memorial Arena; Green Bay, WI
- Champions: Butler
- Winning coach: Barry Collier (2nd title)
- MVP: Jon Neuhouser, Butler (Butler)

1997–98 Midwestern Collegiate Conference men's basketball standings
	Conf.				Overall
Team	W		L	PCT	W		L	PCT
Detroit	12	–	2	.857	25	–	6	.806
UIC	12	–	2	.857	22	–	6	.786
Butler †	8	–	6	.571	22	–	11	.667
Green Bay	7	–	7	.500	17	–	12	.586
Cleveland State	6	–	8	.429	12	–	15	.444
Loyola Chicago	6	–	8	.429	15	–	15	.500
Wright State	3	–	11	.214	10	–	18	.357
Milwaukee	2	–	12	.143	3	–	24	.111
† 1998 MCC tournament winner

The 1998 Midwestern Collegiate Conference men's basketball tournament took place at the end of the 1997–98 regular season. The tournament was hosted by Green Bay.

== Seeds ==
All Midwestern Collegiate Conference schools played in the tournament. Teams were seeded by 1997–98 Midwestern Collegiate Conference season record, with a tiebreaker system to seed teams with identical conference records.

== Bracket ==
Quarterfinals
1	Detroit	74
8	Milwaukee	60
4	Green Bay	82
5	Cleveland State	53
2	UIC	73
7	Wright State	74
3	Butler	62
6	Loyola Chicago	53

Semifinals
1	Detroit	65
4	Green Bay	68
7	Wright State	48
3	Butler	67

Championship
4	Green Bay	51
3	Butler	70
