= 1998 WAC men's basketball tournament =

- Classification: Division I
- Season: 1997–98
- Teams: 12
- Site: Thomas & Mack Center; Paradise, NV
- Champions: UNLV (1st title)
- Winning coach: Bill Bayno (1st title)
- MVP: Kenny Thomas (New Mexico)

1997–98 WAC men's basketball standings
	Conf.				Overall
Team	W		L	PCT	W		L	PCT
Mountain
No. 7 Utah	12	–	2	.857	30	–	4	.882
No. 18 New Mexico	11	–	3	.786	24	–	8	.750
Wyoming	9	–	5	.643	19	–	9	.679
Colorado State	8	–	6	.571	20	–	9	.690
UNLV †	7	–	7	.500	20	–	13	.606
BYU	4	–	10	.286	9	–	21	.300
UTEP	3	–	11	.214	12	–	14	.462
Air Force	2	–	12	.143	10	–	16	.385
Pacific
No. 15 TCU	14	–	0	1.000	27	–	6	.818
Fresno State	10	–	4	.714	21	–	13	.618
Tulsa	9	–	5	.643	19	–	12	.613
Hawaii	8	–	6	.571	21	–	9	.700
SMU	6	–	8	.429	18	–	10	.643
San Diego State	5	–	9	.357	13	–	15	.464
Rice	3	–	11	.214	6	–	22	.214
San Jose State	1	–	13	.071	3	–	23	.115
† 1998 WAC tournament winner Rankings from AP Poll

The 1998 Western Athletic Conference men's basketball tournament was held March 3–7 at the Thomas & Mack Center at the University of Nevada, Las Vegas in Paradise, Nevada.

Hosts UNLV upset New Mexico in the championship game, 56–51, to clinch their first WAC men's tournament championship.

The Rebels, in turn, received an automatic bid to the 1998 NCAA tournament. They were joined in the tournament by three other WAC members, New Mexico, TCU, and Utah, who all earned at-large bids. Utah, who was also the WAC regular season champion, ultimately went on to the national championship game, losing to Kentucky, while knocking off San Francisco, Arkansas, West Virginia, Arizona, and North Carolina on their way to title game.

== Format ==
No changes were made to the tournament format from the 1997 tournament. Teams were again seeded based on their position within either the Mountain or Pacific Division (top six teams only).

== Bracket ==
First round Tuesday, March 3
P5	SMU	76
M4	Colorado State	71
P3	Tulsa	59
M6	BYU	56
M3	Wyoming	57
P6	San Diego State	60
P4	Hawaii	59
M5	UNLV	64

Quarterfinals; Thursday, March 5
P1	#13 TCU	71
P5	SMU	69
M2	#20 New Mexico	60
P3	Tulsa	59
P2	Fresno State	92
P6	San Diego State	57
M5	UNLV	54
M1	#5 Utah	51

Semifinals; Friday, March 6
P1	#13 TCU	73
M2	#20 New Mexico	80
P2	Fresno State	67
M5	UNLV	76

Championship; Saturday, March 7
M2	#20 New Mexico	51
M5	UNLV	56
