= 1997–98 Nebraska Cornhuskers men's basketball team =

American college basketball season

1997–98 Nebraska Cornhuskers men's basketball

NCAA tournament, First Round
- Conference: Big Eight Conference
- Record: 20–12 (10–6 Big Eight)
- Head coach: Danny Nee (12th season)
- Assistant coaches: Jimmy Williams; Scott Howard; Bill Johnson
- Home arena: Bob Devaney Sports Center

1997–98 Big 12 men's basketball standings
	Conf.				Overall
Team	W		L	PCT	W		L	PCT
No. 2 Kansas †	15	–	1	.938	35	–	4	.897
Oklahoma State	11	–	5	.688	22	–	7	.759
Oklahoma	11	–	5	.688	22	–	11	.667
Nebraska	10	–	6	.625	20	–	12	.625
Baylor	8	–	8	.500	14	–	14	.500
Missouri	8	–	8	.500	17	–	15	.531
Texas Tech	7	–	9	.438	13	–	14	.481
Kansas State	7	–	9	.438	17	–	12	.586
Colorado	7	–	9	.438	13	–	14	.481
Texas	6	–	10	.375	14	–	17	.452
Iowa State	5	–	11	.313	12	–	18	.400
Texas A&M	1	–	15	.063	7	–	20	.259
† 1998 Big 12 Tournament winner Rankings from AP poll

The 1997–98 Nebraska Cornhuskers men's basketball team represented the University of Nebraska–Lincoln during the 1997–98 college basketball season. Led by head coach Danny Nee (12th season), the Cornhuskers competed in the Big 12 Conference and played their home games at the Bob Devaney Sports Center. They finished with a record of 20–12 overall and 10–6 in Big 12 Conference play. After placing 4th in the conference standings, and losing in the semifinals of the Big 12 tournament, Nebraska received an at-large bid to the NCAA tournament – the fifth and final appearance under Coach Nee – as No. 11 seed in the West region. The Cornhuskers were beaten by No. 6 seed Arkansas in the opening round.

== Roster ==
1997–98 Nebraska Cornhuskers men's basketball team
Players
Coaches

Pos.	#	Name	Height	Weight	Year	Previous school	Hometown
G	3	Cary Cochran	6 ft 2 in (1.88 m)	180 lb (82 kg)	Fr	Tri-Center	Minden, IA
C	4	Venson Hamilton	6 ft 10 in (2.08 m)	235 lb (107 kg)	Jr	Oak Hill Academy	Forest City, NC
F	5	Larry Florence	6 ft 5 in (1.96 m)	220 lb (100 kg)	Jr	Central	Phenix City, AL
G	10	Tyronn Lue	6 ft 0 in (1.83 m)	165 lb (75 kg)	Jr	Raytown	Mexico, MO
G	11	Rodney Williams	6 ft 3 in (1.91 m)	195 lb (88 kg)	Fr	The Kinkaid School	Houston, TX
F	15	Chad Johnson	6 ft 6 in (1.98 m)	220 lb (100 kg)	Fr	Florida A&M	Monticello, FL
G	20	Todd Smith	6 ft 4 in (1.93 m)	195 lb (88 kg)	Fr	Baldwin	Milledgeville, GA
G	24	Michael Johnette	6 ft 4 in (1.93 m)	215 lb (98 kg)	Sr	Millard North	Omaha, NE
G	30	Cookie Belcher	6 ft 3 in (1.91 m)	205 lb (93 kg)	So	Mexico	Mexico, MO
F	34	Troy Piatkowski	6 ft 5 in (1.96 m)	195 lb (88 kg)	Jr	Stevens	Rapid City, SD
G	35	Ryan Phifer	6 ft 3 in (1.91 m)	205 lb (93 kg)	Sr	North Platte	North Platte, NE
F	40	Chad Burbach	6 ft 6 in (1.98 m)	180 lb (82 kg)	Sr	Scotus	Columbus, NE
F	44	Andy Markowski	6 ft 8 in (2.03 m)	215 lb (98 kg)	Jr	Ord	Ord, NE
C	52	Brant Harriman	6 ft 10 in (2.08 m)	250 lb (113 kg)	Fr	Mason City	Mason City, IA

Head coach

Danny Nee

Assistant coach(es)

- Jimmy Williams
- Scott Howard
- Bill Johnson

Legend

- (C) Team captain
- (S) Suspended
- (I) Ineligible
- (W) Walk-on
- Injured
- Current redshirt

Roster

== Schedule and results ==
Date time, TV	Rank^{#}	Opponent^{#}	Result	Record	Site city, state
Regular season
Nov 16, 1997*		UNC Greensboro	W 75–51	1–0	Bob Devaney Sports Center; Lincoln, Nebraska
Nov 19, 1997*		Western Illinois	W 86–57	2–0	Bob Devaney Sports Center; Lincoln, Nebraska
Nov 22, 1997*		New Orleans	W 81–66	3–0	Bob Devaney Sports Center; Lincoln, Nebraska
Nov 25, 1997*		Colorado State	W 64–57	4–0	Bob Devaney Sports Center; Lincoln, Nebraska
Nov 29, 1997*		UTSA	W 68–59	5–0	Bob Devaney Sports Center; Lincoln, Nebraska
Dec 1, 1997*		at Tulsa	L 68–85	5–1	Tulsa Convention Center; Tulsa, Oklahoma
Dec 5, 1997*		UNC Wilmington	W 85–68	6–1	Bob Devaney Sports Center; Lincoln, Nebraska
Dec 6, 1997*		Grambling	W 85–48	7–1	Bob Devaney Sports Center; Lincoln, Nebraska
Dec 10, 1997*		at Creighton; Rivalry	L 73–84	7–2	Omaha Civic Auditorium; Omaha, Nebraska
Dec 13, 1997*		at Minnesota	W 70–66	8–2	Williams Arena; Minneapolis, Minnesota
Dec 27, 1997*; 9:30 p.m.		vs. Virginia; Rainbow Classic	W 80–65	9–2	Special Events Arena; Honolulu, Hawaii
Dec 28, 1997*		at Hawaii; Rainbow Classic	L 62–87	9–3	Special Events Arena; Honolulu, Hawaii
Dec 30, 1997*		vs. Vanderbilt; Rainbow Classic	L 69–80	9–4	Special Events Arena; Honolulu, Hawaii
Jan 3, 1998		at No. 2 Kansas	L 76–96	9–5 (0–1)	Allen Fieldhouse; Lawrence, Kansas
Jan 7, 1998		at Oklahoma State	W 67–62	10–5 (1–1)	Gallagher-Iba Arena; Stillwater, Oklahoma
Jan 11, 1998		Colorado	W 87–72	11–5 (2–1)	Bob Devaney Sports Center; Lincoln, Nebraska
Jan 18, 1998		Oklahoma	W 53–43	12–5 (3–1)	Bob Devaney Sports Center; Lincoln, Nebraska
Jan 21, 1998		at Texas	L 91–105	12–6 (3–2)	Frank Erwin Center; Austin, Texas
Jan 24, 1998; 12:45 p.m.		Iowa State	W 63–49	13–6 (4–2)	Bob Devaney Sports Center (10,565); Lincoln, Nebraska
Jan 28, 1998		at Kansas State	L 49–72	13–7 (4–3)	Bramlage Coliseum; Manhattan, Kansas
Feb 1, 1998		No. 5 Kansas	L 71–82	13–8 (4–4)	Bob Devaney Sports Center; Lincoln, Nebraska
Feb 4, 1998		at Missouri	L 76–81 ^{OT}	13–9 (4–5)	Hearnes Center; Columbia, Missouri
Feb 7, 1998		Kansas State	L 63–69	13–10 (4–6)	Bob Devaney Sports Center; Lincoln, Nebraska
Feb 11, 1998		at Texas A&M	W 75–58	14–10 (5–6)	G. Rollie White Coliseum; College Station, Texas
Feb 14, 1998		Baylor	W 66–55	15–10 (6–6)	Bob Devaney Sports Center; Lincoln, Nebraska
Feb 18, 1998		Missouri	W 67–66 ^{OT}	16–10 (7–6)	Bob Devaney Sports Center; Lincoln, Nebraska
Feb 21, 1998		at Colorado	W 79–71	17–10 (8–6)	Coors Events Center; Boulder, Colorado
Feb 25, 1998		Texas Tech	W 82–65	18–10 (9–6)	Bob Devaney Sports Center; Lincoln, Nebraska
Feb 28, 1998; 7:00 p.m.		at Iowa State	W 70–62	19–10 (10–6)	Hilton Coliseum (13,465); Ames, Iowa
Big 12 Tournament
Mar 6, 1998*	(4)	vs. (5) Baylor; Quarterfinals	W 65–46	20–10	Kemper Arena; Kansas City, Missouri
Mar 7, 1998*	(4)	vs. (1) No. 3 Kansas; Semifinals	L 59–91	20–11	Kemper Arena; Kansas City, Missouri
NCAA tournament
Mar 12, 1998*	(11 W)	vs. (6 W) No. 17 Arkansas; First Round	L 65–74	20–12	BSU Pavilion; Boise, Idaho
*Non-conference game. ^{#}Rankings from AP poll. (#) Tournament seedings in parentheses. W=West. All times are in Central Time.

== Team players drafted into the NBA ==
Round	Pick	Player	NBA club
1	23	Tyronn Lue	Denver Nuggets
