= Neil Dougherty =

American basketball player-coach

Biographical details
- Born: April 14, 1961; Leavenworth, Kansas, U.S.
- Died: July 5, 2011 (aged 50); Indianapolis, Indiana, U.S.

Playing career
- 1979–1981: Army
- 1982–1984: Cameron
- Position: Point guard

Coaching career (HC unless noted)
- 1984–1988: Cameron (assistant)
- 1988–1989: Drake (assistant)
- 1989–1993: Vanderbilt (assistant)
- 1993–1995: South Carolina (assistant)
- 1995–2002: Kansas (assistant)
- 2002–2008: TCU

Head coaching record
- Overall: 75–108
- Tournaments: 2–1 (NIT)

Cornelius Aaron "Neil" Dougherty (April 14, 1961 – July 5, 2011) was an American basketball coach, most recently the head coach at Texas Christian University in Fort Worth, Texas. Dougherty played basketball at West Point for two years under coach Mike Krzyzewski before transferring to Cameron University, where he played his final two years and earned his degree in 1984.

== Assistant coaching career ==
Dougherty began his coaching career in 1984 at Cameron, where he served as an assistant until 1988. He then moved on to take similar positions at Drake, Vanderbilt and South Carolina. He was an assistant of Roy Williams at University of Kansas for many years. He also served under Head Coach Eddie Fogler at Vanderbilt and South Carolina. In 1990 under Fogler and Dougherty, Vanderbilt won the National Invitation Tournament (NIT).

== TCU ==
On March 25, 2002, Dougherty was hired as the 18th head coach at TCU, replacing Billy Tubbs. Because Dougherty's defensive-minded approach clashed with Tubbs' up-tempo, high scoring approach, the team struggled to adjust in his first year, winning just nine games. The next year they improved by three wins, with the season's highlight coming with a nationally-televised 25-point victory over 10th-ranked Louisville, coached by Rick Pitino. In 2004–05, the Horned Frogs finished 21–14, advancing to the quarterfinals of the National Invitational Tournament.

However, after losing star guards Corey Santee and Marcus Shropshire to graduation, the Frogs failed to build on the NIT momentum and stumbled to a 6–25 record in 2005–06. This caused many TCU boosters and local media figures to question whether or not Dougherty was the right person for the job. His 2006–27 team made strides, finishing 13–17, but the season also included an eleven-game losing streak, which did little to quiet Dougherty's critics. Dougherty was fired by TCU on March 16, 2008 after six seasons, only one of which had a winning record.

== Death ==
Dougherty was in Indianapolis working for IHoops, a joint venture between the NBA and NCAA that promotes youth basketball. On July 5, 2011, Dougherty went jogging and never returned. His body was identified on July 8, 2011.

== Head coaching record ==
Record table
Season	Team	Overall	Conference	Standing	Postseason
TCU Horned Frogs (Conference USA) (2002–2005)
2002–03	TCU	9–19	3–13	7th (National)	
2003–04	TCU	12–17	7–9	9th	
2004–05	TCU	21–14	8–8	8th	NIT Quarterfinal
TCU Horned Frogs (Mountain West Conference) (2006–2008)
2005–06	TCU	6–25	2–14	9th	
2006–07	TCU	13–17	4–12	9th	
2007–08	TCU	14–16	6–10	7th	
TCU:		75–108	30–66		
Total:		75–108			
