= 1997–98 TCU Horned Frogs basketball team =

American college basketball season

1997–98 TCU Horned Frogs men's basketball

WAC regular season champions

NCAA tournament, First round
- Conference: Western Athletic Conference
- Pacific

Ranking
- Coaches: No. 25
- AP: No. 15
- Record: 27–6 (14–0 WAC)
- Head coach: Billy Tubbs
- Home arena: Daniel-Meyer Coliseum

1997–98 WAC men's basketball standings
	Conf.				Overall
Team	W		L	PCT	W		L	PCT
Mountain
No. 7 Utah	12	–	2	.857	30	–	4	.882
No. 18 New Mexico	11	–	3	.786	24	–	8	.750
Wyoming	9	–	5	.643	19	–	9	.679
Colorado State	8	–	6	.571	20	–	9	.690
UNLV †	7	–	7	.500	20	–	13	.606
BYU	4	–	10	.286	9	–	21	.300
UTEP	3	–	11	.214	12	–	14	.462
Air Force	2	–	12	.143	10	–	16	.385
Pacific
No. 15 TCU	14	–	0	1.000	27	–	6	.818
Fresno State	10	–	4	.714	21	–	13	.618
Tulsa	9	–	5	.643	19	–	12	.613
Hawaii	8	–	6	.571	21	–	9	.700
SMU	6	–	8	.429	18	–	10	.643
San Diego State	5	–	9	.357	13	–	15	.464
Rice	3	–	11	.214	6	–	22	.214
San Jose State	1	–	13	.071	3	–	23	.115
† 1998 WAC tournament winner Rankings from AP Poll

The 1997–98 TCU Horned Frogs men's basketball team represented Texas Christian University as a member of the Western Athletic Conference during the 1997–98 men's college basketball season. Led by head coach Billy Tubbs, TCU swept through the WAC regular season schedule to earn the regular season title and received an at-large bid to the NCAA tournament as No. 5 seed in the Midwest region. The Horned Frogs were upset in the opening round by No. 12 seed Florida State, 96–87. The team finished with a record of 27–6 (14–0 WAC).

This high-scoring TCU team posted more than 100 points in seven straight games early in the season (peaking with 153 vs. Texas-Rio Grande Valley), exceeded the century mark 14 times on the season in all, and scored 99 points twice more.

Junior forward Lee Nailon established school records for scoring in a single game (53; three games after senior Mike Jones became the first TCU player to score 50 in a game) and season single season (796). He was also named co-Player of the Year in the WAC. Jones and fellow senior Malcolm Johnson finished 1–2 on the single season and career steals lists, while senior James Penny ended his career as the school's all-time leader in blocks (all of which have since been surpassed).

== Roster ==
1997–98 TCU Horned Frogs men's basketball team
Players	Coaches
Pos. / # / Name / Height / Weight / Year / Hometown; F / 54 / Lee Nailon / 6 ft 9 in (2.06 m) / 230 lb (104 kg) / Jr / South Bend, Indiana	Head coach: Billy Tubbs; Assistant coach(es) Legend: (C) Team captain; (S) Suspended; (I) Ineligible; (W) Walk-on; Injured; Current redshirt

== Schedule and results ==
Date time, TV	Rank^{#}	Opponent^{#}	Result	Record	Site city, state
Regular season
Nov 16, 1997*		SW Missouri State	W 78–67	1–0	Daniel-Meyer Coliseum; Fort Worth, Texas
Nov 22, 1997*		Long Island	W 105–95	2–0	Daniel-Meyer Coliseum; Fort Worth, Texas
Nov 25, 1997*		at Texas Tech	W 107–76	3–0	Lubbock Municipal Coliseum; Lubbock, Texas
Nov 29, 1997*		Texas-Rio Grande Valley	W 153–87	4–0	Daniel-Meyer Coliseum; Fort Worth, Texas
Dec 3, 1997*		Delaware State	W 138–75	5–0	Daniel-Meyer Coliseum; Fort Worth, Texas
Dec 6, 1997*		Morgan State	W 133–74	6–0	Daniel-Meyer Coliseum; Fort Worth, Texas
Dec 9, 1997*		North Texas	W 113–74	7–0	Daniel-Meyer Coliseum; Fort Worth, Texas
Dec 12, 1997*		Mississippi Valley State	W 106–83	8–0	Daniel-Meyer Coliseum; Fort Worth, Texas
Dec 13, 1997*		Baylor	W 99–75	9–0	Daniel-Meyer Coliseum; Fort Worth, Texas
Dec 20, 1997*	No. 24	vs. No. 2 Kansas; Sprint Shootout	L 78–94	9–1	Kemper Arena; Kansas City, Missouri
Dec 24, 1997*	No. 25	vs. Iowa State; Puerto Rico Holiday Classic	W 93–54	10–1	Coliseo Rubén Rodríguez; Bayamón, Puerto Rico
Dec 25, 1997*	No. 25	vs. No. 19 Syracuse; Puerto Rico Holiday Classic	L 78–82	10–2	Coliseo Rubén Rodríguez; Bayamón, Puerto Rico
Dec 26, 1997*	No. 25	at American-Puerto Rico; Puerto Rico Holiday Classic	W 105–93 ^{OT}	11–2	Coliseo Rubén Rodríguez; Bayamón, Puerto Rico
Dec 30, 1997*		Oklahoma State	L 81–82	11–3	Daniel-Meyer Coliseum; Fort Worth, Texas
Jan 5, 1998*		at No. 12 New Mexico	L 77–98	11–4	University Arena; Albuquerque, New Mexico
Jan 8, 1998		Fresno State	W 91–76	12–4 (1–0)	Daniel-Meyer Coliseum; Fort Worth, Texas
Jan 10, 1998		San Jose State	W 104–65	13–4 (2–0)	Daniel-Meyer Coliseum; Fort Worth, Texas
Jan 17, 1998		at San Diego State	W 105–61	14–4 (3–0)	Viejas Arena; San Diego, California
Jan 19, 1998		at No. 24 Hawaii	W 83–76	15–4 (4–0)	Stan Sheriff Center; Honolulu, Hawaii
Jan 26, 1998		SMU	W 100–82	16–4 (5–0)	Daniel-Meyer Coliseum; Fort Worth, Texas
Jan 29, 1998		Rice	W 97–67	17–4 (6–0)	Daniel-Meyer Coliseum; Fort Worth, Texas
Feb 1, 1998		Tulsa	W 102–100 ^{OT}	18–4 (7–0)	Daniel-Meyer Coliseum; Fort Worth, Texas
Feb 5, 1998		at Fresno State	W 99–91	19–4 (8–0)	Selland Arena; Fresno, California
Feb 7, 1998		at San Jose State	W 119–84	20–4 (9–0)	The Event Center; San Jose, California
Feb 12, 1998	No. 22	Hawaii	W 126–84	21–4 (10–0)	Daniel-Meyer Coliseum; Fort Worth, Texas
Feb 14, 1998*	No. 22	San Diego State	W 91–69	22–4 (11–0)	Daniel-Meyer Coliseum; Fort Worth, Texas
Feb 16, 1998	No. 19	at SMU	W 79–70	23–4 (12–0)	Moody Coliseum; Dallas, Texas
Feb 21, 1998*	No. 19	No. 11 New Mexico	W 95–64	24–4	Daniel-Meyer Coliseum; Fort Worth, Texas
Feb 26, 1998	No. 15	at Tulsa	W 57–54	25–4 (13–0)	Tulsa Convention Center; Tulsa, Oklahoma
Feb 28, 1998	No. 15	at Rice	W 86–73	26–4 (14–0)	Tudor Fieldhouse; Houston, Texas
WAC tournament
Mar 5, 1998*	No. 13	vs. SMU; Quarterfinals	W 71–69	27–4	Thomas & Mack Center; Las Vegas, Nevada
Mar 6, 1998*	No. 13	vs. No. 20 New Mexico; Semifinals	L 73–80	27–5	Thomas & Mack Center; Las Vegas, Nevada
NCAA tournament
Mar 13, 1998*	(5 MW) No. 15	vs. (12 MW) Florida State; First Round	L 87–96	27–6	Myriad Convention Center; Oklahoma City, Oklahoma
*Non-conference game. ^{#}Rankings from AP Poll. (#) Tournament seedings in parentheses. MW=Midwest.
