= Corey Santee =

American professional basketball guard (born 1983)

Personal information
- Born: September 13, 1983 (age 43) Flint, Michigan, U.S.
- Listed height: 6 ft 2 in (1.88 m)
- Listed weight: 190 lb (86 kg)

Career information
- High school: Flint Southwestern Academy (Flint, Michigan)
- College: TCU (2001–2005)
- NBA draft: 2005: undrafted
- Playing career: 2005–2012
- Position: Point guard

Career history
- 2005: BK Ventspils
- 2005–2006: Nürnberger Basketball Club
- 2006–2007: Fort Worth Flyers
- 2007: Intercollege Etha
- 2008: Welcoat Dragons
- 2008–2009: Sumykhimprom Sumy
- 2010: Shen Yang Dongjin
- 2012: Rizing Fukuoka

Corey Donya Santee (born September 13, 1983) is an American professional basketball guard.

== High school ==
Santee was a three-year starter at Flint Southwestern Academy. As a senior in 2001, he averaged 20 points and 7 assists per game, leading him to earn first team All-State honors. He also finished as the runner-up for Michigan's "Mr. Basketball" and was rated the number one point guard in the 2001 class in the state of Michigan by Prep Spotlight Magazine.

== College career ==
After high school, Santee was recruited by coach Billy Tubbs to attend Texas Christian University in Fort Worth, Texas. After Santee's freshman year at TCU, Tubbs was replaced by Neil Dougherty, who came to TCU fresh from a trip to the Final Four as an assistant at Kansas.

Santee was named Team MVP and All-Conference USA as both a junior and senior. In his junior season Corey started all 29 games at point guard and played a team-high 33.1 minutes per contest while ranking first on the team in scoring at 14.5 per contest and in assists at 4.4 per game. As a senior in 2005, he led his team with 14 ppg, 3 rpg, 4 assists. He scored a season high 26 points against Texas A&M-Corpus Christi. He towed the Horned Frogs to the quarterfinal round of the NIT. Corey Santee started 61 straight games for TCU and ended his college career as the all-time assists leader and also had 1,832 points, good for second on the school's all-time scoring list.

== Professional career ==
Santee was on many NBA teams’ draft board but he went undrafted in the 2005 NBA draft. His first overseas experience was in Latvia with BK Ventspils, but it lasted only few weeks. Right afterwards he played professional basketball in Germany for the Sellbytel Baskets Nürnberg for a year before returning to play for the Fort Worth Flyers, playing both guard spots. He put up in 12.2 points, 1.5 assists and 1.0 steal a game in the 2006-2007 NBDL season and also ranked in the top five for three pointer made.

He played in Ukraine for Sumykhimprom Sumy.
