= Dick O'Neal =

American basketball player

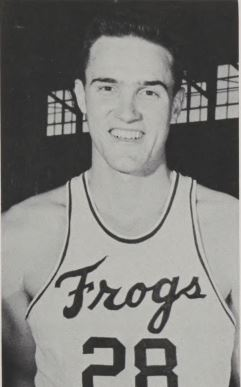
- O'Neal during his senior year at TCU.

Personal information
- Born: September 7, 1935 Dallas, Texas
- Died: September 17, 2013 (aged 78) Parker County, Texas
- Listed height: 6 ft 7 in (2.01 m)
- Listed weight: 215 lb (98 kg)

Career information
- High school: Polytechnic (Fort Worth, Texas)
- College: TCU (1954–1957)
- NBA draft: 1957: 2nd round, 16th overall pick
- Drafted by: Boston Celtics
- Position: Power forward / center
- Number: 28

Career highlights
- Third-team All-American – NABC (1957); 3× First-team All-SWC (1955–1957); No. 28 Jersey retired by TCU Horned Frogs
- Stats at Basketball Reference

Richard O'Neal (September 7, 1935 – September 17, 2013) was an American basketball player. He was an All-American college player at Texas Christian University (TCU) and a second round draft pick of the Boston Celtics in the 1957 NBA draft.

O'Neal was born in Dallas, Texas and starred at Polytechnic High School in Fort Worth. For college, the 6'7" forward/center chose nearby TCU. O'Neal would become one of the Horned Frogs' all-time greats as he scored 1,723 points (23.9 per game) and captured 790 rebounds (11.0 per game) in his three-year career from 1954 to 1957. During his time, he was named first team All-Southwest Conference all three seasons and received national recognition as an All-American each year as well (honorable mention as a sophomore and junior and third team honors as a senior).

Following his college career, O'Neal was drafted by the Boston Celtics in the second round of 1957 NBA draft (16th pick overall). However, he never played in the league, instead opting for dental school at Baylor University and a long career in the private sector as a dentist, orthodontist and school administrator.

O'Neal was inducted into the Texas Sports Hall of Fame in 1985. In 2010, he became the first player in TCU basketball history to have his jersey honored by the school.

Dick O'Neal died in his sleep on September 17, 2013.
