= 1997 Maui Invitational =

1997 Maui Invitational Tournament
- Season: 1997–98
- Teams: 8
- Finals site: Lahaina Civic Center; Maui, Hawaii
- Champions: Duke (2nd title)
- Runner-up: Arizona (2nd title game)
- Semifinalists: Kentucky; Missouri
- Winning coach: Mike Krzyzewski (2nd title)
- MVP: Steve Wojciechowski (Duke)

The 1997 Maui Invitational Tournament was an early-season college basketball tournament that was played, for the 14th time, from November 24 to November 26, 1997. The tournament, which began in 1984, was part of the 1997-98 NCAA Division I men's basketball season. The tournament was played at the Lahaina Civic Center in Maui, Hawaii and was won by the Duke Blue Devils. It was the second title for both the program and for its head coach Mike Krzyzewski.

== Bracket ==
5th place game November 26
DePaul	46
George Washington	60
7th place game
Chaminade	72
Boston College	81

Consolation 2nd Round; November 25
Chaminade	55
DePaul	57
George Washington	76
Boston College	64

First Round; November 24
Chaminade	70
3	Duke	96
DePaul	42
Missouri	45
8	Kentucky	70
George Washington	55
1	Arizona	99
Boston College	69

Semifinals; November 25
3	Duke	82
Missouri	59
8	Kentucky	79
1	Arizona	89

Championship; November 26
3	Duke	95
1	Arizona	87
3rd place game
Missouri	55
8	Kentucky	77
