= 1997–98 Washington Huskies men's basketball team =

American college basketball season

1997–98 Washington Huskies men's basketball

NCAA tournament, Sweet Sixteen
- Conference: Pacific-10 Conference

Ranking
- Coaches: No. 24
- Record: 20–10 (11–7 Pac-10)
- Head coach: Bob Bender (5th season)
- Home arena: Hec Edmundson Pavilion

1997–98 Pacific-10 Conference men's basketball standings
	Conf.				Overall
Team	W		L	PCT	W		L	PCT
No. 4 Arizona	17	–	1	.944	30	–	5	.857
No. 10 Stanford	15	–	3	.833	30	–	5	.857
No. 19 UCLA	12	–	6	.667	24	–	9	.727
Washington	11	–	7	.611	20	–	10	.667
Arizona State	8	–	10	.444	18	–	14	.563
Oregon	8	–	10	.444	13	–	14	.481
California	8	–	10	.444	12	–	15	.444
USC	5	–	13	.278	9	–	19	.321
Oregon State	3	–	15	.167	13	–	17	.433
Washington State	3	–	15	.167	10	–	19	.345
As of November 23, 2011; Rankings from AP Poll

The 1997–98 Washington Huskies men's basketball team represented the University of Washington for the 1997–98 NCAA Division I men's basketball season. Led by fifth-year head coach Bob Bender, the Huskies were members of the Pacific-10 Conference and played their home games on campus at Hec Edmundson Pavilion in Seattle, Washington.

The Huskies were 18–9 overall in the regular season and 11–7 in conference play, fourth in the standings. There was no conference tournament this season; last played in 1990, it resumed in 2002.

Washington returned to the NCAA tournament for the first time in twelve years and won for the first time since 1984. Seeded eleventh in the East regional, they upset Xavier by a point in the first round, and handled fourteen seed Richmond in the second round.

In the Sweet Sixteen, Washington nearly upset second seed Connecticut; a rebound jumper at the buzzer by Richard Hamilton allowed UConn to escape with a one-point win.

== Postseason results ==
Date time, TV	Rank^{#}	Opponent^{#}	Result	Record	Site (attendance) city, state
NCAA tournament
Thu, March 12*; 9:20 am, CBS	(11 E)	vs. (6 E) No. 23 Xavier; First round	W 69–68	19–9	MCI Center (19,288); Washington, D.C.
Sat, March 14*; 1:38 pm, CBS	(11 E)	vs. (14 E) (14E) Richmond; Second round	W 81–66	20–9	MCI Center (19,320); Washington, D.C.
Thu, March 19*; 6:50 pm, CBS	(11 E)	vs. (2 E) No. 6 (2E) Connecticut; Sweet Sixteen	L 74–75	20–10	Greensboro Coliseum (23,235); Greensboro, North Carolina
*Non-conference game. ^{#}Rankings from AP poll. (#) Tournament seedings in parentheses. E=East. All times are in Pacific time.
