= 1997–98 UMass Minutemen basketball team =

American college basketball season

1997–98 UMass Minutemen men's basketball
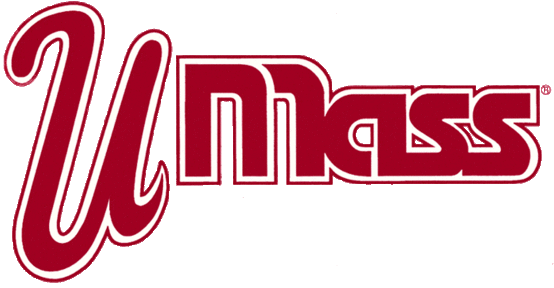

NCAA Tournament, Round of 64
- Conference: Atlantic 10 Conference
- Record: 21–11 (12–4 A-10)
- Head coach: Bruiser Flint (2nd season)
- Assistant coaches: Geoff Arnold; Tony Barbee; John Robic
- Home arena: William D. Mullins Memorial Center

1997–98 Atlantic 10 men's basketball standings
| | Conf. | | | | Overall |
| Team | W | | L | PCT | W | | L | PCT |
|---|---|---|---|---|---|---|---|---|
East
| No. 24 Temple | 13 | – | 3 | .813 | 21 | – | 9 | .700 |
| Rhode Island | 12 | – | 4 | .750 | 25 | – | 9 | .735 |
| UMass | 12 | – | 4 | .750 | 21 | – | 11 | .656 |
| St. Bonaventure | 6 | – | 10 | .375 | 17 | – | 15 | .531 |
| Saint Joseph's | 3 | – | 13 | .188 | 11 | – | 17 | .393 |
| Fordham | 2 | – | 14 | .125 | 6 | – | 21 | .222 |
West
| No. 23 Xavier † | 11 | – | 5 | .688 | 22 | – | 8 | .733 |
| George Washington | 11 | – | 5 | .688 | 24 | – | 9 | .727 |
| Dayton | 11 | – | 5 | .688 | 21 | – | 12 | .636 |
| Virginia Tech | 5 | – | 11 | .313 | 10 | – | 17 | .370 |
| Duquesne | 5 | – | 11 | .313 | 11 | – | 19 | .367 |
| La Salle | 5 | – | 11 | .313 | 9 | – | 18 | .333 |
† 1998 Atlantic 10 Tournament winner Rankings from AP Poll

The 1997–98 UMass Minutemen basketball team represented the University of Massachusetts Amherst during the 1997–98 NCAA Division I men's basketball season. The Minutemen, led by second year head coach Bruiser Flint, played their home games at William D. Mullins Memorial Center and are members of the Atlantic 10 Conference. They finished the season 21–11, 12–4 in A-10 play to finish in third place.

UMass lost to Saint Louis in the first round of the NCAA tournament.

== Roster ==
| Number | Name | Position | Height | Weight | Year | Hometown |
|---|---|---|---|---|---|---|
| 3 | Charlton Clarke | Guard | 6–3 | 215 | Junior | Bronx, New York |
| 4 | Lari Ketner | Center | 6–10 | 268 | Junior | Philadelphia, Pennsylvania |
| 5 | Monty Mack | Guard | 6–3 | 193 | Sophomore | South Boston, Massachusetts |
| 10 | Jonathan DePina | Guard | 5–9 | 175 | Freshman | South Boston, Massachusetts |
| 12 | Ross Burns | Guard | 6–3 | 180 | Junior | Greenfield, Massachusetts |
| 13 | Rafael Cruz | Guard | 6–2 | 185 | Freshman | Arecibo, Puerto Rico |
| 14 | Andy Maclay | Guard | 6–4 | 195 | Junior | Stroudsburg, Pennsylvania |
| 20 | Winston Smith | Forward | 6–5 | 218 | Sophomore | Summit, New Jersey |
| 22 | Chris Kirkland | Forward | 6–6 | 206 | Sophomore | Pittsburgh, Pennsylvania |
| 23 | Mike Babul | Forward | 6–6 | 204 | Sophomore | North Attleboro, Massachusetts |
| 25 | Ronnell Blizzard | Forward | 6–8 | 218 | Freshman | Waterbury, Connecticut |
| 34 | Tyrone Weeks | Forward | 6–7 | 258 | Senior | Philadelphia, PA |
| 40 | Ajmal Basit | Center/Forward | 6–9 | 248 | Sophomore | Brooklyn, New York |

== Schedule ==
| Date time, TV | Rank^{#} | Opponent^{#} | Result | Record | Site (attendance) city, state |
Regular Season
| 11/22/1997* | | at No. 13 Fresno State | L 64–82 | 0–1 | Selland Arena (10,220); Fresno, California |
| 11/26/1997* | | vs. SW Louisiana; Great Alaska Shootout | W 80–64 | 1–1 | Sullivan Arena (–); Anchorage, Alaska |
| 11/28/1997* | | vs. No. 6 Purdue; Great Alaska Shootout | L 69–82 | 1–2 | Sullivan Arena (8,700); Anchorage, Alaska |
| 11/29/1997* | | vs. Seton Hall; Great Alaska Shootout | W 73–60 | 2–2 | Sullivan Arena (8,700); Anchorage, Alaska |
| 12/02/1997* | | College of Charleston | W 52–40 | 3–2 | Mullins Center (7,536); Amherst, Massachusetts |
| 12/06/1997* | | Marshall | W 61–59 | 4–2 | Mullins Center (7,107); Amherst, MA |
| 12/10/1997* | | at No. 3 Kansas | L 71–73 | 4–3 | Allen Fieldhouse (16,300); Lawrence, Kansas |
| 12/14/1997* | | vs. Boston College; Commonwealth Classic | W 65–57 | 5–3 | Fleet Center (9,218); Boston, Massachusetts |
| 12/20/1997* | | vs. Colorado; Las Vegas Shootout | W 79–68 | 6–3 | Thomas & Mack Center (5,000); Las Vegas, Nevada |
| 12/23/1997* | | at No. 11 Connecticut; U-Game | L 55–72 | 6–4 | Hartford Civic Center (10,797); Hartford, Connecticut |
| 12/27/1997* | | vs. Cincinnati; Gatorade Rock 'n Roll Shootout | L 66–74 ^{OT} | 6–5 | Gund Arena (12,324); Cleveland, Ohio |
| 01/3/1998 | | at Saint Joseph's | W 72–66 | 7–5 (1–0) | Alumni Memorial Fieldhouse (3,200); Philadelphia, Pennsylvania |
| 01/06/1998 | | at Fordham | W 73–55 | 8–5 (2–0) | Rose Hill Gymnasium (2,217); The Bronx, New York |
| 01/10/1998 | | George Washington | W 79–48 | 9–5 (3–0) | Mullins Center (9,493); Amherst, MA |
| 01/15/1998* | | vs. Charlotte; A-10/Conference USA Challenge | W 68–62 ^{OT} | 10–5 | Providence Civic Center (3,925); Providence, Rhode Island |
| 01/17/1997 | | Fordham | W 62–46 | 11–5 (4–0) | Mullins Center (7,110); Amherst, MA |
| 01/19/1998 | | St. Bonaventure | W 62–50 | 12–5 (5–0) | Mullins Center (7,363); Amherst, MA |
| 01/22/1998* | | at Davidson | W 82–66 | 13–5 | Belk Arena (4,417); Davidson, North Carolina |
| 01/24/1998 | | at Virginia Tech | W 68–59 | 14–5 (6–0) | Cassell Coliseum (7,811); Blacksburg, Virginia |
| 01/29/1998 | | at No. 21 Rhode Island | W 74–57 | 15–5 (7–0) | Providence Civic Center (12,412); Providence, RI |
| 02/01/1998 | | Dayton | W 85–69 | 16–5 (8–0) | Mullins Center (9,493); Amherst, MA |
| 02/03/1998 | No. 23 | Temple | L 47–61 | 16–6 (8–1) | Mullins Center (9,493); Amherst, MA |
| 02/08/1998 | No. 23 | at No. 21 Xavier | W 73–62 | 17–6 (9–1) | Cincinnati Gardens (10,100); Cincinnati, Ohio |
| 02/10/1998 | No. 20 | at Duquesne | W 74–68 | 18–6 (10–1) | Palumbo Center (5,507); Pittsburgh, Pennsylvania |
| 02/14/1998 | No. 20 | La Salle | W 81–71 | 19–6 (11–1) | Mullins Center (8,412); Amherst, MA |
| 02/18/1998 | No. 18 | Rhode Island | W 85–77 ^{2OT} | 19–7 (11–2) | Mullins Center (9,493); Amherst, MA |
| 02/21/1998 | No. 18 | Saint Joseph's | W 82–79 ^{OT} | 20–7 (12–2) | Mullins Center (9,493); Amherst, MA |
| 02/25/1998 | No. 20 | St. Bonaventure | L 70–72 ^{2OT} | 20–8 (12–3) | Reilly Center (6,000); Olean, New York |
| 03/01/1998 | No. 20 | at No. 24 Temple | L 66–74 | 20–9 (12–4) | Apollo of Temple (10,021); Philadelphia, PA |
1998 Atlantic 10 men's basketball tournament
| 03/04/1998 | (E3) | vs. (W6) Virginia Tech; 1st Round | W 64–58 | 21–9 | CoreStates Spectrum (6,204); Philadelphia, PA |
| 03/05/1998 | (E3) | vs. (W2) George Washington; Quarterfinal | L 83–88 | 21–10 | CoreStates Spectrum (7,545); Philadelphia, PA |
1998 NCAA Division I men's basketball tournament
| 03/13/1998* | (7 SE) | vs. (10 SE) Saint Louis; First Round | L 46–51 | 21–11 | Georgia Dome (17,474); Atlanta, Georgia |
*Non-conference game. ^{#}Rankings from AP Poll. (#) Tournament seedings in parentheses. All times are in Eastern Time.
