= 1998 Atlantic 10 men's basketball tournament =

- Classification: Division I
- Season: 1997–98
- Teams: 12
- Site: CoreStates Spectrum; Philadelphia
- Champions: Xavier (1st title)
- Winning coach: Skip Prosser (1st title)
- MVP: James Posey (Xavier)

1997–98 Atlantic 10 men's basketball standings
	Conf.				Overall
Team	W		L	PCT	W		L	PCT
East
No. 24 Temple	13	–	3	.813	21	–	9	.700
Rhode Island	12	–	4	.750	25	–	9	.735
UMass	12	–	4	.750	21	–	11	.656
St. Bonaventure	6	–	10	.375	17	–	15	.531
Saint Joseph's	3	–	13	.188	11	–	17	.393
Fordham	2	–	14	.125	6	–	21	.222
West
No. 23 Xavier †	11	–	5	.688	22	–	8	.733
George Washington	11	–	5	.688	24	–	9	.727
Dayton	11	–	5	.688	21	–	12	.636
Virginia Tech	5	–	11	.313	10	–	17	.370
Duquesne	5	–	11	.313	11	–	19	.367
La Salle	5	–	11	.313	9	–	18	.333
† 1998 Atlantic 10 Tournament winner Rankings from AP Poll

The 1998 Atlantic 10 Men's Basketball Tournament was played from March 4 to March 7, 1998 at the CoreStates Spectrum in Philadelphia, Pennsylvania. The winner was named champion of the Atlantic 10 Conference and received an automatic bid to the 1998 NCAA Men's Division I Basketball Tournament. Xavier University won the tournament.

== Background ==
UMass, Rhode Island, Temple, and George Washington also received bids to the NCAA Tournament. James Posey of Xavier was named the tournament's Most Outstanding Player. Including Posey, 4 of the 5 players on the All-Championship Team were from Xavier. Joining Posey were Torraye Braggs, Lenny Brown and Darnell Williams of Xavier, and Shawnta Rogers of George Washington. Posey and Braggs would eventually play in the NBA, while Rogers would also play professionally. The top two teams in each division received a first-round bye.

== Bracket ==
First round Wednesday, March 4
W4	La Salle	72
E5	Saint Joseph's	73
E3	UMass	64
W6	Virginia Tech	58
E4	St. Bonaventure	75
W5	Duquesne	62
W3	Dayton	68
E6	Fordham	60

Quarterfinals; Thursday, March 5
E1	#24 Temple	76
E5	Saint Joseph's	52
W2	George Washington	88
E3	UMass	83
W1	Xavier	68
E4	St. Bonaventure	44
E2	Rhode Island	83
W3	Dayton	70

Semifinals; Friday, March 6
E1	#24 Temple	64
W2	George Washington	78
W1	Xavier	95
E2	Rhode Island	80

Final; Saturday, March 7
W2	George Washington	63
W1	Xavier	77

All games played at The Spectrum, Philadelphia, Pennsylvania
