= 1997–98 UCLA Bruins men's basketball team =

American college basketball season

1997–98 UCLA Bruins men's basketball

NCAA tournament, Sweet Sixteen
- Conference: Pacific-10

Ranking
- Coaches: No. 12
- AP: No. 19
- Record: 24–9 (12–6 Pac-10)
- Head coach: Steve Lavin (2nd season)
- Assistant coaches: Michael Holton; Jim Saia; Steve Spencer
- Home arena: Pauley Pavilion

1997–98 Pacific-10 Conference men's basketball standings
	Conf.				Overall
Team	W		L	PCT	W		L	PCT
No. 4 Arizona	17	–	1	.944	30	–	5	.857
No. 10 Stanford	15	–	3	.833	30	–	5	.857
No. 19 UCLA	12	–	6	.667	24	–	9	.727
Washington	11	–	7	.611	20	–	10	.667
Arizona State	8	–	10	.444	18	–	14	.563
Oregon	8	–	10	.444	13	–	14	.481
California	8	–	10	.444	12	–	15	.444
USC	5	–	13	.278	9	–	19	.321
Oregon State	3	–	15	.167	13	–	17	.433
Washington State	3	–	15	.167	10	–	19	.345
As of November 23, 2011; Rankings from AP Poll

The 1997–98 UCLA Bruins men's basketball team represented the University of California, Los Angeles in the 1997–98 NCAA Division I men's basketball season. The team finished 3rd in the conference. The Bruins competed in the 1998 NCAA Division I men's basketball tournament, losing to the Kentucky Wildcats in the sweet sixteen. This was the second season for head coach Steve Lavin. Seniors Toby Bailey, J.R. Henderson, and Kris Johnson were honored as the team's co-Most Valuable Players. Johnson led UCLA in scoring with an 18.4 average, 21.1 in Pac-10 play. Baron Davis was the prize recruit of the incoming freshman class. Fellow Los Angeles prep star Schea Cotton had also committed to UCLA, but the NCAA invalidated his SAT scores, and he was not allowed to enroll.

== Roster ==
1997–98 UCLA Bruins men's basketball team
Players
Coaches

Pos.	#	Name	Height	Weight	Year	Hometown
G	12	Toby Bailey (C)	6 ft 5 in (1.96 m)	—	Sr	Los Angeles, California
F	4	Kevin Daley	—	—		Panama City, Panama
G	5	Baron Davis	6 ft 2 in (1.88 m)	—	Fr	Los Angeles, California
F	30	Sean Farnham	6 ft 6 in (1.98 m)	—	So
G	15	Matt Harbour	—	—
F	52	J.R. Henderson (C)	6 ft 9 in (2.06 m)	—	Sr	Bakersfield, California
G	22	Rico Hines	6 ft 4 in (1.93 m)	—	Fr	Greenville, North Carolina
G	54	Kris Johnson	6 ft 4 in (1.93 m)	—	Sr	Los Angeles, California
G/F	3	Billy Knight	—	—
G	20	Brandon Loyd	—	—
C	34	Jelani McCoy	6 ft 9 in (2.06 m)	—	Jr	Oakland, California
G	30	Vince McGautha	—	—
F	13	Travis Reed	6 ft 7 in (2.01 m)	—	Fr	Los Angeles, California
G	25	Earl Watson	6 ft 0 in (1.83 m)	—	Fr	Kansas City, Kansas

Head coach

Steve Lavin (Chapman)

Assistant coach(es)

- Michael Holton (UCLA)
- Jim Saia (Chapman)
- Steve Spencer (Somona State)

Legend

- (C) Team captain
- (S) Suspended
- (I) Ineligible
- (W) Walk-on
- Injured
- Current redshirt

Roster
Last update: 30 January 2018

== Schedule ==
Date time, TV	Rank^{#}	Opponent^{#}	Result	Record	Site city, state
Exhibition
November 13, 1997		vs. Silute (Lithuania); Exhibition	W 92–80	0–0	Pauley Pavilion; Los Angeles, CA
November 19, 1997		vs. NBC Thunder; Exhibition	W 76–74	0–0	Pauley Pavilion; Los Angeles, CA
Regular Season
November 27, 1997; ESPN	No. 7	vs. No. 4 North Carolina; Great Alaska Shootout First Round	L 68–109	0–1	Sullivan Arena (8,700); Anchorage, AK
November 28, 1997	No. 7	at Alaska Anchorage; Consolation 2nd Round	W 92–68	1–1	Sullivan Arena (8,700); Anchorage, AK
November 29, 1997	No. 7	vs. UAB; Fifth Place Game	W 86–72	2–1	Sullivan Arena (8,700); Anchorage, AK
December 6, 1997; FSN	No. 15	vs. No. 8 New Mexico; John R. Wooden Classic	W 69–58	3–1	Arrowhead Pond of Anaheim (14,274); Anaheim, CA
December 13, 1997; FSW2	No. 12	Cal State Fullerton	W 120–91	4–1	Pauley Pavilion (9,724); Los Angeles, CA
December 18, 1997; FSW2	No. 11	Northern Arizona	W 90–68	5–1	Pauley Pavilion (7,488); Los Angeles, CA
December 20, 1997; FSW2	No. 11	Saint Louis	W 73–67	6–1	Pauley Pavilion (9,998); Los Angeles, CA
December 22, 1997; FSW2	No. 11	Boise State	W 81–75	7–1	Pauley Pavilion (8,500); Los Angeles, CA
December 27, 1997; ESPN	No. 9	at UNLV	W 65–57	8–1	Thomas & Mack Center (17,490); Paradise, NV
December 30, 1997; FSN	No. 9	Illinois	W 74–69	9–1	Pauley Pavilion (12,055); Los Angeles, CA
January 3, 1998; FX	No. 9	at No. 8 Arizona	L 75–87	9–2 (0–1)	McKale Center (14,551); Tucson, AZ
January 5, 1998	No. 9	at Arizona State	W 78–73	10–2 (1–1)	Wells Fargo Arena (8,075); Tempe, AZ
January 8, 1998; FSW2	No. 10	Oregon State	W 90–72	11–2 (2–1)	Pauley Pavilion (9,614); Los Angeles, CA
January 10, 1998; FX	No. 10	Oregon	W 68–66	12–2 (3–1)	Pauley Pavilion (11,713); Los Angeles, CA
January 15, 1998; FSN	No. 8	at California	W 74–73	13–2 (4–1)	Oakland Arena (10,927); Oakland, CA
January 17, 1998; CBS	No. 8	at No. 7 Stanford	L 80–93	13–3 (4–2)	Maples Pavilion (7,510); Stanford, CA
January 21, 1998; FSW2	No. 9	USC	W 101–84	14–3 (5–2)	Pauley Pavilion (12,327); Los Angeles, CA
January 25, 1998; CBS	No. 9	Louisville	W 88–82	15–3	Pauley Pavilion (10,059); Los Angeles, CA
January 29, 1998; FSW2	No. 8	Washington State	W 88–68	16–3 (6–2)	Pauley Pavilion (10,024); Los Angeles, CA
January 31, 1998; ABC	No. 8	Washington	W 105–94	17–3 (7–2)	Pauley Pavilion (11,242); Los Angeles, CA
February 5, 1998; FSN	No. 6	at Oregon	L 81–97	17–4 (7–3)	McArthur Court (9,087); Eugene, OR
February 7, 1998; ABC	No. 6	at Oregon State	W 84–75	18–4 (8–3)	Gill Coliseum (10,400); Corvallis, OR
February 12, 1998; FSN	No. 9	No. 14 Stanford	L 81–84	18–5 (8–4)	Pauley Pavilion (13,079); Los Angeles, CA
February 14, 1998; ABC	No. 9	California	W 87–84	19–5 (9–4)	Pauley Pavilion (11,497); Los Angeles, CA
February 18, 1998; FSW2	No. 12	at USC	W 82–75 ^{OT}	20–5 (10–4)	Los Angeles Memorial Sports Arena (7,167); Los Angeles, CA
February 22, 1998; ABC	No. 12	at No. 2 Duke	L 84–120	20–6	Cameron Indoor Stadium (9,314); Durham, NC
February 26, 1998	No. 18	at Washington State	W 78–75	21–6 (11–4)	Beasley Coliseum (4,816); Corvallis, OR
March 01, 1998; CBS	No. 18	at Washington	L 94–95	21–7 (11–5)	Hec Edmundson Pavilion (6,527); Seattle, WA
March 05, 1998; FSW2	No. 19	Arizona State	W 102–94	22–7 (12–5)	Pauley Pavilion (10,970); Los Angeles, CA
March 07, 1998; FSN	No. 19	No. 2 Arizona	L 87–91	22–8 (12–6)	Pauley Pavilion (12,799); Los Angeles, CA
NCAA tournament
March 13, 1998; CBS	No. 19	vs. Miami; First Round	W 65–62	23–8	Georgia Dome (17,818); Atlanta, GA
March 15, 1998; CBS	No. 19	vs. No. 12 Michigan; Second Round	W 85–82	24–8	Georgia Dome (19,423); Atlanta, GA
March 20, 1998; CBS	No. 19	vs. No. 5 Kentucky; Sweet Sixteen	L 68–94	24–9	Tropicana Field (40,589); St. Petersburg, FL
*Non-conference game. ^{#}Rankings from AP Poll. (#) Tournament seedings in parentheses. All times are in Pacific Time.
