= 1998 CAA men's basketball tournament =

- Classification: Division I
- Season: 1997–98
- Teams: 9
- Site: Richmond Coliseum; Richmond, Virginia
- Champions: Richmond (5th title)
- Winning coach: John Beilein (1st title)
- MVP: Daryl Oliver (Richmond)
- Television: ESPN

1997–98 CAA men's basketball standings
| | Conf. | | | | Overall |
| Team | W | | L | PCT | W | | L | PCT |
|---|---|---|---|---|---|---|---|---|
| UNC Wilmington | 13 | – | 3 | .813 | 20 | – | 11 | .645 |
| William & Mary | 13 | – | 3 | .813 | 20 | – | 7 | .741 |
| Richmond † | 12 | – | 4 | .750 | 23 | – | 8 | .742 |
| Old Dominion | 8 | – | 8 | .500 | 12 | – | 16 | .429 |
| James Madison | 6 | – | 10 | .375 | 11 | – | 16 | .407 |
| George Mason | 6 | – | 10 | .375 | 9 | – | 18 | .333 |
| American | 5 | – | 11 | .313 | 9 | – | 19 | .321 |
| East Carolina | 5 | – | 11 | .313 | 10 | – | 17 | .370 |
| VCU | 4 | – | 12 | .250 | 9 | – | 19 | .321 |
† 1998 CAA tournament winner Rankings from AP Poll

The 1998 CAA men's basketball tournament was held February 26 to March 1, 1998, at the Richmond Coliseum in Richmond, Virginia. The winner of the tournament was Richmond, who received an automatic bid to the 1998 NCAA Men's Division I Basketball Tournament.

== Bracket ==
First round Friday, February 26
8 | East Carolina | 62
9 | VCU | 65

Quarterfinals; Saturday, February 27
1 | UNC Wilmington | 69
9 | VCU | 63
4 | Old Dominion | 60
5 | James Madison | 56
2 | William & Mary | 66
7 | American | 71
3 | Richmond | 66
6 | George Mason | 49

Semifinals; Sunday, February 28
1 | UNC Wilmington | 54
4 | Old Dominion | 51
7 | American | 64
3 | Richmond | 66

Final; Monday, March 1
1 | UNC Wilmington | 64
3 | Richmond | 79

== Honors ==
| CAA All-Tournament Team | Player | School |
|---|---|---|
| CAA All-Tournament Team | Daryl Oliver | Richmond |
| CAA All-Tournament Team | Jonathan Baker | Richmond |
| CAA All-Tournament Team | Marseilles Brown | Richmond |
| CAA All-Tournament Team | Eric Poole | Richmond |
| CAA All-Tournament Team | Stan Simmons | UNC-Wilmington |
| CAA All-Tournament Team | Jarod Stevenson | Richmond |
