= 1997–98 Washington State Cougars men's basketball team =

American college basketball season

1997–98 Washington State Cougars men's basketball
- Conference: Pacific-10 Conference
- Record: 10–19 (3–15 Pac-10)
- Head coach: Kevin Eastman (4th season)
- Home arena: Beasley Coliseum

1997–98 Pacific-10 Conference men's basketball standings
	Conf.				Overall
Team	W		L	PCT	W		L	PCT
No. 4 Arizona	17	–	1	.944	30	–	5	.857
No. 10 Stanford	15	–	3	.833	30	–	5	.857
No. 19 UCLA	12	–	6	.667	24	–	9	.727
Washington	11	–	7	.611	20	–	10	.667
Arizona State	8	–	10	.444	18	–	14	.563
Oregon	8	–	10	.444	13	–	14	.481
California	8	–	10	.444	12	–	15	.444
USC	5	–	13	.278	9	–	19	.321
Oregon State	3	–	15	.167	13	–	17	.433
Washington State	3	–	15	.167	10	–	19	.345
As of November 23, 2011; Rankings from AP Poll

The 1997–98 Washington State Cougars men's basketball team represented Washington State University for the 1997–98 NCAA Division I men's basketball season. Led by fourth-year head coach Kevin Eastman, the Cougars were members of the Pacific-10 Conference and played their home games on campus at Beasley Coliseum in Pullman, Washington.

The Cougars were 10–19 overall in the regular season and 3–15 in conference play, tied for last in the standings.

There was no conference tournament this season; last played in 1990, it resumed in 2002.
