= 1997–98 Temple Owls men's basketball team =

American college basketball season

1997–98 Temple Owls men's basketball

Atlantic 10 Regular season champions

NCAA tournament, First Round
- Conference: Atlantic 10 Conference

Ranking
- AP: No. 24
- Record: 21–9 (13–3 A–10)
- Head coach: John Chaney (16th season)
- Assistant coach: Dan Leibovitz (2nd season)
- Home arena: The Apollo of Temple

1997–98 Atlantic 10 men's basketball standings
| | Conf. | | | | Overall |
| Team | W | | L | PCT | W | | L | PCT |
|---|---|---|---|---|---|---|---|---|
East
| No. 24 Temple | 13 | – | 3 | .813 | 21 | – | 9 | .700 |
| Rhode Island | 12 | – | 4 | .750 | 25 | – | 9 | .735 |
| UMass | 12 | – | 4 | .750 | 21 | – | 11 | .656 |
| St. Bonaventure | 6 | – | 10 | .375 | 17 | – | 15 | .531 |
| Saint Joseph's | 3 | – | 13 | .188 | 11 | – | 17 | .393 |
| Fordham | 2 | – | 14 | .125 | 6 | – | 21 | .222 |
West
| No. 23 Xavier † | 11 | – | 5 | .688 | 22 | – | 8 | .733 |
| George Washington | 11 | – | 5 | .688 | 24 | – | 9 | .727 |
| Dayton | 11 | – | 5 | .688 | 21 | – | 12 | .636 |
| Virginia Tech | 5 | – | 11 | .313 | 10 | – | 17 | .370 |
| Duquesne | 5 | – | 11 | .313 | 11 | – | 19 | .367 |
| La Salle | 5 | – | 11 | .313 | 9 | – | 18 | .333 |
† 1998 Atlantic 10 Tournament winner Rankings from AP Poll

The 1997–98 Temple Owls men's basketball team represented Temple University as a member of the Atlantic 10 Conference during the 1997–98 NCAA Division I men's basketball season. The team was led by head coach John Chaney and played their home games at the newly opened Liacouras Center in Philadelphia, Pennsylvania. The Owls won the Atlantic 10 regular season title, but fell in the semifinals of the Atlantic 10 Tournament. The team received an at-large bid to the NCAA tournament as No. 7 seed in the West region. Temple lost to No. 10 seed West Virginia, 82–52, in the opening round. Temple finished with a record of 21–9 (13–3 A-10).

== Roster ==
1997–98 Temple Owls men's basketball team
Players
Coaches

| Pos. | # | Name | Height | Weight | Year | Hometown |
|---|---|---|---|---|---|---|
| G | 4 | Pepe Sánchez | 6 ft 4 in (1.93 m) | — | So | Bahía Blanca, Argentina |
| G | 14 | Lynn Greer | 6 ft 1 in (1.85 m) | 175 lb (79 kg) | Fr | Philadelphia, Pennsylvania |
| G | 21 | Rasheed Brokenborough | 6 ft 3 in (1.91 m) | 195 lb (88 kg) | Jr | Philadelphia, Pennsylvania |
| F/C | 25 | Marc Jackson | 6 ft 10 in (2.08 m) | 260 lb (118 kg) | Sr | Philadelphia, Pennsylvania |
| F/C | 32 | Lamont Barnes | 6 ft 10 in (2.08 m) | 230 lb (104 kg) | So | Hopkinsville, Kentucky |
| G | 33 | Quincy Wadley | 6 ft 4 in (1.93 m) | 195 lb (88 kg) | Fr | Harrisburg, Pennsylvania |
| F | | Keaton Sanders | 6 ft 6 in (1.98 m) | — | So |
| F | | Damien Read | 6 ft 6 in (1.98 m) | — | Sr |

Head coach

- John Chaney

Assistant coach(es)

Legend

- (C) Team captain
- (S) Suspended
- (I) Ineligible
- (W) Walk-on
- Injured
- Current redshirt

Roster

== Schedule and results ==
| Date time, TV | Rank^{#} | Opponent^{#} | Result | Record | Site city, state |
Regular Season
| Nov 11, 1997* | | vs. Auburn; NABC Classic | W 68–42 | 1–0 | University Arena (17,112); Albuquerque, New Mexico |
| Nov 14, 1997* | | No. 17 Indiana | W 59–53 | 2–0 | CoreStates Center; Philadelphia, Pennsylvania |
| Nov 22, 1997* | | at No. 21 Ole Miss | L 74–87 | 2–1 | Tad Smith Coliseum; Oxford, Mississippi |
| Dec 4, 1997* | | at Michigan State | W 56–54 | 3–1 | Breslin Student Events Center; East Lansing, Michigan |
| Dec 6, 1997* | | at Wisconsin | W 59–49 | 4–1 | Wisconsin Field House; Madison, Wisconsin |
| Dec 9, 1997* | | No. 18 Fresno State | W 76–61 | 5–1 | The Apollo of Temple; Philadelphia, Pennsylvania |
| Dec 13, 1997* | | DePaul | W 74–43 | 6–1 | The Apollo of Temple; Philadelphia, Pennsylvania |
| Dec 16, 1997* | | at Villanova | L 57–68 | 6–2 | CoreStates Center; Philadelphia, Pennsylvania |
Atlantic 10 Tournament
| Mar 5, 1998* | | vs. Saint Joseph's; Quarterfinals | W 76–52 | 21–7 | CoreStates Spectrum; Philadelphia, Pennsylvania |
| Mar 6, 1998* | | George Washington; Semifinals | L 64–78 | 21–8 | CoreStates Spectrum; Philadelphia, Pennsylvania |
NCAA Tournament
| Mar 12, 1998* | (7 W) No. 24 | vs. (10 W) West Virginia; First Round | L 52–82 | 21–9 | BSU Pavilion; Boise, Idaho |
*Non-conference game. ^{#}Rankings from AP Poll. (#) Tournament seedings in parentheses. W=West. All times are in Eastern Standard Time.
