= 1997–98 Rhode Island Rams men's basketball team =

American college basketball season

1997–98 Rhode Island Rams men's basketball

NCAA tournament, Elite Eight
- Conference: Atlantic 10 Conference

Ranking
- Coaches: No. 11
- Record: 25–9 (12–4 A-10)
- Head coach: Jim Harrick (1st season)
- Assistant coach: Jerry DeGregorio (1st season)
- Home arena: Keaney Gymnasium

1997–98 Atlantic 10 men's basketball standings
	Conf.				Overall
Team	W		L	PCT	W		L	PCT
East
No. 24 Temple	13	–	3	.813	21	–	9	.700
Rhode Island	12	–	4	.750	25	–	9	.735
UMass	12	–	4	.750	21	–	11	.656
St. Bonaventure	6	–	10	.375	17	–	15	.531
Saint Joseph's	3	–	13	.188	11	–	17	.393
Fordham	2	–	14	.125	6	–	21	.222
West
No. 23 Xavier †	11	–	5	.688	22	–	8	.733
George Washington	11	–	5	.688	24	–	9	.727
Dayton	11	–	5	.688	21	–	12	.636
Virginia Tech	5	–	11	.313	10	–	17	.370
Duquesne	5	–	11	.313	11	–	19	.367
La Salle	5	–	11	.313	9	–	18	.333
† 1998 Atlantic 10 Tournament winner Rankings from AP Poll

The 1997–98 Rhode Island Rams men's basketball team represented the University of Rhode Island in the 1997–98 college basketball season. This was head coach Jim Harrick's first of two seasons at Rhode Island. The Rams competed in the Atlantic 10 Conference and played their home games at Keaney Gymnasium. They finished the season 25–9, 12–4 in A-10 play and lost in the semifinals of the 1998 Atlantic 10 men's basketball tournament. They were invited to the 1998 NCAA tournament where they advanced to the Elite Eight before falling to Stanford in the Midwest Regional final.

As of the 2025–26 NCAA Division I men's basketball season, this is the furthest any Rhode Island men's team has ever advanced in the NCAA tournament.

== Roster ==
1997–98 Rhode Island Rams men's basketball team
Players
Coaches

Pos.	#	Name	Height	Weight	Year	Hometown
G	12	Cuttino Mobley	6 ft 4 in (1.93 m)	185 lb (84 kg)	Sr	Philadelphia, Pennsylvania
G	21	Tyson Wheeler	5 ft 10 in (1.78 m)	165 lb (75 kg)	Sr	New London, Connecticut
F		Lamar Odom (redshirt)	6 ft 10 in (2.08 m)	—	Fr	Queens, New York
F/C	34	Antonio Reynolds-Dean	6 ft 7 in (2.01 m)	210 lb (95 kg)	Jr	Marietta, Georgia

Head coach

- Jim Harrick

Assistant coach(es)

Legend

- (C) Team captain
- (S) Suspended
- (I) Ineligible
- (W) Walk-on
- Injured
- Current redshirt

== Schedule and results ==
Date time, TV	Rank^{#}	Opponent^{#}	Result	Record	Site (attendance) city, state
Regular season
Nov 17, 1997*	No. 21	North Carolina-Wilmington	W 78–69	1–0	Keaney Gymnasium; Kingston, Rhode Island
Nov 19, 1997*	No. 20	at No. 12 Connecticut	L 67–80	1–1	Harry A. Gampel Pavilion; Storrs, Connecticut
Nov 30, 1997*		at Boston University	W 86–63	2–1	Case Gym; Boston, Massachusetts
Dec 3, 1997*		at Brown	W 75–57	3–1	Pizzitola Sports Center; Providence, Rhode Island
Dec 9, 1997*		Providence	W 69–58	4–1	Keaney Gymnasium; Kingston, Rhode Island
Dec 13, 1997*		UNLV	W 91–73	5–1	Keaney Gymnasium (6,429); Kingston, Rhode Island
Dec 22, 1997*	No. 22	Ohio	W 85–72	6–1	Keaney Gymnasium; Kingston, Rhode Island
Dec 29, 1997*	No. 24	vs. No. 7 Stanford; Cable Car Classic	L 69–70	6–2	San Jose Arena (6,109); San Jose, California
Dec 30, 1997*	No. 24	vs. Penn; Cable Car Classic	W 96–89	7–2	San Jose Arena; San Jose, California
Jan 4, 1998	No. 24	at Temple	W 74–64	8–2 (1–0)	Liacouras Center; Philadelphia, Pennsylvania
Jan 6, 1998	No. 23	at Saint Joseph's	W 83–68	9–2 (2–0)	Hagan Arena; Philadelphia, Pennsylvania
Jan 10, 1998	No. 23	Duquesne	W 83–76	10–2 (3–0)	Keaney Gymnasium; Kingston, Rhode Island
Jan 13, 1998	No. 20	at La Salle	W 84–73	11–2 (4–0)	The Spectrum; Philadelphia, Pennsylvania
Jan 15, 1998*	No. 20	Tulane	W 85–61	12–2	Keaney Gymnasium; Kingston, Rhode Island
Jan 17, 1998	No. 20	at St. Bonaventure	L 81–86	12–3 (4–1)	Reilly Center; St. Bonaventure, New York
Jan 22, 1998	No. 22	Virginia Tech	W 73–66	13–3 (5–1)	Keaney Gymnasium; Kingston, Rhode Island
Jan 25, 1998*	No. 22	at No. 21 Cincinnati	L 82–88	13–4	Myrl Shoemaker Center; Cincinnati, Ohio
Jan 29, 1998	No. 21	UMass	L 57–74	13–5 (5–2)	Keaney Gymnasium; Kingston, Rhode Island
Feb 1, 1998	No. 21	at Fordham	W 75–70	14–5 (6–2)	Rose Hill Gym; Bronx, New York
Feb 3, 1998		Saint Joseph's	W 94–76	15–5 (7–2)	Keaney Gymnasium; Kingston, Rhode Island
Feb 7, 1998*		California	W 72–63	16–5	Keaney Gymnasium; Kingston, Rhode Island
Feb 8, 1998		St. Bonaventure	W 67–66	17–5 (8–2)	Keaney Gymnasium; Kingston, Rhode Island
Feb 10, 1998	No. 25	at No. 17 George Washington	W 69–61	18–5 (9–2)	Charles E. Smith Center; Washington, D.C.
Feb 14, 1998	No. 25	Temple	L 67–68	18–6 (9–3)	Keaney Gymnasium; Kingston, Rhode Island
Feb 18, 1998		at No. 18 UMass	W 87–85 ^{2OT}	19–6 (10–3)	Mullins Center; Amherst, Massachusetts
Feb 21, 1998		at Dayton	L 62–71	19–7 (10–4)	University of Dayton Arena; Dayton, Ohio
Feb 24, 1998		Xavier	W 69–68	20–7 (11–4)	Keaney Gymnasium; Kingston, Rhode Island
Feb 28, 1998		Fordham	W 71–57	21–7 (12–4)	Keaney Gymnasium; Kingston, Rhode Island
Atlantic 10 tournament
Mar 5, 1998*	(E2)	vs. (W3) Dayton; Quarterfinals	W 83–70	22–7	The Spectrum; Philadelphia, Pennsylvania
Mar 6, 1998*	(E2)	vs. (W1) Xavier; Semifinals	L 80–95	22–8	The Spectrum; Philadelphia, Pennsylvania
NCAA tournament
Mar 13, 1998*	(8 MW)	vs. (9 MW) No. 25 Murray State; First round	W 97–74	23–8	Myriad Convention Center; Oklahoma City, Oklahoma
Mar 15, 1998*	(8 MW)	vs. (1 MW) No. 2 Kansas; Second Round	W 80–75	24–8	Myriad Convention Center; Oklahoma City, Oklahoma
Mar 20, 1998*	(8 MW)	vs. (13 MW) Valparaiso; Midwest Regional semifinal – Sweet Sixteen	W 74–68	25–8	Scottrade Center; St. Louis, Missouri
Mar 22, 1998*	(8 MW)	vs. (3 MW) No. 10 Stanford; Midwest Regional final – Elite Eight	L 77–79	25–9	Scottrade Center; St. Louis, Missouri
*Non-conference game. ^{#}Rankings from AP poll. (#) Tournament seedings in parentheses. MW=Midwest. All times are in EST.

== Rankings ==
Ranking movements Legend: ██ Increase in ranking ██ Decrease in ranking — = Not ranked
	Week																		
Poll	Pre	1	2	3	4	5	6	7	8	9	10	11	12	13	14	15	16	17	Final
AP	21	20	23	—	—	—	22	24	23	20	22	21	—	25	—	—	—	—	Not released
Coaches	25	25^	—	—	—	—	—	—	25	23	22	21	23	24	25	—	—	—	11

*AP does not release post-NCAA Tournament rankings
^Coaches did not release a week 2 poll

== Awards and honors ==
- Cuttino Mobley – Atlantic 10 Player of the Year
- Tyson Wheeler – AP Honorable Mention All-American

== 1998 NBA draft ==
Round	Pick	Player	NBA Team
2	41	Cuttino Mobley	Houston Rockets
2	47	Tyson Wheeler	Toronto Raptors
