= 1997–98 William & Mary Tribe men's basketball team =

American college basketball season

1997–98 William & Mary Tribe men's basketball

CAA Regular Season Co-Champions
- Conference: Colonial Athletic Association
- Record: 20–7 (13–3 CAA)
- Head coach: Charlie Woollum (4th season)
- Home arena: William & Mary Hall

1997–98 CAA men's basketball standings
	Conf.				Overall
Team	W		L	PCT	W		L	PCT
UNC Wilmington	13	–	3	.813	20	–	11	.645
William & Mary	13	–	3	.813	20	–	7	.741
Richmond †	12	–	4	.750	23	–	8	.742
Old Dominion	8	–	8	.500	12	–	16	.429
James Madison	6	–	10	.375	11	–	16	.407
George Mason	6	–	10	.375	9	–	18	.333
American	5	–	11	.313	9	–	19	.321
East Carolina	5	–	11	.313	10	–	17	.370
VCU	4	–	12	.250	9	–	19	.321
† 1998 CAA tournament winner Rankings from AP Poll

The 1997–98 William & Mary Tribe men's basketball team represented the College of William & Mary in intercollegiate basketball during the 1997–98 season. Under the fourth year of head coach Charlie Woollum, the team finished the season 20–7 and 13–3 in the Colonial Athletic Association. William & Mary played its home games at William & Mary Hall. This was the 93rd season of the collegiate basketball program at William & Mary.

William & Mary finished tied for first place in the CAA with UNC Wilmington, clinching just the second regular season conference title for the Tribe and first since 1982–83 (also the last time the Tribe won 20 games in a season). Even though the Tribe received the #2 seed for the 1998 CAA men's basketball tournament, they lost to American in the quarterfinals and were not invited to a post-season tournament.

== Program notes ==
- Charlie Woollum was named CAA Coach of the Year, the first William & Mary coach to win the award since Bruce Parkhill in 1983.
- Randy Bracy was named to the First Team All-CAA, and Terence Jennings was named to the Second Team.

== Schedule ==
Date time, TV	Rank^{#}	Opponent^{#}	Result	Record	Site (attendance) city, state
Regular season
November 15*		Stetson	W 72–61	1–0	William & Mary Hall; Williamsburg, VA
November 19*; 7:30 pm		at Virginia	L 45–59	1–1	University Hall (5,864); Charlottesville, VA
November 26*		Virginia Tech	L 64–66	1–2	William & Mary Hall; Williamsburg, VA
November 29*		at UNC Greensboro	W 68–55	2–2	Fleming Gymnasium; Greensboro, NC
December 1*		Hampton	W 69–54	3–2	William & Mary Hall; Williamsburg, VA
December 3*		at Furman	W 80–57	4–2	Timmons Arena; Greenville, SC
December 28*		at Wichita State; Cessna Classic	L 74–76 ^{OT}	4–3	Levitt Arena; Wichita, KS
December 29*		vs. Texas Southern; Cessna Classic	W 83–76	5–3	Levitt Arena; Wichita, KS
January 3		VCU	W 67–53	6–3 (1–0)	William & Mary Hall; Williamsburg, VA
January 7		American	W 69–56	7–3 (2–0)	William & Mary Hall; Williamsburg, VA
January 10		at East Carolina	W 72–63	8–3 (3–0)	Williams Arena at Minges Coliseum; Greenville, NC
January 12*		Navy	W 83–68	9–3	William & Mary Hall; Williamsburg, VA
January 14		at James Madison	W 89–60	10–3 (4–0)	JMU Convocation Center; Harrisonburg, VA
January 17*		Centenary	W 78–48	11–3	William & Mary Hall; Williamsburg, VA
January 19		at Richmond	L 59–70	11–4 (4–1)	Robins Center; Richmond, VA
January 21		George Mason	W 84–66	12–4 (5–1)	William & Mary Hall; Williamsburg, VA
January 24		Old Dominion	W 69–53	13–4 (6–1)	William & Mary Hall; Williamsburg, VA
January 28		at UNC Wilmington	L 56–58	13–5 (6–2)	Trask Coliseum; Wilmington, NC
January 31		at American	L 56–61	13–6 (6–3)	Bender Arena; Washington, DC
February 3		at Old Dominion	W 68–58	14–6 (7–3)	ODU Fieldhouse; Norfolk, VA
February 7		Richmond	W 73–70	15–6 (8–3)	William & Mary Hall; Williamsburg, VA
February 11		James Madison	W 53–52	16–6 (9–3)	William & Mary Hall; Williamsburg, VA
February 14		UNC Wilmington	W 64–51	17–6 (10–3)	William & Mary Hall; Williamsburg, VA
February 16		at George Mason	W 81–80 ^{OT}	18–6 (11–3)	Patriot Center; Fairfax, VA
February 18		East Carolina	W 74–69	19–6 (12–3)	William & Mary Hall; Williamsburg, VA
February 23		at VCU	W 72–67	20–6 (13–3)	Richmond Coliseum; Richmond, VA
1998 CAA Men's Basketball Tournament
February 27		vs. (7) American; Quarterfinals	L 66–71	20–7	Richmond Coliseum; Richmond, VA
*Non-conference game. ^{#}Rankings from AP Poll. (#) Tournament seedings in parentheses.
