= 1997–98 Xavier Musketeers men's basketball team =

American college basketball season

1997–98 Xavier Musketeers men's basketball

Atlantic 10 tournament champions Atlantic 10 West co-champions

NCAA tournament, First Round
- Conference: Atlantic 10 Conference

Ranking
- AP: No. 23
- Record: 22–8 (11–5 A10)
- Head coach: Skip Prosser (4th season)
- Home arena: Cincinnati Gardens

1997–98 Atlantic 10 men's basketball standings
	Conf.				Overall
Team	W		L	PCT	W		L	PCT
East
No. 24 Temple	13	–	3	.813	21	–	9	.700
Rhode Island	12	–	4	.750	25	–	9	.735
UMass	12	–	4	.750	21	–	11	.656
St. Bonaventure	6	–	10	.375	17	–	15	.531
Saint Joseph's	3	–	13	.188	11	–	17	.393
Fordham	2	–	14	.125	6	–	21	.222
West
No. 23 Xavier †	11	–	5	.688	22	–	8	.733
George Washington	11	–	5	.688	24	–	9	.727
Dayton	11	–	5	.688	21	–	12	.636
Virginia Tech	5	–	11	.313	10	–	17	.370
Duquesne	5	–	11	.313	11	–	19	.367
La Salle	5	–	11	.313	9	–	18	.333
† 1998 Atlantic 10 Tournament winner Rankings from AP Poll

The 1997–98 Xavier Musketeers men's basketball team represented Xavier University from Cincinnati, Ohio in the 1997–98 season. Led by head coach Skip Prosser, the Musketeers finished 22–8 (11–5 A-10) in the regular season, and won the Atlantic 10 tournament. In the NCAA tournament, the No. 6 seed Musketeers were upset in the opening round by No. 11 seed Washington, 69–68.

== Roster ==
1997–98 Xavier Musketeers men's basketball team
Players
Coaches

Pos.	#	Name	Height	Weight	Year	Hometown
G	4	Lenny Brown	6 ft 2 in (1.88 m)	190 lb (86 kg)	Jr	Wilmington, Delaware
G	12	Gary Lumpkin	6 ft 2 in (1.88 m)	—	Jr	New Castle, Delaware
F	41	James Posey	6 ft 8 in (2.03 m)	210 lb (95 kg)	Jr	Cleveland, Ohio
C	50	Torraye Braggs	6 ft 8 in (2.03 m)	235 lb (107 kg)	Sr	Fresno, California

Head coach

- Skip Prosser

Assistant coach(es)

Legend

- (C) Team captain
- (S) Suspended
- (I) Ineligible
- (W) Walk-on
- Injured
- Current redshirt

== Schedule and results ==
Date time, TV	Rank^{#}	Opponent^{#}	Result	Record	Site city, state
Non-conference regular season
Nov 19, 1997*	No. 10	Toledo	W 95–76	1–0	Cincinnati Gardens; Cincinnati, Ohio
Nov 22, 1997*	No. 10	Akron	W 97–73	2–0	Cincinnati Gardens; Cincinnati, Ohio
Nov 24, 1997*	No. 10	Louisiana-Monroe	W 118–61	3–0	Cincinnati Gardens; Cincinnati, Ohio
Dec 2, 1997*	No. 9	Central Michigan	W 88–54	4–0	Cincinnati Gardens; Cincinnati, Ohio
Dec 6, 1997*	No. 9	at Western Kentucky	W 93–60	5–0	E.A. Diddle Arena; Bowling Green, Kentucky
Dec 9, 1997*	No. 7	at Miami (OH)	L 72–80	5–1	Millett Hall; Oxford, Ohio
Dec 13, 1997*	No. 7	Cincinnati	W 88–68	6–1	Cincinnati Gardens; Cincinnati, Ohio
Dec 20, 1997*	No. 10	vs. No. 8 Purdue	L 84–86	6–2	Market Square Arena; Indianapolis, Indiana
Dec 27, 1997*	No. 13	vs. DePaul	W 73–56	7–2	Gund Arena; Cleveland, Ohio
Dec 30, 1997*	No. 13	Butler	W 93–66	8–2	Cincinnati Gardens; Cincinnati, Ohio
Atlantic 10 Regular season
Jan 3, 1998	No. 13	at St. Bonaventure	L 77–80	8–3 (0–1)	Reilly Center; St. Bonaventure, New York
Jan 7, 1998	No. 19	La Salle	W 104–67	9–3 (1–1)	Cincinnati Gardens; Cincinnati, Ohio
Jan 10, 1998	No. 19	Fordham	W 77–43	10–3 (2–1)	Cincinnati Gardens; Cincinnati, Ohio
Jan 14, 1998	No. 18	at George Washington	L 73–78 ^{OT}	10–4 (2–2)	Charles E. Smith Center; Washington, D.C.
Jan 17, 1998	No. 18	Virginia Tech	W 77–66	11–4 (3–2)	Cincinnati Gardens; Cincinnati, Ohio
Jan 20, 1998	No. 19	Saint Joseph's	W 72–62	12–4 (4–2)	Cincinnati Gardens; Cincinnati, Ohio
Jan 24, 1998	No. 19	at Dayton	L 82–93	12–5 (4–3)	University of Dayton Arena; Dayton, Ohio
Jan 27, 1998	No. 24	Duquesne	W 93–71	13–5 (5–3)	Cincinnati Gardens; Cincinnati, Ohio
Jan 31, 1998	No. 24	at Temple	W 79–73	14–5 (6–3)	Liacouras Center; Philadelphia, Pennsylvania
Feb 2, 1998	No. 24	at La Salle	W 91–59	15–5 (7–3)	The Spectrum; Philadelphia, Pennsylvania
Feb 8, 1998	No. 21	No. 23 UMass	L 62–73	15–6 (7–4)	Cincinnati Gardens (10,100); Cincinnati, Ohio
Feb 14, 1998		at Virginia Tech	W 74–63	16–6 (8–4)	Cassell Coliseum; Blacksburg, Virginia
Feb 16, 1998		No. 17 George Washington	W 96–86	17–6 (9–4)	Cincinnati Gardens; Cincinnati, Ohio
Feb 21, 1998		at Duquesne	W 83–62	18–6 (10–4)	Palumbo Center; Pittsburgh, Pennsylvania
Feb 24, 1998		at Rhode Island	L 68–69	18–7 (10–5)	Keaney Gymnasium; Kingston, Rhode Island
Mar 1, 1998		Dayton	W 89–84	19–7 (11–5)	Cincinnati Gardens; Cincinnati, Ohio
Atlantic 10 Tournament
Mar 5, 1998*		vs. St. Bonaventure; Quarterfinals	W 68–44	20–7	The Spectrum; Philadelphia, Pennsylvania
Mar 6, 1998*		vs. Rhode Island; Semifinals	W 95–80	21–7	The Spectrum; Philadelphia, Pennsylvania
Mar 7, 1998*		vs. George Washington; Championship game	W 77–63	22–7	The Spectrum; Philadelphia, Pennsylvania
NCAA Tournament
Mar 12, 1998*; CBS	(6 E) No. 23	vs. (11 E) Washington; First Round	L 68–69	22–8	Verizon Center (19,288); Washington, D.C.
*Non-conference game. ^{#}Rankings from AP poll. (#) Tournament seedings in parentheses. E=East.
