= 1997–98 Richmond Spiders men's basketball team =

American college basketball season

1997–98 Richmond Spiders men's basketball

CAA tournament champions

NCAA tournament, Round of 32
- Conference: Colonial Athletic Association
- Record: 23–8 (12–4 CAA)
- Head coach: John Beilein (1st season)
- Home arena: Robins Center

1997–98 CAA men's basketball standings
	Conf.				Overall
Team	W		L	PCT	W		L	PCT
UNC Wilmington	13	–	3	.813	20	–	11	.645
William & Mary	13	–	3	.813	20	–	7	.741
Richmond †	12	–	4	.750	23	–	8	.742
Old Dominion	8	–	8	.500	12	–	16	.429
James Madison	6	–	10	.375	11	–	16	.407
George Mason	6	–	10	.375	9	–	18	.333
American	5	–	11	.313	9	–	19	.321
East Carolina	5	–	11	.313	10	–	17	.370
VCU	4	–	12	.250	9	–	19	.321
† 1998 CAA tournament winner Rankings from AP Poll

The 1997–98 Richmond Spiders men's basketball team represented the University of Richmond in National Collegiate Athletic Association (NCAA) Division I college basketball during the 1997–98 season. Richmond competed as a member of the Colonial Athletic Association (CAA) under first-year head basketball coach John Beilein and played its home games at the Robins Center.

Richmond finished third in the CAA regular-season standings with a 12–4 conference record, and won the CAA tournament to earn an automatic bid to the 1998 NCAA tournament. In the opening round, the Spiders defeated the seventh-ranked, No. 3 seed South Carolina, 62–61, at the MCI Center in Washington, D.C. Richmond lost in the second round to No. 11 seed Washington, 81–66, to finish with a 23–8 record.

== Roster ==
1997–98 Richmond Spiders men's basketball team
Players
Coaches

Pos.	#	Name	Height	Weight	Year	Previous school	Hometown
G	3	Jarod Stevenson	6 ft 6 in (1.98 m)	210 lb (95 kg)	Sr	Seventy-First
C	45	Eric Poole	6 ft 8 in (2.03 m)	—	Sr

Head coach

- John Beilein

Assistant coach(es)

Legend

- (C) Team captain
- (S) Suspended
- (I) Ineligible
- (W) Walk-on
- Injured
- Current redshirt

== Schedule and results ==
Date time, TV	Rank^{#}	Opponent^{#}	Result	Record	Site city, state
Non-conference regular season
Nov 16, 1997*; 7:00 pm		Virginia; NationsBank Virginia Challenge	W 83–79 ^{2OT}	1–0	Robins Center (8,463); Richmond, Virginia
Nov 19, 1997*		No. 4 North Carolina	L 65–84	1–1	Robins Center; Richmond, Virginia
Nov 24, 1997*		at Florida Atlantic	W 81–50	2–1	FAU Arena; Boca Raton, Florida
Nov 29, 1997*		at Wake Forest	L 67–71	2–2	Lawrence Joel Coliseum; Winston-Salem, North Carolina
Dec 5, 1997*		vs. Samford; San Francisco Tournament	W 70–38	3–2	War Memorial Gymnasium; San Francisco, California
Dec 6, 1997*		at San Francisco; San Francisco Tournament	L 60–64	3–3	War Memorial Gymnasium; San Francisco, California
Dec 20, 1997*		at Campbell	W 71–49	4–3	Carter Gymnasium; Buies Creek, North Carolina
Dec 29, 1997*		vs. UNC Asheville; Dr. Pepper Classic	W 71–55	5–3	
Dec 30, 1997*		vs. UNC Greensboro; Dr. Pepper Classic	W 83–72	6–3	
CAA Regular season
Jan 3, 1998		at James Madison	W 87–68	7–3 (1–0)	Convocation Center; Harrisonburg, Virginia
Non-conference regular season
Jan 7, 1998*		Drexel	W 66–57	8–3	Robins Center; Richmond, Virginia
CAA Regular season
Jan 10, 1998		UNC Wilmington	W 61–58	9–3 (2–0)	Robins Center; Richmond, Virginia
Jan 14, 1998		American	W 73–57	10–3 (3–0)	Robins Center; Richmond, Virginia
Jan 17, 1998		at East Carolina	L 67–77	10–4 (3–1)	Minges Coliseum; Greenville, North Carolina
Jan 19, 1998		William & Mary	W 70–59	11–4 (4–1)	Robins Center; Richmond, Virginia
Jan 21, 1998		at Old Dominion	L 57–62	11–5 (4–2)	ODU Fieldhouse; Norfolk, Virginia
Jan 24, 1998		at VCU	W 56–52	12–5 (5–2)	Richmond Coliseum; Richmond, Virginia
Jan 28, 1998		George Mason	W 87–65	13–5 (6–2)	Robins Center; Richmond, Virginia
Jan 31, 1998		James Madison	W 57–50	14–5 (7–2)	Robins Center; Richmond, Virginia
Feb 4, 1998		East Carolina	W 79–64	15–5 (8–2)	Robins Center; Richmond, Virginia
Feb 7, 1998		at William & Mary	L 70–73	15–6 (8–3)	William & Mary Hall; Williamsburg, Virginia
Feb 9, 1998		at UNC Wilmington	L 59–62	15–7 (8–4)	Trask Coliseum; Wilmington, North Carolina
Feb 16, 1998		at American	W 77–41	16–7 (9–4)	Bender Arena; Washington, D.C.
Feb 18, 1998		at George Mason	W 61–56	17–7 (10–4)	Patriot Center; Fairfax, Virginia
Feb 21, 1998		VCU	W 67–61	18–7 (11–4)	Robins Center; Richmond, Virginia
Feb 23, 1998		Old Dominion	W 85–77	19–7 (12–4)	Robins Center; Richmond, Virginia
CAA Tournament
Feb 25, 1998*	(3)	(6) George Mason; Quarterfinals	W 66–49	20–7	Richmond Coliseum; Richmond, Virginia
Feb 28, 1998*	(3)	(7) American; Semifinals	W 66–64	21–7	Richmond Coliseum; Richmond, Virginia
Mar 1, 1998*	(3)	(1) UNC Wilmington; Championship Game	W 79–64	22–7	Robins Center; Richmond, Virginia
NCAA tournament
Mar 12, 1998*	(14 E)	vs. (3 E) No. 14 South Carolina; First Round	W 62–61	23–7	MCI Center; Washington, D.C.
Mar 14, 1998*	(14 E)	vs. (11 E) Washington; Second Round	L 66–81	23–8	MCI Center; Washington, D.C.
*Non-conference game. ^{#}Rankings from AP poll. (#) Tournament seedings in parentheses. E=East. All times are in Eastern.

== Awards and honors ==
- Jarod Stevenson – CAA Player of the Year
