= 1997–98 Stanford Cardinal men's basketball team =

American college basketball season

1997–98 Stanford Cardinal men's basketball

Big Island Invitational champion

NCAA tournament, Final Four
- Conference: Pacific-10 Conference

Ranking
- Coaches: No. 4
- AP: No. 10
- Record: 30–5 (15–3 Pac-10)
- Head coach: Mike Montgomery (12th season)
- Assistant coaches: Eric Reveno; Trent Johnson
- Home arena: Maples Pavilion (Capacity: 7,392)

1997–98 Pacific-10 Conference men's basketball standings
	Conf.				Overall
Team	W		L	PCT	W		L	PCT
No. 4 Arizona	17	–	1	.944	30	–	5	.857
No. 10 Stanford	15	–	3	.833	30	–	5	.857
No. 19 UCLA	12	–	6	.667	24	–	9	.727
Washington	11	–	7	.611	20	–	10	.667
Arizona State	8	–	10	.444	18	–	14	.563
Oregon	8	–	10	.444	13	–	14	.481
California	8	–	10	.444	12	–	15	.444
USC	5	–	13	.278	9	–	19	.321
Oregon State	3	–	15	.167	13	–	17	.433
Washington State	3	–	15	.167	10	–	19	.345
As of November 23, 2011; Rankings from AP Poll

The 1997–98 Stanford Cardinal men's basketball team represented Stanford University as a member of the Pac-10 Conference during the 1997–98 NCAA Division I men's basketball season. The team was led by head coach Mike Montgomery and played their home games at Maples Pavilion. Stanford finished second in the Pac-10 regular season standings and received an at-large bid to the 1998 NCAA tournament. The Cardinal would reach the Final Four for the first time in 56 years by defeating No. 14 seed College of Charleston, No. 11 seed Western Michigan, No. 2 seed Purdue, and No. 8 seed Rhode Island. The season came to and end after a 1-point overtime loss to eventual National champion Kentucky in the National Semifinals. Stanford finished with an overall record of 30–5 (15–3 Pac-10).

== Roster ==
1997–98 Stanford Cardinal men's basketball team
Players
Coaches

Pos.	#	Name	Height	Weight	Year	Previous school	Hometown
G	3	Kris Weems	6 ft 2 in (1.88 m)	—	Jr		Kansas City, KS
G	4	Michael McDonald	6 ft 1 in (1.85 m)	—	Fr		Long Beach, CA
F	5	Peter Sauer	6 ft 7 in (2.01 m)	—	Jr		Pittsburgh, PA
G	11	Arthur Lee	6 ft 1 in (1.85 m)	—	Jr		Los Angeles, CA
G	15	Dave Bennion	6 ft 3 in (1.91 m)	—	So		Palo Alto, CA
G	20	Alex Gelbard	6 ft 3 in (1.91 m)	—	Fr		Sherman Oaks, CA
G	21	David Moseley	6 ft 4 in (1.93 m)	—	So		Las Cruces, NM
G	30	Johannes Burge	6 ft 3 in (1.91 m)	—	So
C	31	Jarron Collins	6 ft 11 in (2.11 m)	248 lb (112 kg)	Fr	Harvard-Westlake School	North Hollywood, CA
F	32	Ryan Mendez	6 ft 7 in (2.01 m)	—	So		Burleson, TX
C	33	Jason Collins	6 ft 11 in (2.11 m)	248 lb (112 kg)	Fr	Harvard–Westlake School	North Hollywood, CA
G	35	Kamba Tshionyi	6 ft 2 in (1.88 m)	—	Sr		Eugene, OR
F	40	Pete Van Elswyk	6 ft 9 in (2.06 m)	—	Sr		Hamilton, CAN
F	44	Mark Seaton	6 ft 9 in (2.06 m)	—	Jr		Cypress, CA
F	45	Mark Madsen	6 ft 9 in (2.06 m)	235 lb (107 kg)	So	San Ramon Valley High School	Danville, CA
C	55	Tim Young	7 ft 0 in (2.13 m)	220 lb (100 kg)	Jr	Harbor High School	Santa Cruz, CA

Head coach

- Mike Montgomery (Long Beach State)

Assistant coach(es)

- Eric Reveno (Stanford)
- Trent Johnson (Boise State)

Legend

- (C) Team captain
- (S) Suspended
- (I) Ineligible
- (W) Walk-on
- Injured
- Current redshirt

Roster

== Schedule and results ==
Date time, TV	Rank^{#}	Opponent^{#}	Result	Record	Site (attendance) city, state
Regular season
November 18, 1997*	No. 15	San Diego	W 87–57	1–0	Maples Pavilion (3,564); Stanford, CA
November 28, 1997*	No. 15	at Hawaii Hilo; Big Island Invitational	W 98–49	2–0	Afook-Chinen Civic Auditorium (2,146); Hilo, HI
November 29, 1997*	No. 15	vs. Valparaiso; Big Island Invitational	W 70–65	3–0	Afook-Chinen Civic Auditorium (2,420); Hilo, HI
November 30, 1997*	No. 15	vs. Butler; Big Island Invitational	W 99–86	4–0	Afook-Chinen Civic Auditorium (2,329); Hilo, HI
December 6, 1997*	No. 12	vs. No. 21 Georgia; Wooden Classic	W 76–74	5–0	Arrowhead Pond of Anaheim (8,947); Anaheim, CA
December 16, 1997*	No. 9	at San Diego State	W 63–42	6–0	Cox Arena at Aztec Bowl (5,096); San Diego, CA
December 19, 1997*	No. 9	Pacific	W 67–61	7–0	Maples Pavilion (7,293); Stanford, CA
December 22, 1997*	No. 8	UC Santa Barbara	W 95–62	8–0	Maples Pavilion (5,813); Stanford, CA
December 27, 1997*	No. 8	Lehigh	W 95–42	9–0	Maples Pavilion (4,357); Stanford, CA
December 29, 1997*	No. 7	vs. No. 22 Rhode Island; Cable Car Classic	W 70–69	10–0	San Jose Arena (6,109); San Jose, CA
December 30, 1997*	No. 7	vs. Santa Clara; Cable Car Classic	W 69–60	11–0	San Jose Arena (6,233); San Jose, CA
January 3, 1998	No. 7	at Oregon State	W 68–48	12–0 (1–0)	Gill Coliseum (8,133); Corvallis, OR
January 5, 1998	No. 7	at Oregon	W 89–67	13–0 (2–0)	McArthur Court (7,355); Eugene, OR
January 10, 1998	No. 7	California	W 84–74	14–0 (3–0)	Maples Pavilion (7,391); Stanford, CA
January 15, 1998	No. 7	USC	W 99–62	15–0 (4–0)	Maples Pavilion (7,391); Stanford, CA
January 17, 1998; CBS	No. 7	No. 8 UCLA	W 93–80	16–0 (5–0)	Maples Pavilion (7,391); Stanford, CA
January 22, 1998	No. 5	at Washington State	W 82–72	17–0 (6–0)	Beasley Coliseum (4,744); Pullman, WA
January 24, 1998	No. 5	at Washington	W 74–72	18–0 (7–0)	Hec Edmundson Pavilion (6,560); Seattle, WA
January 29, 1998	No. 4	No. 6 Arizona	L 75–93	18–1 (7–1)	Maples Pavilion; Stanford, CA
January 31, 1998	No. 4	Arizona State	L 87–90 ^{OT}	18–2 (7–2)	Maples Pavilion; Stanford, CA
February 4, 1998	No. 9	at California	W 74–72	19–2 (8–2)	The Arena in Oakland; Oakland, CA
February 7, 1998*; CBS	No. 9	at No. 7 Connecticut	L 56–76	19–3	Harry A. Gampel Pavilion (10,027); Storrs, CT
February 12, 1998; FSN	No. 14	at No. 9 UCLA	W 84–81	20–3 (9–2)	Pauley Pavilion; Los Angeles, CA
February 14, 1998	No. 14	at USC	W 83–59	21–3 (10–2)	L.A. Sports Arena; Los Angeles, CA
February 19, 1998	No. 10	Washington	W 93–70	22–3 (11–2)	Maples Pavilion; Stanford, CA
February 21, 1998	No. 10	Washington State	W 72–56	23–3 (12–2)	Maples Pavilion; Stanford, CA
February 26, 1998	No. 8	at Arizona State	W 86–73	24–3 (13–2)	Wells Fargo Arena; Tempe AZ
February 28, 1998	No. 8	at No. 2 Arizona	L 58–90	24–4 (13–3)	McKale Center; Tucson, AZ
March 5, 1998	No. 11	Oregon	W 95–67	25–4 (14–3)	Maples Pavilion; Stanford, CA
March 7, 1998	No. 11	Oregon State	W 85–77	26–4 (15–3)	Maples Pavilion; Stanford, CA
NCAA tournament
March 13, 1998*; CBS	(3 MW) No. 10	(14 MW) College of Charleston; First round	W 67–57	27–4	United Center; Chicago, IL
March 15, 1998*; 12:00 pm, CBS	(3 MW) No. 10	(11 MW) Western Michigan; Second round	W 83–65	28–4	United Center; Chicago, IL
March 20, 1998*; CBS	(3 MW) No. 10	(2 MW) Purdue; Sweet Sixteen	W 67–59	29–4	Scottrade Center; St. Louis, MO
March 22, 1998*; CBS	(3 MW) No. 10	(8 MW) Rhode Island; Elite Eight	W 79–77	30–4	Scottrade Center; St. Louis, MO
March 28, 1998*; CBS	(3 MW) No. 10	(2 S) Kentucky; Final Four	L 85–86 ^{OT}	30–5	Alamodome (40,509); San Antonio, TX
*Non-conference game. ^{#}Rankings from AP Poll. (#) Tournament seedings in parentheses. MW=Midwest. All times are in Pacific Time. (#) during NCAA is seed within region.

Poll Source: Schedule Source:

=== NCAA basketball tournament ===
- West
  - Stanford (#3 seed) 67, Charleston, South Carolina (#14 seed) 57
  - Stanford 83, Western Michigan (#11 seed) 65
  - Stanford 67, Purdue (#2 seed) 59
  - Stanford 79, Rhode Island (#8 seed) 77
- Final Four
  - Kentucky 86, Stanford 85

== Rankings ==
Ranking movements Legend: ██ Increase in ranking ██ Decrease in ranking
	Week																		
Poll	Pre	1	2	3	4	5	6	7	8	9	10	11	12	13	14	15	16	17	Final
AP	14	15	15	12	11	9	8	7	7	7	5	4	9	14	10	8	11	10	Not released
Coaches	12	12^	13	11	11	9	8	8	7	7	6	5	10	13	11	9	11	10	4

*AP does not release post-NCAA Tournament rankings
^Coaches did not release a week 2 poll
