= 1997–98 George Mason Patriots men's basketball team =

American college basketball season

1997–98 George Mason Patriots men's basketball
- Conference: Colonial Athletic Association
- Record: 9–18 (6–10 CAA)
- Head coach: Jim Larrañaga (1st season)
- Assistant coaches: Derek Kellogg; Bill Courtney; Mike Gillian
- Home arena: Patriot Center

1997–98 CAA men's basketball standings
	Conf.				Overall
Team	W		L	PCT	W		L	PCT
UNC Wilmington	13	–	3	.813	20	–	11	.645
William & Mary	13	–	3	.813	20	–	7	.741
Richmond †	12	–	4	.750	23	–	8	.742
Old Dominion	8	–	8	.500	12	–	16	.429
James Madison	6	–	10	.375	11	–	16	.407
George Mason	6	–	10	.375	9	–	18	.333
American	5	–	11	.313	9	–	19	.321
East Carolina	5	–	11	.313	10	–	17	.370
VCU	4	–	12	.250	9	–	19	.321
† 1998 CAA tournament winner Rankings from AP Poll

The 1997–98 George Mason Patriots Men's basketball team represented George Mason University during the 1997–98 NCAA Division I men's basketball season. This was the 32nd season for the program, the first under head coach Jim Larrañaga. The Patriots played their home games at the Patriot Center in Fairfax, Virginia.

== Honors and awards ==
Colonial Athletic Association All-Conference Team

- George Evans (2nd team)
- Jason Miskiri (2nd team)

Colonial Athletic Association Rookie of the Year

- George Evans

Colonial Athletic Association All-Defensive Team

- George Evans

== Player statistics ==
Player	GP	FG%	3FG%	FT%	RPG	APG	SPG	BPG	PPG
Jason Miskiri	21	.386	.270	.702	4.4	4.4	1.9	0.3	15.9
George Evans	27	.527	.000	.593	8.1	1.5	1.5	1.5	13.4
Erik Herring	21	.495	.329	.556	3.8	2.1	1.6	0.2	10.1
Ahmad Dorsett	26	.412	.405	.529	2.7	0.7	1.2	0.3	9.8
Lee Brown	22	.413	.350	.577	1.9	1.5	0.8	0.0	6.2
Avery Carey	1	.250	.500	.000	4.0	0.0	0.0	1.0	5.0
Nsilo Abraham	26	.511	.000	.500	2.8	0.3	0.5	0.2	4.5
Nik Mirich	27	.435	.000	.651	3.7	0.9	0.4	0.4	3.8
Tremaine Price	24	.320	.192	.629	1.9	1.6	0.7	0.1	3.7
Jemel Ross	20	.333	.375	.800	1.0	0.2	0.2	0.0	2.3
Allen Johnson	10	.250	.000	.769	2.1	0.4	0.1	0.1	1.6
Leighton Henry	16	.162	.100	.500	0.6	0.1	0.3	0.1	1.0
Tom Carroll	17	.125	.000	.625	0.8	0.1	0.1	0.0	0.5

== Schedule and results ==
Date time, TV	Rank^{#}	Opponent^{#}	Result	Record	Site (attendance) city, state
Non-conference regular season
November 18, 1997*		at Howard	W 78–72	1–0	Burr Gymnasium; Washington, DC
November 22, 1997*; 1:00 pm		at Virginia	L 45–60	1–1	University Hall (2,163); Charlottesville, VA
November 25, 1997*		College of Charleston	L 56–68	1–2	Patriot Center (2,411); Fairfax, VA
November 29, 1997*		Akron	L 53–82	1–3	Patriot Center; Fairfax, VA
December 2, 1997*		at St. Francis (PA)	L 57–69	1–4	DeGol Arena; Loretto, PA
December 8, 1997*		at Penn State	L 46–85	1–5	Bryce Jordan Center; University Park, PA
December 19, 1997*		vs. Northern Illinois; UNO Holiday Classic	W 73–66	2–5	Lakefront Arena; New Orleans, LA
December 20, 1997*		at New Orleans; UNO Holiday Classic	L 63–72	2–6	Lakefront Arena; New Orleans, LA
December 27, 1997*		Northeastern; US Airways Holiday Classic	W 66–60	3–6	Patriot Center; Fairfax, VA
December 28, 1997*		George Washington; US Airways Holiday Classic; Revolutionary Rivalry	L 69–82	3–7	Patriot Center; Fairfax, VA
CAA regular season
January 3, 1998		East Carolina	W 66–51	4–7 (1–0)	Patriot Center; Fairfax, VA
January 5, 1998		UNC Wilmington	L 74–76	4–8 (1–1)	Patriot Center; Fairfax, VA
January 10, 1998		at VCU; Rivalry	W 62–54	5–8 (2–1)	Richmond Coliseum; Richmond, VA
January 14, 1998		at Old Dominion	L 50–58	5–9 (2–2)	ODU Fieldhouse; Norfolk, VA
January 17, 1998		American	W 72–55	6–9 (3–2)	Patriot Center; Fairfax, VA
January 21, 1998		at William & Mary	L 66–84	6–10 (3–3)	William & Mary Hall; Williamsburg, VA
January 24, 1998		James Madison	L 58–62	6–11 (3–4)	Patriot Center; Fairfax, VA
January 28, 1998		at Richmond	L 65–87	6–12 (3–5)	Robins Center; Richmond, VA
January 31, 1998		at UNC Wilmington	L 63–65 ^{OT}	6–13 (3–6)	Trask Coliseum; Wilmington, NC
February 2, 1998		at East Carolina	W 79–73 ^{OT}	7–13 (4–6)	Minges Coliseum; Greenville, NC
February 10, 1998		VCU; Rivalry	W 62–60	8–13 (5–6)	Patriot Center; Fairfax, VA
February 14, 1998		at American	W 65–63	9–13 (6–6)	Bender Arena; Washington, DC
February 16, 1998		William & Mary	L 80–81 ^{OT}	9–14 (6–7)	Patriot Center; Fairfax, VA
February 18, 1998		Richmond	L 56–61	9–15 (6–8)	Patriot Center; Fairfax, VA
February 21, 1998		Old Dominion	L 66–70	9–16 (6–9)	Patriot Center; Fairfax, VA
February 23, 1998		at James Madison	L 58–68	9–17 (6–10)	JMU Convocation Center; Harrisonburg, VA
1998 CAA tournament
February 27, 1998	(6)	vs. (3) Richmond; Quarterfinals	L 49–66	9–18	Richmond Coliseum; Richmond, VA
*Non-conference game. ^{#}Rankings from AP Poll. (#) Tournament seedings in parentheses. All times are in Eastern Time.
