= 1997–98 George Washington Colonials men's basketball team =

American college basketball season

1997–98 George Washington Colonials men's basketball

Atlantic 10 West co-champions

NCAA tournament, First Round
- Conference: Atlantic 10 Conference
- Record: 24–9 (11–5 A-10)
- Head coach: Mike Jarvis (8th season)
- Home arena: Charles E. Smith Athletic Center

1997–98 Atlantic 10 men's basketball standings
| | Conf. | | | | Overall |
| Team | W | | L | PCT | W | | L | PCT |
|---|---|---|---|---|---|---|---|---|
East
| No. 24 Temple | 13 | – | 3 | .813 | 21 | – | 9 | .700 |
| Rhode Island | 12 | – | 4 | .750 | 25 | – | 9 | .735 |
| UMass | 12 | – | 4 | .750 | 21 | – | 11 | .656 |
| St. Bonaventure | 6 | – | 10 | .375 | 17 | – | 15 | .531 |
| Saint Joseph's | 3 | – | 13 | .188 | 11 | – | 17 | .393 |
| Fordham | 2 | – | 14 | .125 | 6 | – | 21 | .222 |
West
| No. 23 Xavier † | 11 | – | 5 | .688 | 22 | – | 8 | .733 |
| George Washington | 11 | – | 5 | .688 | 24 | – | 9 | .727 |
| Dayton | 11 | – | 5 | .688 | 21 | – | 12 | .636 |
| Virginia Tech | 5 | – | 11 | .313 | 10 | – | 17 | .370 |
| Duquesne | 5 | – | 11 | .313 | 11 | – | 19 | .367 |
| La Salle | 5 | – | 11 | .313 | 9 | – | 18 | .333 |
† 1998 Atlantic 10 Tournament winner Rankings from AP Poll

The 1997–98 George Washington Colonials men's basketball team represent George Washington University as a member of the Atlantic 10 Conference during the 1997–98 NCAA Division I men's basketball season. The team was coached by Mike Jarvis and played their home games at the Charles E. Smith Athletic Center. The Colonials finished in a three-way tie for third place in the regular season conference standings. After being knocked out in the semifinal round of the A-10 tournament, GW received an at-large bid to the 1998 NCAA tournament as No. 9 seed in the Southeast region. The Colonials were defeated by No. 8 seed Oklahoma, 75–63, to finish with a record of 24–9 (11–5 A-10).

== Roster ==
1997–98 George Washington Colonials men's basketball team
| Players | Coaches |
|---|---|
| Pos. / # / Name / Height / Weight / Year / Hometown; G / 54 / Shawnta Rogers / 5 ft 4 in (1.63 m) / 155 lb (70 kg) / Jr / Baltimore, Maryland | Head coach: Mike Jarvis (Northeastern); Assistant coach(es) Legend: (C) Team captain; (S) Suspended; (I) Ineligible; (W) Walk-on; Injured; Current redshirt; Roster |

== Schedule and results ==
| Date time, TV | Rank^{#} | Opponent^{#} | Result | Record | Site city, state |
Non-conference regular season
| Nov 14, 1997* | | Howard | W 101–64 | 1–0 | Charles E. Smith Athletic Center; Washington, D.C. |
| Nov 15, 1997* | | Delaware | W 84–79 | 2–0 | Charles E. Smith Athletic Center; Washington, D.C. |
| Nov 19, 1997* | | American | W 74–47 | 3–0 | Charles E. Smith Athletic Center; Washington, D.C. |
| Nov 24, 1997*; 9:30 pm, ESPN | | vs. No. 9 Kentucky; Maui Invitational Tournament | W 70–55 | 3–1 | Lahaina Civic Center (2,500); Lahaina, Hawaii |
| Nov 25, 1997*; ESPN | | vs. Boston College; Maui Invitational Tournament | W 76–64 | 4–1 | Lahaina Civic Center (2,500); Lahaina, Hawaii |
| Nov 26, 1997*; ESPN | | vs. DePaul; Maui Invitational Tournament | W 60–46 | 5–1 | Lahaina Civic Center (2,500); Lahaina, Hawaii |
| Dec 3, 1997* | | at Texas Tech | L 57–80 | 5–2 | Lubbock Municipal Coliseum; Lubbock, Texas |
| Dec 7, 1997* | | vs. Penn; Franklin National Bank Classic | W 66–62 | 6–2 | MCI Center; Washington, D.C. |
| Dec 8, 1997* | | vs. No. 23 Maryland; Franklin National Bank Classic | W 70–66 | 7–2 | MCI Center; Washington, D.C. |
| Dec 13, 1997* | | at Old Dominion | W 58–56 | 8–2 | ODU Fieldhouse; Norfolk, Virginia |
| Dec 20, 1997* | | Charlotte | W 93–83 | 9–2 | Charles E. Smith Athletic Center; Washington, D.C. |
| Dec 27, 1997* | | vs. Army | W 91–59 | 10–2 | |
| Dec 28, 1997* | | at George Mason; US Airways Holiday Classic; Revolutionary Rivalry | W 82–69 | 11–2 | Patriot Center; Fairfax, Virginia |
Atlantic 10 regular season
| Jan 3, 1998 | | La Salle | W 78–68 | 12–2 (1–0) | Charles E. Smith Athletic Center; Washington, D.C. |
| Jan 7, 1998 | | Duquesne | W 90–68 | 13–2 (2–0) | Charles E. Smith Athletic Center; Washington, D.C. |
| Jan 10, 1998 | | at UMass | L 48–79 | 13–3 (2–1) | Mullins Center (9,493); Amherst, Massachusetts |
| Jan 14, 1998 | | No. 18 Xavier | W 78–73 ^{OT} | 14–3 (3–1) | Charles E. Smith Athletic Center; Washington, D.C. |
| Jan 18, 1998 | | Dayton | W 78–73 ^{OT} | 15–3 (4–1) | Charles E. Smith Athletic Center; Washington, D.C. |
| Jan 22, 1998 | | at Fordham | W 71–65 | 16–3 (5–1) | Rose Hill Gymnasium; The Bronx, New York |
| Jan 24, 1998 | | at Duquesne | W 94–83 | 17–3 (6–1) | Palumbo Center; Pittsburgh, Pennsylvania |
| Jan 31, 1998 | | Virginia Tech | W 75–61 | 18–3 (7–1) | Charles E. Smith Athletic Center; Washington, D.C. |
| Feb 5, 1998 | No. 22 | at La Salle | W 82–65 | 19–3 (8–1) | The Spectrum; Philadelphia, Pennsylvania |
| Feb 7, 1998 | No. 22 | at Saint Joseph's | W 67–62 | 20–3 (9–1) | Alumni Memorial Fieldhouse; Philadelphia, Pennsylvania |
| Feb 10, 1998 | No. 17 | No. 25 Rhode Island | L 61–69 | 20–4 (9–2) | Charles E. Smith Athletic Center; Washington, D.C. |
| Feb 14, 1998 | No. 17 | at Dayton | L 64–78 | 20–5 (9–3) | University of Dayton Arena; Dayton, Ohio |
| Feb 16, 1998 | No. 17 | at Xavier | L 86–96 | 20–6 (9–4) | Cincinnati Gardens; Cincinnati, Ohio |
| Feb 22, 1998 | No. 24 | Temple | L 49–56 | 20–7 (9–5) | Charles E. Smith Athletic Center; Washington, D.C. |
| Feb 25, 1998 | | at Virginia Tech | W 64–50 | 21–7 (10–5) | Cassell Coliseum; Blacksburg, Virginia |
| Feb 28, 1998 | | St. Bonaventure | W 71–67 | 22–7 (11–5) | Charles E. Smith Athletic Center; Washington, D.C. |
Atlantic 10 Tournament
| Mar 5, 1998* | (W2) | vs. (E3) UMass; Quarterfinals | W 88–83 | 23–7 | The Spectrum (7,545); Philadelphia, Pennsylvania |
| Mar 6, 1998* | (W2) | vs. (E1) No. 24 Temple; Semifinals | W 78-64 | 24–7 | The Spectrum; Philadelphia, Pennsylvania |
| Mar 7, 1998* | (W2) | vs. (W1) Xavier; Championship game | L 63–77 | 24–8 | The Spectrum; Philadelphia, Pennsylvania |
NCAA Tournament
| Mar 13, 1998* | (9 SE) | vs. (8 SE) Oklahoma State; First Round | L 59–74 | 24–9 | Rupp Arena (16,824); Lexington, Kentucky |
*Non-conference game. ^{#}Rankings from AP poll. (#) Tournament seedings in parentheses. SE=Southeast. All times are in Eastern Time.
