= James Posey =

American basketball coach and player (born 1977)

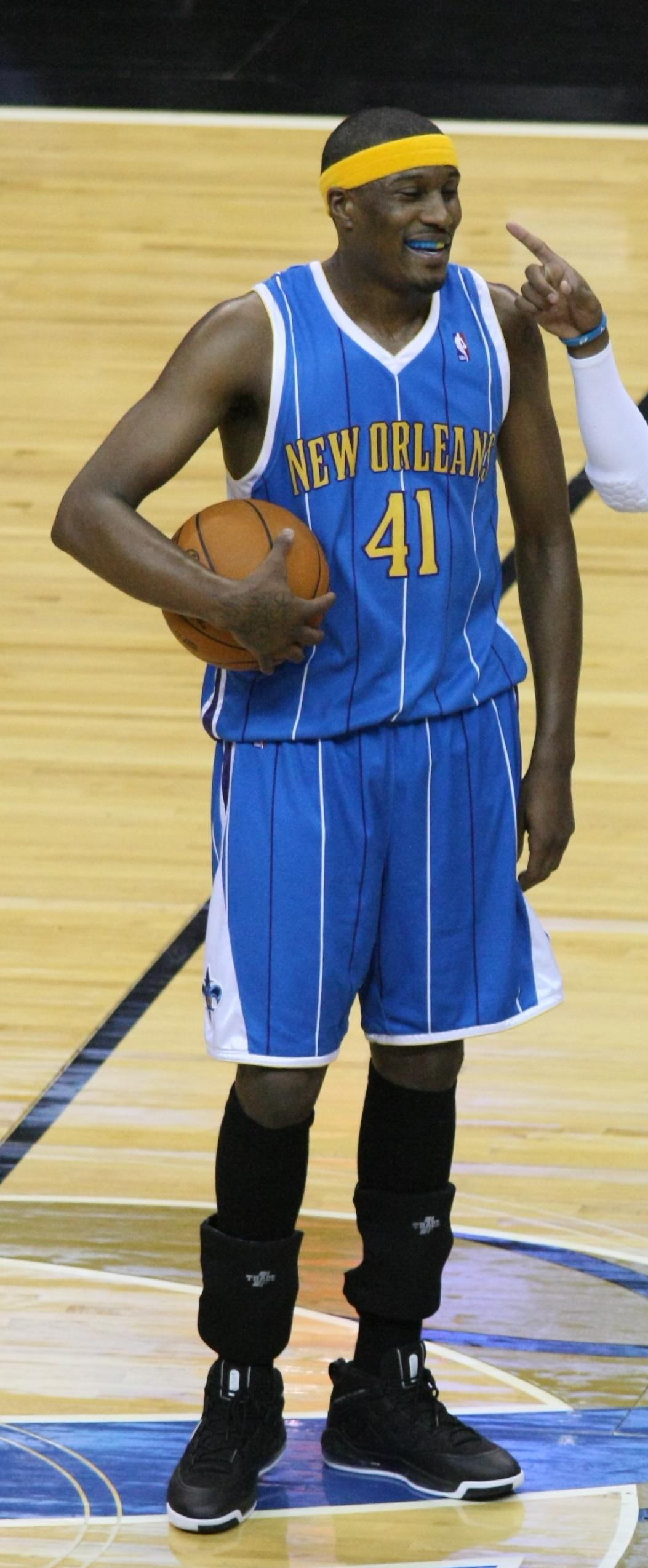
- Posey with the New Orleans Hornets in 2009

Portland Trail Blazers
- Title: Assistant coach
- League: NBA

Personal information
- Born: January 13, 1977 (age 49) Cleveland, Ohio, U.S.
- Listed height: 6 ft 8 in (2.03 m)
- Listed weight: 217 lb (98 kg)

Career information
- High school: R. B. Chamberlain (Twinsburg, Ohio)
- College: Xavier (1996–1999)
- NBA draft: 1999: 1st round, 18th overall pick
- Drafted by: Denver Nuggets
- Playing career: 1999–2011
- Position: Small forward / shooting guard
- Number: 41, 55, 42
- Coaching career: 2013–present

Career history

Playing
- 1999–2002: Denver Nuggets
- 2002–2003: Houston Rockets
- 2003–2005: Memphis Grizzlies
- 2005–2007: Miami Heat
- 2007–2008: Boston Celtics
- 2008–2010: New Orleans Hornets
- 2010–2011: Indiana Pacers

Career highlights
- As player: 2× NBA champion (2006, 2008); NBA All-Rookie Second Team (2000); Atlantic 10 Defensive Player of the Year (1999); First-team All-Atlantic 10 (1999); Second-team All-Atlantic 10 (1998); 2× Atlantic 10 Sixth Man of the Year (1997, 1998); Atlantic 10 All-Defensive Team (1999); Atlantic 10 Tournament MVP (1998); As assistant coach: NBA champion (2016)

Career NBA statistics
- Points: 4,214 (8.6 ppg)
- Rebounds: 4,532 (4.7 rpg)
- Assists: 903 (1.6 apg)
- Stats at NBA.com
- Stats at Basketball Reference
Medals
Men's basketball
Representing United States
Goodwill Games
Gold medal – first place	1998 New York	Team competition

James Mikely Mantell Posey Jr. (born January 13, 1977) is an American former professional basketball player who currently serves as an assistant coach for the Portland Trail Blazers of the National Basketball Association (NBA). He played the small forward position for the Denver Nuggets, Memphis Grizzlies, Miami Heat, Boston Celtics, New Orleans Hornets, and Indiana Pacers. Posey won NBA championships as a member of the 2006 Miami Heat and the 2008 Boston Celtics, and as an assistant coach for the 2016 Cleveland Cavaliers.

== College career ==
After attending High School in Twinsburg, Ohio, Posey came to Xavier University in the 1995–96 season, but under Prop 48 rules, was ineligible, so sat out his freshman year. Posey ranks 16th on Xavier's all-time scoring list with 1,455 points and 10th on Xavier's all-time rebounding list with 801. Posey led XU in rebounding in each of his three seasons as a Musketeer. Posey earned a long list of honors while at Xavier, including the 1998 Atlantic 10 Championship "Most Outstanding Player" Award in helping XU win its first-ever A-10 Tournament Championship. Posey earned the A-10's "Sixth Man Award" twice and was named 1999 A-10 First Team and 1999 A-10 Defensive Player of the Year. He did all of that while not being a consistent starter in the Xavier lineup, almost always coming off the bench and Posey became well sought after from several sports agents such as Bill Duffy, Andy Miller, Craig McKenzie and Mark Bartelstein. With their permission Posey allowed his interviews to be held in front of the media of the Cincinnati Enquirer.

== Professional career ==
=== Denver Nuggets (1999–2002) ===
Posey was selected out of Xavier University by the Denver Nuggets with the 18th pick of the 1999 NBA draft. His rookie season, Posey averaged 8.2 points and 3.9 rebounds per game en route to being named to the all-rookie second team.

On December 22, 2001, Posey scored a then career-high 33 points during a 105–101 loss to the Golden State Warriors.

In total, Posey played a little over three seasons with the team.

=== Houston Rockets (2002–2003) ===
Posey was sent to the Houston Rockets in a three-team deal also involving the Philadelphia 76ers on December 18, 2002.

=== Memphis Grizzlies (2003–2005) ===
After finishing the season with the Rockets, Posey signed with the Memphis Grizzlies as a free agent in the 2003 off-season.

On March 29, 2004, Posey scored a career-high 38 points, including making a three-point shot to force a second overtime, during a 136–133 win against the Atlanta Hawks.

=== Miami Heat (2005–2007) ===
On August 2, 2005, Posey was involved in the largest trade in NBA history, which involved 13 players and five different teams. Through this trade, the Miami Heat acquired point guard Jason Williams, forward Antoine Walker, shooting guard Andre Emmett, and the draft rights to Roberto Dueñas. The Memphis Grizzlies received shooting guard Eddie Jones, and point guard Raül López. Boston, who dealt Walker to the Heat, received a package that included Qyntel Woods, the draft rights to Albert Miralles, two second-round draft picks, and cash. The Boston Celtics also picked up Curtis Borchardt. Utah was able to acquire center Greg Ostertag, and the New Orleans Hornets acquired small forward Rasual Butler and shooting guard Kirk Snyder. Posey averaged 7.8 points and 4.8 rebounds per game in 2005–06.

After that somewhat disappointing regular season with Miami, Posey performed much better in the playoffs than expected. He had been a starter during the regular season, but head coach Pat Riley made the change of having Posey come off the bench for the playoffs. As the Heat's sixth man, Posey was able to average 11.8 points per game on 48.8% shooting against Miami's first-round opponent, the Chicago Bulls. Against Miami's second-round opponent, the New Jersey Nets, Posey was forced to prioritize defense, particularly guarding Vince Carter or Richard Jefferson. Although Posey's scoring dropped, his defense was said to have been the key to the Heat's advancement into the conference finals.

Posey again had to focus on defense against Miami's third-round opponent, the Detroit Pistons, particularly guarding Richard Hamilton, Tayshaun Prince, and even sometimes Chauncey Billups or Rasheed Wallace. Posey's defense was able to take the pressure off of Miami's scorers like Dwyane Wade, Jason Williams and Antoine Walker so that they could focus on their strengths on the offensive end.

In the 2006 NBA Finals against the Dallas Mavericks, Posey was a key factor on both ends of the court. Defensively, he, along with Udonis Haslem, provided tough defense on Mavericks All-Star Dirk Nowitzki. He also guarded Josh Howard, who had caused problems for Miami when Antoine Walker was guarding him. On the offensive end, Posey played a huge role in knocking down shots with Miami's All-Stars, Wade and Shaquille O'Neal, being double-teamed by Dallas often. In Game 4 of the Finals, Posey was impressive in Miami's blowout, scoring 15 points and grabbing 10 rebounds. In Game 6, Posey hit a huge shot to give Miami an 87–81 advantage with four minutes remaining; Miami would win the game 95–92 to clinch the championship. Posey averaged 7.3 points and 6 rebounds in the Finals.

On July 1, 2006, Posey exercised his $6.4 million contract option, opting not to become a free agent. He only played in 4 playoff games in the 2006–07 season, as the Heat were eliminated in the first round.

=== Boston Celtics (2007–2008) ===
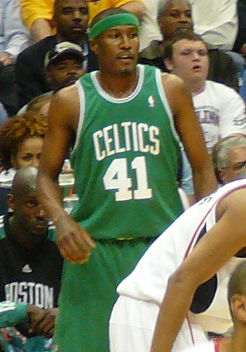
Posey in Game 4 of the 2008 NBA Playoffs against the Atlanta Hawks as a member of the Boston Celtics

On August 25, 2007, Posey signed with the Boston Celtics, adding to their revamped roster, including newcomers Kevin Garnett and Ray Allen. Terms of the deal were roughly $6.67 million over 2 years, with the second year being Posey's option. In the 2008 NBA Finals, Posey would win his second NBA championship, once again helping his team with tough defense and timely baskets at crunch time. On June 30, 2008, in a widely anticipated move, Posey opted out of the second and final year of his contract with the Celtics and became an unrestricted free agent, but had stated that he wanted to return to the Celtics on a new contract.

=== New Orleans Hornets (2008–2010) ===
On July 16, 2008, Posey signed with the New Orleans Hornets, accepting a four-year deal worth about $25 million.

=== Indiana Pacers (2010–2011) ===
On August 11, 2010, New Orleans sent Posey, along with Darren Collison, to the Pacers in a four-team, five-player trade with the New Jersey Nets and the Houston Rockets. On December 12, 2011, Posey was amnestied by the Pacers.

== Coaching career ==
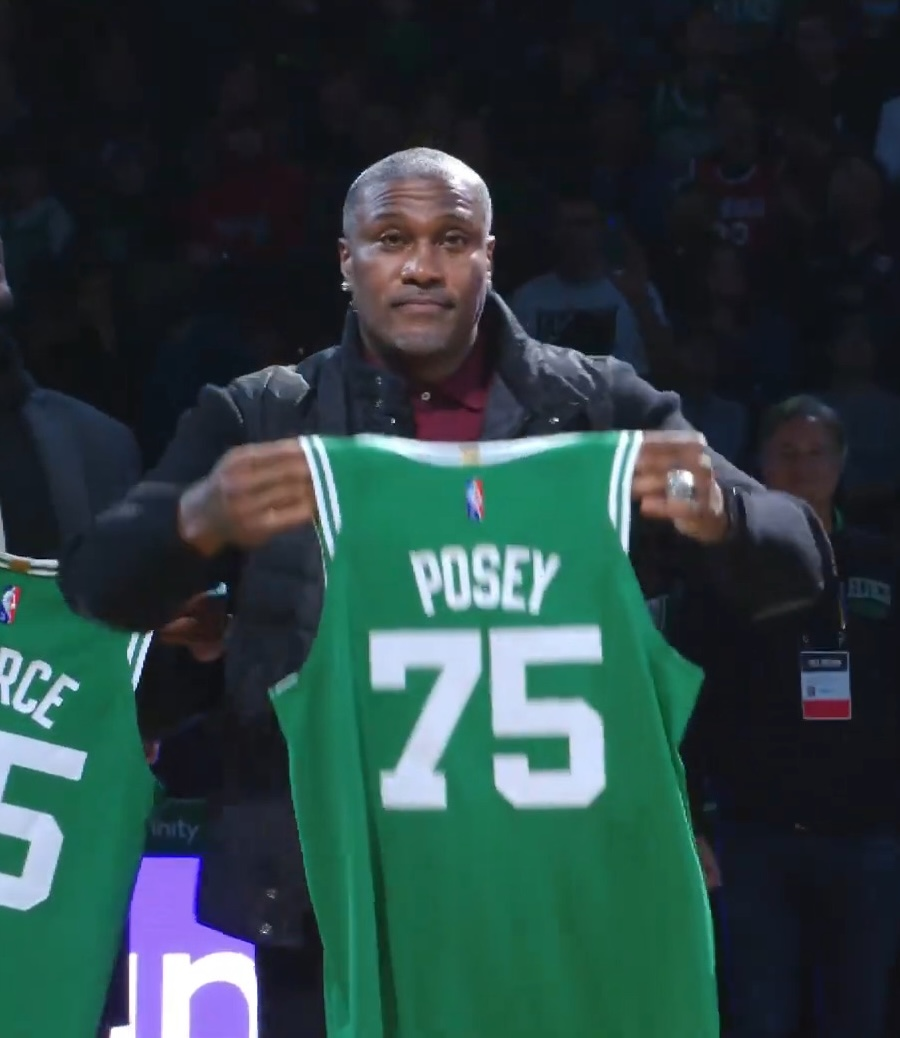
Posey in 2022

In September 2013, Posey was hired by the Canton Charge as an assistant coach for the 2013–14 season.

On August 19, 2014, Posey was hired by the Cleveland Cavaliers as an assistant coach for the 2014–15 season. In his second season with the Cavaliers, the team earned the 2016 NBA Finals Championship over the 73-win Golden State Warriors.

On July 26, 2022, Posey was hired by the Washington Wizards as an assistant coach.

On August 6, 2024, Posey was hired by the Phoenix Suns as an assistant coach under a mostly new coaching staff led by Mike Budenholzer.

On July 10, 2025, Posey was hired by the Portland Trail Blazers as an assistant coach. He reunites with Portland's head coach Chauncey Billups who Posey played with on the Denver Nuggets during the 1999-2000 season.

== Media career ==
James Posey currently has a weekly Podcast titled “The Posecast" on the Basketballnews.com Podcast Network where he's joined by his former teammates and people from around the NBA. He also writes weekly articles for the site focused on the NBA.

== Controversies ==
=== Incidents against Chicago Bulls ===
As a member of the Miami Heat, Posey had been involved in several controversial incidents with the Chicago Bulls. In Game 3 of the Chicago Bulls – Miami Heat first round match Kirk Hinrich was moving down the court when Posey hit Hinrich with a hard shoulder block knocking Hinrich down to the floor, was called for a Flagrant-2 Foul, and was ejected from the game. When asked about the shot to Hinrich, Posey responded, "I was just trying to get back on defense and cut the ball off." "He didn't see me and that's how collisions happen. That's all it was." When asked if he thought Posey was looking for trouble, Hinrich said, "I don't know. Maybe he was. I guess he just wanted to make a hard foul. Sometimes that's part of the game." The shot would also lead to Posey getting suspended for 1 game.

In the season opener of the 2006–07 NBA season, Posey was involved with another incident with Bulls rookie Tyrus Thomas, who was going for the rebound, was hit in the face by Posey which led to Thomas having his nose broken and missing a few games, and having to wear a protective mask for multiple games.

In this, his third incident with the Bulls at the United Center, Posey was ejected from the game with 7:16 remaining in the fourth quarter on December 27, 2006. Luol Deng, who attempted a layup, was fouled by Posey in mid-air. Deng fell hard on his wrist, which he had had surgery on just a year earlier, but it was not broken. Posey was called for a flagrant-2 foul and ejected. Posey was suspended for 1 game as a result of his infraction.

== Personal life ==
Posey has one son, Jace Posey, who is a guard/small forward at TCU. Jace previously played high school at Strake Jesuit High School.

In March 2008, Posey's girlfriend gave birth to daughter, Sai Aleke, in the Washington, D.C. area.

On April 9, 2007, Posey was arrested on a DUI charge and was taken to Dade County Jail. However, Posey continued playing with the Heat and coach Pat Riley stated he would support Posey.

Posey was suspended for the opener of the 2007–08 season by NBA commissioner David Stern after his no contest plea to reckless driving stemming from the DUI incident.

== Career statistics ==
Legend
GP	Games played	GS	Games started	MPG	Minutes per game
FG%	Field goal percentage	3P%	3-point field goal percentage	FT%	Free throw percentage
RPG	Rebounds per game	APG	Assists per game	SPG	Steals per game
BPG	Blocks per game	PPG	Points per game	**Bold**	Career high
†	Won an NBA championship	*	Led the league	‡	NBA record

=== NBA ===
==== Regular season ====
Year	Team	GP	GS	MPG	FG%	3P%	FT%	RPG	APG	SPG	BPG	PPG
1999–00	Denver	81	77	25.3	.429	.373	.800	3.9	1.8	1.2	.4	8.2
2000–01	Denver	82	**82***	27.5	.412	.300	.816	5.3	2.0	1.1	**.5**	8.1
2001–02	Denver	73	63	30.7	.376	.283	.793	**5.9**	2.5	1.6	**.5**	10.7
2002–03	Denver	**25***	24	**34.9**	.373	.273	.843	5.8	**3.1**	1.2	.2	**14.1**
2002–03	Houston	**58***	47	28.4	.439	.326	.826	4.8	1.8	1.3	.2	9.3
2003–04	Memphis	82	**82**	29.9	**.478**	.386	.830	4.9	1.5	**1.7**	**.5**	13.7
2004–05	Memphis	50	18	27.6	.357	.309	**.865**	4.4	1.8	1.0	**.5**	8.1
2005–06†	Miami	67	63	28.6	.403	**.403**	.787	4.8	1.3	.8	.3	7.2
2006–07	Miami	71	19	27.0	.431	.375	.827	5.0	1.3	1.0	.3	7.7
2007–08†	Boston	74	2	24.6	.418	.380	.809	4.4	1.5	1.0	.3	7.4
2008–09	New Orleans	75	0	28.5	.412	.369	.822	4.8	1.1	.8	.3	8.9
2009–10	New Orleans	77	2	22.5	.365	.335	.825	4.3	1.5	.5	.2	5.2
2010–11	Indiana	49	0	17.1	.336	.316	.733	3.0	.7	.5	.1	4.9
Career		864	479	26.9	.410	.349	.820	4.7	1.6	1.1	.3	8.6

==== Playoffs ====
Year	Team	GP	GS	MPG	FG%	3P%	FT%	RPG	APG	SPG	BPG	PPG
2004	Memphis	4	**4**	32.5	.405	.167	.905	5.5	1.0	**2.3**	.5	**12.5**
2005	Memphis	4	0	25.0	**.440**	**.467**	.769	3.3	1.0	.5	.3	9.8
2006†	Miami	22	1	27.5	.430	.422	.730	5.7	.9	.8	.1	7.3
2007	Miami	4	1	**34.8**	.385	.316	**1.000**	**7.8**	**1.5**	2.0	**1.3**	7.8
2008†	Boston	**26**‡	0	22.0	.437	.398	.875	3.6	1.1	1.0	.3	6.7
2009	New Orleans	5	0	24.6	.375	.263	.846	6.2	.6	.6	.0	11.4
Career		65	6	25.7	.421	.387	.831	4.8	1.0	1.0	.3	7.9

=== College ===
Year	Team	GP	GS	MPG	FG%	3P%	FT%	RPG	APG	SPG	BPG	PPG
1995–96	Xavier	Academically ineligible										
1996–97	Xavier	29	3	26.9	**.560**	.188	.781	7.8	1.4	1.7	.5	13.3
1997–98	Xavier	30	2	28.8	.556	.322	**.824**	8.4	1.3	2.1	.5	15.3
1998–99	Xavier	**36**	**36**	**35.2**	.488	**.366**	.814	**8.9**	**2.3**	**2.8**	**.9**	**16.9**
Career		95	41	30.7	.527	.329	.808	8.4	1.7	2.3	.7	15.3
