= 1997–98 Arizona Wildcats men's basketball team =

American college basketball season

1997–1998 Arizona Wildcats men's basketball

Pac-10 Regular-Season Champions

NCAA tournament, Elite Eight
- Conference: Pacific-10 Conference

Ranking
- Coaches: No. 6
- AP: No. 4
- Record: 30–5 (17–1 Pac-10)
- Head coach: Lute Olson (15th season)
- Assistant coaches: Jim Rosborough (9th season); Rodney Tention (1st season)
- Home arena: McKale Center

1997–98 Pacific-10 Conference men's basketball standings
	Conf.				Overall
Team	W		L	PCT	W		L	PCT
No. 4 Arizona	17	–	1	.944	30	–	5	.857
No. 10 Stanford	15	–	3	.833	30	–	5	.857
No. 19 UCLA	12	–	6	.667	24	–	9	.727
Washington	11	–	7	.611	20	–	10	.667
Arizona State	8	–	10	.444	18	–	14	.563
Oregon	8	–	10	.444	13	–	14	.481
California	8	–	10	.444	12	–	15	.444
USC	5	–	13	.278	9	–	19	.321
Oregon State	3	–	15	.167	13	–	17	.433
Washington State	3	–	15	.167	10	–	19	.345
As of November 23, 2011; Rankings from AP Poll

The 1997–98 Arizona Wildcats men's basketball team represented the University of Arizona in the 1997–98 NCAA Division I men's basketball season. The head coach was Lute Olson. The team played its home games in the McKale Center in Tucson, Arizona, and was a member of the Pacific-10 Conference. The Wildcats finished the season in first place in the Pacific-10 conference with a 17–1 record. Arizona reached the Elite Eight in the 1998 NCAA Division I men's basketball tournament, losing to Utah 76–51 and finishing the season with a 30–5 record.

== Roster ==
1997–98 Arizona Wildcats men's basketball team
Players
Coaches

Pos.	#	Name	Height	Weight	Year	Hometown
G	10	Mike Bibby	6 ft 2 in (1.88 m)	190 lb (86 kg)	So	Phoenix, Arizona
F	12	Josh Pastner	5 ft 11 in (1.8 m)	175 lb (79 kg)	So	Glen Dale, West Virginia
C	13	Donnell Harris	6 ft 11 in (2.11 m)	205 lb (93 kg)	Jr	Salinas, California
G	15	John Ash	5 ft 11 in (1.8 m)	170 lb (77 kg)	So	Tucson, Arizona
F	21	Bennett Davison	6 ft 8 in (2.03 m)	210 lb (95 kg)	Sr	Sebastopol, California
F	23	Michael Dickerson	6 ft 5 in (1.96 m)	190 lb (86 kg)	Sr	Seattle, Washington
G	24	Quynn Tebbs	6 ft 1 in (1.85 m)	180 lb (82 kg)	RS Fr	Salt Lake City, Utah
F	30	Justin Wessel	6 ft 8 in (2.03 m)	210 lb (95 kg)	RS Fr	Cedar Rapids, Iowa
G	31	Jason Terry	6 ft 2 in (1.88 m)	170 lb (77 kg)	Jr	Seattle, Washington
F	33	Eugene Edgerson	6 ft 6 in (1.98 m)	220 lb (100 kg)	So	New Orleans, Louisiana
G	34	Miles Simon	6 ft 5 in (1.96 m)	200 lb (91 kg)	Sr	Fullerton, California
C	42	AJ Bramlett	6 ft 11 in (2.11 m)	215 lb (98 kg)	Jr	Albuquerque, New Mexico
G	52	Jason Steward	5 ft 11 in (1.8 m)	165 lb (75 kg)	Jr	Gardena, California

Head coach

- Lute Olson (Augsburg)

Assistant coach(es)

- Jim Rosborough (associate head coach) (Iowa)
- Rodney Tention (San Francisco)
- Jay John (Arizona)

Legend

- (C) Team captain
- (S) Suspended
- (I) Ineligible
- (W) Walk-on
- Injured
- Current redshirt

Roster

== Schedule and results ==
Date time, TV	Rank^{#}	Opponent^{#}	Result	Record	Site (attendance) city, state
Regular season
Nov. 20, 1997*	No. 1	Morgan State	W 115-53	1–0	McKale Center; Tucson, Arizona
Nov. 24, 1997*	No. 1	vs. Boston College; Maui Invitational quarterfinal	W 99-69	2–0	Lahaina Civic Center; Honolulu, Hawaii
Nov. 25, 1997*	No. 1	vs. No. 8 Kentucky; Maui Invitational semifinal	W 89-74	3–0	Lahaina Civic Center; Honolulu, Hawaii
Nov. 26, 1997*	No. 1	vs. No. 3 Duke; Maui Invitational Championship	L 87-95	3-1	Lahaina Civic Center; Honolulu, Hawaii
Nov. 29, 1997*	No. 1	UNC Asheville	W 97-69	4-1	McKale Center; Tucson, Arizona
Dec. 2, 1997*	No. 4	vs. No. 2 Kansas; Great Eight Basketball Classic	L 87-90	4-2	United Center; Chicago, Illinois
Dec. 6, 1997*	No. 4	at Texas	W 88-81	5-2	Frank Erwin Center; Austin, Texas
Dec. 8, 1997*	No. 4	at Baylor	W 83-68	6-2	Ferrell Center; Waco, Texas
Dec. 13, 1997*	No. 6	Coppin State	W 99-82	7-2	McKale Center; Tucson, Arizona
Dec. 23, 1997*	No. 5	at No. 17 Florida State	L 79-84	7-3	Donald L. Tucker Civic Center; Tallahassee, Florida
Dec. 28, 1997*	No. 5	James Madison	W 92-68	8-3	McKale Center; Tucson, Arizona
Dec. 29, 1997*	No. 5	Kansas State	W 125-87	9-3	McKale Center; Tucson, Arizona
Jan. 3, 1998	No. 8	No. 9 UCLA; Rivalry	W 87-75	10-3 (1-0)	McKale Center; Tucson, Arizona
Jan. 5, 1998	No. 5	Southern California	W 91-72	11-3 (2-0)	McKale Center; Tucson, Arizona
Jan. 8, 1998	No. 5	at Washington State	W 94-81	12-3 (3-0)	Spokane Arena; Spokane, Washington
Jan. 10, 1998	No. 5	at Washington	W 110-91	13-3 (4-0)	Hec Edmundson Pavilion; Seattle, Washington
Jan. 15, 1998	No. 5	Arizona State; Rivalry	W 127-99	14-3 (5-0)	McKale Center; Tucson, Arizona
Jan. 18, 1998*	No. 5	No. 15 New Mexico	W 89-70	15-3	McKale Center; Tucson, Arizona
Jan. 22, 1998	No. 6	Oregon	W 87-57	16-3 (6-0)	McKale Center; Tucson, Arizona
Jan. 25, 1998	No. 6	Oregon State	W 93-80	17-3 (7-0)	McKale Center; Tucson, Arizona
Jan. 29, 1998*	No. 6	at No. 4 Stanford	W 93-75	18-3 (8-0)	Maples Pavilion; Stanford, California
Jan. 31, 1998	No. 6	at California	W 70-57	19-3 (9-0)	The Arena in Oakland; Oakland, California
Feb. 5, 1998	No. 4	Washington	W 112-81	20-3 (10-0)	McKale Center; Tucson, Arizona
Feb. 7, 1998	No. 4	Washington State	W 83-61	21-3 (11-0)	McKale Center; Tucson, Arizona
Feb. 14, 1998	No. 3	at Arizona State; Rivalry	W 83-82	22-3 (12-0)	Wells Fargo Center; Tempe, Arizona
Feb. 19, 1998	No. 3	at Oregon State	W 71-70	23-3 (13-0)	Gill Coliseum; Corvallis, Oregon
Feb. 21, 1998	No. 3	at Oregon	W 81-66	24-3 (14-0)	McArthur Court; Eugene, Oregon
Feb. 26, 1998	No. 2	California	W 76-73	25–3 (15-0)	McKale Center; Tucson, Arizona
Feb. 28, 1998	No. 2	Stanford	W 90-58	26-3 (16-0)	McKale Center; Tucson, Arizona
Mar. 5, 1998	No. 2	at Southern California	L 90-91 ^{OT}	26–4 (16-1)	Los Angeles Memorial Sports Arena; Los Angeles, California
Mar. 7, 1998	No. 2	at No. 19 UCLA; Rivalry	W 91-87	27-4 (17-1)	Pauley Pavilion; Los Angeles, California
NCAA tournament
Mar. 12, 1998*	(1 W) No. 4	vs. (16 W) Nicholls State; First Round	W 99-60	28–4	ARCO Arena; Sacramento, California
Mar. 14, 1998*	(1 W) No. 4	vs. (9 W) Illinois State; Second Round	W 66-59	29–4	ARCO Arena (16,402); Sacramento, California
Mar. 19, 1998*	(1 W) No. 4	vs. (4 W) No. 20 Maryland; Sweet Sixteen	W 87-79	30–4	Arrowhead Pond of Anaheim; Anaheim, California
Mar. 21, 1998*	(1 W) No. 4	vs. (3 W) No. 6 Utah; Elite Eight	L 51-76	30-5	Arrowhead Pond of Anaheim; Anaheim, California
*Non-conference game. ^{#}Rankings from AP Poll. (#) Tournament seedings in parentheses. All times are in Mountain Time.

=== NCAA Division I tournament ===
- West
  - Arizona (#1 seed) 99, Nicholls State 60
  - Arizona 82, Illinois State 49
  - Arizona 87, Maryland 79
  - Utah 76, Arizona 51

== 1998 NBA draft ==
Round	Pick	Player	NBA Team
1	2	Mike Bibby	Vancouver Grizzlies
1	14	Michael Dickerson	Houston Rockets
2	42	Miles Simon	Orlando Magic
